= 2008–09 Israel State Cup =

Tournament details
- Country: Israel

Final positions
- Champions: Beitar Jerusalem (7th title)
- Runners-up: Maccabi Haifa

The 2008–09 Israel State Cup (Hebrew: גביע המדינה, Gvia HaMedina) was the 70th season of Israel's nationwide football cup competition and the 55th after the Israeli Declaration of Independence.

The competition was won by Beitar Jerusalem who had beaten Maccabi Haifa 2–1 in the final.

As Beitar Jerusalem wasn't eligible for participating in UEFA competitions, and as runners-up Maccabi Haifa already qualified to 2009–10 UEFA Champions League, all Europa League spots were awarded to teams according to their league positions.

== Calendar ==
Round	Date
First round	September 5 to 8, 2008
Second round	September 12 to 15, 2008
Third round	October 3 and 4, 2008
Fourth round	October 20, 2008
Fifth round	October 27 to November 3, 2008
Sixth round	November 14 and 15, 2008
Seventh Round	December 23 to 27, 2008
Eighth Round	January 13, 20 and 27, 2009
Ninth Round	February 13 to 16, 2009
Round of 16	March 10 to 18, 2009
Quarter-finals	April 22, 2009
Semi-finals	May 13, 2009
Final	May 26, 2009

== Results ==
=== First round ===
Games were played from September 5 to 8, 2008.

Home team	Score	Away team	League
Beitar Nahariya	1–0	Hapoel Sakhnin	Bet North A
Hapoel Ironi Ar'ara	2–0	Hapoel Isfiya	Bet North A
Hapoel Iksal	0–2	Hapoel Kvalim Mesilot	Bet North A
Maccabi Beit She'an Nissim	7–0	Ihud Bnei Baqa	Bet North B
Beitar Haifa Ya'akov	6–1	F.C. Ahva Kafr Manda	Bet North B
Maccabi Sektzia Ma'alot-Tarshiha	2–2 (aet, p. 5–3)	Maccabi Ironi Kabul	Bet North B
Beitar Ramat Gan	4–2	Hapoel Hod HaSharon	Bet South A
Hapoel F.C. Ortodoxim Jaffa	4–1 (aet)	Maccabi Ironi Or Yehuda	Bet South A
Hapoel Pardesiya Noam	3–0	Shimshon Bnei Tayibe	Bet South A
Shikun Vatikim Ramat Gan	1–3	Maccabi HaSharon Netanya	Bet South A
F.C. Bnei Jaffa	1–2	Hapoel Azor	Bet South A
Otzma F.C. Holon	4–1	F.C. Kafr Qasim	Bet South A
Maccabi Ironi Amishav Petah Tikva	3–1	F.C. Ironi Or Yehuda	Bet South A
Hapoel Merhavim	3–4 (aet)	Bnei Eilat	Bet South B
F.C. Be'er Sheva	3–1	Maccabi Ironi Sderot	Bet South B
Maccabi Be'er Ya'akov	0–0 (aet, p. 3–4)	Hapoel Tirat Shalom	Bet South B
F.C. Dimona	4–0	Tzeirei Rahat	Bet South B
Tzafririm Holon	4–0	F.C. Shikun HaMizrah	Bet South B
F.C. Kiryat Gat	2–1	Hapoel Rahat	Gimel Central
Maccabi Rehovot	0–2	Bnei Yeechalal Rehovot	Gimel Central
Beitar Jaffa Zion	2–3	Hapoel Hura	Gimel Central
Hapoel Manshiya Zabda	3–11	Maccabi Ahi Iksal	Gimel Jezreel
Hapoel al-Ittihad Nazareth	4–1	Hapoel Ka'abiyye	Gimel Jezreel
Hapoel Spartak Haifa	1–4	Maccabi Neve Sha'anan Eldad	Gimel Shomron
F.C. Kiryat Yam	1–6	Maccabi Or Akiva	Gimel Shomron
Ironi Ariel	7–4	Hapoel Aliyah Kfar Saba	Gimel Sharon
Hapoel Bik'at HaYarden	4–2	Beitar Petah Tikva	Gimel Sharon
Hapoel Neve Golan	0–8	Hapoel Kiryat Ono	Gimel Tel Aviv
Hapoel Ramla	0–2	Elitzur Yehud Yotel	Gimel Tel Aviv
Maccabi Dynamo Holon	0–1	Elitzur Jaffa Tel Aviv	Gimel Tel Aviv
Bnei Yehud	3–2 (aet)	Hapoel Ironi Yehud	Gimel Tel Aviv
Ironi Beit Dagan	3–0	Hapoel Ironi Oranit	Gimel Tel Aviv
Brit Sport Ma'of	1–3	Agudat Sport Holon	Gimel Tel Aviv
Maccabi Kabilio Jaffa	6–0	Beitar Ezra	Gimel Tel Aviv
Gadna Tel Aviv Yehuda	1–2	Hapoel Kiryat Shalom	Gimel Tel Aviv
Maccabi Ironi Acre	0–1	Ihud Bnei Majd al-Krum	Gimel Upper Galilee
Hapoel Bnei Bi'ina	1–4	Hapoel Nahariya	Gimel Upper Galilee

=== Second round ===
Games were played from September 12 to 15, 2008.

Home team	Score	Away team	League
Hapoel Kavlim Mesilot	3–1	F.C. Tzeirei Bir al-Maksur	Bet North A
Hapoel Kaukab	0–1	Beitar Nahariya	Bet North A
Hapoel Ahva Haifa	0–2	Beitar Kafr Kanna	Bet North A
Maccabi Ironi Jatt	7–0	Hapoel Ironi Ar'ara	Bet North A
Maccabi Sektzia Ma'alot-Tarshiha	8–0	Hapoel Migdal HaEmek	Bet North B
Beitar Haifa Ya'akov	1–5	Maccabi Umm al-Fahm	Bet North B
Hapoel Daliyat al-Karmel	0–1	Maccabi Beit She'an Nissim	Bet North B
Hapoel Pardesiya Noam	2–0	Hapoel F.C. Ortodoxim Jaffa	Bet South A
Maccabi HaSharon Netanya	1–4	Hapoel Azor	Bet South A
Otzma F.C. Holon	0–2	Beitar Ramat Gan	Bet South A
Hapoel Mahane Yehuda	2–0	Maccabi Ironi Amishav Petah Tikva	Bet South A
Bnei Eilat	2–2 (aet, p. 1–3)	Beitar Ironi Ma'ale Adumim	Bet South B
Beitar Giv'at Ze'ev	2–0	Hapoel Tirat Shalom	Bet South B
F.C. Be'er Sheva	0–3	F.C. Dimona	Bet South B
Hapoel F.C. Ortodoxim Lod	3–0	Tzafririm Holon	Bet South B
F.C. Rishon LeZion	4–3	Hapoel Tel Sheva	Gimel Central
Hapoel Bnei Beit Safafa	0–2	F.C. Kiryat Gat	Gimel Central
Hapoel Hura	0–6	Bnei Yeechalal Rehovot	Gimel Central
Hapoel Matzliah	2–5	Maccabi Segev Shalom	Gimel Central
Beitar al-Amal Nazareth	2–11	F.C. Kfar Kama	Gimel Jezreel
Beitar Afula	0–3	Maccabi Ahi Iksal	Gimel Jezreel
Hapoel Bnei Nazareth	3–1	Hapoel al-Ittihad Nazareth	Gimel Jezreel
Maccabi Or Akiva	2–1	Hapoel Bnei Jisr az-Zarqa	Gimel Shomron
Ironi Ariel	0–4	Beitar Nes Tubruk	Gimel Sharon
Hapoel Bik'at HaYarden	7–2	Maccabi Bnei Jaljulia	Gimel Sharon
F.C. Bnei Ra'anana	4–0	F.C. Tel Mond	Gimel Sharon
F.C. Tira	3–0	F.C. Bnei Qalansawe	Gimel Sharon
Maccabi Kabilio Jaffa	2–1	Hapoel Kiryat Ono	Gimel Tel Aviv
Elitzur Yehud Yotel	2–5	Ironi Beit Dagan	Gimel Tel Aviv
Agudat Sport Holon	0–1	Bnei Yehud	Gimel Tel Aviv
Hapoel Kiryat Shalom	3–0	Elitzur Jaffa Tel Aviv	Gimel Tel Aviv
Maccabi Ein Mahil Jamel	3–1	F.C. Bnei Arraba	Gimel Upper Galilee
Hapoel Nahariya	3–2	Hapoel Bnei Maghar	Gimel Upper Galilee
Ihud Bnei Majd al-Krum	4–1	F.C. Otzma Bnei Yarka	Gimel Upper Galilee

=== Third round ===
Games were played on October 3 and 4, 2008.

Home team	Score	Away team	League
Maccabi Ironi Jatt	4–8 (aet)	Beitar Kafr Kanna	Bet North A
Beitar Nahariya	3–0	Hapoel Kavlim Mesilot	Bet North A
Maccabi Sektzia Ma'alot-Tarshiha	3–4	Maccabi Umm al-Fahm	Bet North B
Hapoel Halat al-Sharif Tamra	1–3	Maccabi Beit She'an Nissim	Bet North B
Hapoel Azor	3–0	Beitar Ramat Gan	Bet South A
Hapoel Mahane Yehuda	4–0	Hapoel Pardesiya Noam	Bet South A
Beitar Giv'at Ze'ev	3–1	Beitar Ironi Ma'ale Adumim	Bet South B
F.C. Dimona	4–2	Hapoel F.C. Ortodoxim Lod	Bet South B
F.C. Kiryat Gat	6–1	Hapoel Hura	Gimel Central
F.C. Kfar Kama	2–1 (aet)	Hapoel Bnei Musmus Ma'ale Iron	Gimel Jezreel
Hapoel Bnei Zemer	1–6	Maccabi Neve Sha'anan Eldad	Gimel Shomron
Hapoel Bnei Jisr az-Zarqa	2–0	Maccabi Or Akiva	Gimel Shomron
Hapoel Bik'at HaYarden	3–0	F.C. Tira	Gimel Shomron
Ironi Ariel	3–5	F.C. Bnei Ra'anana	Gimel Sharon
Bnei Yehud	3–1 (aet)	Hapoel Kiryat Shalom	Gimel Tel Aviv
Maccabi Kabilio Jaffa	4–0	Ironi Beit Dagan	Gimel Tel Aviv
Ihud Bnei Majd al-Krum	3–0	Maccabi Ein Mahil Jamel	Gimel Upper Galilee
Hapoel Nahariya	1–6	Bnei Kabul	Gimel Upper Galilee

=== Fourth round ===
Games were played on October 20, 2008.

Home team	Score	Away team	League
Beitar Kafr Kanna	2–3	Beitar Nahariya	Bet North A
Maccabi Beit She'an Nissim	2–3	Maccabi Umm al-Fahm	Bet North B
Hapoel Azor	2–1	Hapoel Mahane Yehuda	Bet South A
F.C. Dimona	1–2	Beitar Giv'at Ze'ev	Bet South B
Maccabi Segev Shalom	1–0	F.C. Kiryat Gat	Gimel Central
Maccabi Ahi Iksal	3–2	F.C. Kfar Kama	Gimel Jezreel
Maccabi Neve Sha'anan Eldad	3–5	Hapoel Bnei Jisr az-Zarqa	Gimel Shomron
Hapoel Bik'at HaYarden	3–2	F.C. Bnei Ra'anana	Gimel Sharon
Maccabi Kabilio Jaffa	2–1	Bnei Yehud	Gimel Tel Aviv
Ihud Bnei Majd al-Krum	3–2 (aet)	Bnei Kabul	Gimel Upper Galilee

=== Fifth round ===
Games were played on October 7, 8 and November 3, 2008.

Home team	Score	Away team	League
Hapoel Kafr Kanna	0–2	Maccabi HaShikma/Ramat Hen	Alef North
Beitar Safed	5–1	Maccabi Ironi Kafr Qara	Alef North
Hapoel Afula	2–1	Ironi Tiberias	Alef North
Maccabi Ironi Shlomi/Nahariya	2–1	Maccabi Tamra	Alef North
F.C. Ahva Arraba	3–1	Hapoel Asi Gilboa	Alef North
Ironi Sayid Umm al-Fahm	1–3	Hapoel Ironi Herzliya	Alef North
Maccabi Yavne	3–2	Hapoel Nahlat Yehuda	Alef South
Hapoel Hadera Eran	1–0	Ironi Ramla	Alef South
Maccabi Ironi Kiryat Malakhi	1–4	Hapoel Mevaseret Zion	Alef South
Maccabi Ironi Netivot	1–1 (aet, p. 4–1)	Hapoel Arad	Alef South
Maccabi Ironi Kfar Yona	2–4	Maccabi Kiryat Gat	Alef South
Hapoel Kfar Shalem	2–1	Beitar Kfar Saba Shlomi	Alef South

=== Sixth Round ===
Games were played on November 14 and 15, 2008.

Home team	Score	Away team
Maccabi Umm al-Fahm	3–0	Maccabi HaShikma/Ramat Hen
Maccabi Yavne	8–1	Maccabi Segev Shalom
Beitar Giv'at Ze'ev	0–3	Hapoel Mevaseret Zion
Maccabi Ironi Netivot	1–1 (aet, p. 5–4)	Hapoel Mahane Yehuda
Maccabi Kiryat Gat	3–0	Hapoel Masos/Segev Shalom
F.C. Dimona	3–2	Hapoel Hadera Eran
Maccabi Kabilio Jaffa	0–2	Hapoel Azor
Hapoel Kfar Shalem	0–1	Maccabi Be'er Sheva
Maccabi Beit She'an Nissim	5–3 (aet)	Maccabi Tzur Shalom
Hapoel Afula	2–0	Hapoel Bnei Jisr az-Zarqa
Maccabi Ironi Shlomi/Nahariya	0–1	Hapoel Ironi Herzliya
Beitar Ihud Mashhad	1–4	Beitar Kafr Kanna
Beitar Safed	1–0	Maccabi Ahi Iksal
Ihud Bnei Majd al-Krum	1–0	Beitar Nahariya

=== Seventh Round ===
Games were played from December 23 to 27, 2008.

Home team	Score	Away team
Hapoel Marmorek	4–1	Beitar Kafr Kanna
Hapoel Bnei Jadeidi	0–3	Hapoel Umm al-Fahm
F.C. Dimona	3–1	Maccabi Beit She'an Nissim
Hapoel Nazareth Illit	4–0	Maccabi Kiryat Gat
Hapoel Ironi Herzliya	0–0 (aet, p. 5–4)	Hapoel Azor
Sektzia Nes Tziona	2–0	Ihud Bnei Majd al-Krum
Maccabi Ironi Bat Yam	0–0 (aet, p. 1–4)	Beitar Shimshon Tel Aviv
Hapoel Rishon LeZion	3–0	Maccabi Umm al-Fahm
Maccabi Ironi Tirat HaCarmel	0–3	Hapoel Bnei Tamra
Hapoel Afula	4–1	Maccabi Kafr Kanna
F.C. Ahva Arraba	4–0	Hapoel Bik'at HaYarden
Hapoel Mevaseret Zion	1–0 (aet)	Maccabi Be'er Sheva

=== Eighth Round ===
Games were played on January 13, 20 and 27, 2009.

Home team	Score	Away team
Sektzia Nes Tziona	3–2 (aet)	Beitar Shimshon Tel Aviv
Hapoel Nazareth Illit	2–0	Beitar Safed
Hapoel Bnei Tamra	1–0	Hapoel Marmorek
Hapoel Mevaseret Zion	0–1 (aet)	Hapoel Umm al-Fahm
Hapoel Afula	1–0 (aet)	F.C. Ahva Arraba
Hapoel Ironi Herzliya	1–2	F.C. Dimona
Hapoel Ashkelon	2–1 (aet)	Maccabi Yavne
Maccabi Ironi Netivot	2–0	Hapoel Rishon LeZion

=== Ninth Round ===
Games were played from February 13 to 16, 2009.

Home team	Score	Away team
Hapoel Tel Aviv	2–0	Maccabi Tel Aviv
Ironi Kiryat Shmona	3–4	Beitar Jerusalem
Hapoel Ramat Gan	0–1 (aet)	Maccabi Haifa
Maccabi Netanya	1–0	Maccabi Petah Tikva
Hapoel Jerusalem	1–4 (aet)	F.C. Ashdod
Bnei Yehuda	0–0 (aet, p. 10–9)	Hapoel Umm al-Fahm
Hakoah Ramat Gan	3–1 (aet)	Hapoel Be'er Sheva
Hapoel Bnei Lod	0–1	Hapoel Petah Tikva
Hapoel Ra'anana	0–1	Bnei Sakhnin
Hapoel Kfar Saba	3–2 (aet)	Maccabi Herzliya
Maccabi Ahi Nazareth	2–1	Hapoel Haifa
Sektzia Nes Tziona	1–1 (aet, p. 6–5)	Hapoel Nazareth Illit
Ironi Nir Ramat HaSharon	0–1	Maccabi Ironi Kiryat Ata
Hapoel Afula	0–1	Hapoel Ashkelon
Maccabi Ironi Netivot	0–3	Hapoel Acre
Hapoel Bnei Tamra	2–1 (aet)	F.C. Dimona

=== Round of 16 to the Final ===
Games were played from March 10 to May 26, 2009.

Round of 16
March 17, 2009
Maccabi Ahi Nazareth	4 (aet)
Hapoel Ashkelon	2
March 12, 2009
Hapoel Tel Aviv	1 (1)
Maccabi Haifa	1 (2)
March 10, 2009
Maccabi Netanya	1
Hapoel Bnei Tamra	0
March 18, 2009
Bnei Yehuda	0
Bnei Sakhnin	2
March 17, 2009
F.C. Ashdod	1
Sektzia Nes Tziona	0
March 17, 2009
Maccabi Ironi Kiryat Ata	1
Hakoah Ramat Gan	2
March 17, 2009
Hapoel Petah Tikva	1
Hapoel Kfar Saba	2
March 11, 2009
Beitar Jerusalem	2
Hapoel Acre	0

Quarter-finals
April 22, 2009
Maccabi Ahi Nazareth	0
Maccabi Haifa	4
April 22, 2009
Maccabi Netanya	1 (aet)
Bnei Sakhnin	0
April 22, 2009
F.C. Ashdod	2 (2)
Hakoah Ramat Gan	2 (4)
April 22, 2009
Hapoel Kfar Saba	1
Beitar Jerusalem	2

Semi-finals
May 13, 2009
Maccabi Haifa	1 (5)
Maccabi Netanya	1 (4)
May 13, 2009
Hakoah Ramat Gan	1
Beitar Jerusalem	2

Final
May 26, 2009
Maccabi Haifa	1
Beitar Jerusalem	2

2008–09 Israel State Cup Winners
Beitar Jerusalem
