= 2019–20 Israel State Cup =

Tournament details
- Country: Israel

Final positions
- Champions: Hapoel Be'er Sheva
- Runners-up: Maccabi Petah Tikva

Tournament statistics
- Matches played: 158
- Goals scored: 564 (3.57 per match)

The 2019–20 Israel State Cup (Hebrew: גביע המדינה, Gvia HaMedina) was the 81st season of Israel's nationwide Association football cup competition and the 65th after the Israeli Declaration of Independence.

The competition started in August 2019.

== Preliminary rounds ==
=== First to fourth rounds ===
Rounds 1 to 4 double as cup competition for each division in Liga Bet and Liga Gimel. The two third-Round winners from each Liga Bet division and the fourth-Round winner from each Liga Gimel division advance to the sixth Round.

==== Liga Bet ====
Two teams from each regional divisions qualified to the sixth round .

=== District cup and qualified Liga Bet ===
Regional division	Winner	Runners-up
North A	Al-Nahda Nazareth	F.C. Bnei M.M.B.E.
North B	Ironi Nesher	Maccabi Bnei Reineh
South A	Beitar Kfar Saba	Beitar Ramat Gan
South B	Maccabi Ironi Sderot	Maccabi Kiryat Malakhi

the Winner along with the Runners-up qualified to the sixth round

==== Liga Bet North A ====
Home team	Score	Away team
First Round
Ahi Acre	Bye	-
Hapoel Tuba-Zangariyye	1–6	F.C. Bnei M.M.B.E.
Beitar Nahariya	1–0	Ihud Bnei Majd al-Krum
Maccabi Sektzia Ma'alot-Tarshiha	0–1	F.C. Bnei Bir al-Maksur
-	Bye	F.C. Ahva Kafr Manda
F.C. Tzeirei Kafr Kanna	0–1	Al-Nahda Nazareth
Maccabi Bnei Nahf	Bye	-
-	Bye	Tzeiri Sakhnin
Second Round
Ahi Acre	1–2 (a.e.t.)	Al-Nahda Nazareth
F.C. Bnei M.M.B.E.	Bye	-
-	Bye	Beitar Nahariya
Tzeiri Sakhnin	2–2 (a.e.t.) (3–2 p)	F.C. Bnei Bir al-Maksur
Third Round
Tzeiri Sakhnin	1–1 (a.e.t.) (4–5 p)	Al-Nahda Nazareth
F.C. Bnei M.M.B.E.	4–2	Beitar Nahariya
Fourth Round
Al-Nahda Nazareth	3–1	F.C. Bnei M.M.B.E.

Al-Nahda Nazareth won the district cup and qualified along with F.C. Bnei M.M.B.E. to the sixth round.

==== Liga Bet North B ====
Home team	Score	Away team
First Round
Maccabi Nujeidat Ahmad	1–1 (a.e.t.) (5–4 p)	Maccabi Ahi Iksal
Hapoel Tirat HaCarmel	1–0	Hapoel Ramot Menashe Megiddo
Hapoel Beit She'an Mesilot	3–4	Maccabi Bnei Reineh
Ihud Bnei Baqa	2–3	Hapoel Bnei Musmus
F.C. Pardes Hanna Lior Bokar	4–0	Hapoel Ihud Bnei Jatt
Hapoel Bnei Fureidis	1–2	Maccabi Umm al-Fahm
-	Bye	Ihud Bnei Kafr Qara
Ironi Nesher	1–1 (a.e.t.) (4–2 p)	Maccabi Neve Sha'anan Eldad
Second Round
Maccabi Nujeidat Ahmad	1–2	Maccabi Umm al-Fahm
Hapoel Tirat HaCarmel	0–1	F.C. Pardes Hanna Lior Bokar
Ihud Bnei Kafr Qara	2–4	Maccabi Bnei Reineh
Ironi Nesher	3–2	Hapoel Bnei Musmus
Third Round
Ironi Nesher	2–1	Maccabi Umm al-Fahm
F.C. Pardes Hanna Lior Bokar	0–2	Maccabi Bnei Reineh
Fourth Round
Ironi Nesher	4–2	Maccabi Bnei Reineh

Ironi Nesher won the district cup and qualified along with Maccabi Bnei Reineh to the sixth round.

==== Liga Bet South A ====
Home team	Score	Away team
First Round
Ironi Beit Dagan	Bye	-
F.C. Tzeirei Tayibe	6–0	Hapoel Hod HaSharon
Beitar Kfar Saba	2–2 (a.e.t.) (6–5 p)	Shimshon Bnei Tayibe
F.C. Bnei Jaffa Ortodoxim	3–2	Maccabi Amishav Petah Tikva
Hapoel Kafr Qasim Shouaa	1–6	Hapoel Qalansawe
Beitar Petah Tikva	1–2 (a.e.t.)	Shimshon Tel Aviv
Otzma Holon	2–0	Hapoel Mahane Yehuda
Beitar Ramat Gan	3–2	Hapoel Kiryat Ono
Second Round
Ironi Beit Dagan	1–1 (a.e.t.) (6–5 p)	Shimshon Tel Aviv
F.C. Tzeirei Tayibe	3–1	Hapoel Qalansawe
Otzma Holon	0–4	Beitar Kfar Saba
Beitar Ramat Gan	7–2	F.C. Bnei Jaffa Ortodoxim
Third Round
Beitar Ramat Gan	5–2	Ironi Beit Dagan
F.C. Tzeirei Tayibe	3–3 (a.e.t.) (3–4 p)	Beitar Kfar Saba
Fourth Round
Beitar Ramat Gan	1–1 (a.e.t.) (4–5 p)	Beitar Kfar Saba

Beitar Kfar Saba won the district cup and qualified along with Beitar Ramat Gan to the sixth round.

==== Liga Bet South B ====
Home team	Score	Away team
First Round
-	Bye	F.C. Shikun HaMizrah
Hapoel Lod	2–3 (a.e.t.)	Beitar Yavne
F.C. Dimona	8–0	Bnei Eilat
F.C. Tzeirei Rahat	1–4	F.C. Ironi Kuseife
Ironi Modi'in	Bye	-
Maccabi Ironi Netivot	2–1 (a.e.t.)	F.C. Be'er Sheva
Maccabi Kiryat Malakhi	w/o	Beitar Kiryat Gat
Hapoel Yeruham	1–2 (a.e.t.)	Maccabi Ironi Sderot
Second Round
F.C. Shikun HaMizrah	2–3	Maccabi Ironi Netivot
Beitar Yavne	1–1 (a.e.t.) (2–4 p)	Ironi Modi'in
Maccabi Kiryat Malakhi	1–0	F.C. Dimona
Maccabi Ironi Sderot	5–4	F.C. Ironi Kuseife
Third Round
Maccabi Ironi Sderot	4–1	Maccabi Ironi Netivot
Ironi Modi'in	1–5	Maccabi Kiryat Malakhi
Fourth Round
Maccabi Ironi Sderot	3–0	Maccabi Kiryat Malakhi

Maccabi Ironi Sderot won the district cup and qualified along with Maccabi Kiryat Malakhi to the sixth round.

==== Liga Gimel ====
One team from each regional divisions qualified to the sixth round .

=== District cup and qualified Liga Gimel ===
Regional division	Winner
Upper Galilee	Maccabi Ahva Sha'ab
Lower Galilee	Bnei Shefa-'Amr
Jezreel	Hapoel Ein as-Sahla
Samaria	Maccabi Ironi Tirat HaCarmel
Sharon	Tzeirei Tira
Tel Aviv	Shikun Vatikim Ramat Gan
Central	F.C. Ramla
South	F.C. Arad

the Winner qualified to the sixth round

==== Liga Gimel Upper Galilee ====
Home team	Score	Away team
First Round
Second Round
Third Round
Hapoel Karmiel	1–2	Hapoel Ironi Safed
Fourth Round
Maccabi Ahva Sha'ab	4–3	Hapoel Ironi Safed

Maccabi Ahva Sha'ab won the district cup and qualified to the sixth round.

==== Liga Gimel Lower Galilee ====
Home team	Score	Away team
First Round
Second Round
Bnei Shefa-'Amr	2–1	Maccabi Basmat Tab'un
Beitar Kafr Kanna	0–2	F.C. Tzeirei Tur'an
Maccabi Ironi Yafia	w/o	Hapoel Araba
Third Round
Maccabi Tabbash	w/o	Bnei Shefa-'Amr
F.C. Tzeirei Tur'an	1–6	Hapoel Araba
Fourth Round
Bnei Shefa-'Amr	3–0	Hapoel Araba

Bnei Shefa-'Amr won the district cup and qualified to the sixth round.

==== Liga Gimel Jezreel ====
Home team	Score	Away team
First Round
Second Round
Beitar Afula	0–3	Tzeirei Iksal
Hapoel al-Ittihad Nazareth	5–0	Hapeol Al-Batuf
Maccabi Ahva Fureidis	0–2	Hapoel Ein as-Sahla
Third Round
Hapoel Ein as-Sahla	4–1	Tzeirei Iksal
Fourth Round
Hapoel al-Ittihad Nazareth	0–1	Hapoel Ein as-Sahla

Hapoel Ein as-Sahla won the district cup and qualified to the sixth round.

==== Liga Gimel Shomron ====
Home team	Score	Away team
First Round
Hapoel Yokneam	w/o	Hapoel Bnei Jisr az-Zarqa
Second Round
Beitar Haifa	12–0	Beitar Kiryat Haim
Maccabi Barkai	0–3	Beitar Kiryat Ata Kfir
Maccabi Isfiya	1–1 (a.e.t.) (6–7 p)	Maccabi Ironi Tirat HaCarmel
Hapoel Yokneam	3–2	Maccabi Kiryat Yam
Third Round
Maccabi Ironi Tirat HaCarmel	3–0	Beitar Haifa
Hapoel Yokneam	2–1	Beitar Kiryat Ata Kfir
Fourth Round
Hapoel Yokneam	1–4	Maccabi Ironi Tirat HaCarmel

Maccabi Ironi Tirat HaCarmel won the district cup and qualified to the sixth round.

==== Liga Gimel Sharon ====
Home team	Score	Away team
First Round
F.C. Netanya Kolat Cohen	1–2	F.C. Bnei Ra'anana
Hapoel Pardesiya	3–0 (a.e.t.)	A.S. Sporting Tel Aviv
Tzeirei Tira	3–0	Beitar Nes Tubruk
Maccabi Kfar Yona	1–0	Bnei Tira
Second Round
Tzeirei Tira	5–0	Maccabi Kfar Yona
Hapoel Oranit	1–1 (a.e.t.) (3–4 p)	F.C. Ariel
Hapoel Pardesiya	4–2	Maccabi Giv'at Shmuel
Maccabi HaSharon Netanya	0–4	F.C. Bnei Ra'anana
Third Round
Hapoel Pardesiya	3–0	F.C. Bnei Ra'anana
Tzeirei Tira	4–0	F.C. Ariel
Fourth Round
Hapoel Pardesiya	1–2 (a.e.t.)	Tzeirei Tira

Tzeirei Tira won the district cup and qualified to the sixth round.

==== Liga Gimel Tel Aviv ====
Home team	Score	Away team
First Round
Maccabi Ironi Or Yehuda	0–9	Maccabi HaShikma Ramat Hen
F.C. Inter Aly'aa Tel Aviv	5–1	Hapoel Neve Golan
Elitzur Jaffa Tel Aviv	1–4 (a.e.t.)	Beitar Ezra
Bnei Yehud	3–2	Beitar Jaffa
Maccabi Spartak Ramat Gan	0–2	F.C. Roei Heshbon Tel Aviv
Hapoel Tzafririm Holon	2–0	Elitzur Yehud Yotel
Second Round
F.C. Roei Heshbon Tel Aviv	1–1 (a.e.t.) (5–3 p)	F.C. Inter Aly'aa Tel Aviv
Bnei Yehud	0–2	Hapoel Tzafririm Holon
Shikun Vatikim Ramat Gan	4–0	Beitar Ezra
Maccabi HaShikma Ramat Hen	3–2	Hapoel Ramat Yisrael
Third Round
F.C. Roei Heshbon Tel Aviv	1–3	Maccabi HaShikma Ramat Hen
Hapoel Tzafririm Holon	0–3	Shikun Vatikim Ramat Gan
Fourth Round
Shikun Vatikim Ramat Gan	3–2 (a.e.t.)	Maccabi HaShikma Ramat Hen

Shikun Vatikim Ramat Gan won the district cup and qualified to the sixth round.

==== Liga Gimel Center ====
Home team	Score	Away team
First Round
F.C. Ashdod City	Bye	-
Hapoel Ramla	3–0	Beitar Gedera
Beitar Ashdod	7–0	F.C. Tzeirei Lod
Hapoel Mevaseret Zion	0–6	F.C. Ramla
F.C. Rishon LeZion	0–3	Hapoel Tirat Shalom
Maccabi Kiryat Ekron	4–1	Beitar Gan Yavne
Hapoel Nachlat Yehuda	4–5	Hapoel Ashdod
Ironi Beit Shemesh	1–5	F.C. Jerusalem
Second Round
Hapoel Ramla	1–3	Hapoel Ashdod
F.C. Ashdod City	1–0	Beitar Ashdod
Maccabi Kiryat Ekron	1–5	F.C. Ramla
Hapoel Tirat Shalom	0–1	F.C. Jerusalem
Third Round
F.C. Ashdod City	1–3	Hapoel Ashdod
F.C. Jerusalem	0–3	F.C. Ramla
Fourth Round
F.C. Ramla	7–4	Hapoel Ashdod

F.C. Ramla Gan won the district cup and qualified to the sixth round.

==== Liga Gimel South ====
Home team	Score	Away team
First Round
Hapoel Sderot	5–3	Hapoel Mateh Yehuda
F.C. Arad	2–0	F.C. Be'er Sheva Haim Levy
Hapoel Merhavim	6–3	Maccabi Ironi Hura
Second Round
Beitar Giv'at Ze'ev	w/o	Hapoel Rahat
Hapoel Sderot	2–4	F.C. Ashkelon
F.C. Arad	1–0	Maccabi Dimona
Hapoel Merhavim	2–3	Maccabi Be'er Sheva
Third Round
F.C. Arad	2–0	Maccabi Be'er Sheva
Beitar Giv'at Ze'ev	0–2	F.C. Ashkelon
Fourth Round
F.C. Arad	4–1	F.C. Ashkelon

F.C. Arad won the district cup and qualified to the sixth round.

== Fifth round ==
The fifth Round is played within each division of Liga Alef. The winners qualify to the sixth Round

Home team	Score	Away team
Liga Alef North
Hapoel Bnei Ar'ara 'Ara	1–1 (a.e.t.) (2–4 p)	Hapoel Kafr Kanna
F.C. Tira	3–0	Hapoel Herzliya
Maccabi Tamra	0–2	Hapoel Bnei Zalafa
Ironi Tiberias	0–2	Hapoel Kaukab
Hapoel Iksal	2–1	F.C. Daburiyya
Maccabi Ironi Kiryat Ata	1–0	F.C. Haifa Robi Shapira
Hapoel Asi Gilboa	0–3	Maccabi Tzur Shalom
Hapoel Ironi Baqa al-Gharbiyye	1–2 (a.e.t.)	Hapoel Migdal HaEmek
Liga Alef South
Maccabi Kabilio Jaffa	1–0	Hapoel Azor
Shimshon Kafr Qasim	0–3	Ironi Or Yehuda
Ironi Ashdod	2–1 (a.e.t.)	Hapoel Kfar Shalem
Maccabi Kiryat Gat	w/o	F.C. Holon Yermiyahu
A.S. Nordia Jerusalem	4–2	Hakoah Amidar Ramat Gan
Maccabi Herzliya	0–2	Hapoel Marmorek
Maccabi Yavne	2–1 (a.e.t.)	Hapoel Bik'at HaYarden
Maccabi Sha'arayim	2–2 (a.e.t.) (5–6 p)	A.S. Ashdod

== Sixth Round ==
The Sixth Round is played in two District area (North and South) within the team are qualify from the previous Rounds. The winners qualify to the seven Round

Home team	Score	Away team
District North
Hapoel Iksal (3)	2–2 (a.e.t.) (3–4 p)	F.C. Bnei M.M.B.E. (4)
Hapoel Bnei Zalafa (3)	1–1 (a.e.t.) (5–6 p)	Maccabi Bnei Reineh (4)
F.C. al-Nahda Nazareth (4)	0–5	Maccabi Ironi Kiryat Ata (3)
Hapoel Kaukab (3)	2–0	Bnei Shefa-'Amr (5)
Hapoel Migdal HaEmek (3)	0–2	F.C. Tira (3)
Maccabi Ironi Tirat HaCarmel (5)	1–2	Ironi Nesher (4)
Hapoel Kafr Kanna (3)	1–2 (a.e.t.)	Maccabi Ahva Sha'ab (5)
Hapoel Ein as-Sahla (5)	0–1	Maccabi Tzur Shalom (3)
District South
Ironi Ashdod (3)	4–1 (a.e.t.)	F.C. Ramla (5)
Shikun Vatikim Ramat Gan (5)	1–6	A.S. Ashdod (3)
Maccabi Ironi Sderot (4)	1–0	Ironi Or Yehuda (3)
F.C. Arad (5)	0–1	Hapoel Marmorek (3)
F.C. Holon Yermiyahu (3)	4–5	Beitar Ramat Gan (4)
A.S. Nordia Jerusalem (3)	0–0 (a.e.t.) (4–5 p)	Maccabi Kiryat Malakhi (4)
Maccabi Yavne (3)	3–0	Maccabi Kabilio Jaffa (3)
Tzeirei Tira (5)	0–2	Beitar Kfar Saba (4)

== Seventh Round ==
Hapoel Katamon Jerusalem, Hapoel Bnei Lod, Hapoel Petah Tikva and Hapoel Afula were pre-qualified for the Next Round.

29 October 2019	Hapoel Kaukab (3)	2–3 (a.e.t.)	Maccabi Kiryat Malakhi (4)	Kaukab
13:00

29 October 2019	Hapoel Marmorek (3)	1–0	Maccabi Tzur Shalom (3)	Rehovot
13:00

29 October 2019	Maccabi Ahva Sha'ab (5)	1–2	Maccabi Ironi Sderot (4)	Sha'ab
13:00

29 October 2019	Maccabi Ironi Kiryat Ata (3)	0–1	Hapoel Nir Ramat HaSharon (2)	Kiryat Ata
13:00

29 October 2019	Maccabi Bnei Reineh (4)	2–1	Ironi Nesher (4)	Kafr Kanna

29 October 2019	F.C. Tira (3)	2–1	F.C. Bnei M.M.B.E. (4)	Tira
13:00

29 October 2019	Hapoel Umm al-Fahm (2)	6–0	Beitar Ramat Gan (5)	Afula
19:10

29 October 2019	A.S. Ashdod (3)	2–0	Hapoel Acre (2)	Ashdod
19:15

29 October 2019	Beitar Kfar Saba (4)	0–4	Hapoel Nof HaGalil (2)	Kfar Saba
19:20

29 October 2019	Maccabi Ahi Nazareth (2)	1–2 (a.e.t.)	F.C. Kafr Qasim (2)	Ilut
19:25

29 October 2019	Hapoel Ashkelon (2)	1–1 (a.e.t.) (4–3 p)	Maccabi Yavne (3)	Ashkelon
19:30

29 October 2019	Hapoel Rishon LeZion (2)	3–0	Beitar Tel Aviv Bat Yam (2)	Rishon LeZion
19:35

29 October 2019	Hapoel Ramat Gan Givatayim (2)	0–2	Maccabi Petah Tikva (2)	Ramla
19:40

31 October 2019	Maccabi Ironi Ashdod (3)	0–2	Bnei Sakhnin (2)	Ashdod
19:45

== Eighth Round ==
19 December 2019	Maccabi Bnei Reineh (4)	2–0	Maccabi Ironi Sderot (4)	Kafr Kanna
13:00				Stadium: Azmi Nassar Stadium

19 December 2019	F.C. Kafr Qasim (2)	1–0	Hapoel Kfar Saba (1)	Lod
19:30				Stadium: Lod Municipal Stadium

19 December 2019	Hapoel Afula (2)	2–1	Hapoel Ashkelon (2)	Afula
19:40				Stadium: Afula Illit Stadium

19 December 2019	Bnei Sakhnin (2)	3–2 (a.e.t.)	Nir Ramat HaSharon (2)	Sakhnin
19:50				Stadium: Doha Stadium

19 December 2019	Bnei Yehuda Tel Aviv (1)	2–0 (a.e.t.)	Hapoel Hadera (1)	Tel Aviv
20:00				Stadium: Bloomfield Stadium

19 December 2019	A.S. Ashdod (3)	1–0 (a.e.t.)	Hapoel Petah Tikva (2)	Ashdod
20:15				Stadium: Synthetic Pitch

20 December 2019	Maccabi Kiryat Malakhi (4)	1–4	Hapoel Ra'anana (1)	Kiryat Malakhi
13:00				Stadium: Kiryat Malakhi Stadium

20 December 2019	F.C. Tira (3)	0–4	Maccabi Netanya (1)	Tira
13:00				Stadium: Tira Ground

20 December 2019	Hapoel Nof HaGalil (2)	3–1	Hapoel Marmorek (3)	Ilut
15:00				Stadium: Ilut Stadium

20 December 2019	Maccabi Petah Tikva (2)	3–2 (a.e.t.)	Ironi Kiryat Shmona (1)	Petah Tikva
14:00				Stadium: HaMoshava Stadium

20 December 2019	Hapoel Bnei Lod (2)	1–5	Hapoel Haifa (1)	Lod
14:00				Stadium: Lod Municipal Stadium

21 December 2019	Maccabi Haifa (1)	3–1 (a.e.t.)	Sektzia Nes Tziona (1)	Haifa
15:00	Ashkenazi 45'; Menahem (yellow card) 59'; Haziza 112', 120'		Elad Shahaf (yellow card) 22'; Itay Ozeri (yellow card) 23'; Mizrahi (yellow card) 35'; Osher Abu 71'; Noam Cohen (yellow card) 77'; Ramaric Etou (yellow card) 10'	Stadium: Sammy Ofer Stadium; Attendance: 11,247; Referee: Sahlom Ben-Avraham

21 December 2019	F.C. Ashdod (1)	3–4	Hapoel Be'er Sheva (1)	Ashdod
17:30				Stadium: Yud-Alef Stadium

21 December 2019	Hapoel Umm al-Fahm (2)	3–2	Maccabi Tel Aviv (1)	Afula
19:30				Stadium: Afula Illit Stadium

22 December 2019	Hapoel Tel Aviv (1)	2–0 (a.e.t.)	Hapoel Katamon Jerusalem (2)	Tel Aviv
19:30				Stadium: Bloomfield Stadium

22 December 2019	Beitar Jerusalem (1)	5–0	Hapoel Rishon LeZion (2)	Jerusalem
20:15				Stadium: Teddy Stadium

== Round of 16 ==
14 January 2020	Hapoel Nof HaGalil (2)	0–1	Maccabi Petah Tikva (2)	Ilut
19:15			Brandão 89'	Stadium: Ilut Stadium

14 January 2020	Hapoel Umm al-Fahm (2)	0–1	Maccabi Haifa (1)	Afula
19:20	Mohammed Jabarin (yellow card) 44'; Nadav Muniss (yellow card) 56'	Report	Awaed (yellow card) 54'; Shua 57', (yellow card) 71'; Plakuschenko (yellow card) 87'	Stadium: Afula Illit Stadium; Attendance: 3,000; Referee: Ziv Adler

15 January 2020	Hapoel Haifa (1)	1–0	F.C. Kafr Qasim (2)	Haifa
19:15	Kanyuk 2'			Stadium: Sammy Ofer Stadium

15 January 2020	A.S. Ashdod (3)	2–4	Hapoel Ra'anana (1)	Ashdod
19:15	Lishay Biton 37' (pen.); Edelstein 86'		Yoav Tomer 19'; Ansah 24'; Yadin 55'; Or Dasa 65'	Stadium: Synthetic Pitch

15 January 2020	Bnei Yehuda Tel Aviv (1)	1–0	Hapoel Afula (2)	Tel Aviv
19:15	Ljujić 56'			Stadium: Bloomfield Stadium

15 January 2020	Bnei Sakhnin (2)	0–3	Hapoel Tel Aviv (1)	Sakhnin
20:15			Spirovski 40'; Barshazki 58'; Rodríguez 85' (pen.)	Stadium: Doha Stadium

16 January 2020	Beitar Jerusalem (1)	3–1	Maccabi Bnei Reineh (4)	Jerusalem
18:45	Tamir 11'; García 48'; Varenne 65'		Atamla 41'	Stadium: Teddy Stadium; Referee: Gal Levi

16 January 2020	Maccabi Netanya (1)	1–2	Hapoel Be'er Sheva (1)	Netanya
19:30	Olsak 29'		Zrihan 84'; Sahar 89' (pen.)	Stadium: Netanya Stadium; Referee: Roi Reinshreiber

== Quarter-final ==
3 March 2020	Hapoel Haifa (1)	0–2	Bnei Yehuda Tel Aviv (1)	Haifa
		Report	Ghadir 22'; Zaneti 90+2'	Stadium: Sammy Ofer Stadium; Referee: Liran Liany

4 March 2020	Hapoel Tel Aviv (1)	2–1 (a.e.t.)	Hapoel Ra'anana (1)	Tel Aviv
	Boateng 47'; Spirovski 110'	Report	Shemesh 80'	Stadium: Bloomfield Stadium; Referee: Yigal Frid

5 March 2020	Beitar Jerusalem (1)	1–1 (a.e.t.) (3–5 p)	Maccabi Petah Tikva (2)	Netanya
	Maman 70'	Report	Flesher 42'	Stadium: Netanya Stadium; Attendance: 2,800; Referee: Idan Leiba
	Penalties
	Vered (penalty scored); Maman (penalty scored); García (penalty scored); Konstantin (penalty missed)		Babayev (penalty scored); Levy (penalty scored); Twito (penalty scored); Abada (penalty scored); Cohen (penalty scored)

9 March 2020	Maccabi Haifa (1)	1–2	Hapoel Be'er Sheva (1)	Haifa
20:15	Arad 22'	Report	Vitor 35'; Sahar 62'	Stadium: Sammy Ofer Stadium; Attendance: 0 Referee: Ziv Adler

== Semi-final ==
9 June 2020	Maccabi Petah Tikva (2)	2–0	Hapoel Tel Aviv (1)	Netanya
20:30	Hadida 5' (pen.); Inbrum 50'			Stadium: Netanya Stadium
Note: originally scheduled for 12–14 May 2020 due to the COVID-19 pandemic in Israel The league was postponed indefinitely, the league resumed at 6 May 2020

10 June 2020	Hapoel Be'er Sheva (1)	1–1 (a.e.t.) (6–5 p)	Bnei Yehuda Tel Aviv (1)	Netanya
20:30	Josué 68'	Report	Ljujić 90+8' (pen.)	Stadium: Netanya Stadium; Referee: Igal Frid
Note: originally scheduled for 12–14 May 2020 due to the COVID-19 pandemic in Israel The league was postponed indefinitely, the league resumed at 6 May 2020

== Final ==
13 July 2020
20:45

Hapoel Be'er Sheva (1)	2–0	Maccabi Petah Tikva (2)
Sahar 49'; Josué 61'	Report

Bloomfield Stadium, Tel Aviv
Attendance: 0
Referee: Orel Grinfeld
