= 2005–06 Liga Gimel =

Israeli football season

The 2005–06 Liga Gimel season saw 84 clubs competing in 7 regional divisions for promotion to Liga Bet.

== Upper Galilee Division ==
Pos	Team	Pld	W	D	L	GF	GA	GD	Pts	Promotion
1	Maccabi Sha'ab	24	22	1	1	77	13	+64	67	Promoted to Liga Bet
2	Maccabi Bi'ina	24	22	1	1	104	27	+77	64 (Note: 3 points deducted.)	
3	Hapoel Nahariya	24	16	3	5	74	34	+40	51	
4	Bnei Kisra	24	15	2	7	47	38	+9	47	
5	F.C. Hurfeish	24	10	6	8	44	39	+5	36	
6	Alpha Ironi Safed	24	10	3	11	60	59	+1	33	
7	Hapoel Bnei Gush Halav	24	10	3	11	54	46	+8	33	
8	Hapoel Deir al-Asad	24	9	4	11	60	62	−2	31	
9	Beitar Abu Snan	24	5	7	12	45	68	−23	22	
10	Hapoel Rehaniya	24	6	3	15	43	81	−38	21	
11	Hapoel Jatt Yanuh HaGlilit	24	5	5	14	29	45	−16	20	
12	Beitar Bi'ina	24	3	2	19	26	85	−59	11	
13	Beitar Karmiel	24	2	2	20	13	79	−66	8	

Notes:
- Hapoel Ironi Hatzor withdrew midway during the season and its results were annulled.

== Western Galilee Division ==
Pos	Team	Pld	W	D	L	GF	GA	GD	Pts	Promotion
1	Maccabi Kabul	20	18	1	1	60	13	+47	55	Promoted to Liga Bet
2	Ahi Acre	20	16	1	3	53	16	+37	49	
3	Hapoel Kaukab	20	15	2	3	51	12	+39	47	
4	Maccabi Bnei Nahaf	20	10	4	6	35	27	+8	34	
5	Maccabi Bnei Reineh	20	9	5	6	35	23	+12	32	
6	Hapoel Shefa-'Amr	20	9	3	8	43	29	+14	30	
7	Maccabi Bu'eine Nujeidat	20	6	5	9	20	29	−9	23	
8	Beitar Ma'alot	20	4	3	13	27	73	−46	15	
9	Maccabi Arab al-Heib	20	2	4	14	23	59	−36	10	
10	Hapoel Daburiyya	20	2	3	15	17	48	−31	9	
11	Hapoel Sha'ab	20	2	3	15	27	62	−35	9	

- Beitar al-Amal Nazareth and Maccabi Maghar withdrew midway during the season and their results were annulled.

== Jezreel Division ==
Pos	Team	Pld	W	D	L	GF	GA	GD	Pts	Promotion
1	F.C. Tzeirei Bir al-Maksur	22	19	0	3	65	17	+48	57	Promoted to Liga Bet
2	Hapoel Kvalim Mesilot	22	17	3	2	78	22	+56	54	
3	Hapoel Ramot Menashe Megiddo	22	16	5	1	63	14	+49	53	
4	Maccabi Neve Sha'anan	22	15	3	4	54	22	+32	48	
5	Hapoel Bnei Nazareth	22	12	2	8	69	54	+15	38	
6	Hapoel Umm al-Ghanam/Nein	22	10	1	11	53	42	+11	31	
7	Beitar Afula	22	7	4	11	44	65	−21	25	
8	Hapoel al-Ittihad Nazareth	22	8	0	14	46	60	−14	24	
9	Hapoel Spartak Haifa	22	6	2	14	32	48	−16	20	
10	Maccabi Bnei Ilut	22	4	5	13	34	73	−39	17	
11	Beitar F.C. Tabash	22	3	2	17	18	67	−49	11	
12	Hapoel Ka'abiyye	22	1	1	20	18	90	−72	4	

== Samaria Division ==
Pos	Team	Pld	W	D	L	GF	GA	GD	Pts	Promotion
1	Ihud Bnei Baqa	27	24	2	1	94	22	+72	74	Promoted to Liga Bet
2	Maccabi Ironi Barta'a	27	23	2	2	82	13	+69	71	
3	Maccabi Ironi Jatt	27	12	7	8	57	53	+4	43	
4	Hapoel Muawiya	27	13	3	11	56	41	+15	42	
5	Hapoel Bnei Jisr az-Zarqa	27	10	4	13	37	41	−4	34	
6	Beitar Umm al-Fahm	27	9	2	16	36	64	−28	29	
7	Maccabi Fureidis	27	8	3	16	37	55	−18	27	
8	Maccabi Jisr az-Zarqa	27	7	4	16	36	58	−22	25	
9	Hapoel Bnei Zemer	27	7	3	17	38	82	−44	24	
10	Hapoel Bnei Musmus	27	6	2	19	23	67	−44	20	

== Sharon Division ==
Pos	Team	Pld	W	D	L	GF	GA	GD	Pts	Promotion
1	Beitar Pardes Hanna	22	18	3	1	71	20	+51	57	Promoted to Liga Bet
2	Hapoel Bik'at HaYarden	22	16	1	5	47	27	+20	49	
3	F.C. Bnei Ra'anana	22	12	6	4	59	27	+32	42	
4	Beitar Ironi Ariel	22	12	3	7	52	46	+6	39	
5	Maccabi HaSharon Netanya	22	11	4	7	60	27	+33	37	
6	Beitar Tubruk	22	10	5	7	41	28	+13	35	
7	Hapoel Pardesiya	22	10	3	9	60	47	+13	33	
8	Hapoel Aliyah Kfar Saba	22	8	3	11	45	45	0	27	
9	F.C. Tira	22	6	4	12	34	54	−20	22	
10	Hapoel Kafr Bara	22	5	2	15	33	54	−21	17	
11	Beitar Oranit	22	4	3	15	23	65	−42	15	
12	Beitar Hadera	22	1	1	20	17	104	−87	4	

== Tel Aviv Division ==
Pos	Team	Pld	W	D	L	GF	GA	GD	Pts	Promotion
1	Shikun Vatikim Ramat Gan	26	21	3	2	92	19	+73	66	Promoted to Liga Bet
2	F.C. Ironi Or Yehuda	26	21	2	3	120	23	+97	65	
3	Ortodoxim Jaffa	26	19	3	4	80	29	+51	60	
4	Hapoel Neve Golan	26	16	3	7	79	30	+49	51	
5	Hapoel Kiryat Shalom	26	15	3	8	63	31	+32	48	
6	Ironi Beit Dagan	26	13	4	9	61	67	−6	43	
7	Elitzur Yehud	26	12	1	13	64	60	+4	37	
8	Maccabi Ironi Or Yehuda	26	10	6	10	48	37	+11	36	
9	Brit Sport Ma'of	26	8	5	13	48	71	−23	29	
10	Elitzur Jaffa Tel Aviv	26	9	2	15	48	75	−27	29	
11	Beitar Ezra	26	8	1	17	40	82	−42	25	
12	Beitar Pardes Katz	26	4	4	18	35	68	−33	16	
13	Maccabi Dynamo Holon	26	3	3	20	27	85	−58	12	
14	Hapoel Ramla	26	2	2	22	34	162	−128	8	

== Central-South Division ==
Pos	Team	Pld	W	D	L	GF	GA	GD	Pts	Promotion
1	Beitar Ma'ale Adumim	22	20	1	1	85	18	+67	61	Promoted to Liga Bet
2	Maccabi Be'er Ya'akov	22	17	3	2	68	12	+56	54	Promoted to Liga Bet
3	F.C. Shikun HaMizrah	22	15	2	5	65	36	+29	47	
4	Hapoel Rahat	22	12	4	6	39	34	+5	40	
5	Maccabi Lod	22	8	8	6	35	26	+9	32	
6	Ironi Beit Shemesh	22	9	5	8	39	45	−6	32	
7	Beitar Ashkelon	22	8	3	11	43	50	−7	27	
8	Maccabi Rehovot	22	7	3	12	43	59	−16	24	
9	Ortodoxim Lod	22	5	1	16	25	53	−28	16	
10	Hapoel Hura	22	4	3	15	28	53	−25	15	
11	Maccabi Bnei Abu Ghosh	22	4	4	14	23	63	−40	15 (Note: 1 point deducted?)	
12	Hapoel F.C. Hevel Modi'in	22	4	1	17	33	77	−44	13	

Notes:
- Ironi Lod withdrew midway during the season and its results were annulled.
