= 2004–05 Liga Gimel =

Israeli football season

The 2004–05 Liga Gimel season saw 99 clubs competing in 8 regional divisions for promotion to Liga Bet.

== Upper Galilee Division ==
Promoted to Liga Bet:

- Maccabi Kafr Yasif (division champions)
- Hapoel Kisra
- Maccabi Kafr Sumei

Other league clubs:

- Alpha Ironi Safed
- Beitar Abu Snan
- Beitar Bi'ina
- Beitar Karmiel
- Bnei Kisra
- F.C. Hurfeish
- Hapoel Bnei Gush Halav
- Hapoel Deir al-Asad
- Hapoel Ironi Hatzor
- Hapoel Rehaniya
- Maccabi Beit Jann
- Maccabi Bi'ina

== Western Galilee Division ==
Promoted to Liga Bet:

- Beitar Ihud Mashhad (division champions)
- Hapoel Halat el-Sharif Tamra
- Ahva Arraba

Other league clubs:

- Ahi Acre
- Beitar el-Amal Nazareth
- Beitar al-Ittihad Shefa-'Amr
- Hapoel Daburiyya
- Hapoel Kaukab
- Hapoel Shefa-'Amr
- Maccabi Ironi Kabul
- Maccabi al-Heib
- Maccabi Sha'ab

== Jezreel Division ==
Promoted to Liga Bet:

- Hapoel Isfiya (division champions)

Other league clubs:

- Beitar Iksal
- Beitar F.C. Tabbash
- Beitar Afula
- F.C. Emek Yizra'el
- Hapoel al-Ittihad Nazareth
- Hapoel Bnei Kababir
- Hapoel Kfar Kama
- Hapoel Kvalim Mesilot
- Hapoel Ramot Menashe Megiddo
- Hapoel Spartak Haifa
- Maccabi Neve Sha'anan

== Samaria Division ==
Promoted to Liga Bet:

- Maccabi Umm al-Fahm (division champions)

Other league clubs:

- Al-Ahli Baqa
- Beitar Umm al-Fahm
- Bnei Baqa al-Gharbiyye
- F.C. Afek
- Hapoel Bnei Zemer
- Hapoel Basmat Tab'un
- Hapoel Kafr Sulam
- Hapoel Muawiya
- Hapoel Umm al-Ghanam Nein
- Maccabi Fureidis
- Maccabi HaSharon Netanya
- Maccabi Ironi Jatt

== Sharon Division ==
Promoted to Liga Bet:

- Maccabi Amishav Petah Tikva (division champions)
- Hapoel Ihud Bnei Jaffa

Other league clubs:

- Beitar Ironi Ariel
- Beitar Oranit
- Beitar Pardes Hanna
- Beitar Tubruk
- Hapoel Aliyah Kfar Saba
- Hapoel Beit Eliezer
- Hapoel Bik'at HaYarden
- Hapoel Kafr Bara
- Hapoel Pardesiya

== Tel Aviv Division ==
Promoted to Liga Bet:

- A.S. Holon (division champions)

Other league clubs:

- Beitar Ezra
- Beitar Pardes Katz
- Brit Sport Ma'of
- Elitzur Yehud
- Elitzur Jaffa Tel Aviv
- Hapoel F.C. Ortodoxim Jaffa
- Hapoel Kiryat Shalom
- Hapoel Neve Golan
- Maccabi Dynamo Holon
- Maccabi Ironi Or Yehuda
- Shikun Vatikim Ramat Gan

== Central Division ==
Promoted to Liga Bet:

- Hapoel Maxim Lod (division champions)

Other league clubs:

- Hapoel Azrikam
- Hapoel Be'er Ya'akov
- Hapoel F.C. Ortodoxim Lod
- Hapoel Monosson Yehud
- Hapoel Ramla
- F.C. Shikun HaMizrah
- Ironi Beit Dagan
- Ironi Lod
- Maccabi Rehovot

== South Division ==
Promoted to Liga Bet:

- Hapoel Masos Segev Shalom (division champions)
- Hapoel Tel Sheva
- F.C. Dimona

Other league clubs:

- Beitar Ironi Ma'ale Adumim
- F.C. Arad
- Hapoel Bnei Shimon
- Hapoel Hura
- Hapoel Rahat
- Hapoel Sde Uziyah/Be'er Tuvia
- Ironi Beit Shemesh
- Maccabi Bnei Abu Gosh
- Maccabi Lod
