= 2010–11 Liga Gimel =

Israeli football season

The 2010–11 Liga Gimel season saw 92 clubs competing in 6 regional divisions for promotion to Liga Bet.

F.C. Bu'eine (Upper Galilee), F.C. Daburiyya (Jezreel), Hapoel Baqa al-Gharbiyye (Samaria), F.C. Tira (Sharon), Gadna Tel Aviv (Tel Aviv) and Maccabi Be'er Ya'akov (Central) all won their respective divisions and were promoted to Liga Bet.

During the summer, as several vacancies were created in Liga Bet, runners-up F.C. Bnei Arraba (Upper Galilee), Maccabi Ein Mahil (Jezreel) and Hapoel Hod HaSharon (Sharon) were also promoted to Liga Bet.

== Upper Galilee Division ==
Pos	Team	Pld	W	D	L	GF	GA	GD	Pts	Promotion
1	F.C. Bu'eine	22	17	4	1	55	11	+44	55	Promoted to Liga Bet
2	F.C. Bnei Arraba	22	17	2	3	60	19	+41	53	Promoted to Liga Bet
3	Bnei Maghar	22	16	4	2	58	12	+46	52	
4	Hapoel Bu'eine	22	16	4	2	52	8	+44	52	
5	F.C. Tzeirei Tur'an	22	13	1	8	47	27	+20	40	
6	Hapoel Nahf	22	9	1	12	29	41	−12	28	
7	Maccabi Tzeirei Shefa-'Amr	22	6	4	12	33	34	−1	22	
8	Beitar Kafr Kanna	22	6	4	12	35	51	−16	22	
9	Maccabi Bnei Deir Hanna	22	5	2	15	33	75	−42	17	
10	Hapoel Bnei Bi'ina	22	5	2	15	31	76	−45	17	
11	Hapoel Bnei Rameh	22	4	4	14	28	48	−20	16	
12	Hapoel al-Ittihad Nazareth	22	2	0	20	17	76	−59	6	

During the season, Hapoel Halat al-Sharif Tamra, Maccabi Bnei Nahf (both after 1 match) and Maccabi Sha'ab (after 8 matches) folded and their results were annulled.

== Jezreel Division ==
Pos	Team	Pld	W	D	L	GF	GA	GD	Pts	Promotion
1	F.C. Daburiyya	30	27	2	1	90	12	+78	83	Promoted to Liga Bet
2	Maccabi Ein Mahil	30	27	3	0	92	14	+78	81 (Note: 3 points deducted.)	Promoted to Liga Bet
3	Maccabi Nazareth Illit	30	19	3	8	80	39	+41	60	
4	Maccabi Ironi Yafa	30	16	4	10	58	45	+13	52	
5	Hapoel Ka'abiyye	30	15	5	10	54	45	+9	50	
6	Hapoel Kafr Qara	30	13	9	8	43	33	+10	48	
7	Beitar Afula	30	14	4	12	59	46	+13	46	
8	Beitar el-Amal Nazareth	30	13	7	10	66	67	−1	46	
9	Hapoel Bnei Nazareth	30	13	5	12	64	54	+10	44	
10	Beitar Umm al-Fahm	30	10	5	15	38	51	−13	33 (Note: 2 points deducted.)	
11	Hapoel Bnei Zalafa	30	8	5	17	36	56	−20	29	
12	Hapoel Manshiya Zabda	30	7	6	17	51	70	−19	27	
13	Ahi Bir al-Maksur	30	7	6	17	42	75	−33	27	
14	Hapoel Bnei Nujeidat	30	8	6	16	48	60	−12	26 (Note: 4 points deducted?)	
15	Hapoel Bnei Shibli	30	2	6	22	26	98	−72	8 (Note: 4 points deducted.)	
16	Hapoel Bnei Hajajra	30	1	4	25	38	120	−82	4	

== Samaria Division ==
Pos	Team	Pld	W	D	L	GF	GA	GD	Pts	Promotion
1	Hapoel Baqa al-Gharbiyye	26	20	3	3	62	28	+34	63	Promoted to Liga Bet
2	F.C. Pardes Hanna-Karkur	26	18	4	4	72	22	+50	58	
3	Maccabi Fureidis	26	15	6	5	69	23	+46	51	
4	Hapoel Bnei Fureidis	26	14	7	5	50	32	+18	49	
5	F.C. Kiryat Yam	26	13	4	9	58	40	+18	43	
6	Maccabi Neve Sha'anan	26	11	8	7	47	35	+12	41	
7	Maccabi Barkai	26	12	4	10	55	57	−2	40	
8	Hapoel Yokneam	26	9	6	11	63	54	+9	33	
9	Hapoel Spartak Haifa	26	8	6	12	45	44	+1	30	
10	Beitar Pardes Hanna	26	8	6	12	51	52	−1	30	
11	Hapoel Bnei Zemer	26	7	5	14	42	64	−22	25 (Note: 1 point deducted.)	
12	Beitar Hadera	26	6	6	14	45	83	−38	24	
13	Hapoel Muawiya	26	3	4	19	42	82	−40	12	
14	Maccabi Jisr az-Zarqa	26	2	3	21	21	106	−85	9	

== Sharon Division ==
Pos	Team	Pld	W	D	L	GF	GA	GD	Pts	Promotion
1	F.C. Tira	24	20	3	1	85	17	+68	63	Promoted to Liga Bet
2	Hapoel Hod HaSharon	24	20	2	2	86	12	+74	62	Promoted to Liga Bet
3	F.C. Tzeirei Tayibe	24	19	2	3	59	24	+35	59	
4	Ironi Modi'in	24	17	1	6	89	31	+58	52	
5	F.C. Bnei Ra'anana	24	13	1	10	65	52	+13	40	
6	Hapoel Kafr Qasim Shouaa	24	12	4	8	43	34	+9	40	
7	F.C. Bnei Qalansawe	24	9	5	10	52	48	+4	32	
8	Hapoel Aliyah Kfar Saba	24	10	2	12	47	47	0	32	
9	Hapoel Jaljulia	24	7	3	14	33	58	−25	24	
10	Hapoel Kafr Bara	24	4	4	16	27	69	−42	16	
11	F.C. Kafr Qasim Nibrass	24	3	3	18	14	91	−77	11 (Note: 1 point deducted.)	
12	Beitar Tubruk	24	4	1	19	31	100	−69	8 (Note: 5 points deducted.)	
13	Shimshon Kafr Qasim	24	1	3	20	18	66	−48	6	

== Tel Aviv Division ==
Pos	Team	Pld	W	D	L	GF	GA	GD	Pts	Promotion
1	Gadna Tel Aviv	30	25	2	3	98	28	+70	77	Promoted to Liga Bet
2	Hapoel Ramat Israel	30	20	5	5	88	37	+51	65	
3	Hapoel Kiryat Shalom	30	19	4	7	57	36	+21	61	
4	F.C. Roei Heshbon Tel Aviv	30	18	5	7	74	45	+29	59	
5	Hapoel F.C. Givat Shmuel	30	18	5	7	88	30	+58	56 (Note: 3 points deducted.)	
6	Beitar Ironi Ariel	30	19	1	10	67	33	+34	56 (Note: 2 points deducted.)	
7	Hapoel Neve Golan	30	17	2	11	70	65	+5	52 (Note: 1 point deducted.)	
8	Hapoel Tel Sheva	30	12	10	8	70	55	+15	46	
9	F.C. Mahanaim Ramat Gan	30	9	7	14	60	64	−4	34	
10	Elitzur Jaffa Tel Aviv	30	10	3	17	65	84	−19	30	
11	Beitar Ezra	30	8	5	17	46	73	−27	29	
12	Beitar Oranit	30	7	4	19	40	76	−36	25	
13	Brit Sport Ma'of	30	6	4	20	51	109	−58	22	
14	F.C. Tzeirei al-Hoshla	30	6	3	21	52	96	−44	21	
15	International Tel Aviv	30	5	8	17	41	74	−33	20 (Note: 3 points deducted?)	
16	A.S. Holon	30	3	8	19	38	100	−62	17	

== Central Division ==
Pos	Team	Pld	W	D	L	GF	GA	GD	Pts	Promotion
1	Maccabi Be'er Ya'akov	28	25	1	2	133	18	+115	76	Promoted to Liga Bet
2	Ironi Beit Shemesh	28	23	2	3	114	28	+86	71	
3	Hapoel F.C. Hevel Modi'in	28	20	4	4	117	43	+74	64	
4	Bnei Yehud	28	17	3	8	85	58	+27	54	
5	Maccabi Yeruham	28	13	6	9	76	41	+35	45	
6	Hapoel Matzliah	28	13	6	9	70	58	+12	45	
7	Otzma F.C. Holon	28	13	4	11	67	57	+10	43	
8	Elitzur Yehud	28	12	2	14	80	72	+8	38	
9	Maccabi Rehovot	28	10	6	12	47	51	−4	36	
10	Hapoel Tirat Shalom	28	9	3	16	50	87	−37	30	
11	Ironi Beit Dagan	28	9	2	17	51	78	−27	29	
12	Beitar Jaffa	28	7	4	17	47	85	−38	25	
13	Maccabi Ironi Or Yehuda	28	5	7	16	41	79	−38	22	
14	F.C. Rishon LeZion	28	5	7	16	48	87	−39	18 (Note: 4 points deducted.)	
15	Hapoel Ramla	28	0	1	27	32	216	−184	1	

Notes:

During the season, Maccabi Segev Shalom (after 3 matches) folded and its results were annulled.
