= 2008–09 Liga Bet =

Israeli football season

The 2008–09 Liga Bet season was the last season of Liga Bet as the fifth tier of the Israeli football league system. The third tier, Liga Artzit was scrapped at the end of the season, making Liga Bet the fourth tier.

The season saw Maccabi Ironi Jatt (champions of the North A division), Maccabi Umm al-Fahm (champions of the North B division), Shimshon Bnei Tayibe (champions of the South A division) and Hapoel Tzafririm Holon (champions of the South B division) winning the title and promotion to Liga Alef.

The runners-up in each division entered a promotion/relegation play-offs, which saw a change of format, as this time, the North runners-up faced each other, as well as the South runners-up, with the winner of each match faced the clubs ranked 12th in Liga Alef North and South divisions respectively, for a decisive matches. Hapoel Daliyat al-Karmel lost to Maccabi Kafr Qara of Liga Alef North and Maccabi Amishav Petah Tikva lost to Hapoel Nahlat Yehuda of Liga Alef South. However, Maccabi Amishav Petah Tikva was eventually promoted to Liga Alef after a vacancy was created in the South division, since Hapoel Umm al-Fahm folded during the summer break.

At the bottom, Bnei Abu Snan, Beitar Kafr Kanna (from North A division), Hapoel Deir el-Asad, Maccabi Sha'ab (from North B division), Hapoel Hod HaSharon, Maccabi Or Yehuda (from South A division), Hapoel F.C. Hevel Modi'in and Hapoel Jaljulia (from South B division) were all automatically relegated to Liga Gimel

== North A Division ==
Pos	Team	Pld	W	D	L	GF	GA	GD	Pts	Promotion or relegation
1	Maccabi Ironi Jatt	30	23	4	3	74	27	+47	73	Promoted to Liga Alef
2	Hapoel Ahva Haifa	30	23	3	4	83	38	+45	72	Promotion play-offs
3	Hapoel Kafr Sumei	30	17	5	8	69	44	+25	56	
4	Hapoel Sakhnin	30	14	5	11	62	52	+10	47	
5	Hapoel Ramot Menashe Megiddo	30	13	8	9	54	40	+14	47	
6	F.C. Tzeirei Bir al-Maksur	30	13	4	13	47	50	−3	43	
7	Hapoel Kaukab	30	12	5	13	45	48	−3	41	
8	Hapoel Isfiya	30	11	5	14	61	71	−10	38	
9	Beitar Nahariya	30	10	8	12	53	47	+6	38	
10	Hapoel Ar'ara	30	10	5	15	54	68	−14	35	
11	Hapoel Iksal	30	15	4	11	54	46	+8	32 (Note: 17 points deducted.)	
12	Ahi Acre	30	9	5	16	50	71	−21	32	
13	Hapoel Karmiel	30	9	4	17	45	55	−10	31	
14	Hapoel Kvalim Mesilot	30	8	7	15	37	61	−24	31	
15	Bnei Abu Snan	30	8	5	17	37	64	−27	25 (Note: 4 points deducted.)	Relegated to Liga Gimel, folded
16	Beitar Kafr Kana	30	4	5	21	35	78	−43	17	Relegated to Liga Gimel

== North B Division ==
Pos	Team	Pld	W	D	L	GF	GA	GD	Pts	Promotion or relegation
1	Maccabi Umm al-Fahm	30	25	3	2	98	29	+69	78	Promoted to Liga Alef
2	Hapoel Daliyat al-Karmel	30	23	3	4	110	36	+74	72	Promotion play-offs
3	Beitar Haifa	30	19	4	7	97	43	+54	61	
4	Hapoel Migdal HaEmek	30	13	9	8	72	52	+20	48	
5	Hapoel Umm al-Ghanam/Nein	30	13	6	11	63	56	+7	45	
6	F.C. Ahva Kafr Manda	30	11	7	12	53	59	−6	40	
7	Maccabi Kabul	30	11	7	12	52	57	−5	40	
8	Hapoel Halat el-Sharif Tamra	30	12	3	15	51	65	−14	39	
9	Maccabi Beit She'an	30	11	5	14	74	71	+3	38	
10	Ihud Bnei Baka	30	10	7	13	57	70	−13	37	
11	Maccabi Barta'a	30	9	8	13	53	61	−8	35	
12	Maccabi Sektzia Ma'alot-Tarshiha	30	11	3	16	67	77	−10	34 (Note: Two points deducted.)	
13	Hapoel Nahariya	30	10	4	16	63	86	−23	34	
14	Maccabi Kafr Sumei	30	9	6	15	40	67	−27	33 (Note: As ranking in Liga Bet is not set by any other criteria other than points, a match was played between Maccabi Kafr Sumei and Hapoel Deir el-Asad to determine which club will be ranked 14th (and thus will be remained in Liga Bet) and which will be ranked 15th, and will be relegated to Liga Gimel. In the match, played on 16 May 2009 in a neutral venue, Beit She'an Municipal Stadium, Maccabi Kafr Sumei won 2–0 and was ranked 14th and remained in Liga Bet.)	
15	Hapoel Deir el-Asad	30	9	6	15	50	86	−36	33	Relegated to Liga Gimel
16	Maccabi Sha'ab	30	2	3	25	24	109	−85	8 (Note: One point deducted.)	Relegated to Liga Gimel

== South A Division ==
Pos	Team	Pld	W	D	L	GF	GA	GD	Pts	Promotion or relegation
1	Shimshon Bnei Tayibe	30	25	4	1	67	15	+52	79	Promoted to Liga Alef
2	Maccabi Amishav Petah Tikva	30	24	4	2	75	18	+57	76	Promotion play-offs
3	Hapoel Azor	30	18	5	7	72	30	+42	59	
4	Hapoel Mahane Yehuda	30	17	4	9	57	33	+24	55	
5	F.C. Ironi Or Yehuda	30	15	6	9	49	38	+11	51	
6	Otzma F.C. Holon	30	11	6	13	51	52	−1	39	
7	F.C. Bnei Jaffa	30	11	5	14	40	39	+1	38	
8	F.C. Kafr Qasim	30	10	7	13	40	42	−2	37	
9	Hapoel Pardesiya	30	9	9	12	39	44	−5	36	
10	Shikun Vatikim Ramat Gan	30	9	9	12	44	56	−12	36	
11	Ortodoxim Jaffa	30	9	8	13	35	40	−5	35	
12	Beitar Ramat Gan	30	8	10	12	41	42	−1	34	
13	Hapoel Ramat Israel	30	7	11	12	31	53	−22	32	
14	Maccabi HaSharon Netanya	30	8	7	15	32	53	−21	31	
15	Hapoel Hod HaSharon	30	8	5	17	34	63	−29	29	Relegated to Liga Gimel
16	Maccabi Or Yehuda	30	0	2	28	18	107	−89	2	Relegated to Liga Gimel

== South B Division ==
Pos	Team	Pld	W	D	L	GF	GA	GD	Pts	Promotion or relegation
1	Hapoel Tzafririm Holon	30	24	4	2	63	16	+47	76	Promoted to Liga Alef
2	Maccabi Sderot	30	22	6	2	64	21	+43	72	Promotion play-offs
3	Bnei Eilat	30	20	5	5	74	18	+56	65	
4	F.C. Dimona	30	15	6	9	53	36	+17	51	
5	Beitar Ma'ale Adumim	30	14	5	11	49	36	+13	47	
6	Maccabi Be'er Ya'akov	30	14	5	11	64	57	+7	47	
7	Beitar Giv'at Ze'ev	30	13	5	12	47	33	+14	44	
8	F.C. Be'er Sheva	30	11	5	14	43	48	−5	38	
9	F.C. Shikun HaMizrach	30	11	5	14	45	51	−6	38	
10	Hapoel Merhavim	30	10	8	12	48	56	−8	38	
11	Maccabi Sha'arayim	30	10	7	13	35	36	−1	37	
12	Ortodoxim Lod	30	10	3	17	44	70	−26	33	
13	Hapoel Tirat Shalom	30	9	5	16	35	56	−21	32	
14	Mo'adon Tzeirei Rahat	30	8	5	17	39	62	−23	29	
15	Hapoel F.C. Hevel Modi'in	30	5	3	22	33	86	−53	18	Relegated to Liga Gimel
16	Hapoel Jaljulia	30	5	1	24	28	82	−54	16	Relegated to Liga Gimel

== Promotion play-offs ==
=== North play-off ===
Liga Bet North A and North B runners-up, Hapoel Ahva Haifa and Hapoel Daliyat al-Karmel faced each other. The winner advanced to the decisive play-off match against the 12th placed club in Liga Alef North, Maccabi Kafr Qara.

15 May 2009

Hapoel Ahva Haifa	0–1	Hapoel Daliyat al-Karmel
	Report (in Hebrew)

Ilut Stadium

Hapoel Daliyat al-Karmel qualified for the decisive play-off match against Maccabi Kafr Qara.

20 May 2009

Maccabi Kafr Qara	1–0 (a.e.t.)	Hapoel Daliyat al-Karmel
	Report (in Hebrew)

Ilut Stadium

Maccabi Kafr Qara remained in Liga Alef.

=== South play-off ===
Liga Bet South A and South B runners-up, Maccabi Amishav Petah Tikva and Maccabi Sderot faced each other. The winner advanced to the decisive play-off match against the 12th placed club in Liga Alef North, Hapoel Nahlat Yehuda.

15 May 2009

Maccabi Sderot	0 – 0 (a.e.t.) 3-4 (pen.)	Maccabi Amishav Petah Tikva
	Report (in Hebrew)

Ness Ziona Stadium

Maccabi Amishav Petah Tikva qualified for the decisive play-off match against Hapoel Nahlat Yehuda.

20 May 2009

Maccabi Amishav Petah Tikva	0–2	Hapoel Nahlat Yehuda
	Report (in Hebrew)

Ness Ziona Stadium

Hapoel Nahlat Yehuda remained in Liga Alef; Maccabi Amishav Petah Tikva was promoted after Hapoel Umm al-Fahm (which relegated from Liga Artzit to Liga Alef) folded during the summer.
