= 2009–10 Liga Bet =

Israeli football season

The 2009–10 Liga Bet season was the first season since the 1998–99 Liga Bet season, in which Liga Bet regained its status as the fourth tier of Israeli football, due to the closure of Liga Artzit.

Ahi Acre (champions of the North A division), Hapoel Daliyat al-Karmel (champions of the North B division), Maccabi Kabilio Jaffa (champions of the South A division) and Bnei Eilat (champions of the South B division) won the title and promotion to Liga Alef.

The clubs ranked 2nd to 5th in each division entered a promotion play-off, at the end of which, in the North section Hapoel Ramot Menashe Megido won against Hapoel Bnei Jadeidi from Liga Alef North and was promoted to Liga Alef, while in the South section, Ironi Ramla lost to Shimshon Bnei Tayibe from Liga Alef South and failed to gain promotion.

At the bottom, Hapoel Halat el-Sharif Tamra (from North A division), Hapoel Bnei Musmus/Ma'ale Iron (from North B division), Hapoel Ramat Israel (from South A division) and Hapoel Tirat Shalom (from South B division) all finished bottom and were all automatically relegated to Liga Gimel.

The clubs ranked 12th to 15th in each division entered a relegation play-off, at the end of which Maccabi Kabul (from North A division), Beitar Ihud Mashhad (from North B division), Otzma F.C. Holon (from South A division) and Maccabi Be'er Ya'akov (from South B division) dropped to Liga Gimel as well.

== Changes from last season ==
=== Format changes ===
- Promotion play-offs were re-introduced. Clubs ranked 2nd to 5th entered the play-offs, playing each other (2nd against 5th and 3rd against 4th) in the first round, and the winners battling each other in the second round. In the third round the North A and North B winners played each other, as well as the South A and South B winners, each winner then playing the 14th ranked club in Liga Alef for a spot in next season's Liga Alef.
- Relegation play-offs were introduced. Clubs ranked 12th to 15th entered the play-offs, first playing each other (12th against 15th and 13th against 14th), and then both matches' losers facing each other, with the losing team in this match dropping to Liga Gimel.

=== Team changes ===
==== To/from Liga Alef ====
- Maccabi Ironi Jatt, Maccabi Umm al-Fahm, Shimshon Bnei Tayibe and Tzafririm Holon won their divisions the previous season were promoted to Liga Alef, along with best runner-up, Amishav Petah Tikva.
- Beitar Ihud Mashhad (to North B division) and Ironi Ramla (to South B division) were relegated from Liga Alef to Liga Bet.

==== Intra-divisional movements ====
- The North division were re-aligned again, moving Beitar Haifa, Maccabi Sektzia Ma'alot-Tarshiha, Maccabi Kafr Sumei, F.C. Ahva Kafr Manda, Hapoel Halat el-Sharif Tamra, Maccabi Kabul and Hapoel Nahariya from North B to North A, while Hapoel Iksal, Hapoel Isfiya, Hapoel Ar'ara and Hapoel Ramot Menashe Megido were moved from North A to North B.
- Hapoel Kvalim Mesilot changed its name to Hapoel Beit She'an/Mesilot, and was moved from North A division to North B division.

==== Merging and folding clubs ====
- Hapoel Karmiel merged with Beitar Safed from Liga Alef to form F.C. Karmiel Safed, which took Beitar Safed's place in Liga Alef.
- Bnei Abu Snan, which was relegated at the end of the previous season, folded.

==== To/from Liga Gimel ====
- Beitar Kafr Kana, Maccabi Sha'ab, Hapoel Deir el-Asad, Maccabi Or Yehuda, Hapoel Hod HaSharon, Hapoel F.C. Hevel Modi'in and Hapoel Jaljulia finished bottom and were relegated to Liga Gimel.
- Ihud Bnei Majd al-Krum and Maccabi Acre were promoted from Liga Gimel Upper Galilee to North A division.
- Maccabi Ahi Iksal, Hapoel Bnei Musmus/Ma'ale Iron (from Liga Gimel Jezreel), Maccabi Or Akiva and Bnei Jisr az-Zarqa (from Liga Gimel Shomron) were promoted to North B division
- Hapoel Bik'at HaYarden, Beitar Petah Tikva (from Liga Gimel Sharon), Hapoel Kiryat Ono and Maccabi Kabilio Jaffa (from Liga Gimel Tel Aviv) were promoted to South A division.
- Hapoel Rahat and F.C. Kiryat Gat were promoted from Liga Gimel Central to South B division.

== North A Division ==
Pos	Team	Pld	W	D	L	GF	GA	GD	Pts	Promotion or relegation
1	Ahi Acre	30	21	6	3	66	25	+41	69	Promoted to Liga Alef
2	Hapoel Kafr Sumei	30	19	8	3	69	28	+41	65	Promotion play-offs
3	Beitar Nahariya	30	20	4	6	72	31	+41	64	Promotion play-offs
4	Hapoel Sakhnin	30	16	4	10	49	38	+11	52	Promotion play-offs
5	Hapoel Ahva Haifa	30	14	8	8	58	36	+22	50	Promotion play-offs
6	Maccabi Sektzia Ma'alot-Tarshiha	30	14	5	11	41	35	+6	47	
7	Ihud Bnei Majd al-Krum	30	13	5	12	35	37	−2	44	
8	F.C. Ahva Kafr Manda	30	11	6	13	39	45	−6	39	
9	F.C. Tzeirei Bir al-Maksur	30	11	6	13	31	48	−17	39	
10	Maccabi Acre	30	10	8	12	44	46	−2	38	
11	Hapoel Kaukab	30	10	7	13	41	37	+4	37	
12	Hapoel Nahariya	30	8	9	13	36	47	−11	33	Relegation play-offs
13	Beitar Haifa	30	7	9	14	46	52	−6	30	Relegation play-offs
14	Maccabi Kabul	30	6	9	15	32	58	−26	27	Relegation play-offs
15	Maccabi Kafr Sumei	30	6	8	16	41	72	−31	26	Relegation play-offs
16	Hapoel Halat el-Sharif Tamra	30	1	4	25	22	87	−65	1 (Note: 6 points deducted)	Relegated to Liga Gimel

== North B Division ==
Pos	Team	Pld	W	D	L	GF	GA	GD	Pts	Promotion or relegation
1	Hapoel Daliyat al-Karmel	30	24	4	2	92	29	+63	76	Promoted to Liga Alef
2	Hapoel Iksal	30	18	6	6	63	32	+31	60	Promotion play-offs
3	Hapoel Ramot Menashe Megido	30	17	5	8	69	37	+32	56	Promotion play-offs
4	Maccabi Ahi Iksal	30	13	8	9	57	46	+11	47	Promotion play-offs
5	Hapoel Isfiya	30	12	7	11	46	44	+2	43	Promotion play-offs
6	Maccabi Or Akiva	30	12	6	12	48	50	−2	42	
7	Hapoel Ar'ara	30	12	4	14	52	77	−25	40	
8	Hapoel Umm al-Ghanam/Nein	30	12	4	14	58	55	+3	39 (Note: 1 point deducted?)	
9	Maccabi Beit She'an	30	11	5	14	61	69	−8	38	
10	Ihud Bnei Baqa	30	10	7	13	47	54	−7	37	
11	Bnei Jisr az-Zarqa	30	9	8	13	51	67	−16	35	
12	Hapoel Migdal HaEmek	30	9	8	13	33	45	−12	34 (Note: As ranking in Liga Bet is not set by any other criteria other than points, a match was played between Hapoel Migdal HaEmek and Hapoel Beit She'an/Mesilot to determine which club will be ranked 12th and which will be ranked 13th. In the match, played on 4 May 2010 in a neutral venue, Afula Illit Stadium, Hapoel Migdal HaEmek won 4–1 and was ranked 12th.)	Relegation play-offs
13	Hapoel Beit She'an/Mesilot	30	9	7	14	37	57	−20	34	Relegation play-offs
14	Maccabi Barta'a	30	7	10	13	42	49	−7	31	Relegation play-offs
15	Beitar Ihud Mashhad	30	9	6	15	37	51	−14	27 (Note: 6 points deducted)	Relegation play-offs
16	Hapoel Bnei Musmus/Ma'ale Iron	30	5	7	18	30	61	−31	22	Relegated to Liga Gimel

== South A Division ==
Pos	Team	Pld	W	D	L	GF	GA	GD	Pts	Promotion or relegation
1	Maccabi Jaffa	30	22	8	0	61	17	+44	74	Promoted to Liga Alef
2	Hapoel Azor	30	18	10	2	66	20	+46	64	Promotion play-offs
3	F.C. Kafr Qasim	30	18	6	6	68	20	+48	60	Promotion play-offs
4	Hapoel Kiryat Ono	30	16	7	7	54	32	+22	55	Promotion play-offs
5	Maccabi HaSharon Netanya	30	13	5	12	44	48	−4	44	Promotion play-offs
6	Ironi Or Yehuda	30	12	7	11	50	36	+14	43	
7	Beitar Ramat Gan	30	11	10	9	44	28	+16	43	
8	Hapoel Bik'at HaYarden	30	11	8	11	37	36	+1	41	
9	Hapoel Pardesiya	30	11	4	15	37	48	−11	37	
10	Shikun Vatikim Ramat Gan	30	9	10	11	37	50	−13	37	
11	F.C. Bnei Jaffa	30	10	6	14	39	42	−3	36 (Note: As ranking in Liga Bet is not set by any other criteria other than points, a match was played between F.C. Bnei Jaffa and Hapoel Mahane Yehuda to determine which club will be ranked 11th and which will be ranked 12th and will enter the relegation play-offs. In the match, played on 4 May 2010 in a neutral venue, Hapoel Tzafririm Holon ground, F.C. Bnei Jaffa won 2–1 and was ranked 11th.)	
12	Hapoel Mahane Yehuda	30	10	6	14	30	48	−18	36	Relegation play-offs
13	Beitar Petah Tikva	30	7	8	15	27	51	−24	29	Relegation play-offs
14	Ortodoxim Jaffa	30	6	7	17	24	49	−25	25	Relegation play-offs
15	Otzma F.C. Holon	30	5	8	17	21	44	−23	23	Relegation play-offs
16	Hapoel Ramat Israel	30	2	8	20	29	99	−70	14	Relegated to Liga Gimel

== South B Division ==
Pos	Team	Pld	W	D	L	GF	GA	GD	Pts	Promotion or relegation
1	Bnei Eilat	30	23	4	3	72	16	+56	73	Promoted to Liga Alef
2	Ironi Ramla	30	18	5	7	58	27	+31	59	Promotion play-offs
3	Mo'adon Tzeirei Rahat	30	14	12	4	55	32	+23	54	Promotion play-offs
4	F.C. Dimona	30	16	5	9	45	32	+13	53	Promotion play-offs
5	Ortodoxim Lod	30	15	7	8	56	46	+10	52	Promotion play-offs
6	F.C. Shikun HaMizrach	30	15	5	10	54	40	+14	50	
7	Beitar Ma'ale Adumim	30	14	8	8	46	20	+26	50	
8	F.C. Kiryat Gat	30	12	4	14	42	51	−9	40	
9	Hapoel Merhavim	30	11	5	14	55	57	−2	38	
10	F.C. Be'er Sheva	30	10	8	12	33	38	−5	38	
11	Maccabi Sha'arayim	30	10	6	14	28	45	−17	36	
12	Beitar Giv'at Ze'ev	30	8	10	12	42	46	−4	33 (Note: 1 point deducted?)	Relegation play-offs
13	Maccabi Sderot	30	9	6	15	37	50	−13	33	Relegation play-offs
14	Maccabi Be'er Ya'akov	30	7	4	19	42	67	−25	25	Relegation play-offs
15	Hapoel Rahat	30	5	4	21	33	66	−33	19	Relegation play-offs
16	Hapoel Tirat Shalom	30	5	3	22	27	92	−65	18	Relegated to Liga Gimel

== Promotion play-offs ==
=== North divisions ===
==== North A division ====
===== Semi-finals =====
4 May 2010	Hapoel Kafr Sumei	3–0	Hapoel Ahva Haifa	Kafr Sumei
16:00	Ali 18' (pen.); Ziada 21'; Badarne 58'	Report		Attendance: s Referee: Lugasi

4 May 2010	Beitar Nahariya	2–0	Hapoel Sakhnin	Nahariya
16:00	Namarni 52'; Rabinovich 87'	Report		Referee: Berger

Hapoel Kafr Sumei and Beitar Nahariya advanced to the North A division promotion play-offs final.

===== Final =====
7 May 2010	Hapoel Kafr Sumei	1–0	Beitar Nahariya	Kafr Sumei
16:00	Badarne 72' (pen.)	Report		Referee: Zatme

Hapoel Kafr Sumei advanced to the North regional final.

==== North B division ====
===== Semi-finals =====
4 May 2010	Hapoel Iksal	2–0 (a.e.t.)	Hapoel Isfiya	Iksal
16:00	Darawshe 114'; Abdallah 119'	Report		Referee: Z. Levi

4 May 2010	Hapoel Ramot Menashe Megido	1–1 (a.e.t.) (5–4 p)	Maccabi Ahi Iksal	Ramot Menashe
16:00	Bar-Nir 7'	Report	Zubidat 56'	Referee: Amar
	Penalties
	Hayat (penalty scored); Elbaz (penalty scored); Navon (penalty scored); Levi (penalty scored); Elkanati (penalty scored)		(penalty scored) Darawshe; (penalty scored) Kot; (penalty scored) Shalabi; (penalty scored) Ashta; (penalty missed) Assor

Hapoel Iksal and Hapoel Ramot Menashe Megido advanced to the North B division promotion play-offs final.

===== Final =====
7 May 2010	Hapoel Iksal	2–2 (a.e.t.) (1–4 p)	Hapoel Ramot Menashe Megido	Iksal
16:00	Hajj 90'; Habashi 110'	Report	Hayat 75'; Navon 97'	Referee: Rakotash

Hapoel Ramot Menashe Megido advanced to the North regional final.

==== North Regional final ====
7 May 2010	Hapoel Kafr Sumei	2–2 (a.e.t.) (3–5 p)	Hapoel Ramot Menashe Megido	Ilut Stadium
16:00	Badarne 7', 73'	Report	Hayat 31'; Elkanati 90'	Referee: Berger
	Penalties
	M. Falah (penalty scored); Trudi (penalty scored); Z.Falah (penalty missed); Ziada (penalty scored)		(penalty scored) Hayat; (penalty scored) Elkanati; (penalty scored) Navon; (penalty scored) Levi; (penalty scored) Bensal

Hapoel Ramot Menashe Megido advanced to the promotion play-off match against Hapoel Bnei Jadeidi from Liga Alef.

==== Promotion play-off match ====
31 May 2010	Hapoel Bnei Jadeidi	2–3	Hapoel Ramot Menashe Megido	Grundman Stadium
17:55	Shaaban 30'; Levi 45' (o.g.)	Report	Elkanati 75', 90'; Mizrahi 90'	Referee: Shmuelevich

Hapoel Ramot Menashe Megido promoted to Liga Alef; Hapoel Bnei Jadeidi relegated to Liga Bet.

=== South divisions ===
==== South A division ====
===== Semi-finals =====
4 May 2010	Hapoel Azor	1–0 (a.e.t.)	Maccabi HaSharon Netanya	New Holon Municipal Stadium
16:00	Zecharia 99'	Report		Referee: Liani

4 May 2010	F.C. Kafr Qasim	0–0 (a.e.t.) (8–9 p)	Hapoel Kiryat Ono	Kafr Qasim
16:00		Report		Referee: Papir

Hapoel Azor and Hapoel Kiryat Ono advanced to the South A division promotion play-offs final.

===== Final =====
7 May 2010	Hapoel Azor	2–0	Hapoel Kiryat Ono	New Holon Municipal Stadium
15:00	Ben Aderet 44', 64'	Report		Referee: Vaknin

Hapoel Azor advanced to the South regional final.

==== South B division ====
===== Semi-finals =====
4 May 2010	Ironi Ramla	3–0	Ortodoxim Lod	Ramla
16:00	Abushdid 41'; Ben Lulu 83'; Lari 90'	Report		Referee: Mor Haim

4 May 2010	Moadon Tzeirei Rahat	2–0	F.C. Dimona	Rahat
16:00	Siboni 73'; Elkashalla 90+3'	Report		Referee: Ben Avraham

Ironi Ramla and Moadon Tzeirei Rahat advanced to the South B division promotion play-offs final.

===== Final =====
7 May 2010	Ironi Ramla	5–4 (a.e.t.)	Moadon Tzeirei Rahat	Ramla
15:00	Aluk 30'; Liani 37' (pen.), 116', 117'; Arev 80'	Report	Huzayel 58'; Grandsch 61'; Arev 64' (o.g.); Slatikov 101'	Referee: Bar Natan

Ironi Ramla advanced to the South Regional final.

==== South Regional final ====
14 May 2010	Hapoel Azor	0–2	Ironi Ramla	Haberfeld Stadium
15:30		Report	Abushdid 83', 89'	Referee: Adler

Ironi Ramla advanced to the promotion play-off match against Shimshon Bnei Tayibe from Liga Alef.

==== Promotion play-off match ====
18 May 2010	Shimshon Bnei Tayibe	1–0	Ironi Ramla	Levita Stadium
15:30	Yasin 20'	Report		Referee: Hachmon

Shimshon Bnei Tayibe remained in Liga Alef; Ironi Ramla remained in Liga Bet.

== Relegation play-offs ==
=== North A division ===
==== Semi-finals ====
4 May 2010	Beitar Haifa	4–3	Maccabi Kabul	Avi Ran Stadium, Haifa
16:00	Biton 11', 27', 90'; Sabag 33'	Report	Hajj Khaled 44'; Hamam 82'; R. Taha 90+2'	Referee: Dotan

5 May 2010	Hapoel Nahariya	5–2	Maccabi Kafr Sumei	Nahariya
16:00	Elkaslasi 23'; Darwish 37'; Melamed 49', 56'; Acawi 85'	Report	Murad 12'; Amer 34'	Referee: Z. Levi

Beitar Haifa and Hapoel Nahariya remained in Liga Bet. Maccabi Kabul and Maccabi Kafr Sumei qualified for the North A division relegation play-off final.

==== Final ====
5 May 2010	Maccabi Kabul	0–0 (a.e.t.) (4–5 p)	Maccabi Kafr Sumei	Kabul
16:00		Report		Referee: Shitrit
	Penalties
	R. Taha (penalty scored); Hajj Khaled (penalty scored); Hibi (penalty scored); Elmakyes (penalty scored); M. Taha (penalty missed)		(penalty scored) Murad; (penalty scored) As'ad; (penalty scored) Kheir; (penalty scored) Bader; (penalty scored) Mdah

Maccabi Kafr Sumei remained in Liga Bet. Maccabi Kabul relegated to Liga Gimel.

=== North B division ===
==== Semi-finals ====
7 May 2010	Hapoel Migdal HaEmek	3–1	Beitar Ihud Mashhad	Migdal HaEmek
16:00	Zaid 7'; Ovadia 23'; Biton 30'	Report	M. Shehade 63'	Referee: Liani

7 May 2010	Hapoel Beit She'an/Mesilot	0–3 (a.e.t.)	Maccabi Barta'a	Mesilot
16:00		Report	A. Kabaha 95', 111'; M. Kabaha 99'	Referee: Wachsberger

Hapoel Migdal HaEmek and Maccabi Barta'a remained in Liga Bet. Beitar Ihud Mashhad and Hapoel Beit She'an/Mesilot qualified for the North B division relegation play-off final.

==== Final ====
5 May 2010	Hapoel Beit She'an/Mesilot	3–2	Beitar Ihud Mashhad	Beit She'an
16:00	Turjeman 45'; Stavi 75' (pen.); Luzon 85'	Report	O. Shehade 31'; Mansur 88'	Referee: Simnian

Hapoel Beit She'an/Mesilot remained in Liga Bet. Beitar Ihud Mashhad relegated to Liga Gimel.

=== South A division ===
==== Semi-finals ====
7 May 2010	Beitar Petah Tikva	1–1 (a.e.t.) (3–2 p)	Hapoel F.C. Ortodoxim Jaffa	Maccabi P. Tikva Synthetic ground
16:15	Soramello 70'	Report	Gharbua 54'	Referee: Wahabi
	Penalties
	Gabai (penalty missed); Kozoshvili (penalty scored); Katzar (penalty missed); Rosenfeld (penalty scored); Soramello (penalty scored)		(penalty scored) Abu Mashal; (penalty missed) Oz; (penalty scored) Biton; (penalty missed) Megera; (penalty missed) Duz

8 May 2010	Hapoel Mahane Yehuda	0–0 (a.e.t.) (5–4 p)	Otzma F.C. Holon	Zecharia Ratzabi Stadium
11:00		Report		Referee: Adler
	Penalties
	Sapir (penalty scored); Kalimi (penalty scored); Shoham Tzabari (penalty scored); Bachar (penalty scored); Shefet (penalty scored)		(penalty scored) Agiman; (penalty scored) Amran; (penalty missed) David; (penalty scored) Elkarif; (penalty scored) Genish

Beitar Petah Tikva and Hapoel Mahane Yehuda remained in Liga Bet. Hapoel F.C. Ortodoxim Jaffa and Otzma F.C. Holon qualified for the South A division relegation play-off final.

==== Final ====
14 May 2010	Hapoel F.C. Ortodoxim Jaffa	2–1	Otzma F.C. Holon	Tzeirei Jaffa ground, Tel Aviv
16:00	Eliyahu 47'; Ashkar 86'	Report	Nahum 6'	Referee: Buhbut

Hapoel F.C. Ortodoxim Jaffa remained in Liga Bet. Otzma F.C. Holon relegated to Liga Gimel.

=== South B division ===
==== Semi-finals ====
4 May 2010	Maccabi Sderot	0–0 (a.e.t.) (6–5 p)	Maccabi Be'er Ya'akov	Sderot
16:00		Report		Referee: Abu-Zeila
	Penalties
	Markovich (penalty scored); Mizrahi (penalty scored); Peretz (penalty scored); Zrihen (penalty scored); Ben Zikri (penalty missed); Bohadana (penalty missed); Rapaport (penalty scored); Tadesa (penalty scored)		(penalty missed) Gur; (penalty scored) Hajbi; (penalty scored) Zarmati; (penalty scored) Maman; (penalty scored) Gabai; (penalty missed) Vakhnin; (penalty scored) Dabush; (penalty missed) Hadad

4 May 2010	Beitar Giv'at Zeev	1–1 (a.e.t.) (2–3 p)	Hapoel Rahat	Giv'at Ze'ev
16:00	Avidani 25'	Report	Mozia 74'	Referee: Reinschreiber
	Penalties
	Vaknin (penalty scored); Dadia (penalty missed); Mizrahi (penalty scored); Shitrit (penalty missed); Amos (penalty missed)		(penalty scored) El-Kasasi; (penalty missed) Mozia; (penalty scored) K. El-Finish; (penalty missed) El-Atrash; (penalty scored) A. El-Finish

Maccabi Sderot and Hapoel Rahat remained in Liga Bet. Maccabi Be'er Ya'akov and Beitar Giv'at Zeev qualified for the South B division relegation play-off final.

==== Final ====
5 May 2010	Beitar Giv'at Zeev	2–0	Maccabi Be'er Ya'akov	Giv'at Ze'ev
16:00	Binyamin 40'; Mizrahi 90' (pen.)	Report		Referee: Mor Haim

Beitar Giv'at Zeev remained in Liga Bet. Maccabi Be'er Ya'akov relegated to Liga Gimel.
