= 2003–04 Liga Gimel =

Israeli football season

The 2003–04 Liga Gimel season saw 99 clubs competing in 8 regional divisions for promotion to Liga Bet.

== Upper Galilee Division ==
Promoted to Liga Bet:

- Hapoel Ironi I'billin (division champions)
- Maccabi Majd al-Krum

Other league clubs:

- Beitar Bi'ina
- Beitar Karmiel
- Bnei Kisra
- Hapoel Bnei Gush Halav
- Hapoel Deir al-Asad
- Hapoel Ironi Hatzor
- Maccabi Beit Jann
- Maccabi Bi'ina
- Maccabi Hurfeish
- Maccabi Maghar
- Maccabi Sha'ab

== Western Galilee Division ==
Promoted to Liga Bet:

- Beitar Julis (division champions)
- Beitar Kafr Kana

Other league clubs:

- Ahi Acre
- Beitar Abu Snan
- Beitar al-Ittihad Shefa-'Amr
- Beitar Ihud Mashhad
- Hapoel Halat el-Sharif Tamra
- Hapoel Kisra F.C.
- Hapoel Nahariya
- Hapoel Sha'ab
- Hapoel Shefa-'Amr
- Maccabi Bnei Yarka
- Maccabi Ironi Kabul
- Maccabi Kafr Sumei
- Maccabi Kafr Yasif

== Jezreel Division ==
Promoted to Liga Bet:

- Hapoel Kafr Misr Nein (division champions)

Other league clubs:

- Beitar Afula
- Beitar Iksal
- Beitar el-Amal Nazareth
- Beitar F.C. Tabbash
- Hapoel al-Ittihad Nazareth
- Hapoel Ka'abiyye
- Hapoel Kafr Sulam
- Hapoel Kfar Kama
- Hapoel Kvalim Mesilot
- Hapoel Ramot Menashe Megiddo
- Hapoel Wadi Salame
- Maccabi Beit She'an
- Maccabi Ein Mahil

== Samaria Division ==
Promoted to Liga Bet:

- Maccabi Or Akiva (division champions)

Other league clubs:

- Beitar Umm al-Fahm
- Beitar Pardes Hanna
- Hapoel Basmat Tab'un
- Hapoel Bnei Kababir
- Hapoel Bnei Musmus
- Hapoel Isfiya
- Hapoel Spartak Haifa
- Hapoel Umm al-Ghanam Nein
- Maccabi Neve Sha'anan
- Maccabi Fureidis
- Maccabi Ironi Barta'a
- Maccabi Ironi Jatt
- Maccabi Umm al-Fahm

== Sharon Division ==
Promoted to Liga Bet:

- Beitar Kfar Saba (division champions)
- Shimshon Bnei Tayibe

Other league clubs:

- Beitar Ironi Ariel
- Beitar Oranit
- Hapoel Aliyah Kfar Saba
- Hapoel Beit Eliezer
- Hapoel Bik'at HaYarden
- Hapoel Ihud Bnei Jaffa
- Hapoel Pardesiya
- Maccabi Amishav Petah Tikva
- Maccabi HaSharon Netanya

== Tel Aviv Division ==
Promoted to Liga Bet:

- Hapoel Ramat Israel (division champions)
- Beitar Kiryat Ono

Other league clubs:

- A.S. Holon
- Beitar Ezra
- Beitar Pardes Katz
- Brit Sport Ma'of
- Elitzur Yehud
- Elitzur Jaffa Tel Aviv
- Hapoel Kiryat Shalom
- Maccabi Dynamo Holon
- Maccabi Ironi Or Yehuda
- Shikun Vatikim Ramat Gan

== Central Division ==
Promoted to Liga Bet:

- Hapoel Tirat Shalom (division champions)

Other league clubs:

- Hapoel Azrikam
- Hapoel Be'er Ya'akov
- Hapoel F.C. Ortodoxim Jaffa
- Hapoel F.C. Ortodoxim Lod
- Hapoel Maxim Lod
- Hapoel Neve Golan
- Hapoel Ramla
- Ironi Beit Dagan
- Ironi Beit Shemesh
- Ironi Lod
- Maccabi Rehovot

== South Division ==
Promoted to Liga Bet:

- Maccabi Ironi Netivot (division champions)
- Moadon Tzeirei Rahat

Other league clubs:

- Beitar Ironi Ma'ale Adumim
- Hapoel Bnei Shimon
- Hapoel Hura
- Hapoel Rahat
- Hapoel Tel Sheva
- Maccabi Bnei Abu Gosh
