= 2008–09 Liga Alef =

Israeli football season

The 2008–09 Liga Alef season was the last season of Liga Alef as the fourth tier of the Israeli football league system. Third tier, Liga Artzit, was scrapped, while the Premier League and Liga Leumit were expanded to 16 clubs each, making Liga Alef the third tier, as well as expanding the two regional divisions to 16 clubs.

The season saw Ahva Arraba (champions of the North Division) and Maccabi Be'er Sheva (champions of the South Division) winning the title and promotion to Liga Leumit.

At the bottom, the bottom clubs in each division, Maccabi Ironi Shlomi/Nahariya, Beitar Ihud Mashhad (from North division), Ironi Ramla and Hapoel Masos/Segev Shalom (from South division) were all automatically relegated to Liga Bet, whilst the two clubs which were ranked in 12th place in each division, Maccabi Kafr Qara and Hapoel Nahlat Yehuda entered a promotion/relegation play-offs, and both remained in Liga Alef after winning the play-offs.

== Changes from last season ==
=== Format changes ===
At the end of the season no relegation play-offs were held. The two bottom clubs were relegated automatically, while the third from bottom club was safe from relegation.

=== Team changes ===
- Hapoel Umm al-Fahm and Maccabi Ironi Bat Yam were promoted to Liga Artzit; Maccabi HaShikma Ramat Hen (to North division) and Hapoel Kfar Shalem (to South division) were relegated from Liga Artzit.
- Beitar Haifa, Hapoel Ahva Haifa and Hapoel Makr were relegated to Liga Bet from North division; Ahva Arraba, Maccabi Kafr Qara and Maccabi Tamra were promoted to the North division from Liga Bet.
- Hapoel Tzafririm Holon, Maccabi Ironi Amishav Petah Tikva and Ironi Ofakim were relegated to Liga Bet from South division; Hapoel Hadera, Hapoel Masos/Segev Shalom and Hapoel Arad were promoted to the South division from Liga Bet.

== North Division ==
Pos	Team	Pld	W	D	L	GF	GA	GD	Pts	Promotion or relegation
1	Ahva Arraba	26	19	4	3	49	17	+32	61	Promoted to Liga Leumit
2	Hapoel Asi Gilboa	26	12	5	9	45	21	+24	41	
3	Hapoel Herzliya	26	11	6	9	35	25	+10	39	
4	Hapoel Kafr Kanna	26	9	10	7	26	26	0	37	
5	Ironi Tiberias	26	10	7	9	31	33	−2	37	
6	Maccabi HaShikma Ramat Hen	26	11	3	12	43	35	+8	36	
7	Beitar Safed	26	10	6	10	31	29	+2	36	
8	Maccabi Tamra	26	8	11	7	27	27	0	35	
9	Maccabi Tzur Shalom	26	9	8	9	31	32	−1	35	
10	Ironi Sayid Umm al-Fahm	26	10	5	11	32	34	−2	35	
11	Hapoel Afula	26	8	8	10	32	35	−3	32	
12	Maccabi Kafr Qara	26	8	8	10	27	33	−6	32	Relegation play-offs
13	Maccabi Ironi Shlomi/Nahariya	26	5	9	12	21	51	−30	24	Relegated to Liga Bet, folded
14	Beitar Ihud Mashhad	26	4	6	16	22	54	−32	18	Relegated to Liga Bet

== South Division ==
Pos	Team	Pld	W	D	L	GF	GA	GD	Pts	Promotion or relegation
1	Maccabi Be'er Sheva	26	17	4	5	40	15	+25	55	Promoted to Liga Leumit
2	Maccabi Ironi Netivot	26	15	8	3	50	20	+30	53	
3	Maccabi Yavne	26	15	6	5	46	26	+20	51	
4	Hapoel Hadera	26	15	2	9	43	25	+18	47	
5	Maccabi Kiryat Gat	26	12	6	8	34	29	+5	42	
6	Maccabi Kiryat Malakhi	26	10	9	7	30	29	+1	39	
7	Hapoel Mevaseret Zion	26	11	4	11	35	37	−2	37	
8	Hapoel Kfar Shalem	26	8	10	8	36	33	+3	34	
9	Maccabi Ironi Kfar Yona	26	10	4	12	31	36	−5	34	
10	Hapoel Arad	26	9	6	11	33	35	−2	33	
11	Beitar Kfar Saba	26	9	5	12	40	43	−3	32	
12	Hapoel Nahlat Yehuda	26	9	4	13	30	36	−6	31	Relegation play-offs
13	Ironi Ramla	26	4	1	21	21	55	−34	13	Relegated to Liga Bet
14	Hapoel Masos/Segev Shalom	26	2	3	21	18	68	−50	9	Relegated to Liga Bet, folded

== Relegation play-offs ==
=== North play-off ===
The 12th-placed team, Maccabi Kafr Qara, faced the Liga Bet promotion playoff winner Hapoel Daliyat al-Karmel.

20 May 2009

Maccabi Kafr Qara	1–0 (a.e.t.)	Hapoel Daliyat al-Karmel
	Report (in Hebrew)

Ilut Stadium

Maccabi Kafr Qara remained in Liga Alef.

=== South play-off ===
The 12th-placed team, Hapoel Nahlat Yehuda, faced the Liga Bet promotion playoff winner Maccabi Amishav Petah Tikva.

20 May 2009

Maccabi Amishav Petah Tikva	0–2	Hapoel Nahlat Yehuda
	Report (in Hebrew)

Ness Ziona Stadium

Hapoel Nahlat Yehuda remained in Liga Alef; Maccabi Amishav Petah Tikva was promoted after Hapoel Umm al-Fahm (which relegated from Liga Artzit to Liga Alef) folded during the summer.
