= 2009–10 Liga Alef =

Israeli football season

The 2009–10 Liga Alef season was the first season since the 1998–99 Liga Alef season, in which Liga Alef regained its status as the third tier of Israeli football, due to the closure of Liga Artzit.

Maccabi Ironi Jatt (champions of the North Division) and Hapoel Herzliya (champions of the South Division) won the title and promotion to Liga Leumit.

Promotion and relegation play-offs held. however, from the promotion play-offs, no club achieved promotion to Liga Leumit, as Liga Alef second placed play-off winner, Maccabi HaShikma Ramat Hen went down to Maccabi Be'er Sheva of Liga Leumit in the decisive match.

== Changes from last season ==
=== Format changes ===
- Following the scrapping of Liga Artzit, Liga Alef became the third tier of the Israeli football league system.
- Both divisions were expanded from 14 clubs to 16 clubs.
- The runners-up would participate in a promotion play-offs, first playing against each other, then the winner playing the 14th placed Liga Leumit club.
- The third-from-bottom clubs in each division would participate in a relegation play-offs, playing against the winner of the Liga Bet promotion play-offs.

=== Team changes ===
- Ahva Arraba and Maccabi Be'er Sheva F.C. were promoted to Liga Leumit; Maccabi Ironi Kiryat Ata (to North division) were relegated from Liga Leumit.
- Hapoel Bnei Jadeidi, Maccabi Kafr Kanna, Maccabi Tirat HaCarmel and Hapoel Bnei Tamra from Liga Artzit were placed in North division.
- Hapoel Herzliya and Maccabi HaShikma Ramat Hen were transferred from North division to South division.
- Beitar Safed merged with Liga Bet team Hapoel Karmiel to form F.C. Karmiel Safed. The merged team was placed in North division.
- Maccabi Ironi Shlomi/Nahariya and Beitar Ihud Mashhad were relegated to Liga Bet from North division; Maccabi Ironi Jatt and Maccabi Umm al-Fahm were promoted to the North division from Liga Bet.
- Ironi Ramla and Hapoel Masos/Segev Shalom were relegated to Liga Bet from South division; Shimshon Bnei Tayibe and Hapoel Tzafririm Holon were promoted to the South division from Liga Bet.
- As a further place was available in South division, Maccabi Amishav Petah Tikva, as the best runner-up in the Liga Bet, was also promoted.

== North Division ==
Pos	Team	Pld	W	D	L	GF	GA	GD	Pts	Promotion or relegation
1	Maccabi Ironi Jatt	30	22	5	3	64	21	+43	71	Promoted to Liga Leumit
2	Ironi Sayid Umm al-Fahm	30	23	6	1	64	16	+48	69 (Note: Six points deducted.)	Promotion play-offs
3	Hapoel Afula	30	17	3	10	59	32	+27	54	
4	Hapoel Asi Gilboa	30	14	4	12	42	37	+5	46	
5	Maccabi Ironi Kiryat Ata	30	13	6	11	43	39	+4	45	
6	Maccabi Kafr Qara	30	10	9	11	31	33	−2	39	
7	Ironi Tiberias	30	10	8	12	48	46	+2	38	
8	Maccabi Kafr Kanna	30	10	8	12	40	40	0	38	
9	F.C. Karmiel Safed	30	9	10	11	31	31	0	37	
10	Hapoel Kafr Kanna	30	11	4	15	33	41	−8	37	
11	Maccabi Tzur Shalom	30	10	6	14	33	48	−15	36	
12	Maccabi Tamra	30	9	8	13	40	45	−5	35	
13	Maccabi Umm al-Fahm	30	9	7	14	42	58	−16	34	
14	Hapoel Bnei Tamra (Note: After the end of season, the IFA demoted Hapoel Bnei Tamra to Liga Bet due to involvement in match-fixing. as a result, they were replaced in the relegation play-offs by Hapoel Bnei Jadeidi.)	30	8	10	12	30	45	−15	33 (Note: One point deducted.)	Relegated to Liga Bet
15	Hapoel Bnei Jadeidi	30	7	6	17	28	53	−25	25 (Note: Two points deducted.)	Relegation play-offs
16	Maccabi Tirat HaCarmel	30	5	6	19	27	70	−43	21	Relegated to Liga Bet

== South Division ==
Pos	Team	Pld	W	D	L	GF	GA	GD	Pts	Promotion or relegation
1	Hapoel Herzliya	30	20	7	3	63	20	+43	67	Promoted to Liga Leumit
2	Maccabi HaShikma Ramat Hen	30	16	9	5	44	25	+19	57	Promotion play-offs
3	Hapoel Hadera	30	16	5	9	40	32	+8	53	
4	Tzafririm Holon	30	12	9	9	35	28	+7	45	
5	Maccabi Ironi Netivot	30	12	6	12	39	32	+7	42	
6	Hapoel Kfar Shalem	30	9	14	7	34	34	0	41	
7	Hapoel Nahlat Yehuda	30	11	8	11	26	28	−2	41	
8	Maccabi Ironi Kfar Yona	30	11	7	12	32	36	−4	40	
9	Maccabi Kiryat Gat	30	12	4	14	37	42	−5	40	
10	Maccabi Yavne	30	9	11	10	29	24	+5	38	
11	Maccabi Kiryat Malakhi	30	8	11	11	27	31	−4	35	
12	Hapoel Arad	30	8	9	13	35	41	−6	33	
13	Maccabi Amishav Petah Tikva	30	7	10	13	26	35	−9	31	
14	Shimshon Bnei Tayibe	30	7	10	13	28	38	−10	31	Relegation play-offs
15	Beitar Kfar Saba	30	8	6	16	28	53	−25	30	Relegated to Liga Bet
16	Hapoel Mevaseret Zion	30	7	8	15	25	49	−24	29	Relegated to Liga Bet

== Promotion play-offs ==
The 2nd placed clubs in each division, Ironi Sayid Umm al-Fahm and Maccabi HaShikma Ramat Hen faced each other in Haberfeld Stadium, Rishon LeZion, and the winner advanced to the decisive play-off match against the 14th placed Liga Leumit club Maccabi Be'er Sheva.

28 May 2010
16:00 UTC+3

Maccabi HaShikma Ramat Hen	0 – 0 (a.e.t.) 4-2 (pen.)	Ironi Sayid Umm al-Fahm
	Report (in Hebrew)

Haberfeld Stadium, Rishon LeZion
Referee: Moshe Bohbot

Maccabi HaShikma Ramat Hen qualified for the decisive play-off match against Maccabi Be'er Sheva.

31 May 2010
15:30 UTC+3

Maccabi Be'er Sheva	2 – 0	Maccabi HaShikma Ramat Hen
Barda 74' 90+5'	Report (in Hebrew)

Haberfeld Stadium, Rishon LeZion
Attendance: 350
Referee: Shai Shitrit

Maccabi Be'er Sheva remained in Liga Leumit.

== Relegation play-offs ==
=== North play-off ===
Hapoel Bnei Jadeidi (which replaced the disqualified 14th placed club in Liga Alef North, Hapoel Bnei Tamra) faced the Liga Bet play-offs winner, Hapoel Ramot Menashe Megiddo. the winner earned a spot in the 2010–11 Liga Alef.

31 May 2010
17:55 UTC+3

Hapoel Bnei Jadeidi	2 – 3	Hapoel Ramot Menashe Megiddo
Sha'aban 30'; Levi 45' (o.g.)	Report (in Hebrew)	Elkanati 75' 90+'; Mizrahi 90'

Grundman Stadium, Ramat HaSharon
Referee: Eitan Shmuelevich

Hapoel Bnei Jadeidi relegated to Liga Bet.

=== South play-off ===
The 14th placed club in Liga Alef South, Shimshon Bnei Tayibe, faced the Liga Bet play-offs winner, Ironi Ramla. the winner earned a spot in the 2010–11 Liga Alef.

18 May 2010
15:30 UTC+3

Ironi Ramla	0 – 1	Shimshon Bnei Tayibe
	Report (in Hebrew)	Yassine 20'

Levita Stadium, Kfar Saba
Referee: Eli Hacmon

Shimshon Bnei Tayibe remained in Liga Alef.
