= Maccabi Segev Shalom F.C. =

Israeli football club

Maccabi Segev Shalom
- Full name: Maccabi Segev Shalom Football Club מכבי שגב שלום
- Founded: 2008; 2012 (re-establishment)
- Dissolved: 2011; 2016
- Manager: Rushdi Subeh
- League: Liga Bet South B
- 2014–15: 1st

Maccabi Segev Shalom (Hebrew: מכבי שגב שלום), also called Maccabi Shaqib al-Salam (Arabic: مكابي شقيب السلام), is an Israeli football club based in Shaqib al-Salam (Segev Shalom).

== History ==
The club was founded in 2008 and played in Liga Gimel South division for its first two seasons, winning the divisional cup in its first season and finishing as runners-up in its second season. Ahead of its third season, the South division was scrapped and the club was assigned to the Central division. The long distances to rival teams and the police refusal to allow the club to host matches In Shaqib al-Salam led to the collapse of the club and to its withdrawal from the league, after failing to appear to three matches.

Ahead of the 2012–13 the club was re-established and rejoined Liga Gimel. In 2015 the club won its division and was promoted to Liga Bet.

== Honours ==
=== League ===
Honour	No.	Years
Fifth tier	1	2014–15
