= Shmuel Kozokin =

Israeli footballer (born 1987)

Shmuel Kozokin שמואל קוזוקין
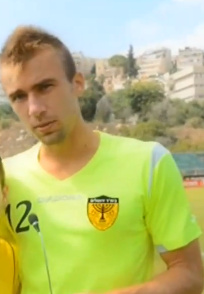
- Kozokin with Beitar Jerusalem in 2013

Personal information
- Date of birth: 16 November 1987 (age 38)
- Place of birth: Moscow, Russia, USSR
- Height: 1.85 m (6 ft 1 in)
- Position: Defender

Youth career
- 2000–2006: Beitar Jerusalem

Senior career*
Years	Team	Apps	(Gls)
2006–2013	Beitar Jerusalem	32	(1)
2013	→ Hapoel Kfar Saba (loan)	8	(0)
2013–2015	Ironi Beit Shemesh	31	(8)

International career^{‡}
2005–2006	Israel U19	16	(1)
2006–2008	Israel U21	3	(0)
2008–2010	Israel	3	(0)

Managerial career
- 2017–: Ironi Beit Shemesh
- * Club domestic league appearances and goals as of 22 October 2014 ‡ National team caps and goals as of 19 September 2009

Shmuel Kozokin
Medal record

Representing Israel

Football

Maccabiah Games
Gold medal – first place	2005 Maccabiah	Football

Shmuel Kozokin (Hebrew: שמואל קוזוקין; born 16 November 1987) is an Israeli former footballer. Kozokin was a defender. He won a gold medal with Team Israel at the 2005 Maccabiah Games. He played for the Israel national under-19 football team, the Israel national under-21 football team, the Israel national football team, Beitar Jerusalem, Hapoel Kfar Saba, and Ironi Beit Shemesh. Today he is a sport teacher in high school.

== Biography ==
He was born in Moscow, Russia, in the USSR in 1987. When he was four years old his family immigrated to Israel and lives in Beit Shemesh. At the age on nine he joined a football school, and at the age of 14 joined the youth team of Beitar Jerusalem.

He was part of the Israeli team at the 2005 Maccabiah Games that won the football gold medal.

He played for the Israel national under-19 football team in 2005–06. With the youth team he won the 2005–06 Israeli youth-teams-cup, and he was brought up to the mature team. He was part of the mature squad, and at the same time played for the youth team, with whom he won the 2006–07 cup and championship, and was chosen youth player of the year. He was also part of the Israel national under-21 football team that reached the UEFA European Under-21 Championship (though he did not play in the tournament itself).

In the 2006–07 season, when the mature team won the state championship, he was mostly a bench player, but at the same time played for the youth team that won the state cup and championship, and was chosen youth player of the year. In the 2007–08 season when the team won both the state championship and the state cup he played in many games, especially at the end of the season. After that season he received a call to the Israel national football team.

From 2006 to 2013 he played for Beitar Jerusalem. In January 2013, Kozokin transferred to Hapoel Kfar Saba. From 2013 to 2015 he played for Ironi Beit Shemesh.
