= F.C. Bnei Arraba =

Israeli football club

- Full name: Football Club Bnei Arraba מועדון כדורגל בני עראבה
- Founded: 2009
- Ground: Kaukab
- Chairman: Shadi Ghantous
- Manager: Abed Rabah
- League: Liga Gimel Lower Galilee
- 2015–16: 11th

F.C. Bnei Arraba (Hebrew: מועדון כדורגל בני עראבה) is an Israeli football club based in Arraba. The club currently plays in Liga Gimel Lower Galilee division.

== History ==
The club was established in 2009 and joined Liga Gimel, where it played until the end of the 2010–11 season, when the club finished second in the Upper Galilee division. The club lost a promotion play-off match against Maccabi Ein Mahil , but was promoted during the summer after Ironi Sayid Umm al-Fahm folded.

The club achieved its best position in Liga Bet in the 2012–13 season, placing fifth and reaching the promotion play-offs, in which the club defeated Ihud Bnei Majd al-Krum in the first round, but lost in the divisional final to Hapoel Kaukab. The following season, however, the club finished bottom of the league and dropped back to Liga Gimel.

== See also ==
- Sports in Israel
