= Beitar Ihud Mashhad F.C. =

Israeli football club

Beitar Ihud Mashhad
- Full name: Beitar Ihud Mashhad Football Club
- Founded: 2003
- Dissolved: 2010
- League: Liga Bet
- 2009–10: 15th (relegated)

Beitar Ihud Mashhad was an Israeli football club based in Mashhad.

== History ==
The club founded in 2003, following the collapse of both Hapoel and Maccabi clubs in Mashhad, who were playing in Liga Gimel before their collapse. The club entered the Western Galilee division of Liga Gimel for the 2003–04 season and won the division the following season. In 2007 the club won the North A division of Liga Bet and won promotion to Liga Alef.

The club finished 9th in its first season in Liga Alef, but sunk to the bottom during the following season and relegated back to Liga Bet. In Liga Bet, the club suffered another dismal season, including a deduction of 6 points, eventually finishing 15th. The club played in the relegation playoffs, losing to Hapoel Migdal HaEmek and Hapoel Beit She'an and relegated to Liga Gimel, following which the club folded.

== Honours ==
=== League ===
Honour	No.	Years
Fifth tier	1	2006–07
Sixth tier	1	2004–05
