= Hapoel Ramat Yisrael F.C. =

Israeli football club

Hapoel Ramat Yisrael
- Full name: Hapoel Ramat Yisrael Football Club הפועל רמת ישראל
- Founded: 1993
- Ground: Southern Sportech Ground, Tel Aviv
- Chairman: Yaniv Noah
- Manager: Ofer Michaelov
- League: Liga Gimel
- 2023–24: Liga Gimel Tel Aviv, 4th
Home colours	Away colours

Ramat Sha (Hebrew: הפועל רמת ישראל) is an Israeli football club based in the Ramat Yisrael neighbourhood of Tel Aviv. As there is no football ground located in Ramat Yisrael, they play their home matches at Southern Sportech Ground, Tel Aviv. Previously, the club played home matches at Kiryat Shalom, where they shared ground with Hapoel Kiryat Shalom.

The club is currently in Liga Bet South A division.

== History ==
The club was founded in 1993 and started at Liga Gimel, the lowest tier of Israeli football, where they played until they won Liga Gimel Tel Aviv division in the 2003–04 season and were promoted to Liga Bet. Ramat Yisrael played six seasons in Liga Bet South A division, until the 2009–10 season, in which they finished at the bottom and were relegated to Liga Gimel. After playing three seasons in the lowest tier, in the 2012–13 season, they finished on top of Tel Aviv division, level on points with Hapoel Abirei Bat Yam, which they faced in a decisive promotion play-off. Ramat Yisrael won 1–0 after extra time and were promoted to Liga Bet. In the following season, the club reached their best placing to date, when they finished eighth in Liga Bet South A division, three places short of the Promotion play-offs.

== Honours ==
=== League ===
Honour	No.	Years
Fifth tier	1	2012–13
Sixth tier	1	2003–04
