= Hapoel Isfiya F.C. =

Israeli football club

Hapoel Isfiya
- Full name: Hapoel Isfiya Football Club הפועל עוספיא
- Founded: 1973; 2003 (Refounded)
- Ground: Isfiya Ground, Isfiya
- Chairman: Slimane Marzok
- Manager: Slimane Abu Rukun
- League: Liga Gimel, Jezreel
- 2014–15: 3rd
Home colours	Away colours

Hapoel Isfiya (Hebrew: הפועל עוספיא) is a football club based in Isfiya in northern Israel. The club is currently in Liga Gimel, Jezreel division.

== History ==
Hapoel Isfiya has played their entire history in the lower divisions of Israeli football.

A previous club named Hapoel Isfiya was in existence in 1973. Hapoel joined Liga Dalet, the lowest tier of Israeli football at the time, and reached Liga Gimel by 1976. The club folded, and a new club was founded in the village, Maccabi Isfiya, which in its prime have reached Liga Alef, the third tier of Israeli football.

Hapoel Isfiya were re-established after Maccabi Isfiya had folded at the end of the 2002–03 season, and upon its re-establishment, received the players from the defunct club and joined Liga Gimel, Samaria division. In the following season, the club was transferred to the Jezreel division, and achieved promotion to Liga Bet, after the division winners, Hapoel Kfar Kama, had folded.

In 2005, the club became known as Hapoel Ironi HaCarmel, named after the short-lived Carmel City, which was a merger of Isfiya and Daliyat al-Karmel. However, after the merger was canceled in 2008, the club was renamed back to Hapoel Isfiya.

Hapoel Isfiya finished in fifth place of Liga Bet, North B division in both the 2009–10 and 2010–11 seasons, and qualified for the Promotion play-offs, where on both occasions, they lost 0–2 in the first round to Hapoel Iksal and F.C. Givat Olga respectively. In 2012–13, the club finished 13th and avoided relegation after beating F.C. Bu'eine 4–0 in the first round of the Relegation play-offs. However, in the following season, the club finished 12th and was relegated to Liga Gimel after losing in the Relegation play-offs 2–3 to Hapoel Umm al-Ghanem Nein and 0–1 to F.C. Tzeirei Tur'an in the decisive match.

== Honours ==
=== League ===
Honour	No.	Years
Sixth tier	1	2004–05

== In popular culture ==
Hapoel Isfiya appeared in the 34th episode, "Football", of the Israeli TV series Hafuch, when Anat (played by Einat Weitzman), became richer following an investment in the stock market, until she mistakenly bought Hapoel Isfiya. However, Hapoel Isfiya was a fictional football club at the time, since the TV series was filmed between 1996 and 1999, while the club came into existence in 2003.
