= Maccabi Ein Mahil F.C. =

Israeli football club

- Full name: Maccabi Ein Mahil Jamal Football Club
- Founded: 2007 (re-establishment)
- Ground: Kafr Manda Stadium
- Manager: Salah Abu Leil
- 2018–19: Liga Bet North B, 14th

Maccabi Ein Mahil (Hebrew: מכבי סולם) is an Israeli football club based in Ein Mahil. The club currently plays in .

== History ==
The current club was founded in 2007 after an earlier club with the same name folded at the beginning of the 2003–04 season In Israeli Football League, the club registered to play in Liga Gimel, where it was placed in the Upper Galilee division. The club played in this division for the following two seasons, before transferring to the Jezreel division, where the club finished as runners-up in 2009–10 and 2010–11, promoting to Liga Bet at the end of the 2010–11 season as one of the best runners-up. In 2014–15 the club finished 4th in its division and qualified for the promotion playoffs, losing to Hapoel Iksal 1–2 in the first round.
