= Otzma F.C. Holon =

Israeli football club

Otzma Holon
- Full name: Otzma F.C. Holon עוצמה מועדון כדורגל חולון
- Founded: 1994
- Ground: Municipal Stadium, Holon
- Capacity: 3,500
- Chairman: Hertzel Bostanai
- Manager: Avivi Zohar
- League: Liga Gimel Tel Aviv
- 2015–16: 9th
Home colours	Away colours

Otzma Holon (Hebrew: עוצמה חולון) is an Israeli football club based in Holon. The club is currently in Liga Gimel Tel Aviv division.

== History ==
The club was founded in 1994 and played its entire history in the lower divisions of Israeli football. Otzma reached Liga Bet, the fifth tier at the time, in the 2001–02 season and finished in the third place. Otzma remained in Liga Bet until the 2009–10 season (in which Liga Bet became the fourth tier), where the club finished second bottom in the South A division and relegated to Liga Gimel after losing the Relegation play-offs against Hapoel Mahane Yehuda and Ortodoxim Jaffa. In the 2011–12 season, the club won Liga Gimel Tel Aviv division and made a return to Liga Bet. In the 2013–14 season, Otzma faced their city rivals, Tzafririm Holon, for the first derby match between the top clubs of the city since the 1982–83 Liga Alef season, in which Hapoel Holon met with Tzafririm prior to their merger. Otzma won the derby by a result of 3–0.

In the 2014–15 season, the club finished at the bottom of South A division and relegated to Liga Gimel.

== Honours ==
- Liga Gimel Tel Aviv:
  - 2011–12
