= Hapoel F.C. Hevel Modi'in =

Israeli football club

- Full name: Hapoel Football Club Hevel Modi'in הפועל מועדון ספורט חבל מודיעין זוזיאן
- Founded: 2005
- Ground: Ahisamakh Ground, Ahisamakh
- Chairman: Avraham Lilus
- Manager: Moshe Shukrun
- League: Liga Gimel Central
- 2014–15: – (withdrew)
Home colours	Away colours

Hapoel F.C. Hevel Modi'in (Hebrew: הפועל מ.ס. חבל מודיעין) is an Israeli football club based in Hevel Modi'in Regional Council. The club is currently in Liga Gimel Central division.

== History ==
The club was founded in 2005 and joined Liga Gimel. The club made their only promotion to date at the end of the 2007–08 season, when they finished third in Liga Gimel Central division, and were promoted to Liga Bet after a spot was vacated in that league. However, the club spent only one season in Liga Bet, as they finished the 2008–09 season in the second bottom place of the South B division and dropped back to Liga Gimel.

The club finished the 2014–15 season as runners-up in Liga Gimel Central division, the best runners-up in Liga Gimel South divisions.
