= Beitar Kafr Kanna F.C. =

Israeli football club

Beitar Kafr Kanna
- Full name: Beitar Kafr Kanna Raduan בית״ר כפר כנא רדואן بيتار رضوان كفركنا
- Ground: Azmi Nassar Stadium, Kafr Kanna
- Capacity: 2,500
- Manager: Ahmad Mer'ee
- League: Liga Gimel
- 2023–24: Liga Gimel Lower Galilee, 7th

Beitar Kafr Kanna (Hebrew: בית״ר כפר כנא, Arabic: بيتار كفركنا) is an Israeli football club based in Kafr Kanna. The club currently plays in Liga Bet North A division.

== History ==
The club played mostly in the lower divisions of Israeli football until promoting to Liga Bet, then fifth tier, at the end if the 2003–04 season. The club played in Liga Bet for five seasons, relegating at the end of the 2008–09 season. In 2015 the club won its division and was promoted back to Liga Bet.

== Honours ==
=== League ===
Honour	No.	Years
Fifth tier	1	2014–15
