= Hapoel Tirat Shalom F.C. =

Israeli football club

Hapoel Tirat Shalom
- Full name: Hapoel Tirat Shalom Football Club הפועל טירת שלום
- Founded: 1973
- Ground: Ness Ziona Training Ground, Ness Ziona
- Chairman: Eliyahu Kochavi
- Manager: Leyman Vainberg
- League: Liga Gimel Central
- 2015–16: 6th
Home colours	Away colours

Hapoel Tirat Shalom (Hebrew: הפועל טירת שלום) is an Israeli football club based in the Tirat Shalom neighbourhood of Ness Ziona. The club is currently in Liga Gimel Central division.

== History ==
The club was founded in 1973 and started at Liga Dalet, then the sixth and lowest tier of Israeli football, where they played until the league was scrapped (in 1985), and as a result were promoted to Liga Gimel.

In the 2003–04 season, Tirat Shalom won Liga Gimel Central division and were promoted to Liga Bet, the fifth tier at the time. Tirat Shalom played six seasons in Liga Bet South B division, up until 2009–10 (the season in which Liga Bet became the fourth tier of Israeli football, following the closure of Liga Artzit), when they finished bottom and relegated to Liga Gimel, where they play today, at the Central division.

== Honours ==
=== League ===
Honour	No.	Years
Sixth tier	1	2003–04
