= Ironi Beit Shemesh F.C. =

Israeli football club

Ironi Beit Shemesh עירוני בית שמש
- Full name: Ironi Beit Shemesh Football Club עירוני בית שמש
- Ground: Ahisamakh Ground, Ahisamakh
- Chairman: Shalom Levy
- Manager: Shmuel Kozokin
- League: Liga Bet South B
- 2024–25: Liga Bet South B, 4th
Home colours	Away colours

Ironi Beit Shemesh (Hebrew: עירוני בית שמש) is an Israeli football club based in Beit Shemesh. The club is currently in Liga Bet South B division.

== History ==
The club was founded after Hapoel Beit Shemesh, which in its prime played in the second tier of Israeli football, dissolved in 1994 due to financial difficulties.

Up until the 2000–01 season, there were three football clubs operating in Beit Shemesh (Ironi, Maccabi and Beitar) which played in Liga Gimel, the lowest tier of Israeli football. However, due to financial reasons, a merger was created between the other football clubs from Beit Shemesh and Ironi Beit Shemesh.

In the 2010–11 season, the club finished runners-up in Liga Gimel Central division and faced Hapoel Hod HaSharon in a promotion play-off. Ironi Beit Shemesh lost 0–1 and remained in Liga Gimel. In the following season, Ironi Beit Shemesh finished third in the Central division and would normally remain in Liga Gimel. However, they were eventually promoted to Liga Bet in order to fill a vacated spot in that league, after Maccabi HaShikma Ramat Hen withdrew and Hapoel F.C. Giv'at Shmuel gave up their right to play in Liga Bet.

The club's best placing to date came at the 2012–13 season, when they finished tenth in Liga Bet South B division.
