= Beitar Giv'at Ze'ev F.C. =

Israeli football club

Beitar Givat Ze'ev בית"ר גבעת זאב
- Full name: Beitar Shabi Givat Ze'ev Football Club
- Short name: Givat Ze'ev
- Founded: 1999
- Ground: Givat Ze'ev Ground, Givat Ze'ev
- Capacity: 200
- Chairman: Gabi Peretz
- Manager: Mordi Vaaknin
- League: Liga Gimel
- 2023–24: Liga Gimel Central, 15th
Home colours	Away colours

Beitar Givat Ze'ev (Hebrew: בית"ר גבעת זאב) is an Israeli football club based in Givat Ze'ev. The club currently plays in Liga Bet South B division.

== History ==
The club was founded in 1999 and registered to play in Liga Gimel. The club was promoted to Liga Bet at the end of the following season, and was further promoted at the end of the 2002–03 season as the club won its division, staying in Liga Alef for three seasons before dropping back to Liga Bet, with a further relegation following in 2011. However, the club bounced back as it finished as runners-up in its division and was promoted back to Liga Bet.

== Honours ==
=== League ===
Honour	No.	Years
Fifth tier	1	2002–03

=== Cups ===
Honour	No.	Years
Liga Bet South B Division Cup	1	2008–09
