= F.C. Bnei Ra'anana =

Israeli football club

הפועל רעננה
- Full name: Moadon Kaduregel Bnei Ra'anana מועדון כדורגל הפועל רעננה
- Founded: 2005
- Ground: Karnei Oren Memorial Field, Ra'anana
- Chairman: Moris Lasri
- Manager: Eli Tzoref
- League: Liga Gimel Sharon
- 2015–16: 7th
Home colours	Away colours

F.C. Bnei Ra'anana (Hebrew: מועדון כדורגל בני רעננה) is an Israeli football club based in Ra'anana. The club is currently in Liga Gimel Sharon division.

== History ==
The club was founded in 2005 and joined Liga Gimel Sharon division, where they played nine successive seasons, until the 2013–14 season, when the club finished as runners-up and were promoted to Liga Bet, as the best runners-up in the South divisions, after two spots were vacated in that league, following the closures of Ironi Bat Yam (played in Liga Alef) and Maccabi Be'er Ya'akov.

The club's only season in Liga Bet turned up to be the worst ever of a club in that league, after they finished at the bottom of South B division, without points, losing in all their 28 games. In spite of that, the club had a chance to survive in Liga Bet, through the Relegation play-offs, after Hapoel Arad, which also played in the South B division, folded during the season. In the Relegation play-offs, after losing 1–5 to the 12th-placed club, Hapoel Rahat, Ra'anana faced the 13th-placed club, Beitar Yavne, in the decisive match. Against all odds, Ra'anana held their opponents into 1–1 draw in 120 minutes. However, in the Penalty shoot-out, Ra'anana were beaten 2–4 and relegated back to Liga Gimel.
