= Liga Dalet =

- Founded: 1958; 67 years ago 1969; 56 years ago
- Folded: 1959; 66 years ago 1985; 40 years ago
- Country: Israel
- Confederation: UEFA
- Level on pyramid: 6 / 6
- Promotion to: Liga Gimel
- Domestic cup(s): State Cup

Liga Dalet (Hebrew: ליגה ד', lit. D League) was the fifth (in 1958–59 and between 1969 and 1976) and sixth (between 1976 and 1985) tier, at the bottom of the Israeli football league system.

== History ==
Liga Dalet first came into existence in 1958 as a league added beneath Liga Gimel at the bottom of the Israeli football league system to accommodate the surplus number of teams from Liga Gimel. However, it operated for only one season because third tier Liga Bet was expanded to include 64 clubs. making room for more clubs in Liga gimel.

Liga Dalet was re-established in 1969, again as a fifth and bottom tier beneath Liga Gimel. In 1976, with the introduction of Liga Artzit at the second tier, Liga Dalet was demoted to the sixth tier. In 1985, as the number of clubs in the league system dwindled, Liga Dalet was cancelled and its remaining clubs were promoted to fifth tier Liga Gimel

== Structure ==
As the bottom tier of the league system, the league was divided into regional leagues with a changing number of teams in each division. The top club of each division was usually promoted to Liga Gimel, with further clubs promoted in order to complete vacancies in the league above.

Liga Dalet clubs participated in the State Cup, entering in the first round.
