= Ahi Acre F.C. =

Israeli football club

Ahi Acre
- Full name: Ahi Acre Football Club אחי עכו
- Founded: 2003
- Ground: Acre Municipal Stadium, Acre
- Capacity: 5,000
- Chairman: Ceasar Haddad
- Manager: Sakhnini Fared
- League: Liga Gimel
- 2024–25: Liga Bet North A, 15th (relegated)
Home colours	Away colours

Ahi Acre (Hebrew: אחי עכו) is an Israeli football club based in the Old City of Acre. The club is currently in Liga Bet North A division and play at the Acre Municipal Stadium.

== History ==
The club was founded in 2003 and joined Liga Gimel Western Galilee (now defunct) in the 2003–04 season, after the previous club from the Old City of Acre, Hapoel Bnei Acre, dissolved after it was last active in the previous season.

In the 2006–07 season, the club won Liga Gimel Upper Galilee division, and were promoted to Liga Bet. In the 2009–10 season, the club won Liga Bet North A division and were promoted to Liga Alef. In their first season in Liga Alef North division, Ahi Acre narrowly avoided the Relegation play-offs, after they finished eleventh. However, in the following season, they finished bottom, after winning only three games and relegated back to Liga Bet, where they play today.

== Honours ==
=== League ===
Honour	No.	Years
Fourth tier	1	2009–10
Sixth tier	1	2006–07

=== Cups ===
Honour	No.	Years
Liga Bet divisional State Cup	1	2007–08
