= Maccabi Be'er Ya'akov F.C. =

Maccabi Be'er Ya'akov
- Full name: Maccabi Be'er Ya'akov Football Club מכבי באר יעקב
- Founded: 2005; 21 years ago 2023; 3 years ago (refounded)
- Ground: Be'er Ya'akov Stadium, Be'er Ya'akov
- League: Liga Gimel Central
- 2013–14: Liga Alef South, 15th (Relegated)
| Home colours | Away colours |

Maccabi Be'er Ya'akov (Hebrew: מכבי באר יעקב) was an Israeli football club based in Be'er Ya'akov.

== History ==
The club was founded in 2005 after the previous club of the town, Hapoel Be'er Ya'akov, which has played in the past in Liga Alef, was dissolved. In their first season of existence, Maccabi was promoted to Liga Bet, after they finished runners-up in Liga Gimel Central-South division.

Their second season of existence, which was their first in Liga Bet, was successful, as they finished the 2006–07 season in third place in Liga Bet South B division. However, in the 2009–10 season, the club finished third bottom and was relegated to Liga Gimel after they lost in the decisive relegation play-off match against Beitar Giv'at Ze'ev. In the following season, the club made an immediate return to Liga Bet, after they won Liga Gimel Central division. In their comeback season In Liga Bet, they equaled their best achievement with another third-place finish and in the following season, they made history by winning Liga Bet South B division, and promoted to Liga Alef for the first time in their history.

During their 2013–14 season in Liga Alef South, the club entered administration, and as a result, was deducted nine points. The club finished second bottom and was relegated back to Liga Bet at the end of the season.

After major financial problems, the club dissolved in August 2014 and did not enter Liga Bet for the 2014–15 season.

== Honours ==
- Liga Bet South B:
  - 2012–13
- Liga Gimel Central:
  - 2010–11
