= Maccabi Ironi Jatt F.C. =

Maccabi Ironi Jatt Al-Ahli
- Full name: Maccabi Ironi Jatt Al-Ahli Football Club
- Founded: 1990s
- Dissolved: 2011
- Ground: HaShalom Stadium, Umm al-Fahm
- Capacity: 12,000
- 2010–11: Liga Leumit, 15th (relegated)
Home colours	Away colours

Maccabi Ironi Jatt Al-Ahli (Hebrew: מכבי עירוני ג'ת אלאהלי) was an Israeli football club based in Umm al-Fahm. The club played their home matches at the HaShalom Stadium.

== History ==
The club founded in the 1990s. In 2007–08, the club won Liga Gimel Samaria division and were promoted to Liga Bet. In the following season, they won Liga Bet North A division, and promoted to Liga Alef. The 2009–10 season saw a third successive promotion as the club won Liga Alef North and promotion to Liga Leumit. Just a season later, the club was relegated to Liga Alef after finishing in the 15th place.

In the 2011–12 season of Liga Alef South, the club withdrew after playing 8 matches. as they failed to show up for two matches in a row, the Israel Football Association ceased the club's activity and their results were annulled.

== Honours ==
- Liga Alef
  - North Division champions: 2009–10
- Liga Bet
  - North A Division champions: 2008–09
- Liga Gimel
  - Samaria Division champions: 2007–08
