= Maccabi Umm al-Fahm F.C. =

Israeli football club

Maccabi Umm al-Fahm
- Founded: 1972; 54 years ago 2020; 6 years ago as Tzeirei Umm al-Fahm
- Ground: HaShalom Stadium, Umm al-Fahm
- Capacity: 5,800
- Chairman: Ihab Mahameed
- Manager: Mohammed Abbas
- League: Liga Alef North
- 2024–25: Liga Alef North, 8th of 16
Home colours	Away colours

Maccabi Umm al-Fahm F.C. (Hebrew: מכבי אום אל פאחם) are a football club, from the north Israeli city of Umm al-Fahm. The club currently plays in Liga Bet North B division, the fourth tier of Israeli football. Home matches are played at the HaShalom Stadium.

== History ==
The club was founded in 1972, and played in the lower divisions of Israeli football. In the 2010–11 season the club won Liga Alef North division, and was promoted to Liga Leumit, the second tier of Israeli football, where they played three seasons.

In the 2013–14 season, the club was relegated to Liga Alef after finished bottom of Liga Leumit, and set negative record of being the first club in the history of professional football in Israel, which have finished a season with a negative number of points (−4, after 5 points deducted), and without any win, drawing one game, and losing all the other 36 games.

The 2014–15 season was similarly poor, as the club dropped further to Liga Bet, after finished the season with 0 points, following a deduction of 1 point for fielding ineligible player, and completed a second successive season without win, drawing one game, and losing all the other 29 games.

In the middle of the 2016/2017 season, Israel Football Association ruled that the team would be relegated to Liga Gimel at the end of the season, according to a FIFA ruling due to non-payment of a debt to one of its foreign players who played for it during the time the team played in the Liga Leumit.

In 2020 the club folded and re-founded as "Tzeirei Umm al-Fahm" in Liga Gimel Jezreel.

== Current squad ==
As to 20 September 2024

No.	Pos.	Nation	Player
1	GK	ISR	Daniel Benesh
3	DF	ISR	Dani Ayham Odeh
4	DF	ISR	Fadi Armeli
5	DF	ISR	Mohammed Abbas
6	MF	ISR	Mohammed Mahamid
7	MF	ISR	Mohammed Shadeeda
8	MF	ISR	Mohammed Mahamid II
9	FW	ISR	Mohameed Awadeh
11	FW	ISR	Qasem Helf
12	MF	ISR	Souhel Armeli
14	DF	ISR	Anis Mahamid

No.	Pos.	Nation	Player
15	MF	ISR	Atef Musa
17	DF	ISR	Ali Dahla
19	FW	ISR	Daniel Choscha
20	DF	ISR	Tomer Lebanon
23	MF	ISR	Mohammed Saadi
24	MF	ISR	Lion Edri
30	MF	ISR	Orel Duman
70	GK	ISR	Tomer Cohen
71	MF	ISR	Mohammed Jabareen
—	MF	ISR	Mohammed Abu Ras
—	MF	ISR	Marwan Kabha

== Honours ==
- Liga Alef North
  - Champions 2010–11
- Liga Bet North B
  - Champions 2008–09
- Liga Gimel Shomron
  - 2004–05
