= Hapoel al-Ittihad Nazareth F.C. =

Israeli football club

Hapoel al-Itihad Nazareth
- Full name: Hapoel al-Itihad Nazareth Football Club
- Founded: 1987
- Ground: Ilut Stadium
- Manager: Farhan Rashed
- League: Liga Gimel Jezreel
- 2015–16: 10th
Home colours	Away colours

Hapoel al-Ittihad Nazareth (Arabic: نادي كرة القدم الاتحاد الناصرة; Hebrew: הפועל אלאתיחאד נצרת) is an Israeli football club based in Nazareth, Israel. The club currently plays in Liga Gimel Jezreel division.

== History ==
The club was founded in 1987 as a youth club and as the youth players grew, the club opened a senior team and joined Liga Gimel, where the club has played ever since. The club never promoted from Liga Gimel and never made it to the advanced stages of the Israel State Cup.
