= Maccabi Ironi Amishav Petah Tikva F.C. =

Israeli football club

Maccabi Amishav Petah Tikva
- Full name: Maccabi Ironi Amishav Petah Tikva Football Club מכבי עירוני עמישב פתח תקוה
- Founded: 1997
- Ground: Sportek Stadium, Kfar Sirkin
- Chairman: Avihai Shitrit
- Manager: Eli Michaeli
- League: Liga Bet South A
- 2024–25: Liga Bet South A, 8th
Home colours	Away colours

Maccabi Ironi Amishav Petah Tikva (Hebrew: מכבי עירוני עמישב פתח תקוה) is an Israeli football club based in the Amishav neighbourhood of Petah Tikva.It currently competes in the Liga Bet South A division, playing home matches at the Sportek Stadium in Kfar Sirkin.

== History ==
Since the 1960s, the football club which have operated in the Amishav neighborhood was Hapoel Amishav Petah Tikva. however, they were folded after failed attempt of merging with other Petah Tikva clubs, Hapoel Mahane Yehuda and Beitar Petah Tikva. one season later, in 1997, Maccabi Amishav Petah Tikva was founded, and started in Liga Gimel, the lowest tier of Israeli football.

In the 2004–05 season, the club won Liga Gimel Sharon division, and was promoted to Liga Bet, after 19 wins and one draw, scoring 88 goals and conceding 11. in their first season in Liga Bet, former Israeli top flight players, Liron Basis and Alon Mizrahi joined the club, and at the end of the season, Maccabi Amishav won Liga Bet South A division, and made another successive promotion, this time to Liga Alef. the club played two seasons in Liga Alef, and was relegated back to Liga Bet at the 2007–08 season, after finished second bottom. in the following season in Liga Bet, the club finished second, and even though they lost in the promotion play-offs to the third bottom club in Liga Alef South, Hapoel Nahlat Yehuda, they were eventually promoted, as one spot in Liga Alef was vacated, after Hapoel Umm al-Fahm folded.

Following their return to Liga Alef, the club have also established a youth section.

== Honours ==
- Liga Bet South A:
  - 2005–06
- Liga Gimel Sharon:
  - 2004–05
