= F.C. Bnei Jaffa Ortodoxim =

Israeli football club

- Full name: Moadon Sport Bnei Jaffa Ortodoxim מועדון ספורט בני יפו אורתודוכסים
- Founded: 2012
- Ground: Tzeirei Jaffa Ground, Tel Aviv
- Chairman: Kosta Khauji
- Manager: Bashir Kabha
- League: Liga Bet South A
- 2024–25: Liga Bet South A, 12th
Home colours	Away colours

F.C. Bnei Jaffa Ortodoxim (Hebrew: מועדון ספורט בני יפו אורתודוקסים), Moadon Sport Bnei Jaffa Ortodoxim, lit. Bnei Jaffa Orthodox Sport Club (or in short Hebrew: מ.ס. בני יפו אורתודוקסים Mem Samekh Bnei Jaffa Ortodoxim, lit. F.C. Bnei Jaffa Orthodox) is an Israeli football club based in Jaffa, Tel Aviv. The club is the result of the merger of F.C. Bnei Jaffa and Hapoel F.C. Ortodoxim Jaffa. They are currently in Liga Bet South A division.

== History ==
The club was founded in 2012 by Arab-Israelis as the result of the merger of F.C. Bnei Jaffa and Hapoel F.C. Ortodoxim Jaffa, which at the time, were both playing in Liga Bet South A division.

=== F.C. Bnei Jaffa ===
The club was founded in 1963 as Hapoel Ihud Tzeirei Jaffa. Tzeirei Jaffa played in Liga Alef, the third tier of Israeli football (the fourth from 1999 to 2009), in two different spells, which ended in relegation to Liga Bet in both 1984–85 and 2000–01 seasons. their best placing was the third place in Liga Alef South at the 1983–84 season. The club folded in 2001 due to major financial problems, and re-established in 2003 under a new name, Hapoel Ihud Bnei Jaffa, since it was impossible to use the original name, due to its deep debts. Hapoel Ihud Bnei Jaffa played with that name until the 2007–08 season, in which they finished fifth in Liga Gimel Tel Aviv division. Prior to the 2008–09 season, they merged with Liga Bet club, A.S. Ramat Eliyahu, which already merged after the 1999–2000 season with Maccabi Jaffa. The merged club became F.C. Bnei Jaffa and inherited Ramat Eliyahu's spot in Liga Bet South A division.

=== Hapoel F.C. Ortodoxim Jaffa ===
The club, which was also known as HaTzofim HaOrtodoxim, was founded in 1970 as part of the sports activities of Christian Orthodox Scout Association, which was founded in 1966. The club played in Liga Gimel, the lowest tier of Israeli football up until the 2006–07 season, when they finished runners-up in Liga Gimel Tel Aviv division and were promoted to Liga Bet.

=== After the merger ===
The merger between F.C. Bnei Jaffa and Hapoel F.C. Ortodoxim Jaffa was signed on 29 July 2012. The first season of the merged club was successful, as they finished fifth in Liga Bet South A division and qualified for the promotion play-offs, where they lost in the first round 2–3 to F.C. Kafr Qasim, which were eventually promoted to Liga Alef. The following season ended in ninth-place finish.

== Honours ==
=== League ===
Honour	No.	Years
Fourth tier	2	1982–83^{1}, 2015–16
Fifth tier	1	1978–79^{1}

^{1}As Hapoel Ihud Tzeirei Jaffa
