= 2016–17 Israel State Cup =

Tournament details
- Country: Israel

Final positions
- Champions: Bnei Yehuda
- Runner-up: Maccabi Tel Aviv

Tournament statistics
- Top goal scorer(s): Nir Dadon (Hapoel Bnei Ashdod F.C.) (7 goals)

The 2016–17 Israel State Cup (Hebrew: גביע המדינה, Gvia HaMedina) was the 78th season of Israel's nationwide Association football cup competition and the 63rd after the Israeli Declaration of Independence.

The competition commenced in September 2016, and the final was held on 25 May 2017. The competition was won by Bnei Yehuda who had beaten Maccabi Tel Aviv on penalties after 0–0 in the final.

== Preliminary rounds ==
=== First to fourth rounds ===
Rounds 1 to 4 double as cup competition for each division in Liga Bet and Liga Gimel. The two third-round winners from each Liga Bet division and the fourth-round winner from each Liga Gimel division advance to the sixth round.

==== Liga Bet ====
===== Liga Bet North A =====
Home team	Score	Away team
First round
Maccabi Bnei Nahf	w/o	Maccabi Sektzia Ma'alot-Tarshiha
Ahva Kafr Manda	w/o	Ihud Bnei Majd al-Krum
Hapoel Kaukab	1–2	Hapoel Bu'eine
Second round
Hapoel Shefa-'Amr	2–0	Beitar Nahariya
F.C. Julis	1–3	Beitar Haifa
Hapoel Bu'eine	1–2	Ihud Bnei Majd al-Krum
Beitar Kafr Kanna	1–2	Maccabi Sektzia Ma'alot-Tarshiha
Third round
Hapoel Shefa-'Amr	0–2	Ihud Bnei Majd al-Krum
Beitar Haifa	7–0	Maccabi Sektzia Ma'alot-Tarshiha
Fourth round
Ihud Bnei Majd al-Krum	1–0	Beitar Haifa

1. From North B.

===== Liga Bet North B =====
Home team	Score	Away team
First round
Hapoel Bnei Arara 'Ara	0–0 (a.e.t.) (6–7 p)	Ihud Bnei Kafr Qara
Hapoel Ramot Menashe Megiddo	0–3	F.C. Daburiyya
Al-Nahda Nazareth	0–1	Maccabi Ein Mahil
Second round
Maccabi Ein Mahil	w/o	Ihud Bnei Kafr Qara
Hapoel Bnei Zalafa	3–1	Hapoel Tirat HaCarmel
Hapoel Umm al-Fahm	7–0	Maccabi Ironi Yafa
Maccabi Ahi Iksal	0–1	F.C. Daburiyya
Third round
Ihud Bnei Kafr Qara	4–0	F.C. Daburiyya
Hapoel Umm al-Fahm	2–2 (a.e.t.) (3–2 p)	Hapoel Bnei Zalafa
Fourth round
Hapoel Umm al-Fahm	0–2	Ihud Bnei Kafr Qara

===== Liga Bet South A =====
Home team	Score	Away
First round
Maccabi Amishav Petah Tikva	2–1	Hapoel Pardesiya
F.C. Ironi Or Yehuda	2–0	Beitar Petah Tikva
Hapoel Tzafririm Holon	3–0	Hapoel Kiryat Ono
Hapoel Nahlat Yehuda	3–2	Shimshon Tel Aviv
Beitar Ramat Gan	2–3	F.C. Tzeirei Tayibe
Hapoel Ihud Bnei Jatt	1–0	Hapoel Kafr Qasim Shouaa
Second round
F.C. Ironi Or Yehuda	1–1 (a.e.t.) (6–5 p)	Hapoel Tzafririm Holon
Hapoel Ihud Bnei Jatt	3–2	F.C. Roei Heshbon Tel Aviv
Maccabi Amishav Petah Tikva	0–2	A.S. Holon
Third round
F.C. Ironi Or Yehuda	0–0 (a.e.t.) (5–6 p)	A.S. Holon
Hapoel Ihud Bnei Jatt	2–1	F.C. Tzeirei Tayibe
Fourth round
A.S. Holon	3–2	Hapoel Ihud Bnei Jatt

===== Liga Bet South B =====
Home team	Score	Away team
First round
Beitar Yavne	1–3 (a.e.t.)	Tzeirei Rahat
Maccabi Ashdod	1–0	Maccabi Be'er Sheva
Beitar Giv'at Ze'ev	0–2	Nordia Jerusalem
Second round
Ironi Modi'in	0–2	Nordia Jerusalem
Maccabi Ironi Netivot	1–2	Bnei Eilat
Maccabi Kiryat Malakhi	2–1	Maccabi Ashdod
Third round
Nordia Jerusalem	3–2 (a.e.t.)	Maccabi Kiryat Malakhi
Tzeirei Rahat	2–0	Bnei Eilat
Fourth round
Tzeirei Rahat	3–1	Nordia Jerusalem

==== Liga Gimel ====
===== Liga Gimel Upper Galilee =====
Home team	Score	Away team
First round
	–	
Second round
Hapoel Merom HaGalil	3–1	Hapoel Bnei Tuba Zangarriyea
Third round
Bnei HaGolan	6–2	F.C. Aramshe Danun
Fourth round
Hapoel Merom HaGalil	2–6	Bnei HaGolan

===== Liga Gimel Lower Galilee =====
Home team	Score	Away team
First round
	–	
Second round
	–	
Third round
	–	
Fourth round
F.C. Kfar Kama	w/o	F.C. Tzeirei Tamra

===== Liga Gimel Jezreel =====
Home team	Score	Away team
First round
	–	
Second round
Maccabi Ahi Ar'ara 'Ara	w/o	Ihud Bnei Baqa
Third round
Hapoel Bnei Musmus	3–0	Maccabi Ahi Ar'ara 'Ara
Bnei Musheirifa Baiada	w/o	F.C. Nazareth Illit
Fourth round
F.C. Nazareth Illit	0–4	Hapoel Bnei Musmus

===== Liga Gimel Shomron =====
Home team	Score	Away team
First round
	–	
Second round
Beitar Pardes Hanna	w/o	Hapoel Ironi Or Akiva
Hapoel Kiryat Haim	1–7	Hapoel Ahva Haifa
Maccabi Neve Sha'anan	1–3	Hapoel Bnei Fureidis
Third round
Hapoel Ahva Haifa	1–1 (a.e.t.) (4–3 p)	Hapoel Bnei Fureidis
Fourth round
Hapoel Ahva Haifa	1–1 (a.e.t.) (5–3 p)	Beitar Pardes Hanna

===== Liga Gimel Sharon =====
Home team	Score	Away team
First round
F.C. Netanya	1–3	Bnei Ra'anana
Hapoel Oranit	1–2 (a.e.t.)	Maccabi HaSharon Netanya
Second round
Bnei Ra'anana	3–2	Beitar Tubruk
Ironi Ariel	4–1	Maccabi HaSharon Netanya
Bnei Qalansawe	7–1	Shimshon Bnei Tayibe
Hapoel Kafr Bara	0–3	Hapoel Jaljulia
Third round
Bnei Ra'anana	0–5	Bnei Qalansawe
Hapoel Jaljulia	0–2	Ironi Ariel
Fourth round
Bnei Qalansawe	1–2 (a.e.t.)	Ironi Ariel

===== Liga Gimel Tel Aviv =====
Home team	Score	Away team
First round
Shikun Vatikim Ramat Gan	w/o	Beitar Jaffa
Maccabi HaShikma Hen	1–0	Maccabi Ironi Or Yehuda
Bnei Yehud	3–3 (a.e.t.) (2–4 p)	AS Sporting Tel Aviv
Hapoel Neve Golan	w/o	Beitar Ezra
Second round
Shikun Vatikim Ramat Gan	0–2	Elitzur Jaffa Tel Aviv
Beitar Ezra	0–4	Otzma Holon
Elitzur Yehud	1–2	Ironi Beit Dagan
Maccabi HaShikma Hen	3–1	AS Sporting Tel Aviv
Third round
Ironi Beit Dagan	3–1	Maccabi HaShikma Hen
Otzma Holon	4–2	Elitzur Jaffa Tel Aviv
Fourth round
Otzma Holon	1–3	Ironi Beit Dagan

===== Liga Gimel Center =====
Home team	Score	Away team
First round
A.S. Ashdod	w/o	Hapoel Matzliah
Hapoel Gedera	w/o	Beitar Ashdod
Hapoel Tirat Shalom	w/o	Hapoel Ramla
F.C. Rishon LeZion	1–6	Hapoel Bnei Ashdod
Maccabi Kiryat Ekron	5–0	Hapoel Mevaseret Zion
Second round
Ironi Lod	1–6	A.S. Ashdod
Hapoel Bnei Ashdod	5–1	Hapoel Tirat Shalom
Tzeirei Lod	0–1	Maccabi Kiryat Ekron
Third round
Hapoel Bnei Ashdod	0–1	A.S. Ashdod
Maccabi Kiryat Ekron	3–3 (a.e.t.) (3–4 p)	Hapoel Gedera
Fourth round
A.S. Ashdod	4–0	Hapoel Gedera

===== Liga Gimel South =====
Home team	Score	Away team
First round
Second round
Hapoel Yeruham	3–1	F.C. Be'er Sheva
F.C. Tzeirei al-Hoshla	1–9	A.S. Ashkelon
Maccabi Dimona	1–2	Hapoel Rahat
F.C. Arad	5–3	Hapoel Ar'arat an-Naqab
Third round
Hapoel Yeruham	6–1	A.S. Ashkelon
F.C. Arad	6–2	Hapoel Rahat
Fourth round
F.C. Arad	0–4	Hapoel Yeruham

=== Fifth round ===
The fifth round is played within each division of Liga Alef. The winners qualify to the sixth round

Home team	Score	Away team
Liga Alef North
F.C. Karmiel Safed	6–2 (a.e.t.)	Tzeirei Kafr Kanna
Maccabi Tzur Shalom	4–1	Hapoel Migdal HaEmek
F.C. Haifa Robi Shapira	1–2	Maccabi Daliyat al-Karmel
Ironi Tiberias	0–1	Maccabi Ironi Kiryat Ata F.C.
Hapoel Ironi Baqa al-Gharbiyye	0–1	Hapoel Asi Gilboa
Hapoel Hadera	0–0 (a.e.t.) (5–4 p)	Hapoel Beit She'an
Hapoel Iksal	3–0	Hapoel Kafr Kanna
Hapoel Herzliya	1–1 (a.e.t.) (4–5 p)	F.C. Tira
Liga Alef South
Hapoel Hod HaSharon	2–1	Maccabi Kiryat Gat
F.C. Shikun HaMizrah	0–2	Maccabi Kabilio Jaffa
Bnei Jaffa Ortodoxim	0–2	Hakoah Amidar Ramat Gan
F.C. Dimona	0–1	Hapoel Kfar Shalem
Maccabi Yavne	5–1	Sektzia Nes Tziona
F.C. Kafr Qasim	2–0 (a.e.t.)	Hapoel Azor
Beitar Kfar Saba	1–1 (a.e.t.) (4–3 p)	Hapoel Marmorek
Hapoel Bik'at HaYarden	3–2 (a.e.t.)	Hapoel Mahane Yehuda

== Nationwide Rounds ==
=== Sixth round ===
Home team	Score	Away team
F.C. Karmiel Safed	0–2	Beitar Haifa
Hapoel Hod HaSharon	1–1 (a.e.t.) (4–3 p)	Maccabi Yavne
Maccabi Daliyat al-Karmel	2–3 (a.e.t.)	Hapoel Umm al-Fahm
Hapoel Kfar Shalem	2–0	Nordia Jerusalem
Ironi Ariel	0–3	A.S. Holon
Hapoel Asi Gilboa	3–1	Bnei HaGolan
Ironi Beit Dagan	0–2	Beitar Kfar Saba
Hapoel Bik'at HaYarden	2–0 (a.e.t.)	Hapoel Ihud Bnei Jatt
Hapoel Bnei Musmus	0–2	Maccabi Tzur Shalom
Maccabi Kabilio Jaffa	2–0	A.S. Ashdod
Hapoel Yeruham	0–1	F.C. Kafr Qasim
Ihud Bnei Majd al-Krum	3–4 (a.e.t.)	Maccabi Ironi Kiryat Ata F.C.
Hapoel Hadera	5–0	F.C. Tzeirei Tamra
Hapoel Iksal	1–0	F.C. Tira
Tzeirei Rahat	3–0	Hakoah Amidar Ramat Gan
Hapoel Ahva Haifa	2–4 (a.e.t.)	Ihud Bnei Kafr Qara

=== Seventh round ===
Home team	Score	Away team
Beitar Haifa	0–2	Maccabi Sha'arayim
Hapoel Bik'at HaYarden	1–4	Maccabi Ironi Kiryat Ata
Hapoel Asi Gilboa	2–4	Hapoel Iksal
Maccabi Tzur Shalom F.C.	3–1	Hapoel Petah Tikva
A.S. Holon	0–5	Hapoel Jerusalem
Ihud Bnei Kafr Qara	0–1	Hapoel Hod HaSharon
F.C. Tzeirei Rahat	1–1 (a.e.t.) (0–2 p.)	F.C. Kafr Qasim
Hapoel Bnei Lod	4–1	Hapoel Kfar Shalem
Hapoel Rishon LeZion	5–3	Hapoel Hadera
Hapoel Ramat Gan	4–0	Beitar Kfar Saba
Hapoel Nazareth Illit	1–0	Ironi Nesher
Hapoel Umm al-Fahm	1–1 (a.e.t.) (1–4 p.)	Maccabi Jaffa
Hapoel Nir Ramat HaSharon	3–0	Hapoel Katamon
Maccabi Herzliya	2–3	Hapoel Afula

=== Eighth round ===
Home team	Score	Away team
Hapoel Haifa	6–1	F.C. Kafr Qasim
Hapoel Ashkelon	5–2	Maccabi Jaffa
Hapoel Acre	3–3 (a.e.t.) (3–4 p.)	Bnei Yehuda
Maccabi Sha'arayim	1–3	Bnei Sakhnin
Hapoel Be'er Sheva	2–0	Maccabi Tzur Shalom
Hapoel Ra'anana	4–1	Maccabi Ahi Nazareth
Hapoel Hod HaSharon	0–1 (a.e.t.)	Ironi Kiryat Shmona
Maccabi Ironi Kiryat Ata	0–3	Hapoel Ramat Gan
Hapoel Iksal	1–3 (a.e.t.)	F.C. Ashdod
Beitar Tel Aviv Ramla	2–1	Hapoel Nazareth Illit
Hapoel Jerusalem	3–2	Hapoel Afula
Maccabi Netanya	1–2 (a.e.t.)	Hapoel Rishon LeZion
Maccabi Haifa	0–2	Maccabi Petah Tikva
Hapoel Bnei Lod	0–3	Maccabi Tel Aviv
Beitar Jerusalem	3–0	Hapoel Kfar Saba
Hapoel Tel Aviv	1–0	Hapoel Nir Ramat HaSharon

=== Round of 16 ===
Home team	Score	Away team
Beitar Jerusalem	2–1	Bnei Sakhnin
Hapoel Haifa	3–0	Hapoel Rishon LeZion
Hapoel Ashkelon	0–4	Bnei Yehuda
Hapoel Tel Aviv	0–2	Maccabi Petah Tikva
Hapoel Jerusalem	0–0 (a.e.t.) (3–4 p.)	Hapoel Ramat Gan
F.C. Ashdod	1–1 (a.e.t.) (5–4 p.)	Beitar Tel Aviv Ramla
Hapoel Be'er Sheva	1–2	Ironi Kiryat Shmona
Hapoel Ra'anana	1–1 (a.e.t.) (2–4 p.)	Maccabi Tel Aviv

=== Quarter-finals ===
Team 1	Agg.	Team 2	1st leg	2nd leg
Maccabi Petah Tikva	1–3	Maccabi Tel Aviv	0–1	1–2
Beitar Jerusalem	2–1	Ironi Kiryat Shmona	2–0	0–1
F.C. Ashdod	1–6	Bnei Yehuda	1–4	0–2
Hapoel Haifa	3–4	Hapoel Ramat Gan	1–1	1–2

=== Semi-finals ===
5 April 2017	Beitar Jerusalem	1–2	Maccabi Tel Aviv	Haifa
	Hen Ezra 89'		18' Aaron Schoenfeld; 60' Dor Micha	Stadium: Sammy Ofer Stadium; Attendance: 29,250

4 April 2017	Bnei Yehuda	1–0	Hapoel Ramat Gan	Netanya
	Yonatan Cohen 22'			Stadium: Netanya Stadium; Attendance: 7,630

=== Final ===
25 May 2017	Bnei Yehuda	0–0 (4–3 p)	Maccabi Tel Aviv	Jerusalem
				Stadium: Teddy Stadium; Attendance: 27,800; Referee: Eli Hacmon
	Penalties
	Valskis (penalty missed); Jovanović (penalty scored); Buzaglo (penalty scored); Gordana (penalty missed); Yonatan Cohen (penalty scored); Stav Finish (penalty scored)		(penalty scored) Alberman; (penalty scored) Rikan; (penalty scored) Kjartansson; (penalty missed) Scarione; (penalty missed) Benayoun; (penalty missed) Ben Haim I
