= 2015–16 Liga Gimel =

Israeli football season

The 2015–16 Liga Gimel season was the 48th season of fifth tier football in Israel, with 108 clubs competing in 8 regional divisions for promotion to Liga Bet.

League matches began on 9 October 2015 and ended on 7 May 2016.

== Review and events ==
- At the beginning of the season, Liga Gimel clubs competed in the State Cup, the first four rounds played within each division, with the divisional winners qualifying to the nationwide sixth round. F.C. Hatzor HaGlilit (from Upper Galilee division), Hapoel Bnei Arara 'Ara (from Jezreel division), Hapoel Ironi Or Akiva (from Samaria division) and Hapoel Ihud Bnei Jatt (from Sharon division) all won their divisional finals, played on October 2, 2015. The rest of the divisional finals were played on October 20, 2015, with Shimshon Tel Aviv (Tel Aviv division), Nordia Jerusalem (Central division) and Maccabi Ashdod (South division) winning their matches. F.C. Tzeirei Tamra (Lower Galilee division) also won its divisional cup, as its opponent, Haopel Bnei Nujeidat failed to appear to the final.
- On November 26, 2015, following an IFA Disciplinary Committee decision regarding an abandoned match between Hapoel F.C. Hevel Modi'in and Hapoel Ramla, in which the committee decided that both clubs share responsibility for the match being abandoned, F.C. Hevel Modi'in announced its resignation from the league and forfeited its next match against Hapoel Ironi Gedera.
- On December 4, 2015, during an Upper Galilee division match between Bnei Ma'alot Tashiha and F.C. Hatzor HaGlilit, a Ma'alot-Tarshiha player, Asher Elfasi, attacked the referee and the match was abandoned. Elfasi received a lifetime ban.

== Upper Galilee Division ==
Pos	Team	Pld	W	D	L	GF	GA	GD	Pts	Promotion
1	F.C. Julis	24	20	3	1	80	22	+58	63	Promotion to Liga Bet
2	Bnei HaGolan VeHaGalil	24	19	4	1	92	16	+76	60 (Note: The first round match between Hapoel Bnei Peki'in and Bnei HaGolan VeHaGalil was abandoned at the 90th minute as the two teams' benches and several players started fighting. As the two teams were guilty of the match abandonment, the result was set as a 0–0 with no points awarded.)	
3	F.C. Hatzor HaGlilit	24	18	3	3	66	18	+48	57	
4	Hapoel Bnei Rameh	24	15	5	4	62	32	+30	50	
5	F.C. Aramshe Danun	24	11	2	11	52	49	+3	35	
6	Hapoel Bnei Hurfeish	24	10	5	9	49	44	+5	35	
7	Hapoel Bnei Peki'in	24	10	5	9	45	38	+7	34	
8	Maccabi Ahva Yarka	24	9	2	13	47	64	−17	29	
9	Hapoel Merom HaGalil	24	6	2	16	36	73	−37	20	
10	Hapoel Bnei Bi'ina	24	5	4	15	31	76	−45	19	
11	Hapoel Tarshiha	24	5	2	17	40	71	−31	17	
12	Hapoel Jatt Yanuh HaGlilit (Note: On 26 March 2016, Hapoel Jatt Yanuh HaGlilit failed to show for a match against Hapoel Bnei Bi'ina. As this was the third time the club fails to show for a match, the club was expelled from the league, with their results standing and their remaining two matches forfeited.)	24	4	2	18	21	63	−42	14	
13	Hapoel Nahariya	24	2	5	17	31	86	−55	11	
–	Bnei Ma'alot Tarshiha (Note: On 4 March 2016, a match between F.C. Hatzor HaGlilit and Bnei Ma'alot Tarshiha was abandoned at the 20th minute, with Hatzor HaGlilit leading 3–0, as Ma'alot Tarshiha players left the pitch after conceding the third goal of the match. The club was expelled from the league and its results were annulled.)	0	0	0	0	0	0	0	−2 (Note: On 4 December 2015, during a match between Bnei Ma'alot Tashiha and F.C. Hatzor HaGlilit, a Ma'alot-Tarshiha player, Asher Elfasi, attacked the referee and the match was abandoned. Elfasi received a lifetime ban and the club had two points deducted.)	

Updated to match(es) played on 16 April 2016. Source: IFA (in Hebrew)
Rules for classification: 1st points; 2nd matches won; 3rd head-to-head; 4th deciding match

== Lower Galilee Division ==
Pos	Team	Pld	W	D	L	GF	GA	GD	Pts	Promotion
1	Maccabi Tzeirei Shefa-'Amr	22	19	1	2	53	9	+44	58 (Note: AAR–TzS 0–0; TzS–AAR 1–0)	Promotion to Liga Bet
2	Ahva Arraba	22	19	1	2	56	14	+42	58	Promotion to Liga Bet
3	Ironi Bnei Sha'ab	22	18	2	2	57	26	+31	56	
4	Maccabi Kafr Manda	22	12	3	7	51	27	+24	39	
5	F.C. Halat el-Sharif	22	8	5	9	35	32	+3	29	
6	F.C. Tzeirei Tamra	22	8	3	11	39	39	0	26 (Note: On 31 January 2016, a match between F.C. Tzeirei Tamra and Ahva Arraba was abandoned on the 67th minute due to crowd violence. For its part in the riot, Tzeirei Tamra had one point deducted.)	
7	Hapoel Ironi Bnei I'billin	22	7	1	14	34	58	−24	22	
8	Maccabi Ironi Tamra	22	6	4	12	25	34	−9	22	
9	Haopel Bnei Nujeidat	22	6	2	14	25	56	−31	20	
10	Hapoel Bnei Deir al-Asad	22	6	1	15	42	67	−25	19	
11	F.C. Bnei Arraba	22	5	1	16	34	66	−32	16	
12	Maccabi Basmat Tab'un	22	4	4	14	26	49	−23	16	
–	F.C. Tzeirei Ibtin Khawaled (Note: On 18 January 2016, F.C. Tzeirei Ibtin Khawaled failed to show for a match against Hapoel Ironi Bnei I'billin. As this was the third time the club failed to show to a match, it was expelled from the league and its results were annulled.)	0	0	0	0	0	0	0	0	
–	Maccabi Bnei Deir Hanna (Note: On 13 February 2016, a match between Maccabi Bnei Deir Hanna and F.C. Halat el-Sharif was cancelled due to absence of the mandatory security stewards for the match. As Deir Hanna already was on probation following several instances of failing to show to a match, the club was expelled from the league and its results were annulled.)	0	0	0	0	0	0	0	0	

Updated to match(es) played on 16 April 2016. Source: IFA (in Hebrew)
Rules for classification: 1st points; 2nd matches won; 3rd head-to-head; 4th deciding match

== Jezreel Division ==
Pos	Team	Pld	W	D	L	GF	GA	GD	Pts	Promotion
1	Hapoel Bnei Arara 'Ara	22	19	3	0	67	13	+54	60	Promotion to Liga Bet
2	Hapoel Bnei Fureidis	22	17	3	2	62	20	+42	54	
3	Hapoel Isfiya	22	13	2	7	55	25	+30	41	
4	Bnei Musheirifa Baiada	22	10	5	7	28	26	+2	35	
5	Beitar Afula	22	8	3	11	51	57	−6	27	
6	F.C. Nazareth Illit	22	8	2	12	40	56	−16	26	
7	Maccabi Ahi Arara 'Ara	22	7	5	10	31	42	−11	26	
8	Beitar Umm al-Fahm	22	7	4	11	27	39	−12	25 (Note: BUF–MUS 1–2; MUS–BUF 0–3)	
9	Hapoel Bnei Musmus	22	7	4	11	28	39	−11	25	
10	Hapoel al-Ittihad Nazareth	22	7	2	13	37	52	−15	23	
11	Beitar Ein Mahil	22	6	3	13	26	51	−25	21	
12	F.C. Kfar Kama	22	4	2	16	22	54	−32	14	
–	Beitar al-Amal Nazareth (Note: On 2 Match 2016, Beitar al-Amal Nazareth failed to show for a match against Bnei Musheirifa Baiada. The club was expelled from the league and its results annulled.)	0	0	0	0	0	0	0	−1 (Note: On 20 February 2016, a match between Beitar al-Amal Nazareth and Hapoel Bnei Fureidis was abandoned at the 43rd minute as a Beitar al-Amal player, Masud Odetallah stormed into the stands in attempt to attack several visiting fans that verbally assaulted him. The referee dismissed the player and blew for half-time. However, as the referee tried to restart the match after the break, Odetallah refused to leave the pitch, causing the match to be abandoned. For the club's part in the match abandonment, the club had one point deducted.)	

Updated to match(es) played on 16 April 2016. Source: IFA (in Hebrew)
Rules for classification: 1st points; 2nd matches won; 3rd head-to-head; 4th deciding match

== Samaria Division ==
Pos	Team	Pld	W	D	L	GF	GA	GD	Pts	Promotion or relegation
1	Hapoel Tirat HaCarmel	24	18	5	1	79	19	+60	59	Promotion to Liga Bet
2	Hapoel Kiryat Yam	24	18	4	2	78	12	+66	58	Promotion to Liga Bet
3	Maccabi Isfiya	24	17	1	6	71	38	+33	52	
4	Maccabi Ironi Barta'a	24	14	6	4	64	31	+33	48	
5	Maccabi Neve Sha'anan Eldad	24	12	4	8	51	41	+10	40	
6	Maccabi Tirat HaCarmel	24	10	5	9	55	53	+2	35	
7	Hapoel Ironi Or Akiva	24	9	7	8	42	34	+8	34	
8	Beitar Pardes Hanna	24	9	7	8	42	34	+8	34	
9	Hapoel Ahva Haifa	24	7	1	16	48	94	−46	22	
10	Beitar Hadera	24	6	0	18	27	82	−55	18	
11	Hapoel Bnei Jisr az-Zarqa	24	5	1	18	43	78	−35	15 (Note: EaS–JaZ 2–1; JaZ–EaS 7–1) (Note: Hapoel Bnei Jisr az-Zarqa had fielded an ineligible player in two matches and had one point deducted.)	
12	Hapoel Ein as-Sahala	24	5	0	19	20	81	−61	15	
13	Hapoel Halissa	24	4	2	18	20	62	−42	14	

Updated to match(es) played on 15 April 2016. Source: IFA (in Hebrew)
Rules for classification: 1st points; 2nd matches won; 3rd head-to-head; 4th deciding match

== Sharon Division ==
Pos	Team	Pld	W	D	L	GF	GA	GD	Pts	Promotion
1	Hapoel Ihud Bnei Jatt	24	19	1	4	71	19	+52	58	Promotion to Liga Bet
2	Bnei Qalansawe	24	17	3	4	45	28	+17	54	
3	Ironi Ariel	24	17	1	6	74	30	+44	52	
4	Hapoel Jaljulia	24	15	4	5	45	28	+17	49	
5	Shimshon Kafr Qasim	24	14	3	7	57	33	+24	45	
6	Maccabi HaSharon Netanya	24	12	4	8	60	51	+9	40	
7	Bnei Ra'anana	24	11	1	12	61	67	−6	34	
8	Hapoel Oranit	24	8	6	10	41	54	−13	30	
9	Hapoel Kafr Bara	24	7	5	12	50	63	−13	26	
10	F.C. Kafr Qasim Nibrass	24	7	2	15	32	70	−38	23	
11	Shimshon Bnei Tayibe	24	5	1	18	25	55	−30	16	
12	F.C. Netanya	24	2	6	16	23	65	−42	12	
13	Beitar Tubruk	24	1	5	18	17	68	−51	6 (Note: Beitar Tubruk had fielded an ineligible player and had two points deducted.)	

Updated to match(es) played on 15 April 2016. Source: IFA (in Hebrew)
Rules for classification: 1st points; 2nd matches won; 3rd head-to-head; 4th deciding match

== Tel Aviv Division ==
Pos	Team	Pld	W	D	L	GF	GA	GD	Pts	Promotion
1	Shimshon Tel Aviv	26	22	3	1	102	22	+80	69	Promotion to Liga Bet
2	Maccabi HaShikma Hen	26	20	2	4	110	39	+71	62	
3	Hapoel Kiryat Shalom	26	20	1	5	72	29	+43	61	
4	Shikun Vatikim Ramat Gan	26	16	6	4	71	37	+34	54	
5	Bnei Yehud	26	17	2	7	69	42	+27	53	
6	Beitar Jaffa	26	13	5	8	74	55	+19	44	
7	Hapoel Neve Golan	26	11	3	12	83	51	+32	36	
8	Maccabi Spartak Ramat Gan	26	10	1	15	59	70	−11	31	
9	Otzma Holon	26	9	1	16	58	80	−22	28	
10	Elitzur Jaffa Tel Aviv	26	7	2	17	53	87	−34	23	
11	Elitzur Yehud	26	5	7	14	44	78	−34	22	
12	Maccabi Pardes Katz	26	7	0	19	36	126	−90	21	
13	Maccabi Ironi Or Yehuda	26	4	4	18	30	80	−50	16	
14	Beitar Ezra	26	1	3	22	25	90	−65	6	

Updated to match(es) played on 15 April 2016. Source: IFA (in Hebrew)
Rules for classification: 1st points; 2nd matches won; 3rd head-to-head; 4th deciding match

== Central Division ==
Pos	Team	Pld	W	D	L	GF	GA	GD	Pts	Promotion
1	Nordia Jerusalem	20	17	2	1	96	19	+77	53	Promotion to Liga Bet
2	Ironi Lod	20	15	1	4	61	26	+35	46	
3	Hapoel Ironi Gedera	20	14	2	4	53	15	+38	44	
4	Maccabi Kiryat Ekron	20	12	1	7	43	27	+16	37	
5	F.C. Rishon LeZion	20	8	3	9	34	47	−13	27 (Note: RLZ–TSH 5–1; TSH–RLZ 1–0)	
6	Hapoel Tirat Shalom	20	8	3	9	33	47	−14	27	
7	Hapoel Abirei Bat Yam	20	8	1	11	44	60	−16	23 (Note: Hapoel Abirei Bat Yam had two points deducted as they refused to resume their last round match against F.C. Tzeirei Lod after the break since they claimed to receive threats from their opponents.)	
8	Hapoel Mevaseret Zion	20	6	3	11	35	43	−8	21	
9	F.C. Tzeirei Lod	20	6	1	13	29	50	−21	19	
10	Hapoel Matzliah	20	5	3	12	36	53	−17	18	
11	Hapoel Ramla	20	1	0	19	26	103	−77	1 (Note: Hapoel Ramla had one point deducted over the events of the match with Hapoel F.C. Hevel Modi'in and one further point deducted as their match against Maccabi Kiryat Ekron was abandoned as their player Avi Dabush attacked the referee.)	
–	Hapoel F.C. Hevel Modi'in (Note: The fourth round match between Hapoel F.C. Hevel Modi'in and Hapoel Ramla was abandoned at the 80th minute, with Hevel Modi'in leading 7–1 due to a brawl between the two teams. As the two teams were found guilty of the match abandonment, the result was set as a 0–0 with no points awarded and a further point was deducted from each team. As a result of the decision, Hevel Modi'in alerted the IFA of their intent to withdraw immediately from the league and their results were annulled.)	0	0	0	0	0	0	0	−1	

Updated to match(es) played on 15 April 2016. Source: IFA (in Hebrew)
Rules for classification: 1st points; 2nd matches won; 3rd head-to-head; 4th deciding match

== South Division ==
Pos	Team	Pld	W	D	L	GF	GA	GD	Pts	Promotion
1	Maccabi Ashdod	28	25	2	1	120	24	+96	77	Promotion to Liga Bet
2	Maccabi Ironi Sderot	28	22	2	4	75	22	+53	68	Promotion to Liga Bet
3	A.S. Ashdod	28	21	2	5	105	25	+80	65	
4	Hapoel Bnei Ashdod	28	20	4	4	94	31	+63	64	
5	Hapoel Yeruham	28	15	8	5	67	22	+45	53	
6	F.C. Be'er Sheva Haim Levy	28	15	3	10	82	73	+9	48	
7	F.C. Arad	28	11	5	12	57	70	−13	38	
8	Elitzur Ironi Yehuda	28	9	4	15	45	77	−32	31	
9	F.C. Tzeirei al-Hoshla	28	9	2	17	50	79	−29	29 (Note: BaS–HOS 3–1; HOS–BaS 4–1)	
10	Bnei al-Salam Rahat	28	9	2	17	54	87	−33	29	
11	A.S. Ashkelon	28	6	7	15	40	59	−19	25	
12	Maccabi Ironi Hura	28	7	3	18	50	81	−31	24	
13	Ironi Kuseife	28	6	5	17	36	83	−47	23	
14	Maccabi Dimona	28	4	6	18	43	104	−61	18	
15	Hapoel Tzeirei al-Mahdi	28	2	3	23	32	113	−81	9	

Updated to match(es) played on 7 May 2016. Source: IFA (in Hebrew)
Rules for classification: 1st points; 2nd matches won; 3rd head-to-head; 4th deciding match
