= 2023–24 Israel State Cup =

Tournament details
- Country: Israel
- Dates: 1 September 2023 – 30 May 2024

Final positions
- Champions: Maccabi Petah Tikva (3rd title)
- Runners-up: Hapoel Be'er Sheva

Tournament statistics
- Matches played: 190
- Goals scored: 686 (3.61 per match)

The 2023–24 Israel State Cup (Hebrew: גביע המדינה, Gvia HaMedina) (known as the Gvia HaMedina Winner for sponsorship purposes) was the 85th season of Israel's nationwide Association football cup competition and the 69th after the Israeli Declaration of Independence. The winners qualified for the 2024–25 UEFA Europa League second qualifying round.

The Cup was suspended in October 2023 due to the Gaza war and restarted in December 2023.

Maccabi Petah Tikva won the cup (3rd title) after 72 years on 30 May 2024, defeating Hapoel Be'er Sheva 1–0 in the final.

== Preliminary rounds ==
=== Liga Bet ===
- Schedule:
- Results:

==== Liga Bet North A ====
First Round
8 September 2023
Beitar Nahariya | 3
Maccabu Bnei Jadeidi-Makr | 1
8 September 2023
Hapoel Bnei Bi'ina | 0
Ahli Tamra | 2
8 September 2023
Ahi Acre | 2
Ironi Bnei Kabul | 1
Bnei M.M.B.E. | 5
Maccabi Ahva Sha'ab | 1
8 September 2023
Maccabi Ironi Yaffa | 1
Hapoel Ironi Arraba | 2
9 September 2023
F.C. Shfar'am | 0
Maccabi Abu Snan | 2

Second Round
13 September 2023
Beitar Nahariya | 3
Ahli Tamra | 1
12 September 2023
Hapoel Karmiel | 4
Ahi Acre | 0
14 September 2023
Bnei M.M.B.E. | 4
Hapoel Ironi Arraba | 2
13 September 2023
Tzeirei Tamra | 3
Maccabi Abu Snan | 2

Third Round
18 September 2023
Beitar Nahariya | 4
Hapoel Karmiel | 2
19 September 2023
Bnei M.M.B.E. | 2
Tzeirei Tamra | 1

Fourth Round
13 February 2024
Beitar Nahariya | 4
Bnei M.M.B.E. | 0

==== Liga Bet North B ====
First Round
8 September 2023
F.C. Tirat HaCarmel | 2 (a.e.t.)
Hapoel Bnei Ar'ara 'Ara | 0
8 September 2023
Maccabi Neve Sha'anan Eldad | 3
Maccabi Achva Fureidis | 0
10 September 2023
Hapoel Beit She'an-Massilot | 3
Hapoel Sandala Gilboa | 2
8 September 2023
Hapoel Bnei Fureidis | 0
Ihud Bnei Baqa | 3
8 September 2023
Hapoel Bnei Musmus | 2
Hapeol Yaffa | 1

Second Round
13 September 2023
F.C. Tirat HaCarmel | 4
Maccabi Ahi Iksal | 0
13 September 2023
Maccabi Neve Sha'anan Eldad | 2 (a.e.t.)
Hapoel Beit She'an-Massilot | 1
13 September 2023
Ihud Bnei Baqa | 5
F.C. Bnei Qalansawe | 0
13 September 2023
Hapoel Bnei Musmus | 1 (4)
Beitar Haifa | 1 (5)

Third Round
18 September 2023
F.C. Tirat HaCarmel | 4
Maccabi Neve Sha'anan Eldad | 3
19 September 2023
Ihud Bnei Baqa | 2
Beitar Haifa | 0

Fourth Round
23 November 2023
Ihud Bnei Baqa | 0
F.C. Tirat HaCarmel | 2

==== Liga Bet South A ====
First Round
8 September 2023
Hapoel Hod HaSharon | 0
A.S. Sporting Club Tel Aviv | 4
7 September 2023
Hapoel Mahane Yehuda | 1
Beitar Ramat Gan | 0
6 September 2023
Hapoel Azor | 2
Bnei Jaffa Ortodoxim | 1
8 September 2023
Hapoel Kiryat Ono | 1
Inter Aliyah Tel Aviv | 2
8 September 2023
Beitar Petah Tikva | 0
Hakoah Maccabi Amidar Ramat Gan | 1
8 September 2023
Tzeirei Tira | 3
Hapoel Kafr Qasim Shouaa | 0
8 September 2023
Maccabi Amishav Petah Tikva | 3
Beitar Tel Aviv | 0
12 September 2023
Ironi Beit Dagan | 0
HaMakhtesh Givatayim | 2 (a.e.t.)

Second Round
14 September 2023
A.S. Sporting Club Tel Aviv | 0
Hapoel Mahane Yehuda | 3
13 September 2023
Hapoel Azor | 4
Inter Aliyah Tel Aviv | 3
14 September 2023
Hakoah Maccabi Amidar Ramat Gan | 0
Tzeirei Tira | 2
18 September 2023
Maccabi Amishav Petah Tikva | 3
HaMakhtesh Givatayim | 1

Third Round
19 September 2023
Hapoel Mahane Yehuda | 2
Hapoel Azor | 1
25 December 2023
Tzeirei Tira | 2 (2)
Maccabi Amishav Petah Tikva | 2 (4)

Fourth Round
6 February 2024
Maccabi Amishav Petah Tikva | 3
Hapoel Mahane Yehuda | 2

==== Liga Bet South B ====
First Round
8 September 2023
F.C. Jerusalem | 8 (a.e.t.)
F.C. Ramla | 6
9 September 2023
F.C. Shaqib al-Salam | 3
Beitar Ironi Kiryat Gat | 1
8 September 2023
Hapoel Gedera | 2
Maccabi Kiryat Gat | 7
13 September 2023
Beitar Yavne | 6
F.C. Shikun HaMizrah | 2
8 September 2023
F.C. Sderot | 4
Hapoel Yeruham | 0

Second Round
13 September 2023
Hapoel Bnei Ashdod | 3
F.C. Jerusalem | 1
13 September 2023
Bnei Eilat | 4
F.C. Shaqib al-Salam | 1
19 September 2023
Maccabi Kiryat Gat | 3
Beitar Yavne | 1
13 September 2023
Maccabi Ironi Netivot | 0
F.C. Sderot | 3

Third Round
19 September 2023
Hapoel Bnei Ashdod | 2
Bnei Eilat | 0
5 March 2024
Maccabi Kiryat Gat | Bye
F.C. Sderot

Fourth Round
18 March 2024
Hapoel Bnei Ashdod | 1
Maccabi Kiryat Gat | 2

=== Liga Gimel ===
Sources:

- Schedule:
- Results:

==== Liga Gimel Upper Galilee ====
First Round

Second Round
14 September 2023
Tzirei Sakhnin | 4
Hapoel Mi'ilya | 0
12 September 2023
Maccabi Sektzia Ma'alot-Tarshiha | 3
Ihud Bnei Majd al-Krum | 5

Third Round
19 September 2023
Tzirei Sakhnin | 2
Ihud Bnei Majd al-Krum | 1
19 September 2023
Hapoel Shlomi | 1
F.C. Beit Jann Rani | 3

Fourth Round
22 December 2023
Tzirei Sakhnin | 3
F.C. Beit Jann Rani | 4

==== Liga Gimel Lower Galilee ====
First Round

Second Round

Third Round
20 September 2023
Beitar Kafr Kanna Radwan | Bye
Maccbi Basmat Tab'un
19 September 2023
Maccabi Ihud Bnei Ibtin | 6
Beitar Kiryat Ata Kfir | 0

Fourth Round
23 December 2023
Beitar Kafr Kanna Radwan | 1
Maccabi Ihud Bnei Ibtin | 2

==== Liga Gimel Jezreel ====
First Round

Second Round
13 September 2023
Hapoel Ein as-Sahla | 0
Maccabi Ironi Barta'a | 3
13 September 2023
Hapoel Ramot Menashe Megiddo | 3
F.C. Pardes Hanna-Karkur | 0

Third Round
19 September 2023
Maccabi Ironi Barta'a | 1
Ihud Tzeiri Iksal | 3
19 September 2023
Hapoel Ramot Menashe Megiddo | 1
Hapoel Daliyat al-Karmel | 3

Fourth Round
24 December 2023
Ihud Tzeiri Iksal | 3
Hapoel Daliyat al-Karmel | 0

==== Liga Gimel Shomron ====
First Round
8 September 2023
F.C. Tzeirei Haifa | 6
F.C. Kiryat Haim | 0

Second Round
13 September 2023
F.C. Carmel Haifa | 3 (a.e.t.)
F.C. Kababir | 1
13 September 2023
Beitar Pardes Hanna | 2
Hapoel Ihud Bnei Jatt | 8
13 September 2023
F.C. Tzeirei Haifa | 0
F.C. Tzofi Haifa | 1
13 September 2023
Maccabi Barkai | 3
Hapoel Kiryat Haim Leibovich | 4 (a.e.t.)

Third Round
19 September 2023
F.C. Carmel Haifa | 2
Hapoel Ihud Bnei Jatt | 4
19 September 2023
F.C. Tzofi Haifa | 3
Hapoel Kiryat Haim Leibovich | 0

Fourth Round
21 December 2023
Hapoel Ihud Bnei Jatt | 0
F.C. Tzofi Haifa | 3

==== Liga Gimel Sharon ====
First Round
8 September 2023
F.C. Bnei Ra`anana | 3
F.C. Kfar Saba | 2
8 September 2023
Hapoel Pardesiya | 2
F.C. Ironi Ariel | 1
8 September 2023
Beitar Nes Tubruk | 1
Bnei Jaljulia | 3

Second Round
13 September 2023
Bnei Herzliya | 4 (a.e.t.)
F.C. Bnei Ra`anana | 3
14 September 2023
Maccabi HaSharon Netanya | 6
Hapoel Oranit | 0
13 September 2023
Hapoel Pardesiya | 0
Beitar Kfar Saba | 3
14 September 2023
Bnei Jaljulia | 3
Maccabi Kfar Yona | 1

Third Round
19 September 2023
Bnei Herzliya | 3
Maccabi HaSharon Netanya | 0
19 September 2023
Beitar Kfar Saba | 6
Bnei Jaljulia | 1

Fourth Round
21 December 2023
Bnei Herzliya | 0
Beitar Kfar Saba | 3

==== Liga Gimel Tel Aviv ====
First Round
9 September 2023
Maccabi Yehud-Monnoson | 3
F.C. Dizngoff Tel Aviv | 4
8 September 2023
Elitzur Jaffa Tel Aviv | 0
Bnei Yehud | 7
9 September 2023
Beitar Ezra | 0
Hapoel Ramat Yisrael | 1 (a.e.t.)
9 September 2023
Shikun Vatikim Ramat Gan | 2
F.C. Tel Aviv Tommy | 0
8 September 2023
Hapoel Tzafririm Holon | 1
Maccabi Giv'at Shmuel | 0
8 September 2023
Hakoah Galei Gil Ramat Gan | 2
Hapoel Neve Golan | 3
8 September 2023
Maccabi Or Yehuda | 0
Maccabi HaShikma Ramat Hen | 2
8 September 2023
Beitar Jaffa Tzion | 1
Maccabi Spartak Ramat Gan | 0

Second Round
12 September 2023
F.C. Dizngoff Tel Aviv | 2
Bnei Yehud | 0
13 September 2023
Hapoel Ramat Yisrael | 1
Shikun Vatikim Ramat Gan | 2
13 September 2023
Hapoel Tzafririm Holon | 6
Hapoel Neve Golan | 0
19 September 2023
Maccabi HaShikma Ramat Hen | 4
Beitar Jaffa Tzion | 1

Third Round
19 September 2023
F.C. Dizngoff Tel Aviv | 0
Shikun Vatikim Ramat Gan | 2
3 October 2023
Hapoel Tzafririm Holon | 3
Maccabi HaShikma Ramat Hen | 0

Fourth Round
23 December 2023
Shikun Vatikim Ramat Gan | 1
Hapoel Tzafririm Holon | 0

==== Liga Gimel Center ====
First Round
8 September 2023
Maccabi Be'er Ya'akov Amit | 2
Bnei Ramla | 0
9 September 2023
Hapeol Tirat Shalom | 3
Beitar Gan Yavne | 1
9 September 2023
Ihud Tzeiri Abu Ghosh | 3
Tzeirei Lod | 2
9 September 2023
Ironi Beit Shemesh | 6
Maccabi Bnei Abu Ghosh | 0

Second Round
13 September 2023
F.C. Be'er Ya'akov Solomon | 1
Maccabi Be'er Ya'akov Amit | 2
13 September 2023
Hapeol Tirat Shalom | 4
Hapoel Mevaseret Zion | 2
12 September 2023
F.C. Ashdod City | 6
Ihud Tzeiri Abu Ghosh | 3
13 September 2023
Ironi Beit Shemesh | 3
Beitar Gedera | 1

Third Round
19 September 2023
Maccabi Be'er Ya'akov Amit | 3
Hapeol Tirat Shalom | 2
19 September 2023
F.C. Ashdod City | 1
Ironi Beit Shemesh | 3

Fourth Round
19 December 2023
Maccabi Be'er Ya'akov Amit | 2
Ironi Beit Shemesh | 4

==== Liga Gimel South ====
First Round

Second Round
13 September 2023
F.C. Be'er Sheva | 0
Otzma Be'er Sheva | 4
13 September 2023
F.C. Maccabi Ashkelon | 7 (a.e.t.)
Maccabi Be'er Sheva | 1
14 September 2023
F.C. Be'er Sheva Haim Levy | 1
Hapoel Bnei Kuseife | 0
13 September 2023
Bnei Yerucham | 1
F.C. Meitar | 0

Third Round
10 September 2023
Otzma Be'er Sheva | 2 (a.e.t.)
F.C. Maccabi Ashkelon | 1
10 September 2023
F.C. Be'er Sheva Haim Levy | 2
Bnei Yerucham | 1

Fourth Round
23 December 2023
Otzma Be'er Sheva | 2
F.C. Be'er Sheva Haim Levy | 0

== Fifth round ==
Sources:

- Schedule:
- Results:

The fifth round was played within each division of Liga Alef, split into two regions (Liga Alef North and Liga Alef South).

| Home team | Score | Away team |
Liga Alef North
1 September 2023
| Hapoel Migdal HaEmek | 1–3 (a.e.t.) | Hapoel Ironi Baqa al-Gharbiyye |
| Ironi Nesher | 1–0 | Hapoel Kafr Kanna |
| Hapoel Kaukab | 0–2 | Maccabi Akhi Nazareth |
| F.C. Tira | 1–0 (a.e.t.) | F.C. Tzeirei Umm al-Fahm |
4 September 2023
| Hapoel Ra'anana | 2–0 | F.C. Tzeirei Tayibe |
| F.C. Kiryat Yam | 0–1 | Maccabi Ata Bialik |
| Hapoel Bnei Zalafa | Bye | F.C. Tzeirei Kafr Kanna |
| Hapoel Bu'eine | Bye | Maccabi Nujeidat |
Liga Alef South
31 August 2023
| Hapoel Kfar Shalem | 2–1 | Hapoel Bik'at HaYarden |
| Hapoel Lod | 1–2 | F.C. Dimona |
| Shimshon Tel Aviv | 2–2 (2–4 p) | Hapoel Herzliya |
1 September 2023
| Maccabi Sha'arayim | 2–3 | F.C. Holon Yermiyahu |
| Maccabi Kiryat Malakhi | 1–2 (a.e.t.) | A.S. Nordia Jerusalem |
| Maccabi Yavne | 6–0 | Shimshon Kafr Qasim |
| Hapoel Marmorek | 0–3 | Ironi Modi'in |
| A.S. Ashdod | 1–1 (2–3 p) | Maccabi Ironi Ashdod |

== Sixth round ==
| Home team | Score | Away team |
7 December 2023
| Hapoel Kfar Shalem (3) | 1–2 | Maccabi Ironi Ashdod (3) |
12 December 2023
| Hapoel Ra'anana (3) | 1–0 | F.C. Tira (3) |
25 December 2023
| Maccabi Kiryat Gat (4) | Bye | F.C. Dimona (3) |
| A.S Nordia Jerusalem (3) | 2–1 | Hapoel Bnei Ashdod (4) |
| Shikun Vatikim Ramat Gan (5) | 0–8 | F.C. Holon Yermiyahu (3) |
26 December 2023
| F.C. Tzofi Haifa (5) | 1–3 | F.C. Tirat HaCarmel (4) |
| Ironi Baqa al-Gharbiyye (3) | 4–0 | F.C. Beit Jann Rani (5) |
| Ironi Nesher (4) | 3–0 | Bnei M.M.B.E. (4) |
| Maccabi Akhi Nazareth (3) | 3–0 | Maccabi Ihud Bnei Ibtin (5) |
| Tzeirei Kafr Kanna (3) | 4–1 | Ihud Bnei Baqa (4) |
| Beitar Nahariya (4) | 1–0 (a.e.t.) | Maccabi Nujeidat (3) |
| Otzma Be'er Sheva (5) | 0–5 | Hapoel Herzliya (3) |
| Maccabi Yavne (3) | 9–1 | Ironi Beit Shemesh (5) |
| Beitar Kfar Saba (5) | 0–4 | Hapoel Mahane Yehuda (4) |
27 December 2023
| Ihud Tzeiri Iksal (5) | 0–3 | Maccabi Ata Bialik (3) |

== Seventh round ==
The 16 sixth round winners and 12 teams from the 2023–24 Liga Leumit (Bnei Yehuda Tel Aviv, Hapoel Kfar Saba, Hapoel Umm al-Fahm, and Ironi Tiberias received byes) entered the seventh round.

| Home team | Score | Away team |
9 January 2024
| Beitar Nahariya (4) | 1–6 | F.C. Dimona (3) |
| F.C. Tirat HaCarmel (4) | 0–1 | Maccabi Akhi Nazareth (3) |
| A.S Nordia Jerusalem (3) | 0–2 | Hapoel Rishon LeZion (2) |
| Hapoel Mahane Yehuda (4) | 0–5 | Hapoel Ramat Gan (2) |
| Hapoel Ra'anana (3) | 1–2 | Maccabi Jaffa (2) |
| Ironi Baqa al-Gharbiyye (3) | 0–4 | Ironi Kiryat Shmona (2) |
| Maccabi Yavne (3) | 4–0 | Ihud Bnei Shefa-'Amr (2) |
| Sektzia Ness Ziona (2) | 1–1 (4–5 p) | F.C. Kafr Qasim (2) |
| Hapoel Nof HaGalil (2) | 2–1 | Hapoel Acre (2) |
10 January 2024
| F.C. Holon Yermiyahu (3) | 0–3 | Maccabi Ironi Ashdod (3) |
| Hapoel Herzliya (3) | 4–2 | Maccabi Amishav Petah Tikva (4) |
| Hapoel Ramat HaSharon (2) | 7–0 | Hapoel Afula (2) |
| Ironi Nesher (4) | 1–3 | Maccabi Ata Bialik (3) |
| Maccabi Herzliya (2) | 0–1 | Tzeirei Kafr Kanna (3) |

== Eighth round ==
The 14 seventh round winners, the four 2023–24 Liga Leumit teams given seventh round byes, and the 14 teams from the 2023–24 Israeli Premier League entered the eighth round.

| Home team | Score | Away team |
25 January 2024
| Hapoel Ramat Gan (2) | 0–1 | Bnei Yehuda Tel Aviv (2) |
| Maccabi Akhi Nazareth (3) | 1–3 | Maccabi Jaffa (2) |
| Ironi Ashdod (3) | 1–1 (3–5 p) | Hapoel Haifa (1) |
26 January 2024
| Bnei Sakhnin (1) | 2–2 (2–4 p) | Hapoel Nir Ramat HaSharon (2) |
| F.C. Ashdod (1) | 0–2 | Ironi Tiberias (2) |
| Maccabi Netanya (1) | 2–1 | F.C. Kafr Qasim (2) |
27 January 2024
| Hapoel Jerusalem (1) | 2–0 (a.e.t.) | Hapoel Tel Aviv (1) |
| Maccabi Bnei Reineh (1) | 2–4 | Hapoel Petah Tikva (1) |
| Hapoel Be'er Sheva (1) | 1–0 | Beitar Jerusalem (1) |
| Maccabi Petah Tikva (1) | 3–1 (a.e.t.) | Maccabi Yavne (3) |
28 January 2024
| Hapoel Umm al-Fahm (2) | 2–0 | Maccabi Ata Bialik (3) |
| Hapoel Nof HaGalil (2) | 4–0 | Hapoel Herzliya (3) |
| Hapoel Rishon LeZion (2) | 1–0 | F.C. Dimona (3) |
| Hapoel Hadera (1) | 0–2 | Maccabi Tel Aviv (1) |
| Hapoel Kfar Saba (2) | 3–6 (a.e.t.) | Maccabi Haifa (1) |
9 February 2024
| Tzeirei Kafr Kanna (3) | 1–2 | Ironi Kiryat Shmona (2) |

== Round of 16 ==
The 16 eighth round winners entered the round of 16. The draw was made on 29 January 2024.

| Home team | Score | Away team |
28 February 2024
| Hapoel Be'er Sheva (1) | 1–0 | Ironi Tiberias (2) |
| Hapoel Umm al-Fahm (2) | 0–2 | Maccabi Haifa (1) |
| Maccabi Tel Aviv (1) | 3–1 | Maccabi Jaffa (2) |
29 February 2024
| Ironi Kiryat Shmona (2) | 2–1 | Hapoel Nir Ramat HaSharon (2) |
| Bnei Yehuda Tel Aviv (2) | 0–4 | Hapoel Petah Tikva (1) |
5 March 2024
| Hapoel Nof HaGalil (2) | 3–1 | Hapoel Rishon LeZion (2) |
| Maccabi Netanya (1) | 2–1 (a.e.t.) | Hapoel Jerusalem (1) |
| Hapoel Haifa (1) | 0–3 | Maccabi Petah Tikva (1) |

== Quarter-finals ==
The 8 round of 16 winners were drawn on 7 March 2024.

| Home team | Score | Away team |
2 April 2024
| Ironi Kiryat Shmona (2) | 0–2 | Hapoel Nof HaGalil (2) |
| Maccabi Petah Tikva (1) | 4–2 (a.e.t.) | Maccabi Tel Aviv (1) |
3 April 2024
| Hapoel Petah Tikva (1) | 0–1 | Hapoel Be'er Sheva (1) |
| Maccabi Haifa (1) | 1–3 | Maccabi Netanya (1) |

== Semi-finals ==
The 4 Quarter-finals winners were drawn on 5 April 2024.

| Home team | Score | Away team |
24 April 2024
| Maccabi Netanya (1) | 2–3 (a.e.t.) | Hapoel Be'er Sheva (1) |
30 April 2024
| Maccabi Petah Tikva (1) | 3–0 | Hapoel Nof HaGalil (2) |

== Final ==
| 30 May 2024 | Maccabi Petah Tikva (1) | 1–0 | Hapoel Be'er Sheva (1) | Tel Aviv |
| 20:30 | Hindy 86' (pen.) | Report | | Stadium: Bloomfield Stadium; Referee: Aviad Shiloh |
