= 2012–13 Liga Gimel =

Israeli football season

The 2012–13 Liga Gimel season saw 95 clubs competing in 6 regional divisions for promotion to Liga Bet.

Hapoel Bu'eine (Upper Galilee), Hapoel Bnei Nujeidat (Jezreel), Hapoel Yoqneam (Samaria), Shimshon Bnei Tayibe (Sharon), Hapoel Ramat Israel (Tel Aviv) and Maccabi Sderot (Central-South) all won their respective divisions and were promoted to Liga Bet.

During the summer, as several vacancies were created in Liga Bet, runners-up Maccabi Sulam (Jezreel), F.C. Tzeirei Tayibe (Sharon) and Hapoel Abirei Bat Yam (Tel Aviv) were also promoted to Liga Bet.

== Upper Galilee Division ==
Pos	Team	Pld	W	D	L	GF	GA	GD	Pts	Promotion
1	Hapoel Bu'eine	30	27	1	2	115	21	+94	82	Promoted to Liga Bet
2	Beitar Kafr Kanna	30	24	5	1	89	42	+47	77	
3	Hapoel Ironi Safed	30	20	3	7	76	28	+48	62 (Note: 1 point deducted.)	
4	Merkaz Kehilati Golan Katzrin	30	15	8	7	57	37	+20	53	
5	F.C. Hatzor HaGlilit	30	15	6	9	65	50	+15	51	
6	Ironi Bnei Sha'ab	30	13	5	12	57	57	0	43	
7	Hapoel Nahariya	30	12	5	13	45	42	+3	41	
8	Hapoel Nahf	30	11	5	14	45	40	+5	38	
9	Maccabi Bnei Deir Hanna	30	11	3	16	50	55	−5	36	
10	Hapoel Ironi Bnei I'billin	30	8	9	13	45	45	0	33	
11	F.C. Julis	30	9	5	16	44	73	−29	32	
12	Hapoel Bnei Rameh	30	9	4	17	47	74	−27	31	
13	Hapoel Bnei Jadeidi-Makr	30	9	4	17	43	82	−39	31	
14	F.C. Sallama Misgav	30	7	5	18	46	75	−29	26	
15	Hapoel Bnei Bi'ina	30	7	4	19	38	84	−46	25	
16	Hapoel Bnei Peki'in	30	5	4	21	38	95	−57	19	

== Jezreel Division ==
Pos	Team	Pld	W	D	L	GF	GA	GD	Pts	Promotion
1	Hapoel Bnei Nujeidat	30	28	1	1	107	28	+79	85	Promoted to Liga Bet
2	Maccabi Sulam	30	24	4	2	124	30	+94	76	Promoted to Liga Bet
3	F.C. Nazareth Illit Hanan Ohayon	30	22	3	5	81	34	+47	69	
4	Ahi Bir al-Maksur	30	18	6	6	80	38	+42	60	
5	Maccabi Ironi Yafa	30	17	7	6	81	34	+47	58	
6	Hapoel Sandala Gilboa	30	16	6	8	71	51	+20	54	
7	Hapoel Bnei Zalafa	30	15	3	12	58	52	+6	48	
8	Al-Nahda Nazareth	30	15	2	13	56	52	+4	47	
9	Beitar Afula	30	12	2	16	58	59	−1	38	
10	Maccabi Isfiya	30	11	2	17	69	64	+5	35	
11	Hapoel Zarzir	30	8	3	19	45	89	−44	27	
12	Beitar el-Amal Nazareth	30	7	5	18	60	96	−36	26	
13	Hapoel al-Ittihad Nazareth	30	7	2	21	54	91	−37	21 (Note: 2 points deducted.)	
14	Hapoel Ka'abiyye	30	5	3	22	57	110	−53	18	
15	Hapoel Bnei Nazareth	30	4	2	24	36	131	−95	14	
16	Hapoel Hajajre	30	4	3	23	55	133	−78	12 (Note: 3 points deducted.)	

== Samaria Division ==
Pos	Team	Pld	W	D	L	GF	GA	GD	Pts	Promotion
1	Hapoel Yoqneam	28	24	1	3	108	25	+83	73	Promoted to Liga Bet
2	Hapoel Ihud Bnei Jatt	28	22	3	3	75	16	+59	69	
3	F.C. Pardes Hanna-Karkur	28	22	2	4	104	20	+84	68	
4	Maccabi Ironi Tirat HaCarmel	28	20	1	7	78	38	+40	61	
5	Beitar Pardes Hanna	28	14	4	10	51	47	+4	46	
6	Hapoel Spartak Haifa	28	13	2	13	52	49	+3	41	
7	Maccabi Ironi Barta'a	28	12	2	14	58	66	−8	38	
8	Hapoel Kafr Qara	28	11	3	14	51	48	+3	36	
9	Bnei Umm al-Fahm	28	10	3	15	35	44	−9	33	
10	Beitar Hadera	28	9	6	13	49	56	−7	33	
11	Hapoel Muawiya	28	10	3	15	34	54	−20	33	
12	Hapoel Bnei Fureidis	28	9	2	17	38	60	−22	29	
13	Maccabi Neve Sha'anan Eldad	28	7	3	18	32	67	−35	24	
14	Hapoel Bnei Zemer	28	4	1	23	29	120	−91	13	
15	Maccabi Or Akiva	28	4	2	22	35	119	−84	12 (Note: 2 points deducted.)	

Notes:

During the season, Beitar Umm al-Fahm (after 15 matches) folded and its results were annulled.

== Sharon Division ==
Pos	Team	Pld	W	D	L	GF	GA	GD	Pts	Promotion
1	Shimshon Bnei Tayibe	30	29	1	0	154	19	+135	88	Promoted to Liga Bet
2	F.C. Tzeirei Tayibe	30	27	2	1	115	16	+99	83	Promoted to Liga Bet
3	Hapoel Kafr Qasim Shouaa	30	25	1	4	116	29	+87	76	
4	F.C. Bnei Ra'anana	30	16	6	8	107	63	+44	54	
5	Hapoel Tzeirei Qalansawe	30	15	3	12	66	54	+12	48	
6	Hapoel Pardesiya	30	14	4	12	81	68	+13	46	
7	F.C. Bnei Qalansawe	30	14	5	11	73	66	+7	45 (Note: 2 points deducted.)	
8	F.C. Rosh HaAyin	30	14	3	13	74	77	−3	45	
9	Beitar Oranit	30	8	5	17	36	68	−32	29	
10	Hapoel Kafr Bara	30	8	4	18	52	98	−46	28	
11	Hapoel Jaljulia	30	8	3	19	44	73	−29	27	
12	Beitar Ironi Ariel	30	8	3	19	46	86	−40	27	
13	F.C. Netanya	30	7	6	17	33	84	−51	27	
14	Shimshon Kafr Qasim	30	7	3	20	32	96	−64	24	
15	F.C. Kafr Qasim Nibrass	30	6	5	19	41	100	−59	23	
16	Beitar Tubruk	30	5	4	21	41	113	−72	19	

Notes:

F.C. Tzeirei Tayibe competed with Hapoel Abirei Bat Yam from the Tel Aviv division for a vacant spot in Liga Bet, and lost the match 0–1. After the match another spot became available in Liga Bet, and F.C. Tzeirei Tayibe was promoted as well.

== Tel Aviv Division ==
Pos	Team	Pld	W	D	L	GF	GA	GD	Pts	Promotion
1	Hapoel Ramat Israel	30	26	1	3	117	37	+80	79 (Note: As Hapoel Ramat Israel and Hapoel Abirei Bat Yam finished level on points, a deciding match was played between the two teams, in which Hapoel Ramat Israel won 1–0 (a.e.t.) and was promoted to 2013–14 Liga Bet. Later, Hapoel Abirei Bat Yam was also promoted to Liga Bet, after winning a qualification match against F.C. Tzeirei Tayibe from the Sharon division.)	Promoted to Liga Bet
2	Hapoel Abirei Bat Yam	30	26	1	3	142	31	+111	79	Promoted to Liga Bet
3	Ironi Beit Dagan	30	21	4	5	87	43	+44	67	
4	A.S. Holon	30	20	2	8	102	52	+50	62	
5	Hapoel F.C. Givat Shmuel	30	21	3	6	84	38	+46	60 (Note: 6 points deducted)	
6	Hapoel Kiryat Shalom	30	14	4	12	67	52	+15	46	
7	Hapoel Neve Golan	30	12	5	13	74	87	−13	41	
8	Beitar Jaffa	30	12	4	14	50	56	−6	40	
9	F.C. Mahanaim Ramat Gan	30	11	4	15	47	66	−19	37	
10	Maccabi Ironi Or Yehuda	30	11	3	16	57	78	−21	36	
11	F.C. Roei Heshbon Tel Aviv	30	10	5	15	70	65	+5	35	
12	Elitzur Jaffa Tel Aviv	30	9	5	16	67	103	−36	32	
13	Maccabi Pardes Katz	30	6	4	20	60	128	−68	22	
14	Elitzur Yehud	30	6	3	21	35	96	−61	21	
15	Brit Sport Ma'of	30	4	3	23	59	134	−75	15	
16	Beitar Ezra	30	3	5	22	44	96	−52	14	

== Central-South Division ==
Pos	Team	Pld	W	D	L	GF	GA	GD	Pts	Promotion
1	Maccabi Sderot	28	23	2	3	71	24	+47	71	Promoted to Liga Bet
2	F.C. Ashkelon	28	21	4	3	104	24	+80	67	
3	Maccabi Segev Shalom	28	20	3	5	105	31	+74	63	
4	Maccabi Rehovot	28	18	6	4	66	32	+34	60	
5	Hapoel Tel Sheva	28	17	5	6	74	38	+36	56	
6	F.C. Hapoel Yeruham	28	12	8	8	73	41	+32	44	
7	Bnei al-Salam	28	14	4	10	60	54	+6	44 (Note: 2 points deducted.)	
8	Hapoel F.C. Hevel Modi'in	28	10	5	13	59	53	+6	32 (Note: 3 points deducted.)	
9	Hapoel Mevaseret Zion	28	7	8	13	50	62	−12	28 (Note: 1 point deducted.)	
10	Hapoel Ironi Gedera	28	7	5	16	50	65	−15	26	
11	F.C. Tzeirei al-Hoshla	28	8	0	20	44	130	−86	24	
12	F.C. Rishon LeZion	28	6	3	19	40	88	−48	21	
13	Hapoel Tzeirei al-Mahdi	28	4	7	17	29	80	−51	19	
14	Hapoel Tirat Shalom	28	5	3	20	50	93	−43	18	
15	F.C. Arad	28	6	1	21	37	97	−60	18	
