= 2011–12 Liga Gimel =

Israeli football season

The 2011–12 Liga Gimel season saw 95 clubs competing in 6 regional divisions for promotion to Liga Bet.

Bnei Maghar (Upper Galilee), F.C. Tzeirei Tur'an (Jezreel), Hapoel Umm al-Fahm (Samaria), Hapoel Morasha Ramat HaSharon (Sharon), Otzma F.C. Holon (Tel Aviv) and Ironi Modi'in (Central) all won their respective divisions and were promoted to Liga Bet.

During the summer, as several vacancies were created in Liga Bet, runners-up Beitar Petah Tikva (Sharon), Bnei Yehud (Tel Aviv) and Beitar Givat Ze'ev (Central) were also promoted to Liga Bet.

== Upper Galilee Division ==
Pos	Team	Pld	W	D	L	GF	GA	GD	Pts	Promotion
1	Bnei Maghar	28	26	1	1	105	13	+92	79	Promoted to Liga Bet
2	Hapoel Bu'eine	28	24	4	0	103	17	+86	76	
3	Hapoel Nahf	28	20	4	4	76	30	+46	64	
4	Hapoel Ironi Bnei I'billin	28	15	2	11	51	41	+10	47	
5	Beitar Kafr Kanna	28	15	2	11	76	69	+7	47	
6	Maccabi Bnei Deir Hanna	28	13	6	9	55	34	+21	45	
7	Hapoel Nahariya	28	13	2	13	65	62	+3	41	
8	Hapoel Ironi Safed	28	13	6	9	68	49	+19	40 (Note: 5 points deducted.)	
9	Ironi Bnei Sha'ab	28	14	0	14	58	58	0	40 (Note: 2 points deducted.)	
10	F.C. Hatzor HaGlilit	28	8	4	16	36	57	−21	28	
11	Hapoel Jatt Yanuh HaGlilit	28	9	3	16	38	60	−22	26 (Note: 4 points deducted.)	
12	Hapoel Bnei Rameh	28	8	2	18	58	97	−39	26	
13	Hapoel Bnei Peki'in	28	5	4	19	31	70	−39	19	
14	Hapoel Bnei Bi'ina	28	4	5	19	48	93	−45	14 (Note: 3 points deducted.)	
15	F.C. Julis	28	0	1	27	24	142	−118	1	

== Jezreel Division ==
Pos	Team	Pld	W	D	L	GF	GA	GD	Pts	Promotion
1	Hapoel Bnei Nujeidat	26	23	2	1	95	14	+81	71 (Note: As Hapoel Bnei Nujeidat and F.C. Tzeirei Tur'an finished level on points, a deciding match was played between the two teams, in which Tzeirei Tur'an won 7–6 on penalties, and was promoted to 2012–13 Liga Bet.)	
2	F.C. Tzeirei Tur'an	26	23	2	1	81	19	+62	71	Promoted to Liga Bet
3	Maccabi Sulam	26	15	7	4	60	24	+36	52	
4	Hapoel Bnei Zalafa	26	13	5	8	44	28	+16	44	
5	Beitar Afula	26	13	4	9	59	47	+12	43	
6	Maccabi Har HaCarmel	26	13	4	9	57	48	+9	43	
7	Hapoel Sandala Gilboa	26	12	4	10	48	44	+4	40	
8	Ahi Bir al-Maksur	26	11	5	10	38	37	+1	38	
9	Maccabi Ironi Yafa	26	9	6	11	52	51	+1	33	
10	Hapoel al-Ittihad Nazareth	26	8	3	15	38	52	−14	27	
11	Hapoel Bnei Nazareth	26	7	3	16	43	90	−47	24	
12	Hapoel Manshiya Zabda	26	6	1	19	43	79	−36	19	
13	Beitar el-Amal Nazareth	26	4	0	22	37	80	−43	12	
14	Hapoel Bnei Hajajra	26	1	2	23	27	109	−82	5	

Notes:

During the season, Hapoel Tzeirei Basmat Tab'un (after 11 matches) and Hapoel Ka'abiyye (after 12 matches) folded and their results were annulled.

== Samaria Division ==
Pos	Team	Pld	W	D	L	GF	GA	GD	Pts	Promotion
1	Hapoel Umm al-Fahm	22	18	3	1	61	19	+42	57	Promoted to Liga Bet
2	F.C. Pardes Hanna-Karkur	22	17	2	3	61	23	+38	53	
3	Hapoel Ihud Bnei Jatt	22	9	7	6	48	35	+13	34	
4	Hapoel Yokneam	22	11	2	9	46	60	−14	32 (Note: 3 points deducted.)	
5	Maccabi Neve Sha'anan Eldad	22	8	6	8	33	24	+9	30	
6	Hapoel Bnei Fureidis	22	9	3	10	38	38	0	30	
7	Hapoel Spartak Haifa	22	8	6	8	35	40	−5	30	
8	Bnei Umm al-Fahm	22	8	5	9	26	33	−7	29	
9	Beitar Pardes Hanna	22	6	7	9	50	51	−1	25	
10	Beitar Umm al-Fahm	22	6	3	13	26	44	−18	21	
11	Hapoel Kafr Qara	22	5	6	11	33	46	−13	21	
12	Beitar Hadera	22	1	2	19	20	64	−44	5	

Notes:

During the season, Hapoel Bnei Zemer (after 3 matches), Hapoel Ironi Arara (after 18 matches), Maccabi Barkai (after 22 matches) and Hapoel Muawiya (after 26 matches) folded and their results were annulled.

== Sharon Division ==
Pos	Team	Pld	W	D	L	GF	GA	GD	Pts	Promotion
1	Hapoel Morasha Ramat HaSharon	30	27	3	0	155	27	+128	84	Promoted to Liga Bet
2	Beitar Petah Tikva	30	21	4	5	112	36	+76	67	Promoted to Liga Bet
3	Hapoel Jaljulia	30	20	2	8	78	35	+43	62	
4	F.C. Bnei Ra'anana	30	17	4	9	75	50	+25	55	
5	F.C. Tzeirei Tayibe	30	17	3	10	71	44	+27	54	
6	Hapoel Oranit	30	15	6	9	63	41	+22	51	
7	F.C. Bnei Qalansawe	30	14	8	8	78	46	+32	50	
8	Hapoel Aliyah Kfar Saba	30	15	4	11	54	53	+1	49	
9	Beitar Oranit	30	13	4	13	56	81	−25	43	
10	Beitar Ironi Ariel	30	12	6	12	59	51	+8	42	
11	Hapoel Kafr Qasim Shouaa	30	12	5	13	49	52	−3	40 (Note: 1 point deducted.)	
12	Hapoel Kafr Bara	30	10	3	17	54	80	−26	30 (Note: 3 points deducted.)	
13	Shimshon Kafr Qasim	30	6	4	20	46	87	−41	22	
14	Beitar Tubruk	30	4	5	21	42	115	−73	17	
15	Hapoel Tzeirei Qalansawe	30	3	5	22	32	96	−64	14	
16	F.C. Kafr Qasim Nibrass	30	0	2	28	19	149	−130	2	

== Tel Aviv Division ==
Pos	Team	Pld	W	D	L	GF	GA	GD	Pts	Promotion
1	Otzma Holon	30	24	4	2	133	27	+106	76	Promoted to Liga Bet
2	Bnei Yehud	30	22	3	5	113	41	+72	69	Promoted to Liga Bet
3	Hapoel F.C. Givat Shmuel	30	20	7	3	84	27	+57	67	
4	Hapoel Ramat Israel	30	18	8	4	143	58	+85	62	
5	F.C. Mahanaim Ramat Gan	30	16	4	10	66	55	+11	52	
6	F.C. Roei Heshbon Tel Aviv	30	15	5	10	90	65	+25	50	
7	Hapoel Kiryat Shalom	30	16	1	13	72	57	+15	49	
8	Ironi Beit Dagan	30	13	7	10	76	70	+6	46	
9	A.S. Holon	30	14	3	13	72	71	+1	45	
10	Maccabi Ironi Or Yehuda	30	12	2	16	56	73	−17	38	
11	Elitzur Yehud	30	10	4	16	62	92	−30	34	
12	Beitar Jaffa	30	9	5	16	55	70	−15	32	
13	Beitar Ezra	30	8	0	22	54	107	−53	24	
14	Elitzur Jaffa Tel Aviv	30	6	3	21	54	111	−57	21	
15	Hapoel Neve Golan	30	4	5	21	63	121	−58	17	
16	Brit Sport Ma'of	30	2	1	27	33	181	−148	7	

== Central Division ==
Pos	Team	Pld	W	D	L	GF	GA	GD	Pts	Promotion
1	Ironi Modi'in	28	26	1	1	147	11	+136	79	Promoted to Liga Bet
2	Beitar Givat Ze'ev	28	24	3	1	137	25	+112	75	Promoted to Liga Bet
3	Ironi Beit Shemesh	28	18	4	6	108	46	+62	58	Promoted to Liga Bet
4	Hapoel Ofakim	28	17	2	9	71	41	+30	53	
5	Maccabi Yeruham	28	16	3	9	71	41	+30	51	
6	Hapoel Tel Sheva	28	16	3	9	79	45	+34	49 (Note: 2 points deducted.)	
7	Bnei al-Salam	28	14	3	11	73	49	+24	45	
8	Hapoel Ironi Gedera	28	13	4	11	49	43	+6	43	
9	Maccabi Rehovot	28	13	2	13	47	50	−3	39	
10	F.C. Rishon LeZion	28	9	2	17	45	83	−38	29	
11	Hapoel F.C. Hevel Modi'in	28	9	0	19	63	85	−22	27	
12	F.C. Tzeirei al-Hoshla	28	8	2	18	72	110	−38	26	
13	Hapoel Tzeirei al-Mahdi	28	3	5	20	28	86	−58	14	
14	Hapoel Tirat Shalom	28	4	2	22	41	110	−69	11 (Note: 3 points deducted.)	
15	Hapoel Ramla	28	2	0	26	21	227	−206	5 (Note: 1 point deducted.)	

Notes:

During the season, Hapoel Matzliah (after 25 matches) folded and its results were annulled.
