= 2020–21 Liga Gimel =

Liga Gimel
- Season: 2020–21

The 2020–21 Liga Gimel season is the 53rd season of fifth-tier football in Israel.

== Format change ==
To accommodate the shortened schedule caused by COVID-19 pandemic, Divisions with more than 12 teams (Sharon, Tel Aviv, Central and South division) were divided into two sub-divisions. After completion of the league schedule the two top teams from each sub-division would qualify to a promotion group of four teams, with the winning team gaining promotion to Liga Bet and the second-placed team qualify to the promotion play-offs. The bottom clubs played another round of matches between themselves.

== Upper Galilee (North A) Division ==
Pos	Team	Pld	W	D	L	GF	GA	GD	Pts	Qualification or relegation
1	Maccabi Bnei Jadeidi Makr	18	16	2	0	77	6	+71	50	Promotion to Liga Bet
2	Hapoel Ihud Bnei Sumei	18	16	1	1	81	11	+70	49	Promotion play-offs
3	Hapoel Bnei Bi'ina	18	14	1	3	61	20	+41	43	
4	Maccabi Bnei Abu Snan	18	10	1	7	49	23	+26	31	
5	Hapoel Nahf	18	9	2	7	42	25	+17	28 (Note: The result of the 12th round match between Bnei Deir Hanna and Hapoel Nahf was set to 0–0 with no points awarded due to infringements from both teams. Deir Hanna players attacked the referee and caused the match to be abandoned and Hapoel Nahf fielded an ineligible player.)	
6	Hapoel Tarshiha	18	8	0	10	33	44	−11	24	
7	Hapoel Shlomi	18	6	0	12	19	63	−44	18	
8	Bnei Deir Hanna	18	4	1	13	36	82	−46	12	
9	Hapoel Nahariya	18	1	1	16	17	88	−71	4	
10	Abirei HaTzafon Kafr Sumei	18	1	1	16	12	65	−53	4	

Source: Liga Gimel Upper Galilee IFA (in Hebrew)
Rules for classification: 1) points; 2) number of wins; 3) head to head; 4) deciding match.

== Lower Galilee (North B) Division ==
Pos	Team	Pld	W	D	L	GF	GA	GD	Pts	Qualification or relegation
1	Hapoel Deir Hanna	18	14	2	2	44	9	+35	43 (Note: The fourth round match between Hapoel Deir Hanna and Bnei Deir al-Asad was abandoned at the 85th minute as players attacked the referee, his assistant and each other. The result of the match was set to 0–0 without points awarded.)	Promotion to Liga Bet
2	Ironi Bnei Sha'ab	18	13	2	3	52	16	+36	41	Promotion play-offs
3	Maccabi Basmat Tab'un	18	13	1	4	43	12	+31	40	
4	Beitar Kafr Kanna	18	9	3	6	44	34	+10	30 (Note: Beitar Kafr Kana wins over Al-Ahly Tamra in head-to-head (on away goals) (0–0; 2–2).)	
5	Al-Ahly Tamra	18	9	3	6	38	26	+12	30	
6	F.C. Kafr Yasif	18	8	3	7	39	30	+9	27	
7	F.C. Shefa-'Amr	18	7	4	7	36	38	−2	25	
8	Hapoel Bnei Deir al-Asad	18	4	3	11	32	62	−30	14	
9	F.C. Sallama Misgav	18	2	1	15	19	62	−43	7	
10	F.C. Bu'eine Nujeidat	18	0	0	18	14	72	−58	0	

Source: Liga Gimel Lower Galilee IFA (in Hebrew)
Rules for classification: 1) points; 2) number of wins; 3) head to head; 4) deciding match.

== Jezreel (North C) Division ==
Pos	Team	Pld	W	D	L	GF	GA	GD	Pts	Qualification or relegation
1	Hapoel Daliyat al-Karmel	18	15	1	2	74	14	+60	46	Promotion to Liga Bet
2	Tzeirei Umm al-Fahm	18	14	3	1	80	14	+66	45	Promotion play-offs
3	Hapoel Yafa	18	14	2	2	45	14	+31	44	
4	Hapoel Tzeirei Nazareth	18	12	2	4	60	24	+36	38	
5	Ihud Tzeirei Iksal	18	6	1	11	36	59	−23	19 (Note: Tzeirei Iksal wins over Hapoel Al-Batuf in head-to-head (1–3; 5–2).)	
6	Hapoel Al-Batuf	18	6	1	11	25	48	−23	19	
7	Maccabi Barta'a	18	6	0	12	33	52	−19	18	
8	Bnei Umm al-Fahm	18	5	1	12	23	68	−45	16	
9	Maccabi Ahva Fureidis	18	3	1	14	23	64	−41	10	
10	Beitar Umm al-Fahm	18	2	2	14	18	60	−42	8	

Source: Liga Gimel Jezreel IFA (in Hebrew)
Rules for classification: 1) points; 2) number of wins; 3) head to head; 4) deciding match.

== Samaria (North D) Division ==
Pos	Team	Pld	W	D	L	GF	GA	GD	Pts	Qualification or relegation
1	Maccabi Isfiya	22	21	1	0	107	7	+100	64	Promotion to Liga Bet
2	Hapoel Kiryat Yam	22	14	4	4	71	24	+47	46	Promotion play-offs
3	Tzeirei Haifa	22	13	3	6	83	38	+45	42	
4	Hapoel Kiryat Haim	22	12	4	6	73	39	+34	40	
5	F.C. Or Akiva	22	12	2	8	45	43	+2	38	
6	Maccabi Kiryat Yam	22	10	5	7	61	37	+24	35	
7	Hapoel Bnei Jisr az-Zarqa	22	8	4	10	49	58	−9	28	
8	Carmel Haifa	22	8	0	14	61	76	−15	24	
9	Beitar Pardes Hanna	22	7	2	13	49	87	−38	23 (Note: Beitar Pardes Hanna wins over Maccabi Barkai in head-to-head (on away goals) (2–0; 2–4).)	
10	Maccabi Barkai	22	7	2	13	52	69	−17	23	
11	Hapoel Yokneam	22	4	2	16	32	69	−37	14	
12	Beitar Kiryat Ata	22	1	1	20	25	161	−136	4	

Source: Liga Gimel Samaria IFA (in Hebrew)
Rules for classification: 1) points; 2) number of wins; 3) head to head; 4) deciding match.

== Sharon (South A) Division ==
=== Sub-division A ===
Pos	Team	Pld	W	D	L	GF	GA	GD	Pts	Qualification or relegation
1	Bnei Ra'anana	12	10	0	2	54	17	+37	30	Promotion group
2	Bnei Herzliya	12	7	4	1	35	19	+16	25	Promotion group
3	Hapoel Oranit	16	9	4	3	32	19	+13	31	
4	Hakoah Galei Gil Ramat Gan	16	7	0	9	33	50	−17	21	
5	Maccabi Giv'at Shmuel	16	5	5	6	31	34	−3	20	
6	Beitar Mateh Binyamin	16	4	3	9	42	47	−5	15	
7	F.C. Kafr Qasim Nibrass	16	1	2	13	24	65	−41	5	

Source: Liga Gimel Sharon IFA (in Hebrew)
Rules for classification: 1) points; 2) number of wins; 3) head to head; 4) deciding match.

=== Sub-division B ===
Pos	Team	Pld	W	D	L	GF	GA	GD	Pts	Qualification or relegation
1	Tzeirei Tira	14	10	0	4	47	14	+33	30	Promotion group
2	Bnei Qalansawe	14	9	3	2	43	19	+24	30	Promotion group
3	Ironi Ariel	19	10	3	6	41	31	+10	33	
4	Bnei Tira	19	10	2	7	44	42	+2	32	
5	Maccabi HaSharon Netanya	19	9	1	9	34	37	−3	28	
6	Maccabi Ironi Kfar Yona	19	8	3	8	44	35	+9	27	
7	F.C. Netanya	19	4	2	13	25	63	−38	14	
8	Beitar Tubruk	19	2	4	13	15	52	−37	10	

Source: Liga Gimel Sharon IFA (in Hebrew)
Rules for classification: 1) points; 2) number of wins; 3) head to head; 4) deciding match.

=== Promotion group ===
Pos	Team	Pld	W	D	L	GF	GA	GD	Pts	Qualification or relegation
1	Tzeirei Tira	6	5	0	1	10	4	+6	15	Promotion to Liga Leumit
2	Bnei Herzliya	6	3	1	2	11	11	0	10	Promotion play-offs
3	Bnei Qalansawe	6	2	0	4	16	17	−1	6	
4	Bnei Ra'anana	6	1	1	4	8	13	−5	4	

Source: Liga Gimel Sharon IFA (in Hebrew)
Rules for classification: 1) points; 2) goal difference; 3) number of wins; 4) goals scored; 5) head to head; 6) deciding match.

== Tel Aviv (South B) Division ==
=== Sub-division A ===
Pos	Team	Pld	W	D	L	GF	GA	GD	Pts	Qualification or relegation
1	HaMakhtesh Givatayim	12	10	0	2	77	16	+61	30	Promotion group
2	Maccabi HaShikma Hen	12	9	1	2	53	18	+35	28	Promotion group
3	Hapoel Neve Golan	16	10	3	3	85	35	+50	33	
4	Inter Aliyah Tel Aviv	16	10	1	5	73	20	+53	31	
5	Elitzur Yehud	16	5	3	8	64	62	+2	18	
6	Beitar Jaffa	16	2	3	11	25	62	−37	9	
7	Maccabi Pardes Katz	16	0	1	15	14	178	−164	1	

Source: Liga Gimel Tel Aviv IFA (in Hebrew)

=== Sub-division B ===
Pos	Team	Pld	W	D	L	GF	GA	GD	Pts	Qualification or relegation
1	Hapoel Ramat Israel	14	13	1	0	64	14	+50	40	Promotion group
2	Shikun Vatikim Ramat Gan	14	11	0	3	51	19	+32	33	Promotion group
3	Bnei Yehud	19	9	4	6	41	24	+17	31	
4	Maccabi Spartak Ramat Gan	19	8	1	10	44	58	−14	25	
5	AS Holon	19	6	5	8	38	56	−18	23	
6	Beitar Ezra	19	6	1	12	31	52	−21	19	
7	Elitzur Jaffa Tel Aviv	19	5	5	9	42	56	−14	20	
8	Maccabi Or Yehuda	19	3	3	13	30	62	−32	12	

Source: Liga Gimel Tel Aviv IFA (in Hebrew)
Rules for classification: 1) points; 2) number of wins; 3) head to head; 4) deciding match.

=== Promotion group ===
Pos	Team	Pld	W	D	L	GF	GA	GD	Pts	Qualification or relegation
1	Hapoel Ramat Israel	6	3	2	1	15	8	+7	11	Promotion to Liga Leumit
2	HaMakhtesh Givatayim	6	3	1	2	15	10	+5	10	Promotion play-offs
3	Shikun Vatikim Ramat Gan	6	2	2	2	10	14	−4	8	
4	Maccabi HaShikma Hen	6	1	1	4	10	18	−8	4	

Source: Liga Gimel Tel Aviv IFA (in Hebrew)
Rules for classification: 1) points; 2) goal difference; 3) number of wins; 4) goals scored; 5) head to head; 6) deciding match.

== Central (South C) Division ==
=== Sub-division A ===
Pos	Team	Pld	W	D	L	GF	GA	GD	Pts	Qualification or relegation
1	F.C. Ramla	12	12	0	0	60	7	+53	36	Promotion group
2	Beitar Givat Ze'ev	12	8	1	3	36	17	+19	25	Promotion group
3	Maccabi Ramla	16	6	5	5	34	32	+2	23	
4	Tzeirei Lod	16	6	2	8	27	59	−32	20	
5	Ashdod City	16	6	1	9	44	47	−3	19	
6	Hapoel Mevaseret Zion	16	5	3	8	27	32	−5	18	
7	Hapoel Matzliah	16	2	2	12	18	52	−34	6 (Note: Hapoel Matzliah had two points deducted.)	

Source: Liga Gimel Central IFA (in Hebrew)
Rules for classification: 1) points; 2) number of wins; 3) head to head; 4) deciding match.

==== Sub-division B ====
Pos	Team	Pld	W	D	L	GF	GA	GD	Pts	Qualification or relegation
1	Hapoel Nahlat Yehuda	14	11	2	1	45	10	+35	35	Promotion group
2	Bnei Yeechalal Rehovot	14	11	1	2	39	7	+32	34	Promotion group
3	Hapoel Bnei Ashdod	19	12	3	4	74	29	+45	39	
4	Beitar Gan Yavne	19	11	1	7	51	34	+17	34	
5	F.C. Rishon LeZion	19	7	3	9	65	57	+8	24	
6	Hapoel Brenner	19	6	3	10	47	59	−12	21	
7	Hapoel Tirat Shalom	19	4	1	14	22	90	−68	13	
8	Hapoel Ramla	19	1	2	16	25	82	−57	5	

Source: Liga Gimel Central IFA (in Hebrew)
Rules for classification: 1) points; 2) number of wins; 3) head to head; 4) deciding match.

=== Promotion group ===
Pos	Team	Pld	W	D	L	GF	GA	GD	Pts	Qualification or relegation
1	F.C. Ramla	6	5	1	0	20	2	+18	16	Promotion to Liga Leumit
2	Bnei Yeechalal Rehovot	6	4	1	1	17	8	+9	13	Promotion play-offs
3	Beitar Givat Ze'ev	6	1	1	4	7	18	−11	4	
4	Hapoel Nahlat Yehuda	6	0	1	5	4	20	−16	1	

Source: Liga Gimel Central IFA (in Hebrew)
Rules for classification: 1) points; 2) goal difference; 3) number of wins; 4) goals scored; 5) head to head; 6) deciding match.

== South (South D) Division ==
=== Sub-division A ===
Pos	Team	Pld	W	D	L	GF	GA	GD	Pts	Qualification or relegation
1	Maccabi Be'er Sheva	14	13	1	0	62	18	+44	40	Promotion group
2	Hapoel Segev Shalom	14	12	0	2	57	15	+42	36	Promotion group
3	Maccabi Ironi Hura	19	12	3	4	57	35	+22	37 (Note: Two matches of Maccabi Hura, against Maccabi Yerucham and Tzeirei al-Hoshla, were given as 0–0 without points given.)	
4	Otzma Be'er Sheva	19	10	0	9	62	54	+8	30	
5	Bnei Yerucham	19	8	1	10	31	36	−5	25	
6	Maccabi Dimona	19	4	1	14	33	74	−41	13 (Note: Maccabi Dimona wins over Maccabi Yerucham in head-to-head (3–2, 2–1, 0–3).)	
7	Maccabi Yerucham	19	4	2	13	22	56	−34	13	
8	Tzeirei al-Hoshla	19	3	2	14	32	68	−36	10	

Source: Liga Gimel South IFA (in Hebrew)
Rules for classification: 1) points; 2) number of wins; 3) head to head; 4) deciding match.

=== Sub-division B ===
Pos	Team	Pld	W	D	L	GF	GA	GD	Pts	Qualification or relegation
1	Maccabi Kiryat Gat	14	12	2	0	48	9	+39	38	Promotion group
2	Hapoel Sderot	14	11	1	2	39	11	+28	34	Promotion group
3	Ironi Beit Shemesh	19	13	3	3	53	26	+27	42	
4	F.C. Be'er Sheva Haim Levy	19	9	5	5	51	33	+18	32	
5	Maccabi Ashkelon	19	5	1	13	47	67	−20	16	
6	Hapoel Rahat	19	4	5	10	25	60	−35	17	
7	Hapoel Bnei Kuseife	19	3	3	13	40	67	−27	12	
8	Hapoel Mateh Yehuda	19	2	4	13	25	55	−30	10	

Source: Liga Gimel South IFA (in Hebrew)
Rules for classification: 1) points; 2) number of wins; 3) head to head; 4) deciding match.

=== Promotion group ===
Pos	Team	Pld	W	D	L	GF	GA	GD	Pts	Qualification or relegation
1	Hapoel Segev Shalom	6	4	1	1	19	13	+6	13 (Note: Hapoel Segev Shalom wins over Maccabi Be'er Sheva in head-to-head (3–3, 5–3).)	Promotion to Liga Leumit
2	Maccabi Be'er Sheva	6	4	1	1	17	11	+6	13	Promotion play-offs
3	Maccabi Kiryat Gat	6	2	0	4	9	18	−9	6	
4	Hapoel Sderot	6	1	0	5	12	15	−3	3	

Source: Liga Gimel South IFA (in Hebrew)
Rules for classification: 1) points; 2) goal difference; 3) number of wins; 4) goals scored; 5) head to head; 6) deciding match.

== Promotion play-offs ==
The promotion play-offs were played in two rounds. In the first the two runners-up from each pair of divisions (Upper Galilee and Lower Galilee, Jezreel and Samaria, Sharon and Tel Aviv and Central and South) played each other, with the winner advancing to meet the losing team of the Liga Bet relegation play-offs.

Promotion to Liga Bet North A Division

Relegation Playoffs			Test Match
			Bet	Sektzia Ma'a lot	0 (4)
UG2	Hapoel Ihud Bnei Sumei	0	LG2	Ironi Bnei Sha'ab	0 (5)
LG2	Ironi Bnei Sha'ab	1

Promotion to Liga Bet South A Division

Relegation Playoffs			Test Match
			Bet	Hapoel Pardesiya	2
Sha2	Bnei Herzliya	1	TA2	HaMakhtesh Givatayim	1
TA2	HaMakhtesh Givatayim	5

Promotion to Liga Bet North B Division

Relegation Playoffs			Test Match
			Bet	Hapoel R. Menashe Megiddo	1
Jez2	Tzeirei Umm al-Fahm	4	Jez2	Tzeirei Umm al-Fahm	3
Sho2	Hapoel Kiryat Yam	0

Promotion to Liga Bet South B Division

Relegation Playoffs			Test Match
			Bet	F.C. Be'er Sheva	0
Cen2	Bnei Yeechalal	2	Sth2	Maccabi Be'er Sheva	3
Sth2	Maccabi Be'er Sheva	4
