= 2015–16 Israel State Cup =

Tournament details
- Country: Israel

Final positions
- Champions: Maccabi Haifa
- Runners-up: Maccabi Tel Aviv

Tournament statistics
- Matches played: 155
- Goals scored: 499 (3.22 per match)
- Top goal scorer(s): Atef Abu Bilal (Mac. Segev Shalom) (7 goals)

The 2015–16 Israel State Cup (Hebrew: גביע המדינה, Gvia HaMedina) was the 77th season of Israel's nationwide football cup competition and the 62nd after the Israeli Declaration of Independence.

The competition started on 4 September 2015, and the final was held on 24 May 2016.

The competition was won by Maccabi Haifa, who beat Maccabi Tel Aviv 1–0 in the final.

== Preliminary rounds ==
=== First to fourth rounds ===
Rounds 1 to 4 double as cup competition for each division in Liga Bet and Liga Gimel. The two third-round winners from each Liga Bet division and the fourth-round winner from each Liga Gimel division advance to the sixth round.

==== Liga Bet ====
===== Liga Bet North A =====
Home team	Score	Away team
First Round
Ahi Acre	w/o	Ahi Bir al-Maksur
Beitar Nahariya	w/o	Hapoel Ihud Kafr Sumei
Ironi Bnei Kabul	w/o	Hapoel Bnei Maghar
F.C. Tzeirei Kafr Kanna	1–3	Hapoel Shefa-'Amr
Second Round
Ahi Bir al-Maksur	w/o	Beitar Haifa
Maccabi Ironi Acre	0–1	Ironi Bnei Kabul
Beitar Nahariya	w/o	Hapoel Kaukab
Al-Nahda Nazareth	0–1 (a.e.t.)	Hapoel Shefa-'Amr
Third Round
Ironi Bnei Kabul	2–1	Hapoel Shefa-'Amr
Beitar Nahariya	2–0	Beitar Haifa
Fourth Round
Beitar Naharyia	1–4	Ironi Bnei Kabul

Ironi Bnei Kabul won the district cup; Ironi Bnei Kabul and Beitar Nahariya advanced to the sixth round.

===== Liga Bet North B =====
Home team	Score	Away team
First Round
	–	
Second Round
Tzeirei Tur'an	w/o	Hap. Ramot Menashe Megiddo
Ihud Bnei Baqa	1–0	Hapoel Bnei Zalafa
F.C. Haifa Robi Shapira	2–1	Ihud Bnei Kafr Qara
Hapoel Umm al-Fahm	w/o	F.C. Pardes Hanna-Karkur
Third Round
F.C. Pardes Hanna-Karkur	1–3	Hap. Ramot Menashe Megiddo
F.C. Haifa Robi Shapira	2–1	Ihud Bnei Baqa
Fourth Round
F.C. Haifa Robi Shapira	4–1	Hap. Ramot Menashe Megiddo

F.C. Haifa Robi Shapira won the district cup; F.C. Haifa Robi Shapira and Hap. Ramot Menashe Megiddo advanced to the sixth round.

===== Liga Bet South A =====
Home team	Score	Away
First Round
A.S. Holon	w/o	F.C. Tzeirei Tayibe
Beitar Petah Tikva	4–1	Hapoel Ramat Israel
Beitar Ramat Gan	0–1	Hapoel Tzafririm Holon
Hapoel Pardesiya	3–1	Hapoel Kafr Qasim Shouaa
Hapoel Nahlat Yehuda	0–2 (a.e.t.)	F.C. Ironi Or Yehuda
Hapoel Kiryat Ono	2–0	Ironi Beit Dagan
F.C. Bnei Jaffa Ortodoxim	w/o	F.C. Roei Heshbon Tel Aviv
Second Round
F.C. Ironi Or Yehuda	1–1 (a.e.t.) (5–3 p)	Hapoel Pardesiya
F.C. Tzeirei Tayibe	1–0	Hapoel Tzafririm Holon
F.C. Roei Heshbon Tel Aviv	2–0	Beitar Petah Tikva
Hapoel Kiryat Ono	0–4	F.C. Tira
Third Round
F.C. Ironi Or Yehuda	4–1 (a.e.t.)	F.C. Tzeirei Tayibe
F.C. Roei Heshbon Tel Aviv	2–2 (a.e.t.) (5–4 p)	F.C. Tira
Fourth Round
F.C. Ironi Or Yehuda	0–2	F.C. Roei Heshbon Tel Aviv

F.C. Roei Heshbon Tel Aviv won the district cup; F.C. Roei Heshbon Tel Aviv and F.C. Ironi Or Yehuda advanced to the sixth round.

===== Liga Bet South B =====
Home team	Score	Away team
First Round
Ironi Modi'in	2–3	Beitar Giv'at Ze'ev
Beitar Yavne	1–2	Bnei Yeechalal Rehovot
Maccabi Kiryat Malakhi	w/o	F.C. Holon Yaniv
F.C. Be'er Sheva	1–4	Maccabi Segev Shalom
Maccabi Be'er Sheva	w/o	Moadon Tzeirei Rahat
Second Round
Maccabi Kiryat Malakhi	w/o	Moadon Tzeirei Rahat
Maccabi Segev Shalom	1–1 (a.e.t.) (4–3 p)	Maccabi Netivot
Bnei Yeechalal Rehovot	2–1	F.C. Dimona
Beitar Giv'at Ze'ev	w/o	Ironi Beit Shemesh
Third Round
Maccabi Segev Shalom	2–1	Moadon Tzeirei Rahat
Beitar Giv'at Ze'ev	1–3	Bnei Yeechalal Rehovot
Fourth Round
Bnei Yeechalal Rehovot	3–1	Maccabi Segev Shalom

Bnei Yeechalal Rehovot won the district cup; Bnei Yeechalal Rehovot and Maccabi Segev Shalom advanced to the sixth round.

==== Liga Gimel ====
===== Liga Gimel Upper Galilee =====
Home team	Score	Away team
First Round
	–	
Second Round
Bnei HaGolan	w/o	F.C. Hatzor HaGlilit
Third Round
Hapoel Bnei Peki'in	1–1 (a.e.t.) (2–4 p)	F.C. Hatzor HaGlilit
Hapoel Bnei Hurfeish	0–5	F.C. Julis
Fourth Round
F.C. Julis	1–2	F.C. Hatzor HaGlilit

F.C. Hatzor HaGlilit won the district cup and advanced to the sixth round.

===== Liga Gimel Lower Galilee =====
Home team	Score	Away team
First Round
	–	
Second Round
F.C. Halat al-Sharif	w/o	F.C. Tzeirei Tamra
Hapoel Bnei Deir al-Asad	w/o	Ahva Arraba
Third Round
F.C. Tzeirei Tamra	w/o	Ahva Arraba
F.C. Tzeirei Ibtin Khawaled	w/o	Hapoel Bnei Nujeidat
Fourth Round
Hapoel Bnei Nujeidat	w/o	F.C. Tzeirei Tamra

F.C. Tzeirei Tamra won the district cup and advanced to the sixth round.

===== Liga Gimel Jezreel =====
Home team	Score	Away team
First Round
	–	
Second Round
Beitar al-Amal Nazareth	0–4	Hapoel Bnei Musmus
Hapoel al-Ittihad Nazareth	1–2	Maccabi Ahi Ar'ara 'Ara
Hapoel Bnei Fureidis	w/o	Hapoel Bnei Ar'ara 'Ara
Hapoel Isfiya	w/o	Maccabi Basmat Tab'un
Third Round
Maccabi Ahi Ar'ara 'Ara	0–3	Hapoel Bnei Ar'ara 'Ara
Maccabi Basmat Tab'un	w/o	Hapoel Bnei Musmus
Fourth Round
Hapoel Bnei Ar'ara 'Ara	2–1	Hapoel Bnei Musmus

Hapoel Bnei Ar'ara 'Ara won the district cup and advanced to the sixth round.

===== Liga Gimel Shomron =====
Home team	Score	Away team
First Round
	–	
Second Round
Hapoel Bnei Jisr az-Zarqa	w/o	Hapoel Ironi Or Akiva
Hapoel Kiryat Yam	1–4	Hapoel Tirat HaCarmel
Maccabi Neve Sha'anan	w/o	Hapoel Ein as-Sahala
Third Round
Maccabi Neve Sha'anan	0–1	Hapoel Ironi Or Akiva
Hapoel Tirat HaCarmel	3–0	Hapoel Halissa
Fourth Round
Hapoel Tirat HaCarmel	3–4 (a.e.t.)	Hapoel Ironi Or Akiva

Hapoel Ironi Or Akiva won the district cup and advanced to the sixth round.

===== Liga Gimel Sharon =====
Home team	Score	Away team
First Round
Second Round
Maccabi HaSharon Netanya	w/o	F.C. Netanya
Beitar Tubruk	w/o	Ironi Ariel
Hapoel Oranit	1–1 (a.e.t.) (6–7 p)	F.C. Kafr Qasim Nibrass
Hapoel Ihud Bnei Jatt	1–0	Hapoel Kafr Bara
Third Round
Ironi Ariel	1–4	Hapoel Ihud Bnei Jatt
F.C. Kafr Qasim Nibrass	2–5	F.C. Netanya
Fourth Round
Hapoel Ihud Bnei Jatt	2–1	F.C. Netanya

Hapoel Ihud Bnei Jatt won the district cup and advanced to the sixth round.

===== Liga Gimel Tel Aviv =====
Home team	Score	Away team
First Round
Shimshon Tel Aviv	7–0	Maccabi Spartak Ramat Gan
Second Round
Beitar Jaffa	4–3	Bnei Yehud
Maccabi Ironi Or Yehuda	1–9	Otzma F.C. Holon
Hapoel Neve Golan	1–3 (a.e.t.)	Hapoel Kiryat Shalom
Shikun Vatikim Ramat Gan	0–5	Shimshon Tel Aviv
Third Round
Shimshon Tel Aviv	5–1	Hapoel Kiryat Shalom
Beitar Jaffa	5–3	Otzma F.C. Holon
Fourth Round
Beitar Jaffa	2–3 (a.e.t.)	Shimshon Tel Aviv

Shimshon Tel Aviv won the district cup and advanced to the sixth round.

===== Liga Gimel Center =====
Home team	Score	Away team
First Round
Hapoel Matzliah	4–2	Hapoel Ramla
Second Round
Hapoel Matzliah	w/o	Hapoel Abirei Bat Yam
Maccabi Kiryat Ekron	7–0	Hapoel Mevaseret Zion
Hapoel Ironi Gedera	0–1	A.S. Nordia Jerusalem
Hapoel F.C. Hevel Modi'in	2–0	Hapoel Tirat Shalom
Third Round
Maccabi Kiryat Ekron	3–4	A.S. Nordia Jerusalem
Hapoel F.C. Hevel Modi'in	5–0	Hapoel Matzliah
Fourth Round
A.S. Nordia Jerusalem	2–2 (a.e.t.) (6–5 p)	Hapoel F.C. Hevel Modi'in

A.S. Nordia Jerusalem won the district cup and advanced to the sixth round.

===== Liga Gimel South =====
Home team	Score	Away team
First Round
A.S. Ashdod	6–0	F.C. Tzeirei al-Hoshla
F.C. Be'er Sheva Haim Levy	2–3	Hapoel Bnei Ashdod
Maccabi Sderot	1–0	Maccabi Dimona
Hapoel Tzeirei al-Mahdi	2–7	F.C. Arad
F.C. Ironi Kuseife	1–7	Maccabi Ironi Hura
Second Round
Maccabi Sderot	0–3	Hapoel Bnei Ashdod
A.S. Ashdod	0–0 (a.e.t.) (4–2 p)	F.C. Hapoel Yeruham
F.C. Arad	0–1	Maccabi Ironi Ashdod
Elitzur Ironi Yehuda	2–1	Maccabi Ironi Hura
Third Round
Hapoel Bnei Ashdod	0–1	Maccabi Ironi Ashdod
Elitzur Ironi Yehuda	0–3	A.S. Ashdod
Fourth Round
Maccabi Ironi Ashdod	2–0	A.S. Ashdod

Maccabi Ironi Ashdod won the district cup and advanced to the sixth round.

=== Fifth Round ===
The fifth round is played within each division of Liga Alef. The winners qualify to the sixth round

Home team	Score	Away team
Liga Alef North
F.C. Karmiel Safed	0–2	Ironi Nesher
Hapoel Asi Gilboa	0–2	Ironi Tiberias
Hapoel Migdal HaEmek	1–2	Hapoel Herzliya
Hapoel Beit She'an	0–1	Maccabi Sektzia Ma'alot-Tarshiha
Hapoel Kafr Kanna	1–0	Maccabi Tzur Shalom
Hapoel Ironi Baqa al-Gharbiyye	2–1	Hapoel Hadera
Maccabi Daliyat al-Karmel	2–0	Ihud Bnei Majd al-Krum
Maccabi Ironi Kiryat Ata F.C.	1–0	Hapoel Iksal
Liga Alef South
Maccabi Kabilio Jaffa	1–0	F.C. Kafr Qasim
Hapoel Azor	4–0	F.C. Shikun HaMizrah
Hapoel Bik'at HaYarden	1–2	Hapoel Marmorek
Bnei Eilat	2–5 (a.e.t.)	Hapoel Kfar Shalem
Maccabi Amishav Petah Tikva	0–2	Maccabi Sha'arayim
Hakoah Amidar Ramat Gan	0–0 (a.e.t.) (4–3 p.)	Hapoel Hod HaSharon
Sektzia Nes Tziona	4–1	Hapoel Mahane Yehuda
Hapoel Morasha	1–3	Beitar Kfar Saba

== Nationwide Rounds ==
=== Sixth round ===
Home team	Score	Away team
Ironi Nesher	3–0	Beitar Nahariya
Maccabi Sektzia Ma'alot-Tarshiha	2–0	Hapoel Ramot Menashe Megiddo
Maccabi Daliyat al-Karmel	0–2	Ironi Kiryat Ata
Hapoel Ironi Or Akiva	0–4	F.C. Haifa Robi Shapira
Ironi Baqa al-Gharbiyye	2–1	F.C. Hatzor HaGlilit
Hapoel Bnei Ar'ara 'Ara	0–1	Hapoel Herzliya
Beitar Kfar Saba	3–0	A.S. Nordia Jerusalem
Maccabi Ironi Ashdod	0–1	Hakoah Amidar Ramat Gan
Bnei Yeechalal Rehovot	4–0	Hapoel Kfar Shalem
Shimshon Tel Aviv	1–2	Maccabi Sha'arayim
Hapoel Marmorek	2–0	F.C. Ironi Or Yehuda
Maccabi Kabilio Jaffa	3–2	Maccabi Segev Shalom
Hapoel Azor	1–3	Sektzia Nes Ziona
Hapoel Ihud Bnei Jatt	2–1	F.C. Roei Heshbon Tel Aviv
Ironi Bnei Kabul	0–1	Ironi Tiberias
Hapoel Kafr Kanna	3–0	F.C. Tzeirei Tamra

=== Seventh round ===
Home team	Score	Away team
Hapoel Nazareth Illit	2–2 (a.e.t.) (4–3 p.)	Ironi Nesher
Hapoel Bnei Lod	1–2	Maccabi Ahi Nazareth
Bnei Yeechalal Rehovot	1–3	Hakoah Amidar Ramat Gan
Hapoel Jerusalem	1–3	Hapoel Rishon LeZion
Beitar Tel Aviv Ramla	2–0	Hapoel Petah Tikva
Maccabi Yavne	2–0	Ironi Tiberias
Hapoel Kafr Kanna	1–3	Ironi Baqa al-Gharbiyye
Hapoel Herzliya	1–1 (a.e.t.) (0–3 p.)	Hapoel Ramat HaSharon
Hapoel Ashkelon	2–0	Maccabi Sha'arayim
F.C. Ashdod	2–1	Maccabi Ironi Kiryat Ata
F.C. Haifa Robi Shapira	0–1	Maccabi Kabilio Jaffa
Maccabi Herzliya	2–1	Hapoel Ihud Bnei Jatt
Beitar Kfar Saba	2–2 (a.e.t.) (4–3 p.)	Maccabi Sektzia Ma'alot-Tarshiha
Hapoel Marmorek	0–4	Sektzia Nes Tziona

=== Eighth round ===
Home team	Score	Away team
Ironi Baqa al-Gharbiyye	0–3	Hapoel Ashkelon
Maccabi Yavne	2–2 (a.e.t.) (4–5 p.)	Hapoel Ramat Gan
F.C. Ashdod	2–0	Maccabi Ahi Nazareth
Maccabi Petah Tikva	2–0	Ironi Kiryat Shmona
Maccabi Netanya	0–1	Sektzia Nes Tziona
Beitar Kfar Saba	1–2 (a.e.t.)	Bnei Sakhnin
Hapoel Haifa	3–1	Maccabi Kabilio Jaffa
Bnei Yehuda	2–1	Hapoel Acre
Hapoel Katamon Jerusalem	0–2	Hapoel Rishon LeZion
Maccabi Kiryat Gat	0–1	Hapoel Be'er Sheva
Hapoel Ra'anana	3–0	Hakoah Amidar Ramat Gan
Hapoel Kfar Saba	2–0	Hapoel Afula
Maccabi Herzliya	1–2	Beitar Tel Aviv Ramla
Hapoel Nazareth Illit	3–3 (a.e.t.) (2–4 p.)	Hapoel Tel Aviv
Maccabi Haifa	2–1	Beitar Jerusalem
Hapoel Ramat HaSharon	1–3	Maccabi Tel Aviv

=== Round of 16 ===
Home team	Score	Away team
Maccabi Haifa	1–0	Hapoel Haifa
Hapoel Rishon LeZion	1–2 (a.e.t.)	Maccabi Tel Aviv
Hapoel Kfar Saba	2–1	Hapoel Tel Aviv
Maccabi Petah Tikva	1–2	Hapoel Be'er Sheva
F.C. Ashdod	1–2	Bnei Yehuda
Hapoel Ashkelon	2–0	Hapoel Ramat Gan
Hapoel Ra'anana	0–0 (a.e.t.) (4–5 p.)	Beitar Tel Aviv Ramla
Sektzia Nes Tziona	0–0 (a.e.t.) (4–5 p.)	Bnei Sakhnin

=== Quarter-finals ===
Team 1	Agg.	Team 2	1st leg	2nd leg
Bnei Yehuda	3–6	Maccabi Haifa	2–2	1–4
Hapoel Kfar Saba	0–5	Maccabi Tel Aviv	0–3	0–2
Hapoel Be'er Sheva	4–0	Beitar Tel Aviv Ramla	2–0	2–0
Bnei Sakhnin	3–2	Hapoel Ashkelon	3–0	0–2

=== Semi-finals ===
20 April 2016	Hapoel Be'er Sheva	1–3	Maccabi Haifa	Haifa
20:30 (IDT)	Nwakaeme 87'	Summary; Report (Hebrew)	Plet 29', 32'; Atar 80'	Stadium: Sammy Ofer Stadium; Attendance: 26,200; Referee: Eitan Shmuelevitz

21 April 2016	Bnei Sakhnin	2–3	Maccabi Tel Aviv	Haifa
20:30 (IDT)	Mugrabi 22'; Azulay 52'	Summary; Report (Hebrew)	Yitzhaki 27'; Zahavi 66' (pen.); Ben Haim II 85'	Stadium: Sammy Ofer Stadium; Attendance: 25,000; Referee: Guy Berger

=== Final ===
24 May 2016	Maccabi Tel Aviv	0–1	Maccabi Haifa	Jerusalem
			Obraniak 36'	Stadium: Teddy Stadium; Referee: Roi Reinshreiber
