= Marco Wolff =

Argentine footballer (born 1996)

Personal information
- Date of birth: 14 December 1996 (age 29)
- Place of birth: Buenos Aires, Argentina
- Height: 1.88 m (6 ft 2 in)
- Position: Goalkeeper

Team information
- Current team: Hapoel Be'er Sheva
- Number: 34

Youth career
- Sociedad Hebraica
- Tigre

Senior career*
Years	Team	Apps	(Gls)
2017–2019	Tigre II		
2019–2021	Tigre	0	(0)
2021–2026	Maccabi Petah Tikva	103	(0)
2026–	Hapoel Be'er Sheva	0	(0)
- * Club domestic league appearances and goals as of 19:30, 14 June 2026 (UTC)

Marco Wolff (born 14 December 1996) is an Argentine professional footballer who plays as a goalkeeper for Israeli Premier League club Hapoel Be'er Sheva.

== Personal life ==
Born in Buenos Aires, Wolff is the son of Waldo Wolff, who was also a professional goalkeeper for clubs including Ituzaingó in Argentina and Maccabi Kiryat Gat in Israel. The elder Wolff later became a politician.

== Career ==
=== Tigre ===
Wolff began playing football for Sociedad Hebraica Argentina, and represented his nation at the 2013 Maccabiah Games. He began his professional career at Tigre, and made his only appearance for the club on 10 March 2020 in a 2–0 loss away to Club Bolívar of Bolivia. The game, the second of the group stage of the Copa Libertadores, was played at 3,500 metres above sea level in La Paz, and Tigre fielded several fringe players due to focus on the domestic league.

=== Maccabi Petah Tikva ===
In July 2021, Wolff transferred to Maccabi Petah Tikva in the Israeli Premier League on a one-year deal with the option of two more. He cited the COVID-19 pandemic in Argentina and his homeland's economic crisis as reasons for his emigration. Wolff, who is Jewish, qualifies for Israeli citizenship under the Law of Return and therefore does not take up a place in the league's quota of foreign players.

Wolff's team were relegated in his first season, but returned to the top flight as champions of the 2022–23 Liga Leumit. The title was sealed with a 7–0 win at Bnei Yehuda Tel Aviv on 1 May. Wolff said that he communicated with his teammates mainly in English, having a rudimentary knowledge of Hebrew.

On 30 May 2024, Wolff won his second title with the club, Israel State Cup, after beating Hapoel Be'er Sheva 1–0 in the final. He then signed a new contract until 2027.

=== Hapoel Be'er Sheva ===
On 14 June 2026, Wolff signed a three-year contract with Hapoel Be'er Sheva. His new club paid a transfer fee of 800,000 Israeli new shekels, and his annual salary was set at €160,000.

== Honours ==
Maccabi Petah Tikva

- Israel State Cup: 2023–24
- Liga Leumit: 2022–23
