= Eden Ben-Menashe =

Israeli footballer

Personal information
- Full name: Eden Ben-Menashe
- Date of birth: August 17, 1995 (age 31)
- Place of birth: Netanya, Israel
- Position: Midfielder

Team information
- Current team: Maccabi Kiryat Gat
- Number: 22

Youth career
- 2003–2014: Maccabi Netanya

Senior career*
Years	Team	Apps	(Gls)
2014–2016	Maccabi Netanya	1	(0)
2014	→ Hapoel Hod HaSharon	1	(0)
2014–2015	→ Maccabi HaSharon Netanya	3	(3)
2015–2016	→ Hapoel Pardesiya	29	(8)
2016	Hapoel Pardesiya	12	(6)
2016–2017	F.C. Tira	20	(2)
2017–2018	Hapoel Ihud Bnei Jatt	25	(9)
2018	Hapoel Bnei Fureidis	8	(0)
2018–2019	Hapoel Asi Gilboa	19	(4)
2019–2020	Hapoel Ashdod	20	(0)
2020–2021	Hapoel Migdal HaEmek	5	(0)
2021	Hapoel Herzliya	14	(1)
2021	Hapoel Ramat Gan	2	(0)
2021	F.C. Tira	8	(0)
2021–2022	F.C. Holon Yermiyahu	14	(0)
2022–2023	F.C. Dimona	29	(1)
2023–2024	Hapoel Kiryat Yam	12	(1)
2024	Hapoel Ra'anana	12	(1)
2024–2025	Nordia Jerusalem	33	(3)
2025–	Maccabi Kiryat Gat	0	(0)
- * Club domestic league appearances and goals as of 1 June 2025

Eden Ben-Menashe (Hebrew: עדן בן-מנשה; born August 17, 1995) is an Israeli footballer who plays for Maccabi Kiryat Gat.
