= Hapoel Merom HaGalil F.C. =

Israeli football club

Hapoel Merom HaGalil
- Full name: Hapoel Merom HaGalil Football Club הפועל מרום הגליל
- Founded: 2013
- Ground: Municipal Stadium, Safed
- Chairman: Guy Arbiv
- Manager: Moshe Sheli
- League: Liga Gimel Upper Galilee
- 2015–16: 9th
Home colours	Away colours

Hapoel Merom HaGalil (Hebrew: הפועל מרום הגליל) is an Israeli football club based in the Merom HaGalil Regional Council. The club currently plays in Liga Gimel Upper Galilee division.

== History ==
The club was established in 2013 and was placed in the Upper Galilee division of Liga Gimel. The players are locals to the regional council, Jewish, Druze and Circassians.

In the club's first season in Liga Gimel, the team was ranked 12th in the league and was eliminated from the 2013–14 after losing to Hapoel Nahariya in the second round.
