= Maccabi Sulam F.C. =

Israeli football club

- Full name: Maccabi Sulam Hani Football Club
- Founded: 2011
- Ground: Nein Stadium
- Manager: Jamil Hader
- League: Liga Bet North B
- 2015–16: Liga Bet North B, 8th

Maccabi Sulam (Hebrew: מכבי סולם) is an Israeli football club based in Sulam. The club currently plays in Liga Bet North B.

== History ==
The club was founded in 2011 and registered to play in Liga Gimel, where it was placed in the Jezreel division. The club played in this division for the following two seasons, until it was promoted at the end of the 2012–13 season, after winning a promotion playoff match against Beitar Kafr Kanna.
