= Agudat Sport Nordia Jerusalem =

Israeli football club

Beitar Nordia Jerusalem
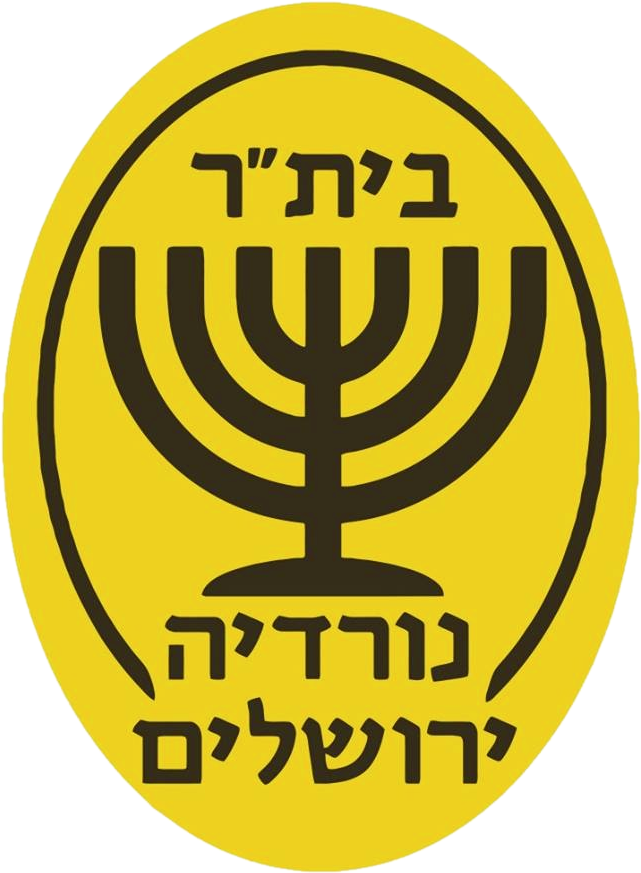
- Full name: Agudat Sport Nordia Jerusalem אגודת ספורט נורדיה ירושלים
- Short name: Betar Nordia Jerusalem
- Founded: 2014
- Ground: Hebrew University Stadium, Jerusalem
- Capacity: 4,000
- Owner: Beitar Nordia Jerusalem Fans Association
- Chairman: Yaron Sharfstein
- Manager: Eliran Maman
- League: Liga Alef South
- 2024–25: Liga Alef South, 2ndh of 16 (folded)
Home colours	Away colours

Agudat Sport Nordia Jerusalem (Hebrew: אגודת ספורט נורדיה ירושלים), also known as Beitar Nordia Jerusalem (Hebrew: בית״ר נורדיה ירושלים) is an Israeli football club based in Jerusalem. The club was formed in 2014 by Beitar Jerusalem supporters who are against violence and against racism, opposed to the La Familia supporter's group which took over the fan base in the years prior to the clubs' formation.

== Origins and formation ==
Beitar Jerusalem was established in 1936 and since the 1970s became a major force in Israeli football, winning 6 championships, 7 state cups, as well as several minor cups and spending most of its time in the Israeli top division.

Established in 2005, fan organization La Familia became dominant in the stands, voicing more racist views, edging out less extreme fans. As a result, in 2014, the disenfranchised fans organized a fans' association, named Beitar Nordia Jerusalem, in order to set a fan-owned football club. The club was initially called Beitar Nordia Jerusalem, after Zionist leader Max Nordau. By doing this, the club resurrected the original club's name between 1947 and 1948, as Nordia was the name chosen by the Beitar sport association teams after the association was disbanded by the Mandatory Palestine government due to the association's ties with the Irgun in 1947.

In August 2014 the club was registered with the IFA. However, the club was barred from using Beitar in its name, as it is not affiliated with the Beitar sport association. The club, therefore, settled on the name "Agudat Sport Nordia Jerusalem", and was registered to the Central division of Liga Gimel. On 17 October 2014 the club played it first official match, beating Maccabi Kiryat Ekron 2–1 in the league.

== Honours ==
=== League ===
Years	Honour	No.
2014/15	Fifth tier	3
2015/16	Fifth tier	1
2016/17	Fourth tier	1
2017/18	Third tier	4
2018/19	Third tier	10
2019/20	Third tier	9
2020/21	Third tier	8
2021/22	Third tier	17
2022/23	Third tier	2
2023/24	Third tier	9
2024/25	Third tier	2
2025/26	Third tier	16

=== Cups ===
Honour	No.	Years
Liga Gimel divisional State Cup	1	2015–16

== Current squad ==
As to 28 August 2024

No.	Pos.	Nation	Player
1	GK	ISR	Nassim Hayek
3	DF	ISR	Amir Ella
4	DF	ISR	Bar Shushan
5	DF	ISR	Idan Sulimani
6	MF	ISR	Yonathan Mordechai
7	MF	ISR	Or Mizrahi
8	FW	ISR	Daniel Elmaleh
9	FW	ISR	Matan Schwarz
10	FW	ISR	Mahmoud Al-Iwisat
11	FW	ISR	Uziel Parado
12	MF	ISR	Amir Abeles

No.	Pos.	Nation	Player
13	MF	ISR	Lior Noy
16	MF	ISR	Eden Ben-Menashe
17	MF	ISR	Abdel Satter Haj Yahya
18	MF	ISR	Dasalyn Pitigo
21	DF	ISR	Adir Deri
26	DF	ISR	Ben Itzhak
42	MF	ISR	Meiron Tal
55	GK	ISR	Lidor Cohen
77	MF	ISR	Phillip Manneh
—	MF	ISR	Niv Sarel
—	MF	ISR	Inbal Shulman
