= Hapoel Ironi Or Akiva F.C. =

Israeli football club

Hapoel Ironi Or Akiva
- Full name: Hapoel Ironi Or Akiva Football Club הפועל עירוני אור עקיבא
- Founded: 1956; 2013 (re-founded)
- Dissolved: 2020
- Ground: Or Akiva Ground, Or Akiva
- Chairman: Nissim Swisa
- Manager: Yaron Shish
- League: Liga Gimel
- 2023–24: Liga Gimel Samaria, 10th
Home colours	Away colours

Hapoel Ironi Or Akiva (Hebrew: הפועל עירוני אור עקיבא) is an Israeli football club based in Or Akiva. The club currently plays in Liga Gimel Samaria division.

== History ==
A club called Hapoel Or Akiva existed as early as 1956, and played in Liga Gimel during the 1960s.

The current club was founded in 2013, as a successor to Maccabi Or Akiva, which was founded in 1966 and played in its prime in Liga Alef, the third tier of Israeli football, for the last time, in the 1995–96 season.

After the 2012–13 season, in which Maccabi Or Akiva finished at the bottom of Liga Gimel Samaria division, the Municipality of Or Akiva have decided to establish a new club instead, and appointed an association, in order to manage football in the city.

Hapoel Ironi Or Akiva finished their debut season in the 14th and second bottom place of Liga Gimel Samaria division.

In the 2015–16 season, the club have won the Israel State Cup for Liga Gimel Samaria division, following a victory of 4–3 after extra time, against Hapoel Tirat HaCarmel.

== Honours ==
=== Cups ===
Honour	No.	Years
Liga Gimel Samaria Division Cup	1	2015–16
