= Hapoel Bnei Ar'ara 'Ara F.C. =

Israeli football club

Hapoel Bnei Arara 'Ara
- Full name: Hapoel Bnei Arara 'Ara Football Club הפועל בני ערערה עארה هبوعيل أبناء عرعرة-عارة
- Founded: 2014
- Ground: Municipal Stadium, Ar'ara
- Manager: Mohammed Samara
- League: Liga Bet North B
- 2024–25: Liga Bet North B, 9th
| Home colours | Away colours |

Hapoel Bnei Arara 'Ara (Hebrew: הפועל בני ערערה עארה) (Arabic: هبوعيل أبناء عرعرة-عارة) is an Israeli football club based in Ar'ara. The club played in Liga Gimel Jezreel division during the 2015–16 season.

== History ==
The club was founded in 2014 as a new club, following the collapse of former club Hapoel Arara, which folded at the end of the 2011–12 season. The club joined Liga Gimel Jezreel division and placed fourth at the end of its first season. In its second season in Liga Gimel, the club topped its division without losing a match and was promoted to Liga Bet. The club also won the division cup, part of the State Cup competition, beating Hapoel Bnei Musmus 2–1 in the divisional final and qualifying for the national rounds of the competition. The club ended its cup run in the sixth round by, as it was beaten by Liga Alef club Hapoel Herzliya.

== Honours ==
=== League ===
| Honour | No. | Years |
|---|---|---|
| Fifth tier | 1 | 2015–16 |

=== Cups ===
| Honour | No. | Years |
|---|---|---|
| Liga Gimel Jezreel Division Cup | 1 | 2015–16 |
