= F.C. Netanya =

Israeli football club

- Full name: Moadon Sport Netanya Colette Cohen מועדון ספורט נתניה קולט כהן
- Founded: 2012
- Ground: Tubruk Stadium
- Capacity: 500
- Owner: Eli Cohen
- Chairman: Zvi Ben Haim
- Manager: Eli Cohen
- League: Liga Gimel Sharon
- 2015–16: 12th

F.C. Netanya (Hebrew: מועדון ספורט נתניה) is an Israeli football club based in Netanya. The club currently plays in Liga Gimel Sharon division.

== History ==
The club was founded in 2012 by Eli Cohen, who previously worked with Maccabi HaSharon Netnaya and named the club after his late mother. The club joined Liga Gimel Sharon division, where they played since, finishing in 8th position in 2015, its best finish to date.

In the State Cup, the club's best achievement is reaching the fourth round, the divisional final, in 2015–16, after beating F.C. Kafr Qasim Nibrass in the divisional semi-final 5–2. The club met Hapoel Ihud Bnei Jatt in the divisional final and lost 1–2.

At youth levels, the club operate Under-19 and Under 17 teams, which play in the regional lower divisions of their youth group.
