= F.C. Nazareth Illit =

Israeli football club

- Full name: Football Club Nazareth Illit
- Founded: 2012; 14 years ago
- Ground: Green Stadium, Nazareth Illit
- Capacity: 4,000
- Chairman: Sharon Swisa
- Manager: Roman Zolo
- League: Liga Gimel Jezreel
- 2015–16: 6th
Home colours	Away colours

Football Club Nazareth Illit (Hebrew: מועדון כדורגל נצרת עילית חנן אוחיון, Moadon Kaduregel Natzrat Illit) is an Israeli football club based in the city of Nazareth Illit.

== History ==
Several clubs named Maccabi Nazareth Illit existed, mostly playing the lower ranks of the Israeli football league system.

In 2007 the club was re-established and played for several seasons in Liga Gimel, before folding after the 2010–11 season.

The current club was established in July 2012 and was placed in the Jezreel division of Liga Gimel, finishing third in its first and second seasons. In the Cup, the club twice progressed to the third round before falling, in both occasions to Hapoel Sandala Gilboa.

At the beginning of the 2014–15 season the club was ordered to pay the Nazareth Illit municipality a sum of 40,000 NIS for using Green Stadium and, as a result, was facing closure. After negotiations with the municipality, the sum was waived and the club registered with the IFA.

The club was named after Israel Prison Service Sergeant, Hanan Ohayon, who perished in the 2010 Mount Carmel forest fire. However, his name was removed from the club's name at the request of the family in 2016.

== Stadium ==
The club plays its home games at the Green Stadium.

== See also ==
- Sports in Israel
