= F.C. Bnei M.M.B.E. HaGolan VeHaGalil =

Israeli football club

- Full name: F.C. Bnei M.M.B.E. HaGolan VeHaGalil מועדון ספורט בני "ממבע" הגולן והגליל النادي الرياضي ابناء الجولان والجليل
- Founded: 2015
- Ground: Municipal Stadium, Buqa'ata
- Owner: Faroq al-Balooshi
- Chairman: Jassim Fawaz
- Manager: Wajde al-Keesh
- League: Liga Bet North A
- 2024–25: Liga Bet North A, 11th
Home colours	Away colours

F.C. Bnei M.M.B.E. HaGolan VeHaGalil, also known as Bnei HaGolan VeHaGalil (lit.: sons of the Golan and the Galilee), or "Mamba" (based on the towns' initials), is an Israeli football club, playing in Liga Bet. The club was established in 2015 by Druze living in the Golan Heights, in the villages of Mas'ade, Majdal Shams, Buq'ata and Ein Qiniyye, which initials are incorporated in the club's name.

== History ==
The club was founded in 2015, the first senior team from the Golan Heights Druze to compain the Israeli football league system, and joined Liga Gimel, and registered to play in the Upper Galilee division. The club dominated the division for most of the season in a tight race with F.C. Julis, but a late rally from F.C. Julis had the club finishing 2nd, three points short of promotion to Liga Bet. In the 2016–2017, the club finished first in Liga Gimel - Upper Galilee Division, thereby earning promotion to Liga Bet.
