= Maccabi Kiryat Ekron F.C. =

Israeli football club

Maccabi Kiryat Ekron
- Full name: Maccabi Kiryat Ekron Asher Football Club
- Founded: 1962 (original club); 2014 (re-establishment)
- Dissolved: 2008
- Ground: Kiryat Ekron Stadium, Kiryat Ekron
- Manager: Erez David
- League: Liga Gimel Central
- 2015–16: 4th
Home colours	Away colours

Maccabi Kiryat Ekron Football Club (Hebrew: מועדון כדורגל מכבי קריית עקרון אשר) is an Israeli football club based in Kiryat Ekron. The club plays in Liga Gimel, the fifth tier of the Israeli football league system.

== History ==
The original club was established in 1962 and spent most of its years in the lower tiers of the Israeli football league system, rising, at its best, to Liga Bet, during the 1980s. In the Cup, the best performance by the club was in 1964–65, reaching the fourth round and losing 0–10 to Bnei Yehuda. The original club folded at the end of the 2007–08 season.

== Re-establishment ==
In 2014 the club was re-established and was named after former Kiryat Ekron deputy mayor, Asher Okavi. The club registered to the Central division of Liga Gimel and played its first match on 19 September 2014, beating Hapoel Gedera 3–2 in the Cup.

== Honours ==
- Liga Gimel
  - Central Division champions:
    - 1981–82
    - 1998–99

== Notable former players ==
- Idan Shriki
- Moshe Peretz
