= Hapoel Bnei Ashdod F.C. =

Israeli football club

Hapoel Bnei Ashdod
- Full name: Football Club Hapoel Bnei Ashdod Michel Azugi מ.כ. הפועל בני אשדוד מישל אזוגי
- Founded: 2015
- Ground: Synthetic Pitch, Ashdod
- Chairman: Ya'akov Shitrit
- Manager: Oren Dayan
- League: Liga Bet South B
- 2024–25: Liga Bet South B, 12th
Home colours	Away colours

Hapoel Bnei Ashdod (Hebrew: הפועל בני אשדוד) is an Israeli football club based in Ashdod. The club was formed in 2015 by Hapoel Ashdod supporters headed by former Hapoel Ashdod chairman Ya'akov Shitrit, as a resurrection of their old club, which was merged with Maccabi Ironi Ashdod to form F.C. Ashdod.

== Origins and formation ==
In 1998, Hapoel Ashdod and rival club Maccabi Ironi Ashdod were in debts and in decline and in order to save both football clubs, they were merged to form F.C. Ashdod. However, former supporters of Hapoel Ashdod were dissatisfied with the merger and set up a new club, Hapoel Namal Ashdod. The new club collapsed in 2004 due to financial difficulties.

In 2015, two separate initiatives were set to re-establish Hapoel Ashdod, one headed by former Hapoel Ashdod and Hapoel Namal Ashdod chairman, Ya'akov Shitrit, and the other headed by fans group named "1957 Reds". Shitrit's group was affiliated with the Hapoel organization, and was registered with the IFA as Hapoel Bnei Ashdod.

== History ==
On 18 September 2015 the club played it first official match, beating F.C. Be'er Sheva Haim Levy 3–2 in the first round of the State Cup. Initially, the club was coached by former Maccabi Kiryat Gat player Nir Hazut but Hazut quit before the beginning of the season and was replaced by Ami Jerbi. However, Jerbi left in November 2015 and was replaced by Avi Malul, which left himself in February 2016 and was replaced by Adam Shushan.

== Honours ==
=== Cups ===
Honour	No.	Years
Liga Gimel divisional State Cup	1	2017–18
