= F.C. Tzeirei Tamra =

- Full name: Football Club Tzeirei Tamra מועדון כדורגל צעירי טמרה هبوعيل شباب طمرة
- Founded: 2013
- Ground: Osama Ghanim Stadium
- Capacity: 2,000
- Owner: Fadi Ghanim
- Chairman: Tareq al-Kaabi
- Manager: Essam Zidan
- League: Liga Alef North
- 2024–25: Liga Bet North A, 1st (promoted)
Home colours	Away colours

F.C. Tzeirei Tamra (Hebrew: מועדון כדורגל צעירי טמרה, Arabic: شباب طمرة) is an Israeli football club based in Tamra. The club was established in 2013, as a successor club, to Hapoel Bnei Tamra, which was dissolved in 2010.

== History ==
The club was founded in the 2013 and joined Liga Gimel for the 2013–14 season and was placed in the Lower Galilee division. The club finished fifth in its first season and third in its second season.

In 2014–15 the club won the Lower Galilee division State Cup and progressed to the sixth round, where they were beaten by Maccabi Daliyat al Karmel. The club won the division cup the following season, as all other clubs in its division withdrew from the competition, and once again was beaten in the sixth round, this time by Hapoel Kafr Kanna.

== Honours ==
=== Cups ===
Honour	No.	Years
Liga Gimel Lower Galilee Division Cup	2	2014–15, 2015–16
