= F.C. Arad =

Israeli football club

- Full name: Moadon Kaduregel Arad מועדון כדורגל ערד
- Founded: 2012
- Dissolved: 2022
- Ground: Municipal Stadium, Arad
- Capacity: 4,000
- Chairman: Adam Collins
- Manager: Afik Arzuan
- League: Liga Gimel South
- 2021–22: 5th
Home colours	Away colours

F.C. Arad (Hebrew: מועדון כדורגל ערד), Moadon Kaduregel Arad, lit. Football Club Arad (or in short Hebrew: מ.כ. ערד, Mem Kaf Arad, lit. F.C. Arad) was an Israeli football club based in Arad. The club last played in the Liga Gimel South division.

== History ==
The club was founded in 2012, with the purpose of building a new club, which is based on local players from Arad. F.C. Arad joined Liga Gimel South division and played their first match on 28 September 2012, where they were beaten 1–2 by F.C. Rishon LeZion.

After finished their first season at the bottom of their division, and the following season as second bottom, the club's activity was ceased at the summer of 2014, due to financial problems and lack of support from the municipality of Arad. However, after local rivals, Hapoel Arad, were dissolved during the 2014–15 season, and a new mayor was elected in Arad, the club was re-established at the summer of 2015, supported by the municipality.
