= F.C. Julis =

Israeli football club

- Full name: Football Club Julis מועדון ספורט ג'וליס
- Founded: 2006
- Dissolved: 2017
- Ground: Municipal Stadium, Julis
- Manager: Hussein Aliyan
- League: Liga Gimel Upper Galilee
- 2015–16: 1st

F.C. Julis (Hebrew: מועדון ספורט ג'וליס) is an Israeli football club based in Julis. The club played in Liga Gimel Upper Galilee division during the 2015–16 season.

== History ==
The club was founded in 2006 and joined Liga Gimel, and registered to play in the Upper Galilee division. However, the club folded after four matches and its results were annulled. For the next several seasons, the club continued to operate with youth teams only, until a senior team was re-established in 2011. The club played 4 seasons in Liga Gimel, until winning its division in 2015–16 and promoting to Liga Bet.

In the State Cup, the club's best achievement was reaching the fourth round, in 2015–16, losing in the divisional cup final to F.C. Hatzor HaGlilit 1–2.
