= Hapoel Ihud Bnei Jatt F.C. =

Israeli football club

Hapoel Ihud Bnei Jatt
- Full name: Hapoel Ihud Bnei Jatt Football Club הפועל איחוד בני ג'ת الوحدة جت
- Founded: 2011
- Ground: Municipal Stadium, Jatt
- Owner: Fawzi Daher
- Chairman: Osama Hussein
- Manager: Riyan Taha
- League: Liga Gimel Sharon
- 2015–16: 1st

Hapoel Ihud Bnei Jatt (Hebrew: הפועל איחוד בני ג'ת), (Arabic: الوحدة جت) is an Israeli football club based in Jatt. The club played in Liga Gimel Sharon division during the 2015–16 season.

== History ==
The club was founded in 2011 and joined Liga Gimel, playing in the Samaria division in its first four seasons. The club finished second in 2012–13, missing out on promotion by four points after a tight title race with Hapoel Yokne'am. In 2015–16, the club was transferred to the Sharon division, which it won and was promoted to Liga Bet.

In the State Cup, the club's best achievement was reaching the seventh round, in 2015–16, beating Liga Bet club F.C. Roei Heshbon Tel Aviv 2–1 in the sixth round, and losing by the same score to Maccabi Herzliya from Liga Leumit.
