= Hapoel Neve Golan F.C. =

Israeli football club

Hapoel Neve Golan
- Full name: Hapoel Neve Golan Football Club הפועל נוה גולן
- Founded: 1969
- Ground: Neve Golan Ground, Tel Aviv
- Chairman: Morris Ben David
- Manager: Haim Lanziano
- League: Liga Gimel Tel Aviv
- 2015–16: 7th
Home colours	Away colours

Hapoel Neve Golan (Hebrew: הפועל נוה גולן) is an Israeli football club based in Neve Golan, Jaffa, Tel Aviv. The club is currently in Liga Gimel Tel Aviv division.

== History ==
The club was founded in 1969 in Jaffa and started at the newly formed bottom tier, Liga Dalet. Neve Golan reached Liga Bet, the fourth tier of Israeli football in the 1981–82 season. In the following season, the club reached its best placing ever, which was fourth in Liga Bet South A division. Neve Golan dropped back to Liga Gimel after they finished bottom of South A division in the 1984–85 season.

The club is currently playing in Liga Gimel Tel Aviv division. In 2011, former Israel international, Felix Halfon, played for the club. Halfon returned to the club in 2014, before leaving for Elitzur Jaffa Tel Aviv during the season.

At the end of the 2014–15 season, the club finished on top of Liga Gimel Tel Aviv division, level on points with Ironi Beit Dagan, which they faced in a decisive promotion play-off. Neve Golan lost 2–3 and remained in Liga Gimel.

== Honours ==
=== League ===
Honour	No.	Years
Fifth tier	1	1986–87
