= Beitar Pardes Hanna F.C. =

Israeli football club

Beitar Pardes Hanna
- Full name: Beitar Pardes Hanna Football Club בית״ר פרדס חנה
- Founded: 1955
- Ground: Municipal Stadium, Pardes Hanna-Karkur
- Chairman: Jacky Shushan
- League: Liga Gimel
- 2023–24: Liga Gimel Samaria, 13th
Home colours	Away colours

Beitar Pardes Hanna (Hebrew: בית״ר פרדס חנה) is an Israeli football club based in Pardes Hanna-Karkur. The club currently plays in Liga Gimel Samaria division.

== History ==
The club was founded in 1955 and joined Liga Gimel, the fourth tier of Israeli football at the time.

Beitar have played its entire history in the lower divisions of Israeli football, mostly in Liga Gimel. However, in the 2005–06 season, the club won Liga Gimel Sharon division and were promoted to Liga Bet, the fifth tier at the time. After finished 13th of Liga Bet South A division in the 2006–07 season, Beitar finished the following season at the 15th and second bottom place, and thus dropped back to Liga Gimel, where they play today, at the Samaria division.

== Honours ==
=== League ===
Honour	No.	Years
Sixth tier	1	2005–06
