= F.C. Be'er Sheva Shua Tal =

Israeli football club

- Full name: Moadon Kaduregel Be'er Sheva Shua Tal מועדון כדורגל באר שבע שועה טל
- Founded: 2013
- Ground: Reisser Synthetic Ground, Be'er Sheva
- Chairman: Haim Cohen
- Manager: Shaked Buaron
- League: Liga Gimel
- 2023–24: Liga Gimel South, 6th
Home colours	Away colours

F.C. Be'er Sheva Shua Tal (Hebrew: מועדון כדורגל באר שבע שועה טל), Moadon Kaduregel Be'er Sheva Shua Tal, lit. Football Club Be'er Sheva Shua Tal (or in short Hebrew: מ.כ. באר שבע שועה טל, Mem Kaf Be'er Sheva Shua Tal, lit. F.C. Be'er Sheva Shua Tal) is an Israeli football club based in Be'er Sheva.

== History ==
The club was founded in 2013 by a group of Hapoel Be'er Sheva fans, which played football on Saturdays for several years. They decided to form their own team and to register it in the Israel Football Association. The club consists only of Hapoel Be'er Sheva fans. The club is currently in the Liga Gimel South division and play their home matches at the Reisser Synthetic Ground, which they share with youth teams of Hapoel Be'er Sheva.

The club is named after Haim Levy, a fan of Hapoel Be'er Sheva, who died after battling cancer aged 34.

The club finished their debut season in the seventh place of Liga Gimel South division.
