= Shikun Vatikim Ramat Gan F.C. =

Israeli football club

Shikun Vatikim Ramat Gan
- Full name: Shikun Vatikim Ramat Gan Football Club מועדון כדורגל שיכון ותיקים רמת גן
- Founded: 2002
- Ground: Ramat Gan Training Ground, Ramat Gan
- Chairman: Peretz Maya
- Manager: Alon Tarshish
- League: Liga Gimel Tel Aviv
- 2015–16: 4th
Home colours	Away colours

Shikun Vatikim Ramat Gan (Hebrew: שיכון ותיקים רמת גן) is an Israeli football club based in the Shikun Vatikim neighbourhood of Ramat Gan. The club currently plays in Liga Gimel Tel Aviv division.

== History ==
The club was founded in 2002 and joined Liga Gimel. In the 2005–06 season, the club won Liga Gimel Tel Aviv division, after a close battle with F.C. Ironi Or Yehuda, and achieved promotion for the first time in its history to Liga Bet, the fifth tier of Israeli football at the time. The club played seven successive seasons in Liga Bet (which became the fourth tier in the 2009–10 season, due to the closure of Liga Artzit), and reached their best placing in that league, which was ninth, in the 2006–07 season. In the 2010–11 season, Shikun Vatikim avoided relegation, after they faced local rivals, Beitar Ramat Gan, in the first round of the Relegation play-offs, and won 4–2 on penalties after draw of 2–2 in 120 minutes. In the 2012–13 season, the club finished at the bottom of Liga Bet South A division and relegated to Liga Gimel, where they play today.

== Honours ==
- Liga Gimel Tel Aviv:
  - 2005–06
