= Beitar Ezra F.C. =

Israeli football club

Beitar Ezra
- Full name: Beitar Ezra FC בית״ר עזרא
- Founded: 1954
- Ground: Neve Golan Ground, Tel Aviv
- Chairman: Tzadok Hamami
- Manager: Guy Kario
- Coach: Yossi Saka
- League: Liga Gimel Tel Aviv
- 8th
Home colours	Away colours

Beitar Ezra (Hebrew: בית״ר עזרא) is an Israeli football club based in the Ezra neighbourhood of Tel Aviv. The club currently plays in Liga Gimel Tel Aviv division. Today, the first Captain in the team is Gilor Bardush, and the secondary is Amir Itzhaki.

== History ==
The club was founded in 1954 and played its entire history in the lower divisions of Israeli football.

Beitar joined Liga Gimel at the 1954–55 season, the last season in which Liga Gimel was the third tier of Israeli football league system. The club's best period was in the mid-1960s, when they won Liga Gimel Tel Aviv division in the 1962–63 season and promoted to Liga Bet, then the third tier. In the 1964–65 season, Beitar was topping the table of Liga Bet South A division after 15 games and was crowned as the "winter champions" of the league. However, a drop in form saw the club finish the league at the seventh place. In the following season, the club finished second from bottom and relegated back to Liga Gimel after three seasons playing in Liga Bet. From that point, the club gained a reputation as one of the weakest teams in Israeli football. Beitar conceded 202 goals at the "double season" of 1966–68, and in 1969, the club found itself playing at the newly formed bottom tier, Liga Dalet. In 1985, Liga Dalet was scrapped and the club returned to Liga Gimel, where it continues to play in the Tel Aviv division. The 2009–10 season was exceptional, as the club finished the league with even number of wins, draws and losses and with a positive goal difference of +14.

The club's founder and chairman, Tzadok Hamami, who holds a UEFA Pro Licence, renewed his footballer card at the age of 82. However, his last match as an active player for Beitar Ezra, was on 25 December 2009, aged 79, when he entered as substitute at the 90th minute in the 0–0 draw against Hapoel Neve Golan.

== Current squad ==
As to 16 January 2020

No.	Pos.	Nation	Player
1	GK	ISR	Hassan nagdi
2	DF	ISR	Muhammed haj
3	DF	ISR	Barak segalovitch
4	DF	ISR	Abed abu anza
5	DF	ISR	Ibrahim gahleb
6	DF	ISR	Amir itzhaki
7	MF	ISR	Mohammad huni
8	MF	ISR	Dvir levi
9	MF	ISR	Yossi saka
10	FW	ISR	Roei halfon
11	MF	ISR	Gilor bardush
12	MF	ISR	Yahav cohen
24	MF	ISR	Abed atrash
15	FW	ISR	Netanel avraham
17	FW	ISR	Butrus abu

No.	Pos.	Nation	Player
18	DF	ISR	Yehezkel mashiach
19	DF	ISR	Idan
20	MF	ISR	Matan
22	DF	ISR	Lior mirzazada
23	MF	ISR	Idan shiri
14	FW	ISR	Eliran Hajby
26	DF	ISR	Dan
77	FW	ISR	Mustafa shakra
99	GK	ISR	Avi malachi
