= F.C. Roei Heshbon Tel Aviv =

Israeli football club

Roei Heshbon Tel Aviv
- Full name: Moadon Sport Roei Heshbon Tel Aviv מועדון ספורט רוח תל אביב
- Founded: 2009
- Ground: Kiryat Shalom Ground, Tel Aviv
- Chairman: Shay Levkovitch
- Manager: Mordechai Yaish
- League: Liga Bet South A
- 2014–15: 9th
Home colours	Away colours

F.C. Roei Heshbon Tel Aviv (Hebrew: מועדון ספורט רואי חשבון תל אביב, Moadon Sport Roei Heshbon Tel Aviv, lit. Certified Public Accountants Tel Aviv Sport Club or in short Hebrew: מ.ס. רו"ח תל אביב, Mem Samekh Roah Tel Aviv, lit. F.C. C.P.A. Tel Aviv) is an Israeli football club based in Tel Aviv. They play their home matches at Kiryat Shalom Ground, located at Maccabi Tel Aviv's training center in Kiryat Shalom neighborhood.

The club is currently in Liga Bet South A division.

== Background ==
The club was founded in 2009 by a group of Certified Public Accountants, aiming to combine between Sports and Academy. Approximately 80 percents of the club players are academics, mostly CPAs. Most of the club players have already played for other football clubs, particularly at the lower levels of Israeli football league system.

The club has cooperation with the youth section of Maccabi Tel Aviv. Roei Heshbon players are passing academic tutoring for Maccabi Tel Aviv youth players, and prepare them for the matriculation exams. In return, Roei Heshbon are given the opportunity to train and host home matches at Maccabi Tel Aviv's training center in Kiryat Shalom.

== History ==
The club started at Liga Gimel Tel Aviv division in the 2009–10 season. After five seasons playing at the bottom tier, the club won the Tel Aviv division in the 2013–14 season, after a close battle with A.S. Holon, and was promoted for the first time in its history to Liga Bet, the fourth tier of Israeli football.

The club finished its first season in Liga Bet at the ninth place of South A division.

== Honours ==
- Liga Gimel Tel Aviv:
  - 2013–14
