= Elitzur Jaffa Tel Aviv F.C. =

Israeli football club

Elitzur Jaffa Tel Aviv
- Full name: Elitzur Jaffa Tel Aviv Football Club אליצור יפו תל אביב
- Founded: 2003
- Ground: Neve Golan Ground, Tel Aviv
- Manager: Yossi Aminoff
- League: Liga Gimel Tel Aviv
- 2015–16: 10th
Home colours	Away colours

Elitzur Jaffa Tel Aviv (Hebrew: אליצור יפו תל אביב), or simply Elitzur Jaffa, is an Israeli football club based in Jaffa, Tel Aviv. The club is currently in Liga Gimel Tel Aviv division.

== History ==
The club was founded in 2003 and joined Liga Gimel Tel Aviv division, where they play ever since.

For the 2014–15 season, the club aimed for promotion to Liga Bet, and signed several experienced players. During the season, the club was joined by former Israel international, Felix Halfon (which left after 5 matches for Hapoel Abirei Bat Yam) and former Israel U-21 international, Reuven Oved. The club finished the season in the fourth place, its best placing to date.
