= Maccabi Neve Sha'anan Eldad F.C. =

Israeli football club

Maccabi Neve Sha'anan Eldad
- Full name: Maccabi Neve Sha'anan Eldad Football Club
- Founded: 1965
- Ground: Avi Ran Ground, Haifa
- Chairman: (Israel) Yosef Shriki
- Manager: (Israel) Eli Peso
- League: Liga Alef North
- 2024–25: Liga Bet North B, 1st (promoted)
Home colours	Away colours

Maccabi Neve Sha'anan Eldad F.C.

== History ==
During his reserve duty in the IDF, Maccabi Neve Sha'anan player Eldad Regev was abducted by Hezbollah forces. From that moment on, the club printed on its shirts, "Eldad, we're waiting for you on the pitch." In his honour, the club is considering changing its name to Maccabi Eldad Haifa and out of respect of Regev's father, a religious Jew, they will move all games to Fridays before the Jewish Sabbath.

== Club Officials ==
=== Coaching staff ===
- Manager: Yosef Shriki

=== Front Office ===
- Club Official: Eli Dahan
- Club Official: Eli Hadadi
- Club Official: Moshe Birnbaum
- Club Official: Dini Ben-Simon
