= 2013–14 Israel State Cup =

Tournament details
- Country: Israel

Final positions
- Champions: Ironi Kiryat Shmona
- Runners-up: Maccabi Netanya

Tournament statistics
- Matches played: 187
- Goals scored: 681 (3.64 per match)
- Top goal scorer(s): Dia Saba (M. Petah Tikva); Eitan Toker (H. Kafr Qasim Shouaa); Ilan Tal (Sektzia Ma'alot); Daniel Darsian Tasao (Sektzia Ma'alot) (6 goals)

The 2013–14 Israel State Cup (Hebrew: גביע המדינה, Gvia HaMedina) was the 75th season of Israel's nationwide football cup competition and the 60th after the Israeli Declaration of Independence. It began in August 2013, while the final was held in Ramat Gan Stadium on 7 May 2014.

The competition was won by Ironi Kiryat Shmona, who had beaten Maccabi Netanya 1–0 in the final.

By winning, Ironi Kiryat Shmona qualified for the 2014–15 UEFA Europa League, entering in the third qualifying round.

== Preliminary rounds ==
=== First round ===
| Home team | Score | Away team |
Liga Bet North A
| Beitar Haifa | 2–3 | Maccabi Sektzia Ma'alot-Tarshiha |
| Ahi Acre | 4–0 | Hapoel Ihud Bnei Sumei |
| Hapoel Kaukab | w/o | Maccabi Ironi Acre |
| Hapoel Shefa-'Amr | 2–1 | F.C. Ahva Kafr Manda |
| Ironi Bnei Kabul | 3–2 (a.e.t.) | Hapoel Bnei Maghar |
Liga Bet North B
| Hapoel Baqa al-Gharbiyye | w/o | F.C. Bu'eine |
| Hapoel Iksal | 5–0 | Hapoel Isfiya |
| Hapoel Ramot Menashe Megiddo | 1–4 | F.C. Daburiyya |
| Hapoel Umm al-Fahm | 1–2 | Maccabi Ein Mahil Jamel |
| Hapoel Yokneam | 2–1 | F.C. Tzeirei Tur'an |
| Ironi Nesher | 1–5 (a.e.t.) | Hapoel Bnei Nujeidat |
| Maccabi Kafr Qara | 3–2 | Maccabi Ahi Iksal |
Liga Bet South A
| Tzafririm Holon | 2–3 | Hapoel Kiryat Ono |
| Beitar Petah Tikva | 2–5 | F.C. Tira |
| Beitar Ramat Gan | 1–6 | Hapoel Ramat Yisrael |
| Hapoel Ironi Hod HaSharon | 2–0 | F.C. Ironi Or Yehuda |
| Hapoel Morasha Ramat HaSharon | 3–1 | Maccabi Bnei Jaljulia |
| Otzma F.C. Holon | 1–3 | F.C. Bnei Jaffa Ortodoxim |
| Shimshon Bnei Tayibe | 0–2 | Maccabi Kfar Yona |
Liga Bet South B
| Beitar Giv'at Ze'ev | 4–0 | F.C. Tzeirei Tayibe |
| Beitar Ironi Ma'ale Adumim | 3–0 | Maccabi Ironi Sderot |
| F.C. Be'er Sheva | 2–3 | F.C. Dimona |
| Hapoel Abirei Bat Yam | w/o | Hapoel Rahat |
| Hapoel Nahlat Yehuda | 3–0 | Bnei Yeechalal Rehovot |
| Ironi Modi'in | 2–0 | Ironi Beit Shemesh |
| Maccabi Ironi Netivot | 4–0 | Hapoel Arad |
Liga Gimel Upper Galilee
| Hapoel Bnei Peki'in | 3–5 | Hapoel Bnei Hurfeish |
Liga Gimel Lower Galilee
| F.C. Kfar Kama | w/o | Maccabi Bnei Deir Hanna |
| Beitar Kafr Kanna | 6–1 | Beitar Ein Mahil |
Liga Gimel Jezreel
| Beitar el-Amal Nazareth | 0–2 | Hapoel al-Ittihad Nazareth |
| Bnei Umm el-Fahm | w/o | Hapoel Mu'awiya |
| Hapoel Bnei Nazareth | 1–9 | F.C. Nazareth Illit Hanan Ohayon |
| Hapoel F.C. Sandala Gilboa | 3–1 | Hapoel Bnei Zalafa |
| Maccabi Isfiya | 2–1 (a.e.t.) | Hapoel Kafr Qara |
Liga Gimel Shomron
| Beitar Pardes Hanna | 1–2 | F.C. Pardes Hanna-Karkur |
| Maccabi Moriah | w/o | F.C. Baqa |
Liga Gimel Sharon
| Beitar Ironi Ariel | 1–2 | Hapoel Oranit |
| Beitar Tubruk | 2–0 | F.C. Netanya |
| Hapoel Aliyah Kfar Saba | w/o | F.C. Bnei Ra'anana |
| Hapoel Kafr Bara | w/o | Hapoel Kafr Qasim Shouaa |
| Hapoel Pardesiya | 2–0 | Shimson Kafr Qasim |
Liga Gimel Tel Aviv
| Elitzur Yehud | 1–0 (a.e.t.) | F.C. Mahanaim Ramat Gan |
| Hapoel Neve Golan | 2–0 | Beitar Jaffa |
| A.S. Holon | 3–0 | Elitzur Jaffa Tel Aviv |
| F.C. Roei Heshbon Tel Aviv | 5–1 | Bnei Yehud |
| Shikun Vatikim Ramat Gan | 3–2 (a.e.t.) | Maccabi Ironi Or Yehuda |
| Hapoel Kiryat Shalom | 1–1 (a.e.t.) 5–4 p. | Hapoel F.C. Giv'at Shmuel |
Liga Gimel South
| Moadon Kaduregel Be'er Sheva | 1–1 (a.e.t.) 3–4 p. | Hapoel Tel Sheva |

=== Second round ===
| Home team | Score | Away team |
Liga Bet North A
| Hapoel Sakhnin | w/o | Ahi Acre |
| Hapoel Shefa-'Amr | 0–4 | Hapoel Kafr Kanna |
| Ihud Bnei Majd al-Krum | 0–1 | Maccabi Sektzia Ma'alot-Tarshiha |
| Ironi Bnei Kabul | 1–2 (a.e.t.) | Maccabi Ironi Acre |
Liga Bet North B
| Hapoel Baqa al-Gharbiyye | 7–1 | Hapoel Yokneam |
| Hapoel Bnei Nujeidat | w/o | Maccabi Ein Mahil Jamel |
| Maccabi Kafr Qara | 1–2 | Hapoel Iksal |
| Maccabi Sulam | 2–0 (a.e.t.) | F.C. Daburiyya |
Liga Bet South A
| F.C. Tira | 1–2 (a.e.t.) | Hapoel Kiryat Ono |
| Hapoel Bik'at HaYarden | 1–4 | F.C. Bnei Jaffa Ortodoxim |
| Hapoel Morasha Ramat HaSharon | 0–2 | Hapoel Ironi Hod HaSharon |
| Maccabi Kfar Yona | 4–1 | Hapoel Ramat Yisrael |
Liga Bet South B
| F.C. Dimona | 3–3 (a.e.t.) 4–2 p. | Beitar Giv'at Ze'ev |
| F.C. Tzeirei Rahat | 4–7 (a.e.t.) | Beitar Ironi Ma'ale Adumim |
| Ironi Modi'in | 2–0 | Hapoel Nahlat Yehuda |
| Maccabi Ironi Netivot | 3–0 | Hapoel Abirei Bat Yam |
Liga Gimel Upper Galilee
| F.C. Julis | 3–2 | Beitar Julis |
| F.C. Maccabi Nahariya | 0–2 | Hapoel Ironi Safed |
| F.C. Sallama Misgav | w/o | Hapoel Bnei Hurfeish |
| Hapoel Nahariya | 3–0 | Hapoel Merom HaGalil |
Liga Gimel Lower Galilee
| F.C. Tzeirei Tamra | 1–4 | F.C. Tzeirei Bir al-Maksur |
| Hapoel Bnei Bi'ina | 3–0 | Ahi Bir al-Maksur |
| Maccabi Bnei Deir Hanna | w/o | Beitar Kafr Kanna |
| Maccabi Ironi Yafa | 3–1 | Hapoel Ironi Bnei I'Billin |
Liga Gimel Jezreel
| Bnei Umm el-Fahm | 0–1 | Hapoel F.C. Sandala Gilboa |
| F.C. Nazareth Illit Hanan Ohayon | 4–0 | Beitar Afula |
| Maccabi Isfiya | 4–0 | Hapoel al-Ittihad Nazareth |
Liga Gimel Shomron
| Maccabi Neve Sha'anan | w/o | Hapoel Ironi Or Akiva |
| F.C. Pardes Hanna-Karkur | 5–0 | F.C. Baqa |
| Hapoel Ahva Haifa | 3–2 | Hapoel Ihud Bnei Jatt |
| Hapoel Halissa | w/o | Ihud Bnei Baqa |
Liga Gimel Sharon
| Beitar Oranit | 2–8 | Hapoel Kafr Qasim Shouaa |
| F.C. Bnei Ra'anana | 6–3 | Hapoel Oranit |
| Beitar Tubruk | 1–0 | F.C. Kafr Qasim Nibrass |
Liga Gimel Central
| Hapoel Ramla | w/o (Note: The IFA awarded Hapoel Ramla a 3–0 win as a result of Hapoel Mevaseret Zion fielding an ineligible player. The match originally ended 2–0 (a.e.t.) to Hapoel Mevaseret Zion.) | Hapoel Mevaseret Zion |
| Hapoel F.C. Hevel Modi'in | 5–1 | Maccabi HaShikma Hen |
| F.C. Beitar Yavne | 2–0 (Note: The IFA ordered a replay as a result of the referee allowing Yavne 5 substitutions (as allowed in Liga Gimel matches, but not in cup matches). The match originally ended 2–1 (a.e.t.) to F.C. Beitar Yavne.) | Hapoel Tirat Shalom |
Liga Gimel Tel Aviv
| F.C. Roei Heshbon Tel Aviv | 1–2 | Hapoel Neve Golan |
| Shikun Vatikim Ramat Gan | 3–4 | A.S. Holon |
| Hapoel Kiryat Shalom | 0–2 | Ironi Beit Dagan |
| Elitzur Yehud | 1–3 | Beitar Ezra |
Liga Gimel South
| Maccabi Segev Shalom | 3–0 | F.C. Arad |
| F.C. Hapoel Yeruham | 5–2 | Bnei al-Salam Rahat |
| F.C. Tzeirei el-Hoshla | 2–5 | Hapoel Tel Sheva |
| F.C. Ashkelon | 3–2 | Hapoel Merhavim |

=== Third round ===
| Home team | Score | Away team |
Liga Bet North A
| Maccabi Ironi Acre | 1–2 (a.e.t.) | Maccabi Sektzia Ma'alot-Tarshiha |
| Ahi Acre | 2–1 | Hapoel Kafr Kanna |
Liga Bet North B
| Hapoel Baqa al-Gharbiyye | 2–2 (a.e.t.) 5–4 p. | Hapoel Iksal |
| Maccabi Ein Mahil Jamel | 0–2 | Maccabi Sulam |
Liga Bet South A
| Hapoel Kiryat Ono | 0–3 | Hapoel Ironi Hod HaSharon |
| Maccabi Kfar Yona | 4–4 (a.e.t.) 2–4 p. | F.C. Bnei Jaffa Ortodoxim |
Liga Bet South B
| F.C. Dimona | 1–4 | Ironi Modi'in |
| Maccabi Ironi Netivot | 4–1 | Beitar Ironi Ma'ale Adumim |

The eight Liga Bet winners qualify to the sixth round.

| Home team | Score | Away team |
Liga Gimel Upper Galilee
| Hapoel Bnei Hurfeish | w/o | Hapoel Ironi Safed |
| Hapoel Nahariya | 2–1 | F.C. Julis |
Liga Gimel Lower Galilee
| F.C. Tzeirei Bir al-Maksur | 3–2 | Beitar Kafr Kanna |
| Hapoel Bnei Bi'ina | 1–5 | Maccabi Ironi Yafa |
Liga Gimel Jezreel
| F.C. al-Nahda Nazareth | 4–1 (Note: The IFA ordered a replay as a result of the referee allowing Al-Nahda 5 substitutions (as allowed in Liga Gimel matches, but not in cup matches). The match originally ended 3–0 to F.C. al-Nahda Nazareth.) | Maccabi Isfiya |
| F.C. Nazareth Illit Hanan Ohayon | 0–1 | Hapoel F.C. Sandala Gilboa |
Liga Gimel Shomron
| F.C. Pardes Hanna-Karkur | 1–0 | Hapoel Ahva Haifa |
| Ihud Bnei Baqa | 6–0 | Maccabi Neve Sha'anan |
Liga Gimel Sharon
| Hapoel Kafr Qasim Shouaa | 4–0 | F.C. Bnei Ra'anana |
| Beitar Tubruk | 0–3 | Hapoel Pardesiya |
Liga Gimel Central
| F.C. Beitar Yavne | 8–0 | F.C. Rishon LeZion |
| Hapoel F.C. Hevel Modi'in | w/o (Note: The IFA awarded Hapoel Ramla a 3–0 win as a result of Hapoel F.C. Hevel Modi'in fielding an ineligible player. The match originally ended 5–2 to Hapoel F.C. Hevel Modi'in.) | Hapoel Ramla |
Liga Gimel Tel Aviv
| A.S. Holon | 1–3 (a.e.t.) | Beitar Ezra |
| Hapoel Neve Golan | 2–3 | Ironi Beit Dagan |
Liga Gimel South
| Maccabi Segev Shalom | 1–4 | F.C. Hapoel Yeruham |
| F.C. Ashkelon | w/o (Note: The IFA awarded F.C. Ashkelon a 3–0 win as a result of Hapoel Tel Sheva fielding an ineligible player. The match originally ended 2–1 to Hapoel Tel Sheva.) | Hapoel Tel Sheva |

=== Fourth round ===
| Home team | Score | Away team |
Liga Bet North A
| Ahi Acre | 0–1 | Maccabi Sektzia Ma'alot-Tarshiha |
Liga Bet North B
| Maccabi Sulam | 0–2 | Hapoel Baqa al-Gharbiyye |
Liga Bet South A
| F.C. Bnei Jaffa Ortodoxim | 0–3 | Hapoel Ironi Hod HaSharon |
Liga Bet South B
| Ironi Modi'in | 2–0 | Maccabi Ironi Netivot |
Liga Gimel Upper Galilee
| Hapoel Nahariya | 2–4 (a.e.t.) | Hapoel Ironi Safed |
Liga Gimel Lower Galilee
| F.C. Tzeirei Bir al-Maksur | 1–3 | Maccabi Ironi Yafa |
Liga Gimel Jezreel
| F.C. al-Nahda Nazareth | 1–0 | Hapoel F.C. Sandala Gilboa |
Liga Gimel Shomron
| Ihud Bnei Baqa | 2–1 (a.e.t.) | F.C. Pardes Hanna-Karkur |
Liga Gimel Sharon
| Hapoel Pardesiya | 1–2 | Hapoel Kafr Qasim Shouaa |
Liga Gimel Central
| F.C. Beitar Yavne | 5–0 | Hapoel Ramla |
Liga Gimel Tel Aviv
| Beitar Ezra | 1–7 | Ironi Beit Dagan |
Liga Gimel South
| F.C. Hapoel Yeruham | 1–0 | F.C. Ashkelon |

=== Fifth round ===
| Home team | Score | Away team |
Liga Alef North
| Ahva Arraba | 1–0 | Maccabi Kafr Kanna |
| Hapoel Ironi Herzliya | 0–2 | Maccabi Daliyat al-Karmel |
| Hapoel Kfar Saba | 4–1 | F.C. Givat Olga |
| Hapoel Hadera | 3–1 | Maccabi Tzur Shalom |
| Maccabi Ironi Kiryat Ata | 3–2 | Hapoel Asi Gilboa |
| Beitar Nahariya | 0–1 | Hapoel Daliyat al-Karmel |
| Hapoel Migdal HaEmek | 2–0 | Ironi Tiberias |
| F.C. Karmiel Safed | 1–3 | Hapoel Beit She'an/Mesilot |
Liga Alef South
| Bnei Eilat | 1–4 | Maccabi Jaffa Kabilio |
| Hapoel Marmorek | 1–2 | Maccabi Sha'arayim |
| Maccabi Be'er Sheva | w/o | Hapoel Mahane Yehuda |
| Hapoel Azor | 1–0 | Maccabi Kiryat Gat |
| Hapoel Kfar Shalem | 1–1 (a.e.t.) 4–2 p. | Beitar Kfar Saba |
| Maccabi Be'er Ya'akov | 1–1 (a.e.t.) 4–5 p. | Maccabi Ironi Bat Yam |
| Maccabi Amishav Petah Tikva | 1–3 | F.C. Kafr Qasim |
| Maccabi Kiryat Malakhi | 1–1 (a.e.t.) 4–3 p. | Sektzia Nes Tziona |

== Nationwide Rounds ==
=== Sixth round ===
| Home team | Score | Away team |
|---|---|---|
| Maccabi Sektzia Ma'alot-Tarshiha | 2–1 | Hapoel Ironi Safed |
| F.C. Hapoel Yeruham | 0–2 | Hapoel Kfar Shalem |
| Hapoel Beit She'an/Mesilot | 1–2 | Hapoel Migdal HaEmek |
| Hapoel Mahane Yehuda | 1–0 | F.C. Bnei Jaffa Ortodoxim |
| F.C. Beitar Yavne | 0–2 (a.e.t.) | Maccabi Ironi Netivot |
| Hapoel Baqa al-Gharbiyye | 1–1 (a.e.t.) 5–4 p. | Maccabi Ironi Kiryat Ata |
| Ironi Modi'in | 0–1 | Maccabi Ironi Bat Yam |
| Hapoel Ironi Hod HaSharon | 0–4 | Maccabi Sha'arayim |
| Ironi Beit Dagan | 0–4 | Maccabi Jaffa Kabilio |
| Maccabi Kiryat Malakhi | 1–3 (a.e.t.) | Hapoel Azor |
| Hapoel Hadera | 4–1 | Ihud Bnei Baqa |
| Hapoel Kfar Saba | 8–0 | Ahi Acre |
| Maccabi Daliyat al-Karmel | 3–2 | Maccabi Sulam |
| Maccabi Ironi Yafa | 2–3 | Hapoel Daliyat al-Karmel |
| F.C. al-Nahda Nazareth | 2–3 (a.e.t.) | Ahva Arraba |
| F.C. Kafr Qasim | 1–0 | Hapoel Kafr Qasim Shouaa |

=== Seventh round ===
The 16 winners from the previous round of the competition join 12 Liga Leumit clubs in this stage of the competition. The other 4 clubs from Liga Leumit received a bye for the next round. These matches will be played on 7 and 8 January 2014.

| 7 January 2014 | Hapoel Mahane Yehuda | 1–3 | Hapoel Petah Tikva | Mahane Yehuda Field, Petah Tikva |
| 13:00 | Levi 67' | Report | Asulin 1', 70'; Fernández 38' |

| 7 January 2014 | Hapoel Azor | 1–2 | Hapoel Nazareth Illit | Azor Stadium, Azor |
| 13:00 | Ben Solomon 76' | Report | Halabi 41'; Diab 67' |

| 7 January 2014 | Hapoel Baqa al-Gharbiyye | 2–1 | Hapoel Migdal HaEmek | Baqa al-Gharbiyye Stadium, Baqa al-Gharbiyye |
| 13:00 | Cohen 3' (pen.), 10' | Report | Jannach 23' (pen.) |

| 7 January 2014 | Maccabi Sektzia Ma'alot-Tarshiha | 3–0 | Hakoah Amidar Ramat Gan | Municipal Stadium, Ma'alot-Tarshiha |
| 13:00 | Tal 32'; Katbi 43'; Tasau 65' | Report |

| 7 January 2014 | Hapoel Hadera | 0–3 | Beitar Tel Aviv Ramla | Hapoel stadium, Hadera |
| 13:00 | | Report | Gilkarov 56'; A. Avinu 58', 64' |

| 7 January 2014 | Hapoel Daliyat al-Karmel | 0–0 (a.e.t.) (1–3 p) | Hapoel Rishon LeZion | Municipal Stadium, Carmel City |
| 13:00 | | Report |

| 7 January 2014 | Maccabi Ironi Bat Yam | 3–0 | Maccabi Jaffa Kabilio | Bat Yam Municipal Stadium, Bat Yam |
| 19:35 | Flicker 67', 73', 79' | Report |

| 7 January 2014 | Maccabi Netanya | 1–0 | Ahva Arraba | Netanya Stadium Netanya |
| 19:40 | Exbard 71' | Report |

| 7 January 2014 | Hapoel Afula | 6–2 | Maccabi Daliyat al-Karmel | Afula Illit Stadium, Afula |
| 19:45 | Hirsh 5', 16', 72', 90'; Simantov 37'; Abra 43' | Report | Amaa 76'; Ben Moha 83' |

| 7 January 2014 | Hapoel Bnei Lod | 2–2 (a.e.t.) (4–3 p) | Maccabi Ironi Netivot | Lod Municipal Stadium, Lod |
| 19:50 | Abbas 74' (pen.); Amsis 105' | Report | Fahima 80'; Bukovza 111' (pen.) |

| 8 January 2014 | Hapoel Jerusalem | 0–1 | F.C. Kafr Qasim | Teddy Stadium, Jerusalem |
| 19:35 | | Report | Sarsur 36' |

| 8 January 2014 | Hapoel Kfar Shalem | 0–1 | Hapoel Katamon | Hatikva Neighborhood Stadium, Tel Aviv |
| 19:40 | | Report | Tzabag 89' |

| 8 January 2014 | Hapoel Ashkelon | 1–2 | Maccabi Sha'arayim | Sala Stadium, Ashkelon |
| 19:45 | Tzagai 73' (pen.) | Report | Shasha 5'; Truaa 27' |

| 8 January 2014 | Maccabi Herzliya | 1–3 | Hapoel Kfar Saba | Herzliya Municipal Stadium, Herzliya |
| 19:50 | S. David 90+4' | Report | Kortva 80', 90'; I. David 85' |

=== Round of 32 ===
| 28 January 2014 | Maccabi Sektzia Ma'alot-Tarshiha | 4–2 | Hapoel Baqa al-Gharbiyye | Ma'alot-Tarshiha |
| 13:00 (IST) | Tal 10' (pen.), 69', 89'; Zaika 30' | Summary; Report (Hebrew) | Dar 47'; Liani 84' (pen.) (red card) 90+2' | Stadium: Municipal Stadium; Attendance: 250; Referee: Nati Dotan |

| 28 January 2014 | Hapoel Kfar Saba | 1–1 (a.e.t.) (4–3 p) | Ahi Nazareth | Kfar Saba |
| 18:15 (IST) | S. Levy 40' | Summary; Report (Hebrew) | Elbaz 87' | Stadium: Levita Stadium; Referee: Tzvika Levi |
| | Penalties |
| | Benish (penalty scored); Askling (penalty scored); Nissim (penalty scored); Ben Shushan (penalty scored) | | (penalty scored) Masudi; (penalty scored) A. Dabour; (penalty scored) El-Khatib; (penalty missed) Suliman; (penalty missed) Abu-Rabia |

| 28 January 2014 | Hapoel Katamon | 0–1 | Hapoel Rishon LeZion | Jerusalem |
| 18:15 (IST) | | Summary; Report (Hebrew) | Brihon 89' | Stadium: Teddy Stadium; Attendance: 600; Referee: Halim Zatma |

| 28 January 2014 | Hapoel Ramat HaSharon | 4–0 | Maccabi Umm al-Fahm | Ramat HaSharon |
| 18:15 (IST) | Sayef 27'; Abu-Laben 31', 54'; Shivhon 45+1' (pen.) | Summary; Report (Hebrew) | | Stadium: Grundman Stadium; Referee: Lilach Asulin Bitton |

| 28 January 2014 | Ironi Kiryat Shmona | 3–0 | Hapoel Acre | Kiryat Shmona |
| 19:00 (IST) | Mizrahi 34'; Kola 70'; Saban 90' (o.g.) | Summary; Report (Hebrew) | | Stadium: Kiryat Shmona Municipal Stadium; Attendance: 150; Referee: Liran Wachsberger |

| 28 January 2014 | Maccabi Petah Tikva | 4–1 | Maccabi Yavne | Petah Tikva |
| 19:00 (IST) | Saba 40', 58' (pen.), 88'; L. Cohen 90+3' | Summary; Report (Hebrew) | Ofir 82' | Stadium: HaMoshava Stadium; Referee: Guy Berger |

| 28 January 2014 | Hapoel Bnei Lod | 3–2 (a.e.t.) | Hapoel Afula | Lod |
| 19:00 (IST) | Abu Siam 10' (pen.); Abu Anza 96'; Amsis 107' | Summary; Report (Hebrew) | Hirsh 90'; Abu Rukon 112' | Stadium: Lod Municipal Stadium; Referee: Oren Siminyan |

| 28 January 2014 | Beitar Tel Aviv Ramla | 0–1 | Hapoel Nazareth Illit | Ramla |
| 19:00 (IST) | | Summary; Report (Hebrew) | Diab 70' | Stadium: Ramla Municipal Stadium; Referee: Liran Liany |

| 28 January 2014 | Hapoel Be'er Sheva | 4–0 | Maccabi Sha'arayim | Be'er Sheva |
| 19:00 (IST) | Falczuk 6', 27'; Nassar 25'; Swisa 66' | Summary; Report (Hebrew) | | Stadium: Vasermil Stadium; Referee: Shalom Ben Avraham |

| 28 January 2014 | Hapoel Ramat Gan | 1–3 (a.e.t.) | Maccabi Netanya | Ramat Gan |
| 19:00 (IST) | Ben Shimon 42'; Hazom (red card) 86'; Lingane (red card) 108' | Summary; Report (Hebrew) | Exbard 23'; Hassan 104'; E. Levi 108' (pen.) | Stadium: Winter Stadium; Attendance: 1,500; Referee: Eli Hachmon |

| 28 January 2014 | F.C. Ashdod | 2–1 (a.e.t.) | Maccabi Tel Aviv | Ashdod |
| 21:00 (IST) | Beckel 45+1' (pen.), 113' (pen.) | Summary; Report (Hebrew) | Zahavi 88'; Ziv (yellow card) 18' (red card) 106' | Stadium: Yud-Alef Stadium; Referee: Alon Yefet |

| 29 January 2014 | Hapoel Petah Tikva | 2–1 | Bnei Yehuda | Petah Tikva |
| 19:00 (IST) | Asulin 5'; Fernández 69' | Summary; Report (Hebrew) | G. Itzhak 26' | Stadium: HaMoshava Stadium; Attendance: 1,700; Referee: Ziv Adler |

| 29 January 2014 | Hapoel Ra'anana | 0–0 (a.e.t.) (8–7 p) | Maccabi Haifa | Netanya |
| 19:00 (IST) | | Summary; Report (Hebrew) | | Stadium: Netanya Stadium; Attendance: 2,000; Referee: Shai Shitrit |
| | Penalties |
| | T. Cohen (penalty missed); Saba'a (penalty missed); Lavi (penalty scored); Mesika (penalty scored); Nwakaeme (penalty scored); Thiam (penalty scored); Nimni (penalty scored); Mbola (penalty scored); Yanko (penalty scored); Lerman (penalty scored) | | (penalty scored) Rayo; (penalty missed) Turgeman; (penalty scored) Abukarat; (penalty scored) Falah; (penalty missed) Keinan; (penalty scored) Katan; (penalty scored) Pylyavskyi; (penalty scored) Weissman; (penalty scored) Vered; (penalty missed) Scheimann |

| 29 January 2014 | F.C. Kafr Qasim | 1–2 | Bnei Sakhnin | Ramat Gan |
| 19:00 (IST) | Sarsur 80' | Summary; Report (Hebrew) | Mugrabi 61'; Kalibat 73' | Stadium: Winter Stadium; Attendance: 3,000; Referee: Roi Reinshreiber |

| 29 January 2014 | Beitar Jerusalem | 2–0 | Maccabi Bat Yam | Jerusalem |
| 19:00 (IST) | Brandán 53'; Kapiloto 67' | Summary; Report (Hebrew) | | Stadium: Teddy Stadium; Attendance: 4,000; Referee: Gal Leibowitz |

| 29 January 2014 | Hapoel Tel Aviv | 1–2 | Hapoel Haifa | Tel Aviv |
| Wednesday 21:00 (IST) | Sasha 67' | Summary; Report (Hebrew) | Lala 1'; Korać 85' (pen.) | Stadium: Bloomfield Stadium; Referee: Guy Berger |

=== Round of 16 ===
| 11 February 2014 | Maccabi Sektzia Ma'alot-Tarshiha | 2–1 | Hapoel Petah Tikva | Ma'alot-Tarshiha |
| 13:00 (IST) | B. Cohen 61'; Tasao 81' | Summary; Report (Hebrew) | Ben Simon 90+2' | Stadium: Municipal Stadium; Attendance: 1,000; Referee: Tzvika Levi |

| 11 February 2014 | Maccabi Netanya | 1–0 | Hapoel Nazareth Illit | Netanya |
| 18:45 (IST) | I. Shriki 22' | Summary; Report (Hebrew) | | Stadium: Netanya Stadium; Attendance: 4,000; Referee: Guy Berger |

| 11 February 2014 | Bnei Sakhnin | 0–1 | Hapoel Rishon LeZion | Sakhnin |
| 18:45 (IST) | | Summary; Report (Hebrew) | Azulay 73' | Stadium: Doha Stadium; Attendance: 1,500; Referee: Liran Liany |

| 11 February 2014 | Hapoel Ramat HaSharon | 1–1 (a.e.t.) (8–7 p) | F.C. Ashdod | Ramat HaSharon |
| 19:30 (IST) | Zandberg 52' | Summary; Report (Hebrew) | Bello 4' (pen.) | Stadium: Grundman Stadium; Attendance: 400; Referee: Daniel Bar-Natan |
| | Penalties |
| | Hadžić (penalty scored); Zandberg (penalty scored); Reichert (penalty scored); Peretz (penalty missed); Mansharov (penalty scored); Sayef (penalty scored); Shitrit (penalty scored); Musa (penalty scored); Ben Yair (penalty scored) | | (penalty scored) Tzarfati; (penalty scored) Beckel; (penalty scored) Ohana; (penalty missed) Verta; (penalty scored) Bello; (penalty scored) Paty; (penalty scored) Avitan; (penalty scored) Oshaniwa; (penalty missed) Elhamed |

| 11 February 2014 | Hapoel Bnei Lod | 0–1 | Beitar Jerusalem | Lod |
| 21:00 (IST) | | Summary; Report (Hebrew) | Azulay 56' | Stadium: Lod Municipal Stadium; Attendance: 3,000; Referee: Orel Greenfeld |

| 12 February 2014 | Hapoel Ra'anana | 1–2 (a.e.t.) | Maccabi Petah Tikva | Netanya |
| 18:50 (IST) | Baldout 45' (pen.) | Summary; Report (Hebrew) | Elbaz 8'; L. Cohen 100' | Stadium: Netanya Stadium |

| 12 February 2014 | Hapoel Haifa | 0–3 | Ironi Kiryat Shmona | Haifa |
| 19:00 (IST) | | Summary; Report (Hebrew) | Kahat 35'; Manga 46'; Amasha 85' (pen.) | Stadium: Kiryat Eliezer Stadium |

| 12 February 2014 | Hapoel Kfar Saba | 0–2 | Hapoel Be'er Sheva | Kfar Saba |
| 21:00 (IST) | | Summary; Report (Hebrew) | Buzaglo 31'; Plet 55' | Stadium: Levita Stadium; Attendance: 4,000 |

=== Quarter-finals ===
| 25 March 2014 | Maccabi Petah Tikva | 8–0 | Maccabi Sektzia Ma'alot-Tarshiha | Petah Tikva |
| 18:45 (IST) | L. Cohen 23', 45', 45+1'; Saba 26', 70'; Merey 48'; Rotković 59', 65' | Summary; Report (Hebrew) | | Stadium: HaMoshava Stadium; Attendance: 1,500; Referee: Liran Wachsberger |

| 25 March 2014 | Maccabi Netanya | 3–0 | Hapoel Ramat HaSharon | Netanya |
| 19:00 (IST) | E. Levy 15' (pen.); Rol 43'; Y. Hassan 57' | Summary; Report (Hebrew) | | Stadium: Netanya Stadium; Attendance: 7,000; Referee: Halim Zatma |

| 25 March 2014 | Hapoel Rishon LeZion | 2–3 | Hapoel Be'er Sheva | Rishon LeZion |
| 19:40 (IST) | Nachum 40'; Martín 66' | Summary; Report (Hebrew) | Gabay 16'; Harel 25'; Barda 82' | Stadium: Haberfeld Stadium; Attendance: 3,500; Referee: Erez Papier |

| 26 March 2014 | Ironi Kiryat Shmona | 2–0 | Beitar Jerusalem | Kiryat Shmona |
| 19:40 (IST) | Kola 79'; Manga 83' | Summary; Report (Hebrew) | Kriaf (red card) 81' | Stadium: Kiryat Shmona Municipal Stadium; Attendance: 5,000; Referee: Menashe Mashiah |

=== Semi-finals ===
| 16 April 2014 | Maccabi Petah Tikva | 1–2 | Maccabi Netanya | Ramat Gan |
| 18:00 (IDT) | Saba 90+2' (pen.) | Summary; Report (Hebrew) | I. Shriki 49'; Kayode 88' | Stadium: Ramat Gan Stadium; Attendance: 20,000; Referee: Orel Greenfeld |

| 16 April 2014 | Ironi Kiryat Shmona | 2–1 | Hapoel Be'er Sheva | Ramat Gan |
| 20:30 (IDT) | Abed 71'; Manga 90+1' | Summary; Report (Hebrew) | Plet 59' | Stadium: Ramat Gan Stadium; Attendance: 31,000; Referee: Alon Yefet |

=== Final ===
| 7 May 2014 | Maccabi Netanya | 0–1 (a.e.t.) | Ironi Kiryat Shmona | Ramat Gan |
| 20:00 (IDT) | | Summary; Report (Hebrew) | Abed 97' | Stadium: Ramat Gan Stadium; Attendance: 30,000; Referee: Menashe Mashiah |
