= 2013–14 Liga Bet =

Israeli football season

The 2013–14 Liga Bet season saw Ihud Bnei Majd al-Krum (champions of the North A division), Ironi Nesher (champions of the North B division), Hapoel Morasha Ramat HaSharon (champions of the South A division) and F.C. Shikun HaMizrach (champions of the South B division) win the title and promotion to Liga Alef.

The clubs ranked 2nd to 5th in each division entered a promotion play-off, at the end of which, in the North section Maccabi Sektzia Ma'alot-Tarshiha and Hapoel Hod HaSharon won against their Liga Alef opponents and were promoted to Liga Alef as well.

At the bottom, F.C. Bnei Arraba (from North A division), F.C. Bu'eine (from North B division), Shimshon Bnei Tayibe (from South A division), and Hapoel Abirei Bat Yam (from South B division) were all automatically relegated to Liga Gimel.

The clubs ranked 12th to 15th in each division entered a relegation play-off, at the end of which Maccabi Tamra (from North A division), Hapoel Isfiya (from North B division), Maccabi HaSharon Netanya (from South A division) and Maccabi Sderot (from South B division) dropped to Liga Gimel as well.

== North A Division ==
Pos	Team	Pld	W	D	L	GF	GA	GD	Pts	Promotion or relegation
1	Ihud Bnei Majd al-Krum	30	22	5	3	64	14	+50	71 (Note: As ranking in Liga Bet is not set by any other criteria other than points, a match was played between Ihud Bnei Majd al-Krum and Hapoel Kafr Kanna to determine which club will be ranked 1st (and thus will be promoted directly to Liga Alef) and which will be ranked 2nd, and will play in the promotion play-offs. In the match, played on 30 April 2014 in a neutral venue, Ilut Stadium, Ihud Bnei Majd al-Krum won 4–3 on penalties and was ranked 1st and promoted.)	Promoted to Liga Alef
2	Hapoel Kafr Kanna	30	22	5	3	64	25	+39	71	Promotion play-offs
3	Maccabi Sektzia Ma'alot-Tarshiha	30	16	4	10	54	31	+23	52	Promotion play-offs
4	F.C. Ahva Kafr Manda	30	15	6	9	45	43	+2	51	Promotion play-offs
5	Hapoel Shefa-'Amr	30	15	4	11	54	52	+2	49	Promotion play-offs
6	Bnei Kabul	30	13	5	12	37	33	+4	44	
7	Hapoel Bu'eine	30	13	5	12	47	42	+5	44	
8	Hapoel Kaukab	30	12	2	16	35	48	−13	37 (Note: 1 point deducted.)	
9	Beitar Haifa	30	11	4	15	53	62	−9	37	
10	Maccabi Acre	30	10	7	13	42	46	−4	37	
11	Ahi Acre	30	10	6	14	43	47	−4	36	
12	Hapoel Ihud Bnei Sumei	30	10	5	15	45	58	−13	35	Relegation play-offs
13	Bnei Maghar	30	10	5	15	43	49	−6	35	Relegation play-offs
14	Maccabi Tamra	30	7	8	15	32	55	−23	29	Relegation play-offs
15	Hapoel Sakhnin	30	7	5	18	28	61	−33	26	Relegation play-offs
16	F.C. Bnei Arraba	30	7	4	19	27	47	−20	25	Relegated to Liga Gimel

== North B Division ==
Pos	Team	Pld	W	D	L	GF	GA	GD	Pts	Promotion or relegation
1	Ironi Nesher	28	20	3	5	64	27	+37	63	Promoted to Liga Alef
2	Hapoel Baqa al-Gharbiyye	28	19	5	4	73	30	+43	62	Promotion play-offs
3	Hapoel Iksal	28	18	5	5	57	28	+29	59	Promotion play-offs
4	Maccabi Ahi Iksal	28	17	4	7	49	40	+9	55	Promotion play-offs
5	Maccabi Kafr Qara	28	13	7	8	46	33	+13	46	Promotion play-offs
6	Maccabi Sulam	28	10	9	9	42	34	+8	39	
7	Maccabi Ein Mahil	28	10	5	13	40	45	−5	35	
8	Hapoel Umm al-Fahm	28	9	7	12	29	35	−6	34	
9	F.C. Daburiyya	28	9	7	12	41	39	+2	34	
10	Bnei Nujeidat	28	9	5	14	42	50	−8	32	
11	Hapoel Ramot Menashe Megiddo	28	8	6	14	38	48	−10	30	
12	Hapoel Isfiya	28	8	5	15	34	51	−17	29	Relegation play-offs
13	F.C. Tzeirei Tur'an	28	7	6	15	34	48	−14	27	Relegation play-offs
14	Hapoel Yoqneam	28	7	5	16	44	67	−23	26	Relegation play-offs
15	Hapoel Umm al-Ghanem Nein	28	5	3	20	30	88	−58	18	Relegation play-offs

F.C. Bu'eine was dismissed from the league, demoted to Liga Gimel and its results were nullified.

== South A Division ==
Pos	Team	Pld	W	D	L	GF	GA	GD	Pts	Promotion or relegation
1	Hapoel Morasha Ramat HaSharon	30	22	5	3	82	31	+51	71	Promoted to Liga Alef
2	Hapoel Hod HaSharon	30	20	7	3	79	28	+51	67	Promotion play-offs
3	Maccabi Kfar Yona	30	19	2	9	72	44	+28	59	Promotion play-offs
4	Hapoel Kiryat Ono	30	15	6	9	55	42	+13	51	Promotion play-offs
5	Hapoel Bik'at HaYarden	30	14	9	7	55	30	+25	51	Promotion play-offs
6	Beitar Ramat Gan	30	13	10	7	50	38	+12	49	
7	F.C. Tira	30	13	9	8	51	44	+7	48	
8	Hapoel Ramat Israel	30	14	4	12	64	61	+3	46	
9	F.C. Bnei Jaffa Ortodoxim	30	12	5	13	58	47	+11	41	
10	Otzma F.C. Holon	30	12	2	16	55	64	−9	38	
11	Maccabi Bnei Jaljulia	30	11	5	14	57	68	−11	38	
12	F.C. Ironi Or Yehuda	30	8	9	13	44	49	−5	33	Relegation play-offs
13	Beitar Petah Tikva	30	7	6	17	43	66	−23	27	Relegation play-offs
14	Tzafririm Holon	30	6	6	18	37	57	−20	24	Relegation play-offs
15	Maccabi HaSharon Netanya	30	5	3	22	40	90	−50	18	Relegation play-offs
16	Shimshon Bnei Tayibe	30	2	6	22	31	114	−83	12	Relegated to Liga Gimel

== South B Division ==
Pos	Team	Pld	W	D	L	GF	GA	GD	Pts	Promotion or relegation
1	F.C. Shikun HaMizrach	30	19	7	4	57	24	+33	64	Promoted to Liga Alef
2	Maccabi Netivot	30	19	5	6	70	29	+41	62	Promotion play-offs
3	Beitar Giv'at Ze'ev	30	17	7	6	71	31	+40	58	Promotion play-offs
4	Ironi Modi'in	30	16	9	5	74	39	+35	57	Promotion play-offs
5	Hapoel Rahat	30	17	4	9	60	43	+17	54 (Note: 1 point deducted?)	Promotion play-offs
6	F.C. Dimona	30	14	7	9	58	44	+14	49	
7	Hapoel Nahlat Yehuda	30	14	5	11	55	45	+10	47	
8	Moadon Tzeirei Rahat	30	11	6	13	51	70	−19	39	
9	F.C. Be'er Sheva	30	12	2	16	56	65	−9	38	
10	Bnei Yichalel Rehovot	30	11	4	15	43	44	−1	37	
11	F.C. Tzeirei Tayibe	30	9	10	11	41	40	+1	37	
12	Ironi Beit Shemesh	30	10	5	15	45	47	−2	35	Relegation play-offs
13	Hapoel Arad	30	9	4	17	35	54	−19	31	Relegation play-offs
14	Beitar Ma'ale Adumim	30	7	7	16	38	66	−28	28	Relegation play-offs
15	Maccabi Sderot	30	8	3	19	41	64	−23	27	Relegation play-offs
16	Hapoel Abirei Bat Yam	30	4	1	25	36	126	−90	13	Relegated to Liga Gimel

== Promotion play-offs ==
=== Northern Divisions ===
Division semi-finals
2	Hapoel Kafr Kanna	1
5	Hapoel Shefa-'Amr	4
North A division
3	Sektzia Ma'alot-Tarshiha	0 (5)
4	F.C. Ahva Kafr Manda	0 (4)
2	Hapoel Baqa al-Gharbiyye	2
5	Maccabi Kafr Qara	1
North B division
3	Hapoel Iksal	0
4	Maccabi Ahi Iksal	1

Division final
5	Hapoel Shefa-'Amr	1
3	Sektzia Ma'alot-Tarshiha	2
2	Hapoel Baqa al-Gharbiyye	2
4	Maccabi Ahi Iksal	4

Regional final
3NA	Sektzia Ma'alot-Tarshiha	3
4NB	Maccabi Ahi Iksal	1

Maccabi Sektzia Ma'alot-Tarshiha qualified to the promotion play-off match against 14th ranked club in Liga Alef North division, Hapoel Daliyat al-Karmel.

==== Promotion play-off Match ====
15 May 2014	Hapoel Daliyat al-Karmel	0–0 (a.e.t.) (5–6 p)	Maccabi Sektzia Ma'alot-Tarshiha	Ilut Stadium
16:30 UTC+3		Report		Referee: Arbeli
	Penalties
	El-Ali (penalty scored); Tweel (penalty scored); Tatur (penalty scored); Atma (penalty scored); Naser el-Din (penalty missed); Zeitun (penalty scored); Al-Kara (penalty missed)		(penalty scored) Tal; (penalty scored) De Kalbo; (penalty scored) Edri; (penalty missed) Zaika; (penalty scored) Levi; (penalty scored) Huari; (penalty scored) Ajam

Maccabi Sektzia Ma'alot-Tarshiha Promoted to Liga Alef; Hapoel Daliyat al-Karmel relegated to Liga Bet.

=== Southern Divisions ===
Division semi-finals
2	Hapoel Hod HaSharon	2
5	Hapoel Bik'at HaYarden	0
South A division
3	Maccabi Kfar Yona	4
4	Hapoel Kiryat Ono	2
2	Maccabi Netivot	1 (2)
5	Hapoel Rahat	1 (4)
South B division
3	Beitar Giv'at Ze'ev	0
4	Ironi Modi'in	1

Division final
2	Hapoel Hod HaSharon	3
3	Maccabi Kfar Yona	0
5	Hapoel Rahat	1
4	Ironi Modi'in	0

Regional final
2SA	Hapoel Hod HaSharon	2
5SB	Hapoel Rahat	1

Hapoel Hod HaSharon qualified to the promotion play-off match against 14th ranked club in Liga Alef South division, Maccabi Be'er Sheva.

=== Relegation/promotion match ===
14 May 2014	Maccabi Be'er Sheva	0–1	Hapoel Hod HaSharon	Ramat Gan Stadium
18:00 UTC+3		Report	Menachem 89'	Referee: Hacmon

Hapoel Hod HaSharon Promoted to Liga Alef; Maccabi Be'er Sheva relegated to Liga Bet. However, they were eventually reprieved from relegation, after Ironi Bat Yam, which have finished 12th in Liga Alef South, folded during the summer.

== Relegation play-offs ==
=== Northern divisions ===
North A division

Semi-finals
12	Ihud Bnei Sumei	5
15	Hapoel Sakhnin	0
13	Bnei Maghar	4
14	Maccabi Tamra	0

Final
15	Hapoel Sakhnin	1
14	Maccabi Tamra	0

Maccabi Tamra relegated to Liga Gimel

North B division

Semi-finals
12	Hapoel Isfiya	2
15	Hapoel Umm al-Ghanem Nein	3
13	F.C. Tzeirei Tur'an	1
14	Hapoel Yoqneam	2

Final
12	Hapoel Isfiya	0
13	F.C. Tzeirei Tur'an	1

Hapoel Isfiya relegated to Liga Gimel

=== Southern divisions ===
South A division

Semi-finals
12	Ironi Or Yehuda	1
15	HaSharon Netanya	0
13	Beitar Petah Tikva	2
14	Tzafririm Holon	4

Final
15	HaSharon Netanya	2 (2)
13	Beitar Petah Tikva	2 (4)

HaSharon Netanya relegated to Liga Gimel

South B division

Semi-finals
12	Ironi Beit Shemesh	0 (4)
15	Maccabi Sderot	0 (2)
13	Hapoel Arad	1
14	Beitar Ma'ale Adumim	2

Final
15	Maccabi Sderot	1
13	Hapoel Arad	3

Maccabi Sderot relegated to Liga Gimel
