= 2007–08 Liga Gimel =

Israeli football season

The 2007–08 Liga Gimel season saw 86 clubs competing in 6 regional divisions for promotion to Liga Bet.

== Upper Galilee Division ==
Pos	Team	Pld	W	D	L	GF	GA	GD	Pts	Promotion
1	Hapoel Kaukab	28	23	5	0	107	13	+94	74	Promoted to Liga Bet
2	Beitar Nahariya	28	23	3	2	112	22	+90	72	Promoted to Liga Bet
3	Hapoel Deir al-Asad	28	23	2	3	85	20	+65	71	Promoted to Liga Bet
4	Hapoel Nahariya	28	17	5	6	70	28	+42	56	Promoted to Liga Bet
5	Hapoel Bnei Gush Halav	28	17	3	8	70	31	+39	54	
6	Beitar Abu Snan	28	14	4	10	61	60	+1	46	
7	Maccabi Ein Mahil	28	14	3	11	54	56	−2	45	
8	Bnei Hurfeish	28	10	4	14	46	67	−21	34	
9	Hapoel Kisra	28	10	1	17	32	63	−31	27 (Note: 4 points deducted.)	
10	Beitar Makr	28	8	5	15	49	74	−25	26 (Note: 3 points deducted.)	
11	Beitar Ma'alot	27	8	2	17	50	104	−54	26 (Note: The match between Beitar Ma'alot and Maccabi Bnei Reineh was annulled and wasn't replayed, so each of team finished the season with 27 matches.)	
12	Ironi Bnei Kabul	28	6	4	18	29	72	−43	22	
13	Hapoel Ironi Hatzor	28	6	4	18	32	69	−37	14 (Note: 8 points deducted.)	
14	Maccabi Bnei Reineh	27	3	2	22	23	81	−58	11	
15	Hapoel Jatt Yanuh HaGlilit	28	3	1	24	18	78	−60	6	

== Jezreel Division ==
Pos	Team	Pld	W	D	L	GF	GA	GD	Pts	Promotion
1	Hapoel Umm al-Ghanam/Nein	30	25	2	3	94	24	+70	74 (Note: 3 points deducted.)	Promoted to Liga Bet
2	Hapoel Ramot Menashe Megiddo	30	24	2	4	105	17	+88	74	Promoted to Liga Bet
3	Hapoel Shefa-'Amr	30	22	4	4	86	28	+58	70	
4	Maccabi Nazareth Illit	30	21	3	6	63	24	+39	66	
5	Hapoel Kafr Sulam	30	18	4	8	86	57	+29	58	
6	Beitar Afula	30	16	8	6	69	40	+29	56	
7	F.C. Kfar Kama	30	16	5	9	72	34	+38	53	
8	Hapoel Tel Hanan	30	11	5	14	62	62	0	36 (Note: 2 points deducted.)	
9	Hapoel al-Ittihad Nazareth	30	10	5	15	44	64	−20	35	
10	Hapoel Spartak Haifa	30	11	2	17	63	66	−3	29 (Note: 6 point deducted.)	
11	Maccabi Bnei Ilut	30	8	3	19	38	62	−24	25	
12	Maccabi Daliyat al-Karmel	30	7	3	20	31	72	−41	24	
13	Beitar F.C. Tabash	30	6	6	18	26	54	−28	23 (Note: 1 point deducted?)	
14	Hapoel Bnei Nazareth	30	5	7	18	41	77	−36	22	
15	Hapoel Ka'abiyye	30	6	3	21	31	91	−60	21	
16	Beitar al-Amal Nazareth	30	2	2	26	26	165	−139	8	

== Samaria Division ==
Pos	Team	Pld	W	D	L	GF	GA	GD	Pts	Promotion
1	Maccabi Ironi Jatt	22	16	5	1	71	13	+58	53	Promoted to Liga Bet
2	Hapoel Bnei Jisr az-Zarqa	22	15	7	0	58	11	+47	52	
3	Maccabi Ahi Iksal	22	14	6	2	62	25	+37	48	
4	Hapoel Bnei Musmus	22	13	4	5	49	23	+26	43	
5	F.C. Bnei Qalansawe	22	10	7	5	56	33	+23	37	
6	Maccabi Fureidis	22	7	4	11	29	35	−6	25	
7	Maccabi Neve Sha'anan	22	6	5	11	37	47	−10	23	
8	Hapoel Bnei Zemer	22	6	4	12	37	68	−31	22	
9	Hapoel Muawiya	22	4	5	13	15	40	−25	17	
10	Maccabi Jisr az-Zarqa	22	4	4	14	26	59	−33	16	
11	Beitar Hadera	22	6	1	15	26	77	−51	13 (Note: 6 point deducted.)	
12	Beitar Umm al-Fahm	22	4	2	16	13	48	−35	7 (Note: 7 points deducted.)	

== Sharon Division ==
Pos	Team	Pld	W	D	L	GF	GA	GD	Pts	Promotion
1	Maccabi HaSharon Netanya	26	24	0	2	77	16	+61	72	Promoted to Liga Bet
2	F.C. Bnei Ra'anana	26	19	3	4	72	25	+47	60	
3	Beitar Petah Tikva	26	14	7	5	43	26	+17	49	
4	Maccabi Bnei Jaljulia	26	15	3	8	50	28	+22	48	
5	Ironi Ariel	26	13	7	6	42	33	+9	46	
6	F.C. Tel Mond	26	11	5	10	46	46	0	38	
7	Hapoel Kafr Qasim Shouaa	26	10	6	10	35	39	−4	35 (Note: 1 point deducted.)	
8	Hapoel Aliyah Kfar Saba	26	9	5	12	49	39	+10	32	
9	Beitar Ironi Ariel	26	7	8	11	38	52	−14	29	
10	Beitar Oranit	26	7	4	15	35	58	−23	25	
11	Hapoel Kafr Bara	26	7	4	15	34	56	−22	25	
12	F.C. Tira	26	6	3	17	39	76	−37	21	
13	Hapoel Bik'at HaYarden	26	5	4	17	31	49	−18	18	
14	Beitar Tubruk	26	5	1	20	35	83	−48	16	

== Tel Aviv Division ==
Pos	Team	Pld	W	D	L	GF	GA	GD	Pts	Promotion
1	Maccabi Ironi Or Yehuda	28	23	3	2	99	26	+73	72	Promoted to Liga Bet
2	Hapoel Kiryat Ono	28	22	5	1	116	22	+94	71	
3	Ironi Beit Dagan	28	22	1	5	95	42	+53	67	
4	Hapoel Kiryat Shalom	28	16	3	9	74	41	+33	51	
5	Hapoel Ihud Bnei Jaffa	28	16	4	8	83	30	+53	50 (Note: 2 points deducted.)	
6	Bnei Yehud	28	14	5	9	60	50	+10	45	
7	Beitar Jaffa	28	13	6	9	52	50	+2	45	
8	Hapoel Neve Golan	28	11	4	13	61	61	0	37	
9	A.S. Holon	28	8	4	16	44	84	−40	28	
10	Maccabi Dynamo Holon	28	8	5	15	40	67	−27	27	
11	Elitzur Jaffa Tel Aviv	28	6	5	17	45	92	−47	23	
12	Elitzur Yehud	28	5	8	15	35	61	−26	23	
13	Hapoel Ramla	28	5	7	16	48	75	−27	21 (Note: 1 point deducted.)	
14	Brit Sport Ma'of	28	5	3	20	49	110	−61	18	
15	Beitar Ezra	28	4	1	23	33	123	−90	13	

== Central Division ==
Pos	Team	Pld	W	D	L	GF	GA	GD	Pts	Promotion
1	Hapoel F.C. Ortodoxim Lod	26	20	3	3	90	22	+68	63	Promoted to Liga Bet
2	F.C. Shikun HaMizrach	26	19	2	5	74	20	+54	59	Promoted to Liga Bet
3	Hapoel F.C. Hevel Modi'in	26	18	5	3	62	28	+34	59	Promoted to Liga Bet
4	Hapoel Hura	26	15	2	9	41	35	+6	47	
5	Hapoel Rahat	26	14	5	7	57	31	+26	47	
6	Beitar Ashkelon	26	13	2	11	57	36	+21	41	
7	Tzeirei Al-Huzeil	26	10	7	9	42	45	−3	37	
8	Ironi Beit Shemesh	26	11	3	12	34	37	−3	34 (Note: 2 points deducted.)	
9	Bnei Yichalel Rehovot	26	9	4	13	46	56	−10	31	
10	Maccabi Lod	26	8	3	15	38	65	−27	25	
11	Maccabi Kiryat Ekron	26	6	4	16	32	67	−35	22	
12	F.C. Rishon LeZion	26	5	6	15	32	69	−37	21	
13	Maccabi Rehovot	26	6	1	19	28	62	−34	19	
14	Hapoel Bnei Beit Safafa	26	2	5	19	23	83	−60	11	
