= 2013–14 Liga Gimel =

Israeli football season

The 2013–14 Liga Gimel season saw 113 clubs competing in 8 regional divisions for promotion to Liga Bet.

Hapoel Ironi Safed (Upper Galilee), Maccabi Ironi Yafa (Lower Galilee), F.C. al-Nahda Nazareth (Jezreel), F.C. Baqa (Samaria), Hapoel Kafr Qasim Shouaa (Sharon), F.C. Roei Heshbon Tel Aviv (Tel Aviv), F.C. Beitar Yavne (Central) and Hapoel Merhavim (South) all won their respective divisions and were promoted to Liga Bet.

During the summer, as several vacancies were created in Liga Bet, runners-up Hapoel Ironi Bnei I'billin (Lower Galilee), Hapoel Sandala Gilboa (Jezreel), F.C. Pardes Hanna-Karkur (Samaria), F.C. Bnei Ra'anana (Sharon) and A.S. Holon (Tel Aviv) were also promoted to Liga Bet.

== Upper Galilee Division ==
Pos	Team	Pld	W	D	L	GF	GA	GD	Pts	Promotion
1	Hapoel Ironi Safed	28	23	1	4	72	16	+56	70	Promoted to Liga Bet
2	Maccabi Bnei Nahf	28	21	2	5	57	28	+29	64 (Note: 1 point deducted.)	
3	F.C. Maccabi Nahariya	28	15	5	8	70	53	+17	50	
4	Maccabi Ahva Yarka	28	15	3	10	62	50	+12	48	
5	Hapoel Bnei Rameh	28	14	6	8	82	57	+25	48	
6	Hapoel Bnei Peki'in	28	15	2	11	68	53	+15	47	
7	F.C. Julis	28	14	4	10	60	52	+8	46	
8	F.C. Sallama Misgav	28	12	4	12	41	46	−5	39	
9	Hapoel Nahariya	28	9	6	13	53	54	−1	33	
10	F.C. Hatzor HaGlilit	28	9	6	13	51	62	−11	33	
11	Hapoel Bnei Hurfeish	28	7	6	15	44	65	−21	27	
12	Hapoel Merom HaGalil	28	6	9	13	37	65	−28	27	
13	Merkaz Kehilati Golan Katzrin	28	7	5	16	36	59	−23	26	
14	F.C. Aramshe Danun	28	5	3	20	46	81	−35	17	
15	Hapoel Tarshiha	28	5	2	21	39	77	−38	17	

== Lower Galilee Division ==
Pos	Team	Pld	W	D	L	GF	GA	GD	Pts	Promotion
1	Maccabi Ironi Yafa	24	21	2	1	85	15	+70	65	Promoted to Liga Bet
2	Hapoel Ironi Bnei I'billin	24	20	2	2	69	31	+38	62	Promoted to Liga Bet
3	F.C. Tzeirei Bir al-Maksur	24	14	4	6	57	28	+29	46	
4	Ahi Bir al-Maksur	24	14	4	6	57	38	+19	46	
5	F.C. Tzeirei Tamra	24	13	5	6	56	37	+19	44	
6	Beitar Kafr Kanna	24	10	3	11	65	65	0	33	
7	F.C. Kfar Kama	24	10	2	12	68	63	+5	32	
8	Maccabi Bnei Deir Hanna	24	9	2	13	49	56	−7	29	
9	Hapoel Bnei Bi'ina	24	8	1	15	38	67	−29	25	
10	Maccabi Kafr Manda	24	6	3	15	38	58	−20	21	
11	Beitar Ein Mahil	24	4	5	15	29	74	−45	17	
12	Ironi Bnei Sha'ab	24	6	0	18	40	68	−28	16 (Note: 2 points deducted.)	
13	Bnei Kafr Yasif	24	4	1	19	20	71	−51	12 (Note: 1 point deducted.)	

Notes:

During the season, Hapoel Bnei Jadeidi-Makr and Hapoel Bnei Makr (after 17 matches) both folded and their results were annulled.

== Jezreel Division ==
Pos	Team	Pld	W	D	L	GF	GA	GD	Pts	Promotion
1	Al Nahda Nazareth	26	22	2	2	89	23	+66	68	Promoted to Liga Bet
2	Hapoel Sandala Gilboa	26	21	5	0	74	13	+61	68	Promoted to Liga Bet
3	F.C. Nazareth Illit Hanan Ohayon	26	17	2	7	73	25	+48	53	
4	Maccabi Isfiya	26	15	4	7	82	41	+41	49	
5	Hapoel Bnei Zalafa	26	14	4	8	68	34	+34	46	
6	Beitar Afula	26	13	3	10	60	48	+12	42	
7	Hapoel al-Ittihad Nazareth	26	13	2	11	67	47	+20	41	
8	Hapoel Kafr Qara	26	12	3	11	54	42	+12	39	
9	Bnei Umm al-Fahm	26	10	5	11	43	38	+5	34 (Note: 1 point deducted.)	
10	Beitar Umm al-Fahm	26	10	3	13	46	56	−10	33	
11	Hapoel Ka'abiyye	26	8	1	17	50	79	−29	25	
12	Maccabi Ironi Barta'a	26	6	2	18	35	72	−37	19	
13	Beitar el-Amal Nazareth	26	1	1	24	26	130	−104	4	
14	Hapoel Bnei Nazareth	26	1	1	24	20	139	−119	1 (Note: 3 points deducted.)	

Notes:

After playing one match, Hapoel Muawiya folded and their result was annulled.

== Samaria Division ==
Pos	Team	Pld	W	D	L	GF	GA	GD	Pts	Promotion
1	F.C. Baqa	28	24	3	1	97	13	+84	75	Promoted to Liga Bet
2	F.C. Pardes Hanna-Karkur	28	21	3	4	95	24	+71	66	Promoted to Liga Bet
3	Beitar Pardes Hanna	28	19	3	6	82	28	+54	60	
4	Ihud Bnei Baqa	28	19	1	8	85	44	+41	58	
5	Hapoel Ihud Bnei Jatt	28	14	3	11	70	40	+30	45	
6	Hapoel Ahva Haifa	28	14	3	11	55	42	+13	45	
7	Hapoel Tirat HaCarmel	28	12	8	8	59	43	+16	44	
8	Beitar Hadera	28	12	5	11	61	55	+6	41	
9	Maccabi Ironi Tirat HaCarmel	28	12	4	12	64	54	+10	40	
10	Hapoel Spartak Haifa	28	11	3	14	69	76	−7	36	
11	Hapoel Bnei Fureidis	28	13	2	13	46	75	−29	32 (Note: 9 points deducted.)	
12	Maccabi Moria	28	7	3	18	42	76	−34	24	
13	Maccabi Neve Sha'anan Eldad	28	4	3	21	32	102	−70	15	
14	Hapoel Ironi Or Akiva	28	4	1	23	38	123	−85	12 (Note: 1 point deducted.)	
15	Hapoel Khalisa	28	1	1	26	25	125	−100	3	

== Sharon Division ==
Pos	Team	Pld	W	D	L	GF	GA	GD	Pts	Promotion
1	Hapoel Kafr Qasim Shouaa	28	26	1	1	110	18	+92	79	Promoted to Liga Bet
2	F.C. Bnei Ra'anana	28	23	2	3	105	42	+63	71	Promoted to Liga Bet
3	Hapoel Pardesiya	28	22	3	3	100	29	+71	69	
4	Beitar Tubruk	28	17	4	7	73	37	+36	55	
5	Hapoel Oranit	28	16	4	8	83	52	+31	52	
6	Shimshon Kafr Qasim	28	16	2	10	62	47	+15	50	
7	Hapoel Kafr Bara	28	14	3	11	61	53	+8	45	
8	F.C. Bnei Qalansawe	28	13	4	11	63	45	+18	43	
9	Hapoel Jaljulia	28	12	1	15	57	60	−3	37	
10	F.C. Netanya	28	9	1	18	47	89	−42	28	
11	Beitar Ironi Ariel	28	8	1	19	47	106	−59	25	
12	Beitar Oranit	28	6	4	18	41	72	−31	22	
13	Hapoel Aliyah Kfar Saba	28	6	1	21	35	96	−61	18 (Note: 1 point deducted.)	
14	Hapoel Tzeirei Qalansawe	28	2	4	22	37	82	−45	10	
15	F.C. Kafr Qasim Nibrass	28	2	1	25	22	115	−93	7	

== Tel Aviv Division ==
Pos	Team	Pld	W	D	L	GF	GA	GD	Pts	Promotion
1	F.C. Roei Heshbon Tel Aviv	30	24	1	5	81	22	+59	73	Promoted to Liga Bet
2	A.S. Holon	30	23	2	5	115	38	+77	71	Promoted to Liga Bet
3	Shikun Vatikim Ramat Gan	30	20	4	6	79	32	+47	64	
4	Hapoel F.C. Givat Shmuel	30	18	6	6	84	34	+50	60	
5	Ironi Beit Dagan	30	18	2	10	79	51	+28	56	
6	Hapoel Kiryat Shalom	30	17	4	9	97	53	+44	55	
7	Elitzur Jaffa Tel Aviv	30	16	4	10	114	71	+43	52	
8	Hapoel Neve Golan	30	14	4	12	83	65	+18	46	
9	Bnei Yehud	30	14	3	13	90	75	+15	45	
10	F.C. Mahanaim Ramat Gan	30	12	4	14	78	72	+6	40	
11	Maccabi Ironi Or Yehuda	30	10	3	17	47	65	−18	33	
12	Beitar Jaffa	30	9	4	17	47	65	−18	31	
13	Beitar Ezra	30	9	3	18	66	105	−39	30	
14	Elitzur Yehud	30	6	5	19	67	104	−37	23	
15	Maccabi Pardes Katz	30	3	2	25	49	155	−106	11	
16	Brit Sport Ma'of	30	1	1	28	34	203	−169	4	

== Central Division ==
Pos	Team	Pld	W	D	L	GF	GA	GD	Pts	Promotion
1	F.C. Beitar Yavne	20	18	1	1	67	16	+51	55	Promoted to Liga Bet
2	Maccabi HaShikma Hen	20	13	3	4	47	25	+22	42	
3	Hapoel F.C. Hevel Modi'in	20	13	3	4	66	30	+36	42	
4	Maccabi Rehovot	20	8	3	9	44	35	+9	27	
5	Hapoel Mevaseret Zion	20	9	0	11	42	48	−6	26 (Note: 1 point deducted.)	
6	Hapoel Ramla	20	7	4	9	31	43	−12	25	
7	Maccabi Spartak Ramat Gan	20	8	0	12	37	49	−12	24	
8	Hapoel Matzliah	20	6	6	8	35	43	−8	24	
9	Hapoel Ironi Gedera	20	5	5	10	31	42	−11	20	
10	Hapoel Tirat Shalom	20	6	1	13	23	52	−29	19	
11	F.C. Rishon LeZion	20	3	2	15	31	71	−40	11	

== South Division ==
Pos	Team	Pld	W	D	L	GF	GA	GD	Pts	Promotion
1	Hapoel Merhavim	20	15	3	2	55	16	+39	48	Promoted to Liga Bet
2	F.C. Ashkelon	20	15	2	3	64	14	+50	47	
3	Hapoel Tel Sheva	20	14	3	3	59	17	+42	44 (Note: 1 point deducted.)	
4	Maccabi Segev Shalom	20	11	5	4	46	33	+13	38	
5	F.C. Hapoel Yeruham	20	12	1	7	42	34	+8	37	
6	Bnei al-Salam	20	11	1	8	57	39	+18	34	
7	F.C. Be'er Sheva Haim Levi	20	10	0	10	44	48	−4	30	
8	Hapoel Tzeirei al-Mahdi	20	4	3	13	32	55	−23	15	
9	F.C. Tzeirei al-Hoshla	20	3	2	15	34	70	−36	11	
10	F.C. Arad	20	2	1	17	20	67	−47	7	
11	F.C. Ironi Kuseife	20	2	1	17	24	84	−60	6	
