= 2009–10 Liga Gimel =

Israeli football season

The 2009–10 Liga Gimel season saw 91 clubs competing in 7 regional divisions for promotion to Liga Bet. This was the first season since 1998–99 that Liga Gimel was the fifth tier in the Israeli football league system.

Hapoel Shefa-'Amr (Upper Galilee), F.C. Kfar Kama (Jezreel), F.C. Givat Olga (Samaria), Maccabi Bnei Jaljulia (Sharon), Hapoel Oranit (Tel Aviv), Bnei Yichalel Rehovot (Central) and Hapoel Katamon Jerusalem (South) all won their respective divisions and were promoted to Liga Bet.

During the summer, as several vacancies were created in Liga Bet, runners-up Bnei Kabul (Upper Galilee) and Maccabi Daliyat al-Karmel (Samaria) were also promoted to Liga Bet, as well as third-placed Ironi Nesher (Samaria).

== Upper Galilee Division ==
| Pos | Team | Pld | W | D | L | GF | GA | GD | Pts | Promotion |
|---|---|---|---|---|---|---|---|---|---|---|
| 1 | Hapoel Shefa-'Amr | 30 | 26 | 3 | 1 | 92 | 6 | +86 | 81 | Promoted to Liga Bet |
| 2 | Bnei Kabul | 30 | 24 | 3 | 3 | 75 | 17 | +58 | 75 | Promoted to Liga Bet |
| 3 | Bnei Maghar | 30 | 23 | 5 | 2 | 77 | 26 | +51 | 74 | |
| 4 | F.C. Bnei Arraba | 30 | 18 | 2 | 10 | 68 | 37 | +31 | 56 | |
| 5 | F.C. Tzeirei Tur'an | 30 | 16 | 7 | 7 | 77 | 42 | +35 | 55 | |
| 6 | F.C. Otzma Bnei Yarka | 30 | 17 | 3 | 10 | 79 | 52 | +27 | 54 | |
| 7 | Maccabi Tzeirei Shefa-'Amr | 30 | 15 | 3 | 12 | 75 | 52 | +23 | 48 | |
| 8 | Hapoel Bnei Rameh | 30 | 11 | 4 | 15 | 58 | 59 | −1 | 37 | |
| 9 | Maccabi Tuba Zangariyye | 30 | 10 | 7 | 13 | 46 | 51 | −5 | 36 (Note: 1 point deducted.) | |
| 10 | Beitar Kafr Kanna | 30 | 10 | 5 | 15 | 67 | 83 | −16 | 35 | |
| 11 | Alpha Ironi Safed | 30 | 7 | 10 | 13 | 44 | 60 | −16 | 31 | |
| 12 | Hapoel Deir al-Asad | 30 | 8 | 4 | 18 | 38 | 80 | −42 | 28 | |
| 13 | Maccabi Bnei Nahf | 30 | 6 | 5 | 19 | 40 | 72 | −32 | 23 | |
| 14 | Maccabi Sha'ab | 30 | 5 | 4 | 21 | 35 | 94 | −59 | 18 | |
| 15 | Hapoel Jatt HaGlilit | 30 | 5 | 3 | 22 | 29 | 96 | −67 | 18 | |
| 16 | Hapoel Bnei Bi'ina | 22 | 2 | 0 | 20 | 17 | 76 | −59 | 5 | |

Notes:

Bnei Kabul competed with Maccabi Daliyat al-Karmel from the Samaria division for a vacant spot in Liga Bet, and lost the match 1–3. After the match another spot became available in Liga Bet, and Bnei Kabul was promoted as well.

== Jezreel Division ==
| Pos | Team | Pld | W | D | L | GF | GA | GD | Pts | Promotion |
|---|---|---|---|---|---|---|---|---|---|---|
| 1 | F.C. Kfar Kama | 26 | 22 | 3 | 1 | 74 | 17 | +57 | 69 | Promoted to Liga Bet |
| 2 | Maccabi Ein Mahil | 26 | 20 | 4 | 2 | 71 | 25 | +46 | 64 | |
| 3 | Beitar Umm al-Fahm | 26 | 18 | 2 | 6 | 57 | 28 | +29 | 56 | |
| 4 | Maccabi Nazareth Illit | 26 | 14 | 7 | 5 | 86 | 22 | +64 | 49 | |
| 5 | Hapoel Bnei Nazareth | 26 | 14 | 6 | 6 | 67 | 34 | +33 | 48 | |
| 6 | F.C. Daburiyya | 26 | 12 | 4 | 10 | 49 | 41 | +8 | 38 (Note: 2 points deducted.) | |
| 7 | Hapoel Ka'abiyye | 26 | 11 | 3 | 12 | 55 | 54 | +1 | 36 | |
| 8 | Beitar Afula | 26 | 9 | 8 | 9 | 50 | 44 | +6 | 35 | |
| 9 | Hapoel Bnei Nujeidat | 26 | 9 | 6 | 11 | 35 | 52 | −17 | 33 | |
| 10 | Hapoel al-Ittihad Nazareth | 26 | 8 | 1 | 17 | 46 | 68 | −22 | 25 | |
| 11 | Hapoel Bnei Hajajra | 26 | 6 | 4 | 16 | 37 | 73 | −36 | 22 | |
| 12 | Hapoel Muawiya | 26 | 5 | 4 | 17 | 36 | 76 | −40 | 19 | |
| 13 | Beitar el-Amal Nazareth | 26 | 5 | 2 | 19 | 44 | 77 | −33 | 17 | |
| 14 | Hapoel Manshiya Zabda | 26 | 2 | 0 | 24 | 22 | 118 | −96 | 6 | |

== Samaria Division ==
| Pos | Team | Pld | W | D | L | GF | GA | GD | Pts | Promotion |
|---|---|---|---|---|---|---|---|---|---|---|
| 1 | F.C. Givat Olga | 24 | 22 | 0 | 2 | 124 | 16 | +108 | 66 | Promoted to Liga Bet |
| 2 | Maccabi Daliyat al-Karmel | 24 | 20 | 2 | 2 | 108 | 19 | +89 | 62 | Promoted to Liga Bet |
| 3 | Ironi Nesher | 24 | 20 | 2 | 2 | 96 | 25 | +71 | 62 | Promoted to Liga Bet |
| 4 | F.C. Kiryat Yam | 24 | 14 | 3 | 7 | 57 | 42 | +15 | 45 | |
| 5 | Maccabi Barkai | 24 | 11 | 3 | 10 | 45 | 60 | −15 | 36 | |
| 6 | Hapoel Spartak Haifa | 24 | 11 | 0 | 13 | 56 | 61 | −5 | 33 | |
| 7 | Maccabi Fureidis | 24 | 10 | 2 | 12 | 41 | 46 | −5 | 32 | |
| 8 | Hapoel Yokneam | 24 | 7 | 5 | 12 | 41 | 61 | −20 | 26 | |
| 9 | Maccabi Neve Sha'anan | 24 | 7 | 3 | 14 | 43 | 57 | −14 | 24 | |
| 10 | Beitar Pardes Hanna | 24 | 7 | 2 | 15 | 42 | 82 | −40 | 23 | |
| 11 | Hapoel Bnei Zemer | 24 | 7 | 2 | 15 | 32 | 61 | −29 | 22 (Note: 1 point deducted.) | |
| 12 | Maccabi Jisr az-Zarqa | 24 | 3 | 4 | 17 | 31 | 98 | −67 | 13 | |
| 13 | Beitar Hadera | 24 | 3 | 0 | 21 | 23 | 111 | −88 | 9 | |

Notes:

Maccabi Daliyat al-Karmel competed with Bnei Kabul from the Upper Galilee division for a vacant spot in Liga Bet, and promoted after winning the match 3–1.

== Sharon Division ==
| Pos | Team | Pld | W | D | L | GF | GA | GD | Pts | Promotion |
|---|---|---|---|---|---|---|---|---|---|---|
| 1 | Maccabi Bnei Jaljulia | 22 | 19 | 1 | 2 | 84 | 16 | +68 | 58 | Promoted to Liga Bet |
| 2 | F.C. Tel Mond | 22 | 15 | 3 | 4 | 76 | 30 | +46 | 48 | |
| 3 | Ahva Tayibe | 22 | 15 | 3 | 4 | 65 | 26 | +39 | 48 | |
| 4 | F.C. Bnei Ra'anana | 22 | 15 | 2 | 5 | 76 | 20 | +56 | 47 | |
| 5 | F.C. Tzeirei Tayibe | 22 | 13 | 3 | 6 | 48 | 29 | +19 | 42 | |
| 6 | Hapoel Aliyah Kfar Saba | 22 | 10 | 4 | 8 | 63 | 46 | +17 | 34 | |
| 7 | Hapoel Hod HaSharon | 22 | 10 | 1 | 11 | 68 | 48 | +20 | 31 | |
| 8 | Beitar Ironi Ariel | 22 | 5 | 4 | 13 | 29 | 78 | −49 | 19 | |
| 9 | Hapoel Kafr Bara | 22 | 5 | 3 | 14 | 48 | 63 | −15 | 18 | |
| 10 | Beitar Nes Tubruk | 22 | 5 | 3 | 14 | 37 | 88 | −51 | 18 | |
| 11 | F.C. Kafr Qasim Nibrass | 22 | 3 | 1 | 18 | 23 | 109 | −86 | 10 | |
| 12 | F.C. Ariel | 22 | 3 | 0 | 19 | 13 | 77 | −64 | 9 | |

== Tel Aviv Division ==
| Pos | Team | Pld | W | D | L | GF | GA | GD | Pts | Promotion |
|---|---|---|---|---|---|---|---|---|---|---|
| 1 | Hapoel Oranit | 24 | 17 | 6 | 1 | 70 | 19 | +51 | 57 | Promoted to Liga Bet |
| 2 | Gadna Tel Aviv | 24 | 17 | 3 | 4 | 67 | 23 | +44 | 54 | |
| 3 | Hapoel Jaljulia | 24 | 16 | 3 | 5 | 70 | 30 | +40 | 51 | |
| 4 | F.C. Roei Heshbon Tel Aviv | 24 | 14 | 4 | 6 | 63 | 36 | +27 | 46 | |
| 5 | Beitar Oranit | 24 | 11 | 3 | 10 | 49 | 35 | +14 | 36 | |
| 6 | Hapoel Neve Golan | 24 | 11 | 3 | 10 | 47 | 48 | −1 | 36 | |
| 7 | Hapoel Kafr Qasim Shouaa | 24 | 10 | 4 | 10 | 41 | 41 | 0 | 34 | |
| 8 | Beitar Ezra | 24 | 8 | 8 | 8 | 46 | 32 | +14 | 32 | |
| 9 | F.C. Mahanaim Ramat Gan | 24 | 8 | 7 | 9 | 36 | 42 | −6 | 31 | |
| 10 | Elitzur Jaffa Tel Aviv | 24 | 6 | 5 | 13 | 40 | 60 | −20 | 23 | |
| 11 | Hapoel Kiryat Shalom | 24 | 6 | 2 | 16 | 40 | 72 | −32 | 20 | |
| 12 | Brit Sport Ma'of | 24 | 3 | 4 | 17 | 35 | 89 | −54 | 13 | |
| 13 | International Tel Aviv | 24 | 2 | 2 | 20 | 34 | 111 | −77 | 8 | |

== Central Division ==
| Pos | Team | Pld | W | D | L | GF | GA | GD | Pts | Promotion |
|---|---|---|---|---|---|---|---|---|---|---|
| 1 | Bnei Yichalel Rehovot | 22 | 20 | 1 | 1 | 82 | 14 | +68 | 61 | Promoted to Liga Bet |
| 2 | Bnei Yehud | 22 | 18 | 3 | 1 | 85 | 30 | +55 | 57 | |
| 3 | Ironi Beit Dagan | 22 | 13 | 4 | 5 | 78 | 32 | +46 | 43 | |
| 4 | Maccabi Rehovot | 22 | 13 | 3 | 6 | 56 | 34 | +22 | 41 (Note: 1 point deducted.) | |
| 5 | A.S. Holon | 22 | 8 | 5 | 9 | 50 | 48 | +2 | 29 | |
| 6 | Elitzur Yehud | 22 | 7 | 5 | 10 | 45 | 47 | −2 | 26 | |
| 7 | Hapoel Matzliah | 22 | 7 | 5 | 10 | 38 | 43 | −5 | 26 | |
| 8 | F.C. Rishon LeZion | 22 | 6 | 7 | 9 | 49 | 54 | −5 | 25 | |
| 9 | Beitar Jaffa | 22 | 6 | 4 | 12 | 43 | 49 | −6 | 22 | |
| 10 | Maccabi Ironi Or Yehuda | 22 | 6 | 4 | 12 | 35 | 55 | −20 | 22 | |
| 11 | Maccabi Dynamo Holon | 22 | 5 | 3 | 14 | 25 | 57 | −32 | 18 | |
| 12 | Hapoel Ramla | 22 | 1 | 0 | 21 | 28 | 151 | −123 | 3 | |

== South Division ==
| Pos | Team | Pld | W | D | L | GF | GA | GD | Pts | Promotion |
|---|---|---|---|---|---|---|---|---|---|---|
| 1 | Hapoel Katamon Jerusalem | 16 | 12 | 2 | 2 | 59 | 17 | +42 | 38 | Promoted to Liga Bet |
| 2 | Maccabi Segev Shalom | 16 | 11 | 2 | 3 | 41 | 20 | +21 | 35 | |
| 3 | Ironi Beit Shemesh | 16 | 9 | 4 | 3 | 37 | 22 | +15 | 31 | |
| 4 | Beitar Ashkelon | 16 | 8 | 3 | 5 | 39 | 27 | +12 | 25 (Note: 2 points deducted.) | |
| 5 | Hapoel F.C. Hevel Modi'in | 16 | 7 | 4 | 5 | 37 | 31 | +6 | 25 | |
| 6 | Ironi Modi'in | 16 | 7 | 2 | 7 | 44 | 32 | +12 | 23 | |
| 7 | Tzeirei Al-Huzeil | 16 | 5 | 3 | 8 | 24 | 38 | −14 | 18 | |
| 8 | Hapoel Tel Sheva | 16 | 1 | 2 | 13 | 24 | 57 | −33 | 5 | |
| 9 | F.C. Tzeirei al-Hoshla | 16 | 1 | 0 | 15 | 13 | 74 | −61 | 3 | |

Notes:

During the season, Hapoel Bnei Beit Safafa and Hapoel Hura (both after 2 matches) folded and their results were annulled.
