= 2008–09 Liga Gimel =

Israeli football season

The 2008–09 Liga Gimel season saw 83 clubs competing in 6 regional divisions for promotion to Liga Bet. This was the last season that Liga Gimel was the sixth tier in the Israeli football league system, a position it held since 1998–99.

At the end of the season, due to the league system restructuring, two clubs from each division were promoted to Liga Bet.

== Upper Galilee Division ==
Pos	Team	Pld	W	D	L	GF	GA	GD	Pts	Promotion
1	Ihud Bnei Majd al-Krum	20	13	4	3	57	22	+35	43	Promoted to Liga Bet
2	Maccabi Acre	20	12	5	3	45	22	+23	41	Promoted to Liga Bet
3	Bnei Maghar	20	11	4	5	29	22	+7	37	
4	Maccabi Bnei Nahf	20	11	4	5	31	17	+14	36 (Note: 1 point deducted.)	
5	F.C. Bnei Arraba	20	9	1	10	46	37	+9	28	
6	Maccabi Ein Mahil	20	8	4	8	39	31	+8	28	
7	Hapoel Bnei Bi'ina	20	6	4	10	24	41	−17	22	
8	Ironi Bnei Kabul	20	5	7	8	34	33	+1	19 (Note: 3 points deducted.)	
9	Hapoel Shefa-'Amr	20	5	4	11	24	38	−14	19	
10	Beitar F.C. Tabash	20	4	6	10	17	35	−18	17	
11	F.C. Otzma Bnei Yarka	20	4	1	15	25	73	−48	11 (Note: 2 points deducted.)	

Notes:

Hapoel Jatt Yanuh HaGlilit, Hapoel Hatzor and Maccabi Kafr Yasif all registered to play in the division, but withdrew before playing a single match.

== Jezreel Division ==
Pos	Team	Pld	W	D	L	GF	GA	GD	Pts	Promotion
1	Maccabi Ahi Iksal	24	21	2	1	93	16	+77	65	Promoted to Liga Bet
2	Hapoel Bnei Musmus	24	18	5	1	82	23	+59	59	Promoted to Liga Bet
3	Maccabi Nazareth Illit	24	17	5	2	56	22	+34	56	
4	F.C. Kfar Kama	24	16	2	6	55	28	+27	50	
5	F.C. Daburiyya	24	12	3	9	48	45	+3	39	
6	Hapoel al-Ittihad Nazareth	24	10	4	10	54	41	+13	34	
7	Hapoel Bnei Nazareth	24	9	5	10	44	39	+5	32	
8	Beitar Afula	24	5	10	9	44	35	+9	25	
9	Beitar Umm al-Fahm	24	7	6	11	36	42	−6	24 (Note: 3 points deducted.)	
10	Maccabi Bnei Ilut	24	7	4	13	47	54	−7	18 (Note: 7 points deducted.)	
11	Hapoel Ka'abiyye	24	4	2	18	33	91	−58	14	
12	Hapoel Manshiya Zabda	24	2	3	19	19	99	−80	9	
13	Beitar el-Amal Nazareth	24	2	1	21	37	113	−76	6 (Note: 1 point deducted.)	

Notes:

Hapoel Muawiya registered to play in the division, but withdrew before playing a single match.

== Samaria Division ==
Pos	Team	Pld	W	D	L	GF	GA	GD	Pts	Promotion
1	Maccabi Or Akiva	24	21	2	1	101	9	+92	65	Promoted to Liga Bet
2	Hapoel Bnei Jisr az-Zarqa	24	21	0	3	88	21	+67	63	Promoted to Liga Bet
3	Maccabi Daliyat al-Karmel	24	17	2	5	64	28	+36	53	
4	Hapoel Spartak Haifa	24	14	1	9	61	44	+17	43	
5	Maccabi Neve Sha'anan	24	12	1	11	41	35	+6	37	
6	Hapoel Bnei Zemer	24	9	6	9	41	57	−16	33	
7	Hapoel Yokneam	24	9	4	11	45	48	−3	31	
8	Hapoel Tel Hanan	24	9	5	10	41	46	−5	31 (Note: 1 point deducted.)	
9	Beitar Pardes Hanna	24	10	2	12	47	63	−16	30 (Note: 2 points deducted.)	
10	F.C. Kiryat Yam	24	7	6	11	38	56	−18	27	
11	Maccabi Jisr az-Zarqa	24	7	4	13	34	40	−6	25	
12	Maccabi Fureidis	24	2	3	19	22	79	−57	9	
13	Beitar Hadera	24	0	0	24	31	128	−97	0	

== Sharon Division ==
Pos	Team	Pld	W	D	L	GF	GA	GD	Pts	Promotion
1	Beitar Petah Tikva	30	25	0	5	115	26	+89	75	Promoted to Liga Bet
2	Hapoel Bik'at HaYarden	30	24	2	4	105	20	+85	73 (Note: 1 point deducted.)	Promoted to Liga Bet
3	Ironi Ariel	30	23	3	4	86	25	+61	72	
4	F.C. Bnei Ra'anana	30	18	5	7	105	61	+44	59	
5	F.C. Tzeirei Tayibe	30	17	5	8	65	31	+34	56	
6	Ahva Tayibe	30	16	7	7	67	46	+21	55	
7	F.C. Tel Mond	30	16	4	10	92	64	+28	52	
8	Maccabi Bnei Jaljulia	30	14	7	9	56	34	+22	47 (Note: 2 points deducted.)	
9	Hapoel Aliyah Kfar Saba	30	14	5	11	85	62	+23	45	
10	F.C. Bnei Qalansawe	30	11	1	18	60	89	−29	34	
11	F.C. Tira	30	8	4	18	69	79	−10	28	
12	Beitar Nes Tubruk	30	7	3	20	50	135	−85	24	
13	Beitar Ironi Ariel	30	5	6	19	45	86	−41	21	
14	Hapoel Kafr Qasim Shouaa	30	7	1	22	41	89	−48	20	
15	Hapoel Kafr Bara	30	4	4	22	28	94	−66	16	
16	Beitar Oranit	30	1	3	26	13	151	−138	5	

== Tel Aviv Division ==
Pos	Team	Pld	W	D	L	GF	GA	GD	Pts	Promotion
1	Maccabi Kabilio Jaffa	30	27	2	1	152	9	+143	83	Promoted to Liga Bet
2	Hapoel Kiryat Ono	30	25	1	4	108	25	+83	76	Promoted to Liga Bet
3	Bnei Yehud	30	22	4	4	91	28	+63	70	
4	Ironi Beit Dagan	30	19	6	5	84	38	+46	63	
5	Gadna Tel Aviv	30	16	6	8	82	41	+41	54	
6	Hapoel Neve Golan	30	15	7	8	76	61	+15	52	
7	Elitzur Jaffa Tel Aviv	30	15	3	12	79	48	+31	48	
8	Hapoel Oranit	30	15	2	13	68	59	+9	47	
9	Hapoel Kiryat Shalom	30	12	3	15	72	74	−2	39	
10	A.S. Holon	30	12	0	18	55	95	−40	36	
11	Brit Sport Ma'of	30	10	4	16	58	88	−30	34	
12	Maccabi Dynamo Holon	30	10	1	19	53	83	−30	27 (Note: 4 points deducted.)	
13	Hapoel Ironi Yehud	30	7	4	19	74	106	−32	22 (Note: 3 points deducted.)	
14	Elitzur Yehud	30	6	4	20	50	97	−47	22	
15	Beitar Ezra	30	3	3	24	43	126	−83	12	
16	Hapoel Ramla	30	1	0	29	30	197	−167	−4 (Note: 7 points deducted.)	

== Central Division ==
Pos	Team	Pld	W	D	L	GF	GA	GD	Pts	Qualification
1	F.C. Kiryat Gat	26	18	5	3	87	26	+61	59	Promotion play-offs
2	Hapoel Rahat	26	18	5	3	73	35	+38	59	Promotion play-offs
3	Bnei Yichalel Rehovot	26	18	5	3	56	21	+35	59	Promotion play-offs
4	Tzeirei Al-Huzeil	26	12	8	6	63	35	+28	42 (Note: 2 points deducted.)	
5	Beitar Ashkelon	26	11	6	9	69	45	+24	39	
6	Beitar Jaffa	26	11	5	10	47	59	−12	38	
7	Hapoel Matzliah	26	10	6	10	41	49	−8	36	
8	Ironi Beit Shemesh	26	10	4	12	45	49	−4	34	
9	Hapoel Hura	26	9	5	12	46	61	−15	32	
10	Maccabi Rehovot	26	7	7	12	23	35	−12	28	
11	Maccabi Segev Shalom	26	7	4	15	37	59	−22	25	
12	Hapoel Tel Sheva	26	6	6	14	40	55	−15	24	
13	Hapoel Bnei Beit Safafa	26	4	7	15	33	67	−34	19	
14	F.C. Rishon LeZion	26	3	3	20	32	96	−64	12	

=== Promotion play-offs ===
As F.C. Kiryat Gat, Hapoel Rahat and Bnei Yichalel Rehovot finished level on points, the three clubs played a promotion play-offs to determine the league winner and the promoting clubs to Liga Bet.

Pos	Team	Pld	W	D	L	GF	GA	GD	Pts	Promotion
1	F.C. Kiryat Gat	2	2	0	0	6	2	+4	6	Promoted to Liga Bet.
2	Hapoel Rahat	2	1	0	1	4	4	0	3	Promoted to Liga Bet.
3	Bnei Yichalel Rehovot	2	0	0	2	3	6	−3	0	
