= 2014–15 Liga Bet =

Israeli football season

The 2014–15 Liga Bet season saw Hapoel Kafr Kanna (champions of the North A division), Hapoel Baqa al-Gharbiyye (champions of the North B division), Hapoel Bik'at HaYarden (champions of the South A division) and Bnei Eilat (champions of the South B division) win the title and promotion to Liga Alef.

The clubs ranked 2nd to 5th in each division entered a promotion play-off, at the end of which, Hapoel Iksal (from the North section) and Hapoel Kiryat Ono (from the South section) met the teams ranked 14th in Liga Alef. Hapoel Iksal won their tie and was promoted to Liga Alef as well, while Hapoel Kiryat Ono lost and remained in Liga Bet.

At the bottom, Hapoel Ironi Bnei I'billin (from North A division) and Otzma F.C. Holon (from South A division) were automatically relegated to Liga Gimel. Hapoel Umm al-Ghanem Nein (from North B division) and Hapoel Arad (form South B division) folded during the season, leaving their respective divisions with 15 teams.

The clubs ranked 12th to 15th in each division entered a relegation play-off, at the end of which Ahva Arraba (from North A division), Bnei Nujeidat (from North B division), Maccabi Bnei Jaljulia (from South A division) and F.C. Bnei Ra'anana (from South B division) dropped to Liga Gimel as well.

== North A Division ==
Pos	Team	Pld	W	D	L	GF	GA	GD	Pts	Promotion or relegation
1	Hapoel Kafr Kanna	30	25	2	3	89	16	+73	77	Promotion to Liga Alef
2	Bnei Kabul	30	20	4	6	56	22	+34	64	Promotion play-offs
3	Maccabi Acre	30	19	6	5	62	28	+34	63	Promotion play-offs
4	Ahi Acre	30	17	3	10	54	23	+31	54	Promotion play-offs
5	Beitar Haifa	30	15	6	9	60	32	+28	51	Promotion play-offs
6	Hapoel Bu'eine	30	12	7	11	34	39	−5	43	
7	Ihud Bnei Sumei	30	12	6	12	37	48	−11	42	
8	Ahva Kafr Manda	30	11	7	12	47	47	0	40	
9	Hapoel Shefa-'Amr	30	12	5	13	34	43	−9	39 (Note: Hapoel Shefa-'Amr had two points deducted)	
10	Al-Nahda Nazareth	30	11	5	14	37	44	−7	38	
11	Hapoel Ironi Safed	30	9	10	11	40	58	−18	37	
12	Hapoel Sakhnin	30	10	4	16	36	51	−15	34	Relegation play-offs
13	Hapoel Kaukab	30	8	5	17	26	41	−15	29	Relegation play-offs
14	Ahva Arraba	30	7	8	15	29	42	−13	29	Relegation play-offs
15	Bnei Maghar	30	8	1	21	28	68	−40	25	Relegation play-offs
16	Hapoel Ironi Bnei I'billin	30	2	5	23	22	89	−67	11	Relegation to Liga Gimel

Source: IFA (in Hebrew)
Rules for classification: 1st points; 2nd matches won; 3rd head-to-head; 4th decision match

== North B Division ==
Pos	Team	Pld	W	D	L	GF	GA	GD	Pts	Promotion or qualification
1	Hapoel Baqa al-Gharbiyye	28	20	5	3	64	19	+45	65	Promotion to Liga Alef
2	Hapoel Daliyat al-Karmel	28	19	5	4	56	26	+30	62	Promotion play-offs
3	Hapoel Iksal	28	17	6	5	58	24	+34	57	Promotion play-offs
4	Maccabi Ein Mahil	28	16	4	8	54	28	+26	52	Promotion play-offs
5	Maccabi Ahi Iksal	28	15	4	9	49	40	+9	49	Promotion play-offs
6	F.C. Tzeirei Tur'an	28	13	8	7	49	37	+12	47	
7	Ihud Bnei Kafr Qara	28	11	7	10	42	42	0	40	
8	Maccabi Sulam	28	11	6	11	48	55	−7	39	
9	Hapoel Sandala Gilboa	28	10	3	15	45	53	−8	33	
10	Hapoel Ramot Menashe Megiddo	28	9	5	14	39	51	−12	32	
11	Hapoel Umm al-Fahm	28	7	11	10	33	34	−1	32	
12	Maccabi Ironi Yafa	28	7	4	17	36	65	−29	25	Relegation play-offs
13	Hapoel Bnei Nujeidat	28	5	7	16	25	59	−34	22	Relegation play-offs
14	F.C. Pardes Hanna-Karkur	28	4	7	17	23	58	−35	19	Relegation play-offs
15	F.C. Daburiyya	28	3	4	21	32	62	−30	13	Relegation play-offs
–	Hapoel Umm al-Ghanem Nein	0	0	0	0	0	0	0	0	Dismissed (Note: After failing to appear to three matches, Hapoel Umm al-Ghanem Nein was dismissed from the league and its results were nullified.)

Source: IFA (in Hebrew)
Rules for classification: 1st points; 2nd matches won; 3rd head-to-head; 4th decision match

== South A Division ==
Pos	Team	Pld	W	D	L	GF	GA	GD	Pts	Promotion or relegation
1	Hapoel Bik'at HaYarden	30	21	3	6	73	29	+44	66	Promotion to Liga Alef
2	Hapoel Tzafririm Holon	30	18	3	9	52	41	+11	57	Promotion play-offs
3	Hapoel Kafr Qasim Shouaa	30	17	6	7	52	30	+22	57	Promotion play-offs
4	Hapoel Kiryat Ono	30	17	5	8	54	31	+23	56	Promotion play-offs
5	Beitar Ramat Gan	30	15	7	8	46	39	+7	52	Promotion play-offs
6	Maccabi Ironi Kfar Yona	30	14	6	10	44	34	+10	48	
7	Hapoel Nahlat Yehuda	30	13	8	9	55	41	+14	47	
8	F.C. Bnei Jaffa Ortodoxim	30	13	8	9	52	32	+20	46 (Note: F.C. Bnei Jaffa Ortodoxim had one point deducted.)	
9	F.C. Roei Heshbon Tel Aviv	30	11	11	8	59	45	+14	44	
10	Hapoel Ramat Israel	30	13	4	13	57	47	+10	43	
11	F.C. Tira	30	11	6	13	54	56	−2	39	
12	F.C. Tzeirei Tayibe	30	9	8	13	44	40	+4	35	Relegation play-offs
13	Beitar Petah Tikva	30	8	9	13	37	47	−10	33	Relegation play-offs
14	F.C. Ironi Or Yehuda	30	10	1	19	42	63	−21	31	Relegation play-offs
15	Maccabi Bnei Jaljulia	30	4	2	24	31	91	−60	14	Relegation play-offs
16	Otzma F.C. Holon	30	1	3	26	21	107	−86	6	Relegation to Liga Gimel

Source: IFA (in Hebrew)
Rules for classification: 1st points; 2nd matches won; 3rd head-to-head; 4th decision match

== South B Division ==
Pos	Team	Pld	W	D	L	GF	GA	GD	Pts	Promotion or qualification
1	Bnei Eilat	28	20	5	3	67	23	+44	65	Promotion to Liga Alef
2	Ironi Modi'in	28	19	7	2	61	22	+39	64	Promotion play-offs
3	Maccabi Ironi Netivot	28	17	3	8	68	23	+45	54	Promotion play-offs
4	Beitar Ma'ale Adumim	28	17	3	8	61	48	+13	54	Promotion play-offs
5	Hapoel Merhavim	28	15	5	8	61	37	+24	50 (Note: BYR–HMR 1–4; HMR–BYR 0–3)	Promotion play-offs
6	Bnei Yeechalal Rehovot	28	15	5	8	45	27	+18	50	
7	F.C. Dimona	28	14	3	11	65	52	+13	45	
8	F.C. Be'er Sheva	28	12	6	10	57	49	+8	42	
9	Beitar Giv'at Ze'ev	28	10	7	11	55	39	+16	37	
10	A.S. Holon	28	11	1	16	54	65	−11	34	
11	Tzeirei Rahat	28	9	6	13	45	53	−8	33	
12	Hapoel Rahat	28	7	5	16	38	62	−24	25 (Note: Hapoel Rahat had one point deducted.)	Relegation play-offs
13	Beitar Yavne	28	6	2	20	21	60	−39	20	Relegation play-offs
14	Ironi Beit Shemesh	28	4	4	20	42	78	−36	16	Relegation play-offs
15	F.C. Bnei Ra'anana	28	0	0	28	22	124	−102	0	Relegation play-offs
–	Hapoel Arad	0	0	0	0	0	0	0	0	Folded (Note: Hapoel Arad folded after 15 matches and its results were nullified.)

Source: IFA (in Hebrew)
Rules for classification: 1st points; 2nd matches won; 3rd head-to-head; 4th decision match

== Promotion play-offs ==
=== Northern Divisions ===
Division semi-finals
2	Ironi Bnei Kabul	1
5	Beitar Haifa	0
North A division
3	Maccabi Ironi Acre	2
4	Ahi Acre	1
2	Hapoel Daliyat al-Karmel	2
5	Maccabi Ahi Iksal	1
North B division
3	Hapoel Iksal	2
4	Maccabi Ein Mahil	1

Division final
2	Ironi Bnei Kabul	0
3	Maccabi Ironi Acre	2
2	Hapoel Daliyat al-Karmel	1
3	Hapoel Iksal	3

Regional final
3NA	Maccabi Ironi Acre	2
3NB	Hapoel Iksal	4

Hapoel Iksal qualified to the promotion play-off match against 14th ranked club in Liga Alef North division, Hapoel Asi Gilboa.

=== Southern Divisions ===
Division semi-finals
2	Hapoel Tzafririm Holon	1
5	Beitar Ramat Gan	2
South A division
3	Hap. K. Qasim Shouaa	2 (1)
4	Hapoel Kiryat Ono	2 (3)
2	Ironi Modi'in	1
5	Hapoel Merhavim	0
South B division
3	Maccabi Ironi Netivot	1 (3)
4	Beitar Ma'ale Adumim	1 (4)

Division final
5	Beitar Ramat Gan	0
4	Hapoel Kiryat Ono	1
2	Ironi Modi'in	2
4	Beitar Ma'ale Adumim	1

Regional final
4SA	Hapoel Kiryat Ono	0 (5)
2SB	Ironi Modi'in	0 (3)

Hapoel Kiryat Ono qualified to the promotion play-off match against 14th ranked club in Liga Alef South division, Maccabi Kabilio Jaffa.

=== Promotion play-off Matches ===
==== North section ====
12 May 2015	Hapoel Asi Gilboa	0–1	Hapoel Iksal	Ilut Stadium
18:00 UTC+3			Abu Leil 60'

Hapoel Iksal Promoted to Liga Alef; Hapoel Asi Gilboa relegated to Liga Bet; However, they were eventually reprieved from relegation, following the merger between Hapoel Hadera and F.C. Givat Olga.

==== South Section ====
12 May 2015	Maccabi Kabilio Jaffa	2–0	Hapoel Kiryat Ono	Lod Municipal Stadium
18:00 UTC+3	Maman 67'; Levi 90'

Maccabi Kabilio Jaffa remained in Liga Alef; Hapoel Kiryat Ono remained in Liga Bet.

== Relegation play-offs ==
=== Northern divisions ===
North A division

Semi-finals
12	Hapoel Sakhnin	5
15	Bnei Maghar	2
13	Hapoel Kaukab	1
14	Ahva Arraba	0

Final
15	Bnei Maghar	2
14	Ahva Arraba	1

Ahva Arraba relegated to Liga Gimel

North B division

Semi-finals
12	Ironi Yafa	5
15	F.C. Daburiyya	2
13	Bnei Nujeidat	1
14	Pardes Hanna-Karkur	3

Final
15	F.C. Daburiyya	6
13	Bnei Nujeidat	0

Hapoel Bnei Nujeidat relegated to Liga Gimel

=== Southern divisions ===
South A division

Semi-finals
12	Tzeirei Tayibe	2
15	Bnei Jaljulia	1
13	Beitar Petah Tikva	1
14	Ironi Or Yehuda	0

Final
15	Bnei Jaljulia	0
14	Ironi Or Yehuda	1

Maccabi Bnei Jaljulia relegated to Liga Gimel

South B division

Semi-finals
12	Hapoel Rahat	5
15	Bnei Ra'anana	1
13	Beitar Yavne	2
14	Ironi Beit Shemesh	3

Final
15	Bnei Ra'anana	1 (2)
13	Beitar Yavne	1 (4)

F.C. Bnei Ra'anana relegated to Liga Gimel
