= Nir Lax =

Israeli footballer

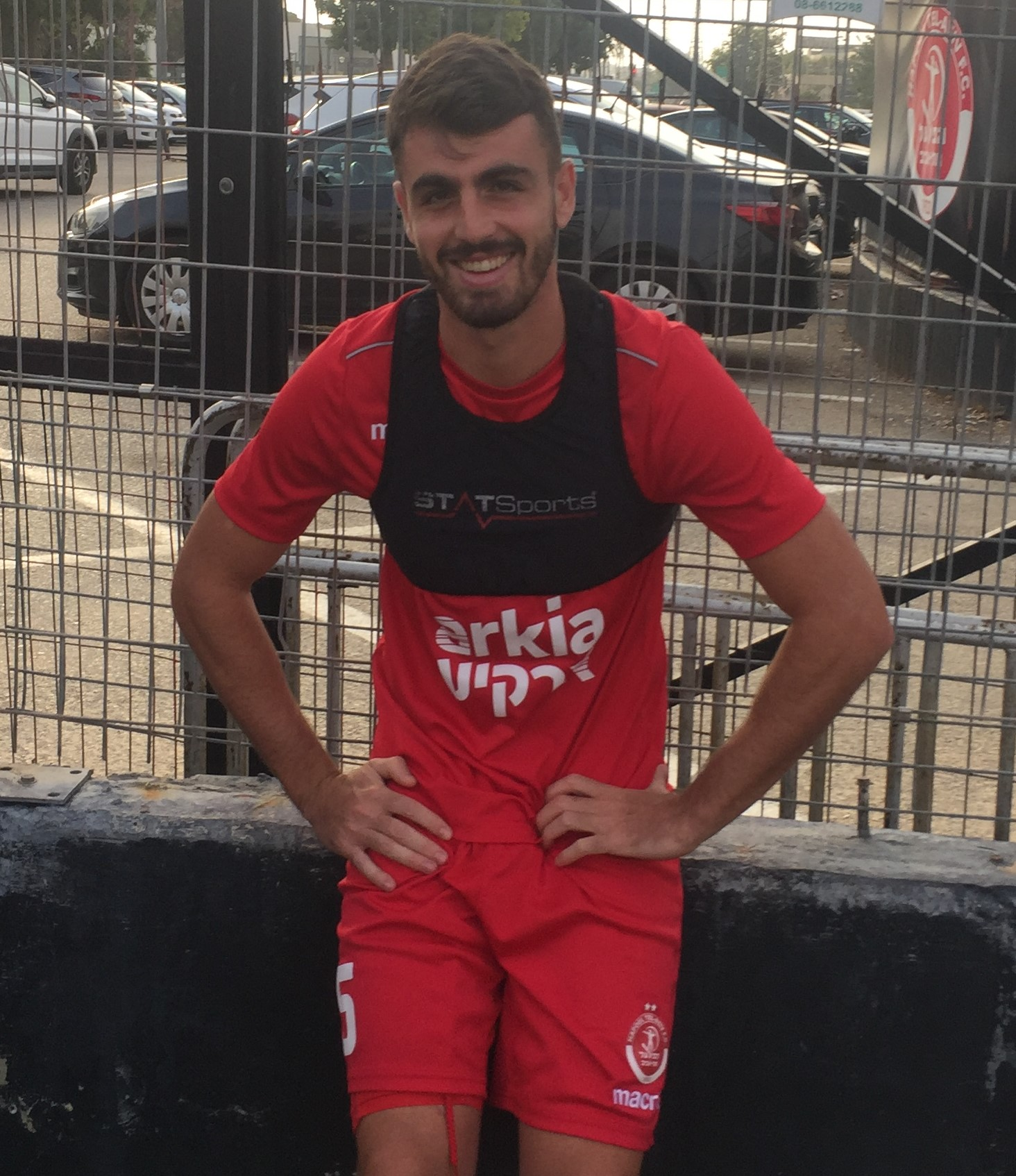

Personal information
- Date of birth: August 10, 1994 (age 32)
- Place of birth: Rishon LeZion, Israel
- Height: 1.78 m (5 ft 10 in)
- Position: Defensive midfielder

Team information
- Current team: Ironi Modi'in
- Number: 15

Youth career
- –2012: Hapoel Tel Aviv

Senior career*
Years	Team	Apps	(Gls)
2012–2020	Hapoel Tel Aviv	77	(2)
2014–2015	→ Beitar Tel Aviv Ramla	30	(0)
2016–2017	→ Bnei Sakhnin	25	(1)
2020–2021	Petrolul Ploiești	17	(0)
2021–2022	Bnei Sakhnin	18	(1)
2022–2025	Hapoel Nof HaGalil	65	(1)
2025–	Ironi Modi'in	31	(0)

International career
2011–2012	Israel U-18	2	(0)
2012	Israel U-19	13	(0)
- * Club domestic league appearances and goals as of 24 June 2026

Nir Lax (Hebrew: ניר לקס; born August 10, 1994) is an Israeli footballer who plays for Ironi Modi'in in the Liga Leumit.

== Honours ==
Hapoel Tel Aviv

- Israel State Cup: 2011–12
- Liga Leumit: 2017–18
