= Tomer Shem-Tov =

Israeli footballer

Tomer Shem-Tov תומר שם-טוב
Personal information
- Date of birth: 17 April 1978 (age 48)
- Place of birth: Ra'anana, Israel
- Position: Midfielder

Youth career
- Hapoel Kfar Saba

Senior career*
Years	Team	Apps	(Gls)
1994–2000	Hapoel Kfar Saba		
2000–2001	Maccabi Netanya	27	(0)
2001–2005	Hapoel Kfar Saba		
2005–2007	Hapoel Ashkelon		
2010–2011	Bnei Ra'anana	22	(0)
2011	Hapoel Morasha Ramat HaSharon	6	(0)
- * Club domestic league appearances and goals

Tomer Shem-Tov (Hebrew: תומר שם-טוב; born 17 April 1978) is an Israeli former professional footballer who played as a midfielder.
