= Eran Kulik =

Israeli footballer and manager

Eran Kulik ערן קוליק
Personal information
- Full name: Eran Kulik
- Date of birth: 1946 (age 79–80)
- Place of birth: Herzliya, Israel

Youth career
- Maccabi Herzliya

Senior career*
Years	Team	Apps	(Gls)
	Maccabi Herzliya		(95)

Managerial career
- 1978–1979: Maccabi Haifa
- Maccabi Herzliya
- Maccabi Kiryat Gat
- Hapoel Kiryat Ono
- Beitar Kfar Saba
- 1988–1989: Maccabi Ironi Ashdod
- 2001–2003: Hapoel Ra'anana
- 2006–2009: Hapoel Bnei Lod
- 2009: Bnei Sakhnin
- 2010: Ironi Ramat HaSharon
- 2019: Hapoel Bnei Lod
- 2019–2020: Maccabi Herzliya
- * Club domestic league appearances and goals

Eran Kulik (Hebrew: ערן קוליק; born 1946) is an Israeli former footballer and currently works as a manager.
