= Tomer Elbaz =

Israeli footballer

Tomer Elbaz תומר אלבז
Personal information
- Full name: Tomer Elbaz
- Date of birth: July 3, 1989 (age 37)
- Place of birth: Petah Tikva, Israel
- Position: Center back

Team information
- Current team: Maccabi Yavne
- Number: 25

Youth career
- Maccabi Petah Tikva

Senior career*
Years	Team	Apps	(Gls)
2008–2017	Maccabi Petah Tikva	68	(6)
2015–2016	→ Hapoel Bnei Lod	25	(1)
2016–2017	→ Hapoel Katamon	15	(0)
2017	→ Hapoel Petah Tikva	0	(0)
2017–2018	F.C. Kafr Qasim	23	(0)
2018	Hapoel Baqa al-Gharbiyye	4	(0)
2018–2019	Hapoel Asi Gilboa	21	(0)
2019–2020	F.C. Haifa Robi Shapira	14	(0)
2020	Maccabi Yavne	5	(0)
2020	Hapoel Kafr Kanna	3	(0)
- * Club domestic league appearances and goals as of 30 January 2020

Tomer Elbaz (Hebrew: תומר אלבז; born 3 July 1989) is an Israeli footballer who currently plays at Maccabi Yavne.
