= Arian Mršulja =

Croatian footballer

Personal information
- Date of birth: 11 February 1998 (age 28)
- Place of birth: Rijeka, Croatia
- Height: 1.90 m (6 ft 3 in)
- Position: Defender

Team information
- Current team: Ironi Modi'in

Youth career
- 2010–2012: Rijeka
- 2012–2014: NK Mune
- 2014–2016: Istra 1961

Senior career*
Years	Team	Apps	(Gls)
2016–2018	Mezzolara	21	(0)
2018–2019	Birkirkara	1	(0)
2019	→ Senglea Athletic (loan)	7	(1)
2019–2020	Smederevo	15	(0)
2020	Šibenik	2	(0)
2021	Noah Jūrmala		
2021–2022	Neftekhimik Nizhnekamsk	6	(0)
2022–2023	Vršac	26	(3)
2023–2024	Viitorul Târgu Jiu	18	(1)
2024–2025	Maccabi Jaffa	24	(1)
2025–2026	Montana	6	(0)
2026–	Ironi Modi'in	0	(0)
- * Club domestic league appearances and goals as of 11 June 2026

Arian Mršulja (born 11 February 1998) is a Croatian professional footballer who plays as a defender for Bulgarian First League club Montana.

== Club career ==
He made his debut in the Russian Football National League for FC Neftekhimik Nizhnekamsk on 19 September 2021 in a game against FC KAMAZ Naberezhnye Chelny.
