= Arik Gilrovich =

Israeli footballer and manager

Arik Gilrovich אריק גילרוביץ
Personal information
- Date of birth: 12 February 1960 (age 66)
- Place of birth: Yad Mordechai, Israel
- Height: 5 ft 11 in (1.80 m)
- Positions: Defender; striker

Senior career*
Years	Team	Apps	(Gls)
1980–1991	Hapoel Ramat Gan	?	(28)
1991–1992	Maccabi Sha'arayim		
1992–1993	Beitar Petah Tikva		
1993–1994	Hapoel Yehud		
1994–1995	Hapoel Mahane Yehuda		
1995–1996	M.M Givat Shmuel		
1997	Beitar Ariel		
1997–2000	Maccabi HaShikma Ramat Hen		

Managerial career
- 2001–2002: Hapoel Kiryat Ono
- 2002–2003: Maccabi HaShikma Ramat Hen
- 2003–2004: Ironi Ramla
- 2005–2006: Maccabi Amishav Petah Tikva
- 2006–2008: Maccabi Bat Yam
- 2008–2009: Hapoel Ironi Rishon LeZion
- 2010–2011: Beitar Shimshon Tel Aviv
- 2013: Hapoel Ramat Gan
- 2014–2015: Kafr Qasim
- * Club domestic league appearances and goals

Arik Gilrovich (Hebrew: אריק גילרוביץ) is a former Israeli footballer and manager.

== Managerial statistics ==
Team	Nat	From	To	Record				
Team	Nat	From	To	P	W	D	L	Win %
Hapoel Ramat Gan	(Israel)	4 June 2013	12 October 2013	8	2	1	5	25.00
