= Obieda Abu Rabiya =

Israeli footballer

Obeida Abu Rabiya عبيدة أبو ربيعة
Personal information
- Full name: Obeida Abu Rabiya
- Date of birth: February 10, 1990 (age 36)
- Place of birth: Nazareth, Israel
- Position: Winger

Youth career
- 1999–2007: Maccabi Akhi Nazareth

Senior career*
Years	Team	Apps	(Gls)
2007–2018	Maccabi Akhi Nazareth	288	(23)
2018–2019	Hapoel Baqa al-Gharbiyye	30	(3)
2019	Maccabi Tamra	1	(0)
- * Club domestic league appearances and goals

Obeida Abu Rabiya (Arabic: عبيدة أبو ربيعة, Hebrew: עוביידה אבו רביע; born 10 February 1990) is an Israeli footballer who plays for Maccabi Akhi Nazareth.
