= Bnei al-Salam Rahat F.C. =

Israeli football club

Bnei al-Salam Rahat
- Full name: Bnei al-Salam Rahat Football Club בני אלסלאם רהט ابناء السلام رهط
- Founded: 2011
- Ground: Rahat
- Manager: Najeeb alkrenawi
- League: Liga Gimel South
- 2014–15: 2nd

Bnei al-Salam Rahat (Hebrew: בני אלסלאם רהט) (Arabic: ابناء السلام رهط), is an Israeli football club based in Rahat. The club currently plays in Liga Gimel South division.

== History ==
The club was founded in 2011 by members of the Al-Krenawi family and played in Liga Gimel since, usually finishing in mid-table. In 2015–16, the club finished as runners-up of its division, just two points behind division champions Maccabi Segev Shalom.

In the cup, the club's best achievement is reaching the fourth round in 2012–13, eventually losing to Maccabi Ironi Sderot.
