= Yarin Hassan =

Israeli footballer

Personal information
- Full name: Yarin Hassan
- Date of birth: March 22, 1994 (age 32)
- Place of birth: Netanya, Israel
- Position: Center-back

Youth career
- 2000–2014: Maccabi Netanya

Senior career*
Years	Team	Apps	(Gls)
2012–2016	Maccabi Netanya	68	(2)
2016–2019	Hapoel Petah Tikva	74	(8)
2019–2020	Hapoel Hadera	25	(0)
2021	Bisceglie	1	(0)
2021	Hapoel Umm al-Fahm	2	(0)
2022–2023	Hapoel Ramat HaSharon	12	(0)
2024	Ihud Bnei Shefa-'Amr	7	(0)

International career
2009–2010	Israel U-16	9	(1)
2010–2011	Israel U-17	13	(0)
2011–2012	Israel U-18	5	(0)
2011–2012	Israel U-19	12	(0)
2013–2014	Israel U-21	1	(0)
- * Club domestic league appearances and goals as of 15 June 2023

Yarin Hassan (Hebrew: ירין חסן; born March 22, 1994) is an Israeli footballer.

== Club career ==
On 19 March 2021, he signed with Serie C club Bisceglie in Italy.

== Personal life ==
He is of Tunisian-Jewish descent.

== Honours ==
- Liga Leumit winner: 2013–14
- Israel State Cup runner-up: 2014
