= Hapoel Morasha Ramat HaSharon F.C. =

Israeli football club

Hapoel Morasha Ramat HaSharon
- Full name: Hapoel Morasha Ramat HaSharon Football Club הפועל מורשה רמת השרון
- Founded: 2011
- Dissolved: 2016
- Ground: Grundman Stadium, Ramat HaSharon
- Capacity: 4,300
- Chairman: Lior Siluk
- Manager: Yoel Ben Naim
- League: Liga Bet South A
- 2015–16: Liga Alef South, 16th (Relegated)
Home colours	Away colours

Hapoel Morasha Ramat HaSharon (Hebrew: הפועל מורשה רמת השרון) was an Israeli football club based in the Morasha neighbourhood of Ramat HaSharon. They are currently in Liga Alef South division, and play home matches at the Grundman Stadium.

== History ==
The club was founded in 2011. in their first season of existence, they won Liga Gimel Sharon division, and promoted to Liga Bet, after being undefeated, with 27 wins and 3 draws, scoring 155 goals and conceding 27. in their first season in Liga Bet, the club finished in the 7th place, and in the following season, the club made history by winning Liga Bet South A division, and were promoted to Liga Alef.

== Honours ==
=== League ===
Honour	No.	Years
Fourth tier	1	2013–14
Fifth tier	1	2011–12

=== Cups ===
Honour	No.	Years
Liga Gimel Sharon Division Cup	1	2011–12

== Notable former players ==
- Felix Halfon
- Tomer Shem-Tov
