= F.C. Pardes Hanna-Karkur =

Israeli football club

- Full name: Moadon Sport Pardes Hanna-Karkur מועדון ספורט פרדס חנה כרכור ליאור בוקר
- Founded: 1995 (Youth); 2010 (Senior)
- Ground: Municipal Stadium, Pardes Hanna-Karkur
- Chairman: Yeheskiel Holzheimer
- Manager: Uri Chausho
- League: Liga Bet North B
- 2023–24: Liga Bet North B, 7th
Home colours	Away colours	Third colours

F.C. Pardes Hanna-Karkur (Hebrew: מועדון ספורט פרדס חנה כרכור), Moadon Sport Pardes Hanna-Karkur, lit. Pardes Hanna-Karkur Sport Club (or in short Hebrew: מ.ס. פרדס חנה כרכור, Mem Samekh Pardes Hanna-Karkur, lit. F.C. Pardes Hanna-Karkur) is an Israeli football club based in Pardes Hanna-Karkur. The club currently plays in Liga Bet North B division.

The club is named after Israel Police Assistant Commissioner, Lior Boker, who perished in the 2010 Mount Carmel forest fire.

== History ==
The club was founded in 1995 and operated only a youth section, until 2010, when the senior side was created and joined Liga Gimel Samaria division.

The club finished runners-up in their debut season, a feat which they repeated in the 2011–12 and 2013–14 seasons, respectively. However, prior to the 2014–15 season, and after several vacancies were created in Liga Bet, the club achieved promotion to Liga Bet and was placed in the North B division, following the dissolution of Hapoel Yokneam, which merged with Liga Alef club, Maccabi Daliyat al-Karmel.
