= Oshri Levi =

Israeli footballer

Oshri Levi אושרי לוי
Personal information
- Full name: Oshri Levi
- Date of birth: 15 January 1974 (age 52)
- Place of birth: Hatzor HaGlilit, Israel
- Position: Goalkeeper

Team information
- Current team: Hapoel Karmiel
- Number: 52

Youth career
- Hatzor HaGlilit

Senior career*
Years	Team	Apps	(Gls)
1992–199x	Hatzor HaGlilit		
- Hapoel Majd al-Krum
- Bnei Sakhnin
1999–2001	Beitar Be'er Sheva		
2001–2002	Maccabi Tel Aviv	1	(0)
2002–2006	Hapoel Nazareth Illit	119	(0)
2006	Hapoel Kfar Saba	11	(0)
2007	Hapoel Bnei Lod	5	(0)
2008–2010	Ahva Arraba	26	(2)
2010	Hapoel Jerusalem	18	(0)
2010–2011	Ironi Tiberias	25	(0)
2011–2012	Hapoel Beit She'an	24	(5)
2012–2013	Hapoel Bnei Maghar	21	(2)
2013–2014	Sektzia Ma'alot Tarshiha	26	(0)
2014–2015	F.C. Tzeirei Kafr Kanna	23	(1)
2015–2016	F.C. Julis	22	(3)
2016	Ahva Arraba	1	(0)
2016–2017	Hapoel Nahariya	18	(1)
2017–2018	Maccabi Ahva Yarka	20	(2)
2018–2019	Hatzor HaGlilit	23	(1)
2019–2022	Hapoel Karmiel	23	(1)
2022	Hapoel Arraba	0	(0)
- * Club domestic league appearances and goals

Oshri Levi, (Hebrew: אושרי לוי; born 15 January 1974) is an Israeli footballer. As of 2013 Oshri plays football for Hapoel Karmiel in Liga Gimel and also plays basketball for Hapoel Ma'a lot in Liga Alef

He played for Hapoel Kfar Saba in the Israeli Premier League, but was sacked by the club on the suspicion that he threw a match against Maccabi Haifa.

Since 2018, Levi serves as Hapoel Karmiel F.C.'s professional manager

== Honours ==
- Israel State Cup:
  - Winner (1): 2002
- Liga Leumit:
  - Runner-up (1): 2003–04
- Liga Alef (North):
  - Winner (1): 2008-09
