= F.C. al-Nahda Nazareth =

Israeli football club

- Full name: Football Club al-Nahda Nazareth
- Founded: 2012
- Ground: Ilut Stadium
- Chairman: Abd Fatah Husseini
- Manager: Abd Alhman Sa'adi
- League: Liga Gimel North A
- 2023–24: Liga Bet North A, 15th
| Home colours | Away colours |

F.C. al-Nahda Nazareth (Arabic: نادي كرة قدم النهضه الناصره lit.: Football Club Renaissance Nazareth; Hebrew: מועדון כדורגל אל-נהדה נצרת) is an Israeli football club based in Nazareth. The club currently plays in Liga Bet North A division.

== History ==
The club was founded in 2012 and registered to play in Liga Gimel. In its first season, the club finished 8th in the Jezreel division and was eliminated from the cup in the 3rd round. The club won the division in the following season and won the divisional state cup and advancing to the 6th round of the State Cup. In its first season in Liga Bet, the club finished in 10th place.

== Honours ==
=== League ===
| Honour | No. | Years |
|---|---|---|
| Fifth tier | 1 | 2013–14 |

. 2025/2026 ליגה על

=== Cups ===
| Honour | No. | Years |
|---|---|---|
| Liga Gimel divisional State Cup | 1 | 2013–14 |
