= Maccabi Ahi Iksal F.C. =

Israeli football club

Maccabi Ahi Iksal
- Full name: Maccabi Ahi Iksal Football Club מכבי אחי איכסל
- Founded: 2006
- Ground: Iksal Ground, Iksal
- Chairman: Fahim Darawshe
- Manager: Mouad Nasir al-Din
- League: Liga Bet North B
- 2023–24: Liga Bet North B, 5th
Home colours	Away colours

Maccabi Ahi Iksal (Hebrew: מכבי אחי איכסל) is an Israeli football club based in Iksal. The club is currently in Liga Bet North B division.

The club is based almost entirely on local players.

== History ==
The club was founded in 2006 and joined Liga Gimel Samaria division, where they won the division cup in their first season of existence. In 2008–09, the club moved to the Jezreel division, where they finished on top of the division at the end of the season, and achieved promotion to Liga Bet.

In their first season in Liga Bet, the club finished fourth in the North B division and qualified for the promotion play-offs, where they lost in the first round to Hapoel Ramot Menashe Megiddo on penalties. In the 2012–13 season, the club finished runners-up and returned to the promotion play-offs, where they lost in the second round 0–1 to local rivals, Hapoel Iksal. In the following season, the club finished fourth and qualified once more for the promotion play-offs. After winning 1–0 against Hapoel Iksal and 4–2 against Hapoel Baqa al-Gharbiyye, the club advanced to the regional final, where they lost 1–3, after extra time, to Maccabi Sektzia Ma'alot-Tarshiha. In the following season, the club finished fifth and qualified for the fourth time for the promotion play-offs, where they lost in the first round 1–2 to Hapoel Daliyat al-Karmel.
