= F.C. Kiryat Gat =

Kiryat Gat Sports Club מועדון ספורט קריית גת
- Full name: Hapoel Kiryat Gat Football Club מ.ס. הפועל קריית גת
- Founded: 2008
- Dissolved: 2012
- Ground: Municipal Stadium, Kiryat Gat
- Capacity: 4,500
- Chairman: Moshe Sabbag
- 2011–12: Liga Bet South B, 5th
| Home colours | Away colours |

F.C. Hapoel Kiryat Gat (Hebrew: מ.ס. קריית גת) was an Israeli football team based in the southern city of Kiryat Gat. the club's best achievement was the fifth place in the fourth division, Liga Bet.

Currently, only the Women's section is operated by the club. the club is part of Hapoel Association, Since summer 2010.

== History ==
The club was founded after the dissolving of Beitar Kiryat Gat F.C., that merged with the Major Club in the city, Maccabi Kiryat Gat F.C. The club formed in Summer 2008. After the first season ever, the club was promoted from Liga Gimel to Liga Bet. At the 2011–12 season, the club finished in the fifth place in Liga Bet South B division. they did not enter Liga Bet in the 2012–13 season and dissolved.

== Women's section ==
The Women's section of the club founded in 2010 and joined the second division of women's football in Israel, Ligat Nashim Shniya. At the end of the 2012–13 season, the women's club promoted to the first division, Ligat Nashim Rishona, where they play today.
