= Hapoel Bnei Hurfeish F.C. =

Israeli football club

Hapoel Bnei Hurfeish
- Full name: Hapoel Bnei Hurfeish Football Club הפועל בני חורפיש
- Founded: 2013
- Ground: Peki'in
- Manager: Imad Fares
- League: Liga Gimel Upper Galilee
- 2015–16: 6th
Home colours	Away colours

Hapoel Bnei Hurfeish (Hebrew: הפועל בני חורפיש) is an Israeli football club based in the Hurfeish. The club currently plays in Liga Gimel Upper Galilee division.

== History ==
The club was established in 2013 as a revival of a defunct club, Hapoel Hurfeish, which operated until 2003, and in its best played in Liga Alef. The new club was placed in the Upper Galilee division of Liga Gimel, and finished 11th in its first season in the league, and 6th in its second season. In the cup, the club's best achievement is the fourth round, which doubles as the league cup final, where they lost in 2014–15 to Maccabi Nahf 1–5.

== Home ground ==
The club plays his home matches in the nearby village of Peki'in, as the old football stadium in the village, which was built in 1978, deemed unfit. Work on the renovation of the stadium began in 2013, but work was halted in early 2014 as the budget ran out, due to inadequate planning.
