= Ironi Modi'in F.C. =

Israeli football club

Ironi Modi'in
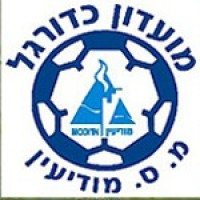
- Full name: Ironi Modi'in Football Club עירוני מודיעין
- Short name: Modi'in
- Founded: 2009
- Ground: Bat Yam Municipal Stadium
- Capacity: 3100
- Chairman: Ilan Jano
- Manager: Erez Benodis
- League: Liga Leumit
- 2025–26: Liga Leumit, 13th of 16
Home colours	Away colours

Ironi Modi'in (Hebrew: עירוני מודיעין) is an Israeli football club based in Modi'in-Maccabim-Re'ut. The club is currently in Liga Leumit

== History ==
A chart showing the progress of Ironi Modi'in through the Israeli football league system, from 2009–10 to the present

The club was founded in 2009 and played their first ever match on 11 September 2009, in which they won 5–1 against fellow Liga Gimel club, Maccabi Segev Shalom, at the second round of the 2009–10 Israel State Cup.

In 2011–12, their third season of existence, Modi'in won Liga Gimel Central division and were promoted to Liga Bet. In that season, the club also achieved a record victory, 21–0 against Hapoel Ramla.

Modi'in finished their debut season in Liga Bet at the seventh place of South B division. In the following season, they finished fourth and qualified for the promotion play-offs, where they beat Beitar Giv'at Ze'ev 1–0 in the first round. However, in the second round, they lost 0–1 to Hapoel Rahat and remained in Liga Bet.

The club's best placing to date came at the 2014–15 season, when they finished runners-up, one point behind the league winners, Bnei Eilat, and qualified for the promotion play-offs, where they beat Hapoel Merhavim 1–0 and Beitar Ma'ale Adumim 2–1 after extra time, and advanced to the regional final, where they lost 3–5 on penalties to Hapoel Kiryat Ono, after a goalless draw.

== Current Squad ==
As to 15 March 2026

No.	Pos.	Nation	Player
1	GK	ISR	Mikel Taytel
2	DF	ISR	Shalev Samareli
3	DF	ISR	Ofek Geller
6	MF	ISR	Eli Magar
7	FW	ISR	Guy Amsalem
8	MF	ISR	Sean Buskila
9	FW	SVN	Luka Štor
10	MF	ISR	Tomer Benbeinshti
11	DF	ISR	Maor Biton
14	FW	ISR	Shahar Hirsh
15	MF	ISR	Nir Lax
17	MF	ISR	Aleksander Sotaskov
18	GK	ISR	Roy Beigel

No.	Pos.	Nation	Player
19	MF	ISR	Avihay Wodaje
20	MF	ISR	Amir Sabag
21	DF	ISR	Georgi Kopraba
22	GK	ISR	Itamar Israeli
23	FW	ISR	Yarin Machluf
24	DF	CRO	Arian Mršulja
26	MF	ISR	Adir Maya
28	DF	ISR	Oz Zigler
30	MF	ISR	Mohammed Adam Mahamid
77	MF	ISR	Omer Senior
88	DF	ISR	Idan Avitov
99	MF	ISR	Michael Ben Ami

== Honours ==
- Liga Gimel Central:
  - 2011–12

== Notable managers ==
- Eli Cohen (born 1951)
