= Hapoel Ironi Baqa al-Gharbiyye F.C. =

Israeli football club

Hapoel Ironi Baqa al-Gharbiyye
- Full name: Hapoel Ironi Baqa al-Gharbiyye Football Club הפועל עירוני בקה אל גרבייה
- Founded: 1966; 2010 (Refounded)
- Ground: Baqa al-Gharbiyye Ground, Baqa al-Gharbiyye
- Chairman: Khaled Abu Farah
- Manager: Mohammed Awadi
- League: Liga Alef North
- 2024–25: Liga Alef North, 4th of 16
Home colours	Away colours

Hapoel Ironi Baqa al-Gharbiyye (Hebrew: הפועל עירוני בקה אל גרבייה) is an Israeli football club based in Baqa al-Gharbiyye. The club currently plays in Liga Alef North division.

== History ==
The club was founded in 2010, eight years after the previous Hapoel Baqa al-Gharbiyye club had folded at the end of the 2001–02 season, after last played in Liga Bet North B division.

The club finished the 2010–11 season on top of Liga Gimel Samaria division and achieved promotion to Liga Bet. The club's best placing to date, was achieved in the 2013–14 season, when they finished runners-up in the North B division, missing out on promotion to Liga Alef by a single point, to Ironi Nesher. The club qualified for the Promotion play-offs, where they beat Maccabi Kafr Qara 2–1 in the first round. However, in the second round, they lost 2–4 to Maccabi Ahi Iksal and remained in Liga Bet. At the same season, the club have qualified to the round of 32 of the Israel State Cup, in which clubs from the Israeli Premier League have entered the competition. However, they were drawn against Maccabi Sektzia Ma'alot-Tarshiha which played in Liga Bet North A division, and lost the match by a result of 2–4.

In the 2014–15 season, the club won Liga Bet North B division and made historic promotion to the third tier, Liga Alef.

== Honours ==
=== League ===
Honour	No.	Years
Fourth tier	1	2014–15
Fifth tier	2	1981–82, 2010–11
Sixth tier	1	1999–2000

=== Cups ===
Honour	No.	Years
Liga Bet North B Division Cup	2	2013–14, 2014–15
