= Hapoel Kaukab F.C. =

Israeli football club

Hapoel Kaubabi
- Full name: Hapoel Kaukab Football Club הפועל כאוכב هبوعيل كوكب
- Ground: Kaukab
- Chairman: Ali Khalil
- Manager: Hanna Farhud
- League: Liga Bet North A
- 2024–25: Liga Bet North A, 8th

Hapoel Kaukab (Hebrew: הפועל כאוכב Arabic: هبوعيل كوكب) is an Israeli football club based in Kaukab Abu al-Hija. The club is currently in Liga Bet North A division.

== History ==
The club played mostly in the lower divisions of Israeli football and enjoyed a brief spell in Liga Bet, then fifth tier, in the early 2000s before dropping back to bottom tier Liga Gimel. In 2007–08, the club won the Upper Galilee division of Liga Gimel and was promoted to Liga Bet. The club finished third in the division in 2011–12, its best position yet, but did not take part in promotion play-offs, as only the division champions participated in the play-offs that season. The following season, the club finished fourth and qualified to the promotion play-offs, knocking out Ironi Bnei Kabul and Bnei Arraba before falling in the regional final to Hapoel Iksal. In 2015, the club finished in 13th place and took part in relegation play-offs, winning its first match against Ahva Arraba to stay in the league.

== Honours ==
=== League ===
Honour	No.	Years
Sixth tier	1	2007–08
