= Maccabi Ironi Sderot F.C. =

Israeli football club

Maccabi Ironi Sderot
- Full name: Maccabi Ironi Sderot Football Club מכבי עירוני שדרות
- Founded: 1966
- Ground: Sderot Ground, Sderot
- Manager: Ofer Talker
- League: Liga Bet South B
- 2024–25: Liga Bet South B, 3rd
Home colours	Away colours

Maccabi Ironi Sderot (Hebrew: מכבי עירוני שדרות) is an Israeli football club based in Sderot. The club is currently in Liga Bet South B division.

== History ==
Maccabi Ironi Sderot played their entire history in the lower divisions of Israeli football.

A previous club named Maccabi Sderot, which also played in the lower divisions, was in existence between 1966 and 1973.

The current club was founded after Hapoel Sderot, which in its prime played in the second tier of Israeli football, dissolved in 1992.

Maccabi reached Liga Bet in the 2003–04 season, and played nine successive seasons in the South B division. In 2008–09, they finished runners-up, four points behind champions, Tzafririm Holon. Maccabi were relegated to Liga Gimel after they finished second bottom at the 2011–12 season. They bounced back to Liga Bet in the following season, after winning Liga Gimel Central-South division. However, they dropped back to Liga Gimel, after they lost in the 2013–14 Liga Bet South B Relegation play-offs to Ironi Beit Shemesh and Hapoel Arad.
