= Hapoel F.C. Sandala Gilboa =

Israeli football club

Hapoel Sandala Gilboa
- Full name: Hapoel Football Club Sandala Gilboa הפועל מועדון כדורגל סנדלה גלבוע
- Founded: 2011
- Ground: Gush Yael Stadium, Prazon
- Capacity: 700
- Chairman: Salah Omeri
- Manager: Issa Nujeidat
- League: Liga Bet North B
- 2024–25: Liga Bet North B, 13th

Hapoel Sandala Gilboa (Hebrew: הפועל סנדלה גלבוע); Arabic: هبوعيل صندلة جلبوع), is an Israeli football club based in Sandala, in the Gilboa Regional Council. The club is currently in Liga Bet North B division.

== History ==
The club was founded in 2011 and joined Liga Gimel Jerzreel division. In 2013–14, the club finished second in the division, after completing the season without losing a match, and was promoted to Liga Bet North B division, when a vacancy became available. The club finished its first season in Liga Bet in 9th place.

In the cup, the club won the divisional cup in 2012–13, advancing to the sixth round, where it lost to Sektzia Ma'alot-Tarshiha.

== Honours ==
=== Cups ===
Honour	No.	Years
Liga Gimel Jezreel Division Cup	1	2012–13
