= Bnei Yehud F.C. =

Israeli football club

Bnei Yehud
- Full name: Bnei Yehud Football Club בני יהוד
- Founded: 2007; 2009 (Merger)
- Ground: Kiryat Savionim, Yehud
- Chairman: Yosef Edri
- Manager: Tamir Ben Shoshan
- League: Liga Gimel Tel Aviv
- 2015–16: 5th
Home colours	Away colours

Bnei Yehud (Hebrew: בני יהוד) is an Israeli football club based in Yehud. The club is currently in Liga Gimel Tel Aviv division.

== History ==
The club was founded in 2007 as Bnei Shefi Yehud, a successor club to Maccabi Yehud, which was founded in 1954 and dissolved at the end of the 2006–07 season. A year later, in 2008, Hapoel Yehud was re-founded as Hapoel Ironi Yehud, and both clubs competed at the 2008–09 season in Liga Gimel Tel Aviv division. In 2009, Bnei Shefi Yehud merged with Hapoel Ironi Yehud, and the merged club became known as Hapoel Bnei Yehud, officially as Bnei Yehud.

In the 2011–12 season, Bnei Yehud finished runners-up in Liga Gimel Tel Aviv division and were eventually promoted to Liga Bet, after a vacancy was created in Liga Bet South B division, as F.C. Kiryat Gat joined a merger with Maccabi Kiryat Gat. However. the club's spell in Liga Bet lasted only one season, as they finished at the bottom of the South B division in the 2012–13 season, winning only two games, and relegated back to Liga Gimel.
