= Hapoel Kiryat Ono F.C. =

Israeli football club

Hapoel Kiryat Ono
- Full name: Hapoel Kiryat Ono Football Club הפועל קרית אונו
- Founded: 1952
- Ground: Kiryat Ono Stadium, Kiryat Ono
- Chairman: Yaniv Buchnik
- Manager: Udi Kabudi
- League: Liga Bet South A
- 2023–24: Liga Bet South A, 6th
Home colours	Away colours

Hapoel Kiryat Ono (Hebrew: הפועל קריית אונו) is an Israeli football club based in Kiryat Ono. They are currently in Liga Bet South A division.

== History ==
The club was founded in 1952 as Hapoel Kfar Ono. In 1954, as Regional council Kfar Ono became Local council Kiryat Ono, and as also in the same year, the club merged with Hapoel Bnei Brak, they were known as Hapoel Bnei Brak\Kiryat Ono. The club played under that name until the 1955–56 season, when they were promoted to Liga Bet, the third tier of Israeli football at the time. Since the 1956–57 season, the club is playing under its current name.

In the 1962–63 season, the club finished runners-up in Liga Bet North B division, and were promoted for the first time to Liga Alef, the second tier of Israeli football at the time, where they played for nine seasons in the South division, until they were relegated to Liga Bet at the end of the 1972–73 season. During their spell in Liga Alef, Hapoel achieved their best placing to date, which was the fourth place in the 1970–71 season.

In the 1977–78 season the club returned to Liga Alef. However, as Liga Artzit came into existence in the previous season, Liga Alef became the third tier of Israeli football. Hapoel played in the South division of Liga Alef until they were relegated at the end of the 1997–98 season.

In 1991, the club reached the semi-final of the Israel State Cup, where they lost 2–4 to Hapoel Petah Tikva.

Hapoel returned to Liga Alef after they won Liga Bet South A division in the 1998–99 season. However, they were relegated back to Liga Bet, after they finished third bottom in the 2001–02 season. In the 2006–07 season the club finished second bottom in Liga Bet South A division, and dropped to Liga Gimel, the lowest tier of Israeli football. At the end of the 2008–09 season, the club bounced back to Liga Bet, where they play now, after they finished runners-up in Liga Gimel Tel Aviv division.

The club was close to make a return to Liga Alef at the end of the 2014–15 season, when they finished fourth in Liga Bet South A division and qualified for the Promotion play-offs. After beating Hapoel Kafr Qasim Shouaa, Beitar Ramat Gan and Ironi Modi'in, they faced the 14th-placed club in Liga Alef South division, Maccabi Kabilio Jaffa, in the decisive promotion/relegation play-offs. Kiryat Ono lost 0–2 and remained in Liga Bet.

== Honours ==
=== League ===
Honour	No.	Years
Fourth tier	2	1976–77, 1998–99

== Notable former managers ==
- Arik Gilrovich
- Dror Kashtan
- Eran Kulik
