= Maccabi Ironi Acre F.C. =

Israeli football club

Maccabi Ironi Acre
- Full name: Maccabi Ironi Acre Football Club מכבי עירוני עכו
- Founded: 2008
- Ground: Acre Municipal Stadium, Acre
- Capacity: 5,000
- Chairman: Asher Ben Hamo
- Manager: Nissim Edri
- League: Liga Bet North A
- 2014–15: 3rd
Home colours	Away colours

Maccabi Ironi Acre (Hebrew: מכבי עירוני עכו) is an Israeli football club based in Acre. The club is currently in Liga Bet North A division and play at the Acre Municipal Stadium.

== History ==
The club was founded in 2008 and is distinct from the club formerly known as Maccabi Acre, which relocated to Kiryat Ata eight years earlier and renamed to Maccabi Ironi Kiryat Ata.

In their first season of existence, the club finished runners-up in Liga Gimel Upper Galilee division, and were promoted to Liga Bet, where they play since.

The club's best placing to date came at the 2014–15 season, when they finished third in Liga Bet North A division and qualified for the Promotion play-offs, where they beat Ahi Acre in a local derby by a result of 2–1 and Ironi Bnei Kabul by a result of 2–0, and advanced to the regional final, where they lost 2–4 to Hapoel Iksal.
