= Bnei Yeechalal Rehovot F.C. =

Israeli football club

Bnei Yeechalal Rehovot
- Full name: Bnei Yeechalal Rehovot Football Club בני יצ'אלאל רחובות
- Founded: 2007
- Ground: Kiryat Moshe, Rehovot
- Chairman: Abay Zauda
- Manager: Hezi Rashti
- League: Liga Gimel
- 2023–24: Liga Gimel Central, 4th
Home colours	Away colours

Bnei Yeechalal Rehovot (Hebrew: בני יצ'אלאל רחובות) is an Israeli football club based in Rehovot. The club is currently in Liga Bet South B division.

== Background ==
Yeechalal (which means "Everything is possible" in the Amharic language), The Community Association of Ethiopian Immigrants for Advancement in Sport, was founded in 2000, in order to promote sports amongst youth from the Ethiopian immigrants community in Israel and take responsibility over their future.

== History ==
Bnei Yeechalal Rehovot Football Club was founded in 2007 and joined Liga Gimel. In 2008–09, their second season of existence, the club finished on top of Liga Gimel Central division, level on points with Hapoel Rahat and F.C. Kiryat Gat, and had to face both clubs in a three-way promotion play-off. Bnei Yeechalal remained in Liga Gimel, after they lost both matches, 2–3 to F.C. Kiryat Gat and 1–3 to Hapoel Rahat. However, in the following season, they won their division and were promoted to Liga Bet.

The club's best placing to date was the sixth place in Liga Bet South B division, which was achieved in the 2014–15 season.

== Honours ==
=== League ===
Honour	No.	Years
Fifth tier	1	2009–10

=== Cups ===
Honour	No.	Years
Liga Bet divisional State Cup	1	2015–16
Liga Gimel divisional State Cup	1	2009–10
