= Hapoel Kafr Qasim Shouaa F.C. =

Israeli football club

Hapoel Kafr Qasim Shouaa
- Full name: Hapoel Kafr Qasim Shouaa Football Club הפועל כפר קאסם שועאע
- Founded: 2006
- Ground: Maccabi Kafr Qasim Ground, Kafr Qasim
- Chairman: Walid Badawi
- Manager: Itzhak Shaki
- League: Liga Bet South A
- 2024–25: Liga Bet South A, 11th
Home colours	Away colours

Hapoel Kafr Qasim Shouaa (Hebrew: הפועל כפר קאסם שועאע) is an Israeli football club based in Kafr Qasim. They are currently in Liga Bet South A division.

== History ==
The club was founded in 2006 and played eight seasons in Liga Gimel, the lowest tier of Israeli football, up until the 2013–14 season, when the club won Liga Gimel Sharon division and were promoted to Liga Bet. At the same season, they faced F.C. Kafr Qasim (played in Liga Alef) in a derby, in the sixth round of the Israel State Cup. Shouaa were defeated by a result of 0–1.

The club finished its first season in Liga Bet in the third place of South A division and qualified for the promotion play-offs, where they lost in the first round to Hapoel Kiryat Ono on penalties, after 2–2 draw in 120 minutes.

== Honours ==
=== League ===
Honour	No.	Years
Fifth tier	1	2013–14

=== Cups ===
Honour	No.	Years
Liga Gimel Sharon Division Cup	1	2013–14
