= F.C. Rishon LeZion =

Israeli football club

- Full name: Mo'adon Sport Rishon LeZion מועדון ספורט ראשון לציון
- Founded: 2007
- Ground: Superland West, Rishon LeZion
- League: Liga Gimel
- 2023–24: Liga Gimel Central, 8th

F.C. Rishon LeZion (Hebrew: מועדון ספורט ראשון לציון), is an Israeli football club based in Rishon LeZion. The club is currently in Liga Gimel Central division.

== History ==
The club was founded in 2007 and joined Liga Gimel Central division, where they play ever since, usually finishing at the bottom of the table. The club's best placing came in 2009–10, when it finished 8th in the league.

In the cup, the club had never made it past the fourth round, which is its best achievement, having lost in the fourth round, which also serves as the division league cup final, in 2009–10 to Bnei Yeechalal Rehovot.
