= Ironi Bnei Kabul F.C. =

Israeli football club

Ironi Bnei Kabul
- Full name: Ironi Bnei Kabul Football Club עירוני בני כאבול
- Founded: 2010
- Ground: Kabul Ground, Kabul
- Chairman: Ibrahim Rian
- Manager: Mohammed Salah
- League: Liga Bet North A
- 2023–24: Liga Bet North A, 5th
| Home colours | Away colours |

Ironi Bnei Kabul (Hebrew: עירוני בני כאבול) is an Israeli football club based in Kabul. The club is the result of the merger of two local rivals, Hapoel Bnei Kabul and Maccabi Ironi Kabul. They are currently in Liga Bet North A division.

== History ==
The club was founded in 2010 as the result of the merger of Hapoel Bnei Kabul, which finished the 2009–10 season as runners-up in Liga Gimel Upper Galilee division and were promoted to Liga Bet after a spot was vacated in that league, and Maccabi Ironi Kabul, which were relegated at the same season from Liga Bet to Liga Gimel. The merged club inherited Hapoel's spot in Liga Bet.

The club finished its first season in Liga Bet at the fifth place of North A division and qualified for the Promotion play-offs, where they beat Hapoel Ihud Bnei Sumei by a result of 2–1 and F.C. Ahva Kafr Manda by a result of 2–0, and advanced to the regional final, where they lost 2–3 to F.C. Givat Olga. Two seasons later, the club finished in the third place and qualified once more for the Promotion play-offs, where they lost 1–2 in the first round to Hapoel Kaukab. In the 2014–15 season, the club reached its best placing to date, when they finished as runners-up and qualified for their third Promotion play-offs, where in the first round, they had beaten Beitar Haifa by a result of 1–0 after extra time and lost 0–2 to Maccabi Ironi Acre in the second round.

== Honours ==
=== League ===
| Honour | No. | Years |
|---|---|---|
| Fifth tier | 1 | 1996–97^{1} |
| Sixth tier | 1 | 2005–06^{2} |

^{1}Achieved by Hapoel Kabul
^{2}Achieved by Maccabi Kabul

=== Cups ===
| Honour | No. | Years |
|---|---|---|
| Liga Bet North A Division Cup | 1 | 2015–16 |
