= F.C. Tzeirei Tur'an =

Israeli football club

- Full name: Football Club Tzeirei Tur'an
- Founded: 2009
- Ground: Kafr Kanna Stadium
- Manager: Fadel Wahab
- League: Liga Bet North B
- 2018–19: Liga Bet North B, 16th (folded)

F.C. Tzeirei Tur'an (Hebrew: מועדון כדורגל צעירי טורעאן) is an Israeli football club based in Tur'an. The club currently plays in Liga Bet North B division.

== History ==
The club was founded in 2009, following the closure of Maccabi Tur'an, at the end of the 2007–08 season and registered to play in Liga Gimel, where it was placed in the Upper Galilee division. The club finished 5th in the division in its first two seasons and was transferred to the Jezreel Division before the 2011–12 season and was promoted to Liga Bet after winning a play-off against Hapoel Bnei Nujeidat, as the teams were tied at the top of the table. The club had played in North B division of Liga Bet ever since.
