= 2019 Israel State Cup final =

2018-19 Israel State Cup finale

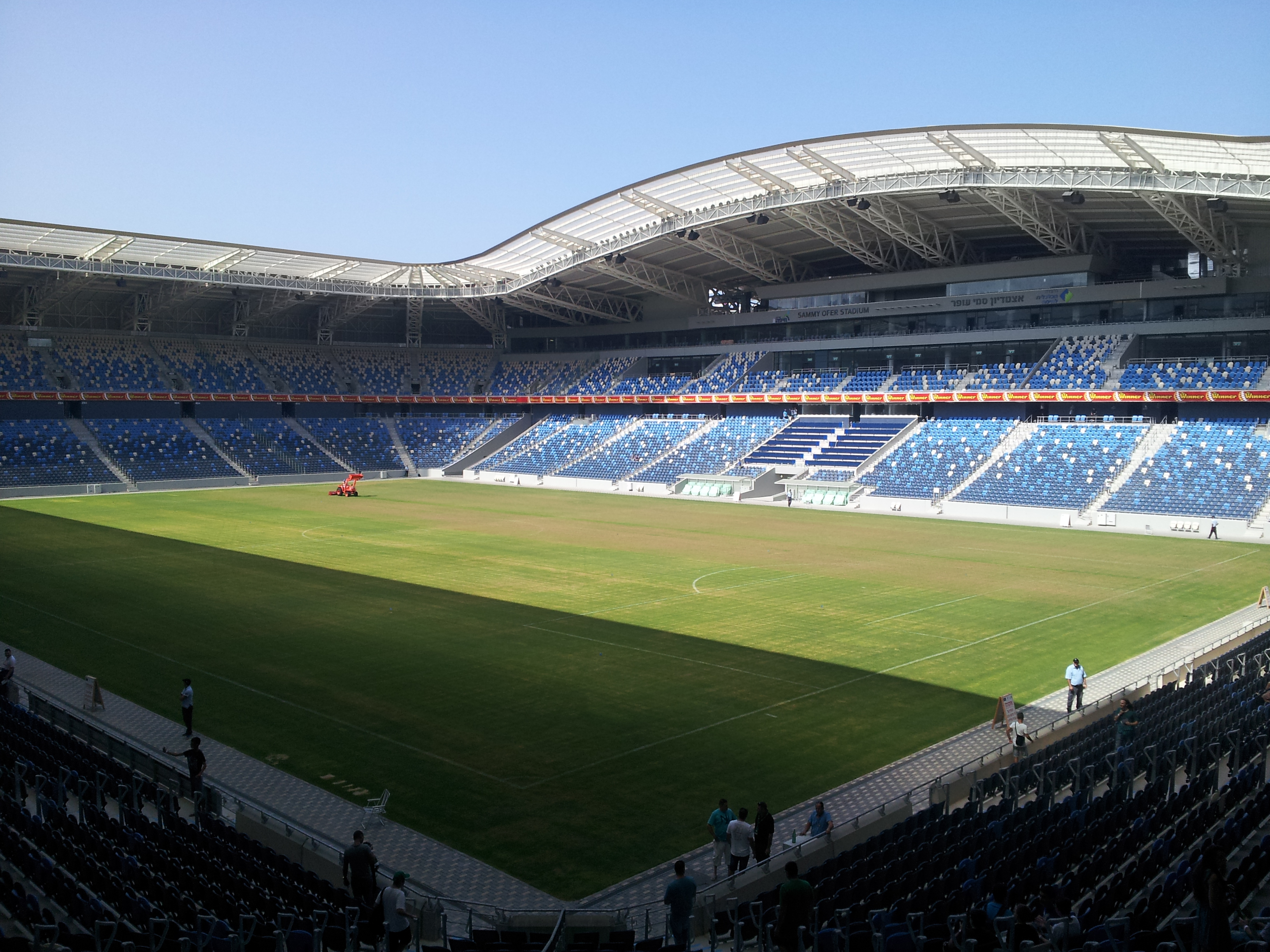
- Sammy Ofer Stadium in Haifa hosted the final
- Event: 2018–19 Israel State Cup
Bnei Yehuda Tel Aviv	Maccabi Netanya
1	1
- After extra time Bnei Yehuda won 5–4 on penalties
- Date: 15 May 2019
- Venue: Sammy Ofer, Haifa
- Referee: Eitan Shemeulevitch

The 2019 Israel State Cup final decided the winner of the 2018–19 Israel State Cup, the 83rd season of Israel's main football cup. It was played on 15 May 2019 at the Sammy Ofer Stadium in Haifa, between Maccabi Netanya and Bnei Yehuda.

Bnei Yehuda defeated Maccabi Netanya 5–4 on penalties.

== Background ==
Maccabi Netanya had previously played 4 Israel cup Finals, had won the competition a record 1 time. Their most recent appearance in the final was in 2014, in which they lost 1–0 to Ironi Kiryat Shmona, and their most recent victory in the tournament was in 1978, beating Bnei Yehuda 2–1.

Bnei Yehuda had previously played in 7 finals, winning 3. Their most recent appearance in the final was tin 2017, in which they won 4–3 on penalties against Maccabi Tel Aviv.

Maccabi Netanya and Bnei Yehuda had played each other one time was in 1978, Maccabi Netanya won 2–1.

The two teams played each other three times during the 2018–19 Israeli Premier League season until the final. In the first instance Bnei Yehuda won 3–1, in the two other times the games end draw 1-1 and 0-0.

== Road to the final ==
Bnei Yehuda		Round	Maccabi Netanya
Opponent	Result	2018–19 Israel State Cup	Opponent	Result
Beitar Nordia Jerusalem	3–1	Eighth round	F.C. Daburiyya	5–1
Hapoel Nazareth Illit	2–0	Round of 16	Hapoel Be'er Sheva	0–0 (4–2) after penalties
Hapoel Afula	2–0	Quarter-finals first leg	Maccabi Petah Tikva	1–0
Hapoel Afula	1–1	Quarter-finals second leg	Maccabi Petah Tikva	1–1
Maacbi Tel Aviv	1–0	Semi-finals	Hapoel Hadera	1–0

=== Details ===
15 May 2019
20:55 CEST

Bnei Yehuda	1–1	Maccabi Netanua
Jan 82'	Report	Melamed 4'
Penalties
Jan (penalty scored); Haziza (penalty scored); Sagas (penalty scored); Zenati (penalty scored); Ashkenazi (penalty scored)	5–4	Finish (penalty scored); Barshazki (penalty scored); Heubach (penalty scored); Nico Olsak (penalty scored); Kanichowsky (penalty missed)

Sammy Ofer Stadium, Haifa
Referee: Eitan Shemeulevitch

Bnei Yehuda	Maccabi Netanya

GK	1	(Lithuania) Emilijus Zubas
RB	17	(Israel) Itzik Azuz (c) (substituted off) 56'
CB	24	(Spain) Carlos Cuéllar (substituted off) 75'
CB	2	(Israel) Dan Mori
CB	7	(Israel) Shay Konstantini
LB	23	(Israel) Matan Baltaxa
CM	19	(Ivory Coast) Ismaila Soro (substituted off) 29'
LM	6	(Israel) Yuval Ashkenazi
RW	9	(Israel) Dolev Haziza
CF	13	(Republic of the Congo) Mavis Tchibota (yellow card) 61'
LF	12	(Slovakia) Jakub Sylvestr (substituted off) 100'
Substitutes:
GK	55	(Israel) Yehonatan Shabi
DF	26	(Israel) Amit Bitton (substituted on) 56'
MF	21	(Israel) Sagas Tambi (substituted on) 29'
FW	10	(Israel) Amit Zenati (substituted on) 100'
MF	22	(Israel) Avishay Cohen
FW	18	(Israel) Dor Jan (substituted on) 75'
FW	89	(Serbia) Fejsal Mulić
Manager:
(Israel) Yossi Abuksis

GK	82	(Israel) Danny Amos
RB	24	(Israel) Muhammed Zbidat (substituted off) 69'
CB	31	(Germany) Tim Heubach
CB	13	(Serbia) Branko Vrgoč (yellow card) 110'
LB	12	(United States) Jonathan Bornstein (yellow card) 82'
DM	52	(Niger) Ali Mohamed (yellow card) 33' (substituted off) 51'
CM	77	(Israel) Nico Olsak (c) (yellow card) 102'
CM	8	(Albania) Jahmir Hyka (substituted off) 106'
RW	36	(Israel) Gavriel Kanichowsky
LW	10	(Israel) Guy Melamed (substituted off) 73'
CF	21	(Montenegro) Fatos Bećiraj (yellow card) 62'
Substitutes:
GK	22	(Israel) Golan Elkaslasy
DF	3	(Israel) Dudu Twito
DF	25	(Israel) David Tiram
MF	15	(Israel) Aviv Avraham (substituted on) 73' (yellow card) 85'
DF	20	(Israel) Dolev Azulay (substituted on) 69' (red card) 120'
MF	70	(Israel) Moti Barshazki (substituted on) 106'
FW	30	(Israel) Stav Finish (yellow card) 54' (substituted on) 51'
Manager:
(Serbia) Slobodan Drapić
