= 2017 Israel State Cup final =

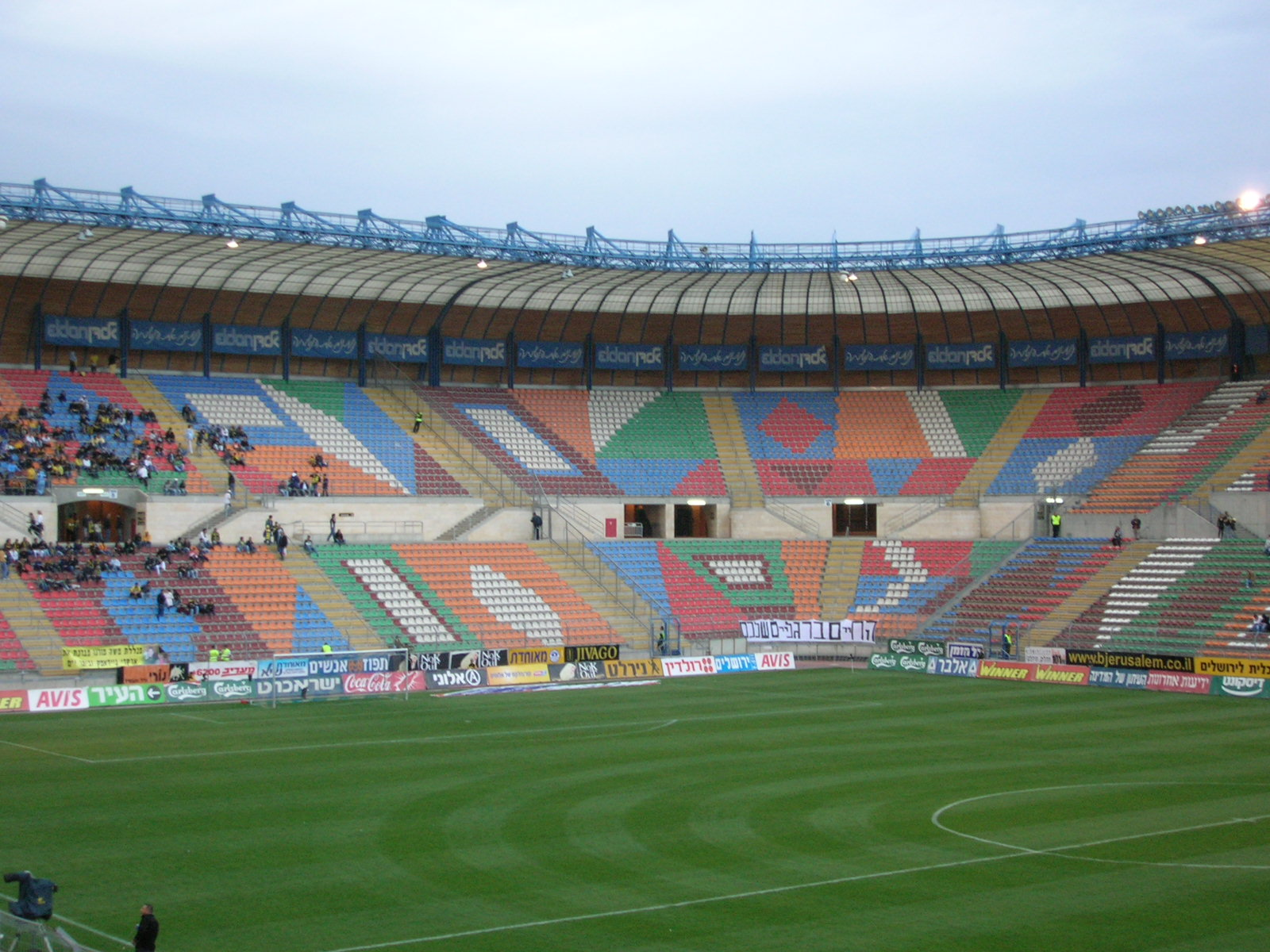
- Teddy Stadium in Jerusalem hosted the final
- Event: 2016–17 Israel State Cup
Maccabi Tel Aviv	Bnei Yehuda Tel Aviv
1	1
- After extra time Bnei Yehuda won 4–3 on penalties
- Date: 25 May 2017
- Venue: Teddy, Jerusalem

The 2017 Israel State Cup final decided the winner of the 2016–17 Israel State Cup, the 81st season of Israel's main football cup. It will be played on 25 May 2017 at the Teddy Stadium in Jerusalem, between Maccabi Tel Aviv and Bnei Yehuda Tel Aviv.

Maccabi Tel Aviv had previously played 35 Israel cup Finals, had won the competition a record 23 times. Their most recent appearance in the final was two years ago, in which they won 6–2 to Hapoel Beer Sheva at Sammy Ofer in Haifa. and their most recent appearance in the tournament the previous year's edition, in which they lost 1–0 to Maccabi Haifa.

Bnei Yehuda had previously played in 6 finals, winning 2. Their most recent final was in 2010, lost 3-1 to Hapoel Tel Aviv. Their most recent victory was in 1981, beating 4-3 in Penalties Hapeol Tel Aviv.

Maccabi Tel Aviv and Bnei Yehuda had played each other one time was in 1965, Maccabi Tel Aviv won 2-1.

The two teams played each other twice during the 2016–17 Israeli Premier League season. In the first instance, at Haberfeld Stadium on 27 November 2016 Bnei Yehuda won 1–0, Almog Buzaglo scoring. On 27 February 2017 at Netanya Stadium Maccabi Tel Aviv won 2–0, Barak Itzhaki and Viðar Örn Kjartansson scoring.

== Road to the final ==
Maccabi Tel Aviv		Round	Bnei Yehuda Tel Aviv
Opponent	Result	2016–17 Israel State Cup	Opponent	Result
Hapoel Bnei Lod	3–0	Eighth round	Hapoel Acre	3–3 (4–3) after penalties
Hapoel Ra'anana	1–1 (4–2) after penalties	Round of 16	Hapoel Ashkelon	4–0
Maccabi Petah Tikva	1–0	Quarter-finals first leg	F.C. Ashdod	4-1
Maccabi Petah Tikva	2–1	Quarter-finals second leg	F.C. Ashdod	2-0
Beitar Jerusalem F.C.	2–1	Semi-finals	Hapoel Ramat Gan	1–0

=== Details ===
25 May 2017
21:00 CEST

Maccabi Tel Aviv	0–0	Bnei Yehuda Tel Aviv
	Report
Penalties
Alberman (penalty scored); Rikan (penalty scored); Kjartansson (penalty scored); Scarione (penalty missed); Benayoun (penalty missed); Ben Haim I (penalty missed)	3–4	Valskis (penalty missed); Jovanović (penalty scored); Buzaglo (penalty scored); Gordana (penalty missed); Cohen (penalty scored); Finish (penalty scored)

Teddy Stadium, Jerusalem
Attendance: 27,800
Referee: Eli Hachmon

Maccabi Tel Aviv	Bnei Yehuda Tel Aviv

GK	95	(Serbia) Predrag Rajković
RB	2	(Israel) Eli Dasa (yellow card) 98'
CB	18	(Israel) Eitan Tibi
CB	26	(Israel) Tal Ben Haim
LB	13	(Israel) Sheran Yeini (c)
DM	23	(Israel) Eyal Golasa (yellow card) 101'
CM	6	(Israel) Gal Alberman (yellow card) 105'
LM	14	(Portugal) Rúben Micael (yellow card) 79' (substituted off) 83'
RW	15	(Israel) Dor Micha (substituted off) 100'
CF	9	(Iceland) Viðar Örn Kjartansson
LF	11	(Israel) Tal Ben Haim (substituted off) 108'
Substitutes:
GK	1	(Israel) Daniel Lifshitz
DF	4	(Brazil) Ramon
MF	21	(Belarus) Egor Filipenko
DF	22	(Israel) Avi Rikan (substituted on) 83'
MF	51	(Israel) Yossi Benayoun (substituted on) 100'
FW	5	(Argentina) Óscar Scarione (substituted on) 108'
FW	25	(Israel) Aaron Schoenfeld
Manager:
(Angola) Lito Vidigal

GK	1	(Lithuania) Emilijus Zubas
RB	31	(Serbia) Marko Jovanović
CB	6	(Israel) Tal Kachila
CB	13	(Israel) Sean Goldberg
LB	23	(Israel) Maor Kandil (yellow card) 2' (substituted off) 77'
DM	14	(The Gambia) Tijan Jaiteh
CM	10	(Israel) Roei Gordana (c)
CM	51	(Croatia) Antonio Mršić (yellow card) 54' (substituted off) 112'
RW	7	(Israel) Alon Turgeman (substituted off) 84'
LW	21	(Lithuania) Nerijus Valskis
CF	15	(Israel) Yonatan Cohen (yellow card) 39'
Substitutes:
GK	22	(Russia) Nikita Khaykin
DF	17	(Israel) Itzik Azuz (substituted on) 77'
DF	55	(Israel) Shay Konstantini
FW	27	(Israel) Daniel Avital
MF	77	(Israel) Almog Buzaglo (substituted on) 84'
FW	28	(Israel) Stav Finish (substituted on) 112'
FW	20	(Argentina) Pedro Galván
Manager:
(Israel) Kfir Edri
