= Amit Bitton =

Israeli footballer

Personal information
- Date of birth: 24 July 1996 (age 30)
- Place of birth: Be'er Sheva, Israel
- Height: 1.90 m (6 ft 3 in)
- Position: Centre-back

Team information
- Current team: Dimona

Youth career
- 2006–2016: Hapoel Be'er Sheva

Senior career*
Years	Team	Apps	(Gls)
2016–2021	Hapoel Be'er Sheva	19	(0)
2017	→ Hapoel Tel Aviv	13	(0)
2017–2018	→ Hapoel Acre	14	(2)
2018–2019	→ Ashdod	18	(2)
2019	→ Bnei Yehuda	11	(0)
2022	Beroe	1	(0)
2022–2023	Bnei Yehuda	34	(2)
2023–2024	Hapoel Ramat Gan	35	(1)
2024–	Dimona	21	(1)

International career
2017–2018	Israel U21	14	(0)
- * Club domestic league appearances and goals as of 29 May 2025

Amit Bitton (or Biton, Hebrew: עמית ביטון; born 24 July 1996) is an Israeli footballer who plays as a centre back for Third Israeli League club Dimona.

== Early life ==
Bitton was born in Be'er Sheva, Israel, to a family of Moroccan Jewish descent. He is the son of former Israeli footballer and manager Shimon Bitton.

He also holds a Portuguese passport, which eased his move to certain European football leagues.

== Club career ==
Bitton grew up in the youth division of Hapoel Be'er Sheva. On 2 March 2016, the 2015–16 season, Bitton made his debut in the Hapoel Be'er Sheva alumni team in a 2–0 victory over Beitar Tel Aviv Ramla in the State Cup.

In the 2016–17 season, Bitton was finally promoted to the senior team. In 30 July Bitton made his debut in the Toto Cup in a 5–0 win over Hapoel Ashkelon. Bitton managed to win 7 games in the Toto Cup and win the title after a 4–1 win over Ironi Kiryat Shmona. In the winter transfer window was borrowed from Bitton Hapoel Tel Aviv until the end of the season. On 21 January 2017 Bitton made his debut in a 1–0 win over Hapoel Ashkelon. Later in the season he managed 13 appearances for Hapoel Tel Aviv.

In the 2017–18 season, Bitton was loaned to Hapoel Acre until the end of the season. In 30 July he made his debut in the Toto Cup with a 4–0 loss to the Ironi Kiryat Shmona. In 20 August Bitton made his debut in a 2–1 loss to Bnei Sakhnin. During the game, Bitton scored his first goal in a team of alumni. In the winter transfer window was borrowed from Bitton Ashdod until the end of the season. On 7 February 2018 Bitton made his debut in Ashdod in the first game of the quarterfinals of the State Cup in a 1–1 draw against Hapoel Ra'anana. In 29 April Bitton made his debut in the Premier League in a 1–0 win over Hapoel Ashkelon.

In the 2018–19 season, Bitton was loaned back to Ashdod until the end of the season. In 1 August Bitton made his debut for this season with a 3–0 loss to Maccabi Petah Tikva. In 25 August Bitton made his debut for this season in a 1–0 win for Bnei Yehuda in the Premier League. In the winter transfer window was borrowed from Bitton Bnei Yehuda until the end of the season. On 10 February 2019 Bitton made his debut in Bnei Yehuda 4–0 win over Hapoel Hadera in the Premier League. Later in the season in 15 May he won the State Cup with Bnei Yehuda after a 4–5 win in penalties.

== Honours ==
Bnei Yehuda

- State Cup (1): 2018–19

Hapoel Be'er Sheva

- State Cup (1): 2019–20
