= Ehud Kachila =

Israeli footballer

Ehud Kachila אהוד כחילה
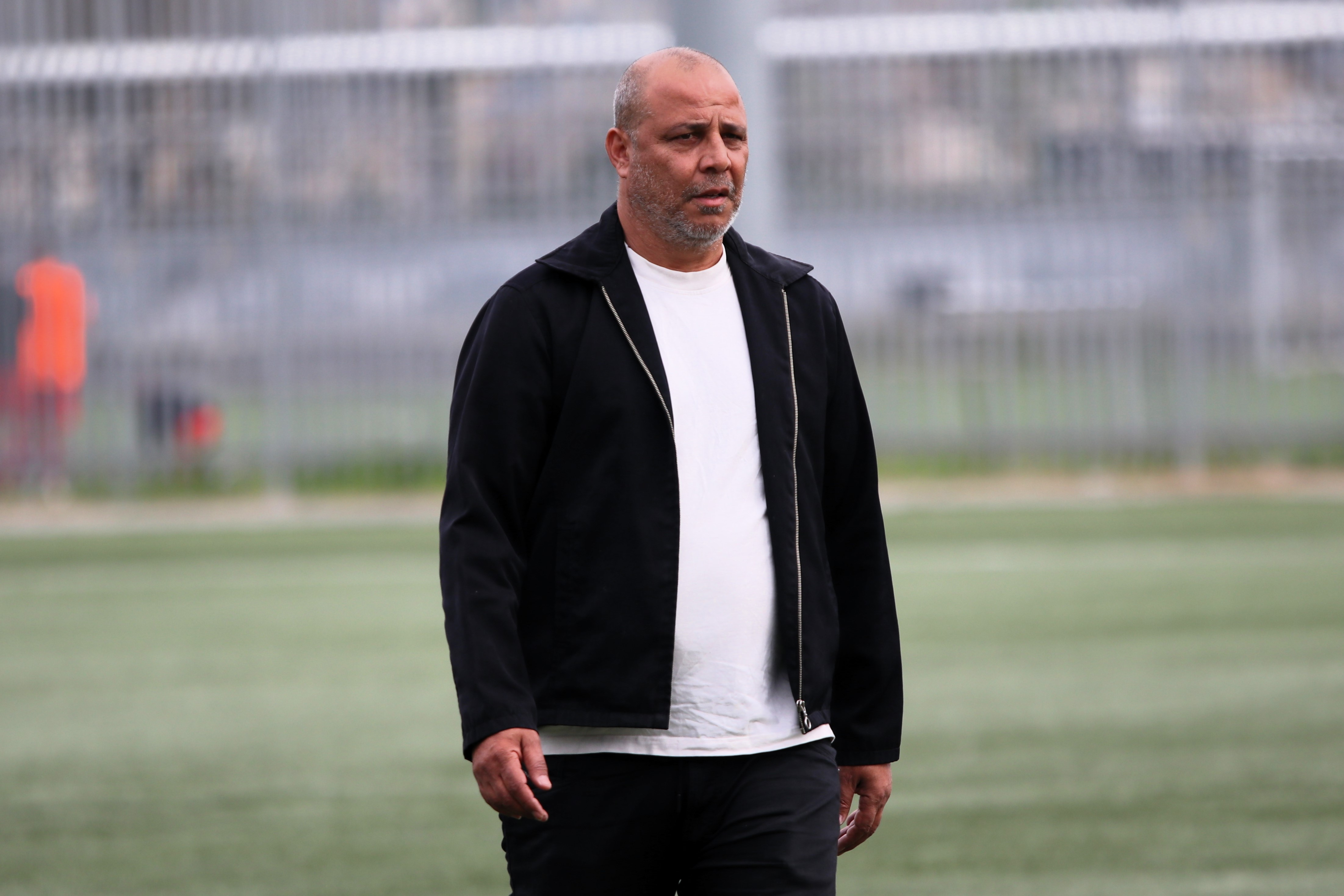

Personal information
- Full name: Ehud Kachila
- Date of birth: 13 July 1968 (age 58)
- Place of birth: Jerusalem, Israel
- Position: Centre-back

Youth career
- Hapoel Jerusalem

Senior career*
Years	Team	Apps	(Gls)
1987–1990	Beitar Jerusalem		
1990–1991	Hapoel Hadera		
1991–1998	Beitar Jerusalem		
1997–1998	→ Hapoel Be'er Sheva		
1998	Hapoel Kfar Saba		
1998–1999	Hapoel Tel Aviv		
1999–2000	Beitar Jerusalem		
2000–2001	Hapoel Petah Tikva		
2001	→ Ironi Rishon LeZion		
2001–2002	Bnei Yehuda		
2002–2003	Beitar Jerusalem		
2003–2004	Maccabi Herzliya		

Managerial career
- 2005–2006: Maccabi Be'er Sheva (youth)
- 2006–2008: Maccabi Be'er Sheva
- 2008–2010: Maccabi Ironi Netivot
- 2011–2012: Maccabi Ironi Netivot
- 2012–2013: Maccabi Be'er Sheva
- 2014–2015: Maccabi Ironi Netivot
- 2015–2018: F.C. Dimona
- 2018–2019: Ironi Modi'in
- 2020–2022: Maccabi Ironi Netivot
- 2022–2024: Beitar Nordia Jerusalem
- 2024–: F.C. Dimona
- * Club domestic league appearances and goals

Ehud Kachila (Hebrew: אהוד כחילה; born 13 July 1968) is an Israeli former professional footballer who played as a centre-back. Kachila is the father of footballer Tal Kachila.

== Club career ==
Kachila was born in the Katamon neighbourhood of Jerusalem. He started playing football in the Hapoel Jerusalem's youth and signed the senior team in 1987.

In 1991, he signed to Beitar Jerusalem when it played in the Israeli second division. At the end of the season he was promoted to the Israeli first division and later won the championship.

In June 2000, he signed for Hapoel Petah Tikva, But during the season moved to Ironi Rishon LeZion.

== Honours ==
=== Club ===
Beitar Jerusalem

- Israel Championship (2): 1992–93, 1996–97

Hapoel Tel Aviv

- Israel State Cup (1): 1998–99
