= 2018–19 Israel State Cup =

Tournament details
- Country: Israel

Final positions
- Champions: Bnei Yehuda
- Runners-up: Maccabi Netanya

Tournament statistics
- Matches played: 144
- Goals scored: 531 (3.69 per match)

The 2018–19 Israel State Cup (Hebrew: גביע המדינה, Gvia HaMedina) is the 80th season of Israel's nationwide Association football cup competition and the 65th after the Israeli Declaration of Independence.

The competition commenced in September 2018.

== Preliminary rounds ==
=== First to fourth rounds ===
Rounds 1 to 4 double as cup competition for each division in Liga Bet and Liga Gimel. The two third-Round winners from each Liga Bet division and the fourth-Round winner from each Liga Gimel division advance to the sixth Round.

==== Liga Bet ====
===== Liga Bet North A =====
Home team	Score	Away team
First Round
Second Round
Beitar Nahariya	4–0	Maccabi Ahva Yarka
Maccabi Sektzia Ma'alot-Tarshiha	3–0	F.C. Ahva Kafr Manda
Maccabi Ironi Tamra	0–2	Ironi Bnei Kabul
F.C. Bnei M.M.B.E.	1–2	Ihud Bnei Majd al-Krum
Third Round
Beitar Nahariya	2–0	Ironi Bnei Kabul
Ihud Bnei Majd al-Krum	1–3	Maccabi Sektzia Ma'alot-Tarshiha
Fourth Round
Beitar Nahariya	0–4	Maccabi Sektzia Ma'alot-Tarshiha

Maccabi Sektzia Ma'alot-Tarshiha won the district cup and qualified along with Beitar Nahariya to the sixth round.

===== Liga Bet North B =====
Home team	Score	Away team
First Round
Hapoel Bnei 'Ara Ar'ara	w/o	Tzeri Ironi Baqa
Hapoel Bnei Fureidis	1–3	Maccabi Bnei Raina
Ihud Bnei Kafr Qara	0–3 (a.e.t.)	Hapoel Bnei Musmus
Ihud Bnei Baqa	3–1	Al-Nahda Nazareth
Second Round
Maccabi Bnei Raina	1–0	Hapoel Bnei 'Ara Ar'ara
Hapoel Tirat HaCarmel	1 – 2 (a.e.t.)	Hapoel Ramot Menashe Megiddo
Hapoel Bnei Musmus	0–2	Maccabi Nujeidat
F.C. Daburiyya	7–1	Ihud Bnei Baqa
Third Round
Maccabi Nujeidat	0–1	Maccabi Bnei Raina
Hapoel Ramot Menashe Megiddo	0–5	F.C. Daburiyya
Fourth Round
Maccabi Bnei Raina	0–4	F.C. Daburiyya

F.C. Daburiyya won the district cup and qualified along with Maccabi Bnei Raina to the sixth round.

===== Liga Bet South A =====
Home team	Score	Away team
First Round
Hapoel Kiryat Ono	2 – 3 (a.e.t.)	Beitar Petah Tikva
Hapoel Kafr Bara	0–0 (a.e.t.) (5–4 p)	Hapoel Ihud Bnei Jatt
Hapoel Kafr Qasim Shouaa	4–0	F.C. Tzeirei Tayibe
Hapoel Nahlat Yehuda	0–3	F.C. Ironi Or Yehuda
Shimshon Bnei Tayibe	0–2	Hapoel Hod HaSharon
Ironi Beit Dagan	6–1	F.C. Roei Heshbon Tel Aviv
F.C. Bnei Jaffa Ortodoxim	4–1	Beitar Ramat Gan
Maccabi Amishav Petah Tikva	0–1	Shimshon Tel Aviv
Second Round
Hapoel Kafr Qasim Shouaa	3–1	Hapoel Kafr Bara
F.C. Ironi Or Yehuda	7–0	F.C. Bnei Jaffa Ortodoxim
Beitar Petah Tikva	0–6	Shimshon Tel Aviv
Ironi Beit Dagan	0–3	Hapoel Hod HaSharon
Third Round
Shimshon Tel Aviv	0–0 (a.e.t.) (3–1 p)	F.C. Ironi Or Yehuda
Hapoel Hod HaSharon	2–0	Hapoel Kafr Qasim Shouaa
Fourth Round
Shimshon Tel Aviv	0–1	Hapoel Hod HaSharon

Hapoel Hod HaSharon won the district cup and qualified along with Shimshon Tel Aviv to the sixth round.

===== Liga Bet South B =====
Home team	Score	Away team
First Round
F.C. Dimona	3–0	Bnei Eilat
F.C. Shikun HaMizrah	2–1	Maccabi Kiryat Malakhi
Maccabi Ironi Netivot	0 – 1 (a.e.t.)	Hapoel Yeruham
Maccabi Ironi Ashdod	4–1	Bnei Yeechalal Rehovot
Beitar Kiryat Gat	1–0	F.C. Ironi Kuseife
F.C. Be'er Sheva	1–0	Maccabi Ironi Sderot
Second Round
Hapoel Yeruham	0–2	Beitar Kiryat Gat
F.C. Dimona	5–2	F.C. Be'er Sheva
Ironi Modi'in	2–2 (a.e.t.) (4–1 p)	Maccabi Ironi Ashdod
F.C. Shikun HaMizrah	0–2	Hapoel Lod
Third Round
Ironi Modi'in	3–0	Hapoel Lod
F.C. Dimona	5–1	Beitar Kiryat Gat
Fourth Round
Ironi Modi'in	1–2	F.C. Dimona

F.C. Dimona won the district cup and qualified along with Ironi Modi'in to the sixth round.

==== Liga Gimel ====
===== Liga Gimel Upper Galilee =====
Home team	Score	Away team
First Round
Second Round
Maccabi Ahva Shaab	w/o	Ahi Bir al-Maksur
Hapoel Tuba-Zangariyye	1–2	Hapoel Merom HaGalil
Hapoel Bnei Kisra-Sumei	w/o	F.C. Aramshe Danun
Third Round
Ahi Bir al-Maksur	w/o	F.C. Aramshe Danun
Hapoel Merom HaGalil	4–2	Hapoel Deir al-Asad
Fourth Round
F.C. Aramshe Danun	2–0	Hapoel Merom HaGalil

F.C. Aramshe Danun won the district cup and qualified to the sixth round.

===== Liga Gimel Lower Galilee =====
Home team	Score	Away team
First Round
Second Round
Ahli Tamra	w/o	Maccabi Basmat Tab'un
FC Tzeirei Ilut	0–1	Hapoel Halisa
Maccabi Kiryat Yam	w/o	F.C. Bir al-Maksur
Beitar Kafr Kanna	0–1	Ironi Bnei Sha'ab
Third Round
Maccabi Kiryat Yam	3–1	Hapoel Halisa
Maccabi Basmat Tab'un	3–1	Ironi Bnei Sha'ab
Fourth Round
Maccabi Kiryat Yam	1 – 3 (a.e.t.)	Maccabi Basmat Tab'un

Maccabi Basmat Tab'un won the district cup and qualified to the sixth round.

===== Liga Gimel Jezreel =====
Home team	Score	Away team
First Round
Second Round
Maccabi Umm al-Fahm	7–2	Tzeirei Iksal
Beitar Ein Mahil	w/o	F.C. Kfar Kama
F.C. Pardes Hanna Lior Bokar	w/o	Maccabi Ahi Ar'ara 'Ara
Third Round
F.C. Kfar Kama	3–0	Beitar Umm al-Fahm
Maccabi Umm al-Fahm	0–2	F.C. Pardes Hanna Lior Bokar
Fourth Round
F.C. Pardes Hanna Lior Bokar	5–1	F.C. Kfar Kama

F.C. Pardes Hanna Lior Bokar won the district cup and qualified to the sixth round.

===== Liga Gimel Shomron =====
Home team	Score	Away team
First Round
Second Round
Third Round
Hapoel Bnei Jisr az-Zarqa	1–6	Maccabi Neve Sha'anan Eldad
Beitar Haifa	4–1	Beitar Kiryat Ata Kfir
Fourth Round
Beitar Haifa	0–3	Maccabi Neve Sha'anan Eldad

Maccabi Neve Sha'anan Eldad won the district cup and qualified to the sixth round.

===== Liga Gimel Sharon =====
Home team	Score	Away team
First Round
Maccabi HaSharon Netanya	1–0	Hapoel Oranit
Hapoel Pardesiya	1–1 (a.e.t.) (3–5 p)	F.C. Tzeirei Tira
Maccabi Ironi Kfar Yona	6–1	Otzma Sporting Netanya
Second Round
F.C. Ironi Ariel	1–3	Club Sporting Tel Aviv
F.C. Netanya Kolat Cohen	1–3	F.C. Bnei Ra'anana
Maccabi HaSharon Netanya	1–0	F.C. Tzeirei Tira
Ironi Kfar Yona	1–1 (a.e.t.) (4–3 p)	Hapoel Qalansawe
Third Round
F.C. Bnei Ra'anana	2–4	Maccabi HaSharon Netanya
Club Sporting Tel Aviv	7–2	Ironi Kfar Yona
Fourth Round
Maccabi HaSharon Netanya	0–8	Club Sporting Tel Aviv

Club Sporting Tel Aviv won the district cup and qualified to the sixth round.

===== Liga Gimel Tel Aviv =====
Home team	Score	Away team
First Round
Bnei Yehud	8–0	Beitar Jaffa Zion
Shikun Vatikim Ramat Gan	2–0	F.C. Inter Aly'aa Tel Aviv
Hapoel Tzafririm Holon	3–0	Elitzur Yehud Yotel
Beitar Ezra	0–3	Maccabi HaShikma Ramat Hen
Second Round
Maccabi HaShikma Ramat Hen	5–1	Elitzur Jaffa Tel Aviv
Maccabi Ironi Or Yehuda	2–4	Hapoel Ramat Yisrael
F.C. Otzma Holon	0–3	Bnei Yehud
Shikun Vatikim Ramat Gan	3–5	Hapoel Tzafririm Holon
Third Round
Maccabi HaShikma Ramat Hen	6–2 (a.e.t.)	Hapoel Tzafririm Holon
Hapoel Ramat Yisrael	0–0 (a.e.t.) (6–5 p)	Bnei Yehud
Fourth Round
Maccabi HaShikma Ramat Hen	2–0	Hapoel Ramat Yisrael

Maccabi HaShikma Ramat Hen won the district cup and qualified to the sixth round.

===== Liga Gimel Center =====
Home team	Score	Away team
First Round
F.C. Ashdod City	2–3	Maccabi Kiryat Ekron
Beitar Yavne	4–1	Maccabi Bat Yam
F.C. Rishon LeZion	1–5	Hapoel Gedera
Second Round
Hapoel Ramla	1–4	Hapeol Mevaseret Zion
Hapoel Tirat Shalom	2–2 (a.e.t.) (6–7 p)	Beitar Ashdod
Hapoel Ashdod	1–3	Beitar Yavne
Hapoel Gedera	3–1	Maccabi Kiryat Ekron
Third Round
Beitar Yavne	3–3 (a.e.t.) (3–4 p)	Hapoel Gedera
Hapeol Mevaseret Zion	1–3	Beitar Ashdod
Fourth Round
Beitar Ashdod	2–5	Hapoel Gedera

Hapoel Gedera won the district cup and qualified to the sixth round.

===== Liga Gimel South =====
Home team	Score	Away team
First Round
Second Round
Maccabi Be'er Sheva	1–2	Hapoel Merhavim
F.C. Arad	4–1	F.C. Be'er Sheva Haim Levy
F.C. Tzeirei Rahat	0–0 (a.e.t.) (2–4 p)	Hapoel Sderot
Maccabi Ashkelon	2–1	Maccabi Ironi Hura
Third Round
Hapoel Merhavim	2–0	Maccabi Ashkelon
Hapoel Sderot	4–3	F.C. Arad
Fourth Round
Hapoel Merhavim	0–1	Hapoel Sderot

Hapoel Sderot won the district cup and qualified to the sixth round.

== Fifth Round ==
The fifth Round is played within each division of Liga Alef. The winners qualify to the sixth Round

Home team	Score	Away team
Liga Alef North
Hapoel Kafr Kanna	4–2	Hapoel Umm al-Fahm
Hapoel Bnei Zalafa	1–2	Hapoel Herzliya
F.C. Tira	2–0	Hapoel Jerusalem
Ironi Tiberias	1–2	Hapoel Migdal HaEmek
Ironi Nesher	3–2	Hapoel Shefa-'Amr
Hapoel Asi Gilboa	0–1	F.C. Haifa Robi Shapira
Hapoel Ironi Baqa al-Gharbiyye	3–4	Maccabi Tzur Shalom
Maccabi Ironi Kiryat Ata	0 – 2 (a.e.t.)	Hapoel Kaukab
Liga Alef South
Maccabi Herzliya	2–1	Hapoel Kfar Shalem
Beitar Kfar Saba	0 – 1 (a.e.t.)	F.C. Holon Yermiyahu
Maccabi Kabilio Jaffa	1 – 2 (a.e.t.)	Hakoah Amidar Ramat Gan
Shimshon Kafr Qasim	0–0 (a.e.t.) (3–4 p)	Hapoel Mahane Yehuda
Hapoel Bik'at HaYarden	1–2	A.S. Nordia Jerusalem
Hapoel Azor	0–1	F.C. Kafr Qasim
Maccabi Kiryat Gat	2–1	Maccabi Sha'arayim
Maccabi Yavne	1–0	Agudat Sport Ashdod

== Sixth Round ==
2 October 2018	Maccabi HaShikma Ramat Hen (5)	0–5	F.C. Kafr Qasim (3)	Ramat Gan
13:30				Stadium: HaShikma Ground

2 October 2018	Maccabi Sektzia Ma'alot-Tarshiha (4)	0–2	F.C. Haifa Robi Shapira (3)	Ma'alot-Tarshiha
14:30				Stadium: Municipal Stadium

2 October 2018	Maccabi Herzliya (3)	0–1	Hapoel Gedera (5)	Herzliya
15:00				Stadium: Herzliya Municipal Stadium

2 October 2018	Maccabi Kiryat Gat (3)	1–0	Hapoel Mahane Yehuda (3)	Kiryat Gat
15:00				Stadium: Municipal Stadium

2 October 2018	F.C. Tira (3)	2–4	Hapoel Kaukab (3)	Tira
15:30				Stadium: Municipal Stadium

2 October 2018	F.C. Aramshe Danun (5)	1–3	Maccabi Tzur Shalom (3)	Sha'ab
15:30				Stadium: Municipal Stadium

2 October 2018	Hapoel Sderot (5)	0–4	Maccabi Yavne (3)	Sderot
15:30				Stadium: Municipal Stadium

2 October 2018	F.C. Dimona (4)	1–3 (a.e.t.)	Hakoah Amidar Ramat Gan (3)	Dimona
15:30				Stadium: Municipal Stadium

2 October 2018	F.C. Holon Yermiyahu (3)	0–0 (a.e.t.) (3–5 p)	Shimshon Tel Aviv (4)	Holon
15:30				Stadium: Municipal Stadium

2 October 2018	Ironi Nesher (3)	6–4	Beitar Nahariya (4)	Nesher
16:00				Stadium: Nesher Stadium

2 October 2018	Hapoel Herzliya (3)	7–1	F.C. Pardes Hanna Lior Bokar (5)	Herzliya
19:00				Stadium: Herzliya Municipal Stadium

2 October 2018	A.S. Nordia Jerusalem (3)	2–1	Ironi Modi'in (4)	Jerusalem
19:30				Stadium: Emeq HaArazim

2 October 2018	Club Sporting Tel Aviv (5)	2–4	Hapoel Hod HaSharon (4)	Petah Tikva
21:00				Stadium: Petah Tikva Artificial

9 October 2018	Maccabi Neve Sha'anan Eldad (5)	0–4	F.C. Daburiyya (4)	Haifa
14:00

10 October 2018	Hapoel Kafr Kanna (3)	3–3 (a.e.t.) (0–2 p)	Maccabi Bnei Raina (4)	Kafr Kanna
15:30				Stadium: Azmi Nassar Stadium

16 October 2018	Hapoel Migdal HaEmek (3)	1–0	Maccabi Basmat Tab'un (5)	Migdal HaEmek
15:00				Stadium: Municipal Stadium

== Seventh Round ==
Hapoel Bnei Lod, Beitar Tel Aviv Ramla, Hapoel Marmorek and Hapoel Acre were pre-qualified for the Next Round.

29 October 2018	Maccabi Bnei Raina (4)	0–2	Hapoel Kfar Saba (2)	Kafr Kanna
13:00				Stadium: Azmi Nassar Stadium

29 October 2018	Hapoel Katamon Jerusalem (2)	2–1	Maccabi Yavne (3)	Jerusalem
19:00	Hadar 4'; Dahan 82'		Gabra 13'	Stadium: Teddy Stadium

29 October 2018	Hapoel Iksal (2)	2–0	Shimshon Tel Aviv (4)	Ilut
19:00	Badarneh 37', 60'			Stadium: Ilut Stadium

30 October 2018	Hapoel Kaukab (3)	1–4	Maccabi Ahi Nazareth (2)	Kaukab Abu al-Hija
13:00				Stadium: Municipal Stadium

30 October 2018	Maccabi Kiryat Gat (3)	2–5 (a.e.t.)	A.S. Nordia Jerusalem (3)	Kiryat Gat
13:00				Stadium: Municipal Stadium

30 October 2018	Hapoel Hod HaSharon (4)	2–4	F.C. Daburiyya (4)	Hod HaSharon
13:00				Stadium: Municipal Stadium

30 October 2018	Hapoel Migdal HaEmek (3)	4–0	Hapoel Gedera (5)	Migdal HaEmek
13:00				Stadium: Municipal Stadium

30 October 2018	Hakoah Amidar Ramat Gan (3)	3–0	Hapoel Herzliya (3)	Ramat Gan
20:00				Stadium: Winter Stadium

30 October 2018	Sektzia Nes Tziona (2)	2–0	F.C. Robi Shapira (3)	Nes Tziona
20:00				Stadium: Municipal Stadium

30 October 2018	Hapoel Nazareth Illit (2)	3–1	Ironi Nesher (3)	Nazareth Illit
20:00				Stadium: Green Stadium

30 October 2018	Hapoel Nir Ramat HaSharon (2)	3–1	Maccabi Tzur Shalom (3)	Ramat HaSharon
20:00				Stadium: Grundman Stadium

30 October 2018	Hapoel Rishon LeZion (2)	1–4	Hapoel Afula (2)	Rishon LeZion
20:00				Stadium: Haberfeld Stadium

31 October 2018	Hapoel Petah Tikva (2)	0–1	F.C. Kafr Qasim (3)	Petah Tikva
19:00				Stadium: HaMoshava Stadium

31 October 2018	Hapoel Ramat Gan Givatayim (2)	2–1	Hapoel Ashkelon (2)	Ramat Gan
21:00				Stadium: Ramat Gan Stadium

== Eighth Round ==
20 December 2018	A.S. Nordia Jerusalem (3)	1–3	Bnei Yehuda Tel Aviv (1)	Jerusalem
19:15	Avi Yosef 16' (pen.)		Dor Jan 66', 70'; Dolev Haziza 85'	Stadium: Teddy Stadium

20 December 2018	Hapoel Ironi Kiryat Shmona (1)	1–0	Hapoel Migdal HaEmek (3)	Kiryat Shmona
19:15	Eden Shamir 66'			Stadium: Kiryat Shmona Municipal Stadium

20 December 2018	Hapoel Afula (2)	4–2	Hapoel Bnei Lod (2)	Afula
19:15	Dor Kochav 15'; Gizzie Dorbor 19'; Idan David 54', 57'		Murad Abu Anza 6' (pen.), 60'	Stadium: Afula Illit Stadium

20 December 2018	Maccabi Netanya (1)	5–1	F.C. Daburiyya (4)	Netanya
19:15	Aviv Avraham 9'; Fatos Bećiraj 52'; Guy Melamed 66', 79'; Ali Mohamed 90'		Weaam Amasha 48'	Stadium: Netanya Stadium

20 December 2018	F.C. Ashdod (1)	2–0	Hapoel Ramat Gan Givatayim (2)	Ashdod
19:15	Romain Habran 55'; Dan Bitton 90+3'			Stadium: Yud-Alef Stadium

20 December 2018	Hapoel Haifa (1)	0–1	Hapoel Acre (2)	Haifa
21:00			Amir Khalaila 55'	Stadium: Sammy Ofer Stadium

21 December 2018	Hapoel Nazareth Illit (2)	3–0	Hapoel Iksal (2)	Nazareth Illit
14:00	Ohad Rabinovich 5'; Vyacheslav Orchov 48'; Ahmed Kasoum 78'			Stadium: Green Stadium

21 December 2018	Hapoel Hadera (1)	1–0	Sektzia Nes Tziona (2)	Netanya
14:00	Yonatan Levi 19'			Stadium: Netanya Stadium

21 December 2018	Maccabi Petah Tikva (1)	1–0	Hapoel Kfar Saba (2)	Petah Tikva
14:00	Habib Habibou 29'			Stadium: HaMoshava Stadium

21 December 2018	Hapoel Nir Ramat HaSharon (2)	0–1	F.C. Kafr Qasim (3)	Ramat HaSharon
14:00			Ayub Abu Sabit 74'	Stadium: Grundman Stadium

21 December 2018	Bnei Sakhnin (1)	1–0	Maccabi Ahi Nazareth (2)	Sakhnin
14:00	Ataa Jaber 30'			Stadium: Doha Stadium

21 December 2018	Hapoel Ra'anana (1)	0–0 (a.e.t.) (4–5 p)	Hakoah Amidar Ramat Gan (3)	Ramat Gan
14:00				Stadium: Ramat Gan Stadium

22 December 2018	Maccabi Haifa (1)	5–0	Hapoel Marmorek (2)	Haifa
17:30	Sintayehu Sallalich 4'; Shon Weissman 25'; Mohammed Awaed 33'; Shlomi Yosef Azulay 38', 50'			Stadium: Sammy Ofer Stadium

22 December 2018	Hapoel Be'er Sheva (1)	1–0 (a.e.t.)	Beitar Tel Aviv Ramla (2)	Be'er Sheva
19:30				Stadium: Turner Stadium

22 December 2018	Beitar Jerusalem (1)	1–2	Maccabi Tel Aviv (1)	Jerusalem
21:00				Stadium: Teddy Stadium

23 December 2018	Hapoel Katamon Jerusalem (2)	1–2	Hapoel Tel Aviv (1)	Jerusalem
20:30				Stadium: Teddy Stadium

== Round of 16 ==
15 January 2019	Hapoel Afula (2)	3–1	F.C. Ashdod (1)	Afula
19:30				Stadium: Afula Illit Stadium

15 January 2019	Maccabi Petah Tikva (1)	4–1	Hakoah Amidar Ramat Gan (3)	Petah Tikva
19:35				Stadium: HaMoshava Stadium

15 January 2019	Maccabi Netanya (1)	0–0 (a.e.t.) (4–2 p)	Hapoel Be'er Sheva (1)	Netanya
20:45				Stadium: Netanya Stadium

16 January 2019	Bnei Yehuda Tel Aviv (1)	2–0	Hapoel Nazareth Illit (2)	Petah Tikva
19:30				Stadium: HaMoshava Stadium

17 January 2019	F.C. Kafr Qasim (3)	1–0	Hapoel Ironi Kiryat Shmona (1)	Kafr Qasim
13:00				Stadium: Municipal Stadium

17 January 2019	Maccabi Tel Aviv (1)	4–0	Hapoel Acre (2)	Netanya
19:00				Stadium: Netanya Stadium

17 January 2019	Hapoel Tel Aviv (1)	1–2	Hapoel Hadera (1)	Petah Tikva
20:30				Stadium: HaMoshava Stadium

22 January 2019	Bnei Sakhnin (1)	1–0	Maccabi Haifa (1)	Sakhnin
20:30				Stadium: Doha Stadium

== Quarter-finals ==
=== First leg ===
5 February 2019	Hapoel Afula (2)	0–2	Bnei Yehuda Tel Aviv (1)	Afula
19:00		Report	Shay Konstantini 59'; Dor Jan 86'	Stadium: Afula Illit Stadium

5 February 2019	Maccabi Netanya (1)	1–0	Maccabi Petah Tikva (1)	Netanya
21:00	Fatos Bećiraj 47'	Report		Stadium: Netanya Stadium

6 February 2019	F.C. Kafr Qasim (3)	2–3	Hapoel Hadera (1)	Kafr Qasim
13:00	Alon Sultan 25'; Ohad Edelstein 53'	Report	Eylon Almog 5', 12'; Eliel Peretz 34'	Stadium: Municipal Stadium

6 February 2019	Bnei Sakhnin (1)	1–4	Maccabi Tel Aviv (1)	Acre
21:00	Shuaibu Ibrahim 75'	Report	Chikeluba Ofoedu 12'; Yonatan Cohen 29', 41'; Dor Micha 62'	Stadium: Acre Municipal Stadium

=== Second leg ===
26 February 2019	Bnei Yehuda Tel Aviv (1)	1–1	Hapoel Afula (2)	Petah Tikva
17:00	Jakub Sylvestr 55'	Report	Jurica Grgec 31'	Stadium: HaMoshava Stadium

27 February 2019	Hapoel Hadera (1)	1–0	F.C. Kafr Qasim (3)	Netanya
17:00	Lúcio Maranhão 53'	Report		Stadium: Netanya Stadium

26 February 2019	Maccabi Tel Aviv (1)	0–0	Bnei Sakhnin (1)	Netanya
18:45		Report		Stadium: Netanya Stadium

27 February 2019	Maccabi Petah Tikva (1)	1–1	Maccabi Netanya (1)	Petah Tikva
18:45	Tomáš Sivok 92'	Report	Fatos Bećiraj 88'	Stadium: HaMoshava Stadium

== Semi-finals ==
2 April 2019	Maccabi Netanya (1)	1–0	Hapoel Hadera (1)	Netanya
20:45				Stadium: Netanya Stadium

3 April 2019	Maccabi Tel Aviv (1)	0–1	Bnei Yehuda (1)	Jerusalem
20:45				Stadium: Teddy Stadium

== Final ==
15 May 2019
20:55

Maccabi Netanya	1–1 (a.e.t.)	Bnei Yehuda
Melamed 4'		Jan 82'
Penalties
Finish (penalty scored); Barshazki (penalty scored); Heubach (penalty scored); Nico Olsak (penalty scored); Kanichowsky (penalty missed)	4–5	Jan (penalty scored); Haziza (penalty scored); Sagas (penalty scored); Zenati (penalty scored); Ashkenazi (penalty scored)

Sammy Ofer Stadium, Haifa
Referee: Eitan Shmuelevitz

== See also ==
2018-2019 Israeli Women's Cup
