= Tal Kachila =

Israeli footballer

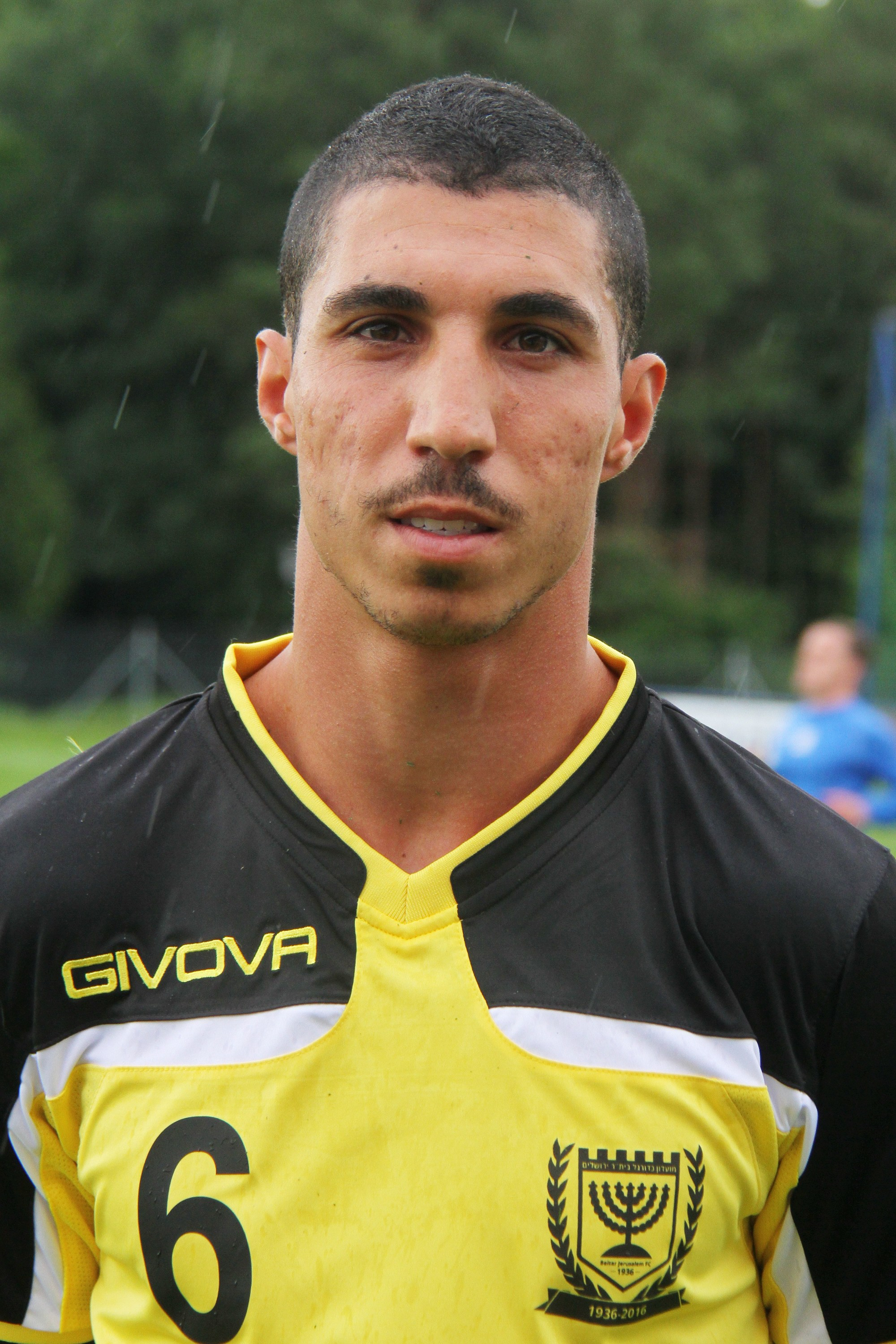
- Kachila playing for Beitar Jerusalem in 2016

Personal information
- Full name: Tal Kachila
- Date of birth: 26 June 1992 (age 34)
- Place of birth: Jerusalem, Israel
- Height: 1.83 m (6 ft 0 in)
- Position: Centre-back

Team information
- Current team: Hapoel Umm al-Fahm

Youth career
- 2006–2012: Beitar Jerusalem

Senior career*
Years	Team	Apps	(Gls)
2012–2019	Beitar Jerusalem	110	(7)
2017	→ Bnei Yehuda (loan)	11	(0)
2019–2020	Atromitos	4	(0)
2020–2021	Hapoel Hadera	15	(1)
2021–2023	Sektzia Ness Ziona	31	(2)
2023–2024	Hapoel Afula	12	(0)
2024	Hapoel Umm al-Fahm	18	(0)
2024–	F.C. Dimona	0	(0)

International career
2010–2011	Israel U19	6	(0)
2011–2015	Israel U21	2	(0)
- * Club domestic league appearances and goals as of 1 June 2024

Tal Kachila (Hebrew: טל כחילה; born June 26, 1992) is an Israeli professional footballer who plays as a centre-back.

== Club career ==
Kachila played from the age of 14 with Beitar Jerusalem's youth team, deciding to become a centre-back, like his father, after combining volleyball and football.

Kachila made his debut for Beitar Jerusalem on 11 August 2012, in a match in the Toto Cup against F.C. Ashdod, coming on as a substitute in the 89th minute.

5 months later, Kachila made his debut in the State Cup, coming on as a substitute in the 67th minute in a 5–0 victory over Maccabi Umm al-Fahm.

On 17 February 2013, Kachila made his league debut, playing in a 3–0 loss to Hapoel Haifa.

On 2 February 2017 loaned to Bnei Yehuda.

On 2 July 2019 signed with Atromitos F.C from the Super League Greece

== International career ==
In October 2010, Kachila made his international debut, playing with the Israeli under-19 national team, in a 3–0 victory against the Armenian under-19 national team in the UEFA U19 Championship.

On 18 November 2013, Kachila made his debut for the Israeli under-21 national team, playing a 4–3 loss against the Portuguese under-21 national team during the UEFA U21 Championship 2015 qualifying round.

== Personal life ==
Kachila is the son of Ehud Kachila, who played 13 years for Beitar Jerusalem as a centre-back.

== Honours ==
=== Club ===
Bnei Yehuda

- Israel State Cup (1): 2016–17
