= Itzik Azuz =

Israeli football Right Back

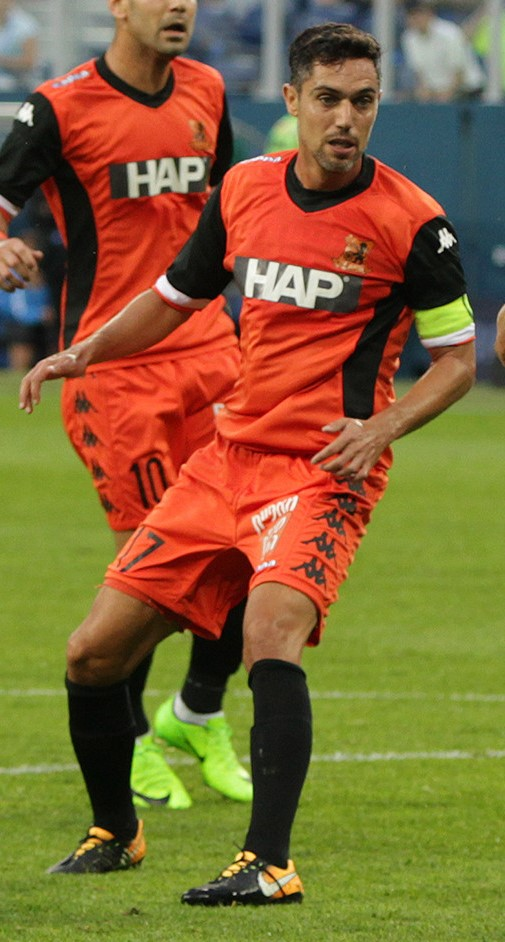
- With Bnei Yehuda in 2017

Personal information
- Full name: Itzik Azuz
- Date of birth: 30 November 1985 (age 40)
- Place of birth: Tel Aviv, Israel
- Height: 1.82 m (5 ft 11 1/2 in)
- Position: Right back

Youth career
- Bnei Yehuda Tel Aviv

Senior career*
Years	Team	Apps	(Gls)
2003–2020	Bnei Yehuda Tel Aviv	356	(1)

International career
	Israel U-19	6	(0)
- * Club domestic league appearances and goals as of 28 May 2020

Itzhak "Itzik" Azuz (Hebrew: יצחק "איציק" עזוז; born 30 November 1985) is an Israeli former football right back who played in Bnei Yehuda Tel Aviv for 18 years.

== Honours ==
=== Club ===
Bnei Yehuda

- Israel State Cup (2): 2016–17, 2018–19

== Career statistics ==
Europa League : 14 Apps
