= Dor Jan =

Israelifootballer

Personal information
- Full name: Dor Jan
- Date of birth: 16 December 1994 (age 31)
- Place of birth: Rishon LeZion, Israel
- Height: 1.81 m (5 ft 11 1/2 in)
- Position: Forward

Team information
- Current team: Hapoel Rishon LeZion
- Number: 9

Senior career*
Years	Team	Apps	(Gls)
2012–2018	Maccabi Tel Aviv	10	(1)
2014–2015	→ Ironi Kiryat Shmona (loan)	11	(0)
2015	→ Hapoel Petah Tikva (loan)	3	(1)
2015–2016	→ Hapoel Acre (loan)	9	(0)
2016–2018	→ Beitar Tel Aviv Ramla (loan)	64	(29)
2018	→ F.C. Ashdod (loan)	15	(1)
2018–2020	Bnei Yehuda	66	(19)
2020–2022	Paços de Ferreira	11	(1)
2021–2022	→ Maccabi Petah Tikva (loan)	0	(0)
2022–2023	F.C. Ashdod	5	(0)
2023	Hapoel Jerusalem	6	(0)
2023–2024	Hapoel Hadera	3	(0)
2024	Maccabi Herzliya	20	(7)
2024–	Hapoel Rishon LeZion	66	(21)

International career
2012	Israel U18	2	(0)
- * Club domestic league appearances and goals as of 24 June 2026

Dor Jan (Hebrew: דור ג'אן; born 16 December 1994) is an Israeli professional footballer who plays as a forward for Hapoel Rishon LeZion.

== Early life ==
Jan was born in Rishon LeZion, Israel, to a Jewish family.

He also holds a Portuguese passport, on account of his Sephardi Jewish ancestry, which eases the move to certain European football leagues.

== Playing career ==
Jan made his professional debut with Maccabi Tel Aviv in a 4-3 Israeli Premier League loss to Bnei Yehuda on 9 May 2012. After a series of loan, Jan signed with Bnei Yehuda on 29 July 2018. On 5 October 2020, Jan signed with Paços de Ferreira in the Portuguese Primeira Liga.

== Honours ==
Maccabi Tel Aviv

- Israeli Premier League: 2012–13, 2013–14

Bnei Yehuda

- Israel State Cup: 2018–19
