= Stav Finish =

Israeli footballer

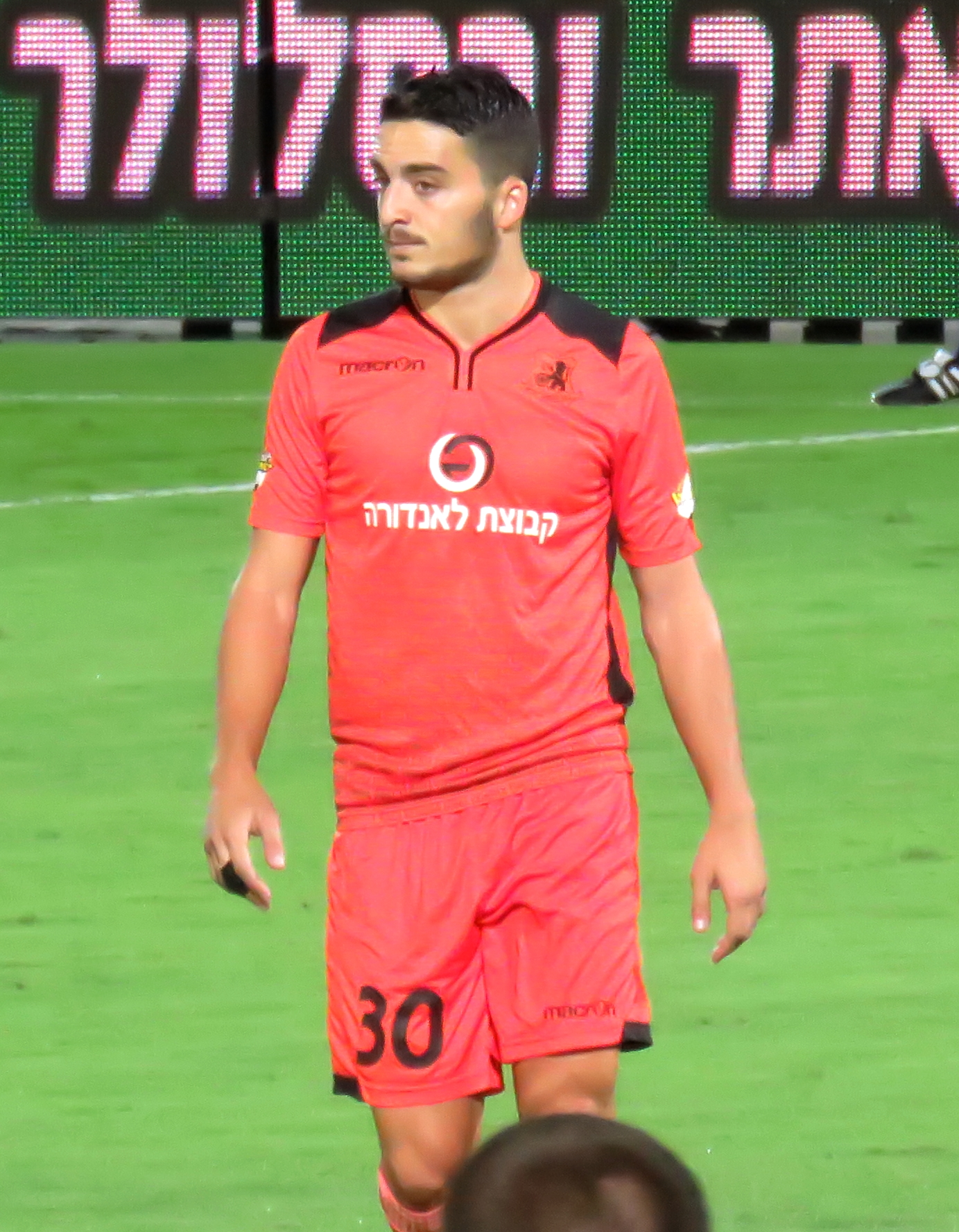

Personal information
- Full name: Stav Finish
- Date of birth: March 26, 1992 (age 34)
- Place of birth: Yavne, Israel
- Height: 1.73 m (5 ft 8 in)
- Position: Midfielder

Team information
- Current team: F.C. Dimona

Youth career
- Maccabi Yavne
- 2007–2012: Bnei Yehuda

Senior career*
Years	Team	Apps	(Gls)
2012–2018	Bnei Yehuda	134	(3)
2018–2020	Maccabi Netanya	43	(1)
2020–2021	Bnei Yehuda	30	(0)
2020–	F.C. Dimona	14	(3)
- * Club domestic league appearances and goals as of 18 March 2022

Stav Finish (Hebrew: סתיו פיניש; born 26 March 1992) is an Israeli footballer who currently plays for F.C. Dimona.

== Honours ==
- Israel State Cup (1):
  - 2017
