= Aviv Avraham =

Israeli footballer (born 1996)

Aviv Daniel Avraham
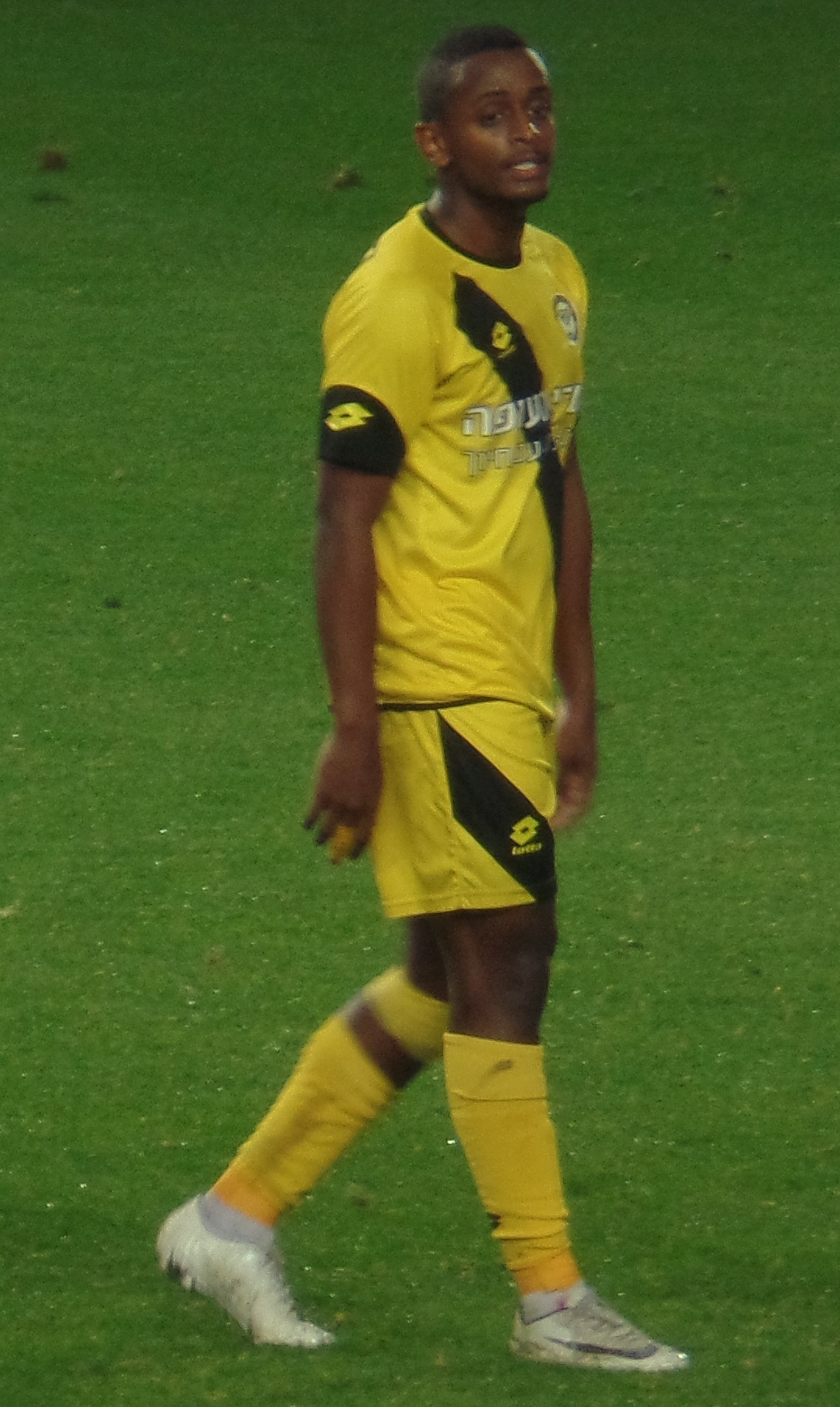
- Avraham playing for Maccabi Netanya in 2018

Personal information
- Full name: Aviv Daniel Avraham
- Date of birth: March 30, 1996 (age 30)
- Place of birth: Afula, Israel
- Position: Midfielder

Team information
- Current team: Hapoel Ironi Kiryat Shmona

Youth career
- 2007–2010: Hapoel Afula
- 2010–2016: Maccabi Netanya

Senior career*
Years	Team	Apps	(Gls)
2014–2024	Maccabi Netanya	240	(18)
2024–2025	AEL Limassol	7	(0)
2025	Levadiakos	8	(0)
2025–	Hapoel Ironi Kiryat Shmona	25	(1)

International career^{‡}
2014	Israel U19	7	(0)
2017	Israel U21	4	(0)
2021-2022	Israel	2	(0)
- * Club domestic league appearances and goals as of 24 June 2026 ‡ National team caps and goals as of 21:56, 15 November 2021 (UTC)

Aviv Daniel Avraham (or Daniel Avraham, Hebrew: אביב דניאל אברהם; born March 30, 1996) is an Israeli professional footballer who plays as a midfielder for Hapoel Ironi Kiryat Shmona.

== Early life ==
Avraham was born in Afula, Israel, to an Ethiopian Jewish family, and he is the youngest brother amongst eight siblings.

== Personal life ==
Avraham has described becoming more religiously observant, praying with a minyan and studying Torah during the week. To avoid travel on Shabbat, he has arranged accommodation near away grounds in advance and walked to matches.""For Shabbat, I'll Do Anything": Israeli Soccer Star Aviv Avraham Opens Up". Hidabroot. 25 August 2026.

== International career ==
He has been a youth international since 2014. Between 2017 and 2018, he was part of Israel under-21s.

He was called up for the senior Israel national team on 14 November 2021, during their 2022 FIFA World Cup qualifiers - UEFA. He debuted for the senior team in a 3–2 home win for Israel against Faroe Islands on 15 November 2021, at the 2022 FIFA World Cup qualifiers - UEFA.

== Honours ==
- Liga Leumit
  - Winner (2): 2013–14, 2016–17
- Toto Cup
  - Winner (1): 2022–23
- State Cup
  - Runner-up (2): 2018–19, 2022–23
