= Shimon Bitton =

Israeli footballer

Shimon Bitton שמעון ביטון
Personal information
- Full name: Shimon Bitton
- Date of birth: 27 June 1967 (age 59)
- Place of birth: Be'er Sheva, Israel
- Height: 1.86 m (6 ft 1 in)
- Position: Left back

Youth career
- 1977–1986: Hapoel Be'er Sheva

Senior career*
Years	Team	Apps	(Gls)
1986–1994	Hapoel Be'er Sheva		
1994–1995	Beitar Jerusalem	28	(1)
1995–1998	Hapoel Be'er Sheva	80	(0)
1998–2000	Beitar Be'er Sheva		

International career
1994	Israel	4	(0)

Managerial career
- 2007–2009: Hapoel Merhavim
- 2009: Hapoel Arad
- 2010: Hapoel Merhavim
- 2010–2014: Hapoel Be'er Sheva (assistant manager)
- 2014–2016: Hapoel Be'er Sheva (U19)
- 2016–2017: Hapoel Tel Aviv (U19)
- 2019–2020: F.C. Dimona
- 2020–2021: Ironi Kuseife
- 2023–2024: F.C. Dimona
- * Club domestic league appearances and goals

Shimon Bitton (Hebrew: שמעון ביטון; born 27 June 1967) is an Israeli former professional footballer that has played in Hapoel Be'er Sheva.

== Honours ==
=== Club ===
Hapoel Beer Sheva

- Premier League:
  - Third place (4): 1982/1983, 1987/1988, 1993/1994, 1996/1997
- State Cup:
  - Winners (1): 1996/1997
  - Runners-up (1): 1983/1984
- Toto Cup:
  - Winners (2): 1988/1989, 1995/1996
  - Runners-up (1): 1985/1986
- Lillian Cup:
  - Winners (1): 1988
  - Runners-up (2): 1982, 1983
