= Nico Olsak =

Argentine footballer

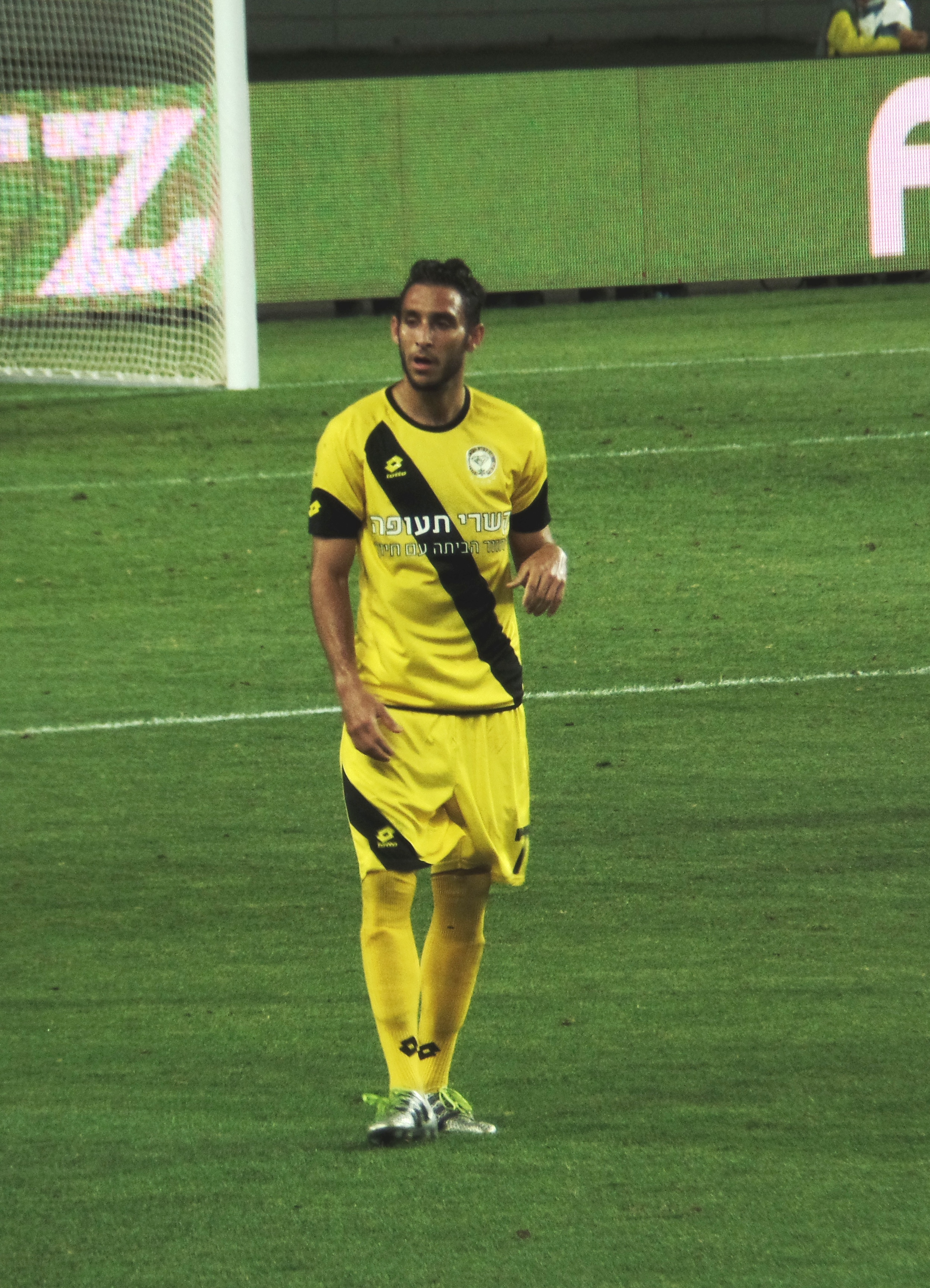

Personal information
- Full name: Nicolás Olsak
- Date of birth: 25 November 1991 (age 34)
- Place of birth: Buenos Aires, Argentina
- Height: 1.87 m (6 ft 1 1/2 in)
- Position: Midfielder

Team information
- Current team: Maccabi Herzliya

College career
Years	Team	Apps	(Gls)
2010–2013	Belmont Bruins	78	(13)

Senior career*
Years	Team	Apps	(Gls)
2014–2015	Maccabi Kabilio Jaffa	30	(1)
2015–2016	Hapoel Ramat HaSharon	32	(0)
2016–2020	Maccabi Netanya	113	(5)
2020–2021	RKC Waalwijk	8	(0)
2021	Beitar Jerusalem	5	(0)
2021–2022	Maccabi Petah Tikva	19	(0)
2022–2023	Hapoel Hadera	4	(0)
2023–	Maccabi Herzliya	6	(0)
- * Club domestic league appearances and goals as of 1 February 2023 (UTC)

Nicolás "Nico" Olsak (Hebrew: ניקו אולסק; born 25 November 1991) is a professional footballer who plays as a midfielder for Maccabi Herzliya.

== Early life ==
Olsak was born into a family of American Jewish descent in Buenos Aires, Argentina. When Olsak was 12 years old, his parents, Marcelo and Gabriella, decided to move the family to Boca Raton, Florida, in the United States.

== College career ==
After high school, Olsak went to Belmont University.

== Club career ==
Olsak arrived in Israel as a tourist on Birthright. After a successful trial, he joined Maccabi Kabilo Jaffa. The following year he moved to Ironi Ramat Hasharon. In his third year in Israel, Olsak signed with Premier League club Maccabi Netanya.

After four seasons, and with his contract expiring, Olsak visited the training grounds of Maccabi Netanya on 29 June 2020 to say goodbye to his former teammates and coaches before returning to the United States as a free agent. Shortly after, he signed with RKC Waalwijk of the Dutch Eredivisie.

On 8 February 2021, Olsak joined Beitar Jerusalem, signing a contract until the end of the 2020–21 season.

== Personal life ==
Olsak holds Argentine, Israeli, Polish, and American citizenships. In 2020, Olsak got engaged to Tali Shimon, an American of Israeli descent from Florida.

== Career statistics ==
=== Club ===
As of match played 10 October 2022

Appearances and goals by club, season and competition
Club	Season	League			National Cup		League Cup		Continental		Other		Total	
Club	Season	Division	Apps	Goals	Apps	Goals	Apps	Goals	Apps	Goals	Apps	Goals	Apps	Goals
Maccabi Kabilio Jaffa	2014–15	Liga Alef	30	1	3	0	0	0	–		0	0	33	1
Hapoel Nir Ramat HaSharon	2015–16	Liga Leumit	32	0	1	0	0	0	–		0	0	33	0
Maccabi Netanya	2016–17	Liga Leumit	29	2	0	0	0	0	0	0	0	0	29	2
Maccabi Netanya	2017–18	Israeli Premier League	35	1	1	0	3	0	0	0	0	0	39	1
Maccabi Netanya	2018–19	Israeli Premier League	29	1	5	0	5	0	0	0	0	0	39	1
Maccabi Netanya	2019–20	Israeli Premier League	20	1	1	1	3	0	0	0	0	0	24	2
Maccabi Netanya	Total		113	5	7	1	11	0	0	0	0	0	131	6
RKC Waalwijk	2020–21	Eredivisie	8	0	0	0	0	0	0	0	0	0	8	0
Beitar Jerusalem	2020–21	Israeli Premier League	5	0	0	0	0	0	0	0	0	0	5	0
Maccabi Petah Tikva	2021–22	Israeli Premier League	19	0	1	0	5	0	0	0	0	0	25	0
Hapoel Hadera	2022–23	Israeli Premier League	4	0	0	0	0	0	0	0	0	0	4	0
Maccabi Herzliya	2022–23	Liga Alef	6	0	0	0	0	0	0	0	0	0	6	0
Career total			216	6	12	1	16	0	0	0	0	0	245	7

== Honours ==
Maccabi Netanya

- Liga Leumit: 2016–17
