= F.C. Dimona =

Israeli football club

- Full name: Moadon Sport Dimona מועדון ספורט דימונה
- Founded: 2004
- Ground: Municipal Stadium, Dimona
- Capacity: 1,140
- Chairman: Roee Amano
- Manager: Sharon Avitan
- League: Liga Alef South
- 2024–25: Liga Alef South, 5th of 16
Home colours	Away colours

F.C. Dimona (Hebrew: מועדון ספורט דימונה), Moadon Sport Dimona, lit. 'Dimona Sport Club' (or in short מ.ס. דימונה Mem Samekh Dimona, lit. 'F.C. Dimona') is an Israeli football club based in Dimona. The club is currently in Liga Alef South.

== History ==
F.C. Dimona was founded in 2004, one season after Hapoel Dimona dissolved, but are still commonly known and referred as Hapoel Dimona. The club reached Liga Bet in the 2005–06 season, where they played in the South B division. Ten years later the club was promoted to Liga Alef after winning the 2015–16 season.

In the 2017–18 season the club was relegated back to Liga Bet. Two seasons later Shimon Bitton was appointed the club's manager and the club was promoted after finishing the season in first place before stopping due to COVID-19.

In summer 2023 Nir Klinger joined as the professional manager and Bitton returned to the head coach position.

== Current squad ==
As of 22 October 2024

No.	Pos.	Nation	Player
3	DF	ISR	Tomer Keren
3	MF	ISR	Roi Maman
4	DF	ISR	Nir Dadia
6	MF	ISR	Benny Natan
7	FW	ISR	Amran El Krenawy
8	MF	ISR	Shay Bouznah
9	FW	ISR	Firas Ganayem
11	FW	ISR	Rom Alyagon
13	MF	ISR	Eric Khalfin
14	MF	ISR	Karem Arshid
15	MF	ISR	Moshe Asulin

No.	Pos.	Nation	Player
16	DF	ISR	Ariel Elmalem
17	DF	ISR	Khaled Zaid
19	DF	ISR	Shalev Saban
21	FW	ISR	Mal Zobino
22	GK	ISR	Ofek Cohen
23	MF	ISR	Tamir Adi
26	DF	ISR	Amit Bitton
30	MF	ISR	Liav Levy
36	GK	ISR	Gal Navon
37	DF	ISR	Noam Gamon
66	DF	ISR	Tal Kachila

== Honours ==
=== League ===
Honour	No.	Years
Fourth tier	1	2015–16
Fourth tier	1	2019–20
