= 1971 Israel Super Cup =

Maccabi Netanya	Hakoah Ramat Gan
4	2
- Date: 18 September 1971
- Venue: HaKufsa, Netanya
- Referee: Moshe Ashkenazi
- Attendance: 10,000

The 1971 Israel Super Cup was the third Israel Super Cup (eighth, including unofficial matches, as the competition wasn't played within the Israel Football Association in its first 5 editions, until 1969), an annual Israel football match played between the winners of the previous season's Top Division and Israel State Cup.

The match was played between Maccabi Netanya, champions of the 1970–71 Liga Leumit and Hakoah Ramat Gan, winners of the 1970–71 Israel State Cup.

At the match, played at Maccabi Netanya Stadium, Maccabi Netanya won 4–2 after extra time.

== Match details ==
18 September 1971

Maccabi Netanya	4–2 (a.e.t.)	Hakoah Ramat Gan
S. Bar 20'; Amira 41'; Sarusi 107', 118'		Rubinstein 45'; Heftel 48' (pen.)

HaKufsa, Netanya
Attendance: 10,000
Referee: Moshe Ashkenazi

Maccabi Netanya	Hakoah Ramat Gan

GK	(Israel) Haim Levin
RB	Israel Hajaj	Substituted off
CB	(Israel) Shraga Topolansky
CB	(Israel) Shraga Bar
LB	(Israel) Ya'akov Shmuel
CM	(Israel) Efraim Amira
CM	(Israel) Albert Gazal
CM	(Israel) Yehoshua Gal
FW	(Israel) Eliezer Shlomovich	Substituted off
FW	(Israel) Mordechai Spiegler
FW	(Israel) Avraham Sabu
Substitutes:
DF	(Israel) Moshe Yosef	Substituted in
FW	(Israel) Victor Sarusi	Substituted in
Manager:
(Israel) Shmulik Perlman

GK	(Israel) Uri Nitzan	Substituted off
RB	(Israel) Danny Heftel
DF	(Israel) Shlomo Chepnik	Substituted off
DF	(Israel) Ephraim Pittel
LB	(Israel) Schnitzer
CM	(Israel) Gideon Sherer	Substituted off
CM	(Israel) Asher Messing
CM	(Israel) Aharon Shuruk
FW	(Israel) Moshe Yechiel
FW	(Israel) Zvi Farkas
FW	(Israel) Ya'akov Rubinstein
Substitutes:
GK	(Israel) Danny Mano	Substituted in
DF	(Israel) Shaul Cohen	Substituted in
MF	(Israel) I. Zvi	Substituted in
Manager:
(Israel) Eliezer Spiegel
