= 1970–71 Israel State Cup =

Tournament details
- Country: Israel

Final positions
- Champions: Hakoah Maccabi Ramat Gan (2nd title)
- Runners-up: Maccabi Haifa

The 1970–71 Israel State Cup (Hebrew: גביע המדינה, Gvia HaMedina) was the 32nd season of Israel's nationwide football cup competition and the 17th after the Israeli Declaration of Independence.

Hakoah Maccabi Ramat Gan and Maccabi Haifa made their way to the final, which was played on 16 June 1971, Hakoah winning 2–1 to obtain its second cup.

== Results ==
=== Second round ===
Home team	Score	Away team
Hapoel Yeruham	3–2	Hapoel Arad
Beitar Bat Yam	3–3 (a.e.t.); 6–5 p.	Hapoel Ginaton
Maccabi Rehovot	2–1	Maccabi Be'er Sheva
Maccabi Ramla	2–2 (a.e.t.); 3–2 p.	Hapoel Bnei Lakhish
Beitar Tel Hanan	w/o	Maccabi Tamra/Shefa-'Amr
Maccabi HaSharon Netanya	4–0	Maccabi Pardes Hanna
Hapoel Kiryat Haim	9–2	Beitar Afula
Hapoel Yokneam	w/o	Hapoel Kiryat Binyamin
M.S. Even Yehuda	4–3	Bnei Nein
Beitar Kiryat Shmona	w/o	Hapoel Beit Eliezer
Hapoel Umm al-Fahm	w/o	Beitar Migdal HaEmek
Maccabi Zikhron Ya'akov	8–0	Maccabi Bnei Reineh
Hapoel Karmiel	2–1	Ahi Bnei Nazareth
Beitar Tiberias	5–3	Hapoel Givat Haim/Beit Itzhak
Beitar Kiryat Tiv'on	3–2 (a.e.t.)	Hapoel Hulata
Beitar Nahariya	2–1	Hapoel Caesarea
Hapoel Geva	w/o	Hapoel Ra'anana
Hapoel Dan	w/o	Beitar Tirat HaCarmel
Maccabi Kiryat Gat/Kfar Gavirol	w/o	Hapoel Qalansawe
Beitar Ashkelon	3–0	Hapoel Afeka
Beitar Katamonim	2–0	Tzeirei Jaffa
Hapoel Kafr Qasim	4–0	Hapoel Azor
Maccabi Yavne	3–0	Maccabi Yehud
HaBira Jerusalem	6–1	Hapoel Yatzitz
Hapoel Ashdod	3–1	Maccabi Kiryat Malakhi
Hapoel Ramat Eliyahu	1–1 (a.e.t.); 3–2 p.	Antonio Jaffa
Maccabi HaShikma Ramat Gan	5–1	Hapoel Neve Golan
Beitar Be'er Sheva	3–3 (a.e.t.); 3–2 p.	Maccabi Beit Shemesh
Beitar Jaffa	4–2	Hapoel Merhavim
Maccabi Ramat HaSharon	2–0	Hapoel Patish
Hapoel Or Yehuda	7–3	Hapoel Bnei Zion
Hapoel Ramat HaSharon	2–0	Hapoel Givat Shmuel
Hapoel Kiryat Shalom	3–2 (a.e.t.)	Beitar Ezra
Hapoel Gedera	w/o	ASA Jerusalem
Hapoel Kfar Shalem	6–2	Beitar Ashdod
Hapoel Rosh HaAyin	6–0	Maccabi Ramat Hen
Hapoel Zfon Tel Aviv	5–4 (a.e.t.)	Beitar Holon
Maccabi Bat Yam	2–0	Hapoel Ganei Tikva
Beitar Dov Netanya	3–0	Hapoel Sakhnin
Hapoel Tayibe	5–0	Beitar Alona
Hapoel Safed	3–2	Hapoel Kiryat Nazareth
Hapoel Tel Mond	w/o	Maccabi Amidar Netanya
Maccabi Ashkelon	6–0	Bnei Ashdod
Hapoel Kadima	5–3	Maccabi Holon
Hapoel Kiryat Malakhi	5–4 (a.e.t.)	Beitar Ramat Gan
Hapoel Jaljulia	w/o	Hapoel Hod HaSharon
Hapoel Sde Nahum/Beit She'an	5–3	Maccabi Neve Sha'anan
Hapoel Kafr Qara	2–1	Hapoel Kiryat Yam
Hapoel Hatzor	w/o	Hapoel Afula
Hapoel Gvar'am	3–2	Hapoel Sderot
Hapoel Dimona	3–1	Hapoel Ofakim
Hapoel Shikun HaMizrah	3–2	Beitar Gedera
Hapoel Ramla	2–1	Beitar Mahane Yehuda
Maccabi Kiryat Bialik	w/o	Maccabi Fureidis
Beitar Binyamina	3–2	Maccabi Kfar Yona
Beitar Acre	1–0	Hapoel Tel Hanan
Hapoel Afikim	5–2 (a.e.t.)	Hapoel Shefa-'Amr
Hapoel Migdal HaEmek	2–1 (a.e.t.)	Maccabi Tiberias
Hapoel Binyamina	w/o	Hapoel Kafr Sulam
Hapoel Givat Olga	w/o	Hapoel Kfar Kama
Beitar Beit She'an	w/o	Hapoel Kiryat Ata

Also promoted from this round: Maccabi Afula, Hapoel Givat HaMoreh and Hapoel Kafr Yasif

=== Third round ===
Home team	Score	Away team
Hapoel Yeruham	3–1 (a.e.t.)	Beitar Bat Yam
Maccabi Rehovot	5–1	Maccabi Ramla
Beitar Tel Hanan	2–0	Maccabi HaSharon Netanya
Hapoel Yokneam	0–7	Hapoel Kiryat Haim
M.S. Even Yehuda	2–0	Hapoel Kafr Yasif
Beitar Kiryat Shmona	w/o	Hapoel Umm al-Fahm
Maccabi Zikhron Ya'akov	3–2	Hapoel Karmiel
Beitar Tiberias	9–2	Hapoel Givat HaMoreh
Beitar Kiryat Tiv'on	1–1 (a.e.t.); 5–4 p.	Beitar Nahariya
Hapoel Dan	2–3	Hapoel Geva
Maccabi Kiryat Gat/Kfar Gavirol	2–2 (a.e.t.); 3–2 p.	Beitar Ashkelon
Beitar Katamonim	2–1 (a.e.t.)	Hapoel Kafr Qasim
Maccabi Yavne	1–0	HaBira Jerusalem
Hapoel Ramat Eliyahu	1–2	Hapoel Ashdod
Maccabi HaShikma Ramat Gan	1–0	Beitar Be'er Sheva
Maccabi Ramat HaSharon	0–1	Beitar Jaffa
Hapoel Or Yehuda		Hapoel Ramat HaSharon
Hapoel Gedera	0–2	Hapoel Kiryat Shalom
Hapoel Kfar Shalem	3–1 (a.e.t.)	Hapoel Rosh HaAyin
Hapoel Zfon Tel Aviv	2–1	Maccabi Bat Yam
Beitar Dov Netanya	4–1	Hapoel Tayibe
Hapoel Safed	w/o	Hapoel Tel Mond
Maccabi Ashkelon	1–1 (a.e.t.); 4–3 p.	Hapoel Kadima
Hapoel Kiryat Malakhi		Hapoel Jaljulia
Hapoel Kafr Qara	0–2	Hapoel Sde Nahum/Beit She'an
Hapoel Hatzor	6–0	Maccabi Afula
Hapoel Dimona	0–1	Hapoel Gvar'am
Hapoel Shikun HaMizrah	5–2	Hapoel Ramla
Beitar Binyamina	2–2 (a.e.t.); 2–3 p.	Maccabi Kiryat Bialik
Beitar Acre	4–2	Hapoel Afikim
Hapoel Migdal HaEmek	2–0	Hapoel Binyamina
Hapoel Givat Olga	4–1	Beitar Beit She'an

=== Fourth round ===
Liga Alef clubs entered the competition on this round. As in previous seasons, The draw was set so that Liga Alef clubs wouldn't be drawn against each other.

2 January 1971	Hapoel Yeruham	1–6	Maccabi Sha'arayim
	Ifargan 22'		Cohen 31', 33', ?'; Akta 38'; Zandani ?'; Sha'ubi ?'

2 January 1971	Maccabi Rehovot	3–1	Beitar Ramla
	Paz 31', 33', 75'		Arbetsmann 60'	Attendance: 300; Referee: Bareket

2 January 1971	Hapoel Mahane Yehuda	1–2	Beitar Tel Hanan
	Lenner 2'		Ben-Hemo 19'; Hillel 70' (o.g.)

2 January 1971	Hapoel Kiryat Haim	4–1	Hapoel Zikhron Ya'akov
	Ben-Ezra 10', 29' (pen.), 83'; Wolgrin ?'		Cherkovich 4'

2 January 1971	Hapoel Tirat HaCarmel	8–0	M.S. Even Yehuda
	R. Vanunu 32', 46', 49', 53', 63'; Lalkin 59'; C. Vanunu 81', ?'			Referee: Nahmias

2 January 1971	Beitar Kiryat Shmona	1–2	Hapoel Nahariya
	Atias 27'		Levi 2' (o.g.); Edri 50' (o.g.)

2 January 1971	Hapoel Bnei Nazareth	2–1	Maccabi Zikhron Ya'akov
	Ramzi 12'; Adnan 30'		Atzmon 67'

2 January 1971	Beitar Tiberias	2–1	Hapoel Ramat Gan
	Ezri 19'; Nizri 20'		Levi 39'	Attendance: 1000

2 January 1971	Beitar Kiryat Tiv'on	0–1	Hapoel Kiryat Shmona
			Pahima 48'

2 January 1971	Maccabi Herzliya	3–0	Hapoel Geva
	Gilboa 44'; Shtiebelmann 55'; Mizrahi 60'			Attendance: 300; Referee: Loya

2 January 1971	Hapoel Eilat	1–0	Maccabi Kiryat Gat/Kfar Gavirol
	Alon 8'			Referee: Tarabiya

2 January 1971	Maccabi Ramat Amidar	1–0	Beitar Katamonim
	Peltz 16'			Referee: Nehama

2 January 1971	Hapoel Be'er Ya'akov	2–1 (a.e.t.)	Maccabi Yavne
	Wolfer 88'; Sapozhnik 95'		Shiklash 67'	Attendance: 500; Referee: Tudrus

2 January 1971	Hapoel Ashdod	1–0	Hapoel Ashkelon
	Ben-Yishai 60'			Attendance: 7000; Referee: Refael

2 January 1971	Hapoel Be'er Sheva	6–1	Maccabi HaShikma Ramat Gan
	Daniel 13', 34', 75'; Gez 33'; Offer ?' ? ?' (o.g.)		Wortsch 27'	Attendance: 2000; Referee: Levi

2 January 1971	Hapoel Marmorek	1–2	Beitar Jaffa	Hapoel Marmorek ground
	Shadi 9'		Bachar 22'; Elbaz 63'	Attendance: 400; Referee: Harbon

2 January 1971	Hapoel Rishon LeZion	3–0	Hapoel Or Yehuda
	Levin 43', 73', 88'			Referee: Ben Itzhak

2 January 1971	Hapoel Lod	2–0	Hapoel Kiryat Shalom
	Band 18'; Sandler 86'			Referee: Buzaglo

2 January 1971	Hapoel Kfar Shalem	2–0	Hapoel Yehud
	I. Henin 5'; M. Henin 51'			Attendance: 1000; Referee: Shalem

2 January 1971	Hapoel Zfon Tel Aviv	1–2	Hapoel Kiryat Ono
	Hajima 41' (pen.)		Ben-Harush 45'; Khalifa 50'	Attendance: 350; Referee: Ne'eman

2 January 1971	Maccabi Jaffa	6–0	Beitar Dov Netanya
	Elazar 13', 40'; Katzav 15'; Leon 50'; Levi 54', 70'

2 January 1971	Hapoel Safed	0–2	Beitar Netanya
			Saban 63', 88'

2 January 1971	Maccabi Ashkelon	1–3	Beitar Lod
	Tzemah 27'		Yeverbaum 70'; Trabelsi 86'; Livni 88'

2 January 1971	Hapoel Beit Shemesh	2–0	Hapoel Kiryat Malakhi
	Levi 46'; Mamelian 84'			Attendance: 3500; Referee: Ben-Ami

2 January 1971	Hapoel Sde Nahum/Beit She'an	1–5	Hapoel Acre
	Algarissi 80'		Asayag 30', 36', 75', 81'; Ader'ee 88'

2 January 1971	Hapoel Hatzor	w/o	Maccabi Hadera

2 January 1971	Sektzia Nes Tziona	3–0	Hapoel Gvar'am
	Madmoni 21'; Azulai 64'; I. Cohen 68'			Attendance: 800; Referee: Tzefanya

2 January 1971	Hapoel Shikun HaMizrah	2–1	Hapoel Bat Yam
	Buriya 20', 83'		Bejerano 40'	Attendance: 1500; Referee: Gaton

2 January 1971	Hapoel Herzliya	2–1	Maccabi Kiryat Bialik
	Mesika 61' (pen.); Zelikovski 70'		Daniel 55'

2 January 1971	Beitar Acre	0–0 (a.e.t.) (4–0 p)	Hapoel Nahilel

2 January 1971	Hapoel Netanya	2–5 (a.e.t.)	Hapoel Migdal HaEmek
	Arbiv 76'; Ro'ash 100'		Baranes 56', 102', 107'; Shemesh 97'; Sagan 110'

2 January 1971	Hapoel Tiberias	1–3	Hapoel Givat Olga
	Beba 38'		Malka 6'; Itach 75'; Kaplan 82'

=== Fifth round ===
6 February 1971	Maccabi Sha'arayim	2–2 (a.e.t.) (3–2 p)	Maccabi Rehovot
	Perahya 86', 88'		Lavi 5'; Mahlab 71'	Referee: Arye
	Penalties
	Bezek (penalty scored); Sha'ubi (penalty missed); Peled (penalty missed); Perahya (penalty scored); Akta (penalty scored)		(penalty missed) Lavi; (penalty scored) Ginzburski; (penalty missed) Botwein; (penalty scored) Mahlab; (penalty missed) Raziel

6 February 1971	Beitar Tel Hanan	v	Hapoel Kiryat Haim

6 February 1971	Hapoel Tirat HaCarmel	6–1	Hapoel Nahariya F.C.
	Lalkin 5', 65'; Ohayon 18'; Kravetsov 35'; Smucha 40'; Liberti 52'		Partuk 27'	Attendance: 1000; Referee: Ben-Kiki

6 February 1971	Hapoel Bnei Nazareth	6–0	Beitar Tiberias	Nazareth Municipal Stadium
	Kaed 25' (pen.), 71', 85'; Farhoud 64'; Ramzi 69'; Karim 73'			Attendance: 2000; Referee: Ne'eman

6 February 1971	Hapoel Kiryat Shmona	4–1	Maccabi Herzliya
	Karov 10'; Levi 43', 65'; Kaner 75'		Ben-David 85'	Attendance: 1000; Referee: Ben-Ezra

6 February 1971	Hapoel Eilat	0–1	Maccabi Ramat Amidar
			Konstantinovsky 23'	Attendance: 1000; Referee: Niv

6 February 1971	Hapoel Ashdod	0–5	Hapoel Be'er Ya'akov
			Z. Wolfer 9'; R. Wolfer 27', 67'; Betzalel 43', 51'	Attendance: 1000; Referee: Tzefanya

6 February 1971	Hapoel Be'er Sheva	5–0	Beitar Jaffa	Vasermil Stadium
	Barad 25', 31', 67'; Offer 58'; Admon 83'			Attendance: 1500; Referee: Meidenbaum

6 February 1971	Hapoel Rishon LeZion	2–1	Hapoel Lod
	Mizrahi 46', 65'		Sandler 27'	Attendance: 700; Referee: Aziz

6 February 1971	Hapoel Kfar Shalem	w/o (Note: The match was abandoned at half time with Hapoel Kiryat Ono leading 2–0, since the referee stated that stones were thrown at him from the host's crowd as he walked to the dressing room.)	Hapoel Kiryat Ono
			Ben Harush 22', 32'	Referee: Levi

6 February 1971	Maccabi Jaffa	3–1	Beitar Netanya
	Portugez 58'; Shakruka 73'; Elazar 80'		Zohar 85' (pen.)	Attendance: 2000; Referee: Straschnov

6 February 1971	Beitar Lod	4–5 (a.e.t.)	Hapoel Beit Shemesh
	Avita 43', 62'; Biber 55', 60'		Solomon 14'; Mamelian 35', 51', 80'; Ezra 109'	Attendance: 800; Referee: Halabi

6 February 1971	Hapoel Acre	2–0	Hapoel Hatzor	Hapoel Acre ground
	Tahor 18'; Edri 59' (pen.)			Attendance: 1000; Referee: Tamir

6 February 1971	Sektzia Nes Tziona	4–1	Hapoel Shikun HaMizrah
	Zweig 7', 85'; Madmoni 60'; Breslavski 88'		Dadush 14'	Attendance: 500; Referee: Uziel

6 February 1971	Hapoel Herzliya	1–0	Beitar Acre
	Sakal 56'			Attendance: 1000; Referee: Ashkar

6 February 1971	Hapoel Migdal HaEmek	4–4 (a.e.t.) (1–2 p)	Hapoel Givat Olga
	Segal 32', 100'; Ben-Amram 55'; Avishemesh 80'		Nadler 22'; Itach 60'; Haviv 82'; Kahlon 105'	Referee: Elfasi

=== Sixth Round ===
Liga Leumit clubs entered the competition in this round. The IFA arranged the draw so each Liga Leumit clubs wouldn't be drawn to play each other.

10 April 1971	Hapoel Tel Aviv	6–1	Maccabi Sha'arayim	Bloomfield Stadium
	Feigenbaum 2', 50', 86'; Rachminovich 32' (pen.); Hazum 65'; Ben Baruch 81'		Sha'ubi 51' (pen.)	Attendance: 8000; Referee: A. Cohen

10 April 1971	Hapoel Kfar Saba	2–0	Hapoel Kiryat Haim	Hapoel Kfar Saba ground
	Fogel 62'; Katz 83'			Attendance: 1000; Referee: I. Cohen

10 April 1971	Maccabi Petah Tikva	1–0	Hapoel Tirat HaCarmel
	Makmel 11'			Attendance: 2000; Referee: Ne'eman

10 April 1971	Beitar Jerusalem	2–0	Hapoel Bnei Nazareth	YMCA Stadium
	Azulai 10', 35'			Attendance: 2500; Referee: Klein

10 April 1971	Hapoel Haifa	2–0	Hapoel Kiryat Shmona	Kiryat Haim Stadium
	Piker 27'; Shapira 40'			Attendance: 2500; Referee: Ben-Kiki

10 April 1971	Maccabi Ramat Amidar	0–1	Hapoel Hadera
			Skloot 78'	Attendance: 3000; Referee: Mizrahi

10 April 1971	Hapoel Be'er Ya'akov	0–2	Maccabi Haifa	Be'er Ya'akov
			Hirsch 20'; Gershgoren 85'	Attendance: 3500; Referee: G. Cohen

10 April 1971	Beitar Tel Aviv	2–2 (a.e.t.) (4–3 p)	Hapoel Be'er Sheva	Hapoel Petah Tikva ground
	Nimni 12'; Belanero 65'		Eliyahu 32'; Barad 39'	Attendance: 3000; Referee: Eitan
	Penalties
	Nimni (penalty scored); Lerman (penalty scored); Ben-Shimon (penalty scored); Hoftmann (penalty scored)		(penalty missed) Eliyahu; (penalty scored) H. Cohen; (penalty scored) Ben-Dor; (penalty missed) Admon; (penalty scored) Dahan

10 April 1971	Hapoel Rishon LeZion	2–7	Hapoel Jerusalem
	Madmoni 48'; M. Cohen 63' (pen.)		Singel 15', 28'; Ben Rimoz 18', 44' (pen.), 60', 80'; Turjeman 53'	Attendance: 4000; Referee: Straschnov

10 April 1971	Hapoel Kiryat Ono	0–1	Shimshon Tel Aviv
			Fuss 50'	Attendance: 1500; Referee: Prohaski

10 April 1971	Hakoah Maccabi Ramat Gan	3–1 (a.e.t.)	Maccabi Jaffa	HaMakhtesh Stadium
	Heftel 74'; Shaharbani 109', 118'		Onana 58'	Attendance: 2000; Referee: Handwerg

10 April 1971	Hapoel Beit Shemesh	0–1	Hapoel Holon	Hapoel Jerusalem ground
			Shem-Tov 45'	Attendance: 2000; Referee: Lenciano

10 April 1971	Hapoel Acre	1–2	Maccabi Netanya	Nahariya Municipal Stadium
	Asayag 87'		Shlomovich 40'; Spiegler 82'	Attendance: 6000; Referee: Tilinger

10 April 1971	Sektzia Nes Tziona	0–1	Bnei Yehuda
			Ozeri 41'	Attendance: 2500; Referee: Solomonovich

10 April 1971	Maccabi Tel Aviv	3–0	Hapoel Herzliya	Bloomfield Stadium
	Bar-Nur 31', 69'; Ozeri 33'			Attendance: 5000; Referee: Ashkar

10 April 1971	Hapoel Petah Tikva	5–1 (a.e.t.)	Hapoel Givat Olga	Hapoel Petah Tikva ground
	Hayek 51' (104); Rosenthal 92'; Tzelinker 112'; Cohen 119'		Havia 59' (o.g.)	Attendance: 2000; Referee: Ankri

=== Seventh Round ===
1 May 1971	Hapoel Tel Aviv	2–0	Hapoel Kfar Saba	Bloomfield Stadium
	Chazom 55', 58'			Attendance: 12000; Referee: Mizrahi

1 May 1971	Maccabi Petah Tikva	2–2 (a.e.t.) (5–6 p)	Beitar Jerusalem
	Begbleiter 1'; I. Seltzer 23'		Robovich 38', 75'	Attendance: 2000; Referee: Straschnov
	Penalties
	I. Seltzer (penalty scored); Goldhagen (penalty missed); Mizrahi (penalty scored); Hibasch (penalty scored); Rosenthal (penalty missed); Bachar (penalty scored); Feinberg (penalty scored); Makmel (penalty missed)		(penalty scored) Robovich; (penalty scored) Hacham; (penalty missed) Ben-David; (penalty missed) Sarusi; (penalty scored) Jano; (penalty scored) Azulai; (penalty scored) Levin; (penalty scored) Bitton

1 May 1971	Hapoel Haifa	4–0	Hapoel Hadera	Kiryat Haim Stadium
	Shapira 49', 82'; Inchi 55'; Gindin 86'			Attendance: 10000; Referee: Solomonovich

1 May 1971	Maccabi Haifa	1–0	Beitar Tel Aviv	Kiryat Eliezer Stadium
	Levi 36'			Referee: Tedrus

1 May 1971	Hapoel Jerusalem	2–1	Shimshon Tel Aviv
	Azulai 71' (pen.); Turjeman 77'		Masuari 39'	Referee: Arafat

1 May 1971	Hakoah Maccabi Ramat Gan	2–0	Hapoel Holon	HaMakhtesh Stadium
	Shaharbani 40', 86'			Attendance: 1000; Referee: I. Cohen

1 May 1971	Maccabi Netanya	0–1	Bnei Yehuda
			Alaluf 75'	Attendance: 5000; Referee: M. Ashkenazi

1 May 1971	Maccabi Tel Aviv	5–3	Hapoel Petah Tikva
	Spiegel 14', 37'; Heiman 18'; Bar-Nur 68', 78'		Rosendorn 9'; Derhi 73'; Rosenthal 81'	Attendance: 13000; Referee: Handwerg

=== Quarter-finals ===
22 May 1971	Beitar Jerusalem	0–0 (a.e.t.) (3–2 p)	Hapoel Tel Aviv	YMCA Stadium
				Attendance: 5000; Referee: Handwerg
	Penalties
	Robovich (penalty missed); Ben-Ya'akov (penalty scored); Hacham (penalty scored); Jano (penalty missed); Nakash (penalty scored)		(penalty scored) Rachminovich; (penalty scored) Chazom; (penalty missed) Feigenbaum; (penalty missed) Admoni; (penalty missed) Ben Baruch

22 May 1971	Hapoel Haifa	0–1	Maccabi Haifa	Kiryat Haim Stadium
			Levi 19'	Attendance: 12000; Referee: Ashkenazi

22 May 1971	Hapoel Jerusalem	0–0 (a.e.t.) (2–4 p)	Hakoah Maccabi Ramat Gan	Katamon
				Attendance: 8000; Referee: Straschnov
	Penalties
	Ben Rimoz (penalty missed); Singel (penalty scored); Hadad (penalty scored); Mansur (penalty missed)		(penalty scored) Heftel; (penalty missed) Y. Rubinstein; (penalty scored) Shuruk; (penalty scored) M. Rubinstein; (penalty scored) Messing

22 May 1971	Bnei Yehuda	0–0 (a.e.t.) (3–4 p)	Maccabi Tel Aviv	Bloomfield Stadium
				Attendance: 4000; Referee: Ashkenazi
	Penalties
	Shikva (penalty missed); Sulami (penalty scored); Mukhtar (penalty missed); Nahmias (penalty scored); Ozeri (penalty scored)		(penalty scored) Rosen; (penalty scored) Assis; (penalty scored) Bar-Nur; (penalty scored) Ozeri

=== Semi-finals ===
9 June 1971
20:00

Beitar Jerusalem	3–3	Maccabi Haifa
Jano 60'; Sarusi 98', 99'		Levi 80'; Rom 104', 115'
Penalties
Robovich (penalty scored); Ya'akov (penalty scored); Hacham (penalty scored); Nakash (penalty missed); Sarusi (penalty scored)	4–5	(penalty scored) Mintz; (penalty scored) Karanado; (penalty scored) Schwager; (penalty scored) Lubezki; (penalty scored) Levi

Bloomfield Stadium, Tel Aviv
Attendance: 20000
Referee: Ashkenazi

9 June 1971
17:00

Hakoah Maccabi Ramat Gan	3–3 (a.e.t.)	Maccabi Tel Aviv
Yechiel 40'; Farkas 97'; Shaharbani 105'		Spiegel 18' (pen.), 120'; Gershovitz 110'
Penalties
Heftel (penalty scored); Shuruk (penalty scored); M. Rubinstein (penalty scored); Shaharbani (penalty scored); Messing (penalty scored)	5–2	(penalty scored) Rosen; (penalty scored) Bar-Nur; (penalty missed) Nimni

Bloomfield Stadium, Tel Aviv
Attendance: 20000
Referee: Ashkenazi

=== Final ===
16 June 1971

Maccabi Haifa	1–2	Hakoah Maccabi Ramat Gan
Gershgoren 35'		Yechiel 19'; Shaharbani 54'

Bloomfield Stadium, Tel Aviv
Attendance: 18000
Referee: Handwerg
