= 1975–76 Israeli League Cup =

Tournament details
- Country: Israel

Final positions
- Champions: Hapoel Hadera (Leumit); Maccabi Ramat Amidar (Liga Alef)
- Runner-up: Hapoel Tel Aviv (Leumit); Maccabi Haifa (Liga Alef)

Tournament statistics
- Matches played: 13
- Goals scored: 24 (1.85 per match)

The 1975–76 Israeli League Cup (Hebrew: גביע הליגה) was a cup competition played in the beginning of the 1975–76 season, while the national football team was involved in the 1976 Summer Olympics football tournament qualification.

The cup was split into two competitions, for Liga Leumit and Liga Alef. The top tier's competition was played by clubs ranked 1st to 8th in 1974–75 Liga Leumit, while the second tier's competition was played by clubs ranked 1st and 4th in each of 1974–75 Liga Alef division. The competition was played as a knock-out competition.

The Liga Leumit League Cup was won by Hapoel Hadera, who had beaten Hapoel Tel Aviv 1–0 in the final. The Liga Alef League Cup was won by Maccabi Ramat Amidar, who had beaten Maccabi Haifa 2–1 in the final.

== Liga Leumit League Cup ==
=== Quarter-finals ===
20 September 1975	Hapoel Tel Aviv	4–0	Hapoel Haifa	Bloomfield Stadium
	Chazon 60', 72'; Feigenbaum 83', 86'	Davar		Attendance: 5000; Referee: Menachem Ashkenazi

20 September 1975	Shimshon Tel Aviv	1–0	Hapoel Be'er Sheva	Hakufsa, Netanya
	Damti 37'	Davar		Attendance: 2000; Referee: Finkelstein

20 September 1975	Hapoel Jerusalem	2–1 (a.e.t.)	Maccabi Tel Aviv	Katamon, Jerusalem
	Buzaglo 33'; Linker 98' (o.g.)	Davar	Konstantinovsky 75'	Attendance: 3000; Referee: Klein

20 September 1975	Hapoel Hadera	2–0	Maccabi Netanya	Hadera
	Bar 22' (o.g.); Elhadad 90'	Davar		Attendance: 3000; Referee: Moshe Ashkenazi

=== Semi-finals ===
27 September 1975

Hapoel Tel Aviv	1–0 (a.e.t.)	Hapoel Jerusalem
Levi 113'	Davar

Bloomfield Stadium
Attendance: 5000
Referee: Hogeg

27 September 1975

Hapoel Hadera	0–0 (a.e.t.)	Shimshon Tel Aviv
	Davar
Penalties
Argaz (penalty scored); Shafir (penalty scored); Elhadad (penalty scored); Ya'akobovsky (penalty scored); Sofer (penalty missed); Skloot (penalty scored)	5–4	(penalty missed) Tzarfati; (penalty scored) Wajima; (penalty scored) Borba; (penalty scored) Mizrahi; (penalty scored) Yefet; (penalty missed) Damti

Hadera
Attendance: 3500
Referee: Rabinovich

=== Final ===
4 October 1975

Hapoel Tel Aviv	0–1	Hapoel Hadera
	Davar	Ya'akobovsky 39'

Bloomfield Stadium
Attendance: 12000
Referee: Eitan

== Liga Alef League Cup ==
=== Quarter-finals ===
13 September 1975	Hapoel Yehud	1–1 (a.e.t.) (1–2 p)	Maccabi Haifa	Lod Municipal Stadium
	Ben-Shitrit 8'		Gershgoren 57'	Attendance: 2000; Referee: Levi

13 September 1975	Hapoel Acre	3–0	Hapoel Bat Yam	Napoleon Stadium, Acre
	Z. Asayag 20' (55); Shitrit 58'			Attendance: 1000; Referee: Tamir

13 September 1975	Hapoel Netnaya	0–0 (a.e.t.) (4–2 p)	Hapoel Ramat Gan	Hapoel Netanya ground
				Attendance: 1500; Referee: Ben-Ami
	Penalties
	Benk (penalty scored); Tshuva (penalty scored); Bleiberg (penalty scored); Faraj (penalty missed); Sheleg (penalty scored)		(penalty missed) Denishevski; (penalty missed) Sorinov; (penalty scored) Naim; (penalty scored) Kalderon

13 September 1975	Maccabi Ramat Amidar	w/o (Note: Hapoel Rishon LeZion failed to appear to the match as the players went on strike to support the management, which had been ousted by Hapoel executives.)	Hapoel Rishon LeZion

=== Semi-finals ===
27 September 1975

Maccabi Haifa	1–0	Hapoel Acre
Agami 27'

Kiryat Eliezer Stadium
Attendance: 7000
Referee: Loya

27 September 1975

Maccabi Ramat Amidar	2–1	Hapoel Netanya
Cohen 68'; Peltz 72'		Vilner 89'

Ramat Amidar
Attendance: 3000

=== Final ===
4 October 1975

Maccabi Haifa	1–2	Maccabi Ramat Amidar
Levy 65'		Paikin 16'; Petlz 71'

Kiryat Eliezer Stadium
Attendance: 7000
Referee: Hogeg
