= Sarusi =

Sarusi is a surname. Notable people with the surname include:

- Rafi Sarusi (born 1981), Israeli footballer
- Victor Sarusi (1945–2026), Israeli footballer
