= Efraim Amira =

Israeli footballer

Efraim Amira אפרים אמירה
Personal information
- Full name: Efraim Amira
- Date of birth: 1949
- Place of birth: Israel
- Date of death: 8 August 2023 (aged 74)
- Position: Attacking midfielder

Senior career*
Years	Team	Apps	(Gls)
1966–1976	Maccabi Netanya	268	(17)
1976–1977	Hapoel Netanya		
1977–1979	Maccabi Netanya		
- * Club domestic league appearances and goals

Efraim Amira (Hebrew: אפרים אמירה) was an Israeli footballer who is most famous for being a major part in the success of Maccabi Netanya in the 1970s.

== Honours ==
- Israeli Premier League (3):
  - 1970-71, 1973-74, 1977-78
- State Cup (1):
  - 1978
- Israeli Supercup (3):
  - 1971, 1974, 1978
- UEFA Intertoto Cup (1):
  - 1978
