= Shlomi Vilner =

Israeli footballer

Shlomi Vilner שלומי וילנר
Personal information
- Full name: Shlomi Vilner
- Date of birth: 2 February 1978
- Place of birth: Netanya, Israel
- Date of death: 4 November 2009 (aged 31)
- Position: Midfielder

Youth career
- Maccabi Netanya

Senior career*
| Years | Team | Apps | (Gls) |
| 1996–1998 | Maccabi Netanya | | |
| 1998–1999 | Ironi Nir Ramat HaSharon | | |
| 1999–2001 | Hapoel Bat Yam | | |
- * Club domestic league appearances and goals

Shlomi Vilner (Hebrew: שלומי וילנר; 2 February 1978 – 4 November 2009) was an Israeli footballer.

He was the son of Yehuda Vilner and the older brother of Liron Vilner, who also played for Maccabi Netanya.
