= Yosef Sorinov =

Israeli footballer (1946–2019)

Yosef Sorinov יוסף סורינוב
Personal information
- Full name: Yosef Sorinov
- Date of birth: 17 May 1946
- Place of birth: Legnica, Poland
- Date of death: 1 February 2019 (aged 72)
- Place of death: Jerusalem, Israel

Senior career*
Years	Team	Apps	(Gls)
1964–1966	Beitar Tel Aviv		
1966–1971	Maccabi Netanya		
1971–1975	Beitar Jerusalem		
1975–1976	Hapoel Ramat Gan		
1976–1978	Maccabi Tel Aviv		

International career
1971–1977	Israel	19	(0)
- * Club domestic league appearances and goals

Yosef Sorinov (Hebrew: יוסף סורינוב; 17 May 1946 – 1 February 2019) was an Israeli footballer.

== Honours ==
- Championships
  - 1970–71
