= Shraga Topolansky =

Israeli footballer (born 1950)

Shraga Topolansky שרגא טופולנסקי
Personal information
- Date of birth: 1950
- Position: Centre-back

Youth career
- Maccabi Netanya

Senior career*
Years	Team	Apps	(Gls)
1967–1975	Maccabi Netanya	195	(12)
1975–1979	Beitar Tel Aviv		(12)
1979–1980	St Kilda Hakoah	10	(0)
1980–1981	West Adelaide	45	(0)
1981–1984	Beitar Tel Aviv		(9)

International career
1968–1969	Israel U19		

Managerial career
- Beitar Haifa
- 2005–2006: Ironi Or Akiva
- 2006–2009: Maccabi Emek Hefer
- 2009–2011: Beitar Tubruk
- 2013: Beitar Hadera
- * Club domestic league appearances and goals

Shraga Topolansky (Hebrew: שרגא טופולנסקי; born 1950) is an Israeli former professional footballer who played as a centre-back for Maccabi Netanya, Beitar Tel Aviv and in the National Soccer League and the Victorian Premier League in Australia. Today he works as a manager, with Beitar Hadera being the last team he managed.

Topolansky also won five caps for his Israel national team between 1969 and 1978; however, all of them were friendly games that are not recognised by Israel Football Association as official games.

== Honours ==
- Israeli Premier League: 1970–71, 1973–74; runner-up 1974–75
- State Cup runner-up: 1970, 1977
- Israeli Supercup: 1971, 1974
- NSL Cup runner-up: 1981
- Israeli Second Division: 1982–83

Individual

- Footballer of the Year – Israel: 1976–77
