= Yehoshua Gal =

Israeli footballer

Yehoshua Gal יהושע גל
Personal information
- Full name: Yehoshua Gal
- Date of birth: 5 July 1951 (age 75)
- Place of birth: Netanya, Israel
- Position: Forward

Youth career
- Maccabi Netanya

Senior career*
Years	Team	Apps	(Gls)
1969–1977	Maccabi Netanya	136	(6)
1973–1975	Maccabi Haifa F.C. (loan)	32	(2)
Total		168	(8)

International career
1971–1976	Israel	2	(0)
- * Club domestic league appearances and goals

Yehoshua Gal (Hebrew: יהושע גל; born 5 July 1951) is a former Israeli footballer.

== Honours ==
- Championships
  - 1970–71
- Israeli Supercup
  - 1971
