= Liron Vilner =

Israeli footballer

Liron Vilner לירון וילנר
Personal information
- Full name: Liron Vilner
- Date of birth: February 7, 1979 (age 47)
- Place of birth: Netanya, Israel
- Position: Striker

Youth career
- Maccabi Netanya

Senior career*
Years	Team	Apps	(Gls)
1995–1998	Maccabi Netanya	93	(28)
1998–1999	Maccabi Haifa	11	(0)
1999	→ Maccabi Herzliya (loan)	7	(0)
1999–2006	Maccabi Netanya	141	(39)
2003	→ Bnei Yehuda (loan)	9	(1)
2006	→ Hakoah Ramat Gan (loan)	?	(?)
2006–2007	Bnei Sakhnin	40	(10)
2007–2008	Hapoel Haifa	19	(5)
2008	Hapoel Ra'anana	10	(0)
2009–2010	Hapoel Hadera	12	(4)
2010	Maccabi HaShikma Ramat Hen	7	(1)

International career
1998–2000	Israel U21	6	(0)
- * Club domestic league appearances and goals

Liron Vilner (Hebrew: לירון וילנר; born 7 February 1979) is a retired second generation Israeli footballer (the son of Yehuda Vilner) and the younger brother of Shlomi Vilner.

== Honours ==
- Israeli Youth Championship:
  - Winner (1): 1994-95
- Youth State Cup:
  - Winner (1): 1996
- Israeli Second Division:
  - Runner-up (2): 2004-05, 2006–07
- Toto Cup (Leumit):
  - Winner (1): 2004-05
- Israeli Beach Soccer League:
  - Runner-up (1): 2009
