= Moshe Yosef (footballer) =

Israeli footballer

Moshe Yosef משה יוסף
Personal information
- Full name: Moshe Yosef

Senior career*
Years	Team	Apps	(Gls)
1960–1973	Maccabi Netanya	234	(3)
- * Club domestic league appearances and goals

Moshe Yosef (Hebrew: משה יוסף) is a former Israeli footballer who played in Maccabi Netanya and was a part of the team that won the 1970-71 championship.

== Honours ==
- Israeli Premier League (1):
  - 1970-71
