= Rafi Tshuva =

Israeli footballer

Rafi Tshuva רפי תשובה
Personal information
- Full name: Rafi Tshuva
- Date of birth: September 22, 1957 (age 69)
- Place of birth: Netanya, Israel
- Position: Striker

Youth career
- Hapoel Netanya

Senior career*
Years	Team	Apps	(Gls)
1974–1978	Hapoel Netanya		
1978–1984	Beitar Tel Aviv		

International career
1979	Israel	1	(0)
- * Club domestic league appearances and goals

Rafi Tshuva (Hebrew: רפי תשובה) is a former Israeli footballer.
