= Haim Bachar =

Israeli footballer (born 1943)

Haim Bachar חיים בכר
Personal information
- Date of birth: 10 July 1943 (age 83)
- Place of birth: Petah Tikva, Mandatory Palestine
- Height: 1.80 m (5 ft 11 in)
- Position: Defender

Youth career
- 1953–1960: Hapoel Petah Tikva

Senior career*
Years	Team	Apps	(Gls)
1960–1975	Hapoel Petah Tikva	259	(17)

International career
1964–1965	Israel	7	(0)
- * Club domestic league appearances and goals

Haim Bachar (Hebrew: חיים בכר; born 10 July 1943) was an Israeli footballer who played in defender positions. He played for Hapoel Petah Tikva and the Israel national team.

== Club career ==
Matania started his football career in 1953, at the age of 10, when he joined the boys' team of Hapoel Petah Tikva. On 21 May 1960 made his senior debut in the senior team when Hapoel won 8–0 Beitar Tel Aviv and also scored his debut goal.

== International career ==
Matania earned 7 caps with the Israel national team. His debut was on 26 May 1964, made his international debut in the 1–0 win against Hong Kong.

Bachar won with the international team in 1964 AFC Asian Cup.

== Honours ==
Hapoel Petah Tikva

- Israel Championships (2): 1961–62, 1962–63

Israel

- AFC Asian Cup (1): 1964
