= Rafi Sarusi =

Israeli footballer

Rafi Sarusi רפי סרוסי
Personal information
- Full name: Rafi Sarusi
- Date of birth: January 15, 1981 (age 45)
- Place of birth: Netanya, Israel
- Position: Left back

Youth career
- Beitar Nes Tubruk

Senior career*
Years	Team	Apps	(Gls)
2002–2006	Maccabi Netanya	26	(1)
2003–2004	→ Ironi Ramat HaSharon		
2006	Hapoel Jerusalem	7	(0)
2007–2008	Maccabi Ahi Nazareth	29	(0)
2008–2009	Hapoel Acre	2	(0)
2009–2011	Maccabi HaShikma Ramat Hen	34	(2)
2011–2013	Maccabi Ironi Kfar Yona	54	(3)
- * Club domestic league appearances and goals

Rafi Sarusi (Hebrew: רפי סרוסי; born January 15, 1981) is an Israeli footballer.

== Honours ==
- Israeli Second Division:
  - Runner-up (2): 2004–05, 2008–09
