= Yehuda Vilner =

Israeli footballer

Yehuda Vilner יהודה וילנר
Personal information
- Full name: Yehuda Vilner
- Date of birth: 28 March 1951 (age 75)
- Place of birth: Israel
- Position: Striker

Youth career
- Hapoel Netanya

Senior career*
Years	Team	Apps	(Gls)
1967–1979	Hapoel Netanya		
1977–1979	→ Bnei Yehuda (loan)	?	(2)
- Maccabi Netanya
- Hapoel Ramat Gan
- * Club domestic league appearances and goals

Yehuda Vilner (Hebrew: יהודה וילנר) is a former Israeli footballer.

He is the father of Shlomi and Liron Vilner.

== Honours ==
- Israeli Second Division (1):
  - 1977–78
