= Eli Ben Rimoz =

Israeli international footballer

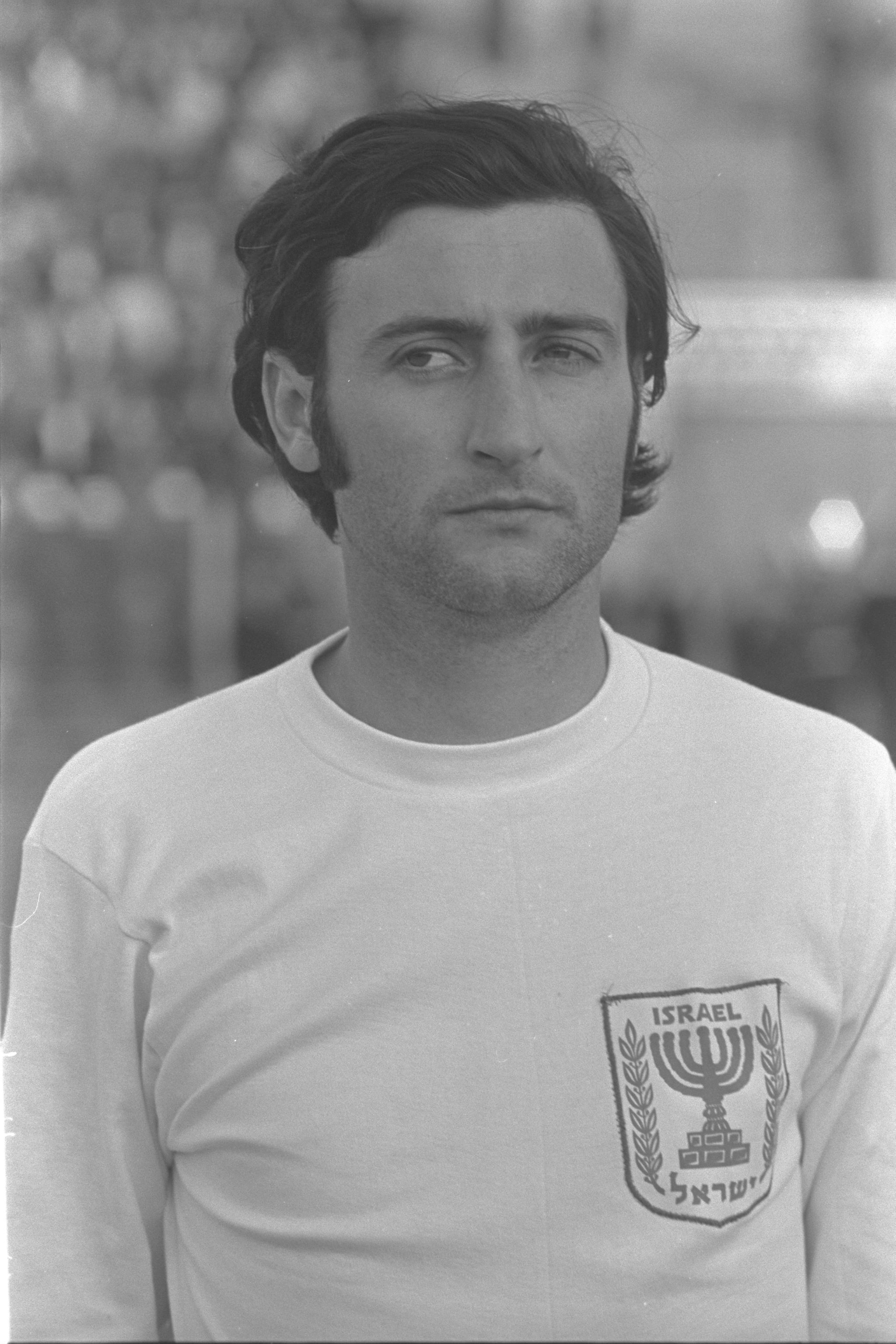

Personal information
- Full name: Eliahu Ben Rimoz
- Date of birth: 20 November 1944 (age 81)
- Place of birth: France
- Position: Striker

Senior career*
Years	Team	Apps	(Gls)
1962–1976	Hapoel Jerusalem	252	(76)
1976–1977	Bnei Yehuda Tel Aviv	20	(5)
1977–1979	Hapoel Jerusalem	47	(4)
Total		319	(85)

International career
1970	Israel	1	(0)
- * Club domestic league appearances and goals

Eliahu Ben Rimoz (Hebrew: אלי בן רימוז; born 20 November 1944) is an Israeli former international footballer who competed at the 1970 FIFA World Cup.

== Early life ==
Ben Rimoz was born in France. When he was 3 years old, his family emigrated to Israel, initially living in Petah Tikva, before moving to the Katamon neighbourhood in Jerusalem. aged 8

== Career ==
Ben Rimoz played club football for Hapoel Jerusalem and Bnei Yehuda Tel Aviv, scoring 85 goals in 319 league games and 106 goals in 351 games in all competitions.

Ben Rimoz played in one official game for the Israeli national side.
