= Yehezkel Chazom =

Israeli footballer (1947–2023)

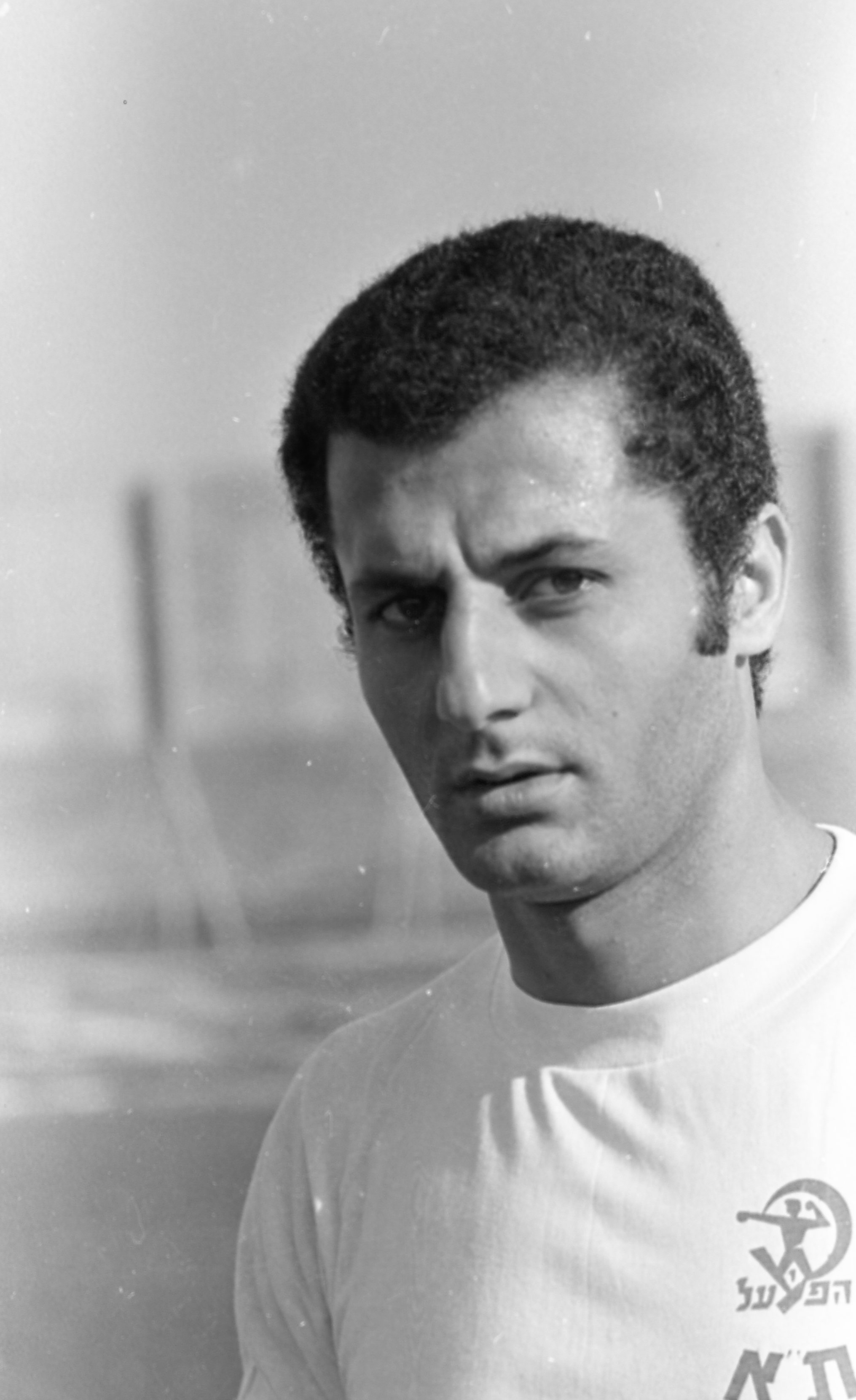
- Chazom in 1969

Personal information
- Date of birth: 1947
- Place of birth: Iraq
- Date of death: 21 March 2023 (aged 76)
- Position: Forward

Senior career*
Years	Team	Apps	(Gls)
1964–1977	Hapoel Tel Aviv	324	(97)

International career
1965–1973	Israel	5	(0)
- * Club domestic league appearances and goals

Yehezkel Chazom (Hebrew: יחזקאל חזום, also spelled Yehezkel Hazum; 1947 – 21 March 2023) was an Israeli footballer who played as a forward for Hapoel Tel Aviv. He competed at the 1970 FIFA World Cup, having previously played for the Israel national team during the 1966 World Cup qualifying campaign.

== Early life ==
Chazom was born in Iraq and emigrated to Israel with his family at a young age.

== Career ==
Chazom scored 97 goals in 324 league games for Hapoel Tel Aviv.

Chazom played in five official games for the Israel national team.

== Death ==
He died on 21 March 2023, at the age of 76. He was buried in Holon Cemetery.
