= Asher Messing =

Israeli footballer and manager

Asher Messing אשר מסינג
Personal information
- Full name: Asher Messing
- Date of birth: March 12, 1947 (age 79)
- Place of birth: Israel
- Position: Midfielder

Youth career
- Hapoel Petah Tikva

Senior career*
Years	Team	Apps	(Gls)
1968–19??	Hapoel Petah Tikva	23	

Managerial career
- 1998: Maccabi Netanya
- Hapoel Ramat Gan
- * Club domestic league appearances and goals

Asher Messing (Hebrew: אשר מסינג) is a former Israeli footballer and manager.
