= Napoleon Stadium =

Multi-use stadium in Israel

Coordinates: 32°55′20.96″N 35°5′4.84″E

- Interactive map of Napoleon Stadium
- Full name: Napoleon Stadium
- Location: Acre, Israel
- Capacity: 5,000

Tenant
- Hapoel Acre (until 2010)

Napoleon Stadium is a multi-use stadium in Acre, Israel. It was mostly used for football matches and hosted the home games of Hapoel Acre. The capacity of the stadium was 5,000 spectators at its peak. The stadium is used for Hapoel Acre training. The stadium was named for Napoleon Bonaparte.
