= Victor Sarusi =

Israeli footballer (1944/1945–2026)

Victor Sarusi ויקטור סרוסי
Personal information
- Date of birth: 1944 or 1945
- Date of death: 8 February 2026 (aged 81)
- Position: Forward

Youth career
- Maccabi Netanya

Senior career*
Years	Team	Apps	(Gls)
1960–1969	Maccabi Netanya	139	(79)
1969–1971	Beitar Jerusalem	57	(16)
1971–1976	Maccabi Netanya	109	(50)
1976–1977	Hapoel Hadera	19	(11)
1977–1978	Hapoel Be'er Sheva	22	(9)
1978–1979	Hapoel Petah Tikva	20	(4)
Total		366	(169)

International career
1972	Israel	2	(1)
- * Club domestic league appearances and goals

Victor Sarusi (Hebrew: ויקטור סרוסי; 1944 or 1945 – 8 February 2026) was an Israeli footballer who played as a forward. He died on 8 February 2026, at the age of 81.

== Honours ==
Maccabi Netanya

- Israeli Premier League: 1973–74
