= 1970–71 Liga Leumit =

Football season

Liga Leumit
- Season: 1970–71
- Champions: Maccabi Netanya; 1st title
- Relegated: Maccabi Petah Tikva; Hapoel Holon
- Top goalscorer: Eli Ben-Rimoz (20)

The 1970–71 Liga Leumit season saw Maccabi Netanya win their first title. Maccabi Petah Tikva and Hapoel Holon (in their first and only season in the top division) were both relegated. Eli Ben-Rimoz of Hapoel Jerusalem was the league's top scorer with 20 goals.

== Final table ==
Pos	Team	Pld	W	D	L	GF	GA	GD	Pts	Qualification or relegation
1	Maccabi Netanya	30	20	7	3	44	18	+26	47	Qualified for 1972 Asian Champion Club Tournament
2	Shimshon Tel Aviv	30	12	12	6	31	25	+6	36	
3	Hapoel Tel Aviv	30	15	5	10	35	30	+5	35	
4	Hapoel Petah Tikva	30	11	12	7	26	17	+9	34	
5	Beitar Tel Aviv	30	13	7	10	26	24	+2	33	
6	Hapoel Haifa	30	9	13	8	32	25	+7	31	
7	Hapoel Jerusalem	30	10	10	10	39	32	+7	30	
8	Hakoah Ramat Gan	30	9	12	9	26	25	+1	30	
9	Hapoel Kfar Saba	30	8	13	9	30	24	+6	29	
10	Maccabi Tel Aviv	30	8	13	9	33	35	−2	29	
11	Beitar Jerusalem	30	8	10	12	35	36	−1	26	
12	Maccabi Haifa	30	6	14	10	20	26	−6	26	
13	Bnei Yehuda	30	7	12	11	19	29	−10	26	
14	Hapoel Hadera	30	6	13	11	21	28	−7	25	
15	Maccabi Petah Tikva	30	8	9	13	30	39	−9	25	Relegated to Liga Alef
16	Hapoel Holon	30	4	10	16	20	54	−34	18	Relegated to Liga Alef

Source: rsssf.com

== Results ==
Home \ Away	BEI	BTA	BnY	HAR	HAH	HHA	HHO	HJE	HKS	HPT	HTA	MHA	MNE	MPT	MTA	STA
Beitar Jerusalem	—	4–0	2–1	2–0	2–2	3–0	4–1	1–1	0–0	0–0	1–2	1–1	0–0	3–3	2–2	1–1
Beitar Tel Aviv	1–0	—	2–0	1–0	1–1	0–0	2–0	0–2	0–1	2–1	1–0	2–1	0–1	0–0	1–2	0–0
Bnei Yehuda	1–0	0–0	—	0–0	0–1	0–2	3–0	0–0	0–0	0–0	0–0	2–1	1–3	2–1	1–1	1–2
Hakoah Ramat Gan	2–1	2–1	0–0	—	2–0	1–1	1–2	1–1	0–0	1–2	2–1	0–0	1–1	3–1	1–1	0–0
Hapoel Hadera	2–0	0–0	1–0	2–1	—	1–2	0–0	0–2	1–1	0–1	1–2	1–1	0–2	0–0	3–1	0–1
Hapoel Haifa	5–1	0–1	2–1	0–1	1–1	—	0–0	1–1	2–0	0–0	0–1	1–1	2–1	4–1	0–0	0–1
Hapoel Holon	1–0	2–3	3–1	0–2	0–0	0–0	—	1–0	1–1	0–0	1–3	0–0	1–5	0–0	1–1	1–2
Hapoel Jerusalem	1–2	0–0	5–0	2–0	1–0	0–2	3–0	—	2–2	0–1	0–0	2–0	2–3	2–0	4–1	0–2
Hapoel Kfar Saba	2–0	0–1	1–0	0–1	1–1	0–0	5–0	1–1	—	2–0	0–2	2–0	1–0	0–1	0–1	2–2
Hapoel Petah Tikva	0–0	0–1	0–1	2–0	1–1	0–0	5–0	2–0	0–0	—	0–2	2–0	0–0	1–0	2–1	0–0
Hapoel Tel Aviv	4–2	1–3	0–1	1–3	0–0	1–0	3–0	4–2	0–4	3–2	—	1–0	0–0	1–0	1–0	0–2
Maccabi Haifa	1–0	0–1	0–0	1–0	2–0	0–0	0–0	0–0	1–1	0–0	3–1	—	0–1	2–0	0–0	1–0
Maccabi Netanya	1–0	1–0	0–0	1–0	1–0	2–2	3–2	2–1	1–0	1–0	1–0	4–1	—	0–0	2–1	1–2
Maccabi Petah Tikva	0–1	2–1	0–1	0–0	0–1	2–1	3–2	5–1	1–1	1–1	1–0	2–1	1–3	—	1–3	1–0
Maccabi Tel Aviv	1–0	2–1	2–2	1–1	1–1	3–1	1–0	0–2	3–1	0–1	0–1	1–1	0–1	1–1	—	1–1
Shimshon Tel Aviv	0–2	1–0	0–0	0–0	1–0	1–3	3–1	1–1	2–1	1–2	0–0	1–1	0–2	3–2	1–1	—

Legend: Blue = home team win; Yellow = draw; Red = away team win.
