= List of Israeli football transfers summer 2013 =

This is a list of Israeli football transfers for the 2013 summer transfer window

== Ligat Ha'Al ==
=== Maccabi Tel Aviv ===
In:

No.	Pos.	Nation	Player
—	GK	ESP	Juan Pablo Colinas (from (Spain) Sporting Gijón)
—	GK	ISR	Guy Haimov (was on loan to (Cyprus) AEK Larnaca)
—	DF	ISR	Omri Ben Harush (from Maccabi Netanya)
—	DF	ESP	Mané (from (Spain) Getafe)
—	MF	SRB	Nikola Mitrović (from (Hungary) Videoton)
—	MF	ISR	Dan Einbinder (from Hapoel Ironi Kiryat Shmona)
—	MF	ISR	Tamir Kahlon (was on loan to Hapoel Acre)
—	MF	ISR	Ben Ben Yair (was on loan to Hapoel Ramat Gan)
—	MF	ISR	Omri Altman (on loan from (England) Fulham)
—	FW	ISR	Barak Itzhaki (was on loan to (Cyprus) Antorthosis)
—	FW	ISR	Tal Ben Haim (from Hapoel Tel Aviv)

Out:

No.	Pos.	Nation	Player
—	GK	ISR	Gal Tuvali (on loan to Maccabi Kabilio Jaffa)
—	GK	NGA	Vincent Enyeama (was on loan from (France) Lille OSC)
—	GK	ISR	Guy Haimov (to Hapoel Ironi Kiryat Shmona)
—	DF	ISR	Dean Akafi (on loan to Maccabi Herzliya)
—	DF	ISR	Osher Abu (on loan to Hapoel Jerusalem)
—	DF	ISR	Rotem Bouskila (on loan to Hapoel Jerusalem)
—	DF	ISR	Omer Vered (Free Agent)
—	MF	ISR	Tamir Kahlon (to Hapoel Ironi Kiryat Shmona)
—	MF	ISR	Ben Ben Yair (to Ironi Nir Ramat HaSharon)
—	MF	ISR	Hasan Abu Zaid (on loan to Ironi Nir Ramat HaSharon)
—	MF	ISR	Assaf Madar (on loan to Hapoel Ra'anana)
—	MF	ISR	Sharon Ziso (on loan to Beitar Tel Aviv Ramla)
—	FW	ESP	Gonzalo García (on loan to (Cyprus) Antorthosis)
—	FW	ISR	Eliran Atar (to (France) Stade de Reims)
—	FW	ISR	Roi Kahat (on loan to Maccabi Yavne)
—	FW	ISR	Roberto Colautti (to (Cyprus) Antorthosis)
—	FW	NGA	Lary Kahinda (on loan to Hakoah Amidar Ramat Gan)
—	FW	ISR	Eli Zizov (to Hapoel Acre)

=== Maccabi Haifa ===
In:

No.	Pos.	Nation	Player
—	DF	ISR	El'ad Gabai (from Hapoel Ironi Kiryat Shmona)
—	DF	ISR	Sari Falach (was on loan to Bnei Yehuda Tel Aviv)
—	DF	ISR	Ahmed Sha'aban (was on loan to Hapoel Ra'anana)
—	MF	ESP	Rubén Rayos (from (Greece) Asteras Tripolis)
—	MF	ISR	Sintayehu Sallalich (was on loan to Hapoel Ironi Kiryat Shmona)
—	MF	ISR	Ran Abukarat (from Hapoel Haifa)
—	MF	ISR	Mohammad Ghadir (was on loan to (Belgium) Waasland-Beveren)
—	MF	ISR	Eran Rozenbaum (was on loan to Sektzia Nes Tziona)
—	FW	USA	Noah Sadaoui (was on loan to Hapoel Kfar Saba)
—	FW	ISR	Shimon Abuhatzira (from Hapoel Ironi Kiryat Shmona)

Out:

No.	Pos.	Nation	Player
—	GK	ISR	Nir Davidovich (Retired)
—	DF	ISR	Amir Nasar A Din (on loan to Bnei Sakhnin)
—	DF	ISR	Emri Zaid (on loan to Maccabi Ahi Nazareth)
—	DF	ISR	Oded Elkayam (to Hapoel Ironi Kiryat Shmona)
—	DF	ISR	Orel Dgani (on loan to Hapoel Tel Aviv)
—	DF	ISR	Ahmed Sha'aban (on loan to Hapoel Nazareth Illit)
—	MF	ISR	Dela Yampulski (to Hapoel Haifa)
—	MF	ISR	Mohammad Ghadir (on loan to Bnei Sakhnin)
—	MF	ISR	Dor Kochav (on loan to Hapoel Afula)
—	MF	ISR	Liroy Zhairi (was on loan from (Belgium) KV Mechelen)
—	MF	ISR	Eran Rozenbaum (on loan to Hapoel Nazareth Illit)
—	MF	ISR	Tamir Cohen (to Hapoel Ra'anana)
—	MF	ISR	Sintayehu Sallalich (on loan to Beitar Jerusalem)
—	FW	USA	Noah Sadaoui (on loan to Hapoel Nazareth Illit)
—	FW	ISR	Roi Atar (on loan to Hapoel Acre)
—	FW	ISR	Raz Stain (on loan to Hapoel Katamon)
—	FW	CAN	Daniel Haber (to (Cyprus) Apollon)

=== Hapoel Tel Aviv ===
In:

No.	Pos.	Nation	Player
—	GK	ISR	Danny Amos (from Hapoel Ironi Kiryat Shmona)
—	GK	ISR	Arik Yanko (was on loan to Hakoah Amidar Ramat Gan)
—	DF	ISR	Orel Dgani (on loan from Maccabi Haifa)
—	DF	NED	Jurgen Colin (from (Cyprus) Antorthosis)
—	DF	SVN	Branko Ilič (rom (Cyprus) Antorthosis)
—	DF	ISR	Arthur Atzianov (was on loan to Hapoel Ramat Gan)
—	DF	ISR	Ze'ev Haimovich (was on loan to Hapoel Ramat Gan)
—	DF	ISR	Avraham Chekol (from Hapoel Kfar Saba)
—	DF	ISR	Lior Levi (from Ironi Kiryat Shmona)
—	MF	ISR	Yisrael Zaguri (from Hapoel Ramat Gan)
—	MF	ISR	Mahmoud Abbas (was on loan to Bnei Sakhnin)
—	MF	USA	Bryan Gerzicich (from Hapoel Ironi Kiryat Shmona)
—	MF	BRA	Lucas Sasha (from (Bulgaria) CSKA Sofia)
—	MF	ISR	Sean Malka (was on loan to Hapoel Petah Tikva)
—	MF	MKD	Besart Abdurahimi (on loan from (Croatia) NK Zagreb)
—	FW	ISR	Itay Shechter (from (Germany) 1. FC Kaiserslautern)
—	FW	ISR	Omer Fadida (from Hapoel Kfar Saba)
—	FW	ISR	Ran Itzhak (from Hapoel Ramat Gan)
—	FW	ISR	Reef Mesika (from Hapol Bnei Lod)

Out:

No.	Pos.	Nation	Player
—	GK	ARM	Apoula Edel (Free agent)
—	GK	ISR	Arik Yanko (to Hapoel Ra'anana)
—	DF	ISR	Walid Badir (Retired)
—	DF	POR	Tiago Costa (to (Cyprus) Doxa)
—	DF	GHA	John Paintsil (to (South Africa) Santos)
—	DF	ESP	David Rochela (was on loan from (Spain) Deportivo)
—	DF	ISR	Kfir Eizenstein (on loan to Ironi Bat Yam)
—	DF	ISR	Tomer Ben Yosef (Free agent)
—	DF	MNE	Savo Pavićević (to (Cyprus) Antorthosis)
—	DF	ISR	Mor Shushan (to Bnei Sakhnin)
—	DF	ISR	Eliran Danin (to Hapoel Acre)
—	MF	ISR	Almog Cohen (was on loan from (Germany) 1. FC Nurnberg)
—	MF	ISR	Nir Nachum (to Hapoel Rishon LeZion)
—	MF	CMR	Eric Djemba-Djemba (to (Serbia) Partizan)
—	MF	ISR	Hanan Maman (to (Belgium) Waasland-Beveren)
—	MF	ISR	Alroey Cohen (to Maccabi Petah Tikva)
—	MF	ISR	Mahmoud Abbas (to Hapoel Bnei Lod)
—	FW	ISR	Tal Ben Hain (to Maccabi Tel Aviv)
—	FW	ISR	Toto Tamuz (to (Russia) Ural)

=== Bnei Yehuda Tel Aviv ===
In:

No.	Pos.	Nation	Player
—	DF	ISR	Ben Vehava (from Ironi Kiryat Shmona)
—	DF	ARG	Emiliano Fusco ( (Cyprus) Alki Larnaca)
—	DF	ISR	Ben Zhairi (was on loan to Hapoel Kfar Saba)
—	MF	SEN	Yoro Lamine ( (Armenia) Shirak FC)
—	MF	ISR	Liroy Zhairi (from (Belgium) KV Mechelen)
—	FW	ISR	Izhak Nash (was on loan to F.C. Ashdod)

Out:

No.	Pos.	Nation	Player
—	DF	ISR	Nadav Muniss (on loan to Maccabi Yavne)
—	DF	ISR	Lior Bargig (on loan to Hakoah Amidar Ramat Gan)
—	DF	ISR	Ben Zhairi (on loan to Hapoel Petah Tikva)
—	DF	ISR	Sari Falach (was on loan from Maccabi Haifa)
—	MF	ARG	Pedro Galván (to Maccabi Petah Tikva)
—	MF	SRB	Nenad Marinković (to Hapoel Acre)
—	MF	ISR	Shalev Menashe (to Maccabi Netanya)
—	FW	ISR	Izhak Nash (to Hakoah Amidar Ramat Gan)

=== Hapoel Ironi Kiryat Shmona ===
In:

No.	Pos.	Nation	Player
—	GK	ISR	Guy Haimov (from Maccabi Tel Aviv)
—	DF	BRA	Kassio (from (China) Changchun Yatai)
—	DF	ISR	Hen Dilmoni (from Beitar Tel Aviv)
—	DF	ISR	Ben Vehava (was on loan to Hapoel Be'er Sheva)
—	DF	ISR	Oded Elkayam (from Maccabi Haifa)
—	DF	ISR	Matan Ohayon (from Free agent)
—	MF	ISR	Tamir Kahlon (from Maccabi Tel Aviv)
—	MF	ISR	Moshe Abutbul ([from Ironi Nir Ramat HaSharon)
—	MF	ISR	Vladimir Brown (from Hapoel Ramat Gan)
—	MF	ISR	Adi Elisha (was on loan to Hapoel Ra'anana)
—	MF	LTU	Mindaugas Panka (from (Poland) Ruch Chorzów)
—	FW	CTA	David Manga (from (Serbia) Partizan, was on loan at Hapoel Ramat Gan)
—	FW	ISR	Achmad Saba'a (from Maccabi Netanya)
—	FW	ISR	Barak Badash (was on loan at (Belgium) Waasland-Beveren)

Out:

No.	Pos.	Nation	Player
—	GK	ISR	Danny Amos (to Hapoel Tel Aviv)
—	GK	ISR	Itamar Nitzan (on loan to Ironi Nir Ramat HaSharon)
—	DF	ISR	Lior Levi (to Hapoel Tel Aviv)
—	DF	ISR	Ben Vehava (to Bnei Yehuda Tel Aviv)
—	DF	ISR	Salah Hasarma (Retired)
—	DF	ISR	Mekonanat Yazao (on loan to Hapoel Migdal Ha'emek)
—	DF	ISR	Mor Dahan (to Hapoel Beit She'an)
—	DF	ISR	El'ad Gabai (to Maccabi Haifa)
—	MF	ISR	Dan Einbinder (to Maccabi Tel Aviv)
—	MF	ISR	Sintayehu Sallalich (was on loan from Maccabi Haifa)
—	MF	USA	Bryan Gerzicich (to Hapoel Tel Aviv)
—	MF	ISR	Kenny Hasan Sayef (to Ironi Nir Ramat HaSharon)
—	MF	ISR	Adi Elisha (Free Agent)
—	MF	ISR	Amir Abels (on loan to Hapoel Bet She'an)
—	MF	ISR	Wahil Mresat (on loan to Hapoel Nazareth Illit)
—	FW	ISR	Hen Yad'an (on loan to Hapoel F.C. Karmiel/Safed)
—	FW	GHA	Osei Mauwli (to Hapoel Ashkelon)
—	FW	ARG	David Solari (to F.C. Ashdod)

=== Hapoel Nir Ramat HaSharon ===
In:

No.	Pos.	Nation	Player
—	GK	ISR	Itamar Nitzan (from Ironi Kiryat Shmona)
—	DF	ISR	Ori Shitrit (from Maccabi Netanya)
—	DF	BIH	Jadranko Bogičević (from (Bosnia and Herzegovina) Željezničar)
—	DF	ISR	Avi Strool (from Maccabi Tel Aviv)
—	MF	ISR	Ben Ben Yair (from Maccabi Tel Aviv)
—	MF	ISR	Michael Zandberg (from Hapoel Ramat Gan)
—	MF	ISR	Hasan Abu Zaid (on loan from Maccabi Tel Aviv)
—	MF	ISR	Kenny Hasan Sayef (from Hapoel Ironi Kiryat Shmona)
—	MF	ISR	Yossi Shivhon (from Maccabi Netanya)
—	MF	ISR	Yarden Sagiv (from Hapoel Kfar Saba)
—	FW	BIH	Emir Hadžić ( (Bosnia and Herzegovina) FK Sarajevo)
—	FW	ISR	Shlomi Mrad (from Hapoel Asi Gilboa)
—	FW	SRB	Aleksandar Djokovic (from (Serbia) FK Bezanija)

Out:

No.	Pos.	Nation	Player
—	GK	ISR	Ben Rahav (to Beitar Tel Aviv Ramla)
—	GK	ISR	Gal Nir (to Hapoel Ra'anana)
—	DF	ISR	Amir Nussbaum (to Hapoel Haifa)
—	DF	ISR	Daniel Borchal (to Beitar Kfar Saba)
—	DF	ISR	Yaniv Lavi (to Hapoel Ra'anana)
—	MF	ISR	Assi Baldout (to Hapoel Ra'anana)
—	MF	ISR	Moshe Abutbul (to Hapoel Ironi Kiryat Shmona)
—	MF	ISR	Or Ostvind (to Hapoel Haifa)
—	MF	SRB	Marko Anđelković (to (Lithuania) FK Ekranas)
—	MF	ISR	Oriyan Ya'akov (on loan to Hapoel Kfar Saba)
—	MF	ISR	Kassam Nagiar (on loan to Hapoel Daliyat al-Karmel)
—	FW	ARG	Adrián Fernández (to Hapoel Petah Tikva)
—	FW	ESP	Hugo López (to (Cyprus) Enosis Neon Paralimni)
—	FW	NGA	Udo Fortune (to (Indonesia) Persib Bandung)

=== F.C. Ashdod ===
In:

No.	Pos.	Nation	Player
—	DF	ISR	Idan Mikdash (was on loan to Hapoel Ashkelon)
—	DF	ISR	Amiran Shkalim (from Hapoel Petah Tikva)
—	MF	ISR	Guy Tzarfati (from Hapoel Haifa)
—	MF	SRB	Aleksandar Davidov (from (Serbia) Partizan, was on loan at Bnei Sakhnin)
—	MF	ARG	David Soalri (from Hapoel Ironi Kiryat Shmona)
—	MF	ISR	Roei Beckel (from (Cyprus) Alki Larnaca)
—	FW	NGA	Yero Bello (from Bnei Sakhnin)
—	FW	ISR	Timor Avitan (was on loan to Maccabi Yavne)

Out:

No.	Pos.	Nation	Player
—	DF	ISR	Idan Mikdash (on loan to Hakoah Amidar Ramat Gan)
—	MF	ISR	Nir Biton (to (Scotland) Celtic)
—	MF	ISR	Ben Butbul (to Hapoel Jerusalem)
—	MF	SVN	Sandi Arcon (to (Slovenia) Koper)
—	MF	ISR	David Revivo (to Beitar Jerusalem)
—	MF	ISR	Zion Tzemah (to Hakoah Amidar Ramat Gan)
—	FW	ISR	Izhak Nash (was on loan from Bnei Yehuda Tel Aviv)
—	FW	BUL	Dimitar Makriev ( (Bulgaria) Levski Sofia)

=== Hapoel Be'er Sheva ===
In:

No.	Pos.	Nation	Player
—	GK	ISR	Shlomi Ben Hemo (from Hapoel Kfar Saba)
—	DF	ISR	Ben Bitton (from Hapoel Nazareth Illit)
—	DF	ISR	Ben Turjeman (from Hapoel Nazareth Illit)
—	DF	SRB	Tomislav Pajović (from (Moldova) FC Sheriff Tiraspol)
—	MF	ISR	Kobi Dajani (from Maccabi Netanya)
—	MF	ISR	Maor Buzaglo (from (Belgium) Standard Liège)
—	FW	ISR	Elyaniv Barda (from (Belgium) Racing Genk)
—	FW	NED	Glynor Plet (from (Belgium) Racing Genk)

Out:

No.	Pos.	Nation	Player
—	GK	ISR	Eliran Sulimenpur (to Maccabi Be'er Ya'akov)
—	GK	ISR	Galil Ben Shanan (to Hapoel Ashkelon)
—	DF	ISR	Klemi Saban (to Hapoel Acre)
—	DF	ISR	Oded Gavish (to (Poland) Śląsk Wrocław)
—	DF	ISR	Ben Vehava (was on loan from Hapoel Ironi Kiryat Shmona)
—	DF	ISR	Gal Dahan (to Maccabi Be'er Sheva)
—	MF	ISR	Shimon Lugasi (to Maccabi Be'er Sheva)
—	MF	KEN	Patrick Osiako (to (Azerbaijan) Simurq PIK)
—	MF	ISR	Aviram Baruchyan (to Beitar Jerusalem)
—	MF	ISR	Roi Kahat (was on loan from Maccabi Tel Aviv)
—	FW	ISR	Ido Exbard (to Maccabi Netanya)

=== Hapoel Haifa ===
In:

No.	Pos.	Nation	Player
—	DF	ISR	Omri Kende (from (Romania) Astra Giurgiu)
—	DF	ISR	Amir Nussbaum (from Ironi Nir Ramat HaSharon)
—	DF	LTU	Tadas Kijanskas (from (Poland) Korona Kielce)
—	MF	SUR	Roei Shukrani (was on loan to Hapoel Nazareth Illit)
—	MF	SRB	Nebojša Marinković (from Hapoel Acre)
—	MF	ISR	Dela Yampolsky (from Maccabi Haifa)
—	MF	ISR	Or Ostvind (from Ironi Nir Ramat HaSharon)
—	MF	ARG	Darío Fernández (from Beitar Jerusalem)
—	FW	MNE	Žarko Korać (on loan from (Montenegro) Zeta)

Out:

No.	Pos.	Nation	Player
—	GK	ISR	Gad Amos (to Maccabi Ahi Nazareth)
—	DF	ISR	Adi Sheleg (to Hapoel Ra'anana)
—	DF	ISR	Eyal Tartazky (Retired)
—	DF	SRB	Dušan Brković ( (Hungary) Debrecen)
—	MF	ISR	Ran Abukarat (to Maccabi Haifa)
—	MF	ISR	Guy Tzarfati (to F.C. Ashdod)
—	MF	ISR	Gal Harel (to Hapoel Be'er Sheva)
—	FW	MNE	Vladimir Gluščević (Free Agent)
—	FW	MNE	Stefan Denković (to (Serbia) Vojvodina)
—	FW	ISR	Shahar Hirsh (on loan to Hapoel Afula)

=== Beitar Jerusalem ===
In:

No.	Pos.	Nation	Player
—	DF	VEN	Andrés Túñez (on loan from (Spain) Celta)
—	DF	ISR	Netanel Ben Simon (was on loan to Maccabi Ahi Nazareth)
—	DF	ISR	Tomer Yerucham (was on loan to Hapoel Rishon LeZion)
—	DF	ISR	Nisso Kapiloto (from (Cyprus) Alki Larnaca)
—	DF	COD	Landry Mulemo (from (Belgium) Kortrijk)
—	DF	ISR	Dor Malul (from (Belgium) Beerschot)
—	MF	ISR	David Revivo (from F.C. Ashdod)
—	MF	ISR	Omer Atzily (from Hapoel Rishon LeZion)
—	MF	ISR	Roei Zikri (from Hapoel Petah Tikva)
—	MF	ISR	Aviram Baruchyan (from Hapoel Be'er Sheva)
—	MF	NGA	Osa Guobadia (from (North Macedonia) FK Vardar)
—	MF	ISR	Sintayehu Sallalich (on loan from Maccabi Haifa)
—	FW	ISR	Itzik Cohen (from Hapoel Jerusalem)
—	FW	BRA	Bryan Jones Anicézio (from (Brazil) Tupi)
—	FW	SLE	Teteh Bangura (on loan from (Turkey) Bursaspor)

Out:

No.	Pos.	Nation	Player
—	DF	CRO	Dino Škvorc (to (Cyprus) Nea Salamis)
—	DF	RUS	Dzhabrail Kadiyev (to (Russia) Terek Grozny)
—	MF	ISR	Avi Reikan (to (Switzerland) FC Zürich)
—	MF	CRO	Dominik Glavina (to (Croatia) Slaven Belupo)
—	MF	ISR	Kobi Moyal (to (Moldova) Sheriff)
—	FW	ISR	Omer Nachmani (on loan to Maccabi Herzliya)
—	FW	RUS	Zaur Sadayev (to (Russia) Terek Grozny)
—	FW	ISR	Eran Levy (to Maccabi Netanya)
—	FW	ISR	Amit Ben Shushan (to (Cyprus) Antorthosis)
—	FW	ISR	Harel Polak (on loan to Beitar Nahariya)
—	FW	ISR	Tal Mishali (on loan to Maccabi Umm al-Fahm)

=== Hapoel Acre ===
In:

No.	Pos.	Nation	Player
—	DF	ISR	Naor Dahan (was on loan to Hapoel Assi Gilboa)
—	DF	ISR	Klemi Saban (from Hapoel Be'er Sheva)
—	DF	ISR	Eliran Danin (from Hapoel Tel Aviv)
—	MF	ISR	Shadi Shaban (from Hapoel Bnei Lod)
—	MF	BRA	Juliano Spadacio (from (Cyprus) Anorthosis)
—	MF	ISR	Nenad Marinković (from Bnei Yehuda Tel Aviv)
—	MF	CRO	Mirko Oremuš (from (Croatia) Hajduk Split)
—	MF	ISR	Eden Batit (from Hakoah Amidar Ramat Gan)
—	FW	ISR	Roi Atar (on loan from Maccabi Haifa)
—	FW	BRA	Leandrão (from (Brazil) Rio Branco)
—	FW	ISR	Elior Seiderre (was on loan to Hapoel Afula)
—	FW	ISR	Eli Zizov (from Maccabi Tel Aviv)

Out:

No.	Pos.	Nation	Player
—	DF	ISR	Roi Levi (to Hapoel Rishon LeZion)
—	DF	ISR	Dedi Ben-Dayan (to Bnei Sakhnin)
—	MF	ISR	Tamir Kahlon (was on loan from Maccabi Tel Aviv)
—	FW	BRA	David Gomez (to Hapoel Petah Tikva)
—	FW	ISR	Ohad Kadusi (to (Switzerland) FC Lausanne-Sport)

=== Bnei Sakhnin ===
In:

No.	Pos.	Nation	Player
—	DF	ESP	Abraham Paz (from (Spain) Sabadell)
—	DF	ISR	Mor Shushan (from Hapoel Tel Aviv)
—	DF	ISR	Dedi Ben-Dayan (from Hapoel Acre)
—	DF	ISR	Amir Nasar A Din (on loan from Maccabi Haifa)
—	MF	NGA	Stephen Sunday (from (Spain) Numancia)
—	MF	ISR	Firas Mugrabi (from (France) Lens)
—	MF	ISR	Ravid Gazal (from Hapoel Be'er Sheva)
—	MF	ESP	Cristian Hidalgo (from (Bulgaria) Cherno More)
—	FW	ISR	Mohammad Ghadir (on loan from Maccabi Haifa)
—	FW	ISR	Ahmed Nahia (from Maccabi Umm al-Fahm)
—	FW	SRB	Marko Markovski (from (Moldova) Sheriff Tiraspol)

Out:

No.	Pos.	Nation	Player
—	DF	GHA	Imoro Lukman (to Hapoel Petah Tikva)
—	DF	ISR	Akram Shariach (to Hapoel Bnei Lod)
—	DF	BEL	Pierre Mbemba (to (Cyprus) Omonia)
—	DF	ISR	Adir Tubul (to Maccabi Netanya)
—	MF	ISR	Idan Weitzman ( (Azerbaijan) Simurq PIK)
—	MF	ISR	Dia Saba (to Maccabi Petah Tikva)
—	MF	SRB	Aleksandar Davidov (to F.C. Ashdod)
—	MF	ISR	Mahmoud Abbas (to Hapoel Bnei Lod)
—	FW	TOG	Arafat Djako (Free Agent)
—	FW	ISR	Yero Bello (to F.C. Ashdod)
—	FW	ISR	Hasiv Abu Rukon (to Hapoel Afula)

=== Maccabi Petah Tikva ===
In:

No.	Pos.	Nation	Player
—	GK	ISR	Zahi Gigi (from Maccabi Sha'arayim)
—	DF	ISR	Yuval Jakobovich (from Hapoel Kfar Saba)
—	DF	CRO	Ivan Herceg (from (Croatia) Inter Zaprešić)
—	DF	SVN	Bojan Đukić (from (Slovenia) FC Koper)
—	DF	ISR	Shmulik Malul (from Beitar Nes Tubruk)
—	MF	ISR	Dia Saba (from Bnei Sakhnin)
—	MF	CIV	Zito (from (France) Le Mans)
—	MF	ARG	Pedro Galván (from Bnei Yehuda Tel Aviv)
—	MF	NGA	Emmanuel Ogude (Unknown)
—	MF	ISR	Alroey Cohen (from Hapoel Tel Aviv)
—	FW	ISR	Guy Melamed (from Hapoel Kfar Saba)
—	FW	ISR	Roei Dayan (from (Belgium) Beerschot)

Out:

No.	Pos.	Nation	Player
—	GK	ISR	Omri Alon (to Maccabi Ahi Nazareth)
—	DF	ISR	Itay Ozeri (to Beitar Tel Aviv Ramla)
—	DF	RUS	Murad Magomedov (Retired)
—	MF	ISR	Dori Alberman (on loan to Hapoel Kartamon Jerusalem)
—	FW	ISR	Idan Shriki (was on loan from Maccabi Netanya)
—	FW	ISR	Dror Dego (on loan to Hapoel Mahane Yehuda)

=== Hapoel Ra'anana ===
In:

No.	Pos.	Nation	Player
—	GK	ISR	Gal Nir (from Ironi Nir Ramat HaSharon)
—	GK	ISR	Arik Yanko (from Hapoel Tel Aviv)
—	DF	ISR	Guy Lifka (from Maccabi Haifa)
—	DF	ISR	Yaniv Lavi (from Ironi Nir Ramat HaSharon)
—	DF	ISR	Adi Sheleg (from Hapel Haifa)
—	DF	ZAM	Emmanuel Mbola (from (Democratic Republic of the Congo) TP Mazembe)
—	MF	ISR	Assaf Madar (on loan from Maccabi Tel Aviv)
—	MF	ISR	Ben Binyamin (on loan from Maccabi Netanya)
—	MF	ISR	Assi Baldout (from Ironi Nir Ramat HaSharon)
—	MF	ISR	Tamir Cohen (from Maccabi Haifa)
—	MF	ISR	Sa'ar Benbenishti (from Hapoel Bnei Lod)
—	FW	BRA	Eudis ( (Switzerland) Servette)
—	FW	NGA	Anthony Nwakaeme ( (Romania) Universitatea Cluj)

Out:

No.	Pos.	Nation	Player
—	GK	ISR	Ohad Cohen (to Hapoel Kfar Saba)
—	GK	ISR	Gal Mesika (Free Agent)
—	DF	ISR	Ahmed Sha'aban (was on loan from Maccabi Haifa)
—	DF	ISR	Ben Koaz (to Hapoel Kfar Saba)
—	MF	ISR	Adi Elisha (was on loan from Hapoel Ironi Kiryat Shmona)
—	MF	ISR	Mohammed Pudi (to Hapoel Bnei Lod)
—	MF	ISR	Kobi Hassan (to Maccabi Netanya)
—	FW	ISR	Dan Robinson (on loan to Hapoel Herzliya)
—	FW	ISR	Yossi Asayag (to Hapoel Ramat Gan)

== Liga Leumit ==
=== Maccabi Netanya ===
In:

No.	Pos.	Nation	Player
—	GK	ISR	Ohad Levita (from (Cyprus) AC Omonia)
—	GK	ISR	Snir Dori (from Hapoel Petah Tikva)
—	DF	SUR	Touvarno Pinas (was on loan to Hapoel Haifa)
—	DF	ISR	Adir Tubul (from Bnei Sakhnin)
—	DF	COD	Savity Lipenia (from Ironi Nir Ramat HaSharon)
—	MF	ISR	Kobi Hassan (from Hapoel Ra'anana)
—	MF	ISR	Shalev Menashe (from Bnei Yehuda)
—	MF	ISR	Adi Soffer (from Hapoel Ashkelon)
—	MF	ISR	Lior Jan (from Hapoel Petah Tikva)
—	FW	ISR	Idan Shriki (was on loan to Maccabi Petah Tikva)
—	FW	ISR	Eran Levy (from Beitar Jerusalem)
—	FW	ISR	Ido Exbard (from Hapoel Be'er Sheva)
—	FW	ISR	Ran Rol (from Hapoel Nazareth Illit)
—	FW	NGA	Olarenwaju Kayode (on loan from (Ivory Coast) ASEC Mimosas)
—	FW	ISR	Nir Abergil (from Ironi Tiberias)

Out:

No.	Pos.	Nation	Player
—	GK	GRE	Luigi Cennamo (to (Greece) Atromitos)
—	DF	ISR	Omri Ben Harush (to Maccabi Tel Aviv)
—	DF	ISR	Ori Shitrit (to Ironi Nir Ramat HaSharon)
—	MF	ISR	Ben Binyamin (to Hapoel Ra'anana)
—	MF	ISR	Kobi Dajani (to Hapoel Be'er Sheva)
—	MF	SRB	Dragan Ćeran (to (Azerbaijan) Simurq)
—	MF	PLE	Ali El-Khatib (to Maccabi Ahi Nazareth)
—	MF	ISR	Yossi Shivhon (to Ironi Nir Ramat HaSharon)
—	MF	ISR	Yarden Cohen (was on loan from Hapoel Nazareth Illit)
—	FW	ISR	Mohamed Akel (on loan to Maccabi Daliyat al-Karmel)
—	FW	ISR	Achmad Saba'a (to Ironi Kiryat Shmona)
—	FW	COD	Serge Lofo Bongeli (Free agent)

=== Hapoel Ramat Gan ===
In:

No.	Pos.	Nation	Player
—	GK	ISR	Ram Strauss (on loan from Maccabi Haifa)
—	DF	ISR	Avi Soffer (from Hapoel Kfar Saba)
—	DF	GHA	Daniel Addo (from Hapoel Petah Tikva)
—	DF	ISR	Dor Malichi (from Hapoel Kfar Saba)
—	MF	ISR	Yaniv Luzon (from Hapoel Petah Tikva)
—	MF	ISR	Almog Buzaglo (from Maccabi Jaffa)
—	MF	ISR	Dan Roman (from Beitar Tel Aviv Ramla)
—	MF	CIV	Kpéhi Brossou (Unknown)
—	MF	CIV	Issoumaila Lingane (from SOC)
—	MF	ISR	Lidor Cohen (from Hapoel Kfar Saba)
—	MF	ISR	Liad Berkovich (from Maccabi Jaffa)
—	FW	ISR	Liron Diamant (from Maccabi Herzliya)
—	FW	ISR	Yossi Asaysg (from Hapoel Ra'anana)
—	FW	ISR	Avi'el Gabay (from Ironi Tiberias)

Out:

No.	Pos.	Nation	Player
—	GK	ISR	Guy Solomon (Free agent)
—	GK	ISR	Itay Arkin (to Maccabi Hezliya)
—	DF	ISR	Oz Ifrah (to Hapoel Ashkelon)
—	DF	FRA	Bernard Onanga Itoua (to (Germany) SV Elversberg)
—	DF	ISR	Tal Hen (to Hapoel Bnei Lod)
—	DF	ISR	Ze'ev Haimovich (was on loan from Hapoel Tel Aviv)
—	DF	ISR	Yogev Ben Simon (to Hapoel Petah Tikva)
—	MF	ISR	Artur Atzianov (was on loan from Hapoel Tel Aviv)
—	MF	ISR	Ben Ben Yair (was on loan from Maccabi Tel Aviv)
—	MF	ISR	Vladimir Brown (to Ironi Kiryat Shmona)
—	MF	MLI	Djibril Sidibé (to Hapoel Ashkelon)
—	MF	ISR	Yisrael Zaguri (to Hapoel Tel Aviv)
—	MF	ISR	Offir Hemo (to Hapoel Ashkelon)
—	MF	ISR	Michael Zandberg (to Ironi Nir Ramat HaSharon)
—	FW	ARG	Carlos Chacana (to Hapoel Ashkelon)
—	FW	ROU	Dorin Goga (to (Georgia (country)) Dinamo Tbilisi)
—	FW	CTA	David Manga (to Ironi Kiryat Shmona)
—	FW	SVN	Miran Burgič (Free agent)
—	FW	ISR	Ran Itzhak (to Hapoel Tel Aviv)

=== Hapoel Nazareth Illit ===
In:

No.	Pos.	Nation	Player
—	GK	ISR	Itamar Israeli (from Hapoel Herzliya)
—	DF	ISR	Ahmed Sha'aban (on loan from Maccabi Haifa)
—	MF	ISR	Medan Steinberg (was on loan to Ironi Tiberias)
—	MF	ISR	Luhab Kayal (from Hapoel Acre)
—	MF	ISR	Yarden Cohen (was on loan to Maccabi Netanya)
—	MF	ISR	Eran Rozenbaum (on loan from Maccabi Haifa)
—	MF	ISR	Yaniv Levi (from Beitar Tel Aviv Ramla)
—	MF	ISR	Wahel Maresat (on loan from Ironi Kiryat Shmona)
—	MF	ISR	Ahmed Diab (was on loan to Maccabi Umm al-Fahm)
—	FW	USA	Noah Sadaoui (on loan from Maccabi Haifa)

Out:

No.	Pos.	Nation	Player
—	DF	ISR	Ben Bitton (to Hapoel Be'er Sheva)
—	DF	ISR	Ben Turjeman (to Hapoel Be'er Sheva)
—	MF	ISR	Roei Shukrani (was on loan from Hapoel Haifa)
—	MF	ISR	Lior Linder (to Ironi Tiberias)
—	MF	ISR	Moti Malka (to Hapoel Rishon LeZion)
—	MF	ISR	Yaniv Deri (on loan to Hapoel Beit She'an)
—	FW	ISR	Ran Rol (to Maccabi Netanya)
—	FW	MDA	Eugen Sidorenco (to (Russia) Tom Tomsk)

=== Hapoel Jerusalem ===
In:

No.	Pos.	Nation	Player
—	GK	ISR	Aviram Ziat (on loan from Bietar Jerusalem)
—	DF	ISR	Osher Abu (on loan from Maccabi Tel Aviv)
—	DF	ISR	Yonatan Zada (from Hapoel Ortodoxim Lod)
—	DF	ISR	Rotem Bouskila (on loan from Maccabi Tel Aviv)
—	DF	ISR	Matan Ben Naim (on loan from Hapoel Rishon LeZion)
—	MF	ISR	Idan Sade (from Hapoel Kfar Saba)
—	MF	ISR	Ben Butbul (from F.C. Ashdod)
—	FW	ISR	Alon Buzorgi (from Hapoel Assi Gilboa)
—	FW	ISR	Hen Mantzuri (was on loan to Hapoel Katamon Jerusalem)

Out:

No.	Pos.	Nation	Player
—	GK	ISR	Rafi Cohen (Retired)
—	MF	ISR	Adir Elkaslasi (on loan to Beitar Giv'at Ze'ev)
—	MF	ISR	Efi Malka (to Hapoel Bnei Lod)
—	FW	ISR	Itzik Cohen (to Beitar Jerusalem)
—	FW	ISR	Eden Nachmani (was on loan from Beitar Jerusalem)
—	FW	ISR	Adam Mizrahi (on loan to Beitar Giv'at Ze'ev)

=== Hapoel Petah Tikva ===
In:

No.	Pos.	Nation	Player
—	GK	ISR	Avi Ivgi (from Maccabi Herzliya)
—	DF	GHA	Imoro Lukman (from Bnei Sakhnin)
—	DF	ISR	Yogev Ben Simon (from Hapoel Ramat Gan)
—	DF	ISR	Uri Peso (from (Cyprus) Ayia Napa)
—	DF	ISR	Ben Zahiri (on loan from Bnei Yehuda Tel Aviv)
—	MF	ISR	Tal Me'ir (from Hapoel Bnei Lod)
—	MF	ISR	Shay Revivo (from Maccabi Herzliya)
—	MF	ISR	Itay Elkaslasy (from Hapoel Rishon LeZion)
—	FW	ISR	Lior Asulin (from Hapoel Rishon LeZion)

Out:

No.	Pos.	Nation	Player
—	GK	ISR	Snir Dori (to Maccabi Netanya)
—	DF	ISR	Amiran Shkalim (to F.C. Ashdod)
—	MF	ISR	Sean Malka (was on loan from Hapoel Tel Aviv)
—	MF	ISR	Yaniv Luzon (to Hapoel Ramat Gan)
—	MF	ISR	Lior Jan (to Maccabi Netanya)
—	MF	ISR	Maor Halabi (to Maccabi Be'er Ya'akov)
—	FW	ISR	Roei Zikri (to Beitar Jerusalem)
—	FW	ISR	Ohad Edelstein (on loan to Hapoel Katamon Jerusalem)

=== Hapoel Rishon LeZion ===
In:

No.	Pos.	Nation	Player
—	DF	ISR	Roi Levi (from Hapoel Acre)
—	MF	ISR	Shlomi Yosef Azulay (from Hapoel Haifa)
—	MF	ISR	Or Giro (from hakoah Amidar Ramat Gan)
—	MF	ISR	El'ad Halimi (was on loan to Hapoel Azor)
—	MF	ISR	Moti Malka (from Hapoel Nazareth Illit)
—	FW	ISR	Eden Shrem (on loan from Hapoel Tel Aviv)
—	FW	ISR	Nir Nachum (from Hapoel Tel Aviv)

Out:

No.	Pos.	Nation	Player
—	DF	ISR	Tomer Yerucham (was on loan from Beitar Jerusalem)
—	DF	ISR	Matan Ben Naim (to Hapoel Jerusalem)
—	DF	ISR	Eliran Simon (to Hapoel Kfar Saba)
—	MF	ISR	Itay Elakslasy (to Hapoel Petah Tikva)
—	MF	ISR	Baruch Dego (to Hapoel Ashkelon)
—	MF	ISR	Omer Atzili (to Beitar Jerusalem)
—	FW	ISR	Lior Asulin (to Hapoel Petah Tikva)

=== Maccabi Herzliya ===
In:

No.	Pos.	Nation	Player
—	GK	ISR	Itay Arkin (from Hapoel Ramat Gan)
—	DF	ISR	Dean Akafi (on loan from Maccabi Tel Aviv)
—	MF	ISR	Shay David (from Hapoel Kfar Saba)
—	MF	ISR	Omer Rafas (from Hakoah Amidar Ramat Gan)
—	FW	ISR	Rafi Amos (from Beitar Tel Aviv Ramla)
—	FW	ISR	Omer Nachmani (on loan from Beitar Jerusalem)
—	FW	ISR	Yadin Zaris (on loan from (Belgium) Standard Liège)

Out:

No.	Pos.	Nation	Player
—	GK	ISR	Avi Ivgi (to Hapoel Petah Tikva)
—	DF	ISR	Beni Hadad (Free agent)
—	DF	ISR	Adir Menashe (Free agent)
—	MF	ISR	Shay Revivo (to Hapoel Petah Tikva)
—	MF	ISR	Tal Me'ir (to Hapoel Petah Tikva)
—	FW	ISR	Liron Diamant (to Hapoel Ramat Gan)
—	FW	ISR	Inon Barda (to Maccabi Kiryat Gat)
—	FW	ISR	Aviv Azaria (Free agent)

=== Hapoel Bnei Lod ===
In:

No.	Pos.	Nation	Player
—	DF	ISR	Tal Hen (from Hapoel Ramat Gan)
—	DF	ISR	Akram Shariach (from Bnei Sakhnin)
—	DF	ISR	Oded Amitay (from Beitar Tel Aviv Ramla)
—	DF	GUI	Idrissa Souma (from Hapoel Rishon LeZion)
—	MF	ISR	Efi Malka (from Hapoel Jerusalem)
—	MF	ISR	Mohammed Pudi (from Hapoel Ra'anana)
—	FW	ISR	Murad Abu Anza (was on loan to F.C. Ashdod)
—	FW	ISR	Moshe Ben Lulu (from Hakoah Amidar Ramat Gan)

Out:

No.	Pos.	Nation	Player
—	DF	ISR	Yakir Shina (to Beitar Tel Aviv Ramla)
—	MF	ISR	Shadi Sha'aban (on loan to Hapoel Acre)
—	MF	ISR	Sa'ar Benbenishti (to Hapoel Ra'anana)
—	MF	ISR	Reef Mesika (to Hapoel Tel Aviv)
—	MF	ISR	Tal Me'ir (to Hapoel Petah Tikva)
—	FW	ISR	Anton Arkhipov (to (Russia) Rotor)
—	FW	ISR	Nevo Mizrahi (to Maccabi Yavne)

=== Maccabi Yavne ===
In:

No.	Pos.	Nation	Player
—	DF	ISR	Nadav Muniss (on loan from Bnei Yehuda Tel Aviv)
—	DF	ISR	Din Itzhak (from Maccabi Ironi Bat Yam)
—	DF	ISR	Rahamim Checkol (was Free Agent)
—	MF	ISR	Ya'akov Mor (from Hapoel Rishon LeZion)
—	MF	ISR	Roi Kahat (on loan from Maccabi Tel Aviv)
—	MF	ISR	Didi Unger (from Hapoel Kfar Saba)
—	MF	ISR	Bar Leiva (from Hapoel Marmorek)
—	FW	ISR	Nevo Mizrahi (from Hapoel Bnei Lod)

Out:

No.	Pos.	Nation	Player
—	DF	ISR	Eliran George (to Hapoel Katamon Jerusalem)
—	DF	ISR	Idan Zion (to Maccabi Kiryat Gat)
—	DF	ISR	Mishel Nahmias (to Maccabi Ironi Bat Yam)
—	MF	ISR	Arnon Tamir (to Maccabi Kiryat Gat)
—	MF	ISR	Eden Batit (to Hapoel Acre)
—	MF	ISR	Asaf Ben Muha (to Maccabi Daliyat al-Karmel)
—	MF	ISR	Dudu Avraham (Free agent)
—	FW	ISR	Timor Avitan (was on loan F.C. Ashdod)
—	FW	ISR	Yarden Abuhatzira (to Hapoel Ashkelon)
—	FW	ISR	Oren Nissim (to Hapoel Kfar Saba)

=== Maccabi Ahi Nazareth ===
In:

No.	Pos.	Nation	Player
—	GK	ISR	Gad Amos (from Hapoel Haifa)
—	GK	ISR	Omri Alon (from Maccabi Petah Tikva)
—	DF	ISR	Emri Zaid (on loan from Maccabi Haifa)
—	MF	ISR	Jonathan Assous (from Hapoel Ashkelon)
—	FW	PLE	Ali El-Khatib (from Maccabi Netanya)
—	FW	ISR	Amir Abu Nil (on loan from Hapoel Haifa)

Out:

No.	Pos.	Nation	Player
—	GK	ISR	Ram Strauss (was on loan from Maccabi Haifa)
—	GK	ISR	Tarek Natur (to Maccabi Ironi Kiryat Ata)
—	DF	ISR	Netanel Ben Simon (was on loan from Beitar Jerusalem)
—	DF	ISR	Dean Maimoni (was on loan from Ironi Kiryat Shmona)
—	MF	PLE	Hilal Musa (to Hapoel Rishon LeZion)
—	FW	ISR	Maor Ida (to Maccabi Umm al-Fahm)

=== Hakoah Amidar Ramat Gan ===
In:

No.	Pos.	Nation	Player
—	GK	ISR	Daniel Lifshitz (from Hapoel Ashkelon)
—	DF	ISR	Idan Mikdash (from F.C. Ashdod)
—	DF	ISR	Lior Bargig (on loan from Bnei Yehuda Tel Aviv)
—	DF	ISR	Hana Nasser (from Maccabi Umm al-Fahm)
—	MF	ISR	Zion Tzemah (from F.C. Ashdod)
—	MF	ISR	Mohammed Darweesh (from Hapoel Ashkelon)
—	MF	ISR	Iman Harbat (from Maccabi Umm al-Fahm)
—	FW	ISR	Amar Zidan (from Maccabi Haifa)
—	FW	NGA	Lary Kahinda (n loan from Maccabi Tel Aviv)
—	FW	ISR	Itzhak Nash (from Bnei Yehuda Tel Aviv)
—	FW	ISR	Ben Azubel (from Hapoel Kfar Saba)

Out:

No.	Pos.	Nation	Player
—	GK	ISR	Arik Yanko (was on loan from Hapoel Tel Aviv)
—	GK	ISR	Dean Azulay (Free agent)
—	DF	ISR	Uri Magabo (to Hapoel Ashkelon)
—	DF	ISR	Matan Ben Naim (to Hapoel Jerusalem)
—	DF	ISR	Haim Malka (to Hapoel Ashkelon)
—	DF	ISR	Adi Tamir (was on loan from F.C. Ashdod)
—	MF	ISR	Amir Lavi (Free agent)
—	MF	NGA	Chimezie Mbah (to (Belgium) Waasland-Beveren)
—	MF	ISR	Maor Lankri (to Maccabi Be'er Ya'akov)
—	FW	ISR	Moshe Ben Lulu (to Hapoel Bnei Lod)
—	FW	ISR	Niv Ben David (to F.C. Giv'at Olga)
—	FW	ISR	Shlomi Levy (to Hapoel Kfar Shalem)

=== Maccabi Umm al-Fahm ===
In:

No.	Pos.	Nation	Player
—	DF	ISR	Yehuda Hota (from Sektzia Nes Tziona)
—	DF	ISR	Leonard Krupnik (from Hapoel Petah Tikva)
—	MF	ISR	Tal Shmaya (from Sektzia Nes Tziona)
—	MF	ISR	Dudu Ben Shushan (from Hapoel Afula)
—	MF	ISR	Sharon Gormazno (from Maccabi Yavne)
—	FW	ISR	Maor Ida (rom Maccabi Ahi Nazareth)
—	FW	ISR	Shlomi Avisidris (from Hapoel Assi Gilboa)

Out:

No.	Pos.	Nation	Player
—	DF	ISR	Hana Nasser (to Hakoah Amidar Ramat Gan)
—	DF	ISR	Abed Morjan (to Hapoel Katamon Jerusalem)
—	DF	ISR	Dor Halevi (to Hapoel Katamon Jerusalem)
—	MF	ISR	Iman Harabat (to Hakoah Amidar Ramat Gan)
—	MF	GEO	Girogi Gabbiaduri (to Hapoel Bnei Lod)
—	MF	ISR	Ahmed Diab (to Hapoel Nazareth Illit)
—	FW	ISR	Ahmed Nahia (to Bnei Sakhnin)

=== Hapoel Ashkelon ===
In:

No.	Pos.	Nation	Player
—	GK	ISR	Galil Ben Shanan (from Hapoel Be'er Sheva)
—	DF	ISR	Haim Malka (from Hakoah Amidar Ramat Gan)
—	DF	ISR	Uri Magabo (from Hakoah Amidar Ramat Gan)
—	DF	ISR	Oz Ifrah (from Hapoel Ramat Gan)
—	DF	ISR	Ilan Rankevic (from Hapoel Haifa)
—	MF	ISR	Offir Hemo (from Hapoel Ramat Gan)
—	MF	MLI	Djibril Sidibé (from Hapoel Ramat Gan)
—	MF	ISR	Baruch Dego (from Hapoel Rishon LeZion)
—	MF	ISR	Zah Zelinger (from Ironi Kiryat Malachi)
—	FW	ISR	Yarden Abuhatzira (from Maccabi Yavne)
—	FW	GHA	Oswei Mawuli (from Ironi Kiryat Shmona)
—	FW	ARG	Carlos Chacana (from Hapoel Ramat Gan)

Out:

No.	Pos.	Nation	Player
—	GK	ISR	Daniel Lifshitz (to Hakoah Amidar Ramat Gan)
—	DF	ISR	Nissan Elkalay (to Beitar Tubruk)
—	DF	ISR	Shay Mutai (to Beitar Tubruk)
—	DF	ISR	Idan Mikdash (was on loan from F.C. Ashdod)
—	DF	ISR	Tal Machluf (to Ironi Tiberias)
—	MF	ISR	Dudi Elisha (Free Agent)
—	MF	ISR	Adi Soffer (to Maccabi Netanya)
—	MF	NGA	Harmony Ikande (to (Ukraine) Hoverla Uzhhorod)
—	MF	ISR	Jonathan Assous (to Maccabi Ahi Nazareth)
—	MF	ISR	Moshe Asulin (on loan to F.C. Dimona)
—	MF	CMR	Emmanuel Emangoa (Free Agent)
—	MF	ISR	Mohammed Darwish (to Hakoah Amidar Ramat Gan)
—	MF	ISR	Messay Dego (to Hapoel Katamon Jerusalem)
—	FW	GHA	Dominik Wassi (Free Agent)

=== Beitar Tel Aviv Ramla ===
In:

No.	Pos.	Nation	Player
—	GK	ISR	Ben Rahav (from Ironi Nir Ramat HaSharon)
—	GK	ISR	Jenia Donayeev (from Hapoel Assi Gilboa)
—	DF	ISR	Carlos Luiza (from Hapoel Herzliya)
—	DF	ISR	Yakir Shina (from Hapoel Bnei Lod)
—	DF	ISR	Itay Ozeri (from Maccabi Petah Tivka)
—	DF	ISR	Roi Shir (from Hapoel Ortodoksim Lod)
—	MF	ISR	Gil Gikarov (from Hapoel Herzliya)
—	MF	ISR	Or Eliyahu (from Beitar Nes Tubruk)
—	MF	GHA	William Owusu (from Hapoel Kfar Saba)
—	MF	ISR	Sharon Ziso (from Maccabi Tel Aviv)
—	MF	ISR	Majed Youness (from Hapoel Marmorek)
—	FW	CMR	Louis Zome (Free agent)

Out:

No.	Pos.	Nation	Player
—	DF	ISR	Hen Dilmoni (to Ironi Kiryat Shmona)
—	DF	ISR	Oded Amitay (to Hapoel Bnei Lod)
—	MF	ISR	Dudu Ben Shushan (to Maccabi Umm al-Fahm)
—	MF	ISR	Dan Roman (to Hapoel Ramat Gan)
—	FW	ISR	Vitaly Ganon (to Maccabi Ironi Bat Yam)
—	FW	ISR	Omer Rafas (to Maccabi Herzliya)
—	FW	ISR	Elnatan Salami (to Hapoel Afula)

=== Hapoel Afula ===
In:

No.	Pos.	Nation	Player
—	GK	ISR	Meir Cohen (from Hapoel Nazareth Illit)
—	DF	LBR	Gizzi Durbour (from Hapoel Kfar Saba)
—	DF	MDA	Igor Andronic (from (Moldova) Zimbru)
—	DF	ISR	Gal Sapir (from (Netherlands) Telstar)
—	MF	ISR	Yuval Shawat (from Hapoel Acre)
—	MF	ROU	Adrian Grigoruta (from (Kazakhstan) FC Okzhetpes)
—	MF	ISR	Dor Kochav (on loan from Maccabi Haifa)
—	FW	ISR	Shahar Hirsh (on loan from Hapoel Haifa)
—	FW	ISR	Elnatan Salami (from Beitar Tel Aviv Ramla)
—	FW	ISR	Hasiv Abu Rukon (from Bnei Sakhnin)

Out:

No.	Pos.	Nation	Player
—	GK	ISR	Ido Levy (to Hapoel Herzliya)
—	DF	ISR	Eran Sasportas (to Maccabi Daliyat al-Karmel)
—	DF	ISR	Teres Shulkowski (to Hapoel Migdal Ha'emek)
—	MF	ISR	Omer Mula'i (to Maccabi Kiryat Gat)
—	MF	ISR	Ben Ben Shushan (to Hapoel Kfar Saba)
—	FW	ISR	Sagi Pizchadze (to Maccabi Tzur Shalom)
—	FW	ISR	Idan David (to Maccabi Daliyat al-Karmel)
—	FW	ISR	Elior Seiderre (was on loan from Hapoel Acre)

=== Hapoel Katamon Jerusalem ===
In:

No.	Pos.	Nation	Player
—	GK	ISR	Adir Boitor (from Hapoel Marmorek)
—	DF	ISR	Abed Morjan (from Maccabi Umm al-Fahm)
—	DF	ISR	Uri Cohen (from Sektzia Nes Tziona)
—	DF	ISR	Eliran George (from Maccabi Yavne)
—	DF	ISR	Shay Mazor (on loan from Beitar Jerusalem)
—	DF	ISR	Dor Halevi (from Maccabi Umm al-Fahm)
—	MF	ISR	Dori Alberman (on loan from Maccabi Petah Tikva)
—	MF	ISR	Messay Dego (from Hapoel Ashkelon)
—	FW	ISR	Omri Ron (from Sektzia Nes Tziona)
—	FW	ISR	Raz Stain (on loan from Maccabi Haifa)
—	FW	ISR	Ohad Edelstein (on loan from Hapoel Petah Tikva)

Out:

No.	Pos.	Nation	Player
—	DF	ISR	Nissim Azarzar (to Ironi Modi'in)
—	MF	ISR	Samir Abed-Alhi (to Hapoel Kfar Saba)
—	MF	ISR	Dor Grosbach (to Maccabi Amishav Petah Tikva)
—	MF	ISR	Shalom Akiva (to Ironi Tiberias)
—	FW	ISR	Hen Mantzuri (was on loan from Hapoel Jerusalem)
