= 2013–14 Maccabi Tel Aviv F.C. season =

Maccabi Tel Aviv
2013-14 season
- Chairman: Mitchell Goldhar
- Stadium: Bloomfield Stadium, Tel Aviv
- Premier League: 1st
- State Cup: Round of 32
- Europa League: Round of 32

Maccabi Tel Aviv are an Israeli football club which are based in Tel Aviv. During the 2013–14 campaign the club have competed in the Israeli Premier League, State Cup, UEFA Champions League and UEFA Europa League.

== Squad ==
As of 12 March 2014

=== First Team ===
Note: Flags indicate national team as defined under FIFA eligibility rules; some limited exceptions apply. Players may hold more than one non-FIFA nationality.

No.	Pos.	Nation	Player
1	GK	ISR	Barak Levi
2	DF	ISR	Yuval Spungin
6	MF	ISR	Gal Alberman (1st VC)
7	MF	ISR	Eran Zahavi
9	MF	ISR	Maharan Radi
10	FW	ISR	Barak Yitzhaki
11	FW	ISR	Tal Ben Haim
14	DF	ISR	Yoav Ziv
15	MF	ISR	Dor Micha
16	MF	ISR	Ben Reichert
17	MF	ISR	Dan Einbinder
18	DF	ISR	Eitan Tibi

No.	Pos.	Nation	Player
20	DF	ISR	Omri Ben Harush
21	DF	ISR	Sheran Yeini (Captain)
22	FW	SWE	Rade Prica
23	FW	ISR	Barak Badash
24	MF	SRB	Nikola Mitrović
25	GK	ESP	Juan Pablo
26	DF	FRA	Rémi Maréval
27	FW	ISR	Dor Jan
29	MF	ISR	Omri Altman (on loan from Fulham)
30	FW	ISR	Gael Margulies
31	DF	ESP	Carlos García

== Transfers ==
=== Summer 2013 ===
In:

No.	Pos.	Nation	Player
—	GK	ESP	Juan Pablo Colinas (from (Spain) Sporting Gijón)
—	GK	ISR	Guy Haimov (was on loan to (Cyprus) AEK Larnaca)
—	DF	ISR	Omri Ben Harush (from Maccabi Netanya)
—	DF	ESP	Mané (from (Spain) Getafe)
—	MF	SRB	Nikola Mitrović (from (Hungary) Videoton)
—	MF	ISR	Dan Einbinder (from Ironi Kiryat Shmona)
—	MF	ISR	Tamir Kahlon (was on loan to Hapoel Acre)
—	MF	ISR	Ben Ben Yair (was on loan to Hapoel Ramat Gan)
—	MF	ISR	Omri Altman (on loan from (England) Fulham)
—	FW	ISR	Barak Yitzhaki (was on loan to (Cyprus) Antorthosis)
—	FW	ISR	Tal Ben Haim (from Hapoel Tel Aviv)

Out:

No.	Pos.	Nation	Player
—	GK	ISR	Gal Tuvali (on loan to Maccabi Kabilio Jaffa)
—	GK	NGR	Vincent Enyeama (was on loan from (France) Lille OSC)
—	GK	ISR	Guy Haimov (to Ironi Kiryat Shmona)
—	DF	ISR	Dean Akafi (on loan to Maccabi Herzliya)
—	DF	ISR	Osher Abu (on loan to Hapoel Jerusalem)
—	DF	ISR	Rotem Bouskila (on loan to Hapoel Jerusalem)
—	DF	ISR	Omer Vered (Free Agent)
—	MF	ISR	Tamir Kahlon (to Ironi Kiryat Shmona)
—	MF	ISR	Ben Ben Yair (to Ironi Nir Ramat HaSharon)
—	MF	ISR	Hasan Abu Zaid (on loan to Ironi Nir Ramat HaSharon)
—	MF	ISR	Assaf Madar (on loan to Hapoel Ra'anana)
—	MF	ISR	Sharon Ziso (on loan to Beitar Tel Aviv Ramla)
—	FW	ESP	Gonzalo García (on loan to (Cyprus) Antorthosis)
—	FW	ISR	Eliran Atar (to (France) Stade de Reims)
—	FW	ISR	Roi Kahat (on loan to Maccabi Yavne)
—	FW	ISR	Roberto Colautti (to (Cyprus) Antorthosis)
—	FW	NGR	Lary Kahinda (on loan to Hakoah Amidar Ramat Gan)
—	FW	ISR	Eli Zizov (to Hapoel Acre)

=== Winter 2013–14 ===
In:

No.	Pos.	Nation	Player
—	DF	FRA	Rémi Maréval (from (Belgium) Gent)
—	MF	ISR	Hasan Abu Zaid (was on loan to Ironi Nir Ramat HaSharon)
—	FW	ISR	Barak Badash (from Ironi Kiryat Shmona)

Out:

No.	Pos.	Nation	Player
—	GK	CAN	Tomer Chencinski (on loan to Hakoah Amidar Ramat Gan)
—	DF	ESP	Mané (to (Spain) UD Almería)
—	DF	ISR	Yagil Biton (on loan to Ironi Nir Ramat HaSharon)
—	DF	ISR	Reef Peretz (on loan to Ironi Nir Ramat HaSharon)
—	MF	ISR	Moshe Lugasi (on loan to Beitar Jerusalem)
—	MF	ISR	Hasan Abu Zaid (on loan to (Cyprus) AEK Larnaca)
—	FW	ISR	Omri Perl (on loan to Hakoah Amidar Ramat Gan)
—	FW	ISR	Mu'nas Dabbur (to (Switzerland) Grasshopper)

== Matches ==
=== Pre-season friendlies ===
30 June 2013	Ingolstadt (Germany)	0–0	(Israel) Maccabi Tel Aviv
19:05		Report

3 July 2013	FC Krasnodar (Russia)	1–0	(Israel) Maccabi Tel Aviv
18:30	Petrov 24'	Report

6 July 2013	FC Liefering (Austria)	2–3	(Israel) Maccabi Tel Aviv
19:30	Bammer 14'; Gugganig 87'	Report (in Hebrew)	Ben Haim 28'; Zahavi 80'; Yitzhaki 83'

=== UEFA Champions League ===
==== Second qualifying round ====
17 July 2013	Győr (Hungary)	0–2	(Israel) Maccabi Tel Aviv	Győr, Hungary
20:30		Report	Yitzhaki 76'; Alberman 90+3'	Stadium: ETO Park; Attendance: 8,175; Referee: Markus Hameter (Austria)

23 July 2013	Maccabi Tel Aviv (Israel)	2–1	(Hungary) Győr	Tel Aviv, Israel
20:30	Ben Haim 25'; Zahavi 79'	Report	Martínez 86'	Stadium: Bloomfield Stadium; Attendance: 12,732; Referee: Martin Hansson (Sweden)

Maccabi Tel Aviv won 4–1 on aggregate.

==== Third qualifying round ====
30 July 2013	Basel (Switzerland)	1–0	(Israel) Maccabi Tel Aviv	Basel, Switzerland
19:00	Stocker 39'	Report		Stadium: St. Jakob-Park; Attendance: 12,353; Referee: Szymon Marciniak (Poland)

6 August 2013	Maccabi Tel Aviv (Israel)	3–3	(Switzerland) Basel	Tel Aviv, Israel
19:00	Schär 34' (o.g.); Zahavi 37'; Radi 55'	Report	Schär 5' (pen.); Salah 21'; Díaz 32'	Stadium: Bloomfield Stadium; Attendance: 13,100; Referee: Clément Turpin (France)

Basel won 4–3 on aggregate.

=== UEFA Europa League ===
==== Play-off round ====
22 August 2013	Maccabi Tel Aviv (Israel)	Cancelled	(Greece) PAOK	Tel Aviv, Israel
20:15		Report		Stadium: Bloomfield Stadium

29 August 2013	PAOK (Greece)	Cancelled	(Israel) Maccabi Tel Aviv	Thessaloniki, Greece
		Report		Stadium: Toumba Stadium

On 14 August 2013, Metalist Kharkiv were disqualified from the 2013–14 UEFA club competitions because of previous match-fixing. UEFA decided to replace Metalist Kharkiv in the Champions League play-off round with PAOK, who were eliminated by Metalist Kharkiv in the third qualifying round. Thus, Maccabi Tel Aviv, the opponent of PAOK in the Europa League play-off round, qualified directly for the Europa League group stage.

==== Group stage ====
Pos	Team	Pld	W	D	L	GF	GA	GD	Pts	Qualification
1	(Germany) Eintracht Frankfurt	6	5	0	1	13	4	+9	15	Advance to knockout phase
2	(Israel) Maccabi Tel Aviv	6	3	2	1	7	5	+2	11	Advance to knockout phase
3	(Cyprus) APOEL	6	1	2	3	3	8	−5	5	
4	(France) Bordeaux	6	1	0	5	4	10	−6	3	

Source: Soccerway

19 September 2013 Match 1	Maccabi Tel Aviv (Israel)	0–0	(Cyprus) APOEL	Tel Aviv, Israel
19:00		Report		Stadium: Bloomfield Stadium; Attendance: 11,772; Referee: Carlos Clos Gómez (Spain)

3 October 2013 Match 2	Bordeaux (France)	1–2	(Israel) Maccabi Tel Aviv	Bordeaux, France
21:05	Jussiê 48'	Report	Yitzhaki 71'; Micha 80'	Stadium: Stade Chaban-Delmas; Attendance: 7,329; Referee: Michael Koukoulakis (Greece)

24 October 2013 Match 3	Eintracht Frankfurt (Germany)	2–0	(Israel) Maccabi Tel Aviv	Frankfurt, Germany
21:05	Kadlec 13'; Meier 53'	Report		Stadium: Commerzbank-Arena; Attendance: 40,800; Referee: Antonio Damato (Italy)

7 November 2013 Match 4	Maccabi Tel Aviv (Israel)	4–2	(Germany) Eintracht Frankfurt	Tel Aviv, Israel
19:00	Zahavi 14', 90+4' (pen.); Yitzhaki 30', 35'	Report	Lakić 63'; Meier 67' (pen.)	Stadium: Bloomfield Stadium; Attendance: 13,232; Referee: Serge Gumienny (Belgium)

28 November 2013 Match 5	APOEL (Cyprus)	0–0	(Israel) Maccabi Tel Aviv	Nicosia, Cyprus
21:05		Report		Stadium: GSP Stadium; Attendance: 13,052; Referee: István Vad (Hungary)

12 December 2013 Match 6	Maccabi Tel Aviv (Israel)	1–0	(France) Bordeaux	Tel Aviv, Israel
19:00	Zahavi 74' (pen.)	Report		Stadium: Bloomfield Stadium; Attendance: 11,732; Referee: Serhiy Boyko (Ukraine)

==== Round of 32 ====
20 February 2014 Round of 32 – 1st leg	Maccabi Tel Aviv (Israel)	0–0	(Switzerland) Basel	Tel Aviv, Israel
21:05		Report		Stadium: Bloomfield Stadium; Attendance: 13,519; Referee: David Fernández Borbalán (Spain)

27 February 2014 Round of 32 – 2nd leg	Basel (Switzerland)	3–0	(Israel) Maccabi Tel Aviv	Basel, Switzerland
19:00	Stocker 17'; Streller 60', 71'	Report		Stadium: St. Jakob-Park; Attendance: 15,212; Referee: Ivan Bebek (Croatia)

Basel won 3–0 on aggregate.

=== Israel State Cup ===
==== Round of 32 ====
28 January 2014	F.C. Ashdod	2–1 (a.e.t.)	Maccabi Tel Aviv	Ashdod
21:00 (IST)	Beckel 45+1' (pen.), 113' (pen.)	Summary; Report (Hebrew)	Zahavi 88'; Ziv (yellow card) 18' (red card) 106'	Stadium: Yud-Alef Stadium; Referee: Alon Yefet

=== Israeli Premier League ===
24 August 2013 Match 1	Hapoel Acre	0–2	Maccabi Tel Aviv	Acre
17:50	Taga (yellow card) 7'; Dayan (yellow card) 25'; Jovanović (yellow card) 32'	Summary	Yitzhaki 1' (yellow card) 62'; Zahavi 6'	Stadium: Acre Municipal Stadium; Referee: Menashe Mashiach

1 September 2013 Match 2	Maccabi Tel Aviv	1–0	Bnei Yehuda	Tel Aviv
21:00	Carlos García Badías (yellow card) 56'; Yeini (yellow card) 75'; Prica 90+1'	Summary	Zhairi (yellow card) 26'; Zamir (yellow card) 75'; Oz Raly (yellow card) 83'	Stadium: Bloomfield Stadium; Referee: Alon Yefet

23 September 2013 Match 3	Maccabi Haifa	0–3	Maccabi Tel Aviv	Haifa
21:00	Keinan (yellow card) 73'; Turgeman (yellow card) 74'	Summary	Alberman (yellow card) 28'; Yitzhaki 50' (yellow card) 77'; Prica 60', 75'	Stadium: Kiryat Eliezer Stadium; Referee: Roi Reinschreiber

28 September 2013 Match 4	Maccabi Tel Aviv	3–0	Ironi Kiryat Shmona	Tel Aviv
20:00	Zahavi 8'; Dabour 21'; Tal Ben Haim 45'	Summary	Kassio (yellow card) 7'; Kahlon (yellow card) 74'	Stadium: Bloomfield Stadium; Referee: Erez Papir

6 October 2013 Match 5	F.C. Ashdod	0–0	Maccabi Tel Aviv	Ashdod
20:10	Michael Siroshtein (yellow card) 18'; Lenkebe (yellow card) 32'; Oshaniwa (yellow card) 55'; Kinda (yellow card) 80'	Summary	Yeini (yellow card) 56'; Tibi (yellow card) 82'; Yitzhaki (yellow card) 85'	Stadium: Yud-Alef Stadium; Referee: Menashe Mashiach

20 October 2013 Match 6	Maccabi Tel Aviv	1–0	Hapoel Nir Ramat HaSharon	Tel Aviv
20:10	Tibi (yellow card) 40'; Zahavi 47'	Summary	Ben Reichert (yellow card) 4'	Stadium: Bloomfield Stadium; Referee: Eitan Shmulevich

28 October 2013 Match 7	Maccabi Tel Aviv	4–1	Bnei Sakhnin	Tel Aviv
21:00	Zahavi 4', 16'; Dabour (yellow card) 23' (goal) 53'; Mitrović 41' (yellow card) 87'	Summary	Khaled Khalaila (yellow card) 31'; Dedi Ben Dayan (yellow card) 40'; Ganayem 45'; Cristian (yellow card) 54'; Gazal (red card) 88'	Stadium: Bloomfield Stadium; Referee: Erez Papir

4 November 2013 Match 8	Hapoel Be'er Sheva	3–2	Maccabi Tel Aviv	Be'er Sheva
21:00	Siraj Nassar 31' (yellow card) 31'; Barda 52' (yellow card) 72'; Ben Algrabli (yellow card) 70'; Dovev Gabay 72' (yellow card) 73'; Ejide (yellow card) 85'	Summary	Dabour 10'; Tal Ben Haim 54'; Zahavi (yellow card) 55'; Mané (yellow card) 57'; Yeini (yellow card) 62'; Tibi (yellow card) 67'; Prica (yellow card) 90'	Stadium: Vasermil Stadium; Referee: Daniel Bar Natan

11 November 2013 Match 9	Maccabi Tel Aviv	2–2	Maccabi Petah Tikva	Tel Aviv
20:00	Zahavi 49' (pen.); Mitrović 59'; Yeini (yellow card) 90+2' (red card) 90+2'; Tal Ben Haim (yellow card) 90+4'	Summary	Mané 75' (o.g.); Saba (yellow card) 77' (goal) 78'; Hagay Goldenberg (yellow card) 87'	Stadium: Bloomfield Stadium; Referee: Shay Shitrit

23 November 2013 Match 10	Hapoel Haifa	1–3	Maccabi Tel Aviv	Haifa
17:00	Dora (yellow card) 22'; Korać 32'; Or Ostvind (yellow card) 47'; Azam (yellow card) 67' (yellow-red card); Amir Nussbaum (yellow card) 76'; Avidor (yellow card) 80'	Summary	Tal Ben Haim (yellow card) 32' (goal) 83'; Ziv (yellow card) 47'; Tibi (yellow card) 47'; Omri Ben Harush 50'; Yitzhaki 76' (pen.)	Stadium: Kiryat Eliezer Stadium; Referee: Eli Hachmon

2 December 2013 Match 11	Maccabi Tel Aviv	3–1	Hapoel Ra'anana	Tel Aviv
20:50	Munas Dabbur 1'; Radi 6'; Prica (yellow card) 36'; Ben Haim 65'	Summary	Nimni (yellow card) 45'; Lavi (yellow card) 53'; Loui Taha (yellow card) 57'; Cohen (yellow card) 68'; Mamadou Touré Thiam 72'	Stadium: Bloomfield Stadium; Referee: Roi Reinschreiber

8 December 2013 Match 12	Beitar Jerusalem	1–2	Maccabi Tel Aviv	Jerusalem
20:50	Kapiloto (yellow card) 51'; Kriaf (yellow card) 59'; Bryan 83'; Moshe (yellow card) 90'	Summary	Prica 2' (yellow card) 74'; Yitzhaki (yellow card) 23' (goal) 40'; Ben Haim (yellow card) 59'; Yeini (yellow card) 90'	Stadium: Teddy Stadium; Referee: Erez Papir

16 December 2013 Match 13	Maccabi Tel Aviv	1–0	Hapoel Tel Aviv	Tel Aviv
20:50	Zahavi 29' (pen.); Yeini (yellow card) 71'; Juan Pablo Colinas (yellow card) 84'	Summary	Safouri (yellow card) 32'; Jurgen Colin (yellow card) 33'; Vermouth (yellow card) 56'; Zaguri (yellow card) 59'; Malka (yellow card) 90'	Stadium: Bloomfield Stadium; Referee: Liran Liani

21 December 2013 Match 14	Maccabi Tel Aviv	5–0	Hapoel Acre	Tel Aviv
19:15	Zahavi 24' 45+1' (pen.); Carlos García Badías (yellow card) 38'; Micha 57'; Prica 74'; Alberman 88'	Summary	Juliano Spadacio (yellow card) 38'; Shabtay (yellow card) 41'; Gotlieb (yellow card) 44'; Oremuš (yellow card) 65'	Stadium: Bloomfield Stadium; Referee: Daniel Bar Natan

28 December 2013 Match 15	Bnei Yehuda	0–2	Maccabi Tel Aviv	Tel Aviv
20:00	Zhairi (yellow card) 40'; Azuz (yellow card) 67'; Agayov (yellow card) 70'; Itzhak (yellow card) 83'	Summary	Zahavi 41' (pen.); Alberman (yellow card) 66'; Prica 76'; Ziv (yellow card) 90'	Stadium: Bloomfield Stadium; Referee: Eitan Shmulevich

6 January 2014 Match 16	Maccabi Tel Aviv	3–1	Maccabi Haifa	Tel Aviv
20:50	Zahavi (yellow card) 40'; Prica 49' (yellow card) 79'; Yeini 56'; Yitzhaki 70'	Summary	Cocalić (yellow card) 18'; Falah (yellow card) 36' (red card) 46'; Turgeman 64'; Katan (yellow card) 80'	Stadium: Bloomfield Stadium; Referee: Alon Yefet

13 January 2014 Match 17	Ironi Kiryat Shmona	3–1	Maccabi Tel Aviv	Kiryat Shmona
20:50	Barak Badash 6', 69'; Panka 23'; Elkayam (yellow card) 52'; Mizrahi (yellow card) 63'; Manga (yellow card) 66'	Summary	Yitzhaki (yellow card) 45'; Zahavi 86'; Munas Dabbur (yellow card) 90'	Stadium: Kiryat Shmona Municipal Stadium; Referee: Eitan Shmulevich

18 January 2014 Match 18	Maccabi Tel Aviv	2–0	F.C. Ashdod	Tel Aviv
17:00	Lenkebe 3' (o.g.); Zahavi 81' (yellow card) 81'	Summary	Beckel (yellow card) 32'; Michael Siroshtein (yellow card) 34'	Stadium: Bloomfield Stadium; Referee: Liran Liani

25 January 2014 Match 19	Hapoel Nir Ramat HaSharon	0–3	Maccabi Tel Aviv	Ramat HaSharon
20:10	Liran Katzav (yellow card) 45'; Strool (yellow card) 52'	Summary	Radi 25' (yellow card) 39'; Carlos García Badías (yellow card) 38' (goal) 53'; Micha 80'	Stadium: Grundman Stadium; Referee: Guy Berger

2 February 2014 Match 20	Bnei Sakhnin	0–2	Maccabi Tel Aviv	Sakhnin
20:50	Ganayem (yellow card) 16'; Khalaila (yellow card) 26' (yellow-red card); Ottman (yellow card) 82'	Summary	Yitzhaki 6'; Prica 43'; Mitrović (yellow card) 90'	Stadium: Doha Stadium; Referee: Eli Hachmon

9 February 2014 Match 21	Maccabi Tel Aviv	3–1	Hapoel Be'er Sheva	Tel Aviv
20:50	Prica 3'; Yeini (yellow card) 38'; Carlos García Badías 45'; Yitzhaki 65'; Radi (yellow card) 72'	Summary	Algrabli (red card) 8'; Harel (yellow card) 31'; Plet 34' (yellow card) 34'; Bitton (yellow card) 65'	Stadium: Bloomfield Stadium; Referee: Menashe Mashiach

15 February 2014 Match 22	Maccabi Petah Tikva	0–2	Maccabi Tel Aviv	Petah Tikva
19:30	Lidor Cohen (yellow card) 33'; Merey (yellow card) 76'	Summary	Maréval 29'; Badash 47'; Ben Haim (yellow card) 66'; Carlos García Badías (yellow card) 76'	Stadium: HaMoshava Stadium; Referee: Orel Grinfeld

23 February 2014 Match 23	Maccabi Tel Aviv	2–2	Hapoel Haifa	Tel Aviv
20:15	Zahavi 68', 73'; Carlos García Badías (yellow card) 88'; Radi (yellow card) 90'	Summary	Nussbaum 15'; Korać 52'; Revivo (yellow card) 55'	Stadium: Bloomfield Stadium; Referee: Liran Wachsberger

2 March 2014 Match 24	Hapoel Ra'anana	0–2	Maccabi Tel Aviv	Netanya
21:00	Nimni (yellow card) 16'; Mamadou Touré Thiam (yellow card) 30'; Mbola (yellow card) 75'; Snir Shuker (yellow card) 80'; Nwakaeme (yellow card) 82'	Summary	Prica 22'; Einbinder (yellow card) 47'; Zahavi 81'	Stadium: Netanya Stadium; Referee: Liran Liani

10 March 2014 Match 25	Maccabi Tel Aviv	1–0	Beitar Jerusalem	Tel Aviv
20:50	Prica (yellow card) 24' (goal) 74'; Einbinder (yellow card) 42'; Ben Harush (yellow card) 65'; Ziv (yellow card) 90+1'	Summary	Túñez (yellow card) 16'; Jonathan Vila (yellow card) 50'	Stadium: Bloomfield Stadium; Referee: Orel Grinfeld

17 March 2014 Match 26	Hapoel Tel Aviv	2–3	Maccabi Tel Aviv	Tel Aviv
20:55	Damari 43' 87' (pen.)	Summary	Alberman (yellow card) 24'; Zahavi 34' 89' (pen.) 90+3'; Prica (red card) 38'; Mitrović (yellow card) 63'; Juan Pablo (yellow card) 86'	Stadium: Bloomfield Stadium; Referee: Eli Hachmon

== Israeli Premier League Championship Round ==
24 March 2014 27	Maccabi Tel Aviv	0–0	Hapoel Tel Aviv	Tel Aviv
20:50	Yeini (yellow card) 36'	Summary	Levi (yellow card) 20'; Harush (yellow card) 31'	Stadium: Bloomfield Stadium; Referee: Alon Yefet

31 March 2014 28	Maccabi Tel Aviv	2–0	Hapoel Be'er Sheva	Tel Aviv
20:55	Badash 2', 27' Ben Haim (yellow card) 29'	Report		Stadium: Bloomfield Stadium; Referee: Liran Liani

7 April 2014 29	Ironi Kiryat Shmona	2–2	Maccabi Tel Aviv	Kiryat Shmona
20:50	Kassio (yellow card) 60'; Manga 65'; Amasha 84'	Report	Badash (yellow card) 51'; Zahavi 61', 80'; Ben Haim (yellow card) 64'; Alberman (yellow card) 90'	Stadium: Kiryat Shmona Municipal Stadium; Referee: Ziv Adler

13 April 2014 30	Maccabi Tel Aviv	1–0	Maccabi Haifa	Tel Aviv
20:50	Alberman 90+2'	Report		Stadium: Bloomfield Stadium; Attendance: 12,883; Referee: Erez Papir

21 April 2014 31	Bnei Sakhnin	2–1	Maccabi Tel Aviv	Sakhnin
20:50		Report		Stadium: Doha Stadium

26 April 2014 32	Hapoel Tel Aviv	3–1	Maccabi Tel Aviv	Tel Aviv
20:00		Report		Stadium: Bloomfield Stadium; Attendance: 11,300

3 May 2014 33	Hapoel Be'er Sheva	1–2	Maccabi Tel Aviv	Be'er Sheva
20:50		Report		Stadium: Vasermil Stadium; Attendance: 10,500

11 May 2014 34	Maccabi Tel Aviv	3–1	Ironi Kiryat Shmona	Tel Aviv
19:30		Report		Stadium: Bloomfield Stadium; Attendance: 12,789

14 May 2014 35	Maccabi Haifa	2–2	Maccabi Tel Aviv	Haifa
19:30		Report		Stadium: Kiryat Eliezer Stadium; Attendance: 14,000

17 May 2014 36	Maccabi Tel Aviv	4–1	Bnei Sakhnin	Tel Aviv
20:00		Report		Stadium: Bloomfield Stadium; Attendance: 7,826
