= Zhairi =

Zhairi is a surname. Notable people with the surname include:

- Ben Zhairi (born 1992), Israeli footballer
- Liroy Zhairi (born 1989), Israeli footballer
