= Nevo Mizrahi =

Israeli footballer

Nevo Mizrahi נבו מזרחי
Personal information
- Full name: Nevo Mizrahi
- Date of birth: July 26, 1987 (age 39)
- Place of birth: Yavne, Israel
- Position: Striker

Team information
- Current team: Beitar Tel Aviv

Youth career
- Shimshon Tel Aviv

Senior career*
Years	Team	Apps	(Gls)
2006–2007	Sektzia Ness Ziona	19	(3)
2007–2009	Hapoel Marmorek	42	(8)
2009–2012	F.C. Ashdod	34	(5)
2012	→ Beitar Tel Aviv Ramla (loan)	14	(7)
2012–2013	→ Hapoel Bnei Lod (loan)	31	(6)
2013–2014	Maccabi Yavne	18	(5)
2014–2015	Hapoel Jerusalem	39	(16)
2015–2016	Maccabi Netanya	19	(0)
2016	Hapoel Kfar Saba	5	(0)
2016–2017	Hapoel Ashkelon	8	(0)
2017	Maccabi Sha'arayim	18	(1)
2017–2019	Maccabi Yavne	41	(10)
2019	Beitar Nordia Jerusalem	11	(4)
2019–2020	Maccabi Herzliya	10	(4)
2020–2021	F.C. Holon Yermiyahu	18	(4)
2021	Hapoel Bik'at HaYarden	7	(2)
2021–2022	Hapoel Qalansawe	22	(17)
2022–2023	F.C. Kiryat Yam	24	(21)
2023	F.C. Tira	8	(1)
2023–2024	Beitar Tel Aviv	3	(1)
- * Club domestic league appearances and goals

Nevo Mizrahi (Hebrew: נבו מזרחי; born 26 July 1987) is an Israeli former footballer.
