= Or Ostvind =

Israeli footballer

Personal information
- Full name: Or Ostvind
- Date of birth: 18 December 1987 (age 38)
- Place of birth: Ramat HaSharon, Israel
- Position: Defensive midfielder

Team information
- Current team: Maccabi Herzliya
- Number: 4

Youth career
- Hapoel Ramat HaSharon

Senior career*
Years	Team	Apps	(Gls)
2007–2013	Hapoel Ramat HaSharon	93	(4)
2008	→ Beitar Shimshon Tel Aviv (loan)	7	(1)
2013–2015	Hapoel Haifa	60	(2)
2015–2016	Ironi Kiryat Shmona	29	(2)
2016–2017	Hapoel Ramat HaSharon	11	(5)
2017–2018	Hapoel Tel Aviv	29	(3)
2018–2019	Hapoel Ramat Gan	11	(1)
2019–2024	Hapoel Ramat HaSharon	148	(24)
2024–	Maccabi Herzliya	19	(1)
- * Club domestic league appearances and goals as of 15 June 2025

Or Ostvind (Hebrew: אור אוסטוינד; born 18 December 1987) is an Israeli footballer who currently plays for Maccabi Herzliya.
