= Dan Roman (footballer, born 1982) =

Israeli footballer

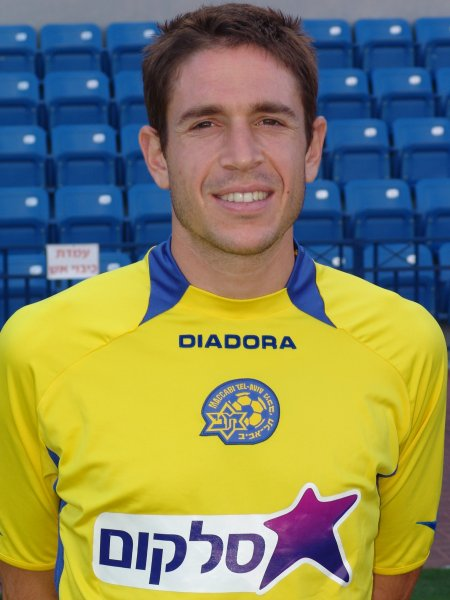

Personal information
- Full name: Dan Roman
- Date of birth: August 27, 1982 (age 44)
- Place of birth: Jerusalem, Israel
- Position: Midfielder

Youth career
- Hapoel Jerusalem

Senior career*
Years	Team	Apps	(Gls)
1999–2007	Hapoel Jerusalem		
2006–2007	Hakoah Amidar Ramat Gan (loan)	32	(1)
2007–2009	Maccabi Tel Aviv	24	(0)
2009–2010	Maccabi Petah Tikva	27	(1)
2010–2011	Hapoel Ramat Gan	12	(0)
2011–2012	SC Veendam	28	(1)
2012–2013	Beitar Tel Aviv Ramla	37	(10)
2013–2014	Hapoel Katamon Jerusalem	10	(0)
2014	Hapoel Ramat Gan	17	(4)
2014–2015	Maccabi Sha'arayim	24	(2)

Managerial career
- 2020–2021: Maccabi Netanya (caretaker)
- 2021–2024: Maccabi Netanya (youth)
- 2024: Maccabi Petah Tikva
- * Club domestic league appearances and goals

Dan Roman (Hebrew: דן רומן; born 27 August 1982) is a former Israeli footballer.

== Honours ==
- Third Division:
  - Winner (1): 2001-02
- Toto Cup:
  - Winner (1): 2008-09
