= Galil Ben Shanan =

Israeli footballer

Galil Ben Shanan גליל בן שנאן
Personal information
- Full name: Galil Ben Shanan
- Date of birth: 27 June 1982 (age 44)
- Place of birth: Holon, Israel
- Height: 1.81 m (5 ft 11 1/2 in)
- Position: Goalkeeper

Youth career
- Hapoel Ramat Gan

Senior career*
Years	Team	Apps	(Gls)
2001–2002	Hapoel Ramat Gan		
2002–2015	Hapoel Tel Aviv		
2005–2006	→ Maccabi Ramat Amidar (loan)		
2006–2007	→ Hapoel Marmorek (loan)		
2008–2010	→ Hapoel Haifa (loan)	47	(0)
2010	→ Hapoel Marmorek (loan)	13	(0)
2012	→ Maccabi Be'er Sheva (loan)	15	(0)
2012–2013	→ Hapoel Be'er Sheva (loan)	6	(0)
2013–2015	→ Hapoel Ashkelon (loan)	64	(0)
2015–2016	Hapoel Ashkelon	18	(0)
2016–2017	Maccabi Yavne	27	(0)

International career
1999	Israel U16	8	(0)
2001	Israel U18	5	(0)

Managerial career
- 2016–2018: Hapoel Ashkelon (goalkeepers)
- 2019–2020: Beitar Tel Aviv Bat Yam (goalkeepers)
- 2020–: Sektzia Ness Ziona (goalkeepers)
- * Club domestic league appearances and goals

Galil Ben Shanan (Hebrew: גליל בן שנאן) is a former Israeli football goalkeeper.

== International League Records ==
- Hapoel Tel Aviv

Year	Competition	Apps	Goal
2010	UEFA Champions League	2	0
Total		2	0
