= Elnatan Salami =

Israeli footballer (born 1986)

Elnatan Salami אלנתן סלמי
Personal information
- Full name: Elnatan Salami
- Date of birth: April 5, 1986 (age 40)
- Place of birth: Petah Tikva, Israel
- Position: Striker

Team information
- Current team: Hapoel Mahane Yehuda

Youth career
- Hapoel Petah Tikva

Senior career*
Years	Team	Apps	(Gls)
2003–2007	Hapoel Petah Tikva	62	(6)
2007–2008	Maccabi Herzliya	12	(0)
2008	Hapoel Petah Tikva	0	(0)
2008–2009	Maccabi Netanya	5	(0)
2009	→ Hapoel Kfar Saba (loan)	16	(6)
2009–2010	Hapoel Petah Tikva	31	(6)
2010–2011	Sektzia Ness Ziona	31	(8)
2011–2012	Maccabi Ahi Nazareth	16	(7)
2012	Hapoel Acre	0	(0)
2013	Beitar Tel Aviv Ramla	20	(4)
2013–2014	Hapoel Afula	14	(2)
2014–2015	F.C. Shikun HaMizrah	30	(7)
2015–2016	Beitar Kfar Saba	29	(11)
2016	Hapoel Mahane Yehuda	13	(2)
2016–2018	Beitar Kfar Saba	47	(7)
2019	Hapoel Bik'at HaYarden	2	(0)
2019–2020	Beitar Petah Tikva	6	(0)
2022	Beitar Kfar Saba	1	(0)

International career
2002–2003	Israel U17	12	(3)
2004	Israel U18	4	(0)
2003	Israel U19	1	(0)
2004	Israel U21	1	(0)
- * Club domestic league appearances and goals as of 1 January 2021

Elnatan Salami (Hebrew: אלנתן סלמי; born April 5, 1986) is an Israeli footballer who plays for Beitar Petah Tikva. He previously played for Hapoel Petah Tikva, Maccabi Herzliya, Maccabi Netanya, Hapoel Acre, Beitar Tel Aviv Ramla, Hapoel Afula, F.C. Shikun HaMizrah, Sektzia Ness Ziona and Hapoel Kfar Saba. At international level, Salami was capped at levels from under-17 to under-21.

== Career ==
Salami has started his career in Hapoel Petah Tikva youth club and in the 2003/04 season he was promoted to the senior team. Salami won the Toto Cup with Petah Tikva in 2004/05, and stayed with the club another two seasons until it dropped to the second league. He played 20 games with Petah Tikva during the 2006/07 season, earning three yellow cards. In the 2007/08 season, Salami moved to Maccabi Herzliya and played 12 games, earning three yellow cards but failing to score a goal. At the end of that season Herzliyya dropped to the second league, but at the start of the next season he moved back to Hapoel Petah Tikva. In the beginning of the 2008/09 season, towards the end of September, Salami moved to Maccabi Netanya and was released at the end of December to Hapoel Kfar Saba.
