= Yogev Ben Simon =

Israeli footballer (born 1986)

Yogev Ben Simon יוגב בן סימון
Personal information
- Full name: Yogev Ben Simon
- Date of birth: 6 April 1986 (age 40)
- Place of birth: Rishon LeZion, Israel
- Position: Left back

Youth career
- Ironi Rishon LeZion

Senior career*
Years	Team	Apps	(Gls)
2004–2007	Ironi Rishon LeZion		
2006–2007	→ Ironi Ramat HaSharon (loan)	12	(0)
2007–2009	Sektzia Ness Ziona	32	(0)
2009–2011	Hakoah Amidar Ramat Gan	48	(6)
2011–2013	Hapoel Ramat Gan	36	(0)
2013–2014	Hapoel Petah Tikva	32	(0)
2014–2015	Hapoel Rishon LeZion	31	(1)
2015–2017	Maccabi Sha'arayim	59	(0)
2017–2018	Maccabi Kiryat Gat	25	(1)
- * Club domestic league appearances and goals

Yogev Ben Simon (Hebrew: יוגב בן סימון; born 6 April 1986) is a former Israeli footballer.
