= Hana Nasser =

Israeli footballer

Hanna Nassir חנא נאסר
Personal information
- Full name: Hanna Nassir חנא נאסר
- Date of birth: 27 March 1991 (age 35)
- Place of birth: Kafr Yasif, Israel
- Position: Left back

Youth career
- Maccabi Haifa

Senior career*
Years	Team	Apps	(Gls)
2010–2011	Hapoel Acre	7	(0)
2011–2012	Maccabi Ironi Bat Yam	28	(0)
2012–2013	Maccabi Umm al-Fahm	27	(0)
2013–2014	Hakoah Amidar Ramat Gan	27	(0)
2015–2016	Hapoel Bnei Lod	0	(0)
2017	Tzeirei Kafr Kanna	5	(0)
2017–2018	Maccabi Daliyat al-Karmel	6	(0)
2019	Maccabi Bnei Reineh	10	(0)
2019–2020	Ihud Bnei Kafr Yasif	10	(2)
- * Club domestic league appearances and goals

Hana Nasser
Medal record

Representing Israel

Football

Maccabiah Games
Bronze medal – third place	2009 Maccabiah	Football

Hana Nasser (Arabic: حنا ناصر, Hebrew: חנא נאסר; born 27 March 1991) is an Israeli former professional footballer.

== Biography ==
=== Playing career ===
Nassar made his professional debut, coming on as a substitute for Alon Harazi, in a 0–0 Toto Cup draw against Hapoel Be'er Sheva on 11 November 2009.

==== International career ====
Nasser represented Israel at the 2009 Maccabiah Games, winning a bronze medal.

== Statistics ==
Club performance			League		Cup		League Cup		Total	
Season	Club	League	Apps	Goals	Apps	Goals	Apps	Goals	Apps	Goals
Israel			League		Israel State Cup		Toto Cup		Total	
2010-11	Hapoel Akko	Ligat ha'Al	7	0	1	0	2	0	10	0
2011-12	Maccabi Ironi Bat Yam	Liga Leumit	28	0	1	0	7	0	36	0
2012-13	Maccabi Umm al-Fahm	Liga Leumit	27	0	2	0	0	0	29	0
2013-14	Hakoah Amidar Ramat Gan	Liga Leumit	27	0	1	0	0	0	28	0
Career total			89	0	5	0	9	0	103	0
