= Avi Ivgi =

Israeli footballer

Avi Ivgi אבי איבגי
Personal information
- Full name: Avi Ivgi
- Date of birth: 2 October 1978 (age 48)
- Place of birth: Nazareth Illit, Israel
- Height: 1.80 m (5 ft 11 in)
- Position: Goalkeeper

Team information
- Current team: Tomy Tel Aviv

Youth career
- Hapoel Nazareth Illit

Senior career*
Years	Team	Apps	(Gls)
1996–2001	Hapoel Nazareth Illit		
2001–2003	Bnei Yehuda Tel Aviv	63	(0)
2003–2006	Hapoel Kfar Saba	93	(0)
2006–2007	Beitar Jerusalem	2	(0)
2007–2008	Ironi Rishon LeZion	29	(0)
2008–2009	Maccabi Petah Tikva	0	(0)
2009–2010	Hapoel Nazareth Illit	32	(0)
2010–2013	Maccabi Herzliya	99	(0)
2013–2014	Hapoel Petah Tikva	36	(0)
2014–2016	Maccabi Herzliya	68	(0)
2016–2017	Hapoel Petah Tikva	36	(0)
2017–2019	Hapoel Nazareth Illit	65	(0)
2019–2020	Hapoel Marmorek	24	(0)
2020–2021	Maccabi Herzliya	18	(0)
2021–2022	Hapoel Qalansawe	25	(0)
2022–2023	Beitar Raamt Gan	7	(0)
2023–2024	Beitar Tel Aviv Bat Yam	20	(0)
2024–	Tomy Tel Aviv	26	(0)

International career
2011–2013	Israel (beach soccer)	5	(0)
- * Club domestic league appearances and goals as of 4 December 2025

Avi Ivgi (Hebrew: אבי איבגי; born 2 October 1978) is an Israeli professional football goalkeeper who plays for Liga Alef club Hapoel Qalansawe . He previously played for Bnei Yehuda Tel Aviv, Hapoel Kfar Saba, Beitar Jerusalem, Hapoel Rishon LeZion, Maccabi Petah Tikva, Hapoel Petah Tikva and Hapoel Nazareth Illit.

Ivgi came through the Hapoel Nazareth Illit youth squad. He made his debut for the club's senior team in the 1996–97 season against Hapoel Majd al-Krum. In 2001 Ivgi moved to Bnei Yehuda and helped them gain promotion to the Israeli Premier League in the 2001–02 season. In 2003, he joined Hapoel Kfar Saba, then in the Liga Leumit. They finished in fourth place in his first season, and in his second, 2004–05, they won the Liga Leumit championship and promotion to the Israeli Premier League. After one season in the top flight with Hapoel Kfar Saba, Ivgi went on to spend a year each with Beitar Jerusalem, Hapoel Rishon LeZion and Maccabi Petah Tikva, before returning to Hapoel Nazareth Illit for 2009-10. He moved on to Maccabi Herzliya in 2010 until 2013. In 2013, he moved to Hapoel Petah Tikva.

== Honours ==
- Liga Alef
  - Runner-up (1): 1998-99
- Liga Leumit
  - Winner (1): 2004–05
  - Runner-up (1): 2001-02, 2013–14
- Israeli Premier League
  - Winner (1): 2006-07
