= Eden Batit =

Israeli footballer

Eden Batit עדן באט
Personal information
- Full name: Eden Batit
- Date of birth: 14 September 1990 (age 36)
- Place of birth: Ashdod, Israel
- Position: Left winger

Team information
- Current team: F.C. Ashdod
- Number: 12

Youth career
- F.C. Ashdod

Senior career*
Years	Team	Apps	(Gls)
2010–	F.C. Ashdod	8	(0)
2011–2012	→ Hakoah Amidar Ramat Gan (loan)	48	(4)
2013	→ Maccabi Yavne (loan)	7	(1)
2013–2014	→ Hapoel Acre (loan)	8	(0)
2014–2015	→ Hapoel Ramat Gan (loan)	31	(0)
- * Club domestic league appearances and goals as of 20 August 2015

Eden Batit (Hebrew: עדן באט; born 14 September 1990) is a retired Israeli football forward of who played for F.C. Ashdod.

== Career ==
Eden Batit became a professional football player 2010. He debuted with F.C. Ashdod in 2010. Most of his career was spent on loan to various Israel Football League teams.

Batit appeared in 101 professional football games, scoring 5 goals throughout the 7 teams and 17 years of his professional career. The goals all took place in 2012. He received a total of 5 yellow cards during his 17-year career, with all 5 taking place during his time with Hakoah Amidar Ramat Gan F.C.
