= Snir Dori =

Israeli football goalkeeper

Snir Dori שניר דורי
Personal information
- Full name: Snir Dori
- Date of birth: August 4, 1987 (age 39)
- Place of birth: Petah Tikva, Israel
- Height: 1.87 m (6 ft 1 1/2 in)
- Position: Goalkeeper

Team information
- Current team: Hapoel Herzliya

Senior career*
Years	Team	Apps	(Gls)
2007–2013	Hapoel Petah Tikva	104	(0)
2013–2016	Maccabi Netanya	6	(0)
2016	Hapoel Petah Tikva	11	(0)
2016–2018	Hapoel Herzliya	29	(0)
- * Club domestic league appearances and goals

Snir Dori (Hebrew: שניר דורי; born August 4, 1987), is an Israeli football goalkeeper. Who is now retired and serves as a goalkeepers coach at the Israel Football Association

Snir Dori (Hebrew: שניר דורי; born August 4, 1987), is an Israeli football goalkeeper. Dori began to play in Hapoel Petah Tikva youth teams in 1997. He moved up from the under-16 team to the youth team of the club in 2007–08 and to the first team in 2009.

In 2013 after serving as the captain of the team Dori moved for the first time and sign a contract in Maccabi Netanya. During his 3 seasons at Maccabi Netanya in which he helped the team to qualify to the Israeli premier League and for the Israeli state cup final, Dori came back to his home club and signed a new contract with Hapoel Petah Tikva

Coaching Career

After retiring from professional football, Dori began working as a goalkeeper coach. He was involved with the youth academies of Hapoel Petah Tikva and Maccabi Tel Aviv

Since 2022, he is serving as a goalkeeper coach in the Israel national team's youth academy project, working specifically with The Israel national under-17 football team represents Israel in association football at the under-17 youth level, and is controlled by the Israel Football Association.

---
