= Mahmoud Abbas (footballer) =

Israeli footballer

Mahmoud Abbas محمود عباس
Personal information
- Full name: Mahmoud Abbas
- Date of birth: July 29, 1988 (age 38)
- Place of birth: Haifa, Israel
- Position: Midfielder

Team information
- Current team: Hapoel Tirat HaCarmel
- Number: 7

Youth career
- F.C. Neve Yosef

Senior career*
Years	Team	Apps	(Gls)
2007–2008	Hapoel Umm al-Fahm	26	(2)
2008–2010	Ahva Arraba	52	(7)
2010–2011	Hapoel Ashkelon	30	(7)
2011–2013	Hapoel Tel Aviv	20	(0)
2012–2013	→ Bnei Sakhnin (loan)	19	(0)
2013–2016	Hapoel Bnei Lod	79	(9)
2016–2017	Hapoel Acre	26	(0)
2017–2018	Hapoel Umm al-Fahm	29	(5)
2018	Shimshon Kafr Qasim	5	(2)
2018–2019	Hapoel Baqa al-Gharbiyye	22	(5)
2019–2020	Maccabi Tamra	20	(2)
2020–2022	Hapoel Bnei Fureidis	46	(10)
2022	Ahva Reineh	1	(0)
2022–2024	Hapoel Bnei Fureidis	41	(8)
2024–	Hapoel Tirat HaCarmel	10	(4)
- * Club domestic league appearances and goals as of 1 July 2024

Mahmoud Abbas (Arabic: محمود عباس; Hebrew: מחמוד עבאס; born July 29, 1988) is an Israeli footballer currently playing for Hapoel Tirat HaCarmel.

== Honors ==
- Israeli Premier League:
  - Runners-up (1): 2011–12 (with Hapoel Tel Aviv)
- Liga Alef North (1):
  - 2008–09 (with Ahva Arraba)
- Israel State Cup (1):
  - 2011–12 (with Hapoel Tel Aviv)
- Toto Cup Leumit (1):
  - 2014–15 (with Hapoel Bnei Lod)

== Statistics ==
Club performance			League		Cup		League Cup		Continental		Total	
Season	Club	League	Apps	Goals	Apps	Goals	Apps	Goals	Apps	Goals	Apps	Goals
2007–08	Hapoel Umm al-Fahm	Liga Alef North	26	2	3	0	-	-	0	0	29	2
2008–09	Ahva Arraba	Liga Alef North	24	4	3	0	–	–	–	–	27	4
2009–10	Ahva Arraba	Liga Leumit	28	3	1	0	6	1	–	–	35	4
2010–11	Hapoel Ashkelon	Ligat HaAl	30	7	1	0	5	1	–	–	36	8
2011–12	Hapoel Tel Aviv	Ligat HaAl	20	0	2	1	5	2	6	0	31	3
2012–13	Bnei Sakhnin (loan)	Ligat HaAl	19	0	2	0	1	0	–	–	22	0
2013–14	Hapoel Bnei Lod	Liga Leumit	29	5	2	2	0	0	–	–	31	7
2014–15	Hapoel Bnei Lod	Liga Leumit	21	4	0	0	5	0	–	–	26	4
Career total			197	25	14	3	22	4	0	0	237	32
