= Naor Dahan =

Israeli footballer

Naor Dahan נאור דהן
Personal information
- Full name: Naor Dahan
- Date of birth: 26 September 1990 (age 36)
- Place of birth: Zikhron Ya'akov, Israel
- Position: Defender

Team information
- Current team: Hapoel Beit She'an
- Number: 99

Youth career
- 2003–2007: Beitar Nes Tubruk
- 2007–2008: Hapoel Hadera
- 2008–2009: Beitar Nes Tubruk

Senior career*
Years	Team	Apps	(Gls)
2008–2009	Beitar Nes Tubruk	23	(9)
2009–2010	Maccabi Ironi Tirat HaCarmel	2	(0)
2010–2011	Hapoel Hadera	18	(0)
2011–2012	Maccabi Be'er Sheva	12	(0)
2012–2013	Hapoel Asi Gilboa	22	(2)
2013–2014	Hapoel Acre	1	(0)
2015	Hapoel Herzliya	5	(0)
2015	Hapoel Ironi Baqa al-Gharbiyye	2	(0)
2015–2016	Ironi Tiberias	17	(0)
2016	Ihud Bnei Kafr Qara	6	(0)
2016–2017	Tzeirei Kafr Kanna	21	(1)
2017–2018	Hapoel Beit She'an	19	(1)
- * Club domestic league appearances and goals as of 1 June 2017

Naor Dahan (Hebrew: נאור דהן; born 26 September 1990) is a former Israeli footballer.
