= Sa'ar Benbenishti =

Israeli footballer

Sa'ar Benbenishti סער בנבנישתי
Personal information
- Full name: Sa'ar Benbenishti
- Date of birth: November 26, 1991 (age 34)
- Place of birth: Lod, Israel
- Position: Midfielder

Team information
- Current team: Maccabi Yavne

Youth career
- Hapoel Tel Aviv

Senior career*
Years	Team	Apps	(Gls)
2010–2012	Hapoel Rishon LeZion	21	(2)
2012–2013	Hapoel Bnei Lod	15	(2)
2013–2016	Hapoel Ra'anana	51	(2)
2016	→ Maccabi Netanya (loan)	10	(2)
2016–2017	Bnei Yehuda	7	(0)
2017	Hapoel Tel Aviv	10	(0)
2017–2018	Hapoel Ashkelon	19	(2)
2018–2020	Hapoel Katamon	23	(2)
2020	Maccabi Yavne	4	(0)
- * Club domestic league appearances and goals

Sa'ar Benbenishti (Hebrew: סער בנבנישתי) is an Israeli former footballer who played asMidfielder.
