= Nir Nachum =

Israeli footballer

Nir Nachum ניר נחום
Personal information
- Full name: Nir Nachum
- Date of birth: 2 September 1983 (age 43)
- Place of birth: Ashdod, Israel
- Height: 1.80 m (5 ft 11 in)
- Position: Attacking midfielder

Youth career
- 1999–2002: F.C. Ashdod

Senior career*
Years	Team	Apps	(Gls)
2001–2010	F.C. Ashdod	50	(3)
2002–2003	→ Hapoel Marmorek (loan)		
2003–2004	→ Maccabi Sha'arayim (loan)		
2004–2005	→ Sektzia Ness Ziona (loan)		
2005–2007	→ Hapoel Ashkelon (loan)		
2009	→ Beitar Jerusalem (loan)	13	(0)
2010–2012	Maccabi Netanya	64	(13)
2012–2013	Bnei Yehuda	6	(0)
2013	Hapoel Tel Aviv	9	(0)
2013–2015	Hapoel Rishon LeZion	63	(14)
2015–2016	Hapoel Ashkelon	27	(6)
2016–2017	Hapoel Bnei Lod	1	(0)
- * Club domestic league appearances and goals as of 1 June 2017

Nir Nachum (Hebrew: ניר נחום; born September 2, 1983) is an Israeli football player who plays as an attacking midfielder for Maccabi Ironi Sderot.

== Club career statistics ==
(correct as of October 2011)

Club	Season	League			Cup			Toto Cup			Europe			Total		
Club	Season	Apps	Goals	Assists	Apps	Goals	Assists	Apps	Goals	Assists	Apps	Goals	Assists	Apps	Goals	Assists
F.C. Ashdod	2007–08	20	2	3	0	0	0	4	0	0	0	0	0	24	2	3
Beitar Jerusalem (loan)	2008–09	12	0	1	0	0	0	0	0	0	0	0	0	12	0	1
F.C. Ashdod	2009–10	22	0	0	3	0	0	7	0	1	0	0	0	32	0	1
Maccabi Netanya	2010–11	30	7	6	4	1	1	3	0	0	0	0	0	37	8	7
Maccabi Netanya	2011–12	34	6	4	3	1	0	2	0	0	0	0	0	39	7	4
