= Izhak Nash =

Israeli footballer (born 1989)

Izhak Nash יצחק נאש Iицик наш
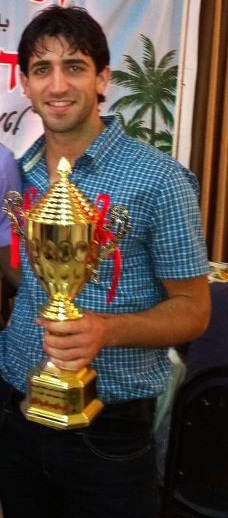

Personal information
- Full name: Izhak Arif Nash
- Date of birth: 23 June 1989 (age 37)
- Place of birth: Kfar Kama, Israel
- Position: Midfielder

Youth career
- until 2006: F.C. Kfar Kanna
- 2006–2007: Hapoel Tel Aviv

Senior career*
| Years | Team | Apps | (Gls) |
| 2007–2008 | Gadna Tel Aviv | 10 | (0) |
| 2008–2009 | Maccabi Herzliya | 15 | (2) |
| 2009 | Hapoel Bnei Tamra | 3 | (0) |
| 2010 | F.C. Kfar Kama | 14 | (4) |
| 2010 | Irony Said Umm Al Fahm | 2 | (0) |
| 2010–2012 | Maccabi Kafr Kanna | 54 | (22) |
| 2012 | Bnei Yehuda Tel Aviv | 2 | (0) |
| 2012–2013 | FC Ashdod | 10 | (0) |
| 2013–2014 | Hakoah Amidar Ramat Gan | 31 | (7) |
| 2014 | Hapoel Afula | 8 | (1) |
| 2015–2016 | Hapoel Baqa al-Gharbiye | 28 | (7) |
| 2016 | Hapoel Iksal | 11 | (1) |
| 2016–2018 | Hapoel Kafr Kanna | 53 | (10) |
| 2018 | Hapoel Asi Gilboa | 1 | (0) |
- * Club domestic league appearances and goals

Izhak Nash (Hebrew: יצחק נאש, Adyghe: Iицик наш— roughly, "'Itsik Nash"; born June 23, 1989) is a Circassian-Israeli football player.

== Career ==
Nash was born at the Circassian village Kfar Kama at the Lower Galilee and started to play football at the local club, F.C. Kfar Kama. He was raised and educated at the Hapoel Tel Aviv youth team, and later, he was transferred to Gadna Tel Aviv Yehuda. After one year at Gadna, he signed with the Maccabi Herzliya football club. However, an injury prevented from him from continuing with the team, and forcing him to move to lower leagues.

In the 2009–2010 season, he returned to his village and played for F.C. Kfar Kama, where he was one of the major players from the team to qualify for a league. A scout for Maccabi Herzliya, his old team, in Kfar Kama saw his performance and signed him back to the team. After a moderate performance in the first season, he scored 19 goals in the second season and was selected as the best player. In 2012, he signed with Bnei Yehuda Tel Aviv F.C. and become the second Circassian player ever at the Israeli Premier League (after Bibras Natcho). After a few months, he was transferred to F.C. Ashdod on loan. He is currently the only Circassian player at the Israeli Premier League.

Nash has made one appearance with Bnei Yehuda in the 2012–2013 UEFA Europa League.
