= Adi Soffer =

Israeli footballer

Adi Soffer עדי סופר
Personal information
- Full name: Adi Soffer
- Date of birth: January 21, 1987 (age 39)
- Place of birth: Herzliya, Israel
- Positions: Defensive midfielder; left back

Youth career
- Maccabi Herzliya

Senior career*
Years	Team	Apps	(Gls)
2005–2010	Maccabi Herzliya	39	(3)
2010–2011	Hapoel Afula	17	(5)
2011–2013	Hapoel Ashkelon	42	(4)
2013–2014	Maccabi Netanya	25	(0)
2014–2015	Hapoel Jerusalem	35	(3)
2015–2016	Hapoel Ramat Gan	17	(0)
2016	Hapoel Herzliya	7	(0)
- * Club domestic league appearances and goals

Adi Soffer (Hebrew: עדי סופר; born January 21, 1987) is a former Israeli footballer.

== Honours ==
- Liga Leumit
  - 2013-14
