= Arik Yanko =

Israeli footballer

Arik Yanko אריק ינקו
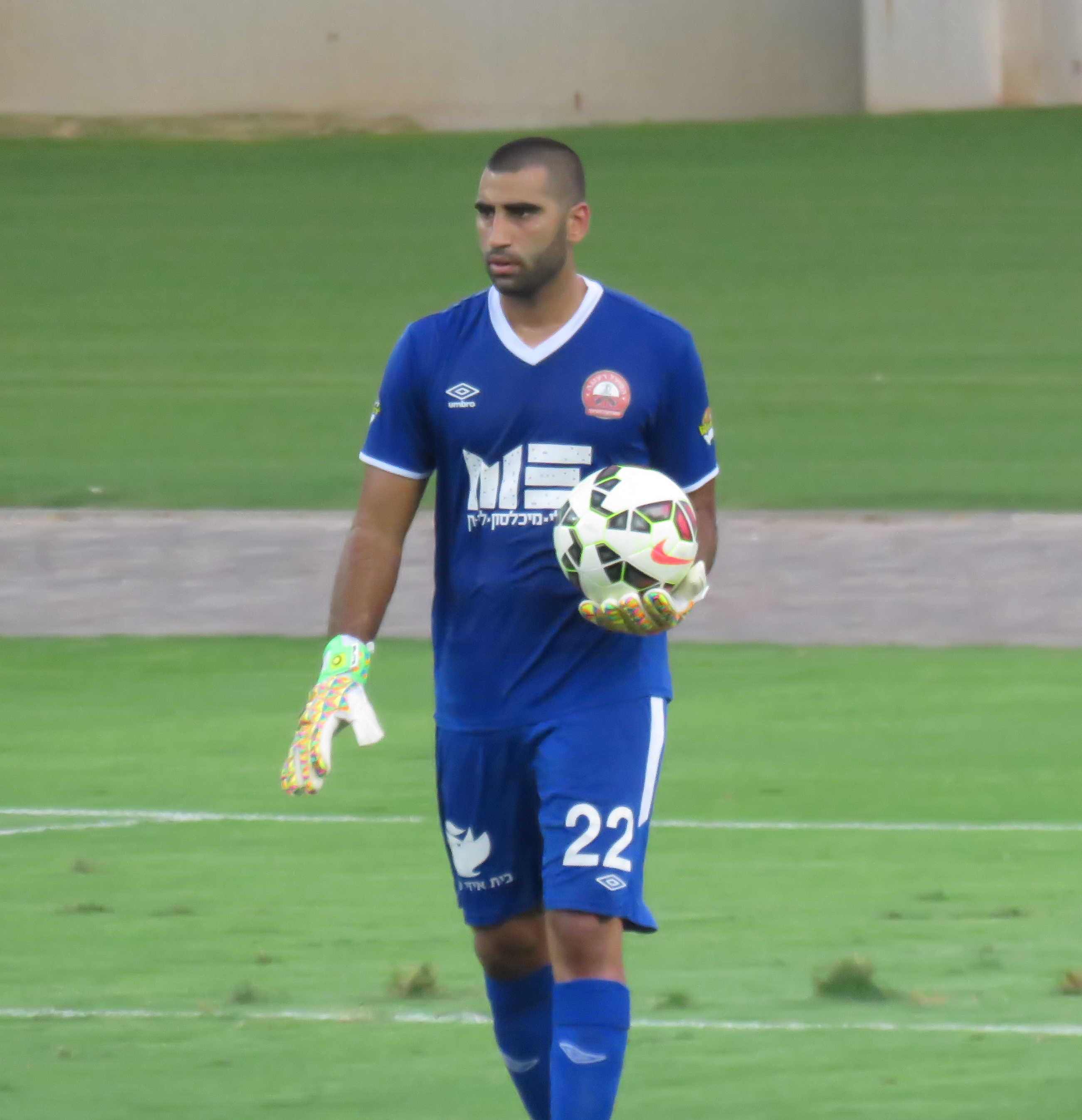
- Yanko playing for Hapoel Ra'anana in 2015

Personal information
- Full name: Arik Yanko
- Date of birth: 21 December 1991 (age 34)
- Place of birth: Rishon LeZion, Israel
- Height: 1.84 m (6 ft 1/2 in)
- Position: Goalkeeper

Team information
- Current team: Maccabi Jaffa

Youth career
- Hapoel Tel Aviv

Senior career*
| Years | Team | Apps | (Gls) |
| 2009–2014 | Hapoel Tel Aviv | 1 | (0) |
| 2011–2013 | → Hakoah Ramat Gan | 63 | (0) |
| 2013–2014 | → Hapoel Ra'anana | 13 | (0) |
| 2014–2017 | Hapoel Ra'anana | 68 | (0) |
| 2017–2020 | Hapoel Tel Aviv | 47 | (0) |
| 2020–2022 | Maccabi Petah Tikva | 66 | (0) |
| 2022–2023 | Maccabi Bnei Reineh | 29 | (0) |
| 2023–2024 | Hapoel Umm al-Fahm | 30 | (0) |
| 2024–2026 | Hapoel Rishon LeZion | 70 | (0) |
| 2026– | Maccabi Jaffa | 0 | (0) |

International career
| 2008 | Israel U17 | 2 | (0) |
| 2008–2009 | Israel U18 | 5 | (0) |
| 2009–2011 | Israel U19 | 9 | (0) |
| 2013 | Israel U21 | 0 | (0) |
- * Club domestic league appearances and goals as of 24 June 2026

Arik Yanko
Medal record

Representing Israel

Football

Maccabiah Games
| Bronze medal – third place | 2009 Maccabiah | Football |

Arik Yanko (Hebrew: אריק ינקו; born 21 December 1991) is an Israeli professional footballer who plays for Maccabi Jaffa.

== Biography ==
=== Playing career ===
Arik Yanko starting playing youth football with Hapoel Tel Aviv. As a youth team player, Yanko cracked four teeth during a derby match against Maccabi but played out the entire match. This endeared him to the youth team staff who saw the young goalkeeper as having a strong character.

Yanko made his league debut in a Premier League match against Maccabi Petah Tikva on 4 April 2009 when he replaced Ben Luz in the 80th minute after back up goalkeeper Yaniv Mizrahi was red-carded. In October 2009, Yanko said that that moment was by far the most exciting moment of his career.

==== International career ====
Yanko represented Israel at the 2009 Maccabiah Games, winning a bronze medal.

In 2013, Yanko was a part of Israel U21 squad.
