= Tarek Natour =

Israeli footballer

Tarek Natour طارق ناطور
Personal information
- Full name: Tarek Natour
- Date of birth: August 18, 1990 (age 36)
- Place of birth: Haifa, Israel
- Position: Goalkeeper

Team information
- Current team: Hapoel Asi Gilboa

Youth career
- 2005–2007: Maccabi Haifa
- 2007–2009: Maccabi Netanya

Senior career*
Years	Team	Apps	(Gls)
2008–2010	Maccabi Netanya	3	(0)
2010–2011	Hapoel Acre	0	(0)
2011–2012	Ahi Acre	11	(0)
2012–2013	Hapoel Kfar Saba	2	(0)
2013	Maccabi Ahi Nazareth	1	(0)
2013	Maccabi Ironi Kiryat Ata	0	(0)
2014–2015	Maccabi Sektzia Ma'alot-Tarshiha	13	(0)
2015	Hapoel Nir Ramat HaSharon	0	(0)
2015–2016	Beitar Nahariya	19	(0)
2016–2017	Hapoel Asi Gilboa	2	(0)
2017	Maccabi Sektzia Ma'alot-Tarshiha	4	(0)
- * Club domestic league appearances and goals as of 31 August 2015

Tarek Natour (Arabic: طارق ناطور, Hebrew: טארק נאטור; born 18 August 1990) is an Israeli footballer.

He began his career in the youth team of Maccabi Haifa and later on moved to Maccabi Netanya, promoted to the senior team during the 2008/09
