= Shlomi Ben Hemo =

Israeli footballer

Shlomi Ben Hemo שלומי בן חמו
Personal information
- Full name: Shlomi Ben Hemo
- Date of birth: December 5, 1978 (age 47)
- Place of birth: Rishon LeZion, Israel
- Position: Goalkeeper

Youth career
- Ironi Rishon LeZion

Senior career*
| Years | Team | Apps | (Gls) |
| 1996–2004 | Ironi Rishon LeZion | 14 | (0) |
| 2004–2005 | Hapoel Ashkelon | ? | (0) |
| 2005–2006 | Hapoel Petah Tikva | 1 | (0) |
| 2006–2007 | Ironi Rishon LeZion | 30 | (0) |
| 2007–2009 | Hapoel Ashkelon | 64 | (0) |
| 2009–2013 | Sektzia Ness Ziona | 113 | (0) |
| 2013 | Hapoel Kfar Saba | 15 | (0) |
| 2013–2014 | Hapoel Be'er Sheva | 0 | (0) |
| 2015 | Hapoel Azor | 4 | (0) |
| 2018–2019 | Hapoel Gedera | 3 | (0) |
| 2020–2021 | Agudat HaMakhtesh | 13 | (0) |
- * Club domestic league appearances and goals

Shlomi Ben Hemo (Hebrew: שלומי בן חמו; born 5 December 1978) is an Israeli footballer.
