= Amir Nussbaum =

Israeli footballer and manager

Amir Nussbaum עמיר נוסבאום
Personal information
- Full name: Amir Nussbaum
- Date of birth: October 9, 1980 (age 46)
- Place of birth: Rishon LeZion, Israel
- Height: 1.80 m (5 ft 11 in)
- Positions: Center back; left back

Team information
- Current team: Hapoel Rishon LeZion

Youth career
- Ironi Rishon LeZion

Senior career*
Years	Team	Apps	(Gls)
1998–2006	Ironi Rishon LeZion		
2001–2002	→ Beitar Shimshon Tel Aviv		
2002–2003	→ Maccabi Kiryat Gat		
2006–2010	Ironi Kiryat Shmona	114	(3)
2010–2013	Hapoel Ramat HaSharon	100	(6)
2013–2014	Hapoel Haifa	29	(0)
2014–2016	Hapoel Kfar Saba	68	(0)

Managerial career
- 2016–2019: Hapoel Be'er Sheva (assistant manager)
- 2019–2020: Hapoel Petah Tikva
- 2020–2021: Beitar Tel Aviv Bat Yam
- 2021: Ironi Kiryat Shmona
- 2021–2022: Hapoel Rishon LeZion
- 2022–2023: Hapoel Rishon LeZion
- 2023–2024: Maccabi Haifa (youth)
- 2024–: Maccabi Haifa (assistant manager)
- * Club domestic league appearances and goals

Amir Nussbaum (Hebrew: עמיר נוסבאום; born 9 October 1980) is a former Israeli footballer and now an assistant manager of Maccabi Haifa.
