= Hasiv Abu Rukon =

Israeli footballer

Hasiv Abu Rukon حسيب ابو روكون
Personal information
- Full name: Hasiv Abu Rukon
- Date of birth: February 11, 1991 (age 35)
- Place of birth: Isfiya, Israel
- Position: Striker

Team information
- Current team: Hapoel Daliyat al-Karmel

Youth career
- Maccabi Haifa

Senior career*
Years	Team	Apps	(Gls)
2010–2011	Maccabi Netanya	20	(0)
2012	Maccabi Ironi Bat Yam (loan)	16	(1)
2012–2013	Bnei Sakhnin	2	(0)
2013–2014	Hapoel Afula	13	(0)
2014	Ihud Bnei Majd al-Krum	7	(2)
2014–2015	Maccabi Ironi Kiryat Ata	22	(4)
2015–2017	Maccabi Daliyat al-Karmel	58	(18)
2017–2018	Hapoel Baqa al-Gharbiyye	20	(8)
2018	Hapoel Asi Gilboa	9	(1)
2018–2019	Hapoel Bnei Zalafa	18	(3)
2019–2021	Hapoel Bnei Fureidis	46	(36)
2021	Ihud Bnei Shefa-'Amr	10	(5)
2021–2023	Hapoel Tirat HaCarmel	20	(19)
2022	→ Tzeirei Umm al-Fahm	12	(6)
2022–2024	→ Tirat HaCarmel	23	(21)
2024	Maccabi Ahi Iksal	18	(8)
2024–2025	Tzofei Haifa	10	(15)
2025	Tzeirei Tmara	11	(7)
2025–	Hapoel Daliyat al-Karmel	9	(10)
- * Club domestic league appearances and goals as of 1 October 2025

Hasiv Abu Rukon (Arabic: حسيب ابو روكون, Hebrew: חסיב אבו רוקון; born 11 February 1991) is an Israeli footballer currently playing for Hapoel Daliyat al-Karmel.
