= Avi Strool =

Israeli footballer

Avi Strul אבי סטרול
Personal information
- Full name: Avraham Strul
- Date of birth: 18 September 1980 (age 46)
- Place of birth: Tel Aviv, Israel
- Height: 1.86 m (6 ft 1 in)
- Position: Center-back

Team information
- Current team: Hapoel Rishon LeZion

Youth career
- 1997–1999: Maccabi Tel Aviv

Senior career*
Years	Team	Apps	(Gls)
1999–2006	Maccabi Tel Aviv	126	(1)
2006–2008	Maccabi Netanya	53	(0)
2008–2010	Lokeren	48	(1)
2010–2013	Maccabi Tel Aviv	19	(1)
2013–2015	Ironi Nir Ramat HaSharon	43	(1)
2015–2019	Hapoel Rishon LeZion	74	(1)

International career^{‡}
2001	Israel U21	1	(0)
2002–2010	Israel	15	(0)
- * Club domestic league appearances and goals as of 1 June 2013 ‡ National team caps and goals as of 1 December 2009

Avraham "Avi" Strul (or Strool, Hebrew: אבי סטרול; born 18 September 1980) is a retired Israeli footballer who currently works as the CEO of Hapoel Rishon LeZion.

== Early life ==
Strul was born in Tel Aviv, Israel, to a Jewish family.

Being of Romanian-Jewish descent, Strul has two passports, Israeli and Romanian.

== Career ==
Strul grew up in the youth system of Maccabi Tel Aviv and spent 7 years there. During the summer of 2006 he transferred to Maccabi Netanya. After 2 successful years in Maccabi Netanya, Strool moved to Lokeren for a 3 years contract worth $750,000.

=== KSC Lokeren ===
In just his second game at Lokeren, Strul scored a memorable goal against A.F.C. Tubize, when he scored the second goal of the match, capitalising on a goalkeeper mistake to take a free-kick quickly and score from long range.

=== Maccabi Tel Aviv ===
In June 2010 Strul signed a 3-year contract with his youth club Maccabi Tel Aviv which he left 4 years before.

== Honours ==
- Israeli Premier League (2):
  - 2002–03, 2012–13
- State Cup (3):
  - 2001, 2002, 2005
