= Sean Malka =

Israeli footballer

Personal information
- Full name: Sean Malka
- Date of birth: April 27, 1993 (age 33)
- Place of birth: Bat Yam, Israel
- Position: Midfielder

Team information
- Current team: Sektzia Ness Ziona

Youth career
- Hapoel Tel Aviv

Senior career*
Years	Team	Apps	(Gls)
2012–2016	Hapoel Tel Aviv	23	(0)
2012–2013	→ Hapoel Petah Tikva (loan)	14	(1)
2015–2016	→ Hapoel Petah Tikva (loan)	5	(0)
2016–2017	Hapoel Rishon LeZion	47	(2)
2017–2018	Hapoel Ashkelon	21	(0)
2018–2019	Bnei Yehuda	12	(0)
2019	Maccabi Yavne	11	(1)
2019–2020	Hapoel Kfar Shalem	22	(2)
2020–2022	Hapoel Rishon LeZion	53	(7)
2022–2023	Hapoel Kfar Shalem	15	(2)
2023	Tzeirei Tayibe	4	(0)
2023–2024	F.C. Kafr Qasim	14	(0)
2024–	Sektzia Ness Ziona	0	(0)
- * Club domestic league appearances and goals as of 1 January 2024

Sean Malka (Hebrew: שון מלכה; born April 27, 1993) is an Israeli footballer who currently plays at Sektzia Ness Ziona.

== Career ==
Malka played in the youth of Hapoel Tel Aviv. In summer 2012 was on loan to Hapoel Petah Tikva and returned after the season to Hapoel Tel Aviv. On 22 September 2013 he made his debut in 1–3 victory against Maccabi Petah Tikva.

On 7 July 2015 signed again to Hapoel Petah Tikva after he released from Hapoel.
