= Oded Elkayam =

Israeli footballer

Oded Elkayam עודד אלקיים
Personal information
- Full name: Oded Elkayam
- Date of birth: February 9, 1988 (age 38)
- Place of birth: Haifa, Israel
- Height: 1.77 m (5 ft 9 1/2 in)
- Position: Right back

Youth career
- Hapoel Haifa

Senior career*
Years	Team	Apps	(Gls)
2006–2012	Hapoel Haifa	53	(0)
2011	→ Hapoel Ramat Gan (loan)	18	(0)
2011–2012	→ Bnei Sakhnin (loan)	34	(1)
2012–2013	Maccabi Haifa	5	(0)
2013–2017	Ironi Kiryat Shmona	112	(0)
2017–2019	Maccabi Petah Tikva	36	(0)
2019–2020	Hapoel Nof HaGalil	11	(0)

International career
2004–2005	Israel U17	10	(0)
2006	Israel U18	3	(1)
2006–2007	Israel U19	11	(0)
2007–2010	Israel U21	9	(0)
- * Club domestic league appearances and goals

Oded Elkayam (Hebrew: עודד אלקיים; born February 9, 1988) is an Israeli footballer.
