= Ben Zhairi =

Israeli footballer

Ben Zhairi בן צעירי
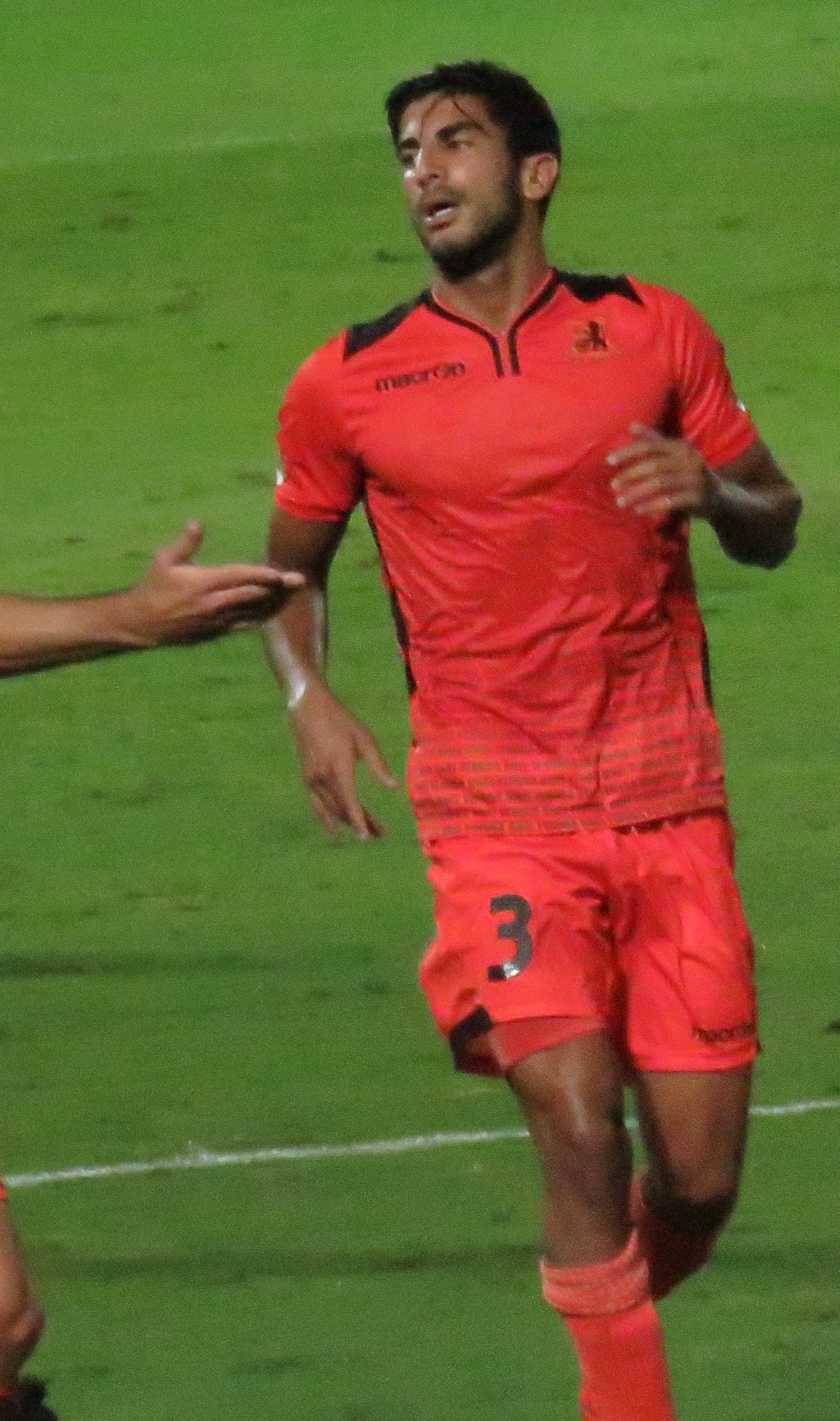
- Zhairi playing for Bnei Yehuda in 2015

Personal information
- Full name: Ben Zhairi
- Date of birth: 17 May 1992 (age 34)
- Place of birth: Magshimim, Israel
- Position: Left back

Senior career*
Years	Team	Apps	(Gls)
2011–2018	Bnei Yehuda	81	(1)
2013	→ Hapoel Kfar Saba (loan)	1	(0)
2013–2014	→ Hapoel Petah Tikva (loan)	32	(0)
2017–2018	→ Maccabi Netanya (loan)	7	(0)
2018–2019	Hapoel Ashkelon	13	(0)
2019–2020	Hapoel Umm al-Fahm	30	(1)
- * Club domestic league appearances and goals

Ben Zhairi (Hebrew: בן צעירי; born 17 May 1992) is an Israeli former footballer who plays as a left back.

== Honours ==
=== Club ===
Bnei Yehuda

- Israel State Cup (1): 2016–17
