= David Manga =

Central African footballer (born 1989)

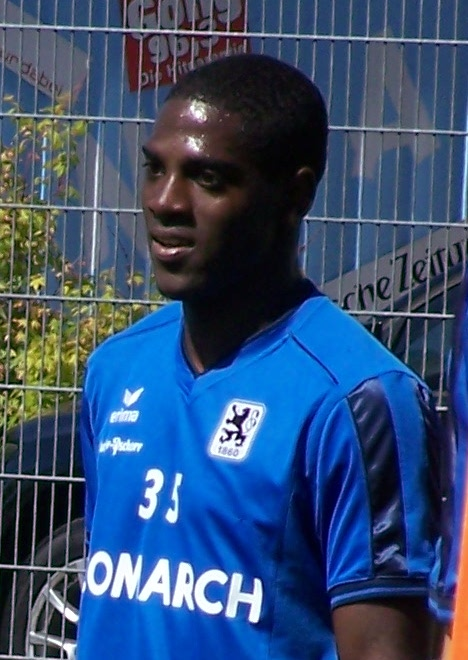
- Manga training with 1860 Munich in 2011

Personal information
- Full name: David Manga Lembe
- Date of birth: 3 February 1989 (age 37)
- Place of birth: Paris, France
- Height: 1.78 m (5 ft 10 in)
- Position: Winger

Youth career
- Paris Saint-Germain

Senior career*
Years	Team	Apps	(Gls)
2007–2008	SC Eisenstadt	3	(0)
2008–2011	1860 Munich II	74	(14)
2011	1860 Munich	0	(0)
2011–2013	Partizan	9	(1)
2012–2013	→ Hapoel Ramat Gan (loan)	31	(10)
2013–2016	Ironi Kiryat Shmona	55	(18)
2016	Târgu Mureș	0	(0)
2016	Beroe Stara Zagora	10	(2)
2017	Hapoel Ashkelon	13	(2)
2017–2018	Zira	13	(0)
2018	Hapoel Ashkelon	13	(1)
2018–2019	Levadiakos	6	(0)
2019–2020	FC Franconville	0	(0)
2020	Besançon	0	(0)
- AS Saint-Ouen-L'Aumône
2022	1. FC Kaan-Marienborn	0	(0)

International career^{‡}
2010–	Central African Republic	14	(2)
- * Club domestic league appearances and goals as of 1 July 2022 ‡ National team caps and goals as of 24 November 2017

David Manga (born 3 February 1989) is a Central African footballer who plays for the Central African Republic national team.

== Club career ==
Manga began playing in the Paris Saint-Germain youth academy. In 2007, he played with SC Eisenstandt in Austrian Regional League East.

In 2008, he signed a contract with TSV 1860 Munich and played three seasons for their second team in the German Regionalliga Süd. After 2010 he was a non-used substitute on several occasions at 1860 Munich main team, however he failed to make an appearance.

On 15 August 2011, after passing trial period and finishing medical exams, he signed with Serbian SuperLiga champions FK Partizan. He made his debut on 21 September 2011, in a 2011–12 Serbian Cup match against FK Novi Pazar, as a substitute of Saša Ilić in the 73rd minute. His league debut only happened on 22 October 2011, in the round 9 match against Javor with Manga entering in the 87th minute of the match. On 21 April 2012, he scored his first league goal in a shot after a long run in the 93rd minute of the 25th round match against Smederevo. He was a substitute at that match, when Avram Grant brought him into the game in 81st minute, a move which ended up being decisive as Manga was involved in the action of the first goal and scored the second in the 2–0 victory of his side.

In summer 2012 he joined Israeli Premier League side Hapoel Ramat Gan on a loan deal.

On 9 June 2017, Manga signed a two-year contract with Azerbaijan Premier League side Zira FK, but had his contract cancelled by mutual consent on 15 December 2017.

After returning to France and spending the 2019–20 season with French lower league side FC Franconville, Manga joined Championnat National 3 club Racing Besançon in June 2020.

Manga moved to fifth-tier Oberliga Westfalen side 1. FC Kaan-Marienborn from AS Saint-Ouen-L'Aumône in February 2022.

== International career ==
His debut for the Central African Republic national team was on 10 October 2010 in a match against Algeria for the 2012 Africa Cup of Nations qualification.

== Personal life ==
Born in Paris, France, David Manga's father was born in the Central African Republic and his mother is from Cameroon.

== Career statistics ==
=== Club ===
As of 18 June 2015

Appearances and goals by club, season and competition
Club	Season	League			National cup		League cup		Continental		Total	
Club	Season	Division	Apps	Goals	Apps	Goals	Apps	Goals	Apps	Goals	Apps	Goals
1860 Munich II	2008–09	Regionalliga Süd	17	2	–		–		–		17	2
1860 Munich II	2009–10	Regionalliga Süd	33	5	–		–		–		33	5
1860 Munich II	2010–11	Regionalliga Süd	24	7	–		–		–		24	7
FK Partizan	2011–12	Serbian SuperLiga	9	1	2	0	–		0	0	11	1
Hapoel Ramat Gan	2012–13	Israeli Premier League	30	10	1	1	5	4	0	0	36	15
Ironi Kiryat Shmona	2013–14	Israeli Premier League	29	11	0	0	5	3	–		34	14
Ironi Kiryat Shmona	2014–15	Israeli Premier League	26	7	3	0	3	1	–		32	8
Career total			170	43	1	1	5	4	0	0	184	52

=== International ===
Appearances and goals by national team and year
National team	Year	Apps	Goals
Central African Republic	2010	1	0
Central African Republic	2011	3	0
Central African Republic	2012	4	2
Central African Republic	2013	1	0
Central African Republic	2017	2	0
Central African Republic	2018	4	0
Total		15	2

Scores and results list Central African Republic's goal tally first, score column indicates score after each Manga goal.

List of international goals scored by David Manga
No.	Date	Venue	Opponent	Score	Result	Competition	Ref.
1	15 June 2012	Borg El Arab Stadium, Amreya, Egypt	Egypt	3–2	3–2	2013 Africa Cup of Nations qualification	
2	14 October 2012	Stade du 4 Août, Ouagadougou, Burkina Faso	Burkina Faso	1–0	1–3	2013 Africa Cup of Nations qualification	

== Honours ==
Partizan

- Serbian SuperLiga: 2011–12

Hapoel Ramat Gan

- Israel State Cup: 2013

Hapoel Ironi Kiryat Shmona

- Israel State Cup: 2014
