= Yaniv Lavi =

Israeli footballer and manager

Yaniv Lavi יניב לביא
Personal information
- Full name: Yaniv Lavi
- Date of birth: September 9, 1977 (age 49)
- Place of birth: Netanya, Israel
- Position: Defender

Team information
- Current team: Hapoel Ironi Kiryat Shmona (assistant manager)

Youth career
- –1997: Maccabi Netanya

Senior career*
Years	Team	Apps	(Gls)
1997–1999	Maccabi Netanya		
1999–2001	Hapoel Ra'anana		
2001–2002	Maccabi Herzliya		
2002	Hapoel Ramat Gan		
2002–2011	Hapoel Ironi Kiryat Shmona	216	(14)
2011–2013	Ironi Nir Ramat HaSharon	59	(1)
2013–2017	Hapoel Ra'anana	64	(0)

Managerial career
- 2016–2017: Hapoel Ra'anana (assistant manager)
- 2017–: Hapoel Ironi Kiryat Shmona (assistant manager)
- * Club domestic league appearances and goals

Yaniv Lavi (Hebrew: יניב לביא) is an Israeli former footballer and currently the assistant manager of Hapoel Ironi Kiryat Shmona.

== Honours ==
- Liga Artzit (1):
  - 2000–01
- Toto Cup (Leumit) (2):
  - 2007, 2010
- Liga Leumit (2):
  - 2006–07, 2009–10
