= Roei Beckel =

Israeli footballer

Roei Beckel רועי בקל
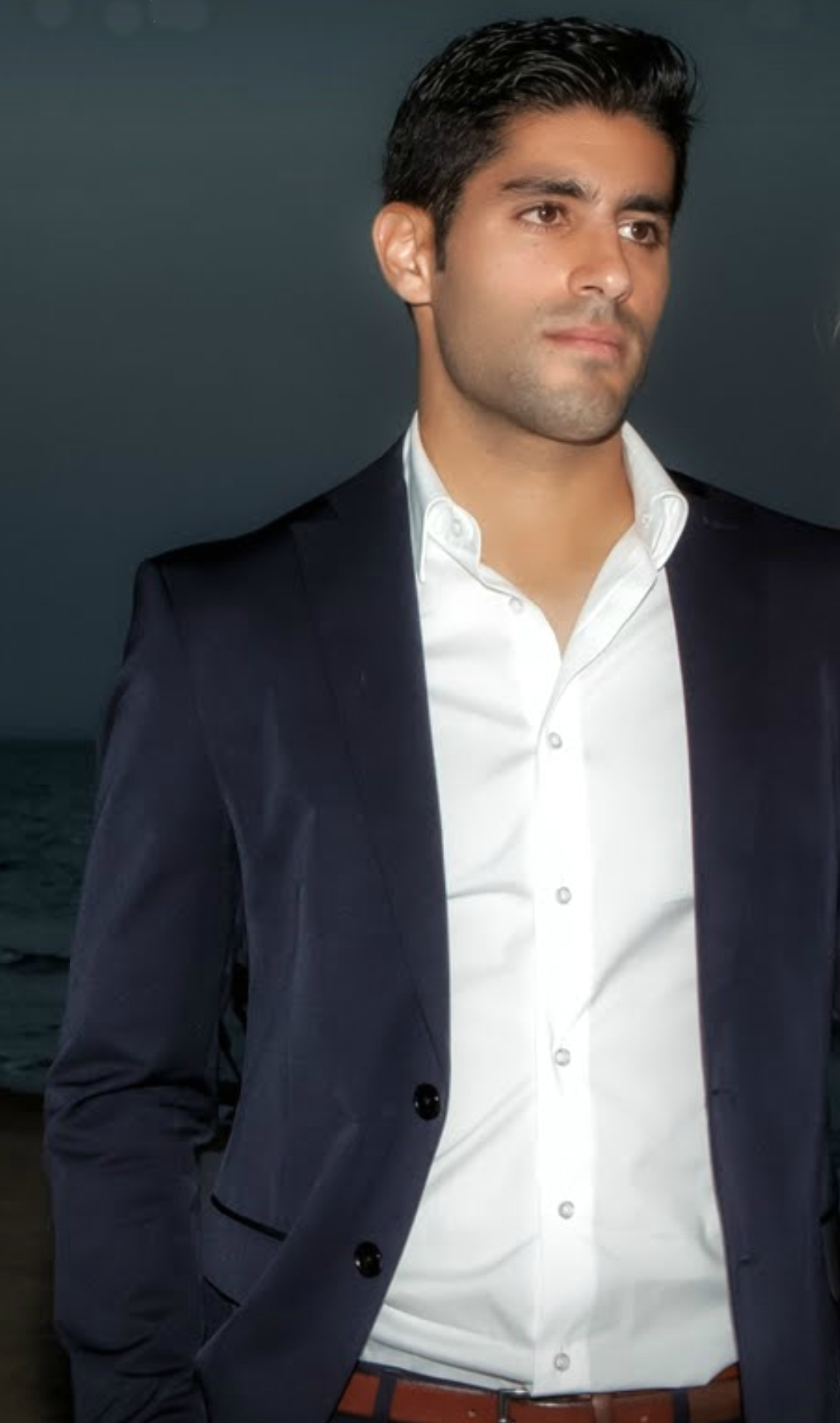

Personal information
- Full name: Roei Beckel
- Date of birth: October 7, 1987 (age 39)
- Place of birth: Petah Tikva, Israel
- Height: 1.85 m (6 ft 1 in)
- Position: Midfielder

Youth career
- Maccabi Petah Tikva

Senior career*
Years	Team	Apps	(Gls)
2006–2011	Maccabi Petah Tikva	42	(2)
2009–2010	→ Ironi Ramat HaSharon (loan)	26	(3)
2011–2013	Alki Larnaca	36	(4)
2013–2018	F.C. Ashdod	82	(6)

International career
2006	Israel U-19	7	(0)
- * Club domestic league appearances and goals

Roy Bakal (Hebrew: רועי בקל) is a former Israeli footballer, who played as a midfielder.

== Honours ==
- Liga Leumit: 2015-16
