= Eli Zizov =

Israeli footballer

Eli Zizov אלי זיזוב
Personal information
- Full name: Eliyahu Zizov
- Date of birth: January 30, 1991 (age 35)
- Place of birth: Beersheba, Israel
- Height: 1.78 m (5 ft 10 in)
- Position: Striker

Team information
- Current team: Nordia Jerusalem
- Number: 7

Youth career
- Beitar Nes Tubruk
- Maccabi Tel Aviv
- Levski Sofia

Senior career*
Years	Team	Apps	(Gls)
2006–2009	Levski Sofia	2	(0)
2009–2011	Braga	0	(0)
2011–2013	Maccabi Tel Aviv	8	(0)
2013–2015	Hapoel Acre	5	(0)
2015–2016	Maccabi Kiryat Gat	15	(0)
2017–2018	Nordia Jerusalem	21	(2)
2018–2019	Hapoel Bik'at HaYarden	5	(0)

International career
2007	Israel U19	5	(0)
2009–2011	Israel U21	2	(0)
- * Club domestic league appearances and goals

Eliyahu "Eli" Zizov (Hebrew: אלי זיזוב; born 30 January 1991) is an Israeli footballer.

== Early life ==
Zizov was born in Beer Sheva, Israel, to a Jewish family. He is of paternal Georgian-Jewish descent.

== Career ==
When he was six years old, he joined the Maccabi Tel Aviv academy. Zizov had briefly trained with FC Barcelona and was a target of Chelsea F.C., but eventually he joined Levski Sofia, with whom he has already played an official match in the A PFG: against PFC Rodopa Smolyan in April 2007 when he was 16 years, 2 month and 15 days old and thus he became the youngest foreign player making an appearance in the Bulgarian Championship.

Zizov decided to return to Israel, because he refused to sign a contract with PFC Levski Sofia, due to disagreements regarding his salary and playing opportunities.

In January 2010, he made his debut for the Portuguese side Sporting Clube de Braga senior team in a Taça da Liga game against U.D. Leiria.

On 3 July 2011, he signed with the Israeli side Maccabi Tel Aviv.

On 16 November 2013, Zizov signed with Hapoel Acre on a 3-year contract. Acre paid Maccabi 50,000 Shekels for the Israeli.

== Playing style ==
Zizov can play as a winger, striker or second striker.

== Honours ==
- A PFG (1):
  - 2008–09
