= Ben Ben Yair =

Israeli footballer

Ben Ben Yair בן בן יאיר
Personal information
- Full name: Ben Ben Yair
- Date of birth: December 23, 1992 (age 33)
- Place of birth: Beit Shemesh, Israel
- Height: 1.83 m (6 ft 0 in)
- Position: Winger

Team information
- Current team: Beitar Ramat Gan

Youth career
- Maccabi Tel Aviv

Senior career*
Years	Team	Apps	(Gls)
2009–2016	Maccabi Tel Aviv	2	(0)
2013	→ Hapoel Ramat Gan	3	(0)
2013–2014	→ Hapoel Ramat HaSharon	25	(1)
2014–2015	→ Maccabi Petah Tikva	6	(0)
2015	→ Hapoel Petah Tikva	8	(1)
2015–2016	→ Hapoel Ramat HaSharon	31	(8)
2016–2017	F.C. Ashdod	9	(0)
2017–2018	Hapoel Ramat HaSharon	32	(4)
2018–2020	Hapoel Bnei Lod	62	(14)
2021	Hapoel Petah Tikva	17	(1)
2022	Hapoel Bnei Lod	6	(1)
2025–	Beitar Ramat Gan	10	(3)
- * Club domestic league appearances and goals as of 1 May 2026

Ben Ben Yair (Hebrew: בן בן יאיר; born 23 December 1992) is an Israeli footballer who plays for Beitar Ramat Gan in the Liga Bet.

Ben Yair started his career at Maccabi Tel Aviv youth system. On August 27, 2012, he made his debut at the senior team 2–1 victory against Maccabi Haifa. In January 2013, he went on loan to Hapoel Ramat Gan and half a year later he moved to Ironi Nir Ramat HaSharon.

On June 29, 2014, signed to Maccabi Petah Tikva.
