= Tamir Kahlon =

Israeli footballer

Personal information
- Full name: Tamir Kahlon
- Date of birth: 29 October 1987 (age 39)
- Place of birth: Tel Aviv, Israel
- Height: 1.78 m (5 ft 10 in)
- Position: Midfielder

Youth career
- 2004–2007: Maccabi Tel Aviv

Senior career*
Years	Team	Apps	(Gls)
2006–2012	Maccabi Tel Aviv	29	(3)
2007–2009	→ Bnei Yehuda (loan)	44	(4)
2011	→ Charleroi (loan)	10	(3)
2011	→ Cracovia (loan)	7	(0)
2012	→ Ashdod (loan)	11	(0)
2012–2013	Hapoel Acre	29	(4)
2013	Ironi Kiryat Shmona	11	(4)
Total		141	(18)
- * Club domestic league appearances and goals

Tamir Kahlon (Hebrew: תמיר כחלון; born 29 October 1987) is an Israeli former professional footballer who played as a midfielder. Kahlon had to retire in 2013 following an injury while playing for Ironi Kiryat Shmona.

== Career ==
=== Club ===
In August 2011, he was loaned to Cracovia on a one-year deal.

In January 2012, he was loaned to Ashdod on six-month deal.
