= Beitar Tel Aviv Holon F.C. =

Israeli football club

Beitar Tel Aviv Holon
- Full name: Beitar Tel Aviv Holon Football Club
- Founded: 2000; 26 years ago as Beitar Shimshon Tel Aviv; 2011 as Beitar Tel Aviv Ramla; 2019 as Beitar Tel Aviv Bat Yam; 2025 as Beitar Tel Aviv Holon
- Ground: Bat Yam Municipal Stadium, Bat Yam
- Capacity: 2,800
- Chairman: Lior Shechter
- Manager: Erez Belfer
Home colours	Away colours

Beitar Tel Aviv Holon F.C. (Hebrew: מועדון כדורגל בית״ר תל אביב חולון) is an Israeli football club which represents Tel Aviv and Holon. It plays in the Liga Alef, the third level of Israeli football. Home matches are played at the Bat Yam Municipal Stadium.

== History ==
Beitar Shimshon Tel Aviv was formed in 2000 by a merger of Beitar Tel Aviv and Shimshon Tel Aviv. Both clubs were in Liga Artzit at the time of the merger, with the new club assuming a place in the league. In 2006 the club moved to Bnei Yehuda's Hatikva Neighborhood Stadium.

In 2008–09, the club finished sixth in Liga Artzit, and due to league restructuring, were promoted to Liga Leumit, the second tier.

In 2011, the club had his second merger, this time with Ironi Ramla, due to it, Shimshon retired from the union making the team changed its name to Beitar Tel Aviv Ramla.

On 22 May 2019, Ramla withdrew from the merge and the club merged with Maccabi Ironi Bat Yam, due to it, the club changed his name to Beitar Tel Aviv Bat Yam.

After the conclusion of the 2019–20 season, 12 players from Beitar Tel Aviv Bat Yam's roster went on to play in the Israel Premier League.

== Current squad ==
As of 7 February 2023

No.	Pos.	Nation	Player
1	GK	ISR	Avi Ivgi (Captain)
3	DF	ISR	Ido Krets
4	DF	ISR	Dan Lugasi
5	DF	ISR	Guy Kauffman
6	MF	ISR	Afek Sapir Navot
8	MF	ISR	Idan Sulimani
9	FW	ISR	Yoav Zur
10	MF	ISR	Diego Hananya
11	DF	ISR	Teddy Ahonam
12	DF	ISR	Teva Barret
13	FW	ISR	Meir Cohen
14	MF	ISR	Michael Mor
16	MF	ISR	Roy Peretz

No.	Pos.	Nation	Player
17	FW	ISR	Aner Shechter
18	MF	ISR	Omer Barami
19	MF	ISR	Aviv Palas
20	FW	ISR	Yuval Ben Kna'ana
21	MF	ISR	Roy Ezra
22	DF	ISR	Elad Koren
24	MF	ISR	Yonatan Offer
26	DF	ISR	Moshe Biels
27	DF	ISR	Liav Michaeli
28	MF	ISR	Shaked Amsalem
33	GK	ISR	Dvir Nir
99	FW	ISR	Yuval Sasson
—	DF	ISR	Idan Weitzman

== Former notable managers ==
- Rafi Cohen (born 1965)

== Crest history ==
Beitar Shimshon Tel Aviv logo from 2000 to 2011

Beitar Tel Aviv Ramla logo from 2011 to 2019
