= 2012–13 Hapoel Tel Aviv F.C. season =

Hapoel Tel Aviv
2012–13 season
- Owners: Haim Ramon
- Head Coach: Yossi Abukasis
- Stadium: Bloomfield Stadium, Tel Aviv
- Ligat Winner: 4th
- State Cup: Quarter-finals
- Top goalscorer: League: TBD; All: TBD
- Highest home attendance: TBD
- Lowest home attendance: TBD
Home colours	Away colours	Third colours

The 2012–13 season is Hapoel Tel Aviv Football Club's 85th years in the Israeli Football.

== Squad report ==
The team started the season with Nitzan Shirazi as coach. After finishing at the 2nd place the previous Ligat Winner season, Hapoel Tel Aviv Playning on Europe League.

== Transfers ==
The team so far signed Daniel Borcal, Roee Zachri, Hanan Maman, John Paintsil, Eric Djemba-Djemba, Bruno Coutinho, Eliran Danin, Zee'v Haimovich, Tal Ben-Haim,

Marko Suler, Mahran Lala and Bevan Fransman left the team from financial reasons. Omri Kanada was released from Hapoel Tel Aviv. Nosa Igiebor left for Real Betis.

== Current squad ==
As of 15 September 2012.

Note: Flags indicate national team as defined under FIFA eligibility rules; some limited exceptions apply. Players may hold more than one non-FIFA nationality.

No.	Pos.	Nation	Player
1	GK	ISR	Boris Klaiman
4	DF	ISR	Mor Shushan
5	MF	ISR	Hanan Maman
6	DF	ISR	Tomer Ben Yosef
7	DF	ISR	Eliran Danin
8	FW	ISR	Eden Shrem (eligible for youth team)
9	FW	ISR	Victor Merey
10	MF	ISR	Walid Badir (captain)
11	MF	ISR	Alroey Cohen
12	FW	ISR	Tal Ben Haim
13	MF	ISR	Nir Laks (eligible for youth team)
14	MF	ISR	Gil Vermouth
15	MF	ISR	Salim Toama
16	FW	ISR	Omer Damari

No.	Pos.	Nation	Player
17	DF	ISR	Ze'ev Haimovich
18	MF	ISR	Shay Abutbul
19	MF	CMR	Eric Djemba-Djemba
20	DF	ISR	Yigal Antebi
21	MF	ISR	Roei Gordana
22	GK	ISR	Ariel Talias
27	DF	ISR	Kfir Eizenstein (eligible for youth team)
29	DF	ISR	I'yad Hutba
30	GK	ARM	Apoula Edel
32	MF	BRA	Bruno Coutinho
44	DF	GHA	John Paintsil
55	DF	SRB	Nikola Petković
99	FW	ISR	Toto Tamuz

=== Players out on loan ===
Note: Flags indicate national team as defined under FIFA eligibility rules; some limited exceptions apply. Players may hold more than one non-FIFA nationality.

No.	Pos.	Nation	Player
—	GK	ISR	Galil Ben Shanan (at Hapoel Be'er Sheva until 30 June 2013)
—	GK	ISR	Arik Yanko (at Hakoah Amidar Ramat Gan until 30 June 2013)
—	DF	ISR	Yehuda Huta (at Sektzia Nes Tziona until 30 June 2013)
—	DF	ISR	Yaniv Azaria (at Hapoel Herzliya until 30 June 2013)
—	DF	ISR	Omri Cohen (at Beitar Tel Aviv Ramla until 30 June 2013)
—	DF	ISR	Daniel Borcal (at Ironi Nir Ramat HaSharon until 30 June 2013)
—	DF	ISR	Ben Bitton (at Bnei Lod until 30 June 2013)

No.	Pos.	Nation	Player
—	MF	ISR	Mahmoud Abbas (at Bnei Sakhnin until 30 June 2013)
—	MF	ISR	Itay Elkaslasi (at Ironi Nir Ramat HaSharon until 30 June 2013)
—	MF	ISR	Alex Basok (at Hapoel Herzliya until 30 June 2013)
—	MF	ISR	Moshe Denenbaum (at Maccabi Jaffa until 30 June 2013)
—	MF	ISR	Sean Malka (at Hapoel Petah Tikva until 30 June 2013)
—	MF	ISR	Arthur Atzianov (at Hapoel Ramat Gan until 30 June 2013)

=== Foreigners 2012–13 ===
Only up to five non-Israeli nationals can be in an Israeli club squad. Those with Jewish ancestry, married to an Israeli, or have played in Israel for an extended period of time, can claim a passport or permanent residency which would allow them to play with Israeli status.

- (Armenia) (Cameroon) Apoula Edel
- (Brazil) Bruno Coutinho
- (Ghana) John Paintsil
- (Cameroon) Eric Djemba-Djemba
- (Serbia) Nikola Petković

== Coaching staff ==
Position	Staff
General Manager	(Israel) Nitzan Shirazi
First-team manager	(Israel) Yossi Abukasis
Assistant manager	(Israel) Shavit Elimelech
Goalkeeper Trainer	(Israel) Yom-tov Talias
Fitness Trainer	(Israel) Dror Shimshoni
Equipment Manager	(Israel) Mordi Dadun
Club doctor	(Israel) Dr. Moshe Lweinkoff
Physio	(Israel) Ronen Tzafrir
Physio	(Israel) Gili Poterman
Head scout	(Israel) Ya'akov Hillel
President of Youth Department	(Israel) Meir Orenstein
Director of Youth	(Israel) Ze'ev Seltzer
Youth coach	(Israel) Morris Jano
Youth coach's assistant	(Israel) Rafi Samuel

Last updated: September 2012.
Source: Hapoel Tel Aviv F.C. Official Website

== Premier league ==
=== League table ===
Pos	Team	Pld	W	D	L	GF	GA	GD	Pts	Qualification
2	Maccabi Haifa	26	14	7	5	41	20	+21	49	Qualification for the championship round
3	Ironi Kiryat Shmona	26	11	10	5	34	25	+9	43	Qualification for the championship round
4	Hapoel Tel Aviv	26	12	6	8	33	29	+4	42	Qualification for the championship round
5	Bnei Yehuda	26	11	5	10	35	31	+4	38	Qualification for the championship round
6	Ironi Nir Ramat HaSharon	26	11	4	11	28	30	−2	37	Qualification for the championship round

Source: Israel Football Association
Rules for classification: 1st points; 2nd goal difference; 3rd matches won; 4th goals scored; 5th head-to-head; 6th decision match

=== Results by round ===
Round	1	2	3	4	5	6	7	8	9	10	11	12	13	14	15	16	17	18	19	20	21	22	23	24	25	26
Ground	A	H	H	A	H	A	H	A	H	A	H	A	H	H	A	A	H	A	H	A	H	A	H	A	H	A
Result	W	W	W	L	W	L	W	L	W	W	W	W	D	D	D	L	W	W	L							
Position	4	3	2	3	3	3	1	2	1	1	1	1	2	2	2	2	2	2	2							

Updated to match(es) played on 21 January 2013. Source: Israel Football Association
A = Away; H = Home; W = Win; D = Draw; L = Loss

=== Matches ===
26 August 2012 Day 1	Hapoel Ramat Gan	0 – 1	Hapoel Tel Aviv	Ramat Gan
20:10		Report	63' (pen.) Tal Ben Haim	Stadium: Ramat Gan Stadium; Referee: Alon Yefet

2 September 2012 Day 2	Hapoel Tel Aviv	2 – 0	Hapoel Haifa	Tel Aviv
20:10	Maman 26'; Damari 60' (pen.)	Report		Stadium: Bloomfield Stadium; Referee: Roi Reinshreiber

15 September 2012 Day 3	Hapoel Tel Aviv	2 – 0	Bnei Yehuda	Tel Aviv
19:00	Tamuz 40'; Damari 87'	Report		Stadium: Bloomfield Stadium; Attendance: 11,000; Referee: Eytan Tbryzy

22 September 2012 Day 4	Ironi Nir Ramat HaSharon	1 – 0	Hapoel Tel Aviv	Ramat HaSharon
20:10	Fernández 32'	Report		Stadium: Grundman Stadium; Referee: Eli Hacmon

29 September 2012 Day 5	Hapoel Tel Aviv	1 – 0	Bnei Sakhnin	Tel Aviv
20:10	Damari 20' (pen.)			Stadium: Bloomfield Stadium

22 October 2012 Day 7	Hapoel Tel Aviv	3 - 0	Maccabi Haifa	Tel Aviv
21:50	Ben Haim 35'; Damari 44'; Tamuz (yellow card) 71'; Haimovich (yellow card) 80'; Hutba (yellow card) 81'; Maman 90' (yellow card) 90'	Summary	Damahou (yellow card) 45'; Keinan (yellow card) 64'; Twatiha (yellow card) 71'	Stadium: Bloomfield Stadium; Referee: Eli Hacmon

29 October 2012 Day 6	Hapoel Tel Aviv	3 - 2	Beitar Jerusalem	Jerusalem
20:10	Ben Shushan 2'; Azriel 71', 76'	Summary	Ben Haim 39'; Tamuz 66'	Stadium: Teddy Stadium

4 November 2012 Day 8	Maccabi Netanya	2 - 1	Hapoel Tel Aviv	Netanya
20:50	Shumovich (yellow card) 26'; Saba'a 45+3'; El-Khatib 71'	Summary	Ben Haim (yellow card) 29'; Gordana (yellow card) 39'; Damari 63'; Maman (yellow card) 75'; Cohen (yellow card) 80'	Stadium: Netanya Stadium; Referee: Eytan Tbryzy

11 November 2012 Day 9	Hapoel Tel Aviv	1 - 0	Maccabi Tel Aviv	Tel Aviv
20:50	Haimovich (yellow card) 40'; Damari 80' (pen.) (yellow card) 80'; Tuama (yellow card) 83'; Merey (yellow card) 83'	Summary	Hasan Abu-Zaid (yellow card) 24'; Carlos García (red card) 48'; Ziv (yellow card) 79'; Gohouri (yellow card) 83'; Atar (yellow card) 83' (yellow-red card); Radi (yellow card) 88'	Stadium: Bloomfield Stadium; Referee: Alon Yefet

17 November 2012 Day 10	Hapoel Ironi Kiryat Shmona	0 - 1	Hapoel Tel Aviv	Kiryat Shmona
19:30	Gerzicich (yellow card) 36'; Tasevski (yellow card) 86'	Summary	Tamuz 3'	Stadium: Municipal Stadium; Referee: Asaf Kenan

26 November 2012 Day 11	Hapoel Tel Aviv	4 - 1	Hapoel Be'er Sheva	Tel Aviv
19:30	Gordana (yellow card) 40'; Ben Haim (yellow card) 52' (goal) 53'; Tamuz 55', 66', 74'	Summary	Swisa 58'; Osiako (yellow card) 69'; Falczuk (yellow card) 70'	Stadium: Bloomfield Stadium; Referee: Liran Liani

3 December 2012 Day 12	F.C. Ashdod	1 - 2	Hapoel Tel Aviv	Ashdod
20:50	Revivo 45'; Ofer Verta (yellow card) 46' (yellow-red card); Oshaniwa (yellow card) 52'; Israel Rosh (yellow card) 62'; Michael Siroshtein (yellow card) 84'	Summary	Tamuz 57'; Vermouth 82'	Stadium: Yud-Alef Stadium; Referee: Eitan Shmuelevich

9 December 2012 Day 13	Hapoel Tel Aviv	0 - 0	Hapoel Acre	Tel Aviv
20:15	Maman (yellow card) 44'; Tuama (yellow card) 82'; Badir (yellow card) 86'	Summary	Mishaelof (yellow card) 9'; Taga (yellow card) 12'; Lukman (yellow card) 83' (yellow-red card); Snir Mishan (yellow card) 90'	Stadium: Bloomfield Stadium; Referee: Berger Guy

15 December 2012 Day 14	Hapoel Tel Aviv	2 - 2	Hapoel Ramat Gan	Tel Aviv
19:15	Damari 14', 72'; Ben Haim (yellow card) 53'; Badir (yellow card) 57'; Hutba (red card) 80'	Summary	Arkhipov 42'; Itay Arkin (yellow card) 55'; Zaguri 82' (pen.)	Stadium: Bloomfield Stadium; Referee: Asaf Kenan

22 December 2012 Day 15	Hapoel Haifa	2 - 2	Hapoel Tel Aviv	Haifa
17:00	Nikolić (yellow card) 18'; Tzarfati 57' (pen.), 84' (pen.); Dora (yellow card) 60'; Roash (yellow card) 62'; Denković (yellow card) 90'	Summary	Tamuz 21'; Badir 25' (yellow card) 83'; Gordana (yellow card) 84' (yellow-red card); Merey (yellow card) 90'	Stadium: Kiryat Eliezer Stadium; Referee: Eitan Tbryzy

29 December 2012 Day 16	Bnei Yehuda	2 - 1	Hapoel Tel Aviv	Tel Aviv
17:30	Hrepka 12' (yellow card) 12'; Falah 53'; Azuz (yellow card) 57'; Marinković (yellow card) 76'; Ivaškevičius (yellow card) 86'; Edri (red card) 90'	Summary	Tamuz (yellow card) 41'; Antebi (yellow card) 55'; Shrem 89'	Stadium: Bloomfield Stadium; Referee: Liran Liani

5 January 2013 Day 17	Hapoel Tel Aviv	1 - 0	Ironi Nir Ramat HaSharon	Tel Aviv
18:00	Tuama (yellow card) 29'; Maman (yellow card) 79'; Damari 88'	Summary	Ben Shabat (yellow card) 16'; Abutbul (yellow card) 23'; Liran Katzav (yellow card) 32'; Roei Leibovich (yellow card) 65'; Amir Nusbaum (yellow card) 78'	Stadium: Bloomfield Stadium; Referee: Asaf Kenan

12 January 2013 Day 18	Bnei Sakhnin	0 - 3	Hapoel Tel Aviv	Sakhnin
19:15	Ottman (yellow card) 65'; Kasoum (yellow card) 73'; Kalibat (red card) 89'	Summary	Ben Haim (yellow card) 2' (goal) 52', 81'; Damari 7'; Danin (yellow card) 47'; Cohen (yellow card) 59'	Stadium: Doha Stadium; Referee: Eli Hacmon

21 January 2013 Day 19	Hapoel Tel Aviv	0 - 2	Beitar Jerusalem	Tel Aviv
20:50		Summary	Azriel 74'; Reikan 81'	Stadium: Bloomfield Stadium

27 January 2013 Day 20	Maccabi Haifa	TBD	Hapoel Tel Aviv	Haifa
20:50				Stadium: Kiryat Eliezer Stadium

Day 21	Hapoel Tel Aviv	TBD	Maccabi Netanya	Tel Aviv
				Stadium: Bloomfield Stadium

Day 22	Maccabi Tel Aviv	TBD	Hapoel Tel Aviv	Tel Aviv
				Stadium: Bloomfield Stadium

Day 23	Hapoel Tel Aviv	TBD	Hapoel Ironi Kiryat Shmona	Tel Aviv
				Stadium: Bloomfield Stadium

Day 24	Hapoel Be'er Sheva	TBD	Hapoel Tel Aviv	Be'er Sheva
				Stadium: Vasermil Stadium

Day 25	Hapoel Tel Aviv	TBD	F.C. Ashdod	Tel Aviv
				Stadium: Bloomfield Stadium

Day 26	Hapoel Acre	TBD	Hapoel Tel Aviv	Acre
				Stadium: Acre Municipal Stadium

== UEFA Europa League ==
=== Play-off round ===
23 August 2012 1st leg	F91 Dudelange (Luxembourg)	1 – 3	(Israel) Hapoel Tel Aviv	Differdange, Luxembourg
20:00	Joachim 20'	Report	Caillet 4' (o.g.); Ben Haim II 19' (pen.); Cohen 26'	Stadium: Stade Municipal de Differdange; Attendance: 937; Referee: Tommy Skjerven (Norway)

30 August 2012 2nd leg	Hapoel Tel Aviv (Israel)	4 – 0	(Luxembourg) F91 Dudelange	Tel Aviv, Israel
19:00	Maman 68', 84'; Merey 79'; Tuama 88'	Report		Stadium: Bloomfield Stadium; Referee: Hannes Kaasik (Estonia)

Hapoel Tel Aviv won 7–1 on aggregate.

=== Group stage ===
Pos	Team	Pld	W	D	L	GF	GA	GD	Pts	Qualification
1	(Czech Republic) Viktoria Plzeň	6	4	1	1	11	4	+7	13	Advance to knockout phase
2	(Spain) Atlético Madrid	6	4	0	2	7	4	+3	12	Advance to knockout phase
3	(Portugal) Académica	6	1	2	3	6	9	−3	5	
4	(Israel) Hapoel Tel Aviv	6	1	1	4	4	11	−7	4	

Source: Soccerway

20 September 2012 Day 1	Hapoel Tel Aviv (Israel)	0 – 3	(Spain) Atlético Madrid	Tel Aviv, Israel
19:00		Report	Rodríguez 37'; Costa 40'; Raúl García 63'	Stadium: Bloomfield Stadium; Attendance: 12,000; Referee: Pol van Boekel (Netherlands)

4 October 2012 Day 2	Académica (Portugal)	1 – 1	(Israel) Hapoel Tel Aviv	Coimbra, Portugal
21:05	Cissé 47'	Report	Gordana (yellow card) 60'; Badir (yellow card) 89'; Damari 90+2'	Stadium: Estádio Cidade de Coimbra; Attendance: 5,676; Referee: Stephan Studer (Switzerland)

25 October 2012 Day 3	Hapoel Tel Aviv (Israel)	1 – 2	(Czech Republic) Viktoria Plzeň	Tel Aviv, Israel
21:05	Maman 19'; Djemba-Djemba (yellow card) 32'; Hutba (yellow card) 54' (yellow-red card) 64'; Paintsil (yellow card) 85'	Report	Čišovský (yellow card) 33'; Horváth 45+1'; Rajtoral 55'; Kolář (yellow card) 75'; Řezník (yellow card) 90+4'	Stadium: Bloomfield Stadium; Attendance: 14,500; Referee: Felix Zwayer (Germany)

8 November 2012 Day 4	Viktoria Plzeň (Czech Republic)	4 – 0	(Israel) Hapoel Tel Aviv	Plzeň, Czech Republic
19:00	Kolář 23', 76'; David Štípek (yellow card) 32' (goal) 39'; Limberský (yellow card) 45'; Bakoš 84'	Summary	Djemba-Djemba (red card) 41'; Cohen (yellow card) 45'; Badir (yellow card) 67'	Stadium: Stadion města Plzně; Attendance: 11,389; Referee: Stanislav Todorov (Bulgaria)

22 November 2012 Day 5	Atlético Madrid (Spain)	1 – 0	(Israel) Hapoel Tel Aviv	Madrid, Spain
21:05	Raúl García 7' (yellow card) 29'; Rodríguez (yellow card) 78'	Summary	Paintsil (yellow card) 73'	Stadium: Vicente Calderón Stadium; Attendance: 10,000; Referee: Martin Hansson (Sweden)

6 December 2012 Day 6	Hapoel Tel Aviv (Israel)	2 - 0	(Portugal) Académica	Tel Aviv, Israel
19:00	Merey 56'; Hutba (yellow card) 64'; Maman 80'	Report		Stadium: Bloomfield Stadium; Attendance: 10,000; Referee: Aleksei Nikolaev (Russia)

== Toto Cup ==
=== Group B ===
5 August 2012 Matchday 1	Hapoel Tel Aviv	0 – 1	Maccabi Tel Aviv	Ramat Gan
20:45		Report	91' Eliran Atar	Stadium: Ramat Gan Stadium; Referee: Meir Levy

11 August 2012 Matchday 2	Maccabi Netanya	2 – 1	Hapoel Tel Aviv	Ramat Gan
20:45	50' Yossi Shivhon; 69' Omer Peretz	Report	52' Tal Ben Haim	Stadium: Ramat Gan Stadium; Referee: Roei Reinsreiber

18 August 2012 Matchday 3	Hapoel Tel Aviv	2 – 0	Bnei Yehuda	Ramat Gan
18:45	78' Eden Shrem; 81' (pen.)Tal Ben Haim	Report		Stadium: Ramat Gan Stadium; Referee: Alon Yefet

Pos	Team	Pld	W	D	L	GF	GA	GD	Pts
1	Maccabi Tel Aviv (A)	3	2	1	0	6	2	+4	7
2	Maccabi Netanya (A)	3	1	1	1	3	5	−2	4
3	Hapoel Tel Aviv	3	1	0	2	3	3	0	3
4	Bnei Yehuda	3	0	2	1	3	5	−2	2

Source: football.org.il (in Hebrew)
Rules for classification: 1st points; 2nd goal difference; 3rd matches won; 4th goals scored; 5th head-to-head; 6th decision match
(A) Advanced to the quarterfinals

== See also ==
- 2012–13 UEFA Europa League
- 2012–13 Toto Cup Al
