= 2011–12 Israeli Premier League =

Israeli Premier League
- Season: 2011–12
- Dates: 20 August 2011 – 12 May 2012
- Champions: Ironi Kiryat Shmona; 1st Premier League title 1st Israel title overall
- Relegated: Maccabi Petah Tikva; Hapoel Rishon LeZion; Hapoel Petah Tikva
- Champions League: Ironi Kiryat Shmona
- Europa League: Hapoel Tel Aviv; Bnei Yehuda; Maccabi Netanya
- Matches played: 296
- Goals scored: 749 (2.53 per match)
- Top goalscorer: Achmad Saba'a (20)
- Average attendance: 3,667

The 2011–12 Israeli Premier League was the thirteenth season since its introduction in 1999 and the 70th season of top-tier football in Israel. It began on 20 August 2011 and ended on 12 May 2012. Maccabi Haifa were the defending champions.

Ironi Kiryat Shmona secured the title with a 0–0 draw against Hapoel Tel Aviv on 2 April 2012. This was their first Israeli league title, This draw gave Ironi Kiryat Shmona a 16-point advantage over the second-place team Hapoel Tel Aviv with five more rounds to go.

== Structural changes ==
There was three structural changes:

- The middle playoff was cancelled, with only top and bottom playoff to be contested by eight teams each, according to their regular season placement. with each team plays 37 matches.
- The points were no longer halved after the regular season.
- There will be three relegated teams, and only one promoted team from Liga Leumit.

== Teams ==
Locations of the 2011–12 Israeli Premier League teams

A total of sixteen teams are competing in the league, including fourteen sides from the 2010–11 season and two promoted teams from the 2010–11 Liga Leumit.

Hapoel Ashkelon and Hapoel Ramat Gan were directly relegated to the 2011–12 Liga Leumit after finishing the 2010–11 season in the bottom two places.

Two teams were directly promoted from the 2010–11 Liga Leumit. These were champions Ironi Ramat HaSharon and the runners-up Hapoel Rishon LeZion.

Club	Stadium	Capacity
Beitar Jerusalem	Teddy Stadium^{[A]}	21,600
Bnei Sakhnin	Doha Stadium	8,500
Bnei Yehuda	Bloomfield Stadium	15,700
F.C. Ashdod	Yud-Alef Stadium	7,800
Hapoel Acre	Acre Municipal Stadium^{[B]}	5,000
Hapoel Be'er Sheva	Vasermil Stadium	13,000
Hapoel Haifa	Kiryat Eliezer Stadium	14,002
Hapoel Petah Tikva	HaMoshava Stadium^{[C]}	11,500
Hapoel Rishon LeZion	Haberfeld Stadium	6,000
Hapoel Tel Aviv	Bloomfield Stadium	15,700
Ironi Kiryat Shmona	Ironi Stadium	5,300
Ironi Ramat HaSharon	Grundman Stadium^{[D]}	4,300
Maccabi Haifa	Kiryat Eliezer Stadium	14,002
Maccabi Netanya	Sar-Tov Stadium	7,500
Maccabi Petah Tikva	HaMoshava Stadium^{[C]}	11,500
Maccabi Tel Aviv	Bloomfield Stadium	15,700

^A While Teddy Stadium was in renovation. Beitar Jerusalem hosted their home games in alternative stadia until the stadium was completed on 20 November 2011. Beitar chose to host its games in Ramat Gan Stadium.
^B Hapoel Acre played their first home game at the Ilut Stadium while their stadium was under construction.
^C The Petah Tikva Municipal Stadium was demolished. Hapoel and Maccabi Petah Tikva hosted their home games in alternative stadia until the new Petah Tikva Stadium was fully constructed in December 2011. Both Hapoel and Maccabi hosted its games in Ramat Gan Stadium.
^D Ironi Ramat HaSharon played their home games at the Winter Stadium until March 2012 while their stadium was under construction.

Beitar Jerusalem	Bnei Yehuda Hapoel Tel Aviv Maccabi Tel Aviv	Ironi Kiryat Shmona	Hapoel Acre
Teddy Stadium	Bloomfield Stadium	Kiryat Shmona Stadium	Acre Stadium
Maccabi Netanya	Hapoel Haifa Maccabi Haifa	Hapoel Petah Tikva Maccabi Petah Tikva	Hapoel Ramat HaSharon
Sar-Tov Stadium	Kiryat Eliezer Stadium	HaMoshava Stadium	Grundman Stadium
F.C. Ashdod	Bnei Sakhnin	Hapoel Be'er Sheva	Hapoel Rishon LeZion
Yud-Alef Stadium	Doha Stadium	Vasermil Stadium	Haberfeld Stadium

=== Managerial changes ===
Team	Outgoing manager	Manner of departure	Date of vacancy	Table	Incoming manager	Date of appointment	Table
Maccabi Petah Tikva	(Israel) Freddy David	End of contract	8 May 2011	7th (10–11)	(Israel) Marco Balbul	28 May 2011	Pre-Season
Hapoel Tel Aviv	(Israel) Eli Guttman	End of contract	25 May 2011	2nd (10–11)	(Israel) Dror Kashtan	4 June 2011	Pre-Season
Bnei Yehuda	(Israel) Dror Kashtan	End of contract	4 June 2011	4th (10–11)	(Israel) Yossi Abukasis	14 June 2011	Pre-Season
Beitar Jerusalem	(Israel) Ronny Levy	Resigned	10 June 2011	11th (10–11)	(Israel) David Amsalem	10 June 2011	Pre-Season
Beitar Jerusalem	(Israel) David Amsalem	Resigned	15 August 2011	Pre-Season	(Israel) Yuval Naim	17 August 2011	Pre-Season
Hapoel Petah Tikva	(Israel) Gili Landau	Resigned	16 August 2011	14th (10–11)	(Israel) Gili Landau^{[E]}	17 August 2011	Pre-Season
Hapoel Be'er Sheva	(Israel) Nir Klinger	Resigned	1 October 2011	14th	(Israel) Guy Levy	3 October 2011	14th
Maccabi Petah Tikva	(Israel) Marco Balbul	Resigned	15 October 2011	9th	(Israel) Eyal Lahman	18 October 2011	11th
Ironi Ramat HaSharon	(Israel) Momi Zafran	Sacked	13 November 2011	9th	(Israel) Meni Koretski (caretaker)	13 November 2011	9th
Hapoel Haifa	(Israel) Nitzan Shirazi	Resigned	26 November 2011	14th	(Israel) Tal Banin	27 November 2011	14th
Ironi Ramat HaSharon	(Israel) Meni Koretski (caretaker)	End of caretaker spell	5 December 2011	4th	(Israel) Yehoshua Feigenbaum	5 December 2011	4th
Maccabi Tel Aviv	(Israel) Motti Ivanir	Sacked	5 December 2011	9th	(Israel) Nir Levine^{[F]}	6 December 2011	9th
Hapoel Tel Aviv	(Israel) Dror Kashtan	Sacked	9 January 2012	3rd	(Israel) Ron Tziblin (caretaker)^{[G]}	9 January 2012	3rd
Hapoel Tel Aviv	(Israel) Ron Tziblin (caretaker)^{[G]}	End of caretaker spell	11 January 2012	3rd	(Israel) Nitzan Shirazi	11 January 2012	3rd
Maccabi Petah Tikva	(Israel) Eyal Lahman	Resigned	21 January 2012	12th	(Israel) Moshe Sinai	22 January 2012	12th
Hapoel Rishon LeZion	(Israel) Nissan Yehezkel	Sacked	29 January 2012	15th	(Israel) Eyal Lahman	30 January 2012	15th
Beitar Jerusalem	(Israel) Yuval Naim	Resigned	8 February 2012	12th	(Israel) Hanan Azulay (caretaker)	9 February 2012	12th
Beitar Jerusalem	(Israel) Hanan Azulay (caretaker)	End of caretaker spell	13 February 2012	12th	(Israel) Eli Cohen	13 February 2012	12th

^E Gili Landau refused to reduce his salary and was resigned, he was appointed the following day after his salary was intact.
^F Nir Levine was acted as caretaker manager for a month until his appointment as manager on 9 January 2012.
^G Ron Tziblin acted as caretaker manager only once, in the club Toto Cup Al semi-finals against Maccabi Petah Tikva.

=== Foreign players ===
Club	Player 1	Player 2	Player 3	Player 4	Player 5	Non-visa Foreign	Former Players
Beitar Jerusalem	(Argentina) **Darío Fernández**	(Brazil) **Leo**	(Nigeria) **Harmony Ikande**	(Ukraine) Andriy Pylyavskyi		(France) Steven Cohen^{2}	(Argentina) Miguel Portillo
Bnei Sakhnin	(Bulgaria) Kostadin Hazurov	(Democratic Republic of the Congo) Pieter Mbemba	(Ghana) Eric Gawu	(Ivory Coast) Joël Damahou			(Namibia) Miguel Hamutenya
Bnei Yehuda	(Argentina) Pedro Galván	(Lithuania) Kęstutis Ivaškevičius	(Nigeria) Dele Aiyenugba	(Serbia) Nenad Marinković	(South Africa) Dino Ndlovu		
F.C. Ashdod	(Democratic Republic of the Congo) Paty Yeye Lenkebe	(Nigeria) Efe Ambrose	(Zambia) Rodgers Kola				(Bulgaria) Georgi Hristov (Ghana) Samuel Yeboah
Hapoel Acre	(Cameroon) **Zome Louis**	(Serbia) Aleksandar Davidov	(Serbia) Nebojša Marinković	(Serbia) **Nikola Trujić**	(Serbia) Stefan Šćepović	(Argentina) Nicolás Falczuk^{2}	(Senegal) Mamadou Thiam (Serbia) Nikola Simić
Hapoel Be'er Sheva	(Bosnia and Herzegovina) **Nenad Kiso**	(Brazil) William Soares	(Colombia) Iván Garrido	(Montenegro) **Draško Božović**	(Montenegro) **Petar Grbić**	(United States) Ryan Adeleye^{2}	(Ghana) Laryea Kingston (Poland) Marcin Cabaj (Portugal) Luís Torres
Hapoel Haifa	(Croatia) **Marko Kartelo**	(Montenegro) Stefan Denković	(Montenegro) Vladimir Gluščević	(Serbia) **Dragan Ćeran**		(Croatia) Tvrtko Kale^{2} (Palestine) **Ali El-Khatib**^{3}	(Brazil) Zambi (Liberia) Amos Kollie (Slovenia) **Dejan Kelhar**
Hapoel Petah Tikva	(Brazil) André Caldeira	(Cameroon) Dominique Wassi	(Ghana) Daniel Addo	(Nigeria) Austin Ejide	(Switzerland) Fabian Stoller	(France) Jonathan Assous^{2} (France) **Kevin Parienté**^{2}	
Hapoel Rishon LeZion	(Ghana) **Imoro Lukman**	(Ivory Coast) Sindou Dosso	(Moldova) **Gheorghe Ovseanicov**	(Serbia) **Stefan Deak**	(Zambia) Justine Zulu		(Bosnia and Herzegovina) Elvis Mešić (Hungary) Marcell Illés
Hapoel Tel Aviv	(Armenia) Apoula Edel	(Croatia) Mirko Oremuš	(Nigeria) Nosa Igiebor	(Slovenia) **Marko Šuler**	(South Africa) Bevan Fransman		(Slovakia) Mário Pečalka
Ironi Kiryat Shmona	(Argentina) **David Solari**	(Serbia) Dušan Matović	(United States) Bryan Gerzicich	(Zambia) William Njobvu			
Ironi Ramat HaSharon	(Democratic Republic of the Congo) Alain Masudi	(Democratic Republic of the Congo) Savity Lipenia	(Serbia) Ognjen Damnjanović				(Brazil) Rômulo (Colombia) Óscar Guerrero
Maccabi Haifa	(Bosnia and Herzegovina) **Edin Cocalić**	(Croatia) **Danijel Cesarec**	(Croatia) Jurica Buljat	(Ghana) Seidu Yahaya	(Serbia) Bojan Šaranov	(Brazil) Gustavo Boccoli^{1}	(Ecuador) Marlon de Jesús (Georgia (country)) Vladimir Dvalishvili
Maccabi Netanya	(Croatia) **Ivan Ćosić**	(Moldova) **Serghei Alexeev**	(Suriname) Touvarno Pinas			(Ukraine) Leonid Krupnik^{2}	(Argentina) Mariano Caporale (France) Alexandre Martinović (Ukraine) Serhiy Tretyak
Maccabi Petah Tikva	(Cameroon) Justice Wamfor	(Croatia) Mario Carević	(France) Sébastien Sansoni	(Slovenia) Nastja Čeh	(Ukraine) **Ihor Malysh**	(Russia) Murad Magomedov^{3}	
Maccabi Tel Aviv	(Bosnia and Herzegovina) Haris Medunjanin	(Brazil) Nivaldo	(Croatia) Roberto Punčec	(Montenegro) Savo Pavićević	(Senegal) Moussa Konaté		

In bold: Players that join the club mid-season

In Italic: Players that left the club mid-season

The following do not fill a Visa position:
^{1}Players who were born and started their professional career abroad but have since gained an Israeli passport or permanent residency, allowing them to play with Israeli status;
^{2}Players who were born and started their professional career abroad but are eligible for Israeli citizenship due to Jewish ancestry;

^{3}Israeli citizens who have chosen to represent another national team;

== Regular season ==
=== Table ===
Pos	Team	Pld	W	D	L	GF	GA	GD	Pts	Qualification
1	Ironi Kiryat Shmona	30	19	9	2	42	15	+27	66	Qualification for the championship round
2	Hapoel Tel Aviv (Note: Hapoel Tel Aviv were deducted three points due to crowd riots in the match against Maccabi Tel Aviv.)	30	14	10	6	53	27	+26	49	Qualification for the championship round
3	Bnei Sakhnin (Note: Bnei Sakhnin were deducted two points due to double contracts with players and staff.)	30	14	7	9	49	35	+14	47	Qualification for the championship round
4	F.C. Ironi Ashdod	30	12	11	7	39	33	+6	47	Qualification for the championship round
5	Maccabi Netanya	30	13	8	9	44	40	+4	47	Qualification for the championship round
6	Maccabi Haifa	30	12	9	9	46	39	+7	45	Qualification for the championship round
7	Maccabi Tel Aviv	30	13	5	12	41	32	+9	44	Qualification for the championship round
8	Bnei Yehuda	30	11	10	9	38	27	+11	43	Qualification for the championship round
9	Hapoel Acre	30	10	8	12	41	37	+4	38	Qualification for the relegation round
10	Ironi Nir Ramat HaSharon	30	9	10	11	29	38	−9	37	Qualification for the relegation round
11	Beitar Jerusalem (Note: Beitar Jerusalem were deducted two points for racist taunts from the crowd.)	30	10	6	14	22	39	−17	34	Qualification for the relegation round
12	Hapoel Haifa	30	8	8	14	33	38	−5	32	Qualification for the relegation round
13	Hapoel Be'er Sheva	30	9	5	16	33	54	−21	32	Qualification for the relegation round
14	Maccabi Petah Tikva	30	7	9	14	31	50	−19	30	Qualification for the relegation round
15	Hapoel Rishon LeZion	30	6	9	15	34	54	−20	27	Qualification for the relegation round
16	Hapoel Petah Tikva (Note: Hapoel Petah Tikva were deducted nine points for entering administration.)	30	6	10	14	28	45	−17	19	Qualification for the relegation round

Source: Israel Football Association
Rules for classification: 1st points; 2nd goal difference; 3rd matches won; 4th goals scored; 5th head-to-head; 6th decision match

=== Results ===
Home \ Away	BEI	BnY	BnS	ASH	HAC	HBS	HHA	HPT	HRL	HTA	IKS	IRH	MHA	MNE	MPT	MTA
Beitar Jerusalem	—	2–1	0–3	1–0	3–1	0–1	1–0	1–2	1–1	1–1	1–0	0–1	1–4	2–1	0–0	0–0
Bnei Yehuda	3–0	—	1–1	1–0	4–1	5–1	1–0	5–1	1–0	1–1	0–1	1–1	0–0	1–2	2–2	0–0
Bnei Sakhnin	3–0	2–2	—	1–2	2–1	4–3	0–1	3–0	1–0	0–1	2–3	3–0	2–0	1–1	3–0	1–3
F.C. Ironi Ashdod	3–0	0–0	3–3	—	1–1	2–0	3–2	1–1	2–1	2–0	0–0	2–0	1–0	2–1	1–3	2–1
Hapoel Acre	1–1	2–0	2–1	2–2	—	2–0	1–0	3–1	2–2	0–2	1–2	2–0	0–1	1–2	0–0	3–0
Hapoel Be'er Sheva	0–1	3–1	0–2	2–1	2–1	—	2–0	1–2	2–1	1–1	0–3	1–3	1–1	1–2	0–0	1–4
Hapoel Haifa	3–0	0–2	1–2	2–2	2–4	0–2	—	2–2	3–2	0–0	0–1	2–0	1–1	1–1	1–1	2–0
Hapoel Petah Tikva	0–1	0–1	1–2	0–1	0–0	2–0	0–1	—	0–1	2–3	1–1	1–1	3–1	3–1	1–0	1–3
Hapoel Rishon LeZion	2–0	0–1	4–2	2–1	0–3	0–1	1–1	0–0	—	1–2	1–1	1–1	4–2	0–0	2–2	0–2
Hapoel Tel Aviv	1–0	1–1	0–0	0–0	2–1	2–0	0–0	5–0	6–0	—	2–2	0–0	3–0	7–3	4–1	0–1
Ironi Kiryat Shmona	1–0	1–0	0–0	0–0	2–0	1–1	1–0	2–0	2–0	1–0	—	4–0	1–0	1–3	1–1	2–1
Ironi Nir Ramat HaSharon	2–0	2–1	0–1	1–1	1–1	3–3	2–0	0–0	1–2	1–1	0–1	—	0–0	0–1	0–1	3–1
Maccabi Haifa	1–0	1–1	0–0	1–1	1–0	3–1	1–3	2–2	3–1	1–4	0–3	5–0	—	2–1	4–1	2–1
Maccabi Netanya	1–1	1–0	3–1	1–0	1–1	2–1	1–1	1–1	6–2	2–1	0–1	0–2	1–4	—	0–1	3–0
Maccabi Petah Tikva	2–3	1–0	1–3	2–3	0–4	1–2	2–1	1–1	2–2	1–0	0–2	2–3	1–4	0–1	—	2–1
Maccabi Tel Aviv	0–1	0–1	2–0	4–0	2–0	4–0	2–0	1–0	3–1	1–3	1–1	0–1	1–1	1–1	1–0	—

Source: Israel Football Association
Legend: Blue = home team win; Yellow = draw; Red = away team win.

== Playoffs ==
Key numbers for pairing determination (number marks position after 30 games):

Rounds
31st	32nd	33rd	34th	35th	36th	37th
1 – 8; 2 – 7; 3 – 6; 4 – 5	1 – 2; 6 – 4; 7 – 3; 8 – 5	2 – 8; 3 – 1; 4 – 7; 5 – 6	1 – 4; 2 – 3; 7 – 5; 8 – 6	3 – 8; 4 – 2; 5 – 1; 6 – 7	1 – 6; 2 – 5; 3 – 4; 8 – 7	4 – 8; 5 – 3; 6 – 2; 7 – 1
9 – 16; 10 – 15; 11 – 14; 12 – 13	9 – 10; 14 – 12; 15 – 11; 16 – 13	10 – 16; 11 – 9; 12 – 15; 13 – 14	9 – 12; 10 – 11; 15 – 13; 16 – 14	11 – 16; 12 – 10; 13 – 9; 14 – 15	9 – 14; 10 – 13; 11 – 12; 16 – 15	12 – 16; 13 – 11; 14 – 10; 15 – 9

=== Top playoff ===
==== Table ====
Pos	Team	Pld	W	D	L	GF	GA	GD	Pts	Qualification
1	Ironi Kiryat Shmona (C)	37	21	10	6	48	26	+22	73	Qualification for the Champions League second qualifying round
2	Hapoel Tel Aviv (Note: Hapoel Tel Aviv were deducted three points due to crowd riots in the match against Maccabi Tel Aviv.)	37	16	14	7	63	35	+28	59	Qualification for the Europa League play-off round (Note: Hapoel Tel Aviv qualified for the play-off round of the 2012–13 UEFA Europa League after winning the 2011–12 Israel State Cup. As they finished second, the fourth-placed team of the league also qualified for the Europa League.)
3	Bnei Yehuda	37	16	11	10	53	36	+17	59	Qualification for the Europa League second qualifying round
4	Maccabi Netanya	37	17	8	12	54	48	+6	59	Qualification for the Europa League second qualifying round
5	Maccabi Haifa	37	16	10	11	56	44	+12	58	
6	Maccabi Tel Aviv	37	16	7	14	55	43	+12	55	
7	F.C. Ironi Ashdod	37	14	12	11	44	44	0	54	
8	Bnei Sakhnin (Note: Bnei Sakhnin were deducted two points due to double contracts with players and staff.)	37	15	7	15	60	53	+7	50	

Source: Israel Football Association
Rules for classification: 1st points; 2nd goal difference; 3rd matches won; 4th goals scored; 5th head-to-head; 6th decision match
(C) Champions

==== Results ====
Home \ Away	BnY	BnS	ASH	HTA	IKS	MHA	MNE	MTA
Bnei Yehuda	—	—	—	—	—	2–1	1–0	4–3
Bnei Sakhnin	0–3	—	1–2	—	5–0	0–2	—	—
F.C. Ironi Ashdod	2–1	—	—	0–2	—	—	0–2	1–1
Hapoel Tel Aviv	3–3	3–1	—	—	—	—	1–3	0–0
Ironi Kiryat Shmona	0–1	—	1–0	0–0	—	0–1	—	—
Maccabi Haifa	—	—	3–0	1–1	—	—	—	2–1
Maccabi Netanya	—	3–2	—	—	1–3	1–0	—	—
Maccabi Tel Aviv	—	5–2	—	—	3–2	—	1–0	—

Source: Israel Football Association
Legend: Blue = home team win; Yellow = draw; Red = away team win.

=== Bottom playoff ===
==== Table ====
Pos	Team	Pld	W	D	L	GF	GA	GD	Pts	Relegation
9	Beitar Jerusalem (Note: Beitar Jerusalem were deducted two points for racist taunts from the crowd.)	37	15	7	15	32	44	−12	50	
10	Hapoel Acre	37	13	9	15	51	45	+6	48	
11	Ironi Nir Ramat HaSharon	37	11	13	13	37	45	−8	46	
12	Hapoel Haifa	37	11	11	15	41	43	−2	44	
13	Hapoel Be'er Sheva	37	12	7	18	41	61	−20	43	
14	Maccabi Petah Tikva (Note: Maccabi Petah Tikva were deducted three points after the team staff headbutted and kicked Hapoel Haifa player Ali El-Khatib after the match.) (R)	37	11	10	16	39	57	−18	40	Relegation to Liga Leumit
15	Hapoel Rishon LeZion (R)	37	6	9	22	39	70	−31	27	Relegation to Liga Leumit
16	Hapoel Petah Tikva (Note: Hapoel Petah Tikva were deducted nine points for entering administration.) (R)	37	8	11	18	36	55	−19	26	Relegation to Liga Leumit

Source: Israel Football Association
Rules for classification: 1st points; 2nd goal difference; 3rd matches won; 4th goals scored; 5th head-to-head; 6th decision match
(R) Relegated

==== Results ====
Home \ Away	BEI	HAC	HBS	HHA	HPT	HRL	IRH	MPT
Beitar Jerusalem	—	1–0	—	0–0	2–0	—	—	3–1
Hapoel Acre	—	—	—	0–0	2–3	—	2–0	1–2
Hapoel Be'er Sheva	3–1	1–3	—	—	—	—	—	1–0
Hapoel Haifa	—	—	2–1	—	2–1	2–0	1–1	—
Hapoel Petah Tikva	—	—	1–1	—	—	2–0	—	0–1
Hapoel Rishon LeZion	1–2	1–2	0–1	—	—	—	—	—
Ironi Nir Ramat HaSharon	0–1	—	0–0	—	2–1	5–2	—	—
Maccabi Petah Tikva	—	—	—	2–1	—	2–1	0–0	—

Source: Israel Football Association
Legend: Blue = home team win; Yellow = draw; Red = away team win.

== Top goalscorers ==
Rank	Scorer	Club	Goals
1	(Israel) Achmad Saba'a	Maccabi Netanya	20
2	(Israel) Omer Damari	Hapoel Tel Aviv	17
3	(Argentina) Pedro Galván	Bnei Yehuda	16
4	(Bulgaria) Kostadin Hazurov	Bnei Sakhnin	14
4	(Israel) Wiyam Amashe	Maccabi Haifa	14
6	(Israel) Yuval Avidor	Ironi Kiryat Shmona / Hapoel Haifa	13
6	(Israel) Shimon Abuhatzira	Ironi Kiryat Shmona	13
6	(Israel) Toto Tamuz	Hapoel Tel Aviv	13
6	(Israel) Maharan Radi	Bnei Sakhnin	13
6	(Israel) Eliran Atar	Maccabi Tel Aviv	13
Total			749
Average per game			2.53

Source: Israel Football Association
- ^1 Yuval Avidor was loaned to Hapoel Haifa from Ironi Kiryat Shmona on 20 September 2011. Avidor played three games for Kiryat Shmona and did not score.

== Season statistics ==
=== Scoring ===
- First goal of the season: (Israel) Firas Mugrabi for Maccabi Netanya against Maccabi Haifa, 21st minute (20 August 2011)
- Widest winning margin: 6 goals – Hapoel Tel Aviv 6–0 Hapoel Rishon LeZion (29 October 2011)
- Most goals in a match: 10 goals – Hapoel Tel Aviv 7–3 Maccabi Netanya (21 January 2012)
- Most goals in a half: 5 goals –
  - Bnei Yehuda 4–1 Hapoel Acre, 0–0 at half-time (17 December 2011)
  - Bnei Yehuda 5–1 Hapoel Petah Tikva, 1–0 at half-time (7 January 2012)
  - Hapoel Tel Aviv 7–3 Maccabi Netanya (both halves), 3–2 at half-time (21 January 2012)
  - Maccabi Tel Aviv 5–2 Bnei Sakhnin, 5–0 at half-time (31 March 2012)
- Most goals in a match by one player: 4 goals – Wiyam Amashe for Maccabi Haifa against Maccabi Netanya (20 August 2011)
- Most goals scored by a losing team: 3 goals
  - Bnei Sakhnin 4–3 Hapoel Be'er Sheva (27 August 2011)
  - Hapoel Tel Aviv 7–3 Maccabi Netanya (21 January 2012)
  - Bnei Yehuda 4–3 Maccabi Tel Aviv (9 May 2012)

=== Discipline ===
- First yellow card of the season: (Israel) Mohammad Ghadir for Maccabi Haifa against Maccabi Netanya, 40th minute (20 August 2011)
- First red card of the season: (Israel) Eyal Tartazky for Hapoel Haifa against Ironi Kiryat Shmona, 68th minute (20 August 2011)

== See also ==
- 2011–12 Israel State Cup
- 2011–12 Toto Cup Al
