= List of Israeli football transfers summer 2012 =

This is a list of Israeli football transfers in the 2012 summer transfer window by each club.

== Israeli Premier league ==
=== Beitar Jerusalem ===
In: Note: Flags indicate national team as defined under FIFA eligibility rules; some limited exceptions apply. Players may hold more than one non-FIFA nationality.

No.	Pos.	Nation	Player
—	DF	ISR	Haim Megrelashvili (on loan from (Israel) Maccabi Haifa)
—	FW	ISR	Hen Azriel (on loan from (Israel) Maccabi Haifa)

Out: Note: Flags indicate national team as defined under FIFA eligibility rules; some limited exceptions apply. Players may hold more than one non-FIFA nationality.

No.	Pos.	Nation	Player
—	FW	BRA	Leonardo Pasos (to (Israel) Hapoel Acco)
—	DF	ISR	Tomer Ben Yosef (to (Israel) Hapoel Tel Aviv)
—	MF	ISR	Dan Einbinder (to (Israel) Ironi Kiryat Shmona)
—	MF	ISR	Steven Cohen (to (Belgium) Waasland-Beveren)
—	MF	NGA	Harmony Ikande (on loan to (Portugal) Sporting B)
—	DF	UKR	Andriy Pylyavskyi (loan return to (Israel) Maccabi Haifa)
—	DF	ISR	Haim Megrelashvili (loan return to (Israel) Maccabi Haifa)

=== Bnei Sakhnin ===
In: Note: Flags indicate national team as defined under FIFA eligibility rules; some limited exceptions apply. Players may hold more than one non-FIFA nationality.

No.	Pos.	Nation	Player
—	DF	ISR	Shimon Harush (from (Israel) Hapoel Be'er Sheva)
—	DF	ISR	Ali Ottman (on loan from (Israel) Maccabi Haifa)
—	FW	ISR	Mohammed Kalibat (on loan from (Israel) Maccabi Haifa)
—	DF	SRB	Aleksandar Davidov (on loan from (Serbia) Partizan)
—	MF	ISR	Mahmoud Abbas (on loan from (Israel) Hapoel Tel Aviv F.C.)
—	MF	ISR	Liran Cohen (loan return from (Poland) Podbeskidzie)

Out: Note: Flags indicate national team as defined under FIFA eligibility rules; some limited exceptions apply. Players may hold more than one non-FIFA nationality.

No.	Pos.	Nation	Player
—	FW	BUL	Kostadin Hazurov (To (Belgium) Lierse)
—	DF	ISR	Ori Shitrit (to (Israel) Maccabi Netanya)
—	MF	ISR	Maharan Radi (To (Israel) Maccabi Tel Aviv)
—	DF	ISR	Oded Elkayam (loan return to (Israel) Hapoel Haifa)
—	MF	ISR	Liran Cohen (to (Poland) Podbeskidzie)

=== Bnei Yehuda Tel Aviv ===
In: Note: Flags indicate national team as defined under FIFA eligibility rules; some limited exceptions apply. Players may hold more than one non-FIFA nationality.

No.	Pos.	Nation	Player
—	FW	ISR	Nir Nachum (from (Israel) Maccabi Netanya)
—	FW	ISR	Orr Barouch (from (United States) Chicago Fire)
—	MF	ISR	Nes Zamir (from (Israel) Maccabi Petah Tikva)
—	DF	ISR	Sari Falah (on loan from (Israel) Maccabi Haifa)
—	MF	ISR	Ruslan Breski (on loan from (Israel) Maccabi Tel Aviv)

Out: Note: Flags indicate national team as defined under FIFA eligibility rules; some limited exceptions apply. Players may hold more than one non-FIFA nationality.

No.	Pos.	Nation	Player
—	MF	ISR	Yisrael Zaguri (loan return to (Israel) Maccabi Haifa)
—	FW	RSA	Dino Ndlovu (to (Israel) Maccabi Haifa)
—	DF	ISR	Dan Mori (to (Netherlands) Vitesse Arnhem)
—	MF	ISR	Hasan Abu Zaid (to (Israel) Maccabi Tel Aviv)

=== F.C. Ashdod ===
In: Note: Flags indicate national team as defined under FIFA eligibility rules; some limited exceptions apply. Players may hold more than one non-FIFA nationality.

No.	Pos.	Nation	Player
—	MF	ISR	Idan Sade (loan return from (Cyprus) Enosis Neon Paralimni)
—	FW	ISR	Murad Abu Anza (from (Israel) Bnei Lod)
—	FW	BUL	Dimitar Makriev (from (Ukraine) Oleksandriya)
—	DF	NGA	Juwon Oshaniwa (from (Nigeria) Sharks)

Out: Note: Flags indicate national team as defined under FIFA eligibility rules; some limited exceptions apply. Players may hold more than one non-FIFA nationality.

No.	Pos.	Nation	Player
—	FW	ZAM	Rodgers Kola (To (Belgium) Gent)
—	FW	ISR	Idan Shriki (To (Israel) Maccabi Netanya)
—	DF	NGA	Efe Ambrose (To (Scotland) Celtic)
—	MF	ISR	Idan Sade (To (Israel) Hapoel Bnei Lod)
—	MF	ISR	Ran Ben Shimon (To (Israel) Hapoel Bnei Lod)
—	FW	ISR	Nevo Mizrahi (To (Israel) Hapoel Bnei Lod)

=== Hapoel Acre ===
In: Note: Flags indicate national team as defined under FIFA eligibility rules; some limited exceptions apply. Players may hold more than one non-FIFA nationality.

No.	Pos.	Nation	Player
—	MF	GHA	Imoro Lukman (from (Israel) Rishon LeZion)
—	FW	BRA	Leonardo Pasos (from (Israel) Beitar Jerusalem)
—	FW	BRA	David Gomez (from (Israel) Rishon LeZion)

Out: Note: Flags indicate national team as defined under FIFA eligibility rules; some limited exceptions apply. Players may hold more than one non-FIFA nationality.

No.	Pos.	Nation	Player
—	FW	SRB	Stefan Šćepović (to (Serbia) Partizan)
—	FW	SRB	Nikola Trujic (to (Serbia) Teleoptik)
—	DF	ISR	Eliran Danin (to (Israel) Hapoel Tel Aviv)
—	DF	SRB	Aleksandar Davidov (loan return to (Serbia) Partizan)
—	MF	ISR	Sintayehu Sallalich (loan return to (Israel) Maccabi Haifa)
—	FW	ARG	Nicolás Falczuk (to (Israel) Hapoel Be'er Sheva)
—	DF	ISR	Nisso Kapiloto (To (Cyprus) Alki Larnaca)

=== Ironi Kiryat Shmona ===
In: Note: Flags indicate national team as defined under FIFA eligibility rules; some limited exceptions apply. Players may hold more than one non-FIFA nationality.

No.	Pos.	Nation	Player
—	MF	MKD	Darko Tasevski (from (Bulgaria) Levski Sofia)
—	MF	ISR	Maor Elimelech (loan return from (Israel) Hapoel Herzliya)
—	MF	FIN	Roni Porokara (from (Belgium) Beerschot)
—	MF	ISR	Dan Einbinder (from (Israel) Beitar Jerusalem)
—	FW	ISR	Yuval Avidor (loan return from (Israel) Hapoel Haifa)
—	FW	HUN	László Lencse (on loan from (Hungary) Videoton)
—	MF	ISR	Sintayehu Sallalich (on loan from (Israel) Maccabi Haifa)

Out: Note: Flags indicate national team as defined under FIFA eligibility rules; some limited exceptions apply. Players may hold more than one non-FIFA nationality.

No.	Pos.	Nation	Player
—	FW	ISR	Shlomi Azulay (loan return to (Israel) Maccabi Haifa)
—	FW	ISR	Yuval Avidor (to (Israel) Hapoel Haifa)
—	MF	ZAM	William Njovu (to (Israel) Hapoel Be'er Sheva)
—	DF	ISR	Eitan Tibi (to (Israel) Maccabi Tel Aviv)
—	FW	ISR	Barak Badash (on loan to (Belgium) Waasland-Beveren)

=== Ironi Nir Ramat HaSharon ===
In: Note: Flags indicate national team as defined under FIFA eligibility rules; some limited exceptions apply. Players may hold more than one non-FIFA nationality.

No.	Pos.	Nation	Player
—	FW	MKD	Hristijan Kirovski (from (Cyprus) Apollon Limassol)
—	MF	ISR	Tom Mansharov (from (Israel) Maccabi Tel Aviv)
—	MF	ISR	Assi Baldout (from (Israel) Hapoel Rishon LeZion)
—	FW	ARG	Adrián Fernández (from (Israel) Hapoel Ramat Gan)
—	DF	ISR	Kobi Musa (from (Israel) Hapoel Rishon LeZion)
—	DF	BUL	Yordan Miliev (from (Bulgaria) Levski Sofia)

Out: Note: Flags indicate national team as defined under FIFA eligibility rules; some limited exceptions apply. Players may hold more than one non-FIFA nationality.

No.	Pos.	Nation	Player
—	FW	ISR	Tomer Swisa (To (Israel) Hapoel Be'er Sheva)
—	DF	SRB	Darko Lovric (To (Serbia) Sloboda Užice)
—	FW	SRB	Ognjen Damjanovic (To (Serbia) Donji Srem)

=== Hapoel Be'er Sheva ===
In: Note: Flags indicate national team as defined under FIFA eligibility rules; some limited exceptions apply. Players may hold more than one non-FIFA nationality.

No.	Pos.	Nation	Player
—	FW	ISR	Tomer Swisa (from (Israel) Ramat HaSharon)
—	FW	ARG	Nicolás Falczuk (from (Israel) Hapoel Acco)
—	GK	NGA	Austin Ejide (from (Israel) Hapoel Petah Tikva)
—	MF	ZAM	William Njovu (from (Israel) Ironi Kiryat Shmona)
—	DF	ISR	Klemi Saban (from (Israel) Maccabi Tel Aviv)
—	DF	BIH	Bojan Marković (from (Bosnia and Herzegovina) Borac Banja Luka)
—	MF	KEN	Patrick Osiako (from (Romania) FC Petrolul Ploiești)
—	FW	ISR	Roi Kahat (on loan from (Israel) Maccabi Tel Aviv)
—	FW	ISR	Dia Saba (on loan from (Israel) Maccabi Tel Aviv)

Out: Note: Flags indicate national team as defined under FIFA eligibility rules; some limited exceptions apply. Players may hold more than one non-FIFA nationality.

No.	Pos.	Nation	Player
—	MF	ISR	Yossi Shivhon (To (Israel) Maccabi Netanya)
—	DF	ISR	Shimon Harush (To (Israel) Bnei Sakhnin)
—	GK	ISR	Ohad Levita (to (Cyprus) Omonia)
—	FW	MNE	Petar Grbić (loan return to (Greece) Olympiacos)
—	DF	COL	Iván Garrido (to Free agent)
—	MF	BIH	Nenad Kiso (to Free agent)
—	DF	MNE	Draško Božović (to Free agent)

=== Hapoel Haifa ===
In: Note: Flags indicate national team as defined under FIFA eligibility rules; some limited exceptions apply. Players may hold more than one non-FIFA nationality.

No.	Pos.	Nation	Player
—	DF	ISR	Oded Elkayam (loan return from (Israel) Bnei Sakhnin)
—	DF	SRB	Dušan Brković (from (Serbia) Smederevo)
—	DF	SRB	Danilo Nikolić (from (Turkey) Elazığspor)
—	MF	ISR	Guy Tzarfati (from (Israel) Hapoel Petah Tikva)
—	MF	SUI	Fabian Stoller (from (Israel) Hapoel Petah Tikva)
—	FW	ISR	Mahran Lala (from (Israel) Hapoel Tel Aviv)
—	FW	ISR	Yuval Avidor (from (Israel) Kiryat Shmona)

Out: Note: Flags indicate national team as defined under FIFA eligibility rules; some limited exceptions apply. Players may hold more than one non-FIFA nationality.

No.	Pos.	Nation	Player
—	DF	ISR	Oded Elkayam (To (Israel) Maccabi Haifa)
—	MF	PLE	Ali El-Khatib (To (Israel) Maccabi Netanya)
—	FW	SRB	Dragan Ćeran (To (Israel) Maccabi Netanya)
—	FW	ISR	Yuval Avidor (loan return to (Israel) Kiryat Shmona)
—	FW	ISR	Alon Buzorgi (To (Israel) Beitar Tel Aviv)
—	MF	ISR	Michael Zandberg (To (Israel) Hapoel Ramat Gan)
—	MF	ISR	Hanan Maman (on loan to (Israel) Hapoel Tel Aviv)

=== Hapoel Ramat Gan ===
In: Note: Flags indicate national team as defined under FIFA eligibility rules; some limited exceptions apply. Players may hold more than one non-FIFA nationality.

No.	Pos.	Nation	Player
—	MF	ISR	Yisrael Zaguri (from (Israel) Maccabi Haifa)
—	MF	ISR	Michael Zandberg (from (Israel) Hapoel Haifa)
—	DF	ISR	Tal Ma'abi (from (Israel) Maccabi Petah Tikva)
—	MF	CTA	David Manga (on loan from (Serbia) FK Partizan)
—	DF	ISR	Lior Reuven (from (Israel) Maccabi Netanya)
—	GK	ISR	Guy Solomon (Free agent)

Out: Note: Flags indicate national team as defined under FIFA eligibility rules; some limited exceptions apply. Players may hold more than one non-FIFA nationality.

No.	Pos.	Nation	Player
—	FW	ARG	Adrián Fernández (to (Israel) Ramat HaSharon)

=== Hapoel Tel Aviv ===
In: Note: Flags indicate national team as defined under FIFA eligibility rules; some limited exceptions apply. Players may hold more than one non-FIFA nationality.

No.	Pos.	Nation	Player
—	FW	ISR	Tal Ben Haim (from (Israel) Maccabi Petah Tikva)
—	DF	ISR	Ze'ev Haimovich (from (Russia) Terek Grozny)
—	DF	ISR	Eliran Danin (from (Israel) Hapoel Acre)
—	MF	BRA	Bruno (from (Poland) Polonia Warsaw)
—	MF	ISR	Hanan Maman (on loan from (Israel) Hapoel Haifa)
—	FW	ISR	Victor Merey (loan return from (Israel) Maccabi Petah Tikva)
—	MF	GHA	William Owusu (loan return from (Israel) Hapoel Kfar Saba)
—	DF	GHA	John Paintsil (from (England) Leicester City)
—	MF	CMR	Eric Djemba-Djemba (from (Denmark) OB Odense)
—	DF	SRB	Nikola Petković (from (Serbia) Red Star Belgrade)
—	MF	ISR	Gil Vermouth (from (Germany) 1. FC Kaiserslautern)

Out: Note: Flags indicate national team as defined under FIFA eligibility rules; some limited exceptions apply. Players may hold more than one non-FIFA nationality.

No.	Pos.	Nation	Player
—	FW	ISR	Mahran Lala (to (Israel) Hapoel Haifa)
—	DF	RSA	Bevan Fransman (to (South Africa) Supersport)
—	MF	GHA	William Owusu (to (Israel) Ashdod)
—	MF	CRO	Mirko Oremus (loan return to (Croatia) Hajduk Split)
—	DF	SVN	Marko Šuler (loan return to (Belgium) Gent)
—	MF	NGA	Nosa Igiebor (to (Spain) Real Betis)
—	DF	ISR	Gal Shish (to (Belgium) Waasland-Beveren)
—	MF	ISR	Mahmoud Abbas (on loan to (Israel) Bnei Sakhnin)

=== Maccabi Haifa ===
In: Note: Flags indicate national team as defined under FIFA eligibility rules; some limited exceptions apply. Players may hold more than one non-FIFA nationality.

No.	Pos.	Nation	Player
—	DF	ISR	Oded Elkayam (From (Israel) Hapoel Haifa)
—	DF	ISR	Shmuel Scheimann (From (Netherlands) Excelsior)
—	MF	ISR	Chen Ezra (From (Israel) Maccabi Netanya)
—	FW	RSA	Dino Ndlovu (from (Israel) Bnei Yehuda)
—	DF	RSA	Tsepo Masilela (loan return from (Spain) Getafe)
—	DF	UKR	Andriy Pylyavskyi (loan return from (Israel) Beitar Jerusalem)
—	MF	ISR	Sintayehu Sallalich (loan return from (Israel) Hapoel Acco)
—	GK	ISR	Amir Edri (loan return from (Israel) Maccabi Netanya)
—	MF	ISR	Alex Zahavi (loan return from (Portugal) Vitória Setubal)
—	FW	ISR	Shlomi Azulay (loan return from (Israel) Ironi Kiryat Shmona)
—	FW	ISR	Mohammed Kalibat (loan return from (Israel) Maccabi Netanya)
—	MF	ISR	Yisrael Zaguri (loan return from (Israel) Bnei Yehuda)
—	DF	ISR	Dekel Keinan (on loan from (Wales) Cardiff City)

Out: Note: Flags indicate national team as defined under FIFA eligibility rules; some limited exceptions apply. Players may hold more than one non-FIFA nationality.

No.	Pos.	Nation	Player
—	MF	GHA	Seidu Yahaya (to (Romania) Astra Ploiești)
—	MF	ISR	Yisrael Zaguri (to (Israel) Hapoel Ramat Gan)
—	MF	ISR	Bar Avitan (to (Israel) Maccabi Ahi Nazareth)
—	MF	ISR	Alex Zahavi (to (Portugal) Olhanense)
—	FW	CRO	Danijel Cesarec (to (Croatia) Rijeka)
—	DF	RSA	Tsepo Masilela (to (South Africa) Kaizer Chiefs)
—	DF	ISR	Ali Ottman (on loan to (Israel) Bnei Sakhnin)
—	FW	ISR	Mohammed Kalibat (on loan to (Israel) Bnei Sakhnin)
—	FW	ISR	Hen Azriel (on loan to (Israel) Beitar Jerusalem)
—	DF	ISR	Haim Megrelashvili (on loan to (Israel) Beitar Jerusalem)
—	FW	ISR	Mohammad Ghadir (on loan to (Belgium) Waasland-Beveren)
—	FW	ISR	Sintayehu Sallalich (on loan to (Israel) Ironi Kiryat Shmona)
—	DF	ISR	Sari Falah (on loan to (Israel) Bnei Yehuda Tel Aviv F.C.)

=== Maccabi Netanya ===
In: Note: Flags indicate national team as defined under FIFA eligibility rules; some limited exceptions apply. Players may hold more than one non-FIFA nationality.

No.	Pos.	Nation	Player
—	FW	SRB	Dragan Ćeran (from (Israel) Hapoel Haifa)
—	FW	ISR	Idan Shriki (from (Israel) F.C. Ashdod)
—	MF	ISR	Ali El-Khatib (from (Israel) Hapoel Haifa)
—	DF	ISR	Ori Shitrit (on loan from (Israel) Bnei Sakhnin)
—	FW	ISR	Omer Peretz (from (Israel) Sektzia Nes Tziona)
—	GK	ITA	Luigi Cennamo (from (Greece) Panetolikos)
—	MF	ISR	Yossi Shivhon (from (Israel) Hapoel Be'er Sheva)
—	FW	ISR	Yarden Cohen (loan return from (Israel) Nazareth Illit)
—	DF	ISR	Gal Genish (loan return from (Israel) Ironi Bat Yam)
—	FW	ISR	Aviv Azaria (loan return from (Israel) Hapoel Ramat Gan)

Out: Note: Flags indicate national team as defined under FIFA eligibility rules; some limited exceptions apply. Players may hold more than one non-FIFA nationality.

No.	Pos.	Nation	Player
—	MF	ISR	Hen Ezra (To (Israel) Maccabi Haifa)
—	DF	ISR	Lior Reuven (To (Israel) Hapoel Ramat Gan)
—	FW	MDA	Serghei Alexeev (To (Hungary) Kaposvári)
—	FW	ISR	Nir Nachum (To (Israel) Bnei Yehuda)
—	DF	GER	Ivan Ćosić (Free agent)
—	GK	ISR	Amir Edri (loan return to (Israel) Maccabi Haifa)
—	FW	ISR	Mohammed Kalibat (loan return to (Israel) Maccabi Haifa)
—	DF	ISR	Gal Genish (on loan to (Israel) Maccabi Ironi Kfar Yona)
—	FW	ISR	Aviv Azaria (om loan return (Israel) Maccabi Herzliya)

=== Maccabi Tel Aviv ===
In: Note: Flags indicate national team as defined under FIFA eligibility rules; some limited exceptions apply. Players may hold more than one non-FIFA nationality.

No.	Pos.	Nation	Player
—	MF	ESP	Gonzalo García (from (Cyprus) AEK Larnaca)
—	DF	ESP	Carlos García (from (Spain) Almería)
—	DF	ISR	Dor Malul (loan return from (Belgium) Beerschot)
—	MF	ISR	Maharan Radi (from (Israel) Bnei Sakhnin)
—	DF	ISR	Eitan Tibi (from (Israel) Hapoel Ironi Kiryat Shmona)
—	DF	CIV	Steve Gohouri (from (England) Wigan Athletic)
—	GK	NGA	Vincent Enyeama (on loan from (France) Lille)
—	FW	WAL	Robert Earnshaw (on loan from (Wales) Cardiff City)
—	MF	ISR	Hasan Abu Zaid (from (Israel) Bnei Yehuda)

Out: Note: Flags indicate national team as defined under FIFA eligibility rules; some limited exceptions apply. Players may hold more than one non-FIFA nationality.

No.	Pos.	Nation	Player
—	DF	MNE	Savo Pavićević (To (Cyprus) Omonia)
—	DF	ISR	Dor Malul (to (Belgium) Beerschot)
—	MF	ISR	Tom Mansharov (to (Israel) Ramat HaSharon)
—	DF	ISR	Klemi Saban (to (Israel) Hapoel Be'er Sheva)
—	DF	BRA	Nivaldo (To (Portugal) Rio Ave)
—	FW	SEN	Moussa Konaté (to (Russia) FC Krasnodar)
—	MF	BIH	Haris Medunjanin (on loan to (Turkey) Gaziantepspor)
—	FW	ISR	Roi Kahat (on loan to (Israel) Hapoel Be'er Sheva)
—	DF	CRO	Roberto Punčec (on loan to (Germany) Union Berlin)
—	FW	ISR	Dia Saba (on loan to (Israel) Hapoel Be'er Sheva)
—	GK	ISR	Guy Haimov (on loan to (Cyprus) AEK Larnaca)
—	FW	ISR	Barak Yitzhaki (on loan to (Cyprus) Anorthosis Famagusta)
—	MF	ISR	Ruslan Breski (on loan to (Israel) Bnei Yehuda)
