= Assimi =

Assimi can be both a masculine given name and a surname. Notable people with the name include:

- Assimi Goita, Malian military officer
- Adam Assimi, Beninese athlete
- Wissam Assimi (born 1976), Israeli football manager and former footballer

== See also ==
- Malika El Assimi, Moroccan poet, author, and academic
