= Alain Masudi =

Congolese footballer (born 1978)

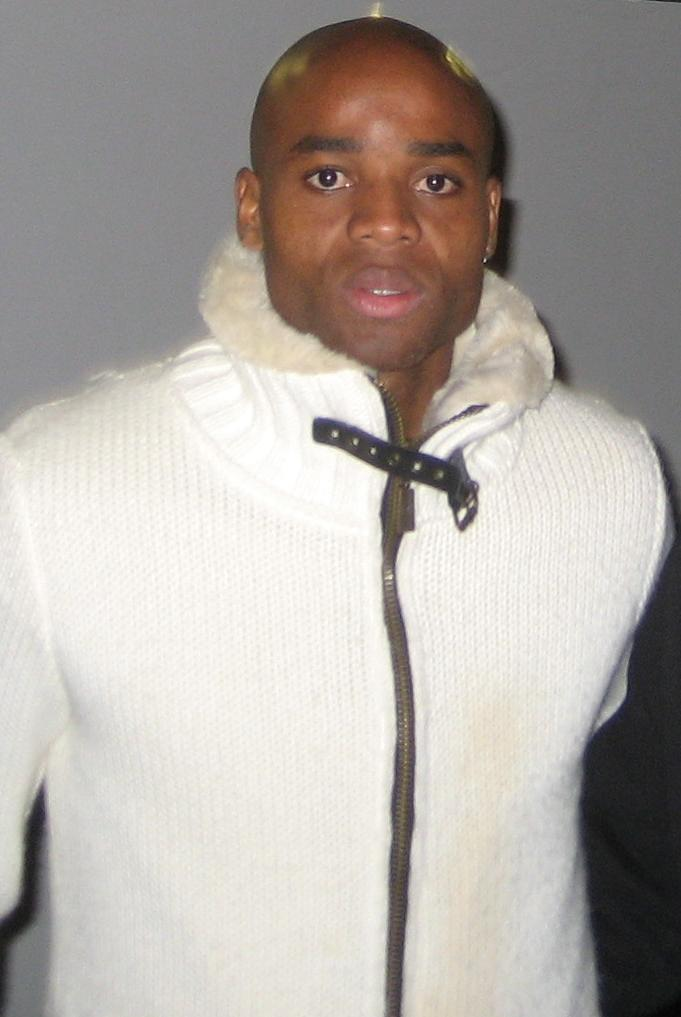
- Masudi in 2006

Personal information
- Full name: Alain Masudi Ekakanga
- Date of birth: 12 February 1978 (age 48)
- Place of birth: Kinshasa, Zaire
- Positions: Striker; midfielder

Senior career*
Years	Team	Apps	(Gls)
1997	Bastia	1	(0)
1997–1999	Nîmes	39	(3)
1999–2000	Saint-Étienne	8	(1)
2000–2001	Lausanne-Sport	14	(1)
2001–2003	Sturm Graz	48	(10)
2003–2004	Al-Ittihad	24	(8)
2004–2005	Bnei Sakhnin	26	(5)
2005–2006	Maccabi Netanya	30	(9)
2006–2007	Maccabi Haifa	24	(5)
2007	F.C. Ashdod	14	(1)
2008	Maccabi Tel Aviv	14	(6)
2008–2009	Maccabi Herzliya	30	(8)
2009	Dalian Shide	11	(1)
2010–2011	Maccabi Herzliya	31	(13)
2011–2012	Ironi Ramat HaSharon	32	(4)
2012–2015	Maccabi Ahi Nazareth	103	(28)
Total		449	(103)

International career
1998–2006	Congo DR	12	(2)

Managerial career
- 2020–: Sporting Tel Aviv
- * Club domestic league appearances and goals

Alain Masudi Ekakanga (born 12 February 1978) is a Congolese former professional footballer who played as a striker or midfielder.

== Career ==
Masudi was part of the Congolese 2004 African Nations Cup team, who finished bottom of their group in the first round of competition, thus failing to secure qualification for the quarter-finals. Masudi managed to score the only goal for Congo in the competition.

In 2004 Masudi first ventured into Israeli football playing for Bnei Sakhnin. For the 2005–06 season, Masudi moved on to play for the newly promoted Maccabi Netanya in the Israeli Premier League.

During the close season of 2006, Masudi moved to his third Israeli club, Maccabi Haifa and in the 2007–08 season he played in F.C. Ashdod and Maccabi Tel Aviv.

On 26 June 2008, he decided to join Daniel Jammer's Maccabi Netanya after having troubles with officials from Maccabi Tel Aviv. On 29 July 2008, he was released from the team after he requested to extend the contract.

On 12 September 2008, Masudi agreed on a one-year-contract with Maccabi Herzliya from the second league. Masudi will reunite with Eyal Lahman, the man who brought him to Israel four years ago to Bnei Sakhnin.

On 30 July 2009, Dalian Shide signed Masudi with a contract worth $330,000 for a season and a half.

In July 2010 he returned to Israel and agreed again on a one-year deal with Herzlyia in the second league.

In June 2011 he made his return to the Israeli Premier League as he was to be a part of the newly promoted Ironi Nir Ramat HaSharon in their debut season in the top flight.

== Personal life ==
He holds both DR Congo and French nationalities.

== Honours ==
- Austrian Bundesliga: Runner-up: 2001–02
- ÖFB-Cup: Runner-up: 2002
- Libyan Premier League: Runner-up: 2003–04
