= Kollie =

Kollie is a Liberian surname. Notable people with the name include:

- Amos Kollie (born 1990), Liberian footballer
- Perry Kollie (born 1982), Liberian footballer
- Prince Kollie (born 2003), American football linebacker
