= Ryan Adeleye =

American-Israeli football player

Ryan Adeleye ריאן אדלי
Personal information
- Full name: Ryan Alexander Hezekiah Adeleye ריאן אלכסנדר חזקיה אדלי
- Date of birth: April 28, 1987 (age 39)
- Place of birth: Elizabeth, New Jersey, United States
- Position: Defender

Youth career
- 2005–2006: Davidson Wildcats
- 2007–2008: North Carolina Tar Heels

Senior career*
Years	Team	Apps	(Gls)
2008	Carolina Dynamo	5	(0)
2009	Newark Ironbound Express	5	(0)
2009–2013	Hapoel Be'er Sheva	43	(2)
2013–2014	Hapoel Ashkelon	41	(4)
2015	Fort Lauderdale Strikers	2	(0)
2015–2016	Hapoel Jerusalem	24	(1)
2016–2017	Pittsburgh Riverhounds	12	(0)
2018	Atlantic City FC	0	(0)
- * Club domestic league appearances and goals

Ryan Alexander Hezekiah Adeleye (Hebrew: ריאן אלכסנדר חזקיה אדלי; born April 28, 1987) is an American-Israeli former professional soccer player who last played for Atlantic City FC in the National Premier Soccer League.

== Biography ==
=== Early life ===
Adeleye was born to Manny Adeleye and Lori Herzig, and is Jewish. His father is a Nigerian who converted to Judaism, while his mother is a Jew from Connecticut. Adeleye attended high school at Newark Academy, where he received all-state, all-conference, all-prep and all-county honors in soccer.

=== College ===
Adeleye attended Davidson College from 2005 to 2006. Afterwards, he transferred to the University of North Carolina where he was a member of the North Carolina Tar Heels men's soccer team. Adeleye's goal for the Tar Heels in a 2007 match against Duke earned him ACC player of the week. After college, Adeleye entered the 2009 MLS SuperDraft where he went undrafted. That same summer, Adeleye was named to the US men's squad for the 2009 Maccabiah Games in Israel.

=== Israel ===
As part of the US Maccabiah team, Adeleye featured in a friendly match against Israeli Premier League side Hapoel Be'er Sheva. Adeleye managed to impress manager Guy Azouri and joined Be'er Sheva on trial at the conclusion of the men's tournament along with teammate Daniel Schultz.

After being signed, Adeleye counted as a foreigner for the club as they awaited his naturalization via the Law of Return. Adeleye made his professional debut for Be'er Sheva in a Toto Cup match against Hapoel Petah Tikva on August 18, 2009. The result was a 1–0 loss.

During a training session in October 2009, Adeleye collapsed, causing panic within the club. He returned to regular training a week later with the permission of the medical staff. The event was scary for Be'er Sheva as it was a tough reminder of former player Chaswe Nsofwa, who died during a training match. About a month later, on December 5, 2009, Adeleye made his league debut, coming on for Shimon Harush in the 86th minute in a 2–0 victory over Hapoel Petah Tikva.

== Career statistics ==
Club performance			League		Cup		League Cup		Continental		Total	
Season	Club	League	Apps	Goals	Apps	Goals	Apps	Goals	Apps	Goals	Apps	Goals
USA			League		Open Cup		League Cup		North America		Total	
2008	Carolina Dynamo	PDL	5	0	-	-	-	-	-	-	5	0
2009	Newark Ironbound Express	PDL	5	0	-	-	-	-	-	-	5	0
Total	USA		10	0	-	-	-	-	-	-	10	0
Total	Israel			League		Israel State Cup		Toto Cup		Europe		Total
2009–10	Hapoel Be'er Sheva	Ligat ha'Al	8	1	0	0	2	0	0	0	10	1
2010–11	Hapoel Be'er Sheva	Ligat ha'Al	17	0	0	0	0	0	0	0	17	0
2011–12	Hapoel Be'er Sheva	Ligat ha'Al	17	1	0	0	0	0	0	0	17	1
Israel		Ligat ha'Al	44	2	0	2	0	0	0	0	44	2
Career total			54	2	0	0	2	0	0	0	54	2

== See also ==
- List of select Jewish football (association; soccer) players
