= Jairo Swirsky =

Brazilian football manager (born 1968)

Personal information
- Date of birth: 15 May 1968 (age 58)
- Place of birth: Brazil

Managerial career
- Years: Team
- 2011/2012: Naxxar Lions F.C.
- 2016: Yangon United FC
- 2017: Bnei Sakhnin F.C.

Jairo Swirsky (born 15 May 1968 in Brazil) is a Brazilian football manager.
