= Gavri Levy =

Israeli choreographer and sports manager

- גברי לוי
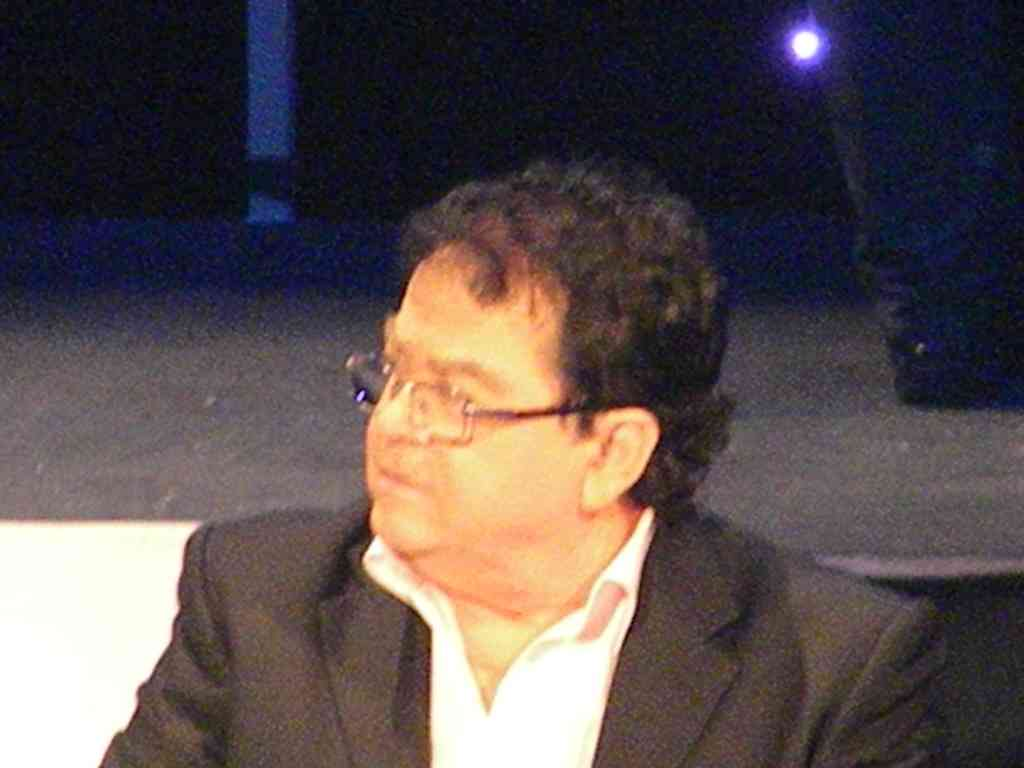
- Born: 24 December 1937; Petah Tikva, Mandatory Palestine
- Died: 16 August 2018 (aged 80)
- Burial place: Segula Cemetery
- Other name: Gavri Levi
- Occupations: dancer, actor, choreographer
- Children: 3
- Family: Guy Levy (son), Keren Levy, Oren Levy

Gavri Levy (Hebrew: גברי לוי; 24 December 1937 – 16 August 2018), also known as Gavri Levi, was an Israeli dancer, choreographer who also served as a chairman of the Israel Football Association from 1996 to 2003. His son Guy Levy is a former professional footballer.

== Career ==
He emerged as a renowned choreographer in Israel and had worked as a choreographer on several Israeli television shows. He also served as a judge on the Israeli TV programme Rokdim Im Kokhavim ("Dancing with the Stars").

== Death ==
He died on the morning of 16 August 2018, aged 80, after being hospitalized for a serious illness in the previous few weeks.
