= Eden Shrem =

Israeli footballer

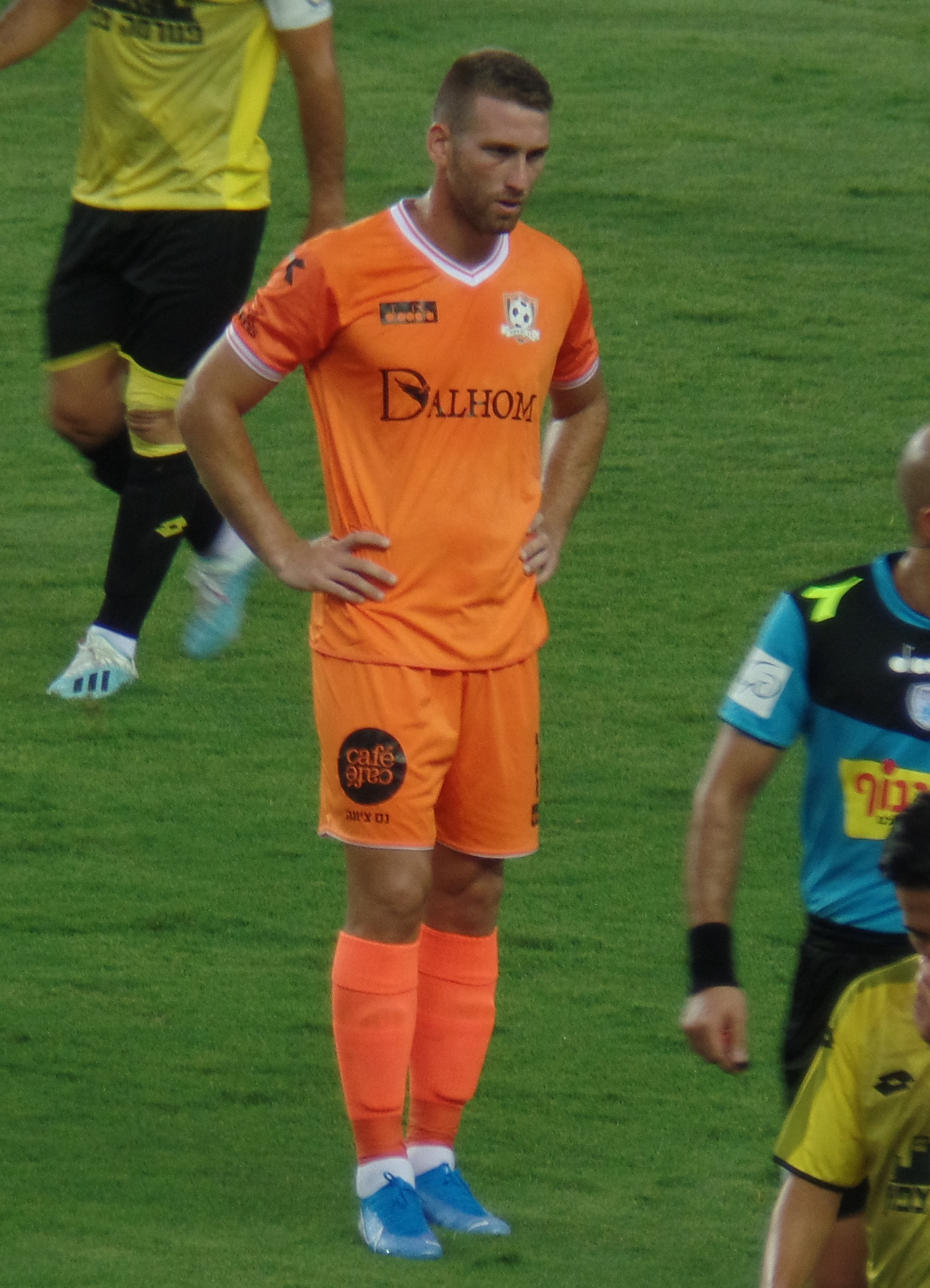
- Shrem in 2019

Personal information
- Full name: Eden Shrem
- Date of birth: March 9, 1993 (age 33)
- Place of birth: Rishon LeZion, Israel
- Position: Forward

Youth career
- 2002–2012: Hapoel Tel Aviv

Senior career*
Years	Team	Apps	(Gls)
2012–2015	Hapoel Tel Aviv	17	(2)
2013–2014	→ Hapoel Rishon LeZion (loan)	22	(4)
2015	→ Beitar Tel Aviv Ramla (loan)	13	(4)
2015–2016	Hapoel Rishon LeZion	36	(11)
2016–2017	Beitar Tel Aviv Ramla	34	(14)
2017–2018	Maccabi Netanya	16	(1)
2018	Maccabi Petah Tikva	7	(1)
2018–2019	Hapoel Katamon	19	(2)
2019–2020	Sektzia Ness Ziona	7	(0)
2020	F.C. Kafr Qasim	14	(4)
2020–2021	Hapoel Rishon LeZion	8	(2)
2021	Maccabi Ironi Ashdod	6	(1)
2021–2022	Hapoel Marmorek	16	(2)
2022–2023	Ironi Beit Dagan	28	(1)

International career
2009	Israel U17	12	(3)
2010–2011	Israel U18	5	(0)
- * Club domestic league appearances and goals as of 1 January 2024

Eden Shrem (Hebrew: עדן שרם; born March 9, 1993) is an Israeli footballer who currently plays at Hapoel Marmorek.

== Early life ==
Shrem was born in Rishon LeZion, Israel, to a Jewish family.

== Career ==
Shrem grew up in the youth department of Hapoel Tel Aviv and in season 2011/2012 scored 16 in 33 games in the youth team. At the end of that season he was playing first team uniforms.

== Clubs career statistics ==
As to 17 July 2014

Season	Club	League		Cup		Toto Cup		Europe		Total	
Season	Club	Apps	Goals	Apps	Goals	Apps	Goals	Apps	Goals	Apps	Goals
2011–12	Hapoel Tel Aviv	1	0	1	0	1	0	0	0	3	0
2012–13	Hapoel Tel Aviv	0	0	0	0	3	1	0	0	3	1
2013–14	Hapoel Rishon LeZion	22	4	0	0	0	0	0	0	22	4
2014–15	Hapoel Tel Aviv	6	0	0	0	3	0	1	0	10	0
Total		23	4	1	0	4	1	1	0	29	5
