= Wissam Assimi =

Israeli footballer

Wissam Assimi ويسام عيسمي
Personal information
- Full name: Wissam Assimi
- Date of birth: July 12, 1976 (age 50)
- Place of birth: Daliyat al-Karmel, Israel
- Height: 5 ft 10 in (1.78 m)
- Position: Striker

Youth career
- Hapoel Daliyat al-Karmel

Senior career*
Years	Team	Apps	(Gls)
- Hapoel Daliyat al-Karmel
- Maccabi Yeruham
- Hapoel Dimona
1998–1999	Bnei Yehuda		(15)
1999–2000	Maccabi Netanya		(1)
2000	Bnei Sakhnin		(1)
2001	Hapoel Beit She'an		(3)
2001–2002	Bnei Sakhnin		(3)
2002–2003	Hapoel Daliyat al-Karmel		
2003–2004	Hapoel Reineh		
2004–2008	Hapoel Kafr Kanna		
2008–2011	Hapoel Daliyat al-Karmel	71	(45)
2011	Hapoel Isfiya	15	(8)
2011	Hapoel Kafr Kanna	4	(0)
2011–2012	F.C. Bu'eine	20	(9)

Managerial career
- 2012–2013: Maccabi Daliyat al-Karmel
- 2015: Maccabi Isfiya
- * Club domestic league appearances and goals

Wissam Assimi (Arabic: ويسام عيسمي, Hebrew: ויסאם עיסמי; born 12 July 1976) is a retired Israeli footballer who now works as a manager.
