= Momi Zafran =

Israeli football coach (born 1956)

Momi Zafran מומי זפרן
Personal information
- Date of birth: 13 July 1956 (age 70)
- Place of birth: Israel

Managerial career
- Years: Team
- 1999–2000: Maccabi Ahi Nazareth
- 2000–2001: Maccabi Ironi Kiryat Ata
- 2002–2003: Bnei Sakhnin
- 2004–2005: Maccabi Ahi Nazareth
- 2005: Bnei Sakhnin
- 2006: Hapoel Acre
- 2009–2010: Ahva Arraba
- 2010–2011: Ironi Nir Ramat HaSharon
- 2016: Hapoel Acre

Momi Zafran (Hebrew: מומי זפרן; born 13 July 1956) is an Israeli football coach.
