= Eyad Hutba =

Israeli footballer

I'yad Hutba
Personal information
- Full name: I'yad Hutba
- Date of birth: 20 November 1987 (age 38)
- Place of birth: Reineh, Israel
- Height: 1.77 m (5 ft 9 1/2 in)
- Positions: Right back; right midfielder

Team information
- Current team: Maccabi Bnei Reineh
- Number: 29

Youth career
- Hapoel Reineh

Senior career*
| Years | Team | Apps | (Gls) |
| 2006–2007 | Hapoel Reineh | 25 | (6) |
| 2007–2009 | Maccabi Kafr Kanna | 54 | (6) |
| 2009–2011 | Hapoel Petah Tikva | 49 | (0) |
| 2011–2014 | Hapoel Tel Aviv | 42 | (0) |
| 2014–2021 | Maccabi Ahi Nazareth | 209 | (7) |
| 2021– | Maccabi Bnei Reineh | 102 | (2) |

International career
| 2011 | Israel | 1 | (0) |
- * Club domestic league appearances and goals as of 24 June 2026

I'yad Hutba (Arabic: اياد خطبا, Hebrew: איאד ח'וטבא; born November 20, 1987) is an Israeli footballer who plays for Maccabi Bnei Reineh and the Israel national football team.
