= Nitzan Shirazi =

Israeli footballer and manager

Nitzan Shirazi ניצן שירזי
Personal information
- Full name: Nitzan Shirazi
- Date of birth: 21 July 1971
- Place of birth: Tel Aviv, Israel
- Date of death: 22 July 2014 (aged 43)
- Place of death: Tel Aviv, Israel
- Position: Midfielder

Youth career
- Bnei Yehuda
- Maccabi Tel Aviv

Senior career*
| Years | Team | Apps | (Gls) |
- Bnei Yehuda
- Hapoel Kfar Shalem
- Hapoel Kiryat Malakhi
- Hapoel Kfar Saba

International career
- Israel U19

Managerial career
- Maccabi Tel Aviv Youth
- 2005–2008: Bnei Yehuda
- 2008–2009: Maccabi Petah Tikva
- 2010–2011: Hapoel Haifa
- 2012: Hapoel Tel Aviv
- * Club domestic league appearances and goals

Nitzan Shirazi (Hebrew: ניצן שירזי; 21 July 1971 – 22 July 2014) was an Israeli association football player and manager.

== Playing career ==
Born in Tel Aviv in 1971, at the age of eight he played in the Bnei Yehuda kids team, then moved to the youth team and led the team to win the championship.

Shirazi moved to the Bnei Yehuda senior team at age of 17 and was immediately summoned to the youth national team but did not receive a summons to the adult team. Later in his career he left the Bnei Yehuda and went to play in lower divisions and finally retired from playing due to injury.

== Manager career ==
After retiring from the game, Shirazi began coaching Bnei Yehuda youth team. before the beginning of the 2004 season he was appointed assistant manager of Bnei Yehuda senior team, Guy Levy. After Levy's resignation, he was appointed as the team manager. During the 2005–06 season he extended his contract.

In the 2006–07, Shirazi led Bnei Yehuda to the Israeli State Cup final against Hapoel Tel Aviv but Yeghia Yavruyan goal prevent Shirazi winning the cup after 19 years.

In the 2007–08 was Shirazi's final season in Bnei Yehuda. After persuasion agreed Nitzan Shirazi to continue in his position as the manager of Bnei Yehuda fifth year, but after a six consecutive losses Shirazi resigned after the 11th round ended four and a half seasons as the manager of Bnei Yehuda.

On 21 August 2008, he was appointed the manager of Maccabi Petah Tikva but did not continue coaching the team next season.

On 9 February 2010, Shirazi was appointed director of Hapoel Haifa. On 5 June 2010, he was appointed the manager of Hapoel Haifa. On 26 November 2011, he resigned from Hapoel Haifa.

On 11 January 2012, he was appointed the manager of Hapoel Tel Aviv. On 27 September 2012, Shirazi stepped down as manager for health reasons.

== Personal life ==
Son of the Meir Shirazi, Bnei Yehuda team manager in the past, and the brother of Hezi Shirazi, a former player.

He was married to Shusha Shirazi until his death from brain cancer in 2014.

== Honours ==
- Toto Cup:
  - Runner-up (1): 2011-12
- Israeli Premier League:
  - Runner-up (1): 2011-12
- Israel State Cup:
  - Winner (1): 2012
