= Asael Ben Shabat =

Israeli footballer

Asael Ben Shabat עשהאל בן שבת
Personal information
- Full name: Asael Ben Shabat
- Date of birth: May 9, 1988 (age 38)
- Place of birth: Emunim, Israel
- Height: 5 ft 9 in (1.75 m)
- Position: Center-back

Youth career
- Maccabi Netanya

Senior career*
| Years | Team | Apps | (Gls) |
| 2006–2008 | Maccabi Netanya | 1 | (0) |
| 2008–2009 | Hapoel Kfar Saba | 27 | (2) |
| 2009–2014 | Hapoel Ramat HaSharon | 81 | (5) |
| 2014 | Panthrakikos | 11 | (1) |
| 2014–2015 | Kerkyra | 4 | (0) |
| 2015–2016 | Hapoel Petah Tikva | 17 | (3) |
| 2016 | Hapoel Bnei Ashdod | 5 | (0) |
| 2016–2017 | Hapoel Baqa al-Gharbiyye | 15 | (3) |
| 2017–2018 | F.C. Dimona | 15 | (1) |
| 2018 | Hapoel Baqa al-Gharbiyye | 8 | (1) |
| 2024– | Hapoel Bnei Ashdod | 12 | (0) |
- * Club domestic league appearances and goals

Asael Ben Shabat (Hebrew: עשהאל בן שבת) is a former Israeli footballer.

== Honours ==
- Toto Cup (Leumit):
  - 2010
- Liga Leumit:
  - 2010-11
