= Malika El Assimi =

Moroccan poet

Malika El Assemi
- مليكة العاصمي
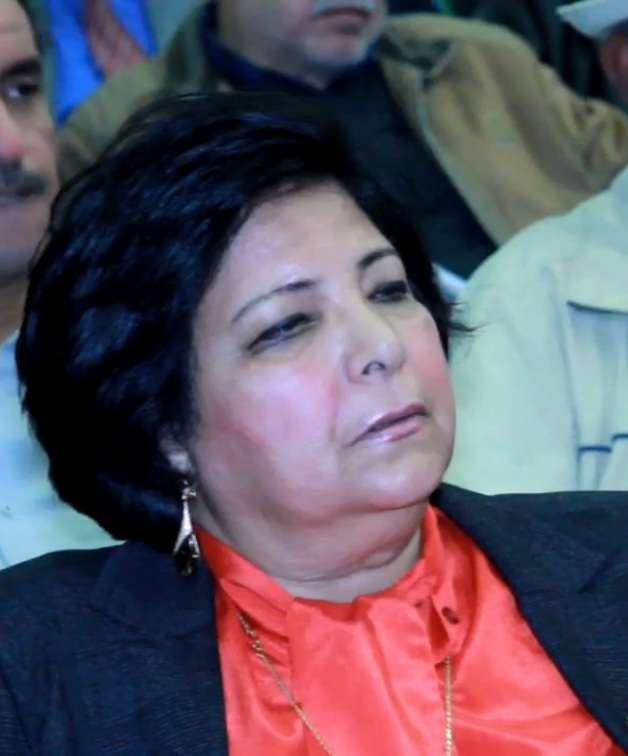
- Malika el Assimi being honored in a televised event in 2017.
- Born: 1946 (age 79–80); Marrakesh, Morocco
- Writing career
- Notable work: Al-Hikayat al-Shabiya: Hikayat al-Nisa

Malika El Assimi (Arabic: مليكة العاصمي; born in 1946) is a Moroccan poet, author, and academic. She is a faculty member of the Muhammad V University. She is also an activist and most of her literary works promote women's rights. El Assimi is also a politician.

== Biography ==
El Assimi was born in 1946 in Marrakesh. She was the daughter Abdelkader Hassan el Assimi, a prominent figure of Moroccan independence movement and also a poet. She completed a degree in Arabic literature and a certificate in comparative literature. She then obtained her master's degree from the College of Letters and Human Sciences of Rabat.

=== Works ===
During the 1970s El Assimi became the editor and publisher of the journal, al-Ikhtiyar (The Choice).

El Assimi also promotes Moroccan culture. She contributed to al-Thaqafa al-Maghribiyya (Moroccan Culture). In her works, she maintained that Moroccan folktales flourished during the French occupation because it was a source of pride and were used to oppose the colonizers. She noted that after Morocco's independence, this literary tradition became at risk because there was no more need for the preservation of oral indigenous culture. To address this, she has published works that sought to preserve folk tales such as in the case of Al-Hikayat al-Shabiya: Hikayat al-Nisa (Popular Tales: Tales of Women). This particular anthology included 240 folktales from Marrakesh.

As an outspoken feminist, she has written works that addressed political issues that concern women. These include al-Mar'a wa Ishkaliyyat al-Dimuqratiyya (Women and the Ambiguities of Democracy) and the collections of poetry, Kitabat Kharij Aswar al-'Alam (Writings Outside the Walls of the World), and Aswat Hanjara Mayyita (Voices from a Dead Throat). El Assimi's contribution to the change in the previous quasi-male monopoly in Moroccan poetry is attributed not to the use of "feminine voice" but to her ability to insert herself naturally into the current process of poetic renaissance in her country.

=== Politics ===
El Assimi maintained in al-Mar'a wa Ishkaliyyat al-Dimuqratiyya (Women and the Ambiguities of Democracy) that changing the status of women requires political commitment. She joined the Istiqlal Party and rose to become part of its executive committee. She ran as representative of the Marrakesh district and was elected on her second try.
