= Shimon Harush =

Israeli footballer

Shimon Harush שמעון הרוש
Personal information
- Full name: Shimon Harush
- Date of birth: 20 February 1987 (age 39)
- Place of birth: Kiryat Motzkin, Israel
- Height: 1.80 m (5 ft 11 in)
- Position: Left back

Team information
- Current team: Maccabi Kiryat Ata

Youth career
- Hapoel Haifa

Senior career*
Years	Team	Apps	(Gls)
2006–2009	Hapoel Haifa	44	(1)
2008–2009	→ Maccabi Ahi Nazareth (loan)	31	(0)
2009–2010	Hapoel Be'er Sheva	23	(1)
2010–2011	Hapoel Acre	23	(1)
2011–2012	Hapoel Be'er Sheva	14	(0)
2012–2013	Bnei Sakhnin	17	(2)
2013–2014	Hapoel Tel Aviv	22	(1)
2014–2016	Maccabi Netanya	37	(2)
2016–2017	F.C. Haifa Robi Shapira	26	(5)
2017	Ironi Nesher	8	(0)
2017–2019	Hapoel Iksal	18	(5)
2019	Hapoel Baqa al-Gharbiyye	4	(0)
2019–2020	Maccabi Tamra	14	(1)
2021	Ihud bnei majd al-Krum	1	(0)
2021	Maccabi Kiryat Ata	11	(1)
- * Club domestic league appearances and goals

Shimon Harush (Hebrew: שמעון הרוש; born 20 February 1987) is an Israeli footballer who currently plays for Maccabi Kiryat Ata.

== Career ==
Harush started his career at the youth department of Hapoel Haifa. He first played in the Israeli Premier League in 2009–10.

In January 2013 Harush signed at Hapoel Tel Aviv.
