= Gal Genish =

Israeli footballer

Gal Genish גל גניש
Personal information
- Full name: Gal Genish
- Date of birth: December 16, 1991 (age 34)
- Place of birth: Netanya, Israel
- Position: Defensive midfielder

Youth career
- Maccabi Netanya

Senior career*
Years	Team	Apps	(Gls)
2010–2012	Maccabi Netanya	9	(1)
2011–2012	→ Maccabi Ironi Bat Yam (loan)	19	(1)
2012–2013	Maccabi Ironi Kfar Yona	26	(5)
2013	Hapoel Hadera	4	(0)
2013–2014	Maccabi Ironi Kiryat Ata	15	(3)
2014–2015	Beitar Nahariya	23	(8)
2015	Hapoel Ironi Baqa al-Gharbiyye	3	(1)
2015–2016	Maccabi Daliyat al-Karmel	7	(1)
2016	Hapoel Shefa-'Amr	5	(0)
2016	Beitar Kfar Saba	13	(2)
2016–2017	Hapoel Mahane Yehuda	16	(2)
2017	Hapoel Beit She'an	6	(2)
2017–2018	F.C. Holon Yermiyahu	22	(0)
2018	Beitar Kfar Saba	5	(0)
2018–2019	Hapoel Bik'at HaYarden	4	(1)
2019	Hapoel Migdal HaEmek	7	(0)
- * Club domestic league appearances and goals

Gal Genish (Hebrew: גל גניש; born 16 December 1991) is an Israeli footballer.

== Honours ==
- Toto Cup (Leumit):
  - Runner-up (1): 2011
