= Marcin Cabaj =

Polish footballer

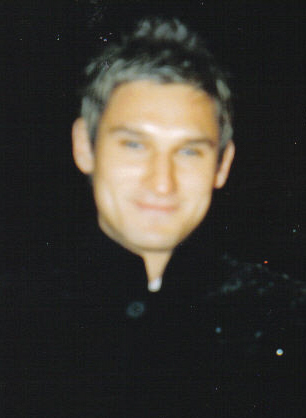

Personal information
- Full name: Marcin Grzegorz Cabaj
- Date of birth: 23 May 1980 (age 46)
- Place of birth: Kraków, Poland
- Height: 1.90 m (6 ft 3 in)
- Position: Goalkeeper

Team information
- Current team: Cracovia (goalkeeping coach)

Youth career
- Wanda Nowa Huta
- Krakus Nowa Huta

Senior career*
Years	Team	Apps	(Gls)
1999–2001	Górnik Łęczna		
2000–2001	→ KSZO Ostrowiec (loan)		
2002	Hutnik Kraków		
2002	Podbeskidzie Bielsko-Biała		
2003–2010	Cracovia	162	(0)
2011–2012	Hapoel Be'er Sheva	6	(0)
2012	Polonia Bytom	13	(0)
2012–2014	Sandecja Nowy Sącz	64	(0)
2014	Siarka Tarnobrzeg	0	(0)
2015	Poroniec Poronin	1	(0)
2015–2019	Garbarnia Kraków	110	(0)
2019–2021	Wiślanie Jaśkowice	40	(0)
- * Club domestic league appearances and goals

Marcin Grzegorz Cabaj (born 23 May 1980) is a Polish former professional footballer who played as a goalkeeper. He is currently the goalkeeping coach of Cracovia.

== Career ==
=== Club ===
His previous clubs have included Wanda Nowa Huta, Krakus Nowa Huta, Górnik Łęczna, KSZO Ostrowiec Świętokrzyski. He made his debut for Cracovia on 10 September 2004 against Górnik Zabrze.

In May 2011, he joined Israeli club Hapoel Be'er Sheva on a three-year contract. In his debut match against Hapoel Ironi Rishon Le-Zion, he saved a penalty. In early December 2011, he terminated his contract with the club immediately. The decision was made due to concerns for his safety, as the city of Beersheba, located near the Gaza Strip, was at the time the target of attacks by Palestinian organizations.

On 2 August 2019, Cabaj joined Wiślanie Jaśkowice.

== Honours ==
Cracovia

- III liga, group IV: 2002–03

Garbarnia Kraków

- III liga: 2015–16 (Lower Poland–Świętokrzyskie), 2016–17 (group IV)

Wiślanie Jaskowice

- IV liga Lesser Poland West: 2020–21
