= Arthur Atzianov =

Israeli footballer

Arthur Atzianov ארתור אטצזיאנוב
Personal information
- Full name: Arthur Atzianov
- Date of birth: March 3, 1991 (age 35)
- Place of birth: Israel
- Positions: Left winger; left back

Youth career
- 2003–2010: Hapoel Tel Aviv

Senior career*
Years	Team	Apps	(Gls)
2010–2013	Hapoel Tel Aviv	4	(1)
2012–2013	→ Hapoel Ramat Gan (loan)	21	(0)
Total		25	(1)

International career
2007–2008	Israel U17	13	(1)
2009	Israel U18	4	(2)
2009–2010	Israel U19	16	(1)
- * Club domestic league appearances and goals as of June 15, 2013

Arthur Atzianov (Hebrew: ארתור אטצזיאנוב; born March 3, 1991) is an Israeli footballer.

== Career ==
Atzianov grew up in the youth department of Hapoel Tel Aviv and was promoted to the senior team during 2010–11, getting his first appearances for the team in the Toto Cup and the State Cup, which Hapoel Tel Aviv eventually won.

During 2012–13, Atzianov was loaned to Hapoel Ramat Gan and helped the club win the State Cup before returning to Hapoel Tel Aviv. However, at the beginning of the training camp for the following season, Atzianov was diagnosed with a heart problem and had to retire from active football.

== Honours ==
- Israel State Cup (3):
  - 2010–11, 2011–12 (with Hapoel Tel Aviv), 2012–13 (with Hapoel Ramat Gan)
