= Amit Shumovich =

Israeli footballer

Amit Shumovich 'עמית שומוביץ
Personal information
- Full name: Amit Shumovich
- Date of birth: July 29, 1992 (age 34)
- Place of birth: Israel
- Position: Defender

Team information
- Current team: Dizengoff Tel Aviv

Youth career
- Beitar Ramat Gan
- 2007–2009: Maccabi Herzliya
- 2009–2010: Beitar Nes Tubruk
- 2010–2011: Maccabi Netanya

College career
Years	Team	Apps	(Gls)
2013	Boston College Eagles	10	(0)
2015	Columbia Lions	10	(1)

Senior career*
Years	Team	Apps	(Gls)
2011–2013	Maccabi Netanya	10	(1)
2017	Hapoel Afula	3	(0)
2022	HaMakhtesh Givatayim	10	(0)
2023–	Dizengoff Tel Aviv	23	(2)
- * Club domestic league appearances and goals as of 2 December 2024

Amit Shumovich (Hebrew: 'עמית שומוביץ; born July 29, 1992) is an Israeli footballer currently playing for Dizengoff Tel Aviv, he previously played for Maccabi Netanya.
