= Kfir Eizenstein =

Israeli footballer

Kfir Eizenstein כפיר איזנשטיין
Personal information
- Full name: Kfir Eizenstein
- Date of birth: February 18, 1993 (age 33)
- Place of birth: Tel Aviv, Israel
- Position: Right back

Team information
- Current team: Maccabi Jaffa
- Number: 19

Youth career
- Hapoel Tel Aviv

Senior career*
Years	Team	Apps	(Gls)
2010–2015	Hapoel Tel Aviv	2	(0)
2013	→ Maccabi Ironi Bat Yam (loan)	3	(0)
2014	→ Hapoel Ashkelon (loan)	1	(0)
2015	Maccabi Jaffa	7	(0)
- * Club domestic league appearances and goals

Kfir Eizenstein (Hebrew: כפיר איזנשטיין; born February 18, 1993) is a former Israeli footballer who played the position of right defender.
