= Ahmed Kasoum =

Israeli footballer

Ahmed Kasoum أحمد قاصوم
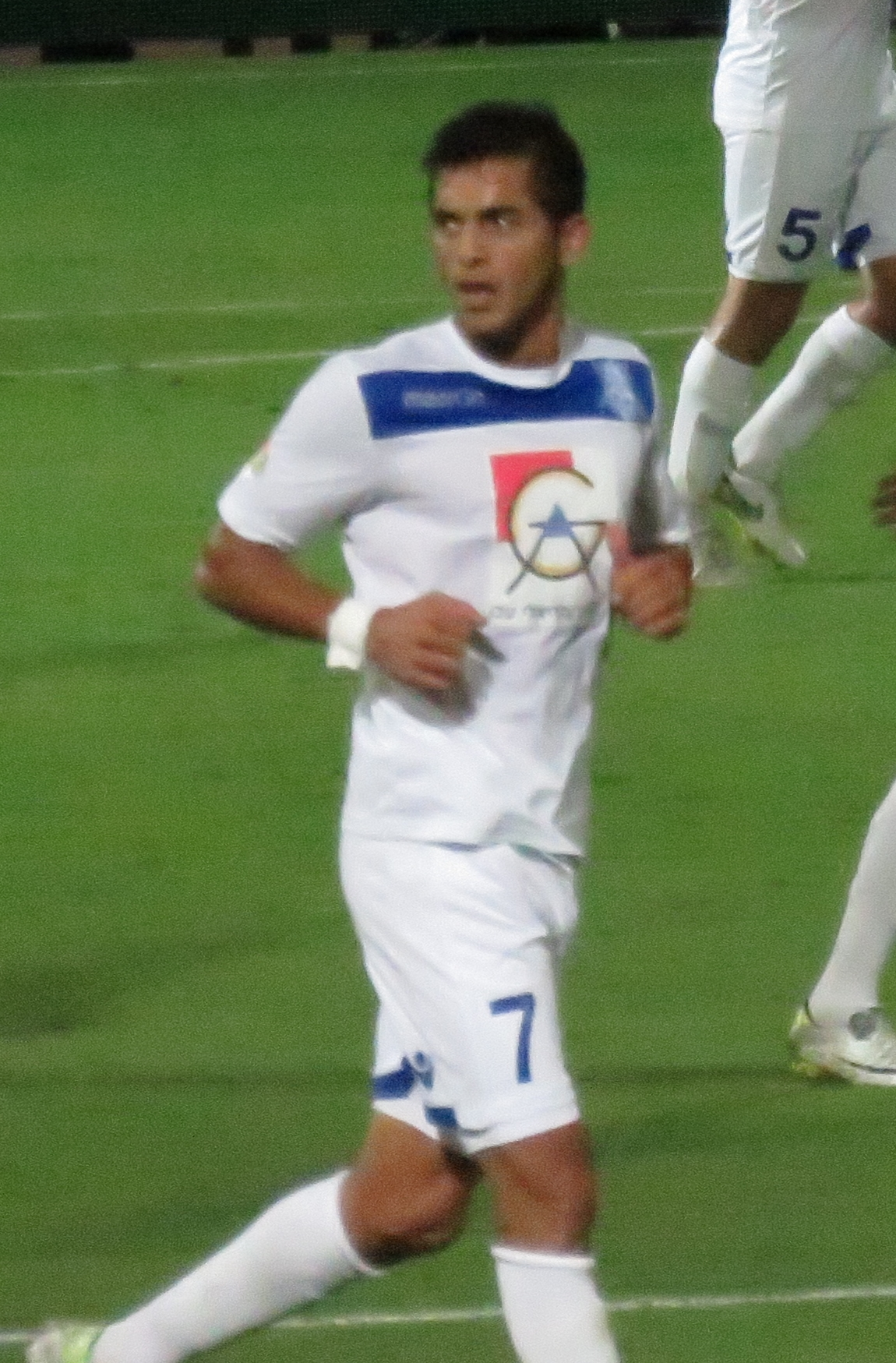
- Kasoum playing for Hapoel Acre in 2015

Personal information
- Full name: Ahmed Kasoum
- Date of birth: January 25, 1985 (age 41)
- Place of birth: I'billin, Israel
- Height: 1.73 m (5 ft 8 in)
- Position: Forward

Team information
- Current team: Ahva Arraba

Youth career
- 2001–2003: Ironi I'billin

Senior career*
Years	Team	Apps	(Gls)
2003–2006	Bnei Sakhnin	48	(8)
2006–2008	Hapoel Petah Tikva	29	(4)
2008	→ F.C. Ashdod (loan)	11	(0)
2009–2017	Bnei Sakhnin	183	(23)
2015–2017	→ Hapoel Acre (loan)	78	(3)
2017–2020	Hapoel Nazareth Illit	58	(2)
2020–2021	Maccabi Tamra	21	(2)
2021	Hapoel Kaukab	4	(0)
2021–2023	Maccabi Tamra	53	(10)
2023	Ahva Arraba	3	(0)

International career
2006	Israel U21	3	(0)
- * Club domestic league appearances and goals

Ahmed Kasoum (Arabic: أحمد قاصوم, Hebrew: אחמד קאסום; born January 25, 1985) is an Israeli former footballer.

After playing three professional seasons with Bnei Sakhnin, the club was relegated to the Liga Leumit (2nd tier). Instead of remaining with the club, Kasoum was bought by Hapoel Petah Tikva for a hefty sum of US $170,000. Having suffered a rash of injuries, Kasoum's playing time diminished at Hapoel. Following the club's relegation to the Liga Leumit, he was loaned to F.C. Ashdod, and after he returned to the club for the start of the 2008–09 season, he got back to Bnei Sakhnin in January 2009. Kasoum is a Bnei Sakhnin player who scored the most goals that a player in Bnei Sakhnin ever scored in Ligat Ha'al.

In February 2015, Kasoum joined Hapoel Acre on loan for the rest of the season.
