= Aviv Azaria =

Israeli footballer

Aviv Azaria אביב עזריה
Personal information
- Full name: Aviv Azaria
- Date of birth: November 2, 1991 (age 34)
- Place of birth: Netanya, Israel
- Position: Striker

Youth career
- 1998–2011: Maccabi Netanya

Senior career*
Years	Team	Apps	(Gls)
2009–2016	Maccabi Netanya	0	(0)
2011–2012	→ Hapoel Ramat Gan (loan)	27	(6)
2012–2013	→ Maccabi Herzliya (loan)	8	(0)
2014	→ Hapoel Beit She'an (loan)	12	(2)
2014–2015	→ Maccabi Jaffa (loan)	27	(1)
2015–2016	→ Hapoel Ihud Bnei Jatt (loan)	20	(17)
2016–2017	Bnei Qalansawe	3	(2)
2017–2018	Bnei Baqa	21	(11)
2019–2020	Maccabi HaSharon Netanya	4	(0)
- * Club domestic league appearances and goals

Aviv Azaria (Hebrew: אביב עזריה; born November 2, 1991) is an Israeli former footballer. He played for Hapoel Ihud Bnai Jatt.

== Club career statistics ==
(correct as of May 2012)

Club	Season	League			Cup			Toto Cup			Europe			Total		
Club	Season	Apps	Goals	Assists	Apps	Goals	Assists	Apps	Goals	Assists	Apps	Goals	Assists	Apps	Goals	Assists
Maccabi Netanya	2009–10	0	0	0	0	0	0	1	0	0	0	0	0	1	0	0
Maccabi Netanya	2010–11	0	0	0	0	0	0	0	0	0	0	0	0	0	0	0
Hapoel Ramat Gan (on loan)	2011–12	25	6	0	0	0	0	5	2	0	0	0	0	30	8	0
Hapoel Ramat Gan (on loan)	2012–13	2	0	0	0	0	0	1	0	0	0	0	0	3	0	0
Maccabi Herzliya (on loan)	2012–13	8	0	0	0	0	0	0	0	0	0	0	0	8	0	0
Career		33	6	0	0	0	0	7	2	0	0	0	0	42	8	0

== Honours ==
- Toto Cup (Leumit)
  - 2011
- Liga Leumit
  - 2011-12
