= Daniel Jammer =

German-Israeli businessman

- דניאל יאמר
- Born: 11 August 1966 (age 59); Frankfurt, Germany
- Occupation: Energy Cyber Security
- Spouse: Liza Jammer
- Children: 2

Daniel Jammer (Hebrew: דניאל יאמר; August 11, 1966) is a German-Israeli businessman. Jammer is the owner and founder of Nation-E, an international Israeli based ICT company specializing in developing energy solutions. He used to own Maccabi Netanya from 2006 to 2011 and also FC Senec from 2003 to 2007. In 2014, Jammer was dubbed one of the leading cyber security figures in Israel by Globes, Israel's leading business magazine.

== Life ==
Jammer worked fifteen years for the Titan-Industrie firma Tirus in Executive Position and is now founder of Micro Finance Invest.

== Personal ==
Jammer was raised in Frankfurt am Main. He lives with his wife Elizaveta Bresht, the daughter of Viatcheslav Bresht, a Russian Titan-Oligarch, and his two children's in Herzelia, Israel.
