= Mariano Caporale =

Argentine footballer

Personal information
- Full name: Mariano Carlos Caporale
- Date of birth: 11 January 1985 (age 41)
- Place of birth: Argentina
- Height: 1.78 m (5 ft 10 in)
- Position: Defender

Youth career
- 2000–2005: Argentinos Juniors

Senior career*
Years	Team	Apps	(Gls)
2006	Monterrey B		
2007–2008	Abahani Dhaka		
2009–2010	Atlético Bucaramanga		
2010	Defensa y Justicia	5	(0)
2010–2012	Maccabi Netanya	26	(0)
2012	Atlético Bucaramanga	11	(0)
2012–2014	Los Andes	24	(0)
- * Club domestic league appearances and goals

Mariano Caporale (born 11 January 1985) is a retired Argentine football player who played in Argentina, Mexico, Bangladesh and Israel.
