= Victor Merey =

Israeli footballer (born 1989)

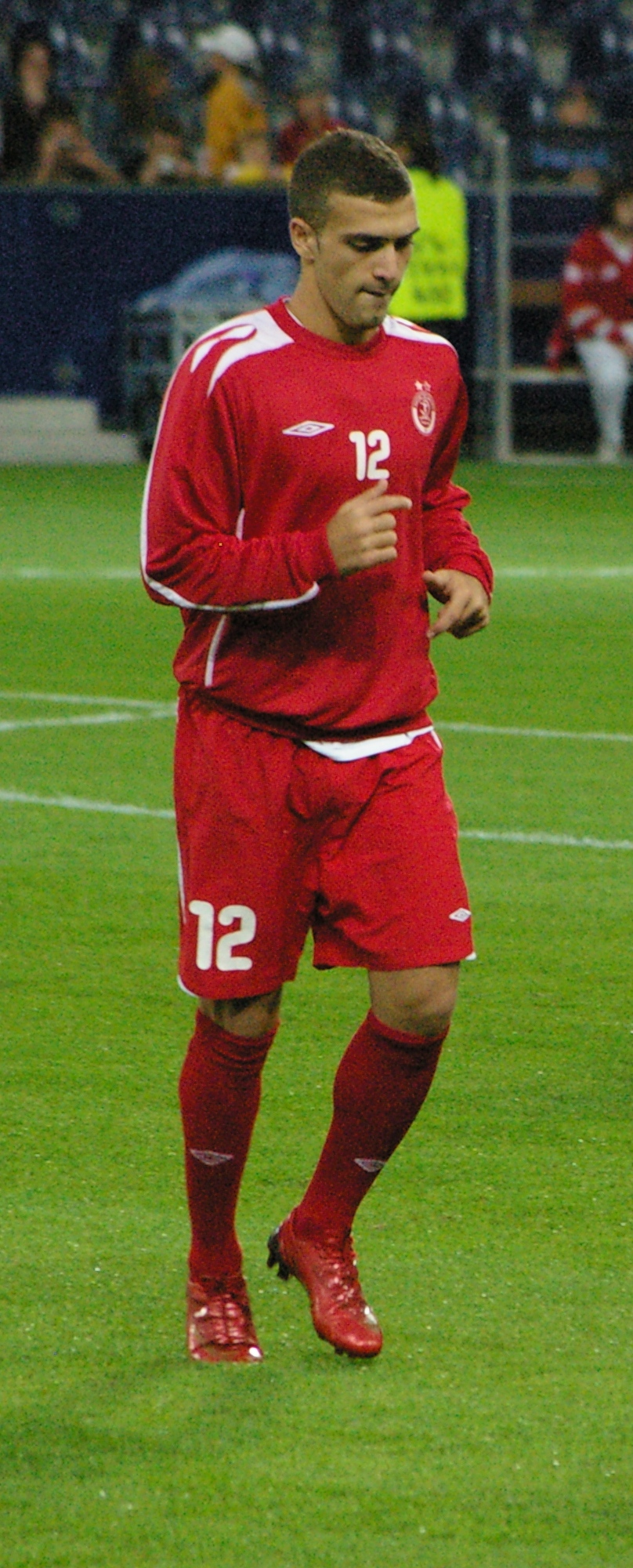
- Merey with Hapoel Tel Aviv in 2010

Personal information
- Date of birth: 31 May 1989 (age 37)
- Place of birth: Ar'ara, Israel
- Height: 1.77 m (5 ft 9 1/2 in)
- Position: Forward

Team information
- Current team: Ihud Bnei Baqa

Youth career
- Beitar Nes Tubruk

Senior career*
Years	Team	Apps	(Gls)
2009–2013	Hapoel Tel Aviv	60	(4)
2011–2012	→ Maccabi Petah Tikva	36	(9)
2013–2014	Maccabi Petah Tikva	38	(2)
2014–2015	Ironi Tiberias	18	(6)
2016	Shabab Dura	?	(?)
2016–2017	Hakoah Amidar Ramat Gan	23	(11)
2017–2020	Hapoel Bnei Lod	89	(12)
2020–2021	Maccabi Bnei Reineh	8	(1)
2021	F.C. Holon Yermiyahu	9	(1)
2021–2022	F.C. Tzeirei Tayibe	19	(5)
2023–	Ihud Bnei Baqa	39	(16)
- * Club domestic league appearances and goals as of 1 June 2025

Victor Merey (Arabic: فيكتور مرعي, Hebrew: ויקטור מרעי; born 31 May 1989) is an Israeli footballer who plays as a forward for Israeli club Ihud Bnei Baqa.

== Early life ==
Merey was born in Ar'ara, Israel, to a Muslim-Arab family.
