= Guy Levy =

Israeli footballer and manager

Guy Levy גיא לוי
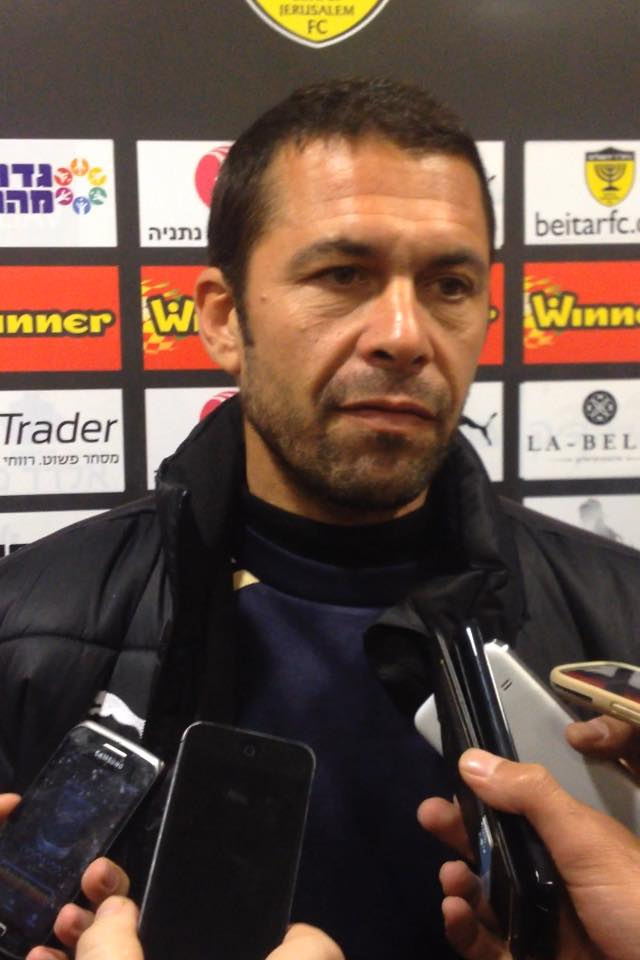
- Levy in 2015

Personal information
- Date of birth: September 8, 1966 (age 60)
- Place of birth: Petah Tikva, Israel
- Position: Defender

Senior career*
| Years | Team | Apps | (Gls) |
| 1982–1993 | Hapoel Petah Tikva | 154 | (3) |

Managerial career
- 1994–1996: Hapoel Petah Tikva
- 1996–1999: Tzafririm Holon
- 2000–2002: Hapoel Haifa
- 2002: Hapoel Kfar Saba
- 2003: Bnei Yehuda
- 2004–2008: Israel U21
- 2008–2009: Hapoel Be'er Sheva
- 2010: Ironi Nir Ramat HaSharon
- 2011: Apollon Limassol
- 2011–2012: Hapoel Be'er Sheva
- 2013–2014: Hapoel Ramat Gan
- 2014: Bnei Sakhnin
- 2015: Beitar Jerusalem
- 2015–2016: Hapoel Tel Aviv
- 2017: Hapoel Ra'anana
- * Club domestic league appearances and goals

Guy Levy (Hebrew: גיא לוי; born September 8, 1966), is an Israeli retired footballer who played as a defender. Today, Levy is a team manager that previously managed the Israel national under-21 football team.

== Career ==
Hapoel Tel Aviv appointed Levy as coach in November 2015.

== Honours ==
=== As a Player ===
- Israeli Premier League
  - Runner-up (3): 1988–89, 1989–90, 1990–91
- State Cup
  - Winner (1): 1992
  - Runner-up (1): 1991
- Toto Cup
  - Winner (3): 1985–86, 1989–90, 1990–91

=== As a Manager ===
- Israeli Second Division
  - Runner-up (1): 1997–98
- Toto Cup
  - Winner (1): 2000–01
- Toto Cup Leumit
  - Winner (1): 2008–09
- Qualified to 2007 UEFA European Under-21 Football Championship

== Personal life ==
He is the son of former Israel Football Association chairman, Gavri Levy.
