= Eyal Lahman =

Israeli football manager (born 1965)

Eyal Lahman אייל לחמן
Personal information
- Date of birth: 29 September 1965 (age 61)
- Place of birth: Petah Tikva, Israel

Youth career
- Years: Team
- Hapoel Petah Tikva
- Hapoel Mehane Yehuda
- Hapoel Petah Tikva

Managerial career
- 1990–1993: Hapoel Mahane Yehuda
- 1993–1994: Beitar Petah Tikva
- 1994–1995: Hapoel Givat Olga
- 1995–1998: Ironi Rishon LeZion
- 1998–1999: Maccabi Petah Tikva
- 1999: Hapoel Kfar Saba
- 2000: Hapoel Be'er Sheva
- 2001: Hapoel Beit She'an
- 2002–2003: Maccabi Herzliya
- 2003–2004: Bnei Sakhnin
- 2005–2006: Ironi Kiryat Shmona
- 2006–2007: Hapoel Petah Tikva
- 2007: Hapoel Acre
- 2008: Hearts of Oak
- 2008: Maccabi Herzliya
- 2008–2009: Bnei Sakhnin
- 2009: AEP Paphos
- 2010: Ahva Arraba
- 2010–2011: Hapoel Ra'anana
- 2011–2012: Maccabi Petah Tikva
- 2012–2013: Hapoel Rishon LeZion
- 2014: Hapoel Ashkelon
- 2015: F.C. Ashdod
- 2015–2017: Hapoel Afula
- 2017: Maccabi Herzliya
- 2020: Hapoel Ra'anana
- 2023-2026 zambia national team - assistant coach

Eyal Lahman (Hebrew: אייל לחמן; born 29 September 1965) is an Israeli football manager.

== Biography ==
Born in Petah Tikva, Lahman joined the Hapoel Petah Tikva youth system, but left the club at 16 to join Petah Tikva-based Hapoel Mahane Yehuda. He returned to Hapoel Petah Tikva aged 18, but never played for the senior team.

In 1983, he was appointed manager of the children's team. He moved to Bnei Yehuda, where he coached the youth team. In 1989, he became youth team coach at Maccabi Petah Tikva.

He was given his first full managerial position by Hapoel Mahane Yehuda in 1991. In 1993, he became Beitar Petah Tikva manager, before moving the Hapoel Givat Olga the following year. In 1995, he was appointed manager of Ironi Rishon LeZion, leading the club to the State Cup final in 1996, though they lost to Maccabi Tel Aviv. In 1998, he moved on to Maccabi Petah Tikva, before joining Hapoel Kfar Saba the following season. After six matches of the 1999–2000 season he left the club and later joined Hapoel Be'er Sheva.

During the following season he left Be'er Sheva and joined Hapoel Beit She'an. The season after, he joined Maccabi Herzliya, where he remained until 2003.

In 2003, he joined Bnei Sakhnin, who had just been promoted to the Premier League. Lahman led the club to survival, and their first State Cup final, which they won, qualifying them for Europe. However, he left the club in 2004.

In 2006, he joined Hapoel Petah Tikva, who were relegated. He started the 2007–08 season at Hapoel Acre, but left the club after 14 matches. In February 2008 he joined Hearts of Oak, but returned to Israel later in the year to manage Maccabi Herzliya. After eight matches he quit this position in order to become the manager of Bnei Sakhnin.

In June 2009 he signed for one year with AEP Paphos, but in September after just three months with the club he was sacked after one game.

In May 2010 he signed a contract with Hapoel Ra'anana.

On 18 October 2011, he signed a contract with Maccabi Petah Tikva, and on 21 January 2012 he resigned from the club.

On 30 January 2012, he signed with Hapoel Rishon LeZion.

== Honours ==
- Israel State Cup:
  - Winner (1): 2003–04
  - Runner-up (1): 1995–96
