= Amos Kollie =

Liberian footballer

Personal information
- Full name: Amos Kollie
- Date of birth: July 18, 1990 (age 36)
- Place of birth: Monrovia, Liberia
- Position: Striker

Team information
- Current team: Hapoel Kfar Saba
- Number: 23

Youth career
- LISCR

Senior career*
Years	Team	Apps	(Gls)
2008–2010	LISCR	?	(?)
2010–2011	Hapoel Nazareth Illit	15	(7)
2011–2012	Hapoel Haifa	4	(0)
2012	→ Hapoel Kfar Saba (loan)	13	(3)
2012–2013	Beitar Tel Aviv Ramla	13	(1)
- * Club domestic league appearances and goals as of 6 February 2012

Amos Kollie (born 18 July 1990) is a Liberian footballer currently playing for Hapoel Kfar Saba.

== Career ==
=== Club ===
Kollie started his professional career with boyhood club, LISCR. After 2 years he signed with the Israeli side Hapoel Nazareth Illit.

On August 26, 2011, Kollie signed a contract with Hapoel Haifa.
