= Eliran Danin =

Israeli footballer

Eliran Danin אלירן דנין
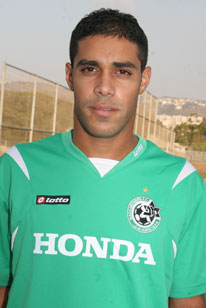

Personal information
- Full name: Eliran Danin
- Date of birth: March 29, 1984 (age 42)
- Place of birth: Netanya, Israel
- Height: 1.72 m (5 ft 7 1/2 in)
- Position: Left back

Youth career
- 1998–2002: Beitar Nes Tubruk

Senior career*
Years	Team	Apps	(Gls)
2003–2010	Beitar Jerusalem	93	(0)
2006–2007	→ Hapoel Kfar Saba (loan)	14	(1)
2007–2008	→ Maccabi Haifa (loan)	11	(0)
2010–2011	Maccabi Petah Tikva	23	(0)
2011–2012	Hapoel Acre	32	(0)
2012–2013	Hapoel Tel Aviv	10	(0)
2013–2014	Hapoel Acre	5	(0)
2014–2015	Hapoel Ashkelon	11	(0)
2015–2017	Hapoel Afula	26	(0)
2017–2018	Hapoel Marmorek	19	(0)

International career
2003	israel U19	3	(1)
2004–2007	Israel U21	19	(0)
2010	Israel	1	(0)
- * Club domestic league appearances and goals as of 8 January 2017

Eliran Danin (Hebrew: אלירן דנין; born March 29, 1984) is a retired Israeli footballer.

== Honours ==
- Israel State Cup (1):
  - 2009
- Toto Cup (1):
  - 2009-10
- Liga Alef (1)
  - 2014-15
