= Bnei Sakhnin F.C. =

Association football club in Israel

Bnei Sakhnin
- Full name: Ihoud Bnei Sakhnin F.C.
- Founded: 1991; 35 years ago
- Ground: Doha Stadium, Sakhnin
- Capacity: 8,500
- Chairman: Khaled Qassoum
- Manager: Yossi Abukasis
- League: Israeli Premier League
- 2025–26: Israeli Premier League, 11th of 14
- Website: sakhninfc.com
Home colours	Away colours

Bnei Sakhnin F.C. (Arabic: اتحاد أبناء سخنين, romanized: Ittiḥād ’Abnā’ Saḫnīn, Hebrew: איחוד בני סכנין, romanized: Iḥud Bnei Sakhnin, lit. 'Sons of Sakhnin United') is a Palestinian Israeli professional football club based at the Doha Stadium in Sakhnin. They are the most successful club among the Palestinian Israeli clubs in the country, having won the State Cup in 2004. The club was formed in 1991 by a merger of Maccabi Sakhnin and Hapoel Sakhnin. The majority of its fans are Palestinians living in Israel.

== History ==
A chart showing the progress of Bnei Sakhnin through the Israeli football league system, from 1994–95 to the present

=== Early years ===
Bnei Sakhnin was formed in 1991 by a merger of Maccabi Sakhnin and Hapoel Sakhnin. They were promoted to Liga Artzit (then the second tier) in 1997. In 1998–99 they finished in the relegation zone, but were reprieved when Maccabi Jaffa, who had finished bottom of the top division, were relegated three leagues due to financial problems.

In 2002–03 the club finished as runners-up and promoted alongside fellow Palestinian Israeli club Maccabi Ahi Nazareth, becoming the joint-second Palestinian Israeli club to play in the top flight after Hapoel Tayibe. Promotion was only won on the last day of the season, the club overtaking Hapoel Jerusalem when they won 1–0 away to Maccabi Kiryat Gat, whilst Hapoel were held to a 0–0 draw at Hapoel Ra'anana.

Prior to their first season in the top division, Sakhnin were favourites to be relegated, and it was thought that Nazareth had a better chance of survival. Questions remained as to whether the squad that gained promotion would be able to compete at the top level, along with the added pressures not to become the next Hapoel Taibe (who were relegated in their first season in the top flight, and subsequently suffered financial problems leading to repeated relegations thereafter). They also lost manager Momy Zafran who resigned shortly after the club won promotion, replacing him with Eyal Lahman. In addition, the club had to play games in Haifa's Kiryat Eliezer Stadium, as their home ground in Sakhnin was deemed unfit for the Premier League.

=== Later successes ===
The club signed former Maccabi Haifa striker Raffi Cohen and loaned another striker, Lior Asulin from Maccabi Herzliya. Sagi Strauss was brought in to mind the nets from Maccabi Petah Tikva. Despite the gloomy predictions, the club defied the odds, eventually finishing 10th, four points clear of relegation, whilst Nazareth finished bottom. However, the highlight of the season was the State Cup victory, also a first by an Palestinian Israeli club. In the final, Sakhnin beat surprise finalists, second division side Hapoel Haifa 4–1. The team gained a reputation for being a tough, combative outfit, similar in style to the Crazy Gang period at English club Wimbledon. Captain and club stalwart Abbas Suan (he had been at the club since its formation, having been part of the Hapoel Sakhnin team since 1994) won particular acclaim, gaining a call-up to the Israel squad, and winning his first cap in February 2004.

The cup win meant that the club became the first Palestinian Israeli team to play in Europe, entering the UEFA Cup. After beating Partizani Tirana 6–1 on aggregate in the second qualifying round, the club faced Newcastle United in the first round. However, Sakhnin were beaten 7–1 on aggregate, including a 5–1 home defeat in a match played at the Ramat Gan Stadium in Tel Aviv District due to security concerns.

During the 2004–05 season, with its stadium still under development the club played many of its home matches at Hapoel Nazareth Illit's Municipal Stadium.

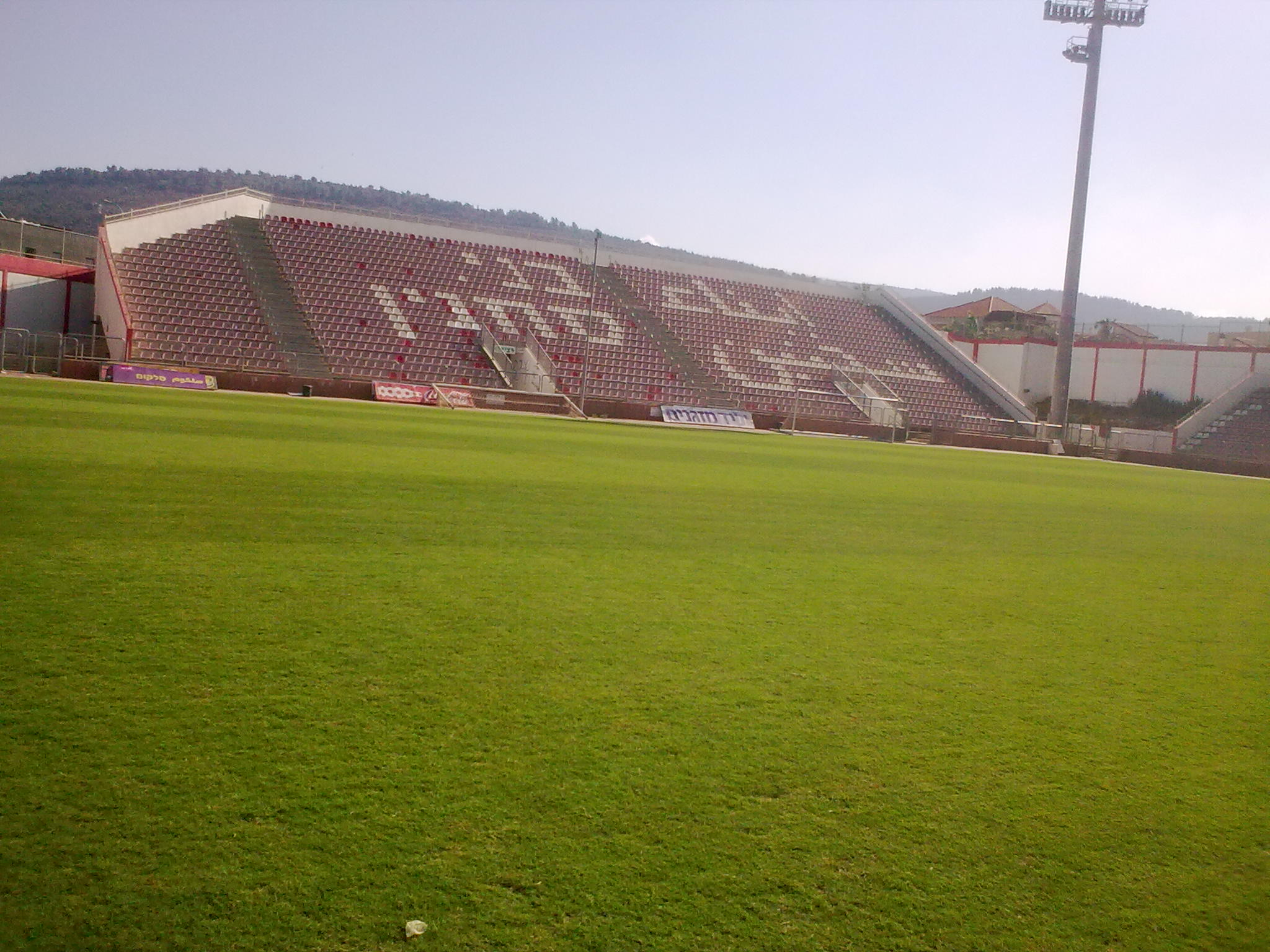
The Doha Stadium was funded in part by Qatar and was opened in 2006

During their spell in the top flight, several Sakhnin games were plagued by hooliganism. At the annual Land Day ceremony in Sakhnin in the year of 2000, a large crowd of Palestinian citizens were unexplainably tear gassed. Political power controlled not only the population, but the atmosphere at soccer games as well. Studies have shown that Palestinian Israeli males who attended soccer games were less likely to be proud of their Palestinian descent. In 2000, Sakhnin's first game was delayed for weeks, though when the game did come about, the visiting Jewish team received flowers. Though events (such as this) coated by such turmoil aggravated those who resided in Sakhnin, their people still attempted to use the soccer stadium as an outlet to ease the relations with those who brought political unrest and corruption.

Despite chairman Ghnaim's stated mission to create a "cultural rainbow" from his football club, games against Beitar Jerusalem were particularly violent, at least partially due to the presence of notoriously anti-Arab supporters of Beitar; when Sakhnin won the State Cup, Beitar fans paid for an obituary to be printed in Israel's leading daily Yedioth Ahronoth, claiming that Israeli football was dead. On 29 January 2005 Sakhnin fans rioted during a home match (played at Kiryat Eliezer) against Hapoel Tel Aviv after a violent incident on the field between a team official and a referee, who had earlier had sent off two Sakhnin players. As a punishment, the IFA ordered the club to play two games behind closed doors.

Despite a large cash injection made by Israeli businessman Arcadi Gaydamak ($400,000) in the hope of promoting peace and harmony among the citizens of Israel, and a return to their rebuilt home stadium (largely financed by the Emir of Qatar, hence the renaming to Doha Stadium), Sakhnin were relegated at the end of 2005–06 season, finishing nine points from safety.

However, with one of the largest budgets in the division (around five and a half million shekels), the club were amongst the favourites to return quickly to the Premier League, and did so by finishing as runners-up to Kiryat Shmona. In their first season back in the Premier League, they finished fourth, their highest ever league position, qualifying for the Intertoto Cup. Problems due to political unrest in the region caused the club's leadership to ask for the postponement of Intertoto cup matches in the Summer of 2008, Most of the stars of the team were sold, most notably Maor Buzaglo who signed for Maccabi Tel Aviv.

In the 2018–19 season the club ended dead last. After repromotion one year later the club's 2020–21 season started off painfully, with the first match ending in a 3–0 home loss to Bnei Yehuda. The next week, some of the team's players and management team had to quarantine as a result of COVID-19 pandemic precautions, and they played their away match against Maccabi Netanya with several absent players and no coach. After suffering a 7–0 loss, the greatest defeat in the club's history, the Sakhnin chairman left the administrative division of Ligat Ha'al. Despite a horrible start with just one point after the first six matches and closing the season with four more losses the club could avoid relegation by being one point better than Bnei Yehuda.

== In popular culture ==
The rise of the Bnei Sakhnin F.C. was the subject of a popular documentary film by noted Israeli director Ram Loevy.

The team is also the subject of the critically acclaimed 2010 documentary film After The Cup: Sons of Sakhnin United directed by American Christopher Browne, which follows the team after they win the Israel State Cup.

Bnei Sakhnin is also mentioned in the popular Israeli rap song ״רעל עכברים״ (rat poison) by popular Israeli rapper mc fitusi where he says ״הסיכוי שהם ידעו מה בשקיות נמוך כמו בני סכנין בליגת האלופות״ (the chance they’ll realise what’s in the bags is as low as Bnei Sakhnin in the champions league) this reference was met with some backlash with some fans describing it as racist towards Arabs, so he later apologised and changed the line.

== Sponsorship ==
During the 2005–06 season, the club signed a shirt sponsorship deal with Israeli mobile phone company Cellcom.

The club's budget was bolstered on 15 June 2006 when Gaydamak announced that he would donate two million shekels to the club in hope that they will make a return to Israel's top league.

== Support ==
The majority of fans of Bnei Sakhnin are Palestinian citizens living in Israel. The Bnei Sakhnin fan club is called Ultras Sakhnin 2003 (US03) or Duha Gate 4–5 (named due to the gate numbers that leads to their stand), it was established in 2003 after they got promoted to the top division. Other fan clubs that they have friendship with is Ultras Hapoel 99 fans of Hapoel Tel Aviv F.C., Ultrà Sankt Pauli 2002 of FC St. Pauli and Ultras Winners 2005 of Wydad Casablanca.

Big matches (especially those against rival club Beitar Jerusalem) can attract large crowds but toward the end of the 2005–06 season when the club was set to be relegated, the attendance at matches declined dramatically. The highest attendance ever to be in a match of Sakhnin was at the 2004 Israel State Cup Final when Ramat Gan Stadium was filled with Palestinian Israeli supporters from Galilee to the far Negev which all of them came to support the club.

On 1 September 2024, violent clashes broke out during a match between Bnei Sakhnin and Hapoel Beersheba after Palestinian fans of Bnei Sakhnin turned their backs during the national anthem Hatikvah. Twelve people were arrested, and the match was cancelled. When the two teams matched up in the previous season, Bnei Sakhnin fans also whistled and booed during the national anthem.

== Players ==
=== Current squad ===
As of 23 August 2026

No.	Pos.	Nation	Player
1	GK	ROU	Raul Bălbărău
2	DF	ISR	Maroun Gantous
5	DF	ISR	Eyad Abu Abaid
6	DF	ISR	Ahmed Taha
7	FW	ISR	Itamar Shviro
8	MF	LTU	Modestas Vorobjovas
9	FW	ROU	Daniel Paraschiv
10	MF	GHA	Mathew Cudjoe
11	MF	ISR	Jubayer Bushnak
16	FW	ISR	Loai Helf
17	DF	ISR	Amit Karadi (on loan from Maccabi Tel Aviv)
20	DF	ISR	Mohamad Ganame

No.	Pos.	Nation	Player
21	MF	ISR	Mohamed Abu Riya
22	GK	ISR	Mohammed Abu Nil
24	FW	ISR	Baseel Khoury
28	MF	ISR	Ilay Hagag (on loan from Beitar Jerusalem)
29	FW	ISR	Ahmed Salman
32	GK	ISR	Majid Suleiman
44	DF	ISR	Ali Gnameh
77	MF	ROU	Antonio Sefer (on loan from Maccabi Bnei Reineh)
92	DF	GBS	Saná
97	DF	GLP	Dimitri Cavaré
—	DF	NED	Leeroy Owusu
—	MF	ISR	Niv Livnat
—	FW	ISR	Shaker Abu Husein

=== Out on loan ===
No.	Pos.	Nation	Player

=== Foreign players (2024–25) ===
Only up to six non-Israeli nationals can be in an Israeli club squad. Those with Jewish ancestry, married to an Israeli, or have played in Israel for an extended period of time (e.g. Gustavo Boccoli), can claim a passport or permanent residency which would allow them to play with Israeli status.

- (Belgium) Stéphane Oméonga
- (Cyprus) Constantinos Soteriou
- (Cameroon) Jeando Fuchs
- (Madagascar) Alexandre Ramalingom

== Coaching staff ==
Position	Name
Manager	(Serbia) Slobodan Drapić
Assistant Manager	(Israel) Salah Hasarma

== Managers ==
- (Israel) Azmi Nassar (1999–00)
- (Israel) Momi Zafran (2002–2005)
- (Israel) Eyal Lahman (2003–2005)
- (Israel) Momi Zafran (2005)
- (Israel) Michael Kadosh (2005–2006)
- (Israel) Elisha Levy (1 July 2006 – 30 June 2008)
- (Israel) Freddy David (1 July 2008 – 2008)
- (Israel) Eyal Lahman (2008–09)
- (Israel) Eran Kulik (2009 – 19 Oct 2009)
- (Israel) Marco Balbul (21 Oct 2009 – 30 June 2010)
- (Israel) Yuval Naim (1 July 2010 – 11 Aug 2010)
- (Israel) Haim Levy (2010)
- (Israel) (Serbia) Slobodan Drapić (2010–11)
- (Israel) Shlomi Dora (4 April 2011 – 10 March 2013)
- (Israel) Marco Balbul (11 March 2013 – 19 June 2014)
- (Israel) Guy Levy (19 June 2014)
- (Israel) Eli Cohen (2014–2015)
- (Israel) Yossi Abukasis (2015–2017)
- (Brazil) Jairo Swirsky (2017)
- (Israel) Aiman Khalaila (caretaker) (2017)
- (Israel) Felix Naim (2017)
- (Israel) Tal Banin (2018)
- (Israel) Benny Ben Zaken (2018)
- (Israel) Amir Turgeman (2018–2019)
- (Israel) (Georgia (country)) Giorgi Daraselia (2019)
- (Israel) Eldad Shavit (2019)
- (Israel) Nissan Yehezkel (2019)
- (Israel) Nisso Avitan (2020)
- (Israel) Sharon Mimer (2020–2021)
- (Israel) Haim Silvas (2021–2022)
- (Israel) Kobi Refua (2022–2023)
- (Israel) (Serbia) Slobodan Drapić (2023–2025)
- (Israel) Meni Koretski (2025)
- (Israel) Sharon Mimer (2025–2026)
- (Israel) Yossi Abukasis (2026–)

== Titles ==
- State Cup
  - Winners (1): 2003–04
- Toto Cup
  - Runners-up (1): 2020–21

== Records ==
- Most League Goals: 31 Ahmed Kasoum,(2003–2006; 2009–2014)
- Most League Goals in a Season (individual): 16 Oren Muharer, Liga Leumit, 2000–01
- Most Goals scored in a match: 3 Samir Zampir v SK Nes Ziona, 6 March 1999 / 3 Wissam Isami v Hapoel Bat Yam, 21 May 1999 / 3 Oren Muharer v Hapoel Jerusalem, 31 October 1999 / 3 Shlomi Azulay v Maccabi Haifa, 2 April 2016 / 3 Shlomi Azulay v Beitar Jerusalem, 1 May 2016
- Most League Goals in a Season (team): 60 2011/12
