= List of Israeli football transfers summer 2014 =

This is a list of Israeli football transfers for the 2014 summer transfer window

== Ligat Ha'Al ==
=== Maccabi Tel Aviv ===
In:

| No. | Pos. | Nation | Player |
|---|---|---|---|
| — | GK | ISR | Yossi Ginzburg (was on loan to (Israel) Sektzia Nes Tziona) |
| — | GK | ISR | Tomer Chencinski (was on loan to (Israel) Hakoah Amidar Ramat Gan) |
| — | DF | ISR | Yuval Spungin (from (Belgium) Mons) |
| — | DF | ISR | Reef Peretz (was on loan to (Israel) Hapoel Nir Ramat HaSharon) |
| — | DF | ISR | Yagil Biton (was on loan to (Israel) Hapoel Nir Ramat HaSharon) |
| — | MF | ISR | Ben Reichert (from (Israel) Hapoel Nir Ramat HaSharon) |
| — | MF | ISR | Moshe Lugasi (was on loan to (Israel) Beitar Jerusalem) |
| — | MF | ISR | Ruslan Berski (was on loan to (Israel) Maccabi Kabilio Jaffa) |
| — | MF | ISR | Hasan Abu Zaid (was on loan to (Cyprus) AEK Larnaca) |
| — | MF | NGA | Nosa Igiebor (from (Spain) Real Betis) |
| — | FW | ISR | Ben Ben Yair (was on loan to (Israel) Hapoel Nir Ramat HaSharon) |
| — | FW | NGA | Lanry Kahinda (was on loan to (Israel) Hakoah Amidar Ramat Gan) |
| — | FW | ISR | Eden Ben Basat (from (France) Toulouse) |

Out:

| No. | Pos. | Nation | Player |
|---|---|---|---|
| — | GK | ISR | Yossi Ginzburg (to (Israel) Hakoah Amidar Ramat Gan) |
| — | GK | ISR | Tomer Chencinski (to (Israel) Hapoel Nir Ramat HaSharon) |
| — | GK | ISR | Matan Amber (to (Israel) Hapoel Rishon LeZion) |
| — | DF | ISR | Yagil Biton (to (Israel) Maccabi Herzliya) |
| — | DF | ISR | Reef Peretz (on loan to (Israel) Hapoel Petah Tikva) |
| — | DF | FRA | Rémi Maréval (Free Agent) |
| — | MF | ISR | Ruslan Berski (to (Israel) Hapoel Jerusalem) |
| — | MF | ISR | Hasan Abu Zaid (on loan to (Israel) Maccabi Petah Tikva) |
| — | MF | ISR | Omri Altman (on loan to (Israel) Hapoel Petah Tikva) |
| — | MF | ISR | Daniel Gretz (on loan to (Israel) Maccabi Yavne) |
| — | MF | ISR | Moshe Lugasi (on loan to (Israel) Maccabi Petah Tikva) |
| — | FW | ISR | Ben Ben Yair (on loan to (Israel) Maccabi Petah Tikva) |
| — | FW | NGA | Lanry Kahinda (on loan to (Israel) Hapoel Afula) |
| — | FW | ISR | Dor Jan (on loan to (Israel) Hapoel Ironi Kiryat Shmona) |

=== Hapoel Be'er Sheva ===
In:

| No. | Pos. | Nation | Player |
|---|---|---|---|
| — | GK | ISR | Robi Levkovich (from (Israel) Maccabi Netanya) |
| — | DF | ISR | Dor Malul (from (Israel) Beitar Jerusalem) |
| — | DF | ISR | Joakim Askling (from (Israel) Hapoel Kfar Saba) |
| — | MF | ISR | Roei Gordana (from (Israel) Hapoel Tel Aviv) |
| — | MF | ISR | Maor Melikson (from (France) Valenciennes) |
| — | MF | ISR | Firas Awad (was on loan to (Israel) Hapoel Bnei Lod) |
| — | MF | NGA | John Ugochukwu (from (Portugal) Académica) |
| — | MF | ROU | Ovidiu Hoban (from (Romania) Petrolul Ploiești) |
| — | FW | ISR | Shlomi Arbeitman (from (Belgium) Mons) |

Out:

| No. | Pos. | Nation | Player |
|---|---|---|---|
| — | GK | ISR | Shlomi Ben Hemo (Free Agent) |
| — | DF | ISR | Ben Turjeman (on loan to (Israel) Hapoel Acre) |
| — | DF | ISR | Ben Grabli (on loan to (Israel) Hapoel Nir Ramat HaSharon) |
| — | MF | ISR | Lotem Zino (to (Switzerland) Thun) |
| — | MF | ISR | Yoni Uzan (on loan to (Israel) Hapoel Jerusalem) |
| — | MF | BEL | David Hubert (was on loan from (Belgium) Gent) |
| — | MF | ISR | Amir Kubni (to (Israel) F.C. Be'er Sheva) |
| — | MF | ISR | Amit Hefer (on loan to (Israel) Maccabi Ironi Netivot) |
| — | MF | ISR | Firas Awad (on loan to (Israel) Maccabi Kiryat Gat) |
| — | MF | ISR | Dror Tazazo (to (Israel) Hakoah Amidar Ramat Gan) |
| — | MF | ISR | Kobi Dajani (Free Agent) |
| — | FW | ISR | Nicolás Falczuk (to (Israel) Maccabi Petah Tikva) |
| — | FW | NED | Glynor Plet (to (Belgium) Zulte Waregem) |
| — | FW | ISR | Tomer Ohana (to (Israel) Maccabi Yavne) |
| — | FW | ISR | Tomer Swisa (on loan to (Israel) Beitar Jerusalem) |
| — | FW | ISR | Ido Exbard (to (Israel) Maccabi Ahi Nazareth) |

=== Hapoel Ironi Kiryat Shmona ===
In:

| No. | Pos. | Nation | Player |
|---|---|---|---|
| — | GK | ISR | Mahadi Zuabi (on loan from (Israel) Beitar Nes Tubruk) |
| — | DF | SUR | Touvarno Pinas (from (Israel) Maccabi Netanya) |
| — | DF | ISR | Gal Mayo (on loan from (Israel) Hapoel Rishon LeZion) |
| — | MF | ISR | Yinon Eliyahu (from (Israel) Maccabi Kiryat Malakhi) |
| — | MF | ISR | Ehud Ma'arvi (was on loan to (Israel) Hapoel Afula) |
| — | MF | ISR | Ahad Azam (from (Israel) Hapoel Haifa) |
| — | FW | ISR | Dor Jan (on loan from (Israel) Maccabi Tel Aviv) |

Out:

| No. | Pos. | Nation | Player |
|---|---|---|---|
| — | DF | ISR | Matan Ohayon (to (Israel) Maccabi Haifa) |
| — | DF | ISR | Arad Elbaz (on loan to (Israel) Hapoel F.C. Karmiel Safed) |
| — | DF | ISR | Eliyahu Balilti (on loan to (Israel) Hapoel Afula) |
| — | DF | ISR | Noam Kalmanovich (on loan to (Israel) Maccabi Ironi Kiryat Ata) |
| — | MF | ISR | Naor Abudi (on loan to (Israel) Hapoel Nazareth Illit) |
| — | MF | ISR | Yinon Eliyahu (on loan to (Israel) Maccabi Herzliya) |
| — | MF | ISR | Ehud Ma'arvi (on loan to (Israel) Hapoel F.C. Karmiel Safed) |
| — | FW | ISR | Weaam Amasha (was on loan from (Israel) Maccabi Haifa) |

=== Hapoel Tel Aviv ===
In:

| No. | Pos. | Nation | Player |
|---|---|---|---|
| — | GK | ISR | Tom Almadon (from (Israel) Bnei Yehuda Tel Aviv) |
| — | DF | ISR | Obieda Khateb (from (Israel) Hakoah Amidar Ramat Gan) |
| — | DF | NGA | Francis Benjamin (from (Nigeria) Heartland) |
| — | DF | ISR | Sari Falah (from (Israel) Maccabi Haifa) |
| — | MF | ISR | Omer Peretz (from (Israel) Maccabi Jaffa) |
| — | MF | ISR | Aviv Dedo (from (Israel) Hapoel Asi Gilboa) |
| — | MF | ISR | Gal Malka (from (Israel) Maccabi Netanya) |
| — | MF | ISR | Phillip Manneh (was on loan to (Israel) Beitar Tel Aviv Ramla) |
| — | MF | ISR | Ariel Lazmi (from (Israel) Ironi Tiberias) |
| — | MF | NGA | Harmony Ikande (from (Ukraine) Hoverla Uzhorod) |
| — | MF | ISR | Moshe Ohayon (from (Cyprus) Anorthosis) |
| — | FW | ISR | Eden Shrem (was on loan to (Israel) Hapoel Rishon LeZion) |
| — | FW | ISR | Shlomi Azulay (from (Israel) Maccabi Haifa) |
| — | FW | CMR | Gaël Etock (from (Portugal) Sporting CP) |

Out:

| No. | Pos. | Nation | Player |
|---|---|---|---|
| — | GK | ISR | Boris Klaiman (to (Israel) Beitar Jerusalem) |
| — | GK | ISR | Ariel Talias (to (Israel) F.C. Giv'at Olga) |
| — | DF | ISR | Shimon Harush (to (Israel) Maccabi Netanya) |
| — | DF | ISR | Yigal Antebi (Retired) |
| — | DF | SVN | Branko Ilić (to (Serbia) FK Partizan) |
| — | DF | ISR | Ze'ev Haimovich (to (Israel) Beitar Jerusalem) |
| — | DF | ISR | Uri Cohen (on loan to (Israel) Hapoel Acre) |
| — | DF | ISR | Orel Dgani (was on loan from (Israel) Maccabi Haifa) |
| — | MF | ISR | Roei Gordana (to (Israel) Hapoel Be'er Sheva) |
| — | MF | MKD | Besart Abdurahimi (was on loan from (Croatia) NK Zagreb) |
| — | MF | ISR | Salim Tuama (to (Israel) Hapoel Bnei Lod) |
| — | MF | ISR | Bryan Gerzicich (to (Israel) Maccabi Petah Tikva) |
| — | MF | ISR | Evyatar Yaguni (on loan to (Israel) Sektzia Nes Tziona) |
| — | MF | ISR | Omer Peretz (on loan to (Israel) Hapoel Nir Ramat HaSharon) |
| — | FW | MNE | Petar Orlandić (was on loan from (Montenegro) FK Zeta) |
| — | FW | ISR | Ran Itzhak (to (Israel) Hapoel Kfar Saba) |
| — | FW | ISR | Omer Fadida (on loan to (Israel) Hapoel Kfar Saba) |

=== Maccabi Haifa ===
In:

| No. | Pos. | Nation | Player |
|---|---|---|---|
| — | GK | SRB | Vladimir Stojković (from (Greece) Ergotelis) |
| — | GK | ISR | Ohad Levita (on loan from (Israel) Maccabi Netanya) |
| — | GK | ISR | Ram Strauss (was on loan to (Israel) Hapoel Ramat Gan) |
| — | DF | ISR | Matan Ohayon (from (Israel) Hapoel Ironi Kiryat Shmona) |
| — | DF | ISR | Amir Nasar A Din (was on loan to (Israel) Bnei Sakhnin) |
| — | MF | ISR | Yossi Benayoun (from (England) Queens Park Rangers) |
| — | MF | ISR | Dor Kochav (was on loan to (Israel) Hapoel Afula) |
| — | MF | ISR | Sintayehu Sallalich (was on loan to (Israel) Beitar Jerusalem) |
| — | MF | ISR | Eran Rozenbaum (was on loan to (Israel) Hapoel Nazareth Illit) |
| — | MF | ISR | Kobi Moyal (from (Moldova) Sheriff Tiraspol) |
| — | MF | ESP | Míchel (from (Spain) Getafe) |
| — | FW | ISR | Shahar Hirsh (from (Israel) Hapoel Haifa) |
| — | FW | CMR | Mohammadou Idrissou (from (Germany) FC Kaiserslautern) |
| — | FW | ISR | Mohammed Kalibat (was on loan to (Israel) Bnei Sakhnin) |
| — | FW | ISR | Weaam Amasha (was on loan to (Israel) Hapoel Ironi Kiryat Shmona) |
| — | FW | ISR | Raz Stain (was on loan to (Israel) Hapoel Katamon Jerusalem) |
| — | FW | ISR | Roi Atar (was on loan to (Israel) Hapoel Acre) |

Out:

| No. | Pos. | Nation | Player |
|---|---|---|---|
| — | GK | SRB | Bojan Šaranov (Free Agent) |
| — | GK | ISR | Ron Shushan (on loan to (Israel) Hapoel Nazareth Illit) |
| — | GK | ISR | Ram Strauss (to (Cyprus) Nea Salamis Famagusta) |
| — | DF | UKR | Andriy Pylyavskyi (to (Ukraine) Zorya Luhansk) |
| — | DF | ISR | Sari Falah (on loan to (Israel) Hapoel Tel Aviv) |
| — | DF | ISR | Amir Nasar A Din (on loan to (Israel) Hapoel Nir Ramat HaSharon) |
| — | DF | ISR | Eden Ben Hemo (to (Israel) Beitar Nahariya) |
| — | DF | ISR | Yuval Yosipovich (on loan to (Israel) Hapoel Afula) |
| — | DF | ISR | Baha Halabi (on loan to (Israel) Hakoah Amidar Ramat Gan) |
| — | MF | ISR | Avihay Yadin (Free Agent) |
| — | MF | ISR | Yaniv Katan (Retired) |
| — | MF | ISR | Dor Kochav (on loan to (Israel) Hapoel Petah Tikva) |
| — | MF | ISR | Eyal Golasa (to (Greece) PAOK) |
| — | MF | ISR | Sintayehu Sallalich (to (Slovenia) Maribor) |
| — | MF | ISR | Micha Louta (on loan to (Israel) Hapoel Afula) |
| — | MF | ISR | Ismaeel Ryan (on loan to (Israel) Bnei Sakhnin) |
| — | MF | ISR | Eran Rozenbaum (on loan to (Israel) Hapoel Ra'anana) |
| — | MF | ISR | Adi Konstantinos (on loan to (Israel) Hapoel Acre) |
| — | MF | ISR | Omer Lovinger (to (Israel) Beitar Nahariya) |
| — | FW | HUN | Tamás Priskin (was on loan from FK Austria) |
| — | FW | ISR | Raz Stain (on loan to (Israel) Hapoel Acre) |
| — | FW | ISR | Dor Hugi (on loan to (Israel) Hapoel Petah Tikva) |
| — | FW | ISR | Shahar Hirsh (on loan to (Israel) Hapoel Petah Tikva) |
| — | FW | ISR | Roi Atar (on loan to (Israel) Hapoel Nir Ramat HaSharon) |
| — | FW | ISR | Shlomi Azulay (on loan to (Israel) Hapoel Tel Aviv) |

=== Bnei Sakhnin ===
In:

| No. | Pos. | Nation | Player |
|---|---|---|---|
| — | GK | ISR | Ran Kadoch (from (Israel) Beitar Kfar Saba) |
| — | DF | ISR | Itzik Cohen (Free transfer) |
| — | DF | MNE | Igor Jovanović (from (Montenegro) Rudar) |
| — | DF | ISR | Ihab Shami (was on loan to (Israel) Hapoel Shefa-'Amr) |
| — | MF | SVN | Miha Mevlja (from (Switzerland) FC Lausanne-Sport) |
| — | MF | PLE | Ibrahim Said Ahmed (from (Palestine) Markaz Shabab Al-Am'ari) |
| — | MF | ISR | Ismaeel Ryan (on loan from (Israel) Maccabi Haifa) |
| — | MF | GRE | Yiannis Papadopoulos (from (Poland) Cracovia) |
| — | FW | ISR | Ahmed Nahia (was on loan to (Israel) Hapoel Ashkelon) |
| — | FW | SRB | Milan Bojović (from (Greece) Panetolikos) |

Out:

| No. | Pos. | Nation | Player |
|---|---|---|---|
| — | DF | ISR | Amir Nasar A Din (was on loan from (Israel) Maccabi Haifa) |
| — | DF | ISR | Mor Shushan (to (Israel) Hapoel Bnei Lod) |
| — | DF | ISR | Dedi Ben Dayan (to (Israel) Maccabi Petah Tikva) |
| — | DF | ISR | Bassam Ganaim (on loan to (Israel) Maccabi Sektzia Ma'alot-Tarshiha) |
| — | MF | ISR | Ravid Gazal (Free Agent) |
| — | MF | ESP | Jorge Alonso (Free Agent) |
| — | MF | ISR | Nabil Gentous (on loan to (Israel) Maccabi Sektzia Ma'alot-Tarshiha) |
| — | MF | ISR | Cristian Hidalgo (to (India) Chennaiyin) |
| — | FW | ESP | Marc Fernández (Free Agent) |
| — | FW | ISR | Mohammed Kalibat (was on loan from (Israel) Maccabi Haifa) |

=== Beitar Jerusalem ===
In:

| No. | Pos. | Nation | Player |
|---|---|---|---|
| — | GK | ISR | Boris Klaiman (from (Israel) Hapoel Tel Aviv) |
| — | GK | ISR | Ben Rahav (from (Israel) Beitar Tel Aviv Ramla) |
| — | DF | ESP | César Arzo (from (Spain) Real Zaragoza) |
| — | DF | ISR | Ze'ev Haimovich (from (Israel) Hapoel Tel Aviv) |
| — | DF | ISR | Matan Barashi (was on loan to (Israel) Hapoel Katamon Jerusalem) |
| — | DF | ISR | Shmulik Malul (from (Israel) Maccabi Petah Tikva) |
| — | MF | ISR | Hanan Maman (from (Belgium) Waasland-Beveren) |
| — | MF | ISR | Lidor Cohen (from (Israel) Maccabi Petah Tikva) |
| — | MF | BRA | Claudemir (from (Portugal) Nacional) |
| — | MF | ISR | Mor Shaked (from (Israel) Hapoel Rishon LeZion) |
| — | MF | ISR | Shlomi Azulay (on loan from (Israel) Hapoel Rishon LeZion) |
| — | FW | MNE | Žarko Korać (from (Israel) Hapoel Haifa) |
| — | FW | ISR | Omer Nachmani (was on loan to (Israel) Maccabi Herzliya) |
| — | FW | ISR | Tomer Swisa (on loan from (Israel) Hapoel Be'er Sheva) |

Out:

| No. | Pos. | Nation | Player |
|---|---|---|---|
| — | GK | ISR | Ohad Saidof (to (Israel) Hapoel Katamon Jerusalem) |
| — | GK | ISR | Maor Ben Ya'akov (to (Israel) Hapoel Katamon Jerusalem) |
| — | GK | ISR | Ariel Harush (to (Israel) Maccabi Netanya) |
| — | DF | ISR | Nisso Kapiloto (to (Switzerland) St. Gallen) |
| — | DF | VEN | Andrés Túñez (was on loan from (Spain) Celta) |
| — | DF | ESP | Jonathan Vila (was on loan from (Spain) Celta) |
| — | DF | ISR | Matan Toledano (on loan to (Israel) Hapoel Ashkelon) |
| — | DF | ISR | Matan Barashi (on loan to (Israel) Hakoah Amidar Ramat Gan) |
| — | MF | ARG | Pablo Brandán (to (Romania) Universitatea Craoiva) |
| — | MF | ISR | Moshe Lugasi (was on loan from (Israel) Maccabi Tel Aviv) |
| — | MF | ISR | Sintayehu Sallalich (was on loan from (Israel) Maccabi Haifa) |
| — | MF | ISR | Aviram Baruchyan (Free Agent) |
| — | MF | ISR | Barak Moshe (to (Israel) Hapoel Jerusalem) |
| — | MF | ISR | Tzahi Elihen (to (Israel) Hakoah Amidar Ramat Gan) |
| — | MF | ISR | Roei Zikri (on loan to (Israel) Hakoah Amidar Ramat Gan) |
| — | FW | ISR | Shlomi Azulay (was on loan from (Israel) Maccabi Haifa) |
| — | FW | BRA | Bryan (to (Israel) Hapoel Ramat Gan) |

=== F.C. Ashdod ===
In:

| No. | Pos. | Nation | Player |
|---|---|---|---|
| — | DF | ISR | Rahamim Checkol (from (Israel) Hakoah Amidar Ramat Gan) |
| — | DF | ISR | Gal Barel (from (Israel) Hapoel Nir Ramat HaSharon) |
| — | DF | ISR | Idan Zion (was on loan to (Israel) Beitar Kfar Saba) |
| — | MF | ISR | Guy Abend (from (Israel) Hapoel Rishon LeZion) |
| — | MF | ISR | Ben Butbul (was on loan to (Israel) Hapoel Jerusalem) |
| — | FW | ISR | Murad Abu Anza (from (Israel) Hapoel Bnei Lod) |

Out:

| No. | Pos. | Nation | Player |
|---|---|---|---|
| — | GK | ISR | Yoav Jarafi (on loan to (Israel) Hapoel Ra'anana) |
| — | DF | ISR | Avihay Trabelsi (to (Israel) Maccabi Yavne) |
| — | DF | ISR | Amiran Shkalim (to (Israel) Hapoel Petah Tikva) |
| — | DF | ISR | Idan Zion (on loan to (Israel) Hapoel Ashkelon) |
| — | DF | ISR | Shai Maimon (to (Israel) Maccabi Ahi Nazareth) |
| — | DF | ISR | Orel Benita (on loan to (Israel) Sektzia Nes Tziona) |
| — | DF | ISR | Idan Mikdash (on loan to (Israel) Ironi Tiberias) |
| — | MF | ISR | Guy Tzarfati (Retired) |
| — | MF | ISR | Ben Butbul (on loan to (Israel) Hapoel Acre) |
| — | MF | ISR | Amir Lavi (on loan to (Israel) Hapoel Ashkelon) |
| — | MF | ISR | Moshe Sha'ashua (on loan to (Israel) Sektzia Nes Tziona) |
| — | FW | ISR | Gaëtan Varenne (to (Israel) Maccabi Yavne) |
| — | FW | ISR | Timor Avitan (on loan to (Israel) Maccabi Yavne) |

=== Hapoel Ra'anana ===
In:

| No. | Pos. | Nation | Player |
|---|---|---|---|
| — | GK | ISR | Daniel Lifshitz (from (Israel) Maccabi Herzliya) |
| — | GK | ISR | Yoav Jarafi (on loan from (Israel) Hapoel Ra'anana) |
| — | DF | ISR | Yakir Shina (from (Israel) Beitar Tel Aviv Ramla) |
| — | DF | ISR | Shahaf Helman (was on loan to (Israel) Hapoel Afula) |
| — | MF | BRA | Pedro Sass (from (Greece) Levadiakos) |
| — | MF | ISR | Eran Rozenbaum (from (Israel) Maccabi Haifa) |
| — | MF | ISR | Dela Yampolsky (from (Israel) Hapoel Haifa) |
| — | FW | ISR | Gil Blumstein (from (Israel) Hapoel Bnei Lod) |
| — | FW | ZAM | Evans Kangwa (on loan from (Zambia) Nkana) |

Out:

| No. | Pos. | Nation | Player |
|---|---|---|---|
| — | GK | ISR | Gal Nir (to (Israel) Maccabi Ahi Nazareth) |
| — | GK | ISR | Guy Solomon (Retired) |
| — | DF | ZAM | Francis Kasonde (to (India) Salgaocar) |
| — | DF | ISR | Shahaf Helman (to (Israel) Maccabi Herzliya) |
| — | MF | ISR | Reef Mesika (to (Israel) Hapoel Kfar Saba) |
| — | MF | ISR | Assi Baldout (to (Israel) Bnei Yehuda Tel Aviv) |
| — | MF | ISR | Tamir Cohen (Free Agent) |
| — | FW | ISR | Noam Ivgi (to (Israel) F.C. Giv'at Olga) |

=== Hapoel Acre ===
In:

| No. | Pos. | Nation | Player |
|---|---|---|---|
| — | DF | ISR | Ben Turjeman (on loan from (Israel) Hapoel Be'er Sheva) |
| — | DF | ISR | Uri Cohen (on loan from (Israel) Hapoel Tel Aviv) |
| — | MF | ISR | Yossi Dora (from (Israel) Hapoel Haifa) |
| — | MF | ISR | Adi Konstantinos (on loan from (Israel) Maccabi Haifa) |
| — | MF | ISR | Ben Butbul (on loan from (Israel) F.C. Ashdod) |
| — | FW | BIH | Emir Hadžić (from (Israel) Hapoel Nir Ramat HaSharon) |
| — | FW | ISR | Yuval Avidor (from (Israel) Hapoel Haifa) |
| — | FW | ISR | Raz Stain (on loan from (Israel) Hapoel Acre) |
| — | FW | ISR | Amir Abu Nil (on loan from Hapoel Haifa) |

Out:

| No. | Pos. | Nation | Player |
|---|---|---|---|
| — | DF | ISR | Sagiv Cohen (to (Israel) Hapoel Petah Tikva) |
| — | DF | ISR | Yuval Shabtay (to (Israel) Hapoel Haifa) |
| — | DF | ISR | Mahran Abu Raiya (to (Israel) Hapoel Haifa) |
| — | DF | ISR | Alon Ziv (to (Israel) Maccabi Ironi Acre) |
| — | MF | ISR | Steven Cohen (to (Israel) Hapoel Haifa) |
| — | DF | ISR | Klemi Saban (Free Agent) |
| — | MF | ISR | Guy Dayan (to (Israel) Hapoel Petah Tikva) |
| — | MF | CRO | Mirko Oremuš (to (Israel) Hapoel Petah Tikva) |
| — | MF | ISR | Hen Argalzi (to (Israel) Maccabi Sektzia Ma'alot-Tarshiha) |
| — | FW | SRB | Nenad Marinković (to (Serbia) Partizan) |
| — | FW | ISR | Yossi Asayag (to (Israel) Maccabi Yavne) |
| — | FW | ISR | Roi Atar (was on loan from (Israel) Maccabi Haifa) |
| — | FW | ISR | Dudu Afflalo (on loan to (Israel) Maccabi Sektzia Ma'alot-Tarshiha) |

=== Hapoel Haifa ===
In:

| No. | Pos. | Nation | Player |
|---|---|---|---|
| — | GK | CZE | Přemysl Kovář (from (Czech Republic) Slovan Liberec) |
| — | DF | ISR | Gal Cohen (from (Israel) Bnei Yehuda Tel Aviv) |
| — | DF | ISR | Yuval Shabtay (from (Israel) Hapoel Acre) |
| — | DF | ISR | Mahran Abu Raiya (ofrm (Israel) Hapoel Acre) |
| — | DF | ISR | Omer Vered (from (Israel) Bnei Yehuda Tel Aviv) |
| — | MF | LTU | Mindaugas Kalonas (from (Azerbaijan) Baku) |
| — | MF | ISR | Steven Cohen (from (Israel) Hapoel Acre) |
| — | MF | ISR | Almog Ohayon (from (Israel) Maccabi Ironi Kiryat Ata) |
| — | FW | ISR | Shahar Hirsh (was on loan to (Israel) Hapoel Afula) |
| — | FW | ISR | Amir Abu Nil (was on loan to (Israel) Maccabi Ahi Nazareth) |
| — | FW | CAN | Tosaint Ricketts (from (Turkey) Bucaspor) |
| — | FW | GHA | Osei Mawuli (from (Israel) Hapoel Ashkelon) |

Out:

| No. | Pos. | Nation | Player |
|---|---|---|---|
| — | GK | ISR | Tvrtko Kale (to (Israel) Hapoel Petah Tikva) |
| — | DF | ISR | Omri Kende (to (Israel) Maccabi Netanya) |
| — | DF | SRB | Danilo Nikolić (Free Agent) |
| — | DF | ISR | Amir Nussbaum (to (Israel) Hapoel Kfar Saba) |
| — | DF | ISR | Sharon Levy (to (Israel) Ironi Nesher) |
| — | DF | ISR | Or Lagrisi (on loan to (Israel) Hapoel Beit She'an) |
| — | MF | ISR | Yossi Dora (to (Israel) Hapoel Acre) |
| — | MF | ISR | Liran Cohen (Free Agent) |
| — | MF | ISR | Adir Dahan (Free Agent) |
| — | MF | ISR | David Revivo (to (Israel) Maccabi Yavne) |
| — | MF | ISR | Niv Fogel (on loan to (Israel) Ironi Tiberias) |
| — | MF | ISR | Dela Yampolsky (to (Israel) Hapoel Ra'anana) |
| — | MF | ISR | Ahad Azam (to (Israel) Hapoel Ironi Kiryat Shmona) |
| — | FW | ISR | Yuval Avidor (to (Israel) Hapoel Acre) |
| — | FW | ISR | Shahar Hirsh (to (Israel) Maccabi Haifa) |
| — | FW | MNE | Žarko Korać (to (Israel) Beitar Jerusalem) |
| — | FW | NGA | Ziku (on loan to (Israel) Hapoel Afula) |

=== Maccabi Petah Tikva ===
In:

| No. | Pos. | Nation | Player |
|---|---|---|---|
| — | GK | ISR | Itamar Nitzan (from (Israel) Hapoel Nir Ramat HaSharon) |
| — | DF | ISR | Dedi Ben Dayan (from (Israel) Bnei Sakhnin) |
| — | DF | BUL | Daniel Dimov (from (Bulgaria) Levski Sofia) |
| — | MF | ISR | Hasan Abu Zaid (on loan from (Israel) Maccabi Tel Aviv) |
| — | MF | ISR | Nicolás Falczuk (from (Israel) Hapoel Be'er Sheva) |
| — | MF | USA | Bryan Gerzicich (from (Israel) Hapoel Tel Aviv) |
| — | MF | ISR | Moshe Lugasi (on loan from (Israel) Maccabi Tel Aviv) |
| — | MF | COD | Joachim Mununga (from (Belgium) Mons) |
| — | FW | ISR | Ben Ben Yair (on loan from (Israel) Maccabi Tel Aviv) |
| — | FW | ISR | Idan Shemesh (from (Israel) Hapoel Katamon Jerusalem) |
| — | FW | ISR | Guy Melamed (was on loan from (Israel) Maccabi Herzliya) |
| — | FW | BUL | Kostadin Hazurov (from (Belgium) Lierse) |

Out:

| No. | Pos. | Nation | Player |
|---|---|---|---|
| — | GK | ISR | Nil Abarbanel (to (Israel) Maccabi Kiryat Gat) |
| — | GK | ISR | Yogev Bin-Nun (on loan to (Israel) Ironi Modi'in) |
| — | DF | ISR | Nitzan Damari (to (Israel) Maccabi Herzliya) |
| — | DF | ISR | Shmulik Malul (to (Israel) Beitar Jerusalem) |
| — | MF | ISR | Lidor Cohen (to (Israel) Beitar Jerusalem) |
| — | MF | ISR | Dia Saba (to (Israel) Maccabi Netanya) |
| — | MF | ARG | Pedro Joaquín Galván (to (Israel) Bnei Yehuda Tel Aviv) |
| — | MF | FIN | Erfan Zeneli (to (Finland) HJK Helsinki) |
| — | MF | ISR | Hasan Abu Zaid (to (Israel) Hapoel Petah Tikva) |
| — | FW | ISR | Victor Merey (to (Israel) Ironi Tiberias) |

=== Maccabi Netanya ===
In:

| No. | Pos. | Nation | Player |
|---|---|---|---|
| — | GK | ISR | Ariel Harush (from (Israel) Beitar Jerusalem) |
| — | DF | ISR | Shimon Harush (from (Israel) Hapoel Tel Aviv) |
| — | DF | ISR | Omri Kende (from (Israel) Hapoel Haifa) |
| — | DF | ISR | Cristian Sârghi (from (Romania) Oţelul Galaţi) |
| — | DF | ISR | David Tiram (was on loan to (Israel) F.C. Kafr Qasim) |
| — | DF | ISR | Eyad Abu Abaid (from (Israel) Beitar Nes Tubruk) |
| — | MF | ISR | Anas Dabour (from (Israel) Maccabi Ahi Nazareth) |
| — | MF | ISR | Dia Saba (from (Israel) Maccabi Petah Tikva) |
| — | MF | ROU | Gabriel Giurgiu (from (Romania) Oţelul Galaţi) |
| — | MF | ISR | Raul Gorshumov (from (Israel) Beitar Nes Tubruk) |
| — | FW | ISR | Amit Ben Shushan (from (Cyprus) Anorthosis Famagusta) |
| — | FW | ISR | Orr Barouch (from (United States) Chicago Fire) |
| — | FW | ISR | Dor Malka (from (Israel) Beitar Nes Tubruk) |

Out:

| No. | Pos. | Nation | Player |
|---|---|---|---|
| — | GK | ISR | Robi Levkovich (to (Israel) Hapoel Be'er Sheva) |
| — | GK | ISR | Matan Zalmanovich (to (Israel) Hakoah Amidar Ramat Gan) |
| — | GK | ISR | Ohad Levita (on loan to (Israel) Maccabi Haifa) |
| — | DF | COD | Savity Lipenia (to (Israel) Maccabi Ahi Nazareth) |
| — | DF | SUR | Touvarno Pinas (to (Israel) Hapoel Ironi Kiryat Shmona) |
| — | DF | ISR | Adir Tubul (to (Israel) Hapoel Ashkelon) |
| — | DF | ISR | David Tiram (on loan to (Israel) Maccabi Kiryat Gat) |
| — | DF | ISR | Eden Ben Menashe (on loan to (Israel) Hapoel Hod HaSharon) |
| — | MF | ISR | Kobi Hassan (to (Israel) Hapoel Marmorek) |
| — | MF | ISR | Adi Soffer (to (Israel) Hapoel Jerusalem) |
| — | MF | ISR | Shalev Menashe (Free Agent) |
| — | MF | ISR | Gal Malka (to (Israel) Hapoel Tel Aviv) |
| — | MF | ISR | Lior Jan (to (Israel) Maccabi Yavne) |
| — | MF | ISR | Gal Kulni (to (Israel) Maccabi Herzliya) |
| — | MF | ISR | Ben Malka (Free Agent) |
| — | MF | ISR | Liran Shriki (on loan to (Israel) Hapoel Nir Ramat HaSharon) |
| — | FW | ISR | Eli Harush (on loan to (Israel) Maccabi Yavne) |
| — | FW | ISR | Ido Exbard (was on loan from (Israel) Hapoel Be'er Sheva) |

=== Hapoel Petah Tikva ===
In:

| No. | Pos. | Nation | Player |
|---|---|---|---|
| — | GK | ISR | Tvrtko Kale (from (Israel) Hapoel Haifa) |
| — | DF | ISR | Sagiv Cohen (from (Israel) Hapoel Acre) |
| — | DF | ISR | Amiran Shkalim (from (Israel) F.C. Ashdod) |
| — | DF | ISR | Reef Peretz (on loan from (Israel) Maccabi Tel Aviv) |
| — | DF | ISR | Kobi Musa (from (Israel) Hapoel Nir Ramat HaSharon) |
| — | DF | SRB | Vujadin Savić (from (France) Bordeaux) |
| — | DF | GUI | Sekou Conde (from (Israel) Hakoah Amidar Ramat Gan) |
| — | MF | ISR | Ohad Edelstein (was on loan to (Israel) Maccabi Kiryat Gat) |
| — | MF | NGA | Michael Tukura (from (Israel) Hakoah Amidar Ramat Gan) |
| — | MF | CRO | Mirko Oremuš (from (Israel) Hapoel Acre) |
| — | MF | ISR | Yaniv Luzon (from (Israel) Hapoel Ramat Gan) |
| — | MF | ISR | Omri Altman (on loan from (Israel) Maccabi Tel Aviv) |
| — | MF | NGA | Chimazie Mbah (from (Israel) Hapoel Bnei Lod) |
| — | MF | ISR | Hasan Abu Zaid (on loan from (Israel) Maccabi Tel Aviv) |
| — | FW | ISR | Dor Hugi (on loan from (Israel) Maccabi Haifa) |
| — | FW | ISR | Shahar Hirsh (on loan from (Israel) Maccabi Haifa) |

Out:

| No. | Pos. | Nation | Player |
|---|---|---|---|
| — | GK | ISR | Avi Ivgi (to (Israel) Maccabi Herzliya) |
| — | DF | ISR | Ben Zhairi (was on loan from (Israel) Bnei Yehuda Tel Aviv) |
| — | DF | ISR | Din Refaeli (to (Israel) Hapoel Mahane Yehuda) |
| — | DF | GHA | Imoro Lukman (to (Israel) Hapoel Bnei Lod) |
| — | DF | ISR | Yogev Ben Simon (to (Israel) Hapoel Rishon LeZion) |
| — | MF | ISR | Bar Mizrahi (to (Israel) Hakoah Amidar Ramat Gan) |
| — | MF | ISR | Tal Meir (to (Israel) Hapoel Rishon LeZion) |
| — | MF | ISR | Rubi Dvora (on loan to (Israel) Hapoel Nir Ramat HaShron) |
| — | MF | ISR | Ohad Edelstein (on loan to (Israel) Hapoel Ashkelon) |
| — | MF | ISR | Shay Revivo (to (Israel) Hapoel Ashkelon) |
| — | MF | ISR | Itay Elkaslasy (to (Israel) Hapoel Rishon LeZion) |
| — | FW | BRA | David Gomez (to (Israel) Maccabi Ahi Nazareth) |
| — | FW | ISR | Shahar Balilti (on loan to (Israel) Hapoel Katamon Jerusalem) |
| — | FW | ISR | Or Fishbein (to (Israel) Hapoel Ashkelon) |
| — | FW | ARG | Adrián Fernández (to (Israel) Maccabi Herzliya) |

== Liga Leumit ==
=== Hapoel Nir Ramat HaSharon ===
In:

| No. | Pos. | Nation | Player |
|---|---|---|---|
| — | GK | ISR | Tomer Chencinski (from (Israel) Maccabi Tel Aviv) |
| — | DF | ISR | Ran Kojok (from (Israel) Maccabi Kiryat Gat) |
| — | DF | ISR | Amir Nasar A Din (on loan from (Israel) Maccabi Haifa) |
| — | DF | ISR | Qasem Najar (was on loan to (Israel) Hapoel Daliyat al-Karmel) |
| — | DF | ISR | Ido Saundres (from (Israel) Hapoel Afula) |
| — | DF | ISR | Ben Grabli (on loan from (Israel) Hapoel Be'er Sheva) |
| — | MF | ISR | Oriyan Ya'akov (was on loan to (Israel) Hapoel Kfar Saba) |
| — | MF | ISR | Rubi Dvora (on loan from (Israel) Hapoel Petah Tikva) |
| — | MF | ISR | Maor Kanadil (on loan from (Israel) Bnei Yehuda Tel Aviv) |
| — | MF | ISR | Omer Peretz (on loan from (Israel) Hapoel Tel Aviv) |
| — | FW | ISR | Roi Atar (on loan from (Israel) Maccabi Haifa) |
| — | FW | ISR | Ben Azubel (from (Israel) Hakoah Amidar Ramat Gan) |
| — | FW | ISR | Omer Boaron (from (Israel) Hapoel Herzliya) |
| — | FW | ISR | Eden Gendler (from (Israel) Maccabi Ironi Bat Yam) |

Out:

| No. | Pos. | Nation | Player |
|---|---|---|---|
| — | GK | ISR | Itamar Nitzan (to (Israel) Maccabi Petah Tikva) |
| — | DF | ISR | Reef Peretz (was on loan from (Israel) Maccabi Tel Aviv) |
| — | DF | ISR | Yagil Biton (was on loan from (Israel) Maccabi Tel Aviv) |
| — | DF | ISR | Gal Barel (to (Israel) F.C. Ashdod) |
| — | MF | ISR | Ben Reichert (to (Israel) Maccabi Tel Aviv) |
| — | MF | ISR | Mohammed Azberga (to (Israel) Maccabi Ahi Nazareth) |
| — | FW | ISR | Ben Ben Yair (was on loan from (Israel) Maccabi Tel Aviv) |
| — | FW | ISR | Yosef Abu Laben (was on loan from (Israel) Hapoel Be'er Sheva) |
| — | FW | BIH | Emir Hadžić (to (Israel) Hapoel Acre) |
| — | FW | SRB | Aleksandar Đoković (to (United States) LA Galaxy II) |
| — | FW | ISR | Efraim Taka (to (Israel) Maccabi Herzliya) |

=== Bnei Yehuda Tel Aviv ===
In:

| No. | Pos. | Nation | Player |
|---|---|---|---|
| — | GK | ISR | Dor Davidi (from (Israel) Hapoel Kfar Shalem) |
| — | DF | ISR | Nadav Muniss (was on loan to (Israel) Maccabi Yavne) |
| — | DF | ISR | Ben Zhairi (was on loan to (Israel) Hapoel Petah Tikva) |
| — | DF | ISR | Tal Bublil (from (United States) Drexel University) |
| — | MF | ISR | Maor Kanadil (was on loan to (Israel) Maccabi Jaffa) |
| — | MF | ISR | Assi Baldout (from (Israel) Hapoel Ra'anana) |
| — | MF | ARG | Pedro Joaquín Galván (from (Israel) Maccabi Petah Tikva) |
| — | MF | ISR | Dolev Haziza (from (Israel) Sektzia Nes Tziona) |
| — | FW | ISR | Gal Zruya (from (Israel) F.C. Dimona) |

Out:

| No. | Pos. | Nation | Player |
|---|---|---|---|
| — | GK | ISR | Tom Almadon (to (Israel) Hapoel Tel Aviv) |
| — | DF | ISR | Gal Cohen (to (Israel) Hapoel Haifa) |
| — | DF | ISR | Ben Vehava (was on loan from (Israel) Beitar Nes Tubruk) |
| — | DF | ARG | Emiliano Fusco (Free Agent) |
| — | MF | ISR | Maor Kanadil (on loan to (Israel) Hapoel Nir Ramat HaSharon) |
| — | MF | ISR | Hen Mizrahi (on loan to (Israel) Hapoel Kfar Shalem) |
| — | MF | GIB | Liam Walker (to (Gibraltar) Lincoln) |
| — | FW | ENG | James Keene (to (India) NorthEast United) |
| — | FW | ISR | Hen Azriel (Free Agent) |
| — | FW | ISR | Shlomi Levi (on loan to (Israel) Hapoel Rishon LeZion) |

=== Hapoel Bnei Lod ===
In:

| No. | Pos. | Nation | Player |
|---|---|---|---|
| — | DF | ISR | Mor Shushan (from (Israel) Bnei Sakhnin) |
| — | DF | GHA | Imoro Lukman (from (Israel) Hapoel Petah Tikva) |
| — | DF | ISR | Dor Azulay (on loan from (Israel) Hapoel Petah Tikva) |
| — | DF | ISR | Luhad Kayal (from (Israel) Hapoel Nazareth Illit) |
| — | DF | ISR | Ahmed Sha'aban (from (Israel) Hapoel Nazareth Illit) |
| — | MF | ISR | Salim Tuama (from (Israel) Hapoel Tel Aviv) |
| — | MF | ISR | Yossi Biton (on loan from (Israel) Hapoel Jerusalem) |
| — | FW | ISR | Ahmad Saba'a (Free transfer) |

Out:

| No. | Pos. | Nation | Player |
|---|---|---|---|
| — | DF | BRA | Heverton Zago (to (Israel) Hakoah Amidar Ramat Gan) |
| — | DF | ISR | Lior Reuven (to (Israel) Hapoel Ashkelon) |
| — | DF | ISR | Amar Mansour (to (Israel) F.C. Kafr Qasim) |
| — | MF | ISR | Firas Awad (was on loan from (Israel) Hapoel Be'er Sheva) |
| — | MF | GEO | Giorgi Gabidauri (Free Agent) |
| — | MF | ISR | Ya'akov Ben Hemo (to (Israel) Hapoel Ashkelon) |
| — | MF | NGA | Chimezie Mbah (to (Israel) Hapoel Petah Tikva) |
| — | FW | ISR | Gil Blumstein (to (Israel) Hapoel Ra'anana) |
| — | FW | CIV | Serge Ayeli (to (Israel) Maccabi Yavne) |
| — | FW | ISR | Murad Abu Anza (to (Israel) F.C. Ashdod) |
| — | FW | ISR | Meir Elkabetz (to (Israel) Maccabi Kiryat Gat) |

=== Maccabi Ahi Nazareth ===
In:

| No. | Pos. | Nation | Player |
|---|---|---|---|
| — | GK | ISR | Gal Nir (from (Israel) Hapoel Ra'anana) |
| — | DF | ISR | Shai Maimon (from (Israel) F.C. Ashdod) |
| — | DF | COD | Savity Lipenia (from (Israel) Maccabi Netanya) |
| — | DF | ISR | Adi Sheleg (from (Israel) Hapoel Rishon LeZion) |
| — | MF | ISR | Mohammed Azberga (from (Israel) Hapoel Nir Ramat HaSharon) |
| — | FW | BRA | David Gomez (from (Israel) Hapoel Petah Tikva) |
| — | FW | ISR | Ido Exbard (from (Israel) Hapoel Be'er Sheva) |

Out:

| No. | Pos. | Nation | Player |
|---|---|---|---|
| — | GK | ISR | Gad Amos (to (Israel) Ironi Nesher) |
| — | DF | NGA | Taye Babalola (to (Israel) Ironi Tiberias) |
| — | MF | ISR | Anas Dabour (to (Israel) Maccabi Netanya) |
| — | MF | ISR | Ali Habiballah (on loan to (Israel) Maccabi Ein Mahil Jamel) |
| — | MF | ISR | Mazen Amdentallah (on loan to (Israel) Hapoel Kafr Kanna) |
| — | FW | SVN | David Poljanec (to (Serbia) Radnički 1923) |
| — | FW | ISR | Allah Baker (on loan to (Israel) F.C. Alnadha Nazareth) |

=== Hapoel Ramat Gan ===
In:

| No. | Pos. | Nation | Player |
|---|---|---|---|
| — | GK | ISR | Idan Baruch (from (Romania) Unirea Slobozia) |
| — | DF | ISR | Oz Ifrah (from (Israel) Hapoel Ashkelon) |
| — | MF | ISR | Eliraz Yehuda (from (Israel) F.C. Shikun HaMizrah) |
| — | FW | BRA | Bryan (from (Israel) Beitar Jerusalem) |

Out:

| No. | Pos. | Nation | Player |
|---|---|---|---|
| — | GK | ISR | Ram Strauss (was on loan from (Israel) Maccabi Haifa) |
| — | DF | ISR | Tal Ma'abi (to (Israel) Maccabi Jaffa) |
| — | DF | ISR | Uri Bibi (to (Israel) Hapoel Rishon LeZion) |
| — | MF | ISR | Yaniv Luzon (to (Israel) Hapoel Petah Tikva) |
| — | MF | ISR | Yossi Abitbul (to (Israel) F.C. Giv'at Olga) |
| — | MF | ISR | Itzik Vaknin (to (Israel) Maccabi Kiryat Gat) |
| — | FW | ISR | Ran Ben Shimon (to (Israel) Maccabi Kiryat Gat) |
| — | FW | ISR | Nisan Danon (to (Israel) Maccabi Herzliya) |

=== Hapoel Afula ===
In:

| No. | Pos. | Nation | Player |
|---|---|---|---|
| — | GK | ISR | Ohad David (from (Israel) Hapoel Beit She'an) |
| — | DF | ISR | Yuval Yosipovich (on loan from (Israel) Maccabi Haifa) |
| — | DF | ISR | Dor Malichi (from (Israel) Hapoel Nir Ramat HaSharon) |
| — | DF | ISR | Eliyahu Balilti (on loan from (Israel) Hapoel Ironi Kiryat Shmona) |
| — | MF | ISR | Amir Abeles (from (Israel) Hapoel Beit She'an) |
| — | MF | ISR | Micha Louta (on loan from (Israel) Maccabi Haifa) |
| — | MF | ISR | Or Eliyahu (from (Israel) Beitar Tel Aviv Ramla) |
| — | FW | NGA | Ziku (on loan from (Israel) Hapoel Haifa) |
| — | FW | NGA | Lanry Kahinda (on loan from (Israel) Maccabi Tel Aviv) |
| — | FW | ISR | Izhak Nash (from (Israel) Hakoah Amidar Ramat Gan) |

Out:

| No. | Pos. | Nation | Player |
|---|---|---|---|
| — | DF | ISR | Shahaf Helman (was on loan from (Israel) Hapoel Ra'anana) |
| — | DF | MDA | Igor Andronic (to (Moldova) Dinamo Tiraspol) |
| — | DF | ISR | Ido Saundres (to (Israel) Hapoel Nir Ramat HaSharon) |
| — | MF | ISR | Dor Kochav (was on loan from (Israel) Maccabi Haifa) |
| — | MF | ISR | Shinhar Murad (on loan to (Israel) Hapoel Migdal HaEmek) |
| — | MF | ISR | Ehud Ma'arvi (was on loan from (Israel) Hapoel Ironi Kiryat Shmona) |
| — | FW | ISR | Shahar Hirsh (was on loan from (Israel) Hapoel Haifa) |
| — | FW | MDA | Constantin Mandricenco (Free Agent) |
| — | FW | ISR | Elnatan Salami (to (Israel) F.C. Shikun HaMizrah) |
| — | FW | ISR | Hasiv Abu Rukon (to (Israel) Ihud Bnei Majd al-Krum) |

=== Beitar Tel Aviv Ramla ===
In:

| No. | Pos. | Nation | Player |
|---|---|---|---|
| — | DF | ISR | Maoz Samia (from (Israel) Hapoel Jerusalem) |
| — | DF | ISR | Nir Lax (on loan from (Israel) Hapoel Tel Aviv) |
| — | DF | ISR | Uri Magabo (from (Israel) Hapoel Ashkelon) |
| — | MF | ISR | Didi Unger (from (Israel) Sektzia Nes Tziona) |

Out:

| No. | Pos. | Nation | Player |
|---|---|---|---|
| — | GK | ISR | Ben Rahav (to (Israel) Beitar Jerusalem) |
| — | DF | ISR | Yakir Shina (to (Israel) Hapoel Ra'anana) |
| — | DF | ISR | Yaniv Ifergan (to (Israel) Maccabi Kiryat Gat) |
| — | MF | ISR | Phillip Manneh (was on loan from (Israel) Hapoel Tel Aviv) |
| — | MF | ISR | Jack Yosef (to (Israel) Hakoah Amidar Ramat Gan) |
| — | MF | ISR | Roy Shir (to (Israel) Maccabi Kabilio Jaffa) |
| — | MF | ISR | Or Eliyahu (to (Israel) Hapoel Afula) |
| — | MF | ISR | Shmuel Wassi (to (Israel) Hapoel Hadera) |

=== Hapoel Nazareth Illit ===
In:

| No. | Pos. | Nation | Player |
|---|---|---|---|
| — | GK | ISR | Ron Shushan (on loan from (Israel) Maccabi Haifa) |
| — | DF | ISR | Niv Serdal (on loan from (Israel) Hapoel Haifa) |
| — | DF | ISR | Niran Rotstein (from (Israel) Hapoel Migdal HaEmek) |
| — | MF | GHA | William Owusu (On loan from (Israel) F.C. Ashdod) |
| — | MF | ISR | Naor Abudi (on loan from (Israel) Hapoel Ironi Kiryat Shmona) |
| — | MF | ISR | Liad Elmaliah (was on loan to (Israel) Hapoel Ashkelon) |
| — | FW | MDA | Eugen Sidorenco (on loan from (Russia) Tom Tomsk) |

Out:

| No. | Pos. | Nation | Player |
|---|---|---|---|
| — | GK | ISR | Shuki Birani (on loan to (Israel) Maccabi Daliyat al-Karmel) |
| — | GK | ISR | Gil Ofek (to (Israel) Maccabi Ironi Kiryat Ata) |
| — | DF | ISR | Meidan Steinberg (on loan to (Israel) Hapoel F.C. Karmiel Safed) |
| — | DF | ISR | Anan Tuama (to (Israel) F.C. Julis) |
| — | DF | ISR | Luhab Kayal (to (Israel) Hapoel Bneil Lod) |
| — | MF | ISR | Rotem Shmul (to (Israel) Ironi Tiberias) |
| — | MF | ISR | Shalev Braver (om loan to (Israel) Ironi Tiberias) |
| — | MF | ISR | Eran Rozenbaum (to (Israel) Hapoel Ra'anana) |
| — | MF | ISR | Ram Sofer (on loan to (Israel) Hapoel Asi Gilboa) |
| — | MF | ISR | Shadi Saleh (on loan to (Israel) Hapoel Iksal) |
| — | MF | ISR | Mohammad Ghadir (Free agent) |
| — | FW | ISR | Sagi Hayat (on loan to (Israel) F.C. Haifa) |
| — | FW | ISR | Yotam Cohen (on loan to (Israel) Hapoel Migdal HaEmek) |

=== Maccabi Yavne ===
In:

| No. | Pos. | Nation | Player |
|---|---|---|---|
| — | DF | ISR | Avihay Trabelsi (from (Israel) F.C. Ashdod) |
| — | DF | ISR | Ohav Peri (from (Israel) Maccabi Herzliya) |
| — | DF | ISR | Daniel Raz (from (Israel) Maccabi Herzliya) |
| — | DF | ISR | Uri Avraham (from (Israel) Hapoel Jerusalem) |
| — | DF | BRA | Nivaldo (from (Portugal) Rio Ave) |
| — | MF | ISR | Lior Jan (from (Israel) Maccabi Netanya) |
| — | MF | ISR | David Revivo (from (Israel) Hapoel Haifa) |
| — | MF | ISR | Daniel Gretz (on loan from (Israel) Maccabi Tel Aviv) |
| — | FW | CIV | Serge Ayeli (from (Israel) Hapoel Bnei Lod) |
| — | FW | ISR | Yossi Asayag (from (Israel) Hapoel Acre) |
| — | FW | ISR | Eli Harush (from (Israel) Maccabi Netanya) |
| — | FW | ISR | Tomer Ohana (from (Israel) Hapoel Be'er Sheva) |
| — | FW | ISR | Gaëtan Varenne (from (Israel) F.C. Ashdod) |
| — | FW | ISR | Timor Avitan (on loan from (Israel) F.C. Ashdod) |

Out:

| No. | Pos. | Nation | Player |
|---|---|---|---|
| — | DF | ISR | Nadav Muniss (was on loan from (Israel) Bnei Yehuda Tel Aviv) |
| — | DF | ISR | Golan Hermon (to (Israel) Hapoel Katamon Jerusalem) |
| — | DF | ISR | Tomer Yerucham (was on loan from (Israel) Beitar Jerusalem) |
| — | MF | ISR | Orel Edri (to (Israel) Maccabi Herzliya) |
| — | FW | ISR | Bar Halifa (on loan to (Israel) Beitar Yavne) |
| — | FW | BUL | Miroslav Antonov (to (Bulgaria) Montana) |

=== Maccabi Herzliya ===
In:

| No. | Pos. | Nation | Player |
|---|---|---|---|
| — | GK | ISR | Avi Ivgi (from (Israel) Hapoel Petah Tikva) |
| — | GK | ISR | Bar Manker (was on loan to (Israel) Hapoel Hod HaSharon) |
| — | DF | ISR | Yagil Biton (from (Israel) Maccabi Tel Aviv) |
| — | DF | ISR | Shahaf Helman (from (Israel) Hapoel Ra'anana) |
| — | DF | ISR | Nitzan Damari (from (Israel) Maccabi Petah Tikva) |
| — | MF | ISR | Dor Halevi (from (Israel) Hapoel Katamon Jerusalem) |
| — | MF | ISR | Gal Kulni (from (Israel) Maccabi Netanya) |
| — | FW | ISR | Nisan Danon (from (Israel) Hapoel Ramat Gan) |
| — | FW | ISR | Itay Manzor (on loan from (Israel) Maccabi Netanya) |
| — | FW | ARG | Adrián Fernández (from (Israel) Hapoel Petah Tikva) |
| — | FW | ISR | Efraim Taka (from (Israel) Hapoel Nir Ramat HaSharon) |

Out:

| No. | Pos. | Nation | Player |
|---|---|---|---|
| — | GK | ISR | Itay Arkin (Free Agent) |
| — | GK | ISR | Dan Poznanski (to (Israel) Hapoel Hod HaSharon) |
| — | GK | ISR | Daniel Lifshitz (to (Israel) Hapoel Ra'anana) |
| — | DF | ISR | Ohav Peri (to (Israel) Maccabi Ironi Amishav Petah Tikva) |
| — | DF | ISR | Daniel Raz (Free Agent) |
| — | DF | ISR | Or Lagrisi (was on loan from (Israel) Hapoel Haifa) |
| — | DF | ISR | Ran Malka (to (Israel) Maccabi Kiryat Gat) |
| — | DF | ISR | Avi Malka (to (Israel) Maccabi Kiryat Gat) |
| — | DF | ISR | Regev Volk (to (Israel) Hapoel Marmorek) |
| — | DF | ISR | Yagil Biton (to (Israel) Hapoel Jerusalem) |
| — | MF | ISR | Shay David (Free Agent) |
| — | MF | BRA | Eudis (Free Agent) |
| — | MF | ISR | Tom Mond (Free Agent) |
| — | MF | ISR | Oren Asif (Free Agent) |
| — | MF | ISR | Imri Kovalevski (Free Agent) |
| — | FW | ISR | Asaf Krispis (to (Israel) Hapoel Marmorek) |
| — | FW | ISR | Omer Nachmani (was on loan from (Israel) Beitar Jerusalem) |
| — | FW | ISR | Rafi Amos (to (Israel) Maccabi Kiryat Gat) |
| — | FW | ISR | Yadin Zaris (was on loan to (Belgium) Standard Liège) |
| — | FW | ISR | Guy Melamed (was on loan from (Israel) Maccabi Petah Tikva) |

=== Hapoel Rishon LeZion ===
In:

| No. | Pos. | Nation | Player |
|---|---|---|---|
| — | GK | ISR | Matan Amber (from (Israel) Maccabi Tel Aviv) |
| — | DF | ISR | Uri Bibi (from (Israel) Hapoel Ramat Gan) |
| — | DF | ISR | Eran Sasportas (from (Israel) Hapoel Herzliya) |
| — | DF | ISR | Guy Gomberg (from (Israel) Sektzia Nes Tziona) |
| — | DF | ISR | Yogev Ben Simon (from (Israel) Hapoel Petah Tikva) |
| — | MF | ISR | Dor Itah (was on loan to (Israel) Maccabi Be'er Ya'akov) |
| — | MF | ISR | Offir Hemo (from (Israel) Hapoel Ashkelon) |
| — | MF | ISR | Tal Meir (from (Israel) Hapoel Petah Tikva) |
| — | MF | ISR | Itay Elkaslasy (from (Israel) Hapoel Petah Tikva) |
| — | MF | ARG | Facundo Schmidt (from (Argentina) San Jorge) |
| — | FW | ISR | Shlomi Levi (on loan from (Israel) Bnei Yehuda Tel Aviv) |

Out:

| No. | Pos. | Nation | Player |
|---|---|---|---|
| — | DF | ISR | Hen Asael (to (Israel) F.C. Shikun HaMizrah) |
| — | DF | ISR | Itay Tuef (to (Israel) Hapoel Kfar Saba) |
| — | DF | ISR | Gal Mayo (on loan to (Israel) Hapoel Ironi Kiryat Shmona) |
| — | MF | ISR | Guy Abend (Free Agent) |
| — | MF | ISR | Shlomi Azulay (on loan to (Israel) Beitar Jerusalem) |
| — | MF | ISR | Maor Asor (to (Israel) Maccabi Kabilio Jaffa) |
| — | MF | ISR | Dor Amsalem (on loan to (Israel) Sektzia Nes Tziona) |
| — | FW | ISR | Eden Shrem (was on loan from (Israel) Hapoel Tel Aviv) |
| — | FW | ISR | Daniel Blumenfeld (to (Israel) F.C. Shikun HaMizrah) |

=== Hapoel Jerusalem ===
In:

| No. | Pos. | Nation | Player |
|---|---|---|---|
| — | DF | ISR | Or Elkabetz (on loan from (Israel) Hapoel Marmorek) |
| — | DF | BRA | Daniel Borchal (from (Israel) Beitar Kfar Saba) |
| — | DF | ISR | Yagil Biton (from (Israel) Maccabi Herzliya) |
| — | MF | ISR | Ruslan Berski (from (Israel) Maccabi Tel Aviv) |
| — | MF | ISR | Shay Nissim (from (Israel) Hapoel Kfar Shalem) |
| — | MF | ISR | Adi Soffer (from (Israel) Maccabi Netanya) |
| — | MF | ISR | Yoni Uzan (on loan from (Israel) Hapoel Be'er Sheva) |
| — | MF | ISR | Barak Moshe (from (Israel) Beitar Jerusalem) |
| — | FW | ARG | Jesús Baldaccini (from (Chile) Unión San Felipe) |

Out:

| No. | Pos. | Nation | Player |
|---|---|---|---|
| — | GK | ISR | Yaniv Ben Harush (to (Israel) Ironi Beit Shemesh) |
| — | DF | ISR | Netanel Ben Simon (was on loan from (Israel) Beitar Jerusalem) |
| — | DF | ISR | Uri Avraham (to (Israel) Maccabi Yavne) |
| — | DF | ISR | Yonathan Zada (to (Israel) Hapoel Katamon Jerusalem) |
| — | DF | ISR | Maoz Samia (to (Israel) Beitar Tel Aviv Ramla) |
| — | DF | ISR | Rotem Buskila (on loan to (Israel) Hapoel Azor) |
| — | MF | ISR | Ben Butbul (was on loan from (Israel) F.C. Ashdod) |
| — | MF | ISR | Idan Sade (to (Israel) Hapoel Ashkelon) |
| — | MF | ISR | Yossi Biton (on loan to (Israel) Hapoel Bnei Lod) |
| — | MF | ISR | Elior Sado (on loan to (Israel) Beitar Giv'at Ze'ev) |
| — | MF | ISR | Adir Elkaslasy (on loan to (Israel) Beitar Giv'at Ze'ev) |
| — | FW | ISR | Hen Mantzuri (to (Israel) Maccabi Sha'arayim) |
| — | FW | ISR | Alon Buzorgi (to (Israel) Ironi Tiberias) |
| — | FW | ISR | Netanel Sharvit (on loan to (Israel) Beitar Ironi Ma'ale Adumim) |

=== Hakoah Amidar Ramat Gan ===
In:

| No. | Pos. | Nation | Player |
|---|---|---|---|
| — | GK | ISR | Yossi Ginzburg (from (Israel) Maccabi Tel Aviv) |
| — | GK | ISR | Matan Zalmanovich (from (Israel) Maccabi Netanya) |
| — | DF | GUI | Sekou Conde (Unknown) |
| — | DF | ISR | Baha Halabi (on loan from (Israel) Maccabi Haifa) |
| — | DF | ISR | Orel Horev (on loan from (Israel) Beitar Jerusalem) |
| — | DF | ISR | Mahmmoud Tales (was on loan to (Israel) Hapoel Herzliya) |
| — | DF | BRA | Heverton Zago (from (Israel) Hapoel Bnei Lod) |
| — | DF | ISR | Matan Barashi (on loan from (Israel) Beitar Jerusalem) |
| — | MF | ISR | Bar Mizrahi (on loan from (Israel) Hapoel Petah Tikva) |
| — | MF | ISR | Michael Maman (from (Israel) Beitar Giv'at Ze'ev) |
| — | MF | ISR | Orel Yosef (was on loan to (Israel) Hapoel Kfar Shalem) |
| — | MF | ARG | Manuel Goldberg (from (United States) Eastern Florida State College) |
| — | MF | ISR | Jack Yosef (from (Israel) Beitar Tel Aviv Ramla) |
| — | MF | ISR | Tzahi Elihen (from (Israel) Beitar Jerusalem) |
| — | MF | ISR | Dror Tazazo (on loan from (Israel) Hapoel Be'er Sheva) |
| — | MF | ISR | El'ad Shaked (was on loan to (Israel) Maccabi Kiryat Malakhi) |
| — | MF | BRA | Natan (from (Brazil) Canonas) |
| — | FW | ISR | Roei Zikri (on loan from (Israel) Beitar Jerusalem) |
| — | FW | ISR | Rimon Cohen (on loan from (Israel) Hapoel Kiryat Ono) |
| — | FW | ISR | Yadin Zaris (from (Belgium) Standard Liège) |
| — | FW | ISR | Eden Vainstein (from (Israel) Hapoel Hod HaSharon) |

Out:

| No. | Pos. | Nation | Player |
|---|---|---|---|
| — | GK | ISR | Tomer Chenciski (was on loan from (Israel) Maccabi Tel Aviv) |
| — | DF | GUI | Sekou Conde (to (Israel) Hapoel Petah Tikva) |
| — | DF | ISR | Hana Nasser (Free Agent) |
| — | DF | ISR | Obieda Khateb (to (Israel) Hapoel Tel Aviv) |
| — | DF | ISR | Naor Sabag (to (Israel) Hapoel Katamon Jerusalem) |
| — | MF | NGA | Michael Tukura (to (Israel) Hapoel Petah Tikva) |
| — | MF | ISR | Wahel Mresat (was on loan from (Israel) Hapoel Ironi Kiryat Shmona) |
| — | MF | ISR | Michael Maman (to (Israel) Hapoel Katamon Jerusalem) |
| — | FW | NGA | Lanry Kahinda (was on loan from (Israel) Maccabi Tel Aviv) |
| — | FW | ISR | Ben Azubel (to (Israel) Hapoel Nir Ramat HaSharon) |
| — | FW | ISR | Izhak Nash (to (Israel) Hapoel Afula) |

=== Maccabi Kiryat Gat ===
In:

| No. | Pos. | Nation | Player |
|---|---|---|---|
| — | GK | ISR | Nil Abarbanel (from (Israel) Maccabi Petah Tikva) |
| — | GK | ISR | Yotam Zigdon (from (Israel) Maccabi Sha'arayim) |
| — | DF | ISR | Ran Malka (from (Israel) Maccabi Herzliya) |
| — | DF | ISR | Avi Malka (from (Israel) Maccabi Herzliya) |
| — | DF | ISR | Yaniv Ifergan (from (Israel) Beitar Tel Aviv Ramla) |
| — | DF | ISR | David Tiram (on loan from (Israel) Maccabi Netanya) |
| — | MF | ISR | Tal Ayela (from (Israel) Hapoel Marmorek) |
| — | MF | ISR | Itzik Vaknin (from (Israel) Hapoel Ramat Gan) |
| — | MF | ISR | Firas Awad (on loan from (Israel) Hapoel Be'er Sheva) |
| — | FW | ISR | Rafi Amos (from (Israel) Maccabi Herzliya) |
| — | FW | ISR | Ran Ben Shimon (from (Israel) Hapoel Ramat Gan) |
| — | FW | ISR | Meir Elkabetz (from (Israel) Hapoel Bnei Lod) |

Out:

| No. | Pos. | Nation | Player |
|---|---|---|---|
| — | GK | ISR | Doron Rosenkovich (to (Israel) Maccabi Sha'arayim) |
| — | DF | ISR | Dor Elkabetz (to (Israel) Hapoel Marmorek) |
| — | MF | ISR | Ohad Edelstein (was on loan (Israel) Hapoel Petah Tikva) |
| — | MF | ISR | Kobi Nachmias (to (Israel) Maccabi Sha'arayim) |
| — | MF | ISR | Reuven Oved (to (Israel) Hapoel Mahane Yehuda) |
| — | FW | ISR | Sharon Gormazno (to (Israel) Hapoel Ashkelon) |
| — | FW | ISR | Omer Mula'i (to (Israel) Hapoel Marmorek) |
| — | FW | ISR | Yinon Barda (to (Israel) Hapoel Bnei Lod) |

=== Hapoel Kfar Saba ===
In:

| No. | Pos. | Nation | Player |
|---|---|---|---|
| — | GK | ISR | Ben Weitzman (from (Israel) Hapoel Afula) |
| — | DF | ISR | Amir Nussbaum (from (Israel) Hapoel Haifa) |
| — | DF | ISR | Itay Tuef (from (Israel) Hapoel Rishon LeZion) |
| — | MF | ISR | Reef Mesika (from (Israel) Hapoel Ra'anana) |
| — | FW | SRB | Branko Mihajlović (from (Serbia) Čukarički) |
| — | FW | ISR | Ran Itzhak (from (Israel) Hapoel Tel Aviv) |
| — | FW | ISR | Omer Fadida (on loan from (Israel) Hapoel Tel Aviv) |

Out:

| No. | Pos. | Nation | Player |
|---|---|---|---|
| — | DF | ISR | Joakim Askling (to (Israel) Hapoel Be'er Sheva) |
| — | DF | ISR | Rubi Regev (Retired) |
| — | MF | ISR | Oriyan Ya'akov (was on loan from (Israel) Hapoel Nir Ramat HaSharon) |
| — | MF | ISR | Ben Levy (to (Israel) Hapoel Katamon Jerusalem) |
| — | FW | ISR | Michael Kirtava (on loan to (Israel) Hapoel Katamon Jerusalem) |

=== Ironi Tiberias ===
In:

| No. | Pos. | Nation | Player |
|---|---|---|---|
| — | DF | ISR | Miki Yazao (from (Israel) Hapoel Migdal HaEemek) |
| — | DF | NGA | Taye Babalola (from (Israel) Maccabi Ahi Nazareth) |
| — | DF | ISR | Idan Mikdash (on loan from (Israel) F.C. Ashdod) |
| — | MF | ISR | Shlomi Ben Asor (from (Israel) Hapoel Rishon LeZion) |
| — | MF | ISR | Niv Fogel (on loan from (Israel) Hapoel Haifa) |
| — | MF | ISR | Aviel Gabay (from (Israel) Hapoel Ramat Gan) |
| — | MF | GEO | Date Kirkitadze (from (Georgia (country)) Baia Zugdidi) |
| — | MF | ISR | Ilan Rankevic (from (Israel) Hapoel Ashkelon) |
| — | FW | ISR | Alon Buzorgi (from (Israel) Hapoel Jerusalem) |
| — | FW | ISR | Victor Merey (from (Israel) Maccabi Petah Tikva) |

Out:

| No. | Pos. | Nation | Player |
|---|---|---|---|
| — | MF | ISR | Omri Elmakyes (to (Israel) Maccabi Ironi Kiryat Ata) |
| — | MF | ISR | Hael Heshan (to (Israel) Hapoel Bnei Nujeidat) |
| — | MF | ISR | Niv Fogel (to (Israel) Beitar Nahariya) |
| — | MF | ISR | Matan Ariel Lazmi (to (Israel) Hapoel Tel Aviv) |
