= List of Israeli football transfers winter 2013–14 =

This is a list of Israeli football transfers for the 2014 winter transfer window

== Ligat Ha'Al ==
=== Maccabi Tel Aviv ===
In:

No.	Pos.	Nation	Player
—	DF	(France) FRA	Rémi Maréval (from (Belgium) Gent)
—	MF	(Israel) ISR	Hasan Abu Zaid (was on loan to Ironi Nir Ramat HaSharon)
—	FW	(Israel) ISR	Barak Badash (from Hapoel Ironi Kiryat Shmona)

Out:

No.	Pos.	Nation	Player
—	GK	(Canada) CAN	Tomer Chencinski (on loan to Hakoah Amidar Ramat Gan)
—	DF	(Spain) ESP	Mané (to (Spain) UD Almería)
—	DF	(Israel) ISR	Yagil Biton (on loan to Ironi Nir Ramat HaSharon)
—	DF	(Israel) ISR	Reef Peretz (on loan to Ironi Nir Ramat HaSharon)
—	MF	(Israel) ISR	Moshe Lugasi (on loan to Beitar Jerusalem)
—	MF	(Israel) ISR	Hasan Abu Zaid (on loan to (Cyprus) AEK Larnaca)
—	FW	(Israel) ISR	Omri Perl (on loan to Hakoah Amidar Ramat Gan)
—	FW	(Israel) ISR	Mu'nas Dabbur (to (Switzerland) Grasshopper)

=== Maccabi Haifa ===
In:

No.	Pos.	Nation	Player
—	FW	(Hungary) HUN	Tamás Priskin (on loan from Austria Wien)

Out:

No.	Pos.	Nation	Player
—	DF	(Israel) ISR	Ori Tzadon (on loan to Beitar Nahariya)
—	FW	(South Africa) RSA	Dino Ndlovu (on loan to (South Africa) SuperSport United)
—	FW	(Israel) ISR	Shlomi Azulay (on loan to Beitar Jerusalem)
—	FW	(Israel) ISR	Hen Azriel (on loan to Bnei Yehuda Tel Aviv)
—	FW	(Israel) ISR	Weaam Amasha (to Hapoel Ironi Kiryat Shmona)

=== Hapoel Tel Aviv ===
In:

No.	Pos.	Nation	Player
—	DF	(Israel) ISR	Uri Cohen (from Hapoel Katamon Jerusalem)
—	FW	(Montenegro) MNE	Petar Orlandić (on loan from (Montenegro) Zeta)

Out:

No.	Pos.	Nation	Player
—	DF	(Israel) ISR	I'yad Hutba (on loan to Maccabi Ahi Nazareth)
—	MF	(Israel) ISR	Reef Mesika (to Hapoel Ra'anana)
—	FW	(Israel) ISR	Itay Shechter (on loan to (France) Nantes)
—	FW	(Israel) ISR	Amit Amzaleg (on loan to Hapoel Acre)

=== Bnei Yehuda Tel Aviv ===
In:

No.	Pos.	Nation	Player
—	DF	(Israel) ISR	Omer Vered (was Free Agent)
—	MF	(Gibraltar) GIB	Liam Walker (from (Spain) San Roque)
—	FW	(England) ENG	James Keene (from (Sweden) Elfsborg)
—	FW	(Israel) ISR	Hen Azriel (on loan from Maccabi Haifa)
—	FW	(Israel) ISR	Ohad Kadousi (from (Switzerland) Lausanne-Sport)

Out:

No.	Pos.	Nation	Player
—	MF	(Senegal) SEN	Yoro Lamine (Free Agent)
—	FW	(Hungary) HUN	Ádám Hrepka (Free Agent)

=== Hapoel Ironi Kiryat Shmona ===
In:

No.	Pos.	Nation	Player
—	GK	(Israel) ISR	Baha Diab (was Free Agent)
—	MF	(Israel) ISR	Roi Kahat (from Maccabi Yavne)
—	FW	(Zambia) ZAM	Rodgers Kola (from (Belgium) Gent)
—	FW	(Israel) ISR	Weaam Amasha (from Maccabi Haifa)

Out:

No.	Pos.	Nation	Player
—	DF	(Serbia) SRB	Dušan Matović (to Beitar Jerusalem)
—	MF	(North Macedonia) MKD	Darko Tasevski (to (Thailand) Bangkok Glass)
—	MF	(Israel) ISR	Ehud Ma'arvi (on loan to Hapoel Afula)
—	FW	(Israel) ISR	Ahmad Saba'a (on loan to Hapoel Ra'anana)
—	FW	(Israel) ISR	Barak Badash (to Maccabi Tel Aviv)

=== Hapoel Nir Ramat HaSharon ===
In:

No.	Pos.	Nation	Player
—	DF	(Israel) ISR	Yagil Biton (on loan from Maccabi Tel Aviv)
—	DF	(Israel) ISR	Reef Peretz (on loan from Maccabi Tel Aviv)
—	DF	(Israel) ISR	Dor Malichi (from Hapoel Ramat Gan)
—	MF	(Israel) ISR	Mohamed Azberga (from Hapoel Bnei Lod)
—	FW	(Israel) ISR	Yosef Abu Laben (from Hapoel Be'er Sheva)

Out:

No.	Pos.	Nation	Player
—	DF	(Israel) ISR	Meir Gabay (to Hapoel Ashkelon)
—	DF	(Bosnia and Herzegovina) BIH	Jadranko Bogičević (to (Bosnia and Herzegovina) Olimpic Sarajevo)
—	DF	(Israel) ISR	Asael Ben Shabat (to (Greece) Panthrakikos)
—	MF	(Israel) ISR	Omer Levy (Free Agent)
—	MF	(Israel) ISR	Hasan Abu Zaid (was on loan from Maccabi Tel Aviv)
—	FW	(Israel) ISR	Fadi Zidan (on loan to F.C. Kafr Qasim)

=== F.C. Ashdod ===
In:

No.	Pos.	Nation	Player
—	FW	(France) FRA	Gaëtan Varenne (was Free Agent)

Out:

No.	Pos.	Nation	Player
—	DF	(Israel) ISR	Adi Tamir (on loan to Hakoah Amidar Ramat Gan)

=== Hapoel Be'er Sheva ===
In:

No.	Pos.	Nation	Player
—	MF	(Belgium) BEL	David Hubert (from (Belgium) Gent)

Out:

No.	Pos.	Nation	Player
—	DF	(Bosnia and Herzegovina) BIH	Bojan Marković ( (Azerbaijan) Ravan Baku)
—	MF	(Israel) ISR	Firas Awad (on loan to Hapoel Bnei Lod)
—	FW	(Israel) ISR	Yosef Abu Laben (to Ironi Nir Ramat HaSharon)

=== Hapoel Haifa ===
In:

No.	Pos.	Nation	Player
—	MF	(Israel) ISR	David Revivo (from Beitar Jerusalem)

Out:

No.	Pos.	Nation	Player
—	GK	(Israel) ISR	Yarden Krishtol (on loan to Hapoel Acre)
—	DF	(Israel) ISR	Niv Serdal (on loan to F.C. Nazareth Illit)
—	MF	(Serbia) SRB	Nebojša Marinković (to (Australia) Perth Glory)
—	FW	(Israel) ISR	Eli Elbaz (on loan to Maccabi Ahi Nazareth)

=== Beitar Jerusalem ===
In:

No.	Pos.	Nation	Player
—	DF	(Serbia) SRB	Dušan Matović (from Ironi Kiryat Shmona)
—	MF	(Spain) ESP	Jonathan Vila (on loan from (Spain) Celta de Vigo)
—	MF	(Israel) ISR	Moshe Lugasi (on loan from Maccabi Tel Aviv)
—	MF	(Argentina) ARG	Pablo Brandán (from (China) Liaoning Whowin)
—	MF	(Israel) ISR	Dani Preda (from Maccabi Petah Tikva)
—	FW	(Israel) ISR	Shlomi Azulay (on loan from Maccabi Haifa)

Out:

No.	Pos.	Nation	Player
—	DF	(Democratic Republic of the Congo) COD	Landry Mulemo (Free Agent)
—	DF	(Israel) ISR	Matan Barashi (on loan to Hapoel Katamon Jerusalem)
—	DF	(Israel) ISR	Tomer Yerucham (on loan to Maccaib Yavne)
—	DF	(Israel) ISR	Netanel Ben Simon (to Hapoel Jerusalem)
—	MF	(Nigeria) NGA	Osa Guobadia (Free Agent)
—	MF	(Israel) ISR	David Revivo (to Hapoel Haifa)
—	MF	(Israel) ISR	Evyatar Baruchyan (to Hapoel Katamon Jerusalem)
—	FW	(Sierra Leone) SLE	Teteh Bangura (was on loan from (Turkey) Bursaspor)
—	FW	(Israel) ISR	Eden Nachmani (loan to Sektzia Nes Tziona)

=== Hapoel Acre ===
In:

No.	Pos.	Nation	Player
—	GK	(Israel) ISR	Yarden Krishtol (on loan from Hapoel Haifa)
—	DF	(Israel) ISR	Alon Ziv (from Hapoel Ra'anana)
—	MF	(Israel) ISR	Ismaeel Ryan (on loan from Maccabi Haifa)
—	FW	(Israel) ISR	Yossi Asayag (from Hapoel Ramat Gan)
—	FW	(Israel) ISR	Amit Amzaleg (on loan from Hapoel Tel Aviv)
—	FW	(Albania) ALB	Hamdi Salihi (from (China) Jiangsu Sainty)

Out:

No.	Pos.	Nation	Player
—	FW	(Brazil) BRA	Leandrão (Free Agent)

=== Bnei Sakhnin ===
In:

No.	Pos.	Nation	Player
—	MF	(Spain) ESP	Jorge Alonso (from (Spain) Leganés)
—	MF	(Spain) ESP	Albert Crusat (was Free Agent)
—	FW	(Spain) ESP	Marc Fernández (from (Spain) Mallorca B)

Out:

No.	Pos.	Nation	Player
—	MF	(Nigeria) NGA	Sunny (to (Bulgaria) CSKA Sofia)
—	FW	(Serbia) SRB	Marko Markovski (Free Agent)
—	FW	(Israel) ISR	Ubada Zvidat (on loan to Hapoel Bnei Nujeidat)
—	FW	(Israel) ISR	Ahmed Nahia (on loan to Hapoel Ashkelon)

=== Maccabi Petah Tikva ===
In:

No.	Pos.	Nation	Player
—	MF	(Finland) FIN	Erfan Zeneli (from (Finland) HJK Helsinki)
—	FW	(Montenegro) MNE	Luka Rotković (from (Montenegro) Mornar)

Out:

No.	Pos.	Nation	Player
—	DF	(Slovenia) SVN	Bojan Đukić (Free Agent)
—	DF	(Israel) ISR	Omri Nakadi (on loan to Hapoel Herzliya)
—	MF	(Israel) ISR	Yossi Ofir (to Maccabi Yavne)
—	FW	(Israel) ISR	Guy Melamed (on loan to Maccabi Herzliya)
—	FW	(Nigeria) NGA	Emmanuel Ogude (to Hapoel Ashkelon)
—	FW	(Israel) ISR	Dani Preda (to Beitar Jerusalem)

=== Hapoel Ra'anana ===
In:

No.	Pos.	Nation	Player
—	DF	(Zambia) ZAM	Francis Kasonde (from (Democratic Republic of the Congo) TP Mazembe)
—	MF	(Israel) ISR	Reef Mesika (from Hapoel Tel Aviv)
—	FW	(Brazil) BRA	Liliu (from (Cyprus) Ethnikos Achna)
—	FW	(Israel) ISR	Raz Cohen (was free agent)
—	FW	(Israel) ISR	Ahmad Saba'a (from Hapoel Ironi Kiryat Shmona)

Out:

No.	Pos.	Nation	Player
—	DF	(Israel) ISR	Adi Sheleg (to Hapoel Rishon LeZion)
—	DF	(Israel) ISR	Alon Ziv (to Hapoel Acre)
—	MF	(Israel) ISR	Ben Malka (to Maccabi Netanya)
—	FW	(Brazil) BRA	Eudis (to Maccabi Herzliya)
—	FW	(Israel) ISR	Noam Ivgi (on loan to Hapoel Herzliya)

== Liga Leumit ==
=== Maccabi Netanya ===
In:

No.	Pos.	Nation	Player
—	MF	(Israel) ISR	Ben Malka (from Hapoel Ra'anana)

Out:

No.	Pos.	Nation	Player
—	DF	(Israel) ISR	Din Gabay (on loan to Beitar Tel Aviv Ramla)
—	DF	(Israel) ISR	David Tiram (on loan to F.C. Kafr Qasim)

=== Hapoel Ramat Gan ===
In:

No.	Pos.	Nation	Player
—	MF	(Israel) ISR	Itzik Vaknin (from Maccabi Be'er Sheva)
—	FW	(Israel) ISR	Ran Ben Shimon (from Hapoel Bnei Lod)

Out:

No.	Pos.	Nation	Player
—	DF	(Israel) ISR	Tamir Ben Ami (Retired)
—	DF	(Israel) ISR	Lior Reuven (to Hapoel Bnei Lod)
—	DF	(Israel) ISR	Dor Malichi (to Ironi Nir Ramat HaSharon)
—	MF	(Israel) ISR	Dan Roman (to Hapoel Katamon Jerusalem)
—	FW	(Israel) ISR	Yosef Asayag (to Hapoel Acre)

=== F.C. Nazareth Illit ===
In:

No.	Pos.	Nation	Player
—	DF	(Israel) ISR	Niv Serdal (on loan from Hapoel Haifa)
—	MF	(Israel) ISR	Rotem Shmul (from Hapoel Ashkelon)
—	MF	(Israel) ISR	Osama Shaban (from Maccabi Umm al-Fahm)

Out:

No.	Pos.	Nation	Player
—	MF	(Israel) ISR	Yaniv Levi (on loan to Maccabi Tzur Shalom)
—	MF	(Israel) ISR	Mohamed Abbas (to Maccabi Kafr Kana)
—	MF	(Israel) ISR	Yaniv Deri (on loan to Hapoel Beit She'an)
—	MF	(Israel) ISR	Iyad Slbes (on loan to Maccabi Kafr Kanna)
—	MF	(Israel) ISR	Wahel Mresat (to Hakoah Amidar Ramat Gan)
—	FW	(Israel) ISR	Medan Steinberg (to F.C. Karmiel/Safed)

=== Hapoel Jerusalem ===
In:

No.	Pos.	Nation	Player
—	DF	(Israel) ISR	Netanel Ben Simon (from Beitar Jerusalem)
—	MF	(Brazil) BRA	Diego Kachuba (from (Brazil) Criciúma)
—	FW	(Israel) ISR	Nevo Mizrahi (from Maccabi Yavne)

Out:

No.	Pos.	Nation	Player
—	MF	(Israel) ISR	Adi Saloniki (on loan to Maccabi Amishav Petah Tikva)

=== Hapoel Petah Tikva ===
In:

No.	Pos.	Nation	Player

Out:

No.	Pos.	Nation	Player
—	DF	(Israel) ISR	Yarden Hanuka (on loan to Hapoel Mahane Yehuda)
—	DF	(Israel) ISR	Ido Saunders (to Hapoel Afula)
—	MF	(Israel) ISR	Lauren Ben Ari (to Hapoel Ashkelon)

=== Hapoel Rishon LeZion ===
In:

No.	Pos.	Nation	Player
—	DF	(Israel) ISR	Adi Sheleg (from Hapoel Ra'anana)
—	DF	(Israel) ISR	Gal Sapir (from Hapoel Afula)
—	MF	(Argentina) ARG	Fernando Matias Martin (Unknown)
—	MF	(Brazil) BRA	Thiage de Freitas (was Free Agent)

Out:

No.	Pos.	Nation	Player
—	DF	(Nigeria) NGA	Magalan Ugochukwu (to Beitar Tel Aviv Ramla)
—	MF	(Israel) ISR	Alon Sade (on loan to Maccabi Amishav Petah Tikva)
—	MF	(Israel) ISR	Moti Malka (to Hapoel Marmorek)

=== Maccabi Herzliya ===
In:

No.	Pos.	Nation	Player
—	GK	(Israel) ISR	Daniel Lifshitz (from Hakoah Amidar Ramat Gan)
—	DF	(Israel) ISR	Or Lagrisi (on loan from Hapoel Haifa)
—	MF	(France) FRA	Jordan Faucher (from (Belgium) Royal Antwerp)
—	FW	(Israel) ISR	Guy Melamed (on loan to Maccabi Petah Tikva)

Out:

No.	Pos.	Nation	Player

=== Hapoel Bnei Lod ===
In:

No.	Pos.	Nation	Player
—	DF	(Israel) ISR	Lior Reuven (from Hapoel Ramat Gan)
—	MF	(Israel) ISR	Gil Blumstein (from Hapoel Ashkelon)
—	MF	(Israel) ISR	Rashid Adwi (from F.C. Tur'an)
—	MF	(Israel) ISR	Firas Awad (on loan from Hapoel Be'er Sheva)
—	MF	(Nigeria) NGA	Chimezie Mbah (from (Belgium) Waasland-Beveren)
—	FW	(Ivory Coast) CIV	Serge Ayeli (from Maccabi Ahi Nazareth)
—	FW	(Israel) ISR	Me'ir Elkabetz (from Maccabi Kiryat Gat)

Out:

No.	Pos.	Nation	Player
—	DF	(Israel) ISR	Oded Amitay (to Hapoel Azor)
—	MF	(Israel) ISR	Mohamed Azberga (to Ironi Nir Ramat HaSharon)
—	FW	(Israel) ISR	Ran Ben Shimon (to Hapoel Ramat Gan)

=== Maccabi Yavne ===
In:

No.	Pos.	Nation	Player
—	MF	(Israel) ISR	Yossi Ofir (from Maccabi Petah Tikva)
—	FW	(Ukraine) UKR	Sergiy Tretyak (was free agent)
—	FW	(Bulgaria) BUL	Miroslav Antonov (from (Bulgaria) Montana)
—	FW	(Bulgaria) BUL	Antonio Pavlov (from (Bulgaria) Bansko)

Out:

No.	Pos.	Nation	Player
—	DF	(Israel) ISR	Rahamim Checkol (to Hakoah Amidar Ramat Gan)
—	DF	(Israel) ISR	Din Itzhak (to Sektzia Nes Tziona)
—	MF	(Israel) ISR	Takala Amsalesh (to Maccabi Sha'arayim)
—	MF	(Israel) ISR	Roi Kahat (to Ironi Kiryat Shmona)

=== Maccabi Ahi Nazareth ===
In:

No.	Pos.	Nation	Player
—	GK	(Israel) ISR	Tarek Natour (from Maccabi Ironi Kiryat Ata)
—	DF	(Israel) ISR	I'yad Hutba (on loan from Hapoel Tel Aviv)
—	FW	(Israel) ISR	Eli Elbaz (on loan from Hapoel Haifa)
—	FW	(Slovenia) SVN	David Poljanec (from Austria Klagenfurt)

Out:

No.	Pos.	Nation	Player
—	DF	(Israel) ISR	Islam Kna'an (to Hapoel Daliyat al-Karmel)
—	MF	(Israel) ISR	Jonathan Assous (Free Agent)
—	FW	(Ivory Coast) CIV	Serge Ayeli (to Hapoel Bnei Lod)
—	FW	(Israel) ISR	Allah Baker (on loan to Ahva Arraba)

=== Hakoah Amidar Ramat Gan ===
In:

No.	Pos.	Nation	Player
—	GK	(Canada) CAN	Tomer Chencinski (on loan from Maccabi Tel Aviv)
—	DF	(Israel) ISR	Rahamim Checkol (from Maccabi Yavne)
—	DF	(Israel) ISR	Adi Tamir (on loan from F.C. Ashdod)
—	DF	(Belgium) BEL	Dorian Mpoto Thom (on loan from (Belgium) Gent)
—	MF	(Israel) ISR	Wahel Mresat (from Hapoel Nazareth Illit)
—	MF	(Israel) ISR	Qasam Braa (from Hapoel Kfar Saba)
—	FW	(Israel) ISR	Omri Perl (on loan from Maccabi Tel Aviv)

Out:

No.	Pos.	Nation	Player
—	GK	(Israel) ISR	Daniel Lifshitz (to Maccabi Herzliya)
—	MF	(Israel) ISR	Zion Tzemah (to (Cyprus) Enosis Neon Paralimni)
—	MF	(Israel) ISR	Iman Harbat (to Hapoel Afula)
—	FW	(Nigeria) NGA	Ezenwa Otorogu (to Hapoel Ashkelon)
—	FW	(Israel) ISR	Zidan Amar (to Maccabi Daliyat al-Karmel)
—	FW	(Israel) ISR	Niv Ben David (on loan to Maccabi Amishav Petah Tikva)

=== Maccabi Umm al-Fahm ===
In:

No.	Pos.	Nation	Player
—	DF	(Israel) ISR	Said Manhal (from Hapoel Hadera)
—	DF	(Israel) ISR	Mikel Goldring (on loan from Beitar Nahariya)
—	MF	(Israel) ISR	Vik Kushnir (from Beitar Haifa)
—	MF	(Israel) ISR	Karim Houlad (on loan from Hapoel Asi Gilboa)
—	MF	(Israel) ISR	Athir Kabha (from Hapoel Umm al-Fahm)
—	MF	(Israel) ISR	Raid Jabarin (on loan from Maccabi Kafr Qara)
—	FW	(Israel) ISR	Eliran Peretz (from Hapoel Bnei Majer)
—	FW	(Israel) ISR	Mohamed Hagir (on loan from Beitar Haifa)

Out:

No.	Pos.	Nation	Player
—	DF	(Israel) ISR	Osama Shaban (to F.C. Nazareth Illit)
—	DF	(Israel) ISR	Ran Kojok (to Maccabi Kiryat Gat)
—	MF	(Israel) ISR	Tal Shmaya (to Maccabi Kabilio Jaffa)
—	FW	(Israel) ISR	Sharon Gormazno (to Maccabi Kiryat Gat)
—	FW	(Israel) ISR	Maor Ida (to Hapoel Katamon Jerusalem)

=== Hapoel Ashkelon ===
In:

No.	Pos.	Nation	Player
—	DF	(Israel) ISR	Meir Gabay (from Ironi Nir Ramat HaSharon)
—	DF	(Israel) ISR	Kfir Eizenstein (on loan from Hapoel Tel Aviv)
—	MF	(Israel) ISR	Lauren Ben Ari (from Hapoel Petah Tikva)
—	MF	(Israel) ISR	Liad Elmaliah (was Free Agent)
—	FW	(Nigeria) NGA	Emmanuel Ogude (from Maccabi Petah Tikva)
—	FW	(Nigeria) NGA	Ezenwa Otorogu (from Hakoah Amidar Ramat Gan)
—	FW	(Israel) ISR	Ahmed Nahia (on loan from Bnei Sakhnin)

Out:

No.	Pos.	Nation	Player
—	DF	(Israel) ISR	Eve Paz (to Hapoel Rahat)
—	MF	(Israel) ISR	Rotem Shmul (to F.C. Nazareth Illit)
—	MF	(Mali) MLI	Djibril Sidibé (to (France) Red Star)
—	MF	(Israel) ISR	Gil Blumstein (to Hapoel Bnei Lod)

=== Beitar Tel Aviv Ramla ===
In:

No.	Pos.	Nation	Player
—	GK	(Israel) ISR	Mikel Hakim (on loan from Gadna Yehuda)
—	DF	(Nigeria) NGA	Magalan Ugochukwu (from Hapoel Rishon LeZion)
—	DF	(Israel) ISR	Din Gabay (on loan from Maccabi Netanya)
—	MF	(Republic of the Congo) CGO	Ramaric Etou (from (Republic of the Congo) AC Léopards)
—	MF	(Israel) ISR	Phillip Manneh (on loan from Hapoel Tel Aviv)

Out:

No.	Pos.	Nation	Player
—	DF	(Israel) ISR	Zaida Trink (on loan to F.C. Shikun Hamizrah)
—	MF	(Israel) ISR	Ran Berkovic (to Maccabi Sha'arayim)
—	FW	(Cameroon) CMR	Louis Zome (Free Agent)

=== Hapoel Afula ===
In:

No.	Pos.	Nation	Player
—	DF	(Israel) ISR	Ido Saundres (on loan from Hapoel Petah Tikva)
—	MF	(Israel) ISR	Iman Harbat (from Hakoah Amidar Ramat Gan)
—	MF	(Israel) ISR	Ehud Ma'arvi (on loan from Hapoel Ironi Kiryat Shmona)
—	FW	(Moldova) MDA	Constantin Mandricenco (from (Armenia) Ulisses)

Out:

No.	Pos.	Nation	Player
—	DF	(Israel) ISR	Gal Sapir (to Hapoel Rishon LeZion)
—	MF	(Romania) ROU	Adrian Grigoruta (to (Kazakhstan) FC Okzhetpes)
—	MF	(Israel) ISR	Kevin Reinshtein (to Hapoel Kafr Kanna)
—	MF	(Israel) ISR	Shahar Simantov (to Hapoel Migdal HaEmek)

=== Hapoel Katamon Jerusalem ===
In:

No.	Pos.	Nation	Player
—	DF	(Israel) ISR	Oded Amitay (from Hapoel Azor)
—	DF	(Israel) ISR	Yehuda Hota (from Maccabi Umm al-Fahm)
—	DF	(Israel) ISR	Matan Barashi (from Beitar Jerusalem)
—	DF	(Israel) ISR	Evyatar Baruchyan (from Beitar Jerusalem)
—	MF	(Israel) ISR	Dan Roman (from Hapoel Ramat Gan)
—	FW	(Israel) ISR	Alon Weisberg (from (Ukraine) Krymteplytsia Molodizhne)

Out:

No.	Pos.	Nation	Player
—	DF	(Israel) ISR	Uri Cohen (to Hapoel Tel Aviv)
—	DF	(Israel) ISR	Zion Zaken (to Ironi Modi'in)
—	MF	(Israel) ISR	Dori Alberman (to Hapoel Mahane Yehuda)
—	FW	(Israel) ISR	Ohad Edelstein (to Maccabi Kiryat Gat)
