= Baldaccini =

Baldaccini (Italian pronunciation: [baldatˈtʃiːni]) is an Italian surname. Notable people with the surname include:

- Alex Baldaccini (born 1988), Italian mountain runner
- César Baldaccini (1921–1998), French sculptor
- Jesús Baldaccini (born 1986), Argentinian footballer
