= Shriki =

The family name Cheriqui or Cheriki is a Sephardi Jewish surname derived from the fortress municipality of Xèrica in Spain, between Zaragoza and Valencia. The Arabic name of the municipality is H̱īrīkā, and means "Oriental/Easterner".

Variants of the name include:

- Chriqui
- Cheriqui
- Chrigui
- Cherigui
- Chrequi
- Chreki
- Chreky
- Sreki
- Shriki
- Shriqui
- Sriki
- Serique
- Sriqui
- Asharqui
- Ashriqui
- Axarqui
- Esharqui
- Exarquino
- Eshriqui

Cheriqui is documented as a Jewish family name in Morocco in the first half of the 16th century. In the Iberian Peninsula they are linked to Sharquia, the eastern part of Spain covering the regions of Alicante, Almeria and Cartagena. In old Spanish documents, the two Arabic Jewish names are found as Axarqui and Exarquino. Diminutive forms comprise Ashriqui, Eshriqui, Chriqui and Shriqui. Eshriqui and Shuriqui are recorded in the 18th century. Shriqui is found in the 19th century.

It may refer to:

- Emmanuelle Chriqui (born 1975), Canadian film and television actress
- Idan Shriki (born 1981), Israeli football player
- Liran Shriki (born 1994), Israeli football player
- Shlomo Shriki (1949–2022), Moroccan-born Israeli painter and artist
