= Sagiv Cohen (footballer) =

Israeli footballer

Personal information
- Full name: Sagiv Cohen
- Date of birth: September 20, 1987 (age 39)
- Place of birth: Rosh Ha'Ayin, Israel
- Height: 1.80 m (5 ft 11 in)
- Position: Right back

Youth career
- Hapoel Petah Tikva

Senior career*
Years	Team	Apps	(Gls)
2006–2010	Hapoel Petah Tikva	68	(1)
2009–2010	→ Hapoel Ramat HaSharon (loan)	11	(0)
2010–2011	CSMS Iaşi	10	(1)
2011–2014	Hapoel Acre	57	(2)
2014–2017	Hapoel Petah Tikva	68	(4)
2017	→ Maccabi Herzliya (loan)	15	(1)
2017–2018	Hapoel Ramat Gan	28	(0)
2018–2019	Hapoel Rishon LeZion	27	(0)

International career
2003–2004	Israel U17	15	(0)
2005	Israel U18	5	(0)
2006	Israel U19	7	(0)
- * Club domestic league appearances and goals

Sagiv Cohen (Hebrew: שגיב כהן; born September 20, 1987) is a retired Israeli professional footballer.

== Early life ==
Cohen was born in Rosh Ha'Ayin, Israel, to a Jewish family.

== Career ==
Cohen had a breakout year during the 2006–07 season, but was unable to prevent Hapoel Petah Tikva from being relegated to the National league. He was rumored to be on his way out to a club in Europe, thanks in large part to his German passport, but in the end, was retained to help Hapoel Petah Tikva return to the Israeli Premier League.

At international level, Cohen was capped at levels from under-17 to under-19.
