= Omer Peretz (footballer, born 1990) =

Israeli footballer

Omer Peretz עומר פרץ
Personal information
- Full name: Omer Peretz
- Date of birth: March 30, 1990 (age 36)
- Place of birth: Rosh HaAyin, Israel
- Position: Striker

Youth career
- –2007: Hapoel Petah Tikva
- 2007–2009: Maccabi Netanya

Senior career*
Years	Team	Apps	(Gls)
2008–2011	Maccabi Netanya	16	(2)
2009–2010	→ Hapoel Herzliya (loan)	29	(11)
2011–2012	Hapoel Ramat Gan	11	(0)
2012–2013	Sektzia Ness Ziona	15	(2)
2013–2014	Maccabi Jaffa	13	(1)
2014–2016	Hapoel Tel Aviv	0	(0)
2014–2015	→ Hapoel Nir Ramat HaSharon (loan)	20	(1)
2015–2017	Hapoel Bik'at HaYarden	26	(2)
2016–2017	→ Tzeirei Tayibe (loan)	4	(0)
2017	→ Hapoel Kafr Qasim Shouaa (loan)	6	(0)
2017–2018	F.C. Ironi Ariel	24	(7)
2018–2019	F.C. Be'er Sheva	25	(2)
2020–2021	Ironi Ariel	8	(1)
2022	Maccabi HaShikma Ramat Hen	4	(0)

International career
2006	Israel U17	2	(0)
2008	Israel U18	2	(0)
2008	Israel U19	1	(0)
- * Club domestic league appearances and goals as of 22 November 2024

Omer Peretz (Hebrew: עומר פרץ; born 30 March 1990) is an Israeli footballer. In the beginning of his career he played for Maccabi Netanya F.C. in the upper league.

== Honours ==
- Liga Alef - South (1):
  - 2009-10
