= Omri Kende =

Israeli footballer (born 1986)

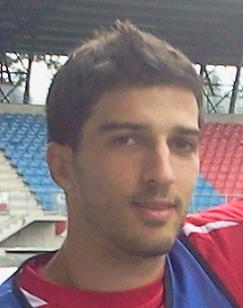

Personal information
- Full name: Omri Kende
- Date of birth: 6 July 1986 (age 40)
- Place of birth: Petah Tikva, Israel
- Height: 1.75 m (5 ft 9 in)
- Position: Right back

Team information
- Current team: Hapoel Jerusalem
- Number: 26

Youth career
- Hapoel Petah Tikva

Senior career*
Years	Team	Apps	(Gls)
2004–2008	Hapoel Petah Tikva	41	(0)
2006	→ Hapoel Ra'anana (loan)	5	(0)
2008–2012	Hapoel Tel Aviv	80	(0)
2012	Astra Giurgiu	1	(0)
2013–2014	Hapoel Haifa	15	(0)
2014–2015	Maccabi Netanya	3	(0)
2015–2016	Hapoel Jerusalem	12	(0)

International career
2005	Israel U18	2	(0)
2005	Israel U19	3	(0)
2008	Israel U21	4	(0)
- * Club domestic league appearances and goals

Omri Kende (Hebrew: עומרי קֶנדֵה; born 6 July 1986 in Israel) is a former Israeli footballer who plays as a defender for.

== Honours ==
- Israeli Championships (1):
  - 2009-10
- State Cup (3):
  - 2010, 2011, 2012
