= Netanel Ben Simon =

Israeli footballer (born 1992)

Netanel Ben Simon נתנאל בן סימון
Personal information
- Full name: Netanel Ben Simon
- Date of birth: 26 May 1992 (age 34)
- Place of birth: Acre, Israel
- Height: 1.72 m (5 ft 8 in)
- Position: Left back

Team information
- Current team: Ironi Nesher

Youth career
- Beitar Jerusalem

Senior career*
Years	Team	Apps	(Gls)
2011–2014	Beitar Jerusalem	2	(0)
2012–2013	→ Maccabi Ahi Nazareth (loan)	8	(0)
2014	→ Hapoel Jerusalem (loan)	4	(0)
2014–2015	Hapoel Migdal HaEmek	25	(0)
2015	Hapoel Acre	0	(0)
2015	Hapoel Midgal HaEmek	4	(0)
2016	Hapoel Beit She'an	2	(0)
2016	Hapoel Asi Gilboa	10	(0)
2016–2017	Hapoel Midgal HaEmek	23	(0)
2017	Hapoel Shefa-'Amr	0	(0)
2017	Tzeirei Kafr Kanna	3	(0)
2017–2018	Maccabi Daliyat al-Karmel	17	(0)
2018–2019	Ironi Tiberias	10	(0)
2019	Maccabi Daliyat al-Karmel	0	(0)
2020	Ironi Nesher	0	(0)
- * Club domestic league appearances and goals as of 1 June 2020

Netanel Ben Simon (Hebrew: נתנאל בן סימון; born 26 May 1992) is an Israeli footballer. He plays as a left back for Ironi Nesher.

== Club career ==
=== Beitar Jerusalem ===
Ben Simon made his debut with Beitar Jerusalem on 25 December 2011, of a league match against Hapoel Acre.

=== Hapoel Jerusalem ===
In the winter transfers of 2013–14, Ben Simon joined Hapoel Jerusalem.

=== Hapoel Migdal HaEmek ===
In September 2014 left Beitar Jerusalem and signed to Hapoel Migdal HaEmek. At Migdal HaEmek assisted 12 goals, and became important player at the club's squad.

=== Hapoel Acre ===
On 19 August 2015 signed to Hapoel Acre.
