= Raul Gorshumov =

Israeli footballer

Raul Gorshumov ראול גורשומוב
Personal information
- Full name: Raul Gorshumov
- Date of birth: August 13, 1994 (age 32)
- Place of birth: Netanya, Israel
- Position: Midfielder

Team information
- Current team: Hapoel Lod

Youth career
- 2005–2014: Beitar Nes Tubruk

Senior career*
Years	Team	Apps	(Gls)
2014–2016	Maccabi Netanya	6	(0)
2016	→ Hapoel Petah Tikva (loan)	7	(0)
2016–2017	Maccabi Ironi Kiryat Ata	22	(0)
2017–2018	F.C. Dimona	9	(0)
2018–2019	Hakoah Amidar Ramat Gan	14	(0)
2018–2019	Hapoel Baqa al-Gharbiyye	26	(1)
2019–2020	Hapoel Kfar Shalem	6	(0)
2020–2021	F.C. Tira	21	(1)
2021–2022	Ironi Tiberias	10	(0)
2022	F.C. Tira	18	(0)
2022	Tzeirei Tayibe	9	(0)
2022–2023	Shimshon Tel Aviv	13	(1)
2023–2025	F.C. Tira	50	(3)
2025	→ Bnei Hertzeliya	10	(9)
2025–2026	Hakoah Amidar Ramat Gan	18	(0)
2026–	Hapoel Lod	3	(0)
- * Club domestic league appearances and goals as of 1 May 2026

Raul Gorshumov (Hebrew: ראול גורשומוב; born August 13, 1994) is an Israeli footballer.

Gorshumov made his debut for Netanya on October 25, 2014, in a league game against Bnei Sakhnin.
