= Gal Sapir =

Israeli footballer

Personal information
- Full name: Gal Sapir
- Date of birth: June 10, 1990 (age 36)
- Place of birth: Ramat Gan, Israel
- Height: 1.81 m (5 ft 11 1/2 in)
- Position: Center-back

Team information
- Current team: hapoel Lod

Youth career
- 2007: Maccabi Petah Tikva
- 2007–2008: Hapoel Tel Aviv

Senior career*
Years	Team	Apps	(Gls)
2008–2012	Hapoel Rishon LeZion	134	(8)
2012–2013	Telstar	0	(0)
2013–2014	Sioni Bolnisi	3	(0)
2014–2015	Hapoel Afula	7	(0)
2015–2016	Hapoel Rishon LeZion	43	(0)
2016–2017	Beitar Tel Aviv Ramla	9	(1)
2017–2018	Maccabi Ahi Nazareth	42	(4)
2018–2019	Hapoel Marmorek	46	(0)
2019	Hapoel Bnei Lod	9	(0)
2019–2022	Hapoel Azor	56	(5)
2022–2024	F.C. Holon Yermiyahu	59	(5)
2024–	hapoel Lod	4	(0)
- * Club domestic league appearances and goals as of 1 June 2024

Gal Sapir (Hebrew: גל ספיר) is an Israeli footballer who plays for hapoel Lod.

== Honours ==
- Liga Leumit:
  - Runner-up (1): 2010–11
  - U-21 Israel national team 2011
