= Lior Jean =

Israeli footballer

Lior Jean ליאור ז'אן
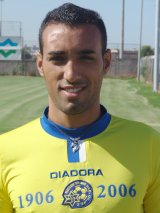

Personal information
- Full name: Lior Jan
- Date of birth: August 20, 1986 (age 40)
- Place of birth: Tel Aviv, Israel
- Height: 1.78 m (5 ft 10 in)
- Positions: Defender; midfielder

Youth career
- Maccabi Tel Aviv

Senior career*
Years	Team	Apps	(Gls)
2004–2018	Maccabi Tel Aviv	125	(8)
2010–2011	→ Hapoel Be'er Sheva (loan)	19	(1)
2011–2012	→ Hapoel Haifa (loan)	11	(0)
2012–2013	→ Hapoel Petah Tikva (loan)	25	(0)
2013–2014	→ Maccabi Netanya (loan)	27	(1)
2014–2016	→ Maccabi Yavne (loan)	46	(3)
2016–2017	→ Hapoel Herzliya (loan)	8	(1)
2017–2018	→ Hapoel Baqa al-Gharbiyye (loan)	0	(0)
2019	Hapoel Kiryat Ono	5	(0)

International career
2002–2003	Israel U17	13	(1)
2004–2005	Israel U18	5	(0)
2003–2005	Israel U19	17	(0)
2006–2008	Israel U21	26	(1)
- * Club domestic league appearances and goals

Lior Jean (Hebrew: ליאור ז'אן; born August 20, 1986) is an Israeli footballer. At international level, Jan was capped at levels from under-17 to under-21.

== Honours ==
- Toto Cup:
  - 2008–09
- Liga Leumit
  - 2013-14
