= Itay Elkaslasy =

Israeli football defensive midfielder

Itay Elkeslassy
Personal information
- Full name: Itay Elkeslassy
- Date of birth: 15 June 1988 (age 38)
- Place of birth: Netanya, Israel
- Position: Defensive midfielder

Team information
- Current team: Tzeiri Tira

Youth career
- 2002–2009: Hapoel Tel Aviv

Senior career*
Years	Team	Apps	(Gls)
2007–2010	Hapoel Tel Aviv	1	(0)
2008–2009	→ Hapoel Kfar Saba (loan)	25	(0)
2009–2010	→ Hapoel Ra'anana (loan)	23	(0)
2010–2012	Hapoel Rishon LeZion	53	(0)
2012	Ironi Nir Ramat HaSharon	2	(0)
2012–2013	Hapoel Rishon LeZion	26	(3)
2013–2014	Hapoel Petah Tikva	33	(0)
2014–2015	Hapoel Rishon LeZion	25	(2)
2015–2016	Hapoel Afula	18	(0)
2016–2017	Maccabi Ahi Nazareth	31	(0)
2017–2018	Hapoel Kfar Saba	16	(0)
2018	Hapoel Rishon LeZion	14	(0)
2018–2021	F.C. Kafr Qasim	71	(1)
2021–2023	Hapoel Kfar Shalem	65	(2)
2023–2024	Hapoel Ashdod	27	(0)
2024–2025	Maccabi Kiryat Malakhi	28	(0)
2025–	Tzeiri Tira	16	(0)
- * Club domestic league appearances and goals as of 1 June 2025

Itay Elkeslassy (Hebrew: איתי אלקסלסי; born 15 June 1988) is an Israeli football defensive midfielder. He currently plays for Maccabi Kiryat Malakhi.

== Early life ==
Elkeslassy was born in Netanya, Israel, to a Moroccan Jewish family.
