= Nitzan Damari =

Israeli footballer

Nitzan Damari ניצן דמארי
Personal information
- Full name: Nitzan Damari
- Date of birth: 13 January 1987 (age 39)
- Place of birth: Rishon LeZion, Israel
- Height: 1.88 m (6 ft 2 in)
- Position: Center-back

Team information
- Current team: Maccabi Herzliya (manager)

Youth career
- Maccabi Petah Tikva

Senior career*
Years	Team	Apps	(Gls)
2006–2014	Maccabi Petah Tikva	159	(6)
2014–2015	Maccabi Herzliya	31	(4)

International career
- Israel U21

Managerial career
- 2024–2025: Hapoel Ra'anana (youth)
- 2025–2026: Hapoel Ra'anana
- 2026–: Maccabi Herzliya
- * Club domestic league appearances and goals

Nitzan Damari (Hebrew: ניצן דמארי; born 13 January 1987) is a former Israeli footballer.

His brother is the former footballer Omer Damari.
