= Yaniv Luzon =

Israeli footballer

Personal information
- Full name: Yaniv Luzon
- Date of birth: August 6, 1981 (age 45)
- Place of birth: Hod Hasharon, Israel
- Position: Midfielder

Team information
- Current team: Hapoel Hod HaSharon (manager)

Youth career
- 2002: Hapoel Petah Tikva

Senior career*
| Years | Team | Apps | (Gls) |
| 1999–2004 | Hapoel Petah Tikva | 92 | (8) |
| 2004–2006 | Maccabi Herzliya | | |
| 2006–2007 | Hapoel Petah Tikva | | |
| 2009–2011 | Maccabi Ahi Nazareth | 27 | (9) |
| 2011–2014 | Hapoel Petah Tikva | 17 | (3) |
| 2013–2014 | → Hapoel Ramat Gan (loan) | 28 | (0) |
| 2014–2016 | Hapoel Hod HaSharon | 44 | (15) |

International career
| | Israel U-21 | 7 | (0) |

Managerial career
- 2015–2018: Hapoel Hod HaSharon U19
- 2018: Hapoel Petah Tikva U19
- 2019–: Hapoel Hod HaSharon
- * Club domestic league appearances and goals

Yaniv Luzon (Hebrew: יניב לוזון; born 6 August 1981) is an Israeli former footballer who played as an attacking or defending central midfielder or as a playmaker. Today, he is a manager for Hapoel Hod HaSharon.

== Career ==
Luzon began his career with Hapoel Petah Tikva. He has also played for Maccabi Herzliya and Bnei Sakhnin. He moved to Maccabi Ahi Nazareth in 2009.

== International ==
Luzon made seven appearances for the Israel national team.
