= Eran Rosenbaum =

Israeli footballer (born 1992)

Eran Rosenbaum ערן רוזנבאום
Personal information
- Full name: Eran Rosenbaum
- Date of birth: August 26, 1992 (age 34)
- Place of birth: Zikhron Ya'akov, Israel
- Height: 1.76 m (5 ft 9 1/2 in)
- Position: Defensive midfielder

Youth career
- 2000–2011: Maccabi Haifa

Senior career*
Years	Team	Apps	(Gls)
2011–2014	Maccabi Haifa	1	(0)
2012–2013	→ Sektzia Ness Ziona (loan)	18	(1)
2013–2014	→ Hapoel Nazareth Illit (loan)	13	(0)
2014–2016	Hapoel Ra'anana	14	(0)
2016–2017	Ironi Nesher	26	(0)
2017–2018	Maccabi Herzliya	22	(0)
2018–2019	Hapoel Marmorek	12	(0)
2019–2020	Hapoel Umm al-Fahm	20	(2)
- * Club domestic league appearances and goals

Eran Rosenbaum (Hebrew: ערן רוזנבאום; born 26 August 1992) is an Israeli footballer who plays as a midfielder.
