= Meir Gabay =

Israeli footballer

Personal information
- Full name: Meir Gabay
- Date of birth: July 3, 1989 (age 37)
- Place of birth: Kiryat Motzkin, Israel
- Position: Center back

Youth career
- 2002–2007: Maccabi Haifa
- 2007–2008: Hapoel Haifa

Senior career*
Years	Team	Apps	(Gls)
2008–2010	Maccabi Ironi Kiryat Ata	30	(0)
2010–2012	Hapoel Nazareth Illit	57	(2)
2012–2014	Ironi Nir Ramat HaSharon	19	(0)
2014–2015	Hapoel Ashkelon	25	(0)
2015–2016	Hapoel Migdal HaEmek	15	(0)
2016–2017	Ironi Tiberias	28	(0)
2017–2018	Hapoel Kafr Kanna	11	(0)
2018–2019	Ironi Nesher	25	(1)
2019	Hapoel Asi Gilboa	1	(0)
2020	Bnei Bir al-Maksur	4	(0)
2020	Hapoel Asi Gilboa	3	(0)
2020–2021	Hapoel Kiryat Yam	8	(0)
- * Club domestic league appearances and goals as of 1 June 2021

Meir Gabay (Hebrew: מאיר גבאי; born July 3, 1989) is an Israeli footballer who plays as a center back for Liga Gimel club Hapoel Kiryat Yam.
