= Mahran Abu Raiya =

Israeli footballer

Mahran Abu Raiya מהראן אבו ריא
Personal information
- Full name: Mahran Abu Raiya
- Date of birth: 22 January 1983 (age 43)
- Place of birth: Sakhnin, Israel
- Position: Left back

Team information
- Current team: Tzeirei Kafr Kanna

Youth career
- 1999–2002: Bnei Sakhnin

Senior career*
Years	Team	Apps	(Gls)
2002–2006	Bnei Sakhnin		(13)
2006–2007	Hapoel Petah Tikva	20	(0)
2007–2012	Bnei Sakhnin	76	(4)
2012–2014	Hapoel Acre	31	(1)
2014	Hapoel Haifa	1	(0)
2015–2016	Shabab Al-Khadr	?	(?)
2016–2017	Hapoel Iksal	29	(5)
2017–2018	F.C. Tzeirei Kafr Kanna	8	(0)
2018–2019	Ironi Tiberias	42	(3)
2019	Hapoel Bnei Arara 'Ara	3	(0)
2019–2020	Tzeirei Kafr Kanna	18	(0)
2020–2021	Hapoel Arraba	22	(0)
2021–2022	Tzeirei Sakhnin	24	(8)
2022–	Hapoel Bnei Bi'ina	35	(1)

International career
2004	Israel U21	3	(0)
- * Club domestic league appearances and goals

Mahran Abu Raiya (Arabic: مهران ابو ريا, Hebrew: מהראן אבו ריא; born 22 January 1983, is an Israeli professional footballer who plays for Ironi Tiberias. At international level, Abu Raiya was capped at under-21 level.
