= Ben Butbul =

Israeli footballer

Ben Butbul בן בוטבול
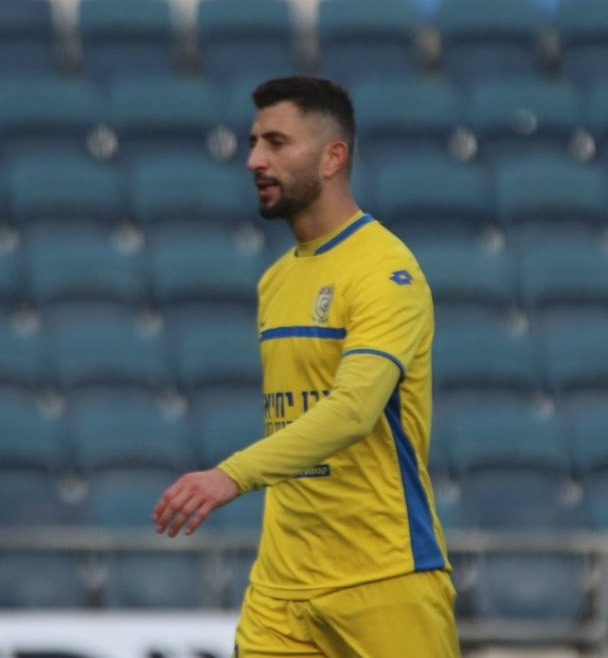

Personal information
- Full name: Ben Butbul
- Date of birth: 22 May 1990 (age 36)
- Place of birth: Ashdod, Israel
- Position: Defensive midfielder

Team information
- Current team: Hapoel Ashkelon

Youth career
- F.C. Ashdod

Senior career*
Years	Team	Apps	(Gls)
2009–2015	F.C. Ashdod	66	(1)
2013–2014	→ Hapoel Jerusalem (loan)	26	(2)
2014–2015	→ Hapoel Acre (loan)	0	(0)
2015	→ Maccabi Herzliya (loan)	15	(0)
2015–2017	Maccabi Sha'arayim	52	(0)
2017	F.C. Dimona	8	(0)
2017–2018	F.C. Kafr Qasim	16	(0)
2018–2019	Hapoel Ashdod	25	(1)
2019	Maccabi Ironi Sderot	6	(0)
2019–2020	Maccabi Ironi Ashdod	12	(0)
2020–2021	Beitar Ashdod	19	(2)
2021–2022	F.C. Ramla	14	(2)
2022	Hapoel Kiryat Ono	2	(0)
2022–2024	Hapoel Shimshon Ashkelon	42	(14)
2024–	Hapoel Ashkelon	19	(2)

International career
2008	Israel U18	2	(0)
2008–2010	Israel U19	10	(0)
- * Club domestic league appearances and goals as of 12 December 2024

Ben Butbul (Hebrew: בן בוטבול; born 22 May 1990) is an Israeli professional association football player. He currently plays for Hapoel Ashkelon as a defensive midfielder.
