= Amir Nasar A Din =

Israeli-Druze footballer

Amir Nasar A Din אמיר נאסר א-דין
Personal information
- Full name: Amir Nasar A Din
- Date of birth: 5 March 1993 (age 33)
- Place of birth: Daliyat al-Karmel, Israel
- Height: 1.81 m (5 ft 11 in)
- Position: Central defender

Youth career
- Maccabi Haifa

Senior career*
Years	Team	Apps	(Gls)
2012–2014	Maccabi Haifa	0	(0)
2013–2014	→ Bnei Sakhnin (loan)	1	(0)
2014–2015	Hapoel Nir Rmat HaSharon	4	(0)
2015–2017	Maccabi Daliyat al-Karmel	15	(1)
2016	→ Hapoel Kafr Kanna (loan)	4	(0)
2016–2017	→ Maccabi Ahi Iksal (loan)	17	(5)
- * Club domestic league appearances and goals

Amir Nasar A Din (Arabic: أمير نصر الدين, Hebrew: אמיר נאסר א-דין; born 5 March 1993) is an Israeli-Druze footballer who plays as a defender.
