= Reef Peretz =

Israeli footballer

Reef Peretz ריף פרץ
Personal information
- Full name: Reef Peretz
- Date of birth: 25 February 1991 (age 35)
- Place of birth: Hod HaSharon, Israel
- Height: 1.82 m (6 ft 0 in)
- Position: Center back

Youth career
- 2007–2009: Maccabi Tel Aviv

Senior career*
Years	Team	Apps	(Gls)
2009–2016	Maccabi Tel Aviv	17	(0)
2014	→ Hapoel Nir Ramat HaSharon (loan)	12	(0)
2014–2015	→ Hapoel Petah Tikva (loan)	11	(0)
2015–2016	→ Hapoel Ramat Gan (loan)	40	(2)
2016–2017	Hapoel Hod HaSharon	28	(1)
2017–2021	Shimshon Tel Aviv	44	(15)
- * Club domestic league appearances and goals

Reef Peretz (Hebrew: ריף פרץ; born 25 February 1991) is an Israeli former footballer who played as a center back. His brother is Dor Peretz, who is also a footballer.

== Early life ==
Peretz was born in Hod HaSharon, Israel, to a Jewish family. Peretz attended Hadarim High School in Hod HaSharon.

== Club career ==
Reef Peretz first joined the senior team in the 2009/10 season and made his debut on 15 August 2009 and, after two appearances in the Toto Cup games, he opened the first League round against Sachnin and played for 45 minutes. That season, Peretz was still part of the Maccabi Tel Aviv junior squad, and he again played in a Toto Cup game. In the final League round of that season, Peretz played in the game that ended in a victory over F.C. Ashdod. In the 2010/11 season, Peretz played on the senior team in eight League games and won a double title with the Club's junior team. Unfortunately, a knee injury forced the young defender to watch the 2011/12 season, which could have been his breakthrough season, from the sidelines.

== Honours ==
Maccabi Tel Aviv

- Israeli Noar Premier League (2): 2011–12
- Israeli Noar Premier League Cup (1): 2010–11
- Israeli Premier League (1): 2012–13
