= Din Gabay =

Israeli footballer

Din Gabay דין גבאי
Personal information
- Full name: Din Gabay
- Date of birth: September 19, 1992 (age 34)
- Place of birth: Netanya, Israel
- Position: Right back

Youth career
- Beitar Tubruk

Senior career*
Years	Team	Apps	(Gls)
2012–2013	Maccabi Netanya	4	(0)
2014–2015	Beitar Tel Aviv Ramla	30	(0)
2015–2016	Hakoah Amidar Ramat Gan	2	(0)
- * Club domestic league appearances and goals as of 12 May 2015

Din Gabay (Hebrew: דין גבאי; born September 19, 1992) is a retired Israeli footballer. He is the son of Ronen Gabay.

== Club career statistics ==
(correct as of August 2012)

Club	Season	League		Cup		League Cup		Europe		Total	
Club	Season	Apps	Goals	Apps	Goals	Apps	Goals	Apps	Goals	Apps	Goals
Maccabi Netanya	2012-13	4	0	0	0	2	0	1	0	7	0
Beitar Tel Aviv Ramla	2013-14	11	0	0	0	0	0	0	0	11	0
Beitar Tel Aviv Ramla	2014-15	19	0	0	0	0	0	0	0	19	0
Career		34	0	0	0	2	0	1	0	37	0
