= Taye Babalola =

Nigerian footballer (born 1991)

Personal information
- Full name: Agboola Babalola Taye
- Date of birth: 7 August 1991 (age 35)
- Place of birth: Owerri, Nigeria
- Positions: Left back; centre back

Senior career*
Years	Team	Apps	(Gls)
2009–2010	Hapoel Rishon leZion	0	(0)
2010–2011	Ahva Arraba	32	(0)
2011	Maccabi Be'er Sheva	18	(0)
2012	Hapoel Nazareth Illit	15	(0)
2012–2014	Maccabi Ahi Nazareth	43	(2)
2014–2015	Ironi Tiberias	27	(0)
2015–2016	Maccabi Ahi Nazareth	0	(0)
- * Club domestic league appearances and goals as of 1 June 2015

Agboola Babalola Taye (born August 7, 1991), known as Taye Babalola, is a Nigerian professional football player currently playing for Israeli National League club Maccabi Ahi Nazareth as a defender.

== Career ==
In 2009, Taye Babalola joined Israeli second division club, Ironi Rishon leZion. For the 2010/2011 season he signed with another Israeli second division club, Ahva Arraba, where he made 32 appearances.

In August 2011, Babalola signed with Israeli Premier League club, Maccabi Tel Aviv. In August 2014, Babalola signed with Ironi Tiberias.
