= Ido Exbard =

Israeli footballer

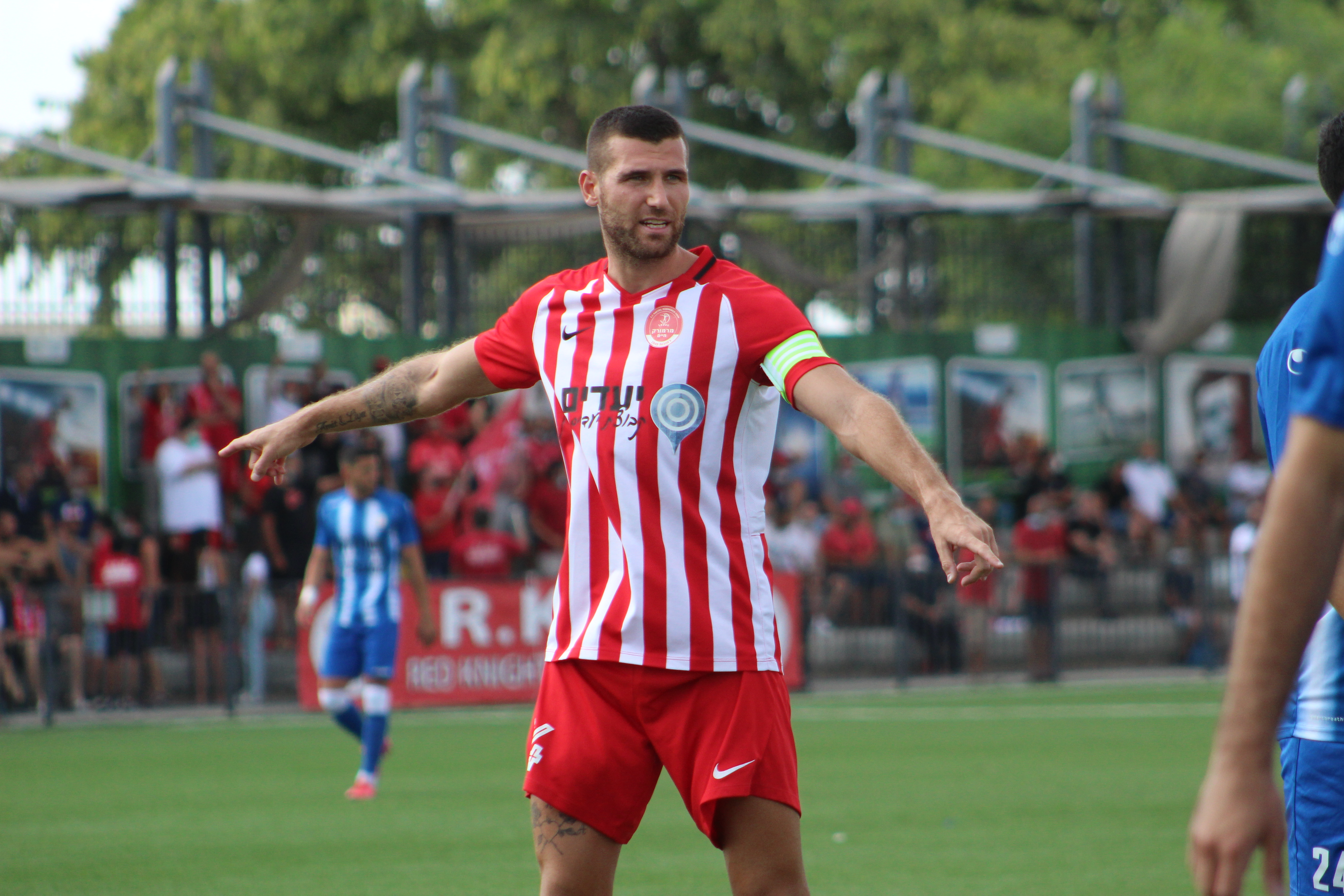

Personal information
- Full name: Ido Exbard
- Date of birth: December 16, 1988 (age 37)
- Place of birth: Tel Aviv, Israel
- Height: 1.87 m (6 ft 1 1/2 in)
- Position: Forward

Team information
- Current team: Maccabi Yavne

Youth career
- Maccabi Tel Aviv
- Beitar Shimshon Tel Aviv

Senior career*
Years	Team	Apps	(Gls)
2007–2010	Beitar Shimshon Tel Aviv	59	(13)
2010–2011	Hapoel Petah Tikva	24	(5)
2011–2013	Hapoel Be'er Sheva	56	(8)
2013–2014	Maccabi Netanya	32	(13)
2014–2015	Maccabi Ahi Nazareth	33	(21)
2015	Ironi Kiryat Shmona	6	(0)
2016	Hapoel Petah Tikva	17	(2)
2016–2017	Hapoel Acre	36	(13)
2017–2018	Hapoel Tel Aviv	16	(3)
2018–2019	Maccabi Ahi Nazareth	34	(9)
2019	Sektzia Ness Ziona	12	(3)
2019–2020	Hapoel Marmorek	26	(14)
2020–2021	Shimshon Kafr Qasim	17	(4)
2021–2022	Hapoel Marmorek	22	(6)
2022–2024	Maccabi Herzliya	49	(35)
2024	Hapoel Kfar Shalem	14	(9)
2024–	Maccabi Yavne	15	(13)
- * Club domestic league appearances and goals as of 1 February 2025

Ido Exbard (Hebrew: עידו אקסברד; born on 16 December 1988) is an Israeli footballer currently playing for Maccabi Yavne as a forward.

== Career ==
Exbard began his career in the youth department of Maccabi Tel Aviv. At the age of 14, he moved to the youth department of Beitar Shimshon Tel Aviv where he advanced to the senior team. In the 2007–08 season, he played in Israel State Cup semi-finals while Beitar Shimshon Tel Aviv was in the third division. In the summer of 2008, he was supposed to leave the team, but problems in obtaining the release from Beitar Shimshon left him playing for them for another two seasons. In the 2009–10 season, he scored 13 goals in the Second Division for Beitar Shimshon.

After lengthy negotiations and intervention of the Players Status Committee, Exbard moved in the 2010–11 season to Hapoel Petah Tikva.

In the 2011–12 season, Exbard signed a four-year contract with Hapoel Be'er Sheva.

In the 2013–14 season, Exbard moved to Maccabi Netanya. The next season Ido moved to play for Maccabi Ahi Nazareth which proved to be his finest season yet as he scored 21 league goals and 5 goals in the State Cup.

== Honours ==
- Liga Leumit
  - 2013–14

== Personal life ==
Ido has two brothers who play professional Basketball, older brother Tomer who played in the past for Hapoel Tel Aviv and now plays for AS Ramat HaSharon in the Liga Leumit with his younger brother Ofir.
