= Itay Manzor =

Israeli footballer

Itay Manzor איתי מנזור
Personal information
- Full name: Itay Manzor
- Date of birth: July 2, 1994 (age 32)
- Place of birth: Kfar Yona, Israel
- Position: Striker

Team information
- Current team: Maccabi Tzur Shalom

Youth career
- Maccabi Petah Tikva
- Maccabi Netanya

Senior career*
Years	Team	Apps	(Gls)
2013–2015	Maccabi Netanya	6	(0)
2014–2015	→ Maccabi Herzliya (loan)	30	(1)
2015–2016	Hapoel Beit She'an	28	(4)
2016–2017	Maccabi Ironi Kiryat Ata	24	(3)
2017–2018	F.C. Dimona	0	(0)
2018–2019	Shimshon Kafr Qasim	4	(0)
2020–2021	Maccabi Ironi Kiryat Ata	11	(1)

International career
2012	Israel U19	4	(1)
- * Club domestic league appearances and goals

Itay Manzor (Hebrew: איתי מנזור; born 2 July 1994) is an Israeli footballer who play in Maccabi Tzur Shalom.

He made his debut for the senior side in a league game against F.C. Ashdod on 20 April 2013.
