= Hapoel Hod HaSharon F.C. =

Israeli football club

Hapoel Hod HaSharon
- Full name: Hapoel Hod HaSharon Ironi Football Club הפועל הוד השרון
- Founded: 1965
- Ground: Neve Hadar Stadium, Hod HaSharon
- Chairman: Ilan Breuer
- Manager: Yaniv Luzon
- League: Liga Bet South A
- 2024–25: Liga Bet South A, 4th
Home colours	Away colours

Hapoel Hod HaSharon (Hebrew: הפועל הוד השרון) is an Israeli football club based in Hod HaSharon. They are currently in the south division of Liga Alef.

== History ==
The club was founded in 1965. A Previous club, Hapoel Hadar Ramatayim, which represented the settlements that merged to create Hod HaSharon in 1964, was active until the 1962–63 season.

Hapoel Hod HaSharon reached Liga Bet for the first time in 1975–76 season, where they finished second from bottom in Liga Bet South A division, and were relegated back to Liga Gimel where they played until promoted back to Liga Bet in the 1990s. The club finished second bottom in the Liga Bet South A division 2008–09 season, and were relegated to Liga Gimel where they spent two seasons, until finishing runners-up in the 2010–11 season whilst playing in the Liga Gimel Sharon division, being promoted back to Liga Bet. In the 2013–14 season, the club finished runners-up in Liga Bet South A division and qualified to the promotion play-offs. After beating Hapoel Bik'at HaYarden, Maccabi Ironi Kfar Yona, and Hapoel Rahat, they faced Maccabi Be'er Sheva in the decisive promotion/relegation play-offs. Hapoel Hod HaSharon won 1–0, with a goal by Itay Menachem in the 89th minute, gaining promotion to Liga Alef.

The team played in the Liga Alef for 4 seasons, and at the end of the 2017–18 season was relegated to the Liga Bet. Their fourth season in the Liga Alef was particularly bad, during which the team lost its first 24 games and eventually finished the season with one point, which it achieved in the 25th game of the season.

== Prominent players at the club ==
Idan Srur and Yaniv Luzon, who at the same time coached the club's youth team, which was previously coached by Alon Bromer. In the past, Tal Banesh and Matan Barashi played for the club.

== Honours ==
=== Cup competitions ===
Honour	No.	Years
Liga Bet South A Division Cup	1	2013–14
Liga Gimel Sharon Division Cup	2	2009–10, 2010–11
