= Uri Cohen =

Israeli footballer

Uri Cohen אורי כהן
Personal information
- Full name: Uri Cohen
- Date of birth: May 26, 1992 (age 34)
- Place of birth: Ramla, Israel
- Position: Left back

Team information
- Current team: F.C. Ramla

Youth career
- 2005–2011: Maccabi Tel Aviv

Senior career*
Years	Team	Apps	(Gls)
2011–2013	Maccabi Tel Aviv	6	(0)
2012	→ Hapoel Petah Tikva (loan)	11	(1)
2012	→ Sektzia Ness Ziona (loan)	11	(0)
2013–2014	Hapoel Katamon	21	(1)
2014–2015	Hapoel Tel Aviv	1	(1)
2014–2015	→ Hapoel Acre (loan)	4	(0)
2015–2017	Hapoel Katamon	66	(0)
2017	Hapoel Hadera	6	(0)
2017–2018	Bnei Eilat	15	(2)
2018–2019	Hapoel Baqa al-Gharbiyye	29	(7)
2019	F.C. Holon Yermiyahu	3	(1)
2019–2020	Maccabi Tamra	12	(1)
2020–2022	F.C. Ramla	19	(12)
2022–2023	Maccabi Ramla	52	(37)

International career
2009–2010	Israel U-18	5	(0)
2010–2011	Israel U-19	13	(0)
2011	Israel U-21	1	(0)
- * Club domestic league appearances and goals as of 1 June 2024

Uri Cohen, (Hebrew: אורי כהן; born May 26, 1992), is an Israeli football player who plays as a defender for Maccabi Ramla.

Cohen grew up in the Maccabi Tel Aviv youth academy and made his debut with the senior team in 2010.
