= Rahamim Checkol =

Ethiopian-born Israeli association footballer

Rahamim Checkol רחמים צ'קול
Personal information
- Full name: Rahamim Checkol
- Date of birth: May 8, 1988 (age 38)
- Place of birth: Ethiopia
- Position: Left back

Team information
- Current team: Hapoel Bnei Ashdod

Youth career
- F.C. Ashdod

Senior career*
Years	Team	Apps	(Gls)
2006–2015	F.C. Ashdod	136	(3)
2011–2012	→ Maccabi Tel Aviv (loan)	3	(0)
2013	→ Maccabi Yavne (loan)	4	(0)
2014	→ Hakoah Amidar Ramat Gan (loan)	1	(0)
2015–2016	Hapoel Rishon LeZion	30	(0)
2016–2017	Hapoel Nazareth Illit	22	(0)
2017–2020	Hapoel Ashdod	78	(15)
2020–2021	Ironi Modi'in	19	(2)
2021–2022	Hapoel Bnei Ashdod	14	(1)
2022–2023	Maccabi Kiryat Malakhi	27	(2)
2023–2024	Hapoel Ashdod	0	(0)
2024	Hapoel Bnei Ashdod	5	(0)

International career
2006	Israel U18	3	(0)
2006–2007	Israel U19	12	(0)
2008–2010	Israel U21	12	(0)

Managerial career
- 2017–: Hapoel Ashdod (youth)
- * Club domestic league appearances and goals

Rahamim Checkol (Hebrew: רחמים צ'קול; born May 8, 1988) is an Ethiopian-born Israeli former association footballer. He currently plays for Hapoel Bnei Ashdod. At international level, Checkol was capped at levels from under-18 to under-21.

== Early life ==
Checkol was born in Ethiopia to an Ethiopian-Jewish family. He immigrated with his family to Israel.

== Club career ==
=== Maccabi Tel Aviv ===
On 1 September 2011, Checkol was transferred to Maccabi Tel Aviv for a fee of US$350,000 plus Hatem Abd Elhamed.
