= Jesús Baldaccini =

Argentine footballer

Personal information
- Full name: Jesús Claudio Baldaccini
- Date of birth: 12 December 1986 (age 39)
- Place of birth: Mendoza, Argentina
- Height: 1.86 m (6 ft 1 in)
- Position: Forward

Senior career*
Years	Team	Apps	(Gls)
2004–2013	Gimnasia de Mendoza	115	(20)
2013–2014	Unión San Felipe	3	(0)
2014–2015	Hapoel Jerusalem	11	(2)
2015	Gutiérrez	19	(5)
2016	Argentino de Mendoza	7	(2)
2016	Rodeo del Medio	12	(1)
2019–2020	FADEP	10	(3)
2021–2022	Andes Talleres	5	(0)
2022–2023	Luján de Cuyo	6	(1)
2023	Andes Talleres	–	(–)
- * Club domestic league appearances and goals

Jesús Claudio Baldaccini (born 12 December 1986) is an Argentinian former footballer. His last club was Andes Talleres in 2023.

== Teams ==
- (Argentina) Gimnasia y Esgrima de Mendoza 2004–2013
- (Chile) Unión San Felipe 2013–2014
- (Israel) Hapoel Jerusalem 2014–2015
- (Argentina) Gutiérrez 2015
- (Argentina) Argentino de Mendoza 2016
- (Argentina) Rodeo del Medio 2016
- (Argentina) FADEP 2019–2020
- (Argentina) Andes Talleres 2021–2022
- (Argentina) Luján de Cuyo 2022–2023
- (Argentina) Andes Talleres 2023
