= Liran Shriki =

Israeli footballer

Liran Shriki לירן שריקי
Personal information
- Full name: Liran Shriki
- Date of birth: April 4, 1994 (age 32)
- Place of birth: Netanya, Israel
- Position: Attacking midfielder

Team information
- Current team: Hapoel Ironi Baqa al-Gharbiyye

Youth career
- Maccabi Netanya

Senior career*
| Years | Team | Apps | (Gls) |
| 2012–2015 | Maccabi Netanya | 3 | (0) |
| 2014–2015 | → Hapoel Ramat HaSharon (loan) | 10 | (0) |
| 2015–2016 | Hapoel Beit She'an | 23 | (4) |
| 2016–2017 | Hapoel Baqa al-Gharbiyye | 12 | (0) |
| 2017–2018 | Ironi Tiberias | 2 | (0) |
| 2017 | Hapoel Asi Gilboa | 3 | (0) |
| 2017 | Hapoel Bnei Ar'ara 'Ara | 6 | (0) |
| 2018 | Hapoel Beit She'an | | |

International career
| 2009 | Israel U-16 | 7 | (0) |
- * Club domestic league appearances and goals

Liran Shriki (Hebrew: לירן שריקי; born April 4, 1994, in Netanya) is a former Israeli footballer.
