= Hasan Abu Zaid =

Israeli footballer

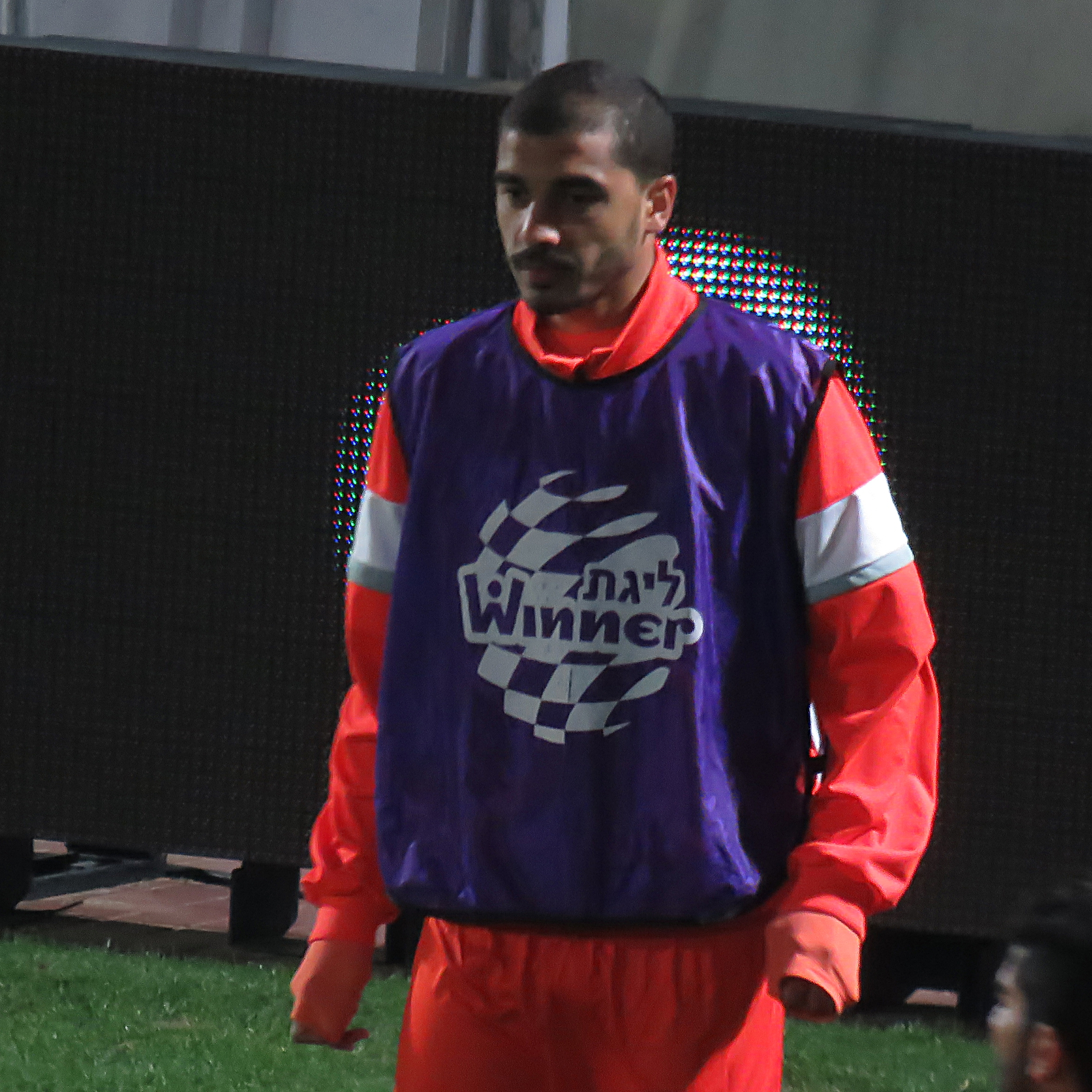

Personal information
- Full name: Hasan Abu Zaid
- Date of birth: February 4, 1991 (age 35)
- Place of birth: Lod, Israel
- Height: 1.76 m (5 ft 9 1/2 in)
- Position: Defensive midfielder

Team information
- Current team: Shabab Al-Khalil

Youth career
- Bnei Yehuda

Senior career*
Years	Team	Apps	(Gls)
2009–2012	Bnei Yehuda	72	(1)
2012–2015	Maccabi Tel Aviv	17	(0)
2013	→ Hapoel Ramat HaSharom	13	(0)
2014	→ AEK Larnaca	8	(0)
2014	→ Maccabi Petah Tikva	1	(0)
2014–2015	→ Hapoel Petah Tikva	25	(3)
2015–2016	Torpedo Armavir	5	(0)
2016–2017	Bnei Yehuda	11	(1)
2017	Hapoel Tel Aviv	14	(0)
2017–2018	Maccabi Ahi Nazareth	25	(6)
2018	Hapoel Iksal	0	(0)
2018–2019	Hapoel Hadera	11	(1)
2019–2020	Hapoel Bnei Lod	35	(5)
2020–	Shabab Al-Khalil	0	(0)
- * Club domestic league appearances and goals as of 20 January 2019

Hasan Abu Zaid, (Arabic: حسن أبو زيد, Hebrew: חסן אבו זייד; born February 4, 1991) is an Israeli footballer who plays as a defensive midfielder for Palestinian Premier League club Shabab Al-Khalil.

== Club career ==
Abu Zaid grew up in the Bnei Yehuda youth academy, where he played 3 seasons of senior club football. At the beginning of the 2012-2013 season Abu Zaid joined Maccabi Tel Aviv.

== Honours ==
Maccabi Tel Aviv

- Israeli Premier League (1): 2012–13
