= Matan Barashi =

Israeli footballer

Matan Barashi מתן בראשי
Personal information
- Full name: Matan Barashi
- Date of birth: 6 May 1988 (age 38)
- Place of birth: Jerusalem, Israel
- Height: 1.83 m (6 ft 0 in)
- Position: Center-back

Youth career
- 1996–2008: Beitar Jerusalem

Senior career*
Years	Team	Apps	(Gls)
2008–2015	Beitar Jerusalem	53	(0)
2009–2010	→ Hapoel Jerusalem (loan)	27	(0)
2013–2014	→ Hapoel Katamon Jerusalem (loan)	23	(0)
2014–2015	→ Hakoah Amidar Ramat Gan (loan)	15	(0)
2015	Hapoel Baqa al-Gharbiyye	2	(0)
2015–2016	Hapoel Hod HaSharon	9	(0)
2016	Ihud Bnei Majd al-Krum	12	(0)
2016	Nordia Jerusalem	1	(0)
2016–2017	Ironi Beit Shemesh	22	(1)
2017–2019	Maccabi Kiryat Malakhi	27	(0)
2019–2020	F.C. Jerusalem	18	(0)

International career
2006	Israel U18	1	(0)
2006	Israel U19	1	(0)
- * Club domestic league appearances and goals

Matan Barashi (Hebrew: מתן בראשי; born 6 May 1988, in Jerusalem) is an Israeli footballer who currently plays for Ironi Beit Shemesh.

He spent the 2009–10 season in the Liga Leumit on loan at Hapoel Jerusalem, and played in Beitar Jerusalem until 2013. At international level, Barashi was capped at under-18 and under-19 level.
