= List of 2010–11 Israeli football transfers =

Following is a List of 2010–11 Israeli football transfers, in the 2010 summer transfer window by each club, both in the Israeli Premier League and the second-tier Liga Leumit. For a list of 2010-11 Winter transfers in Israeli football, see 2010–11 Israeli football winter transfers.

== Israeli Premier league ==
=== Beitar Jerusalem ===
In: Note: Flags indicate national team as defined under FIFA eligibility rules; some limited exceptions apply. Players may hold more than one non-FIFA nationality.

No.	Pos.	Nation	Player
—	MF	ISR	Steven Cohen (From (Israel) Hapoel Ra'anana)
—	FW	CIV	Serge Ayeli (From (Israel) Hapoel Ramat Gan)
—	DF	ISR	Lior Reuven (From (Israel) F.C. Ashdod)
—	MF	ARG	Darío Fernández (Loan Return From (Greece) Aris)
—	DF	CHI	Cristián Álvarez (Loan Return From (Mexico) Chiapas)
—	FW	GHA	Samuel Yeboah (Loan From (Belgium) K.R.C. Genk)

Out: Note: Flags indicate national team as defined under FIFA eligibility rules; some limited exceptions apply. Players may hold more than one non-FIFA nationality.

No.	Pos.	Nation	Player
—	DF	ISR	Eliran Danin (To (Israel) Maccabi Petah Tikva)
—	FW	ISR	Barak Yitzhaki (To (Israel) Maccabi Tel Aviv)
—	DF	ISR	Eytan Tibi (To (Belgium) Charleroi)
—	DF	ISR	Arik Benado (To (Israel) Maccabi Haifa)
—	MF	PER	Junior Viza (To (Israel) Hapoel Petah Tikva)
—	MF	ISR	Idan Vered (To (Israel) Maccabi Haifa)
—	MF	PER	Paolo de la Haza (Free Agent)
—	MF	URU	Sebastián Vázquez (Free Agent)
—	DF	CHI	Cristián Álvarez (To (Peru) Universitario de Deportes)

=== Bnei Sakhnin ===
In: Note: Flags indicate national team as defined under FIFA eligibility rules; some limited exceptions apply. Players may hold more than one non-FIFA nationality.

No.	Pos.	Nation	Player

Out: Note: Flags indicate national team as defined under FIFA eligibility rules; some limited exceptions apply. Players may hold more than one non-FIFA nationality.

No.	Pos.	Nation	Player

=== Bnei Yehuda Tel Aviv ===
In: Note: Flags indicate national team as defined under FIFA eligibility rules; some limited exceptions apply. Players may hold more than one non-FIFA nationality.

No.	Pos.	Nation	Player
—	MF	ISR	Shalev Menashe (From (Israel) Maccabi Netanya)
—	FW	ISR	Pini Balili (From (Turkey) Antalyaspor)
—	FW	ARM	Yeghia Yavruyan (From (Israel) Maccabi Tel Aviv)
—	MF	LTU	Kęstutis Ivaškevičius (From (Ukraine) Kryvbas)

Out: Note: Flags indicate national team as defined under FIFA eligibility rules; some limited exceptions apply. Players may hold more than one non-FIFA nationality.

No.	Pos.	Nation	Player
—	FW	ISR	Eliran Atar (To (Israel) Maccabi Tel Aviv)
—	MF	ISR	Michael Zandberg (To (Israel) Maccabi Petah Tikva)

=== F.C. Ashdod ===
In: Note: Flags indicate national team as defined under FIFA eligibility rules; some limited exceptions apply. Players may hold more than one non-FIFA nationality.

No.	Pos.	Nation	Player

Out: Note: Flags indicate national team as defined under FIFA eligibility rules; some limited exceptions apply. Players may hold more than one non-FIFA nationality.

No.	Pos.	Nation	Player
—	DF	ISR	Lior Reuven (To (Israel) Beitar Jerusalem)
—	DF	ISR	Adir Tubul (To (Israel) Hapoel Ashkelon)

=== Hapoel Acre ===
In: Note: Flags indicate national team as defined under FIFA eligibility rules; some limited exceptions apply. Players may hold more than one non-FIFA nationality.

No.	Pos.	Nation	Player
—	MF	ISR	Roei Levi (From (Israel) Hapoel Ra'anana)
—	GK	ISR	Shlomi Itach (From (Israel) Hapoel Afula)

Out: Note: Flags indicate national team as defined under FIFA eligibility rules; some limited exceptions apply. Players may hold more than one non-FIFA nationality.

No.	Pos.	Nation	Player
—	DF	ISR	Ron Ben Nachum (To (Israel) Ironi Ramat HaSharon)
—	DF	ISR	Yaniv Chichian (To (Israel) Hapoel Kfar Saba)
—	DF	ISR	Lior Levi (To (Israel) Hapoel Kfar Saba)
—	FW	LBR	Ben Martin (To (Israel) Hapoel Nazareth Illit)

=== Hapoel Ashkelon ===
In: Note: Flags indicate national team as defined under FIFA eligibility rules; some limited exceptions apply. Players may hold more than one non-FIFA nationality.

No.	Pos.	Nation	Player
—	DF	ISR	Adir Tubul (From (Israel) F.C. Ashdod)
—	MF	GHA	Eric Nyarko (From (Israel) Hapoel Nazareth Illit)
—	MF	GEO	Zurab Menteshashvili (From (Israel) Hapoel Tel Aviv)
—	FW	GHA	Eric Gawu (From (Ghana) Hearts of Oak)
—	FW	ISR	Hanan Fadida (From (Israel) Hapoel Be'er Sheva)
—	MF	ISR	Snir Gueta (From (Israel) Maccabi Netanya)
—	FW	ISR	Eran Levy (From (Israel) Hapoel Haifa)

Out: Note: Flags indicate national team as defined under FIFA eligibility rules; some limited exceptions apply. Players may hold more than one non-FIFA nationality.

No.	Pos.	Nation	Player
—	MF	ISR	Yehiel Tzagai (To (Cyprus) APOP Kinyras Peyias FC)
—	MF	ISR	Kobi Dajani (To (Israel) Maccabi Netanya)
—	MF	ISR	Avi Avino (To (Israel) Hapoel Kfar Saba)
—	DF	ISR	Daniel Ugner (To (Israel) Hapoel Kfar Saba)

=== Hapoel Be'er Sheva ===
In: Note: Flags indicate national team as defined under FIFA eligibility rules; some limited exceptions apply. Players may hold more than one non-FIFA nationality.

No.	Pos.	Nation	Player
—	GK	ISR	Ohad Cohen (From (Israel) Hapoel Haifa)
—	MF	POR	Ricardo Fernandes (From (Cyprus) AEL Limassol)
—	DF	ISR	Oded Gavish (From (Israel) Maccabi Herzliya)
—	DF	ISR	Avi Yehiel (From (Israel) Maccabi Petah Tikva)
—	FW	POR	Bernardo Vasconcelos (From (Cyprus) AEP Paphos)

Out: Note: Flags indicate national team as defined under FIFA eligibility rules; some limited exceptions apply. Players may hold more than one non-FIFA nationality.

No.	Pos.	Nation	Player
—	GK	CRO	Tvrtko Kale (To (Israel) Hapoel Haifa)
—	FW	ISR	Ohad Kadousi (To (Israel) Hapoel Petah Tikva)
—	FW	ISR	Gil Blumstein (To (Scotland) Inverness Caledonian Thistle)
—	FW	ISR	Hanan Fadida (To (Israel) Hapoel Ashkelon)
—	MF	ISR	Yossi Ofir (To (Israel) Maccabi Petah Tikva)

=== Hapoel Haifa ===
In: Note: Flags indicate national team as defined under FIFA eligibility rules; some limited exceptions apply. Players may hold more than one non-FIFA nationality.

No.	Pos.	Nation	Player
—	GK	CRO	Tvrtko Kale (From (Israel) Hapoel Be'er Sheva)
—	FW	GEO	Akaki Mikuchadze (From (Israel) Ironi Bat Yam)
—	MF	SRB	Saša Stojanović (From (Cyprus) Aris Limassol)
—	DF	ISR	Golan Hermon (From (Israel) Hapoel Ramat Gan)

Out: Note: Flags indicate national team as defined under FIFA eligibility rules; some limited exceptions apply. Players may hold more than one non-FIFA nationality.

No.	Pos.	Nation	Player
—	GK	ISR	Ohad Cohen (To (Israel) Hapoel Be'er Sheva)
—	FW	ISR	Eran Levy (To (Israel) Hapoel Ashkelon)

=== Hapoel Petah Tikva ===
In: Note: Flags indicate national team as defined under FIFA eligibility rules; some limited exceptions apply. Players may hold more than one non-FIFA nationality.

No.	Pos.	Nation	Player
—	MF	ISR	Yisrael Zaguri (On Loan From (Israel) Maccabi Haifa)
—	MF	PER	Junior Viza (From (Israel) Beitar Jerusalem)
—	DF	ISR	Hamudi Brick (From (Israel) Ahva Arraba)
—	MF	ISR	Guy Dayan (From (Israel) Maccabi Ahi Nazareth)
—	FW	ISR	Ohad Kadousi (From (Israel) Hapoel Be'er Sheva)
—	GK	GHA	William Amamoo (From (Sweden) Vasalunds IF)
—	FW	ISR	Mohammad Natour (From (Israel) Bnei Tayibe)

Out: Note: Flags indicate national team as defined under FIFA eligibility rules; some limited exceptions apply. Players may hold more than one non-FIFA nationality.

No.	Pos.	Nation	Player
—	GK	ISR	Tzlil Hatuka (To (Israel) Maccabi Petah Tikva)

=== Hapoel Ramat Gan ===
In: Note: Flags indicate national team as defined under FIFA eligibility rules; some limited exceptions apply. Players may hold more than one non-FIFA nationality.

No.	Pos.	Nation	Player
—	MF	ISR	Idan Srur (On Loan From (Israel) Hapoel Tel Aviv)

Out: Note: Flags indicate national team as defined under FIFA eligibility rules; some limited exceptions apply. Players may hold more than one non-FIFA nationality.

No.	Pos.	Nation	Player
—	DF	ISR	Golan Hermon (To (Israel) Hapoel Haifa)
—	FW	CIV	Serge Ayeli (To (Israel) Beitar Jerusalem)
—	FW	ISR	Eliran Asao (To (Israel) Hapoel Kfar Saba)

=== Hapoel Tel Aviv ===
In: Note: Flags indicate national team as defined under FIFA eligibility rules; some limited exceptions apply. Players may hold more than one non-FIFA nationality.

No.	Pos.	Nation	Player
—	DF	RSA	Bevan Fransman (From (Israel) Maccabi Netanya)
—	MF	ISR	Yossi Shivhon (From (Israel) Maccabi Tel Aviv)
—	MF	FRA	Romain Rocchi (From (France) FC Metz)
—	FW	ISR	Ben Sahar (On Loan From (Spain) Espanyol)
—	GK	ISR	Galil Ben-Shaanan (Loan Return From (Israel) Hapoel Marmorek)
—	FW	ISR	Toto Tamuz (From (Israel) Beitar Jerusalem)
—	MF	ISR	Salim Toama (From (Greece) AEL)

Out: Note: Flags indicate national team as defined under FIFA eligibility rules; some limited exceptions apply. Players may hold more than one non-FIFA nationality.

No.	Pos.	Nation	Player
—	MF	NED	Daniël de Ridder (Loan return to (England) Wigan Athletic)
—	MF	GEO	Zurab Menteshashvili (To (Israel) Hapoel Ashkelon)
—	MF	SRB	Nemanja Vučićević (Free Agent)
—	FW	CRO	Bojan Vručina (To (Greece) Panserraikos)
—	GK	ISR	Nil Abarbanel (To (Israel) Hapoel Ra'anana)
—	GK	ISR	Boris Kleiman (To (Israel) Hapoel Kfar Saba)
—	MF	ISR	Idan Srur (On Loan To (Israel) Hapoel Ramat Gan)
—	FW	ISR	Kfir Udi (On Loan To (Israel) Ironi Rishon LeZion)

=== Ironi Kiryat Shmona ===
In: Note: Flags indicate national team as defined under FIFA eligibility rules; some limited exceptions apply. Players may hold more than one non-FIFA nationality.

No.	Pos.	Nation	Player
—	DF	ISR	Ori Shitrit (On loan from (Israel) Maccabi Tel Aviv)
—	MF	USA	Bryan Gerzicich (From (Israel) Hapoel Haifa)
—	MF	ISR	Ofir Hemo (From (Israel) Sektzia Nes Tziona)
—	GK	ISR	Guy Haimov (From (Israel) Hakoah Amidar Ramat Gan)
—	DF	ISR	Elad Gabay (From (Israel) Hapoel Bnei Lod)
—	DF	ISR	Tomer Brooks (From (Israel) Ironi Ramat HaSharon)

Out: Note: Flags indicate national team as defined under FIFA eligibility rules; some limited exceptions apply. Players may hold more than one non-FIFA nationality.

No.	Pos.	Nation	Player
—	DF	ISR	Amir Nussbaum (To (Israel) Ironi Ramat HaSharon)

=== Maccabi Haifa ===
In: Note: Flags indicate national team as defined under FIFA eligibility rules; some limited exceptions apply. Players may hold more than one non-FIFA nationality.

No.	Pos.	Nation	Player
—	DF	ISR	Arik Benado (From (Israel) Beitar Jerusalem)
—	MF	POR	Adrien Silva (On loan from (Portugal) Sporting CP)
—	MF	ISR	Idan Vered (From (Israel) Beitar Jerusalem)
—	DF	ARG	Ignacio Canuto (From (Argentina) Argentinos Juniors)
—	FW	ISR	Tomer Hemed (Loan Return From (Israel) Maccabi Ahi Nazareth)
—	FW	POR	Alex Zahavi (From (Portugal) Sporting CP)

Out: Note: Flags indicate national team as defined under FIFA eligibility rules; some limited exceptions apply. Players may hold more than one non-FIFA nationality.

No.	Pos.	Nation	Player
—	DF	POR	Jorge Teixeira (To (Switzerland) FC Zürich)
—	MF	ISR	Yisrael Zaguri (On loan to (Israel) Hapoel Petah Tikva)
—	FW	ISR	Shlomi Arbeitman (To (Belgium) K.A.A. Gent)
—	DF	ISR	Dekel Keinan (To (England) Blackpool)
—	MF	ISR	Beram Kayal (To (Scotland) Celtic)
—	MF	ISR	Mohammed Kalibat (On Loan To (Israel) Hapoel Acre)
—	MF	GHA	Sadat Bukari (On Loan To (Israel) Hapoel Ashkelon)

=== Maccabi Netanya ===
In: Note: Flags indicate national team as defined under FIFA eligibility rules; some limited exceptions apply. Players may hold more than one non-FIFA nationality.

No.	Pos.	Nation	Player
—	FW	GEO	Gaga Chkhetiani (From (Israel) Sektzia Nes Tziona)
—	FW	ISR	Omer Peretz (Loan Return From (Israel) Hapoel Herzliya)
—	MF	ISR	Kobi Dajani (From (Israel) Hapoel Ashkelon)
—	MF	ISR	Ofir Amram (From (Israel) Hapoel Jerusalem)
—	MF	ISR	Maor Asor (From (Israel) Ironi Bat Yam)
—	MF	ISR	Daniel Kaha (From (Israel) Bnei Eilat)
—	GK	BOL	Carlos Arias (From (Bolivia) Club Bolívar)

Out: Note: Flags indicate national team as defined under FIFA eligibility rules; some limited exceptions apply. Players may hold more than one non-FIFA nationality.

No.	Pos.	Nation	Player
—	MF	ISR	Almog Cohen (To (Germany) 1. FC Nürnberg)
—	DF	RSA	Bevan Fransman (To (Israel) Hapoel Tel Aviv)
—	MF	ISR	Shalev Menashe (To (Israel) Bnei Yehuda Tel Aviv)
—	MF	ISR	Ravid Gazal (To (Israel) Beitar Jerusalem)
—	MF	ISR	Snir Gueta (To (Israel) Hapoel Ashkelon)

=== Maccabi Petah Tikva ===
In: Note: Flags indicate national team as defined under FIFA eligibility rules; some limited exceptions apply. Players may hold more than one non-FIFA nationality.

No.	Pos.	Nation	Player
—	DF	ISR	Eliran Danin (From (Israel) Beitar Jerusalem)
—	GK	ISR	Tzlil Hatuka (From (Israel) Hapoel Petah Tikva)
—	GK	CRO	Ivan Mance (From (Croatia) NK Rijeka)
—	MF	ISR	Liron Diamant (From (Israel) Hakoah Amidar Ramat Gan)
—	MF	ISR	Yossi Ofir (From (Israel) Hapoel Be'er Sheva)

Out: Note: Flags indicate national team as defined under FIFA eligibility rules; some limited exceptions apply. Players may hold more than one non-FIFA nationality.

No.	Pos.	Nation	Player
—	FW	USA	Michael Greenberg (To (Israel) Beitar/Shimshon Tel Aviv)
—	GK	SRB	Dragoslav Jevrić (To (Cyprus) AC Omonia)
—	DF	ISR	Avi Yehiel (To (Israel) Hapoel Be'er Sheva)
—	DF	ISR	Haim Megrelashvili (To (Cyprus) Alki Larnaca)

=== Maccabi Tel Aviv ===
In: Note: Flags indicate national team as defined under FIFA eligibility rules; some limited exceptions apply. Players may hold more than one non-FIFA nationality.

No.	Pos.	Nation	Player
—	DF	ISR	Klemi Saban (From (Israel) Maccabi Netanya)
—	DF	ISR	Yoav Ziv (From (Belgium) Lokeren)
—	FW	ISR	Roberto Colautti (From (Germany) Borussia Mönchengladbach)
—	FW	ISR	Eliran Atar (From (Israel) Bnei Yehuda)
—	FW	ISR	Barak Yitzhaki (From (Israel) Beitar Jerusalem)
—	MF	BRA	Nivaldo (From (Spain) Real Valladolid)
—	MF	BIH	Haris Medunjanin (From (Spain) Real Valladolid)
—	MF	CMR	Albert Baning (From (France) Paris Saint-Germain)
—	DF	ISR	Avi Strool (From (Belgium) Lokeren)
—	MF	MLI	Djibril Sidibé (From (France) CS Sedan)
—	DF	MNE	Savo Pavićević (From (Greece) Kavala)
—	MF	ISR	Gal Alberman (From (Germany) Borussia Mönchengladbach)
—	FW	BUL	Dimitar Rangelov (On Loan From (Germany) Borussia Dortmund)

Out: Note: Flags indicate national team as defined under FIFA eligibility rules; some limited exceptions apply. Players may hold more than one non-FIFA nationality.

No.	Pos.	Nation	Player
—	DF	BOL	Ronald Raldes (To (Argentina) Club Atlético Colón)
—	FW	ZAM	Emmanuel Mayuka (To (Switzerland) BSC Young Boys)
—	DF	ISR	Ori Shitrit (Loan To (Israel) Ironi Kiryat Shmona)
—	DF	ISR	Yuval Spungin (To (Cyprus) AC Omonia)
—	MF	ISR	Yossi Shivhon (To (Israel) Hapoel Tel Aviv)
—	DF	BUL	Igor Tomašić (To (Greece) Kavala)
—	DF	ISR	Lior Jan (Loan To (Israel) Hapoel Be'er Sheva)
—	FW	ARM	Yeghia Yavruyan (To (Israel) Bnei Yehuda)
—	MF	SRB	Ivica Iliev (To (Serbia) FK Partizan)
—	MF	SLO	Andrej Komac (released)
—	MF	CMR	Albert Baning (released)
—	MF	ISR	Zion Zemah (Loan To (Israel) Ironi Nir Ramat Hasharon)

== Liga Leumit ==
=== Ahva Arraba ===
In: Note: Flags indicate national team as defined under FIFA eligibility rules; some limited exceptions apply. Players may hold more than one non-FIFA nationality.

No.	Pos.	Nation	Player

Out: Note: Flags indicate national team as defined under FIFA eligibility rules; some limited exceptions apply. Players may hold more than one non-FIFA nationality.

No.	Pos.	Nation	Player
—	DF	ISR	Hamudi Brick (To (Israel) Hapoel Petah Tikva)
—	FW	ISR	Ronen Schwartzman (To (Israel) Hapoel Nazareth Illit)

=== Beitar Shimshon Tel Aviv ===
In: Note: Flags indicate national team as defined under FIFA eligibility rules; some limited exceptions apply. Players may hold more than one non-FIFA nationality.

No.	Pos.	Nation	Player
—	FW	USA	Michael Greenberg (From (Israel) Maccabi Petah Tikva)

Out: Note: Flags indicate national team as defined under FIFA eligibility rules; some limited exceptions apply. Players may hold more than one non-FIFA nationality.

No.	Pos.	Nation	Player

=== Hakoah Amidar Ramat Gan ===
In: Note: Flags indicate national team as defined under FIFA eligibility rules; some limited exceptions apply. Players may hold more than one non-FIFA nationality.

No.	Pos.	Nation	Player

Out: Note: Flags indicate national team as defined under FIFA eligibility rules; some limited exceptions apply. Players may hold more than one non-FIFA nationality.

No.	Pos.	Nation	Player
—	GK	ISR	Guy Haimov (To (Israel) Ironi Kiryat Shmona)
—	MF	NGR	Felix Ogbuke (To (Cyprus) Apollon Limassol)
—	MF	ISR	Kobi Hassan (To (Israel) Ironi Ramat HaSharon)
—	MF	ISR	Liron Diamant (From (Israel) Maccabi Petah Tikva)

=== Hapoel Bnei Lod ===
In: Note: Flags indicate national team as defined under FIFA eligibility rules; some limited exceptions apply. Players may hold more than one non-FIFA nationality.

No.	Pos.	Nation	Player

Out: Note: Flags indicate national team as defined under FIFA eligibility rules; some limited exceptions apply. Players may hold more than one non-FIFA nationality.

No.	Pos.	Nation	Player
—	DF	ISR	Elad Gabay (To (Israel) Ironi Kiryat Shmona)
—	FW	ZAM	Junstine Zulu (To (Israel) Hapoel Rishon LeZion)
—	GK	ISR	Aviran Dellal (To (Israel) Hapoel Rishon LeZion)

=== Hapoel Herzliya ===
In: Note: Flags indicate national team as defined under FIFA eligibility rules; some limited exceptions apply. Players may hold more than one non-FIFA nationality.

No.	Pos.	Nation	Player

Out: Note: Flags indicate national team as defined under FIFA eligibility rules; some limited exceptions apply. Players may hold more than one non-FIFA nationality.

No.	Pos.	Nation	Player
—	FW	ISR	Omer Peretz (Loan Return To (Israel) Maccabi Netanya)

=== Hapoel Kfar Saba ===
In: Note: Flags indicate national team as defined under FIFA eligibility rules; some limited exceptions apply. Players may hold more than one non-FIFA nationality.

No.	Pos.	Nation	Player
—	FW	ISR	Eliran Asao (From (Israel) Hapoel Ramat Gan)
—	MF	ISR	Lior Linder (From (Israel) Hapoel Nazareth Illit)
—	DF	ISR	Lior Levi (From (Israel) Hapoel Acre)
—	MF	ISR	Avi Avino (From (Israel) Hapoel Ashkelon)
—	DF	ISR	Daniel Ugner (From (Israel) Hapoel Ashkelon)
—	DF	ISR	Yaniv Chichian (From (Israel) Hapoel Acre)
—	GK	ISR	Boris Kleiman (To (Israel) Hapoel Tel Aviv)

Out: Note: Flags indicate national team as defined under FIFA eligibility rules; some limited exceptions apply. Players may hold more than one non-FIFA nationality.

No.	Pos.	Nation	Player
—	DF	ISR	Rami Halis (To (Israel) Maccabi Ironi Jatt)

=== Hapoel Nazareth Illit ===
In: Note: Flags indicate national team as defined under FIFA eligibility rules; some limited exceptions apply. Players may hold more than one non-FIFA nationality.

No.	Pos.	Nation	Player
—	FW	LBR	Ben Martin (From (Israel) Hapoel Acre)
—	FW	ISR	Ronen Schwartzman (From (Israel) Ahva Arraba)
—	GK	ISR	Shaul Smadja (From (Israel) Hapoel Ra'anana)

Out: Note: Flags indicate national team as defined under FIFA eligibility rules; some limited exceptions apply. Players may hold more than one non-FIFA nationality.

No.	Pos.	Nation	Player
—	MF	GHA	Eric Nyarko (To (Israel) Hapoel Ashkelon)
—	MF	ISR	Lior Linder (To (Israel) Hapoel Kfar Saba)

=== Hapoel Ra'anana ===
In: Note: Flags indicate national team as defined under FIFA eligibility rules; some limited exceptions apply. Players may hold more than one non-FIFA nationality.

No.	Pos.	Nation	Player
—	GK	ISR	Nil Abarbanel (From (Israel) Hapoel Tel Aviv)
—	DF	ISR	Alon Ziv (From (Israel) Ironi Ramat HaSharon)

Out: Note: Flags indicate national team as defined under FIFA eligibility rules; some limited exceptions apply. Players may hold more than one non-FIFA nationality.

No.	Pos.	Nation	Player
—	MF	ISR	Steven Cohen (To (Israel) Hapoel Tel Aviv)
—	DF	ISR	Roei Levi (To (Israel) Hapoel Acre)
—	GK	ISR	Shaul Smadja (From (Israel) Hapoel Nazareth Illit)

=== Ironi Bat Yam ===
In: Note: Flags indicate national team as defined under FIFA eligibility rules; some limited exceptions apply. Players may hold more than one non-FIFA nationality.

No.	Pos.	Nation	Player

Out: Note: Flags indicate national team as defined under FIFA eligibility rules; some limited exceptions apply. Players may hold more than one non-FIFA nationality.

No.	Pos.	Nation	Player
—	FW	GEO	Akaki Mikuchadze (To (Israel) Hapoel Haifa)
—	MF	ISR	Maor Asor (To (Israel) Maccabi Netanya)
—	MF	ISR	Ravid Asher (To (Israel) Ironi Ramat HaSharon)

=== Ironi Ramat HaSharon ===
In: Note: Flags indicate national team as defined under FIFA eligibility rules; some limited exceptions apply. Players may hold more than one non-FIFA nationality.

No.	Pos.	Nation	Player
—	DF	ISR	Ron Ben Nachum (From (Israel) Hapoel Acre)
—	MF	ISR	Ben Ben Shushan (From (Israel) Hapoel Afula)
—	MF	ISR	Kobi Hassan (From (Israel) Hakoah Amidar Ramat Gan)
—	DF	ISR	Amir Nussbaum (From (Israel) Ironi Kiryat Shmona)
—	MF	ISR	Ravid Asher (From (Israel) Ironi Bat Yam)
—	MF	ISR	Ziv Caveda (From (Israel) Sektzia Nes Tziona)

Out: Note: Flags indicate national team as defined under FIFA eligibility rules; some limited exceptions apply. Players may hold more than one non-FIFA nationality.

No.	Pos.	Nation	Player
—	DF	ISR	Tomer Brooks (To (Israel) Ironi Kiryat Shmona)
—	FW	ISR	Dudu Avraham (To (Israel) Hapoel Rishon LeZion)
—	DF	ISR	Alon Ziv (To (Israel) Hapoel Ra'anana)

=== Ironi Rishon LeZion ===
In: Note: Flags indicate national team as defined under FIFA eligibility rules; some limited exceptions apply. Players may hold more than one non-FIFA nationality.

No.	Pos.	Nation	Player
—	FW	ISR	Dudu Avraham (From (Israel) Ironi Ramat HaSharon)
—	FW	ZAM	Junstine Zulu (From (Israel) Hapoel Bnei Lod)
—	GK	ISR	Aviran Dellal (From (Israel) Hapoel Bnei Lod)
—	FW	ISR	Kfir Udi (On Loan From (Israel) Hapoel Tel Aviv)

Out: Note: Flags indicate national team as defined under FIFA eligibility rules; some limited exceptions apply. Players may hold more than one non-FIFA nationality.

No.	Pos.	Nation	Player
—	MF	ISR	Messay Dego (To (Israel) Maccabi Herzliya)

=== Maccabi Ahi Nazareth ===
In: Note: Flags indicate national team as defined under FIFA eligibility rules; some limited exceptions apply. Players may hold more than one non-FIFA nationality.

No.	Pos.	Nation	Player

Out: Note: Flags indicate national team as defined under FIFA eligibility rules; some limited exceptions apply. Players may hold more than one non-FIFA nationality.

No.	Pos.	Nation	Player
—	MF	ISR	Guy Dayan (To (Israel) Hapoel Petah Tikva)

=== Maccabi Be'er Sheva ===
In: Note: Flags indicate national team as defined under FIFA eligibility rules; some limited exceptions apply. Players may hold more than one non-FIFA nationality.

No.	Pos.	Nation	Player

Out: Note: Flags indicate national team as defined under FIFA eligibility rules; some limited exceptions apply. Players may hold more than one non-FIFA nationality.

No.	Pos.	Nation	Player

=== Maccabi Herzliya ===
In: Note: Flags indicate national team as defined under FIFA eligibility rules; some limited exceptions apply. Players may hold more than one non-FIFA nationality.

No.	Pos.	Nation	Player
—	MF	ISR	Messay Dego (From (Israel) Ironi Rishon LeZion)

Out: Note: Flags indicate national team as defined under FIFA eligibility rules; some limited exceptions apply. Players may hold more than one non-FIFA nationality.

No.	Pos.	Nation	Player
—	DF	ISR	Oded Gvish (To (Israel) Hapoel Be'er Sheva)

=== Maccabi Ironi Jatt ===
In: Note: Flags indicate national team as defined under FIFA eligibility rules; some limited exceptions apply. Players may hold more than one non-FIFA nationality.

No.	Pos.	Nation	Player
—	DF	ISR	Rami Halis (From (Israel) Hapoel Kfar Saba)

Out: Note: Flags indicate national team as defined under FIFA eligibility rules; some limited exceptions apply. Players may hold more than one non-FIFA nationality.

No.	Pos.	Nation	Player

=== Sektzia Nes Tziona ===
In: Note: Flags indicate national team as defined under FIFA eligibility rules; some limited exceptions apply. Players may hold more than one non-FIFA nationality.

No.	Pos.	Nation	Player

Out: Note: Flags indicate national team as defined under FIFA eligibility rules; some limited exceptions apply. Players may hold more than one non-FIFA nationality.

No.	Pos.	Nation	Player
—	FW	GEO	Gaga Chkhetiani (To (Israel) Maccabi Netanya)
—	MF	ISR	Ofir Hemo (To (Israel) Ironi Kiryat Shmona)
—	MF	ISR	Ziv Caveda (To (Israel) Ironi Ramat HaSharon)

== See also ==
- 2010–11 Toto Cup Al
- 2010–11 Toto Cup Leumit
- 2010–11 Israel State Cup
