= List of Israeli football transfers summer 2011 =

For football clubs, this is a list of Israeli football transfers in the 2011 summer transfer window by each club.

== Israeli Premier league ==
=== Beitar Jerusalem ===
In: Note: Flags indicate national team as defined under FIFA eligibility rules; some limited exceptions apply. Players may hold more than one non-FIFA nationality.

No.	Pos.	Nation	Player
—	FW	ISR	Liron Diamant (from (Israel) Maccabi Petah Tikva)
—	MF	ISR	Ofir Amram (on loan from (Israel) Maccabi Netanya)

Out: Note: Flags indicate national team as defined under FIFA eligibility rules; some limited exceptions apply. Players may hold more than one non-FIFA nationality.

No.	Pos.	Nation	Player
—	FW	ISR	Hen Azriel (To (Israel) Maccabi Haifa)
—	FW	GHA	Samuel Yeboah (back to (Belgium) Racing Genk)
—	MF	ISR	Idan Tal (To (Israel) Hapoel Jerusalem)
—	DF	ISR	Moshe Mishaelof (To (Israel) Hapoel Acco)
—	DF	BEL	Hervé Kage (Free agent)
—	MF	ISR	Tal Meshali (To (Israel) Ironi Nir Ramat HaSharon)
—	FW	ISR	Moshe Ben Lulu (To (Israel) Ashdod)

=== Bnei Sakhnin ===
In: Note: Flags indicate national team as defined under FIFA eligibility rules; some limited exceptions apply. Players may hold more than one non-FIFA nationality.

No.	Pos.	Nation	Player
—	FW	ISR	Ohad Kadousi (From (Israel) Hapoel Petah Tikva)
—	DF	CGO	Pieter Mbemba (From (Bulgaria) Akademik Sofia)
—	MF	ISR	Maharan Radi (From (Israel) Hapoel Acre)
—	DF	ISR	Ori Shitrit (From (Israel) Kiryat Shmona)
—	DF	ISR	Oded Elkayam (on loan from (Israel) Hapoel Haifa)
—	FW	GHA	Eric Gawu (From (Israel) Hapoel Ashkelon)
—	MF	CIV	Joel Damahou (From (Germany) Kickers Offenbach)

Out: Note: Flags indicate national team as defined under FIFA eligibility rules; some limited exceptions apply. Players may hold more than one non-FIFA nationality.

No.	Pos.	Nation	Player
—	DF	CGO	Paty Yeye Lenkebe (To (Israel) Ashdod FC)
—	MF	SVN	Nastja Ceh (to (Israel) Maccabi Petah Tikva)
—	FW	BUL	Atanas Bornosuzov (to (Bulgaria) Slavia Sofia)
—	MF	BUL	Danail Mitev (to (Malta) Sliema Wanderers)

=== Bnei Yehuda Tel Aviv ===
In: Note: Flags indicate national team as defined under FIFA eligibility rules; some limited exceptions apply. Players may hold more than one non-FIFA nationality.

No.	Pos.	Nation	Player
—	MF	ISR	Yisrael Zaguri (on loan from (Israel) Maccabi Haifa)
—	FW	RSA	Dino Ndlovu (from (South Africa) Mamelodi Sundowns)

Out: Note: Flags indicate national team as defined under FIFA eligibility rules; some limited exceptions apply. Players may hold more than one non-FIFA nationality.

No.	Pos.	Nation	Player
—	FW	ISR	Moshe Biton (on loan to (Israel) Hapoel Haifa)
—	FW	ISR	Liroy Zhairi (To (Belgium) KV Mechelen)
—	GK	ISR	Ran Kadoch (To (Israel) Hapoel Haifa)
—	MF	ISR	Dor Halevi (on loan to (Israel) Hapoel Ironi Rishon LeZion)
—	MF	ISR	Assi Baldout (To (Israel) Hapoel Ironi Rishon LeZion)

=== F.C. Ashdod ===
In: Note: Flags indicate national team as defined under FIFA eligibility rules; some limited exceptions apply. Players may hold more than one non-FIFA nationality.

No.	Pos.	Nation	Player
—	MF	ISR	David Revivo (From (Israel) Hapoel Be'er Sheva)
—	MF	BIH	Mario Božić (From (Slovakia) Slovan Bratislava)
—	DF	CGO	Paty Yeye Lenkebe (From (Israel) Bnei Sakhnin)
—	FW	ZAM	Rodgers Kola (From (Israel) Rishon LeZion)
—	FW	ISR	Moshe Ben Lulu (From (Israel) Beitar Jerusalem)

Out: Note: Flags indicate national team as defined under FIFA eligibility rules; some limited exceptions apply. Players may hold more than one non-FIFA nationality.

No.	Pos.	Nation	Player
—	FW	ISR	Idan Shriki (To (Poland) Górnik Zabrze)
—	FW	BUL	Dimitar Makriev (To (Russia) Krylia Sovetov)
—	MF	ISR	Moshe Ohayon (To (Poland) Legia Warsaw)
—	MF	ISR	Yossi Offir (To (Israel) Ironi Nir Ramat HaSharon)

=== Hapoel Acre ===
In: Note: Flags indicate national team as defined under FIFA eligibility rules; some limited exceptions apply. Players may hold more than one non-FIFA nationality.

No.	Pos.	Nation	Player
—	MF	ISR	Rafi Amos (From (Israel) Maccabi Be'er Sheva)
—	MF	ISR	Amiya Taga (From (Israel) Hapoel Ashkelon)
—	MF	SRB	Nikola Simić (From (Serbia) OFK Beograd)
—	DF	ISR	Eliran Danin (From (Israel) Maccabi Petah Tikva)
—	MF	SRB	Nebojša Marinković (From (Israel) Maccabi Petah Tikva)
—	MF	ISR	Yuval Shabtay (From (Israel) Kiryat Shmona)
—	DF	ISR	Moshe Mishaelof (From (Israel) Beitar Jerusalem)
—	MF	ISR	Sintayehu Sallalich (on loan from (Israel) Maccabi Haifa)
—	MF	ISR	Liad Elimelech (on loan from (Israel) Maccabi Haifa)
—	DF	ISR	Nisso Kapiloto (on loan from (Israel) Maccabi Tel Aviv)

Out: Note: Flags indicate national team as defined under FIFA eligibility rules; some limited exceptions apply. Players may hold more than one non-FIFA nationality.

No.	Pos.	Nation	Player
—	FW	ISR	Roei Dayan (To (Belgium) Beerschot AC)
—	DF	ISR	Itzik Cohen (To (Israel) Maccabi Haifa)
—	MF	ISR	Maharan Radi (To (Israel) Bnei Sakhnin)
—	MF	ISR	Ben Binyamin (To (Israel) Maccabi Netanya)

=== Ironi Nir Ramat HaSharon ===
In: Note: Flags indicate national team as defined under FIFA eligibility rules; some limited exceptions apply. Players may hold more than one non-FIFA nationality.

No.	Pos.	Nation	Player
—	MF	ISR	Tal Meshali (From (Israel) Beitar Jerusalem)
—	FW	ISR	Baruch Dego (From (Cyprus) Apollon Limassol)
—	DF	ISR	Yaniv Lavi (From (Israel) Hapoel Ironi Kiryat Shmona)
—	MF	ISR	Yossi Offir (from (Israel) Ashdod)

Out: Note: Flags indicate national team as defined under FIFA eligibility rules; some limited exceptions apply. Players may hold more than one non-FIFA nationality.

No.	Pos.	Nation	Player

=== Hapoel Be'er Sheva ===
In: Note: Flags indicate national team as defined under FIFA eligibility rules; some limited exceptions apply. Players may hold more than one non-FIFA nationality.

No.	Pos.	Nation	Player
—	MF	GHA	Laryea Kingston (from (Netherlands) Vitesse Arnhem)
—	FW	ISR	Ido Exbard (from (Israel) Hapoel Petah Tikva)
—	DF	POR	Luis Filipe Torres (from (Cyprus) Ethnikos Achna)
—	GK	POL	Marcin Cabaj (from (Poland) Cracovia)
—	MF	ISR	Yossi Shivhon (from (Israel) Hapoel Tel Aviv)

Out: Note: Flags indicate national team as defined under FIFA eligibility rules; some limited exceptions apply. Players may hold more than one non-FIFA nationality.

No.	Pos.	Nation	Player
—	FW	ISR	Eran Levy (To (Israel) Hapoel Haifa)
—	MF	ISR	David Revivo (To (Israel) Ashdod)
—	GK	ISR	Ohad Cohen (To (Israel) Rishon LeZion)

=== Hapoel Haifa ===
In: Note: Flags indicate national team as defined under FIFA eligibility rules; some limited exceptions apply. Players may hold more than one non-FIFA nationality.

No.	Pos.	Nation	Player
—	FW	ISR	Eran Levy (From (Israel) Hapoel Be'er Sheva)
—	MF	ISR	Shay Revivo (From (Israel) Hapoel Tel Aviv)
—	DF	ISR	Lior Jan (From (Israel) Maccabi Tel Aviv)
—	GK	ISR	Ran Kadoch (From (Israel) Bnei Yehuda)
—	FW	MNE	Stefan Denković (From (Serbia) Red Star Belgrade)
—	FW	ISR	Moshe Biton (on loan from (Israel) Bnei Yehuda)
—	DF	ISR	Eliran George (from (Israel) Maccabi Tel Aviv)

Out: Note: Flags indicate national team as defined under FIFA eligibility rules; some limited exceptions apply. Players may hold more than one non-FIFA nationality.

No.	Pos.	Nation	Player
—	FW	ISR	Eden Ben Basat (To (France) Brestois)
—	MF	SRB	Saša Stojanović (To (Cyprus) Ethnikos Achna)
—	DF	ISR	Oded Elkayam (on loan to (Israel) Bnei Sakhnin)

=== Hapoel Petah Tikva ===
In: Note: Flags indicate national team as defined under FIFA eligibility rules; some limited exceptions apply. Players may hold more than one non-FIFA nationality.

No.	Pos.	Nation	Player

Out: Note: Flags indicate national team as defined under FIFA eligibility rules; some limited exceptions apply. Players may hold more than one non-FIFA nationality.

No.	Pos.	Nation	Player
—	FW	ISR	Alon Turgeman (to (Israel) Maccabi Haifa)
—	DF	ISR	Iyad Hutba (to (Israel) Hapoel Tel Aviv)
—	FW	ISR	Ohad Kadousi (to (Israel) Bnei Sakhnin)
—	MF	ISR	Rafi Dahan (to (Israel) Maccabi Tel-Aviv)
—	MF	ISR	Yisrael Zaguri (was on loan from (Israel) Maccabi Haifa, on loan to (Israel) Bnei Yehuda)

=== Hapoel Irony Rishon LeZion ===
In: Note: Flags indicate national team as defined under FIFA eligibility rules; some limited exceptions apply. Players may hold more than one non-FIFA nationality.

No.	Pos.	Nation	Player
—	MF	ISR	Assi Baldout (from (Israel) Bnei Yehuda)
—	DF	BIH	Elvis Mešić (from (Bosnia and Herzegovina) Željezničar)
—	GK	ISR	Ohad Cohen (from (Israel) Hapoel Be'er Sheva)
—	MF	ISR	Dor Halevi (on loan from (Israel) Bnei Yehuda)
—	MF	ISR	Reef Messika (from (Israel) Hapoel Herzliya)
—	DF	ISR	Amiran Shkalim (from (Israel) Maccabi Tel Aviv)
—	MF	ISR	Aviran Dalal (from (Israel) Hapoel Bnei Lod)
—	FW	CIV	Sindou Dosso (on loan from (Hungary) Kecskeméti)

Out: Note: Flags indicate national team as defined under FIFA eligibility rules; some limited exceptions apply. Players may hold more than one non-FIFA nationality.

No.	Pos.	Nation	Player
—	FW	ZAM	Rodgers Kola (to (Israel) Ashdod)
—	GK	ISR	Meir Cohen (to (Israel) Umm al-Fahm)
—	DF	ISR	Islam Cana'an (to (Israel) Umm al-Fahm)

=== Hapoel Tel Aviv ===
In: Note: Flags indicate national team as defined under FIFA eligibility rules; some limited exceptions apply. Players may hold more than one non-FIFA nationality.

No.	Pos.	Nation	Player
—	GK	CMR	Apoula Edel (From (France) Paris Saint-Germain)
—	FW	ISR	Omer Damari (From (Israel) Maccabi Petah Tikva)
—	GK	ISR	Boris Klaiman (Loan Return From (Israel) Hapoel Kfar Saba)
—	MF	ISR	Mahmoud Abbas (From (Israel) Hapoel Ashkelon)
—	MF	NGA	Nosa Igiebor (From (Norway) Lillestrøm)
—	DF	ISR	Iyad Hutba (From (Israel) Hapoel Petah Tikva)
—	MF	CRO	Mirko Oremuš (On loan from (Croatia) Hajduk Split)

Out: Note: Flags indicate national team as defined under FIFA eligibility rules; some limited exceptions apply. Players may hold more than one non-FIFA nationality.

No.	Pos.	Nation	Player
—	FW	ISR	Ben Sahar (was on loan from (Spain) Espanyol, on loan to (France) Auxerre)
—	MF	ISR	Eran Zahavi (To (Italy) Palermo)
—	FW	ISR	Itay Shechter (To (Germany) Kaiserslautern)
—	MF	ISR	Gil Vermouth (To (Germany) Kaiserslautern)
—	GK	NGA	Vincent Enyeama (To (France) Lille)
—	MF	ISR	Shay Revivo (To (Israel) Hapoel Haifa)
—	DF	ISR	Dani Bondar (To (Russia) Volga Nizhny Novgorod)
—	FW	ISR	Victor Merey (on loan to (Israel) Maccabi Petah Tikva)

=== Ironi Kiryat Shmona ===
In: Note: Flags indicate national team as defined under FIFA eligibility rules; some limited exceptions apply. Players may hold more than one non-FIFA nationality.

No.	Pos.	Nation	Player
—	DF	SRB	Dušan Matović (From (Lithuania) FK Ekranas)
—	GK	ISR	Itamar Nitzan (From (Israel) Hapoel Herzliya)

Out: Note: Flags indicate national team as defined under FIFA eligibility rules; some limited exceptions apply. Players may hold more than one non-FIFA nationality.

No.	Pos.	Nation	Player
—	FW	ISR	Wiyam Amashe (To (Israel) Maccabi Haifa)
—	DF	ISR	Yaniv Lavi (To (Israel) Ironi Nir Ramat HaSharon)
—	GK	ISR	Guy Haimov (loan return to (Israel) Maccabi Tel Aviv)
—	DF	ISR	Ori Shitrit (to (Israel) Bnei Sakhnin via Maccabi Tel Aviv)
—	MF	ISR	Yuval Shabtay (To (Israel) Hapoel Acco)

=== Maccabi Haifa ===
In: Note: Flags indicate national team as defined under FIFA eligibility rules; some limited exceptions apply. Players may hold more than one non-FIFA nationality.

No.	Pos.	Nation	Player
—	FW	ISR	Wiyam Amashe (From (Israel) Hapoel Ironi Kiryat Shmona)
—	MF	ISR	Dela Yampolsky (From (Israel) Maccabi Netanya)
—	DF	ISR	Haim Megrelashvili (From (Cyprus) Alki Larnaca)
—	DF	CRO	Jurica Buljat (From (Croatia) Hajduk Split)
—	GK	SRB	Bojan Šaranov (From (Serbia) OFK Beograd)
—	FW	ISR	Hen Azriel (From (Israel) Beitar Jerusalem)
—	MF	ISR	Tamir Cohen (From (England) Bolton Wanderers)
—	DF	ISR	Itzik Cohen (From (Israel) Hapoel Acco)
—	FW	ISR	Alon Turgeman (From (Israel) Hapoel Petah Tikva)

Out: Note: Flags indicate national team as defined under FIFA eligibility rules; some limited exceptions apply. Players may hold more than one non-FIFA nationality.

No.	Pos.	Nation	Player
—	FW	ISR	Tomer Hemed (To (Spain) Mallorca)
—	MF	ISR	Lior Refaelov (To (Belgium) Club Brugge)
—	MF	COL	Jhon Culma (To (France) Brestois)
—	DF	ISR	Mor Dahan (To (Israel) Hapoel Herzliya)
—	FW	NGA	Yero Bello (To (Romania) Vaslui)
—	DF	RSA	Tsepo Masilela (on loan to (Spain) Getafe)
—	FW	ISR	Mohammed Kalibat (on loan to (Israel) Maccabi Netanya)
—	MF	ISR	Sintayehu Sallalich (on loan to (Israel) Hapoel Acre)
—	MF	ISR	Alex Zahavi (on loan to (Portugal) Vitória)
—	MF	ISR	Liad Elmaliach (on loan to (Israel) Hapoel Acco)
—	MF	ISR	Yisrael Zaguri (on loan to (Israel) Bnei Yehuda)
—	GK	ISR	Gad Amos (on loan to (Israel) Ahi Nazareth)
—	GK	ISR	Tom Almadon (on loan to (Israel) Ahi Nazareth)
—	GK	ISR	Haim Ziskind (on loan to (Israel) Hapoel Herzliya)
—	FW	GHA	Ransford Osei (Free agent)
—	DF	ISR	Arik Benado (Retired)

=== Maccabi Netanya ===
In: Note: Flags indicate national team as defined under FIFA eligibility rules; some limited exceptions apply. Players may hold more than one non-FIFA nationality.

No.	Pos.	Nation	Player
—	FW	ISR	Mohammed Kalibat (on loan from (Israel) Maccabi Haifa)
—	MF	ISR	Ben Binyamin (from (Israel) Hapoel Acco)
—	FW	ISR	Yarden Cohen (from (Israel) Hapoel Nazareth Illit)

Out: Note: Flags indicate national team as defined under FIFA eligibility rules; some limited exceptions apply. Players may hold more than one non-FIFA nationality.

No.	Pos.	Nation	Player
—	MF	ISR	Dela Yampolsky (To (Israel) Maccabi Haifa)
—	GK	BOL	Carlos Arias (To (Spain) Cordoba)
—	GK	ISR	Idan Baruch (To (Romania) Snagov)
—	FW	GEO	Gaga Chkhetiani (To (Israel) Hapoel Kfar Saba)
—	DF	ISR	Tal Ma'abi (To (Israel) Maccabi Petah Tikva)
—	MF	ISR	Snir Gueta (To (Israel) Maccabi Ironi Kiryat Malachi)
—	MF	ISR	Guy Evand (on loan to (Israel) Hapoel Kfar Saba)
—	MF	ISR	Ofir Amram (on loan to (Israel) Beitar Jerusalem)

=== Maccabi Petah Tikva ===
In: Note: Flags indicate national team as defined under FIFA eligibility rules; some limited exceptions apply. Players may hold more than one non-FIFA nationality.

No.	Pos.	Nation	Player
—	GK	ISR	Liran Strauber (from (Israel) Maccabi Tel Aviv)
—	MF	SVN	Nastja Ceh (from (Israel) Bnei Sakhnin)
—	MF	CRO	Mario Carevic (from (Belgium) Kortrijk)
—	MF	ISR	Zion Zemah (on loan from (Israel) Maccabi Tel Aviv)
—	MF	CMR	Justice Wamfor (from (Belgium) Beerschot)
—	FW	ISR	Victor Merey (on loan from (Israel) Hapoel Tel Aviv)

Out: Note: Flags indicate national team as defined under FIFA eligibility rules; some limited exceptions apply. Players may hold more than one non-FIFA nationality.

No.	Pos.	Nation	Player
—	FW	ISR	Omer Damari (to (Israel) Hapoel Tel Aviv)
—	DF	ISR	Eliran Danin (to (Israel) Hapoel Acco)
—	MF	SRB	Nebojša Marinković (to (Israel) Hapoel Acco)
—	GK	CRO	Ivan Mance (to (Croatia) NK Istra)
—	MF	ISR	Rubil Sarsur (to (Israel) Kfar Saba)
—	FW	ISR	Liron Diamant (to (Israel) Beitar Jerusalem)
—	MF	ISR	Soli Zemah (on loan to (Israel) Maccabi Jaffa)
—	MF	ISR	Shai David (on loan to (Israel) Hapoel Kfar Saba)
—	GK	ISR	Tzlil Hatuka (on loan to (Israel) Ahva Arraba)
—	FW	ISR	Rotem Shmuel (on loan to (Israel) Ahi Nazareth)
—	DF	ISR	Omar Gara (on loan to (Israel) Jatt Al-Ahli)
—	DF	ISR	Majd Younes (on loan to (Israel) Nazareth Illit)
—	MF	ISR	Michael Zandberg (Free agent)
—	DF	URU	Joe Bizera (Free agent)
—	DF	RUS	Murad Megamadov (Retired)

=== Maccabi Tel Aviv ===
In: Note: Flags indicate national team as defined under FIFA eligibility rules; some limited exceptions apply. Players may hold more than one non-FIFA nationality.

No.	Pos.	Nation	Player
—	MF	ISR	Eli Zizov (from (Portugal) Braga)
—	GK	ISR	Guy Haimov (loan return from (Israel) Kiryat Shmona)
—	MF	ISR	Tamir Cahlon (loan return from (Belgium) Charleroi)
—	MF	ISR	Rafi Dahan (from (Israel) Hapoel Petah Tikva)
—	FW	SEN	Pape Moussa Konaté (from (Senegal) ASC Toure Kunda de Mbour)
—	DF	CRO	Roberto Punčec (from (Croatia) Varaždin)

Out: Note: Flags indicate national team as defined under FIFA eligibility rules; some limited exceptions apply. Players may hold more than one non-FIFA nationality.

No.	Pos.	Nation	Player
—	DF	ISR	Amiran Shkalim (to (Israel) Rishon LeZion)
—	GK	ISR	Liran Strauber (to (Israel) Maccabi Petah Tikva)
—	DF	ISR	Lior Jan (to (Israel) Hapoel Haifa)
—	MF	ISR	Maor Buzaglo (to (Belgium) Standard Liège)
—	DF	ISR	Dor Malul (On Loan To (Belgium) Beerschot AC)
—	GK	ISR	Nisso Kapiloto (on loan to (Israel) Hapoel Acco)
—	MF	ISR	Zion Zemah (on loan to (Israel) Maccabi Petah Tikva)
—	DF	ISR	Eliran George (on loan to (Israel) Hapoel Haifa)
—	FW	ISR	Omri Ron (on loan to (Israel) Bnei Yehuda Tel Aviv)
—	FW	ISR	Matan Lutatti (on loan to (Israel) Beitar Shimshon)
—	FW	ISR	Yotam Penso (on loan to (Israel) Hapoel Herzliya)
—	GK	ISR	Mike Hen (on loan to (Israel) Hapoel Kfar Shalem)
—	MF	ISR	Maor Halabi (on loan to (Israel) Hakoah Ramat Gan)
—	DF	ISR	Ori Shitrit (to (Israel) Bnei Sakhnin)
—	DF	ISR	Ronny Gafney (Free agent)
