= List of 2010–11 Israeli football winter transfers =

Following is a List of 2010–11 Israeli football winter transfers, in the 2011 winter transfer window by each club, both in the Israeli Premier League and the second-tier Liga Leumit.

== Israeli Premier league ==
=== Beitar Jerusalem ===
In: Note: Flags indicate national team as defined under FIFA eligibility rules; some limited exceptions apply. Players may hold more than one non-FIFA nationality.

No.	Pos.	Nation	Player
—	MF	(Israel) ISR	Gal Levy (On loan from (Israel) Hakoah Ramat Gan)
—	MF	(Ivory Coast) CIV	Hervé Kage (From (Belgium) Sporting Charleroi)

Out: Note: Flags indicate national team as defined under FIFA eligibility rules; some limited exceptions apply. Players may hold more than one non-FIFA nationality.

No.	Pos.	Nation	Player
—	FW	(Ivory Coast) CIV	Serge Ayeli (to (Israel) Hapoel Ashkelon)
—	MF	(Argentina) ARG	Darío Fernández (To (Cyprus) Alki Larnaca)

=== Bnei Sakhnin ===
In: Note: Flags indicate national team as defined under FIFA eligibility rules; some limited exceptions apply. Players may hold more than one non-FIFA nationality.

No.	Pos.	Nation	Player
—	FW	(Bulgaria) BUL	Kostadin Hazurov (From (Bulgaria) Minyor Pernik)
—	DF	(Israel) ISR	Idan Weitzman (From (Israel) Hapoel Haifa)
—	FW	(Bulgaria) BUL	Daniel Mitev (Free Agent, last with Beroe Stara Zagora)
—	MF	(Bulgaria) BUL	Atanas Bornosuzov (Free Agent, last with FC Astra Ploieşti)

Out: Note: Flags indicate national team as defined under FIFA eligibility rules; some limited exceptions apply. Players may hold more than one non-FIFA nationality.

No.	Pos.	Nation	Player
—	FW	(Israel) ISR	Yaniv Luzon (To (Israel) Hapoel Petah Tikva)
—	GK	(Israel) ISR	Meir Cohen (To (Israel) Hapoel Ironi Rishon LeZion)
—	MF	(Israel) ISR	Emad Badarna (On loan to (Israel) Ahva Arraba F.C.)

=== Bnei Yehuda Tel Aviv ===
In: Note: Flags indicate national team as defined under FIFA eligibility rules; some limited exceptions apply. Players may hold more than one non-FIFA nationality.

No.	Pos.	Nation	Player

Out: Note: Flags indicate national team as defined under FIFA eligibility rules; some limited exceptions apply. Players may hold more than one non-FIFA nationality.

No.	Pos.	Nation	Player
—	MF	(Israel) ISR	Assi Baldout (On loan to (Israel) Hapoel Haifa)
—	FW	(Armenia) ARM	Yeghia Yavruyan (To (Israel) Hapoel Ashkelon)

=== F.C. Ashdod ===
In: Note: Flags indicate national team as defined under FIFA eligibility rules; some limited exceptions apply. Players may hold more than one non-FIFA nationality.

No.	Pos.	Nation	Player
—	MF	(Israel) ISR	Idan Srur (From (Israel) Hapoel Ramat Gan)
—	DF	(Israel) ISR	Nisso Kapiloto (On loan from (Israel) Maccabi Tel Aviv)

Out: Note: Flags indicate national team as defined under FIFA eligibility rules; some limited exceptions apply. Players may hold more than one non-FIFA nationality.

No.	Pos.	Nation	Player
—	MF	(Israel) ISR	Shay Revivo (To (Israel) Hapoel Tel Aviv)

=== Hapoel Acre ===
In: Note: Flags indicate national team as defined under FIFA eligibility rules; some limited exceptions apply. Players may hold more than one non-FIFA nationality.

No.	Pos.	Nation	Player
—	MF	(Israel) ISR	Sagiv Cohen (Free Agent, last with (Romania) ACSMU Poli Iaşi)

Out: Note: Flags indicate national team as defined under FIFA eligibility rules; some limited exceptions apply. Players may hold more than one non-FIFA nationality.

No.	Pos.	Nation	Player

=== Hapoel Ashkelon ===
In: Note: Flags indicate national team as defined under FIFA eligibility rules; some limited exceptions apply. Players may hold more than one non-FIFA nationality.

No.	Pos.	Nation	Player
—	FW	(Ivory Coast) CIV	Serge Ayeli (From (Israel) Beitar Jerusalem)}
—	FW	(Armenia) ARM	Yeghia Yavruyan (From (Israel) Bnei Yehuda)

Out: Note: Flags indicate national team as defined under FIFA eligibility rules; some limited exceptions apply. Players may hold more than one non-FIFA nationality.

No.	Pos.	Nation	Player
—	FW	(Israel) ISR	Eran Levy (To (Israel) Hapoel Be'er Sheva)

=== Hapoel Be'er Sheva ===
In: Note: Flags indicate national team as defined under FIFA eligibility rules; some limited exceptions apply. Players may hold more than one non-FIFA nationality.

No.	Pos.	Nation	Player
—	FW	(Israel) ISR	Eran Levy (From (Israel) Hapoel Ashkelon)

Out: Note: Flags indicate national team as defined under FIFA eligibility rules; some limited exceptions apply. Players may hold more than one non-FIFA nationality.

No.	Pos.	Nation	Player

=== Hapoel Haifa ===
In: Note: Flags indicate national team as defined under FIFA eligibility rules; some limited exceptions apply. Players may hold more than one non-FIFA nationality.

No.	Pos.	Nation	Player

Out: Note: Flags indicate national team as defined under FIFA eligibility rules; some limited exceptions apply. Players may hold more than one non-FIFA nationality.

No.	Pos.	Nation	Player
—	DF	(Israel) ISR	Idan Weitzman (To (Israel) Bnei Sakhnin)

=== Hapoel Petah Tikva ===
In: Note: Flags indicate national team as defined under FIFA eligibility rules; some limited exceptions apply. Players may hold more than one non-FIFA nationality.

No.	Pos.	Nation	Player
—	FW	(Israel) ISR	Yaniv Luzon (From (Israel) Bnei Sakhnin)
—	DF	(Israel) ISR	Yehuda Huta (On loan from (Israel) Hapoel Tel Aviv)
—	MF	(Israel) ISR	Roei Gordana (On loan from (Israel) Hapoel Tel Aviv)

Out: Note: Flags indicate national team as defined under FIFA eligibility rules; some limited exceptions apply. Players may hold more than one non-FIFA nationality.

No.	Pos.	Nation	Player

=== Hapoel Ramat Gan ===
In: Note: Flags indicate national team as defined under FIFA eligibility rules; some limited exceptions apply. Players may hold more than one non-FIFA nationality.

No.	Pos.	Nation	Player

Out: Note: Flags indicate national team as defined under FIFA eligibility rules; some limited exceptions apply. Players may hold more than one non-FIFA nationality.

No.	Pos.	Nation	Player
—	MF	(Israel) ISR	Idan Srur (To (Israel) F.C. Ashdod)

=== Hapoel Tel Aviv ===
In: Note: Flags indicate national team as defined under FIFA eligibility rules; some limited exceptions apply. Players may hold more than one non-FIFA nationality.

No.	Pos.	Nation	Player
—	MF	(Israel) ISR	Alroi Cohen (From (Israel) Ironi Kiryat Shmona)
—	DF	(Slovakia) SVK	Mário Pečalka (From (Slovakia) MŠK Žilina)
—	MF	(Israel) ISR	Shai Revivo (From (Israel) FC Ashdod)

Out: Note: Flags indicate national team as defined under FIFA eligibility rules; some limited exceptions apply. Players may hold more than one non-FIFA nationality.

No.	Pos.	Nation	Player
—	MF	(France) FRA	Romain Rocchi (To (France) Arles-Avignon)
—	DF	(Israel) ISR	Yehuda Huta (On loan to (Israel) Hapoel Petah Tikva)
—	MF	(Israel) ISR	Roei Gordana (On loan to (Israel) Hapoel Petah Tikva)
—	MF	(Ghana) GHA	William Owusu (On loan to (Israel) Sektzia Nes Tziona)

=== Ironi Kiryat Shmona ===
In: Note: Flags indicate national team as defined under FIFA eligibility rules; some limited exceptions apply. Players may hold more than one non-FIFA nationality.

No.	Pos.	Nation	Player
—	DF	(Israel) ISR	Eytan Tibi (From (Belgium) Charleroi)

Out: Note: Flags indicate national team as defined under FIFA eligibility rules; some limited exceptions apply. Players may hold more than one non-FIFA nationality.

No.	Pos.	Nation	Player
—	MF	(Israel) ISR	Alroi Cohen (To (Israel) Hapoel Tel Aviv)

=== Maccabi Haifa ===
In: Note: Flags indicate national team as defined under FIFA eligibility rules; some limited exceptions apply. Players may hold more than one non-FIFA nationality.

No.	Pos.	Nation	Player
—	DF	(Ukraine) UKR	Andriy Pylyavskyi (From (Ukraine) Nyva Vinnytsia)
—	MF	(Ghana) GHA	Seidu Yahaya (From (Greece) AEK Athens)

Out: Note: Flags indicate national team as defined under FIFA eligibility rules; some limited exceptions apply. Players may hold more than one non-FIFA nationality.

No.	Pos.	Nation	Player
—	MF	(Portugal) POR	Adrien Silva (Loan return to (Portugal) Sporting CP, later loaned to Académica de Coimbra)
—	DF	(Argentina) ARG	Ignacio Canuto (To Club Libertad)

=== Maccabi Netanya ===
In: Note: Flags indicate national team as defined under FIFA eligibility rules; some limited exceptions apply. Players may hold more than one non-FIFA nationality.

No.	Pos.	Nation	Player

Out: Note: Flags indicate national team as defined under FIFA eligibility rules; some limited exceptions apply. Players may hold more than one non-FIFA nationality.

No.	Pos.	Nation	Player

=== Maccabi Petah Tikva ===
In: Note: Flags indicate national team as defined under FIFA eligibility rules; some limited exceptions apply. Players may hold more than one non-FIFA nationality.

No.	Pos.	Nation	Player

Out: Note: Flags indicate national team as defined under FIFA eligibility rules; some limited exceptions apply. Players may hold more than one non-FIFA nationality.

No.	Pos.	Nation	Player

=== Maccabi Tel Aviv ===
In: Note: Flags indicate national team as defined under FIFA eligibility rules; some limited exceptions apply. Players may hold more than one non-FIFA nationality.

No.	Pos.	Nation	Player

Out: Note: Flags indicate national team as defined under FIFA eligibility rules; some limited exceptions apply. Players may hold more than one non-FIFA nationality.

No.	Pos.	Nation	Player
—	MF	(Israel) ISR	Zion Zemah (Loan To (Israel) Hapoel Ramat Gan)
—	DF	(Israel) ISR	Nisso Kapiloto (On loan to (Israel) F.C. Ashdod)

== Liga Leumit ==
=== Ahva Arraba ===
In: Note: Flags indicate national team as defined under FIFA eligibility rules; some limited exceptions apply. Players may hold more than one non-FIFA nationality.

No.	Pos.	Nation	Player
—	MF	(Israel) ISR	Emad Badarna (On loan from (Israel) Bnei Sakhnin)

Out: Note: Flags indicate national team as defined under FIFA eligibility rules; some limited exceptions apply. Players may hold more than one non-FIFA nationality.

No.	Pos.	Nation	Player

=== Beitar Shimshon Tel Aviv ===
In: Note: Flags indicate national team as defined under FIFA eligibility rules; some limited exceptions apply. Players may hold more than one non-FIFA nationality.

No.	Pos.	Nation	Player

Out: Note: Flags indicate national team as defined under FIFA eligibility rules; some limited exceptions apply. Players may hold more than one non-FIFA nationality.

No.	Pos.	Nation	Player

=== Hakoah Amidar Ramat Gan ===
In: Note: Flags indicate national team as defined under FIFA eligibility rules; some limited exceptions apply. Players may hold more than one non-FIFA nationality.

No.	Pos.	Nation	Player
—	MF	(Israel) ISR	Gal Levy (Loan return from (Israel) Hapoel Ramat Gan)

Out: Note: Flags indicate national team as defined under FIFA eligibility rules; some limited exceptions apply. Players may hold more than one non-FIFA nationality.

No.	Pos.	Nation	Player
—	MF	(Israel) ISR	Gal Levy (On loan to (Israel) Beitar Jerusalem)

=== Hapoel Bnei Lod ===
In: Note: Flags indicate national team as defined under FIFA eligibility rules; some limited exceptions apply. Players may hold more than one non-FIFA nationality.

No.	Pos.	Nation	Player

Out: Note: Flags indicate national team as defined under FIFA eligibility rules; some limited exceptions apply. Players may hold more than one non-FIFA nationality.

No.	Pos.	Nation	Player

=== Hapoel Herzliya ===
In: Note: Flags indicate national team as defined under FIFA eligibility rules; some limited exceptions apply. Players may hold more than one non-FIFA nationality.

No.	Pos.	Nation	Player

Out: Note: Flags indicate national team as defined under FIFA eligibility rules; some limited exceptions apply. Players may hold more than one non-FIFA nationality.

No.	Pos.	Nation	Player

=== Hapoel Kfar Saba ===
In: Note: Flags indicate national team as defined under FIFA eligibility rules; some limited exceptions apply. Players may hold more than one non-FIFA nationality.

No.	Pos.	Nation	Player

Out: Note: Flags indicate national team as defined under FIFA eligibility rules; some limited exceptions apply. Players may hold more than one non-FIFA nationality.

No.	Pos.	Nation	Player

=== Hapoel Nazareth Illit ===
In: Note: Flags indicate national team as defined under FIFA eligibility rules; some limited exceptions apply. Players may hold more than one non-FIFA nationality.

No.	Pos.	Nation	Player

Out: Note: Flags indicate national team as defined under FIFA eligibility rules; some limited exceptions apply. Players may hold more than one non-FIFA nationality.

No.	Pos.	Nation	Player

=== Hapoel Ra'anana ===
In: Note: Flags indicate national team as defined under FIFA eligibility rules; some limited exceptions apply. Players may hold more than one non-FIFA nationality.

No.	Pos.	Nation	Player

Out: Note: Flags indicate national team as defined under FIFA eligibility rules; some limited exceptions apply. Players may hold more than one non-FIFA nationality.

No.	Pos.	Nation	Player

=== Ironi Bat Yam ===
In: Note: Flags indicate national team as defined under FIFA eligibility rules; some limited exceptions apply. Players may hold more than one non-FIFA nationality.

No.	Pos.	Nation	Player

Out: Note: Flags indicate national team as defined under FIFA eligibility rules; some limited exceptions apply. Players may hold more than one non-FIFA nationality.

No.	Pos.	Nation	Player

=== Ironi Ramat HaSharon ===
In: Note: Flags indicate national team as defined under FIFA eligibility rules; some limited exceptions apply. Players may hold more than one non-FIFA nationality.

No.	Pos.	Nation	Player

Out: Note: Flags indicate national team as defined under FIFA eligibility rules; some limited exceptions apply. Players may hold more than one non-FIFA nationality.

No.	Pos.	Nation	Player

=== Hapoel Rishon LeZion ===
In: Note: Flags indicate national team as defined under FIFA eligibility rules; some limited exceptions apply. Players may hold more than one non-FIFA nationality.

No.	Pos.	Nation	Player
—	GK	(Israel) ISR	Meir Cohen (From (Israel) Bnei Sakhnin)

Out: Note: Flags indicate national team as defined under FIFA eligibility rules; some limited exceptions apply. Players may hold more than one non-FIFA nationality.

No.	Pos.	Nation	Player

=== Maccabi Ahi Nazareth ===
In: Note: Flags indicate national team as defined under FIFA eligibility rules; some limited exceptions apply. Players may hold more than one non-FIFA nationality.

No.	Pos.	Nation	Player

Out: Note: Flags indicate national team as defined under FIFA eligibility rules; some limited exceptions apply. Players may hold more than one non-FIFA nationality.

No.	Pos.	Nation	Player

=== Maccabi Be'er Sheva ===
In: Note: Flags indicate national team as defined under FIFA eligibility rules; some limited exceptions apply. Players may hold more than one non-FIFA nationality.

No.	Pos.	Nation	Player

Out: Note: Flags indicate national team as defined under FIFA eligibility rules; some limited exceptions apply. Players may hold more than one non-FIFA nationality.

No.	Pos.	Nation	Player

=== Maccabi Herzliya ===
In: Note: Flags indicate national team as defined under FIFA eligibility rules; some limited exceptions apply. Players may hold more than one non-FIFA nationality.

No.	Pos.	Nation	Player

Out: Note: Flags indicate national team as defined under FIFA eligibility rules; some limited exceptions apply. Players may hold more than one non-FIFA nationality.

No.	Pos.	Nation	Player

=== Maccabi Ironi Jatt ===
In: Note: Flags indicate national team as defined under FIFA eligibility rules; some limited exceptions apply. Players may hold more than one non-FIFA nationality.

No.	Pos.	Nation	Player

Out: Note: Flags indicate national team as defined under FIFA eligibility rules; some limited exceptions apply. Players may hold more than one non-FIFA nationality.

No.	Pos.	Nation	Player

=== Sektzia Nes Tziona ===
In: Note: Flags indicate national team as defined under FIFA eligibility rules; some limited exceptions apply. Players may hold more than one non-FIFA nationality.

No.	Pos.	Nation	Player
—	MF	(Ghana) GHA	William Owusu (On loan from (Israel) Hapoel Tel Aviv)

Out: Note: Flags indicate national team as defined under FIFA eligibility rules; some limited exceptions apply. Players may hold more than one non-FIFA nationality.

No.	Pos.	Nation	Player
—	MF	(Israel) ISR	Zion Zemah (Loan return to (Israel) Maccabi Tel Aviv)

== See also ==
- 2010–11 Toto Cup Al
- 2010–11 Toto Cup Leumit
- 2010–11 Israel State Cup
