= Eliran =

Eliran is a given name. Notable people with the name include:

- Eliran Asao (born 1985), Israeli footballer
- Eliran Atar (born 1987), Israeli footballer
- Eliran Avni, Israeli pianist
- Eliran Danin (born 1984), Israeli footballer
- Eliran Elkayam (born 1976), Israeli football player
- Eliran George (born 1992), Israeli footballer
- Eliran Guetta (born 1975), Israeli basketball player
- Eliran Hudeda (born 1981), Israeli footballer, manager at Ironi Tiberias
- Eliran Kantor (born 1984), Berlin-based Israeli artist and illustrator

== See also ==
- Ran Eliran (born 1934), known as "Israel's Ambassador of Song," is an Israeli singer
