= 2005–06 Toto Cup Leumit =

Toto Cup Leumit
- Season: 2005–06
- Champions: Hapoel Acre (1st title)

The 2005–06 Toto Cup Leumit was the 17th time the cup was being contested. The final was played at Ramat Gan Stadium on 31 January 2006.

The winners were Hapoel Acre, beating Hapoel Be'er Sheva on penalties in the final after 0–0 in 120 minutes.

== Group stage ==
=== Group A ===
Pos	Team	Pld	W	D	L	GF	GA	GD	Pts	HHA	HBS	MBS	HAS	HRL	IKS
1	Hapoel Haifa (A)	10	6	2	2	11	5	+6	20		1–3	2–0	1–0	1–0	0–0
2	Hapoel Be'er Sheva (A)	10	3	6	1	9	6	+3	15	2–0		0–0	0–0	1–1	0–0
3	Maccabi Be'er Sheva	10	3	4	3	7	9	−2	13	0–3	1–2		1–0	2–0	0–0
4	Hapoel Ashkelon	10	3	3	4	11	13	−2	12	0–0	2–0	1–1		0–4	3–2
5	Hapoel Rishon LeZion	10	2	4	4	8	10	−2	10	0–2	0–0	0–0	2–4		1–0
6	Ironi Kiryat Shmona	10	1	5	4	6	9	−3	8	0–1	1–1	1–2	2–1	0–0	

Source: walla.co.il (in Hebrew)
Rules for classification: 1st points; 2nd goal difference; 3rd matches won; 4th goals scored; 5th head-to-head; 6th decision match
(A) Advanced to the Semifinals

=== Group B ===
Pos	Team	Pld	W	D	L	GF	GA	GD	Pts	MHE	HAC	HJE	HAR	HRH	HRA
1	Maccabi Herzliya (A)	10	6	2	2	20	8	+12	20		4–0	0–2	0–3	3–1	1–1
2	Hapoel Acre (A)	10	6	1	3	9	12	−3	19	0–4		1–0	2–2	1–0	1–0
3	Hapoel Jerusalem	10	5	3	2	12	7	+5	18	0–1	1–0		0–0	1–1	2–0
4	Hakoah Amidar Ramat Gan	10	4	2	4	12	11	+1	14	0–4	0–1	0–1		3–2	3–0
5	Hapoel Ramat HaSharon	10	2	3	5	12	16	−4	9	1–3	0–1	2–2	1–0		1–1
6	Hapoel Ra'anana	10	0	3	7	6	17	−11	3	0–0	1–2	2–3	0–1	1–3	

Source: walla.co.il (in Hebrew)
Rules for classification: 1st points; 2nd goal difference; 3rd matches won; 4th goals scored; 5th head-to-head; 6th decision match
(A) Advanced to the Semifinals

=== Semi-finals ===
17 January 2006	Maccabi Herzliya	1–2 (a.e.t.)	Hapoel Acre	Ramat Gan
16:00	Isyaku 55'	Report (in Hebrew)	Hassan 57'; Schwartzman 105'	Stadium: Ramat Gan Stadium

17 January 2006	Hapoel Be'er Sheva	1–1 (a.e.t.) (3–1 p)	Hapoel Haifa	Ramat Gan
18:00	Ifrah 90+4'	Report (in Hebrew)	Lala 55'	Stadium: Ramat Gan Stadium

=== Final ===
31 January 2006
16:30

Hapoel Be'er Sheva	0–0 (a.e.t.)	Hapoel Acre
	Report
Penalties
Sagron (penalty scored); Ifrah (penalty scored); Chichian (penalty missed); Attia (penalty scored)	3–5	(penalty scored) Cohen; (penalty scored) Kojok; (penalty scored) Eliyahu; (penalty scored) Weitzman; (penalty scored) Gita

Ramat Gan Stadium, Ramat Gan

== See also ==
- Toto Cup
- 2005–06 Liga Leumit
- 2005–06 in Israeli football
