= Idan =

Idan or Edan may refer to:

== People ==
=== Given name ===
- Edan (musician) (born 1978), American alternative hip hop artist
- Edan Everly (born 1968), American guitarist, musician, singer songwriter
- Edan Gross (born 1978), American child actor
- Edan Milton Hughes (1935-2015), American art dealer and art collector
- Edan Leshem (born 1997), Israeli tennis player
- Edan Lui (born 1997), Hong Kong singer
- Idan Alterman (born 1971), Israeli television, film, and theater actor
- Idan Baruch (born 1990), Israeli-Romanian football goalkeeper
- Idan David (born 1987), Israeli footballer
- Idan Malichi (born 1979), Israeli footballer
- Idan Raichel (born 1977), Israeli singer-songwriter and musician
- Idan Roll (born 1984), an Israeli politician
- Idan Sade (born 1988), Israeli footballer
- Idan Schefler (born 1984), Israeli footballer
- Idan Shriki (born 1981), Israeli footballer
- Idan Shum (born 1976), Israeli footballer
- Idan Srur (born 1986), Israeli footballer
- Idan Tal (born 1975), Israeli footballer
- Idan Vered (born 1989), Israeli footballer
- Idan Weitzman (born 1985), Israeli footballer
- Idan Yaniv (born 1986), Israeli singer
- Idan Zalmanson (born 1995), Israeli basketball player
- Máedóc of Ferns (558-632), also referred to as Saint Edan

=== Surname ===
- Abdullah Al-Edan, Qatar football defender
- John Idan, American guitarist and vocalist
- Sarah Idan (born 1990), an Iraqi woman was a Miss Universe contestant and the target of people's death threats after she took pictures with Israeli contestants.

== Music ==
- The Idan Raichel Project, self-titled debut album by Idan Raichel.

== Places ==
- Edan Hills, South Australia, Australian suburb of the city of Mitcham
- Idan, Israel, a moshav in the Arava region of southern Israel.
- Idan HaNegev Industrial Park, industrial park southeast of Rahat, Israel
- St Edan's Cathedral, Irish cathedral

== Other uses ==
- Idan+, an Israeli digital terrestrial television provider
