= Caveda =

Caveda is a surname. Notable people with the surname include:

- David Caveda (born 1979), Ethiopian-born Israeli footballer, cousin of Ziv
- Ziv Caveda (born 1978), Ethiopian-born Israeli footballer
