= ASOR =

Asor or ASOR may refer to:

- Asor, one of the inhabited islands of Ulithi Atoll, in the Federated States of Micronesia
- Asor, musical instrument "of ten strings" mentioned in the Bible
- Maor Asor, Israeli footballer
- American Society of Overseas Research
- Applied Statistics and Operations Research
- Australian Society for Operations Research
