= Gavish =

Gavish is a surname. Notable people with the surname include:

- Oded Gavish (born 1989), Israeli former professional footballer
- Yeshayahu Gavish (1925–2024), Israeli army officer
