= Meir Cohen =

Meir Cohen may refer to:

- Meir Cohen (politician) (born 1955), Israeli legislator, member of the Knesset
- Meir Cohen (footballer) (born 1972), Israeli association football goalkeeper
- Meir Cohen-Avidov (1926–2015), Israeli legislator, member of the Knesset
- Mickey Cohen (given name Meyer) (1913–1976), Jewish-American gangster
