= Avner Dorman =

Israeli musician (born 1975)

- אבנר דורמן
- Born: 14 April 1975 (age 51); Tel Aviv, Israel
- Education: Juilliard School (D.M.A.); Buchmann-Mehta School of Music at Tel Aviv University (M.A.)
- Occupations: Composer; Conductor; Educator
- Awards: Israel's Prime-Minister's Award; ACUM Prize for Ellef Symphony; Israeli Cultural Ministry Prize; Azrieli Prize for Jewish Music
- Musical career
- Genre: Classical
- Instrument: Piano
- Label: Naxos

Avner Dorman (Hebrew: אבנר דורמן; born April 14, 1975, in Tel Aviv, Israel) is an Israeli-born composer, educator and conductor.

== Education ==
Dorman holds a doctorate in music composition from the Juilliard School, where he studied as a C.V. Starr fellow with John Corigliano. He completed his master's degree at the Buchmann-Mehta School of Music of Tel Aviv University (where he majored in music, musicology, and physics) studying with Josef Bardanashvili.

== Career ==
At age 25, Dorman became the youngest composer to win Israel's Prime-Minister's award. He has since been awarded the ACUM prize for his Ellef Symphony. Ma'ariv newspaper in Israel named Dorman "Composer of the Year" for 2002, and the performance of his song cycle "Boaz" received the Israeli Cultural Ministry Prize for best performance of Israeli music the same year. Dorman's "Variations Without a Theme", premiered by Zubin Mehta and the Israel Philharmonic Orchestra in November 2003 and won the 2004 Best Composition of the Year award from ACUM. This piece led to a commission from Zubin Mehta, PercaDu, and the Israel Philharmonic Orchestra for "Spices, Perfumes, Toxins!", a concerto for percussion duo and orchestra.

Orchestras that have performed Dorman's music include the Chicago Symphony Orchestra, New York Philharmonic Orchestra, the Los Angeles Philharmonic, San Francisco Symphony, the Munich Philharmonic Orchestra, the Israel Philharmonic Orchestra and the Vienna Radio Symphony Orchestra.

In 2006, Naxos Records released an album dedicated to Dorman's piano works with Eliran Avni at the piano. In 2010, Naxos Records released an album dedicated to Dorman's chamber orchestra concerti. Avi Avital's performance of Dorman's "Mandolin Concerto" on this recording was nominated for a 2010 Grammy Award in the category of Best Instrumental Soloist Performance with Orchestra.

Dorman's debut opera, Wahnfried, was named as a finalist for the 2018 International Opera Awards, in the category of "World Premiere". The work received its UK premiere at Longborough Festival Opera in 2025. Gramophone described it as “undoubtedly a provocative work, boldly confronting the darkest elements of Wagnerian mythology,” and “a stark reminder that past horrors continue to echo in the present.” The Times wrote that the opera “tackles big themes—art, nationalism, fascism, antisemitism, homophobia, politics and power—with a strong feel for balancing acerbic satire, absurdist theatre and harrowing history,” and called it “a timely mirror to the malevolent and racist ideologies that still exist today.” The Guardian noted the “irony in the opera’s title” and described the music as “multifaceted in its references—Shostakovich, Prokofiev, Wagner himself—incisive, with often brittle instrumentation, and dynamically paced by conductor Justin Brown.”

He was awarded the 2018 Azrieli Prize for Jewish Music for his violin concerto, Nigunim, originally written as a violin sonata for violinist Gil Shaham and pianist Orli Shaham. In 2022, Nigunim had its NYC premiere when performed at the Naumburg Orchestral Concerts, in the Naumburg Bandshell, Central Park, in the summer series. The concert was supported by the Azrieli Foundation.

Dorman is a professor of music theory and composition at the Sunderman Conservatory of Music at Gettysburg College. He served as music director of CityMusic Cleveland chamber orchestra from 2013 to 2019.

== Compositions ==
=== Opera ===
- Wahnfried (2016)
- Die Kinder des Sultans (2019)
- Kundry (2021)

=== Percussion concertos ===
- Spices, Perfumes, Toxins! (2006)
- Frozen in Time (2007)
- Eternal Rhythm (2018)
- In Flux (2024)

=== Orchestral works without soloists ===
- Chorale for Strings (1999)
- Ellef Symphony (2000)
- Variations Without A Theme (2003)
- Uriah (2008–9)
- Azerbaijani Dance (2010)
- (not) The Shadow (2010)
- Astrolatry (2011)
- After Brahms (2015)
- Siklòn (2015)
- A Most Sacred Oath (2021)
- The Fifth Element (2022)
- Tanyaderas (2023)

=== Large Wind Ensemble ===
- Ellef Symphony
- Spices, Perfumes, Toxins!
- A Most Sacred Oath (2021)

=== Works for narrator and orchestra ===
- Uzu and Muzu from Kakaruzu (2012)
- Princess Avigail and the Emotions Factory (2025)

=== Choral works (with or without orchestra) ===
- Psalm 67 (2004)
- Letters from Gettysburg (2013)
- Dialogues of Love (2014)
- The Seventy Names of Jerusalem (2015)

=== Violin concertos ===
- Violin Concerto no. 1 (2006)
- Violin Concerto no. 2 – "Nigunim" (2017)
- Violin Concerto no. 3 – "Still" (2019)

=== Piano concertos ===
- Piano Concerto in A (1995)
- Piano Concerto no.2 – "Lost Souls" (2009)
- Piano Concerto no.3 (2021)

=== Concertos for various instruments ===
- Piccolo Concerto (2001)
- Concerto Grosso (2003)
- Saxophone Concerto (2003)
- Mandolin Concerto (2006)
- Cello Concerto (2013)
- How to Love for Guitar and Strings (2019)
- Double Concerto for Violin, Cello, and Orchestra (2019)
- Concerto for Mandolin, Guitar, and Strings (2021)
- Concerto for Cello, Piano and Orchestra (2022)
- A Time to Mourn and a Time to Dance (Concerto for Two Violins and Strings) (2025)
- Inner Fire (2026)

=== Sonatas for violin and piano ===
- Sonata No.1 (2004)
- Sonata No.2 (2008)
- Sonata No.3 – "Nigunim" (2011)
- Sonata No.4 (2014)

=== Piano trios ===
- Tree-yO! (1996)
- Trio (2001)

=== String quartets ===
- String Quartet No.1 (2003)
- String Quartet No.2 (2004)
- Prayer for the Innocents (2009)

=== Other chamber pieces ===
- Udacrep Akubrad for Two Percussionists (2001)
- Boaz for Soprano and Chamber Ensemble (2002)
- Jerusalem Mix for Piano Quintet (2007)
- Memory Games for Violin and Piano (2011)
- The Fear of Men for Baritone voice and Piano (2006)
- Mantra for Voice and Chamber Ensemble (2013)
- Consumed for Percussion Ensemble (2014)
- Suite for Solo Saxophone (2015)
- How to Love for Guitar and String Quartet (2016)
- Variations on a Simple Theme for Harp Trio (2017)
- Four Marimbas (2017)
- For Solo Violin (2017)
- Sextet for Trumpet, Piano, and Strings (2020)
- Green Spaces (2024)
- Child’s Play for Vibraphone and Guitar (2024)
- Many Waters for Mandolin and Guitar (2024)
- Kedma for Saxophone Quartet (2024)
- Fantasia for Domra (2024)
- Vocalise for Alto Saxophone and Piano (2024)

=== Piano sonatas ===
- Sonata no.1 (1999)
- Sonata no.2 (2000)
- Sonata no.3 – "Dance Suite" (2005)
- Sonata no.4 – "Libi Bamizrach" (2011)
- Sonata no.5 (2018)
- Sonata no.6 (2020)

=== Other solo piano music ===
- Prelude No.1 (1992)
- Moments Musicaux (2003)
- Azerbaijani Dance (2005)
- Nocturne Insomniaque (2007)
- Karsilama for Two Pianos (2012)
- Three Etudes (2012)
- After Brahms (2014)
- For a Friend I Never Knew (2017)

=== Short opera ===
- Boundless (2018)
- Now (2018)

=== Music for film ===
- Wonderland (2013), directed by Avi Nesher
- Past Life (2016), directed by Avi Nesher
- Gan Kofim (2023), directed by Avi Nesher

=== Music for dance ===
- Ben (1997)
- Accord/Discord (1999)
- Falafel (2001)
- Impact (2006)

=== Pedagogical Works for Strings Orchestra ===
- Dragonfly's Journey (2023)
- Miriam Danced by the Red Sea (2025)
