= Smadja =

Smadja is a surname, with French, Tunisian and Jewish origins. Notable people with the surname include:

- Brigitte Smadja (1955–2023), Tunisian-born French author
- Kev Adams (Kevin Smadja; born 1991), French humorist and actor
- Oren Smadja (born 1970), Israeli judoka
- Shaul Smadja (born 1972), Israeli footballer
