= Asao =

Asao is both a Japanese surname and a masculine Japanese given name. Notable people with the name include:

Surname:

- Eliran Asao (born 1985), footballer
- Keiichiro Asao (浅尾 慶一郎; born 1964), politician
- Miwa Asao (浅尾 美和; born 1986), volleyballer
- Takuya Asao (浅尾 拓也; born 1984), baseball player

Given name:

- Asao Hirano (平野 朝雄; born 1926), Japanese physician, academic and medical researcher
- Asao Sano (佐野 浅夫; 1925–2022), Japanese actor
- Asao Koike (小池 朝雄; 1931–1985), Japanese actor

== See also ==
- Asao (codec)
- Asao-ku, Kawasaki
