= Raphael Maltinsky =

Brazilian-Israeli footballer

Raphael Maltinsky רפאל מלטינסקי
Personal information
- Full name: Rafhael Maltinsky רפאל מלטינסקי
- Date of birth: 18 December 1987 (age 38)
- Place of birth: Brazil
- Position: Midfielder

Youth career
- 1997–2007: Hapoel Petah Tikva

Senior career*
| Years | Team | Apps | (Gls) |
| 2007–2013 | Hapoel Petah Tikva | 3 | (0) |
| 2010 | → Ironi Amishav Petah Tikva (loan) | 4 | (0) |
| 2010 | → Hapoel Mahane Yehuda (loan) | 9 | (5) |
| 2011 | → Maccabi Ironi Kfar Yona (loan) | 6 | (2) |
- * Club domestic league appearances and goals as of 18:20, 18 January 2010 (UTC)

Raphael Maltinsky (Hebrew: רפאל מלטינסקי; born 18 December 1987) is a Brazilian-Israeli professional association football player currently without a club.

== Biography ==
=== Arrival to Israel ===
Maltinsky arrived in Israel for the second time in order to sign with Hapoel Petah Tikva while also holding an offer from Brazilian club Vitória. Originally, he was wanted by Maccabi Netanya but no deal could be brokered and he returned to his native Brazil.

During a training session on 6 October 2009, Maltinsky got into a heated war of words with Kobi Dajani. After some physical play, Dajani walked over to Maltinsky and headbutted him in the face requiring Maltinsky to be taken to a hospital where he had four stitches put in. Dajani apologized the following day to Maltinsky but both were not allowed back in to train with the club without going before a tribunal.

== Statistics ==
| Club performance | | | League | | Cup | | League Cup | | Continental | | Total | |
| Season | Club | League | Apps | Goals | Apps | Goals | Apps | Goals | Apps | Goals | Apps | Goals |
| Israel | | | League | | Israel State Cup | | Toto Cup | | Europe | | Total | |
|---|---|---|---|---|---|---|---|---|---|---|---|---|
| 2005–2006 | Hapoel Petah Tikva | Liga Al | 1 | 0 | 0 | 0 | 0 | 0 | 0 | 0 | 1 | 0 |
| 2007–08 | Hapoel Petah Tikva | Liga Leumit | 2 | 0 | 0 | 0 | 1 | 0 | 0 | 0 | 3 | 0 |
| 2009 | Hapoel Petah Tikva | Liga Al | 0 | 0 | 0 | 0 | 1 | 0 | 0 | 0 | 1 | 0 |
| 2009-10 | Maccabi Ironi Amishav Petah Tikva | Liga Alef | 4 | 0 | 0 | 0 | 0 | 0 | 0 | 0 | 4 | 0 |
| Total | Israel | | | | | | | | | | | |
| Career total | | | | | | | | | | | | |
