= F.C. Daburiyya =

Israeli football club

- Full name: Mo'adon Sport Daburiyya Osama מועדון ספורט דבוריה אוסמה
- Founded: 2008
- Dissolved: 2021
- Ground: Daburiyya
- Manager: Meir Cohen
- 2020–21: Liga Alef North (Group B), 9th
Home colours	Away colours

F.C. Daburiyya (Hebrew: מועדון ספורט דבוריה אוסמה דבוריה), also known as Hapoel Daburiyya (Hebrew: הפועל דבוריה, Arabic: هبوعيل دبورية)) is an Israeli football club based in Daburiyya. The club is currently in Liga Bet North B division.

== History ==
The club was founded in 2008 as a replacement for the Hapoel Daburiyya club, which operated from the mid-1960s and folded in 2006. The new club joined Liga Gimel Jerzreel division, which it won in 2010–11, promoting to Liga Bet North B division, where they played ever since.

== Honours ==
=== League ===
Honour	No.	Years
Fifth tier	3	1985–86^{1}, 1986–87^{1}, 2010–11

^{1}As Hapoel Daburiyya

=== Cup competitions ===
Honour	No.	Years
Liga Gimel divisional State Cup	1	2010–11
