= Hamudi Brick =

Israeli footballer

Mohamad "Hamoudi" Brik مُحَمَّد "خَمُّودِيّ" برك
Personal information
- Full name: Mohamad Brik
- Date of birth: March 19, 1978 (age 48)
- Place of birth: Israel
- Position: Defender

Team information
- Current team: F.C. Kafr Yasif

Youth career
- Maccabi Haifa

Senior career*
Years	Team	Apps	(Gls)
–2003	Hapoel Ihud Bnei Sumei		
2003–2004	Maccabi Kafr Kanna		
2004–2006	Maccabi Netanya	41	(0)
2006–2007	Bnei Sakhnin	29	(2)
2007–2008	Hapoel Acre	43	(1)
2008–2011	Ahva Arraba	82	(3)
2017	F.C. Julis	6	(2)
2019–2020	Maccabi Bnei Abu Snan	15	(2)
2020–2021	F.C. Kafr Yasif	6	(2)
2021	Maccabi Bnei Abu Snan	0	(0)
- * Club domestic league appearances and goals

Mohamad "Hamoudi" Brik (Arabic: مُحَمَّد "خَمُّودِيّ" برك, Hebrew: מוחמד "חמודי" בריק; born March 19, 1978) is an Israeli former footballer.
