= Amiran Shkalim =

Israeli footballer

Personal information
- Full name: Amiran Shkalim
- Date of birth: March 22, 1988 (age 38)
- Place of birth: Ramat HaSharon, Israel
- Height: 1.78 m (5 ft 10 in)
- Position: Left back

Youth career
- Maccabi Tel Aviv

Senior career*
Years	Team	Apps	(Gls)
2008–2013	Maccabi Tel Aviv	0	(0)
2008–2009	→ Hapoel Kfar Saba (loan)	23	(2)
2009–2011	→ Hapoel Petah Tikva (loan)	19	(0)
2011–2012	→ Hapoel Rishon LeZion (loan)	32	(1)
2012–2013	→ Hapoel Petah Tikva (loan)	33	(3)
2013–2014	F.C. Ashdod	11	(1)
2014–2016	Hapoel Petah Tikva	37	(0)
2016–2017	Hapoel Ramat HaSharon	35	(2)
2017–2018	Hapoel Petah Tikva	33	(2)
2018–2019	Hapoel Tel Aviv	4	(0)
- * Club domestic league appearances and goals as of 1 June 2019

Amiran Shkalim (Hebrew: עמירן שקלים; born 23 March 1988) is an Israeli retired footballer.
