= Kobi Dajani =

Israeli footballer

Kobi Dajani קובי דג'אני
Personal information
- Full name: Ya'akov Dajani
- Date of birth: 5 November 1984 (age 41)
- Place of birth: Jaffa, Tel Aviv, Israel
- Height: 1.74 m (5 ft 8 1/2 in)
- Position: Defensive midfielder

Team information
- Current team: Hapoel Marmorek

Youth career
- Gadna Tel Aviv Yehuda

Senior career*
Years	Team	Apps	(Gls)
2002–2007	Bnei Yehuda	98	(2)
2007–2009	F.C. Ashdod	44	(0)
2009–2010	Hapoel Petah Tikva	13	(0)
2010	Hapoel Ashkelon	16	(1)
2010–2013	Maccabi Netanya	93	(8)
2013–2014	Hapoel Be'er Sheva	19	(0)
2014–2015	Hapoel Haifa	23	(0)
2015–2016	F.C. Ashdod	5	(0)
2016	Hapoel Marmorek	0	(0)

International career
2002–2003	Israel U19	8	(0)
2003–2007	Israel U21	15	(0)
2010	Israel	1	(0)
- * Club domestic league appearances and goals

Ya'akov "Kobi" Dajani (Hebrew: יעקב "קובי" דג'אני; born 5 November 1984) is an Israeli former professional association football player and Israel U21 international.

== Biography ==
=== Early life ===
Kobi Dajani started playing football in the youth ranks of Gadna Tel Aviv Yehuda in Tel Aviv.

=== Playing career ===
==== Domestic ====
Dajani made his first team debut, as a substitute, for Bnei Yehuda in a Premier League match against city rivals, Hapoel on 19 October 2002.

During a training session on 6 October 2009, Dajani got into a heated war of words with youth player, Raphael Maltinsky. After some physical play, Dajani walked over to Maltinsky and headbutted him in the face requiring Maltinsky to be taken to a hospital where he had four stitches put in. Dajani apologized that night to Maltinsky over the phone. The following day, both Dajani and Maltinsky came to training but both were not allowed to train with the club without going before a tribunal.

In June 2010 Dajani signed a 1-year deal with Maccabi Netanya. His debut season with the club proved to be his finest and he is considered by many fans as the MVP of Netanya in the 2010–11 season. In June 2011 he signed a new 4-years contract with Netanya worth $480,000 which means a 60% upgrade to his yearly salary.

==== International ====
Dajani was part of the Israel national under-21 football team that qualified for the 2007 UEFA European Under-21 Football Championship, but was not named to the final squad.

On 17 November 2010 he made his debut for the senior side when Israel played against Iceland.

== Statistics ==
As to 1 June 2014

Club performance			League		Cup		League Cup		Continental		Total	
Season	Club	League	Apps	Goals	Apps	Goals	Apps	Goals	Apps	Goals	Apps	Goals
Israel			League		Israel State Cup		Toto Cup		Europe		Total	
2002–2003	Bnei Yehuda	Ligat ha'Al	7	1	2	0	4	0	0	0	13	1
2003–2004	Bnei Yehuda	Ligat ha'Al	16	1	1	0	5	0	0	0	22	1
2004–2005	Bnei Yehuda	Ligat ha'Al	28	0	3	1	6	1	0	0	37	2
2005–2006	Bnei Yehuda	Ligat ha'Al	23	0	0	0	7	0	0	0	30	0
2006–2007	Bnei Yehuda	Ligat ha'Al	23	0	0	0	6	0	0	0	29	0
2007–2008	F.C. Ashdod	Ligat ha'Al	24	0	1	0	3	0	0	0	28	0
2008–2009	F.C. Ashdod	Ligat ha'Al	20	0	2	0	8	0	0	0	30	0
2009–2010	Hapoel Petah Tikva	Ligat ha'Al	5	0	0	0	3	0	0	0	8	0
2009–2010	Hapoel Ashkelon	Liga Leumit	16	1	2	0	0	0	0	0	18	1
2010–2011	Maccabi Netanya	Ligat ha'Al	32	3	4	0	7	0	0	0	43	3
2011–2012	Maccabi Netanya	Ligat ha'Al	35	2	3	0	3	0	0	0	42	2
2012–2013	Maccabi Netanya	Ligat ha'Al	26	3	1	0	0	0	0	0	26	2
2013–2014	Hapoel Be'er Sheva	Ligat ha'Al	19	0	2	0	0	0	0	0	21	0
2014–2015	Hapoel Haifa	Ligat ha'Al	1	0	0	0	0	0	0	0	1	0
Total	Israel		271	11	21	1	54	1	0	0	350	13
Career total			271	11	21	1	54	1	0	0	350	13

== Honours ==
=== Team ===
- Liga Leumit:
  - Runner-up (1): 2009–10

=== Individual ===
- Israeli Premier League 2010–11 Surprise of the Season
