= Nil Abarbanel =

Israeli footballer

Nil Abarbanel ניל אברבאנל
Personal information
- Full name: Nil Abarbanel
- Date of birth: June 19, 1987 (age 39)
- Place of birth: Tel Aviv, Israel
- Height: 1.93 m (6 ft 4 in)
- Position: Goalkeeper

Youth career
- Hapoel Tel Aviv

Senior career*
Years	Team	Apps	(Gls)
2006–2010	Hapoel Tel Aviv	10	(0)
2007–2008	→ Bnei Yehuda Tel Aviv (loan)	6	(0)
2008	→ Hapoel Bnei Lod (loan)	7	(0)
2008–2009	→ Hakoah Amidar Ramat Gan (loan)	17	(0)
2010–2011	Hapoel Ra'anana	57	(0)
2012–2013	Hapoel Rishon LeZion	16	(0)
2013–2014	Maccabi Petah Tikva	24	(0)
2014–2015	Maccabi Kiryat Gat	34	(0)
2015–2016	Maccabi Yavne	26	(0)
2016–2017	Hapoel Jerusalem	27	(0)
2017–2019	F.C. Holon Yermiyahu	43	(0)
- * Club domestic league appearances and goals

Nil Abarbanel (Hebrew: ניל אברבאנל; born 19 June 1987) is a former Israeli footballer.
