= Idan Schefler =

Israeli footballer

Idan Schefler עידן שפלר
Personal information
- Date of birth: January 12, 1984 (age 42)
- Place of birth: Ramat Gan, Israel
- Height: 1.75 m (5 ft 9 in)
- Position: Defender

Youth career
- Hapoel Ramat Gan

Senior career*
Years	Team	Apps	(Gls)
2003–2006	Hapoel Ramat Gan	56	(0)
2006–2008	Boston College	12	(0)
2009–2013	Hapoel Kiryat Ono	50	(1)
2017	Shikun Vatikim Ramat Gan	4	(0)
- * Club domestic league appearances and goals

Idan Schefler (Hebrew: עידן שפלר; born January 1, 1984) is a retired Israeli footballer. Considered one of Ramat Gan's up and coming talents, he was nearly sold before the 2006–2007 season to national powerhouse, Beitar Jerusalem, but failed to impress during his trial. His trial period started at the club's training grounds and he was even brought to the club's preseason camp in Arnhem, Netherlands.
