= Ziv Caveda =

Ethiopian-born Israeli footballer

Ziv Caveda זיו כבדה
Personal information
- Date of birth: December 10, 1978 (age 47)
- Place of birth: Ethiopia
- Position: Midfielder

Team information
- Current team: Hapoel Tzafririm Holon

Youth career
- Hapoel Tzafririm Holon

Senior career*
Years	Team	Apps	(Gls)
1995–1998	Hapoel Tzafririm Holon	24	(0)
1999–2000	Hapoel Tel Aviv	4	(0)
2000–2001	Tzafririm Holon	37	(3)
2001–2002	Beitar Jerusalem	4	(0)
2003–2004	Hapoel Ramat Gan		
2004–2005	Hapoel Tzafririm Holon		
2006–2007	Hapoel Ashkelon	17	(0)
2007–2008	Hapoel Haifa	48	(3)
2008–2009	Hapoel Be'er Sheva	31	(2)
2009–2010	Sektzia Ness Ziona	28	(6)
2010–2011	Ironi Nir Ramat HaSharon	29	(2)
2011–2012	Maccabi Ahi Nazareth	33	(2)
2012–2014	Ironi Bat Yam	38	(2)
2014–2017	Bnei Yeechalal Rehovot	47	(5)
2017–2019	Hapoel Tzafririm Holon	23	(4)

International career
1998	Israel U21	1	(0)
- * Club domestic league appearances and goals

Ziv Caveda (Hebrew: זיו כבדה; born December 10, 1978) is a former footballer. Born in Ethiopia, he represented Israel at youth level.

== Career ==
After not seeing much time at Hapoel Tel Aviv, Caveda transferred to Tzafririm Holon where he was an instant starter. His morale was dealt a lethal blow when he was taunted by Maccabi Netanya's Itzik Zohar in a league match.

Ziv younger cousin David is also a footballer, they played together in Tzafririm Holon.

== Honours ==
- Toto Cup (Leumit):
  - Winner (1): 2010
