= Rafi Dahan =

Israeli footballer

Rafi Dahan רפי דהן
Personal information
- Full name: Rafael Dahan
- Date of birth: September 28, 1989 (age 37)
- Place of birth: Or Akiva, Israel
- Height: 1.69 m (5 ft 7 in)
- Position: Defensive midfielder

Youth career
- Maccabi Haifa F.C.
- Beitar Nes Tubruk

Senior career*
Years	Team	Apps	(Gls)
2009–2011	Hapoel Petah Tikva	41	(3)
2011–2015	Maccabi Tel Aviv	30	(0)
2013–2015	← Bnei Yehuda Tel Aviv (loan)	14	(1)
Total		104	(4)
- * Club domestic league appearances and goals

Refael "Rafi" Dahan (Hebrew: רפי דהן; born 28 September 1989) is a former Israeli footballer who last played for Bnei Yehuda Tel Aviv as a defensive midfielder.

== Early life ==
Dahan was born in Or Akiva, Israel, to a Jewish family.

== Career ==
Dahan grew up in the Beitar Nes Tubruk youth academy. In 2009, Hapoel Petah Tikva signed Dahan and by his second season with the club, Dahan had established himself as a first team player. In 2011, he signed with Maccabi Tel Aviv.

In March 2014, Maccabi Haifa F.C.'s Rubén Rayos committed a brutal tackle which resulted in an anterior cruciate ligament injury, forcing Dahan out for the remainder of the season; Rubén Rayos received a straight red card for his action.

After spending the next 12 months in recovery, Dahan was informed by his medical staff that his injury will not fully heal, forcing him to retire at age 25.
