= Hanan Fadida =

Israeli footballer

Hanan Fadida חנן פדידה
Personal information
- Date of birth: 1 December 1981 (age 44)
- Place of birth: Ashdod, Israel
- Height: 1.76 m (5 ft 9 1/2 in)
- Position: Forward

Youth career
- Maccabi Ironi Ashdod

Senior career*
Years	Team	Apps	(Gls)
1998–1999	Maccabi Ironi Ashdod	17	(1)
1999–2005	F.C. Ashdod	113	(15)
2003	→ Levski Sofia (loan)	0	(0)
2003–2004	→ Beitar Jerusalem (loan)	17	(2)
2004–2005	→ Ironi Kiryat Shmona (loan)		
2005	→ Hapoel Jerusalem (loan)		
2005–2010	Hapoel Be'er Sheva		
2010–2011	Hapoel Ashkelon	11	(1)
2011	Hapoel Kfar Saba	14	(0)
2011–2012	Maccabi Kiryat Malakhi	20	(10)
2012–2015	Hapoel Marmorek	66	(12)
2015	Hapoel Azor	3	(0)
2015–2016	Hapoel Ashdod	10	(6)
2016	F.C. Be'er Sheva	14	(9)

Managerial career
- 2016–2017: F.C. Bnei Jaffa Ortodoxim
- 2018: Hapoel Bnei Ashdod
- 2019–2020: Hapoel Gedera
- * Club domestic league appearances and goals

Hanan Fadida (Hebrew: חנן פדידה; born 1 December 1981) is a retired Israeli football striker.
