= Oz Ifrah =

Israeli footballer

Personal information
- Full name: Oz Ifrah
- Date of birth: 10 December 1982 (age 43)
- Place of birth: Beersheba, Israel
- Position: Center-back

Team information
- Current team: Tommy Tel Aviv
- Number: 47

Senior career*
Years	Team	Apps	(Gls)
2001–2007	Hapoel Be'er Sheva		
2007	Maccabi Tel Aviv	5	(0)
2008–2009	Torpedo Moscow	14	(0)
2009–2011	Maccabi Herzliya	75	(1)
2011–2013	Hapoel Ramat Gan	46	(1)
2013–2014	Hapoel Ashkelon	35	(0)
2014–2015	Hapoel Ramat Gan	35	(0)
2015–2016	Hapoel Herzliya	21	(0)
2016–2017	Hapoel Marmorek	28	(1)
2017–2018	Maccabi Yavne	31	(0)
2018–2019	F.C. Ironi Or Yehuda	30	(0)
2019	Maccabi Sha'arayim	9	(0)
2019–2021	Hapoel Kiryat Ono	41	(1)
2021–2022	Hapoel Qalansawe	17	(0)
2022–2025	Hapoel Lod	45	(1)
2023	→ Hakoah Ramat Gan	3	(0)
2025–	Tommy Tel Aviv	6	(0)

International career
2003	Israel U21	5	(0)
- * Club domestic league appearances and goals as of 1 June 2024

Oz Ifrah (Hebrew: עוז יפרח; born 10 December 1982) is an Israeli footballer currently playing for Maccabi Sh'aarayim.

== Honours ==
- Israel State Cup (1):
  - 2013
