= Adir Tubul =

Israeli footballer

Adir Tubul אדיר טובול
Personal information
- Full name: Adir Tubul
- Date of birth: June 3, 1979 (age 47)
- Place of birth: Ashdod, Israel
- Position: Left back

Youth career
- Maccabi Ironi Ashdod

Senior career*
Years	Team	Apps	(Gls)
1998–1999	Maccabi Ironi Ashdod	6	(0)
1999–2013	F.C. Ashdod	250	(2)
2010–2011	→ Hapoel Ashkelon (loan)	25	(1)
2013	Bnei Sakhnin	11	(0)
2013–2014	Maccabi Netanya	18	(1)
2014–2015	Maccabi Yavne	28	(1)
2015–2017	F.C. Ashdod	21	(0)
- * Club domestic league appearances and goals

Adir Tubul (Hebrew: אדיר טובול; born 3 June 1979) is a retired Israeli footballer.

== Career ==
Tubul began playing football with Maccabi Ironi Ashdod F.C.'s youth teams. By age 18, he joined the senior side, and would play professionally in Israel with Hapoel Ashkelon F.C., Bnei Sakhnin F.C., Maccabi Netanya F.C., Maccabi Yavne F.C. and F.C. Ashdod.

After he retired from playing football, Tubul became a coach for his former club Ashdod.

== Honours ==
- Toto Cup:
  - Runner-up (4): 2001–02, 2004–05, 2005–06, 2008–09
- Liga Leumit
  - Winner (1): 2013-14
- Israel State Cup
  - Runner-up (1): 2014
