= Lior Levi =

Israeli footballer

Lior Levi ליאור לוי
Personal information
- Full name: Lior Levi
- Date of birth: 26 October 1987 (age 39)
- Place of birth: Kfar Saba, Israel
- Height: 1.76 m (5 ft 9 1/2 in)
- Position: Full back

Team information
- Current team: Hapoel Hod HaSharon
- Number: 12

Youth career
- Hapoel Kfar Saba

Senior career*
Years	Team	Apps	(Gls)
2007–2011	Hapoel Kfar Saba	26	(1)
2007	→ Hapoel Ramat Gan	6	(0)
2007–2008	→ Beitar Kfar Saba	20	(4)
2008–2010	→ Hapoel Acre	31	(0)
2011–2013	Ironi Kiryat Shmona	38	(0)
2013–2015	Hapoel Tel Aviv	48	(0)
2015–2016	Hapoel Acre	13	(0)
2016	Hapoel Ra'anana	20	(0)
2016–2017	Hapoel Kfar Saba	0	(0)
2017–2018	Hapoel Ramat Gan	24	(0)
2018–2019	Hapoel Rishon LeZion	15	(0)
2019	Hapoel Azor	10	(0)
2019	Hapoel Kfar Shalem	11	(0)
2019–2020	Hapoel Hod HaSharon	3	(0)
2020–2021	Maccabi Sha'arayim	15	(0)
- * Club domestic league appearances and goals

Lior Levi (Hebrew: ליאור לוי; born 26 October 1987) is an Israeli footballer who currently plays for Hapoel Hod HaSharon in Liga Alef.
