= Eliran Avni =

Israeli musician

Eliran Avni (Hebrew: אלירן אבני) is an Israeli pianist.

Eliran Avni is the creative director of Shuffle Concert, a musical group which allows members of the audience to select during a concert which pieces from the repertoire of the group will be performed.
