= Yaniv Chichian =

Israeli footballer

Yaniv Chichian יניב צ'יצ'יאן
Personal information
- Full name: Yaniv Chichian
- Date of birth: 15 August 1979 (age 47)
- Place of birth: Israel
- Position: Defender

Youth career
- Hapoel Kfar Saba

Senior career*
Years	Team	Apps	(Gls)
1998–2003	Hapoel Kfar Saba		
1999–2000	Bnei Yehuda (loan)	16	(0)
2003–2004	F.C. Ashdod		
2004–2005	Maccabi Netanya	25	(0)
2005–2006	Hapoel Be'er Sheva		
2006–2007	Hapoel Nazareth Illit	24	(0)
2007–2008	Hapoel Haifa	26	(0)
2008–2010	Hapoel Acre	28	(0)
2010	Ironi Nir Ramat HaSharon	9	(0)
2010–2011	Hapoel Kfar Saba	16	(2)
- * Club domestic league appearances and goals

Yaniv Chichian (Hebrew: יניב צ'יצ'יאן; born 15 August 1979) is a former Israeli footballer currently playing his trade at Hapoel Kfar Saba.

== Honours ==
- Liga Leumit (1):
  - 2001-02
- Toto Cup (Leumit) (1):
  - 2004-05
