= Assi Baldout =

Israeli footballer

Assi Baldout אסי בלדוט
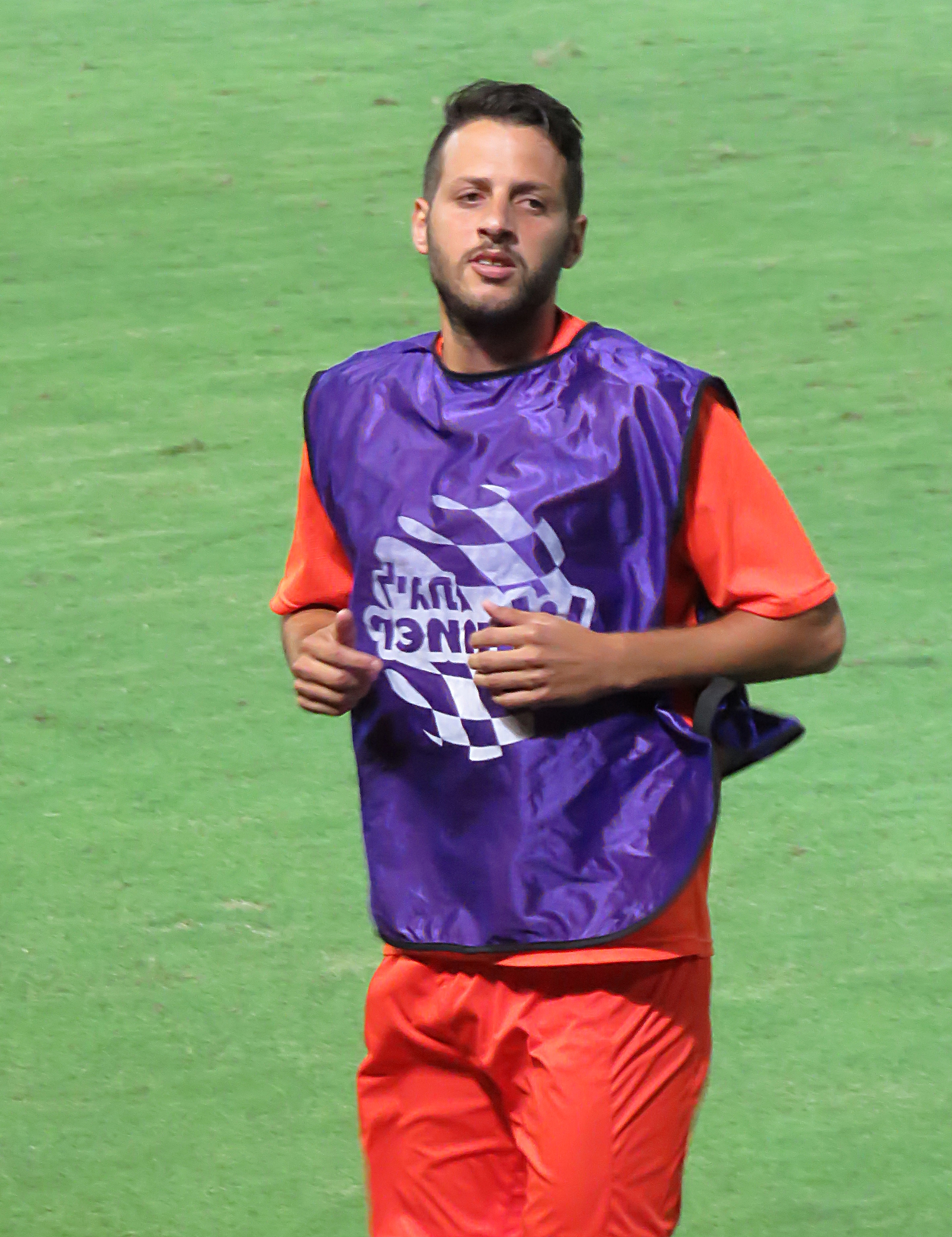
- Baldout warming up for Bnei Yehuda in 2015

Personal information
- Full name: Assi Baldout
- Date of birth: October 21, 1981 (age 45)
- Place of birth: Tel Aviv, Israel
- Height: 1.86 m (6 ft 1 in)
- Position: Right midfielder

Team information
- Current team: Bnei Yehuda

Youth career
- 1990–1998: Bnei Yehuda

Senior career*
Years	Team	Apps	(Gls)
1998–2011	Bnei Yehuda	296	(37)
2011	Hapoel Haifa	13	(2)
2011–2012	Hapoel Rishon LeZion	27	(9)
2012–2013	Ironi Ramat HaSharon	21	(4)
2013–2014	Hapoel Ra'anana	27	(5)
2014–2016	Bnei Yehuda	60	(3)
2016–2017	Hapoel Kfar Shalem	7	(1)

International career
2001–2003	Israel U21	4	(0)

Managerial career
- 2016–: Bnei Yehuda (assistant manager)
- * Club domestic league appearances and goals

Assi Baldout (Hebrew: אסי בלדוט) is a former Israeli footballer who now works as the assistant manager of Bnei Yehuda.

== Honours ==
- Liga Leumit:
  - Winner (1): 2014–15
  - Runner-up (1): 2001–02
- Israel State Cup:
  - Runner-up (1): 2006
