= Maor Asor =

Israeli footballer

Maor Asor מאור עשור
Personal information
- Full name: Maor Asor
- Date of birth: August 25, 1988 (age 38)
- Place of birth: Bat Yam, Israel
- Position: Attacking midfielder

Team information
- Current team: Maccabi Sha'arayim

Youth career
- Hapoel Tel Aviv

Senior career*
Years	Team	Apps	(Gls)
2007–2012	Hapoel Tel Aviv	0	(0)
2008–2010	→ Maccabi Ironi Bat Yam (loan)	62	(17)
2010–2011	→ Maccabi Netanya (loan)	32	(2)
2011–2012	→ Sektzia Ness Ziona (loan)	15	(4)
2012	Hapoel Ashkelon	13	(5)
2012–2014	Hapoel Rishon LeZion	30	(4)
2014–2015	Maccabi Kabilio Jaffa	16	(5)
2015–2016	Hakoah Amiadr Ramat Gan	15	(0)
2016	Sektzia Ness Ziona	12	(0)
2016–2017	Bnei Jaffa	4	(9)
2017	Hakoah Amidar Ramat Gan	20	(6)
2017–2018	F.C. Holon Yermiyahu	19	(4)
2018	Hapoel Azor	6	(1)
2018–2019	Hapoel Bik'at HaYarden	7	(1)
2019	Hapoel Mahane Yehuda	15	(7)
2019–2024	F.C. Holon Yermiyahu	117	(30)
2021	→ Shimshon Tel Aviv (loan)	9	(1)
2024–	Maccabi Sha'arayim	12	(1)
- * Club domestic league appearances and goals as of 1 December 2024

Maor Asor (Hebrew: מאור עשור; born 25 August 1988) is an Israeli footballer, currently playing for Maccabi Sha'arayim F.C..
