= Idan Baruch =

Israeli-Romanian footballer

Personal information
- Full name: Idan Baruch
- Date of birth: January 11, 1990 (age 36)
- Place of birth: Petah Tikva, Israel
- Height: 1.90 m (6 ft 3 in)
- Position: Goalkeeper

Youth career
- Hapoel Petah Tikva
- Beitar Shimshon Tel Aviv

Senior career*
Years	Team	Apps	(Gls)
2009–2010	Beitar Shimshon Tel Aviv	1	(0)
2010–2011	Maccabi Netanya	0	(0)
2011–2012	Snagov	15	(0)
2012	Concordia Chiajna	2	(0)
2012	CS Buftea	2	(0)
2013–2014	Unirea Slobozia	2	(0)
2014–2015	Hapoel Ramat Gan	2	(0)
2015–2016	Hapoel Morasha	9	(0)
2016	Hapoel Ramat Gan	0	(0)
2016–2017	Hapoel Bik'at HaYarden	5	(0)
2017–2018	Maccabi Kiryat Gat	6	(0)
- * Club domestic league appearances and goals

Idan Baruch (Hebrew: עידן ברוך; born 11 January 1990 in Petah Tikva) is a former Israeli-Romanian football goalkeeper.
