= Shaul Smadja =

Israeli footballer (born 1972)

Shaul Smadja שאול סמדג'ה
Personal information
- Full name: Shaul Smadja
- Date of birth: October 2, 1972 (age 54)
- Place of birth: Dimona, Israel
- Position: Goalkeeper

Team information
- Current team: Beitar Kfar Saba
- Number: 1

Youth career
- Hapoel Be'er Sheva

Senior career*
| Years | Team | Apps | (Gls) |
| 1989–1998 | Hapoel Be'er Sheva | | |
| 1998–1999 | Bnei Yehuda | 29 | (0) |
| 1999–2000 | Hapoel Kfar Saba | 36 | (0) |
| 2000–2001 | Maccabi Netanya | 22 | (0) |
| 2001–2002 | Hapoel Be'er Sheva | 3 | (0) |
| 2002–2003 | Maccabi Kafr Kanna | | |
| 2003–2007 | Maccabi Herzliya | 97 | (0) |
| 2007–2010 | Hapoel Ra'anana | 97 | (0) |
| 2010–2012 | Hapoel Nazareth Illit | 62 | (0) |
| 2012–2013 | Maccabi Ironi Bat Yam | 30 | (0) |
| 2013–2014 | Beitar Kfar Saba | 6 | (0) |
- * Club domestic league appearances and goals

Shaul Smadja (Hebrew: שאול סמדג'ה; born 2 October 1972) is a former Israeli footballer.

He is of a Tunisian-Jewish descent.

== Honours ==
- Liga Leumit (1):
  - 2005-06
