= Serge Ayeli =

Ivorian footballer

Personal information
- Full name: Serge Yves Roland Ayeli
- Date of birth: 23 August 1981 (age 45)
- Place of birth: Abiatté, Ivory Coast
- Height: 1.77 m (5 ft 9 1/2 in)
- Position: Striker

Youth career
- 1998–2001: OGC Nice

Senior career*
Years	Team	Apps	(Gls)
2001–2005	OGC Nice	48	(7)
2003–2004	LB Châteauroux (loan)	19	(1)
2005	FC Lorient	4	(0)
2006	Hapoel Ironi Kiryat Shmona	-	(-)
2006–2007	Hapoel Haifa	25	(7)
2007–2008	Hapoel Ra'anana	28	(8)
2008–2009	Maccabi Ahi Nazareth	28	(15)
2009–2010	Hapoel Ramat Gan	26	(7)
2010–2011	Beitar Jerusalem	9	(1)
2011	Hapoel Ashkelon	10	(1)
2011–2014	Maccabi Ahi Nazarth	65	(27)
2014	Hapoel Bnei Lod	7	(1)
2014–2015	Maccabi Yavne	16	(2)
2015	Hapoel Jerusalem	10	(1)

International career
2001–2003	Ivory Coast	7	(0)
- * Club domestic league appearances and goals as of 6 March 2015

Serge Yves Roland Ayeli (born 23 August 1981) is a retired Ivorian footballer, who played as a striker.
