= David Caveda =

Israeli professional football player

David Caveda דוד כבדה
Personal information
- Full name: David Caveda
- Date of birth: July 31, 1979 (age 47)
- Place of birth: Ethiopia
- Position: Midfielder

Team information
- Current team: Bnei Yeechalal
- Number: 7

Youth career
- Tzafririm Holon

Senior career*
| Years | Team | Apps | (Gls) |
| 1995–2008 | Tzafririm Holon | 244 | (21) |
| 2008–2009 | Hapoel Maxim Lod | 18 | (3) |
| 2009 | Ironi Ramla | 4 | (2) |
| 2009–2010 | F.C. Shikun HaMizrah | 17 | (2) |
| 2010–2014 | Bnei Yeechalal | 86 | (8) |
- * Club domestic league appearances and goals

David Caveda (also transliterated as David Kabeda) (Hebrew: דוד כבדה; born July 31, 1979) is an Israeli professional football (soccer) player who played most of his career in Tzafririm Holon.

== Honours ==
- Second Division
  - 1999-00
