= Ofir Amram =

Israeli footballer

Ofir Amram אופיר עמרם
Personal information
- Full name: Ofir Amram
- Date of birth: June 19, 1986 (age 40)
- Place of birth: Jerusalem, Israel
- Position: Midfielder

Team information
- Current team: Nordia Jerusalem

Youth career
- Hapoel Jerusalem

Senior career*
Years	Team	Apps	(Gls)
2006–2010	Hapoel Jerusalem	84	(9)
2010–2011	Maccabi Netanya	3	(0)
2011–2013	Beitar Jerusalem	14	(0)
2013–2015	Hapoel Jerusalem	67	(13)
2015–2017	Maccabi Herzliya	62	(14)
2017–2018	Nordia Jerusalem	22	(2)
- * Club domestic league appearances and goals

Ofir Amram (Hebrew: אופיר עמרם; born 19 June 1986) is an Israeli former footballer.

== Honours ==
- Liga Artzit (1):
  - 2007-08
