= Kobi Hassan =

Israeli footballer

Kobi Hassan קובי חסן
Personal information
- Full name: Ya'akov Hassan
- Date of birth: 26 September 1978 (age 48)
- Place of birth: Netanya, Israel
- Position: Midfielder

Youth career
- Maccabi Netanya

Senior career*
| Years | Team | Apps | (Gls) |
| 1996–2007 | Maccabi Netanya | 44 | (3) |
| 1999–2000 | → Maccabi Sha'arayim | 38 | (6) |
| 2000–2002 | → Hapoel Ramat Gan | 60 | (17) |
| 2002–2003 | → Maccabi Herzliya | 30 | (8) |
| 2004–2005 | → Hapoel Acre | 30 | (15) |
| 2006–2007 | → Hapoel Ramat Gan | 29 | (6) |
| 2007–2010 | Hapoel Ramat Gan | 69 | (17) |
| 2010 | Hakoah Amidar Ramat Gan | 14 | (5) |
| 2010–2011 | Hapoel Ramat HaSharon | 14 | (4) |
| 2011–2012 | Maccabi Umm al-Fahm | 11 | (0) |
| 2012 | Hapoel Bnei Lod | 19 | (4) |
| 2012–2013 | Hapoel Ra'anana | 35 | (12) |
| 2013–2014 | Maccabi Netanya | 17 | (3) |
| 2014–2015 | Hapoel Marmorek | 6 | (3) |
| 2015 | Hakoah Amidar Ramat Gan | 11 | (0) |
| 2015–2016 | Ironi Kiryat Ata | 28 | (8) |
| 2016 | Hapoel Herzliya | 4 | (0) |
| 2018–2019 | Maccabi HaSharon Netanya | 1 | (0) |
- * Club domestic league appearances and goals

Kobi Hassan (Hebrew: קובי חסן; born 26 September 1978) is a retired Israeli footballer who is mostly known for playing at Hapoel Ramat Gan and Maccabi Netanya.

He is of Tunisian-Jewish descent.
