= Snir Gueta =

Israeli footballer

Snir Gueta שניר גואטה
Personal information
- Full name: Snir Gueta
- Date of birth: 7 January 1988 (age 38)
- Place of birth: Eilat, Israel
- Position: Midfielder

Youth career
- Maccabi Haifa
- 2006–2007: Maccabi Netanya

Senior career*
Years	Team	Apps	(Gls)
2007–2013	Maccabi Netanya	55	(5)
2010–2011	→ Hapoel Ashkelon (loan)	30	(4)
2011–2012	→ Maccabi Kiryat Malakhi (loan)	10	(2)
2012	→ Hapoel Asi Gilboa (loan)	10	(3)
2012	→ Maccabi Kiryat Malakhi (loan)	1	(0)
2012–2013	→ Maccabi Sha'arayim (loan)	19	(2)
2014	FC Ashkelon	7	(6)

International career^{‡}
2004	Israel U17	1	(0)
2008	Israel U21	2	(0)
- * Club domestic league appearances and goals as of 19 December 2010 ‡ National team caps and goals as of 19 December 2010

Rabbi Snir Gueta (Hebrew: שניר גואטה; born 7 January 1988) is a retired Israeli professional football (soccer) player. He previously played for Maccabi Netanya, Hapoel Ashkelon, Maccabi Kiryat Malakhi, Hapoel Asi Gilboa and Maccabi Sha'arayim. At international level, Gueta was capped at under-17 and under-21 level.

Following retirement, he became a rabbi and began lecturing on spiritual awakening, and is advocating for Jewish people to undergo a process of Tshuva.

== Club career statistics ==
(correct as of May 2013)

Club	Season	League			Cup			Toto Cup			Europe			Total		
Club	Season	Apps	Goals	Assists	Apps	Goals	Assists	Apps	Goals	Assists	Apps	Goals	Assists	Apps	Goals	Assists
Maccabi Netanya	2007–08	18	0	0	3	0	0	4	0	0	0	0	0	25	0	0
Maccabi Netanya	2008–09	10	1	0	3	0	0	7	0	0	0	0	0	20	1	0
Maccabi Netanya	2009–10	27	4	0	1	0	0	6	1	1	2	0	0	36	5	1
Hapoel Ashkelon (on loan)	2010–11	30	4	1	2	1	0	5	0	0	0	0	0	37	5	1
Maccabi Kiryat Malakhi (on loan)	2011-12	10	2	1	1	0	0	0	0	0	0	0	0	11	2	1
Hapoel Asi Gilboa (on loan)	2011-12	10	3	1	1	0	0	0	0	0	0	0	0	11	3	1
Maccabi Kiryat Malakhi (on loan)	2012-13	1	0	0	0	0	0	0	0	0	0	0	0	1	0	0
Maccabi Sha'arayim (on loan)	2012-13	19	2	2	0	0	0	0	0	0	0	0	0	19	2	2
Career		125	16	5	11	1	0	22	1	1	2	0	0	160	18	6
