= Oded Gavish =

Israeli footballer

Personal information
- Full name: Oded Gavish
- Date of birth: 23 June 1989 (age 37)
- Place of birth: Tel Aviv, Israel
- Height: 1.89 m (6 ft 2 in)
- Position: Central defender

Youth career
- Maccabi Petah Tikva

Senior career*
Years	Team	Apps	(Gls)
2007–2008	Maccabi Petah Tikva	1	(0)
2008–2010	Maccabi Herzliya	46	(2)
2010–2013	Hapoel Be'er Sheva	89	(6)
2013–2014	Śląsk Wrocław	8	(0)
2013–2014	Śląsk Wrocław II	13	(3)
2014–2015	Maccabi Netanya	5	(0)
2015	Hapoel Petah Tikva	9	(0)
2015–2016	Maccabi Petah Tikva	13	(0)
2016–2017	Maccabi Sha'arayim	28	(2)
2017–2018	Hapoel Ashkelon	6	(0)
Total		218	(13)

International career
2007–2008	Israel U19	16	(0)
- * Club domestic league appearances and goals

Oded Gavish (Hebrew: עודד גביש; born 23 June 1989) is an Israeli former professional footballer who played as a defender.

== Career ==
=== Club ===
Gavish grew up in the Maccabi Petah Tikva youth academy. He played for two seasons at Maccabi Herzliya in the Israeli second division. In June 2010 Gavish signed a four-year contract with Hapoel Be'er Sheva.
