= Eliran George =

Israeli footballer (born 1992)

Eliran George 'אלירן ג'ורג
Personal information
- Full name: Eliran George
- Date of birth: 15 March 1992 (age 34)
- Place of birth: Hod HaSharon, Israel
- Position: Right back

Team information
- Current team: Hakoah Gale Gil Ramat Gan

Youth career
- 2006-2011: Maccabi Tel Aviv

Senior career*
Years	Team	Apps	(Gls)
2011–2014	Maccabi Tel Aviv	4	(0)
2011	→ Hapoel Haifa	2	(0)
2012	→ Hakoah Amidar Ramat Gan	12	(0)
2012–2013	→ Maccabi Yavne	23	(0)
2013–2014	→ Hapoel Katamon	26	(0)
2014	Hapoel Marmorek	6	(0)
2014–2015	Sektzia Ness Ziona	5	(0)
2015	Ironi Tiberias	5	(0)
2015–2016	Maccabi Kiryat Gat	31	(0)
2016	Hapoel Baqa al-Gharbiyye	6	(0)
2016–2017	Maccabi Jaffa	7	(1)
2017–2018	Beitar Kfar Saba	5	(1)
2018–2019	Hapoel Bik'at HaYarden	6	(0)
2019	Bnei Eilat	11	(0)
2019–2020	Ironi Kuseife	5	(0)
2020	Maccabi HaShikma Ramat Hen	3	(0)
2021–2022	Hakoah Gale Gil Ramat Gan	4	(0)

International career
2008–2009	Israel under-17	2	(0)
2010–2013	Israel under-19	10	(0)
- * Club domestic league appearances and goals

Eliran George (Hebrew: אלירן ג'ורג'; born 15 March 1992) is an Israeli footballer currently playing for Maccabi HaShikma Ramat Hen.

== Career ==
=== Club ===
George started his professional career with boyhood club, Maccabi Tel Aviv.

On 31 August 2011 George signed a contract for two years for Hapoel Haifa.
