= Ori Shitrit =

Israeli footballer

Ori Shitrit אורי שטרית
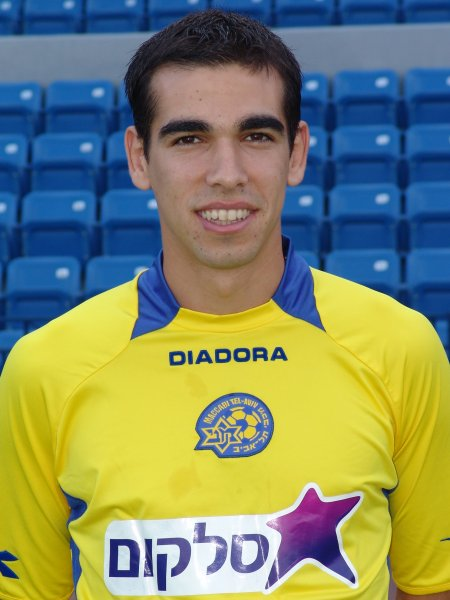
- Shitrit with Maccabi Tel Aviv

Personal information
- Date of birth: January 21, 1986 (age 40)
- Place of birth: Tel Aviv
- Height: 1.77 m (5 ft 10 in)
- Position: Left back

Youth career
- Maccabi Tel Aviv

Senior career*
| Years | Team | Apps | (Gls) |
| 2004–2016 | Maccabi Tel Aviv | 80 | (1) |
| 2010–2011 | → Hapoel Ironi Kiryat Shmona (loan) | 31 | (2) |
| 2011–2012 | → Bnei Sakhnin (loan) | 32 | (0) |
| 2012–2013 | → Maccabi Netanya (loan) | 22 | (0) |
| 2013–2014 | → Hapoel Nir Ramat HaSharon (loan) | 13 | (0) |
| 2014–2015 | → Maccabi Netanya (loan) | 14 | (1) |
| 2015–2016 | → Hapoel Kfar Saba (loan) | 12 | (0) |

International career
| 2002–2003 | Israel U17 | 13 | (1) |
| 2004 | Israel U18 | 3 | (0) |
| 2004 | Israel U19 | 1 | (0) |
| 2007–2008 | Israel U21 | 6 | (0) |
- * Club domestic league appearances and goals as of 11 September 2014

Ori Shitrit (Hebrew: אורי שטרית), born January 21, 1986) is a retired Israeli footballer. At international level, Shitrit was capped at levels from under-17 to under-21.

== Honours ==
- Toto Cup:
  - 2008–09
