= Meir Cohen (footballer) =

Israeli football player

Meir Cohen מאיר כהן
Personal information
- Full name: Meir Cohen
- Date of birth: 8 June 1972 (age 54)
- Place of birth: Bet She'an, Israel
- Position: Goalkeeper

Team information
- Current team: Daburiyya (Manager)

Youth career
- Hapoel Beit She'an

Senior career*
Years	Team	Apps	(Gls)
1989–2000	Hapoel Beit She'an	112	(0)
2000	Maccabi Herzliya	16	(0)
2000–2002	Bnei Sakhnin	42	(0)
2002–2004	Maccabi Ahi Nazareth	61	(0)
2004	Ironi Nir Ramat HaSharon	11	(0)
2004–2011	Bnei Sakhnin	187	(0)
2011	Hapoel Rishon LeZion	13	(0)
2011–2012	Maccabi Umm al-Fahm	25	(0)
2012–2013	Hapoel Nazareth Illit	38	(0)
2013–2016	Hapoel Afula	104	(0)
2016	Hapoel Nazareth Illit	0	(0)
2016–2017	Tzeirei Kafr Kanna	9	(0)
2017	Hapoel Asi Gilboa	12	(0)
2017–2018	Hapoel Beit She'an	9	(0)
Total		639	(0)

Managerial career
- 2020–: Daburiyya
- * Club domestic league appearances and goals

Meir Cohen (Hebrew: מאיר כהן; born 8 June 1972 in Israel) is an Israeli retired football player.

== Honours ==
- Liga Leumit:
  - Winner (1): 2002–03
  - Runner-up (3): 1993–94, 2006–07, 2010–11
- Liga Alef:
  - Winner (1): 1992–93
