= Idan Srur =

Israeli footballer

Idan Srur עידן סרור
Personal information
- Full name: Idan Srur
- Date of birth: October 5, 1986 (age 40)
- Place of birth: Ramla, Israel
- Height: 1.70 m (5 ft 7 in)
- Position: Midfielder

Team information
- Current team: Sektzia Ness Ziona

Youth career
- 1996–2001: Sektzia Ness Ziona
- 2001–2004: Hapoel Tel Aviv

Senior career*
Years	Team	Apps	(Gls)
2004–2009	Hapoel Tel Aviv	28	(0)
2005–2007	→ Hapoel Petah Tikva (loan)	43	(4)
2009	→ Ironi Kiryat Shmona (loan)	12	(0)
2009–2010	→ Hapoel Petah Tikva (loan)	30	(1)
2011–2012	Hapoel Ramat Gan	18	(1)
2012	F.C. Ashdod	5	(0)
2012	Hapoel F.C. Karmiel Safed	7	(2)
2012–2014	Sektzia Ness Ziona	12	(3)
2012–2013	Ortodoxim Lod	7	(3)
2013–2014	Hapoel Marmorek	20	(3)
2013–2014	→ Maccabi Be'er Ya'akov (loan)	25	(8)
2014–2016	Bnei Eilat	56	(15)
2016–2017	Hapoel Hod HaSharon	34	(10)
2017	Ironi Bnei Kabul	2	(0)
2017–2018	Beitar Kfar Saba	13	(4)
2018–2019	Hapoel Bik'at HaYarden	21	(4)
2019	Shimshon Bnei Tayibe	9	(7)
2019–2020	Beitar Petah Tikva	13	(3)
2020–2021	Holon Yermiyahu	3	(0)
2021	Beitar Kfar Saba	18	(4)
2021–2022	Beitar Petah Tikva	2	(0)
2022	F.C. Ramla	11	(2)
2022–2023	Beitar Kfar Saba	12	(1)
2023	Maccabi HaShikma Ramat Hen	7	(2)
2023–2024	Hapoel Gedera	10	(2)
2024	Maccabi Be'er Ya'akov	4	(1)
2024	Hapoel Gan Yavne	1	(0)
2025	Hapoel Marmorek	0	(0)
2025–	Sektzia Ness Ziona	1	(0)

International career
2005	Israel U18	2	(0)
2004–2005	Israel U19	7	(1)
2006–2008	Israel U21	19	(2)
- * Club domestic league appearances and goals as of 1 June 2025

Idan Srur (Hebrew: עידן סרור; born October 5, 1986) is an Israeli footballer who currently plays for Sektzia Ness Ziona.

He is of a Tunisian-Jewish descent.

== Career ==
Srur moved to Hapoel Tel Aviv youth ranks at the age of 15 and made it to the first team three years later. A two-year loan spell at Hapoel Petah Tikva ended with Srur signing a four-year contract with Hapoel Tel Aviv. After not making an impact with the first team, he was again loaned to Hapoel Kiryat Shmona and Hapoel Petah Tikva, his current team.
