= Eliran Asao =

Israeli footballer

Eliran Asao אלירן אסאו
Personal information
- Full name: Eliyahu Eliran Asao
- Date of birth: February 3, 1985 (age 41)
- Place of birth: Ashkelon, Israel
- Position: Striker

Youth career
- Hapoel Ashkelon
- Hapoel Petah Tikva

Senior career*
Years	Team	Apps	(Gls)
2004–2006	Hapoel Ashkelon		
2006–2007	Hapoel Ramat Gan	26	(15)
2007–2008	Hapoel Ashkelon	9	(0)
2008	Bnei Yehuda Tel Aviv	4	(0)
2008–2010	Hapoel Ashkelon	45	(9)
2010	Hapoel Ramat Gan	2	(0)
2010–2011	Maccabi Ahi Nazareth	4	(0)
2011	Maccabi Kiryat Malakhi	23	(7)
- * Club domestic league appearances and goals

Eliran Asao (Hebrew: אלירן אסאו; born February 3, 1985) is a former Israeli footballer. Asao played in Hapoel Ashkelon, Bnei Yehuda and Hapoel Ramat Gan, among others, before having to retire through injury in 2011.
