= Zion Tzemah =

Israeli footballer

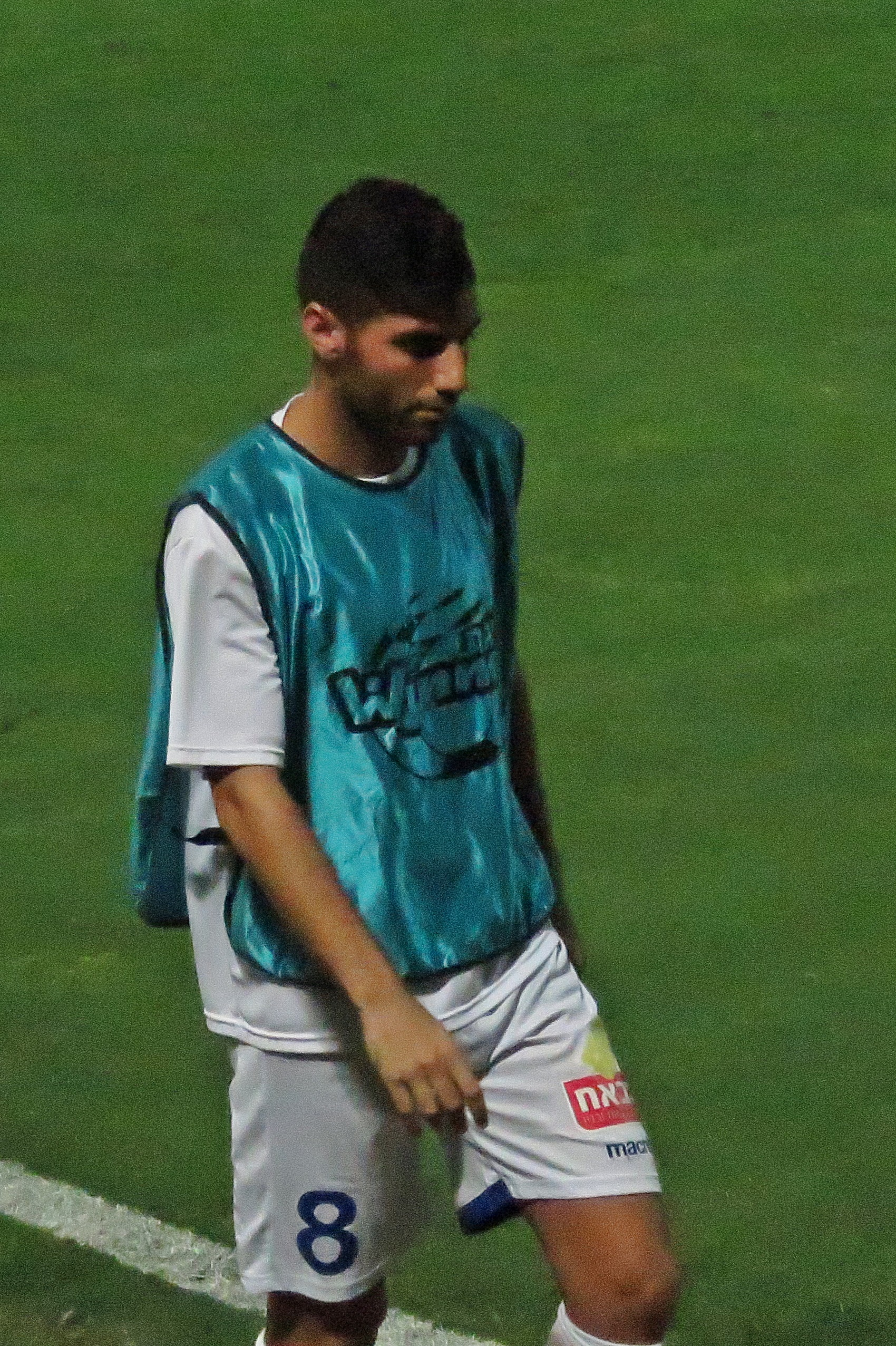
- Tzemah with Hapoel Acre in 2015

Personal information
- Full name: Zion Tzemah
- Date of birth: January 19, 1990 (age 36)
- Place of birth: Kiryat Ono, Israel
- Position: Attacking midfielder

Team information
- Current team: Hapoel Gan Yavne

Youth career
- Maccabi Tel Aviv

Senior career*
Years	Team	Apps	(Gls)
2007–2011	Maccabi Tel Aviv	15	(1)
2010	→ Sektzia Ness Ziona	13	(2)
2011	→ Hapoel Ramat Gan	16	(3)
2011–2012	Maccabi Petah Tikva	30	(1)
2012–2013	F.C. Ashdod	16	(0)
2013	Hakoah Amidar Ramat Gan	12	(0)
2014	Enosis Neon Paralimni	8	(0)
2014–2017	Hapoel Acre	66	(13)
2017–2018	Beitar Jerusalem	3	(1)
2018	→ Hapoel Ashkelon	2	(0)
2018–2019	Hapoel Iksal	33	(6)
2019	Hapoel Ramat HaSharon	0	(0)
2019–2020	Hapoel Ashkelon	19	(3)
2020	Hapoel Bnei Lod	13	(1)
2020–2022	Hapoel Ashkelon	49	(8)
2022–2023	Hapoel Rishon LeZion	12	(0)
2023	Maccabi Sha'arayim	12	(2)
2024–	Hapoel Gan Yavne	5	(2)

International career
2006	Israel U17	2	(0)
2008	Israel U18	2	(0)
2008–2010	Israel U19	7	(1)
2010–2012	Israel U21	10	(2)
- * Club domestic league appearances and goals as of 22 January 2024

Zion Tzemah (Hebrew: ציון צמח; born January 19, 1990) is an Israeli footballer who plays for Hapoel Gan Yavne as an attacking midfielder.
