= 2016–17 Liga Leumit =

Liga Leumit
- Season: 2016–17
- Champions: Maccabi Netanya
- Promoted: Hapoel Acre
- Relegated: Maccabi Sha'arayim; Hapoel Jerusalem
- Matches played: 296
- Goals scored: 765 (2.58 per match)
- Top goalscorer: Jordan Faucher (24)
- Biggest home win: Maccabi Ahi Nazareth 6–0 Hapoel Katamon Jerusalem (16 December 2016)
- Biggest away win: Hapoel Ramat Gan 1-5 Hapoel Bnei Lod (8 May 2017) and 8 more matches with away wins by 4 goals difference
- Highest scoring: Hapoel Petah Tikva 6-3 Hapoel Katamon Jerusalem (21 April 2017)
- All statistics correct as of 14 July 2018.

The 2016–17 Liga Leumit is the 18th season as second tier since its re-alignment in 1999 and the 75th season of second-tier football in Israel.

A total of sixteen teams are contesting in the league, including twelve sides from the 2015–16 season, the two promoted teams from 2015–16 Liga Alef and the two relegated teams from 2015–16 Israeli Premier League.

== Changes from 2015–16 season ==
=== Team changes ===
F.C. Ashdod and Hapoel Ashkelon, were promoted to the 2016–17 Israeli Premier League.

Maccabi Netanya and Hapoel Acre were relegated after finishing as the two bottom-placed clubs in the 2015–16 Israeli Premier League.

Maccabi Kiryat Gat, and Maccabi Yavne were directly relegated to Liga Alef after finishing in the previous season in last two league places. They were replaced the top placed teams from each division of 2015–16 Liga Alef, Maccabi Sha'arayim (from South Division) and Ironi Nesher (from North Division).

== Overview ==
=== Stadia and locations ===
Club	Home City	Stadium	Capacity
Beitar Tel Aviv Ramla	Tel Aviv and Ramla	Ramla Municipal Stadium	2,000
Hapoel Afula	Afula	Afula Illit Stadium	3,000
Hapoel Acre	Acre	Acre Municipal Stadium	5,000
Hapoel Bnei Lod	Lod	Lod Municipal Stadium	3,000
Hapoel Jerusalem	Jerusalem	Teddy Stadium	31,733
Hapoel Katamon Jerusalem	Jerusalem	Teddy Stadium	31,733
Hapoel Nazareth Illit	Nazareth Illit	Green Stadium	4,000
Hapoel Petah Tikva	Petah Tikva	HaMoshava Stadium	11,500
Hapoel Ramat Gan	Ramat Gan	Ramat Gan Stadium	13,370
Hapoel Ramat HaSharon	Ramat HaSharon	Grundman Stadium	4,300
Hapoel Rishon LeZion	Rishon LeZion	Haberfeld Stadium	6,000
Ironi Nesher	Nesher	Nesher Stadium	2,500
Maccabi Ahi Nazareth	Nazareth	Ilut Stadium	4,932
Maccabi Herzliya	Herzliya	Herzliya Municipal Stadium	8,100
Maccabi Netanya	Netanya	Netanya Stadium	13,610
Maccabi Sha'arayim	Ness Ziona	Ness Ziona Stadium^{[A]}	3,500

^A The club is playing their home games at a neutral venue because their own ground does not meet Premier League requirements.

== Regular season ==
=== Regular season table ===
Pos	Team	Pld	W	D	L	GF	GA	GD	Pts	Qualification
1	Maccabi Netanya	30	17	12	1	65	32	+33	54 (Note: Maccabi Netanya had 9 points deducted for entering administration.)	Qualification for the Promotion playoffs
2	Hapoel Acre	30	15	9	6	50	30	+20	54	Qualification for the Promotion playoffs
3	Hapoel Ramat Gan	30	15	7	8	46	28	+18	52	Qualification for the Promotion playoffs
4	Beitar Tel Aviv Ramla	30	11	11	8	49	35	+14	44	Qualification for the Promotion playoffs
5	Hapoel Petah Tikva	30	11	9	10	39	38	+1	42	Qualification for the Promotion playoffs
6	Hapoel Katamon Jerusalem	30	12	6	12	40	46	−6	42	Qualification for the Promotion playoffs
7	Maccabi Ahi Nazareth	30	9	13	8	37	30	+7	40	Qualification for the Promotion playoffs
8	Hapoel Bnei Lod	30	11	6	13	39	52	−13	39	Qualification for the Promotion playoffs
9	Hapoel Afula	30	8	14	8	42	46	−4	38	Qualification for the Relegation playoffs
10	Hapoel Rishon LeZion	30	8	12	10	28	29	−1	36	Qualification for the Relegation playoffs
11	Maccabi Herzliya	30	8	11	11	37	44	−7	35	Qualification for the Relegation playoffs
12	Ironi Nesher	30	7	13	10	22	32	−10	34	Qualification for the Relegation playoffs
13	Hapoel Ramat HaSharon	30	8	9	13	27	38	−11	33	Qualification for the Relegation playoffs
14	Hapoel Nazareth Illit	30	7	10	13	25	43	−18	31	Qualification for the Relegation playoffs
15	Hapoel Jerusalem	30	7	8	15	22	38	−16	29	Qualification for the Relegation playoffs
16	Maccabi Sha'arayim	30	6	10	14	28	35	−7	28	Qualification for the Relegation playoffs

Source: Liga Leumit IFA
Rules for classification: 1) points; 2) goal difference; 3) number of wins; 4) goals scored; 5) head to head; 6)deciding match.

== Playoffs ==
=== Top Playoff ===
==== Top Playoff table ====
Pos	Team	Pld	W	D	L	GF	GA	GD	Pts	Promotion
1	Maccabi Netanya	37	22	13	2	80	41	+39	70 (Note: Maccabi Netanya had 9 points deducted for entering administration.)	Promoted to Israeli Premier League
2	Hapoel Acre	37	17	11	9	58	41	+17	62	Promoted to Israeli Premier League
3	Beitar Tel Aviv Ramla	37	16	11	10	67	39	+28	59	
4	Hapoel Ramat Gan	37	15	10	12	53	46	+7	55	
5	Hapoel Katamon Jerusalem	37	15	8	14	55	56	−1	53	
6	Hapoel Petah Tikva	37	14	11	12	55	51	+4	52 (Note: Hapoel Petah Tikva had 1 point deducted for failing to file its financial reports.)	
7	Hapoel Bnei Lod	37	13	8	16	49	62	−13	47	
8	Maccabi Ahi Nazareth	37	10	15	12	45	52	−7	45	

Source: Liga Leumit IFA
Rules for classification: 1) points; 2) goal difference; 3) number of wins; 4) goals scored; 5) head to head; 6)deciding match.

=== Bottom Playoff ===
==== Bottom Playoff table ====
Pos	Team	Pld	W	D	L	GF	GA	GD	Pts	Relegation
9	Hapoel Ramat HaSharon	37	12	11	14	38	42	−4	47	
10	Hapoel Rishon LeZion	37	11	13	13	38	39	−1	46	
11	Hapoel Afula	37	9	18	10	55	59	−4	45	
12	Ironi Nesher	37	9	16	12	26	35	−9	43	
13	Maccabi Herzliya	37	10	13	14	45	55	−10	43	
14	Hapoel Nazareth Illit	37	9	13	15	32	53	−21	40	Qualification for the Relegation Playoffs
15	Hapoel Jerusalem	37	9	11	17	29	44	−15	38	Relegated to Liga Alef
16	Maccabi Sha'arayim	37	8	12	17	40	50	−10	36	Relegated to Liga Alef

Source: Liga Leumit IFA
Rules for classification: 1) points; 2) goal difference; 3) number of wins; 4) goals scored; 5) head to head; 6)deciding match.

== Positions by round ==
The table lists the positions of teams after each week of matches.

Team ╲ Round	1	2	3	4	5	6	7	8	9	10	11	12	13	14	15	16	17	18	19	20	21	22	23	24	25	26	27	28	29	30	31	32	33	34	35	36	37
Maccabi Netanya	16	16	16	16	16	12	13	8	5	5	3	4	4	3	3	2	1	1	1	1	1	1	1	1	1	1	1	2	2	1	1	1	1	1	1	1	1
Hapoel Acre	10	15	14	7	4	2	2	2	3	2	1	2	1	1	1	1	2	2	2	3	2	2	3	3	2	2	2	1	1	2	2	2	2	2	2	2	2
Beitar Tel Aviv Ramla	4	13	6	2	2	3	3	3	2	3	4	3	3	4	4	4	4	3	3	2	3	4	4	4	4	3	4	4	5	4	5	4	4	4	4	3	3
Hapoel Ramat Gan	1	1	1	3	1	1	1	1	1	1	2	1	2	2	2	3	3	4	4	4	4	3	2	2	3	4	3	3	3	3	3	3	3	3	3	4	4
Hapoel Katamon Jerusalem	3	3	8	13	9	11	14	13	14	14	12	14	12	13	15	13	14	15	12	10	12	13	11	13	12	11	7	6	7	6	6	6	6	7	6	5	5
Hapoel Petah Tikva	10	7	9	8	11	14	11	14	13	11	13	12	14	12	9	11	9	10	11	9	10	9	10	8	5	6	5	5	4	5	4	5	5	5	5	6	6
Hapoel Bnei Lod	15	14	15	11	13	13	10	6	10	12	14	9	8	10	12	7	11	8	7	6	6	6	6	7	11	12	8	9	9	8	8	7	7	8	7	7	7
Maccabi Ahi Nazareth	10	7	10	8	12	9	12	11	9	6	6	6	6	6	6	6	6	7	8	7	7	10	7	10	6	7	9	7	6	7	7	8	8	6	8	8	8
Hapoel Ramat HaSharon	10	7	3	1	3	5	7	10	11	9	9	10	13	14	13	15	15	13	14	14	13	15	14	15	15	15	14	15	13	13	12	11	12	12	12	10	9
Hapoel Rishon LeZion	10	5	2	4	7	4	6	4	4	4	5	8	7	7	8	9	8	6	5	5	5	5	5	6	7	8	10	10	10	10	9	10	10	10	10	11	10
Hapoel Afula	2	4	13	14	10	8	9	12	12	13	10	11	10	9	11	12	10	11	9	12	11	11	12	11	9	5	6	8	8	9	10	9	9	9	9	9	11
Ironi Nesher	4	7	4	6	8	7	8	9	6	8	8	5	5	5	5	5	5	5	6	8	8	8	9	9	10	10	12	12	12	12	13	13	14	13	13	13	12
Maccabi Herzliya	4	2	6	5	5	6	4	5	8	7	7	7	9	8	7	8	7	9	10	11	9	7	8	5	8	9	11	11	11	11	11	12	11	11	11	12	13
Hapoel Nazareth Illit	4	7	12	15	14	16	15	15	15	15	15	15	15	15	14	14	13	14	15	15	15	14	13	14	14	14	15	16	14	14	14	14	13	15	15	14	14
Hapoel Jerusalem	4	12	5	10	6	10	5	7	7	10	11	13	11	11	10	10	12	12	13	13	14	12	15	12	13	13	13	13	16	15	16	15	15	14	14	15	15
Maccabi Sha'arayim	4	5	11	12	15	15	16	16	16	16	16	16	16	16	16	16	16	16	16	16	16	16	16	16	16	16	16	14	15	16	15	16	16	16	16	16	16

Updated to match(es) played on 19 May 2017. Source: IFA

== Promotion/relegation playoff ==
The 14th-placed team will face 2016–17 Liga Alef promotion play-offs winner in a two-legged tie. The matches took place on 27 and 30 May 2017.

26 May 2017
16:00 UTC+3

F.C. Kafr Qasim	1 – 1	Hapoel Nazareth Illit
Edelstein 55'	Report (in Hebrew)	Atar 7'

Winter Stadium, Ramat Gan
Referee: Alon Yefet

30 May 2017
15:00 UTC+3

Hapoel Nazareth Illit	2–1 (a.e.t.)	F.C. Kafr Qasim
Atar 64'; Amsis 98'	Report	52' Ben Shimon

Green Stadium, Nazareth Illit
Referee: Erez Papir

Hapoel Nazareth Illit won 3–2 on aggregate and remained in Liga Leumit. F.C. Kafr Qasim remained in Liga Alef.

== See also ==
- 2016–17 Toto Cup Leumit
