= 2013–14 Liga Leumit =

Liga Leumit
- Season: 2013–14
- Champions: Maccabi Netanya F.C.
- Promoted: Maccabi Netanya F.C. Hapoel Petah Tikva
- Relegated: Maccabi Umm al-Fahm F.C. Hapoel Ashkelon; Hapoel Katamon Jerusalem
- Matches played: 296
- Goals scored: 791 (2.67 per match)
- Top goalscorer: Shahar Hirsh (20)
- Biggest home win: Maccabi Yavne 9–1 Maccabi Umm al-Fahm
- Biggest away win: Maccabi Umm al-Fahm 0–8 Hapoel Ashkelon
- Highest scoring: Maccabi Yavne 9–1 Maccabi Umm al-Fahm

The 2013–14 Liga Leumit was the fifteenth season since its introduction in 1999 and the 72nd season of second-tier football in Israel. It began on 8 September 2013 and will end in May 2014.

A total of sixteen teams are contesting in the league, including twelve sides from the 2012–13 season, two promoted team from the 2012–13 Liga Alef and two relegated teams from the 2012–13 Israeli Premier League.

== Changes from 2012–13 season ==
=== Team changes ===
Location of teams in the 2013–14 Liga Leumit

Maccabi Petah Tikva, and Hapoel Ra'anana, were promoted to the 2013–14 Israeli Premier League.

Maccabi Netanya, and Hapoel Ramat Gan were directly relegated to the 2013–14 Liga Leumit after finishing the 2012–13 Israeli Premier League season in the bottom two places.

Sektzia Nes Tziona, and Hapoel Kfar Saba were directly relegated to Liga Alef after finishing in the previous season in last two league places. They were replaced by Hapoel Afula who finished first in Liga Alef North, and Hapoel Katamon who finished first in Liga Alef South.

== Overview ==
=== Stadia and locations ===
Club	Stadium	Capacity
Beitar Tel Aviv Ramla	Ramla Municipal Stadium	2,000
Hakoah Amidar Ramat Gan	Winter Stadium	8,000
Hapoel Afula	Green Stadium^{[A]}	4,000
Hapoel Ashkelon	Sala Stadium	5,250
Hapoel Bnei Lod	Lod Municipal Stadium	3,000
Hapoel Jerusalem	Teddy Stadium	31,733
Hapoel Katamon	Teddy Stadium	31,733
Hapoel Nazareth Illit	Green Stadium	4,000
Hapoel Petah Tikva	HaMoshava Stadium	11,500
Hapoel Ramat Gan	Winter Stadium	8,000
Hapoel Rishon LeZion	Haberfeld Stadium	6,000
Maccabi Ahi Nazareth	Ilut Stadium	4,932
Maccabi Herzliya	Herzliya Municipal Stadium	8,100
Maccabi Netanya	Netanya Stadium	13,610
Maccabi Umm al-Fahm	Ilut Stadium^{[B]}	4,932
Maccabi Yavne	Ness Ziona Stadium^{[C]}	3,500

^A While Afula Municipal Stadium is under construction. Hapoel Afula will host their home games in Green Stadium.
^B The club is playing their home games at a neutral venue because their own ground does not meet Premier League requirements.
^C While Yavne Municipal Stadium is under construction. Maccabi Yavne will host their home games in Ness Ziona Stadium until January 2014.

== Regular season ==
Pos	Team	Pld	W	D	L	GF	GA	GD	Pts	Promotion or relegation
1	Maccabi Netanya	30	20	7	3	51	26	+25	67	Top Playoff
2	Hapoel Petah Tikva	30	15	7	8	38	30	+8	52	Top Playoff
3	Hapoel Bnei Lod	30	13	10	7	56	29	+27	49	Top Playoff
4	Maccabi Ahi Nazareth	30	12	9	9	41	34	+7	45	Top Playoff
5	Hapoel Nazareth Illit	30	11	10	9	29	34	−5	43	Top Playoff
6	Hapoel Ramat Gan	30	10	11	9	40	30	+10	41	Top Playoff
7	Hapoel Afula	30	9	13	8	48	32	+16	40	Top Playoff
8	Beitar Tel Aviv Ramla	30	9	13	8	32	30	+2	40	Top Playoff
9	Maccabi Herzliya	30	10	9	11	36	32	+4	39	Bottom Playoff
10	Hakoah Amidar Ramat Gan	30	11	9	10	33	37	−4	39 (Note: Hakoah Amidar Ramat Gan were deducted three points for violation of the budgetary control authority regulations.)	Bottom Playoff
11	Hapoel Katamon Jerusalem	30	10	9	11	41	45	−4	39	Bottom Playoff
12	Hapoel Rishon LeZion	30	11	6	13	43	47	−4	39	Bottom Playoff
13	Hapoel Ashkelon	30	9	11	10	47	34	+13	38	Bottom Playoff
14	Hapoel Jerusalem	30	8	13	9	35	31	+4	37	Bottom Playoff
15	Maccabi Yavne	30	10	6	14	43	45	−2	36	Bottom Playoff
16	Maccabi Umm al-Fahm (R)	30	0	1	29	14	111	−97	−4 (Note: Maccabi Umm al-Fahm were deducted two points for violation of the budgetary control authority regulations and an additional three points for fielding a suspended player.)	Bottom Playoff

Updated to match(es) played on 3 March 2014. Source: Israel Football Association
Rules for classification: 1st points; 2nd goal difference; 3rd matches won; 4th goals scored; 5th head-to-head; 6th decision match. Winners of 2013–14 Israel State Cup qualify for the second qualifying round of the UEFA Europa League.
(R) Relegated
Notes:

Home \ Away	BTR	HAR	HAF	HAS	HBL	HJE	HKN	HNI	HPT	HRG	HRL	MAN	MHE	MNE	MUF	MYA
Beitar Tel Aviv Ramla		3–0	0–1	1–1	1–0	2–1	1–1	2–2	0–0	2–1	0–0	0–1	2–1	0–1	2–1	2–0
Hakoah Amidar Ramat Gan	1–1		1–0	1–0	2–2	1–2	0–0	2–1	1–1	1–0	2–1	1–1	2–3	1–2	2–0	4–2
Hapoel Afula	1–1	0–1		1–1	0–0	0–0	2–0	3–1	1–2	1–1	6–1	0–1	0–0	2–2	3–1	1–1
Hapoel Ashkelon	4–1	2–0	1–2		1–3	0–0	1–1	3–0	3–0	0–1	0–0	1–1	1–0	0–1	3–0	0–2
Hapoel Bnei Lod	0–0	4–3	3–2	1–1		1–1	3–1	3–0	0–0	1–1	0–1	3–0	1–0	0–0	7–0	4–1
Hapoel Jerusalem	2–2	0–1	2–2	1–0	1–0		1–2	0–1	1–0	2–2	2–2	1–1	0–2	0–2	3–1	1–0
Hapoel Katamon Jerusalem	1–0	0–0	0–0	3–3	0–3	1–1		2–2	0–1	0–4	3–0	0–3	2–0	0–1	5–0	3–2
Hapoel Nazareth Illit	1–1	0–0	0–3	1–0	1–0	1–0	0–1		2–1	3–2	1–2	1–1	0–0	1–1	1–0	0–0
Hapoel Petah Tikva	1–0	3–1	0–2	3–3	1–0	1–0	3–1	3–0		1–0	0–2	1–0	1–1	2–3	2–1	1–1
Hapoel Ramat Gan	2–2	0–0	1–1	1–3	3–0	0–0	1–2	1–2	1–0		0–1	3–1	1–2	2–2	1–0	2–0
Hapoel Rishon LeZion	3–1	2–1	3–1	1–3	1–1	0–1	4–1	0–1	2–3	0–1		1–2	1–1	1–5	3–0	2–1
Maccabi Ahi Nazareth	0–0	0–1	5–4	2–0	2–2	3–2	1–1	0–0	0–1	1–1	3–2		0–2	0–1	4–1	2–1
Maccabi Herzliya	0–1	1–1	1–1	1–1	2–3	0–0	3–2	0–1	0–0	0–3	2–1	0–2		3–2	4–0	0–1
Maccabi Netanya	2–1	4–0	2–1	2–1	1–0	1–1	3–2	1–1	0–2	1–1	1–3	1–0	2–1		2–0	3–0
Maccabi Umm al-Fahm	0–2	0–2	0–7	0–8	0–7	0–6	2–4	0–4	2–3	0–2	2–2	0–3	0–5	0–1		2–4
Maccabi Yavne	1–1	2–0	0–0	3–1	2–4	1–3	0–2	2–0	2–1	1–1	2–1	2–1	0–1	0–1	9–1	

Updated to match(es) played on 13 February 2014. Source: Israel Football Association
Legend: Blue = home team win; Yellow = draw; Red = away team win.

== Playoffs ==
Key numbers for pairing determination (number marks position after 30 games):

Rounds
31st	32nd	33rd	34th	35th	36th	37th
1 – 8; 2 – 7; 3 – 6; 4 – 5	1 – 2; 6 – 4; 7 – 3; 8 – 5	2 – 8; 3 – 1; 4 – 7; 5 – 6	1 – 4; 2 – 3; 7 – 5; 8 – 6	3 – 8; 4 – 2; 5 – 1; 6 – 7	1 – 6; 2 – 5; 3 – 4; 8 – 7	4 – 8; 5 – 3; 6 – 2; 7 – 1
9 – 16; 10 – 15; 11 – 14; 12 – 13	9 – 10; 14 – 12; 15 – 11; 16 – 13	10 – 16; 11 – 9; 12 – 15; 13 – 14	9 – 12; 10 – 11; 15 – 13; 16 – 14	11 – 16; 12 – 10; 13 – 9; 14 – 15	9 – 14; 10 – 13; 11 – 12; 16 – 15	12 – 16; 13 – 11; 14 – 10; 15 – 9

=== Top Playoff ===
Pos	Team	Pld	W	D	L	GF	GA	GD	Pts	Promotion or relegation
1	Maccabi Netanya (P)	37	24	9	4	67	35	+32	81	Promotion to Israeli Premier League
2	Hapoel Petah Tikva (P)	37	18	10	9	48	37	+11	64	Promotion to Israeli Premier League
3	Hapoel Bnei Lod	37	16	12	9	67	36	+31	60	
4	Maccabi Ahi Nazareth	37	15	12	10	52	43	+9	57	
5	Hapoel Ramat Gan	37	13	13	11	51	36	+15	52	
6	Hapoel Afula	37	11	16	10	60	43	+17	49	
7	Beitar Tel Aviv Ramla	37	10	15	12	39	45	−6	45	
8	Hapoel Nazareth Illit	37	11	11	15	34	53	−19	44	

Source: Israel Football Association
Rules for classification: 1st points; 2nd goal difference; 3rd matches won; 4th goals scored; 5th head-to-head; 6th decision match
(P) Promoted

Home \ Away	BTR	HAF	HBL	HNI	HPT	HRG	MAN	MNE
Beitar Tel Aviv Ramla		0–4		2–0		0–0		
Hapoel Afula			0–2	2–2				3–2
Hapoel Bnei Lod	4–1					0–1	1–1	1–1
Hapoel Nazareth Illit			1–3			1–6		1–2
Hapoel Petah Tikva	1–1	1–1	2–0	3–0				
Hapoel Ramat Gan		3–1			2–2		1–2	
Maccabi Ahi Nazareth	3–2	1–1		1–0	1–2			
Maccabi Netanya	3–1				4–1	2–0	2–2	

Source: Israel Football Association
Legend: Blue = home team win; Yellow = draw; Red = away team win.

=== Bottom Playoff ===
Pos	Team	Pld	W	D	L	GF	GA	GD	Pts	Relegation
9	Maccabi Yavne	37	14	9	14	55	46	+9	51	
10	Maccabi Herzliya	37	13	11	13	49	39	+10	50	
11	Hapoel Rishon LeZion	37	14	8	15	55	53	+2	50	
12	Hapoel Jerusalem	37	11	16	10	47	39	+8	49	
13	Hakoah Amidar Ramat Gan	37	13	12	12	45	46	−1	48 (Note: Hakoah Amidar Ramat Gan were deducted three points for violation of the budgetary control authority regulations.)	
14	Hapoel Katamon Jerusalem (R)	37	12	12	13	52	56	−4	48	Relegation to Liga Alef
15	Hapoel Ashkelon (R)	37	11	13	13	55	45	+10	46	Relegation to Liga Alef
16	Maccabi Umm al-Fahm (R)	37	0	1	36	15	139	−124	−4 (Note: Maccabi Umm al-Fahm were deducted five points for entering administration.)	Relegation to Liga Alef

Source: Israel Football Association
Rules for classification: 1st points; 2nd goal difference; 3rd matches won; 4th goals scored; 5th head-to-head; 6th decision match
(R) Relegated
Notes:

Home \ Away	HAR	HAS	HJE	HKN	HRL	MHE	MUF	MYA
Hakoah Amidar Ramat Gan			1–1	1–2		2–1	6–0	
Hapoel Ashkelon	4–1		0–2			0–0		
Hapoel Jerusalem				3–2	2–2			0–0
Hapoel Katamon Jerusalem		1–1			0–2		3–1	1–1
Hapoel Rishon LeZion	1–1	4–0					3–0	0–1
Maccabi Herzliya			3–2	2–2	2–0		5–0	
Maccabi Umm al-Fahm		0–3	0–2					0–6
Maccabi Yavne	0–0	3–0				1–0		

Source: Israel Football Association
Legend: Blue = home team win; Yellow = draw; Red = away team win.

== Relegation playoff ==
The 14th-placed Hapoel Katamon Jerusalem faced 2013–14 Liga Alef promotion play-offs winner, Ironi Tiberias. The matches took place on May 23 and 27, 2014.

23 May 2014
16:00 UTC+3

Hapoel Katamon Jerusalem	0 - 3	Ironi Tiberias
	Report (in Hebrew)	Elimelech 31'; Lazmi 39' 85'

Teddy Stadium, Jerusalem
Referee: Liran Liani

27 May 2014
16:00 UTC+3

Ironi Tiberias	2 - 1	Hapoel Katamon Jerusalem
Akiva 5' (p) Lazmi 36'	Report (in Hebrew)	Aharon 64'

Green Stadium, Nazareth Illit
Referee: Eitan Shmuelevich

Ironi Tiberias won 5–1 on aggregate and promoted to Liga Leumit. Hapoel Katamon Jerusalem relegated to Liga Alef.

== Hat-tricks ==
Player	For	Against	Result	Date
(Israel) Ran Ben Shimon	Hapoel Bnei Lod	Maccabi Umm al-Fahm	7–0	5 November 2013
(Ghana) Osei Mawuli^{4}	Hapoel Ashkelon	Maccabi Umm al-Fahm	8–0	15 November 2013
(Nigeria) Olarenwaju Kayode	Maccabi Netanya	Hapoel Rishon LeZion	5–1	18 November 2013
(Israel) Moshe Ben Lulu^{4}	Hapoel Bnei Lod	Maccabi Umm al-Fahm	7–0	27 December 2013

- ^{4} Player scored 4 goals

== Season statistics ==
=== Top scorers ===
Rank	Scorer	Club	Goals
1	(Israel) Shahar Hirsh	Hapoel Afula	20
2	(Ghana) Osei Mawuli	Hapoel Ashkelon	18
3	(Israel) Murad Abu Anza	Hapoel Bnei Lod	15
3	(Israel) Ran Ben Shimon	Hapoel Ramat Gan	15
5	(Israel) Eran Levi	Maccabi Netanya	14
5	(Israel) Maor Peretz	Maccabi Yavne	14

Updated: 14 May 2014
Source: Israel Football Association

=== Scoring ===
- First goal of the season: (Israel) Matan Lutati for Beitar Tel Aviv Ramla against Maccabi Herzliya, 90+3' minute (8 September 2013)
- Most goals in a match by one player: 4 goals –
  - (Ghana) Osei Mawuli for Hapoel Ashkelon against Maccabi Umm al-Fahm (15 November 2013)
  - (Israel) Moshe Ben Lulu for Hapoel Bnei Lod against Maccabi Umm al-Fahm (27 December 2013)

=== Discipline ===
- First yellow card of the season: (Israel) Omer Reps for Maccabi Herzliya against Beitar Tel Aviv Ramla, 45th minute (8 September 2013)
- First red card of the season: (Israel) Maoz Samia for Hapoel Jerusalem against Hapoel Rishon LeZion, 54th minute (8 September 2013)

== See also ==
- 2013–14 Israel State Cup
