= 2016–17 Liga Alef =

Israeli football season

The 2016–17 Liga Alef season was the 8th season as third tier since its re-alignment in 2009 and the 75th season of third-tier football in Israel.

The clubs which were ranked 1st in each division promoted to Liga Leumit. The clubs which were ranked between 2nd to 5th places in each division competed in a promotion play-offs, in which the winners, advanced to the final round against the 14th placed club in Liga Leumit.

At the bottom, the bottom two clubs in each division were all automatically relegated to Liga Bet, whilst the two clubs which were ranked in 14th place in each division, entered a promotion/relegation play-offs.

== Changes from last season ==
=== Team changes ===
- Ironi Nesher and Maccabi Sha'arayim were promoted to Liga Leumit; Maccabi Kiryat Gat and Maccabi Yavne (to South division) were relegated from Liga Leumit.
- Maccabi Sektzia Ma'alot-Tarshiha and Ihud Bnei Majd al-Krum were relegated to Liga Bet from North division, F.C. Tzeirei Kafr Kanna, F.C. Haifa Robi Shapira and F.C. Tira were promoted to the North division from Liga Bet.
- Hapoel Morasha Ramat HaSharon and Bnei Eilat were relegated to Liga Bet from South division; Bnei Jaffa and F.C. Dimona were promoted to the South division from Liga Bet.

== North Division ==
Pos	Team	Pld	W	D	L	GF	GA	GD	Pts	Qualification or relegation
1	Hapoel Hadera	28	19	7	2	58	18	+40	64	Promoted to Liga Leumit
2	F.C. Haifa Robi Shapira	28	16	7	5	51	24	+27	55	Promotion Playoffs
3	Hapoel Iksal	28	15	9	4	49	28	+21	54	Promotion Playoffs
4	Ironi Tiberias	28	12	12	4	34	24	+10	48	Promotion Playoffs
5	Hapoel Beit She'an	28	13	6	9	37	27	+10	45	Promotion Playoffs
6	Hapoel Herzliya	28	11	9	8	38	32	+6	42	
7	Maccabi Ironi Kiryat Ata	28	10	7	11	38	32	+6	37	
8	Hapoel Migdal HaEmek	28	8	7	13	23	30	−7	31	
9	Hapoel Asi Gilboa	28	7	9	12	20	37	−17	30	
10	Maccabi Tzur Shalom	28	7	8	13	34	45	−11	29	
11	F.C. Tira	28	7	8	13	22	35	−13	29	
12	Hapoel Baqa al-Gharbiyye	28	7	7	14	23	55	−32	28	
13	Hapoel Kafr Kanna	28	6	9	13	22	30	−8	27	
14	Maccabi Daliyat al-Karmel	28	6	8	14	31	54	−23	26	Relegation Playoffs
15	Tzeirei Kafr Kanna	28	6	7	15	20	40	−20	25	Relegated to Liga Bet
16	F.C. Karmiel Safed (Note: F.C. Karmiel Safed folded in November 2016 due to financial difficulties.)	0	0	0	0	0	0	0	0	Folded

Updated to match(es) played on 28 April 2017. Source: Liga Alef North IFA (in Hebrew)
Rules for classification: 1) points; 2) goal difference; 3) number of wins; 4) goals scored; 5) head to head; 6)deciding match.

== South Division ==
Pos	Team	Pld	W	D	L	GF	GA	GD	Pts	Qualification or relegation
1	Hapoel Marmorek	30	21	5	4	73	26	+47	68	Promoted to Liga Leumit
2	Sektzia Ness Ziona	30	20	6	4	55	19	+36	66	Promotion Playoffs
3	Hapoel Kfar Shalem	30	16	8	6	58	36	+22	56	Promotion Playoffs
4	Maccabi Yavne	30	16	8	6	42	26	+16	56	Promotion Playoffs
5	F.C. Kafr Qasim	30	15	4	11	41	38	+3	49	Promotion Playoffs
6	Hakoah Amidar Ramat Gan	30	14	5	11	48	45	+3	47	
7	Maccabi Jaffa Kabilio	30	13	7	10	40	30	+10	46	
8	F.C. Dimona	30	13	7	10	42	39	+3	46	
9	Hapoel Bik'at HaYarden	30	9	8	13	37	39	−2	35	
10	Maccabi Kiryat Gat	30	9	6	15	33	43	−10	33	
11	Hapoel Azor	30	9	6	15	25	40	−15	33	
12	Hapoel Hod HaSharon	30	7	12	11	33	48	−15	33	
13	Hapoel Mahane Yehuda	30	8	8	14	28	44	−16	32	
14	Beitar Kfar Saba	30	6	8	16	33	43	−10	26	Relegation Playoffs
15	Bnei Jaffa Ortodoxim	30	6	4	20	32	74	−42	22	Relegated to Liga Bet
16	F.C. Shikun HaMizrah	30	4	6	20	29	59	−30	18	Relegated to Liga Bet

Updated to match(es) played on 28 April 2017. Source: Liga Alef South IFA (in Hebrew)
Rules for classification: 1) points; 2) goal difference; 3) number of wins; 4) goals scored; 5) head to head; 6)deciding match.

== Promotion play-offs ==
=== First round ===
Second and third placed clubs played single match at home against the fourth and fifth placed clubs in their respective regional division.

5 May 2017
15:00 UTC+3

F.C. Haifa Robi Shapira	2–1 (a.e.t.)	Hapoel Beit She'an
Melesa 14'; Buaron 119'	Report	18' Elimelech

Acre Municipal Stadium
Referee: Idan Leiba
5 May 2017
15:00 UTC+3

Hapoel Iksal	1–2	Ironi Tiberias
Naser A Din 41'	Report	18' Hen Yad'an; 83' Tawil

Iksal Stadium
Referee: Tzvika Levi

5 May 2017
15:00 UTC+3

Sektzia Ness Ziona	0–2 (a.e.t.)	F.C. Kafr Qasim
	Report	113' Edelstein; 120' M. Badir

Ness Ziona Stadium
Referee: Shimon Elkabetz
5 May 2017
15:00 UTC+3

Hapoel Kfar Shalem	3–1	Maccabi Yavne
Mazor 35'; Mizrahi 57'; Lubin 60'	Report	18' Farhi

Hatikva Neighborhood Stadium, Tel Aviv
Referee: Ro'I Reinschrieber

=== Second round ===
The winners of the first round played single match at home of the higher ranked club (from each regional division).

12 May 2017
15:00 UTC+3

F.C. Haifa Robi Shapira	2–5	Ironi Tiberias
Melesa 41'; Buaron 85'	Report	7' (pen.), 9', 69' Karakra; 41' Getahon; 90' Saba'a

Acre Municipal Stadium
Referee: Oren Simanian

12 May 2017
15:00 UTC+3

Hapoel Kfar Shalem	1–2	F.C. Kafr Qasim
Mazor 13'	Report	3', 47' Revivo

Hatikva Neighborhood Stadium, Tel Aviv

=== Third round ===
19 May 2017
15:15 UTC+3

Ironi Tiberias	1–3	F.C. Kafr Qasim
Yad'an 27'		11', 33' (pen.) Ben Shimon; 89' Mareev

Netanya Stadium, Netanya
Attendance: 2,500
Referee: Guy Berger

=== Fourth round - promotion/relegation play-offs ===
26 May 2017
16:00 UTC+3

F.C. Kafr Qasim	1 – 1	Hapoel Nazareth Illit
Edelstein 55'	Report (in Hebrew)	Atar 7'

Winter Stadium, Ramat Gan
Referee: Alon Yefet

30 May 2017
15:00 UTC+3

Hapoel Nazareth Illit	2–1 (a.e.t.)	F.C. Kafr Qasim
Atar 64'; Amsis 98'	Report	52' Ben Shimon

Green Stadium, Nazareth Illit
Referee: Erez Papir

Hapoel Nazareth Illit won 3–2 on aggregate and remained in Liga Leumit. F.C. Kafr Qasim remained in Liga Alef.

== Relegation play-offs ==
=== North play-off ===
4 May 2017
19:00 UTC+3

Maccabi Daliyat al-Karmel	2–1	Hapoel Bnei Zalafa
Taha 55'; Azbarga 89'	Report	90+1' Habashi

Ilut Stadium
Referee: Aviad Shiloah

=== South play-off ===
5 May 2017
15:00 UTC+3

Beitar Kfar Saba	2–1	Ironi Or Yehuda
Shani 15'; Hillel 36'	Report	49' Yakir

Ramat Gan Stadium
Referee: Kobi Lehem HaCohen
