= 2015–16 Liga Alef =

Israeli football season

The 2015–16 Liga Alef season saw Ironi Nesher (champions of the North Division) and Maccabi Sha'arayim (champions of the South Division) win the title and promotion to Liga Leumit.

The clubs which were ranked between 2nd to 5th places in each division competed in a promotion play-offs, in which the winners, F.C. Kafr Qasim, advanced to the final round, where they lost 1-3 on aggregate to the 14th placed club in Liga Leumit, Hapoel Jerusalem. Thus, F.C. Kafr Qasim remained in Liga Alef.

At the bottom, the bottom two clubs in each division, Maccabi Sektzia Ma'alot-Tarshiha, Ihud Bnei Majd al-Krum (from North division), Bnei Eilat and Hapoel Morasha Ramat HaSharon (from South division) were all automatically relegated to Liga Bet, whilst the two clubs which were ranked in 14th place in each division, Maccabi Daliyat al-Karmel and Maccabi Ironi Amishav Petah Tikva entered a promotion/relegation play-offs. Maccabi Daliyat al-Karmel prevailing to stay in Liga Alef, while Maccabi Ironi Amishav Petah Tikva were relegated after losing the play-offs.

== Changes from last season ==
=== Team changes ===
- Hapoel Katamon Jerusalem and Hapoel Ashkelon were promoted to Liga Leumit; Ironi Tiberias (to North division) and Hakoah Amidar Ramat Gan (to South division) were relegated from Liga Leumit.
- Beitar Nahariya and Maccabi Umm al-Fahm were relegated to Liga Bet from North division, whilst F.C. Givat Olga folded following a merger with Hapoel Hadera; Hapoel Kafr Kanna, Hapoel Ironi Baqa al-Gharbiyye and Hapoel Iksal were promoted to the North division from Liga Bet.
- Maccabi Be'er Sheva and Maccabi Kiryat Malakhi were relegated to Liga Bet from South division; Hapoel Bik'at HaYarden and Bnei Eilat were promoted to the South division from Liga Bet.

== North Division ==
Pos	Team	Pld	W	D	L	GF	GA	GD	Pts	Promotion or relegation
1	Ironi Nesher (C, P)	30	19	7	4	52	18	+34	64	Promotion to Liga Leumit
2	Hapoel Hadera	30	16	8	6	52	31	+21	56	Promotion play-offs
3	Ironi Tiberias	30	13	12	5	35	20	+15	51	Promotion play-offs
4	Hapoel Herzliya	30	14	7	9	44	29	+15	49	Promotion play-offs
5	Maccabi Ironi Kiryat Ata	30	12	9	9	37	23	+14	45	Promotion play-offs
6	Hapoel Kafr Kanna	30	11	10	9	30	31	−1	43	
7	Hapoel Ironi Baqa al-Gharbiyye	30	9	15	6	33	28	+5	41 (Note: No points or goals were awarded for Maccabi Daliyat al-Karmel - Hapoel Ironi Baqa al-Gharbiyye match, which was abandoned due to brawl after 87 minutes, at 1-1.)	
8	F.C. Karmiel Safed	30	11	6	13	36	43	−7	39	
9	Hapoel Migdal HaEmek	30	10	8	12	33	40	−7	38	
10	Hapoel Beit She'an	30	10	8	12	26	35	−9	38	
11	Hapoel Iksal	30	8	13	9	32	31	+1	37	
12	Hapoel Asi Gilboa	30	8	12	10	34	31	+3	36	
13	Maccabi Tzur Shalom	30	9	9	12	28	39	−11	36	
14	Maccabi Daliyat al-Karmel	30	5	14	11	32	35	−3	28	Relegation play-offs
15	Maccabi Sektzia Ma'alot-Tarshiha (R)	30	7	7	16	25	52	−27	28	Relegation to Liga Bet
16	Ihud Bnei Majd al-Krum (R)	30	3	5	22	15	58	−43	14	Relegation to Liga Bet

Updated to match(es) played on 28 April 2016. Source: The Israel Football Association (in Hebrew)
Rules for classification: 1) points; 2) goal difference; 3) number of goals scored.
(C) Champions; (P) Promoted; (R) Relegated

== South Division ==
Pos	Team	Pld	W	D	L	GF	GA	GD	Pts	Promotion or relegation
1	Maccabi Sha'arayim (C, P)	30	21	4	5	54	19	+35	67	Promotion to Liga Leumit
2	Sektzia Nes Tziona	30	18	5	7	51	24	+27	59	Promotion play-offs
3	Maccabi Kabilio Jaffa	30	14	8	8	42	25	+17	50	Promotion play-offs
4	F.C. Kafr Qasim	30	13	10	7	45	27	+18	49	Promotion play-offs
5	Hapoel Azor	30	14	7	9	42	28	+14	49	Promotion play-offs
6	Hapoel Kfar Shalem	30	15	4	11	49	40	+9	49	
7	Hapoel Marmorek	30	14	6	10	34	26	+8	48	
8	Hapoel Bik'at HaYarden	30	13	5	12	35	39	−4	44	
9	Hapoel Hod HaSharon	30	12	4	14	38	40	−2	40	
10	Hapoel Mahane Yehuda	30	10	8	12	25	28	−3	38	
11	Beitar Kfar Saba	30	10	7	13	35	40	−5	37	
12	F.C. Shikun HaMizrah	30	10	4	16	28	53	−25	34	
13	Hakoah Amidar Ramat Gan	30	8	9	13	26	43	−17	33	
14	Maccabi Amishav Petah Tikva	30	7	10	13	29	43	−14	31	Relegation play-offs
15	Bnei Eilat (R)	30	6	9	15	27	45	−18	27	Relegation to Liga Bet
16	Hapoel Morasha (R)	30	2	6	22	16	64	−48	12	Relegation to Liga Bet

Updated to match(es) played on 28 April 2016. Source: The Israel Football Association (in Hebrew)
Rules for classification: 1) points; 2) goal difference; 3) number of goals scored.
(C) Champions; (P) Promoted; (R) Relegated

== Promotion play-offs ==
=== First round ===
Second and third placed clubs played single match at home against the fourth and fifth placed clubs in their respective regional division.

6 May 2016
15:00 UTC+3

Hapoel Hadera	2 – 1	Maccabi Ironi Kiryat Ata
Megira 10' (o.g.); Elimelech 29'	Report (in Hebrew)	Balilti 48'

Givat Olga Stadium, Hadera
Referee: Liran Liani
6 May 2016
15:00 UTC+3

Ironi Tiberias	2 – 0	Hapoel Herzliya
Elkabetz 10'; Berzik 53'	Report (in Hebrew)

Municipal Stadium, Tiberias
Referee: Sahar Arbeli

6 May 2016
15:00 UTC+3

Sektzia Nes Tziona	1 – 1 (a.e.t.)	Hapoel Azor
Gerassi 9'	Report (in Hebrew)	Hajaj 33'
Penalties
Levy (penalty scored); Sharon (penalty missed); Zohar (penalty missed); Hazom (penalty missed)	1–3	Hajaj (penalty scored); Asher (penalty scored); Ashkenazi (penalty scored)

Ness Ziona Stadium, Ness Ziona
Referee: Menashe Masiah
6 May 2016
15:00 UTC+3

Maccabi Kabilio Jaffa	0 – 0 (a.e.t.)	F.C. Kafr Qasim
	Report (in Hebrew)
Penalties
Tzagai (penalty missed); Sulimanov (penalty missed); Aflalo (penalty missed)	0–3	HaLevy (penalty scored); Danon (penalty scored); Frej (penalty scored)

Hatikva Neighborhood Stadium, Tel Aviv
Referee: Ziv Adler

Hapoel Hadera and Ironi Tiberias (from North division) and F.C. Kafr Qasim and Hapoel Azor (from South division) advanced to the second round.

=== Second round ===
The winners of the first round played single match at home of the higher ranked club (from each regional division).

13 May 2016
15:00 UTC+3

Hapoel Hadera	3 – 0	Ironi Tiberias
Azoulay 38'; Timinhar 58'; Guma 69'	Report (in Hebrew)

Givat Olga Stadium, Hadera
Referee: Roi Reinshreiber

13 May 2016
15:00 UTC+3

F.C. Kafr Qasim	2 – 0	Hapoel Azor
Even 52'; Cohen 56'	Report (in Hebrew)

Winter Stadium, Ramat Gan
Referee: Eli Hacmon

Hapoel Hadera and F.C. Kafr Qasim advanced to the third round.

=== Third round ===
Hapoel Hadera and F.C. Kafr Qasim faced each other for a single match in neutral venue. The winner advanced to the fourth round against the 14th placed club in Liga Leumit.

18 May 2016
17:30 UTC+3

Hapoel Hadera	2 – 2 (a.e.t.)	F.C. Kafr Qasim
Ababa 45'; Azoulay 82'	Report (in Hebrew)	Danon 53'; R. Sarsour 69'
Penalties
Guma (penalty missed); Janah (penalty scored); Zalka (penalty scored); Turgeman (penalty scored); Zabag (penalty scored)	4–5	HaLevy (penalty scored); Danon (penalty scored); Frej (penalty scored); Ma. Sarsour (penalty scored); Even (penalty scored)

Toto Stadium, Herzliya
Referee: Menashe Masiah

F.C. Kafr Qasim advanced to the promotion/relegation play-offs.

=== Fourth round - promotion/relegation play-offs ===
F.C. Kafr Qasim faced the 14th placed in 2015–16 Liga Leumit, Hapoel Jerusalem. The winner on aggregate earned a spot in the 2016–17 Liga Leumit. The matches took place on May 27 and 31, 2016.

27 May 2016
16:00 UTC+3

F.C. Kafr Qasim	0 - 1	Hapoel Jerusalem
	Report (in Hebrew)	I. Cohen 35'

Winter Stadium, Ramat Gan
Referee: Eli Hacmon

31 May 2016
19:00 UTC+3

Hapoel Jerusalem	2 - 1	F.C. Kafr Qasim
G. Cohen 37'; Levy 90' (pen.)	Report (in Hebrew)	Mo. Sarsour 72'

Teddy Stadium, Jerusalem
Referee: Erez Papir

Hapoel Jerusalem won 3–1 on aggregate and remained in Liga Leumit. F.C. Kafr Qasim remained in Liga Alef.

== Relegation play-offs ==
=== North play-off ===
The 14th placed club in Liga Alef North, Maccabi Daliyat al-Karmel, faced the Liga Bet North play-offs winner, Hapoel Umm al-Fahm. The winner earned a spot in the 2016–17 Liga Alef.

13 May 2016
15:00 UTC+3

Hapoel Umm al-Fahm	0 – 1	Maccabi Daliyat al-Karmel
	Report (in Hebrew)	Malasa 52'

Ilut Stadium, Ilut
Referee: Guy Berger

Maccabi Daliyat al-Karmel remained in Liga Alef; Hapoel Umm al-Fahm remained in Liga Bet.

=== South play-off ===
The 14th placed club in Liga Alef South, Maccabi Amishav Petah Tikva, faced the Liga Bet South play-offs winner, F.C. Tira. The winner earned a spot in the 2016–17 Liga Alef.

13 May 2016
15:00 UTC+3

F.C. Tira	1 – 1 (a.e.t.)	Maccabi Amishav Petah Tikva
Mansour 117'	Report (in Hebrew)	Yehudai 120'
Penalties
Sha'ari (penalty missed); Kashoua (penalty scored); Gindiya (penalty scored); Amar (penalty scored)	3–1	Lankri (penalty missed); Arbiv (penalty missed); Zaliat (penalty missed); Hemo (penalty scored)

Toto Stadium, Lod
Referee: Liran Wachsberger

F.C. Tira Promoted to Liga Alef; Maccabi Amishav Petah Tikva relegated to Liga Bet.
