= List of football stadiums in Israel =

The following is a partial list of Israel association football stadiums, ranked in descending order of capacity. The clubs in the list are football clubs, except for rugby union club Tel Aviv Heat.

== Current stadiums ==
#	Image	Stadium	Capacity	City	Home team(s)	Ref
1		Teddy Stadium	31,733	Jerusalem	Beitar Jerusalem, Hapoel Jerusalem	
2		Sammy Ofer Stadium	30,955	Haifa	Hapoel Haifa, Maccabi Haifa	
3		Bloomfield Stadium	29,400	Tel Aviv	Maccabi Tel Aviv, Hapoel Tel Aviv	
4		Turner Stadium	16,126	Be'er Sheva	Hapoel Be'er Sheva	
5		Netanya Stadium	13,610	Netanya	Maccabi Netanya, Hapoel Hadera	
6		HaMoshava Stadium	11,500	Petah Tikva	Hapoel Petah Tikva, Maccabi Petah Tikva	
7		Doha Stadium	8,500	Sakhnin	Bnei Sakhnin	
8		Herzliya Stadium	8,100	Herzliya	Hapoel Herzliya, Maccabi Herzliya	
9		Winter Stadium	8,000	Ramat Gan	Hakoah Amidar Ramat Gan	
10		Yud-Alef Stadium	7,800	Ashdod	F.C. Ashdod	
11		Ramat Gan Stadium	7,000 (permitted seats)	Ramat Gan	Hapoel Ramat Gan	
12		Rehovot Municipal Stadium	6,000	Rehovot	Maccabi Shearayim	
13		Haberfeld Stadium	6,000	Rishon LeZion	Hapoel Rishon LeZion	
14		HaShalom Stadium	5,800	Umm al-Fahm	Hapoel Umm al-Fahm, Maccabi Umm al-Fahm	
15		Levita Stadium	5,800	Kfar Saba	Beitar Kfar Saba, Hapoel Kfar Saba	
16		Kiryat Shmona Municipal Stadium	5,300	Kiryat Shmona	Hapoel Ironi Kiryat Shmona	
17		Sala Stadium	5,250	Ashkelon	Maccabi Ashkelon	
18		Green Stadium	5,200	Nof HaGalil	Hapoel Nof Hagalil	
19		Acre Municipal Stadium	5,000	Acre	Hapoel Acre, Ahi Acre, Maccabi Ironi Acre	
20		Daliyat al-Karmel Municipal Stadium	5,000	Daliyat al-Karmel	Hapoel Daliyat al-Karmel	
21		Ilut Stadium	4,932	Nazareth	Maccabi Ahi Nazareth, Al-Nahda Nazareth	
22		Tiberias Municipal Stadium	4,500	Tiberias	Ironi Tiberias	
23		Grundman Stadium	4,300	Ramat HaSharon	Hapoel Nir Ramat HaSharon	
24		Hebrew University Stadium	4,000	Jerusalem	Agudat Sport Nordia Jerusalem	
25		Ness Ziona Stadium	3,500	Ness Ziona	Sektzia Ness Ziona	
26		Holon Municipal Stadium	3,500	Holon	Otzma Holon	
27		Afula Illit Stadium	3,000	Afula	Hapoel Afula	
28		HaLohamim Stadium	3,000	Holon	Hapoel Tzafririm Holon	
29		Lod Municipal Stadium	3,000	Lod	Hapoel Lod, Hapoel Bnei Lod	
30		Bat Yam Municipal Stadium	2,800	Bat Yam	Beitar Tel Aviv	
31		Hatikva Neighborhood Stadium	2,700	Tel Aviv	Bnei Yehuda Tel Aviv, Hapoel Kfar Shalem	

== See also ==
- List of Asian stadiums by capacity
- List of European stadiums by capacity
- List of association football stadiums by capacity
- List of association football stadiums by country
- List of sports venues by capacity
- List of stadiums by capacity
- Lists of stadiums
