= 2015–16 Liga Leumit =

Liga Leumit
- Season: 2015–16
- Champions: F.C. Ashdod
- Promoted: F.C. Ashdod; Hapoel Ashkelon
- Relegated: Maccabi Yavne; Maccabi Kiryat Gat
- Matches played: 296
- Goals scored: 784 (2.65 per match)
- Top goalscorer: (France) Jordan Faucher (21)
- Biggest home win: Hapoel Ramat Gan 5 - 0 Hapoel Katamon Jerusalem (25 April 2016); Hapoel Nazareth Illit 6 - 1 Maccabi Kiryat Gat (2 May 2016)
- Biggest away win: Hapoel Petah Tikva 0 - 4 Maccabi Yavne (9 November 2015); Hapoel Nazareth Illit 0 - 4 Hapoel Rishon LeZion (18 December 2015); Beitar Tel Aviv Ramla 0 - 4 Hapoel Jerusalem (22 January 2016); Hapoel Rishon LeZion 0 - 4 Hapoel Ashkelon (15 February 2016); Hapoel Afula 0 - 4 Maccabi Yavne (25 April 2016); Maccabi Kiryat Gat 0 - 4 Beitar Tel Aviv Ramla (9 May 2016); Maccabi Yavne 0 - 4 Hapoel Nazareth Illit (13 May 2016); Maccabi Kiryat Gat 0 - 4 Hapoel Rishon LeZion (20 May 2016)
- Highest scoring: Hapoel Ashkelon 5 - 4 Hapoel Petah Tikva (2 May 2016)
- All statistics correct as of 20 May 2016.

The 2015–16 Liga Leumit was the 17th season as second tier since its re-alignment in 1999 and the 74th season of second-tier football in Israel.

A total of sixteen teams were contesting in the league, including eleven sides from the 2014–15 season, the three promoted teams from 2014–15 Liga Alef and the two relegated teams from 2014–15 Israeli Premier League.

== Changes from 2014–15 season ==
=== Team changes ===
Bnei Yehuda Tel Aviv and Hapoel Kfar Saba, were promoted to the 2015–16 Israeli Premier League.

Hapoel Petah Tikva and FC Ashdod were directly relegated to the 2015–16 Liga Leumit after finishing the 2014–15 Israeli Premier League season in the bottom two places.

Hakoah Ramat Gan, and Ironi Tiberias were directly relegated to Liga Alef after finishing in the previous season in last two league places. They were replaced by Hapoel Katamon Jerusalem and Hapoel Ashkelon who finished first their respective 2014–15 Liga Alef.

== Overview ==
=== Stadia and locations ===
Club	Home City	Stadium	Capacity
Beitar Tel Aviv Ramla	Tel Aviv and Ramla	Ramla Municipal Stadium	2,000
F.C. Ashdod	Ashdod	Yud-Alef Stadium	7,800
Hapoel Afula	Afula	Afula Illit Stadium	3,000
Hapoel Ashkelon	Ashkelon	Sala Stadium	5,250
Hapoel Bnei Lod	Lod	Lod Municipal Stadium	3,000
Hapoel Jerusalem	Jerusalem	Teddy Stadium	31,733
Hapoel Katamon Jerusalem	Jerusalem	Teddy Stadium	31,733
Hapoel Nazareth Illit	Nazareth Illit	Green Stadium	4,000
Hapoel Petah Tikva	Petah Tikva	HaMoshava Stadium	11,500
Hapoel Ramat HaSharon	Ramat HaSharon	Grundman Stadium	4,300
Hapoel Ramat Gan	Ramat Gan	Ramat Gan Stadium	13,370
Hapoel Rishon LeZion	Rishon LeZion	Haberfeld Stadium	6,000
Maccabi Ahi Nazareth	Nazareth	Ilut Stadium	4,932
Maccabi Herzliya	Herzliya	Herzliya Municipal Stadium	8,100
Maccabi Kiryat Gat	Kiryat Gat	Sala Stadium^{[B]}	5,250
Maccabi Yavne	Yavne	Ness Ziona Stadium^{[C]}	3,500

^A The club is playing their home games at a neutral venue because their own ground does not meet Premier League requirements.
^B While Kiryat Gat Municipal Stadium is under construction. Maccabi Kiryat Gat will host their home games in Sala Stadium.
^C While Yavne Municipal Stadium is under construction. Maccabi Yavne will host their home games in Ness Ziona Stadium.

== Regular season ==
Pos	Team	Pld	W	D	L	GF	GA	GD	Pts	Qualification
1	Ashdod	30	16	9	5	52	32	+20	57	Qualification for the Promotion playoffs
2	Hapoel Ashkelon	30	13	11	6	50	31	+19	50	Qualification for the Promotion playoffs
3	Hapoel Petah Tikva	30	13	8	9	40	37	+3	47	Qualification for the Promotion playoffs
4	Maccabi Herzliya	30	12	10	8	36	29	+7	46	Qualification for the Promotion playoffs
5	Maccabi Ahi Nazareth	30	13	5	12	34	35	−1	44	Qualification for the Promotion playoffs
6	Hapoel Katamon Jerusalem	30	12	8	10	36	42	−6	44	Qualification for the Promotion playoffs
7	Hapoel Bnei Lod	30	11	10	9	34	30	+4	43	Qualification for the Promotion playoffs
8	Hapoel Ramat Gan	30	10	12	8	40	32	+8	42	Qualification for the Promotion playoffs
9	Beitar Tel Aviv Ramla	30	13	3	14	42	46	−4	42	Qualification for the Relegation playoffs
10	Hapoel Afula	30	10	11	9	43	39	+4	41	Qualification for the Relegation playoffs
11	Hapoel Rishon LeZion	30	11	8	11	42	43	−1	41	Qualification for the Relegation playoffs
12	Hapoel Ramat HaSharon	30	10	10	10	43	38	+5	40	Qualification for the Relegation playoffs
13	Maccabi Yavne	30	8	9	13	37	41	−4	33	Qualification for the Relegation playoffs
14	Hapoel Jerusalem	30	7	10	13	26	37	−11	31	Qualification for the Relegation playoffs
15	Hapoel Nazareth Illit	30	6	10	14	26	40	−14	28	Qualification for the Relegation playoffs
16	Maccabi Kiryat Gat	30	3	10	17	18	47	−29	19	Qualification for the Relegation playoffs

Source: Israel Football Association
Rules for classification: 1. points; 2. goal difference; 3. matches won; 4. goals scored; 5. head-to-head; 6. decision match.
Winners of 2015–16 Israel State Cup qualify for the second qualifying round of the UEFA Europa League.

== Playoffs ==
=== Top playoff ===
Pos	Team	Pld	W	D	L	GF	GA	GD	Pts	Promotion
1	Ashdod (P)	37	19	13	5	66	38	+28	70	Promoted to Israeli Premier League
2	Hapoel Ashkelon (P)	37	16	14	7	62	40	+22	62	Promoted to Israeli Premier League
3	Hapoel Ramat Gan	37	14	14	9	56	38	+18	56	
4	Hapoel Katamon Jerusalem	37	15	11	11	44	49	−5	56	
5	Maccabi Herzliya	37	14	13	10	50	43	+7	55	
6	Hapoel Petah Tikva	37	13	13	11	54	55	−1	52	
7	Maccabi Ahi Nazareth	37	15	6	16	40	49	−9	51	
8	Hapoel Bnei Lod	37	11	11	15	36	42	−6	44	

Source: Israel Football Association
Rules for classification: 1. points; 2. goal difference; 3. matches won; 4. goals scored; 5. head-to-head; 6. decision match
(P) Promoted

=== Bottom playoff ===
Pos	Team	Pld	W	D	L	GF	GA	GD	Pts	Relegation
9	Beitar Tel Aviv Ramla	37	19	4	14	60	50	+10	61	
10	Hapoel Ramat HaSharon	37	13	11	13	57	49	+8	50	
11	Hapoel Afula	37	13	11	13	53	53	0	50	
12	Hapoel Rishon LeZion	37	13	9	15	51	53	−2	48	
13	Hapoel Nazareth Illit	37	11	11	15	44	47	−3	44	
14	Hapoel Jerusalem (O)	37	9	13	15	39	50	−11	40	Qualification for the relegation play-offs
15	Maccabi Yavne (R)	37	9	9	19	44	58	−14	36	Relegated to Liga Alef
16	Maccabi Kiryat Gat (R)	37	5	11	21	28	70	−42	26	Relegated to Liga Alef

Source: Israel Football Association
Rules for classification: 1. points; 2. goal difference; 3. matches won; 4. goals scored; 5. head-to-head; 6. decision match
(O) Play-off winners; (R) Relegated

== Relegation playoff ==
=== Relegation playoff ===
The 14th-placed Hapoel Jerusalem faced 2015–16 Liga Alef promotion play-offs winner, F.C. Kafr Qasim. The matches took place on May 27 and 31, 2016.

27 May 2016
16:00 UTC+3

F.C. Kafr Qasim	0 - 1	Hapoel Jerusalem
	Report (in Hebrew)	I. Cohen 35'

Winter Stadium, Ramat Gan
Referee: Eli Hacmon

31 May 2016
19:00 UTC+3

Hapoel Jerusalem	2 - 1	F.C. Kafr Qasim
G. Cohen 37'; Levy 90' (pen.)	Report (in Hebrew)	Mo. Sarsour 72'

Teddy Stadium, Jerusalem
Referee: Erez Papir

Hapoel Jerusalem won 3–1 on aggregate and remained in Liga Leumit. F.C. Kafr Qasim remained in Liga Alef.

== Season statistics ==
=== Scoring ===
As of matches played on 20 May 2016.

Rank	Scorer	Club	Goals
1	(France) Jordan Faucher	Maccabi Herzliya	21
2	(Bulgaria) Miroslav Antonov	Maccabi Yavne	16
2	(Ivory Coast) Kpéhi Brossou	Hapoel Ramat Gan	16
2	(Israel) Idan Shriki	Hapoel Ashkelon	16
5	(Israel) Ben Azubel	Hapoel Petah Tikva	15
6	(Israel) Or Inbrom	F.C. Ashdod	14
7	(Israel) Ya'akov Berihon	Hapoel Rishon LeZion	13
7	(Serbia) Branko Mihajlović	Hapoel Petah Tikva	13
7	(Israel) Rotem Shmul	Beitar Tel Aviv Ramla	13
7	(Israel) Yossi Shivhon	Hapoel Ramat HaSharon	13

Source: Israel Football Association

=== Discipline ===
- Most yellow cards: 13
  - Salem Abu Siam (Hapoel Bnei Lod)
  - Daniel Solomon (Maccabi Kiryat Gat)
- Most red cards: 3
  - Israel Rosh (Hapoel Ramat Gan)
  - Uri Peso (Hapoel Petah Tikva)
  - Ryan Adeleye (Hapoel Jerusalem)

== See also ==
- 2015–16 Israel State Cup
