= 2016–17 Toto Cup Leumit =

Tournament details
- Country: Israel
- Teams: 16

Final positions
- Champions: Maccabi Sha'arayim
- Runners-up: Hapoel Ramat Gan

Tournament statistics
- Matches played: 22
- Goals scored: 55 (2.5 per match)
- Top goal scorer: Ali El-Khatib (4)

The 2016–17 Toto Cup Leumit was the 27th season of the second tier League Cup (as a separate competition) since its introduction. It was held in two stages. First, sixteen Liga Leumit teams were divided into four regionalized groups, with the winners and runners-up advanced to the quarter-finals. Quarter-finals, semi-finals and the final were held as one-legged matches.

The defending cup holders were Hapoel Ashkelon, having won the cup on its previous edition.

In the final, played on 30 November 2016, Maccabi Sha'arayim defeated Hapoel Ramat Gan 2–1.

== Group stage ==
Groups were allocated according to geographic distribution of the clubs. The groups were announced by the IFA on took place on 18 July 2016.

The matches are due to be played from 1 August.

=== Tiebreakers ===
If two or more teams are equal on points on completion of the group matches, the following criteria are applied to determine the rankings.

1. Superior goal difference
2. Higher number of victories achieved
3. Higher number of goals scored
4. Higher number of points obtained in the group matches played among the teams in question
5. Superior goal difference from the group matches played among the teams in question
6. Higher number of victories achieved in the group matches played among the teams in question
7. Higher number of goals scored in the group matches played among the teams in question
8. A deciding match, if needed to set which team qualifies to the quarter-finals.

=== Group A ===
Pos	Team	Pld	W	D	L	GF	GA	GD	Pts	MAN	HAF	HAC	HNI
1	Maccabi Ahi Nazareth (A)	3	2	1	0	5	3	+2	7		3–2	0–0	
2	Hapoel Afula (A)	3	1	1	1	5	4	+1	4			1–2	
3	Hapoel Acre	3	1	1	1	3	3	0	4	1–2			
4	Hapoel Nazareth Illit	3	0	1	2	4	7	−3	1	0–0		2–4	

Source: football.org.il (in Hebrew)
Rules for classification: 1st points; 2nd goal difference; 3rd matches won; 4th goals scored; 5th head-to-head; 6th decision match
(A) Advanced to the quarterfinals

=== Group B ===
Pos	Team	Pld	W	D	L	GF	GA	GD	Pts	MNE	HRH	INE	MHE
1	Maccabi Netanya (A)	3	1	2	0	4	3	+1	5				2–2
2	Hapoel Ramat HaSharon (A)	3	1	1	1	6	5	+1	4	1–1		0–1	
3	Ironi Nesher	3	1	1	1	3	3	0	4	0–1			2–2
4	Maccabi Herzliya	3	0	2	1	7	9	−2	2		3–5		

Source: football.org.il (in Hebrew)
Rules for classification: 1st points; 2nd goal difference; 3rd matches won; 4th goals scored; 5th head-to-head; 6th decision match
(A) Advanced to the quarterfinals

=== Group C ===
Pos	Team	Pld	W	D	L	GF	GA	GD	Pts	HBL	HRG	BTR	HPT
1	Hapoel Bnei Lod (A)	3	3	0	0	6	1	+5	9			1–0	3–1
2	Hapoel Ramat Gan (A)	3	2	0	1	6	6	0	6	0–2			
3	Beitar Tel Aviv Ramla	3	1	0	2	7	7	0	3		2–3		5–3
4	Hapoel Petah Tikva	3	0	0	3	6	11	−5	0				

Source: football.org.il (in Hebrew)
Rules for classification: 1st points; 2nd goal difference; 3rd matches won; 4th goals scored; 5th head-to-head; 6th decision match
(A) Advanced to the quarterfinals

=== Group D ===
Pos	Team	Pld	W	D	L	GF	GA	GD	Pts	MSH	HJE	HRL	HKN
1	Maccabi Sha'arayim (A)	3	2	1	0	5	2	+3	7		1–0		3–1
2	Hapoel Jerusalem (A)	3	1	1	1	3	3	0	4			1–0	
3	Hapoel Rishon LeZion	3	0	2	1	2	3	−1	2	1–1			
4	Hapoel Katamon Jerusalem	3	0	2	1	4	6	−2	2		2–2	1–1	

Source: football.org.il (in Hebrew)
Rules for classification: 1st points; 2nd goal difference; 3rd matches won; 4th goals scored; 5th head-to-head; 6th decision match
(A) Advanced to the quarterfinals

== Knockout rounds ==
=== Quarter-finals ===
25 October 2016	Maccabi Ahi Nazareth	3–1	Hapoel Bnei Lod	Nazareth
19:00	A. Khatib 12', 90' (pen.); M. Khativ 83'	Report	29' Sheikh Yusef	Stadium: Ilut Stadium; Referee: Shilo'ach Aviad Yahav-Hai

25 October 2016	Maccabi Sha'arayim	2–2 (a.e.t.) (8–7 p)	Hapoel Afula	Ness Ziona
19:00	Itzhak 62'; Danin 65'	Report	89' Shawat; 90+5' Handy	Stadium: Ness Ziona Stadium; Referee: Shalev Sasson

26 October 2016	Maccabi Netanya	0–1	Hapoel Ramat HaSharon	Netanya
20:00		Report	90+4' Ostvind	Stadium: Netanya Stadium; Referee: Na'il Uda

25 October 2016	Hapoel Jerusalem	1–2	Hapoel Ramat Gan	Lod
19:00	A. Levy 18' (pen.)	Report	53' (o.g.) Lagrisi; 90+1' Hasidim	Stadium: Municipal Stadium; Referee: Rifaat al-Hamula

=== Semi-finals ===
8 November 2016	Hapoel Ramat HaSharon	1–2	Maccabi Sha'arayim	Lod
19:00	Ostvind 16'	Report	10' Shalom; 90+4' Itzhak	Stadium: Municipal Stadium; Referee: As'ad Jabarin

8 November 2016	Hapoel Ramat Gan	0–0 (a.e.t.) (7–6 p)	Maccabi Ahi Nazareth	Ramat HaSharon
19:00		Report		Stadium: Grundman Stadium; Referee: David Fuchsmann
	Penalties
	Berkovic (penalty scored); Cohen (penalty missed); Rosh (penalty scored); Sharon (penalty scored); Barshazki (penalty scored); Tiram (penalty scored); Pshehazkey (penalty scored); Hasidim (penalty scored)		(penalty scored) Hutba; (penalty missed) Dabour; (penalty scored) A. Khatib; (penalty scored) Sapir; (penalty scored) Sliman; (penalty scored) Paty; (penalty scored) Jaber; (penalty missed) Martin

== Final ==
30 November 2016	Maccabi Sha'arayim	2–1 (a.e.t.)	Hapoel Ramat Gan	Lod
19:00	Oded Gavish 101'; Gil Itzhak 110'	Report	105' David Tiram	Stadium: Lod Municipal Stadium; Referee: Shilo'ach Aviad Yahav-Hai

== See also ==
- 2016–17 Toto Cup Al
- 2016–17 Liga Leumit
- 2016–17 Israel State Cup
