= Sharabi (disambiguation) =

Sharabi is a Jewish surname.

Sharabi or Sharaabi (lit. 'Alcoholic') may also refer to these Indian films:

- Sharabi (1964 film), 1964 Indian Hindi-language drama film by Raj Rishi
- Sharaabi, 1984 Indian Hindi-language comedy drama film by Prakash Mehra

== See also ==
- al-Sharabi, an Arabic surname
- Sharab (disambiguation)
