= 2008–09 Toto Cup Artzit =

Toto Cup Artzit
- Season: 2008–09
- Champions: Hapoel Marmorek

The 2008–09 Toto Cup Artzit was the 10th time the cup was being contested. This was the last edition of the third division Toto Cup, as Liga Artzit was dissolved at the end of the season.

The final was played at Haberfeld Stadium in Rishon LeZion on 17 November 2008. The winners were Marmorek, who had beaten Hapoel Ashkelon 1–0 in the final.

== Format change ==
For this season, the 12 Liga Artzit clubs were divided into three groups with four clubs in each group. The three group winners, together with the best runner-up advanced to the semi-finals.

== Group stage ==
=== Group A ===
Pos	Team	Pld	W	D	L	GF	GA	GD	Pts	HRL	BST	MTC	HBJ
1	Hapoel Rishon LeZion (A)	6	4	1	1	10	5	+5	13	—	1–1	3–0	0–2 (Note: The match between Hapoel Rishon LeZion and Hapoel Bnei Jadeidi was awarded to Jadeidi, as Rishon LeZion fielded an ineligible player.)
2	Beitar Shimshon Tel Aviv	6	3	1	2	13	7	+6	10	1–3	—	3–2	7–0
3	Maccabi Ironi Tirat HaCarmel	6	3	0	3	10	11	−1	9	1–2	1–0	—	4–3
4	Hapoel Bnei Jadeidi	6	1	0	5	5	15	−10	3	0–1	0–1	0–2	—

Source: Toto Cup Artzit 2008/2009 IFA (in Hebrew)
Rules for classification: 1st points; 2nd goal difference; 3rd matches won; 4th goals scored; 5th head-to-head; 6th decision match
(A) Advanced to the Semifinals

=== Group B ===
Pos	Team	Pld	W	D	L	GF	GA	GD	Pts	HBT	SNT	IBY	HUF
1	Hapoel Bnei Tamra (A)	6	4	1	1	10	5	+5	13	—	3–2	1–1	1–2
2	Sektzia Nes Tziona	6	3	1	2	11	7	+4	10	0–2	—	2–1	0–0
3	Ironi Bat Yam	6	1	2	3	6	9	−3	5	0–1	0–3	—	1–1
4	Hapoel Umm al-Fahm	6	1	2	3	5	11	−6	5	0–2 (Note: Hapoel Umm al-Fahm failed to show to the match against Hapoel Bnei Tamra)	1–4	1–3	—

Source: Toto Cup Artzit 2008/2009 IFA (in Hebrew)
Rules for classification: 1st points; 2nd goal difference; 3rd matches won; 4th goals scored; 5th head-to-head; 6th decision match
(A) Advanced to the Semifinals

=== Group C ===
Pos	Team	Pld	W	D	L	GF	GA	GD	Pts	HMK	HAS	HNI	MKK
1	Hapoel Marmorek (A)	6	4	1	1	9	3	+6	13	—	2–0	0–0	4–0
2	Hapoel Ashkelon (A)	6	4	1	1	8	3	+5	13	2–0	—	2–0	2–0
3	Hapoel Nazareth Illit	6	1	3	2	6	8	−2	6	0–1	1–1	—	3–2
4	Maccabi Kafr Kanna	6	0	1	5	5	14	−9	1	1–2	0–1	2–2	—

Source: Toto Cup Artzit 2008/2009 IFA (in Hebrew)
Rules for classification: 1st points; 2nd goal difference; 3rd matches won; 4th goals scored; 5th head-to-head; 6th decision match
(A) Advanced to the Semifinals

== Semifinals ==
28 October 2008
14:30

Hapoel Ashkelon	2–1	Hapoel Bnei Tamra
Barda 1', 31'	Report	Abu Yunes 61'

Winter Stadium
Referee: Eli Wahabi

28 October 2008
19:00

Hapoel Marmorek	2–0	Hapoel Rishon LeZion
Sharabi 42'; Hovgan 90'	Report

Winter Stadium
Referee: Nissim Bitton

== Final ==
17 November 2008
17:00

Hapoel Ashkelon	0–1	Hapoel Marmorek
	Report	Barabi 90'

Haberfeld Stadium
Referee: Rami Ben Itzhak

== See also ==
- Toto Cup
- 2008–09 Liga Artzit
- 2008–09 in Israeli football
