= 2014–15 Liga Gimel =

Israeli football season

The 2014–15 Liga Gimel season saw 110 clubs competing in 8 regional divisions for promotion to Liga Bet.

Beitar Kafr Kanna (Upper Galilee), F.C. Tzeirei Kafr Kanna (Lower Galilee), Ihud Bnei Baqa (Jezreel), F.C. Haifa Ruby Shapira (Samaria), Hapoel Pardesiya (Sharon), Ironi Beit Dagan (Tel Aviv), F.C. Holon Yaniv (Central) and Maccabi Segev Shalom (South) all won their respective divisions and were promoted to Liga Bet.

== Upper Galilee Division ==
Pos	Team	Pld	W	D	L	GF	GA	GD	Pts	Promotion
1	Beitar Kafr Kanna (C, P)	24	20	3	1	82	18	+64	63	Promotion to Liga Bet
2	Maccabi Bnei Nahf (P)	24	19	3	2	74	24	+50	60	Promotion to Liga Bet
3	Hapoel Bnei Rameh	24	17	1	6	82	33	+49	52	
4	Hapoel Nahariya	24	16	1	7	74	56	+18	49	
5	F.C. Aramshe Danun	24	15	2	7	49	27	+22	47	
6	Hapoel Bnei Hurfeish	24	11	1	12	43	55	−12	34	
7	Hapoel Bnei Peki'in	24	10	4	10	51	46	+5	34	
8	F.C. Julis	23	9	1	13	42	55	−13	28 (Note: The match between Hapoel Merom HaGalil and F.C. Julis wasn't played and a score wasn't set for this match.)	
9	F.C. Hatzor HaGlilit	24	7	3	14	50	66	−16	24	
10	Maccabi Ahva Yarka	24	7	2	15	50	74	−24	23	
11	Hapoel Jatt Yanuh HaGlilit	24	6	1	17	26	62	−36	19	
12	Hapoel Merom HaGalil	23	3	3	17	29	66	−37	12	
13	Bnei Kafr Yasif	24	2	1	21	20	90	−70	7	

Source: IFA (in Hebrew)
Rules for classification: 1st points; 2nd matches won; 3rd head-to-head; 4th deciding match
(C) Champions; (P) Promoted

== Lower Galilee Division ==
Pos	Team	Pld	W	D	L	GF	GA	GD	Pts	Promotion
1	F.C. Tzeirei Kafr Kanna (C, P)	22	20	0	2	76	8	+68	60	Promotion to Liga Bet
2	Ahi Bir al-Maksur (P)	22	17	3	2	72	22	+50	54	Promotion to Liga Bet
3	F.C. Tzeirei Tamra	22	15	2	5	66	24	+42	46 (Note: F.C. Tzeirei Tamra had one point deducted.)	
4	Maccabi Tzeirei Shefa-'Amr	22	13	4	5	37	23	+14	43	
5	Maccabi Ironi Tamra	22	9	4	9	36	38	−2	31	
6	Maccabi Kafr Manda	22	8	4	10	41	37	+4	28	
7	F.C. Halat el-Sharif	22	5	10	7	24	39	−15	25	
8	F.C. Kfar Kama	22	6	4	12	43	50	−7	22	
9	Ironi Bnei Sha'ab	22	6	3	13	34	51	−17	21	
10	Maccabi Bnei Deir Hanna	22	4	5	13	33	80	−47	17	
11	Hapoel Bnei Deir al-Asad	22	4	2	16	31	67	−36	14	
12	F.C. Tzeirei Ibtin Khawaled	22	3	3	16	23	77	−54	12	
–	F.C. Bnei Arraba	0	0	0	0	0	0	0	0 (Note: F.C. Bnei Arraba forfeited their place in the league before the league started.)	
–	F.C. Tzeirei Bir al-Maksur	0	0	0	0	0	0	0	0 (Note: F.C. Tzeirei Bir al-Maksur withdrew from the league after the 17th round, and all its matches were annulled.)	

Source: IFA (in Hebrew)
Rules for classification: 1st points; 2nd matches won; 3rd head-to-head; 4th deciding match
(C) Champions; (P) Promoted

== Jezreel Division ==
Pos	Team	Pld	W	D	L	GF	GA	GD	Pts	Promotion
1	Ihud Bnei Baqa (C, P)	22	17	2	3	88	15	+73	53 (Note: Bnei Baqa ahead on head-to-head record; Bnei Baqa-Bnei Zalafa 4–1, Bnei Zalafa-Bnei Baqa 2–0)	Promotion to Liga Bet
2	Hapoel Bnei Zalafa (P)	22	17	2	3	65	16	+49	53	Promotion to Liga Bet
3	Maccabi Isfiya	22	16	4	2	64	19	+45	52	
4	Hapoel Bnei Ar'ara 'Ara	22	15	0	7	53	27	+26	45	
5	F.C. Nazareth Illit Hanan Ohayon	22	13	4	5	52	28	+24	43	
6	Beitar Afula	22	12	2	8	56	38	+18	38	
7	Beitar Umm al-Fahm	22	8	3	11	30	43	−13	25 (Note: Beitar Umm al-Fahm had two points deducted.)	
8	Hapoel Bnei Musmus	22	7	1	14	28	50	−22	22	
9	Hapoel al-Ittihad Nazareth	22	6	2	14	37	48	−11	20	
10	Hapoel Bnei Fureidis	22	4	2	16	18	66	−48	14	
11	Beitar Ein Mahil	22	3	2	17	17	78	−61	11	
12	Beitar al-Amal Nazareth	22	1	2	19	22	102	−80	5	
-	Bnei Umm al-Fahm	0	0	0	0	0	0	0	0 (Note: Bnei Umm al-Fahm forfeited their place in the league before the league started.)	
-	Hapoel Ka'abiyye	0	0	0	0	0	0	0	0 (Note: After failing to appear to two matches, Hapoel Ka'abiyye was dismissed from the league and its matches were annulled.)	
-	Hapoel Bnei Nazareth	0	0	0	0	0	0	0	0 (Note: On 6 January 2015 Hapoel Bnei Nazareth announced it is stopping its activities and withdrew from the league. All the club's matches up to that point were annulled. Prior to the withdrawal, the club had two points deducted.)	

Source: IFA (in Hebrew)
Rules for classification: 1st points; 2nd matches won; 3rd head-to-head; 4th deciding match
(C) Champions; (P) Promoted

== Samaria Division ==
Pos	Team	Pld	W	D	L	GF	GA	GD	Pts	Promotion
1	F.C. Haifa Ruby Shapira (C, P)	26	24	2	0	109	8	+101	74	Promotion to Liga Bet
2	Beitar Pardes Hanna	26	18	5	3	70	24	+46	59 (Note: Pardes Hanna ahead on head-to-head record; Pardes Hanna-Hapoel Tirat HaCarmel 1–0, Hapoel Tirat HaCarmel-Pardes Hanna 1–1)	
3	Hapoel Tirat HaCarmel	26	18	5	3	76	25	+51	59	
4	F.C. Hapoel Kiryat Yam	26	16	7	3	86	36	+50	55	
5	Maccabi Ironi Tirat HaCarmel	26	15	3	8	59	40	+19	48	
6	Maccabi Ironi Barta'a	26	13	3	10	57	48	+9	42	
7	Hapoel Ahva Haifa	26	12	3	11	44	46	−2	39	
8	Hapoel Ihud Bnei Jatt	26	7	9	10	32	50	−18	30	
9	Hapoel Isfiya	26	9	1	16	49	71	−22	28	
10	Hapoel Bnei Jisr az-Zarqa	26	8	4	14	38	64	−26	28	
11	Hapoel Ironi Or Akiva	26	7	0	19	35	67	−32	21	
12	Maccabi Neve Sha'anan	26	4	7	15	33	68	−35	19	
13	Beitar Hadera	26	2	3	21	35	102	−67	9	
14	Hapoel Halissa	26	1	4	21	28	102	−74	7	

Source: IFA (in Hebrew)
Rules for classification: 1st points; 2nd matches won; 3rd head-to-head; 4th deciding match
(C) Champions; (P) Promoted

== Sharon Division ==
Pos	Team	Pld	W	D	L	GF	GA	GD	Pts	Promotion
1	Hapoel Pardesiya (C, P)	24	18	4	2	79	19	+60	58	Promotion to Liga Bet
2	Beitar Ironi Ariel	24	17	4	3	53	14	+39	55	
3	Maccabi HaSharon Netanya	24	17	3	4	70	28	+42	54	
4	Shimshon Kafr Qasim	24	16	3	5	53	34	+19	51	
5	Hapoel Kafr Bara	24	14	2	8	44	32	+12	44	
6	F.C. Bnei Qalansawe	24	13	1	10	51	41	+10	40	
7	Hapoel Aliyah Kfar Saba	24	11	5	8	46	31	+15	38	
8	F.C. Netanya	24	11	2	11	42	48	−6	35	
9	Beitar Tubruk	24	10	1	13	40	47	−7	31	
10	Shimshon Bnei Tayibe	24	6	1	17	38	59	−21	19	
11	Hapoel Oranit	24	3	2	19	31	86	−55	11	
12	Hapoel Jaljulia	24	3	1	20	28	73	−45	10	
13	F.C. Kafr Qasim Nibrass	24	1	3	20	21	84	−63	5 (Note: F.C. Kafr Qasim Nibrass had one point deducted.)	

Source: IFA (in Hebrew)
Rules for classification: 1st points; 2nd matches won; 3rd head-to-head; 4th deciding match
(C) Champions; (P) Promoted

== Tel Aviv Division ==
Pos	Team	Pld	W	D	L	GF	GA	GD	Pts	Qualification
1	Ironi Beit Dagan (O, P)	28	21	4	3	87	37	+50	67 (Note: As Hapoel Neve Golan and Ironi Beit Dagan tied on head-to-head record (Neve Golan-Beit Dagan 1–1, Beit Dagan-Neve Golan 1–1), the teams played a deciding match, in which Beit Dagan won 3–2.)	deciding match
1	Hapoel Neve Golan (Q)	28	21	4	3	125	44	+81	67	deciding match
3	Hapoel Abirei Bat Yam	28	21	1	6	111	42	+69	64	
4	Elitzur Jaffa Tel Aviv	28	18	5	5	82	44	+38	59	
5	Hapoel Kiryat Shalom	28	17	4	7	87	40	+47	55	
6	Bnei Yehud	28	17	4	7	82	46	+36	55	
7	Shikun Vatikim Ramat Gan	28	13	6	9	88	47	+41	45	
8	Maccabi HaShikma Hen	28	12	3	13	86	80	+6	39	
9	F.C. Mahanaim Ramat Gan	28	10	4	14	63	64	−1	34	
10	Beitar Ezra	28	8	5	15	55	85	−30	29 (Note: Beitar Ezra ahead on head-to-head record; Ironi Or Yehuda-Beitar Ezra 3–1, Beitar Ezra-Ironi Or Yehuda 8–3)	
11	Maccabi Ironi Or Yehuda	28	8	5	15	45	81	−36	29	
12	Maccabi Spartak Ramat Gan	28	7	5	16	53	82	−29	26	
13	Beitar Jaffa	28	6	3	19	57	89	−32	21	
14	Maccabi Pardes Katz	28	2	2	24	53	154	−101	8	
15	Elitzur Yehud	28	1	1	26	20	159	−139	4	
–	Brit Sport Ma'of	0	0	0	0	0	0	0	0 (Note: Brit Sport Ma'of withdrew from the league after the 14th round, and all its matches were annulled.)	

Source: IFA (in Hebrew)
Rules for classification: 1st points; 2nd matches won; 3rd head-to-head; 4th deciding match
(O) Play-off winners; (P) Promoted; (Q) Qualified for the phase indicated

== Central Division ==
Pos	Team	Pld	W	D	L	GF	GA	GD	Pts	Promotion
1	F.C. Holon Yaniv (C, P)	26	23	2	1	86	11	+75	71	Promotion to Liga Bet
2	Hapoel F.C. Hevel Modi'in	26	21	3	2	117	30	+87	66	
3	Nordia Jerusalem	26	19	4	3	103	22	+81	61	
4	Shimshon Tel Aviv	26	15	4	7	85	38	+47	49	
5	Hapoel Ironi Gedera	26	14	6	6	74	35	+39	48	
6	Maccabi Kiryat Ekron	26	14	5	7	80	37	+43	47	
7	Ironi Lod	26	11	5	10	77	65	+12	38	
8	Hapoel Tirat Shalom	26	8	3	15	38	69	−31	27 (Note: Hapoel Tirat Shalom and Maccabi Rehovot were placed ahead of Hapoel Mevaseret Zion based on matches won. Hapoel Tirat Shalom ahead on head-to-head record; Tirat Shalom-Mac. Rehovot 2–1, Mac. Rehovot-Tirat Shalom 2–2)	
9	Maccabi Rehovot	26	8	3	15	42	64	−22	27	
10	Hapoel Mevaseret Zion	26	7	6	13	47	75	−28	27	
11	Hapoel Matzliah	26	7	4	15	43	64	−21	25	
12	Hapoel Antonio Ortodoxim Jaffa	26	4	2	20	30	99	−69	14	
13	Hapoel Ramla	26	4	0	22	34	144	−110	12	
14	F.C. Rishon LeZion	26	3	1	22	47	150	−103	10	

Source: IFA (in Hebrew)
Rules for classification: 1st points; 2nd matches won; 3rd head-to-head; 4th deciding match
(C) Champions; (P) Promoted

== South Division ==
Pos	Team	Pld	W	D	L	GF	GA	GD	Pts	Promotion
1	Maccabi Segev Shalom (C, P)	20	17	1	2	83	17	+66	52	Promotion to Liga Bet
2	Bnei al-Salam Rahat	20	16	2	2	44	11	+33	50	
3	F.C. Hapoel Yeruham	20	16	1	3	65	15	+50	49	
4	Maccabi Ironi Hura	20	11	2	7	52	41	+11	35	
5	Hapoel Tel Sheva	20	9	3	8	44	24	+20	29 (Note: Hapoel Tel Sheva had 1 point deducted)	
6	F.C. Be'er Sheva Haim Levy	20	9	2	9	48	45	+3	28 (Note: F.C. Be'er Sheva had 1 point deducted)	
7	Maccabi Ironi Sderot	20	8	3	9	24	33	−9	27	
8	F.C. Tzeirei al-Hoshla	20	7	3	10	37	52	−15	24	
9	Elitzur Ironi Yehuda	20	3	1	16	23	63	−40	10	
10	Hapoel Tzeirei al-Mahdi	20	2	3	15	22	71	−49	9	
11	F.C. Ironi Kuseife	20	0	3	17	13	83	−70	−1 (Note: Ironi Kuseife had 4 points deducted)	

Source: IFA (in Hebrew)
Rules for classification: 1st points; 2nd matches won; 3rd head-to-head; 4th deciding match
(C) Champions; (P) Promoted
