= Sharabi =

Sharabi (Hebrew: שרעבי) is a Jewish toponymic surname. It is common among the Yemenite Jews and originates from the Shar'ab as-Salam district, Yemen, literally meaning "a person from Shar'ab". Notable people with the surname include:

- Adir Sharabi (born 1977), Israeli footballer
- Boaz Sharabi (born 1947), Israeli singer
- D. J. Sharabi (born 1992), American-Israeli basketball player
- Eli Sharabi (born 1972), Israeli former hostage
- Guy Sharabi (born 1969), Israeli footballer
- Hisham Sharabi (1927–2005), Palestinian historian and writer
- Mordechai Sharabi (1908–1984), Yemenite rabbi
- Shalom Sharabi (1720–1777), Yemenite rabbi
- Shalom Sharabi (Shabak) (born 1953), former Israel Security Agency officer
- Shoshana Sharabi (1950–2018), Israeli Paralympic athlete
- Yisrael Yeshayahu Sharabi (1908–1979), Israeli politician
- Yitzhak Mizrahi Sharabi (died 1803), Yemenite rabbi

== Fictional characters ==
- Sharabi family in The Cops (Israeli TV series)

== See also ==
- al-Sharabi
