= Sharab =

Sharab may refer to:

- the Arabic word for syrup
- Sharab Shiraz, wine from Shiraz in Iran
- Shar'ab as-Salam District, a district in Yemen
- Lubsan Sharab Tepkin (1875-1941?), Tibetan Buddhist priest

== See also ==
- Sharabi (disambiguation)
