= 2015–16 Liga Bet =

Israeli football season

The 2015–16 Liga Bet season is the 60th season of fourth tier football in Israel.

League matches began on 2 October 2015 and ended on 19 April 2016, followed by promotion and relegation play-offs.

Tzeirei Kafr Kanna (champions of the North A division), F.C Haifa Robi Shapira (champions of the North B division), F.C. Bnei Jaffa Ortodoxim (champions of the South A division) and F.C. Dimona (champions of the South B division) won their divisional titles and promotion to Liga Alef.

The clubs ranked 2nd to 5th in each division entered a promotion play-off, at the end of which, Hapoel Umm al-Fahm (from the North section) and F.C. Tira (from the South section) met the teams ranked 14th in Liga Alef. F.C. Tira won their tie and was promoted to Liga Alef as well, while Hapoel Umm al-Fahm lost and remained in Liga Bet.

At the bottom, F.C. Pardes Hanna-Karkur (from North B division), Ironi Beit Dagan (from South A division) and Hapoel Rahat (from South B division) were automatically relegated to Liga Gimel. Hapoel Bnei Maghar (from North A division) folded during the season, leaving their respective divisions with 15 teams.

The clubs ranked 12th to 15th in each division entered a relegation play-off, at the end of which Ahi Bir al-Maksur (from North A division), Ihud Bnei Baqa (from North B division), Hapoel Tzafririm Holon (from South A division) and Hapoel Merhavim (from South B division) dropped to Liga Gimel as well.

== Review and Events ==
- At the beginning of the season, Liga Bet clubs competed in the State Cup, the first four rounds played within each division as a league cup competition, with the divisional winner and runner-up qualifying to the nationwide sixth round. Ironi Bnei Kabul, F.C Haifa Robi Shapira, F.C. Roei Heshbon Tel Aviv and Bnei Yeechalal Rehovot had beaten their rivals in the finals, played between 16 October and 20 October 2015.
- On 8 January 2016, Bnei Maghar announced their resignation from the league, due to financial difficulties and lack of sufficient football stadium in Maghar.

== North A Division ==
Pos	Team	Pld	W	D	L	GF	GA	GD	Pts	Promotion or relegation
1	Tzeirei Kafr Kanna	28	18	8	2	60	26	+34	62	Promotion to Liga Alef
2	Hapoel Bu'eine	28	14	9	5	41	23	+18	51	Promotion play-offs
3	Ironi Bnei Kabul	28	12	12	4	40	21	+19	48	Promotion play-offs
4	Hapoel Kaukab	28	14	5	9	46	38	+8	47 (Note: HKB–MIA 1–1; MIA–HKB 2–2)	Promotion play-offs
5	Maccabi Ironi Acre	28	14	5	9	53	36	+17	47	Promotion play-offs
6	Hapoel Shefa-'Amr	28	13	9	6	51	26	+25	47 (Note: Hapoel Shefa-'Amr had one point deducted as the club's fans spat and threw water bottles at the referee assistant during a match, played on 5 February 2016, against Maccabi Bnei Nahf.)	
7	Beitar Nahariya	28	13	2	13	42	39	+3	41	
8	Hapoel Ihud Bnei Sumei	28	9	7	12	34	39	−5	34	
9	Ahva Kafr Manda	28	9	5	14	37	44	−7	32	
10	Ahi Acre	28	7	11	10	33	44	−11	32	
11	Maccabi Bnei Nahf	28	9	4	15	35	43	−8	31	
12	Al-Nahda Nazareth	28	9	3	16	34	51	−17	30	Relegation play-offs
13	Beitar Haifa	28	8	6	14	27	40	−13	30	Relegation play-offs
14	Ahi Bir al-Maksur	28	6	7	15	21	44	−23	25	Relegation play-offs
15	Beitar Kafr Kanna	28	6	5	17	24	64	−40	23	Relegation play-offs
–	Hapoel Bnei Maghar	0	0	0	0	0	0	0	0	

Updated to match(es) played on 19 April 2016. Source: IFA (in Hebrew)
Rules for classification: 1st points; 2nd matches won; 3rd head-to-head; 4th decision match

== North B Division ==
Pos	Team	Pld	W	D	L	GF	GA	GD	Pts	Promotion or relegation
1	F.C Haifa Robi Shapira	30	22	4	4	63	18	+45	70	Promotion to Liga Alef
2	Hapoel Umm al-Fahm	30	18	7	5	55	22	+33	61	Promotion play-offs
3	Hapoel Sandala Gilboa	30	16	6	8	49	27	+22	54	Promotion play-offs
4	Hapoel Bnei Zalafa	30	14	7	9	49	31	+18	49	Promotion play-offs
5	F.C. Daburiyya	30	13	8	9	50	44	+6	47	Promotion play-offs
6	Maccabi Ahi Iksal	30	10	9	11	35	39	−4	39 (Note: HDK–MAI 1–1; MAI–HDK 3–1)	
7	Hapoel Daliyat al-Karmel	30	10	9	11	34	35	−1	39	
8	Maccabi Sulam	30	11	5	14	48	62	−14	38 (Note: MEM–BKQ 2–1, 1–0; MEM–MSU 2–4, 1–1; MSU–BKQ 0–1, 3–1)	
9	Ihud Bnei Kafr Qara	30	11	5	14	27	32	−5	38	
10	Maccabi Ein Mahil	30	11	5	14	33	44	−11	38	
11	Maccabi Umm al-Fahm	30	12	4	14	34	38	−4	37 (Note: Maccabi Umm al-Fahm had three points deducted.)	
12	Hapoel Ramot Menashe Megiddo	30	10	6	14	37	57	−20	36	Relegation play-offs
13	F.C. Tzeirei Tur'an	30	10	4	16	40	49	−9	34	Relegation play-offs
14	Ihud Bnei Baqa	30	8	10	12	37	51	−14	34	Relegation play-offs
15	Maccabi Ironi Yafa	30	7	7	16	25	41	−16	28	Relegation play-offs
16	F.C. Pardes Hanna-Karkur	30	5	8	17	28	54	−26	23	Relegation to Liga Gimel

Updated to match(es) played on 19 April 2016. Source: IFA (in Hebrew)
Rules for classification: 1st points; 2nd matches won; 3rd head-to-head; 4th decision match

== South A Division ==
Pos	Team	Pld	W	D	L	GF	GA	GD	Pts	Promotion or relegation
1	F.C. Bnei Jaffa Ortodoxim	30	22	2	6	57	33	+24	68	Promotion to Liga Alef
2	F.C. Tira	30	21	3	6	55	24	+31	66	Promotion play-offs
3	Hapoel Kafr Qasim Shouaa	30	15	5	10	48	37	+11	50	Promotion play-offs
4	F.C. Ironi Or Yehuda	30	13	9	8	44	35	+9	48	Promotion play-offs
5	Hapoel Pardesiya	30	13	8	9	55	39	+16	47	Promotion play-offs
6	A.S. Holon	30	13	7	10	49	43	+6	46	
7	Beitar Petah Tikva	30	10	9	11	38	39	−1	39	
8	Hapoel Nahlat Yehuda	30	10	6	14	46	47	−1	36 (Note: HKO–HNY 0–3; HNY–HKO 2–2)	
9	Hapoel Kiryat Ono	30	10	6	14	38	39	−1	36	
10	Hapoel Ramat Israel	30	10	5	15	45	65	−20	35	
11	F.C. Tzeirei Tayibe	30	9	8	13	46	49	−3	35	
12	F.C. Roei Heshbon Tel Aviv	30	9	7	14	36	52	−16	34	Relegation play-offs
13	Beitar Ramat Gan	30	9	6	15	39	45	−6	33 (Note: MKY–HZH 1–4, 1–1; HZH–BRG 0–2, 1–6; MKY–BRG 0–3, 1–4)	Relegation play-offs
14	Hapoel Tzafririm Holon	30	9	6	15	35	52	−17	33	Relegation play-offs
15	Maccabi Ironi Kfar Yona	30	9	6	15	41	56	−15	33	Relegation play-offs
16	Ironi Beit Dagan	30	7	9	14	43	60	−17	30	Relegation to Liga Gimel

Updated to match(es) played on 19 April 2016. Source: IFA (in Hebrew)
Rules for classification: 1st points; 2nd matches won; 3rd head-to-head; 4th decision match

== South B Division ==
Pos	Team	Pld	W	D	L	GF	GA	GD	Pts	Promotion or relegation
1	F.C. Dimona	30	21	6	3	68	20	+48	69	Promotion to Liga Alef
2	F.C. Be'er Sheva	30	20	4	6	78	31	+47	64	Promotion play-offs
3	F.C. Holon Yaniv	30	16	9	5	48	22	+26	57	Promotion play-offs
4	Maccabi Kiryat Malakhi	30	17	5	8	52	28	+24	56	Promotion play-offs
5	Ironi Modi'in	30	16	7	7	55	29	+26	55	Promotion play-offs
6	Beitar Ma'ale Adumim	30	15	8	7	67	43	+24	53	
7	Beitar Giv'at Ze'ev	30	12	7	11	42	41	+1	43	
8	Maccabi Be'er Sheva	30	12	3	15	46	60	−14	39 (Note: MBS–MSS 3–1; MSS–MBS 1–2)	
9	Maccabi Segev Shalom	30	12	3	15	51	65	−14	39	
10	Ironi Beit Shemesh	30	11	4	15	39	60	−21	37	
11	Maccabi Ironi Netivot	30	10	7	13	47	45	+2	37	
12	Bnei Yeechalal Rehovot	30	9	6	15	26	32	−6	33	Relegation play-offs
13	Tzeirei Rahat	30	9	3	18	32	62	−30	30	Relegation play-offs
14	Beitar Yavne	30	8	6	16	42	60	−18	30	Relegation play-offs
15	Hapoel Merhavim	30	5	7	18	44	64	−20	22	Relegation play-offs
16	Hapoel Rahat	30	3	3	24	29	103	−74	11 (Note: Hapoel Rahat had one point deducted for fielding an ineligible player.)	Relegation to Liga Gimel

Updated to match(es) played on 19 April 2016. Source: IFA (in Hebrew)
Rules for classification: 1st points; 2nd matches won; 3rd head-to-head; 4th decision match

== Promotion play-offs ==
=== Northern Divisions ===
Division semi-finals
2	Hapoel Bu'eine	3
5	Maccabi Ironi Acre	0
North A division
3	Bnei Kabul	0 (1)
4	Hapoel Kaukab	0 (4)
2	Hapoel Umm al-Fahm	3
5	F.C. Daburiyya	2
North B division
3	Hapoel Sandala Gilboa	1
4	Bnei Zalafa	3

Division final
2	Hapoel Bu'eine	0 (4)
4	Hapoel Kaukab	0 (2)
2	Hapoel Umm al-Fahm	1 (3)
4	Bnei Zalafa	1 (2)

Regional final
2NA	Hapoel Bu'eine	0
2NB	Hapoel Umm al-Fahm	3

Hapoel Umm al-Fahm qualified to the promotion play-off match against 14th ranked club in Liga Alef North division, Maccabi Daliyat al-Karmel.

=== Southern Divisions ===
Division semi-finals
2	F.C. Tira	3
5	Hapoel Pardesiya	2
South A division
3	Hap. K. Qasim Shouaa	1
4	Ironi Or Yehuda	0
2	F.C. Be'er Sheva	2
5	Ironi Modi'in	0
South B division
3	F.C. Holon	1 (2)
4	Maccabi Kiryat Malakhi	1 (4)

Division final
2	F.C. Tira	3
3	Hap. K. Qasim Shouaa	2
2	F.C. Be'er Sheva	2 (4)
4	Maccabi Kiryat Malakhi	2 (3)

Regional final
2SA	F.C. Tira	1
2SB	F.C. Be'er Sheva	0

F.C. Tira qualified to the promotion play-off match against 14th ranked club in Liga Alef South division, Maccabi Amishav Petah Tikva.

=== Promotion play-off Matches ===
==== North section ====
13 May 2016	Hapoel Umm al-Fahm	0 – 1	Maccabi Daliyat al-Karmel	Ilut Stadium, Ilut
15:00 UTC+3		Report (in Hebrew)	Malasa 52'	Referee: Guy Berger

Maccabi Daliyat al-Karmel remained in Liga Alef; Hapoel Umm al-Fahm remained in Liga Bet.

==== South Section ====
13 May 2016	F.C. Tira	1 – 1 (a.e.t.) (3–1 p)	Maccabi Amishav Petah Tikva	Toto Stadium, Lod
15:00 UTC+3	Mansour 117'	Report (in Hebrew)	Yehudai 120'	Referee: Liran Wachsberger
	Penalties
	Sha'ari (penalty missed); Kashoua (penalty scored); Gindiya (penalty scored); Amar (penalty scored)		Lankri (penalty missed); Arbiv (penalty missed); Zaliat (penalty missed); Hemo (penalty scored)

F.C. Tira Promoted to Liga Alef; Maccabi Amishav Petah Tikva relegated to Liga Bet.

== Relegation play-offs ==
=== Northern divisions ===
North A division

Semi-finals
12	Al-Nahda Nazareth	0
15	Beitar Kafr Kanna	2
13	Beitar Haifa	1
14	Ahi Bir al-Maksur	0

Final
12	Al-Nahda Nazareth	1
14	Ahi Bir al-Maksur	0

Ahi Bir al-Maksur relegated to Liga Gimel

North B division

Semi-finals
12	Hap. Ramot Menashe	0 (12)
15	Ironi Yafa	0 (13)
13	Tzeirei Tur'an	3
14	Ihud Bnei Baqa	0

Final
12	Hap. Ramot Menashe	3
14	Ihud Bnei Baqa	0

Ihud Bnei Baqa relegated to Liga Gimel

=== Southern divisions ===
South A division

Semi-finals
12	R.H. Tel Aviv	5
15	Ironi Kfar Yona	0
13	Beitar Ramat Gan	1
14	Tzafririm Holon	0

Final
15	Ironi Kfar Yona	2
14	Tzafririm Holon	0

Hapoel Tzafririm Holon relegated to Liga Gimel

South B division

Semi-finals
12	Bnei Yeechalal	2
15	Hapoel Merhavim	0
13	Tzeirei Rahat	0
14	Beitar Yavne	2

Final
15	Hapoel Merhavim	0
13	Tzeirei Rahat	1

Hapoel Merhavim relegated to Liga Gimel
