= Yinon Barda =

Israeli footballer

Yinon Barda ינון ברדה
Personal information
- Full name: Yinon Barda
- Date of birth: October 2, 1984 (age 42)
- Place of birth: Beersheba, Israel
- Position: Striker

Youth career
- Hapoel Be'er Sheva

Senior career*
Years	Team	Apps	(Gls)
2002–2006	Hapoel Be'er Sheva	51	(6)
2006–2007	F.C. Ashdod	5	(0)
2007–2008	Hapoel Bnei Lod	14	(3)
2008–2009	Hapoel Ashkelon	33	(9)
2010–2011	Maccabi Be'er Sheva	35	(13)
2011–2012	Hapoel Rishon LeZion	15	(5)
2012	Hapoel Bnei Lod	10	(3)
2012–2013	Maccabi Herzliya	6	(0)
2013–2014	Maccabi Kiryat Gat	19	(4)
2014–2016	Hapoel Bnei Lod	45	(11)
2016–2018	F.C. Dimona	51	(13)
2018–2019	F.C. Be'er Sheva	18	(6)
- * Club domestic league appearances and goals

Yinon Barda (Hebrew: ינון ברדה; born 2 October 1984) is an Israeli of a Tunisian-Jewish descent footballer, currently playing for F.C. Dimona.
