= Hapoel Bnei Zalafa F.C. =

Israeli football club

- Full name: Hapoel Bnei Zalafa Football Club
- Founded: 2010
- Ground: HaShalom Stadium
- Capacity: 12,000
- Chairman: Majeed Al-Saadi
- Manager: Ahmad Saba'a
- League: Liga Alef North
- 2024–25: Liga Alef North, 6th of 16
Home colours	Away colours

Hapoel Bnei Zalafa (Hebrew: הפועל בני זלפה) is an Israeli football club based in Zalafa. The club currently plays in Liga Alef North.

== History ==
The club was founded in 2010 and registered to play in Liga Gimel, where it was placed in the Jezreel division, where it played for five seasons, until it was promoted just before the beginning of the 2015–16 season, as F.C. Givat Olga and Hapoel Hadera merged, leaving an available spot in Liga Bet, which was given to the club as the third best runners-up in Liga Gimel (as the two best runners-up, Maccabi Bnei Nahf and Ahi Bir al-Maksur were already promoted during the summer break). The club finished 4th in its first season in Liga Bet and qualified to the promotion play-offs, losing to Hapoel Umm al-Fahm in the divisional finals on penalties.
