= Ahi Bir al-Maksur F.C. =

Israeli football club

- Full name: Ahi Bir al-Maksur Football Club אחי ביר אל מכסור
- Founded: 2010
- Ground: Bir al-Maksur
- Manager: Nael Atrash
- League: Liga Bet North A
- 2014–15: Liga Gimel Lower Galilee, 2nd (Promoted)

Ahi Bir al-Maksur F.C. (Hebrew: אחי ביר אל מכסור'; Arabic: اخاء بئر المكسور), is an Israeli football club based in Bir al-Maksur. The club is currently in Liga Bet North A division.

== History ==
The club was founded in 2010 and joined Liga Gimel Jezreel division, where it played for three seasons, improving from finishing 13th in 2010–11 to 4th in 2012–13. In 2013 the club was moved to the Lower Galilee division, where the club finished 2nd in 2014–15 and was promoted to Liga Bet.
