= Al-Sharabi =

al-Sharabi or al-Sharābi (Arabic: الشرعبي or الشرابي) are Arabic surnames. The first one may originate from the Shar'ab as-Salam district, Yemen and literally mean "a person from Shar'ab". Notable people with the surname include:

- Al-Harith ibn Sima al-Sharabi
- Bugha al-Sharabi
- Jamal al-Sharabi

== See also ==
- Sharabi
