= Adir Sharabi =

Israeli footballer

Adir Sharabi אדיר שרעבי
Personal information
- Full name: Adir Sharabi
- Date of birth: 8 October 1977 (age 49)
- Place of birth: Rehovot, Israel
- Position: Central midfielder

Youth career
- 1987–1992: Maccabi Sha'arayim
- 1992–1995: Maccabi Tel Aviv

Senior career*
Years	Team	Apps	(Gls)
1995–1997	Maccabi Sha'arayim	35	(0)
1997–1998	Beitar Be'er Sheva	25	(0)
1998–1999	Maccabi Ironi Ashdod	30	(1)
1999–2000	F.C. Ashdod	25	(1)
2000–2001	Hapoel Ramat Gan	20	(-)
2002–2003	Hapoel Marmorek	30	(-)
2003–2005	Hapoel Ramat Gan	18	(-)
2005–2007	Sektzia Ness Ziona	80	(10)
2007–2010	Hapoel Marmorek	109	(20)
2010–2012	Maccabi Yavne	49	(5)
2013–2015	Beitar Yavne	10	(2)
Total		-	(-)
- * Club domestic league appearances and goals

Adir Sharabi (Hebrew: אדיר שרעבי; born 8 October 1977) is an Israeli former footballer.

== Honours ==
- Toto Cup (1):
  - 2008–09
