= Shalom Sharabi (Shabak) =

Israeli intelligence officer

Shalom Sharabi (Hebrew: שלום שרעבי; born 1953) is a former Shin Bet officer (1978–2006). His last position before retirement was head of the Counterintelligence and Subversion Prevention Division, better known as the Jewish Division (2004–2006), which is primarily in charge of monitoring Israeli far-right extremism.

Shalom Sharabi comes from a family of Yemenite Jews who immigrated to Israel from Taiz in late 1930s.
