= Roi Atar =

Israeli footballer

Roei Atar רועי עטר
Personal information
- Full name: Roei Atar
- Date of birth: April 4, 1994 (age 32)
- Place of birth: Tirat Carmel, Israel
- Position: Forward

Youth career
- 2006–2013: Maccabi Haifa

Senior career*
Years	Team	Apps	(Gls)
2012–2014	Maccabi Haifa	1	(0)
2013–2014	→ Hapoel Acre (loan)	8	(0)
2014–2015	Hapoel Ramat HaSharon	20	(2)
2015–2016	Hapoel Ra'anana	0	(0)
2016–2017	Hapoel Nazareth Illit	34	(10)
2017–2018	Hapoel Afula	14	(0)
2018–2019	Ironi Nesher	8	(0)
2019–2020	Maccabi Ironi Tirat HaCarmel	0	(0)

International career
2010	Israel U16	2	(1)
2010–2011	Israel U17	7	(3)
2011–2012	Israel U18	5	(1)
2012	Israel U19	8	(2)
- * Club domestic league appearances and goals

Roi Atar (Hebrew: רועי עטר; born April 4, 1994) is an Israeli footballer who plays for Hapoel Afula.

== Honours ==
- Israeli Youth Championship:
  - Championships (1): 2012–13
  - Runner-up (1): 2011–12
- Youth State Cup:
  - Winner (1): 2013
  - Runner-up (1): 2012
