= Ohad Edelstein =

Israeli footballer

Personal information
- Full name: Ohad Edelstein
- Date of birth: May 25, 1992 (age 34)
- Place of birth: Giv'at Shmuel, Israel
- Position: Winger

Team information
- Current team: Maccabi Yavne

Youth career
- 2002–2009: Hapoel Kiryat Ono
- 2009–2011: Hapoel Petah Tikva

Senior career*
Years	Team	Apps	(Gls)
2011–2016	Hapoel Petah Tikva	23	(2)
2013	→ Hapoel Katamon Jerusalem (loan)	18	(0)
2014	→ Maccabi Kiryat Gat (loan)	14	(5)
2014–2015	→ Hapoel Ashkelon (loan)	29	(6)
2015–2016	→ Maccabi Kiryat Gat (loan)	19	(1)
2016	→ Maccabi Yavne (loan)	15	(0)
2016–2019	F.C. Kafr Qasim	84	(20)
2019–2020	Hapoel Marmorek	12	(2)
2020–2021	Hapoel Ashdod	32	(6)
2021–2022	Shimshon Kafr Qasim	33	(8)
2022–2023	Maccabi Yavne	29	(1)
- * Club domestic league appearances and goals as of 1 June 2023

Ohad Edelstein (Hebrew: אוהד אדלשטיין; born 25 May 1992) is an Israeli footballer who currently plays at Maccabi Yavne.
