= Ran Ben Shimon (footballer, born 1990) =

Israeli footballer

Ran Ben Shimon רן בן שמעון
Personal information
- Full name: Ran Ben Shimon
- Date of birth: May 23, 1990 (age 36)
- Place of birth: Ashdod, Israel
- Position: Striker

Youth career
- F.C. Ashdod

Senior career*
| Years | Team | Apps | (Gls) |
| 2008–2013 | F.C. Ashdod | 0 | (0) |
| 2010–2011 | → Hapoel Rishon LeZion (loan) | 10 | (0) |
| 2011–2012 | → Maccabi Ironi Bat Yam (loan) | 32 | (14) |
| 2012–2014 | Hapoel Bnei Lod | 32 | (12) |
| 2014 | Hapoel Ramat Gan | 16 | (7) |
| 2014–2015 | Maccabi Kiryat Gat | 19 | (3) |
| 2015 | Maccabi Yavne | 14 | (1) |
| 2015–2016 | Beitar Tel Aviv Ramla | 23 | (4) |
| 2016–2017 | F.C. Kafr Qasim | 41 | (19) |
| 2017–2018 | Shimshon Bnei Tayibe | 16 | (2) |
| 2018 | Maccabi Ironi Ashdod | 11 | (6) |
| 2018–2020 | Maccabi Sha'arayim | 35 | (15) |
| 2020–2021 | F.C. Ironi Or Yehuda | 8 | (1) |
| 2021 | Maccabi Sha'arayim | 12 | (4) |
| 2021–2022 | F.C. Ramla | 12 | (7) |
| 2022 | Hapoel Kiryat Ono | 9 | (0) |
| 2023 | Hapoel Ashkelon | 6 | (0) |
| 2024– | Maccabi Ashkelon | 16 | (14) |
- * Club domestic league appearances and goals as of 14 March 2025

Ran Ben Shimon (Hebrew: רן בן שמעון) is an Israeli footballer.
