= Herzliya Municipal Stadium =

Football stadium in Herzliya, Israel

Coordinates: 32°10′04″N 34°49′29″E

Herzliya Municipal Stadium אצטדיון העירוני הרצליה
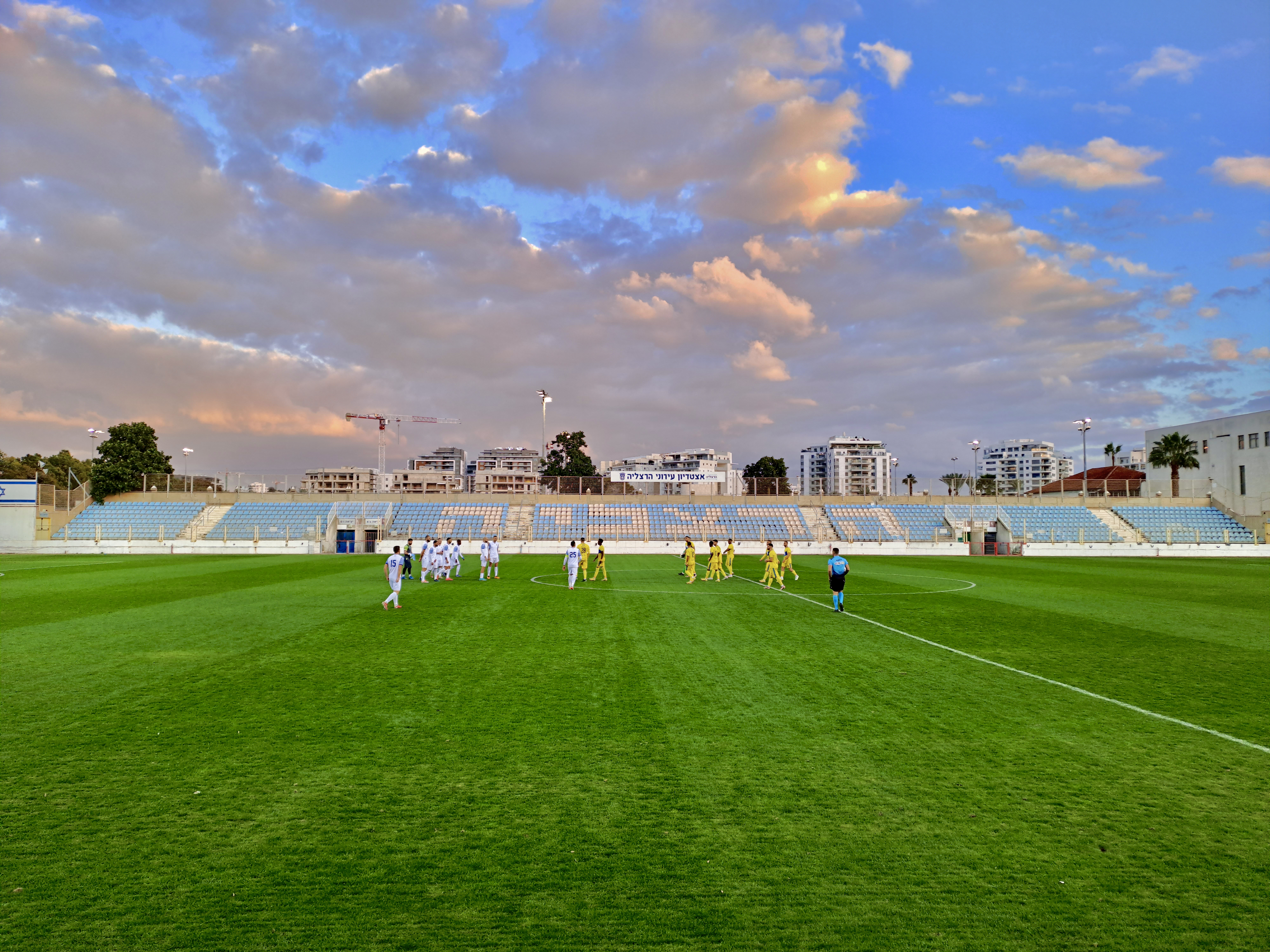
- Interactive map of Herzliya Municipal Stadium אצטדיון העירוני הרצליה
- Location: Herzliya, Tel Aviv District, Israel
- Owner: Municipality of Herzliya
- Capacity: 8,100
- Surface: Grass

Construction
- Opened: 1983

Tenants
- Maccabi Herzliya; Hapoel Herzliya

Herzliya Municipal Stadium is a multi-purpose stadium in the Tel Aviv District city of Herzliya, Israel.

The stadium is used mostly for football matches and is the home ground of Maccabi Herzliya and Hapoel Herzliya. The stadium has 8,100 seats.

In 2017, the stadium hosted the Peres Center for Peace Mini Mondial with children from both the Jewish and Arab sectors coming together for a special soccer event after a year of training together.

In April 2023, Maccabi Herzliya faced a stadium issue, preventing them from hosting home matches due to non-compliance with league standards (Liga Leumit). To address this, the municipality initiated a late 2023 upgrade, collaborating with authorities to meet the required standards and enhance the overall football experience. The renovated Herzliya Stadium reflects the club's commitment to elevating Israeli football standards.

== See also ==
- Sports in Israel
