= Green Stadium, Nof HaGalil =

Football stadium in Nof HaGalil, Israel

Coordinates: 32°41′23.28″N 35°18′40.77″E

Green Stadium
- אצטדיון גרין
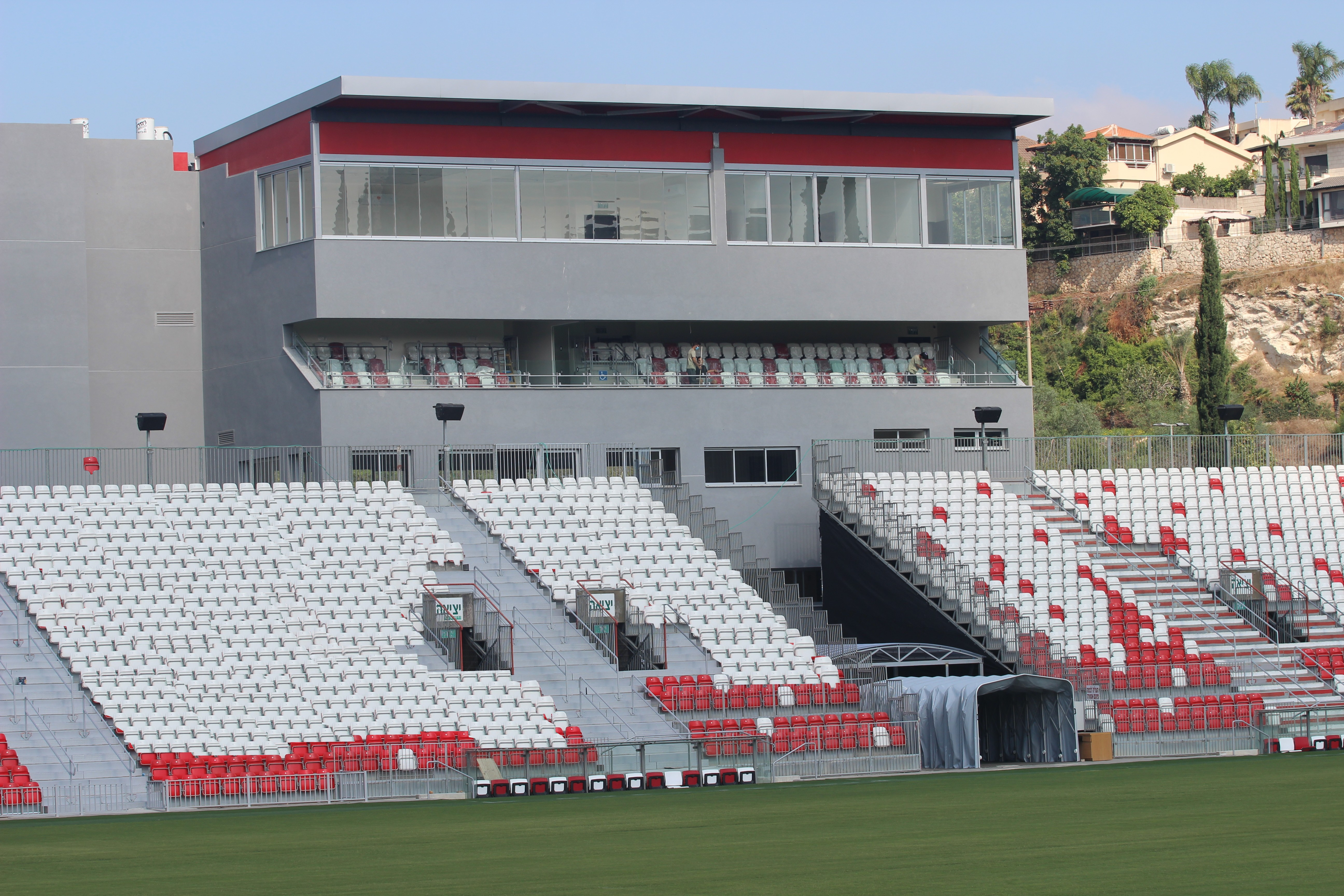
- Interactive map of Green Stadium
- Former names: George Meany Stadium
- Location: Nof HaGalil, Israel
- Owner: Municipality of Nof HaGalil
- Operator: Municipality of Nof HaGalil
- Capacity: 5,155
- Surface: Grass

Construction
- Opened: 1965
- Renovated: 2004, 2019–2020

Tenants
- Hapoel Nof HaGalil; F.C. Nazareth Illit (2012–2017); Hapoel Acre (2009–2011); Hapoel Afula (2013–2014)

Green Stadium (Hebrew: אצטדיון גרין, Etztadion Green) is a football stadium in Nof HaGalil, Israel.

== History ==
The construction of the stadium began in 1960 as a joint stadium of the city of Nazareth and Kiryat Nazareth (as it was then called Nof HaGalil) at the initiative of the General Histadrut of the Workers in the Land of Israel. The plan was for the stadium to be used by a joint Jewish-Arab soccer team that would be established for the two cities, under the auspices of the Hapoel Sports Association. First there was talk of building 10,000 seats, and in 1964 it was announced that the final plan was for 45,000 Olympic-style seats, of which 6,000 seats would be built in the first phase.

The funds for the construction of the stadium were raised by George Meany, chairman of the trade unions in the United States, after a visit he made to Nazareth. The stadium was officially inaugurated in the summer of 1965 and was called "George Mini Stadium" and it has one central stand on the eastern side with 3,000 seats and 12,000 standing places. After its inauguration, a conflict broke out between several parties over its ownership and management, and it was little used in the first years after its establishment. At first it was proposed that the ownership be divided between the Nazareth Illit local council which would hold 50%, the Nazareth Illit Workers Council 25% and the Nazareth Workers Council 25%.

The goal was to convince the Hapoel Bnei Nazareth team, which was then playing in Liga Alef, to play in the stadium, since it would attract a large crowd to its games. The Nazareth Workers' Council demanded 50% of the ownership and Hapoel Bnei Nazareth was also not enthusiastic about a stadium, since it is built in a valley and you could watch games from the outside without having to buy a ticket. It was finally held by the Upper Nazareth Workers' Council. It was used by Hapoel Nazareth Illit who competed in Liga Gimel and did not attract a large crowd.

In 2004, the stadium was renovated with the help of a donation from the "Green" family and since then it has been named after them. As part of the renovation, the eastern tribune was erected in place of the old eastern tribune and the western tribune, which changed its content to approximately 4,000 seats. In the years 2009-2011, the stadium hosted Hapoel Acre's home games, until the construction of its new stadium was completed. In the 2013/2014 season, Hapoel Afula hosted the matches while its stadium was being renovated and expanded. In the 2014/2015 season, Ironi Tiberias F.C. hosted, since its home stadium did not meet the standards of the national league.

In May 2019, another round of renovations began at the stadium with the aim of expanding and upgrading it to the requirements of the Premier League by adding another stand for about 1,100 spectators, upgrading the western stand, and replacing all the old chairs in the stadium (a total of about 5,200 seats were installed in the stadium).In addition, a synthetic field for training was prepared on the southern side. The renovation, which cost about NIS 35 million, was completed in July 2020.

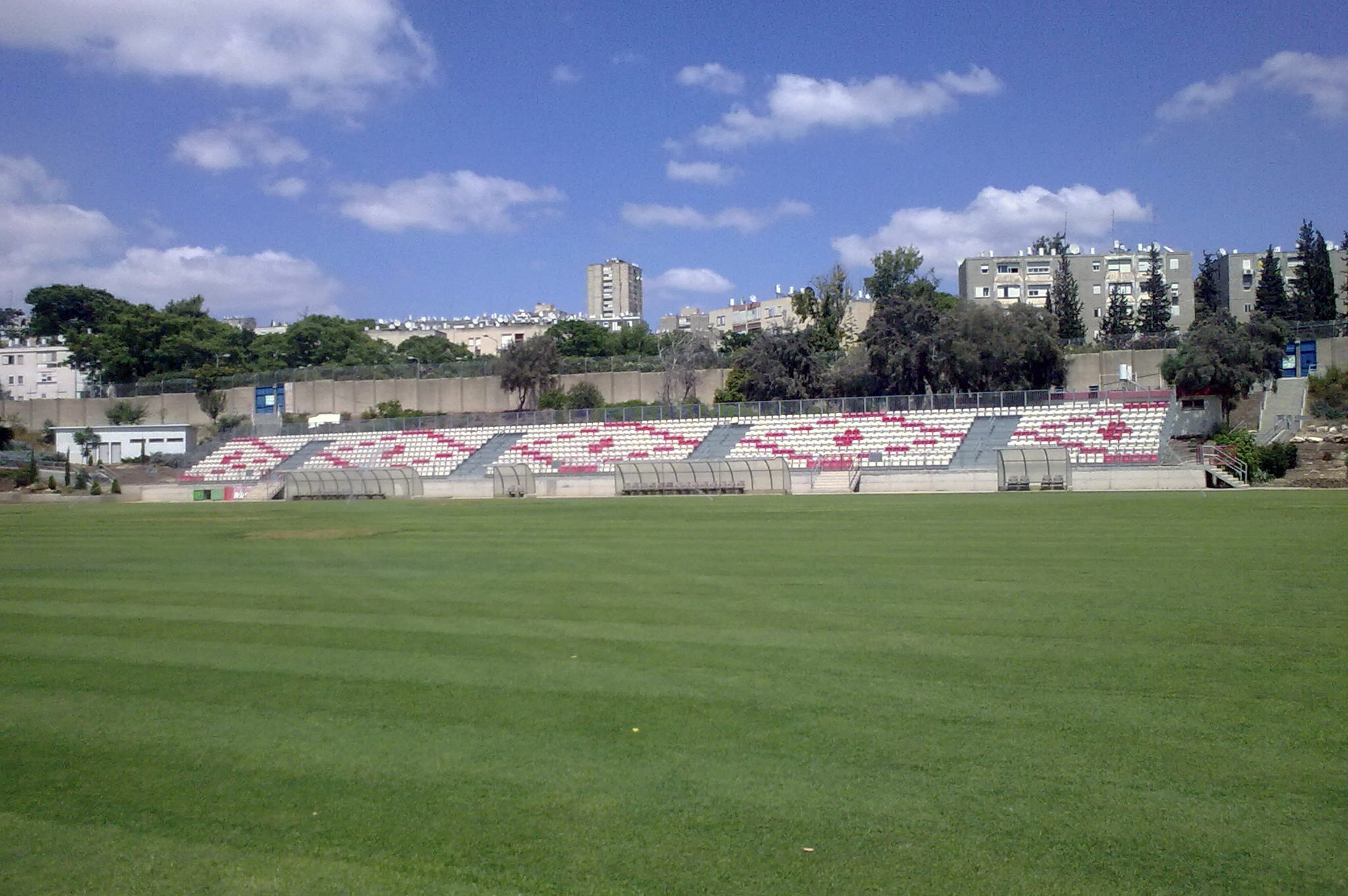
Green Stadium

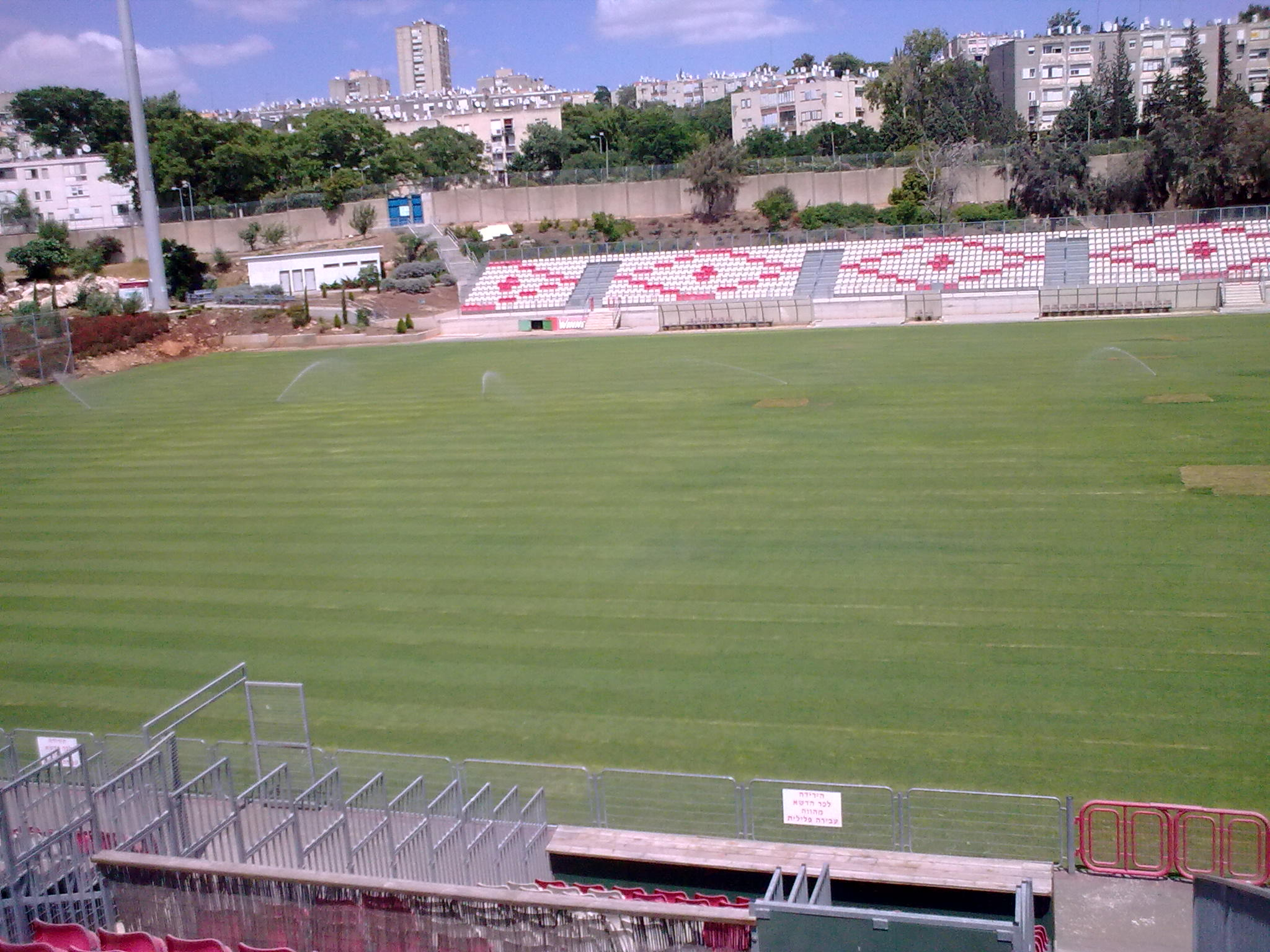
Green Stadium

Since May 2019 the stadium has been under renovations which was set to upgrade the stadium to Israeli Premier League standards.
