= Lod Municipal Stadium =

Football stadium in Lod, Israel

Coordinates: 31°56′21.30″N 34°53′35.40″E

- Interactive map of Lod Municipal Stadium
- Location: Lod, Israel
- Owner: Municipality of Lod
- Capacity: 3,000 (All-seater)
- Surface: Grass

Construction
- Renovated: 2013; 2015

Tenants
- Hapoel Lod; Beitar Lod; Maccabi Lod; Hapoel Maxim Lod; Hapoel Bnei Lod; F.C. Kafr Qasim

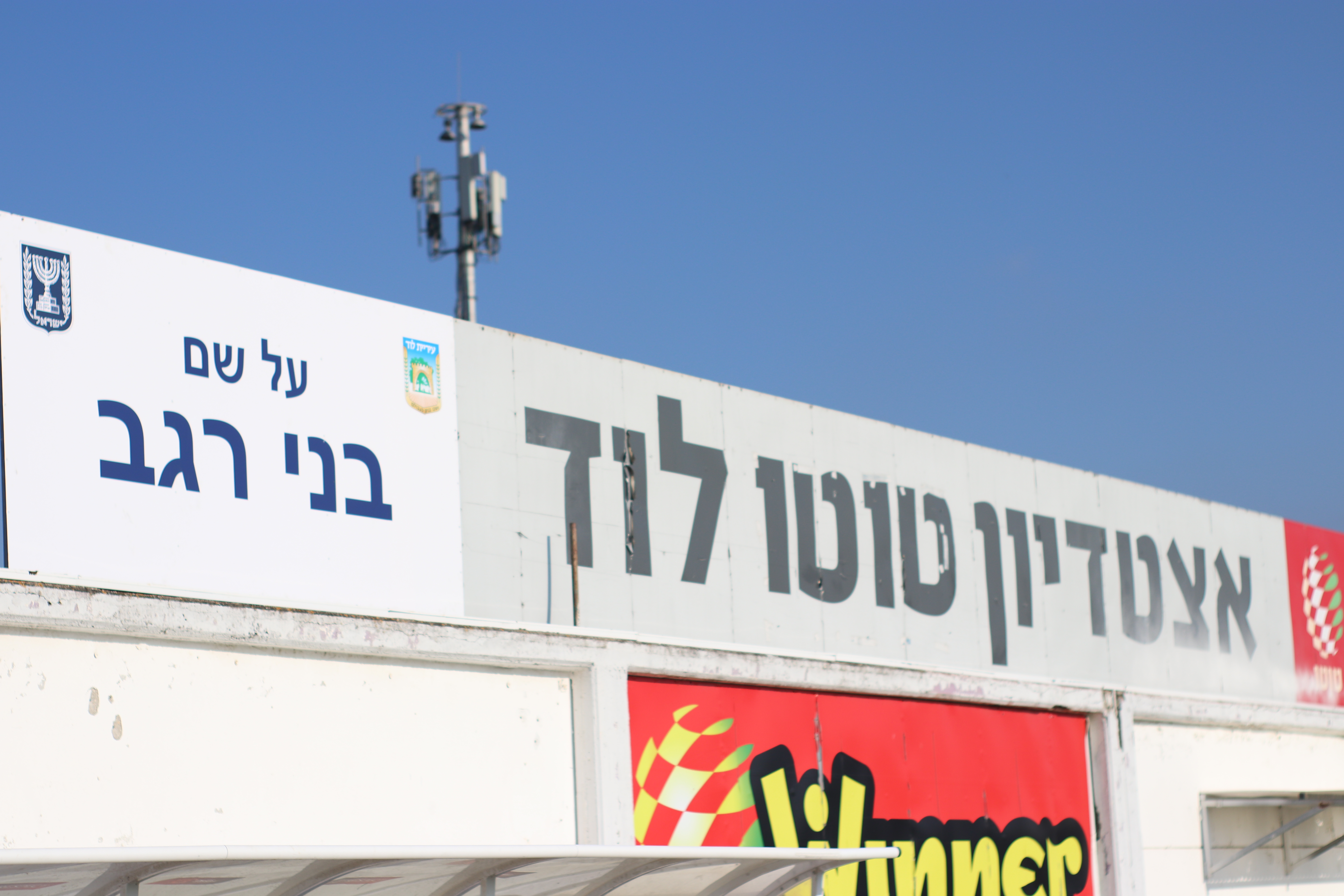
Lod Municipal Stadium (named after Benny Regev)

Lod Municipal Stadium (Hebrew: אצטדיון עירוני לוד; Itztadion Ironi Lod) is a football stadium in Neot Itzhak neighborhood of Lod, Israel. It is currently the home stadium of Hapoel Bnei Lod.

The stadium was built in the 1960s to accommodate Lod's football clubs of Beitar, Maccabi and Hapoel, but fell into disuse and disrepair after the city's major club closed. In 2010, the city was granted 10 million NIS by The Israeli Sports Betting Council, which was used, in part, to renovate the stadium. The stadium was further renovated ahead of the 2015 UEFA Women's Under-19 Championship, in which the stadium hosted four matches.

Adjacent to the stadium are three pitches, including a synthetic pitch, used by the city's minor teams, Hapoel Lod (which also host matches in the main stadium) and F.C. Tzeirei Lod.

== See also ==
- Sports in Israel
