= Winter Stadium =

Football stadium in Ramat Gan, Israel

Coordinates: 32°02′43.08″N 34°48′55.72″E

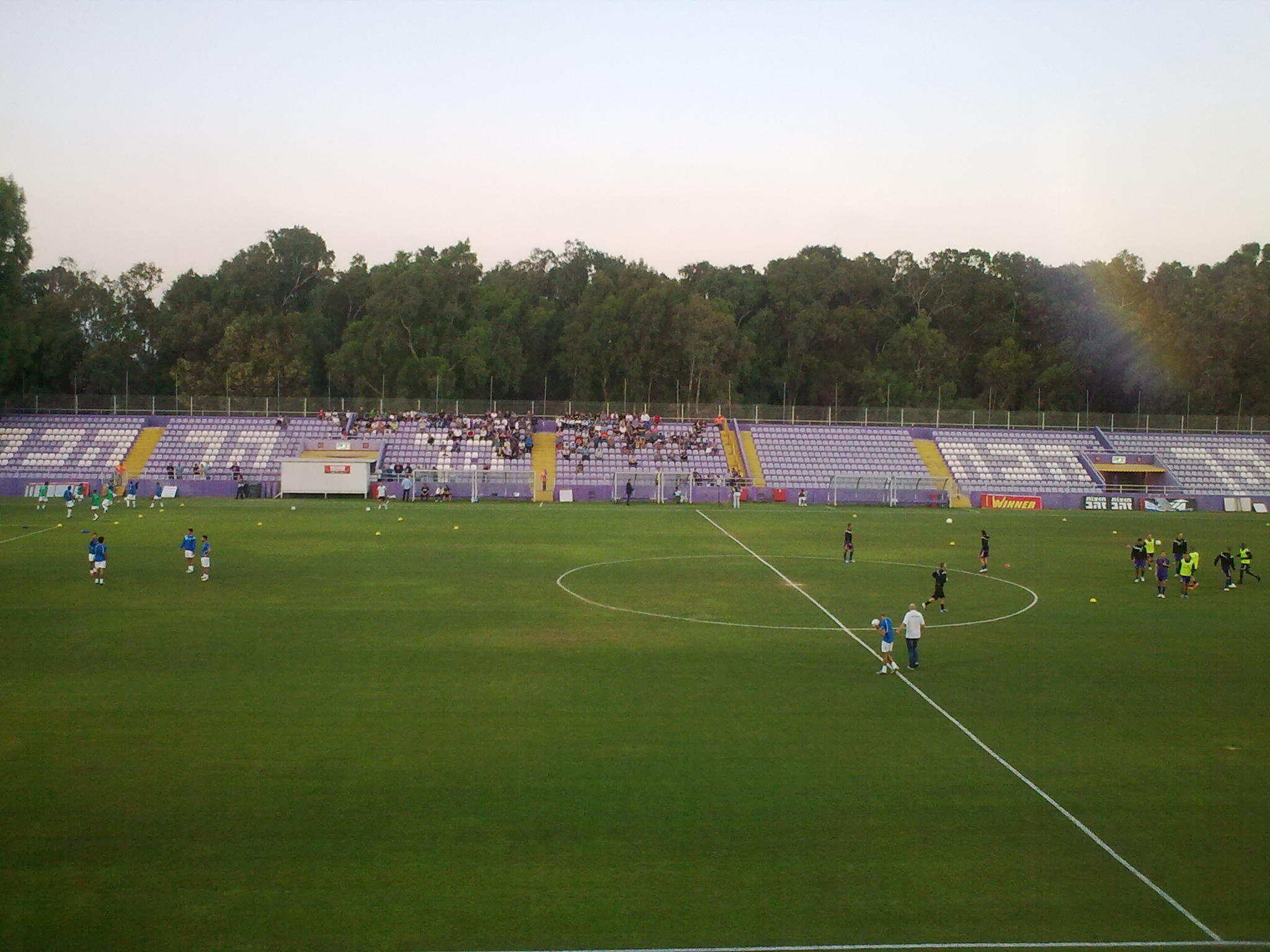
- Interactive map of Winter Stadium
- Location: Ramat Gan, Tel Aviv District, Israel
- Capacity: 8,000
- Surface: Grass

Construction
- Opened: 1981
- Renovated: 2006

Tenants
- Hakoah Ramat Gan (1983–2005); Hakoah Amidar Ramat Gan (2005–present); Hapoel Ramat Gan (2009–2015)

Winter Stadium (Hebrew: אצטדיון וינטר Etztadion Vinter) is a stadium in Tel Aviv District city of Ramat Gan, Israel. It is currently used mostly for football matches and is the home stadium of Hakoah Amidar Ramat Gan.

== History ==
Jack A. and Muriel L. Winter built Winter Stadium. It is named after their sons Jack R. Winter and Michael Winter. Jack A. Winter was the founder of Jack Winter, Inc. The company began as a men's pants manufacturer in the late 1930s and in 1953 began to design women's clothing. As one of the first manufacturers of women's pants, he set trends in women's sportswear and knitwear. He and his wife Muriel were philanthropic leaders in their home city of Milwaukee, Wisconsin.

Work on the stadium began in 1976, as a replacement of Hakoah Ramat Gan's Gali Gil Stadium, which closed in 1974. The stadium's first match was played on 9 July 1981, during the 1981 Maccabiah Games, between the Maccabi teams of Israel and the USA.

The stadium was renovated in 1993, 2000, when plastic seats were placed upon the concrete stands, and 2006, upon the return of Hakoah Amidar to the Israeli football top level.

In August 2026, Israeli archaeologists announced they found ruins of a 7th–9th-century CE commercial complex beneath the stadium's parking lot.

== Gallery ==
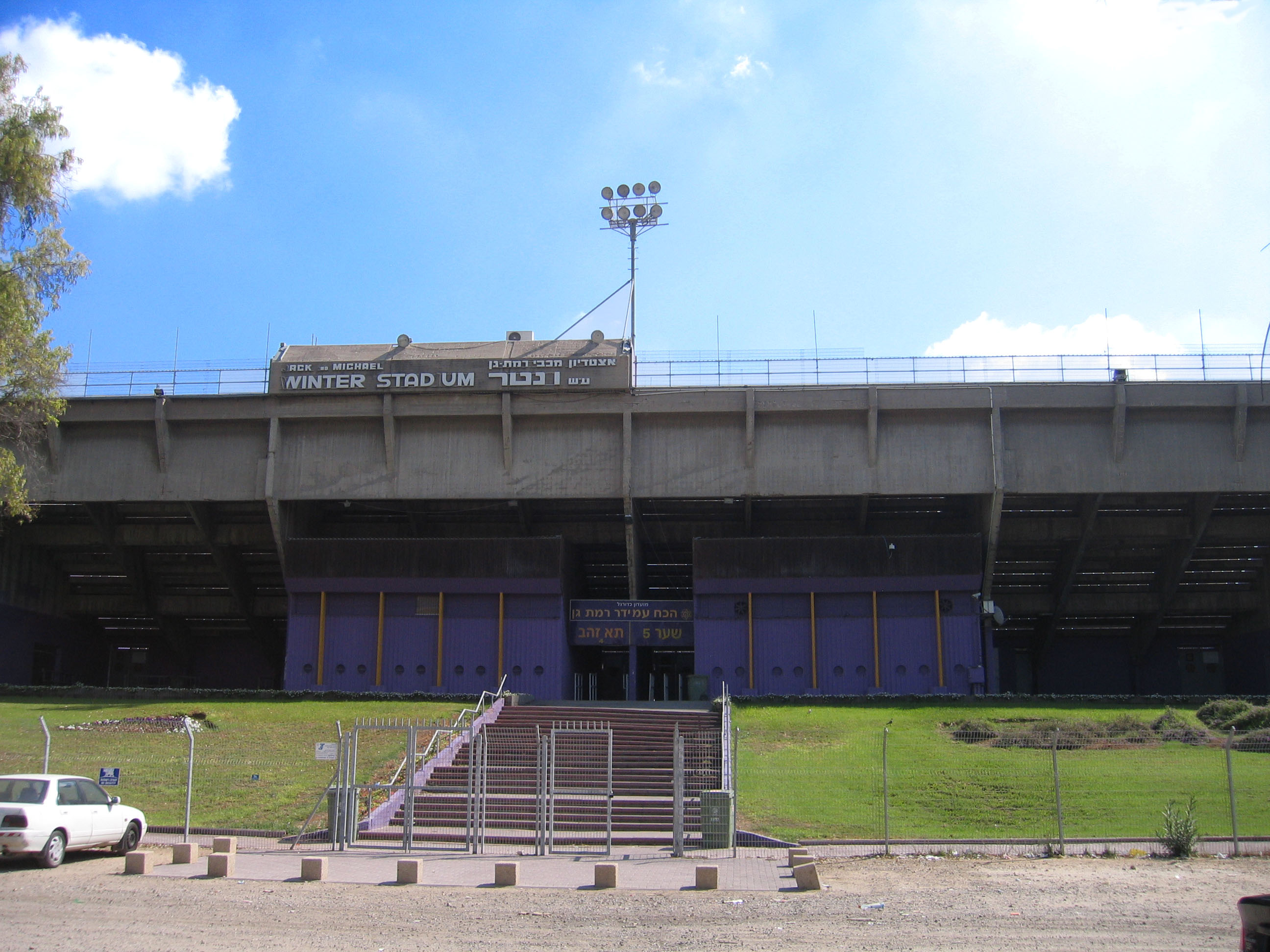
