= Ness Ziona Stadium =

Football stadium in Ness Ziona, Israel

Coordinates: 31°54′55.42″N 34°46′30.73″E

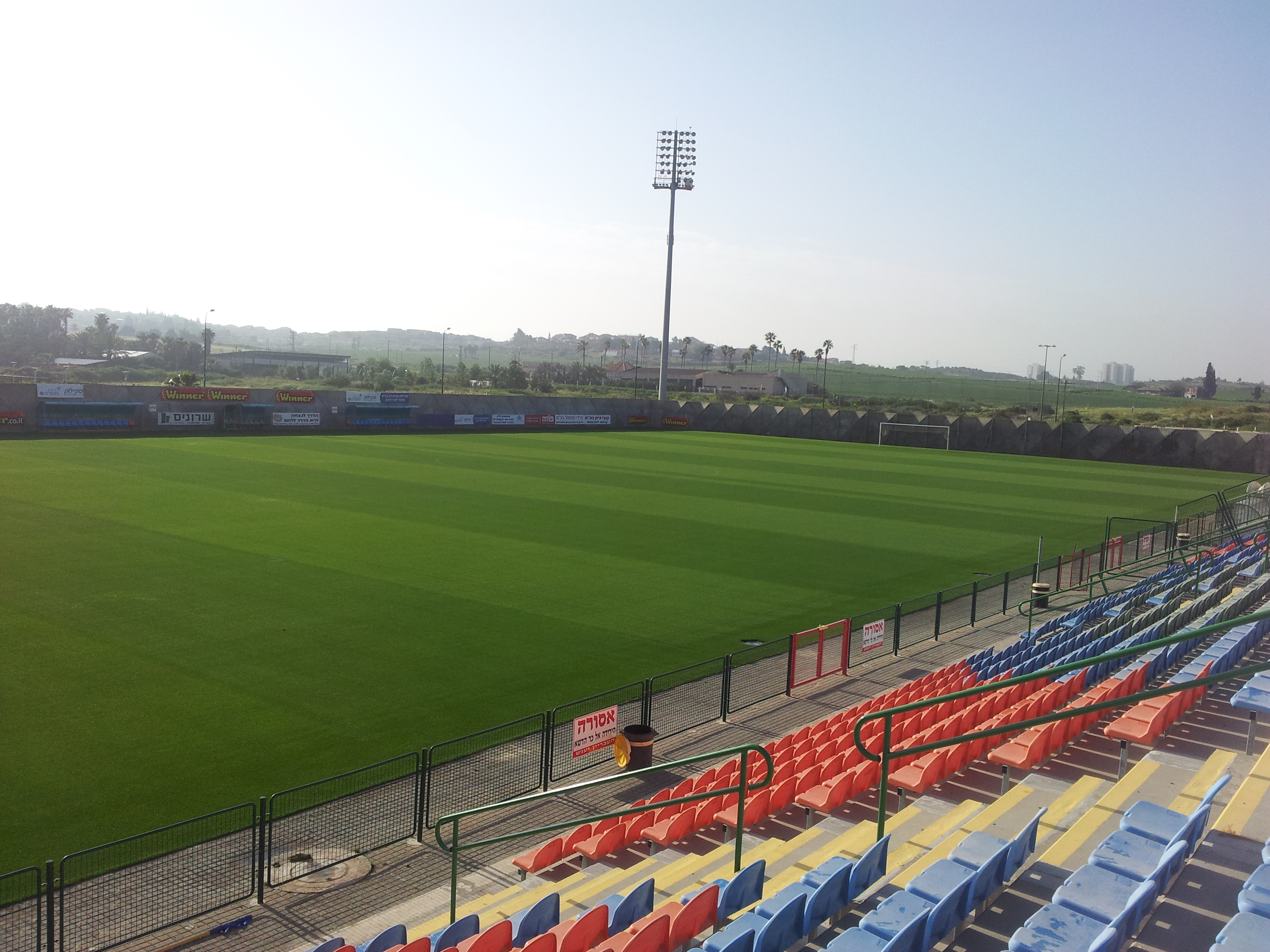
- Interactive map of Ness Ziona Stadium
- Location: Nivheret Street, Ness Ziona, Israel
- Owner: Municipality of Ness Ziona
- Capacity: 3,500
- Surface: Grass

Construction
- Groundbreaking: 2000
- Built: 2001
- Opened: 2001

Tenants
- Sektzia Nes Tziona; Maccabi Yavne (2012–2016); Maccabi Sha'arayim (2016–2017); Beitar Tel Aviv Bat Yam (2019–2022); Maccabi Jaffa (2023–); Ness Ziona (Present)

The Ness Ziona Stadium (Hebrew: אצטדיון נס ציונה), is a municipal sports stadium in Ness Ziona, Israel. It was the home football stadium of Sektzia Nes Tziona until the 2019–20 season.
