= 2014–15 Hapoel Nazareth Illit F.C. season =

Hapoel Nazareth Illit
2014–15 season
- Chairman: Oved Grinfeld
- Manager: Shimon Edri; Ofer Talker
- Stadium: Green Stadium
- Liga Leumit: 14th
- State Cup: 6th round
- 2014-15 Toto Cup Leumit: 4th, Group stage
- Top goalscorer: Eliran Hudeda (6)
| Home colours | Away colours | Third colours |

The 2014–15 season was Hapoel Nazareth Illit's 52nd football season since its establishment, and the sixth consecutive season in Liga Leumit.

== Review and events ==
- In early May 2014, coach Shimon Edri signed with the club for one season.
- On 13 October 2014, the match away against Hapoel Ramat Gan was abandoned due to power failure. The Israel Football Association initially awarded the match to Nazareth Illit, but, after a successful appeal by Ramat Gan, the decision was overturned and the match was ordered to be replayed.
- On 28 January 2015, with the team at the 15th position in the league, Coach Shimon Edri was fired and replaced by Ofer Talker.
- On 22 May 2015, in the last match of the season, the club had beaten Hapoel Rishon LeZion 2–1 to finish the season in the 14th place and avoid relegation. The club's place meant it had to play a relegation/promotion play-off match against Ironi Nesher from Liga Alef.

== Matches ==
=== League ===
==== Regular season ====
| Date | Opponent | Venue | Result | Scorers | Position |
|---|---|---|---|---|---|
| 8 September 2014 – 19:00 | Hapoel Bnei Lod | Away | 1–3 | Deri | 15 |
| 12 September 2014 – 16:30 | Ironi Tiberias | Home | 3–3 | Dahan (o.g.), Hudeda, Sidorenco | 12 |
| 19 September 2014 – 15:30 | Maccabi Herzliya | Away | 3–2 | Abudi, Malkin (2) | 9 |
| 29 September 2014 – 19:00 | Hapoel Rishon LeZion | Away | 0–4 | | 14 |
| 7 October 2014 – 19:00 | Hapoel Kfar Saba | Away | 0–2 | | 14 |
| 17 October 2014 – 19:00 | Maccabi Kiryat Gat | Home | 0–1 | | 14 |
| 24 October 2014 – 15:00 | Maccabi Yavne | Home | 1–1 | Jan (o.g.) | 15 |
| 3 November 2014 – 18:00 | Hapoel Ramat HaSharon | Home | 1–3 | Berkman | 15 |
| 7 November 2014 – 14:00 | Hapoel Afula | Away | 1–3 | Owusu | 15 |
| 14 November 2014 – 14:00 | Maccabi Ahi Nazareth | Home | 0–0 | | 15 |
| 21 November 2014 – 14:00 | Hapoel Jerusalem | Away | 2–2 | Abudi, Hudeda | 15 |
| 1 December 2014 – 18:00 | Hakoah Amidar Ramat Gan | Home | 1–0 | Hudeda | 14 |
| 8 December 2014 – 18:00 | Beitar Tel Aviv Ramla | Away | 2–0 | Berkman, Owusu | 12 |
| 11 December 2014 – 18:00 | Hapoel Ramat Gan | Away | 1–2 | Berkman | 13 |
| 15 December 2014 – 19:15 | Bnei Yehuda | Home | 1–1 | Owusu | 14 |
| 19 December 2014 – 14:30 | Hapoel Bnei Lod | Home | 0–0 | | 14 |
| 29 December 2014 – 19:00 | Ironi Tiberias | Away | 1–1 | Basit | 14 |
| 2 January 2015 – 14:00 | Maccabi Herzliya | Home | 1–2 | Hudeda | 15 |
| 16 January 2015 – 15:00 | Hapoel Kfar Saba | Away | 1–1 | Berkman | 15 |
| 23 January 2015 – 15:00 | Hapoel Ramat Gan | Home | 1–1 | Malkin | 15 |
| 27 January 2015 – 18:00 | Hapoel Rishon LeZion | Home | 1–2 | Sidorenco | 15 |
| 30 January 2015 – 15:00 | Maccabi Kiryat Gat | Away | 2–1 | Brik (2) | 14 |
| 5 February 2015 – 15:00 | Maccabi Yavne | Home | 1–2 | Malkin | 14 |
| 13 February 2015 – 14:00 | Hapoel Ramat HaSharon | Away | 1–2 | Hudeda | 14 |
| 23 February 2015 – 18:00 | Hapoel Afula | Home | 1–4 | Brik | 14 |
| 27 February 2015 – 15:00 | Maccabi Ahi Nazareth | Away | 2–0 | Abudi, Deri | 14 |
| 6 March 2015 – 15:00 | Hapoel Jerusalem | Home | 0–0 | | 14 |
| 16 March 2015 – 18:00 | Hakoah Amidar Ramat Gan | Away | 2–1 | Deri, Malka | 14 |
| 20 March 2015 – 15:00 | Beitar Tel Aviv Ramla | Home | 1–1 | Malka | 14 |
| 27 March 2015 – 16:00 | Bnei Yehuda | Away | 2–2 | Abudi, Malka | 14 |

==== Relegation group ====
| Date | Opponent | Venue | Result | Scorers | Position |
|---|---|---|---|---|---|
| 13 April 2015 – 18:00 | Maccabi Herzliya | Away | 3–0 | Malka (2), Naor Abudi | 14 |
| 17 April 2015 – 15:00 | Hapoel Jerusalem | Home | 1–0 | Deri | 14 |
| 27 April 2015 – 18:00 | Hakoah Amidar Ramat Gan | Away | 0–1 | | 14 |
| 1 May 2015 – 16:00 | Beitar Tel Aviv Ramla | Away | 0–2 | | 14 |
| 11 May 2015 – 18:00 | Ironi Tiberias | Home | 1–2 | Basit | 14 |
| 15 May 2015 – 16:00 | Hapoel Ramat HaSharon | Away | 0–1 | | 14 |
| 22 May 2015 – 16:00 | Hapoel Rishon LeZion | Home | 2–1 | Sidorenco, Basit | 14 |

Hapoel Nazareth Illit finished 14th and had to face a Liga Alef opponent for a promotion/relegation play-off.

==== Promotion/relegation play-off ====
| Date | Opponent | Venue | Result | Scorers | Position |
|---|---|---|---|---|---|
| 26 May 2015 – 20:00 | Ironi Nesher | Home | 5–0 | Hudeda, Giditz (o.g.), Basit, Owusu, Deri | |
| 29 May 2015 – 15:30 | Ironi Nesher | Away | 0–1 | | |

Hapoel Nazareth Illit won 5–1 on aggregate and remained in Liga Leumit.

=== State Cup ===
| Date | Opponent | Venue | Result | Scorers | Round |
|---|---|---|---|---|---|
| 24 December 2014 – 19:45 | Hapoel Ramat HaSharon | Away | 0–3 | | 6th |

=== League Cup ===
| Date | Opponent | Venue | Result | Scorers | Position |
|---|---|---|---|---|---|
| 12 August 2015 – 19:00 | Ironi Tiberias | Away | 1–3 | Deri | 4 |
| 15 August 2014 – 16:30 | Hapoel Afula | Home | 1–3 | Sidorenco | 4 |
| 19 August 2014 – 19:00 | Ahi Nazareth | Away | 0–3 | | 4 |

Hapoel Nazareth Illit finished fourth and was eliminated.

== Player details ==
List of squad players, including number of appearances by competition

| No. | Pos | Nat | Player | Total | | Liga Leumit | | State Cup | | Toto Cup | |
| No. | Pos | Nat | Player | Apps | Goals | Apps | Goals | Apps | Goals | Apps | Goals |
|---|---|---|---|---|---|---|---|---|---|---|---|
| 1 | GK | (Israel) ISR | Sagi Malul | 5 | 0 | 3 | 0 | 0 | 0 | 2 | 0 |
| 22 | GK | (Israel) ISR | Gil Ofek | 1 | 0 | 0 | 0 | 0 | 0 | 1 | 0 |
| 22 | GK | (Israel) ISR | Ron Shushan | 38 | 0 | 37 | 0 | 1 | 0 | 0 | 0 |
| 2 | DF | (Israel) ISR | Odai Sabbagh | 6 | 0 | 3 | 0 | 0 | 0 | 3 | 0 |
| 3 | DF | (Israel) ISR | Dolev Bek | 2 | 0 | 0 | 0 | 0 | 0 | 2 | 0 |
| 4 | DF | (Israel) ISR | Eliran Hudeda | 40 | 6 | 38 | 6 | 0 | 0 | 2 | 0 |
| 5 | DF | (Israel) ISR | Jenia Berkman | 38 | 4 | 35 | 4 | 1 | 0 | 2 | 0 |
| 6 | DF | (Israel) ISR | Niv Sardal | 35 | 0 | 34 | 0 | 1 | 0 | 0 | 0 |
| 7 | DF | (England) ENG | Elior Kakiashvili | 3 | 0 | 0 | 0 | 0 | 0 | 3 | 0 |
| 8 | DF | (Israel) ISR | Ilya Karasik | 2 | 0 | 0 | 0 | 0 | 0 | 2 | 0 |
| 15 | DF | (Israel) ISR | Niran Rotstein | 28 | 0 | 27 | 0 | 1 | 0 | 0 | 0 |
| 7 | MF | (Israel) ISR | Eran Malkin | 26 | 4 | 26 | 4 | 0 | 0 | 0 | 0 |
| 8 | MF | (Israel) ISR | Yehuda Zano | 37 | 0 | 34 | 0 | 1 | 0 | 2 | 0 |
| 8 | MF | (Israel) ISR | Dolev Azulay | 1 | 0 | 0 | 0 | 0 | 0 | 1 | 0 |
| 10 | MF | (Israel) ISR | Yarden Cohen | 13 | 0 | 12 | 0 | 1 | 0 | 0 | 0 |
| 11 | MF | (Israel) ISR | Naor Abudi | 40 | 5 | 38 | 5 | 1 | 0 | 1 | 0 |
| 14 | MF | (Israel) ISR | Yaniv Deri | 37 | 6 | 34 | 5 | 1 | 0 | 2 | 1 |
| 15 | MF | (Israel) ISR | Ben Guedj | 1 | 0 | 0 | 0 | 0 | 0 | 1 | 0 |
| 16 | MF | (Israel) ISR | Yaniv Brik | 21 | 3 | 20 | 3 | 0 | 0 | 1 | 0 |
| 20 | MF | (Israel) ISR | Afik Cohen | 9 | 0 | 6 | 0 | 0 | 0 | 3 | 0 |
| 21 | MF | (Israel) ISR | Liad Elmaliach | 37 | 0 | 36 | 0 | 1 | 0 | 0 | 0 |
| 25 | MF | (Israel) ISR | Ohad Rabinovich | 4 | 0 | 1 | 0 | 1 | 0 | 2 | 0 |
| 28 | MF | (Israel) ISR | Reuven Gal | 35 | 0 | 32 | 0 | 1 | 0 | 2 | 0 |
| 10 | FW | (Israel) ISR | Moti Malka | 13 | 5 | 13 | 5 | 0 | 0 | 0 | 0 |
| 11 | FW | (Israel) ISR | Aviv Cohen | 6 | 0 | 3 | 0 | 0 | 0 | 3 | 0 |
| 13 | FW | (Ghana) GHA | Ibrahim Aminu Mohammed | 3 | 0 | 0 | 0 | 0 | 0 | 3 | 0 |
| 16 | FW | (Israel) ISR | Urwa Suleiman | 3 | 0 | 1 | 0 | 0 | 0 | 2 | 0 |
| 17 | FW | (Israel) ISR | Ofir Ben-David | 1 | 0 | 0 | 0 | 0 | 0 | 1 | 0 |
| 17 | FW | (Ghana) GHA | William Owusu | 30 | 4 | 29 | 4 | 1 | 0 | 0 | 0 |
| 20 | FW | (Moldova) MDA | Eugen Sidorenco | 33 | 4 | 32 | 3 | 0 | 0 | 1 | 1 |
| 23 | FW | (Israel) ISR | Alon Ohana | 1 | 0 | 0 | 0 | 0 | 0 | 1 | 0 |
| 77 | FW | (Israel) ISR | Haitam Halabi | 20 | 0 | 19 | 0 | 1 | 0 | 0 | 0 |
| 99 | FW | (Ghana) GHA | Ibrahim Basit | 27 | 4 | 26 | 4 | 1 | 0 | 0 | 0 |

== Transfers ==
In:

| No. | Pos. | Nation | Player |
|---|---|---|---|
| — | DF | (Israel) ISR | Daniel Patiaka (Promoted from youth team) |
| — | FW | (Israel) ISR | Liran Sabah (Promoted from youth team) |
| — | FW | (Israel) ISR | Ben Guedj (Promoted from youth team) |
| — | DF | (Israel) ISR | Ahmed Hadaraj (Promoted from youth team) |
| — | MF | (Israel) ISR | Elad Suissa (Promoted from youth team) |
| — | MF | (Israel) ISR | Sahar Cohen (Promoted from youth team) |
| — | DF | (Israel) ISR | Elieor Kakiashvili (Promoted from youth team) |
| — | MF | (Ghana) GHA | William Owusu (On loan from (Israel) F.C. Ashdod) |
| — | DF | (Israel) ISR | Niv Serdal (on loan from (Israel) Hapoel Haifa) |
| — | MF | (Israel) ISR | Naor Abudi (on loan from (Israel) Hapoel Ironi Kiryat Shmona) |
| — | MF | (Israel) ISR | Eran Malkin (on loan from (Israel) Maccabi Haifa) |
| — | MF | (Israel) ISR | Liad Elmaliah (Free transfer) |
| — | DF | (Israel) ISR | Niran Rotstein (Free transfer) |
| — | DF | (Israel) ISR | Niv Serdal (on loan from (Israel) Hapoel Haifa) |
| — | FW | (Moldova) MDA | Eugen Sidorenco (on loan from (Russia) Tom Tomsk) |
| — | GK | (Israel) ISR | Ron Shushan (on loan from (Israel) Maccabi Haifa) |
| — | FW | (Israel) ISR | Haitam Halabi (on loan from (Israel) Maccabi Haifa) |
| — | FW | (Israel) ISR | Yaniv Brik (on loan from (Israel) Maccabi Haifa) |
| — | FW | (Israel) ISR | Moti Malka (from (Israel) Ironi Nesher) |

Out:

| No. | Pos. | Nation | Player |
|---|---|---|---|
| — | MF | (Israel) ISR | Rotem Shmul (to (Israel) Ironi Tiberias) |
| — | MF | (Israel) ISR | Shalev Braver (Loaned to (Israel) Ironi Tiberias) |
| — | MF | (Israel) ISR | Eran Rosenbaum (to (Israel) Hapoel Ra'anana) |
| — | DF | (Israel) ISR | Luhab Kayal (to (Israel) Hapoel Bneil Lod) |
| — | MF | (Israel) ISR | Ram Sofer (Loaned to (Israel) Hapoel Asi Gilboa) |
| — | DF | (Israel) ISR | Meidan Steinberg (Loaned to (Israel) F.C. Karmiel Safed) |
| — | FW | (Israel) ISR | Sagi Hayat (Loaned to (Israel) F.C. Haifa) |
| — | FW | (Israel) ISR | Yotam Cohen (loaned to (Israel) Hapoel Migdal HaEmek) |
| — | DF | (Israel) ISR | Anan Tuama (to (Israel) F.C. Julis) |
| — | GK | (Israel) ISR | Shuki Birani (loaned to (Israel) Maccabi Daliyat al-Karmel) |
| — | GK | (Israel) ISR | Gil Ofek (to (Israel) Ironi Kiryat Ata) |
| — | MF | (Israel) ISR | Shadi Saleh (loaned to (Israel) Hapoel Iksal) |
| — | MF | (Israel) ISR | Mohammad Ghadir (Free agent) |
| — | MF | (Israel) ISR | Sahar Cohen (Free agent) |
| — | FW | (Israel) ISR | Aviv Cohen (loaned to (Israel) Hapoel Migdal HaEmek) |
| — | MF | (Israel) ISR | Iyad Salabis (to F.C. Tzeirei Kafr Kanna) |
| — | FW | (Israel) ISR | Sharon Levy (loaned to (Israel) Hapoel Ramot Menashe Megiddo) |
| — | MF | (Israel) ISR | Yarden Cohen (loaned to (Israel) Ironi Tiberias) |
| — | MF | (Israel) ISR | Mor Amsalem (loaned to (Israel) Hapoel Migdal HaEmek) |
