= 2015–16 Hapoel Nazareth Illit F.C. season =

Hapoel Nazareth Illit
2015–16 season
- Chairman: Oved Grinfeld
- Manager: Ofer Talker; Shimon Edri
- Stadium: Green Stadium
- Liga Leumit: 13th
- State Cup: 8th round
- 2015–16 Toto Cup Leumit: 4th, Group stage
- Top goalscorer: League: 4 players (6); All: Yarden Cohen (8)
Home colours	Away colours	Third colours

The 2015–16 season was Hapoel Nazareth Illit's 53rd football season since its establishment, and the seventh consecutive season in Liga Leumit.

During the season the club struggled in the bottom of Liga Leumit, spending many weeks at bottom place. However, a resurgence inspired by a manager change lifted the club to a 13th-place finish, 8 points above the relegation zone.

== Matches ==
=== League ===
==== Regular season ====
Date	Opponent	Venue	Result	Scorers	Position
21 August 2015 – 16:30	Hapoel Rishon LeZion	Away	1–3	Hudeda	13
28 August 2015 – 16:30	Hapoel Katamon Jerusalem	Home	1–2	Ross	14
18 September 2015 – 16:00	Hapoel Petah Tikva	Away	1–2	Malka	15
25 September 2015 – 15:30	Maccabi Yavne	Home	0–2		15
2 October 2015 – 16:00	Hapoel Ashkelon	Away	1–1	Y. Cohen	16
12 October 2015 – 18:00	Hapoel Ramat HaSharon	Home	2–1	Owusu, Malka	16
19 October 2015 – 19:00	Hapoel Ramat Gan	Away	2–1	Berkman, Carlos Ross	13
26 October 2015 – 18:00	Beitar Tel Aviv Ramla	Home	1–2	Ross	14
2 November 2015 – 18:30	Hapoel Afula	Away	1–1	Zano	14
6 November 2015 – 15:00	Hapoel Jerusalem	Home	2–1	Malka (2)	13
13 November 2015 – 15:00	Maccabi Herzliya	Away	1–1	Malka	12
20 November 2015 – 15:00	F.C. Ashdod	Away	0–0		12
30 November 2015 – 18:00	Maccabi Ahi Nazareth	Home	1–2	Hudeda	12
7 December 2015 – 18:00	Hapoel Bnei Lod	Away	0–0		14
14 December 2015 – 18:00	Maccabi Kiryat Gat	Home	1–2	Owusu	14
18 December 2015 – 15:00	Hapoel Rishon LeZion	Home	0–4		15
25 December 2015 – 15:00	Hapoel Katamon Jerusalem	Away	1–2	Sidorenco	16
5 January 2016 – 18:00	Hapoel Petah Tikva	Home	1–1	Malka	15
8 January 2016 – 14:00	Maccabi Yavne	Away	2–3	Y. Cohen, Owusu	16
18 January 2016 – 18:00	Hapoel Ashkelon	Home	0–1		16
25 January 2016 – 18:00	Hapoel Ramat HaSharon	Away	0–1		16
1 February 2016 – 18:00	Hapoel Ramat Gan	Home	0–0		16
5 February 2016 – 15:00	Beitar Tel Aviv Ramla	Away	0–0		16
12 February 2016 – 15:00	Hapoel Afula	Home	1–1	Mawuli	16
19 February 2016 – 15:00	Hapoel Jerusalem	Away	2–1	Y. Cohen, Atar	15
29 February 2016 – 18:00	Maccabi Herzliya	Home	2–0	Y. Cohen, Atar	14
4 March 2016 – 15:00	F.C. Ashdod	Home	0–2		15
11 March 2016 – 14:30	Maccabi Ahi Nazareth	Away	0–3		15
21 March 2016 – 18:00	Hapoel Bnei Lod	Home	0–0		15
4 April 2016 – 18:00	Maccabi Kiryat Gat	Away	2–0	Owusu, Y. Cohen	15

==== Relegation group ====
Date	Opponent	Venue	Result	Scorers	Position
11 April 2016 – 19:00	Hapoel Afula	Away	4–1	Hudeda, Amsis, Atar, Biton	15
15 April 2016 – 16:00	Hapoel Rishon LeZion	Home	2–1	Owusu, Amsis	13
25 April 2016 – 19:10	Hapoel Ramat HaSharon	Away	2–1	Hudeda (2)	13
2 May 2016 – 19:10	Maccabi Kiryat Gat	Home	6–1	Amsis (3), Atar (2), Solomon	13
9 May 2016 – 19:00	Hapoel Jerusalem	Away	0–3		14
13 May 2016 – 16:00	Maccabi Yavne	Away	4–0	Y. Cohen, Amsis, Atar, Biton	13
20 May 2016 – 16:00	Beitar Tel Aviv Ramla	Home	0–0		13

=== State Cup ===
Date	Opponent	Venue	Result	Scorers	Round
22 December 2015 – 20:00	Ironi Nesher	Home	2–2 (4–3 p)	Amzaleg, Brik	7th
13 January 2016 – 19:00	Hapoel Tel Aviv	Home	3–3 (2–4 p)	Malka, Malkin, Mawuli	8th

=== League Cup ===
Date	Opponent	Venue	Result	Scorers	Position
12 August 2015 – 19:00	Hapoel Afula	Away	1–3	Deri	4
15 August 2014 – 16:30	Maccabi Ahi Nazareth	Home	1–3	Sidorenco	4
19 August 2014 – 19:00	Maccabi Herzliya	Away	0–3		4

Hapoel Nazareth Illit finished fourth and was eliminated.

== Player details ==
List of squad players, including number of appearances by competition

No.	Pos	Nat	Player	Total		Liga Leumit		State Cup		Toto Cup	
No.	Pos	Nat	Player	Apps	Goals	Apps	Goals	Apps	Goals	Apps	Goals
1		(Israel) ISR	Ron Shushan	39	0	35	0	2	0	2	0
2		(Israel) ISR	Odai Sabbagh	1	0	0	0	0	0	1	0
4		(Israel) ISR	Eliran Hudeda	40	5	35	5	2	0	3	0
5		(Israel) ISR	Jenia Berkman	39	1	35	1	1	0	3	0
6		(Israel) ISR	Omer Levinger	1	0	1	0	0	0	0	0
6		(Israel) ISR	Niv Sardal	15	0	14	0	1	0	0	0
7		(Israel) ISR	Yaniv Brik	21	1	18	0	1	1	2	0
7		(Israel) ISR	Roi Atar	15	6	15	6	0	0	0	0
8		(Israel) ISR	Yehuda Zano	35	1	31	1	1	0	3	0
9		(Israel) ISR	Yarden Cohen	38	6	34	6	2	0	2	0
10		(Israel) ISR	Moti Malka	21	7	18	6	1	1	2	0
11		(Israel) ISR	Dolev Bek	1	0	0	0	0	0	1	0
11		(Israel) ISR	Aviv Solomon	30	1	27	1	1	0	2	0
12		(Israel) ISR	Dolev Azulai	14	0	12	0	1	0	1	0
12		(Argentina) ARG	Mariano Nicolás Suárez	1	0	0	0	0	0	1	0
13		(Israel) ISR	Afik Cohen	7	0	7	0	0	0	0	0
14		(Colombia) COL	Raúl Asprilla	3	0	1	0	0	0	2	0
14		(Israel) ISR	George Amsis	12	6	11	6	1	0	0	0
15		(Israel) ISR	Amit Amzaleg	34	1	31	0	1	1	2	0
16		(Ghana) GHA	Owusu	34	5	32	5	2	0	0	0
16		(Israel) ISR	Ilya Karasik	1	0	1	0	0	0	0	0
17		(Israel) ISR	Oren Biton	39	2	35	2	2	0	2	0
20		(Israel) ISR	Liad Elmaliach	39	0	35	0	2	0	2	0
20		(Israel) ISR	Ohad Rabinovich	1	0	0	0	0	0	1	0
22		(Israel) ISR	Sagi Malul	3	0	2	0	0	0	1	0
23		(Israel) ISR	Yaniv Deri	6	0	3	0	0	0	3	0
23		(Israel) ISR	Tariko Getahon	8	0	7	0	1	0	0	0
23		(Israel) ISR	Bar Cohen	1	0	0	0	0	0	1	0
24		(Honduras) HON	Orental Bodden	1	0	0	0	0	0	1	0
25		(Chile) CHI	Carlos Ross	19	3	15	3	1	0	3	0
25		(Argentina) ARG	Mauricio Aubone	8	0	8	0	0	0	0	0
26		(Israel) ISR	Yaden Pinto	3	0	1	0	0	0	2	0
26		(Israel) ISR	Tomer Sadan	2	0	2	0	0	0	0	0
28		(Israel) ISR	Reuven Gal	22	0	17	0	2	0	3	0
32		(Moldova) MDA	Eugen Sidorenco	5	1	4	1	1	0	0	0
41		(Ghana) GHA	Mawuli	8	2	7	1	1	1	0	0
44		(Israel) ISR	Aviv Levy	1	0	1	0	0	0	0	0
55		(Lithuania) LTU	Mindaugas Kalonas	4	0	4	0	0	0	0	0
70		(Israel) ISR	Eran Malkin	20	1	17	0	1	1	2	0

== Transfers ==
In:

Date	Player	Releasing team
16 August 2015	Omer Levinger	Beitar Nahariya
17 August 2015	Yarden Pinto	Hapoel Hod HaSharon
17 August 2015	Amit Amzaleg	Hapoel Tel Aviv
17 August 2015	Aviv Solomon	Maccabi Ironi Kiryat Ata
8 September 2015	Aviv Levy	Ironi Tibieras
2 November 2015	Tariko Getahon	Hapoel Haifa
22 November 2015	Eden Gendler	Hapoel Ramat HaSharon
14 January 2016	Tomer Sadan	Hapoel Haifa
1 February 2016	Roi Atar	Hapoel Ra'anana

Out:

Date	Player	Releasing team
27 August 2015	Ben Biyamin	Hapoel Ramot Menashe Megiddo
2 September 2015	Niran Rotstein	Hapoel Migdal HaEmek
10 September 2015	Shalev Braver	Ironi Nesher
9 November 2015	Yarden Pinto	Hapoel Hod HaSharon
18 January 2016	Idan Lazimi	F.C. Nazareth Illit
3 February 2016	Aviv Levy	Hapoel Rishon LeZion
