= 2014–15 Liga Alef =

Israeli football season

The 2014–15 Liga Alef season saw Hapoel Katamon Jerusalem (champions of the North Division) and Hapoel Ashkelon (champions of the South Division) win the title and promotion to Liga Leumit.

The clubs which were ranked between 2nd to 5th places in each division competed in a promotion play-offs, in which the winners, Ironi Nesher, advanced to the final round, where they lost 1-5 on aggregate to the 14th placed club in Liga Leumit, Hapoel Nazareth Illit. Thus, Ironi Nesher remained in Liga Alef.

At the bottom, the bottom two clubs in each division, Beitar Nahariya, Maccabi Umm al-Fahm (from North division), Maccabi Be'er Sheva and Maccabi Kiryat Malakhi (from South division) were all automatically relegated to Liga Bet, whilst the two clubs which were ranked in 14th place in each division, Hapoel Asi Gilboa and Maccabi Kabilio Jaffa entered a promotion/relegation play-offs. Maccabi Kabilio Jaffa prevailing to stay in Liga Alef, while Hapoel Asi Gilboa were relegated after losing the play-offs.

== Changes from last season ==
=== Team changes ===
- Hapoel Kfar Saba, Maccabi Kiryat Gat and Ironi Tiberias were promoted to Liga Leumit; Hapoel Katamon Jerusalem, Maccabi Umm al-Fahm (to North division), and Hapoel Ashkelon (to South division) were relegated from Liga Leumit.
- Hapoel Daliyat al-Karmel, Maccabi Kafr Kanna and Ahva Arraba were relegated to Liga Bet from North division; Ihud Bnei Majd al-Krum, Ironi Nesher and Maccabi Sektzia Ma'alot-Tarshiha were promoted to the North division from Liga Bet.
- Maccabi Be'er Ya'akov and Bnei Eilat were relegated to Liga Bet from South division, whilst Maccabi Ironi Bat Yam folded; Hapoel Morasha Ramat HaSharon, F.C. Shikun HaMizrah and Hapoel Hod HaSharon were promoted to the South division from Liga Bet.

== North Division ==
| Pos | Team | Pld | W | D | L | GF | GA | GD | Pts | Promotion or relegation |
|---|---|---|---|---|---|---|---|---|---|---|
| 1 | Hapoel Katamon | 30 | 21 | 6 | 3 | 74 | 23 | +51 | 69 | Promoted to Liga Leumit |
| 2 | Ironi Nesher | 30 | 18 | 9 | 3 | 52 | 15 | +37 | 63 | Promotion play-offs |
| 3 | Hapoel Herzliya | 30 | 19 | 5 | 6 | 67 | 28 | +39 | 62 | Promotion play-offs |
| 4 | Hapoel Beit She'an | 30 | 15 | 8 | 7 | 57 | 29 | +28 | 53 | Promotion play-offs |
| 5 | Hapoel Migdal HaEmek | 30 | 14 | 7 | 9 | 46 | 35 | +11 | 49 | Promotion play-offs |
| 6 | F.C. Givat Olga | 30 | 13 | 9 | 8 | 35 | 24 | +11 | 48 | |
| 7 | Maccabi Ironi Kiryat Ata | 30 | 14 | 4 | 12 | 49 | 37 | +12 | 46 | |
| 8 | Maccabi Daliyat al-Karmel | 30 | 10 | 9 | 11 | 40 | 33 | +7 | 39 | |
| 9 | Hapoel Hadera | 30 | 10 | 7 | 13 | 39 | 38 | +1 | 37 | |
| 10 | Maccabi Sektzia Ma'alot-Tarshiha | 30 | 10 | 6 | 14 | 40 | 52 | −12 | 36 | |
| 11 | Maccabi Tzur Shalom | 30 | 10 | 5 | 15 | 25 | 49 | −24 | 35 | |
| 12 | F.C. Karmiel Safed | 30 | 8 | 10 | 12 | 33 | 35 | −2 | 34 | |
| 13 | Ihud Bnei Majd al-Krum | 30 | 8 | 9 | 13 | 31 | 40 | −9 | 33 | |
| 14 | Hapoel Asi Gilboa | 30 | 6 | 12 | 12 | 22 | 32 | −10 | 30 | Relegation play-offs |
| 15 | Beitar Nahariya | 30 | 8 | 5 | 17 | 35 | 39 | −4 | 29 | Relegated to Liga Bet |
| 16 | Maccabi Umm al-Fahm | 30 | 0 | 1 | 29 | 10 | 146 | −136 | 0 (Note: Maccabi Umm al-Fahm were deducted one point for fielding ineligible player.) | Relegated to Liga Bet |

=== Results ===
| Home \ Away | BNH | GOL | HKS | ASG | HBN | HHD | HHE | HKN | HME | IBM | INE | MDK | IKA | SMT | MTz | MUF |
|---|---|---|---|---|---|---|---|---|---|---|---|---|---|---|---|---|
| Beitar Nahariya | | 0–2 | 2–2 | 0–0 | 0–1 | 1–1 | 2–3 | 2–0 | 1–2 | 0–2 | 1–1 | 0–0 | 0–1 | 1–2 | 1–2 | 7–0 |
| F.C. Givat Olga | 1–0 | | 1–3 | 1–1 | 4–3 | 0–1 | 1–0 | 0–2 | 2–0 | 1–0 | 0–0 | 0–2 | 1–1 | 0–1 | 0–0 | 3–0 |
| F.C. Karmiel Safed | 1–0 | 3–0 | | 1–1 | 0–0 | 2–0 | 1–2 | 0–2 | 1–2 | 0–0 | 1–2 | 0–0 | 1–1 | 1–1 | 2–0 | 3–2 |
| Hapoel Asi Gilboa | 1–2 | 0–1 | 1–0 | | 1–1 | 1–0 | 0–3 | 0–2 | 0–0 | 1–1 | 0–1 | 1–2 | 0–2 | 1–1 | 0–0 | 2–1 |
| Hapoel Beit She'an | 4–1 | 0–0 | 5–0 | 0–2 | | 1–1 | 1–3 | 2–2 | 4–0 | 0–0 | 1–0 | 0–0 | 0–1 | 2–1 | 1–0 | 11–0 |
| Hapoel Hadera | 4–0 | 0–4 | 2–0 | 2–2 | 2–1 | | 1–3 | 1–2 | 1–1 | 0–1 | 0–0 | 1–1 | 2–4 | 2–1 | 3–0 | 5–0 |
| Hapoel Herzliya | 2–0 | 2–1 | 3–1 | 2–0 | 1–2 | 1–0 | | 1–1 | 2–0 | 1–1 | 1–2 | 5–1 | 0–3 | 5–2 | 4–0 | 2–0 |
| Hapoel Katamon Jerusalem | 1–0 | 2–1 | 2–0 | 4–0 | 3–1 | 1–0 | 1–2 | | 1–1 | 1–0 | 0–0 | 1–1 | 4–2 | 3–1 | 5–1 | 13–0 |
| Hapoel Migdal HaEmek | 2–1 | 1–1 | 0–1 | 1–2 | 0–2 | 2–0 | 2–1 | 1–1 | | 5–1 | 1–0 | 1–1 | 2–0 | 1–2 | 5–0 | 3–0 |
| Ihud Bnei Majd al-Krum | 0–3 | 0–3 | 1–1 | 2–0 | 1–3 | 1–1 | 0–3 | 2–3 | 2–2 | | 2–2 | 3–0 | 0–2 | 3–0 | 0–1 | 0–0 |
| Ironi Nesher | 2–1 | 0–0 | 2–0 | 0–0 | 1–1 | 2–0 | 2–0 | 2–0 | 3–0 | 1–2 | | 2–1 | 2–0 | 1–0 | 0–0 | 12–0 |
| Maccabi Daliyat al-Karmel | 0–1 | 0–2 | 1–1 | 0–0 | 4–1 | 0–2 | 0–0 | 1–2 | 0–1 | 1–0 | 1–2 | | 2–1 | 1–3 | 1–0 | 13–1 |
| Maccabi Kiryat Ata | 0–2 | 0–0 | 1–0 | 1–0 | 0–2 | 2–0 | 2–2 | 0–2 | 1–2 | 3–1 | 0–1 | 0–2 | | 5–2 | 0–2 | 6–2 |
| Maccabi Sektzia Ma'alot-Tarshiha | 2–1 | 2–2 | 2–2 | 1–0 | 0–2 | 1–5 | 1–1 | 0–1 | 1–3 | 2–1 | 0–1 | 1–2 | 2–1 | | 1–1 | 4–0 |
| Maccabi Tzur Shalom | 0–3 | 0–1 | 1–0 | 0–0 | 0–2 | 2–0 | 0–2 | 1–6 | 3–2 | 0–1 | 0–4 | 1–0 | 1–3 | 2–1 | | 4–0 |
| Maccabi Umm al-Fahm | 0–2 | 0–2 | 0–5 | 0–5 | 1–3 | 1–2 | 0–10 | 0–6 | 0–3 | 0–3 | 2–4 | 0–2 | 0–6 | 1–2 | 1–3 | |

Updated to match(es) played on 1 May 2015. Source: Israel Football Association
Legend: Blue = home team win; Yellow = draw; Red = away team win.
Notes:

^{2} The Israel Football Association declared the match a 3–0 technical win for Hapoel Migdal HaEmek after Maccabi Umm al-Fahm failed to fulfill the home team duties.

== South Division ==
| Pos | Team | Pld | W | D | L | GF | GA | GD | Pts | Promotion or relegation |
|---|---|---|---|---|---|---|---|---|---|---|
| 1 | Hapoel Ashkelon | 30 | 21 | 8 | 1 | 52 | 15 | +37 | 71 | Promoted to Liga Leumit |
| 2 | Maccabi Sha'arayim | 30 | 17 | 8 | 5 | 45 | 23 | +22 | 59 | Promotion play-offs |
| 3 | Sektzia Nes Tziona | 30 | 12 | 10 | 8 | 56 | 47 | +9 | 46 | Promotion play-offs |
| 4 | Hapoel Marmorek | 30 | 14 | 4 | 12 | 40 | 37 | +3 | 46 | Promotion play-offs |
| 5 | Beitar Kfar Saba | 30 | 12 | 9 | 9 | 49 | 42 | +7 | 45 | Promotion play-offs |
| 6 | Hapoel Mahane Yehuda | 30 | 12 | 8 | 10 | 45 | 34 | +11 | 44 | |
| 7 | Hapoel Kfar Shalem | 30 | 9 | 12 | 9 | 37 | 33 | +4 | 39 | |
| 8 | Hapoel Hod HaSharon | 30 | 10 | 8 | 12 | 42 | 43 | −1 | 38 | |
| 9 | F.C. Kafr Qasim | 30 | 9 | 10 | 11 | 35 | 39 | −4 | 37 | |
| 10 | Hapoel Morasha | 30 | 8 | 12 | 10 | 30 | 34 | −4 | 36 | |
| 11 | F.C. Shikun HaMizrah | 30 | 7 | 14 | 9 | 38 | 42 | −4 | 35 | |
| 12 | Maccabi Amishav Petah Tikva | 30 | 9 | 8 | 13 | 29 | 40 | −11 | 35 | |
| 13 | Hapoel Azor | 30 | 8 | 10 | 12 | 26 | 40 | −14 | 34 | |
| 14 | Maccabi Kabilio Jaffa | 30 | 6 | 12 | 12 | 28 | 32 | −4 | 30 | Relegation play-offs |
| 15 | Maccabi Be'er Sheva | 30 | 6 | 9 | 15 | 39 | 61 | −22 | 27 | Relegated to Liga Bet |
| 16 | Maccabi Kiryat Malakhi | 30 | 6 | 6 | 18 | 23 | 52 | −29 | 15 (Note: Maccabi Kiryat Malakhi were deducted nine points for entering administration.) | Relegated to Liga Bet |

=== Results ===
| Home \ Away | BKS | FKQ | FCS | HAS | HAZ | HHH | KSL | HMY | HMK | HMO | MAP | MBS | MKJ | MSH | SNT | MKM |
|---|---|---|---|---|---|---|---|---|---|---|---|---|---|---|---|---|
| Beitar Kfar Saba | | 2–2 | 0–0 | 1–3 | 0–0 | 2–2 | 2–1 | 2–1 | 2–1 | 2–0 | 0–0 | 6–3 | 1–0 | 4–1 | 1–2 | 2–0 |
| F.C. Kafr Qasim | 1–1 | | 0–0 | 0–2 | 4–1 | 1–1 | 1–1 | 3–2 | 0–1 | 2–0 | 1–3 | 3–1 | 1–1 | 0–2 | 0–3 | 2–0 |
| F.C. Shikun HaMizrah | 2–0 | 1–1 | | 3–4 | 0–1 | 3–0 | 1–1 | 1–2 | 3–2 | 2–2 | 2–2 | 0–2 | 0–0 | 1–4 | 2–2 | 2–1 |
| Hapoel Ashkelon | 3–0 | 1–0 | 2–0 | | 0–0 | 2–0 | 2–0 | 0–0 | 2–0 | 3–1 | 1–0 | 4–1 | 2–0 | 2–2 | 2–2 | 2–0 |
| Hapoel Azor | 1–4 | 0–1 | 1–1 | 0–0 | | 2–1 | 1–2 | 0–3 | 0–1 | 0–0 | 0–1 | 3–2 | 0–2 | 0–0 | 3–1 | 1–1 |
| Hapoel Hod HaSharon | 3–1 | 2–1 | 4–1 | 1–1 | 5–0 | | 0–3 | 1–2 | 3–0 | 1–3 | 0–2 | 2–2 | 1–0 | 0–0 | 1–3 | 3–2 |
| Hapoel Kfar Shalem | 2–1 | 1–3 | 1–3 | 0–0 | 0–0 | 0–1 | | 0–0 | 1–1 | 3–2 | 1–1 | 1–1 | 0–0 | 1–2 | 1–1 | 2–0 |
| Hapoel Mahane Yehuda | 4–1 | 2–2 | 1–2 | 0–2 | 1–3 | 1–0 | 0–1 | | 2–1 | 1–1 | 2–0 | 4–3 | 1–1 | 0–0 | 3–0 | 5–0 |
| Hapoel Marmorek | 1–1 | 2–0 | 0–1 | 0–2 | 2–3 | 2–0 | 1–3 | 2–0 | | 0–2 | 2–0 | 2–1 | 2–1 | 2–0 | 2–2 | 2–0 |
| Hapoel Morasha Ramat HaSharon | 0–3 | 0–0 | 1–0 | 2–0 | 0–0 | 2–1 | 4–2 | 2–1 | 1–2 | | 0–2 | 1–1 | 0–1 | 0–0 | 0–1 | 1–1 |
| Maccabi Amishav Petah Tikva | 1–1 | 1–0 | 2–2 | 1–3 | 0–1 | 0–0 | 1–1 | 0–2 | 2–0 | 0–1 | | 0–1 | 1–0 | 0–4 | 1–4 | 1–0 |
| Maccabi Be'er Sheva | 2–1 | 0–1 | 2–2 | 0–2 | 2–1 | 1–1 | 0–5 | 1–1 | 1–2 | 1–1 | 1–3 | | 1–1 | 0–1 | 4–2 | 4–1 |
| Maccabi Kabilio Jaffa | 3–0 | 1–2 | 1–1 | 0–0 | 4–1 | 1–0 | 1–2 | 2–3 | 1–1 | 1–1 | 2–2 | 1–1 | | 0–2 | 1–0 | 0–1 |
| Maccabi Sha'arayim | 0–2 | 3–1 | 0–0 | 1–2 | 1–0 | 1–2 | 1–0 | 0–0 | 3–0 | 2–2 | 1–0 | 2–0 | 1–0 | | 3–1 | 2–1 |
| Sektzia Nes Tziona | 2–2 | 4–2 | 1–1 | 0–2 | 0–0 | 3–3 | 2–1 | 2–1 | 0–3 | 1–1 | 4–2 | 6–0 | 3–1 | 1–3 | | 2–0 |
| Maccabi Kiryat Malakhi | 1–4 | 0–0 | 2–1 | 0–1 | 1–3 | 1–3 | 0–0 | 1–0 | 0–3 | 1–0 | 3–0 | 1–0 | 1–1 | 1–3 | 2–2 | |

Updated to match(es) played on 1 May 2015. Source: Israel Football Association
Legend: Blue = home team win; Yellow = draw; Red = away team win.

== Promotion play-offs ==
=== First round ===
Second and third placed clubs played single match at home against the fourth and fifth placed clubs in their respective regional division.

8 May 2015
14:30 UTC+3

| Ironi Nesher | 2 – 2 (a.e.t.) | Hapoel Migdal HaEmek |
|---|---|---|
| Barak 5'; Elkanati 12' | Report (in Hebrew) | Balestra 78'; Frej 85' |
Penalties
| al-Ali (penalty scored); Elkanati (penalty missed); Morjan (penalty scored); Ohayon (penalty scored); Tzhako (penalty scored) | 4–3 | (penalty scored) Malul; (penalty missed) Cohen; (penalty missed) Ohayon; (penalty scored) Frej; (penalty scored) Balestra |

Nesher Stadium, Nesher
Referee: Shahar Arbeli
8 May 2015
14:00 UTC+3

| Hapoel Herzliya | 0 – 1 | Hapoel Beit She'an |
|---|---|---|
| | Report (in Hebrew) | Malka 54' |

Municipal Stadium, Herzliya
Referee: Erez Papir

8 May 2015
15:00 UTC+3

| Maccabi Sha'arayim | 0 – 0 (a.e.t.) | Beitar Kfar Saba |
|---|---|---|
| | Report (in Hebrew) |
Penalties
| Karagula (penalty scored); Yosef (penalty missed); Reuven (penalty scored); Ovadia (penalty missed) | 2–4 | (penalty scored) Berkovic; (penalty missed) Revivo; (penalty scored) Shani; (penalty scored) Atias; (penalty scored) Alon |

Municipal Stadium, Lod
Referee: Oren Siminyan
8 May 2015
15:00 UTC+3

| Sektzia Nes Tziona | 0 – 2 | Hapoel Marmorek |
|---|---|---|
| | Report (in Hebrew) | Sulimanov 78' 90+3' |

Ness Ziona Stadium, Ness Ziona
Referee: Ziv Adler

Ironi Nesher and Hapoel Beit She'an (from North division) and Hapoel Marmorek and Beitar Kfar Saba (from South division) advanced to the second round.

=== Second round ===
The winners of the first round played single match at home of the higher ranked club (from each regional division).

15 May 2015
14:30 UTC+3

| Ironi Nesher | 2 – 1 | Hapoel Beit She'an |
|---|---|---|
| Kresner 67'; Tzhako 89' | Report (in Hebrew) | Malka 45' |

Nesher Stadium, Nesher
Referee: Idan Layba

15 May 2015
14:30 UTC+3

| Hapoel Marmorek | 0 – 3 | Beitar Kfar Saba |
|---|---|---|
| | Report (in Hebrew) | Revivo 65' 83'; Harari 68' |

Itztoni Stadium, Rehovot
Referee: Zvika Levi

Ironi Nesher and Beitar Kfar Saba advanced to the third round.

=== Third round ===
Ironi Nesher and Beitar Kfar Saba faced each other for a single match in neutral venue. The winner advanced to the fourth round against the 14th placed club in Liga Leumit.

19 May 2015
19:30 UTC+3

| Beitar Kfar Saba | 0 – 1 | Ironi Nesher |
|---|---|---|
| | Report (in Hebrew) | Ben Asur 80' |

Municipal Stadium, Herzliya
Referee: Menashe Masiah

Ironi Nesher advanced to the promotion/relegation play-offs.

=== Fourth round - promotion/relegation play-offs ===
Ironi Nesher faced the 14th placed in 2014–15 Liga Leumit Hapoel Nazareth Illit. The winner on aggregate earned a spot in the 2015–16 Liga Leumit. The matches took place on May 26 and 29, 2015.

26 May 2015
20:00 UTC+3

| Hapoel Nazareth Illit | 5 - 0 | Ironi Nesher |
|---|---|---|
| Hudeda 30' (pen.); Giditz 46' (o.g.); Basit 63'; Owusu 73'; Deri 89' | Report (in Hebrew) |

Green Stadium, Nazareth Illit
Referee: Daniel Bar Natan

29 May 2015
15:30 UTC+3

| Ironi Nesher | 1 - 0 | Hapoel Nazareth Illit |
|---|---|---|
| Shulkowsky 59' | Report (in Hebrew) |

Nesher Stadium, Nesher
Referee: Igal Frid

Hapoel Nazareth Illit won 5–1 on aggregate and remained in Liga Leumit. Ironi Nesher remained in Liga Alef.

== Relegation play-offs ==
=== North play-off ===
The 14th placed club in Liga Alef North, Hapoel Asi Gilboa, faced the Liga Bet North play-offs winner, Hapoel Iksal. the winner earned a spot in the 2015–16 Liga Alef.

12 May 2015
18:00 UTC+3

| Hapoel Iksal | 1 – 0 | Hapoel Asi Gilboa |
|---|---|---|
| Abu Leil 61' | Report (in Hebrew) |

Ilut Stadium, Ilut
Referee: Guy Berger

Hapoel Iksal Promoted to Liga Alef; Hapoel Asi Gilboa relegated to Liga Bet; However, they were eventually reprieved from relegation, following the merger between Hapoel Hadera and F.C. Givat Olga.

=== South play-off ===
The 14th placed club in Liga Alef South, Maccabi Kabilio Jaffa, faced the Liga Bet South play-offs winner, Hapoel Kiryat Ono. the winner earned a spot in the 2015–16 Liga Alef.

12 May 2015
18:00 UTC+3

| Hapoel Kiryat Ono | 0 – 2 | Maccabi Kabilio Jaffa |
|---|---|---|
| | Report (in Hebrew) | Maman 69'; Levi 90' |

Municipal Stadium, Lod
Referee: Gal Leibowitz

Maccabi Kabilio Jaffa remained in Liga Alef; Hapoel Kiryat Ono remained in Liga Bet.
