= 2014–15 Liga Leumit =

Liga Leumit
- Season: 2014–15
- Champions: Bnei Yehuda Tel Aviv
- Promoted: Bnei Yehuda Tel Aviv; Hapoel Kfar Saba
- Relegated: Ironi Tiberias; Hakoah Amidar Ramat Gan
- Matches played: 296
- Goals scored: 739 (2.5 per match)
- Top goalscorer: Pedro Galván (22 goals)
- Biggest home win: Hapoel Bnei Lod 5–0 Beitar Tel Aviv Ramla (14 November 2014); Maccabi Kiryat Gat 5–0 Maccabi Yavne (18 May 2015)
- Biggest away win: Hakoah Ramat Gan 0–6 Hapoel Ramat HaSharon (22 September 2014)
- Highest scoring: Maccabi Ahi Nazareth 3–5 Hapoel Bnei Lod (22 May 2015)
- All statistics correct as of 25 May 2015.

The 2014–15 Liga Leumit was the 16th season as second tier since its re-alignment in 1999 and the 73rd season of second-tier football in Israel.

A total of sixteen teams are contesting in the league, including eleven sides from the 2013–14 season, the three promoted teams from 2013–14 Liga Alef and the two relegated teams from 2013–14 Israeli Premier League.

== Changes from 2013–14 season ==
Location of teams in the 2014–15 Liga Leumit

=== Team changes ===
Maccabi Netanya and Hapoel Petah Tikva, were promoted to the 2014–15 Israeli Premier League.

Hapoel Nir Ramat HaSharon and Bnei Yehuda Tel Aviv were directly relegated to the 2014–15 Liga Leumit after finishing the 2013–14 Israeli Premier League season in the bottom two places.

Hapoel Ashkelon, and Maccabi Umm al-Fahm were directly relegated to Liga Alef after finishing in the previous season in last two league places. They were replaced by Hapoel Kfar Saba and Maccabi Kiryat Gat who finished first their respective 2013–14 Liga Alef Liga Alef. Ironi Tiberias won the Liga Alef playoffs, and after relegation play-offs replaced Hapoel Katamon Jerusalem in Liga Leumit.

== Overview ==
=== Stadia and locations ===
Club	Home City	Stadium	Capacity
Beitar Tel Aviv Ramla	Tel Aviv and Ramla	Ramla Municipal Stadium	2,000
Bnei Yehuda	Tel Aviv	Bloomfield Stadium	14,413
Hakoah Ramat Gan	Ramat Gan	Winter Stadium	8,000
Hapoel Afula	Afula	Afula Illit Stadium	3,000
Hapoel Bnei Lod	Lod	Lod Municipal Stadium	3,000
Hapoel Jerusalem	Jerusalem	Teddy Stadium	31,733
Hapoel Nazareth Illit	Nazareth Illit	Green Stadium	4,000
Hapoel Ramat HaSharon	Ramat HaSharon	Grundman Stadium	4,300
Hapoel Ramat Gan	Ramat Gan	Winter Stadium	8,000
Hapoel Rishon LeZion	Rishon LeZion	Haberfeld Stadium	6,000
Ironi Tiberias	Tiberias	Afula Illit Stadium^{[A]}	3,000
Maccabi Ahi Nazareth	Nazareth	Ilut Stadium	4,932
Maccabi Herzliya	Herzliya	Herzliya Municipal Stadium	8,100
Hapoel Kfar Saba	Kfar Saba	Levita Stadium	5,800
Maccabi Kiryat Gat	Kiryat Gat	Sala Stadium^{[B]}	5,250
Maccabi Yavne	Yavne	Ness Ziona Stadium^{[C]}	3,500

^A The club is playing their home games at a neutral venue because their own ground does not meet Premier League requirements.
^B While Kiryat Gat Municipal Stadium is under construction. Maccabi Kiryat Gat will host their home games in Sala Stadium.
^C While Yavne Municipal Stadium is under construction. Maccabi Yavne will host their home games in Ness Ziona Stadium until January 2014.

== Regular season ==
Pos	Team	Pld	W	D	L	GF	GA	GD	Pts	Promotion or relegation
1	Bnei Yehuda Tel Aviv	30	18	10	2	56	18	+38	64	Qualification for the Promotion playoffs
2	Hapoel Bnei Lod	30	16	9	5	46	25	+21	57	Qualification for the Promotion playoffs
3	Hapoel Kfar Saba	30	15	10	5	45	25	+20	55	Qualification for the Promotion playoffs
4	Hapoel Afula	30	12	10	8	41	32	+9	46	Qualification for the Promotion playoffs
5	Maccabi Kiryat Gat	30	12	8	10	28	24	+4	44	Qualification for the Promotion playoffs
6	Maccabi Ahi Nazareth	30	10	11	9	42	47	−5	41	Qualification for the Promotion playoffs
7	Maccabi Yavne	30	10	10	10	42	46	−4	40	Qualification for the Promotion playoffs
8	Hapoel Ramat Gan	30	10	10	10	30	35	−5	40	Qualification for the Promotion playoffs
9	Hapoel Nir Ramat HaSharon	30	10	9	11	33	33	0	39	Qualification for the Relegation playoffs
10	Hapoel Rishon LeZion	30	11	6	13	41	42	−1	39	Qualification for the Relegation playoffs
11	Maccabi Herzliya	30	10	8	12	37	35	+2	38	Qualification for the Relegation playoffs
12	Hapoel Jerusalem	30	9	11	10	37	41	−4	38	Qualification for the Relegation playoffs
13	Beitar Tel Aviv Ramla	30	9	7	14	30	45	−15	34	Qualification for the Relegation playoffs
14	Hapoel Nazareth Illit	30	6	12	12	34	47	−13	30	Qualification for the Relegation playoffs
15	Ironi Tiberias	30	6	9	15	28	40	−12	27	Qualification for the Relegation playoffs
16	Hakoah Amidar Ramat Gan	30	4	4	22	14	49	−35	16	Qualification for the Relegation playoffs

Source: Israel Football Association
Rules for classification: 1st points; 2nd goal difference; 3rd matches won; 4th goals scored; 5th head-to-head; 6th decision match. Winners of 2014–15 Israel State Cup qualify for the second qualifying round of the UEFA Europa League.

Home \ Away	BTR	BnY	HAR	HAF	HBL	HJE	HKS	HNI	HRH	HRG	HRL	ITI	MAN	MHE	MKG	MYA
Beitar Tel Aviv Ramla		0–4	2–0	3–4	3–0	1–1	0–2	0–2	0–1	1–0	1–4	2–1	2–1	0–0	0–0	0–3
Bnei Yehuda	2–1		3–0	2–1	1–0	0–3 (Note: The match originally was abandoned after supporter violence while the score was 1–1. The Israel Football Association declared the match a 3–0 technical win for Hapoel Jerusalem, with Kęstutis Ivaškevičius being handed a one-match suspension.)	0–0	2–2	3–0	1–1	2–0	2–1	4–0	1–0	0–1	2–0
Hakoah Amidar Ramat Gan	1–0	0–2		0–0	1–2	0–0	1–2	1–2	0–6	1–2	0–1	1–2	1–1	1–0	0–2	1–0
Hapoel Afula	2–1	1–1	3–0		0–3	2–0	2–0	3–1	0–0	1–2	3–2	3–0	0–0	1–0	0–0	0–0
Hapoel Bnei Lod	5–0	1–2	1–0	0–0		1–1	1–1	3–1	0–0	0–0	2–1	1–0	3–1	3–1	2–0	1–3
Hapoel Jerusalem	1–2	1–1	0–2	3–2	1–2		1–3	2–2	2–0	0–3	2–0	4–2	4–2	2–2	1–0	3–3
Hapoel Kfar Saba	1–2	1–1	4–0	4–1	0–2	2–0		1–1	0–0	1–0	1–0	2–0	2–2	1–0	2–2	4–2
Hapoel Nazareth Illit	1–1	1–1	1–0	1–4	0–0	0–0	0–2		1–3	1–1	1–2	3–3	0–0	1–2	0–1	1–2
Hapoel Ramat HaSharon	0–1	0–1	2–1	0–1	1–2	1–0	1–1	2–1		1–1	1–3	2–0	1–1	1–0	1–0	2–1
Hapoel Ramat Gan	1–0	0–4	1–0	2–1	1–1	0–0	1–1	2–1	1–1		0–1	0–1	1–4	2–1	0–0	1–1
Hapoel Rishon LeZion	2–2	1–1	2–0	1–1	1–1	0–1	0–3	4–0	1–0	2–1		1–4	1–3	3–3	1–2	0–1
Ironi Tibieras	2–2	0–1	2–0	0–0	0–2	0–1	0–1	1–1	2–0	0–1	1–2		1–1	0–1	2–1	1–1
Maccabi Ahi Nazareth	0–0	1–6	2–1	2–2	2–0	1–1	2–0	0–2	3–2	2–3	1–0	1–1		2–2	0–3	2–0
Maccabi Herzliya	2–0	0–0	1–0	0–1	2–2	3–1	1–2	2–3	2–0	3–1	3–1	0–0	2–4		2–0	1–0
Maccabi Kiryat Gat	1–0	0–0	1–1	1–0	0–2	0–1	1–0	1–2	2–2	2–0	1–1	2–0	0–1	1–0		2–1
Maccabi Yavne	0–2	1–6	2–0	3–2	1–3	2–2	1–1	1–1	2–2	2–1	2–1	1–1	2–0	1–1	2–1	

Source: Israel Football Association
Legend: Blue = home team win; Yellow = draw; Red = away team win.

== Playoffs ==
Key numbers for pairing determination (number marks position after 30 games):

Rounds
31st	32nd	33rd	34th	35th	36th	37th
1 – 5; 2 – 7; 3 – 6; 4 – 8	1 – 2; 5 – 8; 6 – 4; 7 – 3	2 – 5; 3 – 1; 4 – 7; 8 – 6	1 – 4; 2 – 3; 5 – 6; 7 – 8	3 – 5; 4 – 2; 6 – 7; 8 – 1	1 – 6; 2 – 8; 3 – 4; 5 – 7	4 – 5; 6 – 2; 7 – 1; 8 – 3
9 – 13; 10 – 15; 11 – 14; 12 – 16	9 – 10; 13 – 16; 14 – 12; 15 – 11	10 – 13; 11 – 9; 12 – 15; 16 – 14	9 – 12; 10 – 11; 13 – 14; 15 – 16	11 – 13; 12 – 10; 14 – 15; 16 – 9	9 – 14; 10 – 16; 11 – 12; 13 – 15	12 – 13; 14 – 10; 15 – 9; 16 – 11

=== Top Playoff ===
Pos	Team	Pld	W	D	L	GF	GA	GD	Pts	Promotion
1	Bnei Yehuda Tel Aviv (P)	37	21	13	3	69	26	+43	76	Promotion to Israeli Premier League
2	Hapoel Kfar Saba (P)	37	21	10	6	61	28	+33	73	Promotion to Israeli Premier League
3	Hapoel Bnei Lod	37	20	11	6	56	32	+24	71	
4	Hapoel Afula	37	15	12	10	56	42	+14	57	
5	Maccabi Kiryat Gat	37	13	10	14	36	36	0	49	
6	Hapoel Ramat Gan	37	11	14	12	39	47	−8	47	
7	Maccabi Ahi Nazareth	37	11	12	14	54	67	−13	45	
8	Maccabi Yavne	37	11	12	14	47	62	−15	45	

Source: Israel Football Association
Rules for classification: 1st points; 2nd goal difference; 3rd matches won; 4th goals scored; 5th head-to-head; 6th decision match
(P) Promoted

Home \ Away	BnY	HBL	HKS	HAF	MKG	MAN	MYA	HRG
Bnei Yehuda		0–0		2–1	1–1	5–1		
Hapoel Bnei Lod			0–3		1–0		1–0	2–0
Hapoel Kfar Saba	0–1			2–1	3–0	1–0		
Hapoel Afula		1–1			4–1		4–2	1–1
Maccabi Kiryat Gat						1–3	5–0	0–0
Maccabi Ahi Nazareth		3–5		1–3			1–2	
Maccabi Yavne	1–1		0–4					0–0
Hapoel Ramat Gan	4–3		1–3			3–3		

Source: Israel Football Association
Legend: Blue = home team win; Yellow = draw; Red = away team win.

=== Bottom Playoff ===
Pos	Team	Pld	W	D	L	GF	GA	GD	Pts	Relegation
9	Hapoel Jerusalem	37	12	14	11	47	47	0	50	
10	Hapoel Rishon LeZion	37	13	9	15	51	50	+1	48	
11	Hapoel Nir Ramat HaSharon	37	12	12	13	39	40	−1	48	
12	Beitar Tel Aviv Ramla	37	12	11	14	44	53	−9	47	
13	Maccabi Herzliya	37	11	11	15	42	46	−4	44	
14	Hapoel Nazareth Illit (O)	37	9	12	16	41	54	−13	39	Qualification for the relegation play-offs
15	Ironi Tiberias (R)	37	9	10	18	38	50	−12	37	Relegation to Liga Alef
16	Hakoah Amidar Ramat Gan (R)	37	5	7	25	19	59	−40	22	Relegation to Liga Alef

Source: Israel Football Association
Rules for classification: 1st points; 2nd goal difference; 3rd matches won; 4th goals scored; 5th head-to-head; 6th decision match
(O) Play-off winners; (R) Relegated

Home \ Away	HRH	HRL	MHE	HJE	BTR	HNI	ITI	HAR
Hapoel Ramat HaSharon		4–1		1–1	0–2	1–0		
Hapoel Rishon LeZion			4–0		0–0		2–0	1–1
Maccabi Herzliya	0–0			0–1	1–1	0–3		
Hapoel Jerusalem		1–1			3–3		2–0	2–0
Beitar Tel Aviv Ramla						2–0	3–3	3–1
Hapoel Nazareth Illit		2–1		1–0			1–2	
Ironi Tibieras	3–0		0–2					2–0
Hakoah Amidar Ramat Gan	0–0		2–2			1–0		

Source: Israel Football Association
Legend: Blue = home team win; Yellow = draw; Red = away team win.

== Relegation playoff ==
=== Relegation playoff ===
The 14th-placed Hapoel Nazareth Illit faced 2014–15 Liga Alef promotion play-offs winner, Ironi Nesher. The matches took place on May 26 and 29, 2015.

26 May 2015
20:00 UTC+3

Hapoel Nazareth Illit	5 - 0	Ironi Nesher
Hudeda 30' (pen.); Giditz 46' (o.g.); Basit 63'; Owusu 73'; Deri 89'	Report (in Hebrew)

Green Stadium, Nazareth Illit
Referee: Daniel Bar Natan

29 May 2015
15:30 UTC+3

Ironi Nesher	1 - 0	Hapoel Nazareth Illit
Shulkowsky 59'	Report (in Hebrew)

Nesher Stadium, Nesher
Referee: Igal Frid

Hapoel Nazareth Illit won 5–1 on aggregate and remained in Liga Leumit. Ironi Nesher remained in Liga Alef.

== Season statistics ==
=== Scoring ===
==== Top scorers ====
Rank	Player	Club	Goals
1	(Argentina) Pedro Galván	Bnei Yehuda	22
2	(Israel) Ido Exbard	Maccabi Ahi Nazareth	21
3	(Nigeria) Lanry Kahinda	Hapoel Afula	20
4	(Israel) Ran Itzhak	Hapoel Kfar Saba	17
5	(Israel) Shalom Akiva	Ironi Tiberias	13
6	(France) Jordan Faucher	Maccabi Herzliya	12
7	(Israel) Nevo Mizrahi	Hapoel Jerusalem	11
7	(Israel) Yossi Ofir	Maccabi Yavne	11
9	(Israel) Moshe Ben Lulu	Hapoel Bnei Lod	10
9	(Palestine) Ali Khatib	Maccabi Ahi Nazareth	10
9	(Israel) Omri Shekel	Hapoel Rishon LeZion	10
9	(Israel) Yossi Shivhon	Hapoel Nir Ramat HaSharon	10
9	(Israel) Gal Tzruya	Bnei Yeuhda	10
14	(Israel) Yinon Barda	Hapoel Bnei Lod	9
14	(Israel) Almog Buzaglo	Hapoel Ramat Gan	9
14	(Israel) Idan David	Hapoel Kfar Saba	9
14	(Israel) Liron Elimelech	Ironi Tiberias	9
14	(Israel) Uri Magbo	Beitar Tel Aviv Ramla	9
19	(Israel) Ben Azubel	Hapoel Nir Ramat HaSharon	8
19	(Israel) Liron Diamant	Hapoel Ramat Gan	8
19	(Israel) Eli Elbaz	Maccabi Ahi Nazareth/Ironi Tiberias	8
19	(Togo) Didier Kougbenya	Beitar Tel Aviv Ramla	8
19	(Ivory Coast) Issoumaila Lingane	Hapoel Ramat Gan	8
19	(Serbia) Branko Mihajlović	Hapoel Kfar Saba	8
19	(Israel) Nir Nachum	Hapoel Rishon LeZion	8
26	5 players		7
31	11 players		6
42	13 players		5
55	25 players		4
80	22 players		3
102	23 players		2
125	73 players		1
198	Own goals		10
Total			739
Average per game			2.497

Updated: 25 May 2015
Source: Israel Football Association

=== Discipline ===
- Most yellow cards: 11
  - Osher Abu (Hapoel Jerusalem)
  - Netanel Goldman (Hapoel Afula)
  - Maor Kandil (Hapoel Nir Ramat HaSharon)
- Most red cards: 3
  - Sun Menahem (Hapoel Nir Ramat HaSharon)

== See also ==
- 2014–15 Israel State Cup
