= Edri =

Edri (Hebrew: אדרי) is a surname. Notable people with the surname include:

- Amir Edri (born 1985), Israeli goalkeeper
- Avi Edri (born 1968), Israeli trade unionist
- Kfir Edri (born 1976), Israeli former footballer
- Lior Edri (born 1979), Israeli rabbi and politician
- Rachel Edri of Rachel Edri hostage stand-off, 2023 terror incident in Israel
- Rafael Edri (1937–2024), Israeli former politician
- Shalom Edri (born 1994), Israeli footballer
- Shimon Edri (born 1962), Israeli football manager
- Shlomi Edri (born 1982), Israeli footballer
- Shon Edri (born 2004), Israeli professional footballer
- Yaakov Edri (1950–2026), Israeli politician

== See also ==
- Hadari
