= Yarden Cohen =

Yarden Cohen may refer to:

- Yarden Cohen (footballer, born 1991), Israeli footballer for F.C. Kafr Qasim
- Yarden Cohen (footballer, born 1997), Israeli footballer for Maccabi Petah Tikva
