= Hadari =

Hadari Hebrew: הדרי is a Hebrew surname.

- Avishay Hadari, Israeli artist
- Shimon Hadari, Israeli football manager
- Yeshayahu Hadari, Israeli rabbi

== See also ==
- Hadar (disambiguation)
- Hadary
- Edri
