= William Owusu =

William Owusu may refer to:

- William Owusu (footballer, born 1989), Ghanaian football striker
- William Owusu (footballer, born 1991), Ghanaian football midfielder
