= Boni Ginzburg =

Israeli footballer

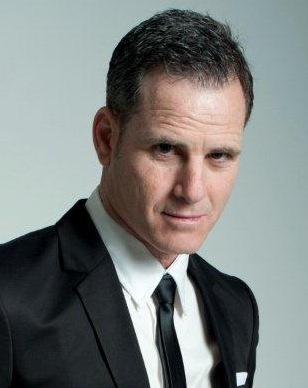

Personal information
- Full name: Ben-Zion Shabbtai Ginzburg
- Date of birth: 12 December 1964 (age 61)
- Place of birth: Tel Aviv, Israel
- Height: 1.86 m (6 ft 1 in)
- Position: Goalkeeper

Youth career
- 1980–1984: Maccabi Tel Aviv

Senior career*
Years	Team	Apps	(Gls)
1984–1987	Maccabi Tel Aviv	113	(0)
1984	→ Maccabi Petah Tikva (loan)		
1987–1988	Maccabi Haifa	31	(0)
1988–1989	Beitar Jerusalem	24	(0)
1989–1991	Rangers	4	(0)
1991–1992	Maccabi Yavne		
1992–1993	Beitar Tel Aviv	31	(0)
1993–1995	Ironi Ashdod	67	(0)
1995–1996	Bnei Yehuda	27	(0)
1996–1999	Maccabi Haifa	14	(0)
1999–2000	Hapoel Ashkelon	30	(0)
2000–2001	Hapoel Kfar Saba		

International career
1984–1996	Israel	68	(0)
- * Club domestic league appearances and goals

Ben-Zion Shabbtai "Boni" Ginzburg (or Bonni, Hebrew: בן-ציון שבתאי "בוני" גינצבורג; born 12 December 1964) is an Israeli retired footballer, who played as a goalkeeper and retired in 2001. He played for 11 different clubs during his extensive career from 1983 to 2001, and collected 68 caps for Israel.

== Early life ==
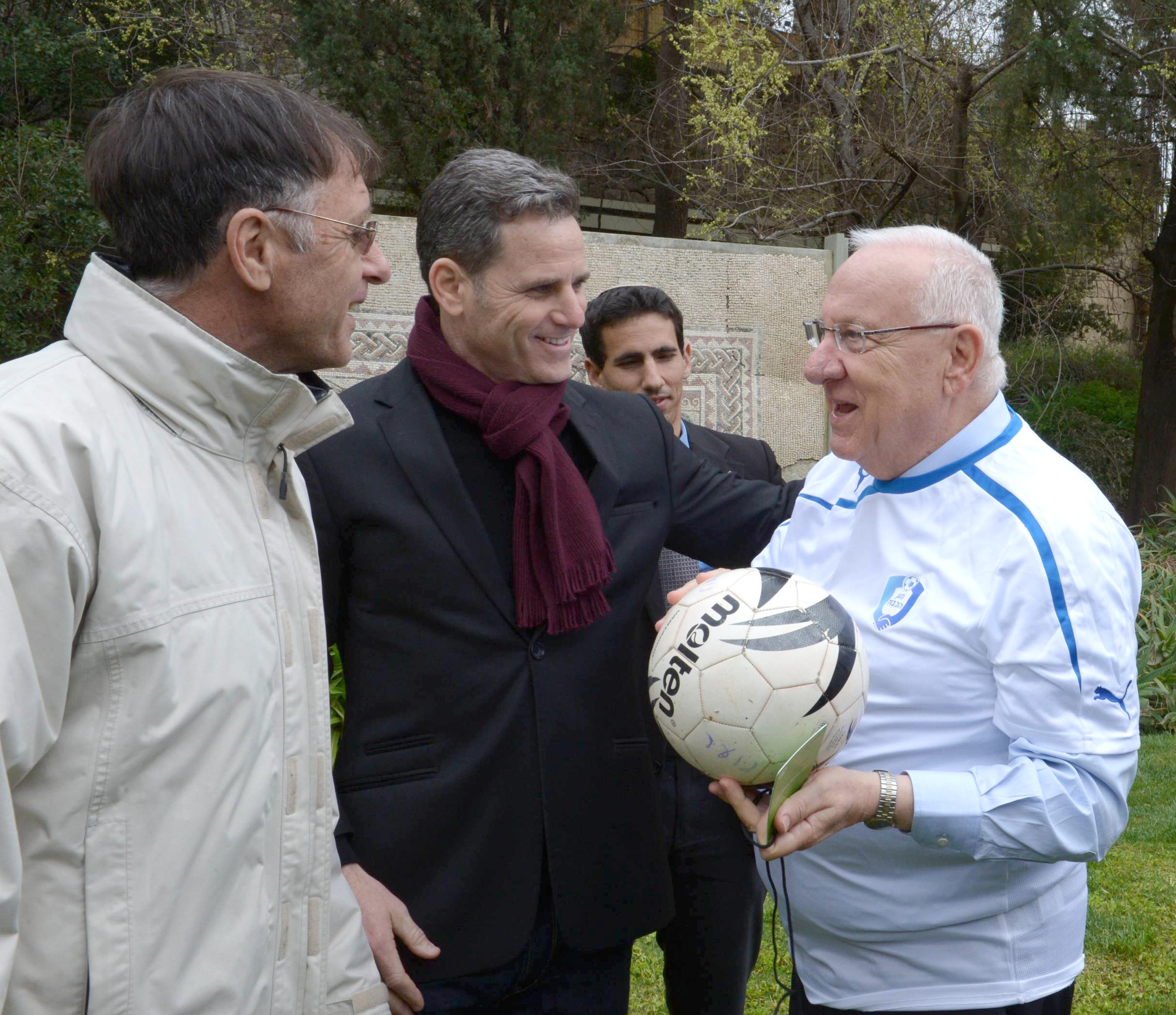
Ginzburg with the President of Israel Reuven Rivlin in 2015

Ben-Zion Shabbtai Ginzburg was born in Tel Aviv, Israel, to a family of Ashkenazi Jewish descent. His father died of a heart attack when he was eight.

== Club career ==
In 1983, at the age of 16, he joined Maccabi Tel Aviv FC as a goalkeeper. He also played for Maccabi Petah Tikva FC, Maccabi Haifa F.C. and Beitar Jerusalem FC, before signing for Rangers in 1989.

After two seasons in Glasgow playing second-fiddle to England's Chris Woods, Ginzburg returned home, representing successively Maccabi Yavne FC, Beitar Tel Aviv FC, Maccabi Ironi Ashdod FC, Bnei Yehuda Tel Aviv FC, Maccabi Haifa FC, Hapoel Ashkelon F.C. and Hapoel Kfar Saba FC, and retiring at nearly 37.

== International career ==
Ginzburg made his debut for Israel 10 June 1984 in a friendly with Wales keeping a clean sheet as the game ended 0–0. His last match was in another exhibition game, this time against Romania on 14 August 1996, a 0–2 away loss.

In addition to the 62 caps won in FIFA-recognised games, Ginzburg gained another six in qualifying games for the 1988 Olympic football tournament. In his full side appearances he kept 15 clean sheets, adding four in the Olympic ones.

== Media career ==
After retiring Ginzburg began working, eventually as the main presenter, for Channel One's Rishon beSha'ar, a football highlights programme. He also participated in Israel's version of Dancing with the Stars. Nowadays, Boni works as a commentator for the Israeli sports channel Sport 5.

== Awards and recognition ==
- Israeli Cup: 1986–87, 1988–89

== See also ==
- Sports in Israel
- Television in Israel
