= Ofer Talker =

Israeli footballer and manager

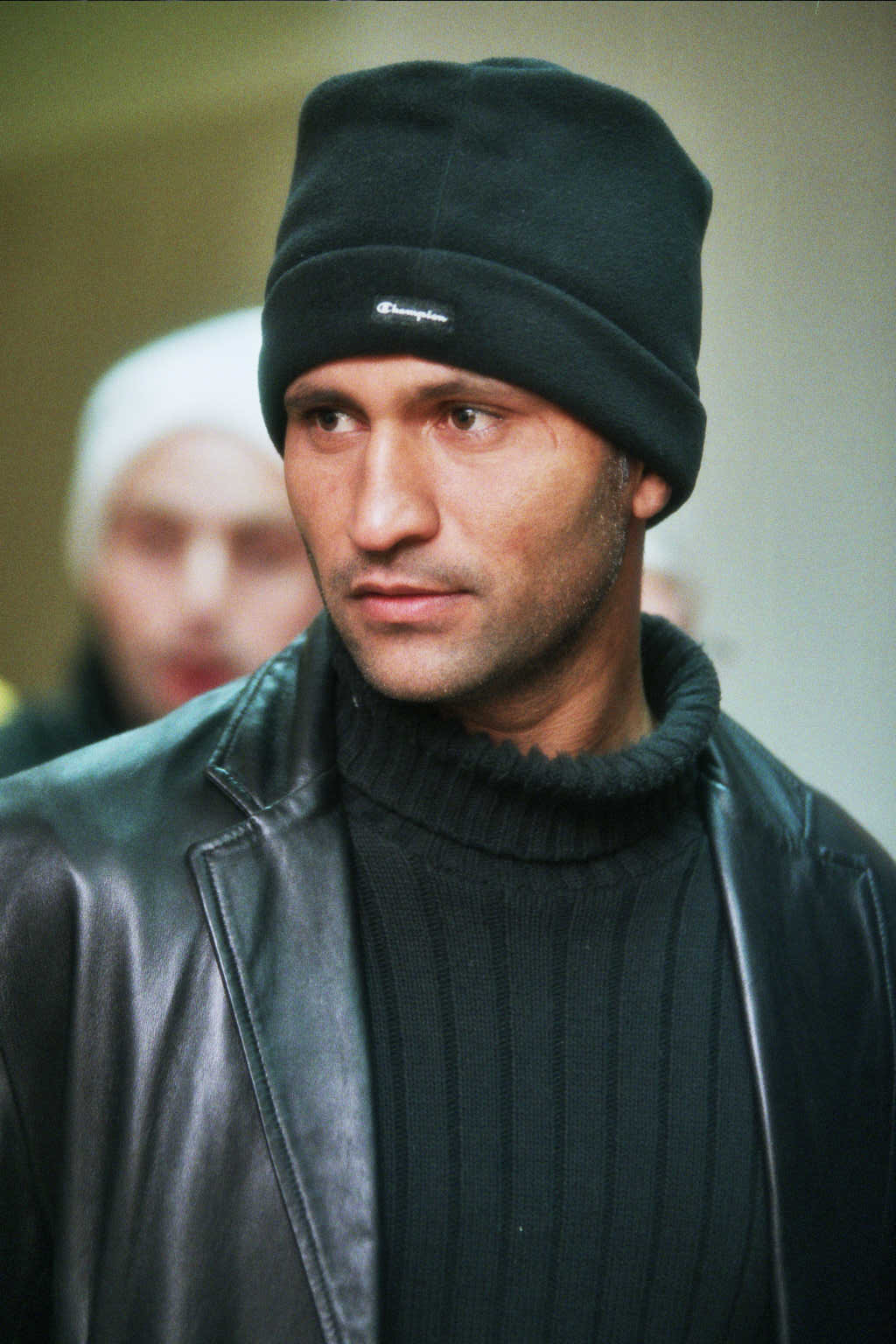

Personal information
- Full name: Ofer Talker
- Date of birth: April 22, 1973 (age 53)
- Place of birth: Ashdod, Israel
- Height: 5 ft 10 in (1.78 m)
- Position: Defender

Youth career
- Maccabi Ironi Ashdod

Senior career*
Years	Team	Apps	(Gls)
1991–1993	Maccabi Ironi Ashdod	28	(3)
1993–2002	Hapoel Haifa	195	(46)
2002–2005	Beitar Jerusalem	99	(5)
2005–2006	Maccabi Netanya	27	(1)
2006–2009	Hapoel Kfar Saba	37	(0)

International career
1997–2001	Israel	23	(1)

Managerial career
- 2009–2011: Maccabi Herzliya (U-20 & assistant)
- 2011–2012: Maccabi Herzliya
- 2013: Beitar Tel Aviv Ramla
- 2014: Sektzia Ness Ziona
- 2015: Hapoel Nazareth Illit
- 2016: Maccabi Herzliya
- 2016–2017: Hapoel Herzliya
- 2017–2018: Maccabi Herzliya
- 2018–: Maccabi Ironi Sderot
- * Club domestic league appearances and goals

Ofer Talker (Hebrew: עופר טלקר; born April 22, 1973) is a former Israeli football defender and now works as a manager.

== Early years ==
Talker was born in Ashdod, Israel, to a family of Indian-Jewish heritage.

== Club career ==
Talker began playing for the youth group of Maccabi Ironi Ashdod until 1988 when he moved to the elder team. In 1993, he moved to Hapoel Haifa, where he won the Israeli Premier League and the Toto Cup. In the middle of the 2002 season, he moved to Beitar Jerusalem, where he played for four years.

At the end of 2005 Talker moved to Maccabi Netanya and in 2006 to Hapoel Kfar Saba, where he remained until his retirement in 2009.

== Coaching career ==
On 23 May 2011, Talker was appointed as the manager of Maccabi Herzliya. He left the club in November 2012.

On 11 February 2013, Talker was appointed as the manager of Beitar Tel Aviv Ramla. He worked as the manager of Beitar until the end of that season.

In January 2014 he worked as the manager of Sektzia Nes Tziona.

On January 28, 2015, Ofer was appointed as the manager of Hapoel Nazareth Illit. He was sacked from the club on December 26, 2015, and a day later was rehired.

== Honours ==
=== As a Player ===
- Israeli Premier League (1):
  - 1998-99
- Toto Cup (1):
  - 2000-01

=== As a Manager ===
- Israeli Noar Leumit League (1):
  - 2010-11
