= Uri Karagula =

Israeli footballer

Ori Karagula אוֹרי קרגוּלה
Personal information
- Date of birth: December 18, 1978 (age 47)
- Position: Striker

Team information
- Current team: Maccabi Ironi Ashdod (manager)

Youth career
- Beitar Tel Aviv

Senior career*
Years	Team	Apps	(Gls)
1995–2000	Beitar Tel Aviv		
2000–2003	Beitar Shimshon Tel Aviv		
2001–2002	→ Maccabi Ahi Nazareth (loan)		
2002	→ Hapoel Tayibe (loan)		
2003–2004	Hapoel Tel Aviv	20	(1)
2004–2005	Beitar Shimshon Tel Aviv		
2005–2006	Hapoel Ramat HaSharon		
2006	Maccabi Ironi Bat Yam	9	(2)
2006	Hapoel Maxim Lod	1	(0)
2007–2012	Maccabi Yavne	138	(96)
2012–2013	Maccabi Amishav Petah Tikva	28	(22)
2013	Hapoel Azor	7	(1)
2013–2014	Maccabi Kabilio Jaffa	18	(14)
2014	Hapoel Kfar Shalem	13	(4)
2014–2015	Maccabi Sha'arayim	17	(8)

Managerial career
- 2015–2018: Maccabi Kabilio Jaffa
- 2018: Maccabi Yavne
- 2018: Hapoel Marmorek
- 2019–2020: Hapoel Bik'at HaYarden
- 2022: Hapoel Qalansawe
- 2022–2023: Hapoel Lod
- 2023–: Maccabi Ironi Ashdod
- * Club domestic league appearances and goals

Ori Karagula (Hebrew: אוֹרי קרגוּלה; born December 18, 1978) is an Israeli footballer who played as a striker.

== Honours ==
- Liga Alef (South):
  - Winner (1): 2011-12
- Liga Alef (South) - 2007-08 Top Goalscorer (24 goals)
- Liga Alef (South) - 2008-09 Top Goalscorer (25 goals)
- Liga Alef (South) - 2010-11 Top Goalscorer (22 goals)
