= Dolev Azulay =

Israeli footballer

Dolev Azulay דולב אזולאי
Personal information
- Full name: Dolev Azulay
- Date of birth: October 9, 1997 (age 29)
- Place of birth: Tzippori, Israel
- Position: Center back

Team information
- Current team: Maccabi Petah Tikva
- Number: 20

Youth career
- 2008–2016: Hapoel Nazareth Illit

Senior career*
Years	Team	Apps	(Gls)
2016–2018	Hapoel Nazareth Illit	63	(1)
2018–2021	Maccabi Netanya	54	(1)
2021–2022	Hapoel Nof HaGalil	25	(0)
2022–2023	Maccabi Petah Tikva	22	(1)
2023–	Hapoel Nof HaGalil	98	(11)
- * Club domestic league appearances and goals as of 24 June 2026

Dolev Azulay (Hebrew: דולב אזולאי) is an Israeli footballer who plays Hapoel Nof HaGalil.

== Career ==
Azulay started his career in Hapoel Nazareth Illit's youth teams. On 2 November 2015, he made his debut on the 1–1 draw against Hapoel Afula. On 12 January 2018, scored his debut goal in the 4–2 win against Hapoel Hadera.

On 23 July 2018, signed in the Israeli Premier League club Maccabi Netanya.

On 16 June 2021, Azulay returned to Hapoel Nof HaGalil.

== Career statistics ==
As of 1 June 2024.

Club	Season	League			State Cup		Toto Cup		Continental		Other		Total	
Club	Season	Division	Apps	Goals	Apps	Goals	Apps	Goals	Apps	Goals	Apps	Goals	Apps	Goals
Hapoel Nazareth Illit	2014–15	Liga Leumit	0	0	0	0	1	0	0	0	0	0	1	0
Hapoel Nazareth Illit	2015–16	Liga Leumit	12	0	1	0	1	0	0	0	0	0	14	0
Hapoel Nazareth Illit	2016–17	Liga Leumit	18	0	1	0	1	0	0	0	1	0	21	0
Hapoel Nazareth Illit	2017–18	Liga Leumit	33	1	1	0	3	0	0	0	0	0	37	1
Hapoel Nazareth Illit	Total		63	1	3	0	6	0	0	0	1	0	73	1
Maccabi Netanya	2018–19	Israeli Premier League	13	0	2	0	4	0	0	0	0	0	19	0
Maccabi Netanya	2019–20	Israeli Premier League	28	0	2	1	2	0	0	0	0	0	32	1
Maccabi Netanya	2020–21	Israeli Premier League	13	1	1	0	4	0	0	0	0	0	18	1
Maccabi Netanya	Total		54	1	5	1	10	0	0	0	0	0	69	2
Hapoel Nof HaGalil	2021–22	Israeli Premier League	25	0	1	0	5	1	0	0	0	0	31	1
Hapoel Nof HaGalil	Total		25	0	1	0	5	1	0	0	0	0	31	1
Maccabi Petah Tikva	2022–23	Israeli Premier League	22	1	4	0	3	0	0	0	0	0	29	1
Maccabi Petah Tikva	Total		22	1	4	0	3	0	0	0	0	0	29	1
Hapoel Nof HaGalil	2023–24	Liga Leumit	29	2	4	0	4	1	0	0	0	0	37	2
Hapoel Nof HaGalil	2024–25	Liga Leumit	0	0	0	0	0	0	0	0	0	0	0	0
Hapoel Nof HaGalil	Total		29	2	4	0	4	1	0	0	0	0	37	1
Career total			193	5	17	1	28	2	0	0	1	0	239	6
