= George Amsis =

Israeli footballer

George Amsis جورج أمسيس
Personal information
- Full name: George Amsis
- Date of birth: 17 December 1990 (age 35)
- Place of birth: Jaffa, Tel Aviv, Israel
- Position: Striker

Team information
- Current team: Bnei Jaffa Ortodoxim

Youth career
- 2002–2009: Gadna Tel Aviv Yehuda

Senior career*
Years	Team	Apps	(Gls)
2009–2011	Bnei Yehuda	23	(4)
2011–2012	Maccabi Herzliya	20	(2)
2012–2016	Hapoel Bnei Lod	84	(5)
2016–2017	Hapoel Nazareth Illit	39	(14)
2017–2018	Hapoel Rishon LeZion	25	(3)
2018–2019	Hapoel Marmorek	13	(0)
2019	Hapoel Rishon LeZion	13	(1)
2019–2020	Shimshon Kafr Qasim	15	(4)
2020–2021	Nordia Jerusalem	4	(0)
2020–2022	Hapoel Baqa al-Gharbiyye	42	(9)
2022–2023	Hapoel Bnei Lod	10	(2)
2023–	Bnei Jaffa Ortodoxim	7	(1)

International career
2011	Israel U-21	1	(0)
- * Club domestic league appearances and goals as of 24 February 2024

George Amsis (Arabic: جورج أمسيس, Hebrew: ג'ורג' אמסיס) is an Israeli-Arab footballer, currently playing for Bnei Jaffa Ortodoxim.

== Career ==
Amsis grew in Gadna Tel Aviv, and moved to Bnei Yehuda upon reaching senior age, in 2009. After two years with Bnei Yehuda, Amsis moved to play for Liga Leumit club Maccabi Herzliya, for which he played one season, moving to Hapoel Bnei Lod at the beginning of the next season.

Amsis stayed with Bnei Lod for three seasons, winning the Toto Cup Leumit in 2015 with the club. In January 2016, Amsis transferred to Hapoel Nazareth Illit.

== Honours ==
- Toto Cup Leumit (1):
  - 2014–15
