= Ashdod derby =

1962 Israeli football match

The Ashdod derby
- Location: Israel
- Teams: Hapoel Ashdod; Maccabi Ironi Ashdod
- First meeting: 13 January 1962

Statistics
- Most wins: Hapoel Ashdod (13)

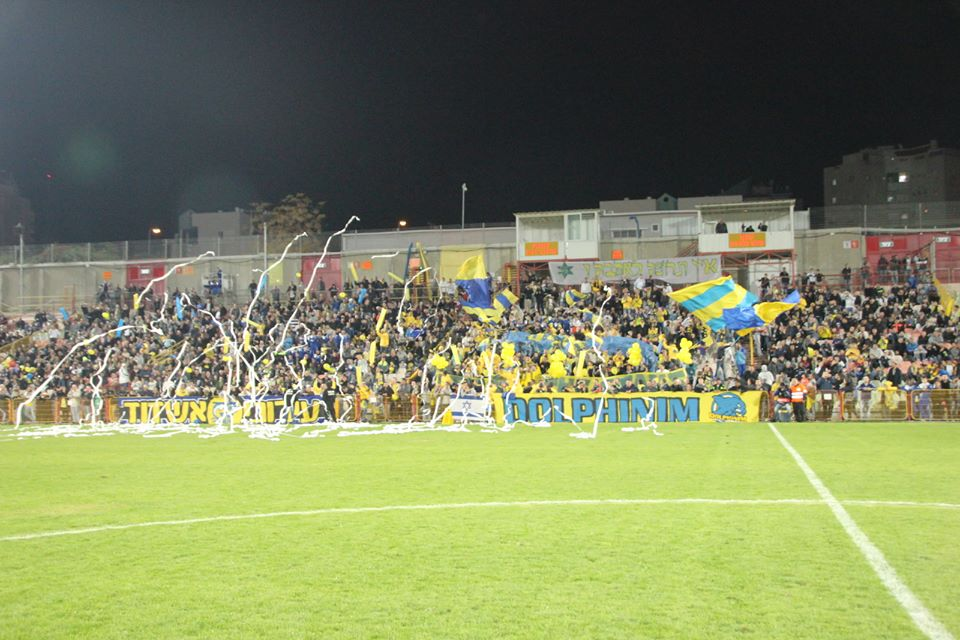
Maccabi Ironi fans in action

The Ashdod derby (Hebrew: הדרבי של אשדוד) is the football match between Hapoel Ashdod and Maccabi Ironi Ashdod both from Ashdod, Israel. The first derby was played on 13 January 1962.

== Statistics ==
As of 5 November 2024

Competition	Hapoel Ashdod wins	Draws	Maccabi Ironi Ashdod wins	Hapoel Ashdod goals	Maccabi Ironi Ashdod goals
League	13	11	10	54	38
Cup	0	2	1	2	4
Total	13	13	11	56	42
