= Avi Edri =

Avi Edri (Hebrew: אבי אדרי; born 13 October 1968) is the chairman of the transport workers union in Israel. The Transport Union is affiliated to the Histadrut, the General Federation of Labour in Israel.

== Public Sector Career ==
After 3 years of work as an airport customs officer, Edri was elected as a member of the Airport Customs Workers council. Later he became chairman of the committee. In 2003, Edri was elected as the Chairman of National Committee of customs and V.A.T workers in Israel.

In 2008, the union under his leadership won many achievements for the transport workers, in terms of wages, and security in employment, including transferring workers from personal employment contracts to collective agreements. The union signed an agreement to cooperate with the Palestinian transport workers union. He founded a forum of leaders from the truck drivers committee to improve the employment conditions of truck drivers in Israel.

Edri also represents the country's port unions.

In 2016 Edri prevented a national Egged (company) bus driver strike by negotiating a minimum NIS 39-per-hour ($9.9) pay rate for the bus drivers.

Edri in 2018 at the International Transport Workers' Federation congress called for global solidarity among all workers to safeguard lives and to prevent boycotts for political reasons that only hurt the workers.

== COVID19 ==
Against the backdrop of the COVID-19 crisis and its impact on the aviation and tourism industries, Avi Edri spearheaded the Transport Union response and negotiations with the airline carriers to mitigate the negative impact on the workers of the industry. The achievements of the union include collective agreements that regulate the salary and employment conditions of the pilots. prevention of dismissal of employees. Edri, was a key negotiator to secure Israel's national Airline El Al's fate facilitating government aid, job and spending cuts.
