= Jacky Ben-Zaken =

Israeli businessman

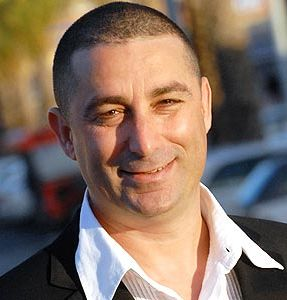
Jacky Ben-Zaken

Jacky Ben-Zaken (Hebrew: ג'קי בן זקן; Mazkeret Batya) is an Israeli businessman from Ashdod. His main business focus is in real estate, he owns dozens of companies in real estate, high-tech, communications . He is also known as owner of the Israeli Premier League football club F.C. Ashdod.

== Early life ==
Ben-Zaken was born in Mazkeret Batya. He moved to Ashdod after his mother second marriage. The family was not wealthy and he worked in random coming works (like flowers sale) during his school years. After his military service in IDF he started to work in insurance agency belonging to Efraim Gur - one of the leaders of Georgian community in Israel.

== Politics ==
When Efraim Gur was elected to Knesset Ben-Zaken became his parliamentary adviser. In 1993 Ben-Zaken was elected to Ashdod municipality as leader of "Tzeirey Ashdod" faction.

== Real estate ==
In 1997, in partnership with Avraam Nanikashvili and old friend, retired footballer Haim Revivo he initiated Filgar LTD company. Using explosive population growth of Ashdod the company upgraded their business facilities and the group started to invest in yielding real estate across the Israel. In 2005 they bought financial group "Financial Levers LTD". Using successful capital raising in Tel Aviv Stock Exchange "Financial Levers LTD" started in series of acquisitions in Israel and abroad mainly in Texas, Russia and Kazakhstan.

== F. C. Ashdod ==
Ben-Zaken is the owner 0f F.C. Ashdod. Under their rule the club stabilized and keep a position in the upper part of the Israeli Premier League. The Ashdod football school is one of the best in the country and the club based on its own players.
