= Maccabi Ironi Ashdod F.C. =

Israeli football club

Maccabi Ironi Ashdod מכבי עירוני אשדוד
- Full name: Maccabi Ironi Ashdod
- Nicknames: The Dolphins, "Ironia"
- Short name: Ironi
- Founded: 1961 as Maccabi Ashdod; 1981 as Maccabi Ironi Ashdod; 2015 (Re-established) as Football club Maccabi Ashdod
- Dissolved: 1999 (Original club, merged with Hapoel Ashdod).
- Ground: synthetic Stadium, Ashdod
- Capacity: 2,000
- Owners: Fan-owned
- Chairman: Baruch Dego
- Manager: Raz Meshulam
- League: Liga Alef South
- 2024–25: Liga Alef South, 8th of 16
Home colours	Away colours

Maccabi Ironi Ashdod F.C. (Hebrew: מכבי עירוני אשדוד), commonly known as Ironi Ashdod, is an Israeli football club based in Ashdod city. In 1999, the club was forced to merge with local rivals Hapoel Ashdod to create F.C. Ashdod (Moadon Sport Ashdod).

In 2015, the club was resurrected by its supporters. The newborn club, owned and operated by fans, began in the bottom tier of Israeli football – Liga Gimel. Ironi Ashdod did well in their inaugural season and were promoted to Liga Bet.

== Re-establishment as a fan-owned club ==
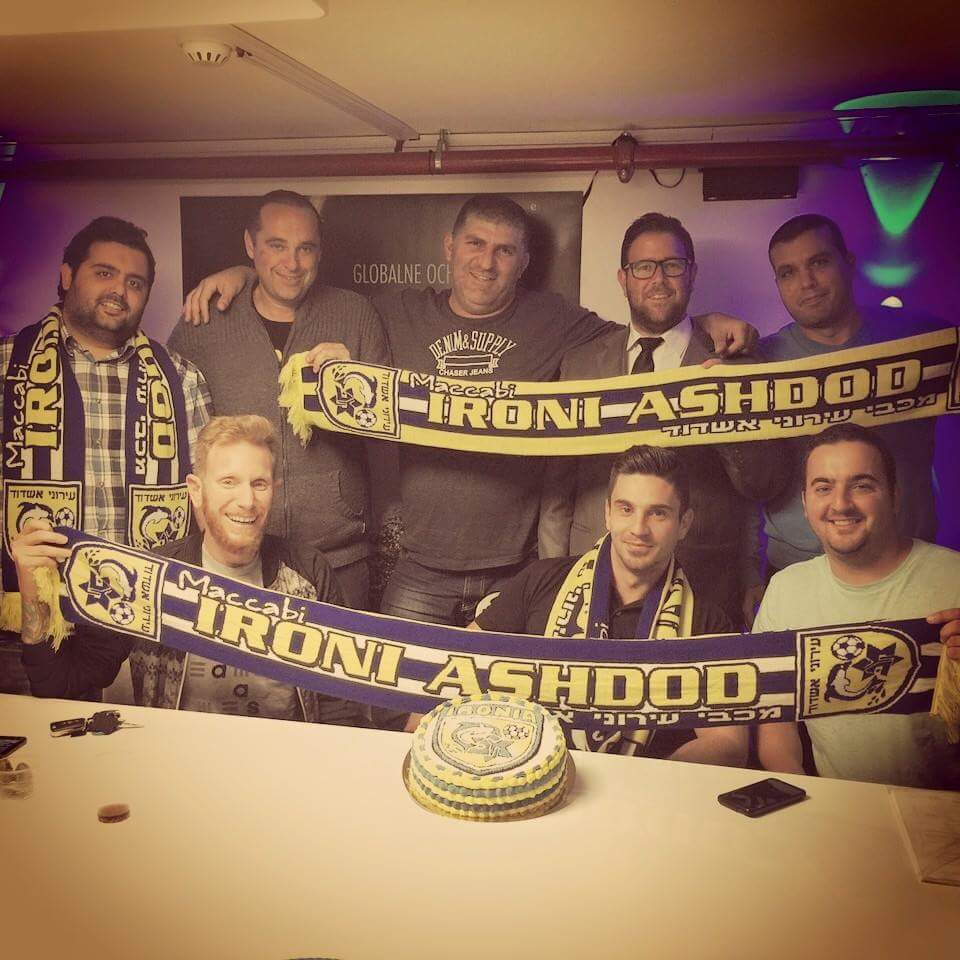
Founders of the new club, on the day the construction was signed. 14 in April 2015

During the 2014–15 season, Ironi Ashdod fans protested against F.C. Ashdod chairman Jacky Ben-Zaken by cheering for the opponents of F.C. Ashdod during matches. The protests intensified after Ben-Zaken decided to rename F.C. Ashdod to Hapoel Ashdod and change the team colors to red.

After re-organizing as a fan-owned club, the club played the 2015–16 season in Liga Gimel. Pini Ayash was appointed as head coach and Tal Aspormas was signed as general manager.

At the start of the 2016–17 season, the "Ironi Ashdod Fans association" had 193 members that could vote or be nominated during elections.

== Early history ==
The old logo (1981–1999)

Maccabi Ashdod FC was established in 1961 by the Israeli Maccabi Union, and was registered for the start of the games in Liga Gimel Central division. Some of the more famous players during the first years in "Liga Gimel" were Yehoshua Peretz, Zvika Kaspi, Shlomo Lasri and Meir Ben-Harush.

At the end of 1979–1980, the club qualified for the first time to "Liga Bet". At the end of 1980–1981, a major change was made as Maccabi Ashdod FC merged with Beitar Ashdod FC. The club added "Ironi" to its name (the first team in Israel to use that name) and was from then known as Maccabi Ironi Ashdod.

In July 1983, the club was sent by the Maccabi Israel Association to participate in the Maccabiah Games in Antwerp. They won the gold medal, beating Maccabi England 0–1 in the finals on Joseph Marzouk's goal. After two seasons in Liga Alef, the club was dropped back to "Liga Bet" (1983/1984).

At the end of 1988/1989 season, Maccabi Ironi Ashdod advanced back to Liga Alef after tough competition with Sektzia Ness Ziona. In 1989/1990, under the guidance of coach Arie Radler, Maccabi Ironi Ashdod led the Liga Alef South division until the 19' round, then a lost 1–0 to Hapoel Ashdod. In the final round, Maccabi Ironi Ashdod played Hapoel Kiryat Ono for second place, leading to national league Artzit play-off matches. Ironi Ashdod won 2–3 with a winning goal scored by Micah Sharvit in the 94th minute. In the playoffs, they won 1–2 over Hapoel Daliyat al-Karmel and 0–1 over Maccabi Tamra, resulting in two league promotions in two straight seasons.

In the National Artzit league, Ironi Ashdod played for three straight seasons. In their first season, Ironi finished fourth after leading the table a number of times. A year later the club signed Ofer Shitrit, Pudi Halfon, Miro Ben-Shimon and Fabian Grimberg. After a few rounds, Arie Radler was replaced by Reuven Cohen as head coach and the club finished the season in the middle of the table.

At the end of the 1992–1993 season, the club was promoted for the first time in its history to the first Israeli league Leumit. Young striker Amir Turgeman returned after a loan at Maccabi Tel Aviv, combining with Haim Levy, Meir Azran and a few other key players.

Ironi Ashdod signed many great players, such as Motti Ivanir, Igor Petrov and goalkeeper Bonni Ginzburg during 1993/1994 season and managed to secure another season in the league a few rounds before the end of the season. The following season, they climbed to first place after five rounds (2–3 victory over Maccabi Haifa at Kiryat Eliezer Stadium), but were eventually dropped back to the second League after a 1–1 draw against Maccabi Petah Tikva in the last round (1-1).

The club strengthened during the 1995/1996 season, but failed to return to the first league. One year later, Ironi Ashdod signed Aleksandr Polukarov, Naor Galili and Sami Ayash and returned to the first division after a close race with Maccabi Netanya and a crucial win over Hapoel Kiryat Shmona in the final round.

The 1997/1998 season was special. Stronger play from key contributors Alon Hazan, Yossi Madar, Tibor Balogh, and later Kazimierz Moskal allowed the team to reach the Israeli Cup Semi Finals for the first time in its history., which they ultimately lost 5–0 to Maccabi Haifa. The 1998/1999 team got the nickname "Robin Hood" from the media after defeating strong teams at Yud-Alef Stadium while losing to smaller clubs while playing at home.

On July 26, 1999, following heavy pressure from Jackie Ben Zaken, the club was forced to merge with their rival, Hapoel Ashdod, for financial reasons. The new club was called Ashdod F.C (Moadon Sport Ashdod) and their symbol and club color was changed.

== Recent history ==
- 2015/2016 Season

Maccabi Ironi Ashdod began the 2015/2016 season by signing local players Roy Sabbag, Yitzhak Ybarkan, Arieal Trabelsi, Daniel Tolmasov and Moshe Shalev and hiring experienced coach Pini Ayash. The team finished in first place, winning the promotion to Liga Bet "Darom Bet," the fourth league in the Israeli football, after a close battle with Maccabi Sderot. In the process, the team won three derby games from four league games against Hapoel Bnei Ashdod and Hapoel Adumim Ashdod. In the Israeli State cup, the team won the Liga Gimel Darom division trophy. Trabelsi scored two goals, and Tolomosov and Atias had one each to give a 4–1 victory over their rivals Adumim Ashdod. One round (4) later, the club lost to Hakoah Amidar Ramat Gan F.C. from Liga Alef by a score of 1–0.

- 2016/2017 Season

The debut in Liga Bet "Darom Bet" wasn't perfect and a harsh pre-season didn't help new coach Tal Hirshoren succeed. After seven games and a crucial loss to Agudat Sport Nordia Jerusalem 1–0 at the Yud-alef stadium, he was sacked. Sharon Martziano was hired to stabilize the situation and to change the way the team played. The talented Eran Malkin, Dor Nahmani and Daniel Rahimi were signed and together, with a few additional changes, the team was able to make a twenty-game run without losing, eventually finishing fourth in the league.

The playoffs started well for the Dolphins after a 1–0 win against Beitar Giv'at Ze'ev at Givat Ze'ev, and continued with a dramatic 2–1 away win on penalty kicks against Kiryat Malachi, 2–2 after 90 minutes. Ironi played the semi-finals "Gmar Hamehozot" against F.C. Ironi Or Yehuda from Liga Bet "Darom Alef". After 90 minutes the score was 2-2. At the 115 minute mark, Or-Yehuda managed to take the lead and eventually win by a score of 3–2 after 120 minutes.

- 2017/2018 Season
- 2018/2019 Season

The team finished in first place, winning the promotion to Liga Alef Darom, After a 1–0 win against Bnei Eilat in the Round of the season finale.

== Current squad ==
As to 8 January 2025

No.	Pos.	Nation	Player
1	GK	ISR	Noam Rudik
2	DF	ISR	Ilay Ivgi
3	DF	ISR	Eitan Komisarov
4	DF	ISR	Eitan Aviran
5	DF	ISR	David Mantayeev
6	DF	ISR	Ido Schwarz
7	MF	ISR	Nirel Mahpud
8	FW	ISR	Liad Cohen
9	FW	ISR	Ahmed Masry
10	MF	ISR	Bentzi Moshel
11	MF	ISR	Adi Giat
13	MF	ISR	Daniel Gretz

No.	Pos.	Nation	Player
14	DF	ISR	Daniel Shwarzboim
15	MF	ISR	Ben Reboah
18	DF	ISR	Shalev Saban
19	DF	ISR	Shay Moshel
21	DF	ISR	Amos Machluf
22	FW	ISR	Yoel Negrin
23	MF	ISR	David Daburkin
26	DF	ISR	Ilay Cohen
27	FW	ISR	Roy Turgeman
31	GK	ISR	Ziv Sa'adon
36	GK	ISR	Re'em Golan
77	MF	ISR	Ofek Lilus

== Honours ==
=== League ===
Honour	No.	Years
Fourth tier	4	1966–68^{1}, 1981–82, 1988–89, 2018–19
Fifth tier	2	1979–80^{1}, 2015–16
Sixth tier	1	1976–77^{1}

^{1.} as Maccabi Ashdod

=== Israel Cup State ===
Honour

Semi Finals 1997/1998

Liga Bet south Division Cup 1988/1989, 2017/2018
Liga Gimel south Division Cup 2015/2016

== Notable former managers ==
- Nir Levine (born 1962)

== Costume maker ==
Years	manufacturer
1975–1981	Adidas
1981–1987	Umbro
1987–1990	Puma
1990–1999	Diadora
2015–2016	Lotto
2016–2017	Umbro
2017–2018	Diadora
2018–	Lotto

== See also ==
- Ashdod football derby
- Category:Maccabi Ironi Ashdod F.C. players
- Maccabi Ashdod B.C
- Maccabi Bnot Ashdod
- List of Fan-Owned Sports teams
