= Teres Shulkowsky =

Israeli footballer

Teres Shulkowsky טרס שולקובסקי
Personal information
- Full name: Teres Shulkowsky
- Date of birth: December 28, 1989 (age 36)
- Place of birth: Hadera, Israel
- Position: Left back

Team information
- Current team: Hapoel Marmorek
- Number: 4

Youth career
- Maccabi Netanya

Senior career*
Years	Team	Apps	(Gls)
2009–2010	Maccabi Netanya	1	(0)
2010	→ Maccabi Ironi Jatt (loan)	7	(1)
2010	Hapoel Hadera	2	(0)
2010–2011	Hapoel Kfar Shalem	14	(0)
2011–2012	Hapoel Nazareth Illit	25	(1)
2012–2013	Hapoel Afula	21	(0)
2013–2014	Hapoel Migdal HaEmek	31	(1)
2014–2015	Ironi Nesher	27	(3)
2015–2016	Maccabi Ironi Kiryat Ata	19	(1)
2016–2017	Hapoel Iksal	28	(3)
2017–2018	Hapoel Baqa al-Gharbiyye	28	(2)
2018–2019	Hapoel Herzliya	30	(3)
2019	Hapoel Bnei Zalafa	11	(0)
2019–2021	Maccabi Yavne	29	(1)
2021	Maccabi Ironi Kiryat Ata	1	(0)
2021	Hapoel Migdal HaEmek	4	(0)
2021–2022	Hapoel Bnei Fureidis	19	(0)
2022	Ahva Reineh	4	(0)
2022–2024	Ironi Nesher	50	(5)
2024	Hapoel Lod	7	(2)
2024–	Hapoel Marmorek	1	(0)
- * Club domestic league appearances and goals as of 2 July 2024

Teres Shulkowsky (Hebrew: טרס שולקובסקי; born December 28, 1989, in Netanya, Israel) is an Israeli footballer who plays as a defenderfor Hapoel Marmorek. He has also played for Maccabi Netanya, Maccabi Ironi Jatt, Hapoel Hadera and Hapoel Kfar Shalem.

Shulkowsky started his career in the youth team of Maccabi Netanya. In 2009, he made his debut for the senior team in the Israeli Premier League.
