= Liad Elmaliach =

Israeli footballer

Personal information
- Full name: Liad Elmaliach
- Date of birth: 21 February 1989 (age 37)
- Place of birth: Karmiel, Israel
- Height: 1.79 m (5 ft 10 1/2 in)
- Positions: Defensive midfielder; centre back

Youth career
- Maccabi Haifa

Senior career*
Years	Team	Apps	(Gls)
2009–2011	Maccabi Haifa	0	(0)
2010–2011	→ Hapoel Acre (loan)	51	(3)
2011–2012	Podbeskidzie Bielsko-Biała	5	(0)
2012–2021	Hapoel Nof HaGalil	248	(10)
2014	→ Hapoel Ashkelon (loan)	4	(1)
2021–2022	Hapoel Ra'anana	17	(0)
2022–2024	Hapoel Karmiel	63	(9)
- * Club domestic league appearances and goals

Liad Elmaliach (Hebrew: ליעד אלמליח; born 21 February 1989) is an Israeli former footballer.

== Career ==
Elmaliach is a homegrown player of Maccabi Haifa, where captained the young team. In 2009, he was promoted to the senior team.

He was loaned to Hapoel Acre for the 2009–10 season. He made his debut against his home team, Maccabi Haifa and even scored a goal, but couldn't prevent a 1–2 defeat. He continued playing for Hapoel in the following campaign, amassing a total of 51 appearances and three goals for the club.

On 3 January 2011, Elmaliach signed a contract with the Polish club Podbeskidzie Bielsko-Biała; he left the club on 4 July 2012.
