= Yarden Cohen (footballer, born 1991) =

Israeli footballer

Personal information
- Full name: Yarden Cohen
- Date of birth: 18 September 1991 (age 35)
- Place of birth: Kfar Vradim, Israel
- Position: Striker

Team information
- Current team: F.C. Tirat HaKarmel

Youth career
- Hapoel Nazareth Illit

Senior career*
Years	Team	Apps	(Gls)
2010–2011	Hapoel Nazareth Illit	31	(9)
2011–2013	Maccabi Netanya	12	(0)
2012	→ Hapoel Nazareth Illit	17	(2)
2013–2017	Hapoel Nazareth Illit	158	(21)
2015	→ Ironi Tiberias	11	(0)
2017–2018	Hapoel Rishon LeZion	12	(0)
2018	Hapoel Acre	3	(0)
2018–2021	F.C. Kafr Qasim	70	(16)
2021	Maccabi Ahi Nazareth	16	(0)
2021–2023	Hapoel Petah Tikva	36	(7)
2023	Hapoel Afula	13	(1)
2023–2024	F.C. Kiryat Yam	28	(4)
2024–2025	Tzeiri Tamra	22	(9)
2025–	Tirat HaKarmel	20	(13)
- * Club domestic league appearances and goals as of 15 June 2025

Yarden Cohen (Hebrew: ירדן כהן) is an Israeli footballer who plays in the Liga Leumit for F.C. Kiryat Yam.

== Early life ==
Cohenwas born in Kfar Vradim, Israel, to a Jewish family.

== Career ==
Cohen is a protege of Hapoel Nazareth Illit youth ranks and in 2010 he became a permanent player in the senior team.

On June 16, 2011, after rejecting a move to Maccabi Haifa he signed a 5-years contract with Maccabi Netanya from the Israeli Premier League. After two years in which he didn't make an impact in Netanya, Cohen returned to play for Nazareth Illit.

On 27 July 2021, Cohen signed for Hapoel Petah Tikva.
