= Reuven Gal =

- ראובן גל
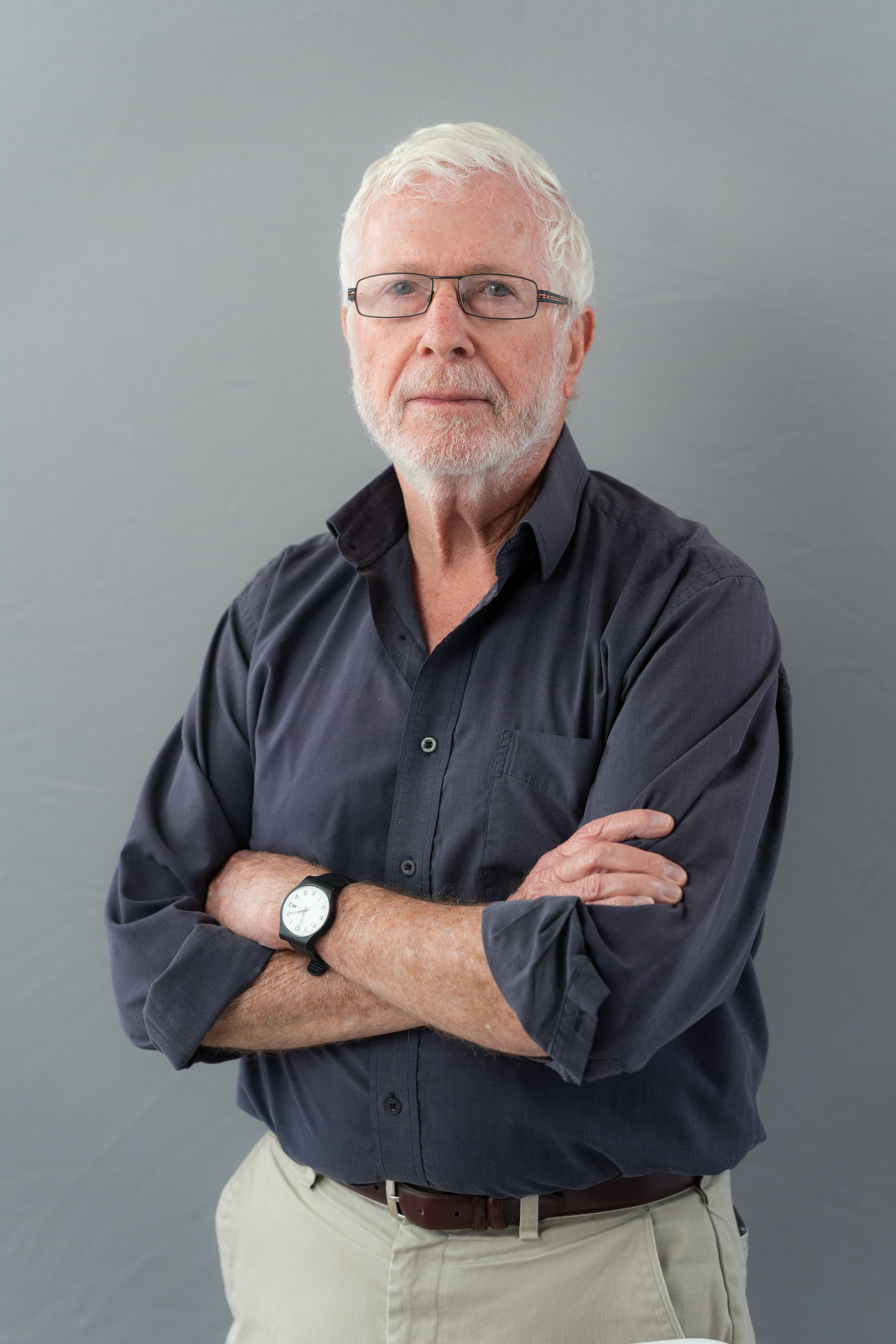

Senior Research Fellow Samuel Neaman Institute for National Policy Research
- In office 2010–Current

General Director Administration of National and Civic Service Office of the Prime Minister
- In office 2007–2009

Deputy National Security Advisor for Domestic Policy Israeli National Security Council
- In office 2002–2004

Chief Psychologist Commanding Officer of the Unit of Military Psychology Israeli Defense Forces
- In office 1977–1982

Chief Psychologist Israeli Navy
- In office 1969–1972

Personal details
- Born: August 24, 1942 (age 84) Haifa, Mandatory Palestine
- Spouse: Ivria Gal
- Relations: David Gruber (father); Ester Freiberg (mother)
- Children: Yoav Gal; Tali Gal (Gutman); Yonatan Gal
- Education: Hebrew University, Jerusalem, Israel; B.A. in Psychology & Sociology (1965); Completion of studies toward M.A. in Clinical Psychology (1967) University of California, Berkeley, CA. M.A. in General Psychology & Personality (1974); Ph.D. in Psychology (1975) Mentor: Prof. Richard Lazarus
- Profession: author, social and clinical psychologist, social activist, researcher, consultant

Military service
- Branch/service: Israeli Defense Forces (Active and Reserve service)
- Years of service: 1960-1983
- Rank: Colonel (Hebrew: Aluf Mishne)
- Battles/wars: Six-Day War; Battles in Jerusalem (1967); War of Attrition (1967-1970); Lebanon War (1982)

Reuven Gal (Hebrew: ראובן גל; born August 24, 1942, surname Gruber) is an Israeli social and clinical psychologist, a social activist and entrepreneur, researcher, author and consultant in the field of behavioural, organizational and social sciences.

Gal currently holds an academic position as a Senior Research Fellow at the Samuel Neaman Institute for National Policy Research at the Technion – Israel Institute of Technology, where he is leading and conducting several research projects related to Israeli society.

In 2007, Gal established, within the Office of the Prime Minister of Israel, the Administration for National Civic Service (ANCS ). He served as its first General Director from January 2008 to August 2009, coordinating more than 12,000 youth volunteers coming from all ethnic and religious groups.

Gal also served on the Israeli National Security Council as Deputy National Security Advisor for Domestic Policy (2002–2004), as Chief Psychologist (Commanding Officer of the Unit of Military Psychology) for the Israel Defense Forces (IDF) (1976–1982), and as Chief Psychologist for the Israeli Navy (1969–1972).

Gal is a sixth-generation descendant of Israel-born ancestors on his father's side. The founding father of this chain of ancestors was Rabbi Yisroel ben Shmuel Ashkenazi of Shklov. Gal's father, David Gruber, was born in Jerusalem, Mandatory Palestine. His mother, Ester (Freiberg), was born in Będzin, Poland and immigrated to Palestine in 1936. The rest of her family members were murdered by German Nazis.

Gal is the author or editor of six books: A Portrait of the Israeli Soldier (1986), Legitimacy and Commitment in the Military (1990), The Seventh War (1990), Handbook of Military Psychology (1991), Service Without Guns (2006), and The Yarmulke and the Beret: Religion, Politics and Military (2012).

== Education ==
Graduated from The Reali School, Haifa, Israel (matriculation), 1960.

B.A. in Psychology and Sociology, Hebrew University of Jerusalem, 1965.

Completed coursework toward an M.A. in Clinical Psychology, Hebrew University of Jerusalem, 1967.

M.A. in General Psychology and Personality, University of California, Berkeley, June 1974.

Ph.D. in Psychology, University of California, Berkeley, December 1975.

Dissertation: The Effects of Various Coping Activities on Reactions during a Stressful Anticipatory Period.

Advisor: Richard S. Lazarus.

== Battlefield and military experience; Military psychologist ==
Gal served (as part of his regular mandatory service) in the Israel Defense Forces (IDF) as a combat infantry officer from 1960 to 1963, assuming command positions from Platoon Leader to Company Commander. As a reserve officer he served as a platoon commander in an elite infantry unit, which participated in the battles in Jerusalem during the Six-Day War in 1967. Following that war, he was awarded the rank of captain in the Reserve Corps. Gal also served, in various positions as an officer in the War of Attrition (1967–1970) and in the Lebanon War (1982).

After completing his academic studies in psychology, Gal re-entered military service, this time on a career path, and served first as Chief Psychologist for the Israeli Navy (1969–1972) and thenas Chief Psychologist (Commanding Officer of the Unit of Military Psychology) for the Israel Defense Forces (IDF) from 1976 until 1982. He retired from the IDF with the rank of colonel in 1983.

Gal's combined experience – both as a combatant who saw war and as a military psychologist who treated battle casualties and consulted field commanders – helped him to develop programs to enhance and maintain units’ morale and cohesion as means for both combat preparedness as well as to protect soldiers serving in battle from emotional and psychological traumas. Gal studied the subject and wrote numerous scholarly papers on it.

After retiring from his post as chief psychologist for the IDF, Gal was awarded a Senior Research Associateship by the National Academy of Sciences (NAS) and spent two years (1983–85) in Washington D.C. doing research and academic work at the Walter Reed Army Institute of Research.

Gal's expertise in military psychology – of Western militaries in general and of the Israeli army in particular – is also reflected in his books. In 1991, Dr. Gal edited (with co-editor A. David Mangelsdorff ) the textbook Handbook of Military Psychology, published by Wiley & Sons. Bringing together a distinguished team of authors, this comprehensive book on the psychological aspects of military organizations and service was dubbed by military author Sir John Keegan as “an essential tool for military psychologists, trainers and leaders”.

In recognition of his multiple contributions in this field, Gal was awarded the Morris Janowitz Career Achievement Award from the Inter-University Seminar on Armed Forces and Society (2013) and an Honorary Award from the Association of Civil-Military Studies in Israel (2018).

== Carmel Institute for Social Studies ==
Reuven Gal at the 2008 IANYS conference in Paris

In 1985, Gal founded and subsequently headed the Israeli Institute for Military Studies. In 1993, it was renamed the Carmel Institute for Social Studies.

As a non-profit research and policy-making center, the Carmel Institute, situated in the town of Zikhron Ya'akov on the slopes of Mount Carmel, conducted research programs and promoted social and psychological projects, both in Israel and internationally. While its main focus was studying and researching a multitude of aspects of the Israeli society from sociological and psychological perspectives, under Gal's personal supervision the Carmel Institute also initiated many international projects based on its body of knowledge. Among these projects was the "Helping-the-Helpers" program designed to assist and support mental-health professionals in the former Yugoslavia countries (Bosnia-Herzegovina, Serbia, Croatia, Kosovo) throughout their civil wars (1992–2001). Gal served as the Director of the Carmel Institute from 1985 to 2002, and President from 2002 until its closure in 2004. During this time period, he published widely on a range of scholarly topics.

In 1991, Gal, together with two colleagues, founded the Center for Outstanding Leadership (COL) (which had as its roots the ideas and philosophies of the Carmel Institute) in Zikhron Ya’akov, Israel. The Center specialized in long-term, in-depth leadership development programs. To this day, the COL has trained and supervised hundreds of leading Israeli CEO's and leaders of various institutions. In 1998, in collaboration with the JDC-Israel, the COL conducted a year-long leadership program for young Jewish activists in the Former Soviet Union (FSU), sponsored by the Schusterman Foundation. At present, the Institute for Quality leadership is active globally, still based on its original philosophy.

== Promotion of peace and co-existence ==
Since his retirement from the military career in 1983, Gal has focused on strategies for achieving peaceful co-existence in the Middle East. He serves as a member of the Board of Advisors for The Abraham Fund Initiatives (TAFI) Council, a non-profit organization dedicated to advancing co-existence, equality and cooperation between Israel's Jewish and Arab citizens. It was founded in 1989 by Alan B. Slifka and the late Eugene Weiner (both Gal's close friends) and named for the common ancestor of both Jews and Arabs.

From 2005 to 2007 Dr. Gal served as a senior consultant to the Alan B. Slifka Foundation, planning and designing the Co-existence Leadership Institute for Jews and Arabs in Israel. In May 2006, as part of this project, he published an extensive report entitled “Enhancing Co-existence through Multiple Channels of Influence: A Strategic Scheme to Change the Quality of Arab-Jewish Relationships in Israel.” Between 2006 and 2007, Gal was a senior fellow, sponsored by The Richard and Rodah Goldman Research Scholarship Foundation, at the Harold Hartog School of Government and Policy at Tel Aviv University. His position paper –"The Perceived Subject of Rights and Duties of Israeli-Arab Citizens in Light of the 'National Civic Service' Perspective" was submitted in October 2007.

Between 2006 and 2007, Gal was a senior fellow, sponsored by The Richard and Rodah Goldman Research Scholarship Foundation, at the Harold Hartog School of Government and Policy at Tel Aviv University. His position paper –"The Perceived Subject of Rights and Duties of Israeli-Arab Citizens in Light of the 'National Civic Service' Perspective" was submitted in October 2007.

In 2007, Gal established the Administration for National Civic Service (ANCS), under the Prime Minister's office. One of its primary intentions was to include young Israeli Arab volunteers in various community services – thus becoming a strategy for achieving better cooperation and equity between Jews and Arabs in Israel.

== Building a Peace Trail ==
Reuven Gal speaks about his idea for a Middle East Peace Trail at the 2010 National Conference on Volunteering and Service in New York City. (View in high quality)

One of Gal's most notable initiatives was the idea of building a Middle-East Peace Trail, spanning five countries in the Middle East, to be built by youth volunteers from Israel and its Arab neighbouring countries. This effort - to support the evolution of peace and understanding between Israelis and Arabs - has yet not been materialized. In 2009, Dr. Gal shared the idea at a forum sponsored by the Shinnyo-en Foundation called the “Six Billion Paths to Peace: Reflection and Dialogue.”

== Governmental Positions ==
From 2002 to 2004, Gal served as the Deputy National Security Advisor for Domestic Policy at the Israeli National Security Council (NSC). Among his responsibilities were issues such as security of national infrastructures, national resiliency, the improvement of the conditions of Arab minorities (Muslims, Christians, Bedouins, Druze and others) in Israel, and the connection between the State of Israel and Jewish Diaspora.

In 2006, Gal wrote the book Service without Guns in collaboration with American author Donald J. Eberly, establishing himself as a proponent of non-military national youth service. In the book, he makes the point that, "Young people everywhere would much rather cooperate with other young people in constructive activities than engage them in combat."

Subsequently, and with the support of two consecutive Israeli Prime Ministers (Ariel Sharon and Ehud Olmert), Gal played an instrumental role in establishing a national system to encourage young people who are exempted from the military draft to serve, as civilians and on a voluntary base, in local communities and in various Governmental and non-Government (NGO) frameworks, mostly in education, health and environmental assignments. This resulted in the creation of The Administration for National Civic Service (ANCS), the organization which he headed from 2007 to 2009.

As part of the ANCS's mission, Gal was involved in efforts to modify the Tal laws (named after retired judge Tzvi Tal, who headed the committee under prime minister Ehud Barak) which dealt with the special exemption from mandatory military service given to Israeli Ultra Orthodox Jews. In 2008, the Israeli daily newspaper Haaretz reported that under the policies of the new ANCS "the number of Ultra-Orthodox youth who opt for national civic service instead of joining the army has doubled in recent months."

Gal also initiated the inclusion in the ANCS of young people with disabilities, both mental and physical.

== Consultant field-work and Academic activities ==
During the civil wars in the Balkans (1992–1995) and in Kosovo (1996–1999), Dr. Gal served as a consultant on post-traumatic stress in the former Yugoslavia countries (Bosnia-Herzegovina, Croatia, Serbia, Macedonia and Kosovo) on behalf of UK Jewish Aid & International Development (UKJAID) and in collaboration with UNICEF.

In the aftermath of the 1995 earthquake in Japan, Gal (together with his wife, Ivria, a clinical-psychologist and family-therapist) travelled to the destroyed city of Kobe to train Japanese mental-health professionals in how to treat and cope with the post-traumatic effects of that disaster.

Following his participation in the fact-finding mission in Northern Ireland (1995), Gal initiated several seminars on models for coexistence between Jews and Arabs in Israel through joint professional teams. In the following years he was engaged as a consultant in various Jewish-Arab co-existence programs.

Another project he supported was the organization and feasibility studies of the “World Jewish Peace Corps”—an effort to create a network of young Jewish volunteers serving internationally in non-Jewish, disaster-stricken communities.World Jewish Peace Corps Near

Dr. Gal served as a member of the Board of Directors (2010-2019) at the University of Haifa. He is currently a member of the Board of Governorsof this University – an academic institute emphasizing the integration of Israeli-Arab students in its many facultiesץ

In 2011 Dr. Gal founded the Association of Civil-Military Studies in Israel and served as its first Chair, till 2017. He is a member of its journal, Military, Society, and National Security, since its foundation. In addition, he was a member of the Inter-University Seminar (IUS) Council, and on the Editorial Board of Armed Forces & Society.

Since 2010 Dr. Gal has been a Senior Research Fellow at the Samuel Neaman Institute for National Policy Research, where he headed (till June 2026) the Resilience, Community and Society Forum. Within his academic activities, Gal's special interest (in the last decade) is in the areas of national resilience and enhancing social resilience; in studying the Ultra-Orthodox sector in Israel; in studying changing trends in attitudes of Israeli youth; and in creating a “Common Ground” within the Israeli society.

Throughout the years, Gal held teaching positions at various universities abroad: U. C. Berkeley, Boston University (BU), University of British Columbia (UBC), University of Southern Florida (USF), Australian Defence Force Academy (ADFA), Masaryk University (Brno, Czech Republic). In addition, he served as PI in numerous research projects (with grants from NIMH, ISF, BSF, Ford Foundation, US Army, and various Israeli-Government offices and non-government organizations). He also serves as mentor and supervisor to many Doctoral students, in the above-mentioned subjects.

== Awards ==
Gal has been the recipient of numerous honours and awards, including:

- Charles Atwood Kofoid Eugenics Fellowship, University of California, Berkeley (1973–1974)
- Goewey Fellowship, University of California, Berkeley (1974–1975)
- Visiting Fellow, Centre for Judaic Studies, Boston University (1984–1985)
- Senior Research Associateship, National Research Council (NRC), National Academy of Science, at the Walter Reed Army Institute of Research, Washington, D.C. (1983–1985)
- Research Grant, National Institute of Mental Health (NIMH) (1990–1993)
- Senior Fellow (The Richard and Rodah Goldman Research Scholarship Foundation) at the Harold Hartog School of Government and Policy, Tel Aviv University, Israel (2006–2007)
- The Morris Janowitz Career Achievement Award from the Inter-University Seminar on Armed Forces and Society, Chicago, October 2013.
- An Honorary Award from the Association of Civil-Military Studies in Israel, February 2018.
