= Jenia Berkman =

Israeli footballer

Jenia Berkman ג'ניה ברקמן
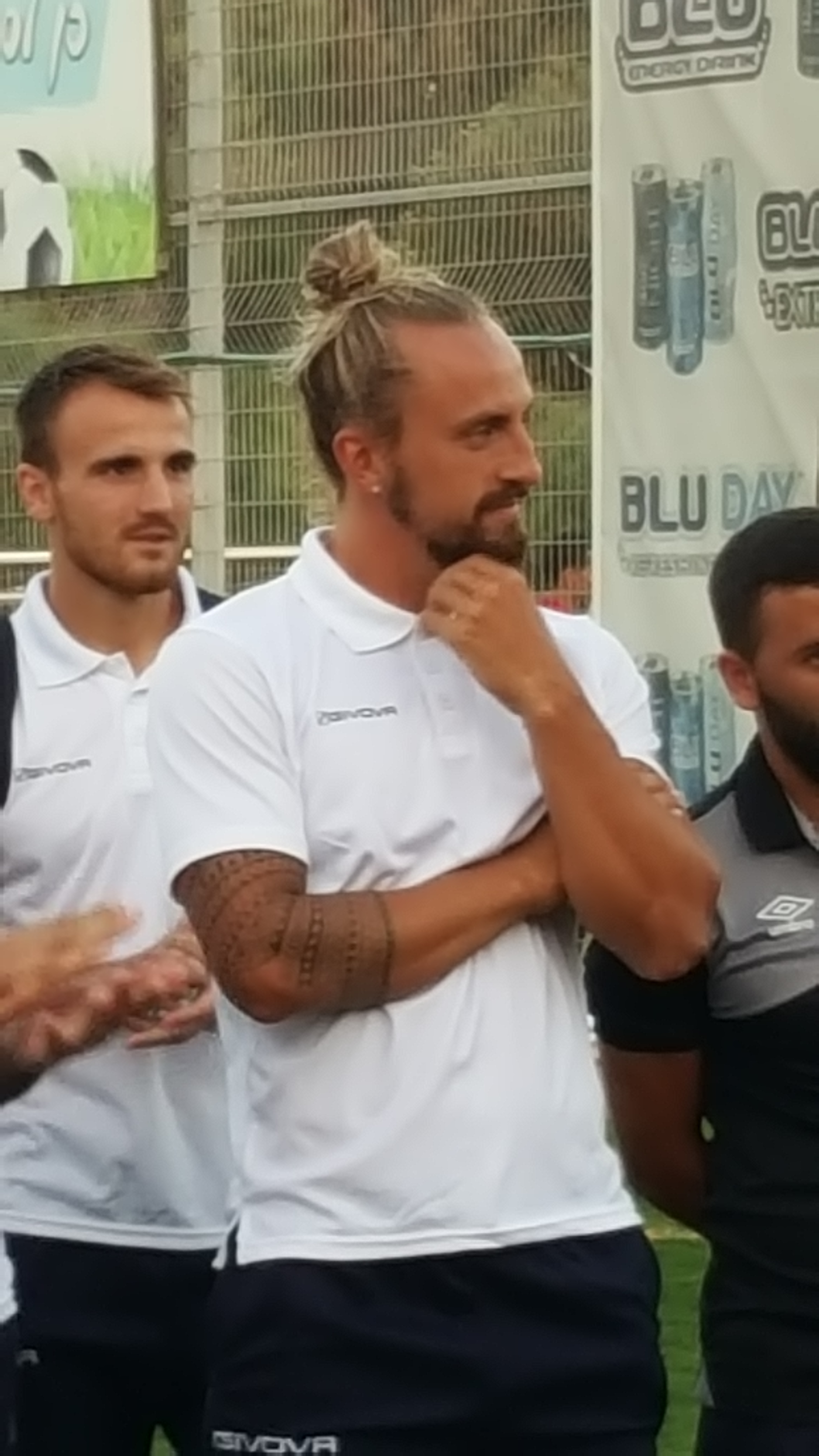

Personal information
- Full name: Yevgeny Berkman
- Date of birth: 9 September 1991 (age 35)
- Place of birth: Nazareth Illit, Israel
- Height: 1.90 m (6 ft 3 in)
- Position: Center back

Team information
- Current team: Hapoel Beit She'an
- Number: 5

Youth career
- 2000–2010: Hapoel Nazareth Illit

Senior career*
Years	Team	Apps	(Gls)
2010–2018	Hapoel Nazareth Illit	264	(16)
2018–2020	Hapoel Kfar Saba	62	(1)
2020–2026	Hapoel Nof HaGalil	207	(22)
2026–	Hapoel Beit She'an	0	(0)

International career
2011	Israel U-21	1	(0)
- * Club domestic league appearances and goals as of 15 June 2026

Yevgeny "Jenia" Berkman (Hebrew: יבגני "ג'ניה" ברקמן; born September 29, 1991) is an Israeli footballer who plays as a defender for Hapoel Beit She'an.

== Career ==
Berkman played for Hapoel Nazareth Illit youth teams, serving as captain in each age group. He had graduated to the senior team in 2010, playing for the club ever since. In summer 2014 Berkman trialed with Premier League club Hapoel Petah Tikva, but the move fell through and Berkman stayed with Nazareth Illit.

Berkman played one match for the Israel U-21 team, against Albania.
