= Moti Malka =

Israeli footballer

Personal information
- Full name: Mordechai Malka
- Date of birth: 13 December 1990 (age 35)
- Place of birth: Nof HaGalil, Israel
- Position: Forward

Team information
- Current team: Hapoel Nof HaGalil

Youth career
- Hapoel Nof HaGalil

Senior career*
Years	Team	Apps	(Gls)
2009–2011	Hapoel Nof HaGalil	32	(21)
2011–2012	Hapoel Be'er Sheva	9	(3)
2012–2013	Hapoel Nof HaGalil	27	(8)
2013	Hapoel Rishon LeZion	10	(1)
2014	Hapoel Marmorek	11	(7)
2014–2015	Ironi Nesher	6	(0)
2015–2016	Hapoel Nof HaGalil	18	(6)
2016	Maccabi Netanya	10	(1)
2016–2017	Hapoel Nof HaGalil	29	(3)
2017–2018	Hapoel Kafr Kanna	30	(18)
2018–2019	Hapoel Ramat HaSharon	33	(16)
2019–2021	Bnei Sakhnin	43	(14)
2021–2022	Hapoel Nof HaGalil	13	(0)
2022	F.C. Kafr Qasim	12	(2)
2022–2023	Hapoel Nof HaGalil	20	(4)
- * Club domestic league appearances and goals

Moti Malka (Hebrew: מוטי מלכה; born 12 December 1990) is an Israeli former footballer.
