= Eran Malkin =

Israeli footballer

Eran Malkin ערן מלכין
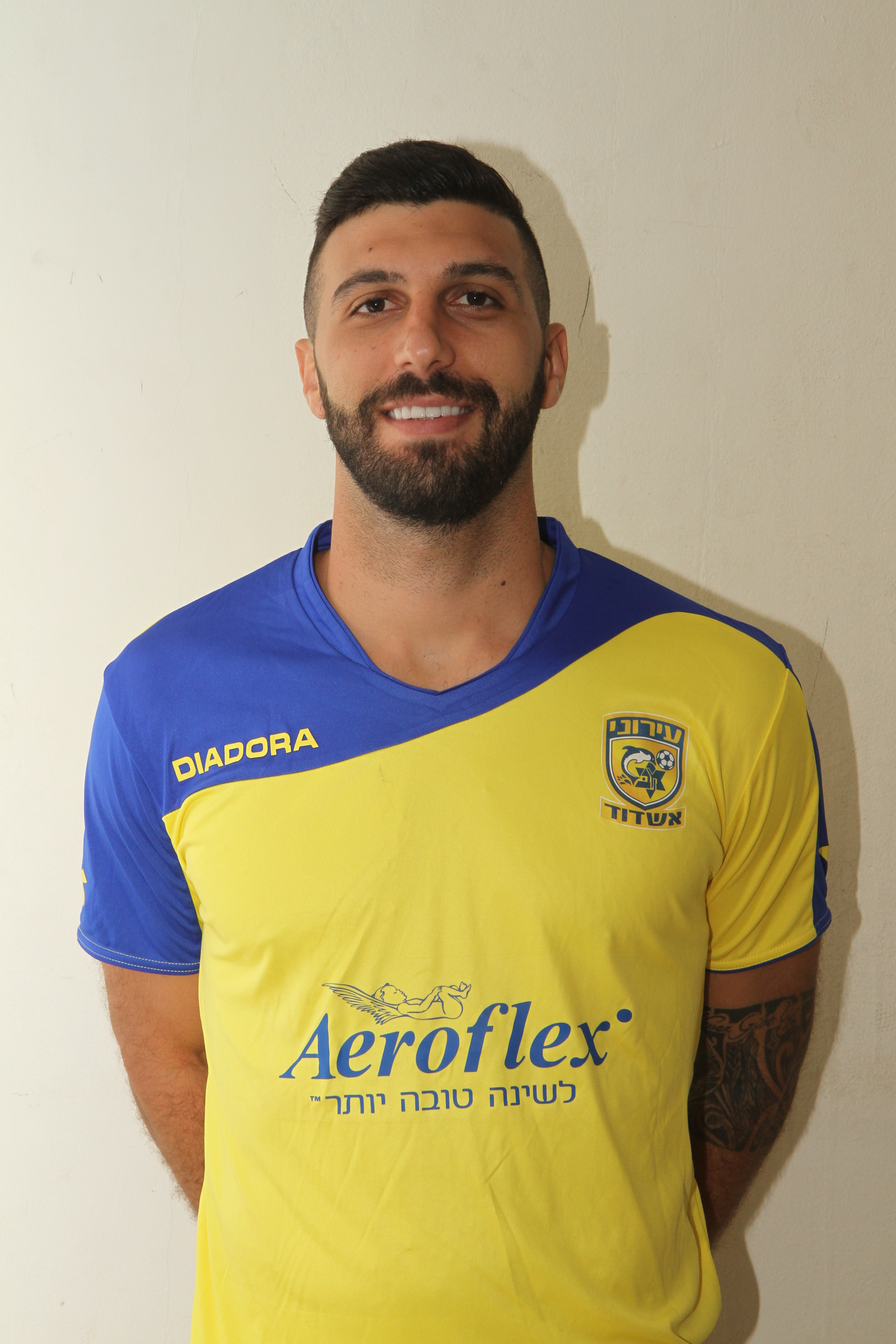

Personal information
- Full name: Eran Malkin
- Date of birth: 22 March 1993 (age 33)
- Place of birth: Tel Adashim, Israel
- Height: 1.78 m (5 ft 10 in)
- Position: Midfielder

Youth career
- Maccabi Haifa

Senior career*
| Years | Team | Apps | (Gls) |
| 2012–2016 | Maccabi Haifa | 0 | (0) |
| 2012–2016 | → Hapoel Nazareth Illit(loan) | 95 | (13) |
| 2016 | → Maccabi Herzliya (loan) | 8 | (0) |
| 2016 | Hapoel Herzliya | 7 | (0) |
| 2016–2018 | Maccabi Ironi Ashdod | 54 | (14) |
- * Club domestic league appearances and goals

Eran Malkin (Hebrew: ערן מלכין; born 22 March 1993) is an Israeli former footballer who played as a midfielder. He was play also for Maccabi Ironi Ashdod.

In October 2018, he retired from football.
