= Ibrahim Basit =

Ghanaian footballer

Personal information
- Full name: Ibrahim Basit
- Date of birth: October 13, 1990 (age 36)
- Place of birth: Ghana
- Position: Striker

Team information
- Current team: Al Nahda Club, Oman
- Number: 90

Senior career*
Years	Team	Apps	(Gls)
2007–2009	King Faisal Babes		
2009	Bnei Sakhnin	8	(2)
2009–2010	Hapoel Petah Tikva	11	(5)
2010–2012	Hapoel Be'er Sheva	22	(1)
2011–2012	→ Maccabi Umm al-Fahm (loan)	27	(9)
2012–2015	Hapoel Nazareth Illit	80	(20)
2016–present	Al Nahda Club, Oman	16	(7)
- * Club domestic league appearances and goals

Ibrahim Basit (born 13 October 1990) is a Ghanaian footballer who plays for Al Nahda Club in Oman's OPL.
