= Eliran Hudeda =

Israeli footballer

Eliran Hudeda אלירן חודדה
Personal information
- Full name: Eliran Hudeda
- Date of birth: October 3, 1981 (age 45)
- Place of birth: Kiryat Tiv'on, Israel
- Height: 1.93 m (6 ft 4 in)
- Position: Center back

Team information
- Current team: Ironi Tiberias (manager)

Youth career
- F.C. Neve Yosef

Senior career*
Years	Team	Apps	(Gls)
2002–2004	Maccabi Ironi Kiryat Ata		
2004–2005	Beitar Jerusalem	4	(2)
2005–2006	Bnei Sakhnin	19	(1)
2006–2007	Hapoel Haifa	32	(7)
2007–2009	Maccabi Ahi Nazareth	26	(7)
2009–2010	Hapoel Nazareth Illit	63	(6)
2010–2012	Maccabi Ahi Nazareth	65	(15)
2012–2016	Hapoel Nazareth Illit	147	(28)
2016–2017	Hapoel Hadera	19	(8)
2017–2018	Hapoel Iksal	28	(9)
2018–2019	Maccabi Kiryat Ata	12	(0)

Managerial career
- 2019: Maccabi Kiryat Ata (Sporting Director)
- 2019–2020: Hapoel Baqa al-Gharbiyye
- 2020–2021: Hapoel Iksal
- 2021: Hapoel Ra'anana
- 2021–: Ironi Tiberias
- * Club domestic league appearances and goals

Eliran Hudeda (Hebrew: אלירן חודדה; born 3 October 1981) is a former Israeli footballer who currently works as a manager at Ironi Tiberias.

== Biography ==
He is of a Tunisian-Jewish descent. He is a third-generation resident of Kiryat Tivon in the Haifa District. He started his football career at the age of 7 in the boys and youth teams of Maccabi Haifa and Neve Yosef.

== Personal life ==
Hudeda is married to Dana and is the father of three daughters.
