= Shimon Hadari =

Israeli football manager

Shimon Hadari שמעון הדרי
Personal information
- Full name: Shimon Hadari
- Date of birth: June 7, 1962 (age 64)
- Place of birth: Kiryat Shmona, Israel

Managerial career
- Years: Team
- 2006–2008: Maccabi Ahi Nazareth
- 2008: Maccabi Herzliya
- 2008–2009: Maccabi Ahi Nazareth
- 2009–2010: Beitar Jerusalem
- 2010–2012: Maccabi Ahi Nazareth
- 2012–2013: Hapoel Acre
- 2013–2014: Maccabi Umm al-Fahm
- 2014: Hapoel Nazareth Illit
- 2017–2019: Hapoel Umm al-Fahm
- 2019: → Ironi Kiryat Shmona
- 2019: Maccabi Herzliya
- 2021–2022: Ironi Tiberias (general manager)

Shimon Hadari (Hebrew: שמעון הדרי) is an Israeli football manager. Recently Hadari managed Ironi Kiryat Shmona, Beitar Jerusalem and Hapoel Acre in the Israeli Premier League.
