= William Owusu (footballer, born 1991) =

Ghanaian footballer

William Hazao
Personal information
- Full name: William Hazao Owusu
- Date of birth: 13 September 1991 (age 35)
- Place of birth: Ghana
- Height: 1.82 m (5 ft 11 1/2 in)
- Position: Midfielder

Team information
- Current team: Gençlik Gücü
- Number: 18

Youth career
- Sekondi Wise Fighters

Senior career*
Years	Team	Apps	(Gls)
2009–2010	Sekondi Wise Fighters	?	(?)
2010–2011	Hapoel Tel Aviv	0	(0)
2011	→ Sektzia Ness Ziona (loan)	14	(0)
2011–2013	F.C. Ashdod	0	(0)
2011–2013	→ Hapoel Kfar Saba (loan)	15	(18)
2013–2014	Beitar Tel Aviv Ramla	24	(5)
2014–2016	Hapoel Nazareth Illit	28	(5)
2017–	Gençlik Gücü	1	(1)
- * Club domestic league appearances and goals as of 13 September 2010

William Hazao Owusu (born 13 September 1991) is a Ghanaian footballer who plays for Turkish Cypriot club Gençlik Gücü.

== Career ==
William played for Sekondi Wise Fighters in the 2009/10 season Ghana Premier League season, finishing 15th in the 2009/10 Ghana Premier League season. Eli Guttman, then Hapoel Tel Aviv's Manager, enthusiastic young talents called him and asked to purchase long-term investment. After F.C. Ashdod wanted him, and they signed William as a Hapoel player to help the talented team in the league as a temporary player replacement, but after the team was unable to sign their fifth 1st choice foreign player, it was decided William will be the fifth foreign player. In January 2011, William went on loan to Sektzia Ness Ziona, playing in the second division of Israeli football.
