= Hapoel Nof HaGalil F.C. =

Israeli association football club

Hapoel Nof HaGalil
- Full name: Hapoel Nof HaGalil Football Club
- Founded: 1958; 68 years ago
- Ground: Green Stadium, Nof HaGalil
- Capacity: 5,200
- Owner: Nof HaGalil Municipality
- Chairman: Roni Likwernik
- Manager: Liran Pinto
- League: Liga Alef
- 2025–26: Liga Leumit, 15th of 16 (relegated)
- Website: hapoelnh.co.il
Home colours	Away colours

Hapoel Nof HaGalil Football Club (Hebrew: מועדון כדורגל הפועל נוף הגליל, romanized: Moadon Kaduregel Hapoel Nof HaGalil; Arabic: هبوعيل نوف هچليل) is an Israeli professional football club based in Nof HaGalil. The club was formally known by the name "Nazareth Illit" until 2019 (the club accordingly was named as Hapoel Nazareth Illit F.C.). The club currently plays in Liga Leumit.

== History ==
The club was founded in 1962 as Hapoel Kiryat Nazareth and competed in Liga Gimel for several seasons, before promoting to Liga Bet at the end of the 1971–72 season. The club changed its name in 1973 after Kiryat Nazareth gained city status and was renamed Nazareth Illit.

The club won 1975–76 Liga Bet, but, due to the league system restructuring, the club remained in the league system's third tier, which became Liga Alef. In 1978–79 the club won Liga Alef North division and was promoted to Liga Artzit, then the second tier. In 1983–84 they finished second from bottom, and were relegated to Liga Alef. Two seasons later the club finished second from bottom in Liga Alef and dropped to Liga Bet.

In 1998–99 the club finished as runners-up in Liga Alef North, and was promoted back to Liga Artzit, which was now the third tier following the formation of the Israeli Premier League in 1999. After narrowly avoiding relegation in 2000–01 when they finished one place above the relegation zone, the club finished as runners-up the following season, and were promoted back to the second tier. In 2003–04 they finished as runners-up (on goal difference), and were promoted to the top division for the first time in their history.

In their first season in the Premier League the club finished fifth. Home matches were initially played at Maccabi Ahi Nazareth's Ilut Stadium, whilst their home ground had floodlights installed. They returned home in February 2005. However, the following season, 2005–06, they finished second from bottom (on goal difference), and returned to Liga Leumit. In 2007–08 they finished bottom of Liga Leumit, and were relegated to Liga Artzit.

Despite only finishing seventh in Liga Artzit in 2008–09, F.C. Nazareth Illit were promoted back to Liga Leumit as restructuring meant the top seven clubs were automatically promoted. Since then, Nazareth Illit hasn't been relegated for 3 consecutive seasons, finishing seventh in 2009–10, 11th in 2010–11 and twelfth in 2011–12.

In the 2012–13 season the club signed several new players, including Ibrahim Basit, Eran Malchin and Moti Malka; they finished second in the league, but lost 3–1 at home in a crucial match against Hapoel Ra'anana in the play-offs, with Ra'anana eventually promoted to the Israeli Premier League, whilst Nazareth Illit finished third and remained in Liga Leumit. In 2018–19 the club finished the regular season at the top of the table, but a collapse during the playoff phase, with the club collecting just 7 points out of 21, led the club to finish in third place and miss out on promotion.

On 4 July 2019, after the name of Nazareth Illit was changed to Nof HaGalil, the club changed its name to Hapoel Nof HaGalil.

== Current squad ==
Updated 29 March, 2026.

No.	Pos.	Nation	Player
1	GK	ISR	Tamir Lalou
2	DF	ISR	Omri Ohana
3	DF	MLI	Hamidou Diallo
4	DF	BRA	Pedro Sass
5	DF	ISR	Jenia Berkman
6	DF	ISR	Liam Bitan
7	FW	ISR	Anas Dabour
8	MF	ISR	Julian Shelufe
9	MF	ISR	Ohad Rabinovich
10	FW	ISR	Idan Golan
11	FW	ISR	Nehorai Ifrach
12	MF	ISR	Matanel Tadesa
14	FW	ISR	Shahar Hirsh
15	FW	NGA	Peter Onyekachi

No.	Pos.	Nation	Player
17	DF	ISR	Ayman Ali
18	DF	ISR	Shay Mosinenko
19	FW	ZAM	Kennedy Musonda
20	DF	ISR	Dolev Azulay
21	DF	ISR	Mufalah Shlaata
22	FW	ISR	Ido Elmshily
23	MF	ISR	Amit Gorvich
24	DF	ISR	Daniel Mor Yosef
27	MF	ISR	Or Dasa
28	FW	ISR	Muhammad Taha
52	DF	ISR	Itamar Guri
55	FW	ISR	Ofek Osher
95	GK	ISR	Ido Artzi

== Honours ==
=== League ===
- Third tier:
  - Winners: 1975–76, 1978–79
- Fourth tier:
  - Winners: 1971–72

=== Cups ===
- Liga Bet North A Division Cup:
  - Winners: 1986–87
- Toto Cup Leumit:
  - Winners: 2020–21
