= 2017–18 Israel State Cup =

Tournament details
- Country: Israel

Final positions
- Champions: Hapoel Haifa
- Runners-up: Beitar Jerusalem

Tournament statistics
- Matches played: 145
- Goals scored: 530 (3.66 per match)

The 2017–18 Israel State Cup (Hebrew: גביע המדינה, Gvia HaMedina) was the 79th season of Israel's nationwide Association football cup competition and the 64th after the Israeli Declaration of Independence.

The competition commenced in September 2017.

== Preliminary rounds ==
=== First to fourth rounds ===
Rounds 1 to 4 double as cup competition for each division in Liga Bet and Liga Gimel. The two third-Round winners from each Liga Bet division and the fourth-Round winner from each Liga Gimel division advance to the sixth Round.

==== Liga Bet ====
===== Liga Bet North A =====
Home team	Score	Away team
First Round
Second Round
Ihud Bnei Majd al-Krum	w/o	Hapoel Kaukab
Ihud Bnei Kabul	2–3	Bnei HaGolan VeHaGalil
Beitar Nahariya	3–3 (a.e.t.) (1–3 p)	Tzeirei Kafr Kanna
Ahva Kafr Manda	w/o	Ihud Bnei Sumei
Third Round
Ihud Bnei Sumei	1–2	Hapoel Kaukab
Bnei HaGolan VeHaGalil	5–3	Tzeirei Kafr Kanna
Fourth Round
Bnei HaGolan VeHaGalil	1–3	Hapoel Kaukab

Hapoel Kaukab won the district cup and qualified along with Bnei HaGolan VeHagalil to the sixth round.

===== Liga Bet North B =====
Home team	Score	Away team
First Round
Al-Nahda Nazareth	1–0	Maccabi Ahi Iksal
Hapoel Ramot Menashe Megiddo	0–2	F.C. Daburiyya
Hapoel Bnei Ar'ara 'Ara	1–5	Hapoel Bnei Zalafa
Hapoel Daliyat al-Karmel	2–1	Hapoel Bnei Fureidis
Second Round
Hapoel Bnei Zalafa	2–4	Hapoel Daliyat al-Karmel
Hapoel Tirat HaCarmel	1–3	Tzeirei Tur'an
F.C. Daburiyya	w/o	Maccabi Nujeidat
Ihud Bnei Kafr Qara	1–1 (a.e.t.) (2–4 p)	Al-Nahda Nazareth
Third Round
F.C. Daburiyya	4–0	Tzeirei Tur'an
Al-Nahda Nazareth	0–4	Hapoel Daliyat al-Karmel
Fourth Round
F.C. Daburiyya	1–1 (a.e.t.) (5–3 p)	Hapoel Daliyat al-Karmel

F.C. Daburiyya won the district cup and qualified along with Hapoel Daliyat al-Karmel to the sixth round.

===== Liga Bet South A =====
Home team	Score	Away team
First Round
Hapoel Nahlat Yehuda	1–1 (a.e.t.) (1–3 p)	Roei Heshbon Tel Aviv
Hapoel Pardesiya	3–2 (a.e.t.)	Hapoel Ihud Bnei Jatt
Ironi Beit Dagan	0–3	F.C. Tzeirei Tayibe
Shimshon Tel Aviv	3–0	Maccabi Ironi Amishav Petah Tikva
Beitar Petah Tikva	3–1	Hapoel Kafr Qasim Shouaa
Hapoel Kiryat Ono	1–2 (a.e.t.)	Shimshon Kafr Qasim
Second Round
Ironi Or Yehuda	2–0	Roei Heshbon Tel Aviv
Shimshon Bnei Tayibe	2–1	Shimshon Tel Aviv
F.C. Tzeirei Tayibe	1–0	Beitar Petah Tikva
Shimshon Kafr Qasim	4–1	Hapoel Pardesiya
Third Round
Ironi Or Yehuda	3–1	Shimshon Kafr Qasim
F.C. Tzeirei Tayibe	0–1	Shimshon Bnei Tayibe
Fourth Round
Shimshon Bnei Tayibe	3–5	Ironi Or Yehuda

Ironi Or Yehuda won the district cup and qualified along with Shimshon Bnei Tayibe to the sixth round.

===== Liga Bet South B =====
Home team	Score	Away team
First Round
A.S Ashdod	1–2	Maccabi Ironi Sderot
Maccabi Kiryat Malakhi	1–0	Maccabi Be'er Sheva
Beitar Ma'ale Adumim	3–1	Ironi Modi'in
Bnei Eilat	0–1	Hapoel Yeruham
F.C. Shikun HaMizrah	6–0	Bnei Yeechalal Rehovot
Maccabi Ironi Netivot	1–5	Maccabi Ironi Ashdod
F.C. Be'er Sheva	5–0	Tzeirei Rahat
Second Round
F.C. Be'er Sheva	3–1	Beitar Givat Ze'ev
Maccabi Ironi Sderot	0–2	Maccabi Kiryat Malakhi
Maccabi Ironi Ashdod	2–0	Beitar Ma'ale Adumim
F.C. Shikun HaMizrah	4–4 (a.e.t.) (4–5 p)	Hapoel Yeruham
Third Round
Maccabi Ironi Ashdod	3–1 (a.e.t.)	Hapoel Yeruham
F.C. Be'er Sheva	1–2	Maccabi Kiryat Malakhi
Fourth Round
Maccabi Kiryat Malakhi	2–2 (a.e.t.) (5–6 p)	Maccabi Ironi Ashdod

Maccabi Ashdod won the district cup and qualified along with Maccabi Kiryat Malakhi to the sixth round.

==== Liga Gimel ====
===== Liga Gimel Upper Galilee =====
Home team	Score	Away team
First Round
Second Round
Third Round
Hapoel Bnei Tuba-Zangariyye	1–1 (a.e.t.) (6–7 p)	F.C. Hatzor HaGlilit
Maccabi Ahva Sha'ab	2–1	Maccabi Ahva Yarka
Fourth Round
F.C. Hatzor HaGlilit	2–2 (a.e.t.) (2–4 p)	Maccabi Ahva Sha'ab

Maccabi Ahva Sha'ab won the district cup and qualified to the sixth round.

===== Liga Gimel Lower Galilee =====
Home team	Score	Away team
First Round
Second Round
Third Round
Maccabi Ironi Yafa	w/o	Maccabi Ironi Tamra
Hapoel Ironi Bnei I'billin	3–1	Maccabi Kiryat Yam
Fourth Round
Hapoel Ironi Bnei I'billin	3–4	Maccabi Ironi Tamra

Maccabi Ironi Tamra won the district cup and qualified to the sixth round.

===== Liga Gimel Jezreel =====
Home team	Score	Away team
First Round
Second Round
Third Round
Maccabi Ahi Ar'ara 'Ara	0–2	Beitar Ein Mahil
Bnei Musmus	4–0	Beitar Umm al-Fahm
Fourth Round
Bnei Musmus	3–0	Beitar Ein Mahil

Hapoel Bnei Musmus won the district cup and qualified to the sixth round.

===== Liga Gimel Shomron =====
Home team	Score	Away team
First Round
Second Round
Hapoel Ironi Or Akiva	2–2 (a.e.t.) (8–9 p)	F.C. Pardes Hanna Karkur
Beitar Haifa	1–0	Tzeirei Ironi Baqa
Hapoel Kiryat Haim	2–6 (a.e.t.)	Maccabi Neve Sha'anan
Third Round
Beitar Haifa	1–6	Hapoel Ahva Haifa
F.C. Pardes Hanna Karkur	3–1	Maccabi Neve Sha'anan
Fourth Round
F.C. Pardes Hanna Karkur	5–1	Hapoel Ahva Haifa

F.C. Pardes Hanna Karkur won the district cup and qualified to the sixth round.

===== Liga Gimel Sharon =====
Home team	Score	Away team
First Round
Beitar Tubruk	0–3	F.C. Tira
Second Round
Sporting Tel Aviv	1–2	Hapoel Oranit
Maccabi HaSharon Netanya	0–3	Bnei Ra'anana
Tzeirei Tira	0–2	Ironi Ariel
Maccabi Ironi Kfar Yona	0–1	F.C. Netanya
Third Round
Hapoel Oranit	1–2	Bnei Ra'anana
Ironi Ariel	6–1	F.C. Netanya
Fourth Round
Bnei Ra'anana	3–3 (a.e.t.) (1–3 p)	Ironi Ariel

Ironi Ariel won the district cup and qualified to the sixth round.

===== Liga Gimel Tel Aviv =====
Home team	Score	Away team
First Round
Hapoel Tzafririm Holon	2–3	Inter Aliyah
Otzma Holon	7–1	Maccabi Ironi Or Yehuda
Beitar Ramat Gan	w/o	Beitar Jaffa
Second Round
Elitzur Jaffa Tel Aviv	w/o	Maccabi Spartak Ramat Gan
Shikun Vatikim Ramat Gan	4–3	Beitar Ramat Gan
Inter Aliyah	0–1	Bnei Yehud
Otzma Holon	w/o	Maccabi HaShikma Hen
Third Round
Bnei Yehud	6–4	Otzma Holon
Maccabi Spartak Ramat Gan	2–4	Shikun Vatikim Ramat Gan
Fourth Round
Shikun Vatikim Ramat Gan	5–2	Bnei Yehud

Shikun Vatikim Ramat Gan won the district cup and qualified to the sixth round.

===== Liga Gimel Center =====
Home team	Score	Away team
First Round
Hapoel Lod	2–0	Hapoel Tirat Shalom
Hapoel Ramla	3–2	Hapoel Mevaseret Zion
Beitar Yavne	w/o	Hapoel Ironi Gedera
Second Round
Hapoel Bnei Ashdod	5–1	Tzeirei Lod
Hapoel Ramla	w/o	Beitar Ashdod
Hapoel Abirei Bat Yam	w/o	Hapoel Lod
F.C. Rishon LeZion	1–5	Beitar Yavne
Third Round
Hapoel Ramla	2–4	Hapoel Bnei Ashdod
Hapoel Lod	0–1	Beitar Yavne
Fourth Round
Hapoel Bnei Ashdod	4–2	Beitar Yavne

Hapoel Bnei Ashdod won the district cup and qualified to the sixth round.

===== Liga Gimel South =====
Home team	Score	Away team
First Round
Second Round
F.C. Arad	3–4	Maccabi Ironi Hura
F.C. Be'er Sheva Haim Levy	w/o	Maccabi Dimona
A.S. Ashkelon	0–2	Beitar Kiryat Gat
Hapoel Rahat	2–1	Ironi Kuseife
Third Round
Maccabi Ironi Hura	0–9	Beitar Kiryat Gat
F.C. Be'er Sheva Haim Levy	2–4	Hapoel Rahat
Fourth Round
Beitar Kiryat Gat	4–2	Hapoel Rahat

Beitar Kiryat Gat won the district cup and qualified to the sixth round.

=== Fifth Round ===
The fifth Round is played within each division of Liga Alef. The winners qualify to the sixth Round

Home team	Score	Away team
Liga Alef North
F.C. Tira	2–3	Hapoel Jerusalem
Hapoel Herzliya	0–1	Hapoel Asi Gilboa
Hapoel Iksal	4–4 (a.e.t.) (4–2 p)	Hapoel Umm al-Fahm
Hapoel Kafr Kanna	2–2 (a.e.t.) (1–4 p)	Hapoel Beit She'an
Hapoel Migdal HaEmek	0–2	Hapoel Shefa-'Amr
Maccabi Daliyat al-Karmel	1–0	Ironi Tiberias
Maccabi Ironi Kiryat Ata	0–1 (a.e.t.)	F.C. Haifa Robi Shapira
Maccabi Tzur Shalom	1–3	Hapoel Ironi Baqa al-Gharbiyye
Liga Alef South
Nordia Jerusalem	1–0	Hakoah Amidar Ramat Gan
F.C. Dimona	2–1	Hapoel Mahane Yehuda
F.C. Kafr Qasim	1–0	F.C. Holon Yermiyahu
Hapoel Azor	1–2 (a.e.t.)	Maccabi Kabilio Jaffa
Hapoel Hod HaSharon	2–2 (a.e.t.) (1–4 p)	Beitar Kfar Saba
Hapoel Kfar Shalem	1–0 (a.e.t.)	Maccabi Sha'arayim
Maccabi Kiryat Gat	0–2	Sektzia Nes Tziona
Maccabi Yavne	1–3	Hapoel Bik'at HaYarden

== Sixth Rounds ==
7 November 2017	Hapoel Bnei Musmus (5)	1–0 (a.e.t.)	Hapoel Jerusalem (3)	Umm al-Fahm
19:30	Dibi 110'	Report		Stadium: HaShalom Stadium; Referee: Arnes Duka

10 November 2017	Hapoel Asi Gilboa (3)	2–3	Bnei HaGolan VeHaGalil (4)	Afula
12:00	Fudi 49'; Shapsha 85'	Report	45', 66', 90+2' Amasha	Stadium: Afula Synthetic; Referee: Dor Tamir

10 November 2017	F.C Haifa Robi Shapira (3)	2–1	Maccabi Ironi Tamra (5)	Haifa
13:00	Ohayon 34'; Kovalski 75'	Report	41' Awad	Stadium: Avi Ran Ground; Referee: Luay Wahabe

10 November 2017	Hapoel Ironi Baqa al-Gharbiyye (3)	1–2	Hapoel Iksal (3)	Jatt
13:00	Ifrah 56'	Report	29' Ganayem; 42' Buaron	Stadium: Municipal Stadium; Referee: Yoni Kelez

10 November 2017	F.C. Pardes Hanna-Karkur (5)	2–4	F.C. Daburiyya (4)	Pardes Hanna-Karkur
13:00	Atias 42' (pen.), 78'	Report	27', 36', 58', 62' Malka	Stadium: Municipal Stadium; Referee: Daniel Braunstein

10 November 2017	Hapoel Beit She'an (3)	5–0	Maccabi Ahva Sha'ab (5)	Beit She'an
13:00	Sadan 21'; Levi 29'; Swisa 72', 76', 78'	Report		Stadium: Municipal Stadium; Referee: Itay Mazar

10 November 2017	Beitar Kiryat Gat (5)	1–2	F.C. Dimona (3)	Kiryat Gat
12:00	Shlomo 16'	Report	22' Barda; 89' Zaguri	Stadium: Kiryat Gat New Synthetic; Referee: Vitali Bondarev

10 November 2017	Maccabi Ashdod (4)	1–1 (a.e.t.) (1–3 p)	Hapoel Kfar Shalem (3)	Ashdod
13:00	Fliker 18' (pen.)	Report	2' Mazor	Stadium: The Synthetic; Referee: Ro'I Kramer
	Penalties
	Fliker (penalty scored); Zohar (penalty missed); Fulbarsh (penalty missed); Takela (penalty missed)		(penalty scored) Aharon; (penalty scored) Magol; (penalty scored) Mordechai

10 November 2017	Beitar Kfar Saba (3)	2–0	Maccabi Kiryat Malakhi (4)	Kfar Saba
12:30	Avara 54', 83'	Report		Stadium: Levita Stadium; Referee: Yosef Brailovsky

10 November 2017	Hapoel Bik'at HaYarden (3)	1–3	F.C. Kafr Qasim (3)	Tomer
12:15	Mizrahi 73'	Report	18' (pen.), 87' Lutati; 79' Cohen	Stadium: Moshav Tomer Ground; Referee: Gal Levi

10 November 2017	Ironi Ariel (5)	0–0 (a.e.t.) (2–3 p)	Ironi Or Yehuda (4)	Jaljulia
12:45		Report		Stadium: Jaljulia Stadium; Referee: Aviv Amdurski
	Penalties
	Ben Ayun (penalty missed); Cohen (penalty scored); Tzarfati (penalty scored); Mesika (penalty missed)		(penalty missed) Badash; (penalty scored) Avramson; (penalty scored) Ya'ar; (penalty scored) Magid

10 November 2017	Hapoel Shefa-'Amr (3)	6–2	Haopel Daliyat al-Karmel (4)	Shefa-'Amr
13:30	Mundia 21'; Murjan 24'; Saba 32', 34', 42', 87'	Report	55' Abu Saleh; 61' Halabi	Stadium: Shefa-'Amr Stadium; Referee: Tumer Zuckermann

10 November 2017	Sektzia Nes Tziona (3)	4–0	Haopel Bnei Ashdod (5)	Rehovot
12:00	Omerdarker 58'; Blumenfeld 77'; Strikel 86'; Tadele 90'	Report		Stadium: Kiryat Moshe Stadium; Referee: David Tal Elgrabli

10 November 2017	Nordia Jerusalem (3)	2–0	Shimshon Bnei Tayibe (4)	Jerusalem
13:25	Hayela 76', 90'	Report		Stadium: Har Homa Stadium; Referee: Dekel Tzino

10 November 2017	Shikun Vatikim Ramat Gan (5)	1–2 (a.e.t.)	Maccabi Kabilio Jaffa (3)	Ramat Gan
13:00	Samama 76'	Report	50' Beit-Ya'akov; 105' Bibiashvili	Stadium: Ramat Gan Stadium training ground Referee: Yiftah Avraham

13 November 2017	Hapoel Kaukab (4)	2–1	Maccabi Daliyat al-Karmel (3)	Kaukab
13:30	Abdallah 27'; Ali 47'	Report	72' Habiballah	Stadium: Kaukab Stadium; Referee: Daniel Levi

== Seventh Round ==
Hapoel Kfar Saba, Hapoel Hadera, Hapoel Marmorek and Hapoel Rishon LeZion were pre-qualified for the Next Round.

19 December 2017	Hapoel Beit She'an (3)	0–3	Hapoel Kaukab (4)	Beit She'an
13:00		Report	21' Amasha; 39' Habiballah; 86' Abu Raya	Stadium: Municipal Stadium; Referee: Eden Segal

19 December 2017	Hapoel Kfar Shalem (3)	1–3	Hapoel Ramat HaSharon (2)	Tel Aviv
13:00	Aharon 19' (pen.)	Report	43' Kochav; 57' Ben Yair; 61' Magoz	Stadium: Hatikva Neighborhood Stadium; Referee: Shalev Sasson

19 December 2017	Hapoel Iksal (3)	0–2	F.C. Kafr Qasim (3)	Iksal
13:00		Report	81' (pen.) Butbul; 90' Edelstein	Stadium: Iksal Stadium; Referee: Aviram Matmon

19 December 2017	Ironi Nesher (2)	1–2	Hapoel Shefa-'Amr (3)	Nesher
19:30	Ruhana 21'	Report	77' Diab; 90+1' Morjan	Stadium: Nesher Stadium; Referee: Zvika Levi

19 December 2017	Hapoel Bnei Musmus (5)	2–2 (a.e.t.) (4–3 p)	Hapoel Bnei Lod (2)	Umm al-Fahm
19:30	Mahajna 90+2'; Mohamed Salah 94'	Report	17' (pen.) Celis; 102' Dabour	Stadium: HaShalom Stadium; Referee: Aviad Shiloach
	Penalties
	Gozlan (penalty scored); H. Agbaria (penalty scored); Dibi (penalty missed); M. Agbaria (penalty scored); M. Mahajna (penalty scored)		(penalty scored) Dabour; (penalty scored) Mashalla; (penalty missed) Merey; (penalty missed) Reuven; (penalty scored) Timothy

18 December 2017	Beitar Tel Aviv Ramla (2)	1–2	Beitar Kfar Saba (3)	Ramla
19:30	Cohen 53'	Report	44', 52' (pen.) Srur	Stadium: Municipal Stadium; Referee: Dror Cohen

19 December 2017	Hapoel Ramat Gan (2)	1–0	Maccabi Jaffa (3)	Ramat Gan
19:30	Sharon 43'	Report		Stadium: Ramat Gan Stadium; Referee: Shalom Ben Avraham

19 December 2017	Maccabi Ahi Nazareth (2)	3–0	Ironi Or Yehuda (4)	Ilut
19:30	Seaton 18'; Anza 45' (pen.); Khatib 75'	Report		Stadium: Ilut Stadium; Referee: Kobi Lechem HaCohen

19 December 2017	Sektzia Nes Tziona (3)	3–0	Maccabi Herzliya (2)	Ness Ziona
19:30	Truaa 11'; Levy 43'; Asayag 90+1'	Report		Stadium: Ness Ziona Stadium; Referee: Na'el Udah

19 December 2017	Hapoel Petah Tikva (2)	2–1	F.C. Daburiyya (4)	Petah Tikva
19:30	Izrin 35'; Shkalim 40'	Report	85' Azaiza	Stadium: HaMoshava Stadium; Referee: Gal Levi

19 December 2017	Nordia Jerusalem (3)	2–3	Bnei HaGolan VeHaGalil (4)	Jerusalem
19:30	Amram 27'; Gubza 85'	Report	21', 55' Abu Jabel; 60' Abu Salah	Stadium: Teddy Stadium; Referee: Ben Shohat

19 December 2017	Hapoel Afula (2)	0–0 (a.e.t.) (3–2 p)	Hapoel Nazareth Illit (2)	Afula
19:30		Report		Stadium: Afula Illit Stadium; Referee: Gal Leibovitch
	Penalties
	Shawat (penalty scored); Martin (penalty scored); Ryzhuk (penalty scored); Shankur (penalty missed); Seiderre (penalty missed)		(penalty scored) Dayan; (penalty missed) Elmaliach; (penalty missed) Gurfinkel; (penalty scored) Falczuk; (penalty missed) Ivgi

20 December 2017	F.C Haifa Robi Shapira (3)	2–2 (a.e.t.) (7–8 p)	Hapoel Katamon Jerusalem (2)	Nesher
19:00	Buzorgi 32', 120'	Report	20' Akpabio; 99' Tesselaar	Stadium: Nesher Stadium; Referee: Guy Berger
	Penalties
	Barak (penalty missed); Buzorgi (penalty scored); Azam (penalty missed); Nudelman (penalty scored); Hershkovitz (penalty scored); Ohayon (penalty scored); Kovalski (penalty scored); Mantsour (penalty scored); E. Cohen (penalty scored); Ali (penalty missed)		(penalty scored) Itzhak; (penalty scored) Rankevitz; (penalty scored) Danon; (penalty missed) Awisaet; (penalty missed) Baruchyan; (penalty scored) Maman; (penalty scored) Peso; (penalty scored) Jan; (penalty scored) Akpabio; (penalty scored) Ziat

20 December 2017	Hapoel Tel Aviv (2)	2–1	F.C. Dimona (3)	Petah Tikva
21:00	Galván 75'; Exbard 89'	Report	16' Revivo	Stadium: HaMoshava Stadium; Referee: Eli Hacmon

== Eighth Round ==
4 January 2018	Hapoel Petah Tikva (2)	1–2	Hapoel Haifa (1)	Petah Tikva
19:05	Zamir 32'	Report	Gînsari 13'; Maman 51'	Stadium: HaMoshava Stadium

4 January 2018	Hapoel Katamon Jerusalem (2)	1–2	Beitar Kfar Saba (3)	Jerusalem
19:05	Danon 70'	Report	Srur 31'; Niv Sarel 40'	Stadium: Teddy Stadium

4 January 2018	Hapoel Acre (1)	1–0 (a.e.t.)	F.C. Kafr Qasim (3)	Akko
19:05	El Krenawy 115'	Report		Stadium: Akko Municipal Stadium

4 January 2018	Sektzia Nes Tziona (3)	2–0	Bnei Sakhnin (1)	Ness Ziona
19:05	Sahar Levy 3', 45'	Report		Stadium: Ness Ziona Stadium

4 January 2018	Hapoel Ashkelon (1)	1–3 (a.e.t.)	F.C. Ashdod (1)	Ashkelon
19:05	Gavish 39'	Report	Moshel 86'; Cordeiro 115', 120'	Stadium: Sala Stadium

4 January 2018	Hapoel Rishon LeZion (2)	1–2	Beitar Jerusalem (1)	Rishon LeZion
21:00	Omri Shekel 19'	Report	Varenne 25', 42'	Stadium: Haberfeld Stadium

5 January 2018	Hapoel Ramat Gan Givatayim (2)	0–0 (a.e.t.) (3–2 p)	Bnei Yehuda Tel Aviv (1)	Ramat Gan
14:00		Report		Stadium: Ramat Gan Stadium

5 January 2018	Hapoel Marmorek (2)	2–1 (a.e.t.)	Hapoel Kaukab (4)	Ramla
14:00	Mishpati 60'; Mahpud 83', 90'	Report	Nasher Sohib 9'	Stadium: Ramla Municipal Stadium

5 January 2018	Hapoel Hadera (2)	2–2 (a.e.t.) (1–4 p)	Maccabi Netanya (1)	Afula
14:00	Guma 12'; Kadousi 99'	Report	Eden Shrem 59'; Saba 114'	Stadium: Afula Illit Stadium

5 January 2018	Maccabi Petah Tikva (1)	0–0 (a.e.t.) (2–4 p)	Hapoel Kfar Saba (2)	Petah Tikva
14:00		Report		Stadium: HaMoshava Stadium

5 January 2018	Hapoel Ra'anana (1)	3–0	Hapoel Nir Ramat HaSharon (2)	Netanya
14:00	Camara 26'; Hugi 39'; Abuhatzira 53'	Report		Stadium: Netanya Stadium

6 January 2018	Maccabi Tel Aviv (1)	3–0	Bnei M.M.B.E. HaGolan VeHaGalil (4)	Netanya
18:10	Yitzhaki 70'; Schoenfeld 84'; Davidzada 85'	Report		Stadium: Netanya Stadium; Attendance: 4,235; Referee: David Focsman

6 January 2018	Maccabi Ahi Nazareth (2)	1–2	Hapoel Be'er Sheva (1)	Ilut
20:30	Mohammed Khatib 33'	Report	Melamed 70'; Ben Sahar 84'	Stadium: Ilut Stadium; Referee: Ziv Adler

7 January 2018 (Note: The match on 5 January 2018 between Hapoel Shefa-'Amr and Hapoel Bnei Musmus was postponed due to a flooded pitch. The match was later rearranged for 7 January 2018.)	Hapoel Shefa-'Amr (3)	2–1	Hapoel Bnei Musmus (5)	Shefa-'Amr
13:00	Namie Aa'ga 45'; Firas Kortem 59'	Report	Ran Gozlan 90+3'	Stadium: Shefa-'Amr Stadium

7 January 2018	Hapoel Tel Aviv (2)	1–1 (a.e.t.) (3–5 p)	Maccabi Haifa (1)	Petah Tikva
20:30	Ostvind 25' (pen.)	Report	Rukavytsya 11'	Stadium: HaMoshava Stadium; Attendance: 10,500; Referee: Liran Liani
	Penalties
	Agayev (penalty scored); Daniel Gretz (penalty missed); Idan Cohen (penalty scored); Ostvind (penalty scored)		Alberman (penalty scored); Rukavytsya (penalty scored); Caio (penalty scored); Gershon (penalty scored); Athanasiadis (penalty scored)

16 January 2018 (Note: The match on 5 January 2018 between Hapoel Ironi Kiryat Shmona and Hapoel Afula was postponed due to a flooded pitch. The match was later rearranged for 16 January 2018.)	Hapoel Ironi Kiryat Shmona (1)	3–0	Hapoel Afula (2)	Kiryat Shmona
20:00	Lakou 52'; Shamir 54'; Yehezkel 82'	Report		Stadium: Municipal Stadium; Referee: Ido Layba

== Round of 16 ==
23 January 2018	Hapoel Ironi Kiryat Shmona (1)	2–1 (a.e.t.)	Hapoel Shefa-'Amr (3)	Kiryat Shmona
19:05	Abed 75'; Kharib 112' (o.g.)	Report	Thiab 34' (pen.)	Stadium: Kiryat Shmona Municipal Stadium

23 January 2018	Beitar Kfar Saba (3)	1–3	Hapoel Kfar Saba (2)	Kfar Saba
19:05		Report		Stadium: Levita Stadium

23 January 2018	Hapoel Acre (1)	1–2	Hapoel Haifa (1)	Akko
19:05	Azubel 18'	Report	Turgeman 17'; Turgeman 90'	Stadium: Akko Municipal Stadium

23 January 2018	Hapoel Ra'anana (1)	2–0	Sektzia Nes Tziona (3)	Netanya
19:05		Report		Stadium: Netanya Stadium

23 January 2018	Hapoel Ramat Gan Givatayim (2)	0–2	Hapoel Be'er Sheva (1)	Ramat Gan
21:00		Report	Melamed 33'; Nwakaeme 42'	Stadium: Ramat Gan Stadium

24 January 2018	F.C. Ashdod (1)	2–0	Maccabi Netanya (1)	Ashdod
19:00		Report		Stadium: Yud-Alef Stadium

24 January 2018	Maccabi Haifa (1)	3–0	Maccabi Tel Aviv (1)	Haifa
21:00	Kehat 54'; Sallalich 57'; Rukavytsya 76'	Report	Dor Peretz (yellow card) 76'	Stadium: Sammy Ofer Stadium; Attendance: 14,424; Referee: Eli Hacmon

25 January 2018	Beitar Jerusalem (1)	2–1	Hapoel Marmorek (2)	Jerusalem
20:50	Varenne 19'; Varenne 25'	Report	Dyulgerov 32'	Stadium: Teddy Stadium; Attendance: 2,200; Referee: Daniel Bar Natan

== Quarter-finals ==
=== First leg ===
The first legs will take place from 6 to 7 February 2018.

6 February 2018	Hapoel Kfar Saba (2)	0–2	Beitar Jerusalem (1)	Kfar Saba
19:00		Report		Stadium: Levita Stadium

6 February 2018	Maccabi Haifa (1)	2–2	Hapoel Haifa (1)	Haifa
21:00		Report		Stadium: Sammy Ofer Stadium

7 February 2018	F.C. Ashdod (1)	1–1	Hapoel Ra'anana (1)	Ashdod
19:00		Report		Stadium: Yud-Alef Stadium

7 February 2018	Hapoel Be'er Sheva (1)	1–1	Hapoel Ironi Kiryat Shmona (1)	Be'er Sheva
21:00		Report		Stadium: Turner Stadium

=== Second leg ===
The second legs took place from 27 February to 1 March 2018.

27 February 2018	Hapoel Ra'anana (1)	1–1 (a.e.t.) (2–2 agg.) (5–3 p)	F.C. Ashdod (1)	Netanya
19:45	Bručić 67' (o.g.)	Report	5' Bručić	Stadium: Netanya Stadium; Referee: Tzvika Levy

1–1 on aggregate. Hapoel Ra'anana won on Penalty shootout 5–3.

28 February 2018	Hapoel Ironi Kiryat Shmona (1)	1–0 (2–1 agg.)	Hapoel Be'er Sheva (1)	Kiryat Shmona
19:00	Hasselbaink 11'	Report		Stadium: Municipal Stadium

Hapoel Ironi Kiryat Shmona won 2–1 on aggregate.

28 February 2018	Beitar Jerusalem (1)	0–0 (2–0 agg.)	Hapoel Kfar Saba (2)	Jerusalem
21:00		Report		Stadium: Teddy Stadium; Referee: Roi Reinshreiber

Beitar Jerusalem won 2–0 on aggregate.

1 March 2018	Hapoel Haifa (1)	1–1 (3–3 agg.)	Maccabi Haifa (1)	Haifa
20:50	Turgeman 45'	Report	21' Azulay	Stadium: Sammy Ofer Stadium; Attendance: 17,500; Referee: Liran Liany

3–3 on aggregate. Hapoel Haifa won on away goals.

== Semi-finals ==
The two matches will take place from 30 March to 2 April 2018 at the Sammy Ofer Stadium in Haifa.

1 April 2018	Hapoel Haifa	0–0 (a.e.t.) (4–3 p)	Hapoel Ra'anana	Haifa
		Report		Stadium: Sammy Ofer Stadium; Referee: Daniel Bar Natan
	Penalties
	Ben Basat (penalty scored); Turgeman (penalty missed); Plakuschenko (penalty scored); Mitrevski (penalty missed); Tamaș (penalty scored); Malul (penalty scored)		(penalty missed) Swisa; (penalty scored) Nimni; (penalty scored) Camara; (penalty scored) Arshid; (penalty missed) Abuhatzira; (penalty missed) Dasa

1 April 2018	Beitar Jerusalem	3–2	Hapoel Ironi Kiryat Shmona	Haifa
	Sylvestr 53', 79'; Sabo 88' (pen.)	Report	Shaker 31'; Nachmias 90+4'	Stadium: Sammy Ofer Stadium; Referee: Erez Papir

== Final ==
The final was played on 9 May 2018 at the Teddy Stadium in Jerusalem.

9 May 2018

Hapoel Haifa	3–1 (a.e.t.)	Beitar Jerusalem
Plakuschenko 28'; Scheimann 105'; Turgeman 120'	Report	Varenne 29'

Teddy Stadium, Jerusalem
Referee: Liran Liany
