= 2010–11 Toto Cup Leumit =

Toto Cup Leumit
- Season: 2010–11
- Champions: Ironi Ramat HaSharon

The 2010–11 Toto Cup Leumit was the twenty-nine season of the third most important football tournament in Israel since its introduction and seventh under the current format. It held in two stages. First, sixteen Liga Leumit teams were divided into four groups. The winners and runners-up advanced to the Quarterfinals. Quarterfinals, Semifinals and Finals were held as one-legged matches, with the Final played at the Ramat Gan Stadium.

The defending champions were Ironi Kiryat Shmona, making it their second Toto Cup title overall, due to the promotion in the last season the club could not defend their title.

It won on 15 December 2010 by Ironi Ramat HaSharon.

== Group stage ==
The draw took place on June 14, 2010.

The matches were played from 7 August to 28 October 2010.

=== Group A ===
Pos	Team	Pld	W	D	L	GF	GA	GD	Pts	MAN	HNI	MIJ	AHV
1	Maccabi Ahi Nazareth (A)	6	4	1	1	13	3	+10	13		3–0	4–1	3–0
2	Hapoel Nazareth Illit (A)	6	4	0	2	8	6	+2	12	1–0		1–0	0–1
3	Maccabi Ironi Jatt Al-Ahli	6	2	1	3	9	9	0	7	0–0	2–3		3–1
4	Ahva Arraba	6	1	0	5	3	15	−12	3	1–3	0–3	0–3	

Source: football.org.il (in Hebrew)
Rules for classification: 1st points; 2nd goal difference; 3rd matches won; 4th goals scored; 5th head-to-head; 6th decision match
(A) Advanced to the quarterfinals

=== Group B ===
Pos	Team	Pld	W	D	L	GF	GA	GD	Pts	HKS	MHE	HRA	HHE
1	Hapoel Kfar Saba (A)	6	3	1	2	8	6	+2	10		0–3	1–1	0–1
2	Maccabi Herzliya (A)	6	2	3	1	7	5	+2	9	0–2		0–0	1–1
3	Hapoel Ra'anana	6	1	3	2	5	7	−2	6	1–3	1–2		1–0
4	Hapoel Herzliya	6	1	3	2	4	6	−2	6	2–2	1–1	1–1	

Source: football.org.il (in Hebrew)
Rules for classification: 1st points; 2nd goal difference; 3rd matches won; 4th goals scored; 5th head-to-head; 6th decision match
(A) Advanced to the quarterfinals

=== Group C ===
Pos	Team	Pld	W	D	L	GF	GA	GD	Pts	IRH	IBY	BTA	HAR
1	Ironi Nir Ramat HaSharon (A)	6	4	1	1	11	4	+7	13		0–0	1–3	3–1
2	Ironi Bat Yam (A)	6	3	1	2	8	7	+1	10	0–2		4–2	2–0
3	Beitar Shimshon Tel Aviv	6	2	1	3	10	10	0	7	0–1	3–1		0–1
4	Hakoah Amidar Ramat Gan	6	1	1	4	4	12	−8	4	0–1	0–1	2–2	

Source: football.org.il (in Hebrew)
Rules for classification: 1st points; 2nd goal difference; 3rd matches won; 4th goals scored; 5th head-to-head; 6th decision match
(A) Advanced to the quarterfinals

=== Group D ===
Pos	Team	Pld	W	D	L	GF	GA	GD	Pts	SNT	HRL	HBL	MBS
1	Sektzia Nes Tziona (A)	6	4	0	2	7	8	−1	12		2–4	2–1	1–0
2	Hapoel Rishon LeZion (A)	6	3	1	2	15	8	+7	10	0–1		2–3	1–1
4	Hapoel Bnei Lod	6	3	1	2	11	8	+3	10	3–0	0–4		4–0
3	Maccabi Be'er Sheva	6	0	2	4	2	11	−9	2	0–1	1–4	0–0	

Source: football.org.il (in Hebrew)
Rules for classification: 1st points; 2nd goal difference; 3rd matches won; 4th goals scored; 5th head-to-head; 6th decision match
(A) Advanced to the quarterfinals

== Elimination rounds ==
=== Quarterfinals ===
The matches were played on 9 November 2010.

Home team	Score^{1}	Away team
Maccabi Herzliya	1 – 1	Ironi Bat Yam
1 – 1 after extra time – Ironi Bat Yam won 4 – 2 on penalties
Hapoel Rishon LeZion	1 – 4	Hapoel Nazareth Illit
Maccabi Ahi Nazareth	1 – 5	Sektzia Nes Tziona
Ironi Ramat HaSharon	2 – 1	Hapoel Kfar Saba

^{1} Score after 90 minutes

=== Semifinals ===
The matches were played on 30 November 2010.

Home team	Score^{1}	Away team
Sektzia Nes Tziona	1 – 1	Ironi Bat Yam
1 – 1 after extra time – Sektzia Nes Tziona won 3 – 1 on penalties
Hapoel Nazareth Illit	1 – 1	Ironi Ramat HaSharon
Ironi Ramat HaSharon won 1 – 3 after extra time

^{1} Score after 90 minutes

=== Final ===
December 15, 2010
18:00 IST

Ironi Ramat HaSharon	2 – 2 (a.e.t.)	Sektzia Nes Tziona
Nisim 26'; Fliker 37'	Report (in Hebrew)	47', 60' Asayag
Penalties
Halevi (penalty scored); Kozacuks (penalty scored); Peser (penalty scored); Caveda (penalty scored); Nisim (penalty scored)	5 – 3	(penalty scored) Asayag; (penalty missed) Ben Haim; (penalty scored) Azulay; (penalty scored) Tzemach

Ramat Gan Stadium, Ramat Gan
Attendance: 500
Referee: Erez Papir

== See also ==
- 2010–11 Toto Cup Al
- 2010–11 Liga Leumit
- 2010–11 Israel State Cup
