= Al-Muwaylih =

Al-Muwaylih المويْلح
- Village
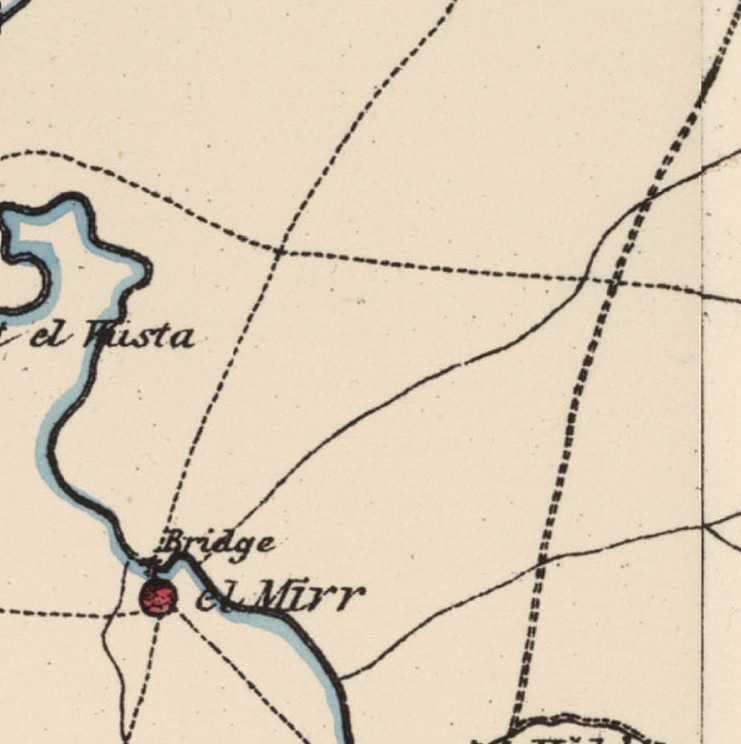
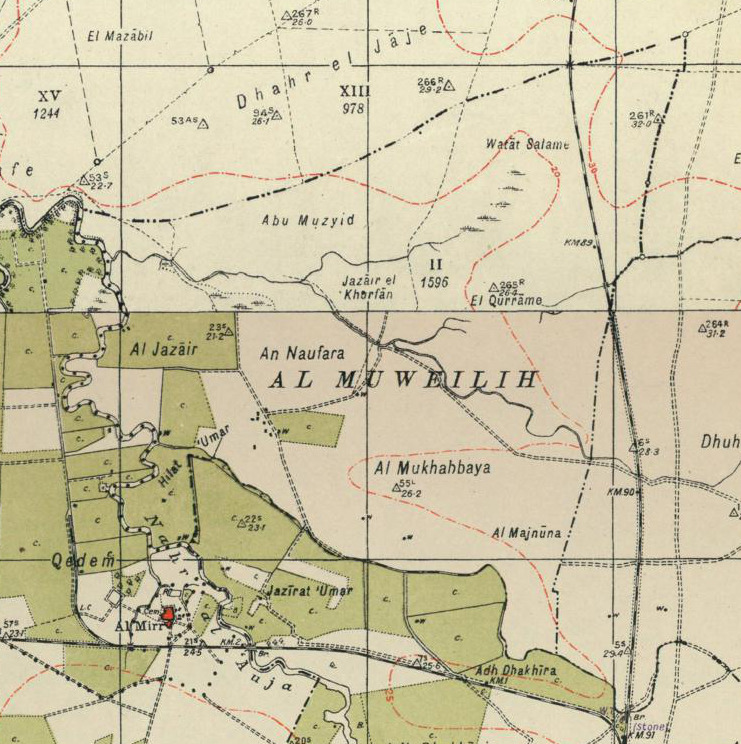
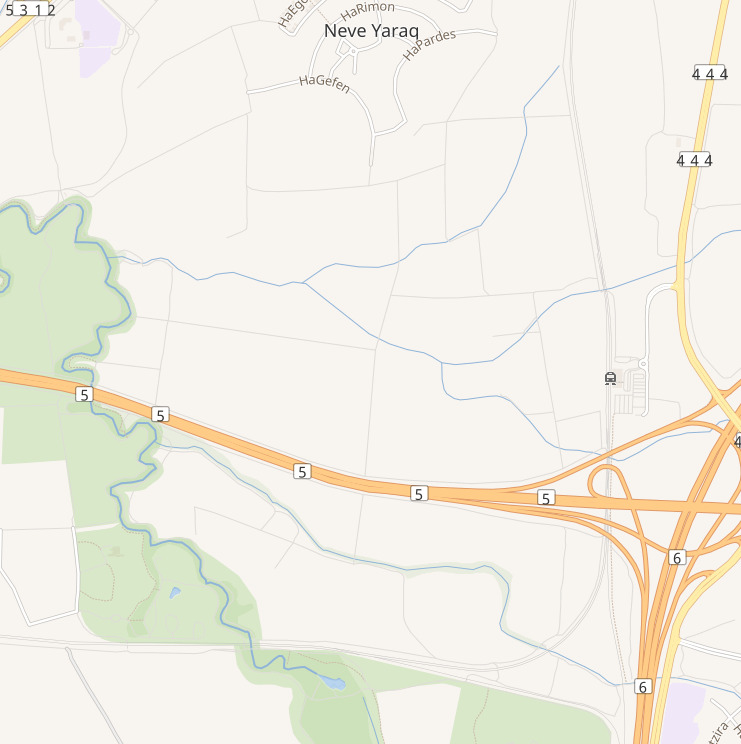
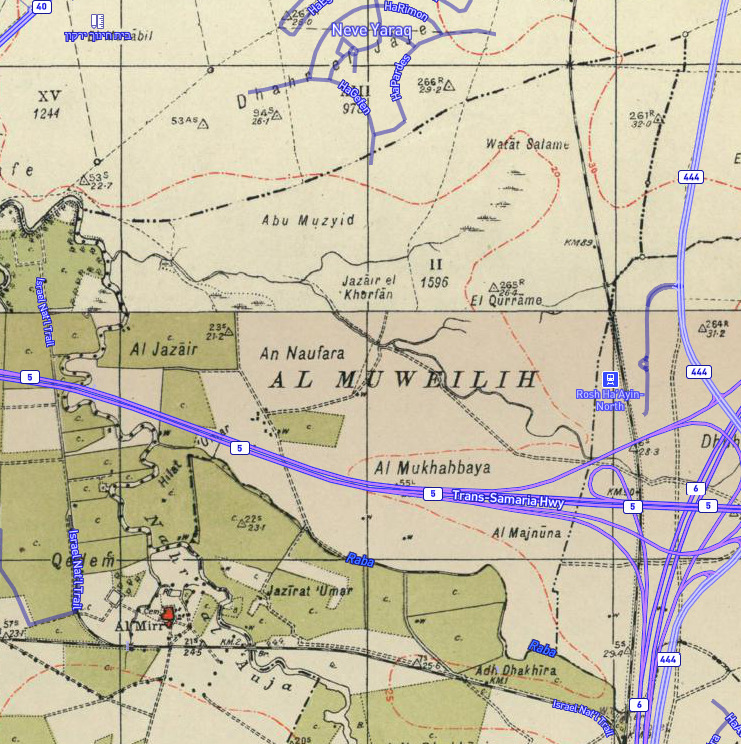
- 1870s map 1940s map modern map 1940s with modern overlay map A series of historical maps of the area around Al-Muwaylih (click the buttons)

- Location within Mandatory Palestine
- Coordinates: 32°07′17″N 34°55′27″E
- Palestine grid: 142/169
- Geopolitical entity: Mandatory Palestine
- Subdistrict: Jaffa

Area
  - Total: 3,342 dunams (3.342 km^{2}; 1.290 sq mi)

Population (1945)
  - Total: 360
- Current Localities: Neve Yarak

Al-Muwaylih (Arabic: المويْلح, El Muweilih) was a Palestinian village in the Jaffa Subdistrict. It was depopulated during the 1948 Palestine War.

== History ==
=== British Mandate era ===
In the 1931 census of Palestine, conducted by the British Mandate authorities Malalha had 37 Muslim inhabitants.

In the 1945 statistics the population numbered 360 Muslims, who had a total of 3,342 dunams of land. Of this, 949 dunums were planted with citrus and bananas, 27 dunums were plantations and irrigable land, 1,796 were for cereals, while a total of 194 dunams were classified as non-cultivable areas.

=== 1948, aftermath ===
Neve Yarak is located, partly on Al-Muwaylih land, and partly on land formerly belonging to Jaljuliya.

By 1992, it was described: "The site is very difficult to identify. Some of the houses still stand, deserted, amidst wild vegetation. One of them belonged to Hashim al-Jayyusi, who later became a Jordanian cabinet minister. It is a two-storey, concrete structure with rectangular doors and windows and a stairway in front that leads to the second storey. The other villas have been reduced to rubble. The land in the area is cultivated."

== Bibliography ==
- Government of Palestine, Department of Statistics (1945). Village Statistics, April, 1945.
- Hadawi, S. (1970). Village Statistics of 1945: A Classification of Land and Area ownership in Palestine. Palestine Liberation Organization Research Center. Archived from the original on 2018-12-08.
- Khalidi, W. (1992). All That Remains: The Palestinian Villages Occupied and Depopulated by Israel in 1948. Washington D.C.: Institute for Palestine Studies. ISBN 0-88728-224-5.
- Mills, E., ed. (1932). Census of Palestine 1931. Population of Villages, Towns and Administrative Areas. Jerusalem: Government of Palestine.
