= 2010–11 Liga Leumit =

Liga Leumit
- Season: 2010–11
- Champions: Ironi Ramat HaSharon
- Promoted: Ironi Ramat HaSharon; Hapoel Rishon LeZion
- Relegated: Maccabi Ironi Jatt; Ahva Arraba
- Matches played: 276
- Goals scored: 638 (2.31 per match)
- Top goalscorer: Oren Nissim (18)

The 2010–11 Liga Leumit was the twelfth season since its introduction in 1999 and the 69th season of second-tier football in Israel. It began on 21 August 2010 and ended on 20 May 2011.

A total of sixteen teams contested the league, including twelve sides from the 2009–10 season, two promoted teams from the 2009–10 Liga Alef and two relegated teams from the 2009–10 Israeli Premier League.

== Changes from 2009–10 season ==
Location of teams in the 2010–11 Liga Leumit

=== Team changes ===
Ironi Kiryat Shmona and Hapoel Ashkelon were directly promoted to the 2010–11 Israeli Premier League after finishing the 2009–10 season in the two top places.

Maccabi Ahi Nazareth and Hapoel Ra'anana were directly relegated to the 2010–11 Liga Leumit after finishing the 2009–10 season in the bottom two places.

== Overview ==
=== Stadia and locations ===
Club	Stadium	Capacity
Ahva Arraba	Doha Stadium	8,500
Beitar Shimshon Tel Aviv	Hatikva Neighborhood Stadium	6,500
Hakoah Amidar Ramat Gan	Winter Stadium	8,000
Hapoel Bnei Lod	Lod Municipal Stadium	2,000
Hapoel Herzliya	Herzliya Municipal Stadium	8,100
Hapoel Kfar Saba	Levita Stadium	5,800
Hapoel Nazareth Illit	Green Stadium	4,000
Hapoel Ra'anana	Levita Stadium	5,800^{[A]}
Hapoel Rishon LeZion	Haberfeld Stadium	6,000
Ironi Bat Yam	Bat Yam Municipal Stadium	3,100
Ironi Ramat HaSharon	Grundman Stadium	2,200
Maccabi Ahi Nazareth	Ilut Stadium	4,932
Maccabi Be'er Sheva	Vasermil Stadium	13,000
Maccabi Herzliya	Herzliya Municipal Stadium	8,100
Maccabi Ironi Jatt	Ilut Stadium	4,932^{[A]}
Sektzia Nes Tziona	Ness Ziona Stadium	3,500

^A The club played their home games at a neutral venue because their own ground did not meet Premier League requirements.

== Regular season ==
=== Regular season table ===
Pos	Team	Pld	W	D	L	GF	GA	GD	Pts	Qualification
1	Hapoel Kfar Saba	30	20	6	4	49	27	+22	66	Top Playoff
2	Ironi Nir Ramat HaSharon	30	17	9	4	48	24	+24	60	Top Playoff
3	Maccabi Herzliya	30	15	8	7	33	15	+18	53	Top Playoff
4	Hapoel Rishon LeZion	30	15	7	8	49	26	+23	52	Top Playoff
5	Hapoel Ra'anana	30	12	10	8	35	21	+14	46	Top Playoff
6	Sektzia Nes Tziona	30	12	10	8	27	19	+8	46	Top Playoff
7	Hapoel Herzliya	30	13	7	10	41	34	+7	46	Middle Playoff
8	Hapoel Bnei Lod	30	11	12	7	33	26	+7	45	Middle Playoff
9	Beitar Shimshon Tel Aviv	30	9	7	14	40	42	−2	34	Middle Playoff
10	Maccabi Ahi Nazareth	30	11	9	10	41	37	+4	33 (Note: Maccabi Ahi Nazareth were deducted nine for entering administration.)	Middle Playoff
11	Maccabi Be'er Sheva	30	7	11	12	29	38	−9	32	Bottom Playoff
12	Ironi Bat Yam	30	5	14	11	23	36	−13	29	Bottom Playoff
13	Hakoah Amidar Ramat Gan	30	5	9	16	28	48	−20	24	Bottom Playoff
14	Hapoel Nazareth Illit	30	9	5	16	31	43	−12	23 (Note: Hapoel Nazareth Illit were docked nine points for entering administration.)	Bottom Playoff
15	Maccabi Ironi Jatt Al-Ahli	30	3	10	17	22	59	−37	19	Bottom Playoff
16	Ahva Arraba	30	5	8	17	19	53	−34	13 (Note: Ahva Arraba were docked one point due to double contracts with players and staff in the previous year and nine points for entering administration.)	Bottom Playoff

Source: Israel Football Association
Rules for classification: 1st points; 2nd goal difference; 3rd matches won; 4th goals scored; 5th head-to-head; 6th decision match

=== Regular season results ===
Home \ Away	AHV	BTA	HAR	HBL	HHE	HKS	HNI	HRA	HRL	IBY	IRH	MAN	MBS	MHE	MIJ	SNT
Ahva Arraba		0–4	3–2	1–2	1–1	0–0	1–1	0–2	0–4	3–2	1–3	0–2	1–1	0–3	1–0	0–1
Beitar Shimshon Tel Aviv	4–0		1–3	0–4	2–2	1–2	4–0	0–0	2–5	1–2	1–2	0–1	2–2	0–2	3–2	2–0
Hakoah Amidar Ramat Gan	1–2	0–2		0–0	1–2	0–0	3–0	0–1	1–6	0–0	1–3	0–4	2–0	0–0	1–1	1–1
Hapoel Bnei Lod	1–0	1–1	2–1		0–3	0–1	3–1	2–1	0–0	0–1	0–2	2–1	1–2	0–0	2–0	0–0
Hapoel Herzliya	1–0	1–0	4–0	1–3		1–3	1–0	0–0	3–2	1–1	1–3	4–1	0–0	1–0	0–2	0–1
Hapoel Kfar Saba	3–1	2–1	3–1	1–1	3–1		2–1	1–2	2–1	0–1	3–2	0–0	1–0	1–0	3–0	2–1
Hapoel Nazareth Illit	1–2	0–1	3–2	4–1	1–0	0–2		1–0	0–2	1–0	0–1	3–0	4–0	0–2	1–2	0–1
Hapoel Ra'anana	6–0	0–2	1–1	1–2	0–2	2–2	0–0		2–0	2–0	1–0	4–0	2–1	0–1	0–0	0–0
Hapoel Rishon LeZion	0–0	2–0	1–0	1–1	3–1	1–2	0–0	3–0		2–0	2–3	2–0	0–0	1–0	2–1	0–1
Ironi Bat Yam	1–0	1–1	2–2	3–1	1–2	0–3	1–2	0–2	2–0		1–1	1–5	0–0	0–0	0–0	0–2
Ironi Nir Ramat HaSharon	1–1	1–1	1–0	0–0	1–0	4–0	2–1	1–1	0–0	1–1		1–1	3–0	0–4	5–1	2–0
Maccabi Ahi Nazareth	2–0	0–0	2–0	1–1	1–2	2–2	3–1	0–3	0–0	1–1	1–1		2–1	0–2	5–0	2–1
Maccabi Be'er Sheva	1–0	2–1	1–1	0–0	0–3	2–0	2–2	1–2	0–2	0–0	2–1	1–1		1–2	4–0	1–1
Maccabi Herzliya	3–1	2–0	0–1	0–0	1–0	0–1	0–2	0–0	2–0	1–1	0–1	2–1	1–0		1–1	1–1
Maccabi Ironi Jatt Al-Ahli	0–0	1–3	1–0	0–3	0–0	1–3	1–1	0–0	2–6	0–0	0–1	1–2	2–4	1–2		0–0
Sektzia Nes Tziona	0–0	2–0	2–1	0–0	1–1	0–1	3–0	0–1	2–0	0–0	0–3	1–0	1–0	0–1	4–0	

Source: Israel Football Association
Legend: Blue = home team win; Yellow = draw; Red = away team win.

== Playoffs ==
Key numbers for pairing determination (number marks position after 30 games):

Rounds
31st	32nd	33rd	34th	35th
1 – 6; 2 – 5; 3 – 4	1 – 2; 5 – 3; 6 – 4	2 – 6; 3 – 1; 4 – 5	1 – 4; 2 – 3; 6 – 5	3 – 6; 4 – 2; 5 – 1
7 – 10; 8 – 9	7 – 8; 10 – 9	8 – 10; 9 – 7		
11 – 16; 12 – 15; 13 – 14	11 – 12; 15 – 13; 16 – 14	12 – 16; 13 – 11; 14 – 15	11 – 14; 12 – 13; 16 – 15	13 – 16; 14 – 12; 15 – 11

=== Top playoff ===
The points obtained during the regular season were halved (and rounded up) before the start of the playoff. Thus, Hapoel Kfar Saba started with 33 points, Ironi Ramat HaSharon with 30, Maccabi Herzliya with 27, Hapoel Rishon LeZion with 26, Hapoel Ra'anana with 23 and Sektzia Nes Tziona started with 23.

==== Top playoff table ====
Pos	Team	Pld	W	D	L	GF	GA	GD	Pts	Promotion or qualification
1	Ironi Nir Ramat HaSharon (C, P)	35	19	11	5	55	28	+27	38	Promotion to Israeli Premier League
2	Hapoel Rishon LeZion (P)	35	18	8	9	57	31	+26	36	Promotion to Israeli Premier League
3	Hapoel Kfar Saba	35	20	9	6	54	36	+18	36	Qualification for promotion play-offs
4	Maccabi Herzliya	35	17	10	8	41	21	+20	35	
5	Hapoel Ra'anana	35	14	11	10	43	27	+16	30	
6	Sektzia Nes Tziona	35	13	11	11	31	29	+2	27	

Source: Israel Football Association
Rules for classification: 1st points; 2nd goal difference; 3rd matches won; 4th goals scored; 5th head-to-head; 6th decision match
(C) Champions; (P) Promoted

==== Top playoff results ====
Home \ Away	HKS	HRA	HRL	IRH	MHE	SNT
Hapoel Kfar Saba			0–3	0–0		2–3
Hapoel Ra'anana	1–1				1–3	
Hapoel Rishon LeZion		1–4		2–1		
Ironi Nir Ramat HaSharon		1–0			1–1	4–1
Maccabi Herzliya	2–2		0–2			2–0
Sektzia Nes Tziona		0–2	0–0			

Source: Israel Football Association
Legend: Blue = home team win; Yellow = draw; Red = away team win.

=== Middle playoff ===
The points obtained during the regular season were halved (and rounded up) before the start of the playoff. Thus, Hapoel Herzliya started with 23 points, Hapoel Bnei Lod with 23, Maccabi Ahi Nazareth with 17 and Beitar Shimshon Tel Aviv started with 17.

==== Middle playoff table ====
Pos	Team	Pld	W	D	L	GF	GA	GD	Pts
7	Hapoel Herzliya	33	15	8	10	46	37	+9	30
8	Hapoel Bnei Lod	33	11	13	9	36	31	+5	24
9	Maccabi Ahi Nazareth	33	12	11	10	46	41	+5	22
10	Beitar Shimshon Tel Aviv	33	9	9	15	44	47	−3	19

Source: Israel Football Association
Rules for classification: 1st points; 2nd goal difference; 3rd matches won; 4th goals scored; 5th head-to-head; 6th decision match

==== Middle playoff results ====
Home \ Away	BTA	HBL	HHE	MAN
Beitar Shimshon Tel Aviv			2–3	
Hapoel Bnei Lod	1–1			2–3
Hapoel Herzliya		1–0		1–1
Maccabi Ahi Nazareth	1–1			

Source: Israel Football Association
Legend: Blue = home team win; Yellow = draw; Red = away team win.

=== Bottom playoff ===
The points obtained during the regular season were halved (and rounded up) before the start of the playoff. Thus, Maccabi Be'er Sheva started with 16 points, Ironi Bat Yam with 15, Hapoel Nazareth Illit with 12, Hakoah Ramat Gan with 12, Maccabi Ironi Jatt with 10 and Ahva Arraba started with 7.

==== Bottom playoff table ====
Pos	Team	Pld	W	D	L	GF	GA	GD	Pts	Qualification or relegation
11	Hapoel Nazareth Illit	35	12	7	16	43	46	−3	23	
12	Maccabi Be'er Sheva	35	8	14	13	33	42	−9	22	
13	Ironi Bat Yam	35	7	15	13	29	44	−15	22	
14	Hakoah Amidar Ramat Gan (O)	35	7	12	16	32	50	−18	21	Qualification for relegation play-offs
15	Maccabi Ironi Jatt Al-Ahli (R)	35	4	11	20	27	66	−39	14	Relegation to Liga Alef
16	Ahva Arraba (R)	35	6	8	21	21	62	−41	10	Relegation to Liga Alef

Source: Israel Football Association
Rules for classification: 1st points; 2nd goal difference; 3rd matches won; 4th goals scored; 5th head-to-head; 6th decision match
(O) Play-off winners; (R) Relegated

==== Bottom playoff results ====
Home \ Away	AHV	HAR	HNI	IBY	MIJ	MBS
Ahva Arraba			0–3		1–0	
Hakoah Amidar Ramat Gan	2–1		1–1			0–0
Hapoel Nazareth Illit				5–1	3–1	
Ironi Bat Yam	2–0	0–1			2–1	
Maccabi Ironi Jatt Al-Ahli	0–0					3–1
Maccabi Be'er Sheva	2–0		0–0	1–1		

Source: Israel Football Association
Legend: Blue = home team win; Yellow = draw; Red = away team win.

== Promotion and Relegation playoff ==
=== Promotion playoff ===
The 3rd-placed Hapoel Kfar Saba faced the 14th-placed Israeli Premier League team Hapoel Petah Tikva. Hapoel Petah Tikva, the winner on aggregate earned a spot in the 2011–12 Israeli Premier League. The matches took place on May 24 and 27, 2011.

24 May 2011
19:00 UTC+3

Hapoel Petah Tikva	4 – 1	Hapoel Kfar Saba
Luzon 7', 31'; Exbard 22'; Tzarfati 52'	Report	86' Abu Arar

Ramat Gan Stadium, Ramat Gan
Referee: Asaf Kenan

27 May 2011
17:00 UTC+3

Hapoel Kfar Saba	0 – 1	Hapoel Petah Tikva
	Report	9' Turgeman

Levita Stadium, Kfar Saba
Referee: Roi Reinshreiber

Hapoel Petah Tikva won 5–1 on aggregate.

=== Relegation playoff ===
The 14th-placed Hakoah Ramat Gan faced the 3rd-placed Liga Alef team Maccabi Kabilio Jaffa. Hakoah Ramat Gan, the winner on aggregate earned a spot in the 2011–12 Liga Leumit. The matches took place on May 26 and 31, 2011.

26 May 2011
17:00 UTC+3

Maccabi Kabilio Jaffa	1 – 2	Hakoah Ramat Gan
Malka 83'	Report	4' Shmaya; 25' Saloniki

New Holon Stadium, Holon
Referee: Eitan Shmuelevich

31 May 2011
19:45 UTC+3

Hakoah Ramat Gan	1 – 1	Maccabi Kabilio Jaffa
Reps 2'	Report	90+5' Hatari

Winter Stadium, Ramat Gan
Referee: Ziv Adler

Hakoah Ramat Gan won 3–2 on aggregate.

== Top scorers ==
Rank	Scorer	Club	Goals
1	(Israel) Oren Nissim	Ironi Ramat HaSharon	18
2	(Israel) Murad Abu Anza^{1}	Hapoel Bnei Lod	15
3	(Israel) Sharon Gormanzo	Beitar Shimshon Tel Aviv	14
3	(Argentina) David Gomez	Hapoel Rishon LeZion	14
5	(Democratic Republic of the Congo) Alain Masudi	Maccabi Herzliya	13
6	(Israel) Enon Barda	Maccabi Be'er Sheva / Hapoel Rishon LeZion	11
6	(Zambia) Rodgers Kola	Hapoel Rishon LeZion	11
8	(Israel) Moshe Abutbul	Ironi Bat Yam / Ironi Ramat HaSharon	10
9	(Israel) Raz Cohen	Hapoel Ra'anana	9
9	(Israel) Yossi Janah	Maccabi Ironi Jatt	9
9	(Israel) Ran Itzhak	Hapoel Rishon LeZion	9
9	(Israel) Moti Malka	Hapoel Nazareth Illit	9
9	(Brazil) Guilherme Weisheimer	Ahva Arraba / Maccabi Herzliya	9
9	(Israel) Fody Mohamed	Hapoel Ra'anana	9
9	(Israel) Patrick Doeplah^{2}	Hapoel Kfar Saba	9
Total			638
Average per game			2.31

Source: Israel Football Association
- ^1 Murad Abu Anza was transferred to Maccabi Petah Tikva during the winter transfer window.
- ^2 Patrick Doeplah died on 22 March 2011.

== Season statistics ==
=== Scoring ===
- First goal of the season: Dor Elkabetz for Sektzia Nes Tziona against Ironi Bat Yam, 62nd minute (20 August 2010)
- Widest winning margin: 6 goals – Hapoel Ra'anana 6–0 Ahva Arraba (30 August 2010)
- Most goals in a match: 7 goals – Hakoah Ramat Gan 1–6 Hapoel Rishon LeZion (13 September 2010)

=== Discipline ===
- First yellow card of the season: Yonatan Revivo for Ironi Bat Yam against Sektzia Nes Tziona, 13th minute (20 August 2010)
- First red card of the season: Yonatan Revivo for Ironi Bat Yam against Sektzia Nes Tziona, 60th minute (20 August 2010)

== See also ==
- 2010–11 Israel State Cup
- 2010–11 Toto Cup Leumit
