= Neve Yarak =

Moshav in central Israel

Neve Yarak: נווה ירק (Hebrew)
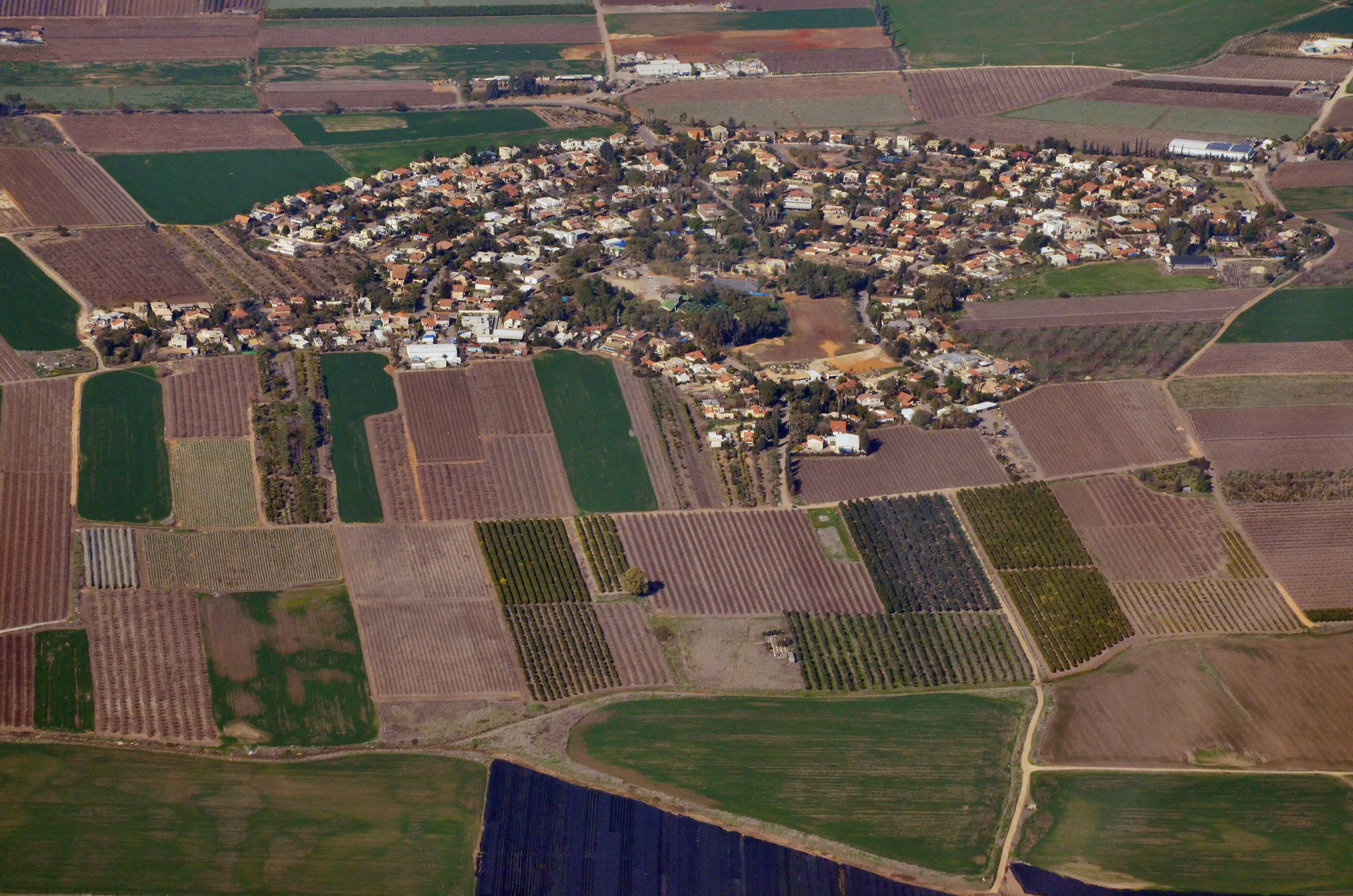

- Location within Central Israel Location within Israel
- Coordinates: 32°7′56″N 34°55′28″E
- Country: Israel
- District: Central
- Subdistrict: Petah Tikva
- Council: Drom HaSharon
- Affiliation: Moshavim Movement
- Founded: 1951
- Founder: Romanian immigrants
- Population (2024): 1,210

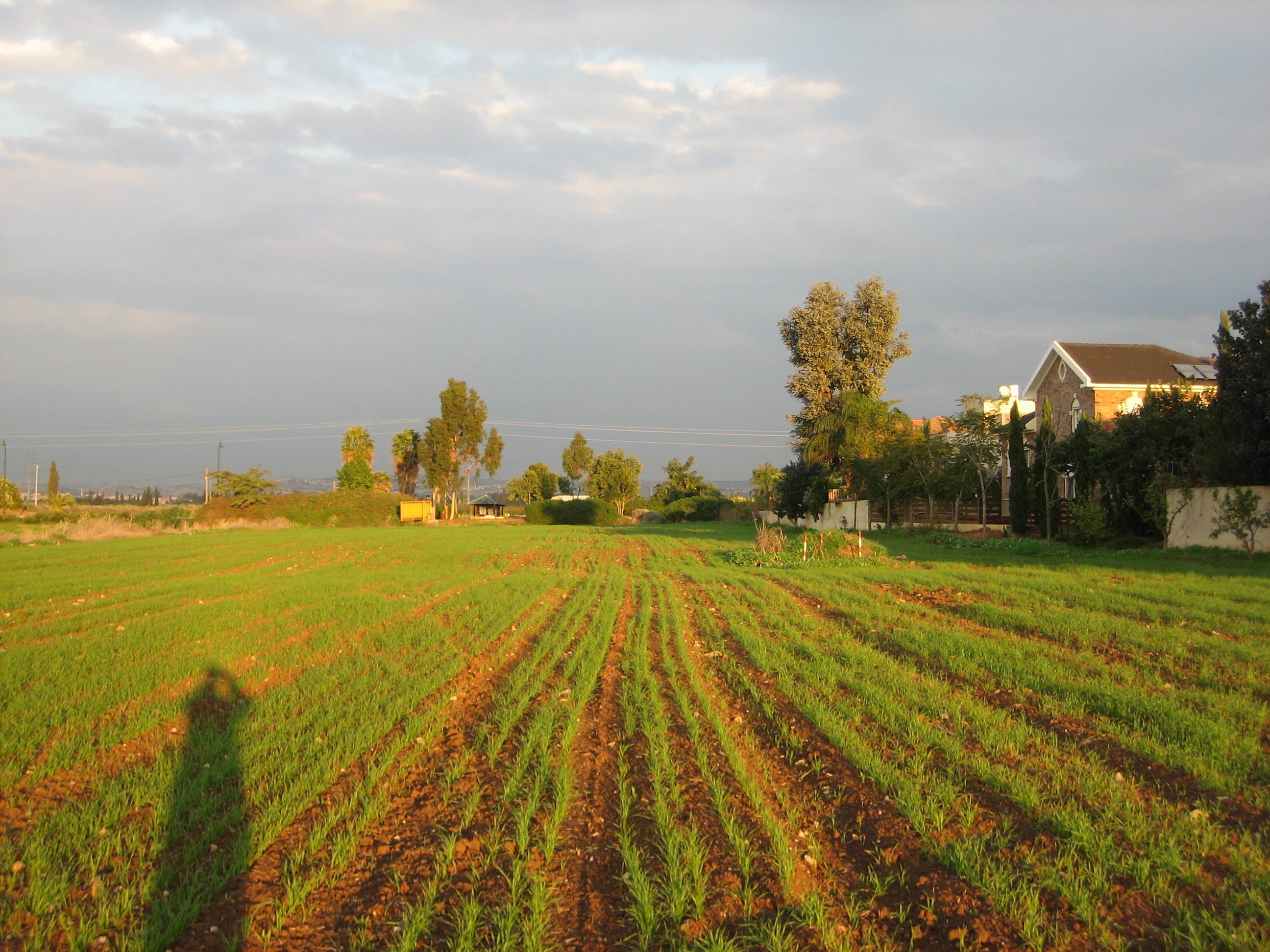
Neve Yarak fields

Neve Yarak (Hebrew: נְוֵה יָרָק) is a moshav in central Israel. Located near Hod HaSharon, it falls under the jurisdiction of Drom HaSharon Regional Council. In 2024, it had a population of 1,210.

== History ==
The moshav was formed in 1951 by immigrants from Romania, and was initially called Kfar Yarkanim (Hebrew: כפר ירקנים, lit. 'Greengrocer Village').

It is located partly on land located near the Palestinian village of al-Muwaylih prior to its depopulation in the 1948 Arab–Israeli War. It is also located near the Arab town of Jaljuliya.

Neve Yarak Winery was founded in 2015. The wine produced here is exclusively from Carignan grapes planted many decades ago, but had not been used to make wine until recently.
