= Abbas Zakour =

Arab-Israeli politician

- عباس زكور
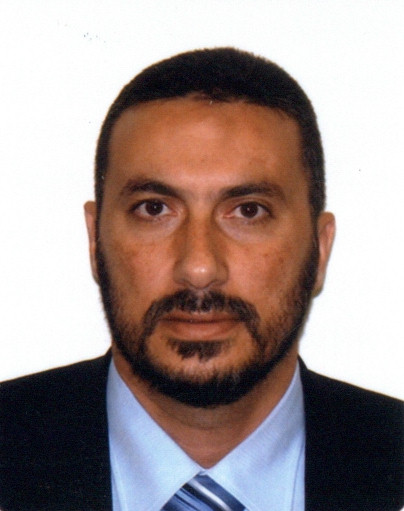
- Zakour during his time in the Knesset

Faction represented in the Knesset
- 2006–2009: United Arab List

Personal details
- Born: 30 December 1965 (age 60) Acre, Israel

Abbas Zakour (Arabic: عباس زكور, Hebrew: עבאס זכור; born 30 December 1965) is an Israeli Arab politician and a former member of the Knesset for the United Arab List.

== Biography ==
Born in Acre, Zakour gained a BA in Islamic Sciences at the Al-Quds University in 1990. He later worked as director of the Almotak newspaper.

For the 2006 Knesset elections, he was placed fourth on the United Arab List list, and became a Knesset member when the party won four seats. In December 2008, he left the UAL and established a new party, the Arab Centre Party, to run in the 2009 Knesset elections. Zakour stated that the party would join "any leftist government that supports peace", and hopes to win four seats. Labor Party MK Raleb Majadele was asked to head the party, but turned the offer down. It was planned that Zakour would head the list, whilst former United Arab List and Arab National Party MK Muhamad Kanan would take second spot. However, Zakour later joined Balad, winning fourth place on its list, and the new party did not run. Balad won three seats in the election, meaning Zakour lost his place in the Knesset.

In 2006 Zakour was stabbed and lightly wounded by a gang of Russian immigrants shouting anti-Arab chants. The attack was part of a "stabbing rampage", and was described as a "hate crime".
