= Al-Salam Stadium =

Al-Salam Stadium may refer to:

- Al Salam Stadium (Egypt)
- Al-Salam Stadium, Umm al-Fahm, or HaShalom Stadium, Israel
