= Moshe Abutbul =

Moshe Abutbul may refer to:

- Moshe Abutbul (footballer) (born 1984), Israeli association football player
- Moshe Abutbul (politician) (born 1965), Israeli politician
