= Oren Nissim =

Israeli footballer

Oren Nissim אורן ניסים
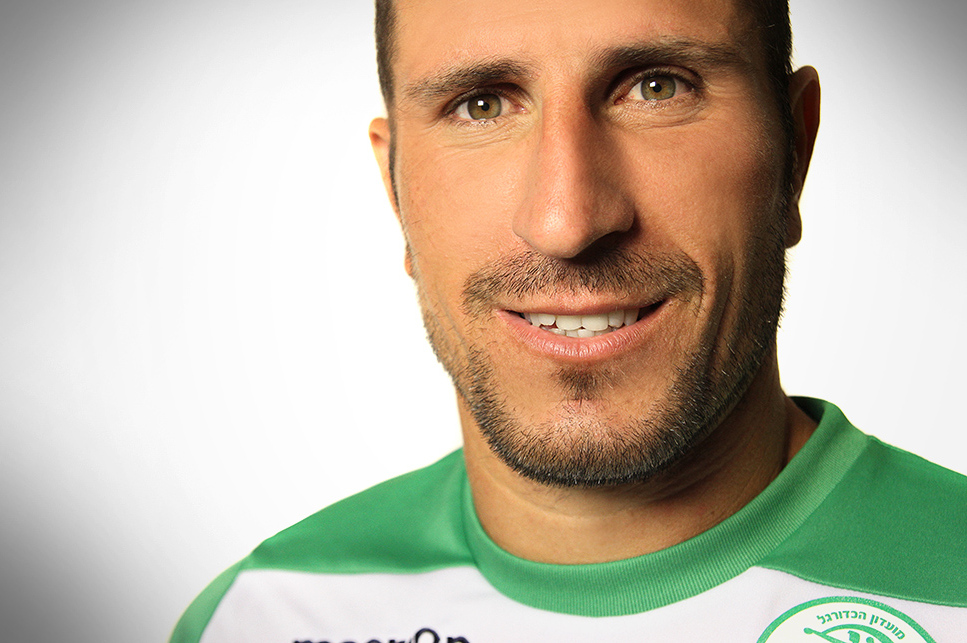

Personal information
- Full name: Oren Nissim
- Date of birth: November 4, 1976 (age 49)
- Place of birth: Holon, Israel
- Position: Striker

Youth career
- Hapoel Tzafririm Holon

Senior career*
Years	Team	Apps	(Gls)
1996–1998	Hapoel Tzafririm Holon	68	(8)
1998–2002	Hapoel Haifa	115	(25)
2002–2003	Bnei Yehuda	11	(3)
2003–2004	F.C. Ashdod	16	(3)
2003–2004	→ Maccabi Ahi Nazareth (loan)	16	(3)
2004–2005	Maccabi Netanya	30	(15)
2005–2007	Hapoel Kfar Saba	41	(5)
2007–2009	Hapoel Be'er Sheva	28	(4)
2009–2012	Ironi Nir Ramat HaSharon	67	(29)
2012	Hapoel Ramat Gan	16	(4)
2012–2013	Maccabi Yavne	41	(13)
2013–2015	Hapoel Kfar Saba	47	(13)
2016	F.C. Holon	9	(2)
Total		505	(127)
- * Club domestic league appearances and goals as of 1 January 2016

Oren Nisim (Hebrew: אורן ניסים; born 4 November 1976) is a retired Israeli footballer. Nissim is mostly known for being a part of Hapoel Haifa when they won their first and only Israeli league championship in 1999. Nissim was known for his strength and height, which helped him score many goals.

He is of a Tunisian-Jewish descent.

== Honours ==
- Israeli Premier League (1):
  - 1998–99
- Toto Cup (1):
  - 2000–01
- Toto Cup (Leumit) (3):
  - 2004–05, 2008–09, 2010
- Liga Leumit (2):
  - 2010-11, 2011–12
- Liga Leumit - Top Goalscorer:
  - 2004-05 (15 goals), 2010-11 (18 goals)
- Liga Alef (1):
  - 2013-14
