= Muhamad Kanan =

Arab-Israeli politician

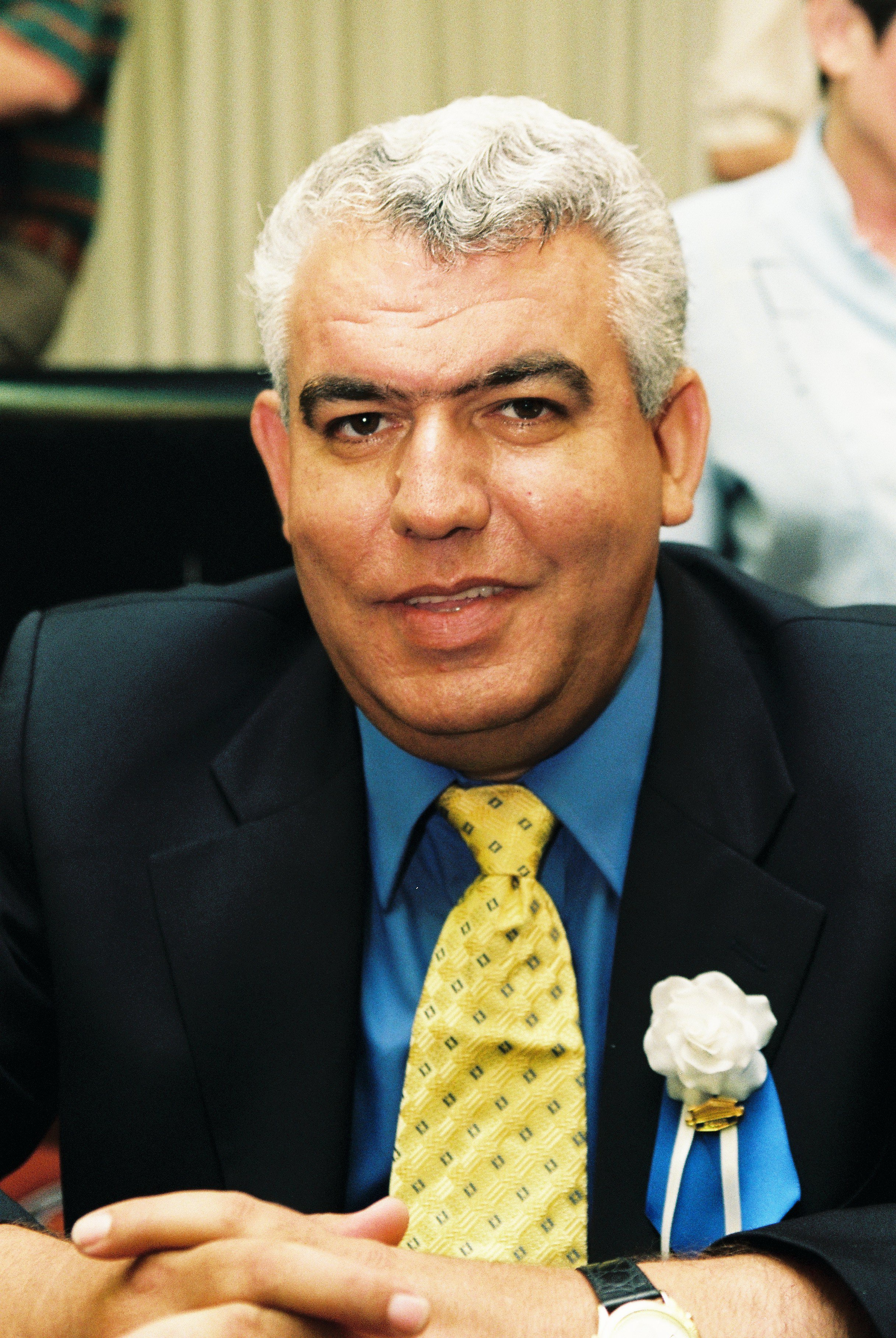
- Kanan in 1999

Faction represented in the Knesset
- 1999–2001: United Arab List
- 2001–2003: Arab National Party

Personal details
- Born: 17 October 1955 (age 70) Tamra, Israel

Muhamad Kanan (Arabic: محمّد كنعان, Hebrew: מוחמד כנעאן; born 17 October 1955) is an Israeli Arab politician who served as a member of the Knesset for the United Arab List and the Arab National Party between 1999 and 2003.

== Biography ==
Born in Tamra, Kanan gained a BA at the Ben-Gurion University of the Negev, before studying community centre management at the Hebrew University of Jerusalem and then working as a high school teacher. Between 1980 and 1988 he served as deputy mayor of his hometown, and chaired the management council of the town's community centre between 1981 and 1989.

He was elected to the Knesset on the United Arab List list in the 1999 elections, but on 19 February 2001, left the party to establish the Arab National Party along with Tawfik Khatib. The new party did not participate in the 2003 elections, and both lost their seats.

In the run-up to the 2006 elections it looked like Kanan would join Hadash. However, the party then entered the election race, before withdrawing and announcing its support for Balad, though by then it was too late to take the party's name off the ballot. On election day the party picked up only 738 votes (0.02%), the second lowest in total and far below the electoral threshold of 2%.

In December 2008, Kanan joined the new Arab Centre Party, and was given second place on its Knesset list.
