= Shadi Abu Dib =

Israeli footballer

Personal information
- Date of birth: 14 November 1975 (age 50)
- Place of birth: Jaljulia, Israel
- Height: 1.75 m (5 ft 9 in)
- Position: Midfielder

Youth career
- Hapoel Petah Tikva

Senior career*
Years	Team	Apps	(Gls)
1996–1997	Hapoel Taibe	24	(0)
1997–1998	Ironi Rishon LeZion	8	(0)
1998–1999	Śląsk Wrocław	7	(0)
1999–2000	Hapoel Jerusalem	12	(0)
2000–2001	Maccabi Ahi Nazareth	25	(1)
2003–2004	Tzafririm Holon	15	(1)
2004–2005	A.S. Eilat	2	(0)
2005	Hapoel Jaljulia		
2005	Szczakowianka Jaworzno	2	(0)
2006	Pogoń Świebodzin		

Managerial career
- F.C. Kafr Qasim Nibrass
- * Club domestic league appearances and goals

Shadi Abu Dib (Arabic: شادي أبو ديب, Hebrew: שאדי אבו דיב; born 14 November 1975) is an Israeli former professional footballer who played as a midfielder.

After retirement, Abu Dib coached youth teams and took on his first senior team in 2015, when he began coaching F.C. Kafr Qasim Nibrass.
