= Tawfik Khatib =

Israeli politician (born 1954)

- توفيق خطيب
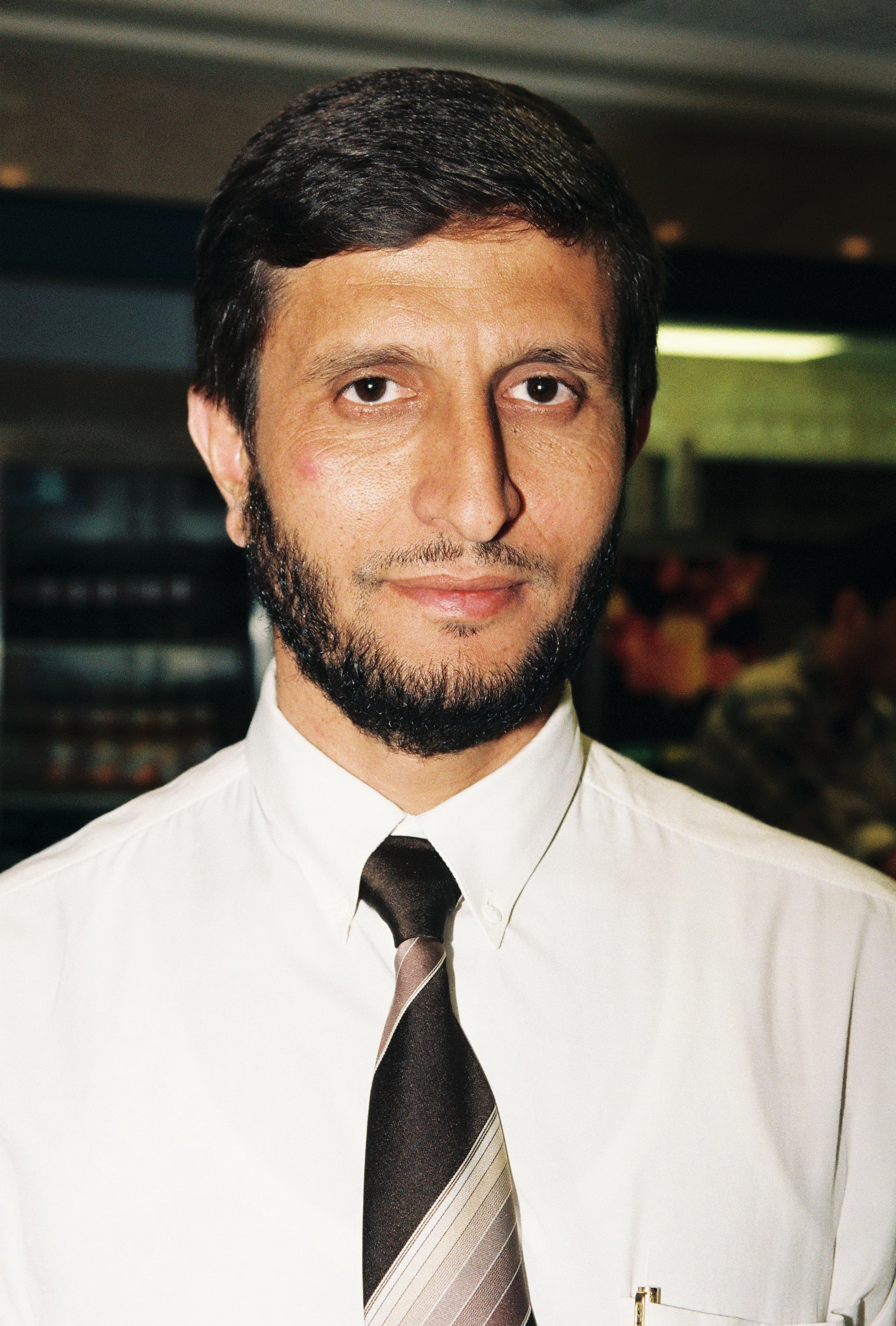
- Khatib in 1996

Faction represented in the Knesset
- 1996–2001: United Arab List
- 2001–2003: Arab National Party

Personal details
- Born: 21 April 1954 (age 71) Jaljulia, Israel

Tawfik Khatib (Arabic: توفيق خطيب, Hebrew: תאופיק ח'טיב; born 21 April 1954) is an Israeli Arab former politician who served as a member of the Knesset for the United Arab List and the Arab National Party between 1996 and 2003.

== Biography ==
Born in Jaljulia, Khatib studied political science at Bar-Ilan University, gaining a BA. He went on to study Islamic culture, writing his MA thesis on ancient taxation.

In 1989 he became head of Jaljulia's local council. A member of the Islamic Movement, He was elected to the Knesset on the United Arab List list in the 1996 elections. After winning fifth place on the party's list for the 1999 elections he retained his seat, but on 19 February 2001, left the party to establish the Arab National Party along with Muhamad Kanan. Prior to the 2003 elections media reports suggested that Khatib would join Meretz, but nothing came of them, and he lost his seat.

Khatib is married with five children. He currently teaches Arabic at Beit Berl College.
