= Mustafa Murrar =

Palestinian author (1929–2021)

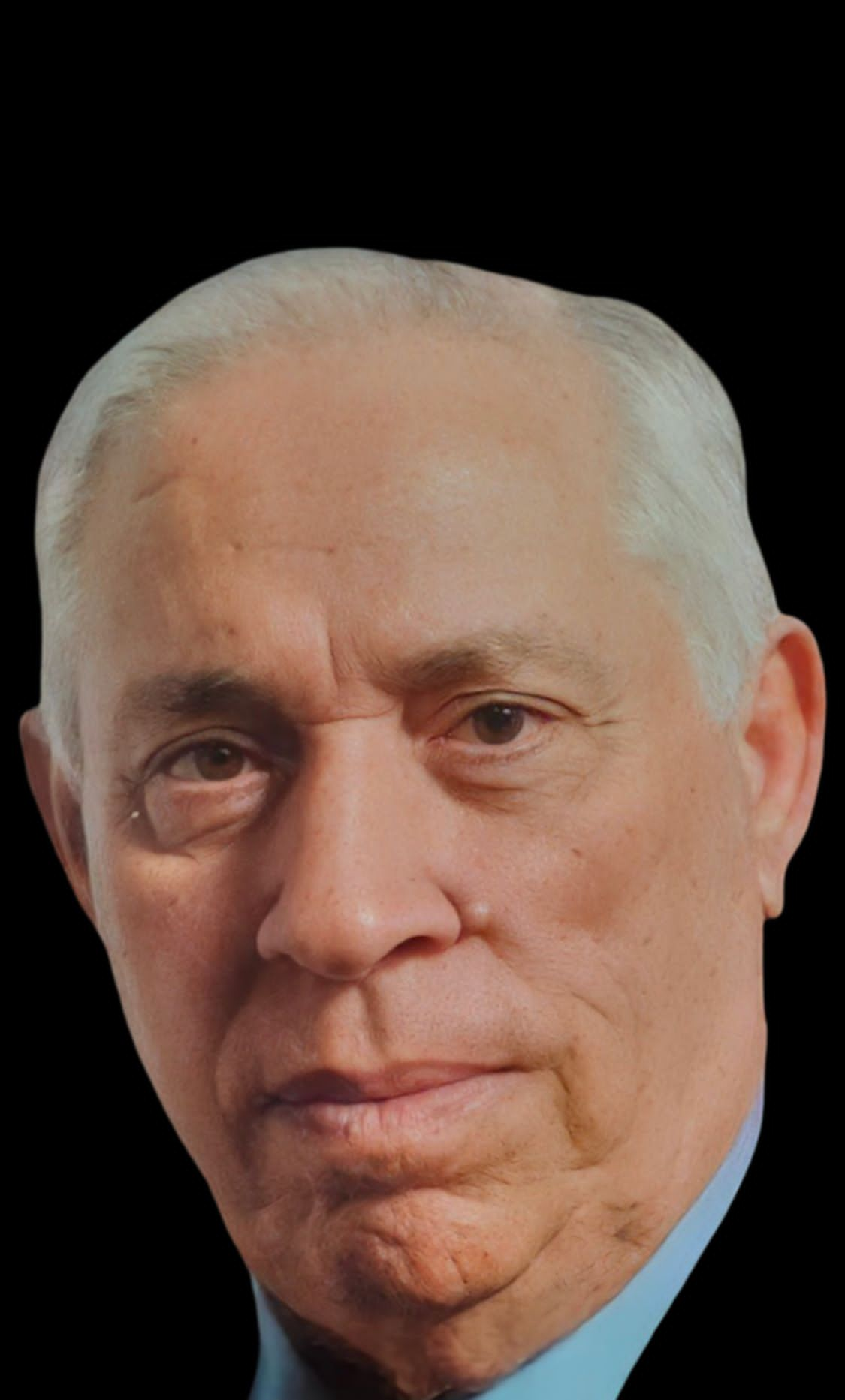
- Born: 28 February 1929; Jaljulia, Mandatory Palestine
- Died: 14 December 2021 (aged 92)
- Citizenship: Palestinian
- Education: Bar-Ilan University
- Occupations: writer, author, teacher

Mustafa Murrar (مصطفى مرار) (28 February 1929 – 14 December 2021) was an Israeli Palestinian storyteller and children's author. He published hundreds of stories, essays and children's stories, including 18 short story collections, novels and children's books for a total of 86 books. He also edited 22 books. His stories have been translated into Arabic, English, French, Spanish and German.

== Early life and education ==
Murrar was born and raised in a family of farmers in the Palestinian village of Jaljulia, near the city of Qalqilya, in Mandatory Palestine. He finished his primary studies in the school of Qalqilya due to the lack of a school in his village at the time. He then moved to study and graduate with distinction from the Amiri School in Qalqilya. While serving with the Palestinian Forces in the Israeli War of Independence, he was injured in an explosion and lost his leg. He was taken for treatment in Nablus Hospital, but was forced to return to Jaljulia in 1949 following the Rhodes Agreement, according to which his village was included in the Triangle area within the Israeli borders.

In 1952, after the establishment of the State of Israel, he finished his studies at the Teachers’ Seminar in Tel Aviv-Jaffa, Israel, and then joined the education system.

== Career ==
=== Early career ===
Murrar worked as a teacher and principal in the elementary school in Jaljulia. He also prepared and presented a radio program in Israel Radio (Arabic section) for children from 1958 to 1961. He was appointed chief editor of the Arab Publishing House in 1973, and later, in 1975, he completed his academic studies at Bar-Ilan University in Israel in Arabic language and political science. He continued to teach until 1982 at which point he retired to dedicate his time fully to writing.

Murrar served as a member of the Arab Culture Committee at the Israeli Ministry of Education, the Arab Writers Association in Israel, the Israel Writers Union, the International Organization of Writers, and a member of the Interfaith Fraternity Association in Israel.

=== Children's literature ===
His involvement in educational work and his daily closeness to the world of students expanded his interest in children's literature. He wrote for children in various outlets, and participated in editing children's magazines such as "Today for Our Children", "For Our Children", "Sinbad" and "Majallati". He then began writing pages devoted to children in the daily Palestinian newspapers, Al-Ittihad and Al-Sinara. After re-issuing Al-Islah magazine, he joined its editorial board and began to provide it with children's stories on a regular basis. He also wrote and presented a children's program for the Arabic section of the Israeli radio for four years.

=== Contribution ===
In covering his death, it was remarked that as an Arab writer in general, and a Palestinian within Israel in particular, the obstacles in his way were numerous and he did not receive in life the recognition befitting the magnitude of his contribution. Nonetheless, his contribution to Palestinian literature has been widely documented in local press, academic publications, and with numerous awards and honors. Several articles called him "the pillar of the Palestinian short story and Palestinian children's literature", and one of the contributors to the "formulation and crystallization of our [Palestinian] collective cultural identity. In 1988 he was awarded the Israeli Prime Minister's award for Arabic Literature which he refused to accept.

=== Select works ===
Among his most notable books:

- Alkhaima Almathqooba, 1970
- Tareeq El-Alam, 1970
- Qiladato ElAfa'a, 1972
- Ibni Fi Eljamea, 1972
- Janaztu El Shaitan, 1972
- Himaruna Wa Baretania, 1972
- Dama Wa Ramad, 1972
- Alsharee Al Taweel, 1972
- Alteen Wa Alshayateen, 1974
- Ayam Baladna, 1983
- Kitab Althawra, 1987
- Almashroo'a, 1987
- Alqonbula Alsharqia, 1988
- Awraq Matrood Elhalawani, 1997
- Nas Min Alnas, 1997

== Death ==
Murrar died on 14 December 2021, at the age of 92. His death was widely covered by the Palestinian media and his funeral was attended by thousands including former students, colleagues, local politicians, and members of the press.
