= Patrick Doeplah =

Liberian footballer

Personal information
- Date of birth: 27 October 1990
- Place of birth: Monrovia, Liberia
- Date of death: 22 March 2011 (aged 20)
- Place of death: Monrovia, Liberia
- Height: 1.75 m (5 ft 9 in)
- Position: Striker

Youth career
- Gardnersville
- Roots

Senior career*
Years	Team	Apps	(Gls)
2007	Mighty Barolle	?	(?)
2008–2009	LISCR	?	(?)
2009–2010	→ Hapoel Kfar Saba (loan)	32	(8)
2010–2011	Hapoel Kfar Saba	23	(9)

International career
2010	Liberia	2	(0)
- * Club domestic league appearances and goals

Patrick Doeplah (27 October 1990 – 22 March 2011) was a Liberian footballer who played at both professional and international levels as a striker.

== Career ==
=== Club career ===
Doeplah spent his youth career with Gardnersville and Roots, before playing senior football with Mighty Barrolle and LISCR. At the latter club, he was the subject of interest from Ghanaian side Asante Kotoko.

He instead signed on loan for Israeli club Hapoel Kfar Saba for the 2009–2010 season, before the deal was later made permanent.

=== International career ===
Doeplah earned two caps for Liberia in 2010.

== Death ==
Doeplah died on 22 March 2011 at the age of 20. He was found dead at a house in Monrovria, where he had been attending an Olympic training camp. He was said to have suffered a cardiac arrest.

== Career statistics ==
Club performance			League		Cup		League Cup		Continental		Total	
Season	Club	League	Apps	Goals	Apps	Goals	Apps	Goals	Apps	Goals	Apps	Goals
Israel			League		Israel State Cup		Toto Cup		Europe		Total	
2009–2010	Hapoel Kfar Saba	Liga Leumit	32	8	2	0	4	0	0	0	38	8
2010–2011	Hapoel Kfar Saba	Liga Leumit	23	9	2	0	3	1	0	0	28	10
Total	Liberia		-	-	-	-	-	-	-	-	-	-
Total	Israel		55	17	4	0	7	1	0	0	60	18
Career total			-	-	-	-	-	-	-	-	-	-
