= Moshe Abutbul (footballer) =

Israeli association football player

Moshe Abutbul משה אבוטבול
Personal information
- Full name: Moshe Abutbul
- Date of birth: 11 August 1984 (age 42)
- Place of birth: Ashdod, Israel
- Positions: Central midfielder; defensive midfielder

Team information
- Current team: Hapoel Ironi Kiryat Shmona
- Number: 27

Youth career
- F.C. Ashdod

Senior career*
Years	Team	Apps	(Gls)
2003–2004	F.C. Ashdod	?	(?)
2005–2008	Hapoel Ra'anana	?	(?)
2008–2009	Hapoel Ramat Gan	25	(1)
2009–2010	Hapoel Ashkelon	2	(0)
2010–2011	Ironi Bat Yam	24	(7)
2011–2013	Ironi Ramat HaSharon	81	(11)
2013–2015	Hapoel Ironi Kiryat Shmona	14	(1)
2015	Hapoel Ra'anana	8	(1)

International career
2002–2003	Israel U19	9	(0)
2004–2005	Israel U21	2	(0)
- * Club domestic league appearances and goals

Moshe Abutbul (Hebrew: משה אבוטבול; born 11 August 1984) is a former Israeli professional association footballer who plays for Hapoel Ra'anana. He plays as a central midfielder.

== Biography ==
=== Playing career ===
After being promoted from the F.C. Ashdod youth team, Abutbul made his professional debut on 16 August 2003 in a Toto Cup match against Maccabi Herzliya.

== Statistics ==
As to 25 August 2014

Club performance		Cup		League		League Cup		Continental		Total	
Season	Club	Apps	Goals	Apps	Goals	Apps	Goals	Apps	Goals	Apps	Goals
Israel		League		Israel State Cup		Toto Cup		Europe		Total	
2008–09	Hapoel Ramat Gan	25	1	1	0	7	0	0	0	28	1
2009–10	Hapoel Ashkelon	2	0	0	0	4	0	0	0	6	0
2010–11	Ironi Bat Yam	17	6	2	0	5	1	0	0	24	7
2010–11	Hapoel Nir Ramat HaSharon	13	4	0	0	0	0	0	0	13	4
2011–12	Hapoel Nir Ramat HaSharon	31	3	3	0	1	0	0	0	35	3
2012–13	Hapoel Nir Ramat HaSharon	32	4	0	0	1	0	0	0	33	4
2013–14	Hapoel Ironi Kiryat Shmona	13	1	0	0	0	0	0	0	13	1
2014–15	Hapoel Ironi Kiryat Shmona	0	0	0	0	0	0	0	0	0	0
Career total		133	19	6	0	18	1	0	0	149	20
