= Arab National Party =

Arab National Party الحزب القومي العربي המפלגה הלאומית הערבית
- Leader: Muhamad Kanan
- Founded: 19 February 2001
- Split from: United Arab List
- Ideology: Israeli Arab interest
- National affiliation: Arab List
- Most MKs: 2 (2001)
- Fewest MKs: 0
- Current MKs: 0 / 120

Election symbol
- קפ

The Arab National Party (Hebrew: המפלגה הלאומית הערבית, HaMiflaga HaLeumit HaAravit; Arabic: الحزب القومي العربي, al-Hizb al-Qawmi al-Arabi) is a minor Israeli Arab political party in Israel led by Muhamad Kanan.

== Background ==
The party was founded during the 15th Knesset when three Members of Knesset left the United Arab List; one founded National Unity – National Progressive Alliance, whilst the other two, Kanan and Tawfik Khatib created the Arab National Party.

The party did not participate in the 2003 elections, and in the run-up to the 2006 elections it looked like Kanan would join Hadash. However, the party then entered the election race, before withdrawing and announcing its support for Balad, though by then it was too late to take the party's name off the ballot. On election day the party picked up only 738 votes (0.02%), the second lowest in total and far below the electoral threshold of 2%.

The party contested the 2015 elections as part of the Arab List, an alliance with the Arab Democratic Party headed by Kanan. The alliance received just 4,301 votes (0.11%), failing to win a seat.
