= Nisan Danon =

Israeli footballer

Nisan Danon ניסן דנון
Personal information
- Full name: Nisan Danon
- Date of birth: 11 August 1993 (age 33)
- Place of birth: Ness Ziona, Israel
- Position: Forward

Team information
- Current team: Ironi Kuseife

Youth career
- Sektzia Ness Ziona

Senior career*
Years	Team	Apps	(Gls)
2011–2013	Sektzia Ness Ziona	11	(0)
2013–2014	Hapoel Ramat Gan	20	(3)
2014–2015	Maccabi Herzliya	15	(0)
2015	Ironi Nesher	1	(0)
2015	Maccabi Kabilio Jaffa	3	(0)
2015–2016	F.C. Kafr Qasim	17	(5)
2016–2018	Maccabi Netanya	25	(3)
2017–2018	→ Hapoel Katamon (loan)	15	(1)
2018	→ Hapoel Kfar Saba (loan)	14	(0)
2018–2019	Hapoel Ashkelon	19	(0)
2019	Hapoel Rishon LeZion	11	(0)
2019	Nordia Jerusalem	8	(1)
2019–2020	Ironi Or Yehuda	12	(0)
2021–2022	Shimshon Kafr Qasim	14	(0)
- * Club domestic league appearances and goals as of 1 June 2020 (UTC)

Nisan Danon (Hebrew: ניסן דנון) is an Israeli footballer who plays for the Israeli club Ironi Or Yehuda.

== Honours ==
- Liga Leumit
  - Winner (1): 2016-17
