= Alon Buzorgi =

Israeli footballer

Personal information
- Full name: Alon Buzorgi
- Date of birth: 29 March 1990 (age 36)
- Place of birth: Kiryat Shmona, Israel
- Position: Striker

Team information
- Current team: Hapoel Umm al-Fahm F.C.

Youth career
- Ironi Kiryat Shmona

Senior career*
Years	Team	Apps	(Gls)
2008–2010	Ironi Kiryat Shmona	2	(0)
2010–2012	Hapoel Haifa	15	(3)
2012–2013	Beitar Tel Aviv Ramla	13	(2)
2013	Hapoel Asi Gilboa	11	(5)
2013–2014	Hapoel Jerusalem	20	(6)
2014–2015	Ironi Tiberias	6	(1)
2015	Hapoel Herzliya	7	(0)
2015–2016	Hapoel F.C. Karmiel Safed	21	(5)
2016–2017	Maccabi Tzur Shalom	24	(15)
2017–2018	F.C. Haifa Robi Shapira	30	(17)
2018–2019	Ironi Kiryat Shmona	4	(0)
2019–2021	Maccabi Ahi Nazareth	60	(28)
2021–2022	Hapoel Afula	29	(8)
2021–2022	Hapoel Kfar Saba	10	(0)
2023–2024	Hapoel Nof HaGalil	26	(8)
2024	Hapoel Kfar Saba	6	(0)
2024–2025	F.C. Dimona	9	(3)
2025	Hapoel Azor	10	(2)
2025–2026	Hapoel Tirat HaCarmel	4	(1)
2026–	Hapoel Umm al-Fahm	1	(0)
- * Club domestic league appearances and goals as of 1 June 2026

Alon Buzorgi (Hebrew: אלון בוזורגי; born 29 March 1990) is an Israeli footballer currently playing for Hapoel Umm al-Fahm F.C..

== Career ==
=== Club ===
Buzorgi started his professional career with boyhood club, Ironi Kiryat Shmona.

On 21 September 2010 Buzorgi signed a 3-year contract with Hapoel Haifa.
