= Yossi Fliker =

Israeli footballer

Yossi Fliker יוסי פליקר
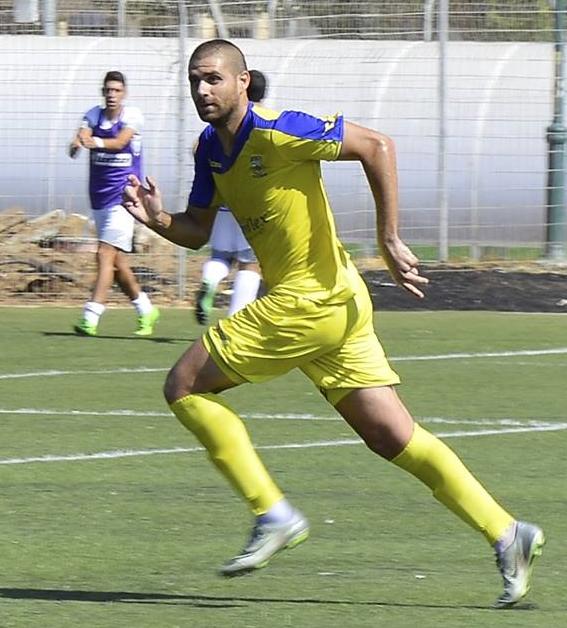

Personal information
- Full name: Yossi Fliker
- Date of birth: November 7, 1989 (age 36)
- Place of birth: Rishon LeZion, Israel
- Height: 1.88 m (6 ft 2 in)
- Position: Centre forward

Youth career
- 2001–2007: Hapoel Tel Aviv
- 2007–2008: Hakoah Ramat Gan

Senior career*
Years	Team	Apps	(Gls)
2008–2009	Hakoah Ramat Gan	3	(0)
2009–2010	→ Tzafririm Holon (loan)	28	(10)
2010	Hapoel Nir Ramat HaSharon	4	(0)
2011	→ Maccabi Ironi Bat Yam (loan)	16	(0)
2011	Hapoel Ashkelon	3	(0)
2012	Hapoel Kfar Shalem	12	(1)
2012–2013	Maccabi Ironi Bat Yam	28	(18)
2013	Maccabi Kabilio Jaffa	4	(0)
2014	Maccabi Ironi Bat Yam	22	(16)
2014–2015	Hapoel Marmorek	24	(12)
2015	Sektzia Ness Ziona	6	(2)
2016	F.C. Shikun HaMizrah	31	(12)
2017	F.C. Bnei Jaffa Ortodoxim	13	(1)
2017–2018	Maccabi Ironi Ashdod	25	(9)
2019	Shimshon Bnei Tayibe	8	(3)
2019–2020	Hapoel Nahlat Yehuda	7	(5)
- * Club domestic league appearances and goals

Yossi Fliker (Hebrew: יוסי פליקר; born November 7, 1989) is an Israeli footballer who plays for Shimshon Bnei Tayibe.
