= Tomer Ben Haim =

Israeli footballer

Tomer Ben Haim תומר בן חיים
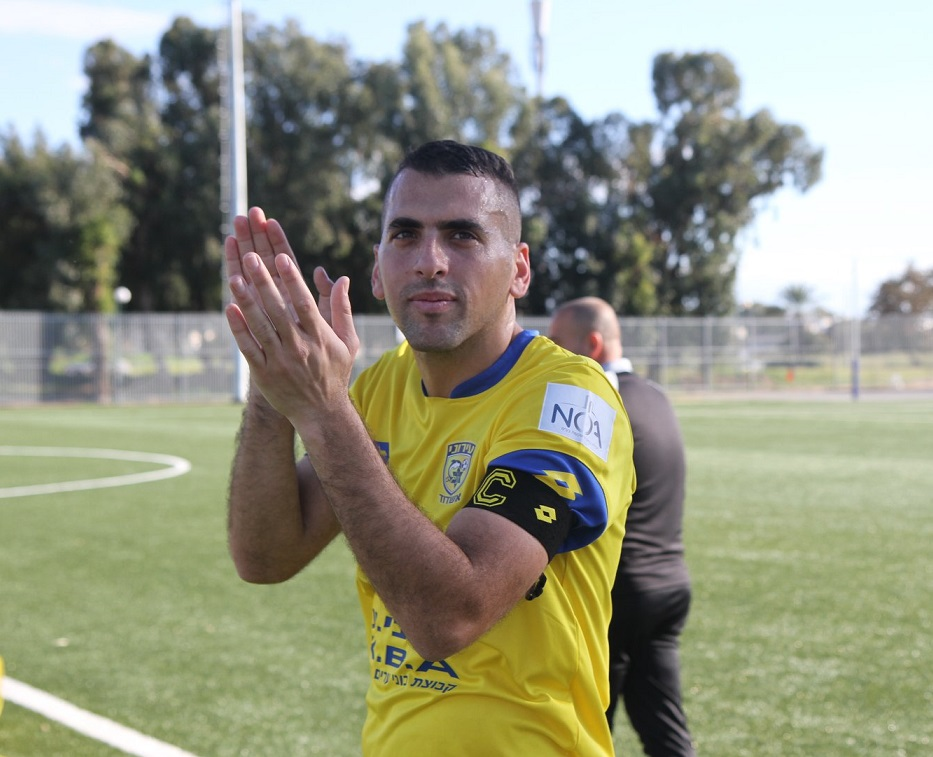

Personal information
- Full name: Tomer Ben Haim
- Date of birth: 2 January 1988 (age 38)
- Place of birth: Israel
- Height: 1.78 m (5 ft 10 in)
- Position: Midfielder

Team information
- Current team: Hapoel Azor

Youth career
- 2004–2007: Gadna Tel Aviv Yehuda

Senior career*
Years	Team	Apps	(Gls)
2007–2009	Hapoel Marmorek	62	(8)
2009–2010	Hapoel Petah Tikva	10	(0)
2010–2011	Sektzia Ness Ziona	22	(2)
2011–2012	Hapoel Ramat HaSharon	1	(0)
2012–2016	Maccabi Yavne	115	(5)
2016–2017	F.C. Kafr Qasim	33	(1)
2017–2018	Maccabi Yavne	24	(11)
2018–2020	Maccabi Ironi Ashdod	43	(13)
2020–2021	Hapoel Kiryat Ono	2	(0)
2021–	Hapoel Azor	131	(28)
2025–	→ Hapoel Kiryat Ono (loan)	21	(5)
- * Club domestic league appearances and goals as of 1 June 2026

Tomer Ben Haim (Hebrew: תומר בן חיים; born 2 January 1988) is an Israeli footballer who plays as a midfielder. He plays for Hapoel Azor.

== Honours as a player ==
- Hapoel Marmorek
  - Toto Cup For the third league: 2008–09
- Maccabi Ironi Ashdod
  - Liga Bet: 2018–19
