= Shimshon Bnei Tayibe F.C. =

Israeli football club

Shimshon Bnei Tayibe
- Full name: Shimshon Bnei Tayibe Football Club שמשון בני טייבה
- Founded: 1990
- Ground: Municipal Stadium, Tayibe
- Chairman: Yosef Masarwa
- Manager: Dudu Halaf
- League: Liga Bet South A
- 2023–24: Liga Bet South A, 10th
Home colours	Away colours

Shimshon Bnei Tayibe (Hebrew: שמשון בני טייבה, Arabic: أبناء الطيبة) is an Israeli football club based in Tayibe. The club is currently in Liga Bet South A division.

Shimshon Bnei Tayibe holds the record for most consecutive wins in Israeli football by a team at any level, with 25, which was achieved during the 2012–13 season in Liga Gimel Sharon division.

== History ==
The club was founded in 1990 and joined Liga Gimel. In the 1999–2000 season, Bnei Tayibe won the Sharon division and were promoted to Liga Bet, the fifth tier of Israeli football at the time. Although Bnei Tayibe were relegated back to Liga Gimel at the end of the 2002–03 season, they made an immediate return to Liga Bet and became one of the top clubs in the South A division. In the 2008–09 season, Bnei Tayibe won the South A division and were promoted to Liga Alef, which became the third tier of Israeli football, following the closure of Liga Artzit. In Liga Alef, the club finished the 2009–10 season in the 14th place at the South division, and had to play-off against Ironi Ramla of Liga Bet. Bnei Tayibe won the Relegation play-offs by a result of 1–0 and remained in Liga Alef. However, in the following season, the club finished bottom and dropped back to Liga Bet. In the 2011–12 season, Bnei Tayibe withdrew from the league after playing 19 matches, and were automatically relegated to Liga Gimel.

In the 2012–13 season, the club made a remarkable record of 29 wins and a draw in 30 matches and won Liga Gimel Sharon division. At 18 March 2013, Bnei Tayibe won their 22nd consecutive match by beating F.C. Rosh HaAyin 9–1, and broke the record for most consecutive wins in Israeli football by a team at any level, previously held by Hapoel Ramat Yisrael. The winning run stood at 25, after Bnei Tayibe drew 1–1 at the 26th match, in a derby against F.C. Tzeirei Tayibe.

In the 2013–14 season, the club finished bottom of Liga Bet South A division and dropped back to Liga Gimel, following a poor season, in which the club conceded 114 goals.

== Honours ==
- Liga Bet South A:
  - 2008–09
- Liga Gimel Sharon:
  - 1999–2000
  - 2012–13
