= Yonatan Revivo =

Israeli footballer

Yonatan Revivo יונתן רביבו
Personal information
- Full name: Yonatan Revivo
- Date of birth: February 15, 1988 (age 38)
- Place of birth: Ashdod, Israel
- Position: Midfielder

Youth career
- F.C. Ashdod
- Bnei Yehuda

Senior career*
Years	Team	Apps	(Gls)
2007–2008	Bnei Yehuda	0	(0)
2007–2008	→ Sektzia Ness Ziona (loan)	12	(1)
2008–2010	Maccabi Kiryat Malakhi	48	(7)
2010–2012	Maccabi Ironi Bat Yam	74	(8)
2012–2013	Maccabi Sha'arayim	3	(0)
2013	Beitar Kfar Saba	19	(6)
2013–2014	Maccabi Kiryat Gat	13	(1)
2014	Beitar Kfar Saba	18	(6)
2014	Maccabi Ironi Amishav Petah Tikva	4	(0)
2014–2015	Beitar Kfar Saba	29	(12)
2015–2016	Hapoel Ashkelon	19	(1)
2016	Maccabi Yavne	9	(4)
2016–2017	F.C. Kafr Qasim	33	(11)
2017–2018	F.C. Dimona	18	(2)
2018–2019	Hapoel Ashdod	22	(4)
2020–2021	Maccabi Ironi Netivot	22	(6)
2021–2022	Beitar Ashdod	18	(6)
- * Club domestic league appearances and goals

Yonatan Revivo (Hebrew: יונתן רביבו; born 15 February 1988) is a retired Israeli professional football (soccer) player.
