= HaShalom Stadium =

Stadium in Israel

Coordinates: 32.5332°N 35.1558°E

HaShalom Stadium Al-Salam Stadium
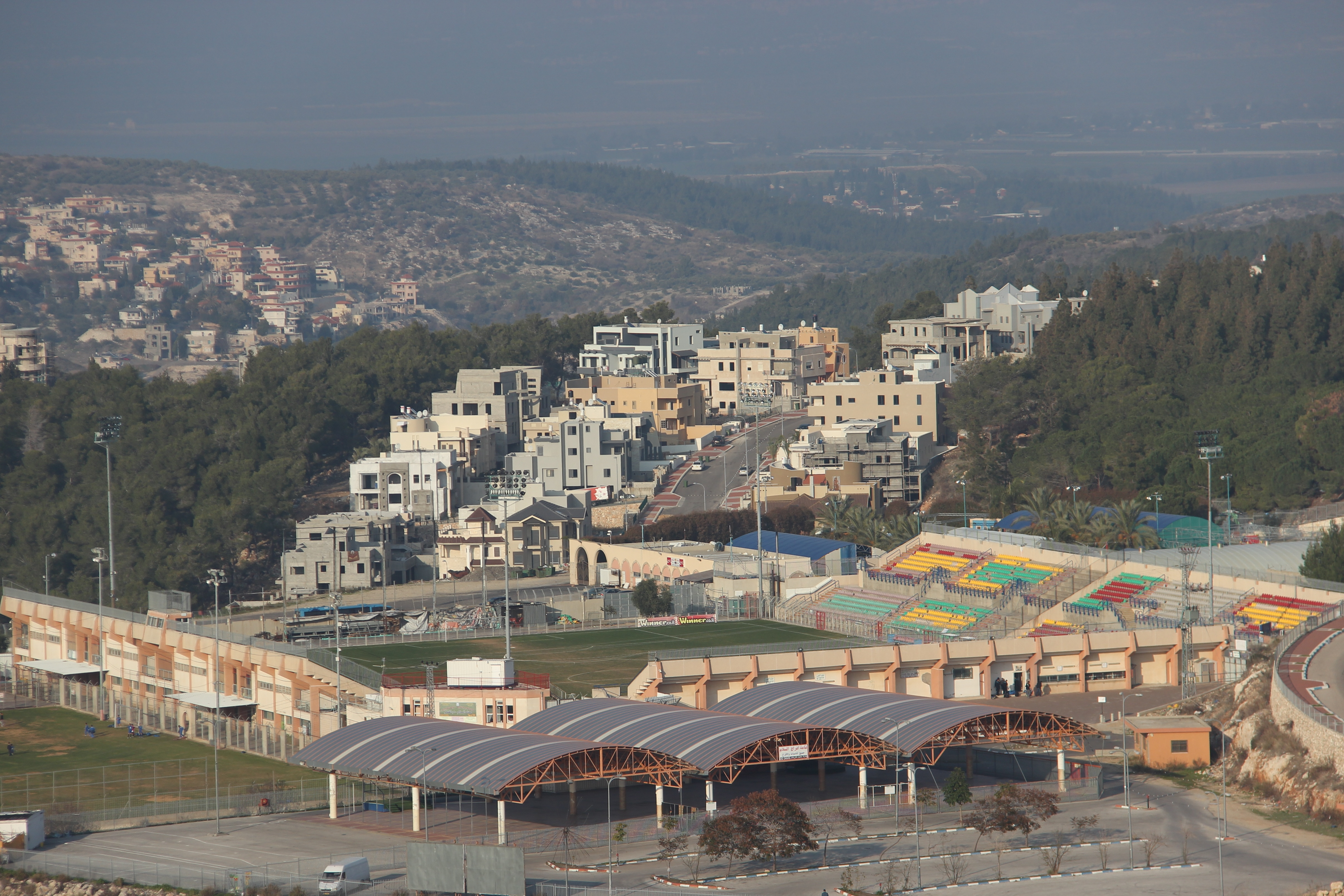
- Interactive map of HaShalom Stadium; Al-Salam Stadium
- Location: Umm al-Fahm, Israel
- Capacity: 5,800
- Surface: Grass

Tenants
- Hapoel Umm al-Fahm; Maccabi Umm al-Fahm

HaShalom Stadium (Hebrew: איצטדיון השלום) also known as Al-Salam Stadium (Arabic: ستاد السلام) is a stadium in Umm al-Fahm, Israel, with a capacity of 5,800. It is the home stadium of Hapoel Umm al-Fahm F.C. and Maccabi Umm al-Fahm F.C..
