= Jaljulia =

Jaljulia: גַ׳לְג׳וּלְיָה; جلجولية
- Local council

Hebrew transcription(s)
  - ISO 259: Ǧalǧúlya
  - Also spelled: Jaljulye (official); Djaouliyeh, Djeldjoulieh (unofficial)
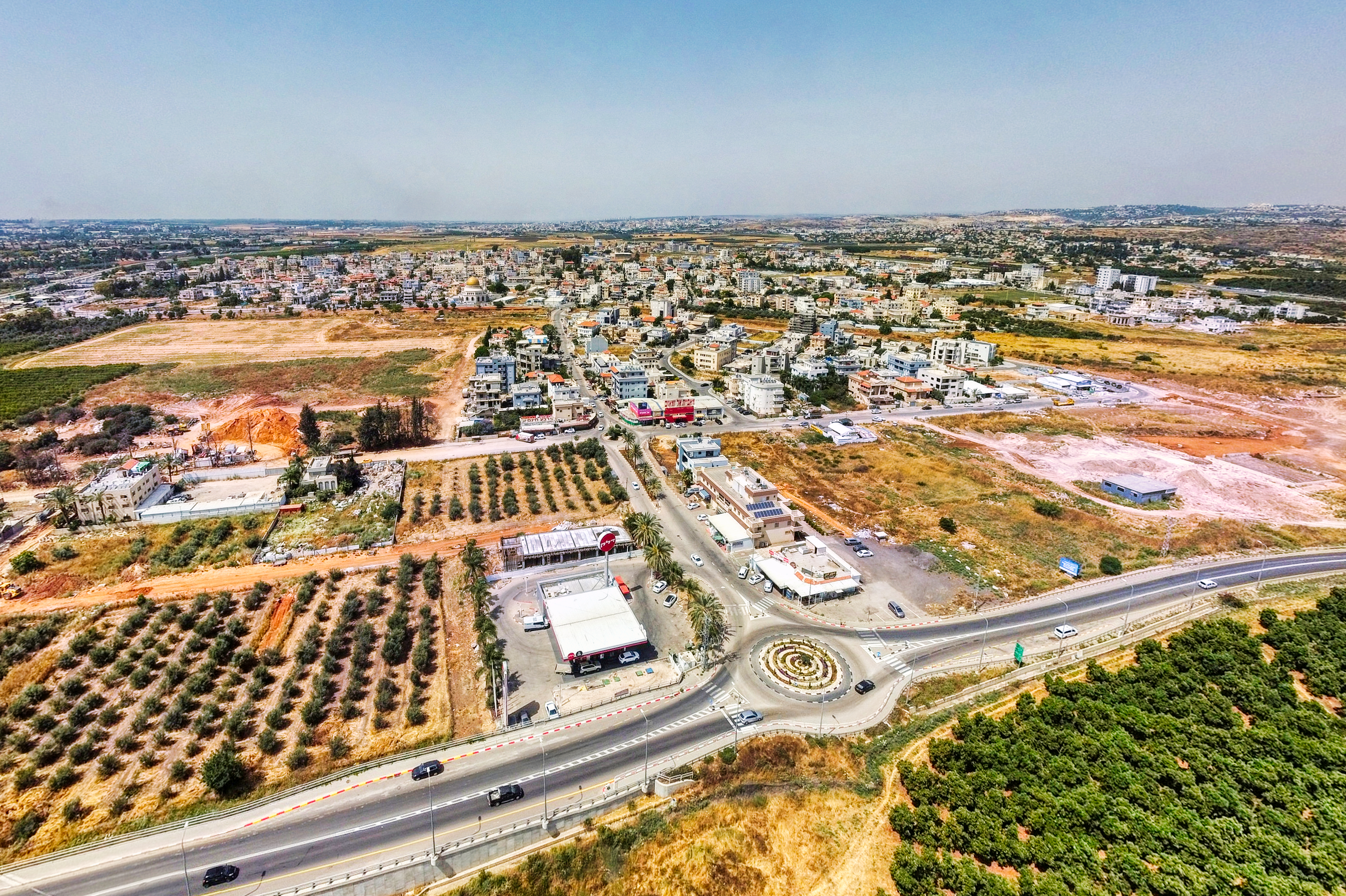

- Location within Central Israel Location within Israel
- Coordinates: 32°09′13″N 34°57′06″E
- Grid position: 145/173 PAL
- Country: Israel
- District: Central
- Subdistrict: Petah Tikva
- Natural Region: Southern Sharon

Area
  - Total: 1,900 dunams (1.9 km^{2}; 0.73 sq mi)

Population (2024)
  - Total: 10,992
  - Density: 5,800/km^{2} (15,000/sq mi)

Jaljuliya (Arabic: جلجولية, Hebrew: גַ׳לְג׳וּלְיָה) also spelled Jaljulye, is an Arab town in Israel near Kfar Saba. In 2024 it had a population of 10,992.

== History ==
An archaeological dig started in 2017 at Jaljulia uncovered, at about a five-meter depth, a half-million-year-old "paradise" for Homo erectus hunter-gatherers, including hundreds of knapped flint hand-axes. According to the Israel Antiquities Authority, recurrent occupation of the site indicates that prehistoric humans possessed a geographic memory of the place and could have returned here as a part of a seasonal cycle.

In Roman times the village was known as Galgulis, while during the Crusader period it was referred to as Jorgilia in 1241 C.E. It has been suggested that a Crusader sugar factory was later turned into an Ottoman mosque.

=== Mamluk Sultanate ===
In 1265 C.E. (663 H) Sultan Baybars allocated equal shares of the village to three of his amirs. One of these, amir Badr al-Din Baktash al-Fakri, included his section of the village in a waqf he established. Excavations of a building close to the Mamluk khan yielded ceramics dating from that period.

The mosque is locally known as Jami' Abu´l-Awn, which associates it with the 15th-century religious leader Shams al-Din Abu´l-Awn Muhammad al-Ghazzi, who is known to have come from the town. The architecture of the mosque is, according to Petersen, consistent with a 15th or early 16th century construction date. At present the structure consists of one large vaulted chamber, and three small barrel-vaulted cells. A large second chamber to the west was destroyed by British artillery during World War I.

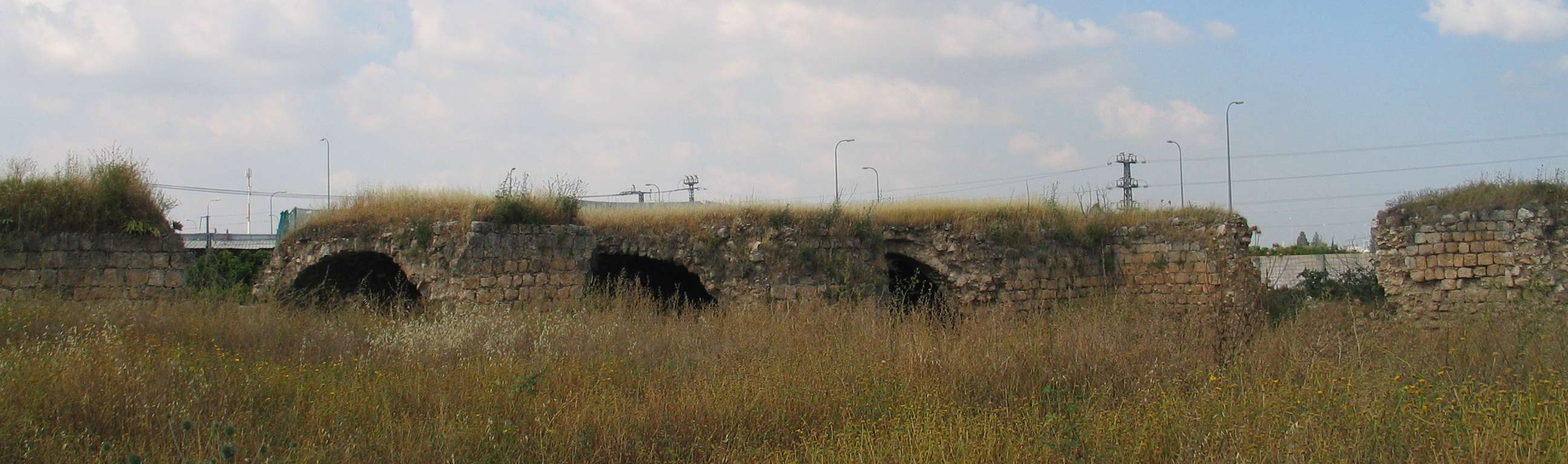
Mamluk Khan, Jaljulia

The khan is opposite the mosque. It was built by Sayf al-Din Tankiz, the governor of Damascus 1312–1340, and it was still functioning in the 16th century, when it was mentioned in an Ottoman firman. In the 19th century it was seen by Guérin, who described it as a beautiful khan with a (ruined) polygonal minaret. Petersen, who surveyed the structure in 1996, found the courtyard entirely overgrown and it was not possible to detect any features within; however, he notes that a 19th-century visitor had mentioned that there was "a great round well" in the centre.

=== Ottoman Empire ===
In 1517, the village was included in the Ottoman Empire with the rest of Palestine, and in the 1596 tax-records it appeared located in the nahiya (subdistrict) of Banu Sa´b, part of Sanjak of Nablus, with a population of 100 households, all Muslim. The villagers paid taxes on a number of crops, including wheat and barley, as well as "summer crops", "occasional revenues", "goats and bees", and a market toll. There was also a poll tax, jizya, paid by all the inhabitants in the Sanjak of Nablus. Total taxes were 18,450 akçe, of which 1/6 went to a waqf. Jaljulya and its khan continued to function as an important stop on the Cairo-Damascus road.

Jaljulia appeared under the name of Gelgeli on Jacotin's map drawn-up during Napoleon's invasion in 1799.

In 1870, Victor Guérin found that the village had six hundred inhabitants. In 1882, the Palestine Exploration Fund's Survey of Western Palestine described it as being a large adobe village on the plain. The mosque was described as fine, but ruined. A ruined Khan was also mentioned. Water was supplied by a well on the west side of the village.

In 1870/1871 (1288 AH), an Ottoman census listed the village with 62 Household in the nahiya (sub-district) of Bani Sa'b.

During the Sinai and Palestine Campaign of World War I, the village was on the Ottoman front line and was damaged by British artillery.

=== British Mandate ===
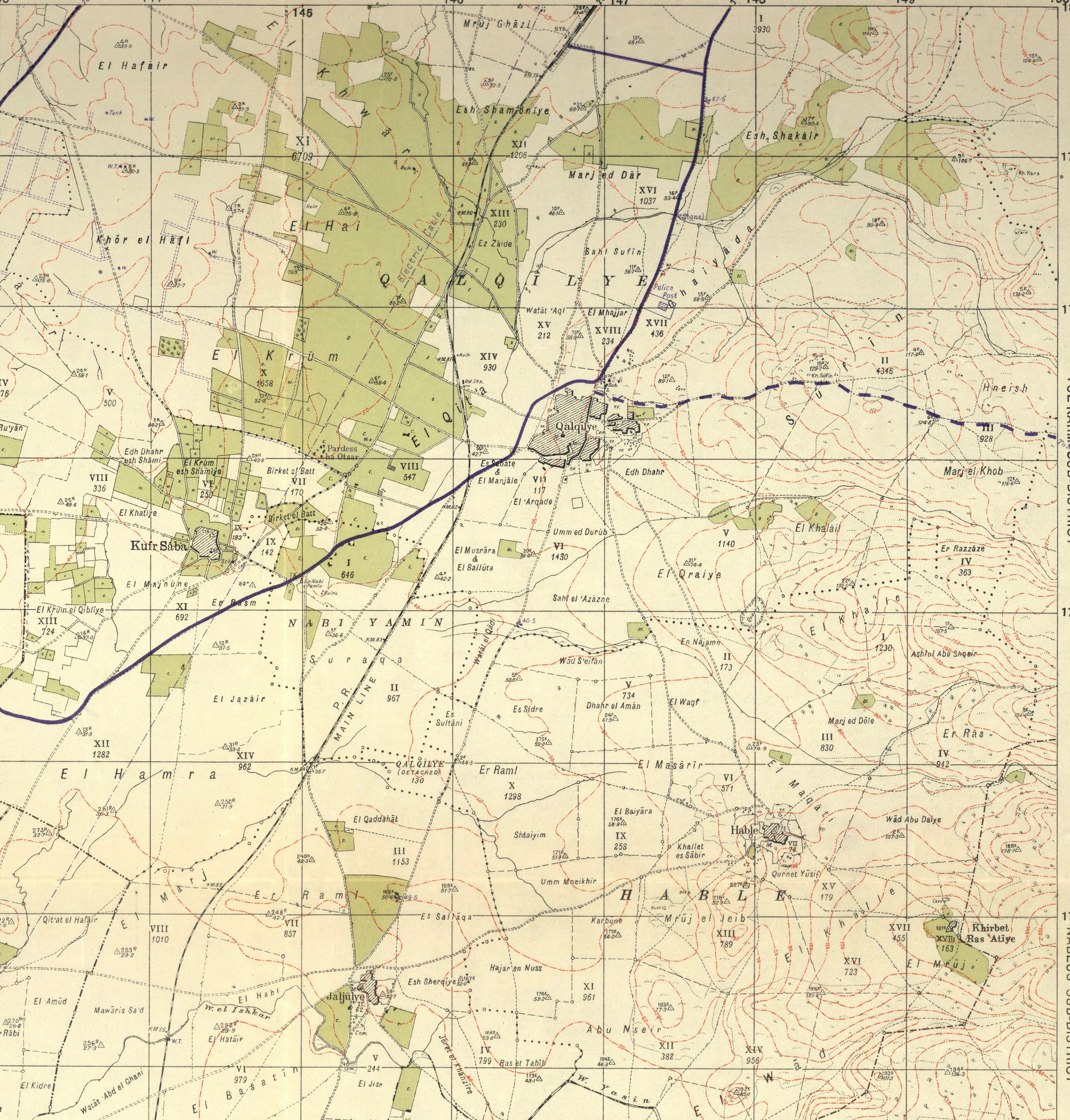
Jaljulia (Jaljulye) 1942 1:20,000

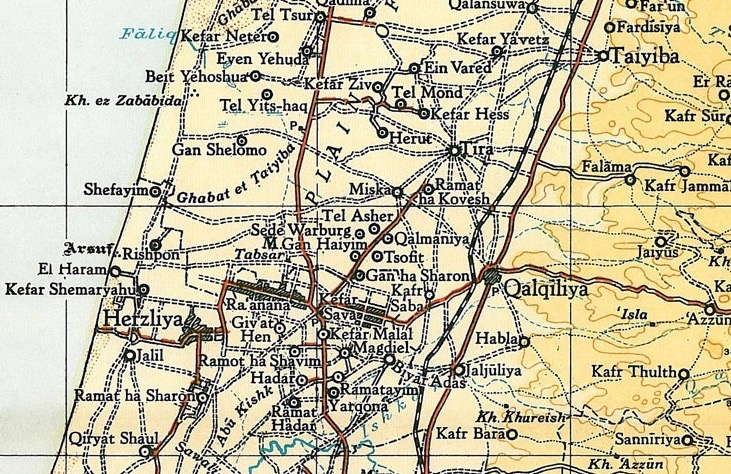
Jajljulia 1945 1:250,000

In the 1922 census of Palestine conducted by the British Mandate authorities, Jaljulieh had a population of 123 Muslims, increasing in the 1931 census to 260, still all Muslim, in a total of 60 houses.

By the 1945 statistics, the village had 740 inhabitants, all Muslims. They owned a total of 11,873 dunams of land, while 447 dunams were public. Jews owned 365 dunams of land. A total of 2,708 dunams were for citrus and bananas, 175 dunams for plantations and irrigable land, 9,301 for cereals, while 15 dunams were built-up (urban) land.

=== Israel ===
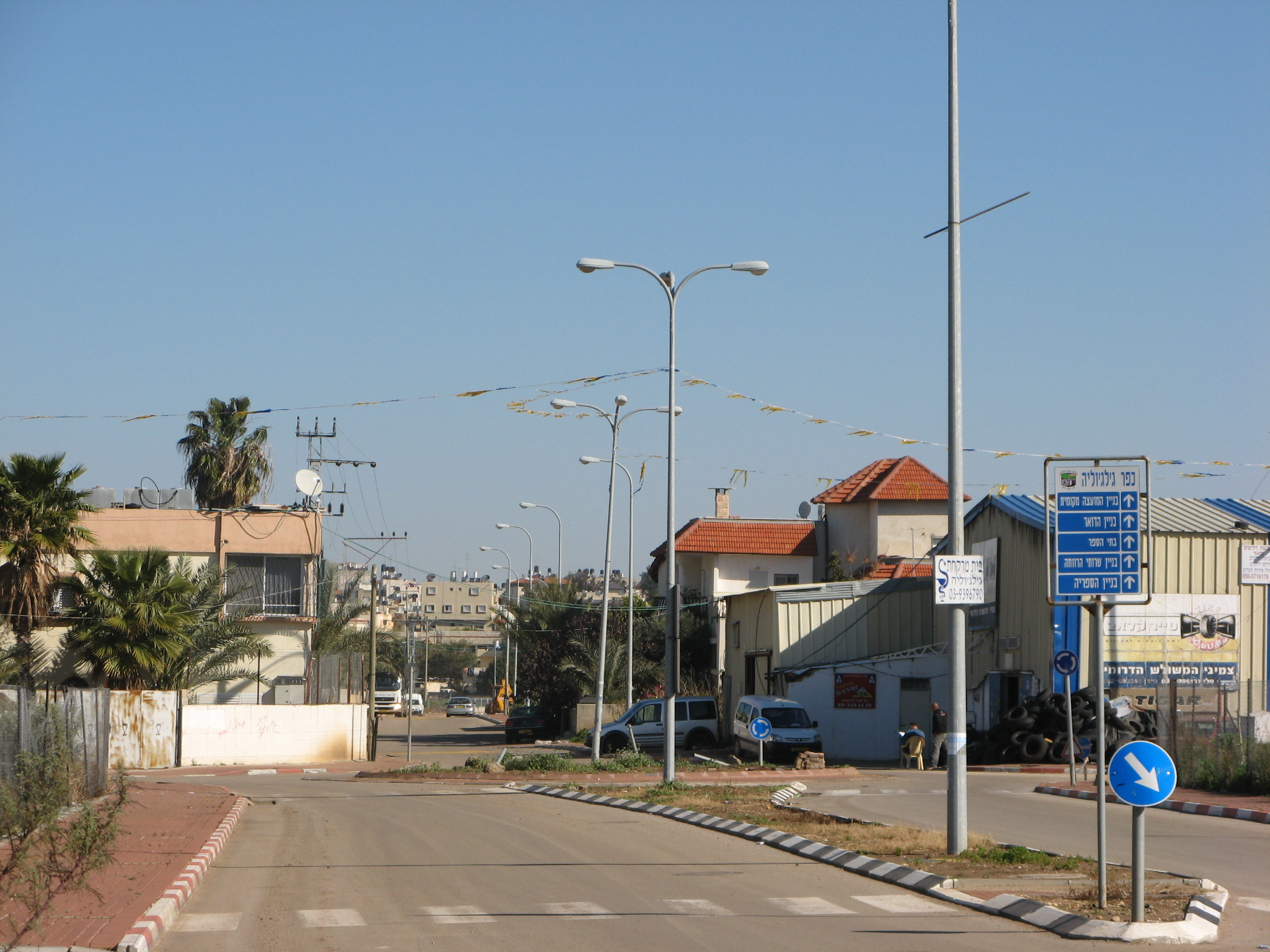
Jaljulia, southern entrance

After the 1948 war, Jaljulia was on the Israeli side of the ceasefire line and its became part of Israel. It was transferred to Israel in the 1949 armistice agreement.

Jaljuliya is noted among the villages of the Israeli Triangle "for the large number of refugee families living side by side in the narrow and crowded streets of its shikūn (state-funded housing), similar to refugee camps abroad."

In 2010, a tennis school was established in Jaljulia by Iman Jabber and Daniel Kessel. In 2011, 50 girls and 20 boys signed up for tennis lessons. The school organizes coexistence matches between Jaljulia and Ra'anana.

== Demographics ==
Historical population
Year	Pop.	±%
1972	2,500	—
1983	3,600	+44.0%
1995	4,500	+25.0%
2008	8,400	+86.7%
2022	10,502	+25.0%
2024	10,992	+4.7%

== Voting Patterns ==
In the 2022 election, 98 percent of voters in Jaljulia voted for the Arab parties, while 1 percent voted for the parties of the center-left coalition led by Yair Lapid and 0.4 percent voted for the parties of the right-wing coalition led by Benjamin Netanyahu. Among the voters for the Arab parties, 62 percent voted for Ra'am, while 20 percent voted for the Hadash–Ta'al list and 18 percent voted for Balad.

In the 2026 election, 97 percent of voters in Jaljulia voted for the Arab parties, while 3 percent voted for the parties of the center-left coalition led by Gadi Eisenkot and 0.2 percent voted for the parties of the right-wing coalition led by Benjamin Netanyahu. Among the voters for the Arab parties, 58 percent voted for Ra'am, while 42 percent voted for the Joint List. Voter turnout increased 33 percent from the 2022 election.

== Notable residents ==
- Anan Khalaily
- Tawfik Khatib, former Israeli Arab politician, Knesset member (1996–2003)
- Shadi Abu Dib, former Arab–Israeli footballer, youth team coach
- Mustafa Murrar, Palestinian storyteller and children's author

== See also ==
- Arab localities in Israel
- Barid, Muslim postal network strengthened in Palestine during the Mamluk period (roads, bridges, khans)

== Bibliography ==
- Barron, J.B., ed. (1923). Palestine: Report and General Abstracts of the Census of 1922. Government of Palestine.
- Buchennino, Aviva (2010-09-05). Jaljuliya (Gilgal). Hadashot Arkheologiyot – Excavations and Surveys in Israel.
- Clermont-Ganneau, C.S. (1896). [ARP] Archaeological Researches in Palestine 1873-1874, translated from the French by J. McFarlane. Vol. 2. London: Palestine Exploration Fund. ( p.37, p.340)
- Conder, C.R.; Kitchener, H.H. (1882). The Survey of Western Palestine: Memoirs of the Topography, Orography, Hydrography, and Archaeology. Vol. 2. London: Committee of the Palestine Exploration Fund.
- Delaville Le Roulx, J. (1883). Les archives, la bibliothèque et le trésor de l'Ordre de Saint-Jean de Jérusalem à Malte (in French and Latin). Paris: E. Thorin.
- Government of Palestine, Department of Statistics (1945). Village Statistics, April, 1945.
- Guérin, V. (1875). Description Géographique Historique et Archéologique de la Palestine (in French). Vol. 2: Samarie, pt. 2. Paris: L'Imprimerie Nationale.
- Hadawi, S. (1970). Village Statistics of 1945: A Classification of Land and Area ownership in Palestine. Palestine Liberation Organization Research Center.
- Hartmann, Richard (1910): Die Straße von Damaskus nach Kairo Zeitschrift der Deutschen Morgenländischen Gesellschaft › Bd. 64, passim; (Cited in Petersen, 2001)
- Heyd, Uriel (1960): Ottoman Documents on Palestine, 1552-1615, Oxford University Press, Oxford. Cited in Petersen (2001)
- Hütteroth, W.-D.; Abdulfattah, K. (1977). Historical Geography of Palestine, Transjordan and Southern Syria in the Late 16th Century. Erlanger Geographische Arbeiten, Sonderband 5. Erlangen, Germany: Vorstand der Fränkischen Geographischen Gesellschaft. ISBN 3-920405-41-2.
- Karmon, Y. (1960). "An Analysis of Jacotin's Map of Palestine" (PDF). Israel Exploration Journal. 10 (3, 4): 155–173, 244–253. Archived from the original (PDF) on 2019-12-22.
- Mayer, L.A.; Pinkerfeld, J.; Yadin, Y. (1950). Some Principal Muslim Religious Buildings in Israel. Jerusalem: Ministry of religious affairs. Cited in Petersen (2001)
- Mills, E., ed. (1932). Census of Palestine 1931. Population of Villages, Towns and Administrative Areas. Jerusalem: Government of Palestine.
- MPF: Ipsirli and al-Tamimi (1982): The Muslim Pious Foundations and Real Estates in Palestine. Gazza, Al-Quds al-Sharif, Nablus and Ajlun Districts according to 16th-Century Ottoman Tahrir Registers, Organisation of Islamic Conference, Istanbul 1402/1982. Cited in Petersen (2001).
- Palmer, E.H. (1881). The Survey of Western Palestine: Arabic and English Name Lists Collected During the Survey by Lieutenants Conder and Kitchener, R. E. Transliterated and Explained by E.H. Palmer. Committee of the Palestine Exploration Fund.
- Petersen, Andrew (2001). A Gazetteer of Buildings in Muslim Palestine (British Academy Monographs in Archaeology). Vol. 1. Oxford University Press. ISBN 978-0-19-727011-0.
- Pringle, D. (1997). Secular buildings in the Crusader Kingdom of Jerusalem: an archaeological Gazetter. Cambridge University Press. ISBN 0521-46010-7.
- Ritter, C. (1866). The comparative geography of Palestine and the Sinaitic Peninsula. Vol. 4.
- Röhricht, R. (1893). Regesta regni Hierosolymitani (MXCVII-MCCXCI) (in Latin). Berlin: Libraria Academica Wageriana.
- al-'Ulaymi Sauvaire (editor) (1876): Histoire de Jérusalem et d'Hébron depuis Abraham jusqu'à la fin du XVe siècle de J.-C. : fragments de la Chronique de Moudjir-ed-dynIndex: pp 115, 148, 154, 266
