= List of Israeli football transfers summer 2021 =

This is a list of Israeli football transfers for the 2021 Summer Transfer Window.

== Ligat Ha'Al ==
=== Beitar Jerusalem ===
In:

No.	Pos.	Nation	Player
—	DF	ISR	Amit Cohen (from Bnei Yehuda)
—	DF	VEN	Josua Mejías (on loan from (Spain) Leganés)
—	DF	ISR	Roy Herman (on loan from Hapoel Ra'anana)
—	MF	ISR	Omer Lakou (on loan from Ironi Kiryat Shmona)
—	MF	GUI	Kamso Mara (from (Czech Republic) Slovan Liberec)
—	FW	GHA	Edwin Gyasi (from (Turkey) Samsunspor)
—	FW	GHA	Richmond Boakye (from (Poland) Górnik Zabrze)
—	FW	ISR	Niv Zrihan (from Bnei Yehuda)
—	FW	ISR	Itay Levi (from Hapoel Petah Tikva)

Out:

No.	Pos.	Nation	Player
—	DF	ISR	Shay Konstantini (to Maccabi Netanya)
—	DF	POR	Diogo Verdasca (to (Poland) Śląsk Wrocław)
—	DF	ISR	Yoray Maliah (to Hapoel Jerusalem, previously loaned)
—	DF	ISR	Noam Hefzadi (to F.C. Jerusalem, previously loaned)
—	DF	ISR	Tal Ben Haim (Retired)
—	DF	ISR	Daniel Hava (to Bnei Eilat)
—	DF	ISR	Uri Magbo (to Hapoel Kfar Saba)
—	DF	ISR	Or Zahavi (to Bnei Yehuda)
—	MF	ISR	Nico Olsak (to Maccabi Petah Tikva)
—	MF	ISR	Idan Vered (to Hapoel Tel Aviv)
—	MF	NIG	Ali Mohamed (to Maccabi Haifa)
—	MF	BRA	Matheusinho (on loan to F.C. Ashdod)
—	FW	ISR	Eliran Atar (to Bnei Yehuda)
—	FW	ISR	Itay Levi (on loan to Hapoel Rishon LeZion)
—	FW	ISR	Roy Fadida (on loan to Bnei Yehuda)

=== Bnei Sakhnin ===
In:

No.	Pos.	Nation	Player
—	GK	ISR	Gad Amos (from Maccabi Ahi Nazareth)
—	DF	PLE	Abdallah Jaber (from Hapoel Hadera)
—	DF	SRB	Nikola Ćirković (from (Serbia) Čukarički)
—	DF	ISR	Omri Ben Harush (from F.C. Ashdod)
—	DF	CRO	Ante Puljić (from (Romania) Dinamo București)
—	MF	ISR	Gaby Joury (from Hapoel Kaukab)
—	FW	GHA	Richard Gadze (from (Moldova) Sheriff Tiraspol)
—	FW	ISR	Gaëtan Varenne (from Hapoel Be'er Sheva)
—	FW	GUI	Ibrahima Conté (from (Bulgaria) Beroe)
—	FW	ISR	Guy Melamed (from (Scotland) St Johnstone)

Out:

No.	Pos.	Nation	Player
—	GK	PLE	Rami Hamadeh (Free agent)
—	GK	ISR	Mohammed Abu Nil (on loan to Maccabi Bnei Reineh)
—	DF	ISR	Hassan Hilo (to Maccabi Bnei Reineh)
—	DF	AUT	Lukas Spendlhofer (loan return to (Italy) Ascoli)
—	DF	ISR	Ihab Shami (to Hapoel Jerusalem)
—	DF	ISR	Ali Ottman (to Hapoel Qalansawe)
—	DF	ISR	Tanos Banna (on loan to Maccabi Ironi Tamra)
—	MF	ISR	Mohamed Sayed Ahmed (to Maccabi Bnei Reineh)
—	MF	ISR	Bashar Shaheen (to Hapoel Bu'eine)
—	MF	ISR	Ismaeel Ryan (Free agent)
—	MF	COL	Sebastián Velásquez (to (United States) El Paso Locomotive)
—	MF	ISR	Ataa Jaber (to F.C. Ashdod)
—	FW	SUR	Nigel Hasselbaink (Free agent)
—	FW	ISR	Osama Khalaila (to Maccabi Tel Aviv)

=== F.C. Ashdod ===
In:

No.	Pos.	Nation	Player
—	GK	ISR	Sahar Hasson (from Hapoel Ramat HaSharon)
—	DF	ISR	Bar Natanel (from Maccabi Tel Aviv)
—	DF	ISR	Shay Ben David (on loan from Maccabi Haifa)
—	MF	CMR	David Nyengue (from Hapoel Hadera)
—	MF	ISR	Noaf Bazea (from Maccabi Ahi Nazareth)
—	MF	ISR	Naor Sabag (from Maccabi Petah Tikva)
—	MF	BUL	Martin Raynov (from (Bulgaria) CSKA Sofia)
—	MF	ISR	Ataa Jaber (from Bnei Sakhnin)
—	MF	ISR	Amir Agayev (from (Greece) Atromitos)
—	MF	ISR	Kenny Saief (on loan from (Belgium) Anderlecht)
—	MF	BRA	Matheusinho (on loan from Beitar Jerusalem)
—	FW	ISR	Lior Inbrum (from Maccabi Petah Tikva)
—	FW	ISR	Guy Dahan (on loan from Maccabi Haifa)
—	FW	ISR	Gal Katabi (from Maccabi Haifa)

Out:

No.	Pos.	Nation	Player
—	GK	ISR	Roi Mishpati (to Maccabi Haifa)
—	DF	ISR	Omri Ben Harush (to Bnei Sakhnin)
—	DF	ISR	Tal Shitrit (to Hapoel Marmorek)
—	MF	ISR	Roei Gordana (to Hapoel Be'er Sheva)
—	MF	ISR	Shlomi Azulay (to Hapoel Tel Aviv)
—	MF	CMR	David Nyengue (on loan to Hapoel Ra'anana)
—	MF	ISR	Ohad Rabinovich (to Hapoel Petah Tikva, previously loaned to Hapoel Jerusalem)
—	MF	ISR	Or Hassidim (to Maccabi Herzliya)
—	MF	BUL	Martin Raynov (to (Romania) FC Argeș Pitești)
—	MF	MLI	Moussa Bagayoko (on loan to Hapoel Kfar Saba)
—	MF	ISR	Nir Hasson (on loan to Hapoel Ashdod)
—	MF	ISR	Yoni Sisai (to Hapoel Ashdod)
—	FW	ISR	Dean David (to Maccabi Haifa)
—	FW	ISR	Bentzi Moshel (to Hapoel Ashdod)
—	FW	ISR	Guy Dahan (to Hapoel Umm al-Fahm, his player card still belongs to Maccabi Haifa)
—	FW	ISR	Stav Turiel (on loan to Hapoel Kfar Saba)
—	FW	ISR	Hamza Mawassi (on loan to Hapoel Ashdod)
—	FW	ISR	Idan Dahan (to Hapoel Ashdod)
—	FW	ISR	Idan Ashtiya (to Ironi Kuseife)

=== Hapoel Be'er Sheva ===
In:

No.	Pos.	Nation	Player
—	GK	ISR	Omri Glazer (from Maccabi Haifa)
—	GK	ISR	Ariel Harush (from (Netherlands) Heerenveen)
—	DF	ISR	Eyad Abu Abaid (from Hapoel Tel Aviv)
—	DF	ISR	Aviv Solomon (from Hapoel Kfar Saba)
—	DF	ISR	Eitan Tibi (from Maccabi Tel Aviv)
—	DF	POR	Hélder Lopes (from (Greece) AEK Athens)
—	MF	ISR	Roei Gordana (from F.C. Ashdod)
—	MF	ITA	Davide Petrucci (from (Italy) Cosenza)
—	MF	ISR	Dor Micha (from (Cyprus) Anorthosis)
—	FW	GHA	Eugene Ansah (from Hapoel Ra'anana)
—	FW	ISR	Itay Shechter (from Maccabi Tel Aviv)
—	FW	COL	Danilo Asprilla (from (Saudi Arabia) Al Qadsiah FC)
—	FW	AUS	Nikita Rukavytsya (from Maccabi Haifa)

Out:

No.	Pos.	Nation	Player
—	GK	ISR	Ohad Levita (to Hapoel Haifa)
—	GK	ISR	Raz Rahamim (to Maccabi Yavne)
—	DF	ISR	Eitan Ratzon (on loan to Hapoel Kfar Saba)
—	DF	ISR	Dudu Twito (to Hapoel Haifa)
—	DF	ISR	Sean Goldberg (to Maccabi Haifa)
—	DF	ISR	Loai Taha (to Hapoel Be'er Sheva)
—	DF	ISR	Roey Azut (on loan to Hapoel Rishon LeZion)
—	DF	ISR	Shalev Avitan (on loan to Hapoel Ramat HaSharon)
—	DF	ISR	Liran Cohen (on loan to Sektzia Nes Tziona)
—	MF	POR	Josué (to (Poland) Legia Warsaw)
—	MF	ARG	Marcelo Meli (loan return to (Argentina) Racing)
—	MF	ISR	Sintayehu Sallalich (to (Turkey) Gençlerbirliği)
—	MF	ISR	Ilay Madmon (on loan to Bnei Yehuda)
—	FW	BRA	Farley (to Hapoel Tel Aviv)
—	FW	ISR	Ben Sahar (to Maccabi Haifa, previously loaned to (Cyprus) APOEL)
—	FW	ISR	Gaëtan Varenne (to Bnei Sakhnin)
—	FW	COL	Jonathan Agudelo (to (Colombia) Rionegro Águilas)
—	FW	ISR	Netanel Askias (on loan to Hapoel Rishon LeZion)
—	FW	ISR	Itamar Shviro (on loan to Ironi Kiryat Shmona)

=== Hapoel Hadera ===
In:

No.	Pos.	Nation	Player
—	DF	ISR	Omer Danino (from Hapoel Kfar Saba)
—	DF	BUL	Ivaylo Markov (from (Bulgaria) Tsarsko Selo)
—	DF	ISR	Dolev Azruel (from Maccabi Herzliya)
—	MF	ISR	Omer Fadida (from Hapoel Kfar Saba)
—	MF	ISR	Awugu Asefa (from F.C. Haifa Robi Shapira)
—	MF	ISR	Amit Mor (loan return from Hapoel Afula)
—	FW	ISR	Mohammad Ghadir (from Bnei Yehuda)
—	FW	ISR	Roei Zikri (from Hapoel Tel Aviv)
—	FW	ISR	Aviel Ben Hemo (on loan from Hapoel Ramat HaSharon)
—	FW	ISR	Roei Zikri (from Hapoel Petah Tikva)
—	FW	ISR	Afik Katan (from Hapoel Haifa)

Out:

No.	Pos.	Nation	Player
—	DF	PLE	Abdallah Jaber (to Bnei Sakhnin)
—	DF	ISR	Noam Cohen (to Hapoel Haifa, his player card still belongs to Maccabi Tel Aviv)
—	DF	ISR	Tal Kachila (to Sektzia Nes Tziona)
—	DF	ISR	Sahar Dabah (to F.C. Kafr Qasim)
—	DF	ISR	Dan Lugasi (to Maccabi Herzliya)
—	MF	CMR	David Nyengue (to F.C. Ashdod)
—	MF	ISR	Shalom Edri (to Hapoel Umm al-Fahm)
—	MF	FRA	Kevin Tapoko (to Hapoel Haifa, previously loaned to (France) Grenoble)
—	FW	NGR	Odah Marshall (to (Turkey) Boluspor)
—	FW	ISR	Assi Guma (to Ironi Tiberias)
—	FW	ISR	Yahav Afriat (to Hapoel Rishon LeZion, his player card still belongs to Hapoel Hadera)

=== Hapoel Haifa ===
In:

No.	Pos.	Nation	Player
—	GK	ISR	Ohad Levita (from Hapoel Be'er Sheva)
—	GK	ISR	Tal Bomshtein (from Hapoel Ramat Gan)
—	DF	ISR	Dudu Twito (from Hapoel Be'er Sheva)
—	DF	ISR	Loai Taha (from Hapoel Be'er Sheva)
—	DF	ISR	Noam Cohen (on loan from Maccabi Tel Aviv)
—	DF	ISR	Ali Kayal (from Hapoel Acre)
—	DF	NGR	Izuchuckwu Anthony (from (Slovakia) Spartak Trnava)
—	MF	GAM	Saikou Touray (on loan from Maccabi Haifa)
—	MF	FRA	Kevin Tapoko (from Hapoel Be'er Sheva)
—	FW	SLO	Alen Ožbolt (from (Slovakia) Slovan Bratislava)

Out:

No.	Pos.	Nation	Player
—	GK	ISR	Ran Kadoch (to Bnei Yehuda)
—	GK	BIH	Jasmin Burić (Free agent)
—	DF	ISR	Yahav Gurfinkel (to (Sweden) IFK Norrköping, previously loaned from Maccabi Haifa)
—	DF	ISR	Ofek Fishler (to Hapoel Petah Tikva, previously loaned to Maccabi Ahi Nazareth)
—	MF	ISR	Ruslan Barsky (to Hapoel Jerusalem, his player card still belongs to Hapoel Haifa)
—	MF	ISR	Ben Sterling (on loan to Hapoel Nof HaGalil)
—	MF	ISR	Mohamad Jaradat (on loan to Hapoel Bnei Fureidis)
—	FW	NGR	William Agada (loan return to Hapoel Jerusalem)
—	FW	ISR	Ahmed Darawshe (to Hapoel Jerusalem)
—	FW	ISR	Afik Katan (to Hapoel Hadera)

=== Hapoel Jerusalem ===
In:

No.	Pos.	Nation	Player
—	GK	ISR	Yehonatan Shabi (from Hapoel Rishon LeZion)
—	DF	ISR	Ihab Shami (from Bnei Sakhnin)
—	DF	CZE	Ondřej Bačo (from (Romania) Gaz Metan Mediaș)
—	DF	CIV	Yao Eloge Koffi (from (Italy) Reggiana)
—	DF	ISR	Yoray Maliah (from Beitar Jerusalem, previously loaned)
—	MF	ISR	Guy Hadida (from Maccabi Petah Tikva)
—	MF	ISR	Ruslan Barsky (on loan from Maccabi Tel Aviv)
—	MF	NGR	Hamed Sholaja (Free transfer)
—	FW	NGR	William Agada (loan return from Hapoel Haifa)
—	FW	ISR	Ahmed Darawshe (from Hapoel Haifa)

Out:

No.	Pos.	Nation	Player
—	GK	ISR	Benny Peretz (Free agent)
—	DF	ISR	Tom Yehezkel (on loan to Hapoel Kfar Shalem)
—	MF	ISR	Ohad Rabinovic (to Hapoel Petah Tikva, previously loaned from F.C. Ashdod)
—	MF	ISR	Adis Chekol (on loan to Hapoel Kfar Shalem)
—	MF	ISR	Avihay Wedja (to F.C. Holon Yermiyahu)
—	FW	ISR	Matan Schwarz (on loan to Hapoel Kfar Shalem)
—	FW	ISR	Lidor Nakshari (to Hapoel Petah Tikva)

=== Hapoel Nof HaGalil ===
In:

No.	Pos.	Nation	Player
—	GK	NZL	Stefan Marinovic (from (New Zealand) Wellington Phoenix)
—	GK	ISR	Matan Ambar (from Hapoel Iksal)
—	DF	ISR	Dolev Azulay (from Maccabi Netanya)
—	DF	ISR	Fadi Najar (from Bnei Yehuda)
—	DF	ISR	Viki Kahlon (from Hapoel Ramat HaSharon)
—	DF	ISR	Yarin Peretz (from (Cyprus) Karmiotissa)
—	DF	BRA	Guti (from (Croatia) Osijek)
—	MF	ISR	Solomon Daniel (from Hapoel Ramat HaSharon)
—	MF	ISR	Ben Sterling (on loan from Hapoel Haifa)
—	MF	ISR	Elad Shahaf (from Maccabi Netanya)
—	MF	ISR	Timothy Muzie (on loan from Maccabi Haifa)
—	MF	ISR	Bar Cohen (loan return from Maccabi Tel Aviv)
—	MF	ISR	Yaniv Segev (Free transfer)
—	FW	JAM	Kevaughn Frater (from Maccabi Netanya)
—	FW	UGA	Luwagga Kizito (from Hapoel Kfar Saba)

Out:

No.	Pos.	Nation	Player
—	GK	ISR	Sagi Malul (to Maccabi Ahi Nazareth)
—	GK	ISR	Doron Michaeli (on loan to F.C. Tzeirei Kafr Kanna)
—	GK	ISR	Ziv Cohen (to Hapoel Petah Tikva)
—	GK	ISR	Ido Levi (on loan to Hapoel Iksal)
—	DF	GUA	Matan Peleg (to Hapoel Kfar Saba)
—	DF	ISR	Fadi Najar (to Maccabi Ahi Nazareth)
—	MF	ISR	Guy Dayan (to Maccabi Ahi Nazareth)
—	MF	ISR	Liad Elmaliah (to Hapoel Ra'anana)
—	MF	ISR	Munir Hujirat (on loan to Hapoel Bu'eine)
—	MF	ISR	Mahmoud Jaber (loan return to Maccabi Haifa)
—	MF	ISR	Lahav Dahan (on loan to Hapoel Migdal HaEmek)
—	MF	ISR	Ryan Agwad (on loan to Hapoel Bnei Zalafa)
—	FW	ISR	Dovev Gabay (to Maccabi Ahi Nazareth)
—	FW	BRA	Mateus Lima (on loan to Hapoel Rishon LeZion)

=== Hapoel Tel Aviv ===
In:

No.	Pos.	Nation	Player
—	DF	ISR	George Diba (from Hapoel Acre)
—	DF	ISR	Alon Azugi (from F.C. Kafr Qasim)
—	DF	GUI	Mohamed Kalil Traoré (from (Guinea) CI Kamsar)
—	MF	ISR	Idan Vered (from Beitar Jerusalem)
—	MF	ISR	Shlomi Azulay (from F.C. Ashdod)
—	MF	ISR	Yoav Hofmayster (on loan from (Austria) LASK)
—	MF	ISR	Yoav Tomer (from Hapoel Ra'anana)
—	FW	ISR	Raz Twizer (from Hapoel Acre)
—	FW	BRA	Farley (from Hapoel Be'er Sheva)
—	FW	BRA	Lúcio Maranhão (from Ironi Kiryat Shmona)

Out:

No.	Pos.	Nation	Player
—	GK	ISR	Ido Sharon (on loan to Hapoel Kfar Shalem)
—	DF	ISR	Eyad Abu Abaid (to Hapoel Be'er Sheva)
—	DF	ISR	Niv Serdal (to Hapoel Umm al-Fahm)
—	DF	ISR	Raz Shlomo (on loan to Maccabi Netanya)
—	DF	ISR	Tom Ahi Mordechai (on loan to Hapoel Ramat HaSharon)
—	MF	ISR	Guy Sivilia (on loan to Hapoel Ramat HaSharon)
—	MF	ISR	Dan Azaria (to Hapoel Kfar Saba)
—	MF	ISR	Itamar Efrat (to Shimshon Tel Aviv)
—	MF	ISR	Omri Altman (to (Portugal) Arouca)
—	FW	ISR	Omer Damari (Retired)
—	FW	ISR	Gil Itzhak (to Hapoel Kfar Saba)
—	FW	ISR	Roei Zikri (to Hapoel Hadera)

=== Ironi Kiryat Shmona ===
In:

No.	Pos.	Nation	Player
—	DF	CIV	Stephane Acka (from (Romania) Universitatea Craiova)
—	DF	ISR	Ayid Habshi (from Maccabi Haifa)
—	DF	ISR	Alaa Jafar (from Sektzia Nes Tziona)
—	MF	ROU	Ovidiu Bic (on loan from (Romania) Universitatea Craiova)
—	FW	ENG	Morgan Ferrier (from Maccabi Petah Tikva)
—	FW	MNE	Stefan Milošević (from (Belgium) Waasland-Beveren)
—	FW	ISR	Itamar Shviro (on loan from Hapoel Be'er Sheva)

Out:

No.	Pos.	Nation	Player
—	DF	ISR	Idan Nachmias (to Maccabi Tel Aviv)
—	DF	ISR	Uri Dahan (to Maccabi Haifa)
—	DF	ISR	Gal Shish (Retired)
—	DF	ISR	Amir Ben-Shimon (to Hapoel Ra'anana)
—	DF	ISR	Yuval Levin (on loan to Sektzia Nes Tziona)
—	DF	ISR	Dor Elo (to Maccabi Petah Tikva)
—	MF	NGR	Michael Amanga (on loan to Hapoel Iksal)
—	MF	ISR	Yoav Hofmayster (to Hapoel Tel Aviv, his player card still belongs to (Austria) LASK)
—	MF	GAM	Saikou Touray (to Hapoel Haifa, his player card still belongs to Maccabi Haifa)
—	FW	GHA	Eugene Ansah (to Hapoel Be'er Sheva, previously loaned from Hapoel Ra'anana)
—	FW	BRA	Lúcio Maranhão (to Hapoel Tel Aviv)
—	FW	ISR	Abdallah Khlaikhal (to (United Arab Emirates) Al Nassr FC)
—	FW	ISR	Ofir Mizrahi (to Ironi Tiberias)

=== Maccabi Haifa ===
In:

No.	Pos.	Nation	Player
—	GK	ISR	Itamar Israeli (from Hapoel Kfar Saba)
—	GK	ISR	Roi Mishpati (from F.C. Ashdod)
—	DF	ISR	Sean Goldberg (from Hapoel Be'er Sheva)
—	DF	ISR	Uri Dahan (from Ironi Kiryat Shmona)
—	DF	AUS	Ryan Strain (from (Australia) Adelaide United)
—	MF	NIG	Ali Mohamed (from Beitar Jerusalem)
—	MF	ISR	Mahmoud Jaber (loan return from Hapoel Nof HaGalil)
—	FW	ISR	Ben Sahar (from Hapoel Be'er Sheva)
—	FW	ISR	Dean David (from F.C. Ashdod)

Out:

No.	Pos.	Nation	Player
—	GK	ISR	Omri Glazer (to Hapoel Be'er Sheva)
—	GK	ISR	Guy Herman (to Hapoel Ashdod)
—	GK	ISR	Ariel Bardugo (to Hapoel Bnei Ar'ara 'Ara)
—	DF	ISR	Ayid Habshi (on loan to Ironi Kiryat Shmona)
—	DF	CMR	Ernest Mabouka (Free agent)
—	DF	GAM	Kabba Sonko (on loan to Hapoel Afula)
—	DF	ISR	Yahav Gurfinkel (to (Sweden) IFK Norrköping, previously loaned to Hapoel Haifa)
—	DF	ISR	Rony Laufer (on loan to Hapoel Afula)
—	DF	ISR	Tamir Arbel (on loan to Hapoel Afula)
—	MF	ISR	Ilay Hagag (on loan to Hapoel Afula)
—	MF	ISR	Ibrahim Jawabry (on loan to Hapoel Afula)
—	FW	NED	Yanic Wildschut (to (Bulgaria) CSKA Sofia)
—	FW	ISR	Nehorai Ifrach (on loan to Hapoel Afula)
—	FW	AUS	Nikita Rukavytsya (to Hapoel Be'er Sheva)
—	FW	ISR	Mohammed Awaed (on loan to Maccabi Petah Tikva)

=== Maccabi Netanya ===
In:

No.	Pos.	Nation	Player
—	GK	ISR	Adi Nasa (from Hapoel Bnei Lod)
—	DF	ISR	Shay Konstantini (from Beitar Jerusalem)
—	DF	ISR	Raz Shlomo (on loan from Hapoel Tel Aviv)
—	DF	ISR	Eyas Masalha (from Hapoel Iksal)
—	MF	ISR	Amir Berkovits (from Maccabi Tel Aviv)
—	MF	ISR	Ihab Abu Alshikh (on loan from Maccabi Haifa)
—	MF	ISR	Elad Kaplan (from Maccabi Tel Aviv)
—	MF	ISR	Shalom Edri (from Hapoel Umm al-Fahm)
—	MF	ISR	Eden Karzev (from Maccabi Tel Aviv)
—	MF	CIV	Parfait Guiagon (on loan from Maccabi Tel Aviv)
—	FW	ISR	Yaniv Mizrahi (from Beitar Tel Aviv Bat Yam)
—	FW	ISR	Mamoon Qashoua (from Hapoel Ramat Gan)
—	FW	SRB	Igor Zlatanović (from (Spain) Mallorca)
—	FW	GAM	Omar Gaye (from (Moldova) Milsami Orhei)

Out:

No.	Pos.	Nation	Player
—	DF	ISR	Dolev Azulay (to Hapoel Nof HaGalil)
—	DF	NED	Kellian van der Kaap (to (Denmark) Viborg FF)
—	DF	ISR	Matan Levy (on loan to Hapoel Acre)
—	DF	ISR	Ram Johaja (to Hapoel Bnei Ar'ara 'Ara)
—	MF	ZAM	Lameck Banda (to Maccabi Petah Tikva, his player card stlil belongs to (Russia) Arsenal Tula)
—	MF	ISR	Elad Shahaf (to Hapoel Nof HaGalil)
—	MF	ISR	Eilon Yerushalmi (to Hapoel Ramat Gan)
—	MF	ISR	Gabi Kanichowsky (to Maccabi Tel Aviv)
—	MF	ISR	Konstantin Oykin (on loan to Hapoel Tirat HaCarmel)
—	FW	ISR	Ben Azubel (to Hapoel Ra'anana)
—	FW	JAM	Kevaughn Frater (to Hapoel Nof HaGalil)
—	FW	CIV	Fernand Gouré (to (Belgium) Westerlo)
—	FW	ISR	Roy Korine (on loan to Hapoel Ramat Gan)

=== Maccabi Petah Tikva ===
In:

No.	Pos.	Nation	Player
—	GK	ISR	Marco Wolff (from (Argentina) Tigre)
—	DF	ISR	Yarden Cohen (from Hapoel Ra'anana, previously loaned)
—	DF	ISR	Dor Elo (from Ironi Kiryat Shmona)
—	MF	ISR	Nico Olsak (from Beitar Jerusalem)
—	MF	ISR	Ben Reichert (from Hapoel Kfar Saba)
—	MF	ZAM	Lameck Banda (on loan from (Russia) Arsenal Tula)
—	MF	SVK	Jaroslav Mihalik (from (Poland) Cracovia)
—	FW	ISR	Bar Nawi (from Hapoel Petah Tikva)
—	FW	NGR	James Adeniyi (from (Azerbaijan) Gabala)
—	FW	ISR	Michael Maman (from Hapoel Ramat Gan)
—	FW	ISR	Dor Jan (on loan from (Portugal) Paços de Ferreira)
—	FW	ISR	Mohammed Awaed (on loan from Maccabi Haifa)
—	FW	SEN	Ablaye Mbengue (from (Belarus) Dinamo Minsk)

Out:

No.	Pos.	Nation	Player
—	GK	ISR	Dor Hevron (on loan to Hapoel Rishon LeZion)
—	GK	ISR	Roei Maoz (on loan to Hapoel Azor)
—	DF	ISR	Itay Rotman (to Sektzia Nes Tziona)
—	MF	ISR	Naor Sabag (to F.C. Ashdod)
—	MF	ISR	Guy Hadida (to Hapoel Jerusalem)
—	MF	ISR	Ihab Abu Alshikh (to Maccabi Netanya, his player card still belongs to Maccabi Haifa)
—	MF	PAN	Armando Cooper (to (Panama) Árabe Unido)
—	MF	ISR	Muhammed Sarsour (to F.C. Kafr Qasim)
—	MF	GHA	Elvis Sakyi (to Hapoel Afula)
—	FW	ISR	Lior Inbrum (to F.C. Ashdod)
—	FW	PAN	Abdiel Arroyo (to (Panama) Árabe Unido)
—	FW	ENG	Morgan Ferrier (to Ironi Kiryat Shmona)
—	FW	POR	Jucie Lupeta (to (Romania) Argeș Pitești)
—	FW	ISR	Yoel Abuhatzera (to Bnei Yehuda)
—	FW	ISR	Tai Baribo (to (Austria) Wolfsberger AC)
—	FW	ISR	Liel Abada (to (Scotland) Celtic)
—	FW	ISR	Michael Maman (to Hapoel Ramat Gan)

=== Maccabi Tel Aviv ===
In:

No.	Pos.	Nation	Player
—	DF	ISR	Idan Nachmias (from Ironi Kiryat Shmona)
—	DF	ISR	Guy Mizrahi (loan return from Beitar Tel Aviv Bat Yam)
—	MF	ISR	Nadav Nidam (loan return from Beitar Tel Aviv Bat Yam)
—	MF	ISR	Bar Cohen (loan return from Beitar Tel Aviv Bat Yam)
—	MF	ISR	Eden Shamir (on loan from (Belgium) Standard Liège)
—	MF	ISR	Dan Biton (from (Bulgaria) Ludogorets Razgrad, previously loaned)
—	MF	ISR	Gabi Kanichowsky (from Maccabi Netanya)
—	MF	CUW	Brandley Kuwas (from (United Arab Emirates) Al-Nasr SC)
—	FW	ISR	Osama Khalaila (from Bnei Sakhnin)
—	FW	ISR	Ronen Hanchiz (loan return from Beitar Tel Aviv Bat Yam)
—	FW	CRO	Stipe Perica (from (England) Watford)

Out:

No.	Pos.	Nation	Player
—	GK	ISR	Ben David Musayof (on loan to Beitar Tel Aviv Bat Yam)
—	DF	ISR	Itay Ben Hemo (on loan to Beitar Tel Aviv Bat Yam)
—	DF	ISR	Eitan Tibi (to Hapoel Be'er Sheva)
—	DF	ISR	Bar Natanel (to F.C. Ashdod, previously loaned to Hapoel Kfar Shalem)
—	DF	ISR	Shahar Rozen (on loan to Beitar Tel Aviv Bat Yam)
—	DF	ISR	Michael Mor (on loan to Beitar Tel Aviv Bat Yam)
—	MF	ISR	Amir Berkovits (to Maccabi Netanya, previously loaned to Beitar Tel Aviv Bat Yam)
—	MF	ISR	Dor Peretz (to (Italy) Venezia)
—	MF	ISR	Elad Kaplan (to Maccabi Netanya)
—	MF	ISR	Nehorai Bitton (on loan to Beitar Tel Aviv Bat Yam)
—	MF	ISR	Niv Berkovic (on loan to Beitar Tel Aviv Bat Yam)
—	MF	ISR	Yonatan Cohen (to (Italy) Pisa)
—	MF	TAN	Novatus Dismas (on loan to Beitar Tel Aviv Bat Yam)
—	MF	ISR	Eden Karzev (to Maccabi Netanya)
—	MF	ISR	Bar Cohen (on loan to Hapoel Nof HGalil)
—	FW	ISR	Rotem Yatzkar (on loan to Beitar Tel Aviv Bat Yam)
—	FW	SRB	Aleksandar Pešić (to (Turkey) Fatih Karagümrük)
—	FW	ISR	Itay Shechter (to Hapoel Be'er Sheva)
—	FW	ISR	Or Roizman (on loan to Beitar Tel Aviv Bat Yam)
—	FW	ISR	Dor Turgeman (on loan to Beitar Tel Aviv Bat Yam)

== Ligat Lemuit ==
=== Beitar Tel Aviv Bat Yam ===
In:

No.	Pos.	Nation	Player
—	GK	ISR	Ben David Musayof (on loan from Maccabi Tel Aviv)
—	DF	ISR	Itay Ben Hemo (on loan from Maccabi Tel Aviv)
—	DF	ISR	Shahar Rozen (on loan from Maccabi Tel Aviv)
—	DF	ISR	Michael Mor (on loan from Maccabi Tel Aviv)
—	MF	ISR	Rotem Yatzkar (on loan from Maccabi Tel Aviv)
—	MF	ISR	Lior Katzav (from Hapoel Rishon LeZion)
—	MF	ISR	Nehorai Bitton (on loan from Maccabi Tel Aviv)
—	MF	ISR	Niv Berkovic (on loan from Maccabi Tel Aviv)
—	MF	PAN	Davis Contreras (from (Panama) Independiente)
—	MF	TAN	Novatus Dismas (on loan from Maccabi Tel Aviv)
—	FW	ISR	Or Roizman (on loan from Maccabi Tel Aviv)
—	FW	ISR	Amit Malka (from F.C. Tira)
—	FW	ISR	Dor Turgeman (on loan from Maccabi Tel Aviv)

Out:

No.	Pos.	Nation	Player
—	DF	ISR	Guy Mizrahi (loan return to Maccabi Tel Aviv)
—	DF	ISR	Or Sinai (on loan to Hapoel Azor)
—	DF	ISR	Ohad Atia (to Hapoel Acre)
—	MF	ISR	Amir Berkovic (to Maccabi Netanya, previously loaned from Maccabi Tel Aviv)
—	MF	ISR	Nadav Nidam (to Ironi Kiryat Shmona, his player card still belongs to Maccabi Tel Aviv)
—	MF	ISR	Bar Cohen (loan return to Maccabi Tel Aviv)
—	MF	ISR	Parfait Guiagon (to Maccabi Netanya, his player card still belongs to Maccabi Tel Aviv)
—	FW	ISR	Yaniv Mizrahi (to Maccabi Netanya)
—	FW	ISR	Ronen Hanchiz (loan return to Maccabi Tel Aviv)

=== Bnei Yehuda ===
In:

No.	Pos.	Nation	Player
—	GK	ISR	Ran Kadoch (from Hapoel Haifa)
—	DF	ISR	Erez Isakov (from Hapoel Afula)
—	DF	ISR	Netanel Amoyal (loan return from Hapoel Ra'anana)
—	DF	ISR	Or Zahavi (from Beitar Jerusalem)
—	MF	ISR	Yarden Abuhatzera (from Hapoel Ramat Gan)
—	MF	ISR	Ilay Madmon (on loan from Hapoel Be'er Sheva)
—	MF	ISR	Yisrael Zaguri (from Hapoel Umm al-Fahm)
—	FW	ISR	Omer Buaron (from Hapoel Acre)
—	FW	ISR	Yoel Abuhatzera (from Maccabi Petah Tikva)
—	FW	ISR	Eliran Atar (from Beitar Jerusalem)
—	FW	ISR	Roy Fadida (on loan from Beitar Jerusalem)

Out:

No.	Pos.	Nation	Player
—	GK	ISR	Barak Levi (to Hapoel Ra'anana)
—	GK	ISR	Omre Nir'on (on loan to Hapoel Ramat HaSharon)
—	DF	BRA	Michael Rangel (Free agent)
—	DF	BRA	Allyson (to (Turkey) Bandırmaspor)
—	DF	ISR	Raz Nachmias (to Hapoel Ramat Gan)
—	DF	ISR	Amit Cohen (to Beitar Jerusalem)
—	DF	ISR	Nehoray Gigi (on loan to Shimshon Tel Aviv)
—	MF	USA	George Fochive (to (United States) Portland Timbers)
—	MF	NIG	Yussif Moussa (Free agent)
—	MF	SRB	Matija Ljujić (to (South Korea) Gangwon FC)
—	MF	ISR	Stav Finish (Free agent)
—	MF	CHI	Pedro Campos (to (Chile) Everton)
—	MF	ISR	Ariel Lazmi (to Hapoel Petah Tikva)
—	MF	ISR	Kofee Yeboah (to Nordia Jerusalem)
—	MF	ISR	Yarden Abuhatzira (to Hapoel Rishon LeZion)
—	FW	MNE	Fatos Bećiraj (loan return to (Poland) Wisła Kraków)
—	FW	ISR	Mohammad Ghadir (to Hapoel Hadera)
—	FW	ISR	Niv Zrihan (to Beitar Jerusalem)
—	FW	ISR	Ilay Hen (to Maccabi Sha'arayim)
—	FW	ISR	Omer Buaron (to Hapoel Kfar Saba, his player card still belongs to Bnei Yehuda)

=== F.C. Kafr Qasim ===
In:

No.	Pos.	Nation	Player
—	DF	ISR	Yogev Lerman (from Hapoel Ramat HaSharon)
—	DF	ISR	Dror Nir (from Hapoel Ramat HaSharon)
—	DF	ISR	Sahar Dabah (from Hapoel Hadera)
—	MF	ISR	Muhammed Sarsour (from Maccabi Petah Tikva)
—	FW	ISR	Dor Moskovich (from Hapoel Umm al-Fahm)
—	FW	ISR	Mohamed Khatib (from Maccabi Ahi Nazareth)
—	FW	ISR	Mohammed Kalibat (Free transfer)

Out:

No.	Pos.	Nation	Player
—	GK	ISR	Yarden Krishtul (to F.C. Haifa Robi Shapira)
—	DF	ISR	Amid Mahajna (to Hapoel Umm al-Fahm)
—	DF	ISR	Kobi Mor (to Sektzia Nes Tziona)
—	DF	ISR	Alon Azugi (to Hapoel Tel Aviv)
—	DF	ISR	Idan Adhanani (to Hapoel kfar Shalem, his player card still belongs to Maccabi Petah Tikva)
—	MF	VEN	Carlos Espinoza (to Hapoel Iksal)

=== Hapoel Acre ===
In:

No.	Pos.	Nation	Player
—	GK	ISR	Tamir Lalou (from Hapoel Marmorek)
—	DF	ISR	Ahmad Shaaban (from Hapoel Ramat Gan)
—	DF	ISR	Daniel Mor Yosef (on loan from Maccabi Haifa)
—	DF	ISR	Guy Aviv (Free transfer)
—	DF	ISR	Matan Levy (on loan from Maccabi Netanya)
—	DF	ISR	Ohad Atia (from Beitar Tel Aviv Bat Yam)
—	DF	NGR	Ibrahim Muhammad (from (Portugal) Esperança Lagos)
—	MF	ISR	Gal Kolani (from Maccabi Ahi Nazareth)
—	MF	ISR	Yam Cohen (on loan from Maccabi Haifa)
—	MF	NGR	Aliyu Yau Adam (from (Latvia) Spartaks Jūrmala)
—	MF	ISR	Yarin Sharabi (on loan from Maccabi Netanya)
—	FW	ISR	Gil Hadad (from F.C. Haifa Robi Shapira)
—	FW	ISR	Yagil Ohana (on loan from Hapoel Be'er Sheva)
—	FW	ISR	Karem Arshid (from Sektzia Nes Tziona)
—	FW	ISR	Iyad Haj (on loan from Maccabi Netanya)
—	FW	ISR	Firas Ganayem (from Hapoel Bu'eine)
—	FW	GHA	Karim Abubakar (from (Spain) Yeclano)

Out:

No.	Pos.	Nation	Player
—	GK	ISR	Amit Keren (to Hapoel Ramat Gan, his player card still belongs to Hapoel Be'er Sheva)
—	DF	ISR	George Diba (to Hapoel Tel Aviv)
—	DF	ISR	Ohad Elbilia (to Hapoel Umm al-Fahm, his player card still belongs to Hapoel Haifa)
—	DF	ISR	Ben Binyamin (to F.C. Haifa Robi Shapira)
—	DF	ISR	Peter Elias (to F.C. Haifa Robi Shapira)
—	DF	ISR	Hanan Biton (to Maccabi Tzur Shalom, his player card still belongs to Maccabi Haifa)
—	DF	ISR	Ali Kayal (to Hapoel Haifa)
—	MF	ISR	Roei Har (to Hapoel Ramat HaSharon)
—	MF	ISR	Hen Yad'an (to F.C. Haifa Robi Shapira)
—	MF	ISR	Eliav Ben Ami (on loan to Maccabi Tzur Shalom)
—	MF	ISR	Roei Rabinovich (to Hapoel Ramat HaSharon, previously loaned from Maccabi Tzur Shalom)
—	MF	ISR	Eran Biton (to Hapoel Ra'anana)
—	FW	ISR	Omer Buaron (to Bnei Yehuda)
—	FW	ISR	Raz Twizer (to Hapoel Tel Aviv)
—	FW	ISR	Mahran Lala (to Ahva Kafr Manda)
—	FW	ISR	Hebetmo Gazahin (to Maccabi Ironi Ashdod)
—	FW	ISR	Ange Andino (to Hapoel Herzliya, his player card still belongs to Maccabi Haifa)
—	FW	ISR	Yagil Ohana (to F.C. Dimona, his player card still belongs to Hapoel Be'er Sheva)

=== Hapoel Afula ===
In:

No.	Pos.	Nation	Player
—	GK	ISR	Ezra Hanna (from Hapoel Azor)
—	GK	ISR	Daniel Benish (from Hapoel Ra'anana)
—	GK	ISR	Shareef Kayouf (on loan from Maccabi Haifa)
—	DF	ISR	Idan Nisimov (from Hapoel Bik'at HaYarden)
—	DF	ISR	Rony Laufer (on loan from Maccabi Haifa)
—	DF	GAM	Kabba Sonko (on loan from Maccabi Haifa)
—	DF	ISR	Tamir Arbel (on loan from Maccabi Haifa)
—	MF	CRO	Mario Babić (from (Italy) Sambenedettese)
—	MF	ISR	Dor Galili (from Sektzia Nes Tziona)
—	MF	ISR	Ilay Hagag (on loan from Maccabi Haifa)
—	MF	GHA	Elvis Sakyi (from Maccabi Petah Tikva)
—	MF	ISR	Ibrahim Jawabry (on loan from Maccabi Haifa)
—	FW	ISR	Michael Ashkenazi (from Ironi Nesher)
—	FW	ISR	Nehorai Ifrach (on loan from Maccabi Haifa)

Out:

No.	Pos.	Nation	Player
—	GK	ISR	Yossi Ginzburg (to Sektzia Nes Tziona)
—	DF	ISR	Erez Isakov (to Bnei Yehuda)
—	DF	CRO	Marko Ćosić (to (Croatia) NK Rudeš)
—	DF	ISR	Andi Takhaukho (on loan to Maccabi Ahi Iksal)
—	DF	LBR	Gizzie Dorbor (to F.C. Tzeirei Kafr Kanna)
—	DF	ISR	Idan Nisimov (to F.C. Haifa Robi Shapira)
—	MF	CRO	Antonini Čulina (Retired)
—	MF	ISR	Ilay Torst (to Sektzia Nes Tziona, previously loaned from Hapoel Be'er Sheva)
—	MF	ISR	Lite Younes (to Hapoel Bnei Ar'ara 'Ara)
—	MF	ISR	Roy Tzadok (on loan to Maccabi Tamra)
—	MF	ISR	Amit Mor (loan return to Hapoel Hadera)
—	MF	ISR	Tzlil Nehemia (to (Greece) Asteras Vlachioti)
—	FW	ISR	Dudu Biton (to Sektzia Nes Tziona)
—	FW	ISR	Guy Dahan (to F.C. Ashdod, his player card still belongs to Maccabi Haifa)
—	FW	ISR	Gal Katabi (to F.C. Ashdod, previously loaned to Maccabi Haifa)

=== Hapoel Ashdod ===
In:

No.	Pos.	Nation	Player
—	GK	ISR	Guy Herman (from Maccabi Haifa)
—	GK	ISR	Gal Navon (from F.C. Dimona)
—	DF	ISR	Osher Abu (from Hapoel Iksal)
—	DF	ISR	Liel Biton (from Sektzia Nes Tziona)
—	DF	ISR	Niran Rotshtein (from Maccabi Tamra)
—	DF	ISR	Benel Edri (from Maccabi Ahi Nazareth)
—	MF	ISR	Shavit Mazal (on loan from Hapoel Tel Aviv)
—	MF	ISR	Itamar Noy (from Hapoel Bnei Lod)
—	MF	ISR	Ben Amsalem (from Hapoel Rishon LeZion)
—	MF	ISR	Yoni Sisai (from F.C. Ashdod)
—	FW	ISR	Bentzi Moshel (from F.C. Ashdod)
—	FW	ISR	Nuriel Buzaglo (from F.C. Ironi Or Yehuda)
—	FW	ISR	Eli Elbaz (from Sektzia Nes Tziona)
—	FW	ISR	Hamza Mawassi (on loan from F.C. Ashdod)
—	FW	ISR	Idan Dahan (from F.C. Ashdod)
—	FW	ISR	Sheliel Uzan (Free transfer)

Out:

No.	Pos.	Nation	Player
—	GK	ISR	Guy Salem (Retired)
—	GK	ISR	Stav Flezental (to Shimshon Tel Aviv)
—	DF	ISR	Yuval Ben Ami (to F.C. Dimona)
—	DF	ISR	Philip Hayek (to Maccabi Kabilio Jaffa)
—	DF	ISR	Ben Turjeman (to F.C. Ramla)
—	DF	ISR	Oz Raly (to F.C. Holon Yermiyahu)
—	DF	ISR	Liel Trabelsi (to Maccabi Ironi Ashdod)
—	MF	ISR	Tal Ayela (to F.C. Dimona)
—	MF	ISR	Ohad Edelstein (to Shimshon Kafr Qasim)
—	MF	ISR	Naor Cohen (Free agent)
—	MF	ISR	Yanai David (to Hapoel Bnei Lod)
—	FW	ISR	Ohad Kadousi (to Hapoel Kfar Shalem)
—	FW	ISR	Yossi Asayag (to Hapoel Petah Tikva)

=== Hapoel Kfar Saba ===
In:

No.	Pos.	Nation	Player
—	DF	ISR	Yonatan Levi (on loan from Maccabi Haifa)
—	DF	ISR	Eitan Ratzon (on loan from Hapoel Be'er Sheva)
—	DF	GUA	Matan Peleg (from Hapoel Nof HaGalil)
—	MF	ISR	Gal Shalhevet (from F.C. Haifa Robi Shapira)
—	MF	ISR	Ido Davidov (from Sektzia Nes Tziona)
—	MF	ISR	Dan Azaria (from Hapoel Tel Aviv)
—	MF	ISR	Daniel Seneor (from Hapoel Bnei Lod)
—	MF	ISR	Saher Taji (from Sektzia Nes Tziona)
—	MF	MLI	Moussa Bagayoko (on loan from F.C. Ashdod)
—	FW	ISR	Gil Itzhak (from Hapoel Tel Aviv)
—	FW	ISR	Walid Darwish (from Sektzia Nes Tziona)
—	FW	ISR	Nir Azaria (from F.C. Tira)
—	FW	ISR	Stav Turiel (on loan from F.C. Ashdod)
—	FW	ISR	Omer Buaron (from Bnei Yehuda, his player card still belongs to Hapoel Kfar Saba)

Out:

No.	Pos.	Nation	Player
—	GK	ISR	Itamar Israeli (to Maccabi Haifa)
—	DF	ISR	Aviv Solomon (to Hapoel Be'er Sheva)
—	DF	ISR	Omer Danino (to Hapoel Hadera)
—	DF	NGR	Sodiq Atanda (to (Kosovo) Prishtina)
—	DF	ISR	Tom Shelach (Free agent)
—	DF	ISR	Triko Gatehun (to Hapoel Rishon LeZion)
—	MF	ISR	Ben Reichert (to Maccabi Petah Tikva)
—	MF	LTU	Domantas Šimkus (to (Azerbaijan) Sabail FK)
—	MF	KOS	Florent Hasani (to (Hungary) Gyirmót)
—	MF	ISR	Omer Fadida (to Hapoel Hadera)
—	MF	ISR	Omer Lakou (to Beitar Jerusalem, his player card still belongs to Ironi Kiryat Shmona)
—	MF	ISR	Or Dasa (to (Portugal) Arouca, previously loaned from Hapoel Ra'anana)
—	MF	ENG	Jamie Hopcutt (to (England) Oldham Athletic)
—	MF	ISR	Timothy Muzie (to Hapoel Nof HaGalil)
—	FW	UGA	Luwagga Kizito (to Hapoel Nof HaGalil)
—	FW	FRA	Amadou Soukouna (Free agent)
—	FW	ISR	Nir Azaria (to F.C. Tira)

=== Hapoel Petah Tikva ===
In:

No.	Pos.	Nation	Player
—	DF	ISR	Haim Izrin (from Hapoel Ra'anana)
—	DF	ISR	Zach Baleli (from Hapoel Kfar Shalem)
—	DF	ISR	Ofek Fishler (from Hapoel Haifa)
—	MF	ISR	Yarden Cohen (from Maccabi Ahi Nazareth)
—	DF	ISR	Ran Vaturi (from Sektzia Nes Tziona)
—	MF	ISR	Mohammed Badir (from Maccabi Herzliya)
—	MF	ISR	Daniel Twizer (from Hapoel Ra'anana)
—	MF	ISR	Ariel Lazmi (from Bnei Yehuda)
—	MF	ISR	Tomer Barzilay (from Hapoel Ra'anana)
—	MF	ISR	Ilay Tamam (on loan from Hapoel Tel Aviv)
—	MF	ISR	Omer Korsia (from Hapoel Ramat HaSharon)
—	FW	ISR	Nir Sharon (from Maccabi Sha'arayim)
—	FW	ISR	Yossi Asayag (from Hapoel Ashdod)
—	FW	ISR	Lidor Nakshari (from Hapoel Jerusalem)
—	FW	ISR	Roei Zikri (from Hapoel Hadera)

Out:

No.	Pos.	Nation	Player
—	GK	ISR	Rotem Dahan (to F.C. Dimona)
—	DF	ISR	Paz Ben Ari (to Hapoel Ramat Gan)
—	DF	ISR	Itzik Sholmyster (to Maccabi Ahi Nazareth, his player card still belongs to Hapoel Tel Aviv)
—	DF	ISR	Idan Weintraub (to Hapoel Herzliya)
—	DF	ISR	Tzlil Nehemia (to Hapoel Afula)
—	MF	ISR	Sagi Dror (to Hapoel Ramat Gan)
—	MF	ISR	Shay Golan (to Hapoel Rishon LeZion)
—	MF	BRA	Higor Vidal (to (Greece) Anagennisi Karditsas)
—	MF	ISR	Yam Ben Yehuda (to Bnei Herzliya, previously loaned to F.C. Yermiyahu Holon)
—	MF	ISR	Ilay Tamam (to Hapoel Petah Tikva, his player card still belongs to Hapoel Tel Aviv)
—	MF	CIV	Yaya Meledje (to (Morocco) Mouloudia Oujda)
—	MF	ISR	Muhamed Agbaria (to F.C. Holon Yermiyahu)
—	FW	ISR	Itay Levi (to Beitar Jerusalem)
—	FW	ISR	Elior Mishali (to Hapoel Ramat HaSharon)
—	FW	LBR	Terrence Tisdell (to (Turkey) Kocaelispor)
—	FW	ISR	Gal Assulin (to F.C. Holon Yermiyahu)
—	FW	ISR	Amit Yeverbaum (Free agent)
—	FW	ISR	Yossi Asayag (to Shimshon Kafr Qasim)
—	FW	ISR	Aner Shechter (to Maccabi Herzliya)

=== Hapoel Ra'anana ===
In:

No.	Pos.	Nation	Player
—	GK	ISR	Barak Levi (from Bnei Yehuda)
—	DF	ISR	Amir Ben-Shimon (from Ironi Kiryat Shmona)
—	DF	ISR	Moshiko Biels (from Maccabi Kabilio Jaffa)
—	DF	ISR	Bar Hillel (from Hapoel Iksal)
—	MF	ISR	Yonathan Farber (from Maccabi Kabilio Jaffa)
—	MF	ISR	Liad Elmaliah (from Hapoel Nof HaGalil)
—	MF	CMR	David Nyengue (on loan from F.C. Ashdod)
—	MF	ISR	Gal Aviv (on loan from F.C. Ashdod)
—	MF	ISR	Eran Biton (from Hapoel Acre)
—	FW	ISR	Nir Abergil (from Hapoel Iksal)
—	FW	ISR	Mohammed Awadah (from F.C. Tzeirei Kafr Kanna)
—	FW	ISR	Tom Madhele (from Maccabi Kabilio Jaffa)
—	FW	ISR	Ben Azubel (from Maccabi Netanya)

Out:

No.	Pos.	Nation	Player
—	GK	ISR	Daniel Benish (to Hapoel Afula)
—	DF	ISR	Yarden Cohen (to Maccabi Petah Tikva, previously loaned)
—	DF	ISR	David Tiram (to Hapoel Ramat HaSharon)
—	DF	ISR	Haim Izrin (to Hapoel Petah Tikva)
—	DF	ISR	Netanel Amoyal (loan return to Bnei Yehuda)
—	DF	ISR	Roy Herman (on loan to Beitar Jerusalem)
—	DF	ISR	Afek Navot (Free agent)
—	MF	ISR	Yarin Sharabi (to Hapoel Nir Ramat HaSharon, his player card still belongs to Maccabi Netanya)
—	MF	ISR	Yoav Tomer (to Hapoel Tel Aviv)
—	MF	ISR	Or Dasa (to (Portugal) Arouca, previously loaned to Hapoel Kfar Saba)
—	MF	ISR	Daniel Twizer (to Hapoel Petah Tikva)
—	MF	ISR	Itay Katzav (to Hapoel Herzliya)
—	MF	ISR	Tomer Barzilay (to Hapoel Petah Tikva)
—	FW	GHA	Eugene Ansah (to Hapoel Be'er Sheva, previously loaned to Ironi Kiryst Shmona)
—	FW	NGR	Bede Osuji (to (Slovenia) FC Koper)
—	FW	ISR	Nir Abergil (to Ironi Tiberias)

=== Hapoel Ramat Gan ===
In:

No.	Pos.	Nation	Player
—	GK	ISR	Ron Shushan (from Hapoel Rishon LeZion)
—	GK	ISR	Amit Keren (on loan from Hapoel Be'er Sheva)
—	DF	ISR	Itay Ozeri (from Hapoel Ramat HaSharon)
—	DF	ISR	Raz Nachmias (from Bnei Yehuda)
—	DF	ISR	Idan Cohen (from (United States) Hartford Athletic)
—	DF	ISR	Paz Ben Ari (from Hapoel Petah Tikva)
—	DF	ISR	Yarin Avraham (from Hapoel Kfar Shalem)
—	MF	ISR	Sagi Dror (from Hapoel Petah Tikva)
—	MF	ISR	Eden Ben-Menashe (from Hapoel Herzliya)
—	MF	ISR	Eilon Yerushalmi (from Maccabi Netanya)
—	FW	ISR	Muatasem Issawi (from Ironi Nesher)
—	FW	ISR	Yossi Tuava (from F.C. Dimona)
—	FW	CIV	Zie Yohou Boris (from Hapoel Kfar Shalem)
—	FW	ISR	Roy Korine (on loan from Maccabi Netanya)
—	FW	ISR	Michael Maman (from Maccabi Petah Tikva)

Out:

No.	Pos.	Nation	Player
—	GK	ISR	Tal Bomshtein (to Hapoel Haifa)
—	DF	ISR	Ahmad Shaaban (to Hapoel Acre)
—	DF	ISR	Daniel Mor Yosef (to Hapoel Acre, his player card still belongs to Maccabi Haifa)
—	DF	ISR	Adi Nimni (to Hapoel Rishon LeZion)
—	DF	ISR	Ori Tzaadon (to Hapoel Rishon LeZion)
—	DF	ISR	Israel Rosh (to Ironi Tiberias)
—	DF	ISR	Ovadia Darwish (on loan to Hapoel Ramat HaSharon)
—	DF	ISR	Evgeniy Vinokorov (on loan to Shimshon Kafr Qasim)
—	MF	ISR	Yarden Abuhatzera (to Bnei Yehuda)
—	MF	ISR	Yisrael Zaguri (to Hapoel Umm al-Fahm)
—	MF	ISR	Yam Cohen (to Hapoel Acre, his player card still belongs to Maccabi Haifa)
—	MF	ISR	Yoav Gabizon (on loan to Hapoel Kfar Shalem)
—	MF	ISR	Vladimir Broun (to Hapoel Rishon LeZion)
—	MF	ISR	Eden Ben-Menashe (to F.C. Tira)
—	MF	ISR	Bar Yeruham (to Hapoel Umm al-Fahm)
—	MF	ISR	Dvir Yishay (on loan to Shimshon Tel Aviv)
—	FW	ISR	Michael Maman (to Maccabi Petah Tikva)
—	FW	ISR	Mamoon Qashoua (to Maccabi Netanya)
—	FW	ISR	Shahar Hirsh (Free agent)

=== Hapoel Ramat HaSharon ===
In:

No.	Pos.	Nation	Player
—	GK	ISR	Omer Nir'on (on loan from Bnei Yehuda)
—	DF	ISR	David Tiram (from Hapoel Ra'anana)
—	DF	ISR	Shalev Avitan (on loan from Hapoel Be'er Sheva)
—	DF	ISR	Tom Ahi Mordechai (on loan from Hapoel Tel Aviv)
—	DF	ISR	Eyal Malul (on loan from Beitar Tubruk)
—	MF	ISR	Yarin Sharabi (on loan from Maccabi Netanya)
—	MF	ISR	Roei Har (from Hapoel Acre)
—	MF	ISR	Ilay Tamam (on loan from Hapoel Tel Aviv)
—	MF	ISR	Guy Sivilia (on loan from Hapoel Tel Aviv)
—	MF	ISR	Roei Rabinovich (from Maccabi Tzur Shalom)
—	MF	ISR	Abubakar Barry (from Hapoel Kfar Shalem)
—	MF	ISR	Yossi Mekonen (from Hapoel Rishon LeZion)
—	FW	ISR	Elior Mishali (from Hapoel Petah Tikva)
—	FW	ISR	Ohad Barzilay (from Hapoel Marmorek)

Out:

No.	Pos.	Nation	Player
—	GK	ISR	Sahar Hasson (to F.C. Ashdod)
—	DF	ISR	Itay Ozeri (to Hapoel Ramat Gan)
—	DF	ISR	Yogev Lerman (to F.C. Kafr Qasim)
—	DF	ISR	Dror Nir (to F.C. Kafr Qasim)
—	DF	ISR	Viki Kahlon (to Hapoel Nof HaGalil)
—	MF	ISR	Solomon Daniel (to Hapoel Nof HaGalil)
—	MF	ISR	Omri Shekel (to Sektzia Nes Tziona)
—	MF	ISR	Yarin Sharabi (to Hapoel Acre, his player card still belongs to Maccabi Netanya)
—	MF	ISR	Guy Lerer (on loan to Shimshon Tel Aviv)
—	MF	ISR	Ben Binyamin (to Maccabi Sha'arayim)
—	MF	ISR	Omer Korsia (to Hapoel Petah Tikva)
—	FW	ISR	Aviel Ben Hemo (on loan to Hapoel Hadera)
—	FW	SEN	Romuald Dacosta (to Hapoel Umm al-Fahm)
—	FW	NGR	Benjamin Kuku (to Maccabi Bnei Reineh)

=== Hapoel Rishon LeZion ===
In:

No.	Pos.	Nation	Player
—	GK	ISR	Dor Hevron (on loan from Maccabi Petah Tikva)
—	GK	ISR	Ben Vaitzman (from Hapoel Iksal)
—	DF	ISR	Adi Nimni (from Hapoel Ramat Gan)
—	DF	ISR	Roey Azut (on loan from Hapoel Be'er Sheva)
—	DF	ISR	Omri Luzon (Free transfer)
—	DF	ISR	Triko Gatehun (from Hapoel Kfar Saba)
—	MF	ISR	Vladimir Broun (from Sektzia Nes Tziona)
—	MF	ISR	Tomer Benbenishti (on loan from Maccabi Petah Tikva)
—	MF	ISR	Shay Golan (from Hapoel Petah Tikva)
—	MF	ISR	Prince Thomas (from Hapoel Umm al-Fahm)
—	MF	ISR	Yarden Abuhatzira (from Bnei Yehuda)
—	FW	ISR	Netanel Askias (on loan from Hapoel Be'er Sheva)
—	FW	ISR	Itay Levi (on loan from Beitar Jerusalem)
—	FW	BRA	Mateus Lima (on loan from Hapoel Nof HaGalil)
—	FW	ISR	Yahav Afriat (on loan from Hapoel Kfar Saba)

Out:

No.	Pos.	Nation	Player
—	GK	ISR	Ron Shushan (to Hapoel Ramat Gan)
—	GK	ISR	Yehonatan Shabi (to Hapoel Jerusalem)
—	GK	ISR	Stav Rotschild (to F.C. Holon Yermiyahu)
—	DF	ISR	Gil Sellam (to Maccabi Ahi Nazareth)
—	DF	ISR	Osher Amos (to Hapoel Kfar Shalem)
—	MF	ISR	Samir Farhud (to Maccabi Bnei Reineh, his player card still belongs to Hapoel Nof HaGalil)
—	MF	ISR	Mohammed Abu Shaker (to Hapoel Umm al-Fahm)
—	MF	ISR	Ilay Tamam (to Hapoel Ramat HaSharon, his player card still belongs to Hapoel Tel Aviv)
—	MF	ISR	Lior Katzav (to Beitar Tel Aviv Bat Yam)
—	MF	ISR	Adir Rotstein (to Hapoel Herzliya)
—	MF	ISR	Yossi Mekonen (to Hapoel Ramat HaSharon)
—	MF	ISR	Moulat Gabra (to Maccabi Herzliya, previously loaned to Maccabi Yavne)
—	MF	ISR	Ben Amsalem (to Hapoel Ashdod)
—	FW	ISR	Yagil Ohana (to Hapoel Acre, his player card still belongs to Hapoel Be'er Sheva)
—	FW	ISR	Eden Shrem (to Maccabi Ironi Ashdod)

=== Hapoel Umm al-Fahm ===
In:

No.	Pos.	Nation	Player
—	GK	ISR	Amer Jabarin (from F.C. Daburiyya)
—	DF	ISR	Amid Mahajna (from F.C. Kafr Qasim)
—	DF	ISR	Yarin Hassan (from (Italy) Bisceglie)
—	DF	ISR	Ohad Elbilia (from Hapoel Acre, his player card still belongs to Hapoel Haifa)
—	DF	BRA	Bianor (from (North Macedonia) Shkupi)
—	DF	ISR	Niv Serdal (from Hapoel Tel Aviv)
—	DF	ISR	Mohamad Mahajna (from Hapoel Iksal)
—	DF	SLE	Alpha Conteh (from (Sierra Leone) Central Parade)
—	MF	ISR	Amir Lavi (from Hapoel Iksal)
—	MF	ISR	Mohammed Abu Shaker (from Hapoel Rishon LeZion)
—	MF	ISR	Yisrael Zaguri (from Hapoel Ramat Gan)
—	MF	ISR	Shalom Edri (from Hapoel Hadera)
—	MF	ISR	Bar Yeruham (from Hapoel Ramat Gan)
—	FW	ISR	Timor Avitan (from Hapoel Iksal)
—	FW	CMR	Yannick Makota (from (Italy) Bisceglie)
—	FW	SEN	Romuald Dacosta (from Hapoel Ramat HaSharon)
—	FW	ISR	Ahmed Rabia (from F.C. Tzeirei Tayibe)
—	FW	ISR	Guy Dahan (on loan from Maccabi Haifa)

Out:

No.	Pos.	Nation	Player
—	GK	ISR	Aviad Miara (to Maccabi Ironi Ashdod)
—	DF	ISR	Yakov Ababa (to Maccabi Bnei Reineh, his player card still belongs to Hapoel Hadera)
—	DF	ISR	Nadav Munis (to Ironi Tiberias)
—	DF	ISR	Ilan Shaulski (to Ironi Tiberias)
—	DF	ISR	Liel Trabelsi (to Hapoel Ashdod)
—	DF	ISR	Malek Mahamid (to Hapoel Bnei Zalafa)
—	DF	ISR	Abdi Farhat (to Maccabi Ahi Nazareth)
—	DF	ISR	Yarin Hassan (Free agent)
—	DF	ISR	Aviv Biton (to Maccabi Tzur Shalom)
—	MF	ISR	David Amzaleg (to F.C. Haifa Robi Shapira)
—	MF	ISR	Shalom Edri (to Maccabi Netanya)
—	MF	ISR	Prince Thomas (to Hapoel Rishon LeZion)
—	MF	ISR	Eilon Elimelech (to Ironi Tiberias)
—	MF	ISR	Rany Hamza (to Bnei Eilat)
—	MF	ISR	Yisrael Zaguri (to Bnei Yehuda)
—	MF	ISR	Atef Musa (to Hapoel Bu'eine)
—	FW	GEO	Levan Kutalia (to Sektzia Nes Tziona)
—	FW	ISR	Dor Moskovich (to F.C. Kafr Qasim)
—	FW	ISR	Mohammed Kalibat (to Hapoel Iksal)
—	FW	ISR	Danny Amer (to Bnei Eilat)

=== Maccabi Ahi Nazareth ===
In:

No.	Pos.	Nation	Player
—	GK	ISR	Sagi Malul (from Hapoel Nof HaGalil)
—	DF	ISR	Gil Sellam (from Hapoel Rishon LeZion)
—	DF	ISR	Itzik Sholmyster (on loan from Hapoel Tel Aviv)
—	DF	ISR	Bar Ivgi (Free transfer)
—	DF	ISR	Fadi Najar (from Hapoel Nof HaGalil)
—	DF	ISR	Abdi Farhat (on loan from Hapoel Tel Aviv)
—	MF	ISR	Ohad Hazut (from Hapoel Kfar Shalem)
—	MF	ISR	Mustafa Gadban (from Ahi Acre)
—	MF	ISR	Tomer Lebanon (from Beitar Tubruk)
—	MF	ISR	Guy Dayan (from Hapoel Nof HaGalil)
—	MF	ISR	Elian Ruhana (from Hapoel Iksal)
—	MF	ISR	Salah Hussein (loan return from Hapoel Kaukab)
—	FW	ISR	Dovev Gabay (from Hapoel Nof HaGalil)

Out:

No.	Pos.	Nation	Player
—	GK	ISR	Gad Amos (to Bnei Sakhnin)
—	DF	ISR	Eyad Hutba (to Maccabi Beni Reineh)
—	DF	ISR	Ofek Fishler (to Hapoel Petah Tikva, previously loaned from Hapoel Haifa)
—	DF	ISR	Benel Edri (to Hapoel Ashdod)
—	DF	ISR	Yarin Dado (to Hapoel Azor)
—	DF	ISR	Mohamed Nkhash (on loan to Hapoel Iksal)
—	DF	ISR	Edmon Azzam (to Hapoel Migdal HaEmek)
—	DF	ISR	Saar Kalderon (to Shimshon Tel Aviv)
—	MF	ISR	Noaf Bazea (to F.C. Ashdod)
—	MF	ISR	Gal Kolani (to Hapoel Acre)
—	MF	ISR	Yarden Cohen (to Hapoel Petah Tikva)
—	MF	GRE	Timis Bardis (to (Albania) KF Egnatia)
—	MF	ISR	Guy Dayan (to Hapoel Qalansawe)
—	MF	ISR	Yousef Mohammed (to Ahva Kafr Manda)
—	MF	ISR	Obeida Abu Rabia (to Ahva Kafr Manda)
—	FW	NGR	Michael Omoh (to (Romania) Academica Clinceni)
—	FW	ISR	Mohamed Khatib (to F.C. Kafr Qasim)

=== Maccabi Bnei Reineh ===
In:

No.	Pos.	Nation	Player
—	GK	ISR	Golan Elkaslasy (on loan from Maccabi Netanya)
—	GK	ISR	Mohammed Abu Nil (on loan from Bnei Sakhnin)
—	DF	ISR	Namir Aga (from Hapoel Kaukab)
—	DF	ISR	Hassan Hilo (from Bnei Sakhnin)
—	DF	ISR	Eyad Hutba (from Maccabi Ahi Nazareth)
—	DF	ISR	Yakov Ababa (on loan from Hapoel Hadera)
—	DF	ISR	Bar Ivgi (to Ironi Tiberias)
—	MF	ISR	Matanel Tadesa (from F.C. Tira)
—	MF	ISR	Samir Farhud (on loan from Hapoel Nof HaGalil)
—	MF	GHA	Issac Nortey (from (Latvia) BFC Daugavpils)
—	MF	ISR	Yaniv Brik (from Hapoel Iksal)
—	FW	NGR	Benjamin Kuku (from Hapoel Ramat HaSharon)
—	FW	BRA	Julio César (from Hapoel Iksal)
—	FW	ISR	Loai Halaf (from Ironi Nesher)

Out:

No.	Pos.	Nation	Player
—	DF	ISR	Gal Barel (to Hapoel Qalansawe)
—	DF	ISR	Sharon Levi (to Ironi Tiberias)
—	MF	ISR	Aviran Turgeman (to Ironi Tiberias)
—	MF	ISR	Amir Abu Nil (to Ihud Bnei Shefa-'Amr)
—	MF	ISR	Nadav Mashiah (to Hapoel Bnei Lod)
—	FW	ISR	Osama Shaaban (to Hapoel Kaukab)
—	FW	ISR	Tamer Tatour (to F.C. Ahva Kafr Manda)
—	FW	ISR	Victor Merey (to F.C. Tzeirei Tayibe)
—	FW	ISR	Saker Shaker (to Maccabi Tzur Shalom)
—	FW	ISR	Tamer Tatour (on loan to F.C. Ahva Kafr Manda)

=== Sektzia Nes Tziona ===
In:

No.	Pos.	Nation	Player
—	GK	ISR	Yossi Ginzburg (from Hapoel Afula)
—	DF	ISR	Daniel Busi (from Shimshon Kafr Qasim)
—	DF	HAI	Djimy Alexis (from (Armenia) Lori)
—	DF	ISR	Kobi Mor (from F.C. Kafr Qasim)
—	DF	ISR	Itay Rotman (from Maccabi Petah Tikva)
—	DF	ISR	Tal Kachila (from Hapoel Hadera)
—	DF	ISR	Liran Cohen (on loan from Hapoel Be'er Sheva)
—	DF	ISR	Yuval Levin (on loan from Ironi Kiryat Shmona)
—	MF	ISR	Omri Shekel (from F.C. Kafr Qasim)
—	MF	ISR	Yarden Sidi (from Hakoah Amidar Ramat Gan)
—	MF	ISR	Ilay Trost (on loan from Hapoel Be'er Sheva)
—	MF	ISR	Or Eiloz (from F.C. Holon Yermiyahu)
—	FW	GEO	Levan Kutalia (from Hapoel Umm al-Fahm)
—	FW	ISR	Dudu Biton (from Sektzia Nes Tziona)
—	FW	ISR	Roy Melika (from Hapoel Kfar Shalem)
—	FW	ISR	Itay Moreno (on loan from Hapoel Acre)
—	FW	ISR	Alomg Shankor (from Hapoel Migdal HaEmek)

Out:

No.	Pos.	Nation	Player
—	GK	ISR	Eliran Gabai (to Hapoel Bu'eine)
—	DF	SRB	Dušan Matović (Retired)
—	DF	ISR	Alaa Jafar (to Ironi Kiryat Shmona)
—	DF	ISR	Ran Vaturi (to Hapoel Petah Tikva)
—	DF	ISR	Liel Biton (to Hapoel Ashdod)
—	MF	ISR	Ido Davidov (to Hapoel Kfar Saba)
—	MF	ISR	Dor Galili (to Hapoel Afula)
—	MF	ISR	Saher Taji (to Hapoel Kfar Saba)
—	FW	ISR	Walid Darwish (to Hapoel Kfar Saba)
—	FW	ISR	Eli Elbaz (to Hapoel Ashdod)
