= 2017–18 Liga Alef =

Liga Alef
- Season: 2017–18
- Champions: Hapoel Iksal; Sektzia Ness Ziona

The 2017–18 Liga Alef season was the 9th season as third tier since its re-alignment in 2009 and the 76th season of third-tier football in Israel.

== Changes from last season ==
=== Team changes ===
- Hapoel Hadera and Hapoel Marmorek were promoted to Liga Leumit; Hapoel Jerusalem (to North division) and Maccabi Sha'arayim (to South division) were relegated from Liga Leumit.
- F.C. Tzeirei Kafr Kanna were relegated to Liga Bet from North division, along with F.C. Karmiel Safed, who folded during the season. The two clubs were replaced by Hapoel Shefa-'Amr and Hapoel Umm al-Fahm, which were promoted to the North division from Liga Bet.
- F.C. Bnei Jaffa Ortodoxim and F.C. Shikun HaMizrah were relegated to Liga Bet from South division and were replaced by Hapoel Tzafririm Holon Yaniv and Nordia Jerusalem which were promoted to the South division from Liga Bet. During the summer, the merge between Hapoel Holon Yaniv and Hapoel Tzafririm Holon collapsed, leading Tzafririm Holon to re-register to Liga Gimel, while Hapoel Holon took the merged club's place in Liga Alef, playing under the name F.C. Holon Yermiyahu.

== North Division ==
Liga Alef North
- Season: 2017–18
- Champions: Hapoel Iksal
- Matches played: 233
- Goals scored: 644 (2.76 per match)
- Top goalscorer: Moti Malka (Hapoel Kafr Kana) (17)

Pos	Team	Pld	W	D	L	GF	GA	GD	Pts	Qualification or relegation
1	Hapoel Iksal	30	19	6	5	70	34	+36	63	Promotion to Liga Leumit
2	Hapoel Umm al-Fahm	30	16	10	4	50	20	+30	58	Promotion Playoffs
3	Hapoel Herzliya	30	16	9	5	53	21	+32	57	Promotion Playoffs
4	F.C. Haifa Robi Shapira	30	15	9	6	49	24	+25	54	Promotion Playoffs
5	Ironi Tiberias	30	15	6	9	56	26	+30	51	Promotion Playoffs
6	Hapoel Jerusalem	30	12	12	6	39	22	+17	48	
7	Hapoel Shefa-'Amr	30	14	3	13	47	50	−3	45	
8	Hapoel Baqa al-Gharbiyye	30	11	9	10	33	38	−5	42	
9	Maccabi Ironi Kiryat Ata	30	11	7	12	34	29	+5	40	
10	F.C. Tira	30	10	10	10	38	43	−5	40	
11	Maccabi Tzur Shalom	30	10	6	14	42	42	0	36	
12	Hapoel Asi Gilboa	30	9	9	12	37	42	−5	36	
13	Hapoel Kafr Kanna	30	8	10	12	45	48	−3	34	
14	Hapoel Migdal HaEmek	30	7	9	14	35	52	−17	30	Relegation Playoffs
15	Hapoel Beit She'an	30	4	4	22	23	73	−50	16	Relegation to Liga Bet
16	Maccabi Daliyat al-Karmel (Note: On 1 April 2018 Maccabi Daliyat al-Karmel announced its resignation from the league. As the club had three matches to play, these matches (against Ironi Tiberias, Hapoel Jerusalem and F.C. Haifa) were given to its opponents as a walkover.)	30	3	1	26	15	102	−87	10	Relegation to Liga Bet

Updated to match(es) played on 29 April 2018. Source: Liga Alef North IFA (in Hebrew)
Rules for classification: 1) points; 2) goal difference; 3) number of wins; 4) goals scored; 5) head to head; 6)deciding match.

=== Results ===
Home \ Away	HRS	TRA	ASI	IBG	HBS	HHZ	HIX	HJR	HKK	HME	HSF	HUF	IRT	MDK	MKA	MZS
F.C. Haifa Robi Shapira	—	0–0	1–1	0–0	2–0	1–2	4–1	1–2	2–2	3–1	3–0	2–0	1–1	3–0 (Note: The match finished with a 2–1 win to F.C. Haifa. As Maccabi Daliyat al-Karmel fielded an ineligible player, the result was set to 3–0 to F.C. Haifa.)	2–1	3–1
F.C. Tira	0–0	—	2–1	0–0	3–1	1–0	4–3	0–1	1–5	0–0	0–0	0–3	0–4	1–0	2–5	2–0
Hapoel Asi Gilboa	0–1	0–5	—	3–4	1–1	1–0	0–4	0–0	4–2	3–0	3–0	1–1	1–2	3–1	1–1	1–0
Hapoel Baqa al-Gharbiyye	1–1	1–1	1–0	—	1–0	1–1	2–2	3–2	0–3	3–1	1–2	0–2	0–2	0–1	1–0	2–0
Hapoel Beit She'an	1–6	3–0 (Note: The match finished with a 1–1 draw. As F.C. Tira fielded an ineligible player, the match was given to Hapoel Beit She'an.)	1–1	1–2	—	0–0	1–3	0–3	0–1	3–1	2–3	1–5	0–2	2–0	0–4	1–4
Hapoel Herzliya	2–1	2–1	2–3	5–0	1–0	—	1–2	0–0	0–2	2–0	3–0	1–1	2–0	7–0	2–2	2–0
Hapoel Iksal	0–0	3–2	2–0	5–1	3–0	1–4	—	1–0	4–0	1–0	0–1	2–1	2–1	2–1	4–1	2–0
Hapoel Jerusalem	0–3	1–0	0–0	1–0	3–0	1–1	1–1	—	1–1	3–1	1–3	0–1	1–1	3–0	1–0	2–0
Hapoel Kafr Kanna	2–2	0–0	0–3	0–0	4–1	1–1	1–1	0–0	—	3–4	2–4	0–2	0–1	2–1	0–1	3–1
Hapoel Migdal HaEmek	0–1	2–2	2–0	2–1	1–1	1–3	1–3	0–0	4–3	—	1–1	0–2	2–1	4–0	0–0	2–2
Hapoel Shefa-'Amr	1–0	3–4	1–1	1–0	8–1	1–2	0–2	0–4	3–2	4–1	—	0–2	0–3	4–2	1–0	3–1
Hapoel Umm al-Fahm	0–2	0–0	0–0	0–0	3–0	0–0	0–0	3–1	2–2	3–0	3–0	—	2–1	1–0	1–0	5–2
Ironi Tiberias	4–0	0–0	2–0	2–2	4–1	0–1	2–3	1–1	3–0	0–1	4–1	2–2	—	5–0	1–2	0–1
Maccabi Daliyat al-Karmel	0–3	2–6	0–4	0–3	1–0	0–3	0–10	0–5	0–4	3–3	1–0	1–4	0–3	—	1–4	0–3
Maccabi Ironi Kiryat Ata	1–0	0–1	3–0	0–1	0–1	0–0	2–0	0–0	2–0	0–0	0–2	2–1	0–2	2–0	—	1–1
Maccabi Tzur Shalom	0–1	3–0	3–1	0–2	3–0	0–3	3–3	1–1	0–0	1–0	1–0	0–0	0–2	8–0	3–0	—

Updated to match(es) played on 29 April 2018. Source: Liga Leumit IFA
Legend: Blue = home team win; Red = away team win.

=== Positions by round ===
The table lists the positions of teams after each week of matches. In order to preserve chronological evolvements, any postponed matches are not included to the round at which they were originally scheduled, but added to the full round they were played immediately afterwards. For example, if a match is scheduled for matchday 13, but then postponed and played between days 16 and 17, it will be added to the standings for day 17.

Team ╲ Round	1	2	3	4	5	6	7	8	9	10	11	12	13	14	15	16	17	18	19	20	21	22	23	24	25	26	27	28	29	30
Hapoel Iksal	3	2	1	4	4	4	3	3	2	3	2	2	2	2	2	2	2	1	1	1	1	1	1	1	1	1	1	1	1	1
Hapoel Umm al-Fahm	13	8	7	5	6	5	5	4	5	4	5	5	5	5	4	4	4	4	4	4	3	2	2	2	2	2	3	2	2	2
Hapoel Herzliya	3	4	2	2	3	3	4	6	4	2	3	4	4	4	3	3	3	3	2	3	2	3	3	3	3	3	2	4	3	3
F.C. Haifa Robi Shapira	3	3	4	3	2	2	2	2	1	1	1	1	1	1	1	1	1	2	3	2	4	4	4	4	4	4	4	3	4	4
Ironi Tiberias	13	14	11	6	7	8	6	5	6	6	4	3	3	3	5	5	5	7	7	6	6	6	5	6	6	5	6	6	5	5
Hapoerl Jerusalem	8	12	14	13	13	10	13	8	7	8	8	7	7	6	6	6	6	5	5	5	5	5	6	5	5	6	5	5	6	6
Hapoel Shefa-'Amr	10	15	13	14	11	7	9	11	15	12	10	11	9	8	7	7	8	6	8	9	9	11	8	8	9	10	9	9	7	7
Hapoel Baqa al-Gharbiyye	6	8	10	8	9	11	10	7	8	9	7	9	10	11	11	9	9	9	9	8	7	7	7	7	7	7	7	7	8	8
Maccabi Ironi Kiryat Ata	8	13	15	15	15	13	14	14	12	14	16	13	14	14	13	14	13	14	13	12	11	9	10	10	8	8	8	8	9	9
F.C. Tira	16	16	16	16	16	16	16	16	16	16	14	10	12	12	14	13	12	12	10	11	13	12	13	13	12	13	12	10	10	10
Maccabi Tzur Shalom	13	5	12	10	14	15	12	12	11	7	9	8	8	9	9	10	11	11	12	13	12	13	12	12	11	12	11	12	11	11
Hapoel Asi Gilboa	10	5	6	9	5	9	11	13	14	15	11	14	11	10	10	11	10	10	11	10	10	10	11	11	13	11	13	13	12	12
Hapoel Kafr Kanna	1	1	3	1	1	1	1	1	3	5	6	6	6	7	8	8	7	8	6	7	8	8	9	9	10	9	10	11	13	13
Hapoel Migdal HaEmek	12	10	8	12	12	14	15	15	13	10	11	12	13	13	12	12	14	13	14	14	14	14	14	14	14	14	14	14	14	14
Hapoel Beit She'an	2	5	5	7	10	12	8	9	9	11	13	15	15	15	15	15	15	15	15	15	15	15	15	15	15	15	15	15	15	15
Maccabi Daliyat al-Karmel	6	11	9	11	8	6	7	10	10	13	15	16	16	16	16	16	16	16	16	16	16	16	16	16	16	16	16	16	16	16

Source: IFA

== South Division ==
Liga Alef South
- Season: 2017–18
- Champions: Sektzia Ness Ziona
- Matches played: 240
- Goals scored: 622 (2.59 per match)
- Top goalscorer: Yossi Asayag (Sektzia Ness Ziona) (30)

Pos	Team	Pld	W	D	L	GF	GA	GD	Pts	Qualification or relegation
1	Sektzia Ness Ziona	30	24	1	5	78	21	+57	73	Promotion to Liga Leumit
2	Maccabi Yavne	30	17	6	7	57	37	+20	57	Promotion Playoffs
3	Maccabi Jaffa Kabilio	30	13	12	5	40	27	+13	51	Promotion Playoffs
4	Nordia Jerusalem	30	13	10	7	35	26	+9	49	Promotion Playoffs
5	F.C. Holon Yermiyahu	30	11	13	6	38	21	+17	46	Promotion Playoffs
6	Hapoel Bik'at HaYarden	30	12	8	10	49	37	+12	44	
7	F.C. Kafr Qasim	30	11	11	8	36	25	+11	44	
8	Hapoel Kfar Shalem	30	12	8	10	37	43	−6	44	
9	Hapoel Azor	30	10	10	10	23	25	−2	40	
10	Hakoah Amidar Ramat Gan	30	10	8	12	38	44	−6	38	
11	Maccabi Sha'arayim	30	10	7	13	32	39	−7	37	
12	Beitar Kfar Saba	30	9	10	11	33	41	−8	37	
13	Maccabi Kiryat Gat	30	8	11	11	49	46	+3	35	
14	Hapoel Mahane Yehuda	30	8	8	14	30	44	−14	32	Relegation Playoffs
15	F.C. Dimona	30	7	6	17	31	60	−29	27	Relegation to Liga Bet
16	Hapoel Hod HaSharon	30	0	1	29	16	86	−70	1	Relegation to Liga Bet

Updated to match(es) played on 27 April 2017. Source: Liga Alef South IFA (in Hebrew)
Rules for classification: 1) points; 2) goal difference; 3) number of wins; 4) goals scored; 5) head to head; 6)deciding match.

=== Results ===
Home \ Away	BKS	DMN	HHL	KQS	KRG	HAZ	HBY	HHH	HKS	HMY	MJK	IKG	MSH	MYV	NJR	SNZ
Beitar Kfar Saba	—	1–2	1–0	0–0	0–4	1–0	0–3	4–2	1–3	0–2	0–0	4–1	3–0	2–2	0–0	0–5
F.C. Dimona	1–1	—	1–4	1–4	3–5	1–2	2–4	3–1	0–0	1–1	0–3	1–1	1–2	1–0	2–0	0–5
F.C. Holon Yermiyahu	1–1	2–1	—	0–0	0–0	0–1	1–0	3–1	2–0	0–0	0–3	0–0	2–0	2–0	0–0	1–2
F.C. Kafr Qasim	2–0	0–0	0–1	—	0–2	4–1	1–0	5–0	1–3	3–0	1–1	1–3	1–1	1–0	1–0	1–2
Hakoah Amidar Ramat Gan	0–2	3–0	0–0	1–1	—	2–0	1–1	2–0	1–2	2–0	1–1	1–1	1–1	1–2	0–1	0–5
Hapoel Azor	1–1	1–0	0–0	0–0	2–0	—	0–0	1–0	1–0	2–3	1–1	0–0	0–1	2–2	0–1	1–0
Hapoel Bik'at HaYarden	2–1	1–1	1–1	1–0	7–0	2–0	—	3–1	2–2	3–1	0–3	2–0	2–0	0–1	2–1	3–2
Hapoel Hod HaSharon	0–2	0–2	1–9	1–2	1–3	0–1	2–2	—	1–2	1–2	0–1	0–2	0–3	1–4	1–2	0–2
Hapoel Kfar Shalem	2–1	2–0	1–5	0–1	1–0	1–0	3–3	2–0	—	0–0	1–0	1–1	0–2	1–4	0–2	0–2
Hapoel Mahane Yehuda	0–2	4–1	0–1	0–0	0–0	0–2	2–0	3–0	2–5	—	0–0	0–4	0–2	0–3	2–0	1–2
Maccabi Jaffa Kabilio	0–2	1–0	0–0	2–0	1–3	1–0	1–1	5–1	3–3	1–1	—	2–2	1–0	1–1	0–0	0–3
Maccabi Kiryat Gat	2–2	0–3	2–2	1–1	2–3	0–1	1–0	3–0	1–1	3–0	1–2	—	1–4	0–1	0–0	1–3
Maccabi Sha'arayim	1–1	2–0	1–1	0–0	2–1	1–1	2–0	2–0	0–1	1–4	1–2	1–4	—	0–2	0–1	0–1
Maccabi Yavne	3–0	1–3	0–0	2–1	3–0	2–2	3–2	4–0	3–0	3–1	4–2	0–7	3–1	—	2–2	0–1
Nordia Jerusalem	2–0	5–0	1–0	2–2	1–0	0–0	2–1	3–1	0–0	1–1	0–1	3–2	1–1	0–1	—	1–4
Sektzia Ness Ziona	0–0	4–0	3–0	0–2	4–1	1–0	2–1	4–0	4–0	1–0	0–1	7–3	4–0	3–1	2–3	—

Updated to match(es) played on 12 January 2018. Source: Liga Leumit IFA
Legend: Blue = home team win; Red = away team win.

=== Positions by round ===
The table lists the positions of teams after each week of matches. In order to preserve chronological evolvements, any postponed matches are not included to the round at which they were originally scheduled, but added to the full round they were played immediately afterwards. For example, if a match is scheduled for matchday 13, but then postponed and played between days 16 and 17, it will be added to the standings for day 17.

Team ╲ Round	1	2	3	4	5	6	7	8	9	10	11	12	13	14	15	16	17	18	19	20	21	22	23	24	25	26	27	28	29	30
Sektzia Ness Ziona	4	1	1	1	1	1	1	1	1	1	1	1	1	1	1	1	1	1	1	1	1	1	1	1	1	1	1	1	1	1
Maccabi Yavne	5	3	2	2	2	2	2	2	2	2	2	2	2	2	2	2	2	2	2	2	2	2	2	2	2	2	2	2	2	2
Maccabi Kabilio Jaffa	14	13	15	11	12	9	10	8	10	8	6	4	3	4	5	6	4	4	4	5	5	5	4	4	4	4	3	3	3	3
Nordia Jerusalem	5	5	3	4	7	12	14	15	14	13	11	10	10	9	9	8	7	8	9	6	6	6	6	6	5	6	5	5	4	4
F.C. Holon Yermiyahu	5	11	12	6	3	4	3	5	8	10	8	5	5	5	4	3	3	3	3	3	3	3	3	3	3	3	4	4	5	5
Hapoel Bika't HaYarden	13	7	11	15	9	14	15	11	12	11	12	12	11	8	7	7	8	6	7	8	9	7	9	7	8	9	8	8	8	6
F.C. Kafr Qasim	1	2	6	8	4	5	4	4	3	4	4	7	8	10	10	9	9	9	6	7	8	10	8	9	9	8	7	7	6	7
Hapoel Kfar Shalem	5	15	10	10	5	3	7	9	7	9	7	6	7	7	6	5	6	7	8	9	7	8	11	8	7	5	6	6	7	8
Hapoel Azor	5	10	5	7	11	11	9	7	6	3	5	8	6	6	8	11	12	10	11	11	10	12	10	11	11	10	10	11	10	9
Hakoah Amidar Ramat Gan	5	12	7	3	6	8	6	6	4	5	9	9	12	12	12	10	11	12	10	12	11	11	12	12	10	12	11	9	9	10
Maccabi Sha'arayim	2	6	4	5	8	13	11	12	9	7	10	11	9	11	11	12	14	13	13	10	12	9	7	10	12	11	12	12	12	11
Beitar Kfar Saba	3	8	13	13	14	7	5	3	5	6	3	3	4	3	3	4	5	5	5	4	4	4	5	5	6	7	9	10	11	12
Maccabi Kiryat Gat	15	9	9	9	10	10	12	13	11	12	15	15	15	14	15	13	10	11	12	13	13	13	13	13	13	13	13	13	13	13
Hapoel Mahane Yehuda	5	13	14	12	13	6	8	10	13	15	13	13	13	15	13	14	13	14	14	14	14	14	14	14	14	14	14	14	14	14
F.C. Dimona	5	4	8	14	15	15	13	14	15	14	14	14	14	13	14	15	15	15	15	15	15	15	15	15	15	15	15	15	15	15
Hapoel Hod HaSharon	16	16	16	16	16	16	16	16	16	16	16	16	16	16	16	16	16	16	16	16	16	16	16	16	16	16	16	16	16	16

Source: IFA

== Promotion play-offs ==
Regional semi-finals
N2	Hapoel Umm al-Fahm	1
N5	Ironi Tiberias	2
North division
N3	Hapoel Herzliya	3
N4	F.C. Haifa Robi Shapira	0
S2	Maccabi Yavne	3
S5	F.C. Holon Yermiyahu	0
South division
S3	Maccabi Kabilio Jaffa	2
S4	Nordia Jerusalem	1

Regional final
N5	Ironi Tiberias	3 (8)
N2	Hapoel Herzliya	3 (7)
S2	Maccabi Yavne	1 (2)
S3	Maccabi Kabilio Jaffa	1 (4)

Final
N5	Ironi Tiberias	1 (3)
S3	Maccabi Kabilio Jaffa	1 (1)

=== Test matches ===
25 May 2018
16:30 UTC+3

Hapoel Kfar Saba	4–2	Ironi Tiberias
Fadida 56'; Nesikovsky 60', 72'; David 90+1'	Report	26' Rothstein; 61' Tza'adon

Levita Stadium
Referee: Or'el Grinfeld

29 May 2018
16:15 UTC+3

Ironi Tiberias	1–1	Hapoel Kfar Saba
Gabai 40'	Report	90' Peretz

Tiberias Municipal Stadium
Referee: Erez Papir

Hapoel Kfar Saba won 5–3 on aggregate and remained in Liga Leumit. Ironi Tiberias remained in Liga Alef.

== Relegation play-offs ==
=== North division ===
6 May 2017
18:00 UTC+3

Hapoel Migdal HaEmek	5–0	Hapoel Bnei Fureidis
Malul 36' (pen.); L. Cohen 67'; Amzaleg 70'; Sofer 76'; Y. Cohen 85'	Report

Ilut Stadium
Referee: Aviad Shiloah

=== South division ===
6 May 2018
18:00 UTC+3

Hapoel Mahane Yehuda	3–1	Ironi Or Yehuda
Mizrahi 35'; Alberman 55'; Levy 90+5'	Report	56' Tamir

Ramat Gan Stadium
Referee: Ro'i Reinschreiber
