= Omer Buaron =

Israeli footballer

Personal information
- Full name: Omer Buaron
- Date of birth: June 27, 1992 (age 34)
- Place of birth: Netanya, Israel
- Position: Forward

Team information
- Current team: Hapoel Beit She'an

Youth career
- Beitar Tubruk

Senior career*
Years	Team	Apps	(Gls)
2010–2011	Beitar Tubruk	1	(0)
2011–2014	Hapoel Herzliya	71	(19)
2014	Hapoel Ramat HaSharon	0	(0)
2014	Hapoel Hadera	7	(2)
2014–2015	Hapoel Beit She'an	21	(11)
2015–2016	Maccabi Netanya	3	(0)
2016	Ironi Nesher	15	(2)
2016–2017	F.C. Haifa Robi Shapira	30	(11)
2017–2018	Hapoel Iksal	30	(11)
2018–2019	Beitar Tel Aviv Ramla	31	(10)
2019–2020	Hapoel Petah Tikva	33	(9)
2020–2021	Hapoel Ramat Gan	18	(0)
2021	Hapoel Acre	16	(0)
2021	Bnei Yehuda	3	(0)
2021–2022	Hapoel Kfar Saba	27	(6)
2022	Hapoel Ra'anana	12	(4)
2022–2023	Hapoel Kfar Shalem	15	(8)
2023	Ironi Tiberias	4	(0)
2023–2024	Hapoel Kfar Shalem	23	(9)
2024	Tzeirei Umm al-Fahm	4	(4)
2024–2025	Maccabi Yavne	18	(0)
2025–2026	Tzeirei Umm al-Fahm	4	(0)
2026–	Hapoel Beit She'an	1	(0)
- * Club domestic league appearances and goals as of 13 May 2026

Omer Buaron (Hebrew: עומר בוארון; born 27 June 1992) is an Israeli footballer who plays for Hapoel Beit She'an.
