= Naor Sabag =

Israeli footballer

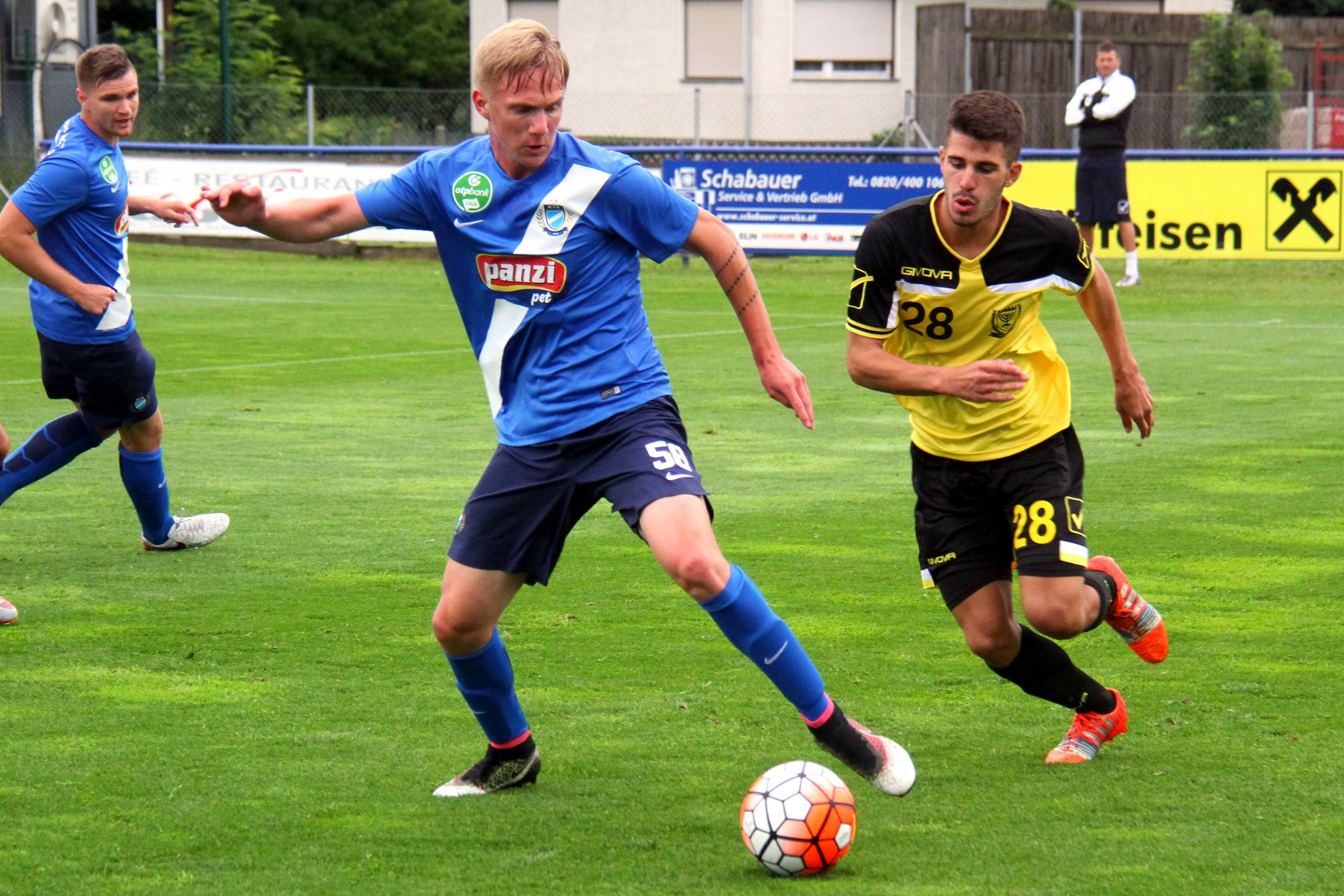

Personal information
- Date of birth: 23 May 1993 (age 33)
- Place of birth: Be'er Sheva, Israel
- Height: 1.84 m (6 ft 1/2 in)
- Position: Midfielder

Team information
- Current team: Hapoel Haifa
- Number: 55

Youth career
- 2004–2008: Hapoel Be'er Sheva
- 2008–2013: Beitar Jerusalem

Senior career*
Years	Team	Apps	(Gls)
2013–2018	Beitar Jerusalem	0	(0)
2013–2014	→ Hakoah Amidar Ramat Gan	8	(0)
2014–2016	→ Hapoel Katamon	61	(5)
2016–2017	→ Hapoel Bik'at HaYarden	28	(5)
2017–2018	→ Sektzia Ness Ziona	28	(4)
2018–2019	Sektzia Ness Ziona	31	(5)
2019–2020	Hapoel Be'er Sheva	26	(1)
2020–2021	Maccabi Petah Tikva	27	(1)
2021–2023	FC Ashdod	61	(2)
2023–	Hapoel Haifa	90	(4)
- * Club domestic league appearances and goals as of 24 June 2026

Naor Sabag (Hebrew: נאור סבג; born 23 May 1993) is an Israeli footballer who plays as a midfielder for Hapoel Haifa from the Israeli Premier League.

== Career ==
On May 29, 2019, Sabag signed Hapoel Be'er Sheva for three years. On July 11, Sabag made his debut in the 1–1 draw against Laçi as part of the 2019–20 UEFA Europa League. a week later in the interplay, he made his score the goal and helped his team qualify to the Second qualifying round. On November 3, Sabag scored his first goal in the Israeli Premier League in a 2–0 win over Maccabi Netanya at Turner Stadium. On July 13, 2020, Sabag won the Israel State Cup after a 2–0 victory against Maccabi Petah Tikva. In 2020, he was transferred from Hapoel Be'er Sheva to Maccabi Petah Tikva.

== Career statistics ==
As of 1 June 2026

Club	Season	League	League		Cup		League Cup		Europe		Other		Total	
Club	Season	League	Apps	Goals	Apps	Goals	Apps	Goals	Apps	Goals	Apps	Goals	Apps	Goals
Hakoah Amidar Ramat Gan	2013–14	Liga Leumit	8	0	0	0	0	0	–	–	0	0	8	0
Hakoah Amidar Ramat Gan	Total		8	0	0	0	0	0	–	–	0	0	8	0
Hapoel Katamon Jerusalem	2014–15	Liga Alef	27	2	1	0	0	0	–	–	0	0	28	2
Hapoel Katamon Jerusalem	2015–16	Liga Leumit	34	3	0	0	4	0	–	–	0	0	38	3
Hapoel Katamon Jerusalem	Total		61	5	1	0	4	0	–	–	0	0	66	5
Hapoel Bik'at HaYarden	2016–17	Liga Alef	28	5	3	1	0	0	–	–	0	0	31	6
Hapoel Bik'at HaYarden	Total		28	5	3	1	0	0	–	–	0	0	31	6
Sektzia Ness Ziona	2017–18	Liga Alef	28	4	5	0	0	0	–	–	0	0	33	4
Sektzia Ness Ziona	2018–19	Liga Leumit	31	5	2	0	2	0	–	–	0	0	35	5
Sektzia Ness Ziona	Total		59	9	7	0	2	0	–	–	0	0	68	9
Hapoel Be'er Sheva	2019–20	Israeli Premier League	25	1	4	0	2	0	5	1	0	0	36	2
Hapoel Be'er Sheva	2020–21	Israeli Premier League	1	0	0	0	0	0	0	0	2	0	3	0
Hapoel Be'er Sheva	Total		26	1	4	0	2	0	5	1	2	0	39	2
Maccabi Petah Tikva	2020–21	Israeli Premier League	27	1	4	0	2	0	5	1	0	0	38	2
Maccabi Petah Tikva	Total		27	1	4	0	2	0	5	1	0	0	38	2
F.C. Ashdod	2021–22	Israeli Premier League	29	1	1	0	2	0	2	0	0	0	34	1
F.C. Ashdod	2022–23	Israeli Premier League	32	1	4	0	4	0	0	0	0	0	40	1
F.C. Ashdod	Total		61	2	5	0	6	0	2	0	0	0	74	2
Hapoel Haifa	2023–24	Israeli Premier League	31	0	1	0	5	0	0	0	0	0	0	
Hapoel Haifa	2024–25	Israeli Premier League	29	1	2	0	5	0	0	0	0	0	36	1
Hapoel Haifa	2025–26	Israeli Premier League	30	3	1	0	4	0	0	0	0	0	35	3
Hapoel Haifa	Total		90	4	4	0	14	0	0	0	0	0	108	4
Career total			350	27	28	1	30	0	10	2	2	0	432	30

== Honours ==
=== Club ===
Hapoel Be'er Sheva

- Israel State Cup: 2019–20
