= Or Zahavi =

Israeli footballer

Personal information
- Date of birth: April 23, 1996 (age 30)
- Place of birth: Jerusalem, Israel
- Height: 1.87 m (6 ft 1 1/2 in)
- Position: Centre-back

Team information
- Current team: Maccabi Kiryat Gat
- Number: 4

Youth career
- 2006–2008: Hapoel Jerusalem
- 2008–2016.: Beitar Jerusalem

Senior career*
Years	Team	Apps	(Gls)
2016–2018	Hapoel Jerusalem	23	(3)
2018–2021	Beitar Jerusalem	62	(2)
2021–2022	Bnei Yehuda	31	(2)
2022–2023	Beitar Jerusalem	42	(2)
2023–2024	Ionikos	26	(0)
2024–2025	Maccabi Jaffa	16	(1)
2026	Ironi Modi'in	20	(0)
2026–	Maccabi Kiryat Gat	6	(0)
- * Club domestic league appearances and goals as of 15 June 2026

Or Zahavi (Hebrew: אור זהבי) is an Israeli professional footballer who plays as a centre-back for Liga Leumit club Maccabi Kiryat Gat.

== Career ==
Zahavi started his career his career in Beitar Jerusalem's youth team. In Summer 2016 signed in Hapoel Jerusalem. On 18 November 2016, he made his debut in the 0–3 loss to Hapoel Acre.

In summer 2018 returned to Beitar Jerusalem. On 12 July 2018, made his European debut in the 0–0 draw against Chikhura Sachkhere. On 14 March 2019, signed for more 4 years in Beitar.

== Career statistics ==
As of 1 June 2022

Club	Season	League			State Cup		Toto Cup		Continental		Other		Total	
Club	Season	Division	Apps	Goals	Apps	Goals	Apps	Goals	Apps	Goals	Apps	Goals	Apps	Goals
Hapoel Jerusalem	2016–17	Liga Leumit	1	0	2	0	0	0	0	0	0	0	3	0
Hapoel Jerusalem	2017–18	Liga Alef	22	3	1	0	0	0	0	0	0	0	23	3
Hapoel Jerusalem	Total		23	3	3	0	0	0	0	0	0	0	26	3
Beitar Jerusalem	2018–19	Israeli Premier League	23	1	1	0	0	0	2	0	1	0	27	1
Beitar Jerusalem	2019–20	Israeli Premier League	19	1	3	0	6	0	0	0	0	0	28	1
Beitar Jerusalem	2020–21	Israeli Premier League	20	0	1	0	0	0	1	0	0	0	22	0
Beitar Jerusalem	Total		62	2	5	0	6	0	3	0	0	0	77	2
Bnei Yehuda	2021–22	Liga Leumit	31	2	4	1	0	0	0	0	0	0	35	3
Bnei Yehuda	Total		31	2	4	1	0	0	0	0	0	0	35	3
Beitar Jerusalem	2022–23	Israeli Premier League	11	0	2	0	4	0	0	0	0	0	17	0
Beitar Jerusalem	Total		11	0	2	0	4	0	0	0	0	0	17	0
Ionikos	2023–24	Super League Greece 2	26	0	0	0	0	0	0	0	0	0	26	0
Ionikos	Total		26	0	0	0	0	0	0	0	0	0	26	0
Maccabi Jaffa	2024–25	Liga Leumit	0	0	0	0	0	0	0	0	0	0	0	0
Maccabi Jaffa	Total		0	0	0	0	0	0	0	0	0	0	0	0
Career total			153	7	14	1	10	0	3	0	1	0	181	8
