= Nir Abergil =

Israeli footballer

Personal information
- Date of birth: 12 September 1990 (age 36)
- Place of birth: Kiryat Ata, Israel
- Position: Forward

Team information
- Current team: Hapoel Migdal HaEmek

Youth career
- –2007: Hapoel Haifa
- 2007–2010: Maccabi Ironi Kiryat Ata

Senior career*
Years	Team	Apps	(Gls)
2010–2013	Maccabi Ironi Kiryat Ata	27	(4)
2012	→ Hapoel Herzliya (loan)	10	(0)
2012–2013	→ Ironi Tiberias (loan)	28	(12)
2013–2015	Maccabi Netanya	33	(4)
2015–2016	Ironi Nesher	9	(1)
2016	Hapoel Ramat HaSharon	1	(0)
2016–2017	Maccabi Ironi Kiryat Ata	20	(5)
2017–2019	Hapoel Iksal	39	(8)
2019	Hapoel Baqa al-Gharbiyye	22	(8)
2019–2021	Hapoel Iksal	46	(7)
2021	Hapoel Ra'anana	5	(0)
2021–2023	Ironi Tiberias	59	(6)
2023–2024	F.C. Kafr Qasim	22	(2)
2024–2025	F.C. Kiryat Yam	17	(2)
2025–	Hapoel Migdal HaEmek	2	(0)
- * Club domestic league appearances and goals as of 1 October 2025

Nir Abergil (Hebrew: ניר אברג'יל; born 12 September 1990) is an Israeli footballer who plays as a forward for Israeli club Hapoel Migdal HaEmek .
