= Shalom Edri =

Israeli footballer

Personal information
- Date of birth: April 7, 1994 (age 32)
- Place of birth: Netanya, Israel
- Position: Attacking midfielder

Team information
- Current team: Hapoel Lod

Youth career
- Beitar Tubruk
- Hapoel Ramat HaSharon

Senior career*
| Years | Team | Apps | (Gls) |
| 2011 | Beitar Tubruk | 3 | (0) |
| 2012–2015 | Hapoel Ramat HaSharon | 32 | (8) |
| 2015–2016 | Maccabi Netanya | 0 | (0) |
| 2016 | Hapoel Ramat HaSharon | 10 | (1) |
| 2016 | Hapoel Kfar Shalem | 6 | (0) |
| 2016–2017 | Tzeirei Kafr Kanna | 14 | (0) |
| 2017 | Ironi Tiberias | 4 | (1) |
| 2017–2019 | F.C. Tira | 49 | (16) |
| 2019–2021 | Beitar Jerusalem | 42 | (1) |
| 2021 | Hapoel Hadera | 7 | (0) |
| 2021 | Hapoel Umm al-Fahm | 0 | (0) |
| 2021 | Maccabi Netanya | 7 | (0) |
| 2021– | F.C. Tira | 87 | (36) |
| 2025– | → Hapoel Lod (loan) | 5 | (1) |
- * Club domestic league appearances and goals as of 30 March 2025

Shalom Edri (Hebrew: שלום אדרי) is an Israeli footballer who plays Hapoel Lod.

== Career ==
Edri started his career in Beitar Tubruk, and played three matches in the senior team. After short time, signed in Hapoel Ramat HaSharon. On 17 November 2012, Edri made his debut in the Israeli Premier League, in the 2–1 win against Maccabi Netanya.

On 27 October 2015, Edri signed in Maccabi Netanya, but after some months returned to Hapoel Ramat HaSharon.

On 29 August 2016, Edri signed in Hapoel Kfar Shalem.

On 6 July 2017, Edri signed in Ironi Tiberias.

On 10 October 2017, Edri signed in F.C. Tira.

On 1 July 2019, Edri returned to the Israeli Premier League when he signed in Beitar Jerusalem.

== Career statistics ==
As of 3 September 2020.

| Club | Season | League | | | State Cup | | Toto Cup | | Continental | | Other | | Total | |
| Club | Season | Division | Apps | Goals | Apps | Goals | Apps | Goals | Apps | Goals | Apps | Goals | Apps | Goals |
|---|---|---|---|---|---|---|---|---|---|---|---|---|---|---|
| Beitar Tubruk | 2011–12 | Liga Gimel | 3 | 0 | 0 | 0 | 0 | 0 | 0 | 0 | 0 | 0 | 3 | 0 |
| Hapoel Ramat HaSharon | 2012–13 | Israeli Premier League | 1 | 0 | 0 | 0 | 2 | 0 | 0 | 0 | 0 | 0 | 3 | 0 |
| Hapoel Ramat HaSharon | 2013–14 | Israeli Premier League | 3 | 0 | 2 | 0 | 0 | 0 | 0 | 0 | 0 | 0 | 5 | 0 |
| Hapoel Ramat HaSharon | 2014–15 | Liga Leumit | 28 | 8 | 1 | 0 | 1 | 0 | 0 | 0 | 0 | 0 | 30 | 8 |
| Hapoel Ramat HaSharon | 2015–16 | Liga Leumit | 10 | 1 | 1 | 0 | 1 | 0 | 0 | 0 | 0 | 0 | 12 | 1 |
| Maccabi Netanya | 2015–16 | Israeli Premier League | 0 | 0 | 0 | 0 | 2 | 0 | 0 | 0 | 0 | 0 | 2 | 0 |
| Hapoel Kfar Shalem | 2016–17 | Liga Alef | 6 | 0 | 1 | 0 | 0 | 0 | 0 | 0 | 0 | 0 | 7 | 0 |
| F.C. Tzeirei Kafr Kanna | 2016–17 | Liga Alef | 14 | 0 | 0 | 0 | 0 | 0 | 0 | 0 | 0 | 0 | 14 | 0 |
| Ironi Tiberias | 2017–18 | Liga Alef | 4 | 1 | 0 | 0 | 0 | 0 | 0 | 0 | 0 | 0 | 4 | 1 |
| F.C. Tira | 2017–18 | Liga Alef | 22 | 7 | 0 | 0 | 0 | 0 | 0 | 0 | 0 | 0 | 22 | 7 |
| F.C. Tira | 2018–19 | Liga Alef | 27 | 9 | 2 | 1 | 0 | 0 | 0 | 0 | 0 | 0 | 29 | 10 |
| Beitar Jerusalem | 2019–20 | Israeli Premier League | 28 | 1 | 3 | 0 | 5 | 2 | 0 | 0 | 0 | 0 | 36 | 3 |
| Beitar Jerusalem | 2020–21 | Israeli Premier League | 14 | 1 | 0 | 0 | 4 | 1 | 1 | 0 | 0 | 0 | 21 | 1 |
| Career total | | | 65 | 5 | 7 | 0 | 6 | 0 | 2 | 0 | 1 | 0 | 81 | 5 |
