= Ilay Tamam =

Israeli footballer

Personal information
- Date of birth: 7 May 2001 (age 25)
- Place of birth: Rishon LeZion, Israel
- Position: Midfielder

Team information
- Current team: F.C. Ashdod
- Number: 10

Youth career
- Hapoel Tel Aviv

Senior career*
Years	Team	Apps	(Gls)
2020–2022	Hapoel Tel Aviv	9	(0)
2021	→ Hapoel Rishon LeZion (loan)	14	(0)
2021–2022	→ Hapoel Petah Tikva (loan)	25	(2)
2022–2023	Hapoel Rishon LeZion	32	(4)
2023–	F.C. Ashdod	70	(5)
- * Club domestic league appearances and goals as of 24 June 2026

Ilay Tamam (Hebrew: אילי טמם; born 7 May 2001) is an Israeli footballer who plays as a midfielder for F.C. Ashdod.

== Career ==
Tamam started his career with Israeli top flight side Hapoel Tel Aviv, where he made 14 appearances and scored 0 goals. On 30 May 2020, Tamam debuted for Hapoel Tel Aviv during a 2–1 win over Maccabi Haifa. In 2021, he was sent on loan to Hapoel Petah Tikva in the Israeli second tier.

On 5 September 2022, Tamam went viral on the internet after celebrating a goal by taking off his shirt, which revealed an image of his recently dead dog.
