= Idan Dahan =

Israeli footballer

Personal information
- Full name: Idan Aharon Dahan
- Date of birth: 7 March 2001 (age 25)
- Place of birth: Ashdod, Israel
- Position: Forward

Team information
- Current team: Maccabi Petah Tikva
- Number: 16

Youth career
- F.C. Ashdod

Senior career*
Years	Team	Apps	(Gls)
2020–2021	F.C. Ashdod	22	(4)
2021–2023	Hapoel Ashdod	45	(5)
2023–2025	Hapoel Jerusalem	29	(3)
2025	F.C. Ashdod	12	(0)
2025	Ironi Tiberias	0	(0)
2025–	Maccabi Petah Tikva	27	(4)
- * Club domestic league appearances and goals as of 24 June 2026

Idan Dahan (Hebrew: עידן דהן; born 7 March 2001) is an Israeli professional football player who plays as a forward for Maccabi Petah Tikva.
