= Hassan Hilu =

Israeli footballer (born 1999)

Personal information
- Full name: Hassan Hilu
- Date of birth: 25 November 1999 (age 26)
- Place of birth: Sakhnin, Israel
- Height: 1.88 m (6 ft 2 in)
- Position: Centre back

Team information
- Current team: Radnički 1923
- Number: 6

Youth career
- Hapoel Sakhnin
- Bnei Sakhnin

Senior career*
Years	Team	Apps	(Gls)
2018–2024	Bnei Sakhnin	104	(2)
2021–2022	→ Maccabi Bnei Reineh (loan)	33	(0)
2024	Júbilo Iwata	9	(0)
2025-2026	Bnei Sakhnin FC	32	(0)
2026-	Radnički 1923	0	(0)

International career
2016–2017	Israel U18	4	(0)
- * Club domestic league appearances and goals as of 18 July 2026

Hassan Hilu (Arabic: حسن الحلو; Hebrew: חסן חילו; born 25 November 1999) is an Israeli professional footballer who plays as a centre-back for Serbian SuperLiga club Radnički 1923.

== Career ==
On 12 August 2018 made his debut in the 1–1 draw against Maccabi Netanya. On 3 May 2019 made his Israeli Premier League debut in the 0–3 loss to Hapoel Tel Aviv.

On 21 June 2021 loaned to the Liga Leumit club Maccabi Bnei Reineh and promoted with the club to the Israeli Premier League for the first time in the history.

On 27 June 2024 signed for the J1 League club Júbilo Iwata.

== Career statistics ==
=== Club ===
As of 26 August 2024.

Club	Season	League			State Cup		Toto Cup		Continental		Other		Total	
Club	Season	Division	Apps	Goals	Apps	Goals	Apps	Goals	Apps	Goals	Apps	Goals	Apps	Goals
Bnei Sakhnin	2018–19	Israeli Premier League	1	0	1	0	1	0	0	0	0	0	3	0
Bnei Sakhnin	2019–20	Liga Leumit	24	1	1	0	5	0	0	0	0	0	30	1
Bnei Sakhnin	2020–21	Israeli Premier League	19	0	2	0	4	0	0	0	0	0	25	0
Bnei Sakhnin	2022–23	Israeli Premier League	29	0	1	0	5	1	0	0	0	0	35	1
Bnei Sakhnin	2023–24	Israeli Premier League	31	1	0	0	4	0	0	0	0	0	35	1
Bnei Sakhnin	Total		104	2	5	0	19	0	0	0	0	0	128	2
Maccabi Bnei Reineh	2021–22	Liga Leumit	33	0	0	0	4	0	0	0	0	0	37	0
Maccabi Bnei Reineh	Total		33	0	0	0	4	0	0	0	0	0	37	0
Júbilo Iwata	2024	J1 League	3	0	0	0	0	0	0	0	0	0	3	0
Júbilo Iwata	Total		3	0	0	0	0	0	0	0	0	0	3	0
Career total			140	2	5	0	23	0	0	0	0	0	168	2
