= Roy Korine =

Israeli footballer

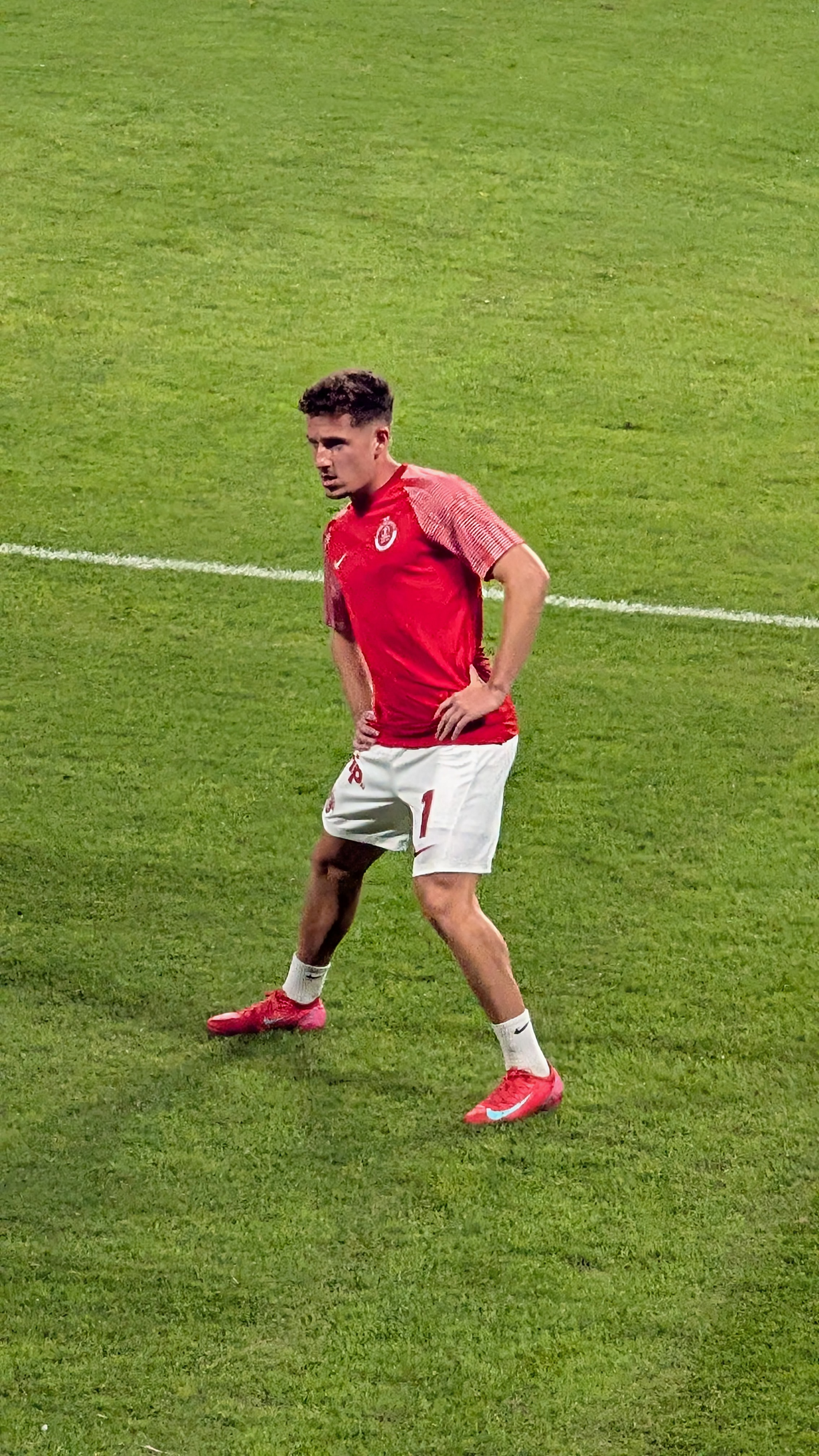

Personal information
- Date of birth: 10 September 2002 (age 24)
- Place of birth: Herzliya, Israel
- Position: Forward

Team information
- Current team: Hapoel Tel Aviv

Senior career*
Years	Team	Apps	(Gls)
2019–2025	Maccabi Netanya	36	(0)
2021–2022	→ Hapoel Ramat Gan	35	(5)
2024	→ Maccabi Petah Tikva	12	(0)
2024–2025	→ Hapoel Tel Aviv (loan)	19	(7)
2025–	Hapoel Tel Aviv	25	(5)

International career^{‡}
2018	Israel U17	3	(0)
2019–2020	Israel U19	4	(0)
- * Club domestic league appearances and goals as of 23 June 2026 ‡ National team caps and goals as of 23:19, 12 April 2020 (UTC)

Roy Korine (Hebrew: רוי קורין; born 10 September 2002) is an Israeli footballer who currently plays as a forward for Hapoel Tel Aviv.

== Early life ==
Korine was born in Herzliya, Israel.

== Career statistics ==
=== Club ===
As of 1 June 2026

Club	Season	League			National Cup		League Cup		Continental		Other		Total	
Club	Season	Division	Apps	Goals	Apps	Goals	Apps	Goals	Apps	Goals	Apps	Goals	Apps	Goals
Maccabi Netanya	2019–20	Israeli Premier League	7	0	0	0	2 (Note: Appearances in the Toto Cup)	0	–		0	0	9	0
Maccabi Netanya	2020–21	Israeli Premier League	15	0	0	0	4	0	–		0	0	19	0
Maccabi Netanya	2022–23	Israeli Premier League	12	0	2	0	0	0	–		0	0	14	0
Maccabi Netanya	2022–23	Israeli Premier League	2	0	0	0	0	0	–		0	0	2	0
Maccabi Netanya	Total		36	0	2	0	6	0	0	0	0	0	42	0
Hapoel Ramat Gan	2021–22	Liga Leumit	35	5	1	0	1	0	–		0	0	37	5
Hapoel Ramat Gan	Total		35	5	1	0	1	0	0	0	0	0	37	5
Maccabi Petah Tikva	2023–24	Israeli Premier League	12	0	0	0	0	0	–		0	0	12	0
Maccabi Petah Tikva	Total		12	0	0	0	0	0	0	0	0	0	12	0
Hapoel Tel Aviv	2024–25 (loan)	Liga Leumit	19	7	5	0	0	0	–		0	0	24	7
Hapoel Tel Aviv	2025–26	Israeli Premier League	25	5	2	2	4	0	–		0	0	31	7
Total		44	12	7	2	4	0	0	0	0	0	55	14	
Career total			127	17	10	2	4	0	0	0	0	0	146	19

== Honours ==
Maccabi Petah Tikva

- Israel State Cup: 2023–24
