= Bentzi Moshel =

Israeli footballer

Personal information
- Full name: Ben Zion Moshel
- Date of birth: July 31, 1993 (age 33)
- Place of birth: Ashdod, Israel
- Position: Midfielder

Team information
- Current team: Hapoel Ashkelon

Youth career
- F.C. Ashdod

Senior career*
Years	Team	Apps	(Gls)
2011–2021	F.C. Ashdod	165	(7)
2021–2022	Hapoel Ashdod	28	(1)
2022–2023	Hapoel Ramat Gan	20	(0)
2023–2024	Hapoel Ashdod	21	(0)
2025	Maccabi Ironi Ashdod	14	(4)
2025–	Hapoel Ashkelon	0	(0)
- * Club domestic league appearances and goals as of 1 July 2025

Ben Zion Moshel (Hebrew: בן ציון מושל; born July 31, 1993) is an Israeli footballer who plays for Hapoel Ashkelon.
