= Roei Zikri =

Israeli footballer

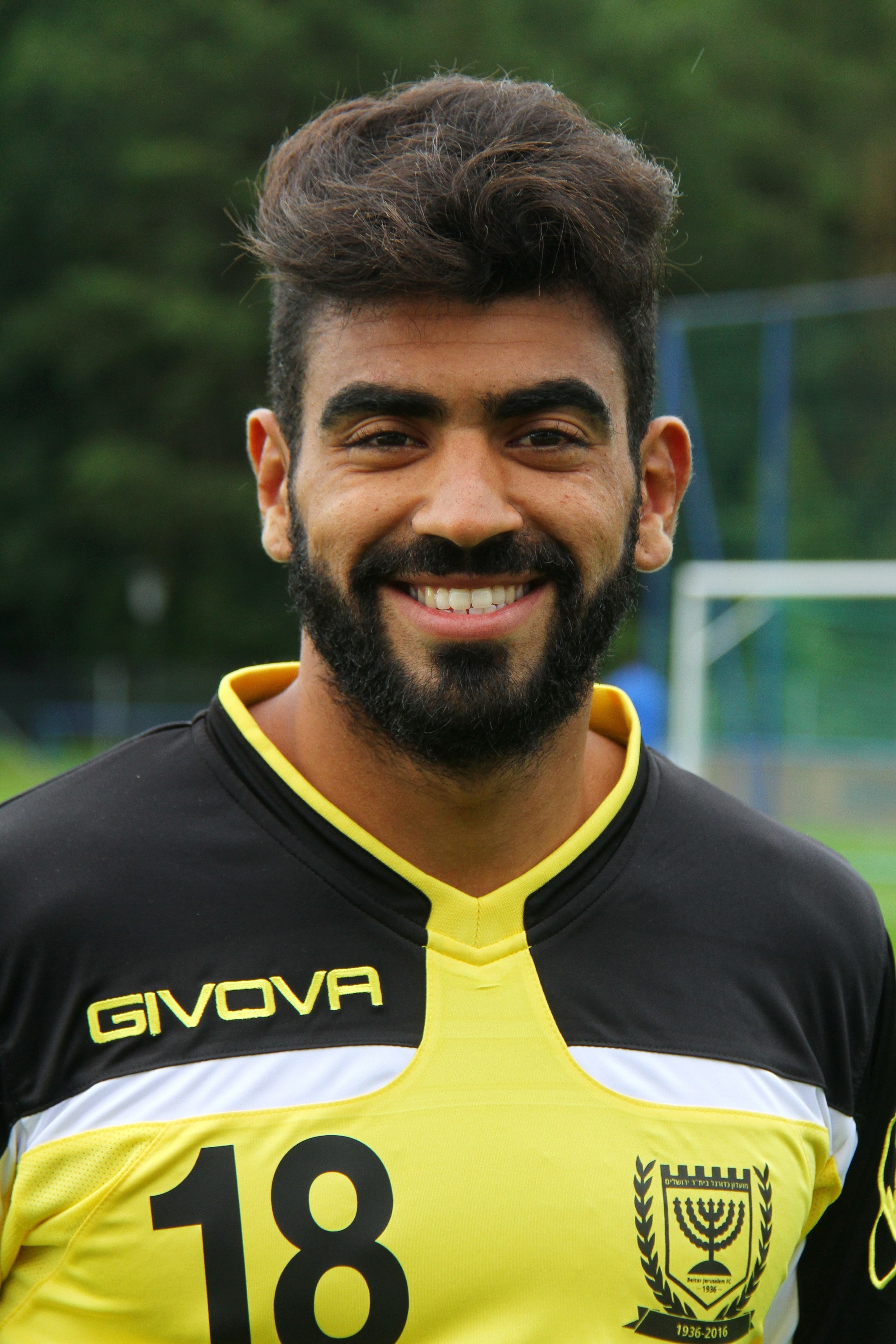
- Zikri with Beitar Jerusalem in 2016

Personal information
- Full name: Roei Zikri
- Date of birth: 13 October 1992 (age 34)
- Place of birth: Herzliya, Israel
- Height: 1.78 m (5 ft 10 in)
- Position: Forward

Team information
- Current team: Hapoel Acre
- Number: 26

Youth career
- Maccabi Herzliya
- Beitar Tubruk

Senior career*
Years	Team	Apps	(Gls)
2011–2012	Ironi Kiryat Shmona	2	(0)
2012–2013	Hapoel Petah Tikva	29	(6)
2013–2017	Beitar Jerusalem	13	(0)
2014–2015	→ Hakoah Amidar Ramat Gan (loan)	32	(3)
2017	Hapoel Rishon LeZion	13	(2)
2017–2018	Hapoel Kfar Saba	16	(13)
2018	→ Hapoel Ra'anana (loan)	12	(2)
2018–2021	Hapoel Tel Aviv	46	(1)
2019–2020	→ Hapoel Hadera (loan)	31	(6)
2021	Hapoel Hadera	0	(0)
2021–2023	Hapoel Petah Tikva	61	(18)
2023–2025	Ironi Kiryat Shmona	63	(12)
2025–2026	Hapoel Haifa	28	(2)
2026	Maccabi Bnei Reineh	3	(0)
2026–	Hapoel Acre	5	(0)
- * Club domestic league appearances and goals as of 24 October 2026

Roei Zikri (Hebrew: רועי זיקרי; born 13 October 1992) is an Israeli professional footballer who plays as a forward for Hapoel Acre.

== Club career ==
=== Ironi Kiryat Shmona ===
Zikri played his debut game for Ironi Kiryat Shmona in February 2012, being substituted on for the last 6 minutes in a 1–1 draw against Hapoel Be'er Sheva in the Israeli Premier League.

=== Hapoel Petah Tikva ===
After being disappointed at only playing two games with Ironi Kiryat Shmona, Zikri signed with Hapoel Petah Tikva for one season, with an option of an extension, in August 2012. In the same month, Zikri made his debut for the club, playing in a 1–1 draw against Hapoel Ra'anana. A week later he scored his debut goal in a 3–2 victory over Maccabi Herzliya.

=== Beitar Jerusalem ===
Zikri signed for four years with Beitar Jerusalem in September 2013. Zikri made his debut for Beitar Jerusalem in October 2013, playing in a 2–0 victory over Hapoel Ramat HaSharon.

=== Hakoah Amidar Ramat Gan ===
On 8 September 2014, Zikri was loaned to Hakoah Amidar Ramat Gan.
