= Triko Gatehun =

Israeli footballer

Personal information
- Full name: Triko Gatehun
- Date of birth: 1 January 1995 (age 31)
- Place of birth: Haifa, Israel
- Positions: Left back; defensive midfielder

Team information
- Current team: Maccabi Kiryat Malakhi

Youth career
- 2006–2013: F.C. Neve Yosef
- 2013–2014: Hapoel Haifa

Senior career*
Years	Team	Apps	(Gls)
2014–2015	Hapoel Haifa	1	(0)
2015–2018	Hapoel Nazareth Illit	7	(0)
2016–2018	→ Ironi Tiberias	51	(4)
2018–2021	Hapoel Kfar Saba	44	(1)
2021–2022	Hapoel Rishon LeZion	9	(0)
2022–2023	Maccabi Jaffa	43	(0)
2023–2024	F.C. Holon Yermiyahu	21	(1)
2024–	Maccabi Kiryat Malakhi	0	(0)

International career
2010	Israel U-16	8	(1)
2011	Israel U-17	9	(0)
- * Club domestic league appearances and goals as of 1 June 2024

Triko Gatehun (Hebrew: טריקו גטהון; born 1 January 1995) is an Israeli football left defender. He currently plays for Maccabi Kiryat Malakhi.

== Career ==
On 9 February 2022 signed the Liga Alef club Maccabi Jaffa. In the end of the season Jaffa promoted to the Liga Leumit, after 12 years in Liga Alef.

== Honours ==
Hapoel Kfar Saba

- Liga Leumit: 2018–19

Maccabi Jaffa

- Liga Alef: 2021–22
