= Itay Rotman =

Israeli footballer

Personal information
- Full name: Itay Rotman
- Date of birth: 16 August 2002 (age 24)
- Place of birth: Ness Ziona, Israel
- Height: 1.82 m (5 ft 11 1/2 in)
- Position: Centre-back

Team information
- Current team: Hapoel Be'er Sheva
- Number: 12

Youth career
- 2011–2016: Sektzia Ness Ziona
- 2016–2021: Maccabi Petah Tikva

Senior career*
Years	Team	Apps	(Gls)
2020–2021	Maccabi Petah Tikva	3	(0)
2021–2024	Sektzia Ness Ziona	59	(5)
2022–2023	→ Hapoel Ramat Gan	15	(1)
2024–2026	Hapoel Petah Tikva	70	(6)
2026–	Hapoel Be'er Sheva	5	(0)

International career^{‡}
2026–	Israel	1	(0)
- * Club domestic league appearances and goals as of 10:46, 19 October 2026 (UTC) ‡ National team caps and goals as of 10:46, 19 October 2026 (UTC)

Itay Rotman (Hebrew: איתי רוטמן; born 16 August 2002) is an Israeli professional footballer who plays as a centre-back for Israeli Premier League club Hapoel Be'er Sheva and Israel national team.

== Early life ==
Rotman was born in Ness Ziona, Israel, to an Ashkenazi Jewish family. His older brother, Liran, is also a professional footballer who plays as a winger for Hapoel Haifa in the Israeli Premier League.

== Club career ==
Hapoel Petah Tikva

Ahead of the 2024–25 season, Rotman signed a one-year contract with Hapoel Petah Tikva. On 8 August 2024, Rotman scored his first goal on his debut for Hapoel Petah Tikva in a 2–1 victory over Maccabi Jaffa in the Toto Cup for the Liga Leumit. The match was held at the Ness Ziona Stadium.

Hapoel Be'er Sheva

On May 28, 2026, Rotman signed with Hapoel Be'er Sheva for three seasons.

== International career ==
In 2019, Rotman received his first call-up to the Israel U18 by head coach Gadi Brumer for a pair of friendly matches against Serbia U18 and Germany U18. However, he did not make an appearance and remained an unused substitute on the bench.

On 28 May 2026, Rotman was called up by head coach Ran Ben Shimon ahead of the friendly match against the Albania national team. On 3 June 2026, Rotman made his debut for the Israel national team, coming on as a substitute in the 87th minute for Stav Lemkin in a 1–0 victory over the Albania national team in a friendly match held at Arena Kombëtare Stadium.
