= Guy Dayan =

Israeli footballer

Personal information
- Full name: Guy Dayan
- Date of birth: August 20, 1986 (age 40)
- Place of birth: Beit She'an, Israel
- Height: 1.76 m (5 ft 9 1/2 in)
- Position: Midfielder

Youth career
- 2002: Hapoel Beit She'an

Senior career*
Years	Team	Apps	(Gls)
2002–2005	Hapoel Beit She'an		
2005–2009	Hapoel Kfar Saba	58	(4)
2009–2010	Maccabi Ahi Nazareth	23	(2)
2010–2011	Hapoel Petah Tikva	31	(4)
2011–2014	Hapoel Acre	86	(8)
2014–2015	Hapoel Petah Tikva	22	(3)
2015–2016	Hapoel Afula	14	(4)
2016	Hapoel Acre	16	(2)
2016–2017	Hapoel Afula	36	(8)
2017–2021	Hapoel Nof HaGalil	124	(35)
2021	Maccabi Ahi Nazareth	0	(0)
2021–2022	Hapoel Qalansawe	25	(6)
2022–2023	Hapoel Nof HaGalil	12	(0)

Managerial career
- 2023–2024: Hapoel Beit She'an (youth)
- 2024–: Hapoel Beit She'an
- * Club domestic league appearances and goals as of 1 June 2023

Guy Dayan (Hebrew: גיא דיין; born August 20, 1986) is a formerIsraeli football player.

== Career ==
Guy Dayan began his career by Hapoel Beit She'an, after that he played for Hapoel Kfar Saba and in 2009 he moved to Maccabi Ahi Nazareth. He spent the 2010–11 season with Hapoel Petah Tikva before joining Hapoel Acre.

== Position ==
He plays as central midfielder, in attacking midfield or defensive midfield.
