= Arnon Tamir =

Israeli footballer

Arnon Tamir ארנון תמיר
Personal information
- Full name: Arnon Tamir
- Date of birth: March 14, 1986 (age 40)
- Place of birth: Mazkeret Batya, Israel
- Position: Midfielder

Team information
- Current team: Ironi Beit Dagan

Senior career*
Years	Team	Apps	(Gls)
2005–2010	Hapoel Marmorek	99	(6)
2010	Maccabi Ironi Bat Yam	1	(0)
2010–2011	Beitar Tel Aviv Ramla	21	(4)
2011–2012	Sektzia Ness Ziona	28	(5)
2012–2013	Maccabi Netanya	3	(0)
2013	Maccabi Yavne	12	(0)
2013–2014	Maccabi Kiryat Gat	13	(0)
2015	Hapoel Marmorek	16	(1)
2015–2016	Shikun HaMizrah	24	(6)
2016	Maccabi Kabilio Jaffa	1	(0)
2016–2017	Shikun HaMizrah	22	(2)
2017–2019	Ironi Or Yehuda	55	(37)
2019–2020	Maccabi Kiryat Malakhi	25	(12)
2020—2021	Ironi Or Yehuda	18	(2)
2021–2022	Ironi Modi'in	14	(6)
2022	Hapoel Bnei Ashdod	8	(2)
2022–2024	Ironi Beit Dagan	49	(10)
- * Club domestic league appearances and goals as of 28 June 2026

Arnon Tamir (Hebrew: ארנון תמיר; born March 14, 1986) is an Israeli footballer who plays for Ironi Beit Dagan.
