= Omer Fadida =

Israeli footballer

Omer Fadida עומר פדידה
Personal information
- Full name: Omer Fadida
- Date of birth: 17 July 1990 (age 36)
- Place of birth: Kfar Saba, Israel
- Height: 1.80 m (5 ft 11 in)
- Positions: Striker; winger

Team information
- Current team: Hapoel 1928 Kfar Saba

Youth career
- Hapoel Kfar Saba

Senior career*
Years	Team	Apps	(Gls)
2010–2013	Hapoel Kfar Saba	88	(15)
2013–2015	Hapoel Tel Aviv	14	(1)
2014–2015	→ Hapoel Kfar Saba (loan)	21	(3)
2015–2021	Hapoel Kfar Saba	168	(44)
2021–2022	Hapoel Hadera	9	(1)
2022	Hapoel Nof HaGalil	10	(2)
2022–2023	Maccabi Petah Tikva	10	(1)
2023	Hapoel Kfar Saba	11	(2)
2023–	Hapoel 1928 Kfar Saba	0	(0)
- * Club domestic league appearances and goals as of 15 June 2023

Omer Fadida (Hebrew: עומר פדידה; born 17 July 1990 in Kfar Saba) is an Israeli footballer who plays as a striker for Liga Gimel club Hapoel 1928 Kfar Saba.

== Career ==
Fadida grew up in Hapoel Kfar Saba and played in the club until 2013, scoring 15 goals in 90 caps.

Fadida signed at Hapoel Tel Aviv in 2013 with his friend from Hapoel Kfar Saba, Avraham Chekol.

On 15 September 2014 returned to Hapoel Kfar Saba.
