= Yossi Asayag =

Israeli footballer

Personal information
- Full name: Yossi Asayag
- Date of birth: August 22, 1988 (age 38)
- Place of birth: Nes Ziona, Israel
- Position: Forward

Youth career
- 2003–2006: Sektzia Ness Ziona

Senior career*
Years	Team	Apps	(Gls)
2006–2011	Sektzia Ness Ziona	112	(34)
2011–2013	Hapoel Ra'anana	57	(21)
2013–2014	Hapoel Ramat Gan	18	(6)
2014	Hapoel Acre	10	(1)
2014–2015	Maccabi Yavne	25	(4)
2015–2016	Hapoel Herzliya	11	(3)
2016–2017	Hapoel Marmorek	27	(15)
2017–2018	Sektzia Ness Ziona	28	(30)
2018–2019	F.C. Kafr Qasim	30	(29)
2019–2020	Nordia Jerusalem	20	(10)
2020–2021	Hapoel Ashdod	20	(6)
2021	Hapoel Petah Tikva	6	(0)
2021–2022	Shimshon Kafr Qasim	12	(4)
2022	F.C. Holon Yermiyahu	12	(2)
- * Club domestic league appearances and goals

Yossi Asayag (Hebrew: יוסי אסייג; born August 22, 1988) is an Israeli football player.

== Honours ==
- Third division (2):
  - 2008–09 (Liga Artzit), 2016–17, 2018–19, 2020–21 (Liga Alef)
