= Hapoel Iksal F.C. =

Israeli football club

Hapoel Imad Iksal
- Full name: Hapoel Iksal Football Club
- Founded: 1963
- Dissolved: 2021
Home colours	Away colours

Hapoel Iksal (Arabic: هبوعيل عماد اكسال, Hebrew: הפועל איכסל) was an Israeli football club based in Iksal.

== History ==
The club played mostly in the lower divisions of Israeli football. In the 1998–99 season, the club finished third in Liga Alef North division and promoted to Liga Artzit, which became the third tier of Israeli football due to the formation of the Israeli Premier League in that season. Hapoel Iksal's spell in Liga Artzit lasted one season, as they finished bottom at the 1999–2000 season with only 2 wins out of 33 matches and relegated to back Liga Alef. In the following season, the club finished bottom in Liga Alef North and suffered subsequent relegation, this time to Liga Bet, the fifth tier of Israeli football at the time.

In the 2007–08 season, the club finished runners-up in Liga Bet North B division and qualified for the Promotion play-offs. However, the club was eventually expelled from the play-offs, following an attempt for match fixing, prior to their match with Beitar Haifa. As a result, the club was punished by 15 points deduction in the following season (which later became 17).

In the 2012–13 season, the club finished third in Liga Bet North B (now as the fourth tier) and qualified once more for the Promotion play-offs. After beating F.C. Tzeirei Tur'an, Maccabi Ahi Iksal and Hapoel Kaukab, they faced Maccabi Kafr Kanna in the decisive promotion/relegation play-offs. After 1–1 draw in 120 minutes, Iksal lost in penalties and remained in Liga Bet.

In the 2014–15 season, the club finished third in Liga Bet North B, and this time had a successful Promotion play-offs. After beating Maccabi Ein Mahil, Hapoel Daliyat al-Karmel and Maccabi Ironi Acre, Hapoel Iksal faced Hapoel Asi Gilboa in the decisive promotion/relegation play-offs. Iksal won 1–0 and were promoted to Liga Alef. In the 2017–18 season Iksal finished 1st and were promoted to Liga Leumit for the first time in the Club history.

In the 2018-19 Liga Leumit season, the club finished last and were relegated back to Liga Alef, after winning 7 matches and 31 points in 37 matches.

In 2020 the club were promoted back to Liga Leumit after the 2019-20 Liga Alef season was stopped abruptly, before the league finished, due to the COVID-19 pandemic in Israel.

Ahead of the 2021-22 Liga Leumit season, Iksal was not authorized by the budget supervision authority to play in Liga Leumit, and was relegated to Liga Alef.

On March 29, 2022, the team suffered the biggest defeat in its history, 2–13 to Maccabi Kafr Kanna. The club went on to be relegated to Liga Bet. On April 6 the football association court ruled that the club's operations will be suspended until 31 July 2022. During the 2022–23 season, the club was dissolved.

== Honours ==
=== League ===
Honour	No.	Years
Fifth tier	1	1982–83
Third tier	1	2017–18

=== Cups ===
Honour	No.	Years
Liga Bet divisional State Cup	1	2011–12
