= F.C. Haifa =

Israeli football club

- Full name: Sport Club Haifa Robi Shapira מועדון ספורט חיפה רובי שפירא
- Short name: Hapoel Robi Haifa
- Founded: 2014
- Dissolved: 2023
- Ground: Nesher Stadium
- Owner: Workers city Association
- President: Rachel Shapira
- 2023–24: Liga Alef North, 18th (folded)
Home colours	Away colours

F.C. Haifa Robi Shapira (Hebrew: מועדון ספורט חיפה רובי שפירא), also known as Hapoel Robi Shapira Haifa (Hebrew: הפועל רובי חיפה) was an Israeli football club based in Haifa. The club was formed in 2014 by Hapoel Haifa supporters, opposed to Hapoel Haifa owner, Yoav Katz. The club was playing in Liga Alef North division.

== Origins and formation ==
Hapoel Haifa was established in 1924 and enjoyed considerable success during its existence, winning the Israel State Cup four times, as well as several minor cups and spending most of its time in the Israeli top division. In 1992, the club was bought by businessman Robi Shapira, who led the club to its first championship in 1998–99.

Robi Shapira committed suicide in December 2001, and the club was managed by temporary liquidators until 2004, when it was bought by businessman Yoav Katz. Since 2004 a core of fans opposing Katz's regime has formed, and in 2014 an alternate association was formed by the opposing fans, called "Ir Hapo'alim" (City of Laborers, Hebrew: עיר הפועלים), through which the club, initially called informally Hapoel Robi Haifa, was formed.

In August 2014 the club was registered with the IFA. However, the IFA rejected the club choice of name since the name is registered with Hapoel Haifa's youth team, playing in the Israeli Noar Premier League. The club therefore settled on the name "F.C. Haifa Robi Shapira", and was registered to the Shomron division of Liga Gimel.

During 2014–15 season, Hapoel association had authorized F.C. Haifa to add the association's name "Hapoel" to the club's name. Therefore, in the 2015–16 season, the club was called "Hapoel Robi Shapira Haifa".

== History ==
On 12 September 2014 the club played it first official match, beating Hapoel Tirat HaCarmel 3–0 in the second round of the State Cup.

The club finished the 2014–15 season on top of Liga Gimel Samaria division, being undefeated throughout the whole season with 24 wins and 2 draws, and won promotion to Liga Bet.

The club finished his 2015–16 season on Liga Bet also in the first place, with 22 wins, 4 draws and 4 losses. The club was promoted to the 3rd league, Liga Alef.

In June 2023 the he activity of the club was stopped.

== Shirt Sponsors and manufacturers ==
Period	Kit Manufacturer	Shirt Sponsor
2014–15	Adidas	דן מור סוכנות לביטוח
2015–16	Adidas	מורג נכסים
2016–17	Macron	מעוף המשאב האנושי
2017–18	Diadora	סוכנות לביטוח ירושלים
2018–19	Givova	Kopell Group
2019–20	Kelme	Kopell Group

== Honours ==
=== League ===
Honour	No.	Years
Fourth tier	1	2015–16
Fifth tier	1	2014–15

=== Cups ===
Honour	No.	Years
Liga Bet North B Division Cup	1	2015–16
Liga Gimel Samaria Division Cup	1	2014–15
