= 2010–11 Israeli Premier League =

Israeli Premier League
- Season: 2010–11
- Dates: 21 August 2010 – 21 May 2011
- Champions: Maccabi Haifa; 7th Premier League title 12th Israel title overall
- Relegated: Hapoel Ashkelon; Hapoel Ramat Gan
- Champions League: Maccabi Haifa
- Europa League: Hapoel Tel Aviv; Maccabi Tel Aviv; Bnei Yehuda
- Matches: 276
- Goals: 737 (2.67 per match)
- Top goalscorer: Toto Tamuz (21 goals)
- Biggest home win: H. Tel Aviv 5–0 H. Haifa; H. Be'er Sheva 5–0 Ashdod
- Biggest away win: H. Petah Tikva 1–5 H. Tel Aviv; H. Ashkelon 0–4 M. Netanya; H. Ramat Gan 0–4 H. Ashkelon; M. Netanya 0–4 Bnei Yehuda
- Highest scoring: H. Ashkelon 3–4 H. Be'er Sheva
- Average attendance: 3,939

The 2010–11 Israeli Premier League was the twelfth season since its introduction in 1999 and the 69th season of top-tier football in Israel. It began on 21 August 2010 and ended on 21 May 2011. Hapoel Tel Aviv were the defending champions.

Maccabi Haifa secured the title with a 2–0 win against Ironi Kiryat Shmona on 16 May 2011. This was their twelfth Israeli league title, This win gave Maccabi Haifa a 6-point advantage over the second-place team Hapoel Tel Aviv with one more round to go.

== Teams ==
Locations of the 2010–11 Israeli Premier League teams

A total of sixteen teams compete in the league, including fourteen sides from the 2009–10 season and two promoted teams from the 2009–10 Liga Leumit.

Maccabi Ahi Nazareth and Hapoel Ra'anana were directly relegated to the 2010–11 Liga Leumit after finishing the 2009–10 season in the two bottom places.

Two teams were directly promoted from the 2009–10 Liga Leumit. These were champions Ironi Kiryat Shmona and the runners-up Hapoel Ashkelon.

Club	Stadium	Capacity
Beitar Jerusalem	Teddy Stadium	21,600
Bnei Sakhnin	Doha Stadium	8,500
Bnei Yehuda	Bloomfield Stadium	15,700
F.C. Ashdod	Yud-Alef Stadium	7,800
Hapoel Acre	Green Stadium^{[A]}	4,000
Hapoel Ashkelon	Sala Stadium	5,250
Hapoel Be'er Sheva	Vasermil Stadium	13,000
Hapoel Haifa	Kiryat Eliezer Stadium	14,002
Hapoel Petah Tikva	Ramat Gan Stadium^{[B]}	41,583
Hapoel Ramat Gan	Winter Stadium^{[A]}	8,000
Hapoel Tel Aviv	Bloomfield Stadium	15,700
Ironi Kiryat Shmona	Ironi Stadium	5,300
Maccabi Haifa	Kiryat Eliezer Stadium	14,002
Maccabi Netanya	Sar-Tov Stadium	7,500
Maccabi Petah Tikva	Ramat Gan Stadium^{[B]}	41,583
Maccabi Tel Aviv	Bloomfield Stadium	15,700

^A The club played their home games at a neutral venue because their own ground did not meet Premier League requirements.
^B The Petah Tikva Municipal Stadium was demolished. Hapoel and Maccabi Petah Tikva are hosting their home games in alternative stadia until the new Petah Tikva Stadium will be fully constructed. Both Hapoel and Maccabi chose to host its games in Ramat Gan Stadium.

Beitar Jerusalem	Bnei Yehuda Hapoel Tel Aviv Maccabi Tel Aviv	Ironi Kiryat Shmona	Hapoel Acre
Teddy Stadium	Bloomfield Stadium	Kiryat Shmona Stadium	Green Stadium
Maccabi Netanya	Hapoel Haifa Maccabi Haifa	Hapoel Petah Tikva Maccabi Petah Tikva	Hapoel Ashkelon
Sar-Tov Stadium	Kiryat Eliezer Stadium	Ramat Gan Stadium	Sala Stadium
F.C. Ashdod	Bnei Sakhnin	Hapoel Be'er Sheva	Hapoel Ramat Gan
Yud-Alef Stadium	Doha Stadium	Vasermil Stadium	Winter Stadium

=== Managerial changes ===
Team	Outgoing manager	Manner of departure	Date of vacancy	Table	Incoming manager	Date of appointment	Table
F.C. Ashdod	(Israel) Yossi Mizrahi	Resigned	20 May 2010	6th (09–10)	(England) John Gregory	20 May 2010	Pre-Season
Hapoel Haifa	(Israel) Shlomi Dora	Resigned	25 May 2010	11th (09–10)	(Israel) Nitzan Shirazi	5 June 2010	Pre-Season
Hapoel Acre	(Israel) Yaron Hochenboim	End of contract	27 May 2010	12th (09–10)	(Israel) Eli Cohen	28 May 2010	Pre-Season
Bnei Yehuda	(Israel) Guy Luzon	End of contract	31 May 2010	4th (09–10)	(Israel) Dror Kashtan	31 May 2010	Pre-Season
Hapoel Be'er Sheva	(Israel) Vico Haddad	End of contract	31 May 2010	9th (09–10)	(Israel) Nir Klinger	31 May 2010	Pre-Season
Hapoel Ashkelon	(Israel) Uri Malmilian	End of contract	31 May 2010	Liga Leumit; 2nd (09–10)	(Israel) Guy Azouri	14 June 2010	Pre-Season
Maccabi Tel Aviv	(Israel) Nir Levine	End of contract	31 May 2010	3rd (09–10)	(Israel) Yossi Mizrahi	10 June 2010	Pre-Season
Beitar Jerusalem	(Israel) David Amsalem	Stepped down to assistant manager	11 June 2010	5th (09–10)	(Israel) Uri Malmilian	11 June 2010	Pre-Season
Hapoel Ramat Gan	(Israel) Yuval Naim	Resigned	29 June 2010	14th (09–10)	(Israel) Shlomi Dora	1 July 2010	Pre-Season
Bnei Sakhnin	(Israel) Marco Balbul	Resigned	29 June 2010	7th (09–10)	(Israel) Yuval Naim	1 July 2010	Pre-Season
Bnei Sakhnin	(Israel) Yuval Naim	Sacked	11 August 2010	Pre-Season	(Israel) Haim Levy	14 August 2010	Pre-Season
Bnei Sakhnin	(Israel) Haim Levy	Sacked	27 September 2010	16th	(Israel) Slobodan Drapić	27 September 2010	16th
Hapoel Petah Tikva	(Israel) Eli Mahpud	Sacked	16 October 2010	14th	(Israel) Yuval Naim	16 October 2010	14th
Hapoel Ramat Gan	(Israel) Shlomi Dora	Sacked	15 November 2010	16th	(Israel) Tzvika Tzemah	15 November 2010	16th
Maccabi Tel Aviv	(Israel) Yossi Mizrahi	Resigned	4 January 2011	3rd	(Israel) Itzik Ovadia (caretaker)	4 January 2011	3rd
Maccabi Tel Aviv	(Israel) Itzik Ovadia (caretaker)	Resigned	10 January 2011	3rd	(Israel) Motti Ivanir	10 January 2011	3rd
Hapoel Ramat Gan	(Israel) Tzvika Tzemah	Resigned	15 January 2011	16th	(Israel) Itzik Baruch (caretaker)	15 January 2011	16th
Beitar Jerusalem	(Israel) Uri Malmilian	Resigned	17 January 2011	12th	(Israel) Ronny Levy	17 January 2011	12th
Hapoel Ramat Gan	(Israel) Itzik Baruch (caretaker)	End of tenure as caretaker	3 February 2011	16th	(Israel) Yaron Hochenboim	3 February 2011	16th
Hapoel Ashkelon	(Israel) Guy Azouri	Sacked	15 March 2011	15th	(Israel) Eli Mahpud	15 March 2011	15th
Bnei Sakhnin	(Israel) Slobodan Drapić	Resigned	4 April 2011	15th	(Israel) Shlomi Dora	4 April 2011	15th
Hapoel Petah Tikva	(Israel) Yuval Naim	Sacked	13 April 2011	13th	(Israel) Itzik Shaki (caretaker)	13 April 2011	13th
F.C. Ashdod	(England) John Gregory	Resigned	18 April 2011	13th	(Israel) Yossi Mizrahi	18 April 2011	13th
Hapoel Petah Tikva	(Israel) Itzik Shaki (caretaker)	End of tenure as caretaker	1 May 2011	13th	(Israel) Gili Landau	1 May 2011	13th

=== Foreign players ===
Club	Player 1	Player 2	Player 3	Player 4	Player 5	Non-visa Foreign	Former Players
Beitar Jerusalem	(Democratic Republic of the Congo) **Hervé Kage**	(Ghana) Samuel Yeboah	(Uruguay) Cristian González			(France) Steven Cohen^{2}	(Argentina) Darío Fernández (Chile) Cristián Álvarez (Ivory Coast) Serge Ayeli
Bnei Sakhnin	(Bulgaria) **Atanas Bornosuzov**	(Bulgaria) **Danail Mitev**	(Bulgaria) **Kostadin Hazurov**	(Democratic Republic of the Congo) Paty Yeye Lenkebe	(Slovenia) Nastja Čeh		(Croatia) Dario Zahora (Romania) Cristian Dănălache (Slovenia) Darijan Matić
Bnei Yehuda	(Argentina) Pedro Galván	(Colombia) Iván Garrido	(Lithuania) Kęstutis Ivaškevičius	(Nigeria) Dele Aiyenugba	(Serbia) **Nenad Marinković**		(Armenia) Yeghia Yavruyan
F.C. Ashdod	(Bosnia and Herzegovina) Dragan Stojkić	(Bulgaria) Dimitar Makriev	(Cameroon) Stéphane Mpondo	(Haiti) Emmanuel Sarki	(Nigeria) Efe Ambrose		(Uruguay) Cristian González
Hapoel Acre	(Cameroon) **Zome Louis**	(Nigeria) Dimaku Fidelis	(Togo) Arafat Djako			(Argentina) Nicolás Falczuk^{2}	(Ghana) Ibrahim Abdul Razak (Ghana) Samed Abdul Awudu
Hapoel Ashkelon	(Ghana) Eric Gawu	(Ghana) Stephen Ahorlu	(Ivory Coast) **Serge Ayeli**	(Serbia) Darko Lovrić	(Slovenia) **Suad Fileković**	(Armenia) **Yeghia Yavruyan**^{1}	(Georgia (country)) Zurab Menteshashvili (Ghana) Eric Nyarko
Hapoel Be'er Sheva	(Brazil) William Soares	(Ghana) **Ibrahim Abdul Razak**	(Ghana) Ibrahim Basit	(Ghana) James Bissue		(United States) Ryan Adeleye^{2}	(Portugal) Bernardo Vasconcelos (Portugal) Ricardo Fernandes
Hapoel Haifa	(Democratic Republic of the Congo) Savity Lipenia	(Serbia) Nikola Grubješić	(Serbia) Saša Stojanović			(Croatia) Tvrtko Kale^{2}	
Hapoel Petah Tikva	(Ghana) Daniel Addo	(Kyrgyzstan) **Mirlan Murzayev**	(Nigeria) Austin Ejide	(Switzerland) **Fabian Stoller**	(Togo) Emmanuel Mathias		(France) Jonathan Assous^{2} (Ghana) William Amamoo (Peru) Junior Viza
Hapoel Ramat Gan	(Argentina) Carlos Chacana	(Bulgaria) Dimitar Telkiyski	(Bulgaria) Elin Topuzakov	(Ghana) **Awudu Okocha**	(Lithuania) **Aurelijus Staponka**	(France) **Jonathan Assous**^{2}	(Bulgaria) Krum Bibishkov (Russia) **Vitaliy Sidorov** (Spain) Pablo Buendía (Uruguay) Claudio Rivero
Hapoel Tel Aviv	(Nigeria) Vincent Enyeama	(Slovenia) **Mário Pečalka**	(South Africa) Bevan Fransman				(Brazil) Douglas Silva (France) Romain Rocchi (Ghana) William Owusu
Ironi Kiryat Shmona	(United States) Bryan Gerzicich	(Zambia) William Njobvu					(Nigeria) Caleb Ekwegwo (North Macedonia) Zoran Baldovaliev
Maccabi Haifa	(Colombia) Jhon Culma	(Georgia (country)) Vladimir Dvalishvili	(Ghana) **Seidu Yahaya**	(South Africa) Tsepo Masilela	(Ukraine) **Andriy Pylyavskyi**	(Brazil) Gustavo Boccoli^{1}	(Argentina) Ignacio Canuto (Portugal) Adrien Silva
Maccabi Netanya	(Bolivia) Carlos Arias	(Ukraine) Leonid Krupnik	(Ukraine) **Serhiy Tretyak**				(Georgia (country)) Gaga Chkhetiani
Maccabi Petah Tikva	(Croatia) Ivan Mance	(France) Sébastien Sansoni	(Germany) **Manuel Bölstler**	(Serbia) Nebojša Marinković	(Uruguay) Joe Bizera	(Russia) Murad Magomedov^{3}	(France) Steven Pelé
Maccabi Tel Aviv	(Bosnia and Herzegovina) Haris Medunjanin	(Brazil) Nivaldo	(Bulgaria) Dimitar Rangelov	(Mali) Djibril Sidibé	(Montenegro) Savo Pavićević		(Cameroon) Albert Baning

In bold: Players that join the club mid-season

In Italic: Players that left the club mid-season

The following do not fill a Visa position:
^{1}Players who were born and started their professional career abroad but have since gained an Israeli passport or permanent residency, allowing them to play with Israeli status;
^{2}Players who were born and started their professional career abroad but are eligible for Israeli citizenship due to Jewish ancestry;

^{3}Israeli citizens who have chosen to represent another national team;

== Regular season ==
=== Table ===
Pos	Team	Pld	W	D	L	GF	GA	GD	Pts	Qualification
1	Maccabi Haifa	30	21	7	2	55	25	+30	70	Qualification for the championship round
2	Hapoel Tel Aviv	30	20	5	5	65	27	+38	65	Qualification for the championship round
3	Maccabi Tel Aviv	30	15	5	10	41	33	+8	50	Qualification for the championship round
4	Ironi Kiryat Shmona	30	13	9	8	50	34	+16	48	Qualification for the championship round
5	Bnei Yehuda	30	13	9	8	33	27	+6	48	Qualification for the championship round
6	Maccabi Netanya	30	11	11	8	39	33	+6	44	Qualification for the championship round
7	Hapoel Haifa	30	12	8	10	38	37	+1	44	Qualification for the middle round
8	Maccabi Petah Tikva	30	11	9	10	50	39	+11	42	Qualification for the middle round
9	Hapoel Acre	30	10	11	9	43	38	+5	41	Qualification for the middle round
10	Hapoel Be'er Sheva	30	10	8	12	36	38	−2	38	Qualification for the middle round
11	Beitar Jerusalem	30	10	8	12	30	32	−2	38	Qualification for the relegation round
12	Hapoel Petah Tikva	30	9	6	15	36	51	−15	33	Qualification for the relegation round
13	F.C. Ironi Ashdod	30	8	9	13	36	52	−16	33	Qualification for the relegation round
14	Hapoel Ashkelon	30	7	5	18	29	56	−27	26	Qualification for the relegation round
15	Bnei Sakhnin	30	6	7	17	19	40	−21	25	Qualification for the relegation round
16	Hapoel Ramat Gan (Note: Hapoel Ramat Gan were docked four points due to double contracts with players and staff in the previous year.)	30	1	9	20	18	56	−38	8	Qualification for the relegation round

Source: Israel Football Association
Rules for classification: 1st points; 2nd goal difference; 3rd matches won; 4th goals scored; 5th head-to-head; 6th decision match

=== Results ===
Home \ Away	BEI	BnY	BnS	ASH	HAC	HAS	HBS	HHA	HPT	HRG	HTA	IKS	MHA	MNE	MPT	MTA
Beitar Jerusalem	—	1–1	0–0	0–0	2–0	4–0	5–1	1–0	0–2 (Note: Beitar Jerusalem hosted the match against Hapoel Petah Tikva without a crowd of both sides due to Beitar fans hooliganism.)	3–2	1–0	1–0 (Note: Beitar Jerusalem hosted the match against Ironi Kiryat Shmona without a crowd of both sides due to Beitar fans racist calls.)	0–0	0–0	0–2	0–1
Bnei Yehuda	2–1	—	2–0	0–0	1–0	2–0	0–0	3–2	2–0	0–0	0–1	3–1	2–3	1–1	2–0	2–0
Bnei Sakhnin	1–0	0–1	—	0–2	0–1	2–0	1–1	1–3	1–1	0–0	1–3	1–0	1–2	1–1	2–3	1–3
F.C. Ironi Ashdod	3–0 (Note: F.C. Ashdod hosted the match against Beitar Jerusalem without a crowd of both sides due to Ashdod fans hooliganism.)	1–2	0–0	—	3–1	3–2	0–3 (Note: The match between F.C. Ashdod and Hapoel Be'er Sheva was abandoned with a 3–3 draw in the 93rd minute after the linesman had been hit, allegedly by an iron sign thrown by Ashdod's crowd. Hapoel Be'er Sheva was awarded with a technical win.)	0–0	1–2	2–2	3–3	2–2	1–2	1–0	1–3	1–2
Hapoel Acre	3–0	3–1	0–0	1–2	—	1–0	2–3	2–1	3–0	0–0	2–2	3–0	0–2	0–0	1–1	3–1
Hapoel Ashkelon	2–1	0–0	1–0	4–1	0–0	—	3–4	0–0	3–1	1–1	0–2	0–1	0–3	0–4	0–1	2–4
Hapoel Be'er Sheva	1–2	0–1	1–0	5–0	0–2	1–0	—	0–2	0–0	2–0	0–3	1–1	1–1	1–2	2–1	0–1
Hapoel Haifa	0–2	2–0	4–1	2–0	1–1	1–2	1–1	—	3–2	2–0	1–0	1–4	0–2	1–2	1–1	0–0
Hapoel Petah Tikva	1–0	2–1	0–1	3–1	2–2	0–2	3–1	2–0	—	2–0	1–5	1–3	0–1	1–1	1–4	0–1
Hapoel Ramat Gan	0–0	1–1	1–2	1–2	3–2	0–4	0–0	1–2	1–1	—	0–1	0–3	1–3	0–1	0–2	0–3
Hapoel Tel Aviv	0–0	0–1	1–0	0–2	4–1	5–1 (Note: Hapoel Tel Aviv hosted the match against Hapoel Ashkelon without a crowd of both sides due to Hapoel fans hooliganism.)	3–2	5–0	2–0	4–0	—	2–4	4–1	2–1	2–0	1–0
Ironi Kiryat Shmona	0–1	2–2	2–0	3–0	2–2	2–2	1–0	1–3	3–1	1–0	1–1	—	0–1	3–0	2–2	4–0
Maccabi Haifa	3–3	1–0	1–0	1–1	3–1	3–0	2–2	0–0	2–0	3–2	0–2	3–2	—	3–0	1–0	3–0
Maccabi Netanya	4–1	0–0	1–0	2–0	1–3	3–0	1–0	1–1	3–3	2–0	1–3	1–1	1–1	—	2–2	0–2
Maccabi Petah Tikva	2–1	3–0	1–2	2–2	1–1	4–0	0–1	2–3	2–3	4–1	1–2	0–0	1–3	2–0	—	2–2
Maccabi Tel Aviv	1–0	2–0	4–0	4–1	2–2	2–0	0–2	0–1	2–1 (Note: Maccabi Tel Aviv hosted the match against Hapoel Petah Tikva without a crowd of both sides due to Maccabi fans racist calls against Abbas Suan in the match against Bnei Sakhnin.)	2–0	1–1	0–1	0–1	0–3	1–1	—

Source: Israel Football Association
Legend: Blue = home team win; Yellow = draw; Red = away team win.

== Playoffs ==
Key numbers for pairing determination (number marks position after 30 games):

Rounds
31st	32nd	33rd	34th	35th
1 – 6; 2 – 5; 3 – 4	1 – 2; 5 – 3; 6 – 4	2 – 6; 3 – 1; 4 – 5	1 – 4; 2 – 3; 6 – 5	3 – 6; 4 – 2; 5 – 1
7 – 10; 8 – 9	7 – 8; 10 – 9	8 – 10; 9 – 7		
11 – 16; 12 – 15; 13 – 14	11 – 12; 15 – 13; 16 – 14	12 – 16; 13 – 11; 14 – 15	11 – 14; 12 – 13; 16 – 15	13 – 16; 14 – 12; 15 – 11

=== Top playoff ===
The points obtained during the regular season were halved (and rounded up) before the start of the playoff. Thus, Maccabi Haifa started with 35 points, Hapoel Tel Aviv with 33, Maccabi Tel Aviv with 25, Ironi Kiryat Shmona with 24, Bnei Yehuda with 24 and Maccabi Netanya started with 22.

==== Table ====
Pos	Team	Pld	W	D	L	GF	GA	GD	Pts	Qualification
1	Maccabi Haifa (C)	35	24	8	3	63	28	+35	45	Qualification for the Champions League second qualifying round
2	Hapoel Tel Aviv	35	21	7	7	72	36	+36	38	Qualification for the Europa League third qualifying round (Note: Hapoel Tel Aviv have qualified for the third qualifying round of the 2011–12 UEFA Europa League after winning the 2010–11 Israel State Cup.)
3	Maccabi Tel Aviv	35	18	6	11	53	40	+13	35	Qualification for the Europa League second qualifying round
4	Bnei Yehuda	35	15	10	10	42	34	+8	31	Qualification for the Europa League second qualifying round
5	Ironi Kiryat Shmona	35	14	10	11	57	45	+12	28	
6	Maccabi Netanya	35	12	13	10	47	47	0	27	

Source: Israel Football Association
Rules for classification: 1st points; 2nd goal difference; 3rd matches won; 4th goals scored; 5th head-to-head; 6th decision match
(C) Champions

==== Results ====
Home \ Away	BnY	HTA	IKS	MHA	MNE	MTA
Bnei Yehuda	—	—	—	1–1	—	1–3
Hapoel Tel Aviv	2–1	—	—	—	2–2	2–2
Ironi Kiryat Shmona	1–2	2–1	—	—	—	—
Maccabi Haifa	—	2–0	2–0	—	1–2	—
Maccabi Netanya	0–4	—	3–3	—	—	—
Maccabi Tel Aviv	—	—	3–1	0–2	4–1	—

Source: Israel Football Association
Legend: Blue = home team win; Yellow = draw; Red = away team win.

=== Middle playoff ===
The points obtained during the regular season were halved (and rounded up) before the start of the playoff. Thus, Hapoel Haifa started with 22 points, Maccabi Petah Tikva with 21, Hapoel Acre with 21 and Hapoel Be'er Sheva started with 19.

==== Table ====
Pos	Team	Pld	W	D	L	GF	GA	GD	Pts
7	Maccabi Petah Tikva	33	13	10	10	57	41	+16	28
8	Hapoel Acre	33	12	11	10	49	45	+4	27
9	Hapoel Be'er Sheva	33	11	9	13	41	43	−2	23
10	Hapoel Haifa	33	12	8	13	40	43	−3	22

Source: Israel Football Association
Rules for classification: 1st points; 2nd goal difference; 3rd matches won; 4th goals scored; 5th head-to-head; 6th decision match

==== Results ====
Home \ Away	HAC	HBS	HHA	MPT
Hapoel Acre	—	—	2–1	—
Hapoel Be'er Sheva	2–3	—	—	—
Hapoel Haifa	—	1–2	—	0–2
Maccabi Petah Tikva	4–1	1–1	—	—

Source: Israel Football Association
Legend: Blue = home team win; Yellow = draw; Red = away team win.

=== Bottom playoff ===
The points obtained during the regular season were halved (and rounded up) before the start of the playoff. Thus, Beitar Jerusalem started with 19 points, Hapoel Petah Tikva with 17, F.C. Ashdod with 17, Hapoel Ashkelon with 13, Bnei Sakhnin with 13 and Hapoel Ramat Gan started with 4.

==== Table ====
Pos	Team	Pld	W	D	L	GF	GA	GD	Pts	Qualification or relegation
11	Beitar Jerusalem	35	12	9	14	38	35	+3	26	
12	F.C. Ironi Ashdod	35	10	11	14	42	55	−13	25	
13	Bnei Sakhnin	35	9	8	18	25	44	−19	23	
14	Hapoel Petah Tikva (O)	35	10	8	17	42	58	−16	22	Qualification for the relegation play-offs
15	Hapoel Ashkelon (R)	35	9	5	21	33	66	−33	19	Relegation to Liga Leumit
16	Hapoel Ramat Gan (R)	35	3	9	23	24	65	−41	10	Relegation to Liga Leumit

Source: Israel Football Association
Rules for classification: 1st points; 2nd goal difference; 3rd matches won; 4th goals scored; 5th head-to-head; 6th decision match
(O) Play-off winners; (R) Relegated

==== Results ====
Home \ Away	BEI	BnS	ASH	HAS	HPT	HRG
Beitar Jerusalem	—	—	—	0–1	3–0	5–1
Bnei Sakhnin	1–0	—	1–0	—	—	—
F.C. Ironi Ashdod	0–0	—	—	4–1	—	1–0
Hapoel Ashkelon	—	2–1	—	—	0–3	—
Hapoel Petah Tikva	—	1–1	1–1	—	—	1–2
Hapoel Ramat Gan	—	1–2	—	2–0	—	—

Source: Israel Football Association
Legend: Blue = home team win; Yellow = draw; Red = away team win.

== Relegation playoff ==
The 14th-placed team, Hapoel Petah Tikva faced the 3rd-placed Liga Leumit team Hapoel Kfar Saba. Hapoel Petah Tikva, the winner on aggregate earned a spot in the 2011–12 Israeli Premier League. The matches took place on 24 and 27 May 2011.

24 May 2011
19:00 UTC+3

Hapoel Petah Tikva	4–1	Hapoel Kfar Saba
Luzon 7', 31'; Exbard 22'; Tzarfati 52'	Report	86' Abu Arar

Ramat Gan Stadium, Ramat Gan
Referee: Asaf Kenan

27 May 2011
17:00 UTC+3

Hapoel Kfar Saba	0–1	Hapoel Petah Tikva
	Report	9' Turgeman

Levita Stadium, Kfar Saba
Referee: Roi Reinshreiber

Hapoel Petah Tikva won 5–1 on aggregate.

== Top goalscorers ==
Rank	Scorer	Club	Goals
1	(Israel) Toto Tamuz	Hapoel Tel Aviv	21
2	(Israel) Eden Ben Basat	Hapoel Haifa	18
2	(Israel) Eliran Atar	Maccabi Tel Aviv	18
4	(Israel) Moshe Ohayon	F.C. Ashdod	17
5	(Argentina) Pedro Galván	Bnei Yehuda	16
5	(Israel) Ben Sahar	Hapoel Tel Aviv	16
7	(Israel) Omer Damari	Maccabi Petah Tikva	15
8	(Israel) Roei Dayan	Hapoel Acre	14
8	(Israel) Wiyam Amashe	Ironi Kiryat Shmona	14
10	(Israel) Tomer Hemed	Maccabi Haifa	13
Total			737
Average per game			2.67

Source: Israel Football Association

== Season statistics ==
=== Scoring ===
- First goal of the season: (Israel) Mahmoud Abbas for Hapoel Ashkelon against Hapoel Petah Tikva, 37th minute (21 August 2010)
- Widest winning margin: 5 goals –
  - Hapoel Tel Aviv 5–0 Hapoel Haifa (1 January 2011)
  - Hapoel Be'er Sheva 5–0 F.C. Ashdod (5 February 2011)
- Most goals in a match: 7 goals – Hapoel Ashkelon 3–4 Hapoel Be'er Sheva (12 March 2011)
- Most goals in a half: 5 goals – Hapoel Ramat Gan 3–2 Hapoel Acre, 0–0 at half-time (26 September 2010)
- Most goals in a match by one player: 3 goals –
  - (Israel) Wiyam Amashe for Ironi Kiryat Shmona against Hapoel Tel Aviv (25 September 2010)
  - (Israel) Ohad Kadousi for Hapoel Petah Tikva against Maccabi Netanya (22 January 2011)
  - (Israel) Dovev Gabay for Hapoel Be'er Sheva against F.C. Ashdod (5 February 2011)

=== Discipline ===
- First yellow card of the season: (Israel) Adir Tubul for Hapoel Ashkelon against Hapoel Petah Tikva, 31st minute (21 August 2010)
- First red card of the season: (Israel) Rubil Sarsour for Maccabi Petah Tikva against Hapoel Be'er Sheva, 74th minute (23 August 2010)

== See also ==
- 2010–11 Israel State Cup
- 2010–11 Toto Cup Al
- List of 2010–11 Israeli football transfers
