= 2015–16 Israeli Premier League =

Liga de Israel 2015-16

Israeli Premier League
- Dates: 22 August 2015 – 21 May 2016
- Champions: Hapoel Be'er Sheva (3rd title)
- Relegated: Hapoel Acre; Maccabi Netanya
- Champions League: Hapoel Be'er Sheva
- Europa League: Maccabi Tel Aviv; Beitar Jerusalem; Maccabi Haifa
- Top goalscorer: Eran Zahavi (35 goals)
- Biggest home win: Maccabi Tel Aviv 6–0 Maccabi Haifa
- Biggest away win: Hapoel Tel Aviv 0-4 Bnei Sakhnin
- Highest scoring: Hapoel Be'er Sheva 5-2 Maccabi Petah Tikva
- Average attendance: 6,953

The 2015–16 Israeli Premier League was the seventeenth season since its introduction in 1999 and the 74th season of top-tier football in Israel. It began on 22 August 2015 and endedi in May 2016. Hapoel Be'er Sheva became champion after 40 years without winning a main national competition, interrupting the sequence of three consecutive titles of Maccabi Tel Aviv.

== Teams ==
A total of fourteen teams were competing in the league, including twelve sides from the 2014–15 season and two promoted teams from the 2014–15 Liga Leumit.

Hapoel Petah Tikva and F.C. Ashdod were relegated to the 2015–16 Liga Leumit after finishing the 2014–15 Israeli Premier League in the bottom two places.

Bnei Yehuda Tel Aviv and Hapoel Kfar Saba were promoted after finishing the 2014–15 Liga Leumit in the top two places.

=== Stadia and locations ===
Locations of the 2015–16 Israeli Premier League teams

Team	Location	Stadium	Capacity
Beitar Jerusalem	Jerusalem	Teddy Stadium	31,733
Bnei Sakhnin	Sakhnin	Doha Stadium	8,500
Bnei Yehuda	Tel Aviv	Bloomfield Stadium	14,413
Hapoel Acre	Acre	Acre Stadium	5,000
Hapoel Be'er Sheva	Be'er Sheva	Turner Stadium	16,126
Hapoel Haifa	Haifa	Sammy Ofer Stadium	30,940
Hapoel Kfar Saba	Kfar Saba	Levita Stadium	5,800
Hapoel Ra'anana	Ra'anana	Netanya Stadium, Netanya	13,610
Hapoel Tel Aviv	Tel Aviv	Bloomfield Stadium	14,413
Ironi Kiryat Shmona	Kiryat Shmona	Kiryat Shmona Stadium	5,300
Maccabi Haifa	Haifa	Sammy Ofer Stadium	30,950
Maccabi Netanya	Netanya	Netanya Stadium	13,610
Maccabi Petah Tikva	Petah Tikva	HaMoshava Stadium	11,500
Maccabi Tel Aviv	Tel Aviv	Bloomfield Stadium	14,413

Bloomfield Stadium	Netanya Stadium	Sammy Ofer Stadium	
Bnei Yehuda; Hapoel Tel Aviv; Maccabi Tel Aviv	Hapoel Ra'anana; Maccabi Netanya	Hapoel Haifa; Maccabi Haifa	
Acre Stadium	Doha Stadium	HaMoshava Stadium	
Hapoel Acre	Bnei Sakhnin	Maccabi Petah Tikva	
Kiryat Shmona Stadium	Levita Stadium	Teddy Stadium	Turner Stadium
Ironi Kiryat Shmona	Hapoel Kfar Saba	Beitar Jerusalem	Hapoel Be'er Sheva

=== Personnel and sponsorship ===
Team	President	Manager	Captain	Kitmaker	Shirt sponsor
Beitar Jerusalem	(Israel) Eli Tabib	(Israel) Slobodan Drapić	(Serbia) Dušan Matović	Puma	itrader
Bnei Sakhnin	(Israel) Mohammed Abu Yunes	(Israel) Yossi Abukasis	(Israel) Khaled Khalaila	Umbro	Toyga
Bnei Yehuda	(Israel) Moshe Damaio	(Israel) Yossi Mizrahi	(Israel) Assi Baldout	Macron	Azrieli Group
Hapoel Acre	(Israel) Yehuda Barshishat	(Israel) Shlomi Dora	(Israel) Moshe Mishaelof	Macron	Azrieli Group
Hapoel Be'er Sheva	(Israel) Alona Barkat	(Israel) Barak Bakhar	(Israel) Elyaniv Barda	Kappa	Mobli
Hapoel Kfar Saba	(Israel) Stav Shaham	(Israel) Sharon Mimer	(Israel) Hen Dilmoni	Lotto	
Hapoel Haifa	(Israel) Yoav Katz	(Israel) Meir Ben Margi	(Israel) Oshri Roash	Diadora	Hatama
Hapoel Ra'anana	(Israel) Asher Alon	(Israel) Haim Silvas	(Israel) Snir Shuker	Umbro	ME Tel Aviv
Hapoel Tel Aviv	(Israel) Amir Gross Kabiri	(Israel) Eli Guttman	(Israel) Ariel Harush	Puma	Fujicom
Ironi Kiryat Shmona	(Israel) Izzy Sheratzky	(Israel) Shlomi Dora	(Israel) Oz Raly	Puma	Ituran
Maccabi Haifa	(Israel) Ya'akov Shahar	(Israel) Ronny Levy	(Israel) Yossi Benayoun	Nike	Honda
Maccabi Netanya	(Israel) Eli Segev	(Israel) Meni Koretski	(Israel) Eran Levy	Joma	Burgus Burger Bar
Maccabi Petah Tikva	(Israel) Amos Luzon	(Israel) Ran Ben Shimon	(Israel) Naor Peser	Macron	Panorama North
Maccabi Tel Aviv	(Canada) Mitchell Goldhar	(Netherlands) Peter Bosz	(Israel) Eran Zahavi	Adidas	

=== Foreign players ===
The number of foreign players is restricted to five per team.

Club	Player 1	Player 2	Player 3	Player 4	Player 5	Former player
Beitar Jerusalem	(Australia) Nikita Rukavytsya	(Brazil) Claudemir	(Netherlands) **Arsenio Valpoort**	(Serbia) Dušan Matović	(Spain) Jesús Rueda	(Spain) Pablo de Lucas
Bnei Sakhnin	(Bosnia and Herzegovina) Eldar Hasanović	(Brazil) Georginho	(Brazil) Diogo Kachuba	(Brazil) **Wanderson**	(Spain) Abraham Paz	(Croatia) Igor Jovanović
Bnei Yehuda	(Argentina) Pedro Galván	(Croatia) **Antonio Mršić**	(Ivory Coast) Thierry Doubai	(Nigeria) Dele Aiyenugba	(Nigeria) Jude Nworuh	
Hapoel Acre	(Belgium) **Dylan Seys**	(Montenegro) Boris Kopitović	(Nigeria) Samuel Gilmore	(Nigeria) **Lanry Kahinda**	(Serbia) Branislav Jovanović	(Bosnia and Herzegovina) Adnan Zahirović
Hapoel Be'er Sheva	(Brazil) William Soares	(Nigeria) Anthony Nwakaeme	(Nigeria) John Ogu	(Romania) Ovidiu Hoban		
Hapoel Haifa	(Belarus) **Dmitriy Baga**	(Croatia) **Marijan Antolovic**	(Lithuania) Tadas Kijanskas	(Montenegro) Žarko Korać	(Portugal) Bruno Pinheiro	(Czech Republic) Přemysl Kovář
Hapoel Kfar Saba	(Republic of the Congo) Mavis Tchibota	(Croatia) Dino Škvorc	(Greece) Yiannis Papadopoulos	(Spain) Hugo López		(Nigeria) Lanry Kahinda
Hapoel Ra'anana	(Croatia) **Dejan Radonjić**	(Senegal) Mamadou Thiam	(Slovenia) Rene Mihelič	(Zambia) Evans Kangwa	(Zambia) Emmanuel Mbola	(Albania) Elis Bakaj
Hapoel Tel Aviv	(Brazil) **Cauê**	(The Gambia) **Hamza Barry**	(Greece) Loukas Vyntra	(Montenegro) **Nemanja Nikolić**	(Romania) Claudiu Bumba	(Burkina Faso) Issoumaila Lingane (Romania) Liviu Antal (Romania) Mihai Pintilii
Ironi Kiryat Shmona	(Bolivia) Luis Gutiérrez	(Brazil) Bruno Cantanhede	(Brazil) Kassio	(Lithuania) **Rokas Stanulevičius**	(Nigeria) **Austin Amutu**	(Brazil) **Maurício** (Central African Republic) David Manga (Nigeria) Uzochukwu Ugwu
Maccabi Haifa	(Brazil) **Romário**	(Netherlands) Glynor Plet	(Poland) Ludovic Obraniak	(Serbia) Vladimir Stojković	(Spain) Marc Valiente	(Montenegro) Nikola Drinčić
Maccabi Netanya	(Burkina Faso) **Issoumaila Lingane**	(Romania) **Mircea Axente**	(Serbia) **Nemanja Petrović**	(Serbia) Milan Smiljanić	(Ukraine) Andriy Mischenko	(Brazil) Romário (Brazil) **Thiago Santos** (The Gambia) Hamza Barry (The Gambia) Momodou Ceesay
Maccabi Petah Tikva	(Brazil) Allyson	(Democratic Republic of the Congo) Joachim Mununga	(France) Xavier Tomas	(Spain) Aitor Monroy	(Sweden) **Rade Prica**	(Lithuania) Mindaugas Panka
Maccabi Tel Aviv	(Bosnia and Herzegovina) **Haris Medunjanin**	(Nigeria) Nosa Igiebor	(Portugal) **Orlando Sá**	(Serbia) Predrag Rajković	(Spain) Carlos García	(Croatia) Dejan Radonjić (Serbia) Nikola Mitrović (Spain) Juan Pablo

In bold: Players that join the club mid-season In Italic: Players that left the club mid-season

=== Managerial changes ===
Team	Outgoing manager	Manner of departure	Date of vacancy	Position in table	Incoming manager	Date of appointment
Ironi Kiryat Shmona	(Israel) Barak Bakhar	Sacked	14 May 2015	Pre-season	(Israel) Salah Hasarma	30 May 2015
Hapoel Be'er Sheva	(Israel) Elisha Levy	End of contract	30 May 2015	Pre-season	(Israel) Barak Bakhar	30 May 2015
Maccabi Haifa	(Israel) Marco Balbul	End of contract	30 May 2015	Pre-season	(Israel) Ronny Levy	30 May 2015
Hapoel Tel Aviv	(Israel) Eli Cohen	End of contract	30 May 2015	Pre-season	(Spain) César Mendiondo	30 May 2015
Maccabi Tel Aviv	(Spain) Pako Ayestarán	End of contract	30 May 2015	Pre-season	(Serbia) Slaviša Jokanović	15 June 2015
Maccabi Netanya	(Israel) Ronny Levy	End of contract	30 May 2015	Pre-season	(Israel) Shlomi Dora	21 June 2015
Beitar Jerusalem	(Israel) Guy Levy	End of contract	7 June 2015	Pre-season	(Israel) Slobodan Drapić	7 June 2015
Hapoel Acre	(Israel) Shlomi Dora	Sacked	21 June 2015	Pre-season	(Israel) Yaron Hochenboim	28 June 2015
Hapoel Tel Aviv	(Spain) César Mendiondo	Sacked	3 September 2015	12th	(Israel) Walid Badir (caretaker)	3 September 2015
Maccabi Netanya	(Israel) Shlomi Dora	Sacked	2 November 2015	14th	(Israel) Reuven Atar	6 November 2015
Hapoel Tel Aviv	(Israel) Walid Badir (caretaker)	End of caretaker time	5 November 2015	13th	(Israel) Guy Levy	5 November 2015
Bnei Yehuda	(Israel) Yossi Abukasis	Sacked	8 December 2015	9th	(Israel) Yossi Mizrahi	9 December 2015
Bnei Sakhnin	(Israel) Eli Cohen	Sacked	18 December 2015	12th	(Israel) Yossi Abukasis	19 December 2015
Hapoel Haifa	(Israel) Tal Banin	Sacked	21 December 2015	10th	(Israel) Meir Ben Margi	21 December 2015
Maccabi Tel Aviv	(Serbia) Slaviša Jokanović	Signed By Fulham	27 December 2015	2nd	(Spain) Javier Pereira Megía (caretaker)	27 December 2015
Hapoel Kfar Saba	(Israel) Felix Naim	Sacked	3 January 2016	13th	(Israel) Sharon Mimer	11 January 2016
Maccabi Tel Aviv	(Spain) Javier Pereira Megía (caretaker)	End of caretaker time	4 January 2016	2nd	(Netherlands) Peter Bosz	4 January 2016
Maccabi Netanya	(Israel) Reuven Atar	Sacked	10 January 2016	14th	(Israel) Menahem Koretski	20 January 2016
Hapoel Tel Aviv	(Israel) Guy Levi	Sacked	19 January 2016	11th	(Israel) Eli Guttman	19 January 2016
Ironi Kiryat Shmona	(Israel) Salah Hasarma	Sacked	13 February 2016	10th	(Israel) Shlomi Dora	14 February 2016

== Regular season ==
=== Regular season table ===
Pos	Team	Pld	W	D	L	GF	GA	GD	Pts	Qualification or relegation
1	Hapoel Be'er Sheva	26	20	4	2	48	17	+31	64	Qualification for the championship round
2	Maccabi Tel Aviv	26	19	4	3	59	20	+39	61	Qualification for the championship round
3	Beitar Jerusalem	26	15	6	5	38	19	+19	51	Qualification for the championship round
4	Maccabi Haifa	26	10	8	8	33	25	+8	38	Qualification for the championship round
5	Bnei Sakhnin	26	10	6	10	32	25	+7	36	Qualification for the championship round
6	Hapoel Ra'anana	26	10	6	10	29	31	−2	36	Qualification for the championship round
7	Bnei Yehuda	26	9	6	11	27	35	−8	33	Qualification for the relegation round
8	Maccabi Petah Tikva	26	8	6	12	23	30	−7	30	Qualification for the relegation round
9	Hapoel Kfar Saba	26	7	8	11	19	31	−12	29	Qualification for the relegation round
10	Hapoel Acre	26	8	5	13	18	36	−18	29	Qualification for the relegation round
11	Ironi Kiryat Shmona	26	6	10	10	25	31	−6	28	Qualification for the relegation round
12	Hapoel Tel Aviv	26	6	9	11	17	31	−14	27	Qualification for the relegation round
13	Hapoel Haifa	26	5	10	11	27	37	−10	25	Qualification for the relegation round
14	Maccabi Netanya	26	1	8	17	10	37	−27	11	Qualification for the relegation round

Source: Israel Football Association, Soccerway
Rules for classification: 1) Points; 2) Goal difference; 3) Matches won; 4) Goals scored; 5) Head-to-head points; 6) Head-to-head goal difference; 7) Head-to-head goals scored; 8) Play-off.

=== Regular season results ===
Home \ Away	BEI	BnS	BnY	HAC	HBS	HHA	HKS	HRA	HTA	IKS	MHA	MNE	MPT	MTA
Beitar Jerusalem	—	1–0	1–0	1–0	1–3	1–1	3–1	1–0	0–0	2–0	3–0	1–0	2–0	2–2
Bnei Sakhnin	1–3	—	2–2	2–0	0–1	0–0	2–0	2–3	1–0	3–0	1–2	0–0	1–0	0–2
Bnei Yehuda	2–1	0–2	—	0–2	0–0	1–0	2–1	1–3	1–3	2–2	0–0	1–2	1–1	0–1
Hapoel Acre	1–3	2–2	0–1	—	1–0	0–1	1–0	0–1	0–1	1–0	1–1	1–1	1–0	0–3
Hapoel Be'er Sheva	2–1	2–2	2–0	3–0	—	1–0	3–0	2–0	3–1	2–1	0–0	2–0	5–2	0–1
Hapoel Haifa	1–1	2–0	0–1	3–1	1–2	—	1–1	1–1	0–1	1–4	2–4	2–0	0–3	0–3
Hapoel Kfar Saba	1–0	1–0	1–2	0–1	1–2	2–2	—	0–0	1–1	0–0	1–0	1–0	0–1	0–0
Hapoel Ra'anana	0–2	1–0	0–2	3–1	2–3	2–2	2–2	—	0–1	1–1	0–2	1–0	1–0	0–2
Hapoel Tel Aviv	0–0	0–4	3–1	0–2	0–1	0–0	0–1	2–1	—	0–3	0–3	1–1	0–1	0–1
Ironi Kiryat Shmona	0–2	0–2	1–1	0–0	1–3	1–1	0–2	0–0	3–0	—	2–0	3–0	0–1	1–1
Maccabi Haifa	0–2	0–0	0–3	4–0	1–1	3–2	1–1	2–0	0–0	0–1	—	1–0	4–0	0–2
Maccabi Netanya	0–0	0–2	0–2	0–0	0–2	1–2	0–1	1–3	1–1	1–1	0–3	—	0–0	1–3
Maccabi Petah Tikva	2–0	0–1	3–1	1–2	0–1	1–1	2–0	0–2	1–1	0–0	1–1	1–0	—	1–2
Maccabi Tel Aviv	2–4	3–2	4–0	5–0	1–2	2–1	5–0	1–2	1–1	5–0	2–1	2–1	3–1	—

Source: Israel Football Association
Legend: Blue = home team win; Yellow = draw; Red = away team win.

== Play-offs ==
=== Championship round ===
Key numbers for pairing determination (number marks position after 26 games):

Rounds
27th	28th	29th	30th	31st	32nd	33rd	34th	35th	36th
1 – 6; 2 – 5; 3 – 4	1 – 2; 5 – 3; 6 – 4	2 – 6; 3 – 1; 4 – 5	1 – 4; 2 – 3; 6 – 5	3 – 6; 4 – 2; 5 – 1	6 – 1; 5 – 2; 4 – 3	2 – 1; 3 – 5; 4 – 6	6 – 2; 1 – 3; 5 – 4	3 – 2; 4 – 1; 5 – 6	6 – 3; 2 – 4; 1 – 5

==== Championship round table ====
Pos	Team	Pld	W	D	L	GF	GA	GD	Pts	Qualification
1	Hapoel Be'er Sheva (C)	36	25	8	3	66	24	+42	83	Qualification for the Champions League second qualifying round
2	Maccabi Tel Aviv	36	24	9	3	76	24	+52	81	Qualification for the Europa League first qualifying round
3	Beitar Jerusalem (Note: Beitar Jerusalem deducted two points because of racial slurs by their fans.)	36	18	6	12	46	37	+9	58	Qualification for the Europa League first qualifying round
4	Maccabi Haifa	36	14	11	11	45	42	+3	53	Qualification for the Europa League second qualifying round (Note: Maccabi Haifa qualified for the Europa League second qualifying round by winning the 2015–16 Israel State Cup.)
5	Bnei Sakhnin	36	13	9	14	46	40	+6	48	
6	Hapoel Ra'anana	36	11	9	16	38	48	−10	42	

Source: Israel Football Association, Soccerway
Rules for classification: 1) Points; 2) Goal difference; 3) Matches won; 4) Goals scored; 5) Head-to-head points; 6) Head-to-head goal difference; 7) Head-to-head goals scored; 8) Play-off.
(C) Champions
Notes:

2015–16 Israeli Premier League champions

Hapoel Be'er Sheva
3rd title

==== Championship round results ====
Home \ Away	BEI	BnS	HBS	HRA	MHA	MTA
Beitar Jerusalem	—	0–3	0–2	1–0	3–2	0–2
Bnei Sakhnin	2–0	—	1–4	1–1	0–1	0–0
Hapoel Be'er Sheva	2–0	3–1	—	0–0	1–1	1–1
Hapoel Ra'anana	1–2	2–3	1–4	—	3–0	1–1
Maccabi Haifa	1–0	3–3	2–1	2–0	—	0–0
Maccabi Tel Aviv	3–2	1–0	0–0	3–0	6–0	—

Source: Israel Football Association
Legend: Blue = home team win; Yellow = draw; Red = away team win.

=== Relegation round ===
Key numbers for pairing determination (number marks position after 26 games):

Rounds
27th	28th	29th	30th	31st	32nd	33rd
7 – 11; 8 – 13; 9 – 12; 10 – 14	7 – 8; 13 – 9; 12 – 10; 11 – 14	8 – 11; 9 – 7; 10 – 13; 14 – 12	8 – 9; 7 – 10; 13 – 14; 11 – 12	9 – 11; 10 – 8; 14 – 7; 12 – 13	9 – 10; 8 – 14; 7 – 12; 11 – 13	10 – 11; 14 – 9; 12 – 8; 13 – 7

==== Relegation round table ====
Pos	Team	Pld	W	D	L	GF	GA	GD	Pts	Relegation
7	Maccabi Petah Tikva	33	13	7	13	34	35	−1	46	
8	Bnei Yehuda	33	13	7	13	37	43	−6	46	
9	Hapoel Tel Aviv	33	10	12	11	30	37	−7	42	
10	Hapoel Kfar Saba	33	9	11	13	23	37	−14	38	
11	Ironi Kiryat Shmona	33	8	12	13	32	39	−7	36	
12	Hapoel Haifa	33	7	13	13	38	48	−10	34	
13	Hapoel Acre (R)	33	9	7	17	27	48	−21	34	Relegation to Liga Leumit
14	Maccabi Netanya (R)	33	1	9	23	14	50	−36	12	Relegation to Liga Leumit

Source: Israel Football Association, Soccerway
Rules for classification: 1) Points; 2) Goal difference; 3) Matches won; 4) Goals scored; 5) Head-to-head points; 6) Head-to-head goal difference; 7) Head-to-head goals scored; 8) Play-off.
(R) Relegated

==== Relegation round results ====
Home \ Away	BnY	HAC	HHA	HKS	HTA	IKS	MNE	MPT
Bnei Yehuda	—	3–1	—	—	2–4	1–0	—	1–2
Hapoel Acre	—	—	2–3	—	—	1–1	4–1	1–3
Hapoel Haifa	1–1	—	—	0–0	—	—	2–1	—
Hapoel Kfar Saba	0–1	0–0	—	—	0–3	2–1	—	—
Hapoel Tel Aviv	—	1–0	3–3	—	—	—	—	0–0
Ironi Kiryat Shmona	—	—	2–1	—	1–1	—	2–0	—
Maccabi Netanya	0–1	—	—	1–1	0–1	—	—	—
Maccabi Petah Tikva	—	—	2–1	0–1	—	2–0	2–1	—

Source: Israel Football Association
Legend: Blue = home team win; Yellow = draw; Red = away team win.

== Positions by round ==
The table lists the positions of teams after each week of matches. Note that Championship round teams will play in 36 matchdays, and the Relegation round teams will compete in only 33 matches.

Team \ Round	1	2	3	4	5	6	7	8	9	10	11	12	13	14	15	16	17	18	19	20	21	22	23	24	25	26	27	28	29	30	31	32	33	34	35	36
Hapoel Be'er Sheva	2	7	3	2	7	3	2	1	1	1	2	2	2	2	1	1	1	1	1	1	1	1	1	1	1	1	1	1	1	2	1	1	1	1	1	1
Maccabi Tel Aviv	3	2	2	4	2	1	1	2	2	2	1	1	1	1	2	2	2	2	2	2	2	2	2	2	2	2	2	2	2	1	2	2	2	2	2	2
Beitar Jerusalem	8	10	9	12	10	5	7	5	3	3	3	3	3	3	3	3	3	3	3	3	3	3	3	3	3	3	3	3	3	3	3	3	3	3	3	3
Maccabi Haifa	14	14	14	14	14	14	14	12	11	13	11	8	6	6	6	6	6	6	5	6	5	5	5	6	6	4	4	6	6	5	5	5	5	4	4	4
Bnei Sakhnin	10	13	13	9	6	9	6	7	8	9	10	7	7	10	12	13	12	11	12	10	10	9	7	5	5	5	6	5	4	4	4	4	4	5	5	5
Hapoel Ra'anana	7	3	6	3	4	8	5	3	5	5	4	5	5	5	4	4	5	5	6	4	4	4	4	4	4	6	5	4	5	6	6	6	6	6	6	6
Maccabi Petah Tikva	5	1	1	1	1	2	4	6	6	7	5	4	4	4	5	5	4	4	4	5	6	7	9	8	8	8	8	7	7	8	8	7	7			
Bnei Yehuda	1	6	10	5	11	12	8	8	7	6	7	9	9	7	7	7	8	10	8	8	8	6	6	7	7	7	7	8	8	7	7	8	8			
Hapoel Tel Aviv	9	12	12	8	5	6	9	10	13	10	12	10	10	8	11	11	11	9	11	12	12	12	11	11	12	12	10	9	9	9	9	9	9			
Hapoel Kfar Saba	6	4	7	10	12	13	11	9	12	12	8	11	11	11	9	12	13	12	10	9	9	10	8	9	9	9	11	12	12	10	10	10	10			
Ironi Kiryat Shmona	13	5	5	7	9	4	3	4	4	4	6	6	8	9	8	8	7	7	7	7	7	8	10	10	10	10	12	11	11	11	12	11	11			
Hapoel Haifa	4	9	8	11	8	10	12	13	9	11	13	13	13	12	10	9	9	8	9	11	11	11	13	13	13	13	13	13	13	12	11	12	12			
Hapoel Acre	11	8	4	6	3	7	10	11	10	8	9	12	12	13	13	10	10	13	13	13	13	13	12	12	11	11	9	10	10	13	13	13	13			
Maccabi Netanya	12	11	11	13	13	11	13	14	14	14	14	14	14	14	14	14	14	14	14	14	14	14	14	14	14	14	14	14	14	14	14	14	14			

Source: Palestine Football Association

2016–17 UEFA Champions League Second qualifying round
2016–17 UEFA Europa League First qualifying round
Relegation to 2016–17 Liga Leumit

== Season statistics ==
=== Top scorers ===
Rank	Scorer	Club	Goals
1	(Israel) Eran Zahavi	Maccabi Tel Aviv	35
2	(Australia) Nikita Rukavytsya	Beitar Jerusalem	14
2	(Israel) Shlomi Azulay	Bnei Sakhnin	14
2	(Israel) Elyaniv Barda	Hapoel Be'er Sheva	14
5	(Zambia) Evans Kangwa	Hapoel Ra'anana	11
5	(Argentina) Pedro Joaquín Galván	Bnei Yehuda	11
5	(Nigeria) Anthony Nwakaeme	Hapoel Be'er Sheva	11
5	(Israel) Mahran Lala	Hapoel Haifa	11
9	(Israel) Eliran Atar	Maccabi Haifa	10
9	(Israel) Ofir Mizrahi	Ironi Kiryat Shmona	10
9	(Israel) Tal Ben Haim	Maccabi Tel Aviv	10

Source: Palestine Football Association

== Attendances ==
Pos	Team	Total	High	Low	Average	Change
1	Maccabi Haifa				20,826	n/a
2	Hapoel Be'er Sheva				15,941	n/a
3	Maccabi Tel Aviv				11,915	n/a
4	Beitar Jerusalem				10,416	n/a
5	Hapoel Tel Aviv				9,375	n/a
6	Hapoel Haifa				4,572	n/a
7	Maccabi Netanya				4,241	n/a
8	Bnei Yehuda				3,642	n/a
9	Maccabi Petah Tikva				3,462	n/a
10	Hapoel Kfar Saba				2,968	n/a
11	Bnei Sakhnin				2,805	n/a
12	Hapoel Ra'anana				2,305	n/a
13	Hapoel Acre				1,958	n/a
14	Ironi Kiryat Shmona				1,800	n/a
	League total				7,479	n/a

Updated to games played on 4 June 2016
Source: Official club websites and
