= 2014–15 Israeli Premier League =

Football season

Israeli Premier League
- Season: 2014–15
- Dates: 13 September 2014 – 1 June 2015
- Champions: Maccabi Tel Aviv (21st title)
- Relegated: F.C. Ashdod; Hapoel Petah Tikva
- Champions League: Maccabi Tel Aviv (2nd qualifying round)
- Europa League: Ironi Kiryat Shmona (3rd qualifying round); Hapoel Be'er Sheva (2nd qualifying round); Beitar Jerusalem (1st qualifying round)
- Matches: 240
- Goals: 604 (2.52 per match)
- Top goalscorer: Eran Zahavi (27 goals)
- Biggest home win: Maccabi Haifa 5–0 Ashdod (14 February 2015)
- Biggest away win: Maccabi Petah Tikva 0–4 Hapoel Be'er Sheva (25 October 2014); Maccabi Netanya 0–4 Maccabi Haifa (3 December 2014); Hapoel Haifa 0–4 Maccabi Haifa (14 December 2014)
- Highest scoring: Maccabi Netanya 4–4 Maccabi Petah Tikva (20 September 2014)
- Longest winning run: 5 games Ironi Kiryat Shmona
- Longest unbeaten run: 16 games Ironi Kiryat Shmona
- Longest winless run: 15 games F.C. Ashdod
- Longest losing run: 4 games F.C. Ashdod; Hapoel Tel Aviv; Maccabi Haifa; Ironi Kiryat Shmona
- Highest attendance: 29,300 - Maccabi Haifa 1–3 Beitar Jerusalem (27 December 2014)
- Average attendance: 6,451

The 2014–15 Israeli Premier League is the sixteenth season since its introduction in 1999 and the 73rd season of top-tier football in Israel. It began in the end of August 2014 and ended in May 2015. Maccabi Tel Aviv are the defending champions, having won their third Premier League title, and 20th championship last season.

Maccabi Tel Aviv became champions for the 21st time and 3rd consecutive time, and completed the first-ever treble in Israeli football, after winning the Cup and Toto Cup as well.

== Teams ==
Locations of the 2014–15 Israeli Premier League teams

A total of fourteen teams are competing in the league, including twelve sides from the 2013–14 season and two promoted team from the 2013–14 Liga Leumit.

Hapoel Nir Ramat HaSharon and Bnei Yehuda were relegated to the 2014–15 Liga Leumit after finishing the 2013–14 season in the bottom two places.

Maccabi Netanya and Hapoel Petah Tikva were promoted after finishing the 2013–14 Liga Leumit in the top two places.

=== Stadia and locations ===
Club	Home City	Stadium	Capacity
Beitar Jerusalem	Jerusalem	Teddy Stadium	31,733
Bnei Sakhnin	Sakhnin	Doha Stadium	8,500
F.C. Ashdod	Ashdod	Yud-Alef Stadium	7,800
Hapoel Acre	Acre	Acre Stadium	5,000
Hapoel Be'er Sheva	Be'er Sheva	Vasermil Stadium	13,000
Hapoel Haifa	Haifa	Sammy Ofer Stadium	30,950
Hapoel Petah Tikva	Petah Tikva	HaMoshava Stadium	11,500
Hapoel Ra'anana	Ra'anana	Netanya Stadium	13,610
Hapoel Tel Aviv	Tel Aviv	Bloomfield Stadium	14,413
Ironi Kiryat Shmona	Kiryat Shmona	Kiryat Shmona Stadium	5,300
Maccabi Haifa	Haifa	Sammy Ofer Stadium	30,950
Maccabi Netanya	Netanya	Netanya Stadium	13,610
Maccabi Petah Tikva	Petah Tikva	HaMoshava Stadium	11,500
Maccabi Tel Aviv	Tel Aviv	Bloomfield Stadium	14,413

Beitar Jerusalem	Hapoel Tel Aviv Maccabi Tel Aviv	Ironi Kiryat Shmona	
Teddy Stadium	Bloomfield Stadium	Kiryat Shmona Stadium	
Maccabi Netanya	Hapoel Haifa Maccabi Haifa	Maccabi Petah Tikva Hapoel Petah Tikva	
Netanya Stadium	Sammy Ofer Stadium	HaMoshava Stadium	
F.C. Ashdod	Bnei Sakhnin	Hapoel Be'er Sheva	Hapoel Acre
Yud-Alef Stadium	Doha Stadium	Vasermil Stadium	Acre Stadium

=== Personnel and sponsorship ===
Team	President	Manager	Captain	Kitmaker	Shirt sponsor
Beitar Jerusalem	(Israel) Eli Tabib	(Israel) Guy Levy	(Israel) Ofir Kriaf	Puma	itrader
Bnei Sakhnin	(Israel) Mohammed Abu Yunes	(Israel) Eli Cohen	(Israel) Khaled Khalaila	Umbro	Toyga
F.C. Ashdod	(Israel) Jacky Ben-Zaken	(Israel) Nir Klinger	(Israel) Ofir Martziano	Nike	
Hapoel Acre	(Israel) Yehuda Barshishat	(Israel) Shlomi Dora	(Israel) David Goresh	Macron	Azrieli Group
Hapoel Be'er Sheva	(Israel) Alona Barkat	(Israel) Elisha Levy	(Israel) Elyaniv Barda	Kappa	Mobli
Hapoel Haifa	(Israel) Yoav Katz	(Israel) Tal Banin	(Israel) Oshri Roash	Diadora	Hatama
Hapoel Petah Tikva	(Israel) Doron Ben Dakon	(Israel) Meni Koretski	(Israel) Kobi Musa	Lotto	
Hapoel Ra'anana	(Israel) Asher Alon	(Israel) Haim Silvas	(Israel) Snir Shuker	Umbro	ME Tel Aviv
Hapoel Tel Aviv	(Israel) The Red Fans	(Israel) Eli Cohen	(Israel) Shay Abutbul	Umbro	Fujicom
Ironi Kiryat Shmona	(Israel) Izzy Sheratzky	(Israel) Barak Bakhar	(Israel) Shir Tzedek	Puma	Ituran
Maccabi Haifa	(Israel) Ya'akov Shahar	(Israel) Marco Balbul	(Israel) Yossi Benayoun	Nike	Honda
Maccabi Netanya	(Israel) Eli Segev	(Israel) Ronny Levy	(Israel) Eran Levy	Joma	Burgus Burger Bar
Maccabi Petah Tikva	(Israel) Amos Luzon	(Israel) Ran Ben Shimon	(Israel) Naor Peser	Macron	Panorama North
Maccabi Tel Aviv	(Canada) Mitchell Goldhar	(Spain) Pako Ayestarán	(Israel) Sheran Yeini	Adidas	

=== Managerial changes ===
Team	Outgoing manager	Manner of departure	Date of vacancy	Position in table	Incoming manager	Date of appointment
Maccabi Haifa	(Israel) Arik Benado	Sacked	14 April 2014	Pre-season	(Serbia) Aleksandar Stanojević	1 May 2014
Beitar Jerusalem	(Israel) Ronny Levy	Sacked	10 May 2014	Pre-season	(Israel) Meni Koretski	10 May 2014
Hapoel Haifa	(Israel) Shlomi Dora	End of contract	14 May 2014	Pre-season	(Israel) Reuven Atar	14 May 2014
Hapoel Acre	(Israel) Yuval Naim	Sacked		Pre-season	(Israel) Alon Harazi	
Hapoel Tel Aviv	(Israel) Ran Ben Shimon	Sacked	26 May 2014	Pre-season	(Israel) Asi Domb	27 May 2014
Hapoel Ra'anana	(Israel) Meni Koretski	Resigned		Pre-season	(Israel) Haim Silvas	
Maccabi Tel Aviv	(Portugal) Paulo Sousa	Signed by Basel	28 May 2014	Pre-season	(Spain) Óscar García	2 June 2014
Maccabi Petah Tikva	(Israel) Yetav Luzon	Resigned	11 June 2014	Pre-season	(Israel) Ran Ben Shimon	12 June 2014
Bnei Sakhnin	(Israel) Marco Balbul	End of contract	19 June 2014	Pre-season	(Israel) Guy Levy	19 June 2014
Maccabi Tel Aviv	(Spain) Óscar García	Resigned	26 August 2014	Pre-season	(Spain) Pako Ayestarán	26 August 2014
Bnei Sakhnin	(Israel) Guy Levy	Sacked	5 December 2014	13th	(Israel) Eli Cohen	5 December 2014
Maccabi Haifa	(Serbia) Aleksandar Stanojević	Resigned	28 December 2014	4th	(Israel) Marco Balbul	28 December 2014
Hapoel Acre	(Israel) Alon Harazi	Resigned	5 January 2015	14th	(Israel) Shlomi Dora	8 January 2015
Maccabi Netanya	(Israel) Yossi Mizrahi	Resigned	14 January 2015	12th	(Israel) Ronny Levy	14 January 2015
Beitar Jerusalem	(Israel) Meni Koretski	Sacked	30 January 2015	10th	(Israel) Guy Levy	30 January 2015
Hapoel Tel Aviv	(Israel) Asi Domb	Sacked	30 January 2015	8th	(Israel) Eli Cohen	30 January 2015
Hapoel Petah Tikva	(Israel) Ido Bar-On	Sacked	7 February 2015	13th	(Israel) Meni Koretski	7 February 2015
Hapoel Haifa	(Israel) Reuven Atar	Sacked	16 February 2015	12th	(Israel) Tal Banin	16 February 2015

=== Foreign players ===
The number of foreign players is restricted to five per team.

Club	Player 1	Player 2	Player 3	Player 4	Player 5	Non-visa Foreign	Former Players
Beitar Jerusalem	(Brazil) Claudemir	(Romania) **Liviu Antal**	(Serbia) Dušan Matović	(Spain) César Arzo			(Montenegro) Žarko Korać
Bnie Sakhnin	(Brazil) **Diogo Kachuba**	(Croatia) Igor Jovanović	(Slovenia) Miha Mevlja			(Palestine) Ahmad Abu Nahyeh^{3}	(Greece) Giannis Papadopoulos (Serbia) Milan Bojović (Spain) Abraham Paz
F.C. Ashdod	(Democratic Republic of the Congo) Paty Yeye Lenkebe	(Nigeria) **Aliyu Abubakar**	(Nigeria) Juwon Oshaniwa	(Nigeria) Yero Bello	(Serbia) Aleksandar Davidov	(Argentina) **Nicolás Falczuk**^{2}	(Argentina) David Solari
Hapoel Acre	(Bosnia and Herzegovina) Emir Hadžić	(Brazil) Juliano Spadacio	(Greece) **Giannis Papadopoulos**	(Serbia) Branislav Jovanović			(Albania) Hamdi Salihi
Hapoel Be'er Sheva	(Brazil) William Soares	(Nigeria) Austin Ejide	(Nigeria) John Ogu	(Romania) Ovidiu Hoban	(Serbia) Tomislav Pajović	(Sweden) Joakim Askling^{2}	
Hapoel Haifa	(Albania) **Hamdi Salihi**	(Canada) Tosaint Ricketts	(Czech Republic) Přemysl Kovář	(Lithuania) Tadas Kijanskas	(Montenegro) **Žarko Korać**	(France) Steven Cohen^{2}	(Argentina) Darío Fernández (Ghana) Osei Mawuli^{2} (Lithuania) Mindaugas Kalonas
Hapoel Petah Tikva	(Cameroon) **Gaël Etock**	(Croatia) Mirko Oremuš	(Guinea) Sékou Condé	(Nigeria) Chimezie Mbah	(Nigeria) Michael Tukura	(Croatia) Tvrtko Kale^{2}	(Georgia (country)) Akaki Khubutia
Hapoel Ra'anana	(Nigeria) Anthony Nwakaeme	(Senegal) Mamadou Thiam	(Zambia) Emmanuel Mbola	(Zambia) Evans Kangwa			(Brazil) Pedro Sass
Hapoel Tel Aviv	(Armenia) **Apoula Edel**	(Brazil) Lucas Sasha	(Guinea-Bissau) **Amido Baldé**	(Netherlands) Jürgen Colin	(Nigeria) **Abonime Izogbu**		(Cameroon) Gaël Etock (Nigeria) Francis Benjamin (Nigeria) Harmony Ikande
Ironi Kiryat Shmona	(Brazil) Kassio	(Central African Republic) David Manga	(Lithuania) Mindaugas Panka	(Suriname) Touvarno Pinas	(Zambia) Rodgers Kola		
Maccabi Haifa	(Serbia) Vladimir Stojković	(Sierra Leone) **Medo**	(Spain) **Abraham Paz**	(Spain) Míchel	(Spain) Rubén Rayos		(Bosnia and Herzegovina) Edin Cocalić (Cameroon) Mohamadou Idrissou
Maccabi Netanya	(Brazil) Romário Pires	(Nigeria) Olarenwaju Kayode	(Romania) Cristian Sîrghi	(Romania) Gabriel Giurgiu			(Brazil) Dudu Cearense
Maccabi Petah Tikva	(Argentina) **David Solari**	(Bulgaria) Daniel Dimov	(Bulgaria) Kostadin Hazurov	(Croatia) Ivan Herceg	(Democratic Republic of the Congo) Joachim Mununga	(United States) Bryan Gerzicich^{1}	(Argentina) Nicolás Falczuk^{2} (Russia) Alan Gatagov
Maccabi Tel Aviv	(Nigeria) Nosa Igiebor	(Serbia) Nikola Mitrović	(Spain) Carlos García	(Spain) Juan Pablo	(Sweden) Rade Prica		

In bold: Players that join the club mid-season

In Italic: Players that left the club mid-season

The following do not fill a Visa position:
^{1}Players who were born and started their professional career abroad but have since gained an Israeli passport or permanent residency, allowing them to play with Israeli status;
^{2}Players who were born and started their professional career abroad but are eligible for Israeli citizenship due to Jewish ancestry;

^{3}Israeli citizens who have chosen to represent another national team;

== Regular season ==
=== Table ===
Pos	Team	Pld	W	D	L	GF	GA	GD	Pts	Qualification
1	Maccabi Tel Aviv (Note: Maccabi Tel Aviv and Hapoel Tel Aviv each deducted one point.)	26	17	5	4	53	20	+33	54	Qualification for the championship round
2	Hapoel Be'er Sheva	26	14	7	5	47	24	+23	49	Qualification for the championship round
3	Ironi Kiryat Shmona	26	13	8	5	40	27	+13	47	Qualification for the championship round
4	Beitar Jerusalem	26	10	10	6	38	29	+9	40	Qualification for the championship round
5	Maccabi Petah Tikva	26	10	9	7	28	30	−2	39	Qualification for the championship round
6	Maccabi Haifa	26	11	4	11	38	29	+9	37	Qualification for the championship round
7	Hapoel Ra'anana	26	9	7	10	24	23	+1	34	Qualification for the relegation round
8	Maccabi Netanya	26	9	6	11	37	45	−8	33	Qualification for the relegation round
9	Bnei Sakhnin	26	7	9	10	32	37	−5	30	Qualification for the relegation round
10	Hapoel Tel Aviv	26	8	7	11	27	33	−6	29	Qualification for the relegation round
11	F.C. Ashdod	26	6	9	11	29	41	−12	27	Qualification for the relegation round
12	Hapoel Haifa	26	7	5	14	20	41	−21	26	Qualification for the relegation round
13	Hapoel Petah Tikva	26	5	8	13	28	43	−15	23	Qualification for the relegation round
14	Hapoel Acre	26	4	10	12	20	39	−19	22	Qualification for the relegation round

Source: Israel Football Association
Rules for classification: 1) Points; 2) Goal difference; 3) Matches won; 4) Goals scored; 5) Head-to-head points; 6) Head-to-head goal difference; 7) Head-to-head goals scored; 8) Play-off.

=== Results ===
Home \ Away	BEI	BnS	ASH	HAC	HBS	HHA	IKS	HPT	HRA	HTA	MHA	MNE	MPT	MTA
Beitar Jerusalem	—	1–2	1–1	4–0	0–3	0–1	3–1	3–1	0–0	1–1	1–0	1–1	2–3	1–0
Bnei Sakhnin	1–0	—	2–3	1–1	2–0	2–0	1–4	0–0	2–0	1–1	1–1	0–2	1–1	1–3
F.C. Ashdod	3–3	2–2	—	0–0	2–2	0–1	0–0	1–3	1–2	3–1	1–0	2–3	0–0	0–1
Hapoel Acre	1–1	1–3	0–1	—	1–1	1–1	2–0	1–1	0–2	1–0	0–0	1–2	0–2	1–4
Hapoel Be'er Sheva	1–1	2–0	2–1	3–0	—	4–0	2–1	2–1	0–1	1–0	2–0	4–0	1–0	3–2
Hapoel Haifa	3–4	0–3	0–2	1–0	1–1	—	1–2	1–1	1–0	1–1	0–4	3–2	0–1	2–0
Ironi Kiryat Shmona	1–1	1–1	1–0	2–2	1–1	1–0	—	3–2	1–1	3–0	0–1	3–1	3–0	2–1
Hapoel Petah Tikva	0–1	2–1	1–2	4–1	1–3	2–1	1–3	—	0–0	0–1	2–2	1–1	0–0	1–3
Hapoel Ra'anana	0–2	1–1	2–0	0–2	1–1	2–0	0–0	4–0	—	0–1	1–0	2–1	0–0	0–2
Hapoel Tel Aviv	0–2	1–1	3–1	1–3	3–2	3–0	0–1	0–0	2–1	—	2–2	1–0	1–2	0–0 (Note: The match originally was abandoned after supporter violence while the score was 1–1. The Israel Football Association declared the match a 0–0 draw, with neither team receiving any points and closing the stands for four matches.)
Maccabi Haifa	1–3	4–2	5–0	1–0	1–0	2–0	1–3	3–1	0–2	3–1	—	2–1	0–1	0–1
Maccabi Netanya	2–0	2–1	0–0	1–1	4–2	0–2	1–2	3–1	1–0	0–2	0–4	—	4–4	3–3
Maccabi Petah Tikva	1–1	2–0	1–1	0–0	0–4	0–0	3–0	1–2	3–2	2–1	1–0	0–1	—	0–3
Maccabi Tel Aviv	1–1	2–0	5–2	3–0	0–0	3–0	1–1	2–0	2–0	2–0	3–1	3–1	3–0	—

Source: Israel Football Association
Legend: Blue = home team win; Yellow = draw; Red = away team win.

== Playoffs ==
Key numbers for pairing determination (number marks position after 26 games):

Rounds
27th	28th	29th	30th	31st	32nd	33rd	34th	35th	36th
1 – 6; 2 – 5; 3 – 4	1 – 2; 5 – 3; 6 – 4	2 – 6; 3 – 1; 4 – 5	1 – 4; 2 – 3; 6 – 5	3 – 6; 4 – 2; 5 – 1	6 – 1; 5 – 2; 4 – 3	2 – 1; 3 – 5; 4 – 6	6 – 2; 1 – 3; 5 – 4	3 – 2; 4 – 1; 5 – 6	6 – 3; 2 – 4; 1 – 5
7 – 11; 8 – 13; 9 – 12; 10 – 14	7 – 8; 13 – 9; 12 – 10; 11 – 14	8 – 11; 9 – 7; 10 – 13; 14 – 12	8 – 9; 7 – 10; 13 – 14; 11 – 12	9 – 11; 10 – 8; 14 – 7; 12 – 13	9 – 10; 8 – 14; 7 – 12; 11 – 13	10 – 11; 14 – 9; 12 – 8; 13 – 7			

=== Top playoff ===
==== Table ====
Pos	Team	Pld	W	D	L	GF	GA	GD	Pts	Qualification
1	Maccabi Tel Aviv (Note: Maccabi Tel Aviv and Beitar Jerusalem each deducted one point.) (C)	36	21	9	6	67	32	+35	70	Qualification for the Champions League second qualifying round
2	Ironi Kiryat Shmona	36	18	10	8	53	38	+15	64	Qualification for the Europa League third qualifying round (Note: Since Maccabi Tel Aviv won the 2014–15 Israel State Cup, then the 2nd-positioned team will be awarded with entry to the third qualifying round of the UEFA Europa League.)
3	Hapoel Be'er Sheva	36	17	11	8	63	40	+23	62	Qualification for the Europa League second qualifying round
4	Beitar Jerusalem	36	13	13	10	48	43	+5	51	Qualification for the Europa League first qualifying round
5	Maccabi Haifa	36	14	8	14	51	37	+14	50	
6	Maccabi Petah Tikva	36	12	12	12	34	41	−7	48	

Source: Israel Football Association
Rules for classification: 1) Points; 2) Goal difference; 3) Matches won; 4) Goals scored; 5) Head-to-head points; 6) Head-to-head goal difference; 7) Head-to-head goals scored; 8) Play-off.
(C) Champions

==== Results ====
Home \ Away	BEI	HBS	IKS	MHA	MPT	MTA
Beitar Jerusalem	—	1–1	0–1	1–1	0–0	3–0
Hapoel Be'er Sheva	4–0	—	2–2	1–1	3–0	1–1
Ironi Kiryat Shmona	1–2	3–1	—	1–0	2–0	0–0
Maccabi Haifa	1–0	4–0	4–1	—	0–0	1–1
Maccabi Petah Tikva	1–2	1–2	0–1	1–0	—	1–1
Maccabi Tel Aviv	4–1	3–1	2–1	2–1	0–2	—

Source: Israel Football Association
Legend: Blue = home team win; Yellow = draw; Red = away team win.

=== Bottom playoff ===
==== Table ====
Pos	Team	Pld	W	D	L	GF	GA	GD	Pts	Relegation
7	Bnei Sakhnin	33	11	11	11	43	44	−1	44	
8	Hapoel Tel Aviv (Note: Hapoel Tel Aviv deducted one point.)	33	12	8	13	36	40	−4	42	
9	Maccabi Netanya	33	11	8	14	46	54	−8	41	
10	Hapoel Ra'anana	33	10	9	14	35	36	−1	39	
11	Hapoel Acre	33	9	11	13	28	42	−14	38	
12	Hapoel Haifa	33	9	7	17	25	47	−22	34	
13	Hapoel Petah Tikva (R)	33	8	8	17	43	59	−16	32	Relegation to Liga Leumit
14	F.C. Ashdod (R)	33	6	13	14	32	51	−19	31	Relegation to Liga Leumit

Source: Israel Football Association
Rules for classification: 1) Points; 2) Goal difference; 3) Matches won; 4) Goals scored; 5) Head-to-head points; 6) Head-to-head goal difference; 7) Head-to-head goals scored; 8) Play-off.
(R) Relegated

==== Results ====
Home \ Away	ASH	BnS	HAC	HHA	HPT	HRA	HTA	MNE
F.C. Ashdod	—	—	0–0	0–0	2–4	—	—	—
Bnei Sakhnin	1–1	—	—	1–0	—	1–1	2–0	—
Hapoel Acre	—	1–0	—	1–0	—	2–0	—	—
Hapoel Haifa	—	—	—	—	3–2	—	0–1	0–0
Hapoel Petah Tikva	—	2–3	0–2	—	—	4–2	—	—
Hapoel Ra'anana	4–0	—	—	1–2	—	—	2–2	1–2
Hapoel Tel Aviv	1–0	—	2–0	—	1–2	—	—	2–1
Maccabi Netanya	0–0	2–3	1–2	—	3–1	—	—	—

Source: Israel Football Association
Legend: Blue = home team win; Yellow = draw; Red = away team win.

== Season statistics ==
=== Top scorers ===
As of matches played on 1 June 2015.

Rank	Scorer	Club	Goals
1	(Israel) Eran Zahavi	Maccabi Tel Aviv	27
2	(Israel) Mohammad Ghadir	Bnei Sakhnin	16
3	(Israel) Maor Buzaglo	Hapoel Be'er Sheva	13
3	(Nigeria) Olarenwaju Kayode	Maccabi Netanya	13
5	(Israel) Roi Kahat	Ironi Kiryat Shmona	12
6	(Israel) Shlomi Arbeitman	Hapoel Be'er Sheva	11
6	(Albania) Hamdi Salihi	Hapoel Haifa	11
6	(Zambia) Rodgers Kola	Ironi Kiryat Shmona	11
6	(Israel) Eran Levy	Maccabi Netanya	11

Source: Israel Football Association

== Attendances ==
No.	Club	Average attendance	Change	Highest
1	Maccabi Haifa	23,439	155,7%	30,200
2	Maccabi Tel Aviv	12,958	7,7%	28,000
3	Beitar Jerusalem	9,922	25,1%	23,000
4	Hapoel Tel Aviv	8,200	-17,4%	15,000
5	Hapoel Be'er-Sheva	7,711	9,3%	27,000
6	Maccabi Netanya	5,062	62,7%	11,000
7	Hapoel Haifa	4,853	35,9%	23,000
8	Hapoel Petah Tikva	4,576	110,4%	11,000
9	Maccabi Petah Tikva	3,318	23,7%	9,000
10	Hapoel Acre	2,726	10,1%	6,120
11	Hapoel Ironi Kiryat Shmona	2,617	11,7%	5,000
12	Bnei Sakhnin	2,565	-21,4%	7,000
13	Ashdod	2,447	22,6%	5,000
14	Hapoel Ra'anana	1,894	9,0%	5,800

== See also ==
- 2014–15 Israel State Cup
- 2014–15 Israel Super Cup
- 2014–15 Israel Toto Cup
