= Tretiak =

Tretiak or Tretyak (Russian: Третья́к or Третьяк; Ukrainian: Третяк or Трет`як) is a gender-neutral Slavic surname. It may refer to:

- Ivan Tretyak (1923-2007), Soviet general
- Józef Tretiak (1841–1923), Polish writer
- Sergiy Tretyak (born 1984), Ukrainian association football player
- Serhiy Tretyak (born 1963), Ukrainian association football player
- Maksym Tretyak (born 1984), Ukrainian boxer
- Maxim Tretiak (born 1996), Russian ice hockey goaltender, grandson of Vladislav
- Vladislav Tretiak (born 1952), Soviet ice hockey goaltender
- Vladyslav Tretiak (born 1980), Ukrainian sabre fencer
