= Giannis Papadopoulos (footballer, born 1989) =

Greek former footballer

Giannis Papadopoulos Γιάννης Παπαδόπουλος
Personal information
- Full name: Ioannis Papadopoulos
- Date of birth: 9 March 1989 (age 37)
- Place of birth: Thessaloniki, Greece
- Height: 1.77 m (5 ft 9 1/2 in)
- Position: Midfielder

Youth career
- Iraklis

Senior career*
Years	Team	Apps	(Gls)
2006–2008	Iraklis	25	(1)
2008–2011	Olympiacos	31	(1)
2011–2013	Dynamo Dresden	33	(0)
2013–2014	Aris	16	(0)
2014	Cracovia	11	(2)
2014–2015	Bnei Sakhnin	17	(2)
2015	Hapoel Acre	12	(2)
2015–2016	Hapoel Kfar Saba	21	(2)
2016–2017	Veria	7	(0)
2017–2018	Nea Salamina	21	(0)
2018–2019	Iraklis	5	(0)
2019	Digenis Morphou	4	(0)
2020	Rodos	8	(1)
2020–2021	Iraklis	8	(2)

International career
2007–2008	Greece U19	9	(2)
2010–2011	Greece U21	11	(1)
2010	Greece	1	(0)
Medal record
Men's football
Representing Greece
UEFA European Under-19 Championship
Runner-up	2007 Austria
- * Club domestic league appearances and goals

Giannis Papadopoulos (Greek: Γιάννης Παπαδόπουλος; born 9 March 1989) is a Greek former professional footballer who played as a midfielder.

He was the captain of the Greece under-19 team. He played in a central midfield role predominantly, although he was capable of playing as a left midfielder and also as an attacking midfielder.

== Club career ==
=== Iraklis ===
Papadopoulos started out his career at Iraklis as a trainee. His second season was a very impressive one, catching the eye of major Greek clubs in 2007–08, which eventually earned him a move to Olympiacos on 3 June 2008. The transfer fee was thought to be around 800,000 euros.

=== Olympiacos ===
On 5 October 2008, Papadopoulos became a man as he made his Olympiacos debut as a substitute for teammate Dudu Cearense against rivals AEK Athens. He impressed, having played a creative role in the second goal of Olympiakos' 2–0 win.

=== Dynamo Dresden ===
After he had terminated his contract with Olympiacos in July 2011, he moved to Dynamo Dresden. On 12 August 2011, he made his debut in a 4–0 home win over Union Berlin. His first year in 2. Bundesliga was an impressive one having 24 appearances, 15 as a starter. However, he spent most of the 2012–13 season as a substitute, therefore after he had terminated his contract with Dynamo Dresden in July 2013.

=== Aris ===
Shortly after, Papadopoulos signed a one-year contract with Aris. He made his debut with the club on 18 August in an away loss against Apollon Smyrnis. In early 2014, Papadopoulos had informed his coach Soulis Papadopoulos for his intention to leave the club due to serious economic problems, which resulted in him not appearing in the starting line-up for a home game against OFI.

=== Cracovia ===
On 1 March 2014, he signed a one-and-a-half-year contract with the Polish club Cracovia. He made his debut with the club on 17 March in a 1–0 home win against Jagiellonia Białystok and a week later he scored the only goal in a 1–1 away draw against Podbeskidzie Bielsko-Biała. At the end of the 2013–14 season, Cracovia announced the end of cooperation with the Greek midfielder due to financial disagreements.

=== Career in Israel ===
On 11 July 2014, Papadopoulos signed a one-year contract with the Israeli football club Bnei Sakhnin F.C. playing for Israeli Premier League. In February 2015, he signed for the rest of the season with the Israeli club Hapoel Acre.

During this period Hapoel Acre began to show a different face making a championship rally, as in the next nine games, managed to lose only from Hapoel Tel Aviv counting 5 wins and 4 draws. Papadopoulos described as "multi-tool" from the sports press, as in addition to defensive midfielder role in the game, he could play both as central back as well as an attacking midfielder, and with his goals helped his team in that achievement. As a result of this outstanding performance one of the biggest sports' sites in the country («sports.walla») indicate that his acquisition was crucial for the club, a fact that is also acknowledged from the team coach, Shlomi Dora, who in an interview he gave on the same site asked what were the five key moments of the year and of course stated that the acquisition of the Papadopoulos is one of them. "I had seen Yiannis several times at Bnei Sakhnin F.C. and I think he is an excellent player, so when his contract expired, we moved immediately for his acquisition and we have not been disappointed" he said among others.

On 16 July 2015 signed to Hapoel Kfar Saba On 20 December 2015, he scored his first goal in the season, helping his club to escape with a 1–1 draw against Maccabi Haifa. On 30 April 2016, he scored with an incredible left kick in a 2–1 home win against Ironi Kiryat Shmona.

=== Veria ===
On 2 August 2016, he signed a year contract with Greek club Veria for an undisclosed fee, returning to Super League Greece after 2,5 years.

=== Nea Salamina ===
On 21 June 2017, he signed a two years contract with Cypriot club Nea Salamina for an undisclosed fee.

=== Iraklis ===
On 28 July 2018, newly promoted side Iraklis announced the signing of Papadopoulos.

=== Rodos ===
In January 2020, Papadopoulos moved to Rodos FC.

== International career ==
He was a member of the Greece under-21s and captain of the U19 team.

== Personal life ==
Papadopoulos is the son of Iraklis all-time leader in appearances Daniil Papadopoulos.

== Honours ==
=== Olympiacos ===
- Super League Greece: 2008–09, 2010–11
- Greek Cup: 2008–09
