= Nicolás Falczuk =

Argentine footballer

Nicolás Falczuk ניקולאס פלצ'וק
Personal information
- Full name: Nicolás Gastón Falczuk
- Date of birth: 16 November 1986 (age 39)
- Place of birth: Argentina
- Height: 1.76 m (5 ft 9 1/2 in)
- Positions: Midfielder; striker

Senior career*
Years	Team	Apps	(Gls)
2007–2008	Deportivo Morón	25	(1)
2008–2009	Club Atlético Temperley	38	(5)
2009–2010	Deportivo Morón	35	(5)
2010–2012	Hapoel Acre	53	(14)
2012–2014	Hapoel Be'er Sheva	41	(4)
2014–2015	Maccabi Petah Tikva	4	(0)
2015	Ironi Ashdod	9	(0)
2015–2016	Hapoel Ramat Gan	18	(3)
2016–2018	Hapoel Nazareth Illit	39	(4)
2018	→ Hapoel Iksal (loan)	11	(1)
2018–2019	Hapoel Migdal HaEmek	24	(1)
- * Club domestic league appearances and goals

Nicolás Gastón Falczuk (Hebrew: ניקולאס פלצ'וק; born 16 November 1986) is a former Argentine-Israeli professional association football.

== Playing career ==
Falczuk put pen to paper on 4 August 2010 after impressing in a pre-season camp in Slovenia. Hapoel Acre have announced that they will work on getting Falczuk Israeli citizenship via the Law of Return for people of Jewish background.
