= Dimaku Fidelis =

Nigerian footballer

Personal information
- Full name: Dimaku Fidelis Tochukwu
- Date of birth: 22 April 1989 (age 37)
- Place of birth: Lagos, Nigeria
- Height: 1.84 m (6 ft 0 in)
- Position: Defender

Team information
- Current team: Hapoel Acre F.C.
- Number: 25

Youth career
- 2004–2006: Ajuwale F.C
- 2007: Beitar Jerusalem F.C.

Senior career*
Years	Team	Apps	(Gls)
2008–2010	Ramat Hasharon	57	(5)
2010–2013	Hapoel Acre F.C.	70	(2)

International career
2012–	Nigeria	3	(0)
- * Club domestic league appearances and goals

Dimaku Fidelis Tochukwu (born 22 April 1989, in Lagos) is a Nigerian footballer who played as a defender for Hapoel Acre F.C.

== Club career ==
Fidelis played in the Ironi Nir Ramat HaSharon of the second division in Israel; after playing for the youth team of Beitar Jerusalem. He spent 2 successful years before signing for Hapoel Acre F.C. in the Israel Premier League.

On August 21, 2011 it was reported in Israeli media that Fidelis was moving to Serbian champions Partizan Belgrade, but the president of Hapoel Acre dismissed the reports, refusing to sell the player.

== International career ==
He played 3 games for the dream team of Nigeria in the 2011 CAF U-23 Championship unfortunately they did not qualify for the Olympics.
