= Yuval Naim =

Israeli footballer (born 1967)

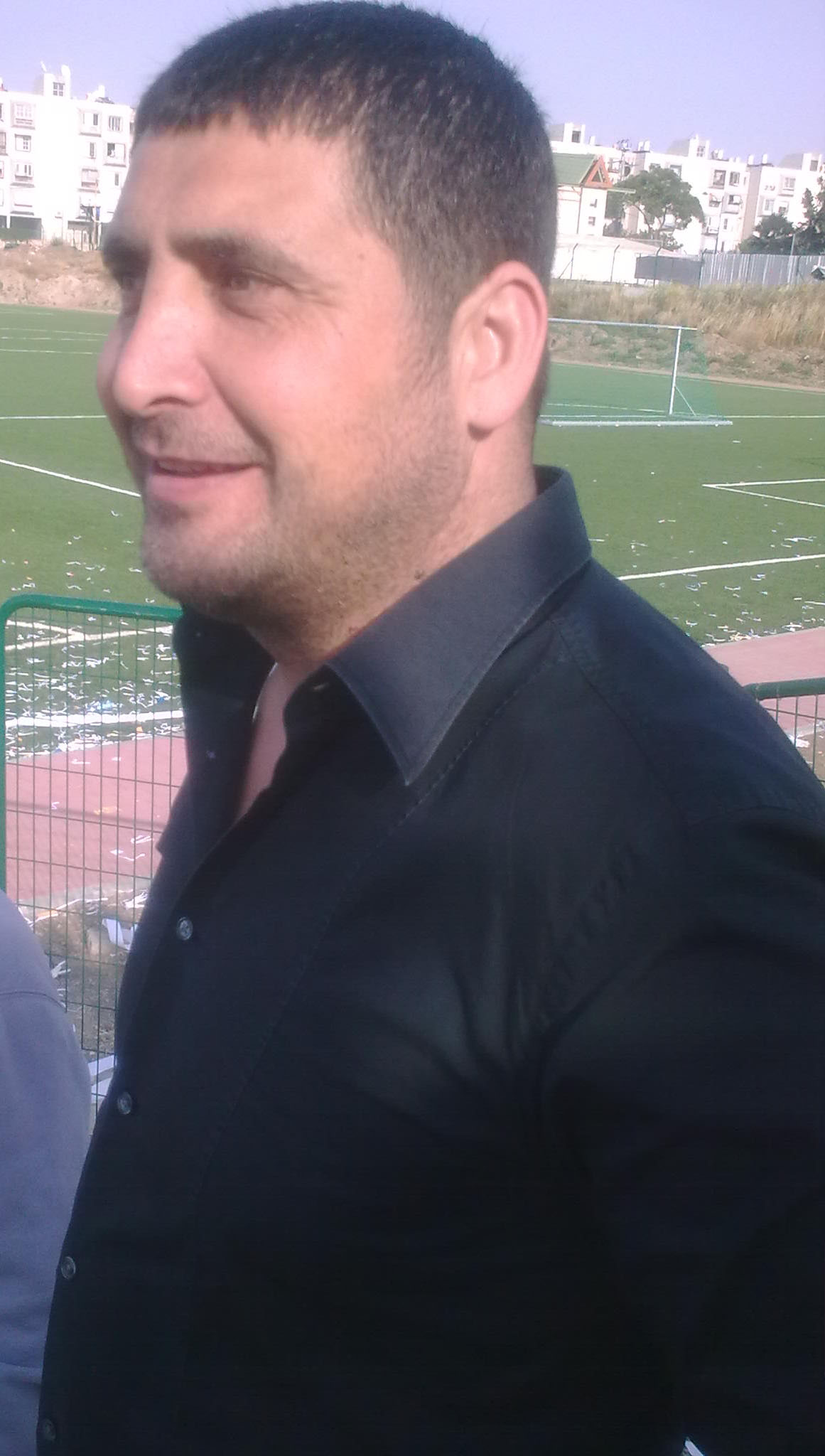

Personal information
- Date of birth: 22 November 1967 (age 58)
- Place of birth: Ramat Gan, Israel
- Position: Centre-back

Team information
- Current team: Hapoel Ashdod

Youth career
- Hapoel Ramat Gan

Senior career*
| Years | Team | Apps | (Gls) |
| 1986–1993 | Hapoel Ramat Gan | | |
| 1993–1994 | Hapoel Tzafririm Holon | | |
| 1994–1996 | Hapoel Ramat Gan | | |
| 1996–1998 | Bnei Yehuda | 32 | (1) |
| 1998 | Hakoah Ramat Gan | | |
| 1998–1999 | Hapoel Or Yehuda | | |
| 1999–2001 | Maccabi Ramat Amidar | | |

Managerial career
- 2001–2004: Maccabi Ramat Amidar
- 2005–2010: Hapoel Ramat Gan
- 2010: Bnei Sakhnin
- 2010–2011: Hapoel Petah Tikva
- 2011–2012: Beitar Jerusalem
- 2013–2014: Hapoel Acre
- 2014–2018: Hapoel Ashkelon
- 2018–2019: F.C. Ashdod
- 2019–2021: Hapoel Ashdod
- 2021–2022: Shimshon Kafr Qasim
- 2023: Hapoel Rishon LeZion
- 2023–: Sektzia Ness Ziona
- * Club domestic league appearances and goals

Yuval Naim (Hebrew: יובל נעים; born 22 November 1967) is an Israeli football manager and former player.

== Playing career ==
Yuval Naim grew up and played as a centre back in the youth academy of Hapoel Ramat Gan and in the mid-80's he was selected to the senior squad, where he received the number 5, and in 1989, he was a partner in their promotion to Liga Leumit, first division at the time. However, after just one season they been relegated to the second tier.

In 1993, he left Hapoel Ramat Gan and went to play with Hapoel Tzafririm Holon. and in the end of that season they dropped to the third tier for the first time in its history. Naim helped the team return to Liga Leumit and played for another two years. His last game against Hapoel Tayibe, stopped with 20 minutes left on the clock with his team in 2–0 lead, and the claim being he rammed the linesman nose, following the incident he was banned until the end of that season.

In the summer of 1996 he moved to Bnei Yehuda and one season later, he moved the Hakoah Ramat Gan. Later he also played for Hapoel Or Yehuda and Maccabi Amidar Ramat Gan, and in 2001, at age 34, he retired from active playing.

== Managerial career ==
After retiring Naim was appointed manager of Maccabi Ramat Amidar and has recorded success in his first season as the team promoted to the Liga Artzit division. Naim went on to manage Amidar for three more years, and after the merger of Hakoah Tel Aviv and Maccabi Ramat Amidar, in summer of 2005 he served as the scout of the new merged club Hakoah Amidar Ramat Gan.

After seven rounds in the 2005–06 season, he became the manager of a childhood club, Hapoel Ramat Gan, and managed to keep the team in the Liga Artzit despite a gap of 13 points from the relegation zone. The following season he helped promoted the team to Liga Leumit, and in 2009 under his guidance they were promoted to the Israeli Premier League after 19 years absence. The 2009–10 season, the team finished in the 14th place and ended up played in the Relegation Play-off match against Hapoel Kfar Saba of Liga Leumit, where they won.

In the Summer of 2010, Naim left Hapoel Ramat Gan and moved to Bnei Sakhnin but after several weeks he was sacked from the team before beginning of the season. He then appointed manager of Hapoel Petah Tikva and in April 2011, after an ongoing dispute with Tomer Sinai, one of the club owners, he was sacked from the club.

In June 2011, he was arrested together with his friend Ben Cohen, as part of police investigation, on suspicion of blackmail threats of Gal Hazor, Hapoel Petah Tikva club owner.

On 17 August 2011, Naim was appointed manager of Beitar Jerusalem.

On 31 January 2013, Naim was appointed manager of Hapoel Acre.

In July 2014, Naim was appointed manager of Hapoel Ashkelon. In his first season with the club he won promotion as the Liga Alef champion. The following season he finished with Ashkelon as the runner up of Liga Leumit and won promotion to the Premier League.

== Personal life ==
Naim is of a Tunisian-Jewish descent. His niece, May Naim, was murdered during the Nova music festival massacre.

== Honours ==
As manager

- Liga Alef (1):
  - 2001–02
- Liga Artzit (1):
  - 2006–07
- Toto Cup Artzit (2):
  - 2005–06, 2006–07
