= Józef Tretiak =

Polish writer

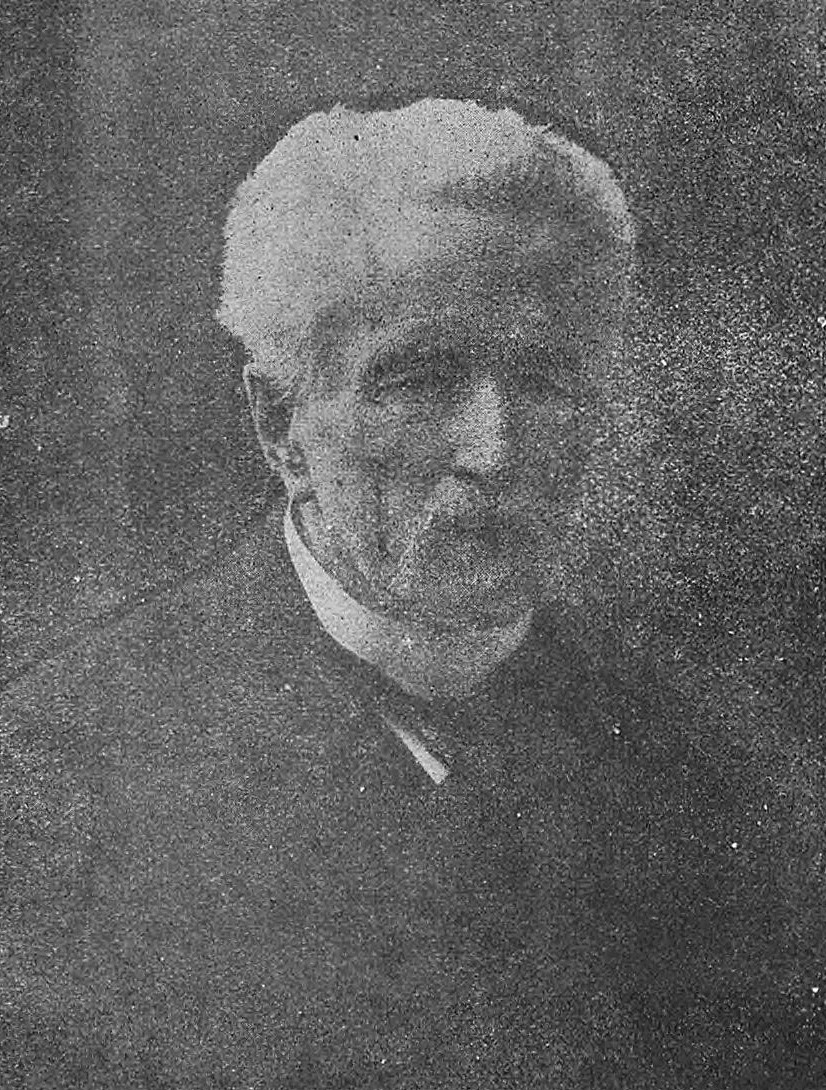
Józef Tretiak (-1923)

Józef Tretiak (28 September 1841 – 18 March 1923) was a Polish writer.

Tretiak wrote a major critical biography of Józef Bohdan Zaleski (3 vols, 1911, 1913, 1914).
