= Tzvika Tzemah =

Israeli football coach

Tzvika Tzemah צביקה צמח
Personal information
- Full name: Tzvika Tzemah
- Place of birth: Israel

Managerial career
- Years: Team
- 2004–2008: Ironi Ramat HaSharon
- 2010: Hapoel Ra'anana
- 2010–2011: Hapoel Ramat Gan

Tzvika Tzemah (Hebrew: צביקה צמח) is an Israeli football coach. He had coached three clubs: Hapoel Nir Ramat HaSharon F.C. (2004-08), Hapoel Ra'anana A.F.C. (2010), and Hapoel Ramat Gan Givatayim F.C. (2010-11).
