= Haim Levy =

Israeli footballer

Haim Levy חיים לוי
Personal information
- Date of birth: 8 February 1960 (age 66)
- Place of birth: Netanya, Israel

Team information
- Current team: Hapoel Ashdod (manager)

Senior career*
Years	Team	Apps	(Gls)
1979–1982	Hapoel Netanya		
1982–1983	Hapoel Kfar Saba		
1985–1986	Maccabi Netanya		
1986–1987	Beitar Netanya		
1991–1992	Hapoel Haifa		
1992–1993	Maccabi Ironi Ashdod		

Managerial career
- Hapoel Tayibe
- 2003–2005: Hapoel Acre
- 2005: Hapoel Ra'anana
- 2005–2006: Maccabi Netanya (U19)
- 2006–2007: Hapoel Herzliya
- 2007: Hapoel Acre
- 2008–2009: Hapoel Nir Ramat HaSharon
- 2010: Bnei Sakhnin
- 2012–2013: Maccabi Ironi Kfar Yona
- 2013: Maccabi Umm al-Fahm
- 2014: Hapoel Morasha Ramat HaSharon
- 2015–2016: Hapoel Beit She'an
- 2016–2017: Maccabi Kiryat Gat
- 2018: Maccabi Ironi Kiryat Ata
- 2018–2019: Hapoel Migdal HaEmek
- 2019: Hapoel Acre
- 2019: Hapoel Ashdod
- 2020: Maccabi Herzliya
- 2020–2021: Hapoel Migdal HaEmek
- 2021: F.C. Tira
- 2022: Hapoel Ramat HaSharon
- 2022–: Hapoel Ashdod
- * Club domestic league appearances and goals

Haim Levy (Hebrew: חיים לוי; born 1961) is an Israeli football manager and former player who manages Hapoel Ashdod.

== Playing career ==
Levy started his career in the Hapoel Netanya. In the 1991–92 season he played for Hapoel Haifa and achieved promotion to the first division. In the 1992–93 season Levy played For Maccabi Ironi Ashdod and was promoted to the first division.

== Managerial career ==
After retiring as a player, Levy became a manager. He managed Bnei Sakhnin in the First League in 2010.

He went on to manage clubs in the second division and in Liga Alef.

On 1 December 2016, Levy was appointed coach of Maccabi Kiryat Gat of Liga Alef South.
