= Serhiy Tretyak (footballer, born 1984) =

Ukrainian footballer

Serhiy Tretyak Сергій Третяк
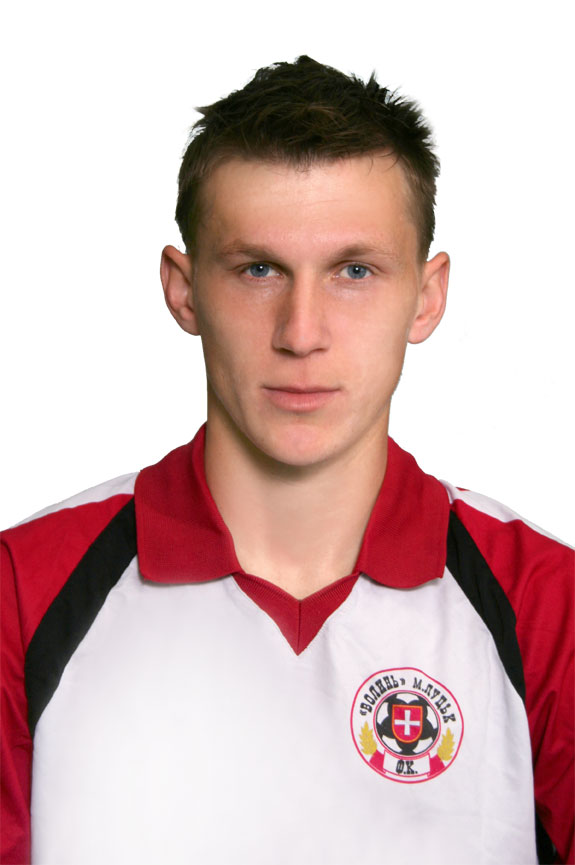

Personal information
- Full name: Serhiy Viktorovych Tretyak
- Date of birth: 28 November 1984 (age 41)
- Place of birth: Kyiv, Ukrainian SSR
- Height: 1.74 m (5 ft 9 in)
- Position: Striker

Youth career
- 1998–2001: FC Knyazha Shchaslyve

Senior career*
Years	Team	Apps	(Gls)
2001–2003	FC Borysfen Boryspil	10	(0)
2001–2003	→ FC Borysfen-2 Boryspil	27	(8)
2002	→ FC Arsenal Kyiv (loan)	0	(0)
2003–2005	FC Obolon Kyiv	14	(1)
2003–2005	→ FC Obolon-2 Kyiv	26	(2)
2003	→ FC Krasyliv-Obolon	5	(0)
2005–2006	FC Stal Alchevsk	13	(0)
2007	FC Volyn Lutsk	14	(1)
2008	FC Poltava	12	(2)
2009	FC CSKA Kyiv	11	(1)
2011–2012	Maccabi Netanya F.C.	30	(8)
2014	Maccabi Yavne F.C.	16	(1)
2015–2016	Lyubomyr Stavyshche (amateurs)	75	(84)
2017–2018	FC Merani Martvili	44	(22)
2018	FC Sioni Bolnisi	8	(0)
- * Club domestic league appearances and goals as of 27 September 2018

Serhiy Tretyak (Ukrainian: Сергій Вікторович Третяк; born 28 November 1984) is a Ukrainian footballer.

He spent his career in the Ukrainian and Israeli football clubs.

== Statistics ==
Club performance			League		Cup		League Cup		Continental		Total	
Season	Club	League	Apps	Goals	Apps	Goals	Apps	Goals	Apps	Goals	Apps	Goals
Israel			League		Israel State Cup		Toto Cup		Europe		Total	
2010–11	Maccabi Netanya	Ligat ha'Al	16	7	4	1	0	0	0	0	20	8
2011–12	Maccabi Netanya	Ligat ha'Al	14	1	0	0	3	0	0	0	17	1
2013-14	Maccabi Yavne	Liga Leumit	16	1	1	0	0	0	0	0	17	1
