= Yaron Hochenboim =

Israeli footballer and manager

Yaron Hochenboim ירון הוכנבוים
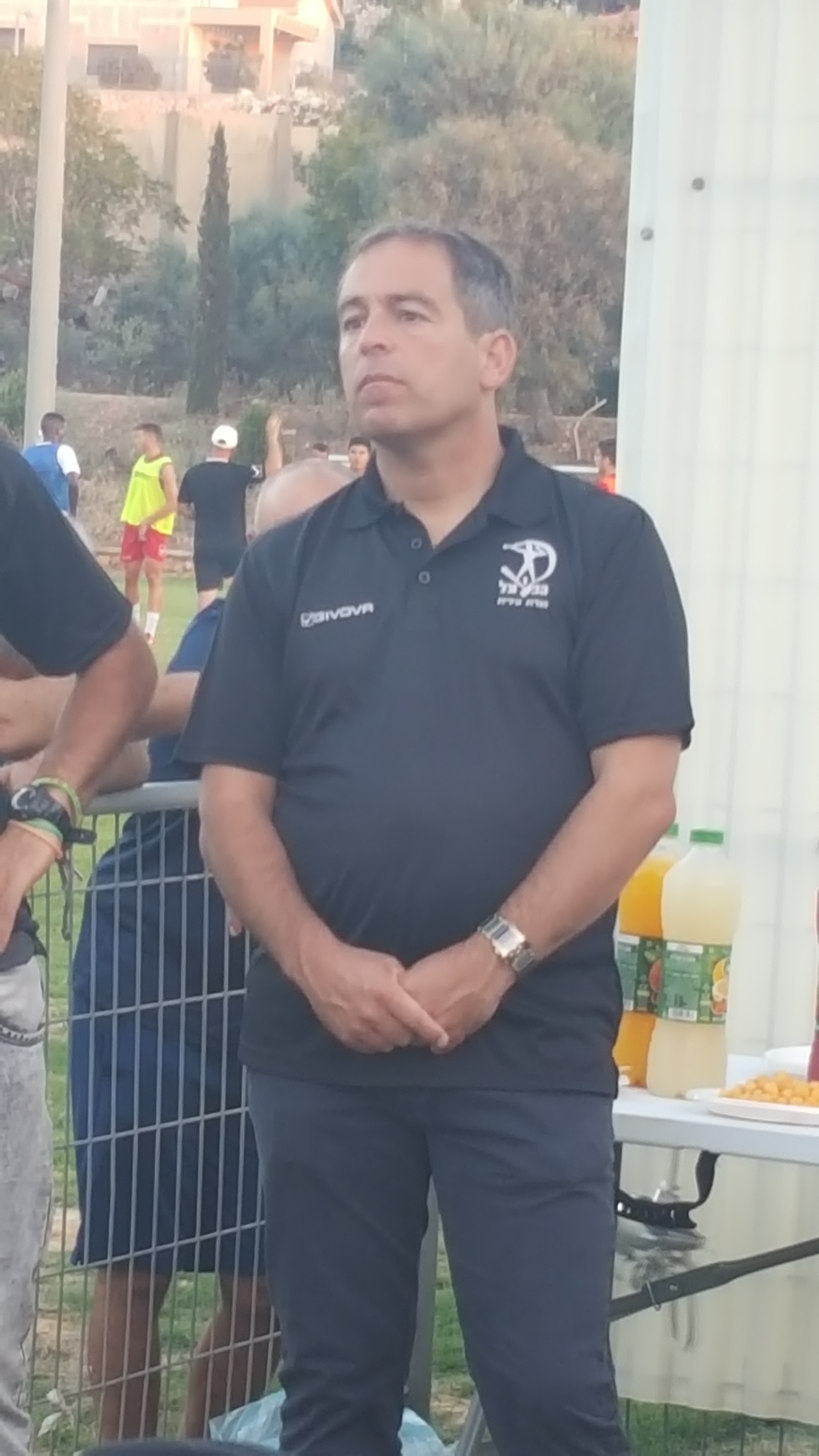

Personal information
- Full name: Yaron Hochenboim
- Date of birth: June 30, 1971 (age 55)
- Place of birth: Haifa, Israel

Team information
- Current team: Hapoel Kfar Shalem (manager)

Senior career*
Years	Team	Apps	(Gls)
- Beitar Haifa
- Beitar Nahariya
–1995	Maccabi Ironi Kafr Qara		

Managerial career
- Hapoel Haifa (youth)
- Hapoel Nahliel
- Hapoel Hadera
- Hapoel Kafr Kanna
- 1999–2003: Hapoel Nazareth Illit
- 2004–2005: Hapoel Beit She'an
- 2005–2006: Hapoel Ramat Gan
- 2006–2007: Hapoel Ashkelon
- 2007: Hapoel Nazareth Illit
- 2007–2010: Hapoel Acre
- 2010–2011: Hapoel Nazareth Illit
- 2011: Hapoel Ramat Gan
- 2011–2015: Hapoel Afula
- 2015–2016: Hapoel Acre
- 2016: Maccabi Sha'arayim
- 2016–2017: Hapoel Petah Tikva
- 2017–2019: Hapoel Nazareth Illit
- 2019–2020: Hapoel Ramat HaSharon
- 2020–2022: Hapoel Nof HaGalil
- 2022: Hapoel Kfar Saba
- 2024: Hapoel Acre
- 2025–: Hapoel Kfar Shalem
- * Club domestic league appearances and goals

Yaron Hochenboim (Hebrew: ירון הוכנבוים) is a former Israeli footballer who now works as the manager of Hapoel Kfar Shalem.

== Honours ==
- Liga Artzit
  - Runner-up (1): 2001-02
- Liga Leumit
  - Runner-up (1): 2008-09
- Liga Alef (North)
  - Winner (1): 2012-13
