= Hapoel Ramat Gan Givatayim F.C. =

Association football club in Israel

Hapoel Ramat Gan Givatayim
- Full name: Hapoel Ramat Gan Givatayim Football Club מועדון כדורגל הפועל רמת גן גבעתיים
- Nickname: Urduns (The Jordanians)
- Founded: 1927; 99 years ago
- Ground: Ramat Gan Stadium, Ramat Gan
- Capacity: 13,370 (permitted seats)
- Owner: Yehuda Doliner
- Manager: Messay Dego
- League: Israeli Premier League
- 2025–26: Liga Leumit, 2nd of 16 (promoted)
Home colours	Away colours

Hapoel Ramat Gan Givatayim F.C. (Hebrew: מועדון כדורגל הפועל רמת-גן גבעתיים, Moadon Kaduregel Hapoel Ramat Gan Givatayim) is an Israeli football club from Ramat Gan and Givatayim. They currently play in the Israeli Premier League, the first tier of Israeli football. Home matches are played at Ramat Gan Stadium, which has a capacity of 13,370. Their regular home strip is all-red.

== History ==
A chart showing the progress of Hapoel Ramat Gan through the Israeli football league system, from 1939 to the present

The club was founded in 1927 during the Mandate era by Jewish settlers in Ramat Gan. After independence, the club were placed in the top division.

After a series of mid-table finishes, they were relegated to the second division in 1959–60 after finishing bottom. In 1962–63, the club were promoted back to the top division, and followed it up by becoming the first team to win the championship in their first season after promotion. The championship-winning match against Hapoel Petah Tikva was watched by the club's record crowd of 9,000. However, this success proved to be their zenith, as they were overtaken by city rivals Hakoah who were champions in the following season, and were relegated at the end of the 1968–69 season.

The early 1980s was a yo-yo era, as the club were promoted and immediately relegated twice in succession from 1979–80 to 1982–83. In 1988–89 they won promotion again, but were again immediately relegated, this being their last period of time in the top flight.

By the end of the 1990s, the club had sunk into Liga Artzit, the third division, though they did pick up some silverware by winning the Toto Cup for third division teams in 1999–2000. In the same season, they were promoted back to the second division.

In 2002–03, Hapoel Ramat Gan became the first team from outside the top division to win the State Cup, when they beat Hapoel Be'er Sheva 5–4 on penalties after a 1–1 draw. The win also meant the club qualified for the UEFA Cup.

Hapoel were drawn against Levski Sofia of Bulgaria in the first round. However, because of a UEFA ban on matches in Israel at the time (due to the security situation), the club had to play their home match in Dunajská Streda, Slovakia. The "home" match attracted a crowd of just 300, and Hapoel lost the tie 5–0 on aggregate (1–0, 4–0).

The following season, the costs of playing in Europe and the loss of many of the best players saw the club finish bottom of the table, resulting in relegation back to the third level. A 9-point deduction for financial issues at the start of the 2005–06 season resulted in another season of struggle, with the club finishing one place above relegation. The following season they won the league, and were promoted back to Liga Leumit.

In 2008–09, the club was promoted to the Israeli Premier League.

At the end of the regular games of 2009/2010 season the team was ranked in 11th place, but after turning half points system offset various management problems is down to 14th place, promising only the remaining league playoff game against Hapoel Kfar Saba 0–1 after it increased. Summer 2010 was characterized by economic uncertainty following professional financial obligations. On June 30, the owner Yaron Koris announced that the team will continue to play after the coverage obligations by its sponsors, and that he leaves the group after four years. Group management was transferred to the management group headed by Shahar Ben Ami gave Datner. In addition, Yuval Naim left after five years as coach and was replaced by Shlomi Dora. On 15 November 2010, Dora was sacked as due to team's league ranking in the last place in the Israeli Premier League for a long time. He was replaced by Zvika Zemach. and now managed by Freddy David, who led the team to win the Toto Cup Leumit trophy in 2011.

Hapoel Ramat Gan finished the regular 2010–11 season at the bottom of the Israeli Premier Division, with just eight points – seventeen points adrift of the penultimately placed Bnei Sakhnin. They had already been deducted four points due to double contracts with players and staff from the previous year. They then finished at the foot of the Bottom Play-Offs mini-table and so were relegated into the Liga Leumit along with Hapoel Ashkelon.

In 2012–13, they were relegated from the Premier League and yet still won their second State Cup as they defeated Hapoel Ironi Kiryat Shmona 4–2 on penalties after a 1–1 draw.

In 2025-2026, the club won promotion from the Liga Leumit, The second tier of Israeli football, by placing 2nd behind Maccabi Petah Tikva.

== Current squad ==
As of 25 August 2026

No.	Pos.	Nation	Player
2	DF	ISR	Yabelo Getachew (on loan from Maccabi Haifa)
3	DF	ISR	Daniel Tishler (on loan from Maccabi Tel Aviv)
4	DF	ISR	Márcio Silva
5	DF	POR	Jota
6	DF	ISR	Moshe Meir
7	MF	ISR	Maxim Plakuschenko
8	MF	ISR	Idan Baranes (on loan from Hapoel Tel Aviv)
9	FW	CMR	Marius Noubissi
10	MF	ISR	Moshe Semel (on loan from (Hungary) Puskás Akadémia)
11	FW	ISR	David Asanka
14	FW	ISR	Hod Messika
15	DF	ISR	Noam Schwartz (on loan from Maccabi Tel Aviv)
16	MF	ISR	Amit Tzur
17	DF	ISR	Omer Itzhak
18	MF	ISR	Oli Cohen Bergman

No.	Pos.	Nation	Player
20	MF	NGR	Christopher Boniface
21	MF	ISR	Ido Oli (on loan from Maccabi Tel Aviv)
22	GK	ISR	Ben Parduaro
24	MF	ISR	Tamir Glazer
27	MF	ISR	Ofek Ovadia
28	MF	ISR	Matan Hozez
33	DF	GHA	Fard Ibrahim
36	DF	ISR	Dudu Twito
37	DF	ISR	Ido Mizrahi
55	GK	ISR	Amit Reif
66	MF	SRB	Srđan Mijailović
77	FW	ISR	Liam Aluk
98	GK	ISR	Tomer Haran
99	FW	BRA	Luan Campos

== European record ==
Season	Competition	Round	Opponents	1st Leg	2nd Leg	Aggregate
2003–04	UEFA Cup	First round	(Bulgaria) Levski Sofia	0–1	0–4	0–5
2013–14	UEFA Europa League	Third qualifying round	(Portugal) Estoril	0–0	0–1	0–1

== Honours ==
=== League ===
Honour	No.	Years
Championships	1	1963–64
Second tier	3	1962–63, 1988–89, 2011–12
Third tier	3	1993–94, 1999–2000, 2006–07

=== Cups ===
Honour	No.	Years
State Cup	2	2002–03, 2012–13
Toto Cup (second division)	1	2011–12
Toto Cup (third division)	3	1999–2000, 2005–06, 2006–07

== Records ==
- Attendance: 9,000 vs Hapoel Petah Tikva (28 March 1964)
- Win: 10–0 vs Beitar Netanya (18 May 1940)
- Goalscorer: Reuven Cohen, 85 goals (1955–68)

== Managers ==
- (Mandatory Palestine) Moshe Poliakov (1935)
- (Mandatory Palestine) Haim Reich (1939)
- (Mandatory Palestine) Isidor Singer (1939–45)
- (Mandatory Palestine) Haim Reich (1946)
- (Mandatory Palestine) (Israel) Shlomo Poliakov (1947–50)
- (Israel) Emmanuel Galili (1951)
- (Israel) Zvi Erlich (1951–53)
- (Israel) Emmanuel Galili (1953)
- (Israel) (Uruguay) Jack Schtakovnik (1953–54)
- (Israel) Emmanuel Galili (1954–55)
- (Israel) Monia Goshen (1955)
- (Israel) Haim Reich (1955–56)
- (Israel) Moshe Varon (1956–59)
- (Israel) Herzl Fritzner (1959–61)
- (Israel) Moshe Varon (1961–62)
- (Israel) David Schweitzer (1962–65)
- (Israel) Moshe Litvak (1965–66)
- (Israel) David Schweitzer (1966–68)
- (Israel) Yechiel Mor (1968–69)
- (Israel) Reuven Cohen (1969–70)
- (Israel) Avraham Bendori (1970–71)
- (Israel) David Farkash (1971–72)
- (Israel) Amnon Raz (1972–73)
- (Israel) Nissim Bachar (1973–75)
- (Israel) Benny Conforti (1975)
- (Israel) Uri Weinberg (1975–76)
- (Israel) Shimon Ben Yehonatan (1976–77)
- (Israel) Hanoch Mordechovich (1977–78)
- (Israel) Shmuel Baruch (1978–79)
- (Israel) Leon Konstantinovski (1979–81)
- (Israel) Eliezer Spiegel (1981–82)
- (Israel) Shimon Ben Yehonatan (1982–83)
- (Israel) Nissim Bachar (1983–84)
- (Israel) Itzhak Vissoker (1984–85)
- (Israel) Amir Kopler (1985–86)
- (Israel) Shimon Ben Yehonatan (1986)
- (Israel) Ronny Levy (1986)
- (Israel) Michael Kadosh (1986–87)
- (Israel) Moshe Meiri (1987–88)
- (Israel) Leon Konstantinovski (1988–89)
- (Israel) Dror Kashtan (1989–90)
- (Israel) David Schweitzer (1990–91)
- (Israel) Moshe Meiri (1991–92)
- (Israel) Dror Bar Nur (1992–93)
- (Israel) Aharon Kapitolnik (1993)
- (Israel) Avi Buchsenbaum (1993–95)
- (Israel) Reuven Cohen (1995–96)
- (Israel) Asher Messing (1996–97)
- (Israel) David Karako (1997–98)
- (Israel) Janos Pas and (Israel) Ilan Harpaz (1998)
- (Israel) Eli Cohen (1998–2001)
- (Israel) Motti Ivanir (2001–02)
- (Israel) Eli Cohen (2002–04)
- (Israel) Yaron Hochenboim (2004)
- (Israel) Itzik Baruch (2004)
- (Israel) Itzik Ovadia (2004–05)
- (Israel) Rafi Buskila (2005)
- (Israel) Nissim Cohen (2005)
- (Israel) Yuval Naim (2005–10)
- (Israel) Shlomi Dora (2010)
- (Israel) Tzvika Tzemah (2010–11)
- (Israel) Itzik Baruch (2011)
- (Israel) Yaron Hochenboim (2011)
- (Israel) Freddy David (2011–12)
- (Israel) Eli Cohen (2012–13)
- (Israel) Arik Gilrovich (2013)
- (Israel) Guy Levy (2013–14)
- (Israel) Tamir Ben Ami (2014)
- (Israel) Dani Golan (2014–16)
- (Israel) (Argentina) Patricio Sayegh (2016)
- (Israel) Lior Zada (2016–17)
- (Israel) Arik Benado (2017)
- (Israel) Itzik Baruch (2017–2018)
- (Israel) Dani Golan (2018)
- (Israel) Nir Berkovic (2018–2019)
