= Doha Stadium =

Football stadium in Sakhnin, Israel

Coordinates: 32°52′00.09″N 35°18′39.06″E

Doha Stadium אצטדיון דוחא
- Peace Stadium
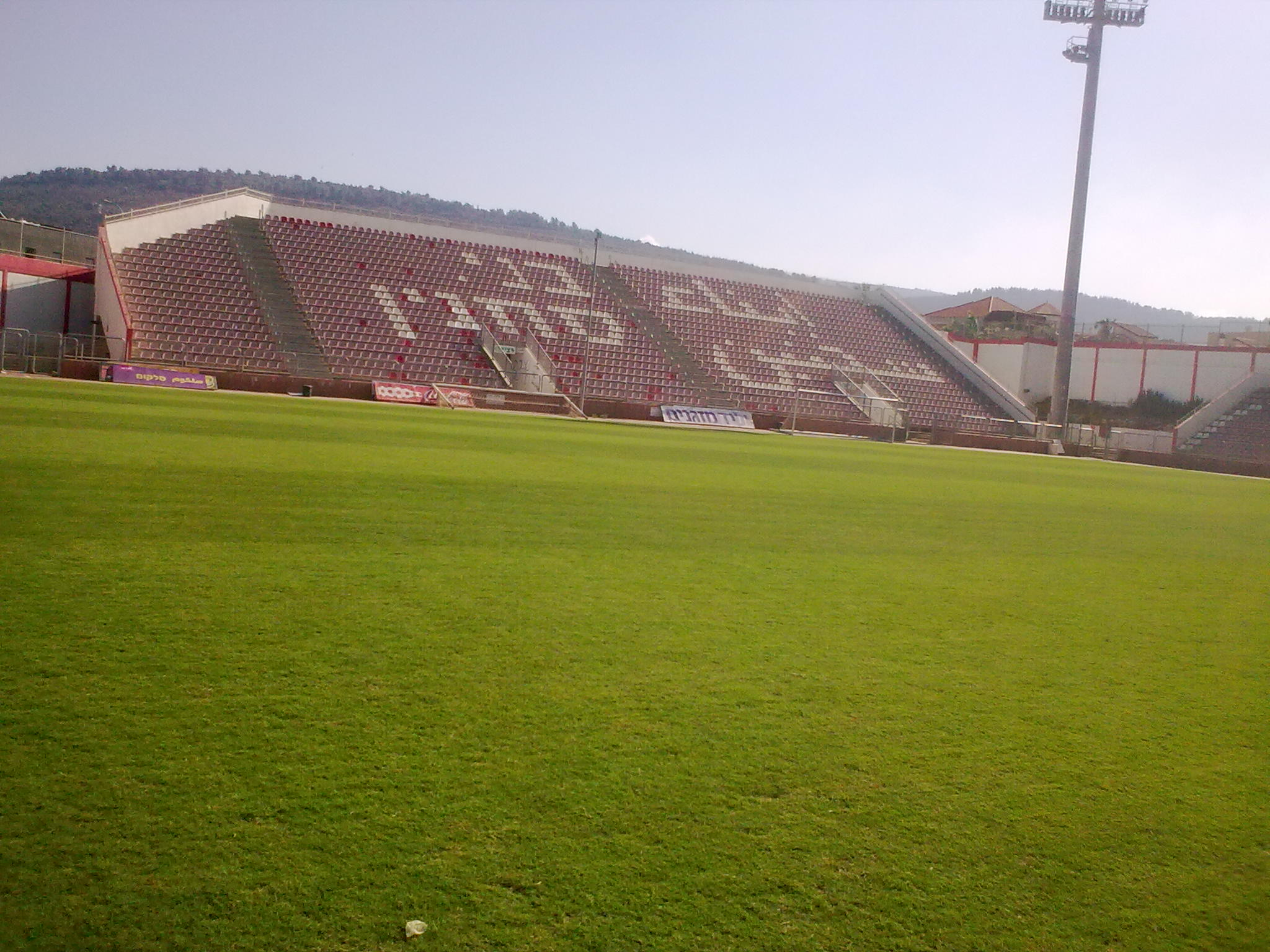
- Interactive map of Doha Stadium אצטדיון דוחא
- Location: Sakhnin, Israel
- Owner: Town of Sakhnin
- Operator: Town of Sakhnin
- Capacity: 7,401
- Surface: Grass

Construction
- Groundbreaking: 2004
- Opened: 2006
- Cost: US $15,000,000

Tenants
- Bnei Sakhnin (2006-present); Ahva Arraba; Bnot Sakhnin

Doha Stadium (Hebrew: אצטדיון דוחא, Etztadion Doḥa; Arabic: ستاد دوحة) is the current home of Bnei Sakhnin.

== History ==
Located in the Israeli city of Sakhnin, Doha Stadium was built with public funds largely from the State of Israel and the Qatar National Olympic Committee, and was named after the Qatari capital, Doha. The decision by the Qataris to build the stadium in Israel came after a meeting between the Knesset member Ahmad Tibi and Secretary-General of the Qatar National Olympic Committee Sheikh Saud Abdulrahman Al Thani after Tibi expressed his concern on the conditions for sport in Sakhnin. The involvement of Qatar was to show that relations between the two nations are peaceful and with a similar interest.

In July 2009, the north stand was opened with an additional 3,500 seats. There are plans to expand the stadium's capacity to 15,000.

In August 2024, Doha has undergone Renovations, and the owners, Bnei Sakhnin had to move to Acre Municipal Stadium Until renovations were finished

In March 2025, the Doha Renovations were finished, and on the 29th of March, 2025, Bnei Sakhnin won 2-1 against Ironi Tiberias in a return match to Doha Stadium

== See also ==
- Sports in Israel
