= Hapoel Acre F.C. =

Association football club in Israel

Hapoel Acre
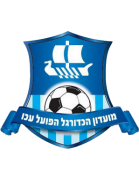
- Full name: Hapoel Acre Football Club מועדון כדורגל הפועל עכו
- Founded: 1946; 80 years ago
- Ground: Acre Municipal Stadium, Acre, Israel
- Capacity: 5,000
- Owner: Dan Lobalski
- Chairman: Haim Parboznik
- Manager: Adham Hadiya
- League: Liga Leumit
- 2025–26: Liga Leumit, 14th of 16
Home colours	Away colours

Hapoel Acre Football Club (Hebrew: מועדון כדורגל הפועל עכו, Moadon Kaduregel Hapoel Akko) is an Israeli professional football club based in Acre. Incorporated in 1946 the club competes in Liga Leumit.

== History ==
A chart showing the progress of Hapoel Acre through the Israeli football league system, from 1949–50 to the present

Founded in 1946, the club dwelt in the lower leagues until they won Liga Bet North A in the 1962–63 season and promoted for the first time to Liga Alef, the second division by then. In 1973–74, they won Liga Alef North division. However, the Israel Football Association decided that season on promotion play-off, involving the top 2 clubs in each Liga Alef division, and the bottom two clubs in Liga Leumit. after finishing in 5th position (out of 6), they were not promoted.

After second-place finish in the 1974–75 season, Hapoel won Liga Alef North division in the 1975–76 and were promoted to the top division for the first time. After finishing 11th (out of 16) in their first season, they won only two matches the next season, and were relegated to Liga Artzit, which was the new second division at the time. This proved to be their last appearance in the top division for the next 31 years.

In 1982–83 the club had dropped into Liga Alef, the third tier at the time. They promoted back to Liga Artzit at the end of the 1984–85 season, after winning the Promotion play-offs against Lazarus Holon, and remained there seasons at the second tier, until the 1987–88 season, where they finished bottom, and relegated to Liga Alef for the second time.

In 1998–99 they were promoted to Liga Artzit (the new third tier, due to the creation of the Israeli Premier League that summer). However, in 2003–04, the club finished as runners-up, and were promoted back to Liga Leumit. In 2005–06, the club won their first ever piece of silverware, picking up the second division's Toto Cup after beating Hapoel Be'er Sheva 5–3 on penalties after a 0–0 draw. In 2008–09, the club finished as runners-up, and promoted to the Premier League.

In the 2010–11 season, the club achieved its best placing to date, when they finished eighth in the Israeli Premier League.

On 3 June 2013, an agreement was signed between Hapoel Acre association and the municipality of Acre, and as a result, a new association was appointed by the municipality.

In the 2012–13 and 2014–15 seasons, the club finished at the bottom of the league at the end of the regular season. However, they avoided relegation in both occasions, following a strong finish of the bottom play-offs. In the 2015–16 season, the club finished second bottom and relegated to Liga Leumit, after seven successive seasons in the top division.

== Stadium ==
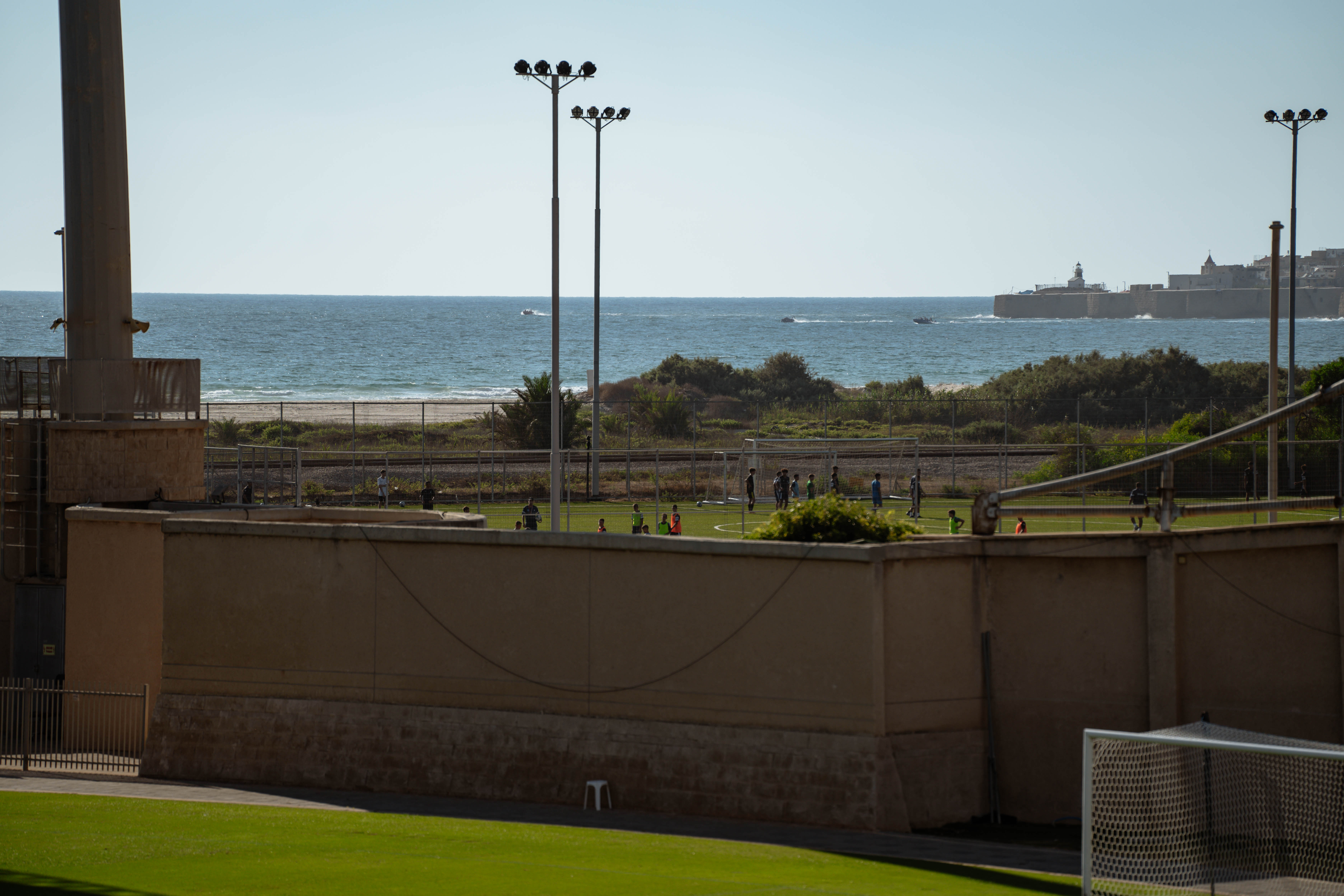
The youth academy's home ground of Hapoel Akko

The club's traditional ground was the 5,000-seat Napoleon Stadium in Acre. Whilst the ground was being refurbished, the club played in Nazareth Illit at Green Stadium shared with Hapoel Nazareth Illit in the 2009–10 and the 2010–11 seasons. In the 2011–12 season the club played in the first month at Ilut Stadium in Ilut, located near Nazareth in northern Israel, before moving to their new Acre Municipal Stadium.

== Current squad ==
As of 5 August 2026

No.	Pos.	Nation	Player
1	GK	ISR	Ron Apepeld
2	DF	ISR	Yoni Elmalem
4	DF	ISR	Ilay Ivgi
5	DF	ISR	Reef Amsalem
6	DF	ISR	Amit Ben Yosef
7	FW	ISR	Sapir Razon
9	FW	ISR	Shalom Obanish
10	MF	ISR	Mido Badarna
11	FW	ISR	Mohamed Khatib
13	MF	ISR	Michael Merenstein

No.	Pos.	Nation	Player
14	MF	ISR	Liam Vermachter
15	DF	ISR	Liad Levi
16	GK	ISR	Omri Zuarets
17	DF	ISR	Salah Hussein
19	FW	DOM	Carlos Sarante
21	MF	ISR	Ryan Mreh
23	MF	ISR	Gaby Joury
26	DF	ISR	Mor Naaman
70	FW	ISR	Ryan Ashmuz
77	DF	ISR	Tomi Tsutsashvili

== Managers ==
- (Israel) Momi Zafran (2006)
- (Israel) Yaron Hochenboim (2007 – May 27, 2010)
- (Israel) Eli Cohen (July 1, 2010 – May 13, 2012)
- (Israel) Shimon Hadari (July 1, 2012 – Jan 1, 2013)
- (Israel) Yuval Naim (Jan 27, 2013 – Jan 27, 2014)
- (Israel) Alon Harazi (Jan 27, 2014 – Jan 5, 2015)
- (Israel) Shlomi Dora (Jan 8, 2015 – May 2015)
- (Israel) Yaron Hochenboim (June 28, 2015 – May 2016)
- (Israel) Momi Zafran (2016)
- (Israel) Shlomi Dora (May 31, 2016 – October 23, 2017)
- (Israel) Eldad Shavit (October 25, 2017 – January 16, 2018)
- (Israel) Alon Ziv (17 January 2018 – March 10, 2018)
- (Israel) Haim Levy (March 11, 2019 – June 10, 2019)
- (Israel) Eli Cohen (June 10, 2019 – present)
