= Acre Municipal Stadium =

Football stadium in Acre

Coordinates: 32°54′28.43″N 35°5′9.84″E

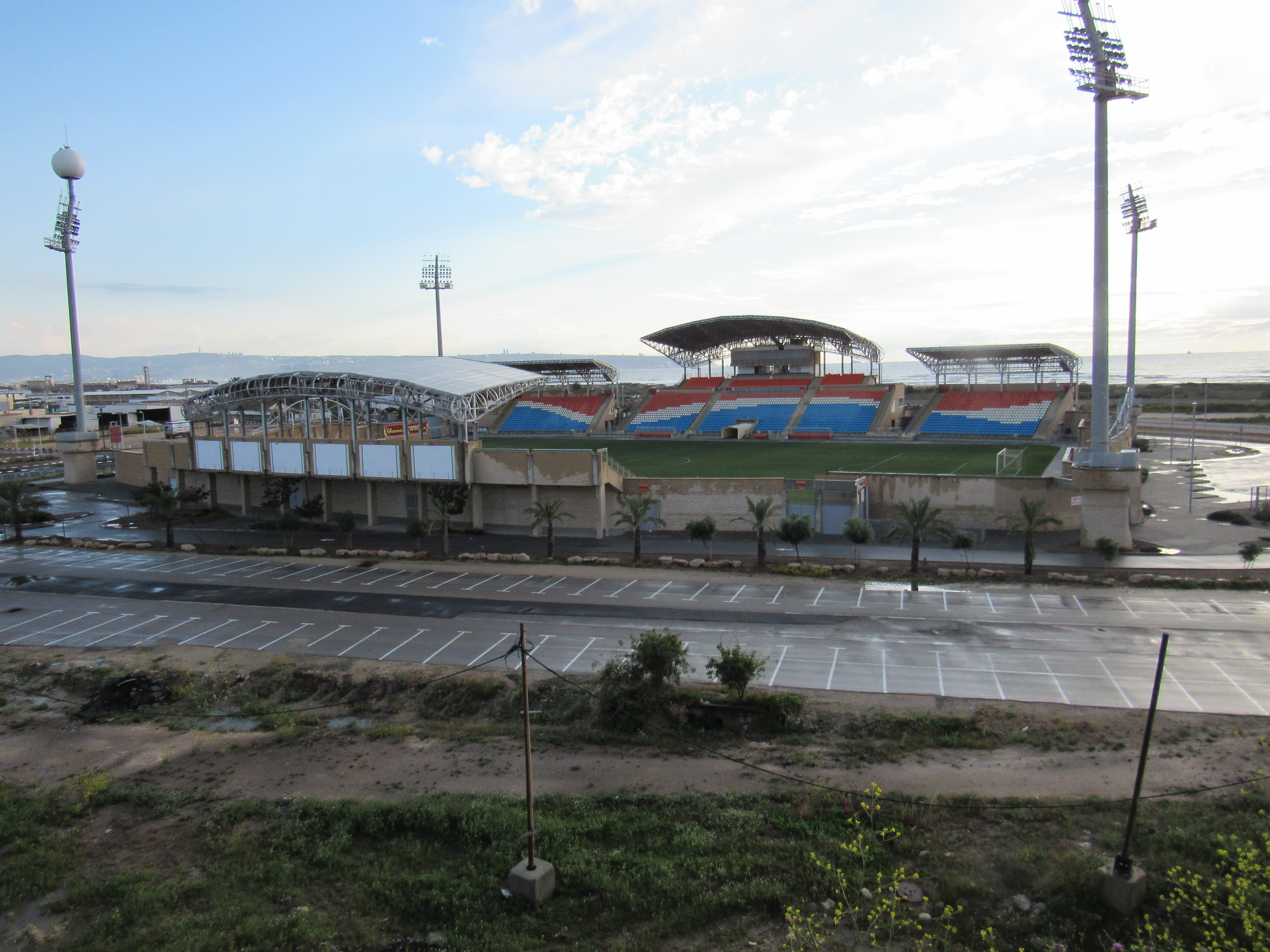
- Interactive map of Acre Municipal Stadium
- Location: Acre, Israel
- Owner: Municipality of Acre
- Operator: Municipality of Acre
- Capacity: 5,000

Construction
- Groundbreaking: 26 May 2009
- Opened: 4 September 2011
- Cost: ₪ 50 million

Tenants
- Hapoel Acre (2011–present), Ahi Acre F.C., Maccabi Ironi Acre F.C. Haifa Robi Shapira (2016-present)

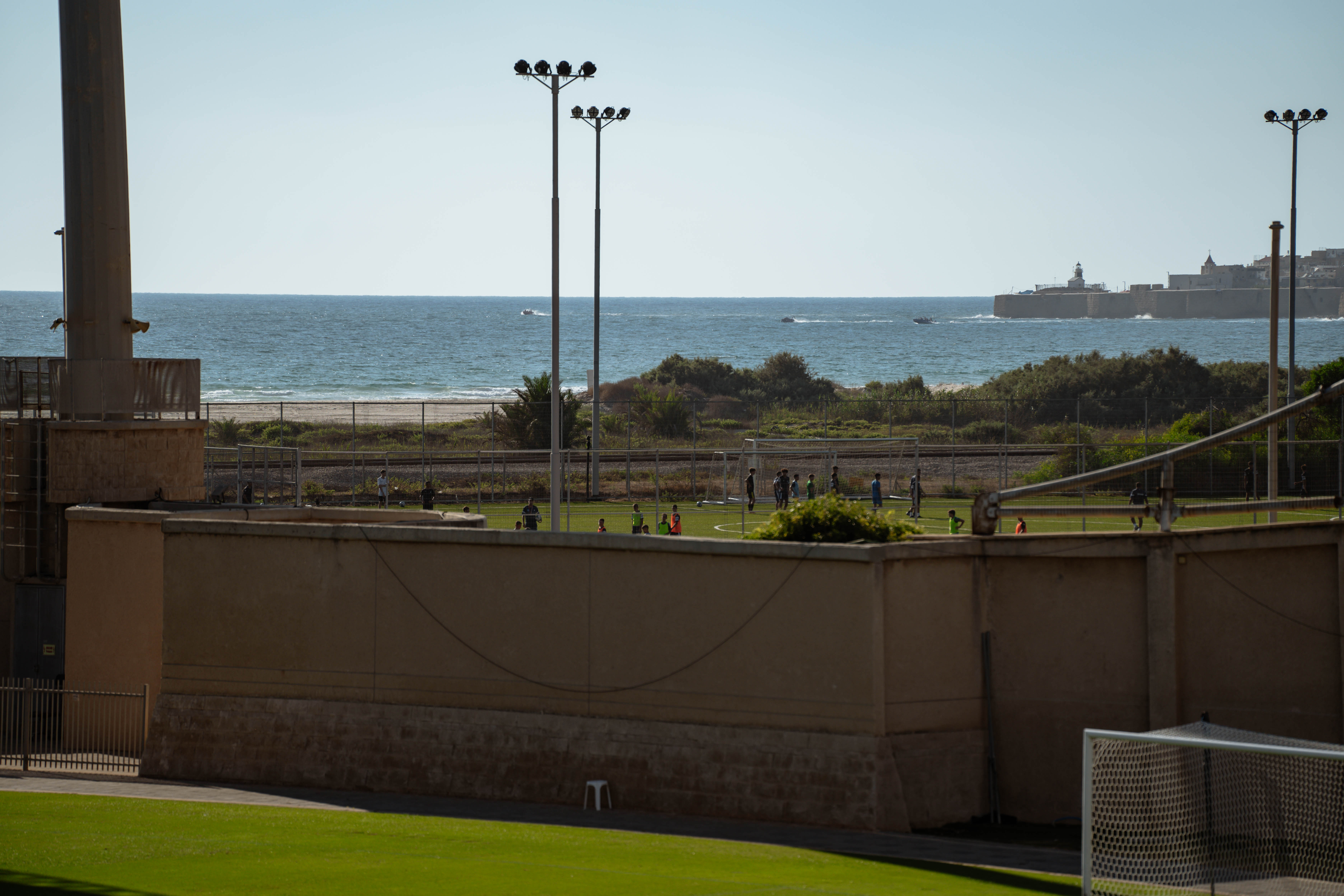
The youth academy's home ground of Hapoel Akko

Acre Municipal Stadium (Hebrew: האצטדיון העירוני של עכו, Haitztadion Haironi Shel Akko), also Toto Acre Stadium (Hebrew: אצטדיון טוטו עכו, Itztadion Toto Akko), is a soccer stadium in Acre, Israel. It is the home ground of Hapoel Acre which plays in Liga Leumit, the second tier of the Israeli football league system. The stadium is located at the southern entrance of town, near the Ein HaMifratz intersection.

== History ==
The stadium has 5,000 seats in two covered balconies, four dressing rooms, service rooms, and over 1,000 square metres of commercial space. The establishment of the stadium at a cost of 50 million NIS was made possible after a collaboration between the Municipality of Acre, Toto Winner Organization, Israel Railways, Ministry of Transport and Road Safety, and the National Infrastructure Minister of Israel.

For many years, the home stadium of Hapoel Acre was the Napoleon Stadium. In the early 2000s, the western tier of the stadium was demolished in favor of an Israel Railways project. After the demolition of the stadium bleachers, the stadium was disqualified for league games and since then it became the team's training field. The new stadium, which some of his founds came from Israel Railways as a compensation for demolished the old stadium. until the stadium completion Hapoel Acre had to play its home games in other cities.

The stadium was inaugurated on 4 September 2011, after two and a half years of construction, in a friendly match between Hapoel Acre and Maccabi Haifa, the game ended in a 2–0 win for Maccabi Haifa. Before the game, it had an opening ceremony with Shimon Lankri, the mayor of Acre, and Avi Luzon, the chairman of the Israel Football Association.

The stadium's first official game came on 12 September 2011, between Hapoel Acre and Hapoel Be'er Sheva in the Israeli Premier League. the game ended in a 2–0 win for Hapoel Acre.

== See also ==
- Sports in Israel
