= Eli Cohen (footballer, born 1961) =

Israeli footballer and manager

Eli Cohen אלי כהן
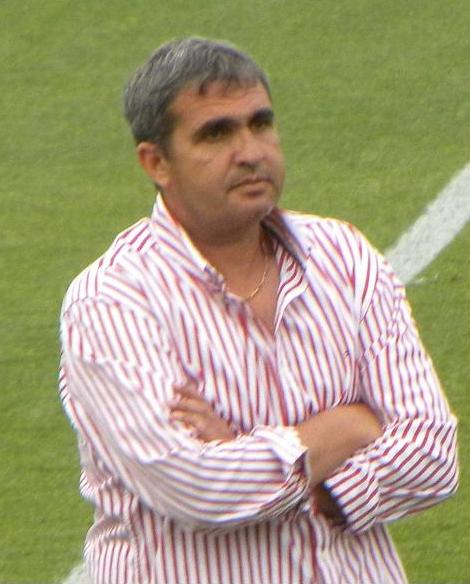

Personal information
- Full name: Eli Cohen
- Date of birth: 6 April 1961 (age 65)
- Place of birth: Haifa, Israel
- Height: 1.83 m (6 ft 0 in)
- Position: Defender

Team information
- Current team: Shimshon Tel Aviv

Youth career
- 1973–1979: Maccabi Haifa

Senior career*
| Years | Team | Apps | (Gls) |
| 1979–1987 | Maccabi Haifa | 193 | (9) |
| 1986–1987 | → Hapoel Tzafririm Holon (loan) | | |
| 1987–1995 | Hapoel Tzafririm Holon | | |

Managerial career
- 1998–2001: Hapoel Ramat Gan
- 2001–2002: Maccabi Herzliya
- 2002–2004: Hapoel Ramat Gan
- 2004–2006: Hapoel Tzafririm Holon
- 2006–2010: Hapoel Ra'anana
- 2010–2012: Hapoel Acre
- 2012–2013: Hapoel Ramat Gan
- 2013: Beitar Jerusalem
- 2014–2015: Bnei Sakhnin
- 2016: Hapoel Haifa
- 2017: Hapoel Kfar Saba
- 2018–2019: Hapoel Ramt HaSharon
- 2019–2021: Hapoel Acre
- 2022–2023: Hapoel Ra'anana
- 2023: Maccabi Ironi Ashdod
- 2024: Maccabi Yavne
- 2024–: Shimshon Tel Aviv
- * Club domestic league appearances and goals

Eli Cohen (Hebrew: אלי כהן; born 6 April 1961) is an Israeli football manager and former player.

== Career ==
=== Playing career ===
During the 1980s (While playing at Maccabi Haifa), Cohen had won two championships.

=== Management career ===
In 2003 Cohen won the Israel State Cup as manager of Hapoel Ramat Gan.

At the beginning of 2004, Cohen was sacked from Hapoel Ramat Gan following a dispute with the team chairman. Cohen moved to coach Hapoel Tzafririm Holon, for which he played in the past. During his time, the team went down to Liga Alef, but eventually stayed in Liga Leumit due to Maccabi Kiryat Gat heavy debts. In 2005 Holon was relegated back to Liga Alef.

At the beginning of 2006, Cohen was called to manage Hapoel Ra'anana, which was in last place in Liga Leumit. At the end of the season he managed to remain in the league, and in 2009, Cohen was able to promote the team to the Israeli Premier League for the team first time. In March 2010, Cohen was sacked from Hapoel Ra'anana after four years at the club, after the team struggled in the relegation places.

During the Summer of 2010, he was signed in Hapoel Acre, and helped the team to avoid relegation.

== Honours ==
=== As a player ===
- Israeli Premier League (2):
  - 1983–84, 1984–85
- Second Division (2):
  - 1986–87, 1989–90

=== As a manager ===
- Toto Cup (Artzit) (1):
  - 1999–2000
- Israel State Cup (2):
  - 2003, 2013
