= Shlomi Dora =

Israeli football manager

Shlomi Dora שלומי דורה
Personal information
- Full name: Shlomi Dora שלומי דורה
- Date of birth: June 22, 1973 (age 53)
- Place of birth: Haifa, Israel

Team information
- Current team: Hapoel Umm al-Fahm

Youth career
- Years: Team
- Hapoel Haifa

Managerial career
- 2004–2005: Hapoel Haifa (U19)
- 2007–2010: Hapoel Haifa
- 2010: Hapoel Ramat Gan
- 2011–2013: Bnei Sakhnin
- 2013–2014: Hapoel Haifa
- 2014: Maccabi Ahi Nazareth
- 2015: Hapoel Acre
- 2015: Maccabi Netanya
- 2016: Hapoel Ironi Kiryat Shmona
- 2016–2017: Hapoel Acre
- 2018: Maccabi Ahi Nazareth
- 2018–2019: Hapoel Ashkelon
- 2019–2020: Hapoel Afula
- 2021: F.C. Kafr Qasim
- 2022: Hapoel Umm al-Fahm
- 2022–2023: Sektzia Ness Ziona
- 2024–: Ihud Bnei Shefa-'Amr

Shlomi Dora (Hebrew: שלומי דורה; born June 22, 1973, in Haifa) is an Israeli football manager.

His younger brother is the footballer Yossi Dora who played for Hapoel Haifa.

== Honours ==
=== As manager ===
- Liga Leumit (1):
  - 2008–09
