= 2020–21 Israeli Premier League =

Israeli Premier League
- Season: 2020–21
- Dates: 22 August 2020 – 30 May 2021
- Champions: Maccabi Haifa
- Relegated: Bnei Yehuda; Hapoel Kfar Saba
- Champions League: Maccabi Haifa
- Europa Conference League: Maccabi Tel Aviv; F.C. Ashdod; Hapoel Be'er Sheva
- Matches: 240
- Goals: 561 (2.34 per match)
- Top goalscorer: Nikita Rukavytsya (19 goals)
- Biggest home win: Maccabi Netanya 7–0 Bnei Sakhnin (14 September 2020)
- Biggest away win: Hapoel Tel Aviv 0–4 Maccabi Tel Aviv (28 December 2020); Hapoel Hadera 0–4 Beitar Jerusalem (6 January 2021)
- Highest scoring: Maccabi Netanya 7–0 Bnei Sakhnin (14 September 2020); Maccabi Tel Aviv 4–3 Hapoel Haifa (13 December 2020)
- Longest winning run: 10 — Maccabi Tel Aviv
- Longest unbeaten run: 22 — Maccabi Tel Aviv
- Longest winless run: 13 — Hapoel Kfar Saba
- Longest losing run: 6 — Hapoel Kfar Saba

The 2020–21 Israeli Premier League, also known as Ligat Tel Aviv Stock Exchange for sponsorship reasons, was the 22nd season since its introduction in 1999 and the 79th season of top-tier football in Israel. The season began on 22 August 2020 and concluded on 30 May 2021.

== Teams ==
A total of fourteen teams were competing in the league, including twelve sides from the 2019–20 season and two promoted teams from the 2019–20 Liga Leumit.

Maccabi Petah Tikva were promoted as the winners of the 2019–20 Liga Leumit. Bnei Sakhnin were promoted as the Runner-ups of the 2019–20 Liga Leumit. The two teams returned just one year after their relegation.

Hapoel Ra'anana and Sektzia Nes Tziona were relegated to the 2020–21 Liga Leumit after finishing the 2019–20 Israeli Premier League in the bottom two places.

=== Stadiums and locations ===
Locations of the 2020–21 Israeli Premier League teams

Team	Location	Stadium	Capacity
Beitar Jerusalem	Jerusalem	Teddy Stadium	31,733
Bnei Sakhnin	Sakhnin	Doha Stadium	8,500
Bnei Yehuda	Tel Aviv	Bloomfield Stadium	29,400
F.C. Ashdod	Ashdod	Yud-Alef Stadium	7,800
Hapoel Be'er Sheva	Be'er Sheva	Turner Stadium	16,126
Hapoel Hadera	Hadera	Netanya Stadium	13,610
Hapoel Haifa	Haifa	Sammy Ofer Stadium	30,950
Hapoel Kfar Saba	Kfar Saba	HaMoshava Stadium	11,500
Hapoel Tel Aviv	Tel Aviv	Bloomfield Stadium	29,400
Ironi Kiryat Shmona	Kiryat Shmona	Kiryat Shmona Stadium	5,300
Maccabi Haifa	Haifa	Sammy Ofer Stadium	30,950
Maccabi Netanya	Netanya	Netanya Stadium	13,610
Maccabi Petah Tikva	Petah Tikva	HaMoshava Stadium	11,500
Maccabi Tel Aviv	Tel Aviv	Bloomfield Stadium	29,400

Beitar Jerusalem	Bnei Yehuda Tel Aviv Hapoel Tel Aviv Maccabi Tel Aviv	Ironi Kiryat Shmona
Teddy Stadium	Bloomfield Stadium	Kiryat Shmona Stadium
Maccabi Netanya Hapoel Hadera	Hapoel Haifa Maccabi Haifa	Maccabi Petah Tikva Hapoel Kfar Saba
Netanya Stadium	Sammy Ofer Stadium	HaMoshava Stadium
F.C. Ashdod	Bnei Sakhnin	Hapoel Be'er Sheva
Yud-Alef Stadium	Doha Stadium	Turner Stadium

=== Personnel and sponsorship ===
Team	President	Manager	Captain	Kitmaker	Shirt sponsor
Beitar Jerusalem	(Israel) Moshe Hogeg	(Israel) Slobodan Drapić (Israel) Shai Berda	(Israel) Idan Vered	Umbro	Geshem Holdings
Bnei Sakhnin	(Israel) Fawzi Hameed	(Israel) Sharon Mimer	(Israel) Ali Ottman	Givova	——
Bnei Yehuda	(Israel) Barak Abramov	(Israel) Yossi Abukasis	(Israel) Dan Mori	Lotto	——
F.C. Ashdod	F.C. Ashdod Supporters trust	(Israel) Ran Ben Shimon	(Israel) Tom Ben Zaken	Nike	Cooko
Hapoel Be'er Sheva	(Israel) Alona Barkat	(Israel) Ronny Levy	(Israel) Loai Taha	Kelme	Machsaney HaShuk
Hapoel Hadera	(Israel) Oren Golan	(Israel) Meni Koretski	(Israel) Menashe Zalka	Lotto	Printer Center
Hapoel Haifa	(Israel) Yoav Katz	(Israel) Haim Silvas	(Israel) Dor Malul	Diadora	Moked Hat'ama
Hapoel Kfar Saba	(Israel) Itzhak Shum	(Israel) Elisha Levy	(Israel) Omer Fadida	Macron	Advice
Hapoel Tel Aviv	Nisanov Group	(Israel) Nir Klinger	(Israel) Omri Altman	Macron	Hcsra Insurance
Ironi Kiryat Shmona	(Israel) Izzy Sheratzky	(Israel) Kobi Refua	(Israel) Idan Nachmias	Kelme	Ituran
Maccabi Haifa	(Israel) Ya'akov Shahar	(Israel) Barak Bakhar	(Israel) Neta Lavi	Nike	Volvo
Maccabi Netanya	(Israel) Eyal Segal	(Netherlands) Raymond Atteveld	(Israel) Almog Cohen	Lotto	Panorama North
Maccabi Petah Tikva	(Israel) Avraham Luzon	(Israel) Guy Luzon	(Israel) Arik Yanko	Macron	Jucky
Maccabi Tel Aviv	(Canada) Mitchell Goldhar	(Netherlands) Patrick van Leeuwen	(Israel) Sheran Yeini	Fila	PenguinPickUp

=== Foreign players ===
The number of foreign players were restricted to six per team, while only five could have been registered to a game.

Club	Player 1	Player 2	Player 3	Player 4	Player 5	Player 6	Non-visa player
Beitar Jerusalem	(Brazil) Matheusinho	(Montenegro) **Marko Janković**	(Niger) **Ali Mohamed**	(Paraguay) Santiago Ocampos	(Suriname) **Gleofilo Vlijter**	(France) Antoine Conte	(Argentina) Nico Olsak (Note: Born and started their professional career abroad but are eligible for Israeli citizenship due to Jewish ancestry.)
Bnei Sakhnin	(Austria) Lukas Spendlhofer	(Colombia) Sebastián Velásquez	(Jamaica) **Dane Kelly**	(Nigeria) **Ikouwem Udo**	(Suriname) **Nigel Hasselbaink**		
Bnei Yehuda	(Brazil) Allyson	(Chile) Pedro Campos	(Montenegro) **Fatos Bećiraj**	(Niger) **Yussif Moussa**	(Serbia) Matija Ljujić	(United States) George Fochive	
F.C. Ashdod	(Ghana) Montari Kamaheni	(Ghana) Abdul Mugees Zakaria	(Mali) Moussa Bagayoko	(Serbia) Nenad Cvetković	(Uganda) **Fahad Bayo**	(Uganda) **Timothy Awany**	
Hapoel Be'er Sheva	(Argentina) Marcelo Meli	(Brazil) Farley Rosa	(Colombia) Jonathan Agudelo	(Netherlands) Elton Acolatse	(Portugal) **Josué Pesqueira**	(Portugal) Miguel Vítor	(Argentina) Mariano Bareiro
Hapoel Haifa	(Bosnia and Herzegovina) **Jasmin Burić**	(Nigeria) William Agada					
Hapoel Kfar Saba	(England) Jamie Hopcutt	(France) Amadou Soukouna	(Kosovo) **Florent Hasani**	(Lithuania) **Domantas Šimkus**	(Nigeria) Sodiq Atanda	(Uganda) **Luwagga Kizito**	
Hapoel Hadera	(Brazil) Gustavo Marmentini	(Ivory Coast) Jonathan Cissé	(Ivory Coast) Sékou Doumbia	(Nigeria) Muhammed Usman Edu	(Nigeria) Odah Marshall		
Hapoel Tel Aviv	(Ghana) Emmanuel Boateng	(Lithuania) **Ernestas Šetkus**	(South Africa) **Siyanda Xulu**				
Ironi Kiryat Shmona	(Brazil) Lúcio Maranhão	(The Gambia) Saikou Touray	(Ghana) **Eugene Ansah**	(Lithuania) **Džiugas Bartkus**	(Nigeria) Mike Amanga		
Maccabi Haifa	(Cameroon) **Ernest Mabouka**	(Spain) José Rodriguez	(Ghana) Godsway Donyoh	(Suriname) **Tjaronn Chery**	(Netherlands) Yanic Wildschut	(Serbia) Bogdan Planić	(Australia) **Nikita Rukavytsya** (Note: Born and started their professional career abroad but have since gained an Israeli passport or permanent residency, allowing them to play with Israeli status.) (United States) Josh Cohen
Maccabi Netanya	(Ivory Coast) Aboubacar Junior Doumbia	(Ivory Coast) Fernand Gouré	(Jamaica) **Kevaughn Frater**	(Netherlands) Kellian van der Kaap	(Serbia) Zlatan Šehović	(Zambia) Lameck Banda	
Maccabi Petah Tikva	(Brazil) Marcus Diniz	(England) Morgan Ferrier	(Ghana) Elvis Sakyi	(Panama) **Armando Cooper**	(Panama) **Abdiel Arroyo**	(Portugal) Jucie Lupeta	
Maccabi Tel Aviv	(Spain) Enric Saborit	(Spain) Luis Hernández	(Panama) **Eduardo Guerrero**	(Portugal) André Geraldes	(Serbia) **Aleksandar Pešić**	(Serbia) Uroš Nikolić	(Barbados) **Nick Blackman** (Brazil) Daniel Tenenbaum

In bold: Players that have been capped for their national team.

=== Managerial changes ===
Team	Outgoing manager	Manner of departure	Date of vacancy	Position in table	Incoming manager	Date of appointment
Maccabi Tel Aviv	(Serbia) Vladimir Ivić	End of contract	6 July 2020	Pre-season	(Greece) Georgios Donis	12 August 2020
Maccabi Haifa	(Israel) Marco Balbul	End of contract	7 July 2020	Pre-season	(Israel) Barak Bakhar	8 July 2020
Maccabi Netanya	(Israel) Slobodan Drapić	Sacked	16 July 2020	Pre-season	(Netherlands) Raymond Atteveld	16 July 2020
Beitar Jerusalem	(Israel) Ronny Levy	Sacked	28 August 2020	Pre-season	(Israel) Slobodan Drapić	4 September 2020
Bnei Yehuda Tel Aviv	(Israel) Elisha Levy	Resigned	7 October 2020	6th	(Israel) Nir Berkovic	12 October 2020
Bnei Sakhnin	(Israel) Eldad Shavit	Resigned	14 October 2020	14th	(Israel) Nisso Avitan	18 October 2020
Bnei Yehuda Tel Aviv	(Israel) Nir Berkovic	Sacked	26 November 2020	5th	(Israel) Kfir Edri (caretaker)	26 November 2020
Hapoel Kfar Saba	(Israel) Amir Turgeman	Sacked	13 December 2020	8th	(Israel) Elisha Levy	28 December 2020
Maccabi Tel Aviv	(Greece) Georgios Donis	Sacked	23 December 2020	5th	(Netherlands) Patrick van Leeuwen	23 December 2020
Hapoel Hadera	(Israel) Sharon Mimer	Sacked	28 January 2021	13th	(Israel) Meni Koretski	29 January 2021
Hapoel Be'er Sheva	(Israel) Yossi Abukasis	Resigned	30 January 2021	5th	(Israel) Ronny Levy	17 February 2021
Bnei Yehuda Tel Aviv	(Israel) Kfir Edri (caretaker)	End of caretakaking spell	1 February 2021	12th	(Israel) Yossi Abukasis	1 February 2021
Bnei Sakhnin	(Israel) Nisso Avitan	Sacked	28 February 2021	14th	(Israel) Sharon Mimer	1 March 2021
Beitar Jerusalem	(Israel) Slobodan Drapić	Resigned	20 March 2021	8th	(Israel) Yossi Mizrahi	21 March 2021
Hapoel Kfar Saba	(Israel) Elisha Levy	Sacked	21 March 2021	13th	(Israel) Ravid Gazal	29 March 2021
Hapoel Haifa	(Israel) Haim Silvas	Sacked	5 April 2021	10th	(Israel) Elisha Levy	5 April 2021

== Regular season ==
=== Regular season table ===
Pos	Team	Pld	W	D	L	GF	GA	GD	Pts	Qualification or relegation
1	Maccabi Haifa	26	19	2	5	52	20	+32	59	Qualification for the Championship round
2	Maccabi Tel Aviv	26	17	7	2	48	21	+27	58	Qualification for the Championship round
3	F.C. Ashdod	26	13	4	9	37	25	+12	43	Qualification for the Championship round
4	Ironi Kiryat Shmona	26	11	5	10	26	28	−2	38	Qualification for the Championship round
5	Hapoel Be'er Sheva	26	9	10	7	31	29	+2	37	Qualification for the Championship round
6	Maccabi Petah Tikva	26	11	4	11	24	23	+1	37	Qualification for the Championship round
7	Maccabi Netanya	26	9	7	10	35	30	+5	34	Transfer to the Relegation round
8	Beitar Jerusalem	26	8	8	10	31	32	−1	32	Transfer to the Relegation round
9	Hapoel Hadera	26	8	8	10	26	28	−2	32	Transfer to the Relegation round
10	Hapoel Haifa	26	7	9	10	30	37	−7	30	Transfer to the Relegation round
11	Bnei Sakhnin	26	8	5	13	15	36	−21	29	Transfer to the Relegation round
12	Hapoel Tel Aviv	26	6	9	11	17	28	−11	27	Transfer to the Relegation round
13	Hapoel Kfar Saba	26	6	5	15	19	33	−14	23	Transfer to the Relegation round
14	Bnei Yehuda	26	5	7	14	15	36	−21	22	Transfer to the Relegation round

Source: Soccerway
Rules for classification: 1) Points; 2) Goal difference; 3) Matches won; 4) Goals scored; 5) Head-to-head points; 6) Head-to-head goal difference; 7) Head-to-head goals scored; 8) Play-off.

=== Regular season results ===
Home \ Away	BEI	BnS	BnY	ASH	HAH	HBS	HHA	HKS	HTA	IKS	MHA	MNE	MPT	MTA
Beitar Jerusalem	—	2–3	1–1	1–2	4–0	1–2	3–3	2–1	0–1	1–0	0–3	1–1	1–2	0–0
Bnei Sakhnin	0–0	—	0–3	1–0	0–2	1–0	0–1	0–1	0–1	0–2	0–3	0–1	1–0	1–2
Bnei Yehuda	1–0	1–1	—	1–0	0–3	0–2	0–2	1–3	1–0	1–0	0–2	1–1	0–1	2–2
F.C. Ashdod	2–0	0–0	4–0	—	1–1	2–0	0–1	2–0	2–1	0–2	1–0	4–0	1–0	3–2
Hapoel Hadera	0–4	4–0	0–0	1–1	—	2–2	3–1	1–1	1–1	0–1	1–2	2–1	1–0	0–1
Hapoel Be'er Sheva	1–1	2–2	2–0	0–3	1–0	—	2–2	0–0	0–1	2–1	1–1	3–2	1–2	0–1
Hapoel Haifa	0–1	0–2	2–1	2–2	0–0	2–2	—	2–1	2–0	0–2	2–1	0–0	1–2	0–2
Hapoel Kfar Saba	1–1	0–1	3–1	0–1	0–1	0–1	0–0	—	2–1	0–1	3–2	0–1	2–0	0–1
Hapoel Tel Aviv	1–1	0–1	0–0	0–2	1–0	0–3	2–2	1–1	—	1–1	1–2	0–0	0–0	0–4
Ironi Kiryat Shmona	0–2	0–1	2–0	2–1	1–1	2–2	1–1	1–0	1–0	—	0–3	1–4	2–1	0–2
Maccabi Haifa	2–0	3–0	3–0	2–1	1–0	3–1	2–0	3–0	1–0	4–2	—	2–0	0–2	2–2
Maccabi Netanya	1–2	7–0	1–0	3–0	0–1	0–1	2–1	3–0	0–1	0–0	0–2	—	3–2	1–3
Maccabi Petah Tikva	0–1	0–0	1–0	2–1	1–0	0–0	2–0	2–0	0–2	0–1	1–2	1–1	—	0–1
Maccabi Tel Aviv	4–1	1–0	0–0	3–1	3–1	0–0	4–3	3–0	1–1	1–0	2–1	2–2	1–2	—

Source: "Ligat Ha'Al – Matches".
Legend: Blue = home team win; Yellow = draw; Red = away team win.

=== Results by round ===
The table lists the results of teams in each round
Team ╲ Round	1	2	3	4	5	6	7	8	9	10	11	12	13	14	15	16	17	18	19	20	21	22	23	24	25	26
Beitar Jerusalem	W	W	W	D	L	L	D	L	L	D	D	D	L	D	W	W	L	W	D	W	L	D	L	L	W	L
Bnei Sakhnin	L	L	L	D	L	L	W	W	W	D	W	L	D	D	L	L	W	L	L	L	D	L	W	L	W	W
Bnei Yehuda	W	D	L	W	L	W	L	W	L	L	D	L	L	D	D	L	L	L	D	W	D	L	D	L	L	L
F.C. Ashdod	L	W	W	L	W	L	W	L	W	W	D	L	W	L	W	L	W	L	W	W	D	L	W	D	D	W
Hapoel Hadera	L	L	D	D	W	L	L	L	D	W	D	W	D	L	L	L	L	W	D	L	W	W	D	D	W	W
Hapoel Be'er Sheva	W	L	D	D	D	D	L	D	W	W	W	L	W	W	D	W	L	L	W	L	D	D	D	L	D	W
Hapoel Haifa	L	D	W	L	W	L	W	D	L	L	W	W	D	D	L	D	L	W	D	L	D	W	L	D	D	L
Hapoel Kfar Saba	W	L	W	L	W	D	L	L	D	L	L	D	L	D	W	W	L	L	L	W	L	L	L	D	L	L
Hapoel Tel Aviv	L	L	L	D	L	W	D	L	D	L	L	W	L	D	L	D	W	D	D	W	D	W	L	W	L	D
Ironi Kiryat Shmona	W	D	L	D	W	W	W	D	L	L	L	L	W	W	W	L	W	D	W	L	L	L	D	W	L	W
Maccabi Haifa	W	W	W	D	L	W	L	W	W	W	W	W	W	W	D	W	L	W	L	W	W	W	W	L	W	W
Maccabi Netanya	L	W	D	W	L	W	D	D	D	W	D	L	L	L	W	L	W	W	D	L	W	L	D	W	L	L
Maccabi Petah Tikva	W	W	L	W	W	L	D	W	W	L	L	W	D	L	L	W	W	L	L	L	L	W	D	W	D	L
Maccabi Tel Aviv	L	D	D	D	D	W	W	W	L	W	D	W	W	W	D	W	W	W	W	W	W	W	W	W	W	D

Source: "Ligat Ha'Al – Matches".
W = Win; D = Draw; L = Loss

=== Positions by round ===
The table lists the positions of teams after each week of matches. To preserve chronological evolvements, any postponed matches are not included in the round at which they were originally scheduled, but added to the full round they were played immediately afterwards. For example, if a match is scheduled for round 13, but then postponed and played between rounds 16 and 17, it will be added to the standings for round 16.

Leader and Qualification for the Championship round
Qualification for the Championship round
Qualification for the Relegation round

Team ╲ Round	1	2	3	4	5	6	7	8	9	10	11	12	13	14	15	16	17	18	19	20	21	22	23	24	25	26
Maccabi Haifa	4	1	1	2	3	1	5	3	1	1	1	1	1	1	1	1	1	1	1	1	1	1	1	2	2	1
Maccabi Tel Aviv	9	10	10	10	10	8	8	6	7	5	5	3	2	2	2	2	2	2	2	2	2	2	2	1	1	2
F.C. Ashdod	13	7	4	5	6	9	3	5	3	3	2	4	4	5	3	5	4	4	3	3	3	3	3	3	3	3
Ironi Kiryat Shmona	2	4	5	7	8	5	1	2	4	6	7	8	6	7	6	6	6	7	7	7	7	9	7	5	5	4
Hapoel Be'er Sheva	3	8	9	8	9	10	11	11	10	7	6	6	5	4	4	3	5	5	4	4	4	5	5	7	7	5
Maccabi Petah Tikva	6	2	2	1	1	4	2	1	2	2	3	2	3	3	5	4	3	3	5	5	6	4	4	4	4	6
Maccabi Netanya	8	5	7	4	5	3	4	7	6	4	4	5	8	8	7	8	7	6	6	6	5	6	6	6	6	7
Beitar Jerusalem	7	6	8	9	2	6	9	9	12	9	11	10	12	11	9	7	8	9	9	9	8	7	8	8	8	8
Hapoel Hadera	11	12	12	11	13	13	13	14	14	13	13	11	9	12	13	13	13	12	11	12	11	10	10	10	10	9
Hapoel Haifa	12	11	11	13	12	12	10	10	8	10	8	7	7	6	8	9	9	8	8	8	9	8	9	9	9	10
Bnei Sakhnin	14	14	14	14	14	14	14	12	11	12	10	12	11	10	12	12	11	11	12	13	14	14	12	13	12	11
Hapoel Tel Aviv	10	13	13	12	11	11	12	13	13	14	14	14	14	14	14	14	14	14	13	11	12	11	11	11	11	12
Hapoel Kfar Saba	5	9	3	6	7	7	7	8	9	11	12	13	13	13	10	10	10	10	10	10	10	12	13	12	13	13
Bnei Yehuda	1	3	6	3	4	2	6	4	5	8	9	9	10	9	11	11	12	13	14	14	13	13	14	14	14	14

== Championship round ==
Key numbers for pairing determination (number marks position after 26 games)

Rounds
27th	28th	29th	30th	31st	32nd	33rd	34th	35th	36th
1 – 6; 2 – 5; 3 – 4	1 – 2; 5 – 3; 6 – 4	2 – 6; 3 – 1; 4 – 5	1 – 4; 2 – 3; 6 – 5	3 – 6; 4 – 2; 5 – 1	6 – 1; 5 – 2; 4 – 3	2 – 1; 3 – 5; 4 – 6	6 – 2; 1 – 3; 5 – 4	3 – 2; 4 – 1; 5 – 6	6 – 3; 2 – 4; 1 – 5

=== Championship round table ===
Pos	Team	Pld	W	D	L	GF	GA	GD	Pts	Qualification	MHA	MTA	ASH	HBS	MPT	IKS
1	Maccabi Haifa (C)	36	24	7	5	72	29	+43	79	Qualification for the Champions League first qualifying round	—	1–1	2–0	3–2	1–1	4–0
2	Maccabi Tel Aviv	36	21	12	3	65	33	+32	75	Qualification for the Europa Conference League second qualifying round (Note: Since the 2020–21 Israel State Cup winners, Maccabi Tel Aviv, qualified for the Europa Conference League via league position, the last Europa Conference League berth was awarded to the fourth-placed team.)	2–2	—	1–1	2–1	3–1	2–2
3	F.C. Ashdod	36	15	9	12	48	39	+9	54	Qualification for the Europa Conference League second qualifying round	0–3	1–2	—	2–2	0–0	1–1
4	Hapoel Be'er Sheva	36	11	15	10	45	43	+2	48	Qualification for the Europa Conference League second qualifying round	1–1	1–1	1–2	—	2–0	3–2
5	Maccabi Petah Tikva	36	13	7	16	32	38	−6	46		1–2	0–3	1–3	0–0	—	2–0
6	Ironi Kiryat Shmona	36	12	10	14	37	45	−8	46		1–1	2–0	1–1	1–1	1–2	—

Source: Soccerway
Legend: Blue = home team win; Yellow = draw; Red = away team win.
Rules for classification: 1) Points; 2) Goal difference; 3) Matches won; 4) Goals scored; 5) Head-to-head points; 6) Head-to-head goal difference; 7) Head-to-head goals scored; 8) Play-off.
(C) Champions

=== Results by round ===
The table lists the results of teams in each round.

Team ╲ Round	27	28	29	30	31	32	33	34	35	36
Maccabi Haifa	D	D	W	W	D	W	D	W	D	W
Maccabi Tel Aviv	W	D	W	D	L	D	D	W	W	D
F.C. Ashdod	D	W	L	D	D	D	D	L	L	W
Maccabi Petah Tikva	D	W	L	D	D	L	W	L	L	L
Hapoel Be'er Sheva	L	L	D	D	D	D	D	W	W	L
Ironi Kiryat Shmona	D	L	D	L	W	D	L	L	D	D

Source: "Ligat Ha'Al – Matches".
W = Win; D = Draw; L = Loss

=== Positions by round ===
Team ╲ Round	26	27	28	29	30	31	32	33	34	35	36
Maccabi Haifa	1	2	2	2	1	1	1	1	1	1	1
Maccabi Tel Aviv	2	1	1	1	2	2	2	2	2	2	2
F.C. Ashdod	3	3	3	3	3	3	3	3	3	3	3
Hapoel Be'er Sheva	5	6	6	6	6	6	6	6	5	4	4
Maccabi Petah Tikva	6	5	4	4	4	4	5	4	4	5	5
Ironi Kiryat Shmona	4	4	5	5	5	5	4	5	6	6	6

= 2021–22 UEFA Champions League First qualifying round; = 2021–22 UEFA Europa Conference League Second qualifying round

== Relegation round ==
Key numbers for pairing determination (number marks position after 26 games)

Rounds
27th	28th	29th	30th	31st	32nd	33rd
7 – 11; 8 – 13; 9 – 12; 10 – 14	11 – 14; 12 – 10; 13 – 9; 7 – 8	8 – 11; 9 – 7; 10 – 13; 14 – 12	11 – 12; 13 – 14; 7 – 10; 8 – 9	9 – 11; 10 – 8; 14 – 7; 12 – 13	11 – 13; 7 – 12; 8 – 14; 9 – 10	10 – 11; 14 – 9; 12 – 8; 13 – 7

Due to 2 teams that play in the Bloomfield Stadium qualified to this round, and in order to insure that all the last games of this round, can be played in the same time (for purity reasons), the order of the games, has been changed, affecting fixtures 29, 30, 32 and 33.

Rounds
29th	30th	31st	32nd	33rd
11 – 13; 7 – 12; 8 – 14; 9 – 10	10 – 11; 14 – 9; 12 – 8; 13 – 7	9 – 11; 10 – 8; 14 – 7; 12 – 13	8 – 11; 9 – 7; 10 – 13; 14 – 12	11 – 12; 13 – 14; 7 – 10; 8 – 9

=== Relegation round table ===
Pos	Team	Pld	W	D	L	GF	GA	GD	Pts	Relegation	MNE	HAH	HHA	BEI	HTA	BNS	BnY	HKS
7	Maccabi Netanya	33	13	9	11	43	34	+9	48				2–0	1–0	0–1	0–0		
8	Hapoel Hadera	33	13	9	11	40	34	+6	48		2–2		3–0		0–1	1–0		
9	Hapoel Haifa	33	11	9	13	40	48	−8	42					3–1		1–0	1–3	3–2
10	Beitar Jerusalem	33	10	10	13	40	43	−3	40			0–3				3–1	2–2	3–1
11	Hapoel Tel Aviv	33	9	11	13	24	35	−11	38				0–2	0–0				2–2
12	Bnei Sakhnin	33	9	7	17	22	45	−23	34						2–3		1–1	3–0
13	Bnei Yehuda (R)	33	8	9	16	27	46	−19	33	Relegation to Liga Leumit	1–2	2–3			1–0			
14	Hapoel Kfar Saba (R)	33	6	6	21	26	49	−23	24	Relegation to Liga Leumit	0–1	1–2					1–2	

Source: Soccerway
Legend: Blue = home team win; Yellow = draw; Red = away team win.
Rules for classification: 1) Points; 2) Goal difference; 3) Matches won; 4) Goals scored; 5) Head-to-head points; 6) Head-to-head goal difference; 7) Head-to-head goals scored; 8) Play-off.
(R) Relegated

=== Results by round ===
The table lists the results of teams in each round
Team ╲ Round	27	28	29	30	31	32	33
Maccabi Netanya	D	W	L	W	W	D	W
Hapoel Hadera	L	W	W	W	W	D	W
Hapoel Haifa	L	W	L	W	W	W	L
Beitar Jerusalem	W	L	D	D	L	W	L
Hapoel Tel Aviv	W	L	W	D	D	L	W
Bnei Sakhnin	D	D	W	L	L	L	L
Bnei Yehuda	W	D	D	L	L	W	W
Hapoel Kfar Saba	L	L	L	L	D	L	L

Source: "Ligat Ha'Al – Matches".
W = Win; D = Draw; L = Loss

=== Positions by round ===
Team ╲ Round	26	27	28	29	30	31	32	33
Maccabi Netanya	7	7	7	7	7	7	7	7
Hapoel Hadera	9	9	9	8	8	8	8	8
Hapoel Haifa	10	10	10	11	10	9	9	9
Beitar Jerusalem	8	8	8	9	9	10	10	10
Hapoel Tel Aviv	12	11	12	12	11	11	11	11
Bnei Sakhnin	11	12	11	10	12	12	12	12
Bnei Yehuda	14	13	13	13	13	13	13	13
Hapoel Kfar Saba	13	14	14	14	14	14	14	14

= Relegation to Liga Leumit

== Season statistics ==
=== Top scorers ===
Rank	Player	Club	Goals
1	(Australia) (Israel) Nikita Rukavytsya	Maccabi Haifa	19
2	(Suriname) (Netherlands) Tjaronn Chery	Maccabi Haifa	12
2	(Israel) Liel Abada	Maccabi Petah Tikva	12
4	(Israel) Eliran Atar	Beitar Jerusalem	11
5	(Ghana) Eugene Ansah	Ironi Kiryat Shmona	10
5	(Serbia) Aleksandar Pešić	Maccabi Tel Aviv	10
5	(Israel) Yonatan Cohen	Maccabi Tel Aviv	10
8	(Israel) Gavriel Kanichowsky	Maccabi Netanya	9
8	(Israel) Dean David	Ashdod	9
8	(Portugal) Josué	Hapoel Be'er Sheva	9
11	(Israel) Sagiv Yehezkel (Note: Started the season at F.C. Ashdod)	Hapoel Be'er Sheva	8
11	(Brazil) Lúcio Maranhão	Ironi Kiryat Shmona	8
11	(Nigeria) Odah Marshall	Hapoel Hadera	8
11	(Israel) Hanan Maman	Hapoel Haifa	8
11	(Israel) Dolev Haziza	Maccabi Haifa	8
11	(Ghana) Godsway Donyoh	Maccabi Haifa	8
11	(Israel) Omer Fadida	Hapoel Kfar Saba	8

=== Hat-tricks ===
Player	For	Against	Result	Date	Reference
(Israel) Yonas Malede (Note: Scored four goals.)	Maccabi Netanya	Bnei Sakhnin	7–0 (H)	14 September 2020	Report
(Nigeria) Odah Marshall	Hapoel Hadera	Bnei Sakhnin	4–0 (H)	25 November 2020	Report
(Israel) Eliran Atar	Beitar Jerusalem	Hapoel Hadera	4–0 (A)	6 January 2021	Report
