= 2022–23 Israeli Premier League =

Israeli Premier League
- Season: 2022–23
- Dates: 20 August 2022 – 20 May 2023
- Champions: Maccabi Haifa
- Relegated: Sektzia Ness Ziona; Ironi Kiryat Shmona
- Champions League: Maccabi Haifa
- Europa Conference League: Hapoel Be'er Sheva; Maccabi Tel Aviv; Beitar Jerusalem
- Matches: 240
- Goals: 634 (2.64 per match)
- Top goalscorer: Omer Atzili (21 goals)
- Biggest home win: Hapoel Be'er Sheva 6–0 Hapoel Tel Aviv (9 January 2023)
- Biggest away win: Hapoel Hadera 0–6 Maccabi Tel Aviv (29 August 2022)
- Highest scoring: Beitar Jerusalem 6–3 Maccabi Netanya (17 December 2022)
- Longest winning run: 11 — Maccabi Haifa (Note: Matches 8–18)
- Longest unbeaten run: 12 — Hapoel Be'er Sheva (Note: Matches 4–15)
- Longest winless run: 15 — Ironi Kiryat Shmona (Note: Matches 2–16)
- Longest losing run: 7 — Sektzia Ness Ziona (Note: Matches 20–26)
- Highest attendance: 30,564; Maccabi Haifa 5–0 Hapoel Jerusalem (20 May 2023)
- Total attendance: 1,998,042
- Average attendance: 8,325
- All statistics correct as of 20 May 2023.

The 2022–23 Israeli Premier League, also known as Ligat ONE ZERO for sponsorship reasons, was the 24th season since its introduction in 1999 and the 81st season of top-tier football in Israel.

== Teams ==
A total of fourteen teams are competing in the league, including twelve sides from the 2021–22 season and two promoted teams from the 2021–22 Liga Leumit.

Maccabi Bnei Reineh and Sektzia Ness Ziona were promoted from the 2021–22 Liga Leumit. Maccabi Bnei Reineh was promoted for the first time in its history, Sektzia Ness Ziona returned after two seasons in the second league.

Hapoel Nof HaGalil and Maccabi Petah Tikva were relegated to the 2022–23 Liga Leumit after finishing the 2021–22 Israeli Premier League in the bottom two places.

=== Members of the 2022–23 season ===
Locations of the 2022–23 Israeli Premier League teams

==== Stadiums and locations ====
Team	Location	Stadium	Capacity
Beitar Jerusalem	Jerusalem	Teddy Stadium	31,733
Bnei Sakhnin	Sakhnin	Doha Stadium	8,500
Ashdod	Ashdod	Yud-Alef Stadium	7,800
Hapoel Be'er Sheva	Be'er Sheva	Turner Stadium	16,126
Hapoel Hadera	Hadera	Netanya Stadium (Note: The team play their home games at a neutral venue because their own ground does not meet league requirements.)	13,610
Hapoel Haifa	Haifa	Sammy Ofer Stadium	30,950
Hapoel Jerusalem	Jerusalem	Teddy Stadium	31,733
Hapoel Tel Aviv	Tel Aviv	Bloomfield Stadium	29,400
Ironi Kiryat Shmona	Kiryat Shmona	Kiryat Shmona Stadium	5,300
Maccabi Bnei Reineh	Reineh	Green Stadium	5,200
Maccabi Haifa	Haifa	Sammy Ofer Stadium	30,950
Maccabi Netanya	Netanya	Netanya Stadium	13,610
Maccabi Tel Aviv	Tel Aviv	Bloomfield Stadium	29,400
Sektzia Ness Ziona	Ness Ziona	Hamoshava Stadium	11,500

Beitar Jerusalem Hapoel Jerusalem	Hapoel Tel Aviv Maccabi Tel Aviv	Ironi Kiryat Shmona	Maccabi Netanya Hapoel Hadera	Maccabi Bnei Reineh
Teddy Stadium	Bloomfield Stadium	Kiryat Shmona Stadium	Netanya Stadium	Green Stadium
Hapoel Haifa Maccabi Haifa	F.C. Ashdod	Bnei Sakhnin	Hapoel Be'er Sheva	Sektzia Ness Ziona
Sammy Ofer Stadium	Yud-Alef Stadium	Doha Stadium	Turner Stadium	Hamoshava Stadium

=== Personnel and sponsorship ===
Team	President	Manager	Captain	Kitmaker	Shirt sponsor
Beitar Jerusalem	(Israel) Barak Abramov	(Israel) Yossi Abukasis	(Israel) Ofir Kriaf	Umbro	Geshem Holdings
Bnei Sakhnin	(Israel) Fawzi Hameed	(Israel) Kobi Refua	(Israel) Beram Kayal	Jako	Xentra
Ashdod	(Israel) Jacky Ben Zaken	(Israel) Ran Ben Shimon	(Israel) Tom Ben Zaken	Nike	Radio Jerusalem
Hapoel Be'er Sheva	(Israel) Alona Barkat	(Israel) Elyaniv Barda	(Israel) Miguel Vítor	Kelme	Victory
Hapoel Hadera	(Israel) Oren Golan	(Israel) Assaf Nimni	(Israel) Menashe Zalka	Lotto	Printer Center
Hapoel Haifa	(Israel) Yoav Katz	(Israel) Ronny Levy	(Israel) Dor Malul	Diadora	Leos
Hapoel Jerusalem	Katamon - fans club	(Israel) Ziv Arie	(Israel) Goni Naor	Macron	Advice
Hapoel Tel Aviv	Nisanov Group	(Israel) Haim Silvas	(Israel) Dan Einbinder	Adidas	Hcsra Insurance
Ironi Kiryat Shmona	(Israel) Izzy Sheratzky	(Serbia) Slobodan Drapić	(Israel) Roi Kahat	Kelme	Ituran
Maccabi Bnei Reineh	(Israel) Saeed Basoul	(Israel) Sharon Mimer	(Israel) Eyad Hutba	Zeus Sport	Boneh Renih
Maccabi Haifa	(Israel) Ya'akov Shahar	(Israel) Barak Bakhar	(Israel) Neta Lavi	Nike	Volvo
Maccabi Netanya	(Israel) Eyal Segal	(Israel) Ran Kojok	(Israel) Aviv Avraham	Lotto	Panorama North
Maccabi Tel Aviv	(Canada) Mitchell Goldhar	(Spain) Aitor Karanka	(Israel) Sheran Yeini	Fila	Israel Canada
Sektzia Ness Ziona	(Israel) Roy Ankva	(Israel) Shlomi Dora	(Israel) Yossi Ginzburg	Lotto	Almog

==== Managerial changes ====
Team	Outgoing manager	Manner of departure	Date of vacancy	Position in table	Incoming manager	Date of appointment
Hapoel Hadera	(Israel) Meni Koretski	End of contract	10 May 2022	Pre-season	(Israel) Nir Berkovic	10 May 2022
Hapoel Hadera	(Israel) Nir Berkovic	Resigned	16 May 2022	Pre-season	(Israel) Assaf Nimni	19 May 2022
Ironi Kiryat Shmona	(Serbia) Slobodan Drapić	End of contract	30 May 2022	Pre-season	(Israel) Meni Koretski	11 April 2022
Hapoel Haifa	(Israel) Elisha Levy	End of contract	30 May 2022	Pre-season	(Israel) Nir Klinger	14 May 2022
Maccabi Tel Aviv	(Serbia) Mladen Krstajić	End of contract	30 May 2022	Pre-season	(Serbia) Vladimir Ivić	19 May 2022
Maccabi Bnei Reineh	(Israel) Adham Hadiya	Sacked	7 September 2022	13th	(Israel) Sharon Mimer	7 September 2022
Hapoel Tel Aviv	(Israel) Kobi Refua	Sacked	18 September 2022	11th	(Serbia) Slobodan Drapić	19 September 2022
Hapoel Haifa	(Israel) Nir Klinger	Sacked	23 October 2022	11th	(Israel) Ronny Levy	23 October 2022
Bnei Sakhnin	(Israel) Haim Silvas	Sacked	23 October 2022	11th	(Israel) Kobi Refua	23 October 2022
Maccabi Netanya	(Israel) Benyamin Lam	Resigned	23 December 2022	10th	(Israel) Ran Kojok	23 December 2022
Hapoel Kiryat Shmona	(Israel) Meni Koretski	Resigned	23 December 2022	11th	(Israel) Nir Berkovic	23 December 2022
Sektzia Ness Ziona	(Israel) Nir Berkovic	Resigned	23 December 2022	13th	(Israel) Shlomi Dora	3 January 2023
Maccabi Tel Aviv	(Serbia) Vladimir Ivić	Resigned	3 January 2023	2nd	(Spain) Aitor Karanka	3 January 2023
Hapoel Tel Aviv	(Serbia) Slobodan Drapić	Resigned	9 January 2023	11th	(Israel) Haim Silvas	9 January 2023
Hapoel Hadera	(Israel) Assaf Nimni	Sacked	9 January 2023	10th	(Israel) Meni Koretski	9 January 2023
Hapoel Kiryat Shmona	(Israel) Nir Berkovic	Sacked	11 February 2023	13th	(Serbia) Slobodan Drapić	12 February 2023

==== Foreign players ====
The number of foreign players were restricted to six per team, while only five could have been registered to a game.
In bold: Players that have been capped for their national team.

Club	Player 1	Player 2	Player 3	Player 4	Player 5	Player 6	Non-visa player
Beitar Jerusalem	(Colombia) Danilo Asprilla	(Russia) **Sergei Borodin**	(Portugal) Miguel Silva	(Moldova) **Ion Nicolaescu**	(Ivory Coast) Trazié Thomas	(Nigeria) Fred Friday	(Russia) Grigori Morozov
Bnei Sakhnin	(Croatia) Ante Puljić	(Guadeloupe) **Ange-Freddy Plumain**	(Italy) Nicolao Dumitru	(Suriname) Fabian Sporkslede			
Ashdod	(Ghana) Abdul Zakaria Mugees	(Serbia) Nenad Cvetković	(Uganda) **Timothy Awany**	(Ghana) Montari Kamaheni	(Ghana) Ebenezer Mamatah	(Netherlands) Elton Acolatse	(Colombia) David Cuperman (France) Jordan Sebban
Hapoel Be'er Sheva	(Ghana) **Eugene Ansah**	(Portugal) Hélder Lopes	(Portugal) André Martins	(Poland) Patryk Klimala	(Russia) Magomed-Shapi Suleymanov	(Romania) **Adrian Păun**	(Argentina) Mariano Bareiro (Sweden) Tom Amos
Hapoel Hadera	(Nigeria) Steven Alfred	(Slovenia) Klemen Šturm	(Nigeria) Philip Ipole	(Belgium) Samy Bourard	(Ivory Coast) Jonathan Cissé	(Sweden) Albert Ejupi	
Hapoel Haifa	(Liberia) Mohammed Kamara	(Montenegro) **Aleksandar Šćekić**	(Haiti) **Carnejy Antoine**	(Belarus) **Denis Polyakov**	(Cyprus) **Constantinos Soteriou**	(Lithuania) **Arvydas Novikovas**	
Ironi Kiryat Shmona	(Ivory Coast) Senin Sebai	(Lithuania) **Džiugas Bartkus**	(Belarus) **Ivan Bakhar**	(Brazil) Marlon	(Brazil) Gian		
Hapoel Jerusalem	(Nigeria) Adebayo Adeleye	(Czech Republic) Ondřej Bačo	(Ivory Coast) Yao Eloge Koffi	(Ivory Coast) **William Togui**	(Democratic Republic of the Congo) **Jordan Botaka**	(Ivory Coast) Cédric Franck Don	(Ethiopia) Awaka Ashta
Hapoel Tel Aviv	(Netherlands) Godfried Roemeratoe	(Montenegro) **Aleksandar Boljević**	(Spain) Pablo González	(Slovenia) Alen Ožbolt	(Lithuania) **Emilijus Zubas**	(Croatia) Hrvoje Ilić	(Guinea) **Antoine Conte**
Maccabi Bnei Reineh	(Hungary) Márk Koszta	(Brazil) Gustavo Marmentini	(Austria) Lukas Spendlhofer	(Guinea-Bissau) **Sambinha**	(Ghana) Richard Boateng	(Madagascar) **Anicet Abel**	
Maccabi Haifa	(Suriname) **Tjaronn Chery**	(France) Dylan Batubinsika	(Sweden) **Daniel Sundgren**	(France) Pierre Cornud	(Haiti) **Frantzdy Pierrot**	(Senegal) **Abdoulaye Seck**	(United States) Josh Cohen (Republic of the Congo) **Mavis Tchibota** (Australia) **Nikita Rukavytsya** (Niger) **Ali Mohamed**
Maccabi Netanya	(Cameroon) Boris Enow	(Bulgaria) **Plamen Galabov**	(Ghana) **Patrick Twumasi**	(France) Nassim Ouammou	(Ukraine) Stanislav Bilenkyi	(Serbia) Igor Zlatanović	
Maccabi Tel Aviv	(Spain) Enric Saborit	(Portugal) André Geraldes	(Serbia) **Đorđe Jovanović**	(Ivory Coast) Parfait Guiagon	(Netherlands) Derrick Luckassen	(Romania) Rareș Ilie	(Brazil) Daniel Tenenbaum (Netherlands) Joris van Overeem
Sektzia Ness Ziona	(Brazil) Ari Moura	(Italy) Cristian Battocchio	(Georgia (country)) Levan Kutalia	(Nigeria) Muhammed Usman Edu	(Ivory Coast) Stephane Acka		(Bulgaria) **Yoni Stoyanov**

== Regular season ==
=== Regular season table ===
Pos	Team	Pld	W	D	L	GF	GA	GD	Pts	Qualification or relegation
1	Maccabi Haifa	26	20	2	4	51	24	+27	62	Qualification for the Championship round
2	Hapoel Be'er Sheva	26	18	4	4	52	19	+33	58	Qualification for the Championship round
3	Maccabi Tel Aviv	26	15	7	4	53	15	+38	52	Qualification for the Championship round
4	Maccabi Netanya	26	10	7	9	33	38	−5	37	Qualification for the Championship round
5	Hapoel Jerusalem	26	9	9	8	30	26	+4	36	Qualification for the Championship round
6	Ashdod	26	9	9	8	32	30	+2	36	Qualification for the Championship round
7	Beitar Jerusalem	26	9	4	13	38	47	−9	31	Transfer to the Relegation round
8	Hapoel Haifa	26	6	12	8	25	28	−3	30	Transfer to the Relegation round
9	Bnei Sakhnin	26	7	9	10	26	30	−4	30	Transfer to the Relegation round
10	Hapoel Hadera	26	6	11	9	26	41	−15	29	Transfer to the Relegation round
11	Hapoel Tel Aviv	26	6	9	11	28	42	−14	27	Transfer to the Relegation round
12	Maccabi Bnei Reineh	26	5	9	12	23	42	−19	24	Transfer to the Relegation round
13	Ironi Kiryat Shmona	26	3	12	11	27	39	−12	21	Transfer to the Relegation round
14	Sektzia Ness Ziona	26	3	8	15	23	46	−23	17	Transfer to the Relegation round

Source: Soccerway
Rules for classification: 1) Points; 2) Goal difference; 3) Matches won; 4) Goals scored; 5) Head-to-head points; 6) Head-to-head goal difference; 7) Head-to-head goals scored; 8) Play-off.

=== Regular season results ===
Home \ Away	MHA	HBS	MTA	MNE	HJE	ASH	BEI	HHA	BnS	HAH	HTA	IKS	MBR	SNZ
Maccabi Haifa	—	2–0	2–0	4–1	2–1	3–1	2–1	4–1	3–1	1–0	5–2	2–0	0–0	3–1
Hapoel Be'er Sheva	1–2	—	2–0	2–2	0–0	1–2	3–2	2–2	1–0	3–0	6–0	2–1	2–0	1–1
Maccabi Tel Aviv	3–0	1–0	—	3–0	1–2	3–0	4–0	1–0	1–1	5–0	3–0	3–1	5–0	1–1
Maccabi Netanya	0–2	1–2	2–1	—	0–2	0–2	4–1	1–0	0–0	1–0	0–2	1–0	2–1	3–0
Hapoel Jerusalem	3–0	1–4	0–3	0–2	—	3–0	1–1	2–2	1–2	1–1	0–0	1–1	0–1	1–0
Ashdod	3–1	0–1	0–0	2–3	1–1	—	0–2	4–0	1–1	1–1	1–0	1–1	3–0	1–0
Beitar Jerusalem	1–4	0–5	2–2	6–3	0–1	2–1	—	0–0	2–1	0–2	1–3	2–0	2–3	3–2
Hapoel Haifa	0–1	0–1	1–1	0–0	1–0	1–1	0–0	—	1–2	3–0	2–0	1–0	0–0	0–1
Bnei Sakhnin	0–1	0–1	0–1	0–0	2–1	1–1	2–0	1–2	—	1–4	1–1	1–3	1–1	2–0
Hapoel Hadera	1–1	0–3	0–6	3–1	0–0	0–2	2–1	1–1	1–3	—	0–0	1–1	2–2	0–0
Hapoel Tel Aviv	0–1	2–3	0–0	1–1	1–3	1–2	2–1	3–3	0–2	0–0	—	2–1	2–0	1–1
Ironi Kiryat Shmona	2–3	0–2	1–1	2–2	1–1	1–1	0–3	1–1	1–1	2–2	0–1	—	1–1	3–3
Maccabi Bnei Reineh	1–0	0–3	0–2	1–2	0–2	1–1	0–2	1–1	2–0	1–2	1–1	0–1	—	3–2
Sektzia Ness Ziona	0–2	0–1	0–2	1–1	0–2	2–0	0–3	0–2	0–0	1–3	4–3	0–2	3–3	—

Source: "Ligat Ha'Al – Matches".
Legend: Blue = home team win; Yellow = draw; Red = away team win.

== Championship round ==
Key numbers for pairing determination (number marks position after 26 games)

Rounds
27th	28th	29th	30th	31st	32nd	33rd	34th	35th	36th
1 – 6; 2 – 5; 3 – 4	1 – 2; 5 – 3; 6 – 4	2 – 6; 3 – 1; 4 – 5	1 – 4; 2 – 3; 6 – 5	3 – 6; 4 – 2; 5 – 1	6 – 1; 5 – 2; 4 – 3	2 – 1; 3 – 5; 4 – 6	6 – 2; 1 – 3; 5 – 4	3 – 2; 4 – 1; 5 – 6	6 – 3; 2 – 4; 1 – 5

=== Championship round table ===
Pos	Team	Pld	W	D	L	GF	GA	GD	Pts	Qualification	MHA	HBS	MTA	HJE	MNE	ASH
1	Maccabi Haifa (C)	36	27	3	6	76	34	+42	81 (Note: Maccabi Haifa had 3 points deducted.)	Qualification for the Champions League first qualifying round	—	1–0	3–1	5–0	4–1	2–1
2	Hapoel Be'er Sheva	36	24	5	7	65	29	+36	74 (Note: Hapoel Be'er Sheva had 3 points deducted.)	Qualification for the Europa Conference League second qualifying round	2–1	—	1–2	1–0	2–0	3–1
3	Maccabi Tel Aviv	36	21	10	5	69	23	+46	73	Qualification for the Europa Conference League second qualifying round	1–1	3–0	—	2–1	2–0	1–1
4	Hapoel Jerusalem	36	12	9	15	38	44	−6	45		2–1	1–2	0–2	—	1–4	0–1
5	Maccabi Netanya	36	12	9	15	44	58	−14	45		1–5	1–1	0–0	0–2	—	2–0
6	Ashdod	36	11	10	15	41	46	−5	43		1–2	0–1	1–2	0–1	3–2	—

Source: Soccerway
Legend: Blue = home team win; Yellow = draw; Red = away team win.
Rules for classification: 1) Points; 2) Goal difference; 3) Matches won; 4) Goals scored; 5) Head-to-head points; 6) Head-to-head goal difference; 7) Head-to-head goals scored; 8) Play-off.
(C) Champions

=== Results by round ===
The table lists the results of teams in each round.

Team ╲ Round	27	28	29	30	31	32	33	34	35	36
Maccabi Haifa	W	W	D	W	L	W	L	W	W	W
Hapoel Be'er Sheva	W	L	W	L	D	W	W	W	L	W
Maccabi Tel Aviv	W	W	D	W	D	D	W	L	W	W
Hapoel Jerusalem	L	L	W	W	W	L	L	L	L	L
Maccabi Netanya	L	L	L	L	D	D	W	W	L	L
F.C. Ashdod	L	W	L	L	D	L	L	L	W	L

Source: "Ligat Ha'Al – Matches".
W = Win; D = Draw; L = Loss

=== Positions by round ===
Team ╲ Round	26	27	28	29	30	31	32	33	34	35	36
Maccabi Haifa	1	1	1	1	1	1	1	1	1	1	1
Hapoel Be'er Sheva	2	2	2	2	2	2	2	2	2	2	2
Maccabi Tel Aviv	3	3	3	3	3	3	3	3	3	3	3
Hapoel Jerusalem	5	5	6	4	4	4	4	4	4	4	4
Maccabi Netanya	4	4	5	6	6	6	6	5	5	5	5
F.C. Ashdod	6	6	4	5	5	5	5	6	6	6	6

= 2023–24 UEFA Champions League First qualifying round; = 2023–24 UEFA Europa Conference League Second qualifying round

== Relegation round ==
Key numbers for pairing determination (number marks position after 26 games)

Rounds
27th	28th	29th	30th	31st	32nd	33rd
7 – 11; 8 – 13; 9 – 12; 10 – 14	11 – 14; 12 – 10; 13 – 9; 7 – 8	8 – 11; 9 – 7; 10 – 13; 14 – 12	11 – 12; 13 – 14; 7 – 10; 8 – 9	9 – 11; 10 – 8; 14 – 7; 12 – 13	11 – 13; 7 – 12; 8 – 14; 9 – 10	10 – 11; 14 – 9; 12 – 8; 13 – 7

=== Relegation round table ===
Pos	Team	Pld	W	D	L	GF	GA	GD	Pts	Relegation	HHA	BEI	BnS	HTA	MBR	HAH	IKS	SNZ
7	Hapoel Haifa	33	9	14	10	35	35	0	41				2–2	1–0			1–1	0–1
8	Beitar Jerusalem	33	13	4	16	52	58	−6	40 (Note: Beitar Jerusalem had 3 points deducted.)	Qualification for the Europa Conference League second qualifying round (Note: Beitar Jerusalem qualified for the Europa Conference League second qualifying round as the 2022–23 Israel State Cup winners.)	2–0			2–1	0–1	2–1		
9	Bnei Sakhnin	33	8	13	12	39	44	−5	37			4–3		0–1	2–2	2–3		
10	Hapoel Tel Aviv	33	9	10	14	37	51	−14	36 (Note: Hapoel Tel Aviv had 1 point deducted.)						1–2		2–2	2–1
11	Maccabi Bnei Reineh	33	8	11	14	32	54	−22	35		0–4					1–1	1–3	
12	Hapoel Hadera	33	7	13	13	35	53	−18	34		1–2			1–2			1–1	1–2
13	Ironi Kiryat Shmona (R)	33	5	17	11	40	49	−9	32	Relegation to Liga Leumit		3–2	2–2					1–1
14	Sektzia Ness Ziona (R)	33	5	10	18	31	56	−25	25	Relegation to Liga Leumit		1–3	1–1		1–2			

Source: Soccerway
Legend: Blue = home team win; Yellow = draw; Red = away team win.
Rules for classification: 1) Points; 2) Goal difference; 3) Matches won; 4) Goals scored; 5) Head-to-head points; 6) Head-to-head goal difference; 7) Head-to-head goals scored; 8) Play-off.
(R) Relegated

=== Results by round ===
The table lists the results of teams in each round
Team ╲ Round	27	28	29	30	31	32	33
Hapoel Haifa	D	L	W	D	W	L	W
Beitar Jerusalem	W	W	L	W	W	L	L
Hapoel Tel Aviv	L	W	L	L	W	D	W
Bnei Sakhnin	D	D	W	D	L	L	D
Maccabi Bnei Reineh	D	D	W	W	L	W	L
Hapoel Hadera	L	D	D	L	L	W	L
Ironi Kiryat Shmona	D	D	D	D	W	D	W
Sektzia Ness Ziona	W	L	L	D	L	W	D

Source: "Ligat Ha'Al – Relegation Round – Matches".
W = Win; D = Draw; L = Loss

== Season statistics ==
=== Top scorers ===
As of 21 May 2023

Rank	Player	Club	Goals
1	(Israel) Omer Atzili	Maccabi Haifa	21
2	(Israel) Eran Zahavi	Maccabi Tel Aviv	20
3	(Colombia) Danilo Asprilla	Beitar Jerusalem	17
4	(Serbia) Đorđe Jovanović	Maccabi Tel Aviv	15
4	(Moldova) Ion Nicolaescu	Beitar Jerusalem	15
4	(Serbia) Igor Zlatanović	Maccabi Netanya	15
7	(Israel) Guy Melamed	Bnei Sakhnin	12
7	(Israel) Itamar Shviro	Ironi Kiryat Shmona	12
9	(Israel) Rotem Hatuel	Hapoel Be'er Sheva	11
9	(Slovenia) Alen Ožbolt	Hapoel Tel Aviv	11
9	(Israel) Guy Badash	Hapoel Jerusalem	11

=== Hat-tricks ===
Player	Club	Against	Result	Date
(Serbia) Igor Zlatanović	Maccabi Netanya	Beitar Jerusalem	4–1 (H)	20 August 2022
(Israel) Omer Atzili	Maccabi Haifa	Maccabi Netanya	4–1 (H)	27 August 2022
(Moldova) Ion Nicolaescu (4)	Beitar Jerusalem	Maccabi Netanya	6–3 (H)	17 December 2022
(Hungary) Márk Koszta	Maccabi Bnei Reineh	Sektzia Ness Ziona	3–2 (H)	4 March 2023
(Israel) Omer Atzili	Maccabi Haifa	Hapoel Haifa	4–1 (H)	6 March 2023

(4) - Scored 4 goals

=== Discipline ===
As of 21 May 2023

==== Player ====
- Most yellow cards: 12
  - (Portugal) Hélder Lopes (Hapoel Be'er Sheva)
  - (Israel) Diya Lababidi (Hapoel Hadera)
- Most red cards: 3
  - (Israel) Beram Kayal (Bnei Sakhnin)

==== Club ====
- Most yellow cards: 90
  - Maccabi Netanya
- Most red cards: 8
  - Sektzia Ness Ziona
  - Bnei Sakhnin

== Average attendances ==
Pos	Team	Total	High	Low	Average	Change
1	Maccabi Haifa	519,057	30,564	24,753	28,837	+14.2%
2	Maccabi Tel Aviv	375,570	27,642	11,743	20,865	+15.4%
3	Hapoel Be'er Sheva	220,708	15,114	7,438	12,262	+8.7%
4	Hapoel Tel Aviv	14,776	24,119	6,791	11,367	−0.9%
5	Beitar Jerusalem	191,717	21,632	4,071	11,277	+49.1%
6	Maccabi Netanya	119,217	12,960	3,484	7,012	+0.3%
7	Hapoel Haifa	23,114	26,900	779	4,889	+20.7%
8	Hapoel Jerusalem	82,874	18,755	592	4,604	+23.6%
9	Bnei Sakhnin	52,164	5,656	1,135	3,068	−9.8%
10	Ashdod	52,801	6,497	600	2,933	+145.4%
11	Sektzia Ness Ziona	40,377	10,358	127	2,524	n/a^{(Note: Team played last season in Liga Leumit.)}
12	Hapoel Hadera	42,093	8,820	401	2,476	−0.3%
13	Ironi Kiryat Shmona	34,535	5,202	772	2,158	+63.0%
14	Maccabi Bnei Reineh	29,444	4,769	766	1,840	n/a
	League total	1,991,447	30,564	127	8,438	+41.5%

Updated to games played on 20 May 2023
