= List of Maccabi Haifa F.C. managers =

For main article please see Maccabi Haifa Football Club

Managers from 1946 to present.

Name	Nationality	Seasons	Honours
Yisrael Schwartz	British Mandate for Palestine	1946–1947	1 Second Division title
Taurentauer	Hungary	1950–1952	
Otto Schlefenberg	Israel	1952–1954	
Eli Fuchs	Israel	1954–1956	
Andor Kisch	Hungary	1956–1957	
Ariyeh Koch	Israel	1957–1959	
David Farkash	Israel	1959–1961	
Alex Forbes	Scotland	1961–1962	
Andor Kisch	Hungary	1962	
Otto Schlefenberg	Israel	1962–1963	1 State Cup; 1 Israeli Supercup
Vasil Spasov	Bulgaria	1963–1965	
Israel Halivner	Israel	1965	
Avraham Menchel	Israel	1965–1969	1 Second Division title
Edmond Schmilovich	Israel	1969–1970	
Jonny Hardy	Scotland - Israel	1970–1972	
Avraham Menchel	Israel	1972–1974	
Ori Weinberg	Israel	1974–1975	1 Second Division title
Shimon Shinar	Israel	1975–1977	
Moshe Sasson	Israel	1977	
Eli Fuchs	Israel	1977	
Jonny Hardy	Scotland - Israel	1977–1978	
Eran Kulik	Israel	1978–1979	
Mordechai Spiegler	Israel	1979	
Jonny Hardy	Scotland - Israel	1979–1982	
Jack Mansell	England	1982–1983	
Shlomo Scharf	Israel	1983–1987	2 First Division title 1 Israeli Supercup
Dror Kashtan	Israel	1987–1988	
Amatzia Levkovich	Israel	1988–1990	1 First Division title 1 Israeli Supercup
Shlomo Scharf	Israel	1990–1992	1 First Division title 1 State Cup
Giora Spiegel	Israel	1993–1998	1 First Division title 2 State Cup; 1 Toto Cup
Daniel Brailovsky	Israel	1998	1 State Cup
Dušan Uhrin	Czech Republic	1998–1999	
Eli Cohen	Israel	1999–2000	
Ronny Levy	Israel	2000	
Avram Grant	Israel	2000–2002	2 First Division title
Itzhak Shum	Israel	2002–2003	1 Toto Cup
Ronny Levy	Israel	2003–2008	3 First Division title 2 Toto Cup
Elisha Levy	Israel	2008–2012	2 First Division title
Reuven Atar	Israel	2012	
Arik Benado	Israel	2012–2014	
Aleksandar Stanojević	Serbia	2014	
Marko Balbul	Israel	2014–2015	
Ronny Levy	Israel	2015–2016	1 State Cup
René Meulensteen	Netherlands	2016–2017	
Guy Luzon	Israel	2017	
Fred Rutten	Netherlands	2018	
Eli Guttman	Israel	2018	
Marko Balbul	Israel	2018–2020	
Barak Bakhar	Israel	2020–2023	3 First Division title 1 Israeli Supercup; 1 Toto Cup
Messay Dego	Israel	2023–2024	1 Israeli Supercup
Barak Bakhar	Israel	2024–2025	
Diego Flores	Argentina	2025	
Barak Bakhar	Israel	2025–2026	
Ran Ben-Shimon	Israel	2026 -	
