= 1962 Israel Super Cup =

Hapoel Petah Tikva	Maccabi Haifa
2	2
- Date: 23 January 1963
- Venue: Bloomfield Stadium, Tel Aviv
- Referee: Otto Fried
- Attendance: 1,000

The 1962 Israel Super Cup was the second Israel Super Cup, an annual Israeli football match played between the winners of the previous season's Top Division and Israel State Cup. As the match was not set by the Israel Football Association, it was considered an unofficial cup, with the cup being donated by Ilanshil-Polio, an Israeli organization dedicated to aid Poliomyelitis victims, with proceedings going towards the organization.

The match, held on 23 January 1963, ended in a 2–2 draw and the cup was shared by the teams.

== Match details ==
22 September 1963

Hapoel Petah Tikva	2–2	Maccabi Haifa
Peterburg 33' (pen.); Ratzabi 41'		Menchel 52'; Almani 63'

Bloomfield Stadium, Tel Aviv
Attendance: 1,000
Referee: Otto Fried
