= Otto Schlefenberg =

Footballer (1917–1991)

Otto Schlefenberg אוטו שלפנברג
Personal information
- Date of birth: 1917
- Place of birth: Austria
- Date of death: 1991 (aged 73–74)
- Position: Midfielder

Youth career
- Hakoah Wien

Senior career*
Years	Team	Apps	(Gls)
1940–1950	Maccabi Haifa	20	(9)

Managerial career
- 1952–1954: Maccabi Haifa
- 1957–1958: Hapoel Tiberias
- 1958–1959: Hapoel Kiryat Shmona
- 1959–1960: Hapoel Safed
- 1960–1961: Maccabi Hadera
- 1961–1962: Maccabi Pardes Hanna
- 1962–1963: Maccabi Haifa
- 1963: Hakoah Maccabi Ramat Gan
- 1963–1965: Hapoel Ashkelon
- 1965–1967: Maccabi Netanya
- 1967: Hapoel Mahane Yehuda
- 1968: Hapoel Sderot
- 1968–1969: Hapoel Ashkelon
- 1969–1970: Hapoel Sderot
- 1971–1972: Hapoel Kiryat Malakhi
- * Club domestic league appearances and goals

Otto Schlefenberg (Hebrew: אוטו שלפנברג; 1917–1991) was an Austrian-Israeli footballer and manager. He is best known for his years at Maccabi Haifa where he started his managerial career.

== Playing career ==
Born in Austria, Schlefenberg played in Hakoah Vienna before moving to Mandatory Palestine, where he joined Maccabi Haifa, for whom he made his debut in 4 May 1940, in a Liga Bet match against Maccabi Binyamina. In 1950, Schlefenberg withdrew from active play.

== Coaching career ==
Schalfenberg re-arranged Maccabi Haifa's youth team, Maccabi Shlomo Haifa, and coached it for two years before being appointed as head coach for the club in 1952, a post he held for the next two years, promoting many of the youth team's players, such as Jonny Hardy and Avraham Menchel to the senior side.

After leaving Maccabi Haifa, Schlefenberg coached Hapoel Tiberias, Maccabi Hadera and Maccabi Pardes Hanna. In 1962 Schlefenberg returned to Maccabi Haifa, as a replacement for coach Alex Forbes and led the club to winning its first major trophy, the State Cup.

Schlefenberg resigned from coaching Maccabi Haifa in February 1963, and later coached Hakoah Ramat Gan, Hapoel Ashkelon, Maccabi Netanya, Hapoel MahaneYehuda, Hapoel Sderot and Hapoel Kiryat Malakhi.

== Honours ==
=== Player ===
- Liga Bet (second tier):
  - 1946–47

=== Coach ===
- Israel State Cup:
  - 1961–62
- Israel Super Cup:
  - 1962 (shared)
- Liga Bet (third tier):
  - 1963–64 (with Hapoel Ashkelon)
  - 1966–68 (with Hapoel Sderot)
