= Hapoel Rishon LeZion F.C. =

Israeli football club

Hapoel Rishon leZion
- Full name: Hapoel Rishon LeZion הפועל ראשון לציון
- Nickname: Rishonia
- Founded: 1940; 86 years ago
- Ground: Haberfeld Stadium, Rishon LeZion
- Capacity: 6,000
- Owner: Amos Luzon
- Manager: Elad Brown
- League: Liga Leumit
- 2025–26: Liga Leumit, 8th of 16
| Home colours | Away colours |

Hapoel Rishon LeZion F.C. (Hebrew: הפועל ראשון לציון) is an Israeli football club based in the city of Rishon LeZion, which currently plays in Liga Leumit, Israel's second football division. Home matches are hosted at the Haberfeld Stadium. In 1991, the club changed its name to Hapoel Ironi Rishon LeZion (Hebrew: הפועל עירוני ראשון לציון), and in June 2008 the name was switched back to Hapoel Rishon LeZion following a change in ownership.

== History ==
A chart showing the progress of Hapoel Rishon LeZion through the Israeli football league system, from 1938 to the present

Hapoel Rishon LeZion was one of the first clubs in the history of league football in Israel. The football section of the Sports club was established in 1929, and played several matches since 1933, including competing at the Palestine Cup in 1937 and 1939. The club was formally established in 1940.

Its best achievements were runner-up of the Israel State Cup in 1946 and 1996. On both occasions it lost to Maccabi Tel Aviv. Following its cup final in 1996, it played in UEFA Cup Winners' Cup, but was eliminated in the qualifying round by Constructorul Chisinau of Moldova on away goals rule (0–1, 3–2).

The club played at the top division in Mandatory Palestine for the first time at the 1941–42 season and after the Israeli Declaration of Independence, became founder members of the Israeli League in 1949. In 1951–52, the club finished second bottom and dropped to the second tier.

Between 1952 and 1994 the club played just three seasons in the top division: 1978–79, 1980–81 (where they finished sixth) and 1981–82. In the 1991–92 season, while playing in Liga Alef, the third tier, it added the word Ironi to its name, and in the next two seasons, made two successive promotions and returned to the top flight once again after winning Liga Artzit in the 1993–94 season. This time the club managed to stay nine consecutive seasons in the top league until it was relegated to the second tier, (Liga Leumit), at the end of the 2002–03 season, and three seasons later dropped further down to Liga Artzit, the third tier at the time.

In June 2008, the businessmen Raviv Sapir and Ron Hadad acquired ownership of the club and secured guarantees from the Rishon LeZion municipality to cover the estimated 6 million NIS debt of the club, along with a guarantee to economically support the clubs youth academy with an approximate 800,000 NIS annually. following the change in ownership the club changed its name back to Hapoel Rishon LeZion and was promoted to the second tier (Known as Liga Leumit).

In 2010–11, the club was promoted to the Israeli Premier League, the top tier. They were relegated back to Liga Leumit the following season.

On 4 December 2012, Hapoel Rishon LeZion won the 2012–13 Toto Cup Leumit.

In 2017–18, the club was just one point short of being promoted to the top tier, The Israeli Premier League, finishing third. In the following year, 2018–19, the club finished twelfth, and narrowly avoided relegation.

In 2023-24, on 28 July 2023, the club sold Mohamed Bamba, an Ivorian striker who played for the club and the youth team for 3.5 years, to Austrian club Wolfsberger AC for 200,000€ and a 20% sell-on fee. After scoring 8 goals and 4 assists in 17 games in the 2023–24 Austrian Football Bundesliga and 2023–24 Austrian Cup, Wolfsberger AC sold Bamba to French club FC Lorient for 5,000,000€, securing Rishon 1,000,000€ from the sell-on. Bamba went on to score 8 goals and 3 assists in 16 games in the 2023–24 Ligue 1.

Season-by-season
| Season | League Tier | League Position | Israeli Cup | Toto Cup | Notes |
|---|---|---|---|---|---|
| 2004–05 | 2 | 6th | Round of 32 | X | |
| 2005–06 | 2 | 11th | Round of 16 | X | No toto cup before 2006–07. |
| 2006–07 | 3 | 2nd | DNP | X | No toto cup in 3rd tier |
| 2007–08 | 2 | 11th | Round of 16 | 9th-10th | |
| 2008–09 | 3 | 4th | Round of 64 | X | No toto cup in 3rd tier |
| 2009–10 | 2 | 8th | Round of 64 | 2nd | |
| 2010–11 | 2 | 2nd | Round of 16 | 5th-8th | |
| 2011–12 | 1 | 15th | Round of 32 | 9th-16th | |
| 2012–13 | 2 | 6th | Semi Finals | 1st | |
| 2013–14 | 2 | 11th | Quarter Finals | X | The Toto Cup was not held that year. |
| 2014–15 | 2 | 10th | Round of 32 | 9th-16th | |
| 2015–16 | 2 | 12th | Round of 16 | 9th-16th | |
| 2016–17 | 2 | 10th | Round of 16 | 9th-16th | |
| 2017–18 | 2 | 3rd | Round of 32 | 5th-8th | |
| 2018–19 | 2 | 12th | Round of 64 | 9-10th | |
| 2019–20 | 2 | 5th | Round of 32 | 3rd-4th | |
| 2020–21 | 2 | 4th | Round of 32 | 5th-6th | |
| 2021–22 | 2 | 14th | Round of 32 | 7th | Won the Promotion/relegation playoff |
| 2022–23 | 2 | 12th | Round of 32 | 1st | |
| 2023-24 | 2 | 13th | Round of 16 | 15th-16th | |
| 2024-25 | 2 | 13th | Seventh round | th-th | |

== Current squad ==
As to 5 August 2026

| No. | Pos. | Nation | Player |
|---|---|---|---|
| 1 | GK | ISR | Shahar Amsalem |
| 5 | DF | ISR | Shavit Elgabi |
| 8 | MF | ISR | Tom Berkovic |
| 9 | FW | ISR | Yehuda Balay |
| 10 | FW | NGR | Ezekiel Henty |
| 11 | FW | ISR | Roey Ben Shimon |
| 14 | MF | ISR | Daniel Bohadana |
| 15 | MF | ISR | Liel Chane |
| 17 | FW | LTU | Eligijus Jankauskas |
| 20 | DF | ISR | Dolev Azulay |
| 21 | DF | ISR | Liam Levi |

| No. | Pos. | Nation | Player |
|---|---|---|---|
| 24 | MF | ISR | Yosef Balata |
| 27 | FW | ISR | Hisham Taha |
| 30 | MF | ISR | Ido Davidovich |
| 31 | DF | ISR | Peleg Daudi |
| 33 | DF | ISR | Ori Tzaadon |
| 35 | MF | ISR | Roei Yaron |
| 36 | DF | ISR | Shay Konstantini |
| 55 | GK | ISR | Eliran Gomalski |
| 77 | MF | ISR | Ronen Peretz |
| 99 | DF | ISR | Haroun Shapso |

== International former players ==
Europe

- (Bosnia and Herzegovina) Sejad Halilović (had one cap for croatia before Bosnia got their independence)
- (Belarus) Yevgeni Kashentsev
- (Belarus) Gennadi Tumilovich
- (Soviet Union) Ivan Yaremchuk
- (Belgium) Marc Van Der Linden
- (Croatia) Dean Racunica
- (Hungary) Gábor Márton
- (Poland) Tomasz Cebula
- (Slovakia) Karol Schulz

Asia

- (Turkmenistan) Andriy Zavyalov

Africa

- (Ivory Coast) Paul Akouokou
- (Ivory Coast) Mohamed Bamba
- (Nigeria) Patrick Ovie
- (Sierra Leone) Emmanuel Samadia
- (Uganda) Luwagga Kizito
- (Zambia) Gift Mphande

Central and North America

- (Guatemala) Matan Peleg

Israel

- (Israel) Rami Gershon
- (Israel) Omer Atzili
- (Israel) Baruch Dego
- (Israel) Ya'akov Hodorov
- (Israel) Shay Holtzman
- (Israel) Eyal Ben Ami
- (Israel) Itamar Shviro

== Managers ==
- (Israel) Eli Cohen (1994-95)
- (Israel) Arik Gilrovich (2008–09)
- (Israel) Nissan Yehezkel (2010–12)
- (Israel) Eyal Lahman (2012–13)
- (Israel) Sharon Mimer (2013–15)
- (Israel) Ofir Haim (2015–16)
- (Israel) Gili Levanda (2016)
- (Israel) Nir Berkovic (2016–2018)
- (Israel) Ron Marcus (2018–2019)
- (Israel) Nir Berkovic (2019)
- (Israel) Ofer Taselpapa (2019–2020)
- (Israel) Meni Koretski (2020)
- (Israel) Ismaeel Amar (2020–2022)
- (Israel) Amir Nussbaum (2022–2023)
- (Israel) Yuval Naim (2023-)

== Honours ==
=== League ===
| Honour | No. | Years |
|---|---|---|
| Second tier | 1 | 1993–94 |
| Third tier | 3 | 1964–65, 1988–89, 1992–93 |

=== Cups ===
| Honour | No. | Years |
|---|---|---|
| Toto Cup (second division) | 2 | 2012–13, 2022–23 |

== European record ==
| Season | Round | Opponents | Home leg | Away leg | Aggregate |
|---|---|---|---|---|---|
| 1996–97 | Qualifying Round | (Moldova) Constructorul Chişinău | 3–2 | 0–1 | 3–3 (a) |
