= Shalom Peterburg =

Israeli footballer

Shalom Peterburg שלום פטרבורג
Personal information
- Date of birth: 4 March 1941 (age 85)

International career
Years	Team	Apps	(Gls)
1961	Israel	4	(0)

Shalom Peterburg (Hebrew: שלום פטרבורג; 4 March 1941 – 30 November 2012) was an Israeli footballer. He played in four matches for the Israel national football team in 1961.
