= Nissan Yehezkel =

Israeli football manager

Nissan Yehezkel ניסן יחזקאל
Personal information
- Full name: Nissan Yehezkel
- Date of birth: September 25, 1971 (age 55)
- Place of birth: Tel Aviv, Israel

Managerial career
- Years: Team
- 2008–2010: Bnei Sakhnin (assistant)
- 2010: Hapoel Bnei Lod
- 2010–2012: Hapoel Rishon LeZion
- 2012: Ironi Ramat HaSharon
- 2013–2014: Hapoel Petah Tikva
- 2014: Hapoel Marmorek
- 2014–2015: Maccabi Ahi Nazareth
- 2015–2016: Hapoel Afula
- 2016: Maccabi Ahi Nazareth
- 2016–2017: Bnei Yehuda
- 2017–2018: Hapoel Marmorek
- 2018–2019: Beitar Jerusalem (assistant)
- 2019: Bnei Sakhnin

Nissan Yehezkel (Hebrew: ניסן יחזקאל; born September 25, 1971) is an Israeli football manager.

== Honours ==
- Israeli Second Division:
  - Runner-up (2): 2010–11, 2013–14
