= Kfir Edri =

Israeli footballer

Kfir Edri כפיר אדרי
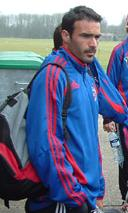

Personal information
- Full name: Kfir Edri
- Date of birth: October 12, 1976 (age 50)
- Place of birth: Dimona, Israel
- Positions: Left midfielder; defender

Team information
- Current team: Bnei Yehuda Tel Aviv

Youth career
- Hapoel Dimona

Senior career*
Years	Team	Apps	(Gls)
1995–1998	Hapoel Dimona		
1998–2001	Maccabi Tel Aviv	61	(11)
2001	F.C. Ashdod	30	(5)
2001–2002	Hapoel Be'er Sheva	29	(2)
2002–2003	Beitar Jerusalem	24	(2)
2003–2005	Hapoel Tel Aviv	55	(10)
2005–2006	Maccabi Petah Tikva	30	(2)
2006–2007	Maccabi Herzliya	31	(2)
2007	Hapoel Kfar Saba	2	(0)
2007–2008	Maccabi Herzliya	29	(1)
2008–2015	Bnei Yehuda Tel Aviv	175	(3)

Managerial career
- 2017: Bnei Yehuda Tel Aviv (caretaker)
- * Club domestic league appearances and goals

Kfir Edri (Hebrew: כפיר אדרי; born October 12, 1976) is an Israeli former footballer who now works as a chairman for Bnei Yehuda Tel Aviv.

== Honours ==
=== As a Player ===
- Toto Cup: 1998–99, 2006–07

=== As a Manager ===
- Israel State Cup: 2017
