= Eli Cohen (footballer, born 1951) =

Israeli footballer and manager

Eli Cohen אלי כהן
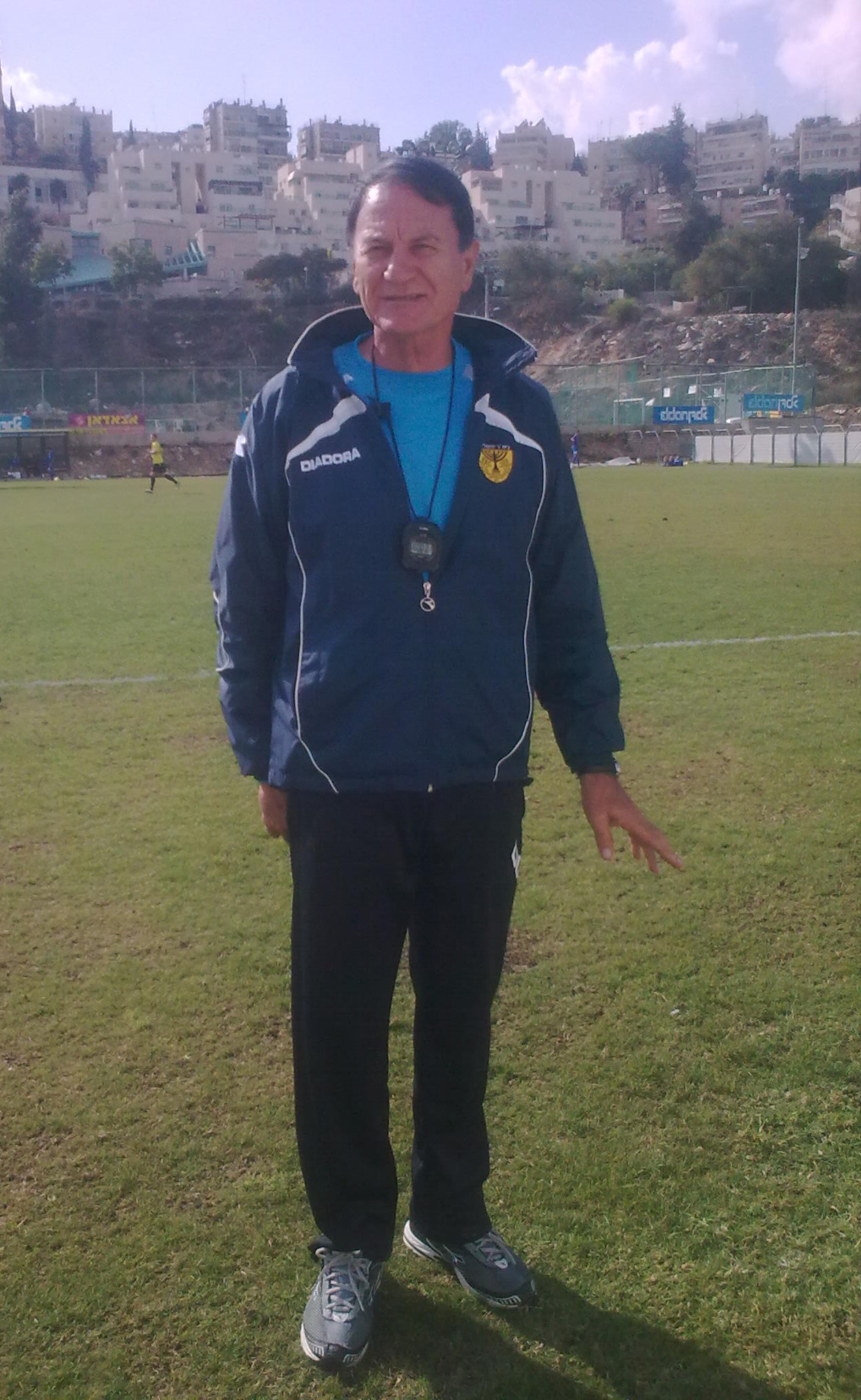

Personal information
- Full name: Eliyahu Cohen אליהו כהן
- Date of birth: 3 January 1951 (age 75)
- Place of birth: Israel
- Position: Defender

Senior career*
Years	Team	Apps	(Gls)
1968–1976	Maccabi Ramat Amidar		
1976–1986	Shimshon Tel Aviv		

Managerial career
- 1986–1990: Maccabi Ramat Amidar
- 1990–1992: Hapoel Hadera
- 1992–1994: Maccabi Herzliya
- 1994–1995: Ironi Rishon leZion
- 1995–1997: Beitar Jerusalem
- 1997–1999: Hapoel Tel Aviv
- 1999–2000: Maccabi Haifa
- 2000–2001: Hapoel Petah Tikva
- 2001–2003: Beitar Jerusalem
- 2004: Maccabi Netanya
- 2004–2005: Hapoel Be'er Sheva
- 2006–2007: Maccabi Tel Aviv
- 2007–2008: Bnei Yehuda
- 2008–2009: Ironi Kiryat Shmona
- 2012–2013: Beitar Jerusalem
- 2015: Hapoel Tel Aviv
- 2017: Beitar Jerusalem (sports director)
- 2020–: Ironi Modi'in
- * Club domestic league appearances and goals

Eli Cohen
Medal record

Representing Israel

Football

Maccabiah Games
Gold medal – first place	1977 Maccabiah	Football

Eli Cohen (Hebrew: אלי כהן), nickname: "the Sheriff" (Hebrew: השריף), born 3 January 1951) is an Israeli former football player and manager.

== Soccer career ==
Between 1968 and 1986 he was a player with Maccabi Ramat Amidar and Shimshon Tel Aviv, and earned a gold medal playing for Team Israel at the 1977 Maccabiah Games. He has managed numerous clubs, including Bnei Yehuda, Maccabi Tel Aviv, Beitar Jerusalem, Hapoel Tel Aviv, Maccabi Ramat Amidar, Hapoel Hadera, Maccabi Herzliya, Ironi Rishon leZion, Hapoel Petah Tikva, Maccabi Netanya, Hapoel Be'er Sheva, Ironi Kiryat Shmona, Ironi Modi'in, and Maccabi Haifa. He won a championship with Beitar Jerusalem in the 1996-97 season.

== Honours ==
=== As a manager ===
- Israeli Second Division (1):
  - 1992-93
- Israeli Championships (1):
  - 1996–97
- Israel State Cup (1):
  - 1999

== See also ==
- List of Maccabi Haifa F.C. managers
