= Sharon Mimer =

Israeli footballer

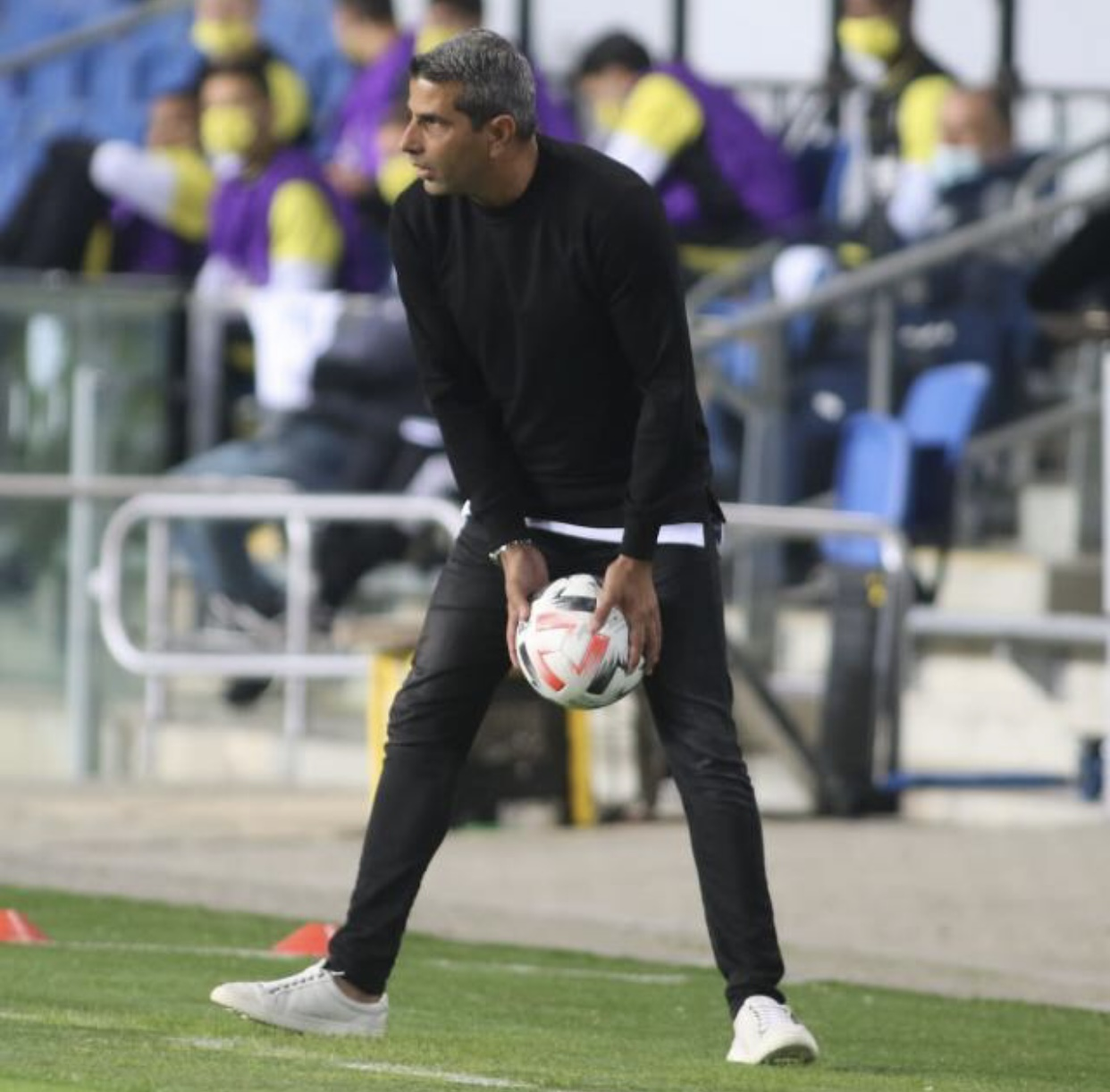
- Sharon Mimer

Personal information
- Full name: Sharon Mimer
- Date of birth: 6 September 1973 (age 53)
- Place of birth: Bat Yam, Israel
- Position: Midfielder

Youth career
- 1981–1991: Hapoel Tel Aviv

Senior career*
Years	Team	Apps	(Gls)
1991–1993	Hapoel Azor		
1993–1997	Hapoel Tel Aviv		
1997–1998	Hapoel Kfar Saba	22	(2)
1998–2000	Hapoel Ashkelon		
2000	Hapoel Bat Yam		
2000–2001	Hapoel Nazareth Illit		
2001–2003	Maccabi Kiryat Gat		
2003–2006	Hapoel Rishon LeZion		
2006–2008	Beitar Shimshon Tel Aviv	56	(4)
2008–2010	Hapoel Marmorek	30	(2)
2010–2011	Hapoel Bnei Lod	29	(0)

Managerial career
- 2012–2013: Hapoel Rishon LeZion (assistant manager)
- 2013–2015: Hapoel Rishon LeZion
- 2015: Hapoel Be'er Sheva (assistant manager)
- 2016–2017: Hapoel Kfar Saba
- 2017: Beitar Jerusalem
- 2017–2018: Maccabi Petah Tikva
- 2018–2019: Hapoel Haifa
- 2019–2020: Hapoel Hadera
- 2021–2022: Bnei Sakhnin
- 2022–2025: Maccabi Bnei Reineh
- 2025–2026: Bnei Sakhnin
- * Club domestic league appearances and goals

Sharon Mimer (Hebrew: שרון מימר; born 6 September 1973) is an Israeli former association football player.

== Career ==
=== Playing career ===
Mimer was brought up through the ranks of Hapoel Tel Aviv youth teams. During his army service, Mimer played in Hapoel Azor in Liga Bet, before returning to Hapoel Tel Aviv, where he played until 1997. Later, Mimer played in Hapoel Kfar Saba in the top division before moving to play in lower divisions until his retirement.

=== Management career ===
Mimer started his coaching career as an assistant manager to Nissan Yehezkel in Hapoel Rishon LeZion, where he also served as coach of the club's youth team. In 2013, Mimer, took over as the club's head coach after the previous coach, Eyal Lahman, was fired. Mimer saved the club from relegation and remained at the post the following season. At the beginning of the 2015–16 season, Mimer was appointed assistant coach at Hapoel Be'er Sheva. In January 2016, Mimer replaced Felix Naim as head coach of Hapoel Kfar Saba. Mimer was fired on 23 January 2017. On 6 February 2017, Mimer became the manager of Beitar Jerusalem. On August 16 of that year, Mimer was fired.
