= Barak Bakhar =

Israeli football manager (born 1979)

Barak Bachar
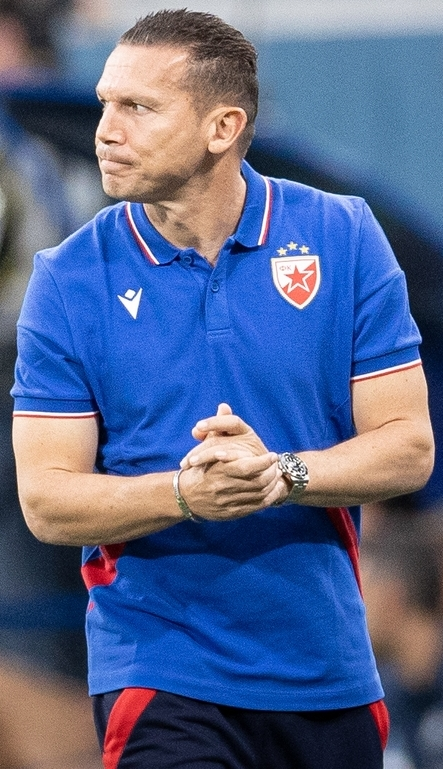
- Bakhar with Red Star Belgrade in 2023

Personal information
- Date of birth: 21 September 1979 (age 47)
- Place of birth: Tzrufa, Israel
- Height: 1.70 m (5 ft 7 in)
- Position: Right-back

Youth career
- Neve Yosef

Senior career*
Years	Team	Apps	(Gls)
1998–2002	Hakoah Ramat Gan		
2002–2004	Hapoel Petah Tikva	50	(0)
2004–2011	Ironi Kiryat Shmona	156	(2)

Managerial career
- 2011–2012: Ironi Kiryat Shmona (assistant)
- 2012–2015: Ironi Kiryat Shmona
- 2015–2020: Hapoel Be'er Sheva
- 2020–2023: Maccabi Haifa
- 2023: Red Star Belgrade
- 2024–2025: Maccabi Haifa
- 2025–2026: Maccabi Haifa
- * Club domestic league appearances and goals

Barak Bakhar (Hebrew: ברק בכר; born 21 September 1979) is an Israeli former player and the current manager .

== Early and personal life ==
Bakhar was born in moshav Tzrufa, Israel, to a Turkish-born father of both Sephardi Jewish and Mizrahi Jewish descent, and to an Israeli-born mother of Ashkenazi Jewish (Polish-Jewish) descent. His uncle was the Israeli Minister of Tourism Rehavam "Gandhi" Ze'evi.

Bakhar is married, has three children, and resides in Holon, Israel.

== Playing career ==
After going through the ranks of the youth system of Neve Yosef, Bakhar transferred to Liga Artzit side, Hakoah Ramat Gan. After four seasons in the second tier of Israeli football, he made the jump to Hapoel Petah Tikva.

In 2004, Bakhar joined Liga Leumit side, Ironi Kiryat Shmona. He established himself in the starting line up on the right side of their defense and helped them gain promotion to Israeli Premier League, the highest tier of Israeli football. During the 2007–08 season, Bakhar played all but one league match for Kiryat Shmona, due to yellow card accumulation.

In October 2008, Bakhar was called up by national team manager, Dror Kashtan for the FIFA World Cup qualification matches against Luxembourg and Latvia. His call up was canceled though, being that he never completed his service in the IDF, a requirement of all Jewish players in order to represent Israel on the national side, and Eyal Meshumar was called up in his place.

Bakhar cited that the IDF did not suit him as to why he did not complete his service. He told Israeli Yedioth Ahronoth, "they wanted to send me to a combat unit in the armor corps." Additionally, Sport 5 pointed out that Bakhar was not match fit and was expected to undergo surgery soon. This in turn embarrassed the Israel Football Association that they had missed all these items before announcing the pool of players called in for the qualification matches

== Managerial career ==
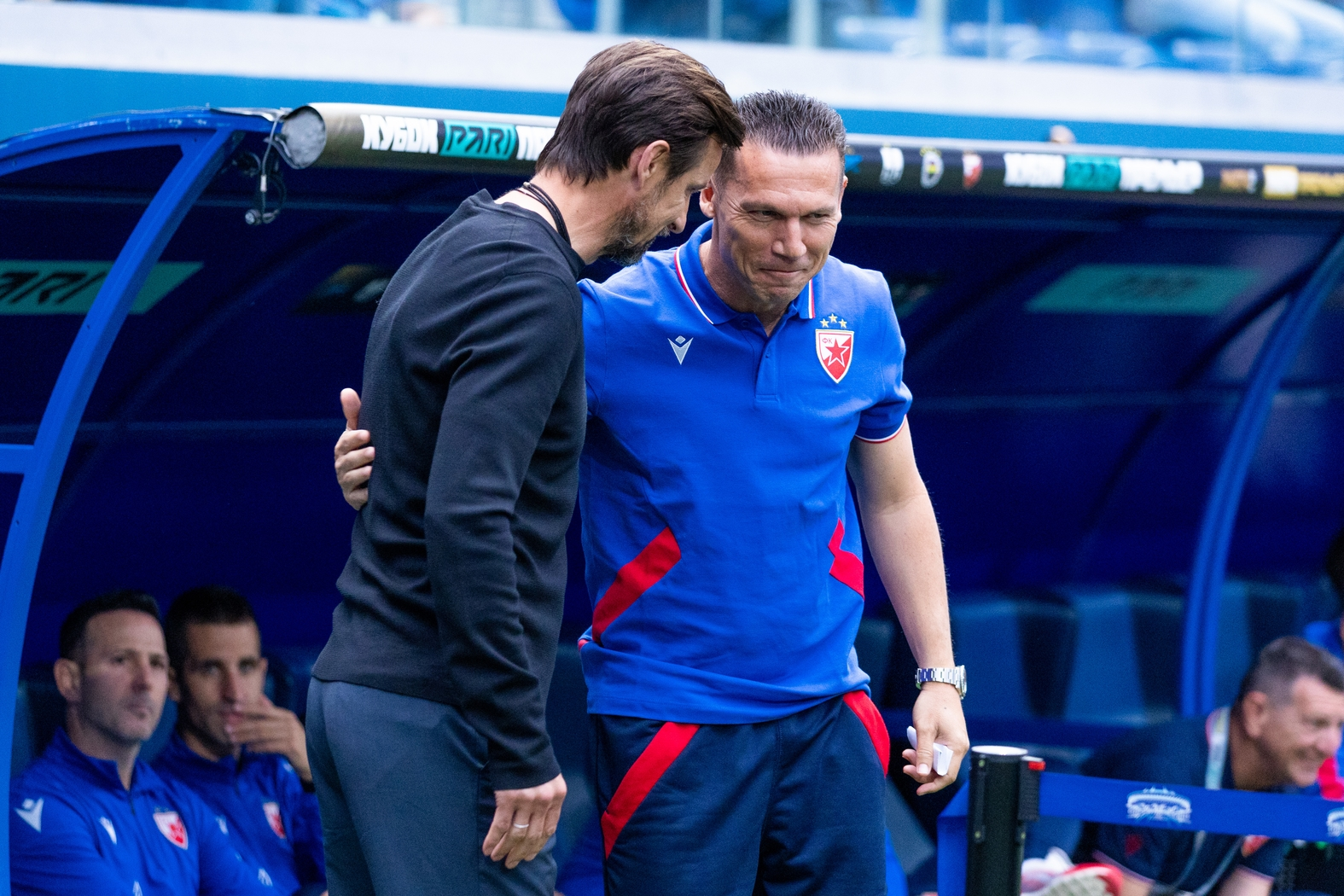
Bakhar managing Red Star Belgrade in 2023

On 3 October 2012, Bakhar was appointed manager of Hapoel Ironi Kiryat Shmona. On 14 May 2015, he ended his contract. In the 2015–16 season, he was appointed of manager of Hapoel Be'er Sheva. He got Be'er Sheva to win the Israeli League for the first time in forty years after a 3–1 win against Bnei Sachnin. By winning the league, Be'er Sheva got in the UEFA Champions League for the first time and will start in the second qualifying round. He got Be'er Sheva into the third qualifying round of 2016–17 UEFA Champions League in a 3–2 win on aggregate against Sheriff Tiraspol. Then, he got Be'er Sheva secured a Europa League group stage position by stunning Greek side Olympiacos 1–0 on aggregate, the furthest they ever reached. In the playoff qualifying round of the UEFA Champions League, Badkar's Be'er Sheva lost 5–4 on aggregate to Celtic despite winning 2–0 at Turner Stadium. In the 2016–17 UEFA Europa League, Be'er Sheva made it in the round of 32 in the Europa League in second place behind Sparta Prague in Group K by getting famous results against Southampton and Inter Milan. Bakhar also won the Toto Cup for Be'er Sheva on 28 December 2016 beating his former club Hapoel Ironi Kiryat Shmona 4–1.

In 2022, Bakhar led Maccabi Haifa to the group stages of the Champions League for the first time in thirteen years after qualifying victories over Olympiakos, Apollon Limassol and former European Champions Red Star Belgrade.

In May 2023, Bakhar was appointed manager of Serbian SuperLiga side Red Star Belgrade, and was released from the team in December 2023 after derby loss to Partizan including failure to qualify to UEFA Champion League top 16.

In May 2024, he returned to Maccabi Haifa after he signed a contract for two seasons

in May 2025, Bakhar was released from Maccabi Haifa after derby loss to Hapoel.

in October 2025, Bakhar returned to Maccabi Haifa .

== Managerial statistics ==
As of 2 November 2026

Team	Nat	From	To	Record				
Team	Nat	From	To	G	W	D	L	Win %
Hapoel Ironi Kiryat Shmona	(Israel)	3 October 2012	14 May 2015	102	59	23	20	57.84
Hapoel Be'er Sheva	(Israel)	24 May 2015	6 January 2020	218	123	47	48	56.42
Maccabi Haifa	(Israel)	8 July 2020	30 June 2023	151	98	20	33	64.90
Red Star Belgrade	(Serbia)	29 May 2023	20 December 2023	28	18	2	8	64.29
Maccabi Haifa	(Israel)	6 June 2024	4 May 2025	40	21	9	10	52.50
Maccabi Haifa	(Israel)	21 October 2025	Present	47	24	7	16	51.06
Total				548	327	104	117	59.67

== Honours ==
=== Player ===
Hakoah Maccabi Ramat Gan

- Israel Toto Cup Artzit: 1998–99

Ironi Kiryat Shmona

- Israeli Liga Leumit: 2006–07
- Israel Toto Cup Leumit: 2006–07
- Israel Toto Cup Al: 2010–11

=== Manager ===
Ironi Kiryat Shmona

- Israel State Cup: 2014

Hapoel Be'er Sheva

- Israeli Premier League: 2015–16, 2016–17, 2017–18
- Israel Super Cup: 2016, 2017

Maccabi Haifa

- Israeli Premier League: 2020–21, 2021–22, 2022–23
- Israel Super Cup: 2021
- Israel Toto Cup: 2021–22

== See also ==
- List of Jewish footballers
- Football in Israel#Title Holders
- List of Jews in sports
- List of Jews in sports (non-players)
- List of Israelis
