= Hapoel Ironi Kiryat Shmona F.C. =

Association football club in Israel

Ironi Kiryat Shmona
- Full name: Hapoel Ironi Kiryat Shmona Football Club
- Nickname: הקריה (The city)
- Founded: 2000; 26 years ago
- Ground: Municipal Stadium, Kiryat Shmona
- Capacity: 5,300
- Chairman: Izzy Sheratzky
- Manager: Shay Barda
- League: Israeli Premier League
- 2025–26: Israeli Premier League, 8th of 14
- Website: iturank8.co.il
| Home colours | Away colours | Third colours |

Hapoel Ironi Kiryat Shmona Football Club (Hebrew: מועדון כדורגל הפועל עירוני קרית שמונה) known as Ironi Kiryat Shmona is a professional football club based in Kiryat Shmona, in the northern district of Israel. The club is a current member of the Israeli Premier League, and plays at the Ironi Stadium. They won their first league title in 2011–12.

The Roaring Lion statue on the team's logo is a well-known monument. It commemorates the casualties of the Tel Hai battle that happened north of Kiryat Shmona on March 1, 1920.

== History ==
A chart showing the progress of Ironi Kiryat Shmona through the Israeli football league system, from 2000–01 to the present

The club was founded in 2000 by a merger of Hapoel Kiryat Shmona of Liga Alef and Maccabi Kiryat Shmona of Liga Bet, and took Hapoel Kiryat Shmona's place in Liga Alef, as well as playing at Hapoel's stadium. The merger was initiated by businessman Izzy Sheratzky owner of Ituran Location and Control, who are the official sponsors of the team.

In the new club's first season they won the North Division of Liga Alef and were promoted to Liga Artzit. In 2002–03 they finished as runners-up to Hakoah Ramat Gan and were promoted to Liga Leumit. In their first season at the second level they narrowly missed out on promotion, only finishing below runners-up Hapoel Nazareth Illit on goal difference. They finished third again in 2005–06, but won the league in 2006–07 to earn a promotion to the Israeli Premier League, the first time a club from the town had played in the top division. In the same season they also won the Liga Leumit Toto Cup.

The club's first season in the Premier League saw them finish third and qualify for the UEFA Cup. In their first season in Europe, home matches had to be played at the Kiryat Eliezer Stadium in Haifa. After knocking out FK Mogren, they lost to Litex Lovech in the second qualifying round.

In 2008–09, the club finished bottom of the Premier League and were relegated to Liga Leumit. However, the following season they won the division and were promoted back to the Premier League.

On 15 December 2009, Ironi Kiryat Shmona won the 2009–10 Toto Cup Leumit.

On 19 January 2011, Ironi Kiryat Shmona won the 2010–11 Toto Cup Al, a year after winning the Leumit version of the cup, it was their first major title. In addition, Ironi Kiryat Shmona became the first team to win both first and second Toto Cup trophy in a back-to-back year.

On 24 January 2012, Ironi Kiryat Shmona defended their Toto Cup Al by beating Hapoel Tel Aviv in the 2011–12 Toto Cup Al finals.

On 2 April 2012, Ironi Kiryat Shmona won the Israeli Premier League and became the 14th Israeli champions. They won the league after finishing their match against the runner-up Hapoel Tel Aviv. in a goalless draw, having five more rounds left for that season. Their championship was the first to be won by a team outside the three major cities (Tel Aviv, Jerusalem and Haifa) for almost 30 years.

On 20 May 2012, The club changed its badge due to UEFA sponsorship rules which forbids the use of a sponsor name in both the kit and team badge. The new badge includes a number of footballs including a big one which used in the former badge, the Lion of Judah statue from the Battle of Tel Hai and a gold star to mark the only team championship.

In 2020, the club were on the verge of relegation to the Liga Leumit, trailing three points behind the 12th placed team (safe from relegation) with one match to go, but managed to stay in the Israeli Premier league and finished 12th thanks to goal difference.

In the start of the 2022-23 season, Menahem Koretzky was assigned as the team's manager. On 21 December 2022, Koretzky left the club and instead of him Nir Berkovic was appointed as manager. On 11 February 2023, Berković was sacked and a few days later Slobodan Drapić was assigned as manager. After a long struggle in the Israeli Premier league, On 6 May 2023, the club eventually relegated from the Israeli Premier league to the Liga Leumit after 13 years in the Israeli Premier league. On 16 May Shay Barda was appointed as manager.

== European record ==
| Season | Competition | Round | Opponent | 1st leg | 2nd leg | Aggregate |
|---|---|---|---|---|---|---|
| 2008–09 | UEFA Cup | Q1 | (Montenegro) Mogren | 1–1 | 3–0 | 4–1 |
| 2008–09 | UEFA Cup | Q2 | (Bulgaria) Litex Lovech | 0–0 | 1–2 | 1–2 |
| 2012–13 | Champions League | Q2 | (Slovakia) MŠK Žilina | 0–1 | 2–0 | 2–1 |
| 2012–13 | Champions League | Q3 | (Azerbaijan) Neftchi Baku | 4–0 | 2–2 | 6–2 |
| 2012–13 | Champions League | PO | (Belarus) BATE Borisov | 0–2 | 1–1 | 1–3 |
| 2012–13 | Europa League | Group stage | (France) Lyon | 3–4 | 0–2 | 4th |
| 2012–13 | Europa League | Group stage | (Spain) Athletic Bilbao | 1–1 | 0–2 | 4th |
| 2012–13 | Europa League | Group stage | (Czech Republic) Sparta Prague | 1–3 | 1–1 | 4th |
| 2014–15 | Europa League | Q3 | (Russia) Dynamo Moscow | 1–1 | 1–2 | 2–3 |
| 2015–16 | Europa League | Q3 | (Czech Republic) Slovan Liberec | 1–2 | 0–3 | 1–5 |

== Current squad ==
As of 25 August 2026

| No. | Pos. | Nation | Player |
|---|---|---|---|
| 1 | GK | SRB | Nikola Đurković |
| 4 | DF | ISR | Amit Glazer |
| 6 | DF | ISR | Ofir Benbenisti |
| 7 | FW | SEN | Amadou Sagna |
| 8 | MF | BRA | Talles Costa |
| 10 | MF | ISR | Ariel Sheratzky |
| 11 | DF | ISR | Shay Sabah |
| 12 | FW | ISR | Joan Halabi |
| 14 | DF | ISR | Harel Goldenberg |
| 15 | MF | ISR | Yoav Karadi |
| 16 | MF | ISR | Mor Siman Tov |
| 17 | DF | ISR | Itzik Shoolmayster |
| 18 | FW | ISR | Ori Shnaper |
| 19 | GK | BRA | Daniel Tenenbaum |

| No. | Pos. | Nation | Player |
|---|---|---|---|
| 20 | DF | ISR | Ovadia Darwish |
| 21 | MF | AZE | Rufat Abdullazade (on loan from Varaždin) |
| 24 | MF | ISR | Nadav Markovich (on loan from Beitar Jerusalem) |
| 26 | DF | SRB | Nemanja Ljubisavljević |
| 28 | DF | ISR | Ido Vaier |
| 29 | MF | ISR | Yehonathan Malka |
| 30 | FW | ISR | Awajo Asefa |
| 32 | DF | ISR | Shay Ben David |
| 39 | FW | ISR | Niv Gabay (on loan from Maccabi Haifa) |
| 44 | DF | ISR | Shon Edri |
| 63 | MF | ANG | Alex Sola (on loan from Estrela da Amadora) |
| — | FW | ROU | Alexandru Pop |

=== Out on loan ===
| No. | Pos. | Nation | Player |

=== Foreigners for 2025–26 season ===
Only up to six non-Israeli nationals can be in an Israeli club squad. Those with Jewish ancestry, married to an Israeli, or have played in Israel for an extended period of time, can claim a passport or permanent residency which would allow them to play with Israeli status.

- (Guinea) Sékou Tidiany Bangoura
- (Panama) Cristian Martínez
- (Peru) Adrián Ugarriza
- (Serbia) Nemanja Ljubisavljević

== Former players ==
- (Bolivia) Luis Alberto Gutiérrez
- (Democratic Republic of the Congo) Yves Yuvuladio
- (Chad) Ezechiel N'Douassel
- (Israel) Ahmed Abed
- (Israel) Shimon Abuhatzira
- (Israel) Danny Amos
- (Israel) Barak Badash
- (Israel) Barak Bakhar
- (Israel) Benny Ben Zaken
- (Israel) Shavit Elimelech
- (Israel) Elad Gabai
- (Israel) Guy Haimov
- (Israel) Roi Kahat
- (Israel) Adrian Rochet
- (Israel) Abbas Suan
- (Israel) Guy Tzarfati
- (Israel) Shir Tzedek
- (Israel) Eitan Tibi
- (Israel) Sean Weissman
- (Moldova) Radu Gînsari
- (Trinidad and Tobago) Levi García
- (United States) Kenny Saief
- Yuval Spungin (born 1987), Israeli footballer
- Nicolás Valansi (born 1979), Argentine-Israeli footballer

== Club staff ==
| Position | Staff |
|---|---|
| Manager | (Israel) Shay Barda |
| Assistant Manager | (Israel) Ya'akov Cohen |
| First-Team Coach | (Israel) Itay Spielman |
| Goalkeeper Coaches | (Israel) Samion Rahman |
| Fitness Coaches | (Israel) David Bublil |
| Analyst | (Israel) Alon Cohen |
| Masseur | (Israel) Hod Hanuna |
| Physiotherapist | (Israel) Itzhak Gueta |
| Steward | (Israel) Ilan Glazer |

== Managers ==
- (Israel) Benny Tabak (July 2001 – May 2)
- (Israel) Ran Ben Shimon (July 2006 – April 8)
- (Israel) Eli Cohen (16 December 2008 – 16 April 2009)
- (Israel) Ran Ben Shimon (16 April 2009 – 13 May 2012)
- (Israel) Gili Landau (13 May 2012 – 3 October 2012)
- (Israel) Barak Bakhar (3 October 2012 – 14 May 2015)
- (Israel) Salah Hasarma (May 2015 – February 2016)
- (Israel) Shlomi Dora (February 2016 – May 2016)
- (Israel) Motti Ivanir (May 2016 – October 2016)
- (Israel) Benny Ben Zaken (October 2016 – November 2016)
- (Israel) Tomer Kashtan (November 2016 – May 2017)
- (Israel) Haim Silvas (May 2017 – December 2018)
- (Israel) Tomer Kashtan (December 2018 – May 2019)
- (Israel) Shimon Edri (May 2019)
- (Israel) Messay Dego (May 2019 – October 2019)

== Titles ==
- Israeli Premier League
  - Winners (1): 2011–12
- Israel State Cup
  - Winners (1): 2013–14
- Toto Cup
  - Winners (2): 2010–11, 2011–12
- Israel Super Cup
  - Winners (1): 2015
