= Kiryat Shmona Municipal Stadium =

Football stadium in Kiryat Shmona, Israel

Coordinates: 33°12′29.0″N 35°34′32.5″E

- Kiryat Shmona Stadium אצטדיון קריית שמונה
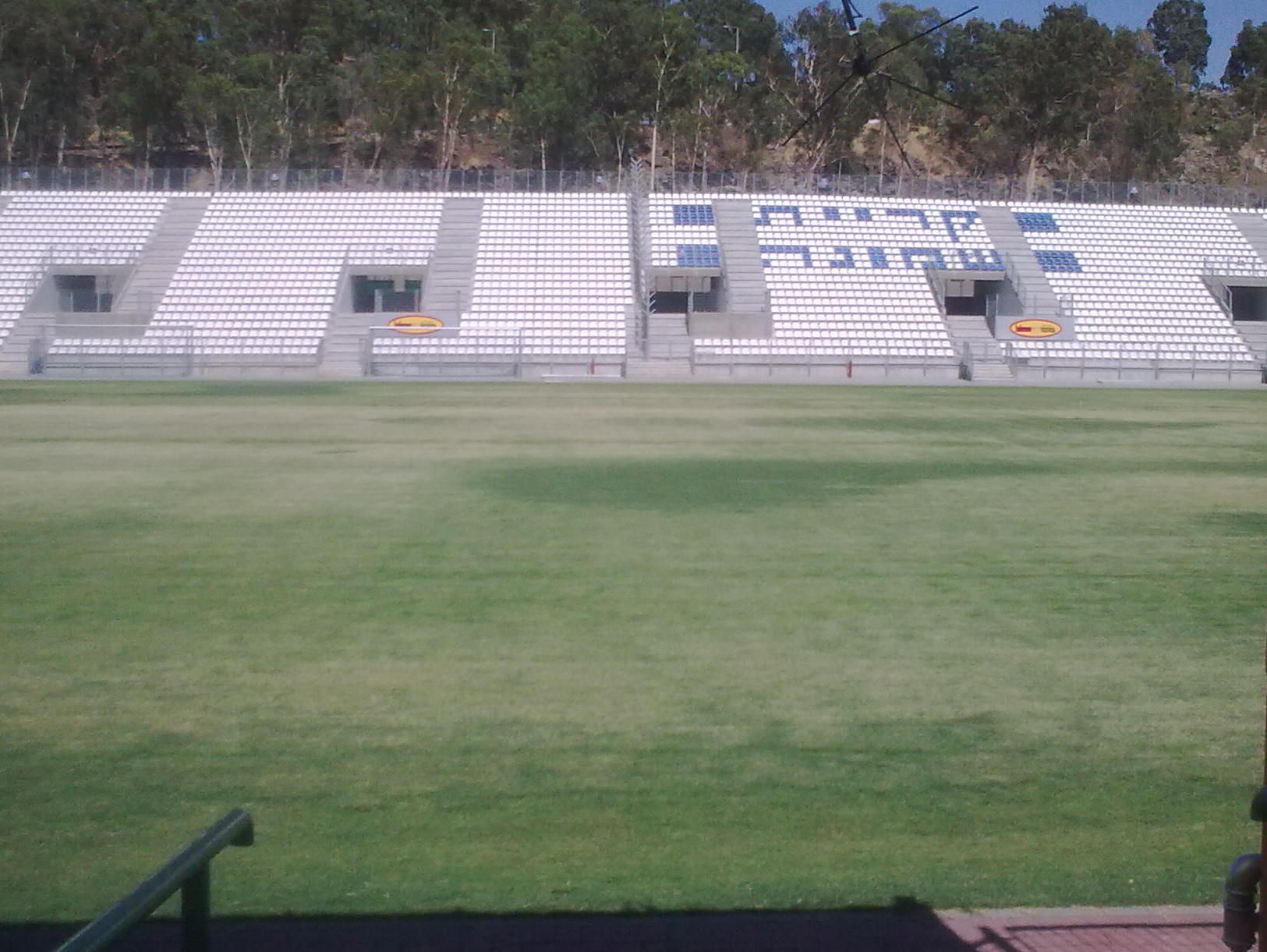
- Interactive map of Kiryat Shmona Municipal Stadium
- Location: Kiryat Shmona, Israel
- Owner: Kiryat Shmona Municipality
- Operator: Kiryat Shmona Municipality
- Capacity: 5,300
- Surface: Grass

Construction
- Opened: 1989
- Expanded: 2008

Tenant
- Hapoel Ironi Kiryat Shmona (1989-present)

Kiryat Shmona Municipal Stadium is a football stadium in Kiryat Shmona in northern Israel. It is home to Hapoel Ironi Kiryat Shmona.

== History ==
Opened in 1989, the stadium has undergone extensive renovations as the club has climbed from the regional leagues to the Premier League. New plastic seats replaced concrete ones, the pitch was relaid, broadcast facilities built and floodlights erected.
