= Nir Berkovic =

Israeli footballer

Nir Berkovic 'ניר ברקוביץ
Personal information
- Date of birth: 16 November 1982 (age 44)
- Place of birth: Regba, Israel
- Position: Midfielder

Team information
- Current team: Hapoel Umm al-Fahm (manager)

Youth career
- Maccabi Haifa
- 1998–1999: Arsenal
- 1999–2001: Maccabi Haifa

Senior career*
Years	Team	Apps	(Gls)
2001–2003	Hapoel Rishon LeZion	–	(–)
2003–2004	Hapoel Haifa	–	(–)
2004	Maccabi Ahi Nazareth	1	(0)
2004–2006	Hapoel Ra'anana	–	(–)
2006	Maccabi Netanya	0	(0)

Managerial career
- 2008–2015: Ironi Nesher (youth)
- 2015–2016: Hapoel Rishon LeZion (U-20)
- 2016–2018: Hapoel Rishon LeZion
- 2018–2019: Hapoel Ramat Gan
- 2019: Hapoel Rishon LeZion
- 2019–2020: Hapoel Umm al-Fahm
- 2020: Maccabi Ahi Nazareth
- 2020: Bnei Yehuda
- 2021: Hapoel Umm al-Fahm
- 2021–2022: Sektzia Ness Ziona
- 2022–2023: Ironi Kiryat Shmona
- 2023: Hapoel Umm al-Fahm
- * Club domestic league appearances and goals

Nir Berkovic (Hebrew: ניר ברקוביץ'; born 16 November 1982) is an Israeli football coach and a former player who is the head coach of Hapoel Umm al-Fahm. He is the younger brother of former Manchester City player Eyal Berkovic.

== Life and career ==
Berkovic born in Regba, Israel, and when he was 2 years old, his family moved to the city of Nahariya. He started his career with Maccabi Haifa. At age 16, following disputes at Haifa, he was signed on a two-year contract as a youth player for English club Arsenal in December 1998. He spent four months at Arsenal, but could not obtain a work permit in England.
