= Haim Silvas =

Israeli footballer and manager

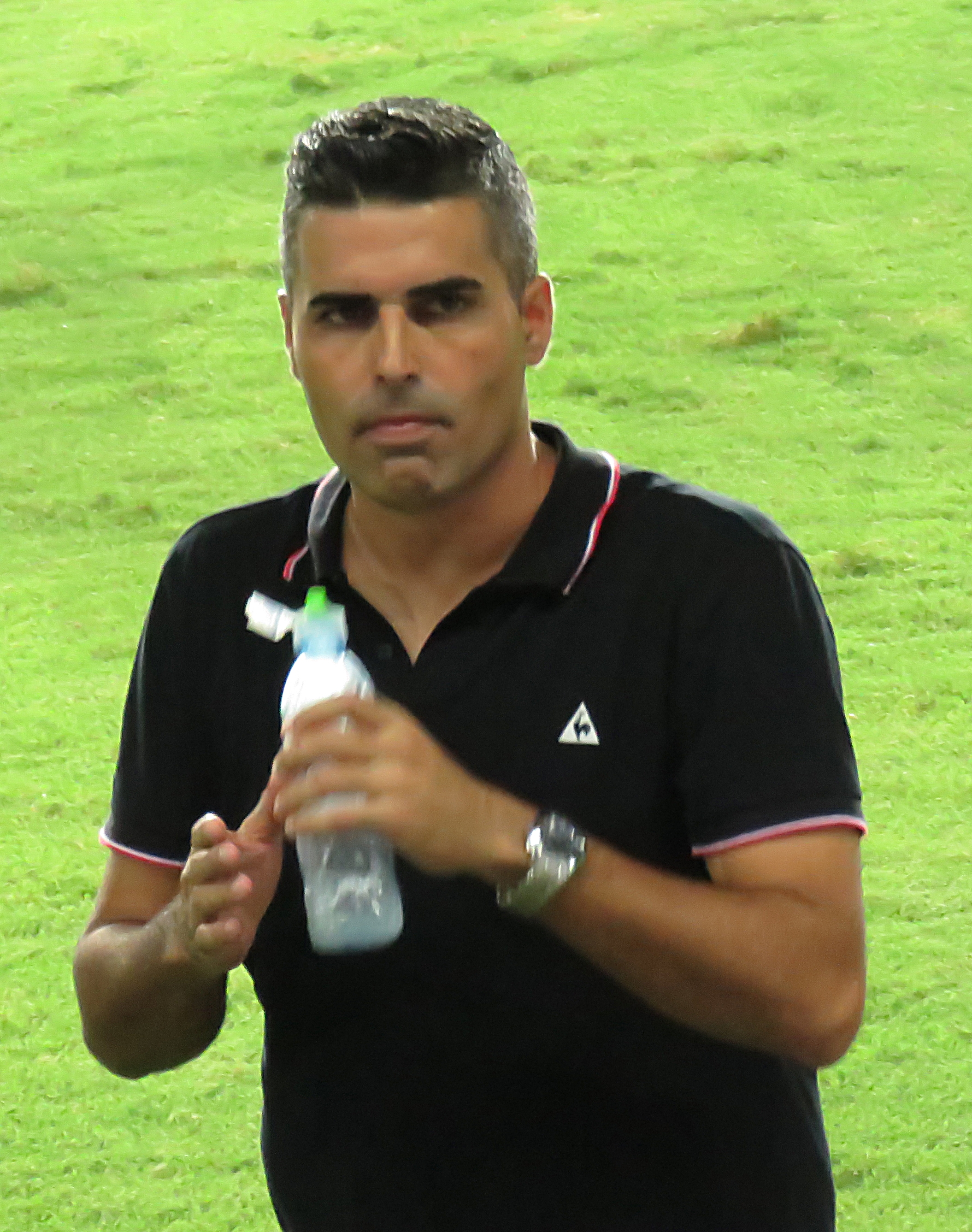

Personal information
- Full name: Haim Silvas
- Date of birth: November 21, 1975 (age 50)
- Place of birth: Haifa, Israel
- Position: Midfielder

Team information
- Current team: Hapoel Haifa (coach)

Youth career
- Maccabi Haifa

Senior career*
Years	Team	Apps	(Gls)
1994–2001	Maccabi Haifa	79	(8)
1997–1998	→ Maccabi Petah Tikva (loan)	14	(1)
1999–2000	→ Beitar Jerusalem (loan)	2	(0)
2000–2001	→ Bnei Yehuda (loan)	27	(0)
2001–2002	Hapoel Kfar Saba		
2002–2003	Maccabi Ahi Nazareth		
2003–2004	Ironi Kiryat Shmona	2	(0)
2004–2005	Maccabi Ahi Nazareth	28	(5)
2005	Hapoel Acre		
2005–2006	Hapoel Be'er Sheva		
2006	Hapoel Acre	13	(2)
2007	Hapoel Bnei Tamra	18	(2)
2007–2009	Maccabi Ahi Nazareth	59	(6)
2009–2010	Ahva Arraba	31	(3)
2010–2012	Hapoel Afula	18	(5)

International career
1998	Israel	3	(0)

Managerial career
- 2011: Hapoel Afula (player-manager)
- 2012–2014: Hapoel Ra'anana (assistant manager)
- 2014–2017: Hapoel Ra'anana
- 2017–2018: Ironi Kiryat Shmona
- 2019–2021: Hapoel Haifa
- 2022: Bnei Sakhnin
- 2023: Hapoel Tel Aviv
- 2024: Hapoel Hadera
- 2025–2026: F.C. Ashdod
- 2026–: Hapoel Haifa
- * Club domestic league appearances and goals

Haim Silvas (Hebrew: חיים סילבס; born November 21, 1975) is a retired Israeli soccer player. He is best known for his years at Maccabi Haifa, where he scored a historic goal against European regional power, AFC Ajax.

== Early life ==
Silwas was born and raised in Haifa, Israel, to an Israeli family of Greek Jewish descent.

== Honours ==
- Israel State Cup (1):
  - 1995
- Liga Leumit (2):
  - 2001-02, 2002-03

== See also ==
- List of Jewish footballers
- List of Jews in sports
- List of Jews in sports (non-players)
- List of Israelis
