= Meni Koretski =

Israeli footballer and manager

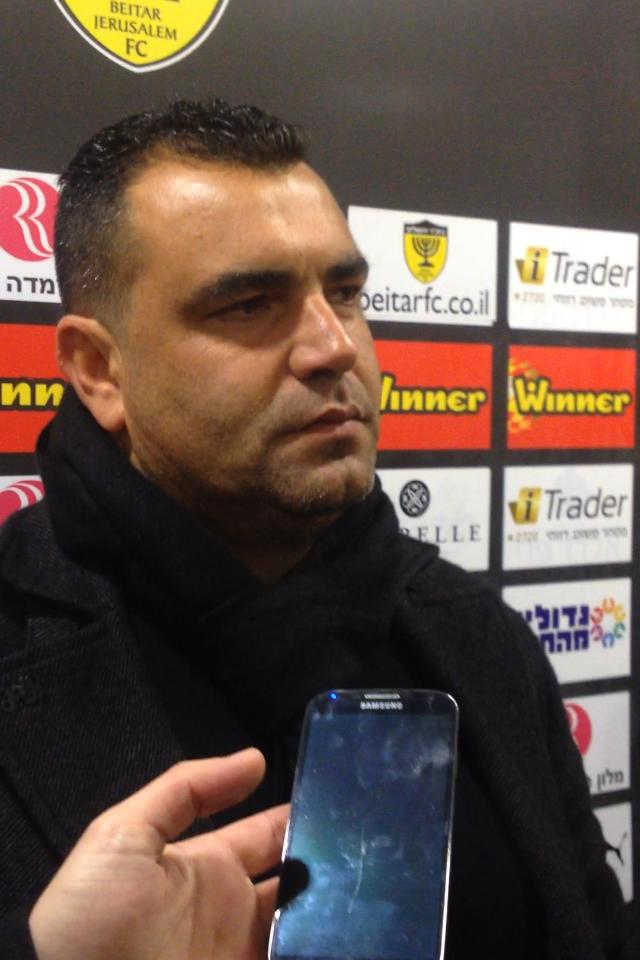

Personal information
- Full name: Menahem Koretski
- Date of birth: 4 April 1974 (age 52)
- Place of birth: Ramat HaSharon, Israel
- Position: Goalkeeper

Team information
- Current team: Israel Women (coach)

Youth career
- Shimshon Tel Aviv

Senior career*
Years	Team	Apps	(Gls)
1991–1994	Shimshon Tel Aviv		
1994–2000	Beitar Tel Aviv		
2000–2002	Maccabi Netanya	15	(0)
2002–2004	Bnei Yehuda	0	(0)
2004–2010	Ironi Nir Ramat HaSharon	144	(0)

Managerial career
- 2011: Ironi Nir Ramat HaSharon (caretaker)
- 2012: Ironi Nir Ramat HaSharon (caretaker)
- 2012–2013: Ironi Nir Ramat HaSharon (joint with Benny Tabak)
- 2013–2014: Hapoel Ra'anana
- 2014–2015: Beitar Jerusalem
- 2015–2016: Hapoel Petah Tikva
- 2016: Maccabi Netanya
- 2016: Ironi Nir Ramat HaSharon
- 2017: Hapoel Tel Aviv
- 2017–2019: Hapoel Ra'anana
- 2020: Hapoel Rishon LeZion
- 2021–2022: Hapoel Hadera
- 2022: Ironi Kiryat Shmona
- 2023: Hapoel Hadera
- 2024: Hapoel Ramat Gan
- 2024–2025: Hapoel Acre
- 2025: Bnei Sakhnin
- 2026–: Israel Women
- * Club domestic league appearances and goals

Menahem Koretski (Hebrew: מני קורצקי; born 4 April 1974) is an Israeli football manager and former players.

== Club career ==
Koretski began his playing career as a goalkeeper in the youth setup of Shimshon Tel Aviv, and later transferred to Beitar Tel Aviv. In 2000, Koretski moved to Maccabi Netanya and played as a second goalkeeper. He was also the second goalkeeper in Bnei Yehuda. In 2004, Koretski moved to Ironi Nir Ramat Hasharon, and for the first time in his career he got an active role and became the captain and the first goalkeeper of Ramat Hasharon. In 2010, he retired from professional football.

== Managerial career ==
After Koretski's retirement from football, he was appointed as a team delegate of Hapoel Ramat Hasharon, and later began serving as assistant coach. In the 2012–13 season, Koretski was appointed as head coach in joint with Benny Tabak. They both led the team to a very good performance. Few weeks before the end of the season, he was fired, after a conflict with some key players.

At the end of the season, Koretski was appointed as head coach of Hapoel Ra'anana and led the team to a promotion to Ligat Ha'Al. Two games before the end of the season, his team secured one more season in the Premier League.

Before the 2014–15 season, Koretski was appointed as head coach for Beitar Jerusalem, and was fired on 27 January 2015. One week later, Koretski was appointed as head coach for Hapoel Petah Tikva, and at the end of the season they were relegated to Liga Leumit. In January 2016, while Hapoel Petah Tikva were ranked first in Liga Leumit, Koretski decided to move to coach Maccabi Netanya, while Netanya entered a process of liquidation and were ranked 16th in Ligat Ha'Al. On 25 March he was fired.

In 2015–16, he returned to a second term in Hapoel Ramat Hasharon, but resigned later in November.
