= Abdul Zakaria Mugees =

Ghanaian footballer

Personal information
- Full name: Abdul Zakaria Mugees
- Date of birth: 27 December 2001 (age 24)
- Place of birth: Ghana
- Height: 1.74 m (5 ft 8 1/2 in)
- Position: Winger

Team information
- Current team: Odd
- Number: 22

Youth career
- Dreams
- Techiman Eleven Wonders

Senior career*
Years	Team	Apps	(Gls)
2018	Dreams	3	(0)
2019–2021	Techiman Eleven Wonders	21	(2)
2021–2023	F.C. Ashdod	40	(8)
2022	→ Hapoel Ramat Gan	12	(1)
2023–	Odd	8	(0)
- * Club domestic league appearances and goals as of 3 January 2026

Abdul Zakaria Mugees (born 27 December 2001) is a Ghanaian professional footballer who plays as a forward for Norwegian Premier League side Odds BK.

== Career ==
Mugees started his Ghana Premier League career with Dreams FC in 2018, playing two matches in the first round of the 2018 Ghanaian Premier League, before it was suspended and later cancelled due to the Anas Number 12 scandal.

Ahead of the 2019–20 Ghana Premier League season, he signed for Bono-side Techiman Eleven Wonders. On 25 January 2021, he scored his hit debut goal as he scored a second half brace in a match against Karela United that helped the Eleven Wonders win the match by 2–0. He made 13 league match appearances and scored 2 goals before the league was brought to an abrupt end due to the COVID-19 pandemic.

Joining Norwegian Odds BK in 2023, he played 6 league games in 2023, 2 in 2024 and none in 2025.
