= Slobodan Drapić =

Israeli footballer and manager

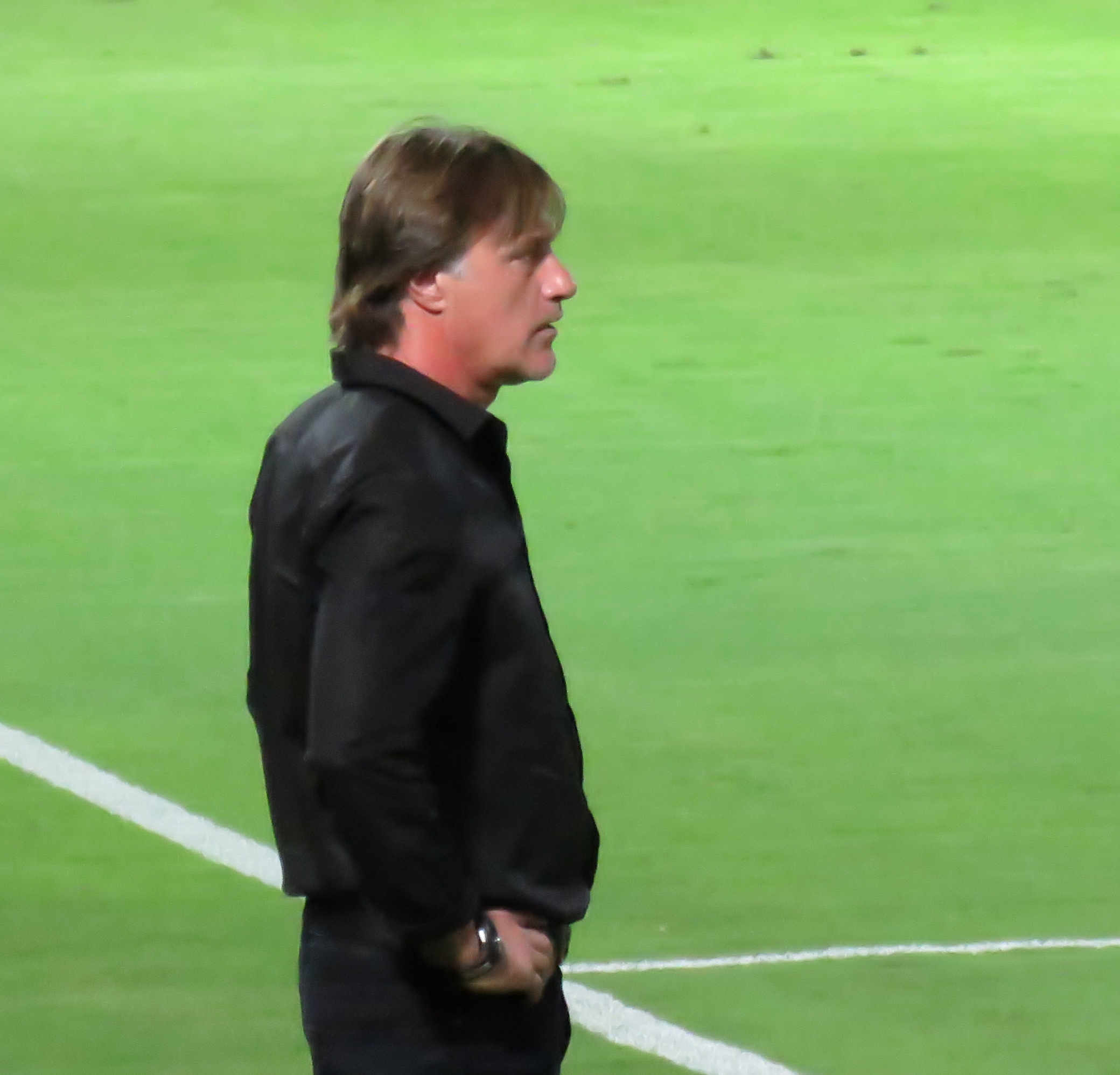
- Drapić coaching Beitar Jerusalem in 2015

Personal information
- Date of birth: 28 February 1965 (age 61)
- Place of birth: Novi Sad, SFR Yugoslavia (now Serbia)
- Position: Defender

Senior career*
| Years | Team | Apps | (Gls) |
| 1984–1986 | Novi Sad | 36 | (0) |
| 1988–1995 | Maccabi Netanya | 122 | (7) |
| 1995–1998 | Beitar Nes Tubruk | | |

International career
| 1988 | Israel | 1 | (0) |

Managerial career
- 1999–2000: Maccabi Netanya (assistant)
- 2000: Maccabi Netanya (caretaker)
- 2000–2002: Tzafririm Holon (assistant)
- 2001: Tzafririm Holon (caretaker)
- 2003–2008: Maccabi Haifa (assistant)
- 2008–2009: Hapoel Kfar Saba
- 2009–2010: Maccabi Herzliya
- 2010–2011: Bnei Sakhnin
- 2012: Partizan (assistant)
- 2013–2015: Beitar Tel Aviv Ramla
- 2015–2016: Beitar Jerusalem
- 2016–2020: Maccabi Netanya
- 2020–2021: Beitar Jerusalem
- 2021–2022: Ironi Kiryat Shmona
- 2022–2023: Hapoel Tel-Aviv
- 2023: Ironi Kiryat Shmona
- 2023–2025: Bnei Sakhnin
- 2025–: Maccabi Bnei Reineh
- * Club domestic league appearances and goals

Slobodan Drapić (Serbian Cyrillic: Слободан Драпић, Hebrew: סלובודאן דראפיץ'; born 28 February 1965) is a football manager and former player. He is currently the manager of Maccabi Bnei Reineh. Born in Yugoslavia, he represented Israel at international level.

== Playing career ==
Drapić was born and grew up in Novi Sad, where he played for the local side RFK Novi Sad for two years in the Yugoslav Second League. In 1988, he moved to play in Israel for Maccabi Netanya and made aliyah. On 23 November 1988, he was called up for the Israeli national team and won his one and only cap for the national side in a friendly game against Romania.

Drapić played with Netanya for seven years in the Liga Leumit until the club got relegated in the end of the 1994–95 season. The following season he moved to play for Beitar Tubruk, where he also retired as a player.

== Coaching career ==
In a long coaching career in Israel he became the assistant coach with Maccabi Netanya, Tzafririm Holon and Maccabi Haifa. When Ronny Levy left Maccabi Haifa, he also wanted to leave the club. Partizan Belgrade offered him a job as a scout and coach assistant, but he refused the offer because he wanted to stay in Israel.

On 27 September 2010, Drapić signed a two-year contract as manager of Bnei Sakhnin.

In the second half of the 2011–12 season he worked for Partizan as the assistant coach of Avram Grant.

In June 2013 he became the manager of Beitar Tel Aviv Ramla. He worked as the manager of the club until 7 June 2015, when he signed a contract as the manager of Beitar Jerusalem. The following season he returned to his former club of Maccabi Netanya.

== Personal life ==
Drapić is married to his Israeli wife Anita. They have four children; the youngest is Dolev, who is a professional basketball player in Barak Netanya.

== Managerial stats ==
| Team | Nat | From | To | Record | | | | |
| Team | Nat | From | To | P | W | D | L | Win % |
|---|---|---|---|---|---|---|---|---|
| Hapoel Kfar Saba | (Israel) | 26 June 2008 | 10 June 2009 | 43 | 10 | 15 | 18 | 23.26 |
| Maccabi Herzliya | (Israel) | 11 June 2009 | 1 June 2010 | 38 | 13 | 10 | 15 | 34.21 |
| Bnei Sakhnin | (Israel) | 27 September 2010 | 4 April 2011 | 28 | 5 | 6 | 17 | 17.86 |
| Beitar Tel Aviv Ramla | (Israel) | 23 June 2013 | 5 June 2015 | 81 | 24 | 27 | 30 | 29.63 |
| Beitar Jerusalem | (Israel) | 7 June 2015 | 1 June 2016 | 44 | 21 | 7 | 16 | 47.73 |
| Maccabi Netanya | (Israel) | 2 June 2016 | 3 July 2020 | 151 | 70 | 37 | 44 | 46.36 |
| Beitar Jerusalem | (Israel) | 4 September 2020 | 20 March 2021 | 26 | 8 | 8 | 10 | 30.77 |
| Ironi Kiryat Shmona | (Israel) | 9 November 2021 | 31 May 2022 | 26 | 13 | 6 | 7 | 50.00 |
| Hapoel Tel Aviv | (Israel) | 19 September 2022 | 10 January 2023 | 13 | 3 | 4 | 6 | 23.08 |
| Ironi Kiryat Shmona | (Israel) | 14 Febaury 2023 | | 10 | 2 | 6 | 2 | 20.00 |
| Total | | | | 460 | 169 | 126 | 165 | 36.74 |
