= Ran Ben-Shimon =

Israeli footballer and manager (born 1970)

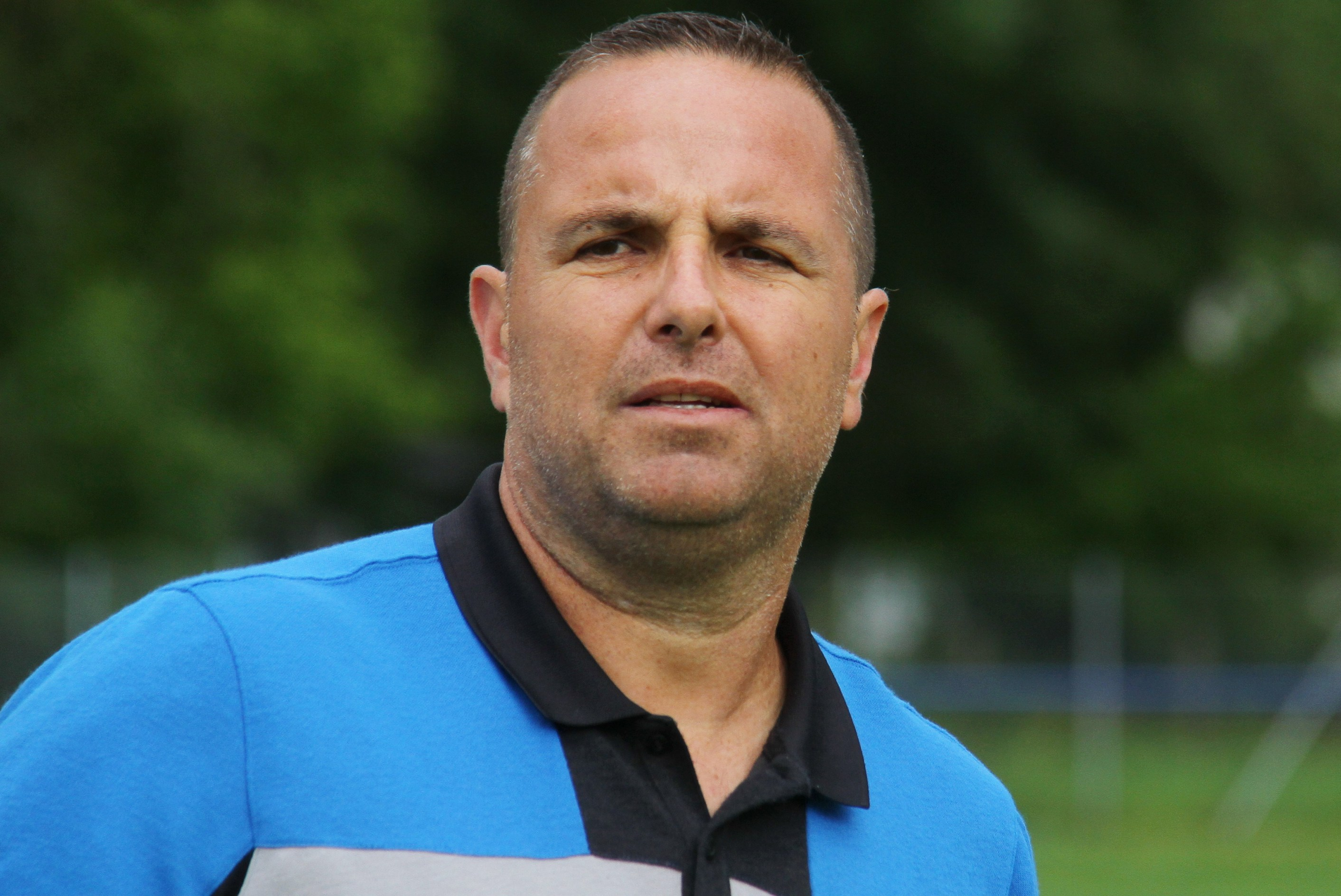
- Ben-Shimon as the manager of Beitar Jerusalem in 2016

Personal information
- Full name: Ran Ben-Shimon
- Date of birth: 28 November 1970 (age 55)
- Place of birth: Petah Tikva, Israel
- Position: Center-back

Team information
- Current team: Maccabi Haifa (manager)

Youth career
- Maccabi Petah Tikva

Senior career*
Years	Team	Apps	(Gls)
1987–1995	Maccabi Petah Tikva	170	(9)
1995–2001	Hapoel Haifa	183	(12)
2001–2002	Hapoel Petah Tikva	30	(3)
2002–2003	Bnei Yehuda Tel Aviv	21	(2)

International career
1986–1987	Israel U16	5	(1)
1990	Israel U21	1	(0)
1992–1999	Israel	34	(0)

Managerial career
- 2003–2005: Maccabi Tel Aviv (youth team)
- 2006: Hapoel Haifa
- 2006–2008: Hapoel Ironi Kiryat Shmona
- 2008: Maccabi Tel Aviv
- 2009–2012: Hapoel Ironi Kiryat Shmona
- 2012–2013: AEK Larnaca
- 2013–2014: Hapoel Tel Aviv
- 2014–2016: Maccabi Petah Tikva
- 2016–2017: Beitar Jerusalem
- 2017: F.C. Ashdod
- 2017–2019: Cyprus
- 2020–2023: F.C. Ashdod
- 2023–2024: AEK Larnaca
- 2024–2026: Israel
- 2026 -: Maccabi Haifa
- * Club domestic league appearances and goals

Ran Ben-Shimon (Hebrew: רן בן-שמעון; born 28 November 1970) is an Israeli former football player and current manager, who serves as the head coach of the Maccabi Haifa

As a footballer, he has played as a center-back.

== Early and personal life ==
Ben-Shimon was born and raised in Petah Tikva, Israel, to a Jewish family. His older brother, Asi Ben-Shimon, is also a former footballer, with whom Ben-Shimon used to play along, for Maccabi Petah Tikva.

== Club career ==
In 1987, Ben-Shimon began his professional career in Israeli club Maccabi Petah Tikva's senior side, where he played until the 1994–95 season, winning two Toto Cup Artzit trophies (the Israeli second division back then) and on his last season he won the Toto Cup Leumit (then the first division), after a 2–1 victory against Maccabi Tel Aviv, scoring the second goal for Maccabi Petah Tikva in an accurate free kick.

Avram Grant, who managed Hapoel Haifa was interested in Ben-Shimon in order the strengthening their defense. Maccabi Petah Tikva, headed by Avi Luzon were adamantly opposed. Robbie Shapira, the then president of Hapoel Haifa and Avi Luzon agreed on an arbitrator. of which stated that no amount can release the player from Petah Tikva. Haifa was hardly surprised as Luzon was the one who picked the arbitrator. In the end, after Hapoel Haifa lost 4–1 to Maccabi Tel Aviv in the Toto Cup, forcing Grant to look for defensive reinforcement, and Shapira agreed to buy Ben-Shimon for 450,000$. The amount spent was also a significant for the new era in the Israeli football, which continued to struggle against Maccabi Haifa on players such as Tal Banin and Reuven Atar, and raised the bar on prices of players and their wages significantly.

During his stint in Hapoel Haifa, Ben-Shimon became a leader among his teammates, and then the captain in the 1999 Liga Leumit championship (the Israeli 1st division back then) season guided under Eli Guttman. In 2001, he won the Toto Cup with Hapoel Haifa. Ben-Shimon also played in Hapoel Petah Tikva in the 2001–02 season and in Bnei Yehuda Tel Aviv in the 2002–03 season before retired from active football.

== International career ==
As a football player, Ben-Shimon has capped 34 senior international appearances for the Israel national team from 1992 to 1999.

== Managerial career ==
After retiring from playing, he started coaching the youth team of Maccabi Tel Aviv and then as a manager at Hapoel Haifa. Ben-Shimon did not continue after he failed in his efforts to promote the team to the Israeli Premier League.

During 2006–07 season, he coached Hapoel Ironi Kiryat Shmona and promote her from Liga Leumit to the Israeli Premier League for the first time in its history. Subsequent season, Ben-Shimon led the team to third place in the league, which gave him a ticket to the UEFA Cup.

In April 2008, following his success in Hapoel Ironi Kiryat Shmona, Maccabi Tel Aviv announced on the picking Ben-Shimon on its manager in the 2008–09 season. Before the start of the season there were great hopes in the tean, mainly due to highly purchases of players and the amount of money that was invested in the team by the owner Alex Shnaider. Nevertheless, the team did not produce good football and after just eight league rounds of which the team achieved only two victories, Maccabi Tel Aviv sacked Ben-Shimon. On 12 April 2009, Ben-Shimon returned as the manager of Hapoel Ironi Kiryat Shmona after the resignation of Eli Cohen. and help guided the team to its first cup, the Toto Cup Leumit and also guided the team in the promotion to the Israeli Premier League. He also guided the team to win the 2010–11 and the 2011–12 Toto Cup Al trophies and the 2011–12 Israeli Premier League championship.

He made a step on his managerial career outside Israel, as he was named manager of Cypriot club AEK Larnaca, in July 2012.

Ben-Shimon returned to his native Israel, to take charge of Hapoel Tel Aviv in the summer of 2013. His first official games ended in a defeat, as lost to Pandurii in the UEFA Europa League qualifiers.

He had a few more stints at few clubs in Israel and around the world including a stint back at AEK Larnaca as well as few stints in israel. His best achievement was a championship round spot with F.C Ashdod. He also had a stint in Cyprus National Team which didn’t really worked out.

From 2024 to 2026 Ran Ben-Shimon managed israel’s national football team, in 2026, during the nations league campaign, israel, managed by Ran Ben-Shimon had a disastrous campaign, finishing off in the last place of the group, alongside with Kosovo, Ireland and austria. Following israel’s poor performances in the recent campaign, Ran Ben-Shimon resigned from his managerial role.

in 2026/2027 season, Ran Ben-Shimon signed with Maccabi Haifa

== Managerial statistics ==
As of match played 17 November 2026

Managerial record by club and tenure
Team	From	To	Record				
Team	From	To	M	W	D	L	Win %
Hapoel Haifa	27 February 2006	9 July 2006	10	4	4	2	40.00
Hapoel Ironi Kiryat Shmona	18 September 2006	14 July 2008	67	32	21	14	47.76
Maccabi Tel Aviv	14 July 2008	4 November 2008	13	3	5	5	23.08
Hapoel Ironi Kiryat Shmona	16 April 2009	13 May 2012	136	69	37	30	50.74
AEK Larnaca	3 July 2012	20 May 2013	39	22	7	10	56.41
Hapoel Tel Aviv	20 May 2013	26 May 2014	41	17	12	12	41.46
Maccabi Petah Tikva	1 July 2014	29 February 2016	80	30	22	28	37.50
Beitar Jerusalem	15 June 2016	5 February 2017	34	12	14	8	35.29
F.C. Ashdod	14 February 2017	5 July 2017	12	3	6	3	25.00
Cyprus	5 July 2017	30 November 2019	24	5	4	15	20.83
F.C. Ashdod	21 January 2020	20 May 2023	140	51	28	61	36.43
AEK Larnaca	13 November 2023	14 May 2024	27	18	6	3	66.67
Israel	24 May 2024	present	26	8	7	11	30.77
Total			649	274	173	202	42.22

== Honours ==
=== As a player ===
Hapoel Haifa

- Israeli football championships (First division): 1998–99
- Israeli Toto Cup (Liga Leumit) (First division): 2000–01

Maccabi Petah Tikva

- Israeli Toto Cup (Liga Leumit) (First division): 1994–95
- Israeli Toto Cup (Liga Artzit) (Second division): 1989–90, 1990–91

=== As a manager ===
Hapoel Ironi Kiryat Shmona

- Israeli football championships (First division): 2011–12
- Israeli Liga Leumit (Second division): 2006–07, 2009–10
- Israeli Toto Cup (Ligat HaAl) (First division): 2010–11, 2011–12
- Israeli Toto Cup (Liga Leumit) (Second division): 2006–07, 2009–10

Maccabi Petah Tikva

- Israeli Toto Cup (Ligat HaAl) (First division): 2015–16

== See also ==
- List of Jewish footballers
- List of Jews in sports
- List of Jews in sports (non-players)
- List of Israelis
- List of Israeli football champions
