= List of Hapoel Tel Aviv F.C. seasons =

This is a list of seasons played by Hapoel Tel Aviv Football Club in Israeli and European football, from 1927 (when the club first started to form) to the most recent completed season. It details the club's achievements in major competitions, and the top scorers for each season. Top scorers in bold were also the top scorers in the Israeli league that season. Records of minor competitions such as the Lilian Cup are not included due to them being considered of less importance than the State Cup and the Toto Cup.

The club has won the League championship thirteen times, the State Cup fourteen times and the Toto Cup once. The club has never been out of the top two divisions of Israeli football.

== History ==
Hapoel Tel Aviv Football Club was established in 1927 in the port city of Tel Aviv. In 1928 the club won the State Cup, the first Jewish football club to win the title. In 1934 the club won the league championship, becoming the first Jewish club to win the championship. The club represented Israel in the Asian Champion Club Tournament in 1967, winning the title, and in 1970, when the club lost in the final. As Israel joined UEFA, in 1992, the club participated in UEFA tournaments, reaching the Champions League group stage in 2010–11 and the quarter-finals in the 2001–02 UEFA Cup.

== Seasons ==
Season	League									State Cup	League Cup	International (Asia/Europe)	Top goalscorer (Note: Goals in all competitions (Liga Leumit or Liga Al, State Cup, Toto Cup and European) are counted.)	
Season	Division	P	W	D	L	F	A	Pts	Pos	State Cup	League Cup	International (Asia/Europe)	Name	Goals
1927–28	–	–	–	–	–	–	–	–	–	Winners (Note: The 1928 final finished 2–0 to Hapoel Tel Aviv, but afterwards it was discovered by Eretz Israel Football Association (IFA) authorities that an ineligible player had been fielded by Hapoel. The cup was shared by Hapoel and Maccabi Hasmonean Jerusalem, the defeated finalists, first spending six months in Tel Aviv, then the same amount of time in Jerusalem.)	–	–		
1928–29	–	–	–	–	–	–	–	–	–	R2	–	–		
1929–30	–	–	–	–	–	–	–	–	–	SF	–	–		
1930–31	Pal. League (Note: The 1930–31 league season was abandoned after several weeks due to tensions between the British Mandate government and the Jewish community following the publication of the Passfield white paper.)	3	0	1	2	3	8	1	9th	–	–	–		
1931–32	Pal. League	15	11	2	2	52	13	24	2nd	SF	–	–		
1932–33	–	–	–	–	–	–	–	–	–	Final	–	–		
1933–34	Pal. League	14	14	0	0	42	6	28	1st	Winners	–	–		
1934–35	Pal. League (Note: The 1934–35 league season was stopped to allow Maccabi club to prepare for the 1935 Maccabiah Games and wasn't renewed due to disagreement between Maccabi and Hapoel)	13	10	1	2	31	11	21	1st	QF (Note: Hapoel Tel Aviv withdrew from the cup in protest over the EIFA decision to abandon the league and forfeited its quarter-final match against Hakoah Tel Aviv.)	–	–		
1935–36	Pal. League (Note: The 1935–36 league season was held from7 December 1935 to 18 December 1936.)	10	4	4	2	12	12	12	3rd	– (Note: After three matches played in the first round the competition was abandoned due to the Arab Revolt.)	–	–		
1936–37	Pal. League	10	4	4	2	12	12	12	3rd	Winners	–	–		
1937–38	Pal. League	8	5	1	2	20	9	11	2nd	Winners	–	–		
1938–39	Pal. League (Note: The 1938–39 league season was abandoned after playing one round of matches due to the Arab Revolt.)	11	9	2	0	27	9	20	1st	Winners	–	–		
1939–40	Pal. League	14	10	3	1	31	12	23	1st	SF	–	–		
1940–41	–	–	–	–	–	–	–	–	–	Final	–	–		
1941–42	Pal. League; Southern (Note: The 1941–42 league season was held in three regional divisions followed by a play-off. The league was completed during the 1942–43 season.)	26	19	2	5	87	23	40	4th	R1	–	–		
1942–43	Pal. League; Southern	26	19	2	5	87	23	40	4th	R3	–	–		
1943–44	Pal. League	21	17	3	1	76	11	37	1st	Winners (Note: The 1944 cup competitions began on 5 February 1944 and was completed during the following season, on 13 January 1945.)	–	–		
1944–45	Pal. League; Northern	10	8	2	0	28	8	18	1st	Winners	–	–		
1945–46	–	–	–	–	–	–	–	–	–	QF	–	–		
1946–47	Pal. League	26	14	6	6	55	28	34	4th	R2	–	–		
1947–48	Pal. League (Note: The 1947–48 league was abandoned due to the 1948 Arab–Israeli War.)	6	5	0	1	15	3	10	3rd	–	–	–		
1948–49	Isr. League (Note: The 1949–50 league began in May 1949 and ended on 24 June 1950.)	24	17	3	4	59	12	37	2nd	– (Note: The 1949 cup competition was delayed by appeals after the completion of the quarter-finals. After settling the appeals three further matches were played in February 1951, and the competition was abandoned.)	–	–		
1949–50	Isr. League	24	17	3	4	59	12	37	2nd	–	–	–		
1950–51	–	–	–	–	–	–	–	–	–	–	–	–		
1951–52	Alef	22	9	7	6	31	22	25	5th	SF	–	–		
1952–53	–	–	–	–	–	–	–	–	–	QF	–	–		
1953–54	Alef	22	9	7	8	35	18	25	4th	QF	–	–		
1954–55	Alef	26	12	9	5	49	23	33	3rd	QF	–	–		
1955–56	Leumit	22	12	5	5	49	29	29	3rd	–	–	–		
1956–57	Leumit	18	13	2	3	41	19	28	1st	SF	–	–		
1957–58	Leumit	22	6	8	8	29	40	20	5th	Round of 16	–	–		
1958–59	Leumit	22	6	7	9	29	32	19	7th	QF	QF	–		
1959–60	Leumit	22	10	4	8	26	23	24	6th	Winners	–	–		
1960–61	Leumit	22	14	2	6	38	20	30	2nd	Winners	–	–		
1961–62	Leumit	22	10	3	9	31	35	23	7th	QF	–	–		
1962–63	Leumit	22	9	9	4	31	16	27	2nd	R5	–	–		
1963–64	Leumit	28	12	10	6	48	34	34	4th	Round of 16	–	–		
1964–65	Leumit	30	15	6	9	48	30	36	3rd	SF	–	–		
1965–66	Leumit	30	12	14	4	36	23	38	1st	R6	–	–		
1966–67	Leumit	60	24	21	15	80	55	69	4th	Final	–	–		
1967–68	Leumit	60	24	21	15	80	55	69	4th	Round of 16	–	Winners		
1968–69	Leumit	30	19	6	5	55	21	44	1st	Round of 16	Group	–		
1969–70	Leumit	30	13	13	4	48	24	39	2nd	Round of 16	–	Final		
1970–71	Leumit	30	15	5	10	35	30	35	3rd	QF	–	–		
1971–72	Leumit	30	7	10	13	27	37	24	13th	Winners	–	–		
1972–73	Leumit	30	14	9	7	45	34	37	2nd	SF	Group	–		
1973–74	Leumit	30	7	12	11	25	24	26	14th	QF	–	–		
1974–75	Leumit	30	10	9	11	23	23	29	8th	SF	–	–		
1975–76	Leumit	34	12	11	11	28	28	35	10th	R4	Final	–		
1976–77	Leumit	30	9	14	7	38	30	32	6th	QF	–	–		
1977–78	Leumit	26	8	10	8	26	30	26	9th	R7	–	–		
1978–79	Leumit	30	9	13	8	27	30	31	6th	Round of 16	–	–		
1979–80	Leumit	30	10	16	4	28	19	36	2nd	Round of 16	–	–		
1980–81	Leumit	30	13	12	5	50	30	38	1st	Final	–	–		
1981–82	Leumit	30	9	13	8	32	25	31	6th	Final	–	–		
1982–83	Leumit	30	13	7	10	33	26	46	4th	Winners	–	–		
1983–84	Leumit	30	12	11	7	40	27	47	3rd	QF	–	–		
1984–85	Leumit	30	9	11	10	31	32	38	9th	Round of 16	Group	–		
1985–86	Leumit	30	17	8	5	52	26	59	1st	Round of 16	Group	–		
1986–87	Leumit	30	6	16	8	20	22	34	12th	Round of 16	Group	–		
1987–88	Leumit	33	19	9	5	43	23	66	1st	Final	SF	–		
1988–89	Leumit	33	8	8	17	33	51	28 (Note: Three points were deducted for violations of the Budgetary Regulations)	14th	Round of 16	Group	–		
1989–90	Artzit	30	15	10	5	47	22	55	2nd	QF	Group	–		
1990–91	Leumit	32	13	8	11	32	31	47	7th	R8	Group	–		
1991–92	Leumit	32	11	8	13	35	38	41	9th	QF	SF	–		
1992–93	Leumit	33	10	8	15	52	64	38	9th	SF	Group	–		
1993–94	Leumit	39	16	6	17	61	59	54	5th	Final	Group	–		
1994–95	Leumit	30	10	15	5	40	32	45	4th	Round of 16	Group	–		
1995–96	Leumit	30	16	6	8	47	28	54	5th	R8	Group	UEFA Cup, Prel. round		
1996–97	Leumit	30	8	9	13	29	32	33	13th	QF	Group	Intertoto Cup, Group		
1997–98	Leumit	30	21	5	4	44	16	68	2nd	QF	Group	–		
1998–99	Leumit	30	15	7	8	45	26	52	5th	Winners	Group	UEFA Cup, 2QR		
1999–2000	Premier	39	26	7	6	76	28	85	1st	Winners	R2	UEFA Cup, R1	Ronen Harazi	17
2000–01	Premier	38	21	12	5	55	29	75	2nd	SF	R2	CL, QR2	Milan Osterc, Pini Balili	9
2001–02	Premier	33	20	7	6	55	32	67	2nd	Round of 16	Winners	UEFA Cup, QF	Serghei Cleşcenco	14
2002–03	Premier	33	19	10	4	53	22	67	3rd	Round of 16	Final	UEFA Cup, R2	Ben Luz	10
2003–04	Premier	33	13	10	10	48	37	49	5th	SF	Group	UEFA Cup, R1	Ibezito Ogbonna	11
2004–05	Premier	33	10	9	14	30	34	39	9th	Round of 16	QF	–	Ibezito Ogbonna	7
2005–06	Premier	33	16	11	6	51	25	59	2nd	Winners	SF	–	Ilya Yavruyan	8
2006–07	Premier	33	15	9	9	53	40	54	4th	Winners	Group	UEFA Cup, Round of 32	Elyaniv Barda	10
2007–08	Premier	33	12	5	16	35	40	41	7th	Final	Group	UEFA Cup, Group	Fabio Junior	7
2008–09	Premier	33	17	10	6	49	28	61	2nd	Round of 16	SF	UEFA Cup, R1	Samuel Yeboah	13
2009–10	Premier	35	25	9	1	87	26	49 (Note: Hapoel Tel Aviv achieved 71 points in regular seasons, which were halved at the beginning of the play-offs. The club scored 13 more points during the play-offs for a total of 84 points.)	1st	Winners	Group	EL, Round of 32	Itay Shechter	22
2010–11	Premier	35	21	7	7	72	36	38 (Note: Hapoel Tel Aviv achieved 65 points in regular seasons, which were halved at the beginning of the play-offs. The club scored 5 more points during the play-offs for a total of 70 points.)	2nd	Winners	Group	CL, Group	Toto Tamuz	21
2011–12	Premier	37	16	14	7	63	35	59	2nd	Winners	Final	EL, Group	Omer Damari	17
2012–13	Premier	36	17	7	12	47	45	58	3rd	QF	Group	EL, Group	Omer Damari	13
2013–14	Premier	36	16	10	10	72	47	58	4th	Round of 32	–	EL, 3QR	Omer Damari	26
2014–15	Premier	33	12	8	13	36	40	42 (Note: A match between Hapoel Tel Aviv and Maccabi Tel Aviv was abandoned and was given as a 0–0 with no points awarded.)	8th	Round of 16	QF	EL, 2QR	Shlomi Azulay	5
2015–16	Premier	33	10	12	11	30	37	42	9th	Round of 16	Group	–	Aaron Schoenfeld	8
2016–17	Premier	33	8	14	11	23	40	28 (Note: 9 points were deducted)	14th	Round of 16	QF	–	Omri Altman	7
2017–18	Leumit	37	23	7	7	59	26	76	1st	Round of 32	SF	–	Shahar Hirsh	9
2018–19	Premier										SF	–		

== Key ==
- P = Played
- W = Games won
- D = Games drawn
- L = Games lost
- F = Goals for
- A = Goals against
- Pts = Points
- Pos = Final position
- Leumit = Liga Leumit (National League)
- Artzit = Liga Artzit (Nationwide League)
- Premier = Liga Al (Premier League)
- Pal. League = Palestine League
- F = Final
- Group = Group stage
- QF = Quarter-finals
- QR1 = First Qualifying Round
- QR2 = Second Qualifying Round
- QR3 = Third Qualifying Round
- QR4 = Fourth Qualifying Round
- RInt = Intermediate Round
- R1 = Round 1
- R2 = Round 2
- R3 = Round 3
- R4 = Round 4
- R5 = Round 5
- R6 = Round 6
- SF = Semi-finals

Champions	Runners-up	Promoted	Relegated
