= Hapoel Tel Aviv F.C. in international football =

Israeli club in international football

== Achievements in Europe ==
| Season | Achievement | Notes |
UEFA Champions League
| 2010–11 | Group Stage | eliminated by Lyon, Benfica, Schalke 04 (finished 4th) |
UEFA Cup
| 2001–02 | Quarter-final | eliminated by Milan |
| 2006–07 | Round of 32 | eliminated by Rangers |
| 2007–08 | Group Stage | eliminated by RSC Anderlecht, Tottenham Hotspur, Getafe CF, AaB (finished 5th) |
UEFA Europa League
| 2009–10 | Round of 32 | eliminated by FC Rubin Kazan |
| 2011–12 | Group Stage | eliminated by PSV Eindhoven, Rapid București, Legia Warsaw (finished 3rd) |
| 2012–13 | Group Stage | eliminated by Atlético Madrid, FC Viktoria Plzeň, Académica de Coimbra (finished 3rd) |

== Matches in Europe ==
| Season | Competition | Round | Opposition | Home | Away | Aggregate |
|---|---|---|---|---|---|---|
| 1981 | Intertoto Cup | Group stage | (Austria) Wiener Sportclub | 1–3 | 1–3 | 4th |
| 1981 | Intertoto Cup | Group stage | (Belgium) RFC Liège | 1–1 | 1–4 | 4th |
| 1981 | Intertoto Cup | Group stage | (Israel) Maccabi Netanya | 1–4 | 1–1 | 4th |
| 1982 | Intertoto Cup | Group stage | (Austria) Admira | 4–0 | 1–2 | 2nd |
| 1982 | Intertoto Cup | Group stage | (Sweden) Norrköping | 2–0 | 0–5 | 2nd |
| 1982 | Intertoto Cup | Group stage | (Israel) Hapoel Kfar Saba | 4–3 | 1–0 | 2nd |
| 1986 | Intertoto Cup | Group stage | (Austria) Grazer AK | 0–1 | 3–2 | 3rd |
| 1986 | Intertoto Cup | Group stage | (Denmark) Lyngby | 0–2 | 2–3 | 3rd |
| 1986 | Intertoto Cup | Group stage | (Israel) Maccabi Haifa | 2–2 | 2–2 | 3rd |
| 1995–96 | UEFA Cup | P | (Moldova) Zimbru Chisinau | 0–0 | 0–2 | 0–2 |
| 1996 | Intertoto Cup | Group stage | (Sweden) Örgryte | — | 0–3 | 5th |
| 1996 | Intertoto Cup | Group stage | (France) Rennes | 0–2 | — | 5th |
| 1996 | Intertoto Cup | Group stage | (Switzerland) Luzern | — | 0–2 | 5th |
| 1996 | Intertoto Cup | Group stage | (Croatia) Segesta | 1–3 | — | 5th |
| 1998–99 | UEFA Cup | Q1 | (Finland) FinnPa Helsinki | 3–1 | 3–1 | 6–2 |
| 1998–99 | UEFA Cup | Q2 | (Norway) Strømsgodset Drammen | 1–0 | 0–1^{(a.e.t.)} | 1–1 (2–4 p) |
| 1999–2000 | UEFA Cup | Q | (Armenia) FC Yerevan | 2–1 | 2–0 | 4–1 |
| 1999–2000 | UEFA Cup | R1 | (Scotland) Celtic | 0–1 | 0–2 | 0–3 |
| 2000–01 | Champions League | Q2 | (Austria) Sturm Graz | 1–2 | 0–3 | 1–5 |
| 2001–02 | UEFA Cup | Q | (Armenia) Ararat Yerevan | 3–0 | 2–0 | 5–0 |
| 2001–02 | UEFA Cup | R1 | (Turkey) Gaziantepspor | 1–0 | 1–1 | 2–1 |
| 2001–02 | UEFA Cup | R2 | (England) Chelsea | 2–0 | 1–1 | 3–1 |
| 2001–02 | UEFA Cup | R3 | (Russia) Lokomotiv Moscow | 2–1 | 1–0 | 3–1 |
| 2001–02 | UEFA Cup | R4 | (Italy) Parma | 0–0 | 2–1 | 2–1 |
| 2001–02 | UEFA Cup | Quarter-final | (Italy) Milan | 1–0 | 0–2 | 1–2 |
| 2002–03 | UEFA Cup | Q | (Albania) Partizan Tirana | 1–0 | 4–1 | 5–1 |
| 2002–03 | UEFA Cup | R1 | (Austria) Kärnten Klagenfurt | 0–1 | 4–0 | 4–1 |
| 2002–03 | UEFA Cup | R2 | (England) Leeds United | 0–1 | 1–4 | 1–5 |
| 2003–04 | UEFA Cup | Q | (Armenia) Banants Yerevan | 1–1 | 2–1 | 3–2 |
| 2003–04 | UEFA Cup | R1 | (Turkey) Gaziantepspor | 0–0 | 0–1 | 0–1 |
| 2006–07 | UEFA Cup | Q2 | (Slovenia) NK Domzale | 1–2 | 3–0 | 4–2 |
| 2006–07 | UEFA Cup | R1 | (Ukraine) Chornomorets Odesa | 3–1 | 1–0 | 4–1 |
| 2006–07 | UEFA Cup | Group stage | (Greece) Panathinaikos | — | 0–2 | 3rd |
| 2006–07 | UEFA Cup | Group stage | (Romania) Rapid București | 2–2 | — | 3rd |
| 2006–07 | UEFA Cup | Group stage | (France) Paris Saint-Germain | — | 4–2 | 3rd |
| 2006–07 | UEFA Cup | Group stage | (Czech Republic) Mladá Boleslav | 1–1 | — | 3rd |
| 2006–07 | UEFA Cup | Round of 32 | (Scotland) Rangers | 2–1 | 0–4 | 2–5 |
| 2007–08 | UEFA Cup | Q2 | (Bosnia and Herzegovina) Široki Brijeg | 3–0 | 3–0 | 6–0 |
| 2007–08 | UEFA Cup | R1 | (Sweden) AIK | 0–0 | 1–0 | 1–0 |
| 2007–08 | UEFA Cup | Group stage | (Belgium) RSC Anderlecht | — | 0–2 | 5th |
| 2007–08 | UEFA Cup | Group stage | (England) Tottenham Hotspur | 0–2 | — | 5th |
| 2007–08 | UEFA Cup | Group stage | (Spain) Getafe CF | — | 2–1 | 5th |
| 2007–08 | UEFA Cup | Group stage | (Denmark) AaB | 1–3 | — | 5th |
| 2008–09 | UEFA Cup | Q1 | (San Marino) A.C. Juvenes | 2–0 | 3–0 | 5–0 |
| 2008–09 | UEFA Cup | Q2 | (Serbia) Vojvodina Novi Sad | 3–0 | 0–0 | 3–0 |
| 2008–09 | UEFA Cup | R1 | (France) AS Saint-Étienne | 1–2 | 1–2 | 2–4 |
| 2009–10 | Europa League | Q3 | (Sweden) IFK Göteborg | 1–1 | 3–1 | 4–2 |
| 2009–10 | Europa League | PO | (Czech Republic) FK Teplice | 1–1 | 2–1 | 3–2 |
| 2009–10 | Europa League | Group Stage | (Germany) Hamburger SV | 1–0 | 2–4 | 1st |
| 2009–10 | Europa League | Group Stage | (Scotland) Celtic | 2–1 | 0–2 | 1st |
| 2009–10 | Europa League | Group Stage | (Austria) Rapid Wien | 5–1 | 3–0 | 1st |
| 2009–10 | Europa League | Round of 32 | (Russia) FC Rubin Kazan | 0–0 | 0–3 | 0–3 |
| 2010–11 | Champions League | Q2 | (Bosnia and Herzegovina) FK Željezničar Sarajevo | 5–0 | 1–0 | 6–0 |
| 2010–11 | Champions League | Q3 | (Kazakhstan) FC Aktobe | 3–1 | 0–1 | 3–2 |
| 2010–11 | Champions League | PO | (Austria) FC Red Bull Salzburg | 1–1 | 3–2 | 4–3 |
| 2010–11 | Champions League | Group Stage | (France) Lyon | 1–3 | 2–2 | 4th |
| 2010–11 | Champions League | Group Stage | (Portugal) Benfica | 3–0 | 0–2 | 4th |
| 2010–11 | Champions League | Group Stage | (Germany) Schalke 04 | 0–0 | 1–3 | 4th |
| 2011–12 | Europa League | Q3 | (Liechtenstein) Vaduz | 4–0 | 1–2 | 5–2 |
| 2011–12 | Europa League | PO | (Lithuania) Ekranas | 4–0 | 0–1 | 4–1 |
| 2011–12 | Europa League | Group Stage | (Netherlands) PSV Eindhoven | 0–1 | 3–3 | 3rd |
| 2011–12 | Europa League | Group Stage | (Romania) Rapid București | 0–1 | 3–1 | 3rd |
| 2011–12 | Europa League | Group Stage | (Poland) Legia Warsaw | 2–0 | 2–3 | 3rd |
| 2012–13 | Europa League | PO | (Luxembourg) F91 Dudelange | 4–0 | 3–1 | 7–1 |
| 2012–13 | Europa League | Group Stage | (Spain) Atlético Madrid | 0–3 | 0–1 | 4th |
| 2012–13 | Europa League | Group Stage | (Czech Republic) Viktoria Plzeň | 1–2 | 0–4 | 4th |
| 2012–13 | Europa League | Group Stage | (Portugal) Académica | 2–0 | 1–1 | 4th |
| 2013–14 | Europa League | Q2 | (Bulgaria) Beroe Stara Zagora | 2–2 | 4–1 | 6–3 |
| 2013–14 | Europa League | Q3 | (Romania) Pandurii Târgu Jiu | 1–2 | 1–1 | 2–3 |
| 2014–15 | Europa League | Q2 | (Kazakhstan) Astana | 1–0 | 0–3 | 1–3 |
| 2026–27 | Conference League | Q2 | (Bulgaria) Ludogorets Razgrad | 2–0 | 2–2 | 4–2 |
| 2026–27 | Conference League | Q3 | (Poland) GKS Katowice | 2–0 | 1–2 | 3–2 |
| 2026–27 | Conference League | PO | (Italy) Atalanta | 0–1 | 0–0 | 0-1 |

== Hapoel Tel Aviv in European group stages ==
=== Champions League ===
==== 2010–11 Group B ====
| Pos | Team | Pld | W | D | L | GF | GA | GD | Pts | Qualification | SCH | LYO | BEN | HTA |
|---|---|---|---|---|---|---|---|---|---|---|---|---|---|---|
| 1 | (Germany) Schalke 04 | 6 | 4 | 1 | 1 | 10 | 3 | +7 | 13 | Advance to knockout phase | — | 3–0 | 2–0 | 3–1 |
| 2 | (France) Lyon | 6 | 3 | 1 | 2 | 11 | 10 | +1 | 10 | Advance to knockout phase | 1–0 | — | 2–0 | 2–2 |
| 3 | (Portugal) Benfica | 6 | 2 | 0 | 4 | 7 | 12 | −5 | 6 | Transfer to Europa League | 1–2 | 4–3 | — | 2–0 |
| 4 | (Israel) Hapoel Tel Aviv | 6 | 1 | 2 | 3 | 7 | 10 | −3 | 5 | | 0–0 | 1–3 | 3–0 | — |

Source: Soccerway

=== Europa League ===
==== 2009–10 Group C ====
| Pos | Team | Pld | W | D | L | GF | GA | GD | Pts | Qualification | HTA | HSV | CEL | RAP |
|---|---|---|---|---|---|---|---|---|---|---|---|---|---|---|
| 1 | (Israel) Hapoel Tel Aviv | 6 | 4 | 0 | 2 | 13 | 8 | +5 | 12 | Advance to knockout phase | — | 1–0 | 2–1 | 5–1 |
| 2 | (Germany) Hamburger SV | 6 | 3 | 1 | 2 | 7 | 6 | +1 | 10 | Advance to knockout phase | 4–2 | — | 0–0 | 2–0 |
| 3 | (Scotland) Celtic | 6 | 1 | 3 | 2 | 7 | 7 | 0 | 6 | | 2–0 | 0–1 | — | 1–1 |
| 4 | (Austria) Rapid Wien | 6 | 1 | 2 | 3 | 8 | 14 | −6 | 5 | | 0–3 | 3–0 | 3–3 | — |

Source: Soccerway

==== 2011–12 Group C ====
| Pos | Team | Pld | W | D | L | GF | GA | GD | Pts | Qualification | PSV | LW | HTA | RB |
|---|---|---|---|---|---|---|---|---|---|---|---|---|---|---|
| 1 | (Netherlands) PSV Eindhoven | 6 | 5 | 1 | 0 | 13 | 5 | +8 | 16 | Advance to knockout phase | — | 1–0 | 3–3 | 2–1 |
| 2 | (Poland) Legia Warsaw | 6 | 3 | 0 | 3 | 7 | 9 | −2 | 9 | Advance to knockout phase | 0–3 | — | 3–2 | 3–1 |
| 3 | (Israel) Hapoel Tel Aviv | 6 | 2 | 1 | 3 | 10 | 9 | +1 | 7 | | 0–1 | 2–0 | — | 0–1 |
| 4 | (Romania) Rapid București | 6 | 1 | 0 | 5 | 5 | 12 | −7 | 3 | | 1–3 | 0–1 | 1–3 | — |

Source: Soccerway

==== 2012–13 Group B ====
| Pos | Team | Pld | W | D | L | GF | GA | GD | Pts | Qualification | PLZ | ATL | ACA | HTA |
|---|---|---|---|---|---|---|---|---|---|---|---|---|---|---|
| 1 | (Czech Republic) Viktoria Plzeň | 6 | 4 | 1 | 1 | 11 | 4 | +7 | 13 | Advance to knockout phase | — | 1–0 | 3–1 | 4–0 |
| 2 | (Spain) Atlético Madrid | 6 | 4 | 0 | 2 | 7 | 4 | +3 | 12 | Advance to knockout phase | 1–0 | — | 2–1 | 1–0 |
| 3 | (Portugal) Académica | 6 | 1 | 2 | 3 | 6 | 9 | −3 | 5 | | 1–1 | 2–0 | — | 1–1 |
| 4 | (Israel) Hapoel Tel Aviv | 6 | 1 | 1 | 4 | 4 | 11 | −7 | 4 | | 1–2 | 0–3 | 2–0 | — |

Source: Soccerway

=== UEFA Cup ===
==== 2006–07 Group G ====
| Pos | Team | Pld | W | D | L | GF | GA | GD | Pts | Qualification | PAN | PSG | HTA | RAP | MLA |
|---|---|---|---|---|---|---|---|---|---|---|---|---|---|---|---|
| 1 | (Greece) Panathinaikos | 4 | 2 | 1 | 1 | 3 | 4 | −1 | 7 | Advance to knockout stage | — | — | 2–0 | 0–0 | — |
| 2 | (France) Paris Saint-Germain | 4 | 1 | 2 | 1 | 6 | 4 | +2 | 5 | Advance to knockout stage | 4–0 | — | 2–4 | — | — |
| 3 | (Israel) Hapoel Tel Aviv | 4 | 1 | 2 | 1 | 7 | 7 | 0 | 5 | Advance to knockout stage | — | — | — | 2–2 | 1–1 |
| 4 | (Romania) Rapid București | 4 | 0 | 4 | 0 | 3 | 3 | 0 | 4 | | — | 0–0 | — | — | 1–1 |
| 5 | (Czech Republic) Mladá Boleslav | 4 | 0 | 3 | 1 | 2 | 3 | −1 | 3 | | 0–1 | 0–0 | — | — | — |

==== 2007–08 Group G ====
| Pos | Team | Pld | W | D | L | GF | GA | GD | Pts | Qualification | GET | TOT | AND | AAB | HTA |
|---|---|---|---|---|---|---|---|---|---|---|---|---|---|---|---|
| 1 | (Spain) Getafe | 4 | 3 | 0 | 1 | 7 | 5 | +2 | 9 | Advance to knockout stage | — | — | 2–1 | — | 1–2 |
| 2 | (England) Tottenham Hotspur | 4 | 2 | 1 | 1 | 7 | 5 | +2 | 7 | Advance to knockout stage | 1–2 | — | — | 3–2 | — |
| 3 | (Belgium) Anderlecht | 4 | 1 | 2 | 1 | 5 | 4 | +1 | 5 | Advance to knockout stage | — | 1–1 | — | — | 2–0 |
| 4 | (Denmark) AaB | 4 | 1 | 1 | 2 | 7 | 7 | 0 | 4 | | 1–2 | — | 1–1 | — | — |
| 5 | (Israel) Hapoel Tel Aviv | 4 | 1 | 0 | 3 | 3 | 8 | −5 | 3 | | — | 0–2 | — | 1–3 | — |

== Hapoel Tel Aviv in European knockout phases ==
=== UEFA Cup ===
==== 2006–07 – Round of 32 ====
| 14 February 2007 Round of 32 — 1st leg | Hapoel Tel Aviv (Israel) | 2–1 | (Scotland) Rangers | Bloomfield Stadium, Tel Aviv |
| 20:05 | Toema 43'; Dego 76' | Report | Novo 53' | Attendance: 13,000; Referee: Pedro Proença (Portugal) |

| 22 February 2007 Round of 32 — 2nd leg | Rangers (Scotland) | 4–0 | (Israel) Hapoel Tel Aviv | Ibrox, Glasgow |
| 21:05 | Ferguson 24', 73'; Boyd 35'; Adam 90+5' | Report | | Attendance: 46,213; Referee: Matteo Trefoloni (Italy) |

Rangers won 5–2 on aggregate.

=== Europa League ===
==== 2009–10 – Round of 32 ====
| 18 February 2010 Round of 32 — 1st leg | Rubin Kazan (Russia) | 3–0 | (Israel) Hapoel Tel Aviv | Central Stadium, Kazan |
| 15:00 | Bukharov 14', 23'; Semak 69' | Report | | Attendance: 7,152; Referee: William Collum (Scotland) |

| 25 February 2010 Round of 32 — 2nd leg | Hapoel Tel Aviv (Israel) | 0–0 | (Russia) Rubin Kazan | Bloomfield Stadium, Tel Aviv |
| 21:05 | | Report | | Attendance: 12,864; Referee: Pavel Kralovec (Czech Republic) |

Rubin Kazan won 3–0 on aggregate.

== Match Statistics By Competition ==
As of 21 July 2013.

| Competition | Pld | W | D | L | GF | GA | GD | % |
|---|---|---|---|---|---|---|---|---|
| Champions League | 14 | 5 | 3 | 6 | 21 | 20 | +1 | 42.85 |
| UEFA Europa League / UEFA Cup | 84 | 42 | 14 | 28 | 126 | 88 | +38 | 55.55 |
| Total | 98 | 47 | 17 | 34 | 147 | 108 | +39 | 53.74 |

== UEFA Team Ranking ==
| Season | Rank | Points |
|---|---|---|
| 2018–19 | 282 | 3.725 |
| 2017–18 | 206 | 4.350 |
| 2016–17 | 176 | 8.375 |
| 2015–16 | 135 | 13.225 |
| 2014–15 | 94 | 21.700 |
| 2013–14 | 73 | 31.375 |
| 2012–13 | 70 | 29.575 |
| 2011–12 | 64 | 31.400 |
| 2010–11 | 58 | 36.400 |
| 2009–10 | 73 | 27.775 |
| 2008–09 | 103 | 18.050 |
| 2007–08 | 108 | 21.197 |
| 2006–07 | 114 | 19.338 |
| 2005–06 | 94 | 26.108 |
| 2004–05 | 86 | 26.218 |
| 2003–04 | 78 | 26.012 |
| 2002–03 | 89 | 29.999 |
| 2001–02 | 96 | 26.666 |
