= 2014–15 Hapoel Tel Aviv F.C. season =

Hapoel Tel Aviv
2014–15 season
- Owners: Haim Ramon
- Head Coach: Asi Domb
- Stadium: Bloomfield Stadium, Tel Aviv
- Ligat Winner: TBD
- State Cup: TBD
- Top goalscorer: League: TBD; All: TBD
- Highest home attendance: TBD
- Lowest home attendance: TBD
Home colours	Away colours	Third colours

The 2014–15 season is Hapoel Tel Aviv Football Club's 87th years in the Israeli Football.

== Squad report ==
The team started the season with Asi Domb as coach. After finishing at the 4th place the previous Ligat Winner season, Hapoel Tel Aviv is Playning on Europe League.

== Transfers ==
The team so far signed Shlomi Azulay, Sari Falah, Francis Benjamin, Tom Almadon, Obeida Khattab, Aviv Dado, Shoval Gozlan, Harmony Ikande and Ariel Lazmi,

Omer Peretz, Gal Malka and Branko Ilić Release from Hapoel tel Aviv. Omer Damari Leave to Austria Wien for approximately 1.7m$ and Itay Shechter moves to FC Nantes for 400thousands euros. In addition Boris Klaiman left in favour of Beitar Jerusalem.

== Current squad ==
As of 23 September 2014.

No.	Pos.	Nation	Player
4	DF	NED	Jürgen Colin
5	DF	ISR	Sari Falah
6	MF	ISR	Gal Malka (eligible for youth team)
7	MF	ISR	Sean Malka
8	MF	ISR	Yisrael Zaguri
9	FW	ISR	Eden Shrem
10	MF	BRA	Lucas Sasha
11	MF	ISR	Ramzi Safouri (eligible for youth team)
13	GK	ISR	Danny Amos
14	MF	ISR	Gil Vermouth (Vice-captain)
15	MF	ISR	Philip Manneh
16	FW	ISR	Shlomi Azulay
18	MF	ISR	Shay Abutbul (captain)
19	MF	NGR	Harmony Ikande

No.	Pos.	Nation	Player
20	DF	ISR	Dror Nir
22	GK	ISR	Tom Almadon
23	DF	ISR	Mohammed Abu Alhija (eligible for youth team)
24	FW	ISR	Shoval Gozlan (on loan from Maccabi Haifa)
25	DF	ISR	Avraham Chekol
26	MF	ISR	Moshe Ohayon
27	FW	ISR	Matan Ariel Lazmi
29	FW	ISR	Sagiv Yehezkel (eligible for youth team)
30	DF	ISR	Lior Levi
77	DF	ISR	Obeida Khateb (on loan from Hakoah Amidar Ramat Gan)
—	GK	ISR	Avihai Dahan (eligible for youth team)
—	MF	ISR	Guy Hadida (eligible for youth team)
—	MF	ISR	Michael Hemo (eligible for youth team)
—	FW	CMR	Gaël Etock

=== Foreigners 2014–15 ===
Only up to five non-Israeli nationals can be in an Israeli club squad. Those with Jewish ancestry, married to an Israeli, or have played in Israel for an extended period of time, can claim a passport or permanent residency which would allow them to play with Israeli status.

- (Netherlands) (Suriname) Jürgen Colin
- (Nigeria) Harmony Ikande
- (Brazil) (Italy) Lucas Sasha
- (Cameroon) Gaël Etock

== Coaching staff ==
Position	Staff
General Manager	(Israel) Eyel Berkovich
First-team manager	(Israel) Asi Domb
Goalkeeper Trainer	(Israel) Yom-tov Talias
Fitness Trainer	(Israel) Dror Shimshoni
Equipment Manager	(Israel) Mordi Dadun
Club doctor	(Israel) Dr. Moshe Lweinkoff
Physio	(Israel) Ronen Tzafrir
Physio	(Israel) Gili Poterman
Head scout	(Israel) Ya'akov Hillel
President of Youth Department	(Israel) Meir Orenstein
Director of Youth	(Israel) Ze'ev Seltzer
Youth coach	(Israel) Morris Jano
Youth coach's assistant	(Israel) Rafi Samuel

Last updated: September 2012
Source: Hapoel Tel Aviv F.C. Official Website

== Premier league ==
Pos	Team	Pld	W	D	L	GF	GA	GD	Pts	Qualification
8	Maccabi Netanya	26	9	6	11	37	45	−8	33	Qualification for the relegation round
9	Bnei Sakhnin	26	7	9	10	32	37	−5	30	Qualification for the relegation round
10	Hapoel Tel Aviv (Note: Maccabi Tel Aviv and Hapoel Tel Aviv each deducted one point.)	26	8	7	11	27	33	−6	29	Qualification for the relegation round
11	F.C. Ashdod	26	6	9	11	29	41	−12	27	Qualification for the relegation round
12	Hapoel Haifa	26	7	5	14	20	41	−21	26	Qualification for the relegation round

Source: Israel Football Association
Rules for classification: 1) Points; 2) Goal difference; 3) Matches won; 4) Goals scored; 5) Head-to-head points; 6) Head-to-head goal difference; 7) Head-to-head goals scored; 8) Play-off.

=== Results by round ===
Round	1	2	3	4	5	6	7	8	9	10	11	12	13	14	15	16	17	18	19	20	21	22	23	24	25	26	27	28	29	30	31	32	33	34	35	36	37	38	39	40	41	42	43	44	45	46
Ground	H	A	H	A	H	A	H	A	H	A	H	A	H	A	H	A	H	A	H	A	H	A	H	A	H	A	n	a	n	a	n	a	n	a	n	a	n	a	n	a	n	a	n	a	n	a
Result																																														
Position																																														

Source: Israel Football Association
A = Away; H = Home; W = Win; D = Draw; L = Loss

=== Matches ===
13 September 2014 Day 1	Hapoel Tel Aviv	1 - 0	Maccabi Netanya	Tel Aviv
18:00	Abutbul (yellow card) 19'; Sârghi 24' (o.g.); Zaguri (yellow card) 33'; Lucas Sasha (yellow card) 80'	Summary	Dabour (yellow card) 82'	Stadium: Bloomfield; Referee: (Israel) Roi Reinshreiber

20 September 2014 Day 2	Ironi Kiryat Shmona	3-0	Hapoel Tel Aviv	Kiryat Shmona
20:10	Panka 36'; Elkayam (yellow card) 56'; Kassio (yellow card) 66'; Kahat 72'; Kola 82'	Summary	Benjamin (yellow card) 43'; Yehezkel (yellow card) 90'	Stadium: Shoma Stadium; Referee: (Israel) Erez Papir

27 September 2014 Day 3	Hapoel Tel Aviv	3-0	Hapoel Haifa	Tel Aviv
18:00	Vermouth 6' (yellow card) 66'; Gozlan 20'; Lucas Sasha 59'; Levi (yellow card) 79'	Summary	Abu Raiya (yellow card) 53'; Kijanskas (yellow card) 65'	Stadium: Bloomfield Stadium; Referee: (Israel) Alon Yefet

18 October 2014 Day 4	Bnei Sakhnin	1-1	Hapoel Tel Aviv	Sakhnin
20:10	Ottman (yellow card) 68'; Muhammed Zbidat (yellow card) 86'; Khalaila (yellow card) 90'; Paz 90' (yellow card) 90'	Summary	Ikande (yellow card) 66'; Abutbul (yellow card) 67'; Abu Saleh 90+3' (o.g.)	Stadium: Doha Stadium; Referee: (Israel) Eli Hacmon

Day 5	Hapoel Tel Aviv	TBD	Beitar Jerusalem	Tel Aviv
				Stadium: Bloomfield Stadium

Day 6	Hapoel Petah Tikva	TBD	Hapoel Tel Aviv	Petah Tikva
				Stadium: HaMoshava Stadium

Day 7	Hapoel Tel Aviv	TBD	Maccabi Tel Aviv	Tel Aviv
				Stadium: Bloomfield Stadium

Day 8	Hapoel Ra'anana	TBD	Hapoel Tel Aviv	Netanya
				Stadium: Netanya Stadium

Day 9	Hapoel Tel Aviv	TBD	Hapoel Be'er Sheva	Tel Aviv
				Stadium: Bloomfield Stadium

Day 10	Maccabi Haifa	TBD	Hapoel Tel Aviv	Haifa
				Stadium: Sami Ofer Stadium

Day 11	Hapoel Tel Aviv	TBD	Hapoel Acre	Tel Aviv
				Stadium: Bloomfield Stadium

Day 12	F.C. Ashdod	TBD	Hapoel Tel Aviv	Ashdod
				Stadium: Yud-Alef Stadium

Day 13	Hapoel Tel Aviv	TBD	Maccabi Petah Tikva	Tel Aviv
				Stadium: Bloomfield Stadium

Day 14	Maccabi Netanya	TBD	Hapoel Tel Aviv	Netanya
				Stadium: Netanya Stadium

Day 15	Hapoel Tel Aviv	TBD	Ironi Kiryat Shmona	Tel Aviv
				Stadium: Bloomfield Stadium

Day 16	Hapoel Haifa	TBD	Hapoel Tel Aviv	Haifa
				Stadium: Sami Ofer Stadium

Day 17	Hapoel Tel Aviv	TBD	Bnei Sakhnin	Tel Aviv
				Stadium: Bloomfield Stadium

Day 18	Beitar Jerusalem	TBD	Hapoel Tel Aviv	Jerusalem
				Stadium: Teddy Stadium

Day 19	Hapoel Tel Aviv	TBD	Beitar Jerusalem	Tel Aviv
				Stadium: Bloomfield Stadium

Day 20	Maccabi Tel Aviv	TBD	Hapoel Tel Aviv	Tel Aviv
				Stadium: Bloomfield Stadium

Day 21	Hapoel Tel Aviv	TBD	Hapoel Ra'anana	Tel Aviv
				Stadium: Bloomfield Stadium

Day 22	Hapoel Be'er Sheva	TBD	Hapoel Tel Aviv	Be'er Sheva
				Stadium: Vasermil Stadium

Day 23	Hapoel Tel Aviv	TBD	Maccabi Haifa	Tel Aviv
				Stadium: Bloomfield Stadium

Day 24	Hapoel Acre	TBD	Hapoel Tel Aviv	Acre
				Stadium: Acre Municipal Stadium

Day 25	Hapoel Tel Aviv	TBD	F.C. Ashdod	Tel Aviv
				Stadium: Bloomfield Stadium

Day 26	Maccabi Petah Tikva	TBD	Hapoel Tel Aviv	Acre
				Stadium: Acre Municipal Stadium

== UEFA Europa League ==
=== Play-off round ===
17 July 2014 1st leg	Astana (Kazakhstan)	3 - 0	(Israel) Hapoel Tel Aviv	Astana, Kazakhstan
16:00	Canas 16' (pen.); Nusserbayev 58'; Beisebekov 69'	Report		Stadium: Astana Stadium; Attendance: 10800; Referee: Sergei Ivanov (Russia)

24 July 2014 2nd leg	Hapoel Tel Aviv (Israel)	1 – 0	(Kazakhstan) Astana	Larnaca, Cyprus
20:00	Sasha 57' (pen.)	Report		Stadium: Antonis Papadopoulos Stadium; Attendance: 200; Referee: Rob Rogers (Republic of Ireland)

Hapoel Tel Aviv lost 3–1 on aggregate.

== Toto Cup ==
=== Group B ===
Pos	Team	Pld	W	D	L	GF	GA	GD	Pts	MTA	HTA	HRA	MNE
1	Maccabi Tel Aviv (A)	3	2	1	0	3	0	+3	7			2–0	
2	Hapoel Tel Aviv (A)	3	1	1	1	2	1	+1	4	1–0		0–0	
3	Hapoel Ra'anana	3	1	1	1	1	2	−1	4				1–0
4	Maccabi Netanya	3	0	1	2	0	3	−3	1	0–0	0–2		

Source: football.org.il (in Hebrew)
Legend: Blue = home team win; Yellow = draw; Red = away team win.
Rules for classification: 1st points; 2nd goal difference; 3rd matches won; 4th goals scored; 5th head-to-head; 6th decision match
(A) Advanced to the quarterfinals

== See also ==
- 2014–15 UEFA Europa League
- 2014–15 Toto Cup Al
