= 2001–02 Hapoel Tel Aviv F.C. season =

Hapoel Tel Aviv F.C.
2001–02 season
- Manager: (Israel) Dror Kashtan
- Stadium: Bloomfield Stadium, Tel Aviv
- Israeli Premier League: 2nd
- Israel State Cup: Winners
- Toto Cup: Winners
- UEFA Cup: Quarter-finals
- Top goalscorer: Serghei Cleşcenco (14)

During the 2001–02 Israeli football season, Hapoel Tel Aviv competed in the Israeli Premier League.

== Season summary ==
Hapoel Tel Aviv, although unable to claim the title, had a favorable season in the UEFA Cup. The likes of Chelsea and Parma were knocked out by the Israelis before facing Italian competitors AC Milan in the quarter-finals. Hapoel took a 1-0 lead at home, but lost 2-0 away. Nonetheless, the quarter-finals were an achievement to be proud of.

== First-team squad ==
Squad at end of season

Note: Flags indicate national team as defined under FIFA eligibility rules; some limited exceptions apply. Players may hold more than one non-FIFA nationality.

No.	Pos.	Nation	Player
1	GK	ISR	Shavit Elimelech
3	DF	ISR	Yaakov Hillel
4	DF	ISR	Dudu Dahan
5	DF	ISR	Shimon Gershon (captain)
6	MF	HUN	Gábor Halmai
7	FW	SLO	Milan Osterc
8	MF	ISR	Yossi Abukasis
9	FW	ISR	Pini Balili
10	MF	ISR	Salim Tuama
11	FW	ISR	Kfir Udi
12	MF	UKR	Denys Onischenko
15	FW	MDA	Serghei Cleșcenco
16	FW	ISR	Avi Knafo
17	MF	ISR	Ben Luz

No.	Pos.	Nation	Player
18	MF	ISR	Omri Afek
19	MF	HUN	István Pisont
20	DF	ISR	Yigal Antebi
21	DF	ISR	Ilan Bakhar
22	GK	ISR	Nir Rahamin
23	MF	ISR	Beni Hadad
24	MF	ISR	Erez Mesika
26	DF	ISR	Rami Halis
27	DF	ISR	Klemi Saban
29	DF	ISR	Tziki Kotler
30	DF	ISR	Idan Skurchero
32	DF	ISR	Asi Domb
33	GK	ISR	Guy Salem

== Results ==
=== UEFA Cup ===
==== Qualifying round ====
9 August 2001	Ararat (Armenia)	0–2	(Israel) Hapoel Tel Aviv	Yerevan, Armenia
17:00		Report	Tuama 38'; Osterc 43'	Stadium: Vazgen Sargsyan Republican Stadium; Referee: Jaromir Hlavac (Czech Republic)

==== Second round ====
18 October 2001	Hapoel Tel Aviv (Israel)	2–0	(England) Chelsea	Tel Aviv, Israel
20:15	Gershon 87' (pen.); Cleşcenco 94'	Report		Stadium: Bloomfield Stadium; Referee: Dick van Egmond (Netherlands)

1 November 2001	Chelsea (England)	1–1	(Israel) Hapoel Tel Aviv	London, England
21:00	Zola 64'	Report	Osterc 35'	Stadium: Stamford Bridge; Referee: Laurent Duhamel (France)

==== Third round ====
22 November 2001	Hapoel Tel Aviv (Israel)	2–1	(Russia) Lokomotiv Moscow	Tel Aviv, Israel
18:00	Osterc 42'; Domb 89'	Report	Izmailov 56'	Stadium: Bloomfield Stadium; Referee: Leslie Irvine (Northern Ireland)

6 December 2001	Lokomotiv Moscow (Russia)	0–1	(Israel) Hapoel Tel Aviv	Ramenskoye, Russia
18:00		Report	Osterc 48'	Stadium: Saturn Stadium; Referee: Alain Hamer (Luxembourg)

Hapoel Tel Aviv won 3–1 on aggregate.

==== Fourth round ====
21 February 2002	Hapoel Tel Aviv (Israel)	0–0	(Italy) Parma	Tel Aviv, Israel
18:30		Report		Stadium: Bloomfield Stadium; Referee: Rune Pedersen (Norway)

28 February 2002	Parma (Italy)	1–2	(Israel) Hapoel Tel Aviv	Parma, Italy
18:00	Bonazzoli 85'	Report	Osterc 31'; Pisont 54'	Stadium: Stadio Ennio Tardini; Referee: Jacek Granat (Poland)

==== Quarter-final ====
14 March 2002	Hapoel Tel Aviv (Israel)	1–0	(Italy) Milan	Nicosia, Cyprus (Note: Match played in GSP Stadium in Nicosia, Cyprus after Milan refused to play in Israel. Allegedly, the club received anonymous threats from Hamas.)
20:00	Cleșcenco 32'	Report		Stadium: GSP Stadium; Attendance: 4,000; Referee: Antonio Jesús López Nieto (Spain)

21 March 2002	Milan (Italy)	2–0	(Israel) Hapoel Tel Aviv	Milan, Italy
20:30	Rui Costa 5'; Gershon 45' (o.g.)	Report		Stadium: San Siro; Attendance: 23,184; Referee: Herbert Fandel (Germany)

Milan won 2–1 on aggregate.
