= Madon (surname) =

Madon is a surname.

Notable people with the name include:

- Ayesha Madon (born 1998), Australian actor, singer-songwriter, and musician
- Georges Madon (1892–1924), French pilot in the First World War
- Scott Madon (born 1962), American politician
- Stephanie Madon (fl. 1998–), American forensics professor

== See also ==
- Tom Almadon (born 1984), American-Israeli association footballer
