= 1955–56 Hapoel Tel Aviv F.C. season =

Hapoel Tel Aviv
1955–56 season
- Manager: Zvi Erlich
- Stadium: Basa Stadium, Tel Aviv
- Liga Alef (1955) Liga Leumit (1956): 3rd 3rd
- Top goalscorer: Michael Michaelov (17)

The 1955–56 Hapoel Tel Aviv season was the club's 33rd season since its establishment in 1923, and 8th since the establishment of the State of Israel.

At the start of the season, the league which started during the previous season was completed, with the club finishing 3rd. The new league season, with the top division being renamed Liga Leumit, began on 3 December 1955 and was completed on 3 June 1956, with the club once again finishing in 3rd place.

== Match Results ==
=== Legend ===
Win Draw Loss

=== International friendly matches ===
During the season Hapoel Tel Aviv played two international friendly matches, losing both.

30 January 1956	Hapoel Tel Aviv	0–3	FK Sarajevo	Tel Aviv
		Davar (in Hebrew)	31' Radičević; 44', 88' Jusufbegović	Stadium: Basa Stadium; Attendance: 5,000; Referee: Ben Rubi

9 June 1956	Hapoel Tel Aviv	0–1	São Cristóvão	Tel Aviv
		Ma'ariv (in Hebrew)	2' Santo Cristo	Stadium: Basa Stadium; Attendance: 4,000; Referee: Fried

=== 1954–55 Liga Alef ===
The league began on 6 February 1955, and by the time the previous season ended, only 20 rounds of matches were completed, with the final 6 rounds being played during September and October 1955.

==== Final table ====
Pos	Club	P	W	D	L	GF	GA	Gr	Pts	Notes
1	Hapoel Petah Tikva	26	18	4	4	68	23	2.96	40	Champions
2	Maccabi Tel Aviv	26	17	4	5	84	28	3.00	38	
3	Hapoel Tel Aviv	26	12	9	5	49	23	2.13	33	
4	Maccabi Netanya	26	13	7	6	54	43	1.26	33	
5	Beitar Tel Aviv	26	12	5	9	64	47	1.36	29	

==== Matches ====
3 September 1955 21	Hapoel Tel Aviv	2–0	Hapoel Ramat Gan	Tel Aviv
	Weiss 22', 86'	Report (p. 8)		Stadium: Basa Stadium; Attendance: 4,000; Referee: Dudkevich

10 September 1955 22	Maccabi Netanya	3–2	Hapoel Tel Aviv	Netanya
	Segal 50'; I. Caspi 81', 85'	Report (p. 8)	35' Rosenbaum; 60' Yehudayoff	Stadium: Sar-Tov Stadium; Attendance: 2,500; Referee: Rosenbaum

24 September 1955 23	Hapoel Tel Aviv	2–2	Maccabi Tel Aviv	Tel Aviv
	Rosenbaum 60', 63'	Report (p. 8)	32' Israeli; 37' Glazer	Stadium: Basa Stadium; Attendance: 8,000; Referee: Werner

1 October 1955 24	Hapoel Tel Aviv	3–0	Beitar Tel Aviv	Tel Aviv
	Sheli 23', 90'; Michaelov 73'	Report (p. 8)		Stadium: Basa Stadium; Attendance: 5,000; Referee: Hillman

8 October 1955 25	Maccabi Haifa	0–3	Hapoel Tel Aviv	Haifa
		Report (p. 8)	43', 61' Yehudayoff; 81' Michaelov	Stadium: Kiryat Eliezer Stadium; Attendance: 5,000; Referee: Rosenbaum

15 October 1955 26	Hapoel Tel Aviv	0–1	Hapoel Petah Tikva	Tel Aviv
		Report (p. 8)	49' Kofman	Stadium: Basa Stadium; Attendance: 6,500; Referee: Werner

==== Results by match ====
Round	1	2	3	4	5	6	7	8	9	10	11	12	13	14	15	16	17	18	19	20	21	22	23	24	25	26
Result	W	W	W	W	D	D	L	L	D	W	D	D	L	W	W	W	D	D	W	D	W	L	D	W	W	L
Position	2	1	1	1	2	3	3	3	5	4	4	5	5	5	3	3	3	3	3	3	3	3	3	3	3	3

Updated to match(es) played on 15 October 1955. Source: 2 Dear Points
W = Win; D = Draw; L = Loss

=== 1955–56 Liga Leumit ===
==== Final table ====
Pos	Club	P	W	D	L	GF	GA	GR	Pts	Notes
1	Hapoel Tel Aviv	22	13	6	3	47	16	2.94	32	Champions
2	Hapoel Petah Tikva	22	12	5	5	54	28	1.93	29	
3	Hapoel Tel Aviv	22	12	5	5	49	29	1.69	29	
4	Maccabi Petah Tikva	22	10	7	5	47	34	1.38	27	
5	Maccabi Haifa	22	11	3	8	51	29	1.76	25	

==== Matches ====
3 December 1955 1	Hapoel Ramat Gan	0–1	Hapoel Tel Aviv	Givatayim
			32' Rosenbaum	Stadium: Hamakhtesh Stadium; Attendance: 2,500; Referee: Sher

10 December 1955 2	Hapoel Tel Aviv	2–0	Maccabi Netanya	Tel Aviv
	Yehudayoff 54', 60'			Stadium: Basa Stadium; Attendance: 3,000; Referee: Fried

17 December 1955 3	Hapoel Kfar Saba	1–5	Hapoel Tel Aviv	Kfar Saba
	Tzahobel 31'		14' Tish; 52', 66', 80' Weiss; 57' Rosenbaum	Stadium: Hapoel Ground; Attendance: 1,500; Referee: Ben-Rubi

24 December 1955 4	Hapoel Tel Aviv	5–1	Hapoel Haifa	Tel Aviv
	Weiss 27'; Balut 39'; Rosenbaum 49', 89'; Yehudayoff 77'		24', o.g.' Cynowicz	Stadium: Basa Stadium; Attendance: 4,000; Referee: Zahavi

31 December 1955 5	Hapoel Tel Aviv	0–2	Maccabi Haifa	Tel Aviv
			22', 66' S. Levi	Stadium: Basa Stadium; Attendance: 8,000; Referee: Levichter

7 January 1956 6	Maccabi Rehovot	3–2	Hapoel Tel Aviv	Rehovot
	Litvak 12'; Schmilovich 23'; Hodorov 70' (o.g.)		85' (pen.) Hodorov; 89' Michaelov	Stadium: Maccabi Ground

14 January 1956 7	Maccabi Petah Tikva	4–4	Hapoel Tel Aviv	Petah Tikva
	Carmeli 14'; I. Ben-Dror 45', 64' (pen.), 71'		23' (pen.) Balut; 47' B. Goldstein; 72', 79' Michaelov	Stadium: Maccabi Ground; Attendance: 3,500; Referee: Hillman

21 January 1956 8	Hapoel Tel Aviv	1–0	Hapoel Petah Tikva	Tel Aviv
	Michaelov 45'			Stadium: Basa Stadium; Attendance: 7,000; Referee: Sher

11 February 1956 9	Maccabi Jaffa	2–2	Hapoel Tel Aviv	Tel Aviv
	Miranda 46' (pen.); Ghougasian 77'		45' Rosenbaum; 56' (pen.) Balut	Stadium: Maccabi Jaffa Ground; Referee: Frizner

18 February 1956 10	Hapoel Tel Aviv	3–1	Beitar Tel Aviv	Tel Aviv
	Weiss 30'; Michaelov 63'; Rosenbaum 81'		28' Bar-zion	Stadium: Basa Stadium; Attendance: 6,000; Referee: Moshe Cohen

25 February 1956 11	Maccabi Tel Aviv	3–0	Hapoel Tel Aviv	Tel Aviv
	Y. Fuchs 33', 37'; Glazer 77'			Stadium: Basa Stadium; Attendance: 5,000; Referee: Ben-Rubi

3 March 1956 12	Hapoel Tel Aviv	2–0	Hapoel Ramat Gan	Tel Aviv
	Michaelov 60', 73'			Stadium: Basa Stadium; Attendance: 1,500; Referee: Hoze

10 March 1956 13	Maccabi Netanya	1–2	Hapoel Tel Aviv	Netanya
	I. Caspi 38'		5' Yehudayoff; Rosenbaum	Stadium: Sar-Tov Stadium; Attendance: 3,000; Referee: Sher

17 March 1956 14	Hapoel Tel Aviv	0–0	Hapoel Kfar Saba	Tel Aviv
				Stadium: Basa Stadium; Referee: Fried

24 March 1956 15	Hapoel Haifa	2–2	Hapoel Tel Aviv	Haifa
	Nestenfober 1'; Ginzburg 60'		37', 50' Yehudayoff	Stadium: Kiryat Eliezer Stadium; Attendance: 5,000; Referee: Moshe Cohen

31 March 1956 16	Maccabi Haifa	2–2	Hapoel Tel Aviv	Haifa
	Ben-Tzvi 75' (pen.); Almani 83'		69' Michaelov; 88' Balut	Stadium: Kiryat Eliezer Stadium; Attendance: 6,000; Referee: Dudkevich

7 April 1956 17	Hapoel Tel Aviv	7–1	Maccabi Rehovot	Tel Aviv
	Weiss 1' (pen.); Michaelov 3', 31', 52', 54'; R. Rosenbaum 67'; Yehudayoff 85'		34' Rosenbaum	Stadium: Basa Stadium; Attendance: 2,500; Referee: Sher

14 April 1956 18	Hapoel Tel Aviv	2–0	Maccabi Petah Tikva	Tel Aviv
	Yehudayoff 57'; Balut 71' (pen.)			Stadium: Basa Stadium; Attendance: 6,037; Referee: Ben-Rubi

22 April 1956 19	Hapoel Petah Tikva	1–2	Hapoel Tel Aviv	Petah Tikva
	Vissoker 65' (pen.)		20' Michaelov; 30' (pen.) Balut	Stadium: Hapoel Ground; Attendance: 6,000; Referee: Fritzner

19 May 1956 20	Hapoel Tel Aviv	0–2	Maccabi Jaffa	Tel Aviv
			Ghougasian 42'; Kalev 50'	Stadium: Basa Stadium; Referee: Sher

27 May 1956 21	Beitar Tel Aviv	0–5	Hapoel Tel Aviv	Tel Aviv
			19', 88' Rosenbaum; 15', 32' Michaelov; 59' Yehudayoff	Stadium: Basa Stadium; Attendance: 4,000; Referee: Hillman

2 June 1956 22	Hapoel Tel Aviv	0–3	Maccabi Tel Aviv	Tel Aviv
			35', 84' R. Levi; 65' Nahmias	Stadium: Basa Stadium; Attendance: 15,000; Referee: Fritzner

==== Results by match ====
Round	1	2	3	4	5	6	7	8	9	10	11	12	13	14	15	16	17	18	19	20	21	22
Result	W	W	W	W	L	L	D	W	D	W	L	W	W	D	D	D	W	W	W	L	W	L
Position	1	1	1	1	3	3	3	3	3	2	4	3	1	1	1	2	2	2	1	2	2	3

Updated to match(es) played on 28 July 1956. Source: IFA
W = Win; D = Draw; L = Loss

=== Shapira Cup ===
In October and November, while the promotion playoffs and the State Cup were being played, two cup competitions were organized by Liga Leumit Clubs, the second edition of the Shapira Cup, and the Netanya 25th Anniversary Cup. Maccabi Haifa, Hapoel Petah Tikva, Hapoel Tel Aviv and Maccabi Tel Aviv played for the Shapira Cup, named after former Hapoel Tel Aviv treasurer Yosef Shapira. The competition was designed to be played as a double round-robin tournament but the competition was delayed after the teams playing only two matches each, as the third round matches were postponed due to weather conditions and then due to the 1954–55 Israel State Cup final, which involved Maccabi Tel Aviv and Hapoel Petah Tikva. As league matches started on 3 December 1955, the competition was abandoned altogether.

==== Table ====
Pos	Team	Pld	W	D	L	GF	GA	GR	Pts
1	Maccabi Tel Aviv	2	2	0	0	7	4	1.750	4
2	Maccabi Haifa	2	1	0	1	7	7	1.000	2
3	Hapoel Petah Tikva	2	1	0	1	6	6	1.000	2
4	Hapoel Tel Aviv	2	0	0	2	3	6	0.500	0

Source: Hadshot HaSport, p. 1

27 August 1955 1	Maccabi Tel Aviv	2–1	Hapoel Tel Aviv	Tel Aviv
	Glazer 29', 75'		89' Weiss	Stadium: Basa Stadium; Attendance: 5,500; Referee: Rosenbaum

5 November 1955 2	Hapoel Tel Aviv	2–4	Hapoel Petah Tikva	Tel Aviv
	Weiss 12', 15'	Report (p. 8)	11' Stelmach; 27', 65' Kofman; 68' Markus	Stadium: Basa Stadium; Attendance: 3,000; Referee: Rosenbaum
