= Laura Smalarz =

Psychologist researcher

Laura Smalarz is a psychologist researching psychology as it is related to the law. Smalarz focuses her work on forensic evidence, eyewitness identification, and the wrongfully convicted. She is an associate professor of psychology and director of the psychology and law lab at Arizona State University.

== Education ==
Laura Smalarz received a Bachelor's degree in psychology from the University of San Diego in 2008. She proceeded to receive a PhD in social psychology from Iowa State University in 2015 under the mentorship of both Gary Wells and Stephanie Madon. Smalarz focused her dissertation, entitled Pre Feedback Eyewitness Statements: Proposed Safeguard Against Feedback Effects on Evaluations of Eyewitness Testimony, on how eyewitness testimony is used to implement convictions in the United States, more specifically wrongful convictions. Majority of her graduate work and published papers are focused eyewitness identification and eyewitness testimony.

== Career ==
Freshly out of graduate school, Laura took a position as an assistant professor of psychology at Williams College in Massachusetts where she worked until July 2019. During her time at Williams College, she published a number of papers and journal articles focusing on stereotype bias, eyewitness lineups and identification, memory performance during lineups, and an analysis of Miranda following its 50-year anniversary.

After leaving Williams College in 2019, Laura took a position as an associate professor of psychology in the School of Interdisciplinary Forensics at Arizona State University. At Arizona State University, Smalarz teaches a number of psychological research classes as well as psychology of criminal investigation.

Smalarz is also the director of the Psychology and Law Lab at Arizona State University. Her lab studies all types of eyewitness factors including identification, confidence, and testimony especially in regards to social influence and stereotyping. The main focus of her research lab includes evaluating eyewitness identification evidence in regards to legal professionals and how it can influence wrongful convictions. Along with teaching and running a research lab, Smalarz is an Editorial Board member for multiple psychological journals including Law and Human Behavior; Psychology, Public Policy, and Law; and Psychology Crime and Law. She also has associations with the Innocence Project, serving on the Research Advisory Board.

== Research ==
Smalarz began her research at Iowa State University under the direction of Gary Wells and Stephanie Madon. Beginning in 2011, she was first featured as an author in two different journals: Oxford Bibliographies and the Journal of Clinical and Social Psychology. Both of these journal articles focused on eyewitness identification and testimony, as well as stereotyping within these categories. However, the article published in the Journal of Clinical and Social Psychology regarding the negative implications of racial bias in eyewitness identification is her most cited article to date, with a total of 440 citations as of October 2024.

In 2012, Laura published a paper with the American Psychological Association about the effects of eyewitness certainty in an identification process. In this specific paper, she was featured as the first author for the first time. Throughout her time at Iowa State University, she continued to publish multiple papers in various journal articles about the problems with eyewitness identification. Smalarz received a grant from the National Institute of Justice Graduate Research Fellowship Program to complete her dissertation which focused on the relationship between eyewitness identification and how it leads to wrongful convictions.

During her time at Williams College, she published numerous papers regarding eyewitness testimony and identification. These papers each had unique takes on eyewitness testimony and identification including: stereotyping, memory performance, wrongfully convicted exonerations through the use of DNA, police interrogations, lineups, and mobilization and resistance to name a few. Also during this time, she conducted a 50 year anniversary psychological analysis on Miranda rights which has been cited a number of time.

Throughout her short career at Arizona State University, Laura has been busy publishing a wide range of papers with a primary focus specifically regarding wrongful convictions in relation to eyewitness identification. Her early work at Arizona State University offers various takes on disclosing feedback to eyewitness identification, confidence and reliability, and line ups. In 2023, she published three different papers discussing the effects race and social stereotypes in a legal setting, as well as how race influences wrongful convictions. In 2024, Smalarz has published a paper evaluating the confidence of eyewitness testifiers in their identifications of a suspect who experienced sub-optimal witnessing conditions. She is currently in the process of researching the phenomena of assuming a suspect is guilty when they choose to remain silent.

== Community outreach and advocacy ==
Laura Smalarz dedicates a lot of her time doing work for the National Innocence Project, including making multiple appearances in media speaking on and defending the wrongfully convicted. In these appearances, she specifically focuses and speaks on wrongfully convicted Lydell Grant. In this specific case, Smalarz worked to determine issues in a lineup that wrongfully identified Grant to a lifetime in prison. In her article, she discusses how many lineups are conducted with previous bias and a suspect already in mind. She states, "The police did not use scientific best practices for collecting the eyewitness identification evidence" and continues on to explain the bias choices that led to Grant's conviction.

Smalarz has also made an appearance on the One Minute Remaining Podcast, where she spoke about the implications eyewitness testimony has on wrongful convictions. In another interview, she emphasizes the import of research and how impactful it can be for not only the students and researchers, but specifically in her case, the wrongfully incarcerated. Smalarz says, "Having research experience can be make-or-break for students who are applying to graduate school. Experience cannot be overstated".
