= 1954–55 Hapoel Tel Aviv F.C. season =

Hapoel Tel Aviv
1954–55 season
- Manager: Zvi Erlich
- Stadium: Basa Stadium, Tel Aviv
- Liga Alef: not completed
- State Cup: Round 4
- Top goalscorer: League: Rosenbaum (11); All: Rosenbaum (18)

The 1954–55 Hapoel Tel Aviv season was the club's 32nd season since its establishment in 1923, and 7th since the establishment of the State of Israel.

During the season, the club competed in Liga Alef (top division) and the State Cup. In addition, the club played in the privately organized Shapira Cup, a four-club league competition.

== Review and events ==
- On 10 October 1954 Udarnik Sofia arrived at Israel on the club's invitation, as a return visit to Hapoel's tour of Bulgaria at the end of the previous season. Udarnik played three matches, against Hapoel XI, a team composed of the best Hapoel affiliated players, against Tel Aviv XI, a mixed Hapoel and Maccabi team, and against Petah Tikva XI, a team mixed Hapoel and Maccabi Petah Tikva team. Udarnik won all three matches. At the end of the tour, as the Bulgarians encountered problems with obtaining visas for a layover in Istanbul, a fourth match was arranged with mixed teams of Udarnik, Hapoel Tel Aviv and Maccabi Jaffa.
- During December 1954 and January 1955, as no league matches were played due to a dispute between Hapoel, Maccabi and Beitar factions in the IFA, The club organized a league competition for the top Tel Aviv teams, Hapoel, Maccabi, Beitar and Maccabi Jaffa. The competition was played as a double round-robin tournament, with the top placed team winning the cup, named after former Hapoel Tel Aviv treasurer, Yosef Shapira. The club won five matches and lost one, topping the table and winning the cup.
- In early May 1955, Brazilian team Associação Atlética Portuguesa visited Israeli, playing three matches, the second of which was played against Hapoel Tel Aviv. The Brazilians beat Hapoel 4–0. A mixed Maccabi-Hapoel team played against Portuguesa and lost 4–0.

== Match results ==
=== Legend ===
Win Draw Loss

=== Liga Alef ===
League matches began on 6 February 1955, and by the time the season, only 20 rounds of matches were completed, delaying the end of the league season to the next season.

==== League table (as of 2 July 1955) ====
Pos	Team	Pld	W	D	L	GF	GA	GR	Pts
1	Maccabi Tel Aviv	20	14	3	3	68	20	3.400	31
2	Hapoel Petah Tikva	20	13	4	3	38	15	2.533	30
3	Hapoel Tel Aviv	20	9	8	3	37	17	2.176	26
4	Beitar Tel Aviv	20	9	5	6	48	36	1.333	23
5	Maccabi Petah Tikva	20	8	6	6	27	24	1.125	22

Updated to match(es) played on 2 July 1955. Source: Hadshot HaSport, 3 July 1955 (in Hebrew)

==== Matches ====
5 February 1955 1	Hapoel Tel Aviv	2–0	Hapoel Hadera	Tel Aviv
	Rosenbaum 20'; Hecht 78'	Report (p. 8)		Stadium: Basa Stadium; Attendance: 2,500; Referee: Yelink

12 February 1955 2	Hapoel Balfouria	0–2	Hapoel Tel Aviv	Afula
		Report	21', 62' Rosenbaum	Stadium: Hapoel Ground

19 February 1955 3	Hapoel Tel Aviv	1–0	Hapoel Haifa	Tel Aviv
	Zilberstein 19'	Report (p. 8)		Stadium: Basa Stadium; Attendance: 6,000; Referee: Fried

26 February 1955 4	Maccabi Rehovot	1–4	Hapoel Tel Aviv	Rehovot
	Vider 23'	Report (p. 8)	39' D. Goldstein; 42' (pen.), 51' (pen.) Balut; 66' Alaluf	Stadium: Maccabi Ground; Attendance: 1,500; Referee: Scheinhaus

5 March 1955 5	Beitar Jerusalem	2–2	Hapoel Tel Aviv	Jerusalem
	Elfasi 4'; Yehezkel 70'	Report (p. 8)	23' Balut; 82' Michaelov	Stadium: YMCA Stadium; Attendance: 9,000; Referee: Sher

12 March 1955 6	Hapoel Tel Aviv	1–1	Maccabi Petah Tikva	Tel Aviv
	Yehudayoff 67'	Report (p. 8)	75' Bernard	Stadium: Basa Stadium; Attendance: 3,500; Referee: Ben-Rubi

19 March 1955 7	Hapoel Tel Aviv	0–2	Hapoel Kfar Saba	Tel Aviv
		Report (p. 8)	9' (pen.) Bulman; 64' H. Glazer	Stadium: Basa Stadium; Attendance: 4,000; Referee: Scheindling

2 April 1955 8	Hapoel Ramat Gan	1–0	Hapoel Tel Aviv	Givatayim
	Fritzner 52'			Stadium: HaMakhtesh Stadium

9 April 1955 9	Hapoel Tel Aviv	1–1	Maccabi Rehovot	Tel Aviv
	Alaluf 83'	Report (p. 8)	61' Hosias	Stadium: Basa Stadium; Attendance: 1,500; Referee: Zahavi

13 April 1955 10	Hapoel Tel Aviv	2–1	Maccabi Tel Aviv	Tel Aviv
	Yehudayoff 11'; Rosenbaum 78'	Report (p. 4)	26' Glazer	Stadium: Basa Stadium; Attendance: 7,000; Referee: Sher

16 April 1955 11	Hapoel Tel Aviv	1–1	Beitar Tel Aviv	Tel Aviv
	Yehudayoff 50'	Report (p. 8)	Huli 53'	Stadium: Basa Stadium; Attendance: 9,000; Referee: Frizner

23 April 1955 12	Hapoel Tel Aviv	1–1	Maccabi Haifa	Tel Aviv
	Alaluf 88'	Report	73' Hardy	Stadium: Basa Stadium; Attendance: 3,000; Referee: Hillman

30 April 1955 13	Hapoel Petah Tikva	1–0	Hapoel Tel Aviv	Petah Tikva
	Kofman 82'	Report (p. 8)		Stadium: Hapoel Ground; Attendance: 4,500; Referee: Werner

14 May 1955 14	Hapoel Hadera	0–1	Hapoel Tel Aviv	Hadera
		Report (p. 8)	60' Rosenbaum	Stadium: Hapoel Ground; Attendance: 2,800; Referee: Dudkevich

21 May 1955 15	Hapoel Tel Aviv	8–1	Hapoel Balfouria	Tel Aviv
	Rosenbaum 5', 35', 54', 76'; Weiss 42', 43', 45'; Alaluf 77'	Report (p. 8)	46' Dubnov	Stadium: Basa Stadium; Attendance: 3,000; Referee: Stern

4 June 1955 16	Hapoel Haifa	0–4	Hapoel Tel Aviv	Haifa
		Report (p. 8)	25', 77' Weiss; 54', 85' Michaelov	Stadium: Kiryat Haim Stadium; Attendance: 3,500; Referee: Dudkevich

11 June 1955 17	Hapoel Tel Aviv	1–1	Maccabi Rehovot	Tel Aviv
	Rosenbaum 10'	Report (p. 8)	25' Litvak	Stadium: Basa Stadium; Attendance: 5,000; Referee: Yonas

18 June 1955 18	Hapoel Tel Aviv	1–1	Beitar Jerusalem	Tel Aviv
	Balut 24' (pen.)	Report (p. 8)	73' elfasi	Stadium: Basa Stadium; Attendance: 6,000; Referee: Markovich

26 June 1955 19	Maccabi Petah Tikva	1–4	Hapoel Tel Aviv	Petah Tikva
	Spiegel 87'	Report (p. 8)	20', 35', 71' Michaelov; 55' Rosenbaum	Stadium: Maccabi Ground; Attendance: 2,000; Referee: Frizner

3 July 1955 20	Hapoel Kfar Saba	1–1	Hapoel Tel Aviv	Kfar Saba
	Avrutski 17'	Report (p. 8)	60' Rosenbaum	Stadium: Hapoel Ground; Attendance: 1,500; Referee: Fried

==== Results by match ====
Match	1	2	3	4	5	6	7	8	9	10	11	12	13	14	15	16	17	18	19	20
Result	W	W	W	W	D	D	L	L	D	W	D	D	L	W	W	W	D	D	W	D
Position	2	1	1	1	2	3	3	3	5	4	4	5	5	5	3	3	3	3	3	3

Updated to match(es) played on 3 July 1955. Source: 2 Dear Points
W = Win; D = Draw; L = Loss

=== State Cup ===
26 March 1955 Round 3	Hapoel Tel Aviv	5–0	Beitar Jerusalem	Tel Aviv
	Yehudayoff 4', 13', 69', 84'; Rosenbaum 8'			Stadium: Basa Stadium

28 May 1955 Round 4	Hapoel Hadera	1–0	Hapoel Tel Aviv	Hadera
	Afgin 26'			Stadium: Hapoel Ground; Attendance: 1,500; Referee: Rosenbaum

=== Shapira Cup ===
==== League table ====
Pos	Team	Pld	W	D	L	GF	GA	GR	Pts
1	Hapoel Tel Aviv (W)	6	5	0	1	12	7	1.714	10
2	Maccabi Tel Aviv	6	4	0	2	16	8	2.000	8
3	Beitar Tel Aviv	6	2	0	4	7	8	0.875	4
4	Maccabi Jaffa	6	1	0	5	5	17	0.294	2

Source: Hadshot HaSport, p. 1
(W) Winners

==== Results ====
4 December 1954 1	Hapoel Tel Aviv	2–1	Beitar Tel Aviv	Tel Aviv
	Michaelov 18'; Yehudayoff 75'		26' Elmaliah	Stadium: Basa Stadium; Attendance: 7,000; Referee: Frisner

11 December 1954 2	Maccabi Jaffa	1–3	Hapoel Tel Aviv	Tel Aviv
	B. Cohen 2'		51' Sheli; 55', 70' Rosenbaum	Stadium: Basa Stadium; Attendance: 6,500; Referee: Dudkevich

18 December 1954 3	Hapoel Tel Aviv	2–1	Maccabi Tel Aviv	Tel Aviv
	Rosenbaum 15'; Fuchs 46'		90' Reznik	Stadium: Basa Stadium; Attendance: 8,000; Referee: Ben-Rubi

25 December 1954 4	Beitar Tel Aviv	1–2	Hapoel Tel Aviv	Tel Aviv
	Huli 55'		7' Rosenbaum; 72' (pen.) Balut	Stadium: Basa Stadium; Attendance: 6,000; Referee: Rosenbaum

8 January 1955 5	Hapoel Tel Aviv	2–1	Maccabi Jaffa	Tel Aviv
	Rosenbaum 9'; Zilberstein 88'		63' B. Cohen	Stadium: Basa Stadium; Attendance: 4,000; Referee: Werner

15 January 1955 6	Maccabi Tel Aviv	2–1	Hapoel Tel Aviv	Tel Aviv
	Reznik 10'; Schweitzer 15' (o.g.)		81' Rosenbaum	Stadium: Basa Stadium; Attendance: 7,000; Referee: Moshe Cohen
