= 2011–12 Hapoel Tel Aviv F.C. season =

Hapoel Tel Aviv
2011-12 season
- Chairman: (Israel) Eli Tabib
- Manager: (Israel) Dror Kashtan, (Israel) Nitzan Shirazi
- Stadium: Bloomfield Stadium, Tel Aviv
- Ligat Ha'Al: 2nd
- State Cup: 1st
- Toto Cup: 2nd
- Top goalscorer: League: (Israel) Omer Damari (17); All: (Israel) Omer Damari (25)
- Highest home attendance: 14,500 vs Maccabi Tel Aviv (5 March 2012)
- Lowest home attendance: 4,000 vs Bnei Yehuda Tel Aviv (13 August 2011)
- Average home league attendance: 12,325
Home colours	Away colours	Third colours

The 2011–12 season is Hapoel Tel Aviv's 71st season in Israeli Premier League, and their 22nd consecutive season in the top division of Israeli football.

This season the club was eliminated from the group stage of the Europa League.

This season the club get -3 point on the league

== UEFA Europa League ==
=== Qualification ===
Date	Opponents	H / A	Result F – A	Scorers	Attendance
28 July 2011	(Switzerland) FC Vaduz	H	4-0	Kende 24'; Tamuz 45'; Damari 49'; Cohen 45';	7,500
4 August 2011	(Switzerland) FC Vaduz	A	1-2	Damari 1'	750
18 August 2011	(Lithuania) FK Ekranas	A	0-1		1,000
25 August 2011	(Lithuania) FK Ekranas	H	4-0	Cohen 37'; Damari 53'; Tamuz 81'; Lala 90';	8,000

=== Group C ===
Date	Opponents	H / A	Result F – A	Scorers	Attendance
15 September 2011	(Romania) FC Rapid București	H	0–1		7,700
29 September 2011	(Poland) Legia Warsaw	A	2-3	Tamuz 34'; Lala 78';	15,000
20 October 2011	(Netherlands) PSV Eindhoven	H	0-1		12,500
3 November 2011	(Netherlands) PSV Eindhoven	A	3-3	Damari 10'; Tamuz 33', 47';	30,000
1 December 2011	(Romania) FC Rapid București	A	3-1	Igiebor 12'; Tamuz 39'; Toama 45';	7,000
14 December 2011	(Poland) Legia Warsaw	H	2-0	Toama 33'; Yadin 76';	5,500

Pos	Team	Pld	W	D	L	GF	GA	GD	Pts	Qualification
1	(Netherlands) PSV Eindhoven	6	5	1	0	13	5	+8	16	Advance to knockout phase
2	(Poland) Legia Warsaw	6	3	0	3	7	9	−2	9	Advance to knockout phase
3	(Israel) Hapoel Tel Aviv	6	2	1	3	10	9	+1	7	
4	(Romania) Rapid București	6	1	0	5	5	12	−7	3	

Source: Soccerway

== Ligat Ha'Al (Premier League) ==
=== Regular season ===
Date	Opponents	H / A	Result F – A	Scorers	Attendance
22 August 2011	Maccabi Petah Tikva	H	4 – 1	Tamuz 15', 45'; Damari 58'; Igiebor 68';	7,750
28 August 2011	Bnei Yehuda Tel Aviv	A	1 – 1		6,500
11 September 2011	Beitar Jerusalem	H	1 – 0	Damari 78';	14,000
18 September 2011	Hapoel Akko	A	2 – 0	Tamuz 20'; Damari 72';	2,000
21 September 2011	Hapoel Be'er Sheva	H	2 – 0	Fransman 85'; Toama 90';	7,500
24 September 2011	Hapoel Haifa	H	0 – 0		9,570
3 October 2011	Maccabi Netanya	A	1 – 2	Yadin 63';	4,000
15 October 2011	Hapoel Petah Tikva	H	5 – 0	Damari 15', 27', 65'; Tamuz 51', 79';	10,000
23 October 2011	F.C. Ashdod	A	0 – 2		4,000
29 October 2011	Ironi Rishon LeZion	H	6 – 0	Damari 32', 45'; Cohen 39'; Badeer 51'; Tamuz 71', 90';	6,500
6 November 2011	Bnei Sakhnin	A	1 – 0	Damari 25';	6,000
20 November 2011	Ironi Ramat HaSharon	H	0 – 0		5,000
27 November 2011	Maccabi Tel Aviv	A	3 – 1	Pečalka 38'; Cohen 45'; Abutbul 90';	14,000
5 December 2011	Maccabi Haifa	H	3 – 0	Cohen 49'; Damari 52'; Tamuz 90';	14,500
12 December 2011	Ironi Kiryat Shmona	A	0 – 1		5,000
18 December 2011	Maccabi Petah Tikva	A	0 – 1		6,000
24 December 2011	Bnei Yehuda Tel Aviv	H	1 – 1	Damari 2';	8,500
28 December 2011	Beitar Jerusalem	A	1 – 1	Tamuz 10';	9,500
31 December 2011	Hapoel Akko	H	2 – 1	Mishaelof (Own Goal) 2'; Tamuz 25'	8,500
7 January 2012	Hapoel Be'er Sheva	A	1 – 1	Gordana 25';	6,000
16 January 2012	Hapoel Haifa	A	0 – 3		6,000
21 January 2012	Maccabi Netanya	H	7 – 3	Damari 15', 78'; Abutbul 26'; Tamuz 33', 65', 84'; Toama 74';	8,500
29 January 2012	Hapoel Petah Tikva	A	3 – 2	Cohen 14'; Yadin 60'; Lala 63';	3,200
4 February 2012	F.C. Ashdod	H	0 – 0		8,000
11 February 2012	Ironi Rishon LeZion	A	2 – 1	Badeer 53'; Damari 73';	1,700
18 February 2012	Bnei Sakhnin	H	0 – 0		5,000
25 February 2012	Ironi Ramat HaSharon	A	1 – 1	Oremuš 90';	800
5 March 2012	Maccabi Tel Aviv	H	0 – 1		14,500
12 March 2012	Maccabi Haifa	A	4 – 1	Oremuš 26'; Igiebor 55', 83'; Damari 90';	13,000

Pos	Team	Pld	W	D	L	GF	GA	GD	Pts	Qualification
1	Ironi Kiryat Shmona	30	19	9	2	42	15	+27	66	Qualification for the championship round
2	Hapoel Tel Aviv (Note: Hapoel Tel Aviv were deducted three points due to crowd riots in the match against Maccabi Tel Aviv.)	30	14	10	6	53	27	+26	49	Qualification for the championship round
3	Bnei Sakhnin (Note: Bnei Sakhnin were deducted two points due to double contracts with players and staff.)	30	14	7	9	49	35	+14	47	Qualification for the championship round
4	F.C. Ironi Ashdod	30	12	11	7	39	33	+6	47	Qualification for the championship round
5	Maccabi Netanya	30	13	8	9	44	40	+4	47	Qualification for the championship round

Source: Israel Football Association
Rules for classification: 1st points; 2nd goal difference; 3rd matches won; 4th goals scored; 5th head-to-head; 6th decision match

=== Top playoff ===
Date	Opponents	H / A	Result F – A	Scorers	Attendance
18 March 2012	Ironi Kiryat Shmona	H	2 – 2	Gordana 31'; Abutbul 58';	1,500
24 March 2012	Maccabi Tel Aviv	H	0 – 0		No Attendance
2 April 2012	Ironi Kiryat Shmona	A	0 – 0		4,500
14 April 2012	Bnei Yehuda Tel Aviv	H	3 – 3	Abutbul 45'; Cohen 81'; Toama 82';	No Attendance
28 April 2012	Bnei Sakhnin	H	3 – 1	Lala 45'; Damari 51'; Abutbul 74';	6,000
5 May 2012	F.C. Ashdod	A	2 – 0	Lala 35', 90';	1,500
8 May 2012	Maccabi Netanya	H	1 – 3	Damari 9';	7,500
12 May 2012	Maccabi Haifa	A	1 – 1	Cohen 54';	11,000

Pos	Team	Pld	W	D	L	GF	GA	GD	Pts	Qualification
1	Ironi Kiryat Shmona (C)	37	21	10	6	48	26	+22	73	Qualification for the Champions League second qualifying round
2	Hapoel Tel Aviv (Note: Hapoel Tel Aviv were deducted three points due to crowd riots in the match against Maccabi Tel Aviv.)	37	16	14	7	63	35	+28	59	Qualification for the Europa League play-off round (Note: Hapoel Tel Aviv qualified for the play-off round of the 2012–13 UEFA Europa League after winning the 2011–12 Israel State Cup. As they finished second, the fourth-placed team of the league also qualified for the Europa League.)
3	Bnei Yehuda	37	16	11	10	53	36	+17	59	Qualification for the Europa League second qualifying round
4	Maccabi Netanya	37	17	8	12	54	48	+6	59	Qualification for the Europa League second qualifying round
5	Maccabi Haifa	37	16	10	11	56	44	+12	58	

Source: Israel Football Association
Rules for classification: 1st points; 2nd goal difference; 3rd matches won; 4th goals scored; 5th head-to-head; 6th decision match
(C) Champions

== State Cup ==
Date	Round	Opponents	H / A	Result F – A	Scorers	Attendance
8 February 2012	Round 9	Maccabi Yavne	H	3 – 0	Abbas 25'; Damari 71'; Lala 90';	1,500
21 March 2012	Round of 16	Bnei Lod	A	3 – 1	Oremuš 46'; Igiebor 92', 115';	500
12 April 2012	Quarter-final	Maccabi Netanya	A	1 – 0	Cohen 59';	6,000
2 May 2012	Semi-final	Ironi Ramat HaSharon	N	3 – 0	Damari 96'; Tamuz 105'; Toama 118';	10,000
15 May 2012	Final	Maccabi Haifa	N	2 – 1	Oremuš 58'; Igiebor 90';	37,000

== Toto Cup ==
=== Group C ===
Date	Opponents	H / A	Result F – A	Scorers	Attendance
31 July 2011	Maccabi Tel Aviv	H	2 – 2	Fransman 28'; Lala 53';	9,000
7 August 2011	Hapoel Akko	A	2 – 0	Lala 25'; Damari 40';	1,000
13 August 2011	Bnei Yehuda Tel Aviv	H	2 – 2	Tamuz 20'; Lala 78';	4,000

Pos	Team	Pld	W	D	L	GF	GA	GD	Pts
1	Maccabi Tel Aviv (A)	3	2	1	0	4	2	+2	7
2	Hapoel Tel Aviv (A)	3	1	2	0	6	4	+2	5
3	Bnei Yehuda	3	1	1	1	6	4	+2	4
4	Hapoel Acre	3	0	0	3	1	8	−7	0

Source: football.org.il (in Hebrew)
Rules for classification: 1st points; 2nd goal difference; 3rd matches won; 4th goals scored; 5th head-to-head; 6th decision match
(A) Advanced to the quarterfinals

=== Knockout phase ===
Date	Opponents	H / A	Result F – A	Scorers	Attendance
26 October 2011	Ironi Ramat HaSharon	A	5 – 3	Lala 1', 104'; Damari 14'; Tamuz 85'; Cohen 120';	1,000
10 January 2012	Maccabi Petah Tikva	N	3 – 1	Badir 40'; Cohen 50';Oremuš 82';	1,100
24 January 2012	Ironi Kiryat Shmona	N	1 – 1 3 – 4 P	Abbas 95';	1,000
