= 2010–11 Hapoel Tel Aviv F.C. season =

Hapoel Tel Aviv
2010–11 season
- Owners: Moni Harel; Eli Tabib
- Head coach: Eli Guttman
- Stadium: Bloomfield Stadium, Tel Aviv
- Premier League: 2nd
- State Cup: Winners
- Champions League: Group stage
- Toto Cup: Group stage
Home colours	Away colours	Third colours

The 2010–11 season is Hapoel Tel Aviv's 70th season in the Israeli Premier League. It was the second time the club participates in the qualification round of the UEFA Champions League, and the first ever qualification to the Group stage.

== Ligat Ha'Al (Premier League) ==
Kickoff times are in EET.

Win Draw Loss Postponed

=== Regular season ===
21 August 2010 1	Hapoel Haifa	1 – 0	Hapoel Tel Aviv	Haifa
18:00 EET		Report		Stadium: Kiryat Eliezer Stadium; Referee: Eitan Shmuelevich

28 August 2010 2	Hapoel Tel Aviv	5 – 1	Hapoel Ashkelon	Tel Aviv
19:30 EET		Report		Stadium: Bloomfield Stadium; Referee: Liran Waxberger

11 September 2010 3	Hapoel Acre	2 – 2	Hapoel Tel Aviv	Nazareth Illit
17:00 EET		Report		Stadium: Green Stadium; Referee: Assaf Keinan

25 September 2010 4	Hapoel Tel Aviv	2 – 4	Ironi Kiryat Shmona	Tel Aviv
15:00 EET		Report		Stadium: Bloomfield Stadium; Referee: Shay Shitrit

2 October 2010 5	Maccabi Netanya	1 – 3	Hapoel Tel Aviv	Netanya
19:30 EET		Report		Stadium: Sar-Tov Stadium; Referee: Eitan Tabrizi

16 October 2010 6	Hapoel Tel Aviv	1 – 0	Maccabi Tel Aviv	Tel Aviv
21:00 EET		Report		Stadium: Bloomfield Stadium; Referee: Assaf Keinan

24 October 2010 7	Maccabi Petah Tikva	1 – 2	Hapoel Tel Aviv	Ramat Gan
20:00 EET		Report		Stadium: Ramat Gan Stadium; Referee: Eli Hachmon

30 October 2010 8	Hapoel Tel Aviv	3 – 2	Hapoel Be'er Sheva	Ramat Gan
19:30 EET		Report		Stadium: Ramat Gan Stadium; Referee: Menashe Mashiach

8 November 2010 9	Maccabi Haifa	0 – 2	Hapoel Tel Aviv	Haifa
20:45 EET		Report		Stadium: Kiryat Eliezer Stadium; Referee: Liran Liani

14 November 2010 10	Hapoel Tel Aviv	0 – 0	Beitar Jerusalem	Tel Aviv
20:45 EET		Report		Stadium: Bloomfield Stadium; Referee: Meir Levi

20 November 2010 11	Bnei Sakhnin	1 – 3	Hapoel Tel Aviv	Sakhnin
17:00 EET		Report		Stadium: Doha Stadium; Referee: Alon Yeffet

28 November 2010 12	Hapoel Tel Aviv	0 – 2	F.C. Ashdod	Tel Aviv
20:10 EET		Report		Stadium: Bloomfield Stadium; Referee: Haim Yaakov

4 December 2010 13	Hapoel Petah Tikva	1 – 5	Hapoel Tel Aviv	Ramat Gan
17:15 EET		Report		Stadium: Ramat Gan Stadium; Referee: Eitan Shmuelevich

15 December 2010 14	Bnei Yehuda Tel Aviv	0 – 1	Hapoel Tel Aviv	Tel Aviv
20:00 EET		Report		Stadium: Bloomfield Stadium; Referee: Eli Hachmon

18 December 2010 15	Hapoel Tel Aviv	4 – 0	Hapoel Ramat Gan	Haifa
19:05 EET		Report		Stadium: Kiryat Eliezer Stadium; Referee: Alon Yeffet

1 January 2011 16	Hapoel Tel Aviv	5 – 0	Hapoel Haifa	Tel Aviv
17:10 EET		Report		Stadium: Bloomfield Stadium; Referee: Moshe Bukhbut

8 January 2011 17	Hapoel Ashkelon	0 – 2	Hapoel Tel Aviv	Ashkelon
19:30 EET		Report		Stadium: Sala Stadium; Referee: Eitan Shmuelevich

17 January 2011 18	Hapoel Tel Aviv	4 – 1	Hapoel Acre	Tel Aviv
20:45 EET		Report		Stadium: Bloomfield Stadium; Referee: Daniel Bar-Natan

24 January 2011 19	Ironi Kiryat Shmona	1 – 1	Hapoel Tel Aviv	Kiryat Shmona
20:45 EET		Report		Stadium: Municipal Stadium; Referee: Eli Hachmon

29 January 2011 20	Hapoel Tel Aviv	2 – 1	Maccabi Netanya	Tel Aviv
19:30 EET		Report		Stadium: Bloomfield Stadium; Referee: Eitan Tabrizi

6 February 2011 21	Maccabi Tel Aviv	1 – 1	Hapoel Tel Aviv	Tel Aviv
20:45 EET		Report		Stadium: Bloomfield Stadium; Referee: Eitan Tabrizi

14 February 2011 22	Hapoel Tel Aviv	2 – 0	Maccabi Petah Tikva	Ramat Gan
20:45 EET		Report		Stadium: Ramat Gan Stadium; Referee: Shai Shitrit

19 February 2011 23	Hapoel Be'er Sheva	0 – 3	Hapoel Tel Aviv	Be'er Sheva
19:30 EET		Report		Stadium: Vasermil Stadium; Referee: Eli Hachmon

27 February 2011 24	Hapoel Tel Aviv	4 – 1	Maccabi Haifa	Tel Aviv
20:45 EET		Report		Stadium: Bloomfield Stadium; Referee: Alon Yeffet

7 March 2011 25	Beitar Jerusalem	1 – 0	Hapoel Tel Aviv	Jerusalem
20:45 EET		Report		Stadium: Teddy Stadium; Referee: Eitan Shmuelevich

12 March 2011 26	Hapoel Tel Aviv	1 – 0	Bnei Sakhnin	Tel Aviv
17:00 EET		Report		Stadium: Bloomfield Stadium; Referee: Ziv Adler

20 March 2011 27	F.C. Ashdod	3 – 3	Hapoel Tel Aviv	Ashdod
20:45 EET		Report		Stadium: Yud-Alef Stadium; Referee: Alon Yeffet

4 April 2011 28	Hapoel Tel Aviv	2 – 0	Hapoel Petah Tikva	Tel Aviv
20:45 EET		Report		Stadium: Bloomfield Stadium; Referee: Meir Levi

9 April 2011 29	Hapoel Tel Aviv	0 – 1	Bnei Yehuda Tel Aviv	Tel Aviv
19:30 EET		Report		Stadium: Bloomfield Stadium; Referee: Liran Liani

16 April 2011 30	Hapoel Ramat Gan	1 – 2	Hapoel Tel Aviv	Ramat Gan
19:30 EET	Shina 63'	Report	Sahar 1'; Badir 58'	Stadium: Winter Stadium; Referee: Liran Waxberger

==== Table ====
Pos	Team	Pld	W	D	L	GF	GA	GD	Pts	Qualification
1	Maccabi Haifa	30	21	7	2	55	25	+30	70	Qualification for the championship round
2	Hapoel Tel Aviv	30	20	5	5	65	27	+38	65	Qualification for the championship round
3	Maccabi Tel Aviv	30	15	5	10	41	33	+8	50	Qualification for the championship round
4	Ironi Kiryat Shmona	30	13	9	8	50	34	+16	48	Qualification for the championship round
5	Bnei Yehuda	30	13	9	8	33	27	+6	48	Qualification for the championship round

Source: Israel Football Association
Rules for classification: 1st points; 2nd goal difference; 3rd matches won; 4th goals scored; 5th head-to-head; 6th decision match

=== Top playoff ===
25 April 2011 31	Hapoel Tel Aviv	2 – 1	Bnei Yehuda	Tel Aviv
20:45 EET	Zahavi 21'; Dvalishvili 87'	Report	Marinković 58'	Stadium: Bloomfield Stadium; Referee: Eitan Tabrizi

30 April 2011 32	Maccabi Haifa	2 – 0	Hapoel Tel Aviv	Haifa
21:00 EET	Katan 30'; Dvalishvili 66'	Report		Stadium: Kiryat Eliezer Stadium; Referee: Meir Levi

7 May 2011 33	Hapoel Tel Aviv	2 – 2	Maccabi Netanya	Tel Aviv
16:30 EET	Tamuz 68', 72'	Report	Saba'a 56'; Tertiak 75'	Stadium: Bloomfield Stadium; Referee: Assaf Keinan

14 May 2011 34	Hapoel Tel Aviv	2 – 2	Maccabi Tel Aviv	Tel Aviv
19:30 EET	Fransman 4'; Sahar 90'	Report	Colautti 71', 77'	Stadium: Bloomfield Stadium; Referee: Menashe Mashiah

21 May 2011 35	Ironi Kiryat Shmona	2 – 1	Hapoel Tel Aviv	Kiryat Shmona
20:00 CET	Abuhatzira 49'; Amashe 91'	Report	Tamuz 86'	Stadium: Municipal Stadium; Referee: Guy Berger

==== Table ====
Pos	Team	Pld	W	D	L	GF	GA	GD	Pts	Qualification
1	Maccabi Haifa (C)	35	24	8	3	63	28	+35	45	Qualification for the Champions League second qualifying round
2	Hapoel Tel Aviv	35	21	7	7	72	36	+36	38	Qualification for the Europa League third qualifying round (Note: Hapoel Tel Aviv have qualified for the third qualifying round of the 2011–12 UEFA Europa League after winning the 2010–11 Israel State Cup.)
3	Maccabi Tel Aviv	35	18	6	11	53	40	+13	35	Qualification for the Europa League second qualifying round
4	Bnei Yehuda	35	15	10	10	42	34	+8	31	Qualification for the Europa League second qualifying round
5	Ironi Kiryat Shmona	35	14	10	11	57	45	+12	28	
6	Maccabi Netanya	35	12	13	10	47	47	0	27	

Source: Israel Football Association
Rules for classification: 1st points; 2nd goal difference; 3rd matches won; 4th goals scored; 5th head-to-head; 6th decision match
(C) Champions

== Israel State Cup ==
Kickoff times are in EET.

Win Draw Loss Postponed

2 February 2011 Eighth Round	Maccabi Ironi Kiryat Ata	0 – 7	Hapoel Tel Aviv	Kiryat Ata
13:00 CET		Report		Stadium: Municipal Stadium; Referee: Ziv Adler

2 March 2011 Round of 16	Hapoel Tel Aviv	2 – 1	Hapoel Ashkelon	Tel Aviv
19:00 CET		Report		Stadium: Bloomfield Stadium; Referee: Ziv Adler

19 April 2011 Quarter-final	Hapoel Tel Aviv	1 – 0	Beitar Jerusalem	Tel Aviv
21:00 CET		Report		Stadium: Bloomfield Stadium; Referee: Eli Hachmon

11 May 2011 Semi-final	Hapoel Tel Aviv	2 – 0	Ironi Kiryat Shmona	Ramat Gan
18:00 CET		Report		Stadium: Ramat Gan Stadium; Referee: Eitan tabrizi

25 May 2011 Final	Maccabi Haifa	0 – 1	Hapoel Tel Aviv	Ramat Gan
20:50 CET		Report		Stadium: Ramat Gan Stadium; Referee: Meir Levi

== UEFA Champions League ==
All times CEST (UTC+2)

=== Second qualifying round ===
13 July 2010 1st leg	Hapoel Tel Aviv (Israel)	5 – 0	(Bosnia and Herzegovina) Željezničar	Tel Aviv, Israel
20:00		Report		Stadium: Bloomfield Stadium; Referee: Mark Clattenburg

21 July 2010 2nd leg	Željezničar (Bosnia and Herzegovina)	0 – 1	(Israel) Hapoel Tel Aviv	Sarajevo, Bosnia and Herzegovina
20:15		Report		Stadium: Asim Ferhatović Hase Stadium^{1} Referee: Carlos Clos Gómez

Hapoel Tel Aviv won 6–0 on aggregate.

=== Third qualifying round ===
28 July 2010 1st leg	Aktobe (Kazakhstan)	1 – 0	(Israel) Hapoel Tel Aviv	Aktobe, Kazakhstan
18:00		Report		Stadium: Aktobe Central Stadium; Referee: Sascha Kever

3 August 2010 2nd leg	Hapoel Tel Aviv (Israel)	3 – 1	(Kazakhstan) Aktobe	Tel Aviv, Israel
20:00		Report		Stadium: Bloomfield Stadium; Referee: Robert Schörgenhofer

Hapoel Tel Aviv won 3–2 on aggregate.

=== Play-off round ===
18 August 2010 1st leg	Red Bull Salzburg (Austria)	2 – 3	(Israel) Hapoel Tel Aviv	Wals-Siezenheim, Austria
20:45		Report		Stadium: Red Bull Arena; Referee: Pedro Proença

24 August 2010 2nd leg	Hapoel Tel Aviv (Israel)	1 – 1	(Austria) Red Bull Salzburg	Tel Aviv, Israel
20:45		Report		Stadium: Bloomfield Stadium; Referee: Pieter Vink

Hapoel Tel Aviv won 4–3 on aggregate.

=== Group stage ===
Pos	Team	Pld	W	D	L	GF	GA	GD	Pts	Qualification
1	(Germany) Schalke 04	6	4	1	1	10	3	+7	13	Advance to knockout phase
2	(France) Lyon	6	3	1	2	11	10	+1	10	Advance to knockout phase
3	(Portugal) Benfica	6	2	0	4	7	12	−5	6	Transfer to Europa League
4	(Israel) Hapoel Tel Aviv	6	1	2	3	7	10	−3	5	

Source: Soccerway

14 September 2010 Matchday 1	Benfica (Portugal)	2 – 0	(Israel) Hapoel Tel Aviv	Lisbon, Portugal
20:45		Report		Stadium: Estádio da Luz; Attendance: 31,512; Referee: Aleksei Nikolaev (Russia)

29 September 2010 Matchday 2	Hapoel Tel Aviv (Israel)	1 – 3	(France) Lyon	Tel Aviv, Israel
20:45		Report		Stadium: Bloomfield Stadium; Attendance: 12,226; Referee: Aleksei Nikolaev (Russia)

20 October 2010 Matchday 3	Schalke 04 (Germany)	3 – 1	(Israel) Hapoel Tel Aviv	Gelsenkirchen, Germany
20:45		Report		Stadium: Veltins-Arena; Attendance: 50,436; Referee: Gianluca Rocchi (Italy)

2 November 2010 Matchday 4	Hapoel Tel Aviv (Israel)	0 – 0	(Germany) Schalke 04	Tel Aviv, Israel
20:45		Report		Stadium: Bloomfield Stadium; Attendance: 12,132; Referee: Frank De Bleeckere (Belgium)

24 November 2010 Matchday 5	Hapoel Tel Aviv (Israel)	3 – 0	(Portugal) Benfica	Tel Aviv, Israel
20:45		Report		Stadium: Bloomfield Stadium; Attendance: 11,668; Referee: Alain Hamer (Luxembourg)

7 December Matchday 6	Lyon (France)	2 – 2	(Israel) Hapoel Tel Aviv	Lyon, France
20:45		Report		Stadium: Stade de Gerland; Attendance: 32,245; Referee: Svein Oddvar Moen (Norway)

Notes

- Note 1: Played in Sarajevo at Asim Ferhatović Hase Stadium as Željezničar's Grbavica Stadium did not meet UEFA criteria.

== See also ==
- 2010–11 Israeli Premier League
- 2010–11 Israel State Cup
- 2010–11 UEFA Champions League
