= Avi Knafo =

Israeli footballer

Avi Knafo אבי כנפו
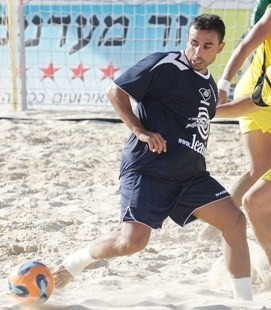

Personal information
- Full name: Avi Knafo
- Date of birth: August 4, 1982 (age 44)
- Place of birth: Netanya, Israel
- Position: Striker

Team information
- Current team: Hapoel Ra'anana
- Number: 18

Youth career
- Beitar Nes Tubruk

Senior career*
Years	Team	Apps	(Gls)
2001–2005	Hapoel Tel Aviv	34	(5)
2005–2009	Hapoel Kfar Saba	86	(9)
2009	Maccabi Netanya	14	(0)
2009–2011	Hapoel Ra'anana	28	(4)
2011–2012	Hapoel Acre	17	(2)
2012	Hapoel Ra'anana	11	(1)

International career
2001–2003	Israel U21	7	(0)
- * Club domestic league appearances and goals

Avi Knafo (Hebrew: אבי כנפו; born August 4, 1982) is a former Israeli footballer.

== Club career ==
Knafo began his career in the youth team of Beitar Nes Tubruk and joined to the first team of Hapoel Tel Aviv in 2001–02 season.

In 2005, he moved to Hapoel Kfar Saba until January 2009 when he moved to Maccabi Netanya where he failed to be in the starting line-up and so in July he made a move to the newly promoted Hapoel Ra'anana.

== International career ==
Knafo has 7 appearances in the Israel national under-21 football team. His first appearance was on August 15, 2001, against Turkey.

== Honours ==
- Toto Cup (1):
  - 2001-02
