= Francis Benjamin =

Nigerian footballer

Personal information
- Full name: Francis Ishida Benjamin
- Date of birth: 20 June 1993 (age 33)
- Place of birth: Nigeria
- Height: 1.82 m (5 ft 11 1/2 in)
- Position: Left back

Team information
- Current team: Speranța Nisporeni

Senior career*
Years	Team	Apps	(Gls)
2012–2014	Heartland	57	(3)
2014–2015	Hapoel Tel Aviv	3	(0)
2015–	Speranța Nisporeni	0	(0)

International career^{‡}
2012–	Nigeria	11	(0)
- * Club domestic league appearances and goals as of 7 June 2014 ‡ National team caps and goals as of 7 June 2013

Francis Ishida Benjamin (born 20 June 1993) is a Nigerian footballer who plays for Speranța Nisporeni as a left-back.

== International career ==
Benjamin had his debut in 2010 and has been a regular since a friendly match against Niger on 15 August 2012. He was selected for Nigeria's squad at the 2013 FIFA Confederations Cup and played in 2014 world cup qualifiers.
