= Avraham Chekol =

Israeli footballer (born 1992)

Avraham Chekol אברהם צ'קול
Personal information
- Full name: Avraham Chekol
- Date of birth: 26 January 1992 (age 34)
- Place of birth: Netanya, Israel
- Height: 1.75 m (5 ft 9 in)
- Position: Right back

Youth career
- Maccabi Netanya
- 2008–2012: Hapoel Kfar Saba

Senior career*
Years	Team	Apps	(Gls)
2011–2013	Hapoel Kfar Saba	51	(0)
2013–2015	Hapoel Tel Aviv	28	(0)
2016	Hapoel Jerusalem	10	(0)
2016–2017	Maccabi Sha'arayim	23	(0)
2017–2018	Maccabi Herzliya	6	(0)
2018	Hapoel Ramat HaSharon	14	(0)
2018–2019	Hapoel Umm al-Fahm	23	(0)
2020	Hakoah Amidar Ramat Gan	5	(0)
2020–2021	Maccabi Tamra	7	(0)
2021–2022	F.C. Tira	32	(2)
2022–2023	Ihud Bnei Shefa-'Amr	10	(1)

International career
2014–2015	Israel U21	0	(0)
- * Club domestic league appearances and goals

Avraham Chekol (Hebrew: אברהם צ'קול; born 26 January 1992) is an Israeli former footballer.

== Career ==
Chekol Played in the youth department of Maccabi Netanya and moved in 2008 to Hapoel Kfar Saba, and played in the first team squad between 2011 and 2013.

Chekol signed at Hapoel Tel Aviv in the end of June 2013.
