= Erez Mesika =

Israeli footballer

Erez Mesika ארז מסיקה
Personal information
- Date of birth: 20 December 1979 (age 46)
- Place of birth: Pardes Hanna-Karkur, Israel
- Height: 1.84 m (6 ft 0 in)
- Position: Midfielder

Youth career
- Maccabi Haifa

Senior career*
| Years | Team | Apps | (Gls) |
| 1999–2000 | Maccabi Haifa | 0 | (0) |
| 2000–2001 | Hapoel Tel Aviv | 7 | (0) |
| 2001–2002 | Maccabi Netanya | 9 | (1) |
| 2002–2003 | Hapoel Haifa | 23 | (1) |
| 2003–2008 | Maccabi Tel Aviv | 113 | (10) |
| 2008–2009 | AEK Larnaca | 15 | (1) |
| 2009–2010 | Hapoel Be'er Sheva | 5 | (0) |
- * Club domestic league appearances and goals as of 12:17, 23 November 2009 (UTC)

Erez Mesika (Hebrew: ארז מסיקה; born 1979) is a retired Israeli professional football (soccer) player who is of a Tunisian-Jewish descent. Mesika played on the left side of the midfield and has spent the bulk of his career with Maccabi Tel Aviv. There he enjoyed some of his greatest professional achievements including qualifying for the UEFA Champions League.

At the end of his contract with Maccabi Tel Aviv in 2008, he decided to move to Cypriot AEK Larnaca where he signed a one-year deal. After his contract ended at the summer of 2009 he had signed at the newly promoted former Israeli Champions Hapoel Be'er Sheva but was sidelined early in the season because of heart problem that later caused him to announce his retirement from professional football career at the age of 30 .

== Honours ==
=== With Maccabi Tel Aviv ===
- State Cup: 2004/05
