= Dudu Dahan =

Israeli footballer and agent (born 1971)

Dudu Dahan דודו דהאן
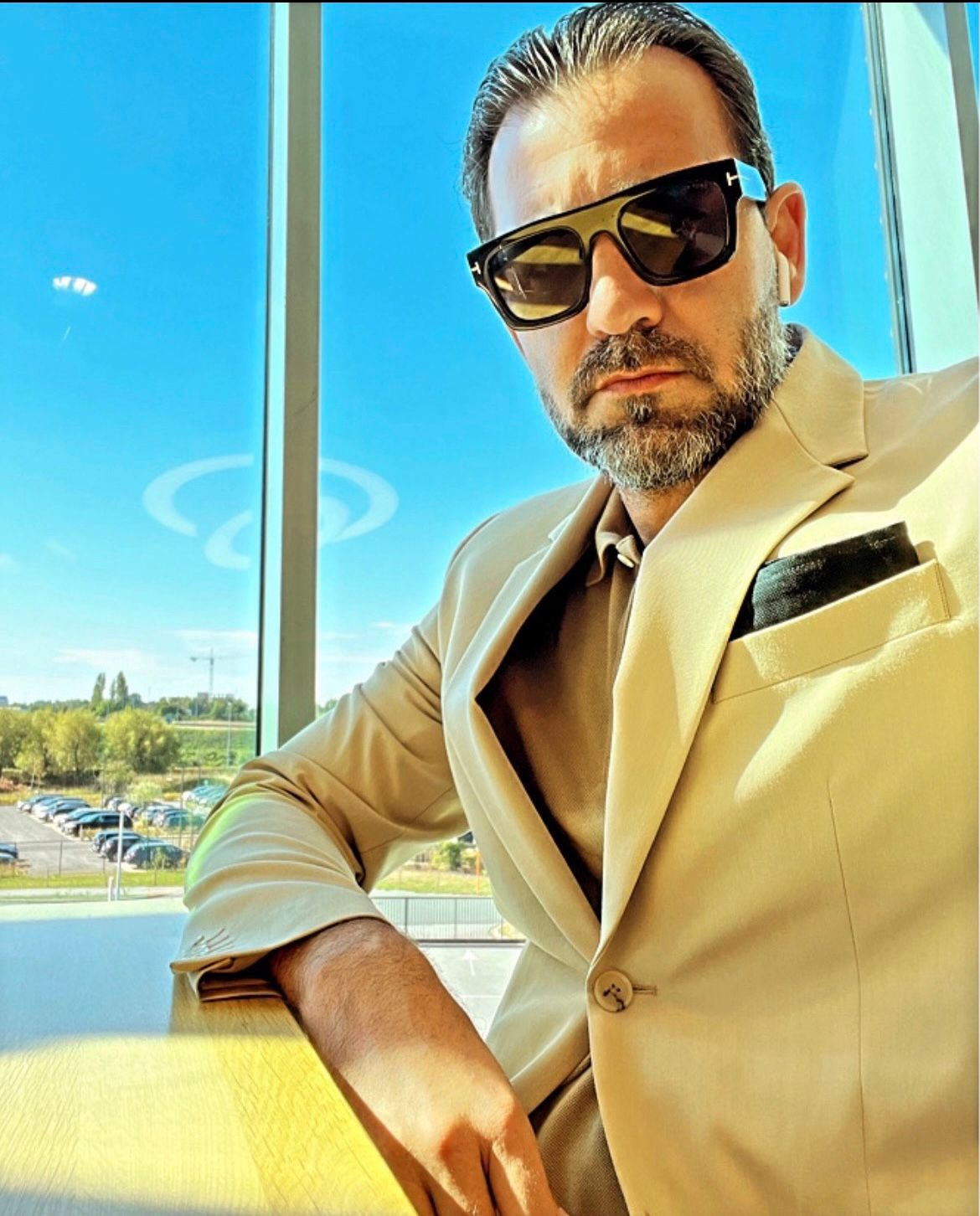

Personal information
- Full name: David Dahan
- Date of birth: 8 December 1971 (age 54)
- Place of birth: Jerusalem, Israel
- Height: 6 ft 1 in (1.85 m)
- Position: Defender

Senior career*
| Years | Team | Apps | (Gls) |
| 1990–1998 | Hapoel Jerusalem | 85 | (3) |
| 1998–1999 | Hapoel Beit She'an | | |
| 1999–2000 | Hapoel Jerusalem | 35 | (2) |
| 2000–2002 | Hapoel Tel Aviv | | |
| 2002–2004 | Hapoel Jerusalem | | |

Managerial career
- 2007–2009: Hakoah Ramat Gan
- * Club domestic league appearances and goals

Dudu Dahan (Hebrew: דודו דהאן; born 8 December 1971 in Jerusalem, Israel) is a retired professional football player and manager, currently working sports agent working mainly with Israeli football players and managers. He is the owner of Scoutpush, a sports agency who represents football and managers worldwide.

Dahan has been involved in some of the most expensive transfers in Israel Football history, and considered a "super agent". He is licensed as a football agent from the Israel and Belgium Football Association, and he holds a PRO coaching diploma.

In 2021, Dahan published his memoir, "The Agent," in Hebrew. The English version was published in 2022.

== Career as a football player and manager ==
Dahan was born in Baka, Jerusalem. At a young age, he joined the youth department of Hapoel Jerusalem F.C., where he played most of his professional career as a center-back defender. In 1998, he signed in Hapoel Beit She'an F.C. In the summer of 2000, he signed with then-champion Hapoel Tel Aviv F.C. during his period there, he was injured in the cruciate ligament in his knee and integrated into the coaching staff and Scouting division. Afterward, he signed for a brief period in F.C. Kiryat Gat. Following that, he returned to Hapoel Jerusalem F.C. in 2003 for one season and then retired from his career as a professional football player.

In 2005 Dahan was appointed as a sports director in Beitar Jerusalem, while Luis Fernandez was the team's coach. In Season of 2006/2007, Fernandez was replaced by Osvaldo Ardiles. In Dahan's 2005–2007 term as a sports director, Beitar won two championships and two time cup winner. Till this day, the team hasn't won any other titles.

In 2007, he was appointed as a manager for Hakoah Amidar Ramat Gan F.C. parallel to that, he started his career as a sports agent. In 2009, he shifted his focus mainly toward representing football players and coaches as a sports agent.

== Main activity as an agent (2007–present) ==
As a sports agent, Dahan developed good connections in Belgium football and with Celtic F.C. In 2007, Dahan negotiated the transfer of Gili Vermouth from Hapoel Tel Aviv FC to KAA Gent and Salim Tuama from the same team to Royal Standard de Liege. Dahan also negotiated the transfer of Elyaniv Barda from Hapoel Tel Aviv to K.R.C. Genk. He later represented Barda in his period at Hapoel Be'er Sheva.

He continued to work mostly in Israel and Belgium and Rami Gershon (Royal Standard de Liege), Eytan Tibi (Charleroi SC) and Omer Golan (K.S.C. Lokeren Oost-Vlaanderen) were all part of his early work days in Belgium. KAA Gent bought his representative, Shlomi Arbeitman on 2010 in the amount of €1.5 million. In the same year Lior Refaelov moved from Maccabi Haifa to Club Brugge K.V. on a €2.5 million transfer fee. Beram Kayal also moved from Maccabi Haifa in 2010, joining Scottish club Celtic in a £1.2 million transfer deal.

In 2011, Dahan negotiated the transfer of Maor Buzaglo from Maccabi Tel Aviv to Royal Standard de Liege. Also in that year, Wisla Krakow recruited the first Israeli player in Poland from Hapoel Beer Sheva, Maor Melikson, who was bought in 750,000 Euro. Later, another Israeli player, Dudu Biton, joined Wisla Krakow, who later moved to Royal Standard de Liege, Apoel Nicosia (Cyprus) and NK Maribor (Slovenia), as Dahan represented him in all of those transfers. Before Biton came to Wisla Krakow he was one of several Israeli players who signed for Charleroi SC: Tamir Kahlon, Matan Ohayon, Eitan Tibi, and Hatem Abd Elhamed.

In August 2012, Nigerian international defender Efe Ambrose became the second player represented by Dahan to join Celtic, when he moved from SC Ashdod to Scotland. Dahan was also behind the transfer of Marko Šuler from Hapoel Tel Aviv to Legia Warszawa.

In summer 2013, Dahan negotiated the signing of Israeli coach Guy Luzon from the U21 National team of Israel to Royal Standard de Liege alongside Center Back, Tal Ben Haim. The captain of the U21 National Team of Israel, Nir Biton, moved on a 1 million-euro deal from SC Ashdod to Celtic FC. In 2014 Sintayehu Sallalich became the first Israeli player in Slovenia, represented by Dahan to NK Maribor. Rami Gershon and Kenny Sayef moved to KAA Gent, the later on a 200,000-euro deal from Hapoel Ramat HaSharon.

In 2016, Dahan negotiated the transfer of Portuguese Orlando Sá from Maccabi Tel Aviv to Royal Standard de Liege.

In 2018, Dahan represented Gabi Kanichowsky in his transfer from Hapoel Acre to Maccabi Netanya. He later transferred to Maccabi Tel aviv in a deal negotiated by Dahan. Also that year, he negotiated for Marwan Kabha in his transfer to Hapoel Be'er Sheva.

In 2019, Dahan orchestrated the transfer of Gadi Kinda to Beitar Jerusalem. The following year, Dahan represented Kinda in his transfer to Sporting Kansas City. Also that year, Dahan represented Dan Biton in a transfer to PFC Ludogorets Razgrad. He was later transferred to Maccabi Tel Aviv in 2021. Dahan orchestrated one of his biggest the deals in 2019: The transfer of Samuel Kalu to FC Girondins de Bordeaux for €9 million.

In 2020, Dahan negotiated the transfer of Ismaila Soro from Bney Yehuda To Celtic for €2.5 million transfer fee. Also that year, he was behind the return of Taleb Tawatha to Maccabi Haifa.

In 2021, Dahan negotiated the transfer of Liel Abada from Maccabi Petah Tikva To Celtic. Also that year, Dahan was behind the transfer of Dean David to Maccabi Haifa. Dahan also negotiated on behalf of Mohammad Abu Fani in his negotiation with Maccabi Haifa.

In 2022, Dahan was behind the transfer of Yonas Malede from KAA Gent to K.V. Mechelen for €2 million transfer fee. Also that year, Dahan represented Osher Davida in his transfer from Hapoel Tel Aviv to Royal Standard de Liege. Dahan also negotiated on behalf of coach Barak Bakhar in his negotiation with Maccabi Haifa. Also that year, Dahan negotiated the transfer of Danny Gropper to PFC Ludogorets Razgrad. Dahan was also behind the transfer of Mavis Tchibota to Maccabi Haifa from PFC Ludogorets Razgrad.

In 2023, Dahan was behind the transfer of Eden Kartsev to İstanbul Başakşehir. Dahan was also behind the signing of coach Barak Bakhar in Red Star.

== Honors ==
=== As a player ===
- Israel State Cup:
  - Runner-up (1): 1998
- Toto Cup
  - Winner (1): 2001–02

=== As a manager ===
- Second Division
  - Winner (1): 2007-08
- Toto Cup Leumit
  - Runner-up (1): 2007-08
- Israel State Cup
  - Semifinalist (1): 2009

== Managerial stats ==
| Team | Nat | From | To | Record | | | | |
| Team | Nat | From | To | P | W | D | L | Win % |
|---|---|---|---|---|---|---|---|---|
| Hakoah Amidar Ramat Gan | (Israel) | July 2007 | June 2009 | 91 | 35 | 25 | 31 | 38.46 |
| Total | | | | 91 | 35 | 25 | 31 | 38.46 |
