= Alroey Cohen =

Israeli footballer

Alroey Cohen אלרואי כהן
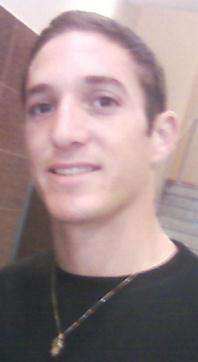

Personal information
- Full name: Alroey Cohen
- Date of birth: January 7, 1989 (age 37)
- Place of birth: Katzrin, Golan Heights
- Positions: Striker; winger

Youth career
- Beitar Nes Tubruk
- Ironi Kiryat Shmona

Senior career*
Years	Team	Apps	(Gls)
2008–2011	Ironi Kiryat Shmona	48	(12)
2011–2013	Hapoel Tel Aviv	62	(6)
2013–2014	Maccabi Petah Tikva	7	(0)

International career^{‡}
2010	Israel U-21	6	(0)
2010	Israel	4	(0)
- * Club domestic league appearances and goals ‡ National team caps and goals as of 12 October 2010

Alroey Cohen (Hebrew: אלרואי כהן) is an Israeli former footballer who last played for Maccabi Petah Tikva.

== Club career statistics ==
(correct as of November 2010)

Club	Season	League		Cup		Toto Cup		Total	
Club	Season	Apps	Goals	Apps	Goals	Apps	Goals	Apps	Goals
Ironi Kiryat Shmona	2008–09	0	0	0	0	2	0	2	0
Ironi Kiryat Shmona	2009–10	31	5	2	0	4	0	37	5
Ironi Kiryat Shmona	2010–11	17	7	0	0	3	1	20	8
Hapoel Tel Aviv	2010–11	13	0	0	0	0	0	0	0
Hapoel Tel Aviv	2011–12	12	3	0	0	0	0	0	0
Career		56	11	2	0	9	1	67	13

== Honours ==
- Liga Leumit (1):
  - 2009–10
- Israel State Cup (2):
  - 2011, 2012
