= Guy Salem =

Israeli footballer (born 1984)

Personal information
- Full name: Guy Salem
- Date of birth: August 23, 1984 (age 42)
- Place of birth: Yavne, Israel
- Position: Goalkeeper

Senior career*
Years	Team	Apps	(Gls)
2003–2006	Hapoel Tel Aviv	0	(0)
2006–2008	Hapoel Marmorek	59	(0)
2008	Maccabi Be'er Sheva	11	(0)
2009	Hapoel Umm al-Fahm	12	(0)
2009–2010	Maccabi Yavne	29	(0)
2010–2013	Maccabi Netanya	5	(0)
2013	→ Maccabi Yavne (loan)	11	(0)
2013–2015	Maccabi Yavne	85	(0)
2015–2016	Beitar Tel Aviv Ramla	2	(0)
2016	Hapoel Jerusalem	14	(0)
2016–2018	F.C. Kafr Qasim	63	(0)
2018–2019	Hapoel Baqa al-Gharbiyye	32	(0)
2019–2021	Hapoel Ashdod	7	(0)
- * Club domestic league appearances and goals as of 1 June 2019

Guy Salem (Hebrew: גיא סאלם; born 23 August 1984) is a former Israeli footballer.
