= Israel Weiss =

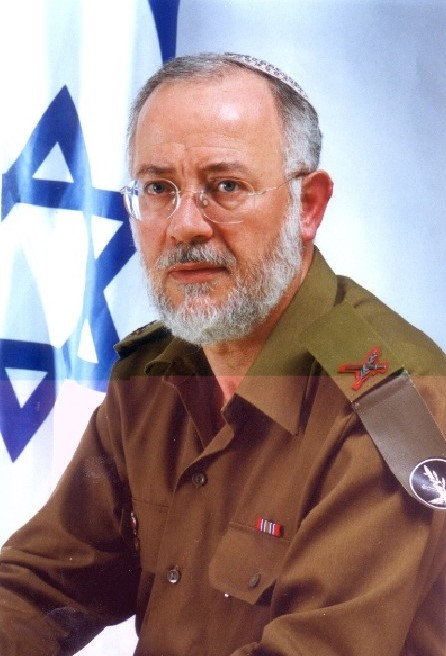
Israel Weiss

Israel Weiss (Hebrew: ישראל וייס; born 1949) was the Chief Military Rabbi of the Israel Defense Forces serving in the position between 2000 and 2006, with a rank of Brigadier General. His predecessor in that position was Rabbi Gad Navon.

== Biography ==
Israel Weiss was born in Czechoslovakia. He studied at Mercaz HaRav in Jerusalem, and views Rabbi Avraham Shapira as his mentor. Weiss was ordained in the Harry Fischel Institute for Talmudic Research.

== Rabbinic career ==
In 1976, he was drafted into the Military Rabbinate and served as a battalion rabbi, a brigade rabbi, a division rabbi, and the rabbi of GOC Army Headquarters. In 2000, Weiss was nominated to the position after Rabbi Gad Navon stepped down.

Weiss was present at the 2008 Israel–Hezbollah prisoner exchange and remarked of the bodies that Hezbollah released: "the verification process yesterday was very slow, because, if we thought the enemy was cruel to the living and the dead, we were surprised, when we opened the caskets, to discover just how cruel. And I'll leave it at that."

== Published works ==
In 2010, Weiss released a book named Bedam Libi (lit., "In the Blood of my Heart") about the Military Rabbinate and his time serving in the army. He related that during the 2005 Israel's unilateral disengagement plan, Prime Minister Ariel Sharon lied to him to get his support. “I asked [Sharon], 'Why uproot those communities?' and he told me, 'Rabbi Weiss, I understand defense, right? I promise the people of Israel 40 years of peace.' Today I know that he lied to me.” Weiss expressed regret over his role in the disengagement, but he did not blame himself or others for having supported the plan. “We must measure things according to how they looked at that time." He also accused then Chief of Staff Dan Halutz of dishonesty, as Halutz fired Rabbi Weiss two days after dismissing rumors that he was about to replace him.
