= 2010–11 Israel State Cup =

Tournament details
- Country: Israel

Final positions
- Champions: Hapoel Tel Aviv (14th title)
- Runners-up: Maccabi Haifa

The 2010–11 Israel State Cup (Hebrew: גביע המדינה, Gvia HaMedina) was the 72nd season of Israel's nationwide football cup competition and the 57th after the Israeli Declaration of Independence. It began on 3 September 2010, while the final was held in Ramat Gan Stadium on 25 May 2011.

The competition was won by Hapoel Tel Aviv, who had beaten Maccabi Haifa in the final.

By winning, Hapoel Tel Aviv qualified for the 2011–12 UEFA Europa League, entering in the third qualifying round.

== Calendar ==
Round	Date
First Round	September 3 to 6, 2010
Second Round	September 14 to 21, 2010
Third Round	September 24 to 29, 2010
Fourth Round	October 19, 2010
Fifth Round	September 24 and 25, 2010
Sixth Round	December 3 to 13, 2010
Seventh Round	January 4, 2011
Eighth Round	February 1 and 2, 2011
Round of 16	March 1 and 2, 2011
Quarter-finals	April 19 and 20, 2011
Semi-finals	May 11, 2011
Final	May 25, 2011

== Results ==
=== Seventh Round ===
The 16 winners from the previous round of the competition join the 16 Liga Leumit clubs in this stage of the competition. These matches were played on 4 January 2011.

Home team	Score	Away team
F.C. Karmiel Safed	3–4 (aet)	Hapoel Jerusalem
Maccabi Tamra	2–0	Maccabi Jaffa
Maccabi Umm Al Fahm	0–2	Maccabi Ironi Jatt
Maccabi Ironi Kiryat Ata	0–0 (aet, p. 5–4)	Ahva Arraba
Hapoel Afula	0–0 (aet, p. 5–4)	Maccabi Yavne
Maccabi Daliyat al-Karmel	4–2	Maccabi Ma'alot Tarshiha
Bnei Eilat	1–3 (aet)	Hapoel Rishon LeZion
Maccabi Kfar Yona	0–1	Maccabi Ahi Nazareth
Hapoel Herzliya	0–3	Maccabi Be'er Sheva
Beitar Shimshon Tel Aviv	0–3	Sektzia Nes Tziona
Hapoel Kfar Saba	3–0	Hapoel Bnei Lod
Hakoah Amidar Ramat Gan	3–0	Hapoel Kafr Kanna
Hapoel Ra'anana	4–1	Beitar Kfar Saba Shlomi
Maccabi Ironi Bat Yam	2–1	Maccabi Amishav Petah Tikva
Maccabi Herzliya	2–1	Hapoel Nazareth Illit
Ironi Nir Ramat HaSharon	1–2	Maccabi Ironi Netivot

=== Eighth Round ===
The 16 winners from the previous round of the competition join the 16 clubs from the Israeli Premier League in this stage of the competition. These matches were played on 1–2 February 2011.

Home team	Score	Away team
Hapoel Afula	1–4	Hapoel Be'er Sheva
Maccabi Netanya	4–1	Bnei Yehuda
Hapoel Ashkelon	1–0	Maccabi Ironi Bat Yam
Maccabi Herzliya	2–0	Maccabi Tamra
Hakoah Amidar Ramat Gan	0–2 (aet)	Hapoel Ra'anana
Hapoel Jerusalem	2–0	Maccabi Be'er Sheva
Hapoel Acre	0–2	Maccabi Ironi Jatt
Sektzia Nes Tziona	1–0	Maccabi Ironi Netivot
Hapoel Petah Tikva	3–1	Maccabi Tel Aviv
Maccabi Ironi Kiryat Ata	0–7	Hapoel Tel Aviv
Hapoel Kfar Saba	0–3	Maccabi Haifa
Hapoel Haifa	2–0 (aet)	Maccabi Daliyat al-Karmel
Hapoel Rishon LeZion	3–1	Bnei Sakhnin
Ironi Kiryat Shmona	1–0	Maccabi Ahi Nazareth
Maccabi Petah Tikva	0–1	F.C. Ashdod
Hapoel Ramat Gan	0–1	Beitar Jerusalem

=== Round of 16 to the Final ===
Games were played from March 1 to May 25, 2011.

Round of 16
March 1, 2011
Maccabi Netanya	1
Hapoel Petah Tikva	0
March 1, 2011
Maccabi Herzliya	0
F.C. Ashdod	2
March 1, 2011
Sektzia Nes Tziona	1
Hapoel Haifa	3 (aet)
March 1, 2011
Maccabi Haifa	2
Hapoel Jerusalem	1
March 2, 2011
Hapoel Tel Aviv	2
Hapoel Ashkelon	1
March 2, 2011
Beitar Jerusalem	2
Hapoel Rishon LeZion	0
March 1, 2011
Hapoel Ra'anana	3
Maccabi Ironi Jatt	0
March 1, 2011
Ironi Kiryat Shmona	4
Hapoel Be'er Sheva	0

Quarter-finals
April 20, 2011
Maccabi Netanya	1 (4)
F.C. Ashdod	1 (1)
April 20, 2011
Hapoel Haifa	1
Maccabi Haifa	3
April 19, 2011
Hapoel Tel Aviv	1
Beitar Jerusalem	0
April 20, 2011
Hapoel Ra'anana	0
Ironi Kiryat Shmona	2

Semi-finals
May 11, 2011
Maccabi Netanya	2
Maccabi Haifa	3
May 11, 2011
Hapoel Tel Aviv	2
Ironi Kiryat Shmona	0

Final
May 25, 2011
Maccabi Haifa	0
Hapoel Tel Aviv	1

==== Round of 16 ====
The 16 winners of the previous round entered this stage of the competition. These matches took place on 1–2 March 2011.

Home team	Score	Away team
Maccabi Netanya	1–0	Hapoel Petah Tikva
Sektzia Nes Tziona	1–3 (aet)	Hapoel Haifa
Beitar Jerusalem	2–0	Hapoel Rishon LeZion
Maccabi Herzliya	0–2	F.C. Ashdod
Ironi Kiryat Shmona	4–0	Hapoel Be'er Sheva
Maccabi Haifa	2–1	Hapoel Jerusalem
Hapoel Ra'anana	3–0	Maccabi Ironi Jatt
Hapoel Tel Aviv	2–1	Hapoel Ashkelon

==== Quarter-finals ====
The draw took place on 3 March 2011. The 8 winners of the previous round entered this stage of the competition. These matches took place on 19–20 April 2011.

Home team	Score	Away team
Hapoel Tel Aviv	1–0	Beitar Jerusalem
Hapoel Haifa	1–3	Maccabi Haifa
Maccabi Netanya	1–1 (aet, p. 4–1)	F.C. Ashdod
Hapoel Ra'anana	0–1	Ironi Kiryat Shmona

==== Semi-finals ====
The draw took place on 26 April 2011. The 4 winners of the previous round entered this stage of the competition. These matches took place on 11 May 2011 in Ramat Gan Stadium.

Home team	Score	Away team
Maccabi Netanya	2–3	Maccabi Haifa
Hapoel Tel Aviv	2–0	Ironi Kiryat Shmona

==== Final ====
May 25, 2011
20:30 UTC+3

Maccabi Haifa	0 – 1	Hapoel Tel Aviv
		2' Tuama

Ramat Gan Stadium, Ramat Gan
Attendance: 40,000
Referee: Meir Levi
