= Rehavia Rosenbaum =

Israeli footballer and coach

Personal information
- Full name: Rehavia Rosenbaum (Hebrew: רחביה רוזנבוים)
- Date of birth: April 29, 1934 (age 92)
- Place of birth: Tel Aviv, Israel
- Position: Forward

Youth career
- 1947–1949: Gadna Yehuda
- 1949–1951: Hapoel Tel Aviv

Senior career*
Years	Team	Apps	(Gls)
1951–1965	Hapoel Tel Aviv	?	(78)

International career
1953–1962	Israel	18	(0)

Managerial career
- 1964–1965: Hapoel Kfar Shalem
- 1965–1968: Hapoel Tel Aviv (youth)
- 1968–1970: Hapoel Tel Aviv
- 1970–1972: Hapoel Kfar Saba
- 1972–1973: Hapoel Petah Tikva
- 1983–1975: Maccabi Jaffa
- 1976–1977: Hapoel Tel Aviv
Medal record
Men's football
Representing Israel
AFC Asian Cup
Runner-up	1956 Hong Kong
- * Club domestic league appearances and goals

Rehavia Rosenbaum (Hebrew: רחביה רוזנבוים; born 29 April 1934) is a former Israeli football player and coach, mainly identified with Hapoel Tel Aviv

== Playing career ==
Rosenbaum began playing football at the age of 13 for the Gadna Yehuda youth team. Two years later, he joined Hapoel Tel Aviv's youth team, which won the league championship in 1951. In 1951, he was promoted to the senior team of the club. He scored his first goal for the team against Maccabi Rishon LeZion on 5 January 1952.

During his time at Hapoel Tel Aviv, the club won their first championship since the 1948 Arab–Israeli War, in 1957. In the 1957 season, Rosenbaum scored 9 goals, including two in a derby against Maccabi Tel Aviv, which was won 4-2 by Hapoel. In 1961, he was part of the team that won the Israel State Cup, beating then-champions Hapoel Petah Tikva in the final.

On 12 October 1962, Rosenbaum served as the team captain in a match against Shimshon Tel Aviv. The match was the first match ever played in the Bloomfield Stadium. He also served as captain in the official inaugural match of the studio on 2 December 1962, against Dutch side FC Twente.

Rosenbaum retired from playing football in 1965, having scored 78 league goals during his tenure, the fourth greatest number of league goals ever scored by a Hapoel Tel Aviv player.

=== Israel National Team ===
On 8 November 1953, while only 19 years old, Rosenbaum made his debut for the Israel national team, in a match against Yugoslavia, during the 1954 FIFA World Cup qualification. Rosenbaum further competed in the 1956 AFC Asian Cup, recording a total of 18 appearances for his national team, the last being a friendly against Turkey on 25 November 1962.

== Coaching career ==
Rosenbaum was appointed coach of the Hapoel Tel Aviv youth team in 1965, and subsequently led it to the youth championship, with the young football player Ronnie Calderon starring the team under his coaching. After two years in the youth team, Rosenbaum was appointed head coach of Hapoel Tel Aviv. In his first season as head coach of the senior team, he led the senior team to the championship as well, with Calderon, Shiye Feigenbaum, Yehezkel Chazom and George Borba starring the team. In his second season as coach of the team they reached the AFC Champions League final, finishing second in the tournament.

After two years as head coach of Hapoel Tel Aviv, Rosenbaum left his position and coached various teams, including Hapoel Kfar Saba, which won a game 4–0 against Hapoel Tel Aviv under his coaching, and then Hapoel Petah Tikva, from which he was fired in 1973 when the team was in danger of relegation, eight rounds from the end of the season. In 1976 he returned to Hapoel Tel Aviv and coached another season, which ended disappointingly as the team finished tenth. Afterward Rosenbaum managed the Hapoel Tel Aviv youth team for many years.

== Honours ==
Israel

- AFC Asian Cup: Runner-up, 1956
