= Shay Abutbul =

Israeli footballer

Shay Abutbul שי אבוטבול
Personal information
- Full name: Shay Abutbul
- Date of birth: January 16, 1983 (age 43)
- Place of birth: Bat Yam, Israel
- Height: 1.80 m (5 ft 11 in)
- Position: Central midfielder

Youth career
- 1999–2002: Hapoel Tel Aviv

Senior career*
Years	Team	Apps	(Gls)
2002–2015	Hapoel Tel Aviv	236	(18)
2015–2016	Maccabi Sha'arayim	12	(0)

International career
2001	Israel U19	6	(1)
2003–2005	Israel U21	17	(3)
- * Club domestic league appearances and goals as of 1 June 2013

Shay Abutbul (Hebrew: שי אבוטבול; born 16 January 1983) is an Israeli former football player.

== Career ==
Shay Abutbul began his career in the youth ranks of top Israeli side Hapoel Tel Aviv. After impressing with the youth side, Shay was called up to the first team in 2002. Since then Abutbul has been one of the top players for the club. During his time with Hapoel he has helped the club capture the Israeli Cup on two occasions and qualify for the UEFA Cup. During the 2008/08 season Shay appeared in 20 league matches scoring 3 goals, he also appeared in 6 UEFA Cup matches scoring 1 goal. It was reported that he has an offer from New York Red Bulls from the MLS.

== International ==
Abutbul has represented Israel at the Under 19 and Under 21 level. He also served as captain of the under 21 side.

== Honours ==
- Israeli Cup (5):
  - 2006, 2007, 2010, 2011, 2012
- Israeli Premier League (1):
  - 2009–10

== Personal life ==
Shay married his girlfriend Keren in May 2005. They have four children.
