= Tom Almadon =

American-Israeli footballer

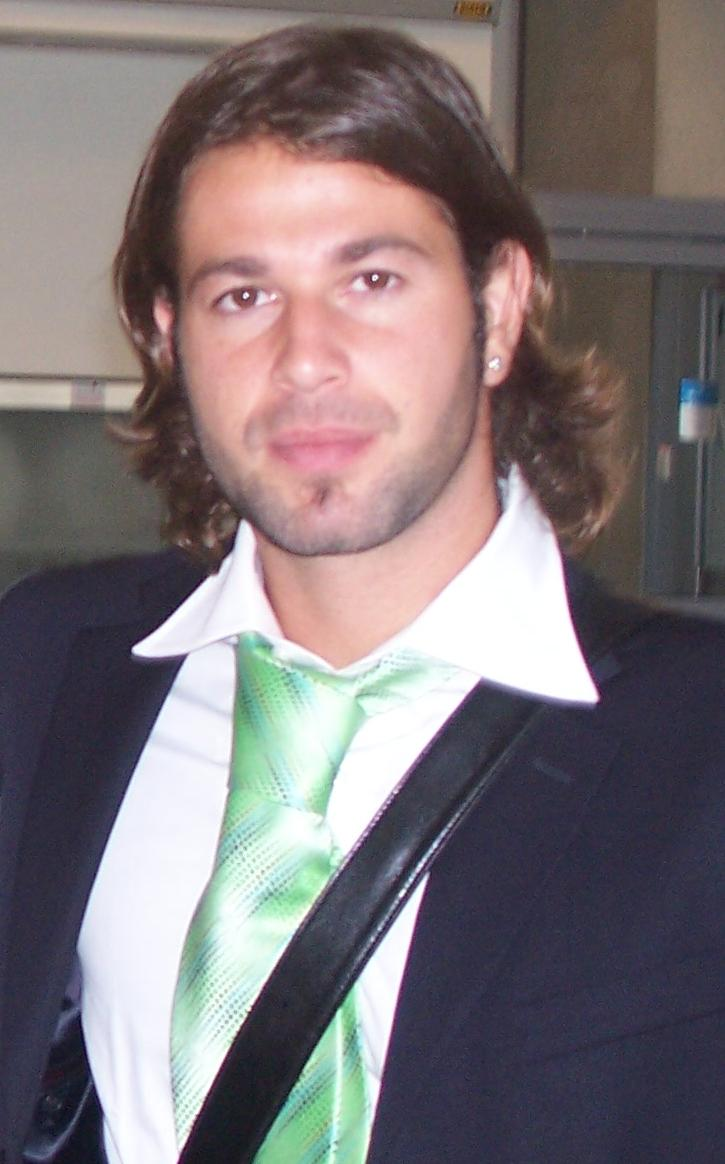

Personal information
- Date of birth: November 30, 1984 (age 41)
- Place of birth: New York City, New York, U.S.
- Height: 1.85 m (6 ft 1 in)
- Position: Goalkeeper

Team information
- Current team: Maccabi Tamra

Youth career
- 1998–2002: Maccabi Haifa

Senior career*
| Years | Team | Apps | (Gls) |
| 2002–2011 | Maccabi Haifa | 26 | (0) |
| 2007–2008 | → Hapoel Nazareth Illit (loan) | 15 | (0) |
| 2008–2009 | → Maccabi Akhi Nazareth (loan) | 32 | (0) |
| 2010 | → Hakoah Amidar Ramat Gan (loan) | 2 | (0) |
| 2011 | → Maccabi Akhi Nazareth (loan) | 11 | (0) |
| 2011–2014 | Bnei Yehuda Tel Aviv | 2 | (0) |
| 2014–2015 | Hapoel Tel Aviv | 4 | (0) |
| 2015–2016 | Hapoel Rishon LeZion | 21 | (0) |
| 2016 | Tzeirei Kafr Kanna | 7 | (0) |
| 2016–2018 | Maccabi Tzur Shalom | 41 | (0) |
| 2019 | Hapoel Acre | 0 | (0) |
| 2019–2020 | Maccabi Tamra | 1 | (0) |

International career^{‡}
| 2000–2001 | Israel U17 | 4 | (0) |
| 2002–2003 | Israel U19 | 5 | (0) |
| 2004–2007 | Israel U21 | 29 | (0) |
- * Club domestic league appearances and goals ‡ National team caps and goals as of (UTC).

Tom Almadon (Hebrew: תום אלמדון; born November 30, 1984) is a former American-Israeli footballer.

He plays for Maccabi Akhi Nazareth and was the goalkeeper for the Israel national under-21 football team. A product of Maccabi Haifa youth department, he has been reserve goalkeeper (covering Nir Davidovich) for the senior team for the past three years and appeared once in the UEFA Champions League. He was loaned to Hapoel Nazareth Illit for the 2007–08 season.

== Honours ==
- Israeli Premier League (1):
  - 2004–05
- Toto Cup (1):
  - 2005-06
