= Stephanie Madon =

American professor

- Occupations: Professor; researcher

Academic background
- Education: Master's & PhD in Social Psychology; Rutger's University

Academic work
- Discipline: Psychologist
- Sub-discipline: Forensic & legal
- Institutions: Iowa State; Arizona State

Stephanie Madon is a professor in the School of Interdisciplinary Forensics and faculty member of the Law and Behavioral Sciences program at Arizona State University (ASU). Her early research focused on self-fulfilling prophecies and stereotypes, while her current research focuses on how social processes impact people's judgment and behavior in legal situations such as interrogations and confessions.

== Education ==
Previously, Madon earned her M.S. and PhD in social psychology from Rutgers University. Madon studied under Dr. Lee Jussim for her doctorate, which she completed in 1998. Her dissertation explored how sex, social class and ethnic stereotypes impact person perception.

== Career ==
After receiving her M.S. and PhD in social psychology from Rutgers University, Madon was a professor of psychology at Iowa State University for 23 years. In 2021, Madon received the Cassling Innovation Award from Iowa State University for interdisciplinary collaboration with faculty and students and innovative teaching methods. Once she transitioned to Arizona State University, Stephanie Madon formed a joint psychology and law lab called the MadGuy Lab with Dr. Max Guyll. Additionally, she has served on two subcommittees for the National Institute of Standards and Technology focused on human factors and firearm physics. At Arizona State University, she also teaches courses in research methods and psychology and law. Madon also serves on the editorial board for Law and Human Behavior.

== Research ==
At the beginning of her career, Madon's research focused on perceptions, self-fulfilling prophecies and stereotypes. Following the publication of these works, her research focus shifted towards stigma and ethnic, national, and gender stereotypes more specifically. More recently, Madon's research has explored narcissism, self-affirmation, and plea decision making. Currently, her research focuses on why suspects confess when faced with police pressure and forensic analysis of fired cartridges.

== Funding ==
Stephanie Madon's research has been funded by the National Science Foundation, National Institute of Justice, and the Society for the Psychological Study of Social Issues. She is currently a fellow of the American Psychology-Law Society, Society of Experimental Social Psychology, Association for Psychological Science, Society for Personality and Social Psychology, and the American Psychological Association. Presently, Madon has two grants from the National Science Foundation which are contributing to "The validity of cartridge case comparison conclusions under field-based conditions" and "Assessing the validity of forensic decisions through interrater reliability".
