= 2017–18 Liga Gimel =

Liga Gimel
- Season: 2017–18

The 2017–18 Liga Gimel season was the 50th season of fifth tier football in Israel, with 105 clubs competing in 8 regional divisions for promotion to Liga Bet.

== Changes from last season ==
=== Team changes ===
==== Promotion and relegation ====
League	Promoted to League	Relegated from League
To/from Liga Bet	Bnei HaGolan VeHaGalil; Maccabi Nujeidat; Maccabi Bnei Reineh; Hapoel Bnei Fureidis; Shimshon Kafr Qasim; Ironi Beit Dagan; A.S. Ashdod; Hapoel Yeruham	Beitar Haifa; Maccabi Sektzia Ma'alot-Tarshiha; Maccabi Ironi Yafa; Beitar Kafr Kanna; Beitar Ramat Gan; Maccabi Ironi Kfar Yona; Beitar Yavne; Maccabi Segev Shalom (folded)

- To replace the folded Hapoel F.C. Karmiel Safed, Tzeirei Tamra was promoted from Liga Gimel, as the best second-placed team in the northern divisions.
- In December 2016, the IFA was ordered to demote Maccabi Umm al-Fahm to Liga Gimel by FIFA due to an unpaid debt. The club, which finished 11th in North B division was demoted at the end of the season and was replaced initially by Maccabi Ironi Tamra, the second best second-placed team in the northern divisions of Liga Gimel. However, an appeal was lodged by Beitar Pardes Hanna, which was the best second-placed team in the Liga Gimel division which promote to North B division, claiming that only teams from the Jezre'el and Samaria division should be considered for promotion as replacement to Maccabi Umm al-Fahm. The IFA Supreme Court accepted the appeal and Promoted Beitar Pardes Hanna to Liga Bet.

=== Format changes ===
- The IFA introduced promotion/relegations playoffs between Liga Bet and Liga Gimel. As a result, The two clubs placed 2nd and 3rd in each Liga Gimel division will qualify for the promotion play-offs. In each pair of divisions (Upper Galilee and Lower Galilee, Jezreel and Samaria, Sharon and Tel Aviv and Central and South) The 2nd placed club will host the 3rd placed club in each division, followed by a match between the two winners to decide the relegation/promotion match against the losing team from the Liga Bet relegation play-offs for a spot in Liga Bet.
- To clarify the order of promotion for filling vacant places in Liga Bet, the IFA announced that the first club to be promoted if such vacancy would be created, for each Liga Bet division only clubs from its corresponding Liga Gimel divisions would be eligible for promotion (Upper Galilee and Lower Galilee to North A division, Jezreel and Samaria to North B division, etc.). The losing club in the third round of the play-offs would be first to be promoted, followed by points-per-match average in the league.

== Upper Galilee (North A) Division ==
Liga Gimel Upper Galilee
- Season: 2017–18
- Champions: Maccabi Ahva Yarka
- Matches played: 116
- Goals scored: 514 (4.43 per match)
- Top goalscorer: Fadi Badarne (Maccabi Ahva Yarka) (25)

Pos	Team	Pld	W	D	L	GF	GA	GD	Pts	Qualification or relegation
1	Maccabi Ahva Yarka	20	16	4	0	75	20	+55	52	Promotion to Liga Bet
2	Maccabi Ahva Sha'ab	20	15	4	1	53	16	+37	49	Promotion Playoffs
3	Hapoel Bnei Tuba-Zangariyye	20	14	3	3	60	22	+38	45	Promotion Playoffs
4	Bnei Bir al-Maksur	20	11	4	5	50	25	+25	37	
5	F.C. Hatzor HaGlilit	20	9	5	6	39	29	+10	32	
6	Tzeirei Sakhnin	20	8	3	9	46	32	+14	27	
7	Hapoel Nahariya	20	6	4	10	40	46	−6	22	
8	Hapoel Bnei Hurfeish	20	5	2	13	35	59	−24	17 (Note: Hapoel Bnei Hurfeish wins head-to-head against Hapoel Bnei Dear al-Asad (2–3; 5–1))	
9	Hapoel Deir al-Asad	20	5	2	13	24	78	−54	17	
10	Maccabi Katzrin Golan	20	4	1	15	30	54	−24	13	
11	Hapoel Tarshiha	20	0	2	18	24	95	−71	2	
12	Maccabi Tzeirei Bi'ina (Note: Maccabi Zeirei Bi'ina folded on 28 December 2017. Its results were annulled.)	0	0	0	0	0	0	0	0	Folded
13	Hapoel Bnei Bi'ina (Note: Hapoel Bnei Bi'ina registered to play in Liga Gimel, but withdrew before league matches began.)	0	0	0	0	0	0	0	0	Folded

Updated to match(es) played on 11 April 2018. Source: Liga Gimel Upper Galilee IFA (in Hebrew)
Rules for classification: 1) points; 2) number of wins; 3) head-to-head; 4) deciding match.

=== Results ===
Home \ Away	BBM	HAZ	HBH	BTZ	DEA	HNH	HTR	MAS	MAY	MKG	MZB	ZSK
Bnei Bir al-Maksur	—	2–0	4–1	0–3	6–1	7–0	6–0	0–3	1–2	3–2	4–1	0–0
F.C. Hatzor HaGlilit	3–2	—	3–2	1–4	2–0	0–0	4–0	1–1	1–2	4–1	3–0	1–0
Hapoel Bnei Hurfeish	1–2	2–2	—	1–1	2–3	2–1	5–3	1–5	2–5	0–3	–	0–4
Hapoel Bnei Tuba-Zangariyye	4–0	1–1	3–0	—	4–1	3–1	6–1	1–5	1–4	5–1	–	5–0
Hapoel Deir al-Asad	0–3	1–7	1–5	0–3	—	1–8	5–1	1–2	0–5	2–1	0–2	2–1
Hapoel Nahariya	2–2	3–3	4–3	1–4	1–3	—	3–0	0–2	1–2	5–1	7–0	3–2
Hapoel Tarshiha	0–4	0–2	0–3	1–6	2–2	2–4	—	2–5	1–2	1–3	4–1	2–4
Maccabi Ahva Sha'ab	0–2	1–0	4–1	2–1	7–0	1–1	5–0	—	1–1	3–2	–	1–0
Maccabi Ahva Yarka	2–2	5–1	4–0	1–1	10–1	4–1	13–1	1–1	—	5–1	0–3	2–0
Maccabi Katzrin Golan	0–3	0–2	2–4	0–2	0–0	2–1	7–1	1–3	1–2	—	–	0–3
Maccabi Tzeirei Bi'ina	–	–	–	0–3	–	–	–	0–3	–	0–3	—	–
Tzeirei Sakhnin	1–1	2–1	5–0	1–2	8–0	2–0	6–6	0–1	2–3	5–2	5–1	—

Updated to match(es) played on 11 April 2018. Source: Liga Gimel Upper Galilee IFA (in Hebrew)
Legend: Blue = home team win; Red = away team win.

=== Positions by round ===
Team \ Round	1	2	3	4	5	6	7	8	9	10	11	12	13	14	15	16	17	18	19	20	21	22
Maccabi Ahva Yarka	1	3	2	3	3	2	2	1	1	1	1	1	1	1	1	1	1	1	1	1	1	1
Maccabi Ahva Sha'ab	6	9	11	7	8	8	5	6	4	4	3	3	3	2	2	2	2	2	2	2	2	2
Hapoel Bnei Tuba-Zangariyye	4	1	1	1	1	1	1	2	2	2	2	2	2	3	3	3	3	3	3	3	3	3
Bnei Bir al-Maksur	3	6	4	5	7	6	6	5	5	6	5	5	4	4	4	4	4	4	4	4	4	4
F.C. Hatzor HaGlilit	6	4	3	4	4	4	3	3	3	3	4	4	6	6	6	6	6	5	5	5	5	5
Tzeirei Sakhnin	8	5	6	8	9	9	8	7	7	7	7	7	5	5	5	5	5	6	6	6	6	6
Hapoel Nahariya	9	10	12	12	12	12	12	12	10	10	10	10	9	9	9	9	9	9	9	9	7	7
Hapoel Bnei Hurfeish	10	8	8	9	6	7	9	9	9	8	8	8	8	8	7	7	7	7	7	7	8	8
Hapoel Deir al-Asad	5	2	5	2	2	3	4	4	6	5	6	6	7	7	8	8	8	8	8	8	9	9
Maccabi Katzrin Golan	12	11	10	6	7	5	7	8	8	9	9	9	10	10	10	10	10	10	10	10	10	10
Hapoel Tarshiha	2	7	7	10	10	11	10	10	11	11	11	11	11	11	11	11	11	11	11	11	11	11
Maccabi Tzeirei Bi'ina	11	12	9	11	11	10	11	11	12	-	-	-	-	-	-	-	-	-	-	-	-	-

Source: Liga Gimel Upper Galilee IFA (in Hebrew)

== Lower Galilee (North B) Division ==
Liga Gimel Lower Galilee
- Season: 2017–18
- Champions: Maccabi Ironi Tamra
- Matches played: 107
- Goals scored: 530 (4.95 per match)
- Top goalscorer: Taha Zubidat (Maccabi Ironi Tamra) (33)

Pos	Team	Pld	W	D	L	GF	GA	GD	Pts	Qualification or relegation
1	Maccabi Ironi Tamra	20	17	2	1	76	11	+65	53	Promotion to Liga Bet
2	Maccabi Kafr Manda	20	14	2	4	63	20	+43	44	Promotion Playoffs
3	Maccabi Ironi Yafa	20	14	5	1	54	20	+34	47 (Note: A match between Maccabi Ironi Yafa and Maccabi Basmat Tab'un was abandoned at the 68th minute due to a brawl between the two teams. The match result was set to 0–0 with no points awarded. Maccabi Yafa also had three points deducted.)	Promotion Playoffs
4	Hapoel Ironi Bnei I'billin	20	9	3	8	47	33	+14	30 (Note: Bnei I'billin wins head-to-head against Tzeirei Ilut and Beitar Kafr Kanna.)	
5	Tzeirei Ilut	20	9	3	8	42	28	+14	30	
6	Beitar Kafr Kanna	20	9	3	8	63	42	+21	30	
7	Hapoel Kiryat Yam	20	9	1	10	30	41	−11	28	
8	Maccabi Basmat Tab'un	20	8	4	8	49	24	+25	28	
9	Maccabi Kiryat Yam	20	5	0	15	39	61	−22	15	
10	Beitar Kiryat Ata	20	4	1	15	38	94	−56	13	
11	Maccabi Tabbash	20	0	0	20	15	142	−127	0	
12	Maccabi Bnei Deir al-Asad (Note: Maccabi Bnei Deir al-Asad failed to appear to three matches and was disqualified.)	0	0	0	0	0	0	0	0	Folded
13	Tzeirei Bir al-Maksur (Note: Tzeirei Bir al-Maksur registered to play in Liga Gimel, but failed to appear to its first three matches and was disqualified.)	0	0	0	0	0	0	0	0	Folded
14	F.C. Kfar Kama (Note: F.C. Kfar Kama registered to play in Liga Gimel, but withdrew before league matches began.)	0	0	0	0	0	0	0	0	Folded

Updated to match(es) played on 7 April 2018. Source: Liga Gimel Lower Galilee IFA (in Hebrew)
Rules for classification: 1) points; 2) number of wins; 3) head-to-head; 4) deciding match.

=== Results ===
Home \ Away	BKK	BKA	IBI	HKY	MBT	BDA	MIT	MIY	MKM	MKY	TBS	TZI
Beitar Kafr Kanna	—	4–3	1–4	6–0	3–2	–	1–4	3–3	1–1	3–1	15–1	0–1
Beitar Kiryat Ata	3–9	—	1–9	0–3	2–10	–	1–3	1–4	1–2	4–6	12–4	0–3
Hapoel Ironi Bnei I'billin	4–2	1–4	—	3–0	0–0	–	0–1	1–3	1–2	4–3	4–0	1–1
Hapoel Kiryat Yam	3–1	0–0	0–3	—	2–0	3–0	2–7	0–3 (Note: The match was abandoned at the 28th minute at the request of the police, with Hapoel Kiryat Yam leading 2–0. The match was awarded to Yafa.)	0–5	1–0	6–0	0–3
Maccabi Basmat Tab'un	4–1	5–0	3–0	0–3	—	–	0–4	0–1	0–2	5–0	3–1	1–1
Maccabi Bnei Deir al-Asad	1–8	0–3	–	–	0–3	—	–	–	–	0–3	–	–
Maccabi Ironi Tamra	2–0	11–0	2–0	3–0	1–0	–	—	2–2	2–0	5–1	6–0	4–2
Maccabi Ironi Yafa	0–0	6–0	6–3	1–0	0–0 (Note: The match between Maccabi Ironi Yafa and Maccabi Basmat Tab'un was abandoned at the 68th minute due to a brawl between the two teams with Maccabi Basmat Tab'un leading 1–0. The match result was set to 0–0 with no points awarded.)	12–1	0–0	—	3–2	5–2	4–0	1–2
Maccabi Kafr Manda	3–1	7–1	1–0	3–0	1–1	–	2–1	3–5	—	5–1	8–0	1–0
Maccabi Kiryat Yam	1–3	1–2	1–3	1–4	0–3	–	0–5	1–2	2–1	—	7–1	2–1
Maccabi Tabbash	1–7	0–3	1–5	2–4	0–11	–	0–9	0–3	0–10	2–9	—	2–11
Tzeirei Ilut	1–2	6–0	1–1	0–2	2–1	10–0	0–4	0–2	0–4	2–0	5–0	—

Updated to match(es) played on 7 April 2018. Source: Liga Gimel Lower Galilee IFA (in Hebrew)
Legend: Blue = home team win; Red = away team win.

=== Positions by round ===
Team \ Round	1	2	3	4	5	6	7	8	9	10	11	12	13	14	15	16	17	18	19	20	21	22	23	24	25	26
Maccabi Ironi Tamra	4	1	4	2	3	1	1	1	1	1	1	2	1	1	1	1	1	1	1	1	1	1	1	1	1	1
Maccabi Kafr Manda	8	8	2	1	1	2	3	2	2	2	3	3	3	3	3	3	2	2	2	2	2	2	2	2	2	2
Maccabi Ironi Yafa	6	10	5	4	4	4	2	3	3	3	2	1	2	2	2	2	3	3	3	3	3	3	3	3	3	3
Hapoel Ironi Bnei I'billin	1	3	3	6	6	5	6	4	4	4	4	6	7	5	6	4	4	4	4	4	4	4	4	4	4	4
Tzeirei Ilut	5	2	1	3	2	3	4	5	6	5	5	4	4	4	4	5	6	6	6	5	7	5	5	5	6	5
Beitar Kafr Kanna	6	9	9	8	5	7	8	9	8	8	7	8	8	8	8	8	8	8	8	8	8	8	8	8	8	6
Hapoel Kiryat Yam	2	4	8	9	8	9	9	8	5	6	6	5	5	6	7	7	7	7	7	7	6	7	6	7	5	7
Maccabi Basmat Tab'un	9	6	7	7	8	6	7	7	7	7	8	7	6	7	5	6	5	5	5	6	5	6	7	6	7	8
Maccabi Kiryat Yam	2	4	10	10	10	10	10	10	10	10	10	10	10	10	10	10	10	10	9	10	10	10	10	10	10	9
Beitar Kiryat Ata	10	6	6	5	7	8	5	6	9	9	9	9	9	9	9	9	9	9	10	9	9	9	9	9	9	10
Maccabi Tabbash	13	11	12	12	11	11	11	11	11	11	11	11	11	11	11	11	11	11	11	11	11	11	11	11	11	11
Maccabi Bnei Deir al-Asad	11	12	11	11	12	12	12	-	-	-	-	-	-	-	-	-	-	-	-	-	-	-	-	-	-	-
Tzeirei Bir al-Maksur	11	12	-	-	-	-	-	-	-	-	-	-	-	-	-	-	-	-	-	-	-	-	-	-	-	-

== Jezreel (North C) Division ==
Liga Gimel Jezreel
- Season: 2017–18
- Champions: Hapoel Bnei Musmus
- Matches played: 128
- Goals scored: 541 (4.23 per match)
- Top goalscorer: Ihab Masarwa (Ihud Bnei Baqa) (29)

Pos	Team	Pld	W	D	L	GF	GA	GD	Pts	Qualification or relegation
1	Hapoel Bnei Musmus	22	21	0	1	86	7	+79	63	Promotion to Liga Bet
2	Ihud Bnei Baqa	22	18	3	1	84	17	+67	57	Promotion Playoffs
3	Ahi Bir al-Maksur	22	16	3	3	54	21	+33	51	Promotion Playoffs
4	Bnei Musheirifa Bayada	22	11	3	8	40	25	+15	36	
5	Beitar Ein Mahil	22	9	3	10	37	36	+1	30	
6	Beitar Umm al-Fahm	22	9	2	11	38	49	−11	29	
7	Maccabi Ahi Ar'ara 'Ara	22	8	5	9	47	54	−7	29	
8	Hapoel Ein as-Sahla	22	8	4	10	39	42	−3	28 (Note: Hapoel Ein as-Sahla wins head-to-head against Maccabi Bnei Muqeible on away goals (2–3; 1–0).)	
9	Maccabi Bnei Muqeible	22	8	4	10	34	49	−15	28	
10	Maccabi Umm al-Fahm	22	5	1	16	28	50	−22	16	
11	Hapoel Tzeirei Ka'abiyye	22	1	4	17	35	97	−62	7	
12	Beitar Afula	22	1	2	19	30	105	−75	5	

Updated to match(es) played on 11 April 2018. Source: Liga Gimel Jezreel IFA (in Hebrew)
Rules for classification: 1) points; 2) number of wins; 3) head-to-head; 4) deciding match.

=== Results ===
Home \ Away	ABM	BAF	BEM	BUF	BMB	HBM	HES	HZK	IBB	MAA	MBM	MUF
Ahi Bir al-Maksur	—	3–0	3–0 (Note: The match was abandoned at the 56th minute as Beitar Ein Mahil players left the pitch in protest after an Ein Mahil player was sent off.)	6–1	0–1	0–1	3–2	2–0	1–1	1–0	2–0	2–0
Beitar Afula	3–4	—	0–4	0–4	0–4	0–9	2–3	5–3	2–15	3–5	1–3	2–6
Beitar Ein Mahil	1–2	4–1	—	2–1	3–0	0–2	1–0	5–0	0–2	1–3	3–1	0–2
Beitar Umm al-Fahm	0–1	2–1	1–1	—	3–1	0–5	1–5	8–3	0–3	5–1	0–3	2–1
Bnei Musheirifa Bayada	1–3	3–1	3–1	2–0	—	1–2	5–1	3–0	0–0	3–1	5–0	3–0
Hapoel Bnei Musmus	6–1	6–0	3–0	2–0	1–0	—	3–1	5–0	2–0	4–0	5–0	6–1
Hapoel Ein as-Sahla	0–2	5–3	2–1	0–1	0–0	0–3 (Note: The match was originally won 1–0 by Hapoel Bnei Musmus. Hapoel Ein Sahla fielded an ineliglible player. The result was set to 3–0 to Bnei Musmus.)	—	3–3	0–1	1–1	0–1	1–0
Hapoel Tzeirei Ka'abiyye	1–10	1–1	5–5	4–5	2–1	0–7	3–5	—	0–5	2–4	1–3	1–2
Ihud Bnei Baqa	2–2	6–0	3–0	3–1	2–1	1–0	4–1	5–2	—	10–0	3–0	5–0
Maccabi Ahi Ar'ara 'Ara	1–1	2–2	1–3	4–1	1–2	1–4	2–2	7–2	2–3	—	5–1	3–1
Maccabi Bnei Muqeible	0–3 (Note: The match was originally won 4–2 by Ahi Bir al-Maksur. Bnei Muqeible fielded an ineliglible player and the result was set to 3–0 to Bir al-Maksur.)	6–1	1–1	1–1	3–0	1–5	2–3	2–2	2–6	1–1	—	1–0
Maccabi Umm al-Fahm	0–2	7–2	0–1	0–1	1–1	0–5	0–4	4–0	1–4	1–2	1–2	—

Updated to match(es) played on 11 April 2018. Source: Liga Gimel Jezreel IFA (in Hebrew)
Legend: Blue = home team win; Red = away team win.

=== Positions by round ===
Team \ Round	1	2	3	4	5	6	7	8	9	10	11	12	13	14	15	16	17	18	19	20	21	22
Hapoel Bnei Musmus	4	1	1	1	1	1	1	1	1	1	2	1	1	1	1	1	1	1	1	1	2	1
Ihud Bnei Baqa	6	5	3	2	2	2	2	2	2	2	1	2	2	2	2	2	2	2	2	2	1	2
Ahi Bir al-Maksur	6	8	8	5	4	3	3	3	3	3	3	3	3	3	3	3	3	3	3	3	3	3
Bnei Musheirifa Bayada	1	2	2	3	3	5	5	4	4	4	4	4	4	4	4	4	4	4	4	4	4	4
Beitar Ein Mahil	11	6	5	6	6	6	6	6	5	5	9	8	5	7	5	6	7	7	7	7	7	5
Beitar Umm al-Fahm	3	4	6	7	7	8	8	9	8	7	8	6	8	9	9	8	9	9	9	9	8	6
Maccabi Ahi Ar'ara 'Ara	2	7	7	8	8	7	7	7	7	8	5	7	9	6	8	9	6	5	6	5	5	7
Hapoel Ein as-Sahla	9	10	9	9	9	9	10	8	9	9	6	9	7	5	7	7	8	8	8	8	9	8
Maccabi Bnei Muqeible	4	3	4	4	5	4	4	5	6	6	7	5	6	8	6	5	5	6	5	6	6	9
Maccabi Umm al-Fahm^{1}	9	9	10	11	10	10	9	10	-	-	10	10	10	10	10	10	10	10	10	10	10	10
Hapoel Tzeirei Ka'abiyye	12	11	12	12	12	12	12	12	11	11	12	12	11	11	11	11	11	11	11	11	11	11
Beitar Afula	8	11	11	10	11	11	11	11	10	10	11	11	12	12	12	12	12	12	12	12	12	12

Source: Liga Gimel Jezreel IFA (in Hebrew)

^{1}On 27 December 2017 Maccabi Umm al-Fahm was temporarily expelled from the league after the club had a check bounced and the club failed to rectify the situation within a month. The club was reinstated on 10 January 2018.

== Samaria (North D) Division ==
Liga Gimel Samaria
- Season: 2017–18
- Champions: Tzeirei Ironi Baqa
- Matches played: 152
- Goals scored: 656 (4.32 per match)
- Top goalscorer: Eliyahu Deri (Beitar Haifa) (34)

Pos	Team	Pld	W	D	L	GF	GA	GD	Pts	Qualification or relegation
1	Tzeirei Ironi Baqa	24	19	3	2	81	25	+56	60	Promotion to Liga Bet
2	Beitar Haifa	24	19	2	3	77	23	+54	59	Promotion Playoffs
3	Maccabi Neve Sha'anan	24	17	3	4	69	41	+28	54	Promotion Playoffs
4	F.C. Pardes Hanna-Karkur	24	16	3	5	71	29	+42	51	
5	Hapoel Bnei Jisr az-Zarqa	24	11	4	9	48	42	+6	37 (Note: Hapoel Bnei Jisr az-Zarqa wins head-to-head against Maccabi Ironi Barta'a on away goals (0–0; 4–2).)	
6	Maccabi Ironi Barta'a	24	11	4	9	50	53	−3	37	
7	Hapoel Ironi Or Akiva	24	8	9	7	41	37	+4	33	
8	Maccabi Isfiya	24	9	4	11	56	55	+1	31	
9	Maccabi Ahva Fureidis	24	7	7	10	40	44	−4	28	
10	Hapoel Ahva Haifa	24	7	3	14	46	62	−16	24	
11	Hapoel Kiryat Haim	24	5	2	17	50	89	−39	17	
12	Hapoel Menashe	24	2	1	21	18	83	−65	7	
13	Hapoel Halissa	24	1	3	20	24	88	−64	6	

Updated to match(es) played on 4 April 2018. Source: Liga Gimel Samaria IFA (in Hebrew)
Rules for classification: 1) points; 2) number of wins; 3) head-to-head; 4) deciding match.

=== Results ===
Home \ Away	BHA	PHC	AHA	BJZ	HHA	IOA	HKH	HMN	MAF	MIB	MIS	MNS	ZIB
Beitar Haifa	—	0–1	4–2	4–1	8–1	1–2	4–3	4–0	3–0	4–1	6–2	2–3	1–1
F.C. Pardes Hanna-Karkur	1–4	—	3–0	3–1	3–0	1–0	6–1	6–0	3–1	5–0	4–1	1–2	1–2
Hapoel Ahva Haifa	0–3	2–3	—	1–3	3–2	1–2	2–0	4–1	1–1	2–3	0–3 (Note: The match originally ended with Ahva Haifa winning 4–1. As Ahva fielded an ineligible player, a 3–0 victory was given to Maccabi Isfiya.)	3–7	1–3
Hapoel Bnei Jisr az-Zarqa	0–1	4–4	2–0	—	1–1	3–1	0–2	2–0	3–3	4–2	1–2	2–1	1–5
Hapoel Halissa	0–6	0–3	1–8	1–3	—	1–3	0–3	1–3	1–4	1–3	2–7	0–3 (Note: The match was abandoned at the 70th minute with Maccabi Neve Sha'anan leading 1–0 as a Hapoel Halissa official attacked the referee's assistant. Neve Sha'anan was awarded a 3–0 victory.)	0–5
Hapoel Ironi Or Akiva	2–3	2–2	1–1	2–3	2–1	—	9–4	1–0	2–2	0–0	1–1	1–0	0–1
Hapoel Kiryat Haim	0–3	0–3	2–3	1–4	4–2	3–3	—	8–2	0–1	6–11	2–4	4–4	3–5
Hapoel Menashe	1–5	1–6	0–3	0–4	1–3	1–3	1–0	—	0–0	1–4	0–2	1–2	0–2
Maccabi Ahva Fureidis	0–1	1–1	3–0 (Note: The match was abandoned at the 80th minute with Fureidis leading 1–0, as Ahva Haifa players left the field in protest over sending off of one of their players.)	3–2	2–2	1–1	2–3	2–0	—	0–1	3–0	3–5	0–4
Maccabi Ironi Barta'a	0–4	1–7	2–0	0–0	1–1	3–0	5–0	4–1	2–1	—	1–1	1–3	0–3 (Note: The match originally ended with Ironi Baqa winning 2–0. As Barta'a fielded an underage player, the result was set to 3–0 to Baqa.)
Maccabi Isfiya	1–1	1–3	1–5	0–2	5–2	1–1	8–0	4–1	3–4	3–1	—	1–3	2–3
Maccabi Neve Sha'anan	0–3	1–0	3–3	3–1	3–1	2–1	2–0	5–2	3–2	3–4	6–1	—	3–2
Tzeirei Ironi Baqa	1–2	4–1	9–1	2–1	4–0	1–1	5–1	8–1	3–1	3–0	3–2	2–2	—

Updated to match(es) played on 4 April 2018. Source: Liga Gimel Samaria IFA (in Hebrew)
Legend: Blue = home team win; Red = away team win.

=== Positions by round ===
Team \ Round	1	2	3	4	5	6	7	8	9	10	11	12	13	14	15	16	17	18	19	20	21	22	23	24	25	26
Tzeirei Ironi Baqa	4	2	1	3	2	1	1	1	1	1	1	1	1	1	1	1	1	1	1	1	1	1	1	1	1	1
Beitar Haifa	9	9	7	6	5	6	4	3	3	2	3	3	3	2	2	2	2	2	2	2	2	2	2	2	2	2
Maccabi Neve Sha'anan	3	3	5	1	3	2	2	2	2	3	4	5	4	5	4	3	4	3	3	3	3	3	3	3	3	3
F.C. Pardes Hanna-Karkur	10	10	10	9	9	8	5	5	4	4	2	2	2	3	3	4	3	4	4	4	4	4	4	4	4	4
Hapoel Bnei Jisr az-Zarqa	6	7	8	8	8	9	9	6	5	5	5	4	5	4	5	5	6	6	5	5	5	5	5	5	5	5
Maccabi Ironi Barta'a	6	4	4	5	7	5	7	8	7	7	6	6	6	6	6	6	5	7	6	6	6	6	6	6	6	6
Hapoel Ironi Or Akiva	5	6	6	7	6	7	8	9	9	10	8	8	8	9	8	7	9	9	9	9	9	8	8	7	7	7
Maccabi Isfiya	2	5	3	4	4	4	6	7	8	8	9	9	9	8	9	9	8	8	7	7	7	7	7	8	8	8
Maccabi Ahva Fureidis	8	8	9	10	10	11	10	10	10	9	10	10	10	10	10	10	10	10	10	10	10	10	9	9	9	9
Hapoel Ahva Haifa	1	1	2	2	1	3	3	4	6	6	7	7	7	7	7	8	7	5	8	8	8	9	10	10	10	10
Hapoel Kiryat Haim	12	11	11	11	11	10	11	11	11	11	11	11	12	11	11	11	11	11	11	11	11	11	11	11	11	11
Hapoel Menashe	11	12	12	12	12	13	13	13	13	13	13	12	11	12	12	12	12	12	12	12	12	12	12	12	12	12
Hapoel Halissa	13	13	13	13	13	12	12	12	12	12	12	13	13	13	13	13	13	13	13	13	13	13	13	13	13	13

Source: Liga Gimel Samaria IFA (in Hebrew)

== Sharon (South A) Division ==
Liga Gimel Sharon
- Season: 2017–18
- Champions: Hapoel Kafr Bara
- Matches played: 155
- Goals scored: 579 (3.74 per match)
- Top goalscorer: Gary Shpurkin (Ironi Ariel) (25)

Pos	Team	Pld	W	D	L	GF	GA	GD	Pts	Qualification or relegation
1	Hapoel Kafr Bara	24	18	3	3	66	24	+42	57	Promotion to Liga Bet
2	Bnei Ra'anana	24	17	1	6	73	38	+35	52	Promotion Playoffs
3	Sporting Tel Aviv	24	14	7	3	59	28	+31	49	Promotion Playoffs
4	Ironi Ariel	24	14	3	7	66	34	+32	45	
5	Maccabi HaSharon Netanya	24	12	5	7	43	25	+18	41	
6	Hapoel Jaljulia	24	12	4	8	43	49	−6	40	
7	Hapoel Oranit	24	9	5	10	45	38	+7	32	
8	Maccabi Ironi Kfar Yona	24	8	3	13	49	49	0	27 (Note: Maccabi Kfar Yona and Tzeirei Tira finished equal on head-to-head (1–2; 2–1). Maccabi Kfar Yona was placed 8th on goal difference.)	
9	Tzeirei Tira	24	8	3	13	33	34	−1	27	
10	F.C. Kafr Qasim Nibrass	24	4	9	11	29	56	−27	21	
11	F.C. Netanya	24	4	7	13	27	51	−24	19	
12	Bnei Qalansawe	24	5	3	16	28	60	−32	18	
13	Beitar Tubruk	24	3	3	18	22	97	−75	12	

Updated to match(es) played on 4 April 2018. Source: Liga Gimel Sharon IFA (in Hebrew)
Rules for classification: 1) points; 2) number of wins; 3) head-to-head; 4) deciding match.

=== Results ===
Home \ Away	BTU	BQL	BRA	KQN	FCN	HJL	HKB	HOR	IAR	MKY	MSN	STA	ZTI
Beitar Tubruk	—	4–3	3–9	1–1	0–3	0–1	1–8	1–1	1–6	0–1	0–2	0–7	0–7
Bnei Qalansawe	2–2	—	3–2	1–2	3–1	1–4	0–4	2–1	3–0	1–3	0–0	0–1	0–1
Bnei Ra'anana	10–1	5–0	—	2–0	4–0	5–1	1–1	2–1	3–1	1–3	2–0	1–4	5–0
F.C. Kafr Qasim Nibrass	3–0	1–1	1–3	—	1–1	2–3	1–1	2–0	3–10	1–1	0–0	4–4	2–1
F.C. Netanya	0–1	3–0	1–2	0–0	—	2–2	1–3	2–2	0–1	0–3	1–2	2–2	2–2
Hapoel Jaljulia	1–0	3–0	2–4	1–0	3–1	—	2–4	0–3	1–1	2–1	2–1	0–5	1–0
Hapoel Kafr Bara	6–0	4–0	5–2	1–0	7–2	2–1	—	2–0	2–1	4–0	0–3	4–0	2–1
Hapoel Oranit	2–5	4–0	4–1	2–1	4–1	3–3	1–0	—	1–2	4–0	0–3	2–3	3–0
Ironi Ariel	7–0	5–1	3–0	2–0 (Note: The match was abandoned at the 56th minute with a 1–1 score, after Ariel were given a penalty and Kafr Qasim players dissented and threatened the referee and Ariel players. The disciplinary tribual ordered the match to be replayed.)	3–1	2–2	5–0	3–4	—	4–1	0–1	1–4	2–1
Maccabi Ironi Kfar Yona	6–1	0–3	2–4	12–0	0–1	3–4	1–3	2–2	1–1	—	0–3	0–1	1–2
Maccabi HaSharon Netanya	1–0	3–2	1–2	5–2	0–0	6–1	0–1	1–1	1–3	4–2	—	2–2	3–1
Sporting Tel Aviv	5–0	5–2	1–2	1–1	6–1	2–1	0–0	1–0	2–1	2–4	1–0	—	0–0
Tzeirei Tira	5–1	2–0	0–1	3–1	0–1	1–2	1–2	1–0	1–2	1–2	2–1	0–0	—

Updated to match(es) played on 4 April 2018. Source: Liga Gimel Sharon IFA (in Hebrew)
Legend: Blue = home team win; Red = away team win.

=== Positions by round ===
Team \ Round	1	2	3	4	5	6	7	8	9	10	11	12	13	14	15	16	17	18	19	20	21	22	23	24	25	26
Hapoel Kafr Bara	6	3	8	5	6	7	6	7	7	6	5	4	4	4	4	4	3	2	1	1	1	2	2	2	1	1
Bnei Ra'anana	4	9	5	8	9	5	4	4	4	2	1	1	1	1	2	2	2	3	2	2	2	1	1	1	2	2
Sporting Tel Aviv	9	7	6	2	4	3	1	3	2	3	2	2	3	3	3	3	4	4	4	3	4	3	3	3	3	3
Ironi Ariel	1	6	3	7	8	10	8	5	5	5	6	6	7	6	6	7	7	7	7	6	6	6	6	5	4	4
Maccabi HaSharon Netanya	5	2	1	4	2	2	2	2	1	1	3	3	2	2	1	1	1	1	3	4	3	4	4	4	5	5
Hapoel Jaljulia	13	11	10	10	11	8	7	8	9	7	7	8	6	7	8	6	6	5	5	5	5	5	5	6	6	6
Hapoel Oranit	2	1	4	1	1	1	3	1	3	4	4	5	5	5	5	5	5	6	6	7	7	7	7	7	7	7
Maccabi Ironi Kfar Yona	12	13	12	12	12	12	12	12	12	12	12	12	12	12	12	12	12	12	12	12	12	10	10	9	9	8
Tzeirei Tira	3	8	9	6	7	9	10	10	11	11	9	9	9	8	7	8	8	8	8	8	8	8	8	8	8	9
F.C. Kafr Qasim Nibrass	6	4	2	3	3	4	5	6	8	9	10	10	10	10	10	11	11	11	10	10	10	9	9	10	10	10
F.C. Netanya	8	5	7	9	5	6	9	9	6	8	8	7	8	9	9	9	9	9	9	9	9	11	11	11	12	11
Bnei Qalansawe	11	10	13	11	10	11	11	11	10	10	11	11	11	11	11	10	10	10	11	11	11	12	12	12	11	12
Beitar Tubruk	10	12	11	13	13	13	13	13	13	13	13	13	13	13	13	13	13	13	13	13	13	13	13	13	13	13

Source: Liga Gimel Sharon IFA (in Hebrew)

== Tel Aviv (South B) Division ==
Liga Gimel Tel Aviv
- Season: 2017–18
- Champions: Beitar Ramat Gan
- Matches played: 239
- Goals scored: 1,194 (5 per match)
- Top goalscorer: Yaniv Avdar (Bnei Yehud) (47)

Pos	Team	Pld	W	D	L	GF	GA	GD	Pts	Qualification or relegation
1	Beitar Ramat Gan	30	26	3	1	110	21	+89	81	Promotion to Liga Bet
2	Hapoel Neve Golan	30	25	2	3	107	45	+62	77 (Note: A match between Hapoel Ramat Israel and Hapoel Neve Golan was abandoned in the 8th minute due to a brawl. The IFA set the match result to 0–0 with no point awarded and deducted one point from each team.)	Promotion Playoffs
3	Bnei Yehud	30	22	3	5	99	40	+59	69	Promotion Playoffs
4	Otzma Holon	30	21	2	7	120	46	+74	65	
5	Shikun Vatikim Ramat Gan	30	20	5	5	95	33	+62	65	
6	Hapoel Ramat Israel	30	16	6	8	99	66	+33	54	
7	Maccabi HaShikma Hen	30	16	3	11	82	61	+21	51	
8	Inter Aliyah Tel Aviv	30	11	1	18	61	66	−5	34	
9	Hapoel Tzafririm Holon	30	9	5	16	72	97	−25	32	
10	Maccabi Spartak Ramat Gan	30	9	4	17	62	86	−24	31 (Note: Maccabi Spartak Ramat Gan wins head-to-head against Beitar Jaffa on away goals (2–2; 1–1).)	
11	Beitar Jaffa	30	9	4	17	43	74	−31	31	
12	Maccabi Or Yehuda	30	9	2	19	54	98	−44	29	
13	Elitzur Jaffa Tel Aviv	30	7	2	21	56	115	−59	23	
14	Elitzur Yehud	30	6	5	19	51	100	−49	23	
15	Beitar Ezra	30	7	1	22	36	91	−55	22	
16	Maccabi Pardes Katz	30	2	2	26	44	152	−108	8	

Updated to match(es) played on 11 April 2018. Source: Liga Gimel Tel Aviv IFA (in Hebrew)
Rules for classification: 1) points; 2) number of wins; 3) head-to-head; 4) deciding match.

=== Results ===
Home \ Away	BEZ	BJA	BRG	BYE	EJA	EYE	HNG	HRI	ZFH	IAL	MSH	MOY	MPK	MSR	SVR	OZH
Beitar Ezra	—	0–3	0–4	0–2	1–3	2–2	0–7	3–2	0–4	2–3	1–3	5–1	2–1	0–4	0–1	0–3
Beitar Jaffa	4–1	—	2–4	0–4	4–0	0–3	1–2	1–8	2–2	2–1	2–0	1–1	1–2	2–2	2–4	1–2
Beitar Ramat Gan	6–1	2–0	—	3–1	3–0	7–3	2–0	0–0	4–0	1–0	3–2	7–0	3–1	4–1	1–0	3–1
Bnei Yehud	10–0	2–1	1–2	—	1–4	1–0	1–2	2–1	4–0	3–1	2–2	3–2	8–5	4–0	0–0	2–0
Elitzur Jaffa Tel Aviv	1–4	2–3	1–7	3–11	—	4–1	1–4	1–4	1–4	1–4	4–5	3–1	1–1	5–0	1–3	0–4
Elitzur Yehud	1–2	2–1	1–4	1–3	3–3	—	2–6	1–1	3–3	2–5	0–2	4–8	4–2	2–2	1–5	2–4
Hapoel Neve Golan	4–1	6–2	2–1	2–3	4–1	2–1	—	6–3	10–6	5–4	5–1	2–1	3–0	5–0	2–2	4–0
Hapoel Ramat Israel	2–0	5–1	0–0	0–4	10–6	7–0	0–0 (Note: The match between Hapoel Ramat Israel and Hapoel Neve Golan was abandoned in the 8th minute due to a brawl. The IFA set the match result to 0–0 with no point awarded and deducted one point from each team.)	—	3–3	6–2	2–5	4–0	4–4	6–2	2–1	1–3
Hapoel Tzafririm Holon	2–3	0–1	0–6	1–3	2–1	2–3	0–8	4–7	—	1–3	2–2	5–2	5–3	2–1	1–2	0–5
Inter Aliyah Tel Aviv	1–0	4–0	0–6	1–3	0–1	1–2	1–3	3–4	4–4	—	4–3	3–0	8–1	1–0	0–2	1–2
Maccabi HaShikma Hen	1–0	1–2	0–3	1–3	6–1	4–1	0–1	3–2	4–3	3–0 (Note: The match originally ended with Inter Aliyah winning 3–2. However, Inter Aliyah fielded an ineliglible player, the match was given to Maccabi HaShikma Hen.)	—	4–2	6–2	2–2	3–1	5–3
Maccabi Or Yehuda	4–1	1–0	0–6	3–4	3–4	1–0	0–2	3–4	4–2	2–1	1–0	—	4–1	1–9	0–6	2–2
Maccabi Pardes Katz	1–4	1–2	2–11	0–5	2–1	3–5	1–4	1–5	3–5	0–4	0–9	0–1	—	2–8	1–4	2–16
Maccabi Spartak Ramat Gan	3–2	1–1	1–4	0–5	3–1	7–1	1–3	0–3	1–5	2–1	1–3	1–0	7–1	—	1–3	1–7
Shikun Vatikim Ramat Gan	5–0	3–0	1–1	2–2	12–1	2–0	1–3	5–0	4–3	3–0	2–0	9–2	4–0	4–0	—	1–3
Otzma Holon	3–1	8–1	0–2	3–2	5–0	6–0	8–0	2–3	0–1	2–0	6–2	5–4	8–1	6–1	3–3	—

Updated to match(es) played on 11 April 2018. Source: Liga Gimel Tel Aviv IFA (in Hebrew)
Legend: Blue = home team win; Red = away team win.

=== Positions by round ===
Team \ Round	1	2	3	4	5	6	7	8	9	10	11	12	13	14	15	16	17	18	19	20	21	22	23	24	25	26	27	28	29	30
Beitar Ramat Gan	6	3	2	3	2	2	1	1	1	1	1	1	1	1	1	1	1	1	1	1	1	1	1	1	1	1	1	1	1	1
Hapoel Neve Golan	16	11	6	4	4	3	3	3	2	2	2	2	2	2	2	2	2	2	2	2	2	2	2	2	2	2	2	2	2	2
Bnei Yehud	12	4	4	2	5	5	5	5	6	6	5	4	4	4	5	6	6	6	5	3	3	3	3	3	3	3	3	3	3	3
Otzma Holon	1	1	1	1	1	1	2	2	3	3	3	3	3	3	3	3	3	3	3	4	4	4	4	4	4	4	4	4	4	4
Shikun Vatikim Ramat Gan	4	6	9	6	8	4	4	4	5	4	4	5	5	5	4	4	4	4	4	5	5	5	5	5	5	5	5	5	5	5
Hapoel Ramat Israel	9	13	14	10	10	9	10	8	7	5	7	7	7	6	6	5	5	5	6	6	6	6	6	6	6	6	6	6	6	6
Maccabi HaShikma Hen	5	9	5	8	7	7	6	6	4	7	6	6	6	7	7	7	7	7	7	7	7	7	8	7	7	7	7	7	7	7
Inter Aliyah	2	5	8	7	6	8	8	7	9	11	11	9	9	9	11	8	8	8	8	8	8	8	7	8	8	8	8	9	9	8
Hapoel Tzafririm Holon	10	14	15	11	12	11	11	10	8	9	8	8	8	8	9	10	12	13	10	11	9	9	10	9	9	9	9	8	8	9
Maccabi Spartak Ramat Gan	14	15	11	14	14	14	15	13	15	14	14	14	15	15	13	12	14	9	12	10	11	10	9	10	10	10	10	10	10	10
Beitar Jaffa	8	10	12	9	9	12	12	11	11	12	12	13	11	11	8	9	11	12	9	12	12	12	13	13	14	15	12	11	12	11
Maccabi Or Yehuda	11	7	9	13	13	13	14	15	14	15	15	15	14	13	14	13	9	10	11	9	10	11	11	11	12	12	11	12	11	12
Elitzur Jaffa Tel Aviv	3	2	3	5	3	6	7	9	10	8	10	11	12	12	10	11	13	14	14	14	14	15	15	15	11	11	13	13	13	13
Elitzur Yehud	13	8	7	12	11	10	9	12	13	10	9	10	10	10	12	14	10	11	13	13	13	14	14	14	15	13	14	14	14	14
Beitar Ezra	7	12	13	15	15	15	13	14	12	13	13	12	13	14	15	15	15	15	15	15	15	13	12	12	13	14	15	15	15	15
Maccabi Pardes Katz	15	16	16	16	16	16	16	16	16	16	16	16	16	16	16	16	16	16	16	16	16	16	16	16	16	16	16	16	16	16

Source: IFA

== Central (South C) Division ==
Liga Gimel Central
- Season: 2017–18
- Champions: Hapoel Lod
- Matches played: 182
- Goals scored: 984 (5.41 per match)
- Top goalscorer: Elad Dan (F.C. Rishon LeZion) (35)

Pos	Team	Pld	W	D	L	GF	GA	GD	Pts	Qualification or relegation
1	Hapoel Lod	26	21	2	3	97	31	+66	65	Promotion to Liga Bet
2	Hapoel Ironi Gedera	26	20	5	1	87	25	+62	65	Promotion Playoffs
3	Hapoel Bnei Ashdod	26	20	2	4	117	35	+82	62 (Note: Hapoel Bnei Ashdod wins head-to-head against Beitar Yavne (2–1; 0–0))	Promotion Playoffs
4	Beitar Yavne	26	20	2	4	87	27	+60	62	
5	Maccabi Kiryat Ekron	26	16	4	6	74	44	+30	52	
6	Hapoel Abirei Bat Yam	26	15	3	8	91	72	+19	48	
7	Beitar Ashdod	26	13	1	12	92	46	+46	40	
8	Hapoel Ramla	26	10	2	14	85	96	−11	32	
9	Tzeirei Lod	26	9	3	14	35	65	−30	30	
10	F.C. RIshon LeZion	26	9	0	17	66	103	−37	27	
11	Hapoel Tirat Shalom	26	4	3	19	38	93	−55	15 (Note: Hapoel Tirat Shalom wins head-to-head against Maccabi Bnei Abu Ghosh (1–1; 4–3))	
12	Maccabi Bnei Abu Ghosh	26	4	3	19	39	108	−69	15	
13	Hapoel Mevaseret Zion	26	3	0	23	37	101	−64	9	
14	Hapoel Matzliah	26	2	2	22	37	136	−99	8	

Updated to match(es) played on 7 April 2018. Source: Liga Gimel Central IFA (in Hebrew)
Rules for classification: 1) points; 2) number of wins; 3) head-to-head; 4) deciding match.

=== Results ===
Home \ Away	BAS	BYA	RLZ	HBY	HBA	HIG	HLD	MZL	HMZ	HRA	HTS	BAG	MKE	ZLD
Beitar Ashdod	—	4–1	8–0	1–3	0–4	1–1	0–2	6–0	7–0	9–3	4–0	2–3	1–2	0–1
Beitar Yavne	2–0	—	8–1	3–1	1–2	4–4	2–0	7–1	3–0	5–4	2–1	5–1	2–1	2–0
F.C. RIshon LeZion	0–9	1–7	—	4–3	3–6	0–1	1–6	7–4	2–1	4–3	2–0	7–2	1–3	5–0
Hapoel Abirei Bat Yam	6–5	1–0	6–3	—	3–3	0–2	2–6	9–0	4–0	4–5	8–2	9–3	0–0	1–0
Hapoel Bnei Ashdod	3–1	0–0	2–1	2–3	—	4–3	1–4	7–1 (Note: The match was abandoned at half-time, with Hapoel Bnei Ashdod leading 7–1 as Hapoel Matzliah refused to continue. The IFA set the final score to 7–1.)	7–1	3–0	8–2	7–1	6–0	11–2 (Note: The match was abandoned at the 77th minute, with Hapoel Bnei Ashdod leading 4–1, as the designated paramedic left the stadium and no replacement was found. The IFA ordered the match to be replayed.)
Hapoel Ironi Gedera	3–2	2–0	5–2	3–2	2–1	—	2–2	10–1	6–0	4–1	2–1	3–0	1–1	2–1
Hapoel Lod	3–1	0–4	3–2	3–0	3–1	1–1	—	10–3	7–1	5–0	5–0	4–0	2–1	4–2
Hapoel Matzliah	0–5	2–6	4–3	3–3	0–4	0–9	1–2	—	4–2	0–5	1–2	2–2	1–5	0–1
Hapoel Mevaseret Zion	0–4	1–6	2–3	1–2	2–3	1–6	1–3	3–1	—	0–4	8–2	1–2	1–3	1–2
Hapoel Ramla	5–8	0–2	7–3	3–4	0–8	0–2	2–9	6–1	7–2	—	3–3	5–3	4–4	4–1
Hapoel Tirat Shalom	2–4	0–4	3–1	6–8	1–8	0–3	0–3	3–1	2–3	2–4	—	4–3	0–3	1–1
Maccabi Bnei Abu Ghosh	0–2	0–3	2–5	0–1	0–11	0–5	0–6	8–5	3–2	1–6	1–1	—	0–5	0–2
Maccabi Kiryat Ekron	2–1	0–6	5–4	11–1	1–2	0–1	3–2	7–0	3–1	6–3	1–0	4–3	—	0–0
Tzeirei Lod	0–7	0–2	3–1	3–7	0–3	0–4	0–2	4–1	5–2	3–1	2–0	1–1	1–3	—

Updated to match(es) played on 7 April 2018. Source: Liga Gimel Central IFA (in Hebrew)
Legend: Blue = home team win; Red = away team win.

=== Positions by round ===
Team \ Round	1	2	3	4	5	6	7	8	9	10	11	12	13	14	15	16	17	18	19	20	21	22	23	24	25	26
Hapoel Lod	3	2	1	1	4	3	2	2	1	1	1	1	1	1	1	1	1	1	1	1	1	1	1	1	1	1
Hapoel Ironi Gedera	6	4	3	3	2	1	1	1	2	2	2	2	2	2	3	2	2	2	2	2	2	2	2	2	4	2
Hapoel Bnei Ashdod	12	12	7	8	6	6	5	4	4	3	3	3	3	4	4	3	4	4	3	4	4	3	3	3	2	3
Beitar Yavne	2	3	2	2	1	4	4	3	6	4	5	5	4	3	2	4	3	3	4	3	3	4	4	4	3	4
Maccabi Kiryat Ekron	4	5	6	4	3	2	3	5	3	5	6	6	6	6	6	6	6	5	5	5	5	5	5	5	5	5
Hapoel Abirei Bat Yam	11	8	5	5	5	5	6	6	5	6	4	4	5	5	5	5	5	6	6	6	6	6	6	6	6	6
Beitar Ashdod	1	1	4	6	8	7	7	7	7	7	7	7	7	7	7	7	7	7	7	7	7	7	7	7	7	7
Hapoel Ramla	7	10	12	9	9	10	9	8	9	9	8	8	9	8	9	9	8	8	8	8	8	8	8	8	8	8
Tzeirei Lod	14	11	13	13	10	11	11	12	11	10	10	10	10	10	8	8	9	9	9	9	9	9	9	9	9	9
F.C. Rishon LeZion	9	14	10	10	11	9	8	10	8	8	9	9	8	9	10	10	10	10	10	10	10	10	10	10	10	10
Hapoel Tirat Shalom	7	9	11	12	13	13	13	11	12	12	13	13	13	14	14	12	12	12	12	12	12	12	11	11	11	11
Maccabi Bnei Abu Ghosh	13	7	9	7	7	8	10	9	10	11	11	11	11	11	11	11	11	11	11	11	11	11	12	12	12	12
Hapoel Mevaseret Zion	4	5	8	10	12	12	12	13	13	13	12	12	12	12	13	14	14	14	14	14	14	14	14	13	13	13
Hapoel Matzliah	9	13	14	14	14	14	14	14	14	14	14	14	14	13	12	13	13	13	13	13	13	13	13	14	14	14

Source: IFA

== South (South D) Division ==
Liga Gimel South
- Season: 2017–18
- Champions: Beitar Kiryat Gat
- Matches played: 108
- Goals scored: 509 (4.71 per match)
- Top goalscorer: Hisham Azbarga (Ironi Kuseife) (22)

Pos	Team	Pld	W	D	L	GF	GA	GD	Pts	Qualification or relegation
1	Beitar Kiryat Gat	20	18	0	2	63	16	+47	54	Promotion to Liga Bet
2	Ironi Kuseife	20	15	2	3	76	23	+53	47	Promotion Playoffs
3	F.C. Arad	20	14	1	5	55	36	+19	43	Promotion Playoffs
4	F.C. Be'er Sheva Haim Levy	20	10	2	8	46	42	+4	32	
5	A.S. Ashkelon	20	10	0	10	38	43	−5	30	
6	Hapoel Merhavim	20	9	3	8	55	41	+14	30	
7	F.C. Matnas Ofakim	20	8	4	8	33	37	−4	28	
8	Maccabi Ironi Hura	20	5	2	13	44	66	−22	17	
9	Hapoel Rahat	20	5	1	14	37	67	−30	16	
10	Maccabi Dimona	20	4	1	15	34	74	−40	13	
11	Tzeirei al-Hoshla	20	3	2	15	31	67	−36	11	
12	Hapoel Bnei Lakiya (Note: Hapoel Bnei Lakiya registered to play in Liga Gimel, but withdrew before playing a match.)	0	0	0	0	0	0	0	0	Folded

Updated to match(es) played on 4 April 2018. Source: Liga Gimel South IFA (in Hebrew)
Rules for classification: 1) points; 2) number of wins; 3) head-to-head; 4) deciding match.

=== Results ===
Home \ Away	BKG	ARD	BSV	OFK	HMR	HRT	IKU	ASA	MDI	MIH	ZAH
Beitar Kiryat Gat	—	2–0	1–0	4–0	5–0	8–0	0–6	1–0	5–0	5–0	3–0
F.C. Arad	1–2	—	3–0	2–0	3–3	5–3	1–6	2–1	4–1	3–2	2–0
F.C. Be'er Sheva	2–1	1–2	—	3–2	4–3	7–1	1–5	1–2	0–3	5–2	4–1
Matnas Ofakim	1–3	0–4	1–1	—	1–0	2–0	0–4	3–1	4–0	7–3	1–1
Hapoel Merhavim	1–2	3–4	5–0	1–1	—	3–1	0–2	5–2	4–2	6–0	3–2
Hapoel Rahat	1–2	2–4	0–3	1–2	1–5	—	2–2	1–2	4–2	2–6	6–4
Ironi Kuseife	0–1	2–4	4–0	4–0	1–1	3–0	—	4–0	5–0	6–1	5–2
A.S. Ashkelon	1–2	3–2	2–3	2–1	4–3	0–3	0–4	—	4–0	3–1	3–1
Maccabi Dimona	2–8	1–4	1–4	3–3	2–3	5–1	3–2	0–4	—	2–1	3–5
Maccabi Ironi Hura	0–1	1–3	2–2	0–1	4–3	2–5	5–7	4–0	5–3	—	2–2
Tzeirei al-Hoshla	1–7	3–2	1–5	0–3 (Note: The match result was 1–1. As Tzeirei al-Hoshla fielded an ineligible player, the match result was set to 3–0 to Ofakim. Tzeirei al-Hoshla had two points deducted, but the punishment was cancelled upon appeal.)	0–3	0–3	2–4	2–4	4–1	0–3 (Note: The match result was 2–1 to Maccabi Ironi Hura. As Tzeirei al-Hoshla fielded an ineligible player, the match result was set to 3–0 to Hura.)	—

Updated to match(es) played on 4 April 2018. Source: Liga Gimel South IFA (in Hebrew)
Legend: Blue = home team win; Red = away team win.

=== Positions by round ===
Team \ Round	1	2	3	4	5	6	7	8	9	10	11	12	13	14	15	16	17	18	19	20	21	22
Beitar Kiryat Gat	1	1	1	1	4	3	4	4	3	3	2	2	2	1	1	1	1	1	1	1	1	1
Ironi Kuseife	6	8	3	3	1	1	1	1	1	1	1	1	1	2	2	2	2	2	2	2	2	2
F.C. Arad	8	6	2	2	3	2	2	2	2	2	3	3	3	3	3	3	3	3	3	3	3	3
F.C. Be'er Sheva	3	5	6	6	8	8	3	3	4	5	5	5	7	7	7	6	4	5	5	4	4	4
A.S. Ashkelon	9	9	7	5	7	9	7	8	8	8	8	6	5	6	5	5	6	4	4	5	5	5
Hapoel Merhavim	6	7	10	7	9	6	5	5	5	4	4	4	6	4	6	7	7	7	6	6	6	6
Matnas Ofakim	4	3	5	4	2	4	6	6	6	6	6	7	4	5	4	4	5	6	7	7	7	7
Maccabi Ironi Hura	11	10	9	10	10	10	10	10	10	10	10	10	10	10	10	10	10	10	10	10	9	8
Hapoel Rahat	2	4	8	9	6	5	9	9	9	9	9	9	9	9	9	9	9	9	9	8	8	9
Maccabi Dimona	4	2	4	8	5	7	8	7	7	7	7	8	8	8	8	8	8	8	8	9	10	10
Tzeirei al-Hoshla	10	11	11	11	11	11	11	11	11	11	11	11	11	11	11	11	11	11	11	11	11	11

Source: Liga Gimel South IFA (in Hebrew)

== Promotion play-offs ==
=== North A division ===
Divisional finals
UG2	Maccabi Ahva Sha'ab	1
UG3	Bnei Tuba-Zangariyye	0
LG2	Maccabi Kafr Manda	0
LG3	Maccabi Ironi Yafa	3^{1}

Regional finals
UG2	Maccabi Ahva Sha'ab	2
LG3	Maccabi Ironi Yafa	3

Test Match
LB	Sketzia Ma'alot	2 (4)
LG3	Maccabi Ironi Yafa	2 (1)

^{1}The match result was 1–0 to Maccabi Ironi Yafa (after extra time). However, as Kafr Manda fielded an ineligible player, the match was given as a walkover to Yafa.

Maccabi Ironi Yafa remained in Liga Gimel; Sektzia Ma'alot remained in Liga Bet

=== North B division ===
Divisional finals
Jez2	Ihud Bnei Baqa	3
Jez3	Ahi Bir al-Maksur	1
Sam2	Beitar Haifa	0
Sam3	Maccabi Neve Sha'anan	3

Regional finals
Jez2	Ihud Bnei Baqa	5
Sam3	Maccabi Neve Sha'anan	2

Test Match
LB	Maccabi Ein Mahil	2
Jez2	Ihud Bnei Baqa	1

Ihud Bnei Baqa remained in Liga Gimel; Maccabi Ein Mahil remained in Liga Bet

=== South A division ===
Divisional finals
Sha2	Bnei Ra'anana	–^{1}
Sha3	Sporting Tel Aviv	–
TA2	Hapoel Neve Golan	0
TA3	Bnei Yehud	2

Regional finals
–	–	–
TA3	Bnei Yehud	–

Test Match
LB	Hapoel Kiryat Ono	2
TA3	Bnei Yehud	0

^{1}The match was abandoned at the 36th minute following a brawl between the teams. The match was annulled and neither team advanced to the next round.

Bnei Yehud remained in Liga Gimel; Hapoel Kiryat Ono remained in Liga Bet

=== South B division ===
Divisional finals
Cen2	Hapoel Ironi Gedera	2 (8)
Cen3	Hapoel Bnei Ashdod	2 (7)
So2	Ironi Kuseife	4
So3	F.C. Arad	2

Regional finals
Cen2	Hapoel Ironi Gedera	2
So2	Ironi Kuseife	3

Test Match
LB	Tzeirei Rahat	0
So2	Ironi Kuseife	2

Ironi Kuseife Promoted to Liga Bet; Tzeirei Rahat relegated to Liga Gimel

== Further promotions ==
The following teams are eligible to promotion if a vacancy would be created in 2018–19 Liga Bet:

North A

Team	Division	Points-per-Match Ave.
Maccabi Ironi Yafa	Lower Galilee	Play-off losing team
Maccabi Ahva Sha'ab	Upper Galilee	2.45
Hapoel Bnei Tuba-Zangariyye	Upper Galilee	2.25
Maccabi Kafr Manda	Lower Galilee	2.20

South A

Team	Division	Points-per-Match Ave.
Bnei Yehud	Tel Aviv	Play-off losing team
Hapoel Neve Golan	Tel Aviv	2.50
Bnei Ra'anana	Sharon	2.17
Otzma Holon	Tel Aviv	2.17

As both Bnei Ra'anana and Otzma Holon are equal on points-per-match average, Bnei Ra'anana are ahead on winning percentage (0.71% and 0.70%)

North B

Team	Division	Points-per-Match Ave.
Ihud Bnei Baqa	Jezreel	Play-off losing team
Beitar Haifa	Samaria	2.46
Ahi Bir al-Maksur	Jezreel	2.32
Maccabi Neve Sha'anan	Samaria	2.25

South B

Team	Division	Points-per-Match Ave.
Tzeirei Rahat	South B	Play-off losing team
Hapoel Ironi Gedera	Central	2.50
Hapoel Bnei Ashdod	Central	2.38
Beitar Yavne	Central	2.38

As both Hapoel Bnei Ashdod and Beitar Yavne are equal on points-per-match average and winning percentage, Hapoel Bnei Ashdod are ahead on goal difference (+82 and +60).
