= 2017–18 Liga Bet =

Liga Bet
- Season: 2017–18
- Champions: Hapoel Kaukab; Hapoel Bnei Zalafa; Shimshon Kafr Qasim; A.S. Ashdod
- Matches: 906
- Goals: 2,769 (3.06 per match)

The 2017–18 Liga Bet season was the 62nd season of fourth tier football in Israel.

== Changes from last season ==
=== Team changes ===
==== Promotion and relegation ====
League	Promoted to League	Relegated from League
To/from Liga Alef	Hapoel Shefa-'Amr; Hapoel Umm al-Fahm; Hapoel Tzafririm Holon Yaniv; Nordia Jerusalem	Tzeirei Kafr Kanna; Hapoel F.C. Karmiel Safed (folded); Bnei Jaffa Ortodoxim; F.C. Shikun HaMizrah
To/from Liga Gimel	Bnei HaGolan VeHaGalil; Maccabi Nujeidat; Maccabi Bnei Reineh; Hapoel Bnei Fureidis; Shimshon Kafr Qasim; Ironi Beit Dagan; A.S. Ashdod; Hapoel Yeruham	Beitar Haifa; Maccabi Sektzia Ma'alot-Tarshiha; Maccabi Ironi Yafa; Beitar Kafr Kanna; Beitar Ramat Gan; Maccabi Ironi Kfar Yona; Beitar Yavne; Maccabi Segev Shalom (folded)

- To replace the folded Hapoel F.C. Karmiel Safed, Tzeirei Tamra was promoted from Liga Gimel, as the best second-placed team in the northern divisions.
- In December 2016, the IFA was ordered to demote Maccabi Umm al-Fahm to Liga Gimel by FIFA due to an unpaid debt. The club, which finished 11th in North B division was demoted at the end of the season and was replaced initially by Maccabi Ironi Tamra, the second best second-placed team in the northern divisions of Liga Gimel. However, an appeal was lodged by Beitar Pardes Hanna, which was the best second-placed team in the Liga Gimel division which promote to North B division, claiming that only teams from the Jezre'el and Samaria division should be considered for promotion as replacement to Maccabi Umm al-Fahm. The IFA Supreme Court accepted the appeal and Promoted Beitar Pardes Hanna to Liga Bet.
- During the summer the merger between Maccabi Ironi Acre and Hapoel Kiryat Yam broke up, leading Hapoel Kiryat Yam to register the club in Liga Gimel. Maccabi Ironi Acre then merged with Maccabi Sektzia Ma'alot-Tarshiha, effectively reprieving Sektzia Ma'alot from relegation.

=== Format changes ===
- The IFA introduced promotion/relegations playoffs between Liga Bet and Liga Gimel. As a result, The two bottom club of each Liga Bet division will relegate directly to Liga Gimel, while the 13th placed and 14th placed teams in each division will face each other in one match. The losing team will face the Liga Gimel play-off winner in a single match for a spot in Liga Bet.

== North A Division ==
Liga Bet North A
- Season: 2017–18
- Champions: Hapoel Kaukab
- Matches: 214
- Goals: 552 (2.58 per match)
- Top goalscorer: Mohammad Abu-Ria (Hapoel Kaukab) (17)

Pos	Team	Pld	W	D	L	GF	GA	GD	Pts	Qualification or relegation
1	Hapoel Kaukab	28	20	6	2	62	19	+43	66	Promotion to Liga Alef
2	Ahva Kafr Manda	28	19	7	2	50	21	+29	64	Promotion Playoffs
3	Hapoel Bu'eine	28	13	7	8	39	25	+14	46 (Note: Hapoel Bu'eine wins head-to-head against Ironi Bnei Kabul (1–0, 1–1).)	Promotion Playoffs
4	Ironi Bnei Kabul	28	13	7	8	31	23	+8	46	Promotion Playoffs
5	Tzeirei Kafr Kanna	28	11	8	9	37	37	0	41	Promotion Playoffs
6	Beitar Nahariya	28	11	4	13	35	40	−5	37	
7	Bnei HaGolan VeHaGalil	28	9	8	11	41	46	−5	35	
8	Ihud Bnei Majd al-Krum	28	9	7	12	38	38	0	34	
9	Tzeirei Tamra	28	9	6	13	31	32	−1	33	
10	Maccabi Tzeirei Shefa-'Amr	28	8	8	12	38	35	+3	32	
11	Maccabi Bnei Nahf	28	7	11	10	33	41	−8	32	
12	Ahi Acre	28	8	6	14	30	47	−17	30	
13	Ahva Arraba	28	8	5	15	27	50	−23	29	Relegation Playoffs
14	Maccabi Sektzia Ma'alot-Tarshiha	28	6	9	13	24	44	−20	27	Relegation Playoffs
15	Hapoel Ihud Bnei Sumei	28	6	7	15	25	43	−18	25	Relegation to Liga Gimel
16	F.C. Julis (Note: F.C. Julis withdrew for the league after 6 matches due to financial difficulties.)	0	0	0	0	0	0	0	0	Folded

Updated to match(es) played on 08 April 2018. Source: Liga B North A IFA (in Hebrew)
Rules for classification: 1) points; 2) number of wins; 3) head-to-head; 4) deciding match.

=== Results ===
Home \ Away	AAC	AAR	AKM	BNH	BGG	FCJ	HBU	IBS	KKB	BMK	IBK	MBN	MSA	SMT	ZKK	ZTM
Ahi Acre	—	0–2	0–3	0–1	1–1		1–1	1–2	0–4	3–1	0–2	5–3	1–0	3–1	0–0	0–2
Ahva Arraba	2–2	—	0–4	0–3	0–2		0–3	1–6	0–2	0–3	1–2	0–3	0–1	2–3	1–1	2–1
Ahva Kafr Manda	2–0	1–0	—	3–1	3–0		1–0	3–1	0–0	2–1	0–0	2–1	1–1	2–0	2–1	0–0
Beitar Nahariya	1–0	1–2	0–2	—	6–2		1–0	2–0	0–4	0–2	1–1	1–1	0–4	0–1	3–0	3–2
Bnei HaGolan VeHaGalil	2–1	2–2	2–3	2–2	—	2–0	0–1	2–0	0–1	2–0	1–3	2–3	1–1	1–1	2–2	0–1
F.C. Julis		1–1				—		2–1								
Hapoel Bu'eine	3–1	1–1	2–0	0–3 (Note: The match originally ended with Hapoel Bu'eine winning 3–1. As Bu'eine fielded an ineligible player, the match was given to Beitar Nahariya. An appeal submitted by Hapoel Bu'eine was denied.)	0–1		—	2–0	1–2	0–1	1–0	4–2	3–1	1–0	2–1	1–1
Hapoel Ihud Bnei Sumei	1–2	1–1	1–1	0–1	0–3 (Note: The match originally ended with Ihud Bnei Sumei winning 3–1. As Bnei Sumei fielded an ineligible player, the match was given to Bnei HaGolan VeHaGalil.)		0–4	—	0–1	0–3	0–1	0–0	0–5	1–1	0–0	2–1
Hapoel Kaukab	2–0	1–2	2–2	4–3	3–0		2–2	1–0	—	1–1	1–1	0–1	2–1	5–1	4–0	2–0
Ihud Bnei Majd al-Krum	1–1	1–2	0–1	3–0	4–1	2–1	1–1	1–4	0–5	—	3–0	3–1	4–2	1–2	1–3	0–1
Ironi Bnei Kabul	3–0	1–0	0–1	1–0	0–1	2–0	1–1	2–0	0–3	1–0	—	1–1	1–0	1–0	1–3	1–0
Maccabi Bnei Nahf	1–1	1–3	2–2	2–1	0–3		2–1	0–0	0–2	0–0	2–1	—	0–1	0–0	0–1	1–3
Maccabi Tzeirei Shefa-'Amr	4–1	1–2	2–3	0–0	0–3		0–0	0–2	2–3	2–2	0–0	0–0	—	0–0	4–1	2–1
Sektzia Ma'alot	1–2	2–0	1–3	0–1	2–2		0–2	1–1	1–1	0–0	1–5	1–3	1–0	—	0–1	1–1
Tzeirei Kafr Kanna	1–2	1–0	2–1	3–0	5–2		2–0	1–0	1–3	1–1	0–0	2–2	3–2	0–2	—	0–0
Tzeirei Tamra	0–2	0–1	1–2	1–0	1–1		0–2	2–3	0–1	2–0	2–1	1–1	0–2	5–0	2–1	—

Updated to match(es) played on 08 April 2018. Source: Liga B North A IFA (in Hebrew)
Legend: Blue = home team win; Red = away team win.

=== Positions by round ===
Team ╲ Round	1	2	3	4	5	6	7	8	9	10	11	12	13	14	15	16	17	18	19	20	21	22	23	24	25	26	27	28	29	30
Hapoel Kaukab	3	2	1	1	1	1	1	1	1	1	1	1	1	1	1	1	1	1	1	1	1	1	1	1	1	1	1	2	2	1
Ahva Kafr Manda	6	10	10	7	5	2	2	2	2	2	2	2	2	2	2	2	2	2	2	2	2	2	2	2	2	2	2	1	1	2
Hapoel Bu'eine	4	3	5	8	11	10	11	9	7	7	7	5	4	5	4	5	4	4	3	3	3	3	3	3	3	3	3	3	3	3
Ironi Bnei Kabul	1	1	2	2	2	3	3	3	5	4	4	4	5	4	3	3	3	3	4	5	5	4	4	4	4	5	5	4	4	4
Tzeirei Kafr Kanna	10	8	3	4	4	6	7	5	3	3	3	3	3	3	5	4	5	5	5	4	4	5	5	5	5	4	4	5	5	5
Beitar Nahariya	8	3	5	9	6	4	4	6	6	5	5	6	6	7	9	9	8	8	8	9	11	9	11	8	8	9	7	7	7	6
Bnei HaGolan VeHaGalil	14	15	11	3	3	5	5	4	4	6	6	7	7	9	7	6	6	6	6	6	6	6	6	6	6	6	6	6	6	7
Bnei Majd al-Krum	4	7	3	5	8	11	10	8	10	10	9	10	8	10	10	10	12	12	9	11	9	10	8	7	10	7	10	11	10	8
Tzeirei Tamra	15	5	7	10	7	8	6	7	8	8	8	9	11	8	6	7	7	7	7	7	7	7	7	9	9	11	8	8	8	9
Maccabi Tzeirei Shefa-'Amr	12	12	14	14	10	9	9	13	13	13	12	11	9	6	8	8	9	10	11	12	12	12	12	12	11	10	11	12	11	10
Maccabi Bnei Nahf	8	13	9	6	9	7	8	10	9	11	11	12	12	13	13	11	10	9	10	8	10	11	9	10	7	8	9	9	9	11
Ahi Acre	16	16	16	11	12	12	12	14	14	14	14	14	14	15	15	15	15	15	15	15	15	15	15	15	15	15	15	14	13	12
Ahva Arraba	12	14	15	16	15	15	14	12	12	9	10	8	10	11	11	12	11	11	12	13	14	13	13	13	13	12	12	10	12	13
Sektzia Ma'alot	6	11	13	13	14	14	15	15	15	15	15	15	15	14	14	14	13	14	14	14	13	14	14	14	14	14	14	15	14	14
Hapoel Ihud Bnei Sumei	2	6	8	15	16	13	13	11	11	12	13	13	13	12	12	13	14	13	13	10	8	8	10	11	12	13	13	13	15	15
F.C. Julis	10	8	12	11	12	F	F	F	F	F	F	F	F	F	F	F	F	F	F	F	F	F	F	F	F	F	F	F	F	F

Source: IFA
F = Folded

== North B Division ==
Liga Bet North B
- Season: 2017–18
- Champions: Hapoel Bnei Zalafa
- Matches: 215
- Goals: 702 (3.27 per match)
- Top goalscorer: Avi Malka (F.C. Daburiyya) (25)

Pos	Team	Pld	W	D	L	GF	GA	GD	Pts	Qualification or relegation
1	Hapoel Bnei Zalafa	28	19	4	5	57	20	+37	61	Promotion to Liga Alef
2	F.C. Daburiyya	28	18	7	3	55	18	+37	61	Promotion Playoffs
3	Ihud Bnei Kafr Qara	28	15	7	6	44	26	+18	52	Promotion Playoffs
4	Hapoel Bnei Fureidis	28	14	5	9	51	32	+19	47	Promotion Playoffs
5	Maccabi Ahi Iksal	28	14	4	10	62	36	+26	46	Promotion Playoffs
6	Hapoel Bnei Ar'ara 'Ara	28	12	6	10	45	27	+18	42	
7	Maccabi Nujeidat	28	12	3	13	46	48	−2	39	
8	Al-Nahda Nazareth	28	12	2	14	51	46	+5	38	
9	Maccabi Bnei Reineh	28	11	5	12	42	38	+4	38	
10	Hapoel Ramot Menashe Megiddo	28	10	4	14	43	59	−16	34 (Note: Hapoel Ramot Menashe Megiddo wins head-to-head against Hapoel Sandala Gilboa (0–0, 2–1).)	
11	Hapoel Sandala Gilboa	28	10	4	14	38	48	−10	34	
12	Hapoel Daliyat al-Karmel	28	10	3	15	37	56	−19	33	
13	Hapoel Tirat HaCarmel	28	8	8	12	51	42	+9	32	Relegation Playoffs
14	Maccabi Ein Mahil	28	8	5	15	34	68	−34	29	Relegation Playoffs
15	Beitar Pardes Hanna	28	2	3	23	19	111	−92	9	Relegation to Liga Gimel
16	F.C. Tzeirei Tur'an (Note: Tzeirei Tur'an withdrew from the league following a dispute between the club management and the local council.)	0	0	0	0	0	0	0	0	Folded

Updated to match(es) played on 04 April 2018. Source: Liga B North B IFA (in Hebrew)
Rules for classification: 1) points; 2) number of wins; 3) head-to-head; 4) deciding match.

=== Results ===
Home \ Away	NHD	BPH	FCD	BAA	HBF	BZL	HDK	HRM	HSG	HTC	BKQ	AIX	MBR	MEM	MNU	ZTU
Al-Nahda Nazareth	—	7–1	2–4	1–1	1–2	1–5	4–0	4–0	2–1	1–3	0–1	1–4	2–0	0–1	0–1	4–0
Beitar Pardes Hanna	0–3	—	1–1	0–8	0–3	1–8	2–3	1–5	0–2	0–3	0–2	0–9	0–2	2–1	1–8	3–1
F.C. Daburiyya	1–1	5–0	—	2–0	3–0	2–0	3–1	2–1	3–0	2–2	0–0	2–1	0–1	3–0	2–0	
Hapoel Bnei Ar'ara 'Ara	1–2	2–0	1–2	—	1–2	0–1	0–1	3–0	1–3	0–1	1–1	4–1	1–1	0–0	3–2	3–0
Hapoel Bnei Fureidis	4–1	3–0	1–0	0–4	—	1–3	6–0	3–2	4–0	1–1	3–1	2–3	2–2	4–0	1–2	
Hapoel Bnei Zalafa	3–2	3–0	1–1	0–1	0–0	—	5–0	0–1	1–0	1–1	0–2	1–0	2–0	1–0	0–1	2–0
Hapoel Daliyat al-Karmel	2–1	8–0	0–2	0–2	1–2	0–3	—	1–1	2–0	3–0 (Note: The match originally ended with Hapoel Tirat HaCarmel winning 3–2. As Tirat HaCarmel fielded an ineligible player, the match was given to Hapoel Daliyat al-Karmel.)	1–3	0–3	2–2	4–1	2–1	
Hapoel Ramot Menashe Megiddo	4–3	0–2	1–4	1–5	0–2	1–2	2–0	—	0–0	2–0	0–1	3–2	1–2	2–1	2–2	
Hapoel Sandala Gilboa	0–4	4–2	1–3	0–2	1–1	1–2	0–1	1–2	—	2–2	2–1	3–3	1–0	0–2	1–3	3–2
Hapoel Tirat HaCarmel	0–2	8–0	1–2	0–0	2–1	2–4	3–0	4–1	0–1	—	1–2	1–1	2–2	1–2	2–2	
Ihud Bnei Kafr Qara	0–3	3–0	2–1	0–0	0–0	1–1	2–1	4–1	3–4	1–0	—	0–0	2–0	6–1	1–2	
Maccabi Ahi Iksal	0–1	1–1	0–2	2–0	1–0	1–2	0–2	4–1	3–2	3–0	2–1	—	3–0	3–2	1–2	
Maccabi Bnei Reineh	3–0	4–1	0–0	3–0	0–3	0–1	4–0	1–2	0–2	2–0	1–2	2–0	—	1–2	2–1	
Maccabi Ein Mahil	3–0	3–3	0–0	1–2	2–0	0–4	2–2	3–3	0–3	0–10	0–1	1–8	2–4	—	1–0	2–0
Maccabi Nujeidat	1–2	2–1	0–3	0–2	1–0	0–3	2–0	2–4	1–3	4–1	1–1	0–3	4–3	1–3	—	2–0
Tzeirei Tur'an					3–2			2–7		0–3	2–2					—

Updated to match(es) played on 04 April 2018. Source: Liga B North B IFA (in Hebrew)
Legend: Blue = home team win; Red = away team win.

=== Positions by round ===
Team ╲ Round	1	2	3	4	5	6	7	8	9	10	11	12	13	14	15	16	17	18	19	20	21	22	23	24	25	26	27	28	29	30
Hapoel Bnei Zalafa	9	12	3	1	1	1	1	1	1	1	1	1	1	1	1	1	1	1	1	1	1	1	2	2	2	2	1	1	1	1
F.C. Daburiyya	11	5	4	3	3	5	4	5	7	3	3	2	2	2	2	2	2	2	2	2	2	2	1	1	1	1	2	2	2	2
Ihud Bnei Kafr Qara	7	3	9	6	5	3	2	2	2	4	4	7	4	4	3	3	3	4	3	3	3	3	3	3	3	3	3	3	3	3
Hapoel Bnei Fureidis	9	4	10	11	8	6	5	7	3	5	6	4	7	3	4	5	7	8	9	8	7	6	4	5	4	6	5	4	4	4
Maccabi Ahi Iksal	1	1	1	2	2	4	6	6	8	9	5	9	6	5	6	9	8	7	8	9	10	9	5	4	5	4	4	5	5	5
Hapoel Bnei Ar'ara 'Ara	7	13	13	12	13	11	8	11	14	14	12	13	11	13	10	11	9	9	7	6	8	7	9	9	9	7	6	6	6	6
Maccabi Nujeidat	5	10	11	13	9	7	9	9	11	10	11	8	5	7	8	8	4	3	5	5	5	4	6	7	8	10	11	11	9	7
Al-Nahda Nazareth	13	6	4	7	10	12	11	8	4	2	2	3	3	8	5	4	5	5	4	4	4	5	7	6	6	8	8	7	7	8
Maccabi Bnei Reineh	15	15	14	14	14	13	12	12	9	11	10	12	10	6	7	6	6	6	6	7	6	8	8	8	7	5	7	8	8	9
Hapoel R. Menashe Megiddo	16	8	7	10	12	14	14	14	13	13	15	15	14	14	14	13	13	13	13	11	11	11	11	10	10	9	9	9	10	10
Hapoel Sandala Gilboa	3	2	2	4	7	9	7	3	5	7	8	5	9	12	13	10	11	11	10	10	9	10	10	12	12	11	10	10	11	11
Hapoel Daliyat al-Karmel	4	9	6	8	11	8	12	13	10	6	7	10	12	10	9	12	12	10	11	12	13	12	12	11	11	12	13	12	12	12
Hapoel Tirat HaCarmel	5	10	8	5	4	2	3	4	6	8	9	6	8	9	11	7	10	12	12	14	14	14	14	14	14	14	14	14	14	13
Maccabi Ein Mahil	11	16	16	16	16	16	16	16	15	15	13	11	13	11	12	14	14	14	14	13	12	13	13	13	13	13	12	13	13	14
Beitar Pardes Hanna (Note: On 27 December 2017 Beitar Pardes Hana was expelled from the league after failing to appear to three matches. The club appealed and was re-instated on 10 January 2018.)	2	7	12	9	6	10	10	10	12	12	14	14	15	E	E	15	15	15	15	15	15	15	15	15	15	15	15	15	15	15
Tzeirei Tur'an	14	14	15	15	15	15	15	15	16	16	16	16	16	F	F	F	F	F	F	F	F	F	F	F	F	F	F	F	F	F

Source: IFA
E = Expelled; F = Folded

== South A Division ==
Liga Bet South A
- Season: 2017–18
- Champions: Shimshon Kafr Qasim
- Matches: 239
- Goals: 796 (3.33 per match)
- Top goalscorer: Yusef Abu Laban (Shimshon Kafr Qasim) (26)

Pos	Team	Pld	W	D	L	GF	GA	GD	Pts	Qualification or relegation
1	Shimshon Kafr Qasim	30	22	6	2	91	22	+69	72	Promoted to Liga Alef
2	F.C. Ironi Or Yehuda	30	18	8	4	80	34	+46	62	Promotion Playoffs
3	Tzeirei Tayibe	30	18	7	5	60	34	+26	61	Promotion Playoffs
4	Shimshon Tel Aviv	30	14	10	6	68	37	+31	52	Promotion Playoffs
5	Shimshon Bnei Tayibe	30	13	10	7	41	32	+9	49	Promotion Playoffs
6	Hapoel Ihud Bnei Jatt	30	12	13	5	62	41	+21	49	
7	Hapoel Kafr Qasim Shouaa	30	12	6	12	55	35	+20	42	
8	Ironi Beit Dagan	30	11	8	11	61	53	+8	41	
9	Amishav Petah Tikva	30	10	8	12	52	55	−3	38	
10	Beitar Petah Tikva	30	10	6	14	37	55	−18	36	
11	F.C. Roei Heshbon Tel Aviv	30	9	9	12	38	67	−29	36	
12	Bnei Jaffa Ortodoxim	30	8	12	10	41	37	+4	36	
13	Hapoel Kiryat Ono	30	7	13	10	28	34	−6	34	Relegation Playoffs
14	Hapoel Nahlat Yehuda	30	8	4	18	39	67	−28	28	Relegation Playoffs
15	Hapoel Pardesiya	30	3	9	18	36	59	−23	18	Relegation to Liga Gimel
16	A.S. Holon	30	0	1	29	10	137	−127	1	Relegation to Liga Gimel

Updated to match(es) played on 04 April 2018. Source: Liga B South A IFA (in Hebrew)
Rules for classification: 1) points; 2) number of wins; 3) head-to-head; 4) deciding match.

=== Results ===
Home \ Away	APT	ASH	BPT	BJO	IBJ	HKQ	HKO	HNY	HPA	IBD	IOY	RTA	SBT	SKQ	STA	TBE
Amishav Petah Tikva	—	5–0	2–2	1–1	1–3	0–2	1–1	3–1	4–2	1–1	2–2	2–1	1–2	1–0	0–5	0–2
AS Holon	1–4	—	0–5	1–4	1–3	1–10	0–2	0–3	0–0	0–8	0–6	1–2	0–3	1–8	0–6	1–6
Beitar Petah Tikva	2–7	1–0	—	1–1	0–1	1–2	2–0	0–0	1–1	2–1	1–5	0–2	0–2	1–1	3–3	0–4
Bnei Jaffa Ortodoxim	3–0	5–0	1–2	—	2–2	0–0	3–1	4–0	1–1	1–2	2–0	2–3	1–0	0–1	1–1	0–2
Hapoel Ihud Bnei Jatt	0–0	4–0	0–3	2–2	—	1–4	4–2	4–0	4–2	1–1	1–0	5–0	0–3	1–3	1–1	2–2
Hapoel Kafr Qasim Shouaa	3–0	3–0	0–2	4–0	0–0	—	1–1	7–2	2–0	3–0	0–1	2–2	2–1	0–0	2–5	0–3
Hapoel Kiryat Ono	0–0	3–0	1–0	0–0	1–2	0–0	—	2–2	0–0	1–0	1–3	0–0	0–1	1–2	1–4	1–1
Hapoel Nahlat Yehuda	2–4	6–0	3–2	0–1	0–6	0–2	0–2	—	2–0	0–4	2–2	0–1	0–0	1–0	3–2	0–1
Hapoel Pardesiya	2–3	10–0	2–3	0–0	0–0	2–1	0–0	0–2	—	2–2	1–5	2–1	2–3	0–1	1–3	2–4
Ironi Beit Dagan	4–3	3–0	0–1	4–1	2–2	1–0	0–2	3–1	3–3	—	3–4	2–2	2–1	1–3	0–1	0–3
Ironi Or Yehuda	2–0	9–1	2–0	2–2	4–4	3–2	1–1	3–2	3–0	3–2	—	5–0	2–0	1–1	2–0	1–0
Roei Heshbon Tel Aviv	1–3	3–1	1–2	2–1	0–6	2–1	1–1	2–4	1–0	2–2	1–6	—	1–1	0–6	2–2	0–0
Shimshon Bnei Tayibe	1–0	1–0	3–0	0–0	2–2	3–2	1–0	2–0	2–1	2–2	0–0	1–1	—	1–3	0–2	2–2
Shimshon Kafr Qasim	6–2	8–1	4–0	2–0	4–0	1–0	3–0	5–1	2–0	3–1	1–1	7–1	3–0	—	3–0	6–2
Shimshon Tel Aviv	1–1	3–0	5–0	1–1	0–0	2–0	1–1	3–1	3–0	3–4	2–1	1–3	1–1	2–2	—	1–2
Tzeirei Tayibe	2–1	3–0	1–0	2–1	1–1	1–0	1–2	2–1	3–0	2–3	2–1	1–0	2–2	2–2	1–4	—

Updated to match(es) played on 04 April 2018. Source: Liga B South A IFA (in Hebrew)
Legend: Blue = home team win; Red = away team win.

=== Positions by round ===
Team ╲ Round	1	2	3	4	5	6	7	8	9	10	11	12	13	14	15	16	17	18	19	20	21	22	23	24	25	26	27	28	29	30
Shimshon Kafr Qasim	8	2	2	2	1	2	2	2	2	1	1	1	1	1	1	1	1	1	1	1	1	1	1	1	1	1	1	1	1	1
Ironi Or Yehuda	1	1	1	1	2	3	3	3	3	4	4	3	2	2	2	2	2	3	2	2	2	2	2	2	2	2	2	2	2	2
Tzeirei Tayibe	6	7	5	4	3	1	1	1	1	2	2	2	3	3	3	3	3	2	4	4	3	3	3	3	3	3	3	3	3	3
Shimshon Tel Aviv	2	3	3	5	6	6	6	5	5	3	3	4	4	4	4	4	4	4	3	3	4	4	4	4	4	4	4	4	4	4
Shimshon Bnei Tayibe	4	6	8	9	9	11	11	11	10	6	5	6	6	9	6	5	6	7	7	7	7	8	7	7	5	6	7	6	6	5
Hapel Ihud Bnei Jatt	6	10	10	12	11	13	12	10	9	10	8	8	9	8	9	8	8	6	6	6	6	6	5	5	6	5	5	5	5	6
Hapoel Kafr Qasim Shouaa	14	9	9	7	7	7	8	6	6	9	10	9	7	5	5	6	7	8	8	9	10	7	8	8	9	8	8	8	8	7
Ironi Beit Dagan	3	5	4	3	5	5	4	4	4	5	7	5	5	7	8	7	5	5	5	5	5	5	6	6	7	7	6	7	7	8
Amishav Petah Tikva	9	11	14	11	10	8	7	8	12	8	9	10	12	10	10	10	12	11	11	11	11	11	11	11	11	10	10	11	10	9
Beitar Petah Tikva	12	12	12	10	12	9	9	9	7	7	6	7	8	6	7	9	9	9	9	8	8	10	10	9	8	9	9	9	9	10
Roei Heshbon Tel Aviv	16	16	11	13	13	10	10	13	13	13	14	14	14	13	13	13	13	13	13	13	13	13	14	14	13	12	12	12	11	11
Bnei Jaffa Ortodoxim	11	8	6	6	4	4	5	7	8	11	11	12	11	12	11	12	11	10	10	10	9	9	9	10	10	11	11	10	12	12
Hapoel Kiryat Ono	9	12	13	14	14	14	14	14	14	14	13	13	13	14	14	14	14	14	14	14	14	14	13	13	14	14	13	13	13	13
Hapoel Kiryat Ono	4	4	7	8	8	12	13	12	11	12	12	11	10	11	12	11	10	12	12	12	12	12	12	12	12	13	14	14	14	14
Hapoel Pardesiya	12	14	15	15	15	15	15	15	15	15	15	15	15	15	15	15	15	15	15	15	15	15	15	15	15	15	15	15	15	15
A.S. Holon	15	15	16	16	16	16	16	16	16	16	16	16	16	16	16	16	16	16	16	16	16	16	16	16	16	16	16	16	16	16

Source: IFA

== South B Division ==
Liga Bet South A
- Season: 2017–18
- Champions: A.S. Ashdod
- Matches: 238
- Goals: 719 (3.02 per match)
- Top goalscorer: Ariel Trabelsi (A.S. Ashdod) (28)

Pos	Team	Pld	W	D	L	GF	GA	GD	Pts	Qualification or relegation
1	A.S. Ashdod	30	25	5	0	84	15	+69	80	Promoted to Liga Alef
2	Maccabi Ashdod	30	20	8	2	60	15	+45	68	Promotion Playoffs
3	Maccabi Kiryat Malakhi	30	18	8	4	62	20	+42	62	Promotion Playoffs
4	Beitar Ma'ale Adumim	30	17	4	9	79	34	+45	55	Promotion Playoffs
5	F.C. Be'er Sheva	30	16	7	7	56	25	+31	55	Promotion Playoffs
6	Maccabi Ironi Sderot	30	12	7	11	42	39	+3	43	
7	Hapoel Yeruham	30	11	8	11	41	36	+5	41	
8	Ironi Modi'in	30	12	4	14	42	41	+1	40 (Note: Ironi Modi'in wins head-to-head against Maccabi Netivot (2–1, 2–0).)	
9	Maccabi Ironi Netivot	30	12	4	14	47	45	+2	40	
10	F.C. Shikun HaMizrah	30	11	4	15	47	41	+6	37	
11	Bnei Yeechalal Rehovot	30	10	7	13	34	53	−19	37	
12	Bnei Eilat	30	7	11	12	34	46	−12	32	
13	Beitar Giv'at Ze'ev	30	8	5	17	25	58	−33	29	Relegation Playoffs
14	Tzeirei Rahat	30	6	4	20	23	74	−51	22	Relegation Playoffs
15	Maccabi Be'er Sheva	30	4	8	18	31	55	−24	20	Relegation to Liga Gimel
16	Ironi Beit Shemesh	30	3	2	25	21	131	−110	11	Relegation to Liga Gimel

Updated to match(es) played on 11 April 2018. Source: Liga B South B IFA (in Hebrew)
Rules for classification: 1) points; 2) number of wins; 3) head-to-head; 4) deciding match.

=== Results ===
Home \ Away	ASA	BGZ	BME	BEL	BYR	FBS	SHM	HYE	IBS	IMO	MAS	MBS	MNV	MSD	MKM	MZR
A.S. Ashdod	—	6–0	1–0	3–1	6–0	3–1	1–0	3–1	3–0	3–1	0–0	4–0	5–1	2–0	2–0	5–1
Beitar Giv'at Ze'ev	1–3	—	1–1	0–3 (Note: The match originally ended with Bnei Eilat winning 1–0. As Beitar Giv'at Ze'ev fielded an ineligible player, the match result was set to a 3–0 victory to Beni Eilat.)	1–1	0–0	0–3	3–1	3–1	0–1	0–1	4–1	0–4	0–0	1–0	2–0
Beitar Ma'ale Adumim	1–2	6–0	—	6–1	0–1	4–3	2–0	3–0	11–1	6–2	1–1	1–2	0–2	0–2	3–1	3–0
Bnei Eilat	1–1	1–0	1–1	—	3–0	0–1	1–2	1–1	4–0	1–0	2–2	1–1	1–1	0–1	0–0	3–0
Bnei Yeechalal Rehovot	0–5	2–0	1–4	1–1	—	0–2	2–1	0–2	6–0	3–0	0–1	2–0	1–0	1–1	0–2	1–0
F.C. Be'er Sheva	0–1	4–0	1–4	3–1	5–0	—	2–4	0–0	4–0	1–0	1–2	1–0	0–0	0–0	0–0	1–0
F.C. Shikun HaMizrah	0–1	1–2	3–4	4–1	0–1	1–3	—	1–4	0–1	2–1	0–1	2–2	5–0	0–2	0–1	5–0
Hapoel Yeruham	1–2	2–1	1–2	2–1	2–0	0–0	0–1	—	2–0	1–1	0–2	1–1	3–0	1–0	1–1	0–0
Ironi Beit Shemesh	0–8	0–3	1–6	1–1	2–2	0–8	2–4	1–6	—	0–4	0–8	1–0	0–3	1–4	1–9	2–3
Ironi Modi'in	1–2	1–1	1–0	3–0	1–0	0–4	0–2	4–1	3–0	—	0–1	1–1	2–0	1–4	0–1	5–0
Maccabi Ashdod	1–1	1–0	1–0	4–0	2–2	3–0	1–1	3–0 (Note: The match originally ended with Maccabi Ashdod winning 1–0. As Hapoel Yeruham fielded an ineligible player, the match was given to Maccabi Ashdod as a 3–0 victory.)	6–0	2–3	—	1–0	2–0	4–1	0–0	3–0
Maccabi Be'er Sheva	0–5	0–1	1–3	1–1	4–4	1–2	1–1	0–1	4–0	0–2	0–2	—	1–2	3–1	0–3 (Note: The match originally ended with Maccabi Kiryat Malakhi winning 3–1. As Maccabi Be'er Sheva fielded an ineligible player, the match result was set to a 3–0 victory to Kiryat Malakhi.)	2–0
Maccabi Ironi Netivot	1–3	4–0	0–4	3–1	2–0	1–2	0–0	2–1	7–0	1–2	0–3	1–1	—	4–1	2–3	0–1
Maccabi Ironi Sderot	1–2	4–0	2–1	0–0	1–2	0–0	3–1	2–1	3–0	2–1	0–0	3–2	0–1	—	2–4	2–2
Maccabi Kiryat Malakhi	0–0	4–0	1–1	4–0	4–0	0–2	2–1	0–0	4–1	0–0	3–0	2–1	3–1	1–0	—	6–0
Tzeirei Rahat	1–1	2–1	0–1	0–2	1–1	0–5	0–2	1–5	2–5	2–1	0–2	2–1	0–4	4–0	1–3	—

Updated to match(es) played on 11 April 2018. Source: Liga B South B IFA (in Hebrew)
Legend: Blue = home team win; Red = away team win.

=== Positions by round ===
Team ╲ Round	1	2	3	4	5	6	7	8	9	10	11	12	13	14	15	16	17	18	19	20	21	22	23	24	25	26	27	28	29	30
A.S. Ashdod	4	3	4	2	2	2	2	2	2	2	1	1	1	1	1	1	1	1	1	1	1	1	1	1	1	1	1	1	1	1
Maccabi Ashdod	6	4	2	1	1	1	1	1	1	1	2	2	2	2	2	2	2	2	2	2	2	2	2	2	2	2	2	2	2	2
Maccabi Kiryat Malakhi	10	10	10	8	6	6	7	6	3	3	4	4	4	3	3	3	3	3	3	3	3	3	3	3	3	3	3	3	3	3
Beitar Ma'ale Adumim	15	6	5	3	4	4	4	5	4	4	5	5	5	5	4	4	4	5	4	5	5	5	5	5	5	5	5	5	4	4
F.C. Be'er Sheva	1	5	7	9	7	5	5	3	5	5	3	3	3	4	5	5	5	4	5	4	4	4	4	4	4	4	4	4	5	5
Maccabi Ironi Sderot	2	1	3	6	8	11	9	9	7	8	9	10	8	9	11	10	7	8	9	10	11	10	7	7	7	7	7	6	6	6
Hapoel Yeruham	12	6	6	5	3	3	3	4	6	6	7	7	7	7	7	7	6	7	6	6	6	6	6	6	6	6	6	7	8	7
Ironi Modi'in	10	14	14	16	16	16	16	12	9	7	6	6	6	6	8	9	10	9	7	8	9	11	9	9	10	9	9	8	7	8
Maccabi Ironi Netivot	4	8	9	12	11	9	6	7	8	10	12	9	9	8	6	6	8	6	8	9	7	9	11	11	11	10	11	10	9	9
F.C. Shikun HaMizrah	14	15	15	15	13	10	12	10	11	9	8	8	11	11	10	8	9	12	10	7	8	7	8	8	9	8	8	9	11	10
Bnei Yeechalal Rehovot	6	12	8	11	9	8	10	14	13	14	11	12	10	10	9	12	12	10	11	11	10	8	10	10	8	11	10	11	10	11
Bnei Eilat	8	9	11	13	15	15	15	16	16	16	16	15	14	12	12	11	11	11	12	12	13	13	13	13	13	13	13	13	13	12
Beitar Giv'at Ze'ev	2	2	1	4	5	7	8	8	10	11	13	13	13	14	14	15	14	13	14	13	12	12	12	12	12	12	12	12	12	13
Tzeirei Rahat	15	16	16	7	10	12	13	11	12	13	14	14	15	15	15	14	15	15	15	15	15	15	15	15	15	15	14	14	14	14
Maccabi Be'er Sheva	12	11	12	14	14	14	14	15	15	12	10	11	12	13	13	13	13	14	13	14	14	14	14	14	14	14	15	15	15	15
Ironi Beit Shemesh	8	12	12	10	12	13	11	13	14	15	15	16	16	16	16	16	16	16	16	16	16	16	16	16	16	16	16	16	16	16

Source: IFA

== Promotion play-offs ==
=== Northern Divisions ===
Division semi-finals
2	Ahva Kafr Manda	2
5	Tzeirei Kafr Kana	3
North A division
3	Hapoel Bu'eine	1
4	Ironi Bnei Kabul	2
2	F.C. Daburiyya	0
5	Maccabi Ahi Iksal	4
North B division
3	Ihud Bnei Kafr Qara	0
4	Hapoel Bnei Fureidis	3^{1}

Division final
5	Tzeirei Kafr Kana	0
4	Ironi Bnei Kabul	2
5	Maccabi Ahi Iksal	0
4	Hapoel Bnei Fureidis	2

Regional final
NA4	Ironi Bnei Kabul	0
NB4	Hapoel Bnei Fureidis	1

^{1}The match was abandoned at the 116th minute with Hapoel Bnei Fureidis leading 3–1 as Bnei Kafr Qara staff attacked the fourth official. The match was given as a walkover to Hapoel Bnei Fureidis, while Kafr Qara had two points deducted for the next season campaign.

=== Southern Divisions ===
Division semi-finals
2	Ironi Or Yehuda	3
5	Shimshon Bnei Tayibe	2
South A division
3	Tzeirei Tayibe	0
4	Shimshon Tel Aviv	3
2	Maccabi Ashdod	1 (5)
5	F.C. Be'er Sheva	1 (4)
South B division
3	Maccabi Kiryat Malakhi	4
4	Beitar Ma'ale Adumim	0

Division final
2	Ironi Or Yehuda	3
4	Shimshon Tel Aviv	1
2	Maccabi Ashdod	0
3	Maccabi Kiryat Malakhi	2

Regional final
SA2	Ironi Or Yehuda	0 (3)
SB3	Maccabi Kiryat Malakhi	0 (1)

=== Promotion play-off matches ===
==== North section ====
6 May 2017
18:00 UTC+3

Hapoel Migdal HaEmek	5–0	Hapoel Bnei Fureidis
Malul 36' (pen.); L. Cohen 67'; Amzaleg 70'; Sofer 76'; Y. Cohen 85'	Report

Ilut Stadium
Referee: Aviad Shiloah

==== South Section ====
6 May 2018
18:00 UTC+3

Hapoel Mahane Yehuda	3–1	Ironi Or Yehuda
Mizrahi 35'; Alberman 55'; Levy 90+5'	Report	56' Tamir

Ramat Gan Stadium
Referee: Ro'i Reinschreiber

== Relegation play-offs ==
North A

Relegation Playoffs			Test Match
			14	Sektzia Ma'alot	2 (4)
13	Ahva Arraba	1 (4)	LG	Maccabi Ironi Yafa	2 (1)
14	Sektzia Ma'alot	1 (3)

Sektzia Ma'alot remained in Liga Bet; Maccabi Ironi Yafa remained in Liga Gimel

South A

Relegation Playoffs			Test Match
			13	Hapoel Kiryat Ono	2
13	Hapoel Kiryat Ono	1	LG	Bnei Yehud	0
14	Hapoel Nahlat Yehuda	3

Hapoel Kiryat Ono remained in Liga Bet; Bnei Yehud remained in Liga Gimel

North B

Relegation Playoffs			Test Match
			14	Maccabi Ein Mahil	2
13	Hapoel Tirat HaCarmel	7	LG	Ihud Bnei Baqa	1
14	Maccabi Ein Mahil	1

Maccabi Ein Mahil remained in Liga Bet; Ihud Bnei Baqa remained in Liga Gimel

South B

Relegation Playoffs			Test Match
			14	Tzeirei Rahat	0
13	Beitar Giv'at Ze'ev	1	LG	Ironi Kuseife	2
14	Tzeirei Rahat	0

Tzeirei Rahat relegated to Liga Gimel; Ironi Kusiefe promoted to Liga Bet
