= 2016–17 Liga Gimel =

Israeli football season

The 2016–17 Liga Gimel season was the 49th season of fifth tier football in Israel, with 102 clubs competing in 8 regional divisions for promotion to Liga Bet.

== Review and events ==
- Towards the end of the season the minor leagues referees went on strike. As consequence, some matches were not played, while others were played with replacement referees or with partial staff. The IFA set the unplayed matches as 0–0 with no points awarded.

== Upper Galilee Division ==
Pos	Team	Pld	W	D	L	GF	GA	GD	Pts	Qualification or relegation
1	Bnei HaGoal VeHagalil	20	18	1	1	102	16	+86	55	Promoted to Liga Bet
2	Tzeirei Tamra	20	17	1	2	60	11	+49	52	Promoted to Liga Bet
3	Hapoel Merom HaGalil	20	12	2	6	45	35	+10	38	
4	Hapoel Bnei Tuba-Zangariyye	20	10	4	6	31	32	−1	33	
5	Hapoel Nahariya	20	8	3	9	52	63	−11	27	
6	Maccabi Ahva Sha'ab	20	7	4	9	36	44	−8	24	
7	Hapoel Bnei Hurfeish	20	5	5	10	33	63	−30	20	
8	Hapoel Tarshiha	20	5	4	11	26	47	−21	19	
9	Hapoel Bnei Bi'ina	20	4	5	11	23	58	−35	16	
10	Hapoel Bnei Peki'in	20	3	5	12	35	50	−15	14	
11	Maccabi Ahva Yarka	20	1	6	13	32	56	−24	8	
12	F.C. Aramshe Danun (Note: F.C. Aramshe Danun withdrew from the league.)	0	0	0	0	0	0	0	0	Folded
13	Hapoel Bnei Rameh (Note: Following a match between Hapoel Bnei Rameh and Bnei HaGolan VeHagalil, which was abandoned as Bnei Rameh players attacked the referee, the IFA disciplinary committee deducted 2 points from Bnei Rameh. Following the match Bnei Rameh withdrew from the league, and its record was expunged, along with the points deduction.)	0	0	0	0	0	0	0	0	Folded

Updated to match(es) played on 22 April 2017. Source: Liga Gimel Upper Galilee IFA (in Hebrew)
Rules for classification: 1) points; 2) number of wins; 3) head-to-head; 4) deciding match.
Notes:
- Two matches were not played and were given as a 0–0 without points: Hapoel Bnei Tuba-Zangariyye – Maccabi Ahva Yarka and Bnei Bi'ina – Maccabi Ahva Sha'ab.

== Lower Galilee Division ==
Pos	Team	Pld	W	D	L	GF	GA	GD	Pts	Qualification or relegation
1	Maccabi Nujeidat	18	15	0	3	55	8	+47	45	Promoted to Liga Bet
2	Maccabi Ironi Tamra	18	14	2	2	46	8	+38	44	
3	Ironi Bnei Sha'ab	18	12	1	5	49	17	+32	37	
4	Tzeirei Bir al-Maksur	18	10	2	6	45	26	+19	32	
5	Hapoel Ironi Bnei I'billin	18	8	2	8	39	43	−4	26	
6	Maccabi Kafr Manda	18	6	2	10	27	33	−6	20	
7	Maccabi Basmat Tab'un	18	5	5	8	23	40	−17	19 (Note: The 19th round match between Maccabi Basmat Tab'un and Bnei Deir al-Asad was abandoned at the 67th minute due to a brawl between the players. The match was set as a 0–0 without points awarded.)	
8	F.C. Kfar Kama	18	5	1	12	31	64	−33	15 (Note: F.C. Kfar Kama had one point deducted for fielding an ineligible player.)	
9	Hapoel Bnei Deir al-Asad	18	3	4	11	15	49	−34	12	
10	Beitar Kiryat Ata	18	2	1	15	24	66	−42	7	
11	F.C. Halat el-Sharif (Note: F.C. Halat el-Sharif failed to appear to three matches and were expelled for the league.)	0	0	0	0	0	0	0	0	Folded

Updated to match(es) played on 22 April 2017. Source: Liga Gimel Lower Galilee IFA (in Hebrew)
Rules for classification: 1) points; 2) number of wins; 3) head-to-head; 4) deciding match.

== Jezreel Division ==
Pos	Team	Pld	W	D	L	GF	GA	GD	Pts	Qualification or relegation
1	Maccabi Bnei Reineh	20	15	4	1	62	11	+51	49	Promoted to Liga Bet
2	Hapoel Bnei Musmus	20	13	5	2	35	8	+27	44	
3	Bnei Musheirifa Baiada	20	13	4	3	36	15	+21	43	
4	Beitar Afula	20	12	3	5	46	20	+26	39	
5	F.C. Nazareth Illit	20	11	4	5	43	26	+17	37	
6	Ahi Bir al-Maksur	20	9	2	9	26	37	−11	29	
7	Maccabi Ahi Arara 'Ara	20	6	5	9	37	45	−8	23	
8	Beitar Ein Mahil	20	5	4	11	25	39	−14	19	
9	Beitar Umm al-Fahm	20	3	4	13	15	33	−18	13	
10	Ihud Bnei Baqa	20	2	4	14	17	49	−32	9 (Note: The 17th round match between Ihud Bnei Baqa and Hapoel Ein as-Sahala was abandoned at the 70th minute due to a brawl between the players. The match was set as a 0–0 without points awarded.)	
11	Hapoel Ein as-Sahala	20	1	1	18	9	68	−59	3	

Updated to match(es) played on 14 April 2017. Source: Liga Gimel Jezreel IFA (in Hebrew)
Rules for classification: 1) points; 2) number of wins; 3) head-to-head; 4) deciding match.

== Samaria Division ==
Pos	Team	Pld	W	D	L	GF	GA	GD	Pts	Qualification or relegation
1	Hapoel Bnei Fureidis	22	16	5	1	60	21	+39	53	Promoted to Liga Bet
2	Beitar Pardes Hanna	22	16	4	2	57	17	+40	52	Promoted to Liga Bet
3	Hapoel Bnei Jisr az-Zarqa	22	13	3	6	47	36	+11	42	
4	F.C. Pardes Hanna-Karkur	22	11	9	2	60	25	+35	41	
5	Maccabi Neve Sha'anan	22	12	2	8	63	39	+24	38	
6	Hapoel Isfiya	22	8	3	11	41	63	−22	27	
7	Hapoel Or Akiva	22	7	4	11	34	41	−7	25	
8	Hapoel Ahva Haifa	22	7	3	12	46	51	−5	23	
9	Maccabi Ironi Barta'a	22	6	6	10	27	36	−9	23	
10	Hapoel Kiryat Haim	22	6	1	15	34	56	−22	19	
11	Hapoel Halissa	22	5	2	15	28	54	−26	17	
12	Hapoel Menashe	22	3	2	17	27	85	−58	10	

Updated to match(es) played on 4 May 2017. Source: Liga Gimel Samaria IFA (in Hebrew)
Rules for classification: 1) points; 2) number of wins; 3) head-to-head; 4) deciding match.
- Two matches weren't played and were given as a 0–0 without points: Hapoel Ahva Haifa – Maccabi Ironi Barta'a and Hapoel Menashe – F.C. Pardes Hanna-Karkur.

== Sharon Division ==
Pos	Team	Pld	W	D	L	GF	GA	GD	Pts	Qualification or relegation
1	Shimshon Kafr Qasim	24	21	2	1	74	14	+60	65 (Note: Shimshon Kafr Qaim wins head-to-head against Shimshon Bnei Tayibe (1–1; 3–2))	Promoted to Liga Bet
2	Shimshon Bnei Tayibe	24	21	2	1	107	16	+91	65	Promoted to Liga Bet
3	Bnei Qalansawe	24	16	2	6	68	26	+42	49	
4	Maccabi HaSharon Netanya	24	14	4	6	66	36	+30	45	
5	Bnei Ra'anana	24	13	3	8	64	46	+18	42	
6	Hapoel Oranit	24	11	5	8	41	43	−2	37	
7	Ironi Ariel	24	11	4	9	46	32	+14	37	
8	Hapoel Jaljulia	24	8	4	12	46	51	−5	27	
9	F.C. Netanya	24	7	5	12	32	55	−23	25	
10	Hapoel Kafr Bara	24	5	5	14	23	63	−40	19	
11	F.C. Tzeirei Tira	24	2	9	13	20	46	−26	15	
12	Beitar Tubruk	24	1	5	18	22	93	−71	8	
13	F.C. Kafr Qasim Nibrass	24	0	2	22	12	101	−89	2	

Updated to match(es) played on 28 April 2017. Source: Liga Gimel Sharon IFA (in Hebrew)
Rules for classification: 1) points; 2) number of wins; 3) head-to-head; 4) deciding match.
Notes:
- Four matches weren't played and were given as a 0–0 without points: Maccabi HaSharon Netanya – Bnei Qalansawe, Hapoel Oranit – Hapoel Kafr Bara, Hapoel Jaljulia – F.C. Netanya and F.C. Kafr Qasim Nibrass – Tzeirei Tira.

== Tel Aviv Division ==
Pos	Team	Pld	W	D	L	GF	GA	GD	Pts	Qualification or relegation
1	Ironi Beit Dagan	30	26	2	2	151	40	+111	80	Promoted to Liga Bet
2	Maccabi HaShikma Hen	30	22	4	4	124	35	+89	70	
3	Otzma Holon	30	18	8	4	98	40	+58	61	
4	Hapoel Neve Golan	30	17	7	6	85	49	+36	57	
5	Shikun Vatikim Ramat Gan	30	17	4	9	79	39	+40	55	
6	Bnei Yehud	30	15	7	8	76	42	+34	51	
7	Hapoel Abirei Bat Yam	30	14	4	12	115	75	+40	46	
8	AS Sporting Tel Aviv	30	10	9	11	68	70	−2	38	
9	Maccabi Spartak Ramat Gan	30	11	3	16	68	82	−14	36	
10	Inter Aliyah Tel Aviv	30	10	6	14	52	60	−8	35 (Note: Inter Aliyah wins head-to-head against Elitzur Yehud (2–1; 5–1))	
11	Elitzur Yehud	30	10	6	14	60	83	−23	35	
12	Maccabi Or Yehuda	30	9	4	17	46	72	−26	30	
13	Beitar Jaffa	30	9	4	17	37	82	−45	29	
14	Elitzur Jaffa Tel Aviv	30	7	4	19	70	121	−51	25	
15	Beitar Ezra	30	5	5	20	57	95	−38	19	
16	Maccabi Pardes Katz	30	1	1	28	33	234	−201	4	

Updated to match(es) played on 21 April 2017. Source: Liga Gimel Tel Aviv IFA (in Hebrew)
Rules for classification: 1) points; 2) number of wins; 3) head-to-head; 4) deciding match.
Notes:
- Five matches weren't played and were given as a 0–0 without points: Sporting Club – Maccabi Or Yehuda, Inter Aliyah – Bnei Yehud, Beitar Jaffa – Beitar Ezra, Elitzur Yehud – Ozmah Holon and Hapoel Neve Golan – Beitar Jaffa.

== Central Division ==
Pos	Team	Pld	W	D	L	GF	GA	GD	Pts	Qualification or relegation
1	A.S. Ashdod	24	22	1	1	143	18	+125	67	Promoted to Liga Bet
2	Maccabi Kiryat Ekron	24	20	1	3	90	32	+58	61	
3	Hapoel Gereda	24	17	1	6	83	30	+53	52	
4	Beitar Ashdod	24	16	3	5	77	34	+43	50	
5	Hapoel Bnei Ashdod	24	13	3	8	89	44	+45	41	
6	Ironi Lod	24	13	1	10	55	42	+13	39	
7	Tzeirei Lod	24	10	2	12	55	53	+2	31	
8	Hapoel Matzliah	24	9	1	14	47	71	−24	27	
9	Maccabi Rehovot	24	7	5	12	40	54	−14	25	
10	F.C. Rishon LeZion	24	6	4	14	47	82	−35	21	
11	Hapoel Tirat Shalom	24	4	4	16	33	69	−36	15	
12	Hapoel Mevaseret Zion	24	3	3	18	27	86	−59	11	
13	Hapoel Ramla	24	1	1	22	15	186	−171	3	

Updated to match(es) played on 28 April 2017. Source: Liga Gimel Central IFA (in Hebrew)
Rules for classification: 1) points; 2) number of wins; 3) head-to-head; 4) deciding match.
- Five matches weren't played and were given as a 0–0 without points: Hapoel Tirat Shalom – Tzeirei Lod, Hapoel Matliah – F.C. Rishon LeZion, Ironi Lod – Maccabi Rehovot, Beitar Ashdod – Hapoel Bnei Ashdod and Hapoel Mevaseret Zion – Hapoel Ramla

== South Division ==
Pos	Team	Pld	W	D	L	GF	GA	GD	Pts	Qualification or relegation
1	Hapoel Yeruham	24	22	1	1	107	16	+91	67	Promoted to Liga Bet
2	Beitar Kiryat Gat	24	18	4	2	89	23	+66	57	
3	Ironi Kuseife	24	12	5	7	57	50	+7	40	
4	Maccabi Ironi Hura	24	10	6	8	42	51	−9	35	
5	Hapoel Merhavim	24	11	1	12	55	46	+9	33	
6	Maccabi Dimona	24	9	4	11	41	60	−19	30 (Note: Maccabi Dimona wins head-to-head against A.S. Ashkelon (3–2; 3–2))	
7	A.S. Ashkelon	24	9	4	11	46	56	−10	30	
8	Elitzur Ironi Yehuda	24	9	2	13	55	60	−5	29	
9	Hapoel Rahat	24	8	3	13	36	62	−26	26	
10	F.C. Be'er Sheva Haim Levy	24	7	5	12	36	41	−5	26	
11	Hapoel Ar'arat an-Naqab	24	7	5	12	34	67	−33	24	
12	F.C. Arad	24	6	5	13	44	70	−26	23	
13	Tzeirei al-Hoshla	24	3	5	16	22	72	−50	13	

Updated to match(es) played on 28 April 2017. Source: Liga Gimel South IFA (in Hebrew)
Rules for classification: 1) points; 2) number of wins; 3) head-to-head; 4) deciding match.
Notes:
- Five matches weren't played and were given as a 0–0 without points: Tzeirei al-Hoshla – Hapoel Ar'arat an-Naqab, Hapoel Ar'arat an-Naqab – Maccabi Dimona, Ironi Kuseife – Hapoel Rahat, Beitar Kiryat Gat – A.S. Ashkelon and Hapoel Merhavi – Maccabi Ironi Hura
