= 2018–19 Liga Alef =

Liga Alef
- Season: 2018–19
- Champions: Hapoel Umm al-Fahm; F.C. Kafr Qasim

The 2018–19 Liga Alef season was the 10th season as third tier since its re-alignment in 2009 and the 77th season of third-tier football in Israel.

== Changes from last season ==
=== Team changes ===
- Hapoel Iksal and Sektzia Nes Tziona were promoted to Liga Leumit; Ironi Nesher (to North division) and Maccabi Herzliya (to South division) were relegated from Liga Leumit.
- Hapoel Beit She’an was relegated to Liga Bet from the North division, along with Maccabi Daliyat al-Karmet, who folded during the season. The two clubs were replaced by Hapoel Kaukab and Hapoel Bnei Zalafa, which were promoted to the North division from Liga Bet.
- F.C. Dimona and Hapoel Hod HaSharon were relegated to Liga Bet from South division and were replaced by Shimshon Kafr Qasim and Agudat Sport Ashdod (Hapoel Adumim Ashdod) which were promoted to the South division from Liga Bet.

== North Division ==
Liga Alef North
- Season: 2018–19
- Champions: Hapoel Umm al-Fahm
- Top goalscorer: Ohad Kadousi (Hapoel Baqa al-Gharbiyye) (27)

| Pos | Team | Pld | W | D | L | GF | GA | GD | Pts | Qualification or relegation |
|---|---|---|---|---|---|---|---|---|---|---|
| 1 | Hapoel Umm al-Fahm | 28 | 19 | 6 | 3 | 55 | 19 | +36 | 63 (Note: Hapoel Umm al-Fahm had two points deducted following its crowd rioting in a play-off match against Ironi Tiberias at the end of the 2017–18 season.) | Promotion to Liga Leumit |
| 2 | Hapoel Baqa al-Gharbiyye | 28 | 14 | 6 | 8 | 52 | 31 | +21 | 48 | Promotion Playoffs |
| 3 | Hapoel Herzliya | 28 | 13 | 7 | 8 | 40 | 34 | +6 | 46 | Promotion Playoffs |
| 4 | Hapoel Kaukab | 28 | 12 | 7 | 9 | 40 | 41 | −1 | 43 | Promotion Playoffs |
| 5 | F.C. Tira | 28 | 10 | 9 | 9 | 41 | 32 | +9 | 39 | Promotion Playoffs |
| 6 | Hapoel Bnei Zalafa | 28 | 9 | 10 | 9 | 32 | 33 | −1 | 37 | |
| 7 | Hapoel Kafr Kanna | 28 | 11 | 4 | 13 | 41 | 51 | −10 | 37 | |
| 8 | F.C. Haifa Robi Shapira | 28 | 11 | 3 | 14 | 39 | 28 | +11 | 36 | |
| 9 | Maccabi Ironi Kiryat Ata | 28 | 7 | 13 | 8 | 28 | 28 | 0 | 34 | |
| 10 | Hapoel Asi Gilboa | 28 | 10 | 4 | 14 | 35 | 43 | −8 | 34 | |
| 11 | Hapoel Migdal HaEmek | 28 | 9 | 7 | 12 | 28 | 38 | −10 | 34 | |
| 12 | Ironi Tiberias | 28 | 9 | 7 | 12 | 29 | 42 | −13 | 34 | |
| 13 | Maccabi Tzur Shalom | 28 | 9 | 6 | 13 | 26 | 31 | −5 | 33 | |
| 14 | Ironi Nesher | 28 | 10 | 3 | 15 | 31 | 44 | −13 | 33 | Relegation Playoffs |
| 15 | Hapoel Jerusalem | 28 | 9 | 4 | 15 | 28 | 50 | −22 | 31 (Note: Hapoel Jerusalem had three points deducted due to an outstanding debt to a former player.) | Relegation to Liga Bet |
| 16 | Hapoel Shefa-'Amr (Note: On 13 December 2018 The match between Hapoel Shefa-‘Amr and Hapoel Migdal HaEmek was cancelled as Hapoel Shefa-‘Amr failed to register the match with the IFA. On 2 January 2019 the IFA disciplinary tribunal decided to expel Hapoel Shefa-‘Amr from the league and to nullify its results.) | 0 | 0 | 0 | 0 | 0 | 0 | 0 | 0 | Folded |

Updated to match(es) played on 25 April 2019. Source: Liga Alef North IFA (in Hebrew)
Rules for classification: 1) points; 2) goal difference; 3) number of wins; 4) goals scored; 5) head to head; 6)deciding match.

== South Division ==
Liga Alef South
- Season: 2018–19
- Champions: F.C. Kafr Qasim
- Top goalscorer: Yossi Asayag (F.C. Kafr Qasim) (29)

| Pos | Team | Pld | W | D | L | GF | GA | GD | Pts | Qualification or relegation |
|---|---|---|---|---|---|---|---|---|---|---|
| 1 | F.C. Kafr Qasim | 30 | 23 | 3 | 4 | 62 | 17 | +45 | 72 | Promotion to Liga Leumit |
| 2 | Hakoah Amidar Ramat Gan | 30 | 22 | 4 | 4 | 48 | 18 | +30 | 70 | Promotion Playoffs |
| 3 | Maccabi Sha'arayim | 30 | 14 | 10 | 6 | 36 | 21 | +15 | 52 | Promotion Playoffs |
| 4 | Agudat Sport Ashdod | 30 | 14 | 8 | 8 | 52 | 39 | +13 | 50 | Promotion Playoffs |
| 5 | Maccabi Herzliya | 30 | 12 | 10 | 8 | 38 | 25 | +13 | 46 | Promotion Playoffs |
| 6 | Maccabi Jaffa Kabilio | 30 | 12 | 10 | 8 | 37 | 28 | +9 | 46 | |
| 7 | Maccabi Yavne | 30 | 12 | 8 | 10 | 41 | 35 | +6 | 44 | |
| 8 | F.C. Holon Yermiyahu | 30 | 11 | 9 | 10 | 29 | 24 | +5 | 42 | |
| 9 | Shimshon Kafr Qasim | 30 | 12 | 6 | 12 | 44 | 43 | +1 | 42 | |
| 10 | Nordia Jerusalem | 30 | 11 | 7 | 12 | 35 | 40 | −5 | 40 | |
| 11 | Hapoel Azor | 30 | 8 | 8 | 14 | 34 | 42 | −8 | 32 | |
| 12 | Hapoel Kfar Shalem | 30 | 6 | 14 | 10 | 31 | 48 | −17 | 32 | |
| 13 | Maccabi Kiryat Gat | 30 | 8 | 7 | 15 | 23 | 34 | −11 | 31 | |
| 14 | Hapoel Bik'at HaYarden | 30 | 5 | 9 | 16 | 25 | 52 | −27 | 24 | Relegation Playoffs |
| 15 | Hapoel Mahane Yehuda | 30 | 4 | 7 | 19 | 24 | 59 | −35 | 19 | Relegation to Liga Bet |
| 16 | Beitar Kfar Saba | 30 | 2 | 8 | 20 | 23 | 57 | −34 | 14 | Relegation to Liga Bet |

Updated to match(es) played on 25 April 2019. Source: Liga Alef South IFA (in Hebrew)
Rules for classification: 1) points; 2) goal difference; 3) number of wins; 4) goals scored; 5) head to head; 6)deciding match.

== Promotion play-offs ==
Regional semi-finals
N2 | Hapoel B. al-Gharbiyye | 3 (3)
N5 | F.C. Tira | 3 (1)
North division
N3 | Hapoel Herzliya | 2
N4 | Hapoel Kaukab | 0
S2 | Hakoah Ramat Gan | 4 (2)
S5 | Maccabi Herzliya | 4 (4)
South division
S3 | Maccabi Sha’arayim | 1 (5)
S4 | A.S. Ashdod | 1 (3)

Regional final
N2 | Hapoel B. al-Gharbiyye | 5
N3 | Hapoel Herzliya | 2
S5 | Maccabi Herzliya | 1 (3
S3 | Maccabi Sha’aryim | 1 (2)

Final
N2 | Hapoel B. al-Gharbiyye | 0
S5 | Maccabi Herzliya | 2

=== Test matches ===
26 May 2019
20:15

| Hapoel Acre | 4–3 | Maccabi Herzliya |
|---|---|---|
| Yuval Titelman 20'; Elior Seiderre 43', 60', 74' | | 3' Shivhon; 41', 84' (pen.)Assaf Levi |

Municipal Stadium, Acre
Referee: Ziv Adler

29 May 2019
19:00

| Maccabi Herzliya | 1–3 | Hapoel Acre |
|---|---|---|
| Amir Lavi 30' | | 45', 68', 90+4' Naor Abudi |

Municipal Stadium, Herzliya

Hapoel Acre won 7–4 on aggregate and remained in Liga Leumit. Maccabi Herzliya remained in Liga Alef.

== Relegation play-offs ==
=== North division ===
3 May 2019
15:00 UTC+3

| Ironi Nesher | 0–4 | Hapoel Bnei Ar'ara 'Ara |
|---|---|---|
| | Report | 20', 30' Jeish; 42' Sidawi; 61' Kabaha |

Ilut Stadium
Referee: Eitan Shemeulevitch

=== South division ===
10 May 2019
14:30 UTC+3

| Hapoel Bik'at HaYarden | 2––1 (a.e.t.) | Maccabi Sderot |
|---|---|---|
| Iluz 10'; Farhi 105' | Report | 57' (pen.) Amos |

Yud-Alef Stadium
Referee: Snir Levi
