= F.C. Tzeirei Lod =

Israeli football club

- Full name: Moadon Kaduregel Tzeirei Lod מועדון כדורגל צעירי לוד
- Founded: 2015
- Ground: Lod Synthetic Pitch
- Chairman: Uda Azbarga
- Manager: Amjad Azbarga
- League: Liga Gimel
- 2023–24: Liga Gimel Central, 13th

F.C. Tzeirei Lod (Hebrew: מועדון כדורגל צעירי לוד) is an Israeli football club based in Lod. The club currently plays in Liga Gimel Central division.

== History ==
The club was founded in 2015, building upon an informal gathering of players in HaRakevet neighborhood. At the players' request, Uda Azbarga, who was a player and chairman with Hapoel Rakevet Lod and, after the club's merger with Bnei Lod, in the management of Hapoel Bnei Lod, took over as chairman for the new founded club, which joined Liga Gimel. In its first season the club finished 9th in its division, improving to 7th in its second season.
