= Maccabi Ahva Yarka F.C. =

Israeli football club

Maccabi Ahva Yarka
- Full name: Maccabi Ahva Yarka F.C. מכבי אחווה ירכא مكابي الأخوة يركا
- Founded: 2013
- Dissolved: 2019
- Ground: Municipal Stadium, Yarka
- League: Liga Bet North A
- 2019–20: Liga Bet North A, 16th (folded)
Home colours	Away colours

Maccabi Ahva Yarka, (Hebrew: מכבי אחווה ירכא; Arabic: مكابي الأخوة يركا), is an Israeli football club based in Yarka. The club played in Liga Gimel Upper Galilee division during the 2015–16 season.

== History ==
The club was founded in 2013, replacing the former senior football club in Yarka, Otzma Bnei Yarka, which was closed in 2010. In its first season in Liga Gimel the club finished fourth, but achieved less success since, finishing 10th in its second season and 8th in its third.
