= Maccabi Nujeidat F.C. =

Israeli football club

Maccabi Nujeidat
- Full name: Maccabi Nujeidat Ahmad F.C. מכבי נוג'ידאת אחמד
- Founded: 2016
- Ground: Bu'eine Nujeidat Stadium
- Chairman: Jaidat Nujeidat
- Manager: Issa Nujeidat
- League: Liga Alef North
- 2023–24: Liga Alef North, 14th of 16
Home colours	Away colours

Maccabi Nujeidat F.C. (Hebrew: מכבי נוג'ידאת) is an Israeli football club based in Bu'eine Nujeidat. The club currently plays in Liga Bet North B division.

== History ==
The club was founded in 2016, following the demise of Hapoel Bnei Nujeidat and was named after local soldier Ahmad Nujeidat, who was killed in a car accident. In its first season the club finished 1st in its division and was promoted to Liga Bet.

== Honours ==
=== League ===
Honour	No.	Years
Fifth tier	1	2016–17
