= Hapoel Bnei Fureidis F.C. =

Israeli football club

Hapoel Bnei Fureidis
- Full name: Hapoel Bnei Fureidis F.C. הפועל בני פרדיס מ. עבדאלעאל
- Founded: 2010
- Ground: Fureidis Stadium
- Chairman: Naim Hawashi
- Manager: Rayan Taha
- League: Liga Alef North
- 2023–24: Liga Alef North, 15th (relegated)

Hapoel Bnei Fureidis F.C. (Hebrew: הפועל בני פוריידיס) is an Israeli football club based in Fureidis. The club currently plays in Liga Bet North B division.

== History ==
A club called Hapoel Fureidis played in the league since the early 1970s. The club was promoted, for the first time in its history, to Liga Bet at the end of the 1986–87 season, but relegated back to Liga Gimel at the end of the season. The club returned to Liga Bet ahead of the 1994–95 season, where the club played for eight seasons, before the club folded after relegating to Liga Gimel at the end of the 2001–02 season.

Hapoel Bnei Fureidis was established in 2010 and registered to play in Liga Gimel Samaria Division. In 2015–16 the club missed on promotion as it finished 2nd in the Jezreel division, six points behind league winners Hapoel Bnei Ar'ara 'Ara. The following season, the club was placed in the Samaria division and ran neck-to-neck with Beitar Pardes Hanna in the title race, eventually emerging as winners after beating Hapoel Bnei Jisr az-Zarqa 4–2 in the final match of the season.

In the State Cup, the club won its divisional cup in 2011–12 and advanced to the 6th round, where the club met Hapoel Asi Gilboa, losing 0–2.

== Honours ==
=== League ===
Honour	No.	Years
Fifth tier	1	2016–17

=== Cups ===
Honour	No.	Years
Liga Gimel divisional State Cup	1	2011–12
