= List of Hapoel Ra'anana A.F.C. seasons =

This is a list of seasons played by Hapoel Ra'anana Football Club in Israeli and European football, from 1939–40 (when the club first competed in the league) to the most recent completed season. It details the club's achievements in major competitions, and the top scorers for each season. Top scorers in bold were also the top scorers in the Israeli league that season. Records of minor competitions such as the Lilian Cup are not included due to them being considered of less importance than the State Cup and the Toto Cup.

== History ==
Hapoel Ra'anana was established in 1938 and played in the second division until relegating at the end of the 1955–56 season. The club played three further seasons in the second division in the late 1960s before spending its time in the lower divisions for the next decades. In 2001 the club returned to the second division. In 2009 the club was promoted for the first time to the top division, as the Premier League was expanded to 16 clubs. The club relegated after a season at the top division, but after three seasons was promoted again to the top division.

== Seasons ==
Season	League									State Cup	League Cup	International (Asia/Europe)	Top goalscorer (Note: Goals in all competitions (Liga Leumit or Liga Al, State Cup, Toto Cup and European) are counted.)	
Season	Division	P	W	D	L	F	A	Pts	Pos	State Cup	League Cup	International (Asia/Europe)	Name	Goals
1939–40	Bet North (2)								6th	R1	–	–		
1940–41	–	–	–	–	–	–	–	–	–	–	–	–		
1941–42	Bet North (2)	12	2	4	6	11	23	8	6th	–	–	–		
1942–43	–	–	–	–	–	–	–	–	–	–	–	–		
1943–44	–	–	–	–	–	–	–	–	–	–	–	–		
1944–45	–	–	–	–	–	–	–	–	–	–	–	–		
1945–46	–	–	–	–	–	–	–	–	–	–	–	–		
1946–47	Bet South (2)	16	6	0	10	34	35	12	7th	–	–	–		
1947–48	Bet South (2) (Note: The 1947–48 league was abandoned due to the 1948 Arab–Israeli War.)	4	1	1	2	4	12	3	10th	–	–	–		
1948–49	–	–	–	–	–	–	–	–	–	– (Note: The 1949 cup competition was delayed by appeals after the completion of the quarter-finals. After settling the appeals three further matches were played in February 1951, and the competition was abandoned.)	–	–		
1949–50	Meuhedet Sharon (2)	16	12	3	1	59	16	27	3rd	–	–	–		
1950–51	–	–	–	–	–	–	–	–	–	–	–	–		
1951–52	Bet South (2)	26	7	4	15	47	62	18	10th	R3	–	–		
1952–53	–	–	–	–	–	–	–	–	–	R2	–	–		
1953–54	Bet South (2)	26	7	7	12	43	73	21	10th	R2	–	–		
1954–55	Bet North (2)	20	11	2	7	47	39	24	4th	R3	–	–		
1955–56	Alef (2)	22	6	4	12	20	49	16	11th	–	–	–		
1956–57	Bet South (3)	24				34	44	19	10th	R5	–	–		
1957–58	Bet South (3)	21				33	30	16	10th	R3	–	–		
1958–59	Bet South (3)	22				26	41	16	9th	R3	–	–		
1959–60	Bet South (3)	30				60	54	32	8th		–	–		
1960–61	Bet North B (3)	30				41	46	27	10th		–	–		
1961–62	Bet North B (3)	30				54	41	29	7th		–	–		
1962–63	Bet North B (3)	30				50	68	27	8th		–	–		
1963–64	Bet North B (3)	30				75	27	46	2nd		–	–		
1964–65	Alef North (2)	30	8	6	16	26	58	22	16th	R3	–	–		
1965–66	Bet North B (3)	28				89	39	44	1st	Round of 16	–	–		
1966–67	Alef North (2)	60	21	12	27	103	106	54	10th	R6	–	–		
1967–68	Alef North (2)	60	21	12	27	103	106	54	10th	Round of 16	–	–		
1968–69	Alef North (2)	30	8	6	16	43	66	22	15th	R5	–	–		
1969–70	Bet North B (3)	30				52	49	32	6th	R4	–	–		
1970–71	Bet North B (3)	28				58	25	39	2nd	R2	–	–		
1971–72	Bet North B (3)	30				57	23	46	2nd		–	–		
1972–73	Bet North B (3)	30				49	37	35	4th		–	–		
1973–74	Bet North B (3)	30				82	49	35	6th	R3	–	–		
1974–75	Bet North B (3)	30				58	36	37	3rd	R1	–	–		
1975–76	Bet North B (3)	28				48	15	42	2nd (Note: Hapoel Ra'anana was placed in Liga Alef, which became third division upon the creation of Liga Artzit.)	R2	–	–		
1976–77	Alef North (3)	26	9	6	11	34	42	24	10th	R5	–	–		
1977–78	Alef North (3)	26	6	11	9	23	26	23	8th	R6	–	–		
1978–79	Alef North (3)	26	11	5	10	41	37	27	8th	R5	–	–		
1979–80	Alef North (3)	26	9	8	9	27	24	26	8th	R6	–	–		
1980–81	Alef North (3)	26				16	28	22	10th	R5	–	–		
1981–82	Alef North (3)	26				32	33	26	7th	R5	–	–		
1982–83	Alef North (3)	26	7	7	12	38	33	21	11th		–	–		
1983–84	Alef North (3)	26	6	11	9	26	28	23	9th	R5	–	–		
1984–85	Alef South (3)	26	6	10	10	17	28	22	12th		–	–		
1985–86	Alef North (3)	26				24	26	25	7th		–	–		
1986–87	Alef North (3)	26	11	10	5	29	20	32	2nd	R8	–	–		
1987–88	Alef North (3)	30	7	6	17	27	39	20	16th		–	–		
1988–89	Bet North B (4)										–	–		
1989–90	Bet North B (4)	26				26	28	26	4th	R7	–	–		
1990–91	Bet North B (4)	26				33	30	27	7th		–	–		
1991–92	Bet North B (4)	26				36	32	24 (Note: Hapoel Ra'anana had 2 points deducted.)	7th		–	–		
1992–93	Bet North B (4)	30				47	55	29	7th		–	–		
1993–94	Bet South A (4)	30				27	37	24	14th		–	–		
1994–95	Gimel Sharon (5)								1st	R7	–	–		
1995–96	Bet South A (4)	30	10	10	10	46	37	40	11th	R7	–	–		
1996–97	Bet South A (4)	30	13	9	8	46	33	48	6th		–	–		
1997–98	Bet South A (4)	30	18	7	5	66	20	61	1st		–	–		
1998–99	Alef North (3)	30	18	8	4	71	35	62	1st (Note: Hapoel Ra'anana was placed in Liga Artzit, which became third division upon the creation of the Israeli Premier League.)	R8	–	–		
1999–2000	Artzit (3)	33	19	4	10	63	34	61	3rd	R7	Final	–		
2000–01	Artzit (3)	33	16	7	10	40	29	55	1st	RInt	SF	–		
2001–02	Leumit (2)	33	9	11	13	40	52	38	9th	R8	R2	–		
2002–03	Leumit (2)	33	10	8	15	36	43	38	8th	Round of 16	Group	–		
2003–04	Leumit (2)	33	14	7	12	48	41	49	5th	R8	Group	–		
2004–05	Leumit (2)	33	11	8	14	37	40	41	9th	Round of 16	SF	–		
2005–06	Leumit (2)	33	8	12	13	31	36	36	9th	R9	Group	–		
2006–07	Leumit (2)	33	10	12	11	34	31	42	6th	R9	Group	–	Josué Martins	7
2007–08	Leumit (2)	33	11	13	9	34	31	46	7th	R9	Group	–	Serge Ayeli	10
2008–09	Leumit (2)	33	15	6	12	36	38	51	5th	R9	Group	–	Dudu Biton	12
2009–10	Premier (1)	35	6	10	19	33	58	18 (Note: Hapoel Ra'anana scored 20 points in the regular season, which were halved at the beginning of the play-offs. The club scored 8 more points during the play-offs for a total of 28 points.)	15th	R8	Final	–	Dudu Biton	12
2010–11	Leumit (2)	35	14	11	10	43	27	30 (Note: Hapoel Ra'anana scored 46 points in the regular season, which were halved at the beginning of the play-offs. The club scored 7 more points during the play-offs for a total of 53 points.)	5th	QF	Group	–	Raz Cohen	13
2011–12	Leumit (2)	35	14	9	12	43	47	31 (Note: Hapoel Ra'anana scored 48 points in the regular season, which were halved at the beginning of the play-offs. The club scored 3 more points during the play-offs for a total of 51 points.)	5th	R7	Group	–	Yossi Asayag	12
2012–13	Leumit (2)	37	20	10	7	56	33	70	2nd	Round of 16	Final	–	Mamadou Touré Thiam	21
2013–14	Premier (1)	33	9	11	13	31	40	38	9th	Round of 16	–	–	Mamadou Touré Thiam; Anthony Nwakaeme	7
2014–15	Premier (1)	33	10	9	14	35	36	39	10th	Round of 16	Group	–	Mamadou Touré Thiam	9
2015–16	Premier (1)	36	11	9	16	38	48	42	6th	Round of 16	Group	–	Evans Kangwa	11

== Key ==
- P = Played
- W = Games won
- D = Games drawn
- L = Games lost
- F = Goals for
- A = Goals against
- Pts = Points
- Pos = Final position
- Leumit = Liga Leumit (National League)
- Artzit = Liga Artzit (Nationwide League)
- Premier = Liga Al (Premier League)
- Pal. League = Palestine League
- F = Final
- Group = Group stage
- QF = Quarter-finals
- QR1 = First Qualifying Round
- QR2 = Second Qualifying Round
- QR3 = Third Qualifying Round
- QR4 = Fourth Qualifying Round
- RInt = Intermediate Round
- R1 = Round 1
- R2 = Round 2
- R3 = Round 3
- R4 = Round 4
- R5 = Round 5
- R6 = Round 6
- SF = Semi-finals

Champions	Runners-up	Promoted	Relegated
