= List of Hapoel Hadera F.C. seasons =

This is a list of seasons played by Hapoel Hadera Football Club in Israeli and European football, from 1939–40 (when the club first competed in the league) to the most recent completed season. It details the club's achievements in major competitions, and the top scorers for each season. Top scorers in bold were also the top scorers in the Israeli league that season. Records of minor competitions such as the Lilian Cup are not included due to them being considered of less importance than the State Cup and the Toto Cup.

== History ==
Hapoel Hadera was established in 1928, playing mostly friendly before joining the league in 1939. The club was first promoted to the top division in 1954, surviving only one season before relegation back to the second division. The club spent another seven seasons in the top division during the 1970s, before being relegated back to the lower divisions.

== Seasons ==
Season	League									State Cup	League Cup	International (Asia/Europe)	Top goalscorer (Note: Goals in all competitions (Liga Leumit or Liga Al, State Cup, Toto Cup and European) are counted.)	
Season	Division	P	W	D	L	F	A	Pts	Pos	State Cup	League Cup	International (Asia/Europe)	Name	Goals
1939–40	Bet North (2)								1st (Note: Hapoel Hadera participated in promotion play-offs as the 1st ranked team from the North division, and finished third, remaining in the second division.)	R1	–	–		
1940–41	–	–	–	–	–	–	–	–	–	R1	–	–		
1941–42	Bet North (2)	12	4	2	6	16	21	10	5th	R1	–	–		
1942–43	–	–	–	–	–	–	–	–	–	–	–	–		
1943–44	–	–	–	–	–	–	–	–	–	–	–	–		
1944–45	–	–	–	–	–	–	–	–	–	–	–	–		
1945–46	–	–	–	–	–	–	–	–	–	R1	–	–		
1946–47	Bet North (2)	24	14	2	8	68	34	30	3rd	R1	–	–		
1947–48	Bet North (2) (Note: The 1947–48 league was abandoned due to the 1948 Arab–Israeli War.)	3	3	0	0	11	2	6	1st	–	–	–		
1948–49	–	–	–	–	–	–	–	–	–	– (Note: The 1949 cup competition was delayed by appeals after the completion of the quarter-finals. After settling the appeals three further matches were played in February 1951, and the competition was abandoned.)	–	–		
1949–50	Meuhedet Samaria (2)	16	13	2	1	46	9	28	1st	–	–	–		
1950–51	–	–	–	–	–	–	–	–	–	–	–	–		
1951–52	Bet North (2)	22	18	2	2	80	14	38	2nd	R3	–	–		
1952–53	–	–	–	–	–	–	–	–	–	R2	–	–		
1953–54	Bet North (2)	20	19	0	1	81	17	38	1st	R2	–	–		
1954–55	Alef (1)	26	7	2	17	36	53	16	13th	QF	–	–		
1955–56	Alef (2)	22	9	2	11	42	38	20	7th	–	–	–		
1956–57	Alef (2)	22	11	7	4	42	24	29	4th (Note: The IFA ordered the top five placed clubs to play a promotion playoffs. Hapoel Hadera finished joint-third in the playoffs and was to play a deciding match against Hakoah Tel Aviv to determine who would be placed third, and qualify to a test match against 10th placed club in Liga Leumit, Maccabi Jaffa, but forfeited the match in protest of the IFA handling the participation of Maccabi Rehovot in the promotion playoffs.)	R6	–	–		
1957–58	Alef (2)	20	6	6	8	26	30	18	8th	R6	–	–		
1958–59	Alef (2)	22	8	3	11	33	33	19	8th	R6	QF	–		
1959–60	Alef (2)	22	8	7	11	33	32	23	11th	R7	–	–		
1960–61	Alef (2)	26	7	6	13	33	41	20	13th	R7	–	–		
1961–62	Bet North B (3)	30				74	13	51	1st	R4	–	–		
1962–63	Alef (2)	30	9	9	12	33	30	27	8th		–	–		
1963–64	Alef North (2)	26	14	10	2	40	12	37 (Note: Hapoel Hadera had one point deducted.)	2nd	R5	–	–		
1964–65	Alef North (2)	30	12	7	11	47	39	31	5th	R5	–	–		
1965–66	Alef North (2)	30	12	10	8	29	28	34	4th	R4	–	–		
1966–67	Alef North (2)	60	23	15	22	72	65	61	4th	R6	–	–		
1967–68	Alef North (2)	60	23	15	22	72	65	61	4th	R5	–	–		
1968–69	Alef North (2)	30	16	9	5	54	26	41	2nd	R6	–	–		
1969–70	Alef North (2)	30	18	7	5	41	20	43	1st	R5	–	–		
1970–71	Leumit (1)	30	6	13	11	21	28	25	14th	Round of 16	–	–		
1971–72	Leumit (1)	30	3	11	16	13	32	17	16th	R6	–	–		
1972–73	Alef North (2)	30	19	8	3	59	18	46	1st	Round of 16	Group	–		
1973–74	Leumit (1)	30	6	15	9	24	32	27	13th	R5	–	–		
1974–75	Leumit (1)	30	9	13	8	30	26	31	7th	SF	–	–		
1975–76	Leumit (1)	34	6	13	15	20	44	25	16th	R4	Winners	–		
1976–77	Artzit (2)	22	13	7	2	41	24	33	1st	QF	–	–		
1977–78	Leumit (1)	26	9	6	11	32	41	24	11th	Round of 16	–	–		
1978–79	Leumit (1)	30	10	5	15	35	44	25	14th	QF	–	–		
1979–80	Artzit (2)	30	7	14	9	23	25	26	12th	Round of 16	–	–		
1980–81	Artzit (2)	30	4	14	12	21	33	22	14th	Round of 16	–	–		
1981–82	Alef North (3)	26				47	25	43	1st	R6	–	–		
1982–83	Artzit (2)	30	9	11	10	48	45	38	8th	R7	–	–		
1983–84	Artzit (2)	30	11	12	7	35	29	45	5th	R7	–	–		
1984–85	Artzit (2)	30	13	9	8	44	32	48	5th	R6	Group	–		
1985–86	Artzit (2)	30	12	8	10	36	32	44	6th		Winners	–		
1986–87	Artzit (2)	30	13	9	8	40	36	48	4th	Round of 16	Group	–		
1987–88	Artzit (2)	33	13	8	12	50	45	47	5th		Group	–		
1988–89	Artzit (2)	31	12	9	10	35	34	45	5th		Winners	–		
1989–90	Artzit (2)	30	8	9	13	37	46	33	13th	R7	Final Group	–		
1990–91	Artzit (2)	30	10	10	10	32	39	40	9th		Group	–		
1991–92	Artzit (2)	30	10	8	12	33	35	38	8th		Group	–		
1992–93	Artzit (2)	30	8	11	11	29	35	35	14th		Final Group	–		
1993–94	Artzit (2)	30	15	9	6	48	27	42 (Note: Hapoel Hadera had 12 points deducted.)	8th		Group	–		
1994–95	Artzit (2)	30	11	5	14	39	44	38	11th	R7	Group	–		
1995–96	Artzit (2)	30	10	8	12	30	38	38	11th	R7	Group	–		
1996–97	Artzit (2)	30	5	11	14	27	42	26	16th		Final	–		
1997–98	Alef North (3)	30	8	15	7	30	28	39	7th	R8	–	–		
1998–99	Alef North (3)	30	11	7	12	45	43	40	10th		–	–		
1999–2000	Alef North (4)	24	15	4	5	51	25	49	2nd		–	–		
2000–01	Alef North (4)	26	17	4	5	65	26	55	2nd		–	–		
2001–02	Alef North (4)	26	11	9	6	30	20	42	5th		–	–		
2002–03	Alef North (4)	26	8	4	14	40	54	28	13th		–	–		
2003–04	Bet South A (5)	30	11	7	12	41	33	40	9th		–	–		
2004–05	Bet South A (5)	28	8	12	8	32	36	36	10th		–	–		
2005–06	Bet South A (5)	30	13	5	12	43	37	44	8th		–	–		
2006–07	Bet South A (5)	30	11	9	10	58	42	42	6th	R1		–	Oren Muharer	15
2007–08	Bet South A (5)	30	20	8	2	60	19	68	1st	R9	–	–	Yakir Hasson	18
2008–09	Alef South (4)	26	15	2	9	43	25	47	4th	R6	–	–	Idan David	13
2009–10	Alef South (3)	30	16	5	9	40	32	53	3rd	R7	–	–	Idan David	15
2010–11	Alef North (3)	30	11	7	12	48	46	40	8th	R6	–	–	Sabi Shaulov	15
2011–12	Alef North (3)	30	8	8	14	34	48	32	14th (Note: Hapoel Hadera played a promotion/relegation playoff against F.C. Tzeirei Bir al-Maksur and won 2–1 to remain in Liga Alef.)	R5	–	–	Kobi Badash	12
2012–13	Alef North (3)	30	10	7	13	42	40	37	7th	R5	–	–	Sabi Shaulov; Adam Vayer	8
2013–14	Alef North (3)	30	13	5	12	46	45	44	7th	R7	–	–	Salim Amash	12
2014–15	Alef North (3)	30	10	7	13	39	38	37	9th	R5	–	–	Sahar Azulai; Salim Amash	7
2015–16	Alef North (3)	30	16	8	6	52	31	56	2nd (Note: Hapoel Hadera played in a promotion playoffs, beating Ironi Kiryat Ata 2–1 in the first round and Ironi Tiberias 3–0 in the second round before losing to F.C. Kafr Qasim on penalties in the third round.)	R5	–	–	Asi Guma	17

== Key ==
- P = Played
- W = Games won
- D = Games drawn
- L = Games lost
- F = Goals for
- A = Goals against
- Pts = Points
- Pos = Final position
- Leumit = Liga Leumit (National League)
- Artzit = Liga Artzit (Nationwide League)
- Premier = Liga Al (Premier League)
- Pal. League = Palestine League
- F = Final
- Group = Group stage
- QF = Quarter-finals
- QR1 = First Qualifying Round
- QR2 = Second Qualifying Round
- QR3 = Third Qualifying Round
- QR4 = Fourth Qualifying Round
- RInt = Intermediate Round
- R1 = Round 1
- R2 = Round 2
- R3 = Round 3
- R4 = Round 4
- R5 = Round 5
- R6 = Round 6
- SF = Semi-finals

Champions	Runners-up	Promoted	Relegated
