= List of Maccabi Haifa F.C. seasons =

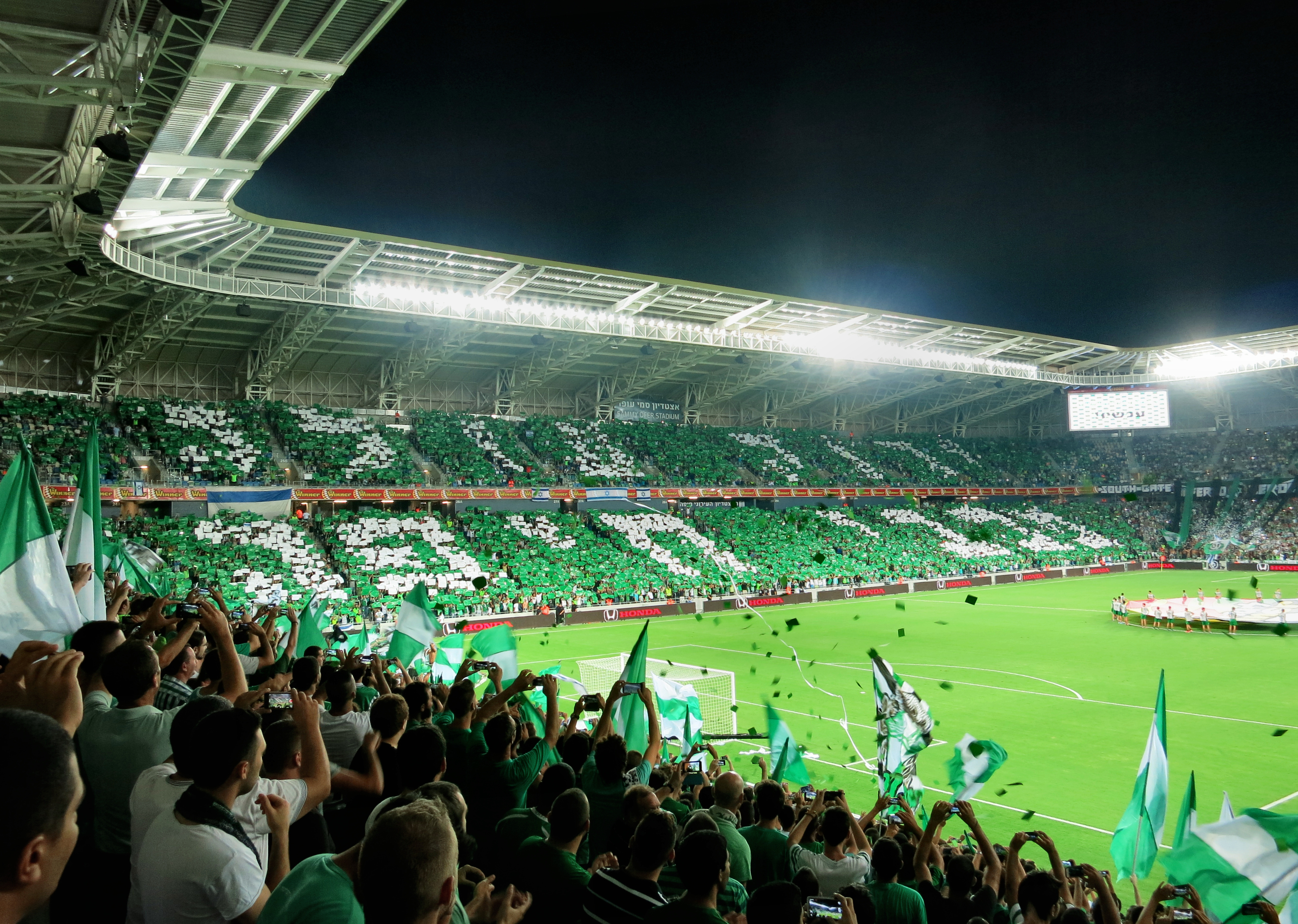
Maccabi Haifa fans

This is a list of seasons played by Maccabi Haifa Football Club in Israeli and European football, from 1949 (first edition of the Israeli League.) to the most recent completed season. It details the club's achievements in major competitions, and the top scorers for each season. Top scorers in bold were also the top scorers in the Israeli league that season. Records of minor cup competitions, such as the Lilian Cup and the Israel Super Cup are not included due to them being considered of less importance than the State Cup and the Toto Cup.

The club has won the League Championship thirteen times, the State Cup six times and the Toto Cup four times. The club has never been out of the top two divisions of Israeli football.

== History ==
Maccabi Haifa Football Club was established in 1913 in the port city of Haifa. It was a small, struggling club that spent most of its time bouncing between the Liga Leumit and the lower leagues. The club was given a bye to the final of a 1923 competition called The Hebrew Cup, which it lost to Maccabi Nes Tziona 0–2. In 1942, the club reached the State Cup final, but was humiliated 12-1 by Beitar Tel Aviv in the final, which is the club's worst defeat ever. In 1962, the club won its only honour until the 80s, when the team defeated Maccabi Tel Aviv 5-2 in the State Cup final. In 1963 they reached the final again, but failed to defend their title losing to arch-rivals Hapoel Haifa 1-0.

== Seasons ==
Table correct as of 23 July 2025

Season	League									State Cup	Toto Cup	Europe		Top goalscorer	
Season	Division	P	W	D	L	F	A	Pts	Pos	State Cup	Toto Cup	Europe		Top goalscorer	
1949/1950	Israeli League	24	12	1	11	60	46	24	7th	DNP	Not held	DNP	-	(Austria) Otto Schlefenberg	9
1951-52	Liga Alef	22	6	5	11	33	54	17	10th	DNP	Not held	DNP	-	(Israel) Jonny Hardy	7
1953-54	Liga Alef	22	8	3	11	25	51	19	8th	Quarter-finals	Not held	DNP	-	(Israel) Zecharya Ben-Zvi	6
1954-55	Liga Alef	26	11	6	9	54	41	28	8th	Semi-finals	Not held	DNP	-	(Israel) Yeshayahu Held	20
1955-56	Liga Leumit	22	11	3	8	51	29	28	6th	Cancelled	Not held	DNP	-	(Israel) Shlomo Levi	15
1956-57	Liga Leumit	18	8	3	7	34	27	19	5th	Quarter-final	Not held	DNP	-	Jonny Hardy	8
1957-58	Liga Leumit	22	12	3	7	42	24	27	3rd	Seventh round	Not held	DNP	-	(Israel) Shlomo Levi	10
1958-59	Liga Leumit	22	14	1	7	47	24	29	5th	Semi-finals	Not held	DNP	-	(Israel) Aharon Amar	10
1959-60	Liga Leumit	22	7	10	5	42	30	24	5th	Cancelled	Not held	DNP	-	(Israel) Avraham Menchel	18
1960-61	Liga Leumit	22	11	3	8	40	33	25	5th	Semi-finals	Not held	DNP	-	(Israel) Danny Shmulevich-Rom	12
1961-62	Liga Leumit	22	11	3	8	45	34	25	4th	**Winner**	Not held	DNP	-	(Israel) Avraham Menchel	17
1962-63	Liga Leumit	22	8	5	9	36	41	19	9th	**Runners-up**	Not held	DNP	-	(Israel) Danny Shmulevich-Rom	15
1963-64	Liga Leumit	28	8	7	13	23	47	19	13th	Semi-finals	Not held	DNP	-	(Israel) Danny Shmulevich-Rom	12
1964-65	Liga Leumit	30	8	8	14	42	44	24	**15th**	Fourth Round	Not held	DNP	-	(Israel) Yonatan Zvi	10
1965-66	Liga Alef	30	24	4	6	66	9	52	**1st**	Semi-Final	Not held	DNP	-	(Israel) Aharon Gershgoren (Israel) Hasan Bustuni	13
1966-68	Liga Leumit	60	26	15	19	55	43	67	5th	Seventh Round; Sixth Round	Not held	DNP	-	(Israel) Danny Shmulevich-Rom	16
1968-69	Liga Leumit	30	13	7	10	36	35	33	5th	Quarter-finals	Not held	DNP	-	(Israel) Haim Forta	8
1969-70	Liga Leumit	30	10	13	7	29	24	33	3rd	Seventh Round	Not held	DNP	-	(Israel) Nathan Hirsch	7
1970-71	Liga Leumit	30	6	14	10	20	26	26	12th	**Runners-up**	Not held	DNP	-	(Israel) Yoav Levi	8
1971-72	Liga Leumit	30	10	11	9	31	33	31	7th	Semi-finals	Not held	DNP	-	(Israel) Yehiam Sharabi	9
1972-73	Liga Leumit	30	8	13	9	29	36	29	11th	Quarter-finals	Not held	DNP	-	(Israel) Moshe Agami	8
1973-74	Liga Leumit	30	9	6	15	33	41	23	**16th**	Fifth Round	Not held	DNP	-	(Israel) Moshe Agami	13
1974-75	Liga Alef	30	16	9	5	39	18	41	**1st**	Quarter-final	Not held	DNP	-	(Israel) Moshe Adlar	15
1975-76	Liga Leumit	34	10	15	9	28	27	35	9th	Round of 16	Not held	DNP	-	(Israel) Baruch Maman (Israel) Simon Kuzia	6
1976-77	Liga Leumit	33	7	10	13	25	42	24	**15th**	Round of 16	Not held	DNP	-	(Israel) Shaul Haik	7
1977-78	Liga Artzit	26	9	7	10	32	31	25	6th	Quarter-final	Not held	DNP	-	(Israel) Menashe Mizrahi	8
1978-79	Liga Artzit	30	11	10	9	34	32	32	5th	Round of 16	Not held	DNP	-	(Israel) Menashe Mizrahi	9
1979-80	Liga Artzit	30	12	7	11	29	25	31	7th	Quarter-final	Not held	DNP	-	(Israel) Menashe Mizrahi	11
1980-81	Liga Artzit	30	18	8	4	51	22	44	3rd	Semi-Final	Not held	DNP	-	(Israel) Hilel Kaplan	13
1981-82	Liga Leumit	30	9	12	9	32	32	30	7th	Quarter-final	Not held	DNP	-	(Israel) Eli Miali	10
1982-83	Liga Leumit	30	8	14	8	31	31	38	6th	Semi-Final	Not held	DNP	-	(Israel) Moshe Selecter	17
1983-84	Liga Leumit	30	16	9	5	48	28	57	**1st**	Round of 16	Not held	DNP	-	(Israel) Zahi Armeli	14
1984-85	Liga Leumit	33	20	5	5	57	20	65	**1st**	**Runners-up**	Group stage	DNP	-	(Israel) Zahi Armeli	17
1985-86	Liga Leumit	30	16	9	5	47	18	57	**2nd**	Quarter-final	Group stage	DNP	-	(Israel) Zahi Armeli	14
1986-87	Liga Leumit	30	9	12	9	34	28	39	9th	**Runners-up**	Group stage	DNP	-	(Israel) Zahi Armeli	14
1987-88	Liga Leumit	31	13	8	10	56	33	49	9th	Round of 16	Group stage	DNP	-	(Israel) Zahi Armeli	26
1988–89	Liga Leumit	31	15	14	2	49	19	57	**1st**	**Runners-up**	Group stage	DNP	-	(Israel) Zahi Armeli	15
1989-90	Liga Leumit	32	14	8	10	40	29	30	3rd	Round of 16	Group stage	DNP	-	(Israel) Offer Mizrahi	13
1990-91	Liga Leumit	32	22	5	5	56	28	71	**1st**	**Winner**	Semi-Final	DNP	-	(Israel) Reuven Atar	17
1991-92	Liga Leumit	32	14	6	12	51	43	48	3rd	Semi-Final	Group stage	DNP	-	(Israel) Itay Mordehai	14
1992-93	Liga Leumit	33	12	11	10	55	46	45	5th	**Winner**	Group stage	DNP	-	(Soviet Union) Ivan Hetsko	15
1993-94	Liga Leumit	39	28	11	0	97	27	95	**1st**	Round of 16	**Winner**	Winners' Cup	2R	(Israel) Alon Mizrahi	35
1994-95	Liga Leumit	30	17	6	7	68	34	58	**2nd**	**Winner**	**Winner**	Champions League	QR	(Israel) Haim Revivo	20
1995-96	Liga Leumit	30	19	9	2	74	31	66	**2nd**	Semi-Final	**Runners-up**	Winners' Cup	1R	(Israel) Haim Revivo	30
1996-97	Liga Leumit	30	13	9	8	48	34	48	5th	Quarter-final	Semi-Final	UEFA Cup	PR	(Israel) Hezi Shirazi	14
1997-98	Liga Leumit	30	15	7	8	49	34	52	4th	**Winner**	Group stage	Intertoto Cup	GS	(Israel) Alon Mizrahi	25
1998-99	Liga Leumit	30	19	3	8	62	24	60	3rd	Quarter-final	Group stage	Winners' Cup	QF	(Israel) Alon Mizrahi	21
1999-00	Ligat HaAl	39	22	9	2	86	35	52	**2nd**	Semi-Final	**Runners-up**	Intertoto Cup	FR	(Israel) Rafi Cohen	22
2000-01	Ligat HaAl	38	24	10	4	68	28	82	**1st**	Semi-Final	Second round	UEFA Cup	1R	(Israel) Yossi Benayoun	15
2001-02	Ligat HaAl	33	22	9	3	72	32	75	**1st**	**Runners-up**	Quarter-final	Champions League	QR2	(Nigeria) Yakubu Aiyegbeni	16
2002-03	Ligat HaAl	33	21	6	6	75	42	69	**2nd**	Semi-Final	**Winner**	Champions League; UEFA Cup	GS; 3R	(Israel) Michael Zandberg	17
2003-04	Ligat HaAl	33	19	6	8	54	25	63	**1st**	Quarter-final	**Runners-up**	UEFA Cup	2R	(Israel) Walid Badir	14
2004-05	Ligat HaAl	33	21	8	4	66	27	71	**1st**	Round of 16	Semi-Final	Champions League; UEFA Cup	QR3; 1R	(Israel) (Argentina) Roberto Colautti	19
2005-06	Ligat HaAl	33	23	6	4	65	25	75	**1st**	Semi-Final	**Winner**	Champions League	QR2	(Israel) (Argentina) Roberto Colautti	16
2006-07	Ligat HaAl	33	14	9	10	45	39	51	5th	Quarter-final	Group stage	Champions League; UEFA Cup	QR3; R16	(Israel) (Argentina) Roberto Colautti	13
2007–08	Ligat HaAl	33	13	8	12	38	27	47	5th	Round of 16	**Winner**	Intertoto Cup	2R	(South Africa) Thembinkosi Fanteni	7
2008–09	Ligat HaAl	33	19	10	4	49	24	67	**1st**	**Runners-up**	Quarter-final	DNP	-	(South Africa) Thembinkosi Fanteni	16
2009–10	Ligat HaAl	35	28	3	4	72	16	87	**2nd**	Round of 16	Semi-Final	Champions League	GS	(Israel) Shlomi Arbeitman	30
2010-11	Ligat HaAl	35	24	8	3	63	28	45	**1st**	**Runners-up**	Quarter-final	Europa League	3R	(Israel) Tomer Hemed	16
2011-12	Ligat HaAl	37	16	10	11	56	44	58	5th	**Runners-up**	Group stage	Champions League; Europa League	PO; GS	(Israel) Weaam Amasha	21
2012-13	Ligat HaAl	36	19	10	7	41	20	67	**2nd**	Semi-Final	Quarter-Final	DNP	-	(South Africa) Dino Ndlovu	15
2013-14	Ligat HaAl	36	15	8	13	49	46	53	5th	Round of 32	Cancelled	Europa League	GS	(Israel) Alon Turgeman	19
2014-15	Ligat HaAl	36	14	8	14	51	37	50	5th	Round of 16	**Runners-up**	DNP	-	(Spain) Rubén Rayos	12
2015-16	Ligat HaAl	36	14	11	11	45	42	53	4th	**Winner**	Quarter-final	DNP	-	(Netherlands) Glynor Plet	15
2016-17	Ligat HaAl	36	12	9	15	34	41	45	6th	Round of 32	Quarter-final	Europa League	QR2	(Israel) Eliran Atar	7
2017-18	Ligat HaAl	33	10	8	15	38	39	38	10th	Quarter-final	Semi-final	DNP	-	(Australia) (Israel) Nikita Rukavytsya	15
2018-19	Ligat HaAl	36	16	10	10	46	41	58	**2nd**	Round of 16	**Runners-up**	DNP	-	(Australia) (Israel) Nikita Rukavytsya	12
2019-20	Ligat HaAl	36	22	7	7	73	32	73	**2nd**	Quarter-final	7th	Europa League	QR2	(Australia) (Israel) Nikita Rukavytsya	24
2020-21	Ligat HaAl	36	24	7	5	72	29	79	**1st**	Semi-final	6th	Europa League	PO	(Australia) (Israel) Nikita Rukavytsya	23
2021-22	Ligat HaAl	36	24	6	6	79	27	78	**1st**	**Runners-up**	**Winner**	Champions League; Conference League	First qualifying round Group stage	(Israel) Omer Atzili	27
2022-23	Ligat HaAl	36	27	3	6	76	34	81	**1st**	**Quarter-finals**	5th	Champions League	Group stage	(Israel) Omer Atzili	26
2023-24	Ligat HaAl	36	23	7	6	75	28	74	**2nd**	**Quarter-finals**	**Runners-up**	Champions League; Europa League; Conference League	Play off round Group stage R16	(Israel) Dean David	20
2024-25	Ligat HaAl	36	18	8	10	68	54	61	**3rd**	**Quarter-finals**	**Runners-up**	Conference League	QR2	(Israel) Dia Saba	16
2025-26	Ligat HaAl	36	15	10	11	66	47	55	**5th**	**Semi-finals**	**8th**	Conference League	QR3	(Israel) Guy Melamed	18
Total		2,313	1,122	581	587	3,647	2,417	3,525							

== Key ==
- P = Played
- W = Games won
- D = Games drawn
- L = Games lost
- F = Goals for
- A = Goals against
- Pts = Points
- Pos = Final position
- R32 = Round 1
- R16 = Round 2
- QF = Quarter-finals
- SF = Semi-finals
- UCL = UEFA Champions League
- UEL = UEFA Europa League
- UCP = UEFA Cup
- ECW = UEFA Cup Winners' Cup
- INT = UEFA Intertoto Cup
- Group = Group stage
- QR1 = First Qualifying Round
- QR2 = Second Qualifying Round
- QR3 = Third Qualifying Round
- QR4 = Fourth Qualifying Round

1st Tier
2nd Tier

Champions	Runners-up	Promoted	Relegated
