= 1973–74 Israel State Cup =

Tournament details
- Country: Israel

Final positions
- Champions: Hapoel Haifa (3rd title)
- Runners-up: Hapoel Petah Tikva

The 1973–74 Israel State Cup (Hebrew: גביע המדינה, Gvia HaMedina) was the 35th season of Israel's nationwide football cup competition and the 20th after the Israeli Declaration of Independence.

The competition was won by Hapoel Haifa, who have beaten Hapoel Petah Tikva 1–0 at the final.

== Results ==
=== Third round ===
Home team	Score	Away team
Hapoel Jerusalem	18–1	Maccabi Rosh HaAyin
Beitar Jerusalem	6–1	Hapoel Afeka
Maccabi Jaffa	13–0	Maccabi Lod
Maccabi Herzliya	2–1	Maccabi Pardes Hanna
Maccabi Haifa	5–0	Maccabi Ahi Nazareth
Beitar Holon	0–4	Hapoel Tel Aviv
Hapoel Aliyah Kfar Saba	0–1	Beitar Tel Aviv
Hapoel Givat Haim	0–7	Maccabi Netanya
Hapoel Be'er Sheva	7–0	Beitar Ramat Gan
Hapoel Petah Tikva	6–0	Maccabi HaSharon Netanya
Hakoah Maccabi Ramat Gan	7–0	Maccabi Neve Sha'anan
Hapoel Yehud	2–0	Maccabi Ashkelon
Hapoel Nahliel	3–0	Beitar Nahariya
Hapoel Kiryat Tiv'on	0–12	Maccabi Petah Tikva
Hapoel Or Yehuda	0–7	Maccabi Tel Aviv
Hapoel Hadera	14–0	Maccabi Tamra/Shefa-'Amr
Hapoel Haifa	5–0	Beitar Givat Olga
Hapoel Bnei Zion	1–0	Hapoel Holon
Hapoel Ramat Gan	16–0	Hapoel Shlomi
Hapoel Ashkelon	3–2	Hapoel Ashdod
Hapoel Netanya	3–2	Hapoel Kfar Ruppin
Hapoel Tiberias	3–0	Hapoel Ra'anana
Hapoel Beit She'an	0–7	Hapoel Kfar Saba
Hapoel Kiryat Yam	1–4	Hapoel Acre
Hapoel Tirat HaCarmel	7–0	Hapoel Yokneam
Maccabi Ramat Amidar	8–1	Hapoel Geulim
Bnei Yehuda	6–0	Maccabi Ramla
Hapoel Herzliya	15–0	Maccabi Rameh
Hapoel Makr	0–5	Shimshon Tel Aviv
Beitar Netanya	3–1	Maccabi Tzofei Haifa
Hapoel Be'er Ya'akov	1–1 (a.e.t.) 2–4 p.	Hapoel Kiryat Gat
Beitar Ramla	3–1	Beitar Lod
Hapoel Kadima	0–8	Maccabi Sha'arayim
Hapoel Rosh HaAyin	1–2	Hapoel Beit Shemesh
Hapoel Bat Yam	6–2	Tzeirei Jaffa
Hapoel Dimona	3–0	Hapoel Beit Shikma
Hapoel Rishon LeZion	0–0 (a.e.t.) 5–4 p.	Maccabi Yavne
Hapoel Kiryat Ata	2–0	Hapoel Kiryat Nazareth
SK Nes Tziona	8–0	Hapoel Bnei Lod
Hapoel Azor	3–3 (a.e.t.) 4–3 p.	Maccabi Be'er Sheva
Hapoel Bnei Ayish	1–7	Hapoel Mahane Yehuda
Hapoel Marmorek	16–1	Hapoel HaMuslemi Jaffa
Maccabi Beit She'an	4–2	Hapoel Neot Mordechai
Beitar Mahane Yehuda	0–1	Hapoel Holon
Hapoel Ramla	4–2 (a.e.t.)	Hapoel Hod HaSharon
Beitar Tel Hanan	3–1	Hapoel Zikhron Ya'akov
Hapoel Tel Hanan	2–1	Beitar Kiryat Shmona
Maccabi Kafr Qasim	3–1 (a.e.t.)	Hapoel Batzra
Hapoel Lod	6–0	Hapoel Kfar Yona
Hapoel Nahariya	5–0	Hapoel Ahva Haifa
Hapoel Afula	9–1	Hapoel Kabul
Lazarus Holon	5–2	Hapoel Matzliah
Hapoel HaShalom Ramla	3–1	Maccabi Kiryat Gat
Maccabi Ramat Hen	0–0 (a.e.t.) 4–5 p.	Hapoel Mefalsim
Hapoel Kiryat Ono	3–1	Beitar Jaffa
Hapoel HaTzair Haifa	w/o	Hapoel Migdal HaEmek
Beitar Hatzor	2–0	Hapoel Arraba
Hapoel Namal Ashdod	1–3	Maccabi Holon
Hapoel Safed	5–3 (a.e.t.)	Maccabi Hadera
Hapoel Fureidis	3–4	Hapoel Caesarea
Beitar Tiberias	4–2	Hapoel HaHotrim
Hapoel Bnei Mazra'a	0–19	Hapoel Bnei Nazareth
Hapoel Bnei Acre	2–1	Hapoel Afikim
Hapoel Kiryat Shmona	4–2	Hapoel Ein Harod

=== Fourth round ===
Home team	Score	Away team
Bnei Yehuda	0–1	Hapoel Bat Yam
Hapoel Kfar Saba	12–0	Beitar Tel Hanan
Hapoel HaShalom Ramla	5–2	Hapoel Mefalsim
Beitar Tel Aviv	4–1	Hapoel Nahariya
Hapoel Tel Aviv	8–1	Hapoel Tel Hanan
Maccabi Tel Aviv	2–0	Hapoel Ramla
Hakoah Maccabi Ramat Gan	3–2	Hapoel Mahane Yehuda
Hapoel Rishon LeZion	0–1	Maccabi Petah Tikva
Hapoel Marmorek	0–3	Hapoel Petah Tikva
Maccabi Jaffa	1–0 (a.e.t.)	Hapoel Herzliya
Maccabi Netanya	7–0	Hapoel Kiryat Ono
Hapoel Jerusalem	1–0	Hapoel Kiryat Shmona
Beitar Ramla	2–1 (a.e.t.)	Maccabi Holon
Maccabi Ramat Amidar	2–0	Hapoel Dimona
Beitar Tiberias	0–1	Hapoel Netanya
Hapoel Afula	1–1 (a.e.t.) 3–4 p.	Hapoel Ramat Gan
Hapoel Hadera	3–1	Hapoel Yehud
Beitar Jerusalem	4–0	Hapoel Safed
Hapoel Azor	0–7	Maccabi Haifa
Hapoel Bnei Nazareth	3–1	Hapoel Ashkelon
Hapoel Be'er Sheva	3–1 (a.e.t.)	Maccabi Sha'arayim
Hapoel Haifa	11–0	Maccabi Beit She'an
Hapoel Lod	1–0	Hapoel Caesarea
Hapoel Nahliel	2–1	Hapoel Tiberias
Lazarus Holon	4–2	Hapoel Kiryat Gat
Hapoel Bnei Zion	0–2 (a.e.t.)	Hapoel Beit Shemesh
Hapoel Kiryat Ata	2–0	Hapoel Migdal HaEmek
Hapoel Tirat HaCarmel	4–2	Shimshon Tel Aviv
Maccabi Kafr Qasim	0–6	Maccabi Herzliya
Beitar Hatzor	1–0	Hapoel Bnei Acre
Hapoel Acre	3–1	Beitar Netanya
SK Nes Tziona	1–1 (a.e.t.) 2–4 p.	Hapoel Holon

=== Fifth round ===
Team 1	Agg.	Team 2	1st leg	2nd leg
Hapoel Ramat Gan	4–1	Maccabi Jaffa	2–0	2–1
Beitar Tel Aviv	7–1	Hapoel Netanya	1–0	6–1
Hakoah Maccabi Ramat Gan	3–2	Hapoel Kiryat Ata	2–1	1–1
Lazarus Holon	1–20	Hapoel Petah Tikva	0–5	1–15
Hapoel Holon	3–2	Beitar Hatzor	1–0	2–2 (a.e.t.)
Hapoel Haifa	4–2	Hapoel Bat Yam	2–2	2–0
Maccabi Petah Tikva	3–2	Maccabi Haifa	1–1	2–1
Hapoel Acre	1–5	Hapoel Tel Aviv	1–2	0–3
Maccabi Herzliya	3–2	Hapoel Lod	0–1	3–1
Hapoel Be'er Sheva	3–2	Hapoel Hadera	2–2	1–0
Maccabi Netanya	19–0	Hapoel HaShalom Ramla	7–0	12–0
Maccabi Ramat Amidar	3–2	Hapoel Nahliel	2–1	1–1
Hapoel Kfar Saba	13–0	Hapoel Tirat HaCarmel	10–0	3–0
Hapoel Beit Shemesh	3–3; 1–2 p.	Beitar Ramla	2–2	1–1
Hapoel Jerusalem	1–3	Beitar Jerusalem	1–2	0–1
Hapoel Bnei Nazareth	1–8	Maccabi Tel Aviv	1–2	0–6

=== Round of 16 ===
Team 1	Agg.	Team 2	1st leg	2nd leg
Maccabi Netanya	0–2	Beitar Jerusalem	0–0	0–2
Hapoel Petah Tikva	3–2	Beitar Tel Aviv	2–2	1–0
Maccabi Petah Tikva	2–1	Hapoel Ramat Gan	0–0	2–1
Hapoel Kfar Saba	2–3	Hapoel Haifa	0–3	2–0
Hapoel Be'er Sheva	9–2	Maccabi Herzliya	4–1	5–1
Hapoel Holon	1–7	Hakoah Maccabi Ramat Gan	1–4	0–3
Beitar Ramla	1–1; 1–3 p.	Hapoel Tel Aviv	0–1	1–0
Maccabi Ramat Amidar	4–4; 3–4 p.	Maccabi Tel Aviv	2–3	2–1

=== Quarter-finals ===
Team 1	Agg.	Team 2	1st leg	2nd leg
Hakoah Maccabi Ramat Gan	1–2	Beitar Jerusalem	1–1	0–1
Hapoel Petah Tikva	3–1	Hapoel Be'er Sheva	2–0	1–1
Hapoel Haifa	2–1	Hapoel Tel Aviv	0–0	2–1
Maccabi Tel Aviv	6–1	Maccabi Petah Tikva	3–0	3–1

=== Semi-finals ===
Team 1	Agg.	Team 2	1st leg	2nd leg
Beitar Jerusalem	0–3	Hapoel Petah Tikva	0–1	0–2 (w/o)
Maccabi Tel Aviv	0–1	Hapoel Haifa	0–1	0–0

=== Final ===
12 June 1974

Hapoel Petah Tikva	0–1 (a.e.t.)	Hapoel Haifa
		Lifshitz 117'

Bloomfield Stadium, Tel Aviv
Referee: Handwerg
