= 1975–76 Israel State Cup =

Tournament details
- Country: Israel

Final positions
- Champions: Beitar Jerusalem
- Runners-up: Maccabi Tel Aviv

The 1975–76 Israel State Cup (Hebrew: גביע המדינה, Gvia HaMedina) was the 37th season of Israel's nationwide football cup competition and the 22nd after the Israeli Declaration of Independence.

The competition was won by Beitar Jerusalem, who have beaten Maccabi Tel Aviv 2–1 (in extra time) at the final.

== Format Changes ==
After 3 seasons of playing two-legged, home and away, ties, the IFA decided to revert the competition to its old format of one-legged ties.

== Results ==
=== First round ===
Home team	Score	Away team
Hapoel Kiryat Ono	5–2	SK Nes Tziona
Hapoel Tzafririm Holon	1–1 (a.e.t.); 2–3 p.	Maccabi Be'er Sheva
Beitar Jaffa	2–1	Hapoel Giv'atayim
Hapoel Beit Eliezer	1–0	Hapoel Givat Haim
Maccabi Ashkelon	1–0	Beitar Ramat Gan
Beitar Ashkelon	4–0	Hapoel Kafr Qasim
Hapoel Hatzor	1–2	Beitar Dov Netanya
Hapoel Nazareth Illit	3–1	Hapoel Kiryat Tiv'on
Maccabi Ahi Nazareth	6–3	Beitar Tiberias
Maccabi HaSharon Netanya	6–3	Hapoel Kfar Ruppin
Hapoel Or Yehuda	6–3	Hapoel Gedera
Hapoel Beit She'an	2–1	Beitar Nahariya
Beitar Herzliya	2–1	Beitar Holon
Maccabi Ramla	4–2 (a.e.t.)	Hapoel Shikun HaMizrah
Maccabi Yehud	2–4	Hapoel Ofakim
Hapoel Rosh HaAyin	3–0	Beitar Bat Yam
Hapoel Givat Olga	1–0	Hapoel Kafr Qara
Hapoel Kiryat Shmona	1–1 (a.e.t.); 4–1 p.	Hapoel Afikim
Hapoel Majd al-Krum	3–4	Hapoel Afula
Hapoel Safed	3–1	Maccabi Neve Sha'anan
Hapoel Merhavim	w/o	Maccabi Kiryat Gat
Hapoel Kiryat Gat	1–0	Maccabi Yavne
Hapoel Eilat	w/o	Beitar Lod
Beitar Be'er Sheva	w/o	Hapoel Aliyah Kfar Saba
Maccabi Jerusalem	3–1	Hapoel Hod HaSharon
Hapoel Kfar Shalem	1–5	Hapoel Ashkelon
Hapoel Karmiel	1–3	Hapoel Ra'anana
Hapoel Migdal HaEmek	5–1	Hapoel Binyamina
Maccabi Kiryat Bialik	2–0	Hapoel Tayibe
Hapoel Geva HaCarmel		Maccabi Zikhron Ya'akov
Hapoel Kiryat Yam		Beitar Kiryat Shmona
Hapoel HaTzair Haifa		Maccabi Tiberias

=== Second round ===
Home team	Score	Away team
Hapoel Nahliel	0–1	Hapoel Ramat Gan
Beitar Herzliya	3–2	Hapoel Marmorek
Hapoel Beit She'an	5–3 (a.e.t.)	Hapoel Tirat HaCarmel
Hapoel Herzliya	0–2	Hapoel Mahane Yehuda
Beitar Ramla	0–0 (a.e.t.) 2–3 p.	Hapoel Dimona
Beitar Ashkelon	1–0	Hapoel Lod
Hapoel Aliyah Kfar Saba	2–6	Hapoel Yehud
Hapoel Rosh HaAyin	2–1	Hapoel Ashkelon
Hapoel Netanya	4–0	Hapoel HaTzair Haifa
Hapoel Tel Hanan	1–2	Hapoel Acre
Hapoel Nazareth Illit	4–3	Hapoel Migdal HaEmek
Beitar Netanya	1–0	Hapoel Nahariya
Hapoel Geva HaCarmel	3–2	Beitar Dov Netanya
Hapoel Bnei Nazareth	3–1	Hapoel Tiberias
Maccabi Be'er Sheva	1–2	Hapoel Ofakim
Maccabi Ramla	0–2	Hapoel Kiryat Ono
Maccabi HaSharon Netanya	1–0	Hapoel Ra'anana
Hapoel Safed	3–2	Hapoel Kiryat Ata
Hapoel Ramla	w/o	Hapoel Kiryat Gat
Hapoel Kiryat Shmona	2–1	Hapoel Afula
Hapoel Beit Eliezer	2–4 (a.e.t.)	Maccabi Kiryat Bialik
Maccabi Ashkelon	w/o	Hapoel Be'er Ya'akov
Maccabi Jerusalem	2–2 (a.e.t.) 4–5 p.	Maccabi Sha'arayim
Maccabi Ahi Nazareth	1–2	Hapoel Kiryat Yam
Hapoel Eilat	2–0	Hapoel Or Yehuda
Hapoel Holon	1–2	Hapoel Bat Yam
Hapoel Beit Shemesh	3–2	Beitar Jaffa
Maccabi Hadera	0–1 (a.e.t.)	Maccabi Herzliya
Hapoel Ashdod	0–0 (a.e.t.) 0–3 p.	Hapoel Rishon LeZion
Maccabi HaShikma Ramat Gan	2–1	Hapoel Merhavim
Beitar Ashdod	2–4	Maccabi Jaffa
Hapoel Givat Olga	0–1	Maccabi Petah Tikva

=== Third round ===
Home team	Score	Away team
Maccabi Jaffa	1–0 (a.e.t.)	Hapoel Ofakim
Hapoel Bat Yam	2–1	Maccabi Sha'arayim
Beitar Ashkelon	4–0	Maccabi Ashkelon
Hapoel Mahane Yehuda	0–1	Maccabi HaSharon Netanya
Maccabi Petah Tikva	3–1	Beitar Netanya
Hapoel Safed	2–1 (a.e.t.)	Maccabi Herzliya
Hapoel Beit Shemesh	4–0	Hapoel Dimona
Hapoel Kiryat Shmona	3–1	Hapoel Kiryat Yam
Hapoel Netanya	1–1 (a.e.t.) 2–4 p.	Hapoel Nazareth Illit
Hapoel Rishon LeZion	0–1	Hapoel Kiryat Ono
Hapoel Geva HaCarmel	0–6	Hapoel Acre
Maccabi HaShikma Ramat Gan	3–0	Hapoel Kiryat Gat
Hapoel Eilat	1–4	Hapoel Yehud
Hapoel Beit She'an	1–5	Hapoel Ramat Gan
Hapoel Bnei Nazareth	2–0	Maccabi Kiryat Bialik
Hapoel Rosh HaAyin	3–2	Beitar Herzliya

=== Fourth round ===
Home team	Score	Away team
Hapoel Ramat Gan	2–1	Hapoel Tel Aviv
Hapoel Haifa	0–0 (a.e.t.) 4–2 p.	Maccabi Jaffa
Hapoel Jerusalem	2–3	Beitar Tel Aviv
Hapoel Petah Tikva	0–0 (a.e.t.) 3–2 p.	Maccabi Ramat Amidar
Hapoel Hadera	2–3	Maccabi Haifa
Hapoel Yehud	4–2	Maccabi HaSharon Netanya
Hapoel Kiryat Shmona	1–0	Bnei Yehuda
Maccabi Netanya	5–3	Maccabi HaShikma Ramat Gan
Hapoel Bat Yam	0–6	Maccabi Tel Aviv
Beitar Jerusalem	1–1 (a.e.t.) 3–1 p.	Hapoel Safed
Shimshon Tel Aviv	1–0	Hapoel Beit Shemesh
Hapoel Rosh HaAyin	2–1	Beitar Ashkelon
Hapoel Nazareth Illit	0–8	Hapoel Kfar Saba
Hakoah Maccabi Ramat Gan	2–2 (a.e.t.) 3–0 p.	Hapoel Be'er Sheva
Hapoel Bnei Nazareth	2–1 (a.e.t.)	Hapoel Kiryat Ono
Maccabi Petah Tikva	1–2 (a.e.t.)	Hapoel Acre

=== Round of 16 ===
Home team	Score	Away team
Hapoel Kiryat Shmona	1–1 (a.e.t.) 1–3 p.	Maccabi Tel Aviv
Hapoel Acre	2–4	Beitar Jerusalem
Hapoel Ramat Gan	2–0	Hapoel Yehud
Hapoel Bnei Nazareth	0–5	Hapoel Kfar Saba
Hapoel Petah Tikva	3–1	Maccabi Haifa
Maccabi Netanya	3–1	Beitar Tel Aviv
Hapoel Rosh HaAyin	1–2	Hakoah Maccabi Ramat Gan
Shimshon Tel Aviv	0–0 (a.e.t.) 4–5 p.	Hapoel Haifa

=== Quarter-finals ===
Home team	Score	Away team
Hapoel Kfar Saba	4–1	Hapoel Ramat Gan
Beitar Jerusalem	4–2	Maccabi Netanya
Maccabi Tel Aviv	1–0	Hapoel Haifa
Hapoel Petah Tikva	1–1 (a.e.t.) 4–3 p.	Hakoah Maccabi Ramat Gan

=== Semi-finals ===
Home team	Score	Away team
Maccabi Tel Aviv	3–0	Hapoel Petah Tikva
Beitar Jerusalem	1–0	Hapoel Kfar Saba

=== Final ===
16 June 1976

Maccabi Tel Aviv	1–2 (a.e.t.)	Beitar Jerusalem
Peretz 44'		Neuman 41'; Malmilian 114'

Ramat Gan Stadium
Attendance: 55000
Referee: Finkelstein
