= 1981–82 Israel State Cup =

Tournament details
- Country: Israel

Final positions
- Champions: Hapoel Yehud
- Runners-up: Hapoel Tel Aviv

The 1981–82 Israel State Cup (Hebrew: גביע המדינה, Gvia HaMedina) was the 43rd season of Israel's nationwide football cup competition and the 28th after the Israeli Declaration of Independence.

The competition was won by Hapoel Yehud who have beaten Hapoel Tel Aviv 1–0 in the final.

== Results ==
=== Fifth Round ===
| Home team | Score | Away team |
|---|---|---|
| Hapoel Afikim | w/o | Beitar Be'er Sheva |
| Hapoel Ganei Tikva | w/o | Hapoel Ahva Haifa |
| Hapoel Azor | 2–0 | Hapoel Dimona |
| Hapoel Nahariya | 0–2 | Hapoel Herzliya |
| Maccabi Neve Sha'anan | 3–1 | Hapoel Ra'anana |
| Hapoel Holon | 2–0 | Maccabi Hadera |
| Ironi Ashdod | 3–0 | Hapoel Kafr Sulam |
| Hapoel Marmorek | 1–0 | Hapoel Yafa |
| Hapoel Ramat HaSharon | 2–3 | Hapoel Tzafririm Holon |
| Beitar Haifa | 1–2 | Hapoel Or Yehuda |
| Hapoel Tirat HaCarmel | 4–1 | Hapoel Mevaseret Zion |
| Maccabi Ashkelon | 1–3 | Hapoel Kiryat Ata |
| Hapoel Ashkelon | 3–2 | Maccabi Herzliya |
| Hapoel Hadera | 3–0 | Hapoel HaTzair Kiryat Haim |
| Hapoel Emek Hefer | 1–4 | Hapoel Bat Yam |
| Maccabi Lazarus Holon | 1–1 (a.e.t.) 2–3 p. | Maccabi Sha'arayim |

=== Sixth Round ===
| Home team | Score | Away team |
|---|---|---|
| Hapoel Haifa | 2–0 | Hapoel Acre |
| Hapoel Ashkelon | 1–0 | Hapoel Tel Hanan |
| Hapoel Tzafririm Holon | 1–1, replay: 1–2 | Hapoel Ramat Gan |
| Hapoel Marmorek | 1–2 | Hapoel Lod |
| Hapoel Or Yehuda | 1–0 | Hapoel Azor |
| Hapoel Hadera | 2–2, replay: 0–3 | Beitar Ramla |
| Hapoel Holon | 1–0 | Maccabi Neve Sha'anan |
| Hapoel Kiryat Ata | 1–0 | Beitar Netanya |
| Ironi Ashdod | 1–0 (a.e.t.) | Hapoel Herzliya |
| Hapoel Bat Yam | 1–0 (a.e.t.) | Maccabi Ramat Amidar |
| Maccabi Kiryat Gat | 2–3 | Hapoel Nazareth Illit |
| Maccabi Yavne | 1–1, replay: 0–1 | Hakoah Maccabi Ramat Gan |
| Maccabi Sha'arayim | 2–3 | Hapoel Beit She'an |
| Hapoel Kiryat Shmona | 1–0 | Hapoel Afikim |
| Hapoel Beit Shemesh | 6–0 | Hapoel Tirat HaCarmel |
| Hapoel Ahva Haifa | 0–1 | Hapoel Tiberias |

=== Seventh Round ===
| Home team | Score | Away team |
|---|---|---|
| Hapoel Bat Yam | 2–0 | Hapoel Petah Tikva |
| Bnei Yehuda | 0–0, replay: 0–2 | Hapoel Lod |
| Maccabi Netanya | 4–1 | Hapoel Kiryat Ata |
| Hapoel Holon | 1–1, replay: 0–2 | Maccabi Haifa |
| Hapoel Beit Shemesh | 0–1 | Hapoel Tel Aviv |
| Maccabi Petah Tikva | 2–0 | Hapoel Beit She'an |
| Beitar Tel Aviv | 1–0 | Hapoel Kiryat Shmona |
| Shimshon Tel Aviv | 5–1 | Hapoel Tiberias |
| Hapoel Yehud | 2–1 | Beitar Ramla |
| Ironi Ashdod | 0–1 | Maccabi Tel Aviv |
| Hapoel Ashkelon | 0–2 | Maccabi Jaffa |
| Hapoel Haifa | 1–1, replay: 0–1 | Hapoel Be'er Sheva |
| Hapoel Nazareth Illit | 0–0, replay: 1–2 | Hapoel Rishon LeZion |
| Hakoah Maccabi Ramat Gan | 2–1 (a.e.t.) | Hapoel Jerusalem |
| Beitar Jerusalem | 1–0 | Hapoel Or Yehuda |
| Hapoel Kfar Saba | 0–1 (a.e.t.) | Hapoel Ramat Gan |

=== Round of 16 ===
| Home team | Score | Away team |
|---|---|---|
| Beitar Tel Aviv | 0–2 | Hapoel Tel Aviv |
| Hapoel Rishon LeZion | 1–0 | Shimshon Tel Aviv |
| Hakoah Maccabi Ramat Gan | w/o | Hapoel Ramat Gan |
| Hapoel Be'er Sheva | 0–0, replay: 1–0 | Maccabi Netanya |
| Maccabi Tel Aviv | 0–0, replay: 0–2 | Hapoel Yehud |
| Maccabi Jaffa | 2–2, replay: 0–1 | Beitar Jerusalem |
| Hapoel Lod | 2–2, replay: 2–4 | Maccabi Haifa |
| Maccabi Petah Tikva | 3–0 | Hapoel Bat Yam |

=== Quarter-finals ===
| Home team | Score | Away team |
|---|---|---|
| Maccabi Haifa | 0–0, replay: 0–1 | Hapoel Yehud |
| Hapoel Be'er Sheva | 4–0 | Hakoah Maccabi Ramat Gan |
| Maccabi Petah Tikva | 1–3 | Hapoel Tel Aviv |
| Beitar Jerusalem | 1–0 | Hapoel Rishon LeZion |

=== Semi-finals ===
| Home team | Score | Away team |
|---|---|---|
| Hapoel Tel Aviv | 2–2 (a.e.t.) 5–3 p. | Hapoel Be'er Sheva |
| Hapoel Yehud | 1–0 | Beitar Jerusalem |

=== Final ===
19 May 1982

| Hapoel Tel Aviv | 0–1 | Hapoel Yehud |
|---|---|---|
| | | Rokvan 55' |

Ramat Gan Stadium
Attendance: 15000
Referee: Ashkenazi
