= 1976–77 Liga Alef =

Israeli football season

The 1976–77 Liga Alef season was the first in which Liga Alef was the third tier of Israeli football due to the formation of Liga Artzit.

Hapoel Tirat HaCarmel (champions of the North Division) and Hapoel Beit Shemesh (champions of the South Division) won the title and promotion to Liga Artzit.

== North Division ==
Pos	Team	Pld	W	D	L	GF	GA	GD	Pts	Promotion or relegation
1	Hapoel Tirat HaCarmel	26	15	9	2	46	19	+27	39	Promoted to Liga Artzit
2	Hapoel Kiryat Shmona	26	13	6	7	32	32	0	32	
3	Hapoel Herzliya	26	11	6	9	41	32	+9	28	
4	Hapoel Beit She'an	26	8	12	6	32	31	+1	28	
5	Maccabi Herzliya	26	9	9	8	36	29	+7	27	
6	Hapoel Afikim	26	10	6	10	35	32	+3	26	
7	Hapoel Tel Hanan	26	9	8	9	27	26	+1	26	
8	Hapoel Bnei Nazareth	26	9	8	9	39	39	0	26	
9	Hapoel Nahariya	26	9	7	10	30	30	0	25	
10	Hapoel Ra'anana	26	9	6	11	34	42	−8	24	
11	Hapoel Nazareth Illit	26	9	6	11	27	31	−4	22 (Note: 2 points deducted.)	
12	Hapoel Nahliel	26	8	5	13	29	36	−7	21	
13	Hapoel Mahane Yehuda	26	7	8	11	30	38	−8	20	Relegated to Liga Bet
14	Hapoel Safed	26	4	8	14	25	46	−21	16	Relegated to Liga Bet

== South Division ==
Pos	Team	Pld	W	D	L	GF	GA	GD	Pts	Promotion or relegation
1	Hapoel Beit Shemesh	26	16	6	4	40	17	+23	38	Promoted to Liga Artzit
2	Maccabi Yavne	29	13	5	11	31	22	+9	31	
3	Hapoel Bat Yam	26	11	7	8	36	30	+6	29	
4	SK Nes Tziona	26	13	3	10	28	28	0	29	
5	Hapoel Marmorek	26	12	4	10	36	30	+6	28	
6	Hapoel Ashkelon	26	6	15	5	22	19	+3	27	
7	Beitar Ramla	26	9	8	9	33	29	+4	26	
8	Beitar Ekron Ashdod	26	9	8	9	32	30	+2	26	
9	Hapoel Ramla	26	9	8	9	29	33	−4	26	
10	Maccabi Ramat HaShikma	26	6	12	8	27	32	−5	24	
11	Hapoel Or Yehuda	26	6	11	9	22	31	−9	23	
12	Hapoel Rosh HaAyin	26	8	8	10	41	40	+1	22 (Note: 2 points deducted.)	
13	Hapoel Dimona	26	5	11	10	29	29	0	21	Relegated to Liga Bet
14	Hapoel Be'er Ya'akov	26	4	4	18	26	63	−37	12	Relegated to Liga Bet
