= 1983–84 Liga Bet =

Israeli football season

The 1983–84 Liga Bet season saw Maccabi Tamra, Maccabi Or Akiva, Maccabi HaShikma Ramat Gan and Hapoel Dimona win their regional divisions and promoted to Liga Alef.

At the bottom, Hapoel Ein Mahil, Hapoel Safed (from North A division), Hapoel HaTzair Kiryat Haim (from North B division), Hapoel Rosh HaAyin, Hapoel Tel Mond (from South A division), Maccabi Be'er Sheva and Maccabi Ashkelon (from South B division) were all automatically relegated to Liga Gimel, whilst Hapoel Afula (from North B division) folded during the season.

== North Division A ==
Pos	Team	Pld	W	D	L	GF	GA	GD	Pts	Promotion or relegation
1	Maccabi Tamra	26	–	–	–	71	25	+46	43	Promoted to Liga Alef
2	Maccabi Acre	26	–	–	–	66	30	+36	43	
3	Beitar Nahariya	26	–	–	–	50	25	+25	35	
4	Hapoel Bnei Tamra	26	–	–	–	50	33	+17	34	
5	Hapoel Afikim	25	–	–	–	59	51	+8	28	
6	Hapoel Nahariya	26	–	–	–	46	38	+8	28	
7	Maccabi Kiryat Bialik	25	–	–	–	40	33	+7	24	
8	Hapoel Iksal	26	–	–	–	28	43	−15	21	
9	Hapoel Makr	26	–	–	–	45	52	−7	19	
10	Hapoel Bnei Acre	26	–	–	–	24	39	−15	19	
11	Hapoel Kafr Sumei	26	–	–	–	32	53	−21	19	
12	Hapoel Majd al-Krum	25	–	–	–	23	40	−17	17	
13	Hapoel Ein Mahil (Note: Hapoel Ein Mahil was suspended for three years by the Israel Football Association, after the club was found guilty of vicarious liability, when one of their players attempted to bribe Hapoel Nahariya's goalkeeper, prior to the match between the two clubs which ended 1-0 to Hapoel Ein Mahil.)	26	–	–	–	25	50	−25	16	Relegated to Liga Gimel
14	Hapoel Safed	25	–	–	–	21	69	−48	8	Relegated to Liga Gimel

== North Division B ==
Pos	Team	Pld	W	D	L	GF	GA	GD	Pts	Promotion or relegation
1	Maccabi Or Akiva	24	–	–	–	50	23	+27	35	Promoted to Liga Alef
2	Hapoel Givat Olga	24	–	–	–	45	22	+23	33	
3	Hapoel Aliyah Kfar Saba	24	–	–	–	47	29	+18	33	
4	Hapoel Baqa al-Gharbiyye	24	–	–	–	41	31	+10	28	
5	Hapoel Kafr Qara	24	–	–	–	27	31	−4	24	
6	Hapoel Nahliel	24	–	–	–	31	36	−5	22	
7	Hapoel Beit Eliezer	24	–	–	–	29	32	−3	21	
8	Hapoel Kafr Sulam	24	–	–	–	35	39	−4	21	
9	Hapoel Daliyat al-Karmel	24	–	–	–	29	35	−6	21	
10	Hapoel Tayibe	24	–	–	–	36	41	−5	19	
11	Hapoel Umm al-Fahm	24	–	–	–	22	41	−19	19	
12	Hapoel HaTzair Kiryat Haim (Note: Hapoel HaTzair Kiryat Haim withdrew from the league at the end of the season. as a result, Hapoel Emek Hefer were reprieved from relegation.)	24	–	–	–	25	38	−13	18	Relegated to Liga Gimel
13	Hapoel Emek Hefer	24	–	–	–	32	49	−17	17	

Notes:

Hapoel Afula folded during the season.

== South Division A ==
Pos	Team	Pld	W	D	L	GF	GA	GD	Pts	Promotion or relegation
1	Maccabi HaShikma Ramat Gan	26	–	–	–	68	18	+50	40	Promoted to Liga Alef
2	Hapoel Jaljulia	26	–	–	–	77	32	+45	39	
3	Hapoel Or Yehuda	26	–	–	–	63	25	+38	39	
4	Hapoel Kafr Qasim	26	–	–	–	39	28	+11	32	
5	Hapoel Herzliya	26	–	–	–	49	26	+23	31	
6	Hapoel Kfar Shalem	26	–	–	–	34	30	+4	28	
7	Beitar Kfar Saba	26	–	–	–	31	41	−10	26	
8	Hapoel Tira	26	–	–	–	30	41	−11	25	
9	Maccabi Shikun HaMizrah	26	–	–	–	35	38	−3	22	
10	Hapoel Mahane Yehuda	26	–	–	–	37	47	−10	22	
11	Beitar Katamonim	26	–	–	–	44	58	−14	20	
12	Hapoel Neve Golan	26	–	–	–	32	46	−14	20	
13	Hapoel Rosh HaAyin	26	–	–	–	24	68	−44	11	Relegated to Liga Gimel
14	Hapoel Tel Mond	26	–	–	–	20	67	−47	8	Relegated to Liga Gimel

== South Division B ==
Pos	Team	Pld	W	D	L	GF	GA	GD	Pts	Promotion or relegation
1	Hapoel Dimona	26	–	–	–	58	22	+36	43	Promoted to Liga Alef
2	Hapoel Sderot	26	–	–	–	35	28	+7	30	
3	Hapoel Kiryat Malakhi	26	–	–	–	36	31	+5	27	
4	Hapoel Be'er Ya'akov	26	–	–	–	29	34	−5	26	
5	Hapoel Ashdod	26	–	–	–	31	39	−8	26	
6	Hapoel Merhavim	26	–	–	–	39	35	+4	25	
7	Maccabi Kiryat Ekron	26	–	–	–	30	32	−2	25	
8	Beitar Lod	26	–	–	–	33	42	−9	25	
9	Beitar Kiryat Gat	26	–	–	–	32	45	−13	24	
10	Maccabi Rehovot	26	–	–	–	29	34	−5	22	
11	Beitar Kiryat Malakhi	26	–	–	–	29	44	−15	22	
12	SK Nes Tziona	26	–	–	–	40	33	+7	21	
13	Maccabi Be'er Sheva	26	–	–	–	35	32	+3	21	Relegated to Liga Gimel
14	Maccabi Ashkelon	26	–	–	–	29	35	−6	19	Relegated to Liga Gimel
