= 1971–72 Israel State Cup =

Tournament details
- Country: Israel

Final positions
- Champions: Hapoel Tel Aviv (7th title)
- Runners-up: Hapoel Jerusalem

The 1971–72 Israel State Cup (Hebrew: גביע המדינה, Gvia HaMedina) was the 33rd season of Israel's nationwide football cup competition and the 18th after the Israeli Declaration of Independence.

The competition was won by Hapoel Tel Aviv, who have beaten Hapoel Jerusalem 1–0 at the final.

== Results ==
=== Fourth round ===
Home team	Score	Away team
Hapoel Bnei Nazareth	1–3	Hapoel Ramat Gan
Hapoel Afikim	2–2 (a.e.t.) 0–5 p.	Beitar Acre
Beitar Be'er Sheva	3–1	Hapoel Eilat
Hapoel Beit She'an	0–3	Hapoel Tirat HaCarmel
Hapoel Rishon LeZion	1–1 (a.e.t.) 5–4 p.	Hapoel Rosh HaAyin
Hapoel Acre	3–1	Hapoel Netanya
Hapoel Be'er Ya'akov	5–2	Maccabi Ramat Hen
Hapoel Caesarea	0–5	Hapoel Nahliel
Hapoel Karmiel	3–8	Hapoel Kiryat Ata
Hapoel Tiberias	2–1	Beitar Kiryat Shmona
Hapoel Bat Yam	1–0	ASA Jerusalem
Hapoel Kiryat Nazareth	1–4	Hapoel Nahariya
M.S. Even Yehuda	1–4	Maccabi Petah Tikva
Beitar Ramla	3–2	Hapoel Kiryat Ono
Beitar Lod	0–0 (a.e.t.) 3–2 p.	Beitar Bat Yam
Hapoel Mahane Yehuda	5–1	Hapoel Bnei Tamra
Beitar Katamonim	1–2 (a.e.t.)	Hapoel Merhavim
Hapoel Yehud	w/o	Hapoel Ashkelon
Maccabi Zikhron Ya'akov	w/o	Hapoel Kiryat Haim
SK Nes Tziona	5–0	Hapoel Kafr Qasim
Hapoel Zikhron Ya'akov	5–1	Beitar Nahariya
Hapoel Beit Shemesh	2–1	Hapoel Dimona
Beitar Herzliya	3–2	Maccabi Sha'arayim
Hapoel Migdal HaEmek	7–1	Hapoel Kiryat Yam
Hapoel Holon	3–1	Hapoel Ashdod
Maccabi Yavne	0–0 (a.e.t.) 5–6 p.	Maccabi Ramat Amidar
Maccabi Herzliya	w/o	Hapoel Kiryat Shmona
Maccabi Ramla	1–5	Hapoel Marmorek
Beitar Dov Netanya	1–3	Beitar Netanya
Hapoel Herzliya	0–1	Hapoel Givat Haim
Maccabi HaShikma Ramat Gan	3–0	Hapoel Jaljulia
Maccabi Bat Yam	1–1 (a.e.t.) 2–4 p.	Hapoel Lod

=== Fifth round ===
Home team	Score	Away team
Hapoel Holon	1–1 (a.e.t.) 3–4 p.	Hapoel Tirat HaCarmel
Maccabi Ramat Amidar	2–0	Beitar Be'er Sheva
Hapoel Kiryat Ata	3–0	Hapoel Be'er Ya'akov
Hapoel Ramat Gan	5–1	Hapoel Tiberias
Hapoel Mahane Yehuda	2–2 (a.e.t.) 4–3 p.	Beitar Ramla
Maccabi Zikhron Ya'akov	3–0	Maccabi HaShikma Ramat Gan
Beitar Herzliya	1–5	Beitar Netanya
Hapoel Yehud	2–1	Hapoel Bat Yam
Hapoel Nahariya	2–1	Hapoel Givat Haim
Hapoel Acre	1–2 (a.e.t.)	Maccabi Petah Tikva
Hapoel Marmorek	2–1	SK Nes Tziona
Hapoel Migdal HaEmek	1–0	Hapoel Merhavim
Hapoel Lod	3–1	Maccabi Herzliya
Beitar Acre	4–1	Hapoel Zikhron Ya'akov
Hapoel Rishon LeZion	2–0	Hapoel Nahliel
Beitar Lod	1–2	Hapoel Beit Shemesh

=== Sixth Round ===
Home team	Score	Away team
Hapoel Migdal HaEmek	5–2	Hapoel Kfar Saba
Hapoel Petah Tikva	1–2	Maccabi Tel Aviv
Hapoel Tel Aviv	4–0	Maccabi Ramat Amidar
Hapoel Ramat Gan	1–2	Hapoel Marmorek
Hapoel Nahariya	3–2	Maccabi Zikhron Ya'akov
Maccabi Jaffa	0–0 (a.e.t.) 3–2 p.	Hakoah Maccabi Ramat Gan
Maccabi Netanya	2–0 (a.e.t.)	Hapoel Mahane Yehuda
Hapoel Hadera	3–3 (a.e.t.) 2–3 p.	Maccabi Haifa
Beitar Netanya	1–3	Maccabi Petah Tikva
Beitar Tel Aviv	6–2	Hapoel Rishon LeZion
Hapoel Kiryat Ata	2–0	Beitar Acre
Shimshon Tel Aviv	0–1; Abandoned	Hapoel Haifa
Hapoel Beit Shemesh	0–4	Hapoel Jerusalem
Beitar Jerusalem	2–0	Hapoel Tirat HaCarmel
Hapoel Be'er Sheva	1–0	Bnei Yehuda
Hapoel Yehud	2–3	Hapoel Lod

=== Round of 16 ===
Home team	Score	Away team
Maccabi Petah Tikva	3–2	Hapoel Migdal HaEmek
Hapoel Marmorek	1–2	Maccabi Netanya
Maccabi Tel Aviv	1–0	Hapoel Be'er Sheva
Hapoel Nahariya	0–1	Beitar Jerusalem
Hapoel Lod	1–2	Hapoel Jerusalem
Hapoel Tel Aviv	3–2 (a.e.t.)	Maccabi Jaffa
Maccabi Haifa	1–0	Beitar Tel Aviv
Hapoel Haifa	4–0	Hapoel Kiryat Ata

=== Quarter-finals ===
Home team	Score	Away team
Maccabi Haifa	3–1	Hapoel Haifa
Hapoel Jerusalem	1–0	Maccabi Petah Tikva
Maccabi Netanya	0–3	Maccabi Tel Aviv
Beitar Jerusalem	1–2 (a.e.t.)	Hapoel Tel Aviv

=== Semi-finals ===
Home team	Score	Away team
Hapoel Jerusalem	0–0 (a.e.t.); 7–6 p.	Maccabi Tel Aviv
Hapoel Tel Aviv	2–1	Maccabi Haifa

=== Final ===
26 September 1972

Hapoel Tel Aviv	1–0	Hapoel Jerusalem
Feigenbaum 41'

Bloomfield Stadium, Tel Aviv
Attendance: 20000
Referee: Klein
