= 1986–87 Toto Cup Artzit =

Toto Cup Artzit
- Season: 1986–87
- Champions: Hapoel Haifa

The 1986–87 Toto Cup Artzit was the 3rd season of the second tier League Cup (as a separate competition) since its introduction.

It was held in two stages. First, the 16 Liga Artzit teams were divided into four groups. The group winners advanced to the semi-finals, which, as was the final, were held as one-legged matches.

The competition was won by Hapoel Haifa, who had beaten Hapoel Acre 3–2 in the final.

== Group stage ==
=== Group A ===
Pos	Team	Pld	W	D	L	GF	GA	GD	Pts	HAC	HYD	HJE	HHD
1	Hapoel Acre (A)	6	3	3	0	6	1	+5	12	—	4–1	1–0	0–0
2	Hapoel Yehud	6	3	1	2	10	9	+1	10	0–1	—	2–1	4–1
3	Hapoel Jerusalem	6	1	2	3	5	5	0	5	0–0	0–1	—	1–1
4	Hapoel Hadera	6	0	4	2	4	10	−6	4	0–0	2–2	0–3	—

Source: Toto Cup Artzit 1985-86 (in Hebrew)
Rules for classification: 1st points; 2nd goal difference; 3rd matches won; 4th goals scored; 5th head-to-head; 6th decision match
(A) Advanced to semifinal

=== Group B ===
Pos	Team	Pld	W	D	L	GF	GA	GD	Pts	HHA	HTI	BRL	HBN
1	Hapoel Haifa (A)	6	4	2	0	17	5	+12	14	—	3–0	5–2	4–1
2	Hapoel Tiberias	6	3	2	1	4	5	−1	11	0–0	—	0–0	2–1
3	Beitar Ramla	6	1	2	3	7	10	−3	5	2–2	1–1	—	0–1
4	Hapoel Beit She'an	6	1	0	5	4	12	−8	3	0–3	0–1	1–2	—

Source: Toto Cup Artzit 1985-86 (in Hebrew)
Rules for classification: 1st points; 2nd goal difference; 3rd matches won; 4th goals scored; 5th head-to-head; 6th decision match
(A) Advanced to semifinal

=== Group C ===
Pos	Team	Pld	W	D	L	GF	GA	GD	Pts	MSH	MRA	HDM	HRG
1	Maccabi Sha'arayim (A)	6	3	2	1	10	8	+2	11	—	1–0	3–3	3–1
2	Maccabi Ramat Amidar	6	2	3	1	9	6	+3	9	3–1	—	0–0	3–1
3	Hapoel Dimona	6	1	3	2	7	9	−2	6	0–1	1–1	—	1–3
4	Hapoel Ramat Gan	6	1	2	3	9	12	−3	5	1–1	2–2	1–2	—

Source: Toto Cup Artzit 1985-86 (in Hebrew)
Rules for classification: 1st points; 2nd goal difference; 3rd matches won; 4th goals scored; 5th head-to-head; 6th decision match
(A) Advanced to semifinal

=== Group D ===
Pos	Team	Pld	W	D	L	GF	GA	GD	Pts	HTZ	HMR	HMK	BNH
1	Hapoel Tzafririm Holon (A)	6	4	2	0	19	2	+17	14	—	6–0	3–1	7–0
2	Hakoah Amidar Ramat Gan	6	2	3	1	4	8	−4	9	0–0	—	1–0	1–0
3	Hapoel Marmorek	6	1	2	3	6	11	−5	5	1–1	2–2	—	2–1
4	Beitar Nahariya	6	1	1	4	4	12	−8	4	0–2	0–0	3–0	—

Source: Toto Cup Artzit 1985-86 (in Hebrew)
Rules for classification: 1st points; 2nd goal difference; 3rd matches won; 4th goals scored; 5th head-to-head; 6th decision match
(A) Advanced to semifinal

== Elimination rounds ==
=== Semifinals ===
24 January 1987	Hapoel Acre	3–0	Maccabi Sha'arayim	Hadera
14:30	Halfon 45'; Ohayon 65'; Vaknin 75'			Stadium: Hapoel Hadera ground Attendance: 100; Referee: Benny Cohen

24 January 1987	Hapoel Haifa	2–1	Hapoel Tzafririm Holon	Netanya
14:30	Ben Sha'anan 53'; Malka 65'		Penso 86'	Stadium: Beitar Netanya ground Attendance: 40; Referee: Rahamim Dinachi

=== Final ===
3 March 1987

Hapoel Acre	2–3	Hapoel Haifa
Buzurgi 31'; Ohayon 37'		Malka; Amar

Ramat Gan Stadium

== See also ==
- 1986–87 Toto Cup Leumit
