= 2000–01 Toto Cup Artzit =

Toto Cup Artzit
- Season: 2000–01
- Champions: Maccabi Kafr Kanna

The 2000–01 Toto Cup Artzit was the 2nd time the cup was being contested as a competition for the third tier in the Israeli football league system.

The competition was won by Maccabi Kafr Kanna, who had beaten Maccabi Ashkelon 2–0 in the final.

== Format change ==
For this season, the 12 Liga Artzit clubs were divided into three groups with four clubs in each group. The three group winners, together with the best runner-up advanced to the semi-finals.

== Group stage ==
=== Group A ===
Pos	Team	Pld	W	D	L	GF	GA	GD	Pts	HAS	HTY	HBY	BST
1	Hapoel Ashkelon (A)	6	3	3	0	11	4	+7	12	—	1–1	0–0	3–0
2	Hapoel Tayibe	6	2	3	1	12	10	+2	9	1–3	—	2–2	3–1
3	Hapoel Bat Yam	6	1	4	1	8	9	−1	7	1–3	2–2	—	1–1
4	Beitar Shimshon Tel Aviv	6	0	2	4	5	13	−8	2	1–1	1–3	1–2	—

Source: RSSSF (in Hebrew)
Rules for classification: 1st points; 2nd goal difference; 3rd matches won; 4th goals scored; 5th head-to-head; 6th decision match
(A) Advanced to the Semifinals

=== Group B ===
Pos	Team	Pld	W	D	L	GF	GA	GD	Pts	HRA	MKK	HRH	HMJ
1	Hapoel Ra'anana (A)	6	4	2	0	6	1	+5	14	—	1–1	2–0	1–0
2	Maccabi Kafr Kanna (A)	6	3	1	2	9	4	+5	10	0–1	—	4–0	1–0
3	Hapoel Ramat HaSharon	6	1	2	3	3	10	−7	5	0–0	1–0	—	1–1
4	Ihud Bnei Majd al-Krum	6	1	1	4	5	8	−3	4	0–1	1–3	3–1	—

Source: RSSSF (in Hebrew)
Rules for classification: 1st points; 2nd goal difference; 3rd matches won; 4th goals scored; 5th head-to-head; 6th decision match
(A) Advanced to the Semifinals

=== Group C ===
Pos	Team	Pld	W	D	L	GF	GA	GD	Pts	MAS	MSH	HAC	HNI
1	Maccabi Ashkelon (A)	6	4	2	0	10	4	+6	14	—	1–1	2–0	1–1
2	Maccabi Sha'arayim	6	1	4	1	7	6	+1	7	1–3	—	3–0	1–1
3	Hapoel Acre	6	2	1	3	2	6	−4	7	0–1	0–0	—	1–0
4	Hapoel Nazareth Illit	6	0	3	3	4	7	−3	3	1–2	1–1	0–1	—

Source: RSSSF (in Hebrew)
Rules for classification: 1st points; 2nd goal difference; 3rd matches won; 4th goals scored; 5th head-to-head; 6th decision match
(A) Advanced to the Semifinals

== Semifinals ==
Home team	Score	Away team
Hapoel Ashkelon	3–3 (a.e.t.) (4–5 p)	Maccabi Ashkelon
Hapoel Ra'anana	1–4	Maccabi Kafr Kanna

== Final ==
7 November 2000

Maccabi Ashkelon	0–2	Maccabi Kafr Kanna
		Abbas 46'; El-Al 80'

Bat Yam Municipal Stadium

== See also ==
- Toto Cup
- 2000–01 Liga Artzit
