= 1984–85 Liga Artzit =

1984–85 Liga Artzit season
- League: Liga Artzit
- Sport: Soccer
- Number of teams: 16

Regular season
- Title champions: Bnei Yehuda
- Runners-up: Maccabi Sha'arayim
- Promoted to Liga Leumit: Bnei Yehuda; Maccabi Sha'arayim; Hapoel Jerusalem
- Relegated to Liga Alef: Hapoel Ashkelon; Hapoel Rishon LeZion; Hapoel Kiryat Shmona

Seasons
- ← 1983–84 1985–86 →

The 1984–85 Liga Artzit season saw Bnei Yehuda win the title and promotion to Liga Leumit. Maccabi Sha'arayim and Hapoel Jerusalem were also promoted.

Hapoel Ashkelon, Hapoel Rishon LeZion and Hapoel Kiryat Shmona were all relegated to Liga Alef.

== Final table ==
Pos	Team	Pld	W	D	L	GF	GA	GD	Pts	Promotion or relegation
1	Bnei Yehuda	30	18	6	6	48	23	+25	60	Promoted to Liga Leumit
2	Maccabi Sha'arayim	30	17	8	5	49	26	+23	59	Promoted to Liga Leumit
3	Hapoel Jerusalem	30	15	9	6	39	11	+28	54	Promoted to Liga Leumit
4	Hapoel Ramat HaSharon	30	14	9	7	36	20	+16	51	
5	Hapoel Hadera	30	13	9	8	44	32	+12	48	
6	Hapoel Holon	30	10	13	7	42	34	+8	43	
7	Maccabi Ramat Amidar	30	9	11	10	36	35	+1	38	
8	Hapoel Yehud	30	9	11	10	35	34	+1	38	
9	Hapoel Marmorek	30	10	8	12	38	45	−7	38	
10	Hapoel Tiberias	30	9	9	12	41	39	+2	36	
11	Hapoel Ramat Gan	30	9	8	13	32	45	−13	35	
12	Beitar Ramla	30	8	10	12	25	40	−15	34	
13	Beitar Haifa	30	8	9	13	26	38	−12	33	
14	Hapoel Ashkelon	30	6	14	10	30	34	−4	32	Relegated to Liga Alef
15	Hapoel Rishon LeZion	30	6	12	12	27	39	−12	30	Relegated to Liga Alef
16	Hapoel Kiryat Shmona	30	2	8	20	15	68	−53	14	Relegated to Liga Alef
