= 1984–85 Liga Alef =

Israeli football season

The 1984–85 Liga Alef season saw Beitar Netanya (champions of the North Division) and Hapoel Beit Shemesh (champions of the South Division) win the title and promotion to Liga Artzit. Hapoel Acre also promoted after promotion play-offs.

== North Division ==
Pos	Team	Pld	W	D	L	GF	GA	GD	Pts	Promotion or relegation
1	Beitar Netanya	26	18	7	1	67	12	+55	43	Promoted to Liga Artzit
2	Hapoel Acre	26	17	6	3	62	23	+39	40	Promotion play-offs
3	Maccabi Hadera	26	16	7	3	63	13	+50	39	
4	Hapoel Beit She'an	26	14	4	8	40	22	+18	32	
5	Maccabi Shefa-'Amr	26	12	7	7	42	24	+18	31	
6	Maccabi Tamra	26	11	4	11	50	48	+2	26	
7	Maccabi Ahi Nazareth	26	10	6	10	34	38	−4	26	
8	Hapoel Kiryat Ata	26	10	5	11	36	43	−7	25	
9	Maccabi Or Akiva	26	5	12	9	32	36	−4	22	
10	Hapoel Nazareth Illit	26	6	9	11	29	33	−4	21	
11	Hapoel Tirat HaCarmel	26	9	3	14	50	57	−7	21	
12	Maccabi Afula	26	7	6	13	31	45	−14	20	
13	Hapoel Bnei Nazareth	26	4	2	20	28	77	−49	10	Relegated to Liga Bet
14	Hapoel Tel Hanan	26	3	2	21	17	110	−93	8	Relegated to Liga Bet

== South Division ==
Pos	Team	Pld	W	D	L	GF	GA	GD	Pts	Promotion or relegation
1	Hapoel Beit Shemesh	26	12	10	4	40	26	+14	34	Promoted to Liga Artzit
2	Maccabi Lazarus Holon	26	10	13	3	36	24	+12	33	Promotion play-offs
3	Maccabi Kiryat Gat	26	12	9	5	28	19	+9	33	
4	Maccabi HaShikma Ramat Gan	26	11	10	5	37	23	+14	32	
5	Hapoel Kiryat Ono	26	11	8	7	29	22	+7	30	
6	Tzafririm Holon	26	8	9	9	26	27	−1	25	
7	Hapoel Bat Yam	26	6	11	9	25	27	−2	23	
8	Beitar Be'er Sheva	26	7	9	10	22	25	−3	23	
9	Hapoel Yeruham	26	8	7	11	26	32	−6	23	
10	Hapoel Dimona	26	7	9	10	27	36	−9	23	
11	Hapoel Azor	26	5	12	9	30	32	−2	22	
12	Hapoel Ra'anana	26	6	10	10	17	28	−11	22	
13	Hapoel Ramla	26	6	10	10	23	36	−13	22	Relegated to Liga Bet
14	Hapoel Ihud Tzeirei Jaffa	26	6	7	13	23	32	−9	19	Relegated to Liga Bet

== Promotion play-offs ==
Maccabi Lazarus Holon	2 – 1	Hapoel Acre

Hapoel Acre	2 – 0	Maccabi Lazarus Holon

Hapoel Acre promoted to Liga Artzit.
