= 1975–76 Liga Bet =

Israeli football season

The 1975–76 Liga Bet season was the last in which Liga Bet was the third tier of Israeli football, as at the end of the season, Liga Artzit came into existence, and became the new second tier, Liga Alef became the third tier, and Liga Bet became the fourth tier.

As no club relegated from Liga Alef in the previous season, each Liga Bet division had 15 clubs. due to the restructuring, two clubs promoted from each division; winners, Hapoel Beit She'an, Hapoel Nazareth Illit, Hapoel Or Yehuda and Maccabi Yavne, who joined by second placed clubs, Hapoel Afikim, Hapoel Ra'anana, Hapoel Rosh HaAyin and Hapoel Ashkelon.

== North Division A ==
Pos	Team	Pld	W	D	L	GF	GA	GD	Pts	Promotion or relegation
1	Hapoel Beit She'an	28	–	–	–	69	23	+46	43	Promoted to Liga Alef
2	Hapoel Afikim	28	–	–	–	67	21	+46	40	Promoted to Liga Alef
3	Beitar Nahariya	28	–	–	–	45	44	+1	32	
4	Hapoel Kiryat Yam	27	–	–	–	48	33	+15	31	
5	Hapoel Majd al-Krum	27	–	–	–	37	40	−3	30	
6	Maccabi Ahi Nazareth	28	–	–	–	43	39	+4	29	
7	Maccabi Kiryat Bialik	28	–	–	–	45	43	+2	29	
8	Maccabi Neve Sha'anan	27	–	–	–	33	32	+1	28	
9	Hapoel Hatzor	28	–	–	–	32	31	+1	26	
10	Hapoel HaTzair Haifa	28	–	–	–	36	42	−6	25	
11	Beitar Kiryat Shmona	28	–	–	–	39	50	−11	22	
12	Maccabi Tiberias	28	–	–	–	21	35	−14	22	
13	Beitar Tiberias	28	–	–	–	39	49	−10	20	
14	Hapoel Ein Harod	28	–	–	–	33	56	−23	19	Relegated to Liga Gimel
15	Hapoel Karmiel	27	–	–	–	25	74	−49	14	Relegated to Liga Gimel

Hapoel Kfar Ruppin folded. as a result, the spare place in the division was filled by promoting extra club from Liga Gimel.

== North Division B ==
Pos	Team	Pld	W	D	L	GF	GA	GD	Pts	Promotion or relegation
1	Hapoel Nazareth Illit	28	–	–	–	75	31	+44	42	Promoted to Liga Alef
2	Hapoel Ra'anana	28	–	–	–	48	15	+33	42	Promoted to Liga Alef
3	Hapoel Tayibe	28	–	–	–	42	24	+18	39	
4	Maccabi Zikhron Ya'akov	28	–	–	–	47	31	+16	37	
5	Hapoel Migdal HaEmek	28	–	–	–	56	51	+5	29	
6	Hapoel Givat Olga	28	–	–	–	38	38	0	27	
7	Hapoel Kafr Qara	28	–	–	–	36	44	−8	25	
8	Hapoel Beit Eliezer	28	–	–	–	30	43	−13	23	
9	Hapoel Geva HaCarmel	28	–	–	–	32	49	−17	23	
10	Hapoel Afula	28	–	–	–	32	39	−7	22	
11	Hapoel Binyamina	28	–	–	–	35	43	−8	22	
12	Maccabi HaSharon Netanya	28	–	–	–	32	46	−14	22	
13	Beitar Dov Netanya	28	–	–	–	34	57	−23	22	
14	Hapoel Givat Haim	28	–	–	–	38	47	−9	21	Relegated to Liga Gimel
15	Hapoel Kiryat Tiv'on	28	–	–	–	44	61	−17	19	Relegated to Liga Gimel

== South Division A ==
Pos	Team	Pld	W	D	L	GF	GA	GD	Pts	Promotion or relegation
1	Hapoel Or Yehuda	28	–	–	–	72	22	+50	42	Promoted to Liga Alef
2	Hapoel Rosh HaAyin	28	–	–	–	58	21	+37	38 (Note: No points or goals were awarded for Hapoel Rosh HaAyin - Beitar Lod due to suspicions of bribery in the match, which ended 5-0. furthermore, two points deducted from both clubs.)	Promoted to Liga Alef
3	Hapoel Kiryat Ono	28	–	–	–	50	17	+33	38 (Note: No points or goals were awarded for Hapoel Kiryat Ono - Maccabi Yehud due to suspicions of bribery in the match, which ended 10-0. furthermore, two points deducted from both clubs.)	
4	Hapoel Aliyah Kfar Saba	28	–	–	–	48	36	+12	34	
5	Beitar Holon	28	–	–	–	47	38	+9	29	
6	Tzafririm Holon	28	–	–	–	51	45	+6	29	
7	Hapoel Kfar Shalem	28	–	–	–	41	39	+2	29	
8	Hapoel Kafr Qasim	28	–	–	–	40	45	−5	26	
9	Beitar Bat Yam	28	–	–	–	31	39	−8	25	
10	Maccabi Yehud	28	–	–	–	26	43	−17	22	
11	Hapoel Giv'atayim	28	–	–	–	36	62	−26	22	
12	Beitar Herzliya	28	–	–	–	32	48	−16	21	
13	Beitar Ramat Gan	28	–	–	–	26	52	−26	18	
14	Hapoel Hod HaSharon	28	–	–	–	34	62	−28	17	Relegated to Liga Gimel
15	Beitar Lod	28	–	–	–	36	59	−23	14	Relegated to Liga Gimel

== South Division B ==
Pos	Team	Pld	W	D	L	GF	GA	GD	Pts	Promotion or relegation
1	Maccabi Yavne	28	–	–	–	44	18	+26	40	Promoted to Liga Alef
2	Hapoel Ashkelon	28	–	–	–	48	17	+31	39	Promoted to Liga Alef
3	Beitar Be'er Sheva	28	–	–	–	55	29	+26	39	
4	Hapoel Ofakim	28	–	–	–	39	37	+2	29	
5	Maccabi Kiryat Gat	28	–	–	–	35	40	−5	28	
6	Maccabi Ramla	28	–	–	–	35	41	−6	28	
7	Hapoel Kiryat Gat	28	–	–	–	36	34	+2	27	
8	Hapoel Gedera	28	–	–	–	45	50	−5	27	
9	Maccabi Ashkelon	28	–	–	–	42	45	−3	25	
10	Beitar Ashkelon	28	–	–	–	38	46	−8	25	
11	Hapoel Merhavim	28	–	–	–	33	35	−2	24	
12	Hapoel Shikun HaMizrah	28	–	–	–	36	43	−7	24	
13	Hapoel Eilat	28	–	–	–	37	47	−10	23	
14	Maccabi Jerusalem	28	–	–	–	38	59	−21	22 (Note: Maccabi Jerusalem were docked six points for not showing up for their match against Hapoel Gedera.)	Relegated to Liga Gimel
15	Maccabi Be'er Sheva	28	–	–	–	26	46	−20	14	Relegated to Liga Gimel
