= 1976–77 Liga Artzit =

The 1976–77 Liga Artzit season was the first in which Liga Artzit came into existence. the league had 12 clubs (expanded to 14 the next season as three clubs were relegated from the Liga Leumit and only one promoted).

Hapoel Hadera won the title and promotion to Liga Leumit. Only one club was promoted as Liga Leumit was being reduced in size from 16 to 14 clubs.

Beitar Netanya and Maccabi Hadera were both relegated to Liga Alef

== Final table ==
Pos	Team	Pld	W	D	L	GF	GA	GD	Pts	Promotion or relegation
1	Hapoel Hadera	22	13	7	2	41	24	+17	33	Promoted to Liga Leumit
2	Bnei Yehuda	22	11	9	2	39	16	+23	31	
3	Hapoel Ramat Gan	22	11	8	3	32	13	+19	30	
4	Maccabi Sha'arayim	22	11	6	5	25	19	+6	28	
5	Hapoel Petah Tikva	22	8	8	6	32	21	+11	24	
6	Hapoel Holon	22	8	7	7	20	23	−3	23	
7	Hapoel Netanya	22	9	3	10	34	33	+1	21	
8	Hapoel Rishon LeZion	22	4	12	6	20	25	−5	20	
9	Maccabi Ramat Amidar	22	5	8	9	19	27	−8	18	
10	Hapoel Ashdod	22	3	10	9	15	24	−9	16	
11	Beitar Netanya	22	5	6	11	16	27	−11	16	Relegated to Liga Alef
12	Maccabi Hadera	22	1	2	19	15	56	−41	4	Relegated to Liga Alef
