= 1979–80 Liga Artzit =

The 1979–80 Liga Artzit season saw Hapoel Jerusalem win the title and win promotion to Liga Leumit. Hapoel Ramat Gan and Hapoel Rishon LeZion were also promoted.

Hapoel Bat Yam, Hapoel Tirat HaCarmel and Hapoel Herzliya were all relegated to Liga Alef.

== Final table ==
Pos	Team	Pld	W	D	L	GF	GA	GD	Pts	Promotion or relegation
1	Hapoel Jerusalem	30	15	12	3	37	13	+24	42	Promoted to Liga Leumit
2	Hapoel Ramat Gan	30	13	13	4	36	19	+17	39	Promoted to Liga Leumit
3	Hapoel Rishon LeZion	30	15	8	7	35	18	+17	38	Promoted to Liga Leumit
4	Hapoel Acre	30	14	7	9	46	35	+11	35	
5	Hapoel Lod	30	11	11	8	36	33	+3	33	
6	Hapoel Beit She'an	30	12	8	10	30	25	+5	32	
7	Maccabi Haifa	30	12	7	11	29	25	+4	31	
8	Hapoel Tiberias	30	10	8	12	39	43	−4	28	
9	Hapoel Nazareth Illit	30	9	10	11	29	34	−5	28	
10	Hapoel Beit Shemesh	30	8	11	11	32	40	−8	27	
11	Maccabi Herzliya	30	8	10	12	25	27	−2	26	
12	Hapoel Hadera	30	7	14	9	23	25	−2	26 (Note: 2 points deducted)	
13	Hapoel Holon	30	5	16	9	23	30	−7	26	
14	Hapoel Bat Yam	30	7	12	11	27	43	−16	26	Relegated to Liga Alef
15	Hapoel Tirat HaCarmel	30	6	10	14	24	38	−14	22	Relegated to Liga Alef
16	Hapoel Herzliya	30	5	9	16	20	43	−23	19	Relegated to Liga Alef
