= Mamadou Touré Thiam =

Senegalese footballer

Mamadou Touré
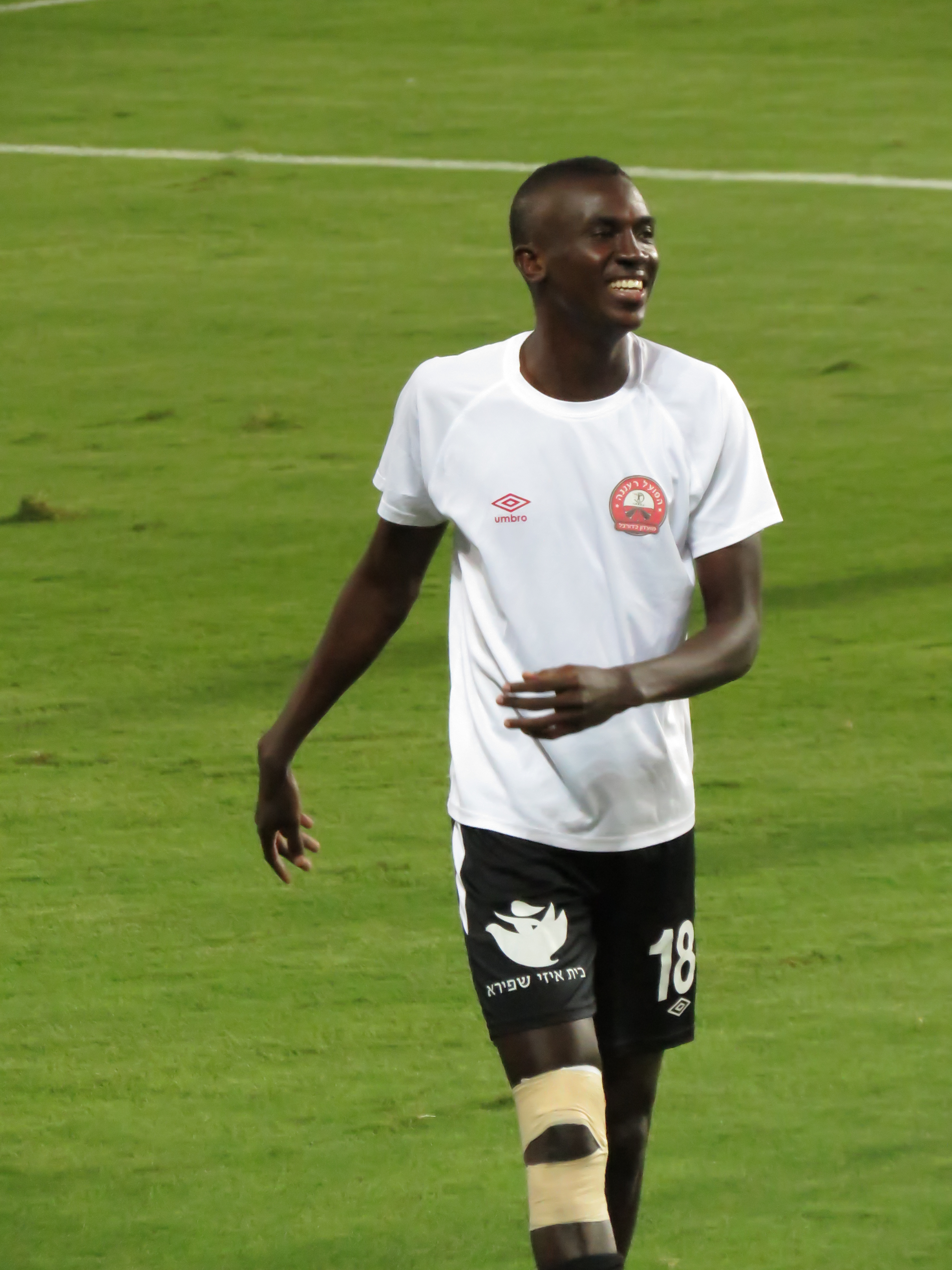
- Mamadou playing for Hapoel Ra'anana in 2015

Personal information
- Full name: Mamadou Touré Thiam
- Date of birth: 22 October 1992 (age 34)
- Place of birth: Senegal
- Height: 1.87 m (6 ft 1 1/2 in)
- Position: Forward

Team information
- Current team: Maccabi Sha'arayim
- Number: 92

Senior career*
Years	Team	Apps	(Gls)
2011–2012	Hapoel Ramat Gan	23	(6)
2012–2016	Hapoel Ra'anana	102	(27)
2016–2017	Maccabi Sha'arayim	15	(4)
2017–2018	Maccabi Herzliya	16	(2)
- * Club domestic league appearances and goals as of 19 January 2017 (UTC)

Mamadou Touré (born 22 October 1992, in Senegal), also known as Thiam Mamadou, is a Senegalese footballer.
