= 1994–95 Liga Artzit =

The 1994–95 Liga Artzit season saw Maccabi Jaffa and Hapoel Kfar Saba promoted to Liga Leumit, whilst Hapoel Ashkelon and Hapoel Lod were relegated to Liga Alef.

== Final table ==
Pos	Team	Pld	W	D	L	GF	GA	GD	Pts	Promotion or relegation
1	Maccabi Jaffa	30	13	10	7	36	27	+9	49	Promoted to Liga Leumit
2	Hapoel Kfar Saba	30	13	9	8	46	32	+14	48	Promoted to Liga Leumit
3	Hakoah Ramat Gan	30	13	9	8	40	31	+9	48	
4	Hapoel Bat Yam	30	12	10	8	46	35	+11	46	
5	Hapoel Tayibe	30	11	10	9	25	23	+2	43	
6	Maccabi Kiryat Gat	30	11	9	10	43	38	+5	42	
7	Hapoel Ramat Gan	30	11	9	10	38	36	+2	42	
8	Hapoel Ashdod	30	11	7	12	46	42	+4	40	
9	Maccabi Yavne	30	10	10	10	33	35	−2	40	
10	Shimshon Tel Aviv	30	11	5	14	39	44	−5	38	
11	Hapoel Hadera	30	9	9	12	33	33	0	36	
12	SK Nes Tziona	30	9	9	12	38	39	−1	36	
13	Hapoel Jerusalem	30	9	9	12	44	50	−6	36	
14	Hapoel Kiryat Shmona	30	9	9	12	28	41	−13	36	
15	Hapoel Ashkelon	30	8	11	11	34	43	−9	35	Relegated to Liga Alef
16	Hapoel Lod	30	7	11	12	28	48	−20	32	Relegated to Liga Alef
