= 1999–2000 Liga Artzit =

The 1999–2000 Liga Artzit season was the first in which Liga Artzit was the third tier of Israeli football due to the formation of the Israeli Premier League. Only the champions, Hapoel Ramat Gan, were promoted as restructuring continued in the divisions above.

Hapoel Ironi Dimona and Hapoel Iksal were relegated to Liga Alef. At the end of the season Beitar Tel Aviv and Shimshon Tel Aviv merged to form Beitar Shimshon Tel Aviv. The spare place in the division was filled by promoting the third-best club from Liga Alef rather than reprieving Hapoel Ironi Dimona.

== Final table ==
Pos	Team	Pld	W	D	L	GF	GA	GD	Pts	Promotion or relegation
1	Hapoel Ramat Gan	33	20	7	6	62	30	+32	67	Promoted to Liga Leumit
2	Beitar Tel Aviv	33	21	2	10	52	27	+25	65	
3	Hapoel Ra'anana	33	19	4	10	63	34	+29	61	
4	Hapoel Bat Yam	33	17	4	12	62	42	+20	54 (Note: One point deducted for violating budget rules.)	
5	Maccabi Sha'arayim	33	16	6	11	51	43	+8	54	
6	Shimshon Tel Aviv	33	15	4	14	44	38	+6	49	
7	Hapoel Tayibe	33	11	10	12	42	43	−1	41 (Note: Two points deducted for violating budget rules.)	
8	Hapoel Acre	33	10	11	12	42	56	−14	41	
9	Hapoel Nazareth Illit	33	10	8	15	41	47	−6	38	
10	Maccabi Kafr Kanna	33	10	7	16	50	57	−7	37	
11	Hapoel Ironi Dimona	33	9	9	15	32	51	−19	36	Relegated to Liga Alef
12	Hapoel Iksal	33	2	4	27	14	87	−73	7 (Note: Three points deducted (two for using an ineligible player, one for violating budget rules).)	Relegated to Liga Alef

Source: rsssf.com
