= 1978–79 Liga Artzit =

The 1978–79 Liga Artzit season saw Hakoah Ramat Gan win the title and win promotion to Liga Leumit. Maccabi Ramat Amidar and Hapoel Petah Tikva were also promoted.

Hapoel Marmorek, Hapoel Netanya and Hapoel Ashdod were all relegated to Liga Alef.

== Final table ==
| Pos | Team | Pld | W | D | L | GF | GA | GD | Pts | Promotion or relegation |
|---|---|---|---|---|---|---|---|---|---|---|
| 1 | Hakoah Ramat Gan | 30 | 18 | 10 | 2 | 65 | 25 | +40 | 46 | Promoted to Liga Leumit |
| 2 | Maccabi Ramat Amidar | 30 | 16 | 7 | 7 | 46 | 19 | +27 | 39 | Promoted to Liga Leumit |
| 3 | Hapoel Petah Tikva | 30 | 13 | 12 | 5 | 40 | 24 | +16 | 38 | Promoted to Liga Leumit |
| 4 | Hapoel Holon | 30 | 13 | 7 | 10 | 27 | 24 | +3 | 33 | |
| 5 | Maccabi Haifa | 30 | 11 | 10 | 9 | 34 | 32 | +2 | 32 | |
| 6 | Maccabi Herzliya | 30 | 10 | 12 | 8 | 28 | 30 | −2 | 32 | |
| 7 | Hapoel Acre | 30 | 10 | 11 | 9 | 35 | 28 | +7 | 31 | |
| 8 | Hapoel Ramat Gan | 30 | 10 | 10 | 10 | 33 | 38 | −5 | 30 | |
| 9 | Hapoel Tiberias | 30 | 9 | 11 | 10 | 33 | 35 | −2 | 29 | |
| 10 | Hapoel Beit She'an | 30 | 12 | 5 | 13 | 26 | 30 | −4 | 29 | |
| 11 | Hapoel Bat Yam | 30 | 9 | 11 | 10 | 28 | 32 | −4 | 29 | |
| 12 | Hapoel Lod | 30 | 8 | 12 | 10 | 26 | 25 | +1 | 28 | |
| 13 | Hapoel Tirat HaCarmel | 30 | 10 | 8 | 12 | 28 | 29 | −1 | 28 | |
| 14 | Hapoel Marmorek | 30 | 8 | 11 | 11 | 24 | 28 | −4 | 27 | Relegated to Liga Alef |
| 15 | Hapoel Netanya | 30 | 2 | 11 | 17 | 20 | 48 | −28 | 15 | Relegated to Liga Alef |
| 16 | Hapoel Ashdod | 30 | 4 | 6 | 20 | 21 | 67 | −46 | 14 | Relegated to Liga Alef |
