= 1983–84 Liga Artzit =

The 1983–84 Liga Artzit season saw Hapoel Haifa win the title and promotion to Liga Leumit. Hapoel Kfar Saba and Hapoel Petah Tikva were also promoted.

Hapoel Beit She'an, Hapoel Nazareth Illit and Hapoel Beit Shemesh were all relegated to Liga Alef.

== Final table ==
Pos	Team	Pld	W	D	L	GF	GA	GD	Pts	Promotion or relegation
1	Hapoel Haifa	30	15	9	6	43	24	+19	54	Promoted to Liga Leumit
2	Hapoel Kfar Saba	30	14	10	6	43	19	+24	52	Promoted to Liga Leumit
3	Hapoel Petah Tikva	30	14	10	6	38	18	+20	52	Promoted to Liga Leumit
4	Hapoel Rishon LeZion	30	14	8	8	42	26	+16	50	
5	Hapoel Hadera	30	11	12	7	35	29	+6	45	
6	Hapoel Ashkelon	30	11	10	9	37	27	+10	43	
7	Hapoel Ramat Gan	30	11	10	9	26	25	+1	43	
8	Hapoel Jerusalem	30	11	7	12	36	40	−4	40	
9	Beitar Haifa	30	12	4	14	27	39	−12	40	
10	Beitar Ramla	30	8	14	8	21	21	0	38	
11	Hapoel Holon	30	9	10	11	31	34	−3	37	
12	Hapoel Kiryat Shmona	30	9	9	12	33	39	−6	36	
13	Hapoel Marmorek	30	7	11	12	31	43	−12	32	
14	Hapoel Beit She'an	30	6	10	14	26	42	−16	28	Relegated to Liga Alef
15	Hapoel Nazareth Illit	30	6	10	14	25	49	−24	28	Relegated to Liga Alef
16	Hapoel Beit Shemesh	30	4	12	14	30	49	−19	24	Relegated to Liga Alef
