= 1977–78 Liga Artzit =

The 1977–78 Liga Artzit season saw Bnei Yehuda win the title and win promotion to Liga Leumit. Maccabi Petah Tikva, Hapoel Kfar Saba and Hapoel Rishon LeZion were also promoted as Liga Leumit expanded from 14 to 16 clubs.

Hapoel Beit Shemesh and Maccabi Sha'arayim were both relegated to Liga Alef.

== Final table ==
Pos	Team	Pld	W	D	L	GF	GA	GD	Pts	Promotion or relegation
1	Bnei Yehuda	26	20	3	3	61	20	+41	43	Promoted to Liga Leumit
2	Maccabi Petah Tikva	26	16	4	6	35	24	+11	36	Promoted to Liga Leumit
3	Hapoel Kfar Saba	26	14	7	5	39	22	+17	35	Promoted to Liga Leumit
4	Hapoel Rishon LeZion	26	12	9	5	31	19	+12	33	Promoted to Liga Leumit
5	Hapoel Petah Tikva	26	11	8	7	37	27	+10	30	
6	Maccabi Haifa	26	9	7	10	32	31	+1	25	
7	Maccabi Ramat Amidar	26	7	9	10	23	23	0	23	
8	Hapoel Holon	26	7	9	10	23	28	−5	23	
9	Hapoel Netanya	26	9	5	12	32	43	−11	23	
10	Hapoel Tirat HaCarmel	26	3	13	10	22	33	−11	19	
11	Hapoel Ashdod	26	6	7	13	18	29	−11	19	
12	Hapoel Ramat Gan	26	8	3	15	22	38	−16	19	
13	Hapoel Beit Shemesh	26	5	9	12	14	33	−19	19	Relegated to Liga Alef
14	Maccabi Sha'arayim	26	6	5	15	29	48	−19	17	Relegated to Liga Alef
