= 2000–01 Liga Artzit =

Israeli football league season

The 2000–01 Liga Artzit season saw Hapoel Ra'anana win the title and promotion to Liga Leumit alongside runners-up Maccabi Kafr Kanna. Maccabi Ashkelon and Maccabi Sha'arayim were relegated to Liga Alef.

== Final table ==
Pos	Team	Pld	W	D	L	GF	GA	GD	Pts	Promotion or relegation
1	Hapoel Ra'anana	33	16	7	10	40	29	+11	55	Promoted to Liga Leumit
2	Maccabi Kafr Kanna	33	16	8	9	48	35	+13	54 (Note: Two points deducted; one for player violence and one for violating budget rules.)	Promoted to Liga Leumit
3	Hapoel Majd al-Krum	33	15	5	13	51	55	−4	50	
4	Beitar Shimshon Tel Aviv	33	13	10	10	43	34	+9	49	
5	Hapoel Ashkelon	33	13	8	12	52	46	+6	47	
6	Ironi Nir Ramat HaSharon	33	11	12	10	49	49	0	45	
7	Hapoel Tayibe	33	12	9	12	50	47	+3	44 (Note: One point deducted for player violence.)	
8	Hapoel Acre	33	9	14	10	39	40	−1	41	
9	Hapoel Bat Yam	33	9	14	10	31	35	−4	41	
10	Hapoel Nazareth Illit	33	11	8	14	33	42	−9	41	
11	Maccabi Ashkelon	33	9	14	10	36	36	0	39 (Note: Two points deducted for violating budget rules.)	Relegated to Liga Alef
12	Maccabi Sha'arayim	33	6	7	20	33	57	−24	25	Relegated to Liga Alef

Source: rsssf.com
