= 1985–86 Liga Artzit =

The 1985–86 Liga Artzit season saw Beitar Netanya promoted to Liga Leumit for the first time in the club's history. Beitar Tel Aviv and Hapoel Lod were also promoted.

At the other end of the table, Hapoel Ramat HaSharon, Hapoel Beit Shemesh and Beitar Haifa were all relegated to Liga Alef. Beitar Netanya's Israel Fogel was the league's top scorer with 17 goals.

== Final table ==
Pos	Team	Pld	W	D	L	GF	GA	GD	Pts	Promotion or relegation
1	Beitar Netanya	30	17	8	5	54	29	+25	59	Promoted to Liga Leumit
2	Beitar Tel Aviv	30	16	7	7	54	27	+27	55	Promoted to Liga Leumit
3	Hapoel Lod	30	13	11	6	35	25	+10	50	Promoted to Liga Leumit
4	Tzafririm Holon	30	13	8	9	35	33	+2	47	
5	Hapoel Hadera	30	12	8	10	35	32	+3	44	
6	Hapoel Tiberias	30	12	8	10	35	35	0	44	
7	Maccabi Ramat Amidar	30	11	11	8	25	31	−6	44	
8	Hapoel Marmorek	30	11	8	11	36	36	0	41	
9	Hapoel Acre	30	10	10	10	36	31	+5	40	
10	Beitar Ramla	30	8	14	8	26	26	0	38	
11	Hapoel Ramat Gan	30	10	7	13	35	35	0	37	
12	Hakoah Ramat Gan	30	10	6	14	22	34	−12	36	
13	Hapoel Yehud	30	8	11	11	32	29	+3	35	
14	Hapoel Ramat HaSharon	30	8	11	11	32	37	−5	35	Relegated to Liga Alef
15	Hapoel Beit Shemesh	30	5	9	16	23	47	−24	24	Relegated to Liga Alef
16	Beitar Haifa	30	2	11	17	20	48	−28	17	Relegated to Liga Alef

Source: rsssf.com
