= Maccabi Ashkelon F.C. =

Israeli football club

Maccabi Ashkelon
- Full name: Maccabi Ashkelon Football Club מכבי אשקלון
- Founded: 1962; 2015 (Re-established)
- Dissolved: 2001
- Ground: Sala Stadium, Ashkelon
- Capacity: 5,250
- Chairman: Meny Yasso
- Manager: Dudu Vaturi
- League: Liga Gimel South
| Home colours | Away colours |

Maccabi Ashkelon (Hebrew: מכבי אשקלון) is an Israeli football club based in Ashkelon.

== History ==
The club was founded in 1962 and played mostly in the lower divisions of Israeli football. In their first season of existence, Maccabi won Liga Gimel South B division and achieved promotion to Liga Bet, then the third tier of Israeli football. In the following season, the club finished second bottom in Liga Bet South B division and dropped back to Liga Gimel. Maccabi returned to Liga Bet in the 1969–70 season, and after three seasons in the third tier, relegated again at the end of the 1971–72 season. In 1975–76, the club returned to Liga Bet, which at the end of the season, became the fourth tier of Israeli football, following the creation of Liga Artzit. Maccabi played in the fourth tier until the 1983–84 season, in which they finished bottom of the South B division and relegated to Liga Gimel.

In the 1990s, the club started a period of success and reached Liga Alef, the third tier, in the 1997–98 season. At the end of the 1998–99 season, in which the club was one place short from promotion to Liga Artzit, Liga Alef became the fourth tier, following the creation of the Israeli Premier League. However, in the following season, Maccabi won the South division and achieved promotion to Liga Artzit. In the 2000–01 Liga Artzit, the only season in which the club played in a nationwide division, Maccabi had a better goal difference than Hapoel Nazareth Illit in the battle against relegation, and after the season ended, they were deducted two points for violation of the budget rules and as a result, relegated to Liga Alef. The club folded during the summer of 2001, following a debt of more than 2,000,000 NIS.

During their last five years of existence, up until March 2001, Maccabi Ashkelon were managed by former Israel international and Hapoel Tel Aviv player, Moris Zano.

In 2015, the club was re-founded by Manny Yasso. The club participates in Liga Gimel South district and now operate as a youth team for under-14s.
