= Hapoel Beit Shemesh F.C. =

Hapoel Beit Shemesh
- Full name: Hapoel Beit Shemesh Football Club מועדון כדורגל הפועל בית שמש
- Founded: 1958
- Dissolved: 1994

Hapoel Beit Shemesh Football Club (Hebrew: מועדון כדורגל הפועל בית שמש) was an Israeli football club based at Beit Shemesh. In its prime the club played in the second tier of the Israeli football league system. The club was dissolved in 1994 due to financial difficulties. A successor club, Ironi Beit Shemesh, plays in Liga Bet.

== History ==
The club was founded in 1958 and started its way in Liga Gimel, then the fourth tier of the league system. The club was disbanded briefly in 1960, but was re-established shortly afterwards and played the next season in Liga Gimel.

At the end of the 1964–65 season the club was promoted to Liga Bet after reaching second place in the promotion play-offs, where it played for the next five years. At the end of the 1969–70 season the club was ranked third in the South B division of Liga Bet, but was promoted after first and second ranked clubs, Hapoel Ramla and Hapoel Ashdod were disqualified from promotion due to suspicions of bribery and match fixing.

In 1976–77 the club topped the South division of Liga Alef and was promoted to second tier Liga Artzit. The club suffered immediate relegation the following season, but bounced back and promoted from Liga Alef after once again topping the division.

The club remained in Liga Artzit, with its best final position being the 10th, until relegating at the end of the 1983–84 season. The club bounced back to Liga Artizt once more, but ended in the relegation zone after only one season. The club relegated even further to Liga Bet and played in the lower divisions until it had to fold due to financial difficulties in 1994.

== Honours ==
=== League ===
| Honour | No. | Years |
|---|---|---|
| Third tier | 3 | 1976–77, 1978–79, 1984–85 |
| Fourth tier | 1 | 1964–65 |
