= Hapoel Tirat HaCarmel F.C. =

Israeli football club

Hapoel Tirat HaCarmel
- Full name: Hapoel Tirat HaCarmel Football Club הפועל טירת הכרמל
- Founded: 1949; 2013 (Refounded)
- Ground: Avi Ran, Haifa
- Chairman: Avi Sa'adon
- Manager: Lior Tal
- League: Liga Bet North B
- 2024–25: Liga Bet North B, 2nd
Home colours	Away colours

Hapoel Tirat HaCarmel (Hebrew: הפועל טירת הכרמל) is an Israeli football club based in Tirat Carmel. The club currently plays in Liga Gimel Samaria division and play home matches at the Avi Ran Ground in Haifa.

== History ==
The club have spent 12 seasons in the second tier of Israeli football. They were promoted to the second tier for the first time, after they won Liga Bet North B division in the 1968–69 season. In the 1971–72 season, and once more, in the 1972–73 season, the club reached their best placing to date, after they finished fourth in Liga Alef North division, in both seasons. The club remained in the second tier until 1976, when Liga Artzit came into existence and became the new second tier of Israeli football, whilst Liga Alef became the third tier. The club finished the 1975–76 season in the ninth place, and was not promoted to Liga Artzit. However, in the following season, the club won Liga Alef North, and were promoted to the new second tier. After narrowly escaping relegation in the 1977–78 season thanks to better goal difference, and again in the following season, the club was relegated back to Liga Alef at the end of the 1979–80 season, after they finished second bottom in Liga Artzit.

10 years later, the club returned to Liga Artzit, and finished eleventh in the 1989–90 season. They were relegated in the following season after they finished bottom, with only three wins. The club suffered further relegations, and folded.

The club was refounded in 2013, and played the 2013–14 season in Liga Gimel Samaria division, where they faced their city rivals, Maccabi Tirat HaCarmel for the first derby in Tirat Carmel after 19 years.

== Honours ==
=== League ===
Honour	No.	Years
Third tier	4	1954–55, 1968–69, 1976–77, 1988–89
Fourth tier	1	1962–63
