= F.C. Ironi Or Yehuda =

Israeli football club

- Full name: Moadon Kaduregel Ironi Or Yehuda מועדון כדורגל עירוני אור יהודה
- Founded: 2005
- Ground: Naaman Ground, Or Yehuda
- Capacity: 700
- Chairman: Ilan Romano
- Manager: Ya'akov Tal
- League: Liga Bet South A
- 2023–24: Liga Alef South (Group A), 9th (relegated)
Home colours	Away colours

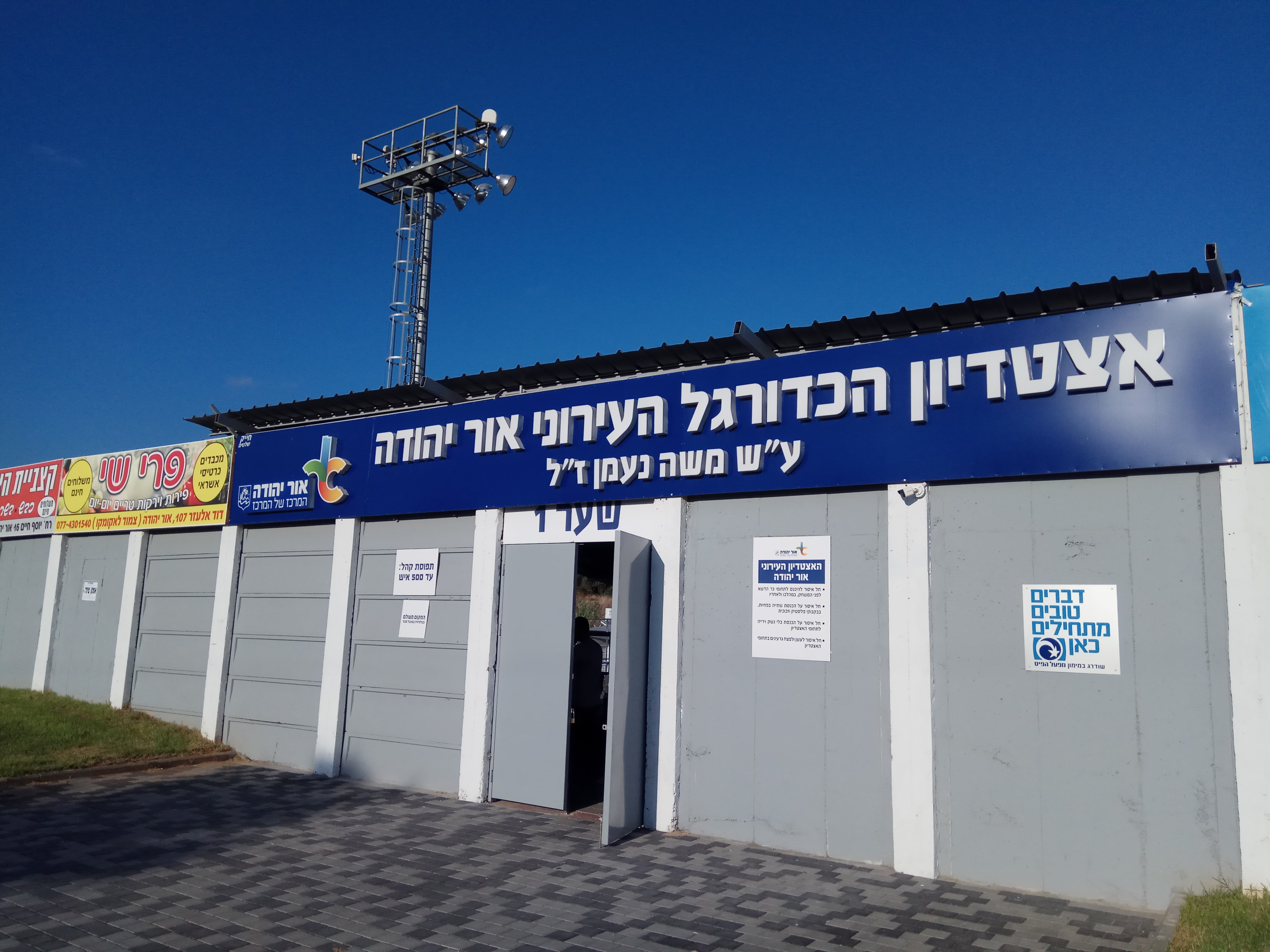
Naaman Ground

F.C. Ironi Or Yehuda (Hebrew: מועדון כדורגל עירוני אור יהודה), Moadon Kaduregel Ironi Or Yehuda, lit. Municipal Football Club Or Yehuda (or in short Hebrew: מ.כ. עירוני אור יהודה, Mem Kaf Ironi Or Yehuda, lit. F.C. Ironi Or Yehuda) is an Israeli football club based in Or Yehuda. The club is currently in Liga Alef South division.

== History ==
The club was founded in 2005, after the previous club of the city, Hapoel Or Yehuda (which in its prime finished runners-up in Liga Alef South division), dissolved at the end of the 2004–05 season while playing in Liga Bet.

F.C. Ironi Or Yehuda started the 2005–06 season in Liga Gimel Tel Aviv division, where they finished runners-up, one point behind champions, Shikun Vatikim Ramat Gan. In the following season, the club won the Tel Aviv division, and were promoted to Liga Bet, where they play since. The club's best placing to date came at the 2011–12 season, when they finished runners-up in Liga Bet South A division.

In 2019, the team's goalkeeper, Isaak Hayik, aged 73, broke the Guinness record for oldest player in a league match.

== Honours ==
=== League ===
Honour	No.	Years
Third tier	1	1975–76^{1}
Fourth tier	2	1984–85^{1}, 2018-19
Sixth tier	1	2006–07

^{1}As Hapoel Or Yehuda
