= Hapoel Afikim F.C. =

Hapoel Afikim
- Full name: Hapoel Afikim Football Club הפועל אפיקים
- Founded: 1948
- Dissolved: 1990s
- Ground: Afikim Ground, Afikim
Home colours	Away colours

Hapoel Afikim (Hebrew: הפועל אפיקים) was an Israeli football club based in the Kibbutz of Afikim. The club played for eighteen successive seasons at the third tier of Israeli football league system.

== History ==
The earliest documented match by members of the Kibbutz was played in May 1929, while they lived in what is today Kvutzat Kinneret. Footballers of the local Hapoel club met Hapoel Tiberias and won 1–0. Hapoel members continued to play football occasionally in the following years. The club was officially founded in 1948. During its early days, Hapoel Afikim played mostly in friendlies against nearby clubs and in regional league, comprising clubs from the Jordan Valley region, before folding in 1955 due to lack of proper reserve players.

The club reformed prior to the 1962–63 season and joined Liga Gimel Valleys division. At the end of the season, the club finished runners-up, with 129 goals scored, and achieved promotion to Liga Bet, the third tier of Israeli football at the time. In the 1975–76 season, the club finished runners-up in Liga Bet North A division and achieved promotion to Liga Alef. However, at the end of that season, Liga Artzit came into existence and became the new second tier of Israeli football, whilst Liga Alef demoted to the third tier. After six seasons playing at the North division of Liga Alef, Afikim were relegated to Liga Bet, following second bottom finish in the 1981–82 season. Five years later, in 1986–87, the club finished at the bottom of Liga Bet North A division and relegated to Liga Gimel, the fifth and lowest tier, where they remained until folding at the mid-1990s.

In 2008, a boarding house site was built over the club's football ground.

=== Cup performance ===
The club's best achievement in the Israel State Cup came in 1964–65, when progressed to the quarter-finals, where they narrowly defeated 0–1 by top flight club, Maccabi Petah Tikva. The club also made a remarkable run in 1982–83, while playing in Liga Bet, after they eliminated Ironi Ashdod of Liga Alef, 4–2 on penalties, after 2–2 draw, and Hapoel Tel Hanan of Liga Artzit, 2–1, and reached the seventh round, where they lost 0–3 to the eventual runners-up, Maccabi Tel Aviv, in Bloomfield Stadium.

== Notable former players ==
- Ami Ayalon

== Notable former managers ==
- Abba Gindin
