= Liga Artzit =

Israeli football league

- Founded: 1976; 50 years ago
- Folded: 2009; 17 years ago
- Country: Israel
- Confederation: UEFA
- Number of clubs: 12
- Level on pyramid: 3
- Promotion to: Liga Leumit
- Relegation to: Liga Alef
- Domestic cup(s): State Cup; Toto Cup Artzit

Liga Artzit (Hebrew: ליגה ארצית, lit. Country League) is the defunct third division of Israeli Football League, beneath its highest division Premier League and the second division Liga Leumit. Before being cancelled in 2009, it was run by the Israel Football Association. It was replaced by Liga Alef.

== Structure ==
There were 12 teams in Liga Artzit. Each team played 33 matches; the first 22 matches were played on a home and away basis, with the last 11 fixtures based on league positions after 22 games. Like the majority of leagues in the world, three points were awarded for a win, one for a draw and zero for a loss. Final League positions were determined firstly by points obtained, then by goal difference, then goals scored, and if necessary, a mini-league of the results between two or more teams ranked using the previous three criteria and finally a series of one or more play off matches.

In the past at the end of the season, providing they met certain criteria, the top two teams weren promoted to Liga Leumit, and were replaced by the bottom two teams from that league. The teams finishing 11th and 12th in Liga Artzit were relegated to Liga Alef, where they were assigned to a geographically suitable division. They were replaced by the champions of Liga Alef North and Liga Alef South providing they meet criteria for entry into Liga Artzit.

However, the league was abolished at the end of the 2008–09 season as part of structural reforms to the Israeli league system that saw the Premier League and Liga Leumit both expanded to 16 clubs. At the end of the season the top seven clubs were promoted to Liga Leumit; the 8th placed club was played in a play-off round against the 11th placed club in Liga Leumit for a place in Liga Leumit, whilst the 9–12th placed clubs was relegated to Liga Alef.

== History ==
Liga Artzit came into existence in 1976 with a restructuring of Israeli football. It replaced Liga Alef as the second division (below Liga Leumit), and unlike its regionalised predecessor, was a nationwide league (hence its name). For its first season, Liga Artzit comprised twelve teams. Four teams were demoted from Liga Leumit as it was reduced in size, and the top four clubs from Liga Alef North and Liga Alef South were promoted. In later seasons the number of members varied, though the usual number of clubs was 16.

In 1999, Liga Artzit was demoted to the third tier after the creation of the Premier League. Since then it has consisted of 12 teams.

In 2009, Liga Artzit was closed.

=== Previous seasons ===
Season	Winner	Also promoted	Relegated
Second tier
1976–77	Hapoel Hadera		Beitar Netanya, Maccabi Hadera
1977–78	Bnei Yehuda	Maccabi Petah Tikva, Hapoel Kfar Saba, Hapoel Rishon LeZion	Hapoel Beit Shemesh, Maccabi Sha'arayim
1978–79	Hakoah Ramat Gan	Maccabi Ramat Amidar, Hapoel Petah Tikva	Hapoel Marmorek, Hapoel Netanya, Hapoel Ashdod
1979–80	Hapoel Jerusalem	Hapoel Ramat Gan, Hapoel Rishon LeZion	Hapoel Bat Yam, Hapoel Tirat HaCarmel, Hapoel Herzliya
1980–81	Beitar Tel Aviv	Beitar Jerusalem, Maccabi Haifa	Hapoel Hadera, Hapoel Holon, Maccabi Herzliya
1981–82	Hapoel Lod	Hapoel Ramat Gan, Maccabi Yavne	Maccabi Kiryat Gat, Beitar Netanya, Hapoel Tiberias
1982–83	Beitar Tel Aviv	Hakoah Ramat Gan, Maccabi Ramat Amidar	Maccabi Shefa-'Amr, Hapoel Acre, Hapoel Tel Hanan
1983–84	Hapoel Haifa	Hapoel Kfar Saba, Hapoel Petah Tikva	Hapoel Beit She'an, Hapoel Nazareth Illit, Hapoel Beit Shemesh
1984–85	Bnei Yehuda	Maccabi Sha'arayim, Hapoel Jerusalem	Hapoel Ashkelon, Hapoel Rishon LeZion, Hapoel Kiryat Shmona
1985–86	Beitar Netanya	Beitar Tel Aviv, Hapoel Lod	Hapoel Ramat HaSharon, Hapoel Beit Shemesh, Beitar Haifa
1986–87	Tzafririm Holon		Hapoel Marmorek^{1}, Hapoel Beit She'an, Beitar Ramla, Beitar Nahariya, Hapoel Dimona
1987–88	Hapoel Jerusalem	Hapoel Tiberias	Hakoah Ramat Gan, Hapoel Acre
1988–89	Hapoel Ramat Gan		Hapoel Yehud, Beitar Ramla
1989–90	Tzafririm Holon	Hapoel Tel Aviv	Maccabi Tamra^{1}, Hapoel Rishon LeZion, Hapoel Lod
1990–91	Maccabi Petah Tikva	Maccabi Yavne	Hapoel Bat Yam^{1}, Maccabi Ramat Amidar, Hapoel Tirat HaCarmel
1991–92	Beitar Jerusalem	Hapoel Haifa	Beitar Netanya, Hapoel Tiberias
1992–93	Maccabi Herzliya	Ironi Ashdod, Hapoel Kfar Saba	Hapoel Ramat Gan, Maccabi Sha'arayim
1993–94	Hapoel Rishon LeZion	Hapoel Beit She'an, Beitar Tel Aviv	Maccabi Acre, Hapoel Daliyat al-Karmel
1994–95	Maccabi Jaffa	Hapoel Kfar Saba	Hapoel Ashkelon, Hapoel Lod
1995–96	Hapoel Tayibe	Hapoel Jerusalem	Shimshon Tel Aviv, Hapoel Kfar Shalem
1996–97	Hapoel Ashkelon	Ironi Ashdod	Hapoel Kiryat Shmona, Hapoel Hadera
1997–98	Maccabi Jaffa	Tzafririm Holon	Hapoel Ramat Gan, Maccabi Yavne
1998–99	Maccabi Netanya		Hapoel Ashdod, Beitar Tel Aviv, Hapoel Bat Yam, Maccabi Kafr Kanna, Hapoel Lod, SK Nes Tziona, Hapoel Tayibe
Third tier
1999–2000	Hapoel Ramat Gan		Hapoel Ironi Dimona, Hapoel Iksal
2000–01	Hapoel Ra'anana	Maccabi Kafr Kanna	Maccabi Ashkelon, Maccabi Sha'arayim
2001–02	Hapoel Jerusalem	Hapoel Nazareth Illit	Hapoel Tayibe, Maccabi Yavne
2002–03	Hakoah Ramat Gan	Ironi Kiryat Shmona	Hapoel Bat Yam, Hapoel Kafr Sumei
2003–04	Ironi Nir Ramat HaSharon	Hapoel Acre	Hapoel Tira, Hapoel Beit She'an
2004–05	Hapoel Ashkelon	Maccabi Be'er Sheva	Hapoel Majd al-Krum^{2}
2005–06	Hapoel Bnei Lod	Maccabi Ahi Nazareth	Tzafririm Holon, Maccabi Tzur Shalom
2006–07	Hapoel Ramat Gan	Hapoel Ironi Rishon LeZion	Hapoel Herzliya, Maccabi Be'er Sheva
2007–08	Hapoel Jerusalem	Maccabi Ironi Kiryat Ata	Maccabi HaShikma Ramat Hen, Hapoel Kfar Shalem
2008–09	Sektzia Nes Tziona	Hapoel Ashkelon, Hapoel Marmorek, Ironi Rishon LeZion, Ironi Bat Yam, Beitar Shimshon Tel Aviv, Hapoel Nazareth Illit	Maccabi Kafr Kanna, Bnei Tamra, Hapoel Umm al-Fahm, Hapoel Bnei Jadeidi, Maccabi Tirat HaCarmel

1. After promotion/relegation play-offs.

2. Maccabi Ironi Kiryat Ata finished in 11th place, but were reprieved when Maccabi Ramat Amidar folded.

== See also ==
- Sports in Israel
