= Hapoel Kiryat Shmona F.C. =

Hapoel Kiryat Shmona
- Full name: Hapoel Kiryat Shmona Football Club
- Nickname: Ha'Tzfoniyim (the Northerners)
- Founded: 1953; 72 years ago
- Dissolved: 2000; 25 years ago; merged with Maccabi Kiryat Shmona to form Hapoel Ironi Kiryat Shmona
- Ground: Ironi Stadium, Kiryat Shmona
- 1999–2000: Liga Alef North, 6th
Home colours	Away colours

Hapoel Kiryat Shmona (Hebrew: הפועל קריית שמונה) was an Israeli football club based in Kiryat Shmona. The club played at the Ironi Stadium, and ceased to exist in 2000 when it merged with Maccabi Kiryat Shmona to form Hapoel Ironi Kiryat Shmona.

== History ==
The club played in Liga Artzit (then the second division) in the early 1980s, but were relegated to Liga Alef in 1985. They returned to Liga Artzit in the mid-1990s, but were relegated back to Liga Alef at the end of the 1996–97 season.

Due to league restructuring, at the end of the 1998–99 season Liga Alef became the fourth tier. At the end of the 1999–2000 season the club was merged with Maccabi Kiryat Shmona to form Hapoel Ironi Kiryat Shmona at the initiative of businessman Izzy Sheratzky.

== Honours ==
=== League ===
Honour	No.	Years
Third tier	3	1964–65, 1966–68, 1979–80

=== Other ===
Honour	No.	Years
Mekorot Cup	1	1954
