= Maccabi Sha'arayim F.C. =

Israeli football club

Maccabi Sha'arayim
- Full name: Maccabi Sha'arayim Football Club
- Founded: 1950
- Ground: Maccabi Sha'araim Stadium, Rehovot
- Capacity: 500
- Chairman: Simcha Gad
- Manager: Doron Maman
- League: Liga Alef South
- 2023–24: Liga Alef South, 12th of 16
Home colours	Away colours

Maccabi Sha'araying's crest used in 2016–17 season

Maccabi Sha'araying's crest used from 2016-2022

Maccabi Sha'arayim (Hebrew: מכבי שעריים) is an Israeli football club from the city Rehovot, currently playing in Liga Alef.

The club spent the past seven seasons in the top division from 1963 to 1969, and a single season in 1985–86.

== History ==
The club was promoted to Liga Leumit (then the top division) for the first time in 1963. In their first season in the league they finished 11th out of 15. The following season the club finished sixth, which remains their highest ever league position.

In the 1965–66 season they narrowly avoided relegation, finishing one place above the relegation zone. In 1969 Maccabi reach the cup final for the first (and to date only) time, but lost 1–0 to Hakoah Ramat Gan. In the same season they finished second bottom of the league and were relegated back to Liga Alef.

The final match of the 1971–72 season saw the club have a chance to return to the top flight, but they lost 2–1 to Hapoel Marmorek, which were promoted instead. Two years later they qualified for the promotion/relegation play-offs, but failed to win any of their five matches and finished bottom of the group.

At the end of the 1977–78 season they finished bottom of Liga Artzit (the second division) and were relegated to Liga Alef (now the third tier).

At the end of the 1983–84 season they won Liga Alef South division and returned to Liga Artzit, and won a second consecutive promotion in the following season, returning to Liga Leumit for the first time in 16 years. However, they finished bottom, and were relegated back to Liga Artzit.

The club dropped back into the third tier at the end of the 1992–93 season, and were relegated to the fourth tier at the end of the 2000–01 season, before dropping into Liga Bet, the fifth tier, at the end of the 2005–06 season. At the end of the 2011–12 season the club returned to Liga Alef (now the third tier), following a victory of 2–1 against Hapoel Azor in the promotion play-off.

In the 2015–16 season, the club won Liga Alef South division and promoted to Liga Leumit. Thus, the club returned to the second tier of Israeli football after 23 years.

== Current squad ==
As of 13 February 2025

No.	Pos.	Nation	Player
1	GK	(Israel) ISR	Roy Shohat
2	DF	(Israel) ISR	Avraham Masias
3	DF	(Israel) ISR	Eric Khalfin
4	DF	(Israel) ISR	Liam Luzon
6	MF	(Israel) ISR	Adir Fibnik
7	MF	(Israel) ISR	Itay Paz
8	MF	(Israel) ISR	Tasao Wroknach
9	FW	(Israel) ISR	Ben Ozlabo
11	MF	(Israel) ISR	Ido Motro
12	MF	(Israel) ISR	Daniel De Wandelaer
13	MF	(Israel) ISR	Sivan Talmi
14	DF	(Israel) ISR	Elisha Ayalo
16	DF	(Israel) ISR	Ron Yaacob

No.	Pos.	Nation	Player
17	MF	(Israel) ISR	Amit Rozenboim
18	MF	(Israel) ISR	Akalo Makata
20	MF	(Israel) ISR	Elad Shabi
22	GK	(Israel) ISR	Boaz Cohen
23	DF	(Israel) ISR	Yuval Ays
24	DF	(Israel) ISR	Inbar Nidam
55	DF	(Israel) ISR	David Morelly
77	MF	(Israel) ISR	Asher Mashasha
99	FW	(Israel) ISR	Zion Alemayho
—	MF	(Israel) ISR	Maor Asor
—	MF	(Israel) ISR	Ilay Ben Hemo
—	MF	(Israel) ISR	Raz Amir
—	MF	(Israel) ISR	Amir Lavi

== Honours ==
- Third tier
  - Champions: 1955–56, 1959–60, 1983–84, 2015–16
- Fourth tier
  - Champions: 2011–12
- Toto Cup Leumit
  - Winner: 2016–17

== See also ==
- Category:Maccabi Sha'arayim F.C. players
