= Hapoel Beit She'an F.C. =

Israeli football club

Hapoel Beit She'an
- Full name: Hapoel Beit She'an Mesilot Football Club
- Founded: 1953; 2009 as Hapoel Beit She'an Mesilot
- Ground: Municipal Stadium, Beit She'an
- Capacity: 7,000
- Owner: Municipality of Beit She'an
- Chairman: Beber Alkasalsi
- Manager: Guy Dayan
- League: Liga Alef North
- 2024–25: Liga Alef North, 10th of 16
Home colours	Away colours

Hapoel Beit She'an (Hebrew: הפועל בית שאן) is an Israeli football club based in Beit She'an. The club spent several seasons in the top division in the 1990s, but after several relegations, folded in 2006, and was refounded in 2009.

== History ==
The club was founded in 1953, and was renamed Hapoel Beit She'an/Sde Nahum in 1969, as it merged with Hapoel Sde Nahum, which played in Liga Bet, but reverted to their old name two years later. They remained in Liga Bet until 1976 when they were promoted to Liga Alef, and in 1978, to Liga Artzit, then the second tier. The club was relegated back to Liga Alef at the end of the 1983–84 season, but returned to Liga Artzit in 1986. Although they were relegated again, they returned to the second tier in 1993 under the management of Elisha Levy. In 1993–94 they finished second, and were promoted to Liga Leumit (then the top division) for the first time.

Following promotion, the club played its first four home matches in Tiberias whilst their stadium was upgraded. In their first season in Liga Leumit the club survived on the final day of the season, coming from 2–0 down to Maccabi Haifa (who were playing to win the title) to win 3–2. A film was made about the campaign, entitled Underdogs: A War Story.

Levy left the club in 1995 but returned in 1997. On 2 May 1998 the club played Beitar Jerusalem (a match held at Kiryat Eliezer in Haifa on police advice) in a game that became known as the "Shoelaces Match", as Beit She'an were accused of allowing Beitar to win the match (and the title).

After several lower mid-table finishes, Hapoel were relegated at the end of the 1998–99 season. In 2001–02 they finished bottom of the second tier, and were relegated again. A third relegation occurred in 2003–04, this time to Liga Alef. At the end of the 2005–06 season they were relegated from Liga Alef, and folded, although the club's youth teams were still active.

In 2009 the club merged with Hapoel Kvalim Mesilot to form Hapoel Beit She'an Mesilot, which took Mesilot's place in Liga Bet. A year later the team absorbed the local rival Maccabi Beit Shean, which gave up its place in Liga Bet. The club was promoted to Liga Alef after winning Liga Bet North B division.

== Current squad ==
As of 7 September 2024

No.	Pos.	Nation	Player
1	GK	ISR	Ahmed Awwad
3	DF	ISR	Einan Leck
4	DF	ISR	Bassel Taha
6	MF	ISR	Daniel Itzhak
7	MF	ISR	Orel Yehuda
8	MF	ISR	Adam Hilf
9	FW	ISR	Shalom Obanish
10	MF	ISR	Mohammed Saadi
11	MF	ISR	Itzhak Danan
12	DF	ISR	Noel Vitali
14	MF	ISR	Adir Dayan
15	DF	ISR	Harel Ben Baruch

No.	Pos.	Nation	Player
16	MF	ISR	Amir Suan
18	DF	ISR	Shahar Haronian
20	MF	ISR	Avihsay David
21	FW	ISR	Omri Amer
22	GK	ISR	Yair Elazar
29	DF	ISR	Inon Ben Ami
30	DF	LBR	Gizzie Dorbor
33	MF	ISR	Aviv Elimelech
44	DF	ISR	David Danan
55	MF	ISR	Yuval Keinan
70	FW	ISR	Yarin Gabri
99	FW	ISR	Mohammed Abu Ahmed

== Honours ==
=== League ===
Honour	No.	Years
Third tier	3	1973–74, 1975–76, 1985–86
Fourth tier	3	1963–64, 1965–66, 2012–13

=== Cup competitions ===
Honour	No.	Years
Liga Bet North B Division Cup	1	2012–13
