= 1963–64 Israel State Cup =

Football cup competition

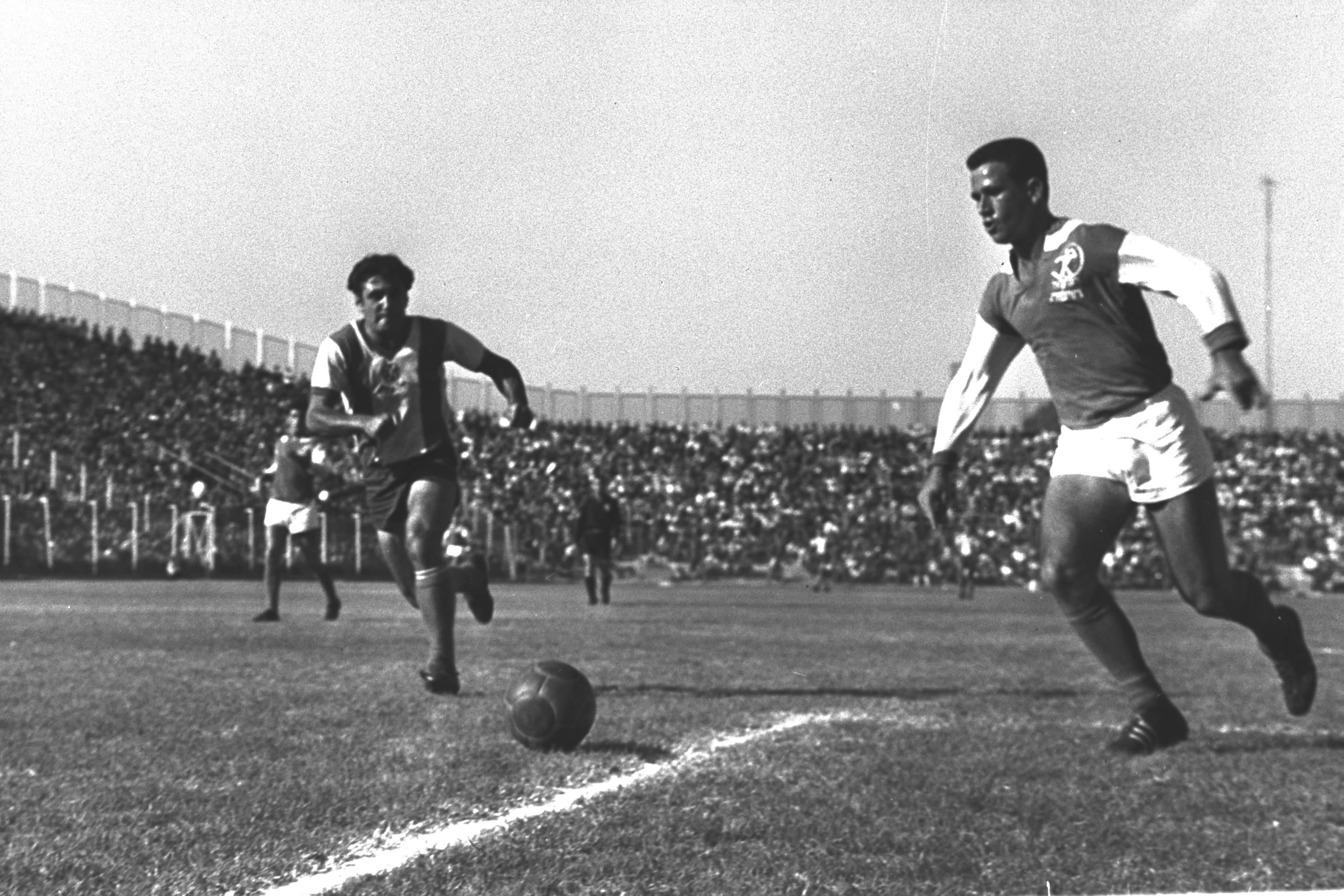

Tournament details
- Country: Israel

Final positions
- Champions: Maccabi Tel Aviv (11th Title)
- Runners-up: Hapoel Haifa

The 1963–64 Israel State Cup (Hebrew: גביע המדינה, Gvia HaMedina) was the 25th season of Israel's nationwide football cup competition and the 10th after the Israeli Declaration of Independence.

For this edition, which began on 21 September 1963, the IFA experimented with the competition's format, holding just one preliminary round, before entering all the teams, including Liga Leumit and Liga Alef teams into the competition in the second round. This move brought high scoring results in matches in which top-tier teams met lower tier opponents, including a record 20–0 result in the match between Hapoel Ramat Gan and Liga Gimel team Beitar Ein Karem.

The final, between Maccabi Tel Aviv and Hapoel Haifa, took two replays to be settled, the first two matches ending with a 1–1 draw. Maccabi Tel Aviv won the third match 2–1 to win its 11th cup. International edición vs Argentine Clubs.

== Results ==
=== First round ===
(Selected results)

The 98 first round matches were played on 21 September 1963. However, for 50 matches a walkover win was given as teams failed to show up or failed to invite a referee for the match.

| Home team | Score | Away team |
|---|---|---|
| Hapoel Neve Eitan | 2–1 | Maccabi Beit She'an |
| Hapoel Atlit | 3–2 | Hapoel Ramat David |
| Beitar Afula | 0–8 | Beitar Binyamina |
| A.S. Kiryat Bialik | 13–0 | Beitar Beit She'an |
| Hapoel Kiryat Tiv'on | 4–3 | Hapoel Yoqneam |
| Hapoel Yagur | 3–2 | Hapoel Ein HaMifratz |
| Hapoel Afula | 2–1 | Beitar Acre |
| Hapoel Avraham Be'er Sheva | 4–1 | Beitar Rehovot |
| Hapoel Afikim | 3–2 | Beitar Tiberias |

=== Second round ===
In addition to the 49 match winners from the first round, all the other league teams, including Liga Leumit and Liga Alef teams entered the competition.

The matches were played on 5 October 1963.

| Home team | Score | Away team |
|---|---|---|
| Hapoel Ramat Gan | 20–0 | Beitar Ein Karem |
| Hapoel Jerusalem | 2–1 | Hapoel Ramla |
| Hapoel Petah Tikva | 17–0 | Maccabi Be'er Sheva |
| Maccabi Petah Tikva | 17–0 | Hapoel Kafr Qasim |
| Bnei Yehuda | 18–0 | Maccabi Kiryat Malakhi |
| Hakoah Tel Aviv | 2–0 | Al Amal Acre |
| Maccabi Shmuel Tel Aviv | 0–3 | Shimshon Tel Aviv |
| Maccabi Sha'arayim | w/o | Maccabi Nesher Tel Hanan |
| Hapoel Tiberias | w/o | Hapoel Mefalsim |
| Hapoel Haifa | 7–1 | Hapoel Eilat |
| Hapoel Tel Aviv | 9–1 | YMCA Jerusalem |
| Hapoel HaSharon HaTzfoni | 1–13 | Maccabi Jaffa |
| Hapoel Lod | 4–2 | Beitar Kiryat Shmona |
| Hapoel Be'er Sheva | 4–2 (a.e.t.) | Beitar Jerusalem |
| Hapoel Rishon LeZion | 1–0 | Hapoel Giv'atayim |
| Hapoel Kfar Saba | 2–2 (a.e.t.); R: 0–3 | Hapoel Hadera |
| Beitar Bat Yam | 5–0 | Hapoel HaTzafon Jerusalem |
| Beitar Tel Aviv | 4–1 | Maccabi Amidar |
| Hapoel Givat Haim | 13–1 | Beitar Kiryat Tiv'on |
| Hapoel Holon | 9–0 | Hapoel Rehovot |
| Maccabi Ramat Gan | 2–1 | Hapoel Be'er Ya'akov |
| Hapoel Ganei Tikva | 9–1 | Hapoel Kiryat Tiv'on |
| Hapoel Yagur | 4–1 | Hapoel Kfar Giladi |
| Hapoel Marmorek | w/o | Hapoel Kadima |
| Beitar Ramla | 1–0 | Hapoel Pardes Hanna |
| Beitar Haifa | 2–1 | Hapoel Afikim |
| Hapoel Kiryat Haim | 7–1 | Hapoel Azor |
| Hapoel Nahliel | 4–2 | Hapoel Kiryat Shmona |
| Beitar Mahane Israel | w/o | Hapoel Neve Eitan |
| Hapoel Mitzpe Ramon | w/o | Hapoel Nir Itzhak |
| Hapoel Avraham Be'er Sheva | w/o | Hapoel Zarnuga |
| Maccabi Tel Aviv | 10–1 | Beitar Mahane Yehuda |

| Home team | Score | Away team |
|---|---|---|
| Beitar Binyamina | w/o | Hapoel Dan |
| Hapoel Shlachim | w/o | Hapoel Bror Hayil |
| Beitar Gedera | w/o | Hapoel Or HaNer |
| Hapoel Kfar Ata | 4–0 | Beitar Tirat HaCarmel |
| Maccabi Fureidis | w/o | Hapoel Darom A Jerusalem |
| Hapoel Netanya | 2–0 | Hapoel HaTzafon Tel Aviv |
| Beitar Netanya | 8–1 | Sektzia Nes Tziona |
| Maccabi Zikhron Ya'akov | 2–3 | Hapoel Shikun HaMizrach |
| Hapoel Herzliya | 3–1 | Hapoel Bnei Nazareth |
| Beitar Harari Tel Aviv | 2–1 | A.S. Kiryat Bialik |
| Hapoel Dorot | 9–0 | Beitar Beit Dagan |
| Beitar Hadera | w/o | Hapoel Kiryat Shalom |
| Maccabi Bat Yam | 2–0 | Hapoel Kedma |
| Hapoel Kfar Blum | 2–1 | Beitar Safed |
| Hapoel Afula | 0–0 (a.e.t.); R: 1–2 (abandoned); R: w/o | Maccabi Pardes Hanna |
| Maccabi Hadera | 7–2 | Hapoel Givat Oz |
| Hapoel Safed | w/o | Hapoel Hulata |
| Hapoel Ya'akov Kfar Saba | w/o | Hapoel Nevatim Safed |
| Hapoel Kiryat Ono | 5–0 | Beitar Dimona |
| Hapoel Tirat HaCarmel | w/o | Hapoel Pardesiya |
| Hapoel Ashkelon | 4–2 | Hapoel Kiryat Malakhi |
| Beitar Kiryat Ono | 1–0 | Hapoel Nehora |
| Maccabi Gan Yavne | 2–3 | Beitar Rishon LeZion |
| Hapoel Ezra | 3–2 | Hapoel Rosh HaAyin |
| Hapoel Sha'ariya | 5–0 | Hapoel Beit Itzhak |
| Maccabi Netanya | 5–1 | Hapoel Nahariya |
| Maccabi Pardesiya | w/o | Hapoel Darom Jerusalem |
| Hapoel Bat Yam | 6–0 | Hapoel Atlit |
| Hapoel Yehud | 2–0 | Hapoel Shefayim |
| Hapoel Acre | 3–2 | Hapoel Shefa-'Amr |
| Hapoel Mahane Yehuda | 11–3 | Hapoel Tel Mond |

=== Third round ===
Most of the matches were played on 4 and 5 February 1964. However, due to weather conditions, some of the matches were played later during February 1964. Two ties took even longer to be settled. Maccabi Jaffa were beaten at home by Hapoel Ashkelon 3–4 (after leading 3–1 at the 85th minute and conceding three goals at the final five minutes), and appealed the result due to Hapoel Ashkelon fielding an ineligible player. Eventually the IFA ordered a replay, played on 17 June 1964, in which Maccabi Jaffa lost once again. A similar appeal in the tie between Hapoel Netanya and Hapoel Haifa, eventually won 2–0 by the former, resulted at first in a walkover win for Hapoel Haifa, and later in a replay, played on 5 September 1964, in which Hapoel Haifa won 6–1.

| Home team | Score | Away team |
|---|---|---|
| Hapoel Netanya | 1–6 | Hapoel Haifa |
| Beitar Netanya | 3–1 | Maccabi Bat Yam |
| Maccabi Netanya | 2–0 | Hapoel Beit Eliezer |
| Hapoel Tiberias | 3–2 | Hapoel Safed |
| Hapoel Be'er Sheva | 5–1 | Hapoel Dimona |
| Hapoel Jerusalem | 6–0 | Hapoel Yehud |
| Beitar Tel Aviv | 6–2 | Hapoel Kfar Yona |
| Hapoel Rishon LeZion | 6–1 | Hapoel Sde Uziyah |
| Beitar Ramla | 4–1 | Maccabi Hadera |
| Hapoel Acre | 2–1 | Hapoel Ya'akov Kfar Saba |
| Hapoel Ashdod | 4–1 | Hapoel Bnei Zion |
| Beitar Be'er Sheva | 6–0 | Hapoel Or HaNer |
| Hapoel Tel Aviv | w/o | Beitar Harari Tel Aviv |
| Maccabi Haifa | 4–4 (a.e.t.) R: 3–2 | Hapoel Kfar Blum |
| Hapoel Marmorek | 2–5 | Maccabi Petah Tikva |
| Maccabi Jaffa | 2–3 | Hapoel Ashkelon |
| Beitar Bat Yam | 0–8 | Bnei Yehuda |
| Maccabi Ramat Gan | 2–5 | Shimshon Tel Aviv |

| Home team | Score | Away team |
|---|---|---|
| Hapoel Petah Tikva | 10–0 | Maccabi Herzliya |
| Hapoel Lod | 6–1 | Beitar Kiryat Ono |
| Maccabi Tel Aviv | 4–0 | Hapoel Kiryat Ono |
| Maccabi Sha'arayim | 2–0 | Hapoel Bat Yam |
| Hapoel Ramat Gan | 4–0 | Hapoel Givat Haim |
| Hapoel Holon | 5–0 | Hapoel Dorot |
| Hapoel Herzliya | w/o | Beitar Binyamina |
| Beitar Haifa | 1–0 (a.e.t.) | Hapoel Tirat HaCarmel |
| Hapoel Ezra | 0–3 | Hapoel Kfar Shalem |
| Hapoel Shlachim | w/o | Hapoel Ofakim |
| Hapoel Yagur | w/o | Maccabi Fureidis |
| Beitar Rishon LeZion | w/o | Beitar Gedera |
| Hakoah Tel Aviv | 4–1 | Hapoel Sha'ariya |
| Hapoel Mahane Yehuda | 10–1 | Beitar Ashdod |
| Hapoel Hadera | 6–1 | Hapoel Ganei Tikva |
| Hapoel Kiryat Haim | 11–1 | Beitar Hadera |
| Beitar Kfar Ekron | 5–2 | Maccabi Kfar Ekron |
| Hapoel Mitzpe Ramon | | Hapoel Avraham Be'er Sheva |
| Hapoel Nahliel | | Hapoel Karkur |
| Maccabi Pardes Hanna | 1–2 | Hapoel Shikun HaMizrach |

=== Fourth round ===
Following the third round, an intermediate round had to be played in order to bring the number of contestants to 32. 14 of the third round winners were drawn to play, while the other teams received a bye to the fifth round. Matches in this round were all played on 18 February 1964.

| Home team | Score | Away team |
|---|---|---|
| Hapoel Ramat Gan | 5–2 | Hapoel Rishon LeZion |
| Beitar Rishon LeZion | 10–1 | Beitar Kfar Ekron |
| Hapoel Acre | 2–2 (a.e.t.); R: 3–0 | Beitar Haifa |
| Hapoel Nahliel | 2–0 | Hapoel Yagur |
| Hapoel Be'er Sheva | 3–1 | Beitar Be'er Sheva |
| Hapoel Avraham Be'er Sheva | 2–1 | Hapoel Ofakim |
| Hapoel Ashdod | w/o | M.S. Even Yehuda |

=== Fifth round ===
| 12 September 1964 | Hapoel Mahane Yehuda | 2–0 | Hapoel Petah Tikva | Hapoel Petah Tikva Stadium |
| | Ratzon 51'; Ratzabi 64' | | | Attendance: 5000; Referee: Dudai |

| 12 September 1964 | Beitar Tel Aviv | 5–2 | Hapoel Kfar Shalem |
| | Bonezzi 10'; Kalendaroff 21'; Bustamente 34'; Portugues 40', 49' | | Hanun 33'; Mushon 41' |

| 12 September 1964 | Hapoel Ashdod | 0–6 | Hapoel Ramat Gan |
| | | | Sasson 14', 57'; Nahmias 18'; S. Levi 32', 82'; Perl 76' |

| 12 September 1964 | Maccabi Petah Tikva | 4–3 | Bnei Yehuda |
| | Seltzer 23', 60'; Rosenzweig 37'; Peled 42' | | Mager 32', 47'; Tessa 76' |

| 12 September 1964 | Shimshon Tel Aviv | 1–0 | Hapoel Hadera |
| | Betzalel 34' | | | Attendance: 2500; Referee: Ashkenazi |

| 12 September 1964 | Hapoel Kiryat Haim | 4–1 | Hapoel Shikun HaMizrach | Kiryat Haim Stadium |
| | Gruber 32'; Eliaski 42'; Sha'ama 57', 87' | | Kedushin 51' |

| 12 September 1964 | Hapoel Tiberias | 2–3 (a.e.t.) | Hapoel Haifa |
| | Fadal 72', 75' | | Orbach 16'; Englander 50'; V. Young 98' | Attendance: 1500; Referee: Hoze |

| 12 September 1964 | Hapoel Tel Aviv | 3–0 | Hapoel Be'er Sheva | Bloomfield Stadium |
| | Nurieli 2'; Fridrich 10'; Danieli 49' | | | Attendance: 5000; Referee: Eitan |

| 12 September 1964 | Maccabi Tel Aviv | 4–0 | Hapoel Jerusalem | Maccabiah Stadium |
| | Bachar 8'; Asis 33', 52'; Kedmi 58' | | | Attendance: 2500; Referee: Klein |

| 12 September 1964 | Maccabi Haifa | 2–1 | Hakoah Tel Aviv | Haifa Municipal Stadium |
| | Shmulevich 17'; Hirsch 83' | | Shaharbani 22' | Attendance: 5000; Referee: Fried |

| 12 September 1964 | Beitar Ramla | 3–1 (a.e.t.) | Hapoel Ashkelon |
| | Zakuto 4', 100'; Amar 95' | | Boukhobza 10' (pen.) |

| 12 September 1964 | Hapoel Acre | 3–1 | Beitar Netanya |
| | Rishti 10', 11'; Harush 21' | | Hajaj 82' |

| 12 September 1964 | Beitar Rishon LeZion | w/o | Hapoel Nahliel |

| 12 September 1964 | Maccabi Netanya | 5–1 | Hapoel Avraham Be'er Sheva | Maccabi Netanya Stadium |
| | Heine 8'; Spiegler 37', 50' (pen.), 63'; Heski 52' | | Migdali 76' | Attendance: 2000; Referee: Halperin |

| 12 September 1964 | Maccabi Sha'arayim | 1–1 | Hapoel Holon |
| | Mizrachi 76' | | Klein 54' | Attendance: 500; Referee: Maimon |

| 12 September 1964 | Hapoel Herzliya | 5–2 | Hapoel Lod | Hapoel Herzliya Ground |
| | Refael 31', 70'; Ginzburg 35'; Fuchs 72' | | Nankin 24'; Bardugo 44' | Attendance: 1000; Referee: Prohaski |

==== Replay ====
| Hapoel Holon | 0–2 | Maccabi Sha'arayim | Hapoel Holon Ground |
| | | Bzozak 24' (pen.); E. Levi 30' | Attendance: 1000; Referee: Ashkenazi |

=== Sixth round ===
| 19 September 1964 | Hapoel Mahane Yehuda | 3–0 | Maccabi Petah Tikva | Hapoel Petah Tikva Stadium |
| | Ratzabi 23', 71'; Ratzon 47' |

| 19 September 1964 | Beitar Tel Aviv | 3–0 | Beitar Ramla |
| | Alaluf 33'; Portugues 34'; Bustamente 43' |

| 19 September 1964 | Hapoel Kiryat Haim | w/o | Hapoel Ramat Gan | Kiryat Haim Stadium |
| | Lichinski 52' | | | Attendance: 8000 |

| 19 September 1964 | Hapoel Nahliel | 2–1 | Hapoel Herzliya | Hapoel Hadera Ground |
| | Szydlowski 5'; Y. Sharabi 65' | | Refael 80' | Attendance: 1000; Referee: Admoni |

| 19 September 1964 | Shimshon Tel Aviv | 0–4 | Hapoel Haifa | Bloomfield Stadium |
| | | | V. Young 28', 29', 52'; Englander 55' | Attendance: 8000; Referee: Shoshani |

| 19 September 1964 | Maccabi Netanya | 3–1 | Maccabi Sha'arayim | Maccabi Netanya Stadium |
| | Heine 12', 30'; Spiegler 52' (pen.) | | A. Sharabi 49' | Attendance: 3500; Referee: Dudai |

| 19 September 1964 | w/o | Maccabi Haifa |

| 19 September 1964 | Hapoel Tel Aviv | 0–4 | Maccabi Tel Aviv | Bloomfield Stadium |
| | | | Ben Baruch 38' (o.g.); Spiegel 55'; Talbi 75'; Kedmi 83' | Attendance: 13000; Referee: Ashkenazi |

=== Quarter-finals ===
22 September 1964

| Hapoel Nahliel | 0–2 | Maccabi Tel Aviv |
|---|---|---|
| | | Perahia 5'; Talbi 18' |

Hapoel Hadera Ground, Hadera
Attendance: 3000
Referee: Handwerk
22 September 1964

| Beitar Tel Aviv | 2–6 | Maccabi Haifa |
|---|---|---|
| Portugues 48', 77' | | Zvi 8', 75'; Hirsch 14', 78'; Almani 24'; Shmulevich 57' |

Bloomfield Stadium, Tel Aviv
Attendance: 4000
Referee: Ashkenazi
22 September 1964

| Hapoel Haifa | 3–1 | Hapoel Mahane Yehuda |
|---|---|---|
| Englander 7', 30', 78' | | Aharoni 18' |

Haifa Municipal Stadium, Haifa
Attendance: 7000
Referee: Friesner
22 September 1964

| Hapoel Ramat Gan | 0–1 | Maccabi Netanya |
|---|---|---|
| | | Heine 85' |

HaMakhtesh Stadium
Attendance: 2500

=== Semi-finals ===
26 September 1964

| Maccabi Tel Aviv | 3–1 | Maccabi Haifa |
|---|---|---|
| Kedmi 12', 27'; Shikva 64' | | Gershgoren 2' |

Bloomfield Stadium, Tel Aviv
Attendance: 20000
Referee: Dudai

26 September 1964

| Hapoel Haifa | 3–2 | Maccabi Netanya |
|---|---|---|
| Piker 23' (pen.); V. Young 38'; R. Young 58' | | Moisesko 2'; Spiegler 69' (pen.) |

Bloomfield Stadium, Tel Aviv
Attendance: 20000
Referee: Fried

=== Final ===
30 September 1964

| Maccabi Tel Aviv | 1–1 (a.e.t.) | Hapoel Haifa |
|---|---|---|
| Shikva 82' | | R. Young 86' |

Bloomfield Stadium, Tel Aviv
Attendance: 20000
Referee: Ashkenazi

==== Replay ====
10 November 1964

| Maccabi Tel Aviv | 1–1 (a.e.t.) | Hapoel Haifa |
|---|---|---|
| Shikva 102' | | V. Young 108' |

Bloomfield Stadium, Tel Aviv
Attendance: 12000
Referee: Ashkenazi

==== Second Replay ====
8 December 1964

| Hapoel Haifa | 1–2 | Maccabi Tel Aviv |
|---|---|---|
| Englander 53' | | Asis 73'; Kedmi 87' |

Kiryat Haim Stadium, Haifa
Attendance: 14000
Referee: Mizrachi
