= 1964–65 Israel State Cup =

Tournament details
- Country: Israel

Final positions
- Champions: Maccabi Tel Aviv (12th Title)
- Runners-up: Bnei Yehuda

The 1964–65 Israel State Cup (Hebrew: גביע המדינה, Gvia HaMedina) was the 26th season of Israel's nationwide football cup competition and the 11th after the Israeli Declaration of Independence.

The competition began on 7 November 1964, with first round matches, involving Liga Bet and Liga Gimel teams. For the first time since 1951–52, the competition was played throughout the duration of a single season, with the final between Maccabi Tel Aviv and Bnei Yehuda being played on 29 June 1965. Maccabi won the match in extra time by a single goal and earned its second consecutive cup and 12th overall.

== Results ==
=== Third Round ===
The 64 second round winners were joined in this round by the teams from Liga Alef. Matches were played on 12 December 1964.

Home team	Score	Away team
Hapoel Kfar Blum	1–0	Hapoel Nahariya
Hapoel Givat Olga	1–2	Hapoel Hatzor
Maccabi Rosh Pina	1–5	Hapoel Afula
Hapoel Kiryat Haim	6–0	Hapoel Kafr Sulam
Maccabi Kfar Ata	w/o	Hapoel Shefayim
Beitar Vatikim Netanya	3–3 (a.e.t.); R: 0–1	Hapoel Rishon LeZion
Hapoel Acre	6–0	Beitar Dimona
Hapoel Kfar Yeruham	w/o	Hapoel Bavli Tel Aviv
Hapoel Kfar Yona	5–2	Maccabi Kiryat Gat
Hapoel Kiryat Gat	1–2	Hapoel Kfar Saba
Hapoel Hadera	4–1	Hapoel Ra'anana
Hapoel Kiryat Malakhi	1–2	Hapoel HaSharon HaTzfoni
Hapoel Nahliel	2–0	Maccabi Zikhron Ya'akov
Hapoel Tel Mond	7–1	Maccabi Ramla
Beitar Netanya	1–0	Maccabi Herzliya
Hapoel Sde Uziyah	w/o	Beitar Ramat Gan
Beitar Nahariya	w/o	Beitar Mahane Yehuda
Hapoel Dora	w/o	Moadon HaPiryon Shefa-'Amr
Hapoel Kfar Ata	0–1	M.S. Even Yehuda
Hapoel Balfouria	w/o	Hapoel Or Akiva
Hapoel Kfar Shalem	3–3 (a.e.t.); R: w/o	Maccabi Hadera
Hapoel Afikim	3–2 (a.e.t.)	Beitar Haifa
Hapoel Kiryat Shmona	w/o	Maccabi Ramat Gan
Hapoel Be'er Sheva	4–0	Hapoel Lod

Home team	Score	Away team
Hapoel Bat Yam	5–2	Hapoel Kiryat Nazareth
Hapoel Shikun HaMizrach	2–0	A.S. David Tel Aviv
Hapoel Holon	2–3	Beitar Jerusalem
Maccabi Bat Yam	2–0	Hapoel Nof Yam
Maccabi Kfar Ekron	3–1	Beitar Harari Tel Aviv
Maccabi Aviv	1–6	Hapoel Ashkelon
Ahva Ramla	2–4	Hapoel Marmorek
Hapoel Beit Itzhak	4–1	Hapoel Ofakim
Hapoel Giv'atayim	4–1 (a.e.t.)	Hapoel Kiryat Ono
ASA Jerusalem	4–5 (a.e.t.)	Maccabi Kiryat Yam
Maccabi Ramat Amidar	w/o	Beitar Kiryat Shmona
Maccabi Shmuel Tel Aviv	w/o	Hapoel Binyamina
Beitar Ramla	5–0	Sektzia Nes Tziona
Hapoel Mahane Yehuda	8–0	Hapoel Safed
Maccabi Holon	4–0	Hapoel Ramat David
Hapoel HaTzafon Tel Aviv	4–4 (a.e.t.); R: w/o	Maccabi Neve Shalom
Hapoel Be'er Ya'akov	w/o	Beitar Be'er Sheva
Beitar Beit Dagan	w/o	Hapoel Bnei Nazareth
Beitar Lod	7–3 (a.e.t.)	Hapoel Yehud
Hapoel Sderot	4–2	Hapoel Zafon Jerusalem
HaBira Jerusalem	0–0 (a.e.t.); R: w/o	Hapoel Sha'ariya
Hapoel Netanya	2–1	Hapoel Ramla
Hapoel Herzliya	1–0	Hapoel Beit Eliezer
Hapoel Eilat	w/o	Beitar Safed

=== Fourth Round ===
23 January 1965	Hapoel Haifa	1–0	Hapoel Kfar Blum	Kiryat Haim Stadium
	Englander 33'			Attendance: 2000; Referee: A. Cohen

23 January 1965	Hapoel Hadera	1–1	Hapoel Ramat Gan	Hapoel Hadera Ground
	Skloot 30'		S. Levi 39'	Attendance: 4000; Referee: Singer

23 January 1965	Hapoel Tiberias	2–1	Hapoel Herzliya	Tiberias Municipal Stadium
	Fadal 3'; Mizrachi 75'		Fuchs 43'	Attendance: 1500; Referee: H. Cohen

23 January 1965	M.S. Even Yehuda	2–4	Hapoel Petah Tikva	Petah Tikva
	Messing 38' (pen.); Halfon 44'		Peterburg 15' (pen.); Z. Sharabi 20'; A. Ratzabi 22', 53'	Attendance: 2000

23 January 1965	Hapoel Kfar Saba	1–2	Hapoel Jerusalem
	Vidra 41'		Lichinski 48'; Singel 80'	Attendance: 2000; Referee: Ron

23 January 1965	Hapoel Acre	2–0	Maccabi Haifa	Hapoel Acre Ground
	Sayag 19'; Rishti 86'			Attendance: 5000; Referee: Gilad

23 January 1965	Hapoel Tel Aviv	2–2	Beitar Netanya	Bloomfield Stadium, Tel Aviv
	Bursuk 29', 65'		Sabo 10'; Levkovich 36' (o.g.)	Attendance: 10000; Referee: Gaon

23 January 1965	Maccabi Jaffa	8–0	Beitar Ramat Gan	Bloomfield Stadium, Tel Aviv
	Pyttel 22', 24', 62'; Goldberg 41', 76', 87'; Sefadia 54', 59' (pen.)			Attendance: 4000; Referee: Admoni

23 January 1965	Hapoel HaSharon HaTzfoni	1–0	Hapoel Nahliel	Hapoel Hadera Ground
	Elmaliah 83'			Referee: Efron

23 January 1965	Maccabi Tel Aviv	11–0	Hapoel Tel Mond
	Spiegel 5', 23', 46', 50' (pen.); Shikva 37', 60', 73'; Asis 44'; Metanya 90'			Referee: Prohaski

23 January 1965	Maccabi Petah Tikva	2–0	Beitar Nahariya
	Konstelich 69'; Begbleiter 74'			Attendance: 1000; Referee: Nahmias

23 January 1965	Maccabi Sha'arayim	3–1 (a.e.t.)	Hapoel Dora	Hapoel Rehovot Ground
	Ya'ish 16' (o.g.); Mansur 107' (pen.); A. Sharabi 112'		D. Cohen 40'	Attendance: 500; Referee: Funt

23 January 1965	Hapoel Kfar Yona	1–0	Hapoel Kfar Yeruham
	Ze'evi 87'

23 January 1965	Hapoel Hatzor	3–1	Hapoel Or Akiva
	Lazmi 43'; Cohen 61'; Yihyah 61'		Suissa 25'

23 January 1965	Hapoel Kiryat Haim	0–1	Shimshon Tel Aviv	Kiryat Haim Stadium
			S. Cohen 22'	Attendance: 3000; Referee: Klein

23 January 1965	Hapoel Rishon Lezion	1–2	Hapoel Afula
	Becker 67'		Gavriel 20'; Bar-David 50'

23 January 1965	Beitar Lod	1–2	Hapoel Marmorek
	Tayeb 89' (pen.)		M. Sharabi 11'; Sternfeld 13'

23 January 1965	Hapoel Sderot	0–3	Hapoel Mahane Yehuda
			Ratzon 10', 20', 87'	Attendance: 1000; Referee: Orabi

23 January 1965	Hapoel Shefayim	3–2	HaBira Jerusalem
	Vazarin 2'; Ninio 29'; Basis 60'		Mabshuf 66'; Anton 80'	Attendance: 400; Referee: Rubin

23 January 1965	Beitar Ramla	4–2	Hapoel Be'er Ya'akov
	Sammy 53'; Zakuto 71'; Edri 77'; Ben-Ami 78' (pen.)		Buchnik 26'; Dvash 33'	Referee: Rabinovich

23 January 1965	Maccabi Kiryat Yam	3–5 (a.e.t.)	Hapoel Be'er Sheva

23 January 1965	Maccabi Ramat Amidar	w/o	Hapoel Eilat

23 January 1965	Maccabi Netanya	3–2	Maccabi Hadera	Maccabi Netanya Stadium
	Heski 46'; Spiegler 49'; Fengel 80'		Reznik 21'; Rosenbaum 70'	Attendance: 2000; Referee: Refael Arye

23 January 1965	Hapoel Afikim	4–1	Hapoel Kiryat Shmona
	Rosen 30'; Kitzi 60'; Karf 80'; Menchel 83'		Moyal 10'

23 January 1965	Hapoel Ashkelon	2–0	Hapoel Bat Yam

23 January 1965	Hapoel Beit Itzhak	3–4	Beitar Tel Aviv	Hapoel Ra'anana Ground
	D. Sternfeld 36', 46', 50'		Kalendaroff 16', 20', 38'; Goldstein 65'	Attendance: 100; Referee: Zamir

23 January 1965	Maccabi Shmuel Tel Aviv	1–2	Hapoel Netanya
	Misha'el 44' (pen.)		Nussbaum 2', 33'

23 January 1965	Maccabi Holon	1–0	Hapoel Giv'atayim

23 January 1965	Hapoel HaTzafon Tel Aviv	2–0	Hapoel Shikun HaMizrach
	Tzadok 25'; Balulu 71'

23 January 1965	Hakoah Maccabi Ramat Gan	4–1	Maccabi Bat Yam	Galei Gil Stadium
	Tzelniker 20', 50', 90'; Shaharbani 32' (pen.)		Kapitolnik 88' (o.g.)	Attendance: 2000; Referee: Smadar

23 January 1965	Hapoel Bnei Nazareth	3–4 (a.e.t.)	Beitar Jerusalem
	Farhoud 42', 51'; Shama 55'		Avitan 47', 49', 84'; Aminoff 100'

23 January 1965	Maccabi Kfar Ekron	0–10	Bnei Yehuda	Hapoel Rehovot Ground
			Tessa 5', 42', 70'; Mizrachi 10', 39', 85'; Ozeri 11' (pen.); Mehalel 24' ? 52' (o.g.); Shasho 89' (pen.)	Attendance: 500; Referee: Levi

==== Replays ====
2 February 1965	Hapoel Ramat Gan	w/o (Note: Upon arrival to the stadium, Hapoel Hadera players were stopped by the Hapoel Ramat Gan ushers, and some were beaten by the ushers. Eventually, the Hapoel Hadera players were allowed into the ground, however, the incident caused them to field the team 25 minutes late, by which time the referee cancelled the match. Upon appeal the match was given to Hapoel Hadera.)	Hapoel Hadera	HaMakhtesh Stadium
				Referee: Handwerk

23 January 1965	Hapoel Tel Aviv	2–1	Beitar Netanya	Bloomfield Stadium, Tel Aviv (Note: The match was moved from Netanya to Bloomfield Stadium in exchange to IL3,000.)
	Nurieli 16', 38'		Sabo 80'	Attendance: 2000; Referee: Nudelman

=== Fifth Round ===
13 February 1965	Maccabi Sha'arayim	2–1	Hapoel Acre	Hapoel Rehovot Ground
	Bzozak 38'; Levi 60'		Rishti 5'	Attendance: 2000; Referee: Barabash

13 February 1965	Hapoel Ashkelon	1–0 (a.e.t.)	Hapoel Afula
	Amar 91'

13 February 1965	Hapoel Be'er Sheva	4–2	Maccabi Ramat Amidar
	H. Cohen 38', 90'; Admon 52'; S. Levi 85'		Terry 44', 61'	Referee: Finkelstein

13 February 1965	Hapoel Afikim	3–2 (a.e.t.)	Hapoel Shefayim
	Rosen 50', 93'; Dubovski 73'		Cohen 15', 68'

13 February 1965	Hapoel Hatzor	2–0	Hapoel HaSharon HaTzfoni
	V. Levi 20', 60'

13 February 1965	Beitar Jerusalem	0–0 (a.e.t.)	Hapoel Jerusalem	Hapoel Jerusalem Ground
				Attendance: 9000; Referee: Friesner

13 February 1965	Maccabi Petah Tikva	1–0	Hapoel HaTzafon Tel Aviv	Hapoel Petah Tikva Ground
	Aharonov 9'			Attendance: 1000; Referee: Avraham Cohen

13 February 1965	Hapoel Netanya	0–0 (a.e.t.)	Shimshon Tel Aviv

13 February 1965	Hapoel Tel Aviv	1–0	Beitar Tel Aviv	Bloomfield Stadium, Tel Aviv
	Hazum 47'			Attendance: 13000; Referee: Ashkenazi

13 February 1965	Hapoel Marmorek	1–3	Maccabi Tel Aviv	Hapoel Rehovot Ground
	Helef 60'		Asis 2'; Spiegel 15'; Talbi 22'	Attendance: 2500; Referee: Prohaski

13 February 1965	Maccabi Jaffa	1–0	Hapoel Mahane Yehuda	Bloomfield Stadium, Tel Aviv
	Pyttel 65'			Attendance: 7000; Referee: Eitan

13 February 1965	Hapoel Petah Tikva	3–2	Maccabi Holon
	Stelmach 21'; H. Bachar 75'; Peterburg 82' (pen.)		Kroytero 11'; Ta'izi 56'	Referee: Astelush

13 February 1965	Hakoah Maccabi Ramat Gan	8–0	Hapoel Kfar Yona	Galei Gil Stadium
	Shaharbani 10'; Tzelinker 12', 62', 68'; Kadosh 32' (pen.); Shauli 40', 80'			Attendance: 500; Referee: Gerstner

13 February 1965	Maccabi Netanya	5–0	Beitar Ramla	Maccabi Netanya Stadium
	Spiegler 5', 35'; Bar 20', 85'; Sarusi 87'			Attendance: 4000; Referee: Shapira

13 February 1965	Bnei Yehuda	2–1	Hapoel Hadera	Hapoel Holon Ground
	Grundman 9'; A. Sharabi 85'		Balnero 47'	Attendance: 0 Referee: Danenberg

13 February 1965	Hapoel Haifa	2–1 abandoned '62 (Note: After Hapoel Haifa scored its second goal, Hapoel Tiberias players Ya'ish and Fadal protested the goal and were sent off. As both refused to leave the field, the match was abandoned.)	Hapoel Tiberias	Hapoel Herzliya Ground
	Cubic 2'; Laufer 56'		Ya'ish 45'	Referee: Hoze

==== Replays ====
23 February 1965	Hapoel Jerusalem	1–1 (a.e.t.) (Note: After both matches ended in a draw, the winner was decided by drawing of lots which was held on 5 March 1965.)	Beitar Jerusalem	Hapoel Jerusalem Ground
	Ben Rimoz 42'		Geller 55'	Attendance: 6000; Referee: Ashkenazi

2 March 1965	Shimshon Tel Aviv	1–3	Hapoel Netanya	Bloomfield Stadium, Tel Aviv
	S. Cohen 81'		Gueta 73'; Nussbaum 82', 90'	Attendance: 3000; Referee: Shapira

=== Sixth Round ===
14 March 1965	Maccabi Tel Aviv	3–2 (a.e.t.)	Hapoel Petah Tikva
	Asis 18'; Shikva 57'; Karako 100'		Kaufmann 28' (pen.); Sharabi 73'	Attendance: 15000; Referee: Dudai

14 March 1965	Maccabi Jaffa	1–2	Hapoel Tel Aviv	Bloomfield Stadium, Tel Aviv
	Ashkenazi 14'		Nimni 61' (o.g.); Friedrich 79'	Attendance: 17000; Referee: Eitan

14 March 1965	Maccabi Petah Tikva	4–1	Hakoah Maccabi Ramat Gan	Hapoel Petah Tikva ground
	Becker 11', 71'; Rosenzweig 21'; Peled 83'		Sherer 67'	Attendance: 3500; Referee: Mizrachi

14 March 1965	Bnei Yehuda	2–1	Hapoel Jerusalem	HaMakhtesh Stadium
	Tessa 6'; Mizrachi 75'		Singel 30'	Attendance: 500; Referee: Hoze

14 March 1965	Hapoel Be'er Sheva	2–1 (a.e.t.)	Hapoel Haifa	Vasermil Stadium
	Admon 19'; Matan 113'		Urbach 13'	Attendance: 6000; Referee: Fried

14 March 1965	Maccabi Sha'arayim	2–0 (a.e.t.)	Hapoel Hatzor	Hapoel Rehovot Ground
	Hershkovitz 92'; Mizrachi 95'			Attendance: 600; Referee: Atali

14 March 1965	Hapoel Afikim	2–0	Hapoel Ashkelon	Hapoel Afikim ground
	Rosen 23'; Hershkovitz 29' (pen.)			Attendance: 1500; Referee: Laufer

14 March 1965	Hapoel Netanya	0–9	Maccabi Netanya	Maccabi Netanya ground
			Heine 20'; Spiegler 31', 63', 67'; Heski 46'; Sarusi 75', 76', 84'; Probak 88' (o.g.)	Attendance: 4000; Referee: Mizrachi

=== Quarter-finals ===
6 April 1965

Maccabi Tel Aviv	2–0	Maccabi Netanya
Spiegel 42', 89' (pen.)

Attendance: 5000
Referee: Dudai

6 April 1965

Maccabi Petah Tikva	1–0	Hapoel Afikim
Aharonov 60'

Hapoel Petah Tikva ground
Attendance: 2000
Referee: Gerstner

6 April 1965

Hapoel Tel Aviv	4–2 (a.e.t.)	Hapoel Be'er Sheva
Bursuk 24', 100'; Hazum 54', 115'		Offer 52'; Cohen 65'

Bloomfield Stadium, Tel Aviv
Attendance: 150
Referee: Singer

6 April 1965

Maccabi Sha'arayim	1–1	Bnei Yehuda
Mizrachi 80'		S. Cohen 60'

Hapoel Rehovot Ground
Attendance: 1500
Referee: Uziel

==== Replay ====
6 April 1965

Bnei Yehuda	1–0	Maccabi Sha'arayim
Tessa 2'

Bloomfield Stadium, Tel Aviv
Attendance: 5000
Referee: Dudai

=== Semi-finals ===
1 June 1965

Maccabi Tel Aviv	3–1	Maccabi Petah Tikva
Talbi 75', 85'; Shikva 89'		Ben-Bassat 25'

Bloomfield Stadium, Tel Aviv
Attendance: 9000
Referee: Mizrachi

1 May 1965

Hapoel Tel Aviv	0–2	Bnei Yehuda
		Grundman 31'; Tessa 69'

Bloomfield Stadium, Tel Aviv
Attendance: 10000
Referee: Ashkenazi

=== Final ===
29 June 1965

Maccabi Tel Aviv	2–1 (a.e.t.)	Bnei Yehuda
Asis 24'; Baranes 112'		Tessa 39'

Bloomfield Stadium, Tel Aviv
Attendance: 20000
Referee: Klein
