= 1965–66 Israel State Cup =

Tournament details
- Country: Israel

Final positions
- Champions: Hapoel Haifa (2nd Title)
- Runners-up: Shimshon Tel Aviv

The 1965–66 Israel State Cup (Hebrew: גביע המדינה, Gvia HaMedina) was the 27th season of Israel's nationwide football cup competition and the 12th after the Israeli Declaration of Independence.

A rule change was instituted this season, so that in the event of a tie at the end of 90 minutes and extra time, there will be a penalty shoot-out, instead of a replay. The first two penalty shoot-outs of the competition occurred on the first round, played on 18 September 1965, with Hapoel Shefayim besting Hapoel Givat Haim 4–3, and with Hapoel Sha'ar HaNegev winning over Hapoel Ramat David with the same result.

The quarter-finals, semi-finals and the final itself were all played within one week, between 1 June 1966 and 8 June 1966. Hapoel Haifa and Shimshon Tel Aviv met at the final, the former winning 2–1 to claim its second cup.

== Results ==
=== Fourth Round ===
The 32 second round winners were joined in this round by the teams from Liga Alef. Matches were played on 29 January 1966

Home team	Score	Away team
Hapoel Shefayim	3–2	Hapoel Herzliya
Hapoel Ashdod	2–1	Beitar Kiryat Ono
Hapoel Ganei Tikva	3–1	Hapoel Lod
Hapoel Netanya	2–2 (a.e.t.); 6–5 p.	Maccabi Hadera
Beitar Haifa	6–0	Hapoel Kiryat Yam
Hapoel Or Yehuda	2–2 (a.e.t.); 2–1 p.	Hapoel Ezra
Maccabi Haifa	2–1	M.S. Even Yehuda
Hapoel Nahliel	4–1	Hapoel Kfar Blum
Hapoel Kiryat Haim	4–2	Hapoel Safed
Beitar Jerusalem	2–0	Hapoel Marmorek
Hapoel Kiryat Ono	3–2	HaBira Jerusalem
Hapoel Kiryat Shmona	2–0	Beitar Netanya
Hapoel Holon	2–0	Hapoel Giv'atayim
Hapoel Tel Mond	7–1	Maccabi Ramla
Beitar Lod	11–0	Hapoel Sde Uziyah
Hapoel Tiberias	11–1	Moadon HaPiryon Shefa-'Amr

Home team	Score	Away team
Hapoel Kfar Saba	5–0	Hapoel Tira
Hapoel Bnei Nazareth	3–1	Maccabi Herzliya
Beitar Ramla	8–1	Hapoel Katamonim
Maccabi Ramat Amidar	3–0	Beitar Rishon LeZion
Hapoel Ashkelon	4–2	Hapoel Yehud
Hapoel Hadera	1–1 (a.e.t.); 4–5 p.	Hapoel Acre
Maccabi Holon	1–0	Hapoel Ramat HaSharon
Hapoel Rishon LeZion	3–2	Hapoel Kir'on
Sektzia Nes Tziona	2–1	Hapoel Sha'ar HaNegev
Hapoel Dora	5–1	Hapoel Dan
Beitar Be'er Sheva	3–1	Hapoel Bavli Tel Aviv
Hapoel Ra'anana	7–1	A.S. David Tel Aviv
Hapoel Tel Hanan	5–1	Beitar Beit She'an
Hapoel Migdal HaEmek	2–0	Hapoel Hatzor
A.S. Elite Ramat Gan	5–2	Beitar Kiryat Tiv'on
Hapoel Bat Yam	4–0	Maccabi Bnei Tira
Hapoel Kfar Shalem	1–0	Beitar Rehovot

=== Fifth Round ===
Home team	Score	Away team
Hapoel Nahliel	3–2	Hapoel Kfar Saba
Sektzia Nes Tziona	2–3	Beitar Jerusalem
Maccabi Haifa	5–3	Maccabi Ramat Amidar
Hapoel Ra'anana	2–1	Hapoel Acre
A.S. Elite Ramat Gan	2–0	Hapoel Bnei Nazareth
Hapoel Ashkelon	6–1	Hapoel Dora
Hapoel Tiberias	4–1	Beitar Lod
Hapoel Netanya	3–2	Beitar Ramla
Hapoel Holon	3–0	Maccabi Holon
Hapoel Rishon LeZion	3–1	Hapoel Kfar Shalem
Hapoel Kiryat Shmona	1–0	Beitar Haifa
Hapoel Kiryat Ono	1–0	Hapoel Ganei Tikva
Hapoel Kiryat Haim	4–1	Hapoel Shefayim
Hapoel Ashdod	2–1	Hapoel Bat Yam
Hapoel Migdal HaEmek	3–1	Hapoel Tel Hanan
Beitar Be'er Sheva	1–0	Hapoel Or Yehuda

=== Sixth Round ===
22 March 1966	Hapoel Migdal HaEmek	0–3	Maccabi Sha'arayim
			Shaubi ?' (pen.); A. Levi ?'; Harbaji ?'	Referee: Ben-Simon

22 March 1966	Hapoel Ashkelon	3–0 (a.e.t.)	Beitar Tel Aviv	Ashkelon Municipal Stadium
	Bukovza 32' (pen.); Amar 71', 81'			Attendance: 1000; Referee: Eitan

22 March 1966	Hapoel Ramat Gan	4–1	Hapoel Be'er Sheva	HaMakhtesh Stadium
	Nahmias 9', 25'; Haiman 13'; R. Cohen 48'		Tzarfati 41'	Referee: Zohar

22 March 1966	Hapoel Mahane Yehuda	5–0	A.S. Elite Ramat Gan
	I. Ratzabi 57', 61'; Ratzon 64'; Aharoni 73'; Z. Ratzabi 88'			Attendance: 500; Referee: Orabi

22 March 1966	Beitar Be'er Sheva	1–0	Hapoel Nahliel
	Banenu 6'			Attendance: 500; Referee: Glidmann

22 March 1966	Hapoel Kiryat Haim	0–2	Beitar Jerusalem	Kiryat Haim Stadium
			Glazer 37', 90'	Attendance: 1000; Referee: Klein

22 March 1966	Maccabi Haifa	1–0	Hapoel Kiryat Ono	Kiryat Eliezer Stadium
	Schlaffenberg 8'			Attendance: 3000; Referee: Ankri

22 March 1966	Hapoel Netanya	1–2 (a.e.t.)	Maccabi Petah Tikva	Hapoel Netanya ground
	Halfon 72'		Kinstlich 15'; I. Seltzer 114'	Attendance: 800; Referee: Handwerk

22 March 1966	Hapoel Ashdod	4–1	Hapoel Kiryat Shmona
	Binyamini 20', 65' ? 51' (o.g.); Sarusi 70'		Malul 1'	Referee: Zamir

22 March 1966	Maccabi Jaffa	3–0	Hapoel Tiberias	Bloomfield Stadium, Tel Aviv
	S. Levi 23'; Ashkenazi 65'; Katsav 90'			Attendance: 200; Referee: Laufer

22 March 1966	Hakoah Maccabi Ramat Gan	2–1 (a.e.t.)	Hapoel Holon	Maccabi Hadera ground
	Shauli 89'; Albucher 104'		Shpringer 86'	Attendance: 1000; Referee: Ashkar

22 March 1966	Hapoel Ra'anana	2–1	Bnei Yehuda
	Chirik 8'; Aharon 20' (pen.)		Mehalel 78'	Attendance: 1000; Referee: Prohaski

22 March 1966	Shimshon Tel Aviv	3–1	Maccabi Netanya	Bloomfield Stadium, Tel Aviv
	Butashvili 7'; Romano 10', 33'		Fengel 87'	Attendance: 500; Referee: Finkelstein

23 March 1966	Hapoel Rishon LeZion	0–6	Hapoel Petah Tikva
			Stelmach 15', 36', 55', 59'; Bachar 22'; Kaufmann 42'	Attendance: 1500; Referee: Nemesh

23 March 1966	Hapoel Haifa	2–1	Hapoel Tel Aviv	Kiryat Haim Stadium
	Goldberg 24'; Gindin 82'		Hazum 23'	Attendance: 4000; Referee: Ashkenazi

23 March 1966	Hapoel Jerusalem	0–4	Maccabi Tel Aviv	Hapoel Jerusalem ground
			Shikva 13', 17'; Talbi 25'; Kedmi 64'	Attendance: 2500; Referee: M. Ashkenazi

=== Seventh Round ===
19 April 1966	Hapoel Mahane Yehuda	0–3	Maccabi Tel Aviv	Hapoel Petah Tikva ground
			Karako 12'; Bachar 25'; Spiegel 27'	Attendance: 3000; Referee: Klein

19 April 1966	Hakoah Maccabi Ramat Gan	2–1	Hapoel Petah Tikva	Bloomfield Stadium, Tel Aviv
	Albucher 43'; Gabai 75'		Kaufmann 40'	Attendance: 3000; Referee: Handwerk

19 April 1966	Hapoel Ashdod	1–3 (a.e.t.)	Shimshon Tel Aviv	Ashdod City Park
	Bitton 33'		Romano 30'; Butashvili 108'; S. Cohen 119'	Attendance: 2000; Referee: Prohaski

19 April 1966	Hapoel Haifa	7–0	Beitar Be'er Sheva	Kiryat Haim Stadium
	Urbach 14', 33'; Goldberg 55', 60'; Picker 64'; V. Young 79'; Gindin 84'			Attendance: 2000; Referee: Laufer

19 April 1966	Hapoel Ramat Gan	3–1	Maccabi Sha'arayim	HaMakhtesh Stadium
	S. Levi 32', 70', 75'		Ratzon 80'	Attendance: 2000; Referee: Uziel

19 April 1966	Maccabi Petah Tikva	1–2 (a.e.t.)	Hapoel Ashkelon	Maccabi Petah Tikva ground
	Kinstlich 5'		Bukovza 40' (pen.); Rosenzweig 91' (o.g.)	Attendance: 2000; Referee: Ankri

19 April 1966	Hapoel Ra'anana	0–1	Maccabi Haifa	Hapoel Ra'anana ground
			Tzvi 7'	Attendance: 2000; Referee: Dudai

25 May 1966	Maccabi Jaffa	1–0 (a.e.t.) (Note: The original match, played on 19 April 1966 ended goalless, with Maccabi Jaffa winning 5–4 in the ensuing penalty shoot-out. Beitar Jerusalem appealed as they weren't allowed to substitute a player ahead of the shoot-out (as regulations allowed) and the match was replayed.)	Beitar Jerusalem	Bloomfield Stadium, Tel Aviv
	Ashkenazi 108'			Attendance: 2000; Referee: Bar-Yossef

=== Quarter-finals ===
1 June 1966

Maccabi Tel Aviv	0–3	Maccabi Haifa
		Bostoni 11'; Sasson 37'; Shmulevich 51'

Maccabiah Stadium, Tel Aviv
Attendance: 10000
Referee: Ashkenazi

1 June 1966

Maccabi Jaffa	1–2	Hapoel Haifa
Ashkenazi 4'		R. Young 18'; Goldberg 32'

Bloomfield Stadium, Tel Aviv
Attendance: 3000
Referee: Handwerk

1 June 1966

Hakoah Maccabi Ramat Gan	1–0	Hapoel Ashkelon
Shaharbani 37'

Bloomfield Stadium, Tel Aviv
Attendance: 1000
Referee: Dudai

1 June 1966

Hapoel Ramat Gan	1–2	Shimshon Tel Aviv
Altrescu 50'		Mizrachi 61'; Romano 89'

HaMakhtesh Stadium
Attendance: 2500

=== Semi-finals ===
4 June 1966

Hakoah Maccabi Ramat Gan	0–1	Shimshon Tel Aviv
		Yefet 65'

Bloomfield Stadium, Tel Aviv
Attendance: 15000
Referee: Fried

4 June 1966

Hapoel Haifa	1–0	Maccabi Haifa
Palgi 67'

Bloomfield Stadium, Tel Aviv
Attendance: 15000
Referee: Klein

=== Final ===
8 June 1966

Hapoel Haifa	2–1	Shimshon Tel Aviv
Goldberg 51'; Gabison 61'		Butashvili 12'

Bloomfield Stadium, Tel Aviv
Attendance: 13000
Referee: Moshe Ashkenazi
