= 1963–64 in Israeli football =

Football in Israel
- Season: 1963–64

Men's football
- Liga Leumit: Hapoel Ramat Gan
- Liga Alef: Maccabi Netanya; Beitar Tel Aviv
- State Cup: Maccabi Tel Aviv

The 1963–64 season was the 16th season of competitive football in Israel and the 38th season under the Israeli Football Association, established in 1928, during the British Mandate.

== Review and Events ==
- Israel hosted its first international tournament, the 1964 AFC Asian Cup. The national team won the tournament, its first major trophy.
- The U-19 national team participated for the first time in the AFC U-19 Championship, sharing the cup with Burma after 0–0 in the final.
- Prior to the U-19 national team's departure to the AFC Youth Championship, several players were questioned by the Military Police on suspicions of falsifying their I.D. cards, in an attempt of making three of the team's squad, Ze'ev Seltzer, Moshe Leon and Danny Borsok, eligible for the competition, as the three were born before the cut-off date of 1 April 1944. The three were released and departed with the team to Saigon, where they were declared ineligible to the competition and didn't take part in it, while the investigation was handed over the civil police. Upon the team's return from the championship, the three were arrested by the police, along with Shmuel Ben-Dror, head of the Israeli delegation to the championship. In July 1964, Seltzer, Borsok and Ben-Dror, along with another IFA executive, Uri Vilenski, were charged with document falsification and knowingly transferring falsified documents. The trial was concluded in February 1965, and Seltzer, Borsok and Vilenski were found guilty, while Ben-Dror was cleared of all charges.
- At the end of the season, the IFA decided to set the number of team in each division to 16 (except for Liga Gimel, in which the number of club in each division was set by the number of clubs registering for the season). This meant that Liga Leumit was expanded from 15 clubs to 16 and both Liga Alef division were expanded from 14 clubs to 16 clubs.

== Domestic leagues ==
=== Promotion and relegation ===
The following promotions and relegations took place at the end of the season:

Promoted to Liga Leumit

- Maccabi Netanya
- Beitar Tel Aviv

Relegated from Liga Leumit

- Hapoel Lod

Promoted to Liga Alef

- Hapoel Safed
- Beitar Haifa
- Hapoel Bnei Nazareth
- Hapoel Netanya
- Hapoel Ra'anana
- Beitar Lod
- Beitar Harari Tel Aviv
- Hapoel Ashkelon
- Maccabi Holon

Relegated from Liga Alef

- Hapoel Nahariya
- Hapoel Givat Haim
- Maccabi Shmuel Tel Aviv
- Hapoel Rishon LeZion

Promoted to Liga Bet

- Hapoel Hulata
- Hapoel Beit Eliezer
- Beitar Beit Lid
- Hapoel Shefayim
- Beitar Petah Tikva
- Beitar Ramat Gan
- Beitar Rehovot
- ASA Jerusalem
- Hapoel Kiryat Malakhi
- Hapoel Be'eri
- Hapoel Yagur
- Beitar Kiryat Tiv'on
- Hapoel Ashdod

Relegated from Liga Bet

- Beitar Acre
- Beitar Safed
- Beitar Binyamina
- Beitar Mahane Yehuda
- Beitar Holon
- Hapoel HaTzafon Jerusalem
- Maccabi Ashkelon
- Maccabi Ramla

== Domestic cups ==
=== Israel State Cup ===
The 1963–64 Israel State Cup, which stated on 21 September 1963, was delayed by a series of appeals on third round results which were settled only by June 1963, forcing the competition to be carried over to the next season.

== National Teams ==
=== National team ===
==== 1964 Summer Olympics qualification ====
The national team competed in the Asian zone of the 1964 Summer Olympics qualification and was drawn to play South Vietnam in the first round. After winning 1–0 in Saigon, Israel suffered a shock 0–2 defeat in Ramat Gan and was eliminated from qualification.

==== 1964 AFC Asian Cup ====
Pos	Team	Pld	W	D	L	GF	GA	GD	Pts	Qualification
1	Israel (H)	3	3	0	0	5	1	+4	6	Champions
2	India	3	2	0	1	5	3	+2	4	Runners-up
3	South Korea	3	1	0	2	2	4	−2	2	Third place
4	Hong Kong	3	0	0	3	1	5	−4	0	Fourth place

Source: RSSSF
(H) Hosts

==== 1963–64 matches ====
29 December 1963 Ol. Q.	South Vietnam	0–1	Israel	Saigon
			Young 20'	Stadium: Republic Stadium; Attendance: 25,000; Referee: (Malaysia) de Silva

17 March 1964 Ol. Q.	Israel	0–2	South Vietnam	Ramat Gan
			Nguyễn Văn Quang 27'; Nguyễn Văn Ngôn 41'	Stadium: Ramat Gan Stadium; Attendance: 40,000; Referee: (Turkey) Gürüz

17 May 1964 Unofficial	Israel	0–4	England U-23	Ramat Gan
		Report (in Hebrew)	Hinton 3', 46'; Tambling 10'; Hurst 12'	Stadium: Ramat Gan Stadium; Attendance: 20,000; Referee: (Greece) Monastiriotis

26 May 1964 Asian Cup	Israel	1–0	Hong Kong	Ramat Gan
	Spiegler 76'			Stadium: Ramat Gan Stadium; Attendance: 25,000; Referee: (Malaysia) Nice

29 May 1964 Asian Cup	Israel	2–0	India	Tel Aviv
	Spiegler 29' (pen.)Aharoni 76'			Stadium: Bloomfield Stadium; Attendance: 20,000; Referee: (Malaysia) Li Pak Tung

3 June 1964 Asian Cup	Israel	2–1	South Korea	Ramat Gan
	Leon 20'Tish 38'		Lee Soon-Myung 79'	Stadium: Ramat Gan Stadium; Attendance: 35,000; Referee: (Iran) Nassiri

=== National U-19 team ===
==== 1964 AFC Youth Championship ====
===== First round =====
Team	Pld	W	D	L	GF	GA	GD	Pts
Israel	3	3	0	0	10	0	+10	6
South Korea	3	2	0	1	3	4	−1	4
Japan	3	0	1	2	1	4	−3	1
Thailand	3	0	1	2	1	7	−6	1

Source: AFC

===== Final =====
28 April 1964 U19 Asian Cup	Israel	0–0	Burma	Saigon
				Stadium: Republic Stadium; Attendance: 40,000
Note: Cup shared
