= 1962–63 Israel State Cup =

Tournament details
- Country: Israel

Final positions
- Champions: Hapoel Haifa
- Runners-up: Maccabi Haifa

The 1962–63 Israel State Cup (Hebrew: גביע המדינה, Gvia HaMedina) was the 24th season of Israel's nationwide football cup competition and the ninth after the Israeli Declaration of Independence.

The competition began on 24 March 1962, before the completion of the previous competition. However, once again, the competition took more than a year to complete, with the final being played on 27 May 1963. Hapoel Haifa and Maccabi Haifa met in the final, at Kiryat Eliezer Stadium, Hapoel winning by a single goal to claim their first cup.

== Results ==
=== Fourth Round ===
Matches were held on 19 May 1962. The match between Maccabi Netanya and Hapoel Petah Tikva, the match between Shimshon Tel Aviv and Hapoel Tel Aviv, and the matches which had to be replayed, were postponed for 6 October 1962, in parallel with the fifth round matches.

Home team	Score	Away team
Hapoel Tiberias	3–1	Hapoel Jerusalem
Beitar Tel Aviv	0–0, replay: 11–0	Hapoel Sha'ariya
Hapoel Kiryat Ono	0–0, replay: 0–4	Hapoel Ramat Gan
YMCA Jerusalem	4–0	Beitar Netanya
Hapoel Givatayim	3–2 (a.e.t.)	Hapoel Safed
Hapoel Eilat	2–1	Hapoel Kiryat Haim
Maccabi Shmuel Tel Aviv	1–2	Beitar Jerusalem
Hapoel Be'er Sheva	6–1	Harari Tel Aviv
Maccabi Haifa	3–1	Hapoel Atlit
Hakoah Tel Aviv	2–4 (a.e.t.)	Maccabi Petah Tikva
Hapoel Kfar Saba	4–2	Maccabi Holon
Maccabi Tel Aviv	4–2	Hapoel Sderot
Hapoel Nahliel	6–1	Hapoel Kiryat Shalom
Hapoel Mahane Yehuda	3–2 (a.e.t.)	Hapoel Lod
Maccabi Hadera	5–3	Maccabi Bat Yam
Hapoel Dimona	2–1 (a.e.t.)	Beitar Kiryat Shmona
Maccabi Rehovot	2–0	Hapoel Kfar Shalem
Maccabi Jaffa	10–1	Hapoel Ashdod
Beitar Ramla	3–1	Maccabi Afula
Maccabi Kiryat Gat	w/o	Hapoel Kfar Blum
Bnei Yehuda	7–1	Beitar Holon
Hapoel Ashkelon	7–1	Hapoel Be'eri
Hapoel Nahariya	4–2	Hapoel Givat Haim
Hapoel Haifa	3–0	Maccabi Herzliya
Hapoel Herzliya	4–0	Hapoel Netanya
Maccabi Netanya	1–2 (a.e.t.)	Hapoel Petah Tikva
Shimshon Tel Aviv	0–1	Hapoel Tel Aviv

Byes: Hapoel Kfar Ata, Hapoel Ramla, Maccabi Ramat Gan, Maccabi Sha'arayim, Shefa-'Amr Club.

=== Fifth Round ===
Matches were held on 6 October 1962. The match between Beitar Tel Aviv and Maccabi Rehovot was held on 2 February 1963. The match between Hapoel Tel Aviv and Maccabi Jaffa was held on 9 February 1963. The match between Hapoel Petah Tikva and Hapoel Ramla and the match between Hapoel Dimona and Beitar Jerusalem were held on 12 February 1963. The replayed match between Beitar Jerusalem and Hapoel Dimona was held on 19 February 1963.

Home team	Score	Away team
Hapoel Kfar Blum	2–3 (a.e.t.)	Maccabi Sha'arayim
Hapoel Haifa	3–2 (a.e.t.)	Maccabi Hadera
Hapoel Tiberias	w/o	Hapoel Herzliya
Maccabi Ramat Gan	1–4	Maccabi Tel Aviv
Maccabi Haifa	3–0	Hapoel Mahane Yehuda
Hapoel Be'er Sheva	1–0	Hapoel Ashkelon
Beitar Ramla	8–2	Shefa-'Amr Club
Hapoel Kfar Saba	4–0	YMCA Jerusalem
Hapoel Nahariya	2–1	Hapoel Nahliel
Hapoel Givatayim	0–3	Maccabi Petah Tikva
Hapoel Eilat	w/o	Bnei Yehuda
Beitar Tel Aviv	4–1	Maccabi Rehovot
Hapoel Ramat Gan	w/o	Hapoel Kfar Ata
Hapoel Tel Aviv	0–2	Maccabi Jaffa
Hapoel Petah Tikva	2–1	Hapoel Ramla
Hapoel Dimona	1–1, replay: 0–2	Beitar Jerusalem

=== Sixth Round ===
Matches were held on 2 March 1963. Hapoel Nahariya surprised by defeating Maccabi Tel Aviv 1–0 through a late goal. Maccabi Tel Aviv appealed the result, claiming Hapoel Nahariya fielded an ineligible player. Initially the match was given to Maccabi Tel Aviv, however, after further appeal, and based on the precedent set by Maccabi Haifa in the previous competition, the result was reinstated. Maccabi Tel Aviv appealed once more, but the appeal wasn't heard until September 1963, by which time the competition was over and the appeal was denied.

2 March 1963	Maccabi Jaffa	1–2	Hapoel Petah Tikva	Bloomfield Stadium
	Ghouhasian 1'		Nahari 51'; Stelmach 73'	Attendance: 15000; Referee: Ne'eman

2 March 1963	Beitar Ramla	1–5	Maccabi Haifa
	Rolnik 64'		Shmulevich 7', 82'; Amar 49', 65', 84'	Attendance: 2000; Referee: S. Mizrahi

2 March 1963	Beitar Tel Aviv	1–2	Hapoel Ramat Gan	Maccabiah Stadium
	Bustamente 85'		Heyman 30', 77'	Attendance: 4000; Referee: Klein

2 March 1963	Maccabi Sha'arayim	4–1	Hapoel Tiberias
	Levi 28', 74', 83'; Shukri 67'		Rogozinski 7'	Attendance: 3400; Referee: Perry

2 March 1963	Hapoel Nahariya	1–0	Maccabi Tel Aviv
	Shushan 88'			Attendance: 4000; Referee: Davidovich

2 March 1963	Beitar Jerusalem	4–1	Hapoel Kfar Saba
	A. Aminoff 6' (pen.); Y. Aminoff 35', 87'; Robovich 80'		Federman 12' (o.g.)	Attendance: 3500; Referee: Hoze

2 March 1963	Hapoel Haifa	4–0	Bnei Yehuda	Kiryat Eliezer Stadium
	Blum 51', 55'; Young 72'; Goldberg 81'			Attendance: 5000; Referee: Werner

2 March 1963	Maccabi Petah Tikva	3–2	Hapoel Be'er Sheva
	Mendel 39', 70'; Seltzer 46'		Nadan 28'; Dekel 67'	Attendance: 1000; Referee: Prohaski

=== Quarter-finals ===
30 March 1963

Hapoel Petah Tikva	5–3	Hapoel Nahariya
Kofman 12', 60'; Nahari 63'; Stelmach 75'; Bechar 89'		Degani 25'; Berkovich 64', 78'

Attendance: 2500
Referee: Ben-Rubi
30 March 1963

Maccabi Haifa	1–0	Maccabi Petah Tikva
Shmulevich 70'

Haifa Municipal Stadium
Attendance: 3000
Referee: Hoze
30 March 1963

Beitar Jerusalem	1–2	Hapoel Haifa
Y. Aminoff 79'		Young 23'; Blum 42'

Attendance: 5000
Referee: Handwerk
30 March 1963

Maccabi Sha'arayim	3–0	Hapoel Ramat Gan
Levi 5', 48'; Melamed 42'

Attendance: 4000
Referee: Fried

=== Semi-finals ===
The matches were supposed to be held on 23 April 1963. However, they were postponed because of the death of President Itzhak Ben-Zvi. The matches were set to 7 May 1963 and 11 May 1963, however, the first match, between Hapoel Haifa and Maccabi Sha'arayim was cancelled due to the falling out of Hapoel and Maccabi factions at the IFA over bribery suspicions against Maccabi Petah Tikva during the 1962–63 Liga Leumit season. The two factions reconciled in time for the second match to be played.

11 May 1963

Hapoel Petah Tikva	1–1	Maccabi Haifa
Markus 38'		Shmulevich 43'

Bloomfield Stadium
Attendance: 16000
Referee: M. Mizrahi

14 May 1963

Hapoel Haifa	3–0	Maccabi Sha'arayim
Oren 32'; Michaelis 54'; Goldberg 76'

Sar-Tov Stadium
Attendance: 3000
Referee: Shoshani

==== Replay ====
22 May 1963

Maccabi Haifa	1–0	Hapoel Petah Tikva
Almani 12'

Ramat Gan Stadium
Attendance: 10000
Referee: Ne'eman

=== Final ===
27 May 1963

Maccabi Haifa	0–1	Hapoel Haifa
		Oren 3'

Kiryat Eliezer Stadium
Attendance: 11000
Referee: Ashkenazi
