= 1961–62 Israel State Cup =

Tournament details
- Country: Israel

Final positions
- Champions: Maccabi Haifa
- Runners-up: Maccabi Tel Aviv

The 1961–62 Israel State Cup (Hebrew: גביע המדינה, Gvia HaMedina) was the 23rd season of Israel's nationwide football cup competition and the eighth after the Israeli Declaration of Independence.

The competition began on 12 February 1961, less than two weeks after the conclusion of the previous competition. Despite this, the competition took slightly less than 15 months to complete, partly due to Israel's involvement in the 1962 FIFA World Cup qualification and its matches against Italy in late 1961.

The IFA sought to play the final on Tu Bishvat, 15 February 1962, with the President presenting the cup, as the previous final was played. However, as the holiday was celebrated on a Saturday, The final was set to 28 February 1962. However, as Maccabi Haifa already committed to a friendly match against Altay S.K. the day before the set date, the match had to be rescheduled. The final was therefore held on 27 March 1962 at Ramat Gan Stadium between Maccabi Haifa and Maccabi Tel Aviv and ended goalless.

The replay was played, at the request of President Itzhak Ben-Zvi, at the Hebrew University Stadium. The date was set to 7 May 1962 and Maccabi Haifa won 5–2 to win its first cup.

== Results ==
=== Fourth Round ===
Matches were played on 29 April 1961.

Home team	Score	Away team
Sektzia Nes Tziona	2–0	Hapoel Rehovot
Beitar Netanya	1–0	Hapoel Hadera
Hapoel Pardes Hanna	3–2	Hapoel Ya'akov Kfar Saba
Hapoel Nahliel	3–0	Maccabi Pardes Hanna
Hapoel Or Yehuda	3–1	Beitar Mahane Yehuda
Maccabi Ramat Amidar	2–0	Beitar Holon
Hapoel HaMechonit	w/o	Hapoel Kfar Ata
Hapoel Ramla	w/o	Maccabi Ramla
Beitar Tel Amal Haifa	w/o	Hapoel Yokneam
Hapoel Kiryat Haim	5–1	Hapoel Tirat HaCarmel
Maccabi Holon	2–3	Hapoel Bat Yam
Hapoel Marmorek	2–1	Hapoel Zikhronot
Hapoel Kfar Blum	w/o	Hapoel Beit She'an
Hapoel Afula	3–0	Hapoel Kiryat Shmona
Hapoel Ganei Tikva	1–1 (a.e.t.)	Hapoel Ramat Gan
Hapoel Be'er Sheva	3–0	Hapoel Ofakim
A.S. Kiryat Biyalik		Maccabi Zikhron Ya'akov

Byes: Hakoah Tel Aviv, Hapoel Mahane Yehuda, Hapoel Tiberias.

==== Replay ====
Home team	Score	Away team
Hapoel Ramat Gan	4–0	Hapoel Ganei Tikva

=== Fifth Round ===
Liga Leumit teams entered the competition at this round. Matches were played on 20 May 1961. The match between Hapoel Marmorek and Maccabi Tel Aviv was played on 17 May 1961.

Home team	Score	Away team
Hapoel Marmorek	1–7	Maccabi Tel Aviv
Hapoel Haifa	0–2	Maccabi Haifa
Hapoel Jerusalem	3–4	Maccabi Netanya
Hapoel Tiberias	w/o	Hakoah Tel Aviv
Hapoel Mahane Yehuda	0–0 (a.e.t.)	Maccabi Petah Tikva
Hapoel Petah Tikva	10–2	Hapoel Kfar Blum
Hapoel Yokneam	1–7	Shimshon Tel Aviv
Hapoel Tel Aviv	3–2 (a.e.t.)	Hapoel Ramat Gan
Hapoel Be'er Sheva	2–1 (a.e.t.)	Maccabi Ramat Amidar
Sektzia Nes Tziona	3–1	Hapoel Bat Yam
Hapoel Pardes Hanna	1–0	Hapoel Kfar Ata
Hapoel Ramla	4–3	Hapoel Nahliel
Hapoel Afula	0–1	Hapoel Kiryat Haim
A.S. Kiryat Biyalik	3–0	Hapoel Or Yehuda
Maccabi Jaffa	3–2	Bnei Yehuda Tel Aviv
Beitar Netanya	1–2 (a.e.t.)	Beitar Tel Aviv

==== Replay ====
Home team	Score	Away team
Maccabi Petah Tikva	2–1	Hapoel Mahane Yehuda

=== Sixth Round ===
Resuming the competition after the summer break and Israel's matches against Italy, most matches were played on 2 December 1961, with the matches between lower leagues' teams Postponed to 12 December 1961.

The match between Maccabi Haifa and Maccabi Netanya ended with a result of 3–1, however, as Maccabi Haifa fielded an ineligible player (Israel Pinkas), the match was given to Maccabi Netanya. However, on an appeal the decision was reversed and the original score confirmed.

2 December 1961	Hapoel Petah Tikva	5–2	Beitar Tel Aviv	Hapoel Petah Tikva Field, Petah Tikva
	Bechar 17'; Kofman 23'; Petroberg 39'; Nahari 46'; Z. Ratzabi 60'		Saides 44'; Bustamente 65'	Attendance: 1000; Referee: Uziel

2 December 1961	Hapoel Tel Aviv	2–1	Hapoel Tiberias	Basa Stadium, Tel Aviv
	Levkovich 75' (pen.); Rosenbaum 85'		Fadal 77'	Attendance: 4000; Referee: Ashkenazi

2 December 1961	Maccabi Petah Tikva	2–3	Maccabi Jaffa
	Becker 20'; Cohen 31'		Ghouhasian 44', 59' (pen.); Ovadia 78'	Attendance: 1000; Referee: Halperin

2 December 1961	Maccabi Haifa	3–1	Maccabi Netanya	Haifa Municipal Stadium
	Shapira 10'; Shmulevich 54'; Menchel 82'		Gershoni 83'	Attendance: 3000; Referee: Barabash

2 December 1961	Maccabi Tel Aviv	3–3 (a.e.t.)	Shimshon Tel Aviv	Maccabiah Stadium, Tel Aviv
	Vilenski 5'; E. Katan 85', 97'		? 21'; Tzemach 67'; Betzalel 115'	Referee: Handwerk

12 December 1961	Hapoel Kiryat Haim	5–0	Sektzia Nes Tziona
	Cimberovski 33', 48'; Ledzinski 78'; Parselani 80', 85'

12 December 1961	Hapoel Be'er Sheva	2–1	Hapoel Ramla	Be'er Sheva
	Dekel 57', 75'		Tabo 82' (pen.)	Referee: Dudai

12 December 1961	Hapoel Pardes Hanna	4–2	A.S. Kiryat Bialik

==== Replay ====
16 December 1961	Shimshon Tel Aviv	1–1 (a.e.t.)	Maccabi Tel Aviv	Basa Stadium, Tel Aviv
	Michel 3' (o.g.)		Tzadok 63' (pen.)	Attendance: 2000; Referee: Frizner

==== Second Replay ====
27 December 1961	Shimshon Tel Aviv	1–4	Maccabi Tel Aviv	Giv'atayim
	Simhi 89' (pen.)		Vilenski 30', 44', 84'; Nahmias 39'	Attendance: 3500; Referee: Ben-Rubi

=== Quarter-finals ===
16 December 1961

Hapoel Kiryat Haim	0–4	Hapoel Petah Tikva
		Stelmach 17', 61'; Kofman 30'; Z. Ratzabi 80'

Attendance: 3000
Referee: Marin
16 December 1961

Maccabi Haifa	2–1	Maccabi Jaffa
Ben-Zvi 76' (pen.); Almani 77'		Ghouhasian 47'

Haifa Municipal Stadium
Attendance: 4000
Referee: Fried
16 December 1961

Hapoel Tel Aviv	1–3	Hapoel Be'er Sheva
Levkovich 51' (pen.)		Dekel 13'; Maurice 42'; Vered 43'

Basa Stadium, Tel Aviv
Attendance: 1000
Referee: Ashkenazi
3 January 1962

Maccabi Tel Aviv	6–0	Hapoel Pardes Hanna
Vilenski 4', 59', 78'; N. Bechar 10'; Fleschel 21'; Goldstein 52'

=== Semi-finals ===
3 February 1962

Hapoel Petah Tikva	1–5	Maccabi Haifa
Vissoker 56' (pen.)		Hardy 11'; Shmulevich 12', 47', 80'; Menchel 68'

Maccabiah Stadium, Tel Aviv
Attendance: 10000
Referee: Mizrahi

3 February 1962

Hapoel Be'er Sheva	0–3	Maccabi Tel Aviv
		Y. Glazer 2'; Fleschel 6', 38'

Katamon, Jerusalem
Attendance: 4500
Referee: Fried

=== Final ===
27 March 1962

Maccabi Haifa	0–0 (a.e.t.)	Maccabi Tel Aviv

Ramat Gan Stadium
Attendance: 37000
Referee: Dudai

==== Replay ====
7 May 1962

Maccabi Haifa	5–2	Maccabi Tel Aviv
Hardy 5'; Shapira 7', 34'; Menchel 13', 27'		Y. Glazer 36'; Bechar 51'

Hebrew University Stadium
Attendance: 15000
Referee: Dudai
