= 1965–66 Liga Alef =

Liga Alef
- Season: 1965-66
- Champions: North Division - Maccabi Haifa, South Division - Sektzia Nes Tziona
- Promoted: North Division - Maccabi Haifa, South Division - Sektzia Nes Tziona
- Relegated: North Division - Hapoel Kiryat Shmona, Beitar Haifa, South Division - HaBira Jerusalem, Hapoel Givatayim

The 1965–66 Liga Alef season saw Maccabi Haifa (champions of the North Division) and SK Nes Tziona (champions of the South Division) win the title and promotion to Liga Leumit.

== North Division ==
Pos	Team	Pld	W	D	L	GF	GA	GD	Pts	Promotion or relegation
1	Maccabi Haifa	30	24	4	2	66	9	+57	52	Promoted to Liga Leumit
2	Hapoel Kfar Saba	30	20	3	7	62	37	+25	43	
3	Hapoel Kiryat Haim	30	14	6	10	42	28	+14	34	
4	Hapoel Hadera	30	12	10	8	29	28	+1	34	
5	Beitar Netanya	30	13	7	10	44	38	+6	33	
6	Hapoel Kfar Blum	30	11	10	9	42	36	+6	32	
7	Hapoel Tiberias	30	14	3	13	54	52	+2	31	
8	Hapoel Safed	30	13	4	13	49	46	+3	30	
9	Hapoel Nahliel	30	6	16	8	27	31	−4	28	
10	Hapoel Bnei Nazareth	30	9	9	12	33	45	−12	27	
11	Hapoel Netanya	30	8	10	12	47	56	−9	26	
12	Hapoel Acre	30	10	5	15	43	47	−4	25	
13	Hapoel Herzliya	30	7	9	14	36	51	−15	23	
14	Maccabi Hadera	30	8	7	15	34	54	−20	23	
15	Hapoel Kiryat Shmona	30	7	7	16	26	51	−25	21	Relegated to Liga Bet
16	Beitar Haifa	30	6	6	18	33	58	−25	18	Relegated to Liga Bet

== South Division ==
Pos	Team	Pld	W	D	L	GF	GA	GD	Pts	Promotion or relegation
1	SK Nes Tziona	30	20	5	5	49	25	+24	45	Promoted to Liga Leumit
2	Maccabi Ramat Amidar	30	17	8	5	56	23	+33	42	
3	Beitar Jerusalem	30	17	6	7	68	31	+37	40	
4	Hapoel Holon	30	15	7	8	49	34	+15	37	
5	Hapoel Ashkelon	30	9	16	5	43	42	+1	34	
6	Hapoel Rishon LeZion	30	9	14	7	44	32	+12	32	
7	Beitar Ramla	30	13	5	12	51	47	+4	31	
8	Maccabi Holon	30	9	13	8	35	37	−2	31	
9	Hapoel Lod	30	11	9	10	35	33	+2	29 (Note: Two points deducted)	
10	Hapoel Kiryat Ono	30	7	13	10	31	32	−1	27	
11	Hapoel Kfar Shalem	30	7	10	13	37	49	−12	24	
12	Hapoel Marmorek	30	8	8	14	30	46	−16	24	
13	Beitar Lod	30	7	10	13	32	55	−23	24	
14	Beitar Kiryat Ono	30	8	5	17	34	47	−13	21	
15	HaBira Jerusalem	30	7	5	18	31	70	−39	19	Relegated to Liga Bet
16	Hapoel Giv'atayim	30	5	6	19	29	51	−22	16	Relegated to Liga Bet
