= 1943–44 Liga Bet =

Palestinian association football competition

Palestine League Liga Bet
- Season: 1943–44
- Matches: 61
- Goals: 290 (4.75 per match)

The 1943–44 Liga Bet was the fifth season of second tier football in Mandatory Palestine.

The season began on 30 October 1943, and was played until the summer break, on 24 June 1944. Initially seven teams competed in the league, but after several weeks more teams, including reserve teams of Palestine League teams were added to the line-up. By the end of the season, no team played all its matches and the season was never completed.

== League table ==
Pos	Team	Pld	W	D	L	GF	GA	GR	Pts	HIR	BPT	MTA	BNE	HTA	MRG	HRR	BRG	MPT	BYE	MRV	BRL	HNE	EGG
1	Hapoel Itzhar Ramat Gan	13	10	1	2	52	14	3.714	21	—		3–0 (Note: Walkover win.)	5–0	5–3	5–0		2–3	9–0	8–1		3–0		
2	Beitar Petah Tikva	10	8	1	1	33	12	2.750	17	3–1	—	1–1			5–2	2–0				6–3	8–1		2–0
3	Maccabi Tel Aviv B	10	7	2	1	35	16	2.188	16		2–1	—			6–1	8–3				4–1	6–2		
4	Beitar Netanya	12	7	0	5	30	24	1.250	14	4–1	1–3		—	3–0	3–0	1–0	3–1	4–0	4–0 (Note: Abandoned at the 70th minute.)			6–4	
5	Hapoel Tel Aviv B	11	6	0	5	23	19	1.211	12				3–1	—	3–2		4–0				3–0		
6	Maccabi Ramat Gan	15	6	1	8	26	38	0.684	13		1–2		4–3	2–1	—		2–2		1–2	3–0	2–1	3–0	
7	Harari Tel Aviv	9	4	1	4	15	19	0.789	9	1–1						—	2–1	5–0	1–0		3–0 (Note: Abandoned at the 70th minute. Given as a 3–0 victory to Harari Tel Aviv.)		
8	Beitar Ramat Gan	11	3	2	6	20	29	0.690	8					3–2	1–2		—			3–2	4–1	1–1	
9	Maccabi Meir Petah Tikva	10	3	1	6	17	32	0.531	7	2–4				0–2	4–1			—				3–0	3–0
10	Bnei Yehuda	6	3	0	3	15	17	0.882	6									5–3	—		7–0		
11	Maccabi Rehovot B	8	3	0	5	15	21	0.714	6			1–4		2–0						—	3–1		3–0
12	Beitar Rishon LeZion	13	2	1	10	20	45	0.444	5	0–2							7–2	2–2			—	5–0	
13	Hapoel Netanya	6	1	1	4	11	18	0.611	3							6–0						—	
14	Egged Tel Aviv	4	0	1	3	2	10	0.200	1			2–2											—

Updated to match(es) played on 24 June 1944. Source: IFA,
