= 1963–64 Liga Bet =

Israeli football season

The 1963–64 Liga Bet season saw Hapoel Safed, Hapoel Netanya, Beitar Lod and Hapoel Ashkelon win their regional divisions and promoted to Liga Alef.

Second placed clubs, Beitar Haifa, Hapoel Ra'anana, Beitar Harari Tel Aviv and Maccabi Holon were also promoted, as Liga Alef expanded to 16 clubs in each division. also, as there was an odd number of clubs for next season Liga Alef (15 teams competed in Liga Leumit), another promotion spot given to the best third placed club (rather than promotion playoffs), which was Hapoel Bnei Nazareth.

== North Division A ==
Pos	Team	Pld	W	D	L	GF	GA	GD	Pts	Promotion or relegation
1	Hapoel Safed	30	–	–	–	84	24	+60	49	Promoted to Liga Alef
2	Beitar Haifa	30	–	–	–	70	22	+48	47	Promoted to Liga Alef
3	Hapoel Bnei Nazareth	30	–	–	–	67	21	+46	47	Promoted to Liga Alef
4	Hapoel Kiryat Shmona	30	–	–	–	61	21	+40	40	
5	Hapoel Kfar Ata	30	–	–	–	54	32	+22	36	
6	Beitar Kiryat Shmona	30	–	–	–	47	42	+5	35	
7	A.S. Kiryat Bialik	30	–	–	–	59	59	0	28	
8	Hapoel Afikim	30	–	–	–	53	52	+1	27	
9	Hapoel Afula	30	–	–	–	46	53	−7	27	
10	Hapoel Migdal HaEmek	30	–	–	–	38	52	−14	25	
11	Shefa-'Amr Club	30	–	–	–	33	60	−27	23	
12	Beitar Nahariya	30	–	–	–	34	54	−20	22	
13	Hapoel Ramat David	30	–	–	–	35	72	−37	21	
14	Hapoel HaMechonit Tel Hanan (Note: Hapoel HaMechonit merged with Hapoel Tel Hanan)	30	–	–	–	34	54	−20	19	
15	Beitar Acre	30	–	–	–	35	62	−27	19	Relegated to Liga Gimel
16	Beitar Safed	30	–	–	–	22	86	−64	1	Relegated to Liga Gimel

== North Division B ==
Pos	Team	Pld	W	D	L	GF	GA	GD	Pts	Promotion or relegation
1	Hapoel Netanya	30	–	–	–	89	26	+63	49	Promoted to Liga Alef
2	Hapoel Ra'anana	30	–	–	–	75	27	+48	46	Promoted to Liga Alef
3	M.S. Even Yehuda	30	–	–	–	70	29	+41	45	
4	Beitar Kiryat Ono	30	–	–	–	46	41	+5	32	
5	Hapoel Kfar Shalem	30	–	–	–	50	46	+4	31	
6	Hapoel Pardesiya	30	–	–	–	56	53	+3	30	
7	Hapoel Pardes Hanna	30	–	–	–	39	49	−10	27	
8	Hapoel Atlit	30	–	–	–	43	52	−9	25	
9	Hapoel Tirat HaCarmel	30	–	–	–	48	60	−12	25	
10	Hapoel Givat Olga	30	–	–	–	56	70	−14	25	
11	Hapoel Dora Netanya	30	–	–	–	36	64	−28	25	
12	Hapoel Ganei Tikva	30	–	–	–	38	49	−11	24	
13	Maccabi Neve Shalom	30	–	–	–	54	64	−10	23	
14	Maccabi Pardes Hanna	30	–	–	–	44	58	−14	23	
15	Beitar Binyamina	30	–	–	–	48	72	−24	23	Relegated to Liga Gimel
16	Beitar Mahane Yehuda	30	–	–	–	44	76	−32	21	Relegated to Liga Gimel

== South Division A ==
Pos	Team	Pld	W	D	L	GF	GA	GD	Pts	Promotion or relegation
1	Beitar Lod	30	–	–	–	59	33	+26	46	Promoted to Liga Alef
2	Beitar Harari Tel Aviv	30	–	–	–	61	37	+24	39	Promoted to Liga Alef
3	Hapoel HaTzafon Tel Aviv	30	–	–	–	55	41	+14	37	
4	Hapoel Bat Yam	30	–	–	–	53	40	+13	37	
5	Maccabi Herzliya	30	–	–	–	53	40	+13	36	
6	Maccabi Bat Yam	30	–	–	–	65	33	+32	34	
7	Hapoel HaDarom Kiryat Shalom	30	–	–	–	47	47	0	31	
8	Hapoel Be'er Ya'akov	30	–	–	–	51	52	−1	31	
9	Maccabi Ramat Gan	30	–	–	–	60	56	+4	29	
10	Hapoel Ya'akov Kfar Saba	30	–	–	–	67	72	−5	25	
11	Beitar Ezra	30	–	–	–	43	49	−6	25	
12	Hapoel Yehud	30	–	–	–	35	43	−8	25	
13	Hapoel Shikun HaMizrah	30	–	–	–	55	53	+2	24	
14	Hapoel Azor	30	–	–	–	57	63	−6	23	
15	Beitar Holon	30	–	–	–	27	61	−34	15	Relegated to Liga Gimel
16	Hapoel HaTzafon Jerusalem	30	–	–	–	30	101	−71	11	Relegated to Liga Gimel

== South Division B ==
Pos	Team	Pld	W	D	L	GF	GA	GD	Pts	Promotion or relegation
1	Hapoel Ashkelon	30	–	–	–	69	21	+48	47	Promoted to Liga Alef
2	Maccabi Holon	30	–	–	–	78	33	+45	43	Promoted to Liga Alef
3	Hapoel Avraham Be'er Sheva	30	–	–	–	48	26	+22	38	
4	Hapoel Ofakim	30	–	–	–	59	38	+21	35	
5	Maccabi Rehovot	30	–	–	–	65	58	+7	35	
6	Hapoel Dorot Sha'ar HaNegev	30	–	–	–	49	43	+6	35	
7	Hapoel Eilat	30	–	–	–	47	42	+5	32	
8	Hapoel Sderot	30	–	–	–	70	41	+29	30	
9	Hapoel Rehovot	30	–	–	–	45	55	−10	27	
10	Beitar Be'er Sheva	30	–	–	–	45	39	+6	26	
11	Hapoel Bnei Zion	30	–	–	–	39	40	−1	25	
12	Hapoel Or Yehuda	30	–	–	–	39	65	−26	24	
13	Beitar Ekron	30	–	–	–	36	68	−32	24	
14	Hapoel Merhavim	30	–	–	–	22	57	−35	22	
15	Maccabi Ashkelon	30	–	–	–	40	62	−22	21	Relegated to Liga Gimel
16	Maccabi Ramla	30	–	–	–	16	83	−67	4	Relegated to Liga Gimel
