= 1963–64 Liga Alef =

Liga Alef
- Season: 1963–64
- Champions: Maccabi Netanya (North); Beitar Tel Aviv (South)
- Promoted: Maccabi Netanya (North); Beitar Tel Aviv (South)
- Relegated: Hapoel Nahariya (North); Hapoel Givat Haim (North); Maccabi Shmuel Tel Aviv (South); Hapoel Rishon LeZion (South)

The 1963–64 Liga Alef season saw Maccabi Netanya (champions of the North Division) and Beitar Tel Aviv (champions of the South Division) win the title and promotion to Liga Leumit.

The following season, Liga Alef expanded to 16 clubs in each division.

== North Division ==
Pos	Team	Pld	W	D	L	GF	GA	GD	Pts	Promotion or relegation
1	Maccabi Netanya	26	22	3	1	86	17	+69	47	Promoted to Liga Leumit
2	Hapoel Hadera	26	14	10	2	40	12	+28	37 (Note: 1 point deducted)	
3	Hapoel Mahane Yehuda	26	15	8	3	61	30	+31	35 (Note: 3 points deducted)	
4	Hapoel Acre	26	10	8	8	46	43	+3	28	
5	Hapoel Kfar Saba	26	10	6	10	40	30	+10	26	
6	Beitar Netanya	26	8	8	10	37	38	−1	24	
7	Hapoel Kiryat Haim	26	9	6	11	28	31	−3	24	
8	Hapoel Kfar Blum	26	8	7	11	44	45	−1	23	
9	Hapoel Herzliya	26	7	7	12	32	43	−11	21	
10	Hapoel Nahliel	26	5	10	11	25	43	−18	20	
11	Maccabi Hadera	26	8	4	14	36	57	−21	20	
12	Maccabi Zikhron Ya'akov	26	6	8	12	38	77	−39	20	
13	Hapoel Nahariya	26	5	8	13	36	51	−15	18	Relegated to Liga Bet
14	Hapoel Givat Haim	26	7	3	16	38	70	−32	17	Relegated to Liga Bet

== South Division ==
Pos	Team	Pld	W	D	L	GF	GA	GD	Pts	Promotion or relegation
1	Beitar Tel Aviv	26	18	3	5	64	15	+49	39	Promoted to Liga Leumit
2	Hapoel Be'er Sheva	26	18	3	5	52	16	+36	39	
3	Beitar Jerusalem	26	13	6	7	56	34	+22	32	
4	Hapoel Giv'atayim	26	12	7	7	45	29	+16	31	
5	Hapoel Holon	26	11	9	6	43	29	+14	29 (Note: 2 points deducted)	
6	Hapoel Ramla	26	15	2	9	53	50	+3	28 (Note: 4 points deducted)	
7	Maccabi Ramat Amidar	26	10	7	9	39	35	+4	27	
8	SK Nes Tziona	26	8	6	12	33	38	−5	22	
9	Beitar Ramla	26	7	8	11	31	42	−11	22	
10	Hapoel Marmorek	26	8	6	12	18	48	−30	22	
11	YMCA Jerusalem	26	7	9	10	30	51	−21	21	
12	Hapoel Kiryat Ono	26	6	8	12	39	54	−15	20	
13	Maccabi Shmuel Tel Aviv	26	4	6	16	26	57	−31	14	Relegated to Liga Bet
14	Hapoel Rishon LeZion	26	3	6	17	26	57	−31	12	Relegated to Liga Bet
