= Carlos Bustamente =

Carlos Bustamente or Bustamante may refer to:

- Carlos Bustamante (biophysicist) (born 1951), Peruvian-American scientist
- Carlos Bustamante (TV personality), Canadian entertainment reporter for ET Canada and former host of The Zone
- Carlos Bustamente (soccer), U.S. soccer forward
