= 1939 Palestine League =

Palestine League
- Season: 1939

The 1939 Palestine League was the seventh season of league football in the British Mandate for Palestine.

Due to the Arab Revolt the league was split into regional leagues in Tel Aviv (two tiers), Samaria and South districts, while in Jerusalem, Haifa and Tiberias leagues were played, managed by the British Army.

Maccabi Tel Aviv won the Tel Aviv regional league on goal average, while Beitar Netanya and Maccabi Rehovot won the Samaria and Southern divisions. Neither of the winning teams is listed as champions in the Israel Football Association.

== Tel Aviv regional league ==
=== Division I ===
Pos	Team	Pld	W	D	L	GF	GA	GR	Pts
1	Maccabi Tel Aviv (C)	10	8	1	1	32	8	4.000	17
2	Hapoel Tel Aviv	10	8	1	1	31	10	3.100	17
3	Maccabi Petah Tikva	10	5	1	4	16	12	1.333	11
4	Maccabi Nes Tziona	10	3	1	6	12	28	0.429	7
5	Hapoel Herzliya	10	1	2	7	13	28	0.464	4
6	Hakoah Tel Aviv	10	1	2	7	13	31	0.419	4

Updated to match(es) played on 25 November 1939. Source: IFA, The Palestine Post
(C) Champions

=== Division II ===
Pos	Team	Pld	W	D	L	GF	GA	GR	Pts
1	Beitar Tel Aviv (C)	22	20	2	0	110	13	8.462	42
2	Degel Zion Tel Aviv	22	16	3	3	91	17	5.353	35
3	Egged Tel Aviv	21	16	2	3	72	24	3.000	34
4	Hapoel Petah Tikva	22	13	4	5	63	34	1.853	30
5	Hegge Tel Aviv	22	13	2	7	68	27	2.519	28
6	HaTehiya Tel Aviv	22	12	3	7	54	45	1.200	27
7	Hapoel Ramat Gan	21	7	2	12	57	86	0.663	16
8	Hakoah Maccabi Petah Tikva	21	6	2	13	45	63	0.714	14
9	Maccabi Herzliya	21	5	3	13	30	64	0.469	13
10	Hapoel Ra'anana	22	5	1	16	22	85	0.259	11
11	Maccabi Ramat Gan	21	2	1	18	19	102	0.186	5
12	HaKochav Tel Aviv	22	1	1	20	15	75	0.200	3

Updated to match(es) played on 24 December 1939. Source: IFA, The Palestine Post
(C) Champions

== Samaria regional league ==
Pos	Team	Pld	W	D	L	GF	GA	GR	Pts
1	Beitar Netanya (C)	10	7	1	2	27	5	5.400	15
2	Hapoel Hadera	10	7	1	2	37	9	4.111	15
3	Maccabi Netanya	10	4	2	4	12	16	0.750	10
4	Maccabi Binyamina	10	4	1	5	21	22	0.955	9
5	Maccabi Hadera	10	2	2	6	10	24	0.417	6
6	Hapoel Netanya	10	2	1	7	7	38	0.184	5

Updated to match(es) played on 13 May1939. Source: IFA, The Palestine Post
(C) Champions

== Southern regional league ==
Pos	Team	Pld	W	D	L	GF	GA	GR	Pts
1	Maccabi Rehovot (C)	14	12	0	2	52	11	4.727	24
2	Hapoel Rishon LeZion	14	10	3	1	48	21	2.286	23
3	RSG Rehovot	14	10	2	2	40	17	2.353	22
4	Maccabi Gedera	14	5	1	8	18	27	0.667	11
5	Maccabi Rishon LeZion	14	4	1	9	33	27	1.222	8 (Note: No points or goals were awarded for a match between Maccabi Rishon LeZion and Beitar Rishon LeZion.)
6	Hapoel Rehovot	14	4	0	10	23	37	0.622	8
7	Hapoel Nes Tziona	14	3	0	11	18	52	0.346	6
8	Beitar Rishon LeZion	14	3	1	10	18	58	0.310	6

Updated to match(es) played on 3 December 1939. Source: IFA, The Palestine Post
(C) Champions
