= Michael Kadosh =

Israeli footballer and manager

Michael Kadosh מיכאל קדוש
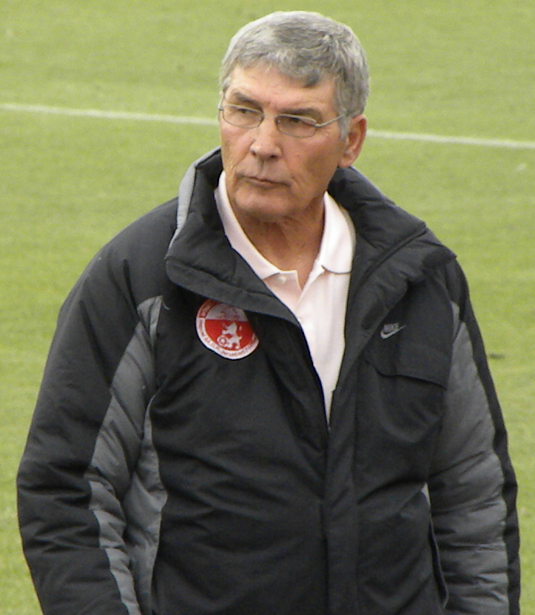

Personal information
- Full name: Michael Kadosh
- Date of birth: 23 April 1940
- Place of birth: Alexandria, Egypt
- Date of death: 29 April 2014 (aged 74)
- Position: Goalkeeper

Youth career
- Maccabi Jaffa

Senior career*
Years	Team	Apps	(Gls)
1957–1958	Maccabi Jaffa		
1958–1970	Hakoah Ramat Gan		
1970–1971	Maccabi Netanya		
1971–1976	Maccabi Tel Aviv		

Managerial career
- 1976–1978: Hapoel Lod
- 1978–1980: Hakoah Ramat Gan
- 1980–1982: Maccabi Ramat Amidar
- 1982–1983: Maccabi Yavne
- 1983–1984: Hapoel Ashkelon
- 1984–1985: Maccabi Yavne
- 1985: Hapoel Lod
- 1985–1986: Shimshon Tel Aviv
- 1986–1987: Hapoel Ramat Gan
- 1987–1989: Maccabi Yavne
- 1989–1990: Maccabi Sha'arayim
- 1990–1991: Hapoel Ashdod
- 1991–1992: Beitar Jerusalem
- 1992–1993: Hapoel Ashkelon
- 1993–1996: Beitar Tel Aviv
- 1996–1998: Hakoah Ramat Gan
- 1998–1999: Hapoel Ashdod
- 1999–2000: Beitar Be'er Sheva
- 2000–2003: Hapoel Be'er Sheva
- 2003–2004: Hapoel Kfar Saba
- 2004–2005: Maccabi Herzliya
- 2005: Hapoel Be'er Sheva
- 2005–2006: Bnei Sakhnin
- 2006–2007: Maccabi Ahi Nazareth
- 2007–2009: Hapoel Jerusalem
- 2009–2010: Beitar Shimshon Tel Aviv
- 2010–2012: Hapoel Jerusalem
- 2013: Hapoel Ashkelon
- * Club domestic league appearances and goals

Michael "Lufa" Kadosh (Hebrew: מיכאל "לופא" קדוש; April 23, 1940 – April 29, 2014) was an Israeli footballer who also worked as the manager of Hapoel Jerusalem.

He died on 29 April 2014 from cancer at the age of 74.

== Honours ==
=== As a player ===
- Israeli Premier League (3):
  - 1964-65, 1970–71, 1971–72
- Israel State Cup (1):
  - 1969

=== As a manager ===
- Israeli Second Division (2):
  - 1978-79, 2000–01
- Toto Cup (Artzit) (1):
  - 1996-97
- Israeli Third Division (2):
  - 2007-08, 2010–11
