= 1964–65 Liga Alef =

Liga Alef
- Season: 1964-65
- Champions: Hapoel Mahane Yehuda (North); Hapoel Be'er Sheva (South)
- Promoted: Hapoel Mahane Yehuda (North); Hapoel Be'er Sheva (South)
- Relegated: Maccabi Zikhron Ya'akov (North); Hapoel Ra'anana (North); Hapoel Ramla (South; Harari Tel Aviv (South)

The 1964–65 Liga Alef season saw Hapoel Mahane Yehuda (champions of the North Division) and Hapoel Be'er Sheva (champions of the South Division) win the title and promotion to Liga Leumit.

== North Division ==
Pos	Team	Pld	W	D	L	GF	GA	GD	Pts	Promotion or relegation
1	Hapoel Mahane Yehuda	30	20	6	4	76	23	+53	46	Promoted to Liga Leumit
2	Beitar Netanya	30	16	7	7	57	26	+31	39	
3	Hapoel Kfar Saba	30	16	6	8	46	29	+17	38	
4	Hapoel Acre	30	13	11	6	64	50	+14	37	
5	Hapoel Hadera	30	12	7	11	47	39	+8	31	
6	Hapoel Kiryat Haim	30	11	9	10	51	48	+3	31	
7	Hapoel Kfar Blum	30	10	9	11	43	47	−4	29	
8	Maccabi Hadera	30	10	9	11	38	55	−17	29	
9	Hapoel Herzliya	30	9	9	12	45	40	+5	27	
10	Beitar Haifa	30	10	6	14	36	39	−3	26	
11	Hapoel Netanya	30	10	6	14	43	54	−11	26	
12	Hapoel Bnei Nazareth	30	8	10	12	28	49	−21	26	
13	Hapoel Nahliel	30	8	9	13	32	43	−11	25	
14	Hapoel Safed	30	10	5	15	42	56	−14	25	
15	Maccabi Zikhron Ya'akov	30	8	7	15	43	71	−28	23	Relegated to Liga Bet
16	Hapoel Ra'anana	30	8	6	16	26	58	−32	22	Relegated to Liga Bet

== South Division ==
Pos	Team	Pld	W	D	L	GF	GA	GD	Pts	Promotion or relegation
1	Hapoel Be'er Sheva	30	21	4	5	70	23	+47	46	Promoted to Liga Leumit
2	Beitar Jerusalem	30	16	5	9	67	37	+30	37	
3	Beitar Ramla	30	15	7	8	50	40	+10	37	
4	SK Nes Tziona	30	15	6	9	52	38	+14	36	
5	Hapoel Kiryat Ono	30	14	7	9	34	34	0	35	
6	Maccabi Ramat Amidar	30	12	10	8	45	28	+17	34	
7	Hapoel Giv'atayim	30	10	13	7	39	41	−2	33	
8	Hapoel Holon	30	11	9	10	57	41	+16	31	
9	Hapoel Ashkelon	30	10	11	9	55	48	+7	31	
10	Maccabi Holon	30	10	11	9	42	42	0	31	
11	Hapoel Lod	30	10	10	10	40	42	−2	30	
12	Hapoel Marmorek	30	10	7	13	44	45	−1	27	
13	HaBira Jerusalem (Note: YMCA Jerusalem renamed to HaBira Jerusalem)	30	8	6	16	31	40	−9	22	
14	Beitar Lod	30	7	6	17	29	65	−36	20	
15	Hapoel Ramla	30	6	7	17	32	62	−30	19	Relegated to Liga Bet
16	Beitar Harari Tel Aviv	30	2	7	21	32	93	−61	11	Relegated to Liga Bet
