= Rafi Baranes =

Israeli footballer (1943–2026)

Personal information
- Date of birth: 1943
- Date of death: 1 June 2026 (aged 83)
- Positions: Winger; midfielder

Senior career*
Years	Team	Apps	(Gls)
1964–1971	Maccabi Tel Aviv	72	
- * Club domestic league appearances and goals

Rafi Baranes (Hebrew: רפי ברנס; 1943 – 1 June 2026) was an Israeli footballer who played as a midfielder or winger. He was one of the most decorated players in the history of Maccabi Tel Aviv, winning nine trophies with the club during the 1960s.

== Career ==
Baranes was a one-club man, spending his whole career at Maccabi Tel Aviv. He helped the club win nine trophies, including two Liga Leumit titles, three Israel State Cups, two Israel Super Cups, and the 1969 Asian Champion Club Tournament against South Korean side Yangzee.

In the 1965 Israel State Cup final, he scored in extra time (the 112th minute of the game) against Bnei Yehuda Tel Aviv to help Maccabi Tel Aviv secure the title.

== Personal life and death ==
Baranes was married and had two sons. Following his retirement in 1971, he moved to business, where he founded an independent company that specialized in installing various electronics.

Baranes died on 1 June 2026, at the age of 83.

== See also ==
- List of one-club men in association football
