= Yosef Heine =

Israeli footballer

Yosef Heine יוסף היינה
Personal information
- Full name: Yosef Heine
- Place of birth: Israel
- Position: Striker

Senior career*
Years	Team	Apps	(Gls)
19xx–1954	Hakoah Ramat Gan		
1954–1964	Maccabi Netanya	181	(60)
- * Club domestic league appearances and goals

Yosef Heine (Hebrew: יוסף היינה) is a retired Israeli footballer.
