= Hapoel Bavli Tel Aviv F.C. =

Hapoel Bavli Tel Aviv
- Full name: Hapoel Bavli Tel Aviv Football Club הפועל בבלי תל אביב
- Founded: 1964
- Dissolved: 1968
- 1966–68: 5th

Hapoel Bavli Tel Aviv (Hebrew: הפועל בבלי תל אביב) was an Israeli football club based in Bavli neighborhood in Tel Aviv and was associated with Hapoel branch in Tel Aviv. The Club played for three seasons in Liga Gimel, then the fourth tier of the Israeli football league system, achieving its best position at the end of 1966–68 double season, when it finished fifth, and in the Israel State Cup, where the club reached the fourth round in 1966, where it lost 1–3 to Beitar Be'er Sheva.
