= Tony Bonezzi =

Argentine-born American-Israeli soccer player

Personal information
- Full name: Antonio Bonezzi
- Date of birth: 30 November 1931
- Place of birth: La Pampa, Argentina
- Date of death: 1 January 1967 (aged 35)
- Place of death: Israel
- Position: Midfielder

Senior career*
Years	Team	Apps	(Gls)
1959	Montreal Alouettes		
1959–1960	Colombo		
1961–1966	Beitar Tel Aviv		
1962	Ukrainian Nationals		
1962	Buffalo White Eagles		
1962	Toronto Italia		

International career
1961	United States	1	(0)
1961	Israel	1	(0)
- * Club domestic league appearances and goals

Antonio "Tony" Bonezzi (30 November 1931 – 1 January 1967) was a footballer. Born in Argentina, he played international football for both the United States and Israel.

== Playing career ==
He played as a midfielder for Colombo and Beitar Tel Aviv. In 1959, he played in the National Soccer League with Montreal Alouettes. In 1962, he played in the American Soccer League with Ukrainian Nationals. For the remainder of 1962, he played in the Eastern Canada Professional Soccer League with the Buffalo White Eagles. Midway through the season, he was traded to league rivals Toronto Italia.
