= Beitar Rishon LeZion F.C. =

Beitar Rishon LeZion
- Full name: Beitar Rishon LeZion Football Club בית"ר ראשון לציון
- Founded: 1939
- Dissolved: 1966
- 1965–66: 4th (Central division)

Beitar Rishon LeZion F.C. (Hebrew: בית"ר ראשון לציון) was a football club from Rishon LeZion, Israel. The club was active from the 1930s to the 1960s, playing one season in the second division prior to the Israeli Declaration of Independence.

After the 1948 Arab–Israeli War, the club played in the lower divisions, until it folded at the end of the 1965–66 season. In 1963–64 Israel State Cup, the club advanced to the fifth round, its best achievement in the cup.
