= 1964–65 Liga Leumit =

Liga Leumit
- Season: 1964–65
- Champions: Hakoah Maccabi Ramat Gan; 1st title
- Relegated: Maccabi Haifa; Hapoel Tiberias
- Top goalscorer: Israel Ashkenazi; Zaki Mizrahi (18)

The 1964–65 Liga Leumit season saw Hakoah Ramat Gan crowned champions for the first time in their history, beating Hapoel Petah Tikva to the title on goal difference. Israel Ashkenazi (Maccabi Jaffa) and Zaki Mizrahi (Bnei Yehuda) were the joint top scorers with 18 goals each.

Maccabi Haifa and Hapoel Tiberias were relegated to Liga Alef.

== Final table ==
Pos	Team	Pld	W	D	L	GF	GA	GD	Pts	Qualification or relegation
1	Hakoah Ramat Gan	30	13	11	6	42	24	+18	37	Champions
2	Hapoel Petah Tikva	30	15	7	8	54	42	+12	37	
3	Hapoel Tel Aviv	30	15	6	9	48	30	+18	36	
4	Maccabi Tel Aviv	30	14	5	11	46	31	+15	33	
5	Hapoel Haifa	30	12	8	10	48	38	+10	32	
6	Maccabi Sha'arayim	30	12	7	11	28	32	−4	31	
7	Maccabi Netanya	30	14	3	13	46	56	−10	31	
8	Hapoel Ramat Gan	30	12	6	12	34	34	0	30	
9	Shimshon Tel Aviv	30	9	12	9	38	39	−1	30	
10	Maccabi Petah Tikva	30	10	9	11	39	42	−3	29	
11	Bnei Yehuda	30	9	10	11	48	48	0	28	
12	Maccabi Jaffa	30	11	6	13	44	49	−5	28	
13	Hapoel Jerusalem	30	9	10	11	32	39	−7	28	
14	Beitar Tel Aviv	30	10	7	13	33	39	−6	27	
15	Maccabi Haifa	30	8	8	14	42	44	−2	24	Relegated to Liga Alef
16	Hapoel Tiberias	30	6	7	17	34	69	−35	19	Relegated to Liga Alef

Source: rsssf.com

== Results ==
Home \ Away	BTA	BnY	HAR	HHA	HJE	HPT	HRG	HTA	HTI	MHA	MJA	MNE	MPT	MSH	MTA	STA
Beitar Tel Aviv	—	1–1	1–1	1–2	1–1	2–1	1–0	0–3	1–2	3–3	0–1	1–0	0–0	1–0	3–0	0–0
Bnei Yehuda	1–3	—	1–1	0–0	1–0	0–4	3–0	2–3	5–2	3–1	3–2	3–1	1–1	0–0	1–1	0–1
Hakoah Ramat Gan	3–0	5–0	—	1–0	1–0	2–1	0–1	2–2	0–0	1–3	3–1	1–0	1–2	1–1	3–1	5–1
Hapoel Haifa	1–0	2–2	0–0	—	1–1	0–3	2–1	1–0	5–1	2–0	2–4	7–0	4–1	3–0	1–2	2–0
Hapoel Jerusalem	0–0	0–4	1–1	2–1	—	1–1	2–1	1–1	2–1	3–2	0–0	3–0	1–1	0–1	1–0	1–2
Hapoel Petah Tikva	2–1	1–1	3–2	2–1	2–0	—	2–2	2–2	3–1	2–1	3–2	2–2	2–2	3–0	1–0	2–0
Hapoel Ramat Gan	1–0	0–0	0–0	5–0	0–0	3–1	—	2–1	2–0	1–2	1–4	1–0	1–0	3–0	0–0	1–1
Hapoel Tel Aviv	3–0	3–2	0–0	2–2	0–1	4–0	0–1	—	2–0	5–1	1–0	4–1	1–2	4–2	1–0	1–1
Hapoel Tiberias	2–3	0–5	0–2	0–0	2–1	1–0	3–1	0–0	—	1–1	6–3	1–2	1–0	2–0	0–1	1–1
Maccabi Haifa	4–0	1–2	0–1	1–1	3–0	1–2	3–1	1–2	3–0	—	2–1	3–4	1–1	1–0	1–2	0–1
Maccabi Jaffa	0–2	2–0	1–0	2–1	1–5	3–1	2–0	1–1	3–1	1–0	—	1–3	0–0	1–1	2–1	0–0
Maccabi Netanya	2–1	3–2	2–1	3–0	2–1	3–3	0–2	1–0	4–2	2–1	3–1	—	3–0	0–1	0–2	0–0
Maccabi Petah Tikva	0–3	3–2	0–0	0–3	1–3	0–2	1–0	0–1	6–0	1–1	3–1	5–1	—	4–1	2–1	1–1
Maccabi Sha'arayim	1–0	0–0	0–1	1–0	3–0	1–0	2–0	2–0	3–2	0–0	2–1	2–0	2–0	—	0–2	1–1
Maccabi Tel Aviv	1–2	2–0	1–2	2–3	1–1	3–1	1–2	2–0	4–1	0–0	3–2	4–1	3–0	0–0	—	2–0
Shimshon Tel Aviv	2–1	5–3	1–1	1–1	4–0	1–2	2–0	0–1	6–1	1–1	1–1	1–3	1–2	2–1	0–4	—

Legend: Blue = home team win; Yellow = draw; Red = away team win.
