= Carlos Bustamente (soccer) =

American soccer player

Personal information
- Place of birth: Arequipa, Peru
- Position: Striker

Senior career*
Years	Team	Apps	(Gls)
19??–1961	Brooklyn Italians		
1961–1966	Beitar Tel Aviv		
1966–1967	Beitar Ramla		

International career
1961	United States	1	(0)
- * Club domestic league appearances and goals

Carlos Bustamente was a soccer player who played as a forward. He played in Peru, Mexico, and Canada before moving to New York for the 1960–61 season with the Brooklyn Italians of the German American Soccer League. He was a guest player with New York Hakoah on a tour of Bermuda. Born in Peru, he earned one cap for the United States national team in a 2–0 loss to Colombia on February 5, 1961.

After playing for Universitorea Lima in Peru and Atlante F.C. in Mexico, Bustamente joined Montreal Canadian Alouettes FC for the 1959 season. In September, the team won their first Canadian title, defeating the Westminster Royals FC to lift the Carling's Red Cap Trophy. At the start of the 1960 season, Bustamente was again with the Montreal team, who were now renamed Montreal Concordia FC. In August of that year, he was one of five players suspended by the Canadian Football Soccer Association for leaving his club without permission (he had joined New York Colombo for a tour of Italy).

In March 1961 Bustamente, along with teammate Antonio Bonezzi, was brought to Israel in order to assist Beitar Tel Aviv with its bid to avoid relegation during the 1960–61 season. The two played one match for Beitar before they were suspended for ineligibility, as it was forbidden to field foreign players. Bustamente and Bonezzi were allowed to appear for beitar the following season.

Bustamente left for Beitar Ramla at the beginning of the 1966–68 season. On 1 January 1967 Bustamente was critically injured in a work-related accident which killed his Bonezzi, and subsequently retired. He married an Israeli woman and settled in Bat Yam.
