= Rachamim Talbi =

Israeli footballer

Rachamim Talbi רחמים טלבי
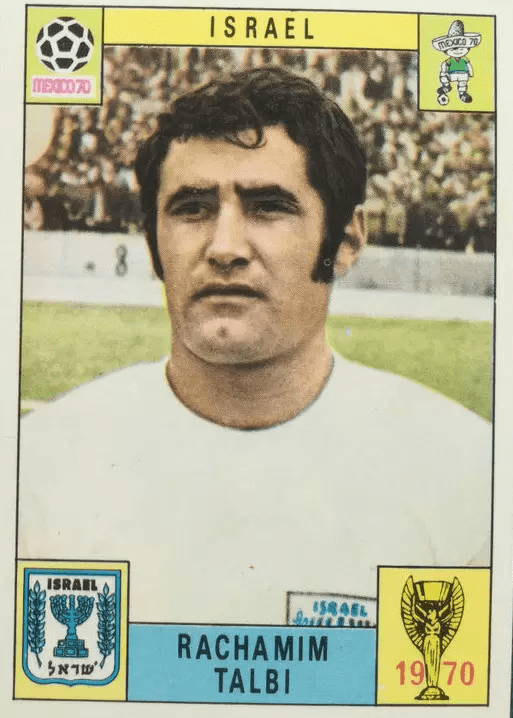
- Talbi at the 1970 FIFA World Cup

Personal information
- Full name: Rahamim Talbiev
- Date of birth: 17 May 1943 (age 83)
- Place of birth: Vidin, Bulgaria
- Height: 1.65 m (5 ft 5 in)
- Position: Forward

Senior career*
Years	Team	Apps	(Gls)
1962–1976	Maccabi Tel Aviv	340	(67)
1976–1977	Hapoel Marmorek	19	(1)

International career
1965–1973	Israel	46	(10)
- * Club domestic league appearances and goals

Rachamim Talbi (Hebrew: רחמים טלבי; born Rahamim Talbiev (Bulgarian: Рахамим Талбиев; born 17 May 1943 in Vidin, Bulgaria) is a former Israeli football forward, who played for the Israel national team between 1965 and 1973. He was part of the Israel squad for the 1970 World Cup.

At club level, Talbi played for Maccabi Tel Aviv and Hapoel Marmorek.
