= Ze'ev Seltzer =

Israeli footballer and manager

Ze'ev Zeltzer זאב זלצר
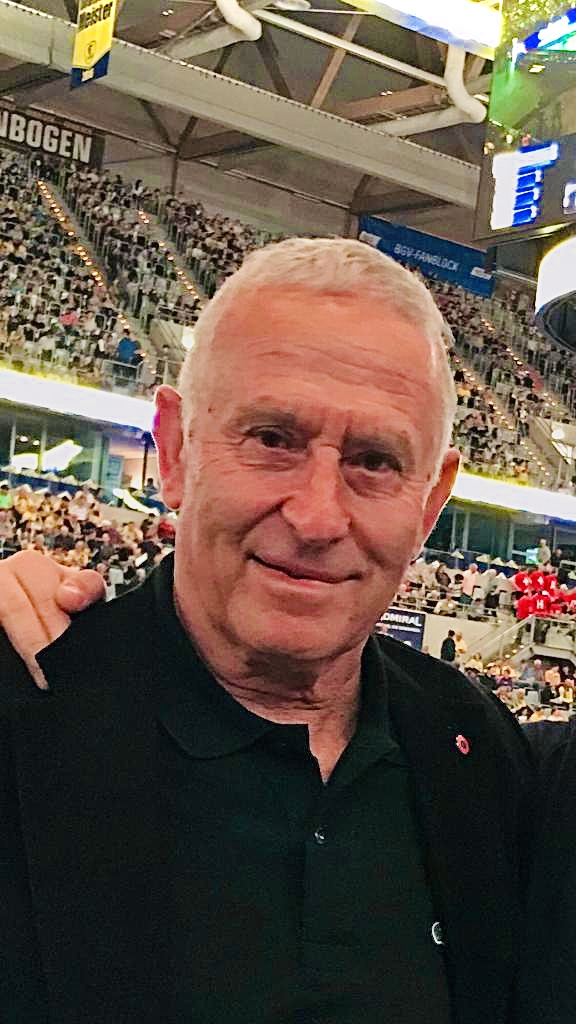

Personal information
- Date of birth: 9 February 1944 (age 82)
- Place of birth: Petah Tikva, Israel
- Position: Midfielder

Team information
- Current team: Hapoel Tel Aviv

Senior career*
Years	Team	Apps	(Gls)
1959–1976	Maccabi Petah Tikva	77	(?)

International career
1964/1970	Israel	2	(0)

Managerial career
- 1976–1977: Maccabi Petah Tikva
- 1977–1979: Bnei Yehuda
- 1979–1980: Maccabi Tel Aviv
- 1980–1981: Maccabi Yavne
- 1982–1984: Maccabi Netanya
- 1985–1989: Beitar Jerusalem
- 1989–1991: Hapoel Petah Tikva
- 1992–1993: Maccabi Petah Tikva
- 1993: Maccabi Ironi Ashdod
- 1994–1995: Maccabi Herzliya
- 1995–2006: Israel U-19
- 2008–2009: Hapoel Petah Tikva (general manager)
- 2010–2013: Hapoel Tel Aviv (youth director)
- 2013–2014: Beitar Tubruk (youth director)
- * Club domestic league appearances and goals

Ze'ev Zeltzer (Hebrew: זאב זלצר; born 9 February 1944) is an Israeli former footballer and current pundit. As a player, he represented Maccabi Petah Tikva and the Israel national team twice.

== Honours as Manager ==
- Israeli Second Division (1):
  - 1977-78
- Israel State Cup (1):
  - 1992
