= 1963–64 Liga Leumit =

Liga Leumit
- Season: 1963–64
- Champions: Hapoel Ramat Gan; 1st title
- Relegated: Hapoel Lod
- Top goalscorer: Israel Ashkenazi (21)

The 1963–64 Liga Leumit season saw Hapoel Ramat Gan win their first, and to date only championship. They were the first club to win the title the season after being promoted, having been in Liga Alef the previous season.

Maccabi Jaffa's Israel Ashkenazi was the league's top scorer with 21 goals, whilst Hapoel Lod were relegated at the end of their first season in the top division.

== Final table ==
Pos	Team	Pld	W	D	L	GF	GA	GD	Pts	Qualification or relegation
1	Hapoel Ramat Gan	28	17	6	5	52	33	+19	40	Champions
2	Maccabi Jaffa	28	15	9	4	51	26	+25	39	
3	Hapoel Petah Tikva	28	15	8	5	50	29	+21	38	
4	Hapoel Tel Aviv	28	12	10	6	48	34	+14	34	
5	Maccabi Tel Aviv	28	13	5	10	40	32	+8	31	
6	Hapoel Haifa	28	11	7	10	41	31	+10	29	
7	Maccabi Petah Tikva	28	12	4	12	46	39	+7	28	
8	Hakoah Ramat Gan	28	11	5	12	36	41	−5	27	
9	Shimshon Tel Aviv	28	7	10	11	44	46	−2	24	
10	Hapoel Tiberias	28	10	4	14	41	52	−11	24	
11	Maccabi Sha'arayim	28	10	4	14	29	44	−15	24	
12	Bnei Yehuda	28	8	7	13	36	46	−10	23	
13	Maccabi Haifa	28	8	7	13	31	47	−16	23	
14	Hapoel Jerusalem	28	6	8	14	27	46	−19	20	
15	Hapoel Lod	28	5	6	17	17	43	−26	16	Relegated to Liga Alef

Source: rsssf.com

== Results ==
Home \ Away	BnY	HAR	HHA	HJE	HLD	HPT	HRG	HTA	HTI	MHA	MJA	MSH	MPT	MTA	STA
Bnei Yehuda	—	1–1	2–1	1–0	3–0	0–0	0–0	1–3	2–1	1–1	1–1	1–1	1–3	2–4	2–0
Hakoah Ramat Gan	1–3	—	2–1	4–1	3–1	1–1	1–2	0–0	2–1	2–1	0–2	1–3	0–1	0–1	1–4
Hapoel Haifa	2–0	2–0	—	5–0	0–0	0–1	0–1	1–1	2–0	2–1	1–1	3–1	3–0	1–0	2–2
Hapoel Jerusalem	1–0	5–1	1–1	—	2–0	0–0	1–3	0–0	1–0	2–0	3–5	0–1	0–0	1–2	0–3
Hapoel Lod	0–1	1–3	0–1	2–0	—	1–3	0–3	2–2	1–1	0–1	0–1	1–0	1–1	2–1	1–0
Hapoel Petah Tikva	6–2	0–1	3–1	3–2	2–0	—	2–1	4–3	4–1	1–1	1–2	3–0	1–0	0–0	2–2
Hapoel Ramat Gan	2–1	2–1	3–2	3–1	1–1	3–2	—	1–1	1–0	1–0	1–3	2–0	1–0	1–0	2–0
Hapoel Tel Aviv	5–3	1–4	2–0	0–1	2–0	2–0	0–0	—	3–3	3–0	0–2	1–0	1–0	2–0	3–1
Hapoel Tiberias	2–1	2–0	1–0	3–3	1–0	0–2	1–5	1–5	—	6–2	2–3	1–0	3–1	1–4	4–0
Maccabi Haifa	3–1	1–1	1–1	1–0	2–1	2–2	2–3	1–0	1–2	—	2–2	3–0	1–4	1–1	1–0
Maccabi Jaffa	2–2	1–1	0–1	2–0	3–0	1–1	1–0	1–1	1–2	4–0	—	2–1	1–1	2–0	1–1
Maccabi Sha'arayim	1–0	0–1	3–7	0–0	0–0	0–2	3–2	3–1	1–0	1–0	1–0	—	4–1	2–0	0–1
Maccabi Petah Tikva	1–3	2–1	2–0	4–0	0–2	1–2	4–2	2–3	4–1	3–0	1–2	3–1	—	0–1	3–1
Maccabi Tel Aviv	1–0	1–2	2–0	1–1	1–0	1–0	3–3	1–1	3–1	0–2	1–0	6–0	1–2	—	2–1
Shimshon Tel Aviv	3–1	0–1	1–1	1–1	5–0	1–2	3–3	2–2	0–0	3–0	1–5	2–2	2–2	4–2	—

Legend: Blue = home team win; Yellow = draw; Red = away team win.
