= Hapoel Mahane Yehuda F.C. =

Israeli football club

Hapoel Mahane Yehuda
- Full name: Hapoel Mahane Yehuda Football Club
- Founded: 1949
- Ground: Zecharia Ratzabi Stadium
- Chairman: Yaron Garia
- Manager: Rami Zvi
- League: Liga Bet South A
- 2024–25: Liga Bet South A, 2nd
Home colours	Away colours

Hapoel Mahane Yehuda (Hebrew: הפועל מחנה יהודה) is an Israeli football club based in the Mahane Yehuda neighbourhood of Petah Tikva. The club currently plays in Liga Alef, the third level of Israeli football, though in the past they have played in the top division.

== History ==
The club was founded in 1949 as Mahane Yehuda Dror. When it joined the Israel Football Association in 1950, the current name was adopted.

In 1965 the club was promoted to Liga Leumit, then the top division. In their first season they finished 8th. However, the 1966–68 season saw the club finish second bottom of the division, resulting in relegation back to Liga Alef. Since then they have remained in the lower divisions.

Between 1990 and 1993 the club was managed by Eyal Lahman.

In the 2012–13 season, the club won Liga Bet South A division and made a return to Liga Alef after 36 years.

== Recent seasons ==
Season	League									Israel State Cup	Top league goalscorer(s)	
Season	Division	Pos	P	W	D	L	F	A	Pts	Israel State Cup	Name	Goals
1955–56	Liga Alef (2nd out of 4th)	6th	22	7	6	9	31	34	20	Not held	David Atuar	13
1956–57	Liga Alef (2nd out of 4th)	7th	22	8	6	6	35	30	22	Sixth Round	Avshalom Ratzabi	12
1957–58	Liga Alef (2nd out of 4th)	3rd	20	11	4	5	41	22	26	Sixth Round	Avshalom Ratzabi	28
1962–63	Liga Alef (2nd out of 4th)	5th	30	13	7	10	60	45	33	Fifth Round	Benny Ratzon	15
1964–65	Liga Alef North (2nd out of 4th)	1st	30	20	6	4	76	23	46	Fifth Round	Benny Ratzon	21
1965–66	Liga Leumit (1st out of 4th)	8th	30	11	9	10	36	38	31	Seventh Round	Zecharia Ratzabi	9
1966–68	Liga Leumit (1st out of 4th)	15th	60	13	23	24	51	82	49	1967 – Semi-finals; 1968 – Fifth Round	Zecharia Ratzabi	11
2006–07	Liga Bet South A (5th out of 6th)	8	30	9	9	12	37	44	36	First Round	Ido Ratzon	11
2007–08	Liga Bet South A (5th out of 6th)	2	30	21	4	5	76	25	67	Second Round	Tomer Shafat	18
2008–09	Liga Bet South A (5th out of 6th)	4	30	17	4	9	57	33	55	Fourth Round	Tomer Shafat	13
2009–10	Liga Bet South A (4th out of 5th)	11	30	10	6	14	30	48	36	Third Round	Ido Ratzon	7
2010–11	Liga Bet South A (4th out of 5th)	2	30	20	6	4	57	24	66	First Round	Tomer Shafat	14
2011–12	Liga Bet South A	3	30	13	8	7	44	30	47	First Round	Tomer Shafat	11
2012–13	Liga Bet South A	1st	30	22	5	3	81	21	71	First Round	Nethanel Va'aknin	27
2013–14	Liga Alef South	10	30	11	5	14	30	42	38	Seventh Round	Nethanel Va'aknin	11
2014–15	Liga Alef South	6	30	12	8	10	45	34	44	Fifth Round	Eliran Magol	9

== Honours ==
=== League ===
Honour	No.	Years
Second tier	1	1964–65
Third tier	2	1951–52, 1974–75
Fourth tier	1	2012–13
