= Dani Shmulevich-Rom =

Israeli footballer (1940–2021)

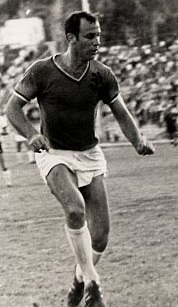

Personal information
- Full name: Daniel Shmulevich-Rom
- Date of birth: November 29, 1940
- Place of birth: Haifa, Mandatory Palestine
- Date of death: January 18, 2021 (aged 80)
- Position: Striker

Senior career*
Years	Team	Apps	(Gls)
1957–1973	Maccabi Haifa	283	(78)

International career
1960–1970	Israel	29	(0)
- * Club domestic league appearances and goals

Daniel "Dani" Shmulevich-Rom (Hebrew: דני שמולביץ-רום) was an Israeli footballer.

== Biography ==
Dani Shmulevich-Rom played for the Maccabi Haifa F.C. from 1957 to 1973. He was known by his ability to play several positions.

He died on 18 January 2021 after a long battle with cancer at the age of 80.
