= Hapoel Givatayim F.C. =

Football club

Hapoel Givatayim
- Full name: Hapoel Givatayim Football Club הפועל גבעתיים
- Founded: 1945; 1961 (Refounded)
- Dissolved: 1977
- Ground: HaMakhtesh Stadium, Givatayim
- 1976–77: Liga Bet South A, 16th (Relegated)

Hapoel Givatayim (Hebrew: הפועל גבעתיים) was an Israeli football club based in Givatayim. The club played three seasons in Liga Alef, then the second tier of Israeli football league system.

== History ==
The club was founded in 1945 and participated at the 1946 Palestine Cup, where they lost 1–6 on aggregate to Hapoel Tel Aviv, losing 0–6 in the first leg and inflicting a shock defeat on their opponents, 1–0 in the second leg. Hapoel Givatayim were due to play in 1946–47 Liga Bet, the last second-tier season of league football in the British Mandate of Palestine prior to the Israeli Declaration of Independence. However, Givatayim withdrew from the league and folded.

The club was re-established in 1961 as the reserve team of Hapoel Ramat Gan, which played home matches at HaMakhtesh Stadium, located in Givatayim.

In their first season following re-establishment, Givatayim won Liga Gimel Tel Aviv division and promoted to Liga Bet. In the following season, Givatayim finished fourth in Liga Bet South A division and promoted to Liga Alef. Thus, Hapoel Givatayim made two successive promotions since its re-establishment. In the 1963–64 season, Givatayim reached their best placing ever, which was fourth in Liga Alef South division. After seventh-place finish in the following season, Givatayim finished bottom in 1965–66 and dropped back to Liga Bet. The club suffered further relegation in the double season of 1966–68, this time to Liga Gimel, after finished bottom of Liga Bet South A division with only five points. Givatayim returned to Liga Bet in the 1972–73 season and remained five seasons in that league, until 1976–77 (when Liga Bet became the fourth tier of Israeli football), in which the club was eventually folded during the season.

== Honours ==
- Liga Gimel:
  - 1961–62, 1971–72
