= Menachem Ashkenazi =

Israeli football referee

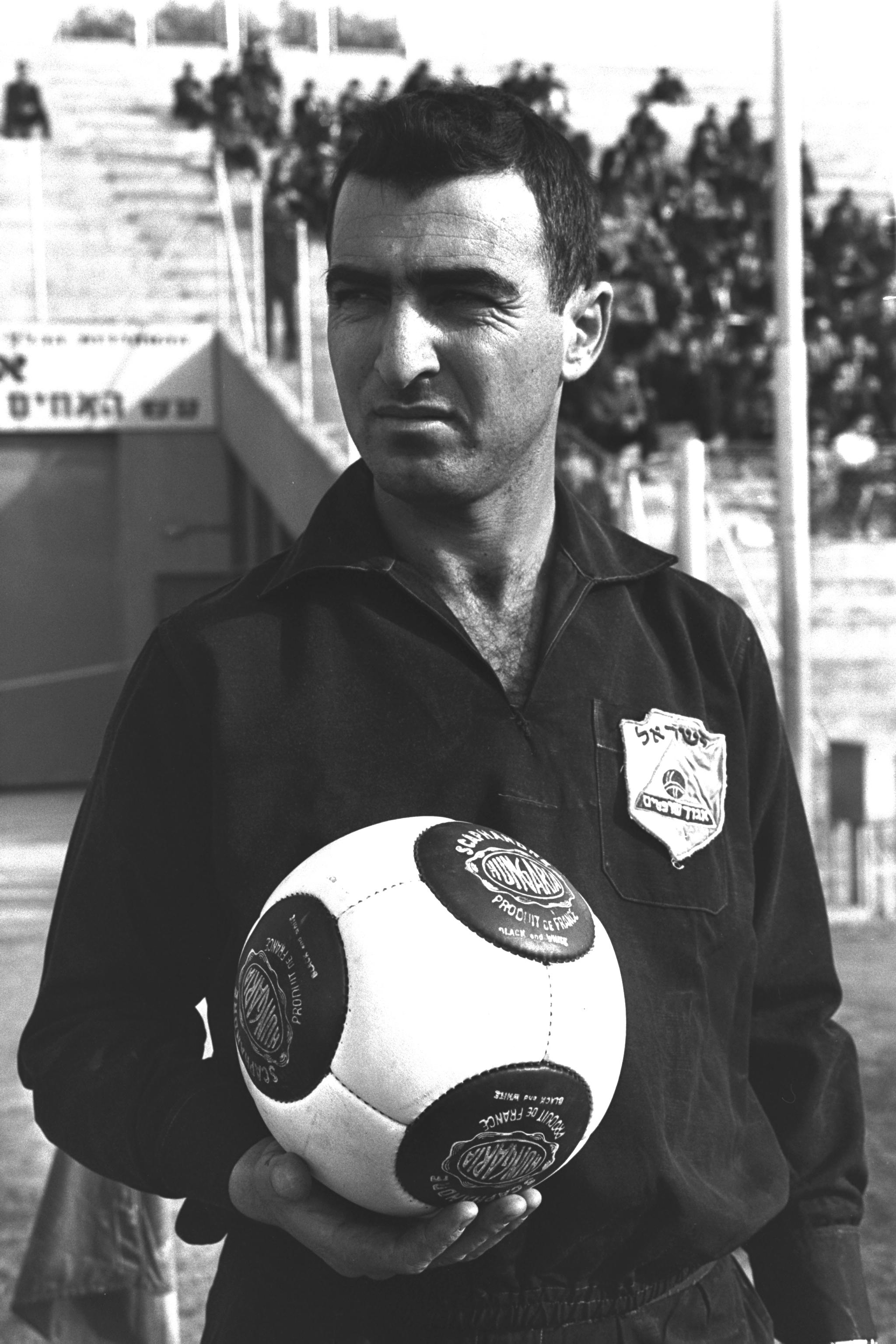
Menachem Ashkenazi

Menachem Ashkenazi (Hebrew: מנחם אשכנזי; 6 August 1934 – 13 November 2000) was an Israeli international football referee, born in Bulgaria, active during the 1960s and 1970s. He was the first Asian referee who officiated in a World Cup.

== Biography ==
Born in 1934 in a Jewish Sephardic family in Bulgaria, in 1936 he emigrated with his parents to Mandatory Palestine. Since his childhood he played soccer and distinguished himself at 16 as a player in the youth football team of the club Hapoel Petah Tikva. But following a severe fracture of his leg, he had to stop his career as a football player.

Ashkenazi had a long career as a FIFA official, supervising international matches as a referee or linesman during the period from 1961 to 1986. He officiated in the final of the 1964 Olympic tournament (the only Israeli referee ever to do so) and also in the 1966 FIFA World Cup. He was in charge in one of the most memorable matches of that World Cup, Portugal's 5–3 win over North Korea in the quarterfinal.

His other international competitions as a referee included 1966 and 1978 World Cup qualifiers.

== See also ==
- List of Jews in sports (non-players)
