= Hapoel Nahliel F.C. =

Israeli football club

Hapoel Nahliel Football Club (Hebrew: מועדון כדורגל הפועל נחליאל) was an Israeli football club based in the Nahliel neighborhood of Hadera. The club played 11 seasons in Liga Alef, then the second tier of Israeli football league system.

== History ==
Several attempts were made to organize a club in Nahliel, the first in 1946, which resulted in the closing of the club during the 1947–1949 Palestine war. A second attempt, in the mid-1950s collapsed due to financial difficulties, and the third attempt was made at the beginning of the 1956–57 season. The club was purchased in 1998 by Yoav kobi, then chairmen of Hapoel Givat Olga, and the teams were merged. The merged team was further merged with Hapoel Hadera in 1999.

=== League performance ===
The club promoted to Liga Bet at the end of 1958–59 season, and promoted further, to Liga Alef after finishing top of division North B of Liga Bet. Its best position in the second tier was 4th, coming at the end of 1968–69 season. Eventually, when Liga Artzit was formed, at the end of the 1975–76 season, the club was placed in Liga Alef, which was designated as the third tier of the Israeli football league system. Three seasons later the club finished second-bottom and dropped to Liga Bet. The club managed to return to Liga Alef for the 1982–83 season, but finished bottom and dropped once again to Liga Bet, and never climbed back.

=== Cup performance ===
The club first made an impression in the State Cup in 1958–59, when it made the sixth round as a Liga Gimel club (round of 32), where it was beaten by Hapoel Petah Tikva 1–7, a feat it repeated the next two seasons, 1960–61, losing 1–2 to Hapoel Tel Aviv, and 1961–62, losing 3–4 to Hapoel Ramla.

The club's best achievement in the cup came in 1963–64, when progressed to the quarter-finals, where it lost to eventual cup-winner, Maccabi Tel Aviv 0–2.

== Honours ==
=== League ===
Honour	No.	Years
Third tier	1	1962–63
Fourth tier	1	1981–82
