= Harari Tel Aviv F.C. =

Harari Tel Aviv
- Full name: Harari Tel Aviv Football Club הררי תל אביב
- Founded: 1923; 1943 (Refounded); 1959 (Refounded)
- Dissolved: 1965
- 1964–65: Liga Alef South, 16th (Relegated)

Harari Tel Aviv (Hebrew: הררי תל אביב, lit. "Mountainous" Tel Aviv) was an Israeli football club based in Tel Aviv.

== History ==
The original club was founded in 1923 by Mountain Jews, which immigrated to Mandatory Palestine and settled in Tel Aviv. The club was named after its origins, the Caucasus Mountains, as Harari means "Mountainous" in the Hebrew language. The club's activity was ceased in 1929 due to outbreak of the 1929 Palestine riots, and lack of funds.

The club was reformed in 1943 and played at the second-tier league of the Palestine League in the 1943–44 and 1944–45 seasons. However, the club was folded afterwards, due to financial problems.

After the Israeli Declaration of Independence, the club was reformed again in 1959 as Hapoel Harari Yad Eliyahu and entered the league competitions at Liga Gimel. Harari withdrew from Hapoel association prior to the 1961–62 season and became independent club once more, returning to its original name. At the end of that season, Harari beat Hapoel Dimona 6–1 in the promotion play-offs for Liga Gimel clubs and were promoted to Liga Bet.

The club joined Beitar association, prior to the 1963–64 season, and was renamed Beitar Harari Tel Aviv. At the end of the season, Harari finished runners-up in Liga Bet South A division and promoted to Liga Alef, the second tier of Israeli football at the time. However, the club's spell in Liga Alef lasted only one season, as they finished bottom of the South division at the 1964–65 season, winning only two games, and relegated back to Liga Bet. In the following season, the club merged with Liga Gimel club, Beitar Bat Yam, and became known as Beitar Harari Bat Yam, which was the full name of the club until the end of the 1968–69 season, in which they were relegated to Liga Gimel. In the following season at Liga Gimel, Beitar Bat Yam continued as a separate entity, and the name of Harari was dropped.
