= Beitar Lod F.C. =

Beitar Lod
- Full name: Beitar Lod Football Club בית"ר לוד
- Founded: 1952
- Dissolved: 1998
- Ground: Lod Municipal Stadium, Lod
Home colours	Away colours

Beitar Lod (Hebrew: בית"ר לוד) was an Israeli football club based in Lod. The club played six seasons in Liga Alef, then the second tier of Israeli football league system.

== History ==
The club was founded in 1952 and joined Liga Gimel. The original team consisted of players who were new immigrants to Israel from North African countries, and have already played football in their countries of origin. In the 1957–58 season, after young players replaced the veterans which retired, the club won the Middle division and was set to compete in the Promotion play-offs. However, the club remained in Liga Gimel after the Israel Football Association decided to abandon all the leagues in the country before the end of the season, due to suspicions of match-fixing.

At the end of the following season, the club was promoted to Liga Bet, as the third tier was expanded to 64 teams. After five seasons playing at the third tier, the club won Liga Bet South A division in the 1963–64 season and made historic promotion to the second tier, Liga Alef. The club's best placing in the second tier, was the tenth place in Liga Alef South division, which was achieved in the 1969–70 season. However, in the following season, Beitar finished bottom and relegated to Liga Bet, after six seasons playing at the second tier. In the 1975–76 season, the club finished bottom of Liga Bet South A division, and relegated to Liga Gimel, which became the fifth tier, following the creation of Liga Artzit. The club remained in the lower tiers of Israeli football, mostly in Liga Bet (where the club returned in the 1979–80 season), and folded in 1998.

== Honours ==
=== League ===
Honour	No.	Years
Third tier	1	1963–64
Fourth tier	1	1957–58
Fifth tier	2	1978–79, 1986–87
