= Hapoel Kfar Blum F.C. =

Hapoel Kfar Blum
- Full name: Hapoel Kfar Blum Football Club מועדון כדורגל הפועל כפר בלום
- Founded: 1959; 66 years ago
- Dissolved: 1974; 51 years ago
- Ground: Kfar Blum Ground
Home colours	Away colours

Hapoel Kfar Blum Football Club (Hebrew: מועדון כדורגל הפועל כפר בלום) was an Israeli football club based at Kfar Blum. The club was founded in 1959 and played five seasons in Liga Alef, then the second tier of Israeli football league system.

== History ==
The club was founded in 1959, after Hapoel Hulyot, a club based in Sde Nehemia, a nearby kibbutz, which included members from Kfar Blum ceased operations at the start of the 1959–60 season.

The club promoted to Liga Alef at the end 1962–63 season after finishing as runners-up, and remained at the second tier until it finished bottom at the end of 1968–69 season. A season later the club withdrew from the Liga Bet and dropped to Liga Gimel, where the club continued to play until withdrawing from the league altogether, choosing to play in the regional leagues.

== Honours ==
- Liga Bet
  - Runners-Up: 1962–63 (1)
- Liga Gimel
  - 1960–61 (1)
