= Beitar Tel Aviv F.C. =

Israeli football club

Beitar Tel Aviv
- Full name: Beitar Tel Aviv Football Club מועדון כדורגל בית״ר תל אביב
- Founded: 1934; 2023 (Refounded)
- Ground: Bloomfield Stadium, Tel Aviv
- League: Liga Bet South A
- 2024–25: Liga Bet South A, 9th
Home colours	Away colours

Beitar Tel Aviv Football Club (Hebrew: מועדון כדורגל בית״ר תל אביב) was an Israeli football club based from Tel Aviv. The club merged in 2000 with Shimshon Tel Aviv to create Beitar Shimshon Tel Aviv, and later, after the merge came apart, merged with Ironi Ramla to create Beitar Tel Aviv Ramla.

On 22 May 2019, Ramla withdrew the merger and the club merged with Maccabi Ironi Bat Yam, and the club changed its name to Beitar Tel Aviv Bat Yam.

== History ==
The club were founded as a youth team, but soon began to compete in adult leagues, advancing within three years to the top division. Their first success came in 1940, when they won the Palestine Cup, beating Maccabi Tel Aviv 3–1 in the final. Two years later, they won the cup again, setting a record for the highest score in the final, when they beat Maccabi Haifa 12–1.

The club faced off Egyptian Al Ahly SC in 1943. 3 total matches were played, with Beitar Tel Aviv winning the first match and losing the other 2.

In 1945 the club won its division in the War League, but the deciding championship match against Hapoel Tel Aviv, winner of the other division was never played and no one champion was set. Nowadays the IFA recognize both clubs as champions for this season.

On 6 May 1945 the club played visiting team Hajduk Split and recorded a 4–2 victory. The Yugoslav team have beaten Maccabi Tel Aviv 7–2, and Beitar's victory was held as a great feat.

The club reached the cup final again in 1947, playing Maccabi Tel Aviv. The tempestuous match was abandoned with Maccabi leading 3–2 after Beitar seemed to have scored a goal, which wasn't given, and the crowd stormed the pitch.

Beitar Tel Aviv were founder members of the Israeli League in 1949, finishing 6th out of 13 in the 1949–50 season. Despite finishing second from bottom in 1953–54, the club avoided relegation as the top division was expanded to 14 teams. The following season they finished 5th, with Nisim Elmaliah the division's top scorer with 30 goals. Despite only finishing 7th out of 12 in 1955–56, Beitar had both the division's top scorers; Avraham Levi and Michael Michaelov with 16 goals each.

In 1960–61, the club finished bottom of the division, and were relegated to Liga Alef. They remained in the second tier until 1963–64, when they were promoted as champions. After finishing one place above relegation in 1964–65, Beitar were demoted again after finishing bottom a year later. However, they bounced back in 1968–69 as Liga Alef champions.

The club reached the State Cup final for the fourth time in 1977, but were beaten 1–0 by Maccabi Tel Aviv.

After several years in mid-table, the early 1980s saw the club develop a yo-yo pattern. Relegated in 1979–80, the club were promoted in 1980–81, before being relegated immediately, but then bouncing back up in 1982–83. Two years later the club were relegated again, before bouncing back immediately yet again.

The 1988–89 season was the club's best yet in the top flight, finishing 4th, and was bettered two years later, when a third-place finish was achieved.

The 1992–93 season saw another relegation and another immediate return in 1993–94. The relegation in 1995–96 was their final appearance in the top flight. At the end of the 1998–99 season they were relegated to the third division. At the end of the 1999–2000 season the club merged with fellow Liga Artzit Tel Aviv side Shimshon Tel Aviv.

== Honours ==
=== League ===
Honour	No.	Years
Israeli Championships	1	1944–45
Second tier	1	1939, 1963–64, 1968–68, 1980–81, 1982–83

=== Cup competitions ===
Honour	No.	Years
Israel State Cup	2	1940, 1942
Toto Cup (Second tier)	1	1993–94

== Records ==
- Most league goals in a season: 30, Nisim Elmaliah, Liga Alef 1954–55
