= Hapoel Netanya F.C. =

Hapoel Netanya
- Full name: Hapoel Netanya Football Club מועדון כדורגל הפועל נתניה
- Founded: 1937
- Dissolved: 1982
- Ground: Hapoel Stadium, Netanya
- 1981–82: Liga Bet North B, 4th

Hapoel Netanya Football Club (Hebrew: מועדון כדורגל הפועל נתניה) was a football club based in Netanya, Israel.

== History ==
The club played their first match at 6 February 1937, in a friendly against Hapoel Kfar Yona, which ended in 1–1 draw.

The club played in the second tier from 1949 to 1955, 1959–1960, 1964–1972 and 1973–1979. The biggest accomplishment of the club came at the end of the 1974–75 season when they finished 4th in the second division. They got relegated at the end of the 1978–79 season. At the end of the 1980–81 season, they got relegated to Liga Bet, the fourth tier of Israeli football.

After major financial problems, the club players were released, and the club dissolved at 15 October 1982.

== Honours ==
=== League ===
Honour	No.	Years
Premier Division	2	1932–1933, 1938–1939
Third Division	2	1963–1964, 1972–1973
