= List of Israel State Cup winners =

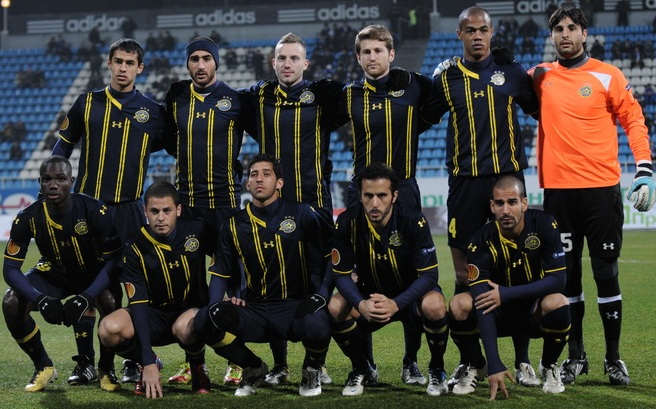
Maccabi Tel Aviv (2011 team pictured) have won the Israel State Cup on a record 25 occasions.

Since the Eretz Israel Football Association was founded in 1928, it has organised a nationwide knockout cup competition almost every football season. This cup was originally held in Mandatory Palestine and named the People's Cup, but when Israel became independent in 1948, the tournament was renamed the Israel State Cup. "Eretz" was dropped from the association's name at the same time.

Hapoel Be'er Sheva are the current Israel State Cup holders, having beaten Beitar Jerusalem 2–0 in the final for their fourth title.

Scheduling was initially inconsistent, but the State Cup has been a regular fixture in the Israeli football calendar since the start of the 1961–62 football season. It involves professional and amateur clubs of all standards playing against each other, creating the possibility for "minnows" to become "giant-killers" by eliminating top clubs from the tournament. Five teams have reached the final while playing in a lower division, but all have been defeated apart from Hapoel Ramat Gan, who won the cup final while a second-tier club in 2003. British police and military teams took part in large numbers during the Mandate Period, and one, British Police, won the competition in 1932. Bnei Sakhnin, the 2004 final victors, are the only side from a mostly Arab-Israeli town to have lifted the cup.

Maccabi Tel Aviv have a record 25 cup titles, followed by Hapoel Tel Aviv, who have 16, including two unmatched runs of three consecutively (1937 to 1939, and 2010 to 2012). The sustained good performance of Beitar Jerusalem, the next most successful team in terms of State Cup wins with seven, is a relatively recent occurrence compared to the two major Tel Aviv clubs: Maccabi and Hapoel Tel Aviv have been consistently successful throughout the cup's history, but Beitar Jerusalem only reached their first finals in the 1970s. Hapoel Kfar Saba are presently the only club with more than one final appearance to hold an undefeated record in these matches, having won the cup final three times, every time they have reached it. By contrast, three-time finalists Shimshon Tel Aviv have yet to lift the trophy. The most decisive cup final victory was in 1942, when Beitar Tel Aviv beat Maccabi Haifa 12–1.

== Winners ==
Key
^{†}	Winners also won the National League Championship during the same season.
^{‡}	Winners also won the League Cup during the same season.
^{§}	Winners also won both the League and League Cup during the same season.
^{*}	Team was playing outside the top division of the national league.
(United Kingdom)	Denotes a team of British servicemen.
(aet)	After extra time
(pen.)	Penalty shoot-out
(number of cup wins)	A running tally of the total number of cup titles won by each club is kept in brackets.

=== 1922–27: Unofficial National Cups ===
Starting in 1922, unofficial cup competitions were held in Mandatory Palestine on an annual, national basis under the sponsorship of Britain's military garrison there. The first national cup title was won by Lancashire Troop Haifa, and the following year a team representing the Royal Air Force detachment at Ramla won the final. The next four editions of this competition were won by a Royal Air Force team drawn from across the Mandate, which beat the Ramla side in the 1927 decider. As these cups pre-date the existence of a national football association, they are not considered official by the Israel Football Association. Between 1923 and 1927 there was also a national cup organised by the Maccabi organisation, the Magen Shimshon, but this only included Maccabi clubs.

Unofficial Cup winners (1922 to 1927)
Season	Winners
1922	(United Kingdom) South Lancashire Regiment Haifa
1923	(United Kingdom) Royal Air Force Ramla
1924	(United Kingdom) Royal Air Force Palestine
1925	(United Kingdom) Royal Air Force Palestine
1926	(United Kingdom) Royal Air Force Palestine
1927	(United Kingdom) Royal Air Force Palestine

Magen Shimshon winners (1923 to 1927)
Season	Winners	Result	Runners-up
1923	Maccabi Nes Tziona	2–0	Maccabi Haifa
1924	Maccabi Nes Tziona	1–0	Maccabi Hasmonean Jerusalem
1925	Maccabi Tel Aviv	7–0	Maccabi Avshalom Petah Tikva
1926	Maccabi Tel Aviv	6–1	Maccabi Hasmonean Jerusalem
1927	Maccabi Haifa	4–0	Maccabi Hasmonean Jerusalem

=== 1928–47: People's Cup ===
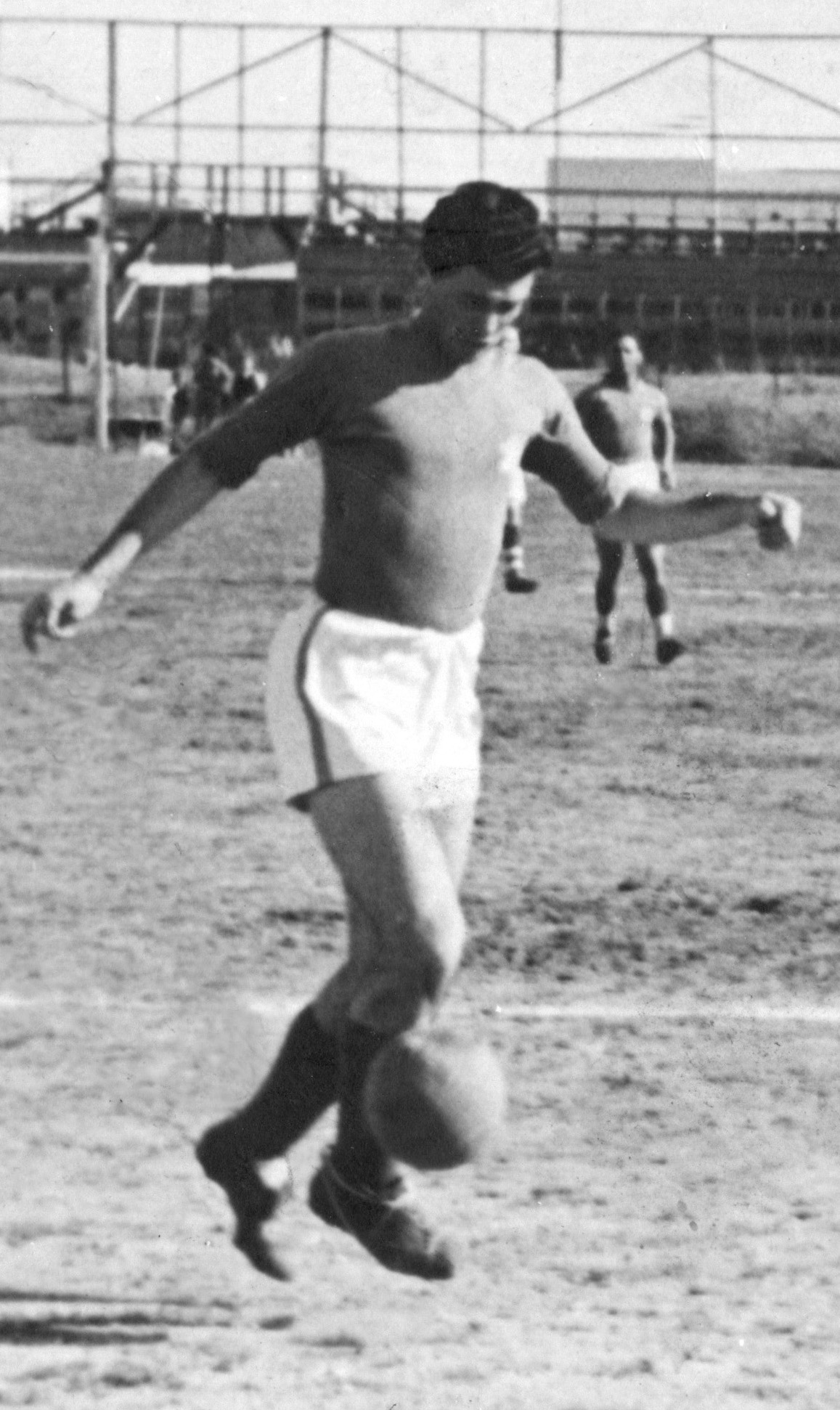
Shmuel Ginzburg played for Maccabi Tel Aviv from 1936 to 1943 and contributed to the team's cup win in 1941.

The Eretz Israel Football Association was founded in August 1928, and the first officially sanctioned national tournament was held the same year as the "People's Cup". The first People's Cup final ended with Hapoel Tel Aviv and Maccabi Hasmonean Jerusalem sharing the trophy following an incident involving an ineligible Hapoel player. (Note: The 1928 final finished 2–0 to Hapoel Tel Aviv, but afterwards it was discovered by Eretz Israel Football Association (IFA) authorities that an ineligible player had been fielded by Hapoel. The cup was shared by Hapoel and Maccabi Hasmonean Jerusalem, the defeated finalists, first spending six months in Tel Aviv, then the same amount of time in Jerusalem.) Tel Aviv clubs dominated the cup during this period, with Beitar, Hapoel and Maccabi Tel Aviv winning all but two of the annual competitions. The Jerusalem-based British Police side won in 1932 and Maccabi Petah Tikva lifted the cup three years later. During this period Hapoel Tel Aviv won three consecutive cup titles (1937 to 1939), which remains a record to this day. At the end of the Mandate period, Maccabi Tel Aviv were the most successful team in the national cup, with six final wins; their city rivals Hapoel followed with five. The People's Cup trophy was stolen at the end of the chaotic 1947 final and has never been recovered. (Note: With Maccabi Tel Aviv 3–2 ahead of their city rivals Beitar in the 1947 final, Beitar had an apparent equalising goal disallowed by the referee with two minutes left on the clock. A violent pitch invasion took place, and in the confusion Beitar player Yom-Tov Mensharov stole the cup and escaped the stadium with it, undetected by authorities. He then somehow lost the trophy himself in unclear circumstances. What was certain was that the cup was gone and that the final could not go on. The IFA awarded Maccabi a 3–0 victory, and promised to present them with the cup when it was found. However, this pledge has so far proved futile as the trophy has never been recovered. A replacement was commissioned by the IFA when the Israel State Cup came into being after independence in 1948. The original cup was reportedly photographed intact in Petah Tikva in 1992, but its present whereabouts are unknown.)

People's Cup winners from 1928 to 1942 and 1946–1947
Season	Winners	Result	Runners-up
1928	Hapoel Tel Aviv (1) and Maccabi Hasmonean Jerusalem (1)	Shared	—
1929	Maccabi Tel Aviv (1)	4–0	Maccabi Hasmonean Jerusalem
1930	Maccabi Tel Aviv (Team B) (2)	2–1	(United Kingdom) Northamptonshire Regiment
1931	Not Held		
1932	(United Kingdom) British Police (1)^{†}	Walkover (Note: The 1932 final was abandoned with the score 1–0 to Hapoel Haifa, when the Haifa club's players walked off the field in protest at a penalty kick awarded to British Police. The police were awarded the cup by walkover.)	Hapoel Haifa
1933	Maccabi Tel Aviv (3)	1–0	Hapoel Tel Aviv
1934	Hapoel Tel Aviv (2)^{†}	3–2	Maccabi Tel Aviv
1935	Maccabi Petah Tikva (1)	1–0	Hakoah Tel Aviv
1936	Not Held		
1937	Hapoel Tel Aviv (3)	3–0	Hapoel HaDarom Tel Aviv
1938	Hapoel Tel Aviv (4)^{†}	2–1	Maccabi Tel Aviv
1939	Hapoel Tel Aviv (5)	2–1	Maccabi Petah Tikva
1940	Beitar Tel Aviv (1)	3–1	Maccabi Tel Aviv
1941	Maccabi Tel Aviv (4)	2–1	Hapoel Tel Aviv
1942	Beitar Tel Aviv (2)	12–1	Maccabi Haifa
1943–45	Not Official		
1946	Maccabi Tel Aviv (5)	3–1 / 3–0	Hapoel Rishon LeZion
1947	Maccabi Tel Aviv (6)^{†}	3–0	Beitar Tel Aviv

==== 1943–45: Unofficial "War Cup" ====
In the 1943 and 1944–45 seasons, during the Second World War, a version of the competition called the "War Cup" was held which was not considered official by the Israel Football Association. Despite this, the People's Cup trophy was awarded after the 1943 final to the victorious team of British artillerymen, Gunners. The 1944–45 War Cup was controversial both at its beginning and at its end—it was boycotted from the start by clubs of the Beitar organisation and its final match, held on 13 January 1945, was abandoned. With Hapoel Tel Aviv leading Hapoel Petah Tikva 1–0 with one minute remaining, one of the Hapoel Petah Tikva players began targeting the referee with abusive and obscene language. The official sent the offending player off, but he vehemently refused to leave the pitch, causing significant disruption. The referee abandoned the match and declared the 1–0 scoreline final. Nowadays, the IFA recognize these cup editions as part of the competition's history.

Unofficial "War Cup" winners from 1943 to 1944
Season	Winners	Result	Runners-up
1943	(United Kingdom) Gunners	7–1	Hapoel Jerusalem
1944	Hapoel Tel Aviv	1–0	Hapoel Petah Tikva

=== 1948–present: Israel State Cup ===
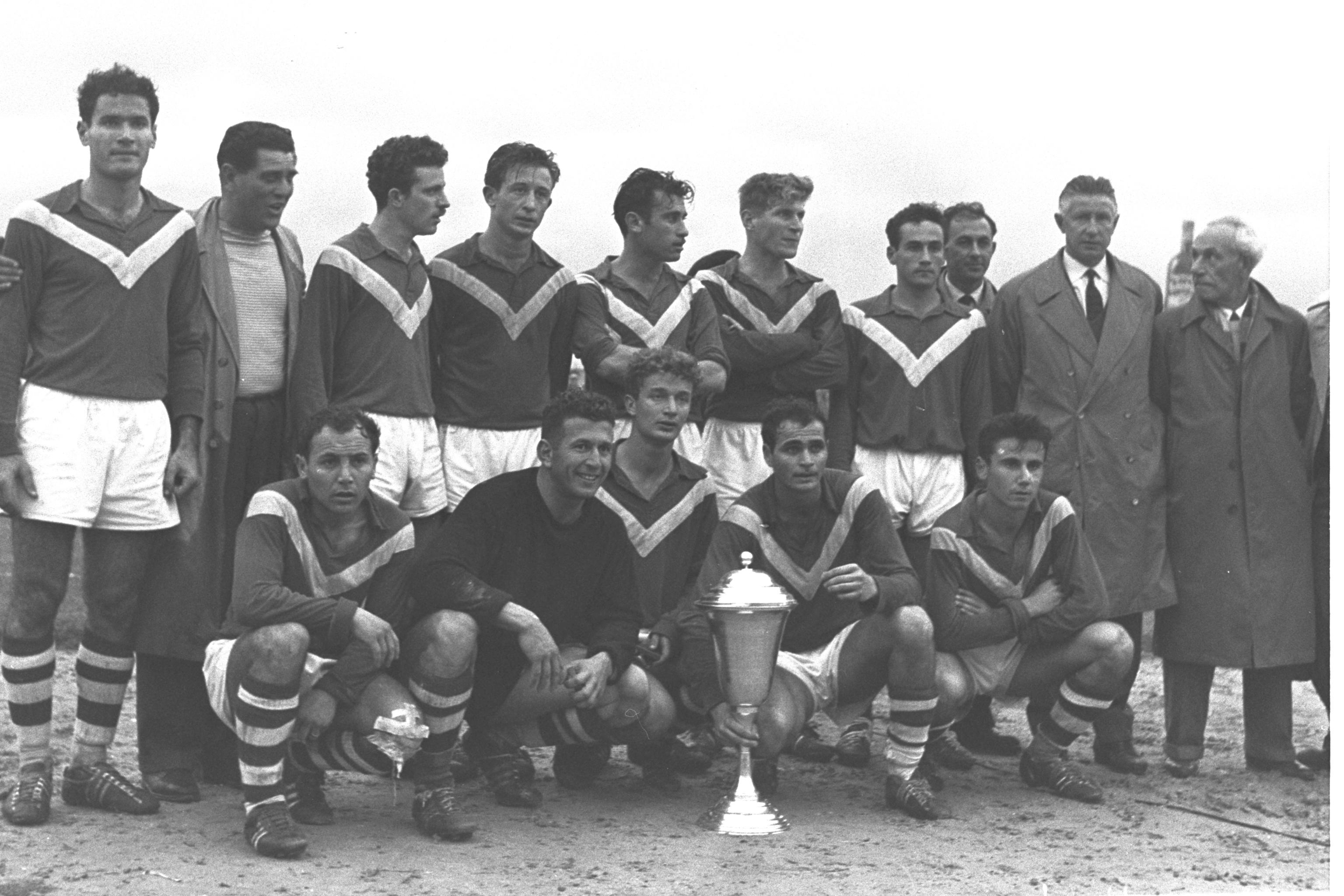
Hapoel Tel Aviv players and staff before the 1961 final, which they won 2–1 against Hapoel Petah Tikva

With the termination of the British Mandate and the foundation of the State of Israel in 1948, the association dropped "Eretz" from its name, renamed its cup competition the Israel State Cup and commissioned a new trophy. The scheduling of the cup was initially sporadic, and several editions took well over a year to complete—over the 15 seasons between 1951–52 and 1964–65 only 11 competitions took place. Two clubs from Haifa, Hapoel and Maccabi, won their first cup finals in successive years, starting with Maccabi Haifa in 1963. Bnei Yehuda Tel Aviv first lifted the trophy in 1968, and Hakoah Ramat Gan did the same a year later. Maccabi Tel Aviv lifted the cup three times during the 1960s, and brought their overall tally to 14 with a further final win in 1970.

Bnei Yehuda became the first club from outside the top division to reach the final in 1978, but they were unable to overcome league champions Maccabi Netanya, who lifted the cup for the first time with this victory. Three more teams won their first cup titles during the 1970s: Hapoel Kfar Saba, and Beitar and Hapoel Jerusalem. Two small-town clubs, Hapoel Yehud and Hapoel Lod, won the cup for the first time in 1982 and 1984 respectively, but otherwise the 1980s cup finals were the domain of sides from the cities of Jerusalem and Tel Aviv. Maccabi Haifa won four cup finals during the 1990s, while Maccabi Tel Aviv won two, bringing their total to 19 by the year 2000. Hapoel Be'er Sheva's cup final victory in 1997 was their first.

The 21st century began with two more cup titles for Maccabi Tel Aviv, before two consecutive seasons saw respective firsts for the Israel State Cup. In 2003 Hapoel Ramat Gan became the first side to win the cup final from outside the top division, and a year later Bnei Sakhnin became the first club from a mostly Arab-Israeli town to lift the trophy. Three more second-tier clubs, Hapoel Haifa, Maccabi Herzliya and Hapoel Ashkelon, reached the final in 2004, 2005 and 2007 respectively, but none of these won the deciding match. Following Bnei Sakhnin's victory teams from Jerusalem and Tel Aviv reclaimed dominance—Maccabi Tel Aviv lifted the cup in 2005, Beitar Jerusalem won two consecutive titles (2008 and 2009) and Hapoel Tel Aviv twice (2006 and 2007), and then three times consecutively from 2010 to 2012. Hapoel Ramat Gan won the cup for the second time in 2013, this time as a top-flight club. On 9 May 2018, Hapoel Haifa won the cup, proving once and for all that Haifa is red.

Israel State Cup finals since 1948
Season	Date	Winners	Result	Runners-up
1949–51	Not Completed (Note: The competition started during the 1948–49, in Spring 1949, but was delayed due to appeals over quarter-final matches. The appeals were left standing until January 1951, when the competition resumed with a quarter-final match between Maccabi Petah Tikva and Hapoel Tel Aviv. Three further matches were played during February 1951, but no more matches were played and the tournament was abandoned at the end of the 1950-51 football season.)			
1951–52	7 June 1952	Maccabi Petah Tikva (2)	1–0	Maccabi Tel Aviv
1952–53	Not Held (Note: The 1953–54 Israel State Cup began in March 1953 and the competition was carried over to the next season.)			
1953–54	3 July 1954	Maccabi Tel Aviv (7)^{†}	4–0	Maccabi Netanya
1954–55	19 November 1955 (Note: The competition started on 22 January 1955 and was carried over to the next season)	Maccabi Tel Aviv (8)	3–1	Hapoel Petah Tikva
1955–56	Not Held (Note: The competition started on 11 February 1956 and was carried over to the next season)			
1956–57	6 July 1957	Hapoel Petah Tikva (1)	2–1	Maccabi Jaffa
1957–58	30 September 1958 (Note: The competition started on 12 October 1957 and was carried over to the next season)	Maccabi Tel Aviv (9)^{†}	2–0	Hapoel Haifa
1958–59	19 November 1959 (Note: The competition started on 6 December 1958 and was carried over to the next season)	Maccabi Tel Aviv (10)	4–3	Hapoel Petah Tikva
1959–60	Not Held (Note: The competition started on 30 February 1960 and was carried over to the next season)			
1960–61	1 February 1961	Hapoel Tel Aviv (6)	2–1	Hapoel Petah Tikva
1961–62	27 March 1962 (Note: The competition started on 12 February 1961 and was carried over to the next season)	Maccabi Haifa	0–0	Maccabi Tel Aviv
1961–62	7 May 1962	Maccabi Haifa	5–2 (R)	Maccabi Tel Aviv
1962–63	27 May 1963 (Note: The competition started on 24 March 1962 and was carried over to the next season)	Hapoel Haifa (1)	1–0	Maccabi Haifa
1963–64	30 September 1964 (Note: The competition started on 21 September 1963 and was carried over to the next season)	Maccabi Tel Aviv (11)	1–1 (a.e.t.)	Hapoel Haifa
1963–64	10 October 1964	Maccabi Tel Aviv (11)	1–1 (a.e.t.) (R)	Hapoel Haifa
1963–64	8 December 1964	Maccabi Tel Aviv (11)	2–1 (R)	Hapoel Haifa
1964–65	29 June 1965	Maccabi Tel Aviv (12)	2–1	Bnei Yehuda Tel Aviv
1965–66	8 June 1966	Hapoel Haifa (2)	2–1	Shimshon Tel Aviv
1966–67	1 November 1967 (Note: The competition started on 17 September 1966 and was carried over to the next season)	Maccabi Tel Aviv (13)	2–1	Hapoel Tel Aviv
1967–68	12 June 1968	Bnei Yehuda Tel Aviv (1)	1–0	Hapoel Petah Tikva
1968–69	25 June 1969	Hakoah Ramat Gan (1)	1–0	Maccabi Sha'arayim
1969–70	7 October 1970 (Note: The competition started on 20 September 1969 and was carried over to the next season due to the national team participation in the 1970 FIFA World Cup.)	Maccabi Tel Aviv (14)^{†}	2–1	Maccabi Netanya
1970–71	16 June 1971	Hakoah Ramat Gan (2)	2–1	Maccabi Haifa
1971–72	26 September 1972 (Note: The competition started during the 1971–72 season and was carried over to the next season)	Hapoel Tel Aviv (7)	1–0	Hapoel Jerusalem
1972–73	20 June 1973	Hapoel Jerusalem (1)	2–0	Hakoah Ramat Gan
1973–74	12 June 1974	Hapoel Haifa (3)	1–0 (a.e.t.)	Hapoel Petah Tikva
1974–75	14 May 1975	Hapoel Kfar Saba (1)	3–1	Beitar Jerusalem
1975–76	16 June 1976	Beitar Jerusalem (1)	2–1	Maccabi Tel Aviv
1976–77	1 June 1977	Maccabi Tel Aviv (15)^{†}	1–0	Beitar Tel Aviv
1977–78	24 May 1978	Maccabi Netanya (1)^{†}	2–1	Bnei Yehuda Tel Aviv^{*}
1978–79	6 June 1979	Beitar Jerusalem (2)	2–1	Maccabi Tel Aviv
1979–80	4 June 1980	Hapoel Kfar Saba (2)	4–1	Maccabi Ramat Amidar
1980–81	27 May 1981	Bnei Yehuda Tel Aviv (2)	2–2 (a.e.t.) 4–3 (p)	Hapoel Tel Aviv
1981–82	19 May 1982	Hapoel Yehud (1)	1–0	Hapoel Tel Aviv
1982–83	1 June 1983	Hapoel Tel Aviv (8)	3–2	Maccabi Tel Aviv
1983–84	3 April 1984	Hapoel Lod (1)	0–0 (a.e.t.) 3–2 (p)	Hapoel Be'er Sheva
1984–85	4 June 1985	Beitar Jerusalem (3)	1–0	Maccabi Haifa
1985–86	27 May 1986	Beitar Jerusalem (4)	2–1	Shimshon Tel Aviv
1986–87	9 June 1987	Maccabi Tel Aviv (16)	3–3 (a.e.t.) 4–3 (p)	Maccabi Haifa
1987–88	7 June 1988	Maccabi Tel Aviv (17)	2–1	Hapoel Tel Aviv
1988–89	14 June 1989	Beitar Jerusalem (5)	3–3 (a.e.t.) 4–3 (p)	Maccabi Haifa
1989–90	4 June 1990	Hapoel Kfar Saba (3)	1–0 (a.e.t.)	Shimshon Tel Aviv
1990–91	4 June 1991	Maccabi Haifa (2)^{†}	3–1	Hapoel Petah Tikva
1991–92	9 June 1992	Hapoel Petah Tikva (2)	3–1 (a.e.t.)	Maccabi Tel Aviv
1992–93	18 May 1993	Maccabi Haifa (3)	1–0	Maccabi Tel Aviv
1993–94	7 June 1994	Maccabi Tel Aviv (18)	2–0	Hapoel Tel Aviv
1994–95	30 May 1995	Maccabi Haifa (4)	2–0	Hapoel Haifa
1995–96	28 May 1996	Maccabi Tel Aviv (19)^{†}	4–1	Hapoel Ironi Rishon LeZion
1996–97	26 May 1997	Hapoel Be'er Sheva (1)	1–0	Maccabi Tel Aviv
1997–98	12 May 1998	Maccabi Haifa (5)	2–0 (a.e.t.)	Hapoel Jerusalem
1998–99	19 May 1999	Hapoel Tel Aviv (9)	1–1 (a.e.t.) 3–1 (p)	Beitar Jerusalem
1999–2000	17 May 2000	Hapoel Tel Aviv (10)^{†}	2–2 (a.e.t.) 4–2 (p)	Beitar Jerusalem
2000–01	22 May 2001	Maccabi Tel Aviv (20)	3–0	Maccabi Petah Tikva
2001–02	21 May 2002	Maccabi Tel Aviv (21)	0–0 (a.e.t.) 5–4 (p)	Maccabi Haifa
2002–03	27 May 2003	Hapoel Ramat Gan (1)^{*}	1–1 (a.e.t.) 5–4 (p)	Hapoel Be'er Sheva
2003–04	18 May 2004	Bnei Sakhnin (1)	4–1	Hapoel Haifa^{*}
2004–05	18 May 2005	Maccabi Tel Aviv (22)	2–2 (a.e.t.) 5–3 (p)	Maccabi Herzliya^{*}
2005–06	9 May 2006	Hapoel Tel Aviv (11)	1–0	Bnei Yehuda Tel Aviv
2006–07	16 May 2007	Hapoel Tel Aviv (12)	1–1 (a.e.t.) 5–4 (p)	Hapoel Ashkelon^{*}
2007–08	13 May 2008	Beitar Jerusalem (6)	0–0 (a.e.t.) 5–4 (p)	Hapoel Tel Aviv
2008–09	26 May 2009	Beitar Jerusalem (7)	2–1	Maccabi Haifa^{†}
2009–10	11 May 2010	Hapoel Tel Aviv (13)^{†}	3–1	Bnei Yehuda
2010–11	25 May 2011	Hapoel Tel Aviv (14)	1–0	Maccabi Haifa^{†}
2011–12	15 May 2012	Hapoel Tel Aviv (15)	2–1	Maccabi Haifa
2012–13	8 May 2013	Hapoel Ramat Gan (2)	1–1 (a.e.t.) 4–2 (p)	Ironi Kiryat Shmona
2013–14	7 May 2014	Ironi Kiryat Shmona (1)	1–0 (a.e.t.)	Maccabi Netanya^{*}
2014–15	20 May 2015	Maccabi Tel Aviv (23)^{§ (Note: Winners also won the Israeli league championship and League Cup during the same season.)}	6–2	Hapoel Be'er Sheva
2015–16	24 May 2016	Maccabi Haifa (6)	1–0	Maccabi Tel Aviv
2016–17	25 May 2017	Bnei Yehuda (3)	0–0 (a.e.t.) 4–3 (p)	Maccabi Tel Aviv
2017–18	9 May 2018	Hapoel Haifa (4)	3–1 (a.e.t.)	Beitar Jerusalem
2018–19	15 May 2019	Bnei Yehuda (4)	1–1 (a.e.t.) 5–4 (p)	Maccabi Netanya
2019–20	13 July 2020	Hapoel Be'er Sheva (2)	2–0	Maccabi Petah Tikva
2020–21	2 June 2021	Maccabi Tel Aviv (24)^{‡}	2–1 (a.e.t.)	Hapoel Tel Aviv
2021–22	24 May 2022	Hapoel Be'er Sheva (3)	2–2 (a.e.t.) 3–1 (p)	Maccabi Haifa^{§}
2022–23	23 May 2023	Beitar Jerusalem (8)	3–0	Maccabi Netanya^{‡}
2023–24	30 May 2024	Maccabi Petah Tikva (3)	1–0	Hapoel Be'er Sheva
2024–25	29 May 2025	Hapoel Be'er Sheva (4)	2–0	Beitar Jerusalem
2025–26	26 May 2026	Maccabi Tel Aviv	2–1	Hapoel Be'er Sheva^{†}

== Performances ==
Cup titles won by club (%)
1. Maccabi Tel Aviv – 24 (27.0%)
2. Hapoel Tel Aviv – 16 (18.0%)
3. Beitar Jerusalem – 8 (9.00%)
4. Maccabi Haifa – 6 (6.70%)
5. Hapoel Haifa – 4 (4.50%)
6. Bnei Yehuda – 4 (4.50%)
7. Hapoel Be'er Sheva – 4 (4.50%)
8. Hapoel Kfar Saba – 3 (3.40%)
9. Maccabi Petah Tikva – 3 (3.40%)
10. Other clubs – 17 (19.1%)

Excluding unofficial competitions, 20 clubs have won the Israel State Cup. Twenty-five have been runners-up, and of these 11 are yet to win a cup final.

Six of the 20 cup-winning clubs have never lost the competition's deciding game, but only two of these have played in more than one final. Hapoel Kfar Saba have won all three finals in which they have appeared, while Hapoel Ramat Gan have appeared in two finals and won them both.

By contrast, Shimshon Tel Aviv have lost the cup final three times, every time they have played in it. Hapoel Petah Tikva have lost the cup final seven times (record).

Maccabi Tel Aviv has won the trophy 25 times, being the most successful club in the competition.

=== Performance by club ===
Total cup wins by club
Club	Winners	Runners-up	Winning years	Runners-up years
Maccabi Tel Aviv	25	13	1929, 1930, 1933, 1941, 1946, 1947, 1954, 1955, 1958, 1959, 1964, 1965, 1967, 1970, 1977, 1987, 1988, 1994, 1996, 2001, 2002, 2005, 2015, 2021, 2026	1934, 1938, 1940, 1952, 1962, 1976, 1979, 1983, 1992, 1993, 1997, 2016, 2017
Hapoel Tel Aviv	16	9	1928, 1934, 1937, 1938, 1939, 1944, 1961, 1972, 1983, 1999, 2000, 2006, 2007, 2010, 2011, 2012	1933, 1941, 1967, 1981, 1982, 1988, 1994, 2008, 2021
Beitar Jerusalem	8	5	1976, 1979, 1985, 1986, 1989, 2008, 2009, 2023	1975, 1999, 2000, 2018, 2025
Maccabi Haifa	6	11	1962, 1991, 1993, 1995, 1998, 2016	1942, 1963, 1971, 1985, 1987, 1989, 2002, 2009, 2011, 2012, 2022
Hapoel Haifa	4	5	1963, 1966, 1974, 2018	1932, 1958, 1964, 1995, 2004
Hapoel Be'er Sheva	4	5	1997, 2020, 2022, 2025	1984, 2003, 2015, 2024, 2026
Bnei Yehuda Tel Aviv	4	4	1968, 1981, 2017, 2019	1965, 1978, 2006, 2010
Maccabi Petah Tikva	3	3	1935, 1952, 2024	1939, 2001, 2020
Hapoel Kfar Saba	3	–	1975, 1980, 1990	–
Hapoel Petah Tikva	2	7	1957, 1992	1944, 1955, 1959, 1961, 1968, 1974, 1991
Beitar Tel Aviv	2	2	1940, 1942	1947, 1977
Hakoah Ramat Gan	2	1	1969, 1971	1973
Hapoel Ramat Gan	2	–	2003, 2013	–
Maccabi Netanya	1	5	1978	1954, 1970, 2014, 2019, 2023
Hapoel Jerusalem	1	3	1973	1943, 1972, 1998
Maccabi Hasmonean Jerusalem	1	1	1928	1929
Ironi Kiryat Shmona	1	1	2014	2013
British Police	1	–	1932	–
Gunners	1	–	1943	–
Hapoel Yehud	1	–	1982	–
Hapoel Lod	1	–	1984	–
Bnei Sakhnin	1	–	2004	–
Shimshon Tel Aviv	–	3	–	1966, 1986, 1990
Hapoel Ironi Rishon LeZion	–	2	–	1946, 1996
48th Battalion British Army	–	1	–	1930
Hakoah Tel Aviv	–	1	–	1935
Hapoel HaDarom Tel Aviv	–	1	–	1937
Maccabi Jaffa	–	1	–	1957
Maccabi Sha'arayim	–	1	–	1969
Maccabi Ramat Amidar	–	1	–	1980
Maccabi Herzliya	–	1	–	2005
Hapoel Ashkelon	–	1	–	2007

=== Total cup wins by city ===
The 20 Israel State Cup-winning sides have come from 12 cities. The most successful home city by some distance is Tel Aviv; clubs from this city have won four times as many cup titles as the next most successful in this regard, Jerusalem.

Total cup wins by city
City	Won	Clubs
Tel Aviv	44	Maccabi Tel Aviv (24), Hapoel Tel Aviv (16), Beitar Tel Aviv (2), Bnei Yehuda Tel Aviv (2)
Haifa	11	Maccabi Haifa (6), Hapoel Haifa (4), Gunners (1)
Jerusalem	11	Beitar Jerusalem (8), Hapoel Jerusalem (1), Maccabi Hasmonean Jerusalem (1), British Police (1)
Petah Tikva	5	Maccabi Petah Tikva (3), Hapoel Petah Tikva (2)
Ramat Gan	4	Hakoah Ramat Gan (2), Hapoel Ramat Gan (2)
Beersheba	4	Hapoel Be'er Sheva (4)
Kfar Saba	3	Hapoel Kfar Saba (3)
Sakhnin	1	Bnei Sakhnin (1)
Yehud	1	Hapoel Yehud (1)
Lod	1	Hapoel Lod (1)
Netanya	1	Maccabi Netanya (1)
Kiryat Shmona	1	Ironi Kiryat Shmona (1)

=== Total cup wins by district ===
There have been 20 winners of the Israel State Cup, from six districts. Tel Aviv District is the most successful, with over four times as many cup wins as the next most successful district, Jerusalem. Judea and Samaria Area, the Israeli district name for the Israeli-occupied West Bank excluding East Jerusalem, is the only district that has yet to produce a cup-winning side.

Total cup wins by district
District	Won	Clubs
Tel Aviv	47	Maccabi Tel Aviv (24), Hapoel Tel Aviv (15), Beitar Tel Aviv (2), Bnei Yehuda Tel Aviv (2), Hakoah Ramat Gan (2), Hapoel Ramat Gan (2)
Haifa	11	Maccabi Haifa (6), Hapoel Haifa (4), Gunners (1)
Jerusalem	11	Beitar Jerusalem (8), Hapoel Jerusalem (1), Maccabi Hasmonean Jerusalem (1), British Police (1)
Center	11	Hapoel Kfar Saba (3), Maccabi Petah Tikva (3), Hapoel Petah Tikva (2), Hapoel Lod (1), Hapoel Yehud (1), Maccabi Netanya (1)
South	4	Hapoel Be'er Sheva (4)
North	2	Bnei Sakhnin (1), Ironi Kiryat Shmona (1)
