= List of Hapoel Herzliya F.C. seasons =

This is a list of seasons played by Hapoel Herzliya Football Club in Israeli and European football, from 1934–35 (when the club first competed in the Cup) to the most recent completed season. It details the club's achievements in major competitions, and the top scorers for each season. Top scorers in bold were also the top scorers in the Israeli league that season. Records of minor competitions such as the Lilian Cup are not included due to them being considered of less importance than the State Cup and the Toto Cup.

The club had played in the Palestine League from 1938 to 1947. After the establishment of Israel, the club mostly played in lower divisions.

== History ==
Hapoel Herzliya Sports Club was established in 1928, playing its first recorded football matches in November 1931. The club won the second division in 1937 and was promoted to the top division, where the club played until relegating at the end of the 1946–47 season, after which the club slipped down the divisions, reaching bottom division Liga Gimel in 1956. The club played in second division Liga Alef between 1963 and 1976, but once again relegated, reaching its lowest ever placing, playing in fifth division Liga Bet in 1999–2000. The club managed to return to the second division in 2010.

== Seasons ==
Season	League									State Cup	League Cup	International (Asia/Europe)	Top goalscorer (Note: Goals in all competitions (Liga Leumit or Liga Al, State Cup, Toto Cup and European) are counted.)	
Season	Division	P	W	D	L	F	A	Pts	Pos	State Cup	League Cup	International (Asia/Europe)	Name	Goals
1934–35	–	–	–	–	–	–	–	–	–	R1	–	–		
1935–36	–	–	–	–	–	–	–	–	–	– (Note: After three matches played in the first round the competition was abandoned due to the Arab Revolt.)	–	–		
1936–37	–	–	–	–	–	–	–	–	–	R1	–	–		
1937–38	Bet	8	6	1	1	24	1	13	1st	R1	–	–		
1938–39	Pal. League (Note: The 1938–39 league season was abandoned after playing one round of matches due to the Arab Revolt.)	8	3	0	5	11	20	6	6th	QF	–	–		
1939–40	Pal. League	14	0	2	12	6	53	2	8th	R2	–	–		
1940–41	–	–	–	–	–	–	–	–	–	–	–	–		
1941–42	Pal. League; Southern (Note: The 1941–42 league season was held in three regional divisions followed by a play-off. The league was completed during the 1942–43 season.)	26	4	3	19	27	66	11	11th	–	–	–		
1942–43	–	–	–	–	–	–	–	–	–	QF	–	–		
1943–44	Pal. League	22	1	1	20	16	100	3	14th	– (Note: The 1944 cup competitions began on 5 February 1944 and was completed during the following season, on 13 January 1945.)	–	–		
1944–45	Pal. League; Northern	1	0	0	1	0	3	–	8th (Note: Hapoel Herzliya withdrew from the league after playing one match.)	–	–	–		
1945–46	–	–	–	–	–	–	–	–	–	R1	–	–		
1946–47	Pal. League	26	0	1	25	12	100	1	14th	–	–	–		
1947–48	Bet South (Note: The 1947–48 league was abandoned due to the 1948 Arab–Israeli War.)	4	1	0	3	2	14	2	11th	–	–	–		
1948–49	–	–	–	–	–	–	–	–	–	– (Note: The 1949 cup competition was delayed by appeals after the completion of the quarter-finals. After settling the appeals three further matches were played in February 1951, and the competition was abandoned.)	–	–		
1949–50	Meuhedet Sharon	16	12	3	1	50	12	27	2nd	–	–	–		
1950–51	–	–	–	–	–	–	–	–	–	–	–	–		
1951–52	Bet South	26	5	4	17	24	71	14	12th	R2	–	–		
1952–53	–	–	–	–	–	–	–	–	–	R2	–	–		
1953–54	Bet South	26	4	6	16	30	89	14	13th	R2	–	–		
1954–55	Gimel Sharon	26	19	2	5	81	32	40	3rd	R3	–	–		
1955–56	Gimel Sharon								2nd	–	–	–		
1956–57	Gimel Sharon									Int. Round	–	–		
1957–58	Gimel Dan									R6	–	–		
1958–59	Gimel Dan									R2	–	–		
1959–60	Bet North B	30				103	22	52	1st	SF	–	–		
1960–61	Alef	26	7	5	14	33	54	19	14th	SF	–	–		
1961–62	Bet North B	30				45	44	29	8th	R3	–	–		
1962–63	Bet North B	30				65	33	39	5th	R5	–	–		
1963–64	Alef North	26	7	7	12	32	43	21	9th	Round of 16	–	–		
1964–65	Alef North	30	9	9	12	45	40	27	9th	R4	–	–		
1965–66	Alef North	30	7	9	14	36	51	23	13th	R4	–	–		
1966–67	Alef North	60	23	14	23	87	77	60	6th	R6	–	–		
1967–68	Alef North	60	23	14	23	87	77	60	6th	R4	–	–		
1968–69	Alef North	30	14	11	5	46	23	39	3rd	R6	–	–		
1969–70	Alef North	30	11	13	6	31	29	35	2nd	R5	–	–		
1970–71	Alef North	30	9	10	11	38	51	28	8th	R6	–	–		
1971–72	Alef North	30	7	12	11	27	35	26	14th	R4	–	–		
1972–73	Alef North	30	8	12	10	34	35	28	7th	R6	Group	–		
1973–74	Alef North	30	9	6	15	24	35	24	13th	R4	–	–		
1974–75	Alef North	30	4	19	7	27	29	27	13th	R3	–	–		
1975–76	Alef North	34	7	10	15	26	39	24	15th	R2	–	–		
1976–77	Alef South	26	11	6	9	41	32	28	3rd	R3	–	–		
1977–78	Alef North	26	7	9	10	30	32	22 (Note: Hapoel Herzliya had one point deducted)	11th	R4	–	–		
1978–79	Alef North	26	11	10	5	32	21	32	2nd	R6	–	–		
1979–80	Artzit	30	5	9	16	20	43	19	16th	R7	–	–		
1980–81	Alef South	26				29	30	22	9th	R5	–	–		
1981–82	Alef South	24				21	48	14	13th	R6	–	–		
1982–83	Bet South A	26				27	30	22	9th	R4	–	–		
1983–84	Bet South A	26				49	26	31	5th	R3	–	–		
1984–85	Bet South A	26				29	42	20	12th	R4	–	–		
1985–86	Bet South A	26				24	30	21	12th	R4	–	–		
1986–87	Bet South A	26				32	27	31	3rd	R5	–	–		
1987–88	Bet South A	26				28	31	24	9th	R4	–	–		
1988–89	Bet South A									R4	–	–		
1989–90	Bet North B	26				23	20	25	5th	R3	–	–		
1990–91	Bet North B	26				45	23	28	5th	R3	–	–		
1991–92	Bet North B	26				42	32	28	3rd	R4	–	–		
1992–93	Bet North B	30				41	28	36	3rd	R2	–	–		
1993–94	Bet South A	30				41	47	26	10th	R3	–	–		
1994–95	Bet South A	30				43	29	36	3rd	R3	–	–		
1995–96	Bet South A	30	12	13	5	53	21	49	5th	R3	–	–		
1996–97	Bet South A	30	12	6	12	39	30	42	8th	R2	–	–		
1997–98	Bet South A	30	11	9	10	36	33	42	7th	R2	–	–		
1998–99	Bet South A	30	17	10	3	52	18	61	2nd	R4	–	–		
1999–2000	Bet	26	12	9	5	33	22	45	1st	R2	–	–		
2000–01	Alef South	28	14	7	7	48	20	49	4th	R6	–	–		
2001–02	Alef South	26	12	10	4	53	20	46	3rd	R8	–	–		
2002–03	Alef	26	21	4	1	74	10	67	1st	R8	–	–		
2003–04	Artzit	33	12	6	15	45	47	42	6th	R8	SF	–		
2004–05	Artzit	33	9	11	13	33	45	38	7th	R7	SF	–		
2005–06	Artzit	33	10	11	12	34	39	41	8th	R8	Group	–		
2006–07	Artzit	33	10	7	16	35	41	37	11th	Round of 16	Group	–	David Bachar	12
2007–08	Alef North	26	12	6	8	48	25	42	4th	R5	–	–	Offer Sa'ar	11
2008–09	Alef North	26	11	6	9	35	25	39	3rd	R8	–	–	Eran Fuss; Tal Bublil	6
2009–10	Alef South	30	20	7	3	63	20	67	1st	R5	–	–	Offer Sa'ar	13
2010–11	Leumit	33	15	8	10	46	37	30 (Note: Hapoel Herzliya scored 46 points in the regular season, which were halved at the beginning of the play-offs. The club scored 7 more points during the play-offs for a total of 53 points.)	7th	R7	Group	–	Reef Mesika	12
2011–12	Leumit	35	6	8	21	25	51	16 (Note: Hapoel Herzliya scored 21 points in the regular season, which were halved at the beginning of the play-offs. The club scored 5 more points during the play-offs for a total of 24 points.)	16th	R7	SF	–	Yaniv David	6
2012–13	Alef North	30	12	10	8	40	32	46	5th	R8	–	–	Omer Buaron	12
2013–14	Alef North	30	13	6	11	43	34	45	6th	R5	–	–	Omer Buaron; Guy Cohen	8
2014–15	Alef	30	19	5	6	67	28	62	3rd	R5	–	–	Fadi Ziadeh	19
2015–16	Alef	30	14	7	9	44	29	49	4th	R7	–	–	Kobi Hassan	10

== Key ==
- P = Played
- W = Games won
- D = Games drawn
- L = Games lost
- F = Goals for
- A = Goals against
- Pts = Points
- Pos = Final position
- Leumit = Liga Leumit (National League)
- Artzit = Liga Artzit (Nationwide League)
- Premier = Liga Al (Premier League)
- Pal. League = Palestine League
- F = Final
- Group = Group stage
- QF = Quarter-finals
- QR1 = First Qualifying Round
- QR2 = Second Qualifying Round
- QR3 = Third Qualifying Round
- QR4 = Fourth Qualifying Round
- RInt = Intermediate Round
- R1 = Round 1
- R2 = Round 2
- R3 = Round 3
- R4 = Round 4
- R5 = Round 5
- R6 = Round 6
- SF = Semi-finals

Champions	Runners-up	Promoted	Relegated
