= 1931–32 in Mandatory Palestine football =

Football in Mandatory Palestine
- Season: 1931–32

The 1931–32 season was the fifth season of competitive football in the British Mandate of Palestine under the Eretz Israel Football Association.

== IFA Competitions ==
=== 1931–32 Palestine League ===
The first Palestine League season was opened in November 1931 and ended on 27 May 1932. Winners were British Police. During the season the first (and second) league derbies of Tel Aviv and Haifa were played. In Tel Aviv the first match has ended with a 1–1 draw, while Hapoel won the second match 5–1. In Haifa, Hapoel won both matches, 5–0 and 7–2.

Pos	Team	Pld	W	D	L	GF	GA	GR	Pts
1	British Police (C)	15	12	3	0	62	18	3.444	27
2	Hapoel Tel Aviv	15	11	2	2	52	13	4.000	24
3	Hapoel Haifa	12	8	2	2	33	15	2.200	18
4	Maccabi Hashmonai	15	8	2	5	35	32	1.094	18
5	Maccabi Tel Aviv	15	7	2	6	37	38	0.974	16
6	Maccabi Petah Tikva	16	4	1	11	30	45	0.667	9
7	Maccabi Haifa	14	3	2	9	22	42	0.524	8
8	Maccabi Nes Tziona	15	2	3	10	16	35	0.457	7
9	Hapoel Jerusalem	13	1	1	11	11	60	0.183	3

Updated to match(es) played on 27 May 1932. Source: IFA, Do'ar HaYom
(C) Champions

=== 1932 Palestine Cup ===
The 1932 Palestine Cup was won by British Police, who were awarded the final match, after it was abandoned on the 37th minute due to protest of Hapoel Haifa after the referee awarded the Police a penalty kick.

=== Final ===
7 May 1932

Hapoel Haifa	w/o (1–0) (abandoned '37)	British Police
Gaist 22'

Maccabi Avshalem Petah Tikva field
Attendance: 7,000
Referee: MacKenzie

== Notable events ==
- In the 1932 Maccabiah Games, two football matches were played between Maccabi teams from Eretz Israel (composed of Maccabi players only) and Poland. The first match between the teams ended in a 2–2 draw, while Poland won the second match 3–2. A further friendly match between the sides ended with a 4–2 victory to Eretz Israel.
