= 1922–23 Maccabi Tel Aviv F.C. season =

Maccabi Tel Aviv
1922–23 season

The 1922–23 season was Maccabi Tel Aviv's 17th season since its establishment in 1906. As the local football association wasn't founded until July 1928, there were no officially organized competitions during the season, and the club played only friendly matches.

== Overview ==
During the season, the club took part in the main cup competition, the Palestine Cup, which was organized by the British-run Jerusalem Sports Club, losing 1–7 in the first round to No. 14 Squadron RAF, who went on to win the cup. The management of the club created a separate cup competition which was called "The Hebrew Cup", and entered its B team, which were beaten in the quarter finals by Ayala Tel Aviv. After the successful completion of the cup, the club management organized a league competition with 7 clubs joining Maccabi Tel Aviv which was called Mis'chaki HaBechora (Hebrew: משחקי הבכורה, lit. The Premier Games), The league was completed during the following season.

== Known Matches ==
=== Palestine Cup ===
Date	Opponent	Venue	Result	Scorers
24 February 1923	Palestine General Hospital	Ramleh	1–7	

=== The Hebrew Cup ===
Maccabi Tel Aviv entered it B team to the competition.

Date	Opponent	Venue	Result	Scorers
	Beranovich Tel Aviv		5–0	
1 April 1923	Ayala Tel Aviv		1–2	

=== Mis'chakei HaBechora ===
==== Table (as of 21 July 1923) ====
Pos	Team	Pld	W	D	L	GF	GA	GR	Pts
1	Maccabi Tel Aviv	3	3	0	0	7	1	7.000	6
2	Maccabi Nes Tziona	4	3	0	1	11	8	1.375	6
3	Maccabi Petah Tikva	4	2	1	1	12	3	4.000	5
4	Nordia Rishon LeZion	5	1	3	1	7	5	1.400	5
5	Hakoah Tel Aviv	3	1	1	1	5	3	1.667	3
6	Ayala	2	1	0	1	5	5	1.000	2
7	Ofer	4	0	1	3	1	14	0.071	1
8	Rehovot	3	0	0	3	1	10	0.100	0

Updated to match(es) played on 21 July 1923. Source: Do'ar HaYom

==== Matches ====
Date	Opponent	Venue	Result	Scorers
9 June 1923	Ofer Tel Aviv	Palms Stadium	2–0	
14 July 1923	Maccabi Nes Tziona	Palms Stadium	4–1	Wilson (2), Grazovski (2)
21 July 1923	Maccabi Petah Tikva	Maccabi Petah Tikva ground	1–0	Grazovski

=== Known friendly matches ===
Date	Opponent	Venue	Result	Scorers
4 November 1922	RAF Ramleh	Palms Stadium	3–3	Lumek, Kushnir (2)
11 November 1922	British Police, 6th Company (Sarafand)	Palms Stadium	0–0	
18 November 1922	British Police, Mounted Company (Lydda)	Palms Stadium	1–3	Weissbord
2 December 1922	British Police, 5th Company (Sarafand)	Palms Stadium	7–1	Steinbuch, Rubinstein, Grazovski, Lumek (2), Kushnir (2)
23 December 1922	British Police (Sarafand)	Palms Stadium	1–4	Wilson
30 December 1922	Transport	Palms Stadium	1–0	Kumrov
6 January 1923	Jerusalem Sports Club	Palms Stadium	7–3	Wilson (4), Kumrov (2), Grazovski
3 February 1923	Transport	Sarafand	0–0	
