= 1996–97 Israel State Cup =

Tournament details
- Country: Israel

Final positions
- Champions: Hapoel Be'er Sheva
- Runners-up: Maccabi Tel Aviv

The 1996–97 Israel State Cup (Hebrew: גביע המדינה, Gvia HaMedina) was the 58th season of Israel's nationwide football cup competition, and the 43rd since the Israeli Declaration of Independence.

The competition was won by Hapoel Be'er Sheva, who defeated Maccabi Tel Aviv 1–0 in the final.

By winning, Hapoel Be'er Sheva qualified to the 1997–98 UEFA Cup Winners' Cup, entering the qualifying round.

== Results ==
=== Eighth Round ===
Home team	Score	Away team
Maccabi Tel Aviv	4–2	Hapoel Bat Yam
Hapoel Ramat HaSharon	0–3	Hapoel Be'er Sheva
Maccabi Acre	1–3 (a.e.t.)	Hapoel Tzafririm Holon
Hapoel Beit She'an	5–0	Sektzia Nes Tziona
Maccabi Haifa	5–1	Hapoel Kiryat Shmona
Maccabi Ironi Ashdod	0–1	Hapoel Tel Aviv
Maccabi Petah Tikva	1–0	Maccabi Netanya
Hapoel Ashkelon	3–1	Ironi Rishon LeZion
Maccabi Jerusalem/Ma'ale Adumim	0–3	Hapoel Tayibe
Hapoel Yehud	0–2	Beitar Jerusalem
Beitar Tel Aviv	1–2	Hapoel Kfar Saba
Hapoel Petah Tikva	2–1	Hapoel Nazareth Illit
Maccabi Herzliya	2–0	Bnei Sakhnin
Bnei Yehuda	3–2	Maccabi Kiryat Gat
Hapoel Jerusalem	3–0	Hapoel Hod HaSharon
Maccabi Jaffa	0–1	Hapoel Haifa

=== Round of 16 ===
Home team	Score	Away team
Hapoel Haifa	0–2 (a.e.t.)	Bnei Yehuda
Beitar Jerusalem	5–2	Maccabi Herzliya
Hapoel Beit She'an	3–1	Hapoel Jerusalem
Maccabi Petah Tikva	0–0 (a.e.t.) 2–4 p.	Hapoel Be'er Sheva
Hapoel Tel Aviv	0–0 (a.e.t.) 6–5 p.	Hapoel Petah Tikva
Maccabi Haifa	2–0 (a.e.t.)	Hapoel Ashkelon
Hapoel Tayibe	0–2	Hapoel Kfar Saba
Hapoel Tzafririm Holon	2–3	Maccabi Tel Aviv

=== Quarter-finals ===
Home team	Score	Away team
Beitar Jerusalem	4–0	Hapoel Beit She'an
Bnei Yehuda	1–0	Maccabi Haifa
Maccabi Tel Aviv	3–0	Hapoel Tel Aviv
Hapoel Be'er Sheva	0–0 (a.e.t.) 5–3 p.	Hapoel Kfar Saba

=== Semi-finals ===
Home team	Score	Away team
Hapoel Be'er Sheva	5–2	Bnei Yehuda
Maccabi Tel Aviv	2–0	Beitar Jerusalem

=== Final ===
26 May 1997

Maccabi Tel Aviv	0–1	Hapoel Be'er Sheva
		Roso 40'

Ramat Gan Stadium
Attendance: 25000
Referee: Klein
