= 1933 Palestine Cup =

Tournament details
- Country: Mandatory Palestine
- Teams: 11

Final positions
- Champions: Maccabi Tel Aviv (3rd title)
- Runners-up: Hapoel Tel Aviv

Tournament statistics
- Matches played: 9
- Goals scored: 42 (4.67 per match)

The 1933 Palestine Cup (Hebrew: הגביע הארץ-ישראלי, HaGavia HaEretz-Israeli) was the fifth season of Israeli Football Association's nationwide football cup competition. The defending holders, British Police, didn't take part in the competition.

For the first time, all team participating were Jewish clubs, as British and Arab teams declined to enter. Maccabi Tel Aviv and Hapoel Tel Aviv met in the final, the former winning the cup by a single goal.

== Results ==
=== First round ===
Home team	Score	Away team
Hapoel Jerusalem	w/o	Maccabi Haifa
Maccabi Hadera	0–1	Maccabi Nes Tziona
Maccabi Rehovot	2–1	Hapoel Hadera

=== Quarter-finals ===
Home team	Score	Away team
Hapoel Haifa	5–3	Hapoel Jerusalem
Maccabi Avshalom Petah Tikva	4–0	Maccabi Nes Tziona
Hapoel Tel Aviv	9–0	Maccabi Rehovot
Maccabi Hasmonean Jerusalem	abandoned (Note: The first match was abandoned during extra time, with Maccabi Hasmonean Jerusalem leading 3–2, due to the late hour and darkness. A replay was ordered.)	Maccabi Tel Aviv

==== Replay ====
Home team	Score	Away team
Maccabi Hasmonean Jerusalem	0–3 (Note: The match was abandoned at the 80th minute after the crowd stormed the pitch, with Maccabi Tel Aviv leading 3–0. The result was confirmed by the EIFA.)	Maccabi Tel Aviv

=== Semi-finals ===
Home team	Score	Away team
Hapoel Tel Aviv	5–0	Hapoel Haifa
Maccabi Tel Aviv	6–2	Maccabi Avshalom Petah Tikva

=== Final ===
10 June 1933

Hapoel Tel Aviv	0–1	Maccabi Tel Aviv
		89' Ya'akobi

Maccabi Petah Tikva ground
Attendance: 5000
Referee: Adler
