= 1943 Palestine Cup =

1943 Palestine Wartime Cup
Tournament details
- Country: Mandatory Palestine

Final positions
- Champions: Gunners
- Runners-up: Hapoel Jerusalem

The 1943 Palestine Wartime Cup (Hebrew: הגביע המלחמתי, HaGavia HaMilhamti) was a special edition of the Palestine Cup, declared to be separate from the main Palestine Cup competition with its own trophy However, the IFA recognize the title as part of the main competition.

The competition was split into four regional competitions, with the four regional winners competing in the final phase. The Royal Artillery XI from Haifa, nicknamed The Gunners won the competition, defeating Hapoel Jerusalem 7–1 in the final.

== First Phase ==
=== Haifa region ===
Home team	Score	Away team
First Round
Shabab el-Arab	4–0	Tarsana
Semi-finals
Hapoel Haifa	1–1 (Note: Shabab's crowd invaded the pitch after during the break between regular time and extra time and assaulted the referee. A replay was set to be played in Tel Aviv.)	Shabab el-Arab
Gunners	4–3	Workshop
Semi-final replay
Hapoel Haifa	2–0	Shabab el-Arab
Final
Gunners	5–1	Hapoel Haifa

=== Samaria region ===
Home team	Score	Away team
Semi-finals
Con-Depot	5–2	Maccabi Netanya
Beitar Netanya	1–3	Hapoel Herzliya
Final
Con-Depot	5–0	Hapoel Herzliya

=== Jerusalem region ===
Home team	Score	Away team
First Round
Maccabi Jerusalem	3–1	Splints
Semi-finals
Hapoel Jerusalem	5–0 (Note: The match was abandoned as a Homenetmen player was sent-off and refused to leave the pitch.)	Homenetmen Jerusalem
Maccabi Jerusalem	5–1	Degel Zion
Final
Hapoel Jerusalem	2–2 (Note: The match was abandoned as players from both clubs began fighting. A replay was ordered, to be played in Rishon LeZion.)	Maccabi Jerusalem
Final replay
Hapoel Jerusalem	3–1 (Note: The match was abandoned at the 88th minute as Maccabi player attacked the referee after a penalty was awarded to Hapoel.)	Maccabi Jerusalem

=== South region ===
Home team	Score	Away team
First round
Beitar Tel Aviv	3–1	1st Jewish Battalion
Hapoel Rehovot	1–5	Hapoel Tel Aviv
Hapoel Ramat Gan	3–0	Maccabi Nes Tziona
Maccabi Rehovot	3–0	Maccabi Company
Second round
Hapoel Tel Aviv	1–0	Maccabi Rehovot
Beitar Tel Aviv	3–1 (Note: The match was abandoned at the 80th minute as a Rishon LeZion player attacked the referee. A replay was ordered, to be played in Rishon LeZion.)	Maccabi Rishon LeZion
Hapoel Ramat Gan	4–3	Hapoel Petah Tikva
Maccabi Tel Aviv	4–2	RAF XI
Semi-finals
Hapoel Ramat Gan	4–3	Maccabi Tel Aviv
Hapoel Tel Aviv	0–0 (a.e.t.) (Note: The match was abandoned towards the end of extra time as players from both clubs began fighting between themselves and members of the crowd.)	Beitar Tel Aviv
Semi-final replay
Beitar Tel Aviv	2–0	Hapoel Tel Aviv
Final
Beitar Tel Aviv	3–0	Hapoel Ramat Gan

=== Semi-finals ===
Home team	Score	Away team
Gunners	7–0	Con-Depot
Beitar Tel Aviv	w/o (Note: Beitar Tel Aviv was suspended from all IFA activity after hosting NSC Cairo on 28 August 1943 against Egyptian Football Association and Eretz Israel Football Association orders to both clubs.)	Hapoel Jerusalem

=== Final ===
16 October 1943

Gunners	7–1	Hapoel Jerusalem
	Summary

Hapoel Petah Tikva ground
