= Romek Fein =

Romek Fein (March 1921 – 5 July 2026) was a Jewish Israeli soldier and commander during the 1948 war, later to become a chemist and pioneer of Israel's military rocket industry.

== Biography ==
Fein was born in Łódź, Poland, the middle child between two sisters. His father owned a chemical factory for the textile industry. Fein attended the local Hebrew school and was active in the Zionist youth movement. His family survived the Holocaust, as they moved from Łódź to Bucharest. When he was 12 years old, Fein was sent to study in Palestine at the Hebrew Reali School, where he was given his Hebrew name, Yerahmiel.

As a teenager, Romek joined the Haganah, under the command of Ephraim Katzir. In 1939, together with his schoolmate Yehoshafat Harkabi, Fein moved to the newly founded kibbutz Hanita. Later he moved to Jerusalem and began studying chemistry and mathematics at the Hebrew University of Jerusalem. During World War II, Romek volunteered for the British Army, initially serving in the Palestine Regiment and guarding POWs. He then served in a mapping unit, responsible for creating maps for British forces. He was stationed in Lebanon and Egypt during the war and served in the British Army for five years.

During the 1948 war, Fein served as a non commissioned officer in the Etzioni Brigade and fought in the battles for Jerusalem and Gush Etzion. As one of the longest living veterans of the 1948 war, Fein was active in the commemoration of the Etzioni Brigade and the Moriah Battalion.

After the war, Fein completed his undergraduate studies in chemistry and began a studying for a PhD in Paris. At the request of the Israeli government, Fein halted his studies to attend professional training in explosives. He returned to Israel three years later to join Israel Military Industries and was one of the founders of the Givon rocket plant in Ramla. He completed his PhD in chemistry at the Hebrew University, under the supervision of Hans Feilchenfeld, on the topic of catalytic oxidation of hydrobromic acid in the gas phase. Later he joined the Israeli Ministry of Economy and was a member of the Israel Atomic Energy Commission.

=== Family ===
Fein's first wife was Ruth Kahneman (sister of Daniel Kahneman). Their son Ilan became a pilot in the Israeli Air Force and died in a training accident in 1975. Fein's second wife, Mira Rosenblatt, founded an organization for special needs education. They had two sons.

Romek died at the age of 105 in Tel Aviv.
