= 1928 Palestine Cup =

Tournament details
- Country: Mandatory Palestine
- Teams: 12

Final positions
- Champions: Hapoel Allenby Tel Aviv; Maccabi Hasmonean Jerusalem (Title shared)

Tournament statistics
- Matches played: 12
- Goals scored: 37 (3.08 per match)

The 1928 People's Cup (Hebrew: גביע העם, Gvia HaAm) known originally as the Palestine Cup was the first season of Israeli Football Association's nationwide football cup competition. Matches began on 7 April 1928 and the final was played on 26 May 1928.

Hapoel Allenby Tel Aviv won the cup, beating Maccabi Hasmonean Jerusalem 2–0 in the final. However, the Jerusalem club appealed to the F.A., claiming that a Hapoel player, Moshe Meir was not registered. The appeal was accepted and the teams were ordered to share the cup.

== Background ==
Starting in 1922, unofficial cup competitions were held in Mandatory Palestine on an annual, national basis under the sponsorship of Britain's military garrison there, at start involving British teams only, but in subsequent years, Arab and Jewish teams as well. As these cups pre-date the existence of a national football association, they are not considered official by the Israel Football Association. During this time there was also a national cup organised by the Maccabi organisation, the Magen Shimshon, but this only included Maccabi clubs.

== Results ==
=== First round ===
The matches were played on 7 April 1928 and 14 April 1928.

Home team	Score	Away team
Hapoel Haifa	3–1	Sporting Club El-Carmel Haifa
Maccabi Tel Aviv	5–0	Maccabi Avshalem Petah Tikva
Maccabi Hasmonean Jerusalem	2–0	RAF Amman
British Police Mount Scopus	4–0	Hapoel Jerusalem

=== Quarter-finals ===
The matches were played on 21 April 1928 and 28 April 1928. The Replay between Hapoel Haifa and British Police was played on 5 May 1928.

Home team	Score	Away team
British Police Mount Scopus	0–0	Hapoel Haifa
P.G.H. Sarafand	3–3	Hapoel Allenby Tel Aviv
Maccabi Hasmonean Jerusalem	3–2	Maccabi Tel Aviv
Gaza Bedouins	w/o	Palestine Police Force

==== Replays ====
Home team	Score	Away team
Hapoel Haifa	2–1	British Police Mount Scopus
Hapoel Allenby Tel Aviv	3–1	P.G.H. Sarafand

=== Semi-finals ===
4 May 1928

Hapoel Allenby Tel Aviv	1–0	Gaza Bedouins
Meir (pen.)	Do'ar HaYom; Davar

Maccabi Sports Ground, Jerusalem

19 May 1928

Maccabi Hasmonean Jerusalem	1–0	Hapoel Haifa
Zwebner 50'	Do'ar HaYom [http://jpress.org.il/Default/Scripting/ArticleWin.asp?From=Archive&Source=Page&Skin=TAUHe&BaseHref=DAV/1928/05/24&PageLabelPrint=&EntityId=Ar00303&ViewMode=HTML Davar

Maccabi Ground, Tel Aviv

=== Final ===
26 May 1928

Maccabi Hasmonean Jerusalem	0–2	Hapoel Allenby Tel Aviv
	Palestine Bulletin; Davar	66' M. Poliakov; 81' Nudelman

Maccabi Ground, Tel Aviv
Attendance: 6000
Referee: Adams

== See also ==
- 1927–28 in Mandatory Palestine football
