= 1994–95 Israel State Cup =

Tournament details
- Country: Israel

Final positions
- Champions: Maccabi Haifa (4th title)
- Runners-up: Hapoel Haifa

The 1994–95 Israel State Cup (Hebrew: גביע המדינה, Gvia HaMedina) was the 56th season of Israel's nationwide football cup competition and the 41st after the Israeli Declaration of Independence.

The competition was won by Maccabi Haifa who had beaten Hapoel Haifa 2–0 in the final.

By winning, Maccabi Haifa qualified to the 1995–96 UEFA Cup Winners' Cup, entering in the qualifying round.

== Results ==
=== Seventh Round ===
Home team	Score	Away team
Maccabi Jaffa	1–1 (a.e.t.) 3–5 p.	Maccabi Shikun HaMizrah
Hapoel Yeruham	4–2	Hapoel Kiryat Shmona
Hapoel Marmorek	1–1 (a.e.t.) 4–3 p.	Hapoel Tayibe
Maccabi Acre	2–2 (a.e.t.) 4–3 p.	Hapoel Jerusalem
Maccabi Ramat Amidar	0–1 (a.e.t.)	Hapoel Bat Yam
Hapoel Kiryat Ono	4–1	Hapoel Bir al-Maksur
Hapoel Karmiel	2–1 (a.e.t.)	Maccabi Umm al-Fahm
Hapoel Azor	1–2	Maccabi Ahi Nazareth
Maccabi Shefa-'Amr	1–2	Hakoah Maccabi Ramat Gan
Sektzia Nes Tziona	1–2 (a.e.t.)	Hapoel Kfar Saba
Hapoel Lod	3–1	Hapoel Ashkelon
Maccabi Yavne	0–2	Shimshon Tel Aviv
Hapoel Hadera	0–1	Hapoel Ramat Gan
Hapoel Kafr Kanna	2–0	A.S. Ramat Eliyahu
Hapoel Kfar Shalem	0–2 (a.e.t.)	Hapoel Ashdod
Maccabi Afula	0–1	Maccabi Kiryat Gat

=== Eighth Round ===
Home team	Score	Away team
Hapoel Yeruham	0–3	Maccabi Tel Aviv
Beitar Tel Aviv	0–1 (a.e.t.)	Hapoel Kfar Saba
Hapoel Tzafririm Holon	1–2	Hapoel Ramat Gan
Ironi Rishon Lezion	7–2	Hapoel Ashdod
Hapoel Petah Tikva	2–1	Hapoel Lod
Maccabi Ahi Nazareth	1–4	Hapoel Beit She'an
Hapoel Haifa	2–1	Hakoah Maccabi Ramat Gan
Maccabi Shikun HaMizrah	1–2	Maccabi Herzliya
Shimshon Tel Aviv	0–6	Bnei Yehuda
Maccabi Acre	0–3	Hapoel Be'er Sheva
Hapoel Tel Aviv	3–0	Maccabi Kiryat Gat
Hapoel Karmiel	1–3	Maccabi Haifa
Hapoel Kiryat Ono	1–4	Maccabi Ironi Ashdod
Beitar Jerusalem	3–1	Hapoel Bat Yam
Maccabi Petah Tikva	3–2	Hapoel Kafr Kanna
Hapoel Marmorek	0–4	Maccabi Netanya

=== Round of 16 ===
Home team	Score	Away team
Bnei Yehuda	2–1	Ironi Rishon Lezion
Maccabi Petah Tikva	0–1	Beitar Jerusalem
Maccabi Ironi Ashdod	4–2	Hapoel Beit She'an
Hapoel Be'er Sheva	1–2	Hapoel Kfar Saba
Maccabi Netanya	2–1	Maccabi Herzliya
Hapoel Petah Tikva	3–0	Hapoel Tel Aviv
Maccabi Tel Aviv	1–2	Maccabi Haifa
Hapoel Haifa	3–0 (a.e.t.)	Hapoel Ramat Gan

=== Quarter-finals ===
Home team	Score	Away team
Maccabi Haifa	3–2	Hapoel Kfar Saba
Hapoel Haifa	2–1	Bnei Yehuda
Beitar Jerusalem	3–1	Maccabi Ironi Ashdod
Hapoel Petah Tikva	0–2	Maccabi Netanya

=== Semi-finals ===
Home team	Score	Away team
Maccabi Haifa	2–0	Beitar Jerusalem
Hapoel Haifa	3–2	Maccabi Netanya

=== Final ===
30 May 1995

Maccabi Haifa	2–0	Hapoel Haifa
Shitrit 9'; Glam 60'

Ramat Gan Stadium
Attendance: 23000
Referee: Daud
