= 1998–99 Israel State Cup =

Tournament details
- Country: Israel

Final positions
- Champions: Hapoel Tel Aviv (9th Title)
- Runners-up: Beitar Jerusalem

The 1998–99 Israel State Cup (Hebrew: גביע המדינה, Gvia HaMedina) was the 60th season of Israel's nationwide football cup competition and the 45th after the Israeli Declaration of Independence.

The competition was won by Hapoel Tel Aviv who had beaten Beitar Jerusalem 3–1 on penalties after 1–1 in the final.

By winning, Hapoel Tel Aviv qualified to the 1999–2000 UEFA Cup, entering in the qualifying round.

== Results ==
=== Sixth Round ===
| Home team | Score | Away team |
|---|---|---|
| Hapoel Kafr Sumei | 2–1 (a.e.t.) | Maccabi Afula |
| Hapoel Majd al-Krum | 1–0 | Hapoel Nahliel |
| Maccabi Tamra | 1–1 (a.e.t.) 2–3 p. | Maccabi Isfiya |
| Maccabi Shefa-'Amr | 1–0 | Beitar Haifa |
| Hapoel Migdal HaEmek | 5–2 | Hapoel Ramot Menashe Megiddo |
| Ironi Bnei Julis | 0–4 | Hapoel Ra'anana |
| Hapoel Tel Hanan | 4–1 | Maccabi Hadera |
| Hapoel Hurfeish | 0–0 (a.e.t.) 1–3 p. | Hapoel Umm al-Fahm |
| Hapoel Bnei Lakhish | 4–2 (a.e.t.) | Hapoel Ihud Tzeirei Jaffa |
| Maccabi Bnei Tira | 2–1 | Maccabi Yavne |
| Hapoel Mevaseret Zion | 2–1 | A.S. Ramat Eliyahu |
| Maccabi Bat Yam | 2–4 | Hapoel Kfar Shalem |
| Shimshon Tel Aviv | 3–0 | Maccabi Montefiore |
| Hapoel Jaljulia | 0–2 | Maccabi Ashkelon |
| Maccabi Lazarus Holon | 5–1 | Hapoel Gan Yavne |
| Hapoel Ramat Gan | 3–0 | Hapoel Kiryat Malakhi |

=== Seventh Round ===
| Home team | Score | Away team |
|---|---|---|
| Hapoel Ra'anana | 3–0 | Hapoel Ramat Gan |
| Beitar Be'er Sheva | 5–1 | Maccabi Ashkelon |
| Hapoel Bat Yam | 5–2 | Hapoel Umm al-Fahm |
| Maccabi Isfiya | 0–4 (a.e.t.) | Shimshon Tel Aviv |
| Hapoel Ashkelon | 3–1 | Sektzia Nes Tziona |
| Hapoel Tayibe | 1–0 | Hapoel Ashdod |
| Maccabi Acre | 1–0 | Hapoel Lod |
| Hapoel Migdal HaEmek | 3–1 | Maccabi Ahi Nazareth |
| Hapoel Be'er Sheva | 2–0 | Bnei Sakhnin |
| Maccabi Lazarus Holon | 3–2 | Maccabi Kiryat Gat |
| Hapoel Bnei Lakhish | 2–1 | Hapoel Mevaseret Zion |
| Hapoel Kfar Shalem | 1–1 (a.e.t.) 4–1 p. | Hapoel Majd al-Krum |
| Maccabi Netanya | 2–0 | Hapoel Kafr Sumei |
| Maccabi Bnei Tira | 1–0 (a.e.t.) | Hapoel Tel Hanan |
| Hakoah Maccabi Ramat Gan | 6–2 | Beitar Tel Aviv |
| Maccabi Shefa-'Amr | 1–3 | Maccabi Kafr Kanna |

=== Eighth Round ===
| Home team | Score | Away team |
|---|---|---|
| Maccabi Haifa | 6–1 | Hapoel Bat Yam |
| Hapoel Bnei Lakhish | 1–1 (a.e.t.) 1–4 p. | Hapoel Beit She'an |
| Maccabi Bnei Tira | 0–6 | Hapoel Tel Aviv |
| Beitar Jerusalem | 7–0 | Hapoel Kfar Shalem |
| Maccabi Lazarus Holon | 0–5 | Hapoel Haifa |
| Maccabi Netanya | 0–1 | Hapoel Tzafririm Holon |
| Bnei Yehuda | 1–0 | Shimshon Tel Aviv |
| Hapoel Tayibe | 0–8 | Maccabi Herzliya |
| Hapoel Petah Tikva | 2–0 | Beitar Be'er Sheva |
| Maccabi Jaffa | 1–1 (a.e.t.) 1–3 p. | Hapoel Be'er Sheva |
| Hapoel Ra'anana | 1–3 (a.e.t.) | Maccabi Tel Aviv |
| Hapoel Ashkelon | 0–1 | Hapoel Jerusalem |
| Ironi Rishon LeZion | 3–2 | Hakoah Maccabi Ramat Gan |
| Hapoel Migdal HaEmek | 0–2 | Maccabi Ironi Ashdod |
| Maccabi Petah Tikva | 2–1 | Maccabi Kafr Kanna |
| Hapoel Kfar Saba | 2–0 | Maccabi Acre |

=== Round of 16 ===
| Home team | Score | Away team |
|---|---|---|
| Maccabi Tel Aviv | 0–2 | Hapoel Petah Tikva |
| Bnei Yehuda | 2–0 | Maccabi Petah Tikva |
| Maccabi Herzliya | 5–1 | Hapoel Beit She'an |
| Ironi Rishon LeZion | 2–3 | Beitar Jerusalem |
| Hapoel Haifa | 2–0 | Maccabi Ironi Ashdod |
| Hapoel Jerusalem | 1–5 | Hapoel Kfar Saba |
| Hapoel Be'er Sheva | 0–2 | Hapoel Tel Aviv |
| Maccabi Haifa | 4–1 | Hapoel Tzafririm Holon |

=== Quarter-finals ===
| Home team | Score | Away team |
|---|---|---|
| Hapoel Petah Tikva | 1–0 | Maccabi Herzliya |
| Bnei Yehuda | 3–2 | Hapoel Haifa |
| Maccabi Haifa | 1–5 (a.e.t.) | Beitar Jerusalem |
| Hapoel Kfar Saba | 0–3 | Hapoel Tel Aviv |

=== Semi-finals ===
| Home team | Score | Away team |
|---|---|---|
| Beitar Jerusalem | 4–2 | Bnei Yehuda |
| Hapoel Tel Aviv | 2–0 | Hapoel Petah Tikva |

=== Final ===
19 May 1999

| Hapoel Tel Aviv | 1–1 (a.e.t.) | Beitar Jerusalem |
|---|---|---|
| Tikva 33' | | Sivilia 6' |
Penalties
| | 3–1 |

Ramat Gan Stadium
Attendance: 33000
Referee: Koren
