= 1993–94 Israel State Cup =

Tournament details
- Country: Israel

Final positions
- Champions: Maccabi Tel Aviv (18th title)
- Runners-up: Hapoel Tel Aviv

The 1993–94 Israel State Cup (Hebrew: גביע המדינה, Gvia HaMedina) was the 55th season of Israel's nationwide football cup competition and the 40th after the Israeli Declaration of Independence.

The competition was won by Maccabi Tel Aviv who had beaten Hapoel Tel Aviv 2–0 in the final.

By winning, Maccabi Tel Aviv qualified to the 1994–95 UEFA Cup Winners' Cup, entering in the qualifying round.

== Results ==
=== Eighth Round ===
Home team	Score	Away team
Beitar Tel Aviv	2–3	Maccabi Tel Aviv
Bnei Yehuda	4–1	Ironi Rishon LeZion
Hapoel Ashdod	2–3	Maccabi Herzliya
Hapoel Jerusalem	0–3	Beitar Jerusalem
Hapoel Kfar Saba	2–1	Hapoel Bat Yam
Hapoel Migdal HaEmek	0–3	Hapoel Haifa
Hapoel Tel Aviv	7–1	Hapoel Arraba
Hapoel Tirat HaCarmel	3–4	Hapoel Petah Tikva
Hapoel Tzafririm Holon	8–1	Hapoel Nazareth Illit
Maccabi Haifa	3–0	Maccabi Acre
Maccabi Ironi Ashdod	6–1	Hapoel Ihud Tzeirei Jaffa
Maccabi Netanya	2–0	Shimshon Tel Aviv
Maccabi Petah Tikva	5–1	Sektzia Nes Tziona
Maccabi Yavne	2–1	Hapoel Be'er Sheva

Byes: Hapoel Ashkelon, Hapoel Tayibe.

=== Round of 16 ===
Home team	Score	Away team
Bnei Yehuda	5–1	Hapoel Kfar Saba
Beitar Jerusalem	0–0 (a.e.t.) 3–5 p.	Maccabi Petah Tikva
Maccabi Ironi Ashdod	5–1	Maccabi Yavne
Hapoel Tel Aviv	2–1	Hapoel Tayibe
Hapoel Tzafririm Holon	2–1	Maccabi Herzliya
Hapoel Ashkelon	2–3	Hapoel Petah Tikva
Maccabi Haifa	1–2	Maccabi Tel Aviv
Hapoel Haifa	2–0	Maccabi Netanya

=== Quarter-finals ===
Home team	Score	Away team
Bnei Yehuda	0–2	Maccabi Tel Aviv
Hapoel Tel Aviv	4–1	Hapoel Haifa
Maccabi Ironi Ashdod	0–1	Hapoel Tzafririm Holon
Hapoel Petah Tikva	0–2	Maccabi Petah Tikva

=== Semi-finals ===
Home team	Score	Away team
Maccabi Tel Aviv	3–3 (a.e.t.) 5–4 p.	Hapoel Tzafririm Holon
Hapoel Tel Aviv	1–1 (a.e.t.) 3–1 p.	Maccabi Petah Tikva

=== Final ===
7 June 1994

Maccabi Tel Aviv	2–0	Hapoel Tel Aviv
Zohar 49'; Klinger 71'

Ramat Gan Stadium
Attendance: 30000
Referee: Lefkovich
