= 1935 Palestine Cup =

Tournament details
- Country: Mandatory Palestine
- Teams: 6

Final positions
- Champions: Maccabi Avshalom Petah Tikva
- Runners-up: Hakoah Tel Aviv

Tournament statistics
- Matches played: 5
- Goals scored: 25 (5 per match)

The 1935 Palestine Cup (Hebrew: הגביע הארץ-ישראלי, HaGavia HaEretz-Israeli) was the seventh season of Israeli Football Association's nationwide football cup competition.

The defending holders were Hapoel Tel Aviv. However, Hapoel Tel Aviv chose not to participate in this edition and defend the title. With six teams participating in the competition, the draw for the quarter-finals and semi-finals was held on 21 May 1935, with the two quarter-final matches being played on 1 June 1935.

Surprise contestants Maccabi Avshalom Petah Tikva and Hakoah Tel Aviv met at the final in the Maccabiah Stadium, with Petah Tikva winning by the odd goal.

== Results ==
=== Quarter-finals ===
1 June 1935	Hakoah Tel Aviv	5–1	Maccabi Nes Tziona	Tel Aviv
				Stadium: Maccabiah Stadium; Referee: Dr. Schtrau

1 June 1935	Maccabi Petah Tikva	w/o (Note: The match was abandoned at about the 70th minute, when Maccabi Tel Aviv players protested a decision made by the referee. The result when the match was abandoned was 2–2)	Maccabi Tel Aviv	Tel Aviv
				Stadium: Maccabiah Stadium; Referee: Lumek

Maccabi Hashmonai and Hapoel Haifa received a bye to the semi-finals.

=== Semi-finals ===
22 June 1935	Hakoah Tel Aviv	3–2 (a.e.t.)	Hapoel Haifa	Tel Aviv
				Stadium: Maccabiah Stadium

6 July 1935	Maccabi Hashmonai	1–8	Maccabi Petah Tikva	Jerusalem
				Stadium: YMCA Stadium; Attendance: 1,200; Referee: Marcus

=== Final ===
13 July 1935

Hakoah Tel Aviv	0–1	Maccabi Avshalom Petah Tikva
		Oref 15'

Maccabiah Stadium
Attendance: 5000
Referee: Marcus
