= 1930 Palestine Cup =

1930 football tournament season

1930 Palestine Cup/Erez Israeli cup
Tournament details
- Country: Mandatory Palestine

Final positions
- Champions: Maccabi Tel Aviv B (2nd title)
- Runners-up: Northamptonshire Regiment

The 1930 Palestine Cup (Hebrew: הגביע הארץ-ישראלי, HaGavia HaEretz-Israeli) was the third season of Israeli Football Association's nationwide football cup competition. The defending holders were Maccabi Tel Aviv.

For the second (and last) season, teams were allowed to enter their reserve teams, and such teams were entered on behalf of Hapoel Haifa, Hapoel Tel Aviv and Maccabi Tel Aviv. Maccabi's B team eventually won the cup, a feat achieve by fielding the stronger A team under the guise of the B team. This was allowed as the club chose to forfeit their A team's first round tie away against Hapoel Haifa B, while the B team won their tie easily, and thus keeping their A team from being cup-tied and allowing their A Team players to play for the B team for the remainder of the competition.

Maccabi Tel Aviv B (as registered) won the cup, beating the British team of the Northamptonshire Regiment 2–1 in the final, which was held on Hapoel Tel Aviv ground.

== Results ==
=== First round ===
First round matches started on 15 February 1930. The rest of the matches were played the following Saturday. The replay between British Police and RAF Amman was delayed as the soldiers were in military duty, and was finally played on 8 March 1930.

Home team	Score	Away team
Hapoel Tel Aviv B	0–10	South Staffords
Maccabi Tel Aviv B	4–0 (Note: The match was abandoned at half-time, at the request of Maccabi Zikhron Ya'akov, and due to the weather conditions.)	Maccabi Zikhron Ya'akov
Hapoel Haifa B	w/o	Maccabi Tel Aviv
Maccabi Avshalom Petah Tikva	9–1	Maccabi Herzliya
British Police	2–2	RAF Amman
Hapoel Tel Aviv	3–0	Hapoel Haifa
Islamic Haifa	2–7	Northamptonshire Regiment
Maccabi Hasmonean Jerusalem	2–1	YMCA Jerusalem

==== Replay ====
Home team	Score	Away team
British Police	4–2	RAF Amman

=== Quarter-finals ===
The quarter-finals matches started on 1 March 1930.

Home team	Score	Away team
Maccabi Hasmonean Jerusalem	1–4	South Staffords
Maccabi Avshalom Petah Tikva	0–3	Northamptonshire Regiment
Hapoel Tel Aviv	w/o	Hapoel Haifa B
Maccabi Tel Aviv B	4–3	British Police

=== Semi-finals ===
Home team	Score	Away team
Northamptonshire Regiment	2–0	Hapoel Tel Aviv
Maccabi Tel Aviv B	3–1	South Staffords

=== Final ===
3 May 1930

Maccabi Tel Aviv B	2–1	Northamptonshire Regiment
Bachar 20'; Heresh 88'	Do'ar HaYom; Davar	32' Pierce

Hapoel Ground, Tel Aviv
Attendance: 8000
Referee: MacKenzie
