= 1986–87 Israel State Cup =

Tournament details
- Country: Israel

Final positions
- Champions: Maccabi Tel Aviv (16th title)
- Runners-up: Maccabi Haifa

The 1986–87 Israel State Cup (Hebrew: גביע המדינה, Gvia HaMedina) was the 48th season of Israel's nationwide football cup competition and the 33rd after the Israeli Declaration of Independence.

The competition was won by Maccabi Tel Aviv who have beaten Maccabi Haifa 4–3 on penalties after 3–3 draw in the final.

== Results ==
=== Sixth Round ===
Home team	Score	Away team
Hapoel Or Yehuda	0–1	Hapoel Azor
Hapoel Tirat HaCarmel	0–2	Hapoel Kiryat Shmona
Hapoel Kiryat Ata	4–0	Hapoel Aliyah Kfar Saba
Hapoel Ofakim	5–1	Maccabi Kiryat Malakhi
Hapoel Kafr Manda	1–0	Maccabi Or Akiva
Hapoel Ar'ara	1–1 (a.e.t.) 3–4 p.	Hapoel Tayibe
Beitar Haifa	2–0	Hapoel Daliyat al-Karmel
Hapoel Bat Yam	0–0 (a.e.t.) 4–3 p.	SK Nes Tziona
Hapoel Givat Olga	1–2	Hapoel Ra'anana
Hapoel Kiryat Malakhi	1–3	Beitar Be'er Sheva
Beitar Kfar Yona	2–1	Hapoel Nahlat Yehuda
Hapoel Yeruham	0–0 (a.e.t.) 2–3 p.	Hapoel Be'er Ya'akov
M.M. Giv'at Shmuel	1–3	Hapoel Ramat HaSharon
Hapoel Nazareth Illit	1–2	Hapoel Deir Hanna
Hapoel Karmiel	0–0 (a.e.t.) 2–4 p.	Hapoel Bnei Nazareth
Hapoel Rishon LeZion	0–0 (a.e.t.) 4–3 p.	Beitar Petah Tikva

=== Seventh Round ===
Home team	Score	Away team
Hapoel Bat Yam	1–3	Hapoel Be'er Ya'akov
Beitar Nahariya	2–0	Hapoel Deir Hanna
Hapoel Beit She'an	6–1	Hapoel Rishon LeZion
Hapoel Ofakim	2–4	Hapoel Tiberias
Hapoel Azor	0–1	Beitar Haifa
Hapoel Ramat Gan	1–1, replay: 0–2	Hapoel Jerusalem
Hapoel Dimona	1–1, replay: 0–0, 3–4 p.	Hapoel Tayibe
Hapoel Ramat HaSharon	4–1	Hapoel Kiryat Ata
Hapoel Acre	2–1	Hapoel Bnei Nazareth
Hapoel Tzafririm Holon	2–1	Hapoel Haifa
Beitar Ramla	1–0	Hapoel Kiryat Shmona
Hapoel Hadera	2–0	Hapoel Yehud
Hapoel Kafr Manda	1–8	Hapoel Marmorek
Maccabi Ramat Amidar	1–2	Maccabi Sha'arayim
Hakoah Maccabi Ramat Gan	1–0	Beitar Kfar Yona
Hapoel Ra'anana	3–0	Beitar Be'er Sheva

=== Eighth Round ===
Home team	Score	Away team
Maccabi Yavne	1–2	Hapoel Tzafririm Holon
Beitar Ramla	1–1, replay: 1–2	Maccabi Tel Aviv
Beitar Jerusalem	2–0	Beitar Haifa
Hapoel Tel Aviv	2–0	Hapoel Ramat HaSharon
Hakoah Maccabi Ramat Gan	1–1, replay: 1–2 (a.e.t.)	Hapoel Kfar Saba
Beitar Nahariya	0–2	Shimshon Tel Aviv
Hapoel Marmorek	0–1	Maccabi Petah Tikva
Maccabi Netanya	2–1	Hapoel Acre
Beitar Netanya	1–1, replay: 1–6	Hapoel Jerusalem
Hapoel Hadera	4–2 (a.e.t.)	Hapoel Lod
Beitar Tel Aviv	3–1	Maccabi Sha'arayim
Hapoel Petah Tikva	4–0	Hapoel Be'er Ya'akov
Maccabi Haifa	3–0	Hapoel Beit She'an
Hapoel Tiberias	1–0	Hapoel Be'er Sheva
Hapoel Tayibe	1–1, replay: 0–2 (a.e.t.)	Maccabi Jaffa
Hapoel Ra'anana	0–1 (a.e.t.)	Bnei Yehuda

=== Round of 16 ===
Home team	Score	Away team
Maccabi Netanya	2–0	Shimshon Tel Aviv
Hapoel Tel Aviv	1–2	Maccabi Tel Aviv
Maccabi Petah Tikva	0–0, replay: 0–0, 3–4 p.	Hapoel Petah Tikva
Hapoel Kfar Saba	1–1, replay: 2–1	Hapoel Tiberias
Hapoel Hadera	0–0, replay: 0–1	Maccabi Jaffa
Beitar Jerusalem	1–0	Bnei Yehuda
Hapoel Jerusalem	0–2	Maccabi Haifa
Hapoel Tzafririm Holon	0–0, replay: 1–3	Beitar Tel Aviv

=== Quarter-finals ===
Home team	Score	Away team
Beitar Jerusalem	1–0	Hapoel Kfar Saba
Beitar Tel Aviv	2–0	Maccabi Netanya
Maccabi Haifa	1–0	Hapoel Petah Tikva
Maccabi Tel Aviv	3–1	Maccabi Jaffa

=== Semi-finals ===
Home team	Score	Away team
Maccabi Tel Aviv	2–0	Beitar Jerusalem
Maccabi Haifa	0–0 (a.e.t.) 4–2 p.	Beitar Tel Aviv

=== Final ===
9 June 1987

Maccabi Tel Aviv	3–3 (a.e.t.)	Maccabi Haifa
Gariani 54'; Driks 72', 113'	Report; Highlights	Armeli 64', 101'; Selecter 85'
Penalties
Nathan (penalty scored); Goldberg (penalty scored); M. Cohen (penalty missed); Driks (penalty scored); Tabak (penalty scored)	4–3	(penalty missed) Merili; (penalty missed) Armeli; (penalty scored) Selecter; (penalty scored) Brailovsky; (penalty scored) Klinger

Ramat Gan Stadium
Attendance: 15000
Referee: Ashkenazi
