= 1995–96 Israel State Cup =

Tournament details
- Country: Israel

Final positions
- Champions: Maccabi Tel Aviv (19th title)
- Runners-up: Ironi Rishon LeZion

The 1995–96 Israel State Cup (Hebrew: גביע המדינה, Gvia HaMedina) was the 57th season of Israel's nationwide football cup competition and the 42nd after the Israeli Declaration of Independence.

The competition was won by Maccabi Tel Aviv who had beaten Ironi Rishon LeZion 4–1 in the final.

As Maccabi Tel Aviv won the double, Ironi Rishon LeZion qualified to the 1996–97 UEFA Cup Winners' Cup, entering in the qualifying round.

== Results ==
=== Seventh Round ===
Home team	Score	Away team
Hapoel Ihud Tzeirei Jaffa	3–1	Hapoel Tayibe
Maccabi Ironi Ashdod	8–2	Maccabi Kiryat Gat
Hakoah Maccabi Ramat Gan	0–1	Sektzia Nes Tziona
Hapoel Hadera	0–1	Hapoel Jerusalem
Beitar Lod	0–3	Beitar Be'er Sheva
Hapoel Majd al-Krum	0–1 (a.e.t.)	Hapoel Kfar Shalem
Maccabi Sha'arayim	2–2 (a.e.t.) 5–4 p.	Maccabi Kafr Qasim
Maccabi Kafr Kanna	0–3	Shimshon Tel Aviv
Beitar Hatzor	2–5	Maccabi Yavne
Hapoel Bir al-Maksur	1–0 (a.e.t.)	Maccabi Ramat HaSharon
Hapoel Ashdod	3–0	Maccabi Shefa-'Amr
Hapoel Bat Yam	3–0	Maccabi Baqa al-Gharbiyye
Hapoel Kiryat Malakhi	0–3	Hapoel Kiryat Shmona
Hapoel Kiryat Ono	0–3	Maccabi Acre
Maccabi Netanya	1–0	Maccabi Isfiya
Hapoel Umm al-Fahm	1–2	Hapoel Ramat Gan

=== Eighth Round ===
Home team	Score	Away team
Bnei Yehuda	5–0	Hapoel Bir al-Maksur
Maccabi Haifa	6–4	Sektzia Nes Tziona
Hapoel Ihud Tzeirei Jaffa	1–6	Beitar Jerusalem
Hapoel Beit She'an	2–1	Beitar Be'er Sheva
Maccabi Netanya	1–3	Maccabi Herzliya
Hapoel Ashdod	0–2	Maccabi Petah Tikva
Hapoel Haifa	2–1	Hapoel Bat Yam
Maccabi Ironi Ashdod	1–0	Hapoel Kfar Saba
Maccabi Tel Aviv	1–0	Hapoel Jerusalem
Maccabi Yavne	0–1	Ironi Rishon LeZion
Maccabi Sha'arayim	0–0 (a.e.t.) 5–4 p.	Hapoel Petah Tikva
Hapoel Be'er Sheva	1–2	Hapoel Kiryat Shmona
Hapoel Tel Aviv	3–4 (a.e.t.)	Maccabi Acre
Maccabi Jaffa	0–1	Hapoel Ramat Gan
Shimshon Tel Aviv	0–3 (a.e.t.)	Hapoel Tzafririm Holon
Hapoel Kfar Shalem	1–2	Beitar Tel Aviv

=== Round of 16 ===
Home team	Score	Away team
Hapoel Ramat Gan	1–2	Bnei Yehuda
Maccabi Herzliya	1–2 (a.e.t.)	Beitar Jerusalem
Ironi Rishon LeZion	3–0	Hapoel Beit She'an
Hapoel Kiryat Shmona	0–1	Maccabi Petah Tikva
Hapoel Haifa	0–1	Maccabi Tel Aviv
Maccabi Sha'arayim	1–1 (a.e.t.) 5–4 p.	Maccabi Ironi Ashdod
Maccabi Haifa	2–0	Maccabi Acre
Hapoel Tzafririm Holon	0–0 (a.e.t.) 4–5 p.	Beitar Tel Aviv

=== Quarter-finals ===
Home team	Score	Away team
Maccabi Sha'arayim	1–4	Maccabi Haifa
Bnei Yehuda	3–1	Maccabi Petah Tikva
Beitar Jerusalem	0–1	Maccabi Tel Aviv
Beitar Tel Aviv	1–2 (a.e.t.)	Ironi Rishon LeZion

=== Semi-finals ===
Home team	Score	Away team
Ironi Rishon LeZion	4–1	Bnei Yehuda
Maccabi Tel Aviv	2–1	Maccabi Haifa

=== Final ===
28 May 1996

Maccabi Tel Aviv	4–1	Ironi Rishon LeZion
Nimni 14'; Driks 24'; A. Brumer 29'; Melika 59'		Kapeta 87'

Bloomfield Stadium, Tel Aviv
Attendance: 15000
Referee: Ben Itzhak
