= Dates Ground =

Former football ground in Tel Aviv, Israel

Dates Ground מגרש התמרים
- The Dates Ground
- Interactive map of Dates Ground מגרש התמרים
- Location: Tel Aviv, Israel
- Coordinates: 32°4′1.4″N 34°47′24.9″E

Construction
- Opened: 1941
- Closed: 1949

Tenants
- Hapoel Tel Aviv (1941-1949); Hakoah Tel Aviv (1942–1943); Hapoel HaTzafon Tel Aviv (1946–1947)

The Dates Ground (Hebrew: מגרש התמרים), also known as Hapoel Ground (Hebrew: מגרש הפועל) was a football ground in the Montefiore neighborhood of Tel Aviv, Israel. The ground was in use between 1941 and 1949, and was abandoned when the club moved to play in an already built stadium in Jaffa, on which the current Bloomfield Stadium stands.

== See also ==
- Sports in Israel
