= 1983–84 Israel State Cup =

Tournament details
- Country: Israel

Final positions
- Champions: Hapoel Lod
- Runners-up: Hapoel Be'er Sheva

The 1983–84 Israel State Cup (Hebrew: גביע המדינה, Gvia HaMedina) was the 45th season of Israel's nationwide football cup competition and the 30th after the Israeli Declaration of Independence.

The competition was won by Hapoel Lod who have beaten Hapoel Be'er Sheva 3–2 on penalties after 0–0 in the final.

== Results ==
=== Fifth Round ===
Home team	Score	Away team
Beitar Netanya	6–1	Maccabi Zikhron Ya'akov
Maccabi Afula	2–0	Maccabi Shefa-'Amr
Maccabi HaShikma Ramat Gan	2–0	Maccabi Lazarus Holon
Hapoel Tzafririm Holon	1–0 (a.e.t.)	Beitar Be'er Sheva
Hapoel Migdal HaEmek	3–3 (a.e.t.) 2–3 p.	Bnei Hatzor
Ironi Ashdod	2–1 (a.e.t.)	Hapoel Yeruham
Maccabi Herzliya	1–0	Maccabi Kiryat Gat
Hapoel Ra'anana	0–1	Hapoel Acre
Hapoel Tiberias	1–3	Hapoel Tirat HaCarmel
Hapoel Ramla	2–0	Hapoel Kiryat Malakhi
Maccabi Acre	1–0	Hapoel Nahariya
Bnei Tamra	2–1	Beitar Nahariya
Hapoel Givat Olga	6–2	Hapoel Kafr Qara
Maccabi Be'er Sheva	2–1	Maccabi Rehovot
Hapoel Merhavim	1–1 (a.e.t.) 4–1 p.	Hapoel Be'er Ya'akov
Hapoel Bat Yam	3–3 (a.e.t.) 4–3 p.	Maccabi Kiryat Ekron

=== Sixth Round ===
Home team	Score	Away team
Hapoel Rishon LeZion	2–3	Maccabi Be'er Sheva
Hapoel Kfar Saba	0–1	Hapoel Hadera
Hapoel Nazareth Illit	2–3	Hapoel Kiryat Shmona
Hapoel Beit Shemesh	1–2	Hapoel Acre
Hapoel Tzafririm Holon	1–1, replay: 2–7	Hapoel Jerusalem
Maccabi Herzliya	0–3	Hapoel Ramat Gan
Bnei Tamra	0–1	Beitar Haifa
Hapoel Petah Tikva	3–1	Hapoel Marmorek
Hapoel Ramla	1–1, replay: 0–1	Hapoel Ashkelon
Hapoel Beit She'an	1–3 (a.e.t.)	Maccabi Acre
Maccabi Afula	1–1, replay: 3–2 (a.e.t.)	Hapoel Givat Olga
Beitar Ramla	1–0 (a.e.t.)	Ironi Ashdod
Hapoel Haifa	2–1	Hapoel Tirat HaCarmel
Maccabi HaShikma Ramat Gan	0–3	Hapoel Holon
Beitar Netanya	2–1	Hapoel Merhavim
Bnei Hatzor	2–1	Hapoel Bat Yam

=== Seventh Round ===
Home team	Score	Away team
Bnei Yehuda	1–2	Hapoel Holon
Hapoel Petah Tikva	1–0	Maccabi Ramat Amidar
Maccabi Yavne	2–1	Hapoel Ashkelon
Beitar Ramla	1–0	Hakoah Maccabi Ramat Gan
Shimshon Tel Aviv	1–0	Maccabi Acre
Hapoel Yehud	0–2	Hapoel Haifa
Beitar Haifa	0–2	Hapoel Tel Aviv
Beitar Jerusalem	7–0	Bnei Hatzor
Maccabi Afula	0–1	Beitar Tel Aviv
Hapoel Acre	0–0, replay: 0–4	Hapoel Lod
Hapoel Jerusalem	0–2	Maccabi Haifa
Hapoel Hadera	1–1, replay: 1–3	Maccabi Jaffa
Maccabi Tel Aviv	7–1	Maccabi Be'er Sheva
Hapoel Kiryat Shmona	0–2	Maccabi Petah Tikva
Maccabi Netanya	4–1	Beitar Netanya
Hapoel Be'er Sheva	3–1 (a.e.t.)	Hapoel Ramat Gan

=== Round of 16 ===
Home team	Score	Away team
Beitar Tel Aviv	0–2	Hapoel Tel Aviv
Hapoel Holon	0–1	Hapoel Lod
Maccabi Netanya	2–1	Shimshon Tel Aviv
Hapoel Be'er Sheva	3–1	Maccabi Yavne
Maccabi Petah Tikva	2–1	Beitar Ramla
Hapoel Petah Tikva	0–0, replay: 0–1	Beitar Jerusalem
Hapoel Haifa	3–1	Maccabi Jaffa
Maccabi Tel Aviv	2–1	Maccabi Haifa

=== Quarter-finals ===
Home team	Score	Away team
Beitar Jerusalem	2–2, replay: 1–2	Hapoel Lod
Hapoel Haifa	0–0, replay: 1–4	Maccabi Tel Aviv
Hapoel Tel Aviv	2–2, replay: 2–2, 3–4 p.	Hapoel Be'er Sheva
Maccabi Netanya	5–1	Maccabi Petah Tikva

=== Semi-finals ===
Home team	Score	Away team
Hapoel Lod	2–1	Maccabi Tel Aviv
Hapoel Be'er Sheva	2–0	Maccabi Netanya

=== Final ===
3 June 1984

Hapoel Lod	0–0 (a.e.t.)	Hapoel Be'er Sheva
Penalties
	3–2

Ramat Gan Stadium
Attendance: 15000
Referee: Prost
