= 1932 Palestine Cup =

Tournament details
- Country: Mandatory Palestine

Final positions
- Champions: British Police
- Runners-up: Hapoel Haifa

The 1932 Palestine Cup (Hebrew: הגביע הארץ-ישראלי, HaGavia HaEretz-Israeli) was the fourth season of the Palestine Football Association's nationwide football cup competition. The defending holders were Maccabi Tel Aviv (B).

For the first time in 5 years, and the first time since the founding of the Eretz Israel Football Association, a British team, British Police, won the cup, completing a double, as the team also won the league.

In the final, held in Petah Tikva, British Police met Hapoel Haifa. The match was abandoned at the 38th minute, with the score at 1–0 to Hapoel Haifa, and was awarded to the Policemen.

== Results ==
=== First round ===
| Home team | Score | Away team |
|---|---|---|
| P.G.H. Sarafand | 0–3 | Hapoel Haifa |
| Maccabi Haifa | 2–4 | British Police |
| Maccabi Avshalom Petah Tikva | 3–2 | Maccabi Tel Aviv |
| No. 2 Armoured Car Coy | 1–1 | Middlesex Regiment |

==== Replay ====
| Home team | Score | Away team |
|---|---|---|
| Middlesex Regiment | 0–1 | No. 2 Armoured Car Coy |

=== Quarter-finals ===
| Home team | Score | Away team |
|---|---|---|
| Hapoel Tel Aviv | 3–1 | No. 2 Armoured Car Coy |
| King's Own Regiment | 6–0 | Maccabi Nes Tziona |
| British Police | 3–2 | Maccabi Avshalom Petah Tikva |
| Maccabi Hasmonean Jerusalem | 0–3 | Hapoel Haifa |

=== Semi-finals ===
| Home team | Score | Away team |
|---|---|---|
| Hapoel Haifa | 2–0 | Hapoel Tel Aviv |
| British Police | w/o | King's Own Regiment |

=== Final ===
| 7 May 1932 | Hapoel Haifa | w/o (1–0) (abandoned '37) | British Police | Maccabi Avshalem Petah Tikva field |
| | Gaist 22' | | | Attendance: 7,000; Referee: MacKenzie |
