= 1987–88 Israel State Cup =

Tournament details
- Country: Israel

Final positions
- Champions: Maccabi Tel Aviv (17th title)
- Runners-up: Hapoel Tel Aviv

The 1987–88 Israel State Cup (Hebrew: גביע המדינה, Gvia HaMedina) was the 49th season of Israel's nationwide football cup competition and the 34th after the Israeli Declaration of Independence.

The competition was won by Maccabi Tel Aviv who have beaten Hapoel Tel Aviv 2–1 in the final.

== Results ==
=== Round of 16 ===
Home team	Score	Away team
Maccabi Netanya	9–0	Hapoel Kafr Sumei
Maccabi Tel Aviv	4–0	Hapoel Jerusalem
Hapoel Petah Tikva	3–1	Maccabi Petah Tikva
Hapoel Tel Aviv	3–1	Hapoel Tiberias
Hapoel Be'er Sheva	6–1	Hapoel Yehud
Shimshon Tel Aviv	1–0	Bnei Yehuda
Beitar Tel Aviv	3–2	Maccabi Haifa
Hapoel Tzafririm Holon	1–0	Hapoel Haifa

=== Quarter-finals ===
Home team	Score	Away team
Maccabi Netanya	1–0	Hapoel Tzafririm Holon
Hapoel Tel Aviv	2–2, replay: 3–2	Beitar Tel Aviv
Shimshon Tel Aviv	1–1, replay: 1–1, 3–2 p.	Hapoel Petah Tikva
Maccabi Tel Aviv	1–0	Hapoel Be'er Sheva

=== Semi-finals ===
Home team	Score	Away team
Maccabi Tel Aviv	1–1 (a.e.t.) 3–1 p.	Shimshon Tel Aviv
Hapoel Tel Aviv	1–1 (a.e.t.) 4–3 p.	Maccabi Netanya

=== Final ===
7 June 1988

Maccabi Tel Aviv	2–1	Hapoel Tel Aviv
Cohen 39'; Tabak 49'		Ben Shitrit 25'

Ramat Gan Stadium
Attendance: 20000
Referee: Scheiner
