= Palms Ground =

Former football ground in Tel Aviv, Israel

Palms Ground מגרש הדקלים
- Interactive map of Palms Ground מגרש הדקלים
- Former names: Maccabi Ground (1923-1926); Hapoel Ground (1929-1941)
- Location: Tel Aviv, Israel
- Coordinates: 32°3′24.7″N 34°45′55.1″E

Construction
- Opened: 24 December 1923
- Closed: 1941

Tenants
- Maccabi Tel Aviv (1923-1926); Hapoel Tel Aviv (1927-1941)

The Palms Ground (Hebrew: מגרש הדקלים) was a football ground in the Florentin neighborhood of Tel Aviv, Israel. The ground was first known as Maccabi Ground and later as Hapoel Ground, but was nicknamed Palms Ground after the palms surrounding it.

== History ==
Maccabi Tel Aviv played its matches on a ground leased from an Arab landlord where Meir Park stands today up until summer 1923. When the lease ended Maccabi leased another ground in south-east Tel Aviv on which the Palms Ground was built. The ground was opened in a match between Maccabi and a team from the RAF Armoured Car Company that was based in Sarafand on 16 December 1923. Maccabi used the ground until its lease ended in 1926. In April 1927 Hapoel Tel Aviv leased the ground, and celebreated its inauguration with a match against a team from the Palestine Police Force. Hapoel played on the ground until 1941, when due to security concerns arising from the proximity of the ground to Jaffa, Hapoel moved to its new ground in 1941, after which the ground was abandoned and was built over.

== Notable matches ==
- In January 1924 the visiting Hakoah Vienna played its first match in Palestine, winning over a Maccabi Tel Aviv 5–1. A year later, Hakoah made a second visit to Palestine, this time beating Maccabi 11–2.
- The ground hosted the Palestine Cup finals in 1930, in which Maccabi Tel Aviv had beaten a Northamptonshire Regiment XI 2–1.
- In 1934, the national team hosted its first ever home match on the ground, losing 1–4 against Egypt.

== See also ==
- Sports in Israel
