= 1944 Palestine Cup =

1944 Palestine Wartime Cup
Tournament details
- Country: Mandatory Palestine

Final positions
- Champions: Hapoel Tel Aviv
- Runners-up: Hapoel Petah Tikva

The 1944 Palestine Wartime Cup (Hebrew: הגביע המלחמתי, HaGavia HaMilhamti) was a special edition of the Palestine Cup, intended to be a standalone cup competition and not an Israel State Cup edition. However, the IFA recognize the title as part of the main competition.

Draw for the competition was held on 5 February 1944, without the participation of Beitar teams, which withdrew from the competition in protest over the EIFA treatment of Beitar Tel Aviv after the team's match against NSC Cairo in the previous summer.

Cup matches began on 20 February 1944, but delays caused the final to be played almost a year later, on 13 January 1945. In the final, Hapoel Tel Aviv had beaten Hapoel Petah Tikva 1–0.

== Results ==
=== First round ===
Home team	Score	Away team
Maccabi Tel Aviv	9–1	Hakoah Tel Aviv
Hapoel Rishon LeZion	1–7	Hapoel Petah Tikva
Hapoel Ramat Gan	0–3	Maccabi Rishon LeZion

=== Second round ===
Home team	Score	Away team
RAF XI	1–3	Hapoel Haifa
Maccabi Tel Aviv	1–2	Maccabi Rehovot
Maccabi Ramat Gan	2–6	Maccabi Rishon LeZion
Hapoel Itzhar Ramat Gan	1–1 (a.e.t.)	Maccabi Petah Tikva
Harari Tel Aviv	0–5	Hapoel Tel Aviv
Maccabi Nes Tziona	2–6	All-White
Maccabi Netanya	w/o	Hapoel Jerusalem
Hapoel Petah Tikva	2–0	Hapoel Rehovot

==== Replay ====
Home team	Score	Away team
Maccabi Petah Tikva	w/o	Hapoel Itzhar Ramat Gan

=== Quarter-final ===
Home team	Score	Away team
Hapoel Petah Tikva	3–1	Hapoel Haifa
Maccabi Nes Tziona	3–1	Maccabi Rishon LeZion
Maccabi Netanya	0–1 (abandoned) (Note: The match was abandoned as the crowd invaded the pitch. A replay was ordered.)	Maccabi Petah Tikva
Maccabi Rehovot	0–1	Hapoel Tel Aviv

==== Replay ====
Home team	Score	Away team
Maccabi Netanya	0–2	Maccabi Petah Tikva

=== Semi-finals ===
Home team	Score	Away team
Hapoel Petah Tikva	7–0	Maccabi Petah Tikva
Hapoel Tel Aviv	w/o (Note: In the match, which ended with a 2–2 draw, Maccabi Nes Tziona fielded Avraham Bogdanov from Beitar Tel Aviv, which was registered with the EIFA 3 days before the match. After the match, the EIFA rules that the played was ineligible for the match, as players had to be registered at least 4 days before a match, and Nes Tziona was disqualified.)	Maccabi Nes Tziona

=== Final ===
13 January 1945

Hapoel Petah Tikva	0–1 (abandoned '86)	Hapoel Tel Aviv
	Summary	Erlich 53'

Maccabiah Stadium, Tel Aviv
Attendance: 2,000
Referee: Burger
