= 1976–77 Israel State Cup =

Tournament details
- Country: Israel

Final positions
- Champions: Maccabi Tel Aviv (15th title)
- Runners-up: Beitar Tel Aviv

The 1976–77 Israel State Cup (Hebrew: גביע המדינה, Gvia HaMedina) was the 38th season of Israel's nationwide football cup competition and the 23rd after the Israeli Declaration of Independence.

The competition was won by Maccabi Tel Aviv, who have beaten Beitar Tel Aviv 1–0 at the final.

== Results ==
=== Fourth Round ===
Home team	Score	Away team
Bnei Yehuda	2–1 (a.e.t.)	Maccabi Ramat Amidar
Hapoel Lod	2–1	Hapoel Rishon LeZion
Maccabi Hadera	1–1; Abandoned	Hapoel Mahane Yehuda
Maccabi Sha'arayim	3–1 (a.e.t.)	Hapoel Holon
Hapoel Kiryat Ata	1–0	Hapoel Daliyat al-Karmel
Hapoel Ra'anana	8–1	Hapoel Arraba
Beitar Kiryat Shmona	0–2	Hapoel Hadera
Hapoel Bat Yam	1–1 (a.e.t.) 1–4 p.	Hapoel Yeruham
Beitar Netanya	4–1	Maccabi Hatzor
Hapoel Ashdod	2–0	Hapoel Sde Uzziah
Hapoel Rosh HaAyin	3–1	Hapoel Ashkelon
Hapoel Givat Haim	2–1	Hapoel Tel Hanan
Hapoel Petah Tikva	0–0 (a.e.t.) 10–9 p.	Hapoel Ramat Gan
Maccabi Kiryat Bialik	1–4	Hapoel Nazareth Illit
Maccabi HaShikma Ramat Gan	2–1	Hapoel HaTzafon Tel Aviv
Hapoel Marmorek	3–0	Hapoel Merhavim
Beitar Ramla	1–0	Hapoel Or Yehuda
Beitar Mahane Yehuda	2–1	Hapoel Kafr Qasim
Hapoel Majd al-Krum	3–2 (a.e.t.)	Maccabi Or Akiva
Hapoel Hatzor	0–2	Hapoel Tirat HaCarmel
Maccabi Yavne	1–3	Hapoel Dimona
Hapoel Kafr Qara	0–5	Hapoel Netanya

Byes: Hapoel Aliyah Kfar Saba, Hapoel Azor, Hapoel Beit Shemesh, Hapoel HaTzair Haifa, Hapoel Migdal HaEmek, Hapoel Nahariya, Maccabi Be'er Sheva, Maccabi Herzliya, Sektzia Ma'alot, SK Nes Tziona.

=== Fifth Round ===
Home team	Score	Away team
Hapoel Petah Tikva	6–1	Hapoel Ashdod
Maccabi Sha'arayim	1–0	Hapoel Marmorek
Hapoel Azor	3–0	Sektzia Ma'alot
Bnei Yehuda	4–0	Hapoel Migdal HaEmek
Hapoel Hadera	7–2	Beitar Mahane Yehuda
Hapoel Lod	2–2 (a.e.t.) 2–3 p.	Hapoel Beit Shemesh
Beitar Netanya	3–0	Hapoel Aliyah Kfar Saba
Maccabi HaShikma Ramat Gan	2–1 (a.e.t.)	Hapoel Nahariya
Maccabi Be'er Sheva	1–0	Hapoel Ra'anana
Hapoel Dimona	3–1	Hapoel Netanya
Maccabi Hadera	5–1	Maccabi Or Akiva
Hapoel Nazareth Illit	2–3 (a.e.t.)	Maccabi Herzliya
Beitar Ramla	2–1	SK Nes Tziona
Hapoel Rosh HaAyin	0–1	Hapoel Yeruham
Hapoel Kiryat Ata	1–0	Hapoel Givat Haim
Hapoel Tirat HaCarmel	2–0	Hapoel HaTzair Haifa

=== Sixth Round ===
Home team	Score	Away team
Maccabi Petah Tikva	1–0	Hapoel Petah Tikva
Hapoel Be'er Sheva	5–0	Bnei Yehuda
Maccabi Netanya	5–0	Hapoel Azor
Maccabi Sha'arayim	3–1	Hapoel Haifa
Beitar Netanya	0–2	Maccabi Tel Aviv
Beitar Jerusalem	0–1 (a.e.t.)	Hapoel Hadera
Hapoel Kiryat Ata	2–1 (a.e.t.)	Hapoel Yehud
Shimshon Tel Aviv	2–1	Hapoel Dimona
Beitar Tel Aviv	6–0	Maccabi Hadera
Maccabi Haifa	1–0	Maccabi Herzliya
Hapoel Kfar Saba	5–0	Beitar Ramla
Hapoel Tirat HaCarmel	1–0	Maccabi Jaffa
Hapoel Beit Shemesh	0–1	Hapoel Tel Aviv
Maccabi HaShikma Ramat Gan	0–2	Hapoel Acre
Hapoel Yeruham	1–2	Hapoel Jerusalem
Hakoah Maccabi Ramat Gan	1–1 (a.e.t.) 4–3 p.	Maccabi Be'er Sheva

=== Round of 16 ===
Home team	Score	Away team
Beitar Tel Aviv	2–1	Hakoah Maccabi Ramat Gan
Hapoel Acre	3–2	Hapoel Kiryat Ata
Hapoel Be'er Sheva	2–0	Maccabi Haifa
Maccabi Sha'arayim	0–1	Hapoel Hadera
Hapoel Tirat HaCarmel	2–3	Hapoel Kfar Saba
Hapoel Tel Aviv	1–0	Maccabi Petah Tikva
Maccabi Netanya	3–0	Hapoel Jerusalem
Maccabi Tel Aviv	2–0	Shimshon Tel Aviv

=== Quarter-finals ===
Home team	Score	Away team
Hapoel Acre	2–0	Hapoel Hadera
Beitar Tel Aviv	3–0	Hapoel Be'er Sheva
Hapoel Kfar Saba	0–2	Maccabi Tel Aviv
Maccabi Netanya	2–1	Hapoel Tel Aviv

=== Semi-finals ===
Home team	Score	Away team
Maccabi Tel Aviv	6–1	Maccabi Netanya
Beitar Tel Aviv	1–0	Hapoel Acre

=== Final ===
1 June 1977

Maccabi Tel Aviv	1–0	Beitar Tel Aviv
Tabak 30'

Ramat Gan Stadium
Attendance: 30000
Referee: Eitan
