= 1922–23 in Mandatory Palestine football =

Football in Mandatory Palestine
- Season: 1922–23

The following article is a summary of the 1922–23 football in Mandatory Palestine. As the local football association wasn't founded until July 1928, there were no officially organized competitions during the season.

== Overview ==
This season saw a great rise in footballing activity throughout the country. In the Hebrew sector, footballing sections in places such as Petah Tikva, Rishon LeZion, Haifa and Hadera. were resurrected, while new football clubs were formed, including the first Hapoel club, Hapoel Tel Aviv. In the Arab sector, the first conference of Orthodox Christian clubs and societies, held in July 1923, led to the establishment of the Orthodox Club in Jaffa, with other clubs following suit in later years.

The Jerusalem Sports Club organized a cup competition, which was competed mainly by British teams, along with Maccabi Tel Aviv. The cup was won the No. 14 Squadron RAF, which was stationed in Ramleh who had beaten a Haifa Train Office Workers XI 2–1 in the final. Maccabi Tel Aviv organized a cup competition for the Hebrew teams under the name "The Hebrew Cup", which was won by Maccabi Nes Tziona, and an 8-team league competition, which was called Mis'chakei HaBechora (Hebrew: משחקי הבכורה, lit. The Premier Games), and was played during the summer months and completed during the following season. An attempt to organize a similar league in Jerusalem, which was announced in July 1923, was abandoned after several weeks in order to re-organize the league.

== Competitions ==
=== Palestine Cup ===
The competition was organized by the British operated Jerusalem Sports Club. Of the Jewish teams, only Maccabi Tel Aviv participated in the tournament, losing to Palestine General Hospital 1–7. The final was played on 7 April 1923, and was won by the No. 14 Squadron RAF team, who had beaten a Palestine Railways XI from Haifa 2–1.

==== Known results ====
Team 1	Score	Team 2
First Round
Palestine General Hospital	2–2	Maccabi Tel Aviv
First Round (replay)
Maccabi Tel Aviv	4–4	Palestine General Hospital
First Round (2nd replay)
Palestine General Hospital	7–1	Maccabi Tel Aviv
Quarter-finals
No. 14 Squadron	w–l	Palestine General Hospital
Semi-final
No. 14 squadron	2–1	The Palestine Gendarmerie, 3rd Co.
RAF HQ XI	2–5	Palestine Railways XI
Final
No. 14 Squadron	2–2	Palestine Railways XI
Final (replay)
No. 14 Squadron	2–1	Palestine Railways XI

=== The Hebrew Cup ===
The competition was organized by Maccabi Tel Aviv for Hebrew clubs that were not admitted to the Palestine Cup. Nine teams competed in the competition. In order to allow Maccabi Haifa to compete without burdening the newly re-founded club with expenses, the club was given a bye to the final.

==== Results ====
Team 1	Score	Team 2
First Round
Maccabi Nes Tziona	3–0	Maccabi Rishon LeZion
Second Round
Ayala Tel Aviv	1–1; 3–0 (R)	Ofer Tel Aviv
Maccabi Tel Aviv B	5–0	Beranovich Tel Aviv
Maccabi Nes Tziona	3–0	Maccabi Rehovot
Quarter-finals
Maccabi Nes Tziona	3–0	Maccabi Petah Tikva
Ayala Tel Aviv	2–1	Maccabi Tel Aviv B
Semi-final
Maccabi Nes Tziona	2–1	Ayala Tel Aviv
Final
Maccabi Nes Tziona	2–0	Maccabi Haifa

=== Mis'chakei HaBechora ===
Following the successful Hebrew Cup competitions, Maccabi Tel Aviv organized a league competition for clubs from Tel Aviv area. Eight teams competed in the league, which started on 9 June 1923. The competition was completed during the following season.

==== Table (as of 21 July 1923) ====
Pos	Team	Pld	W	D	L	GF	GA	GR	Pts
1	Maccabi Tel Aviv	3	3	0	0	7	1	7.000	6
2	Maccabi Nes Tziona	4	3	0	1	11	8	1.375	6
3	Maccabi Petah Tikva	4	2	1	1	12	3	4.000	5
4	Nordia Rishon LeZion	5	1	3	1	7	5	1.400	5
5	Hakoah Tel Aviv	3	1	1	1	5	3	1.667	3
6	Ayala	2	1	0	1	5	5	1.000	2
7	Ofer	4	0	1	3	1	14	0.071	1
8	Rehovot	3	0	0	3	1	10	0.100	0

Updated to match(es) played on 21 July 1923. Source: Do'ar HaYom

=== The Jerusalem Departments Football League ===
The league entered its second season, with nine teams competing. The team representing the British Gendarmerie won the league.

==== Final Table ====
Pos	Team	Pld	W	D	L	GF	GA	GR	Pts
1	Gendarmerie	16	15	0	1	82	14	5.857	30
2	Government House	16	11	3	2	60	20	3.000	25
3	T.C.A.S.	16	7	3	6	30	21	1.429	17
4	P. & P.	16	7	2	7	43	37	1.162	16
5	Education	16	5	5	6	20	50	0.400	15
6	Medical	16	5	4	7	18	19	0.947	14
7	L.G.I.	16	3	4	9	19	43	0.442	10
8	P. & T.	16	4	1	11	25	56	0.446	9
9	P.W.D.	16	2	4	10	21	58	0.362	8

Updated to match(es) played on 1923. Source: The Jerusalem Football League Handbook 1923–1924

== Football Clubs founded ==
- Maccabi Haifa
- Harari Tel Aviv
