= 1990–91 Israel State Cup =

Tournament details
- Country: Israel

Final positions
- Champions: Maccabi Haifa (2nd title)
- Runners-up: Hapoel Petah Tikva

The 1990–91 Israel State Cup (Hebrew: גביע המדינה, Gvia HaMedina) was the 52nd season of Israel's nationwide football cup competition and the 37th after the Israeli Declaration of Independence.

The competition was won by Maccabi Haifa who have beaten Hapoel Petah Tikva 3–1 in the final.

== Results ==
=== Eighth Round ===
Home team	Score	Away team
Maccabi Haifa	3–0	Maccabi Sha'arayim
Maccabi Petah Tikva	4–0	Hapoel Tzafririm Holon
Maccabi Netanya	2–1	Maccabi Jaffa
Hapoel Yehud	1–2	Hapoel Petah Tikva
Hapoel Jerusalem	1–2	Maccabi HaShikma Ramat Hen
Maccabi Yavne	0–1	Beitar Tel Aviv
Beitar Jerusalem	2–1	Maccabi Isfiya
Maccabi Lazarus Holon	0–1 (a.e.t.)	Bnei Yehuda
Hapoel Be'er Sheva	3–0	Maccabi Acre
Shimshon Tel Aviv	5–3 (a.e.t.)	Hapoel Kfar Saba
Hapoel Tel Aviv	0–1	Hapoel Ramat Gan
Maccabi Tel Aviv	3–0	Hapoel Ashdod

Byes: Hapoel Kiryat Ono, Hapoel Tiberias, Bnei Hatzor, Maccabi Ironi Ashdod.

=== Round of 16 ===
Team 1	Agg.	Team 2	1st leg	2nd leg
Hapoel Tiberias	1–5	Hapoel Kiryat Ono	0–2	1–3
Hapoel Be'er Sheva	3–4	Maccabi Petah Tikva	1–2	2–2
Maccabi Netanya	4–3	Maccabi Tel Aviv	3–1	1–2
Shimshon Tel Aviv	4–3	Hapoel Ramat Gan	4–3	0–0
Hapoel Petah Tikva	4–2	Maccabi HaShikma Ramat Hen	4–1	0–1
Maccabi Ironi Ashdod	2–4	Maccabi Haifa	2–2	0–2
Bnei Hatzor	1–12	Bnei Yehuda	0–4	1–8
Beitar Jerusalem	1–4	Beitar Tel Aviv	1–2	0–2

=== Quarter-finals ===
Team 1	Agg.	Team 2	1st leg	2nd leg
Beitar Tel Aviv	2–3	Hapoel Kiryat Ono	2–2	0–1
Maccabi Haifa	2–0	Maccabi Netanya	1–0	1–0
Maccabi Petah Tikva	1–3	Shimshon Tel Aviv	1–2	0–1
Bnei Yehuda	1–5	Hapoel Petah Tikva	1–1	0–4

=== Semi-finals ===
Home team	Score	Away team
Maccabi Haifa	2–0	Shimshon Tel Aviv
Hapoel Petah Tikva	4–2	Hapoel Kiryat Ono

=== Final ===
4 June 1991

Maccabi Haifa	3–1	Hapoel Petah Tikva
Atar 51'; Eisenberg 66'; Berkovic 85'		Bason 36'

Ramat Gan Stadium
Attendance: 25000
Referee: Ben Itzhak
