= 2003–04 Israel State Cup =

Tournament details
- Country: Israel

Final positions
- Champions: Bnei Sakhnin
- Runners-up: Hapoel Haifa

The 2003–04 Israel State Cup (Hebrew: גביע המדינה, Gvia HaMedina) was the 65th season of Israel's nationwide football cup competition and the 50th after the Israeli Declaration of Independence.

The competition was won by Bnei Sakhnin who had beaten Hapoel Haifa 4–1 in the final. This is the first time the cup was won by a club from an Israeli Arab town.

By winning, Bnei Sakhnin qualified to the 2004–05 UEFA Cup, entering in the second qualifying round.

== Results ==
=== Eighth Round ===
Home team	Score	Away team
Hapoel Haifa	2–1 (a.e.t.)	Maccabi Petah Tikva
Beitar Kiryat Gat	0–5	Hapoel Tel Aviv
Maccabi Ahi Nazareth	3–0	Maccabi Ben Zvi
Hapoel Ramat Gan	1–2	Ironi Rishon LeZion
Hapoel Ra'anana	1–2	Ironi Kiryat Shmona
Maccabi Ramat Amidar	0–3	Hapoel Nazareth Illit
Hapoel Tira	2–3 (a.e.t.)	Hapoel Acre
Hapoel Herzliya	0–2	Bnei Sakhnin
Hapoel Jerusalem	2–0	Maccabi Kiryat Gat
Hapoel Petah Tikva	0–2	Maccabi Netanya
Maccabi Haifa	5–0	Hakoah Maccabi Ramat Gan
Maccabi Tel Aviv	2–1	Maccabi HaShikma Ramat Hen
Maccabi Herzliya	1–4	Hapoel Be'er Sheva
Bnei Yehuda	2–1	Hapoel Tzafririm Holon
Beitar Jerusalem	3–1	Ironi Kiryat Ata
Hapoel Kfar Saba	0–1	F.C. Ashdod

=== Round of 16 ===
Home team	Score	Away team
Hapoel Jerusalem	0–1	Maccabi Haifa
Beitar Jerusalem	1–2	Hapoel Haifa
Hapoel Be'er Sheva	0–1	Hapoel Tel Aviv
Bnei Yehuda	1–2 (a.e.t.)	Maccabi Netanya
Maccabi Ahi Nazareth	3–2 (a.e.t.)	Hapoel Acre
Ironi Kiryat Shmona	0–4	Maccabi Tel Aviv
Hapoel Nazareth Illit	1–1 (a.e.t.) (4–5 p.)	Bnei Sakhnin
F.C. Ashdod	2–1	Ironi Rishon LeZion

=== Quarter-finals ===
Home team	Score	Away team
Bnei Sakhnin	1–1 (a.e.t.) (4–3 p.)	Maccabi Tel Aviv
Maccabi Ahi Nazareth	1–2	F.C. Ashdod
Hapoel Tel Aviv	2–2 (a.e.t.) (4–2 p.)	Maccabi Haifa
Maccabi Netanya	1–2	Hapoel Haifa

=== Semi-finals ===
Home team	Score	Away team
Bnei Sakhnin	1–0	F.C. Ashdod
Hapoel Haifa	3–1 (a.e.t.)	Hapoel Tel Aviv

=== Final ===
18 May 2004

Hapoel Haifa	1–4	Bnei Sakhnin
Dahan 45'		Danan 61'; Asulin 65', 88' (pen.); Lima 75'

Ramat Gan Stadium
Attendance: 35000
Referee: Koren
