= Palestine Regiment =

Infantry regiment of the British Army during the Second World War

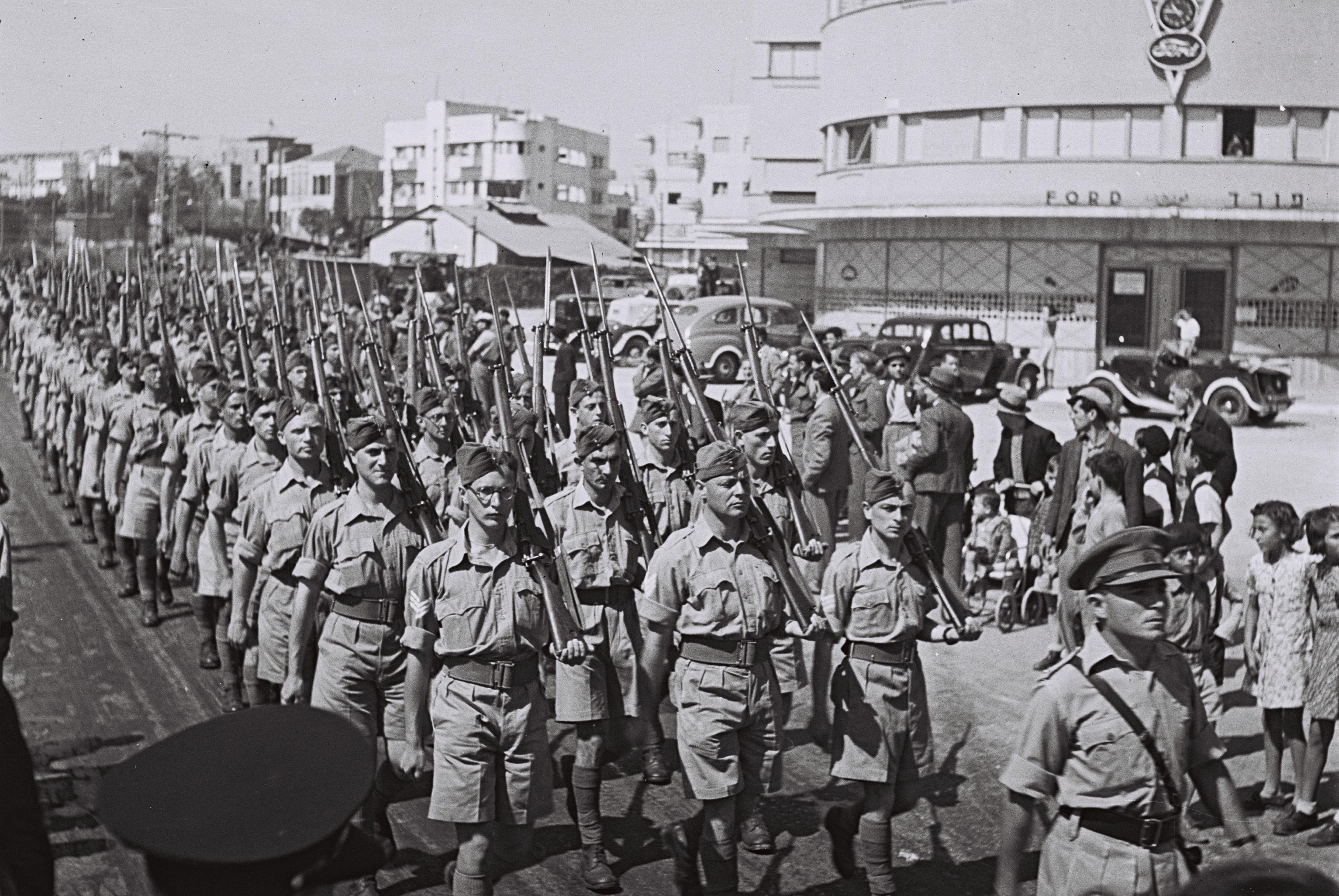
- Members of the Palestine Regiment marching along Petah Tikva Road, Tel Aviv, on "Jewish Soldiers Day", 27 September 1942
- Active: 1942–1944
- Country: United Kingdom
- Branch: British Army
- Type: Infantry
- Size: 3,800 volunteers

The Palestine Regiment was an infantry regiment of the British Army that was formed in 1942. During the Second World War, the regiment was deployed to Egypt and Cyrenaica, but most of their work consisted of guard duty. Until its reformation in 1944, the Palestine Regiment consisted of Jews and Palestinian Arabs, recruited from Mandatory Palestine. From 1944, the Jewish military subunits of Palestine Regiment became the basis to form the larger Jewish Brigade, which took part in combat operations in Italy in 1945.

== Background ==
In 1940, Jews and Arabs living under the British Mandate for Palestine were allowed to form separate companies, known as Palestine Infantry Companies, as part of the Royal East Kent Regiment, known as the "Buffs". The establishment of the first Jewish Infantry Company was completed in September 1940, within the framework of the "Buffs" and 14 more Jewish Companies were raised, in which about 5,300 men served. Their mission included security, guarding installations and escorting convoys in Palestine. Their training exercises were extremely limited and they were equipped with First World War-era surplus. The declared intent of the British to recruit an equal number of Jews and Arabs did not occur.

In the fall of 1939, the British War Cabinet decided to form a new regiment called the Palestine Regiment. The British garrison in Palestine consisted at the time of no fewer than eleven infantry battalions and two cavalry regiments. While in the early phase of the Second World War, the British had sufficient manpower to meet this demand, as the war progressed, they began to experience a manpower shortage, as well as shortages of weapons, artillery and supplies. These circumstances mandated the British government to use new reserves for duties that required limited training or logistic support. Under Sir Charles Tegart police training projects had been initiated after the 1936 Arab revolt, and these were nearly complete by 1939. British recruiters in Palestine had enjoyed at least moderate success in forming the units of the Auxiliary Military Pioneer Corps (AMPC), which they hoped would be expanded once the equipment and supplies became available. In response, the War Cabinet ordered a study of the Palestine manpower situation. Almost simultaneously, Chaim Weizmann offered to help recruit an entire Jewish division for the services in the British Army.

== Formation and service ==
The Palestine Regiment was formed in 1942 with the Palestine Infantry Companies that were attached to the Buffs forming the bulk of the new formation. The regiment was divided into separate Jewish and Arab battalions. According to historian Ashley Jackson the regiment initially consisted of 1,600 Jews and 1,200 Arabs and by 1942 the ranks filled to 10,000 Jews and 4,000 Arabs in the British armed forces, further according to writer Howard Blum, Jews outnumbered Arabs by a more than three to one ratio.

The Jewish companies were then formed into three battalions, which became the new Palestine Regiment. Personnel of the Palestine Regiment later formed the core of the Jewish Brigade.
