= Hapoel Tayibe F.C. =

Hapoel Tayibe
- Full name: Hapoel Tayibe Football Club
- Founded: 1961
- Dissolved: 2003
- Ground: Municipal Stadium, Tayibe
- 2002–03: Liga Alef North, 14th (Relegated)
Home colours	Away colours

Hapoel Tayibe F.C. (Hebrew: הפועל טייבה) was an Israeli football club based in Tayibe. In 1996 they became the first ever Israeli Arab club to play in the top division. However, they were relegated at the end of their first season in the top flight, and folded in 2003 after three more relegations.

== History ==
The club was founded in 1961, and joined Liga Gimel. In 1974 the club was promoted to Liga Bet, and in 1986 to Liga Alef, the third tier at the time.

In 1993 Hapoel were promoted to Liga Artzit. In their first season in the second tier the club finished fifth, missing out on the promotion play-off spot by five points. Two seasons later, under Polish manager Wojciech Łazarek, Tayibe won the Liga Artzit title, finishing 15 points clear of third-placed Hapoel Bat Yam, and were promoted to Liga Leumit, the top division, becoming the first Israeli Arab club to play at the top level in Israel.

Due to the poor state of the club's 2,500-seat stadium (at the time of their promotion it was accessible by two dirt tracks), the club played its home matches at the Sar-Tov Stadium in Netanya, Kiryat Eliezer in Haifa and the Shalom Stadium in Umm al-Fahm. Although the club started well, and was in tenth place after six matches (with three wins), they won only one more match all season. Lazarek was replaced by Zvi Rosen in January, and then Rifaat Turk, but despite the changes in management Tayibe finished bottom of the table, resulting in relegation back to Liga Artzit. During the season, on 4 April 1997, Tayibe player Waheeb Jabarra died during a match against Bnei Yehuda.

Back in the second tier, Tayibe finished eighth in the 1997–98 season, in which their match against fellow Arab club Bnei Sakhnin had to be abandoned due to fans rioting. The following season the club finished bottom of Liga Artzit with only six points from 30 matches and were relegated. Despite a points deduction for violating budget rules, they finished mid-table in the 1999–2000 season. Two seasons later the deduction of one point caused Tayibe to be relegated, as they finished a point below Hapoel Majd al-Krum, but with a better goal difference. In their first season back at the fourth level, the club finished bottom of the north division of Liga Alef, and were relegated again. Following its relegation to the fifth level, the club collapsed. In the same season Bnei Sakhnin and another Arab club, Maccabi Ahi Nazareth, were both promoted to the top division.

== Notable former players ==
- Akaki Devadze, Georgian international goalkeeper

== Honours ==
=== League ===
Honour	No.	Years
Second Tier	1	1995–96
Fourth tier	1	1985–86
