= Maccabi Jerusalem F.C. =

Maccabi Jerusalem
- Full name: Maccabi Jerusalem Football Club מועדון כדורגל מכבי ירושלים
- Founded: 1911; 114 years ago 1970 (Refouned)
- Dissolved: 1963; 2005; 20 years ago
- Owner: Laurent Levy
- Manager: Assaf Baruchian
- League: Liga Alef South
- 2023–24: Liga Alef South B, 1th of 16 (champions)
Home colours	Away colours

Maccabi Jerusalem Football Club (Hebrew: מועדון כדורגל מכבי ירושלים) was an Israeli football club based at Jerusalem. The club was disbanded in 1963, reformed in 1970, and was withdrawn again in 2005.

== History ==
The club was founded in 1911, the second football club to be formed in Israel. At first, all of the team's matches were friendly matches against local teams, foreign-based visiting teams or visiting army units' teams. After the establishment of the British Mandate of Palestine, the club joined local cup and league competitions, such as the Jerusalem Cup and the Municipal Jerusalem Cup.

The club was disbanded briefly during 1924 or 1925, and was reformed when two local clubs, HaGibor and HaZvi merged to form a team called Hasmonean Jerusalem, and later took the name Maccabi Hasmonean Jerusalem.

During the 1920s the club participated in several nationwide competitions, including the Maccabi club competition of Magen Shimshon, in which the club finished as runners-up in 1926 and 1927 and the unofficial, pre-EIFA Palestine Cup. In 1928 the club took part in the first EIFA Palestine Cup, and made its way to the final, where it lost 0–2 to Hapoel Allenby Tel Aviv. However, the club appealed to the F.A., claiming that a Hapoel player, Moshe Meir wasn't registered. The appeal was accepted and the teams shared the cup.

The club advanced to the final of the next Palestine Cup competition, but lost 0–4 to Maccabi Tel Aviv. The club was also listed as the winner of the EIFA league in 1928. However, as no such league was held, this entry seems to be erroneous.

During the early 1930s, the club competed in the Palestine Cup and in the Palestine League, finishing fourth in 1931–32 and runners-up in 1933–34. The club had to pull out of the league as travelling conditions in Palestine got worse during the 1936–39 Arab revolt. In 1937, the club changed its name to Maccabi Bar Kokhva Jerusalem and won the 1940 Jerusalem Municipal league and finished runners-up in the 1941–42 Jerusalem League.

After the establishment of the state of Israel, the club, now reverting to the name Maccabi Jerusalem competed in the 1949-50 Liga Meuhedet, and was placed the following season in Liga Bet, then the second tier, which, after the creation of Liga Leumit before the 1954–55 season, and by the end of that season the team was relegated to Liga Bet, the third tier, followed by another immediate relegation, to Liga Gimel. During this time the team also played in the Israel State Cup, its best performance was in 1954–55, when the team made it to the last sixteen.

The club was disbanded at the end of the 1962–63 season, but was reformed at the beginning of the 1970–71 season and played in Liga Dalet, then the fifth and lowest tier of Israeli football. The club reached Liga Bet in 1973–74, where it played until the end of the 1975–76 season, when the club was docked six points for not showing up for their match against Hapoel Gedera and relegated to Liga Gimel. By the mid-1990s, the reformed club merged with Maccabi Ma'ale Adumim and became known as Maccabi Jerusalem/Ma'ale Adumim. They started a period of success, after they were promoted to Liga Bet and at the end of the 1999–2000 season, finished runners-up in Liga Bet South B division and were promoted to Liga Alef (then the fourth tier) as the best Liga Bet South runners-up, following the withdrawals of Maccabi Lazarus Holon and Maccabi Jaffa from Liga Alef at the end of that season. The merged club played two seasons in Liga Alef South until they finished bottom in the 2001–02 season and relegated back to Liga Bet. Maccabi Jerusalem/Ma'ale Adumim folded at the end of the 2004–05 season while playing in Liga Bet and the club players were released at 2 June 2005.

== Honours ==
- Palestine League
  - Runners-up 1933–34
- Palestine Cup
  - Joint-Winners 1928 Palestine Cup
  - Runners-up 1929 Palestine Cup
