= Israel State Cup =

- Organiser(s): Israel Football Association (IFA)
- Founded: 1928; 98 years ago
- Region: Israel
- Qualifier for: UEFA Europa League
- Domestic cup: Israel Super Cup
- Current champions: Maccabi Tel Aviv (25th title)
- Most championships: Maccabi Tel Aviv (25 titles)
- Website: football.org.il/NationalCup
- 2026–27 Israel State Cup

The Israel State Cup (Hebrew: גביע המדינה, Gvia HaMedina), is a knockout cup competition in Israeli football, run by the Israel Football Association (IFA).

The State Cup was first held in 1928 named the Palestine Cup. It was also informally named the People's Cup because like with many nations, for example England's FA Cup, it involves clubs of all standards playing against each other, there is the possibility for "minnows" from the lower divisions to become "giant-killers" by eliminating top clubs from the tournament, although lower division teams rarely reach the final.

The last below the top-flight club to make the final was Maccabi Netanya in 2014, they have since been promoted to the Israeli Premier League.

Maccabi Tel Aviv are the current Israel State Cup holders, having beaten Hapoel Be'er Sheva 2–1 in the final for their twenty-fifth title.

Maccabi Tel Aviv have 25 titles, holding the record for most titles won. Hapoel Tel Aviv in 1937–1939 and 2010–2012 are the only club to have retained the State Cup for three consecutive seasons.

== Format ==
The competition is a knockout tournament which includes all of the Israeli league clubs with pairings for each round drawn at random – there are no seeds, and the draw for each round is not made until after the scheduled dates for the previous round. The draw also determines which teams will play at home.

Each tie is played as a single leg. If a match is drawn, the game is settled with extra time and penalty shootouts, though until 1964 replays would be played until one team was victorious. Some ties took as many as three matches to settle.

There are a total of 13 rounds in the competition—nine rounds, followed by quarter-finals, semi-finals, and the final. The competition begins in September with the preliminary rounds which are contested by the lowest-ranked clubs. Liga Bet and Liga Gimel clubs compete in their own division for the divisional cup, with the two finalists in each Liga Bet division (8 teams) and the winner of each Liga Gimel division (8 teams) qualify to the sixth round. Clubs playing in the Liga Alef play in the Fifth Round, from which 16 clubs (8 from each Liga Alef division) qualify to the sixth round. Liga Leumit teams are given exemption to the Seventh Round. The 18 teams (14 winners and 4 byes) from that round join the 14 clubs from the Israeli Premier League, at which point there are 32 teams remaining in the competition.

As well as being presented with the trophy, the winning team also qualifies for the UEFA Europa League. If the winners have already qualified for the UEFA Champions League via the Israeli Premier League, the UEFA Europa League place goes to the State Cup runners-up. If they also have qualified for the UEFA Champions League, the place goes to the next highest placed finisher in the league table.

=== The draw ===
The draw for each round, performed by drawing the clubs name from a jar, is a source of great interest to clubs and their supporters, and is broadcast live on the internet. Sometimes two top clubs may be drawn against each other in the early rounds, removing the possibility of them meeting in the final. Lower-ranked clubs with reputations as 'giant-killers' look forward to meeting a top team at home, although in some cases the expense of providing policing for a game can outweigh any financial windfall from larger crowds. Mid-ranked teams hope for a draw against a peer to improve their chances of reaching future rounds. Top-ranked teams look for easy opposition, but have to be on their guard against 'giant-killers' and lower teams with ambition. The balls are being drawn by the officials of the Israel Football Association.

== Semifinal and final ==
The semifinals and the finals were traditionally held in the Ramat Gan Stadium in the middle of the week (Tuesday or Wednesday). The semifinals take place on the same day, with the stadium split to four sections for each supporter set, and a single ticket valid for both matches – the fans can enter the stadium whenever they want to, and stay for the second game if they wish. This practice is known in Israel as hatzaga kfula (lit. double show), and was common in Israeli football in the past. During the last few years, both the semi-finals and the final have been played in other, newer stadiums, such as Teddy, Sammy Ofer and Netanya.

For the final, the two winning teams of the semifinal play a single final game, with the winning team being awarded the State Cup from the President of Israel. The president's role is traditional, and entered the Israeli sports lexicon, with meeting the president being an expression equal to saying winning the cup.

== Notable events in the State Cup ==
Year	Event
1928	Foundation of the Palestine Cup.
1928	Hapoel Tel Aviv and Maccabi Hasmonean Jerusalem were the first teams to win the cup and the only teams who shared the cup.
1930	First final where a Non-Palestine team reaches the final, having the 48th Battalion of the British Army club losing to Maccabi Tel Aviv 4–0.
1932	First final where a Non-Palestine team wins the cup, having the British Police club beating Hapoel Haifa 3–0.
1948	Renaming of the cup to the Israeli State Cup.
1952	Maccabi Petah Tikva became the first club to win the State Cup after Israel declaration of independence, beating Maccabi Tel Aviv 1–0.
1958	Exhibition games for the decade of independence, two finals for each of the top two divisions: Hapoel Haifa 2–0 Hapoel Jerusalem (Liga Leumit); Hapoel Tiberias 7–1 Hapoel Be'er Sheva (Liga Alef).
1973	Exhibition games for the 25th anniversary of independence, two finals for each of the top two divisions: Maccabi Petah Tikva 1–1 (4–2 pen.) Maccabi Haifa (Liga Leumit); Hapoel Yehud 2–0 Hapoel Ramat Gan (Liga Alef).
2003	Hapoel Ramat Gan became the first club outside the top division to win the State Cup, beating top flight Hapoel Be'er Sheva 5–4 on penalties after a 1–1 draw.
2004	Bnei Sakhnin became the first Arab club to win the cup and the first club from the Northern District to win an Israeli cup after beating Hapoel Haifa .
2024	Maccabi Petah Tikva won its second State Cup after Israel declaration of independence (third overall) beating Hapoel Be'er Sheva 1–0, and finished 72-year drought (record) since the previous State Cup win in 1952.
