= Tel Aviv derby =

Club football rivalry match

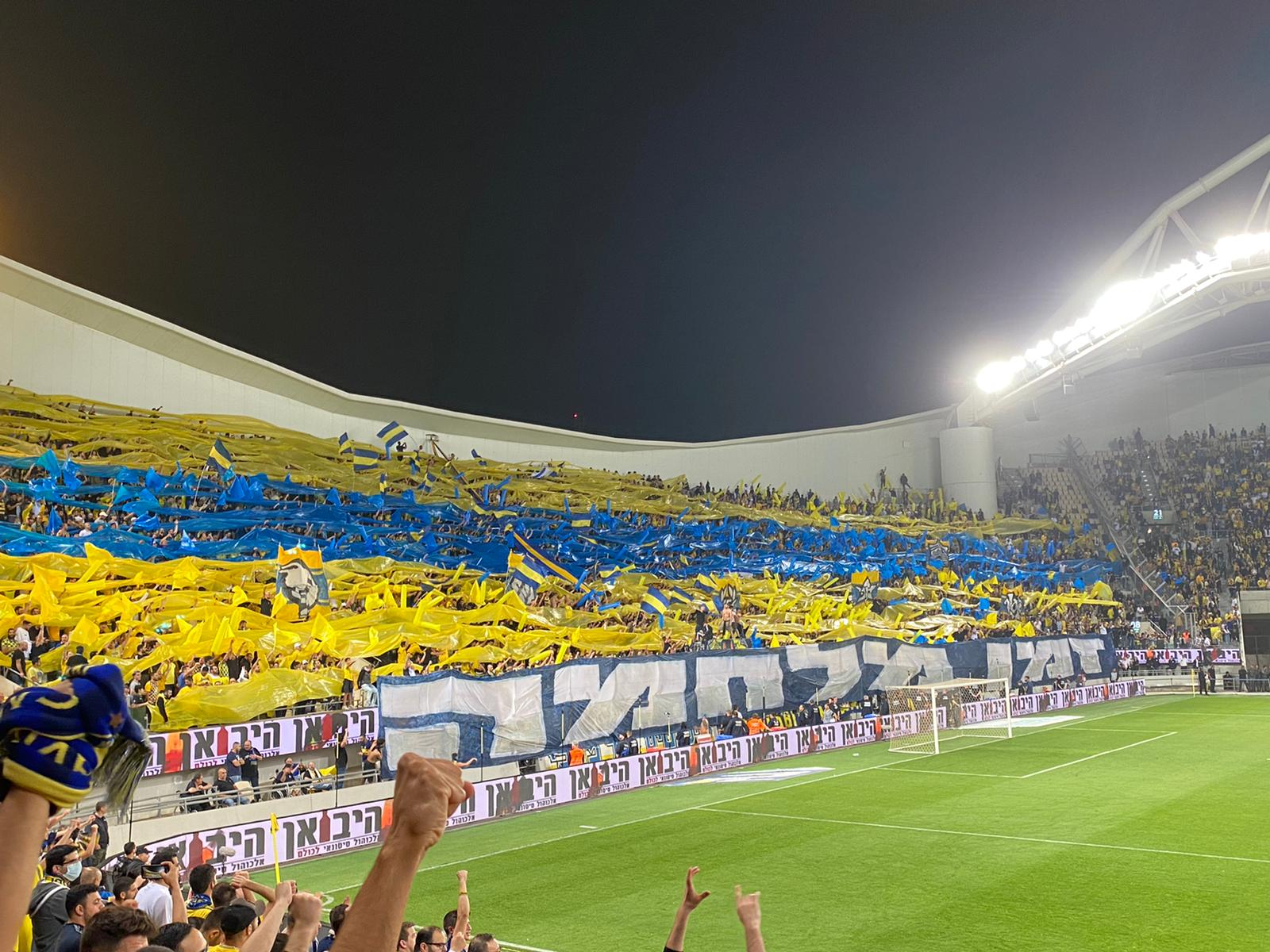
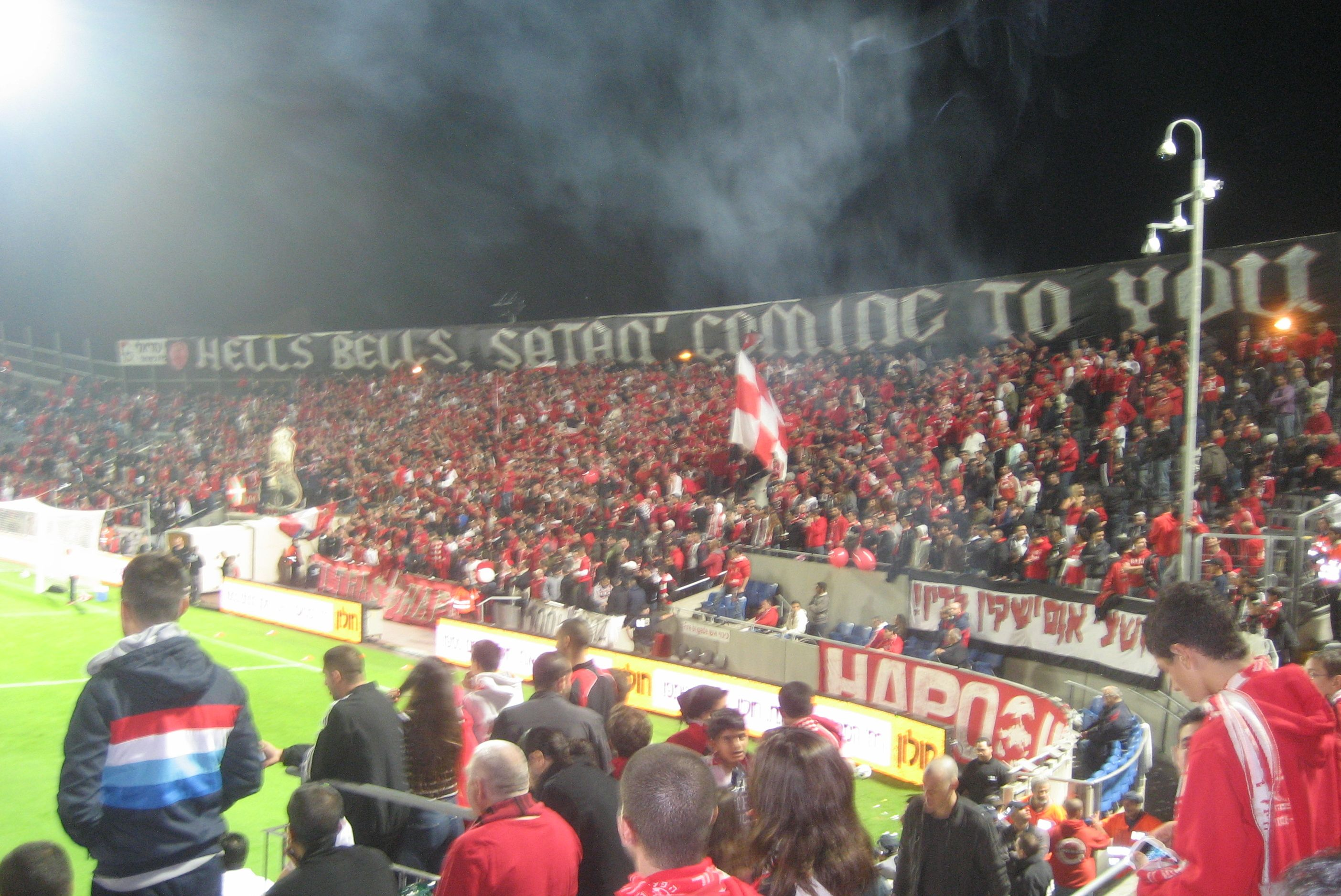
- Maccabi Tel Aviv Hapoel Tel Aviv
- Location: Tel Aviv, Israel
- Teams: Maccabi Tel Aviv; Hapoel Tel Aviv
- First meeting: 25 February 1928 (Friendly); 19 December 1931 (League)
- Latest meeting: 26 January 2026 (2025–26 Israeli Premier League); Maccabi 1–2 Hapoel
- Next meeting: 24 January 2026 (2025–26 Israeli Premier League)
- Stadiums: Bloomfield Stadium, Tel Aviv

Statistics
- Total meetings: 168
- Most wins: Maccabi Tel Aviv
- All-time series (Israeli Premier League only): Maccabi: 62; Drawn: 59; Hapoel: 47
- Largest victory: Maccabi 5–0 Hapoel (1969–70 Liga Leumit, 2016–17 Israeli Premier League, 2021–22 Israeli Premier League and 2023–24 Israeli Premier League)

The Tel Aviv derby (Hebrew: הדרבי של תל אביב) refers to football matches between Israeli clubs Maccabi Tel Aviv and Hapoel Tel Aviv.

The rivalry between the clubs also exists in basketball, although Maccabi have been the dominant club in Israeli basketball since the 1960s.

== History ==
Maccabi Tel Aviv was established in 1906, while Hapoel Tel Aviv was founded in 1923. Although initially reluctant to play each other, in early 1928 the clubs came to an operating agreement, and the first friendly encounter between the teams took place on 25 February 1928 on Maccabi ground, with Maccabi winning 3–0, With a rematch played a week later on Hapoel ground, this time Maccabi winning 2–1.

Between them, the clubs had together won 36 championships and 40 national cups. Both clubs have played in the top division of Israeli football both before and since independence in 1948, with the exception of the 1989–90 season, when Hapoel played in the second tier following relegation the previous season and with the exception of the 2017–18 season, when Hapoel played in the second tier following relegation the previous season. The first league encounter between the teams was played on 19 December 1931, and the points were shared with a result of 1–1. Prior to independence, the clubs have met 17 times in the league, out of which Hapoel won 9, Maccabi won 5 and 3 resulted in a draw. Post 1948, Maccabi holds the lead with 62 league victories, opposite 46 Hapoel wins and 59 draws. Overall, since 1931, Hapoel has 55 league victories, Maccabi has 67 and 62 matches ended with a draw.

The two clubs met 8 times at the Israeli State Cup final, most recently at the 2020–21 Israel State Cup Final. The clubs also met in several other competitive tournaments, such as the Toto Cup and the Israel Super Cup.

The rivalry between the traditional background of the Hapoel and Maccabi sports associations led to the development of the rivalry between the clubs. The two clubs have different support bases; Hapoel are linked to the working-class, whilst Maccabi are considered a more middle class club. However nowadays this is mostly no longer the case with both clubs having a massive nationwide fanbase.

A 3 November 2014 match was cancelled after numerous fans ran onto the pitch and began fighting with players and other fans. Hapoel's manager called it a "black day" for Israeli football. A 19 October 2025 match was also cancelled due to violence that left five fans and three police officers injured.

== Bloomfield Stadium ==
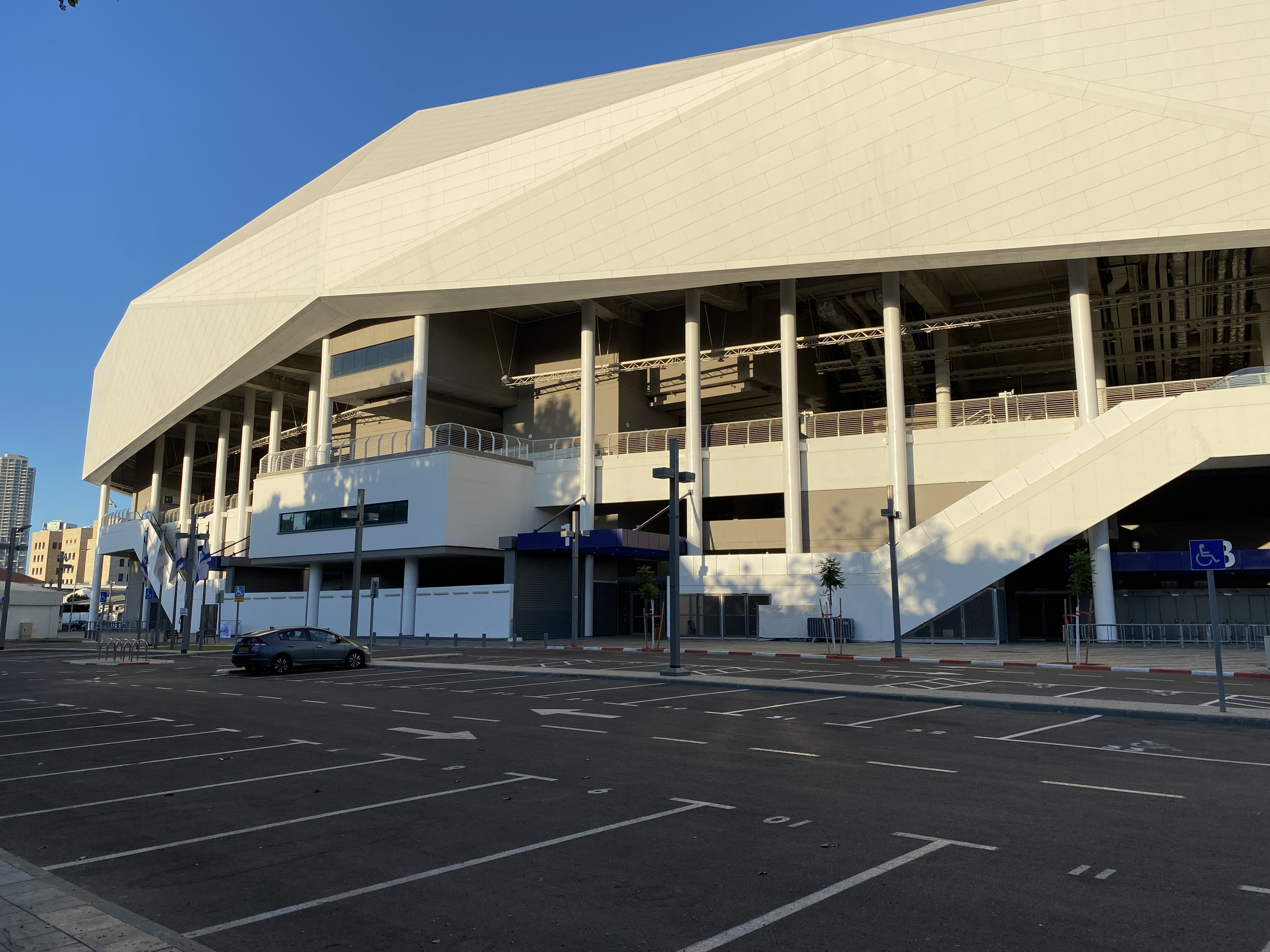
Bloomfield Stadium of Tel Aviv

Both clubs currently play at the Bloomfield Stadium. When Hapoel Tel Aviv are the home team in the derby gates 10–11, are reserved for fans of Maccabi. When Maccabi Tel Aviv are the home team, gates 4–5 are reserved for fans of Hapoel.

== Tel Aviv mini-derby ==
Other matches between top-tier teams from Tel Aviv, currently Bnei Yehuda Tel Aviv, and in the past also Beitar Tel Aviv, Shimson Tel Aviv and Maccabi Jaffa, and between those other teams and either Maccabi or Hapoel are usually referred to as the Tel Aviv mini-derby or the Little Tel Aviv Derby.

== List of results ==
=== Israel State Cup ===
#	Date	Season		Stadium	Home team	Away team	Score	Goals home	Goals away
1	10 June 1933	1933	Final	Maccabi Petah Tikva Ground	Hapoel Tel Aviv	Maccabi Tel Aviv	0–1		
2	2 June 1934	1934	Final	Maccabi Petah Tikva Ground	Hapoel Tel Aviv	Maccabi Tel Aviv	3–2		
3	28 May 1938	1938	Final	Maccabiah Stadium	Hapoel Tel Aviv	Maccabi Tel Aviv	2–1		
4	20 April 1940	1940	Semi-final	Maccabiah Stadium	Maccabi Tel Aviv	Hapoel Tel Aviv	4–0		
5	15 November 1941	1941	Final	Maccabiah Stadium	Maccabi Tel Aviv	Hapoel Tel Aviv	2–1		
6	29 May 1954	1953–1954	Quarter-final	Basa Stadium	Hapoel Tel Aviv	Maccabi Tel Aviv	0–1		Yosef Merimovich (68)
7	28 June 1958	1957–1958	Round of 16	Basa Stadium	Hapoel Tel Aviv	Maccabi Tel Aviv	0–1		Yosef Goldstein (16)
8	19 September 1964	1963–1964	Round of 16	Bloomfield Stadium	Hapoel Tel Aviv	Maccabi Tel Aviv	0–4		Shabi Ben Baruch (o.g. 38), Giora Spiegel (55), Rachamim Talbi (75), Ori Kadmi (82)
9	1 November 1967	1966–1967	Final	Bloomfield Stadium	Maccabi Tel Aviv	Hapoel Tel Aviv	2–1	George Borba (62)	Ori Kadmi (28), Rachamim Talbi (66)
10	1 June 1983	1982–1983	Final	Ramat Gan Stadium	Hapoel Tel Aviv	Maccabi Tel Aviv	3–2	Ya'akov Ekhoiz (25), Moshe Sinai (34), Gili Landau (64)	Moshe Schweitzer (40), Yossi Zana (o.g. 60)
11	17 March 1987	1986–1987	Round of 16	Bloomfield Stadium	Hapoel Tel Aviv	Maccabi Tel Aviv	1–2	Moshe Sinai (53)	Yossi Zana (o.g. 18), David Azulai (58)
12	7 June 1988	1987–1988	Final	Ramat Gan Stadium	Maccabi Tel Aviv	Hapoel Tel Aviv	2–1	Miki Cohen (39), Benny Tabak (49)	Miki Ben Shitrit (25)
13	18 April 1992	1991–1992	Quarter-final	Bloomfield Stadium	Hapoel Tel Aviv	Maccabi Tel Aviv	0–3		Ya'akov Ekhoiz (o.g. 50), Meir Melika (66), Amir Turgeman (88)
14	22 April 1992	1991–1992	Quarter-final	Ramat Gan Stadium	Maccabi Tel Aviv	Hapoel Tel Aviv	3–1	Avi Nimni (42), Arik Shriki (53), Hisham Zuabi (80)	Haim Bahar (50)
15	7 June 1994	1993–1994	Final	Ramat Gan Stadium	Maccabi Tel Aviv	Hapoel Tel Aviv	2–0	Itzik Zohar (49), Nir Klinger (71)	
16	15 April 1997	1996–1997	Quarter-final	Ramat Gan Stadium	Maccabi Tel Aviv	Hapoel Tel Aviv	3–0	Offer Mizrahi (35, 44), Avi Nimni (70)	
17	7 March 2000	1999–2000	Round of 16	Bloomfield Stadium	Hapoel Tel Aviv	Maccabi Tel Aviv	2–0	Ilan Bakhar (39), Omri Afek (53)	
18	9 May 2001	2000–2001	Semi-final	Ramat Gan Stadium	Maccabi Tel Aviv	Hapoel Tel Aviv	2–0	Baruch Dego (19, 23)	
19	16 February 2009	2008–2009	Ninth Round	Bloomfield Stadium	Hapoel Tel Aviv	Maccabi Tel Aviv	2–0	Mahran Lala (31), Samuel Yeboah (90)	
20	2 June 2021	2020–2021	Final	Bloomfield Stadium	Maccabi Tel Aviv	Hapoel Tel Aviv	2–1	Yonatan Cohen (73), Luis Hernández (96)	Omri Altman (31)
21	14 January 2026	2025–2026	Round of 16	Bloomfield Stadium	Hapoel Tel Aviv	Maccabi Tel Aviv	1–1		
22		2026–2027	Eighth round	Bloomfield Stadium	Hapoel Tel Aviv	Maccabi Tel Aviv			

=== Toto Cup ===
#	Date	Season		Stadium	Home team	Away team	Score	Goals home	Goals away
1	15 September 1990	1990–1991	Group stage	Bloomfield Stadium	Hapoel Tel Aviv	Maccabi Tel Aviv	1–1		
2	29 December 1990	1990–1991	Group stage	Ramat Gan Stadium	Maccabi Tel Aviv	Hapoel Tel Aviv	0–1		
3	21 January 1991	1991–1992	Semi-final	Bloomfield Stadium	Maccabi Tel Aviv	Hapoel Tel Aviv	1–0	Arik Shriki (23)	
4	28 November 1992	1992–1993	Group stage	Bloomfield Stadium	Hapoel Tel Aviv	Maccabi Tel Aviv	0–3		
5	13 February 1993	1992–1993	Group stage	Ramat Gan Stadium	Maccabi Tel Aviv	Hapoel Tel Aviv	1–1		
6	17 August 1996	1996–1997	Group stage	Bloomfield Stadium	Hapoel Tel Aviv	Maccabi Tel Aviv	0–3		
7	12 November 1996	1996–1997	Group stage	Ramat Gan Stadium	Maccabi Tel Aviv	Hapoel Tel Aviv	1–3		
8	23 September 1998	1998–1999	Group stage	Bloomfield Stadium	Hapoel Tel Aviv	Maccabi Tel Aviv	1–2		
9	16 January 1999	1998–1999	Group stage	Ramat Gan Stadium	Maccabi Tel Aviv	Hapoel Tel Aviv	2–0		
10	20 August 2005	2005–2006	Group stage	Bloomfield Stadium	Maccabi Tel Aviv	Hapoel Tel Aviv	0–3		
11	10 January 2006	2005–2006	Group stage	Bloomfield Stadium	Hapoel Tel Aviv	Maccabi Tel Aviv	3–0		
12	28 January 2009	2008–2009	Semi-final	Ramat Gan Stadium	Maccabi Tel Aviv	Hapoel Tel Aviv	1–0	Emmanuel Mayuka (14)	
13	14 August 2010	2010–2011	Group stage	Bloomfield Stadium	Maccabi Tel Aviv	Hapoel Tel Aviv	2–3		
14	10 November 2010	2010–2011	Group stage	Bloomfield Stadium	Hapoel Tel Aviv	Maccabi Tel Aviv	0–3		
15	31 July 2011	2011–2012	Group stage	Bloomfield Stadium	Hapoel Tel Aviv	Maccabi Tel Aviv	2–2		
16	5 August 2012	2012–2013	Group stage	Ramat Gan Stadium	Hapoel Tel Aviv	Maccabi Tel Aviv	0–1		
17	31 August 2014	2014–2015	Group stage	Bloomfield Stadium	Hapoel Tel Aviv	Maccabi Tel Aviv	0–1		
18	1 August 2015	2015–2016	Group stage	Bloomfield Stadium	Hapoel Tel Aviv	Maccabi Tel Aviv	1–3		
19	15 August 2016	2016–2017	Group stage	HaMoshava Stadium	Hapoel Tel Aviv	Maccabi Tel Aviv	0–2		
20	19 August 2018	2018–2019	Semi-final	Netanya Stadium	Maccabi Tel Aviv	Hapoel Tel Aviv	4–1	Yonatan Cohen (36, 66), Shahar Piven (59), Chikeluba Ofoedu (82)	Ahmed Abed (25)
21	29 October 2026	2026–2027	Final	Bloomfield Stadium	Maccabi Tel Aviv	Hapoel Tel Aviv	2–3	Dor Peretz (89, 90+1)	Roei Alkukin (18), Omri Altman (75), Daniel Dappa (83)

=== Other competitions ===
#	Date	Season		Stadium	Home team	Away team	Score	Goals home	Goals away
1	18 December 1954	1954–55 Shapira Cup	Group stage	Basa Stadium	Hapoel Tel Aviv	Maccabi Tel Aviv	2–1	Rosenbaum (15), Fuchs (46)	Reznik (90)
2	15 January 1955	1954–55 Shapira Cup	Group stage	Basa Stadium	Maccabi Tel Aviv	Hapoel Tel Aviv	2–1	Reznik (10), Schweitzer (15, o.g.)	Rosenbaum (81)
3	20 October 1970	1970 Israel Super Cup	Final	Bloomfield Stadium	Maccabi Tel Aviv	Hapoel Tel Aviv	1–2	Meir Nimni (58)	David Salim (26), Yehezkel Chazom (47)
4	2 September 1986	1986 Lilian Cup	Semi-final	Ramat Gan Stadium	Hapoel Tel Aviv	Maccabi Tel Aviv	1–3	Yehuda Amar (89)	Haim Goldberg (3), Benny Tabak (38), Alon Natan (40)
5	5 September 1988	1988 Israel Super Cup	Final	Bloomfield Stadium	Hapoel Tel Aviv	Maccabi Tel Aviv	0–3		Avi Cohen (43), Alon Natan (45), Beni Tabak (47)
6	13 January 1998	Friendly		Bat Yam Municipal Stadium	Maccabi Tel Aviv	Hapoel Tel Aviv	2–1	Elek Nyilas (45, 63)	Shalom Tikva (47)

== Gallery ==
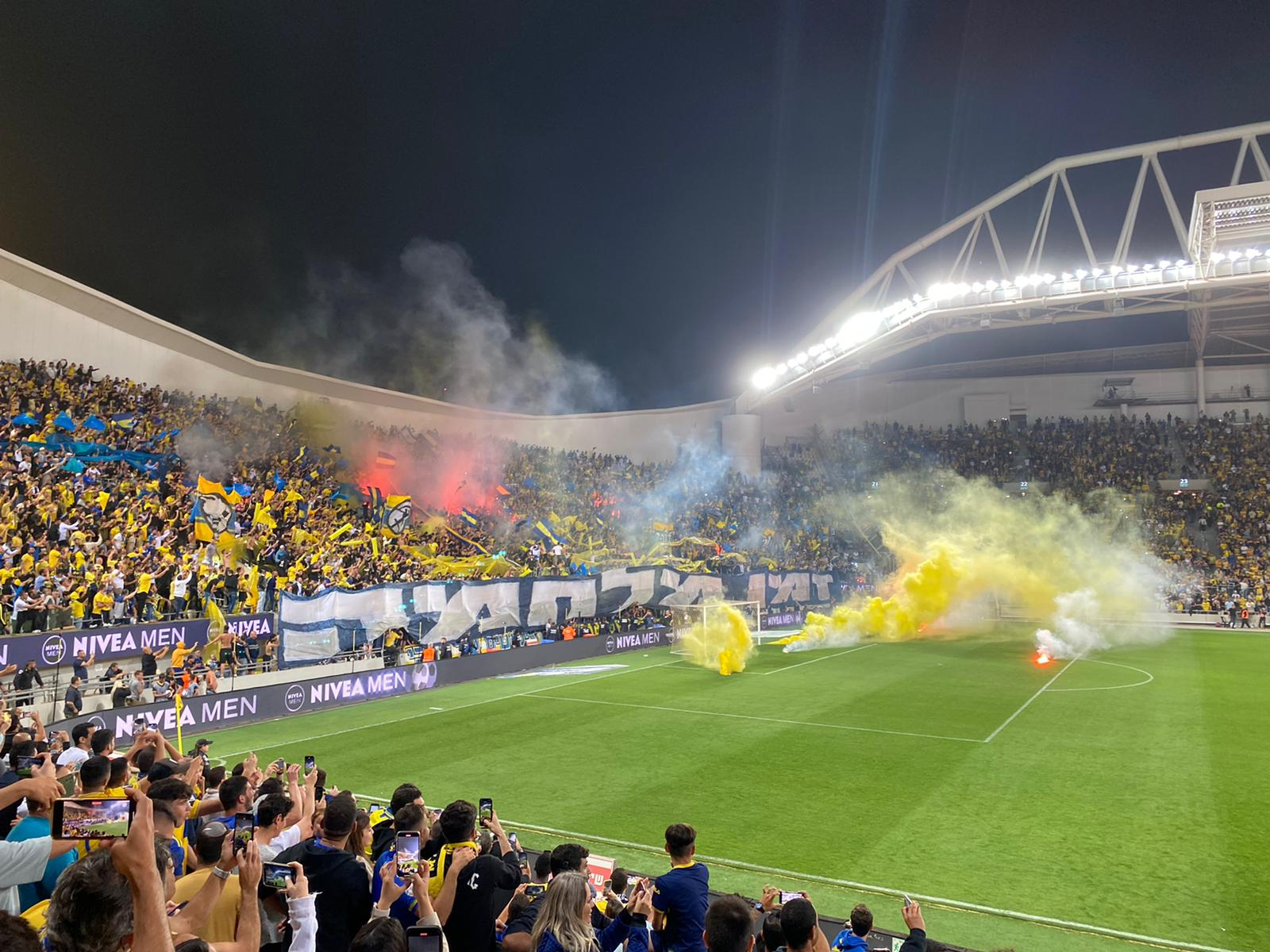

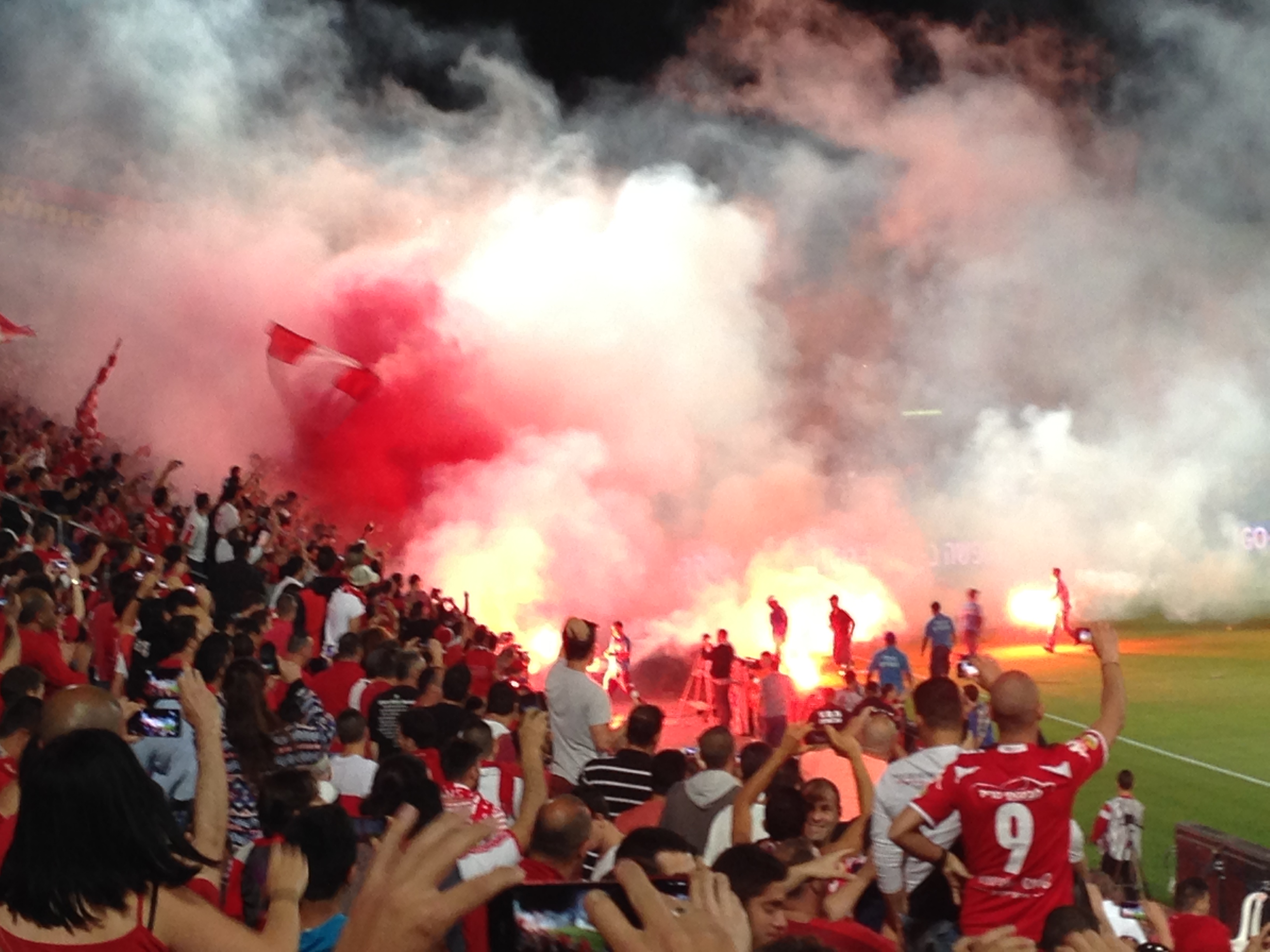

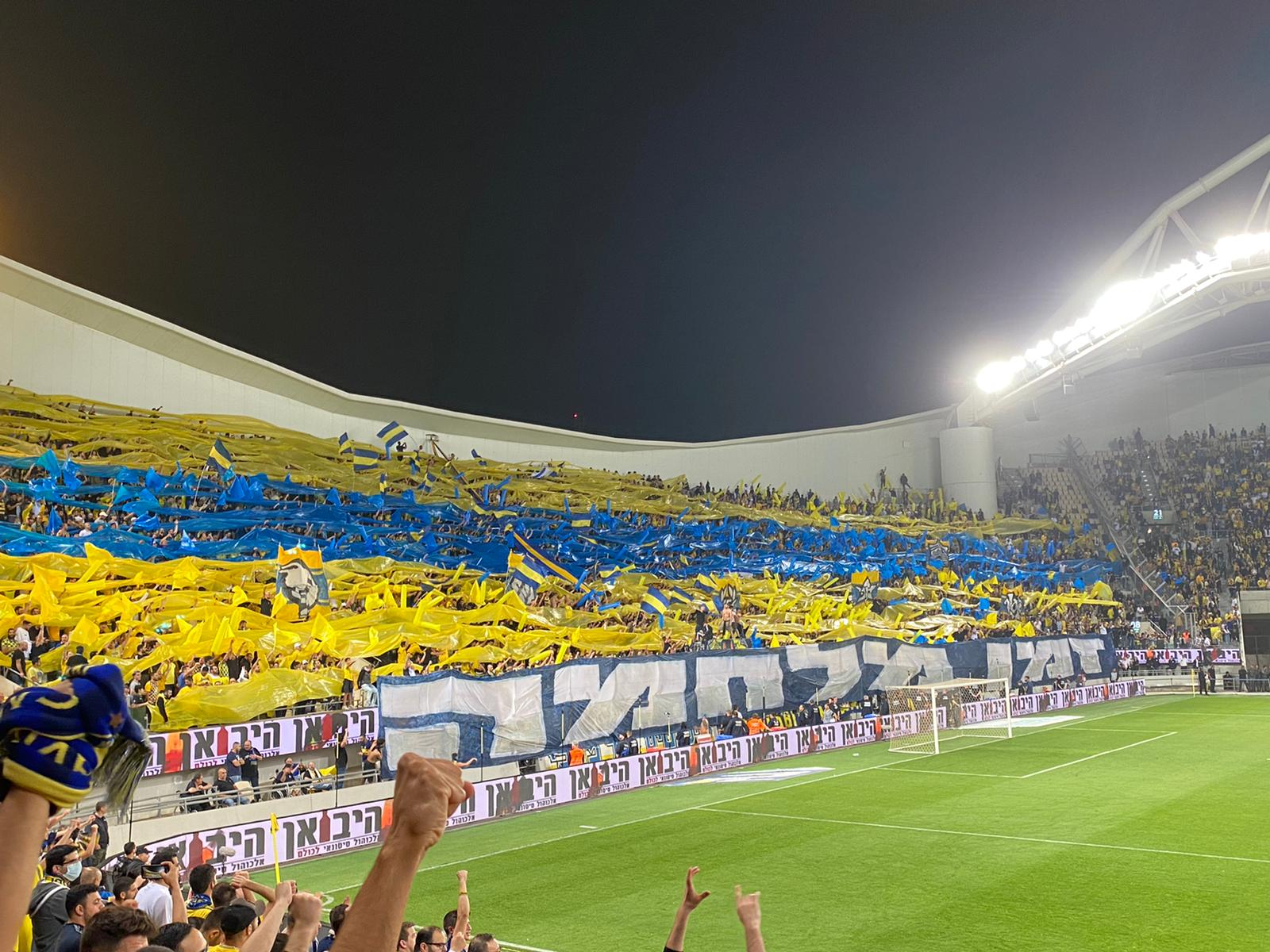

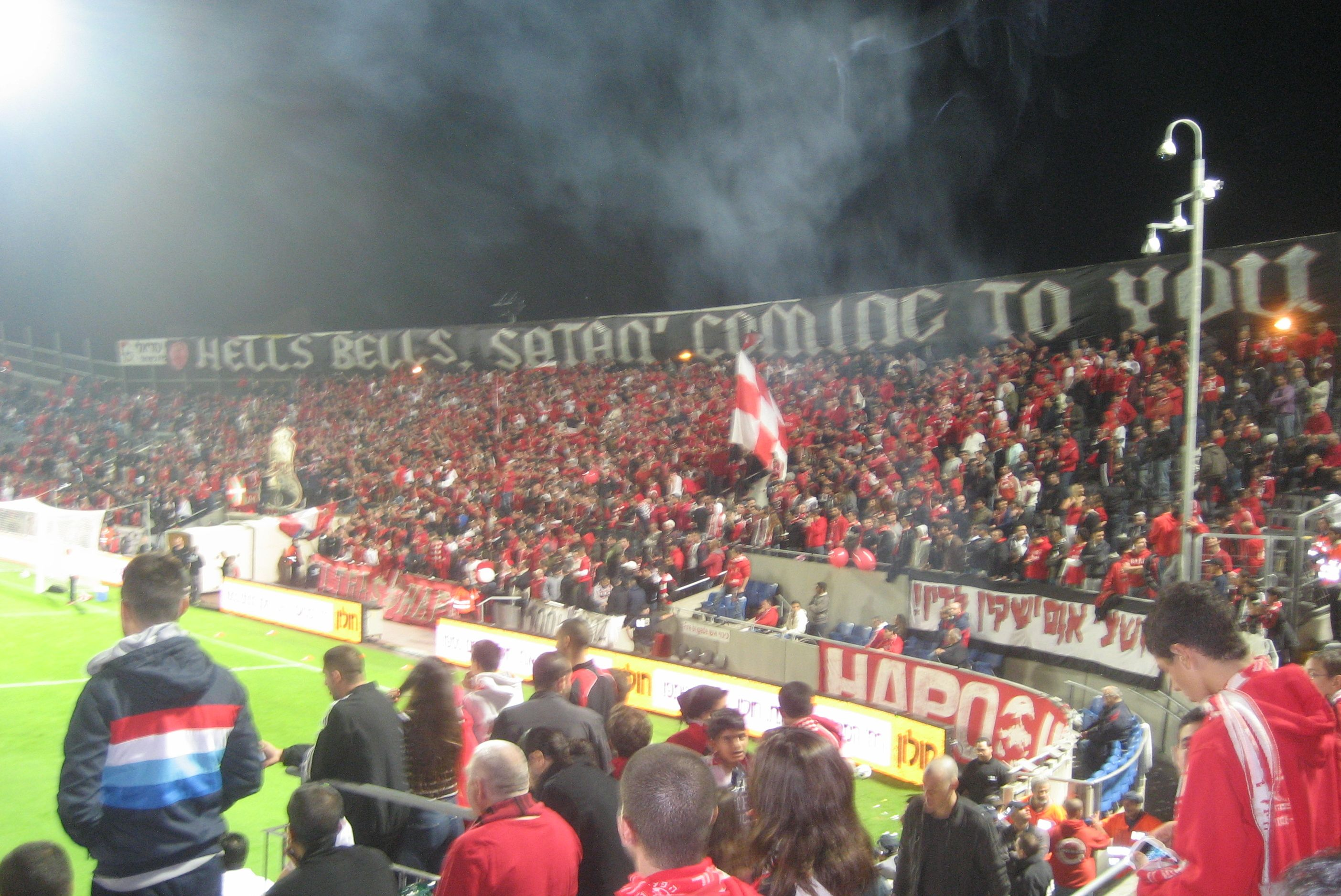

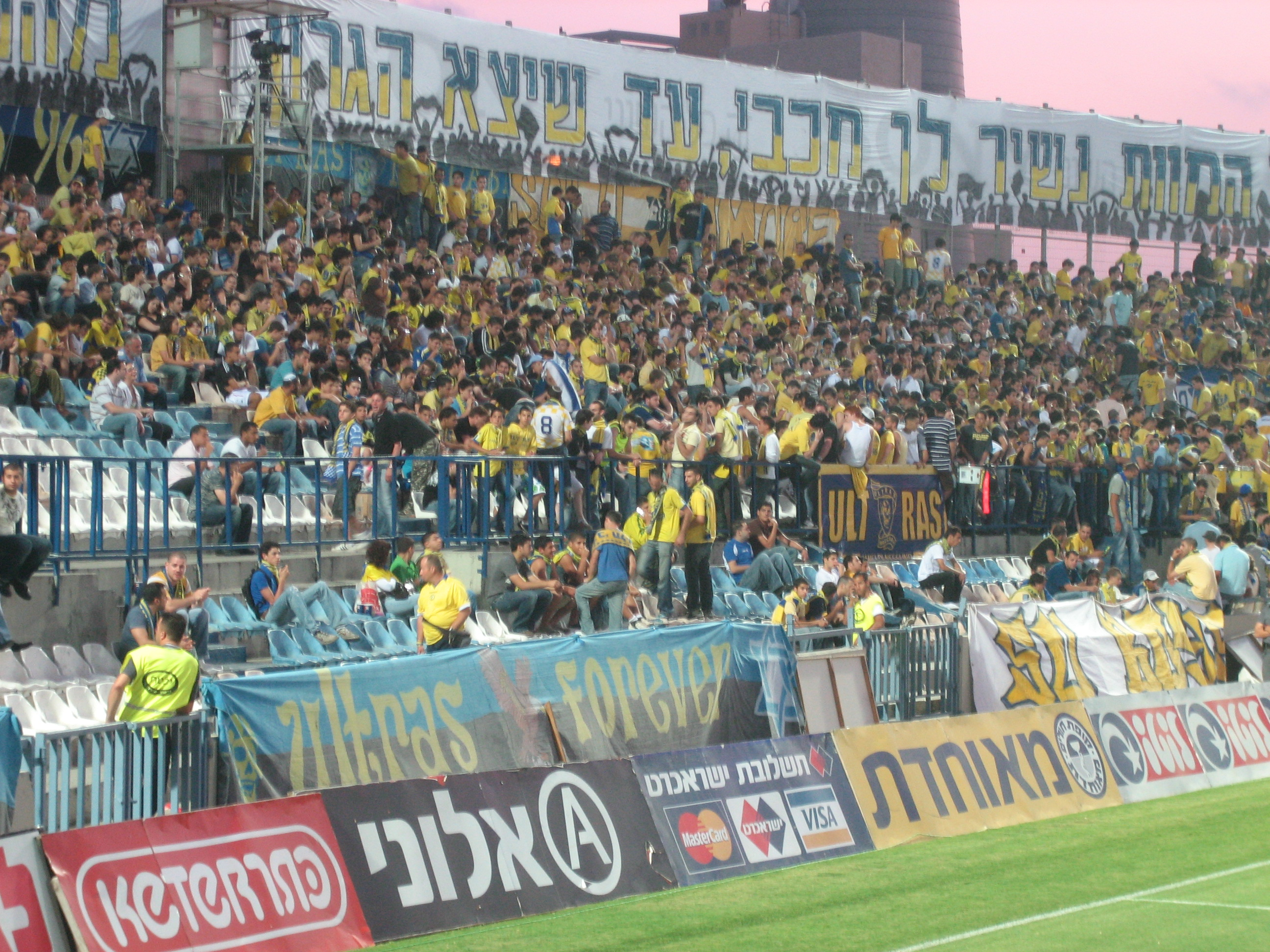

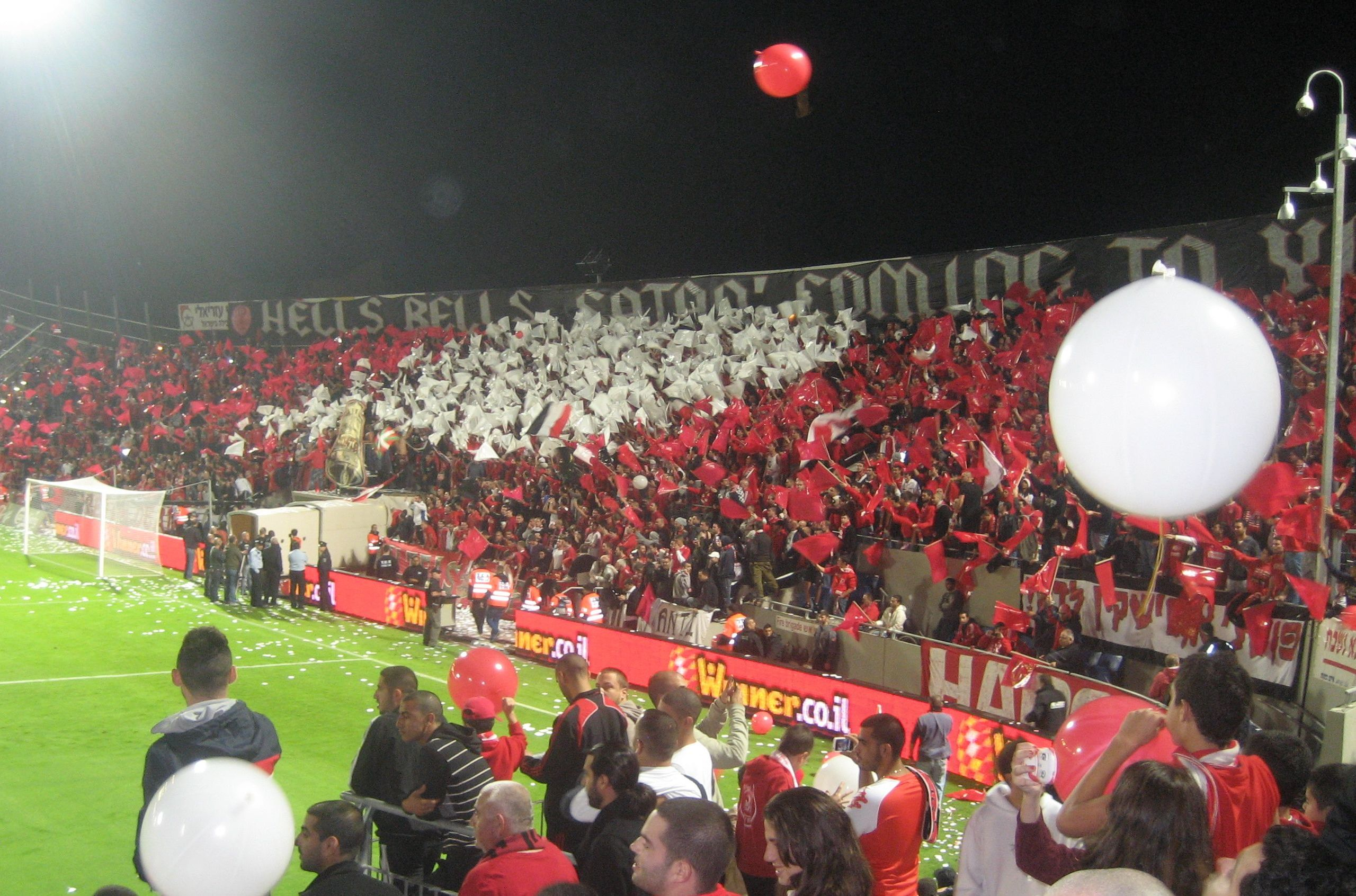
