= Beitar Jerusalem F.C.–Hapoel Tel Aviv F.C. rivalry =

Israeli sports rivalry

Beitar Jerusalem–Hapoel Tel Aviv rivalry
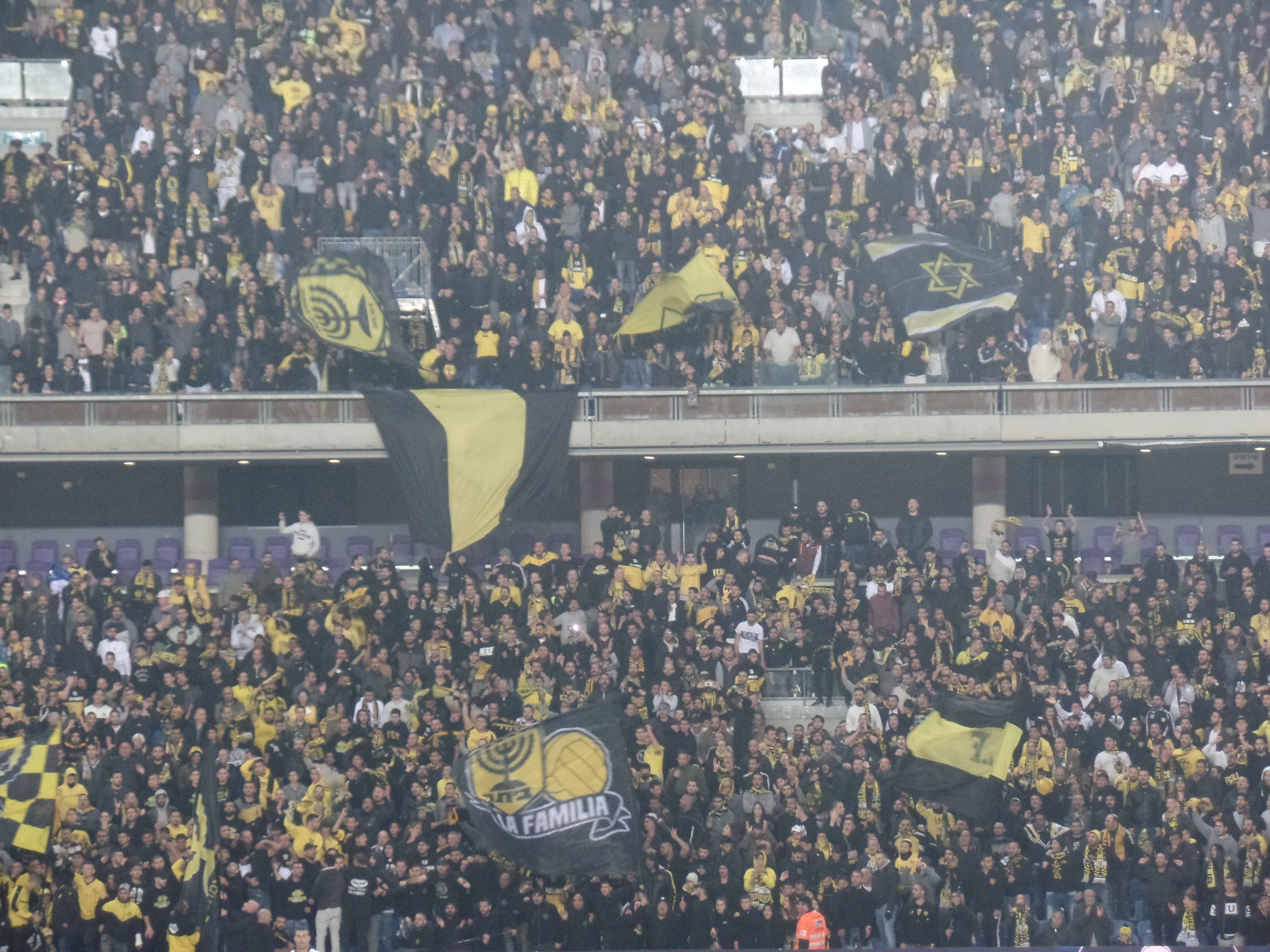
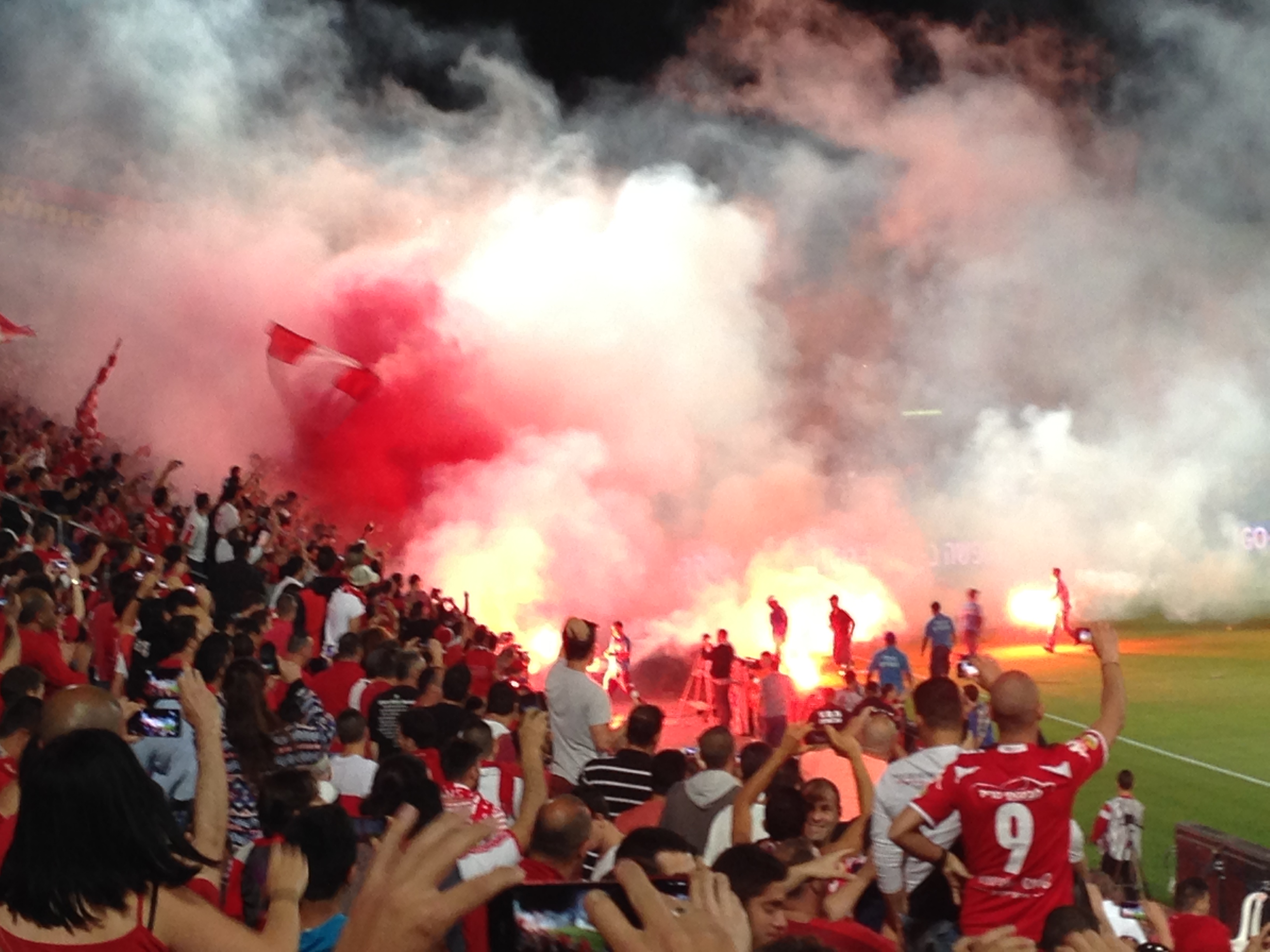
- Beitar Jerusalem Hapoel Tel Aviv
- Native name: היריבות בין בית"ר ירושלים לבין הפועל תל אביב
- Sport: Football
- First meeting: March 5, 1955; Beitar 2–2 Hapoel (Liga Alef)
- Latest meeting: January 22, 2024; Hapoel 0–1 Beitar (Israeli Premier League)
- Next meeting: TBA
- Stadiums: Teddy (Beitar Jerusalem) Bloomfield (Hapoel Tel Aviv)

Statistics
- Total meetings: Beitar Jerusalem: 39 Draws: 35 Hapoel Tel Aviv: 54
- Most wins: Hapoel Tel Aviv (54)
- Largest victory: 5-0 (both clubs)
- Largest goal scoring: 4-3 (Hapoel win), 2009-10 season.
- Longest win streak: Hapoel Tel Aviv (8 wins) Beitar Jerusalem (4 wins)
- Longest unbeaten streak: Hapoel Tel Aviv (18 games) Beitar Jerusalem (9 games)
- Current win streak: Beitar Jerusalem (1 game)

The Beitar Jerusalem F.C.–Hapoel Tel Aviv F.C. rivalry refers to the inter-city rivalry between Israeli football clubs Beitar Jerusalem and Hapoel Tel Aviv.

The rivalry stems from the political differences of the two clubs on the political spectrum as both represent opposites of the Zionist political spectrum, with Hapoel historically representing Labor Party voters and Beitar representing Likudniks.

Though historically, Hapoel Tel Aviv has been the far more successful of the two, the rivalry remains fierce due to the supporters of both clubs often inciting the other with political provocations such as in the 1999 State Cup Final, when Hapoel Tel Aviv supporters brought a banner that read "we fucked you in the elections, now we will fuck you on the pitch".

== Background ==
Hapoel Tel Aviv was officially founded in 1927 as a Hapoel affiliate club; its name translates to "the worker", and its original crest was the same as the Hapoel movement's logo which is that of the hammer and sickle.

Beitar Jerusalem was founded in 1936 as an affiliate of the Beitar sports group which itself was an affiliate of the far larger Revisionist Zionist movement of the same name; its crest was that of a menorah which was the same symbol used in the movement's logo.

Both clubs have been associated with politics since their inception, as well as being associated with different ethnic groups (Hapoel being an Ashkenazi club whereas Beitar are a Mizrahi club), though this association has become outdated in recent years, as both clubs have their share of non-Mizrahi and non-Ashkenazi supporters, especially in the case of Hapoel, which has garnered fans who are Palestinian citizens of Israel.

Both clubs have been associated with the working class.

The ultras of Beitar Jerusalem, more specifically La Familia, have attacked Hapoel Tel Aviv supporters in several acts of hooliganism.

Some politicians of the right wing have criticized Beitar's ultras, and have even went to games to support Hapoel. Other politicians, such as Itamar Ben-Gvir, have made their opinions on the club's rivalry with Hapoel quite clear.

== History ==
The two clubs would not meet until March 1955 in the then top-flight Liga Alef.

Beitar, who were then newly promoted to the top flight took on a veteran Hapoel team in the YMCA stadium, a match which ended in a 2–2 draw.

The return fixture at Bloomfield would also end in a draw, this time being 1-1.

At the end of that season Beitar were relegated back to Liga Bet.

The two clubs would not meet again until 1969, when Bloomfield hosted Beitar Jerusalem, the match ended prematurely in the 81st minute as Beitar supporters stormed the field and broke and burnt down the nets and goal posts before attacking the referee of the match Isaac Cohen, who was a new immigrant from the Soviet Union and making fun of his Russian descent by saying racist comments ("You are a dirty Jew, it's a shame you didn't stay in Siberia").

A Beitar supporter named Gideon Piro, serving in the IDF prevented Hapoel midfielder Ronnie Calderon from scoring Hapoel's fourth goal by pointing his gun at him.

The match would ultimately be ruled as a technical victory for Hapoel (3-0), which would also be Hapoel's first win against Beitar.

Hapoel's first win proper would arrive in a 2–0 win in May 1970.

Beitar would not be able to beat Hapoel until a Christmas Day match in 1976 when they beat Hapoel 2–0.

In the first 30 league fixtures between the two clubs, Hapoel won 14, 14 ended in a draw and only 2 ended in Beitar wins.

In the following years, the balance would shift in Beitar's favor, in the next 30 league fixtures, 15 ended in Beitar wins, 6 ended in draws and only 9 ended in Hapoel wins.

In the 1983/1984 season, in the penultimate round, Hapoel came to an away game against Beitar in its home stadium at the time, the YMCA Stadium. Beitar was then in a title race with Maccabi Haifa for their first league title in their history. In that game, Hapoel won 3–1, thanks to a fantastic performance by their star Moshe Sinai, thus robbing Beitar of a chance to clinch their first ever league title and thus also making Maccabi Haifa the champions. Despite both clubs having met in the past, and having existed for decades at this point, according to many this game marks the beginning of the bitter rivalry that exists to this day between the two clubs.

In the 1997-98 season, Beitar and Hapoel would not meet directly in the final matchday fixture, however both clubs had a chance at the title.

Hapoel would take on Hapoel Petah Tikva at Bloomfield and would win 1–0, thus giving them a chance at winning the title unless Beitar were to win their fixture.

Beitar's match, a road match against relegation threatened Beit Shan would become known as the "shoelaces game".

In the third minute of the game at the Kiryat Eliezer Stadium, Beit Shean took a 0–1 lead against Beitar with a goal by the Croatian Zaledko Ajic. Some time later, they were awarded a free kick from 11 meters, after Beitar Jerusalem defender Shmulik Levy pushed the ball away from his team's goal line. As a result of the incident, the player was sent off, and Beitar was down to ten men. Eitan Tayeb, Beit Shan's defender, who scored five goals in the season from 11-meter free kicks, missed the kick. Right before the halftime whistle, Beitar's equalizer came from Stephan Shaloy's header. In the 62nd minute, Beitar completed a turnaround after a free kick connected by Yossi Abukasis. Immediately after that, it was learned that Hapoel Beer Sheva had lost in Teddy, and therefore Beit Shean's survival in the league was guaranteed. In the 76th minute, in the corresponding match in Bloomfield, Hapoel Tel Aviv striker Kfir Udi scored from a Shalom Tikva assist to give his team a 0–1 lead against Hapoel Petah Tikva. Thus, Hapoel Tel Aviv remained within touching distance. from the first place. In the 86th minute, Beit Shan tied the score at 2–2 with a goal by Almog Hazan, a young player who scored his first goal in the league. Due to the draw at halftime, Hapoel Tel Aviv returned to the first place, since their game was already locked with a 0–1 victory over Hapoel Petah Tikva.

The Hapoel supporters, who had heard the news from Kiryat Eliezer, began to celebrate the team's return to first place, and even stormed the pitch as if they had clinched the title, even though the result of a draw in Beitar's game was not enough for Hapoel to clinch it. In the 93rd minute, in the last attack of the game, during a corner kick, Beitar scored a goal after an unsuccessful clearance by the Beit Shan defense. A close range shot from Ishtovan Pishont, made it 3-2 for Beitar. After the goal was scored, the Beitar crowd stormed the pitch and did not allow the game to resume. With the intervention of Moshe Dadash, the chairman of Beitar who feared that the game would be forcibly stopped and thus its result would not count, the crowd cleared the pitch, only to allow the referee to resume it and immediately blew the whistle for the end of the match. The game ended after 93 minutes and 30 seconds, when Beitar officially won the game and was one home win away from taking the championship title (there was one more game left until the end of the season). Meanwhile, the Hapoel fans who had already broken out to celebrate on the pitch were shown to be shocked by the sequence of dramatic events, while the Beitar fans were celebrating on the pitch of Kiryat Eliezer. Due to the media pressure and noise created by this game, two days after the game, Hapoel Beit Shean players were questioned by civilian intelligence. In a polygraph test conducted on all of the Beit Sha'an who played in the match - they claimed that they did not sell the game - and they all came out telling the truth.

In the aftermath, a defamatory album made by a Hapoel Tel Aviv supporter, titled "Friends sing Tayeb", which made fun of Hapoel Beit Sha'an and accused them of fixing the match to be in favor of Beitar Jerusalem was released before later being banned from sale due to its defamatory content.

Also in the aftermath, Beitar would win the league with just one point separating them and Hapoel Tel Aviv after beating Maccabi Petah Tikvah at home.

In 2011, a State Cup quarterfinal match between the two clubs ended in a riot between the two clubs supporters.

In recant years, both clubs have become far less relevant, with Hapoel entering administration and then being relegated in 2017, and Beitar narrowly avoiding relegation several times. Hapoel has not won any major trophies since 2012, although Beitar have recently ended their major trophy drought winning the State Cup in 2023.

Despite this, the rivalry has remained quite fierce, with fixtures between the two often involving racist provocative chants.

On March 5, 2023, before a match against Beitar, Hapoel's practice facility in South Tel Aviv was burnt down, five suspects were arrested the following day.

On October 2, 2023, following a 3-0 loss at home to Hapoel (which was the club's biggest away win against Beitar), Beitar fans went into the club's dressing room to curse and insult the players for such a humiliating loss. Also, yet another violent incident between both clubs fanbases occurred following the match.

== In popular culture ==
The rivalry has been referenced in several pieces of Israeli media since at least the 1970s, when HaGashash HaHiver made a sketch titled "offside story" centering around a court case between a football referee and a Beitar Jerusalem hooligan following an incident at a match in the derby.

== Honours ==
Domestic honours
Competition	Hapoel Tel Aviv		Beitar Jerusalem	
Competition	Titles	Year	Titles	Year
Israeli Football Championships	13	1933–34, 1934–35, 1938–39, 1940, 1943–44, 1956–57, 1965–66, 1968–69, 1980–81, 1985–86, 1987–88, 1999–2000, 2009–10	6	1986–87, 1992–93, 1996–97, 1997–98, 2006–07, 2007–08
Israel State Cup	16	1928, 1934, 1937, 1938, 1939, 1944, 1960–61, 1971–72, 1982–83, 1998–99, 1999–2000, 2005–06, 2006–07, 2009–10, 2010–11, 2011–12	8	1975–76, 1978–79, 1984–85, 1985–86, 1988–89, 2007–08, 2008–09, 2022-2023
Toto Cup	1	2001–02	3	1997–98, 2009–10 2019–20
Israel Super Cup	5	1957, 1966, 1969, 1970, 1981	2	1976, 1986
Other notable trophies	1	1955 Shapira Cup	2	1986 Lillian Cup, 2001 Peace Cup.
Domestic total	36		21	

== See also ==
- Football derbies in Israel
- Politics of Israel
