= 1981 Israel Super Cup =

Hapoel Tel Aviv	Bnei Yehuda
1	0
- Date: 5 September 1981
- Venue: Bloomfield Stadium, Tel Aviv
- Referee: Yosef Diamant
- Attendance: 8,000

The 1981 Israel Super Cup was the 11th Israel Super Cup (16th, including unofficial matches, as the competition wasn't played within the Israel Football Association in its first 5 editions, until 1969), an annual Israel football match played between the winners of the previous season's Top Division and Israel State Cup.

The match was played between Hapoel Tel Aviv, champions of the 1980–81 Liga Leumit and Bnei Yehuda, winners of the 1980–81 Israel State Cup.

This was Hapoel's 5th Israel Super Cup appearance and Bnei Yehuda's second (both including unofficial matches). At the match, played at Bloomfield Stadium, Hapoel Tel Aviv won 1–0.

== Match details ==
5 September 1981

Hapoel Tel Aviv	1–0	Bnei Yehuda
Sinai 34'

Bloomfield Stadium, Tel Aviv
Attendance: 8,000
Referee: Yosef Diamant

Hapoel Tel Aviv	Bnei Yehuda

GK	(Israel) Arie Bejerano
RB	(Israel) Nimrod Dreifus (c)
CB	(Israel) Benny Cohen
CB	(Israel) Yossi Zana
LB	(Israel) Eli Cohen
CM	(Israel) Eyal Eckstein	Substituted off
CM	(Israel) Meir Nahmias
CM	(Israel) Ya'akov Ekhoiz
FW	(Israel) Gabi Lasri
FW	(Israel) Moshe Sinai
FW	(Israel) Shabtai Levy
Substitutes:
MF	(Israel) Shabtai Yachbas	Substituted in
Manager:
(Israel) David Schweitzer

GK	(Israel) Roni Hamdani
RB	(Israel) Izhar Nozhik	Substituted off
DF	(Israel) Yoram Orenstein
DF	(Israel) Doron Rosenthal
LB	(Israel) Moshe Alu
CM	(Israel) Rami Levy
CM	(Israel) Menachem Mor
CM	(Israel) Uri Luzon
FW	(Israel) Ehud Ben Tuvim
FW	(Israel) Moshe Yechiel	Substituted off
FW	(Israel) Avinoam Malihi
Substitutes:
MF	(Israel) Alon Tzuberi	Substituted in
FW	(Israel) Klemi Sharvit	Substituted in
Manager:
(Israel) Shlomo Sharf
