= 1986 Lilian Cup =

1986 League Cup

Tournament details
- Country: Israel
- Dates: 2 – 9 September 1986
- Teams: 4

Final positions
- Champions: Maccabi Tel Aviv
- Runners-up: Maccabi Haifa

Tournament statistics
- Matches played: 4
- Goals scored: 10 (2.5 per match)
- Top goal scorer(s): Zahi Armeli (M. Haifa) (2)

The 1986 Lilian Cup was the 5th season of the competition. The four top placed teams for the previous season took part in the competition.

The format of the competition was changed from including a group stage prior to the final to a straight knock-out competition. The competition was held between 2 and 10 September 1986.

The competition was won by Maccabi Tel Aviv, who had beaten Maccabi Haifa 2–1 in the final.

== Results ==
=== Semi-finals ===
2 September 1986	Hapoel Tel Aviv	1–3	Maccabi Tel Aviv	Ramat Gan
	Amar 89'		Goldberg 3'; Tabak 38'; Natan 40' (pen.)	Stadium: Ramat Gan Stadium; Attendance: 600; Referee: Itzhak Ben Itzhak

2 September 1986	Maccabi Haifa	2–0	Beitar Jerusalem	Ramat Gan
	Armeli 76', 86'			Stadium: Ramat Gan Stadium; Attendance: 800; Referee: Ya'akove Shiner

=== 3rd-4th Place Match ===
9 September 1986

Hapoel Tel Aviv	1–0	Beitar Jerusalem
Ekhoiz 81'

Ramat Gan Stadium
Attendance: 500
Referee: Ovadia Tzvi

=== Final ===
9 September 1986

Maccabi Haifa	1–2	Maccabi Tel Aviv
Selecter 73'		Oded Machnes 74'; Azulai 79'

Ramat Gan Stadium
Attendance: 1500
Referee: Ovadia Ben Itzhak
