= Football derbies in Israel =

This is a list of the main association football rivalries in Israel.

== National rivalries ==
- Political rivalry: Hapoel Tel Aviv vs. Beitar Jerusalem
- Tel Aviv vs. Haifa rivalry ("The Israeli Clasico"): Maccabi Tel Aviv vs. Maccabi Haifa.
- Religious/ethnic rivalry: Beitar Jerusalem vs. Bnei Sakhnin
- Be'er Sheva vs. Netanya rivalry: Hapoel Be'er Sheva vs. Maccabi Netanya

== City derbies ==
- Tel Aviv derbies:
  - Tel Aviv derby: Maccabi Tel Aviv vs. Hapoel Tel Aviv
  - Eastern Derby: Hapoel Kfar Shalem vs. Bnei Yehuda Tel Aviv
  - Tel Aviv mini-derby: Maccabi Tel Aviv or Hapoel Tel Aviv vs. Bnei Yehuda Tel Aviv and in also the past Beitar Tel Aviv, Shimson Tel Aviv and Maccabi Jaffa.
- Haifa derby: Maccabi Haifa vs. Hapoel Haifa
- Jerusalem derby: Beitar Jerusalem vs. Hapoel Jerusalem
- Ramat Gan derby: Hapoel Ramat Gan vs. Hakoah Amidar Ramat Gan
- Petah Tikva derby (Melabes Derby): Maccabi Petah Tikva vs. Hapoel Petah Tikva
- Rehovot derby (derby HaShkhonot): Maccabi Sha'arayim vs. Hapoel Marmorek
- Ashdod derby: Hapoel Ashdod vs. Maccabi Ironi Ashdod
- Herzeliya derby: Hapoel Herzliya vs. Maccabi Herzliya

== Regional derbies ==
- South derby: Hapoel Be'er Sheva vs. F.C Ashdod
- Sharon derbies:
  - Maccabi Netanya vs. Hapoel Hadera
  - Hapoel Ra'anana vs. Hapoel Kfar Saba
  - Ramat HaSharon vs. Maccabi Herzliya
