= Avi Ran =

Israeli footballer

Avi Ran אבי רן
Personal information
- Full name: Avi Ran
- Date of birth: August 25, 1963
- Place of birth: Haifa, Israel
- Date of death: July 11, 1987 (aged 23)
- Place of death: Tiberias, Israel
- Height: 1.85 m (6 ft 1 in)
- Position: Goalkeeper

Senior career*
Years	Team	Apps	(Gls)
1981–1987	Maccabi Haifa	165	(0)

International career
1986–1987	Israel	9	(0)
- * Club domestic league appearances and goals

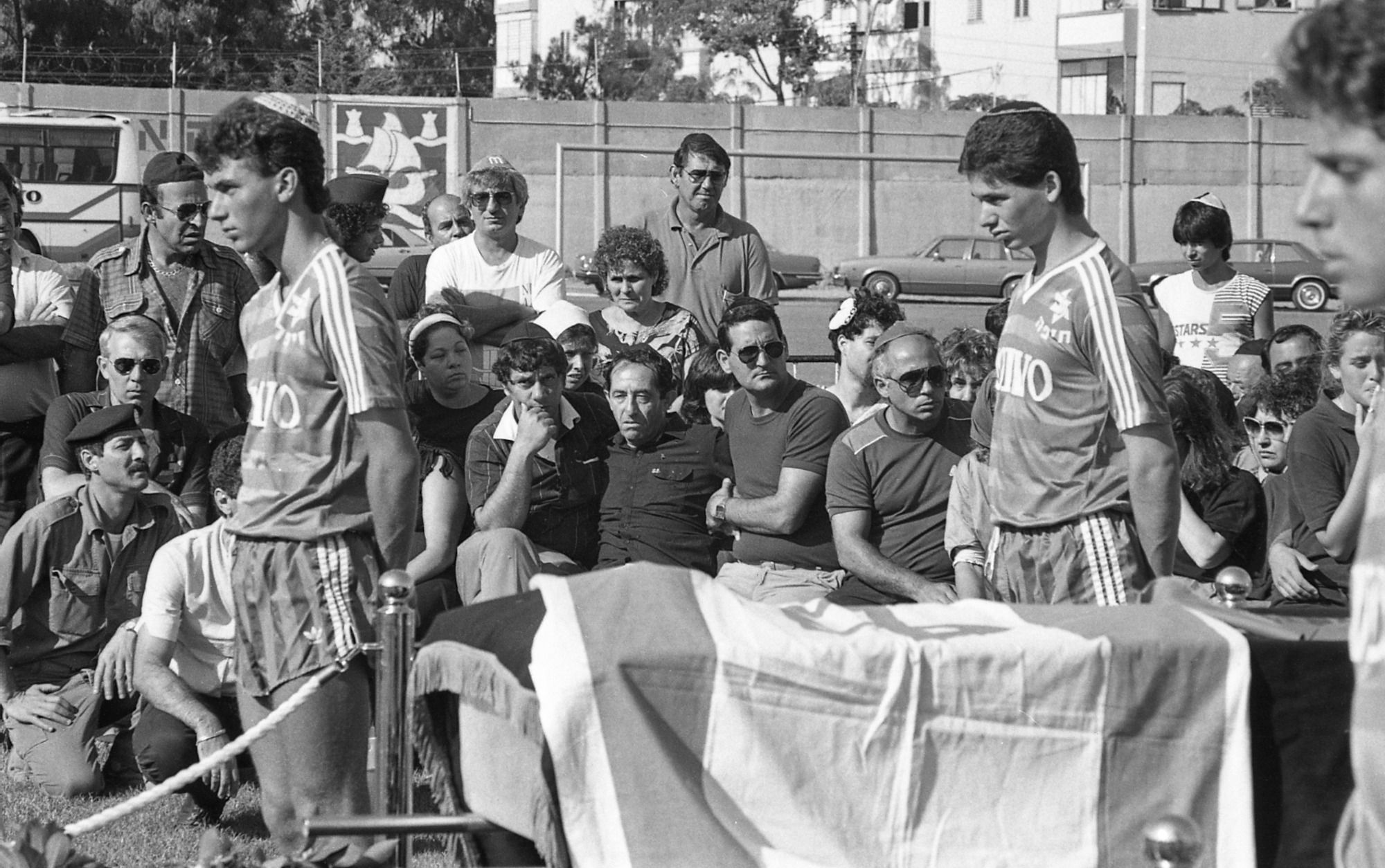
Funeral of Avi Ran, July 1987

Avi Ran (Hebrew: אבי רן; August 25, 1963 – July 11, 1987) was a goalkeeper at the Israeli football club Maccabi Haifa. Widely considered one of the greatest football players in Israel, he had a promising future which was cut short by a fatal accident.

== Football career ==
Ran made his debut in Haifa's senior team in the 1981–82 season at the age of 17 in a match against Maccabi Tel Aviv, keeping a clean sheet in the process. Ran went on to play for most of the season, competing for his place in the team with Zadok Avrahami. The competition was tough, but Ran was known for his perseverance and diligence in training, as well as his good manners and social character - which earned him a social status of loud and sympathetic off the pitch.

During the 1983–84 season Shlomo Scharf came to Maccabi Haifa. Looking for a new coach and veteran instead of 20-year-old Ran, he attempted to release Ran and replace him with Arie Haviv from Hapoel Yehud. Being a popular social figure in the group, a wave of protests occurred from a number of players, such as Baruch Maman and Ronnie Rosenthal, who requested that Scharf let him stay, but he would not listen to them. Yohanan Volach, who was key in preventing the release of many players (including Rosenthal, Moshe Selektar, Rafi Osmo and Yossi Kremer), torpedoed the move and managed to prevent the release of Ran. Volach believed in the young goalkeeper, and knew of his ability and potential from when he was a child.

Ran did not disappoint, and his performances for Haifa revealed an excellent goalkeeper. Ya'akov Hodorov. Ran helped to Haifa to win the first Israeli Premier League title in its history, conceding only 28 goals. In Ran's second season he was already established as one of Maccabi Haifa's key players Maccabi Haifa, and again impressed as he broke a club record, conceding only 18 goals as Haifa won the title for the second year in succession. That season saw Haifa come close to winning the double as they also reached the cup final, although they lost to Beitar Jerusalem. In 1986, Maccabi Haifa came close to success again, topping the table for most of the season. However, the Championship was won by Hapoel Tel Aviv on the final day, as they faced off with Haifa in a game that would decide the title winners. With Haifa sitting just 1 point above second placed Tel Aviv, an 86th minute goal by Gili Landau, which was later adjudged to have been offside, won Tel Aviv the title by just 2 points. Ran excelled that year and was named player of the season, although his team narrowly lost the championship.

That same year saw Haifa play outside of Israel for the first time. Rumours circulated of a possible move for Ran to a European club, including Liverpool. Exhibition games were held in Israel, and Ran played one of the best games in his career. Liverpool were very impressed by the showing of Haifa and wanted to sign him. Ran played nine games the team, eight of which resulted in a loss, and one a draw.

In 1987, Maccabi Haifa finished low down in the table in ninth place, but Ran maintained his status as a key player, although many other key players were released from the club.

- Won 2 championships with Maccabi Haifa.
- Conceded only 18 goals in the 1985–86 season, the lowest in Maccabi Haifa's history.
- Won Maariv's 1986 "footballer of the year" award (i.e. the MVP of the season).
- Was goalkeeper of the Israel national team.

== Fatal accident ==
On 11 July 1987, Ran was killed on the "Guy" beach in Tiberias when he was hit by a passing racing boat whilst Maccabi Haifa were on a vacation off season in the Sea of Galilee. 14,000 people attended Ran's funeral.

== Legacy ==
Ran would be honored by Maccabi Haifa with a stand being named in his honor. As well as having a street named after him in Kiryat Eliezer, the neighborhood Maccabi Haifa used to play in. He was also honored with a postal stamp where he is seen playing for the Israel national team. Ran received a statue outside of Ramat Gan Stadium as well.

The Israel Youth State Cup is named in his honor.

== Career statistics ==
Club performance			League		Cup		League Cup		Continental		Total	
Season	Club	League	Apps	Goals	Apps	Goals	Apps	Goals	Apps	Goals	Apps	Goals
Israel			League		Israel State Cup		Toto Cup		Europe		Total	
1981-82	Maccabi Haifa	Liga Leumit	20	0								
1982-83	Maccabi Haifa	Liga Leumit	10	0								
1983-84	Maccabi Haifa	Liga Leumit	25	0								
1984-85	Maccabi Haifa	Liga Leumit	30	0								
1985-86	Maccabi Haifa	Liga Leumit	30	0								
1986-87	Maccabi Haifa	Liga Leumit	30	0								
Total	Israel		145	0								
Career total			145	0								
