= Selector =

Selector may refer to:

- Selector, electrical or mechanical component, a switch
- Selector, music scheduling software for radio stations created by Radio Computing Services
- Selector, of music, otherwise known as a disc jockey
- Selector, a person who made a selection of crown land in some Australian colonies
- Selector (sport), person that chooses players for a sports team
- Selector, part of Cascading Style Sheets programming language
- "Selector", a song by Skindred from the 2002 album Babylon
- Selector, part of Objective-C programming language
- The Selector, radio program
- Choice function on a family of sets

== See also ==
- The Selecter, a UK ska band
- Moshe Selecter, Israeli footballer
