= Lasri =

Lasri or Lasry is a surname. Notable people with the surname include:

- Alex Lasry (born 1987), American businessman and basketball executive
- Gabi Lasri, Israeli footballer
- Hicham Lasri (born 1977), Moroccan film director and novelist
- Lex Lasry, Australian lawyer and judge
- Marc Lasry (born 1959), Moroccan American businessman and hedge fund manager
- Yehiel Lasri (born 1957), Israeli physician and politician
