= 1982–83 Israel State Cup =

Tournament details
- Country: Israel

Final positions
- Champions: Hapoel Tel Aviv (8th Title)
- Runners-up: Maccabi Tel Aviv

The 1982–83 Israel State Cup (Hebrew: גביע המדינה, Gvia HaMedina) was the 44th season of Israel's nationwide football cup competition and the 29th after the Israeli Declaration of Independence.

The competition was won by Hapoel Tel Aviv who have beaten Maccabi Tel Aviv 3–2 in the final, the deciding goal being scored by Gili Landau, who used his hand to score the goal.

== Results ==
=== Fifth Round ===
Home team	Score	Away team
Bnei Hatzor	3–3 (a.e.t.) 3–5 p.	Maccabi Herzliya
Maccabi HaShikma Ramat Gan	5–0	Maccabi Yehud
Hapoel Kiryat Ono	6–0	Hapoel Nahariya
Hapoel Bnei Nazareth	1–1; Abandoned	Beitar Haifa
Maccabi Hadera	1–1 (a.e.t.) 5–3 p.	Hapoel Ramat HaSharon
Maccabi Kiryat Bilalik	2–0	Maccabi Ahi Nazareth
Maccabi Kiryat Gat	1–0	Maccabi Sha'arayim
Hapoel Ahva Haifa	4–3	Hapoel Yeruham
Hapoel Ashdod	2–0	Maccabi Rehovot
Hapoel Neve Golan	3–1	Beitar Pardes Hanna
Hapoel Tira	2–0	Hapoel Migdal HaEmek
Hapoel Tirat HaCarmel	3–0	Hapoel Tzafririm Holon
Maccabi Lazaros Holon	2–1	Hapoel Sderot
Maccabi Or Akiva	3–1 (a.e.t.)	Hapoel Kiryat Ata
Hapoel Ramla	1–1 (a.e.t.) 1–3 p.	Hapoel Marmorek
Hapoel Afikim	2–2 (a.e.t.) 4–2 p.	Ironi Ashdod

=== Sixth Round ===
Home team	Score	Away team
Hapoel Rishon LeZion	1–0	Hapoel Nazareth Illit
Maccabi Shefa-'Amr	4–0	Hapoel Beit Shemesh
Hapoel Marmorek	2–1	Hapoel Kiryat Ono
Hapoel Petah Tikva	2–1	Hapoel Beit She'an
Maccabi Hadera	2–1	Hapoel Ahva Haifa
Hapoel Afikim	2–1	Hapoel Tel Hanan
Hapoel Neve Golan	1–1, replay: 0–6	Hapoel Ashkelon
Maccabi Kiryat Gat	0–0, replay: 1–0	Hapoel Tira
Hapoel Tirat HaCarmel	1–1, replay: 1–0	Hapoel Haifa
Maccabi Ramat Amidar	1–1, replay: 2–1	Maccabi HaShikma Ramat Gan
Hapoel Ashdod	1–1, replay: 1–3 (a.e.t.)	Maccabi Lazaros Holon
Maccabi Herzliya	0–1	Hapoel Acre
Maccabi Kiryat Bilalik	0–2	Beitar Tel Aviv
Hapoel Kiryat Shmona	3–1	Maccabi Or Akiva
Hapoel Hadera	2–2, replay: 1–1, 4–3 p.	Beitar Ramla
Hakoah Maccabi Ramat Gan	1–0	Beitar Haifa

=== Seventh Round ===
Home team	Score	Away team
Maccabi Lazaros Holon	2–0	Hapoel Kfar Saba
Hapoel Marmorek	1–2	Hapoel Tel Aviv
Hapoel Jerusalem	3–0	Maccabi Kiryat Gat
Maccabi Jaffa	0–1	Hakoah Maccabi Ramat Gan
Hapoel Hadera	1–2 (a.e.t.)	Hapoel Yehud
Maccabi Netanya	7–1	Maccabi Hadera
Hapoel Kiryat Shmona	0–0, replay: 0–0, 6–5 p.	Shimshon Tel Aviv
Maccabi Tel Aviv	3–0	Hapoel Afikim
Maccabi Petah Tikva	1–1, replay: 0–1	Maccabi Ramat Amidar
Hapoel Petah Tikva	0–1	Hapoel Be'er Sheva
Hapoel Lod	3–1	Beitar Tel Aviv
Hapoel Tirat HaCarmel	3–0	Hapoel Ramat Gan
Hapoel Rishon LeZion	2–2, replay: 0–1	Maccabi Haifa
Hapoel Acre	1–1, replay: 0–3	Beitar Jerusalem
Bnei Yehuda	1–1, replay: 0–0, 11–12 p.	Hapoel Ashkelon
Maccabi Yavne	2–1	Maccabi Shefa-'Amr

=== Round of 16 ===
Home team	Score	Away team
Maccabi Ramat Amidar	1–4	Hapoel Tel Aviv
Hapoel Lod	1–0	Maccabi Yavne
Maccabi Netanya	4–1	Hapoel Ashkelon
Hapoel Be'er Sheva	0–0, replay: 1–1, 4–2 p.	Hapoel Tirat HaCarmel
Hapoel Jerusalem	3–1	Maccabi Lazaros Holon
Beitar Jerusalem	1–0	Hapoel Yehud
Hakoah Maccabi Ramat Gan	1–2	Maccabi Haifa
Maccabi Tel Aviv	2–0	Hapoel Kiryat Shmona

=== Quarter-finals ===
Home team	Score	Away team
Hapoel Jerusalem	0–1	Maccabi Haifa
Maccabi Tel Aviv	2–1	Hapoel Be'er Sheva
Hapoel Tel Aviv	2–0	Beitar Jerusalem
Hapoel Lod	2–1	Maccabi Netanya

=== Semi-finals ===
Home team	Score	Away team
Maccabi Tel Aviv	4–4 (a.e.t.) 5–4 p.	Maccabi Haifa
Hapoel Tel Aviv	3–0	Hapoel Lod

=== Final ===
1 June 1983

Hapoel Tel Aviv	3–2	Maccabi Tel Aviv
Ekhoiz 25'; Sinai 34'; Landau 67'		Schweitzer 40'; Zana 60' (o.g.)

Ramat Gan Stadium
Attendance: 30000
Referee: Ben Itzhak
