= 2020–21 Beitar Jerusalem F.C. season =

Beitar Jerusalem
2020–21 season
- Chairman: (Israel) Eli Ohana
- Manager: (Israel) Yossi Mizrahi
- Stadium: Teddy Stadium
- Israeli Premier League: 8th
- Toto Cup Al: 3rd
- UEFA Europa League: First qualifying round
- State Cup: Round of 16
- Top goalscorer: League: Eliran Atar (11); All: Eliran Atar (11)
Home colours	Away colours	Third colours

Beitar Jerusalem are an Israeli football club based in Jerusalem. The 2020–21 season will be the clubs 84th competitive campaign since the club were formed. During this season the club will have competed in the following competitions: Israeli Premier League, Toto Cup Al, UEFA Europa League, State Cup.

== Players ==
=== Current squad ===
As of 7 September 2020

Note: Flags indicate national team as defined under FIFA eligibility rules; some limited exceptions apply. Players may hold more than one non-FIFA nationality.

No.	Pos.	Nation	Player
1	GK	ISR	Itamar Nitzan
2	DF	FRA	Antoine Conte
3	DF	ISR	Oren Biton
5	DF	POR	Diogo Verdasca
6	MF	ISR	Aviel Zargari
8	MF	ISR	Idan Vered (captain)
10	MF	BRA	Matheusinho
11	MF	ISR	Michael Ohana
12	MF	ISR	Liran Rotman
13	MF	ISR	Roy Doga
16	FW	ISR	Eliran Atar
17	FW	ISR	Uziel Pardo
19	MF	ISR	Shalom Edri

No.	Pos.	Nation	Player
20	FW	ISR	Yarden Shua
21	DF	PAR	Santiago Ocampos
22	GK	ISR	Netanel Daloya
23	MF	ISR	Tamir Adi
24	MF	ISR	Ofir Kriaf
26	DF	ISR	Tal Ben Haim
28	DF	ISR	Uri Magbo
33	GK	ISR	Roy Sason
39	FW	SUR	Gleofilo Vlijter
44	DF	ISR	Orel Dgani
55	MF	NIG	Ali Mohamed
77	DF	ISR	Shay Konstantini
—	DF	ISR	Idan Weintraub

=== On loan ===
No.	Pos.	Nation	Player
—	GK	ISR	Ofek Ivri (to Hapoel Ashkelon)
—	DF	ISR	Max Grechkin (at Zorya Luhansk until 30 June 2021)
—	DF	ISR	Yakir Artzi (at Hapoel Ramat HaSharon until 30 June 2021)
—	DF	ISR	Yurai Maliach (to Hapoel Jerusalem until 30 June 2021)
—	DF	ISR	Ya'akov Mizrahi (at Hapoel Ramat HaSharon until 30 June 2021)
—	DF	ISR	Noam Heftzedi (to Nordia Jerusalem)

No.	Pos.	Nation	Player
—	DF	ISR	David Tubul (to Maccabi Ironi Sderot)
—	DF	ISR	Oz Siton (to Hakoah Amidar Ramat Gan)
—	DF	ISR	Daniel Hava (to Nordia Jerusalem)
—	MF	ISR	Dor Konstantinos (to Nordia Jerusalem)
—	MF	ISR	Niv Badash (to Nordia Jerusalem)
—	MF	ISR	Rotem Sastiel (to Nordia Jerusalem)
—	MF	ISR	Gadi Kinda (at Sporting Kansas City until 30 December 2020)

== Competitions ==
=== Overview ===
Competition	First match	Last match	Starting round	Final position	Record							
Competition	First match	Last match	Starting round	Final position	Pld	W	D	L	GF	GA	GD	Win %
Premier League	30 August 2020		Matchday 1		14	4	5	5	19	15	+4	28.57
State Cup	17 January 2021		Eighth Round		0	0	0	0	0	0	+0	—
Toto Cup	8 August 2020	22 August 2020	Matchday 1	3rd	4	2	2	0	3	0	+3	50.00
UEFA Europa League	27 August 2020		First qualifying round	First qualifying round	1	0	0	1	0	2	−2	0.00
Total					19	6	7	6	22	17	+5	31.58

Last updated: 21 January 2021
Source: Competitions

=== Israeli Premier League ===
==== League table ====
Pos	Team	Pld	W	D	L	GF	GA	GD	Pts	Qualification or relegation
6	Maccabi Petah Tikva	26	11	4	11	24	23	+1	37	Qualification for the Championship round
7	Maccabi Netanya	26	9	7	10	35	30	+5	34	Transfer to the Relegation round
8	Beitar Jerusalem	26	8	8	10	31	32	−1	32	Transfer to the Relegation round
9	Hapoel Hadera	26	8	8	10	26	28	−2	32	Transfer to the Relegation round
10	Hapoel Haifa	26	7	9	10	30	37	−7	30	Transfer to the Relegation round

Source: Soccerway
Rules for classification: 1) Points; 2) Goal difference; 3) Matches won; 4) Goals scored; 5) Head-to-head points; 6) Head-to-head goal difference; 7) Head-to-head goals scored; 8) Play-off.

==== Results summary ====
Overall								Home						Away					
Pld	W	D	L	GF	GA	GD	Pts	W	D	L	GF	GA	GD	W	D	L	GF	GA	GD
16	5	5	6	21	16	+5	20	2	3	4	12	11	+1	3	2	2	9	5	+4

Last updated: 26 January 2021.
Source: Competitive Matches

==== Results by round ====
Round	1	2	3	4	5	6	7	8	9	10	11	12	13	14	15	16	17	18	19	20	21	22	23
Ground	A	A	H	A	H	H	A	H	H	H	A	A	H	H	A	A	H	H	A	H	A	A	A
Result	W	D	W	L	D	L	L	L	W	D	D	D	L	D	W	W	L						
Position	7	6	8	9	2	6	9	9	12	12	10	10	9	9	9	9	9						

Updated to match(es) played on 26 January 2021. Source: Competitive Matches
A = Away; H = Home; W = Win; D = Draw; L = Loss

==== Matches ====
30 August 2020 1	Hapoel Haifa	0–1	Beitar Jerusalem	Haifa
20:15		Report	Konstantini 90+3'	Stadium: Sammy Ofer Stadium; Attendance: 0 Referee: Roi Reinshreiber

31 October 2020 4	Hapoel Tel Aviv	1–1	Beitar Jerusalem	Tel Aviv
17:50	Altman 45+3' (pen.)	Report	Ohana 59'	Stadium: Bloomfield Stadium; Attendance: 0 Referee: Roi Reinshreiber

4 November 2020 2	Beitar Jerusalem	4–0	Hapoel Hadera	Jerusalem
20:00	Atar 58'; Ohana 62', 75'; Edri 90+2'	Report		Stadium: Teddy Stadium; Attendance: 0 Referee: Snir Levi

7 November 2020 6	Bnei Yehuda	1–0	Beitar Jerusalem	Tel Aviv
20:30	Zrihan 19'	Report		Stadium: Bloomfield Stadium; Attendance: 0 Referee: Eitan Shemeulevitch

22 November 2020 7	Beitar Jerusalem	1–1	Maccabi Netanya	Jerusalem
20:45	Magbo 37'	Report	Kanichowsky 15'	Stadium: Teddy Stadium; Attendance: 0 Referee: Daniel Bar Natan

25 November 2020 5	Beitar Jerusalem	1–2	Maccabi Petah Tikva	Jerusalem
20:00	Atar 18'	Report	Abada 16'; Hindy 42'	Stadium: Teddy Stadium; Attendance: 0 Referee: Aviad Shiloach

30 November 2020 8	Maccabi Haifa	2–0	Beitar Jerusalem	Haifa
20:45 IST	Rukavytsya 45+1'; Haziza 34'	Report		Stadium: Sammy Ofer Stadium; Attendance: 0 Referee: Liran Liany
Note: Played Behind Closed Doors

7 December 2020 9	Beitar Jerusalem	1–2	Hapoel Be'er Sheva	Jerusalem
20:45 IST	Shua 16'	Report	Josué 65' (pen.), 70'	Stadium: Teddy Stadium; Referee: Eitan Shmuelevich

17 December 2020 3	Beitar Jerusalem	1–0	Ironi Kiryat Shmona	Jerusalem
20:00 IST	Vlijter 35'	Report		Stadium: Teddy Stadium; Referee: Snir Levi

21 December 2021 11	Beitar Jerusalem	0–0	Maccabi Tel Aviv	Jerusalem
20:45 IST		Report		Stadium: Teddy Stadium; Referee: Orel Grinfeeld

24 December 2021 12	Hapoel Kfar Saba	1–1	Beitar Jerusalem	Petah Tikva
20:45 IST	Omoh 38'	Report	Solomon 45' (o.g.)	Stadium: HaMoshava Stadium; Referee: Odeh Na'al

28 December 2021 13	Beitar Jerusalem	1–2	Ashdod	Jerusalem
20:00 IST	Mohamed 24'	Report	David 11'; Bayo 90+3'	Stadium: Teddy Stadium; Referee: Gal Laibuvitz

2 January 2021 14	Beitar Jerusalem	3–3	Hapoel Haifa	Jerusalem
20:00 IST	Adi 49'; Atar 63'; Shua 73'	Report	Stein 44'; Maman 77', 82'	Stadium: Teddy Stadium; Referee: Liran Liany

6 January 2021 15	Hapoel Hadera	0–4	Beitar Jerusalem	Netanya
20:45 IST		Report	Shua 9'; Atar 12', 39', 54'	Stadium: Netanya Stadium; Referee: David Fuxman

23 January 2021 16	Ironi Kiryat Shmona	0–2	Beitar Jerusalem	Kiryat Shmona
18:45 IST		Report	Mohamed 2'; Shua 50'	Stadium: Kiryat Shmona Municipal Stadium; Referee: Erez Papir

26 January 2021 17	Beitar Jerusalem	0–1	Hapoel Tel Aviv	Jerusalem
20:00 IST		Report	Altman	Stadium: Teddy Stadium; Referee: Gil Laibuvitz

11 February 2021 20	Maccabi Netanya	1–2	Beitar Jerusalem	Netanya
20:15 IST	Gouré 77'	Report	Ohana 9'; Vered 61'	Stadium: Netanya Stadium; Referee: Igal Frid

15 February 2021 21	Beitar Jerusalem	0–3	Maccabi Haifa	Jerusalem
20:45 IST		Report	Haziza 17'; Chery 50'; Donyoh 52'	Stadium: Teddy Stadium; Referee: Roi Reinshreiber

18 February 2021 10	Bnei Sakhnin	0–0	Beitar Jerusalem	Sakhnin
20:00 IST		Report		Stadium: Doha Stadium; Referee: Orel Grinfeeld

24 February 2021 18	Maccabi Petah Tikva	0–1	Beitar Jerusalem	Petah Tikva
20:00 IST		Report	Vered 45'	Stadium: HaMoshava Stadium; Referee: Aviad Shiloach

28 February 2021 22	Hapoel Be'er Sheva	1–1	Beitar Jerusalem	Be'er Sheva
20:45 IST	Hatuel 83'	Report	Shua 46'	Stadium: Turner Stadium; Referee: Idan Layba

4 March 2021 23	Beitar Jerusalem	2–3	Bnei Sakhnin	Jerusalem
20:00 IST	Atar 74'; Matheusinho 86'	Report	Kayal 7' (pen.), 30'; Barshazki 59'	Stadium: Teddy Stadium; Referee: Liran Liany

8 March 2021 24	Maccabi Tel Aviv	4–1	Beitar Jerusalem	Tel Aviv
20:45 IST	Shechter 28'; Shua 48' (o.g.); Saborit 53' (pen.); Rikan 76'	Report	Ohana 70'	Stadium: Bloomfield Stadium; Referee: Gil Laibuvitz

11 March 2021 19	Beitar Jerusalem	1–1	Bnei Yehuda	Jerusalem
20:00 IST	Atar 57'	Report	Fochive 74'	Stadium: Teddy Stadium; Referee: Erez Papir

14 March 2021 25	Beitar Jerusalem	2–1	Hapoel Kfar Saba	Jerusalem
20:15 IST	Atar 43' (pen.); Dego 84'	Report	Muzie 6'	Stadium: Teddy Stadium; Referee: Aviad Shiloach

20 March 2021 26	Ashdod	2–0	Beitar Jerusalem	Ashdod
19:15 IST	Safouri 14'; Azulay II 30'	Report		Stadium: Yud Alef Stadium; Referee: Idan Layba

=== Toto Cup ===
==== Group C ====
Pos	Team	Pld	W	D	L	GF	GA	GD	Pts	Qualification or relegation	BEI	BYT	HTA	ASH
1	Beitar Jerusalem	3	1	2	0	2	0	+2	5	Possible Final based on other 1st places	—		0–0	
2	Bnei Yehuda	3	1	1	1	4	5	−1	4	Possible 5–6th match based on other 2nd places	0–0	—		1–5
3	Hapoel Tel Aviv	3	1	1	1	1	3	−2	4	Possible 9–10th match based on other 3rd places		0–3	—	
4	F.C. Ashdod	3	1	0	2	5	4	+1	3	Possible 11–12th match based on other 4th places	2–0		0–1	—

Updated to match(es) played on unknown. Source: Israel Football Association
Rules for classification: 1) points; 2) goal difference; 3) goals for;

8 August 2020 Match 1	Bnei Yehuda	0–0	Beitar Jerusalem	Tel Aviv
20:15		Report		Stadium: Bloomfield Stadium; Attendance: 0 Referee: Igal Frid

11 August 2020 Match 2	Beitar Jerusalem	0–0	Hapoel Tel Aviv	Jerusalem
21:00		Report		Stadium: Teddy Stadium; Attendance: 0 Referee: Idan Layba

16 August 2020 Match 3	Ashdod	0–2	Beitar Jerusalem	Ashdod
19:30		Report	Vered 16'; Rotman 75'	Stadium: Yud-Alef Stadium; Attendance: 0 Referee: Sagi Berman

==== Ranking of first-placed teams ====
Pos	Team	Pld	W	D	L	GF	GA	GD	Pts	Qualification or relegation
1	Bnei Sakhnin	3	2	1	0	4	1	+3	7	Qualified to the Final
2	Maccabi Netanya	3	2	0	1	4	1	+3	6	Qualified to 3–4 classification match
3	Beitar Jerusalem	3	1	2	0	2	0	+2	5	Qualified to 3–4 classification match

Updated to match(es) played on unknown. Source: Israel Football Association
Rules for classification: 1) points; 2) 2019–20 Israeli Premier League;

==== Classification play-offs ====
22 August 2020 3–4th classification match	Maccabi Netanya	0–1	Beitar Jerusalem	Netanya
21:00		Report	Edri 78'	Stadium: Netanya Stadium; Attendance: 0 Referee: Snir Levi

=== UEFA Europa League ===
==== Europa League qualifying phase ====
27 August 2020 First Qualifying Round	Teuta Durrës (Albania)	2–0	(Israel) Beitar Jerusalem	Durrës, Albania
16:30	Krasniqi 6'; Hebaj 87'	Report		Stadium: Niko Dovana Stadium; Attendance: 0 Referee: Nikolas Neokleous (Cyprus)

=== State Cup ===
21 February 2021 Round of 32	Hapoel Acre	0–2	Beitar Jerusalem	Acre
20:00		Report	Shua 44' (pen.), 45'	Stadium: Acre Municipal Stadium; Referee: Dror Bar Natan

17 March 2021 Round of 16	Beitar Jerusalem	1–2 (a.e.t.)	F.C. Ashdod	Jerusalem
18:00	Shua 41'	Report	Gordana 22' (pen.); Ocampos 93' (o.g.)	Stadium: Teddy Stadium; Attendance: 1,500; Referee: Liran Liany
