= 1985–86 Liga Leumit =

Liga Leumit
- Season: 1985–86
- Champions: Hapoel Tel Aviv; 9th title
- Relegated: Hapoel Haifa; Hapoel Jerusalem; Maccabi Sha'arayim
- Top goalscorer: Uri Malmilian; Doron Rabinzon (18)

In the 1985–86 Liga Leumit season Hapoel Tel Aviv won the title. Hapoel Haifa, Hapoel Jerusalem and Maccabi Sha'arayim were all relegated to Liga Artzit. Uri Malmilian of Beitar Jerusalem and Doron Rabinzon of Maccabi Petah Tikva were the league's joint top scorers with 14 goals.

The league championship was decided on the final day, with a match between the two title chasers, Maccabi Haifa and Hapoel Tel Aviv. Hapoel Tel Aviv, who needed a win to secure the championship, scored a controversial goal in the 86th minute to win 1–0 and the title.

== Final table ==
Pos	Team	Pld	W	D	L	GF	GA	GD	Pts	Qualification or relegation
1	Hapoel Tel Aviv (C)	30	17	8	5	52	26	+26	59	Qualification for the Intertoto Cup
2	Maccabi Haifa	30	16	9	5	47	18	+29	57	Qualification for the Intertoto Cup
3	Maccabi Tel Aviv	30	16	9	5	48	27	+21	57	
4	Beitar Jerusalem	30	15	7	8	48	33	+15	52	
5	Bnei Yehuda Tel Aviv	30	12	10	8	27	19	+8	46	
6	Hapoel Kfar Saba	30	11	9	10	41	34	+7	42	
7	Maccabi Petah Tikva	30	11	7	12	34	41	−7	40	
8	Hapoel Be'er Sheva	30	10	9	11	24	24	0	39	
9	Maccabi Netanya	30	11	6	13	34	35	−1	39	
10	Shimshon Tel Aviv	30	9	11	10	32	38	−6	38	
11	Maccabi Yavne	30	9	10	11	21	32	−11	37	
12	Maccabi Jaffa	30	9	9	12	24	34	−10	36	
13	Hapoel Petah Tikva	30	9	8	13	42	44	−2	35	
14	Hapoel Jerusalem (R)	30	8	6	16	31	45	−14	30	Relegated to Liga Artzit
15	Hapoel Haifa (R)	30	6	6	18	24	60	−36	24	Relegated to Liga Artzit
16	Maccabi Sha'arayim (R)	30	4	10	16	22	41	−19	22	Relegated to Liga Artzit

(C) Champions; (R) Relegated

== Results ==
Home \ Away	BEI	BnY	HBS	HHA	HJE	HKS	HPT	HTA	MHA	MJA	MNE	MPT	MSH	MTA	MYV	STA
Beitar Jerusalem	—	1–0	1–1	3–1	1–0	2–1	3–1	2–3	2–1	2–0	1–2	0–0	5–2	0–1	4–0	1–1
Bnei Yehuda	1–1	—	1–0	5–0	1–0	1–2	0–2	2–2	1–0	0–0	1–0	4–1	0–0	0–0	2–1	0–0
Hapoel Be'er Sheva	1–0	0–0	—	3–0	1–0	3–1	2–1	1–2	1–2	0–0	0–0	0–1	1–0	0–0	1–1	1–1
Hapoel Haifa	2–6	0–0	0–2	—	2–1	0–1	1–0	0–0	0–2	1–1	1–2	1–0	2–1	0–2	1–0	1–3
Hapoel Jerusalem	0–2	2–1	1–0	2–1	—	1–1	3–1	2–2	3–2	0–0	2–1	1–2	2–0	1–3	0–1	2–2
Hapoel Kfar Saba	4–0	0–1	0–0	4–0	1–1	—	2–0	2–1	2–3	3–2	1–1	3–0	1–0	1–0	0–0	1–2
Hapoel Petah Tikva	0–0	2–3	1–0	3–1	4–2	1–1	—	0–2	0–0	4–2	2–0	1–1	0–2	3–1	5–0	1–1
Hapoel Tel Aviv	0–1	2–0	0–1	3–1	1–0	2–1	1–1	—	1–0	3–1	5–1	5–1	3–2	0–0	3–0	2–1
Maccabi Haifa	1–1	0–0	5–1	4–0	3–0	4–1	1–0	1–1	—	1–1	1–0	0–0	0–0	3–1	1–0	4–0
Maccabi Jaffa	0–2	0–1	0–2	1–1	0–2	1–0	1–0	1–0	0–1	—	1–0	2–0	1–0	1–2	1–1	2–1
Maccabi Netanya	1–2	1–0	0–1	4–0	2–0	1–0	2–2	1–3	0–0	1–0	—	1–1	1–1	0–2	2–1	1–0
Maccabi Petah Tikva	2–0	0–1	1–0	1–3	2–0	1–1	3–2	1–0	0–1	4–1	0–3	—	4–0	4–4	0–0	1–0
Maccabi Sha'arayim	1–2	1–0	1–1	1–1	1–1	1–1	0–1	0–1	0–0	0–1	2–1	1–2	—	1–2	2–1	1–1
Maccabi Tel Aviv	3–1	0–1	1–0	1–1	4–1	2–0	6–3	1–1	1–0	1–1	3–2	3–0	2–0	—	1–1	1–0
Maccabi Yavne	1–1	0–0	2–0	2–1	1–0	0–2	2–0	1–1	0–2	0–1	1–0	1–0	1–1	1–0	—	1–0
Shimshon Tel Aviv	2–1	1–0	1–0	2–1	2–1	3–3	1–1	0–2	1–4	1–1	1–3	2–1	2–0	0–0	0–0	—

Legend: Blue = home team win; Yellow = draw; Red = away team win.

== Final match ==
Hapoel Tel Aviv 1–0 Maccabi Haifa
- Event: 1985–86 Liga Leumit
Hapoel Tel Aviv	Maccabi Haifa
1	0
- Date: 24 May 1986
- Venue: Bloomfield Stadium, Tel Aviv
- Referee: Zvi Sharrir
- Attendance: 13,993
- Weather: Sunny

On 24 May 1986, Hapoel Tel Aviv came face-to-face with Maccabi Haifa in a Liga Leumit fixture at Bloomfield Stadium, during the final rounds of the 1985–86 season. That match was the season's deciding match. Maccabi Haifa led by one point prior to the match. Hapoel Tel Aviv won with one goal scored at the 86th minute by striker, Gili Landau, winning the match and the championship.

== Background ==
At the beginning of the 1985–86 season, 16 football (soccer) clubs competed in the Liga Leumit, which was the top division at that time in Israel. Maccabi Haifa, which won the two previous league championships took early charge of the league, leading by five points at the 9th round. However, a rather poor string of results saw Hapoel Tel Aviv overtake Maccabi Haifa, taking a five-point lead at the top at the 19th round. At the 24th round, Maccabi Haifa was back on top, with 46 points and a two-point lead over Hapoel Tel Aviv, with Maccabi Tel Aviv also in the running, just points away. After the 29th round, with one match left to play, Maccabi Haifa led the table with 57 points. Hapoel Tel Aviv was second with 56 points. The two teams were to meet in the last round for a match that would decide the championship.

== Pre-match ==
Pos	Team	Pld	W	D	L	GF	GA	GD	Pts
1	Maccabi Haifa	29	16	9	4	47	17	+30	57
2	Hapoel Tel Aviv	29	16	8	5	51	26	+25	56
3	Maccabi Tel Aviv	29	15	9	5	42	24	+18	54
4	Beitar Jerusalem	29	14	7	8	43	31	+12	49
5	Bnei Yehuda	29	12	10	7	26	17	+9	46

Updated to match(es) played on 17 May 1986. Source: Ma'ariv, 18 May 1986, p. 27 (in Hebrew)

As Maccabi Haifa was leading by a point, a draw would be enough towards claiming their third straight championship, while Hapoel Tel Aviv needed to win their tenth championship. Due to the importance of the match, the IBA decided to broadcast the match live, the first ever live broadcast of a league match in Israel.

== Match ==
With 20,000 fans in the stands, Maccabi Haifa sought to stall the match to force a 0–0 draw, which would allow them to win the championship. The first shot on goal was made by Zahi Armeli of Maccabi Haifa at the 24th minute, while Moris Zano of Hapoel registered their first shot at the 32nd minute. Early in the second half, Hapoel manager David Schweitzer substituted midfielders Jacob Cohen and Elior Baranes with strikers Gili Landau and Eli Yani, and Hapoel increased their attacks. At the 86th minute, Eli Cohen passed the ball to Moshe Sinai in midfield. Sinai lobbed the ball over the Maccabi Haifa defense towards the rushing Landau, while at the far left side of the defense, Eli Yani was running back from an offside position. Referee Zvi Sharir allowed the play to continue and Landau struck the ball over the Maccabi Haifa goalkeeper Avi Ran to break the deadlock. Eli Cohen was sent off for a tackle made on Rafi Osmo, but the score did not change. Hapoel Tel Aviv won the championship with a two-point lead.

=== Details ===
24 May 1986
17:00

Hapoel Tel Aviv	1–0	Maccabi Haifa
Landau 86'

Bloomfield Stadium, Tel Aviv
Attendance: 20,000
Referee: Zvi Sharir

Hapoel Tel Aviv
Maccabi Haifa

GK
LB
CB
CB
RB
LM
CM
CM
RM
CF
CF
Substitutes:
CF
CF
Manager:
(Israel) David Schweitzer

(Israel) Yom Tov Talias
(Israel) Yehuda Amar
(Israel) Ya'akov Ekhoiz
(Israel) Yossi Zana
(Israel) David Herschlikovitz
(Israel) Jacob Cohen	(substituted off) 54'
(Israel) Eli Cohen	90
(Israel) Elior Baranes	Substituted off
(Israel) Moshe Sinai
(Israel) Morris Zano
(Israel) Shabtai Levy
(Israel) Gili Landau	(substituted in) 54'
(Israel) Eli Yani	Substituted in

GK	(Israel) Avi Ran
LB	(Israel) Eitan Aharoni
CB	(Israel) Rafi Osmo
CB	(Israel) Eli Cohen
RB	(Israel) Zion Merili
CM	(Israel) Lior Rosenthal
CM	(Israel) Avraham Abukarat
CM	(Israel) Baruch Maman
CF	(Israel) Zahi Armeli
CF	(Israel) Moshe Selecter	Substituted off
CF	(Israel) Ronny Rosenthal
Substitutes:
CM	(Israel) Nir Klinger	Substituted in
Manager:
(Israel) Shlomo Scharf

== Post-match ==
While Hapoel Tel Aviv celebrated their championship, Maccabi Haifa sounded claims against the validity of the winning goal, pointing to Eli Yani's offside position during the final pass. Referee Zvi Sharir defended his decision, stating that Eli Yani was in a "passive offside".
