= Jerusalem derby =

Football rivalry in Jerusalem, Israel

Jerusalem Derby
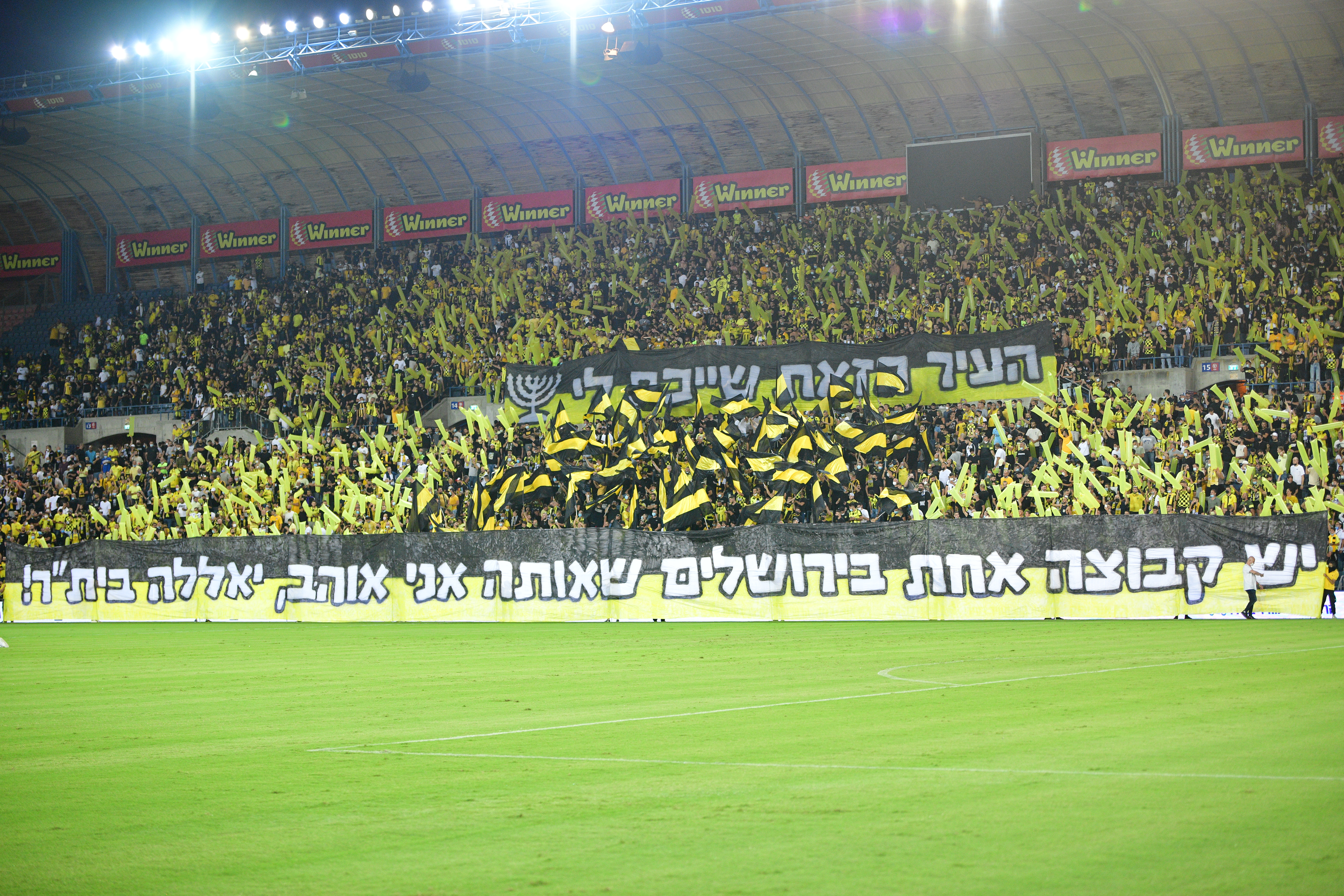
- Jerusalem derby, September 2021
- Location: (Israel) Jerusalem
- Teams: Beitar Jerusalem; Hapoel Jerusalem
- First meeting: 15 November 1947
- Stadiums: Teddy Stadium, Jerusalem

Statistics
- Total meetings: 60
- Most wins: Beitar Jerusalem (27)
- All-time series (Israeli Premier League only): Beitar Jerusalem: 27; Draw: 22; Hapoel Jerusalem: 14

The Jerusalem derby (Hebrew: הדרבי של ירושלים) refers to football matches between Jerusalem-based teams Beitar Jerusalem and Hapoel Jerusalem. The teams have met on 70 separate occasions, 58 of which were in the league, 6 in the State Cup, two in the Toto Cup and one Exhibition game in 1969 that Hapoel won. Beitar Jerusalem has been the more dominant side in the derby, with 32 wins, while Hapoel Jerusalem won 16 times.

Both clubs play in Teddy Stadium, a stadium ironically named after Jerusalem's left leaning mayor at the time Teddy Kollek.

The derby, which was formerly more popular, lost some of its relevance as Hapoel Jerusalem were relegated to the second division in the 1999–2000 Israeli Premier League, which would be the last time both teams met for the next 2 decades.

Due to this, the rivalry between Beitar and Hapoel Tel Aviv has become more fierce.

Hapoel Jerusalem finished second place in the 2020–21 Liga Leumit and were promoted to the 2021–22 Israeli Premier League, where they will play Beitar Jerusalem in the derby once again, with the first match between them scheduled to be played in the 2021–22 Toto Cup Al.

Historically, Hapoel were the superior side before the 1970s, however since the 1970s, Beitar has won several honors including six Israeli football championships and eight state cups.
