= Matheusinho =

Brazilian footballer (born 1998)

Personal information
- Full name: Matheus Leonardo Sales Cardoso
- Date of birth: 11 February 1998 (age 28)
- Place of birth: Belo Horizonte, Brazil
- Height: 1.64 m (5 ft 4 1/2 in)
- Positions: Attacking midfielder; winger

Team information
- Current team: Atlético Goianiense

Youth career
- 2011–2016: América Mineiro

Senior career*
Years	Team	Apps	(Gls)
2016–2020	América Mineiro	126	(15)
2020–2022	Beitar Jerusalem	14	(2)
2021–2022	→ FC Ashdod (loan)	14	(1)
2022–2024	América Mineiro	58	(5)
2024–2025	Criciúma	28	(5)
2025–2026	Santa Clara	9	(0)
2025	→ Sport Recife (loan)	25	(2)
2026	→ Ceará (loan)	16	(1)
2026–	Atlético Goianiense	0	(0)

International career
2015	Brazil U17	3	(0)
2016–2017	Brazil U20	2	(0)
- * Club domestic league appearances and goals as of 4 July 2026

Matheus Leonardo Sales Cardoso (born 11 February 1998), commonly known as Matheusinho, is a Brazilian professional footballer who plays as an attacking midfielder or winger for Série B club Atlético Goianiense.

== Club career ==
Born in Belo Horizonte, Minas Gerais, Matheusinho joined América Mineiro's youth setup in 2011, aged 13. In 2016, he was promoted to the main squad by manager Givanildo Oliveira.

Matheusinho made his first team debut on 19 March 2016, coming on as a second-half substitute for Tiago Luís in a 0–2 Campeonato Mineiro away loss against Tombense. He appeared in two further matches during the tournament, as his side was crowned champions.

Matheusinho made his Série A debut on 2 June 2016, replacing Alan Mineiro in a 1–2 home loss against Ponte Preta. On 30 September, after already becoming a starter under new manager Enderson Moreira, he renewed his contract until 2021. On 18 September 2020 he was transferred and signed a 5 year contract with Beitar Jerusalem for an undisclosed fee.

== Career statistics ==
As of 3 May 2025

Club	Season	League			State league		Cup		Continental		Other		Total	
Club	Season	Division	Apps	Goals	Apps	Goals	Apps	Goals	Apps	Goals	Apps	Goals	Apps	Goals
América Mineiro	2016	Série A	18	0	3	0	2	0	—		0	0	23	0
América Mineiro	2017	Série B	24	2	5	1	0	0	—		2 (Note: Appearance(s) in Primeira Liga)	0	31	3
América Mineiro	2018	Série A	17	2	0	0	0	0	—		—		12	1
América Mineiro	2019	Série B	31	6	12	3	2	0	—		—		45	9
América Mineiro	2020	Série B	9	1	7	0	1	0	—		—		17	1
América Mineiro	Total		99	11	27	4	5	0	—		2	0	133	15
Beitar Jerusalem	2020–21	Israeli Premier League	13	2	—		2	0	—		—		15	2
Beitar Jerusalem	2021–22	Israeli Premier League	1	0	—		0	0	—		2 (Note: Appearance(s) in Toto Cup Al)	0	3	0
Beitar Jerusalem	Total		14	2	—		2	0	—		2	0	18	2
F.C. Ashdod (loan)	2021–22	Israeli Premier League	14	1	—		1	0	—		—		15	1
América Mineiro	2022	Série A	28	2	7	0	5	1	6 (Note: Appearance(s) in Copa Libertadores)	0	—		46	3
América Mineiro	2023	Série A	7	0	12	2	4	0	7	2	—		23	2
América Mineiro	2024	Série A	0	0	4	1	0	0	0	0	—		4	1
América Mineiro	Total		35	2	23	3	9	1	13	2	—		80	8
Criciúma	2024	Série A	28	5	—		2	0	—		—		30	5
Santa Clara	2024–25	Primeira Liga	7	0	—		—		—		—		7	0
Career total			197	21	50	7	19	1	13	2	4	0	283	31

== Honours ==
América Mineiro

- Campeonato Mineiro: 2016
- Campeonato Brasileiro Série B: 2017
