= Moshe Sinai =

Israeli footballer (born 1961)

Personal information
- Date of birth: 22 February 1961 (age 65)
- Place of birth: Jaffa, Tel Aviv, Israel
- Position: Midfielder

Team information
- Current team: Hapoel Tel Aviv (Director of football)

Senior career*
Years	Team	Apps	(Gls)
1978–1980	Maccabi Jaffa	23	(1)
1980–1987	Hapoel Tel Aviv	174	(52)
1987	Beveren	7	(0)
1987–1989	Hapoel Tel Aviv	52	(21)
1989–1990	Bnei Yehuda	32	(14)
1990–1993	Hapoel Tel Aviv	64	(14)
Total		352	(102)

International career
1981–1990	Israel	44	(7)

Managerial career
- 1993–1997: Hapoel Tel Aviv
- 1997–1998: Maccabi Petah Tikva
- 2000–2004: Israel U21
- 2006–2010: Israel (assistant)
- 2010–2011: Maccabi Herzliya
- 2012–2013: Maccabi Petah Tikva
- 2017: Maccabi Herzliya
- * Club domestic league appearances and goals

Moshe Sinai (Hebrew: משה סיני; born 22 February 1961) is an Israeli former professional footballer who works as the director of football for Hapoel Tel Aviv.

He had a trial with Manchester United in 1985.

== Honours ==
Hapoel Tel Aviv

- Liga Leumit: 1980–81, 1985–86, 1987–88
- Israel State Cup: 1982–83

Bnei Yehuda

- Liga Leumit: 1989–90

Individual

- Footballer of the Year - Israel: 1981, 1990
