= Eitan Tayeb =

Israeli footballer and manager

Eitan Tayeb איתן טייב
Personal information
- Full name: Eitan Tayeb
- Date of birth: April 4, 1971 (age 55)
- Place of birth: Beit She'an, Israel
- Position: Center back

Youth career
- Hapoel Beit She'an

Senior career*
Years	Team	Apps	(Gls)
1989–1991	Hapoel Beit She'an		
1991–1993	Maccabi Haifa		
1993–1994	Hapoel Beit She'an		
1994–1995	Maccabi Netanya	15	(0)
1995–2000	Hapoel Beit She'an	103	(13)
2000–2001	Maccabi Ahi Nazareth		

Managerial career
- 2011–2014: Hapoel Beit She'an
- 2014–2015: Hapoel Migdal HaEmek
- * Club domestic league appearances and goals

Eitan Tayeb (Hebrew: איתן טייב) is an Israeli former footballer who played for Hapoel Beit She'an F.C. Tayeb now works as a manager.

He is of a Tunisian-Jewish descent.
