= Ya'akov Ekhoiz =

Israeli footballer

Personal information
- Full name: Ya'akov Ekhoiz
- Date of birth: May 29, 1957 (age 69)
- Place of birth: Ramat HaSharon, Israel
- Position: Defender

Youth career
- 1970–1974: Hapoel Tel Aviv

Senior career*
| Years | Team | Apps | (Gls) |
| 1974–1992 | Hapoel Tel Aviv | 484 | (12) |

International career
| 1980–1986 | Israel | 29 | (0) |
- * Club domestic league appearances and goals

Ya'akov Ekhoiz (Hebrew: יעקב אקהויז; born 29 May 1957) is an Israeli former footballer.

== Biography ==
Ekhoiz joined Hapoel Tel Aviv youth team, after impressing in the national schoolboys championship, and graduated to the senior squad during the 1974–75 season. Ekhoiz stayed with the club until retiring in 1992, playing 484 matches and scoring 12 goals for the club. Ekhoiz scored one of the club's goals in the 1983 cup final.

On 18 June 1980 Ekhoiz played his debut match for the national team in a 1982 FIFA World Cup qualification (UEFA Group 6) match against Sweden, coming as a substitute to Rifaat Turk in the first half, setting up the header which led to the Israeli goal in the match and missing a match winning opportunity in the 88th minute. Ekhoiz played 28 more matches for the national team, making his final appearance in a 2–7 defeat to Argentina on 4 May 1986.

After retiring, Ekhoiz coached youth teams with Hapoel Tel Aviv and Hapoel Rishon LeZion

== Honours ==
- Championships: 3
  - 1980–81, 1985–86, 1987–88
- Cups: 1
  - 1982–83
- Super Cup: 1
  - 1981
