= Yossi Zana =

Israeli footballer

Yossi Zana יוסי זאנה
Personal information
- Full name: Yoseph "Yossi" Zana יוסף "יוסי" זאנה
- Date of birth: 15 July 1957 (age 69)
- Place of birth: Hadera, Israel
- Position: Defender

Youth career
- Maccabi Netanya

Senior career*
Years	Team	Apps	(Gls)
1975–1978	Maccabi Netanya		
1978–1979	Beitar Jerusalem		
1979–1989	Hapoel Tel Aviv		
1989–1992	Bnei Yehuda	53	(3)
- Maccabi Yavne

International career
1983–1989	Israel	3	(0)
- * Club domestic league appearances and goals

Yoseph "Yossi" Zana (Hebrew: יוסף "יוסי" זאנה; born 15 July 1957) is a former Israeli professional association football player and former international.

== Biography ==
=== Playing career ===
==== International ====
Zana made his full national team debut on 20 November 1983 in a match against West Germany at Bloomfield Stadium.

=== Personal life ===
Zana was born to a Tunisian-Jewish family. He is married to Aliza and was last known to be working for the Israel Electric Corporation.

== Honours ==
- With Maccabi Netanya:
  - Liga Leumit (1): 1977/78
- With Beitar Jerusalem:
  - Israel State Cup (1): 1978/79
- With Hapoel Tel Aviv:
  - Liga Leumit (3): 1980/81, 1985/86, 1987/88
  - Israel State Cup (1): 1982/83
  - UEFA Intertoto Cup group 8 winner (1): 1978
- With Bnei Yehuda Tel Aviv:
  - Liga Leumit (1): 1989/90
