= Rafi Osmo =

Israeli footballer

Rafi Osmo רפי אוסמו
Personal information
- Full name: Rafi Osmo
- Date of birth: 25 March 1963 (age 63)
- Place of birth: Nesher, Israel
- Positions: Centre back; defensive midfielder

Youth career
- Maccabi Haifa

Senior career*
Years	Team	Apps	(Gls)
1980–1992	Maccabi Haifa	181	(3)
1987–1990	→ Hapoel Haifa		
1991–1992	→ Hapoel Haifa		

International career
1986	Israel	2	(0)
- * Club domestic league appearances and goals

Rafi Osmo (Hebrew: רפי אוסמו; born 25 March 1963) is a former Israeli footballer. Between 2016 and 2020 he was the chairman of Maccabi Haifa, where he played most of his career.

== Honours ==
- Israeli Championships
  - 1983–84, 1984–85, 1990–91
