= Gabi Lasri =

Israeli footballer

Gabi Lasri גבי לסרי
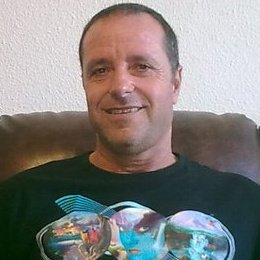

Personal information
- Full name: Gabi Lasri
- Date of birth: October 5, 1956 (age 70)
- Place of birth: Jaffa, Tel Aviv, Israel

Youth career
- Hapoel Tel Aviv

Senior career*
Years	Team	Apps	(Gls)
1975–1982	Hapoel Tel Aviv		
1982–1983	Maccabi Tel Aviv		
1983–1984	Maccabi Netanya		
1984–1986	Hapoel Tel Aviv		
1986–1987	Hapoel Petah Tikva		
1987–1990	Hapoel Tiberias		

International career
1983–1985	Israel	14	(0)
- * Club domestic league appearances and goals

Gabi Lasri (Hebrew: גבי לסרי; born October 5, 1956) is former Israeli footballer known as the first one to move from Hapoel Tel Aviv to Maccabi Tel Aviv.
