= Moshe Selecter =

Israeli footballer

Moshe Selecter משה סלקטר
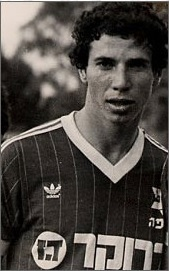

Personal information
- Full name: Moshe Selecter
- Date of birth: 3 December 1961 (age 64)
- Place of birth: Haifa, Israel
- Height: 1.75 m (5 ft 9 in)
- Position: Forward

Youth career
- 1970–1979: Maccabi Haifa

Senior career*
Years	Team	Apps	(Gls)
1979–1987	Maccabi Haifa	201	(56)
1987–1988	Beitar Jerusalem	20	(4)
1988	→ Hapoel Kfar Saba (loan)	18	(1)
1989	Maccabi Haifa	3	(0)
1990–1991	Maccabi Acre	43	(9)

International career
1983–1985	Israel	7	(1)

Managerial career
- 1991: Maccabi Haifa (youth)
- * Club domestic league appearances and goals

Moshe Selecter (Hebrew: משה סלקטר) is an Israeli former footballer who played in Maccabi Haifa.

== Honours ==
=== Player ===
==== Club ====
Maccabi Haifa

- Israeli Premier League: 1983–84, 1984–85

Maccabi Acre

- Liga Alef: 1989-90

=== Individual ===
- Footballer of the Year – Israel: 1984-85
