= 1989–90 Liga Leumit =

Liga Leumit
- Season: 1989–90
- Champions: Bnei Yehuda; 1st title
- Relegated: Hapoel Ramat Gan; Shimshon Tel Aviv
- Top goalscorer: Uri Malmilian (16)

The 1989–90 Liga Leumit season saw Bnei Yehuda won their first, and to date only title, whilst Hapoel Ramat Gan and Shimshon Tel Aviv were relegated to Liga Artzit. Uri Malmilian of Maccabi Tel Aviv was the league's top scorer with 16 goals.

After the first two rounds of matches (22 matches) the league split into two groups of six clubs; a Championship group and a Relegation group, with clubs playing the others in their group twice more.

== Regular season ==
=== Table ===
Pos	Team	Pld	W	D	L	GF	GA	GD	Pts	Qualification
1	Bnei Yehuda	22	10	9	3	31	18	+13	39	Qualification for the championship round
2	Maccabi Haifa	22	10	6	6	27	16	+11	36	Qualification for the championship round
3	Hapoel Petah Tikva	22	9	8	5	20	14	+6	35	Qualification for the championship round
4	Beitar Tel Aviv	22	9	7	6	27	26	+1	34	Qualification for the championship round
5	Hapoel Kfar Saba	22	9	5	8	25	21	+4	32	Qualification for the championship round
6	Maccabi Tel Aviv	22	8	6	8	26	27	−1	30	Qualification for the championship round
7	Maccabi Netanya	22	7	7	8	20	20	0	28	Qualification for the relegation round
8	Hapoel Jerusalem	22	6	7	9	18	26	−8	25	Qualification for the relegation round
9	Hapoel Be'er Sheva	22	5	9	8	22	28	−6	24	Qualification for the relegation round
10	Shimshon Tel Aviv	22	5	9	8	19	25	−6	24	Qualification for the relegation round
11	Beitar Jerusalem	22	7	3	12	13	19	−6	24	Qualification for the relegation round
12	Hapoel Ramat Gan	22	5	8	9	16	24	−8	23	Qualification for the relegation round

Source: EU-Football.info

=== Results ===
Home \ Away	BEI	BTA	BnY	HBS	HJE	HKS	HPT	HRG	MHA	MNE	MTA	STA
Beitar Jerusalem	—	1–0	0–1	1–0	2–0	1–2	1–0	0–0	0–1	1–0	1–0	1–1
Beitar Tel Aviv	1–0	—	0–0	1–1	1–0	2–1	1–0	0–1	0–0	2–1	3–3	3–1
Bnei Yehuda	1–1	2–2	—	1–1	2–0	2–1	1–1	4–0	1–1	2–1	3–1	1–1
Hapoel Be'er Sheva	1–0	3–0	2–0	—	1–1	1–0	1–0	1–1	0–0	0–0	2–2	1–2
Hapoel Jerusalem	1–0	1–2	0–1	1–1	—	2–1	0–0	0–0	0–4	1–1	2–0	3–1
Hapoel Kfar Saba	1–0	1–0	2–2	3–0	1–1	—	1–2	0–2	3–1	1–0	2–0	0–0
Hapoel Petah Tikva	1–0	2–0	1–1	2–0	2–0	1–0	—	0–0	2–1	1–1	0–1	0–0
Hapoel Ramat Gan	2–0	2–3	2–1	2–2	0–1	0–1	3–0	—	1–3	0–1	0–0	0–0
Maccabi Haifa	2–0	0–1	1–0	3–1	3–1	0–0	0–2	2–0	—	0–2	3–0	1–0
Maccabi Netanya	3–1	1–1	0–1	3–2	1–0	0–2	0–0	2–0	0–0	—	1–1	1–0
Maccabi Tel Aviv	1–0	3–3	0–2	3–0	2–2	2–0	0–1	3–0	1–0	2–0	—	0–2
Shimshon Tel Aviv	0–2	2–1	0–2	2–1	0–1	2–2	2–2	0–0	1–1	2–1	0–1	—

Legend: Blue = home team win; Yellow = draw; Red = away team win.

== Playoffs ==
=== Top playoff ===
==== Table ====
Pos	Team	Pld	W	D	L	GF	GA	GD	Pts	Qualification
1	Bnei Yehuda (C)	32	17	11	4	48	24	+24	62	Qualification for the Intertoto Cup
2	Hapoel Petah Tikva	32	16	10	6	40	21	+19	58	
3	Maccabi Haifa	32	14	8	10	40	29	+11	50	Qualification for the Intertoto Cup
4	Maccabi Tel Aviv	32	14	6	12	48	44	+4	48	
5	Beitar Tel Aviv	32	10	8	14	35	46	−11	38	
6	Hapoel Kfar Saba	32	10	6	16	28	41	−13	36	

Source: rsssf.com
(C) Champions

==== Results ====
Home \ Away	BTA	BnY	HKS	HPT	MHA	MTA
Beitar Tel Aviv	—	0–3	0–0	1–3	1–0	2–3
Bnei Yehuda	1–0	—	1–0	0–0	3–0	4–3
Hapoel Kfar Saba	2–1	0–2	—	0–3	0–2	0–3
Hapoel Petah Tikva	3–1	0–1	2–0	—	2–1	2–1
Maccabi Haifa	3–1	2–2	1–0	1–1	—	3–1
Maccabi Tel Aviv	2–1	1–0	5–1	1–4	2–0	—

Legend: Blue = home team win; Yellow = draw; Red = away team win.

=== Bottom playoff ===
==== Table ====
Pos	Team	Pld	W	D	L	GF	GA	GD	Pts	Relegation
7	Maccabi Netanya	32	9	12	11	31	31	0	39	
8	Hapoel Jerusalem	32	9	12	11	29	35	−6	39	
9	Hapoel Be'er Sheva	32	8	14	10	29	33	−4	38	
10	Beitar Jerusalem	32	10	8	14	20	25	−5	38	
11	Hapoel Ramat Gan (R)	32	8	12	12	24	34	−10	36	Relegated to Liga Artzit
12	Shimshon Tel Aviv (R)	32	7	13	12	23	32	−9	34	Relegated to Liga Artzit

Source: rsssf.com
(R) Relegated

==== Results ====
Home \ Away	BEI	HBS	HJE	HRG	MNE	STA
Beitar Jerusalem	—	0–1	1–1	0–1	0–0	1–0
Hapoel Be'er Sheva	0–1	—	1–0	3–0	1–1	0–0
Hapoel Jerusalem	1–1	2–0	—	1–1	1–1	1–0
Hapoel Ramat Gan	0–0	0–0	2–3	—	1–0	1–1
Maccabi Netanya	2–3	1–1	1–1	2–1	—	3–0
Shimshon Tel Aviv	0–0	0–0	1–0	0–1	2–0	—

Legend: Blue = home team win; Yellow = draw; Red = away team win.
