= Gili Landau =

Israeli footballer and manager

Gili Landau גילי לנדאו
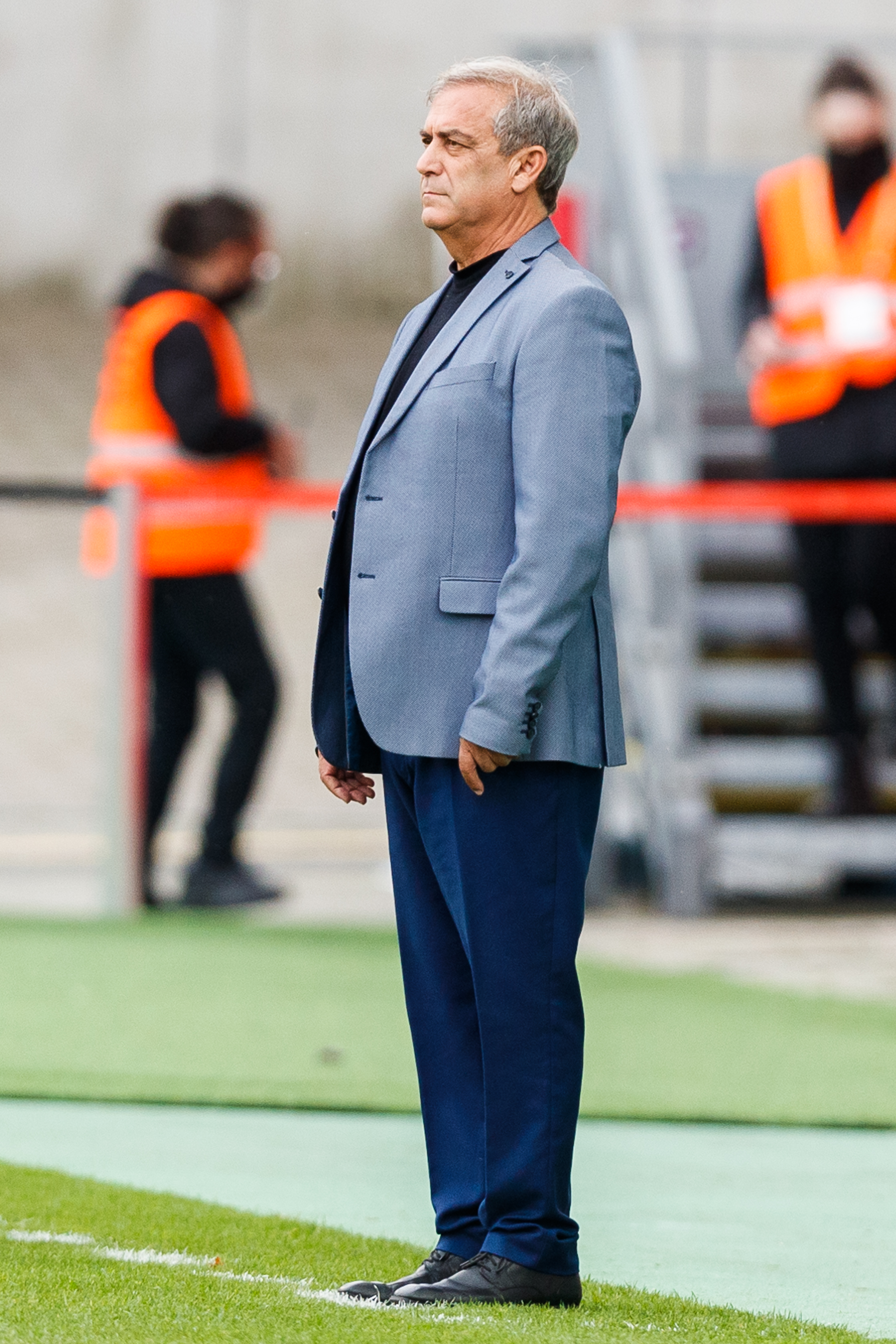

Personal information
- Full name: Gili Landau
- Date of birth: May 7, 1958 (age 68)
- Place of birth: Bat Yam, Israel
- Position: Striker

Team information
- Current team: Israel (women)

Youth career
- Hapoel Tel Aviv

Senior career*
Years	Team	Apps	(Gls)
1975–1990	Hapoel Tel Aviv	298	(43)

International career
1983–1984	Israel	6	(0)

Managerial career
- 1991–1995: Hapoel Bat Yam
- 1995–1996: Maccabi Herlzliya
- 1998–1999: Hapoel Be'er Sheva
- 1999–2000: Hakoah Ramat Gan
- 2000–2002: Maccabi Kiryat Gat
- 2002–2004: Maccabi Netanya
- 2004: Hapoel Tel Aviv
- 2006–2008: Hapoel Be'er Sheva
- 2008: Hapoel Bnei Lod
- 2011–2012: Hapoel Petah Tikva
- 2012: Ironi Kiryat Shmona
- 2016: F.C. Ashdod (sport director)
- 2018–2019: Agudat Sport Ashdod
- 2021–: Israel women
- * Club domestic league appearances and goals

Gili Landau
Medal record

Representing Israel

Football

Maccabiah Games
Gold medal – first place	1977 Maccabiah	Football

Gili Landau (Hebrew: גילי לנדאו; born 7 May 1958) is an Israeli former footballer and currently a manager, coaching the Israel women's national football team.

== Biography ==
Gili Landau was born in Bat Yam, Israel.

He played soccer as a striker for Hapoel Tel Aviv for 17 years, from 1974–90, 12 matches for the Israel national football team, and earned a gold medal playing for Team Israel at the 1977 Maccabiah Games. He won three national championships, and one national cup.

== Managerial career ==
Landau has coached Hapoel Bat Yam, Maccabi Herlzliya, Hapoel Be'er Sheva, Hakoah Ramat Gan, Maccabi Kiryat Gat, Maccabi Netanya, Hapoel Tel Aviv, Hapoel Bnei Lod, Hapoel Petah Tikva, Ironi Kiryat Shmona, F.C. Ashdod (sport director), and Agudat Sport Ashdod.

He was appointed coach of the Israel women's national football team in July 2021.

== Honours ==
As player

- Israeli Premier League (3):
  - 1980-81, 1985–86, 1987–88
- Israel State Cup (1):
  - 1983
