= 1980–81 Liga Leumit =

Liga Leumit
- Season: 1980–81
- Champions: Hapoel Tel Aviv; 8th title
- Relegated: Hapoel Haifa; Maccabi Ramat Amidar; Hapoel Ramat Gan
- Top goalscorer: Herzl Fitusi (22)

The 1980–81 Liga Leumit season saw Hapoel Tel Aviv win the title, and Hapoel Haifa, Maccabi Ramat Amidar, Hapoel Ramat Gan were relegated. Herzl Fitusi of Maccabi Petah Tikva was the league's top scorer with 22 goals.

== Final table ==
Pos	Team	Pld	W	D	L	GF	GA	GD	Pts	Qualification or relegation
1	Hapoel Tel Aviv (C)	30	13	12	5	50	30	+20	38	Qualification for the Intertoto Cup
2	Bnei Yehuda	30	11	13	6	38	27	+11	35	
3	Maccabi Jaffa	30	12	10	8	43	35	+8	34	
4	Maccabi Petah Tikva	30	12	9	9	49	39	+10	33	
5	Shimshon Tel Aviv	30	11	11	8	32	26	+6	33	
6	Hapoel Rishon LeZion	30	9	14	7	25	18	+7	32	
7	Hapoel Yehud	30	9	14	7	24	18	+6	32	
8	Maccabi Tel Aviv	30	10	12	8	33	33	0	32	
9	Hapoel Jerusalem	30	9	13	8	30	25	+5	31	
10	Maccabi Netanya	30	9	12	9	31	30	+1	30	Qualification for the Intertoto Cup
11	Hapoel Be'er Sheva	30	9	12	9	30	32	−2	30	
12	Hapoel Petah Tikva	30	7	15	8	25	29	−4	29	
13	Hapoel Kfar Saba	30	9	10	11	34	36	−2	28	
14	Hapoel Haifa (R)	30	8	10	12	30	44	−14	26	Relegated to Liga Artzit
15	Maccabi Ramat Amidar (R)	30	7	11	12	21	30	−9	25	Relegated to Liga Artzit
16	Hapoel Ramat Gan (R)	30	3	6	21	15	58	−43	12	Relegated to Liga Artzit

Source: rsssf.com
(C) Champions; (R) Relegated

== Results ==
Home \ Away	BnY	HBS	HHA	HJE	HKS	HPT	HRG	HRL	HTA	HYE	MJA	MNE	MPT	MRA	MTA	STA
Bnei Yehuda	—	1–1	4–2	0–0	3–1	2–0	2–1	4–1	0–1	0–0	0–2	3–0	1–1	0–0	1–1	1–0
Hapoel Be'er Sheva	3–2	—	2–1	0–1	0–0	0–0	1–0	0–0	1–2	1–1	1–1	0–0	5–3	1–0	3–3	0–0
Hapoel Haifa	2–1	1–1	—	0–0	0–4	0–0	5–0	1–0	0–0	2–1	3–2	1–0	1–1	0–0	0–0	2–1
Hapoel Jerusalem	1–3	1–0	2–0	—	2–0	1–1	3–1	0–0	2–3	1–0	1–0	3–3	1–1	4–0	1–1	3–1
Hapoel Kfar Saba	3–3	0–0	1–1	2–1	—	1–0	2–1	1–0	1–1	1–3	1–0	1–1	2–3	1–0	1–0	1–1
Hapoel Petah Tikva	3–1	0–0	2–1	2–1	2–1	—	2–1	0–0	1–1	0–0	3–2	1–0	0–0	0–0	0–0	1–2
Hapoel Ramat Gan	0–1	1–3	0–2	1–1	0–0	1–0	—	0–0	0–1	0–2	0–0	0–2	0–0	2–0	0–1	0–1
Hapoel Rishon LeZion	0–0	4–0	2–0	0–0	2–1	2–2	0–1	—	1–1	0–1	0–0	1–0	1–2	2–0	0–0	3–0
Hapoel Tel Aviv	1–0	1–2	2–0	0–0	3–1	3–3	6–0	1–1	—	2–0	1–2	4–2	5–1	1–0	3–0	0–1
Hapoel Yehud	0–0	1–0	0–0	0–0	0–0	0–0	3–0	0–1	0–0	—	1–4	0–0	0–1	1–0	4–0	1–0
Maccabi Jaffa	0–0	2–0	6–2	0–0	3–2	1–0	3–1	2–1	1–1	1–2	—	1–1	1–1	1–1	2–2	1–0
Maccabi Netanya	0–0	2–1	3–0	2–0	0–2	0–0	3–0	0–1	2–2	1–0	3–0	—	3–2	1–0	1–1	0–0
Maccabi Petah Tikva	0–1	2–1	2–1	2–0	3–2	2–1	6–1	1–1	0–0	1–1	5–1	4–0	—	1–2	1–2	1–2
Maccabi Ramat Amidar	1–1	0–1	3–0	1–0	0–0	1–1	2–2	0–1	4–2	0–0	1–0	0–0	0–0	—	1–0	2–1
Maccabi Tel Aviv	1–2	0–1	3–1	1–0	2–1	2–0	1–0	0–0	1–1	2–2	0–1	2–1	2–1	4–2	—	0–0
Shimshon Tel Aviv	1–1	2–1	1–1	0–0	1–0	3–0	5–1	0–0	3–1	0–0	1–3	0–0	1–1	2–0	2–1	—

Legend: Blue = home team win; Yellow = draw; Red = away team win.
