= List of Beitar Ramla F.C. seasons =

This is a list of seasons played by Beitar Ramla Football Club in Israeli and European football, from 1953 (when the club first played in the Israeli football league system) to the most recent completed season, including seasons in which the club was merged with Maccabi Ramla (between 2000 and 2011, playing as Ironi Ramla) and with Beitar Tel Aviv (starting from 2011, playing as Beitar Tel Aviv Ramla). It details the club's achievements in major competitions, and the top scorers for each season. Top scorers in bold were also the top scorers in the Israeli league that season. Records of minor competitions such as the Lilian Cup are not included due to them being considered of less importance than the State Cup and the Toto Cup.

== History ==
Beitar Ramla was established in 1951 and worked its way up the Israeli football league system, reaching the second tier in 1963 and playing a total of 20 seasons at the second division. During the 1990s the club suffered financially, eventually folding in the middle of the 1998–99 season The folded club merged with Maccabi Ramla to form Ironi Ramla, which started to play in the lowest division, Liga Gimel, and managed to promote twice, to Liga Alef within the next seven seasons. However, backing from the Municipality of Ramla was cut and the club once again suffered financially. In 2011 the club merged with Beitar Tel Aviv to form Beitar Tel Aviv Ramla, which played in second division Liga Leumit.

== Seasons ==
=== As Beitar Ramla ===
Season	League									State Cup	League Cup	International (Asia/Europe)	Top goalscorer (Note: Goals in all competitions (Liga Leumit or Liga Al, State Cup, Toto Cup and European) are counted.)	
Season	Division	P	W	D	L	F	A	Pts	Pos	State Cup	League Cup	International (Asia/Europe)	Name	Goals
1953–54	Gimel South									R1	–	–		
1954–55	Gimel Central	26	7	5	14	21	40	19	11th	–	–	–		
1955–56	Gimel Central	14							3rd	–	–	–		
1956–57	Gimel Central									R5	–	–		
1957–58	Gimel Central	17				68	10	32	1st (Note: League matches were suspended by the IFA due to suspicions of bribery.)	R4	–	–		
1958–59	Gimel Central									R2	–	–		
1959–60	Bet South B	30				78	57	33	7th	R7	–	–		
1960–61	Bet South B	30				77	35	46	3rd	R7	–	–		
1961–62	Bet South B	30				66	35	38	5th	R3	–	–		
1962–63	Bet South B	30				82	33	42	2nd	Round of 16	–	–		
1963–64	Alef South	26	7	8	11	31	42	22	9th	Round of 16	–	–		
1964–65	Alef South	30	15	7	8	50	40	37	3rd	R5	–	–		
1965–66	Leumit	30	13	5	12	51	47	31	7th	R5	–	–		
1966–67	Alef South	60	23	10	27	95	99	56	7th	R5	–	–		
1967–68	Alef South	60	23	10	27	95	99	56	7th	R5	–	–		
1968–69	Alef South	30	12	7	11	42	46	31	8th	R6	–	–		
1969–70	Alef South	30	8	9	13	34	43	25	11th	R6	–	–		
1970–71	Alef South	30	7	9	14	43	57	23	14th	R4	–	–		
1971–72	Alef South	30	7	13	10	28	30	27	9th	R5	–	–		
1972–73	Alef	30	10	10	10	37	41	30	8th	R6	Group	–		
1973–74	Alef South	30	10	10	10	34	32	30	6th	Round of 16	–	–		
1974–75	Alef South	30	10	8	12	27	25	28	8th	R2	–	–		
1975–76	Alef South	32	10	11	11	39	44	31	7th	R2	–	–		
1976–77	Alef South	26	9	8	9	33	29	26	7th	R6	–	–		
1977–78	Alef South	26	6	10	10	15	25	22	12th	R6	–	–		
1978–79	Alef South	26	10	11	5	30	22	31	5th	R7	–	–		
1979–80	Alef	26	12	9	5	32	20	33	2nd	R5	–	–		
1980–81	Artzit	30	6	14	10	18	23	26	10th	R6	–	–		
1981–82	Artzit	30	9	11	10	27	24	29	7th	R7	–	–		
1982–83	Artzit	30	8	12	10	34	39	36	10th	R6	–	–		
1983–84	Artzit	30	8	14	8	21	21	38	10th	Round of 16	–	–		
1984–85	Artzit	30	8	10	12	25	40	34	12th	R7	Group	–		
1985–86	Artzit	30	8	14	8	27	27	38	10th	R7	Group	–		
1986–87	Artzit	30	8	13	9	25	37	37	14th	R8	Group	–		
1987–88	Alef South	30	14	14	2	37	14	42	1st		–	–		
1988–89	Artzit	33	5	17	11	21	33	28 (Note: Beitar Ramla had four points deducted.)	14th		Group	–		
1989–90	Alef South	30	10	13	7	34	29	29 (Note: Beitar Ramla had four points deducted.)	7th		–	–		
1990–91	Alef South	30	12	7	11	33	37	31	8th		–	–		
1991–92	Alef South	30	20	7	3	51	18	47	2nd		–	–		
1992–93	Alef South	30	11	12	7	32	27	34	7th	R8	–	–		
1993–94	Alef South	30	9	7	14	35	43	25	11th		–	–		
1994–95	Alef South	30				31	49	25	14th		–	–		
1995–96	Alef South	30				33	46	36	12th		–	–		
1996–97	Alef South	30	10	6	14	31	39	36	10th		–	–		
1997–98	Alef South	30	10	8	12	33	43	38	8th		–	–		
1998–99	Alef South	30	0	0	30	0	60	0 (Note: Beitar Ramla withdrew from the league. The IFA had set all their matches as a 0–2 loss.)	16th		–	–		

=== As Ironi Ramla ===
Season	League									State Cup	League Cup	International (Asia/Europe)	Top goalscorer	
Season	Division	P	W	D	L	F	A	Pts	Pos	State Cup	League Cup	International (Asia/Europe)	Name	Goals
1999–2000	Gimel Tel Aviv	26	21	4	1	91	30	67	3rd		–	–		
2000–01	Gimel Central								1st	R6	–	–		
2001–02	Bet South B	30	13	2	15	55	58	41	7th	R2	–	–		
2002–03	Bet South B	30	9	7	14	35	58	34	14th	R1	–	–		
2003–04	Bet South B	30	11	5	14	54	54	38	11th		–	–		
2004–05	Bet South B	30	8	3	19	40	64	27	13th		–	–		
2005–06	Bet South B	30	21	6	3	71	21	69	2nd		–	–		
2006–07	Alef South	26	9	9	8	32	35	36	6th	R6	–	–	Adir Alok	7
2007–08	Alef South	26	10	4	12	35	41	34	10th	R6	–	–	Adir Alok	10
2008–09	Alef South	26	4	1	21	21	55	13	13th	R5	–	–	Itzhak Abushdid	5
2009–10	Bet South B	30	18	5	7	58	27	59	2nd	R2	–	–	Ohad Ron	20
2010–11	Bet South	–	–	–	–	–	–	–	– (Note: Ironi Ramla Was ejected from the league and its results were nullified.)	–	–	–	Adir Alok	6

=== As Beitar Tel Aviv Ramla ===
Season	League									State Cup	League Cup	International (Asia/Europe)	Top goalscorer	
Season	Division	P	W	D	L	F	A	Pts	Pos	State Cup	League Cup	International (Asia/Europe)	Name	Goals
2011–12	Leumit	33	12	10	11	48	43	25 (Note: Beitar Tel Aviv Ramla scored 42 points in the regular season, which were halved at the beginning of the play-offs. The club scored 4 more points during the play-offs for a total of 46 points.)	8th	R8	Group	–	Itzhak Abushdid	14
2012–13	Leumit	37	9	13	15	45	58	40	14th	R8	Group	–	Dan Roman	10
2013–14	Leumit	37	10	15	12	39	45	45	7th	R8	–	–	Itzhak Abushdid; Gil Gilkarov	7
2014–15	Leumit	37	12	11	14	44	53	47	12th	R8	QF	–	Uri Magbo	9
2015–16	Leumit	37	19	4	14	60	50	61	9th	QF	Group	–	Rotem Shimol	17

== Key ==
- P = Played
- W = Games won
- D = Games drawn
- L = Games lost
- F = Goals for
- A = Goals against
- Pts = Points
- Pos = Final position
- Leumit = Liga Leumit (National League)
- Artzit = Liga Artzit (Nationwide League)
- Premier = Liga Al (Premier League)
- Pal. League = Palestine League
- F = Final
- Group = Group stage
- QF = Quarter-finals
- QR1 = First Qualifying Round
- QR2 = Second Qualifying Round
- QR3 = Third Qualifying Round
- QR4 = Fourth Qualifying Round
- RInt = Intermediate Round
- R1 = Round 1
- R2 = Round 2
- R3 = Round 3
- R4 = Round 4
- R5 = Round 5
- R6 = Round 6
- SF = Semi-finals

Champions	Runners-up	Promoted	Relegated
