= 1990–91 Liga Alef =

Israeli football season

The 1990–91 Liga Alef season saw Maccabi Herzliya (champions of the North Division) and Sektzia Nes Tziona (champions of the South Division) win their regional divisions and promotion to Liga Artzit.

At the bottom, Beitar Nahariya, Maccabi Hadera (from the North division), Hapoel Lod and Maccabi Shikun HaMizrah (from the South division) relegated to Liga Bet.

== North Division ==
Pos	Team	Pld	W	D	L	GF	GA	GD	Pts	Qualification or relegation
1	Maccabi Herzliya	30	19	7	4	62	24	+38	45	Promoted to Liga Artzit
2	Hapoel Acre	30	15	10	5	53	31	+22	40	Promotion/relegation play-offs
3	Hapoel Nazareth Illit	30	14	10	6	38	24	+14	38	
4	Maccabi Ahi Nazareth	30	12	9	9	37	37	0	33	
5	Hapoel Beit She'an	30	10	12	8	30	27	+3	32	
6	Maccabi Isfiya	30	11	9	10	37	44	−7	31	
7	Hapoel Umm al-Fahm	30	10	10	10	40	40	0	30	
8	Maccabi Tamra	30	10	10	10	36	40	−4	30	
9	Hapoel Daliyat al-Karmel	30	9	10	11	27	36	−9	28	
10	Hapoel Kiryat Shmona	30	8	11	11	29	34	−5	27	
11	Maccabi Bnei Hatzor	30	6	14	10	39	41	−2	26	
12	Maccabi Or Akiva	30	9	8	13	39	46	−7	26	
13	Hapoel Tayibe	30	11	4	15	24	38	−14	26	
14	Maccabi Afula	30	9	7	14	36	42	−6	25	
15	Beitar Nahariya	30	8	7	15	30	39	−9	23	Relegated to Liga Bet
16	Maccabi Hadera	30	5	10	15	25	39	−14	20	Relegated to Liga Bet

Updated to match(es) played on May 1991. Source: Yedioth Ahronoth (in Hebrew)

== South Division ==
Pos	Team	Pld	W	D	L	GF	GA	GD	Pts	Qualification or relegation
1	Sektzia Nes Tziona	30	20	8	2	77	31	+46	48	Promoted to Liga Artzit
2	Hakoah Ramat Gan	30	19	8	3	62	19	+43	46	Promotion/relegation play-offs
3	Hapoel Ashkelon	30	18	8	4	61	30	+31	44	
4	Maccabi Kiryat Gat	30	14	9	7	45	34	+11	37	
5	Hapoel Kiryat Ono	30	14	8	8	39	23	+16	36	
6	Maccabi Lazaros Holon	30	14	8	8	49	36	+13	36	
7	Hapoel Kiryat Malakhi	30	14	8	8	45	39	+6	34	
8	Beitar Ramla	30	12	7	11	33	37	−4	31	
9	Hapoel Yehud	30	9	10	11	47	42	+5	28	
10	Hapoel Marmorek	30	7	11	12	43	42	+1	25	
11	Maccabi HaShikma Ramat Hen	30	7	9	14	33	42	−9	23	
12	Hapoel Rishon LeZion	30	4	14	12	21	38	−17	22	
13	Hapoel Kfar Shalem	30	6	9	15	35	49	−14	21	
14	Hapoel Be'er Ya'akov	30	7	7	16	22	38	−16	21	
15	Hapoel Lod	30	3	7	20	26	76	−50	13	Relegated to Liga Bet
16	Maccabi Shikun HaMizrah	30	3	7	20	23	85	−62	13	Relegated to Liga Bet

Updated to match(es) played on May 1991. Source: Yedioth Ahronoth (in Hebrew)
- Hapoel Kiryat Malakhi had 2 points deducted.

== Promotion/relegation play-offs ==
The two second-placed clubs (Hapoel Acre and Hakoah Ramat Gan) played off to face the 14th-placed club from Liga Artzit (Hapoel Bat Yam). Hakoah Ramat Gan won both matches and were promoted, whilst Bat Yam were relegated to Liga Alef.

=== First round ===
Hapoel Acre	1–3	Hakoah Ramat Gan

=== Second round ===
Hapoel Bat Yam	1–2	Hakoah Ramat Gan
