= 1979–80 Liga Bet =

Israeli football season

The 1979–80 Liga Bet season saw Maccabi Shefa-'Amr, Maccabi Or Akiva, Hapoel Rosh HaAyin and Maccabi Be'er Sheva win their regional divisions and promoted to Liga Alef.

At the bottom, Maccabi Tiberias, Beitar al-Amal Nazareth (from North A division), Maccabi Zikhron Ya'akov, Maccabi HaSharon Netanya (from North B division), Beitar Holon, Beitar Jaffa (from South A division), Hapoel Ofakim and Hapoel Kiryat Gat (from South B division) were all automatically relegated to Liga Gimel.

== North Division A ==
Pos	Team	Pld	W	D	L	GF	GA	GD	Pts	Promotion or relegation
1	Maccabi Shefa-'Amr	26	–	–	–	90	26	+64	47	Promoted to Liga Alef
2	Maccabi Kiryat Bialik	26	–	–	–	53	32	+21	36	
3	Hapoel Kfar Kama	26	–	–	–	52	38	+14	29	
4	Maccabi Acre	26	–	–	–	54	44	+10	27	
5	Hapoel Migdal HaEmek	26	–	–	–	34	49	−15	26	
6	Maccabi Neve Sha'anan	26	–	–	–	29	31	−2	25	
7	Maccabi Afula	26	–	–	–	34	48	−14	24	
8	Hapoel Bnei Acre	26	–	–	–	36	43	−7	23	
9	Hapoel Hatzor	26	–	–	–	33	36	−3	22	
10	Maccabi Hatzor	26	–	–	–	44	51	−7	22	
11	Beitar Kiryat Shmona	26	–	–	–	30	47	−17	22	
12	Hapoel Safed	26	–	–	–	40	36	+4	20	
13	Maccabi Tiberias	26	–	–	–	40	50	−10	20	Relegated to Liga Gimel
14	Beitar al-Amal Nazareth	26	–	–	–	34	72	−38	15	Relegated to Liga Gimel

== North Division B ==
Pos	Team	Pld	W	D	L	GF	GA	GD	Pts	Promotion or relegation
1	Maccabi Or Akiva	26	–	–	–	54	27	+27	39	Promoted to Liga Alef
2	Hapoel Kafr Sulam	26	–	–	–	44	27	+17	32	
3	Maccabi Fureidis	26	–	–	–	45	37	+8	29	
4	Hapoel Givat Haim	26	–	–	–	35	36	−1	28	
5	Hapoel Nahliel	26	–	–	–	25	23	+2	27	
6	Hapoel Kiryat Yam	26	–	–	–	41	38	+3	26	
7	Hapoel Afula	26	–	–	–	45	49	−4	25	
8	Hapoel Daliyat al-Karmel	26	–	–	–	31	35	−4	25	
9	Hapoel Tayibe	26	–	–	–	25	36	−11	25	
10	Hapoel Kafr Qara	26	–	–	–	34	36	−2	24	
11	Hapoel Aliyah Kfar Saba	26	–	–	–	38	52	−14	24	
12	Hapoel HaTzair Haifa	26	–	–	–	36	29	+7	23	
13	Maccabi Zikhron Ya'akov	26	–	–	–	32	42	−10	22	Relegated to Liga Gimel
14	Maccabi HaSharon Netanya	26	–	–	–	20	44	−24	13	Relegated to Liga Gimel

== South Division A ==
Pos	Team	Pld	W	D	L	GF	GA	GD	Pts	Promotion or relegation
1	Hapoel Rosh HaAyin	26	–	–	–	60	25	+35	36	Promoted to Liga Alef
2	Tzafririm Holon (Note: Beitar Herzliya - Tzafririm Holon which ended 0-0, was awarded 2-0 to Tzafririm Holon. Prior to the last match of the season, the Israel Football Association reversed its decision, and the original result stood as is.)	26	–	–	–	50	17	+33	36	
3	Maccabi HaShikma Ramat Gan	26	–	–	–	43	11	+32	33	
4	Hapoel Kfar Shalem	26	–	–	–	35	23	+12	33	
5	Hapoel Azor	26	–	–	–	40	26	+14	30	
6	Hapoel Ganei Tikva	26	–	–	–	30	40	−10	29	
7	Hapoel Ihud Tzeirei Jaffa	26	–	–	–	33	27	+6	27	
8	Hapoel Kiryat Shalom	26	–	–	–	37	33	+4	27	
9	Hapoel Tira	26	–	–	–	36	31	+5	26	
10	Hapoel Mahane Yehuda	26	–	–	–	26	35	−9	22	
11	Maccabi Ramla	26	–	–	–	26	43	−17	19	
12	Beitar Herzliya	26	–	–	–	22	38	−16	18	
13	Beitar Holon	26	–	–	–	18	61	−43	16	Relegated to Liga Gimel
14	Beitar Jaffa	26	–	–	–	17	57	−40	12	Relegated to Liga Gimel

== South Division B ==
Pos	Team	Pld	W	D	L	GF	GA	GD	Pts	Promotion or relegation
1	Maccabi Be'er Sheva	26	–	–	–	46	18	+28	38	Promoted to Liga Alef
2	Hapoel Be'er Ya'akov	26	–	–	–	54	28	+26	34	
3	Hapoel Yeruham	26	–	–	–	40	27	+13	33	
4	Hapoel Merhavim	26	–	–	–	42	36	+6	28	
5	SK Nes Tziona	26	–	–	–	41	46	−5	26	
6	Beitar Ashdod (Note: Beitar Ashdod - Hapoel Kiryat Gat which ended 1-1, was awarded 2-0 to Hapoel Kiryat Gat after Beitar Ashdod was found guilty for fielding ineligible players. Later, Beitar Ashdod was cleared of allegation, and the original result stood as is.)	26	–	–	–	38	48	−10	25	
7	Hapoel Kiryat Malakhi	26	–	–	–	35	34	+1	23	
8	Maccabi Rehovot	26	–	–	–	37	40	−3	23	
9	Maccabi Ashkelon	26	–	–	–	29	38	−9	23	
10	Maccabi Shikun HaMizrah	26	–	–	–	30	41	−11	22	
11	Beitar Lod	26	–	–	–	36	44	−8	21	
12	Hapoel Gedera	26	–	–	–	24	35	−11	21	
13	Hapoel Ofakim	26	–	–	–	31	44	−13	21	Relegated to Liga Gimel
14	Hapoel Kiryat Gat	26	–	–	–	26	35	−9	18	Relegated to Liga Gimel
