= 1987–88 Liga Bet =

Israeli football season

The 1987–88 Liga Bet season saw Maccabi Acre, Hapoel Daliyat al-Karmel, Maccabi Shikun HaMizrah and Hapoel Be'er Ya'akov win their regional divisions and promoted to Liga Alef.

At the bottom, Maccabi Kiryat Bialik, Hapoel Bnei Acre (from North A division), Hapoel Fureidis, Haopel Yokne'am (from North B division), M.M. Givat Shmuel, Maccabi Bat Yam (from South A division), Maccabi Kiryat Ekron and Hapoel Mevaseret Zion (from South B division) were all automatically relegated to Liga Gimel.

== North Division A ==
Pos	Team	Pld	W	D	L	GF	GA	GD	Pts	Promotion or relegation
1	Maccabi Acre	26	–	–	–	51	32	+19	39	Promoted to Liga Alef
2	Sektzia Ma'alot	26	–	–	–	42	20	+22	39	
3	Maccabi Bnei Hatzor	26	–	–	–	43	26	+17	33	
4	Hapoel Nazareth Illit	26	–	–	–	40	28	+12	32	
5	Hapoel Majd al-Krum	26	–	–	–	35	34	+1	25	
6	Maccabi Kiryat Ata (Note: Maccabi Givat HaRakafot was renamed Maccabi Kiryat Ata for the season.)	26	–	–	–	30	30	0	25	
7	Maccabi Kafr Kanna	26	–	–	–	37	43	−6	25	
8	Beitar Ma'alot	26	–	–	–	29	36	−7	23	
9	Maccabi Shefa-Amr	26	–	–	–	26	33	−7	23	
10	Hapoel Sakhnin	26	–	–	–	41	50	−9	23	
11	Hapoel Safed	26	–	–	–	26	28	−2	22	
12	Hapoel Daburiyya	26	–	–	–	36	34	+2	20	
13	Hapoel Kiryat Bialik	26	–	–	–	34	47	−13	19	Relegated to Liga Gimel
14	Hapoel Bnei Acre	26	–	–	–	17	51	−34	10	Relegated to Liga Gimel

== North Division B ==
Pos	Team	Pld	W	D	L	GF	GA	GD	Pts	Promotion or relegation
1	Hapoel Daliyat al-Karmel	26	–	–	–	55	23	+32	38	Promoted to Liga Alef
2	Hapoel Migdal HaEmek	26	–	–	–	40	30	+10	31	
3	Beitar Kfar Yona	26	–	–	–	41	35	+6	30	
4	Maccabi Tzur Shalom	26	–	–	–	52	47	+5	30	
5	Hapoel Givat Olga	26	–	–	–	36	31	+5	29	
6	Hapoel Iksal	26	–	–	–	41	33	+8	28	
7	Hapoel Kafr Sulam	26	–	–	–	41	35	+6	28	
8	Hapoel Umm al-Fahm	26	–	–	–	40	36	+4	24	
9	Hapoel Nahliel	26	–	–	–	40	38	+2	24	
10	Maccabi Tzofei Haifa	26	–	–	–	33	48	−15	24	
11	Hapoel Tel Hanan	26	–	–	–	42	50	−8	23	
12	Maccabi Or Akiva	26	–	–	–	29	42	−13	23	
13	Hapoel Fureidis	26	–	–	–	34	49	−15	19	Relegated to Liga Gimel
14	Hapoel Yokneam	26	–	–	–	29	56	−27	13	Relegated to Liga Gimel

== South Division A ==
Pos	Team	Pld	W	D	L	GF	GA	GD	Pts	Promotion or relegation
1	Maccabi Shikun HaMizrah	26	–	–	–	45	17	+28	37	Promoted to Liga Alef
2	Hapoel Kafr Qasim	26	–	–	–	36	20	+16	34	
3	Maccabi HaShikma Ramat Gan	26	–	–	–	41	32	+9	32	
4	Hapoel Kfar Shalem	26	–	–	–	44	35	+9	28	
5	Hapoel Rosh HaAyin	26	–	–	–	23	38	−15	27	
6	Hapoel Ihud Tzeirei Jaffa	26	–	–	–	28	26	+2	25	
7	Beitar Lod	26	–	–	–	23	31	−8	25	
8	Hapoel Nahlat Yehuda	26	–	–	–	29	32	−3	24	
9	Hapoel Herzliya	26	–	–	–	28	31	−3	24	
10	Beitar Rosh HaAyin	26	–	–	–	27	44	−17	24	
11	Hapoel Aliyah Kfar Saba	26	–	–	–	39	32	+7	23	
12	Hapoel Jaljulia	26	–	–	–	26	33	−7	23	
13	M.M. Givat Shmuel	26	–	–	–	35	34	+1	21	Relegated to Liga Gimel
14	Maccabi Bat Yam	26	–	–	–	23	53	−30	15	Relegated to Liga Gimel

== South Division B ==
Pos	Team	Pld	W	D	L	GF	GA	GD	Pts	Promotion or relegation
1	Hapoel Be'er Ya'akov	26	–	–	–	60	14	+46	42	Promoted to Liga Alef
2	Hapoel Yeruham	26	–	–	–	47	22	+25	38	
3	Beitar Be'er Sheva	26	–	–	–	51	30	+21	35	
4	Hapoel Eilat	26	–	–	–	39	29	+10	32	
5	Ironi Ashdod	26	–	–	–	33	25	+8	28	
6	SK Nes Tziona	26	–	–	–	32	25	+7	25	
7	Beitar Yavne	26	–	–	–	31	28	+3	25	
8	Maccabi Rehovot	26	–	–	–	25	33	−8	23	
9	Maccabi Ramat Ben Zvi	26	–	–	–	24	41	−17	23	
10	Beitar Kiryat Gat	26	–	–	–	28	36	−8	20	
11	Maccabi Ramla	26	–	–	–	36	40	−4	21	
12	Beitar Kiryat Malakhi	26	–	–	–	25	43	−18	20	
13	Maccabi Kiryat Ekron	26	–	–	–	22	41	−19	20	Relegated to Liga Gimel
14	Hapoel Mevaseret Zion	26	–	–	–	22	64	−42	11	Relegated to Liga Gimel
