= 1993–94 Liga Alef =

Israeli football season

The 1993–94 Liga Alef season saw Hapoel Ramat Gan (champions of the North Division) and Maccabi Kiryat Gat (champions of the South Division) win their regional divisions and promotion to Liga Artzit, along with runners-up Hapoel Kiryat Shmona and Hapoel Lod.

At the bottom, Beitar Nahariya (from the North division) and Maccabi HaShikma Ramat Hen (from the South division) finished bottom and relegated to Liga Bet.

== North Division ==
Pos	Team	Pld	W	D	L	GF	GA	GD	Pts	Qualification or relegation
1	Hapoel Ramat Gan	30	22	5	3	71	26	+45	47 (Note: Hapoel Ramat Gan had 2 points deducted.)	Promoted to Liga Artzit
2	Hapoel Kiryat Shmona	30	16	11	3	43	21	+22	43	Promoted to Liga Artzit
3	Maccabi Afula	30	15	9	6	44	28	+16	39	
4	Hapoel Acre	30	13	9	8	43	29	+14	35	
5	Hapoel Tirat HaCarmel	30	13	9	8	39	27	+12	35	
6	Maccabi Tamra	30	9	12	9	42	38	+4	30	
7	Hapoel Givat Olga	30	11	8	11	37	41	−4	30	
8	Maccabi Or Akiva	30	10	8	12	44	43	+1	28	
9	Hapoel Umm al-Fahm	30	12	3	15	40	43	−3	27	
10	Hapoel Nazareth Illit	30	9	8	13	31	36	−5	26	
11	Maccabi Hadera	30	9	7	14	43	43	0	25	
12	Maccabi Ahi Nazareth	30	10	5	15	36	47	−11	25	
13	Hapoel Tiberias	30	9	5	16	31	45	−14	23	
14	Maccabi Shefa-'Amr	30	4	15	11	29	45	−16	23	
15	Maccabi Isfiya	30	9	3	18	31	59	−28	21	
16	Beitar Nahariya	30	5	11	14	20	53	−33	21	Relegated to Liga Bet

Updated to match(es) played on 14 May 1994. Source: Yedioth Ahronoth (in Hebrew)

== South Division ==
Pos	Team	Pld	W	D	L	GF	GA	GD	Pts	Qualification or relegation
1	Maccabi Kiryat Gat	30	22	7	1	53	20	+33	51	Promoted to Liga Artzit
2	Hapoel Lod	30	19	9	2	66	27	+39	47	Promoted to Liga Artzit
3	Hapoel Kiryat Ono	30	16	10	4	44	19	+25	42	
4	Beitar Be'er Sheva	30	12	11	7	38	23	+15	35	
5	Hapoel Yeruham	30	13	7	10	53	38	+15	33	
6	Hapoel Kfar Shalem	30	12	7	11	51	49	+2	31	
7	Hapoel Kiryat Malakhi	30	9	12	9	39	45	−6	30	
8	Hapoel Ihud Tzeirei Jaffa	30	11	5	14	43	42	+1	27	
9	Maccabi Sha'arayim	30	11	5	14	33	43	−10	27	
10	Maccabi Ramat Amidar	30	9	8	13	26	32	−6	26	
11	Beitar Ramla	30	9	7	14	35	43	−8	25	
12	Hapoel Marmorek	30	8	8	14	32	50	−18	24	
13	Maccabi Lazaros Holon	30	7	8	15	29	49	−20	22	
14	Hapoel Or Yehuda	30	7	7	16	26	46	−20	21	
15	Hapoel Be'er Ya'akov	30	6	8	16	31	53	−22	20	
16	Maccabi HaShikma Ramat Hen	30	6	7	17	29	49	−20	19	Relegated to Liga Bet

Updated to match(es) played on 14 May 1994. Source: Yedioth Ahronoth (in Hebrew)
