= 1991–92 Liga Alef =

Israeli football season

The 1991–92 Liga Alef season saw Hapoel Daliyat al-Karmel (champions of the North Division) and Hapoel Ashkelon (champions of the South Division) win their regional divisions and promotion to Liga Artzit.

At the bottom, Maccabi Tamra, Maccabi Kafr Kanna (from the North division), Hapoel Aliyah Kfar Saba and Hapoel Yehud (from the South division) relegated to Liga Bet.

== North Division ==
Pos	Team	Pld	W	D	L	GF	GA	GD	Pts	Qualification or relegation
1	Hapoel Daliyat al-Karmel	30	17	12	1	43	15	+28	46	Promoted to Liga Artzit
2	Hapoel Kiryat Shmona	30	19	7	4	54	19	+35	45	Promotion/relegation play-offs
3	Hapoel Givat Olga	30	15	10	5	43	28	+15	40	
4	Maccabi Afula	30	14	6	10	50	37	+13	34	
5	Hapoel Tirat HaCarmel	30	13	7	10	29	33	−4	33	
6	Hapoel Umm al-Fahm	30	13	5	12	49	49	0	31	
7	Hapoel Beit She'an	30	8	12	10	29	36	−7	28	
8	Hapoel Acre	30	11	5	14	47	48	−1	27	
9	Maccabi Bnei Hatzor	30	7	12	11	29	42	−13	26	
10	Maccabi Isfiya	30	9	8	13	32	49	−17	26	
11	Hapoel Nazareth Illit	30	8	9	13	36	38	−2	25	
12	Hapoel Tayibe	30	7	11	12	30	38	−8	25	
13	Maccabi Ahi Nazareth	30	9	8	13	30	34	−4	24 (Note: Maccabi Ahi Nazareth had 2 points deducted.)	
14	Maccabi Or Akiva	30	6	11	13	31	41	−10	23	
15	Maccabi Tamra	30	7	9	14	28	42	−14	23	Relegated to Liga Bet
16	Maccabi Kafr Kanna	30	7	8	15	24	35	−11	22	Relegated to Liga Bet

Updated to match(es) played on May 1991. Source: Yedioth Ahronoth (in Hebrew)

== South Division ==
Pos	Team	Pld	W	D	L	GF	GA	GD	Pts	Qualification or relegation
1	Hapoel Ashkelon	30	23	3	4	47	12	+35	49	Promoted to Liga Artzit
2	Beitar Ramla	30	20	7	3	51	18	+33	47	Promotion/relegation play-offs
3	Hapoel Rishon LeZion	30	17	8	5	59	28	+31	42	
4	Beitar Be'er Sheva	30	15	11	4	49	25	+24	41	
5	Hapoel Bat Yam	30	9	14	7	32	27	+5	32	
6	Maccabi Ramat Amidar	30	10	10	10	27	26	+1	30	
7	Hapoel Kfar Shalem	30	9	10	11	43	45	−2	28	
8	Hapoel Kiryat Malakhi	30	8	11	11	28	37	−9	27	
9	Hapoel Be'er Ya'akov	30	9	8	13	35	45	−10	26	
10	Maccabi Kiryat Gat	30	6	13	11	31	36	−5	25	
11	Maccabi HaShikma Ramat Hen	30	8	9	13	26	40	−14	25	
12	Maccabi Lazaros Holon	30	7	10	13	31	41	−10	24	
13	Hapoel Marmorek	30	7	10	13	27	44	−17	24	
14	Hapoel Kiryat Ono	30	7	9	14	27	34	−7	23	
15	Hapoel Aliyah Kfar Saba	30	7	6	17	25	47	−22	20	Relegated to Liga Bet
16	Hapoel Yehud	30	5	7	18	23	56	−33	17	Relegated to Liga Bet

Updated to match(es) played on May 1991. Source: Yedioth Ahronoth (in Hebrew)

== Promotion/relegation play-offs ==
The two second-placed clubs (Hapoel Kiryat Shmona and Beitar Ramla) played off to face the 14th-placed club from Liga Artzit (Hapoel Ashdod). Hapoel Kiryat Shmona won the first match, but lost to Hapoel Ashdod in the second round, so Hapoel Ashdod remained in Liga Artzit and Kiryat Shmona remained in Liga Alef.

=== First round ===
Hapoel Kiryat Shmona	3–2	Beitar Ramla

=== Second round ===
Hapoel Ashdod	1–0	Hapoel Kiryat Shmona
