= 1988–89 Liga Alef =

Israeli football season

The 1988–89 Liga Alef season saw Hapoel Tirat HaCarmel (champions of the North Division) and Hapoel Rishon LeZion (champions of the South Division) win their regional divisions and promotion to Liga Artzit. The confirmation of Hapoel Tirat HaCarmel's promotion was delayed as the final round match between Maccabi Ahi Nazareth (who could overtake Hapoel Tirat HaCarmel) and Beitar Nahariya was abandoned. The IFA disciplinary committee ruled that Ahi Nazareth were responsible to the abandonment and set the match result to 2–0 to Beitar Nahariya.

At the bottom, Hapoel Tira, Hapoel Kiryat Ata (from the North division), Hapoel Ramla and Hapoel Beit Shemesh (from the South division) relegated to Liga Bet.

== North Division ==
Pos	Team	Pld	W	D	L	GF	GA	GD	Pts	Qualification or relegation
1	Hapoel Tirat HaCarmel	30	17	9	4	52	24	+28	43	Promoted to Liga Artzit
2	Hapoel Acre	30	17	9	4	46	18	+28	43	
3	Maccabi Ahi Nazareth	30	16	9	5	45	22	+23	41	
4	Hapoel Beit She'an	30	11	12	7	34	23	+11	34	
5	Maccabi Afula	30	10	12	8	34	34	0	32	
6	Maccabi Isfiya	30	11	10	9	35	41	−6	32	
7	Maccabi Acre	30	7	17	6	28	30	−2	31	
8	Beitar Nahariya	30	11	8	11	32	35	−3	30	
9	Hapoel Bnei Nazareth	30	8	13	9	30	29	+1	29	
10	Hapoel Tayibe	30	8	12	10	31	28	+3	28	
11	Hapoel Kiryat Shmona	30	11	6	13	28	35	−7	28	
12	Maccabi Hadera	30	7	13	10	26	32	−6	27	
13	Beitar Haifa	30	6	14	10	26	33	−7	26	
14	Hapoel Daliyat al-Karmel	30	9	7	14	36	38	−2	25	
15	Hapoel Tira	30	4	12	14	24	47	−23	20	Relegated to Liga Bet
16	Hapoel Kiryat Ata	30	2	7	21	16	53	−37	11	Relegated to Liga Bet

Updated to match(es) played on May 1989. Source: Yedioth Ahronoth (in Hebrew)

== South Division ==
Pos	Team	Pld	W	D	L	GF	GA	GD	Pts	Qualification or relegation
1	Hapoel Rishon LeZion	30	19	8	3	57	19	+38	46	Promoted to Liga Artzit
2	Hapoel Ashdod	30	17	8	5	44	24	+20	42	
3	Hapoel Marmorek	30	14	8	8	45	28	+17	36	
4	Maccabi Herzliya	30	12	11	7	37	30	+7	35	
5	Hapoel Ashkelon	30	9	15	6	37	28	+9	33	
6	Hakoah Ramat Gan	30	10	12	8	39	37	+2	32	
7	Maccabi Lazaros Holon	30	8	13	9	33	36	−3	29	
8	Hapoel Kiryat Malakhi	40	9	19	12	30	37	−7	37	
9	Maccabi Shikun HaMizrah	30	7	13	10	27	39	−12	27	
10	Hapoel Kiryat Ono	30	7	12	11	22	29	−7	26	
11	Hapoel Be'er Ya'akov	30	6	14	10	21	29	−8	26	
12	Hapoel Or Yehuda	30	7	11	12	28	35	−7	25	
13	Hapoel Dimona	30	7	10	13	28	37	−9	24	
14	Maccabi Kiryat Gat	30	7	10	13	26	35	−9	24	
15	Hapoel Ramla	30	7	10	13	22	37	−15	24	Relegated to Liga Bet
16	Hapoel Beit Shemesh	30	7	10	13	40	57	−17	24	Relegated to Liga Bet

Updated to match(es) played on May 1989. Source: Yedioth Ahronoth (in Hebrew)
