= 1997–98 Liga Alef =

Israeli football season

The 1997–98 Liga Alef season saw Ahi Nazareth and Beitar Be'er Sheva promoted to Liga Artzit as the respective winners of the North and South division.

At the bottom, Hapoel Karmiel, Maccabi Hadera (from North division), Hapoel Kiryat Ono and Hapoel Yehud (from South division) were all relegated to Liga Bet.

== North Division ==
| Pos | Team | Pld | W | D | L | GF | GA | GD | Pts | Promotion or relegation |
|---|---|---|---|---|---|---|---|---|---|---|
| 1 | Ahi Nazareth | 30 | 18 | 7 | 5 | 65 | 32 | +33 | 61 | Promoted to Liga Artzit |
| 2 | Hapoel Umm al-Fahm | 30 | 12 | 9 | 9 | 50 | 42 | +8 | 45 | |
| 3 | Hapoel Kiryat Shmona | 30 | 12 | 9 | 9 | 33 | 32 | +1 | 45 | |
| 4 | Hapoel Nazareth Illit | 30 | 12 | 7 | 11 | 53 | 39 | +14 | 43 | |
| 5 | Maccabi Isfiya | 30 | 11 | 10 | 9 | 37 | 38 | −1 | 43 | |
| 6 | Hapoel Acre | 30 | 12 | 4 | 14 | 32 | 39 | −7 | 40 | |
| 7 | Hapoel Hadera | 30 | 8 | 15 | 7 | 30 | 28 | +2 | 39 | |
| 8 | Hapoel Kafr Kanna | 30 | 10 | 9 | 11 | 49 | 51 | −2 | 39 | |
| 9 | Maccabi Tur'an | 30 | 8 | 12 | 10 | 31 | 35 | −4 | 39 (Note: 3 bonus points?) | |
| 10 | Hapoel Majd al-Krum | 30 | 9 | 11 | 10 | 34 | 32 | +2 | 38 | |
| 11 | Maccabi Shefa-'Amr | 30 | 10 | 7 | 13 | 36 | 43 | −7 | 37 | |
| 12 | Maccabi Afula | 30 | 9 | 9 | 12 | 36 | 39 | −3 | 36 | |
| 13 | Hapoel Kafr Qasim | 30 | 8 | 12 | 10 | 28 | 31 | −3 | 36 | |
| 14 | Maccabi Tamra | 30 | 9 | 9 | 12 | 36 | 42 | −6 | 36 | |
| 15 | Hapoel Karmiel | 30 | 10 | 6 | 14 | 37 | 50 | −13 | 36 | Relegated to Liga Bet |
| 16 | Maccabi Hadera | 30 | 10 | 6 | 14 | 25 | 38 | −13 | 36 | Relegated to Liga Bet |

== South Division ==
| Pos | Team | Pld | W | D | L | GF | GA | GD | Pts | Promotion or relegation |
|---|---|---|---|---|---|---|---|---|---|---|
| 1 | Beitar Be'er Sheva | 30 | 24 | 5 | 1 | 79 | 16 | +63 | 77 | Promoted to Liga Artzit |
| 2 | Hapoel Or Yehuda | 30 | 18 | 7 | 5 | 60 | 30 | +30 | 61 | |
| 3 | Maccabi Lazarus Holon | 30 | 14 | 9 | 7 | 45 | 32 | +13 | 51 | |
| 4 | Maccabi Sha'arayim | 30 | 15 | 6 | 9 | 34 | 27 | +7 | 51 | |
| 5 | Hapoel Dimona | 30 | 12 | 10 | 8 | 52 | 27 | +25 | 46 | |
| 6 | Hapoel Ramat HaSharon | 29 | 9 | 13 | 7 | 33 | 32 | +1 | 40 | |
| 7 | Maccabi Ashkelon | 30 | 9 | 11 | 10 | 26 | 29 | −3 | 38 | |
| 8 | Beitar Ramla | 30 | 10 | 8 | 12 | 33 | 43 | −10 | 38 | |
| 9 | Maccabi Ramat Amidar | 30 | 9 | 10 | 11 | 33 | 37 | −4 | 37 | |
| 10 | Hapoel Kfar Shalem | 30 | 8 | 11 | 11 | 35 | 34 | +1 | 35 | |
| 11 | Shimshon Tel Aviv | 30 | 8 | 10 | 12 | 25 | 36 | −11 | 34 | |
| 12 | Hapoel Nahlat Yehuda | 30 | 6 | 15 | 9 | 24 | 31 | −7 | 33 | |
| 13 | Tzeirei Jaffa | 30 | 9 | 6 | 15 | 27 | 52 | −25 | 33 | |
| 14 | Hapoel Yeruham | 30 | 8 | 7 | 15 | 34 | 62 | −28 | 31 | |
| 15 | Hapoel Kiryat Ono | 30 | 7 | 7 | 16 | 27 | 41 | −14 | 28 | Relegated to Liga Bet |
| 16 | Hapoel Yehud | 30 | 2 | 9 | 19 | 14 | 50 | −36 | 15 | Relegated to Liga Bet |
