= 1995–96 Liga Alef =

Israeli football season

The 1995–96 Liga Alef season saw Maccabi Kafr Kanna and Hapoel Ashkelon promoted to Liga Artzit as the respective winners of the North and South division.

At the bottom, Hapoel Givat Olga, Maccabi Or Akiva (from North division), Hapoel Marmorek and Hapoel Merhavim (from South division) were all relegated to Liga Bet.

== North Division ==
Pos	Team	Pld	W	D	L	GF	GA	GD	Pts	Promotion or relegation
1	Maccabi Kafr Kanna	30	–	–	–	49	25	+24	59	Promoted to Liga Artzit
2	Hapoel Kafr Kanna	30	–	–	–	57	30	+27	54	
3	Bnei Sakhnin	30	–	–	–	48	36	+12	54	
4	Maccabi Afula	30	–	–	–	45	33	+12	52	
5	Maccabi Hadera	30	–	–	–	38	36	+2	44	
6	Hapoel Migdal HaEmek	30	–	–	–	36	35	+1	41	
7	Maccabi Ahi Nazareth	30	–	–	–	30	27	+3	40	
8	Hapoel Umm al-Fahm	30	–	–	–	39	43	−4	40	
9	Hapoel Nazareth Illit	30	–	–	–	39	35	+4	39	
10	Maccabi Isfiya	30	–	–	–	31	29	+2	39	
11	Maccabi Shefa-'Amr	30	–	–	–	29	33	−4	37	
12	Hapoel Kafr Qasim	30	–	–	–	34	33	+1	36	
13	Maccabi Tamra	30	–	–	–	33	43	−10	35	
14	Hapoel Acre	30	–	–	–	31	37	−6	32	
15	Hapoel Givat Olga	30	–	–	–	36	56	−20	20	Relegated to Liga Bet
16	Maccabi Or Akiva	30	–	–	–	26	65	−39	19	Relegated to Liga Bet

== South Division ==
Pos	Team	Pld	W	D	L	GF	GA	GD	Pts	Promotion or relegation
1	Hapoel Ashkelon	30	–	–	–	57	22	+35	64	Promoted to Liga Artzit
2	Hapoel Or Yehuda	30	–	–	–	47	17	+30	63	
3	Beitar Be'er Sheva	30	–	–	–	32	32	0	46	
4	Maccabi Shikun HaMizrah	30	–	–	–	63	38	+25	45	
5	Hapoel Yehud	30	–	–	–	41	36	+5	43	
6	Hapoel Lod	30	–	–	–	39	38	+1	43	
7	Maccabi Lazarus Holon	30	–	–	–	48	42	+6	41	
8	Tzeirei Jaffa	30	–	–	–	45	37	+8	40	
9	Maccabi Sha'arayim	30	–	–	–	27	25	+2	39	
10	Maccabi Ramat Amidar	30	–	–	–	34	46	−12	39	
11	Hapoel Kiryat Ono	30	–	–	–	38	37	+1	37	
12	Beitar Ramla	30	–	–	–	33	46	−13	36	
13	Hapoel Yeruham	30	–	–	–	34	51	−17	34	
14	Hapoel Kiryat Malakhi	30	–	–	–	33	54	−21	34	
15	Hapoel Marmorek	30	–	–	–	28	42	−14	28	Relegated to Liga Bet
16	Hapoel Merhavim	30	–	–	–	28	51	−23	20	Relegated to Liga Bet
