= 1994–95 Liga Alef =

Israeli football season

The 1994–95 Liga Alef season saw Maccabi Acre and Hapoel Kfar Shalem promoted to Liga Artzit as the respective winners of the North and South division.

At the bottom, Hapoel Tirat HaCarmel (from North division), Hapoel Be'er Ya'akov and Hapoel Daliyat al-Karmel (from South division) were all relegated to Liga Bet, whilst Hapoel Tiberias (from North division) folded during the season.

== North Division ==
Pos	Team	Pld	W	D	L	GF	GA	GD	Pts	Promotion or relegation
1	Maccabi Acre	28	–	–	–	53	26	+27	42	Promoted to Liga Artzit
2	Bnei Sakhnin	28	–	–	–	57	29	+28	38	
3	Maccabi Ahi Nazareth	28	–	–	–	45	28	+17	35	
4	Hapoel Umm al-Fahm	28	–	–	–	33	25	+8	34	
5	Hapoel Acre	28	–	–	–	36	27	+9	32	
6	Maccabi Shefa-'Amr	28	–	–	–	32	29	+3	31	
7	Hapoel Givat Olga	28	–	–	–	41	38	+3	30	
8	Maccabi Tamra	28	–	–	–	35	38	−3	27	
9	Hapoel Kafr Kanna	28	–	–	–	44	46	−2	25	
10	Maccabi Isfiya	28	–	–	–	30	32	−2	23	
11	Maccabi Afula	28	–	–	–	31	40	−9	22	
12	Maccabi Hadera	28	–	–	–	26	35	−9	22	
13	Maccabi Or Akiva	28	–	–	–	34	52	−18	22	
14	Hapoel Nazareth Illit	28	–	–	–	20	42	−22	21	
15	Hapoel Tirat HaCarmel	28	–	–	–	22	50	−28	17	Relegated to Liga Bet

Hapoel Tiberias folded prior to their fourth match against Hapoel Acre, after they announced their inability to hold a team, following a debt of 700,000 NIS.

== South Division ==
Pos	Team	Pld	W	D	L	GF	GA	GD	Pts	Promotion or relegation
1	Hapoel Kfar Shalem	30	–	–	–	44	18	+26	44	Promoted to Liga Artzit
2	Hapoel Yehud	30	–	–	–	35	17	+18	38	
3	Hapoel Kiryat Ono	30	–	–	–	57	33	+24	36	
4	Hapoel Or Yehuda	30	–	–	–	42	24	+18	35	
5	Maccabi Lazarus Holon	30	–	–	–	42	33	+9	33	
6	Hapoel Yeruham	30	–	–	–	25	47	−22	31	
7	Hapoel Marmorek	30	–	–	–	43	34	+9	30	
8	Beitar Be'er Sheva	30	–	–	–	44	37	+7	29	
9	Maccabi Ramat Amidar	30	–	–	–	33	33	0	29	
10	Hapoel Merhavim	30	–	–	–	44	45	−1	28	
11	Tzeirei Jaffa	30	–	–	–	24	43	−19	27	
12	Maccabi Sha'arayim	30	–	–	–	26	31	−5	26	
13	Hapoel Kiryat Malakhi	30	–	–	–	24	39	−15	26	
14	Beitar Ramla	30	–	–	–	31	49	−18	25	
15	Hapoel Be'er Ya'akov	30	–	–	–	33	44	−11	24	Relegated to Liga Bet
16	Hapoel Daliyat al-Karmel	30	–	–	–	27	60	−33	20	Relegated to Liga Bet
