= 1998–99 Liga Alef =

Israeli football season

The 1998–99 Liga Alef season was held between 11 September 1998 and 29 May 1999. It was the last season (until 2009–10) in which Liga Alef was the third tier of Israeli football, as the creation of the Israeli Premier League in the summer of 1999 meant that it became the fourth tier.

Due to the restructuring, two clubs were due to be promoted from each division; Hapoel Ra'anana and Hapoel Nazareth Illit from the north and Hapoel Dimona and Hapoel Ramat Gan from the south.

During the summer of 1999, Maccabi Jaffa were demoted to Liga Alef (from Liga Leumit) after their budget was not approved by the Israel Football Association, which resulted in Maccabi Sha'arayim (the third-placed club with the highest points total) being promoted alongside the top two from the South Division. In addition, Hapoel Ashdod, Hapoel Lod and SK Nes Tziona were all demoted from Liga Artzit after their budgets were not approved by the IFA. This resulted in the third- and fourth-placed clubs from the North Division (Hapoel Iksal and Hapoel Acre) and the fourth-placed club in the South Division (Shimshon Tel Aviv) also being promoted.

== North Division ==
Pos	Team	Pld	W	D	L	GF	GA	GD	Pts	Promotion or relegation
1	Hapoel Ra'anana	30	18	8	4	71	35	+36	62	Promoted to Liga Artzit
2	Hapoel Nazareth Illit	30	16	10	4	54	27	+27	58	Promoted to Liga Artzit
3	Hapoel Iksal	30	14	7	9	38	32	+6	49	Promoted to Liga Artzit
4	Hapoel Acre	30	12	9	9	47	41	+6	45	Promoted to Liga Artzit
5	Hapoel Majd al-Krum	30	13	5	12	47	42	+5	44	
6	Maccabi Shefa-'Amr	30	13	3	14	40	45	−5	42	
7	Maccabi Afula	30	12	6	12	49	57	−8	42	
8	Maccabi Isfiya	30	11	7	12	45	42	+3	40	
9	Hapoel Migdal HaEmek	30	10	10	10	47	45	+2	40	
10	Hapoel Hadera	30	11	7	12	45	43	+2	40	
11	Maccabi Tamra	30	11	7	12	44	50	−6	40	
12	Hapoel Kiryat Shmona	30	10	9	11	47	43	+4	39	
13	Maccabi Tur'an	30	10	8	12	34	47	−13	38	
14	Hapoel Kafr Kanna	30	10	7	13	50	53	−3	37	
15	Hapoel Umm al-Fahm	30	9	9	12	48	48	0	33 (Note: Three points deducted due to crowd trouble.)	Relegated to Liga Bet
16	Hapoel Kafr Qasim	30	1	6	23	12	68	−56	9	Relegated to Liga Bet

Source: rsssf.com

== South Division ==
Pos	Team	Pld	W	D	L	GF	GA	GD	Pts	Promotion or relegation
1	Hapoel Dimona	30	21	5	4	61	23	+38	68	Promoted to Liga Artzit
2	Hapoel Ramat Gan	30	18	9	3	71	32	+39	63	Promoted to Liga Artzit
3	Maccabi Sha'arayim	30	18	8	4	55	28	+27	62	Promoted to Liga Artzit
4	Shimshon Tel Aviv	30	17	7	6	63	30	+33	58	Promoted to Liga Artzit
5	Maccabi Ashkelon	30	16	6	8	57	32	+25	54	
6	Hapoel Or Yehuda	30	13	7	10	51	47	+4	46	
7	Hapoel Nahlat Yehuda	30	14	2	14	46	49	−3	44	
8	Hapoel Nir Ramat HaSharon	30	10	11	9	34	31	+3	41	
9	Maccabi Ramat Amidar	30	11	7	12	35	41	−6	40	
10	Hapoel Mevaseret Zion	30	10	6	14	45	48	−3	36	
11	Hapoel Kfar Shalem	30	9	8	13	38	40	−2	35	
12	Maccabi Yavne	30	9	8	13	39	50	−11	35	
13	Tzeirei Jaffa	30	10	4	16	45	70	−25	34	
14	Maccabi Lazarus Holon	30	8	7	15	39	61	−22	31	
15	Hapoel Yeruham	30	6	5	19	43	80	−37	23	Relegated to Liga Bet
16	Beitar Ramla	30	0	0	30	0	60	−60	0 (Note: Beitar Ramla withdrew after 15 rounds. Their record was expunged and all results awarded as a 2–0 defeat.)	Relegated to Liga Bet

Source: rsssf.com
