= 1996–97 Liga Alef =

Israeli football season

The 1996–97 Liga Alef season saw Bnei Sakhnin and Hapoel Lod promoted to Liga Artzit as the respective winners of the North and South divisions.

At the bottom, Hapoel Migdal HaEmek, Hapoel Iksal (from North division), Maccabi Shikun HaMizrah and Hapoel Kiryat Malakhi (from South division) were all relegated to Liga Bet.

== North Division ==
Pos	Team	Pld	W	D	L	GF	GA	GD	Pts	Promotion or relegation
1	Bnei Sakhnin	30	21	6	3	67	23	+44	69	Promoted to Liga Artzit
2	Hapoel Acre	30	19	8	3	54	19	+35	65	
3	Hapoel Nazareth Illit	30	20	5	5	52	24	+28	65	
4	Maccabi Ahi Nazareth	30	15	7	8	52	36	+16	52	
5	Hapoel Karmiel	30	15	7	8	57	42	+15	52	
6	Hapoel Umm al-Fahm	30	13	4	13	41	42	−1	43	
7	Hapoel Kafr Kanna	30	10	9	11	37	35	+2	39	
8	Maccabi Shefa-'Amr	30	11	6	13	39	43	−4	39	
9	Maccabi Tamra	30	10	7	13	36	39	−3	37	
10	Maccabi Hadera	30	8	12	10	34	39	−5	36	
11	Hapoel Kafr Qasim	30	9	7	14	26	37	−11	34	
12	Maccabi Isfiya	30	9	6	15	29	47	−18	33	
13	Maccabi Afula	30	7	9	14	26	38	−12	30	
14	Shimshon Tel Aviv	30	8	6	16	37	54	−17	30	
15	Hapoel Migdal HaEmek	30	6	11	13	25	47	−22	29	Relegated to Liga Bet
16	Hapoel Iksal	30	0	8	22	17	64	−47	8	Relegated to Liga Bet

== South Division ==
Pos	Team	Pld	W	D	L	GF	GA	GD	Pts	Promotion or relegation
1	Hapoel Lod	30	18	8	4	63	29	+34	62	Promoted to Liga Artzit
2	Hapoel Ramat HaSharon	30	17	9	4	59	20	+39	60	
3	Hapoel Or Yehuda	30	14	6	10	60	49	+11	48	
4	Hapoel Dimona	30	12	11	7	46	28	+18	47	
5	Beitar Be'er Sheva	30	12	10	8	46	37	+9	46	
6	Maccabi Sha'arayim	30	12	8	10	40	38	+2	44	
7	Hapoel Kiryat Ono	30	11	8	11	32	30	+2	41	
8	Hapoel Yehud	30	8	12	10	31	32	−1	36	
9	Hapoel Kfar Shalem	30	8	12	10	35	37	−2	36	
10	Beitar Ramla	30	10	6	14	31	39	−8	36	
11	Hapoel Yeruham	30	9	8	13	33	67	−34	35	
12	Maccabi Lazarus Holon	30	8	10	12	44	40	+4	34	
13	Maccabi Ramat Amidar	30	6	16	8	27	30	−3	34	
14	Tzeirei Jaffa	30	8	9	13	33	46	−13	33	
15	Maccabi Shikun HaMizrah	30	7	11	12	33	46	−13	32	Relegated to Liga Bet
16	Hapoel Kiryat Malakhi	30	3	10	17	25	70	−45	19	Relegated to Liga Bet
