= 1989–90 Liga Alef =

Israeli football season

The 1989–90 Liga Alef season saw Maccabi Acre and Hapoel Ashdod promoted to Liga Artzit as the respective winners of the north and south division. They were joined by Ironi Ashdod who won the promotion/relegation play-offs.

Hapoel Bnei Nazareth, Beitar Haifa, Hapoel Or Yehuda and Hapoel Dimona were all relegated to Liga Bet.

== North Division ==
Pos	Team	Pld	W	D	L	GF	GA	GD	Pts	Promotion or relegation
1	Maccabi Acre	30	16	12	2	41	20	+21	44	Promoted to Liga Artzit
2	Hapoel Daliyat al-Karmel	30	15	11	4	38	18	+20	41	Promotion play-offs
3	Maccabi Herzliya	30	14	11	5	38	16	+22	39	
4	Maccabi Afula	30	11	10	9	35	29	+6	32	
5	Hapoel Acre	30	10	12	8	32	30	+2	32	
6	Hapoel Beit She'an	30	8	13	9	29	30	−1	29	
7	Hapoel Kiryat Shmona	30	9	11	10	23	26	−3	29	
8	Maccabi Ahi Nazareth	30	8	11	11	33	34	−1	27	
9	Hapoel Tayibe	30	5	17	8	24	30	−6	27	
10	Maccabi Hadera	30	6	15	9	22	28	−6	27	
11	Hapoel Umm al-Fahm	30	9	9	12	32	42	−10	27	
12	Beitar Nahariya	30	8	10	12	27	31	−4	26	
13	Maccabi Bnei Hatzor	30	7	12	11	29	38	−9	26	
14	Maccabi Isfiya	30	9	8	13	31	45	−14	26	
15	Hapoel Bnei Nazareth	30	8	9	13	29	33	−4	25	Relegated to Liga Bet
16	Beitar Haifa	30	5	13	12	23	36	−13	23	Relegated to Liga Bet

The division's top scorer was Hisham Zuabi of Hapoel Daliyat al-Karmel with 15 goals.

== South Division ==
Pos	Team	Pld	W	D	L	GF	GA	GD	Pts	Promotion or relegation
1	Hapoel Ashdod	30	14	13	3	41	21	+20	41	Promoted to Liga Artzit
2	Ironi Ashdod	30	17	6	7	41	21	+20	40	Promotion play-offs
3	Hakoah Ramat Gan	30	15	10	5	39	22	+17	40	
4	Maccabi Lazarus Holon	30	14	10	6	32	21	+11	38	
5	Hapoel Kiryat Ono	30	12	10	8	36	29	+7	34	
6	Hapoel Yehud	30	10	11	9	30	22	+8	31	
7	Beitar Ramla	30	10	13	7	34	29	+5	29 (Note: Four points deducted)	
8	Hapoel Marmorek	30	9	11	10	35	38	−3	29	
9	Hapoel Kfar Shalem	30	7	12	11	30	34	−4	26	
10	Hapoel Ashkelon	30	8	10	12	21	29	−8	26	
11	Hapoel Kiryat Malakhi	30	6	14	10	23	32	−9	26	
12	Maccabi Kiryat Gat	30	6	13	11	22	26	−4	25	
13	Maccabi Shikun HaMizrah	30	8	9	13	25	35	−10	25	
14	Hapoel Be'er Ya'akov	30	8	9	13	24	34	−10	25	
15	Hapoel Or Yehuda	30	5	15	10	23	37	−14	25	Relegated to Liga Bet
16	Hapoel Dimona	30	5	6	19	19	45	−26	16	Relegated to Liga Bet

Notes:

The division's top scorer was Naor Galili of Ironi Ashdod with 15 goals.

== Promotion/relegation play-offs ==
The two second-placed clubs (Hapoel Daliyat al-Karmel and Ironi Ashdod) played off to face the 14th-placed club from Liga Artzit (Maccabi Tamra). Ironi Ashdod won both matches and were promoted, whilst Tamra were relegated to Liga Alef.

=== First round ===
20 May 1990

Ironi Ashdod	2–1	Hapoel Daliyat al-Karmel
Ben Mamas 17'; Aflalo 62'		Zuabi 19'

HaKufsa
Attendance: 6500
Referee: Ovadia Tzvi

=== Second round ===
24 May 1990

Ironi Ashdod	1–0 (a.e.t.)	Maccabi Tamra
Zrihen 110'

Levita Stadium
Attendance: 5000
