= 1994–95 Liga Bet =

Israeli football season

The 1994–95 Liga Bet season saw Maccabi Kafr Kanna, Hapoel Migdal HaEmek, Hapoel Kafr Qasim and Shikin HaMizrah win their regional divisions and promoted to Liga Alef.

At the bottom, Maccabi Nahariya, Hapoel Bnei Acre (from North A division), Hapoel Qalansawe, Hapoel Tel Hanan (from North B division), Beitar Petah Tikva, Hapoel Jaljulia, Maccabi HaShikma Ramat Hen (from South A division), Hapoel Arad and Maccabi Kiryat Malakhi (from South B division) were all automatically Relegated to Liga Gimel.

== North A division ==
Pos	Team	Pld	W	D	L	GF	GA	GD	Pts	Promotion or relegation
1	Maccabi Kafr Kanna	28	–	–	–	69	27	+42	45	Promoted to Liga Alef
2	Hapoel Bnei Nazareth	28	–	–	–	69	38	+31	36	
3	Hapoel Arraba	28	–	–	–	52	35	+17	34 (Note: 1 point deducted.)	
4	Hapoel Tuba	28	–	–	–	47	35	+12	32	
5	Hapoel Karmiel	28	–	–	–	42	30	+12	32	
6	Hapoel Bu'eine	28	–	–	–	32	24	+8	30	
7	Hapoel Kafr Sumei	28	–	–	–	40	34	+6	28	
8	Hapoel Majd al-Krum	28	–	–	–	40	39	+1	28	
9	Maccabi Sektzia Ma'alot-Tarshiha	28	–	–	–	31	34	−3	27	
10	Hapoel Kiryat Ata	28	–	–	–	30	28	+2	26	
11	Hapoel Deir Hanna	28	–	–	–	32	52	−20	26	
12	Maccabi Tiberias	28	–	–	–	39	48	−9	24	
13	Hapoel Safed	28	–	–	–	26	40	−14	22	
14	Maccabi Nahariya	28	–	–	–	41	69	−28	17	Relegated to Liga Gimel
15	Hapoel Bnei Acre	28	–	–	–	26	80	−54	11	Relegated to Liga Gimel

== North B division ==
Pos	Team	Pld	W	D	L	GF	GA	GD	Pts	Promotion or relegation
1	Hapoel Migdal HaEmek	30	–	–	–	49	22	+27	44	Promoted to Liga Alef
2	Hapoel Nahliel	30	–	–	–	56	29	+27	39	
3	Beitar Kfar Yona	30	–	–	–	56	37	+19	37	
4	Hapoel Bir al-Maksur	30	–	–	–	44	29	+15	37 (Note: 1 point deducted.)	
5	Hapoel Arab Nujeidat	30	–	–	–	52	38	+14	32	
6	Maccabi Tzur Shalom	30	–	–	–	35	29	+6	32	
7	Ironi Sayid Umm al-Fahm	30	–	–	–	38	34	+4	31	
8	Hapoel Kafr Qara	30	–	–	–	39	32	+7	30	
9	Maccabi Umm al-Fahm	30	–	–	–	37	39	−2	29 (Note: 2 points deducted.)	
10	Hapoel Arara	30	–	–	–	37	41	−4	29	
11	Hapoel Fureidis	30	–	–	–	43	44	−1	28	
12	Hapoel Iksal	30	–	–	–	36	39	−3	28	
13	Hapoel Yafa	30	–	–	–	30	36	−6	28	
14	Hapoel Reineh	30	–	–	–	30	42	−12	26	
15	Hapoel Qalansawe	30	–	–	–	27	52	−25	14	Relegated to Liga Gimel
16	Hapoel Tel Hanan	30	–	–	–	19	84	−65	10	Relegated to Liga Gimel

== South A division ==
Pos	Team	Pld	W	D	L	GF	GA	GD	Pts	Promotion or relegation
1	Hapoel Kafr Qasim	30	–	–	–	63	29	+34	48	Promoted to Liga Alef
2	Hapoel Azor	30	–	–	–	56	26	+30	42	
3	Hapoel Herzliya	30	–	–	–	43	29	+14	36	
4	Hapoel Nahlat Yehuda	30	–	–	–	46	40	+6	34	
5	Hapoel Aliyah Kfar Saba	30	–	–	–	56	48	+8	33	
6	Hapoel Tira	30	–	–	–	42	41	+1	32	
7	Hapoel Mahane Yehuda	30	–	–	–	38	34	+4	31	
8	Maccabi Bat Yam	30	–	–	–	38	33	+5	28	
9	Beitar Holon	30	–	–	–	35	41	−6	28	
10	Beitar Beit Dagan	30	–	–	–	46	55	−9	28	
11	Hapoel Ramat HaSharon	30	–	–	–	28	29	−1	27	
12	M.M. Givat Shmuel	30	–	–	–	42	40	+2	26	
13	Maccabi Kafr Qasim	30	–	–	–	32	48	−16	26	
14	Beitar Petah Tikva	30	–	–	–	32	55	−23	22	Relegated to Liga Gimel
15	Hapoel Jaljulia	30	–	–	–	33	60	−27	20	Relegated to Liga Gimel
16	Maccabi HaShikma Ramat Hen	30	–	–	–	26	48	−22	19	Relegated to Liga Gimel

== South B division ==
Pos	Team	Pld	W	D	L	GF	GA	GD	Pts	Promotion or relegation
1	Maccabi Shikun HaMizrah	28	–	–	–	88	18	+70	49	Promoted to Liga Alef
2	Hapoel Eilat	28	–	–	–	79	18	+61	48	
3	Beitar Beit Shemesh	28	–	–	–	59	26	+33	42	
4	Hapoel Dimona	28	–	–	–	51	33	+18	30	
5	Maccabi Ben Zvi	28	–	–	–	55	39	+16	29	
6	A.S. Ramat Eliyahu	28	–	–	–	32	28	+4	29	
7	Hapoel Mevaseret Zion	28	–	–	–	50	43	+7	26	
8	Maccabi Ramla	28	–	–	–	33	45	−12	26	
9	Maccabi Ashkelon	28	–	–	–	27	33	−6	25	
10	Beitar Lod	28	–	–	–	39	43	−4	24	
11	Beitar Ashdod	28	–	–	–	37	49	−12	23	
12	Maccabi Rehovot	28	–	–	–	32	48	−16	23	
13	Beitar Yavne	28	–	–	–	32	49	−17	23	
14	Hapoel Arad	28	–	–	–	46	54	−8	22	Relegated to Liga Gimel
15	Maccabi Kiryat Malakhi	28	0	1	27	16	148	−132	1	Relegated to Liga Gimel
–	Maccabi Dimona	0	0	0	0	0	0	0	0	
