= 1992–93 Liga Alef =

Israeli football season

The 1992–93 Liga Alef season saw Hapoel Beit She'an (champions of the North Division) and Hapoel Rishon LeZion (champions of the South Division) win their regional divisions and promotion to Liga Artzit, along with runners-up Hapoel Tayibe and Hapoel Bat Yam.

At the bottom, Maccabi Bnei Hatzor (from the North division) and Beitar Netanya (from the South division) finished bottom and relegated to Liga Bet.

== North Division ==
| Pos | Team | Pld | W | D | L | GF | GA | GD | Pts | Qualification or relegation |
|---|---|---|---|---|---|---|---|---|---|---|
| 1 | Hapoel Beit She'an | 30 | 19 | 7 | 4 | 44 | 18 | +26 | 45 | Promoted to Liga Artzit |
| 2 | Hapoel Tayibe | 30 | 18 | 8 | 4 | 47 | 24 | +23 | 44 | Promoted to Liga Artzit |
| 3 | Hapoel Givat Olga | 30 | 16 | 8 | 6 | 41 | 21 | +20 | 40 | |
| 4 | Beitar Nahariya | 30 | 14 | 10 | 6 | 45 | 32 | +13 | 38 | |
| 5 | Hapoel Kiryat Shmona | 30 | 12 | 8 | 10 | 37 | 31 | +6 | 32 | |
| 6 | Hapoel Acre | 30 | 12 | 8 | 10 | 43 | 39 | +4 | 32 | |
| 7 | Maccabi Hadera | 30 | 11 | 8 | 11 | 38 | 39 | −1 | 30 | |
| 8 | Hapoel Umm al-Fahm | 30 | 12 | 5 | 13 | 50 | 40 | +10 | 29 | |
| 9 | Maccabi Afula | 30 | 11 | 6 | 13 | 43 | 49 | −6 | 28 | |
| 10 | Hapoel Tiberias | 30 | 10 | 7 | 13 | 50 | 43 | +7 | 27 | |
| 11 | Maccabi Ahi Nazareth | 30 | 9 | 7 | 14 | 45 | 50 | −5 | 25 | |
| 12 | Hapoel Nazareth Illit | 30 | 8 | 8 | 14 | 32 | 40 | −8 | 24 | |
| 13 | Maccabi Or Akiva | 30 | 8 | 7 | 15 | 37 | 46 | −9 | 23 | |
| 14 | Maccabi Isfiya | 30 | 7 | 8 | 15 | 28 | 42 | −14 | 22 | |
| 15 | Hapoel Tirat HaCarmel | 30 | 7 | 7 | 16 | 34 | 56 | −22 | 21 | |
| 16 | Maccabi Bnei Hatzor | 30 | 5 | 10 | 15 | 18 | 42 | −24 | 20 | Relegated to Liga Bet |

Updated to match(es) played on May 1993. Source: Yedioth Ahronoth (in Hebrew)

== South Division ==
| Pos | Team | Pld | W | D | L | GF | GA | GD | Pts | Qualification or relegation |
|---|---|---|---|---|---|---|---|---|---|---|
| 1 | Hapoel Rishon LeZion | 30 | 24 | 4 | 2 | 85 | 20 | +65 | 52 | Promoted to Liga Artzit |
| 2 | Hapoel Bat Yam | 30 | 19 | 10 | 1 | 63 | 20 | +43 | 48 | Promoted to Liga Artzit |
| 3 | Hapoel Kiryat Ono | 30 | 20 | 6 | 4 | 54 | 33 | +21 | 46 | |
| 4 | Beitar Be'er Sheva | 30 | 18 | 6 | 6 | 61 | 30 | +31 | 42 | |
| 5 | Maccabi Kiryat Gat | 30 | 13 | 8 | 9 | 37 | 31 | +6 | 34 | |
| 6 | Maccabi Ramat Amidar | 30 | 11 | 7 | 12 | 35 | 36 | −1 | 29 | |
| 7 | Beitar Ramla | 30 | 11 | 12 | 7 | 32 | 27 | +5 | 34 | |
| 8 | Hapoel Kfar Shalem | 30 | 10 | 8 | 12 | 51 | 49 | +2 | 28 | |
| 9 | Hapoel Ihud Tzeirei Jaffa | 30 | 12 | 4 | 14 | 36 | 43 | −7 | 28 | |
| 10 | Hapoel Yeruham | 30 | 10 | 4 | 16 | 41 | 44 | −3 | 24 | |
| 11 | Hapoel Kiryat Malakhi | 30 | 8 | 7 | 15 | 26 | 44 | −18 | 23 | |
| 12 | Maccabi HaShikma Ramat Hen | 30 | 8 | 6 | 16 | 32 | 65 | −33 | 22 | |
| 13 | Hapoel Marmorek | 30 | 5 | 11 | 14 | 22 | 42 | −20 | 21 | |
| 14 | Maccabi Lazaros Holon | 30 | 5 | 10 | 15 | 27 | 41 | −14 | 20 | |
| 15 | Hapoel Be'er Ya'akov | 30 | 5 | 7 | 18 | 24 | 59 | −35 | 17 | |
| 16 | Beitar Netanya | 30 | 2 | 8 | 20 | 12 | 54 | −42 | 12 | Relegated to Liga Bet |

Updated to match(es) played on May 1993. Source: Yedioth Ahronoth (in Hebrew)
