= 1980–81 Liga Alef =

Israeli football season

The 1980–81 Liga Alef season saw Beitar Netanya (champions of the North Division) and Maccabi Kiryat Gat (champions of the South Division) win the title and promotion to Liga Artzit. Hapoel Tel Hanan also promoted after promotion play-offs.

== North Division ==
| Pos | Team | Pld | W | D | L | GF | GA | GD | Pts | Promotion or relegation |
|---|---|---|---|---|---|---|---|---|---|---|
| 1 | Beitar Netanya | 26 | – | – | – | 39 | 21 | +18 | 39 | Promoted to Liga Artzit |
| 2 | Hapoel Tel Hanan | 26 | – | – | – | 46 | 25 | +21 | 36 | Promotion play-offs |
| 3 | Maccabi Hadera | 26 | – | – | – | 42 | 26 | +16 | 35 | |
| 4 | Hapoel Kiryat Ata | 26 | – | – | – | 30 | 23 | +7 | 30 | |
| 5 | Hapoel Ramat HaSharon | 26 | – | – | – | 49 | 32 | +17 | 29 | |
| 6 | Hapoel Bnei Nazareth | 26 | – | – | – | 33 | 27 | +6 | 28 | |
| 7 | Hapoel Tirat HaCarmel | 26 | – | – | – | 32 | 41 | −9 | 24 | |
| 8 | Hapoel Givat Olga | 26 | – | – | – | 17 | 31 | −14 | 23 | |
| 9 | Maccabi Shefa-'Amr | 26 | – | – | – | 34 | 38 | −4 | 22 | |
| 10 | Hapoel Ra'anana | 26 | – | – | – | 16 | 28 | −12 | 22 | |
| 11 | Hapoel Afikim | 26 | – | – | – | 27 | 48 | −21 | 22 | |
| 12 | Hapoel Nahariya | 26 | – | – | – | 28 | 31 | −3 | 21 | |
| 13 | Hapoel Netanya (Note: Hapoel Netanya demoted to Liga Bet, due to riot in their last match of the season against Hapoel Nahariya, which abandoned in the 45th minute at 1-1.) | 26 | – | – | – | 24 | 29 | −5 | 20 (Note: 2 points deducted) | Relegated to Liga Bet |
| 14 | Maccabi Or Akiva | 26 | – | – | – | 33 | 56 | −23 | 14 | Relegated to Liga Bet |

== South Division ==
| Pos | Team | Pld | W | D | L | GF | GA | GD | Pts | Promotion or relegation |
|---|---|---|---|---|---|---|---|---|---|---|
| 1 | Maccabi Kiryat Gat | 26 | – | – | – | 35 | 15 | +20 | 40 | Promoted to Liga Artzit |
| 2 | Hapoel Ramla | 26 | – | – | – | 35 | 20 | +15 | 35 | Promotion play-offs |
| 3 | Hapoel Ashdod | 26 | – | – | – | 22 | 19 | +3 | 31 | |
| 4 | Hapoel Bat Yam | 26 | – | – | – | 30 | 27 | +3 | 29 | |
| 5 | Hapoel Dimona | 26 | – | – | – | 31 | 24 | +7 | 28 | |
| 6 | Maccabi Lazarus Holon | 26 | – | – | – | 18 | 22 | −4 | 25 | |
| 7 | Beitar Be'er Sheva | 26 | – | – | – | 24 | 22 | +2 | 24 | |
| 8 | Hapoel Kiryat Ono | 26 | – | – | – | 21 | 29 | −8 | 24 | |
| 9 | Hapoel Herzliya | 26 | – | – | – | 29 | 30 | −1 | 22 | |
| 10 | Hapoel Marmorek | 26 | – | – | – | 29 | 33 | −4 | 22 | |
| 11 | Hapoel Ashkelon | 26 | – | – | – | 21 | 26 | −5 | 22 | |
| 12 | Maccabi Sha'arayim | 26 | – | – | – | 18 | 29 | −11 | 22 | |
| 13 | Maccabi Be'er Sheva | 26 | – | – | – | 23 | 29 | −6 | 21 | Relegated to Liga Bet |
| 14 | Hapoel Rosh HaAyin | 26 | – | – | – | 22 | 38 | −16 | 18 | Relegated to Liga Bet |

== Promotion play-offs ==
16.5.1981

| Hapoel Tel Hanan | 0 – 0 | Hapoel Ramla |

23.5.1981

| Hapoel Ramla | 1 – 1 (a.e.t.) 4-5 (pen.) | Hapoel Tel Hanan |

Hapoel Tel Hanan promoted to Liga Artzit.
