= 1992–93 Liga Artzit =

The 1992–93 Liga Artzit season saw Maccabi Herzliya, Ironi Ashdod and Hapoel Kfar Saba promoted to Liga Leumit, the former two for the first time in their histories. Hapoel Ramat Gan and Maccabi Sha'arayim were relegated to Liga Alef. Maccabi Jaffa, who finished fourth, missed out on promotion after losing a play-off with top flight club Hapoel Petah Tikva.

== Final table ==
Pos	Team	Pld	W	D	L	GF	GA	GD	Pts	Promotion or relegation
1	Maccabi Herzliya	30	18	8	4	47	21	+26	62	Promoted to Liga Leumit
2	Ironi Ashdod	30	19	4	7	64	31	+33	61	Promoted to Liga Leumit
3	Hapoel Kfar Saba	30	15	9	6	49	27	+22	54	Promoted to Liga Leumit
4	Maccabi Jaffa	30	12	10	8	38	31	+7	46	Play-off
5	Hapoel Ashkelon	30	10	11	9	34	34	0	41	
6	Hakoah Ramat Gan	30	9	12	9	41	36	+5	39	
7	Maccabi Acre	30	9	10	11	35	41	−6	37	
8	Hapoel Jerusalem	30	10	7	13	29	38	−9	37	
9	Hapoel Ashdod	30	9	10	11	27	36	−9	37	
10	Maccabi Yavne	30	11	4	15	31	41	−10	37	
11	SK Nes-Tziona	30	9	9	12	40	47	−7	36	
12	Hapoel Daliyat al-Karmel	30	8	12	10	30	37	−7	36	
13	Shimshon Tel Aviv	30	9	9	12	32	40	−8	36	
14	Hapoel Hadera	30	8	11	11	29	35	−6	35	
15	Hapoel Ramat Gan	30	8	10	12	34	39	−5	34	Relegated to Liga Alef
16	Maccabi Sha'arayim	30	6	4	20	27	53	−26	22	Relegated to Liga Alef

== Promotion-relegation play-offs ==
Fourth-placed Maccabi Jaffa played-off against Hapoel Petah Tikva, who had finished eleventh in Liga Leumit. Hapoel won both legs to remain in the top division.

Maccabi Jaffa	0 – 3	Hapoel Petah Tikva

Gaon Stadium, Tel Aviv

Hapoel Petah Tikva	2 – 1	Maccabi Jaffa

Municipal Stadium, Petah Tikva
