= 1995–96 Liga Artzit =

The 1995–96 Liga Artzit season saw Hapoel Tayibe win the title and become the first ever Arab club to be promoted to the top division. Hapoel Jerusalem were also promoted.

At the other end of the table, Shimshon Tel Aviv and Hapoel Kfar Shalem were relegated to Liga Alef.

== Final table ==
Pos	Team	Pld	W	D	L	GF	GA	GD	Pts	Promotion or relegation
1	Hapoel Tayibe	30	18	4	8	40	31	+9	58	Promoted to Liga Leumit
2	Hapoel Jerusalem	30	15	9	6	43	24	+19	54	Promoted to Liga Leumit
3	Hapoel Bat Yam	30	10	13	7	38	31	+7	43	
4	Maccabi Kiryat Gat	30	12	6	12	33	34	−1	42	
5	Ironi Ashdod	30	10	10	10	43	34	+9	40	
6	Hapoel Ramat Gan	30	10	10	10	34	32	+2	40	
7	Hakoah Ramat Gan	30	11	7	12	36	36	0	40	
8	Maccabi Acre	30	9	13	8	36	37	−1	40	
9	Maccabi Netanya	30	9	12	9	38	28	+10	39	
10	Hapoel Ashdod	30	10	9	11	42	41	+1	39	
11	Maccabi Yavne	30	9	12	9	26	28	−2	39	
12	Hapoel Hadera	30	10	8	12	30	38	−8	38	
13	SK Nes Tziona	30	10	8	12	35	44	−9	38	
14	Hapoel Kiryat Shmona	30	8	13	9	32	38	−6	37	
15	Shimshon Tel Aviv	30	9	9	12	39	44	−5	36	Relegated to Liga Alef
16	Hapoel Kfar Shalem	30	4	9	17	19	44	−25	21	Relegated to Liga Alef

Source: rsssf.com
