= 2024–25 Liga Alef =

Liga Alef
- Season: 2024–25

The 2024–25 Liga Alef season is the 15th season as third tier since its re-alignment in 2009 and the 82nd season of third-tier football in Israel.

== Liga Alef North ==
=== League table ===
| Pos | Team | Pld | W | D | L | GF | GA | GD | Pts | Qualification or relegation |
|---|---|---|---|---|---|---|---|---|---|---|
| 1 | Hapoel Kiryat Yam | 19 | 15 | 3 | 1 | 51 | 8 | +43 | 48 | Promotion to Liga Leumit |
| 2 | Hapoel Migdal HaEmek | 19 | 12 | 5 | 2 | 47 | 17 | +30 | 41 | Promotion Playoffs |
| 3 | Tira | 19 | 11 | 4 | 4 | 35 | 24 | +11 | 37 | Promotion Playoffs |
| 4 | Hapoel Ironi Baqa al-Gharbiyye | 20 | 7 | 9 | 4 | 27 | 23 | +4 | 30 | Promotion Playoffs |
| 5 | Hapoel Bnei Musmus | 19 | 7 | 7 | 5 | 30 | 25 | +5 | 28 | Promotion Playoffs |
| 6 | Hapoel Bnei Zalafa | 20 | 8 | 4 | 8 | 26 | 34 | −8 | 28 | |
| 7 | Maccabi Ironi Kiryat Ata | 19 | 7 | 6 | 6 | 32 | 22 | +10 | 27 | |
| 8 | Maccabi Umm al-Fahm | 18 | 9 | 6 | 3 | 35 | 20 | +15 | 25 (Note: Maccabi Umm al-Fahm were deducted Eight points.) | |
| 9 | Hapoel Bnei Araba | 19 | 7 | 4 | 8 | 21 | 24 | −3 | 25 | |
| 10 | Hapoel Beit She'an | 19 | 6 | 5 | 8 | 30 | 31 | −1 | 23 | |
| 11 | Ironi Nesher | 20 | 5 | 7 | 8 | 16 | 21 | −5 | 22 | |
| 12 | Hapoel Bu'eine | 19 | 4 | 9 | 6 | 19 | 23 | −4 | 21 | |
| 13 | Hapoel Kafr Kanna | 19 | 4 | 6 | 9 | 15 | 31 | −16 | 18 | |
| 14 | Maccabi Akhi Nazareth | 20 | 4 | 4 | 12 | 20 | 47 | −27 | 16 | |
| 15 | Maccabi Nujeidat | 20 | 2 | 7 | 11 | 10 | 38 | −28 | 13 | Relegation to Liga Bet |
| 16 | Maccabi Kafr Kanna | 19 | 1 | 4 | 14 | 16 | 42 | −26 | 7 | Relegation to Liga Bet |
| 17 | Ihud Bnei Shefa-'Amr | 0 | 0 | 0 | 0 | 0 | 0 | 0 | 0 | Relegation to Liga Bet |

Updated to match(es) played on 21 February 2025. Source: Soccerway
Rules for classification: 1) points; 2) goal difference; 3) number of wins; 4) goals scored; 5) head to head; 6)deciding match.

=== Results ===
| Home \ Away | HBA | HBS | HBM | HBZ | HBU | HIB | HKK | HKY | HMH | IBS | INE | MAN | MKA | MKK | MNU | MUF | TIR |
|---|---|---|---|---|---|---|---|---|---|---|---|---|---|---|---|---|---|
| Hapoel Bnei Araba | — | | | | | | | | | | | | | | | | |
| Hapoel Beit She'an | | — | 2–2 | | | | | | | | 3–0 | | | | | | |
| Hapoel Bnei Musmus | | | — | | | | | | | | | | | | | | |
| Hapoel Bnei Zalafa | | | | — | | | | | | | | | | | | | 0–2 |
| Hapoel Bu'eine | | | | | — | | | | | | | 4–1 | | | | | |
| Hapoel Ironi Baqa al-Gharbiyye | | | | | | — | | | | 1–1 | | | | | 2–0 | | |
| Hapoel Kafr Kanna | | | | | | | — | | | | | | | | 1–1 | | |
| Hapoel Kiryat Yam | | | | | | | | — | | 7–0 | 2–0 | | | | | | |
| Hapoel Migdal HaEmek | 2–0 | | | | | | | | — | | | 5–0 | | | | | |
| Ihud Bnei Shefa-'Amr | | | | | | | | | | — | | | | | | | |
| Ironi Nesher | | | | | 2–1 | | | | | | — | | | | | | |
| Maccabi Akhi Nazareth | | | | | | | | | | | | — | | | | | |
| Maccabi Ironi Kiryat Ata | | | | | | | | | | | | | — | | | | |
| Maccabi Kafr Kanna | | | 1–3 | | | | | | | | | | | — | | | |
| Maccabi Nujeidat | | | | | | | | | | | | | | | — | | |
| Maccabi Umm al-Fahm | | | | | | | 2–2 | | | | | | | | | — | 1–1 |
| Tira | | | | | | | | | | | | | | | | | — |

Updated to match(es) played on 22 November 2024. Source: Soccerway
Legend: Blue = home team win; Red = away team win.

== Liga Alef South ==
=== League table ===
| Pos | Team | Pld | W | D | L | GF | GA | GD | Pts | Qualification or relegation |
|---|---|---|---|---|---|---|---|---|---|---|
| 1 | Ironi Modi'in (C, P) | 30 | 18 | 8 | 4 | 45 | 19 | +26 | 62 | Promotion to Liga Leumit |
| 2 | Nordia Jerusalem | 30 | 17 | 5 | 8 | 50 | 34 | +16 | 56 | Promotion Playoffs |
| 3 | Hapoel Herzliya | 30 | 16 | 7 | 7 | 46 | 32 | +14 | 55 | Promotion Playoffs |
| 4 | Maccabi Yavne | 30 | 16 | 6 | 8 | 44 | 33 | +11 | 54 | Promotion Playoffs |
| 5 | Dimona | 30 | 15 | 6 | 9 | 43 | 29 | +14 | 51 | Promotion Playoffs |
| 6 | Holon Yermiyahu | 30 | 12 | 11 | 7 | 42 | 29 | +13 | 47 | |
| 7 | Jerusalem | 30 | 12 | 9 | 9 | 47 | 41 | +6 | 45 | |
| 8 | Maccabi Ironi Ashdod | 30 | 10 | 10 | 10 | 35 | 31 | +4 | 40 | |
| 9 | Hapoel Ashdod | 30 | 10 | 8 | 12 | 44 | 35 | +9 | 38 | |
| 10 | Shimshon Tel Aviv | 30 | 9 | 11 | 10 | 33 | 34 | −1 | 38 | |
| 11 | Hapoel Marmorek | 30 | 6 | 12 | 12 | 29 | 38 | −9 | 30 | |
| 12 | Maccabi Kiryat Malakhi | 30 | 6 | 12 | 12 | 22 | 35 | −13 | 30 | |
| 13 | Hapoel Azor | 30 | 7 | 9 | 14 | 28 | 48 | −20 | 30 | |
| 14 | Tzeirei Tira | 30 | 7 | 8 | 15 | 24 | 44 | −20 | 29 | |
| 15 | Hapoel Lod (R) | 30 | 8 | 5 | 17 | 30 | 58 | −28 | 29 | Relegation to Liga Bet |
| 16 | Maccabi Sha'arayim (R) | 30 | 3 | 9 | 18 | 24 | 46 | −22 | 18 | Relegation to Liga Bet |
| 17 | Shimshon Kafr Qasim | 0 | 0 | 0 | 0 | 0 | 0 | 0 | 0 | Relegation to Liga Bet |

Source: Soccerway
Rules for classification: 1) points; 2) goal difference; 3) number of wins; 4) goals scored; 5) head to head; 6)deciding match.
(C) Champions; (P) Promoted; (R) Relegated

=== Results ===
| Home \ Away | DIM | HAS | HAZ | HHE | HLO | HMA | HLY | IRM | JER | MIA | MKM | MSH | MYA | NJE | SKQ | STA | TZT |
|---|---|---|---|---|---|---|---|---|---|---|---|---|---|---|---|---|---|
| Dimona | — | | | | | | | | | | | | 1–1 | | | | |
| Hapoel Ashdod | | — | | | | | 1–1 | | | | | | | | | | |
| Hapoel Azor | | | — | | | | | | | | | 1–0 | | | | | |
| Hapoel Herzliya | | | | — | | | | | | | | | | | | | |
| Hapoel Lod | | | | | — | | | | | | 2–1 | | | | | | |
| Hapoel Marmorek | | | | 1–2 | | — | | | | | | | | | | | |
| Holon Yermiyahu | | | | | | | — | | | | | | | | | | |
| Ironi Modi'in | | | | | | | | — | | | | | | | | | |
| Jerusalem | | | | | | | | | — | | | | | | | | |
| Maccabi Ironi Ashdod | | | | | | | | | | — | | | | | | | |
| Maccabi Kiryat Malakhi | | | | | | | | | | | — | | | | | | |
| Maccabi Sha'arayim | | | | | | | | | | | | — | | | | | |
| Maccabi Yavne | | | | | | 4–4 | | | | | | | — | | | | |
| Nordia Jerusalem | | | | | | | | | | | | | | — | 1–0 | | |
| Shimshon Kafr Qasim | | | | | | | | | | | | | | | — | | |
| Shimshon Tel Aviv | | | | | | | | 0–1 | | | | | | | | — | |
| Tzeirei Tira | | | | | | | | | 1–7 | | | | | | | | — |

Updated to match(es) played on 12 September 2024. Source: Soccerway
Legend: Blue = home team win; Red = away team win.
