= 1972–73 Liga Alef =

Israeli football season

The 1972–73 Liga Alef season saw Hapoel Hadera (champions of the North Division) and Bnei Yehuda (champions of the South Division) promoted to Liga Leumit.

== North Division ==
Pos	Team	Pld	W	D	L	GF	GA	GD	Pts	Promotion or relegation
1	Hapoel Hadera	30	19	8	3	59	18	+41	46	Promoted to Liga Leumit
2	Hapoel Acre	30	17	11	2	46	23	+23	45	
3	Hapoel Ramat Gan	30	15	6	9	49	34	+15	36	
4	Hapoel Tirat HaCarmel	30	13	10	7	45	32	+13	36	
5	Maccabi Herzliya	30	13	6	11	36	30	+6	32	
6	Hapoel Tiberias	30	10	10	10	37	30	+7	30	
7	Hapoel Herzliya	30	8	12	10	34	35	−1	28	
8	Beitar Netanya	30	8	11	11	36	31	+5	27	
9	Hapoel Nahliel	30	10	7	13	29	35	−6	27	
10	Hapoel Kiryat Shmona	30	8	11	11	30	51	−21	27	
11	Hapoel Safed	30	10	6	14	39	59	−20	26	
12	Hapoel Nahariya	30	7	11	12	29	33	−4	25	
13	Hapoel Bnei Nazareth	30	8	9	13	34	43	−9	25	
14	Hapoel Migdal HaEmek	30	9	7	14	32	51	−19	25	
15	Hapoel Mahane Yehuda	30	6	12	12	28	39	−11	24	Relegated to Liga Bet
16	Hapoel Givat Haim	30	8	5	17	31	50	−19	21	Relegated to Liga Bet

== South Division ==
Pos	Team	Pld	W	D	L	GF	GA	GD	Pts	Promotion or relegation
1	Bnei Yehuda	30	21	7	2	59	23	+36	49	Promoted to Liga Leumit
2	Hapoel Holon	30	16	7	7	45	29	+16	39	
3	Maccabi Sha'arayim	30	14	7	9	47	37	+10	35	
4	Hapoel Yehud	30	14	7	9	44	38	+6	35	
5	Hapoel Dimona	30	13	5	12	41	39	+2	31	
6	Hapoel Ashdod	30	13	5	12	40	38	+2	31	
7	Hapoel Rishon LeZion	30	14	2	14	52	53	−1	30	
8	Beitar Ramla	30	10	10	10	37	41	−4	30	
9	Hapoel Be'er Ya'akov	30	11	7	12	45	43	+2	29	
10	Maccabi Ramat Amidar	30	11	7	12	48	47	+1	29	
11	Hapoel Ramla	30	8	12	10	40	30	+10	28	
12	Hapoel Bat Yam	30	10	7	13	38	42	−4	27	
13	Hapoel Lod	30	10	6	14	40	46	−6	26	
14	Hapoel Beit Shemesh	30	8	10	12	35	44	−9	24 (Note: 2 points deducted)	
15	Hapoel Eilat	30	7	6	17	30	45	−15	20	Relegated to Liga Bet
16	Hapoel Kiryat Ono	30	3	9	18	24	51	−27	15	Relegated to Liga Bet
