= 1993–94 Liga Artzit =

The 1993–94 Liga Artzit season saw Ironi Rishon LeZion, Hapoel Beit She'an (for the first time in their history) and Beitar Tel Aviv promoted to Liga Leumit. Shimshon Tel Aviv, who finished fourth, missed out on promotion after losing a play-off with top flight club Hapoel Haifa.

At the other end of the table, Maccabi Acre and Hapoel Daliyat al-Karmel were automatically relegated to Liga Alef.

== Final table ==
Pos	Team	Pld	W	D	L	GF	GA	GD	Pts	Promotion or relegation
1	Ironi Rishon LeZion	30	18	6	6	53	27	+26	60	Promoted to Liga Leumit
2	Hapoel Beit She'an	30	15	6	9	28	20	+8	51	Promoted to Liga Leumit
3	Beitar Tel Aviv	30	14	8	8	37	32	+5	50	Promoted to Liga Leumit
4	Shimshon Tel Aviv	30	14	7	9	40	31	+9	49	Play-off
5	Hapoel Tayibe	30	11	11	8	31	26	+5	44	
6	Hapoel Bat Yam	30	11	10	9	39	33	+6	43	
7	Maccabi Yavne	30	13	4	13	34	32	+2	43	
8	Hapoel Hadera	30	15	9	6	48	27	+21	42 (Note: 12 points deducted)	
9	Hapoel Ashkelon	30	9	11	10	36	35	+1	38	
10	Hapoel Jerusalem	30	8	12	10	30	34	−4	36	
11	SK Nes Tziona	30	10	6	14	31	41	−10	36	
12	Hakoah Ramat Gan	30	12	11	7	45	36	+9	33 (Note: 14 points deducted)	
13	Maccabi Jaffa	30	8	9	13	21	29	−8	33	
14	Hapoel Ashdod	30	7	9	14	16	30	−14	30	
15	Maccabi Acre	30	6	7	17	31	48	−17	25	Relegated to Liga Alef
16	Hapoel Daliyat al-Karmel	30	3	6	21	21	60	−39	10 (Note: 5 points deducted)	Relegated to Liga Alef

Source: rsssf.com

== Promotion-relegation play-offs ==
4th-placed Shimshon Tel Aviv played-off against Hapoel Haifa, who had finished 13th in Liga Leumit. Although Shimshon won the first leg (played in Haifa) 1–0, Hapoel won the return 3–0 to remain in the top division.

Hapoel Haifa	0 – 1	Shimshon Tel Aviv

Kiryat Eliezer, Haifa

Shimshon Tel Aviv	0 – 3	Hapoel Haifa

Bloomfield Stadium, Tel Aviv
