= 1981–82 Liga Alef =

Israeli football season

The 1981–82 Liga Alef season saw Hapoel Hadera (champions of the North Division) and Hapoel Ashkelon (champions of the South Division) win the title and promotion to Liga Artzit. Maccabi Shefa-'Amr also promoted after promotion play-offs.

== North Division ==
Pos	Team	Pld	W	D	L	GF	GA	GD	Pts	Promotion or relegation
1	Hapoel Hadera	26	–	–	–	47	25	+22	43	Promoted to Liga Artzit
2	Maccabi Shefa-'Amr	26	–	–	–	41	20	+21	37	Promotion play-offs
3	Beitar Haifa	26	–	–	–	32	23	+9	32	
4	Hapoel Migdal HaEmek	26	–	–	–	33	35	−2	29	
5	Hapoel Bnei Nazareth	26	–	–	–	40	23	+17	28	
6	Hapoel Ramat HaSharon	26	–	–	–	28	26	+2	26	
7	Hapoel Ra'anana	26	–	–	–	32	33	−1	26	
8	Maccabi Hadera	26	–	–	–	30	32	−2	23	
9	Hapoel Kiryat Ata	26	–	–	–	25	30	−5	23	
10	Hapoel Tirat HaCarmel	26	–	–	–	24	29	−5	23	
11	Maccabi Herzliya	26	–	–	–	21	30	−9	21	
12	Hapoel Givat Olga	26	–	–	–	24	36	−12	20	
13	Hapoel Afikim	26	–	–	–	28	36	−8	19	Relegated to Liga Bet
14	Hapoel Nahariya	26	–	–	–	14	45	−31	12	Relegated to Liga Bet

== South Division ==
Pos	Team	Pld	W	D	L	GF	GA	GD	Pts	Promotion or relegation
1	Hapoel Ashkelon	24	–	–	–	41	23	+18	30	Promoted to Liga Artzit
2	Hapoel Bat Yam	24	–	–	–	33	19	+14	30	Promotion play-offs
3	Beitar Be'er Sheva	24	–	–	–	25	11	+14	30	
4	Hapoel Dimona	24	–	–	–	30	17	+13	28	
5	Hapoel Kiryat Ono	24	–	–	–	24	18	+6	28	
6	Maccabi Sha'arayim	24	–	–	–	14	12	+2	27	
7	Hapoel Ramla	24	–	–	–	22	24	−2	24	
8	Hapoel Ashdod	24	–	–	–	23	23	0	23	
9	Hapoel Holon	24	–	–	–	24	29	−5	22	
10	Hapoel Yeruham	24	–	–	–	23	29	−6	21	
11	Hapoel Marmorek	24	–	–	–	29	35	−6	19	
12	Hapoel Azor	24	–	–	–	16	30	−14	16	
13	Hapoel Herzliya	24	–	–	–	21	48	−27	14	Relegated to Liga Bet

Maccabi Lazarus Holon suspended from the league and demoted to Liga Bet, due to riot in their eighteenth match against Hapoel Holon, which abandoned in the 44th minute.

== Promotion play-offs ==
Hapoel Bat Yam	0 – 0	Maccabi Shefa-'Amr

Hapoel Petah Tikva

Maccabi Shefa-'Amr	4 – 3 (a.e.t.)	Hapoel Bat Yam
Armeli (4 goals)

Hapoel Petah Tikva

Maccabi Shefa-'Amr promoted to Liga Artzit.
