= 1991–92 Liga Artzit =

The 1991–92 Liga Artzit season saw Beitar Jerusalem and Hapoel Haifa promoted to Liga Leumit. At the other end of the table, Beitar Netanya and Hapoel Tiberias relegated to Liga Alef.

== Final table ==
Pos	Team	Pld	W	D	L	GF	GA	GD	Pts	Promotion or relegation
1	Beitar Jerusalem	30	17	9	4	50	20	+30	60	Promoted to Liga Leumit
2	Hapoel Haifa	30	18	6	6	48	28	+20	60	Promoted to Liga Leumit
3	Shimshon Tel Aviv	30	17	7	6	47	36	+11	58	
4	Hapoel Kfar Saba	30	13	9	8	41	32	+9	48	
5	Maccabi Acre	30	11	11	8	31	29	+2	44	
6	Maccabi Jaffa	30	12	8	10	38	37	+1	44	
7	Maccabi Herzliya	30	11	9	10	39	36	+3	42	
8	Hapoel Hadera	30	10	8	12	33	35	−2	38	
9	Ironi Ashdod	30	10	7	13	42	40	+2	37	
10	Hapoel Ramat Gan	30	9	8	13	41	45	−4	35	
11	SK Nes Tziona	30	7	11	12	28	39	−11	32	
12	Maccabi Sha'arayim	30	7	10	13	33	42	−9	31	
13	Hakoah Ramat Gan	30	8	7	15	35	50	−15	31	
14	Hapoel Ashdod	30	5	15	10	29	36	−7	30	Relegation play-off
15	Beitar Netanya	30	7	9	14	31	44	−13	30	Relegated to Liga Alef
16	Hapoel Tiberias	30	6	10	14	37	54	−17	28	Relegated to Liga Alef

== Promotion-relegation play-offs ==
14th placed Hapoel Ashdod had to play-off against Liga Alef play-off winners Hapoel Kiryat Shmona:

Hapoel Ashdod	1 – 0	Hapoel Kiryat Shmona

The result meant that Hapoel Ashdod remained in Liga Artzit.
