= 1971–72 Liga Alef =

Israeli football season

The 1971–72 Liga Alef season saw Maccabi Petah Tikva (champions of the North Division) and Hapoel Marmorek (champions of the South Division) win the title and promotion to Liga Leumit.

== North Division ==
Pos	Team	Pld	W	D	L	GF	GA	GD	Pts	Promotion or relegation
1	Maccabi Petah Tikva	30	22	6	2	76	19	+57	50	Promoted to Liga Leumit
2	Hapoel Acre	30	18	5	7	54	29	+25	41	
3	Hapoel Ramat Gan	30	16	6	8	41	28	+13	38	
4	Hapoel Tirat HaCarmel	30	13	8	9	40	32	+8	34	
5	Hapoel Migdal HaEmek	30	12	9	9	48	48	0	33	
6	Hapoel Kiryat Shmona	30	11	7	12	26	30	−4	29	
7	Hapoel Mahane Yehuda	30	10	9	11	30	37	−7	29	
8	Hapoel Nahliel	30	10	9	11	38	51	−13	29	
9	Beitar Netanya	30	10	8	12	40	44	−4	28	
10	Maccabi Herzliya	30	7	14	9	28	32	−4	28	
11	Hapoel Bnei Nazareth	30	11	5	14	37	44	−7	27	
12	Hapoel Nahariya	30	9	8	13	34	38	−4	26	
13	Hapoel Tiberias	30	8	10	12	40	46	−6	26	
14	Hapoel Herzliya	30	7	12	11	27	35	−8	26	
15	Hapoel Netanya	30	10	4	16	35	37	−2	24	Relegated to Liga Bet
16	Hapoel Kiryat Haim	30	4	4	22	20	62	−42	12	Relegated to Liga Bet

== South Division ==
Pos	Team	Pld	W	D	L	GF	GA	GD	Pts	Promotion or relegation
1	Hapoel Marmorek	30	22	3	5	70	25	+45	47	Promoted to Liga Leumit
2	Hapoel Holon	30	19	7	4	61	20	+41	45	
3	Maccabi Sha'arayim	30	16	12	2	55	27	+28	44	
4	Hapoel Yehud	30	9	14	7	34	33	+1	32	
5	Hapoel Be'er Ya'akov	30	11	7	12	54	60	−6	29	
6	Hapoel Beit Shemesh	30	12	5	13	32	41	−9	29	
7	Hapoel Lod	30	11	7	12	40	50	−10	29	
8	Hapoel Rishon LeZion	30	8	11	11	45	47	−2	27	
9	Beitar Ramla	30	7	13	10	28	30	−2	27	
10	Hapoel Ashdod	30	6	15	9	34	42	−8	27	
11	Hapoel Bat Yam	30	9	7	14	27	30	−3	25	
12	Hapoel Kiryat Ono	30	10	5	15	44	49	−5	25	
13	Maccabi Ramat Amidar	30	9	7	14	35	45	−10	25	
14	Hapoel Eilat	30	9	6	15	33	46	−13	24	
15	Hapoel Ashkelon	30	5	11	14	20	38	−18	21	Relegated to Liga Bet
16	Maccabi Bat Yam	30	6	8	16	26	52	−26	20	Relegated to Liga Bet
