= 1981–82 Liga Artzit =

The 1981–82 Liga Artzit season saw Hapoel Lod win the title and win promotion to Liga Leumit. Hapoel Ramat Gan and Maccabi Yavne were also promoted.

Maccabi Kiryat Gat, Beitar Netanya and Hapoel Tiberias were all relegated to Liga Alef.

== Final table ==
Pos	Team	Pld	W	D	L	GF	GA	GD	Pts	Promotion or relegation
1	Hapoel Lod	30	18	6	6	40	23	+17	42	Promoted to Liga Leumit
2	Hapoel Ramat Gan	30	15	9	6	41	22	+19	39	Promoted to Liga Leumit
3	Maccabi Yavne	30	13	12	5	33	16	+17	38	Promoted to Liga Leumit
4	Hakoah Ramat Gan	30	14	8	8	38	30	+8	36	
5	Maccabi Ramat Amidar	30	12	9	9	37	31	+6	33	
6	Hapoel Haifa	30	9	11	10	34	27	+7	29	
7	Beitar Ramla	30	9	11	10	27	24	+3	29	
8	Hapoel Beit She'an	30	10	9	11	32	32	0	29	
9	Hapoel Acre	30	10	9	11	31	31	0	29	
10	Hapoel Kiryat Shmona	30	11	7	12	34	35	−1	29	
11	Hapoel Nazareth Illit	30	8	12	10	37	37	0	28	
12	Hapoel Beit Shemesh	30	7	14	9	27	29	−2	28	
13	Hapoel Tel Hanan	30	8	12	10	38	41	−3	28	
14	Maccabi Kiryat Gat	30	10	7	13	38	44	−6	27	Relegated to Liga Alef
15	Beitar Netanya	30	4	17	9	24	32	−8	25	Relegated to Liga Alef
16	Hapoel Tiberias	30	3	5	22	15	72	−57	11	Relegated to Liga Alef
