= Hapoel Kafr Kanna F.C. =

Israeli football club

Hapoel Kafr Kanna
- Full name: Hapoel Kafr Kanna Football Club הפועל כפר כנא
- Ground: Azmi Nassar Stadium, Kafr Kanna
- Capacity: 2,500
- Chairman: Youssef Taha
- League: Liga Alef North
- 2024–25: Liga Alef North, 13th of 16
Home colours	Away colours

Hapoel Kafr Kanna (Hebrew: הפועל כפר כנא) is an Israeli football club based in Kafr Kanna. The club is currently in the Liga Alef North division.

== History ==
The club played mostly in the lower divisions of Israeli football. In the 1994–95 season, Hapoel Kafr Kanna reached Liga Alef, where they played for 19 successive seasons, until the 2012–13 season, in which they finished second bottom and relegated to Liga Bet. The club's best placing to date came at the 1995–96 season, when they finished runners-up in Liga Alef North division, 5 points behind their local rivals, Maccabi Kafr Kanna, which were promoted to Liga Artzit, the second tier of Israeli football at the time.

In the 2013–14 season, the club came close to make a return to Liga Alef, when they finished level on points with Ihud Bnei Majd al-Krum, on top of Liga Bet South A division. A decisive match for promotion was held, in which Hapoel Kafr Kanna lost 3–4 in penalties, after 1–1 draw in 120 minutes. Following the defeat, Hapoel Kafr Kanna went to compete in the Promotion play-offs, where they lost in the first round 1–4 to Hapoel Shefa-'Amr and remained in Liga Bet.

In the 2014–15 season, the club won Liga Bet North A division and made a return to Liga Alef.

== Honours ==
=== League ===
Honour	No.	Years
Fourth tier	1	2014–15

=== Cups ===
Honour	No.	Years
Liga Bet North A Division Cup	1	2014–15
