= F.C. Hapoel Lod Beni Regev =

- Full name: Hapoel Lod Football Club
- Founded: 1949; 2017 (re-founded)
- Dissolved: 2002
- Ground: Lod Municipal Stadium, Lod
- Chairman: Eliyahu Tenorman
- Manager: Zion Hayun
- League: Liga Bet South B
- 2024–25: Liga Alef South, 15th of 16 (relegated)
Home colours	Away colours

F.C. Hapoel Lod Beni Regev (Hebrew: מועדון ספורט הפועל לוד בני רגב) was an Israeli football club based in Lod. The club spent several seasons in the top division in the 1960s and 1980s, and won the State Cup in 1984. After several relegations, they folded in 2002.

== History ==
The club was established in 1949. In 1963 they were promoted to Liga Leumit (then the top division) for the first time. However, in their first season in the league, they finished bottom and were relegated back to Liga Alef.

They returned to Liga Leumit in 1983, finishing seventh in their first season back in the top division, and reaching the State Cup final for the first time. In the final they beat Hapoel Be'er Sheva 3–2 on penalties after a 0–0 draw.

The club was relegated back the second tier at the end of the 1984–85 season, in which they finished second from bottom. The following season they finished third in Liga Artzit (then the second division) and made an immediate return to Liga Leumit.

In 1986–87 Hapoel finished fourth, their highest ever league position. However, the following season they finished second bottom and were relegated again. In 1989–90 they finished bottom of Liga Artzit and were relegated to Liga Alef.

They returned to Liga Artzit in 1997, but in 1998–99 finished 14th, and were due to be relegated to the third tier. However, after their budget was not approved by Israel Football Association, the club was demoted a further division, to Liga Alef. At the end of the 2001–02 season the club were relegated to Liga Bet, and folded.

A new club, Hapoel Maxim Lod was established soon afterwards (named after a former Lod mayor, Maxim Levy). In 2006 the new club won the South B division of Liga Bet, and in 2007 won the South Division of Liga Alef to earn promotion to Liga Artzit. However, the new club folded in the summer of 2007 and Hapoel Kfar Shalem were promoted in their place.

== Honours ==
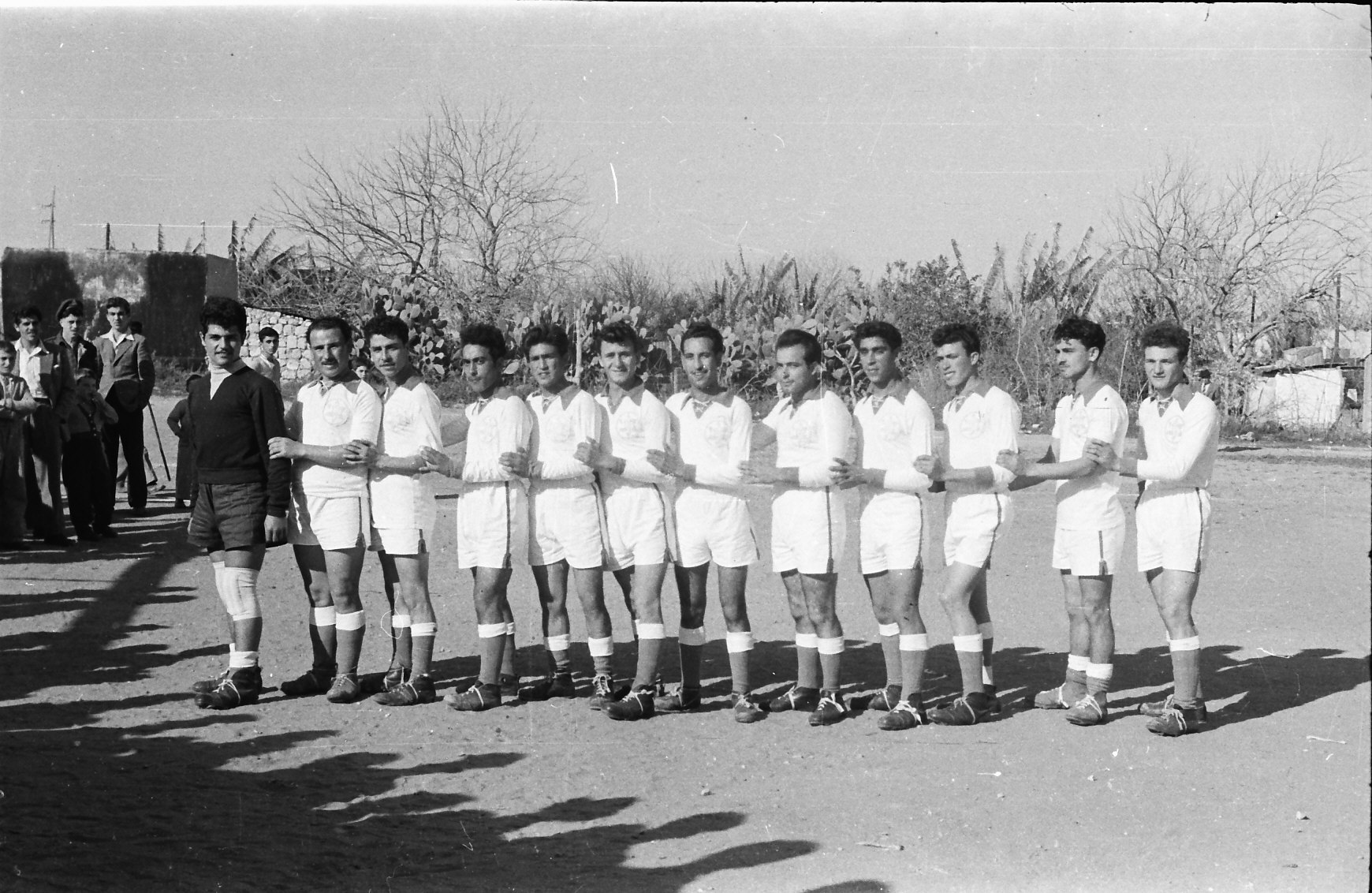
Hapoel Lod 1969–70

=== League ===
Honour	No.	Years
Second tier	1	1981–82
Third tier	3	1959–60, 1961–62, 1996–97
Fourth tier	3	1955–56, 1976–77, 2006–07^{1}
Fifth tier	1	2005–06^{1}
Sixth tier	1	2004–05^{1}

^{1}Achieved by Hapoel Maxim Lod

=== Cup competitions ===
Honour	No.	Years
State Cup	1	1983–84
Super Cup	1	1984

== Notable former players ==
- Vicky Peretz (1953–2021)

David O'Neill
