= Hapoel Dimona F.C. =

Hapoel Dimona
- Full name: Hapoel Dimona הפועל דימונה
- Founded: 1956 as Hapoel Dimona; 1965 (Merger)
- Dissolved: 2003
- Ground: Municipal Stadium, Dimona
- League: Liga Alef South
- 2015–16: 1st
Home colours	Away colours

Hapoel Dimona (Hebrew: הפועל דימונה) was an Israeli football club based in Dimona.

== History ==
Hapoel Dimona was founded in 1956 and joined Liga Gimel. The club won Liga Gimel Negev division in the 1963–64 season and had to play in a Promotion play-offs, which was previously decided by the Israel Football Association. However, they refused to play the match and claimed for discrimination, as other Liga Gimel champions were promoted without a play-off match. As a result, they lost by walkover, and remained in Liga Gimel.

Prior to the 1965–66 season, Hapoel Dimona merged with Liga Bet club, Hapoel Avraham Be'er Sheva, which was a feeder club of top flight club, Hapoel Be'er Sheva, after Hapoel Be'er Sheva sold Hapoel Avraham to the municipality of Dimona. with the merger, the club advanced to Liga Bet, the third tier of Israeli football at the time.

In the 1971–72 season, the club won Liga Bet South B division and promoted for the first time in their history to Liga Alef, the second tier at the time. The club's best placing in the second tier, was the fifth place in Liga Alef South division, which was achieved in both 1972–73 and 1974–75 seasons. In 1976, following the creation of Liga Artzit, Liga Alef became the third tier of Israeli football, where the club continued to play after they finished twelfth at the 1975–76 season. Dimona was relegated to Liga Bet (now the fourth tier) in both 1976–77 and 1982–83 seasons. However, the club made an immediate return to Liga Alef in both occasions. In the 1985–86 season, the club won Liga Alef South division, and promoted to Liga Artzit. However, the club spent only one season in Liga Artzit, as they finished bottom in the 1986–87 season, winning only four games, and relegated back to Liga Alef. In 1989–90, Dimona suffered further relegation and remained six seasons in Liga Bet before returning to Liga Alef. In the 1998–99 season the club won Liga Alef South, thirteen years after the previous time, and promoted to Liga Artzit (which became the third tier of Israeli football due to the formation of the Israeli Premier League in that season). Dimona was relegated back to Liga Alef, once more after one season only, as they finished second bottom in the 1999–2000 Liga Artzit.

The 2002–03 Liga Alef season was their last as Hapoel Dimona, as the club folded afterwards, as a result of administrative and financial problems and restarted in Liga Gimel as F.C. Dimona. Differently, The Israel Football Association have approved Hapoel Dimona's youth section to be renamed to F.C. Dimona, without being relegated to a lower tier.

== Honours ==
=== League ===
Honour	No.	Years
Third tier	3	1971–72, 1985–86, 1998–99
Fourth tier	3	1963–64, 1983–84, 1995–96
