= Maccabi Or Akiva F.C. =

Maccabi Or Akiva
- Full name: Maccabi Or Akiva Football Club מכבי אור עקיבא
- Founded: 1966
- Dissolved: 2013
- Ground: Or Akiva Ground, Or Akiva
- League: Liga Gimel Samaria
- 2012–13: 15th

Maccabi Or Akiva (Hebrew: מכבי אור עקיבא) was an Israeli football club based in Or Akiva.

== History ==
The club was founded in 1966 and played in the lower leagues in its early years, finally advancing to Liga Bet for 1978–79. After two seasons in Liga Bet, the club won its division and was promoted to third tier Liga Alef. However, the club stayed only one season in third tier and dropped back to Liga Bet at the end of the season.

The club was promoted, once again, to Liga Alef in 1984. In 1996, the club relegated to Liga Bet and a second relegation followed in 1998, meaning the club now played in bottom tier Liga Gimel, which lasted until winning its Liga Gimel division, gaining promotion to Liga Bet. For the following 8, the club played mostly in Liga Bet except for one season in which it played in Liga Gimel. In 2011–12 the club finished bottom in Liga Bet and relegated to Liga Gimel, in which the club once again finished bottom. Over the summer, the club was closed by city officials and was replaced by a new club, Hapoel Ironi Or Akiva.

== Honours ==
=== League ===
Honour	No.	Years
Fourth tier	1	1979–80, 1983–84
Fifth tier	1	1977–78, 2010–11
Sixth tier	2	2003–04, 2008–09
