= Hapoel Daliyat al-Karmel F.C. =

Israeli football club

Hapoel Daliyat al-Karmel
- Full name: Hapoel Muin Daliyat al-Karmel Football Club
- Founded: 1971
- Ground: Municipal Stadium, Daliyat al-Karmel
- Manager: Ihab Halabi
- League: Liga Gimel
- 2023–24: Liga Gimel Samaria, 6th
Home colours	Away colours

Hapoel Muin Daliyat al-Karmel (Hebrew: הפועל דליית אל כרמל) is a football club based in Daliyat al-Karmel in northern Israel. The club is named for Muin Rashad, a former player who was killed during the Yom Kippur War.

== History ==
In 1989–90 the club finished second in the North Division of Liga Alef, qualifying for the promotion/relegation play-offs, but losing to the South Division's runners-up Ironi Ashdod. The club's most successful period came in the next few years as they were promoted to Liga Artzit, then the second level, with the financial backing of the local council.

In 1993–94 the club finished bottom of Liga Artzit and were relegated back to Liga Alef. During the season the club had five points deducted after being found guilty of bribing opposition players during a game the during the previous season. The club was then relegated in consecutive seasons to Liga Bet and then Liga Gimel.

In 1996–97 the club were promoted back to Liga Bet, where they remained until earning promotion to Liga Alef at the end of the 2009–10 season after finishing second in their division of Liga Bet.

In 2013–14, the club finished 14th in Liga Alef North, and relegated to Liga Bet following a defeat of 5–6 on penalties to Maccabi Sektzia Ma'alot-Tarshiha, after a goalless draw in the promotion/relegation play-offs.

== Honours ==
=== League ===
Honour	No.	Years
Fourth tier	1	2009–10
Fifth tier	1	1996–97

=== Cup competitions ===
Honour	No.	Years
Liga Bet North B Division Cup	1	2009–10
