= F.C. Shikun HaMizrah =

Israeli sport team

- Full name: Moadon Sport Shikun HaMizrah מועדון ספורט שיכון המזרח
- Nickname(s): Shikuniya
- Founded: 1958 as Hapoel Shikun HaMizrah; 1977 as Maccabi Shikun HaMizrah; 2004 as F.C. Shikun HaMizrah
- Ground: Shikun HaMizrah Stadium, Rishon LeZion
- Owner: Issachar Buri
- Manager: Shimon Vaknin
- League: Liga Bet South B
- 2023–24: Liga Alef South B, 4th
Home colours	Away colours

F.C. Shikun HaMizrah (Hebrew: מועדון ספורט שיכון המזרח), Moadon Sport Shikun HaMizrah, lit. Shikun HaMizrah Sport Club (or in short מ.ס. שיכון המזרח Mem Samekh Shikun HaMizrah, lit. F.C. Shikun HaMizrah) is an Israeli football club which representing Shikun HaMizrah neighborhood in Rishon LeZion. The club currently plays in Liga Alef South division.

== History ==
The club was founded in 1958 as Hapoel Shikun HaMizrah, and reached Liga Bet, (the third tier of Israeli football at the time), for the first time in the 1963–64 season.

For the 1977–78 season, the club became Maccabi Shikun HaMizrah, following a merger with Maccabi Rishon LeZion, which have previously established several sport clubs, including athletics, basketball, and also refounded the football club (the original club was dissolved during the 1953–54 season, and the refounded club played in the 1976–77 season in Liga Gimel). In the first season of the merged club, while playing in Liga Gimel, the club was close to make a big upset in the Israel State Cup, after they took top flight club, Hapoel Haifa to penalties, where they lost 1–4, after 2–2 draw in 120 minutes. The club was mentioned in the press by both Maccabi Rishon LeZion and Maccabi Shikun HaMizrah names. The merger with Maccabi Rishon LeZion lasted until 1981, when a dispute concerning the use of facilities, arose between the football club and Maccabi Rishon LeZion athletics club. The club continued to play as Maccabi Shikun HaMizrah.

Maccabi Shikun HaMizrah reached Liga Alef (now as third tier) for the first time in the 1988–89 season. The club relegated to Liga Bet at the end of the 1990–91 season and bounced back to Liga Alef four seasons later, and a season later, in 1996–97, relegated again to Liga Bet, where they remained until they were dissolved prior to the 1999–2000 season. The club refounded in 2004 as F.C. Shikun HaMizrah

As F.C. Shikun HaMizrah, the club was promoted from Liga Gimel to Liga Bet, after they finished runners-up in Liga Gimel Central division in the 2007–08 season. in the 2013–14 season, the club won Liga Bet South B division, and were promoted back to Liga Alef after 19 years.

== Honours ==
- Liga Bet:
  - 1987–88, 1994–95, 2013–14
- Liga Gimel:
  - 1971–72, 1977–78, 1982–83
