= Hapoel Be'er Ya'akov F.C. =

Hapoel Be'er Ya'akov
- Full name: Hapoel Be'er Ya'akov Football Club הפועל באר יעקב
- Founded: 1954
- Dissolved: 2005
- Ground: Be'er Ya'akov Stadium, Be'er Ya'akov
Home colours	Away colours

Hapoel Be'er Ya'akov (Hebrew: הפועל באר יעקב) was an Israeli football club based in Be'er Ya'akov.

== History ==
The club was founded in 1954 and joined Liga Gimel, then the third tier of Israeli football. In the 1959–60 season, they reached Liga Bet (now as third tier), after that league was expanded to 64 clubs, divided in four regional divisions in that season. In the 1965–66 season, the club won Liga Bet South A division and promoted for the first time in their history to Liga Alef, the second tier at the time. Hapoel played nine seasons in the second tier, with their best placing was the fifth place in Liga Alef South division, which was achieved in the 1971–72 season. In 1976, following the creation of Liga Artzit, Liga Alef became the third tier of Israeli football, where the club continued to play after they finished fifteenth in the 1975–76 season. However, they dropped further tier, to Liga Bet (now as fourth tier), after they finished bottom in Liga Alef South at the following season. Eleven years later, in the 1987–88 season, Hapoel won Liga Bet South B division and returned to Liga Alef, where they played until they were relegated back to Liga Bet, at the end of the 1994–95 season. In 1999, following the creation of the Israeli Premier League, Liga Bet became the fifth tier. However, as the club withdrew from the 1999–2000 season, they dropped to Liga Gimel, the sixth and lowest tier of Israeli football at the time and folded at the end of the 2004–05, while playing in Liga Gimel Central division.

Later in 2005, a new club was founded, Maccabi Be'er Ya'akov, which have joined Liga Gimel in the following season.

== Honours ==
=== League ===
Honour	No.	Years
Third tier	1	1965–66
Fourth tier	1	1987–88
