= Maccabi Shefa-'Amr F.C. =

Israeli football club

Maccabi Shefa-'Amr
- Full name: Maccabi Shefa-'Amr Football Club מכבי שפרעם
- Founded: 1968; 2009; 2014
- Dissolved: 2018
- Ground: Shefa-'Amr Stadium, Shefa-'Amr
- League: Liga Bet North A
- 2017–18: 9th
Home colours	Away colours

Maccabi Shefa-'Amr (Hebrew: מכבי שפרעם) was an Israeli football club based in Shefa-'Amr.

== History ==
The club was founded in 1968 and played in the lower divisions of Israeli football until the late 1970s, when the club enjoyed a period of success, after they won Liga Bet North A division in the 1979–80 season and were promoted to Liga Alef. Two seasons later, they finished runners-up in Liga Alef North division and qualified for the promotion play-off, where they faced the South division runners-up, Hapoel Bat Yam. After the first leg ended in a goalless draw, Shefa-'Amr made historic promotion to Liga Artzit, the second tier of Israeli football at the time, after they won the second leg by a result of 4–3 after extra time, with all their four goals scored by Zahi Armeli, who would later move to Maccabi Haifa and became their all-time top scorer.

The club's spell in Liga Artzit lasted only one season, as they finished third bottom in the 1982–83 season, winning only five games, and relegated back to Liga Alef. In the 1985–86 season, the club suffered further relegation, after they finished bottom in Liga Alef North division and relegated to Liga Bet.

By the mid-1990s the club had returned to Liga Alef, and came close to achieve promotion to Liga Artzit (then the third tier), after runners-up finish in the 2001–02 season. In the 2005–06 season, the club finished bottom in Liga Alef North division, relegated to Liga Bet and eventually folded. Later, the management rights of other Liga Alef club, Maccabi Ironi Shlomi/Nahariya, were transferred to the Maccabi Shefa-'Amr association. That club was folded as well, at the end of the 2008–09 season, after they were demoted to Liga Gimel by the Israel Football Association, following an attempt of match-fixing.

== Maccabi Tzeirei Shefa-'Amr ==
Maccabi Tzeirei Shefa-'Amr
- Full name: Maccabi Tzeirei Shefa-'Amr Football Club מכבי צעירי שפרעם
- Founded: 2009; 2014 (Re-established)
- Ground: Shefa-'Amr Stadium, Shefa-'Amr
- Chairman: Mounir Natour
- Manager: Nazia Odeh
- League: Liga Gimel Lower Galilee
- 2015–16: 1st
Home colours	Away colours

In 2009, a successor club, Maccabi Tzeirei Shefa-'Amr (Hebrew: מכבי צעירי שפרעם), was founded and joined Liga Gimel. Although the club's activity ceased after the 2010–11 season, it was re-established prior to the 2014–15 season and currently plays in Liga Gimel Lower Galilee division.

Maccabi Tzeirei Shefa-'Amr are still commonly known and referred as Maccabi Shefa-'Amr.
