= Maccabi Isfiya F.C. =

Israeli football club

Maccabi Isfiya
- Full name: Maccabi Isfiya Football Club מכבי עוספיא
- Founded: 1975; 2012 (Refounded)
- Ground: Isfiya Ground, Isfiya
- Chairman: anas mansour
- League: Liga Gimel
- 2023–24: Liga Gimel Samaria, 5th
Home colours	Away colours

Maccabi Isfiya (Hebrew: מכבי עוספיא) is a football club based in Isfiya in northern Israel. The club is currently in Liga Gimel Samaria division.

== History ==
The club was founded in 1975 and reached Liga Bet for the first time in the 1984–85 season. In the 1986–87 season the club won Liga Bet North B division and achieved promotion to Liga Alef after the 23rd match, when they won 3–1 against Hapoel Givat Olga. thus, Maccabi Isfiya became the first Druze football club which was promoted to Liga Alef. Their main rivals at the time were Hapoel Daliyat al-Karmel.

The club played 14 seasons in Liga Alef, until relegation in the 2000–01 season. The club folded at the end of the 2002–03 season while playing in Liga Bet.

The club was refounded in 2012 and currently plays in Liga Gimel Jezreel division.

== Honours ==
- Liga Bet North B
  - Champions 1986–87
- Liga Gimel Haifa
  - Champions 1983–84
