= Liga Alef =

- Founded: 1949
- Country: Israel
- Confederation: UEFA (Europe)
- Divisions: 2
- Number of clubs: 32
- Level on pyramid: 3
- Promotion to: Liga Leumit
- Relegation to: Liga Bet
- Domestic cup: State Cup
- Current champions: Hapoel Ra'anana (North); Hapoel Kfar Shalem (South)
- Website: North; South
- Current: 2025–26 Liga Alef

Liga Alef (Hebrew: ליגה א׳, lit. 'League A') is the third tier of the Israeli football league system. It is divided into two regional divisions, north and south.

== History ==
League football began in Israel in 1949–50, a year after the Israeli Declaration of Independence. However, the financial and security crises gripping the young nation caused the 1950–51 season to be abandoned before it had started. When football resumed in 1951–52, the new top division went by the name of Liga Alef. The 1952–53 season was also not played and Liga Alef resumed in 1953–54.

In the 1955–56 season, Liga Leumit came into existence as the new top division, with Liga Alef becoming the second division. In the summer of 1976, restructuring saw the creation of Liga Artzit as a new second tier, and the second demotion of Liga Alef, as it became the third division. Further restructuring to create the Israeli Premier League in the summer of 1999 saw Liga Alef demoted again, this time to the fourth tier. At the end of the 2008–09 season, Liga Artzit was scrapped as the Premier League and Liga Leumit were expanded to 16 clubs each, with Liga Alef becoming the third tier once more.

== Structure ==
Today, Liga Alef is split into two regional divisions on a north-south basis. Because Israel's northern half is much more densely populated than the desert south, the dividing line between the northern and southern divisions is somewhere between Haifa and Tel Aviv, meaning that the southern "half" covers about three-quarters of the country. Although this inequality is partially offset by the fact that there are so few clubs south of Beersheba (Dimona, Yeroham, Mitzpe Ramon and Eilat are the only sizable towns south of the city, while Arad is approximately on the same latitude), the northern clubs tend to be clustered in the Galilee region, making travel to away matches much less of a chore.

Each division has sixteen clubs, who play each other home and away to make a 30-game season. The club finishing top of each regional division is promoted to Liga Leumit, whilst the eight second to fifth placed clubs have a play-off, with the winner playing-off against the third-bottom club in Liga Leumit for a place in that division. The bottom two from each division are relegated to Liga Bet, the fourth tier, and the two third-bottom clubs playing-off against play-off winners from Liga Bet for a place in Liga Alef. Coming into Liga Alef are the two or three clubs relegated from Liga Leumit and the four to six clubs promoted from Liga Bet (the winner of each of the four regional divisions, and one or two more runners-up, had they are successful in the play-off). The clubs are then pooled and assigned to the most geographically appropriate of the two divisions.

== Current members ==
The following clubs are participating in the 2026–27

| North | South |
|---|---|
| Beitar Nahariya | F.C. Dimona |
| F.C. Tira | F.C. Jerusalem |
| Hapoel Baqa al-Gharbiyye | F.C. Kfar Saba |
| Hapoel Beit She'an/Mesilot | F.C. Nordia Jerusalem |
| Hapoel Bnei Araba | F.C. Sderot |
| Hapoel Bnei Musmus | F.C. Tzeirei Tira |
| Hapoel Ihud Bnei Jatt | Hapoel Azor |
| Hapoel Ironi Karmiel | Hapoel Hadera |
| Hapoel Migdal HaEmek | Hapoel Herzliya |
| Hapoel Nof HaGalil | Hapoel Mahane Yehuda |
| Hapoel Tirat HaCarmel | Hapoel Marmorek |
| Ihud Umm al-Fahm | Hapoel Nir Ramat HaSharon |
| Ironi Nesher | Holon Yermiyahu F.C. |
| Maccabi Nujeidat | Ironi Beit Shemesh |
| Maccabi Ata Bialik | Maccabi Ironi Ashdod |
| Maccabi Neve Sha'anan Eldad | Maccabi Ironi Kiryat Malakhi |
| Tzeirei Tamra | Maccabi Yavne |
| - | Shimshon Tel Aviv |

== Previous seasons ==
=== 1951–63 ===
| Season | Winner | Relegated |
First tier
| 1951–52 | Maccabi Tel Aviv | Hapoel Rishon LeZion, Maccabi Rishon LeZion |
| 1953–54 | Maccabi Tel Aviv | None ^{1} |
| 1954–55 | Hapoel Petah Tikva | Beitar Jerusalem, Hapoel Hadera, Hapoel Balfouria |
Second tier
| 1955–56 | Hakoah Tel Aviv ^{2} | Ahva Notzrit Haifa, Hapoel Ra'anana, Hapoel Balfouria |
| 1956–57 | Hapoel Kfar Saba ^{3} | Hapoel Nahariya, Maccabi Ramat Gan |
| 1957–58 | Beitar Jerusalem ^{4} | None ^{4} |
| 1958–59 | Bnei Yehuda | Maccabi Sha'arayim, Hapoel Afula |
| 1959–60 | Shimshon Tel Aviv | Maccabi Rehovot, Hapoel Netanya |
| 1960–61 | Hapoel Tiberias | Hapoel Hadera, Hapoel Herzliya |
| 1961–62 | Hakoah Tel Aviv | Maccabi Hadera, Hapoel Rehovot |
| 1962–63 | Hapoel Ramat Gan ^{5} | Hapoel Safed, Maccabi Ramla |

^{1} No clubs were relegated as the league was expanded to 14 clubs in the following season.

^{2} There was no automatic promotion in the 1955-56 season. Hakoah Tel Aviv lost in the promotion play-offs to Maccabi Jaffa of Liga Leumit.

^{3} First placed Hapoel Kfar Saba and third placed Hapoel Jerusalem were promoted after promotion play-offs.

^{4} No clubs were promoted or relegated after the Israel Football Association decided to abandon the league before the end of the season, due to suspicions of bribery.

^{5} Hapoel Lod and Maccabi Sha'arayim were also promoted.

=== Northern division ===
| Season | Winner | Relegated |
Second tier
| 1963–64 | Maccabi Netanya | Hapoel Nahariya, Hapoel Givat Haim |
| 1964–65 | Hapoel Mahane Yehuda | Maccabi Zikhron Ya'akov, Hapoel Ra'anana |
| 1965–66 | Maccabi Haifa | Hapoel Kiryat Shmona, Beitar Haifa |
| 1966–68 | Hapoel Kfar Saba | Hapoel Nahariya, Hapoel Safed |
| 1968–69 | Maccabi Petah Tikva | Hapoel Ra'anana, Hapoel Kfar Blum |
| 1969–70 | Hapoel Hadera | Hapoel Kiryat Haim, Beitar Kiryat Tiv'on |
| 1970–71 | Maccabi Jaffa | Hapoel Zikhron Ya'akov, Maccabi Hadera |
| 1971–72 | Maccabi Petah Tikva | Hapoel Netanya, Hapoel Kiryat Haim |
| 1972–73 | Hapoel Hadera | Hapoel Mahane Yehuda, Hapoel Givat Haim |
| 1973–74 | Hapoel Acre ^{1} | Hapoel Migdal HaEmek |
| 1974–75 | Maccabi Haifa | None ^{2} |
| 1975–76 | Hapoel Acre | Hapoel Tiberias, Hapoel Kiryat Ata |
Third tier
| 1976–77 | Hapoel Tirat HaCarmel | Hapoel Mahane Yehuda, Hapoel Safed |
| 1977–78 | Hapoel Tiberias ^{3} | Hapoel Bnei Nazareth, Hapoel Beit Eliezer |
| 1978–79 | Hapoel Nazareth Illit ^{4} | Hapoel Nahliel, Hapoel Givat Haim |
| 1979–80 | Hapoel Kiryat Shmona | Maccabi Ahi Nazareth, Hapoel Umm al-Fahm |
| 1980–81 | Beitar Netanya ^{5} | Hapoel Netanya, Maccabi Or Akiva |
| 1981–82 | Hapoel Hadera ^{6} | Hapoel Afikim, Hapoel Nahariya |
| 1982–83 | Beitar Haifa | Hapoel Givat Olga, Hapoel Nahliel |
| 1983–84 | Hapoel Tiberias | Maccabi Bnei Hatzor, Hapoel Migdal HaEmek |
| 1984–85 | Beitar Netanya ^{7} | Hapoel Bnei Nazareth, Hapoel Tel Hanan |
| 1985–86 | Hapoel Beit She'an ^{8} | Hapoel Nazareth Illit, Maccabi Shefa-'Amr |
| 1986–87 | Maccabi Hadera ^{9} | Hapoel Aliyah Kfar Saba, Maccabi Or Akiva |
| 1987–88 | Maccabi Tamra | Hapoel Ra'anana, Hapoel Bnei Tamra |
| 1988–89 | Hapoel Tirat HaCarmel | Hapoel Tira, Hapoel Kiryat Ata |
| 1989–90 | Maccabi Acre | Hapoel Bnei Nazareth, Beitar Haifa |
| 1990–91 | Maccabi Herzliya | Beitar Nahariya, Maccabi Hadera |
| 1991–92 | Hapoel Daliyat al-Karmel | Maccabi Tamra, Maccabi Kafr Kanna |
| 1992–93 | Hapoel Beit She'an ^{10} | Maccabi Bnei Hatzor |
| 1993–94 | Hapoel Ramat Gan ^{11} | Beitar Nahariya |
| 1994–95 | Maccabi Acre | Hapoel Tirat HaCarmel, Hapoel Tiberias |
| 1995–96 | Maccabi Kafr Kanna | Hapoel Givat Olga, Maccabi Or Akiva |
| 1996–97 | Bnei Sakhnin | Hapoel Migdal HaEmek, Hapoel Iksal |
| 1997–98 | Maccabi Ahi Nazareth | Maccabi Hadera, Hapoel Karmiel |
| 1998–99 | Hapoel Ra'anana ^{12} | Hapoel Umm al-Fahm, Hapoel Kafr Qasim |
Fourth tier
| 1999–2000 | Hapoel Majd al-Krum | Maccabi Afula |
| 2000–01 | Ironi Kiryat Shmona | Maccabi Isfiya, Hapoel Iksal |
| 2001–02 | Hapoel Kafr Sumei | Hapoel Tzeirei Nahf, Hapoel Hurfeish |
| 2002–03 | Hapoel Herzliya | Hapoel Hadera, Hapoel Tayibe |
| 2003–04 | Maccabi Hadera ^{13} | Hapoel Migdal HaEmek |
| 2004–05 | Maccabi Tzur Shalom | Hapoel Tuba, Maccabi Tur'an |
| 2005–06 | Hapoel Bnei Tamra | Maccabi Tamra, Hapoel Beit She'an, Maccabi Shefa-'Amr |
| 2006–07 | Hapoel Bnei Jadeidi | Hapoel Kafr Sumei, Hapoel Reineh, Maccabi Sektzia Ma'alot-Tarshiha |
| 2007–08 | Hapoel Umm al-Fahm | Beitar Haifa, Hapoel Ahva Haifa, Hapoel Makr |
| 2008–09 | Ahva Arraba | Maccabi Ironi Shlomi/Nahariya, Beitar Ihud Mashhad |
Third tier
| 2009–10 | Maccabi Ironi Jatt | Hapoel Bnei Jadeidi, Hapoel Bnei Tamra, Maccabi Ironi Tirat HaCarmel |
| 2010–11 | Maccabi Umm al-Fahm | Ironi Sayid Umm al-Fahm, Maccabi Kafr Qara, Hapoel Ramot Menashe Megiddo |
| 2011–12 | Hapoel Asi Gilboa ^{14} | Maccabi Ironi Tamra, Ahi Acre |
| 2012–13 | Hapoel Afula | Hapoel Kafr Kanna, Maccabi Sektzia Ma'alot-Tarshiha |
| 2013–14 | Hapoel Kfar Saba ^{15} | Hapoel Daliyat al-Karmel, Maccabi Kafr Kanna, Ahva Arraba |
| 2014–15 | Hapoel Katamon Jerusalem | Beitar Nahariya, Maccabi Umm al-Fahm |
| 2015–16 | Ironi Nesher | Maccabi Sektzia Ma'alot-Tarshiha, Ihud Bnei Majd al-Krum |
| 2016–17 | Hapoel Hadera | Tzeirei Kafr Kanna |
| 2017–18 | Hapoel Iksal | Hapoel Beit She'an, Maccabi Daliyat al-Karmel |
| 2018–19 | Hapoel Umm al-Fahm | Ironi Nesher, Hapoel Jerusalem |

^{1} There was no automatic promotion in the 1973-74 season. Hapoel Acre finished fifth in the promotion play-offs and remained in Liga Alef. However, runners-up, Shimshon Tel-Aviv, finished second in the promotion play-offs and were promoted to Liga Leumit.

^{2} Hapoel Kiryat Shmona and Hapoel Safed were reprieved from relegation after the Israel Football Association decided to expand Liga Leumit to 18 clubs and Liga Alef to 17 clubs in each division for the following season.

^{3} Maccabi Herzliya and Hapoel Beit She'an were also promoted.

^{4} Hapoel Herzliya were also promoted after play-off victory over runners-up of Liga Alef South, Maccabi Kiryat Gat.

^{5} Hapoel Tel Hanan were also promoted after play-off victory over runners-up of Liga Alef South, Hapoel Ramla.

^{6} Maccabi Shefa-'Amr were also promoted after play-off victory over runners-up of Liga Alef South, Hapoel Bat Yam.

^{7} Hapoel Acre were also promoted after play-off victory over runners-up of Liga Alef South, Maccabi Lazarus Holon.

^{8} Beitar Nahariya were also promoted after play-off victory over runners-up of Liga Alef South, Hapoel Rishon LeZion.

^{9} There was no automatic promotion in the 1986-87 season. Maccabi Hadera finished third in the promotion play-offs after Hapoel Bat Yam of Liga Alef South and Hapoel Ramat Gan of Liga Artzit and remained in Liga Alef.

^{10} Hapoel Tayibe were also promoted as runners-up.

^{11} Hapoel Kiryat Shmona were also promoted as runners-up.

^{12} Hapoel Nazareth Illit, Hapoel Iksal and Hapoel Acre were also promoted.

^{13} Although Maccabi Hadera finished top, they folded and second-placed Maccabi Ironi Tirat HaCarmel were promoted instead.

^{14} There was no automatic promotion in the 2011-12 season. Hapoel Asi Gilboa lost in promotion play-offs to the South division champions, Maccabi Yavne in away goals (2-2 on aggregate) and remained in Liga Alef.

^{15} Ironi Tiberias were also promoted after play-off victory over Hapoel Katamon of Liga Leumit.

=== Southern division ===
| Season | Winner | Relegated |
Second tier
| 1963–64 | Beitar Tel Aviv | Maccabi Shmuel Tel Aviv, Hapoel Rishon LeZion |
| 1964–65 | Hapoel Be'er Sheva | Hapoel Ramla, Beitar Harari Tel Aviv |
| 1965–66 | SK Nes Tziona | HaBira Jerusalem, Hapoel Giv'atayim |
| 1966–68 | Beitar Jerusalem | Beitar Kiryat Ono, Hapoel Kfar Shalem |
| 1968–69 | Beitar Tel Aviv | Hapoel Yehud, Maccabi Holon |
| 1969–70 | Hapoel Holon | Beitar Be'er Sheva, Hapoel Sderot |
| 1970–71 | Hapoel Be'er Sheva | SK Nes Tziona, Beitar Lod |
| 1971–72 | Hapoel Marmorek | Hapoel Ashkelon, Maccabi Bat Yam |
| 1972–73 | Bnei Yehuda | Hapoel Eilat, Hapoel Kiryat Ono |
| 1973–74 | Maccabi Sha'arayim ^{1} | Maccabi Holon |
| 1974–75 | Maccabi Ramat Amidar | None ^{2} |
| 1975–76 | Hapoel Yehud | Beitar Jaffa, Hapoel Lod |
Third tier
| 1976–77 | Hapoel Beit Shemesh | Hapoel Dimona, Hapoel Be'er Ya'akov |
| 1977–78 | Hapoel Marmorek ^{3} | Maccabi HaShikma Ramat Gan, Hapoel Rosh HaAyin |
| 1978–79 | Hapoel Beit Shemesh | SK Nes Tziona, Beitar Ashdod |
| 1979–80 | Maccabi Yavne ^{4} | Hapoel Or Yehuda, Hapoel Kafr Qasim |
| 1980–81 | Maccabi Kiryat Gat | Maccabi Be'er Sheva, Hapoel Rosh HaAyin |
| 1981–82 | Hapoel Ashkelon | Hapoel Herzliya, Maccabi Lazarus Holon |
| 1982–83 | Hapoel Marmorek ^{5} | Hapoel Ashdod, Hapoel Dimona |
| 1983–84 | Maccabi Sha'arayim ^{6} | Ironi Ashdod, Maccabi Herzliya |
| 1984–85 | Hapoel Beit Shemesh | Hapoel Ramla, Hapoel Ihud Tzeirei Jaffa |
| 1985–86 | Hapoel Dimona | Maccabi HaShikma Ramat Gan ^{7} |
| 1986–87 | Hapoel Bat Yam | Beitar Be'er Sheva, Hapoel Yeruham |
| 1987–88 | Beitar Ramla | Hapoel Ramat HaSharon, Hapoel Azor |
| 1988–89 | Hapoel Rishon LeZion | Hapoel Ramla, Hapoel Beit Shemesh |
| 1989–90 | Hapoel Ashdod ^{8} | Hapoel Or Yehuda, Hapoel Dimona |
| 1990–91 | SK Nes Tziona ^{9} | Maccabi Shikun HaMizrah, Hapoel Lod |
| 1991–92 | Hapoel Ashkelon | Hapoel Yehud, Hapoel Aliyah Kfar Saba |
| 1992–93 | Ironi Rishon LeZion ^{10} | Beitar Netanya |
| 1993–94 | Maccabi Kiryat Gat ^{11} | Maccabi HaShikma Ramat Hen |
| 1994–95 | Hapoel Kfar Shalem | Hapoel Be'er Ya'akov, Hapoel Daliyat al-Karmel |
| 1995–96 | Hapoel Ashkelon | Hapoel Marmorek, Hapoel Merhavim |
| 1996–97 | Hapoel Lod | Maccabi Shikun HaMizrah, Hapoel Kiryat Malakhi |
| 1997–98 | Beitar Be'er Sheva | Hapoel Kiryat Ono, Hapoel Yehud |
| 1998–99 | Hapoel Ironi Dimona ^{12} | Hapoel Yeruham, Beitar Ramla |
Fourth tier
| 1999–2000 | Maccabi Ashkelon ^{13} | Hapoel Or Yehuda |
| 2000–01 | Maccabi Yavne | Hapoel Ihud Tzeirei Jaffa, Sektzia Nes Tziona |
| 2001–02 | Maccabi Ramat Amidar | Hapoel Kiryat Ono, Hapoel Lod, Maccabi Jerusalem/Ma'ale Adumim |
| 2002–03 | Hapoel Tira ^{14} | None ^{15} |
| 2003–04 | Maccabi Be'er Sheva ^{16} | Hapoel Bat Yam |
| 2004–05 | Hapoel Bnei Lod | Hapoel Qalansawe, Hapoel Jaljulia |
| 2005–06 | Sektzia Nes Tziona | Maccabi Sha'arayim, F.C. Kafr Qasim, Beitar Givat Ze'ev |
| 2006–07 | Hapoel Maxim Lod ^{17} | AS Jaffa, Hapoel Arad |
| 2007–08 | Maccabi Ironi Bat Yam | Tzafririm Holon, Maccabi Amishav Petah Tikva, Ironi Ofakim |
| 2008–09 | Maccabi Be'er Sheva | Ironi Ramla, Hapoel Masos Shaqib al-Salam |
Third tier
| 2009–10 | Hapoel Herzliya | Beitar Kfar Saba, Hapoel Mevaseret Zion |
| 2010–11 | Hapoel Jerusalem | Hapoel Nahlat Yehuda, Tzafririm Holon, Shimshon Bnei Tayibe |
| 2011–12 | Maccabi Yavne | Maccabi Ironi Netivot, Maccabi HaShikma Ramat Hen, Maccabi Ironi Jatt Alahli |
| 2012–13 | Hapoel Katamon | Hapoel Arad, Maccabi Ironi Kfar Yona, Ortodoxim Lod |
| 2013–14 | Maccabi Kiryat Gat | Maccabi Be'er Ya'akov, Bnei Eilat |
| 2014–15 | Hapoel Ashkelon | Maccabi Be'er Sheva, Maccabi Kiryat Malakhi |
| 2015–16 | Maccabi Sha'arayim | Maccabi Amishav Petah Tikva, Bnei Eilat, Hapoel Morasha Ramat HaSharon |
| 2016–17 | Hapoel Marmorek | Bnei Jaffa Ortodoxim, F.C. Shikun HaMizrah |
| 2017–18 | Sektzia Nes Tziona | F.C. Dimona, Hapoel Hod HaSharon |
| 2018–19 | Hapoel Umm al-Fahm | Hapoel Jerusalem |

^{1} There was no automatic promotion in the 1973-74 season. Maccabi Sha'arayim finished sixth and bottom in the promotion play-offs and remained in Liga Alef.

^{2} SK Nes Tziona and Beitar Jaffa were reprieved from relegation after the Israel Football Association decided to expand Liga Leumit to 18 clubs and Liga Alef to 17 clubs in each division for the following season.

^{3} Hapoel Lod and Hapoel Bat Yam were also promoted.

^{4} Beitar Ramla were also promoted after play-off victory over runners-up of Liga Alef North, Hapoel Ramat HaSharon.

^{5} Hapoel Holon were also promoted after play-off victory over runners-up of Liga Alef North, Maccabi Hadera.

^{6} Hapoel Ramat HaSharon were also promoted after play-off victory over runners-up of Liga Alef North, Beitar Netanya.

^{7} Season played with 13 clubs after Tzafririm Holon merged with Liga Artzit club, Hapoel Holon.

^{8} Ironi Ashdod were also promoted after play-off victory over Maccabi Tamra of Liga Artzit.

^{9} Hakoah Ramat Gan were also promoted after play-off victory over Hapoel Bat Yam of Liga Artzit.

^{10} Hapoel Bat Yam were also promoted as runners-up.

^{11} Hapoel Lod were also promoted as runners-up.

^{12} Hapoel Ramat Gan, Maccabi Sha'arayim and Shimshon Tel Aviv were also promoted.

^{13} Hapoel Nir Ramat HaSharon were also promoted as the best runners-up in Liga Alef, following the merger of Liga Artzit clubs, Beitar Tel Aviv and Shimshon Tel Aviv.

^{14} Hapoel Marmorek were also promoted as the best runners-up in Liga Alef, after Beitar Be'er Sheva (which were relegated from Liga Leumit to Liga Artzit) folded.

^{15} No club relegated as both Beitar Be'er Sheva (which were relegated from Liga Leumit to Liga Artzit) and Hapoel Ironi Dimona folded.

^{16} Maccabi HaShikma Ramat Hen were also promoted as the best runners-up in Liga Alef, after Maccabi Kiryat Gat were demoted from Liga Leumit to Liga Alef.

^{17} Although Hapoel Maxim Lod finished top, they folded and second-placed Hapoel Kfar Shalem were promoted instead.
