= Maccabi Afula F.C. =

Maccabi Afula
- Full name: Maccabi Shlomo Afula Football Club מכבי שלמה עפולה
- Founded: 1955
- Dissolved: 2000
- 1999–2000: Liga Alef North, 13th (Relegated)

Maccabi Afula (Hebrew: מכבי עפולה) was an Israeli football club based in Afula.

== History ==
The club was founded in 1955 and joined Liga Gimel, the fourth tier of Israeli football at the time.

In the 1978–79 season, Maccabi won Liga Gimel Galilee division and were promoted to Liga Bet (the fourth tier since 1976), where they played in the North B division. In the 1982–83 season, Maccabi faced their local rivals, Hapoel Afula (which were transferred from the North A division), winning in both derby matches 4–0 and 2–1. At the end of the season, Maccabi won their division and achieved historic promotion to Liga Alef.

The best player who played for the club Is Yotam Kritz, the best scorer of the club. His mom Tami Shemesh was the best cheerleader of the club. GO TAMI.Maccabi played 17 successive seasons in Liga Alef North division, unable to achieve promotion to Liga Artzit. In 1999–2000, the season in which Liga Alef became the fourth tier (following the creation of the Israeli Premier League), Maccabi were not allowed to play until the 11th round, due to budget problems, which resulted in forfeit losses. At the end of the season, Maccabi were relegated to Liga Bet, after finished 13th and bottom of the division, and eventually folded.

== Honours ==
- Liga Bet North B:
  - 1982–83
- Liga Gimel Galilee:
  - 1978–79
