= 2006–07 Liga Gimel =

Israeli football season

The 2006–07 Liga Gimel season saw 84 clubs competing in 6 regional divisions for promotion to Liga Bet.

== Upper Galilee Division ==
Pos	Team	Pld	W	D	L	GF	GA	GD	Pts	Promotion
1	Ahi Acre	24	19	3	2	69	15	+54	60	Promoted to Liga Bet
2	F.C. Ahva Kafr Manda	24	17	1	6	67	27	+40	52	Promoted to Liga Bet
3	Hapoel Deir al-Asad	24	14	7	3	55	25	+30	49	
4	Hapoel Nahariya	24	15	3	6	72	29	+43	48	
5	Maccabi Bnei Nahf	24	12	6	6	37	28	+9	42	
6	Maccabi Bnei Reineh	24	13	3	8	49	48	+1	42	
7	Maccabi Majd al-Krum	24	12	2	10	45	44	+1	38	
8	Beitar Ma'alot	24	8	4	12	43	50	−7	28	
9	Hapoel Bnei Gush Halav	24	7	3	14	39	68	−29	24	
10	Hapoel Rehaniya	24	6	4	14	37	62	−25	22	
11	Hapoel Jatt Yanuh HaGlilit	24	5	2	17	22	58	−36	13 (Note: 4 points deducted.)	
12	Bnei Kisra	24	4	2	18	23	62	−39	13 (Note: 1 point deducted?)	
13	Hapoel Ironi Hatzor	24	1	6	17	24	66	−42	5	

Notes:
- F.C. Hurfeish and F.C. Julis registered to play in the league, but withdrew without playing.
- Beitar Abu Snan was dismissed from the league on 6 February 2007 after failing to appear to a match for the second time.
- Beitar Bi'ina was dismissed from the league on 6 February 2007 after failing to appear to a match.
- Hapoel Ironi Hatzor was dismissed from the league on 25 April 2007, after failing to appear for a second match in the season. As the dismissal was given with one match left in the season (not including rescheduled fixtures), the club kept its record in the league, and the rest of its fixtures were registered as a 0–2 loss.

== Jezreel Division ==
Pos	Team	Pld	W	D	L	GF	GA	GD	Pts	Qualification
1	Maccabi Beit She'an	30	26	2	2	105	18	+87	80	Promotion play-offs
2	Hapoel Kvalim Mesilot	30	26	2	2	84	19	+65	80	Promotion play-offs
3	Maccabi Neve Sha'anan	30	21	4	5	78	31	+47	67	
4	Hapoel Kaukab	30	22	1	7	66	22	+44	67	
5	Hapoel Ramot Menashe Megiddo	30	19	6	5	102	28	+74	63	
6	Hapoel al-Ittihad Nazareth	30	14	7	9	53	52	+1	49	
7	Hapoel Spartak Haifa	30	14	3	13	86	56	+30	45	
8	Hapoel Bnei Kababir	30	12	3	15	61	66	−5	39	
9	Hapoel Umm al-Ghanam/Nein	30	10	8	12	51	47	+4	37 (Note: 1 point deducted.)	
10	F.C. Kfar Kama	30	10	5	15	81	74	+7	35	
11	Hapoel Bnei Nazareth	30	7	4	19	43	79	−36	25	
12	Hapoel Ka'abiyye	30	7	2	21	33	90	−57	21 (Note: 2 points deducted.)	
13	Beitar al-Amal Nazareth	30	6	4	20	46	132	−86	21	
14	Hapoel Kafr Sulam	30	6	2	22	34	114	−80	20	
15	Maccabi Bnei Ilut	30	3	7	20	24	82	−58	16	
16	Beitar F.C. Tabash	30	2	10	18	31	68	−37	13 (Note: 3 points deducted.)	

=== Promotion play-offs ===
As Maccabi Beit She'an and Hapoel Kvalim Mesilot finished level on points and matches won, the two clubs met in a playoff match to determine the league winner and promoted club to Liga Bet.

5 May 2006	Hapoel Kvalim Mesilot	2–5	Maccabi Beit She'an	Ilut
16:00 (IDT)	Mohammad Zoabi 30', 53'	Report (in Hebrew)	Erez Krakogali 23', 50', 82'; Mohammad Zoabi 40'; Amitai Dahan 89'	Stadium: Ilut Stadium; Referee: Liran Wachsberger

Maccabi Beit She'an promoted to Liga Bet. During the summer, as Hapoel Reineh folded, Hapoel Kvalim Mesilot was promoted as well.

== Samaria Division ==
Pos	Team	Pld	W	D	L	GF	GA	GD	Pts	Promotion
1	Maccabi Ironi Barta'a	26	23	3	0	95	16	+79	72	Promoted to Liga Bet
2	Hapoel Bnei Jisr az-Zarqa	26	22	1	3	61	15	+46	67	
3	Beitar Afula	26	17	4	5	52	28	+24	55	
4	Maccabi HaSharon Netanya	26	16	2	8	75	34	+41	50	
5	Maccabi Fureidis	26	13	4	9	46	29	+17	43	
6	Maccabi Ahi Iksal	26	13	2	11	52	46	+6	41	
7	Beitar Hadera	26	11	0	15	54	67	−13	33	
8	Maccabi Jisr az-Zarqa	26	9	5	12	36	47	−11	32	
9	Beitar Umm al-Fahm	26	8	6	12	38	45	−7	30	
10	Beitar Tubruk	26	7	8	11	31	48	−17	29	
11	Hapoel Bnei Zemer	26	5	4	17	29	59	−30	19	
12	Hapoel Bnei Musmus	26	4	6	16	29	59	−30	18	
13	Maccabi Ironi Jatt	26	4	6	16	35	74	−39	18	
14	Hapoel Muawiya	26	2	5	19	24	82	−58	11	

== Sharon Division ==
Pos	Team	Pld	W	D	L	GF	GA	GD	Pts	Promotion
1	Hapoel Pardesiya	20	13	5	2	63	17	+46	44	Promoted to Liga Bet
2	F.C. Tira	20	14	1	5	42	18	+24	43	
3	Beitar Ironi Ariel	20	12	1	7	33	25	+8	37	
4	Hapoel Aliyah Kfar Saba	20	11	3	6	68	32	+36	36	
5	F.C. Bnei Ra'anana	20	11	2	7	46	31	+15	35	
6	Hapoel Kafr Bara	20	10	3	7	35	28	+7	33	
7	Hapoel Bik'at HaYarden	20	9	1	10	28	32	−4	28	
8	Beitar Jaffa	20	7	3	10	33	42	−9	24	
9	Beitar Oranit	20	5	6	9	21	39	−18	21	
10	Hapoel Kafr Qasim Shouaa	20	4	0	16	26	59	−33	12	
11	Ironi Ariel	20	1	1	18	12	84	−72	4	

== Tel Aviv Division ==
Pos	Team	Pld	W	D	L	GF	GA	GD	Pts	Promotion
1	F.C. Ironi Or Yehuda	30	24	6	0	131	15	+116	78	Promoted to Liga Bet
2	Ortodoxim Jaffa	30	24	2	4	109	25	+84	74	Promoted to Liga Bet
3	Maccabi Ironi Or Yehuda	30	20	3	7	91	44	+47	63	
4	F.C. Shikun HaMizrach	30	19	5	6	81	34	+47	62	
5	Ironi Beit Dagan	30	17	5	8	91	55	+36	56	
6	Hapoel Kiryat Shalom	30	16	3	11	81	55	+26	51	
7	Maccabi Yehud	30	14	8	8	62	32	+30	50	
8	Hapoel Neve Golan	30	14	3	13	65	57	+8	45	
9	Elitzur Yehud	30	11	7	12	50	61	−11	40	
10	Brit Sport Ma'of	30	10	4	16	62	101	−39	34	
11	Elitzur Jaffa Tel Aviv	30	10	3	17	52	92	−40	33	
12	A.S. Holon	30	9	4	17	47	81	−34	31	
13	Beitar Pardes Katz	30	9	5	16	41	52	−11	29 (Note: 3 points deducted.)	
14	Beitar Ezra	30	5	3	22	40	98	−58	18	
15	Maccabi Dynamo Holon	30	3	2	25	35	120	−85	7 (Note: 4 points deducted.)	
16	Hapoel Ramla	30	3	1	26	30	146	−116	6	

== Central-South Division ==
Pos	Team	Pld	W	D	L	GF	GA	GD	Pts	Promotion
1	Bnei Eilat	20	16	1	3	52	9	+43	49	Promoted to Liga Bet
2	F.C. Be'er Sheva	20	13	2	5	46	24	+22	41	Promoted to Liga Bet
3	Hapoel Rahat	20	13	0	7	43	29	+14	39	
4	Hapoel F.C. Hevel Modi'in	20	12	2	6	48	28	+20	38	
5	Ironi Beit Shemesh	20	12	3	5	39	23	+16	38 (Note: 1 point deducted?)	
6	Beitar Ashkelon	20	11	1	8	51	42	+9	34	
7	Maccabi Rehovot	20	5	5	10	33	57	−24	20	
8	Hapoel Ar'arat an-Naqab	20	4	7	9	23	48	−25	16 (Note: 3 points deducted.)	
9	Hapoel Hura	20	5	0	15	17	47	−30	15	
10	Ortodoxim Lod	20	3	2	15	21	42	−21	11	
11	Maccabi Lod	20	2	5	13	18	42	−24	11	
