= 1982–83 Liga Bet =

Israeli football season

The 1982–83 Liga Bet season saw Maccabi Ahi Nazareth, Maccabi Afula, Hapoel Ihud Tzeirei Jaffa and Maccabi Lazarus Holon win their regional divisions and promoted to Liga Alef.

At the bottom, Sektzia Ma'alot, Hapoel Bnei Rameh (from North A division), Beitar al-Amal Nazareth (from North B division), Beitar Hod HaSharon, Beitar Beit Dagan (from South A division), Hapoel Ofakim and Hapoel Gedera (from South B division) were all automatically relegated to Liga Gimel, whilst Hapoel Netanya (from North B division) folded during the season.

== North Division A ==
Pos	Team	Pld	W	D	L	GF	GA	GD	Pts	Promotion or relegation
1	Maccabi Ahi Nazareth	26	–	–	–	55	25	+30	38	Promoted to Liga Alef
2	Maccabi Kiryat Bialik	26	–	–	–	41	22	+19	37	
3	Hapoel Nahariya	26	–	–	–	47	28	+19	32	
4	Maccabi Acre	25	–	–	–	39	29	+10	31	
5	Hapoel Makr	26	–	–	–	44	44	0	30	
6	Maccabi Tamra	25	–	–	–	51	33	+18	29	
7	Hapoel Ein Mahil	26	–	–	–	39	41	−2	27	
8	Hapoel Bnei Tamra	25	–	–	–	41	41	0	25	
9	Hapoel Bnei Acre	25	–	–	–	32	31	+1	23	
10	Hapoel Afikim	26	–	–	–	27	42	−15	20	
11	Hapoel Safed	26	–	–	–	34	41	−7	16	
12	Hapoel Kafr Sumei	26	–	–	–	30	48	−18	16	
13	Sektzia Ma'alot	26	–	–	–	27	41	−14	14	Relegated to Liga Gimel
14	Hapoel Bnei Rameh	26	–	–	–	16	60	−44	11	Relegated to Liga Gimel

== North Division B ==
Pos	Team	Pld	W	D	L	GF	GA	GD	Pts	Promotion or relegation
1	Maccabi Afula	24	–	–	–	59	24	+35	38	Promoted to Liga Alef
2	Maccabi Or Akiva	24	–	–	–	47	25	+22	34	
3	Hapoel Kafr Sulam	24	–	–	–	44	38	+6	27	
4	Hapoel Tayibe	24	–	–	–	26	28	−2	27	
5	Hapoel Afula	24	–	–	–	36	32	+4	26	
6	Hapoel Umm al-Fahm	22	–	–	–	41	31	+10	25	
7	Hapoel Baqa al-Gharbiyye	24	–	–	–	28	35	−7	24	
8	Hapoel Daliyat al-Karmel	24	–	–	–	34	42	−8	23	
9	Hapoel Kafr Qara	24	–	–	–	25	36	−11	19	
10	Hapoel HaTzair Kiryat Haim	24	–	–	–	18	30	−12	19	
11	Hapoel Emek Hefer	24	–	–	–	39	46	−7	17	
12	Hapoel Aliyah Kfar Saba	23	–	–	–	31	38	−7	13	
13	Beitar al-Amal Nazareth	23	–	–	–	30	61	−31	10	Relegated to Liga Gimel

Hapoel Netanya folded during the season.

== South Division A ==
Pos	Team	Pld	W	D	L	GF	GA	GD	Pts	Promotion or relegation
1	Hapoel Ihud Tzeirei Jaffa	26	–	–	–	46	21	+25	41	Promoted to Liga Alef
2	Maccabi HaShikma Ramat Gan	26	–	–	–	68	28	+40	39	
3	Hapoel Tira	26	–	–	–	37	17	+20	31	
4	Hapoel Neve Golan	26	–	–	–	32	27	+5	31	
5	Hapoel Jaljulia	26	–	–	–	45	25	+20	29	
6	Hapoel Mahane Yehuda	26	–	–	–	27	27	0	26	
7	Hapoel Rosh HaAyin	26	–	–	–	30	32	−2	25	
8	Hapoel Kafr Qasim	26	–	–	–	35	38	−3	25	
9	Hapoel Herzliya	26	–	–	–	27	30	−3	22	
10	Hapoel Tel Mond	26	–	–	–	28	40	−12	21	
11	Hapoel Or Yehuda	26	–	–	–	27	42	−15	21	
12	Hapoel Kfar Shalem	26	–	–	–	23	45	−22	19	
13	Beitar Hod HaSharon	26	–	–	–	35	45	−10	18	Relegated to Liga Gimel
14	Beitar Beit Dagan	26	–	–	–	25	71	−46	12	Relegated to Liga Gimel

== South Division B ==
Pos	Team	Pld	W	D	L	GF	GA	GD	Pts	Promotion or relegation
1	Maccabi Lazarus Holon	26	–	–	–	43	9	+34	43	Promoted to Liga Alef
2	Hapoel Kiryat Malakhi	26	–	–	–	45	16	+29	37	
3	Hapoel Sderot	25	–	–	–	42	39	+3	30	
4	Maccabi Rehovot	26	–	–	–	32	35	−3	28	
5	SK Nes Tziona	26	–	–	–	23	27	−4	25	
6	Hapoel Merhavim	26	–	–	–	36	37	−1	24	
7	Maccabi Be'er Sheva	26	–	–	–	23	27	−4	24	
8	Beitar Lod	25	–	–	–	23	23	0	23	
9	Beitar Kiryat Gat	26	–	–	–	32	36	−4	23	
10	Maccabi Ashkelon	26	–	–	–	29	33	−4	23	
11	Hapoel Be'er Ya'akov	26	–	–	–	27	32	−5	23	
12	Maccabi Kiryat Ekron	25	–	–	–	28	38	−10	21	
13	Hapoel Ofakim	26	–	–	–	25	38	−13	19	Relegated to Liga Gimel
14	Hapoel Gedera	25	–	–	–	25	44	−19	17	Relegated to Liga Gimel
