= 1981–82 Liga Gimel =

Israeli football season

The 1981–82 Liga Gimel season saw 107 clubs competing in 8 regional divisions for promotion to Liga Bet.

Hapoel Kafr Sumei, Hapoel Bnei Tamra, Beitar al-Amal Nazareth, Hapoel Baqa al-Gharbiyye, Beitar Hod HaSharon, Beitar Beit Dagan, Maccabi Kiryat Ekron and Beitar Kiryat Gat won their regional divisions and promoted to Liga Bet.

== Galilee Division ==
Pos	Team	Pld	W	D	L	GF	GA	GD	Pts	Promotion
1	Hapoel Kafr Sumei (Note: Although the season ended at 15 May 1982, Hapoel Kafr Sumei - Maccabi Tur'an match was postponed to 24 July 1982, first due to an automobile accident involving Hapoel Kafr Sumei players, and later due to the outbreak of the 1982 Lebanon War. Hapoel Kafr Sumei won the match 6-2 and promoted to Liga Bet.)	22	–	–	–	61	20	+41	33	Promoted to Liga Bet
2	Beitar Kiryat Shmona	22	–	–	–	–	–	—	33	
3	Maccabi Tur'an	22	–	–	–	–	–	—	31	
4	Beitar Ma'alot	22	–	–	–	48	24	+24	30	
5	Hapoel Karmiel	–	–	–	–	–	–	—	24	
6	Hapoel Kafr Kanna	–	–	–	–	–	–	—	22	
7	Maccabi Tiberias	–	–	–	–	–	–	—	19	
8	Hapoel Ma'ale Yosef	–	–	–	–	–	–	—	18	
9	Maccabi Safed	22	–	–	–	25	45	−20	15	
10	Hapoel Shlomi	–	–	–	–	–	–	—	12	
11	Beitar Tiberias	–	–	–	–	–	–	—	10	
12	Tzofei Sakhnin	–	–	–	–	–	–	—	10	

== Bay Division ==
Pos	Team	Pld	W	D	L	GF	GA	GD	Pts	Promotion
1	Hapoel Bnei Tamra	21	–	–	–	62	13	+49	37	Promoted to Liga Bet
2	Hapoel Majd al-Krum	20	–	–	–	60	18	+42	35	
3	Hapoel Deir al-Asad	21	–	–	–	36	35	+1	26	
4	Hapoel Bu'eine	19	–	–	–	23	18	+5	25	
5	Hapoel Bnei Mazra'a	–	–	–	–	45	48	−3	25	
6	Maccabi Tzur Shalom	20	–	–	–	31	41	−10	22	
7	Bnei Sakhnin	22	–	–	–	41	31	+10	21	
8	Maccabi Tel Hanan	21	–	–	–	25	33	−8	18	
9	Hapoel Abu Snan	14	–	–	–	27	20	+7	16	
10	Hapoel Halissa	17	–	–	–	30	32	−2	14	
11	Hapoel I'billin	20	–	–	–	35	32	+3	13	
12	Beitar Shefa-'Amr	19	–	–	–	24	35	−11	10	
13	Hapoel Jadeidi	18	–	–	–	19	54	−35	10	

== Haifa Division ==
Pos	Team	Pld	W	D	L	GF	GA	GD	Pts	Promotion
1	Beitar al-Amal Nazareth	25	–	–	–	55	19	+36	40	Promoted to Liga Bet
2	Hapoel Yafa	24	–	–	–	62	16	+46	36	
3	Hapoel Daburiyya	22	–	–	–	50	14	+36	35	
4	Hapoel Ahva Haifa	23	–	–	–	47	24	+23	34	
5	Hapoel Iksal	21	–	–	–	29	24	+5	28	
6	Haifa Club	23	–	–	–	39	47	−8	23	
7	Maccabi Kafr Kanna	19	–	–	–	43	19	+24	20	
8	Hapoel Bnei Kababir	21	–	–	–	27	34	−7	18	
9	Hapoel Ta'anachim	21	–	–	–	39	27	+12	18	
10	Hapoel Bir al-Gaish	19	–	–	–	19	54	−35	10	
11	Beitar Tur'an	20	–	–	–	22	34	−12	9	
12	Hapoel Arraba	22	–	–	–	27	72	−45	9	
13	Maccabi Daliyat al-Karmel	11	–	–	–	7	25	−18	4	
14	Hapoel Kfar Kama	15	–	–	–	3	39	−36	2	

== Samaria Division ==
Pos	Team	Pld	W	D	L	GF	GA	GD	Pts	Promotion
1	Hapoel Baqa al-Gharbiyye	24	–	–	–	72	24	+48	42	Promoted to Liga Bet
2	Hapoel Jatt	25	–	–	–	66	21	+45	40	
3	Hapoel Binyamina	26	–	–	–	50	32	+18	33	
4	Maccabi Pardes Hanna	25	–	–	–	48	35	+13	26	
5	Hapoel Yokneam	22	–	–	–	58	48	+10	24	
6	Hapoel Caesarea	20	–	–	–	30	41	−11	23	
7	Beitar Pardes Hanna	20	–	–	–	37	27	+10	22	
8	Hapoel Geva HaCarmel	23	–	–	–	51	50	+1	22	
9	Maccabi Zikhron Ya'akov	22	–	–	–	41	44	−3	20	
10	Hapoel Atlit	23	–	–	–	41	61	−20	19	
11	Hapoel Lehavot Haviva	19	–	–	–	35	23	+12	16	
12	Beitar Binyamina	21	–	–	–	28	51	−23	16	
13	Hapoel Muawiya	16	–	–	–	16	50	−34	6	
14	Hapoel Musmus	16	–	–	–	13	63	−50	6	

== Sharon Division ==
Pos	Team	Pld	W	D	L	GF	GA	GD	Pts	Promotion
1	Beitar Hod HaSharon	26	–	–	–	57	34	+23	39	Promoted to Liga Bet
2	Elitzur Bar Ilan	26	–	–	–	42	31	+11	32	
3	Beitar Kfar Saba	26	–	–	–	31	27	+4	31	
4	Hapoel Elyakhin	23	–	–	–	33	21	+12	29	
5	Maccabi Ramat HaSharon	25	–	–	–	40	48	−8	28	
6	Hapoel Pardesiya	23	–	–	–	44	46	−2	27	
7	Hapoel Qalansawe	25	–	–	–	26	33	−7	27	
8	Maccabi Kafr Qasim	24	–	–	–	29	22	+7	22	
9	Hapoel Hod HaSharon	26	–	–	–	28	28	0	22	
10	Beitar Rosh HaAyin	25	–	–	–	23	37	−14	21	
11	Beitar Kfar Yona	24	–	–	–	19	24	−5	20	
12	Hapoel Sdei Hemed	25	–	–	–	37	47	−10	15	
13	Hapoel Barta'a	22	–	–	–	34	49	−15	15	
14	Maccabi Amidar Netanya	23	–	–	–	31	62	−31	12	

== Dan Division ==
Pos	Team	Pld	W	D	L	GF	GA	GD	Pts	Promotion
1	Beitar Beit Dagan	26	–	–	–	70	34	+36	37	Promoted to Liga Bet
2	Maccabi Shikun HaMizrah	26	–	–	–	72	38	+34	36	
3	Beitar Mahane Yehuda	26	–	–	–	48	29	+19	32	
4	Hapoel HaTzafon Tel Aviv	26	–	–	–	51	43	+8	32	
5	Beitar Jaffa	25	–	–	–	49	42	+7	31	
6	Maccabi Ben Zvi	26	–	–	–	40	35	+5	27	
7	Beitar Kiryat Ono	26	–	–	–	48	45	+3	27	
8	M.M. Givat Shmuel	25	–	–	–	36	40	−4	25	
9	Maccabi Ramat Hen	26	–	–	–	42	47	−5	24	
10	Beitar Bat Yam	26	–	–	–	35	45	−10	23	
11	Maccabi Yehud	26	–	–	–	39	51	−12	22	
12	Hapoel Amishav Petah Tikva	26	–	–	–	30	37	−7	17	
13	Beitar Holon	26	–	–	–	24	36	−12	16	
14	Maccabi Bat Yam	26	–	–	–	33	58	−25	15	

== Central Division ==
Pos	Team	Pld	W	D	L	GF	GA	GD	Pts	Promotion
1	Maccabi Kiryat Ekron	24	–	–	–	–	–	—	37	Promoted to Liga Bet
2	Hapoel Bnei Lod	24	–	–	–	42	24	+18	32	
3	Beitar Katamonim	21	–	–	–	43	14	+29	29	
4	Maccabi Jerusalem	–	–	–	–	57	43	+14	29	
5	Maccabi Beit Shemesh	–	–	–	–	42	39	+3	28	
6	ASA Jerusalem	–	–	–	–	44	27	+17	27	
7	Beitar Beit Shemesh	22	–	–	–	47	43	+4	27	
8	Beitar Yavne	22	–	–	–	34	41	−7	22	
9	Hapoel Azrikam	–	–	–	–	31	35	−4	21	
10	Maccabi Kiryat Malakhi	–	–	–	–	26	39	−13	19	
11	Hapoel Nahlat Yehuda	23	–	–	–	28	38	−10	18	
12	Hapoel Rakevet Lod	24	–	–	–	17	54	−37	14	
13	Maccabi Ramla	24	–	–	–	18	54	−36	2	

== South Division ==
Pos	Team	Pld	W	D	L	GF	GA	GD	Pts	Promotion
1	Beitar Kiryat Gat	–	–	–	–	59	17	+42	44	Promoted to Liga Bet
2	Hapoel Eilat	–	–	–	–	75	19	+56	42	
3	Beitar Ashkelon	–	–	–	–	65	16	+49	41	
4	Hapoel Kiryat Gat	24	–	–	–	52	21	+31	36	
5	Hapoel Arad	23	–	–	–	53	30	+23	28	
6	Hapoel Bnei Lakhish	24	–	–	–	50	32	+18	26	
7	Hapoel Bnei Shimon	23	–	–	–	35	38	−3	23	
8	Maccabi Dimona	23	–	–	–	27	32	−5	20	
9	Hapoel Be'eri	22	–	–	–	29	41	−12	15	
10	Hapoel Netivot	23	–	–	–	41	76	−35	14	
11	Beitar Ofakim	21	–	–	–	38	32	+6	13	
12	Hapoel Mitzpe Ramon	22	–	–	–	19	58	−39	9	
13	Hapoel Beit Shikma	16	–	–	–	14	45	−31	2	

== See also ==
- 1981–82 Liga Leumit
- 1981–82 Liga Artzit
- 1981–82 Liga Alef
- 1981–82 Liga Bet
