= 1969–70 Liga Bet =

Israeli football season

The 1969–70 Liga Bet season saw Hapoel Nahariya, Hapoel Zikhron Ya'akov, and Hapoel Yehud win their regional divisions and promoted to Liga Alef. Hapoel Beit Shemesh, which placed third in South Division B was also promoted, as the top two clubs, Hapoel Ramla and Hapoel Ashdod were involved in match-fixing scandal, and as a result, both clubs were disqualified by the IFA.

== North Division A ==
Pos	Team	Pld	W	D	L	GF	GA	GD	Pts	Promotion or relegation
1	Hapoel Nahariya	28	–	–	–	103	18	+85	51	Promoted to Liga Alef
2	Hapoel Migdal HaEmek	28	–	–	–	78	21	+57	48	
3	Hapoel Afikim	28	–	–	–	64	48	+16	34	
4	Hapoel Sde Nahum\Beit She'an (Note: Hapoel Sde Nahum merged with Hapoel Beit She'an.)	28	–	–	–	57	58	−1	30	
5	Hapoel Safed	28	–	–	–	49	54	−5	27	
6	Beitar Tel Hanan	28	–	–	–	49	55	−6	27	
7	Hapoel Tel Hanan	28	–	–	–	45	52	−7	26	
8	Beitar Tiberias	28	–	–	–	49	59	−10	25	
9	Hapoel Afula	28	–	–	–	43	44	−1	24	
10	Hapoel Kiryat Yam	28	–	–	–	58	71	−13	24	
11	Beitar Kiryat Shmona	28	–	–	–	40	49	−9	23	
12	Hapoel Kiryat Ata	28	–	–	–	43	53	−10	23	
13	Hapoel Shefa-'Amr	28	–	–	–	50	68	−18	22	
14	Beitar Nahariya	28	–	–	–	49	63	−14	20	
15	Hapoel Ein Harod (Note: Hapoel Ramat David relocated to Ein Harod after playing 14 matches, and renamed Hapoel Ein Harod.)	28	–	–	–	46	107	−61	14	Relegated to Liga Gimel

Notes:

Hapoel Kfar Blum withdrew from the league and folded.

== North Division B ==
Pos	Team	Pld	W	D	L	GF	GA	GD	Pts	Promotion or relegation
1	Hapoel Zikhron Ya'akov	30	–	–	–	68	30	+38	44	Promoted to Liga Alef
2	Hapoel Givat Haim	30	–	–	–	90	59	+31	43	
3	Hapoel Beit Eliezer	30	–	–	–	54	31	+23	37	
4	Hapoel Caesarea	30	–	–	–	49	41	+8	34	
5	Hapoel Tel Mond	30	–	–	–	63	58	+5	32	
6	Hapoel Ra'anana	30	–	–	–	52	49	+3	32	
7	Maccabi Pardes Hanna	30	–	–	–	43	40	+3	32	
8	Beitar Dov Netanya	30	–	–	–	49	54	−5	30	
9	Hapoel Binyamina	30	–	–	–	47	51	−4	29	
10	Beitar Binyamina	30	–	–	–	48	55	−7	29	
11	Hapoel Givat Olga	30	–	–	–	32	33	−1	26	
12	Beitar Tirat HaCarmel	30	–	–	–	47	49	−2	26	
13	Maccabi Zikhron Ya'akov	30	–	–	–	46	52	−6	25	
14	M.S. Even Yehuda	30	–	–	–	48	64	−16	24	
15	Hapoel Atlit	30	–	–	–	44	66	−22	23	Relegated to Liga Gimel
16	Maccabi Neve Sha'anan	30	–	–	–	32	80	−48	14	Relegated to Liga Gimel

== South Division A ==
Pos	Team	Pld	W	D	L	GF	GA	GD	Pts	Promotion or relegation
1	Hapoel Yehud	30	–	–	–	81	18	+63	51	Promoted to Liga Alef
2	Hapoel Kfar Shalem	30	–	–	–	76	18	+58	49	
3	Beitar Holon	30	–	–	–	62	49	+13	42	
4	Maccabi Bat Yam	30	–	–	–	50	21	+29	41	
5	Maccabi Holon	30	–	–	–	50	36	+14	33	
6	Beitar Ramat Gan	30	–	–	–	46	42	+4	31	
7	Hapoel Rosh HaAyin	30	–	–	–	43	47	−4	30	
8	Hapoel Shikun HaMizrah	30	–	–	–	44	49	−5	29	
9	Hapoel Ganei Tikva	30	–	–	–	42	48	−6	26	
10	Maccabi HaShikma Ramat Gan	29	–	–	–	33	39	−6	26	
11	Hapoel Kiryat Shalom	30	–	–	–	58	67	−9	26	
12	Hapoel Or Yehuda	30	–	–	–	42	54	−12	25	
13	Hapoel HaTzafon Tel Aviv	30	–	–	–	52	59	−7	23	
14	Hapoel Ramat HaSharon	30	–	–	–	27	47	−20	23	
15	Hapoel Qalansawe	29	–	–	–	39	90	−51	16	Relegated to Liga Gimel
16	Maccabi Shmuel Tel Aviv	30	–	–	–	12	86	−74	4	Relegated to Liga Gimel

== South Division B ==
Pos	Team	Pld	W	D	L	GF	GA	GD	Pts	Promotion or relegation
1	Hapoel Ramla	30	–	–	–	83	17	+66	49 (Note: Hapoel Ramla - Maccabi Dror Lod result, which ended 13-0, remained as is, despite suspicions of bribery in the match. however the IFA still disqualified Hapoel Ramla from Liga Alef promotion.)	Disqualified
2	Hapoel Ashdod	30	–	–	–	82	18	+64	48 (Note: 1 point deducted.) (Note: No points or goals were awarded for Hapoel Ashdod - Beitar Rehovot due to suspicions of bribery in the match, which ended 14-0.)	Disqualified
3	Hapoel Beit Shemesh	30	–	–	–	61	32	+29	37	Promoted to Liga Alef
4	Maccabi Ashkelon	30	–	–	–	57	42	+15	34	
5	Maccabi Rehovot	30	–	–	–	61	51	+10	34	
6	Hapoel Ofakim	30	–	–	–	36	34	+2	34 (Note: No points or goals were awarded for Hapoel Merhavim - Hapoel Ofakim due to suspicions of bribery in the match, which ended 2-0.)	
7	Hapoel Kiryat Malakhi	30	–	–	–	38	39	−1	32	
8	Hapoel Dimona	30	–	–	–	42	34	+8	31	
9	Maccabi Be'er Sheva	30	–	–	–	50	43	+7	29	
10	Beitar Rehovot	30	–	–	–	35	57	−22	24	
11	HaBira Jerusalem	30	–	–	–	41	58	−17	23	
12	Maccabi Ramla	30	–	–	–	32	44	−12	22 (Note: No points or goals were awarded for Hapoel Kiryat Gat - Maccabi Ramla due to suspicions of bribery in the match, which ended 10-0.)	
13	Maccabi Kfar Gvirol	30	–	–	–	47	75	−28	21	
14	Hapoel Merhavim	30	–	–	–	35	56	−21	18	
15	Hapoel Kiryat Gat	30	–	–	–	36	64	−28	18	Relegated to Liga Gimel
16	Maccabi Dror Lod	30	–	–	–	33	106	−73	13	Relegated to Liga Gimel
