= 1977–78 Liga Bet =

Israeli football season

The 1977–78 Liga Bet season saw Hapoel Kiryat Ata, Hapoel Givat Olga, Hapoel Kafr Qasim and Maccabi Kiryat Gat win their regional divisions and promoted to Liga Alef.

Second placed clubs, Maccabi Ahi Nazareth, Hapoel Givat Haim, Maccabi Lazarus Holon and Hapoel Dimona were also promoted, as both Liga Leumit and Liga Artzit were expanded to 16 clubs in each league.

== North Division A ==
Pos	Team	Pld	W	D	L	GF	GA	GD	Pts	Promotion or relegation
1	Hapoel Kiryat Ata	26	–	–	–	52	16	+36	44	Promoted to Liga Alef
2	Maccabi Ahi Nazareth	26	–	–	–	54	24	+30	36	Promoted to Liga Alef
3	Hapoel Safed	26	–	–	–	47	28	+19	30	
4	Hapoel Kfar Kama	26	–	–	–	36	31	+5	30	
5	Maccabi Hatzor	26	–	–	–	30	33	−3	27	
6	Maccabi Neve Sha'anan	26	–	–	–	34	44	−10	26	
7	Hapoel Sakhnin	25	–	–	–	49	39	+10	24	
8	Maccabi Tiberias	26	–	–	–	33	41	−8	24	
9	Beitar Kiryat Shmona	26	–	–	–	34	39	−5	22	
10	Sektzia Ma'alot	26	–	–	–	34	45	−11	21	
11	Maccabi Kiryat Bialik	26	–	–	–	22	37	−15	21	
12	Hapoel Hatzor	26	–	–	–	28	45	−17	21	
13	Beitar Nahariya	26	–	–	–	26	42	−16	19	Relegated to Liga Gimel
14	Hapoel Majd al-Krum	25	–	–	–	29	46	−17	16	Relegated to Liga Gimel

== North Division B ==
Pos	Team	Pld	W	D	L	GF	GA	GD	Pts	Promotion or relegation
1	Hapoel Givat Olga	25	–	–	–	40	16	+24	38	Promoted to Liga Alef
2	Hapoel Givat Haim	26	–	–	–	55	33	+22	36	Promoted to Liga Alef
3	Hapoel Migdal HaEmek	26	–	–	–	50	29	+21	33	
4	Hapoel Umm al-Fahm	26	–	–	–	51	37	+14	31	
5	Hapoel Tayibe	25	–	–	–	30	22	+8	29	
6	Hapoel Kafr Qara	26	–	–	–	28	35	−7	26	
7	Hapoel Kafr Sulam	25	–	–	–	38	38	0	23	
8	Maccabi Zikhron Ya'akov	26	–	–	–	49	49	0	22	
9	Hapoel HaTzair Haifa	26	–	–	–	39	50	−11	21	
10	Maccabi HaSharon Netanya	26	–	–	–	27	38	−11	21	
11	Hapoel Kiryat Yam	26	–	–	–	36	53	−17	21	
12	Hapoel Aliyah Kfar Saba	26	–	–	–	36	54	−18	21	
13	Hapoel Geva HaCarmel	25	–	–	–	37	43	−6	18	Relegated to Liga Gimel
14	Hapoel Binyamina	26	–	–	–	26	45	−19	16	Relegated to Liga Gimel

== South Division A ==
Pos	Team	Pld	W	D	L	GF	GA	GD	Pts	Promotion or relegation
1	Hapoel Kafr Qasim	26	–	–	–	51	18	+33	43	Promoted to Liga Alef
2	Lazarus Holon	26	–	–	–	47	28	+19	36	Promoted to Liga Alef
3	Hapoel Ramat HaSharon	26	–	–	–	47	34	+13	28	
4	Beitar Bat Yam	26	–	–	–	30	31	−1	26	
5	Beitar Jaffa	26	–	–	–	21	33	−12	25	
6	Tzafririm Holon	26	–	–	–	38	35	+3	24	
7	Hapoel Ganei Tikva	26	–	–	–	31	35	−4	24	
8	Hapoel Kfar Shalem	26	–	–	–	27	34	−7	24	
9	Beitar Herzliya	26	–	–	–	30	38	−8	24	
10	Beitar Holon	26	–	–	–	30	27	+3	23	
11	Hapoel Mahane Yehuda	26	–	–	–	37	36	+1	23	
12	Hapoel Be'er Ya'akov	26	–	–	–	45	45	0	23	
13	Beitar Mahane Yehuda	26	–	–	–	28	37	−9	23	Relegated to Liga Gimel
14	Beitar Ramat Gan	26	–	–	–	29	54	−25	17	Relegated to Liga Gimel

== South Division B ==
Pos	Team	Pld	W	D	L	GF	GA	GD	Pts	Promotion or relegation
1	Maccabi Kiryat Gat	26	–	–	–	44	26	+18	37	Promoted to Liga Alef
2	Hapoel Dimona	26	–	–	–	47	28	+19	36	Promoted to Liga Alef
3	Beitar Be'er Sheva	26	–	–	–	44	28	+16	33	
4	Hapoel Merhavim	26	–	–	–	47	25	+22	32	
5	Hapoel Yeruham	26	–	–	–	28	34	−6	27	
6	Hapoel Gedera	26	–	–	–	46	38	+8	25	
7	Beitar Katamonim	26	–	–	–	32	38	−6	25	
8	Maccabi Rehovot	26	–	–	–	46	42	+4	24	
9	Maccabi Ashkelon	26	–	–	–	42	45	−3	23	
10	Maccabi Ramla	26	–	–	–	37	41	−4	23	
11	Hapoel Ofakim	26	–	–	–	27	41	−14	23	
12	Hapoel Kiryat Malakhi	26	–	–	–	38	40	−2	22	
13	Hapoel Eilat	26	–	–	–	33	51	−18	19	Relegated to Liga Gimel
14	Hapoel Kiryat Gat	26	–	–	–	18	51	−33	13	Relegated to Liga Gimel
