= 1962–63 Liga Gimel =

Israeli football season

The 1962–63 Liga Gimel season saw 158 clubs competing in 14 regional divisions for promotion to Liga Bet.

Beitar Safed, Beitar Nahariya, Hapoel Migdal HaEmek, Shefa-'Amr Club, Hapoel Tirat HaCarmel, F.C. Even Yehuda, Maccabi Herzliya, Beitar Ezra, Hapoel Bnei Zion, Hapoel HaTzafon Jerusalem, Beitar Ekron, Maccabi Ashkelon, Hapoel Avraham Be'er Sheva and Hapoel Dorot won their regional divisions and promoted to Liga Bet.

Second placed clubs, Hapoel Afikim, Beitar Acre, Hapoel Pardesiya, Hapoel Kfar Shalem and Hapoel Shikun HaMizrah were also promoted.

== Eastern Galilee Division ==
| Pos | Team | Pld | W | D | L | GF | GA | GD | Pts | Promotion |
|---|---|---|---|---|---|---|---|---|---|---|
| 1 | Beitar Safed | 14 | – | – | – | 37 | 6 | +31 | 23 | Promoted to Liga Bet |
| 2 | Hapoel Kfar Giladi | 14 | – | – | – | 30 | 13 | +17 | 20 | |
| 3 | Hapoel Hulata | 14 | – | – | – | 28 | 30 | −2 | 15 | |
| 4 | Nevatim Safed | 14 | – | – | – | 17 | 23 | −6 | 15 | |
| 5 | Hapoel Ayelet HaShahar | 14 | – | – | – | 36 | 23 | +13 | 14 | |
| 6 | Hapoel Dan | 14 | – | – | – | 23 | 26 | −3 | 8 | |
| 7 | Beitar Tiberias | 14 | – | – | – | 24 | 48 | −24 | 8 | |
| 8 | Hapoel Kivshan | 14 | – | – | – | 9 | 33 | −24 | 4 (Note: Hapoel Kivshan failed to show for three fixtures and were punished with suspension of activity by the Israel Football Association.) | |

== Western Galilee Division ==
| Pos | Team | Pld | W | D | L | GF | GA | GD | Pts | Promotion |
|---|---|---|---|---|---|---|---|---|---|---|
| 1 | Beitar Nahariya | 14 | – | – | – | 40 | 3 | +37 | 28 | Promoted to Liga Bet |
| 2 | Hapoel Shlomi | 14 | – | – | – | 36 | 16 | +20 | 18 | |
| 3 | Hapoel Matzuva | 14 | – | – | – | 33 | 25 | +8 | 17 | |
| 4 | Al Ahly Majd al-Krum | 14 | – | – | – | 32 | 24 | +8 | 16 | |
| 5 | Hapoel Tarshiha | 14 | – | – | – | 23 | 35 | −12 | 12 | |
| 6 | Hapoel Hanita | 14 | – | – | – | 20 | 29 | −9 | 10 (Note: Hapoel Hanita, Hapoel Ma'alot and Isasbest Nahariya failed to show for more than three fixtures and were suspended by the Israel Football Association.) | |
| 7 | Hapoel Ma'alot | 14 | – | – | – | 15 | 34 | −19 | 8 | |
| 8 | Isasbest Nahariya | 14 | – | – | – | 4 | 37 | −33 | 3 | |

== Valleys Division ==
| Pos | Team | Pld | W | D | L | GF | GA | GD | Pts | Promotion |
|---|---|---|---|---|---|---|---|---|---|---|
| 1 | Hapoel Migdal HaEmek | 28 | – | – | – | 102 | 14 | +88 | 50 | Promoted to Liga Bet |
| 2 | Hapoel Afikim | 28 | – | – | – | 129 | 27 | +102 | 50 | Promoted to Liga Bet |
| 3 | Maccabi Afula | 28 | – | – | – | 104 | 15 | +89 | 48 | |
| 4 | Hapoel Beit She'an | 28 | – | – | – | 60 | 32 | +28 | 38 | |
| 5 | Hapoel Sde Nahum | 28 | – | – | – | 69 | 41 | +28 | 38 | |
| 6 | Hapoel Sharona\Kfar Kama | 28 | – | – | – | 56 | 69 | −13 | 28 | |
| 7 | Hapoel Neve Eitan | 28 | – | – | – | 59 | 42 | +17 | 26 | |
| 8 | Hapoel Tel Yosef | 28 | – | – | – | 50 | 54 | −4 | 24 | |
| 9 | Hapoel Beit Keshet | 28 | – | – | – | 44 | 71 | −27 | 21 | |
| 10 | Beitar Afula | 28 | – | – | – | 48 | 66 | −18 | 20 | |
| 11 | Hapoel Yardena | 28 | – | – | – | 34 | 59 | −25 | 17 | |
| 12 | Hapoel Ein Harod | 28 | – | – | – | 46 | 73 | −27 | 16 | |
| 13 | Beitar Beit She'an | 28 | – | – | – | 28 | 96 | −68 | 16 | |
| 14 | Maccabi Beit She'an | 28 | – | – | – | 27 | 92 | −65 | 15 | |
| 15 | Hapoel Kfar Baruch | 28 | – | – | – | 19 | 114 | −95 | 3 | |

== Haifa Division ==
| Pos | Team | Pld | W | D | L | GF | GA | GD | Pts | Promotion |
|---|---|---|---|---|---|---|---|---|---|---|
| 1 | Shefa-'Amr Club | 24 | 19 | 3 | 2 | 70 | 20 | +50 | 60 | Promoted to Liga Bet |
| 2 | Beitar Acre | 24 | 17 | 5 | 2 | 71 | 29 | +42 | 56 | Promoted to Liga Bet |
| 3 | Hapoel Tel Hanan | 24 | 17 | 3 | 4 | 53 | 19 | +34 | 54 | |
| 4 | Maccabi Kfar Ata | 24 | 14 | 3 | 7 | 68 | 51 | +17 | 45 | |
| 5 | Al-Amal Acre | 24 | 13 | 4 | 7 | 51 | 29 | +22 | 42 (Note: The score of two matches played by Hapoel Yokne'am, against Al-Amal and against Hapoel Ein HaMifratz was set to 0-0 with no points awarded due to infringements from both teams.) | |
| 6 | Hapoel Ein HaMifratz | 24 | 9 | 6 | 9 | 50 | 35 | +15 | 32 | |
| 7 | Beitar Kiryat Tiv'on | 24 | 8 | 5 | 11 | 32 | 44 | −12 | 29 | |
| 8 | Hapoel Kiryat Nazareth | 24 | 7 | 6 | 11 | 42 | 52 | −10 | 25 (Note: The score of two matches played by Hapoel Kiryat Nazareth, against Beitar Tel Hanan and against Hapoel Kiryat Tiv'on was set to 0-0 with no points awarded due to infringements from both teams.) | |
| 9 | Beitar Tel Hanan | 24 | 7 | 5 | 12 | 24 | 41 | −17 | 25 | |
| 10 | Hapoel Yokneam | 24 | 4 | 8 | 12 | 27 | 43 | −16 | 18 | |
| 11 | Hapoel Kiryat Tiv'on | 24 | 4 | 6 | 14 | 33 | 58 | −25 | 17 | |
| 12 | Maccabi Nesher Tel Hanan | 24 | 5 | 2 | 17 | 22 | 63 | −41 | 17 | |
| 13 | Beitar Kiryat Shprintzak | 24 | 2 | 4 | 18 | 18 | 77 | −59 | 10 | |

== Carmel Division ==
| Pos | Team | Pld | W | D | L | GF | GA | GD | Pts | Promotion |
|---|---|---|---|---|---|---|---|---|---|---|
| 1 | Hapoel Tirat HaCarmel | 20 | – | – | – | 95 | 10 | +85 | 37 | Promoted to Liga Bet |
| 2 | Hapoel Karkur | 20 | – | – | – | 56 | 23 | +33 | 32 | |
| 3 | Hapoel Beit Eliezer | 20 | – | – | – | 50 | 15 | +35 | 29 | |
| 4 | Beitar Tirat HaCarmel | 20 | – | – | – | 56 | 21 | +35 | 26 | |
| 5 | Hapoel Geva HaCarmel | 20 | – | – | – | 41 | 46 | −5 | 21 | |
| 6 | Beitar Hadera | 20 | – | – | – | 37 | 45 | −8 | 20 | |
| 7 | Hapoel Or Akiva | 20 | – | – | – | 32 | 40 | −8 | 19 | |
| 8 | Hapoel Kfar Glikson | 20 | – | – | – | 32 | 58 | −26 | 11 | |
| 9 | Beitar Atlit | 20 | – | – | – | 18 | 49 | −31 | 10 | |
| 10 | Hapoel Beit Oren | 20 | – | – | – | 13 | 54 | −41 | 5 | |
| 11 | Beitar Zikhron Ya'akov | 20 | – | – | – | 20 | 89 | −69 | 4 | |

== Samaria Division ==
| Pos | Team | Pld | W | D | L | GF | GA | GD | Pts | Promotion |
|---|---|---|---|---|---|---|---|---|---|---|
| 1 | F.C. Even Yehuda | 26 | – | – | – | 95 | 12 | +83 | 48 | Promoted to Liga Bet |
| 2 | Hapoel Pardesiya | 26 | – | – | – | 90 | 20 | +70 | 45 | Promoted to Liga Bet |
| 3 | Hapoel HaSharon HaTzfoni | 26 | – | – | – | 66 | 26 | +40 | 36 | |
| 4 | Hapoel Beit Yitzhak | 26 | – | – | – | 66 | 42 | +24 | 33 | |
| 5 | Beitar Zvi Netanya | 26 | – | – | – | 57 | 40 | +17 | 33 | |
| 6 | Hapoel Tel Mond | 26 | – | – | – | 68 | 38 | +30 | 31 | |
| 7 | Hapoel Mishmar HaSharon | 26 | – | – | – | 69 | 54 | +15 | 31 | |
| 8 | Hapoel Kfar Yona | 26 | – | – | – | 57 | 57 | 0 | 25 | |
| 9 | Maccabi Beit Lid | 26 | – | – | – | 42 | 67 | −25 | 23 | |
| 10 | Hapoel Yanuv | 26 | – | – | – | 41 | 61 | −20 | 15 | |
| 11 | Hapoel Kadima | 26 | – | – | – | 24 | 76 | −52 | 14 | |
| 12 | Hapoel Burgata | 26 | – | – | – | 27 | 79 | −52 | 13 | |
| 13 | Maccabi Amidar Netanya | 26 | – | – | – | 21 | 76 | −55 | 13 (Note: Maccabi Amidar Netanya and Hapoel Maor failed to show for more than three fixtures and were suspended by the Israel Football Association.) | |
| 14 | Hapoel Maor | 26 | – | – | – | 6 | 81 | −75 | 4 | |

== Sharon Division ==
| Pos | Team | Pld | W | D | L | GF | GA | GD | Pts | Promotion |
|---|---|---|---|---|---|---|---|---|---|---|
| 1 | Maccabi Herzliya | 22 | – | – | – | 85 | 11 | +74 | 38 (Note: Maccabi Herzliya defeated Hapoel Rosh HaAyin 1-0 in away match. The match was postponed and held at 14 September 1963. As a result, Maccabi Herzliya surpassed Hapoel Shefayim on the league table and were promoted to Liga Bet.) | Promoted to Liga Bet |
| 2 | Hapoel Shefayim | 22 | – | – | – | 72 | 15 | +57 | 38 | |
| 3 | Hapoel Ramat HaSharon | 22 | – | – | – | 95 | 18 | +77 | 36 | |
| 4 | Hapoel Ramatayim | 22 | – | – | – | 64 | 24 | +40 | 32 | |
| 5 | Hapoel Rosh HaAyin | 22 | – | – | – | 40 | 25 | +15 | 26 | |
| 6 | Hapoel Tira | 22 | – | – | – | 34 | 40 | −6 | 21 | |
| 7 | Hapoel Nof Yam | 22 | – | – | – | 32 | 39 | −7 | 18 | |
| 8 | Beitar Kfar Saba | 22 | – | – | – | 37 | 70 | −33 | 15 | |
| 9 | Beitar Ramat HaSharon | 22 | – | – | – | 29 | 69 | −40 | 14 | |
| 10 | Beitar Rosh HaAyin | 22 | – | – | – | 16 | 64 | −48 | 9 | |
| 11 | Beitar Magdiel | 22 | – | – | – | 19 | 84 | −65 | 9 | |
| 12 | Hapoel Jaljulia | 22 | – | – | – | 11 | 72 | −61 | 6 | |

== Tel Aviv Division ==
| Pos | Team | Pld | W | D | L | GF | GA | GD | Pts | Promotion |
|---|---|---|---|---|---|---|---|---|---|---|
| 1 | Beitar Ezra | 25 | – | – | – | 86 | 21 | +65 | 42 | Promoted to Liga Bet |
| 2 | Hapoel Kfar Shalem | 25 | – | – | – | 74 | 23 | +51 | 42 (Note: Hapoel Kfar Shalem were promoted to Liga Bet by the Israel Football Association, after winning a special draw, in order to make an even number of clubs in Liga Bet North B division.) | Promoted to Liga Bet |
| 3 | Hapoel Sha'ariya | 25 | – | – | – | 41 | 16 | +25 | 35 | |
| 4 | HaKochav Or Yehuda | 25 | – | – | – | 58 | 46 | +12 | 31 | |
| 5 | Beitar Bat Yam | 25 | – | – | – | 52 | 25 | +27 | 29 | |
| 6 | Hapoel Ezra | 25 | – | – | – | 50 | 36 | +14 | 27 | |
| 7 | Kedma Club | 25 | – | – | – | 35 | 38 | −3 | 23 | |
| 8 | Beitar Petah Tikva | 25 | – | – | – | 43 | 58 | −15 | 23 | |
| 9 | Beitar Ganei Tikva | 25 | – | – | – | 48 | 67 | −19 | 23 | |
| 10 | Maccabi Ramat Hen | 25 | – | – | – | 56 | 49 | +7 | 22 | |
| 11 | Beitar Ramat Gan | 25 | – | – | – | 42 | 45 | −3 | 21 | |
| 12 | Maccabi Ein Ganim | 25 | – | – | – | 17 | 62 | −45 | 8 (Note: Maccabi Ein Ganim failed to show in most of the second round and were suspended by the Israel Football Association.) | |
| 13 | Beitar Jaffa | 13 | – | – | – | 16 | 34 | −18 | 4 (Note: Beitar Jaffa entered the league in the second round.) | |
| 14 | Beitar Or Yehuda | 25 | – | – | – | 19 | 117 | −98 | 4 | |

== Central Division ==
| Pos | Team | Pld | W | D | L | GF | GA | GD | Pts | Promotion |
|---|---|---|---|---|---|---|---|---|---|---|
| 1 | Hapoel Bnei Zion | 22 | – | – | – | 69 | 30 | +39 | 40 | Promoted to Liga Bet |
| 2 | Hapoel Shikun HaMizrah | 22 | – | – | – | 70 | 19 | +51 | 35 | Promoted to Liga Bet |
| 3 | Beitar Rehovot | 22 | – | – | – | 49 | 32 | +17 | 30 | |
| 4 | Hapoel Zarnuga | 22 | – | – | – | 60 | 31 | +29 | 27 | |
| 5 | Beitar Rishon LeZion | 22 | – | – | – | 46 | 27 | +19 | 27 | |
| 6 | Beitar Mahane Israel | 22 | – | – | – | 32 | 41 | −9 | 21 | |
| 7 | Maccabi Kfar Gvirol | 22 | – | – | – | 44 | 39 | +5 | 20 | |
| 8 | Hapoel Givat Brenner | 22 | – | – | – | 37 | 43 | −6 | 19 | |
| 9 | Beitar Yehud | 22 | – | – | – | 25 | 43 | −18 | 15 | |
| 10 | Hapoel Beit Dagan | 22 | – | – | – | 21 | 58 | −37 | 11 | |
| 11 | Hapoel Zeitan | 22 | – | – | – | 24 | 55 | −31 | 10 (Note: Hapoel Zeitan failed to show for away fixtures in the second round and were suspended by the Israel Football Association.) | |
| 12 | Beitar Beit Dagan | 22 | – | – | – | 11 | 78 | −67 | 6 | |

Notes:

Hapoel Shmuel Ramla were suspended from the league at the beginning of the season.

== Jerusalem Division ==
| Pos | Team | Pld | W | D | L | GF | GA | GD | Pts | Promotion |
|---|---|---|---|---|---|---|---|---|---|---|
| 1 | Hapoel HaTzafon Jerusalem | 12 | – | – | – | 36 | 6 | +30 | 21 | Promoted to Liga Bet |
| 2 | Hapoel Beit Shemesh | 12 | – | – | – | 29 | 6 | +23 | 17 | |
| 3 | Hapoel HaDarom Jerusalem | 12 | – | – | – | 19 | 25 | −6 | 12 | |
| 4 | Hapoel Ein Karem | 12 | – | – | – | 18 | 16 | +2 | 11 | |
| 5 | Maccabi Jerusalem | 12 | – | – | – | 21 | 27 | −6 | 10 | |
| 6 | Beitar Beit Shemesh | 12 | – | – | – | 16 | 24 | −8 | 9 | |
| 7 | Beitar Ein Karem | 12 | – | – | – | 8 | 43 | −35 | 2 | |

Beitar Amatzia folded at the beginning of the season.

== South A Division ==
| Pos | Team | Pld | W | D | L | GF | GA | GD | Pts | Promotion |
|---|---|---|---|---|---|---|---|---|---|---|
| 1 | Beitar Ekron | 16 | – | – | – | 49 | 11 | +38 | 30 | Promoted to Liga Bet |
| 2 | Hapoel Gedera | 16 | – | – | – | 33 | 15 | +18 | 23 | |
| 3 | Hapoel Kiryat Malakhi | 16 | – | – | – | 39 | 12 | +27 | 22 | |
| 4 | Maccabi Kiryat Malakhi | 16 | – | – | – | 30 | 23 | +7 | 17 | |
| 5 | Hapoel Hatzav | 16 | – | – | – | 26 | 23 | +3 | 15 | |
| 6 | Beitar Gedera | 16 | – | – | – | 28 | 38 | −10 | 13 | |
| 7 | Hapoel Yinon | 16 | – | – | – | 25 | 41 | −16 | 8 | |
| 8 | Hapoel Azrikam | 16 | – | – | – | 14 | 39 | −25 | 6 (Note: Hapoel Azrikam failed to show in the second round fixtures and were punished with suspension of activity by the Israel Football Association.) | |
| 9 | Maccabi Ekron | 16 | – | – | – | 14 | 56 | −42 | 2 | |

== South B Division ==
| Pos | Team | Pld | W | D | L | GF | GA | GD | Pts | Promotion |
|---|---|---|---|---|---|---|---|---|---|---|
| 1 | Maccabi Ashkelon | 20 | – | – | – | 52 | 26 | +26 | 33 | Promoted to Liga Bet |
| 2 | Hapoel Gat | 20 | – | – | – | 68 | 22 | +46 | 32 | |
| 3 | Beitar Ashkelon | 20 | – | – | – | 44 | 31 | +13 | 27 | |
| 4 | Hapoel Ashdod | 20 | – | – | – | 68 | 34 | +34 | 26 | |
| 5 | Maccabi Kiryat Gat | 20 | – | – | – | 27 | 30 | −3 | 18 | |
| 6 | Hapoel Nehora | 20 | – | – | – | 32 | 43 | −11 | 17 | |
| 7 | Hapoel Shtulim | 20 | – | – | – | 25 | 47 | −22 | 15 | |
| 8 | Hapoel Sde Uziyahu | 20 | – | – | – | 38 | 40 | −2 | 14 | |
| 9 | Hapoel Beit Ezra | 20 | – | – | – | 35 | 52 | −17 | 14 | |
| 10 | Maccabi Ashdod | 20 | – | – | – | 22 | 36 | −14 | 13 | |
| 11 | Beitar Ashdod | 20 | – | – | – | 20 | 70 | −50 | 7 | |

== Negev A Division ==
| Pos | Team | Pld | W | D | L | GF | GA | GD | Pts | Promotion |
|---|---|---|---|---|---|---|---|---|---|---|
| 1 | Hapoel Avraham Be'er Sheva | 14 | – | – | – | 60 | 11 | +49 | 26 | Promoted to Liga Bet |
| 2 | Hapoel Dimona | 14 | – | – | – | 40 | 17 | +23 | 21 | |
| 3 | Beitar Dimona | 14 | – | – | – | 28 | 18 | +10 | 18 | |
| 4 | Maccabi Be'er Sheva | 14 | – | – | – | 25 | 27 | −2 | 11 | |
| 5 | Hapoel Kfar Yeruham | 14 | – | – | – | 25 | 23 | +2 | 9 | |
| 6 | Hapoel Mashabei Sadeh | 14 | – | – | – | 21 | 51 | −30 | 8 | |
| 7 | Beitar Ofakim | 14 | – | – | – | 17 | 45 | −28 | 7 | |
| 8 | Hapoel Mitzpe Ramon | 14 | – | – | – | 9 | 33 | −24 | 6 | |

== Negev B Division ==
| Pos | Team | Pld | W | D | L | GF | GA | GD | Pts | Promotion |
|---|---|---|---|---|---|---|---|---|---|---|
| 1 | Hapoel Dorot | 20 | – | – | – | 87 | 22 | +65 | 36 | Promoted to Liga Bet |
| 2 | Hapoel Be'eri | 20 | – | – | – | 72 | 23 | +49 | 32 | |
| 3 | Hapoel Shelahim | 20 | – | – | – | 46 | 36 | +10 | 24 | |
| 4 | Hapoel Erez | 20 | – | – | – | 51 | 38 | +13 | 21 | |
| 5 | Hapoel Or HaNer | 20 | – | – | – | 47 | 48 | −1 | 21 | |
| 6 | Hapoel Bror Hayil | 20 | – | – | – | 46 | 53 | −7 | 20 | |
| 7 | Hapoel Nir Yitzhak | 20 | – | – | – | 37 | 52 | −15 | 19 | |
| 8 | Hapoel Gevim | 20 | – | – | – | 31 | 40 | −9 | 17 | |
| 9 | Hapoel Mefalsim | 20 | – | – | – | 33 | 50 | −17 | 14 | |
| 10 | Hapoel Netivot | 20 | – | – | – | 22 | 65 | −43 | 8 | |
| 11 | Hapoel Sha'ariyot | 20 | – | – | – | 20 | 65 | −45 | 6 | |

Hapoel Patish\Maslul, Hapoel Ein HaShlosha and Hapoel Yakhini were all folded during the first round.

== See also ==
- 1962–63 Liga Leumit
- 1962–63 Liga Alef
- 1962–63 Liga Bet
