= 1976–77 Liga Gimel =

Israeli football season

The 1976–77 Liga Gimel season saw 112 clubs competing in 8 regional divisions for promotion to Liga Bet.

Maccabi Sektzia Ma'alot-Tarshiha, Hapoel Sakhnin, Hapoel Kfar Ruppin Gilboa, Hapoel Givat Haim, Hapoel Ganei Tikva, A.S. Lazarus Holon, Beitar Katamonim and Hapoel Yeruham won their regional divisions and promoted to Liga Bet.

== Galilee Division ==
| Pos | Team | Pld | W | D | L | GF | GA | GD | Pts | Promotion or relegation |
|---|---|---|---|---|---|---|---|---|---|---|
| 1 | Maccabi Sektzia Ma'alot-Tarshiha | 24 | 19 | 4 | 1 | 52 | 19 | +33 | 42 | Promoted to Liga Bet |
| 2 | Hapoel Yardena | 24 | 14 | 3 | 7 | 53 | 30 | +23 | 31 | |
| 3 | Maccabi Beit She'an | 24 | 13 | 4 | 7 | 55 | 43 | +12 | 30 | |
| 4 | Maccabi Safed | 24 | 12 | 4 | 8 | 52 | 32 | +20 | 28 | |
| 5 | Hapoel Ein Harod Kinneret | 24 | 10 | 8 | 6 | 55 | 40 | +15 | 28 | |
| 6 | Hapoel Karmiel | 24 | 11 | 3 | 10 | 66 | 56 | +10 | 25 | |
| 7 | Maccabi Karmiel | 24 | 12 | 1 | 11 | 55 | 57 | −2 | 25 | |
| 8 | Hapoel Kafr Sumei | 24 | 10 | 4 | 10 | 46 | 61 | −15 | 24 | |
| 9 | Hapoel Tur'an | 24 | 6 | 8 | 10 | 38 | 47 | −9 | 20 | |
| 10 | Hapoel Yir'on | 24 | 8 | 3 | 13 | 53 | 61 | −8 | 19 | |
| 11 | Hapoel Shlomi | 24 | 7 | 5 | 12 | 41 | 59 | −18 | 19 | |
| 12 | Hapoel Kfar HaNasi | 24 | 4 | 4 | 16 | 26 | 58 | −32 | 12 | Demoted to Liga Dalet |
| 13 | Beitar Hatzor | 24 | 3 | 3 | 18 | 20 | 49 | −29 | 9 | Reprieved from relegation |
| – | Hapoel Ne'ot Mordechai | 0 | 0 | 0 | 0 | 0 | 0 | 0 | 0 | |

== Bay Division ==
| Pos | Team | Pld | W | D | L | GF | GA | GD | Pts | Promotion or relegation |
|---|---|---|---|---|---|---|---|---|---|---|
| 1 | Hapoel Sakhnin | 26 | 16 | 7 | 3 | 60 | 28 | +32 | 39 | Promoted to Liga Bet |
| 2 | Hapoel Shefa-'Amr | 26 | 17 | 6 | 3 | 86 | 31 | +55 | 38 (Note: 2 points deducted) | |
| 3 | Maccabi Sakhnin | 26 | 16 | 6 | 4 | 65 | 35 | +30 | 36 | |
| 4 | Maccabi Acre | 26 | 16 | 7 | 3 | 85 | 30 | +55 | 35 (Note: 4 points deducted) | |
| 5 | Maccabi Tzur Shalom | 26 | 14 | 4 | 8 | 48 | 43 | +5 | 32 | |
| 6 | Maccabi Ben Ami | 26 | 11 | 6 | 9 | 57 | 61 | −4 | 28 | |
| 7 | Hapoel Abu Snan | 26 | 11 | 5 | 10 | 50 | 45 | +5 | 25 | |
| 8 | Hapoel Makr | 26 | 9 | 5 | 12 | 54 | 42 | +12 | 23 | |
| 9 | Maccabi Shefa-'Amr | 26 | 7 | 7 | 12 | 39 | 53 | −14 | 21 | |
| 10 | Hapoel Kiryat Tiv'on | 26 | 6 | 7 | 13 | 43 | 65 | −22 | 17 | |
| 11 | Hapoel Rechasim | 26 | 6 | 6 | 14 | 44 | 73 | −29 | 16 | |
| 12 | Maccabi Tel Hanan | 26 | 9 | 0 | 17 | 43 | 92 | −49 | 16 | |
| 13 | Hapoel Sha'ab | 26 | 7 | 3 | 16 | 33 | 68 | −35 | 13 | |
| 14 | Beitar Haifa | 26 | 1 | 1 | 24 | 17 | 58 | −41 | 1 | Relegated to Liga Dalet |

== Haifa Division ==
| Pos | Team | Pld | W | D | L | GF | GA | GD | Pts | Promotion or relegation |
|---|---|---|---|---|---|---|---|---|---|---|
| 1 | Hapoel Kfar Ruppin Gilboa | 26 | 18 | 7 | 1 | 65 | 22 | +43 | 43 | Promoted to Liga Bet |
| 2 | Hapoel Daliyat al-Karmel | 26 | 17 | 5 | 4 | 57 | 14 | +43 | 39 | |
| 3 | Hapoel HaTzair Daliyat al-Karmel | 26 | 17 | 4 | 5 | 49 | 22 | +27 | 38 | |
| 4 | Hapoel Ahva Haifa | 26 | 13 | 8 | 5 | 41 | 23 | +18 | 32 (Note: 2 points deducted) | |
| 5 | Beitar al-Amal Nazareth | 26 | 15 | 5 | 6 | 53 | 36 | +17 | 31 (Note: 4 points deducted) | |
| 6 | Hapoel Ein Mahil | 26 | 12 | 6 | 8 | 50 | 38 | +12 | 30 | |
| 7 | Hapoel Yokne'am | 26 | 10 | 6 | 10 | 36 | 49 | −13 | 26 | |
| 8 | Beitar Daliyat al-Karmel | 26 | 8 | 7 | 11 | 32 | 41 | −9 | 23 | |
| 9 | Hapoel Arrabe | 26 | 7 | 10 | 9 | 40 | 45 | −5 | 22 | |
| 10 | Maccabi Kafr Kanna | 26 | 8 | 3 | 15 | 30 | 44 | −14 | 19 | |
| 11 | Maccabi Afula | 26 | 10 | 3 | 13 | 37 | 46 | −9 | 13 (Note: 10 points deducted?) | |
| 12 | Hapoel Ta'anachim | 26 | 7 | 1 | 18 | 41 | 71 | −30 | 13 | |
| 13 | Hapoel Isfiya | 26 | 3 | 6 | 17 | 21 | 49 | −28 | 12 | |
| 14 | Hapoel Bnei Nein | 26 | 1 | 1 | 24 | 11 | 63 | −52 | 3 | Relegated to Liga Dalet |

== Samaria Division ==
| Pos | Team | Pld | W | D | L | GF | GA | GD | Pts | Promotion or relegation |
|---|---|---|---|---|---|---|---|---|---|---|
| 1 | Hapoel Givat Haim | 26 | 22 | 2 | 2 | 95 | 24 | +71 | 46 | Promoted to Liga Bet |
| 2 | Hapoel Atlit | 26 | 19 | 5 | 2 | 81 | 36 | +45 | 43 | |
| 3 | Beitar Binyamina | 26 | 14 | 8 | 4 | 64 | 39 | +25 | 36 | |
| 4 | Maccabi Amidar Netanya | 26 | 14 | 4 | 8 | 48 | 38 | +10 | 32 | |
| 5 | Maccabi Fureidis | 26 | 11 | 5 | 10 | 46 | 50 | −4 | 27 | |
| 6 | Maccabi Or Akiva | 26 | 9 | 7 | 10 | 50 | 38 | +12 | 25 | |
| 7 | Hapoel Halissa | 26 | 12 | 1 | 13 | 60 | 77 | −17 | 25 | |
| 8 | Beitar Pardes Hanna | 26 | 9 | 6 | 11 | 35 | 40 | −5 | 24 | |
| 9 | Hapoel Baqa al-Gharbiyye | 26 | 7 | 8 | 11 | 39 | 46 | −7 | 22 | |
| 10 | Bnei Umm al-Fahm | 26 | 8 | 3 | 15 | 41 | 54 | −13 | 19 | |
| 11 | Maccabi Umm al-Fahm | 26 | 7 | 5 | 14 | 36 | 67 | −31 | 19 | |
| 12 | Maccabi Tzofei Haifa | 26 | 5 | 6 | 15 | 21 | 45 | −24 | 16 | |
| 13 | Hapoel Sela Hadera | 26 | 5 | 6 | 15 | 31 | 62 | −31 | 16 | |
| 14 | Maccabi Pardes Hanna | 26 | 6 | 2 | 18 | 24 | 58 | −34 | 14 | Relegated to Liga Dalet |

== Sharon Division ==
| Pos | Team | Pld | W | D | L | GF | GA | GD | Pts | Promotion or relegation |
|---|---|---|---|---|---|---|---|---|---|---|
| 1 | Hapoel Ganei Tikva | 26 | 22 | 4 | 0 | 70 | 15 | +55 | 48 | Promoted to Liga Bet |
| 2 | Hapoel Jaljulia | 26 | 19 | 4 | 3 | 62 | 22 | +40 | 42 | |
| 3 | Elitzur Bar Ilan | 26 | 13 | 5 | 8 | 46 | 35 | +11 | 31 | |
| 4 | Beitar Kfar Saba | 26 | 12 | 6 | 8 | 38 | 30 | +8 | 30 | |
| 5 | Hapoel Hod HaSharon | 26 | 11 | 6 | 9 | 55 | 40 | +15 | 28 | |
| 6 | Hapoel Tel Mond | 26 | 10 | 8 | 8 | 59 | 51 | +8 | 28 | |
| 7 | Hapoel Tira | 26 | 11 | 7 | 8 | 55 | 42 | +13 | 27 (Note: 2 points deducted) | |
| 8 | Maccabi Ramat HaSharon | 26 | 11 | 5 | 10 | 45 | 46 | −1 | 27 | |
| 9 | Hapoel Tnuvot | 26 | 10 | 3 | 13 | 48 | 50 | −2 | 23 | |
| 10 | Hapoel Ge'ulim | 26 | 8 | 6 | 12 | 44 | 51 | −7 | 22 | |
| 11 | Hapoel Sdei Hemed | 26 | 6 | 6 | 14 | 33 | 51 | −18 | 18 | |
| 12 | Hapoel Kadima | 26 | 8 | 4 | 14 | 43 | 59 | −16 | 16 (Note: 4 points deducted) | |
| 13 | M.S. Even Yehuda | 26 | 5 | 2 | 19 | 21 | 53 | −32 | 12 | |
| 14 | Maccabi Kfar Yona | 26 | 1 | 4 | 21 | 28 | 102 | −74 | 6 | Relegated to Liga Dalet |

== Dan Division ==
| Pos | Team | Pld | W | D | L | GF | GA | GD | Pts | Promotion or relegation |
|---|---|---|---|---|---|---|---|---|---|---|
| 1 | Lazarus Holon | 26 | 18 | 6 | 2 | 75 | 26 | +49 | 42 | Promoted to Liga Bet |
| 2 | Maccabi Bat Yam | 26 | 15 | 7 | 4 | 57 | 21 | +36 | 37 | |
| 3 | Hapoel Kiryat Shalom | 26 | 14 | 8 | 4 | 57 | 36 | +21 | 36 | |
| 4 | Hapoel Azor | 26 | 16 | 2 | 8 | 59 | 32 | +27 | 34 | |
| 5 | Maccabi Rishon LeZion | 26 | 12 | 6 | 8 | 49 | 52 | −3 | 30 | |
| 6 | Hapoel Ihud Tzeirei Jaffa | 26 | 12 | 5 | 9 | 51 | 46 | +5 | 29 | |
| 7 | Beitar Lod | 26 | 13 | 5 | 8 | 61 | 47 | +14 | 25 (Note: 6 points deducted) | |
| 8 | Hapoel Neve Golan | 26 | 10 | 3 | 13 | 43 | 50 | −7 | 23 | |
| 9 | Maccabi Ben Zvi | 26 | 8 | 5 | 13 | 35 | 53 | −18 | 21 | |
| 10 | Hapoel Bnei Zion | 26 | 6 | 8 | 12 | 36 | 50 | −14 | 20 | |
| 11 | Hapoel Tzafon Tel Aviv | 26 | 8 | 3 | 15 | 45 | 63 | −18 | 19 | |
| 12 | Maccabi Holon | 26 | 7 | 4 | 15 | 41 | 51 | −10 | 18 | |
| 13 | Hapoel Bnei Lod | 26 | 6 | 1 | 19 | 42 | 84 | −42 | 13 | |
| 14 | Hapoel Afeka | 26 | 4 | 3 | 19 | 22 | 62 | −40 | 11 | Relegated to Liga Dalet |

== Central Division ==
| Pos | Team | Pld | W | D | L | GF | GA | GD | Pts | Promotion |
|---|---|---|---|---|---|---|---|---|---|---|
| 1 | Beitar Katamonim | 24 | 17 | 5 | 2 | 58 | 19 | +39 | 35 (Note: 4 points deducted) | Promoted to Liga Bet |
| 2 | Maccabi Kiryat Ekron | 24 | 12 | 11 | 1 | 59 | 23 | +36 | 35 | |
| 3 | Maccabi Lod | 24 | 14 | 6 | 4 | 69 | 38 | +31 | 34 | |
| 4 | A.S. Moshe Rehovot | 24 | 13 | 7 | 4 | 49 | 20 | +29 | 33 | |
| 5 | Hapoel Sde Uziyah | 24 | 13 | 6 | 5 | 51 | 22 | +29 | 32 | |
| 6 | ASA Jerusalem | 24 | 13 | 4 | 7 | 71 | 41 | +30 | 30 | |
| 7 | Hapoel Mevaseret Zion | 24 | 7 | 9 | 8 | 46 | 53 | −7 | 23 | |
| 8 | Hapoel Azrikam | 24 | 8 | 5 | 11 | 38 | 43 | −5 | 21 | |
| 9 | Maccabi Jerusalem | 24 | 6 | 6 | 12 | 30 | 63 | −33 | 18 | |
| 10 | Hapoel HaShalom Ramla | 24 | 6 | 4 | 14 | 31 | 48 | −17 | 16 | |
| 11 | Maccabi Beit Shemesh | 24 | 6 | 4 | 14 | 35 | 78 | −43 | 16 | |
| 12 | Hapoel Yehuda | 24 | 5 | 2 | 17 | 38 | 87 | −49 | 12 | |
| 13 | Hapoel Matzliah | 24 | 0 | 3 | 21 | 6 | 46 | −40 | −1 | |
| – | Hapoel Zichronot | 0 | 0 | 0 | 0 | 0 | 0 | 0 | 0 | |

== South Division ==
| Pos | Team | Pld | W | D | L | GF | GA | GD | Pts | Promotion or relegation |
|---|---|---|---|---|---|---|---|---|---|---|
| 1 | Hapoel Yeruham | 26 | 22 | 2 | 2 | 79 | 17 | +62 | 46 | Promoted to Liga Bet |
| 2 | Maccabi Be'er Sheva | 26 | 21 | 1 | 4 | 73 | 18 | +55 | 43 | |
| 3 | Hapoel Bnei Lakhish | 26 | 16 | 3 | 7 | 62 | 39 | +23 | 35 | |
| 4 | Maccabi Dimona | 26 | 14 | 5 | 7 | 50 | 30 | +20 | 33 | |
| 5 | Hapoel Be'eri | 26 | 13 | 6 | 7 | 70 | 46 | +24 | 32 | |
| 6 | Hapoel Sderot | 26 | 13 | 4 | 9 | 63 | 47 | +16 | 30 | |
| 7 | Maccabi Eilat | 26 | 11 | 4 | 11 | 46 | 52 | −6 | 26 | |
| 8 | Maccabi Kiryat Malakhi | 26 | 11 | 3 | 12 | 50 | 32 | +18 | 25 | |
| 9 | Hapoel Patish | 26 | 10 | 5 | 11 | 39 | 42 | −3 | 25 | |
| 10 | Hapoel Hatzav | 26 | 7 | 5 | 14 | 30 | 57 | −27 | 19 | |
| 11 | Beitar Kiryat Gat | 26 | 7 | 3 | 16 | 38 | 68 | −30 | 17 | |
| 12 | Hapoel Netivot | 26 | 6 | 4 | 16 | 34 | 72 | −38 | 16 | |
| 13 | Beitar Ofakim | 26 | 6 | 0 | 20 | 39 | 93 | −54 | 12 | |
| 14 | Hapoel Arad | 26 | 2 | 1 | 23 | 10 | 70 | −60 | 3 (Note: 2 points deducted) | Relegated to Liga Dalet |
