= Maccabi Pardes Katz F.C. =

Israeli football club

Maccabi Pardes Katz
- Full name: Maccabi Pardes Katz F.C. מכבי פרדס כץ
- Founded: 2012
- Manager: Shalom Lavi
- League: Liga Gimel
- 2023–24: Liga Gimel Tel Aviv, 16th

Maccabi Pardes Katz, (Hebrew: בית"ר פרדס כץ), is an Israeli football club based in Pardes Katz neighborhood of Bnei Brak.

== History ==
The club was founded in 2012 as an initiative by local person, Roni Itzhak, to revive senior football in Pardes Katz following the closure of Beitar Pardes Katz in 2007. The club joined Liga Gimel Tel Aviv division, where they played ever since.

== Seasons ==
Season	League									State Cup	Top goalscorer		Coach
Season	Division	P	W	D	L	F	A	Pts	Pos	State Cup	Name	Goals	Coach
2012–13	Gimel; Tel Aviv div.	30	6	4	20	60	128	22	13th	dnp	Eyal Zada	20	Shalom Lavi
2013–14	Gimel; Tel Aviv div.	30	3	2	25	49	155	11	15th	dnp	Adi Shamai	9	Shalom Lavi
2014–15	Gimel; Tel Aviv div.	28	2	2	24	53	154	8	14th	dnp	Nisim Sabag	21	Shalom Lavi
2015–16	Gimel; Tel Aviv div.	26	7	0	19	36	126	16	12th	dnp	Nisim Sabag	8	Shalom Lavi
Total		114	18	8	88	198	563				Nisim Sabag	31	
