= 1965–66 Liga Gimel =

Israeli football season

The 1965–66 Liga Gimel season saw 175 clubs competing in 14 regional divisions for promotion to Liga Bet.

Hapoel Hatzor, Beitar Acre, Hapoel Beit She'an, Hapoel Shefa-'Amr, Hapoel Atlit, Hapoel Zikhron Ya'akov, Hapoel Kfar Yona, Hapoel Rosh HaAyin, David Tel Aviv, Maccabi Ramla, Beitar Beit Dagan, Maccabi Kiryat Gat, Beitar Ashdod and Hapoel Yeruham won their regional divisions and qualified for the Promotion play-offs.

At the Promotion play-offs, Hapoel Beit She'an, Beitar Acre, Hapoel Atlit and Hapoel Zikhron Ya'akov were promoted to Liga Bet from the North play-offs, whilst Maccabi Ramla, Beitar Beit Dagan, Hapoel Rosh HaAyin and David Tel Aviv were promoted to Liga Bet from the South play-offs.

15 clubs did not finish the season due to suspensions and withdrawals.

== Upper Galilee Division ==
Pos	Team	Pld	W	D	L	GF	GA	GD	Pts	Qualification
1	Hapoel Hatzor	20	–	–	–	70	12	+58	37	Promotion play-offs
2	Beitar Tiberias	20	–	–	–	62	27	+35	30	
3	Hapoel Dan	20	–	–	–	54	29	+25	29	
4	Beitar Safed	20	–	–	–	60	26	+34	27	
5	Hapoel Ayelet HaShahar	20	–	–	–	64	31	+33	23	
6	Hapoel Yir'on	20	–	–	–	46	51	−5	21	
7	Hapoel Neot Mordechai	20	–	–	–	45	41	+4	20	
8	Maccabi Rosh Pinna	20	–	–	–	37	51	−14	14	
9	Hapoel Bnei HaGalil	20	–	–	–	18	54	−36	10	
10	Hapoel Dishon	20	–	–	–	28	83	−55	9	
11	Beitar Yosef Kiryat Shmona	20	–	–	–	3	82	−79	0	

== Western Galilee Division ==
Pos	Team	Pld	W	D	L	GF	GA	GD	Pts	Qualification
1	Beitar Acre	26	–	–	–	93	9	+84	50	Promotion play-offs
2	Al-Amal Acre	26	–	–	–	99	11	+88	49	
3	Hapoel Kafr Yasif	26	–	–	–	61	34	+27	34	
4	Al Ahly Majd al-Krum	26	–	–	–	42	35	+7	28	
5	Shimshon Nahariya	26	–	–	–	65	41	+24	27	
6	Hapoel Shlomi	26	–	–	–	69	60	+9	26	
7	Bnei Tamra	26	–	–	–	39	34	+5	26	
8	Maccabi Nahariya	26	–	–	–	47	44	+3	25	
9	Hapoel Tamra	26	–	–	–	39	68	−29	23	
10	Maccabi Tamra	26	–	–	–	39	75	−36	21	
11	Hapoel Mi'ilya	26	–	–	–	32	64	−32	20	
12	Hapoel Sakhnin	26	–	–	–	31	60	−29	15	
13	Hapoel I'billin	26	–	–	–	20	74	−54	11	
14	Hapoel Tarshiha	26	–	–	–	10	77	−67	3	

== Valleys Division ==
Pos	Team	Pld	W	D	L	GF	GA	GD	Pts	Qualification
1	Hapoel Beit She'an	18	–	–	–	88	20	+68	33	Promotion play-offs
2	Hapoel Beit HaShita	18	–	–	–	86	16	+70	30	
3	Maccabi Afula	18	–	–	–	53	22	+31	28	
4	Beitar Beit She'an	18	–	–	–	40	31	+9	20	
5	Hapoel Tel Yosef	18	–	–	–	56	34	+22	19	
6	Hapoel Kafr Sulam	18	–	–	–	35	41	−6	16	
7	Hapoel Geva	18	–	–	–	41	57	−16	11	
8	Hapoel Hever	18	–	–	–	23	60	−37	9	
9	Hapoel Vatikei Balfouria	18	–	–	–	18	81	−63	9	
10	Maccabi Beit She'an	18	–	–	–	12	68	−56	4	

== Nazareth Division ==
Pos	Team	Pld	W	D	L	GF	GA	GD	Pts	Qualification
1	Hapoel Shefa-'Amr	22	–	–	–	88	11	+77	39	Promotion play-offs
2	Hapoel Kiryat Tiv'on	22	–	–	–	72	17	+55	38	
3	Hapoel Kiryat Nazareth	22	–	–	–	55	23	+32	33	
4	Beitar Migdal HaEmek	22	–	–	–	51	23	+28	30	
5	Al Ahly Nazareth	22	–	–	–	47	29	+18	25	
6	HaPiryon Shefa-'Amr	22	–	–	–	33	37	−4	22	
7	Tzeirei HaDruzim	22	–	–	–	36	39	−3	20	
8	Hapoel Reineh	22	–	–	–	34	53	−19	17	
9	Hapoel Rekhasim	22	–	–	–	29	49	−20	14	
10	Al-Amal HaKatoli	22	–	–	–	27	64	−37	13	
11	Al-Salam Nazareth	22	–	–	–	22	63	−41	9	
12	Hapoel Daburiyya	22	–	–	–	8	91	−83	1	

== Haifa Division ==
Pos	Team	Pld	W	D	L	GF	GA	GD	Pts	Qualification
1	Hapoel Atlit	24	–	–	–	99	17	+82	46	Promotion play-offs
2	Beitar Kiryat Binyamin	24	–	–	–	63	24	+39	37	
3	Maccabi Neve Sha'anan	24	–	–	–	63	56	+7	28	
4	Hapoel Ahva Haifa	24	–	–	–	49	50	−1	27	
5	Hapoel Geva HaCarmel	24	–	–	–	59	43	+16	25	
6	Beitar Tel Hanan	24	–	–	–	35	34	+1	23	
7	Hapoel HaTzair Haifa	24	–	–	–	34	33	+1	21	
8	Maccabi Tel Hanan	24	–	–	–	38	44	−6	21	
9	Hapoel Kiryat Yam	24	–	–	–	44	58	−14	20	
10	Hapoel Ein HaMifratz	24	–	–	–	39	49	−10	19	
11	Hapoel Kiryat Binyamin	24	–	–	–	37	65	−28	17	
12	Hapoel Tzrufa	24	–	–	–	35	79	−44	11	
13	Hapoel Yokneam	24	–	–	–	25	68	−43	9	

== Samaria Division ==
Pos	Team	Pld	W	D	L	GF	GA	GD	Pts	Qualification
1	Hapoel Zikhron Ya'akov	28	–	–	–	109	29	+80	48	Promotion play-offs
2	Hapoel Beit Yitzhak	28	–	–	–	97	37	+60	42	
3	Beitar Zvi Netanya	28	–	–	–	85	31	+54	42	
4	Maccabi Amidar Netanya	28	–	–	–	90	41	+49	41	
5	Maccabi Fureidis	28	–	–	–	85	43	+42	35	
6	Beitar Binyamina	28	–	–	–	66	33	+33	34	
7	Beitar Hadera	28	–	–	–	80	46	+34	34	
8	Hapoel Or Akiva	28	–	–	–	63	38	+25	29	
9	Maccabi HaSharon Netanya	28	–	–	–	43	19	+24	29	
10	Maccabi Kafr Qasim	28	–	–	–	40	97	−57	18	
11	Hapoel Lehavot Haviva	28	–	–	–	37	74	−37	16	
12	Beitar Or Akiva	28	–	–	–	82	97	−15	14	
13	Hapoel Kafr Qara	28	–	–	–	34	75	−41	13	
14	Beitar Zikhron Ya'akov	28	–	–	–	23	112	−89	6	
15	Hapoel 'Ara	28	–	–	–	9	91	−82	6	

== Sharon Division ==
Pos	Team	Pld	W	D	L	GF	GA	GD	Pts	Qualification
1	Hapoel Kfar Yona	24	–	–	–	73	22	+51	43	Promotion play-offs
2	Hapoel Ein HaTchelet	24	–	–	–	76	21	+55	39	
3	Hapoel Tel Mond	24	–	–	–	93	36	+57	32	
4	Hapoel Yanuv	24	–	–	–	52	36	+16	30	
5	Hapoel Burgata	24	–	–	–	46	30	+16	29	
6	Hapoel Tira	24	–	–	–	68	31	+37	28	
7	Hapoel Tayibe	24	–	–	–	45	46	−1	26	
8	Hapoel Elyakhin	24	–	–	–	49	44	+5	24	
9	Hapoel Qalansawe	24	–	–	–	30	43	−13	23	
10	Maccabi Bnei Tira	24	–	–	–	37	73	−36	14	
11	Hapoel Tnuvot	24	–	–	–	22	64	−42	12	
12	Maccabi Kfar Yona	24	–	–	–	27	76	−49	8	
13	Maccabi Tayibe	24	–	–	–	5	101	−96	1	

== Petah Tikva Division ==
Pos	Team	Pld	W	D	L	GF	GA	GD	Pts	Qualification
1	Hapoel Rosh HaAyin	26	–	–	–	117	15	+102	50	Promotion play-offs
2	F.C. Ein Ya'akov	26	–	–	–	86	22	+64	46	
3	Hapoel Kafr Qasim	26	–	–	–	90	28	+62	35	
4	Shimshon Rosh HaAyin	26	–	–	–	70	44	+26	34	
5	Beitar Magdiel	26	–	–	–	91	60	+31	29	
6	Hapoel Peretz Ra'anana	26	–	–	–	56	51	+5	28	
7	Hapoel Jaljulia	26	–	–	–	51	43	+8	27	
8	Hapoel Hod HaSharon	26	–	–	–	57	89	−32	26	
9	Beitar Mahane Yehuda	26	–	–	–	36	66	−30	18	
10	Hapoel Eliyahu Ra'anana	26	–	–	–	46	73	−27	16	
11	Beitar Rosh HaAyin	26	–	–	–	38	79	−41	13	
12	Beitar Fajja Petah Tikva	26	–	–	–	36	82	−46	10	
13	Beitar Amishav Petah Tikva	26	–	–	–	35	76	−41	9	
14	Maccabi Rosh HaAyin	26	–	–	–	38	119	−81	5	

== Tel Aviv Division ==
Pos	Team	Pld	W	D	L	GF	GA	GD	Pts	Qualification
1	David Tel Aviv	24	–	–	–	80	13	+67	46	Promotion play-offs
2	Hapoel Ramat HaSharon	24	–	–	–	83	21	+62	40	
3	Beitar Herzliya	24	–	–	–	69	32	+37	35	
4	Hapoel Kiryat Shalom	24	–	–	–	80	39	+41	31	
5	Hapoel Ezra	24	–	–	–	49	44	+5	24	
6	Beitar HaTzafon Tel Aviv	24	–	–	–	51	52	−1	23	
7	Maccabi Darom Tel Aviv	24	–	–	–	44	53	−9	23	
8	Hapoel Afeka	24	–	–	–	48	78	−30	22	
9	Beitar Kiryat Matalon	24	–	–	–	44	61	−17	18	
10	Beitar Sheikh Munis	24	–	–	–	34	37	−3	17	
11	Hapoel Bavli Tel Aviv	24	–	–	–	35	57	−22	15	
12	Maccabi Ever HaYarkon	24	–	–	–	29	68	−39	13	
13	Beitar Ganei Tikva	24	–	–	–	9	100	−91	0	

== Jaffa Division ==
Pos	Team	Pld	W	D	L	GF	GA	GD	Pts	Qualification
1	Maccabi Ramla	20	–	–	–	82	20	+62	38	Promotion play-offs
2	Hapoel Bnei Ramla	20	–	–	–	52	8	+44	34	
3	Hapoel Kireon	20	–	–	–	45	27	+18	25	
4	Tzeirei Jaffa	20	–	–	–	59	45	+14	24	
5	Hapoel Neve Monosson	20	–	–	–	44	32	+12	23	
6	Beitar Eli Kireon	20	–	–	–	29	57	−28	16	
7	Beitar Yehud	20	–	–	–	33	41	−8	15	
8	Beitar Jaffa	20	–	–	–	32	74	−42	14	
9	Maccabi Yehud	20	–	–	–	35	54	−19	11	
10	Hapoel HaRakevet Lod	20	–	–	–	26	43	−17	11	
11	Shabab Jaffa	20	–	–	–	14	50	−36	7	

== Central Division ==
Pos	Team	Pld	W	D	L	GF	GA	GD	Pts	Qualification
1	Beitar Beit Dagan	26	–	–	–	106	23	+83	46	Promotion play-offs
2	Hapoel Gedera	26	–	–	–	95	36	+59	40	
3	Maccabi Yavne	26	–	–	–	77	43	+34	37	
4	Beitar Rishon LeZion	26	–	–	–	66	32	+34	36	
5	Maccabi Kfar Gvirol	26	–	–	–	44	43	+1	27	
6	Maccabi Haim Rehovot	26	–	–	–	69	71	−2	26	
7	Hapoel Hatzav	26	–	–	–	32	36	−4	26	
8	Maccabi Kiryat Malakhi	26	–	–	–	45	74	−29	22	
9	Maccabi Ezra UBitzaron	26	–	–	–	35	53	−18	21	
10	Beitar Gedera	26	–	–	–	44	59	−15	18	
11	Hapoel Ezra UBitzaron	26	–	–	–	40	64	−24	17	
12	Beitar Tirat Shalom	26	–	–	–	41	84	−43	17	
13	Maccabi Kiryat Ekron	26	–	–	–	31	84	−53	15	
14	Maccabi Gan Yavne	26	–	–	–	29	52	−23	14	

== Jerusalem Division ==
Pos	Team	Pld	W	D	L	GF	GA	GD	Pts	Qualification
1	Maccabi Kiryat Gat	18	–	–	–	50	20	+30	29	Promotion play-offs
2	Beitar Beit Shemesh	18	–	–	–	54	15	+39	28	
3	Hapoel Beit Safafa	18	–	–	–	39	25	+14	23	
4	ASA Jerusalem	18	–	–	–	39	24	+15	22	
5	Maccabi Beit Shemesh	18	–	–	–	25	32	−7	19	
6	Hapoel Katamonim	18	–	–	–	25	31	−6	16	
7	Hapoel Kiryat Gat	18	–	–	–	35	42	−7	12	
8	Beitar Katamonim	18	–	–	–	20	43	−23	12	
9	Hapoel Beit Shemesh B	18	–	–	–	26	40	−14	11	
10	Beitar Ein Karem	18	–	–	–	22	63	−41	7	

== South Division ==
Pos	Team	Pld	W	D	L	GF	GA	GD	Pts	Qualification
1	Beitar Ashdod	22	–	–	–	65	28	+37	34	Promotion play-offs
2	Hapoel Be'eri	22	–	–	–	54	26	+28	34	
3	Maccabi Ashkelon	22	–	–	–	63	19	+44	32	
4	Maccabi Ashdod	22	–	–	–	56	29	+27	30	
5	Hapoel Gvar'am Yad Mordechai	22	–	–	–	55	32	+23	28	
6	Beitar Ashkelon	22	–	–	–	43	32	+11	26	
7	Hapoel Merhavim	22	–	–	–	36	49	−13	17	
8	Hapoel Sde Uziyahu	22	–	–	–	33	48	−15	15	
9	Hapoel Shimshon Ashkelon	22	–	–	–	34	53	−19	14	
10	Hapoel Or HaNer	22	–	–	–	33	68	−35	11	
11	Hapoel Shtulim	22	–	–	–	22	52	−30	11	
12	Hapoel Beit Ezra	22	–	–	–	23	81	−58	8	

== Negev Division ==
Pos	Team	Pld	W	D	L	GF	GA	GD	Pts	Qualification
1	Hapoel Yeruham	16	–	–	–	38	6	+32	29	Promotion play-offs
2	Beitar Dimona	16	–	–	–	49	19	+30	21	
3	Maccabi Be'er Sheva	16	–	–	–	49	14	+35	20	
4	Beitar Ofakim	16	–	–	–	28	27	+1	20	
5	Hapoel Mitzpe Ramon	16	–	–	–	28	29	−1	17	
6	Shimshon Yeruham	16	–	–	–	28	29	−1	17	
7	Maccabi Dimona	16	–	–	–	27	39	−12	10	
8	Hapoel Mashabei Sadeh	16	–	–	–	14	53	−39	5	
9	Beitar Yeruham	16	–	–	–	8	66	−58	4	

== Promotion play-offs ==
=== North play-offs ===
Pos	Team	Pld	W	D	L	GF	GA	GD	Pts	Promotion
1	Hapoel Beit She'an	6	–	–	–	12	8	+4	7	Promoted to Liga Bet
2	Beitar Acre	6	–	–	–	14	11	+3	7	Promoted to Liga Bet
3	Hapoel Atlit	6	–	–	–	13	11	+2	7	Promoted to Liga Bet
4	Hapoel Zikhron Ya'akov	6	–	–	–	12	7	+5	6	Promoted to Liga Bet
5	Hapoel Shefa-'Amr	6	–	–	–	9	8	+1	6	Remained in Liga Gimel
6	Hapoel Hatzor	6	–	–	–	5	7	−2	4	Remained in Liga Gimel
7	Hapoel Kfar Yona	6	–	–	–	6	19	−13	2	Remained in Liga Gimel

=== South play-offs ===
Pos	Team	Pld	W	D	L	GF	GA	GD	Pts	Promotion
1	Maccabi Ramla	6	–	–	–	14	5	+9	9	Promoted to Liga Bet
2	Beitar Beit Dagan	6	–	–	–	13	7	+6	9	Promoted to Liga Bet
3	Hapoel Rosh HaAyin	6	–	–	–	13	9	+4	8	Promoted to Liga Bet
4	David Tel Aviv	6	–	–	–	14	7	+7	7	Promoted to Liga Bet
5	Beitar Ashdod	6	–	–	–	8	11	−3	5	Remained in Liga Gimel
6	Maccabi Kiryat Gat	6	–	–	–	10	14	−4	4	Remained in Liga Gimel
7	Hapoel Yeruham	6	–	–	–	0	19	−19	0	Remained in Liga Gimel

== See also ==
- 1965–66 Liga Leumit
- 1965–66 Liga Alef
- 1965–66 Liga Bet
