= Omry Perel =

Israeli footballer

Omry Perel עומרי פרל
Personal information
- Date of birth: 15 February 1995 (age 31)
- Place of birth: Israel
- Positions: Midfielder; forward

Team information
- Current team: Ironi Beit Dagan

Youth career
- –2015: Maccabi Tel Aviv

Senior career*
Years	Team	Apps	(Gls)
2012	→ Maccabi Herzliya (loan)	8	(3)
2012–2013	Hapoel Ramat Gan	5	(0)
2013–2015	Hakoah Ramat Gan	36	(4)
2016–2017	Macclesfield Town	1	(0)
2017	Hyde United	6	(4)
2018	Hapoel Herzliya	8	(1)
2019	Shimshon Tel Aviv	17	(12)
2019–2020	Ironi Or Yehuda	21	(6)
2020–2021	Shimshon Tel Aviv	20	(2)
2024–	Ironi Beit Dagan	14	(3)
- * Club domestic league appearances and goals

Omry Perel (Hebrew: עומרי פרל; born 15 February 1995) is an Israeli footballer who plays as a midfielder, winger or forward for Ironi Beit Dagan.

== Career ==
As a youth player, Perel joined the youth academy of Maccabi Tel Aviv, Israel's most successful club.

In 2009, he trialed for the youth academies of FC Utrecht in the Netherlands and Chelsea, one of the most successful English teams.

Before the second half of 2011–12, Perel was sent on loan to Maccabi Herzliya in the Israeli second division, where he said, "I had no desire to play. I lost my desire and was disappointed. I lost the meaning of the football game in my eyes. During this period Alon Hazan called me. "Home to try to persuade me to continue playing football. He influenced me greatly."

In 2012, Perel was sent on loan to Israeli top flight outfit Hapoel Ramat Gan, where he made five appearances and suffered relegation, helping them win the 2012–13 Israel State Cup. On 6 October 2012, he debuted for Hapoel Ramat Gan during a 2–0 loss to Maccabi Haifa.

In 2013, Perel was sent on loan to Hakoah Ramat Gan in the Israeli second division, where he said, "this season in retrospect was the hardest season of my career. A lot of coaches changed, dozens of players came and went. I also had problems in the military at the time and in addition to all of May 2015 I underwent hernia surgery. After a recovery period of 3 months I went back to training with the goal of finding a group, but before I could find a group I had severe stomach pains. There was a concern that I had a bowel disease called colitis. I was forbidden to practice until all the tests were completed and the results returned. By the time I ruled out the disease, I had already reached February 2016, without the possibility of signing with any team in the Premier League."

In 2016, Perel signed for English fifth division side Macclesfield Town, where he said, "the club is a bit similar to the level at the bottom of the [Israeli] national league."

In 2017, he signed for Hyde United in the English seventh division.

In 2018, Perel signed for Israeli third division club Hapoel Herzliya.

Before the second half of 2018–19, he signed for Shimshon Tel Aviv in the Israeli fourth division.
