= Beitar Pardes Katz F.C. =

Israeli football club

Beitar Pardes Katz
- Full name: Beitar Pardes Katz F.C. בית"ר פרדס כץ
- Founded: 1982
- Dissolved: 2007
- League: Liga Gimel Tel Aviv
- 2006–07: 13th

Beitar Pardes Katz, (Hebrew: בית"ר פרדס כץ), was an Israeli football club based in Pardes Katz neighborhood of Bnei Brak.

== History ==
The club was founded in 1982 by amateur footballers and played during its entire existence in the lower leagues of the Israeli football league system, its best achievement being playing in Liga Bet for one season during the 1986–87 season. In 1985–86 the club, while playing in Liga Gimel, reached the 8th round of the cup, after beating Hapoel Majd al-Krum 2 – 1 in the seventh round. The club played Maccabi Tel Aviv in the 8th round and was beaten 0–5.

The club folded at the end of the 2006–07 season. Another club was established in Pardes Katz in 2012, Maccabi Pardes Katz.

== See also ==
- Sports in Israel
