= 1984–85 Liga Bet =

Israeli football season

The 1984–85 Liga Bet season saw Beitar Nahariya, Hapoel Aliyah Kfar Saba, Hapoel Or Yehuda and Hapoel Kiryat Malakhi win their regional divisions and promoted to Liga Alef.

At the bottom, Hapoel Makr, Hapoel Kafr Sumei (from North A division), Hapoel Kafr Qara, Hapoel Emek Hefer (from North B division), Beitar Katamonim, Hapoel Neve Golan (from South A division), Beitar Kiryat Malakhi and Beitar Kiryat Gat (from South B division) were all automatically relegated to Liga Gimel.

== North Division A ==
Pos	Team	Pld	W	D	L	GF	GA	GD	Pts	Promotion or relegation
1	Beitar Nahariya	26	–	–	–	58	15	+43	54	Promoted to Liga Alef
2	Hapoel Bnei Tamra	26	–	–	–	60	36	+24	39	
3	Hapoel Afikim	26	–	–	–	35	34	+1	34	
4	Maccabi Acre	26	–	–	–	46	37	+9	28	
5	Maccabi Bnei Hatzor	26	–	–	–	40	46	−6	27	
6	Maccabi Kiryat Bialik	26	–	–	–	39	33	+6	25	
7	Hapoel Bnei Acre	26	–	–	–	30	30	0	24	
8	Hapoel Abu Snan	26	–	–	–	32	34	−2	23	
9	Hapoel Nahariya	26	–	–	–	40	50	−10	21	
10	Hapoel Iksal	26	–	–	–	30	40	−10	21	
11	Hapoel Majd al-Krum	26	–	–	–	27	45	−18	21	
12	Sektzia Ma'alot	26	–	–	–	36	42	−6	20	
13	Hapoel Makr	26	–	–	–	23	46	−23	20	Relegated to Liga Gimel
14	Hapoel Kafr Sumei	26	–	–	–	23	41	−18	17	Relegated to Liga Gimel

== North Division B ==
Pos	Team	Pld	W	D	L	GF	GA	GD	Pts	Promotion or relegation
1	Hapoel Aliyah Kfar Saba	26	–	–	–	44	24	+20	37	Promoted to Liga Alef
2	Hapoel Umm al-Fahm	26	–	–	–	42	26	+16	36	
3	Hapoel Daliyat al-Karmel	26	–	–	–	38	32	+6	32	
4	Hapoel Givat Olga	26	–	–	–	51	40	+11	27	
5	Hapoel Baqa al-Gharbiyye	26	–	–	–	40	35	+5	27	
6	Maccabi Isfiya	26	–	–	–	37	34	+3	27 (Note: Two points deducted)	
7	Hapoel Beit Eliezer	26	–	–	–	37	39	−2	25	
8	Hapoel Nahliel	26	–	–	–	29	28	+1	24	
9	Hapoel Kafr Sulam	26	–	–	–	34	42	−8	24	
10	Hapoel Tayibe	26	–	–	–	33	48	−15	24	
11	Hapoel Yokneam	26	–	–	–	31	31	0	23	
12	Hapoel Migdal HaEmek	26	–	–	–	34	39	−5	23	
13	Hapoel Kafr Qara	26	–	–	–	23	32	−9	21	Relegated to Liga Gimel
14	Hapoel Emek Hefer	26	–	–	–	22	45	−23	11	Relegated to Liga Gimel

== South Division A ==
Pos	Team	Pld	W	D	L	GF	GA	GD	Pts	Promotion or relegation
1	Hapoel Or Yehuda	26	–	–	–	55	19	+36	42	Promoted to Liga Alef
2	Maccabi Shikun HaMizrah	26	–	–	–	53	27	+26	40	
3	Maccabi Ramla	26	–	–	–	39	30	+9	33	
4	Hapoel Jaljulia	26	–	–	–	51	30	+21	31	
5	Hapoel Tira	26	–	–	–	51	38	+13	31	
6	Maccabi Ramat HaSharon	26	–	–	–	45	40	+5	25	
7	Hapoel Kfar Shalem	26	–	–	–	49	40	+9	24	
8	Hapoel Kafr Qasim	26	–	–	–	33	37	−4	21	
9	Hapoel Mahane Yehuda	26	–	–	–	33	45	−12	21	
10	Beitar Kfar Saba	26	–	–	–	27	35	−8	20	
11	Maccabi Herzliya	26	–	–	–	23	32	−9	20	
12	Hapoel Herzliya	26	–	–	–	29	42	−13	20	
13	Beitar Katamonim	26	–	–	–	32	55	−23	20	Relegated to Liga Gimel
14	Hapoel Neve Golan	26	–	–	–	14	64	−50	16	Relegated to Liga Gimel

== South Division B ==
Pos	Team	Pld	W	D	L	GF	GA	GD	Pts	Promotion or relegation
1	Hapoel Kiryat Malakhi	26	–	–	–	46	21	+25	38	Promoted to Liga Alef
2	SK Nes Tziona	26	–	–	–	42	22	+20	36	
3	Maccabi Kiryat Ekron	26	–	–	–	39	23	+16	32	
4	Ironi Ashdod	26	–	–	–	34	23	+11	32	
5	Maccabi Rehovot	26	–	–	–	42	37	+5	31	
6	Hapoel Sderot	26	–	–	–	34	25	+9	28	
7	Hapoel Merhavim	26	–	–	–	52	29	+23	27	
8	Maccabi Ramat Ben Zvi	26	–	–	–	37	38	−1	26	
9	Hapoel Ashdod	26	–	–	–	29	28	+1	25	
10	Hapoel Be'er Ya'akov	26	–	–	–	30	44	−14	22	
11	Hapoel Eilat	26	–	–	–	34	47	−13	20	
12	Beitar Lod	26	–	–	–	36	63	−27	18	
13	Beitar Kiryat Malakhi	26	–	–	–	16	42	−26	14	Relegated to Liga Gimel
14	Beitar Kiryat Gat	26	–	–	–	20	49	−29	11 (Note: Four points deducted)	Relegated to Liga Gimel
