= 1985–86 Liga Alef =

Israeli football season

The 1985–86 Liga Alef season saw Hapoel Beit She'an (champions of the North Division) and Hapoel Dimona (champions of the South Division) win the title and promotion to Liga Artzit. Beitar Nahariya also promoted after promotion play-offs.

== North Division ==
Pos	Team	Pld	W	D	L	GF	GA	GD	Pts	Promotion or relegation
1	Hapoel Beit She'an	26	–	–	–	51	23	+28	36	Promoted to Liga Artzit
2	Beitar Nahariya	26	–	–	–	35	25	+10	34	Promotion play-offs
3	Maccabi Hadera	26	–	–	–	41	30	+11	31	
4	Hapoel Kiryat Ata	26	–	–	–	22	20	+2	29	
5	Hapoel Kiryat Shmona	26	–	–	–	29	29	0	27	
6	Hapoel Aliyah Kfar Saba	26	–	–	–	35	34	+1	26	
7	Hapoel Ra'anana	26	–	–	–	24	26	−2	25	
8	Maccabi Ahi Nazareth	26	–	–	–	36	39	−3	24	
9	Hapoel Tirat HaCarmel	26	–	–	–	28	43	−15	24	
10	Maccabi Afula	26	–	–	–	21	33	−12	23	
11	Maccabi Tamra	26	–	–	–	37	36	+1	22	
12	Maccabi Or Akiva	26	–	–	–	31	33	−2	21	
13	Hapoel Nazareth Illit	26	–	–	–	23	31	−8	21	Relegated to Liga Bet
14	Maccabi Shefa-'Amr	26	–	–	–	30	41	−11	21	Relegated to Liga Bet

== South Division ==
Pos	Team	Pld	W	D	L	GF	GA	GD	Pts	Promotion or relegation
1	Hapoel Dimona	24	–	–	–	28	12	+16	32	Promoted to Liga Artzit
2	Hapoel Rishon LeZion	24	–	–	–	28	16	+12	30	Promotion play-offs
3	Beitar Be'er Sheva	24	–	–	–	24	16	+8	29	
4	Maccabi Lazarus Holon	24	–	–	–	22	16	+6	29	
5	Hapoel Ashkelon	24	–	–	–	14	14	0	25	
6	Hapoel Kiryat Malakhi	24	–	–	–	23	20	+3	24	
7	Hapoel Bat Yam	24	–	–	–	18	19	−1	24	
8	Hapoel Kiryat Ono	24	–	–	–	18	23	−5	22	
9	Maccabi Kiryat Gat	24	–	–	–	22	24	−2	21	
10	Hapoel Or Yehuda	24	–	–	–	18	26	−8	21	
11	Hapoel Azor	24	–	–	–	16	22	−6	20	
12	Hapoel Yeruham	24	–	–	–	8	19	−11	19	
13	Maccabi HaShikma Ramat Gan	24	–	–	–	15	27	−12	16	Relegated to Liga Bet

Tzafririm Holon merged with Liga Artzit club, Hapoel Holon. thus, leaving the league with 13 clubs.

== Promotion play-offs ==
3.5.86

Hapoel Rishon LeZion	2 – 2	Beitar Nahariya
Hajaj (84), Gabson (88)		M.Alfasi (63), Cohen (79)

Ramat Gan Stadium
Attendance: 1000
Referee: Ovadia Zvi
10.5.86

Beitar Nahariya	2 – 1	Hapoel Rishon LeZion
Cohen (12), Daoud (54)		Masubi (33)

Ramat Gan Stadium
Attendance: 2500
Referee: Moshe Ashkenazi

Beitar Nahariya promoted to Liga Artzit.
