= 1978–79 Liga Alef =

Israeli football season

The 1978–79 Liga Alef season saw Hapoel Nazareth Illit (champions of the North Division) and Hapoel Beit Shemesh (champions of the South Division) win the title and promotion to Liga Artzit.

Promotion play-offs, held in neutral venue, introduced between the second placed clubs in each regional division. Hapoel Herzliya won over Maccabi Kiryat Gat, and became the third promoted club.

== North Division ==
Pos	Team	Pld	W	D	L	GF	GA	GD	Pts	Promotion or relegation
1	Hapoel Nazareth Illit	26	16	6	4	45	29	+16	38	Promoted to Liga Artzit
2	Hapoel Herzliya	26	11	10	5	32	21	+11	32	Promotion play-offs
3	Maccabi Hadera	26	14	3	9	41	21	+20	31	
4	Hapoel Givat Olga	26	10	9	7	22	20	+2	29	
5	Hapoel Nahariya	26	10	9	7	32	32	0	29	
6	Hapoel Afikim	26	11	5	10	43	31	+12	27	
7	Beitar Netanya	26	11	5	10	39	31	+8	27	
8	Hapoel Ra'anana	26	11	5	10	41	37	+4	27	
9	Hapoel Kiryat Ata	26	7	9	10	24	26	−2	23	
10	Maccabi Ahi Nazareth	26	8	7	11	30	36	−6	23	
11	Hapoel Kiryat Shmona	26	7	9	10	28	37	−9	23	
12	Hapoel Tel Hanan	25	8	6	11	21	23	−2	22	
13	Hapoel Nahliel	26	4	10	12	14	29	−15	18	Relegated to Liga Bet
14	Hapoel Givat Haim	25	3	7	15	21	60	−39	13	Relegated to Liga Bet

== South Division ==
Pos	Team	Pld	W	D	L	GF	GA	GD	Pts	Promotion or relegation
1	Hapoel Beit Shemesh	26	16	5	5	53	22	+31	37	Promoted to Liga Artzit
2	Maccabi Kiryat Gat	26	11	13	2	35	16	+19	35	Promotion play-offs
3	Hapoel Kafr Qasim	26	12	10	4	40	35	+5	34	
4	Maccabi Sha'arayim	26	11	10	5	43	25	+18	32	
5	Beitar Ramla	26	10	11	5	30	22	+8	31	
6	Hapoel Ashkelon	26	9	7	10	41	38	+3	25	
7	Lazarus Holon	26	9	6	11	34	39	−5	24	
8	Hapoel Ramla	26	5	13	8	30	33	−3	23	
9	Maccabi Yavne	26	6	11	9	22	26	−4	23	
10	Hapoel Dimona	26	7	9	10	28	40	−12	23	
11	Hapoel Or Yehuda	26	7	8	11	29	35	−6	22	
12	Hapoel Kiryat Ono	26	6	9	11	23	33	−10	21	
13	SK Nes Tziona	26	5	8	13	27	41	−14	16 (Note: 2 points deducted.)	Relegated to Liga Bet
14	Beitar Ashdod	26	4	8	14	25	55	−30	16	Relegated to Liga Bet

== Promotion play-offs ==
19.5.1979

Hapoel Herzliya	3 – 1	Maccabi Kiryat Gat

Hapoel Petah Tikva
Attendance: 3,500
Referee: Yair Tilinger

Hapoel Herzliya promoted to Liga Artzit.
