= Shlomi Dahan =

Israeli footballer

Shlomi Dahan שלומי דהאן
Personal information
- Date of birth: 30 September 1979 (age 47)
- Place of birth: Israel
- Position: Defensive midfielder

Youth career
- –1996: Maccabi Netanya
- 1996–1998: Borussia Dortmund

Senior career*
Years	Team	Apps	(Gls)
1998–2000	Borussia Dortmund	0	(0)
1998–1999	→ Maccabi Haifa (loan)	1	(0)
1999–2000	→ Maccabi Netanya (loan)	51	(3)
2000–2005	Maccabi Netanya	15	(0)
2001–2002	→ Ironi Rishon LeZion (loan)	7	(0)
2002	→ Tzafririm Holon (loan)		
2003–2005	→ Hapoel Nir Ramat HaSharon (loan)		
2005–2006	Hapoel Afula		
2006–2011	Beitar Shimshon Tel Aviv	136	(2)
2011	Maccabi Daliyat al-Karmel	3	(0)
2011–2012	Maccabi Ironi Kfar Yona	16	(1)
2013	Maccabi HaSharon Netanya	4	(3)
2013–2014	F.C. Baqa	11	(5)
2016–2019	Maccabi HaSharon Netanya	24	(6)

International career
2000	Israel U-21	3	(0)

Managerial career
- 2014–2015: Maccabi HaSharon Netanya
- * Club domestic league appearances and goals

Shlomi Dahan (Hebrew: שלומי דהאן; born 30 September 1979) is an Israeli former professional footballer who now works as a manager. Dahan is often referred to as one of Israel's greatest wastes of talent and was the subject of a documentary in Israel on why Israel has yet to produce quality footballers and the hardships they face in improving in the Israeli system of football.

== Playing career ==
Dahan was a product of the Maccabi Netanya youth system where he managed to catch the eye of a scout from German club Borussia Dortmund. He left Netanya for Dortmund along with Amos Sassi where the two enjoyed great success even capturing a world title in a tournament for ORT high schools.

Both Dahan and Sassi excelled at Dortmund, even taking the German youth championship while there. But in order to be able to play for Israel's full national team, they had to complete their mandatory service in the Israel Defense Forces. Both were loaned out to Maccabi Haifa where they languished on the bench. He later moved to Maccabi Netanya helping them win promotion to the first league in 1999.

In 2006 Dahan moved to Beitar Shimshon Tel Aviv and played there for 5 seasons helping the team win promotion to Liga Leumit in 2008–09. He was also a part of the shocking State Cup win against Maccabi Tel Aviv that took place on 26 February 2008.

In September 2011 he moved to Maccabi Daliyat al-Karmel from Liga Alef (North).

In November 2011 after only two months with Daliyat al-Karmel he made a move to Maccabi Ironi Kfar Yona from the bottom of Liga Alef (South).

== Honours ==
- Israeli Second Division: 1998–99
- Liga Artzit: 2003–04
- Toto Cup Artzit: 2003–04
