= Hapoel Avraham Be'er Sheva F.C. =

- Full name: Hapoel Avraham Be'er Sheva Football Club הפועל אברהם באר שבע
- Founded: 1962
- Dissolved: 1965
- League: Liga Bet South B
- 1964–65: 3rd

Hapoel Avraham Be'er Sheva (Hebrew: הפועל אברהם באר שבע) was an Israeli football club based in Be'er Sheva. The club served as feeder team for Hapoel Be'er Sheva.

== History ==
The club played in Liga Gimel until it won its division in 1963 and was promoted to third tier Liga Bet. The club played two seasons in Liga Bet, twice finishing third, missing out on promotion by 7 points in each time.

In 1965, the club was merged with Hapoel Dimona after Hapoel Be'er Sheva sold Hapoel Avraham to the municipality of Dimona, appearing as Hapoel Avraham Dimona for the 1964–65 season, but reverting to being named Hapoel Dimona in later seasons.

In 1966, Hapoel Be'er Sheva established an U-20 team and named it Hapoel Avraham Be'er Sheva. The club played in the Youth League, winning the state championship in 1969. In 1970 the youth team's name was changed to Hapoel HaShlosha Be'er Sheva (lit. Hapoel The Three Be'er Sheva), in remembrance of three Be'er Sheva workers who died while working for the team's sponsor, Makhteshim.

== Honours ==
=== League ===
Honour	No.	Years
Fourth tier	1	1962–63
Youth League	1	1968–69

== See also ==
- Hapoel Be'er Sheva
- F.C. Dimona
