= 1981–82 Liga Bet =

Association football season

The 1981–82 Liga Bet season saw Maccabi Bnei Hatzor, Hapoel Nahliel, Tzafririm Holon and Ironi Ashdod win their regional divisions and promoted to Liga Alef.

At the bottom, Maccabi Neve Sha'anan, Beitar Nahariya (from North A division), Maccabi Fureidis, Maccabi HaSharon Netanya (from North B division), Hapoel Ganei Tikva, Hapoel Kiryat Shalom (from South A division), Hapoel Bnei Zion and Hapoel Mevaseret Zion (from South B division) were all automatically relegated to Liga Gimel.

== North Division A ==
Pos	Team	Pld	W	D	L	GF	GA	GD	Pts	Promotion or relegation
1	Maccabi Bnei Hatzor	26	–	–	–	53	16	+37	40	Promoted to Liga Alef
2	Maccabi Afula	26	–	–	–	41	31	+10	31	
3	Hapoel Safed	26	–	–	–	31	32	−1	28	
4	Maccabi Kiryat Bialik	26	–	–	–	32	30	+2	26	
5	Sektzia Ma'alot	26	–	–	–	29	31	−2	25	
6	Hapoel Ein Mahil	26	–	–	–	34	42	−8	25	
7	Maccabi Tamra	26	–	–	–	36	29	+7	24	
8	Maccabi Ahi Nazareth	26	–	–	–	35	36	−1	24	
9	Maccabi Acre	26	–	–	–	31	34	−3	24	
10	Hapoel Bnei Acre	26	–	–	–	30	35	−5	24	
11	Hapoel Makr	26	–	–	–	27	34	−7	24	
12	Hapoel Bnei Rameh	26	–	–	–	30	42	−12	24	
13	Maccabi Neve Sha'anan	26	–	–	–	32	34	−2	23	Relegated to Liga Gimel
14	Beitar Nahariya	26	–	–	–	25	43	−18	16	Relegated to Liga Gimel

== North Division B ==
Pos	Team	Pld	W	D	L	GF	GA	GD	Pts	Promotion or relegation
1	Hapoel Nahliel	26	–	–	–	44	18	+26	38	Promoted to Liga Alef
2	Hapoel HaTzair Kiryat Haim (Note: Hapoel HaTzair Haifa became Hapoel HaTzair Kiryat Haim.)	26	–	–	–	31	22	+9	33	
3	Hapoel Kafr Sulam	26	–	–	–	51	27	+24	32	
4	Hapoel Netanya	26	–	–	–	46	31	+15	32	
5	Maccabi Or Akiva	26	–	–	–	42	29	+13	27	
6	Hapoel Aliyah Kfar Saba	26	–	–	–	39	37	+2	27	
7	Hapoel Afula	26	–	–	–	42	37	+5	25	
8	Hapoel Umm al-Fahm	26	–	–	–	25	28	−3	21	
9	Hapoel Kafr Qara	26	–	–	–	33	40	−7	21	
10	Hapoel Daliyat al-Karmel	26	–	–	–	26	51	−25	21 (Note: Maccabi HaSharon Netanya appeared with only six players for their match against Hapoel Daliyat al-Karmel, which won by forfeit.)	
11	Hapoel Emek Hefer (Note: Hapoel Givat Haim became Hapoel Emek Hefer, representing their Regional Council, Emek Hefer, rather than their Kibbutz.)	26	–	–	–	27	36	−9	20	
12	Hapoel Tayibe	26	–	–	–	20	29	−9	20	
13	Maccabi Fureidis	26	–	–	–	27	48	−21	20	Relegated to Liga Gimel
14	Maccabi HaSharon Netanya	26	–	–	–	34	39	−5	16	Relegated to Liga Gimel

== South Division A ==
Pos	Team	Pld	W	D	L	GF	GA	GD	Pts	Promotion or relegation
1	Tzafririm Holon	26	–	–	–	59	21	+38	40	Promoted to Liga Alef
2	Hapoel Jaljulia	26	–	–	–	44	25	+19	35	
3	Maccabi HaShikma Ramat Gan	26	–	–	–	39	24	+15	32	
4	Hapoel Tira	26	–	–	–	39	35	+4	29	
5	Hapoel Kafr Qasim	26	–	–	–	33	35	−2	29	
6	Hapoel Or Yehuda	26	–	–	–	35	37	−2	26	
7	Hapoel Kfar Shalem	26	–	–	–	28	31	−3	26	
8	Hapoel Ihud Tzeirei Jaffa	26	–	–	–	40	30	+10	25	
9	Hapoel Mahane Yehuda	26	–	–	–	26	26	0	25	
10	Hapoel Tel Mond	26	–	–	–	50	57	−7	23	
11	Hapoel Rosh HaAyin	26	–	–	–	33	36	−3	22	
12	Hapoel Neve Golan	26	–	–	–	32	38	−6	21	
13	Hapoel Ganei Tikva	26	–	–	–	25	53	−28	16	Relegated to Liga Gimel
14	Hapoel Kiryat Shalom	26	–	–	–	27	62	−35	13	Relegated to Liga Gimel

== South Division B ==
Pos	Team	Pld	W	D	L	GF	GA	GD	Pts	Promotion or relegation
1	Ironi Ashdod (Note: Maccabi Ashdod merged with Beitar Ashdod to form Maccabi Ironi Ashdod.)	24	–	–	–	49	13	+36	40	Promoted to Liga Alef
2	Hapoel Merhavim	24	–	–	–	44	27	+17	29	
3	Hapoel Kiryat Malakhi	24	–	–	–	43	27	+16	28	
4	Hapoel Gedera	24	–	–	–	32	35	−3	25	
5	SK Nes Tziona	24	–	–	–	28	33	−5	24	
6	Maccabi Be'er Sheva	24	–	–	–	28	34	−6	24	
7	Hapoel Sderot	24	–	–	–	53	49	+4	23	
8	Maccabi Rehovot	24	–	–	–	32	30	+2	22	
9	Maccabi Ashkelon	24	–	–	–	28	32	−4	22	
10	Beitar Lod	24	–	–	–	28	36	−8	22	
11	Hapoel Be'er Ya'akov	24	–	–	–	36	42	−6	20	
12	Hapoel Ofakim	24	–	–	–	33	39	−6	20	
13	Hapoel Bnei Zion	24	–	–	–	21	60	−39	14	Relegated to Liga Gimel

Notes:

Hapoel Mevaseret Zion suspended from the league and demoted to Liga Gimel.
