= Amos Sassi =

Israeli footballer

Amos Sassi עמוס סאסי
Personal information
- Date of birth: 29 January 1979 (age 47)
- Place of birth: Israel
- Height: 1.75 m (5 ft 9 in)
- Position: Left-back

Youth career
- Maccabi Netanya
- Borussia Dortmund

Senior career*
Years	Team	Apps	(Gls)
1998–2000	Borussia Dortmund	0	(0)
1999–2000	→ Maccabi Haifa (loan)	6	(0)
2000–2002	Maccabi Netanya	38	(1)
2002–2004	Borussia Dortmund II	65	(1)
2004	Maccabi Netanya	4	(0)
2005	Ironi Nir Ramat HaSharon		
2006–2018	Maccabi Los Angeles	126	(0)

International career
2000	Israel U21	1	(0)
- * Club domestic league appearances and goals

Amos Sassi (Hebrew: עמוס סאסי; born 29 January 1979) is an Israeli former professional footballer who played as a left-back.

== Career ==
Sassi was a product of the Maccabi Netanya youth system where he managed to catch the eye of a scout from German club Borussia Dortmund. He left Netanya for Dortmund along with Shlomi Dahan.

Both Dahan and Sassi excelled at Dortmund, even taking the German youth championship while there. But in order to be able to play for Israel's full national team, they had to complete their mandatory service in the Israel Defense Forces. Both were loaned out to Maccabi Haifa where they languished on the bench. After a short period in Haifa, Sassi moved to Maccabi Netanya and in 2005 he retired after an unsuccessful spell with Ironi Nir Ramat HaSharon.

In 2024, Amos is expected to participate in the popular Israeli TV show 'The Big Brother,' where he anticipates regaining public attention, according to his own words.
