= 1983–84 Liga Alef =

Israeli football season

The 1983–84 Liga Alef season saw Hapoel Tiberias (champions of the North Division) and Maccabi Sha'arayim (champions of the South Division) win the title and promotion to Liga Artzit. Hapoel Ramat HaSharon also promoted after promotion play-offs.

== North Division ==
Pos	Team	Pld	W	D	L	GF	GA	GD	Pts	Promotion or relegation
1	Hapoel Tiberias	26	14	10	2	47	23	+24	38	Promoted to Liga Artzit
2	Beitar Netanya	26	12	11	3	47	20	+27	35	Promotion play-offs
3	Maccabi Shefa-'Amr	26	13	9	4	47	26	+21	35	
4	Maccabi Afula	26	9	13	4	24	15	+9	31	
5	Hapoel Acre	26	11	8	7	42	28	+14	30	
6	Hapoel Bnei Nazareth	26	8	9	9	29	35	−6	25	
7	Maccabi Ahi Nazareth	26	9	7	10	28	37	−9	25	
8	Hapoel Tirat HaCarmel	26	8	8	10	37	35	+2	24	
9	Hapoel Ra'anana	26	6	11	9	26	28	−2	23	
10	Maccabi Hadera	26	7	9	10	32	35	−3	23	
11	Hapoel Tel Hanan	26	5	13	8	32	37	−5	23	
12	Hapoel Kiryat Ata	26	7	8	11	34	42	−8	22	
13	Maccabi Bnei Hatzor	26	5	11	10	34	36	−2	21	Relegated to Liga Bet
14	Hapoel Migdal HaEmek	26	2	5	19	14	66	−52	7 (Note: 2 points deducted?)	Relegated to Liga Bet

== South Division ==
Pos	Team	Pld	W	D	L	GF	GA	GD	Pts	Promotion or relegation
1	Maccabi Sha'arayim	26	14	11	1	36	14	+22	39	Promoted to Liga Artzit
2	Hapoel Ramat HaSharon	26	9	13	4	31	29	+2	31	Promotion play-offs
3	Hapoel Ihud Tzeirei Jaffa	26	10	8	8	32	30	+2	28	
4	Hapoel Kiryat Ono	26	8	11	7	31	26	+5	27	
5	Hapoel Azor	26	7	13	6	24	22	+2	27	
6	Maccabi Lazarus Holon	26	9	8	9	29	28	+1	26	
7	Hapoel Bat Yam	26	8	9	9	29	30	−1	25	
8	Beitar Be'er Sheva	26	7	11	8	23	24	−1	25	
9	Maccabi Kiryat Gat	26	7	11	8	20	24	−4	24 (Note: One point deducted)	
10	Hapoel Yeruham	26	9	6	11	24	33	−9	24	
11	Tzafririm Holon	26	8	7	11	31	37	−6	23	
12	Hapoel Ramla	26	7	10	9	24	21	+3	22 (Note: Two points deducted)	
13	Ironi Ashdod	26	8	6	12	29	35	−6	22	Relegated to Liga Bet
14	Maccabi Herzliya	26	5	8	13	23	33	−10	18	Relegated to Liga Bet

== Promotion play-offs ==
28 April 1984

Hapoel Ramat HaSharon	1 – 0	Beitar Netanya

Winter Stadium
5 May 1984

Beitar Netanya	1 – 1	Hapoel Ramat HaSharon

Winter Stadium

Hapoel Ramat HaSharon promoted to Liga Artzit.
