= 1970–71 Liga Alef =

Israeli football season

The 1970–71 Liga Alef season saw Maccabi Jaffa (champions of the North Division) and Hapoel Be'er Sheva (champions of the South Division) win the title and promotion to Liga Leumit.

== North Division ==
Pos	Team	Pld	W	D	L	GF	GA	GD	Pts	Promotion or relegation
1	Maccabi Jaffa	30	21	8	1	66	14	+52	50	Promoted to Liga Leumit
2	Hapoel Ramat Gan	30	21	7	2	54	16	+38	49	
3	Hapoel Kiryat Shmona	30	16	8	6	54	29	+25	40	
4	Hapoel Acre	30	14	7	9	45	31	+14	35	
5	Hapoel Nahariya	30	14	5	11	49	46	+3	33	
6	Beitar Netanya	30	12	5	13	40	45	−5	29	
7	Hapoel Tiberias	30	7	14	9	38	48	−10	28	
8	Hapoel Herzliya	30	9	10	11	38	51	−13	28	
9	Hapoel Bnei Nazareth	30	10	7	13	49	48	+1	27	
10	Maccabi Herzliya	30	8	10	12	32	32	0	26	
11	Hapoel Netanya	30	9	8	13	42	50	−8	26	
12	Hapoel Nahliel	30	8	9	13	45	53	−8	25	
13	Hapoel Tirat HaCarmel	30	6	13	11	38	51	−13	25	
14	Hapoel Mahane Yehuda	30	7	9	14	20	46	−26	23	
15	Hapoel Zikhron Ya'akov	30	6	7	17	33	55	−22	19	Relegated to Liga Bet
16	Maccabi Hadera	30	5	7	18	24	52	−28	17	Relegated to Liga Bet

== South Division ==
Pos	Team	Pld	W	D	L	GF	GA	GD	Pts	Promotion or relegation
1	Hapoel Be'er Sheva	30	22	6	2	81	23	+58	50	Promoted to Liga Leumit
2	Hapoel Yehud	30	14	8	8	48	42	+6	36	
3	Maccabi Ramat Amidar	30	13	9	8	47	34	+13	35	
4	Hapoel Kiryat Ono	30	12	10	8	57	39	+18	34	
5	Maccabi Sha'arayim	30	15	2	13	63	49	+14	32	
6	Hapoel Marmorek	30	12	8	10	52	46	+6	32	
7	Hapoel Bat Yam	30	12	7	11	36	24	+12	31	
8	Hapoel Rishon LeZion	30	12	7	11	64	67	−3	31	
9	Hapoel Be'er Ya'akov	30	11	9	10	53	64	−11	31	
10	Hapoel Lod	30	10	9	11	37	52	−15	29	
11	Hapoel Eilat	30	11	6	13	40	41	−1	28	
12	Hapoel Ashkelon	30	11	6	13	37	44	−7	28	
13	Hapoel Beit Shemesh	30	10	6	14	29	48	−19	26	
14	Beitar Ramla	30	7	9	14	43	57	−14	23	
15	SK Nes Tziona	30	4	11	15	33	64	−31	19	Relegated to Liga Bet
16	Beitar Lod	30	3	9	18	32	61	−29	15	Relegated to Liga Bet
