= Hapoel Givat Haim F.C. =

Hapoel Givat Haim
- Full name: Hapoel Givat Haim Football Club הפועל גבעת חיים
- Founded: 1946
- Dissolved: 1987
- Ground: Givat Haim Ground, Givat Haim Ihud
Home colours	Away colours

Hapoel Givat Haim (Hebrew: הפועל גבעת חיים) was an Israeli football club based in the Kibbutz of Givat Haim Ihud.

== History ==
The club was founded in 1946 by Hungarian Jews which immigrated to Mandatory Palestine following the end of the Second World War, and settled in Givat Haim. The original team consisted of footballers which have played for clubs from the upper tiers of Hungarian football league system, prior to the Second World War.

Givat Haim did not play league games until 1949, when they joined Liga Meuhedet, the temporary second division of Israeli football in the 1949–50 season, the first after Israeli independence. Although the club was folded one year later, after most of its players left for new settlements, it was reformed in 1954 and joined Liga Gimel, then the fourth tier, in the 1955–56 season. In their first season in Liga Gimel, Givat Haim won the Samaria division and qualified for the promotion play-offs against Hapoel clubs from Tiberias, Kfar Ata, Safed and Zikhron Ya'akov. Despite a victory of 6–2 against Hapoel Tiberias, Givat Haim failed to achieve promotion, and remained in Liga Gimel until the 1958–59 season, when they won the Samaria division and were promoted to Liga Bet.

In the 1962–63 season, Givat Haim finished third in Liga Bet North B division and were promoted to Liga Alef, then the second tier. In the following season, the club finished bottom of Liga Alef North division and dropped back to Liga Bet. During the season, the club suffered a heavy defeat of 2–12 at the hands of the league winners, Maccabi Netanya, which broke their goal-scoring record at that match. In the next seasons, Givat Haim was one of the top contenders in Liga Bet North B division. However, they had to wait until the end of the 1971–72 season, when they faced Hapoel Ra'anana in the last match of the season. Givat Haim turned a deficit of 0–2 into victory of 3–2 and were promoted to Liga Alef instead of their opponents, thanks to a better goal difference. In the following season, the club finished once more at the bottom of Liga Alef North division and relegated to Liga Bet. In the 1975–76 season, the club finished second bottom in Liga Bet North B division and suffered another relegation, this time to Liga Gimel, which became the fifth tier, following the creation of Liga Artzit. Givat Haim made an immediate return to Liga Bet at the end of the 1976–77 season, and were promoted to Liga Alef (now as the third tier), after finished runners-up in Liga Bet North B division at the 1977–78 season. Thus, the club achieved two successive promotions. However, the yo-yo pattern continued, as the club finished the 1978–79 season at the bottom place of Liga Alef North division and dropped back to Liga Bet.

Prior to the 1981–82 season, the club was renamed Hapoel Emek Hefer, representing the Hefer Valley Regional Council, where Givat Haim is located, rather than the Kibbutz. As Hapoel Emek Hefer, the club mostly battled against relegation, and were eventually relegated to Liga Gimel after finished bottom of the North B division in the 1984–85 season. Hapoel Emek Hefer folded at the end of the 1986–87 season.

Currently, teams from Givat Haim are playing at the Hefer Valley regional leagues, which were not affiliated with the Israel Football Association.

== Honours ==
=== League ===
Honour	No.	Years
Third tier	1	1971–72
Fourth tier	2	1955–56, 1958–59
Fifth tier	1	1976–77
