= Hapoel Zikhron Ya'akov F.C. =

Hapoel Zikhron Ya'akov
- Full name: Hapoel Zikhron Ya'akov Football Club הפועל זכרון יעקב
- Founded: 1947; 1963 (Refounded)
- Dissolved: 1995
- Ground: Maccabi Zikhron Ya'akov Ground, Zikhron Ya'akov

Hapoel Zikhron Ya'akov (Hebrew: הפועל זכרון יעקב) was an Israeli football club based in Zikhron Ya'akov. The club played two seasons in the second tier of Israeli football league system.

== History ==
The club was founded in 1947 and played mostly in the lower divisions of Israeli football. Hapoel played their first football season in Liga Meuhedet, the temporary second tier in the 1949–50 season, where they finished sixth in the Samaria division, and were placed in Liga Bet, the second tier of Israeli football at the time. However, Hapoel withdrew from the 1951–52 season and were automatically relegated to Liga Gimel. The club was dissolved in 1958 due to financial problems, and reformed five years later, in 1963. In the 1965–66 season, Hapoel won Liga Gimel Samaria division, and after Promotion play-offs, were promoted to Liga Bet. In the 1969–70, the club won Liga Bet North B division and promoted to Liga Alef, the second tier at the time. However, the club's spell in Liga Alef lasted only one season, as they finished second bottom in the North division at the 1970–71 season and relegated back to Liga Bet. In the 1973–74 season, the club finished bottom in the North B division, and after Relegation play-offs, were relegated to Liga Gimel.

Prior to the 1995–96 season, the club merged with local rivals Maccabi Zikhron Ya'akov to create Ironi Zikhron Ya'akov. The merged club was dissolved at the end of the 1999–2000 season, following relegation from Liga Bet to Liga Gimel.

== Honours ==
=== League ===
Honour	No.	Years
Third tier	1	1969–70
Fourth tier	2	1955–56, 1965–66
