= Pardes Katz =

Pardes Katz פָּרְדֵס כָּץ
- Neighbourhood
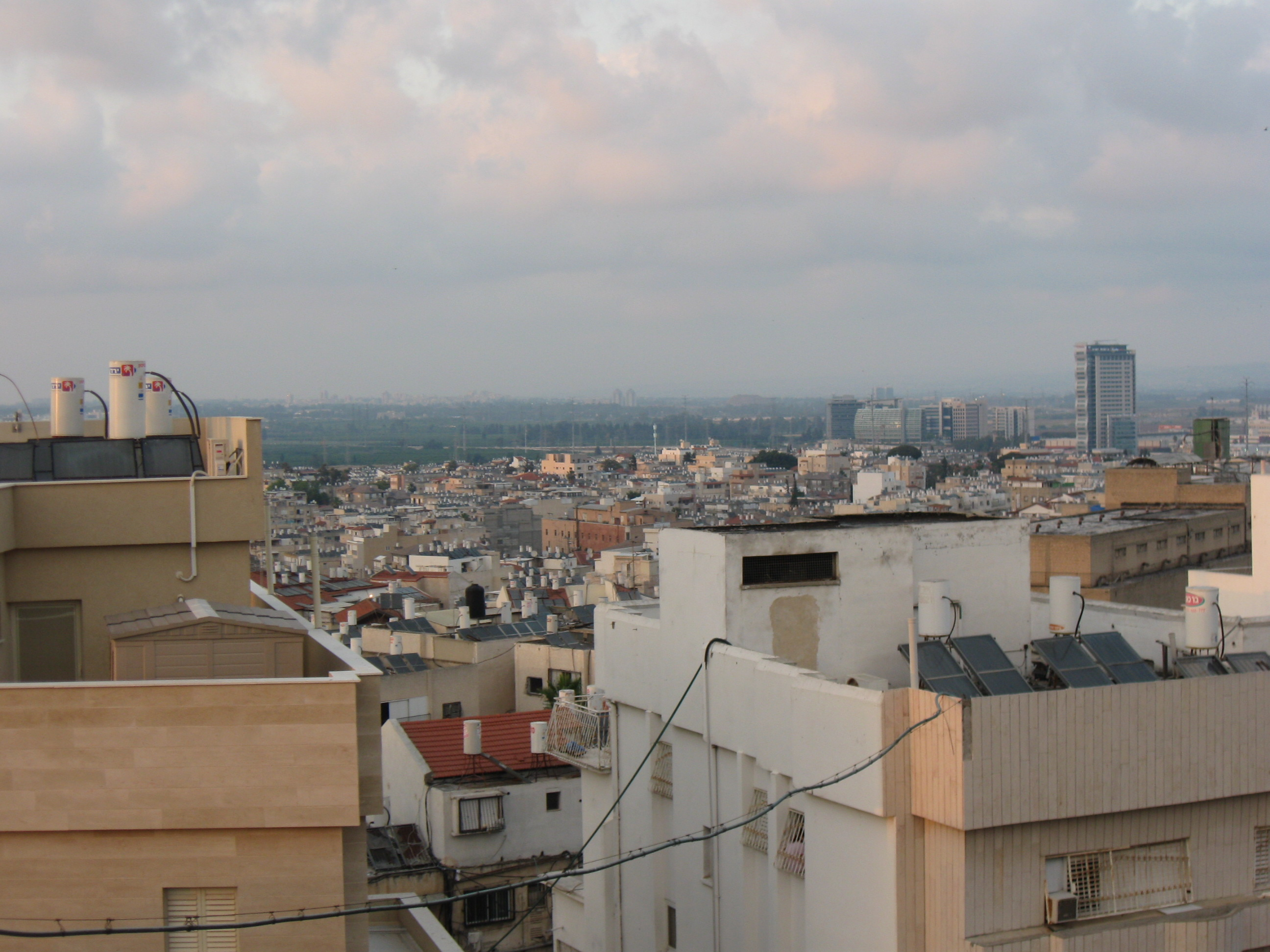
- Interactive map of Pardes Katz
- Coordinates: 32°06′N 34°50′E
- Country: Israel
- District: Tel Aviv District
- City: Bnei Brak

Pardes Katz (Hebrew: פָּרְדֵס כָּץ) is a neighborhood in the northern part of the city of Bnei Brak in Tel Aviv District. Covering an area of about 300 hectares (740 acres), the neighborhood has roughly 30,000 inhabitants, most of them secular hilonim and traditional masortim. This is the only neighborhood in Bnei Brak where most of its residents are not haredi. The neighborhood borders the city of Ramat Gan West (also zone called Tel Giborim), Petah Tikva East, the rest of Bnei Brak to the south and the industrial area north of Bnei Brak.

== History ==
The neighborhood is named after its founder, Haim Moshe Katz, a native of Poland who made his fortune in the United States. He immigrated to Israel in 1926, and purchased 173 acres (70 ha) of orchards on the road from Tel Aviv to Petah Tikva, north of Bnei Brak. In the wake of the global economic crisis of 1929, parts of the orchards stopped being used, and in October 1933 they were offered for sale as private building plots. In the second phase of the construction of the neighborhood, in November 1934, the name of the neighborhood is Tel Ephraim after Katz's son, Ephraim (Freddie) Katz. In July 1936, the health department of Mandatory Palestine rented Katz's own orchard, and established the government Hospital for Infectious Diseases. Until 1947, there were about 70 houses in the neighborhood. In its early years, Pardes Katz, was considered a prime location, due to the large open spaces in and around the orchards.

At the beginning, the neighborhood was home to immigrants from Turkey, Yemen, Poland and Iraq. Later, many left the camp and were replaced by Maghrebi Jewish immigrants. The passage of public shacks used initially as a neighborhood school, HMO and a Tipat Halav childcare center, later transferred to the school, initially called "Histadrut", to the west, the second part of the neighborhood, and its name was changed to "Komemiyut".

As of the 21st century, the neighborhood is a community of housing, culture, cafes, and shops.

== See also ==
- Tourism in Israel
