= Beitar al-Amal Nazareth F.C. =

Israeli football club

Beitar al-Amal Nazareth
- Full name: Beitar al-Amal Nazareth Football Club בית"ר אל עמל נצרת
- Founded: 1964
- Ground: Ilut Stadium
- Chairman: George Kharma
- Manager: George Kharma
- 2015–16: Liga Gimel Jezreel, – (folded)
| Home colours | Away colours |

Beitar al-Amal Nazareth (Arabic: بيتار العمل الناصرة) (Hebrew: בית"ר אל עמל נצרת) is an Israeli football club based in Nazareth. The club currently plays in Liga Gimel Jezreel division.

== History ==
The club was founded on 25 March 1964 Nazareth by George kharma as a vehicle for Catholic action. Under the guidance of Kharma, who also served as team manager and coach throughout the club's existence, the team joined the Israel football association in 1965–66 and played in Liga Gimel under the name "The Catholic Action Club". At the end of the season the club joined the Beitar organization and took the name Beitar al-Amal Nazareth. The team played mainly in the bottom divisions, and was promoted twice to Liga Bet, in 1979 and 1982, only managing a single season in Liga Bet in each season.

== Honours ==
=== League ===
| Honour | No. | Years |
|---|---|---|
| Fifth tier | 2 | 1978–79, 1981–82 |
