= Hapoel Aliyah Kfar Saba F.C. =

Israeli football club

Hapoel Aliyah Kfar Saba
- Full name: Hapoel Aliyah Kfar Saba Football Club הפועל עליה כפר סבא
- Founded: 1971
- Dissolved: 2015
- Ground: Aliyah Kfar Saba Ground, Kfar Saba
- Capacity: 500
- Owner: Ori Sherf
- Chairman: Avraham Aloni
- League: Liga Gimel Sharon
- 2014–15: 7th
Home colours	Away colours

Hapoel Aliyah Kfar Saba (Hebrew: הפועל עליה כפר סבא) was an Israeli football club based in the Aliyah neighbourhood of Kfar Saba. The club played in Liga Gimel Sharon division in 2014/15, and after this season the club dissolved.

== History ==
The club was founded in 1971 and started at Liga Dalet, then the fifth and lowest tier of Israeli football, and were promoted to Liga Gimel in their first season of existence. In the 1973–74 season, the club won their regional division of Liga Gimel and qualified for the Promotion/relegation play-offs, where they achieved a perfect record of 5 wins in 5 matches and were promoted to Liga Bet, the third tier at the time (until 1976). Aliyah finally managed to achieve promotion to Liga Alef (now the third tier) in the 1984–85 season, after they won Liga Bet North B division. In the following season, Aliyah topped Liga Alef North division table until the 8th match and were considered a likely candidates for promotion to Liga Artzit. However, after several defeats and drop in form, the club finished the league in the sixth place. Aliyah were relegated back to Liga Bet in the following season, after second bottom finish.

In the 2001–02 season, Aliyah finished bottom in Liga Bet South B division, and were relegated to Liga Gimel, where they played last time.

The team dissolved in 2015. The last coach was Oran Moharer.

== Honours ==
=== League ===
Honour	No.	Years
Fourth tier	2	1973–74, 1984–85
Fifth tier	1	1971–72
