= Ironi Beit Dagan F.C. =

Israeli football club

Ironi Beit Dagan
- Full name: Ironi Beit Dagan Football Club עירוני בית דגן
- Nickname: HaKabayim (The Firefighters)
- Founded: 1999
- Ground: Beit Dagan Ground, Beit Dagan
- Chairman: Arie Cohen
- Manager: Shuki Sedis
- League: Liga Bet South A
- 2024–25: Liga Bet South A, 14th
Home colours	Away colours

Ironi Beit Dagan (Hebrew: עירוני בית דגן) is an Israeli football club based in Beit Dagan. The club is currently in Liga Bet South A division. The club is part of Maccabi faction.

The club nickname is HaKabayim (The Firefighters), since most of their players are employed as firefighters.

== History ==
The club was founded in 1999 and succeeded the previous club of the local council, Beitar Beit Dagan, which was founded in 1954, and in its prime reached Liga Bet, then the third tier of the Israeli football league system, in the double season of 1966–68. Both clubs played most of their football seasons in Liga Gimel, now the fifth tier of Israeli football.

In the 2013–14 season, the club have won the Israel State Cup for Liga Gimel Tel Aviv division, following a victory of 7–1 against Beitar Ezra.

In the 2014–15 season, the club finished on top of Liga Gimel Tel Aviv division, level on points with Hapoel Neve Golan, which they faced in a decisive promotion play-off. Beit Dagan won 3–2 and were promoted to Liga Bet.

== Honours ==
=== League ===
Honour	No.	Years
Fourth tier	1	1965–66^{1}
Fifth tier	2	1981–82^{1}, 2014–15

^{1} As Beitar Beit Dagan
