= Agudat Sport Holon F.C. =

Israeli football club

A.S. Holon
- Full name: Agudat Sport Holon אגודת ספורט חולון מור
- Nickname: Lazarus
- Founded: 1971 as Agudat Sport Lazarus Holon; 1980 as Maccabi Lazarus Holon; 2001 as Agudat Sport Holon
- Ground: Municipal Stadium, Holon
- Capacity: 3,500
- Chairman: Ya'akov Cohen
- Manager: Yossi Gordana
- League: Liga Gimel
- 2023–24: Liga Gimel Tel Aviv, 10th
Home colours	Away colours

Agudat Sport Holon (Hebrew: אגודת ספורט חולון), A.S. Holon, lit. Holon Sports Association (or in short Hebrew: א.ס. חולון Aleph Samekh Holon, lit. A.S. Holon) is an Israeli football club which representing Jesse Cohen neighborhood in Holon. The club currently plays in Liga Bet South A division.

== History ==
The club was founded in 1971 as Agudat Sport Lazarus Holon. The club started a progress after they won Liga Gimel Dan division in the 1976–77 season and finished runners-up in Liga Bet South A division in the 1977–78 season. Thus, they achieved two successive promotions and reached Liga Alef, the third tier of Israeli football. In 1980, the club changed their name to Maccabi Lazarus Holon and became the new Maccabi club of the city, after the club which was known as Maccabi Holon folded during the summer. In the 1981–82 season, the club was suspended from the league and demoted to Liga Bet, due to riot in their eighteenth match against Hapoel Holon, which abandoned in the 44th minute. The club made an immediate return to Liga Alef, after they won Liga Bet South B division in 1982–83. During that season, while playing in Liga Bet, the club made a big upset in the Israel State Cup, after they eliminated the Israeli reigning champions at the time, Hapoel Kfar Saba by a result of 2–0.

Upon their return to Liga Alef, Maccabi Lazarus Holon played seventeen consecutive seasons in Liga Alef South division, until they folded after the 1999–2000 season. The closest they came to promotion to the second tier (which was Liga Artzit at the time) was at the 1984–85 season, when they finished runners-up and qualified for the Promotion play-offs, where they lost to the North division runners-up, Hapoel Acre and remained in Liga Alef.

In 2001, a successor club, Agudat Sport Holon, which are still commonly known and referred as 'Lazarus', was founded and started at Liga Gimel Tel Aviv division. The club won Liga Gimel Tel Aviv division in the 2004–05 season and promoted to Liga Bet. However, they were relegated back to Liga Gimel in the following season, after they finished bottom in Liga Bet South A division with only one win out of thirty matches. In the 2013–14 season The club finished runners-up in Liga Gimel Tel Aviv division and were promoted to Liga Bet as the second best South runners-up, after two spots were vacated in that league, following the closures of Ironi Bat Yam (played in Liga Alef) and Maccabi Be'er Ya'akov.

== Honours ==
=== League ===
Honour	No.	Years
Fourth tier	1	1982–83^{1}
Fifth tier	1	1976–77^{2}
Sixth tier	1	2004–05

^{1}As Maccabi Lazarus Holon
^{2}As A.S. Lazarus Holon
