= Maccabi HaSharon Netanya F.C. =

Israeli football club

Maccabi HaSharon Netanya
- Full name: Maccabi HaSharon Netanya Football Club מועדון כדורגל מכבי השרון נתניה
- Founded: 1951
- Ground: Shapira, Netanya
- Chairman: ארז איסקוב
- Manager: Shlomi Dahan
- League: Liga Gimel Sharon
- 2015–16: 6th
Home colours	Away colours

Maccabi HaSharon Netanya Football Club (Hebrew: מועדון כדורגל מכבי השרון נתניה) is an Israeli football club based in Netanya.

== History ==
The club was founded as Maccabi Beit Lid in 1951 by Victor Atiyah, and in 1962 was renamed Maccabi HaSharon Netanya.

The club reached Liga Bet, the third tier of Israeli football at the time (the fourth since 1976), in the 1970–71 season and spent the decade playing at the North B division, until relegation to Liga Gimel in the 1979–80 season. Although the club made an immediate return to Liga Bet, they were relegated again in 1981–82 and did not return to Liga Bet until 2008–09, after winning Liga Gimel Sharon division in the previous season.

The club currently plays in Liga Gimel Sharon division, after being relegated from Liga Bet South A in the 2013–14 season.

== Honours ==
- Liga Gimel Sharon (1):
  - 1969–70
  - 1980–81
  - 2007–08
