= 1973–74 Liga Bet =

Israeli football season

The 1973–74 Liga Bet season saw Hapoel Beit She'an, Maccabi Hadera, Beitar Jaffa and Hapoel Ashkelon win their regional divisions and qualify with the second-placed clubs, Beitar Tiberias, Hapoel Mahane Yehuda, Hapoel Kfar Shalem and Maccabi Yavne for promotion play-offs against the bottom two clubs of both North and South divisions in Liga Alef. Maccabi Hadera and Beitar Jaffa were the only Liga Bet clubs who achieved promotion to Liga Alef.

On same basis, promotion-relegation play-offs contested between the bottom Liga Bet clubs and the top Liga Gimel clubs.

== North Division A ==
Pos	Team	Pld	W	D	L	GF	GA	GD	Pts	Qualification
1	Hapoel Beit She'an	30	–	–	–	74	30	+44	47	Promotion play-offs
2	Beitar Tiberias	30	–	–	–	67	40	+27	43	Promotion play-offs
3	Hapoel Kiryat Haim	30	–	–	–	46	35	+11	39	
4	Hapoel Kiryat Yam	30	–	–	–	59	36	+23	38	
5	Hapoel Tel Hanan	30	–	–	–	42	22	+20	38	
6	Hapoel Nazareth Illit (Note: Hapoel Kiryat Nazareth became Hapoel Nazareth Illit, following the city establishment.)	30	–	–	–	66	41	+25	37	
7	Beitar Nahariya	29	–	–	–	44	26	+18	37	
8	Maccabi Kiryat Bialik	30	–	–	–	50	55	−5	29	
9	Hapoel Kfar Ruppin	30	–	–	–	59	62	−3	28	
10	Beitar Kiryat Shmona	30	–	–	–	48	52	−4	28	
11	Hapoel Afikim	30	–	–	–	62	65	−3	26	
12	Hapoel Hatzor	30	–	–	–	31	59	−28	20	
13	Maccabi Tiberias	30	–	–	–	36	59	−23	19	
14	Hapoel Kiryat Tiv'on	30	–	–	–	45	75	−30	19	
15	Hapoel Bnei Acre	29	–	–	–	30	58	−28	17	Relegation play-offs
16	Beitar Acre	30	–	–	–	15	75	−60	9	Relegation play-offs

== North Division B ==
Pos	Team	Pld	W	D	L	GF	GA	GD	Pts	Qualification
1	Maccabi Hadera	30	–	–	–	107	12	+95	54	Promotion play-offs
2	Hapoel Mahane Yehuda	30	–	–	–	100	23	+77	54	Promotion play-offs
3	Hapoel Givat Olga	30	–	–	–	58	27	+31	38	
4	Hapoel Afula	30	–	–	–	66	43	+23	36	
5	Beitar Dov Netanya	30	–	–	–	49	34	+15	36	
6	Hapoel Ra'anana	30	–	–	–	82	49	+33	35	
7	Hapoel Givat Haim	30	–	–	–	68	53	+15	31	
8	Maccabi Pardes Hanna	30	–	–	–	58	50	+8	30	
9	Hapoel Tayibe	30	–	–	–	35	55	−20	29	
10	Maccabi Zikhron Ya'akov	30	–	–	–	45	63	−18	26	
11	Hapoel Geva HaCarmel	30	–	–	–	52	68	−16	23	
12	Beitar Binyamina	30	–	–	–	40	60	−20	23	
13	Maccabi HaSharon Netanya	30	–	–	–	33	50	−17	22	
14	Hapoel Beit Eliezer	30	–	–	–	31	57	−26	22	
15	Hapoel Binyamina	30	–	–	–	26	56	−30	20	Relegation play-offs
16	Hapoel Zikhron Ya'akov	30	–	–	–	13	163	−150	1	Relegation play-offs

== South Division A ==
Pos	Team	Pld	W	D	L	GF	GA	GD	Pts	Qualification or relegation
1	Beitar Jaffa	30	–	–	–	60	27	+33	48	Promotion play-offs
2	Hapoel Kfar Shalem	30	–	–	–	60	19	+41	45	Promotion play-offs
3	Hapoel Or Yehuda	30	–	–	–	38	23	+15	40	
4	Hapoel Rosh HaAyin	30	–	–	–	41	25	+16	35	
5	Maccabi HaShikma Ramat Gan	30	–	–	–	44	30	+14	34	
6	Beitar Holon	30	–	–	–	45	33	+12	32	
7	Hapoel Kafr Qasim	30	–	–	–	37	37	0	31	
8	Beitar Lod	30	–	–	–	45	40	+5	28	
9	Hapoel Kiryat Ono	30	–	–	–	49	50	−1	27	
10	Beitar Bat Yam	30	–	–	–	30	38	−8	26	
11	Beitar Ramat Gan	30	–	–	–	43	58	−15	26	
12	Hapoel Giv'atayim	30	–	–	–	40	39	+1	25	
13	Beitar Herzliya	30	–	–	–	37	50	−13	24	
14	Maccabi Yehud	30	–	–	–	36	54	−18	23	
15	Hapoel HaTzafon Tel Aviv	30	–	–	–	33	54	−21	22	Relegation play-offs
16	Hapoel Ramat HaSharon	30	–	–	–	17	73	−56	10	Relegation play-offs

== South Division B ==
Pos	Team	Pld	W	D	L	GF	GA	GD	Pts	Qualification
1	Hapoel Ashkelon	30	–	–	–	66	16	+50	50	Promotion play-offs
2	Maccabi Yavne	30	–	–	–	47	18	+29	47	Promotion play-offs
3	Hapoel Eilat	30	–	–	–	49	28	+21	39	
4	Beitar Be'er Sheva	30	–	–	–	53	20	+33	38	
5	Hapoel Ofakim	30	–	–	–	57	40	+17	35	
6	Hapoel Kiryat Gat	30	–	–	–	39	33	+6	34	
7	Hapoel Merhavim	30	–	–	–	35	35	0	28	
8	Hapoel Shikun HaMizrah	30	–	–	–	34	40	−6	28	
9	Hapoel Yeruham	30	–	–	–	35	57	−22	28	
10	Beitar Ashdod	30	–	–	–	45	46	−1	27	
11	Maccabi Be'er Sheva	30	–	–	–	35	45	−10	27	
12	Maccabi Jerusalem	30	–	–	–	35	49	−14	25	
13	Maccabi Ramla	30	–	–	–	27	42	−15	24	
14	Hapoel Kiryat Malakhi	30	–	–	–	24	44	−20	22	
15	Maccabi Rehovot	30	–	–	–	37	52	−15	20	Relegation play-offs
16	HaBira Jerusalem	30	–	–	–	9	59	−50	6	Relegation play-offs

== Promotion play-offs ==
=== North play-offs ===
Pos	Team	Pld	W	D	L	GF	GA	GD	Pts	Promotion or relegation
1	Maccabi Hadera	4	3	1	0	13	3	+10	7	Promoted to Liga Alef
2	Maccabi Herzliya	4	2	2	0	4	2	+2	6	Remained in Liga Alef
3	Hapoel Mahane Yehuda	4	2	0	2	5	3	+2	4	Remained in Liga Bet
4	Hapoel Beit She'an	4	1	0	3	2	7	−5	2	Remained in Liga Bet
5	Hapoel Migdal HaEmek	4	0	1	3	3	12	−9	1	Relegated to Liga Bet

Beitar Tiberias suspended from the play-offs due to crowd trouble against Hapoel Beit She'an.

=== South play-offs ===
Pos	Team	Pld	W	D	L	GF	GA	GD	Pts	Promotion or relegation
1	Beitar Jaffa	5	3	2	0	6	2	+4	8	Promoted to Liga Alef
2	Hapoel Ramla	5	3	1	1	6	4	+2	7	Remained in Liga Alef
3	Hapoel Ashkelon	5	2	2	1	5	2	+3	6	Remained in Liga Bet
4	Hapoel Kfar Shalem	5	2	1	2	6	5	+1	5	Remained in Liga Bet
5	Maccabi Yavne	5	1	2	2	1	3	−2	4	Remained in Liga Bet
6	Maccabi Holon	5	0	0	5	1	9	−8	0	Relegated to Liga Bet

== Relegation play-offs ==
=== North A play-offs ===
Pos	Team	Pld	W	D	L	GF	GA	GD	Pts	Promotion or relegation
1	Maccabi Hatzor	4	2	2	0	10	3	+7	6	Promoted to Liga Bet
2	Hapoel Majd al-Krum	4	1	3	0	5	2	+3	5	Promoted to Liga Bet
3	Hapoel Bnei Acre	3	1	1	1	4	3	+1	3 (Note: Hapoel Bnei Acre - Hapoel Ein Harod interrupted after 70 minutes.)	Relegated to Liga Gimel
4	Hapoel Ein Harod	3	1	1	1	5	5	0	3	Remained in Liga Gimel
5	Beitar Tel Hanan	4	0	1	3	3	14	−11	1	Remained in Liga Gimel

Notes:

Beitar Acre withdrew from the play-offs and relegated to Liga Gimel.

=== North B play-offs ===
Pos	Team	Pld	W	D	L	GF	GA	GD	Pts	Promotion or relegation
1	Maccabi Ahi Nazareth	5	4	1	0	8	2	+6	9	Promoted to Liga Bet
2	Hapoel Binyamina	5	3	1	1	13	7	+6	7	Remained in Liga Bet
3	Beitar Givat Olga	5	3	0	2	8	6	+2	6	Remained in Liga Gimel
4	Maccabi Tzofei Haifa	5	2	0	3	7	9	−2	4	Remained in Liga Gimel
5	Hapoel Zikhron Ya'akov	5	1	1	3	6	10	−4	3	Relegated to Liga Gimel
6	Hapoel Yokneam	5	0	1	4	5	13	−8	1	Remained in Liga Gimel

=== South A play-offs ===
Pos	Team	Pld	W	D	L	GF	GA	GD	Pts	Promotion or relegation
1	Hapoel Aliyah Kfar Saba	5	5	0	0	17	6	+11	10	Promoted to Liga Bet
2	Hapoel HaTzafon Tel Aviv	5	4	0	1	13	4	+9	8	Remained in Liga Bet
3	Maccabi Bat Yam	5	2	1	2	6	9	−3	5	Remained in Liga Gimel
4	Hapoel Ganei Tikva	5	2	0	3	11	11	0	4	Remained in Liga Gimel
5	Hapoel Ramat HaSharon	5	1	0	4	6	13	−7	2	Relegated to Liga Gimel
6	Hapoel Ihud Tzeirei Jaffa	5	0	1	4	9	19	−10	1	Remained in Liga Gimel

=== South B play-offs ===
Pos	Team	Pld	W	D	L	GF	GA	GD	Pts	Promotion or relegation
1	Maccabi Kiryat Gat	5	3	2	0	11	2	+9	8	Promoted to Liga Bet
2	Beitar Ashkelon	5	4	0	1	8	4	+4	8	Promoted to Liga Bet
3	Maccabi Ashkelon	5	3	1	1	11	4	+7	7	Remained in Liga Gimel
4	Tzafririm Holon	5	1	2	2	5	8	−3	4	Remained in Liga Gimel
5	HaBira Jerusalem	5	1	1	3	8	9	−1	3	Relegated to Liga Gimel
6	Maccabi Rehovot	5	0	0	5	3	19	−16	0	Relegated to Liga Gimel
