= 2002–03 Liga Bet =

Israeli football season

The 2002–03 Liga Bet season saw Hapoel Makr, Hapoel Reineh, F.C. Kafr Qasim and Beitar Giv'at Ze'ev win their regional divisions and promoted to Liga Alef.

At the bottom, Maccabi Bnei Yarka, Hapoel Kisra (from North A division), Hapoel Nahliel (from North B division), Shimshon Bnei Tayibe (from South A division), Hapoel Rahat and Hapoel Sde Uzziah (from South B division) were all automatically relegated to Liga Gimel.

== North A Division ==
Pos	Team	Pld	W	D	L	GF	GA	GD	Pts	Promotion or relegation
1	Hapoel Makr	30	22	5	3	74	28	+46	71	Promoted to Liga Alef
2	Tzeirei Nahf	30	20	8	2	69	25	+44	68	
3	Hapoel Peki'in	30	18	6	6	55	29	+26	60	
4	Hapoel Arraba	30	14	8	8	50	42	+8	50	
5	Ironi Nahariya	30	14	7	9	71	48	+23	49	
6	Maccabi Sektzia Ma'alot	30	14	7	9	62	43	+19	49	
7	Bnei Abu Snan	30	14	6	10	60	46	+14	46 (Note: Two points deducted)	
8	Hapoel Bnei Jadeidi	30	12	1	17	47	48	−1	37	
9	Hapoel Karmiel	30	10	3	17	28	55	−27	33	
10	Hapoel Yanuh	30	9	6	15	42	50	−8	33	
11	Hapoel Bnei Manda	30	8	7	15	35	57	−22	31	
12	Hapoel Deir Hanna	30	9	3	18	32	51	−19	30	
13	Beitar Haifa	30	8	6	16	44	63	−19	30	
14	Maccabi Bnei Yarka	30	6	12	12	27	42	−15	30	Relegated to Liga Gimel
15	Hapoel Kisra	30	8	4	18	40	83	−43	28	Relegated to Liga Gimel
16	Hapoel Sakhnin	30	8	3	19	39	65	−26	27	Reprieved from relegation

== North B Division ==
Pos	Team	Pld	W	D	L	GF	GA	GD	Pts	Promotion or relegation
1	Hapoel Reineh	30	24	5	1	70	15	+55	77	Promoted to Liga Alef
2	Hapoel Afula	30	21	5	4	80	23	+57	68	
3	Hapoel Umm al-Fahm	30	19	8	3	63	19	+44	65	
4	Hapoel Daliyat al-Karmel	30	19	7	4	58	26	+32	64	
5	Hapoel Iksal	30	14	8	8	65	37	+28	50	
6	Hapoel Ahva Haifa	30	14	6	10	59	57	+2	48	
7	Hapoel Mo'atza Ezorit Galil Tahton	30	11	7	12	38	43	−5	40	
8	Maccabi Isfiya	30	11	4	15	45	49	−4	37	Withdrew
9	Hapoel Emek Tamra	30	10	6	14	37	56	−19	36	Withdrew
10	Hapoel Bir al-Maksur	30	10	4	16	39	53	−14	34	
11	Hapoel Yafa	30	9	5	16	49	75	−26	32	
12	Hapoel Tel Hanan	30	9	5	16	44	70	−26	32	
13	Ironi Sayid Umm al-Fahm	30	8	7	15	38	43	−5	31	
14	Maccabi Kafr Qara	30	8	7	15	36	46	−10	31	
15	Hapoel Bnei Nazareth	30	5	7	18	37	68	−31	22	
16	Hapoel Nahliel	30	2	1	27	16	94	−78	7	Relegated to Liga Gimel

== South A Division ==
Pos	Team	Pld	W	D	L	GF	GA	GD	Pts	Promotion or relegation
1	F.C. Kafr Qasim	30	18	6	6	64	39	+25	60	Promoted to Liga Alef
2	Hapoel Hod HaSharon	30	17	9	4	67	33	+34	60	
3	Hapoel Kiryat Ono	30	16	8	6	53	27	+26	56	
4	Hapoel Azor	30	16	7	7	65	37	+28	55	
5	Hapoel Mahane Yehuda	30	14	6	10	54	42	+12	48	
6	Otzma Holon	30	13	7	10	59	54	+5	46	
7	Maccabi Holon Bat Yam	30	13	7	10	43	40	+3	46	
8	Maccabi Montefiore	30	13	5	12	66	48	+18	44	
9	Beitar Ramat Gan	30	12	5	13	40	44	−4	41	
10	Hapoel Qalansawe	30	11	8	11	53	51	+2	41	
11	M.M. Giv'at Shmuel	30	10	6	14	43	53	−10	36	
12	Beitar Jaffa	30	9	9	12	42	67	−25	36	
13	Hapoel Ar'ara	30	8	8	14	42	53	−11	32	
14	Maccabi Kfar Yona	30	7	7	16	33	56	−23	28	
15	Maccabi Yehud	30	6	9	15	36	46	−10	27	
16	Shimshon Bnei Tayibe	30	2	3	25	17	87	−70	9	Relegated to Liga Gimel

== South B Division ==
Pos	Team	Pld	W	D	L	GF	GA	GD	Pts	Promotion or relegation
1	Beitar Giv'at Ze'ev	30	21	6	3	84	17	+67	69	Promoted to Liga Alef
2	Hapoel Arad	30	21	5	4	67	14	+53	68	
3	Hapoel Masos/Segev Shalom	30	20	5	5	77	25	+52	65	
4	Hapoel Namal Ashdod	30	14	9	7	58	36	+22	51	
5	Hapoel Bnei Lod	30	14	5	11	47	47	0	47	
6	Hapoel Bnei Lakhish	30	12	11	7	41	26	+15	47	
7	Hapoel Yeruham	30	12	7	11	58	35	+23	43	
8	Hapoel Merhavim	30	12	7	11	43	43	0	43	
9	A.S. Eilat	30	13	4	13	65	54	+11	41 (Note: Two point deducted)	
10	Maccabi Ben Zvi	30	11	6	13	55	54	+1	39	
11	Maccabi Kiryat Ekron	30	11	3	16	51	76	−25	36	
12	Hapoel Oranit	30	10	6	14	50	66	−16	36	
13	Maccabi Jerusalem/Ma'ale Adumim	30	9	8	13	57	57	0	35	
14	Ironi Ramla	30	9	7	14	35	58	−23	34	
15	Hapoel Rahat	30	2	5	23	35	120	−85	11	Relegated to Liga Gimel
16	Hapoel Sde Uzziah	30	1	2	27	19	114	−95	5	Relegated to Liga Gimel
