= 1978–79 Israel State Cup =

Tournament details
- Country: Israel

Final positions
- Champions: Beitar Jerusalem (2nd Title)
- Runners-up: Maccabi Tel Aviv

The 1978–79 Israel State Cup (Hebrew: גביע המדינה, Gvia HaMedina) was the 40th season of Israel's nationwide football cup competition and the 25th after the Israeli Declaration of Independence.

The competition was won by Beitar Jerusalem who have beaten Maccabi Tel Aviv 2–1 at the final.

== Results ==
=== Fifth round ===
| Home team | Score | Away team |
|---|---|---|
| Hapoel Yeruham | 1–1 (a.e.t.) 2–4 p. | Hapoel Safed |
| Beitar Ramla | 3–0 | Hapoel Kiryat Ono |
| Hapoel Kiryat Ata | 3–2 | Hapoel Kfar Kama |
| Hapoel Ashkelon | 5–1 | Hapoel Dimona |
| Hapoel Beit Shemesh | 1–0 (a.e.t.) | Lazarus Holon |
| Beitar Kiryat Shmona | w/o | Hapoel Aliyah Kfar Saba |
| Beitar Bat Yam | 0–1 (a.e.t.) | Hapoel Sakhnin |
| Maccabi Karmiel | 1–2 (a.e.t.) | Hapoel Umm al-Fahm |
| Hapoel Herzliya | 1–1 (a.e.t.) 4–2 p. | Maccabi Fureidis |
| Maccabi Yavne | 2–1 (a.e.t.) | Hapoel Ramla |
| Maccabi Be'er Sheva | 3–3 (a.e.t.) 3–2 p. | Hapoel Ra'anana |
| Beitar al-Amal Nazareth | 0–3 | Beitar Netanya |
| Maccabi Ahi Nazareth | 3–1 | Maccabi HaShikma Ramat Gan |
| Hapoel Kiryat Shalom | 3–1 | Maccabi Tiberias |
| Maccabi Shefa-'Amr | 0–4 | Maccabi Sha'arayim |
| Beitar Ashdod | w/o | Hapoel Givat Haim |

=== Sixth Round ===
| Home team | Score | Away team |
|---|---|---|
| Hapoel Ashkelon | 2–2 (a.e.t.) 3–2 p. | Hapoel Bat Yam |
| Hapoel Marmorek | 2–0 | Maccabi Ramat Amidar |
| Hapoel Beit She'an | 0–2 | Hapoel Ramat Gan |
| Hapoel Givat Haim | 1–3 | Hapoel Beit Shemesh |
| Hapoel Acre | 3-0 | Hapoel Holon |
| Hapoel Tirat HaCarmel | 1–1 (a.e.t.) 3–2 p. | Hapoel Lod |
| Hapoel Safed | 1–2 | Hapoel Petah Tikva |
| Hapoel Netanya | 2–0 | Hapoel Umm al-Fahm |
| Beitar Netanya | 2–0 | Hapoel Herzliya |
| Hapoel Tiberias | 0–3 | Hakoah Maccabi Ramat Gan |
| Hapoel Kiryat Shalom | 1–2 | Maccabi Haifa |
| Maccabi Be'er Sheva | 4–3 | Maccabi Herzliya |
| Maccabi Yavne | 1–0 | Maccabi Ahi Nazareth |
| Hapoel Ashdod | 1–0 (a.e.t.) | Hapoel Kiryat Ata |
| Maccabi Sha'arayim | w/o | Hapoel Sakhnin |
| Beitar Ramla | 4–0 | Hapoel Aliyah Kfar Saba |

=== Seventh Round ===
| Home team | Score | Away team |
|---|---|---|
| Hakoah Maccabi Ramat Gan | 0–1 | Beitar Jerusalem |
| Maccabi Tel Aviv | 3–0 | Beitar Netanya |
| Maccabi Sha'arayim | 0–3 | Hapoel Haifa |
| Hapoel Tel Aviv | 1–0 | Hapoel Tirat HaCarmel |
| Maccabi Jaffa | 1–0 | Beitar Ramla |
| Hapoel Petah Tikva | 2–0 | Shimshon Tel Aviv |
| Hapoel Rishon LeZion | 4–0 | Hapoel Ashdod |
| Hapoel Ashkelon | 1–1 (a.e.t.) 6–7 p. | Bnei Yehuda |
| Hapoel Ramat Gan | 1–1 (a.e.t.) 3–4 p. | Maccabi Petah Tikva |
| Hapoel Be'er Sheva | 4–0 | Hapoel Beit Shemesh |
| Hapoel Netanya | 0–2 | Beitar Tel Aviv |
| Hapoel Hadera | 1–0 | Hapoel Marmorek |
| Maccabi Netanya | 3–1 | Maccabi Be'er Sheva |
| Maccabi Haifa | 2–1 | Hapoel Jerusalem |
| Hapoel Acre | 2–0 | Hapoel Yehud |
| Hapoel Kfar Saba | 2–1 (a.e.t.) | Maccabi Yavne |

=== Round of 16 ===
| Home team | Score | Away team |
|---|---|---|
| Hapoel Petah Tikva | 0–1 | Beitar Jerusalem |
| Bnei Yehuda | 2–0 | Hapoel Rishon LeZion |
| Hapoel Hadera | 0–0 (a.e.t.) 4–2 p. | Hapoel Tel Aviv |
| Maccabi Petah Tikva | 2–1 | Hapoel Haifa |
| Hapoel Acre | 0–1 | Beitar Tel Aviv |
| Maccabi Tel Aviv | 2–1 | Maccabi Netanya |
| Hapoel Kfar Saba | 1–2 | Hapoel Be'er Sheva |
| Maccabi Jaffa | 1–0 | Maccabi Haifa |

=== Quarter-finals ===
| Home team | Score | Away team |
|---|---|---|
| Beitar Tel Aviv | 0–0 (a.e.t.) 3–0 p. | Hapoel Be'er Sheva |
| Maccabi Petah Tikva | 0–3 | Beitar Jerusalem |
| Hapoel Hadera | 0–0 (a.e.t.) 2–4 p. | Bnei Yehuda |
| Maccabi Jaffa | 0–1 | Maccabi Tel Aviv |

=== Semi-finals ===
| Home team | Score | Away team |
|---|---|---|
| Maccabi Tel Aviv | 3–0 | Beitar Tel Aviv |
| Beitar Jerusalem | 2–1 | Bnei Yehuda |

=== Final ===
6 June 1979

| Maccabi Tel Aviv | 1–2 | Beitar Jerusalem |
|---|---|---|
| Peretz 83' | | Neuman 21'; Avrahami 81' |

Ramat Gan Stadium
Attendance: 35000
Referee: Ashkenazi
