= 1972–73 Liga Bet =

Israeli football season

The 1972–73 Liga Bet season saw Hapoel Kiryat Ata, Hapoel Netanya, Maccabi Holon and SK Nes Tziona win their regional divisions and promoted to Liga Alef.

== North Division A ==
Pos	Team	Pld	W	D	L	GF	GA	GD	Pts	Promotion or relegation
1	Hapoel Kiryat Ata	30	–	–	–	75	14	+61	55	Promoted to Liga Alef
2	Hapoel Beit She'an	30	–	–	–	76	30	+46	48	
3	Hapoel Kiryat Nazareth	30	–	–	–	52	42	+10	36	
4	Hapoel Tel Hanan	30	–	–	–	46	34	+12	35	
5	Hapoel Kfar Ruppin	30	–	–	–	63	45	+18	32	
6	Hapoel Kiryat Yam	30	–	–	–	72	55	+17	32	
7	Beitar Tiberias	30	–	–	–	48	40	+8	32	
8	Hapoel Hatzor	30	–	–	–	36	46	−10	29 (Note: 2 points deducted.)	
9	Beitar Kiryat Shmona	30	–	–	–	42	43	−1	28	
10	Hapoel Kiryat Haim	30	–	–	–	49	50	−1	26	
11	Beitar Acre	30	–	–	–	38	46	−8	25	
12	Maccabi Kiryat Bialik	30	–	–	–	45	56	−11	25	
13	Hapoel Afikim	29	–	–	–	50	56	−6	23	
14	Hapoel Bnei Acre	30	–	–	–	46	63	−17	23	
15	Beitar Hatzor	29	–	–	–	35	78	−43	17	Relegated to Liga Gimel
16	Beitar Tel Hanan	30	–	–	–	25	100	−75	10	Relegated to Liga Gimel

== North Division B ==
Pos	Team	Pld	W	D	L	GF	GA	GD	Pts	Promotion or relegation
1	Hapoel Netanya	30	–	–	–	104	26	+78	51	Promoted to Liga Alef
2	Maccabi Hadera	30	–	–	–	73	26	+47	48	
3	Beitar Dov Netanya	30	–	–	–	53	28	+25	40	
4	Hapoel Ra'anana	30	–	–	–	49	37	+12	35	
5	Hapoel Afula	30	–	–	–	53	40	+13	34	
6	Maccabi Pardes Hanna	30	–	–	–	48	45	+3	31	
7	Hapoel Geva HaCarmel	30	–	–	–	55	57	−2	28	
8	Hapoel Givat Olga	30	–	–	–	40	46	−6	28	
9	Maccabi Zikhron Ya'akov	30	–	–	–	43	57	−14	27	
10	Beitar Binyamina	30	–	–	–	34	55	−21	25	
11	Hapoel Zikhron Ya'akov	30	–	–	–	31	49	−18	24	
12	Hapoel Beit Eliezer	30	–	–	–	27	53	−26	24	
13	Maccabi HaSharon Netanya	30	–	–	–	41	56	−15	23	
14	Hapoel Binyamina	30	–	–	–	31	56	−25	21	
15	Hapoel Ahva Haifa	30	–	–	–	43	73	−30	20	Relegated to Liga Gimel
16	M.S. Even Yehuda	30	–	–	–	38	59	−21	19	Relegated to Liga Gimel

== South Division A ==
Pos	Team	Pld	W	D	L	GF	GA	GD	Pts	Promotion or relegation
1	Maccabi Holon	30	–	–	–	41	25	+16	41	Promoted to Liga Alef
2	Hapoel Rosh HaAyin	30	–	–	–	51	29	+22	38	
3	Hapoel Kfar Shalem	30	–	–	–	49	37	+12	35	
4	Beitar Ramat Gan	30	–	–	–	55	41	+14	34	
5	Hapoel Kafr Qasim	30	–	–	–	32	26	+6	34	
6	Beitar Lod	30	–	–	–	43	48	−5	32	
7	Hapoel HaTzafon Tel Aviv	29	–	–	–	45	30	+15	31	
8	Maccabi HaShikma Ramat Gan	30	–	–	–	48	44	+4	31	
9	Beitar Holon	30	–	–	–	35	42	−7	28	
10	Beitar Jaffa	30	–	–	–	40	47	−7	27	
11	Hapoel Ramat HaSharon	30	–	–	–	35	45	−10	26	
12	Hapoel Or Yehuda	29	–	–	–	38	50	−12	26	
13	Hapoel Giv'atayim	30	–	–	–	37	39	−2	25	
14	Beitar Bat Yam	30	–	–	–	31	42	−11	25	
15	Hapoel Ganei Tikva	30	–	–	–	39	50	−11	24	Relegated to Liga Gimel
16	Maccabi Bat Yam	30	–	–	–	38	62	−24	19	Relegated to Liga Gimel

== South Division B ==
Pos	Team	Pld	W	D	L	GF	GA	GD	Pts	Promotion or relegation
1	SK Nes Tziona	30	–	–	–	49	21	+28	43	Promoted to Liga Alef
2	Maccabi Yavne	30	–	–	–	50	25	+25	41	
3	Hapoel Ashkelon	30	–	–	–	46	27	+19	41	
4	Hapoel Merhavim	30	–	–	–	45	34	+11	32	
5	Beitar Be'er Sheva	30	–	–	–	34	28	+6	32	
6	Hapoel Ofakim	30	–	–	–	39	42	−3	31	
7	Maccabi Be'er Sheva	30	–	–	–	42	47	−5	28	
8	Maccabi Ramla	30	–	–	–	41	41	0	27	
9	Hapoel Shikun HaMizrah	30	–	–	–	37	48	−11	27	
10	Maccabi Rehovot	30	–	–	–	38	37	+1	26	
11	HaBira Jerusalem	30	–	–	–	45	52	−7	26	
12	Hapoel Kiryat Malakhi	30	–	–	–	39	47	−8	26	
13	Hapoel Yeruham	30	–	–	–	42	52	−10	26	
14	Beitar Ashdod	30	–	–	–	28	40	−12	26	
15	Beitar Ashkelon	30	–	–	–	38	46	−8	24	Relegated to Liga Gimel
16	Maccabi Kiryat Gat	30	–	–	–	33	59	−26	20	Relegated to Liga Gimel
