= 1980–81 Israel State Cup =

Tournament details
- Country: Israel

Final positions
- Champions: Bnei Yehuda (2nd Title)
- Runners-up: Hapoel Tel Aviv

The 1980–81 Israel State Cup (Hebrew: גביע המדינה, Gvia HaMedina) was the 42nd season of Israel's nationwide football cup competition and the 27th after the Israeli Declaration of Independence.

The competition was won by Bnei Yehuda who have beaten Hapoel Tel Aviv 4–3 in penalty shoot-out, after 2–2 in the final.

== Format Changes ==
Starting with this edition, if a match is drawn, a replay is to be played, drawn replays are to be settled with extra time and penalty shootouts. This does not include the final and the semi-final, which are still to be settled without replays.

== Results ==
=== Fifth Round ===
Home team	Score	Away team
Maccabi Or Akiva	1–2	Maccabi Sha'arayim
Maccabi Be'er Sheva	3–0	Maccabi Ramla
Hapoel Kafr Sulam	3–1	Hapoel Kiryat Ono
Maccabi Hadera	7–1	Maccabi Tur'an
Hapoel Kiryat Ata	0–1	Hapoel Givat Olga
Hapoel Ra'anana	0–1	Maccabi Shikun HaMizrah
Maccabi Tzur Shalom	2–4	Beitar Netanya
Hapoel Ashkelon	1–4	Beitar Haifa
Maccabi Kiryat Gat	1–0 (a.e.t.)	Hapoel Bat Yam
Hapoel Ramla	1–0	Maccabi Kiryat Bialik
Hapoel Dimona	w/o	Hapoel Rosh HaAyin
Bnei Hatzor	w/o	Hapoel Herzliya
Maccabi Shefa-'Amr	5–0	Hapoel Yafa
Maccabi Neve Sha'anan	4–3 (a.e.t.)	Hapoel Merhavim
Hapoel Yeruham	2–1	Beitar Be'er Sheva
Hapoel Sderot	1–1 (a.e.t.) 4–2 p.	Hapoel Netanya

=== Sixth Round ===
Home team	Score	Away team
Beitar Jerusalem	1–0	Maccabi Herzliya
Maccabi Kiryat Gat	4–2 (a.e.t.)	Hapoel Lod
Hapoel Yeruham	3–0	Maccabi Shefa-'Amr
Maccabi Yavne	3–0	Hapoel Kafr Sulam
Hakoah Maccabi Ramat Gan	1–0	Maccabi Shikun HaMizrah
Hapoel Givat Olga	2–2, replay: 1–3	Bnei Hatzor
Beitar Haifa	1–1, replay: 1–3	Hapoel Holon
Maccabi Neve Sha'anan	0–2	Beitar Netanya
Hapoel Sderot	0–0, replay: 0–4	Beitar Tel Aviv
Maccabi Haifa	3–1 (a.e.t.)	Hapoel Tiberias
Hapoel Nazareth Illit	1–0	Beitar Ramla
Maccabi Sha'arayim	0–0, replay: 1–0	Hapoel Dimona
Hapoel Beit Shemesh	2–0	Hapoel Acre
Hapoel Hadera	2–1	Maccabi Hadera
Hapoel Beit She'an	1–3	Hapoel Ramla
Hapoel Kiryat Shmona	1–1, replay: 0–0, 3–4 p.	Maccabi Be'er Sheva

=== Seventh Round ===
Home team	Score	Away team
Maccabi Tel Aviv	2–3	Hapoel Hadera
Hapoel Jerusalem	1–0	Hapoel Holon
Shimshon Tel Aviv	2–1	Beitar Jerusalem
Maccabi Jaffa	3–0	Hapoel Nazareth Illit
Maccabi Haifa	2–0	Hapoel Rishon LeZion
Beitar Netanya	3–0	Hapoel Haifa
Hapoel Tel Aviv	1–0	Hapoel Beit Shemesh
Hapoel Ramla	0–1 (a.e.t.)	Hapoel Petah Tikva
Hapoel Kfar Saba	3–2	Maccabi Kiryat Gat
Maccabi Petah Tikva	1–1, replay: 1–1, 4–5 p.	Beitar Tel Aviv
Hapoel Yehud	6–0	Bnei Hatzor
Hapoel Yeruham	0–0, replay: 0–2	Maccabi Ramat Amidar
Maccabi Sha'arayim	1–2	Bnei Yehuda
Hapoel Be'er Sheva	1–2	Hakoah Maccabi Ramat Gan
Maccabi Netanya	3–1 (a.e.t.)	Maccabi Be'er Sheva
Maccabi Yavne	0–0, replay: 0–0, 1–3 p.	Hapoel Ramat Gan

=== Round of 16 ===
Home team	Score	Away team
Hapoel Tel Aviv	2–0	Maccabi Netanya
Hakoah Maccabi Ramat Gan	1–0	Hapoel Ramat Gan
Beitar Tel Aviv	2–3	Maccabi Haifa
Maccabi Ramat Amidar	1–0	Beitar Netanya
Hapoel Yehud	2–1	Hapoel Kfar Saba
Hapoel Jerusalem	0–0, replay: 0–2	Bnei Yehuda
Hapoel Petah Tikva	1–0	Hapoel Hadera
Shimshon Tel Aviv	1–1, replay: 0–1	Maccabi Jaffa

=== Quarter-finals ===
Home team	Score	Away team
Maccabi Haifa	1–0	Hapoel Yehud
Bnei Yehuda	2–1	Maccabi Jaffa
Hapoel Tel Aviv	3–0	Hakoah Maccabi Ramat Gan
Hapoel Petah Tikva	0–1	Maccabi Ramat Amidar

=== Semi-finals ===
Home team	Score	Away team
Hapoel Tel Aviv	1–0	Maccabi Ramat Amidar
Bnei Yehuda	2–2 (a.e.t.) 5–3 p.	Maccabi Haifa

=== Final ===
27 May 1981

Hapoel Tel Aviv	2–2	Bnei Yehuda
Sinai 54' (pen.); Dreyfus 96'		Malhi 75'; Yechiel 104'
Penalties
	3–4

Ramat Gan Stadium
Attendance: 25000
Referee: Sharir
