= 1979–80 Israel State Cup =

Tournament details
- Country: Israel

Final positions
- Champions: Hapoel Kfar Saba (2nd Title)
- Runners-up: Maccabi Ramat Amidar

The 1979–80 Israel State Cup (Hebrew: גביע המדינה, Gvia HaMedina) was the 41st season of Israel's nationwide football cup competition and the 26th after the Israeli Declaration of Independence.

The competition was won by Hapoel Kfar Saba who have beaten Maccabi Ramat Amidar 4–1 at the final.

== Results ==
=== Fifth round ===
Home team	Score	Away team
Hapoel Makr	1–0	Hapoel Kiryat Shmona
Maccabi Hadera	1–0	Hapoel Dimona
Maccabi Sha'arayim	3–0	Hapoel Ashkelon
Hapoel Tel Hanan	1–1 (a.e.t.) 3–2 p.	Maccabi Shefa-'Amr
Hapoel Yeruham	0–1 (a.e.t.)	Hapoel Marmorek
Hapoel Nahariya	5–3	Hapoel Netanya
Hapoel Nahliel	0–1	Hapoel Ramla
Hapoel Givat Olga	2–3	Hapoel Ashdod
Lazarus Holon	1–2	Maccabi Neve Sha'anan
Hapoel Ra'anana	2–1	Beitar Ramla
Hapoel Kiryat Ata	4–2 (a.e.t.)	Hapoel Or Yehuda
Maccabi Kiryat Gat	2–1	Hapoel Merhavim
Beitar Netanya	1–0	Hapoel Rosh HaAyin
Maccabi Or Akiva	2–1	Hapoel Daliyat al-Karmel
Hapoel Kiryat Malakhi	w/o	Hapoel Kafr Qasim
Hapoel Bnei Nazareth	2–3	Beitar Be'er Sheva

=== Sixth Round ===
Home team	Score	Away team
Maccabi Hadera	0–1	Hapoel Ramla
Hapoel Tiberias	2–1	Hapoel Kiryat Malakhi
Maccabi Kiryat Gat	3–0	Hapoel Tel Hanan
Hapoel Nahariya	2–1	Hapoel Ashdod
Hapoel Beit She'an	0–0 (a.e.t.) 3–0 p.	Maccabi Neve Sha'anan
Maccabi Sha'arayim	1–2	Maccabi Herzliya
Hapoel Makr	1–3	Hapoel Herzliya
Hapoel Acre	0–0 (a.e.t.) 5–4 p.	Hapoel Lod
Hapoel Holon	2–4 (a.e.t.)	Hapoel Beit Shemesh
Hapoel Marmorek	1–0	Beitar Netanya
Hapoel Nazareth Illit	4–2	Hapoel Tirat HaCarmel
Hapoel Ra'anana	0–2 (a.e.t.)	Hapoel Hadera
Hapoel Ramat Gan	2–0	Hapoel Bat Yam
Hapoel Jerusalem	2–0 (a.e.t.)	Hapoel Kiryat Ata
Hapoel Rishon LeZion	4–0	Maccabi Or Akiva
Maccabi Haifa	4–1	Beitar Be'er Sheva

=== Seventh Round ===
Home team	Score	Away team
Hapoel Acre	1–0	Bnei Yehuda
Maccabi Ramat Amidar	4–1	Hapoel Tiberias
Hapoel Tel Aviv	3–1 (a.e.t.)	Hapoel Marmorek
Beitar Jerusalem	3–1	Hapoel Beit Shemesh
Maccabi Petah Tikva	2–0	Hapoel Nahariya
Maccabi Haifa	2–1	Hapoel Be'er Sheva
Hapoel Rishon LeZion	1–2	Hapoel Kfar Saba
Maccabi Tel Aviv	2–0	Hapoel Herzliya
Maccabi Jaffa	0–0 (a.e.t.) 4–3 p.	Maccabi Kiryat Gat
Hapoel Haifa	1–0	Hapoel Ramat Gan
Hapoel Hadera	1–1 (a.e.t.) 3–1 p.	Maccabi Netanya
Hapoel Petah Tikva	0–0 (a.e.t.) 3–2 p.	Hapoel Jerusalem
Hapoel Beit She'an	0–0 (a.e.t.) 3–2 p.	Beitar Tel Aviv
Hapoel Nazareth Illit	1–4	Shimshon Tel Aviv
Hapoel Ramla	0–0 (a.e.t.) 2–3 p.	Hakoah Maccabi Ramat Gan
Maccabi Herzliya	0–0 (a.e.t.) 5–4 p.	Hapoel Yehud

=== Round of 16 ===
Home team	Score	Away team
Beitar Jerusalem	2–1	Hapoel Petah Tikva
Shimshon Tel Aviv	1–0	Hakoah Maccabi Ramat Gan
Maccabi Haifa	2–2 (a.e.t.) 5–3 p.	Maccabi Herzliya
Hapoel Haifa	0–0 (a.e.t.) 1–4 p.	Maccabi Ramat Amidar
Hapoel Kfar Saba	1–0	Hapoel Acre
Maccabi Tel Aviv	2–0	Hapoel Hadera
Hapoel Beit She'an	2–4	Maccabi Petah Tikva
Maccabi Jaffa	1–0	Hapoel Tel Aviv

=== Quarter-finals ===
Home team	Score	Away team
Maccabi Tel Aviv	1–2	Shimshon Tel Aviv
Beitar Jerusalem	0–0 (a.e.t.) 5–4 p.	Maccabi Jaffa
Hapoel Kfar Saba	5–2	Maccabi Petah Tikva
Maccabi Haifa	0–1	Maccabi Ramat Amidar

=== Semi-finals ===
Home team	Score	Away team
Hapoel Kfar Saba	1–0	Shimshon Tel Aviv
Maccabi Ramat Amidar	1–1 (a.e.t.) 4–3 p.	Beitar Jerusalem

=== Final ===
4 June 1980

Hapoel Kfar Saba	4–1	Maccabi Ramat Amidar
Na'aman 12'; Yani 55'; Fogel 63', 68'		Maymon 73' (pen.)

Ramat Gan Stadium
Attendance: 12000
Referee: Klein
