= 1971–72 Liga Bet =

Israeli football season

The 1971–72 Liga Bet season saw Hapoel Safed, Hapoel Givat Haim, Hapoel Ramla and Hapoel Dimona win their regional divisions and promoted to Liga Alef.

== North Division A ==
Pos	Team	Pld	W	D	L	GF	GA	GD	Pts	Promotion or relegation
1	Hapoel Safed	30	–	–	–	58	20	+38	48	Promoted to Liga Alef
2	Hapoel Beit She'an	30	–	–	–	80	38	+42	46	
3	Beitar Tiberias	30	–	–	–	80	42	+38	43	
4	Hapoel Kiryat Ata	30	–	–	–	66	37	+29	38	
5	Beitar Kiryat Shmona	30	–	–	–	59	37	+22	37	
6	Beitar Acre	30	–	–	–	49	44	+5	29	
7	Hapoel Afikim	30	–	–	–	63	61	+2	28	
8	Hapoel Tel Hanan	30	–	–	–	50	57	−7	25	
9	Hapoel Kfar Ruppin	30	–	–	–	33	43	−10	25	
10	Maccabi Kiryat Bialik	30	–	–	–	42	55	−13	25	
11	Hapoel Kiryat Yam	30	–	–	–	32	52	−20	25	
12	Hapoel Hatzor	30	–	–	–	37	53	−16	24	
13	Hapoel Afula	30	–	–	–	40	49	−9	23	
14	Beitar Tel Hanan	30	–	–	–	38	71	−33	23	
15	Beitar Nahariya	30	–	–	–	34	67	−33	19	Relegated to Liga Gimel
16	Beitar Migdal HaEmek	30	–	–	–	32	67	−35	18	Relegated to Liga Gimel

== North Division B ==
Pos	Team	Pld	W	D	L	GF	GA	GD	Pts	Promotion or relegation
1	Hapoel Givat Haim	30	–	–	–	106	36	+70	46	Promoted to Liga Alef
2	Hapoel Ra'anana	30	–	–	–	57	23	+34	46	
3	Hapoel Givat Olga	30	–	–	–	68	23	+45	43	
4	Maccabi Hadera	30	–	–	–	59	37	+22	35	
5	Hapoel Binyamina	30	–	–	–	51	55	−4	34	
6	Maccabi Pardes Hanna	30	–	–	–	58	48	+10	32	
7	M.S. Even Yehuda	30	–	–	–	36	38	−2	29	
8	Beitar Dov Netanya	30	–	–	–	45	51	−6	29	
9	Hapoel Ahva Haifa	30	–	–	–	66	59	+7	28	
10	Maccabi Zikhron Ya'akov	30	–	–	–	44	43	+1	27	
11	Hapoel Beit Eliezer	30	–	–	–	37	41	−4	27	
12	Beitar Binyamina	30	–	–	–	48	51	−3	26	
13	Hapoel Zikhron Ya'akov	30	–	–	–	38	57	−19	26	
14	Maccabi HaSharon Netanya	30	–	–	–	38	52	−14	25	
15	Hapoel Tel Mond	30	–	–	–	44	59	−15	24	Relegated to Liga Gimel
16	Hapoel Pardes Hanna	30	–	–	–	28	147	−119	5	Relegated to Liga Gimel

== South Division A ==
Pos	Team	Pld	W	D	L	GF	GA	GD	Pts	Promotion or relegation
1	Hapoel Ramla	30	–	–	–	70	16	+54	52	Promoted to Liga Alef
2	Hapoel Rosh HaAyin	30	–	–	–	54	20	+34	44	
3	Hapoel HaTzafon Tel Aviv	30	–	–	–	65	32	+33	43	
4	Hapoel Kafr Qasim	30	–	–	–	53	36	+17	36	
5	Beitar Bat Yam	30	–	–	–	44	31	+13	36	
6	Beitar Ramat Gan	30	–	–	–	48	32	+16	32	
7	Beitar Holon	30	–	–	–	41	35	+6	32	
8	Beitar Jaffa	30	–	–	–	42	40	+2	30	
9	Maccabi Holon	30	–	–	–	30	35	−5	30	
10	Hapoel Kfar Shalem	30	–	–	–	49	50	−1	28	
11	Hapoel Ganei Tikva	30	–	–	–	41	57	−16	27	
12	Maccabi HaShikma Ramat Gan	30	–	–	–	34	47	−13	24	
13	Hapoel Or Yehuda	30	–	–	–	28	47	−19	21	
14	Hapoel Ramat HaSharon	30	–	–	–	29	64	−35	18	
15	Hapoel Giv'at Shmuel	30	–	–	–	17	67	−50	13	Relegated to Liga Gimel
16	Hapoel Ginaton	30	–	–	–	32	78	−46	9	Relegated to Liga Gimel

== South Division B ==
Pos	Team	Pld	W	D	L	GF	GA	GD	Pts	Promotion or relegation
1	Hapoel Dimona	30	–	–	–	62	8	+54	53	Promoted to Liga Alef
2	Beitar Be'er Sheva	30	–	–	–	87	29	+58	48	
3	Maccabi Yavne	30	–	–	–	51	30	+21	38	
4	SK Nes Tziona	30	–	–	–	60	44	+16	33	
5	Hapoel Kiryat Malakhi	30	–	–	–	45	33	+12	33	
6	HaBira Jerusalem	30	–	–	–	57	48	+9	33	
7	Hapoel Ofakim	30	–	–	–	55	51	+4	31	
8	Beitar Ashkelon	30	–	–	–	48	54	−6	31	
9	Maccabi Kiryat Gat	30	–	–	–	48	54	−6	28	
10	Maccabi Be'er Sheva	30	–	–	–	48	45	+3	25	
11	Beitar Ashdod	30	–	–	–	40	48	−8	25	
12	Beitar Lod	30	–	–	–	54	51	+3	24	
13	Maccabi Rehovot	30	–	–	–	58	69	−11	24	
14	Hapoel Yeruham	30	–	–	–	34	54	−20	24	
15	Maccabi Ashkelon	30	–	–	–	36	63	−27	20	Relegated to Liga Gimel
16	Hapoel Sderot	30	–	–	–	26	127	−101	4	Relegated to Liga Gimel
