= 1973–74 Liga Alef =

Israeli football season

The 1973–74 Liga Alef season saw Hapoel Acre (champions of the North Division) and Maccabi Sha'arayim (champions of the South Division) win their regional divisions, and qualify with the second-placed clubs, Shimshon Tel Aviv and Hapoel Marmorek for promotion play-offs against the bottom two clubs in Liga Leumit, Hakoah Ramat Gan and Maccabi Haifa. Shimshon Tel Aviv were the only promoted club from Liga Alef to Liga Leumit.

On same basis, promotion-relegation play-offs contested between the bottom Liga Alef clubs and the top Liga Bet clubs.

== North Division ==
Pos	Team	Pld	W	D	L	GF	GA	GD	Pts	Qualification
1	Hapoel Acre	30	16	12	2	44	14	+30	44	Promotion play-offs
2	Shimshon Tel Aviv	30	17	9	4	59	19	+40	43	Promotion play-offs
3	Hapoel Ramat Gan	30	16	10	4	48	16	+32	42	
4	Hapoel Tiberias	30	14	7	9	33	33	0	35	
5	Hapoel Tirat HaCarmel	30	12	10	8	35	30	+5	34	
6	Beitar Netanya	30	9	14	7	26	27	−1	32	
7	Hapoel Safed	30	11	8	11	37	40	−3	30	
8	Hapoel Nahariya	30	11	5	14	34	42	−8	27	
9	Hapoel Nahliel	30	7	12	11	39	40	−1	26	
10	Hapoel Netanya	30	8	9	13	32	32	0	25	
11	Hapoel Kiryat Ata	30	6	12	12	33	31	+2	24	
12	Hapoel Bnei Nazareth	30	7	10	13	33	44	−11	24	
13	Hapoel Herzliya	30	9	6	15	24	35	−11	24	
14	Hapoel Kiryat Shmona	30	9	6	15	33	46	−13	24	
15	Maccabi Herzliya	30	7	10	13	28	44	−16	24	Relegation play-offs
16	Hapoel Migdal HaEmek	30	5	12	13	21	66	−45	22	Relegation play-offs

Source: rsssf.com

== South Division ==
Pos	Team	Pld	W	D	L	GF	GA	GD	Pts	Qualification
1	Maccabi Sha'arayim	30	17	8	5	56	29	+27	42	Promotion play-offs
2	Hapoel Marmorek	30	15	10	5	53	30	+23	40	Promotion play-offs
3	Hapoel Holon	30	13	9	8	40	28	+12	35	
4	Hapoel Yehud	30	13	8	9	47	36	+11	32 (Note: 2 points deducted.)	
5	Hapoel Rishon LeZion	30	10	11	9	39	43	−4	31	
6	Beitar Ramla	30	10	10	10	34	32	+2	30	
7	Hapoel Dimona	30	10	9	11	24	28	−4	29	
8	Hapoel Lod	30	9	11	10	43	51	−8	29	
9	Hapoel Be'er Ya'akov	30	13	3	14	36	47	−11	29	
10	Maccabi Ramat Amidar	30	10	8	12	36	30	+6	28	
11	Hapoel Ashdod	30	9	10	11	34	36	−2	28	
12	Hapoel Beit Shemesh	30	9	10	11	38	42	−4	28	
13	Hapoel Bat Yam	30	8	12	10	28	37	−9	28	
14	SK Nes Tziona	30	9	9	12	29	31	−2	27	
15	Hapoel Ramla	30	11	4	15	25	38	−13	26	Relegation play-offs
16	Maccabi Holon	30	3	10	17	23	47	−24	16	Relegation play-offs

Source: rsssf.com

== Promotion play-offs ==
Pos	Team	Pld	W	D	L	GF	GA	GD	Pts	Promotion or relegation
1	Hakoah Ramat Gan	5	4	0	1	14	6	+8	8	Remained in Liga Leumit
2	Shimshon Tel Aviv	5	4	0	1	10	4	+6	8	Promoted to Liga Leumit
3	Hapoel Marmorek	5	2	1	2	7	6	+1	5	Remained in Liga Alef
4	Maccabi Haifa	5	2	0	3	7	8	−1	4	Relegated to Liga Alef
5	Hapoel Acre	5	2	0	3	8	10	−2	4	Remained in Liga Alef
6	Maccabi Sha'arayim	5	0	1	4	5	17	−12	1	Remained in Liga Alef

Source: rsssf.com

== Relegation play-offs ==
=== North play-offs ===
Pos	Team	Pld	W	D	L	GF	GA	GD	Pts	Promotion or relegation
1	Maccabi Hadera	4	3	1	0	13	3	+10	7	Promoted to Liga Alef
2	Maccabi Herzliya	4	2	2	0	4	2	+2	6	Remained in Liga Alef
3	Hapoel Mahane Yehuda	4	2	0	2	5	3	+2	4	Remained in Liga Bet
4	Hapoel Beit She'an	4	1	0	3	2	7	−5	2	Remained in Liga Bet
5	Hapoel Migdal HaEmek	4	0	1	3	3	12	−9	1	Relegated to Liga Bet

Source: rsssf.com

Beitar Tiberias suspended from the play-offs due to crowd trouble against Hapoel Beit She'an.

=== South play-offs ===
Pos	Team	Pld	W	D	L	GF	GA	GD	Pts	Promotion or relegation
1	Beitar Jaffa	5	3	2	0	6	2	+4	8	Promoted to Liga Alef
2	Hapoel Ramla	5	3	1	1	6	4	+2	7	Remained in Liga Alef
3	Hapoel Ashkelon	5	2	2	1	5	2	+3	6	Remained in Liga Bet
4	Hapoel Kfar Shalem	5	2	1	2	6	5	+1	5	Remained in Liga Bet
5	Maccabi Yavne	5	1	2	2	1	3	−2	4	Remained in Liga Bet
6	Maccabi Holon	5	0	0	5	1	9	−8	0	Relegated to Liga Bet

Source: rsssf.com
