= 1976–77 Liga Bet =

Israeli football season

The 1976–77 Liga Bet season was the first in which Liga Bet was the fourth tier of Israeli football due to the formation of Liga Artzit.

Hapoel Tiberias, Hapoel Beit Eliezer, Hapoel Kiryat Ono and Hapoel Lod won their regional divisions and promoted to Liga Alef.

== North Division A ==
Pos	Team	Pld	W	D	L	GF	GA	GD	Pts	Promotion or relegation
1	Hapoel Tiberias	26	15	6	5	35	19	+16	36	Promoted to Liga Alef
2	Hapoel Kiryat Ata	26	14	7	5	46	27	+19	35	
3	Hapoel Kiryat Yam	26	13	7	6	47	23	+24	33	
4	Maccabi Neve Sha'anan	26	9	10	7	38	28	+10	28	
5	Hapoel Hatzor	26	10	8	8	42	38	+4	28	
6	Beitar Kiryat Shmona	26	9	10	7	33	35	−2	28	
7	Beitar Nahariya	26	9	9	8	34	34	0	27	
8	Ahi Bnei Nazareth	26	9	7	10	44	34	+10	25	
9	Maccabi Hatzor	26	10	5	11	46	50	−4	25	
10	Maccabi Tiberias	26	9	6	11	36	47	−11	24	
11	Maccabi Kiryat Bialik	26	8	6	12	36	35	+1	22	
12	Hapoel Majd al-Krum	26	9	4	13	32	44	−12	18 (Note: 4 points deducted)	
13	Hapoel Bnei Acre	26	5	7	14	25	44	−19	17	Relegated to Liga Gimel
14	Beitar Tiberias	26	6	2	18	22	57	−35	14	Relegated to Liga Gimel

== North Division B ==
Pos	Team	Pld	W	D	L	GF	GA	GD	Pts	Promotion or relegation
1	Hapoel Beit Eliezer	26	17	5	4	52	14	+38	39	Promoted to Liga Alef
2	Maccabi Zikhron Ya'akov	26	15	6	5	51	27	+24	36	
3	Hapoel Migdal HaEmek	26	15	4	7	53	24	+29	34	
4	Hapoel Kafr Sulam	26	12	5	9	42	35	+7	29	
5	Maccabi HaSharon Netanya	26	11	6	9	34	36	−2	28	
6	Hapoel Umm al-Fahm	26	12	2	12	47	44	+3	26	
7	Hapoel Givat Olga	26	10	6	10	37	37	0	26	
8	Hapoel Geva HaCarmel	26	9	5	12	33	42	−9	23	
9	Hapoel Kafr Qara	26	8	7	11	27	36	−9	23	
10	Hapoel HaTzair Haifa	26	8	6	12	41	44	−3	22	
11	Hapoel Binyamina	26	6	9	11	37	47	−10	21	
12	Hapoel Tayibe	26	6	9	11	24	37	−13	21	
13	Beitar Dov Netanya	26	8	5	13	35	49	−14	21	Relegated to Liga Gimel
14	Hapoel Afula	26	6	3	17	33	74	−41	9 (Note: 6 points deducted)	Relegated to Liga Gimel

== South Division A ==
Pos	Team	Pld	W	D	L	GF	GA	GD	Pts	Promotion or relegation
1	Hapoel Kiryat Ono	26	20	5	1	70	21	+49	45	Promoted to Liga Alef
2	Hapoel Ramat HaSharon	26	18	3	5	53	22	+31	39	
3	Tzafririm Holon	26	11	7	8	28	26	+2	29	
4	Beitar Herzliya	26	11	7	8	33	32	+1	29	
5	Beitar Mahane Yehuda	26	11	6	9	28	23	+5	28	
6	Beitar Holon	26	11	6	9	41	42	−1	28	
7	Hapoel Aliyah Kfar Saba	26	8	12	6	33	35	−2	28	
8	Hapoel Kafr Qasim	26	11	6	9	34	31	+3	26 (Note: 2 points deducted)	
9	Beitar Jaffa	26	10	3	13	28	37	−9	23	
10	Hapoel Kfar Shalem	26	9	3	14	43	42	+1	21	
11	Beitar Bat Yam	26	7	7	12	30	35	−5	21	
12	Beitar Ramat Gan	26	7	7	12	27	34	−7	21	
13	Maccabi Yehud	26	7	6	13	22	41	−19	20	Relegated to Liga Gimel
14	Hapoel Giv'atayim	26	1	2	23	15	69	−54	4	Relegated to Liga Gimel

== South Division B ==
Pos	Team	Pld	W	D	L	GF	GA	GD	Pts	Promotion or relegation
1	Hapoel Lod	26	16	6	4	49	16	+33	38	Promoted to Liga Alef
2	Maccabi Kiryat Gat	26	12	7	7	38	24	+14	31	
3	Maccabi Ramla	26	10	10	6	41	32	+9	30	
4	Maccabi Ashkelon	26	11	7	8	44	34	+10	29	
5	Beitar Be'er Sheva	26	11	6	9	41	43	−2	28	
6	Hapoel Merhavim	26	8	11	7	45	39	+6	27	
7	Hapoel Kiryat Malakhi	26	8	10	8	38	41	−3	26	
8	Hapoel Eilat	26	8	10	8	22	29	−7	26	
9	Hapoel Ofakim	26	7	10	9	35	39	−4	24	
10	Hapoel Kiryat Gat	26	9	5	12	38	43	−5	23	
11	Hapoel Gedera	26	6	11	9	26	35	−9	23	
12	Maccabi Rehovot	26	9	4	13	38	48	−10	22	
13	Beitar Ashkelon	26	7	6	13	36	50	−14	20	Relegated to Liga Gimel
14	Hapoel Shikun HaMizrah	26	6	5	15	25	43	−18	17	Relegated to Liga Gimel
