= 1989–90 Israel State Cup =

Tournament details
- Country: Israel

Final positions
- Champions: Hapoel Kfar Saba (3rd title)
- Runners-up: Shimshon Tel Aviv

The 1989–90 Israel State Cup (Hebrew: גביע המדינה, Gvia HaMedina) was the 51st season of Israel's nationwide football cup competition and the 36th after the Israeli Declaration of Independence.

The competition was won by Hapoel Kfar Saba who have beaten Shimshon Tel Aviv 1–0 in the final.

== Results ==
=== Seventh Round ===
| Home team | Score | Away team |
|---|---|---|
| Hapoel Tirat HaCarmel | 3–0 | Maccabi Sha'arayim |
| Hapoel Tzafririm Holon | 2–1 | Beitar Netanya |
| Hapoel Rishon LeZion | 1–4 | Hapoel Tiberias |
| Maccabi Tamra | 3–1 | Maccabi Hadera |
| Hapoel Daliyat al-Karmel | 1–0 | Hakoah Maccabi Ramat Gan |
| Maccabi Ironi Ashdod | 3–1 | Hapoel Ramla |
| Hapoel Lod | 1–0 | Hapoel Ra'anana |
| Hapoel Tel Hanan | 0–1 | Maccabi Yavne |
| Maccabi Ramat Amidar | 3–0 | Maccabi Acre |
| Hapoel Tayibe | 3–0 | Maccabi Kafr Kanna |
| Hapoel Bat Yam | 3–2 | Maccabi HaShikma Ramat Hen |
| Hapoel Beit Shemesh | 0–2 | Maccabi Jaffa |
| Maccabi Nahariya | 0–1 | Hapoel Ashkelon |
| Hapoel Kfar Shalem | 1–1, replay: 0–1 | Hapoel Yeruham |
| Hapoel Tel Aviv | 1–1, replay: 1–0 | Hapoel Hadera |
| Maccabi Petah Tikva | | Hapoel Haifa |

=== Eighth Round ===
| Home team | Score | Away team |
|---|---|---|
| Hapoel Tel Aviv | 3–1 | Beitar Tel Aviv |
| Hapoel Tzafririm Holon | 0–2 | Maccabi Tel Aviv |
| Maccabi Tamra | 2–3 (a.e.t.) | Beitar Jerusalem |
| Maccabi Petah Tikva | 1–1, replay: 1–2 | Shimshon Tel Aviv |
| Bnei Yehuda | 5–1 | Hapoel Ashkelon |
| Hapoel Daliyat al-Karmel | 2–3 (a.e.t.) | Hapoel Petah Tikva |
| Maccabi Yavne | 3–1 | Hapoel Jerusalem |
| Hapoel Ramat Gan | 2–1 | Hapoel Tiberias |
| Hapoel Kfar Saba | 4–1 | Hapoel Tayibe |
| Hapoel Be'er Sheva | 1–0 | Maccabi Ironi Ashdod |
| Maccabi Ramat Amidar | 0–2 | Maccabi Netanya |
| Maccabi Haifa | 7–0 | Hapoel Tirat HaCarmel |

Byes: Hapoel Bat Yam, Hapoel Lod, Hapoel Yeruham, Maccabi Jaffa.

=== Round of 16 ===
| Team 1 | Agg. | Team 2 | 1st leg | 2nd leg |
|---|---|---|---|---|
| Hapoel Tel Aviv | 2–2 (a) | Maccabi Haifa | 0–0 | 2–2 |
| Maccabi Netanya | 1–1 (a) | Hapoel Petah Tikva | 1–1 | 0–0 |
| Hapoel Be'er Sheva | 2–1 | Beitar Jerusalem | 2–1 | 0–0 |
| Maccabi Tel Aviv | 0–2 | Hapoel Kfar Saba | 0–0 | 0–2 |
| Hapoel Ramat Gan | 0–1 | Shimshon Tel Aviv | 0–1 | 0–0 |
| Maccabi Jaffa | 3–5 | Bnei Yehuda | 1–3 | 2–2 |
| Hapoel Lod | 1–7 | Hapoel Yeruham | 1–1 | 0–6 |
| Maccabi Yavne | 2–3 | Hapoel Bat Yam | 1–1 | 1–2 |

=== Quarter-finals ===
| Team 1 | Agg. | Team 2 | 1st leg | 2nd leg |
|---|---|---|---|---|
| Hapoel Kfar Saba | 2–0 | Hapoel Tel Aviv | 0–0 | 2–0 |
| Hapoel Yeruham | 0–2 | Hapoel Be'er Sheva | 0–1 | 0–1 |
| Shimshon Tel Aviv | 1–0 | Hapoel Bat Yam | 0–0 | 1–0 |
| Bnei Yehuda | 2–3 | Hapoel Petah Tikva | 2–1 | 0–2 |

=== Semi-finals ===
| Home team | Score | Away team |
|---|---|---|
| Shimshon Tel Aviv | 4–1 | Hapoel Petah Tikva |
| Hapoel Kfar Saba | 3–2 (a.e.t.) | Hapoel Be'er Sheva |

=== Final ===
4 June 1990

| Shimshon Tel Aviv | 0–1 (a.e.t.) | Hapoel Kfar Saba |
|---|---|---|
| | | Simon 92' |

Ramat Gan Stadium
Attendance: 8000
Referee: Sharir
