= 1979–80 Liga Alef =

Israeli football season

The 1979–80 Liga Alef season saw Hapoel Kiryat Shmona (champions of the North Division) and Maccabi Yavne (champions of the South Division) win the title and promotion to Liga Artzit.

Promotion play-offs, played in two legs, which both held in neutral venue, contested between the second placed clubs in each regional division. Beitar Ramla won over Hapoel Ramat HaSharon, and became the third promoted club.

== North Division ==
Pos	Team	Pld	W	D	L	GF	GA	GD	Pts	Promotion or relegation
1	Hapoel Kiryat Shmona	26	15	7	4	42	16	+26	37	Promoted to Liga Artzit
2	Hapoel Ramat HaSharon	26	14	7	5	36	22	+14	35	Promotion play-offs
3	Maccabi Hadera	26	12	11	3	39	16	+23	33 (Note: 2 points deducted.)	
4	Hapoel Givat Olga	26	12	9	5	34	24	+10	33	
5	Hapoel Netanya	26	11	10	5	44	24	+20	32	
6	Hapoel Tel Hanan	26	11	8	7	36	23	+13	30	
7	Beitar Netanya	26	8	11	7	27	20	+7	27	
8	Hapoel Ra'anana	26	9	8	9	27	24	+3	26	
9	Hapoel Afikim	26	8	9	9	46	37	+9	25	
10	Hapoel Kiryat Ata	26	7	9	10	29	28	+1	23	
11	Hapoel Bnei Nazareth	26	5	10	11	26	37	−11	20	
12	Hapoel Nahariya	26	5	8	13	22	32	−10	18	
13	Maccabi Ahi Nazareth	26	4	9	13	25	37	−12	16 (Note: No points or goals were awarded for Maccabi Ahi Nazareth - Hapoel Umm al-Fahm due to suspicions of bribery in the match, which ended 21-1.)	Relegated to Liga Bet
14	Hapoel Umm al-Fahm	26	1	4	21	9	104	−95	5	Relegated to Liga Bet

== South Division ==
Pos	Team	Pld	W	D	L	GF	GA	GD	Pts	Promotion or relegation
1	Maccabi Yavne	26	15	6	5	34	19	+15	36	Promoted to Liga Artzit
2	Beitar Ramla	26	12	9	5	32	20	+12	33	Promotion play-offs
3	Hapoel Ramla	26	12	10	4	29	13	+16	32 (Note: 2 points deducted.)	
4	Beitar Be'er Sheva	26	11	10	5	30	20	+10	32	
5	Maccabi Sha'arayim	26	9	11	6	38	30	+8	27	
6	Maccabi Kiryat Gat	26	9	9	8	22	22	0	27	
7	Hapoel Ashkelon	26	9	7	10	28	25	+3	25	
8	Hapoel Ashdod	26	9	7	10	28	32	−4	25	
9	Hapoel Dimona	26	8	5	13	31	34	−3	21	
10	Hapoel Kiryat Ono	26	7	9	10	29	35	−6	21	
11	Hapoel Marmorek	26	4	13	9	23	30	−7	21	
12	Lazarus Holon	26	6	9	11	22	33	−11	21	
13	Hapoel Or Yehuda	26	4	12	10	19	31	−12	20	Relegated to Liga Bet
14	Hapoel Kafr Qasim	26	5	7	14	26	47	−21	17	Relegated to Liga Bet

== Promotion play-offs ==
10.5.1980

Hapoel Ramat HaSharon	0 – 0	Beitar Ramla

Hapoel Petah Tikva
17.5.1980

Beitar Ramla	2 – 1	Hapoel Ramat HaSharon

Hapoel Petah Tikva
Attendance: 5,000
Referee: Abraham Klein

Beitar Ramla promoted to Liga Artzit.
