= 1980–81 Liga Bet =

Israeli football season

The 1980–81 Liga Bet season saw Hapoel Migdal HaEmek, Beitar Haifa, Hapoel Azor and Hapoel Yeruham win their regional divisions and promoted to Liga Alef.

At the bottom, Hapoel Kfar Kama, Beitar Kiryat Shmona (from North A division), Hapoel Kiryat Yam, Beitar Binyamina (from North B division), Maccabi Ramla, Beitar Herzliya (from South A division), Maccabi Shikun HaMizrah and Beitar Ashdod (from South B division) were all automatically relegated to Liga Gimel.

== North Division A ==
Pos	Team	Pld	W	D	L	GF	GA	GD	Pts	Promotion or relegation
1	Hapoel Migdal HaEmek	26	–	–	–	53	17	+36	42	Promoted to Liga Alef
2	Maccabi Bnei Hatzor (Note: Maccabi Hatzor merged with Hapoel Hatzor to form Maccabi Bnei Hatzor. as the league schedule was made prior to the merger and both Hapoel Hatzor and Maccabi Hatzor were drawn separately, the spare place in the division was filled by promoting Hapoel Bnei Rameh from Liga Gimel.)	26	–	–	–	47	31	+16	33	
3	Maccabi Afula	26	–	–	–	42	35	+7	31	
4	Hapoel Safed	26	–	–	–	36	30	+6	29	
5	Maccabi Kiryat Bialik	26	–	–	–	35	31	+4	29	
6	Sektzia Ma'alot	26	–	–	–	50	45	+5	26	
7	Maccabi Neve Sha'anan	26	–	–	–	38	36	+2	24	
8	Hapoel Bnei Rameh	26	–	–	–	37	38	−1	24	
9	Maccabi Acre	26	–	–	–	31	40	−9	24	
10	Hapoel Bnei Acre	26	–	–	–	39	43	−4	22	
11	Hapoel Makr	26	–	–	–	28	39	−11	22	
12	Hapoel Kfar Kama (Note: Hapoel Kfar Kama withdrew from the league at the end of the season, despite being drawn for the league schedule of the following season. as a result, Maccabi Ahi Nazareth were reprieved from relegation.)	26	–	–	–	24	45	−21	19	Relegated to Liga Gimel
13	Maccabi Ahi Nazareth	26	–	–	–	35	37	−2	18	
14	Beitar Kiryat Shmona	26	–	–	–	22	56	−34	15	Relegated to Liga Gimel

== North Division B ==
Pos	Team	Pld	W	D	L	GF	GA	GD	Pts	Promotion or relegation
1	Beitar Haifa	26	–	–	–	59	21	+38	41	Promoted to Liga Alef
2	Hapoel Kafr Qara	26	–	–	–	49	43	+6	31	
3	Hapoel Daliyat al-Karmel	26	–	–	–	39	41	−2	30	
4	Hapoel Kafr Sulam	26	–	–	–	50	26	+24	27	
5	Hapoel Nahliel	26	–	–	–	26	18	+8	27	
6	Hapoel Givat Haim	26	–	–	–	36	38	−2	26	
7	Hapoel Afula	26	–	–	–	37	41	−4	24	
8	Hapoel Umm al-Fahm	26	–	–	–	40	47	−7	22	
9	Maccabi Fureidis	26	–	–	–	35	54	−19	22	
10	Hapoel HaTzair Haifa	26	–	–	–	40	52	−12	21	
11	Hapoel Tayibe	26	–	–	–	29	34	−5	20	
12	Hapoel Aliyah Kfar Saba	26	–	–	–	24	38	−14	20	
13	Hapoel Kiryat Yam	26	–	–	–	39	35	+4	19	Relegated to Liga Gimel
14	Beitar Binyamina	26	–	–	–	25	50	−25	14	Relegated to Liga Gimel

== South Division A ==
Pos	Team	Pld	W	D	L	GF	GA	GD	Pts	Promotion or relegation
1	Hapoel Azor	26	–	–	–	42	26	+16	35	Promoted to Liga Alef
2	Hapoel Jaljulia	26	–	–	–	47	26	+21	33	
3	Hapoel Kafr Qasim	26	–	–	–	40	27	+13	33	
4	Hapoel Or Yehuda	26	–	–	–	41	28	+13	30	
5	Tzafririm Holon	26	–	–	–	38	32	+6	27	
6	Hapoel Ihud Tzeirei Jaffa	26	–	–	–	32	30	+2	27	
7	Hapoel Kfar Shalem	26	–	–	–	30	25	+5	26	
8	Maccabi HaShikma Ramat Gan	26	–	–	–	36	30	+6	25	
9	Hapoel Ganei Tikva	26	–	–	–	31	30	+1	25	
10	Hapoel Tira	26	–	–	–	27	28	−1	25	
11	Hapoel Kiryat Shalom	26	–	–	–	32	39	−7	25	
12	Hapoel Mahane Yehuda	26	–	–	–	20	29	−9	23	
13	Maccabi Ramla	26	–	–	–	23	40	−17	23	Relegated to Liga Gimel
14	Beitar Herzliya	26	–	–	–	9	51	−42	7	Relegated to Liga Gimel

== South Division B ==
Pos	Team	Pld	W	D	L	GF	GA	GD	Pts	Promotion or relegation
1	Hapoel Yeruham	26	–	–	–	41	17	+24	40	Promoted to Liga Alef
2	Hapoel Sderot	26	–	–	–	41	30	+11	31	
3	Hapoel Gedera	26	–	–	–	39	40	−1	28	
4	Hapoel Kiryat Malakhi	26	–	–	–	38	34	+4	27	
5	Maccabi Ashkelon	26	–	–	–	41	46	−5	26	
6	SK Nes Tziona	26	–	–	–	46	44	+2	25	
7	Hapoel Be'er Ya'akov	26	–	–	–	33	35	−2	25	
8	Maccabi Ashdod	26	5	15	6	20	22	−2	25	
9	Beitar Lod	26	–	–	–	23	32	−9	25	
10	Hapoel Merhavim	26	–	–	–	42	45	−3	24	
11	Hapoel Bnei Zion	26	–	–	–	31	39	−8	24	
12	Maccabi Rehovot	26	–	–	–	29	41	−12	24	
13	Maccabi Shikun HaMizrah	26	–	–	–	36	38	−2	22	Relegated to Liga Gimel
14	Beitar Ashdod	26	–	–	–	35	38	−3	20	Relegated to Liga Gimel
