= 1974–75 Liga Bet =

Israeli football season

The 1974–75 Liga Bet season saw Hapoel Tel Hanan, Hapoel Mahane Yehuda, Maccabi HaShikma Ramat Gan and Beitar Ashdod win their regional divisions and promoted to Liga Alef.

== North Division A ==
Pos	Team	Pld	W	D	L	GF	GA	GD	Pts	Promotion or relegation
1	Hapoel Tel Hanan	30	–	–	–	83	14	+69	50	Promoted to Liga Alef
2	Hapoel Nazareth Illit	30	–	–	–	78	32	+46	47	
3	Beitar Nahariya	30	–	–	–	59	41	+18	39	
4	Hapoel Afikim	30	–	–	–	60	32	+28	38	
5	Hapoel Migdal HaEmek	30	–	–	–	56	51	+5	35	
6	Hapoel Beit She'an	30	–	–	–	64	43	+21	33	
7	Maccabi Ahi Nazareth	30	–	–	–	40	44	−4	26	
8	Hapoel Majd al-Krum	30	–	–	–	40	53	−13	26	
9	Beitar Tiberias	30	–	–	–	53	70	−17	25	
10	Beitar Kiryat Shmona	30	–	–	–	44	74	−30	25	
11	Hapoel Kiryat Tiv'on	30	–	–	–	53	69	−16	24	
12	Maccabi Tiberias	30	–	–	–	35	55	−20	24	
13	Hapoel Hatzor	30	–	–	–	32	53	−21	23	
14	Hapoel Kfar Ruppin	29	–	–	–	39	45	−6	21	
15	Hapoel Kiryat Haim	30	–	–	–	39	60	−21	19	Relegated to Liga Gimel
16	Maccabi Hatzor	29	–	–	–	23	62	−39	17	Relegated to Liga Gimel

== North Division B ==
Pos	Team	Pld	W	D	L	GF	GA	GD	Pts	Promotion or relegation
1	Hapoel Mahane Yehuda	30	–	–	–	91	21	+70	51	Promoted to Liga Alef
2	Hapoel Givat Haim	30	–	–	–	76	35	+41	41	
3	Hapoel Ra'anana	30	–	–	–	58	36	+22	37	
4	Maccabi Zikhron Ya'akov	30	–	–	–	57	59	−2	33	
5	Hapoel Kiryat Yam	30	–	–	–	85	54	+31	30	
6	Hapoel Binyamina	30	–	–	–	47	48	−1	30	
7	Hapoel Givat Olga	30	–	–	–	49	50	−1	29	
8	Beitar Dov Netanya	30	–	–	–	52	48	+4	28	
9	Maccabi Kiryat Bialik	30	–	–	–	42	50	−8	27	
10	Hapoel Tayibe	30	–	–	–	33	57	−24	27	
11	Hapoel Geva HaCarmel	30	–	–	–	45	74	−29	27	
12	Hapoel Afula	30	–	–	–	40	65	−25	26	
13	Maccabi HaSharon Netanya	29	–	–	–	46	51	−5	25	
14	Hapoel Beit Eliezer	29	–	–	–	30	38	−8	25	
15	Maccabi Pardes Hanna	29	–	–	–	32	59	−27	23	Relegated to Liga Gimel
16	Beitar Binyamina	29	–	–	–	34	72	−38	15	Relegated to Liga Gimel

== South Division A ==
Pos	Team	Pld	W	D	L	GF	GA	GD	Pts	Promotion or relegation
1	Maccabi HaShikma Ramat Gan	30	–	–	–	69	24	+45	47	Promoted to Liga Alef
2	Hapoel Or Yehuda	30	–	–	–	56	27	+29	44	
3	Hapoel Aliyah Kfar Saba	30	–	–	–	49	32	+17	40	
4	Hapoel Kiryat Ono	30	–	–	–	50	37	+13	37	
5	Hapoel Kfar Shalem	30	–	–	–	41	41	0	34	
6	Hapoel Rosh HaAyin	30	–	–	–	39	33	+6	32	
7	Hapoel Kafr Qasim	30	–	–	–	41	39	+2	31	
8	Beitar Herzliya	30	–	–	–	43	49	−6	27	
9	Beitar Ramat Gan	30	–	–	–	26	35	−9	27	
10	Hapoel Giv'atayim	30	–	–	–	33	34	−1	26	
11	Beitar Bat Yam	30	–	–	–	30	35	−5	24	
12	Beitar Holon	30	–	–	–	35	45	−10	24	
13	Beitar Lod	30	–	–	–	33	46	−13	24	
14	Maccabi Yehud	30	–	–	–	31	58	−27	23	
15	Hapoel HaTzafon Tel Aviv	30	–	–	–	31	47	−16	22	Relegated to Liga Gimel
16	Maccabi Holon	30	–	–	–	30	55	−25	16	Relegated to Liga Gimel

== South Division B ==
Pos	Team	Pld	W	D	L	GF	GA	GD	Pts	Promotion or relegation
1	Beitar Ashdod	30	–	–	–	62	30	+32	45	Promoted to Liga Alef
2	Maccabi Yavne	30	–	–	–	57	29	+28	40	
3	Hapoel Merhavim	30	–	–	–	78	36	+42	39	
4	Hapoel Ashkelon	30	–	–	–	62	29	+33	39	
5	Beitar Be'er Sheva	30	–	–	–	41	32	+9	36	
6	Hapoel Eilat	30	–	–	–	45	32	+13	34	
7	Maccabi Be'er Sheva	30	–	–	–	42	36	+6	34	
8	Hapoel Kiryat Gat	30	–	–	–	30	39	−9	30	
9	Maccabi Jerusalem	30	–	–	–	45	53	−8	27	
10	Hapoel Ofakim	30	–	–	–	42	39	+3	26	
11	Maccabi Ramla	30	–	–	–	33	45	−12	25	
12	Beitar Ashkelon	30	–	–	–	41	77	−36	25	
13	Hapoel Shikun HaMizrah	30	–	–	–	27	39	−12	24	
14	Maccabi Kiryat Gat	30	–	–	–	26	40	−14	22	
15	Hapoel Yeruham	30	–	–	–	32	59	−27	18	Relegated to Liga Gimel
16	Hapoel Kiryat Malakhi	30	–	–	–	24	72	−48	14	Relegated to Liga Gimel
