= Hadar Barad =

Israeli footballer

Hadar Barad הדר ברד
Personal information
- Full name: Hadar Barad
- Date of birth: 20 November 1995 (age 30)
- Place of birth: Meitar, Israel
- Height: 1.75 m (5 ft 9 in)
- Position: Central midfielder

Team information
- Current team: Bnei Eilat
- Number: 88

Youth career
- Hapoel Be'er Sheva

Senior career*
Years	Team	Apps	(Gls)
2015–2016	Hapoel Be'er Sheva	1	(0)
2016–2017	F.C. Be'er Sheva	26	(2)
2017–2018	Hapoel Jerusalem	23	(0)
2018	Maccabi Be'er Sheva	10	(4)
2018–2019	Maccabi Yavne	8	(0)
2019–2020	Hapoel Yeruham	21	(6)
2020–2021	F.C. Dimona	8	(0)
2021–2022	Bnei Eilat	6	(0)
2022–2024	F.C. Jerusalem	33	(3)
2024–	F.C. Sderot	22	(2)
- * Club domestic league appearances and goals as of 1 June 2025

Hadar Barad (Hebrew: הדר ברד; born 20 November 1995, in Be'er Sheva) is an Israeli footballer who plays for F.C. Jerusalem as a central midfielder.

He made his debut for Hapoel Be'er Sheva against Maccabi Yavne in State Cup, in January 2015.

== Club career statistics ==
(correct as of July 2015)

Club	Season	League	League		Cup		Toto Cup		Europe		Total	
Club	Season	League	Apps	Goals	Apps	Goals	Apps	Goals	Apps	Goals	Apps	Goals
Hapoel Be'er Sheva	2014–15	Ligat Ha'Al	1	0	1	0	0	0	0	0	2	0
Hapoel Be'er Sheva	2015–16	Ligat Ha'Al	0	0	0	0	0	0	0	0	0	0
Career		Ligat Ha'Al	1	0	1	0	2	0	0	0	2	0

== Honours ==
Hapoel Be'er Sheva

- Israeli State Cup: 2014-15 (runner-up)
