= 1982–83 Liga Artzit =

Football season

The 1982–83 Liga Artzit season saw Beitar Tel Aviv win the title and promotion to Liga Leumit. Hakoah Ramat Gan and Maccabi Ramat Amidar were also promoted.

Maccabi Shefa-'Amr, Hapoel Acre and Hapoel Tel Hanan were all relegated to Liga Alef.

It was also the first season that the Three points for a win system was introduced.

== Final table ==
Pos	Team	Pld	W	D	L	GF	GA	GD	Pts	Promotion or relegation
1	Beitar Tel Aviv	30	16	9	5	35	23	+12	57	Promoted to Liga Leumit
2	Hakoah Ramat Gan	30	15	10	5	46	24	+22	55	Promoted to Liga Leumit
3	Maccabi Ramat Amidar	30	14	12	4	39	22	+17	54	Promoted to Liga Leumit
4	Hapoel Haifa	30	14	9	7	36	30	+6	51	
5	Hapoel Rishon LeZion	30	13	9	8	38	30	+8	48	
6	Hapoel Petah Tikva	30	13	8	9	34	31	+3	47	
7	Hapoel Ashkelon	30	10	15	5	29	19	+10	43 (Note: Two points deducted)	
8	Hapoel Hadera	30	9	11	10	48	45	+3	38	
9	Hapoel Nazareth Illit	30	9	9	12	37	41	−4	36	
10	Beitar Ramla	30	8	12	10	34	39	−5	36	
11	Hapoel Beit She'an	30	9	7	14	36	40	−4	34	
12	Hapoel Beit Shemesh	30	7	11	12	27	35	−8	32	
13	Hapoel Kiryat Shmona	30	7	11	12	19	31	−12	32	
14	Maccabi Shefa-'Amr	30	5	12	13	27	38	−11	27	Relegated to Liga Alef
15	Hapoel Acre	30	7	6	17	23	32	−9	24 (Note: Three points deducted)	Relegated to Liga Alef
16	Hapoel Tel Hanan	30	3	11	16	19	47	−28	20	Relegated to Liga Alef
