= 1974–75 Liga Alef =

Israeli football season

The 1974–75 Liga Alef season saw Maccabi Haifa (champions of the North Division) and Maccabi Ramat Amidar (champions of the South Division) promoted to Liga Leumit.

Although two clubs in each regional division were due to be relegated, they were eventually reprieved after the Israel Football Association decided to expand Liga Leumit to 18 clubs, and Liga Alef to 17 clubs in each division for the following season.

== North Division ==
Pos	Team	Pld	W	D	L	GF	GA	GD	Pts	Promotion
1	Maccabi Haifa	30	16	9	5	39	18	+21	41	Promoted to Liga Leumit
2	Hapoel Acre	30	14	8	8	42	25	+17	36	
3	Hapoel Ramat Gan	30	13	7	10	41	29	+12	33	
4	Hapoel Netanya	30	10	11	9	40	38	+2	31	
5	Maccabi Hadera	30	8	14	8	33	32	+1	30	
6	Hapoel Nahliel	30	9	12	9	30	33	−3	30	
7	Maccabi Herzliya	30	9	12	9	31	35	−4	30	
8	Hapoel Tirat HaCarmel	30	9	11	10	29	29	0	29	
9	Beitar Netanya	30	8	13	9	27	27	0	29	
10	Hapoel Bnei Nazareth	30	10	9	11	34	35	−1	29	
11	Hapoel Tiberias	30	8	13	9	25	28	−3	29	
12	Hapoel Nahariya	30	7	14	9	18	23	−5	28	
13	Hapoel Herzliya	30	4	19	7	27	29	−2	27	
14	Hapoel Kiryat Ata	30	8	11	11	20	32	−12	27	
15	Hapoel Kiryat Shmona	30	10	5	15	32	43	−11	25	Reprieved from relegation
16	Hapoel Safed	30	6	13	11	25	37	−12	25	Reprieved from relegation

== South Division ==
Pos	Team	Pld	W	D	L	GF	GA	GD	Pts	Promotion
1	Maccabi Ramat Amidar	30	18	7	5	55	20	+35	43	Promoted to Liga Leumit
2	Hapoel Yehud	30	16	10	4	51	19	+32	42	
3	Hapoel Rishon LeZion	30	15	11	4	64	33	+31	41	
4	Hapoel Bat Yam	30	16	7	7	45	32	+13	39	
5	Hapoel Dimona	30	11	10	9	41	30	+11	32	
6	Hapoel Be'er Ya'akov	30	13	6	11	45	50	−5	32	
7	Maccabi Sha'arayim	30	12	6	12	55	63	−8	30	
8	Beitar Ramla	30	10	8	12	27	25	+2	28	
9	Hapoel Beit Shemesh	30	8	12	10	39	41	−2	28	
10	Hapoel Marmorek	30	11	6	13	29	32	−3	28	
11	Hapoel Ashdod	30	11	5	14	45	49	−4	27	
12	Hapoel Lod	30	8	11	11	35	51	−16	27	
13	Hapoel Holon	30	8	10	12	36	38	−2	26	
14	Hapoel Ramla	30	8	7	15	26	39	−13	23	
15	SK Nes Tziona	30	9	4	17	35	45	−10	22	Reprieved from relegation
16	Beitar Jaffa	30	1	6	23	19	80	−61	8	Reprieved from relegation
