= 1980–81 Liga Artzit =

The 1980–81 Liga Artzit season saw Beitar Tel Aviv win the title and win promotion to Liga Leumit. Beitar Jerusalem and Maccabi Haifa were also promoted.

Hapoel Hadera, Hapoel Holon and Maccabi Herzliya were all relegated to Liga Alef.

== Final table ==
| Pos | Team | Pld | W | D | L | GF | GA | GD | Pts | Promotion or relegation |
|---|---|---|---|---|---|---|---|---|---|---|
| 1 | Beitar Tel Aviv | 30 | 20 | 7 | 3 | 61 | 25 | +36 | 47 | Promoted to Liga Leumit |
| 2 | Beitar Jerusalem | 30 | 19 | 8 | 3 | 51 | 11 | +40 | 46 | Promoted to Liga Leumit |
| 3 | Maccabi Haifa | 30 | 18 | 8 | 4 | 51 | 22 | +29 | 44 | Promoted to Liga Leumit |
| 4 | Hakoah Ramat Gan | 30 | 12 | 9 | 9 | 41 | 37 | +4 | 33 | |
| 5 | Hapoel Nazareth Illit | 30 | 8 | 14 | 8 | 31 | 31 | 0 | 30 | |
| 6 | Hapoel Kiryat Shmona | 30 | 10 | 10 | 10 | 39 | 41 | −2 | 30 | |
| 7 | Hapoel Acre | 30 | 9 | 11 | 10 | 25 | 26 | −1 | 29 | |
| 8 | Hapoel Lod | 30 | 11 | 7 | 12 | 26 | 32 | −6 | 29 | |
| 9 | Maccabi Yavne | 30 | 7 | 13 | 10 | 28 | 27 | +1 | 27 | |
| 10 | Beitar Ramla | 30 | 6 | 14 | 10 | 18 | 23 | −5 | 26 | |
| 11 | Hapoel Beit Shemesh | 30 | 7 | 12 | 11 | 33 | 41 | −8 | 26 | |
| 12 | Hapoel Tiberias | 30 | 10 | 6 | 14 | 36 | 46 | −10 | 24 (Note: 2 points deducted?) | |
| 13 | Hapoel Beit She'an | 30 | 4 | 16 | 10 | 24 | 42 | −18 | 24 | |
| 14 | Hapoel Hadera | 30 | 4 | 14 | 12 | 21 | 33 | −12 | 22 | Relegated to Liga Alef |
| 15 | Hapoel Holon | 30 | 4 | 13 | 13 | 16 | 44 | −28 | 21 | Relegated to Liga Alef |
| 16 | Maccabi Herzliya | 30 | 4 | 12 | 14 | 29 | 49 | −20 | 20 | Relegated to Liga Alef |
