= Hapoel Ahva Haifa F.C. =

Israeli football club

Hapoel Ahva Haifa
- Full name: Hapoel Ahva Haifa Football Club הפועל אחוה חיפה
- Founded: 1959
- Ground: Avi Ran, Haifa
- Chairman: Issa Houri
- League: Liga Gimel Samaria
- 2015–16: 9th
Home colours	Away colours

Hapoel Ahva Haifa (Hebrew: הפועל אחוה חיפה) is an Israeli football club based in Haifa. The club currently plays in Liga Gimel Samaria division and play home matches at the Avi Ran Ground in Haifa. Their main rivals are Beitar Haifa.

== History ==
The club was founded in 1959 and was one of the first Arab-Israeli football clubs in Israel. According to the club's founder and chairman, Issa Houri, "Following the dissolution of Ahva Notzrit Haifa (in 1956), Ahva (which means "brotherhood" in Hebrew) was founded in the meaning of brotherhood of people. The club is proud in a squad consisting of Christians, Muslims and Jews".

Ahva Haifa played mostly in the lower divisions of Israeli football. The club reached Liga Bet (then the third tier), for the first time in the 1971–72 season and finished ninth in North B division. However, in the following season they were relegated back to Liga Gimel after second bottom finish. 28 years later, in the 2001–02 season, the club returned to Liga Bet (now as the fifth tier), and in the 2005–06 season, they won Liga Bet North B division and were promoted to Liga Alef. In the 2007–08 season, the club finished second bottom in Liga Alef North and relegated back to Liga Bet. The club suffered further relegation at the end of the 2012–13 season, after they lost in the Liga Bet North A relegation play-offs to Hapoel Ihud Bnei Sumei and Hapoel Sakhnin and relegated to Liga Gimel, now the fifth and lowest tier of Israeli football, where they play today.

== Honours ==
=== League ===
Honour	No.	Years
Fifth tier	1	2005–06

=== Cups ===
Honour	No.	Years
Liga Bet divisional State Cup	1	2009–10
