= 2003–04 Liga Alef =

Israeli football season

The 2003–04 Liga Alef season saw Maccabi Hadera (champions of the North Division) and Maccabi Be'er Sheva (champions of the South Division) winning the title and promotion to 2004–05. However as Maccabi Hadera folded during the following summer, eventually second placed Maccabi Tirat HaCarmel was promoted instead. During the summer Maccabi Kiryat Gat was demoted to Liga Alef, and Maccabi HaShikma Ramat Hen was promoted to Liga Artzit as well.

At the bottom, following a series of reprieves, caused by Maccabi Hadera and Hapoel Bat Yam folding and Maccabi Kiryat Gat being demoted to Liga Alef, only one club, Hapoel Migdal HaEmek was automatically relegated to Liga Bet.

== North Division ==
Pos	Team	Pld	W	D	L	GF	GA	GD	Pts	Promotion or relegation
1	Maccabi Hadera	26	13	8	5	38	23	+15	47	Promoted to Liga Artzit, folded
2	Maccabi Ironi Tirat HaCarmel	26	13	7	6	28	20	+8	46	Promoted to Liga Artzit
3	Hapoel Asi Gilboa	26	12	7	7	46	32	+14	43	
4	Maccabi Tzur Shalom	26	12	7	7	39	34	+5	43	
5	Hapoel Tuba	26	10	6	10	39	34	+5	36	
6	Maccabi Tamra	26	10	6	10	29	26	+3	36	
7	Hapoel Makr	26	9	8	9	34	41	−7	35	
8	Maccabi Tur'an	26	8	9	9	30	35	−5	33	
9	Hapoel Kafr Kanna	26	9	6	11	33	42	−9	33	
10	Hapoel Kafr Sumei	26	9	5	12	33	34	−1	32	
11	Hapoel Reineh	26	9	5	12	36	38	−2	32	
12	Maccabi Shefa-'Amr	26	8	6	12	30	30	0	30	
13	Ironi Shlomi	26	7	7	12	19	31	−12	28	
14	Hapoel Migdal HaEmek	26	8	3	15	29	43	−14	27	Relegated to Liga Bet

== South Division ==
Pos	Team	Pld	W	D	L	GF	GA	GD	Pts	Promotion or relegation
1	Maccabi Be'er Sheva	26	22	4	0	68	13	+55	70	Promoted to Liga Artzit
2	Maccabi HaShikma Ramat Hen	26	15	6	5	39	19	+20	51	Promoted to Liga Artzit
3	Ironi Ofakim	26	15	5	6	53	26	+27	50	
4	Hapoel Jaljulia	26	8	12	6	30	37	−7	36	
5	Maccabi Yavne	26	8	11	7	29	27	+2	35	
6	Beitar Kiryat Gat	26	9	8	9	33	33	0	35	
7	Hapoel Kfar Shalem	26	8	9	9	26	35	−9	33	
8	Maccabi Sha'arayim	26	7	11	8	38	31	+7	32	
9	F.C. Kafr Qasim	26	8	7	11	24	34	−10	31	
10	A.S. Ramat Eliyahu	26	7	7	12	35	46	−11	28	
11	Beitar Giv'at Ze'ev	26	7	6	13	32	52	−20	27	
12	Hapoel Nahlat Yehuda	26	6	7	13	26	33	−7	25	
13	Hapoel Bat Yam	26	6	7	13	28	41	−13	22 (Note: 3 points deducted.)	Folded
14	Hapoel Mevaseret Zion	26	3	6	17	19	53	−34	15	
