= Stav Elimelech =

Israeli footballer

Stav Elimelech סתיו אלימלך
Personal information
- Full name: Stav Elimelech
- Date of birth: 9 November 1969 (age 56)
- Place of birth: Be'er Sheva, Israel
- Height: 1.77 m (5 ft 9 1/2 in)
- Position: Defensive midfielder

Youth career
- Hapoel Be'er Sheva

Senior career*
Years	Team	Apps	(Gls)
1987–1997	Hapoel Be'er Sheva	231	(6)
1997–1998	Bnei Yehuda	23	(1)
1998–2005	Hapoel Be'er Sheva	200	(4)

International career
1993	Israel	3	(0)

Managerial career
- 2007–2008: Hapoel Be'er Sheva (assistant)
- 2009–2010: Hakoah Amidar Ramat Gan (assistant)
- 2010–2011: Maccabi Ironi Netivot
- 2011: Hakoah Amidar Ramat Gan
- 2017: Maccabi Be'er Sheva
- 2018–2019: F.C. Be'er Sheva
- 2024–2025: Hapoel Ashdod
- 2025–: Maccabi Yavne
- * Club domestic league appearances and goals

Stav Elimelech (Hebrew: סתיו אלימלך; born 9 November 1969) is an Israeli former professional footballer that has played in Hapoel Be'er Sheva.

== Honours ==
=== Club ===
Hapoel Beer Sheva

- Premier League:
  - Third place (4):1987/1988, 1993/1994, 1994/1995, 1996/1997
- State Cup:
  - Winners (1): 1996/1997
  - Runners-up (1): 2002/2003
- Toto Cup:
  - Winners (2): 1988/1989, 1995/1996
- Lillian Cup:
  - Winners (1): 1988
- Second League:
  - Winners (1): 1999/2000
