= Beitar Jaffa F.C. =

Israeli football club

Beitar Jaffa
- Full name: Beitar Jaffa Zion Football Club בית״ר יפו ציון
- Founded: 1949
- Ground: Neve Golan Ground, Tel Aviv
- Chairman: Michael Damo
- Manager: Michael Damo
- League: Liga Gimel Tel Aviv
- 2015–16: 6th
Home colours	Away colours

Beitar Jaffa (Hebrew: בית״ר יפו) is an Israeli football club based in Jaffa, Tel Aviv. The club plays in the Liga Gimel Tel Aviv division.

== History ==
The club was founded in 1949, and played mostly in the lower divisions of Israeli football. However, they spent four seasons in the second tier of Israeli football. Beitar have played their first season in Liga Meuhedet, the temporary second tier in the 1949–50 season, where they finished eighth out of nine in the Tel Aviv division, and relegated to Liga Gimel. In the 1954–55 season, the club returned to the second tier, however, they finished second bottom in Liga Bet South division, and relegated to Liga Gimel, the third division at the time, where they played, until the 1961–62 season, in which the club finished bottom in Liga Bet South B division, and relegated to Liga Gimel.

The club returned to Liga Bet in the 1971–72 season. In the 1973–74 season the club topped Liga Bet South A division, and qualified to the promotion play-offs against the South B division winner, Hapoel Ashkelon, the two South divisional runners-up, Hapoel Kfar Shalem and Maccabi Yavne, and the bottom ranked clubs from Liga Alef South, Hapoel Ramla and Maccabi Holon. The club has won the play-offs with three wins and two draws, and was promoted to Liga Alef. The club finished the following season in Liga Alef South at the bottom place, with only 8 points, however, they were reprieved from relegation, after the Israel Football Association decided to expand Liga Leumit to 18 clubs, and Liga Alef to 17 clubs in each division for the following season, where they finished second bottom, and dropped by two levels to Liga Bet, which became the fourth tier of Israeli football, following the creation of Liga Artzit in 1976.

In the 1979–80 season, the club finished bottom in Liga Bet South A division, and relegated to Liga Gimel, (the fifth tier from 1976 to 1999, and the sixth tier from 1999 to 2009). The club returned to Liga Bet in the 2001–02 season, where they played until the 2005–06 season, in which the club finished second bottom in Liga Bet South A division, and relegated to Liga Gimel (now as the fifth and lowest tier), where they play today.

== Honours ==
=== League ===
Honour	No.	Years
Third tier	1	1973–74

=== Cups ===
Honour	No.	Years
Liga Gimel divisional State Cup	1	2012–13
