= A.S. Holon Mor =

Israeli football club

Maccabi Holon
- Full name: Maccabi Holon Football Club מכבי חולון
- Founded: 1945
- Dissolved: 1980
Home colours	Away colours

Maccabi Holon (Hebrew: מכבי חולון) was an Israeli football club based in Holon. The club played five seasons in Liga Alef, then the second tier of Israeli football league system.

== History ==
The Maccabi sport club in Holon was founded in 1942, and the football section was opened 1945, playing mostly in friendlies during its early years.

After the Israeli Declaration of Independence, the club joined Liga Gimel of the Israel Football Association for the 1954–55 season. At the end of the 1959–60 season, Maccabi were promoted to Liga Bet, the third tier of Israeli football at the time, after they finished at the top four of the Promotion play-offs for Liga Gimel clubs. In 1963–64, the club finished runners-up in Liga Bet South B division, and were promoted to Liga Alef for the first time in their history. In 1965–66, the club's second season at the second tier, they reached their best placing ever, which was eighth. In 1968–69, the club finished at the bottom of the South division and relegated back to Liga Bet. After four seasons in Liga Bet, Maccabi won the South A division in the 1972–73 season and made a return to Liga Alef. However, their second spell at Liga Alef lasted only one season, after they finished bottom of the South division in the 1973–74 season, and relegated to Liga Bet after lost all of their five matches in the Relegation play-offs. The club suffered further relegation in the following season, this time to Liga Gimel, after finished bottom of Liga Bet South A division.

The club folded at the summer of 1980, and all of its players were released and were free to join other clubs, mostly for Lazarus Holon. Although the club was re-established in the 1990s, it merged later with Bat Yam clubs, Beitar and Maccabi, to form Maccabi Ironi Bat Yam.

== Honours ==
- Liga Bet:
  - Winners (1): 1972–73
  - Runners-up (1): 1963–64
- Liga Gimel:
  - Winners (1): 1959–60
