= 1975–76 Liga Alef =

Israeli football season

The 1975–76 Liga Alef season was the last in which Liga Alef was the second tier of Israeli football, as at the end of the season, Liga Artzit came into existence, and became the new second tier, Liga Alef became the third tier.

Hapoel Acre (champions of the North Division) and Hapoel Yehud (champions of the South Division) promoted to Liga Leumit, both in the first time in their history.

The eight clubs which placed between second to fifth in each of their respective regional divisions, with the addition of four clubs which have been relegated from Liga Leumit, formed the new Liga Artzit in the following season.

All the other clubs which placed sixth to fifteenth, continued to the new Liga Alef as third tier clubs. the bottom two clubs in each regional division demoted to Liga Bet (new fourth tier).

== North Division ==
Pos	Team	Pld	W	D	L	GF	GA	GD	Pts	Promotion or relegation
1	Hapoel Acre	32	22	5	5	54	19	+35	49	Promoted to Liga Leumit
2	Beitar Netanya	32	19	10	3	45	17	+28	48	Remained at second level
3	Hapoel Ramat Gan	32	18	10	4	49	19	+30	44 (Note: 2 points deducted.)	Remained at second level
4	Maccabi Hadera	32	13	11	8	34	32	+2	37	Remained at second level
5	Hapoel Netanya	32	14	10	8	59	30	+29	36	Remained at second level
6	Maccabi Herzliya	32	9	16	7	31	28	+3	32	Relegated to Liga Alef
7	Hapoel Nahliel	32	9	13	10	31	35	−4	31	Relegated to Liga Alef
8	Hapoel Mahane Yehuda	32	12	7	13	27	31	−4	29	Relegated to Liga Alef
9	Hapoel Tirat HaCarmel	32	6	15	11	36	45	−9	27	Relegated to Liga Alef
10	Hapoel Bnei Nazareth	32	8	11	13	37	49	−12	27	Relegated to Liga Alef
11	Hapoel Safed	32	8	10	14	30	43	−13	26	Relegated to Liga Alef
12	Hapoel Kiryat Shmona	32	9	11	12	42	46	−4	25 (Note: 4 points deducted.)	Relegated to Liga Alef
13	Hapoel Nahariya	32	10	5	17	43	52	−9	25	Relegated to Liga Alef
14	Hapoel Tel Hanan	32	6	13	13	26	44	−18	25	Relegated to Liga Alef
15	Hapoel Herzliya	32	7	10	15	26	39	−13	24	Relegated to Liga Alef
16	Hapoel Tiberias	32	5	13	14	26	48	−22	23	Relegated to Liga Bet
17	Hapoel Kiryat Ata	32	5	12	15	20	39	−19	22	Relegated to Liga Bet

== South Division ==
Pos	Team	Pld	W	D	L	GF	GA	GD	Pts	Promotion or relegation
1	Hapoel Yehud	32	17	11	4	47	21	+26	45	Promoted to Liga Leumit
2	Hapoel Holon	32	16	11	5	45	23	+22	43	Remained at second level
3	Maccabi Sha'arayim	32	15	10	7	29	23	+6	40	Remained at second level
4	Hapoel Rishon LeZion	32	13	12	7	41	21	+20	38	Remained at second level
5	Hapoel Ashdod	32	11	14	7	33	34	−1	36	Remained at second level
6	Hapoel Beit Shemesh	32	12	11	9	40	24	+16	35	Relegated to Liga Alef
7	Beitar Ramla	32	10	11	11	39	44	−5	31	Relegated to Liga Alef
8	Hapoel Bat Yam	32	9	11	12	37	36	+1	29	Relegated to Liga Alef
9	Maccabi HaShikma Ramat Gan	32	10	9	13	36	38	−2	29	Relegated to Liga Alef
10	Beitar Ashdod	32	8	13	11	33	43	−10	29	Relegated to Liga Alef
11	SK Nes Tziona	32	6	17	9	29	41	−12	29	Relegated to Liga Alef
12	Hapoel Dimona	32	5	18	9	29	38	−9	28	Relegated to Liga Alef
13	Hapoel Marmorek	32	8	11	13	36	36	0	27	Relegated to Liga Alef
14	Hapoel Ramla	32	9	9	14	24	36	−12	27	Relegated to Liga Alef
15	Hapoel Be'er Ya'akov	32	9	8	15	32	54	−22	26	Relegated to Liga Alef
16	Beitar Jaffa	32	7	11	14	22	35	−13	25	Relegated to Liga Bet
17	Hapoel Lod	32	7	13	12	36	41	−5	23 (Note: 4 points deducted.)	Relegated to Liga Bet
