= Hapoel Ramla F.C. =

Israeli football club

Hapoel Ramla
- Full name: Hapoel Ramla Football Club הפועל רמלה
- Founded: 1949
- Ground: Ofer Park, Ramla
- Chairman: Moshe Dabush
- League: Liga Gimel
- 2023–24: Liga Gimel Central, 11th
Home colours	Away colours

Hapoel Ramla (Hebrew: הפועל רמלה) is an Israeli football club based in Ramla. They are currently in Liga Gimel Central division, and play home matches at the Ofer Park in Ramla.

== History ==
The club was founded in 1949, and played their first season in Liga Meuhedet, the temporary second tier in the 1949–50 season, where they finished seventh out of nine in the Jerusalem and South division, and relegated to Liga Gimel. In the 1956–57 season, the club reached Liga Bet, the third tier of Israeli football at the time, and placed fourth. In the 1958–59 season the club won Liga Bet South division, and were promoted for the first time to Liga Alef, the second tier of Israeli football at the time. In the 1963–64 season, the club reached their best placing to date, after they finished sixth in Liga Alef South division. However, they were deducted four points that season, following a riot in their match with Hapoel Be'er Sheva, which were rivals with Hapoel Ramla at the time. in the following season, the club relegated to Liga Bet after second bottom finish

In the 1969–70 season, the club finished on top of Liga Bet South B division, but were not promoted, after the Israel Football Association disqualified the club, following suspicion of bribery in their match with Maccabi Dror Lod, which ended 13–0. Afterwards, the club was transferred to South A division of Liga Bet, where they won that division in the 1971–72 season, and were promoted to Liga Alef. In 1976, following the creation of Liga Artzit, Liga Alef became the third tier of Israeli football, where the club continued to play after they finished 14th at the 1975–76 season.

In the 1979–80 season the club missed qualification to the promotion play-offs by a single point, after they were deducted two points, and their city rivals, Beitar Ramla, finished runners-up and qualified instead. In the following season, Hapoel finished runners-up in Liga Alef South and qualified to the promotion play-offs, where they lost on penalties to the Liga Alef North runners-up, Hapoel Tel Hanan, and remained in Liga Alef. In the 1983–84 season, Hapoel escaped relegation, after they had better goal difference than the second bottom club, Ironi Ashdod. In the following season, Hapoel were relegated to Liga Bet. However, they bounced back to Liga Alef after they won Liga Bet South B division in the following season, once again, thanks to a better goal difference than runners-up, Ironi Ashdod. The 1988–89 season was their last in Liga Alef, as they were relegated to Liga Bet, and later suffered further relegation, to Liga Gimel, the fifth and lowest tier of Israeli football.

=== Recent history ===
In the recent years, Hapoel Ramla was known as "The worst team in Israel", since the club used to suffer humiliating defeats in Liga Gimel Central division; according to the club's chairman, Moshe Dabush, "The main thing is to do as much disgrace to Yoel Lavi, and to the city of Ramla, which is under his mayoralty".

In the 2008–09 season, the club conceded 197 goals, with the biggest defeat was 0–15 to Maccabi Kabilio Jaffa; in the 2009–10 season, the club conceded 151 goals, with the biggest defeat was 0–19 to Bnei Yehud; in the 2010–11 season, the club conceded 216 goals, with the biggest defeat was 0–18 to both Maccabi Be'er Ya'akov and F.C. Maccabi Yeruham; and the 2011–12 season was the worst, as the club conceded 227 goals, with the biggest defeat was a record defeat of 0–21 to Ironi Modi'in. during that time, and as a result of the dispute with the Ramla municipality, the club played home matches at the Moshav of Matzliah.

In the 2013–14 season, the club returned to activity after one season hiatus, and became more competitive, as they were topping their division after three matches played. at the end of the season, Hapoel Ramla finished in the sixth place.

== Honours ==
=== League ===
Honour	No.	Years
Third tier	4	1957–58, 1958–59, 1969–70, 1971–72
Fourth tier	2	1955–56, 1985–86
