= Hapoel Kiryat Ata F.C. =

Hapoel Kiryat Ata
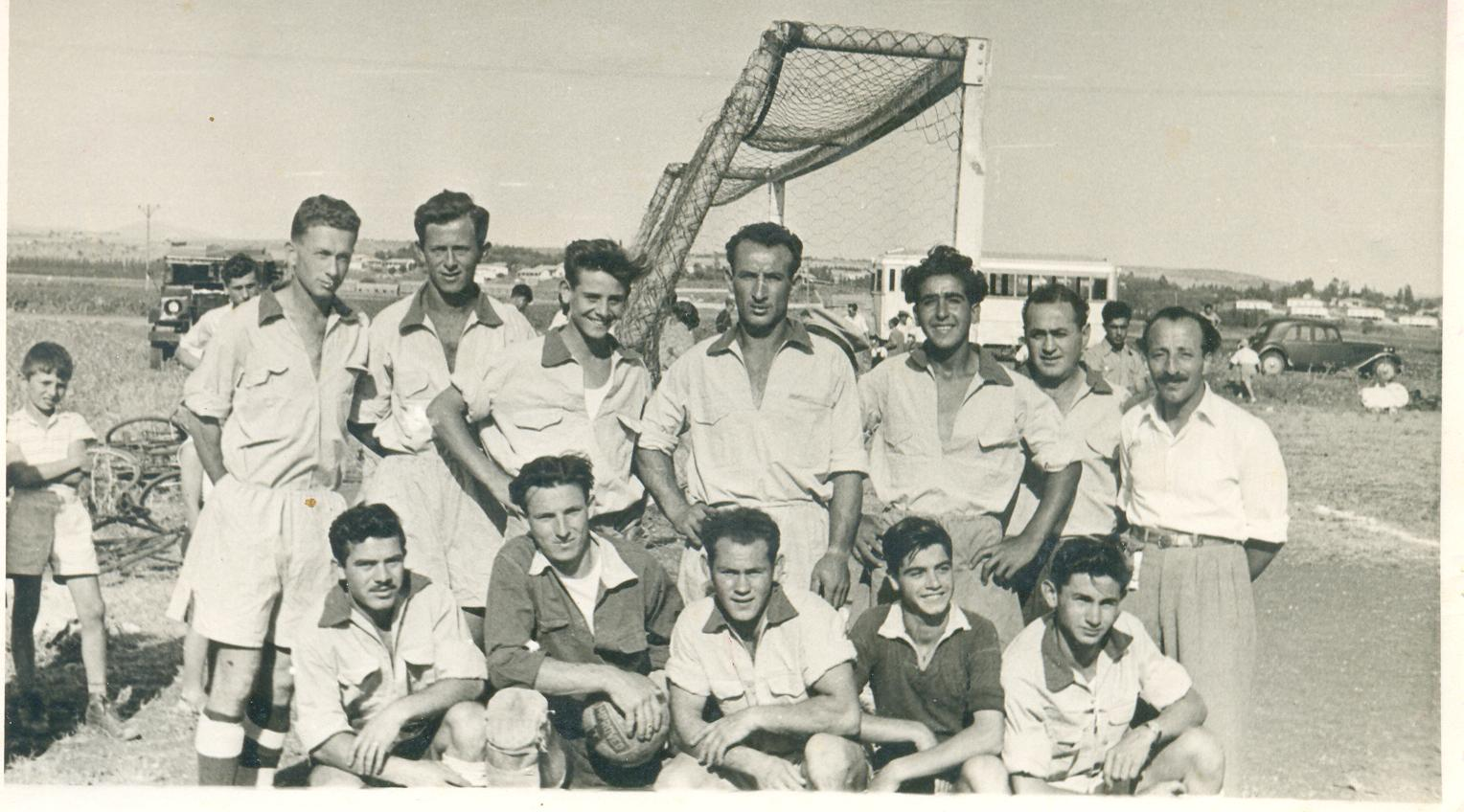
- Hapoel Kfar Ata, 1950
- Full name: Hapoel Kiryat Ata Football Club הפועל קרית אתא
- Founded: 1936; 90 years ago
- Dissolved: 1992; 34 years ago
- Ground: Hapoel Stadium, Kiryat Ata

Hapoel Kiryat Ata (Hebrew: הפועל קרית אתא) was an Israeli football club based in Kiryat Ata.

== History ==
The club was founded in 1936 as Hapoel Kfar Ata and was admitted to the Eretz Israel Football Association in 1938. During its early days, the club played in Haifa regional league, and later in Liga Bet, the second tier of league football in the British Mandate for Palestine. After the Israeli Declaration of Independence, Hapoel played in Liga Meuhedet, the temporary second tier in the 1949–50 season, where they finished third in the North division, and were placed in Liga Bet, the second tier of Israeli football at the time. In the 1951–52 season, the club finished bottom of Liga Bet North division, with only two points, and relegated to Liga Gimel. In 1956–57, the club made a return to Liga Bet, which became the third tier at the previous season, following restructuring of the Israeli football league system.

Prior to the double season of 1966–68, the club was renamed Hapoel Kiryat Ata, following the merger of the village with Kiryat Binyamin, which formed Kiryat Ata. In 1972–73, Hapoel won Liga Bet North A division, and after 16 successive seasons at the third tier, were promoted to Liga Alef. In Liga Alef, after finished 11th and 14th respectively in the 1973–74 and 1974–75 seasons, the club finished bottom of the North division in the 1975–76 season, and dropped by two levels to Liga Bet, which became the fourth tier, following the creation of Liga Artzit. In the 1976–77 season, the club missed out on promotion to Liga Alef by a single point, to Hapoel Tiberias. However, in the following season, Hapoel won Liga Bet North a division and were promoted to Liga Alef, where they played throughout the 1980s, mostly as a mid-table club, until the 1988–89 season, in which the club relegated to Liga Bet. The club relegated even further to Liga Gimel and eventually folded in 1992.

== Honours ==
=== League ===
Honour	No.	Years
Fourth tier	1	1972–73
Fourth tier	2	1955–56^{1}, 1977–78

^{1}As Hapoel Kfar Ata
