= Hapoel Kiryat Yam F.C. =

Former Israeli football club

Hapoel Kiryat Yam
- Full name: Sport Football Club Hapoel Kiryat Yam מועדון ספורט כדורגל הפועל קרית ים
- Founded: 2014; 11 years ago
- Ground: Kiryat Yam Stadium, Kiryat Yam
- Owner: Yuval Alterovich
- Chairman: Dani Alterovich
- Manager: Ya'akov Berenstein
- League: Liga Gimel
- 2020–21: Liga Gimel Samaria, 2nd (folded)
Home colours	Away colours

Sport Football Club Hapoel Kiryat Yam (Hebrew: מועדון ספורט כדורגל הפועל קרית ים), or simply Hapoel Kiryat Yam (Hebrew: הפועל קרית ים), was an Israeli football club based in Kiryat Yam.

== History ==
A previous club named Hapoel Kiryat Yam was founded in 1964, and in its prime, played thirteen seasons in Liga Bet, then the third tier of Israeli football (the fourth tier since 1976), from the 1968–69 season to the 1980–81 season, in which the club was relegated to Liga Gimel.

Another club, named Sport Club Kiryat Yam, or simply F.C. Kiryat Yam, was founded in 2008 and was in existence for only three seasons, until the end of the 2010–11 season, while playing in Liga Gimel.

The final incarnation of the club was founded at the summer of 2014 as Sport Club Kiryat Yam, and registered at the Israel Football Association for the 2014–15 season in Liga Gimel as Sport Football Club Hapoel Kiryat Yam.

== Honours ==
=== League ===
Honour	No.	Years
Fourth tier	1	1966–68^{1}

^{1}Achieved by Hapoel Kiryat Yam F.C.
