= Maccabi Ramat Amidar F.C. =

Maccabi Ramat Amidar
- Full name: Maccabi Ramat Amidar Football Club
- Founded: 1957
- Dissolved: 2005
- Ground: Ramat Amidar Stadium, Ramat Gan
- 2004–05: Liga Artzit, 4th
| Home colours | Away colours |

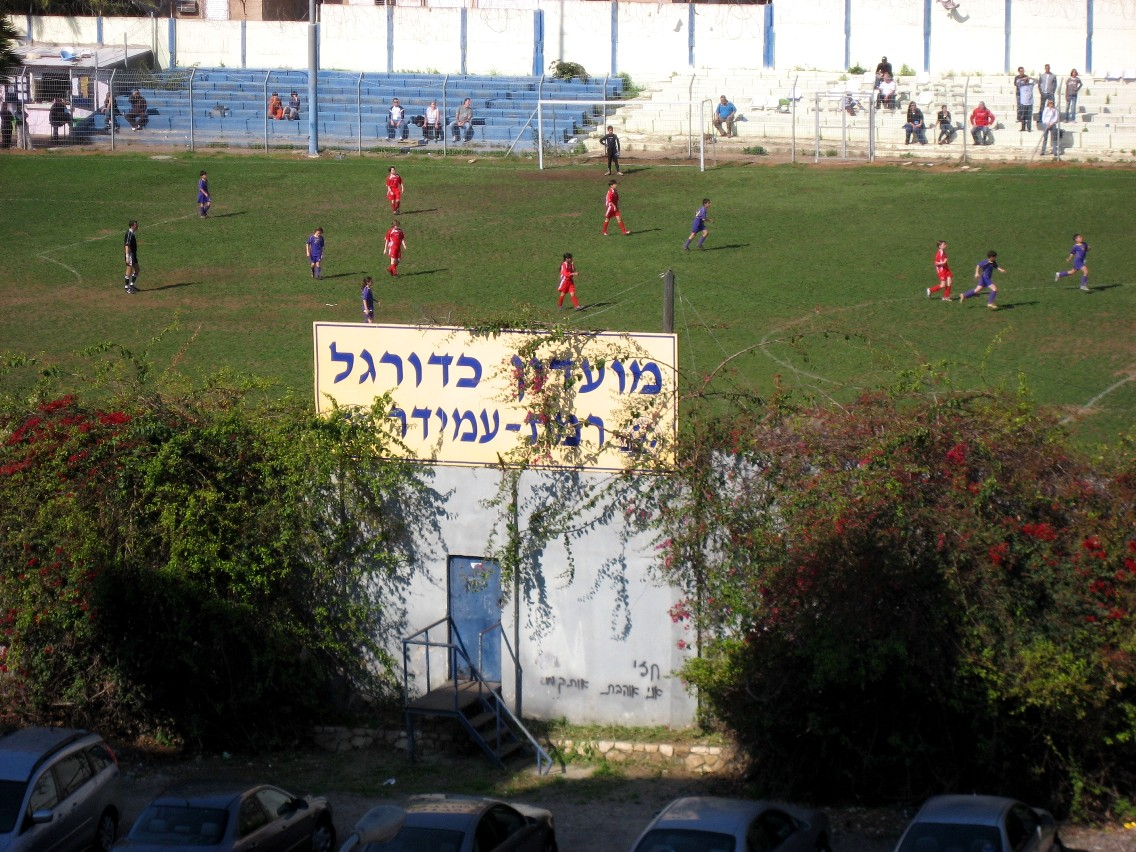

Maccabi Ramat Amidar (Hebrew: מכבי רמת עמידר) was an Israeli football club based in Ramat Gan. The club spent several seasons in the top division in the late 1970s and early 1980s, but in 2005 merged into Hakoah Ramat Gan, which became Hakoah Amidar Maccabi Ramat Gan.

== History ==
The club was founded in 1957 and started in Liga Gimel. After two seasons at the bottom tier, the club was promoted to Liga Bet, as the third tier was expanded to 64 teams. In the 1962–63 season, the club finished runners-up in Liga Bet South A division and was promoted to Liga Alef. After eleven seasons playing in the second tier, including four successive runners-up finishes in 1965–66, 1966–68, 1968–69 and 1969–70, the club won Liga Alef South division in the 1974–75 season and was promoted to Liga Leumit (then the top division) for the first time in their history. However, in their first season in the league, they finished bottom and were relegated back to the second tier. In 1978–79 they finished as runners-up to Hakoah Ramat Gan and were promoted again. After an 11th-placed finish in 1979–80 (a season in which they reached the cup final for the first (and only) time, losing 4–1 to Hapoel Kfar Saba), they finished second from bottom in 1980–81 and were relegated back to Liga Artzit.

At the end of the 1982–83 season they finished third in Liga Artzit and were promoted back to the top division. However, they were relegated again at the end of the following season. At the 1990–91 season the club had been relegated into the third tier, and due to league restructuring, dropped into the fourth tier in 1999.

In the 2001–02 season, they won the South Division of Liga Alef to return to the third division. The following season they finished third, a place below the promotion positions. At the end of the 2004–05 season the club left the league and merged into Hakoah Ramat Gan.

== Notable players ==
- Eli Cohen (born 1951)
- Vicky Peretz (1953–2021), international footballer

== Notable managers ==
- Eli Cohen (born 1951)
