= Beitar Ashdod F.C. =

Israeli football club

Beitar Ashdod
- Full name: Beitar Ashdod בית"ר אשדוד
- Founded: 1962; 2016 (re-founded)
- Dissolved: 1981
- Ground: Synthetic Pitch, Ashdod
- Owner: Amihay Avitan
- Chairman: Yossi Knafo
- Manager: Ezra Elbaz
- League: Liga Gimel
- 2023–24: Liga Bet South, 17 (relegated)

Beitar Ashdod (Hebrew: בית"ר אשדוד) is an Israeli football club based in Ashdod. Beitar participated in the second division in the 1970s. In 1981 merged with Maccabi Ashdod to form Maccabi Ironi Ashdod in 1981. In summer 2016, the club was refounded in Liga Gimel.

== History ==
The club was founded in the early sixties. In the 1969–70 season it was promoted to Liga Bet for the first time in its history. In 1975–76 season, Beitar hosted the first Ashdod derby against Hapoel Ashdod which ended in a 2–2 draw in front of 4000 fans. In September 1981, the club merged with Maccabi Ashdod to form Ironi Ashdod.

6 years later, Beitar members founded "Beitar Nativ Ashdod". And play in liga gimel. In 1993/94 season, the teem Promotion to liga bet. The club was dismantled in 1999.

On 31 July 2016 the club refounded in Liga Gimel and was assigned to the Center District.
