= Hapoel Merhavim F.C. =

Israeli football club

Hapoel Merhavim
- Full name: Hapoel Merhavim Football Club הפועל מרחבים
- Founded: 1957
- Ground: Merhavim Ground, Merhavim Regional Council
- Chairman: Erez Sharon
- Manager: Avi Kalif
- League: Liga Bet South B
- 2014–15: 5th
| Home colours | Away colours |

Hapoel Merhavim (Hebrew: הפועל מרחבים) is an Israeli football club based in Merhavim Regional Council. The club is currently in Liga Bet South B division.

== History ==
The club was founded in 1957, and reached Liga Bet, the third tier of Israeli football at the time in the 1959–60 season, which was the first season Liga Bet consisted four regional divisions. The club relegated to Liga Gimel after bottom finish in Liga Bet South B division in the 1964–65 season.

The club made a return to Liga Bet in the 1969–70 season, and after another relegation in the 1970–71 season, the club made an immediate return to Liga Bet, and started their best period to date, after fourth-place finish in the 1972–73 season, and third-place finish in the 1974–75 season, six points short from promotion to the second tier of Israeli football. The club also made an upset in the 1972–73 Israel State Cup, after they eliminated Bnei Yehuda Tel Aviv by a result of 3–2 in away match.

Following the creation of Liga Artzit in 1976, Merhavim became a fourth tier club, and played most of their seasons in Liga Bet. The club returned to the third tier, this time to Liga Alef, after they achieved promotion in the 1993–94 season. they were relegated back to Liga Bet at the end of the 1995–96 season.

The club relegated to Liga Gimel, the fifth and lowest tier of Israeli football in the 2012–13 season, after losing in the relegation play-offs to F.C. Dimona and Tzeirei Rahat. However, they made an immediate return to Liga Bet, after winning Liga Gimel South division in the 2013–14 season.

== Honours ==
=== League ===
| Honour | No. | Years |
|---|---|---|
| Fourth Tier | 3 | 1968–69, 1971–72, 1993–94 |
| Fifth tier | 2 | 1988–89, 2013–14 |
