= Maccabi Yavne F.C. =

Israeli football club

Maccabi "Zvi" Yavne
- Full name: Maccabi "Zvi" Yavne Football Club
- Founded: 1962
- Ground: Jackie Levy Stadium, Yavne
- Capacity: 2,500
- Chairman: Shuki Nagar
- Manager: Stav Elimelech
- League: Liga Alef South
- 2024–25: Liga Alef South, 4th of 16
Home colours	Away colours

Maccabi "Zvi" Yavne (Hebrew: מכבי יבנה) is an Israeli football club based in Yavne. They currently play in Liga Alef.

== History ==
The club was founded in 1962 and played in Liga Gimel, the lowest tier of Israeli football, up until the 1971–72 season, when they started their progress and reached Liga Bet for the first time. In the 1975–76 season, they won Liga Bet South B division and were promoted to Liga Alef. Four seasons later, in the 1979–80 season, they won Liga Alef South division and were promoted to Liga Artzit, the second tier of Israeli football at the time. After a 9th-place finish in their debut season in the second tier, they finished 3rd in the 1981–82 season and were promoted to Liga Leumit (then the top division) for the first time in their history. In 1985, they won the Toto Cup, beating Beitar Jerusalem 2–1 in the final. After several lower-mid table finishes, Maccabi were relegated at the end of the 1986–87 season in which they finished 14th.

Maccabi narrowly missed out on a return to the top division, on goal difference, in 1989–90, when they finished third, level on points with second-placed Hapoel Tel Aviv. In the following season they were promoted, but were relegated at the end of the 1991–92 season, having finished second bottom.

After a narrow escape in the 1996–97 season, in which they finished one place and one point above the relegation zone, Maccabi were relegated to Liga Alef (then the third tier) at the end of the 1997–98 season, in which they won only one match and gained eight points throughout the entire season. Due to league restructuring, at the end of the following season, they dropped into the fourth tier.

In 2000–01 Maccabi won the South Division of Liga Alef and were promoted back to Liga Artzit. However, they finished bottom of the league in 2001–02 and were relegated back to Liga Alef. At the end of the 2011–12 season, Maccabi beat Hapoel Asi Gilboa on away goals (2–2 on aggregate) in the promotion playoff final and were promoted to Liga Leumit. In the 2015–16 season, the club finished second bottom in Liga Leumit and was relegated to Liga Alef.

== Current squad ==
As of 5 November 2024

No.	Pos.	Nation	Player
1	GK	ISR	Palay Mesika
2	DF	ISR	Avishay Sanker
3	DF	ISR	Ido Cohen
4	DF	ISR	Ofir Taykin
5	MF	ISR	Abdel Rahman Hamouda
6	DF	ISR	Saig Ben Hananya
7	FW	ISR	Amit Maneisko
8	MF	ISR	Shaked Carrillo
9	FW	ISR	Tauderos Asmalesh
10	FW	ISR	Niv Mizrahi
11	FW	ISR	Omer Buaron
14	DF	ISR	Guy Mishpati

No.	Pos.	Nation	Player
15	MF	ISR	Dudu Edri
16	MF	ISR	Yuval Haliva
17	MF	ISR	Raz Amir
18	MF	ISR	Shalev Maimon
19	MF	ISR	Shaked Navon
21	DF	ISR	Liad Nevet
26	DF	ISR	Or Zuzut
27	DF	ISR	Adi Mundia
55	GK	ISR	Dudi Alon
77	FW	ISR	Ido Exbard
98	MF	ISR	Omer Lakao
—	MF	ISR	Ron Levi

== Honours ==
=== Cups ===
- Toto Cup
  - Winners 1984–85

=== League ===
- Second Division:
  - Runners-up 1988–89, 1990–91
- Third Division:
  - Champions 1975–76, 1979–80, 2011–12
  - Runners-up 1972–73, 1973–74, 1974–75, 1976–77
- Fourth Division:
  - Champions 1970–71, 2000–01

== Former notable managers ==
- Rafi Cohen (born 1965)
