= Hapoel Yeruham F.C. =

Israeli football club

Hapoel Yeruham
- Full name: Hapoel Yeruham Football Club
- Founded: 1958; 2012 (Refounded)
- Dissolved: 2005; 2023
- Ground: Municipal Stadium, Yeruham
- Capacity: 800
- Chairman: Arie Dukarker
- Manager: Nir Barad
- League: Liga Bet South B
- 2023–24: Liga Bet South B, 8th
- Website: http://www.hapoel-yeruham.co.il/
Home colours	Away colours

Hapoel Yeruham (Hebrew: הפועל ירוחם) is an Israeli football club based in Yeruham. The club is currently in Liga Bet South B division.

== History ==
The club was founded in 1958 as Hapoel Kfar Yeruham and became Hapoel Yeruham in 1962, after the town's name was changed to Yeruham. The club have reached Liga Bet, which was the third tier of Israeli football at the time, for the first time in the 1971–72 season. Hapoel Yeruham remained four seasons in Liga Bet until relegation in the 1974–75 season. Hapoel Yeruham returned to the third tier (now Liga Alef), after they won Liga Bet South B division in the 1980–81 season and played six seasons in Liga Alef South division, until they finished bottom in the 1986–87 season and relegated to Liga Bet. By the 1989–90 season, Hapoel Yeruham were dropped to Liga Gimel, the fifth and lowest tier of Israeli football. Nevertheless, the club made history after they became the first and only Liga Gimel club to reach the Quarter-finals of the Israel State Cup, after a sensational six goal hammering of Hapoel Lod in the 1/8 finals of the 1989–90 Israel State Cup. In the Quarter-finals, Hapoel Yeruham were narrowly beaten 0–1 in both home and away legs by top flight club, Hapoel Be'er Sheva.

By the mid-1990s the club had returned to Liga Alef. In the 1994–95 season, they finished sixth in Liga Alef South and hosted the Israeli champions of that season, Maccabi Tel Aviv in the 1/16 finals of the Israel State Cup, in front of 2,500 spectators at the Yeruham Municipal Stadium. Hapoel Yeruham were beaten by a result of 0–3. Hapoel Yeruham remained in Liga Alef until the 1998–99 season, where they finished second bottom and relegated to Liga Bet. The club did not return to Liga Alef ever since and folded after the 2004–05 season as a result of major financial problems.

In 2010, football returned to Yeruham, as F.C. Maccabi Yeruham was founded. the club played two seasons in Liga Gimel Central-South division, until the 2011–12 season. In the following season, F.C. Hapoel Yeruham replaced F.C. Maccabi Yeruham in Liga Gimel Central-South division and returned to Israeli football after seven years.

In the 2013–14 season, the club have won the Israel State Cup for Liga Gimel South division, following a victory of 1–0 against Maccabi Ashkelon. The club repeated the feat in the following season, following a victory of 4–3 against Maccabi Segev Shalom.

In the 2016–17 season, the club have won again the Israel State Cup for Liga Gimel South division, following a victory of 4–0 against F.C. Arad. at the end of the season, the club Promoted to liga bet (From the first place). On 5 December 2023 the club stop his activity

== Honours ==
=== League ===
Honour	No.	Years
Fourth tier	2	1964–65, 1965–66, 1980–81

=== Cups ===
Honour	No.	Years
Liga Gimel South Division Cup	3	2013–14, 2014–15, 2016–17
