= Ironi Nesher F.C. =

Israeli football club

Ironi Nesher
- Full name: Ironi Nesher Football Club עירוני נשר
- Founded: 1954; 71 years ago (as Hapoel Tel Hanan); 2009; 16 years ago (as Ironi Nesher)
- Ground: Nesher Stadium, Nesher
- Capacity: 2,500
- Chairman: (Israel) Emil Yosifov
- Manager: (Israel) Oren Flash
- League: Liga Alef North
- 2024–25: Liga Alef North, 11th of 16
Home colours	Away colours

Ironi Nesher (Hebrew: עירוני נשר) is an Israeli football club based in Nesher. They are currently in Liga Alef and play home matches at the Nesher Stadium.

== History ==
The club was founded in 2009 as a successor to Hapoel Tel Hanan, which was founded in 1954 and dissolved in 2009. Hapoel Tel Hanan was based in the Tel Hanan neighborhood of Nesher, and spent three seasons in the second tier of Israeli football, first in the 1975–76 season, where they were placed 14th in Liga Alef Northern division, and later in the new second tier at the time, Liga Artzit, where they were placed 13th in the 1981–82 season, and finished bottom in the following season and relegated to Liga Alef. their last season as Hapoel Tel Hanan was 2008–09, in the Samaria division of Liga Gimel, the lowest tier of Israeli football, where they finished in the eighth place.

The new club, Ironi Nesher, started the following season at the same division in Liga Gimel. Although they finished in the third place, they were eventually promoted to Liga Bet North B division, after one spot was vacated in this league, as Maccabi Beit She'an dissolved.

In the 2013–14 season, the club won Liga Bet North B division, and was promoted to Liga Alef.

In the 2014–15 season, the club finished runners-up in Liga Alef North division, and qualified for the Promotion play-offs. After beating Hapoel Migdal HaEmek 4–3 on penalties (after 2–2) in the first round and Hapoel Beit She'an 2–1 in the second round, Ironi Nesher won 1–0 against the Liga Alef South play-off winner, Beitar Kfar Saba, and stood 180 minutes away from promotion to Liga Leumit, when they faced the 14th placed in 2014–15 Liga Leumit, Hapoel Nazareth Illit. Ironi Nesher lost 1–5 on aggregate (0–5, 1–0) and remained in Liga Alef.

In the 2015–16 season, the club won Liga Alef North division and promoted to Liga Leumit.

== Current squad ==
As to 28 November 2024

No.	Pos.	Nation	Player
2	DF	ISR	Daniel Dadon
5	DF	ISR	Akram Shreh
6	MF	ISR	Loay Shaban
7	MF	ISR	Omer Turgeman
8	FW	ISR	Qasem Najar
9	FW	ISR	Ezaat Khalaila
10	FW	ISR	Odai Shalata
11	MF	ISR	Yagel Peretz
13	MF	ISR	Omer Shmuel
14	MF	ISR	Inalem Abraham
15	MF	ISR	Sahar Sheto
17	DF	ISR	Zein Al-Din Shalata
18	DF	ISR	Niran Megira

No.	Pos.	Nation	Player
21	DF	ISR	Shalev Ben Muha
24	MF	ISR	Ryan Halabi
29	FW	ISR	Sapir Razon
44	GK	ISR	Ori Ben Shushan
55	GK	ISR	Moshe Lankri
77	MF	ISR	Shalev Valerstein
87	DF	ISR	Ibrahim Agbaria
99	MF	ISR	Yagel Dahan
—	DF	ISR	Shay Elgrabli
—	DF	ISR	Erez Hasson
—	MF	ISR	Lior Dahan
—	MF	ISR	Ofir Mizrahi
—	FW	ISR	Amit Amzaleg

== Honours ==
=== League ===
Honour	No.	Years
Third tier	2	1974–75^{1}, 2015–16
Fourth tier	1	2013–14
Fifth tier	1	1998–99^{1}

^{1}Achieved by Hapoel Tel Hanan.
