= Beitar Ramla F.C. =

Beitar Ramla
- Full name: Beitar Ramla Football Club
- Founded: 1951
- Dissolved: 1999
- Ground: Municipal Stadium, Ramla
- 1998–99: Liga Alef South, 16th (relegated)
Home colours	Away colours

Beitar Ramla (Hebrew: בית"ר רמלה) was an Israeli football club based in Ramla.

== History ==
The club was founded in 1951 and spent twenty seasons in the second tier of Israeli football, twelve in Liga Alef and eight in Liga Artzit, which became the second tier in 1976.

The club was promoted to Liga Bet In 1959, as the third tier was expanded to 64 teams. In the 1962–63 season, Beitar finished runners-up in Liga Bet South B division and were promoted to Liga Alef. The club's best placing in the second tier, was the third place in Liga Alef South division, which was achieved in the 1964–65 season. In 1976, following the creation of Liga Artzit, Liga Alef became the third tier of Israeli football, where the club continued to play after they finished seventh at the 1975–76 season. Beitar returned to the second tier at the end of the 1979–80 season, where they finished runners-up in the South division, and qualified for the promotion play-offs, where they beat Hapoel Ramat Hasharon 2–1 on aggregate (0–0, 2–1). After seven successive seasons in Liga Artzit, Beitar were relegated to Liga Alef at the end of the 1986–87 season, after finished third bottom. Although Beitar made an immediate return to Liga Artzit, they were relegated again in 1988–89 after finished bottom of the league. Beitar did not return to the second tier ever since.

The club played in Liga Alef until the 1998–99 season, in which they withdrew from the league fifteen matches into the season. Their results were expunged and all matches awarded as 2–0 wins to the opposition. As a result, the club finished bottom of the league with zero points, and were due to be relegated to Liga Bet for the 1999–2000 season. However, the Israel Football Association suspended them from playing, and they did not compete in the league.

At the start of the 1999–2000 season, a successor club, Ironi Ramla, was formed and joined Liga Gimel. In 2011 Ironi Ramla merged with Liga Leumit club, Beitar Tel Aviv, to form Beitar Tel Aviv Ramla.
