= Liga Gimel =

- Organising body: Israel Football Association
- Founded: 1951; 75 years ago
- Country: Israel
- Number of clubs: 87 (9-14 teams in 8 Districts
- Level on pyramid: 5
- Promotion to: Liga Bet
- Domestic cup: Israel State Cup
- International cup: UEFA Europa League (via FA Cup)
- Current champions: F.C. Hapeol Yarka (Upper Galilee); Maccabi Isfiya (Bay Area); Hapoel Giv'at Olga (Jezreel); F.C. Ironi Ariel (Samaria); Bnei Yehud 1928 (Dan); Maccabi Ramat HaSharon (Tel Aviv); Beitar Mevaseret Zion Oz (Center); F.C. Maccabi Ashkelon (South)

Liga Gimel (Hebrew: ליגה ג׳, lit. League C) is, since 2009, the fifth and bottom division of Israeli Football League. From Liga Alef and downwards, including Liga Gimel, each league is separated by region.

== History ==
Liga Gimel was first established in 1951 as a third division, below Liga Alef and Liga Bet. In 1955, after designating the first tier as Liga Leumit, Liga Gimel was demoted to the fourth tier. Further demotions followed in 1976, after the second tier Liga Artzit to the fifth tier and in 1999, after the establishment of Liga Ha'Al to the sixth tier. At the end of the 2008–09 season, Liga Artzit was scrapped and Liga Gimel was brought up back to the fifth tier.

Since its establishment Liga Gimel was divided into geographical divisions, to lower operating costs for the clubs, the number of which changed according to the number of club which registered, with as many as 16 divisions in the 1966–68 season. During this period promotion to Liga Bet alternated between direct promotion and through promotion play-offs, which were used to set eight teams for promotion. Following the establishment of Liga Dalet, in 1969, Liga Gimel were divided into 8 divisions, from which one team was promoted directly to Liga Bet and one relegated to Liga Dalet. After the dissolution of Liga Dalet, in 1985, and until the end of the 2001–02 season, the league was divided into 12 divisions, with promotion playoffs.

Although currently Liga Gimel is the bottom tier in the Israeli league pyramid, from 1969–70 and up until the 1984-85 season a further tier, Liga Dalet was below Liga Gimel, until it was scrapped due to declining number of teams.

== Structure ==
Since the 2013–14 season, Liga Gimel consists of eight divisions, four in the northern district and four in the southern district. Each league may contain between 12 and 16 clubs.

The top club from each division is promoted at the end of the season to Liga Bet (the fourth level). Teams are assigned to their new Liga Bet divisions based on their geographical locations, with each of two division feeding to its corresponding Liga Bet division (Upper Galilee and Lower Galilee to Liga Bet North A, Jezreel and Samaria to North B, Sharon and Tel Aviv to South A and Center and South to South B). The second and third placed teams in each division enter a promotion/relegation play-off, at the end of which four teams from Liga Gimel meet the loser of the Liga Bet relegation play-off match (between the 13th and 14th placed team in their corresponding division) for a place in Liga Bet. As it is the lowest division, no clubs are relegated.

== Current members ==
Upper Galilee	Bay Area	Jezreel	Samaria
C.C. Golan/Katzrin	Atletico Shefa-Amr	Ahva Kafr Qara	Beitar Nes Tubruk
F.C. Bnei Beit Jann Rani	Beitar Kiryat Ata Kfir	Beitar Pardes Hanna	Bnei Tira
F.C. Kabul	Bnei Daburiyya	Bnei Umm al-Fahm Hilal	F.C. Kafr Qasim Nibrass
Hapoel Bnei Deir al-Asad	F.C. Al-Nahada Nazareth	F.C. Ihud Qalansawe	F.C. Tayibe
Hapoel Bnei Peki'in	F.C. Carmel Haifa	F.C. Pardes Hanna-Karkur Lior Boker	Hapoel Oranit Ido Aguzi
Hapoel Hurfeish	F.C. Kfar Kama	Hapoel Bnei Jisr az-Zarqa	Hapoel Pardesiya Noam
Ihud Bnei Majd al-Krum	F.C. Kiryat Haim	Hapoel Ein as-Sahla	Maccabi HaSharon Netanya Victor Atia
Maccabi Sektzia Ma'alot-Tarshiha	Hapoel Kafr Misr	Hapoel Mu'awiya	Maccabi Oranit
Tzeirei Sakhnin	Hapoel Kiryat Haim Leibovich	Maccabi Barkai	Maccabi Tzeiri Qalansawe
-	Hapoel Tzirei Nazareth	Maccabi Ironi Barta'a	Shimshon Tayibe
-	Maccabi Ahva Fureidis	Maccabi Ironi Jatt	-

Dan	Center	Tel Aviv	South
Elitzur Yehud Yotel	Bnei Ein Naqquba	Beitar Ezra	Bnei Yeruham Almog Dadon
F.C. Bnei Ra'anana Uzi Cohen	Bnei Ramla	Beitar Jaffa Tzion	F.C. Be'er Sheva
F.C. Bnei Tzion Petah Tikva	F.C. Ashdod City	Elitzur Jaffa Tel Aviv	F.C. Be'er Sheva Shua Tal
F.C. Gissin Petah Tikva	F.C. Be'er Ya'akov Solomon	F.C. Dizngoff Tel Aviv	F.C. Hapoel Bnei Hura
F.C. Kiryat Ono	F.C. Ness Ziona	F.C. Ironi Or Yehuda	F.C. Lehavim Ben Cohen
Hakoach Galei Gil Ramat Gan	F.C. Neve Shalom Lod	F.C. Rishon LeZion	Hapoel Rahat
Ironi Rosh HaAyin	Maccabi Gan Yavne	F.C. Tel Aviv Tommy	Maccabi Bnei Hura
Maccabi Giv'at Shmuel	Maccabi Kiryat Ekron Asher	Hapoel Neve Golan	Otzma Be'er Sheva
Maccabi HaShikma Ramat Hen	Maccabi Sha'arayim	Hapoel Ramat Yisrael	Tzeirei Lakiya
Maccabi Ironi Or Yehuda	-	Hapoel Tzafririm Holon	-
Maccabi Pardes Katz	-	Ironi Herzliya	-
Maccabi Spartak Ramat Gan	-	Maccabi Azor	-
Maccabi Yehud-Monosson	-	Maccabi Ironi Bat Yam Miki Solomovich	-
Shikun Vatikim Ramat Gan	-	Sporting Tel Aviv	-

== Defunct division champions (since 1996–97) ==
Western Galilee

- 1996–97: Hapoel Kabul
- 1998–99: Maccabi Ironi Shlomi
- 1999–2000: Hapoel Maghar
- 2000-2001:Hapoel Karmiel
- 2003-04: Hapoel Bnei Julis
- 2004-05: Beitar Ihud Mashhad

Bay Area

- 1996–97: Ironi I'billin
- 1998–99: Hapoel Kaukab
- 1999–2000: Hapoel Bnei Manda

Haifa

- 1996–97: Hapoel Daliyat al-Karmel
- 1998–99: Hapoel Tel Hanan
- 1999–2000: Maccabi Tzur Shalom

Gush Dan

- 1996–97: Hapoel Jaljulia
- 1997–98: Hapoel Mahane Yehuda
- 1998–99: Maccabi Bnei Tira
- 1999–2000: Maccabi Yehud
