= 1966–67 Israel State Cup =

Tournament details
- Country: Israel

Final positions
- Champions: Maccabi Tel Aviv (13th Title)
- Runners-up: Hapoel Tel Aviv

The 1966–67 Israel State Cup (Hebrew: גביע המדינה, Gvia HaMedina) was the 28th season of Israel's nationwide football cup competition and the 13th after the Israeli Declaration of Independence.

The competition started on 17 September 1966 with Liga Bet and Liga Gimel clubs. Liga Alef clubs joined the competition in the fourth round, played on 10 December 1966 and Liga Leumit entered in the sixth round, on 18 February 1967.

Later rounds, starting from the seventh round, which was due to be played on 15 April 1967 and up to the final, were delayed due to Israel youth team involvement in the 1967 AFC Youth Championship, and later due to the Six-Day War (including the preceding waiting period), and the competition was completed at the start of the following season.

For the fifth time since the establishment of the competition, and the first time since 1941 (and since the Israeli Declaration of Independence), Maccabi Tel Aviv and Hapoel Tel Aviv met in the final, Maccabi winning 2–1 to collect its 13th cup.

== Results ==
=== Third round ===
Home team	Score	Away team
Hapoel Tel Hanan	2–1	Maccabi Pardes Hanna
Beitar Kiryat Tiv'on	0–1	Hapoel Kiryat Ata
Al-Amal Acre	0–0 (a.e.t.); 3–2 p.	Maccabi Nahariya
Hapoel Migdal HaEmek	3–2	Hapoel Kiryat Tiv'on
Beitar Dov Netanya	3–2	Hapoel Sde Nahum
Hapoel Tel Mond	2–6	Hapoel Givat Haim
Hapoel Kiryat Shmona	2–1	Beitar Kiryat Shmona
Maccabi Fureidis	3–2	Hapoel Tirat HaCarmel
Moadon HaPiryon Shefa-'Amr	w/o	Hapoel Shefayim
F.S. Netiv HaShayara	0–2	Beitar Nahariya
Beitar Binyamina	1–2	Hapoel Beit Eliezer
Maccabi Amidar Netanya	3–4	Hapoel Afula
Hapoel Afikim	w/o	Hapoel Elyachin
Shimshon Nahariya	7–1	Hapoel Kadima
Hapoel Neot Mordechai	w/o	Hapoel Kfar HaNassi
S.C. Even Yehuda	w/o	Beitar Migdal HaEmek
Beitar Holon	1–2	Hapoel Yehud

Home team	Score	Away team
Maccabi Kiryat Malakhi	0–4	Maccabi Haim Rehovot
Hapoel Shikun HaMizrach	w/o	Beitar Dimona
Hapoel Bnei Zion	6–0	Beitar Ofakim
Hapoel Qalansawe	w/o	Beitar Harari Bat Yam
Maccabi Montefiore	0–4	Maccabi Be'er Sheva
Hapoel Azor	w/o (Note: Hapoel Azor originally won the match 2–0.)	Hapoel Ganei Tikva
Hapoel HaTzafon Tel Aviv	3–3 (a.e.t.) ?–? p.	Hapoel Rosh HaAyin
Hapoel Merhavim	4–2	S.C. Ein Ya'akov
Hapoel Kiryat Malakhi	5–2	Maccabi Beit Shemesh
Hapoel Rehovot	7–2	F.S. Be'er Sheva
Hapoel Sderot	1–2	Hapoel Shimshon Beit Shemesh
Maccabi Ashdod	1–3	Maccabi Ramat Gan
Hapoel Ramla	6–3	Hapoel Ashdod
Beitar Yehud	1–2	Hapoel Gvar'am/Yad Mordechai
Maccabi Ever HaYarkon	w/o (Note: Maccabi Ever HaYarkon originally won the match 1–0.)	Hapoel Or Yehuda

=== Fourth round ===
Liga Alef clubs entered the competition in this round. The IFA arranged the draw so each Liga Alef clubs wouldn't be drawn to play each other.

Home team	Score	Away team
Maccabi Haim Rehovot	1–9	Hapoel Kfar Saba
Hapoel Nahariya	0–1	Hapoel Kiryat Shmona
Hapoel Ganei Tikva	1–0	Beitar Netanya
Hapoel Herzliya	8–1	Hapoel Ramla
Hapoel Beit Eliezer	w/o	Hapoel Kiryat Haim
Hapoel Tiberias	5–2	Hapoel Bnei Zion
Moadon HaPiryon Shefa-'Amr	0–5	Hapoel Hadera
Hapoel Nahliel	9–0	Hapoel Kfar HaNassi
Beitar Nahariya	0–1	Hapoel Kfar Blum
Hapoel Merhavim	2–3	Hapoel Ra'anana
Hapoel Netanya	1–0	Maccabi Ramat Gan
Hapoel Yehud	2–2 (a.e.t.); 5–3 p.	Hapoel Safed
Maccabi Fureidis	2–3	Hapoel Bnei Nazareth
Maccabi Petah Tikva	3–0	Hapoel Shimshon Beit Shemesh
Maccabi Hadera	5–2	Hapoel Afula
S.C. Even Yehuda	1–2	Hapoel Rishon LeZion

Home team	Score	Away team
Beitar Lod	2–1	Hapoel Rosh HaAyin
Beitar Dov Netanya	w/o	Maccabi Holon
Beitar Ramla	7–0	Hapoel Kiryat Malakhi
Hapoel Tel Hanan	0–1	Hapoel Ashkelon
Hapoel Kiryat Ono	w/o	Hapoel Migdal HaEmek
Hapoel Or Yehuda	2–1 (a.e.t.)	Beitar Be'er Sheva
Hapoel Lod	6–0	Hapoel Gvar'am/Yad Mordechai
Hapoel Shikun HaMizrach	3–0	Hapoel Holon
Beitar Tel Aviv	4–1 (a.e.t.)	Hapoel Givat Haim
Shimshon Nahariya	4–3	Beitar Kiryat Ono
Hapoel Afikim	2–2 (a.e.t.); 2–3 p.	Maccabi Ramat Amidar
Hapoel Marmorek	2–0	Al-Amal Acre
Maccabi Be'er Sheva	0–6	Beitar Jerusalem
Hapoel Be'er Ya'akov	w/o	Hapoel Kiryat Ata
Hapoel Kfar Shalem	3–0	Hapoel Qalansawe
Hapoel Rehovot	2–1	Hapoel Acre

=== Fifth round ===
Home team	Score	Away team
Hapoel Ganei Tikva	2–1	Hapoel Lod
Beitar Jerusalem	3–1	Hapoel Rishon LeZion
Hapoel Kiryat Haim	3–0	Beitar Ramla
Maccabi Petah Tikva	4–0	Hapoel Netanya
Maccabi Ramat Amidar	5–1	Hapoel Nahliel
Maccabi Hadera	3–2	Hapoel Tiberias
Hapoel Kiryat Ono	3–2	Hapoel Kfar Blum
Hapoel Marmorek	4–3	Beitar Lod
Hapoel Kfar Saba	8–0	Hapoel Yehuda
Hapoel Herzliya	5–1	Hapoel Kiryat Shmona
Hapoel Ra'anana	2–1 (a.e.t.)	Hapoel Be'er Ya'akov
Hapoel Ashkelon	2–1	Hapoel Or Yehuda
Hapoel Bnei Nazareth	4–2	Hapoel Rehovot
Hapoel Hadera	4–0	Beitar Dov Netanya
Hapoel Kfar Shalem	3–0	Hapoel Shikun HaMizrach
Beitar Tel Aviv	1–0	Shimshon Nahariya

=== Sixth Round ===
Liga Leumit clubs entered the competition in this round. The IFA arranged the draw so each Liga Leumit clubs wouldn't be drawn to play each other.

15 February 1967 (Note: The match was played three days ahead of schedule since Maccabi Haifa was due to play Slavia Prague on 18 February 1967.)	Maccabi Haifa	2–0	Maccabi Hadera	Haifa Municipal Stadium
	Shmulevich 13' (pen.); Hirsch 68'			Attendance: 3000; Referee: Arye

18 February 1967	Hapoel Kiryat Haim	0–4	Maccabi Tel Aviv	Maccabiah Stadium
			Spiegel 25', 85'; Talbi 68', 76'	Attendance: 1000; Referee: Mizrahi

18 February 1967	Shimshon Tel Aviv	0–0 (a.e.t.); 3–4 p.	Maccabi Petah Tikva
				Attendance: 2000; Referee: Haim Cohen

18 February 1967	Hapoel Petah Tikva	3–0	Maccabi Ramat Amidar
	Sa'id 15'; Hayek 28'; Sharabi 68'			Attendance: 5000; Referee: Barabash

18 February 1967	Hapoel Kiryat Ono	4–0 (Note: The match was abandoned at the 88th minute after a spectator burst to the field at hit the referee. The result stood.)	Maccabi Sha'arayim
	Marcheviak 5'; Green 57', 75'; Ben Harush 77'			Attendance: 1500; Referee: Maymon

18 February 1967	Hapoel Marmorek	0–2	Maccabi Jaffa	Hapoel Rehovot ground
			Siman-Tov 35'; Ashkenazi 78'	Attendance: 1000; Referee: Gerstler

18 February 1967	Hapoel Kfar Saba	1–2 (a.e.t.)	Hapoel Mahane Yehuda
	Sasson 51'		Z. Ratzabi 53'; Aharoni 110'	Attendance: 4000; Referee: Mizrahi

18 February 1967	Hapoel Ramat Gan	5–0	Hapoel Ganei Tikva
	Nahmias 5' (pen.), 30', 51'; R. Levi 55', 89'			Attendance: 1500; Referee: G. Cohen

18 February 1967	Hapoel Herzliya	1–3	Hakoah Maccabi Ramat Gan	Hapoel Herzliya ground
	Orbach 87'		Shaharbani 54', 75'; Farkas 77'	Attendance: 3000; Referee: Polack

18 February 1967	Hapoel Ashkelon	0–4	Hapoel Haifa	Ashkelon Municipal
			Englander 14', 70'; Vollach 31'; Goldberg 54'	Attendance: 3500; Referee: D. Cohen

18 February 1967	Hapoel Bnei Nazareth	1–0	Sektzia Nes Tziona
	Bilal 28'

18 February 1967	Hapoel Tel Aviv	2–0	Beitar Tel Aviv	Bloomfield Stadium
	Pozgarson 16'; Nurieli 58'			Attendance: 7000; Referee: Pines

18 February 1967	Maccabi Netanya	1–1 (a.e.t.); 3–2 p.	Hapoel Hadera	Maccabi Netanya Stadium
	Rosenzweig 104'		Hershkowitz 111'	Attendance: 3000; Referee: Finkelstein

18 February 1967	Hapoel Kfar Shalem	0–5	Hapoel Be'er Sheva	Hapoel Be'er Sheva Ground
			Cohen 6'; Gozlan 22', 26', 48'; Nadan 76'	Attendance: 2500; Referee: Saban

28 February 1967	Beitar Jerusalem	0–3	Bnei Yehuda	Hapoel Jerusalem ground
			Mag'er 31' (pen.); Mizrahi 73'; Tessa 89'	Attendance: 4000; Referee: Yosefson

28 February 1967	Hapoel Jerusalem	2–1	Hapoel Ra'anana	Hapoel Jerusalem ground
	Singel 57'; M. Cohen 71'		Chirik 8'	Referee: Ben-Itzhak

=== Seventh Round ===
15 April 1967	Hapoel Ramat Gan	1–1 (a.e.t.); 2–4 p.	Maccabi Petah Tikva	HaMakhtesh Stadium
	Wilkomirski 89'		Hibsch 38'	Attendance: 3000; Referee: Eitan

15 April 1967	Hapoel Mahane Yehuda	3–0	Hapoel Bnei Nazareth	Hapoel Petah Tikva ground
	I. Ratzabi 29'; Ratzon 59', 85'			Attendance: 2000; Referee: Linkovski

15 April 1967	Maccabi Netanya	1–0	Hapoel Kiryat Ono	Maccabi Netanya Stadium
	Spiegler 30'			Referee: Uziel

15 April 1967	Hapoel Jerusalem	1–0	Hapoel Be'er Sheva	Hapoel Jerusalem ground
	Lichinski 12'			Attendance: 5000; Referee: Handwerk

3 May 1967	Hapoel Petah Tikva	0–1	Maccabi Tel Aviv	Hapoel Petah Tikva ground
			Vissoker 67' (o.g.)	Attendance: 3000; Referee: Handwerk

23 May 1967	Maccabi Haifa	1–2	Maccabi Jaffa	Haifa Municipal Stadium
	Shmulevich 55' (pen.)		Me'oded 36'; Ashkenazi 80'	Attendance: 3000; Referee: Uziel

23 May 1967	Hapoel Tel Aviv	1–1 abandoned (Note: Hakoah Maccabi Ramat Gan started the match with 7 players, due to army recruits during the waiting period before the Six-Day War. When a Hakoah player got injured at the 36th minute and had to leave the field, the match was abandoned.)	Hakoah Maccabi Ramat Gan	Bloomfield Stadium
	Borba 13'		Shaharbani 29'

26 September 1967	Hapoel Tel Aviv	4–1	Hakoah Maccabi Ramat Gan	Bloomfield Stadium
	Borba 15', 66'; Hazum 25'; Rosenstreik 47'		Farkas 77'	Attendance: 7000; Referee: Moshe Ashkenazi

26 September 1967 (Note: The match was scheduled to 23 May 1967, but as Bnei Yehuda could only field 6 players (due to army recruits during the waiting period before the Six-Day War), the match wasn't played and was rescheduled)	Bnei Yehuda	4–2	Hapoel Haifa	Bloomfield Stadium
	Sharabi ?'; Ozeri 72', 90'; Aloni 77'		Gindin 4'; Gavison 11'	Referee: Handwerk

=== Quarter-finals ===
22 April 1967

Hapoel Mahane Yehuda	2–1	Maccabi Petah Tikva
I. Ratzabi 35'; Ratzon 43'		Begbleiter 14' (pen.)

Hapoel Petah Tikva ground
Attendance: 4000
Referee: Handwerk

3 October 1967

Bnei Yehuda	1–0	Maccabi Jaffa
Sharabi 64'

Bloomfield Stadium, Tel Aviv
Attendance: 4000
Referee: Mizrahi

3 October 1967

Hapoel Tel Aviv	4–2 (a.e.t.)	Maccabi Netanya
Levi 61'; Borba 68'; Hazum 107'; Nurieli 115'		Sabu 2'; Rubinstein 42'

Bloomfield Stadium, Tel Aviv
Attendance: 7000
Referee: Fried

3 October 1967

Hapoel Jerusalem	0–1	Maccabi Tel Aviv
		Sandler 50'

Hapoel Jerusalem ground
Attendance: 4000
Referee: Dudai

=== Semi-finals ===
24 October 1967
12:15

Hapoel Tel Aviv	2–2 (a.e.t.) 4–3 p.	Bnei Yehuda
Nurieli 11'; Borba 58'		Mizrahi 65', 85'

Bloomfield Stadium, Tel Aviv
Attendance: 18000
Referee: Moshe Ashkenazi

24 October 1967
16:15

Maccabi Tel Aviv	3–0	Hapoel Mahane Yehuda
Asis 19'; Sandler 32'; Talbi 76'

Bloomfield Stadium, Tel Aviv
Attendance: 20000
Referee: Klein

=== Final ===
1 November 1967

Maccabi Tel Aviv	2–1	Hapoel Tel Aviv
Kedmi 27'; Talbi 66'		Borba 62'

Bloomfield Stadium, Tel Aviv
Attendance: 20000
Referee: Otto Fried
