= 1966–68 Liga Bet =

Israeli football season

The 1966–68 Liga Bet season saw Hapoel Kiryat Shmona, Maccabi Herzliya, Hapoel Yehud and Hapoel Sderot win their regional divisions and promoted to Liga Alef.

== North Division A ==
Pos	Team	Pld	W	D	L	GF	GA	GD	Pts	Promotion or relegation
1	Hapoel Kiryat Shmona	56	–	–	–	131	31	+100	86	Promoted to Liga Alef
2	Hapoel Kiryat Ata (Note: Hapoel Kfar Ata became Hapoel Kiryat Ata, following the city establishment.)	56	–	–	–	124	55	+69	81	
3	Hapoel Sde Nahum	56	–	–	–	126	73	+53	78	
4	Hapoel Migdal HaEmek	56	–	–	–	107	102	+5	61	
5	Hapoel Tirat HaCarmel	56	–	–	–	129	111	+18	59	
6	Beitar Kiryat Tiv'on	56	–	–	–	89	78	+11	58	
7	Hapoel Afula	56	–	–	–	108	94	+14	57	
8	Hapoel Tel Hanan (Note: Hapoel HaMechonit Tel Hanan became Hapoel Tel Hanan.)	56	–	–	–	83	99	−16	54	
9	Hapoel Afikim	56	–	–	–	93	84	+9	52	
10	Beitar Tirat HaCarmel	56	–	–	–	91	127	−36	46	
11	Beitar Kiryat Shmona	56	–	–	–	74	102	−28	44	
12	Hapoel Ramat David	56	–	–	–	85	131	−46	40	
13	Beitar Acre	56	–	–	–	66	123	−57	40	
14	Hapoel Beit She'an	56	–	–	–	84	121	−37	39	
15	Beitar Nahariya	56	–	–	–	71	124	−53	38	Relegated to Liga Gimel

Notes:

A.S. Kiryat Bialik withdrew from the league and folded.

== North Division B ==
Pos	Team	Pld	W	D	L	GF	GA	GD	Pts	Promotion or relegation
1	Maccabi Herzliya	60	–	–	–	177	69	+108	91	Promoted to Liga Alef
2	Hapoel Beit Eliezer	60	–	–	–	123	68	+55	80	
3	M.S. Even Yehuda	58	–	–	–	140	85	+55	79	
4	Maccabi Pardes Hanna	60	–	–	–	140	113	+27	69	
5	Hapoel Givat Olga	60	–	–	–	106	97	+9	67	
6	Hapoel Givat Haim	60	–	–	–	159	114	+45	66	
7	Maccabi Zikhron Ya'akov	60	–	–	–	137	122	+15	63	
8	Hapoel Zikhron Ya'akov	60	–	–	–	127	106	+21	62	
9	Hapoel Ya'akov Kfar Saba	60	–	–	–	95	112	−17	57	
10	Hapoel Binyamina	59	–	–	–	96	121	−25	53	
11	Hapoel Shefayim	59	–	–	–	100	101	−1	52	
12	Beitar Dov Netanya	60	–	–	–	103	149	−46	51	
13	Beitar Petah Tikva	60	–	–	–	87	96	−9	50	
14	Hapoel Atlit	60	–	–	–	84	132	−48	50	
15	Beitar Haifa	60	–	–	–	67	132	−65	36	Relegated to Liga Gimel
16	Hapoel Dora Netanya	60	–	–	–	65	189	−124	23	Relegated to Liga Gimel

== South Division A ==
Pos	Team	Pld	W	D	L	GF	GA	GD	Pts	Promotion or relegation
1	Hapoel Yehud	60	–	–	–	139	32	+107	102	Promoted to Liga Alef
2	Hapoel Bat Yam	60	–	–	–	144	31	+113	99	
3	Hapoel Rosh HaAyin	60	–	–	–	110	61	+49	74	
4	Beitar Ramat Gan	60	–	–	–	111	74	+37	72	
5	Beitar Holon	60	–	–	–	97	77	+20	72	
6	Maccabi Shmuel Tel Aviv	59	–	–	–	82	68	+14	67	
7	Beitar Harari Bat Yam	59	–	–	–	92	86	+6	63	
8	Hapoel Ganei Tikva	60	–	–	–	93	86	+7	61	
9	Maccabi Bat Yam	60	–	–	–	72	70	+2	61	
10	Maccabi Ramat Gan	60	–	–	–	86	73	+13	58	
11	Hapoel Or Yehuda	60	–	–	–	79	89	−10	57	
12	Hapoel HaTzafon Tel Aviv	60	–	–	–	93	95	−2	55	
13	Hapoel Shikun HaMizrah	60	–	–	–	89	112	−23	51	
14	David Tel Aviv	60	–	–	–	43	106	−63	35	
15	Hapoel Sha'ariya	60	–	–	–	37	143	−106	15	Relegated to Liga Gimel
16	Hapoel Giv'atayim	60	–	–	–	16	173	−157	5	Relegated to Liga Gimel

== South Division B ==
Pos	Team	Pld	W	D	L	GF	GA	GD	Pts	Promotion or relegation
1	Hapoel Sderot	56	–	–	–	120	52	+68	83 (Note: Hapoel Sderot - Hapoel Rehovot, which ended 15-0, annulled due to suspicions of bribery in the match. as Hapoel Sderot found to be not involved, the IFA awarded 3-0 forfeit win to Hapoel Sderot instead.)	Promoted to Liga Alef
2	Maccabi Rehovot	56	–	–	–	117	58	+59	81 (Note: No points or goals were awarded for the Maccabi Rehovot - Maccabi Ramla match.)	
3	Hapoel Eilat	55	–	–	–	117	76	+41	72	
4	Hapoel Dimona	56	–	–	–	85	56	+29	69	
5	Hapoel Ashdod	55	–	–	–	95	78	+17	66	
6	Hapoel Kiryat Malakhi	56	–	–	–	92	74	+18	58	
7	Hapoel Ramla	56	–	–	–	116	98	+18	56	
8	HaBira Jerusalem	56	–	–	–	98	104	−6	51	
9	Hapoel Bnei Zion	56	–	–	–	84	101	−17	51	
10	Hapoel Beit Shemesh	56	–	–	–	88	89	−1	50	
11	Maccabi Ramla	56	–	–	–	116	136	−20	50	
12	Hapoel Ofakim	56	–	–	–	67	103	−36	43	
13	Hapoel Dorot Be'eri (Note: Hapoel Dorot Sha'ar HaNegev merged with Hapoel Be'eri)	56	–	–	–	91	118	−27	37	
14	Hapoel Rehovot	56	–	–	–	77	145	−68	36	
15	Beitar Beit Dagan	56	–	–	–	77	152	−75	26	Relegated to Liga Gimel

Notes:

Elite Ramat Gan withdrew from the league.

== See also ==
- 1966–68 Liga Leumit
- 1966–68 Liga Alef
