= 1985–86 Liga Bet =

Israeli football season

The 1985–86 Liga Bet season saw Hapoel Bnei Tamra, Hapoel Tayibe, Hapoel Tira and Hapoel Ramla win their regional divisions and promoted to Liga Alef.

At the bottom, Hapoel Abu Snan, Hapoel Nahariya (from North A division), Maccabi Zikhron Ya'akov, Hapoel Baqa al-Gharbiyye (from North B division), Hapoel Mahane Yehuda, Maccabi Ramat HaSharon (from South A division), Beitar Lod and Maccabi Be'er Sheva (from South B division) were all automatically relegated to Liga Gimel.

== North Division A ==
Pos	Team	Pld	W	D	L	GF	GA	GD	Pts	Promotion or relegation
1	Hapoel Bnei Tamra	24	–	–	–	46	23	+23	35	Promoted to Liga Alef
2	Maccabi Bnei Hatzor	24	–	–	–	44	21	+23	33	
3	Beitar Kiryat Shmona	24	–	–	–	40	31	+9	32	
4	Maccabi Acre	24	–	–	–	39	22	+17	29	
5	Hapoel Tel Hanan	24	–	–	–	31	25	+6	25	
6	Hapoel Bnei Nazareth	24	–	–	–	32	38	−6	23	
7	Sektzia Ma'alot	24	–	–	–	30	31	−1	22	
8	Hapoel Majd al-Krum	24	–	–	–	32	40	−8	22	
9	Hapoel Afikim	24	–	–	–	28	39	−11	20	
10	Maccabi Kiryat Bialik	24	–	–	–	27	43	−16	20	
11	Hapoel Sakhnin	24	–	–	–	27	36	−9	18	
12	Hapoel Bnei Acre	24	–	–	–	32	41	−9	17	
13	Hapoel Abu Snan	24	–	–	–	25	36	−11	17	Relegated to Liga Gimel

Hapoel Nahariya withdrew from the league and did not show up for their first two opening matches of the season.

== North Division B ==
Pos	Team	Pld	W	D	L	GF	GA	GD	Pts	Promotion or relegation
1	Hapoel Tayibe	26	–	–	–	48	23	+25	38	Promoted to Liga Alef
2	Hapoel Daliyat al-Karmel	26	–	–	–	50	25	+25	34	
3	Hapoel Givat Olga	26	–	–	–	53	40	+13	32	
4	Maccabi Isfiya	26	–	–	–	45	43	+2	31	
5	Hapoel Kafr Sulam	26	–	–	–	36	37	−1	29	
6	Hapoel Migdal HaEmek	26	–	–	–	37	25	+12	26	
7	Hapoel Yokneam	26	–	–	–	29	26	+3	26	
8	Hapoel Nahliel	26	–	–	–	39	47	−8	26	
9	Hapoel Beit Eliezer	26	–	–	–	34	36	−2	24	
10	Hapoel Iksal	26	–	–	–	43	51	−8	24	
11	Maccabi Tzur Shalom	26	–	–	–	43	45	−2	23	
12	Hapoel Umm al-Fahm	26	–	–	–	26	38	−12	19	
13	Maccabi Zikhron Ya'akov	26	–	–	–	26	49	−23	14	Relegated to Liga Gimel
14	Hapoel Baqa al-Gharbiyye	26	–	–	–	20	63	−43	12	Relegated to Liga Gimel

== South Division A ==
Pos	Team	Pld	W	D	L	GF	GA	GD	Pts	Promotion or relegation
1	Hapoel Tira	26	–	–	–	49	21	+28	42	Promoted to Liga Alef
2	Hapoel Ihud Tzeirei Jaffa	26	–	–	–	43	19	+24	40	
3	Maccabi Shikun HaMizrah	26	–	–	–	36	33	+3	32	
4	Hapoel Kfar Shalem	26	–	–	–	46	41	+5	28	
5	Hapoel Kafr Qasim	26	–	–	–	29	29	0	26	
6	Hapoel Jaljulia	26	–	–	–	36	37	−1	26	
7	Maccabi Herzliya	26	–	–	–	30	34	−4	26	
8	Beitar Kfar Saba	26	–	–	–	29	28	+1	25	
9	M.M. Givat Shmuel	26	–	–	–	30	40	−10	23	
10	Maccabi Ramla	26	–	–	–	24	29	−5	21	
11	Beitar Rosh HaAyin	26	–	–	–	27	33	−6	21	
12	Hapoel Herzliya	26	–	–	–	24	30	−6	21	
13	Hapoel Mahane Yehuda	26	–	–	–	25	33	−8	20	Relegated to Liga Gimel
14	Maccabi Ramat HaSharon	26	–	–	–	25	44	−19	13	Relegated to Liga Gimel

== South Division B ==
Pos	Team	Pld	W	D	L	GF	GA	GD	Pts	Promotion or relegation
1	Hapoel Ramla	26	–	–	–	45	12	+33	40	Promoted to Liga Alef
2	Ironi Ashdod	26	–	–	–	41	12	+29	40	
3	Hapoel Ashdod	26	–	–	–	36	25	+11	34	
4	Hapoel Be'er Ya'akov	26	–	–	–	37	30	+7	30	
5	Maccabi Rehovot	26	–	–	–	33	31	+2	27	
6	SK Nes Tziona	26	–	–	–	25	37	−12	25	
7	Hapoel Eilat	26	–	–	–	31	36	−5	23	
8	Maccabi Ramat Ben Zvi	26	–	–	–	27	31	−4	21	
9	Maccabi Kiryat Ekron	26	–	–	–	30	35	−5	21	
10	Beitar Yavne	26	–	–	–	25	31	−6	21	
11	Beitar Lod (Note: Beitar Lod withdrew from the league at the end of the season. as a result, Hapoel Merhavim reprieved from relegation and replaced Beitar Lod in the following season.)	26	–	–	–	20	30	−10	21	Relegated to Liga Gimel
12	Hapoel Sderot	26	–	–	–	25	41	−16	21	
13	Hapoel Merhavim	26	–	–	–	27	38	−11	20	
14	Maccabi Be'er Sheva	26	–	–	–	28	40	−12	20	Relegated to Liga Gimel
