= 1977–78 Liga Gimel =

Israeli football season

The 1977–78 Liga Gimel season saw 108 clubs competing in 8 regional divisions to promote Liga Bet.

Hapoel Afula, Maccabi Shefa-'Amr, Hapoel Ein Mahil, Maccabi Or Akiva, Hapoel Tira, Hapoel Azor, Maccabi Shikun HaMizrah and Maccabi Be'er Sheva won their regional divisions and promoted to Liga Bet.

Maccabi Acre, Hapoel Daliyat al-Karmel, Maccabi Bat Yam and Hapoel Bnei Lakhish were also promoted, as both Liga Leumit and Liga Artzit expanded from 14 to 16 clubs each.

== Galilee Division ==
Pos	Team	Pld	W	D	L	GF	GA	GD	Pts	Promotion or relegation
1	Hapoel Afula	26	16	6	4	94	41	+53	38	Promoted to Liga Bet
2	Maccabi Afula	26	15	6	5	63	27	+36	36	
3	Maccabi Safed	26	11	11	4	59	32	+27	33	
4	Hapoel Kinneret	26	11	10	5	47	42	+5	32	
5	Hapoel Yardena	26	12	7	7	47	41	+6	31	
6	Hapoel Shlomi	26	9	7	10	41	45	−4	25	
7	Hapoel Tur'an	26	8	8	10	41	58	−17	24	
8	Maccabi Beit She'an	26	9	5	12	57	57	0	23	
9	Beitar Tiberias	26	9	5	12	39	54	−15	23	
10	Hapoel Kafr Sumei	26	7	8	11	43	52	−9	22	
11	Beitar Hatzor	26	8	5	13	54	67	−13	21	
12	Maccabi Karmiel	26	9	2	15	42	54	−12	20	
13	Hapoel Karmiel	26	6	7	13	28	45	−17	19	Relegated to Liga Dalet
14	Hapoel Yir'on	26	7	3	16	51	90	−39	17	Relegated to Liga Dalet

== Bay Division ==
Pos	Team	Pld	W	D	L	GF	GA	GD	Pts	Promotion or relegation
1	Maccabi Shefa-'Amr	24	17	5	2	54	26	+28	39	Promoted to Liga Bet
2	Maccabi Acre	24	15	3	6	49	21	+28	33	Promoted to Liga Bet
3	Maccabi Ben Ami	24	12	6	6	40	28	+12	30	
4	Hapoel Makr	24	12	6	6	40	28	+12	30	
5	Maccabi Skahnin	24	10	9	5	38	28	+10	29	
6	Beitar Haifa	24	11	5	8	42	29	+13	27	
7	Hapoel Bnei Tamra	24	11	3	10	42	36	+6	25	
8	Hapoel Abu Snan	24	9	5	10	47	49	−2	23	
9	Hapoel Bnei Acre	24	8	5	11	30	32	−2	21	
10	Maccabi Tzur Shalom	24	7	2	15	38	44	−6	16	
11	Hapoel HaTzair Daliyat al-Karmel	24	4	8	12	28	48	−20	16	
12	Maccabi Tel Hanan	24	4	4	16	32	84	−52	12	
13	Hapoel Sha'ab	24	2	3	19	21	61	−40	7	Relegated to Liga Dalet
–	Hapoel Rechasim	0	0	0	0	0	0	0	0	

== Haifa Division ==
Pos	Team	Pld	W	D	L	GF	GA	GD	Pts	Promotion or relegation
1	Hapoel Ein Mahil	24	19	3	2	63	16	+47	41	Promoted to Liga Bet
2	Hapoel Daliyat al-Karmel	24	18	4	2	83	17	+66	40	Promoted to Liga Bet
3	Hapoel Atlit	24	15	4	5	86	35	+51	34	
4	Beitar al-Amal Nazareth	24	13	3	8	54	36	+18	29	
5	Maccabi Kafr Kanna	24	13	3	8	34	33	+1	29	
6	Hapoel Halissa	24	9	6	9	39	32	+7	24	
7	Hapoel Arraba	24	8	6	10	36	54	−18	22	
8	Hapoel Kafr Kanna	24	8	4	12	28	47	−19	20	
9	Hapoel Yafa	24	5	7	12	28	50	−22	17	
10	Beitar Daliyat al-Karmel	24	5	6	13	30	48	−18	16	
11	Hapoel Ta'anachim	24	6	3	15	43	71	−28	15	
12	Hapoel Kiryat Tiv'on	24	5	2	17	38	94	−56	12	
13	Hapoel Ahva Haifa	24	3	3	18	13	42	−29	9	Relegated to Liga Dalet

== Samaria Division ==
Pos	Team	Pld	W	D	L	GF	GA	GD	Pts	Promotion or relegation
1	Maccabi Or Akiva	24	14	10	0	69	22	+47	38	Promoted to Liga Bet
2	Beitar Pardes Hanna	24	16	5	3	68	23	+45	37	
3	Maccabi Fureidis	24	15	4	5	63	37	+26	34	
4	Maccabi Umm al-Fahm	24	14	2	8	47	35	+12	30	
5	Hapoel Sela Hadera	24	10	8	6	51	36	+15	28	
6	Maccabi Pardes Hanna	24	9	7	8	35	35	0	25	
7	Hapoel Yokne'am	24	8	7	9	54	62	−8	23	
8	Beitar Binyamina	24	7	6	11	45	50	−5	20	
9	Hapoel Lehavot Haviva	24	4	9	11	20	45	−25	17	
10	Beitar Dov Netanya	24	4	8	12	23	40	−17	16	
11	Hapoel Baqa al-Gharbiyye	24	5	5	14	31	63	−32	15	
12	Hapoel Fureidis	24	5	5	14	34	67	−33	15	
13	Hapoel Isfiya	25	5	4	16	36	61	−25	14	Relegated to Liga Dalet

== Sharon Division ==
Pos	Team	Pld	W	D	L	GF	GA	GD	Pts	Promotion or relegation
1	Hapoel Tira	24	20	2	2	82	27	+55	42	Promoted to Liga Bet
2	Hapoel Jaljulia	24	18	2	4	77	26	+51	36 (Note: 2 points deducted)	
3	Maccabi Ramat HaSharon	24	13	4	7	75	42	+33	30	
4	Hapoel Hod HaSharon	24	13	4	7	58	33	+25	30	
5	Hapoel Tnuvot	24	12	5	7	63	33	+30	29	
6	Hapoel Tel Mond	24	11	5	8	51	45	+6	27	
7	Beitar Kfar Saba	24	8	7	9	35	40	−5	23	
8	Maccabi Amidar Netanya	24	9	4	11	42	67	−25	22	
9	Hapoel Ge'ulim	24	7	6	11	36	47	−11	20	
10	Elitzur Bar Ilan	24	7	4	13	41	57	−16	18	
11	Maccabi Yehud	24	5	6	13	42	84	−42	14	
12	Hapoel Sdei Hemed	24	3	5	16	34	86	−52	11	
13	Hapoel Kadima	24	2	2	20	17	66	−49	2 (Note: 4 points deducted)	Relegated to Liga Dalet

== Dan Division ==
Pos	Team	Pld	W	D	L	GF	GA	GD	Pts	Promotion or relegation
1	Hapoel Azor	26	20	4	2	78	17	+61	44	Promoted to Liga Bet
2	Maccabi Bat Yam	26	18	5	3	57	9	+48	41	Promoted to Liga Bet
3	Maccabi Holon	26	17	6	3	73	25	+48	40	
4	Hapoel Kiryat Shalom	26	15	7	4	61	29	+32	37	
5	Hapoel Tzafon Tel Aviv	26	14	6	6	42	37	+5	34	
6	Maccabi Ramat Hen	26	9	4	13	48	49	−1	22	
7	Maccabi Lod	26	10	2	14	47	75	−28	22	
8	Hapoel Ihud Tzeirei Jaffa	26	9	3	14	57	50	+7	21	
9	Hapoel Bnei Zion	25	9	2	14	32	56	−24	20	
10	Maccabi Ben Zvi	26	7	5	14	48	56	−8	19	
11	Hapoel Neve Golan	26	8	2	16	32	51	−19	18	
12	Hapoel Nahlat Yehuda	26	7	3	16	31	70	−39	17	
13	Hapoel Bnei Lod	26	4	8	14	26	59	−33	16	Relegated to Liga Dalet
14	Hapoel Tirat Shalom	26	4	5	17	29	68	−39	13	Relegated to Liga Dalet

== Central Division ==
Pos	Team	Pld	W	D	L	GF	GA	GD	Pts	Promotion or relegation
1	Maccabi Shikun HaMizrah	24	21	0	3	65	15	+50	42	Promoted to Liga Bet
2	Hapoel Sde Uziyah	24	19	2	3	53	21	+32	40	
3	Beitar Lod	24	19	1	4	89	25	+64	39	
4	Maccabi Kiryat Ekron	24	15	4	5	42	22	+20	32 (Note: 2 points deducted)	
5	Maccabi Jerusalem	24	10	8	6	44	42	+2	28	
6	A.S. Moshe Rehovot	24	9	8	7	39	46	−7	26	
7	Hapoel Azrikam	24	9	5	10	34	33	+1	23	
8	ASA Jerusalem	24	7	6	11	42	54	−12	20	
9	Hapoel Mevaseret Zion	24	7	6	11	36	53	−17	20	
10	Maccabi Beit Shemesh	24	6	2	16	38	64	−26	14	
11	Hapoel Hatzav	24	4	5	15	26	55	−29	11	
12	Maccabi Ashdod	24	3	3	18	20	62	−42	9	
13	Hapoel Yehuda	24	2	0	22	9	58	−49	4	Relegated to Liga Dalet

== South Division ==
Pos	Team	Pld	W	D	L	GF	GA	GD	Pts	Promotion or relegation
1	Maccabi Be'er Sheva	26	21	4	1	78	14	+64	46	Promoted to Liga Bet
2	Hapoel Bnei Lakhish	26	18	6	2	67	22	+45	42	Promoted to Liga Bet
3	Hapoel Be'eri Eshkol	26	17	3	6	71	29	+42	37	
4	Maccabi Dimona	26	16	5	5	54	25	+29	37	
5	Beitar Ashkelon	26	16	2	8	47	28	+19	34	
6	Beitar Ofakim	26	14	4	8	54	45	+9	32	
7	Maccabi Kiryat Malakhi	26	11	6	9	46	40	+6	28	
8	Hapoel Arad	26	11	4	11	59	59	0	26	
9	Hapoel Netivot	26	10	2	14	37	50	−13	22	
10	Maccabi Eilat	26	8	1	17	31	45	−14	17	
11	Beitar Kiryat Gat	26	6	4	16	29	58	−29	16	
12	Hapoel Patish	26	6	2	18	28	71	−43	14	
13	Hapoel Sderot	26	2	4	20	17	61	−44	8	Relegated to Liga Dalet
14	Hapoel Bitha	26	2	1	23	13	85	−72	3 (Note: 2 points deducted)	Relegated to Liga Dalet
