= 1965–66 Liga Bet =

Israeli football season

The 1965–66 Liga Bet season saw Hapoel Nahariya, Hapoel Ra'anana, Hapoel Be'er Ya'akov and Beitar Be'er Sheva win their regional divisions and promoted to Liga Alef.

== North Division A ==
Pos	Team	Pld	W	D	L	GF	GA	GD	Pts	Promotion or relegation
1	Hapoel Nahariya	30	–	–	–	78	32	+46	49	Promoted to Liga Alef
2	Hapoel Kfar Ata	30	–	–	–	70	44	+26	42	
3	Hapoel Tirat HaCarmel	30	–	–	–	59	46	+13	39	
4	Hapoel Afikim	30	–	–	–	73	49	+24	36	
5	A.S. Kiryat Bialik	30	–	–	–	62	46	+16	32	
6	Beitar Kiryat Shmona	30	–	–	–	38	43	−5	30	
7	Beitar Kiryat Tiv'on	30	–	–	–	50	50	0	29	
8	Hapoel Migdal HaEmek	30	–	–	–	47	48	−1	29	
9	Beitar Nahariya	30	–	–	–	42	45	−3	29	
10	Hapoel Sde Nahum	30	–	–	–	53	50	+3	28	
11	Hapoel Ramat David	30	–	–	–	53	67	−14	27	
12	Hapoel HaMechonit Tel Hanan	30	–	–	–	38	48	−10	26	
13	Hapoel Afula	30	–	–	–	56	67	−11	26	
14	Beitar Tirat HaCarmel	30	–	–	–	57	71	−14	25	
15	Hapoel Yagur	30	–	–	–	36	34	+2	22	Relegated to Liga Gimel
16	Maccabi Kiryat Yam	30	–	–	–	23	75	−52	9	Relegated to Liga Gimel

== North Division B ==
Pos	Team	Pld	W	D	L	GF	GA	GD	Pts	Promotion or relegation
1	Hapoel Ra'anana	28	–	–	–	89	39	+50	44	Promoted to Liga Alef
2	Maccabi Herzliya	28	–	–	–	53	33	+20	39	
3	M.S. Even Yehuda	28	–	–	–	53	35	+18	39	
4	Hapoel Givat Haim	28	–	–	–	86	39	+47	37	
5	Maccabi Pardes Hanna	28	–	–	–	70	29	+41	36	
6	Hapoel Ya'akov Kfar Saba	28	–	–	–	50	31	+19	35	
7	Hapoel Shefayim	28	–	–	–	46	41	+5	28	
8	Hapoel Givat Olga	28	–	–	–	46	49	−3	27	
9	Maccabi Zikhron Ya'akov	28	–	–	–	53	63	−10	24	
10	Hapoel Binyamina	28	–	–	–	47	62	−15	23	
11	Beitar Dov Netanya	28	–	–	–	41	56	−15	23	
12	Hapoel Dora Netanya	28	–	–	–	43	69	−26	19	
13	Hapoel Beit Eliezer	28	–	–	–	52	71	−19	18	
14	Beitar Petah Tikva	28	–	–	–	30	65	−35	17	
15	Hapoel Pardesiya	28	–	–	–	27	91	−64	9	Relegated to Liga Gimel

Maccabi Neve Shalom withdrew from the league.

== South Division A ==
Pos	Team	Pld	W	D	L	GF	GA	GD	Pts	Promotion or relegation
1	Hapoel Be'er Ya'akov	30	–	–	–	54	18	+36	47	Promoted to Liga Alef
2	Hapoel Bat Yam	30	–	–	–	67	30	+37	43	
3	Maccabi Bat Yam	30	–	–	–	65	33	+32	35	
4	Maccabi Shmuel Tel Aviv	30	–	–	–	53	36	+17	35	
5	Beitar Harari Bat Yam (Note: Beitar Harari Tel Aviv merged with Beitar Bat Yam)	30	–	–	–	44	54	−10	33	
6	Beitar Holon	30	–	–	–	56	45	+11	32 (Note: 1 point deducted)	
7	Hapoel Yehud	30	–	–	–	41	33	+8	31	
8	Hapoel Shikun HaMizrah	30	–	–	–	57	52	+5	29	
9	Hapoel Ganei Tikva	30	–	–	–	47	49	−2	28	
10	Hapoel Or Yehuda	30	–	–	–	40	48	−8	27	
11	Hapoel Sha'ariya	30	–	–	–	67	60	+7	26	
12	Hapoel HaTzafon Tel Aviv	30	–	–	–	42	49	−7	26	
13	Maccabi Ramat Gan	30	–	–	–	43	58	−15	26	
14	Beitar Ramat Gan	30	–	–	–	41	62	−21	26	
15	Beitar Ezra	30	–	–	–	35	74	−39	22	Relegated to Liga Gimel
16	Hapoel Azor	30	–	–	–	40	91	−51	13	Relegated to Liga Gimel

== South Division B ==
Pos	Team	Pld	W	D	L	GF	GA	GD	Pts	Promotion or relegation
1	Beitar Be'er Sheva	30	–	–	–	71	21	+50	47	Promoted to Liga Alef
2	Elite Ramat Gan	30	–	–	–	83	26	+57	46	
3	Maccabi Rehovot	30	–	–	–	64	27	+37	43	
4	Hapoel Rehovot	30	–	–	–	54	57	−3	33	
5	Hapoel Beit Shemesh	30	–	–	–	48	38	+10	32	
6	Hapoel Bnei Zion	30	–	–	–	48	45	+3	31	
7	Hapoel Kiryat Malakhi	30	–	–	–	45	46	−1	31	
8	Hapoel Ashdod	30	–	–	–	46	35	+11	29	
9	Hapoel Dorot Sha'ar HaNegev	30	–	–	–	49	49	0	29	
10	Hapoel Ramla	30	–	–	–	56	55	+1	27	
11	Hapoel Avraham Dimona (Note: Hapoel Avraham Be'er Sheva merged with Hapoel Dimona)	30	–	–	–	41	48	−7	27	
12	Hapoel Eilat	30	–	–	–	45	58	−13	25	
13	Hapoel Ofakim	30	–	–	–	50	71	−21	25	
14	Hapoel Sderot	30	–	–	–	38	64	−26	22	
15	Beitar Rehovot	30	–	–	–	27	67	−40	16	Relegated to Liga Gimel
16	Beitar Kiryat Ekron	30	–	–	–	37	95	−58	13	Relegated to Liga Gimel
