= 1961–62 Liga Gimel =

Israeli football season

The 1961–62 Liga Gimel season saw 103 clubs competing in 9 regional divisions for promotion to Liga Bet.

Beitar Kiryat Shmona, Bnei Nazareth, Beitar Binyamina, Hapoel Dora Netanya, Beitar Kiryat Ono, Hapoel Giv'atayim, ASA Jerusalem, Hapoel Kiryat Gat, Hapoel Ofakim won their regional divisions and promoted to Liga Bet.

Second placed club, Harari Tel Aviv are also promoted.

== Galilee Division ==
- Beitar Kiryat Shmona - Promoted to Liga Bet
- Hapoel Ayelet HaShahar
- Hapoel Dan
- Beitar Safed
- Hapoel Kfar Giladi
- Hapoel Hulata
- Hapoel Hatzor
- Hapoel Neot Mordechai

== Valleys Division ==
- Bnei Nazareth - Promoted to Liga Bet
- Maccabi Afula
- Hapoel Sde Nahum
- Hapoel Ein Harod
- Hapoel Beit She'an
- Hapoel Neve Eitan
- Hapoel Geva
- Hapoel Mishmar HaEmek

== Haifa Division ==
- Beitar Binyamina - Promoted to Liga Bet
- Hapoel Geva HaCarmel
- Hapoel Tirat HaCarmel
- Hapoel Migdal HaEmek
- Hapoel Shlomi
- Al-Amal Acre
- Beitar Acre
- Hapoel Ma'alot
- Hapoel Ein HaMifratz
- Maccabi Kfar Ata
- Beitar Kfar Ata
- Shefa-'Amr Club
- Ahwa Shefa-'Amr

== Samaria Division ==
- Hapoel Dora Netanya - Promoted to Liga Bet
- F.C. Even Yehuda
- Hapoel Beit Eliezer
- Hapoel Kfar Yona
- Hapoel Haogen
- Maccabi Beit Lid
- Hapoel Kadima
- Hapoel Mishmar HaSharon/Kfar Monash
- Hapoel Tel Mond
- Hapoel Karkur
- Hapoel HaSharon HaTzfoni
- Hapoel Beit Yitzhak/Sha'ar Hefer
- Beitar Zvi Netanya
- Hapoel Shefayim

== Dan Division ==
- Beitar Kiryat Ono - Promoted to Liga Bet
- Hapoel Ramat HaSharon
- Maccabi Herzliya
- HaKochav Or Yehuda
- Hapoel Beit Dagan
- Beitar Beit Dagan
- Hapoel Zeitan
- Hapoel Mahane Israel
- Beitar Mahane Israel
- Hapoel Shikun HaMizrah
- Hapoel Zarnuga
- Beitar Yehud
- Beitar Rishon LeZion
- Hapoel Hadar Ramatayim

== Tel Aviv Division ==
- Hapoel Giv'atayim - Promoted to Liga Bet
- Harari Tel Aviv - Promoted to Liga Bet
- Hapoel Ezra
- Beitar Ezra
- Hapoel Jaffa
- Hapoel Kfar Shalem
- Hapoel Pardes Katz
- Hapoel Sha'ariya
- Beitar Sha'ariya
- Beitar Ganei Tikva
- Beitar Petah Tikva
- Beitar Bnei Brak
- Hapoel Rosh Ha'ayin
- Beitar Ramat Gan

== Jerusalem Division ==
- ASA Jerusalem - Promoted to Liga Bet
- Hapoel Shmuel Ramla
- Hapoel HaTzafon Jerusalem
- Hapoel HaDarom Jerusalem
- Hapoel Shimahom Beit Shemesh
- Beitar Beit Shemesh
- Hapoel Givat Brenner
- Hapoel Yehoshua
- Hapoel Zichronot
- Beitar Ekron

== Central Division ==
- Hapoel Kiryat Gat - Promoted to Liga Bet
- Maccabi Kiryat Gat
- Hapoel Ashdod
- Hapoel Sde Uziyahu
- Hapoel Beit Ezra
- Maccabi Ashdod
- Hapoel Gedera
- Hapoel Kiryat Malakhi
- Hapoel Azrikam
- Hapoel Gat
- Maccabi Kfar Gvirol
- Hof Ashkelon
- Hapoel Palmahim ^{1}

1. Hapoel Palmahim folded at the beginning of the season, and were suspended by the Israel Football Association.

== Negev Division ==
- Hapoel Ofakim - Promoted to Liga Bet
- Hapoel Nir Yitzhak
- Hapoel Be'eri
- Hapoel Kfar Yeruham
- Hapoel Shoval
- Hapoel Shelahim
- Hapoel Mitzpe Ramon
- Hapoel Dimona
- Hapoel Patish\Maslul

== See also ==
- 1961–62 Liga Leumit
- 1961–62 Liga Alef
- 1961–62 Liga Bet
