= 1964–65 Liga Gimel =

Israeli football season

The 1964–65 Liga Gimel season saw 162 clubs competing in 14 regional divisions for promotion to Liga Bet.

Hapoel Hatzor, Hapoel Kafr Yasif, Maccabi Kiryat Yam, Hapoel Sde Nahum, Beitar Tirat HaCarmel, Hapoel Binyamina, Hapoel HaSharon HaTzfoni, Hapoel Sha'ariya, Elite Ramat Gan, Beitar Holon, Maccabi Kiryat Malakhi, Hapoel Beit Shemesh, Beitar Ashkelon and Hapoel Yeruham won their regional divisions and qualified for the Promotion play-offs.

At the Promotion play-offs, Hapoel Sde Nahum, Hapoel Binyamina, Maccabi Kiryat Yam and Beitar Tirat HaCarmel were promoted to Liga Bet from the North play-offs, whilst Hapoel Sha'ariya, Hapoel Beit Shemesh, Elite Ramat Gan and Beitar Holon were promoted to Liga Bet from the South play-offs.

== Eastern Galilee Division ==
Pos	Team	Pld	W	D	L	GF	GA	GD	Pts	Qualification
1	Hapoel Hatzor	20	–	–	–	75	9	+66	38	Promotion play-offs
2	Beitar Safed	20	–	–	–	71	23	+48	30	
3	Hapoel Dan	20	–	–	–	58	21	+37	30	
4	Beitar Tiberias	20	–	–	–	54	24	+30	25	
5	Hapoel Kfar Giladi	20	–	–	–	43	35	+8	19	
6	Hapoel Bnei HaGalil	20	–	–	–	29	29	0	19	
7	Hapoel Tiberias Illit	20	–	–	–	31	52	−21	14	
8	Maccabi Rosh Pinna	20	–	–	–	30	48	−18	13	
9	Hapoel Hula Textile	20	–	–	–	28	56	−28	12	
10	Hapoel Sharona\Kfar Kama	20	–	–	–	35	49	−14	10	
11	Hapoel Eilabun	20	–	–	–	2	110	−108	0	

== Western Galilee Division ==
Pos	Team	Pld	W	D	L	GF	GA	GD	Pts	Qualification
1	Hapoel Kafr Yasif	12	–	–	–	44	8	+36	21	Promotion play-offs
2	Hapoel Netiv HaShayara	12	–	–	–	33	24	+9	15	
3	Hapoel Tarshiha	12	–	–	–	21	18	+3	13	
4	Hapoel Mi'ilya	12	–	–	–	24	28	−4	12	
5	Maccabi Nahariya	12	–	–	–	28	26	+2	11	
6	Atid Tamra	12	–	–	–	17	37	−20	7	
7	Hapoel Ma'alot	12	–	–	–	9	35	−26	5	

== Bay Division ==
Pos	Team	Pld	W	D	L	GF	GA	GD	Pts	Qualification
1	Maccabi Kiryat Yam	18	–	–	–	52	11	+41	30	Promotion play-offs
2	Al-Amal Acre	18	–	–	–	51	19	+32	27	
3	Beitar Acre	18	–	–	–	41	12	+29	26	
4	Hapoel Ein HaMifratz	18	–	–	–	48	20	+28	24	
5	Hapoel Kiryat Yam	18	–	–	–	31	24	+7	19	
6	Beitar Kiryat Binyamin	18	–	–	–	27	24	+3	15	
7	Hapoel Kiryat Binyamin	18	–	–	–	32	36	−4	15	
8	Al Ahly Majd al-Krum	18	–	–	–	14	47	−33	8	
9	Maccabi Kfar Ata	18	–	–	–	16	55	−39	7	
10	HaPiryon Shefa-'Amr	18	–	–	–	18	85	−67	5	

== Valleys Division ==
Pos	Team	Pld	W	D	L	GF	GA	GD	Pts	Qualification
1	Hapoel Sde Nahum	20	–	–	–	109	14	+95	39	Promotion play-offs
2	Hapoel Beit She'an	20	–	–	–	63	32	+31	29	
3	Hapoel Beit HaShita	20	–	–	–	64	23	+41	28	
4	Hapoel Tel Yosef	20	–	–	–	70	40	+30	25	
5	Maccabi Afula	20	–	–	–	59	39	+20	23	
6	Maccabi Beit She'an	20	–	–	–	43	52	−9	22	
7	Hapoel Geva	20	–	–	–	52	54	−2	21	
8	Beitar Beit She'an	20	–	–	–	25	63	−38	8	
9	Beitar Afula	20	–	–	–	27	69	−42	8	
10	Hapoel Vatikei Balfouria	20	–	–	–	18	64	−46	6	
11	Hapoel Balfouria	20	–	–	–	16	96	−80	3	

== Haifa Division ==
Pos	Team	Pld	W	D	L	GF	GA	GD	Pts	Qualification
1	Beitar Tirat HaCarmel	22	–	–	–	78	22	+56	37	Promotion play-offs
2	Hapoel Kiryat Nazareth	22	–	–	–	51	26	+25	32	
3	Hapoel Geva HaCarmel	22	–	–	–	66	31	+35	30	
4	Hapoel Kiryat Tiv'on	22	–	–	–	51	28	+23	29	
5	Beitar Tel Hanan	22	–	–	–	41	33	+8	25	
6	Hapoel Yokneam	22	–	–	–	45	43	+2	25	
7	Maccabi Tel Hanan	22	–	–	–	57	53	+4	21	
8	Hapoel Kafr Sulam	22	–	–	–	31	42	−11	19	
9	Hapoel Hever	22	–	–	–	37	58	−21	16	
10	Al Ahly Nazareth	22	–	–	–	35	52	−17	15	
11	Beitar Atlit	22	–	–	–	25	69	−44	12	
12	Beitar Rekhasim	22	–	–	–	4	63	−59	4	

== Samaria Division ==
Pos	Team	Pld	W	D	L	GF	GA	GD	Pts	Qualification
1	Hapoel Binyamina	22	–	–	–	89	21	+68	37	Promotion play-offs
2	Beitar Hadera	22	–	–	–	73	20	+53	36	
3	Hapoel Zikhron Ya'akov	22	–	–	–	70	24	+46	33	
4	Hapoel Or Akiva	22	–	–	–	67	20	+47	31	
5	Maccabi Fureidis	22	–	–	–	46	40	+6	22	
6	Beitar Binyamina	22	–	–	–	40	47	−7	20	
7	Beitar Zikhron Ya'akov	22	–	–	–	46	56	−10	19	
8	Hapoel Karkur	22	–	–	–	34	55	−21	19	
9	Hapoel Lehavot Haviva	22	–	–	–	48	45	+3	16	
10	Hapoel Elyakhin	22	–	–	–	28	55	−27	15	
11	Hapoel Kafr Qara	22	–	–	–	22	79	−57	7	
12	F.C. Kafr Qara	22	–	–	–	2	103	−101	2	

== Netanya Division ==
Pos	Team	Pld	W	D	L	GF	GA	GD	Pts	Qualification
1	Hapoel HaSharon HaTzfoni	26	–	–	–	92	27	+65	42	Promotion play-offs
2	Hapoel Beit Yitzhak	26	–	–	–	97	33	+64	42	
3	Hapoel Tel Mond	26	–	–	–	95	39	+56	33	
4	Hapoel Tira	26	–	–	–	61	51	+10	31	
5	Hapoel Yanuv	26	–	–	–	59	37	+22	30	
6	Hapoel Kfar Yona	26	–	–	–	71	48	+23	29	
7	Maccabi Amidar Netanya	26	–	–	–	60	45	+15	29	
8	Maccabi HaSharon Netanya	26	–	–	–	42	46	−4	26	
9	F.C. Ein Ya'akov	26	–	–	–	46	44	+2	24	
10	Hapoel Tayibe	26	–	–	–	33	77	−44	18	
11	Beitar Zvi Netanya	26	–	–	–	47	90	−43	15	
12	Hapoel Tnuvot	26	–	–	–	26	71	−45	13	
13	Hapoel Burgata	26	–	–	–	29	59	−30	10	
14	Maccabi Kfar Yona	26	–	–	–	22	113	−91	6	

== Sharon Division ==
Pos	Team	Pld	W	D	L	GF	GA	GD	Pts	Qualification
1	Hapoel Sha'ariya	24	–	–	–	108	10	+98	45	Promotion play-offs
2	Hapoel Rosh HaAyin	24	–	–	–	93	19	+74	42	
3	Hapoel Kafr Qasim	24	–	–	–	65	30	+35	34	
4	Hapoel Jaljulia	24	–	–	–	70	36	+34	31	
5	Beitar Mahane Yehuda	24	–	–	–	71	32	+39	30	
6	Beitar Magdiel	24	–	–	–	57	49	+8	27	
7	Beitar Kiryat Matalon	24	–	–	–	63	53	+10	25	
8	Beitar Rosh HaAyin	24	–	–	–	39	82	−43	13	
9	Maccabi Rosh HaAyin	24	–	–	–	32	71	−39	13	
10	Beitar Ganei Tikva	24	–	–	–	28	74	−46	13	
11	Beitar Kfar Saba	24	–	–	–	22	69	−47	11	
12	Shimshon Rosh HaAyin	24	–	–	–	28	92	−64	11	
13	Maccabi Kafr Qasim	24	–	–	–	25	91	−66	11	

== Tel Aviv Division ==
Pos	Team	Pld	W	D	L	GF	GA	GD	Pts	Qualification
1	Elite Ramat Gan	24	–	–	–	97	16	+81	43	Promotion play-offs
2	Hapoel Ramat HaSharon	24	–	–	–	69	32	+37	34	
3	Beitar Herzliya	24	–	–	–	70	33	+37	33	
4	Hapoel Nof Yam	24	–	–	–	56	37	+19	31	
5	Hapoel Ezra	24	–	–	–	47	34	+13	29	
6	David Tel Aviv	24	–	–	–	59	33	+26	27	
7	Hapoel Kireon	24	–	–	–	50	58	−8	22	
8	Maccabi Aviv	24	–	–	–	33	43	−10	21	
9	Maccabi Ever HaYarkon	24	–	–	–	40	60	−20	17	
10	Hapoel Bavli Tel Aviv	24	–	–	–	34	65	−31	16	
11	Maccabi Darom Tel Aviv	24	–	–	–	43	74	−31	15	
12	Beitar Sheikh Munis	24	–	–	–	34	65	−31	15	
13	Beitar HaTzafon Tel Aviv	24	–	–	–	24	106	−82	2	

== Jaffa Division ==
Pos	Team	Pld	W	D	L	GF	GA	GD	Pts	Qualification
1	Beitar Holon	24	–	–	–	107	9	+98	46	Promotion play-offs
2	Beitar Bat Yam	24	–	–	–	116	12	+104	45	
3	Hapoel Bnei Ramla	24	–	–	–	84	26	+58	37	
4	Maccabi Ramla	24	–	–	–	85	32	+53	34	
5	Beitar Yehud	24	–	–	–	57	57	0	27	
6	Shabab Jaffa	24	–	–	–	47	58	−11	21	
7	Tzeirei Jaffa	24	–	–	–	42	52	−10	20	
8	Ahva Ramla	24	–	–	–	36	59	−23	20	
9	Hapoel Neve Monosson	24	–	–	–	43	68	−25	19	
10	Maccabi Yehud	24	–	–	–	27	73	−46	19	
11	Beitar Jaffa	24	–	–	–	31	118	−87	10	
12	Hapoel Zeitan	24	–	–	–	16	63	−47	9	
13	Poalei Jaffa	24	–	–	–	5	69	−64	2	

== Central Division ==
Pos	Team	Pld	W	D	L	GF	GA	GD	Pts	Qualification
1	Maccabi Kiryat Malakhi	22	–	–	–	57	17	+40	36	Promotion play-offs
2	Beitar Beit Dagan	22	–	–	–	71	22	+49	35	
3	Hapoel Givat Brenner	22	–	–	–	60	34	+26	31	
4	Maccabi Kfar Gvirol	22	–	–	–	55	26	+29	29	
5	Hapoel Gedera	22	–	–	–	48	27	+21	29	
6	Maccabi Yavne	22	–	–	–	40	42	−2	17	
7	Maccabi Ekron	22	–	–	–	31	38	−7	17	
8	Beitar Gedera	22	–	–	–	38	47	−9	17	
9	Beitar Rishon LeZion	22	–	–	–	37	56	−19	17	
10	Maccabi Ezra UBitzaron	22	–	–	–	33	68	−35	9	
11	Maccabi Gan Yavne	22	–	–	–	33	87	−54	7	
12	Hapoel Hatzav	22	–	–	–	17	56	−39	7	

== Jerusalem Division ==
Pos	Team	Pld	W	D	L	GF	GA	GD	Pts	Qualification
1	Hapoel Beit Shemesh	20	–	–	–	76	14	+62	33	Promotion play-offs
2	Hapoel Kiryat Gat	20	–	–	–	55	25	+30	25	
3	Hapoel Katamonim	20	–	–	–	54	27	+27	25	
4	Beitar Beit Shemesh	20	–	–	–	42	23	+19	25	
5	Maccabi Kiryat Gat	20	–	–	–	39	26	+13	24	
6	Hapoel Beit Safafa	20	–	–	–	30	25	+5	24	
7	Hapoel Ein Karem	20	–	–	–	32	38	−6	18	
8	Beitar Ein Karem	20	–	–	–	45	39	+6	16	
9	Maccabi Beit Shemesh	20	–	–	–	30	45	−15	14	
10	Hapoel Shahar	20	–	–	–	18	61	−43	8	
11	Hapoel Menuha	20	–	–	–	3	101	−98	0	

== South Division ==
Pos	Team	Pld	W	D	L	GF	GA	GD	Pts	Qualification
1	Beitar Ashkelon	22	–	–	–	79	19	+60	38	Promotion play-offs
2	Maccabi Ashkelon	22	–	–	–	72	27	+45	34	
3	Hapoel Sde Uziyahu	22	–	–	–	48	25	+23	30	
4	Hapoel Or HaNer	22	–	–	–	52	29	+23	29	
5	Maccabi Ashdod	22	–	–	–	43	48	−5	24	
6	Hapoel Mefalsim	22	–	–	–	39	48	−9	20	
7	Hapoel Erez	22	–	–	–	38	45	−7	19	
8	Beitar Ashdod	22	–	–	–	42	38	+4	18	
9	Hapoel Gevim	22	–	–	–	34	51	−17	14	
10	Hapoel Beit Ezra	22	–	–	–	34	64	−30	13	
11	Hapoel Shtulim	22	–	–	–	27	48	−21	12	
12	Hapoel Bror Hayil	22	–	–	–	22	79	−57	7	

== Negev Division ==
Pos	Team	Pld	W	D	L	GF	GA	GD	Pts	Qualification
1	Hapoel Yeruham	20	–	–	–	60	20	+40	33	Promotion play-offs
2	Hapoel Dimona	20	–	–	–	70	12	+58	30	
3	Maccabi Be'er Sheva	20	–	–	–	73	25	+48	28	
4	Beitar Dimona	20	–	–	–	47	10	+37	27	
5	Hapoel Mitzpe Ramon	20	–	–	–	45	27	+18	26	
6	Shimshon Yeruham	20	–	–	–	39	35	+4	23	
7	Hapoel Mashabei Sadeh	20	–	–	–	29	54	−25	13	
8	Beitar Ofakim	20	–	–	–	26	52	−26	11	
9	Maccabi Dimona	20	–	–	–	17	48	−31	10	
10	Beitar Yeruham	20	–	–	–	11	72	−61	6	
11	Maccabi Ofakim	20	–	–	–	4	66	−62	1	

== Promotion play-offs ==
=== North play-offs ===
Pos	Team	Pld	W	D	L	GF	GA	GD	Pts	Promotion
1	Hapoel Sde Nahum	6	–	–	–	16	7	+9	10	Promoted to Liga Bet
2	Hapoel Binyamina	6	–	–	–	18	11	+7	9	Promoted to Liga Bet
3	Maccabi Kiryat Yam	6	–	–	–	11	8	+3	7	Promoted to Liga Bet
4	Beitar Tirat HaCarmel	5	–	–	–	12	13	−1	4	Promoted to Liga Bet
5	Hapoel Kafr Yasif	6	–	–	–	12	19	−7	4	Remained in Liga Gimel
6	Hapoel Hatzor	6	–	–	–	6	11	−5	4	Remained in Liga Gimel
7	Hapoel HaSharon HaTzfoni	5	–	–	–	6	12	−6	2	Remained in Liga Gimel

=== South play-offs ===
Pos	Team	Pld	W	D	L	GF	GA	GD	Pts	Promotion
1	Hapoel Sha'ariya	6	–	–	–	24	8	+16	9	Promoted to Liga Bet
2	Hapoel Beit Shemesh	6	–	–	–	10	4	+6	9	Promoted to Liga Bet
3	Elite Ramat Gan	6	–	–	–	13	8	+5	8	Promoted to Liga Bet
4	Beitar Holon	6	–	–	–	12	8	+4	7	Promoted to Liga Bet
5	Hapoel Yeruham	5	–	–	–	7	14	−7	4	Remained in Liga Gimel
6	Beitar Ashkelon	6	–	–	–	8	12	−4	3	Remained in Liga Gimel
7	Maccabi Kiryat Malakhi	5	–	–	–	2	22	−20	0	Remained in Liga Gimel

== See also ==
- 1964–65 Liga Leumit
- 1964–65 Liga Alef
- 1964–65 Liga Bet
