= 1986–87 Liga Bet =

Israeli football season

The 1986–87 Liga Bet season saw Hapoel Bnei Nazareth, Maccabi Isfiya, Maccabi Herzliya and Hapoel Ashdod win their regional divisions and promoted to Liga Alef. In the North A division, the final decisive match between Hapoel Bnei Nazareth and Maccabi Acre was postponed for over a month after league matches ended, and was eventually played on 13 June 1987. Nazareth won the match 2–0 and was promoted to Liga Alef.

At the bottom, Hapoel Afikim, Beitar Kiryat Shmona (from North A division), Beitar Pardes Hanna, Hapoel Beit Eliezer (from North B division), Beitar Pardes Katz, Beitar Kfar Saba (from South A division), Hapoel Sderot and Hapoel Merhavim (from South B division) were all automatically relegated to Liga Gimel.

== North A Division ==
Pos	Team	Pld	W	D	L	GF	GA	GD	Pts	Promotion or relegation
1	Hapoel Bnei Nazareth	24	18	4	2	43	17	+26	40	Promoted to Liga Alef
2	Maccabi Acre	24	16	6	2	39	12	+27	38	
3	Maccabi Shefa-Amr	24	11	6	7	43	30	+13	28	
4	Hapoel Safed	24	7	10	7	33	35	−2	24	
5	Bnei Hatzor HaGlilit	24	8	7	9	41	36	+5	23	
6	Hapoel Nazareth Illit	24	6	10	8	27	29	−2	22	
7	Hapoel Majd al-Krum	24	8	5	11	27	29	−2	21	
8	Hapoel Sakhnin	24	7	7	10	31	34	−3	21	
9	Maccabi Givat HaRakafot	24	8	5	11	23	30	−7	21	
10	Hapoel Bnei Acre	24	7	8	9	31	33	−2	20 (Note: Two points deducted.)	
11	Maccabi Kiryat Bialik	24	6	8	10	22	35	−13	20	
12	Sektzia Ma'alot	24	3	12	9	18	35	−17	18	
13	Hapoel Afikim	24	6	2	16	21	44	−23	14	Relegated to Liga Gimel
–	Beitar Kiryat Shmona	0	–	–	–	–	–	—	0	Folded (Note: Beitar Kiryat Shmona withdrew from the league and its results were annulled.)

== North B Division ==
Pos	Team	Pld	W	D	L	GF	GA	GD	Pts	Promotion or relegation
1	Maccabi Isfiya	26	18	6	2	51	21	+30	42	Promoted to Liga Alef
2	Hapoel Daliyat al-Karmel	26	16	3	7	49	21	+28	35	
3	Hapoel Givat Olga	26	11	9	6	39	33	+6	31	
4	Hapoel Umm al-Fahm	26	9	8	9	37	30	+7	26	
5	Hapoel Kafr Sulam	26	8	9	9	42	44	−2	25	
6	Hapoel Iksal	26	8	8	10	34	38	−4	24	
7	Hapoel Tel Hanan	26	8	8	10	43	53	−10	24	
8	Maccabi Tzur Shalom	26	10	6	10	37	40	−3	23 (Note: Three points deducted.)	
9	Hapoel Yokneam	26	6	11	9	26	37	−11	23	
10	Maccabi Tzofei Haifa	26	8	7	11	35	47	−12	23	
11	Hapoel Migdal HaEmek	26	6	10	10	38	39	−1	22	
12	Hapoel Nahliel	26	7	8	11	33	41	−8	22	
13	Beitar Pardes Hanna	26	4	14	8	18	26	−8	22	Relegated to Liga Gimel
14	Hapoel Beit Eliezer	26	6	7	13	22	34	−12	19	Relegated to Liga Gimel

== South A Division ==
Pos	Team	Pld	W	D	L	GF	GA	GD	Pts	Promotion or relegation
1	Maccabi Herzliya	26	17	6	3	49	17	+32	40	Promoted to Liga Alef
2	Hapoel Kafr Qasim	26	17	6	3	47	22	+25	40	
3	Hapoel Herzliya	26	12	7	7	41	26	+15	31	
4	Hapoel Kfar Shalem	26	10	10	6	31	22	+9	30	
5	Maccabi HaShikma Ramat Gan	26	10	8	8	30	32	−2	28	
6	Maccabi Shikun HaMizrah	26	9	7	10	35	35	0	25	
7	M.M. Givat Shmuel	26	8	8	10	33	32	+1	24	
8	Hapoel Jaljulia	26	9	6	11	32	32	0	24	
9	Hapoel Ihud Tzeirei Jaffa	26	8	6	12	29	31	−2	22	
10	Beitar Rosh HaAyin	26	8	6	12	25	37	−12	22	
11	Beitar Kfar Yona	26	7	7	12	28	38	−10	21	
12	Maccabi Bat Yam	26	8	5	13	24	35	−11	21	
13	Beitar Pardes Katz	26	6	8	12	26	45	−19	20	Relegated to Liga Gimel
14	Beitar Kfar Saba	26	6	4	16	23	49	−26	16	Relegated to Liga Gimel

== South Division B ==
Pos	Team	Pld	W	D	L	GF	GA	GD	Pts	Promotion or relegation
1	Hapoel Ashdod	26	20	5	1	55	18	+37	45	Promoted to Liga Alef
2	SK Nes Tziona	26	15	7	4	53	23	+30	37	
3	Hapoel Be'er Ya'akov	26	14	6	6	55	32	+23	34	
4	Beitar Yavne	26	9	12	5	30	26	+4	30	
5	Maccabi Ironi Ashdod	26	10	8	8	30	26	+4	28	
6	Hapoel Eilat	26	8	8	10	34	34	0	24	
7	Maccabi Ben Zvi	26	6	10	10	21	31	−10	22	
8	Maccabi Rehovot	26	8	6	12	23	34	−11	22	
9	Maccabi Ramla	26	4	14	8	25	37	−12	22	
10	Beitar Kiryat Malakhi	26	7	8	11	22	37	−15	22	
11	Hapoel Mevaseret Zion	26	5	11	10	38	44	−6	21	
12	Maccabi Kiryat Ekron	26	8	5	13	25	36	−11	21	
13	Hapoel Sderot	26	7	7	12	28	39	−11	21	Relegated to Liga Gimel
14	Hapoel Merhavim	26	4	7	15	21	43	−22	15	Relegated to Liga Gimel
