= 1987–88 Liga Alef =

Israeli football season

The 1987–88 Liga Alef season saw Maccabi Tamra (champions of the North Division) and Beitar Ramla (champions of the South Division) win their regional divisions and promotion to Liga Artzit.

At the bottom, Hapoel Bnei Tamra, Hapoel Ra'anana (from the North division), Hapoel Azor and Hapoel Ramat HaSharon (from the South division) relegated to Liga Bet.

== North Division ==
Pos	Team	Pld	W	D	L	GF	GA	GD	Pts	Qualification or relegation
1	Maccabi Tamra	30	18	9	3	52	21	+31	45	Promoted to Liga Artzit
2	Hapoel Beit She'an	30	18	8	4	40	18	+22	44	
3	Maccabi Afula	30	15	7	8	47	34	+13	37	
4	Maccabi Hadera	30	12	13	5	31	22	+9	37	
5	Maccabi Isfiya	30	12	8	10	30	33	−3	32	
6	Maccabi Ahi Nazareth	30	11	8	11	31	34	−3	30	
7	Hapoel Kiryat Shmona	30	12	6	12	28	33	−5	30	
8	Hapoel Tirat HaCarmel	30	11	6	13	27	30	−3	28	
9	Beitar Haifa	30	9	10	11	31	39	−8	28	
10	Hapoel Tayibe	30	9	9	12	27	32	−5	27	
11	Hapoel Kiryat Ata	30	9	8	13	22	33	−11	26	
12	Hapoel Bnei Nazareth	30	9	7	14	27	34	−7	25	
13	Beitar Nahariya	30	7	11	12	19	29	−10	25	
14	Hapoel Tira	30	8	7	15	23	30	−7	23	
15	Hapoel Bnei Tamra	30	8	7	15	29	40	−11	23	Relegated to Liga Bet
16	Hapoel Ra'anana	30	7	6	17	27	39	−12	20	Relegated to Liga Bet

Updated to match(es) played on unknown. Source: Yedioth Ahronoth (in Hebrew)

== South Division ==
Pos	Team	Pld	W	D	L	GF	GA	GD	Pts	Qualification or relegation
1	Beitar Ramla	30	14	14	2	37	14	+23	42	Promoted to Liga Artzit
2	Hapoel Rishon LeZion	30	15	11	4	50	24	+26	41	
3	Maccabi Kiryat Gat	30	14	10	6	31	19	+12	38	
4	Hapoel Ashdod	30	14	6	10	34	26	+8	34	
5	Hapoel Kiryat Ono	30	11	11	8	33	29	+4	33	
6	Hapoel Ashkelon	30	9	12	9	25	23	+2	30	
7	Hapoel Or Yehuda	30	9	10	11	24	31	−7	28	
8	Hapoel Dimona	30	9	9	12	29	26	+3	27	
9	Hapoel Marmorek	30	8	11	11	35	39	−4	27	
10	Maccabi Lazaros Holon	30	8	11	11	23	28	−5	27	
11	Hapoel Kiryat Malakhi	30	8	11	11	36	42	−6	27	
12	Hapoel Beit Shemesh	30	7	13	10	34	45	−11	27	
13	Maccabi Herzliya	30	8	10	12	21	36	−15	26	
14	Hapoel Ramla	30	5	15	10	29	34	−5	25	
15	Hapoel Azor	30	6	13	11	20	36	−16	25	Relegated to Liga Bet
16	Hapoel Ramat HaSharon	30	5	13	12	25	37	−12	23	Relegated to Liga Bet

Updated to match(es) played on unknown. Source: Yedioth Ahronoth (in Hebrew)
