= 1988–89 Liga Bet =

Israeli football season

The 1988–89 Liga Bet season saw Ironi Ashdod win their regional divisions and promoted to Liga Alef.

At the bottom, Beitar Kiryat Gat and Hapoel Yeruham (from South B division) were all automatically relegated to Liga Gimel.

== South Division B ==
Pos	Team	Pld	W	D	L	GF	GA	GD	Pts	Promotion or relegation
1	Ironi Ashdod	24	–	–	–	43	7	+36	41	Promoted to Liga Alef
2	SK Nes Tziona	24	–	–	–	52	9	+43	40	
3	Beitar Be'er Sheva	24	–	–	–	39	15	+24	35	
4	Hapoel Eilat	24	–	–	–	31	30	+1	26	
5	Maccabi Be'er Sheva	24	–	–	–	26	26	0	24	
6	Beitar Yavne	24	–	–	–	23	27	−4	20	
7	Maccabi Rehovot	24	–	–	–	23	30	−7	20	
8	Maccabi Ramat Ben Zvi	24	–	–	–	17	26	−9	20	
9	Beitar Lod	24	–	–	–	19	31	−12	20	
10	Hapoel Sderot	24	–	–	–	19	34	−15	18	
11	Maccabi Ramla	24	–	–	–	21	37	−16	18	
12	Beitar Kiryat Malakhi	24	–	–	–	23	41	−18	17	
13	Beitar Kiryat Gat	24	–	–	–	19	43	−24	16	Relegated to Liga Gimel
14	Hapoel Yeruham	0	–	–	–	0	0	0	0 (Note: Hapoel Yeruham dismantling during the season. All results are not counted.)	Relegated to Liga Gimel
