= Beitar Kiryat Ono F.C. =

Beitar Kiryat Ono
- Full name: Beitar Kiryat Ono Football Club בית"ר קרית אונו
- Founded: 1954
- Dissolved: 2004
- Ground: Kiryat Ono Stadium, Kiryat Ono
- Capacity: 1,500
- 2003–04: Liga Gimel Tel Aviv, 2nd (Promoted)
Home colours	Away colours

Beitar Kiryat Ono (Hebrew: בית"ר קרית אונו) was an Israeli football club based in Kiryat Ono. The club played two seasons in Liga Alef, then the second tier of Israeli football league system.

== History ==
The club was founded in 1954 by Mordechai Bejerano. In 1961–62, Beitar won Liga Gimel Dan division and were promoted to Liga Bet, the third tier of Israeli football at the time, following away victory of 3–2 in the last and decisive match of the season against promotion contenders, Hapoel Ramat HaSharon. In Liga Bet, after finished 11th and 4th respectively in the 1962–63 and 1963–64 seasons, the club won the North B division in the 1964–65 season, after topping the league for the entire season, and made historic promotion to the second tier, Liga Alef. Beitar were placed at the South division of Liga Alef for the 1965–66 season, in which they avoided relegation in the last match of the season, after winning 1–0 in a derby against Hapoel Kiryat Ono. In the following season, which was the double season of 1966–68, the club finished second bottom and dropped back to Liga Bet. Beitar suffered further relegation in the 1968–69 season, this time to Liga Gimel, after they finished at the bottom of South A division, with only one point and 100 goals against.

35 years later, in 2003–04, the club finished runners-up in Liga Gimel Tel Aviv division, behind champions, Hapoel Ramat Yisrael, and made a return to Liga Bet (now as the fifth tier). Beitar started the 2004–05 season in Liga Bet South A division, where they faced local rivals, Hapoel Kiryat Ono, in a match which ended in draw. However, on 26 December 2004 (in the midst of the season), the Municipality of Kiryat Ono have decided to close the club and leave Hapoel as the only club in the city.

== Honours ==
=== League ===
Honour	No.	Years
Third tier	1	1964–65
Fourth tier	1	1961–62^{1}
