= Hapoel Bnei Tamra F.C. =

Hapoel Bnei Tamra
- Full name: Hapoel Bnei Tamra Football Club מועדון כדורגל הפועל בני תמרה
- Founded: 1965
- Dissolved: 2010
- 2009–10: Liga Alef North, 14th (Relegated)
Home colours	Away colours

Hapoel Bnei Tamra Football Club (Hebrew: מועדון כדורגל הפועל בני תמרה, Arabic: شباب طمرة) was an Israeli football club based in Tamra. A successor club, F.C. Tzeirei Tamra was established in 2013.

== History ==
The club was founded in the 1965. In 1985–86, the club won Liga Bet North A division and was promoted to Liga Alef (then the third division), but were relegated to Liga Bet in 1988. In the following season, they dropped into Liga Gimel. In 1995, they were promoted back to Liga Bet but were relegated again in 1997.

In 2003, the club returned to Liga Bet. In 2004–05, they won the North B division of Liga Bet, and were promoted to Liga Alef. The following season the club won the North Division of Liga Alef, and was promoted to Liga Artzit. In the 2008–09 season, they were relegated back to Liga Alef. The club finished 14th in Liga Alef North, one place above the relegation zone. However, shortly after the end of the season, the IFA demoted the club to Liga Bet due to involvement in match-fixing. The club did not enter Liga Bet in the following season, and folded.

== Honours ==
=== League ===
Honour	No.	Years
Fourth tier	1	1985–86, 2005–06
Fifth tier	1	1981–82, 2004–05
