= 1978–79 Liga Bet =

Israeli football season

The 1978–79 Liga Bet season saw Hapoel Bnei Nazareth, Hapoel Umm al-Fahm, Hapoel Ramat HaSharon and Beitar Be'er Sheva win their regional divisions and promoted to Liga Alef.

== North Division A ==
Pos	Team	Pld	W	D	L	GF	GA	GD	Pts	Promotion or relegation
1	Hapoel Bnei Nazareth	26	–	–	–	62	16	+46	42	Promoted to Liga Alef
2	Hapoel Safed	26	–	–	–	74	25	+49	39	
3	Maccabi Shefa-'Amr	26	–	–	–	73	35	+38	39	
4	Hapoel Migdal HaEmek	26	–	–	–	60	36	+24	36	
5	Maccabi Hatzor	26	–	–	–	43	42	+1	27	
6	Hapoel Kfar Kama	26	–	–	–	52	50	+2	25	
7	Maccabi Neve Sha'anan	26	–	–	–	39	50	−11	24	
8	Hapoel Hatzor	26	–	–	–	38	50	−12	24	
9	Beitar Kiryat Shmona	26	–	–	–	26	49	−23	22	
10	Maccabi Acre	26	–	–	–	36	57	−21	21	
11	Maccabi Kiryat Bialik	26	–	–	–	40	43	−3	20	
12	Maccabi Tiberias	26	–	–	–	40	59	−19	20	
13	Sektzia Ma'alot	26	–	–	–	32	67	−35	14	Relegated to Liga Gimel
14	Hapoel Sakhnin	26	–	–	–	19	59	−40	9	Relegated to Liga Gimel

== North Division B ==
Pos	Team	Pld	W	D	L	GF	GA	GD	Pts	Promotion or relegation
1	Hapoel Umm al-Fahm	24	–	–	–	47	14	+33	34	Promoted to Liga Alef
2	Hapoel Afula	24	–	–	–	41	26	+15	32	
3	Hapoel Daliyat al-Karmel	24	–	–	–	43	30	+13	31	
4	Maccabi Or Akiva	24	–	–	–	43	31	+12	27	
5	Hapoel Kiryat Yam	24	–	–	–	27	22	+5	26	
6	Maccabi HaSharon Netanya	24	–	–	–	30	32	−2	24	
7	Hapoel Tayibe	24	–	–	–	31	42	−11	22	
8	Hapoel Kafr Sulam	24	–	–	–	35	39	−4	21	
9	Hapoel Aliyah Kfar Saba	24	–	–	–	29	50	−21	21	
10	Hapoel Kafr Qara	24	–	–	–	27	29	−2	20	
11	Hapoel HaTzair Haifa	24	–	–	–	33	39	−6	19	
12	Maccabi Zikhron Ya'akov	24	–	–	–	30	43	−13	18	
13	Hapoel Ein Mahil	24	–	–	–	24	43	−19	15	Relegated to Liga Gimel

Hapoel Beit Eliezer withdrew from the league during the season.

== South Division A ==
Pos	Team	Pld	W	D	L	GF	GA	GD	Pts	Promotion or relegation
1	Hapoel Ramat HaSharon	26	–	–	–	50	23	+27	40	Promoted to Liga Alef
2	Hapoel Azor	26	–	–	–	39	26	+13	31	
3	Hapoel Ganei Tikva	26	–	–	–	33	27	+6	31	
4	Hapoel Mahane Yehuda	26	–	–	–	31	28	+3	31	
5	Hapoel Kfar Shalem	26	–	–	–	29	27	+2	28	
6	Hapoel Tira	26	–	–	–	32	34	−2	28	
7	Maccabi HaShikma Ramat Gan	26	–	–	–	33	29	+4	24	
8	Hapoel Rosh HaAyin	26	–	–	–	27	33	−6	23	
9	Beitar Holon	26	–	–	–	32	29	+3	22	
10	Tzafririm Holon	26	–	–	–	27	30	−3	22	
11	Beitar Jaffa	26	–	–	–	30	35	−5	22	
12	Beitar Herzliya	26	–	–	–	31	39	−8	22	
13	Maccabi Bat Yam	26	–	–	–	27	37	−10	21	Relegated to Liga Gimel
14	Beitar Bat Yam	26	–	–	–	30	54	−24	17	Relegated to Liga Gimel

== South Division B ==
Pos	Team	Pld	W	D	L	GF	GA	GD	Pts	Promotion or relegation
1	Beitar Be'er Sheva	26	–	–	–	56	17	+39	39	Promoted to Liga Alef
2	Maccabi Be'er Sheva	26	–	–	–	52	26	+26	37	
3	Hapoel Merhavim	26	–	–	–	51	27	+24	35	
4	Hapoel Kiryat Malakhi	26	–	–	–	42	35	+7	33	
5	Hapoel Ofakim	26	–	–	–	38	41	−3	28	
6	Maccabi Rehovot	26	–	–	–	42	41	+1	27	
7	Maccabi Ashkelon	26	–	–	–	36	40	−4	27	
8	Hapoel Yeruham	26	–	–	–	34	37	−3	25	
9	Maccabi Shikun HaMizrah	26	–	–	–	31	36	−5	23	
10	Hapoel Gedera	26	–	–	–	38	43	−5	20	
11	Hapoel Be'er Ya'akov	26	–	–	–	45	59	−14	18	
12	Maccabi Ramla	26	–	–	–	27	48	−21	17	
13	Beitar Katamonim	26	–	–	–	22	36	−14	15	Relegated to Liga Gimel
14	Hapoel Bnei Lakhish	26	–	–	–	32	60	−28	15	Relegated to Liga Gimel
