= Hapoel Sha'ariya F.C. =

Hapoel Sha'ariya
- Full name: Hapoel Sha'ariya Football Club
- Founded: 1961
- Dissolved: 1968
- League: Liga Bet South A
- 1966–68: 15th

Hapoel Sha'ariya (Hebrew: הפועל שעריה) was an Israeli football club based in the Sha'ariya neighbourhood of Petah Tikva.

== History ==
The club was founded in 1962 and joined Liga Gimel. In its first year of its existence, the club qualified to the fourth round of the State Cup, forcing a replay on Beitar Tel Aviv, before losing 0–11 in the replay.

In 1964–65, the club finished top of its division and won a promotion to Liga Bet in the promotion playoffs. The club played in Liga Bet for the next two seasons, finishing 11th in its first season in the league and 15th in the next, after which the club folded.

== Honours ==
=== League ===
Honour	No.	Years
Fourth tier	1	1964–65
