= Hapoel Kiryat Gat F.C. =

Israeli football team from Kiryat Gat

(Israel) Hapoel Kiryat Gat הפועל קריית גת
- Full name: Hapoel Kiryat Gat Football Club מועדון כדורגל הפועל קריית גת
- Founded: 1956

Hapoel Kiryat Gat F.C. (Hebrew: הפועל קריית גת) was an Israeli football team based in Kiryat Gat.

== History ==
The club was established in 1956, and started playing in Liga Gimel, in which the club played until winning promotion in 1962. However, the club lasted only one season in Liga Bet and relegated back to Liga Gimel.

In summer 1968 Hapoel branch in Rehovot merged the city's two Hapoel teams, Hapoel Marmorek and Hapoel Rehovot and Hapoel Rehovot's spot in Liga Bet was sold to Hapoel Kiryat Gat, appearing as Hapoel Kiryat Gat/Rehovot for one season, and dropping back to Liga Gimel the following season.

The club promoted back to Liga Bet in 1973, achieving its best ever position, 6th in third tier, in 1973–74. The club played in Liga Bet in 6 of the next 7 seasons (except for a season spent in Liga Gimel), and relegated for the last time at the end of the 1979–80 season. The club played until folding in the mid-1990s. During this period, In 1991, the club set the current senior Israeli record for goals scored in a league match, beating Hapoel Shtulim 25–0.

== Honours ==
=== League ===
Honour	No.	Years
Fourth tier	3	1959–60, 1961–62, 1972–73
Fifth tier	1	1978–79
