= Avraham Sabu =

Israeli footballer

Avraham Sabu אברהם סבו
Personal information
- Full name: Avraham Sabu
- Place of birth: Israel
- Position: Midfielder

Senior career*
Years	Team	Apps	(Gls)
- Beitar Tel Aviv
- Maccabi Netanya
- Beitar Jerusalem
- * Club domestic league appearances and goals

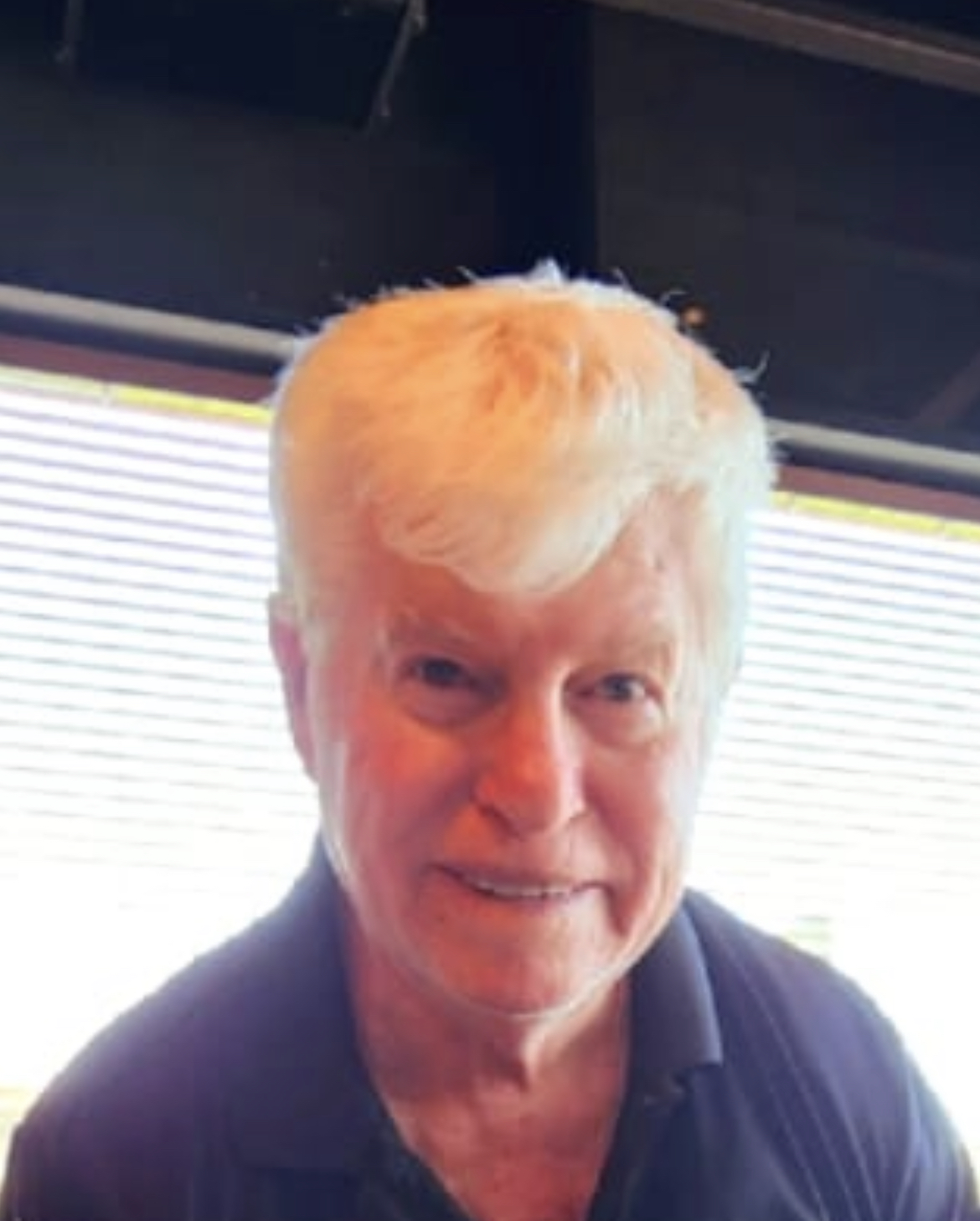
Abraham Sabo on his 76th birthday

Avraham Sabu (Hebrew: אברהם סבו) is a former Israeli footballer who played in Beitar Tel Aviv, Maccabi Netanya and Beitar Jerusalem.

== Honours ==
- Israeli Premier League (1):
  - 1970–71
- Israel State Cup (1):
  - 1976
