= Beitar Yavne F.C. =

Israeli football club

Beitar Yavne
- Full name: Beitar Yavne Football Club מועדון כדורגל בית"ר יבנה
- Founded: 1958; 2013 (Refounded)
- Dissolved: 1997
- Ground: Yavne Municipal Stadium, Yavne
- Capacity: 2,500
- Manager: Shay Hajaj
- League: Liga Bet South B
- 2024–25: Liga Bet South B, 5th
Home colours	Away colours

Beitar Yavne (Hebrew: בית"ר יבנה) is an Israeli football club based in Yavne. The club currently plays in Liga Bet South B division.

== History ==
The club was founded in 1958 and played its entire history in the lower divisions of Israeli football. Beitar reached Liga Bet, the fourth tier, for the first time in the 1985–86 season. In the 1986–87 season, former Israel international and Hapoel Kfar Saba player, Israel Fogel, played briefly for the club. In 1997, the club folded.

16 years later, the club was refounded and joined Liga Gimel for the 2013–14 season. At the end of the season, they won Liga Gimel Central division and were promoted to Liga Bet.

== Honours ==
=== League ===
Honour	No.	Years
Fifth tier	1	2013–14

=== Cups ===
Honour	No.	Years
Liga Gimel divisional State Cup	1	2013–14
