= Waiting period (Six-Day War) =

Lead up to the Six-Day War

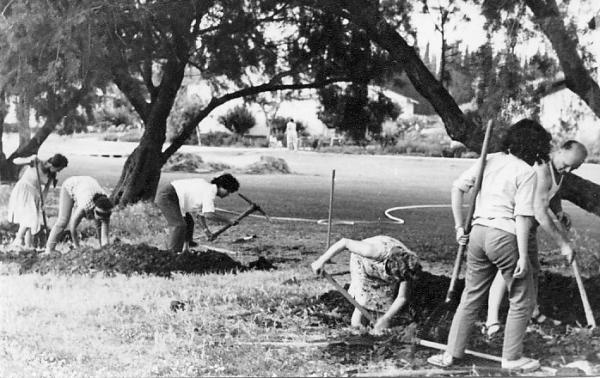
Digging trenches on kibbutz Gan Shmuel before the Six-Day War

The waiting period (Hebrew: תקופת ההמתנה, romanized: Tkufat HaHamtana) was a 3-week interval in the history of Israel, May 15 – June 5, 1967, between the Egyptian crossing of the Suez Canal into the Sinai Peninsula and the outbreak of the Six-Day War.

== History ==
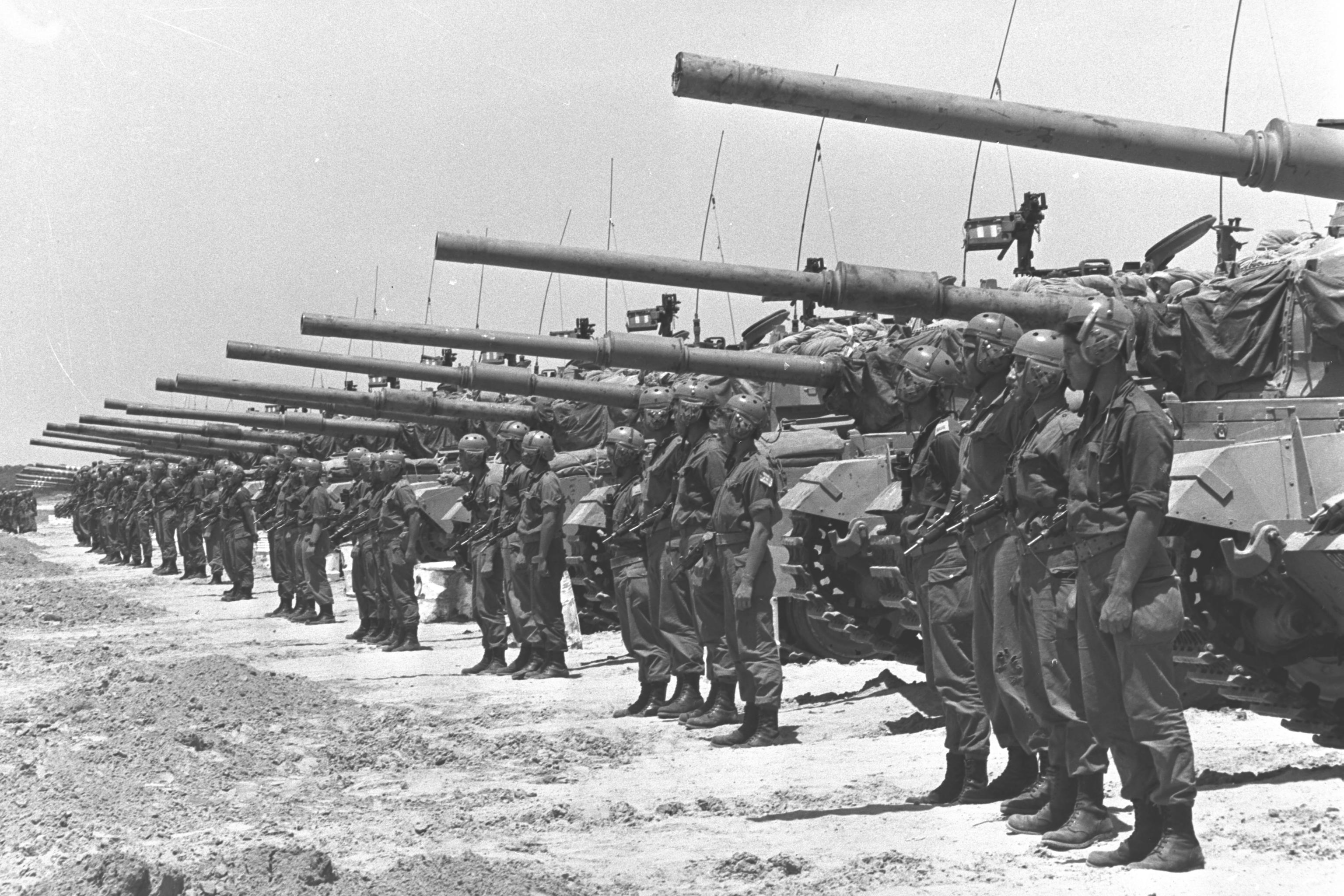
Israeli armored unit stands in the Negev on 20 May

On 13 May 1967, Egyptian president Gamal Abdel Nasser received a Soviet intelligence report which claimed that Israel was massing troops on Syria's border. According to Israeli historian Benny Morris, Nasser verified that the report was false, but still told his people that Israel troops were placed on Syria's border. Subsequently, he took three successive steps that made war virtually inevitable: On 14 May he deployed his troops in Sinai near the border with Israel, on 19 May expelled the UN peacekeepers stationed in the Sinai Peninsula border with Israel, and on 23 May closed the Straits of Tiran to Israeli bound shipping, although he knew that it would be considered a casus belli by Israel. 90% of Israeli oil passed through the Straits of Tiran. Oil tankers that were due to pass through the straits were delayed.

When the UN forces evacuated its troops, Israel military commentators and political officials still believed that Egypt would not open a front against Israel, due to its involvement in the North Yemen Civil War. However, when Nasser declared that his forces were withdrawing from Yemen and making their way to Sinai, Israel drafted every fit man, which led to an economic paralyzation. No emergency was felt on the Jordanian border. Tourists kept crossing the Mandelbaum Gate, although there were reports of Jordanian Legion forces moving from Amman towards the West Bank.

Nasser's move was supported by Moscow, while the United States warned both Israel and Egypt not to take military action.

On 27 May Egypt canceled a planned attack on Israel at the last minute, and on May 30, Jordan and Egypt signed a defense pact. The following day, at Jordan's invitation, the Iraqi army began deploying troops and armored units in Jordan. Any military analyst should have recognized that the arrival of large numbers of Arab troops and Iraqi planes in Jordan would inevitably make Israel anxious to swiftly act against Jordan before these new forces were fully deployed. Israel continued to prepare for war.

Israeli scholar Avner Cohen has argued that this period was also crucial to Israel's nuclear policy, and that the anxiety led Israel to advance towards "operational readiness" of its nuclear option.

== Views of Arab leadership ==
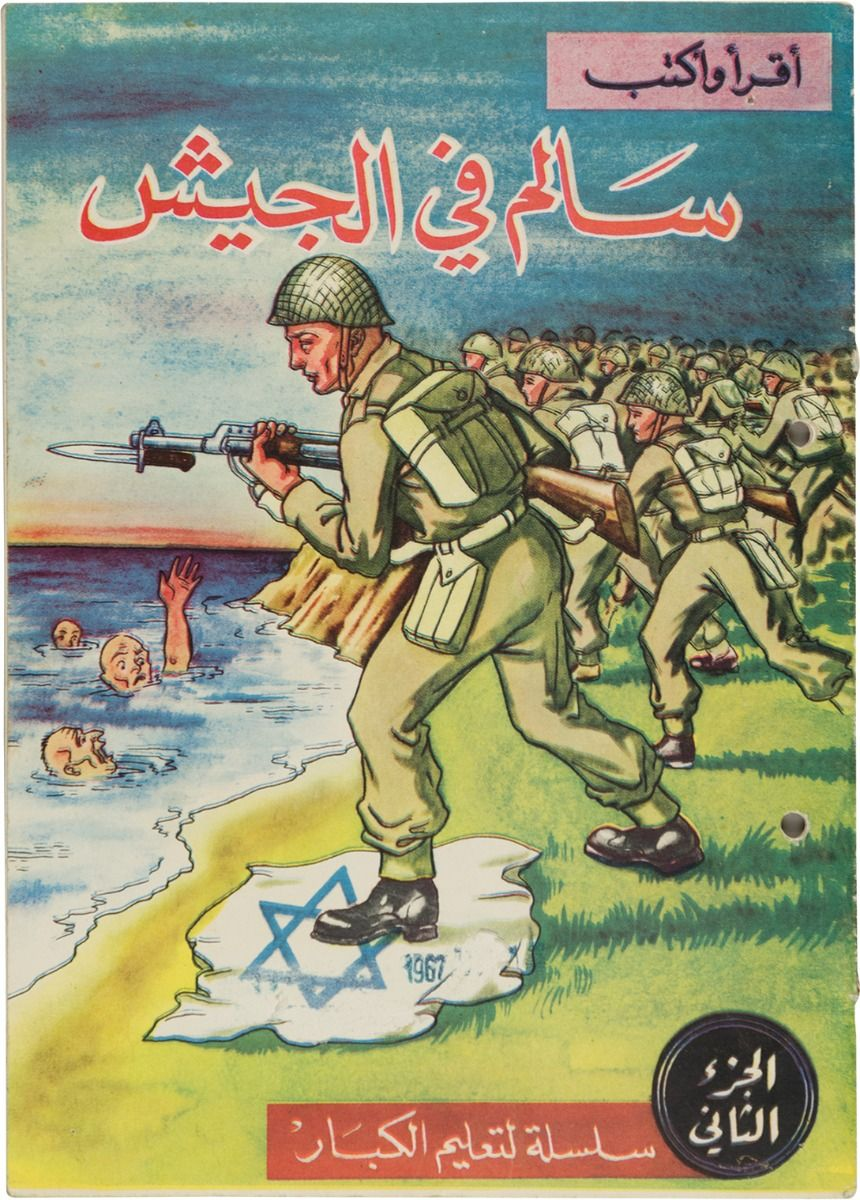
Cover of the Egyptian military magazine Peace in the Army dating from the eve of the Six-Day War, with a cartoon showing Israelis being pushed into the sea.

On 26 May Nasser declared, "If Israel embarks on, an aggression against Syria or Egypt, the battle against Israel will be a general one and not confined to one spot on the Syrian or Egyptian borders. The battle will be a general one and our basic objective will be to destroy Israel."

At the end of May 1967, Nasser claimed in a public speech to have been aware of the Straits of Tiran closure implications: "Taking over Sharm El Sheikh meant confrontation with Israel. It also means that we are ready to enter a general war with Israel. It was not a separate operation."

President Abdul Rahman Arif of Iraq said that "the existence of Israel is an error which must be rectified. This is an opportunity to wipe out the ignominy which has been with us since 1948". In a press conference, president of the PLO Ahmad Shukeiri said it was "possible and even most likely that" the Palestine Liberation Army would strike first; if the Arabs took Israel, it would be unlikely any Jews would survive.

In May 1967, Hafez al-Assad, then Syria's Defense Minister declared: "Our forces are now entirely ready not only to repulse the aggression, but to initiate the act of liberation itself, and to explode the Zionist presence in the Arab homeland. The Syrian Army, with its finger on the trigger, is united... I, as a military man, believe that the time has come to enter into a battle of annihilation."

== Political moves ==
Speaking before the Knesset, Israeli Prime Minister Levi Eshkol tried to calm the situation by assuring the Arab states that Israel was not seeking war.

On May 23, chief of general staff Yitzhak Rabin met with former prime minister David Ben-Gurion to ask for reassurance. Ben-Gurion, however, accused him of putting the country in mortal jeopardy by mobilizing the reserves and openly preparing for war against a coalition of Arab states, saying that at the very least, Rabin should have obtained the support of a foreign power as he himself had done during the Sinai Campaign 11 years earlier. Rabin was shaken by the meeting and took to his bed for 36 hours, in what became known as the 'nicotine poisoning' incident. Rabin turned to Ezer Weizman and asked him to replace him as Chief of Staff. Weizman refused, saying that it would be a severe blow to the IDF.

Meanwhile, Abba Eban went to the United States and met three times with Secretary of State Dean Rusk. However, Washington announced that it would intervene on Israel's behalf only if the USSR joined the fighting. President of the United States Lyndon B. Johnson asked Israel not to start a military operation, promising to provide Israel with oil.

Calls were growing in Jerusalem for unity government, with the National Religious Party calling for an emergency government. Old rivals David Ben-Gurion and Menachem Begin met in Sde Boker, where Begin asked Ben-Gurion to join Eshkol's government. Although Eshkol's Mapai party initially opposed the widening of its government, it eventually changed its mind.

== National unity government ==
On the evening of May 28, Eshkol gave a radio address to the nation. During the preparation of the speech several versions were drafted after Eshkol had proofread it. When he reached the paragraph in which a correction was made, and the words "withdrawing forces" were changed to "moving forces," Eshkol began to hesitate, not understanding that a correction was made. The entire country heard him stammer in front of the live microphone. This address became known as the "stammer address".

On May 29, Haaretz newspaper wrote in its editorial that "Mr. Eshkol is not built to be the prime minister and the security minister in the current situation". Eshkol spoke in the Knesset and tried to calm the public that "it is reasonable to expect that the states that support in the principle of the freedom of sailing, will do and will coordinate an efficient action in order to ensure that the straits and the bay will be open to the passage of the ships of all the nations without discrimination". But the internal pressure continued. On June 1, Eshkol handed over the security portfolio to Moshe Dayan. Gahal representatives Menachem Begin and Yosef Sapir joined the government and were appointed ministers without portfolio. It was the first unity government established in Israel, and in this time was called Memshelet Likud Leumi. Meanwhile, in Tel Aviv and Jerusalem, people began digging trenches and filling sandbags.

On June 2, Eshkol convened the security cabinet along with the IDF's General Staff at the Tel Aviv headquarters. Opposition to an attack came from Mapai's Zalman Aran and the NRP's Haim-Moshe Shapira, who said "I am ready to fight but not to commit suicide." Major-General Motti Hod tried to convince them that an Israeli Air Force attack was necessary. Major-General Matti Peled wondered why Israel was waiting, while Major-General Ariel Sharon said "IDF forces are more prepared than they ever were" to "totally destroy the Egyptian forces". Eshkol remained unconvinced.

On June 4, a cabinet session now led by Dayan, decided to embark on a war. On June 5, at 7:45 AM, the war erupted.
