= 1966–68 Liga Alef =

Liga Alef
- Season: 1966-68
- Champions: North Division - Hapoel Kfar Saba, South Division - Beitar Jerusalem
- Promoted: North Division - Hapoel Kfar Saba, South Division - Beitar Jerusalem
- Relegated: North Division - Hapoel Nahariya, Hapoel Safed, South Division - Beitar Kiryat Ono, Hapoel Kfar Shalem

The 1966–68 Liga Alef season saw Hapoel Kfar Saba (champions of the North Division) and Beitar Jerusalem (champions of the South Division) win the title and promotion to Liga Leumit.

== North Division ==
| Pos | Team | Pld | W | D | L | GF | GA | GD | Pts | Promotion or relegation |
|---|---|---|---|---|---|---|---|---|---|---|
| 1 | Hapoel Kfar Saba | 60 | 45 | 11 | 4 | 150 | 45 | +105 | 101 | Promoted to Liga Leumit |
| 2 | Maccabi Petah Tikva | 60 | 38 | 11 | 11 | 125 | 59 | +66 | 87 | |
| 3 | Hapoel Kiryat Haim | 60 | 22 | 18 | 20 | 78 | 75 | +3 | 62 | |
| 4 | Hapoel Hadera | 60 | 23 | 15 | 22 | 72 | 65 | +7 | 61 | |
| 5 | Hapoel Tiberias | 60 | 25 | 11 | 24 | 90 | 93 | −3 | 61 | |
| 6 | Hapoel Herzliya | 60 | 23 | 14 | 23 | 87 | 77 | +10 | 60 | |
| 7 | Beitar Netanya | 60 | 24 | 10 | 26 | 85 | 96 | −11 | 58 | |
| 8 | Hapoel Acre | 60 | 22 | 12 | 26 | 80 | 97 | −17 | 56 | |
| 9 | Hapoel Kfar Blum | 60 | 19 | 17 | 24 | 83 | 91 | −8 | 55 | |
| 10 | Hapoel Ra'anana | 60 | 21 | 12 | 27 | 103 | 106 | −3 | 54 | |
| 11 | Hapoel Nahliel | 60 | 18 | 18 | 24 | 85 | 97 | −12 | 54 | |
| 12 | Hapoel Bnei Nazareth | 60 | 19 | 15 | 26 | 73 | 98 | −25 | 53 | |
| 13 | Hapoel Netanya | 60 | 19 | 14 | 27 | 78 | 94 | −16 | 52 | |
| 14 | Maccabi Hadera | 60 | 18 | 16 | 26 | 95 | 112 | −17 | 52 | |
| 15 | Hapoel Nahariya | 60 | 20 | 11 | 29 | 77 | 99 | −22 | 51 | Relegated to Liga Bet |
| 16 | Hapoel Safed | 60 | 13 | 12 | 35 | 61 | 118 | −57 | 38 | Relegated to Liga Bet |

== South Division ==
| Pos | Team | Pld | W | D | L | GF | GA | GD | Pts | Promotion or relegation |
|---|---|---|---|---|---|---|---|---|---|---|
| 1 | Beitar Jerusalem | 60 | 47 | 10 | 3 | 161 | 36 | +125 | 104 | Promoted to Liga Leumit |
| 2 | Maccabi Ramat Amidar | 60 | 45 | 8 | 7 | 151 | 43 | +108 | 98 | |
| 3 | Hapoel Marmorek | 60 | 31 | 19 | 10 | 98 | 67 | +31 | 81 | |
| 4 | Beitar Tel Aviv | 60 | 23 | 16 | 21 | 64 | 67 | −3 | 62 | |
| 5 | Hapoel Lod | 60 | 23 | 13 | 24 | 97 | 78 | +19 | 59 | |
| 6 | Hapoel Holon | 60 | 20 | 18 | 22 | 70 | 74 | −4 | 58 | |
| 7 | Beitar Ramla | 60 | 23 | 10 | 27 | 95 | 99 | −4 | 56 | |
| 8 | Hapoel Kiryat Ono | 60 | 18 | 20 | 22 | 80 | 88 | −8 | 56 | |
| 9 | Hapoel Rishon LeZion | 60 | 20 | 15 | 25 | 84 | 95 | −11 | 55 | |
| 10 | Hapoel Ashkelon | 60 | 22 | 7 | 31 | 69 | 93 | −24 | 51 | |
| 11 | Beitar Be'er Sheva | 60 | 19 | 13 | 28 | 72 | 104 | −32 | 51 | |
| 12 | Hapoel Be'er Ya'akov | 60 | 18 | 15 | 27 | 73 | 106 | −33 | 51 | |
| 13 | Beitar Lod | 60 | 17 | 16 | 27 | 64 | 109 | −45 | 50 | |
| 14 | Maccabi Holon | 60 | 15 | 18 | 27 | 66 | 88 | −22 | 48 | |
| 15 | Beitar Kiryat Ono | 61 | 20 | 6 | 35 | 68 | 115 | −47 | 46 | Relegated to Liga Bet |
| 16 | Hapoel Kfar Shalem | 60 | 10 | 12 | 38 | 50 | 100 | −50 | 32 | Relegated to Liga Bet |

== See also ==
- 1966–68 Liga Leumit
