= 1968–69 Liga Alef =

Liga Alef
- Season: 1968–69
- Champions: Maccabi Petah Tikva (North); Beitar Tel Aviv (South)
- Promoted: Maccabi Petah Tikva (North); Beitar Tel Aviv (South)
- Relegated: Hapoel Ra'anana (North); Hapoel Kfar Blum (North); Hapoel Yehud (South); Maccabi Holon (South)

The 1968–69 Liga Alef season saw Maccabi Petah Tikva (champions of the North Division) and Beitar Tel Aviv (champions of the South Division) win the title and promotion to Liga Leumit.

== North Division ==
Pos	Team	Pld	W	D	L	GF	GA	GD	Pts	Promotion or relegation
1	Maccabi Petah Tikva	30	22	7	1	63	13	+50	51	Promoted to Liga Leumit
2	Hapoel Hadera	30	16	9	5	54	26	+28	41	
3	Hapoel Herzliya	30	14	11	5	46	23	+23	39	
4	Hapoel Nahliel	30	13	7	10	66	50	+16	33	
5	Hapoel Acre	30	12	9	9	43	34	+9	33	
6	Beitar Netanya	30	12	9	9	43	34	+9	33	
7	Hapoel Tiberias	30	11	7	12	38	51	−13	29	
8	Hapoel Netanya	30	9	9	12	39	49	−10	27	
9	Hapoel Bnei Nazareth	30	8	10	12	34	38	−4	26	
10	Maccabi Herzliya	30	8	10	12	27	31	−4	26	
11	Hapoel Kiryat Shmona	30	10	6	14	30	40	−10	26	
12	Maccabi Hadera	30	9	8	13	31	62	−31	26	
13	Hapoel Mahane Yehuda	30	7	11	12	34	47	−13	25	
14	Hapoel Kiryat Haim	30	8	8	14	38	49	−11	24	
15	Hapoel Ra'anana	30	8	6	16	43	66	−23	22	Relegated to Liga Bet
16	Hapoel Kfar Blum	30	7	6	17	48	62	−14	20	Relegated to Liga Bet

== South Division ==
Pos	Team	Pld	W	D	L	GF	GA	GD	Pts	Promotion or relegation
1	Beitar Tel Aviv	30	22	5	3	64	21	+43	49	Promoted to Liga Leumit
2	Maccabi Ramat Amidar	30	20	7	3	69	21	+48	47	
3	Hapoel Marmorek	30	16	8	6	62	28	+34	40	
4	Hapoel Holon	30	15	7	8	53	41	+12	37	
5	Hapoel Rishon LeZion	30	10	12	8	41	43	−2	32	
6	Hapoel Lod	30	13	5	12	42	42	0	31	
7	Hapoel Be'er Ya'akov	30	12	7	11	45	49	−4	31	
8	Beitar Ramla	30	12	7	11	42	46	−4	31	
9	Hapoel Kiryat Ono	30	9	10	11	60	59	+1	28	
10	SK Nes Tziona	30	9	8	13	58	53	+5	26	
11	Hapoel Ashkelon	30	9	7	14	48	55	−7	25	
12	Beitar Lod	30	6	12	12	28	55	−27	24	
13	Beitar Be'er Sheva	30	7	8	15	32	45	−13	22	
14	Hapoel Sderot	30	4	12	14	24	60	−36	20	
15	Hapoel Yehud	30	5	9	16	31	54	−23	19	Relegated to Liga Bet
16	Maccabi Holon	30	2	10	18	20	57	−37	14	Relegated to Liga Bet
