= 1962–63 Liga Bet =

Israeli football season

The 1962–63 Liga Bet season saw Hapoel Acre, Hapoel Nahliel, YMCA Jerusalem and SK Nes Tziona win their regional divisions and promoted to Liga Alef.

Further twelve teams which have finished between second and fourth were also promoted, with one more promotion spot decided by a promotion play-off, as Liga Alef expanded from one to two regional divisions.

== North Division A ==
Pos	Team	Pld	W	D	L	GF	GA	GD	Pts	Promotion or relegation
1	Hapoel Acre	30	–	–	–	81	18	+63	50	Promoted to Liga Alef
2	Hapoel Kfar Blum	30	–	–	–	71	32	+39	47	Promoted to Liga Alef
3	Hapoel Nahariya	30	–	–	–	70	35	+35	42	Promoted to Liga Alef
4	Maccabi Zikhron Ya'akov	30	–	–	–	76	45	+31	41	Promoted to Liga Alef
5	Beitar Haifa	30	–	–	–	66	55	+11	40	Promotion play-offs
6	Hapoel Afula	30	–	–	–	70	52	+18	34	
7	Beitar Kiryat Shmona	30	–	–	–	34	29	+5	32	
8	Hapoel Kiryat Shmona	30	–	–	–	38	47	−9	31	
9	Hapoel HaMechonit	30	–	–	–	47	42	+5	30	
10	A.S. Kiryat Bialik	30	–	–	–	49	55	−6	22	
11	Beitar Binyamina	30	–	–	–	58	72	−14	22	
12	Hapoel Kfar Ata	30	–	–	–	54	89	−35	22	
13	Hapoel Bnei Nazareth	30	–	–	–	43	59	−16	21	
14	Hapoel Ramat David	30	–	–	–	36	90	−54	16	
15	Hapoel Atlit	30	–	–	–	32	82	−50	13	
16	Hapoel Yagur	30	–	–	–	31	87	−56	11	Relegated to Liga Gimel

== North Division B ==
Pos	Team	Pld	W	D	L	GF	GA	GD	Pts	Promotion or relegation
1	Hapoel Nahliel	30	–	–	–	73	18	+55	45	Promoted to Liga Alef
2	Hapoel Kiryat Ono	30	–	–	–	46	21	+25	45	Promoted to Liga Alef
3	Hapoel Givat Haim	30	–	–	–	88	40	+48	42	Promoted to Liga Alef
4	Maccabi Hadera	30	–	–	–	76	44	+32	40	Promoted to Liga Alef
5	Hapoel Herzliya	30	–	–	–	65	33	+32	39	Promotion play-offs
6	Hapoel Netanya	30	–	–	–	70	49	+21	32	
7	Hapoel Pardes Hanna	30	–	–	–	46	48	−2	31	
8	Hapoel Ra'anana	30	–	–	–	50	68	−18	27	
9	Hapoel Dora Netanya	30	–	–	–	35	54	−19	26	
10	Maccabi Neve Shalom	30	–	–	–	47	66	−19	25	
11	Beitar Kiryat Ono	30	–	–	–	48	77	−29	23	
12	Hapoel Ganei Tikva	30	–	–	–	46	59	−13	22	
13	Maccabi Pardes Hanna	30	–	–	–	29	47	−18	21	
14	Beitar Mahane Yehuda	30	–	–	–	40	68	−28	21	
15	Hapoel Givat Olga	30	–	–	–	36	60	−24	20	
16	Beitar Beit Lid	30	–	–	–	32	81	−49	19	Relegated to Liga Gimel

== South Division A ==
Pos	Team	Pld	W	D	L	GF	GA	GD	Pts	Promotion or relegation
1	YMCA Jerusalem	30	–	–	–	82	35	+47	47	Promoted to Liga Alef
2	Maccabi Ramat Amidar	30	–	–	–	53	24	+29	42	Promoted to Liga Alef
3	Maccabi Shmuel Tel Aviv	30	–	–	–	56	31	+25	41	Promoted to Liga Alef
4	Hapoel Giv'atayim	30	–	–	–	52	36	+16	37	Promoted to Liga Alef
5	Beitar Holon	30	–	–	–	65	44	+21	36	Promotion play-offs
6	Hapoel Yehud	30	–	–	–	51	37	+14	35	
7	Maccabi Bat Yam	30	–	–	–	48	36	+12	34	
8	Hapoel HaTzafon Tel Aviv	30	–	–	–	55	50	+5	30	
9	Hapoel HaDarom Kiryat Shalom	30	–	–	–	55	63	−8	30	
10	Hapoel Rehovot	30	–	–	–	68	59	+9	26	
11	Beitar Lod	30	–	–	–	53	71	−18	25	
12	Hapoel Bat Yam	30	–	–	–	39	54	−15	24	
13	Hapoel Azor	30	–	–	–	43	68	−25	22	
14	Maccabi Ramat Gan	30	–	–	–	38	68	−30	22	
15	Hapoel Ya'akov Kfar Saba	30	–	–	–	57	62	−5	21	
16	ASA Jerusalem	30	–	–	–	22	94	−72	9	Relegated to Liga Gimel

== South Division B ==
Pos	Team	Pld	W	D	L	GF	GA	GD	Pts	Promotion or relegation
1	SK Nes Tziona	30	–	–	–	53	22	+31	45	Promoted to Liga Alef
2	Beitar Ramla	30	–	–	–	82	33	+49	42	Promoted to Liga Alef
3	Hapoel Marmorek	30	–	–	–	71	39	+32	41	Promoted to Liga Alef
4	Hapoel Rishon LeZion	30	–	–	–	78	36	+42	39	Promoted to Liga Alef
5	Hapoel Sderot	30	–	–	–	65	52	+13	36	Promotion play-offs
6	Beitar Be'er Sheva	30	–	–	–	49	38	+11	35	
7	Hapoel Ashkelon	30	–	–	–	65	42	+23	34	
8	Maccabi Holon	30	–	–	–	63	59	+4	28	
9	Hapoel Or Yehuda	30	–	–	–	55	77	−22	28	
10	Maccabi Rehovot	30	–	–	–	52	54	−2	26	
11	Hapoel Eilat	30	–	–	–	43	61	−18	23	
12	Harari Tel Aviv	30	–	–	–	42	66	−24	23	
13	Hapoel Be'er Ya'akov	30	–	–	–	32	57	−25	23	
14	Hapoel Ofakim	30	–	–	–	35	56	−21	22	
15	Hapoel Merhavim	30	–	–	–	46	69	−23	22	
16	Hapoel Kiryat Gat	30	–	–	–	34	91	−57	15	Relegated to Liga Gimel

== Promotion play-offs ==
A promotion-play off was played between all the teams which have finished in the 5th place in their respective regional division. the play-off format was of semi-finals and final match, played in neutral venue. the play-offs winner set to be promoted to Liga Alef.

Semi-final:

15 October 1963

Hapoel Herzliya	5 – 0	Beitar Holon

15 October 1963

Beitar Haifa	4 – 1	Hapoel Sderot

Final:

22 October 1963

Hapoel Herzliya	6 – 1	Beitar Haifa

Maccabi Hadera Stadium
