= Hapoel Sde Nahum F.C. =

Hapoel Sde Nahum
- Full name: Hapoel Sde Nahum Football Club הפועל שדה נחום
- Founded: 1937
- Dissolved: 1971
- League: Liga Bet North A
- 1968–69: 12th

Hapoel Sde Nahum (Hebrew: הפועל שדה נחום) was an Israeli football club based in Kibbutz Sde Nahum.

== History ==
The club, the local Hapoel branch in the kibbutz, was founded along with the kibbutz itself, in 1937, and played in local leagues and competitions in its early years, joining the IFA leagues only in the 1960s. In 1964–65, the club topped its Liga Gimel division and qualified to the promotion playoffs, once again topping the mini-league and promoting to Liga Bet.

In summer 1969, the club merged with nearby Hapoel Beit She'an in order to prevent Beit She'an's relegation to Liga Gimel (as Hapoel Beit She'an finished bottom of Liga Bet). The merged club played for one season as Hapoel Sde Nahum/Beit She'an, and the merger was cancelled at the end of the season, after which the club merged with Hapoel Afikim, although Hapoel Beit She'an kept the unified name for one more season.

== Honours ==
=== League ===
Honour	No.	Years
Fourth tier	1	1964–65

=== Other ===
Honour	No.	Years
Kibbutz Football Championship	1	1966
