= 1966–68 Liga Leumit =

Liga Leumit
- Season: 1966–68
- Champions: Maccabi Tel Aviv; 10th title
- Relegated: SK Nes Tziona; Hapoel Mahane Yehuda
- Top goalscorer: Mordechai Spiegler (38)

The 1966–68 Liga Leumit season was the thirteenth in the league's history, and is notable for the Israel Football Association's decision to play it over two years as a play to combat corruption and increasing violence at matches. The sixteen teams played each other four times during the season, effectively combining two seasons into one, leading it to be known as the double season (Hebrew: העונה הכפולה, HaOna HaKfula).

At the end of the season SK Nes Tziona and Hapoel Mahane Yehuda were relegated to Liga Alef, making it Mahane Yehuda's last top flight season to date. They were replaced by Hapoel Kfar Saba and Beitar Jerusalem. As champions, Maccabi Tel Aviv entered the 1969 Asian Club Championship, which they won. Maccabi Netanya's Mordechai Spiegler was the season's top scorer with 38 goals - 15 during 1966–67 and 23 in 1967–68.

== Background ==
The season began with a protests from relegated players, with the uproar reaching as far as the Knesset. In an attempt to restore order to the game and solve the issues raised, the IFA decided to spread the league games over two years instead of one. The main objectives were to put an end to the riots on the field, reducing trouble at matches and improve the quality of play, as well as infusing new blood into teams by alleviating the immediate fear of relegation.

The double season format involved all the Maccabi (Haifa, Maccabi Jaffa, Netanya, Sha'arayim and Tel Aviv) and Hapoel (Be'er Sheva, Haifa, Jerusalem, Mahane Yehuda, Petah Tikva, Ramat Gan and Tel Aviv) teams playing amongst themselves at the start of the season, and only later playing between the two groups of clubs. This was aimed at minimising the possibilities for match-fixing by teams affiliated to the same organisation at the end of the season. However, despite the drastic solution of playing a double season, the objectives were not considered to have been achieved.

== League table ==
Pos	Team	Pld	W	D	L	GF	GA	GD	Pts	Qualification or relegation
1	Maccabi Tel Aviv	60	30	18	12	88	50	+38	78	Qualified for Asian Club Championship
2	Hapoel Petah Tikva	60	27	21	12	72	48	+24	75	
3	Hapoel Haifa	60	27	16	17	72	47	+25	70	
4	Hapoel Tel Aviv	60	24	21	15	80	55	+25	69	
5	Maccabi Haifa	60	26	15	19	55	43	+12	67	
6	Hapoel Jerusalem	60	24	18	18	66	55	+11	66	
7	Bnei Yehuda	60	20	24	16	54	49	+5	64	
8	Maccabi Netanya	60	20	20	20	82	68	+14	60	
9	Hapoel Be'er Sheva	60	21	18	21	71	62	+9	60	
10	Hakoah Ramat Gan	60	22	16	22	66	78	−12	60	
11	Hapoel Ramat Gan	60	15	24	21	65	69	−4	54	
12	Maccabi Jaffa	60	17	19	24	50	59	−9	53	
13	Maccabi Sha'arayim	60	14	24	22	49	72	−23	52	
14	Shimshon Tel Aviv	60	14	23	23	65	80	−15	51	
15	Hapoel Mahane Yehuda	60	13	23	24	51	82	−31	49	Relegated to Liga Alef
16	SK Nes Tziona	60	8	16	36	54	123	−69	32	Relegated to Liga Alef

Source: RSSSF

== Results ==
=== Rounds 1–30 ===
Home \ Away	BnY	HAR	HBS	HHA	HJE	HMY	HPT	HRG	HTA	MHA	MJA	MNE	MSH	MTA	STA	SNT
Bnei Yehuda	—	2–1	0–0	0–1	0–0	2–2	2–0	1–1	1–0	0–1	1–0	2–2	1–1	0–0	0–0	0–0
Hakoah Ramat Gan	1–0	—	1–0	3–2	1–0	0–0	0–0	0–1	3–0	0–1	0–1	1–2	2–1	1–3	1–0	0–0
Hapoel Be'er Sheva	1–1	2–0	—	1–0	2–0	4–0	3–0	2–1	2–1	1–0	0–0	0–0	0–1	2–1	0–0	0–1
Hapoel Haifa	1–0	1–2	0–2	—	2–0	4–0	3–0	1–1	1–1	1–1	0–0	1–0	0–0	1–1	2–2	2–1
Hapoel Jerusalem	1–2	2–0	1–0	1–0	—	0–0	0–0	0–0	0–3	0–1	1–0	3–2	0–0	1–3	2–1	0–0
Hapoel Mahane Yehuda	1–1	1–1	3–1	1–0	1–1	—	1–1	1–1	0–0	2–1	1–1	4–3	1–1	0–0	0–0	1–2
Hapoel Petah Tikva	0–1	3–0	3–0	0–0	1–0	2–0	—	2–2	1–0	0–0	1–0	1–0	1–0	2–2	0–0	4–0
Hapoel Ramat Gan	0–0	4–1	0–0	3–1	1–3	2–2	1–1	—	1–2	1–1	0–2	3–1	1–0	0–1	0–1	2–1
Hapoel Tel Aviv	2–0	1–1	2–4	0–1	2–1	1–0	0–0	2–1	—	1–1	3–0	0–0	1–1	2–2	0–2	2–0
Maccabi Haifa	1–0	1–2	1–3	0–1	2–0	1–0	0–1	1–0	0–0	—	0–2	2–1	2–1	1–0	1–0	1–1
Maccabi Jaffa	0–1	2–0	2–1	0–1	0–1	1–2	1–3	1–1	0–1	1–0	—	1–1	0–0	1–3	0–0	2–0
Maccabi Netanya	1–1	0–0	2–0	0–2	0–2	0–1	2–0	0–0	1–2	0–2	1–0	—	5–0	1–2	3–1	2–0
Maccabi Sha'arayim	1–1	0–0	1–3	1–1	1–1	1–1	1–5	1–1	0–0	1–3	1–0	2–0	—	1–1	1–1	0–0
Maccabi Tel Aviv	4–2	2–2	0–3	0–2	1–0	1–0	4–1	0–0	2–1	0–0	1–2	5–0	1–0	—	3–1	1–0
Shimshon Tel Aviv	0–0	1–3	5–1	0–1	2–2	5–1	0–3	2–1	1–1	0–1	1–1	0–3	0–1	0–4	—	1–0
SK Nes Tziona	2–2	1–3	1–1	0–2	1–1	1–2	3–0	0–1	3–3	1–2	0–1	1–0	0–2	2–2	0–0	—

Legend: Blue = home team win; Yellow = draw; Red = away team win.

=== Rounds 31–60 ===
Home \ Away	BnY	HAR	HBS	HHA	HJE	HMY	HPT	HRG	HTA	MHA	MJA	MNE	MSH	MTA	STA	SNT
Bnei Yehuda	—	1–0	2–0	0–0	2–0	3–1	0–1	2–1	1–2	2–0	3–2	1–0	1–4	1–0	0–1	3–0
Hakoah Ramat Gan	2–1	—	2–0	1–0	4–0	0–0	1–1	1–1	0–0	0–0	0–1	3–3	0–1	2–5	1–0	2–0
Hapoel Be'er Sheva	1–1	4–0	—	2–3	1–1	1–0	2–0	0–0	0–1	2–0	0–0	1–1	1–2	0–0	0–0	3–0
Hapoel Haifa	0–0	1–2	2–0	—	0–1	4–0	1–1	1–0	0–0	1–0	0–2	1–0	3–0	0–1	0–1	6–1
Hapoel Jerusalem	1–0	5–2	2–1	3–1	—	2–0	0–0	1–0	3–0	0–2	2–1	1–1	3–0	0–1	2–0	3–0
Hapoel Mahane Yehuda	0–1	2–0	0–3	0–4	1–0	—	0–1	5–2	0–0	0–1	0–0	0–0	1–1	0–1	0–1	6–2
Hapoel Petah Tikva	1–1	1–1	3–2	4–1	0–0	0–0	—	1–0	2–2	1–0	2–1	0–1	1–0	1–1	1–0	4–1
Hapoel Ramat Gan	1–1	5–0	2–1	1–1	2–0	0–0	1–0	—	1–3	1–1	2–1	1–1	0–1	3–2	1–2	4–1
Hapoel Tel Aviv	1–0	6–0	1–0	0–1	1–1	4–0	0–1	1–1	—	0–1	0–2	0–1	1–3	1–0	4–2	8–3
Maccabi Haifa	0–1	0–0	2–0	0–1	1–2	3–0	0–1	0–0	0–0	—	1–1	0–1	2–0	1–0	1–1	2–0
Maccabi Jaffa	0–0	1–0	1–1	0–0	0–2	1–1	1–0	2–0	1–2	0–1	—	1–4	1–0	1–1	1–0	1–3
Maccabi Netanya	2–0	1–2	2–2	2–0	1–1	1–2	1–1	3–0	0–0	0–0	4–3	—	3–0	2–1	3–1	2–2
Maccabi Sha'arayim	2–0	0–2	2–2	0–1	1–1	1–0	2–6	1–2	0–2	2–0	0–0	1–1	—	0–2	1–1	1–2
Maccabi Tel Aviv	0–1	2–1	3–0	1–2	1–0	1–0	2–0	0–0	0–0	4–1	2–0	1–0	0–0	—	1–1	2–1
Shimshon Tel Aviv	1–1	1–3	2–2	1–1	0–0	4–0	0–1	3–2	0–3	1–4	1–1	2–7	0–0	0–0	—	7–3
SK Nes Tziona	0–0	1–4	0–1	2–1	2–5	1–3	0–0	2–0	1–3	0–2	1–1	1–1	0–1	2–3	0–4	—

Legend: Blue = home team win; Yellow = draw; Red = away team win.
