= Hapoel Bnei Nazareth F.C. =

Hapoel Bnei Nazareth
- Full name: Hapoel Bnei Nazareth Football Club הפועל בני נצרת
- Founded: 1959
- Dissolved: 2015
- Ground: Ilut Training Ground, Ilut
- 2013–14: Liga Gimel Jezreel, 14th
Home colours	Away colours

Hapoel Bnei Nazareth (Hebrew: הפועל בני נצרת), (Arabic: شباب الناصرة) was an Israeli football club based in Nazareth. The club is currently in Liga Gimel Jezreel division.

== History ==
The club was founded in 1959 and joined Liga Gimel of the Israel Football Association In 1960. In the 1962–63 season, the club have reached Liga Bet, the third tier of Israeli football at the time and in the following season, finished third in Liga Bet North A division and were promoted to Liga Alef following a victory of 8–0 against Beitar Kiryat Shmona, in front of more than 6,000 spectators. Thus, they became the second Arab-Israeli club to reach the second tier of Israeli football after Ahva Notzrit Haifa, which have played in the second tier until 1956.

The club have played eleven consecutive seasons in the second tier, with their best placing was the ninth place in Liga Alef North division in both 1968–69 and 1970–71 seasons. In 1976, following the creation of Liga Artzit, Liga Alef became the third tier of Israeli football, where the club continued to play after they finished tenth at the 1975–76 season. In the 1977–78 season the club finished second bottom, and relegated to Liga Bet (now the fourth tier). The club made an immediate return to Liga Alef, after they won Liga Bet North division in the following season. after another relegation in the 1984–85 season, the club bounced back to Liga Alef two seasons later, following a victory of 2–0 against Maccabi Acre in a decisive match which was held in Daliyat al-Karmel. Bnei Nazareth played in Liga Alef until the 1989–90 season, in which they finished second bottom and relegated to Liga Bet.

In the 2003–04 season, the club finished second bottom in Liga Bet North B division and relegated to Liga Gimel, the lowest tier of Israeli football.

In the 2014–15 season of Liga Gimel Jezreel division, the club was punished with suspension of activity by the Israel Football Association and eventually folded.

== Honours ==
=== League ===
Honour	No.	Years
Fourth tier	3	1961–62, 1978–79, 1986–87
