= Beitar Holon F.C. =

Beitar Holon
- Full name: Beitar Holon City Football Club בית"ר חולון סיטי
- Founded: 1949
- Dissolved: 2002
- 2001–02: Liga Bet North A, 14th (Relegated)
Home colours	Away colours

Beitar Holon (Hebrew: בית"ר חולון) was an Israeli football club based in Holon.

== History ==
The club was founded in 1949 and played mostly in the lower divisions of Israeli football.

In 1959, the club was promoted to the third tier, Liga Bet, as that league was expanded to 64 teams, divided in 4 divisions. In 1962–63, the season in which the top four clubs of each Liga Bet division were promoted to the second tier, Liga Alef, the club finished fifth in the South A division, only one point short from historic promotion, and went to compete in the Promotion play-offs, where they lost in the semi-final 0–5 to Hapoel Herzliya, in a match which was abandoned at the 61st minute, due to unruly behavior of Beitar players. The club did not recover, as in the following season, they finished second bottom in the division and relegated to Liga Gimel. However, in the 1964–65 season, Beitar won Liga Gimel Jaffa division, and secured their immediate return to Liga Bet, after beating Hapoel Yeruham 5–1 at the last match of the Promotion play-offs. Beitar continued to play in Liga Bet (which became the fourth tier in 1976) until the end of the 1979–80 season, where they finished second bottom in the South A division and relegated to Liga Gimel.

The club's last title came at the 1999–2000 season, when they won Liga Gimel Tel Aviv division, and were promoted to Liga Bet (the fifth tier from 1999 to 2009). In the 2001–02 season, the club finished 14th in the South A division, relegated to Liga Gimel and eventually folded. Following the club's dissolution, its management and players moved for fellow local club, Otzma F.C. Holon.

== Honours ==
=== League ===
Honour	No.	Years
Fourth tier	1	1964–65
Sixth tier	1	1999–2000
