= Hapoel Sderot F.C. =

Hapoel Sderot
- Full name: Hapoel Sderot Football Club הפועל שדרות
- Founded: 1957; 2018
- Ground: Sderot Ground, Sderot
- League: Liga Bet
- 2023–24: Liga Gimel South, 8th

Hapoel Sderot (Hebrew: הפועל שדרות) is an Israeli football club based in Sderot which plays in the Liga Bet.

== History ==
The club was founded in 1957 and played mostly in the lower divisions of Israeli football. At the end of the 1961–62 season, Sderot were promoted to Liga Bet, the third tier of Israeli football at the time, after they finished runners-up in the Promotion play-offs for Liga Gimel clubs. In the 1962–63 season, they finished fifth in Liga Bet South B division and qualified for the Promotion play-offs, where they were beaten 1–4 by Beitar Haifa. In the "double season" of 1966–68, the club won the South B division, and achieved promotion for the first time in their history to Liga Alef, then the second tier of Israeli football.

In 1968–69, the first season in which the club played in Liga Alef, the club struggled and found itself near the bottom of the South division table for most of the season. With only two matches remaining, the club was on the brink of relegation as it sat inside the bottom two. However, Sderot ensured their place in Liga Alef, after they defeated their opponents in the relegation battle, Hapoel Yehud, by a result of 1–0, and needed only one point in their last match of the season against Beitar Ramla, which they achieved, following a goalless draw.

In the following season, the club finished bottom and relegated to Liga Bet. Two seasons later, they suffered further relegation, this time to Liga Gimel, after finished bottom of Liga Bet South B division with only four points. Although the club returned to Liga Bet (now as the fourth tier), in the 1980–81 season, where they finished runners-up, a feat which they repeated in the 1983–84 season, the club failed to achieve promotion to Liga Alef and eventually folded in 1992.

In June 2018 the refounded.

== Honours ==
=== League ===
Honour	No.	Years
Third tier	1	1966–68
Fourth tier	1	1960–61
Fifth tier	1	1979–80
