= 1959–60 in Israeli football =

Football in Israel
- Season: 1959–60

Men's football
- Liga Leumit: Hapoel Petah Tikva
- Liga Alef: Shimshon Tel Aviv
- Liga Bet: Hapoel HaMechonit; Hapoel Herzliya; Hapoel Lod; Maccabi Sha'arayim
- State Cup: Maccabi Tel Aviv

The 1959–60 season was the 12th season of competitive football in Israel and the 34th season under the Israeli Football Association, established in 1928, during the British Mandate.

== Review and Events ==
- The national team was involved in two qualifying campaigns, for the 1960 Olympics and for the 1960 AFC Asian Cup. The team won its group in the 1960 AFC Asian Cup qualification and qualified for the main competition, held in October 1960. In the Olympic qualifications, the national team finished second on goal difference, behind the eventual competition winners, Yugoslavia.

== Domestic leagues ==
=== Promotion and relegation ===
The following promotions and relegations took place at the end of the season:

Promoted to Liga Leumit

- Shimshon Tel Aviv

Promoted to Liga Alef

- Maccabi Sha'arayim
- Hapoel Herzliya

Promoted to Liga Bet

- Beitar Haifa
- Hapoel Yagur
- Hapoel Geva
- Hapoel Pardesiya
- Hapoel Karkur
- Hapoel HaDarom Tel Aviv
- Hapoel Zichronot
- Maccabi Holon
- Hapoel Eilat

Relegated from Liga Leumit

- Hapoel Ramat Gan

Relegated from Liga Alef

- Maccabi Rehovot
- Hapoel Netanya

Relegated from Liga Bet

- Hapoel Tirat HaCarmel
- Maccabi Tiberias
- Hapoel Even Yehuda ^{1}
- Hapoel Beit Lid
- Hapoel Tel Mond
- Hapoel HaTzafon Jerusalem
- Hakochav Or Yehuda
- Hapoel Shmuel Be'er Sheva
- Hapoel Kiryat Malakhi

1. Hapoel Even Yehuda withdrew from the league at the end of the season and was replaced by a club from Liga Gimel.

== Domestic cups ==
=== Israel State Cup ===
The 1958–59 Israel State Cup started during the previous season, but was carried over the summer break and finished with the final on 19 November 1959, in which Maccabi Tel Aviv defeated Hapoel Petah Tikva 4–3.

On 30 January 1960, the next season's competition began, and once again carried over to the next season.

== National Teams ==
=== National team ===
==== 1960 Asian Cup qualification – Western Zone ====
Team	Pld	W	D	L	GF	GA	GD	Pts
Israel	6	3	2	1	10	8	+2	8
Iran	6	3	1	2	12	10	+2	7
Pakistan	6	2	1	3	8	10	−2	5
India	6	2	0	4	7	9	−2	4

==== Olympic qualifications – Europe Group 4 ====
Pos	Team	Pld	W	D	L	GF	GA	GD	Pts	Qualification	Yugoslavia	Israel	Greece
1	Yugoslavia	4	2	1	1	12	4	+8	5	Qualification for 1960 Summer Olympics	—	1–2	4–0
2	Israel	4	2	1	1	7	6	+1	5		2–2	—	2–1
3	Greece	4	1	0	3	3	12	−9	2		0–5	2–1	—

Source: RSSSF

==== 1959–60 matches ====
18 October 1959 Ol. Q	Israel	2–2	Yugoslavia	Ramat Gan
	Stelmach 64', 73'		Kostić 7', 76'	Stadium: Ramat Gan Stadium; Attendance: 50,000; Referee: (Turkey) Gönül

29 November 1959 Friendly	Israel	1–1	Poland	Ramat Gan
	Tish 45'	Report	Pohl 86'	Stadium: Ramat Gan Stadium; Attendance: 50,000; Referee: (Netherlands) Leo Horn

5 December 1959 Asian Cup Q	Iran	3–0	Israel	Kochi
	Hajari 49'; Barmaki 59'; Dehdari 65'			Stadium: Maharaja College Stadium; Attendance: 30,000; Referee: (India) Chakravarthy
Note: The match lasted 80 minutes.

8 December 1959 Asian Cup Q	India	1–3	Israel	Kochi
	Devadas 60'		R. Levi 35', 43', 53'	Stadium: Maharaja College Stadium; Attendance: 30,000; Referee: (Iran) Firoz Faz
Note: The match lasted 80 minutes.

10 December 1959 Asian Cup Q	Israel	2–0	Pakistan	Kochi
	R. Levi 55'; Stelmach 65'			Stadium: Maharaja College Stadium; Attendance: 15,000; Referee: (India) Chakravarthy
Note: The match lasted 80 minutes.

12 December 1959 Asian Cup Q	Israel	1–1	Iran	Kochi
	Menchel 9'		Hajari 49'	Stadium: Maharaja College Stadium; Attendance: 15,000; Referee: (India) Chakravarthy
Note: The match lasted 80 minutes.

16 December 1959 Asian Cup Q	India	1–2	Israel	Kochi
	Rehmatullah 19'		Stelmach 11'; R. Levi 75'	Stadium: Maharaja College Stadium; Attendance: 35,000; Referee: (Malaysia) Natarajan
Note: The match lasted 80 minutes.

17 December 1959 Asian Cup Q	Pakistan	2–2	Israel	Kochi
	Omar 49'; Ghafoor 57'		Menchel 60'; Ratzabi 68'	Stadium: Maharaja College Stadium; Attendance: 15,000; Referee: (India) Natarajan
Note: The match lasted 80 minutes.

6 March 1960 Ol. Q	Israel	2–1	Greece	Ramat Gan
	Menchel 50'; Glazer 87'		Linoxilakis 6'	Stadium: Ramat Gan Stadium; Attendance: 45,000; Referee: (Iran) Nassiri

3 April 1960 Ol. Q	Greece	2–1	Israel	Athens
	Serafidhis 66', 80'		Glazer 60'	Stadium: Leoforos Alexandras Stadium; Attendance: 18,000; Referee: (Italy) Liverani

10 April 1960 Ol. Q	Yugoslavia	1–2	Israel	Athens
	Mujić 32'		Levi 2', 67'	Stadium: Leoforos Alexandras Stadium; Attendance: 18,000; Referee: (Italy) Liverani

22 May 1960 Friendly, unofficial	Israel	4–0	England U-23	Ramat Gan
	Levi 34', 71' (pen.); Glazer 75'; Menchel			Stadium: Ramat Gan Stadium; Attendance: 45,000; Referee: (England) John Kelly
