= 1960–61 in Israeli football =

Football in Israel
- Season: 1960–61

Men's football
- Liga Leumit: Hapoel Petah Tikva
- Liga Alef: Hapoel Tiberias
- Liga Bet: Hapoel HaMechonit; Beitar Netanya; Maccabi Ramla; SK Nes Tziona
- State Cup: Hapoel Tel Aviv

The 1960–61 season was the 13th season of competitive football in Israel and the 35th season under the Israeli Football Association, established in 1928, during the British Mandate.

== Review and Events ==
- The national team competed in the 1960 AFC Asian Cup, hosted in South Korea. The team came out second after winning two matches and losing one, to eventual winners, South Korea.
- In the 1962 World Cup qualification, Israel was drawn in the European Zone, into Group 7. The group was played in a knockout stage on a home-and-away basis. Israel defeated Cyprus in the first round and then Ethiopia in the second round, to advance to the zonal final, against Italy, which was played in October 1961.

== Domestic leagues ==
=== Promotion and relegation ===
The following promotions and relegations took place at the end of the season:

Promoted to Liga Leumit

- Hapoel Tiberias

Promoted to Liga Alef

- Beitar Netanya
- Maccabi Ramla

Promoted to Liga Bet

- Hapoel Kfar Blum
- Hapoel Beit HaShita
- HaCarmel Club Haifa
- Hapoel Bat Yam
- Hapoel Ya'akov Kfar Saba
- Hapoel Ein Karem
- Hapoel Sderot
- Hapoel Bnei Zion

Relegated from Liga Leumit

- Beitar Tel Aviv

Relegated from Liga Alef

- Hapoel Hadera
- Hapoel Herzliya

Relegated from Liga Bet

- Hapoel Geva
- Beitar Binyamina
- Hapoel Karkur
- Hapoel Dora Netanya
- Hapoel Kiryat Shalom ^{1}
- Hapoel Zichronot
- Maccabi Gedera
- Hapoel Gedera

1. Hapoel Kiryat Shalom merged with Hapoel HaDarom Tel Aviv and remained, as part of the merged club, in Liga Bet.

== Domestic cups ==
=== Israel State Cup ===
The 1958–59 Israel State Cup started during the previous season, but was carried over the summer break and finished with the final on 19 November 1959, in which Maccabi Tel Aviv defeated Hapoel Petah Tikva 4–3.

On 30 January 1960, the next season's competition began, and once again carried over to the next season.

== National Teams ==
=== National team ===
==== 1960 AFC Asian Cup ====
Pos	Team	Pld	W	D	L	GF	GA	GD	Pts	Qualification
1	South Korea (H)	3	3	0	0	9	1	+8	6	Champions
2	Israel	3	2	0	1	6	4	+2	4	Runners-up
3	Republic of China	3	1	0	2	2	2	0	2	Third place
4	South Vietnam	3	0	0	3	2	12	−10	0	Fourth place

Source: RSSSF
(H) Hosts

==== 1960–61 matches ====
17 October 1960 AFC Asian Cup	South Korea	3–0	Israel	Seoul
15:00	Cho Yoon-Ok 17', 60'; Woo Sang-Kwon 30'			Stadium: Hyochang Stadium; Attendance: 30,000; Referee: (Japan) Yokoyama
Note: The match lasted 80 minutes.

19 October 1960 AFC Asian Cup	Israel	5–1	South Vietnam	Seoul
	R. Levi 13'; Stelmach 18'; S. Levi 25'; Menchel 32'; Aharonskind 70'		Trần Văn Nhung 68' (pen.)	Stadium: Hyochang Stadium; Attendance: 15,000; Referee: (Philippines) Javellana
Note: The match lasted 80 minutes.

23 October 1960 AFC Asian Cup	Israel	1–0	Republic of China	Seoul
	S. Levi 72'			Stadium: Hyochang Stadium; Attendance: 25,000; Referee: (Japan) Yokoyama
Note: The match lasted 80 minutes.

13 November 1960 WC Q	Cyprus	1–1	Israel	Nicosia
	Shialis 29'	Report	Kofman 31'	Stadium: GSP Stadium; Attendance: 11,000; Referee: (Socialist Federal Republic of Yugoslavia) Vlajić

27 November 1960 WC Q	Israel	6–1	Cyprus	Ramat Gan
	Levi 14', 30', 66'; Stelmach 61', 88'; Nahari 34'	Report	Shialis 89' (pen.)	Stadium: Ramat Gan Stadium; Attendance: 45,000; Referee: (Socialist Federal Republic of Yugoslavia) Bajić

14 March 1961 WC Q	Israel	1–0	Ethiopia	Ramat Gan
	Glazer 69'			Stadium: Ramat Gan Stadium; Attendance: 35,000; Referee: (Hungary) Zsolt

19 March 1961 WC Q	Israel	3–2	Ethiopia	Haifa
	Glazer 27', 77'; Stelmach 59'		Mengistu 34'; Tesfaye 64'	Stadium: Kiryat Eliezer Stadium; Referee: (Hungary) Pósa
