= 1958–59 Israel State Cup =

Tournament details
- Country: Israel

Final positions
- Champions: Maccabi Tel Aviv (10th Title)
- Runners-up: Hapoel Petah Tikva

The 1958–59 Israel State Cup (Hebrew: גביע המדינה, Gvia HaMedina) was the 21st season of Israel's nationwide football cup competition and the sixth after the Israeli Declaration of Independence.

The competition began on 6 December 1958, with 136 Liga Gimel teams competing at the first round. Further rounds, until round 5 were played during the remainder of the 1958–59 season. Liga Lemuit teams entered the competition on the sixth round, on 12 September 1959.

The final was held at the Ramat Gan Stadium on 19 November 1959. Maccabi Tel Aviv defeated Hapoel Petah Tikva 4–3, after leading 4–0, and almost losing the advantage during the last ten minutes of the match. The result gave Maccabi Tel Aviv its second consecutive cup and 10th cup overall.

== Results ==
=== First round ===
The teams were divided into regions, corresponding with Liga Gimel and Liga Dalet divisions.

Known results:

Home Team	Score	Away Team
Upper Galilee division
Beitar Safed	0–6	Hapoel Dan
Maccabi Tiberias	0–3	Hapoel Hulyot
North division
Beitar Binyamina	4–2	HaCarmel Haifa
Beitar Haifa	2–1	Hapoel Zikhron Ya'akov
Beitar Tel Amal	6–2	HaAtid Haifa
Samaria division
Hapoel Beit Eliezer	2–4	Hapoel Givat Haim
Hapoel Nahliel	11–0	Hapoel Karkur
Sharon division
Hapoel Ein Ya'akov	4–3 (a.e.t.)	Hapoel Beit Yitzhak
Hapoel Yanuv	7–0	Beitar Beit Lid
Hapoel Tel Mond	4–1	Beitar Ra'anana
Middle-Dan division
Hapoel Or Yehuda	2–2 (a.e.t.)	Hapoel Herzliya
Beitar Or Yehuda	1–3 (a.e.t.)	Hapoel HaKochav Or Yehuda
Tel Aviv division
Beitar Holon	1–3 (a.e.t.)	Hapoel HaTzafon Tel Aviv
Maccabi Bat Yam	3–1	Hapoel Bat Yam
Hapoel Kiryat Shalom	w/o	Maccabi Holon
Center division
Beitar Be'er Ya'akov	0–3	Hapoel Marmorek
Hapoel Ekron	w/o	Beitar Nes Tziona
Jerusalem division
Hapoel Beit Shemesh	1–2	YMCA Jerusalem
Maccabi Jerusalem	4–2	Hapoel HaTzafon Jerusalem
South division
Hapoel Sderot	1–0	Hapoel Ofakim
Beitar Amatzia	w/o	Hapoel Gedera
Hapoel Ashkelon	6–0	Hapoel Tel Re'im
Hapoel Hatzav	w/o	Beitar Be'er Sheva
Hapoel Shmuel Be'er Sheva	2–3	Hapoel Merhavim

==== Replays ====
Home Team	Score	Away Team
Hapoel Herzliya	w/o	Hapoel Or Yehuda

=== Second round ===
As in the first round, the second round matches were regionalized.

Known results:

Home Team	Score	Away Team
Upper Galilee division
Hapoel Hulyot	w/o	Hapoel Kiryat Shmona
North division
Maccabi Zikhron Ya'akov	1–3	Beitar Binyamina
Beitar Haifa	4–1	Maccabi Elro'i
Samaria & Sharon divisions
Beitar Ein Ya'akov	w/o	Hapoel Nahliel
Hapoel Shvut Am	0–2	Maccabi Beit Lid
Hapoel Kadima	0–16	Hapoel Givat Haim
Hapoel Tel Mond	2–0	Hapoel Givat Olga
Middle, Dan and Center divisions
Hapoel HaKochav Or Yehuda	1–2	Beitar Nes Tziona
Hapoel Ramatayim	0–5	Hapoel Zarnuga
Tel Aviv division
Maccabi Bat Yam	5–0	Beitar HaTzafon Tel Aviv
Hapoel Kiryat Shalom	5–0	Hapoel Azor
Jerusalem division
Hapoel Zikhronot	0–2	YMCA Jerusalem
Maccabi Jerusalem	13–0	Hapoel Maoz Zion

=== Third Round ===
Liga Bet teams joined the competition. The draw, in which the 27 matches of the round was set, was unseeded and wasn't regionalized. Only 17 matches were played, with the remaining ten matches given as a walkover victory either due to away teams failing to appear to the match or due to home teams not sending referee invitations to the IFA.

Home Team	Score	Away Team
Beitar Beit Shemesh	w/o	Hapoel Burgata
Beitar Mahane Yehuda	w/o	Beitar Binyamina
Beitar Nes Tziona	2–0	Beitar Netanya
Beitar Tel Amal	w/o	Hapoel Nahliel
Hapoel Acre	4–0	Beitar Haifa
Hapoel Ashkelon	3–2	Hapoel Lod
Hapoel Even Yehuda	w/o	Hapoel Be'er Ya'akov
Hapoel Gedera	1–4	Hapoel Netanya
Hapoel Givat Haim	w/o	Maccabi Beit Lid
Hapoel HaDarom Tel Aviv	w/o	Hapoel Nahariya
Hapoel Kiryat Ono	6–0	Hapoel HaDarom Jerusalem
Hapoel Kiryat Shalom	2–1	Hapoel Herzliya
Hapoel Kiryat Shmona	2–1	Hapoel Dan
Hapoel Ofakim	w/o	Hapoel Shoval
Hapoel Pardes Hanna	3–0	Hapoel Ein Ya'akov
Hapoel Ra'anana	0–1	Maccabi Ramat Amidar
Hapoel Ramla	w/o	Hapoel Atlit
Hapoel Rishon Lezion	3–0	Hapoel Holon
Hapoel Safed	6–5	Hapoel Beit Dagan
Hapoel Tel Hanan	12–0	Maccabi Kiryat Shmona
Hapoel Tel Mond	w/o	YMCA Jerusalem
Hapoel Tiberias	w/o	Maccabi Ramla
Hapoel Tirat HaCarmel	3–0	Hapoel Ramatayim
Hapoel Yehud	3–1	Hapoel Yanuv
Maccabi Bat Yam	2–0	Hapoel Kfar Ata
Maccabi Jerusalem	w/o	Hapoel Beit Lid
SK Nes Tziona	5–0	Hapoel Kiryat Gat

=== Fourth round ===
Home Team	Score	Away Team
Hapoel Kiryat Haim	3–1	Hapoel Safed
Hapoel Hadera	7–1	Hapoel Nahariya
Shimshon Tel Aviv	1–5	Maccabi Ramat Gan
Hapoel Netanya	2–1	Maccabi Rehovot
Hapoel Givat Haim	2–4	Hapoel Mahane Yehuda
Maccabi Hadera	8–1	Hapoel Kiryat Shmona
Hapoel Tiberias	w/o	Hapoel Tel Hanan
Hapoel Rehovot	3–2	Hapoel Yehud
Hapoel Afula	10–0	Hapoel Ein Karem
Sektzia Nes Tziona	6–3 (a.e.t.)	Maccabi Shmuel Tel Aviv
Hapoel Acre	0–3	Hapoel HaMechonit
YMCA Jerusalem	1–5 (a.e.t.)	Hapoel Be'er Ya'akov
Hapoel Shoval	0–0 (a.e.t.)	Hapoel Ashkelon
Maccabi Bat Yam	2–0	Hapoel Ramla
Hapoel Rishon LeZion	6–3	Hapoel Kiryat Shalom
Maccabi Ramat Amidar	3–3 (a.e.t.)	Beitar Jaffa
Hapoel Tirat HaCarmel	w/o	Hapoel Pardes Hanna
Hapoel Kiryat Ono	0–1	Beitar Binyamina
Beitar Nes Tziona	1–4	Hapoel Nahliel

Bye: Maccabi Jerusalem, Hapoel Burgata

==== Replays ====
Home Team	Score	Away Team
Hapoel Ashkelon	3–1	Hapoel Shoval
Beitar Jaffa	0–1	Maccabi Ramat Amidar

=== Fifth round ===
An intermediate round, intended to leave 16 teams advancing to the sixth round. 10 of the remaining 21 teams played each other, with the rest receiving a bye to the next round.

Home Team	Score	Away Team
Hapoel Tiberias	4–0	Bnei Yehuda Tel Aviv
Hapoel Pardes Hanna	4–1	Hapoel Burgata
Hapoel Afula	0–2	Hakoah Tel Aviv
Hapoel Nahliel	6–0	Maccabi Sha'arayim
Beitar Jerusalem	2–0	Hapoel Netanya

=== Sixth round ===
5 September 1959	Hapoel Nahliel	1–7	Hapoel Petah Tikva
	Hamami 15' (pen.)		Z. Ratzabi 2'; Nahari 18', 83', 85'; Stelmach 20', 39', 73'

12 September 1959	Hapoel Haifa	2–1	Hapoel Tiberias	Kiryat Eliezer Stadium
	S. Levi 44'; Čajkovski 75'		M. Faraj 13'	Attendance: 5,000; Referee: Weinreb

12 September 1959	Hapoel Pardes Hanna	0–1	Hakoah Tel Aviv

12 September 1959	Hapoel Mahane Yehuda	2–1	Beitar Jerusalem	Mahane Yehuda Field, Petah Tikva
	Rabayov 11', 15'		Aminoff 52'	Attendance: 800; Referee: Marin

12 September 1959	Hapoel HaMechonit	1–2	Maccabi Ramat Amidar	Haifa

12 September 1959	Sektzia Nes Tziona	2–1	Maccabi Bat Yam	Maccabi Nes Tziona ground
	Ben-Gera 25'; Ashkenazi 85'		Meshulam 4'	Attendance: 1250; Referee: A. Levi

12 September 1959	Hapoel Tel Aviv	4–0	Hapoel Rehovot	Basa Stadium, Tel Aviv
	Fuchs 4'; Rosenbaum 22'; Menahem 65'; Sapozhnikov 67'			Attendance: 3,000; Referee: Prohaski

12 September 1959	Maccabi Petah Tikva	1–1	Hapoel Ramat Gan
	Begbleiter 11'		Pulver 75'	Attendance: 3,000; Referee: Frizner

12 September 1959	Beitar Binyamina	3–2	Hapoel Be'er Ya'akov
				Attendance: 150

12 September 1959	Maccabi Ramat Gan	1–0	Maccabi Netanya	Galei Gil Stadium
	Babayov 31'			Attendance: 1500; Referee: Gaon

12 September 1959	Maccabi Hadera	8–4 (a.e.t.)	Hapoel Rishon LeZion	Maccabi Hadera ground
	Heller 15', 106'; Mendel 41', 100'; Portnoi 81', 107'; Bitton 102', 112'		Madmoni 3'; Reingold 18'; Feldklein 64', 115' (pen.)	Attendance: 500; Referee: Strogno

12 September 1959	Hapoel Hadera	0–4	Maccabi Jaffa	Hapoel Hadera ground
			Ghouhasian 49'; Arie 60', 66'; Ashkenazi 63'	Attendance: 1500; Referee: Klein

12 September 1959	Maccabi Jerusalem	0–6	Maccabi Haifa
			Mimran 40' (o.g.); Amar 60'; Menchel 69'; Hanukkah 78' (o.g.); Ben-Zvi 87'; Harari 89'	Attendance: 2,000; Referee: Shapira

12 September 1959	Hapoel Kiryat Haim	1–3	Maccabi Tel Aviv
	Galsberg 15'		R. Levi 17'; Nahmias 59'; Vilenski 63'

12 September 1959	Hapoel Jerusalem	6–2	Hapoel Ashkelon	Mahane Yehuda Field, Petah Tikva
	M. Cohen 14'; Yatzkan 19'; Zakai 29'; Yehudayoff 77', 87'; Shushan 83 83'		Margolis 30'; Shain 40'	Attendance: 2,000; Referee: Asa

12 September 1959	Hapoel Kfar Saba	5–1	Beitar Tel Aviv
	Rosmarin 40'; H. Glazer 59'; S. Cohen 66'; A. Cohen 78'; Vidra 89'		A. Levi 51'	Attendance: 3,000; Referee: Ashkenazi

==== Replay ====
24 September 1959	Hapoel Ramat Gan	1–2	Maccabi Petah Tikva
	Kochavi 7'		Becker 64'; Litner 79'	Attendance: 1,000; Referee: Frizner

=== Seventh round ===
26 September 1959	Sektzia Nes Tziona	0–6	Maccabi Tel Aviv
			7' (o.g.); Y. Glazer 15'; Nahmias 17', 37'; R. Levi 36'; Goldstein 66'

26 September 1959	Hapoel Kfar Saba	0–2	Maccabi Petah Tikva
			Litner 31'; Begbleiter 36' (pen.)	Attendance: 2,000; Referee: Wilenski

26 September 1959	Hapoel Petah Tikva	10–2	Beitar Binyamina
	Z. Ratzabi ?', ?', ?', ?'; Stelmach ?', ?'; Kaufmann ?', ?'; Atuar ?'; Gayer ?'		Ben-Ya'akov ?', ?'	Attendance: 1,500

26 September 1959	Hapoel Tel Aviv	5–0	Maccabi Ramat Gan	Basa Stadium, Tel Aviv
	Sakal 3'; Menahem 35' (pen.); Rosebnaum 77', 79', 81'			Attendance: 1,000; Referee: Schleifer

26 September 1959	Hapoel Haifa	5–1	Hapoel Jerusalem
	Hanuni 5' (o.g.); Čajkovski 26' (pen.); Parselani 39'; S. Levi ?', ?'		Hamawi 68'	Attendance: 5,000; Referee: Dudai

26 September 1959	Maccabi Haifa	5–2	Hakoah Tel Aviv
	Menchel 24', 60'; Hardy 27'; Ben-Zvi 53'; Almani 63'		Moshe 44' (pen.); Siman Tov 49'	Attendance: 4,000; Referee: Handwerk

26 September 1959	Hapoel Mahane Yehuda	0–1	Maccabi Jaffa
			Romi 15'	Attendance: 3,000; Referee: Ron

26 September 1959	Maccabi Ramat Amidar	1–2	Maccabi Hadera
	Damari		Bitton; Rottmann

=== Quarter-finals ===
24 October 1959

Hapoel Peath Tikva	2–0	Hapoel Haifa
Stelmach 69'; Z. Ratzabi 88'		Ginzburg 12'

Attendance: 3,000
Referee: Fried

24 October 1959

Maccabi Petah Tikva	5–0	Hapoel Tel Aviv
Levkovich 2'; Bar-Zion 52'; Ben-Dror 72' (pen.)

Attendance: 1,000
Referee: Schleifer

24 October 1959

Maccabi Haifa	3–0	Maccabi Jaffa
Held 5', 52', 57'

Attendance: 4,000
Referee: Dudai

24 October 1959

Maccabi Tel Aviv	3–0	Maccabi Hadera
Wilenski 6'; R. Levi 8'; Nahmias 68'

Attendance: 2,000
Referee: Admoni

=== Semi-finals ===
31 October 1959

Maccabi Tel Aviv	2–1	Maccabi Petah Tikva
Y. Glazer 44'; R. Levi 60'		Aharonov 74'

Kiryat Eliezer Stadium
Attendance: 6,000
Referee: Mizrahi

31 October 1959

Hapoel Petah Tikva	4–2	Maccabi Haifa
Z. Ratzabi 14', 36'; Kaufmann 37'; Stelmach 42'		Held 61'; Haldi 69' (o.g.)

Basa Stadium, Tel Aviv
Attendance: 10,000
Referee: Ben-Rubi

=== Final ===
19 November 1959

Maccabi Tel Aviv	4–3	Hapoel Petah Tikva
R. Levi 20' (pen.); Y. Glazer 32', 71'; Aharonskind 79'		Z. Ratzabi 80'; Kofman 82'; Markus 84'

Ramat Gan Stadium
Attendance: 10,000
Referee: Schleifer
