= 1962–63 in Israeli football =

Football in Israel
- Season: 1962–63

Men's football
- Liga Leumit: Hapoel Petah Tikva
- Liga Alef: Hapoel Ramat Gan
- State Cup: Hapoel Haifa
- Israel Super Cup: Hapoel Petah Tikva; Maccabi Haifa (Shared)

The 1962–63 season was the 15th season of competitive football in Israel and the 37th season under the Israeli Football Association, established in 1928, during the British Mandate.

== Review and Events ==
- At the end of the season, the Liga Alef (second tier) was reconstructed expanding Liga Leumit, the top division, to 15 clubs and splitting into two regional divisions, each with 14 clubs. This meant that no clubs relegated from Liga Leumit, while 3 clubs promoted from Liga Alef, and 17 clubs promoted from Liga Bet To accommodate the vacant places in the two divisions of Liga Alef.

== Domestic leagues ==
=== Promotion and relegation ===
The following promotions and relegations took place at the end of the season:

Promoted to Liga Leumit

- Hapoel Ramat Gan
- Hapoel Lod
- Maccabi Sha'arayim

Relegated from Liga Leumit

None

Promoted to Liga Alef

- Beitar Ramla
- Hapoel Acre
- Hapoel Givat Haim
- Hapoel Givatayim
- Hapoel Herzliya
- Hapoel Kfar Blum
- Hapoel Kiryat Ono
- Hapoel Marmorek
- Hapoel Nahariya
- Hapoel Nahliel
- Hapoel Rishon LeZion
- Maccabi Hadera
- Maccabi Ramat Amidar
- Maccabi Shmuel Tel Aviv
- Maccabi Zikhron Ya'akov
- SK Nes Tziona
- YMCA Jerusalem

Relegated from Liga Alef

- Hapoel Safed
- Maccabi Ramla

Promoted to Liga Bet

- Beitar Acre
- Beitar Ezra
- Beitar Kiryat Ekron
- Beitar Nahariya
- Beitar Safed
- F.C. Even Yehuda
- Hapoel Afikim
- Hapoel Avraham Be'er Sheva
- Hapoel Bnei Zion
- Hapoel Dorot
- Hapoel HaTzafon Jerusalem
- Hapoel Kfar Shalem
- Hapoel Migdal HaEmek
- Hapoel Pardesiya
- Shefa-'Amr Club
- Hapoel Shikun HaMizrah
- Hapoel Tirat HaCarmel
- Maccabi Ashkelon
- Maccabi Herzliya

* Hapoel Tel Hanan (3rd in Haifa division of Liga Gimel) merged with Hapoel HaMechonit from Liga Bet and was effectively promoted as well.

Relegated from Liga Bet

- ASA Jerusalem
- Beitar Beit Lid
- Hapoel Kiryat Gat
- Hapoel Yagur

== Domestic cups ==
=== Israel State Cup ===
The 1962–63 Israel State Cup, which stated during the previous season, was completed during the season and finished on 27 May 1963, with the final, in which Hapoel Haifa had beaten its city rivals 1–0.

=== Israel Super Cup ===
On 22 January 1963, league champions Hapoel Petah Tikva and cup holders Maccabi Haifa met in a contest for the second Super Cup. The cup, which wasn't sanctioned by the IFA, was donated by Ilanshil-Polio, an Israeli organization dedicated to aid Poliomyelitis victims, with proceedings going towards the organization. The match ended in 2–2 draw and the cup was shared.

== National Teams ==
=== National team ===
==== 1962–63 matches ====
3 October 1962 Friendly	Israel	3–0	Ethiopia	Ramat Gan
	Levkovich 26' (pen.); Menchel 58'; Stelmach 72'			Stadium: Ramat Gan Stadium; Attendance: 30,000; Referee: Fried (Israel)

17 October 1962 Friendly	Israel	1–1	Austria	Ramat Gan
	Menchel 86'		Flögel 74'	Stadium: Ramat Gan Stadium; Attendance: 38,000; Referee: Başar (Turkey)

12 November 1962 Friendly	Israel	0–4	Sweden	Ramat Gan
			Ohlsson 10'; Skiöld 12', 82', 86'	Stadium: Ramat Gan Stadium; Attendance: 41,083; Referee: Budaj (Poland)

25 November 1962 Friendly	Israel	0–2	Turkey	Ramat Gan
			Birol 11', 44'	Stadium: Ramat Gan Stadium; Attendance: 35,000; Referee: Stathatos (Greece)

19 May 1963 Friendly	Israel	0–5	Brazil	Ramat Gan
			Zequinha 12'; Quarentinha 17', 42'; Amarildo 83', 87'	Stadium: Ramat Gan Stadium; Attendance: 42,000; Referee: Horn (Netherlands)
