= List of Hapoel Rishon LeZion F.C. seasons =

This is a list of seasons played by Hapoel Rishon LeZion Football Club in Israeli and European football, from 1936–37 (when the club first competed in the Cup) to the most recent completed season. It details the club's achievements in major competitions, and the top scorers for each season. Top scorers in bold were also the top scorers in the Israeli league that season. Records of minor competitions such as the Lilian Cup are not included due to them being considered of less importance than the State Cup and the Toto Cup.

== History ==
The club was established in 1929 and won the promotion play-offs to the top division at the end of the 1940 season, ahead of the 1941–42 season. The club stayed at the top division until the end of the 1951–52 season, after which the club mainly played in the second division, returning to the top division for three seasons in the late 1970s and 9 more seasons, starting from 1994–95 season. The club reached the cup final in 1996, losing to Maccabi Tel Aviv. As Maccabi Tel Aviv won the double, The club qualified to UEFA Cup Winners' Cup, but was eliminated in the qualifying round by Constructorul Chisinau of Moldova on away goals rule (0:1, 3:2).

== Seasons ==
Season	League									State Cup	League Cup	International (Asia/Europe)	Top goalscorer (Note: Goals in all competitions (Liga Leumit or Liga Al, State Cup, Toto Cup and European) are counted.)	
Season	Division	P	W	D	L	F	A	Pts	Pos	State Cup	League Cup	International (Asia/Europe)	Name	Goals
1936–37	–	–	–	–	–	–	–	–	–	QF	–	–		
1937–38	Bet South									–	–	–		
1938–39	–	–	–	–	–	–	–	–	–	QF	–	–		
1939–40	Bet South	14	10	2	2	38	17	22	2nd (Note: Hapoel Rishon LeZion participated in promotion play-offs as the 1st ranked team, a team representing the British Royal Scots Greys was ineligible for promotion. Hapoel Rishon LeZion won three matches and drew one to promote to the top division.)	R1	–	–		
1940–41	–	–	–	–	–	–	–	–	–	SF	–	–		
1941–42	Pal. League; Southern (Note: The 1941–42 league season was held in three regional divisions followed by a play-off. The league was completed during the 1942–43 season.)	26	5	2	19	26	71	10 (Note: Two of Hapoel Rishon LeZion matches, against Beitar Tel Aviv and Degel Zion were given as a 0–0 without points due to infringements from both involved clubs (in each match).)	12th	–	–	–		
1942–43	–	–	–	–	–	–	–	–	–	–	–	–		
1943–44	Pal. League	24	6	4	14	39	87	16	11th	R1 (Note: The 1944 cup competitions began on 5 February 1944 and was completed during the following season, on 13 January 1945.)	–	–		
1944–45	Pal. League; Southern	10	4	1	5	16	19	9	6th	R1	–	–		
1945–46	–	–	–	–	–	–	–	–	–	Final	–	–		
1946–47	Pal. League	26	5	6	15	27	67	16	12th	R2	–	–		
1947–48	Pal. League (Note: The 1947–48 league was abandoned due to the 1948 Arab–Israeli War.)	4	2	0	2	10	14	4	9th	–	–	–		
1948–49	–	–	–	–	–	–	–	–	–	R1 (Note: The 1949 cup competition was delayed by appeals after the completion of the quarter-finals. After settling the appeals three further matches were played in February 1951, and the competition was abandoned.)	–	–		
1949–50	Isr. League	24	6	2	16	27	65	14	11th	R1	–	–		
1950–51	–	–	–	–	–	–	–	–	–	R1	–	–		
1951–52	Alef	22	5	6	11	22	52	16	11th	R4	–	–		
1952–53	–	–	–	–	–	–	–	–	–	R4	–	–		
1953–54	Bet South	26	14	4	8	65	36	32	5th	R4	–	–		
1954–55	Bet South	22	5	4	13	29	44	14	10th	R2	–	–		
1955–56	Bet South	22						27	4th	–	–	–		
1956–57	Bet South	24	12	8	4	58	30	28	3rd	Int. Round	–	–		
1957–58	Bet South	20				39	33	22	5th	R3	–	–		
1958–59	Bet South	22				33	33	17	8th	R5	–	–		
1959–60	Bet South B	30				85	29	44	3rd		–	–		
1960–61	Bet South B	30				35	25	41	5th		–	–		
1961–62	Bet South B	30				72	34	45	3rd		–	–		
1962–63	Bet South B	30				78	36	39	4th		–	–		
1963–64	Alef South	26	3	6	17	26	57	12	14th	R4	–	–		
1964–65	Bet South B	30				66	24	48	1st	R4	–	–		
1965–66	Alef South	30	9	14	7	44	32	32	6th	R6	–	–		
1966–67	Alef South	60	20	15	25	84	95	55	9th	R5	–	–		
1967–68	Alef South	60	20	15	25	84	95	55	9th	R4	–	–		
1968–69	Alef South	30	10	12	8	41	43	32	5th	R6	–	–		
1969–70	Alef South	30	12	8	10	55	48	32	4th	R6	–	–		
1970–71	Alef South	30	12	7	11	64	67	31	8th	R6	–	–		
1971–72	Alef South	30	8	11	11	45	47	27	8th	R6	–	–		
1972–73	Alef South	30	14	2	14	52	53	30	7th	R6	Group	–		
1973–74	Alef South	30	10	11	9	39	43	31	5th	R4	–	–		
1974–75	Alef South	30	15	11	4	64	33	41	3rd	R4	–	–		
1975–76	Alef South	32	13	12	7	41	21	38	4th	R3	QF	–		
1976–77	Artzit	22	4	12	6	20	25	20	8th	R4	–	–		
1977–78	Artzit	26	12	9	5	31	19	33	4th	Round of 16	–	–		
1978–79	Leumit	30	4	10	16	19	46	16 (Note: Hapoel Rishon LeZion had two points deducted.)	16th	Round of 16	–	–		
1979–80	Artzit	30	15	8	7	35	18	38	3rd	R7	–	–		
1980–81	Leumit	30	9	14	7	25	18	32	6th	R7	–	–		
1981–82	Leumit	30	8	10	12	28	32	26	14th	QF	–	–		
1982–83	Artzit	30	13	9	8	38	30	48	5th	R7	–	–		
1983–84	Artzit	30	14	8	8	42	26	50	4th	R6	–	–		
1984–85	Artzit	30	6	12	12	27	39	30	15th	R7	SF	–		
1985–86	Alef South	26				28	16	30	2nd		–	–		
1986–87	Alef South	26	10	8	8	38	25	28	5th	R7	–	–		
1987–88	Alef South	30	15	11	4	50	24	41	2nd		–	–		
1988–89	Alef South	30	19	8	3	57	19	46	1st		–	–		
1989–90	Artzit	30	5	9	16	41	57	24	15th	R7	Group	–		
1990–91	Alef South	30	4	14	12	21	38	22	12th		–	–		
1991–92	Alef South	30	17	8	5	59	28	42	3rd		–	–		
1992–93	Alef South	30	20	6	4	54	33	46	1st		–	–		
1993–94	Artzit	30	18	6	6	53	27	60	1st	R8	Group	–		
1994–95	Leumit	30	7	13	10	39	44	34	9th	Round of 16	Group	–		
1995–96	Leumit	30	8	7	15	25	40	31	9th	Final	SF	–		
1996–97	Leumit	30	11	7	12	35	47	40	9th	R8	Group	CWC, QR		
1997–98	Leumit	30	10	6	14	42	52	36	10th	QF	Group	–		
1998–99	Leumit	30	12	6	12	58	61	42	7th	Round of 16	Group	–		
1999–2000	Premier	39	10	13	16	41	65	43	9th	R8	SF	–		
2000–01	Premier	38	11	8	19	41	61	41	9th	QF	R2	–		
2001–02	Premier	33	10	5	18	39	53	35	9th	R8	R2	–		
2002–03	Premier	33	4	6	23	35	67	18	14th	R8	Group	–		
2003–04	Leumit	33	9	9	15	31	42	36	10th	Round of 16	QF	–		
2004–05	Leumit	33	11	12	10	36	36	45	6th	R9	Group	–		
2005–06	Leumit	33	6	13	14	24	43	31	11th	R9	Group	–		
2006–07	Artzit	33	18	7	8	53	34	61	2nd	R6	Group	–	Roni Ohana	14
2007–08	Leumit	33	5	7	21	28	53	37	11th	Round of 16	Group	–	Mor Golan; Shlomi Edri	12
2008–09	Artzit	33	16	8	9	58	33	56	4th	R8	SF	–	Ofer Shitrit	13
2009–10	Leumit	33	13	7	13	39	31	26 (Note: Hapoel Rishon LeZion scored 40 points in the regular season, which were halved at the beginning of the play-offs. The club scored 6 more points during the play-offs for a total of 46 points.)	8th	R7	Final	–	Magalan Ugochukwu	9
2010–11	Leumit	35	18	8	9	57	31	36 (Note: Hapoel Rishon LeZion scored 52 points in the regular season, which were halved at the beginning of the play-offs. The club scored 10 more points during the play-offs for a total of 62 points.)	2nd	Round of 16	QF	–	David Gomez	16
2011–12	Premier	37	6	9	22	39	70	27	15th	R8	Group	–	Asi Baldout	9
2012–13	Leumit	37	11	15	11	44	43	48	6th	SF	Winners	–	Lior Asulin	12
2013–14	Leumit	37	14	8	15	53	55	50	11th	QF	–	–	Shlomi Azulay	10
2014–15	Leumit	37	13	9	15	51	50	48	10	R8	Group	–	Omri Shekel	10
2015–16	Leumit	37	13	9	15	51	53	48	12th	Round of 16	Group	–	Ya'akov Berihon; Eden Shrem	14

== Key ==
- P = Played
- W = Games won
- D = Games drawn
- L = Games lost
- F = Goals for
- A = Goals against
- Pts = Points
- Pos = Final position
- Leumit = Liga Leumit (National League)
- Artzit = Liga Artzit (Nationwide League)
- Premier = Liga Al (Premier League)
- Pal. League = Palestine League
- F = Final
- Group = Group stage
- QF = Quarter-finals
- QR1 = First Qualifying Round
- QR2 = Second Qualifying Round
- QR3 = Third Qualifying Round
- QR4 = Fourth Qualifying Round
- RInt = Intermediate Round
- R1 = Round 1
- R2 = Round 2
- R3 = Round 3
- R4 = Round 4
- R5 = Round 5
- R6 = Round 6
- SF = Semi-finals

Champions	Runners-up	Promoted	Relegated
