= List of Hakoah Tel Aviv F.C. seasons =

This is a list of seasons played by Hakoah Tel Aviv, from 1934 (when the club was established) to 1962, when the club played its last season under the name Hakoah Tel Aviv, before merging with Maccabi Ramat Gan to form Hakoah Maccabi Ramat Gan. It details the club's achievements in major competitions, and the top scorers for each season, if available. Top scorers in bold were also the top scorers in the Israeli league that season. Records of minor competitions such as the Lilian Cup are not included due to them being considered of less importance than the State Cup and the Toto Cup.

== History ==
A club called Hakoah Tel Aviv existed as early as 1923, taking part in a regional league played in the Tel Aviv region, finishing 7th. In 1934, a new Hakoah Tel Aviv was established by former members of Hakoah Berlin. The club joined the EIFA and the Palestine League. The club played at the top division until 1945. In December 1946 the club merged with Hakoah 09 Tel Aviv, a club established by former members of Hakoah Vienna in 1943, and relegated to play in the second division. The club played in the second division until winning the division in 1962, after which the club merged with Maccabi Ramat Gan to form Haokoah Maccabi Ramat Gan.

== Seasons ==
Season	League									State Cup	League Cup	Top goalscorer (Note: Goals in all competitions (Liga Leumit or Liga Al, State Cup, Toto Cup and European) are counted.)	
Season	Division	P	W	D	L	F	A	Pts	Pos	State Cup	League Cup	Name	Goals
1934–35	Pal. League (Note: The 1934–35 league season was stopped to allow Maccabi club to prepare for the 1935 Maccabiah Games and wasn't renewed due to disagreement between Maccabi and Hapoel)	7	4	1	2	14	11	9	3rd	final	–		
1935–36	Pal. League	10	6	3	1	18	8	15	2nd	– (Note: After three matches played in the first round the competition was abandoned due to the Arab Revolt.)	–		
1936–37	Pal. League	8	2	3	3	13	18	7	3rd	QF	–		
1937–38	Pal. League	11	3	2	4	26	21	8	6th	SF	–		
1938–39	Pal. League (Note: The 1938–39 league season was abandoned after playing one round of matches due to the Arab Revolt.)	11	3	2	6	19	28	8	5th	SF	–		
1939–40	Pal. League	14	4	4	6	12	25	12	6th	R2	–		
1940–41	–	–	–	–	–	–	–	–	–	R1	–		
1941–42	Pal. League; Southern (Note: The 1941–42 league season was held in three regional divisions followed by a play-off. The league season was lasted until fall 1943.)	26	4	1	21	27	95	9	13th	–	–		
1942–43	Pal. League; Southern	26	4	1	21	27	95	9	13th	–	–		
1943–44	Pal. League	22	5	5	12	25	45	15	12th	R1 (Note: The 1944 cup competitions began on 5 February 1944 and was completed during the following season, on 13 January 1945.)	–		
1944–45	Pal. League; Southern	10	0	0	10	5	40	0	7th	R1	–		
1945–46	–	–	–	–	–	–	–	–	–	R1	–		
1946–47	Bet; South	16	12	2	2	51	18	26	2nd	R2	–		
1947–48	Bet; South (Note: The 1947–48 league was abandoned due to the 1948 Arab–Israeli War.)	4	3	0	1	14	6	6	3rd	–	–		
1948–49	–	–	–	–	–	–	–	–	–	– (Note: The 1949 cup competition was delayed by appeals after the completion of the quarter-finals. After settling the appeals three further matches were played in February 1951, after which the competition was abandoned.)	–		
1949–50	Meuhedet; Jer./South	16	8	1	7	29	26	17	6th	–	–		
1950–51	–	–	–	–	–	–	–	–	–	–	–		
1951–52	Bet; South	26	16	5	5	76	29	37	3rd	R3	–		
1952–53	–	–	–	–	–	–	–	–	–	R2	–		
1953–54	Bet; South	26	17	0	9	82	39	34	3rd	R2	–		
1954–55	Bet; South	22	16	3	3	55	16	35	2nd	R3	–		
1955–56	Alef	22	17	2	3	47	19	36	1st	–	–		
1956–57	Alef	22	8	7	7	41	39	23	5th	Round of 16	–		
1957–58	Alef	20	6	6	8	32	43	18	9th	R6	–		
1958–59	Alef	22	11	4	7	24	23	26	3rd	Round of 16	R1		
1959–60	Alef	26	14	4	8	40	25	32	3rd	R7	–		
1960–61	Alef	26	15	4	7	46	26	34	2nd	R7	–		
1961–62	Alef	26	19	5	2	52	15	43	1st	R5	–		

== Key ==
- P = Played
- W = Games won
- D = Games drawn
- L = Games lost
- F = Goals for
- A = Goals against
- Pts = Points
- Pos = Final position
- Pal. League = Palestine League
- Alef = Liga Alef
  (1st tier 1947 to 1955; 2nd tier 1955 to 1977; 3rd tier 1977 to 2000 and since 2009)
- Bet = Liga Bet
  (2nd tier 1947 to 1955; 3rd tier 1955 to 1977; 4th tier 1977 to 2000 and since 2009)
- R1 = Round 1
- R2 = Round 2
- R3 = Round 3
- R4 = Round 4
- R5 = Round 5
- R6 = Round 6
- R7 = Round 7
- R8 = Round 8
- R9 = Round 9
- QF = Quarter-finals
- SF = Semi-finals
- Group = Group stage

Champions	Runners-up	Promoted	Relegated
