= 1957–58 Israel State Cup =

Tournament details
- Country: Israel

Final positions
- Champions: Maccabi Tel Aviv (9th Title)
- Runners-up: Hapoel Haifa

The 1957–58 Israel State Cup (Hebrew: גביע המדינה, Gvia HaMedina) was the 20th season of Israel's nationwide football cup competition and the fifth after the Israeli Declaration of Independence.

Early round matches, with Liga Gimel and Liga Bet teams began on 12 October 1957. Liga Leumit clubs joined the competition in late June 1958. a quarter-final match between Maccabi Tel Aviv and Hapoel Petah Tikva ended prematurely, and the IFA ruled the match in favor of Maccabi Tel Aviv. Hapoel Petah Tikva appealed the decision, and the process caused the semi-finals and the final to be delayed until the beginning of the 1958–59 season.

The final was held at the Ramat Gan Stadium on 30 September 1958. Maccabi Tel Aviv defeated Hapoel Haifa 2–0, won its 9th cup and completed its second double since the Israeli Declaration of Independence and third overall.

Following the conclusion of the competition, the IFA played an additional cup competition, dedicated to the 10th anniversary of Israel, which was played during October and November 1958.

== Results ==
=== Third round ===
Matches were played on 29 March 1958, with the 28 winners qualifying to the 4th round.

Home team	Score	Away team
Hapoel Be'er Sheva	3–1	Hapoel Holon
Hapoel Tiberias	w/o	Hapoel Even Yehuda
Hapoel Ramat David	4–1	Hapoel Kfar Ata
Maccabi Bat Yam	w/o	Hapoel Nahariya
Hapoel Beit Eliezer	2–7	Hapoel Tirat HaCarmel
Hapoel Herzliya	w/o	Hapoel Atlit
Hapoel Kiryat Shalom	1–0 (a.e.t.)	Hapoel Beit Lid
Hapoel HaDarom Tel Aviv	w/o (Note: The match was abandoned at the 70th minute, with the score 1–1, due to a brawl between the players.)	Hapoel Safed
Beitar Lod	2–1	Maccabi Shmuel Tel Aviv
Beitar Ramla	4–0	Hapoel Rishon LeZion
Hapoel Kiryat Ono	4–1	Maccabi Jerusalem
Hapoel HaTzafon Jerusalem	w/o (Note: The match was abandoned at the 86th minute with Maccabi Ramat Gan leading 3–1, as a Hapoel HaTzafon player attacked the referee.)	Maccabi Ramat Gan
Hapoel Or Yehuda	w/o	Hapoel Ramla
Beitar Or Yehuda	3–4	Beitar Jaffa
Hapoel Yehud	w/o	Beitar Mahane Yehuda
Hapoel Merhavim	2–0	Hapoel Ra'anana
Hapoel Hulyot	4–2	Beitar Netanya
Hapoel Acre	3–0	Beitar Ra'anana
Beitar Shkhunat Hatikva	w/o	Hapoel Tel Hanan
Hapoel Sde Uziyah	1–2	Sektzia Nes Tziona
Maccabi Ramla	w/o	Hapoel Be'er Tuvia
Hapoel HaMechonit	5–0	Hapoel Givat Olga
Beitar Beit Lid	w/o	Moadon HaCarmel
Hapoel Ganei Tikva	2–1	Hapoel Hatzor
Hapoel Be'er Ya'akov	w/o	Hapoel Tel Re'im
Beitar Nachlaot	w/o	Hapoel Kiryat Gat
Hapoel Ein Karem	3–0	Hapoel HaDarom Jerusalem
Hapoel Netanya	w/o	Hapoel Neot Mordechai

=== Fourth round ===
The remaining 28 clubs played 14 matches to set the 14 clubs that will qualify to the sixth round.

Home team	Score	Away team
Maccabi Ramla	2–1	Beitar Ramla
Beitar Lod	w/o	Hapoel Be'er Sheva
Hapoel Or Yehuda	1–0 (a.e.t.) (Note: The match was abandoned at the 116th minute as Hapoel Yehud player refused to leave the pitch after being sent off.)	Hapoel Yehud
Hapoel Tel Hanan	3–3 (a.e.t.)	Moadon HaCarmel
Hapoel HaMechonit	w/o	Hapoel Ganei Tikva
Hapoel Ramat David	3–5	Hapoel Hulyot
Beitar Jaffa	0–5	Hapoel Herzliya
Hapoel Kiryat Ono	0–0 (a.e.t.)	SK Nes Tiona
Maccabi Bat Yam	5–2	Hapoel Ein Karem
Hapoel Tiberias	w/o	Hapoel Safed
Hapoel Kiryat Shalom	4–0	Hapoel Kiryat Gat
Hapoel Acre	w/o	Maccabi Ramat Gan
Hapoel Merhavim	1–2	Hapoel Be'er Ya'akov
Hapoel Tirat HaCarmel	w/o	Hapoel Neot Mordechai

==== Replays ====
Home team	Score	Away team
Moadon HaCarmel	3–1	Hapoel Tel Hanan
SK Nes Tiona	2–3	Hapoel Kiryat Ono

=== Fifth round ===
The remaining 14 clubs played 7 matches to set the 7 clubs that will qualify to the sixth round.

Home team	Score	Away team
Maccabi Ramla		Hapoel Kiryat Ono
Beitar Lod		Maccabi Bat Yam
Hapoel Or Yehuda		Hapoel Tiberias
Moadon HaCarmel	0–2	Hapoel Kiryat Shalom
Hapoel HaMechonit	4–0	Maccabi Ramat Gan
Hapoel Hulyot		Hapoel Be'er Ya'akov
Hapoel Herzliya	w/o	Hapoel Neot Mordechai

=== Sixth round ===
12 Liga Leumit clubs joined the 16 winning teams from previous round to play 15 cup ties, with Hapoel Rehovot receiving a bye to the next round. Most matches were played on 21 June 1958, with the match between Maccabi Sha'arayim and Shimshon Tel Aviv being postponed to the next week.

Home team	Score	Away team
Hapoel Hadera	0–2 (a.e.t.)	Hapoel Haifa
Hapoel Afula	5–3 (a.e.t.)	Maccabi Rehovot
Hapoel Jerusalem	1–0	Hapoel Kfar Saba
Hapoel Herzliya	1–12	Hapoel Tel Aviv
Hapoel Ramat Gan	1–0	Maccabi Jaffa
Hakoah Tel Aviv	0–4	Hapoel Petah Tikva
Maccabi Petah Tikva	2–0	Hapoel Kiryat Haim
Hapoel Kiryat Shalom	2–1 (a.e.t.)	Maccabi Ramla
Maccabi Sha'arayim	0–5	Shimshon Tel Aviv
Maccabi Haifa	2–0	Hapoel Mahane Yehuda
Hapoel Hulyot	1–2	Hapoel Hamechonit
Beitar Tel Aviv	0–2	Beitar Jerusalem
Maccabi Bat Yam	0–2	Maccabi Tel Aviv
Hapoel Tiberias	2–1 (a.e.t.)	Maccabi Hadera
Maccabi Netanya	2–1	Bnei Yehuda Tel Aviv

Bye: Hapoel Rehovot

=== Seventh round ===
Home team	Score	Away team
Hapoel Tel Aviv	0–1	Maccabi Tel Aviv
Beitar Jerusalem	3–0	Maccabi Netanya
Hapoel Haifa	4–0	Hapoel HaMechonit
Hapoel Jerusalem	4–0	Hapoel Rehovot
Hapoel Tiberias	1–4	Hapoel Petah Tikva
Maccabi Petah Tikva	2–2	Shimshon Tel Aviv
Hapoel Kiryat Shalom	2–0	Hapoel Afula
Hapoel Ramat Gan	2–1	Maccabi Haifa

==== Replay ====
Home team	Score	Away team
Shimshon Tel Aviv	1–0	Maccabi Petah Tikva

=== Quarter-finals ===
5 July 1958

Maccabi Tel Aviv	2–0 (f) (Note: The match was abandoned at the 44th minute after the Hapoel Petah Tikva players attacked the referee. The match was given to Maccabi Tel Aviv, and an appeal was denied.)	Hapoel Petah Tikva
Aharonskind 25'; Goldstein 44'

Basa Stadium, Tel Aviv

5 July 1958

Hapoel Ramat Gan	1–0	Hapoel Jerusalem
Pulver 65'

Attendance: 1,500
Referee: Werner

5 July 1958

Hapoel Haifa	3–0	Hapoel Kiryat Shalom
Parselani 28'; Rubinstein 50'; Nestenfober 75'

Attendance: 2,000
Referee: Davidovich

6 September 1958

Beitar Jerusalem	0–1	Shimshon Tel Aviv
		Cohen 88' (pen.)

Referee: Menachem Ashkenazi

=== Semi-finals ===
20 September 1958

Maccabi Tel Aviv	6–0	Shimshon Tel Aviv
R. Levi 6' (pen.), 32', 35', 38', 54'; Y. Glazer 16'

Katamon, Jerusalem
Attendance: 6,000
Referee: Fried

20 September 1958

Hapoel Ramat Gan	0–2	Hapoel Haifa
		Čajkovski 60'; Ginzburg 90'

Basa Stadium, Tel Aviv
Attendance: 6,000
Referee: Friezner

=== Final ===
30 September 1958

Maccabi Tel Aviv	2–0	Hapoel Haifa
R. Levi 24' (pen.); Y. Glazer 53'

Ramat Gan Stadium
Attendance: 8,000
Referee: Werner
