= 1959–60 Liga Bet =

Israeli football season

The 1959–60 Liga Bet season saw Hapoel HaMechonit, Hapoel Herzliya, Hapoel Lod and Maccabi Sha'arayim win their regional divisions, and qualify for promotion play-offs. Hapoel Herzliya and Maccabi Sha'arayim won the promotion play-offs and promoted to Liga Alef.

== North Division A ==
| Pos | Team | Pld | W | D | L | GF | GA | GD | Pts | Qualification or relegation |
|---|---|---|---|---|---|---|---|---|---|---|
| 1 | Hapoel HaMechonit | 28 | – | – | – | 81 | 22 | +59 | 48 | Promotion play-offs |
| 2 | Hapoel Afula | 28 | – | – | – | 85 | 43 | +42 | 42 | |
| 3 | A.S. Kiryat Bialik | 28 | – | – | – | 65 | 40 | +25 | 36 | |
| 4 | Hapoel Acre | 28 | – | – | – | 59 | 39 | +20 | 36 | |
| 5 | Hapoel Safed | 28 | – | – | – | 50 | 33 | +17 | 35 | |
| 6 | Hapoel Nahariya | 28 | – | – | – | 58 | 50 | +8 | 30 | |
| 7 | Hapoel Tel Hanan | 28 | – | – | – | 55 | 48 | +7 | 28 | |
| 8 | Hapoel Pardes Hanna (Note: Hapoel Pardes Hanna replaced Hapoel Hulyot, which were folded at the start of the season.) | 27 | – | – | – | 40 | 40 | 0 | 26 | |
| 9 | Hapoel Kiryat Shmona | 27 | – | – | – | 44 | 48 | −4 | 25 | |
| 10 | Hapoel Ramat David | 28 | – | – | – | 47 | 72 | −25 | 24 | |
| 11 | Maccabi Zikhron Ya'akov | 28 | – | – | – | 46 | 53 | −7 | 23 | |
| 12 | Hapoel Atlit | 28 | – | – | – | 39 | 53 | −14 | 21 | |
| 13 | Hapoel Kfar Ata | 28 | – | – | – | 34 | 55 | −21 | 20 | |
| 14 | Beitar Binyamina | 28 | – | – | – | 28 | 78 | −50 | 16 | |
| 15 | Hapoel Tirat HaCarmel | 28 | – | – | – | 17 | 74 | −57 | 8 | Relegated to Liga Gimel |

Notes:

Maccabi Tiberias withdrew from the league during the season and their results were nullified.

== North Division B ==
| Pos | Team | Pld | W | D | L | GF | GA | GD | Pts | Qualification or relegation |
|---|---|---|---|---|---|---|---|---|---|---|
| 1 | Hapoel Herzliya | 30 | – | – | – | 103 | 22 | +81 | 52 | Promotion play-offs |
| 2 | Hapoel Nahliel | 30 | – | – | – | 83 | 18 | +65 | 51 | |
| 3 | Hapoel Kiryat Ono | 30 | – | – | – | 80 | 37 | +43 | 39 | |
| 4 | Hapoel Ganei Tikva | 30 | – | – | – | 55 | 41 | +14 | 39 | |
| 5 | Hapoel Givat Haim | 30 | – | – | – | 74 | 61 | +13 | 37 | |
| 6 | Beitar Netanya | 30 | – | – | – | 56 | 27 | +29 | 36 | |
| 7 | Hapoel Even Yehuda (Note: Hapoel Even Yehuda withdrew from the league at the end of the season. as a result, the spare place in the division was filled by promoting extra club from Liga Gimel in the following season.) | 30 | – | – | – | 77 | 64 | +13 | 33 | Relegated to Liga Gimel |
| 8 | Hapoel Ra'anana | 30 | – | – | – | 60 | 54 | +6 | 32 | |
| 9 | Maccabi Pardes Hanna | 30 | – | – | – | 65 | 62 | +3 | 26 | |
| 10 | Beitar Mahane Yehuda | 30 | – | – | – | 59 | 71 | −12 | 25 | |
| 11 | Hapoel Givat Olga | 30 | – | – | – | 50 | 72 | −22 | 23 | |
| 12 | Maccabi Neve Shalom | 30 | – | – | – | 48 | 62 | −14 | 22 | |
| 13 | Beitar Beit Lid | 30 | – | – | – | 38 | 70 | −32 | 20 | |
| 14 | Hapoel Dora Netanya | 30 | – | – | – | 49 | 74 | −25 | 19 | |
| 15 | Hapoel Beit Lid | 30 | – | – | – | 25 | 62 | −37 | 19 | Relegated to Liga Gimel |
| 16 | Hapoel Tel Mond | 30 | – | – | – | 18 | 143 | −125 | 5 | Relegated to Liga Gimel |

== South Division A ==
| Pos | Team | Pld | W | D | L | GF | GA | GD | Pts | Qualification or relegation |
|---|---|---|---|---|---|---|---|---|---|---|
| 1 | Hapoel Lod | 30 | – | – | – | 84 | 22 | +62 | 52 | Promotion play-offs |
| 2 | Maccabi Ramla | 30 | – | – | – | 79 | 33 | +46 | 42 | |
| 3 | Hapoel HaTzafon Tel Aviv | 30 | – | – | – | 57 | 36 | +21 | 41 | |
| 4 | Maccabi Ramat Gan | 30 | – | – | – | 69 | 43 | +26 | 39 | |
| 5 | Maccabi Shmuel Tel Aviv | 30 | – | – | – | 72 | 49 | +23 | 33 | |
| 6 | Maccabi Ramat Amidar | 30 | – | – | – | 42 | 43 | −1 | 33 | |
| 7 | Beitar Holon | 30 | – | – | – | 55 | 48 | +7 | 29 | |
| 8 | Hapoel Kiryat Shalom | 30 | – | – | – | 42 | 43 | −1 | 29 | |
| 9 | Hapoel Yehud | 30 | – | – | – | 32 | 37 | −5 | 28 | |
| 10 | Maccabi Bat Yam | 30 | – | – | – | 55 | 51 | +4 | 27 | |
| 11 | Maccabi Jerusalem | 30 | – | – | – | 45 | 52 | −7 | 26 | |
| 12 | Hapoel Azor | 30 | – | – | – | 38 | 54 | −16 | 26 | |
| 13 | Beitar Lod | 30 | – | – | – | 38 | 64 | −26 | 24 | |
| 14 | YMCA Jerusalem | 30 | – | – | – | 38 | 62 | −24 | 21 | |
| 15 | Hapoel HaTzafon Jerusalem | 30 | – | – | – | 43 | 78 | −35 | 20 | Relegated to Liga Gimel |
| 16 | HaKochav Or Yehuda | 30 | – | – | – | 22 | 96 | −74 | 8 | Relegated to Liga Gimel |

== South Division B ==
| Pos | Team | Pld | W | D | L | GF | GA | GD | Pts | Qualification or relegation |
|---|---|---|---|---|---|---|---|---|---|---|
| 1 | Maccabi Sha'arayim | 30 | – | – | – | 148 | 24 | +124 | 55 | Promotion play-offs |
| 2 | Hapoel Holon | 30 | – | – | – | 99 | 25 | +74 | 52 | |
| 3 | Hapoel Rishon LeZion | 30 | – | – | – | 85 | 29 | +56 | 44 | |
| 4 | SK Nes Tziona | 30 | – | – | – | 95 | 31 | +64 | 43 | |
| 5 | Hapoel Or Yehuda | 30 | – | – | – | 67 | 51 | +16 | 39 | |
| 6 | Hapoel Ashkelon | 30 | – | – | – | 68 | 48 | +20 | 38 | |
| 7 | Beitar Ramla | 30 | – | – | – | 78 | 57 | +21 | 33 | |
| 8 | Hapoel Be'er Ya'akov | 30 | – | – | – | 58 | 61 | −3 | 29 | |
| 9 | Hapoel Marmorek | 30 | – | – | – | 61 | 58 | +3 | 25 | |
| 10 | Beitar Be'er Sheva | 30 | – | – | – | 40 | 74 | −34 | 25 | |
| 11 | Maccabi Gedera | 30 | – | – | – | 47 | 99 | −52 | 20 | |
| 12 | Beitar Jaffa | 30 | – | – | – | 47 | 88 | −41 | 18 | |
| 13 | Hapoel Merhavim | 30 | – | – | – | 28 | 91 | −63 | 18 | |
| 14 | Hapoel Gedera | 30 | – | – | – | 33 | 86 | −53 | 17 | |
| 15 | Hapoel Shmuel Be'er Sheva | 30 | – | – | – | 36 | 91 | −55 | 15 | Relegated to Liga Gimel |
| 16 | Hapoel Kiryat Malakhi | 30 | – | – | – | 16 | 93 | −77 | 9 | Relegated to Liga Gimel |

== Promotion play-offs ==
A promotion play-off was played between the two winners of the North divisions, and another promotion play-off was played between the two winners of the South divisions. the play-offs format was of two legs, with a decisive match played in neutral venue, if two teams are level. the play-off winners set to be promoted to Liga Alef.

=== North play-off ===
11 June 1960

| Hapoel HaMechonit | 0 – 2 | Hapoel Herzliya |

Kiryat Haim Stadium
Attendance: 2,500
18 June 1960

| Hapoel Herzliya | 3 – 0 | Hapoel HaMechonit |

Hapoel Herzliya Ground
Attendance: 4,000

Hapoel Herzliya promoted to Liga Alef.

=== South play-off ===
11 June 1960

| Maccabi Sha'arayim | 2 – 1 | Hapoel Lod |

Maccabi Rehovot Ground
Attendance: 4,000
18 June 1960

| Hapoel Lod | 1 – 0 | Maccabi Sha'arayim |

Hapoel Lod Ground
Attendance: 5,000
2 July 1960

| Maccabi Sha'arayim | 1 – 0 | Hapoel Lod |

Hapoel Stadium, Giv'atayim
Attendance: 3,500

Maccabi Sha'arayim promoted to Liga Alef.
