= 1961–62 in Israeli football =

Football in Israel
- Season: 1961–62

Men's football
- Liga Leumit: Hapoel Petah Tikva
- Liga Alef: Hakoah Tel Aviv
- Liga Bet: Hapoel Safed; Hapoel Hadera; Hapoel Lod; Hapoel Holon
- State Cup: Maccabi Haifa

The 1961–62 season was the 14th season of competitive football in Israel and the 36th season under the Israeli Football Association, established in 1928, during the British Mandate.

== Review and Events ==
- The national team completed their involvement in the 1962 World Cup qualification, playing Italy during October 1961. The team stunned Italy in the first match by taking a 2–0 lead in the first half of the first match, played at Ramat Gan Stadium, only to concede 4 goals in the second half, and then losing 0–6 in the second leg.
- At the end of the season, Liga Alef was expanded from 14 clubs to 16 clubs, as 2 clubs relegated from the league at the end of the season and the 4 winners of Liga Bet promoted to Liga Alef. This also meant that at the end of the season the 8 relegated teams from Liga Bet were replaced by 10 promoted clubs from Liga Gimel.

== Domestic leagues ==
=== Promotion and relegation ===
The following promotions and relegations took place at the end of the season:

Promoted to Liga Leumit

- Hakoah Tel Aviv^{1}

Promoted to Liga Alef

- Hapoel Safed
- Hapoel Hadera
- Hapoel Lod
- Hapoel Holon

Promoted to Liga Bet

- Beitar Kiryat Shmona
- Beitar Binyamina
- Hapoel Bnei Nazareth
- Hapoel Dora Netanya
- Beitar Kiryat Ono
- Hapoel Givatayim
- ASA Jerusalem
- Beitar Harari Tel Aviv
- Hapoel Ofakim
- Hapoel Kiryat Gat

Relegated from Liga Leumit

- Maccabi Netanya

Relegated from Liga Alef

- Maccabi Hadera
- Hapoel Rehovot

Relegated from Liga Bet

- Hapoel Tel Hanan
- Hapoel Beit HaShita
- Hapoel Pardesiya
- HaCarmel Club Haifa
- Maccabi Jerusalem
- Hapoel Ein Karem
- Hapoel Bnei Zion
- Beitar Jaffa

1. Hakoah Tel Aviv merged with Maccabi Ramat Gan to form Hakoah Maccabi Ramat Gan. The merged club took Hakoah Tel Aviv's place in Liga Leumit.

== Domestic cups ==
=== Israel State Cup ===
The 1961–62 Israel State Cup started on 12 February 1961, during the previous season, and was carried over the summer break and finished with the replayed final on 7 May 1962, in which Maccabi Haifa defeated Maccabi Tel Aviv 5–2.

On 24 March 1962, the next season's competition began, and was carried over to the next season.

== National Teams ==
=== National team ===
==== 1962 World Cup qualification (UEFA Group 7, final round) ====
Pos	Team	Pld	W	D	L	GF	GA	GD	Pts
1	Italy	2	2	0	0	10	2	+8	4
2	Israel	2	0	0	2	2	10	−8	0

==== 1961–62 matches ====
15 October 1961 1962 FIFA World Cup qualification	Israel	2–4	Italy	Ramat Gan
	Stelmach 15'; Young 38'	Report	Lojacono 53' (pen.); Altafini 79'; Corso 87', 90'	Stadium: Ramat Gan Stadium; Attendance: 45,000; Referee: (Bulgaria) Takov

22 October 1961 Friendly	Israel	1–1	South Korea	Ramat Gan
	Stelmach 86'		Chung Soon-Chun 10'	Stadium: Ramat Gan Stadium; Attendance: 30,000; Referee: (Israel) Dudai

4 November 1961 1962 FIFA World Cup qualification	Italy	6–0	Israel	Turin
	Sivori 16', 52', 65', 88'; Corso 59'; Angelillo 69'	Report		Stadium: Stadio Comunale; Attendance: 60,799; Referee: (Spain) Asensi

9 November 1961 Friendly (unofficial)	England U-23	7–1	Israel	Leeds
	Byrne 15', 70'; F. Hill 18', 53'; Farmer 40'; S. Hill 74'; Harris 86'		S. Levi 8'	Stadium: Elland Road; Attendance: 12,419; Referee: (Israel) Ashkenazi

14 December 1961 Friendly	Israel	0–2	Yugoslavia	Ramat Gan
			Galić 36', 57'	Stadium: Ramat Gan Stadium; Attendance: 25,000; Referee: (Italy) Adami

16 May 1962 Friendly	Turkey	1–0	Israel	Istanbul
	Lefter 55' (pen.)			Stadium: Mithat Paşa Stadium; Attendance: 30,000; Referee: (Socialist Federal Republic of Yugoslavia) Škorić
