= 1954–55 Liga Gimel =

Israeli football season

The 1954–55 Liga Gimel season was the last in which Liga Gimel was the third tier of Israeli football, as the new Liga Leumit became the top division, Liga Alef became the second tier, and Liga Bet became the third tier.

Hapoel Tirat HaCarmel, Hapoel Even Yehuda, Beitar Mahane Yehuda, Maccabi Shmuel Tel Aviv, Hapoel HaMegabesh Rishon LeZion and Hapoel Mefalsim won their regional divisions and promoted to Liga Bet, the new third tier, whilst Hapoel Tel Hanan, Maccabi Binyamina, Hapoel Bnei Brak\Kiryat Ono, Shimshon Tel Aviv and Maccabi Ramla were also promoted.

When the W-D-L record is not similar to the total number of matches played, the missing matches were declared 0-0 without points by the Israel Football Association.

== North Division ==
Pos	Team	Pld	W	D	L	GF	GA	GD	Pts	Promotion
1	Hapoel Tirat HaCarmel	22	18	3	1	71	19	+52	39	Promoted to Liga Bet
2	Hapoel Tel Hanan	22	17	4	1	63	17	+46	38	Promoted to Liga Bet
3	Ortodoxim Haifa	22	13	4	5	50	30	+20	30	
4	Beitar Haifa	22	11	2	9	45	40	+5	24	
5	Hapoel Zvi Nahariya	22	9	3	10	42	49	−7	21	
6	Maccabi Rosh Pinna	21	9	2	10	51	42	+9	20	
7	Hapoel Safed	22	9	2	11	37	40	−3	20	
8	Maccabi Safed	22	10	0	12	32	47	−15	20	
9	Degel Yehuda Haifa	21	8	2	11	40	39	+1	18	
10	Kibbutz Galuyot Haifa	22	4	5	13	24	55	−31	13	
11	Homenetmen Haifa	21	4	4	13	18	47	−29	12	
12	Kadima Nahariya	21	1	3	17	9	57	−48	5	

== Samaria Division ==
Pos	Team	Pld	W	D	L	GF	GA	GD	Pts	Promotion
1	Hapoel Even Yehuda	18	13	2	3	65	24	+41	28	Promoted to Liga Bet
2	Maccabi Binyamina	18	13	1	4	55	27	+28	27	Promoted to Liga Bet
3	Beitar Netanya	18	10	3	5	55	29	+26	23	
4	Beitar Binyamina	18	9	5	4	51	33	+18	23	
5	Hapoel Zikhron Ya'akov	18	10	2	6	54	37	+17	22	
6	Hapoel Pardes Hanna	15	5	4	6	18	26	−8	14	
7	Hapoel Shimon Netanya	17	6	1	10	27	40	−13	13	
8	Hapoel Nahsholim	17	6	1	10	31	48	−17	13	
9	Hapoel HaHotrim	18	4	3	11	25	41	−16	11	
10	Beitar Alona	17	0	0	17	9	85	−76	0	

== Sharon Division ==
Pos	Team	Pld	W	D	L	GF	GA	GD	Pts	Promotion
1	Beitar Mahane Yehuda	26	17	7	2	89	26	+63	41	Promoted to Liga Bet
2	Hapoel Bnei Brak\Kiryat Ono	26	18	4	4	99	35	+64	40	Promoted to Liga Bet
3	Hapoel Herzliya	26	19	2	5	81	32	+49	40	
4	Hapoel Saqiya Alef	26	18	2	6	80	30	+50	38	
5	Maccabi Ein Ganim	26	17	3	6	95	44	+51	37	
6	Hapoel Yehud	25	17	0	8	56	37	+19	34	
7	Hapoel Hadar Ramatayim	26	13	4	9	58	38	+20	30	
8	Kadima Jaffa	26	12	1	13	60	54	+6	25	
9	Hapoel Ganei Tikva	26	10	2	14	49	61	−12	22	
10	Beitar Saqiya Alef	26	7	3	16	24	51	−27	17	
11	Beitar Ramat Gan	26	6	2	18	28	95	−67	14	
12	Hapoel Beit Dagan	25	5	1	19	31	78	−47	11	
13	Maccabi Ramatayim	24	4	1	19	23	96	−73	9	
14	Maccabi Yehud	26	1	0	25	8	104	−96	2	

== Middle Division ==
Pos	Team	Pld	W	D	L	GF	GA	GD	Pts	Promotion
1	Maccabi Shmuel Tel Aviv	25	21	2	2	99	19	+80	44	Promoted to Liga Bet
2	Shimshon Tel Aviv	25	20	3	2	93	12	+81	43	Promoted to Liga Bet
3	Hapoel Jaffa	25	19	2	4	95	17	+78	40	
4	Hapoel Ever HaYarkon	25	15	2	8	59	36	+23	32	
5	Hapoel Azor	25	11	6	8	46	46	0	28	
6	Hapoel Lod	25	12	3	10	64	36	+28	27	
7	Degel Zion Tel Aviv	24	12	3	9	61	48	+13	27	
8	Hapoel Holon	25	11	3	11	41	51	−10	25	
9	Beitar Givat Aliyah	25	8	2	15	38	78	−40	18	
10	Beitar Holon	24	7	3	14	32	68	−36	17	
11	Maccabi Holon	25	5	3	17	24	64	−40	13	
12	Maccabi Lod	25	4	3	18	24	85	−61	11	
13	Beitar Ezra	25	3	0	22	19	102	−83	6	
14	Bar Kokhba Tel Aviv (Note: Bar Kokhba Tel Aviv entered the league in the second round.)	13	2	1	10	12	45	−33	5	

== Central Division ==
Pos	Team	Pld	W	D	L	GF	GA	GD	Pts	Promotion
1	Hapoel HaMegabesh Rishon LeZion	26	17	6	3	69	30	+39	40	Promoted to Liga Bet
2	Maccabi Ramla	25	16	4	5	59	31	+28	36	Promoted to Liga Bet
3	Hapoel Ramla	26	14	7	5	55	30	+25	35	
4	Hapoel Nes Tziona	26	16	2	8	59	44	+15	34	
5	Beitar Yehuda Jerusalem	26	10	8	8	50	40	+10	28	
6	Hapoel Be'er Ya'akov	25	11	6	8	42	38	+4	28	
7	Hapoel HaGibor Jerusalem	25	12	3	10	45	33	+12	27	
8	Kochav HaTzafon Jerusalem	26	11	5	10	49	40	+9	27	
9	Hapoel Marmorek	26	10	3	13	46	49	−3	23	
10	Kochav HaDarom Nes Tziona	26	7	8	11	36	47	−11	22	
11	Beitar Ramla	26	7	5	14	21	40	−19	19	
12	HaKochav Lod	26	7	3	16	34	58	−24	17	
13	Beitar Lod	25	3	6	16	20	68	−48	12	
14	HaPortzim Jerusalem	24	4	2	18	26	64	−38	10	

== Negev Division ==
Pos	Team	Pld	W	D	L	GF	GA	GD	Pts	Promotion
1	Hapoel Mefalsim	12	12	0	0	40	2	+38	24	Promoted to Liga Bet
2	Hapoel Shoval	11	8	1	2	35	12	+23	17	
3	Hapoel Migdal Ashkelon	11	5	1	5	18	18	0	11	
4	Hapoel Yuval Gad	12	3	3	6	19	31	−12	9	
5	Hapoel Yoav	11	3	1	7	18	34	−16	7	
6	Hapoel Kiryat Malakhi	11	2	2	7	14	30	−16	6	
7	Hapoel Be'er Sheva	8	1	0	7	5	22	−17	2	
