= 1960–61 Liga Bet =

Israeli football season

The 1960–61 Liga Bet season saw Hapoel HaMechonit, Beitar Netanya, Maccabi Ramla and SK Nes Tziona win their regional divisions, and qualify for promotion play-offs. Beitar Netanya and Maccabi Ramla won the promotion play-offs and promoted to Liga Alef.

== North Division A ==
Pos	Team	Pld	W	D	L	GF	GA	GD	Pts	Qualification or relegation
1	Hapoel HaMechonit	30	–	–	–	74	32	+42	47	Promotion play-offs
2	Hapoel Safed	30	–	–	–	92	38	+54	45	
3	A.S. Kiryat Bialik	30	–	–	–	69	37	+32	40	
4	Maccabi Zikhron Ya'akov	30	–	–	–	61	47	+14	35	
5	Hapoel Nahariya	30	–	–	–	61	52	+9	33	
6	Hapoel Acre	30	–	–	–	59	56	+3	32	
7	Hapoel Tel Hanan	30	–	–	–	54	65	−11	31	
8	Hapoel Kfar Ata	30	–	–	–	65	48	+17	30	
9	Hapoel Afula	30	–	–	–	53	66	−13	30	
10	Beitar Tel Amal Haifa	30	–	–	–	52	55	−3	29	
11	Hapoel Kiryat Shmona	30	–	–	–	46	62	−16	26	
12	Hapoel Ramat David	30	–	–	–	53	71	−18	23	
13	Hapoel Atlit	30	–	–	–	37	60	−23	21	
14	Hapoel Yagur	30	–	–	–	36	60	−24	21	
15	Hapoel Geva	30	–	–	–	58	87	−29	18	Relegated to Liga Gimel
16	Beitar Binyamina	30	–	–	–	41	76	−35	17	Relegated to Liga Gimel

== North Division B ==
Pos	Team	Pld	W	D	L	GF	GA	GD	Pts	Qualification or relegation
1	Beitar Netanya	30	–	–	–	58	17	+41	53	Promotion play-offs
2	Hapoel Kiryat Ono	30	–	–	–	70	28	+42	45	
3	Hapoel Nahliel	30	–	–	–	70	28	+42	41	
4	Hapoel Givat Haim	30	–	–	–	76	51	+25	40	
5	Hapoel Netanya	30	–	–	–	62	43	+19	40	
6	Hapoel Pardes Hanna	30	–	–	–	48	40	+8	33	
7	Hapoel Ganei Tikva	29	–	–	–	45	43	+2	30	
8	Maccabi Pardes Hanna	30	–	–	–	36	39	−3	30	
9	Hapoel Givat Olga	30	–	–	–	48	51	−3	27	
10	Hapoel Ra'anana	30	–	–	–	41	46	−5	27	
11	Beitar Mahane Yehuda	30	–	–	–	58	61	−3	26	
12	Maccabi Neve Shalom	30	–	–	–	33	48	−15	25	
13	Beitar Beit Lid	30	–	–	–	50	73	−23	21	
14	Hapoel Pardesiya	30	–	–	–	42	68	−26	17	
15	Hapoel Karkur	29	–	–	–	20	78	−58	12	Relegated to Liga Gimel
16	Hapoel Dora Netanya	30	–	–	–	34	80	−46	11	Relegated to Liga Gimel

== South Division A ==
Pos	Team	Pld	W	D	L	GF	GA	GD	Pts	Qualification or relegation
1	Maccabi Ramla	30	–	–	–	68	22	+46	46	Promotion play-offs
2	Hapoel Lod	30	–	–	–	70	26	+44	46	
3	Maccabi Shmuel Tel Aviv	30	–	–	–	71	35	+36	42	
4	Maccabi Jerusalem	30	–	–	–	46	41	+5	33	
5	Maccabi Bat Yam	30	–	–	–	52	39	+13	31	
6	YMCA Jerusalem	30	–	–	–	35	48	−13	30	
7	Maccabi Ramat Amidar	30	–	–	–	39	33	+6	29	
8	Hapoel HaDarom Tel Aviv	30	–	–	–	40	42	−2	28	
9	Beitar Lod	30	–	–	–	32	53	−21	28	
10	Hapoel Azor	30	–	–	–	42	51	−9	27	
11	Hapoel HaTzafon Tel Aviv	30	–	–	–	32	43	−11	27	
12	Beitar Holon	30	–	–	–	51	52	−1	26	
13	Maccabi Ramat Gan	30	–	–	–	44	61	−17	26	
14	Hapoel Yehud	30	–	–	–	37	60	−23	24	
15	Hapoel Kiryat Shalom	30	–	–	–	28	43	−15	22	Relegated to Liga Gimel
16	Hapoel Zikhronot	30	–	–	–	28	66	−38	12	Relegated to Liga Gimel

== South Division B ==
Pos	Team	Pld	W	D	L	GF	GA	GD	Pts	Qualification or relegation
1	SK Nes Tziona	30	–	–	–	85	18	+67	50	Promotion play-offs
2	Hapoel Holon	30	–	–	–	82	20	+62	48	
3	Beitar Ramla	30	–	–	–	77	35	+42	46	
4	Maccabi Holon	30	–	–	–	86	34	+52	42	
5	Hapoel Rishon LeZion	30	–	–	–	60	35	+25	41	
6	Hapoel Or Yehuda	29	–	–	–	50	53	−3	32	
7	Hapoel Ashkelon	30	–	–	–	50	51	−1	28	
8	Hapoel Be'er Ya'akov	29	–	–	–	44	47	−3	28	
9	Beitar Be'er Sheva	29	–	–	–	40	50	−10	27	
10	Hapoel Merhavim	30	–	–	–	43	68	−25	27	
11	Hapoel Eilat	30	–	–	–	44	51	−7	26	
12	Maccabi Rehovot	30	–	–	–	38	53	−15	22	
13	Beitar Jaffa	30	–	–	–	31	60	−29	19	
14	Hapoel Marmorek	30	–	–	–	50	79	−29	18	
15	Maccabi Gedera	29	–	–	–	26	76	−50	12	Relegated to Liga Gimel
16	Hapoel Gedera	30	–	–	–	24	89	−65	10	Relegated to Liga Gimel

== Promotion play-offs ==
A promotion play-off was played between the two winners of the North divisions, and another promotion play-off was played between the two winners of the South divisions. the play-offs format was of two legs, with a decisive match played in neutral venue, if two teams are level. the play-off winners set to be promoted to Liga Alef.

=== North play-off ===
8 July 1961

Beitar Netanya	1 – 0	Hapoel HaMechonit

Beitar Netanya Ground
Attendance: 3,000
Referee: Werner
15 July 1961

Hapoel HaMechonit	1 – 4	Beitar Netanya

Municipal Stadium, Haifa
Attendance: 2,000
Referee: Handwerk

Beitar Netanya promoted to Liga Alef.

=== South play-off ===
1 July 1961

SK Nes Tziona	0 – 2	Maccabi Ramla

S.K. Nes Tziona Ground
Attendance: 4,000
Referee: Werner
8 July 1961

Maccabi Ramla	2 – 1	SK Nes Tziona

Maccabi Jaffa Ground, Tel Aviv
Attendance: 4,000
Referee: Dudai

Maccabi Ramla promoted to Liga Alef.
