= 1961–62 Liga Bet =

Israeli football league season

The 1961–62 Liga Bet season saw Hapoel Safed, Hapoel Hadera, Hapoel Lod and Hapoel Holon promoted to Liga Alef as the respective winners of their regional divisions.

== North Division A ==
Pos	Team	Pld	W	D	L	GF	GA	GD	Pts	Promotion or relegation
1	Hapoel Safed	30	–	–	–	122	40	+82	49	Promoted to Liga Alef
2	Hapoel HaMechonit	30	–	–	–	95	33	+62	47 (Note: No points or goals were awarded for the Hapoel HaMechonit - Hapoel Yagur due to suspicions of bribery in the match, which ended 9-0.)	
3	Hapoel Nahariya	30	–	–	–	63	35	+28	42	
4	Hapoel Kfar Ata	30	–	–	–	72	47	+25	38	
5	A.S. Kiryat Bialik	30	–	–	–	62	51	+11	36	
6	Maccabi Zikhron Ya'akov	30	–	–	–	69	42	+27	34	
7	Hapoel Kiryat Shmona	30	–	–	–	62	57	+5	32	
8	Beitar Haifa	30	–	–	–	63	66	−3	27	
9	Hapoel Acre	30	–	–	–	46	57	−11	26	
10	Hapoel Atlit	30	–	–	–	42	55	−13	25	
11	Hapoel Afula	30	–	–	–	59	73	−14	25	
12	Hapoel Kfar Blum	30	–	–	–	67	61	+6	21	
13	Hapoel Yagur	30	–	–	–	38	55	−17	20	
14	Hapoel Ramat David	30	–	–	–	35	95	−60	20	
15	Hapoel Tel Hanan	30	–	–	–	30	74	−44	19	Relegated to Liga Gimel
16	Hapoel Beit HaShita	30	–	–	–	32	78	−46	17	Relegated to Liga Gimel

== North Division B ==
Pos	Team	Pld	W	D	L	GF	GA	GD	Pts	Promotion or relegation
1	Hapoel Hadera	30	–	–	–	74	13	+61	51	Promoted to Liga Alef
2	Hapoel Nahliel	30	–	–	–	76	26	+50	47	
3	Hapoel Givat Haim	30	–	–	–	89	52	+37	41	
4	Maccabi Neve Shalom	30	–	–	–	57	33	+24	38	
5	Hapoel Netanya	29	–	–	–	69	36	+33	36	
6	Hapoel Kiryat Ono	30	–	–	–	47	32	+15	36	
7	Hapoel Ra'anana	30	–	–	–	54	41	+13	29	
8	Hapoel Herzliya	30	–	–	–	45	44	+1	29	
9	Hapoel Ganei Tikva	30	–	–	–	38	56	−18	25	
10	Beitar Beit Lid	28	–	–	–	40	76	−36	24	
11	Hapoel Pardes Hanna	30	–	–	–	36	62	−26	22	
12	Hapoel Givat Olga	30	–	–	–	40	68	−28	22	
13	Beitar Mahane Yehuda	30	–	–	–	44	68	−24	20	
14	Maccabi Pardes Hanna	30	–	–	–	47	72	−25	20	
15	Hapoel Pardesiya	30	–	–	–	41	62	−21	19	Relegated to Liga Gimel
16	HaCarmel Club Haifa	29	–	–	–	22	78	−56	13	Relegated to Liga Gimel

== South Division A ==
Pos	Team	Pld	W	D	L	GF	GA	GD	Pts	Promotion or relegation
1	Hapoel Lod	30	–	–	–	96	21	+75	54	Promoted to Liga Alef
2	Maccabi Ramat Gan	30	–	–	–	81	49	+32	42	
3	YMCA Jerusalem	30	–	–	–	65	26	+39	38	
4	Maccabi Ramat Amidar	30	–	–	–	36	26	+10	38	
5	Beitar Holon	30	–	–	–	63	44	+19	34	
6	Maccabi Bat Yam	30	–	–	–	48	42	+6	34	
7	Hapoel Bat Yam	30	–	–	–	50	45	+5	32	
8	Beitar Lod	30	–	–	–	44	50	−6	28	
9	Hapoel Azor	30	–	–	–	45	47	−2	27	
10	Maccabi Shmuel Tel Aviv	30	–	–	–	42	51	−9	27	
11	Hapoel Yehud	30	–	–	–	54	69	−15	27	
12	Hapoel HaTzafon Tel Aviv	30	–	–	–	42	58	−16	24	
13	Hapoel HaDarom Kiryat Shalom (Note: Hapoel HaDarom Tel Aviv merged with Hapoel Kiryat Shalom.)	30	–	–	–	48	64	−16	23	
14	Hapoel Ya'akov Kfar Saba	30	–	–	–	51	64	−13	22	
15	Maccabi Jerusalem	30	–	–	–	49	75	−26	22	Relegated to Liga Gimel
16	Hapoel Ein Karem	30	–	–	–	35	95	−60	10	Relegated to Liga Gimel

== South Division B ==
Pos	Team	Pld	W	D	L	GF	GA	GD	Pts	Promotion or relegation
1	Hapoel Holon	30	–	–	–	71	19	+52	48	Promoted to Liga Alef
2	SK Nes Tziona	30	–	–	–	76	21	+55	47	
3	Hapoel Rishon LeZion	30	–	–	–	72	34	+38	45	
4	Maccabi Holon	30	–	–	–	71	36	+35	39	
5	Beitar Ramla	30	–	–	–	66	35	+31	38	
6	Hapoel Ashkelon	30	–	–	–	58	43	+15	33	
7	Beitar Be'er Sheva	30	–	–	–	52	62	−10	29	
8	Hapoel Eilat	30	–	–	–	49	52	−3	27	
9	Hapoel Or Yehuda	30	–	–	–	43	56	−13	27	
10	Hapoel Sderot	30	–	–	–	50	76	−26	26	
11	Hapoel Be'er Ya'akov	30	–	–	–	37	47	−10	25	
12	Maccabi Rehovot	30	–	–	–	50	71	−21	25	
13	Hapoel Merhavim	30	–	–	–	49	78	−29	25	
14	Hapoel Marmorek	30	–	–	–	45	55	−10	22	
15	Hapoel Bnei Zion	30	–	–	–	34	55	−21	22	Relegated to Liga Gimel
16	Beitar Jaffa	30	–	–	–	16	99	−83	4	Relegated to Liga Gimel
