= 1960–61 Israel State Cup =

Tournament details
- Country: Israel

Final positions
- Champions: Hapoel Tel Aviv (6th Title)
- Runners-up: Hapoel Petah Tikva

The 1959–61 Israel State Cup (Hebrew: גביע המדינה, Gvia HaMedina) was the 22nd season of Israel's nationwide football cup competition and the seventh after the Israeli Declaration of Independence.

The competition began on 30 January 1960, two months after the conclusion of the former competition. Further rounds, until the eighth round, were played during the remainder of the 1959–60 season. Disagreements within the IFA caused a delay of over 5 months in the competition, and the quarter and semi finals were played in December 1960.

The final was held at the Ramat Gan Stadium on 1 February 1961. Hapoel Tel Aviv, appearing in its first final since 1941, defeated Hapoel Petah Tikva 2–1, winning its 6th cup.

== Results ==
=== Sixth round ===
Home team	Score	Away team
Maccabi Holon	3–2	Maccabi Rehovot
Hapoel Mahane Yehuda	5–2	Hapoel Netanya
Beitar Jerusalem	3–2	Sektzia Nes Tziona
Hapoel Kiryat Gat	0–2	Hapoel Be'er Sheva
Maccabi Ramla	3–0	Hapoel Nahariya
Hapoel Kfar Saba	1–1 (a.e.t.)	Beitar Ramla
Beitar Lod	0–1	Hapoel HaTzafon Tel Aviv
Hapoel Nahliel	2–1	Hapoel Rehovot
Hapoel Karkur	1–0	Hapoel Holon
Hapoel Kiryat Malakhi	w/o	Hapoel Pardes Hanna
Hapoel HaTzafon Jerusalem	5–1	Hapoel Givat Haim
Hapoel Hadera	4–0	Hapoel Hatzor
Maccabi Hadera	4–3	Maccabi Sha'arayim
Maccabi Ramat Amidar	3–2	Hapoel Afula
Hapoel Kiryat Haim	7–0	Hapoel Be'eri
Maccabi Ramat Gan	2–0	Hapoel Marmorek

Byes: Hakoah Tel Aviv, Hapoel Herzliya, Hapoel Ramla, Shimshon Tel Aviv.

==== Replay ====
Home team	Score	Away team
Beitar Ramla	5–3	Hapoel Kfar Saba

=== Seventh round ===
Home team	Score	Away team
Maccabi Tel Aviv	9–0	Maccabi Holon
Hapoel Karkur	0–8	Hapoel Haifa
Maccabi Ramat Gan	1–3	Hapoel Petah Tikva
Maccabi Netanya	9–0	Beitar Ramla
Bnei Yehuda Tel Aviv	4–0	Maccabi Ramat Amidar
Maccabi Haifa	5–0	Maccabi Hadera
Hapoel Jerusalem	5–1	Hapoel HaTzafon Jerusalem
Maccabi Petah Tikva	w/o (Note: Maccabi Petah Tikva originally won the match 5–1. The match was given to Hapoel HaTzafon Tel Aviv since Maccabi Petah Tikva fielded an ineligible player.)	Hapoel HaTzafon Tel Aviv
Hapoel Ramat Gan	3–1	Maccabi Ramla
Beitar Tel Aviv	1–1 (a.e.t.)	Hapoel Pardes Hanna
Hapoel Herzliya	3–2	Maccabi Jaffa
Hapoel Tel Aviv	2–1	Hapoel Nahliel
Shimshon Tel Aviv	1–3	Hapoel Kiryat Haim
Hapoel Be'er Sheva	2–1	Hakoah Tel Aviv
Beitar Jerusalem	2–1	Hapoel Hadera
Hapoel Mahane Yehuda	1–1 (a.e.t.)	Hapoel Ramla

==== Replays ====
Home team	Score	Away team
Hapoel Pardes Hanna	1–5	Beitar Tel Aviv
Hapoel Ramla	4–0	Hapoel Mahane Yehuda

=== Eighth round ===
25 June 1960	Hapoel Ramat Gan	1–1 (a.e.t.)	Hapoel Petah Tikva
	R.Cohen 43'		A. Ratzabi 61'	Attendance: 4,000; Referee: Frizner

25 June 1960	Hapoel Haifa	1–0	Hapoel Be'er Sheva	Kiryat Eliezer Stadium
	S. Levi 77'			Attendance: 500; Referee: Nemesh

25 June 1960	Maccabi Tel Aviv	1–2	Maccabi Netanya	Maccabiah Stadium, Tel Aviv
	R. Levi 83' (pen.)		Heine 13', 51'	Attendance: 2,000; Referee: Klein

25 June 1960	Bnei Yehuda Tel Aviv	3–5	Hapoel Kiryat Haim	Hatikva Neighborhood Stadium, Tel Aviv
	D. Levi 36' (pen.); Sinuani 80'; Aloni 88'		Cibola 27'; Chimirovski 31', 51', 84'; Levi 86'

25 June 1960	Hapoel Jerusalem	1–1 (a.e.t.)	Hapoel Tel Aviv
	Yehudayoff 100'		Menachem 95'	Attendance: 4,000; Referee: Mizrahi

25 June 1960	Maccabi Haifa	3–1	Hapoel Ramla	Rehovot
	Menchel 48', 80'; Hardy 89'		Levinson 40'	Attendance: 3,000

25 June 1960	Beitar Jerusalem	0–0 (a.e.t.)	Hapoel Herzliya
				Attendance: 4,000

25 June 1960	Beitar Tel Aviv	8–1	Hapoel HaTzafon Tel Aviv	Maccabiah Stadium, Tel Aviv
	Bar-Zion 37', 49', 64', 89'; A. Levi 58'; Haliva 61'; Kalendaroff 77'; Alaluf 85'		Kahlon 17'

==== Replays ====
2 July 1960	Hapoel Petah Tikva	3–2	Hapoel Ramat Gan
	Kaufmann 15'; Z. Ratzabi 36'; Nahari 46'		Schenberg 21'; Pulver 88'	Attendance: 4,000; Referee: Schleifer

2 July 1960	Hapoel Tel Aviv	3–0	Hapoel Jerusalem
	Menachem 46', 84'; Rosenbaum 87'			Attendance: 2,000; Referee: Ashkenazi

2 July 1960	Hapoel Herzliya	2–1	Beitar Jerusalem
	Cohen 86'; Averbuch 89'		Davidoff 4'	Attendance: 3,000

=== Quarter-finals ===
7 December 1960

Hapoel Haifa	2–3	Hapoel Peath Tikva
Nestenfober 22'; Ginzburg 42'		A. Ratzabi 65'; Z. Ratzabi 85'; Stelmach 90'

Attendance: 5,000
Referee: Frizner

7 December 1960

Hapoel Kiryat Haim	1–3	Hapoel Tel Aviv
Oni 20'		S. Cohen 31', 37', 69'

Attendance: 3,000
Referee: Halperin

7 December 1960

Maccabi Netanya	0–1	Maccabi Haifa
		Shapira 5'

Attendance: 1,000
Referee: Ashkenazi

7 December 1960

Beitar Tel Aviv	1–3	Hapoel Herzliya
Haliva 75'		Yurkovich 43' (pen.); G. Cohen 56'; Vigiser 79'

Maccabiah Stadium, Tel Aviv
Attendance: 1,000
Referee: Shoshani

=== Semi-finals ===
21 December 1960

Hapoel Herzliya	0–4	Hapoel Petah Tikva
		Stelmach 35', 53'; Ratzabi 51'; Mizrahi 71'

Maccabiah Stadium, Tel Aviv
Attendance: 5,000
Referee: Akinti

21 December 1960

Hapoel Tel Aviv	1–0	Maccabi Haifa
Borsuk 75'

Hadera
Attendance: 7,000
Referee: Dudai

=== Final ===
1 February 1961

Hapoel Tel Aviv	2–1	Hapoel Petah Tikva
Goldstein 40'; Tish 71'		Kaufmann 4'

Ramat Gan Stadium
Attendance: 40,000
Referee: Ben-Rubi
