= 1947–48 Palestine League =

Palestine League
- Season: 1947-48

The 1947-48 Palestine League was the twelfth and last season of league football in the British Mandate for Palestine. The defending champions were Maccabi Tel Aviv.

The league started on 1 November 1947, after several delays. with only few matches played, one month later, on 30 November 1947, the 1947–1949 Palestine war erupted. As most of the players joined the forces of Haganah, Palmach and Irgun, and due to the difficulty to hold regular league fixtures, the league abandoned.

Nordia Tel Aviv replaced Beitar Tel Aviv as a league member, as the British authorities banned Beitar clubs following claims that their players operated within the Irgun (which were actually right). In order to continue football activities, the Beitar management decided on temporary renaming of all Beitar clubs to Nordia (named after Max Nordau). Maccabi Haifa and Hapoel HaTzafon, winners of Liga Bet North and South divisions, replaced bottom clubs Hapoel Rehovot and Hapoel Herzliya.

Nordia Tel Aviv was top of the table when after the last round of matches, played on 3 January 1948. The leading goal scorer was Yehoshua Glazer with 12 goals.

== League table (as of 3 January 1948) ==
Pos	Team	Pld	W	D	L	GF	GA	GR	Pts
1	Nordia Tel Aviv	6	5	1	0	16	8	2.000	11
2	Maccabi Tel Aviv	5	5	0	0	26	4	6.500	10
3	Hapoel Tel Aviv	6	5	0	1	15	3	5.000	10
4	Maccabi Rehovot	6	3	2	1	16	9	1.778	8
5	Hapoel Petah Tikva	7	3	1	3	15	12	1.250	7
6	Maccabi Petah Tikva	7	3	1	3	16	16	1.000	7
7	Hapoel Haifa	3	2	1	0	14	9	1.556	5
8	Hapoel Ramat Gan	5	2	1	2	14	11	1.273	5
9	Hapoel Rishon LeZion	4	2	0	2	10	14	0.714	4
10	Maccabi Netanya	4	1	0	3	8	13	0.615	2
11	Maccabi Haifa	4	1	0	3	6	14	0.429	2
12	Maccabi Rishon LeZion	5	0	2	3	7	22	0.318	2
13	Maccabi Nes Tziona	3	0	0	3	2	11	0.182	0
14	Hapoel HaTzafon	6	0	0	6	3	23	0.130	0

Updated to match(es) played on 3 January 1948. Source: Aspaklaria Shel HaSport (The Sport Mirror), p. 3,

== Ligat Herum ==
After the abandoning the national league, the Football Association operated an interim league, Ligat Herum (Hebrew: ליגת חירום, lit. Emergency League), which started on 14 February 1948, and consisted only clubs from Tel Aviv and neighboring cities, and depended on the possibilities to hold football matches and of available time. Only a handful of matches were played before Ligat Herum was also abandoned as well.

=== League table (as of 17 April 1948) ===
Pos	Team	Pld	W	D	L	GF	GA	GR	Pts
1	Nordia Tel Aviv	4	3	1	0	12	4	3.000	7
2	Maccabi Tel Aviv	4	2	2	0	14	4	3.500	6
3	Hapoel Tel Aviv	4	2	1	1	16	4	4.000	5
4	Hapoel Petah Tikva	5	2	1	2	9	11	0.818	5
5	Maccabi Petah Tikva	3	0	1	2	4	10	0.400	1
6	Hapoel Ramat Gan	2	0	0	2	2	8	0.250	0
7	Hapoel HaTzafon	2	0	0	2	0	16	0.000	0

Updated to match(es) played on 17 April 1948. Source: IFA,
