= 1937 Liga Bet =

Football season

Liga Bet
- Season: 1937
- Champions: Hapoel Herzliya; Maccabi Nes Tziona

The 1937 Liga Bet season was the second tier league of the Palestine League organized by the EIFA. The North division was won by Hapoel Herzliya, while the southern division was won by Maccabi Nes Tziona. The two divisional winners played for one allocated place in the top division, with Maccabi Nes Tziona winning the play-off. However, Hapoel Herzliya was promoted as well by the league and cup committee.

== North division ==
Pos	Team	Pld	W	D	L	GF	GA	GR	Pts	Qualification or relegation
1	Hapoel Herzliya	8	6	1	1	24	1	24.000	13	Promotion Playoffs
2	Beitar Tel Aviv	8	4	2	2	18	12	1.500	10	
3	Maccabi Haifa	8	3	1	4	11	18	0.611	7	
4	HaKochav Tel Aviv	8	2	1	5	12	16	0.750	5	
5	Maccabi Hadera	8	2	1	5	8	18	0.444	5	

Updated to match(es) played on 13 January 1938. Source: Protocol No. 38/3 IFA (in Hebrew)
Rules for classification: 1) points; 2) goal difference; 3) number of wins; 4) goals scored; 5) head to head; 6)deciding match.

== South division ==
Six clubs played in this division:

- Bar Kochva Jerusalem
- Hapoel Rishon LeZion
- Maccabi Gedera
- Maccabi Nes Tziona (winners, advance to playoff)
- Atid Tel Aviv
- Hapoel Jerusalem

== Play-off ==
20 November 1937

Hapoel Herzliya	4–0	Maccabi Nes Tziona
	Davar

Hapoel Herzliya Ground
4 December 1937

Maccabi Nes Tziona	5–0	Hapoel Herzliya
	Davar

Maccabi Nes Tziona Ground
Attendance: 500
Referee: Hedshoni
