= Hapoel Beit Dagan F.C. =

- Full name: Hapoel Beit Dagan Football Club הפועל בית דגן
- Founded: 1949
- Dissolved: 1964
- League: Liga Gimel
- 1963–64: 9th (Central division)

Hapoel Beit Dagan F.C. (Hebrew: הפועל בית דגן), also called Hapoel Beit Dagon, after the name of the biblical Beit Dagon, was a football club from Beit Dagan, Israel.

== History ==
The club was established in 1949, and entered the second division, finishing ninth in the Jerusalem-South division. For the 1953–54 season, the club played in a regional Hapoel league, rather in Liga Gimel and rejoined the IFA league system for the 1954–55 season. The club remained in Liga Gimel, which became fourth division in 1956, until the end of the 1963–64 season, after which the club folded.
