= Hapoel Gedera F.C. =

Israeli football club

Hapoel Gedera
- Full name: Hapoel Ironi Gedera Football Club
- Founded: 1958 (original club); 2011 (re-establishment)
- Dissolved: 1998
- Ground: Gedera Ground, Gedera
- Capacity: 300
- Manager: Pini Ayash
- League: Liga Bet South B
- 2023–24: Liga Bet South B, 16th
| Home colours | Away colours |

Hapoel Ironi Gedera Football Club (Hebrew: מועדון כדורגל הפועל עירוני גדרה) is an Israeli football club based in Gedera. The club plays in Liga Bet, the fourth tier of the Israeli football league system.

== History ==
The original club was established in 1958 and spent most of its years in the lower tiers of the Israeli football league system, rising, at its best, to Liga Bet, then the third tier, for two seasons in 1959–60 and 1960–61, and for another season, in 1975–76. The original club folded in 1998.

== Re-establishment ==
The club was re-established in 2011 and was placed in the Central division, in which it played since, its best position was 5th, achieved in 2014–15.

== Honours ==
- Liga Gimel
  - 1958–59
  - 1974–75
