= 1934–35 in Mandatory Palestine football =

Football in Mandatory Palestine
- Season: 1934–35

The 1934–35 season was the eighth season of competitive football in the British Mandate for Palestine under the Eretz Israel Football Association and the 3rd under the Arab Palestine Sports Federation.

== IFA Competitions ==
=== 1934–35 Palestine League ===
The competition began in December 1934, the EIFA decided to abandon the competition in early March 1935.

Pos	Team	Pld	W	D	L	GF	GA	GR	Pts	HTA	HPT	HKT	MJR	HHA	MPT	MTA	MNZ	MRV	HJR
1	Hapoel Tel Aviv	8	7	0	1	22	3	7.333	14	—		5–0		2–1	2–0				
2	Hapoel Petah Tikva	5	3	1	1	12	5	2.400	7	2–0	—	1–1			3–0			5–0	
3	Hakoah Tel Aviv	5	3	1	1	8	7	1.143	7			—	3–1						
4	Maccabi Hasmonean Jerusalem	3	2	0	1	8	4	2.000	4		4–1		—						3–0
5	Hapoel Haifa	4	2	0	2	8	6	1.333	4	0–3				—					5–0
6	Maccabi Avshalom Petah Tikva	7	2	0	5	10	14	0.714	4			0–3		1–2	—		3–0 (Note: The match was abandoned with the score 2–2 as a Nes Ziona player was ordered to leave the pitch and refused to do so.)		3–0
7	Maccabi Tel Aviv	3	1	1	1	6	8	0.750	3						4–3	—			
8	Maccabi Nes Tziona	4	1	1	2	4	6	0.667	3	0–1						2–2	—		2–0
9	Maccabi Rehovot	3	1	0	2	3	9	0.333	2	0–4						1–1		—	
10	Hapoel Jerusalem	6	0	0	6	0	19	0.000	0	0–5		0–1							—

Updated to match(es) played on 9 March 1935. Source: EIFA League Tables 1930-1948, p. 32

=== 1935 Palestine Cup ===
Both Maccabi Tel Aviv and Hapoel Tel Aviv opted to forfeit their matches. Maccabi Avshalom Petah Tikva and Hakoah Tel Aviv took advantage of this and made it to the final, the former winning by a single goal.

13 July 1935

Hakoah Tel Aviv	0–1	Maccabi Avshalom Petah Tikva
		Machlis 85'

Maccabiah Stadium
Attendance: 5000
Referee: Marcus

== Notable events ==
=== 1935 Maccabiah Games ===
- Six teams took part in the football tournament of the 1935 Maccabiah Games: Eretz Israel, Poland, Lithuania, England, Germany and Romania. The tournament was won by Romania, with Germany taking second place and Eretz Israel the third.
