= Hapoel HaMechonit F.C. =

Hapoel HaMechonit
- Full name: Hapoel HaMechonit Football Club הפועל המכונית
- Founded: 1957; 69 years ago
- Dissolved: 1966; 60 years ago
- Ground: Hapoel Tel Hanan Ground, Nesher
- 1965–66: Liga Bet North A, 12th
Home colours	Away colours

Hapoel HaMechonit (הפועל המכונית) was an Israeli football club. The club was unique for the fact it represented the Haifa based Kaiser-Frazer (and later Kaiser-Ilin) motor vehicle manufacturer in Israel, rather than representing a city or a sports club, although they were associated with Hapoel association in order to join the Israel Football Association. The club was based in four locations, which were: Ben Dor, (Neighborhood of Nesher), Haifa, Kfar Ata and finally, Tel Hanan (neighborhood of Nesher).

== History ==
The club was founded in 1957 and joined Liga Gimel. In the 1959–60 season, they reached Liga Bet, then the third tier of Israeli football, after that league was expanded to 64 clubs, divided in four regional divisions in that season. HaMechonit won Liga Bet North A division in their debut season in Liga Bet and had to play-off against the North B division winner, Hapoel Herzliya. HaMechonit lost in both legs (0–2, 0–3) and remained in Liga Bet. The same repeated in the following season as well, after HaMechonit won once more their division and lost the promotion play-off, this time against Beitar Netanya (0–1, 1–4). The promotion play-offs were revoked for the 1961–62 season, in which HaMechonit won their division for the third successive time and was included in the list of Liga Alef clubs for the following season. However, the club remained in Liga Bet after it was discovered that their match against Hapoel Yagur, in which they needed to win by at least eight goals and eventually won by a result of 9–0, was fixed. As a result, that match was ruled by the IFA committee as 0–0 without points and Hapoel Safed were promoted instead to Liga Alef.

In February 1963, the club merged with Hapoel Kfar Ata and played home matches in Kfar Ata. However, that merger was short-lived, following the club's failure to achieve promotion to Liga Alef. Seven months later, in September, they merged with Hapoel Tel Hanan to create Hapoel HaMechonit Tel Hanan and moved their home matches to Hapoel Tel Hanan Ground in Nesher. HaMechonit Tel Hanan did not come close to achieve promotion following the merger.

The merger came apart in 1966, due to economic crisis at the Kaiser-Ilin manufacturer, which caused firing of workers and eventually its closure. As a result, HaMechonit name was dropped and Hapoel Tel Hanan continued to play as a separate club.

== Honours ==
=== League ===
Honour	No.	Years
Third tier	2	1959–60, 1960–61
