= Hapoel Even Yehuda F.C. =

- Full name: Hapoel Even Yehuda Football Club הפועל אבן יהודה
- Founded: 1949
- Dissolved: 1960
- League: Liga Bet
- 1959–60: 7th (North B division)

Hapoel Even Yehuda F.C. (Hebrew: הפועל אבן יהודה) was a 1950s-era football club from Even Yehuda, Israel.

== History ==
The club was established in 1949, and entered the second division, finishing seventh in the Sharon division, which meant the club was placed in Liga Gimel (third division) for the next season. The club won its division in 1954–55 and promoted Liga Bet, which became the new third tier, following the restructuring of the Israeli football league system. The club remained in Liga Bet until the end of the 1959–60 season, after which the club folded.

Another club representing the town, M.S. Even Yehuda operated between 1962 and 1973.

== Honours ==
=== League ===
Honour	No.	Years
Third tier	1	1954–55
