= 1961–62 Liga Alef =

Football season

Liga Alef
- Season: 1961-62
- Champions: Hakoah Tel Aviv
- Promoted: Hakoah Tel Aviv
- Relegated: Maccabi Hadera, Hapoel Rehovot
- Matches played: 182
- Goals scored: 539 (2.96 per match)

The 1961–62 Liga Alef season saw Hakoah Tel Aviv win the title and promotion to Liga Leumit.

== Final table ==
Pos	Team	Pld	W	D	L	GF	GA	GD	Pts	Promotion or relegation
1	Hakoah Tel Aviv	26	19	5	2	52	15	+37	43	Promoted to Liga Leumit
2	Maccabi Sha'arayim	26	17	6	3	44	15	+29	40	
3	Hapoel Kiryat Haim	26	10	9	7	41	29	+12	29	
4	Beitar Tel Aviv	26	11	5	10	44	40	+4	27	
5	Hapoel Ramat Gan	26	10	7	9	49	47	+2	27	
6	Beitar Jerusalem	26	8	10	8	36	33	+3	26	
7	Hapoel Mahane Yehuda	26	11	4	11	44	47	−3	26	
8	Hapoel Be'er Sheva	35	7	9	19	23	32	−9	23	
9	Hapoel Ramla	26	8	7	11	31	45	−14	23	
10	Hapoel Kfar Saba	26	7	8	11	39	55	−16	22	
11	Beitar Netanya	26	6	9	11	27	31	−4	21	
12	Maccabi Ramla	26	5	11	10	30	44	−14	21	
13	Maccabi Hadera	26	6	6	14	40	53	−13	18	Relegated to Liga Bet
14	Hapoel Rehovot	26	8	2	16	39	54	−15	18	Relegated to Liga Bet
