= Hapoel HaTzafon Tel Aviv F.C. =

Hapoel HaTzafon Tel Aviv (Hebrew: הפועל הצפון תל אביב) was an Israeli football club based in Tel Aviv. The club played competitive football between 1946 and 1948, and despite playing at the top division, it never completed a season at the division. The club later reformed and played at the lower tiers of the Israeli league.

The sports club, a farm club of Hapoel Tel Aviv, was formed in the mid-1930s, with clubs playing volleyball, basketball, swimming, athletics and youth football. The football club was formed in 1946 and played in the newly created Liga Bet, winning promotion at the end of the season. The team was composed of players from Hapoel Tel Aviv's youth team, which were surplus to the main Hapoel Tel Aviv team.

The team played in the top Palestine League division in the 1947–48 season, but managed to play only 5 matches before the league was abandoned due to the 1948 Palestine War, losing all matches, scoring only 3 goals and conceding 18. The club also played at the 1948 Ligat Herum, but this league was abandoned as well, with the club managing only two matches, losing both of them without scoring a goal and conceding 16 goals.

At the beginning of the 1949–50 Season, the team was invited to re-take its place at the top division. However, as the team had already disbanded during the 1948 Palestine War, the team failed to show to its first three matches and was ejected from the league.

The team had reformed at the beginning of the 1957–58 season, and was placed in Liga Gimel. After two seasons at the bottom tier, the club was promoted to Liga Bet, as the third tier was expanded to 64 teams. The club played in Liga Bet until it was relegated at the end of the 1974–75 season to Liga Gimel, where it remained until the end of the 1987–88 season, in which it disbanded once again and did not enter in the following season.

== Honours ==
=== League ===
Honour	No.	Years
Second tier	1	1946–47
