= Hapoel Pardesiya F.C. =

Israeli football club

Hapoel Pardesiya
- Full name: Hapoel Pardesiya Football Club הפועל פרדסיה נועם
- Founded: 1957
- Ground: Pardesiya Ground, Pardesiya
- Chairman: Einav Muzrafi
- League: Liga Bet South A
- 2023–24: Liga Gimel Sharon, 1st (promoted)
| Home colours | Away colours |

Hapoel Pardesiya (Hebrew: הפועל פרדסיה) is an Israeli football club based in Pardesiya. The club currently plays in Liga gimel sharon division.

The club is named after Noam Levy, a resident of Pardesiya, which played for the youth team of Maccabi Netanya and was killed in an automobile accident while attending a tournament, which was held in Germany, with his team.

== History ==
The club was founded in 1957 and played mostly in the lower divisions of Israeli football. At the end of the 1959–60 season, Pardesiya were promoted to Liga Bet, the third tier of Israeli football at the time, after they finished runners-up in the Promotion play-offs for Liga Gimel clubs. In the 1961–62 season, they finished second bottom in Liga Bet North B division and dropped back to Liga Gimel. The club made an immediate return to Liga Bet and finished the 1963–64 season in the sixth place, their best placing to date. Pardesiya were relegated to Liga Gimel after they finished bottom in the North B division at the end of the 1965–66 season. 41 years later, the club made a return to Liga Bet (which at the time was the fifth tier until 2009 in which it became the fourth tier), after they won Liga Gimel Sharon division in the 2006–07 season. Pardesiya played five more seasons in Liga Bet, this time in the South A division, until the 2011–12 season, in which the club finished bottom and relegated back to Liga Gimel, now the fifth and lowest tier of Israeli football.

In the 2014–15 season, the club won Liga Gimel Sharon division and made a return to Liga Bet.

== Honours ==
=== League ===
| Honour | No. | Years |
|---|---|---|
| Fourth tier | 1 | 1959–60 |
| Fifth tier | 1 | 2015–15 |
| Sixth tier | 1 | 2006–07 |
