= 1962–63 Liga Alef =

Liga Alef
- Season: 1962-63
- Champions: Hapoel Ramat Gan
- Promoted: Hapoel Ramat Gan
- Relegated: Hapoel Safed, Maccabi Ramla
- Matches played: 240
- Goals scored: 675 (2.81 per match)

The 1962–63 Liga Alef season saw Hapoel Ramat Gan win the title and promotion to Liga Leumit.

Hapoel Lod and Maccabi Sha'arayim were also promoted.

The following season, after eight consecutive seasons as a nationwide division, Liga Alef was divided once more into two regional divisions, North and South.

== Final table ==
Pos	Team	Pld	W	D	L	GF	GA	GD	Pts	Promotion or relegation
1	Hapoel Ramat Gan	30	23	5	2	84	22	+62	51	Promoted to Liga Leumit
2	Hapoel Lod	30	20	3	7	44	27	+17	43	Promoted to Liga Leumit
3	Maccabi Sha'arayim	30	17	8	5	57	29	+28	42	Promoted to Liga Leumit
4	Maccabi Netanya	30	18	3	9	76	28	+48	39	
5	Hapoel Mahane Yehuda	30	13	7	10	60	45	+15	33	
6	Hapoel Be'er Sheva	30	11	10	9	37	34	+3	32	
7	Hapoel Kfar Saba	30	11	7	12	41	41	0	28 (Note: No points or goals were awarded for Hapoel Kfar Sava - Maccabi Ramla due to brawl during match.)	
8	Hapoel Hadera	30	9	9	12	33	30	+3	27	
9	Beitar Jerusalem	30	9	9	12	33	44	−11	27	
10	Hapoel Kiryat Haim	30	8	11	11	28	47	−19	27	
11	Beitar Tel Aviv	30	10	6	14	36	47	−11	26	
12	Beitar Netanya	30	8	9	13	26	36	−10	25	
13	Hapoel Holon	30	8	9	13	35	48	−13	25	
14	Hapoel Ramla	30	8	4	18	29	73	−44	20	
15	Hapoel Safed	30	5	7	18	30	67	−37	17	Relegated to Liga Bet
16	Maccabi Ramla	30	3	11	16	26	54	−28	16	Relegated to Liga Bet
