= Maccabi Gedera F.C. =

Maccabi Gedera
- Full name: Maccabi Gedera Football Club מכבי גדרה
- 1960–61: 15th (South B division)

Maccabi Gedera F.C. (Hebrew: מכבי גדרה) was a football club from Gedera, Israel. The club was active from the 1930s to the 1960s, playing two seasons in the second division prior to the Israeli Declaration of Independence.

After the 1948 Arab–Israeli War, the club was promoted to Liga Bet, then the third division, at the end of 1958–59 season, as Liga Bet was expanded to include 64 clubs. The club played two seasons in the third tier, relegating at the end of the 1960–61 season.
