= Hapoel Beit Lid F.C. =

- Full name: Hapoel Beit Lid Football Club הפועל בית ליד
- Founded: 1951
- Dissolved: 1960
- League: Liga Bet
- 1959–60: 15th (North B division)

Hapoel Beit Lid F.C. (Hebrew: הפועל בית ליד), was a football club from the Beit Lid Ma'abara (temporary immigrant camp), Israel. The club was also rarely referred to as Hapoel Shvut Am (Hebrew: הפועל שבות עם), as Shvut Am (lit. The Nation Returns) was the formal name of the camp.

== History ==
The club was established by newly arrived immigrants who were settled in the Ma'abara in 1951 and joined Liga Gimel (third division) for the 1951–52 season. The club was promoted to Liga Bet (second division) by the end of the following season, and remained in Liga Bet, which became third division in 1956 for the next six seasons.

On 16 January 1960, in a league match between the club and Maccabi Neve Shalom, a brawl erupted, initiated by Beit Lid's players and fans, during which the match's referee was severely beaten. The club was suspended from the league a week later and folded.

== Honours ==
- Liga Gimel:
  - Winners (1): 1953–54
