= 1960–61 Liga Alef =

Liga Alef
- Season: 1960-61
- Champions: Hapoel Tiberias
- Promoted: Hapoel Tiberias
- Relegated: Hapoel Hadera, Hapoel Herzliya

The 1960–61 Liga Alef season saw Hapoel Tiberias win the title and promotion to Liga Leumit.

== Final table ==
Pos	Team	Pld	W	D	L	GF	GA	GD	Pts	Promotion or relegation
1	Hapoel Tiberias	26	17	4	5	60	24	+36	38	Promoted to Liga Leumit
2	Hakoah Tel Aviv	26	15	4	7	46	26	+20	34	
3	Maccabi Sha'arayim	26	10	13	3	37	19	+18	33	
4	Hapoel Kfar Saba	26	13	5	8	50	39	+11	31	
5	Hapoel Ramat Gan	26	12	5	9	36	36	0	29	
6	Beitar Jerusalem	26	8	8	10	27	34	−7	24	
7	Maccabi Hadera	26	9	6	11	46	58	−12	24	
8	Hapoel Kiryat Haim	26	8	7	11	39	35	+4	23	
9	Hapoel Be'er Sheva	26	6	11	9	27	29	−2	23	
10	Hapoel Rehovot	26	9	4	13	27	39	−12	22	
11	Hapoel Mahane Yehuda	26	8	6	12	34	47	−13	22	
12	Hapoel Ramla	26	7	8	11	30	44	−14	22	
13	Hapoel Hadera	26	7	6	13	33	41	−8	20	Relegated to Liga Bet
14	Hapoel Herzliya	26	7	5	14	33	54	−21	19	Relegated to Liga Bet
