= Maccabi Ramla F.C. =

Maccabi Ramla
- Full name: Maccabi Ramla Football Club מכבי רמלה
- Nickname: The Bulgarians from Ramla
- Founded: 1953; 2020 (refounded)
- Dissolved: 2024
- Ground: Municipal Stadium, Ramla
- 2023–24: Liga Bet South, 13th (folded)

Maccabi Ramla (Hebrew: מכבי רמלה) was an Israeli football club based in Ramla. The club played two seasons in Liga Alef, then the second tier of Israeli football league system.

== History ==
The club was founded in December 1953 by Ya'akov (Jacques) Asa and Albert Kiyosso, the chairman of Maccabi Bulgaria organization and Maccabi Jaffa, who gave the greeting of Maccabi Jaffa for the newly formed club. The name of Maccabi was given to the club, as the founders were members of Maccabi Bulgaria, the only Jewish sports association in their country of origin, Bulgaria.

The club joined Liga Gimel at the 1954–55 season, in which they finished runners-up at the Central division and promoted to Liga Bet, which became the third tier of Israeli football following restructuring of the Israeli football league system.

After six seasons playing in Liga Bet, Maccabi won the South A division in the 1960–61 season and qualified for the Promotion play-offs, where they beat S.K. Nes Tziona in two legs, 2–0 and 2–1, and promoted to Liga Alef, then the second tier. In Liga Alef, the club narrowly avoided relegation in the 1961–62 season after twelfth-place finish. However, in the following season, Maccabi finished bottom and relegated to Liga Bet. The club suffered further relegation in the 1963–64 season, this time to Liga Gimel, after finished bottom of Liga Bet South B division. In the 1965–66 season, Maccabi won Liga Gimel Jaffa division, and after Promotion play-offs, returned to Liga Bet, where they played in most of their football seasons, with being relegated to Liga Gimel and bouncing back to Liga Bet on several occasions. The club folded in 1996.

== Honours ==
- Liga Bet:
  - Winners (1): 1960–61
  - Runners-up (1): 1959–60
- Liga Gimel:
  - Winners (3): 1965–66, 1971–72, 1983–84
  - Runners-up (1):1954–55
