= Rafi Levi =

Israeli footballer (1938–2021)

Rafi Levi רפי לוי
Personal information
- Date of birth: 22 February 1938
- Place of birth: Holon, Mandatory Palestine
- Date of death: 25 February 2021 (aged 83)
- Place of death: Israel
- Position: Striker

Senior career*
Years	Team	Apps	(Gls)
1954–1960	Maccabi Tel Aviv	96	(56)
1960	Highlands Park		
1960–1961	Maccabi Tel Aviv	1	(0)
1961–1963	Sydney Hakoah		
1964–1965	Highlands Park		
1965–1966	Maccabi Tel Aviv	7	(5)
1966–1972	Highlands Park		
1973	Hapoel Ra'anana		

International career
1958–1960	Israel national team	16	(9)
- * Club domestic league appearances and goals

Rafi Levi (Hebrew: רפי לוי; 22 February 1938 – 25 February 2021) was an Israeli footballer who played as a striker. He spent most of his career in Maccabi Tel Aviv.

== Football career ==
Rafi Levi won the Season Top Scorer award twice. First in the 1957–58 season with 19 goals and the second time around during the 1959–60 season with 15 goals. He also was among the top players leading Maccabi Tel Aviv to two championships and in the 1955–56 and 1957–58 seasons, and two Israeli State Cups (1958 and 1959). Later he played in Australia and South Africa, and retired from football in 1972.

Levi made 17 appearances in Israel national team. His most celebrated international performance came on 10 April 1960 in Belgrade, when Israel faced Yugoslavia in the 1960 Summer Olympics European qualifying group. Playing before a crowd of 35,000 at the Partizan Stadium, Levi scored both of Israel's goals in the 2nd and 67th minutes, securing a 2–1 victory. Yugoslavia, who won the group on goal difference despite finishing level on points with Israel, went on to win the Olympic gold medal at the Rome Games that summer. Israel finished second in the group and did not qualify for the Olympics. The result nonetheless stood as one of the most celebrated performances in Israeli football history. One of the best games was the victory over the Yugoslavia in the 1960 Summer Olympics qualification. In the game Levi scored two goals and was considered one of the heroes (along with the Israeli goalkeeper Ya'akov Hodorov). This victory, one of the most surprising in the history of Israeli football, caused a great wave of elation among Israeli sports fans.

== Honours ==
- Israeli Championship: 1955–56, 1957–58
- State Cup: 1955, 1958, 1959
- National South African Championship: 1960, 1964, 1966, 1968
- South African Cup: 1965, 1966, 1967
- New South Wales Federation Championship: 1961, 1962
- New South Wales Federation Cup: 1961, 1963

== See also ==
- Sports in Israel
