= Avraham Menchel =

Israeli footballer (1935–2023)

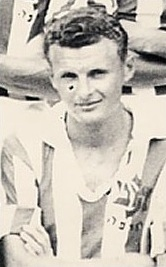

Personal information
- Date of birth: 12 December 1935
- Place of birth: Chernivtsi, Kingdom of Romania
- Date of death: 24 November 2023 (aged 87)
- Position: Midfielder

Senior career*
Years	Team	Apps	(Gls)
1952–1965	Maccabi Haifa	225	(64)

International career
1959–1963	Israel	30	(7)

Managerial career
- 1965–1969: Maccabi Haifa
- * Club domestic league appearances and goals

Avraham Menchel (Hebrew: אברהם מנצ'ל; 12 December 1935 – 24 November 2023) was an Israeli footballer. He is best known for his years at Maccabi Haifa where he started his football career as well as his managerial career. Menchel is widely regarded as one of the best Haifa players to ever don the green shirt. He died on 24 November 2023, at the age of 87.

== Career statistics ==
Scores and results list Israel's goal tally first, score column indicates score after each Menchel goal.

List of international goals scored by Avraham Menchel
No.	Date	Venue	Opponent	Score	Result	Competition
1	12 December 1959	Maharaja College Stadium, Kochi, India	Iran		1–1	1960 AFC Asian Cup qualification
2	17 December 1959	Maharaja College Stadium, Kochi, India	Pakistan		2–2	1960 AFC Asian Cup qualification
3	6 March 1960	Ramat Gan Stadium, Ramat Gan, Israel	Greece		2–1	1960 Summer Olympics qual.
4	22 May 1960	Ramat Gan Stadium, Ramat Gan, Israel	England U23		4–0	Friendly
5	19 October 1960	Hyochang Stadium, Seoul, Korea Republic	South Vietnam		5–1	1960 AFC Asian Cup
6	3 October 1962	Ramat Gan Stadium, Ramat Gan, Israel	Ethiopia		3–0	Friendly
7	17 October 1962	Ramat Gan Stadium, Ramat Gan, Israel	Austria		1–1	Friendly
