= Maccabi Shmuel Tel Aviv F.C. =

Maccabi Shmuel Tel Aviv
- Full name: Maccabi Shmuel Tel Aviv Football Club מכבי שמואל תל אביב
- Founded: 1950
- Dissolved: 1970
- 1969–70: Liga Bet South A, 16th (Relegated)

Maccabi Shmuel Tel Aviv (Hebrew: מכבי שמואל תל אביב) was an Israeli football club based in the Shabazi neighborhood of Tel Aviv. The club played one season in Liga Alef, then the second tier of Israeli football league system.

== History ==
The club, a farm club of Maccabi Tel Aviv, was founded in 1950, in memory of Shmuel Yefet, a former board member of HaKochav Tel Aviv (the previous club which operated in Shabazi neighborhood), who died in the 1948 Arab-Israeli War.

The club started at Liga Gimel, the third tier of Israeli football at the time. After two successive runners-up finish, Maccabi Shmuel won the Middle division in the 1954–55 season and promoted to Liga Bet, which became the new third tier, following restructuring of the Israeli football league system. After eight successive seasons playing at the third tier, Maccabi Shmuel finished third in Liga Bet South A division at the 1962–63 season and promoted to Liga Alef. However, the club's spell in Liga Alef lasted only one season, as they finished second bottom at the South division in the 1963–64 season, winning only four games, and relegated back to Liga Bet. The club played five more seasons in Liga Bet, until 1969–70, in which the club was eventually folded before the end of the season, Following which the club was merged with Maccabi Montefiore, that took Maccabi Shmuel's place in Liga Gimel under the name Maccabi Shmuel Montifiore.

== Honours ==
- Liga Gimel:
  - Winners (1): 1954–55
