= Hapoel Kiryat Shalom F.C. =

Israeli football club

Hapoel Kiryat Shalom
- Full name: Hapoel Kiryat Shalom Football Club מועדון כדורגל הפועל קרית שלום
- Founded: 1957
- Ground: Kiryat Shalom Ground, Tel Aviv
- Manager: Yaron Cohen Tzemach
- League: Liga Gimel Tel Aviv
Home colours	Away colours

Hapoel Kiryat Shalom F.C. (Hebrew: הפועל קרית שלום) is an Israeli football club based in the Kiryat Shalom neighborhood of Tel Aviv. The club is notable for being the first domestic interactive fan-managed sports society, as almost all playing-related decisions were taken through votes on the Web2Sport website.

== History ==
=== Early years ===
The club was established in 1957 and played most of its seasons in the lower divisions, except for eight seasons in the 1960s and the early 1970s in which the club played in third tier Liga Bet. In summer 1961, the club merged with fellow Liga Bet club, Hapoel HaDarom Tel Aviv, and played for a few seasons as Hapoel HaDarom/Kiryat Shalom, finally reverting to its old name in 1965, when the club dropped back to Liga Gimel.

In summer 1969, the club merged with another Tel Aviv club, David Tel Aviv, which played in Liga Bet in order to take its place in the higher division. The club played for one season as Hapoel David Kiryat Shalom, and reverted to its name at the end of it, playing two further seasons in Liga Bet before dropping back to Liga Gimel. The club had another period in Liga Bet, which became fourth tier in 1976, between 1979–80 and 1981–82, but dropped back to Liga Gimel.

=== Web2Sports ===
Web2sport was a web-based company founded by Moshe Hogeg, Shimon Dor, Roy Dvora and Adam Weissberger. Hogeg claimed he was inspired to do after watching Argentina striker Lionel Messi dropped for the game against Germany in the 2006 World Cup. The company purchased Hapoel Kiryat Shalom for €350,000 in June 2007.

Having previously had an average attendance of around 100, the club's first game under the new system was watched online by 6,000 people. However, the first result was a 3–2 loss to Maccabi Ironi Or Yehuda. The club finished fourth in this season, but due to the collapse of the hi-tech market, the company was closed in 2008.

==== Decision making ====
Registered users of the website, of which there were around 8,000 in October 2007, vote on various decisions at the club:

- Between Sunday and Wednesday a vote is held on formation.
- Between Wednesday and matchday (Friday or Saturday) a vote is held on player selection
- Following squad selection, a vote is held on the designated penalty taker for the forthcoming game
- Home games are streamed live on the website, whilst there is radio commentary for away matches, allowing fans to vote on whether to make a substitution, and, if the vote is to do so, whom to take off and bring on. Decisions are relayed to the coach as he has a laptop in the dugouts.

However, in November 2007 it was discovered that opposition fans had been deliberately substituting the club's main striker, Zohar Kaminsky, during games. Following this, new guidelines on voting were announced.

=== Recent years ===
The club plays in Liga Gimel, the lowest tier of the Israeli football league system, in the Tel Aviv division. In 2014–15, the club won the Tel Aviv Division cup and qualified for the nationwide rounds of the State Cup, losing to F.C. Shikun HaMizrach in the sixth round.

== Honours ==
=== League ===
Honour	No.	Years
Fifth tier	1	1978–79

=== Cups ===
Honour	No.	Years
Liga Gimel Tel Aviv Division Cup	1	2014–15

== See also ==
- Crowdsourcing
- MyFootballClub
- Web F.C.
