= Hapoel =

Israeli sports association

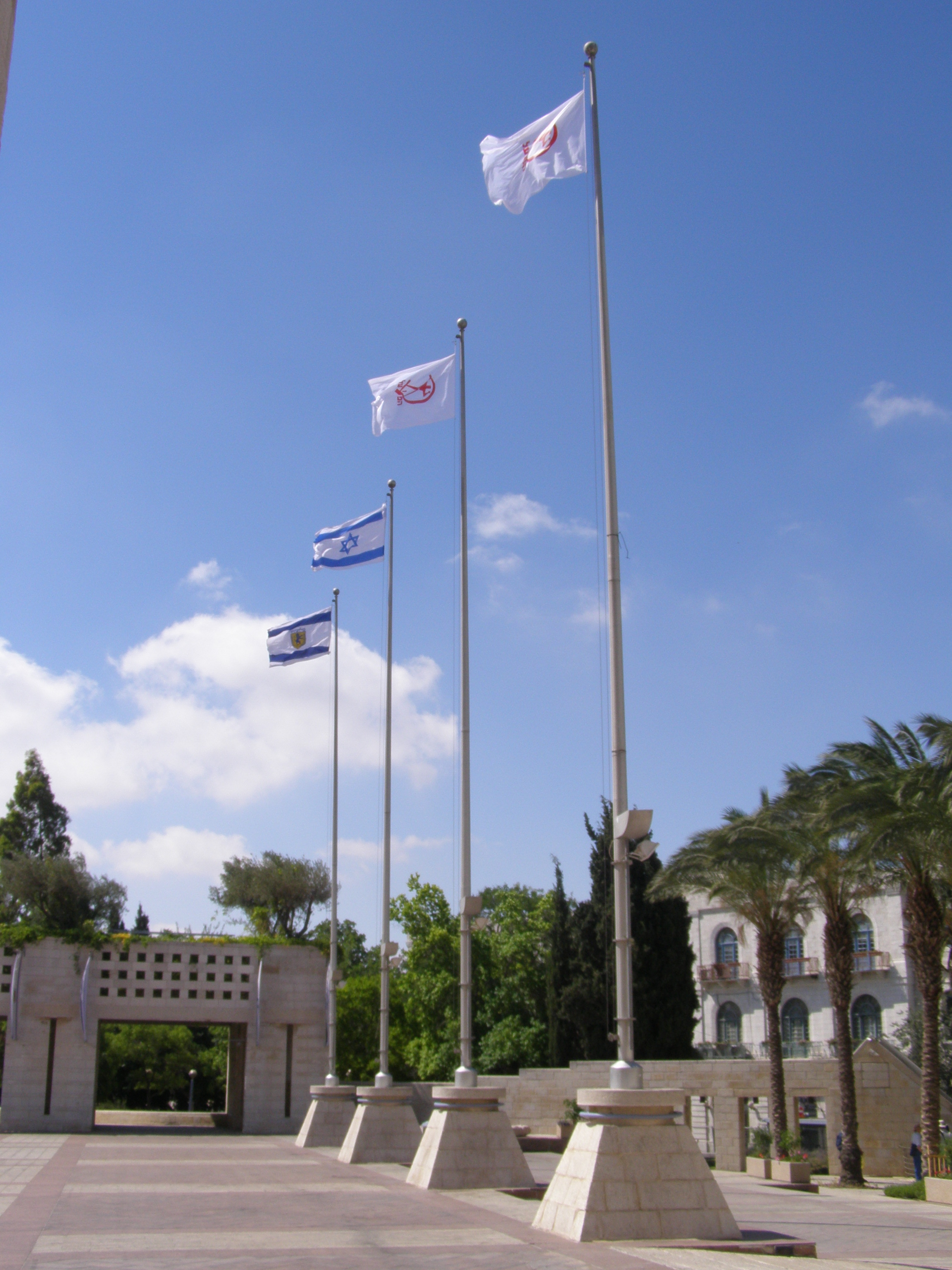
Flags of Hapoel on Safra Square in Jerusalem.

Hapoel (Hebrew: הפועל, lit. 'the worker') is an Israeli Jewish sports association established in 1926 by the Histadrut Labor Federation.

== History ==
During the British Mandate of Palestine period Hapoel had a bitter rivalry with Maccabi and organized its own competitions, with the exception of football, the only sport in which all the organizations played each other. At the time, Hapoel took no part in the Eretz Israel Olympic Committee, which was controlled by Maccabi, and instead sought for international ties with similar workers sports organizations of socialist parties. Therefore, Hapoel became a member of SASI in 1927 and later was a member of CSIT.

After the State of Israel was established, the rival sport organizations reached a 1951 agreement that allowed joint sports associations and competitions open for all Israeli residents.

Hapoel crest uses a variation of the communist symbol, the Hammer and sickle and a Boxer

== General sports clubs ==
- Hapoel Jerusalem
- Hapoel Tel Aviv
- Hapoel Holon
- Hapoel Haifa
- Hapoel Rishon LeZion (handball), Hapoel Rishon LeZion F.C. and others in Rishon LeZion

== Basketball clubs ==
- Hapoel Haifa
- Hapoel Afula
- Hapoel Gilboa Galil
- Hapoel Holon
- Hapoel Jerusalem
- Hapoel Tel Aviv
- Hapoel Be'er Sheva
- Hapoel Galil Elyon

== Football clubs ==
- Hapoel Acre
- Hapoel Afula
- Hapoel Ashdod
- Hapoel Ashkelon
- Hapoel Asi Gilboa
- Hapoel Balfouria
- Hapoel Be'er Sheva
- Hapoel Beit She'an
- Hapoel Bnei Ashdod
- Hapoel Bnei Jadeidi
- Hapoel Bnei Lod
- Hapoel Bnei Tamra
- Hapoel Haifa
- Hapoel Herzliya
- Hapoel Hod HaSharon
- Hapoel Holon
- Hapoel Ironi Kiryat Shmona
- Hapoel Jerusalem
- Hapoel Kfar Saba
- Hapoel Kiryat Gat
- Hapoel Kiryat Shalom
- Hapoel Mahane Yehuda
- Hapoel Marmorek
- Hapoel Mevaseret Zion-Abu Ghosh
- Hapoel Nof HaGalil
- Hapoel Petah Tikva
- Hapoel Ra'anana
- Hapoel Ramat Gan
- Hapoel Rishon LeZion
- Hapoel Tayibe
- Hapoel Tel Aviv
- Hapoel Tiberias
- Hapoel Tzafririm Holon
- Hapoel Umm al-Fahm
- Hapoel Yehud

== See also ==
- Sports in Israel
