= Hapoel Ironi Safed F.C. =

Hapoel Ironi Safed
- Full name: Hapoel Ironi Safed Football Club הפועל עירוני צפת
- Founded: 1951; 75 years ago (as Hapoel Safed); 2011; 15 years ago (as Hapoel Ironi Safed); 2019; 7 years ago (refounded)
- Ground: Municipal Stadium, Safed
- Chairman: Maimon Malul
- Manager: Yossi Sofer
- League: Liga Bet North A
- 2023–24: Liga Gimel Upper Galilee, 4th (promoted)
Home colours	Away colours

Hapoel Ironi Safed (Hebrew: הפועל עירוני צפת) is an Israeli football club who bases in Safed.

== History ==
An Hapoel branch operated in Safed during the British Mandate, as early as 1932 After the establishment of Israel, the club was reorganized and a football section was founded in 1951 and at first played in regional leagues in the Upper Galilee, before joining Liga Gimel in 1954. The club won its Liga Gimel division in 1955–56, but remained in Liga Gimel after losing in the promotion play-offs. A season later, following a merge with another local club, HaChalutz Safed, the club once again won its division and won through the promotion playoffs to secure a promotion to Liga Bet.

They were promoted to the second tier for the first time, after they won Liga Bet North A division in the 1961–62 season. They were relegated back to Liga Bet after second bottom finish in the following season, however, they made an immediate return to Liga Alef, after winning Liga Bet North A division in the 1963–64 season. The club spent three more seasons in Liga Alef, until they finished bottom in the "double season" of 1966–68, and relegated Liga Bet.

In spite of their league placing, the club made a remarkable run in the 1967–68 Israel State Cup, after they eliminated top flight clubs, Hapoel Haifa, by a result of 2–1 after extra time, and Hapoel Be'er Sheva, by a result of 4–3 on penalties, after the match ended in 1–1 draw and reached the Quarter-finals, where they lost 0–1 to Hapoel Petah Tikva.

The club returned to Liga Alef, after they won Liga Bet North A division for the third time in 1971–72. In the 1973–74 season, the club achieved their best placing to date, after they finished seventh in Liga Alef North division. In 1976, following the creation of Liga Artzit, Liga Alef became the third tier of Israeli football, where the club continued to play after they finished eleventh in the 1975–76 season. In the following season, the club finished bottom and relegated to Liga Bet, now as the fourth tier. In the 1983–84 season, the club finished bottom in Liga Bet North A and suffered further relegation, to Liga Gimel, the fifth tier. In 1995 the club folded.

In 2009, Beitar Safed, which played in Liga Alef, and was the only football club in Safed at the time, merged with Hapoel Karmiel to form F.C. Karmiel Safed and moved to play in Karmiel. In order to bring back football to Safed, new club, Alpha Ironi Safed, was founded. However, that attempt failed, as the club existed for one season only. After one season without football in Safed, it was decided in 2011 to bring back Hapoel Safed, 16 years after the original club was folded. The club was refounded as Hapoel Ironi Safed.

In the 2013–14 season, the club won Liga Gimel Upper Galilee division and was promoted to Liga Bet. After an eleventh-place finish in Liga Bet North A division at the following season, the club announced its dissolution prior to the 2015–16 season.

== Honours ==
=== League ===
Honour	No.	Years
Third tier	3	1961–62, 1963–64, 1971–72
Fourth tier	2	1955–56, 1956–57
Fifth tier	1	1985–86, 2013–14

=== Cups ===
Honour	No.	Years
Liga Gimel Upper Galilee Division Cup	1	2013–14
