= Hapoel Herzliya F.C. =

Israeli football club

Hapoel Herzliya
- Full name: Hapoel Herzliya Football Club
- Founded: 1932
- Ground: Herzliya Municipal Stadium, Herzliya
- Capacity: 8,300
- Owner: Eli Hayo Hamo
- Manager: Idan David
- League: Liga Alef South
- 2024–25: Liga Alef South, 3th of 16
Home colours	Away colours

Hapoel Herzliya (Hebrew: הפועל הרצליה) is an Israeli football club based in Herzliya. The club is currently in Liga Alef North division and play their home matches at the Herzliya Municipal Stadium.

== History ==
The Hapoel sport club in Herzliya was established in 1928, and a football section was opened in 1936. Prior to the Israeli Declaration of Independence, the club played six seasons at the top flight, and appeared for the last time in the 1946–47 Palestine League season, where the club relegated.

Following Israeli independence in 1948, the club was placed in Liga Bet, the second division. In 1953–54 they were relegated. the club returned to Liga Alef in the 1960–61 season, and relegated after one season to Liga Bet. However, in the Israel State Cup, the club made history, after they eliminated Maccabi Jaffa, Beitar Jerusalem and Beitar Tel Aviv, and reached the Semi-finals, where they lost to the Israeli champions at the time, Hapoel Petah Tikva, in a result of 0–4. in the 1962–63 season, they returned to Liga Alef after winning promotion play-off against Beitar Haifa. Hapoel remained in the second tier for the next 13 seasons, and their best placing came in the 1969–70 season, in which they finished as runners-up after Hapoel Hadera, which were promoted to the Liga Leumit.

In 1975–76, which was the last season of Liga Alef prior to the creation of Liga Artzit, Hapoel finished only in the fourteenth place, which was not enough to secure a place in the newly formed second tier, thus, the club relegated to the new Liga Alef (now as third tier).

After three seasons in the third tier, the club promoted to Liga Artzit in the 1978–79 season after finishing second in Liga Alef North, and then by winning promotion play-off against Maccabi Kiryat Gat. however, in the following season, their spell in Liga Artzit lasted only one season. as they finished bottom and relegated back to Liga Alef. two seasons later, they finished bottom in Liga Alef South, and relegated to the fourth tier, Liga Bet, where they remained for the next 18 seasons.

In 1999–2000 the club won the South A Division of Liga Bet to win promotion to Liga Alef. In 2002–03 Hapoel won the North Division of Liga Alef and were promoted to Liga Artzit. At the end of the 2006–07 season they finished second from bottom and were relegated back to Liga Alef.

In 2009–10 the club won the South Division of Liga Alef to win promotion to Liga Leumit. in 2011–12 the club finished bottom in Liga Leumit and relegated to Liga Alef, where they play today.

== Current squad ==
As of 10 January 2025

No.	Pos.	Nation	Player
1	GK	ISR	Yahli Nimni
3	DF	ISR	Ilay Majar
4	DF	ISR	Shahar Yair
5	DF	ISR	FGuy Rahamim
6	DF	ISR	Oz Aharon
7	MF	ISR	Elad Magen
8	MF	ISR	Tal Sarig
9	FW	ISR	Yarin Mugrabi
10	MF	ISR	Yahav Hayo Hemo
11	FW	ISR	Yanir Amor
15	DF	ISR	Or Reich
16	DF	ISR	Gil Sellam

No.	Pos.	Nation	Player
17	DF	ISR	Yam Sasson
18	GK	ISR	Barak Schwarzman
19	MF	ISR	Ori Hollander
20	MF	ISR	Amit Shapira
21	MF	ISR	Ofek Werero
23	DF	ISR	Ron Gabay
77	DF	ISR	Idan Avitov
26	MF	ISR	Aviv Negbi

== Honours ==
=== League ===
Honour	No.	Years
Second tier	1	1937
Third tier	2	1959–60, 2009–10
Fourth tier	1	2002–03
Fifth tier	1	1999–2000
