= 1969–70 Israel State Cup =

Tournament details
- Country: Israel

Final positions
- Champions: Maccabi Tel Aviv (14th title)
- Runners-up: Maccabi Netanya

The 1969–70 Israel State Cup (Hebrew: גביע המדינה, Gvia HaMedina) was the 31st season of Israel's nationwide football cup competition and the 16th after the Israeli Declaration of Independence.

The competition started on 20 September 1969 with Liga Gimel and Liga Dalet clubs playing the first round. Liga Bet teams joined the competition in the second round, played on 25 October 1969, and Liga Alef clubs joined the competition in the fourth round. After the fifth round the competition was suspended as the national team prepared for the 1970 FIFA World Cup, and resumed at the beginning of the next season, with Liga Leumit clubs entering the competition on the sixth round, played on 12 September 1970.

The final was played on 7 October 1970 between Maccabi Tel Aviv and Maccabi Netanya, the former winning 2–1 to earn its 14th cup.

== Results ==
=== Second round ===
Home team	Score	Away team
Hapoel Kiryat Tiv'on	w/o	Maccabi Amidar Netanya
M.S. Even Yehuda	2–1	Hapoel Dan
Hapoel Nahariya	w/o	Hapoel Kfar Ruppin
Hapoel Tel Mond	7–2	Hapoel Atlit
Hapoel Afikim	w/o	Hapoel Ramat David
Hapoel Migdal HaEmek	w/o	Hapoel Jatt
Hapoel Safed	w/o	Hapoel Binyamina
Hapoel Majd al-Krum	w/o	Hapoel Naaman
Hapoel Karmiel	4–1 (a.e.t.)	Hapoel Beit Shean
Hapoel Afula	2–0	Hapoel Kiryat Yam
Hapoel Tel Hanan		Ihud Bnei Nazareth
Maccabi Zikhron Ya'akov	2–1	Hapoel Kadima
Hapoel Zikhron Ya'akov	1–0	Maccabi Pardes Hanna
Beitar Dov Netanya	1–0 (a.e.t.)	Hapoel Givat Olga
Hapoel Shefa-'Amr	2–1	Maccabi Tiberias
Maccabi Acre	3–0	Beitar Or Akiva
Hapoel Beit Eliezer	3–2	Hapoel Givat Haim
Hapoel Tzur Moshe	w/o	Hapoel Kiryat Binyamin
Beitar Tiberias	3–1	Beitar Nahariya
Hapoel Kiryat Nazareth	w/o	Hapoel Sde Nahum
Hapoel Kiryat Ata	15–0	Hapoel Kfar HaNassi
Hapoel 'Ara	w/o	Hapoel Kfar Blum
Beitar Kiryat Shmona	3–0	Hapoel Kfar Yona
Beitar Tirat HaCarmel	5–2	Beitar Tel Hanan
Hapoel Ra'anana	9–3	Hapoel Geva
Maccabi Neve Sha'anan	w/o	Beitar Migdal HaEmek
Hapoel Caesarea		Beitar Beit She'an
Maccabi Rehovot	2–0	HaBira Jerusalem
Maccabi HaShikma Ramat Gan	2–0	Hapoel Ramat HaSharon
Beitar Ramat Gan	3–2	Hapoel Gedera
Hapoel Givat Shmuel	4–3	Beitar Herzliya
Beitar Beit Shemesh	2–1	Antonio Jaffa
Hapoel Ginaton	1–1 (a.e.t.); 2–1 p.	Hapoel Tira
Beitar Katamonim	3–0	Beitar Bat Yam
Beitar Jaffa	2–2 (a.e.t.); 2–1 p.	Hapoel Yatzitz
Hapoel Beit Shemesh	3–1	Hapoel Azor
Hapoel Yehud	3–0	Maccabi Kfar Gvirol
Maccabi Be'er Sheva	5–0	Hapoel Ganei Tikva
Maccabi Kafr Qasim	w/o	Hapoel Kiryat Malakhi
Hapoel Dimona	2–1	Maccabi Yavne
Hapoel Ramla	3–1 (a.e.t.)	Maccabi Shmuel Tel Aviv
Maccabi Ramla	10–1	Hapoel Qalansawe
Beitar Holon	8–1	Maccabi Dror Lod
Hapoel Kiryat Shalom	w/o	Maccabi Montefiori
Maccabi Holon	4–2	Hapoel Kiryat Gat
Beitar Ashkelon	w/o	Hapoel Ihud Tzeirei Jaffa

=== Third round ===
Home team	Score	Away team
Hapoel Kiryat Tiv'on		M.S. Even Yehuda
Hapoel Nahariya	4–0	Bnei Acre
Hapoel Tel Mond	w/o	Hapoel Afikim
Hapoel Migdal HaEmek	2–1	Hapoel Safed
Hapoel Majd al-Krum		Hapoel Tzeirei Haifa
Hapoel Karmiel	1–0 (a.e.t.)	Hapoel Afula
Hapoel Tel Hanan	3–1	Maccabi Zikhron Ya'akov
Maccabi HaSharon Netanya	w/o	Beitar Pardes Hanna
Hapoel Zikhron Ya'akov	3–2 (a.e.t.)	Beitar Dov Netanya
Hapoel Shefa-'Amr	4–1	Maccabi Acre
Hapoel Beit Eliezer	4–1	Hapoel Tzur Moshe
Beitar Tiberias	9–5	Hapoel Kiryat Nazareth
Hapoel Kiryat Ata		Hapoel 'Ara
Beitar Kiryat Shmona	w/o	Beitar Tirat HaCarmel
Hapoel Ra'anana	2–1	Maccabi Neve Sha'anan
Hapoel Caesarea	5–2	Hapoel Geva HaCarmel
Maccabi Rehovot	2–0	Hapoel Yeruham
Maccabi HaShikma Ramat Gan	8–0	Hapoel Patish
Beitar Ramat Gan	2–0	Hapoel Givat Shmuel
Beitar Beit Shemesh		Hapoel Ginaton
Beitar Katamonim	4–3	Beitar Jaffa
Hapoel Shikun HaMizrach	1–0	Hapoel Ofakim
Hapoel Beit Shemesh	5–1	Hapoel Rosh HaAyin
Hapoel Ashdod	2–1	Hapoel Yehud
Hapoel Kfar Shalem	1–1 (a.e.t.); 4–2 p.	Maccabi Be'er Sheva
Maccabi Kafr Qasim	w/o	Hapoel Dimona
Hapoel Ramla	2–1 (a.e.t.)	Maccabi Bat Yam
Maccabi Ramla	3–0	Maccabi Ashkelon
Beitar Holon		Shimshon Yeruham
Hapoel Kiryat Shalom		Beitar Rehovot
Maccabi Holon	0–0 (a.e.t.); 3–2 p.	Beitar Ashkelon

=== Fourth round ===
Liga Alef clubs entered the competition on this round. As in previous seasons, The draw was set so that Liga Alef clubs wouldn't be drawn against each other.

3 January 1970	Hapoel Kiryat Shmona	w/o	Hapoel Kiryat Tiv'on

3 January 1970	Hapoel Nahariya	2–0	Hapoel Tiberias
	Rishti 25', 59'

3 January 1970	Hapoel Acre	2–1	Hapoel Tel Mond
	Blum 6'; Edri 60'		Artzi 44'

3 January 1970	Hapoel Migdal HaEmek	1–2	Hapoel Tirat HaCarmel
	? ?'		Lalkin 56'; Vanunu 76'

3 January 1970	Hapoel Ramat Gan	6–0	Hapoel Majd al-Krum	HaMakhtesh Stadium
	Chirik ?', ?'; R. Levi ?' (pen.); Shafir ?'; Trobgoda ?'; Constant ?'			Attendance: 700; Referee: Yunes

3 January 1970	Hapoel Bnei Nazareth	2–0	Hapoel Karmiel	Nazareth Municipal Stadium
	Benisti 43'; Nader 61'			Attendance: 500; Referee: Shapsa

3 January 1970	Hapoel Herzliya	5–1	Hapoel Tel Hanan
	Sakal ?', ?'; Kapitolnik ?'; Lutrowski ?'; Zelikowski ?'		Itzhak ?'

3 January 1970	Maccabi HaSharon Netanya	0–4	Hapoel Nahliel	Hapoel Hadera ground
			Ya'akobovski 46', 57'; Hindi 77'; Arye 77'	Attendance: 200; Referee: Nahmias

3 January 1970	Hapoel Mahane Yehuda	0–3	Hapoel Zikhron Ya'akov
			Sofer 19', 56'; Shlomo 35'

3 January 1970	Hapoel Shefa-'Amr	0–4	Hapoel Kiryat Haim
			Wolgrin 12'; Koldero 15'; Fadal 20'; Shimshon 65'	Referee: Wachsberger

3 January 1970	Beitar Kiryat Tiv'on	1–1 (a.e.t.) (9–8 p)	Hapoel Beit Eliezer
	Appelmann 8'		Amzaleg 90'

3 January 1970	Beitar Tiberias	3–4	Hapoel Netanya
	Ya'ish ?', ?'; Maman ?'		Ro'ash ?', ?', ?', ?'

3 January 1970	Hapoel Hadera	2–1	Hapoel Kiryat Ata	Hapoel Hadera ground
	Ben-Binyamin 1'; Argaz 30'		Glatt 85'	Attendance: 500; Referee: Itzhaki

3 January 1970	Beitar Kiryat Shmona	2–3	Maccabi Hadera
	Zacuto ?', ?'		Hamami ?', ?'; Lavochkin ?' (pen.)

3 January 1970	Maccabi Herzliya	3–2 (a.e.t.)	Hapoel Ra'anana
	Kulik 30'; Kverner 65'; Lanz 97'		Gadiniak 10' (pen.); Manjam 78'	Attendance: 800; Referee: Arpat

3 January 1970	Hapoel Caesarea	0–1	Beitar Netanya	Maccabi Hadera ground
			Aharoni 87' (pen.)	Attendance: 500; Referee: Shalem

3 January 1970	Maccabi Rehovot	w/o (Note: The match was abandoned at the 31st minute. After the second goal scored by Maccabi Rehovot, Beitar Be'er Sheva players protested the goal and the match abandoned.)	Beitar Be'er Sheva
	Mahleb 26'; Lavi 31'		Halfon 25'	Referee: Simchi

3 January 1970	Maccabi Sha'arayim	4–1	Maccabi HaShikma Ramat Gan
	Kind 2'; Cohen 43', 67', 86'		Deinish 38'	Attendance: 500; Referee: Orgad

3 January 1970	Beitar Ramat Gan	1–2	Hapoel Bat Yam
	Fuchs 48'		Bejerano ?'; A. Levi ?'

3 January 1970	Maccabi Ramat Amidar	2–0	Hapoel Ginaton
	Rosner 30'; Konstantinovsky 38'			Attendance: 500; Referee: Pashkar

3 January 1970	Beitar Katamonim	1–3	Hapoel Holon	YMCA Stadium
	Solomon 35'		M. Cohen 72' (pen.); Zeitouni 80', 89'	Referee: Avraham Bar

3 January 1970	Hapoel Kiryat Ono	7–2	Hapoel Rinatya
	Marcheviak 35', 40', 50'; Grin 37'; Ben-Harush 57'; Leizerovich 75'; Stuczynski 90'		Yampuler 14', 16'	Attendance: 500; Referee: Weizmann

3 January 1970	Hapoel Shikun HaMizrach	0–4	Hapoel Rishon LeZion
			M. Cohen 30'; Junger 49', 61'; Levin 73'	Attendance: 800; Referee: Aziz

3 January 1970	Hapoel Beit Shemesh	0–0 (a.e.t.) (2–5 p)	Beitar Lod

3 January 1970	Hapoel Sderot	0–1	Hapoel Ashdod
			Sarousi 3'	Attendance: 600; Referee: Shlomo Levi

3 January 1970	Hapoel Kfar Shalem	w/o	Hapoel Marmorek

3 January 1970	Hapoel Be'er Ya'akov	6–2	Maccabi Kafr Qasim
	R. Wolfer 3', 35'; Hasson 50'; Sapozhnik 53' (pen.); Marcus 58'; Rahmun 88' (o.g.)		Hassan 48'; Sa'id 65'	Attendance: 1000; Referee: Saban

3 January 1970	Hapoel Ramla	3–2	Sektzia Nes Tziona	Ramla Municipal Stadium
	Levi 30'; Miara 75', 80'		Breslevski 55' (pen.); Ovadia 87'	Attendance: 1000; Referee: Shemesh

3 January 1970	Beitar Ramla	1–0	Maccabi Ramla	Ramla Municipal Stadium
	Vizan 18'			Attendance: 1000; Referee: Mandelbaum

3 January 1970	Shimshon Yeruham	w/o	Hapoel Eilat	Dimona

3 January 1970	Hapoel Ashkelon	5–2	Beitar Rehovot

3 January 1970	Hapoel Lod	2–1	Maccabi Holon
	Ben-Shitrit 44', 78'		Rottmann 63'	Attendance: 600; Referee: Bareket

=== Fifth round ===
7 February 1970	Hapoel Ashkelon	1–0	Maccabi Herzliya
	Jean-Claude 65'			Attendance: 1500; Referee: Prohaski

7 February 1970	Hapoel Hadera	1–2 (a.e.t.)	Hapoel Lod	Hapoel Hadera ground
	Artzi 27'		Shitrit 15'; Mish'ali 97'	Attendance: 2000; Referee: Haim Cohen

7 February 1970	Hapoel Zikhron Ya'akov	0–1	Maccabi Sha'arayim
			Peled 42'	Attendance: 1500; Referee: Damari

7 February 1970	Hapoel Ramat Gan	3–3 (0–1 p)	Hapoel Kiryat Ono
	Sason 17'; Pereg 89', 92'		Marcheviak 22', 60', 120'	Referee: Yair Tilinger
	Penalties
	Shafir (penalty missed); R. Levi (penalty missed); Klemo (penalty missed); Pinchi (penalty missed); Wilkomirski (penalty missed)		(penalty scored) Hershko

7 February 1970	Hapoel Nahariya	4–2	Maccabi Hadera
	Fartok 3', 52', 75', 89'		Lavochkin 40' (pen.); Hamami 69'	Attendance: 1500; Referee: Elfasi

7 February 1970	Hapoel Be'er Ya'akov	1–2	Hapoel Bnei Nazareth
	Zeitun 40'		Brand 27'; Feldstein 65' (pen.)	Referee: Ron

7 February 1970	Hapoel Herzliya	1–1 (a.e.t.) (1–2 p)	Hapoel Holon
	Orbach 90'		I. Levi 62'	Attendance: 800; Referee: Avraham Cohen
	Penalties
	Orbach (penalty missed); Hajaj (penalty scored); G. Cohen (penalty missed); Saydun (penalty missed); Schultz (penalty missed)		(penalty scored) Lapardon; (penalty missed) Fatiha; (penalty missed) Schpringer; (penalty scored) Zeitouni

7 February 1970	Beitar Ramla	6–1	Shimshon Yeruham	Ramla Municipal Stadium
	Kadoori 28', 32', 41', 63'; Falah 70'; Meltzinger 87'		? 1'	Attendance: 800; Referee: Nahmias

7 February 1970	Hapoel Nahliel	5–4 (a.e.t.)	Hapoel Bat Yam	Hapoel Hadera ground
	Ya'akobovski 44', 70', 87', 103', 105'		Neheisi 7', 112'; Mahluf 10', 58'	Attendance: 1500; Referee: Ben-Simon

7 February 1970	Beitar Lod	1–1 (a.e.t.) (1–2 p)	Beitar Netanya
	Biber 2'		Rosenstein 68'	Attendance: 200; Referee: Ben-Kiki

7 February 1970	Hapoel Tirat HaCarmel	2–1	Hapoel Kiryat Haim
	Sasson 25'; Schwartzbard 60'		Eichner 3'	Attendance: 1000; Referee: Hoze

7 February 1970	Hapoel Ashdod	0–4	Maccabi Ramat Amidar
			Abeda 16'; Rosner 18', 62', 75'	Attendance: 5000; Referee: Peter

7 February 1970	Hapoel Acre	0–1	Hapoel Kiryat Shmona
			Pahima 75'	Attendance: 2000; Referee: Naaman

7 February 1970	Maccabi Rehovot	0–2	Beitar Kiryat Tiv'on	Hapoel Rehovot ground
			Itzhak 33'; A. Cohen 80'	Attendance: 500; Referee: Aharon Gaon

7 February 1970	Hapoel Ramla	0–1	Hapoel Netanya	Ramla Municipal stadium
			Ro'ash 22'	Attendance: 1500; Referee: Chibi

7 February 1970	Hapoel Rishon LeZion	5–3	Hapoel Kfar Shalem
	Levin 2', 66'; Madmoni 30'; Ofek 50'; Abramovich 62'		Hanin 42', 84' (pen.); Otezi 89'	Attendance: 300; Referee: Glidman

=== Sixth Round ===
Liga Leumit clubs entered the competition in this round. The IFA arranged the draw so each Liga Leumit clubs wouldn't be drawn to play each other.

12 September 1970	Hapoel Tel Aviv	4–0	Beitar Netanya	Bloomfield Stadium
	Feigenbaum 22', 50', 74' Mordechovich 72'			Attendance: 7000; Referee: Yosefson

12 September 1970	Maccabi Tel Aviv	2–1	Hapoel Lod	Bloomfield Stadium
	Assis 50'; Band 54' (pen.)		H. Levi 28' (o.g.)	Attendance: 7000; Referee: Finkelstein

12 September 1970	Shimshon Tel Aviv	w/o	Beitar Kiryat Tiv'on

12 September 1970	Hapoel Bnei Nazareth	4–1	Hakoah Maccabi Ramat Gan	Nazareth Municipal Stadium
	Ramzi 15'; Adnan 94'; Kaed 105'; Josef 120'		Shor 85'	Attendance: 2500; Referee: Ankri

12 September 1970	Beitar Jerusalem	3–1	Hapoel Rishon LeZion	YMCA Stadium
	Robovich 21'; Ben-Ya'akov 60'; Sarusi 90'		Levin 46'	Attendance: 4000; Referee: G. Cohen

12 September 1970	Maccabi Jaffa	3–2	Beitar Ramla	Maccabi Jaffa ground
	Ninio 54'; Leon 70'; Ashkenazi 85'		Izmirli 42'; Meltzinger 59'	Attendance: 1500; Referee: Smadar

12 September 1970	Hapoel Petah Tikva	2–0	Maccabi Sha'arayim	Hapoel Petah Tikva ground
	Hayek 34'; Tzelniker 84'			Attendance: 2500; Referee: Prohaski

12 September 1970	Hapoel Haifa	5–1	Maccabi Ramat Amidar
	Ya'akobovich 30', 70'; Shapira 34'; Tzalka 56'; Vollach 75'		Jildeti 85' (pen.)	Attendance: 4000; Referee: Isaac Cohen

12 September 1970	Maccabi Haifa	2–0	Hapoel Netanya	Haifa Municipal Stadium
	Gershgoren 72'; Y. Levy 90'			Attendance: 2000; Referee: Ashkar

12 September 1970	Hapoel Kiryat Shmona	1–0	Bnei Yehuda
	Kaner 81'			Referee: Bachar

12 September 1970	Hapoel Jerusalem	3–0	Hapoel Kiryat Ono	Hapoel Jerusalem ground
	Ben Rimoz 15'; Singel 64'; Turjeman 90'			Attendance: 1500; Referee: Arafat

12 September 1970	Maccabi Netanya	w/o (Note: Hapoel Tirat HaCarmel failed to show for the match since the players demanded extra payments from the management, and when they were denied, they went on a strike.)	Hapoel Tirat HaCarmel

12 September 1970	Hapoel Be'er Sheva	1–0	Hapoel Nahariya	Vasermil Stadium
	Barad 35'			Attendance: 1500; Referee: Uziel

12 September 1970	Beitar Tel Aviv	0–1	Hapoel Holon	HaMakhtesh Stadium
			Lapardon 72'	Attendance: 1200; Referee: Klein

12 September 1970	Maccabi Petah Tikva	5–2	Hapoel Ashkelon	Hapoel Petah Tikva ground
	I. Seltzer 26'; Z. Seltzer 64' (72); Kinstlich 76', 82'		Jagielka 25'; Jean-Claude 58'	Attendance: 2500; Referee: Aharon Shoshani

12 September 1970	Hapoel Kfar Saba	2–1	Hapoel Nahliel	Hapoel Kfar Saba ground
	Marchinski 20'; Riger 52'		Bushehr 77'	Attendance: 1000; Referee: Yair Tilinger

=== Seventh Round ===
19 September 1970	Hapoel Haifa	1–0 (a.e.t.)	Hapoel Tel Aviv	Kiryat Haim Stadium
	Elkayam 110'			Attendance: 7000; Referee: Moshe Ashkenazi

19 September 1970	Maccabi Netanya	4–1	Hapoel Holon	Maccabi Netanya ground
	Spiegler 6', 58'; Shlomovic 24', 65'		Sorinov 45' (o.g.)	Attendance: 4000; Referee: Aharon Shoshani

19 September 1970	Maccabi Jaffa	0–3	Maccabi Tel Aviv	Bloomfield Stadium
			Ozeri 15'; A. Levi 40' (o.g.); Bar-Nur 67'	Attendance: 7000; Referee: Klein

19 September 1970	Shimshon Tel Aviv	1–2	Hapoel Kfar Saba
	E. Levi 18'		Shum 14'; Marchinski 22'	Attendance: 5000; Referee: Isaac Cohen

19 September 1970	Maccabi Petah Tikva	1–0 (a.e.t.)	Hapoel Petah Tikva	Hapoel Petah Tivka ground
	Spokoiny 98'			Attendance: 4000; Referee: Handwerg

19 September 1970	Hapoel Kiryat Shmona	2–0	Hapoel Bnei Nazareth
	Pahima 46'; Kaner 70'			Attendance: 2000; Referee: Zohar Maymon

19 September 1970	Beitar Jerusalem	1–0 (a.e.t.)	Hapoel Be'er Sheva
	Ben-Ya'akov 101'			Attendance: 3000; Referee: Finkelstein

19 September 1970	Hapoel Jerusalem	1–0	Maccabi Haifa	Hapoel Jerusalem ground
	Mahatbi 60'			Attendance: 3000; Referee: Moshe Mizrahi

=== Quarter-finals ===
29 September 1970	Maccabi Netanya	2–2 (a.e.t.) (3–2 p)	Hapoel Jerusalem	Maccabi Netanya ground
	Topolansky 21'; Shlomovich 45'		Mansur 28'; Hod 48'	Attendance: 6000; Referee: Moshe Ashkenazi
	Penalties
	Spiegler (penalty scored); Shlomovich (penalty scored); Topolansky (penalty scored)		(penalty scored) Ben Rimoz; (penalty missed) Turjeman; (penalty missed) Singel; (penalty scored) Azulai; (penalty missed) Ezra

29 September 1970	Hapoel Kiryat Shmona	1–5	Hapoel Kfar Saba
	Pahima 2'		Marchinski 43', 70', 75'; Fogel 50', 85'	Attendance: 3500; Referee: Klein

29 September 1970	Hapoel Haifa	0–0 (a.e.t.) (2–3 p)	Beitar Jerusalem	Kiryat Haim Stadium
				Attendance: 8000; Referee: Handwerg
	Penalties
	Atzmon (penalty scored); Damti (penalty scored); Englander (penalty missed); Piker (penalty missed); Tzalka (penalty missed)		(penalty missed) Robovich; (penalty missed) Ben-David; (penalty scored) Hacham; (penalty scored) Ben-Ya'akov; (penalty scored) Sarusi

29 September 1970	Maccabi Tel Aviv	1–0	Maccabi Petah Tikva	Bloomfield Stadium
	Assis 44'			Attendance: 7000; Referee: Moshe Mizrahi

=== Semi-finals ===
3 October 1970

Maccabi Tel Aviv	4–3	Hapoel Kfar Saba
Spiegel 11'; Bar-Nur 16'; Assis 76', 84'		Rosen 4' (o.g.); Fogel 32'; Sharf 87'

Hapoel Petah Tikva ground
Attendance: 7000
Referee: Moshe Ashkenazi

3 October 1970

Maccabi Netanya	0–0 (a.e.t.)	Beitar Jerusalem
Penalties
Spiegler (penalty scored); Shlomovich (penalty scored); Topolansky (penalty scored); Amira (penalty scored); Solomon (penalty scored)	5–0	(penalty missed) Ben-David

Bloomfield Stadium, Tel Aviv
Attendance: 17000
Referee: Klein

=== Final ===
7 October 1970

Maccabi Tel Aviv	2–1	Maccabi Netanya
Ozeri 47'; Assis 76'		Spiegler 31'

Bloomfield Stadium, Tel Aviv
Attendance: 22000
Referee: Aharon Shoshani
