= 1967–68 Israel State Cup =

Tournament details
- Country: Israel

Final positions
- Champions: Bnei Yehuda Tel Aviv
- Runners-up: Hapoel Petah Tikva

The 1967–68 Israel State Cup (Hebrew: גביע המדינה, Gvia HaMedina) was the 29th season of Israel's nationwide football cup competition and the 14th after the Israeli Declaration of Independence.

The competition started on 9 September 1967 with a preliminary round, played by 20 Liga Gimel clubs Liga Alef clubs joined the competition in the third round, played on 25 November 1967 and Liga Leumit entered in the fifth round, on 27 April 1968.

Hapoel Petah Tikva and Bnei Yehuda met in the final, played on 12 June 1968, the later winning by a single goal to claim its first cup.

== Results ==
=== Preliminary round ===
20 Liga Gimel teams were drawn in this round. Matches were played on 9 September 1967.

Home team	Score	Away team
Hapoel Dan		Beitar Tiberias
Maccabi Afula		Hapoel Shefa-'Amr
HaShalom Nazareth		Beitar Migdal HaEmek
S.C. Rafi Bat Galim		Hapoel Kiryat Nazareth
Hapoel Kafr Yasif		Hapoel Hever
Hapoel Mitzpe Ramon		Beitar Ofakim
Hapoel Azor		Maccabi Kfar Gvirol
Hapoel Givat HaShlosha		Maccabi Ramat Hen
Hapoel Ezra UBitzaron		Hapoel Ramat HaSharon
Beitar Yehud		Maccabi Rosh HaAyin

=== First round ===
Matches were played on 30 September 1967. 128 teams were drawn to play in this round (including the ties from the previous round). However, since several of the teams drawn quit before the round was played, only 28 matches took place.

Home team	Score	Away team
Hapoel Yir'on	4–6	Beitar Migdal HaEmek
Hapoel Ya'akov Kfar Saba	0–0 (a.e.t.); 5–0 p.	Hapoel Kiryat Nazareth
Beitar Binyamina	3–3 (a.e.t.); 5–6 p.	Hapoel Givat Olga
Hapoel Migdal HaEmek	5–0	Beitar Nahariya
Hapoel Binyamina	0–1	Maccabi Neve Sha'anan
Hapoel Baqa al-Gharbiyye	0–6	Hapoel Hatzor
Maccabi Pardes Hanna	3–0	Al-Ahli Nazareth
Maccabi Or Akiva	2–1	Hapoel Atlit
Tzeirei HaDruzim	4–3 (a.e.t.)	Hapoel Majd al-Krum
Beitar Kiryat Tiv'on	3–0	Beitar Acre
Hapoel Dan	1–3	Beitar Tirat HaCarmel
Maccabi Zikhron Ya'akov	8–0	Hapoel 'Ara
Hapoel Givat Haim	8–1	Hapoel Mesilot
Hapoel Kiryat Shmona	3–0	Hapoel Beit She'an
Hapoel Kafr Qara	1–4	Hapoel Ramat David
Hapoel Sde Nahum	7–0	Beitar Hatzor
Shimshon Nahariya	3–2	Beitar Haifa
Beitar Dov Netanya	5–0	Hapoel Kfar Kama
Beitar Ezra	3–11	Hapoel Or Yehuda
A.S. David Tel Aviv	2–0	Maccabi Ramat Gan
Beitar Harari Bat Yam	1–0	Hapoel Sderot
Hapoel Bat Yam	2–0	HaBira Jerusalem
Hapoel Ramla	3–2	Hapoel Ashdod
Maccabi Be'er Sheva	5–0	Maccabi Kafr Qasim
Hapoel Bnei Zion	4–2	A.S. Or Yehuda
Beitar Ramat Gan	4–0	Hapoel Dimona
Maccabi Shmuel Tel Aviv	4–3	Hapoel Givat HaShlosha
Hapoel Tayibe	0–2	Hapoel Rosh HaAyin

Also qualified from this round:
Maccabi Afula, Beitar al-Amal Nazareth, Hapoel Yardena, Hapoel Tirat HaCarmel, Hapoel Tel Mond, Hapoel Zikhron Ya'akov, Hapoel Afula, Hapoel Beit Eliezer, Hapoel Hod HaSharon, Hapoel Shefayim, Beitar Kiryat Shmona, M.S. Even Yehuda, Hapoel Ahva Haifa, Hapoel HaTzafon Tel Aviv, Hapoel Ganei Tikva, Hapoel Rehovot, Hapoel Qalansawe, Beitar Ganei Tikva, Maccabi Yavne, Hapoel Sde Uziyah, Maccabi HaSharon Netanya, Hapoel Beit Shemesh, Beitar Jaffa, Beitar Beit Shemesh, Maccabi Ramat HaShikma, Maccabi Rehovot, Hapoel Ofakim, Hapoel Ramat HaSharon, Hapoel Mitzpe Ramon, Beitar Holon, Shimshon Ashkelon.

=== Second round ===
Matches were played on 28 October 1967. As in the previous round, resignations and forfeits meant that only 20 of the 32 scheduled matches were played.

Home team	Score	Away team
Hapoel Zikhron Ya'akov	2–0	Hapoel Tirat HaCarmel
Hapoel Ramat David	4–1	Al Ahli Majd al-Krum
Beitar Migdal HaEmek	6–3	Tzeirei HaDruzim
Hapoel Givat Haim	8–4	Maccabi Afula
Maccabi Zikhron Ya'akov	9–2	Hapoel Hod HaSharon
Hapoel Migdal HaEmek	6–3	Beitar Al-Amal Nazareth
Hapoel Beit Eliezer	2–1 (a.e.t.)	Hapoel Tel Mond
M.S. Even Yehuda	5–0	Hapoel Hatzor
Beitar Tirat HaCarmel	1–3	Beitar Kiryat Tiv'on
Beitar Holon	13–2	Beitar Ganei Tikva
Hapoel Ramat HaSharon	5–0	Shimshon Ashkelon
Beitar Harari Bat Yam	7–3 (a.e.t.)	Hapoel Rehovot
Maccabi HaSharon Netanya	3–2	Hapoel Sde Uziyah
Beitar Ramat Gan	10–2	Maccabi Shmuel Tel Aviv
A.S. David Tel Aviv	5–2 (a.e.t.)	Hapoel Ganei Tikva
Maccabi Be'er Sheva	2–1	Beitar Jaffa
Hapoel Bnei Zion	8–2	Beitar Beit Shemesh
Maccabi Ramat HaShikma	4–3 (a.e.t.)	Maccabi Yavne
Maccabi Rehovot	2–0	Hapoel Ofakim
Hapoel Rosh HaAyin	4–1	Hapoel Or Yehuda

Also qualified from this round:
Hapoel Bat Yam, Hapoel Kiryat Shmona, Hapoel Beit Shemesh, Hapoel Ramla, Hapoel HaTzafon Tel Aviv, Hapoel Yardena, Hapoel Ya'akov Kfar Saba, Maccabi Neve Sha'anan, Hapoel Sde Nahum, Beitar Dov Netanya, Hapoel Qalansawe, Shimshon Nahariya

=== Third round ===
Liga Alef clubs entered the competition on this round. As in previous seasons, The draw was set so that Liga Alef clubs wouldn't be drawn against each other. Matches were played on 25 November 1967, with several matches postponed due to weather conditions. These matches were played on 5 December 1967.

Home team	Score	Away team
Hapoel Zikhron Ya'akov	1–4	Hapoel Kfar Saba
Maccabi Petah Tikva	w/o	Hapoel Ramat David
Beitar Migdal HaEmek	1–1 (a.e.t.); 3–4 p.	Hapoel Kiryat Haim
Hapoel Sde Nahum	1–4	Hapoel Hadera
Hapoel Tiberias	2–1	Hapoel Givat Haim
Hapoel Herzliya	6–3 (a.e.t.)	Maccabi Zikhron Ya'akov
Beitar Netanya	11–2	Hapoel Migdal HaEmek
Hapoel Kiryat Shmona	2–1	Hapoel Acre
Hapoel Kfar Blum	6–0	Maccabi Neve Sha'anan
Hapoel Ra'anana	2–1	Hapoel Beit Eliezer
Hapoel Nahliel	7–1	Hapoel Ya'akov Kfar Saba
Hapoel Bnei Nazareth	4–0	M.S. Even Yehuda
Hapoel Netanya	3–2	Beitar Dov Netanya
Maccabi Hadera	5–4	Beitar Tirat HaCarmel
Hapoel Nahariya	9–1	Hapoel Yardena
Hapoel Safed	7–1	Shimshon Nahariya
Beitar Jerusalem	6–1	Beitar Holon
Maccabi Ramat Amidar	5–2 (Note: The first match was abandoned at the 31st minute due to weather conditions with Maccabi Ramat Amidar leading 2–0.)	Hapoel Ramat HaSharon
Hapoel HaTzafon Tel Aviv	w/o (Note: The first match was abandoned at half-time due to weather conditions with a result of 0–0. The second match was abandoned at the 11th minute after Hapoel Marmorek players assaulted the referee, and the tie was given to Hapoel HaTzafon)	Hapoel Marmorek
Beitar Harari Bat Yam	1–0	Beitar Tel Aviv
Hapoel Lod	13–1	Maccabi HaSharon Netanya
Hapoel Holon	2–0	Beitar Ramat Gan
Beitar Ramla	5–1	A.S. David Tel Aviv
Hapoel Kiryat Ono	2–0	Maccabi Be'er Sheva
Hapoel Rishon LeZion	4–1	Hapoel Bnei Zion
Hapoel Ashkelon	7–5	Maccabi Ramat HaShikma
Beitar Be'er Sheva	2–3	Hapoel Ramla
Maccabi Rehovot	3–1	Hapoel Be'er Ya'akov
Hapoel Beit Shemesh	6–0	Beitar Lod
Maccabi Holon	3–2	Hapoel Qalansawe
Hapoel Bat Yam	2–1	Beitar Kiryat Ono
Hapoel Kfar Shalem	2–1	Hapoel Rosh HaAyin

=== Fourth round ===
Matches were held on 30 December 1967, with postponed and abandoned matches (due to weather conditions being played on 23 March 1968. The match between Hapoel Safed and Hapoel Kiryat Ono was delayed even further, and was finally played on 2 April 1968.

Home team	Score	Away team
Hapoel Kfar Saba	2–0	Maccabi Ramat Amidar
Maccabi Petah Tikva	8–1	Hapoel Kfar Shalem
Hapoel Kiryat Haim	0–2	Hapoel Nahliel
Hapoel HaTzafon Tel Aviv	1–3	Hapoel Hadera
Hapoel Tiberias	2–1	Maccabi Hadera
Hapoel Ashkelon	2–0 (Note: The first match was abandoned due to weather conditions, with Hapoel Ashkelon leading 2–0.)	Hapoel Herzliya
Beitar Netanya	4–3	Hapoel Ramla
Hapoel Nahariya	2–1 (a.e.t.)	Hapoel Kiryat Shmona
Hapoel Kfar Blum	5–1	Hapoel Beit Shemesh
Hapoel Ra'anana	3–2	Hapoel Netanya
Beitar Ramla	3–0 (a.e.t.)	Hapoel Bnei Nazareth
Hapoel Safed	5–3 (a.e.t.)	Hapoel Kiryat Ono
Beitar Jerusalem	3–1	Hapoel Rishon LeZion
Hapoel Holon	1–0 (Note: The first match was abandoned due to weather conditions, with Hapoel Holon leading 1–0.)	Beitar Harari Bat Yam
Hapoel Lod	3–2 (a.e.t.)	Hapoel Bat Yam
Maccabi Rehovot	1–0	Maccabi Holon

=== Fifth round ===
Liga Leumit clubs entered the competition in this round. The IFA arranged the draw so each Liga Leumit clubs wouldn't be drawn to play each other.

25 April 1968	Hapoel Tel Aviv	5–0	Beitar Ramla	Bloomfield Stadium
	Feigenbaum 6', 26', 45', 87' (pen.); Ben Baruch 36'			Attendance: 1500; Referee: Moshe Mizrahi

27 April 1968	Hapoel Kfar Saba	0–2	Maccabi Tel Aviv
			Bar-Nur 26', 52'	Attendance: 4000; Referee: Klein

27 April 1968	Shimshon Tel Aviv	2–1 (a.e.t.)	Hapoel Holon	Bloomfield Stadium
	E. Levi 76'; Romano 104'		Zeitouni 20'	Attendance: 2000; Referee: Avraham Cohen

27 April 1968	Hakoah Maccabi Ramat Gan	1–1 (a.e.t.); 3–1 p.	Hapoel Tiberias
	I. Levi 8'		Ya'ish 40'	Attendance: 800; Referee: Uziel

27 April 1968	Beitar Jerusalem	0–0 (a.e.t.); 0–3 p.	Maccabi Sha'arayim
				Attendance: 6000; Referee: Moshe Ashkenazi

27 April 1968	Maccabi Jaffa	0–2	Maccabi Petah Tikva	Maccabi Jaffa ground
			Feinberg 70'; Spokoiny 81'	Attendance: 1000; Referee: Ankri

27 April 1968	Hapoel Ashkelon	2–0	Hapoel Mahane Yehuda
			A. Levi 21'; Harari 71'	Attendance: 1800; Referee: Arie Refael

27 April 1968	Maccabi Rehovot	0–3	Hapoel Ramat Gan
			R. Cohen 23', 25'; Perl 26' (pen.)	Attendance: 4000; Referee: Rabinovich

27 April 1968	Hapoel Kfar Blum	1–5	Hapoel Petah Tikva
	Kerner 63'		Rotkovich 22'; Kalina 30'; Stelmach 55', 90'; Hazum 85'	Referee: Lanciano

27 April 1968	Hapoel Safed	2–1 (a.e.t.)	Hapoel Haifa	Safed Municipal Stadium
	Suissa 55'; Ohana 120'		Puni 24' (o.g.)	Attendance: 1200; Referee: Damari

27 April 1968	Sektzia Nes Tziona	5–1	Hapoel Nahliel
	Azulai 21'; Zweig 51'; Ben-Shimon 58' (pen.); Stamberg 86'; Sharabi 89' (o.g.)		Arie 14'	Attendance: 300; Referee: Porhaski

27 April 1968	Hapoel Ra'anana	1–0	Hapoel Jerusalem	Hapoel Ra'anana ground
	Chirik 52'			Attendance: 300; Referee: Atali

27 April 1968	Maccabi Netanya	4–2	Hapoel Lod	Maccabi Netanya Stadium
	Shlomovich 13'; Spiegler 41' (pen.); Rubinstein 70'; Rosenzweig 89'		Bronstein 60', 88'	Referee: Gaon

27 April 1968	Hapoel Be'er Sheva	3–1	Beitar Netanya	Hapoel Be'er Sheva Ground
	Offer 13' (pen.), 89' (pen.); Numa 78'		Ben-Ya'akov 80'	Referee: Maymon Zohar

27 April 1968	Bnei Yehuda	3–0	Hapoel Hadera	Bloomfield Stadium
	Mag'er 18'; Nahmias 71'; Aloni 84'			Attendance: 1200; Referee: Finkelstein

27 April 1968	Maccabi Haifa	4–0	Hapoel Nahariya	Haifa Municipal Stadium
	Baliti 11', 54'; Sasson 30'; Shmulevich 58'			Referee: Ben-Itzhak

=== Sixth round ===
4 May 1968	Hapoel Ramat Gan	0–1	Maccabi Petah Tikva	HaMakhtesh Stadium
			Kinstlich 76'	Attendance: 2500; Referee: Marin

4 May 1968	Hapoel Ashkelon	1–2	Shimshon Tel Aviv
	Jagielka 30'		Darhi 76'; Damti 79'	Attendance: 2200; Referee: Finkelstein

4 May 1968	Maccabi Netanya	4–1	Sektzia Nes Tziona	Maccabi Netanya Stadium
	Topolansky 37', 40'; Rubinstein 70'; Solomon 73' (pen.)		Zweig 79'	Attendance: 1000; Referee: Folk

4 May 1968	Hapoel Safed	1–1 (a.e.t.); 4–3 p.	Hapoel Be'er Sheva	Hapoel Safed ground
	Ohana 108'		Dekel 117'	Attendance: 2000; Referee: Handwerk

4 May 1968	Maccabi Tel Aviv	0–2 (a.e.t.)	Hapoel Petah Tikva
			Stelmach 96'; Sharabi 98'	Attendance: 6000; Referee: Moshe Mizrahi

4 May 1968	Maccabi Haifa	1–2	Bnei Yehuda	Haifa Municipal Stadium
	Baliti 5'		Mehalel 3'; Nahmias 13'	Attendance: 3000; Referee: Moshe Ashkenazi

4 May 1968	Hapoel Ra'anana	0–2	Hakoah Maccabi Ramat Gan
			Farkas 19'; Kadosh 74' (pen.)	Attendance: 1000; Referee: Orabi

4 May 1968	Hapoel Tel Aviv	0–1	Maccabi Sha'arayim	Bloomfield Stadium
			Akta 7'	Attendance: 500; Referee: Klein

=== Quarter-finals ===
25 May 1968

Maccabi Petah Tikva	4–1	Hakoah Maccabi Ramat Gan
Kinstlich 25', 42'; Hibasch 38'; Spokoiny 76'		Farkas 44'

Maccabi Petah Tikva ground
Attendance: 1000
Referee: Handwerg

25 May 1968

Maccabi Sha'arayim	1–1 (a.e.t.) 3–4 p.	Bnei Yehuda
Bzozak 82' (pen.)		Nahmias 43'

Hapoel Rehovot ground
Attendance: 1500
Referee: Avraham Fried

25 May 1968

Maccabi Netanya	1–0 (a.e.t.)	Shimshon Tel Aviv
Sarusi 100'

Maccabi Netanya Stadium
Attendance: 3000
Referee: Moshe Ashkenazi

25 May 1968

Hapoel Safed	0–1	Hapoel Petah Tikva
		Sharabi 50'

Hapoel Safed ground
Attendance: 4000
Referee: Klein

=== Semi-finals ===
29 May 1968

Hapoel Petah Tikva	2–1	Maccabi Netanya
Stelmach 24'; Sharabi 66'		Rubinstein 28'

Bloomfield Stadium, Tel Aviv
Attendance: 10000
Referee: Eitan

29 May 1968

Bnei Yehuda	1–1 (a.e.t.) 4–1 p.	Maccabi Petah Tikva
Nahmias 23'		Z. Seltzer 13' (pen.)

Bloomfield Stadium, Tel Aviv
Attendance: 15000
Referee: Moshe Mizrahi

=== Final ===
12 June 1968

Hapoel Petah Tikva	0–1	Bnei Yehuda
		Nahmias 26'

Bloomfield Stadium, Tel Aviv
Attendance: 20000
Referee: Klein
