= 1974–75 Israel State Cup =

Tournament details
- Country: Israel

Final positions
- Champions: Hapoel Kfar Saba
- Runners-up: Beitar Jerusalem

The 1974–75 Israel State Cup (Hebrew: גביע המדינה, Gvia HaMedina) was the 36th season of Israel's nationwide football cup competition and the 21st after the Israeli Declaration of Independence.

The competition was won by Hapoel Kfar Saba, who have beaten Beitar Jerusalem 3–1 at the final.

== Results ==
=== First round ===
| Home team | Score | Away team |
|---|---|---|
| Hapoel Kiryat Tiv'on | 5–0 | Beitar Tiberias |
| Hapoel Aliyah Kfar Saba | 3–0 | Beitar Bat Yam |
| Hapoel Kiryat Haim | 3–1 | Hapoel Givat Olga |
| Maccabi Tiberias | 2–3 | Hapoel Binyamina |
| Maccabi Yehud | 5–3 | Beitar Holon |
| Hapoel Nazareth Illit | 0–1 | Hapoel Givat Haim |
| Maccabi Be'er Sheva | 2–0 | Hapoel Shikun HaMizrah |
| Hapoel Hatzor | 1–5 | Hapoel Beit She'an |
| Maccabi HaSharon Netanya | 2–5 | Hapoel Mahane Yehuda |
| Maccabi Ramla | 0–1 | Maccabi Yavne |
| Hapoel Geva HaCarmel | 3–0 | Hapoel Beit Eliezer |
| Ahi Bnei Nazareth | 1–0 | Hapoel Majd al-Krum |
| Hapoel Kfar Ruppin | 1–2 | Hapoel Tel Hanan |
| Hapoel Kiryat Yam | 1–0 | Hapoel Ra'anana |
| Hapoel Tayibe | 1–5 | Maccabi Zikhron Ya'akov |
| Beitar Binyamina | 4–1 (a.e.t.) | Hapoel Migdal HaEmek |
| Beitar Kiryat Shmona | 2–5 | Maccabi Kiryat Bialik |
| Maccabi HaShikma Ramat Gan | 3–1 | Hapoel Kiryat Malakhi |
| Beitar Ramat Gan | 3–1 | Hapoel Merhavim |
| Hapoel Kiryat Ono | 5–2 | Hapoel Kiryat Gat |
| Hapoel Kfar Shalem | 1–0 | Hapoel Kafr Qasim |
| Beitar Lod | 2–0 | Beitar Ashkelon |
| Maccabi Jerusalem | 1–0 (a.e.t.) | Hapoel HaTzafon Tel Aviv |
| Maccabi Kiryat Gat | 2–1 | Hapoel Yeruham |
| Hapoel Ofakim | 0–1 | Hapoel Ashkelon |
| Beitar Herzliya | w/o | Beitar Ashdod |
| Hapoel Rosh HaAyin | w/o | Maccabi Holon |
| Hapoel Giv'atayim | w/o | Hapoel Or Yehuda |
| Maccabi Hatzor | w/o | Maccabi Pardes Hanna |
| Beitar Dov Netanya | w/o | Hapoel Afula |
| Beitar Nahariya | 1–3 (a.e.t.) | Hapoel Afikim |
| Hapoel Eilat | w/o | Beitar Be'er Sheva |

=== Second round ===
| Home team | Score | Away team |
|---|---|---|
| Hapoel Tiberias | 0–2 | Maccabi Zikhron Ya'akov |
| Hapoel Marmorek | 3–2 | Hapoel Yehud |
| Hapoel Ashdod | 0–1 | Hapoel Rishon LeZion |
| Hapoel Tel Hanan | 2–2 (a.e.t.) 3–4 p. | Hapoel Bnei Nazareth |
| Beitar Dov Netanya | 1–0 | Hapoel Kiryat Shmona |
| Hapoel Ramat Gan | 3–2 | Hapoel Givat Haim |
| Maccabi Hadera | 3–1 | Maccabi Kiryat Bialik |
| Beitar Netanya | 1–3 | Hapoel Nahliel |
| Hapoel Holon | 3–1 | Hapoel Ashkelon |
| Hapoel Kiryat Yam | 2–2 (a.e.t.) 3–4 p. | Hapoel Herzliya |
| Hapoel Beit Shemesh | 2–1 | Maccabi Kiryat Gat |
| Hapoel Kiryat Ono | 2–1 | Beitar Ramla |
| Maccabi Sha'arayim | 5–2 | Maccabi Yavne |
| Hapoel Rosh HaAyin | 0–1 | Hapoel Bat Yam |
| Hapoel Acre | 3–0 | Ahi Bnei Nazareth |
| Maccabi Hatzor | 1–11 | Hapoel Tirat HaCarmel |
| Hapoel Safed | 3–0 | Maccabi Herzliya |
| Hapoel Nahariya | 6–1 | Hapoel Binyamina |
| Maccabi Haifa | 1–1 (a.e.t.) 4–3 p. | Hapoel Netanya |
| SK Nes Tziona | 2–1 | Hapoel Be'er Ya'akov |
| Hapoel Kiryat Haim | 1–1 (a.e.t.) 4–2 p. | Hapoel Beit She'an |
| Hapoel Ramla | 1–0 | Beitar Jaffa |
| Maccabi HaShikma Ramat Gan | 3–2 | Hapoel Lod |
| Hapoel Giv'atayim | 1–0 | Maccabi Be'er Sheva |
| Maccabi Yehud | 2–3 | Beitar Herzliya |
| Maccabi Ramat Amidar | w/o | Hapoel Eilat |
| Hapoel Geva HaCarmel | 2–1 | Beitar Binyamina |
| Hapoel Mahane Yehuda | 3–1 | Hapoel Kiryat Ata |
| Beitar Lod | 2–0 | Beitar Ramat Gan |
| Hapoel Kfar Shalem | 0–1 | Hapoel Aliyah Kfar Saba |
| Maccabi Jerusalem | 0–5 | Hapoel Dimona |
| Hapoel Afikim | 4–2 (a.e.t.) | Hapoel Kiryat Tiv'on |

=== Third round ===
| Home team | Score | Away team |
|---|---|---|
| Hapoel Ramat Gan | 4–2 | Hapoel Tirat HaCarmel |
| Beitar Herzliya | 1–1 (a.e.t.) 0–3 p. | Hapoel Beit Shemesh |
| Hapoel Nahliel | 2–5 | Hapoel Mahane Yehuda |
| Beitar Dov Netanya | 2–1 | Hapoel Geva HaCarmel |
| Hapoel Holon | 1–0 | Hapoel Marmorek |
| Maccabi HaShikma Ramat Gan | 1–1 (a.e.t.) 4–3 p. | Hapoel Ramla |
| Hapoel Safed | 4–1 | Maccabi Zikhron Ya'akov |
| Hapoel Rishon LeZion | 4–0 | Hapoel Kiryat Ono |
| Hapoel Bat Yam | 2–1 (a.e.t.) | Hapoel Aliyah Kfar Saba |
| Hapoel Acre | 0–1 | Hapoel Bnei Nazareth |
| Beitar Lod | 0–4 | Maccabi Ramat Amidar |
| Hapoel Dimona | 2–1 | Hapoel Giv'atayim |
| Hapoel Nahariya | 2–1 (a.e.t.) | Maccabi Hadera |
| Hapoel Kiryat Haim | 3–1 | Hapoel Herzliya |
| Hapoel Afikim | 1–2 | Maccabi Haifa |
| SK Nes Tziona | 2–3 | Maccabi Sha'arayim |

=== Fourth round ===
| Home team | Score | Away team |
|---|---|---|
| Maccabi Tel Aviv | 0–3 | Hapoel Hadera |
| Maccabi Netanya | 3–0 | Bnei Yehuda |
| Hapoel Ramat Gan | 1–0 | Hakoah Maccabi Ramat Gan |
| Maccabi Ramat Amidar | 2–0 | Maccabi Petah Tikva |
| Maccabi Jaffa | 2–1 | Beitar Tel Aviv |
| Hapoel Tel Aviv | 9–1 | Hapoel Kiryat Haim |
| Hapoel Holon | 2–1 (a.e.t.) | Hapoel Dimona |
| Hapoel Nahariya | 0–2 | Hapoel Petah Tikva |
| Hapoel Bnei Nazareth | 4–1 | Hapoel Rishon LeZion |
| Hapoel Mahane Yehuda | 0–2 | Hapoel Be'er Sheva |
| Hapoel Kfar Saba | 1–0 | Hapoel Haifa |
| Beitar Jerusalem | 1–1 (a.e.t.) 3–2 p. | Shimshon Tel Aviv |
| Maccabi HaShikma Ramat Gan | 2–0 | Beitar Dov Netanya |
| Hapoel Bat Yam | 1–3 | Hapoel Jerusalem |
| Maccabi Haifa | 4–0 | Hapoel Safed |
| Hapoel Beit Shemesh | 1–0 | Maccabi Sha'arayim |

=== Round of 16 ===
| Team 1 | Agg. | Team 2 | 1st leg | 2nd leg |
|---|---|---|---|---|
| Beitar Jerusalem | 4–0 | Hapoel Beit Shemesh | 2–0 | 2–0 |
| Hapoel Petah Tikva | 1–1; 2–3 p. | Hapoel Jerusalem | 1–0 | 0–1 |
| Maccabi Jaffa | 3–2 | Maccabi HaShikma Ramat Gan | 0–0 | 3–2 (a.e.t.) |
| Hapoel Be'er Sheva | 1–2 | Hapoel Hadera | 1–0 | 0–2 |
| Hapoel Holon | 1–3 | Maccabi Haifa | 1–2 | 0–1 |
| Maccabi Netanya | 3–2 | Maccabi Ramat Amidar | 2–1 | 1–1 |
| Hapoel Bnei Nazareth | 1–5 | Hapoel Tel Aviv | 0–3 | 1–2 |
| Hapoel Ramat Gan | 3–7 | Hapoel Kfar Saba | 2–3 | 1–4 |

=== Quarter-finals ===
| Team 1 | Agg. | Team 2 | 1st leg | 2nd leg |
|---|---|---|---|---|
| Hapoel Kfar Saba | 3–3; 4–2 p. | Hapoel Jerusalem | 1–3 | 2–0 |
| Maccabi Jaffa | 1–3 | Beitar Jerusalem | 0–1 | 1–2 |
| Maccabi Netanya | 1–1; 3–4 p. | Hapoel Hadera | 1–1 | 0–0 |
| Maccabi Haifa | 1–2 | Hapoel Tel Aviv | 0–0 | 1–2 (a.e.t.) |

=== Semi-finals ===
| Home team | Score | Away team |
|---|---|---|
| Hapoel Kfar Saba | 0–0 (a.e.t.) 3–1 p. | Hapoel Tel Aviv |
| Beitar Jerusalem | 2–1 (a.e.t.) | Hapoel Hadera |

=== Final ===
14 May 1975

| Hapoel Kfar Saba | 3–1 | Beitar Jerusalem |
|---|---|---|
| Mor 14', 84'; Shum 87' | | Shriki 80' |

Bloomfield Stadium, Tel Aviv
Attendance: 18000
Referee: Ashkenazi
