= 1968–69 Liga Bet =

Israeli football season

The 1968–69 Liga Bet season saw Beitar Kiryat Tiv'on, Hapoel Tirat HaCarmel, Hapoel Bat Yam and Hapoel Eilat win their regional divisions and promoted to Liga Alef.

== North Division A ==
Pos	Team	Pld	W	D	L	GF	GA	GD	Pts	Promotion or relegation
1	Beitar Kiryat Tiv'on	30	–	–	–	79	23	+56	49	Promoted to Liga Alef
2	Beitar Kiryat Shmona	30	–	–	–	90	26	+64	48	
3	Hapoel Safed	30	–	–	–	106	29	+77	44	
4	Hapoel Migdal HaEmek	30	–	–	–	63	41	+22	41	
5	Hapoel Nahariya	30	–	–	–	67	61	+6	30	
6	Hapoel Ramat David	30	–	–	–	64	63	+1	27	
7	Hapoel Kiryat Ata	30	–	–	–	31	51	−20	27	
8	Hapoel Shefa-'Amr	30	–	–	–	48	49	−1	26	
9	Hapoel Kiryat Yam	30	–	–	–	53	76	−23	24	
10	Hapoel Tel Hanan	30	–	–	–	35	61	−26	24	
11	Hapoel Afikim	30	–	–	–	42	56	−14	23	
12	Hapoel Sde Nahum	30	–	–	–	28	48	−20	23	
13	Beitar Tiberias	30	–	–	–	53	87	−34	23	
14	Hapoel Afula	30	–	–	–	47	63	−16	22	
15	Beitar Acre	30	–	–	–	43	64	−21	22	Relegated to Liga Gimel
16	Hapoel Beit She'an	30	–	–	–	37	79	−42	18	Relegated to Liga Gimel

== North Division B ==
Pos	Team	Pld	W	D	L	GF	GA	GD	Pts	Promotion or relegation
1	Hapoel Tirat HaCarmel	28	–	–	–	77	32	+45	42	Promoted to Liga Alef
2	Hapoel Zikhron Ya'akov	28	–	–	–	70	42	+28	41	
3	Hapoel Givat Haim	28	–	–	–	72	42	+30	38	
4	Hapoel Ya'akov Tel Mond (Note: Hapoel Ya'akov Kfar Saba merged with Liga Gimel club, Hapoel Tel Mond, to form Hapoel Ya'akov Tel Mond.)	28	–	–	–	67	64	+3	32	
5	Maccabi Pardes Hanna	28	–	–	–	55	47	+8	28	
6	Hapoel Beit Eliezer	28	–	–	–	36	32	+4	28	
7	Maccabi Zikhron Ya'akov	28	–	–	–	48	49	−1	27	
8	Beitar Tirat HaCarmel	28	–	–	–	41	59	−18	27	
9	Maccabi Neve Sha'anan	28	–	–	–	58	58	0	26	
10	Beitar Dov Netanya	28	–	–	–	42	52	−10	26	
11	Hapoel Givat Olga	28	–	–	–	39	39	0	23	
12	M.S. Even Yehuda	28	–	–	–	61	73	−12	22	
13	Hapoel Atlit	28	–	–	–	43	59	−16	22	
14	Hapoel Binyamina	28	–	–	–	35	55	−20	21	
15	Beitar Petah Tikva\Mahane Yehuda (Note: Beitar Petah Tikva merged with Liga Gimel club, Beitar Mahane Yehuda, to form Beitar Petah Tikva\Mahane Yehuda)	28	–	–	–	37	74	−37	14	Relegated to Liga Gimel

Notes:

Hapoel Shefayim folded during the season.

== South Division A ==
Pos	Team	Pld	W	D	L	GF	GA	GD	Pts	Promotion or relegation
1	Hapoel Bat Yam	30	–	–	–	100	29	+71	54	Promoted to Liga Alef
2	Hapoel Kfar Shalem	30	–	–	–	63	40	+23	38	
3	Beitar Holon	30	–	–	–	62	50	+12	35	
4	Beitar Ramat Gan	30	–	–	–	55	50	+5	35	
5	Maccabi HaShikma Ramat Gan (Note: Maccabi Ramat Gan merged with Liga Gimel club, Maccabi Ramat Hashikma, to form Maccabi HaShikma Ramat Gan.)	30	–	–	–	50	46	+4	33	
6	Hapoel HaTzafon Tel Aviv	30	–	–	–	65	56	+9	32	
7	Maccabi Bat Yam	30	–	–	–	46	45	+1	29	
8	Hapoel Rosh HaAyin	30	–	–	–	61	62	−1	29	
9	Hapoel David Kiryat Shalom (Note: David Tel Aviv merged with Liga Gimel club, Hapoel Kiryat Shalom, to form Hapoel David Kiryat Shalom.)	30	–	–	–	70	72	−2	29	
10	Hapoel Shikun HaMizrah	30	–	–	–	45	48	−3	29	
11	Maccabi Shmuel Tel Aviv	30	–	–	–	43	49	−6	28	
12	Hapoel Ramat HaSharon	30	–	–	–	43	43	0	27	
13	Hapoel Ganei Tikva	30	–	–	–	37	41	−4	27	
14	Hapoel Or Yehuda	30	–	–	–	50	63	−13	27	
15	Beitar Harari Bat Yam	30	–	–	–	59	67	−8	26	Relegated to Liga Gimel
16	Beitar Kiryat Ono	30	–	–	–	12	100	−88	1	Relegated to Liga Gimel

== South Division B ==
Pos	Team	Pld	W	D	L	GF	GA	GD	Pts	Promotion or relegation
1	Hapoel Eilat	30	–	–	–	70	28	+42	48	Promoted to Liga Alef
2	Beitar Rehovot	30	–	–	–	72	34	+38	47	
3	Hapoel Ashdod	30	–	–	–	70	36	+34	44	
4	Maccabi Rehovot	30	–	–	–	71	60	+11	36	
5	Hapoel Beit Shemesh	29	–	–	–	61	42	+19	34	
6	Maccabi Ramla	30	–	–	–	52	38	+14	31	
7	Maccabi Be'er Sheva	30	–	–	–	66	53	+13	28	
8	Hapoel Dimona	30	–	–	–	40	48	−8	28	
9	Hapoel Kiryat Malakhi	30	–	–	–	43	67	−24	28	
10	Hapoel Ramla	30	–	–	–	42	62	−20	27	
11	HaBira Jerusalem	30	–	–	–	42	51	−9	24	
12	Hapoel Kiryat Gat Rehovot (Note: Hapoel Rehovot merged with Liga Alef club, Hapoel Marmorek, and went to compete in Liga Alef under the name of Hapoel Marmorek-Rehovot. However, for the Liga Bet spot, Hapoel Rehovot merged with Liga Gimel club, Hapoel Kiryat Gat, and for the 1968-69 season, the club named Hapoel Kiryat Gat-Rehovot.)	30	–	–	–	51	63	−12	24	
13	Maccabi Dror Lod	30	–	–	–	45	57	−12	24	
14	Hapoel Ofakim	29	–	–	–	46	56	−10	22	
15	Hapoel Bnei Zion	30	–	–	–	43	66	−23	22	Relegated to Liga Gimel
16	Hapoel Be'eri	30	–	–	–	45	96	−51	10	Relegated to Liga Gimel
