= 1970–71 Liga Bet =

Israeli football season

The 1970–71 Liga Bet season saw Hapoel Migdal HaEmek, Hapoel Kiryat Haim, Maccabi Bat Yam and Hapoel Ashdod win their regional divisions and promoted to Liga Alef.

== North Division A ==
Pos	Team	Pld	W	D	L	GF	GA	GD	Pts	Promotion or relegation
1	Hapoel Migdal HaEmek	30	–	–	–	94	37	+57	51	Promoted to Liga Alef
2	Hapoel Afikim	30	–	–	–	82	38	+44	44	
3	Hapoel Kiryat Ata	30	–	–	–	71	28	+43	41	
4	Beitar Tiberias	30	–	–	–	69	53	+16	36	
5	Hapoel Safed	30	–	–	–	62	45	+17	32	
6	Hapoel Hatzor	30	–	–	–	44	39	+5	30	
7	Hapoel Tel Hanan	30	–	–	–	44	46	−2	29	
8	Hapoel Sde Nahum\Beit She'an	30	–	–	–	56	72	−16	28	
9	Beitar Tel Hanan	30	–	–	–	43	55	−12	27	
10	Hapoel Kiryat Yam	30	–	–	–	50	70	−20	26	
11	Beitar Kiryat Shmona	30	–	–	–	47	39	+8	25	
12	Beitar Acre	30	–	–	–	48	60	−12	25	
13	Beitar Migdal HaEmek	30	–	–	–	38	64	−26	25	
14	Beitar Nahariya	30	–	–	–	38	55	−17	23	
15	Beitar Kiryat Tiv'on	30	–	–	–	31	49	−18	23	Relegated to Liga Gimel
16	Hapoel Shefa-'Amr	30	–	–	–	16	83	−67	7	Relegated to Liga Gimel

== North Division B ==
Pos	Team	Pld	W	D	L	GF	GA	GD	Pts	Promotion or relegation
1	Hapoel Kiryat Haim	28	–	–	–	77	23	+54	46	Promoted to Liga Alef
2	Hapoel Ra'anana	28	–	–	–	58	25	+33	39	
3	Hapoel Afula	28	–	–	–	43	30	+13	33	
4	Maccabi Zikhron Ya'akov	28	–	–	–	65	55	+10	30	
5	Hapoel Givat Olga	28	–	–	–	43	37	+6	30	
6	Hapoel Givat Haim	28	–	–	–	59	57	+2	28	
7	Maccabi HaSharon Netanya	28	–	–	–	48	48	0	26	
8	Hapoel Tel Mond	28	–	–	–	59	63	−4	25	
9	Hapoel Beit Eliezer	28	–	–	–	33	39	−6	25	
10	Beitar Binyamina	28	–	–	–	32	41	−9	25	
11	Maccabi Pardes Hanna	28	–	–	–	38	59	−21	25	
12	M.S. Even Yehuda	28	–	–	–	37	60	−23	23	
13	Hapoel Binyamina	28	–	–	–	42	66	−24	23	
14	Beitar Dov Netanya	28	–	–	–	36	52	−16	22	
15	Hapoel Caesarea	28	–	–	–	37	52	−15	21	Relegated to Liga Gimel

Beitar Tirat HaCarmel withdrew from the league.

== South Division A ==
Pos	Team	Pld	W	D	L	GF	GA	GD	Pts	Promotion or relegation
1	Maccabi Bat Yam	30	–	–	–	75	11	+64	52	Promoted to Liga Alef
2	Hapoel Ramla	30	–	–	–	81	21	+60	49	
3	Hapoel Kfar Shalem	30	–	–	–	51	35	+16	32	
4	Hapoel Or Yehuda	30	–	–	–	72	51	+21	31	
5	Hapoel Ganei Tikva	30	–	–	–	36	56	−20	30	
6	Maccabi HaShikma Ramat Gan	30	–	–	–	30	34	−4	29	
7	Hapoel Rosh HaAyin	30	–	–	–	35	41	−6	28	
8	Hapoel Ramat HaSharon	29	–	–	–	35	40	−5	27	
9	Hapoel Giv'at Shmuel	30	–	–	–	36	45	−9	27	
10	Beitar Ramat Gan	30	–	–	–	31	41	−10	27	
11	Maccabi Holon	29	–	–	–	35	47	−12	27	
12	Beitar Holon	30	–	–	–	37	36	+1	26	
13	Hapoel HaTzafon Tel Aviv	30	–	–	–	43	52	−9	25	
14	Beitar Bat Yam	30	–	–	–	38	51	−13	23	
15	Hapoel Shikun HaMizrah	30	–	–	–	29	54	−25	23	Relegated to Liga Gimel
16	Hapoel Kiryat Shalom	30	–	–	–	34	87	−53	11	Relegated to Liga Gimel

== South Division B ==
Pos	Team	Pld	W	D	L	GF	GA	GD	Pts	Promotion or relegation
1	Hapoel Ashdod	30	–	–	–	69	16	+53	50	Promoted to Liga Alef
2	Hapoel Dimona	30	–	–	–	47	14	+33	45	
3	Beitar Be'er Sheva	30	–	–	–	72	37	+35	42	
4	Maccabi Be'er Sheva	30	–	–	–	64	40	+24	37	
5	Hapoel Kiryat Malakhi	30	–	–	–	45	35	+10	36	
6	Beitar Ashkelon	30	–	–	–	60	47	+13	32	
7	Hapoel Ofakim	30	–	–	–	39	30	+9	31	
8	Maccabi Kiryat Gat\Kfar Gvirol (Note: Maccabi Kfar Gvirol merged with Maccabi Kiryat Gat.)	30	–	–	–	56	57	−1	26	
9	HaBira Jerusalem	30	–	–	–	35	40	−5	25	
10	Maccabi Ashkelon	30	–	–	–	44	47	−3	24	
11	Maccabi Rehovot	30	–	–	–	46	65	−19	24	
12	Hapoel Ginaton	30	–	–	–	44	67	−23	23	
13	Beitar Ashdod (Note: Beitar Rehovot merged with Beitar Ashdod and the club continued as Beitar Ashdod.)	30	–	–	–	31	58	−27	22	
14	Hapoel Sderot	30	–	–	–	44	94	−50	20	
15	Hapoel Merhavim	30	–	–	–	30	48	−18	18	Relegated to Liga Gimel
16	Maccabi Ramla	30	–	–	–	36	67	−31	17	Relegated to Liga Gimel
