= 1974 Israel Super Cup =

Maccabi Netanya	Hapoel Haifa
2	1
- Date: 21 September 1974
- Venue: Kiryat Haim Stadium, Haifa
- Referee: Moshe Ashkenazi
- Attendance: 6,000

The 1974 Israel Super Cup was the fourth Israel Super Cup (ninth, including unofficial matches, as the competition wasn't played within the Israel Football Association in its first 5 editions, until 1969), an annual Israel football match played between the winners of the previous season's Top Division and Israel State Cup. With this match, the competitions resumed after two years of absence.

The match was played between Maccabi Netanya, champions of the 1973–74 Liga Leumit and Hapoel Haifa, winners of the 1973–74 Israel State Cup.

For both teams, this was their second appearance in the competition. At the match, played at Kiryat Haim Stadium, Maccabi Netanya won 2–1.

== Match details ==
21 September 1974

Maccabi Netanya	2–1	Hapoel Haifa
Machnes 4'; Sarusi 49'		Baliti 73'

Kiryat Haim Stadium, Haifa
Attendance: 6,000
Referee: Moshe Ashkenazi

Maccabi Netanya	Hapoel Haifa

GK	(Israel) Michael Sheinfeld
RB	(Israel) Zohar Solomon
CB	(Israel) Shraga Bar
CB	(Israel) Haim Bar
LB	Israel Hajaj
CM	(Israel) Efraim Amira
CM	(Israel) Moshe Shlomovich	Substituted off
CM	(Israel) Albert Gazal
FW	(Israel) Oded Machnes
FW	(Israel) Zvi Sheinfeld	Substituted off
FW	(Israel) Victor Sarusi
Substitutes:
MF	(Israel) Gideon Kleinman	Substituted in
FW	(Israel) David Lavi	Substituted in
Manager:
(Israel) Eliezer Spiegel

GK	(Israel) Eliyahu Benish
RB	(Israel) Abba Gindin
DF	(Israel) Aharon Cohen
DF	(Israel) Yochanan Vollach
LB	(Israel) Leon Gross
CM	(Israel) Yossi Lifshitz
CM	(Israel) Eli Levental
CM	(Israel) Itzhak Englander
FW	(Israel) Itzhak Inchi	Substituted off
FW	(Israel) Benny Alon
FW	(Israel) Dov Bendet	Substituted off
Substitutes:
FW	(Israel) Timur Chuchushvili	Substituted in
FW	(Israel) Gabi Baliti	Substituted in
Manager:
(Israel) Ya'akov Grundman
