= 1964–65 Liga Bet =

Israeli football season

The 1964–65 Liga Bet season saw Hapoel Kiryat Shmona, Beitar Kiryat Ono, Hapoel Kfar Shalem and Hapoel Rishon LeZion win their regional divisions and promoted to Liga Alef.

== North Division A ==
Pos	Team	Pld	W	D	L	GF	GA	GD	Pts	Promotion or relegation
1	Hapoel Kiryat Shmona	30	–	–	–	88	21	+67	52	Promoted to Liga Alef
2	Hapoel Nahariya	30	–	–	–	66	27	+39	46	
3	Hapoel Kfar Ata	30	–	–	–	70	37	+33	38	
4	Hapoel Afula	30	–	–	–	52	33	+19	38	
5	Beitar Nahariya	30	–	–	–	60	45	+15	33	
6	A.S. Kiryat Bialik	30	–	–	–	44	43	+1	33	
7	Beitar Kiryat Shmona	30	–	–	–	35	43	−8	31	
8	Hapoel HaMechonit Tel Hanan	30	–	–	–	43	40	+3	28	
9	Hapoel Afikim	30	–	–	–	41	55	−14	26	
10	Hapoel Migdal HaEmek	30	–	–	–	32	53	−21	25	
11	Hapoel Ramat David	30	–	–	–	46	58	−12	23	
12	Hapoel Yagur	30	–	–	–	46	63	−17	23	
13	Hapoel Tirat HaCarmel	30	–	–	–	36	58	−22	23	
14	Beitar Kiryat Tiv'on	30	–	–	–	40	62	−22	22	
15	Shefa-'Amr Club	30	–	–	–	34	68	−34	20	Relegated to Liga Gimel
16	Hapoel Hulata	30	–	–	–	39	66	−27	19	Relegated to Liga Gimel

== North Division B ==
Pos	Team	Pld	W	D	L	GF	GA	GD	Pts	Promotion or relegation
1	Beitar Kiryat Ono	28	–	–	–	84	27	+57	46	Promoted to Liga Alef
2	Hapoel Givat Haim	28	–	–	–	75	34	+41	43	
3	M.S. Even Yehuda	28	–	–	–	76	24	+52	42	
4	Hapoel Ya'akov Kfar Saba	28	–	–	–	61	42	+19	34	
5	Hapoel Shefayim	28	–	–	–	65	37	+28	33	
6	Hapoel Givat Olga	28	–	–	–	59	45	+14	31	
7	Maccabi Herzliya	28	–	–	–	41	36	+5	29	
8	Maccabi Neve Shalom	28	–	–	–	53	48	+5	26	
9	Hapoel Beit Eliezer	28	–	–	–	47	63	−16	24	
10	Maccabi Pardes Hanna	28	–	–	–	41	58	−17	21	
11	Beitar Dov Vatikim Netanya (Note: Beitar Dov Vatikim Netanya was previously known as Beitar Beit Lid.)	28	–	–	–	48	58	−10	20	
12	Hapoel Pardesiya	28	–	–	–	46	68	−22	19	
13	Beitar Petah Tikva	28	–	–	–	45	81	−36	18	
14	Hapoel Dora Netanya	28	–	–	–	33	38	−5	16	
15	Hapoel Atlit	28	–	–	–	45	115	−70	14	Relegated to Liga Gimel

Notes:

Hapoel Pardes Hanna withdrew from the league.

== South Division A ==
Pos	Team	Pld	W	D	L	GF	GA	GD	Pts	Promotion or relegation
1	Hapoel Kfar Shalem	30	–	–	–	74	21	+53	47	Promoted to Liga Alef
2	Maccabi Bat Yam	30	–	–	–	63	18	+45	46	
3	Maccabi Shmuel Tel Aviv	30	–	–	–	53	40	+13	35	
4	Hapoel Be'er Ya'akov	30	–	–	–	49	45	+4	35	
5	Hapoel Bat Yam	30	–	–	–	41	35	+6	33	
6	Hapoel HaTzafon Tel Aviv	30	–	–	–	41	40	+1	32	
7	Beitar Ezra	30	–	–	–	52	55	−3	31	
8	Hapoel Ganei Tikva	30	–	–	–	51	46	+5	29	
9	Hapoel Shikun HaMizrah	30	–	–	–	48	60	−12	28	
10	Hapoel Yehud	30	–	–	–	52	48	+4	27	
11	Hapoel Azor	30	–	–	–	37	64	−27	25	
12	Hapoel Or Yehuda	30	–	–	–	40	50	−10	24	
13	Maccabi Ramat Gan	30	–	–	–	40	52	−12	24	
14	Beitar Ramat Gan	30	–	–	–	47	75	−28	24	
15	Hapoel Kiryat Shalom	30	–	–	–	55	56	−1	23	Relegated to Liga Gimel
16	ASA Jerusalem	30	–	–	–	36	74	−38	16	Relegated to Liga Gimel

== South Division B ==
Pos	Team	Pld	W	D	L	GF	GA	GD	Pts	Promotion or relegation
1	Hapoel Rishon LeZion	30	–	–	–	66	24	+42	48	Promoted to Liga Alef
2	Maccabi Rehovot	30	–	–	–	73	23	+50	44	
3	Hapoel Avraham Be'er Sheva	30	–	–	–	58	31	+27	41	
4	Beitar Be'er Sheva	30	–	–	–	57	43	+14	36	
5	Hapoel Bnei Zion	29	–	–	–	49	35	+14	36	
6	Hapoel Kiryat Malakhi	30	–	–	–	57	42	+15	33	
7	Hapoel Sderot	30	–	–	–	57	50	+7	31	
8	Hapoel Eilat	30	–	–	–	61	61	0	30	
9	Hapoel Ashdod	29	–	–	–	59	60	−1	29	
10	Hapoel Dorot Sha'ar HaNegev	30	–	–	–	72	59	+13	24	
11	Hapoel Ofakim	30	–	–	–	53	55	−2	24	
12	Hapoel Rehovot	30	–	–	–	50	70	−20	24	
13	Beitar Ekron	30	–	–	–	38	77	−39	21	
14	Beitar Rehovot	30	–	–	–	32	56	−24	20	
15	Hapoel Be'eri	30	–	–	–	47	86	−39	16	Relegated to Liga Gimel
16	Hapoel Merhavim	30	–	–	–	29	84	−55	14	Relegated to Liga Gimel
