= 1963–64 Liga Gimel =

Israeli football season

The 1963–64 Liga Gimel season saw 155 clubs competing in 16 regional divisions for promotion to Liga Bet.

Hapoel Hulata, Hapoel Beit Eliezer, Beitar Beit Lid, Hapoel Shefayim, Beitar Petah Tikva, Beitar Ramat Gan, Beitar Rehovot, ASA Jerusalem, Hapoel Kiryat Malakhi and Hapoel Be'eri won their regional divisions and promoted to Liga Bet.

Promotion play-offs, held in neutral venues, were contested between six other regional division winners and saw Beitar Kiryat Tiv'on, Hapoel Yagur and Hapoel Ashdod win over Hapoel Beit She'an, Al-Amal Acre and Hapoel Dimona

15 clubs did not finish the season due to suspensions and withdrawals, which were: Hapoel Kfar Baruch, Hapoel Neve Eitan, Hapoel Givat Oz, Hapoel Ma'alot, Hapoel Shlomi, Hapoel Matzuva, Hapoel Kadima, Hapoel HaKochav Or Yehuda, Hapoel Zarnuga, Hapoel Mishmar HaSharon, Hapoel Nir Yitzhak, Maccabi Jerusalem, Maccabi Kfar Ata, Beitar Mahane Israel and Beitar Ramat HaSharon.

== Upper Galilee Division ==
| Pos | Team | Pld | W | D | L | GF | GA | GD | Pts | Promotion |
|---|---|---|---|---|---|---|---|---|---|---|
| 1 | Hapoel Hulata | 16 | – | – | – | 44 | 20 | +24 | 25 | Promoted to Liga Bet |
| 2 | Hapoel Hatzor | 16 | – | – | – | 39 | 11 | +28 | 24 | |
| 3 | Hapoel Dan | 16 | – | – | – | 43 | 32 | +11 | 20 | |
| 4 | Hapoel Ayelet HaShahar | 16 | – | – | – | 51 | 16 | +35 | 19 | |
| 5 | Beitar Tiberias | 16 | – | – | – | 41 | 28 | +13 | 19 | |
| 6 | Hapoel Kfar Giladi | 16 | – | – | – | 39 | 38 | +1 | 16 | |
| 7 | Hapoel HaMusach Kiryat Shmona | 16 | – | – | – | 19 | 54 | −35 | 8 | |
| 8 | Nevatim Safed | 16 | – | – | – | 17 | 55 | −38 | 5 | |
| 9 | Hapoel Bnei HaGalil | 16 | – | – | – | 19 | 58 | −39 | 4 | |

== North Division ==
| Pos | Team | Pld | W | D | L | GF | GA | GD | Pts | Qualification |
|---|---|---|---|---|---|---|---|---|---|---|
| 1 | Al-Amal Acre | 16 | – | – | – | 57 | 3 | +54 | 30 | Promotion play-offs |
| 2 | Hapoel Ein HaMifratz | 16 | – | – | – | 49 | 16 | +33 | 22 | |
| 3 | Hapoel Kafr Yasif | 16 | – | – | – | 42 | 19 | +23 | 22 | |
| 4 | Hapoel Tarshiha | 16 | – | – | – | 32 | 21 | +11 | 21 | |
| 5 | Al Ahly Majd al-Krum | 16 | – | – | – | 30 | 23 | +7 | 19 | |
| 6 | Maccabi Mi'ilya | 16 | – | – | – | 25 | 30 | −5 | 13 | |
| 7 | Hapoel Mi'ilya | 16 | – | – | – | 9 | 41 | −32 | 7 (Note: Two points deducted) | |
| 8 | Hapoel Majd al-Krum | 16 | – | – | – | 9 | 57 | −48 | 2 | |
| 9 | Hapoel Ma'alot | 16 | – | – | – | 4 | 47 | −43 | 2 | |

== Valleys A Division ==
| Pos | Team | Pld | W | D | L | GF | GA | GD | Pts | Qualification |
|---|---|---|---|---|---|---|---|---|---|---|
| 1 | Hapoel Beit She'an | 16 | – | – | – | 53 | 11 | +42 | 29 | Promotion play-offs |
| 2 | Hapoel Sde Nahum | 16 | – | – | – | 50 | 12 | +38 | 26 | |
| 3 | Hapoel Sharona\Kfar Kama | 16 | – | – | – | 39 | 26 | +13 | 23 | |
| 4 | Hapoel Yardena | 16 | – | – | – | 28 | 28 | 0 | 16 | |
| 5 | Maccabi Beit She'an | 16 | – | – | – | 24 | 27 | −3 | 16 | |
| 6 | Hapoel Tel Yosef | 16 | – | – | – | 24 | 35 | −11 | 13 | |
| 7 | Beitar Beit She'an | 16 | – | – | – | 26 | 43 | −17 | 10 | |
| 8 | Hapoel Kfar Baruch | 16 | – | – | – | 13 | 45 | −32 | 6 | |
| 9 | Hapoel Neve Eitan | 16 | – | – | – | 9 | 39 | −30 | 5 | |

== Valleys B Division ==
| Pos | Team | Pld | W | D | L | GF | GA | GD | Pts | Qualification |
|---|---|---|---|---|---|---|---|---|---|---|
| 1 | Beitar Kiryat Tiv'on | 16 | – | – | – | 65 | 12 | +53 | 29 | Promotion play-offs |
| 2 | Maccabi Afula | 16 | – | – | – | 51 | 24 | +27 | 23 | |
| 3 | Hapoel Yokneam | 16 | – | – | – | 43 | 25 | +18 | 21 | |
| 4 | Hapoel Kiryat Tiv'on | 16 | – | – | – | 35 | 21 | +14 | 18 | |
| 5 | Beitar Afula | 16 | – | – | – | 27 | 35 | −8 | 15 | |
| 6 | Yedidut Nazareth | 16 | – | – | – | 27 | 39 | −12 | 15 | |
| 7 | Hapoel Kiryat Nazareth | 16 | – | – | – | 22 | 38 | −16 | 10 | |
| 8 | Hapoel Balfouria | 16 | – | – | – | 15 | 32 | −17 | 9 | |
| 9 | Hapoel Givat Oz | 16 | – | – | – | 7 | 66 | −59 | 2 | |

== Haifa Division ==
| Pos | Team | Pld | W | D | L | GF | GA | GD | Pts | Qualification |
|---|---|---|---|---|---|---|---|---|---|---|
| 1 | Hapoel Yagur | 14 | – | – | – | 58 | 8 | +50 | 25 | Promotion play-offs |
| 2 | Maccabi Kiryat Yam | 14 | – | – | – | 40 | 13 | +27 | 21 | |
| 3 | Beitar Tel Hanan | 14 | – | – | – | 23 | 10 | +13 | 18 | |
| 4 | Beitar Tirat HaCarmel | 14 | – | – | – | 42 | 20 | +22 | 16 (Note: Three points deducted) | |
| 5 | Maccabi Tel Hanan | 14 | – | – | – | 26 | 22 | +4 | 14 | |
| 6 | Maccabi Kfar Ata | 14 | – | – | – | 20 | 47 | −27 | 6 | |
| 7 | Beitar Shprintzak | 14 | – | – | – | 14 | 35 | −21 | 6 | |
| 8 | Beitar Rekhasim | 14 | – | – | – | 6 | 74 | −68 | 3 | |

== Carmel Division ==
| Pos | Team | Pld | W | D | L | GF | GA | GD | Pts | Promotion |
|---|---|---|---|---|---|---|---|---|---|---|
| 1 | Hapoel Beit Eliezer | 18 | – | – | – | 68 | 14 | +54 | 33 | Promoted to Liga Bet |
| 2 | Hapoel Geva HaCarmel | 18 | – | – | – | 57 | 31 | +26 | 25 | |
| 3 | Hapoel Or Akiva | 18 | – | – | – | 47 | 29 | +18 | 25 | |
| 4 | Beitar Hadera | 18 | – | – | – | 39 | 31 | +8 | 22 | |
| 5 | Hapoel Zikhron Ya'akov | 18 | – | – | – | 38 | 40 | −2 | 17 | |
| 6 | Hapoel Binyamina | 18 | – | – | – | 29 | 39 | −10 | 17 | |
| 7 | Maccabi Fureidis | 18 | – | – | – | 34 | 36 | −2 | 16 | |
| 8 | Beitar Zikhron Ya'akov | 18 | – | – | – | 23 | 45 | −22 | 11 | |
| 9 | Beitar Atlit | 18 | – | – | – | 23 | 52 | −29 | 6 | |
| 10 | Hapoel Karkur | 18 | – | – | – | 31 | 72 | −41 | 6 | |

== Samaria Division ==
| Pos | Team | Pld | W | D | L | GF | GA | GD | Pts | Promotion |
|---|---|---|---|---|---|---|---|---|---|---|
| 1 | Beitar Beit Lid | 24 | – | – | – | 77 | 24 | +53 | 39 | Promoted to Liga Bet |
| 2 | Hapoel Tel Mond | 24 | – | – | – | 77 | 29 | +48 | 39 | |
| 3 | Hapoel Beit Yitzhak | 24 | – | – | – | 94 | 28 | +66 | 37 | |
| 4 | Hapoel HaSharon HaTzfoni | 24 | – | – | – | 75 | 31 | +44 | 37 | |
| 5 | Beitar Zvi Netanya | 24 | – | – | – | 66 | 39 | +27 | 33 | |
| 6 | Hapoel Kfar Yona | 24 | – | – | – | 46 | 52 | −6 | 26 (Note: Two points deducted) | |
| 7 | F.C. Ein Ya'akov | 24 | – | – | – | 37 | 60 | −23 | 18 | |
| 8 | Maccabi Beit Lid | 24 | – | – | – | 31 | 57 | −26 | 14 (Note: Four points deducted) | |
| 9 | Hapoel Burgata | 24 | – | – | – | 28 | 58 | −30 | 14 | |
| 10 | Maccabi Amidar Netanya | 24 | – | – | – | 35 | 58 | −23 | 13 | |
| 11 | Hapoel Yanuv | 24 | – | – | – | 31 | 57 | −26 | 13 | |
| 12 | Hapoel Tnuvot | 24 | – | – | – | 37 | 82 | −45 | 13 | |
| 13 | Hapoel Kadima | 24 | – | – | – | 14 | 73 | −59 | 6 | |

== Sharon Division ==
| Pos | Team | Pld | W | D | L | GF | GA | GD | Pts | Promotion |
|---|---|---|---|---|---|---|---|---|---|---|
| 1 | Hapoel Shefayim | 16 | – | – | – | 76 | 6 | +70 | 30 | Promoted to Liga Bet |
| 2 | Hapoel Ramat HaSharon | 16 | – | – | – | 62 | 8 | +54 | 29 | |
| 3 | Beitar Magdiel | 16 | – | – | – | 35 | 28 | +7 | 19 | |
| 4 | Hapoel Nof Yam | 16 | – | – | – | 24 | 29 | −5 | 16 | |
| 5 | Maccabi Sheikh Munis | 16 | – | – | – | 33 | 35 | −2 | 15 | |
| 6 | Beitar Herzliya | 16 | – | – | – | 23 | 40 | −17 | 11 | |
| 7 | Beitar Kfar Saba | 16 | – | – | – | 23 | 57 | −34 | 11 | |
| 8 | Maccabi Ever HaYarkon | 16 | – | – | – | 16 | 54 | −38 | 9 | |
| 9 | Beitar Ramat HaSharon | 16 | – | – | – | 10 | 50 | −40 | 4 | |

== Petah Tikva Division ==
| Pos | Team | Pld | W | D | L | GF | GA | GD | Pts | Promotion |
|---|---|---|---|---|---|---|---|---|---|---|
| 1 | Beitar Petah Tikva | 22 | – | – | – | 69 | 15 | +54 | 38 | Promoted to Liga Bet |
| 2 | Hapoel Sha'ariya | 22 | – | – | – | 79 | 8 | +71 | 37 | |
| 3 | Hapoel Rosh HaAyin | 22 | – | – | – | 84 | 10 | +74 | 37 | |
| 4 | Hapoel Tira | 22 | – | – | – | 45 | 22 | +23 | 27 | |
| 5 | Hapoel Kafr Qasim | 22 | – | – | – | 40 | 43 | −3 | 24 | |
| 6 | Beitar Ganei Tikva | 22 | – | – | – | 51 | 38 | +13 | 23 | |
| 7 | Beitar Rosh HaAyin | 22 | – | – | – | 45 | 37 | +8 | 23 | |
| 8 | Hapoel Jaljulia | 22 | – | – | – | 31 | 42 | −11 | 17 | |
| 9 | Shimshon Rosh HaAyin | 22 | – | – | – | 26 | 55 | −29 | 15 | |
| 10 | Maccabi Rosh HaAyin | 22 | – | – | – | 25 | 52 | −27 | 8 (Note: Two points deducted) | |
| 11 | Hapoel Tayibe | 22 | – | – | – | 18 | 69 | −51 | 6 | |
| 12 | Maccabi Sha'ariya | 22 | – | – | – | 6 | 128 | −122 | 3 | |

== Tel Aviv Division ==
| Pos | Team | Pld | W | D | L | GF | GA | GD | Pts | Promotion |
|---|---|---|---|---|---|---|---|---|---|---|
| 1 | Beitar Ramat Gan | 14 | – | – | – | 61 | 9 | +52 | 25 | Promoted to Liga Bet |
| 2 | Beitar Bat Yam | 14 | – | – | – | 38 | 10 | +28 | 22 | |
| 3 | Hapoel Ezra | 14 | – | – | – | 32 | 11 | +21 | 20 | |
| 4 | David Tel Aviv | 14 | – | – | – | 41 | 14 | +27 | 19 | |
| 5 | Beitar Yehud | 14 | – | – | – | 16 | 29 | −13 | 9 | |
| 6 | Maccabi Ramat Hen | 14 | – | – | – | 17 | 31 | −14 | 6 (Note: Two points deducted) | |
| 7 | Beitar HaTzafon Tel Aviv | 14 | – | – | – | 15 | 67 | −52 | 5 | |
| 8 | Beitar Jaffa | 14 | – | – | – | 15 | 64 | −49 | 4 | |

== Central Division ==
| Pos | Team | Pld | W | D | L | GF | GA | GD | Pts | Promotion |
|---|---|---|---|---|---|---|---|---|---|---|
| 1 | Beitar Rehovot | 18 | – | – | – | 62 | 14 | +48 | 30 | Promoted to Liga Bet |
| 2 | Beitar Beit Dagan | 18 | – | – | – | 43 | 13 | +30 | 30 | |
| 3 | Hapoel Givat Brenner | 18 | – | – | – | 51 | 29 | +22 | 22 | |
| 4 | Maccabi Kfar Gvirol | 18 | – | – | – | 44 | 17 | +27 | 19 (Note: Four points deducted) | |
| 5 | Beitar Rishon LeZion | 18 | – | – | – | 29 | 42 | −13 | 18 | |
| 6 | Beitar Gedera | 18 | – | – | – | 28 | 46 | −18 | 16 | |
| 7 | Hapoel Gedera | 18 | – | – | – | 34 | 28 | +6 | 13 (Note: Two points deducted) | |
| 8 | Maccabi Ekron | 18 | – | – | – | 20 | 40 | −20 | 12 | |
| 9 | Hapoel Beit Dagan | 18 | – | – | – | 24 | 47 | −23 | 10 | |
| 10 | Hapoel Zarnuga | 18 | – | – | – | 7 | 66 | −59 | 2 | |

== Jerusalem Division ==
| Pos | Team | Pld | W | D | L | GF | GA | GD | Pts | Promotion |
|---|---|---|---|---|---|---|---|---|---|---|
| 1 | ASA Jerusalem | 14 | – | – | – | 45 | 9 | +36 | 24 | Promoted to Liga Bet |
| 2 | Beitar Beit Shemesh | 14 | – | – | – | 20 | 8 | +12 | 20 | |
| 3 | Hapoel Beit Shemesh | 14 | – | – | – | 36 | 9 | +27 | 19 | |
| 4 | Hapoel Katamonim | 14 | – | – | – | 23 | 14 | +9 | 17 | |
| 5 | Beitar Ein Karem | 14 | – | – | – | 16 | 34 | −18 | 10 | |
| 6 | Hapoel Beit Safafa | 14 | – | – | – | 15 | 30 | −15 | 7 | |
| 7 | Maccabi Beit Shemesh | 14 | – | – | – | 13 | 38 | −25 | 7 | |
| 8 | Hapoel HaDarom Jerusalem | 14 | – | – | – | 9 | 35 | −26 | 6 | |

== South A Division ==
| Pos | Team | Pld | W | D | L | GF | GA | GD | Pts | Promotion |
|---|---|---|---|---|---|---|---|---|---|---|
| 1 | Hapoel Kiryat Malakhi | 16 | – | – | – | 55 | 10 | +45 | 29 | Promoted to Liga Bet |
| 2 | Maccabi Kiryat Malakhi | 16 | – | – | – | 44 | 17 | +27 | 26 | |
| 3 | Hapoel Nehora | 16 | – | – | – | 31 | 21 | +10 | 21 | |
| 4 | Hapoel Sde Uziyahu | 16 | – | – | – | 38 | 24 | +14 | 18 | |
| 5 | Hapoel Beit Ezra | 16 | – | – | – | 32 | 36 | −4 | 13 | |
| 6 | Hapoel Hatzav | 16 | – | – | – | 25 | 32 | −7 | 13 | |
| 7 | Maccabi Yavne | 16 | – | – | – | 22 | 42 | −20 | 11 | |
| 8 | Maccabi Gan Yavne | 16 | – | – | – | 19 | 50 | −31 | 6 (Note: Two points deducted) | |
| 9 | Hapoel Yinon | 16 | – | – | – | 14 | 56 | −42 | 2 | |

== South B Division ==
| Pos | Team | Pld | W | D | L | GF | GA | GD | Pts | Qualification |
|---|---|---|---|---|---|---|---|---|---|---|
| 1 | Hapoel Ashdod | 14 | – | – | – | 51 | 4 | +47 | 27 | Promotion play-offs |
| 2 | Hapoel Gat | 14 | – | – | – | 31 | 16 | +15 | 17 | |
| 3 | Maccabi Ashdod | 14 | – | – | – | 19 | 22 | −3 | 15 | |
| 4 | Beitar Ashdod | 14 | – | – | – | 21 | 28 | −7 | 13 | |
| 5 | Hapoel Kiryat Gat | 14 | – | – | – | 27 | 28 | −1 | 11 (Note: Two points deducted) | |
| 6 | Maccabi Kiryat Gat | 14 | – | – | – | 19 | 24 | −5 | 11 | |
| 7 | Beitar Ashkelon | 14 | – | – | – | 16 | 33 | −17 | 8 | |
| 8 | Hapoel Shtulim | 14 | – | – | – | 16 | 45 | −29 | 4 | |

== Negev A Division ==
| Pos | Team | Pld | W | D | L | GF | GA | GD | Pts | Qualification |
|---|---|---|---|---|---|---|---|---|---|---|
| 1 | Hapoel Dimona | 12 | – | – | – | 42 | 9 | +33 | 21 | Promotion play-offs |
| 2 | Maccabi Be'er Sheva | 12 | – | – | – | 33 | 7 | +26 | 20 | |
| 3 | Hapoel Kfar Yeruham | 12 | – | – | – | 22 | 19 | +3 | 14 | |
| 4 | Hapoel Mashabei Sadeh | 12 | – | – | – | 23 | 33 | −10 | 8 | |
| 5 | Hapoel Mitzpe Ramon | 12 | – | – | – | 11 | 29 | −18 | 7 | |
| 6 | Beitar Dimona | 12 | – | – | – | 15 | 19 | −4 | 5 (Note: Four points deducted) | |
| 7 | Beitar Ofakim | 12 | – | – | – | 14 | 44 | −30 | 5 | |

== Negev B Division ==
| Pos | Team | Pld | W | D | L | GF | GA | GD | Pts | Promotion |
|---|---|---|---|---|---|---|---|---|---|---|
| 1 | Hapoel Be'eri | 18 | – | – | – | 75 | 16 | +59 | 33 | Promoted to Liga Bet |
| 2 | Hapoel Mefalsim | 18 | – | – | – | 54 | 24 | +30 | 28 | |
| 3 | Hapoel Erez | 18 | – | – | – | 38 | 27 | +11 | 24 | |
| 4 | Hapoel Gevim | 18 | – | – | – | 48 | 35 | +13 | 24 | |
| 5 | Hapoel Or HaNer | 18 | – | – | – | 32 | 29 | +3 | 15 | |
| 6 | Hapoel Bror Hayil | 18 | – | – | – | 38 | 39 | −1 | 15 | |
| 7 | Hapoel Mivtahim | 18 | – | – | – | 22 | 43 | −21 | 13 | |
| 8 | Hapoel Netivot | 18 | – | – | – | 21 | 62 | −41 | 9 | |
| 9 | Hapoel Sha'ariyot | 18 | – | – | – | 24 | 51 | −27 | 8 (Note: Two points deducted) | |
| 10 | Hapoel Shelahim | 18 | – | – | – | 16 | 42 | −26 | 7 | |

== Promotion play-offs ==
13 June 1964

| Hapoel Yagur | v | Al-Amal Acre |

13 June 1964

| Beitar Kiryat Tiv'on | 4 – 1 | Hapoel Beit She'an |

Nahariya Municipal Stadium
13 June 1964

| Hapoel Ashdod | w/o | Hapoel Dimona |

Maccabi Rehovot Ground

Beitar Kiryat Tiv'on, Hapoel Yagur and Hapoel Ashdod promoted to Liga Bet. Hapoel Ashdod promoted after their opponents, Hapoel Dimona, did not show up for the match.

== See also ==
- 1963–64 Liga Leumit
- 1963–64 Liga Alef
- 1963–64 Liga Bet
