= Nir Hasson (footballer) =

Israeli footballer (born 2001)

Personal information
- Date of birth: 19 December 2001 (age 24)
- Place of birth: Ashdod, Israel
- Position: Midfielder

Team information
- Current team: Hapoel Kfar Shalem

Youth career
- F.C. Ashdod

Senior career*
| Years | Team | Apps | (Gls) |
| 2020–2024 | F.C. Ashdod | 9 | (0) |
| 2021–2022 | → Hapoel Ashdod | 25 | (1) |
| 2023–2024 | → Hapoel Ramat Gan | 45 | (6) |
| 2024–2025 | Hapoel Afula | 15 | (0) |
| 2025– | Hapoel Kfar Shalem | 14 | (2) |
- * Club domestic league appearances and goals as of 15 October 2025

This article deals with the Israeli football player, not the Haaretz journalist

Nir Hasson (Hebrew: ניר חסון; born 19 December 2001) is an Israeli professional footballer who plays as a midfielder for Hapoel Kfar Shalem.
