= Beitar Petah Tikva F.C. =

Israeli football club

Beitar Petah Tikva
- Full name: Beitar Petah Tikva Football Club בית״ר פתח תקוה
- Founded: 1943
- Ground: Sportek Stadium, Kfar Sirkin
- Chairman: Dudu Sharon
- Manager: Alon Margoninski
- League: Liga Bet South A
- 2024–25: Liga Bet South A, 10th
Home colours	Away colours

Beitar Petah Tikva (Hebrew: בית״ר פתח תקוה) is an Israeli football club based in Petah Tikva. The club currently plays in Liga Bet South A division and play home matches at the Sportek Stadium in Kfar Sirkin.

== History ==
The club was founded in 1943, although Beitar branch in Petah Tikva was founded in 1928 and footballing activities in the branch have occurred already in 1939. The club played its first match on 20 February 1943, against a reserve team of Beitar Tel Aviv, losing 1–3.

In the 1943–44 season, the club played at the second-tier league of the Palestine League, alongside several reserve teams of clubs which have played at the 1943–44 Palestine League. Beitar Petah Tikva finished after league winners, Beitar Netanya; However, no club was promoted, after the EIFA has previously decided that no club would be promoted to the Palestine League or relegated from there.

Beitar was included in the South division of Liga Bet, the second tier as of then, for the 1946–47 season; However, they were not among the nine clubs which have finished the league.

After the Israeli Declaration of Independence, the club played in the lower divisions of Israeli football, with the highest tier in which the club reached, was Liga Bet, which was the third tier at the time, where the club played in the North B division from the 1964–65 season until they were relegated at the end of the 1968–69 season. Prior to that season, the club merged with other Beitar club from Petah Tikva, Beitar Mahane Yehuda, and became Beitar Petah Tikva\Mahane Yehuda, before reverting to Beitar Petah Tikva in the 1980s.

The club currently plays in Liga Bet South A division (now the fourth tier), where they play since promotion from Liga Gimel Sharon division, after runners-up finish at the 2011–12 season.

== Honours ==
=== League ===
Honour	No.	Years
Third tier	1	1954–55^{1}
Fourth tier	1	1963–64
Sixth tier	1	2008–09

^{1}Won by Beitar Mahane Yehuda
