= Itche Menahem =

Israeli footballer (1939–2014)

Itche Menahem איצ'ה מנחם
Personal information
- Full name: Itzhak "Itche" Menahem
- Date of birth: 1939
- Place of birth: Tel Aviv, Israel
- Date of death: 18 June 2014 (age 75)
- Positions: Winger; goalkeeper

Youth career
- Maccabi Tel Aviv
- Hapoel Tel Aviv

Senior career*
Years	Team	Apps	(Gls)
1957–1962	Hapoel Tel Aviv	72	(12)

Managerial career
- Hapoel Holon
- Hapoel Tel Aviv
- * Club domestic league appearances and goals

Itche Menahem (Hebrew: איצ'ה מנחם; 1939 – 18 June 2014) was an Israeli football player and manager who played for and managed Hapoel Tel Aviv. From 2003 to 2007 he was the president of the Israel Football Association.

== Honours ==
Hapoel Tel Aviv

- Israeli Premier League: 1956–57
- Israel State Cup: 1961
