= Aviram Rubinstein =

Israeli footballer

Aviram Rubinstein אבירם רובינשטיין
Personal information
- Full name: Aviram Rubinstein
- Date of birth: March 19, 1980 (age 46)
- Place of birth: Netanya, Israel
- Position: Striker

Youth career
- Maccabi Netanya

Senior career*
Years	Team	Apps	(Gls)
1998–2001	Maccabi Netanya		
2001–2003	Hapoel Ra'anana		
2003–2004	Hapoel Hod HaSharon		
2004–2007	Maccabi Ironi Kfar Yona		
2007	Hapoel Pardesiya		
- * Club domestic league appearances and goals

Aviram Rubinstein (Hebrew: אבירם רובינשטיין) is a former Israeli footballer who played in Maccabi Netanya.

He is the son of Yanek Rubinstein, also a former footballer who played in Netanya.

== Honours ==
- Israeli Second Division (1):
  - 1998-99
