= Benny Alon =

Israeli footballer

Benny Alon בני אלון
Personal information
- Date of birth: 13 September 1950 (age 76)
- Place of birth: Kiryat Bialik, Israel
- Position: Midfielder

Senior career*
| Years | Team | Apps | (Gls) |
- Hapoel Haifa
| 1975–1977 | Chicago Sting | 58 | (7) |
- * Club domestic league appearances and goals

Benny Alon (Hebrew: בני אלון) is an Israeli former footballer, active in the 1970s. The top scorer of the Liga Leumit for 1973–74, he spent three seasons in the North American Soccer League.

Alon scored 15 goals for Hapoel Haifa in 1973–74. He played the summers of 1975, 1976, and 1977 for the Chicago Sting of the North American Soccer League.
