= 1973–74 Liga Leumit =

Football season

Liga Leumit
- Season: 1973–74
- Champions: Maccabi Netanya; 2nd title
- Relegated: Maccabi Haifa
- Top goalscorer: Benny Alon (15)

The 1973–74 Liga Leumit season saw Maccabi Netanya win their second title. Benny Alon of Hapoel Haifa was the league's top scorer with 15 goals.

The bottom two clubs, Hakoah Ramat Gan (who had won the title the previous season) and Maccabi Haifa took part in a play-off group with the top four clubs from Liga Alef to decide promotion and relegation. The top two clubs would remain in/be promoted to Liga Leumit, whilst the bottom four would start the 1974–75 season in Liga Alef. At the end of the play-offs, Hakoah Ramat Gan retained their place in the top division, whilst Shimshon Tel Aviv were promoted with Maccabi Haifa being relegated.

== Final table ==
Pos	Team	Pld	W	D	L	GF	GA	GD	Pts	Qualification
1	Maccabi Netanya	30	13	11	6	32	19	+13	37	Champions
2	Maccabi Tel Aviv	30	12	11	7	36	18	+18	35	
3	Beitar Jerusalem	30	12	10	8	27	26	+1	34	
4	Hapoel Petah Tikva	30	11	10	9	35	31	+4	32	
5	Beitar Tel Aviv	30	11	10	9	31	31	0	32	
6	Hapoel Haifa	30	12	8	10	31	44	−13	32	
7	Hapoel Be'er Sheva	30	9	13	8	34	25	+9	31	
8	Hapoel Kfar Saba	30	10	11	9	31	26	+5	31	
9	Maccabi Jaffa	30	7	16	7	29	29	0	30	
10	Bnei Yehuda	30	6	16	8	21	24	−3	28	
11	Hapoel Jerusalem	30	6	16	8	21	25	−4	28	
12	Maccabi Petah Tikva	30	6	16	8	21	31	−10	28	
13	Hapoel Hadera	30	6	15	9	24	32	−8	27	
14	Hapoel Tel Aviv	30	7	12	11	25	24	+1	26	
15	Hakoah Ramat Gan	30	7	12	11	36	41	−5	26	Promotion/relegation play-offs
16	Maccabi Haifa	30	9	5	16	33	41	−8	23	Promotion/relegation play-offs

Source: rsssf.com

== Results ==
Home \ Away	BEI	BTA	BnY	HAR	HBS	HAH	HHA	HJE	HKS	HPT	HTA	MHA	MJA	MNE	MPT	MTA
Beitar Jerusalem	—	2–0	1–0	0–0	1–0	2–1	2–1	5–1	0–1	1–0	1–2	2–0	0–0	0–0	0–0	1–0
Beitar Tel Aviv	1–1	—	0–1	3–2	1–0	0–0	3–0	1–1	1–0	1–1	1–1	1–0	1–1	0–0	1–4	1–0
Bnei Yehuda	2–1	2–3	—	0–0	0–0	0–0	3–1	1–1	0–0	1–2	0–0	2–0	0–0	1–1	0–0	0–1
Hakoah Ramat Gan	0–0	1–0	1–1	—	2–2	2–2	6–0	0–2	3–1	0–1	2–1	0–0	0–3	0–2	1–1	0–2
Hapoel Be'er Sheva	5–0	2–0	2–1	1–1	—	0–0	0–1	1–0	2–0	0–0	0–0	2–1	4–1	0–3	5–0	2–1
Hapoel Hadera	1–0	2–1	1–1	0–2	0–0	—	1–2	0–0	2–1	1–1	1–1	0–3	1–1	0–2	1–1	1–0
Hapoel Haifa	2–0	1–1	0–0	3–1	3–2	2–0	—	0–0	1–1	1–1	0–2	1–2	2–1	2–1	1–0	0–0
Hapoel Jerusalem	1–1	0–0	2–0	0–0	0–0	1–0	3–0	—	0–0	0–0	0–0	1–0	0–0	2–0	1–1	0–2
Hapoel Kfar Saba	1–2	2–0	0–0	1–0	1–0	1–1	4–0	2–1	—	0–1	1–0	3–1	1–2	0–0	0–1	2–2
Hapoel Petah Tikva	1–2	0–0	0–0	1–3	1–1	3–1	1–1	2–1	1–0	—	0–0	3–0	0–1	1–0	2–1	0–3
Hapoel Tel Aviv	2–0	0–1	1–2	5–1	1–1	1–1	0–1	0–0	0–3	2–0	—	1–0	2–0	0–1	0–0	0–1
Maccabi Haifa	1–1	2–3	2–1	2–1	1–1	0–1	4–1	2–1	2–3	4–3	2–1	—	0–1	2–0	0–0	0–0
Maccabi Jaffa	0–0	3–2	1–1	1–1	2–0	2–2	1–2	0–0	0–0	1–2	1–1	2–1	—	1–1	1–2	1–2
Maccabi Netanya	0–1	1–0	0–0	3–1	0–0	1–3	4–1	1–0	1–1	2–1	2–0	2–1	0–0	—	3–1	1–0
Maccabi Petah Tikva	0–0	0–2	0–1	0–2	2–0	0–0	0–0	2–2	1–1	0–5	2–1	1–0	1–1	0–0	—	0–0
Maccabi Tel Aviv	3–0	1–2	3–0	3–3	1–1	1–0	0–1	4–0	1–1	3–1	0–0	2–0	0–0	0–0	0–0	—

Legend: Blue = home team win; Yellow = draw; Red = away team win.

== Promotion and relegation play-offs ==
Pos	Team	Pld	W	D	L	GF	GA	GD	Pts	Promotion or relegation
1	Hakoah Ramat Gan	5	4	0	1	14	6	+8	8	Remained in Liga Leumit
2	Shimshon Tel Aviv	5	4	0	1	10	4	+6	8	Promoted to Liga Leumit
3	Hapoel Marmorek	5	2	1	2	7	6	+1	5	Liga Alef
4	Maccabi Haifa	5	2	0	3	7	8	−1	4	Relegated to Liga Alef
5	Hapoel Acre	5	2	0	3	8	10	−2	4	Liga Alef
6	Maccabi Sha'arayim	5	0	1	4	5	17	−12	1	Liga Alef

Source: rsssf.com
