= Israel Fogel =

Israeli footballer

Israel Fogel ישראל פוגל
Personal information
- Full name: Israel Fogel
- Date of birth: 2 April 1949 (age 77)
- Place of birth: Israel
- Position: Striker

Youth career
- Hapoel Kfar Saba

Senior career*
Years	Team	Apps	(Gls)
1966–1985	Hapoel Kfar Saba	415	(151)
1985–1987	Beitar Netanya	37	(19)
1987–1988	Hapoel Kiryat-Ono		
1988–1989	Maccabi Herzliya	0	(0)

International career
1975–1980	Israel	5	(0)
- * Club domestic league appearances and goals

Israel Fogel (Hebrew: ישראל פוגל; born 2 April 1949) is an Israeli retired footballer.

== Honours ==
- Israeli Premier League (1):
  - 1981–82
- Israel State Cup (2):
  - 1975, 1980
- Israeli Second Division (1):
  - 1985-86
