= Benny Rubinstein =

Israeli footballer

Benny Rubinstein בני רובינשטיין
Personal information
- Full name: Benny Rubinstein
- Date of birth: 1952 (age 73–74)
- Place of birth: Netanya, Israel
- Positions: Midfielder; striker

Youth career
- Maccabi Netanya

Senior career*
Years	Team	Apps	(Gls)
1969–1971	Maccabi Netanya	9	(0)
- Hapoel Netanya
- * Club domestic league appearances and goals

Benny Rubinstein
Medal record

Representing Israel

Football

Maccabiah Games
Gold medal – first place	1969 Maccabiah	Football

Benny Rubinstein (Hebrew: בני רובינשטיין) is an Israeli former footballer and current real estate developer. He played soccer for Maccabi Netanya and Hapoel Netanya. At the 1969 Maccabiah Games, Rubinstein played soccer for Israel, winning a gold medal.

== Biography ==
Rubinstein was born in Netanya, Israel. His wife is Sarah Rubinstein. Benny's son, Aviram also played football for Maccabi Netanya.

He played soccer for Maccabi Netanya and Hapoel Netanya. At the 1969 Maccabiah Games, Rubinstein played soccer for Israel, winning a gold medal.

Rubinstein then worked as a real estate agent, and now works in real estate development.

== Honours ==
- Israeli Premier League (1):
  - 1970-71
