= Moshe Shlomovich =

Israeli footballer

Moshe Shlomovich 'משה שלומוביץ
Personal information
- Date of birth: 1949 (age 76–77)
- Place of birth: Israel

Youth career
- Maccabi Netanya

Senior career*
Years	Team	Apps	(Gls)
1969–1974	Maccabi Netanya		(3)

International career
- Israel U21
- * Club domestic league appearances and goals

Moshe Shlomovich (Hebrew: משה שלומוביץ'; born 1949) is an Israeli former footballer who played for Maccabi Netanya. He is the younger brother of Eliezer Shlomovich.

== Honours ==
Maccabi Netanya

- Israeli Premier League:
  - 1970–71, 1973–74
