= Michael Sheinfeld =

Israeli footballer and manager

Michael Sheinfeld מיכאל שיינפלד
Personal information
- Full name: Michael Sheinfeld
- Date of birth: May 22, 1943 (age 83)
- Place of birth: Israel
- Position: Goalkeeper

Youth career
- Hapoel Petah Tikva

Senior career*
Years	Team	Apps	(Gls)
1961–1969	Hapoel Petah Tikva	57	(0)
1969–1973	Shimshon Tel Aviv		(0)
1973–1977	Maccabi Netanya		(0)

Managerial career
- 1978–1979: Hapoel Petah Tikva
- * Club domestic league appearances and goals

Michael Sheinfeld (Hebrew: מיכאל שיינפלד) is a former Israeli footballer and manager.

== Honours ==
- Championships
  - 1961–62, 1962–63, 1973–74
- Israeli Supercup
  - 1974
