= Eliezer Shlomovich =

Israeli footballer

Eliezer Shlomovich 'אליעזר שלומוביץ
Personal information
- Full name: Eliezer Shlomovich
- Date of birth: 1947 (age 78–79)
- Place of birth: Italy
- Position: Striker

Youth career
- Maccabi Netanya

Senior career*
Years	Team	Apps	(Gls)
1965–1975	Maccabi Netanya	257	(69)
- * Club domestic league appearances and goals

Eliezer Shlomovich (Hebrew: אליעזר שלומוביץ'; born 1947) is an Israeli former footballer who played for Maccabi Netanya.

His younger brother Moshe also played football; both played together at Maccabi Netanya.

== Honours ==
- Israeli Premier League: 1970–71, 1973–74
- Israeli Supercup: 1971, 1974
