= 1969–70 Liga Alef =

Liga Alef
- Season: 1969-70
- Champions: North Division - Hapoel Hadera; South Division - Hapoel Holon
- Promoted: North Division - Hapoel Hadera; South Division - Hapoel Holon
- Relegated: North Division - Hapoel Kiryat Haim, Beitar Kiryat Tiv'on; South Division - Beitar Be'er Sheva, Hapoel Sderot

The 1969–70 Liga Alef season saw Hapoel Hadera (champions of the North Division) and Hapoel Holon (champions of the South Division) win the title and promotion to Liga Leumit.

== North Division ==
Pos	Team	Pld	W	D	L	GF	GA	GD	Pts	Promotion or relegation
1	Hapoel Hadera	30	18	7	5	41	20	+21	43	Promoted to Liga Leumit
2	Hapoel Herzliya	30	11	13	6	31	29	+2	35	
3	Hapoel Acre	30	13	9	8	43	30	+13	32 (Note: 3 points deducted?)	
4	Beitar Netanya	30	14	3	13	39	31	+8	31	
5	Hapoel Mahane Yehuda	30	14	2	14	37	38	−1	30	
6	Hapoel Netanya	30	12	5	13	40	36	+4	29	
7	Hapoel Tiberias	30	11	7	12	40	38	+2	29	
8	Hapoel Nahliel	30	10	9	11	43	44	−1	29	
9	Hapoel Kiryat Shmona	30	11	7	12	29	31	−2	29	
10	Hapoel Bnei Nazareth	30	9	11	10	27	29	−2	29	
11	Maccabi Herzliya	30	11	7	12	28	32	−4	29	
12	Maccabi Hadera	30	12	4	14	44	40	+4	28	
13	Hapoel Ramat Gan	30	10	8	12	34	31	+3	28	
14	Hapoel Tirat HaCarmel	30	11	6	13	26	38	−12	28	
15	Hapoel Kiryat Haim	30	9	9	12	24	28	−4	27	Relegated to Liga Bet
16	Beitar Kiryat Tiv'on	30	8	4	18	37	59	−22	20	Relegated to Liga Bet

== South Division ==
Pos	Team	Pld	W	D	L	GF	GA	GD	Pts	Promotion or relegation
1	Hapoel Holon	30	21	7	2	59	20	+39	49	Promoted to Liga Leumit
2	Maccabi Ramat Amidar	30	19	8	3	79	31	+48	46	
3	Maccabi Sha'arayim	30	20	3	7	66	28	+38	43	
4	Hapoel Rishon LeZion	30	12	8	10	55	48	+7	32	
5	Hapoel Kiryat Ono	30	12	7	11	60	53	+7	31	
6	Hapoel Bat Yam	30	11	7	12	30	33	−3	29	
7	Hapoel Eilat	30	11	6	13	40	57	−17	28	
8	Hapoel Ashkelon	30	9	8	13	32	52	−20	26	
9	Hapoel Lod	30	9	7	14	50	52	−2	25	
10	Beitar Lod	30	6	13	11	33	39	−6	25	
11	Beitar Ramla	30	8	9	13	34	43	−9	25	
12	SK Nes Tziona	30	8	9	13	30	46	−16	25	
13	Hapoel Be'er Ya'akov	30	8	9	13	32	51	−19	25	
14	Hapoel Marmorek	30	7	10	13	47	50	−3	24	
15	Beitar Be'er Sheva	30	9	6	15	36	61	−25	24	Relegated to Liga Bet
16	Hapoel Sderot	30	7	8	15	35	54	−19	22	Relegated to Liga Bet
