= Hapoel Eilat F.C. =

Hapoel Eilat
- Full name: Hapoel Eilat Football Club הפועל אילת
- Founded: 1951
- Dissolved: 1999

Hapoel Eilat (Hebrew: הפועל אילת) was an Israeli football club based in Eilat, Israel's southernmost city. The club played four seasons in Liga Alef, then the second tier of Israeli football league system.

== History ==
The club was founded in 1951. During the 1950s, the club played mostly in friendlies against military teams, and in regional independent league, comprising clubs from Eilat and nearby. In 1958, Hapoel Eilat were admitted to the Israel Football Association and joined Liga Gimel.

At the end of the 1959–60 season, Eilat were promoted to Liga Bet, the third tier of Israeli football at the time, after they finished at the top four of the Promotion play-offs for Liga Gimel clubs. In the 1968–69 season, the club won Liga Bet South B division, and were promoted to Liga Alef for the first time in their history. In 1969–70, the club's first season at the second tier, they reached their best placing ever, which was seventh. The club played in Liga Alef South division until the 1972–73, in which they finished second bottom, and relegated back to Liga Bet, after four seasons playing in the second tier. In the 1977–78 season, they finished second bottom in Liga Bet South B division, and dropped to Liga Gimel, which at the time became the fifth tier of Israeli football, since the creation of Liga Artzit in 1976. In 1984–85, the club returned to Liga Bet, where they played until they were suspended from the league, prior to the 1999–2000 season, and eventually folded.

A successor club, A.S. Eilat, was founded and reached Liga Bet. However A.S. Eilat folded as well, after last being active at the 2004–05 season. Currently football in Eilat is represented by Bnei Eilat F.C., which are not related to the football clubs which have previously operated in Eilat. (Hapoel Eilat and A.S. Eilat).

== Honours ==
=== League ===
Honour	No.	Years
Third tier	1	1968–69
Fourth tier	1	1959–60
Fifth tier	1	1983–84

== See also ==
- Bnei Eilat
