= Maccabi HaShikma Ramat Hen F.C. =

Israeli football club

Maccabi HaShikma Ramat Hen
- Full name: Maccabi HaShikma Ramat Hen Football Club מועדון כדורגל מכבי השקמה רמת חן
- Nickname: HaShikma
- Short name: Maccabi HaShikma Hen
- Founded: 1966 as Maccabi Ramat HaShikma; 1968 as Maccabi HaShikma Ramat Gan; 1989 as Maccabi HaShikma Ramat Hen
- Ground: HaShikma, Ramat Gan
- Capacity: 1,000
- Chairman: Asher Loria
- League: Liga Gimel Tel Aviv
- 2015–16: 2nd
Home colours	Away colours

Maccabi HaShikma Ramat Hen Football Club (Hebrew: מועדון כדורגל מכבי השקמה רמת חן) is an Israeli football club based in Ramat Gan. They are currently in Liga Gimel.

== History ==
The club was founded in 1966 in the neighborhood of Ramat HaShikma, Ramat Gan as Maccabi Ramat HaShikma. In their first season of existence, which was actually the "double season" of 1966–68, they won their regional division of Liga Gimel and qualified for the promotion play-offs, where they were one place short of promotion to Liga Bet. However, in the summer of 1968, they merged with Liga Bet Club, Maccabi Ramat Gan, and went on to compete in the following season in Liga Bet as Maccabi HaShikma Ramat Gan.

The club won Liga Bet South A division in the 1974–75 season, and won promotion to Liga Alef, where they spent their only season up to date in the second tier of Israeli football, and placed ninth. However, as the 1975–76 Liga Alef season was the last Liga Alef season in the second tier, the ninth place was not enough to secure a place in the newly formed Liga Artzit, thus, the club was relegated to the new Liga Alef (now as third tier).

In 1989, the club merged with fellow neighborhood club, Maccabi Ramat Hen, and since then has been called Maccabi HaShikma Ramat Hen. In the first seasons following the merging, former top tier strikers and Israeli internationals, David Lavi and Vicky Peretz played for the club.

In 2004, following the demotion of Maccabi Kiryat Gat to Liga Alef by the Israeli Football Association, the club was promoted to Liga Artzit (then the third tier), where they played four seasons until relegated back to Liga Alef in the 2007–08 season. In the 2009–10 season, the club finished second in Liga Alef South (now again the third tier, following the closure of Liga Artzit), and advanced to the promotion play-offs, where they defeated the second placed team in the North division, Ironi Sayid Umm al-Fahm on penalties and qualified for the decisive match against the fourteenth placed club in Liga Leumit, Maccabi Be'er Sheva. However, the HaShikma team was beaten 0–2, thus remaining in Liga Alef.

In the 2011–12 season, the club finished at the bottom of Liga Alef South, and was relegated to Liga Bet. The following season, the club did not enter Liga Bet, and started the 2013–14 season in Liga Gimel, the lowest tier of Israeli football, registering under the name Maccabi HaShikma Hen.

In the Israel State Cup, the best progression of the club was reaching the quarter finals on three occasions: in 1975 they lost 2–3 to Maccabi Jaffa after extra time (first match ended 0–0), in 1991 they lost 2–4 on aggregate (1–4, 1–0) to Hapoel Petah Tikva, and in 2007 they lost 0–2 to Hapoel Ashkelon. Despite HaShikma being eliminated on aggregate, their 1–0 victory over Hapoel Petah Tikva was most notable as a shock defeat considering the fact that Hapoel Petah Tikva finished second in the top division of 1990–91.

== Honours ==
- Liga Bet South A:
  - 1974–75
  - 1983–84
  - 1989–90
  - 2001–02
- Liga Gimel Jaffa:
  - 1966–68
- Liga Gimel Tel Aviv:
  - 1996–97
  - 1998–99

== Notable former players ==
- Vicky Peretz (1953–2021), international footballer

== Notable former coaches ==
- Vicky Peretz
