= Zohar Solomon =

Israeli footballer

Zohar Solomon זהר סולומון
Personal information
- Full name: Zohar Solomon
- Place of birth: Israel
- Position: Midfielder

Youth career
- Maccabi Netanya

Senior career*
| Years | Team | Apps | (Gls) |
| 1966–1977 | Maccabi Netanya | 215 | (5) |
| 1977–19?? | Hapoel Hedera | | |
- * Club domestic league appearances and goals

Zohar Solomon (Hebrew: זהר סולומון) is a former Israeli footballer who is most famous for playing in Maccabi Netanya, where he was an important part in the club's first two historic championships.

== Honours ==
- Israeli Premier League (2):
  - 1970–71, 1973–74
