= Beitar Kiryat Tiv'on F.C. =

Beitar Kiryat Tiv'on
- Full name: Beitar Kiryat Tiv'on Football Club בית"ר קרית טבעון
- Founded: 1962
- Dissolved: 1971
- Ground: Kiryat Tiv'on Ground, Kiryat Tiv'on
- 1970–71: Liga Bet North A, 15th (Relegated)

Beitar Kiryat Tiv'on (Hebrew: בית"ר קרית טבעון) was an Israeli football club based in Kiryat Tiv'on. The club played one season in Liga Alef, then the second tier of Israeli football league system.

== History ==
The club was founded in 1962 and joined Liga Gimel Haifa division. In 1963–64, their second season of existence, the club won Liga Gimel Valleys B division and qualified for the Promotion play-offs, where they beat the Valleys A division champions, Hapoel Beit She'an, by a result of 4–1, and were promoted to Liga Bet, the third tier of Israeli football at the time. After four seasons playing at the third tier, the club won Liga Bet North A division in the 1968–69 season and made historic promotion to the second tier, Liga Alef. However, the club finished bottom of Liga Alef North in the 1969–70 season and dropped back to Liga Bet. In the following season, Kiryat Tiv'on finished second bottom in the North A division and were set to be relegated to Liga Gimel, due to worst goal difference by a single goal than the third bottom club, Beitar Nahariya. After the season ended, Kiryat Tiv'on have appealed over a loss by forfeit of 0–3 to Hapoel Sde Nahum\Beit She'an for not showing up for the match. The Israel Football Association have accepted the appeal and ordered a new match, which was won 2–1 by Kiryat Tiv'on and would have keep the club in Liga Bet. At that point, Beitar Nahariya have appealed over the match result, claiming the match was fixed. After Kiryat Tiv'on's chairman admitted to the match-fixing allegations, the club was permanently expelled from the Israel Football Association and eventually folded.

== Honours ==
=== League ===
Honour	No.	Years
Third tier	1	1968–69
Fourth tier	1	1963–64

== Notable former managers ==
- Avraham Ginzburg
- Jonny Hardy
- Shimon Shenhar
