= Holon Yermiyahu F.C. =

Israeli football club

Hapoel Holon
- Full name: Hapoel Holon Football Club הפועל חולון
- Nickname: Huloniya
- Founded: 1946
- Dissolved: 1985
- 1984–85: Liga Artzit, 6th
Home colours	Away colours

Hapoel Holon (Hebrew: הפועל חולון) was an Israeli football club based in Holon. It ceased to exist in 1985 when it merged with Tzafririm Holon to form Hapoel Tzafririm Holon. In summer 2014 the club was resurrected by local businessmen.

In summer 2016 Hapoel Tzafririm Holon and F.C. Holon Yaniv merged to "Hapoel Holon" and the club refounded.

== History ==
Founded in 1946, the club was placed in the Tel Aviv Division of Liga Meuhedet following independence in 1948.

The club was promoted to Liga Alef (then the second division) after winning Liga Bet South B division in the 1961–62 season. At the end of the 1969–70 season the club was promoted to Liga Leumit (then the top division) for the first time in their history, after winning 2–1 against Maccabi Ramat Amidar. However, they finished bottom in their first season in the top flight, and were relegated back to Liga Alef. In 1972–73 they narrowly missed out on promotion, finishing as runners-up to Bnei Yehuda. They missed out on promotion by a single place in 1978–79, but were relegated to Liga Alef at the end of the 1980–81 season. They returned to the second division at the end of the 1982–83 season after winning 3–0 against Maccabi Hadera in the Promotion play-offs.

In 1985 the club merged with Liga Alef club Tzafririm Holon to form Hapoel Tzafririm Holon.

== F.C. Holon Yermiyahu ==
F.C. Holon Yermiyahu
- Full name: Moadon Kaduregel Holon Yermiyahu מועדון כדורגל חולון ירמיהו
- Nickname: Huloniya
- Founded: 2014 (As F.C. Holon Yaniv)
- Ground: Municipal Stadium, Holon
- Capacity: 3,000
- Chairman: Rafi Arazi
- Manager: Avi Ragas
- League: Liga Alef South
- 2024–25: Liga Alef South, 6th of 16
Home colours	Away colours

In summer 2014 local businessmen Itzik Sasson and Ofer Delian, who are also the sponsors of Ironi Holon of the Israeli Beach Soccer League, initiated the re-establishment of the club. The club was due to start the 2014–15 season in Liga Gimel. Shlomi Shlomo has been appointed as head coach.

Due to naming dispute with Hapoel Tzafririm Holon, the club registered at the Israel Football Association under the name of F.C. Holon "Yaniv" (Hebrew: מועדון כדורגל חולון יניב), Moadon Kaduregel Holon "Yaniv", lit. Football Club Holon "Yaniv" (or in short Hebrew: מ.כ. חולון יניב Mem Kaf Holon "Yaniv", lit. F.C. Holon "Yaniv").

On 20 October 2014, the club won the Israel State Cup for Liga Gimel Central division, following a victory of 2–1 against Maccabi Kiryat Ekron. The club continued its success in the 2014–15 Israel State Cup, after they eliminated on penalties two clubs from Liga Alef, Maccabi Sha'arayim and Hapoel Asi Gilboa, and qualified for the Eighth round, in which they were defeated 1–4 by Maccabi Sektzia Ma'alot-Tarshiha.

The club finished their first season as F.C. Holon Yaniv, on top of Liga Gimel Central, and won promotion to Liga Bet.

On 7 July 2016 the club merged with Hapoel Tzafririm Holon to "Hapoel Holon".

At the end of 2016–17 season, the club promoted to Liga Alef, But Tzafririm retired from the club and the club changed his name to F.C. Holon Yermiyahu named the former player Haim Yermiyahu who died one year before.

== Current squad ==
As to 12 January 2026

No.	Pos.	Nation	Player
1	GK	ISR	Netanel Elgarisi
4	MF	ISR	Oshri Tadela
5	DF	ISR	Dmytro Entin
8	FW	ISR	Kachal Yosef
9	MF	ISR	Ori Agayev
11	MF	ISR	Ben Cohen
13	MF	ISR	Amit Kodman
14	MF	ISR	Or Sinai
15	DF	ISR	Sean Buskila
16	DF	ISR	Shoham Cohen
17	MF	ISR	Michael Ben Ami

No.	Pos.	Nation	Player
18	FW	ISR	Liran Tubul
22	MF	ISR	Amit Bohadana
23	DF	ISR	Liel Marziano
44	GK	ISR	Rotem Dahan
55	DF	ISR	Roy Benbenisti
70	DF	ISR	Itay Ben Hemo
77	MF	ISR	Kfir Hamias
88	MF	ISR	Daniel de Wondeler
90	FW	ISR	Aviv Abukasis
97	DF	ISR	Yuval Agamon

== Honours ==
=== League ===
Honour	No.	Years
Second tier	1	1969–70
Third tier	1	1961–62
Fourth tier	1	1955–56
Fifth tier	1	2014–15^{1}

=== Cup competitions ===
Honour	No.	Years
Liga Alef Super Cup	1	1970
Liga Gimel Central Division Cup	1	2014–15^{1}

^{1}Achieved by F.C. Holon Yaniv

== Notable former managers ==
- Ya'akov Hodorov
- Itche Menahem
