= Hapoel Kfar Shalem F.C. =

Israeli football club

Hapoel Kfar Shalem
- Full name: Hapoel Kfar Shalem Football Club הפועל כפר שלם
- Founded: 1957
- Ground: Hatikva Neighborhood Stadium, Tel Aviv
- Capacity: 2,700
- Owner(s): Ofer Atia, Eitan Aharon
- Chairman: Avihai Yehiye
- Manager: Yaron Hochenboim
- League: Liga Leumit
- 2025–26: Liga Leumit, 5th of 16
Home colours	Away colours

Hapoel Kfar Shalem (Hebrew: הפועל כפר שלם) is an Israeli football club based in the Kfar Shalem neighbourhood of Tel Aviv. They are currently in Liga Leumit, and play home matches at Hatikva Neighborhood Stadium.

== History ==
A chart showing the progress of Hapoel Kfar Shalem through the Israeli football league system, from 1962–63 to the present

The club was founded in 1958, and started at Liga Dalet, the lowest tier of Israeli football at the time. However, they were quickly promoted to Liga Gimel, and prior to the 1963–64 season, they were promoted to Liga Bet by the Israeli Football Association, after winning a special draw, in order to make an even number of clubs in Liga Bet North B division.

In the following season, the club was transferred to Liga Bet South A division, and made history by winning the division, and promotion to Liga Alef, the second tier of Israeli football at the time. the club finished their first season in Liga Alef South in the 11th place. however, in the following season, which was actually the "double season" of 1966–68, the club finished bottom with 10 wins out of 60 matches, and relegated back to Liga Bet.

By the late 1980s, the club returned to Liga Alef (now as third tier), and in 1995 were promoted to Liga Artzit, and made a return to the second tier of Israeli football after 27 years. however, their spell in Liga Artzit lasted one season, as they finished bottom at the 1995–96 season with 4 wins out of 30 matches, and relegated back to Liga Alef.

In the 2006–07 season, the club finished runners-up in Liga Alef South behind champions, Hapoel Maxim Lod. however, as the latter folded, Kfar Shalem was promoted instead to Liga Artzit (now as third tier). in the following season in Liga Artzit, the club finished bottom once more, with 4 wins out of 33 matches, and relegated back to Liga Alef (now as third tier, following the closure of Liga Artzit in 2009), where they played until their promotion to the second division in 2020.

== Current squad ==
As to 29 March, 2026

No.	Pos.	Nation	Player
1	GK	ISR	Tomer Tzarfati
2	DF	ISR	Liran Spiegel
3	DF	ISR	Itay Brahum
4	DF	ISR	Idan Weinberg
5	DF	ISR	Eitan Aharon
6	MF	ISR	Ran Rival
7	FW	ISR	Rom Savitch
8	MF	ISR	Yoav Junio
9	FW	ISR	Orel Baye
10	MF	ISR	Nir Hasson
11	FW	ISR	Matan Beit Ya'akov
17	MF	GHA	Abass Samari Salifu
18	MF	ISR	Or Dasa

No.	Pos.	Nation	Player
19	MF	ISR	Yali Danor
20	DF	ISR	Tamir Berman
23	DF	ISR	Dror Nir
25	DF	ISR	Ron Feldman
26	GK	ISR	Omer Kabilo
28	DF	ISR	Omer Korsia
29	FW	NGA	Ibeh Ransom
32	FW	ISR	Yaniv Mizrahi
33	FW	COL	Alex Castro
77	FW	ISR	Amit Nimni
80	MF	ISR	Ori Edri
—	MF	ISR	Yuval Ashkenazi
—	MF	ISR	Lotem Asras

== Honours ==
=== League ===
Honour	No.	Years
Third tier	2	1964–65, 1994–95
