= Beitar Ramat Gan F.C. =

Israeli football club

Beitar Ramat Gan
- Full name: Beitar Ramat Gan Football Club בית״ר רמת גן
- Founded: 1939
- Ground: Ramat Gan Training Ground, Ramat Gan
- Chairman: David Shaul
- Manager: Dudu Halaf
- League: Liga Bet South A
- 2024–25: Liga Bet South A, 3th
| Home colours | Away colours |

Beitar Ramat Gan (Hebrew: בית״ר רמת גן) is an Israeli football club based in Ramat Gan. The club currently plays in Liga Bet South A division.

== History ==
The club was founded in 1939. In their first season of existence, the club played in the Samaria regional division, which was considered as the third tier at the time. It is known that Maccabi Kfar Saba and Hapoel Kfar Saba finished in the top places, however, Beitar were victorious by a result of 4–0 against Hapoel Kfar Saba on March 30, 1940.

In 1946, Beitar made their debut in the Palestine Cup, where they lost in the first round 3–6 on aggregate (1–4, 2–2) to Hakoah 09 Tel Aviv, with the first leg abandoned due to unruly behavior of the Beitar players.

In the 1946–47 season, the club played in Liga Bet, the second tier of football in the British Mandate for Palestine at the time, and finished eight out of nine in the South division. Following the Israeli Declaration of Independence, the club played in Liga Meuhedet, the temporary second tier in the 1949–50 season, and finished sixth out of nine in the Sharon division. As a result, they were relegated, and did not return to the second tier of Israeli football ever since.

In the 1964–65 season the club returned to Liga Bet (now as the third tier), where they played for thirteen seasons. In 1976, following the creation of Liga Artzit, Liga Bet became the fourth tier of Israeli football, and at the end of the 1977–78 season, Beitar finished bottom in Liga Bet South A division, and relegated to Liga Gimel, the fifth tier of Israeli football.

By winning Liga Gimel Tel Aviv division in 1997–98, the club returned to Liga Bet, where they play now.

== Honours ==
=== League ===
| Honour | No. | Years |
|---|---|---|
| Fourth tier | 1 | 1963–64 |
| Fifth tier | 1 | 1997–98 |
