= Hapoel Kiryat Malakhi F.C. =

Hapoel Kiryat Malakhi
- Full name: Hapoel Kiryat Malakhi Football Club הפועל קרית מלאכי
- Founded: 1954
- Dissolved: 1999
- Ground: Kiryat Malakhi Stadium, Kiryat Malakhi
- 1999–2000: Liga Gimel Central, 12th
Home colours	Away colours

Hapoel Kiryat Malakhi (Hebrew: הפועל קרית מלאכי) was an Israeli football club based in Kiryat Malakhi.

== History ==
The club was founded in 1954 and joined Liga Gimel at the 1954–55 season, the last season in which Liga Gimel was the third tier of Israeli football league system.

In 1959, the club was promoted to the new third tier, Liga Bet, after that league was expanded to 64 teams, divided in 4 divisions. However, the club's spell in Liga Bet lasted one season only, after they finished the 1959–60 season at the bottom of the South B division and dropped back to Liga Gimel.

In the 1963–64 season, the club won Liga Gimel South A division and made a return to Liga Bet, where they spent most of their football seasons, in the South B division. Hapoel were relegated to Liga Gimel at the end of the 1974–75 season, but made an immediate return to Liga Bet, which became the fourth tier, following the creation of Liga Artzit in 1976.

In the 1984–85 season, the club won Liga Bet South B division and achieved historic promotion to Liga Alef, where they spent 12 successive seasons at the South division, unable to achieve promotion to Liga Artzit. Hapoel were relegated to Liga Bet, after finished at bottom of the South division in the 1996–97 season. In the 1998–99 season, after major financial problems, the club withdrew after the 15th round, and had its results nullified, which resulted in automatic relegation to Liga Gimel, the lowest tier of Israeli football. After then mayor of Kiryat Malakhi, Lior Katzav, refused to fund an arbitration award against the club of 18,000 NIS, the Israel Football Association ceased the club's activity, and all the club's results for the 1999–2000 season were resulted in forfeit losses.

== Honours ==
=== League ===
Honour	No.	Years
Fourth tier	3	1963–64, 1975–76, 1984–85
