= Hapoel Ashdod F.C. =

Israeli football club

Hapoel Ashdod
- Full name: Hapoel Ashdod Football Club
- Nickname: The Reds
- Founded: 1957; 2015 (Re-established)
- Dissolved: 1999 (Original club, merged with Ironi Ashdod). 2025
- Ground: Yud-Alef Stadium, Ashdod
- Capacity: 7,800
- Chairman: Merav Ayash
- League: Liga Alef South
- 2024–25: Liga Alef South, 9th of 16
Home colours	Away colours

Hapoel Ashdod F.C. (Hebrew: הפועל אשדוד) is an Israeli football club based in Ashdod. In 1999, it merged with local rivals Ironi Ashdod to create F.C. Ashdod.

In 2015, the club was resurrected by its fans.

== History ==
=== Original club ===
The club was founded in 1957 and reached the second tier after winning Liga Bet South B Division in the 1970–71 season. After several lower-table finishes, the club was relegated to Liga Alef at the end of the 1978–79 season, in which they finished bottom. They returned to the second division at the end of the 1989–90 season, in which they won the southern division of Liga Alef, beating local rivals Maccabi Ironi Ashdod to the title by a single point. They narrowly avoiding relegation in 1993–94, when they finished one place above the relegation zone, but after several more lower-table finishes, in 1997–98 the club finished third, one place below promotion to the top division, but the following season finished tenth, and were due to be relegated two divisions due to financial problems. However, the club merged with Maccabi Ironi Ashdod, to form F.C. Ashdod.

In 2001 a new club, Hapoel Namal Ashdod was established, playing in Liga Gimel. Although the club was initially successful, winning its division and gaining promotion to Liga Bet, at the end of the 2003–04 season, in which it finished fourth, it was disbanded.

=== Re-established club ===
In March 2015, fans of Hapoel Ashdod gathered and re-established the club, with the purpose of joining Liga Gimel in the 2015–16 season.

Later on that month, F.C. Ashdod's chairman, Jacky Ben-Zaken, decided to rename F.C. Ashdod to Hapoel Ashdod and to play in red shirts, following a dispute with fans of the previous club, Maccabi Ironi Ashdod. Despite warnings from the Israel Football Association, which informed the club that such changes during season are illegal, F.C. Ashdod did show up for their Bottom playoff match against Hapoel Ra'anana in red shirts, with the caption "F.C. Hapoel Ashdod", and was eventually disciplined. However, Hapoel Ashdod fans have decided that the club will be registered in Liga Gimel, rather than joining forces with Ben-Zaken's F.C. Ashdod.

At the same time, another group of Hapoel Ashdod fans, headed by lawyer Ya'akov Shitrit, formed a second club, due to play in 2015–16 Liga Gimel. As Shitrit's group was affiliated with the Hapoel organization, this club was registered in the IFA under the name Hapoel Bnei Ashdod (Hebrew:הפועל בני אשדוד), while the fans' club was forced to drop the name Hapoel from their club and registered under the name of Agudat Sport Ashdod (Hebrew: אגודת ספורט אשדוד), (or in short Hebrew: א.ס. אשדוד, Aleph Samekh Ashdod, lit. A.S. Ashdod).

On 18 September 2015 the club played it first official match, beating F.C. Tzeirei al-Hoshla 6–0 in the first round of the State Cup. The club's first manager, former Hapoel Tel Aviv player Moris Zano led the club through its first matches, but was fired in October 2015. In December 2015, the club signed Pini Balili as its new manager.

== Current squad ==
As of 30 October 2024

No.	Pos.	Nation	Player
1	GK	ISR	Amit Shugel
2	DF	ISR	Noy Haddad
3	DF	ISR	Liroy Revivo
4	DF	ISR	Liad Abutbul
5	DF	ISR	Oshri Tadela
7	FW	ISR	Sagi Ohana
10	FW	ISR	Rom Alyagon
11	FW	ISR	Mishel Khoury
12	MF	ISR	Diego Hananya
14	MF	ISR	Shahar Shpaier
15	MF	ISR	Netanel Bitton
16	MF	ISR	Yossi Mekonen

No.	Pos.	Nation	Player
17	DF	ISR	Khaled Zaid
18	GK	ISR	Roy Beigel
19	MF	ISR	Evyatar Bitton
21	DF	ISR	Avihay Zasano
23	DF	ISR	Lucas Umansky
25	DF	ISR	Benel Edri
26	DF	ISR	Elad Ashram
27	MF	ISR	Elad Shabi
30	MF	ISR	Gilad Malka
33	MF	ISR	Ofek Elimelech
55	DF	ISR	Amit Kodman

== Honours ==
=== League ===
Honour	No.	Years
Third tier	2	1970–71, 1989–90
Fourth tier	1	1963–64, 1986–87

== Notable former managers ==
- Gili Landau (born 1958)

== See also ==
- Ashdod football derby
- Hapoel Ashdod players
- Hapoel Bnei Ashdod
