= Hapoel Beit Eliezer F.C. =

Hapoel Beit Eliezer
- Full name: Hapoel Beit Eliezer Football Club מועדון כדורגל הפועל בית אליעזר
- Founded: 1952; 1981
- Dissolved: 1979; 2000
- League: Liga Gimel Sharon division
- 1999–2000: 9th

Hapoel Beit Eliezer Football Club (Hebrew: מועדון כדורגל הפועל בית אליעזר) was an Israeli football club based at the Beit Eliezer neighborhood of Hadera, Israel.

== History ==
The club was established in 1952 and played in the lower division until it won its Liga Gimel division in 1964, after which the club played in Liga Bet for 12 seasons. In 1977, the first season in which Liga Bet was a fourth tier league, following the creation of Liga Artzit as second tier, the club won the league and was promoted to Liga Alef. However, due to financial difficulties the club tried to merge with Hapoel Nahliel, and as the merger fell through, the club folded.

In 1981, the club was re-established and was placed in sixth tier Liga Dalet. The club made two successive promotions in 1982 and 1983 back to Liga Bet. In 1991 the club was on the verge of promotion to Liga Alef, but lost in the final match of the season to promotion rival Hapoel Givat Olga and remained in Liga Bet. Later in the decade, the club relegated back to Liga Gimel, where it played until it was merged with Hapoel Hadera in 2000. An attempt to revive the club, which was made in 2011, fell through.

== Honours ==
=== League ===
Honour	No.	Years
Fourth tier	2	1963–64, 1976–77
Sixth tier	1	1981–82
