= Beitar Dov Netanya F.C. =

Beitar Dov Netanya
- Full name: Beitar Dov Netanya Football Club בית"ר דב נתניה
- Founded: 1957 (as Beitar Beit Lid); 1964
- Dissolved: 1979
- League: Liga Gimel Shomron
- 1978–79: n/a

Beitar Dov Netanya (Hebrew: בית"ר דב נתניה) was an Israeli football club based in Shikun Vatikim in Netanya, after it was relocated from nearby Beit Lid. The club was named after Dov Gruner.

== History ==
The club was founded in 1957 as Beitar Beit Lid in Beit Lid, a Ma'abara (temporary immigrant camp) near Netanya and played in Liga Gimel for two seasons, finishing second in its first season and winning its division in its second season. The club played for four seasons in Liga Bet before dropping back to Liga Gimel. However, the club won its division in the following season, bouncing back to Liga Bet. During the summer break the club moved to Netanya and was renamed Beitar Dov Vatikim Netanya. After a season, the club dropped the word "Vatikim" (seniors) from its name.

The club played in third tier Liga Bet until the end of the 1975–76 season, when Liga Artzit was introduced as the new second division, demoting Liga Bet to fourth tier. At the end of the next season, the club finished 13th and relegated to Liga Gimel, where it played until 1979. The club was bought by the Kfar Yona local council and moved to Kfar Yona, where it played under the name Beitar Kfar Yona. The club won the Sharon division of Liga Gimel in 1985–86 and was promoted to Liga Bet, where it played until it was relegated at the end of the 1997–98 season. After another season in Liga Gimel the club folded.

== Honours ==
=== League ===
Honour	No.	Years
Fourth tier	2	1958–59^{1}, 1963–64^{1}
Fifth tier	1	1985–86^{2}

^{1} As Beitar Beit Lid ^{1} As Beitar Kfar Yona
