= Maccabi Be'er Sheva F.C. =

Israeli football club

Maccabi Be'er Sheva
- Full name: Maccabi Be'er Sheva Football Club מועדון כדורגל מכבי באר שבע
- Nickname(s): Yellow Foxes
- Founded: 1950; 75 years ago
- Owner: Ilan Ramot, Chuk Chaziza
- Chairman: Nir Hazut
- Manager: Uri Hikli
- League: Liga Bet South B
- 2024–25: Liga Bet South B, 13th
Home colours	Away colours

Maccabi Be'er Sheva Football Club (Hebrew: מועדון כדורגל מכבי באר שבע) is an Israeli football team based in Be'er Sheva. The club previously played home matches at the Vasermil Stadium.

== History ==
While not nearly as popular as their city rivals, Hapoel Be'er Sheva, Maccabi Be'er Sheva made great strides in recent years including gaining promotion in juit has suffered two subsequent relegations and then a promotion, in which it jumped from Liga Alef to Liga Leumit, due to the closure of Liga Artzit, and played three seasons more in Liga Leumit, until relegation in the 2011–12 season to Liga Alef, the third tier of Israeli football.

In 2013–14, Maccabi Be'er Sheva finished 14th in Liga Alef South, and relegated to Liga Bet following a defeat of 0–1 to Hapoel Hod HaSharon in the promotion/relegation play-offs. It was eventually reprieved from relegation, after Ironi Bat Yam, which has played in Liga Alef South, folded during the summer. In the following season, the club finished 15th and automatically relegated to Liga Bet.

== Women's section ==
The women's team of Maccabi Be'er Sheva plays in the highest national league, the Ligat Nashim Rishona. It was the runner-up in the 2009–10 Israeli Women's Cup.
