= List of Hapoel Kfar Saba F.C. seasons =

This is a list of seasons played by Hapoel Kfar Saba Football Club in Israeli and European football, from 1939–40 (when the club first competed in the league) to the most recent completed season. It details the club's achievements in major competitions, and the top scorers for each season. Top scorers in bold were also the top scorers in the Israeli league that season. Records of minor competitions such as the Lilian Cup are not included due to them being considered of less importance than the State Cup and the Toto Cup.

== History ==
Hapoel Kfar Saba was established in 1928 and played friendlies until joining Liga Gimel in the 1939–40 season. The club first qualified for the top division at the end of the 1951–52 season and played in the two top divisions ever since, except for one season in the third division. The club won one championship in 1981–82 and three cups.

== Seasons ==
Season	League									State Cup	League Cup	International (Asia/Europe)	Top goalscorer (Note: Goals in all competitions (Liga Leumit or Liga Al, State Cup, Toto Cup and European) are counted.)	
Season	Division	P	W	D	L	F	A	Pts	Pos	State Cup	League Cup	International (Asia/Europe)	Name	Goals
1939–40	Gimel Samaria (3)								2nd (Note: The club participated in a promotion play-offs to Liga Bet with Samaria division winners, Maccabi Kfar Saba and the two top teams from the south division, Hakoah Rishon LeZion and HaMa'avir Tel Aviv. In the play-offs, which were played as a double-robin tournament, Hapoel Kfar Saba was placed first and was promoted.)	–	–	–		
1940–41	–	–	–	–	–	–	–	–	–	–	–	–		
1941–42	Bet North (2)	5	0	0	5	2	17	0	– (Note: The club withdrew from the league and its results were annulled.)	–	–	–		
1942–43	–	–	–	–	–	–	–	–	–	–	–	–		
1943–44	–	–	–	–	–	–	–	–	–	–	–	–		
1944–45	–	–	–	–	–	–	–	–	–	–	–	–		
1945–46	–	–	–	–	–	–	–	–	–	–	–	–		
1946–47	Bet South (2)	16	10	2	4	63	22	22	3rd	–	–	–		
1947–48	Bet South (2) (Note: The 1947–48 league was abandoned due to the 1948 Arab–Israeli War.)	4	2	0	2	4	4	4	7th	–	–	–		
1948–49	–	–	–	–	–	–	–	–	–	– (Note: The 1949 cup competition was delayed by appeals after the completion of the quarter-finals. After settling the appeals three further matches were played in February 1951, and the competition was abandoned.)	–	–		
1949–50	Meuhedet Sharon (2)	16	10	0	6	41	24	20	4th	–	–	–		
1950–51	–	–	–	–	–	–	–	–	–	–	–	–		
1951–52	Bet South (2)	26	20	3	3	90	30	43	1st	QF	–	–		
1952–53	–	–	–	–	–	–	–	–	–	QF	–	–		
1953–54	Alef (1)	26	8	1	13	27	38	17	10th	QF	–	–		
1954–55	Alef (1)	26	6	6	14	38	46	18	12th (Note: The club played a relegation/promotion against 11th placed Beitar Jerusalem and the two top placed teams from 1954–55 Liga Bet, Maccabi Jaffa and Hapoel Kiryat Haim. In the play-offs, which were played as a single round-robin tournament, Hapoel Kfar Saba finished second, securing another season in the top division.)	R3	–	–		
1955–56	Leumit (1)	22	3	6	13	20	48	12	12th	–	–	–		
1956–57	Alef (2)	22	16	0	6	62	26	32	1st (Note: The IFA ordered the top five placed clubs to play a promotion playoffs. Hapoel Kfar Saba finished first in the playoffs and was promoted to Liga Leumit.)	QF	–	–		
1957–58	Leumit (1)	22	6	3	13	30	45	15	12th	R6	–	–		
1958–59	Leumit (1)	22	3	2	17	21	50	8	12th	Round of 16	R1	–		
1959–60	Alef (2)	26	10	6	10	40	39	26	6th	R6	–	–		
1960–61	Alef (2)	26	13	5	8	50	39	31	4th	R6	–	–		
1961–62	Alef (2)	26	7	8	11	39	55	22	10th		–	–		
1962–63	Alef (2)	30	11	7	12	41	41	28 (Note: No points were awarded for a match between Hapoel Kfar Saba and Maccabi Ramla which was disrupted by an on-field brawl.)	7th	Round of 16	–	–		
1963–64	Alef North (2)	26	10	6	10	40	30	26	5th	R2	–	–		
1964–65	Alef North (2)	30	16	6	8	46	29	38	3rd	R4	–	–		
1965–66	Alef North (2)	30	20	3	7	62	37	43	2nd	R5	–	–		
1966–67	Alef North (2)	60	45	11	4	150	45	101	1st	R6	–	–		
1967–68	Alef North (2)	60	45	11	4	150	45	101	1st	R5	–	–		
1968–69	Leumit (1)	30	9	10	11	34	40	28	7th	R6	Group	–		
1969–70	Leumit (1)	30	7	14	9	27	32	28	13th	SF	–	–		
1970–71	Leumit (1)	30	8	13	9	30	24	29	9th	Round of 16	–	–		
1971–72	Leumit (1)	30	6	15	9	26	32	27	9th	R6	–	–		
1972–73	Leumit (1)	30	7	17	6	31	27	31	6th	Round of 16	Group	–		
1973–74	Leumit (1)	30	10	11	9	31	26	31	8th	Round of 16	–	–		
1974–75	Leumit (1)	30	9	11	10	30	34	29	10th	Winners	–	–		
1975–76	Leumit (1)	34	11	14	9	35	27	36	5th	SF	–	–		
1976–77	Leumit (1)	30	6	13	11	37	41	25	14th	QF	–	–		
1977–78	Artzit (2)	26	14	7	5	39	22	35	3rd	QF	–	–		
1978–79	Leumit (1)	30	9	11	10	38	41	29	10th	Round of 16	–	–		
1979–80	Leumit (1)	30	10	11	9	30	26	31	7th	Winners	–	–		
1980–81	Leumit (1)	30	9	10	11	34	36	28	13th	Round of 16	–	–		
1981–82	Leumit (1)	30	17	8	5	45	28	42	1st	R7	–	–		
1982–83	Leumit (1)	30	6	12	12	33	40	30	16th	R7	–	–		
1983–84	Artzit (2)	30	14	10	6	43	19	52	2nd	R6	–	–		
1984–85	Leumit (1)	30	6	15	9	26	33	33	11th	SF	Group	–		
1985–86	Leumit (1)	30	11	9	10	41	34	42	6th	QF	Group	–		
1986–87	Leumit (1)	30	11	9	10	44	40	42	8th	QF	Group	–		
1987–88	Leumit (1)	33	11	12	10	33	31	45	6th	R8	Group	–		
1988–89	Leumit (1)	33	10	11	12	33	38	41	10th	Round of 16	Group	–		
1989–90	Leumit (1)	32	10	6	16	28	41	36	6th	Winners	Group	–		
1990–91	Leumit (1)	32	6	8	18	30	55	26	12th	R8	Group	–		
1991–92	Artzit (2)	30	13	9	8	41	32	48	4th	R7	Group	–		
1992–93	Artzit (2)	30	15	9	6	49	27	54	3rd	R7	Group	–		
1993–94	Leumit (1)	39	7	11	21	36	64	32	14th	Round of 16	Group	–		
1994–95	Artzit (1)	30	13	9	8	46	32	48	2nd	QF	Group	–		
1995–96	Leumit (2)	30	8	4	18	29	53	28	12th	R8	Final	–		
1996–97	Leumit (1)	30	11	7	12	34	39	40	8th	QF	Group	–		
1997–98	Leumit (1)	30	10	8	12	39	39	38	6th	Round of 16	SF	–		
1998–99	Leumit (1)	30	11	6	13	47	66	39	8th	QF	Group	–		
1999–2000	Premier (1)	39	8	14	17	40	56	38	12th	SF	R2	–		
2000–01	Leumit (2)	38	13	12	13	48	40	50 (Note: Hapoel Kfar Saba had 1 point deducted.)	8th	R8	QF	–		
2001–02	Leumit (2)	33	18	9	6	57	23	63	1st	R8	R2	–		
2002–03	Premier (1)	33	7	5	21	43	81	23 (Note: Hapoel Kfar Saba had 3 points deducted.)	11th	Round of 16	Group	–		
2003–04	Leumit (2)	33	14	12	7	45	32	53 (Note: Hapoel Kfar Saba had 1 point deducted.)	4th	R8	Group	–		
2004–05	Leumit (2)	33	15	11	7	40	27	56	1st	R9	Final	–		
2005–06	Premier (1)	33	8	10	15	30	41	34	10th	QF	Group	–		
2006–07	Premier (1)	33	8	16	9	41	40	40	8th	Round of 16	Final	–	Samuel Yeboah	18
2007–08	Premier (1)	33	9	10	14	37	54	37	11th	QF	Group	–	Samuel Yeboah	17
2008–09	Leumit (2)	33	8	12	13	34	41	36	8th	QF	Group	–	Guy Dayan	7
2009–10	Leumit (2)	35	16	9	10	56	47	32 (Note: Hapoel Kfar Saba scored 51 points in the regular season, which were halved at the beginning of the play-offs. The club scored 6 more points during the play-offs for a total of 57 points.)	3rd (Note: Hapoel Kfar Saba played a promotion/relegation play-off match against the 14th placed club in the Premier League, Hapoel Ramat Gan, and lost 0–1, remaining in Liga Leumit.)	R8	Group	–	Shlomi Azulay	15
2010–11	Leumit (2)	35	20	9	6	54	36	36 (Note: Hapoel Kfar Saba scored 66 points in the regular season, which were halved at the beginning of the play-offs. The club scored 3 more points during the play-offs for a total of 69 points.)	3rd (Note: Hapoel Kfar Saba played a promotion/relegation play-off (as home and away matches) against the 14th placed club in the Premier League, Hapoel Petah Tikva, and lost 1–5 on aggregate, remaining in Liga Leumit.)	R8	QF	–	Patrick Doeplah	10
2011–12	Leumit (2)	33	12	10	11	42	34	26 (Note: Hapoel Kfar Saba scored 41 points in the regular season, which were halved at the beginning of the play-offs. The club scored 5 more points during the play-offs for a total of 46 points.)	7th	Round of 16	Group	–	Ran Itzhak	14
2012–13	Leumit (2)	37	10	11	16	37	45	32 (Note: Hapoel Kfar Saba had 9 points deducted for entering administration.)	16th	Round of 16	Group	–	Guy Melamed	12
2013–14	Alef North (3)	30	18	9	3	57	21	63	1st	Round of 16	–	–	Michael Kirtava	17
2014–15	Leumit (2)	37	21	10	6	61	28	73	2nd	QF	QF	–	Ran Itzhak	17
2015–16	Premier (1)	33	9	11	13	23	37	38	10th	QF	Group	–	Ran Itzhak	6
2016–17	Premier (1)	26	4	9	13	17	34	21	12th	R7	Group	–		

== Key ==
- P = Played
- W = Games won
- D = Games drawn
- L = Games lost
- F = Goals for
- A = Goals against
- Pts = Points
- Pos = Final position
- Leumit = Liga Leumit (National League)
- Artzit = Liga Artzit (Nationwide League)
- Premier = Liga Al (Premier League)
- Pal. League = Palestine League
- F = Final
- Group = Group stage
- QF = Quarter-finals
- QR1 = First Qualifying Round
- QR2 = Second Qualifying Round
- QR3 = Third Qualifying Round
- QR4 = Fourth Qualifying Round
- RInt = Intermediate Round
- R1 = Round 1
- R2 = Round 2
- R3 = Round 3
- R4 = Round 4
- R5 = Round 5
- R6 = Round 6
- SF = Semi-finals

Champions	Runners-up	Promoted	Relegated
