= 1951–52 Israel State Cup =

Tournament details
- Country: Israel

Final positions
- Champions: Maccabi Petah Tikva (2nd title)
- Runners-up: Maccabi Tel Aviv

The 1951–52 Israel State Cup (Hebrew: גביע המדינה, Gvia HaMedina) was the 16th season of Israel's nationwide football cup competition and the first after the Israeli Declaration of Independence.

The final was held at the Basa Stadium on 7 June 1952, between Maccabi Tel Aviv and Maccabi Petah Tikva, and latter won 1–0 to win its second cup.

== Results ==
=== First round ===
14 of the 15 Liga Gimel (3rd tier) clubs which had registered to play in the cup competed in the first round (the 15th, Hapoel Beit Oren received a bye to the second round). Matches were held on 24 November 1951.

Home team	Score	Away team
Hapoel Givat Aliyah	2–1	Hapoel Migdal-Gad
Hapoel Be'er Sheva	1–0	Beitar Jaffa
Hapoel Mahane Yehuda	w/o (Note: Hapoel Mahane Yehuda originally won the match 9–1.)	Beitar Rishon LeZion
Hapoel Acre	w/o (Note: Maccabi Tiberias originally won the match 3–0.)	Maccabi Tiberias
Ahvat Notzrim Haifa	7–0	Hapoel Nahliel
Homenetmen Haifa	1–7	Hapoel Beit Lid
Hapoel Mishmar HaShiv'a	4–0	Hapoel Tirat Hacarmel

Bye: Hapoel Beit Oren

=== Second round ===
All 28 Liga Bet (2nd tier) clubs joined the 8 Liga Gimel club, qualified from the first round. Matches were played on 8 December 1951. The replays were played on 5 January 1952, after a few Saturdays of torrential rain, which prevented any football activity.

Home team	Score	Away team
Maccabi Sha'arayim	w/o	Hapoel Balfouria
Maccabi Ramat Gan	6–0	Maccabi Jerusalem
Hapoel Hadera	11–0	Beitar Rishon LeZion
Beitar Netanya	0–11	Hapoel Ra'anana
Maccabi Zikhron Ya'akov	w/o	Hapoel Beit Oren
Hapoel Kiryat Haim	4–1	Hapoel Givat Aliyah
Maccabi Jaffa	6–2	Degel Yehuda Haifa
Hapoel Beit Lid	2–2 (a.e.t.)	Hapoel Kfar Saba
Hapoel Mishmar HaShiv'a	w/o	Ahvat Notzrim Haifa
Hapoel Acre	3–3 (a.e.t.)	Hapoel Rehovot
Hapoel Herzliya	w/o	Hakoah Tel Aviv
Bnei Yehuda	3–2	Beitar Jerusalem
Hapoel Netanya	4–0	Maccabi Hadera
Hapoel Jaffa	w/o	Hakoah Haifa
Maccabi Nes Tziona	0–4 (a.e.t.)	Hapoel HaNamal Haifa
Hapoel Jerusalem	5–2	S.C. Atlit
Hapoel Kfar Ata	3–5	Hapoel Be'er Sheva
Hapoel Zikhron Ya'akov	0–0 (a.e.t.)	Hapoel Dror Haifa

==== Replays ====
Home team	Score	Away team
Hapoel Kfar Saba	2–1	Hapoel Beit Lid
Hapoel Rehovot	5–3	Hapoel Acre
Hapoel Dror Haifa	1–2	Hapoel Zikhron Ya'akov

=== Third round ===
The 18 qualified teams were joined by the 12 Liga Alef clubs. Most matches were held on 26 January 1952, with three, of Maccabi Tel Aviv, Hapoel Tel Aviv and Maccabi Petah Tikva postponed to 16 February 1952, since players of these clubs were with an IDF XI team on a tour in Cyprus.

Home team	Score	Away team
Hapoel Haifa	3–1	Beitar Tel Aviv
Maccabi Haifa	1–2 (a.e.t.)	Maccabi Ramat Gan
Hapoel Jerusalem	0–1	Hapoel HaNamal Haifa
Maccabi Jaffa	6–0	Hapoel Be'er Sheva
Hapoel Ra'anana	0–10	Maccabi Rehovot
Bnei Yehuda	1–5	Hapoel Rehovot
Hapoel Ramat Gan	3–0	Hapoel Netanya
Hapoel Petah Tikva	1–0	Hapoel Balfouria
Hapoel Rishon LeZion	5–1	Ahvat Notzrim Haifa
Hapoel Hadera	2–3	Maccabi Rishon LeZion
Hapoel Zikhron Ya'akov	1–0	Hakoah Haifa
Hapoel Kfar Saba	3–1	Maccabi Zikhron Ya'akov
Maccabi Tel Aviv	w/o	Maccabi Netanya
Hapoel Tel Aviv	2–1	Hapoel Kiryat Haim
Maccabi Petah Tikva	5–1	Hakoah Tel Aviv

=== Fourth round ===
The 15 qualifiers from the third round were divided into 7 ties, with Maccabi Rishon LeZion receiving a bye to the quarter-finals. Matches were played on 23 February 1952, with the tie between Hapoel Haifa and Hapoel Tel Aviv going into a double replay, played on 1 March 1952 and 8 March 1952. The second replay between the teams were abandoned midway through the second half, with Hapoel Tel Aviv leading 2–0, after a Hapoel player was sent off, and the crowd stormed the pitch. The IFA ordered the teams to play the 23 minutes left in the game on a neutral pitch. Hapoel Haifa appealed the decision, and when the appeal was denied, resigned from the competition.

Home team	Score	Away team
Hapoel Haifa	0–0 (a.e.t.)	Hapoel Tel Aviv
Hapoel Ramat Gan	2–1	Maccabi Ramat Gan
Maccabi Rehovot	0–2	Hapoel Petah Tikva
Hapoel Rishon LeZion	0–3	Maccabi Tel Aviv
Hapoel HaNamal Haifa	4–0	Hapoel Zikhron Ya'akov
Hapoel Rehovot	1–5	Maccabi Petah Tikva
Hapoel Kfar Saba	6–2	Maccabi Jaffa

Bye: Maccabi Rishon LeZion

==== Replay ====
Home team	Score	Away team
Hapoel Tel Aviv	1–1 (a.e.t.)	Hapoel Haifa

==== Second Replay ====
Home team	Score	Away team
Hapoel Tel Aviv	2–0 (f)	Hapoel Haifa

=== Quarter-finals ===
Matches were played on 8 March 1952, except for the tie between Hapoel Tel Aviv and Hapoel Ramat Gan, which was delayed until the fourth round tie between Hapoel Tel Aviv and Hapoel Haifa was resolved, and played on 12 April 1952.

Home team	Score	Away team
Hapoel Petah Tikva	5–0	Maccabi Rishon LeZion
Hapoel HaNamal Haifa	0–2	Maccabi Tel Aviv
Maccabi Petah Tikva	5–0	Hapoel Kfar Saba
Hapoel Tel Aviv	5–0	Hapoel Ramat Gan

=== Semi-finals ===
The first semi-final, between Hapoel Petah Tikva and Maccabi Tel Aviv was played on 22 March 1952. The second was delayed for over two months and was finally played on 24 May 1952.

Home team	Score	Away team
Hapoel Petah Tikva	1–7	Maccabi Tel Aviv
Maccabi Petah Tikva	1–0	Hapoel Tel Aviv

=== Final ===
7 June 1952

Maccabi Tel Aviv	0–1	Maccabi Petah Tikva
		Carmeli 55'

Basa Stadium, Tel Aviv
Attendance: 12,000
Referee: Schneider
