= 1953–54 Israel State Cup =

Tournament details
- Country: Israel

Final positions
- Champions: Maccabi Tel Aviv (7th Title)
- Runners-up: Maccabi Netanya

The 1953–54 Israel State Cup (Hebrew: גביע המדינה, Gvia HaMedina) was the 17th season of Israel's nationwide football cup competition and the second after the Israeli Declaration of Independence.

The competition started in March 1953, after yet another agreement ending a rift between the Hapoel and Maccabi factions in the IFA, and the first rounds were played as a part of the 1952–53 Israeli football season. The competition continued during the 1953–54 season.

The final was held at the Basa Stadium in Tel Aviv on 3 July 1954. Maccabi Tel Aviv defeated Maccabi Netanya 4–0 and won its seventh cup.

== Results ==
=== First round ===
10 of the 11 Liga Gimel (3rd tier) clubs which had registered to play in the cup competed in the first round. Matches were due to be held on 21 March 1953. However, only one match, between Beitar Haifa and Hapoel Acre was held, and the rest were played in early April 1953.

Home team	Score	Away team
Hapoel Acre	1–0	Beitar Haifa
Hapoel Even Yehuda	2–1	Beitar Netanya
Hapoel Kiryat Ono	1–1	Oichman Jaffa
Beitar Jaffa	6–0	Beitar Ramla
Maccabi Shmuel Tel Aviv	4–1	Hapoel el-Amal Lod

Bye: Kadima Jaffa

=== Second round ===
26 teams from Liga Bet joined the six qualifiers from the first round. Matches were played on 18 April 1953.

Home team	Score	Away team
Bnei Yehuda	2–1	Maccabi Ramat Gan
Maccabi Jaffa	4–3 (a.e.t.)	Hapoel Hadera
Hapoel Dror Haifa	0–3	Ahvat Notzrim Haifa
Maccabi Zikhron Ya'akov	w/o	Hapoel Mishmar HaShiv'a
Hapoel Acre	w/o	Maccabi Hadera
Hapoel Kiryat Ono	w/o	Hapoel Netanya
Hapoel Rishon LeZion	2–1	Kadima Jaffa
Hapoel Even Yehuda	2–1	Degel Yehuda Haifa
Hapoel Mahane Yehuda	w/o (Note: Hapoel Mahane Yehuda won the match 2–1 Originally.)	Maccabi Sha'arayim
Maccabi Shmuel Tel Aviv	1–2	Hapoel Rehovot
Hapoel Nahariya	5–1	Hakoah Haifa
Hapoel Ra'anana	4–4 (a.e.t.)	Hapoel Jerusalem
S.C. Atlit	2–1	Hapoel Herzliya
Beitar Jaffa	1–2	Hapoel Kiryat Haim
Maccabi Jerusalem	5–1	Maccabi Rishon LeZion
Beitar Jerusalem	w/o	Hakoah Tel Aviv

=== Third round ===
The 12 teams of Liga Alef entered the competition. Matches were held on 2 May 1953. Maccabi Tel Aviv and Maccabi Jerusalem required a replay, which was delayed and was finally played on 12 September 1953.

Home team	Score	Away team
Beitar Tel Aviv	3–1	Maccabi Sha'arayim
Beitar Jerusalem	2–1	Bnei Yehuda
Hapoel Tel Aviv	6–0	Hapoel Even Yehuda
Maccabi Jaffa	2–3 (a.e.t.)	Hapoel Rishon LeZion
S.C. Atlit	0–6	Maccabi Haifa
Maccabi Petah Tikva	7–2	Hapoel Rehovot
Hapoel Nahariya	1–3 (a.e.t.)	Hapoel Jerusalem
Hapoel Kiryat Haim	4–2	Ahvat Notzrim Haifa
Maccabi Rehovot	0–3	Hapoel Ramat Gan
Maccabi Netanya	1–0	Hapoel Mishmar HaShiv'a
Hapoel Haifa	11–1	Hapoel Netanya
Hapoel Petah Tikva	7–1	Maccabi Hadera
Hapoel Kfar Saba	w/o	Hapoel Balfouria
Maccabi Tel Aviv	3–3 (a.e.t.)	Maccabi Jerusalem

==== Replay ====
Home team	Score	Away team
Maccabi Jerusalem	0–4	Maccabi Tel Aviv

=== Fourth round ===
The final 14 teams met in this round, which matches were played on 14 November 1953, except for the match between Hapoel Tel Aviv and Maccabi Petah Tikva, which was postponed to 9 January 1954. Both teams requested the postponement as they had major players injured after the Israel's 1954 FIFA World Cup qualification matches at Greece and Yugoslavia.

The match between Hapoel Jerusalem and Hapoel Petah Tikva was abandoned at the 60th minute due to weather conditions and was replayed on 12 December 1953.

Maccabi Tel Aviv were on the brink of elimination, as they were losing 1–2 at Hapoel Kiryat Haim, before scoring a 90th-minute equalizer, and winning the match in extra time.

Home team	Score	Away team
Beitar Tel Aviv	0–2	Maccabi Haifa
Hapoel Haifa	3–1	Hapoel Rishon LeZion
Hapoel Kiryat Haim	2–3 (a.e.t.)	Maccabi Tel Aviv
Hapoel Jerusalem	0–3; Abandoned	Hapoel Petah Tikva
Hapoel Tel Aviv	2–1	Maccabi Petah Tikva
Hapoel Kfar Saba	2–1	Beitar Jerusalem
Hapoel Ramat Gan	0–1 (a.e.t.)	Maccabi Netanya

==== Replay ====
Home team	Score	Away team
Hapoel Jerusalem	1–2 (a.e.t.)	Hapoel Petah Tikva

=== Quarter-finals ===
In early March 1954, Israel played the 1954 FIFA World Cup qualification return home matches against Yugoslavia and Greece, and then went on a two-month tour of South Africa. After the return of the national team, the quarter-final matches were played on 29 May 1954.

Home team	Score	Away team
Maccabi Netanya	4–3 (a.e.t.)	Hapoel Kfar Saba
Maccabi Haifa	1–2	Hapoel Haifa
Hapoel Tel Aviv	0–1	Maccabi Tel Aviv

Bye: Hapoel Petah Tikva

=== Semi-finals ===
Both matches were played on 5 June 1954.

Home team	Score	Away team
Maccabi Netanya	2–1	Hapoel Haifa
Hapoel Petah Tikva	1–2	Maccabi Tel Aviv

=== Final ===
3 July 1954

Maccabi Tel Aviv	4–0	Maccabi Netanya
Halivner 32'; Glazer 73', 76'; Studinski 74'

Basa Stadium, Tel Aviv
Attendance: 4,000
Referee: Kario
