= 1953–54 in Israeli football =

Football in Israel
- Season: 1953–54

Men's football
- Liga Alef: Maccabi Tel Aviv
- Liga Bet: Haopel Hadera; Beitar Jerusalem
- State Cup: Maccabi Tel Aviv

The 1953–54 season was the sixth season of competitive football in Israel and the 28th season under the Israeli Football Association, established in 1928, during the British Mandate.

== IFA competitions ==
=== League competitions ===
Competition		Winner	Promotion	Relegated
Liga Alef		Maccabi Tel Aviv		(Note: No club was relegated as the league was expanded from 12 to 14 clubs.)
Liga Bet	North	Hapoel Hadera		Degel Yehuda Haifa; Hapoel Dror Haifa
Liga Bet	South	Beitar Jerusalem		Hapoel Herzliya; Hapoel Mishmar HaShiva
Liga Gimel			Hapoel Beit Lid; Hapoel Acre; Beitar Jaffa; YMCA Jerusalem	

=== 1953–54 Israel State Cup ===
The competition took place between 21 March 1953 and 3 July 1954. Maccabi Tel Aviv beaten Maccabi Netanya 4–0 in the final.

== National Teams ==
=== National team ===
==== 1954 World Cup qualification (Group 10) ====
Pos	Team	Pld	W	D	L	GF	GA	GD	Pts	Yugoslavia national football team	Greece national football team	Israel national football team
1	Yugoslavia	4	4	0	0	4	0	+4	8	—	1–0	1–0
2	Greece	4	2	0	2	3	2	+1	4	0–1	—	1–0
3	Israel	4	0	0	4	0	5	−5	0	0–1	0–2	—

==== 1953–54 matches ====
1 November 1953 1954 FIFA World Cup qualification	Greece	1–0	Israel	Athens
	Bembis 52'	Report		Stadium: Leoforos Alexandras Stadium; Attendance: 22,000; Referee: (Italy) Massai

8 November 1953 1954 FIFA World Cup qualification	Yugoslavia	1–0	Israel	Skopje
	Milutinović 3'	Report		Stadium: Gradski Stadium; Attendance: 30,000; Referee: (Belgium) Alsteen

8 March 1954 1954 FIFA World Cup qualification	Israel	0–2	Greece	Ramat Gan
		Report	Kokkinakis 61'; Kamaras 83'	Stadium: Ramat Gan Stadium; Attendance: 55,000; Referee: (Italy) Pieri

21 March 1954 1954 FIFA World Cup qualification	Israel	0–1	Yugoslavia	Ramat Gan
	Zebec 80'	Report		Stadium: Ramat Gan Stadium; Attendance: 55,000; Referee: (England) Leafe

1 May 1954 Friendly	South Africa	2–1	Israel	Johannesburg
	Warren 40'; Roos 53'		Glazer 42'	Stadium: Rand Stadium; Attendance: 22,000; Referee: (South Africa) Cable

==== 1953 Maccabiah Games ====
The national team represented Israel in the 1953 Maccabiah Games, competing against other 6 teams of Jewish footballers. Israel won all its matches, scoring 27 goals and conceding just one goal, and won the gold medal.
