= 1947–48 Liga Bet =

Israeli football season

The 1947-48 Liga Bet was the abandoned second tier season of league football in the British Mandate for Palestine. The league started in October 1947 and was abandoned in January 1948 due to the difficulty of holding regular league fixtures during the 1947–48 Civil War in Mandatory Palestine.

== League tables (as of 3 January 1948) ==
=== North Division ===
Pos	Team	Pld	W	D	L	GF	GA	GR	Pts
1	Hapoel Hadera	3	3	0	0	11	2	5.500	6
2	Maccabi Zikhron Ya'akov	3	3	0	0	13	4	3.250	6
3	Hapoel Netanya	4	2	2	0	13	5	2.600	6
4	Hakoah Haifa	3	2	1	0	6	1	6.000	5
5	Hapoel Kiryat Haim	3	2	0	1	12	6	2.000	4
6	Maccabi Hadera	4	1	2	1	6	6	1.000	4
7	S.C. Atlit	3	1	1	1	9	7	1.286	3
8	Hapoel Balfouria	2	1	0	1	7	7	1.000	2
9	Hapoel Kfar Ata	4	1	0	3	5	10	0.500	2
10	Degel Yehuda Haifa	3	1	0	2	5	13	0.385	2
11	Hapoel Dror Haifa	1	0	0	1	1	2	0.500	0
12	Brit Poalei Eretz Yisrael Haifa	3	0	0	3	3	15	0.200	0
13	Nordia Netanya	4	0	0	4	0	13	0.000	0

Updated to match(es) played on 3 January 1948. Source: Aspaklaria Shel HaSport (The Sport Mirror), p. 3,

=== South Division ===
Pos	Team	Pld	W	D	L	GF	GA	GR	Pts
1	Maccabi Ramat Gan	5	5	0	0	18	3	6.000	10
2	Nordia Jerusalem	3	3	0	0	17	6	2.833	6
3	Hakoah Tel Aviv	4	3	0	1	14	6	2.333	6
4	Degel Zion Tel Aviv	6	2	1	3	11	16	0.688	5
5	Hapoel Rehovot	3	2	0	1	12	5	2.400	4
6	Hapoel Jerusalem	3	2	0	1	7	4	1.750	4
7	Hapoel Kfar Saba	4	2	0	2	4	7	0.571	4
8	Maccabi HaTzafon	4	1	1	2	4	7	0.571	3
9	Dan Tel Aviv	5	1	1	3	8	13	0.615	3
10	Hapoel Ra'anana	4	1	1	2	4	12	0.333	3
11	Hapoel Herzliya	4	1	0	3	2	14	0.143	2
12	Maccabi Gedera	4	0	0	4	6	14	0.429	0

Updated to match(es) played on 3 January 1948. Source: Aspaklaria Shel HaSport (The Sport Mirror), p. 3,
