= 1951–52 in Israeli football =

Football in Israel
- Season: 1951–52

Men's football
- Liga Alef: Maccabi Tel Aviv
- Liga Bet: Hapoel Balfouria; Hapoel Kfar Saba
- State Cup: Maccabi Petah Tikva

The 1951–52 season was the fourth season of competitive football in Israel and the 26th season under the Israeli Football Association, established in 1928, during the British Mandate.

== Review and Events ==
- In September 1951, Hapoel Tel Aviv conducted a tour of England, playing against Arsenal (losing 1–6), Manchester United (losing 0–6) and Leeds United (losing 0–2).
- In April 1952, Maccabi Tel Aviv departed on a tour of Turkey. Maccabi played Hacettepe, winning 1–0, Ankara Demirspor, winning 3–0, Ankaragücü, losing 2–3, Gençlerbirliği, losing 0–2 and Fenerbahçe, drawing 1–1.
- On 30 April 1952, Independence Day, the annual Jerusalem Cup was contested for the second time. The teams competing for the cup were selected XI from different cities. In the cup semi-finals, played on 19 April 1952, Jerusalem XI had beaten Haifa XI 4–3 and Petah Tikva XI defeated Ramat Gan XI 3–1. In the final, played at YMCA Stadium in Jerusalem, Petah Tikva XI won 5–0.
- In May 1952 work began on Kiryat Haim Stadium.

== IFA Competitions ==
=== League competitions ===
Competition		Winner	Promotion	Relegated
Liga Alef		Maccabi Tel Aviv		Hapoel Rishon LeZion; Maccabi Rishon LeZion
Liga Bet	North	Hapoel Balfouria		Hapoel Kfat Ata; Hapoel HaNamal Haifa (Note: Hapoel Dror Haifa was reprieved from relegation as the IFA expelled from Liga Bet following as its players rioted during a match against Hakoach Haifa.)
Liga Bet	South	Hapoel Kfar Saba		Maccabi Nes Tziona; Hapoel HaNamal Jaffa
Liga Gimel			Hapoel Nahariya; Ahva Notzrit Haifa; Hapoel Mahane Yehuda; Hapoel Mishmar HaShiva	

=== 1951–52 Israel State Cup ===
The competition took place between 24 November 1951 and 7 June 1952. Maccabi Petah Tikva beaten Maccabi Tel Aviv 1–0 in the final.

== National Teams ==
=== National team ===
No matches were played by the national team during the season.
