= 1951–52 Liga Bet =

Israeli football season

The 1951–52 Liga Bet season saw Hapoel Balfouria (champions of the North Division) and Hapoel Kfar Saba (champions of the South Division) promoted to Liga Alef. Hapoel Kfar Ata of the North Division, Maccabi Nes Tziona and Hapoel HaNamal Jaffa of the South Division were all relegated. Hapoel HaNamal Haifa relegated following suspension, whilst Beitar Netanya and Hapoel Zikhron Ya'akov both withdrew from the league during season. thus, also relegated to Liga Gimel.

== Participating teams ==
All active teams that have played in the aborted 1947–48 Liga Bet were invited to join the league. 11 teams from the North Division (Hapoel Balfouria, Hapoel Hadera, Hakoah Haifa, Hapoel Netanya, Hapoel Kiryat Haim, Maccabi Zikhron Ya'akov, Degel Yehuda Haifa, S.C. Atlit, Maccabi Hadera, Hapoel Dror Haifa and Hapoel Kfar Ata) and 8 teams from the South Division (Hapoel Kfar Saba, Maccabi Ramat Gan, Hakoah Tel Aviv, Hapoel Jerusalem, Hapoel Rehovot, Beitar Jerusalem, Hapoel Ra'anana and Hapoel Herzliya) have done so. Maccabi Nes Tziona, who finished bottom of the 1949–50 Israeli League was placed in the South Division.

To fill in the vacancies, one club from the Liga Meuhedet Samaria Division (Hapoel HaNamal Haifa, who finished second in the division) was placed in the North Division to complete a 12-team line-up, and three teams from Liga Meuhedet Tel Aviv Division (Bnei Yehuda, Hapoel Jaffa and Maccabi Jaffa, who finished first, second and third in the division) and two from Jerusalem-South division (Maccabi Sha'arayim and Maccabi Jerusalem, who finished 3rd and 4th in the division) were placed in the South division to complete a 14-team line-up.

== North Division ==
Pos	Team	Pld	W	D	L	GF	GA	GD	Pts	Promotion or relegation
1	Hapoel Balfouria	22	19	2	1	52	18	+34	40	Promoted to Liga Alef
2	Hapoel Hadera	22	18	2	2	80	14	+66	38	
3	Hakoah Haifa	22	12	1	9	55	35	+20	25	
4	Hapoel Netanya	22	11	3	8	57	42	+15	25	
5	Hapoel Kiryat Haim	22	12	0	10	43	38	+5	24	
6	Hapoel HaNamal Haifa (Note: Hapoel HaNamal Haifa demoted from Liga Bet, due to riot in their match against Hakoah Haifa.)	22	11	0	11	46	45	+1	22	Relegated to Liga Gimel
7	Maccabi Zikhron Ya'akov	22	9	2	11	47	52	−5	20	
8	Degel Yehuda Haifa	21	9	0	12	54	67	−13	18	
9	Sport Club Atlit	22	7	4	11	33	49	−16	18	
10	Maccabi Hadera	21	7	1	13	31	48	−17	15	
11	Hapoel Dror Haifa	22	6	1	15	31	68	−37	13	
12	Hapoel Kfar Ata	22	1	0	21	17	67	−50	2	Relegated to Liga Gimel

== South Division ==
Pos	Team	Pld	W	D	L	GF	GA	GD	Pts	Promotion or relegation
1	Hapoel Kfar Saba	26	20	3	3	90	30	+60	43	Promoted to Liga Alef
2	Maccabi Ramat Gan	26	17	5	4	64	27	+37	39	
3	Hakoah Tel Aviv	26	16	5	5	76	29	+47	37	
4	Hapoel Jerusalem	26	17	3	6	56	27	+29	37	
5	Hapoel Rehovot	26	14	5	7	66	46	+20	33	
6	Maccabi Jaffa	26	11	7	8	51	39	+12	29	
7	Bnei Yehuda	26	11	6	9	40	34	+6	28	
8	Beitar Jerusalem	26	11	5	10	45	50	−5	27	
9	Maccabi Jerusalem	26	10	2	14	45	53	−8	22	
10	Hapoel Ra'anana	26	7	4	15	47	62	−15	18	
11	Maccabi Sha'arayim	26	5	5	16	38	63	−25	15	
12	Hapoel Herzliya	26	5	4	17	24	71	−47	14	
13	Maccabi Nes Tziona	26	4	5	17	17	67	−50	13	Relegated to Liga Gimel
14	Hapoel HaNamal Jaffa	26	3	3	20	26	91	−65	9	Relegated to Liga Gimel
