= 1953–54 Liga Bet =

Israeli football season

The 1953–54 Liga Bet season saw Hapoel Hadera (champions of the North Division) and Beitar Jerusalem (champions of the South Division) promoted to Liga Alef.

Degel Yehuda Haifa and Hapoel Dror Haifa were both relegated from the North Division. Hapoel Herzliya and Hapoel Mishmar HaShiv'a were both relegated from the South Division, whilst Maccabi Rishon LeZion collapsed and withdrew from the league.

== North Division ==
Pos	Team	Pld	W	D	L	GF	GA	GD	Pts	Promotion or relegation
1	Hapoel Hadera	20	19	0	1	81	17	+64	38	Promoted to Liga Alef
2	Hapoel Kiryat Haim	20	17	1	2	58	14	+44	35	
3	Sport Club Atlit	20	10	2	8	39	33	+6	22	
4	Ahva Notzrit Haifa	20	9	3	8	46	46	0	21	
5	Hapoel Nahariya	20	9	2	9	43	47	−4	20	
6	Hapoel Netanya	20	9	2	9	40	50	−10	20	
7	Maccabi Hadera	20	9	1	10	47	47	0	19	
8	Hakoah Haifa	20	7	2	11	37	40	−3	16	
9	Maccabi Zikhron Ya'akov	20	7	0	13	38	54	−16	14	
10	Degel Yehuda Haifa	20	6	1	13	37	51	−14	13	Relegated to Liga Gimel
11	Hapoel Dror Haifa	20	1	0	19	12	79	−67	2	Relegated to Liga Gimel

== South Division ==
Pos	Team	Pld	W	D	L	GF	GA	GD	Pts	Promotion or relegation
1	Beitar Jerusalem	26	20	2	4	76	26	+50	42	Promoted to Liga Alef
2	Hapoel Rehovot	26	17	6	3	87	32	+55	40	
3	Hakoah Tel Aviv	26	17	0	9	82	39	+43	34	
4	Hapoel Jerusalem	26	15	3	8	75	36	+39	33	
5	Hapoel Rishon LeZion	26	14	4	8	65	36	+29	32	
6	Maccabi Jaffa	26	13	5	8	65	39	+26	31	
7	Maccabi Sha'arayim	26	10	5	11	48	50	−2	25	
8	Maccabi Jerusalem	26	10	4	12	57	64	−7	24	
9	Maccabi Ramat Gan	26	7	8	11	40	46	−6	22	
10	Hapoel Ra'anana	26	7	7	12	43	73	−30	21	
11	Hapoel Mahane Yehuda	26	7	5	14	40	55	−15	19	
12	Bnei Yehuda	26	7	5	14	33	58	−25	19	
13	Hapoel Herzliya	26	4	6	16	30	89	−59	14	Relegated to Liga Gimel
14	Hapoel Mishmar HaShiv'a	26	1	3	22	16	114	−98	5	Relegated to Liga Gimel
