= 1950–51 in Israeli football =

Football in Israel
- Season: 1950–51

Men's football
- State Cup: incomplete

The 1950–51 season was the third season of competitive football in Israel and the 25th season under the Israeli Football Association, established in 1928, during the British Mandate.

During this season not league football was played, as Hapoel and Maccabi factions in the IFA argued over the composition of the top division, and whether to include Maccabi Nes Tziona in Liga Alef. The disagreement was settled towards the end of the season, allowing league operation to renew at the start of the next season.

== IFA Competitions ==
=== 1949–51 Israel State Cup ===
After almost 2 years of deliberations, a decision was finally given in Maccabi Petah Tikva's appeal over their elimination in the quarter-finals, and a rematch against Hapoel Tel Aviv was set. However, after the completion of the quarter-finals, and playing 3 out of the 4 matches of the semi-finals, the competition was abandoned.

== Non-IFA competitions ==
As IFA-organized competitions were suspended, each faction organized its own competition. Hapoel organized a two-tier league honouring the 30th anniversary of the Histadrut. The senior competition, contested by Hapoel Tel Aviv, Hapoel Jerusalem, Hapoel Ramat Gan, Hapoel Rishon LeZion, Hapoel Petah Tikva and Hapoel Haifa, was won by Hapoel Tel Aviv, with Hapoel Petah Tikva finishing as runners-up. The second tier was split into North and South regional divisions, won by Hapoel Namal Haifa and Hapoel Rehovot, respectively.
Maccabi organized a cup competition called President Cup, won by Maccabi Tel Aviv, followed by a cup competition called "Yad LaAsara" (lit. memorial to the ten, after 10 Maccabi members who fell during the 1948 Arab–Israeli War). This competition was abandoned as the dispute in the IFA was settled and the league restored.

== National Teams ==
=== National team ===
==== 1950–51 matches ====
28 October 1950 Friendly	Israel	5–1	Turkey	Tel Aviv
				Stadium: Maccabiah Stadium

3 December 1950 Friendly	Turkey	3–2	Israel	Istanbul

==== 1950 Maccabiah Games ====
The national team represented Israel in the 1950 Maccabiah Games and played four matches against teams from South Africa, United Kingdom, France and Switzerland. The team won all four matches and the gold medal for the event.
