= Jabaliya (disambiguation) =

Jabaliya, Jabalya, or Jabalia may refer to:

== Places ==
- Jabalia, North Gaza, Gaza Strip, Palestine
  - Jabalia refugee camp
- Jabaliya, Misau, Misau, Bauchi, Nigeria; see List of villages in Bauchi State
- Jabalya, Tofu, Misau, Bauchi, Nigeria; see List of villages in Bauchi State
- Giv'at Aliyah (also called Jabalya), Jaffa, Tel Aviv, Israel

== Other uses ==
- Jabaliya, a genre of Tétouan music found in Tétouan, Morocco
