= 1929 Palestine Cup =

Tournament details
- Country: Mandatory Palestine
- Teams: 18

Final positions
- Champions: Maccabi Tel Aviv
- Runners-up: Maccabi Hasmonean Jerusalem

Tournament statistics
- Matches played: 18
- Goals scored: 75 (4.17 per match)

The 1929 Palestine Cup (Hebrew: הגביע הא"י, HaGavi'a HaEretz-Israeli) was the second season of Israeli Football Association's nationwide football cup competition. The joint-winners of the previous competition were Hapoel Tel Aviv and Maccabi Hasmonean Jerusalem.

Maccabi Tel Aviv won the cup, beating Maccabi Hasmonean Jerusalem 4–0 in the final, which was held on Maccabi Petah Tikva ground.

For the first (and penultimate) time, teams were allowed to enter reserve teams into the competition. However, only Maccabi Tel Aviv took advantage of this, and its B "Nordia" team reached the quarter-finals, before falling to Maccabi Zikhron Ya'akov after a replay.

== Results ==
=== First round ===
The draw for the first and the second rounds was held in mid-November 1928. The matches were supposed to be played on 1 December 1928, however, the match between Maccabi Tel Aviv and PGH was postponed to 15 December 1928, and was played on Hapoel Tel Aviv ground.

Home team	Score	Away team
Wireless Sarafand	6–0	Gaza Bedouins
Maccabi Tel Aviv	1–0	P.G.H. Sarafand

=== Second round ===
Second round matches started on 5 January 1929 with Maccabi Tel Aviv narrowly beating a Royal Air Force team of the 14th squadron, stationed in Amman and the previous year's cup final winner (and cup joint-holders) Hapoel Tel Aviv surprisingly losing to a British military team from the Royal Corps of Signals, stationed in Sarafand in Extra time. Hapoel Tel Aviv appealed the result, claiming that according to the competition rules the match shouldn't have gone to extra time, but to a replay, however, the appeal was rejected and Hapoel's elimination was confirmed. The tie between the Arab team St. George and Maccabi Petah Tikva went to a replay after a 3–3 draw in Petah Tikva. In Jerusalem the Arab team won 2–1 and progressed to the quarter-finals.

Home team	Score	Away team
Hapoel Haifa	4–0	Hapoel Jerusalem
Maccabi Tel Aviv	4–3	RAF Amman
Maccabi Zikhron Ya'akov	5–0	Maccabi Tiberias
Maccabi Hasmonean Jerusalem	w/o	Maccabi Hadera
Wireless Sarafand	2–0 (a.e.t.)	Hapoel Tel Aviv
Maccabi Avshalom Petah Tikva	3–3 (a.e.t.)	St. George
Maccabi "Nordia" Tel Aviv	2–1	Transjordan Frontier Force
Maccabi HaGibor Haifa	0–2	British Police

==== Replay ====
Home team	Score	Away team
St. George	2–1	Maccabi Avshalom Petah Tikva

=== Quarter-finals ===
Matches were played on 2 February 1929, except for the match between Hapoel Haifa and Wireless Sarafand, which was postponed due to weather conditions and was played on 16 February 1929. The match between Maccabi "Nordia" Tel Aviv and Maccabi Zikhron Ya'akov went into a replay, which was played on 16 February 1929. The match was abandoned at the 65th minute due to the waterlogged pitch, with Maccabi Zikhron Ya'akov leading 2–1, and the result was confirmed as final.

Home team	Score	Away team
Maccabi Tel Aviv	3–1	British Police
Maccabi "Nordia" Tel Aviv	1–1 (a.e.t.)	Maccabi Zikhron Ya'akov
Maccabi Hasmonean Jerusalem	4–2	St. George
Hapoel Haifa	3–0	Wireless Sarafand

==== Replay ====
Home team	Score	Away team
Maccabi Zikhron Ya'akov	2–1	Maccabi "Nordia" Tel Aviv

=== Semi-finals ===
2 March 1929

Maccabi Hasmonean Jerusalem	2–0	Hapoel Haifa
Linenberg 70'; Simmons 85'	Do'ar HaYom

Maccabi Tel Aviv ground
Attendance: 6000
Referee: McEnroe

23 March 1929

Maccabi Zikhron Ya'akov	2–9	Maccabi Tel Aviv

Maccabi Petah Tikva ground

=== Final ===
30 March 1929

Maccabi Hasmonean Jerusalem	0–4	Maccabi Tel Aviv
	Davar	Zelivanski 4', 83'; Berger 69' (Pen.); Zvi 81'

Maccabi Petah Tikva ground
Attendance: 3000
Referee: Stollery

== See also ==
- 1928–29 in Mandatory Palestine football
