= Willy Berger =

Israeli footballer (1906–1986)

Willy Berger וילי ברגר
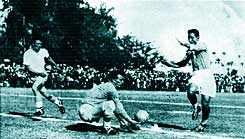
- Berger (middle) trying to stop Mahmoud Mokhtar El Tetsh (right) during the match against Egypt in the 1934 World Cup qualifiers

Personal information
- Full name: Willy Ze'ev Berger
- Date of birth: 17 January 1906
- Place of birth: Hungary
- Date of death: 1 July 1986 (aged 80)
- Place of death: Israel
- Position: Goalkeeper

Youth career
- 1922–23: 33 FC
- 1923–25: MTK Hungaria

Senior career*
Years	Team	Apps	(Gls)
1925–1926	VAC		
1927	Maccabi Tiberias		
1927–1928	Hapoel Tel Aviv		
1928–1930	Maccabi Tel Aviv		
1930–1937	Hapoel Tel Aviv		
1937–1946	Maccabi Petah Tikva		
1946–1950	Hakoah Tel Aviv		

International career
1934	Eretz Israel	2	(0)

Managerial career
- 1927: Maccabi Tiberias
- * Club domestic league appearances and goals

Willy Ze'ev Berger (Hebrew: וילי ברגר; 17 January 1906 – 1 July 1986) was an Israeli footballer who played as a goalkeeper for Maccabi Tel Aviv, Hapoel Tel Aviv, Maccabi Petah Tikva and Hakoah Tel Aviv and for Eretz Israel football team

== Club career ==
Berger was born in Hungary and played football as youth, appearing for the national schoolboys team, where he was first played as goalkeeper, filling in for an injured teammate. Berger played as youth with 33 FC and MTK Hungaria and joined the first team of VAC. In 1927 Berger was contacted to play with Maccabi HaGibor Haifa on its tour if the USA, but eventually Berger was dropped from the tour and settled in Tiberias, where he played and coached the local Maccabi team. After several months, Berger was asked to join the newly reformed Hapoel Tel Aviv, to which he agreed. With Hapoel Tel Aviv he won the first Palestine Cup competition. Berger returned to Maccabi Tel Aviv the following season, and once again won the cup, scoring a goal in the final.

In 1930, Berger returned to Hapoel Tel Aviv and stayed with the club until 1937, winning two league championships and two cups. After 1937, Berger played with Maccabi Petah Tikva and Hakoah Tel Aviv, before retiring in 1950.

== International career ==
Berger was picked as goalkeeper for the first national team, playing against Egypt in the 1934 World Cup qualification. The national team lost to Egypt 7–1, but Berger's performance was praised.

== Honours ==
Hapoel Tel Aviv

- Palestine League: 1933–34, 1934–35
- Israel State Cup: 1928, 1934, 1937

Maccabi Tel Aviv

- Israel State Cup: 1929
- Magen Shimshon: 1925, 1926
