= HaKochav Lod F.C. =

HaKochav Lod
- Full name: HaKochav Lod Football Club
- Founded: 1954
- Dissolved: 1956
- Ground: Lod Municipal Stadium, Lod
- 1955–56: Liga Gimel Central, 7th

HaKochav Lod (Hebrew: הכוכב לוד) was an Israeli football club based in Lod. The club, based in the Turkish Jews community in Lod, existed for two seasons before folding, its players joining Hapoel Lod. In its two years of existence, HaKochav finished 12th (out of 14) and 7th (out of 8) in the Central division of Liga Gimel.
