= Maccabi Tiberias F.C. =

Maccabi Tiberias
- Full name: Maccabi Tiberias Football Club מועדון כדורגל מכבי טבריה
- Founded: 1925
- Dissolved: 1990s
- Ground: Tiberias Municipal Stadium

Maccabi Tiberias Football Club (Hebrew: מועדון כדורגל מכבי טבריה) was an Israeli football club based at Tiberias. The club was founded in 1925, the first football club established in Tiberias. It was dissolved in the 1990s.

== History ==
The club was founded in 1925, and had its ground opened on 13 October 1927. The club participated in the Second Edition of the Palestine Cup, but due to its remoteness and the hardship of travelling during the British Mandate the club had to settle to playing local sides and didn't take part in IFA competitions until after the Israeli Declaration of Independence.

The best years of the club in the Israeli league were during the mid-1970s, when the club made it to the third tier, Liga Bet and played in this level for three seasons, until the league system was reconstructed and the Liga Artzit was added at the second tier, making Liga Bet the fourth tier. The club played in the lower tiers until it was dissolved in the 1990s.

The club shares the Israeli record for biggest margin of victory in an Israel State Cup match, a record obtained on 8 October 1983, when it beat Hapoel Sajur 24–1 in the 1983–84 Israel State Cup, tying Maccabi Zikhron Ya'akov record of 25–2.

== Honours ==
- Liga Gimel
  - Champions (1): 1972–73
