= Tiberias Municipal Stadium =

Football stadium in Tiberias, Israel

- איצטדיון עירוני טבריה
- Interactive map of Tiberias Municipal Stadium
- Full name: Tiberias Municipal Football Stadium
- Location: Tiberias, Israel
- Coordinates: 32°47′49.3″N 35°31′16.1″E
- Owner: Municipality of Tiberias
- Operator: Municipality of Tiberias
- Surface: Grass

Construction
- Opened: 30 March 1958

Tenants
- Hapoel Tiberias (1958–1994); Maccabi Tiberias (1958–1990s); Beitar Tiberias (1958–2001); Ironi Tiberias (2001–2014, 2015–)

Tiberias Municipal Stadium (Hebrew: האצטדיון העירוני של טבריה), is a football stadium in Tiberias.

== History ==
The Municipal Stadium is the second football stadium built in Tiberias, after the defunct Maccabi Tiberias Ground, which was opened in 1927, and was in use until the early 1950s, when the IFA deemed the ground unfit, leading the Tiberias clubs to play their matches in nearby settlements, with Hapoel Tiberias, playing in third division Liga Bet forced to host its home matches in Kibbutz Ma'agan. The stadium was opened on 28 March 1958 with a match between Hapoel Tiberias and Hapoel Haifa

The stadium hosted first division football during Hapoel Tiberias two stints in Liga Leumit, between 1961 and 1965 and in 1988–89, before which a second stand was built on the east side of the ground with plastic seats. The ground hosted its final top division match on 26 May 1989, against Hapoel Tel Aviv, in which Hapoel Tiberias won 4–1.

Following the closure of both Hapoel Tiberias and Maccabi Tiberias, Beitar Tiberias remained the only tenant in the stadium, playing in Liga Bet and Liga Gimel throughout the 1990s. Beitar merged in 2001 with nearby club Hapoel Mo'atza Ezorit Galil Tahton, to form Hapoel Galil Tahton/Tiberias. The merged club changed its name to Ironi Tiberias in 2007 and played its Liga Alef matches at the ground until 2014, when the club promoted to Liga Leumit and was forced to host its matches in Afula Illit Stadium, as the ground was deemed to be unfit to second division football by the IFA. Following the club relegation back to Liga Alef at the end of the season, the club returned to host matches in the ground.

== Planned closure ==
In 2014, the Municipality of Tiberias announced plans to build a new stadium for the city which will be located in the hills above the city, near the junction of Poriya Hospital as a part of a sports complex also including a multi-purpose 2,500-seat sports hall, a training ground and a swimming pool. Following the inauguration of the new stadium, the ground is supposed to be demolished and built over.
