= 1928–29 in Mandatory Palestine football =

Football in Mandatory Palestine
- Season: 1928–29

The 1928–29 season was the second season of competitive football in the British Mandate for Palestine under the Eretz Israel Football Association, which was established during the previous season. The latest matches of the season were played on 17 August 1929, during the preceding stages of the 1929 Palestine riots, including a match which was interrupted by rioting rabble. During the riots all sport activities were cancelled and the next football match, which opened the next season, was played on 14 September 1929.

== IFA Competitions ==
=== 1929 Palestine Cup ===
The second Palestine Cup saw 18 teams competing for the cup. previous season's finalist (and joint-winner), Maccabi Hasmonean Jerusalem made it to the final for a second year in a row, but was beaten by Maccabi Tel Aviv 4–0.

30 March 1929

Maccabi Hasmonean Jerusalem	0–4	Maccabi Tel Aviv
		4', 83' Zelivanski; 69' (pen.) Berger; 81' Zvi

Maccabi Petah Tikva ground
Attendance: 3000
Referee: Stollery

== Minor Cups and Leagues ==
=== Tel Aviv District Cup ===
This cup was contested by six teams, playing in a double round-robin league format. Three of the teams, Maccabi Tel Aviv, Hapoel Tel Aviv and Maccabi Avshalom Petah Tikva were Jewish teams, and three, RAF Ramla, Wireless Sarafand and PGH Sarafand, were British military teams. The competition was won by Maccabi Tel Aviv, although it was never completed. The British teams withdrew after seven rounds of play, and the final round match between leaders Maccabi Tel Aviv and second-placed Maccabi Avshalom Petah Tikva wasn't played as Petah Tikva failed to show to the match.

Pos	Team	Pld	W	D	L	GF	GA	GR	Pts	MTA	MPT	PGH	RAF	HTA	WIR
1	Maccabi Tel Aviv	9	8	1	0	24	6	4.000	17	—	3–0 (Note: The league committee set up the match as a championship decider. As Maccabi Petah Tikva failed to show to the match, the committee awarded the match and the title to Maccabi Tel Aviv.)	4–1	3–2	1–0	5–1
2	Maccabi Petah Tikva	7	5	0	2	14	9	1.556	10	1–2	—		4–1	4–1	1–0
3	Palestine General Hospital	8	4	1	3	12	15	0.800	9		0–1	—	2–2	1–0	2–0
4	RAF Ramla	9	2	3	4	19	20	0.950	7	1–1		6–0	—	3–1	1–2
5	Hapoel Tel Aviv	10	3	0	7	18	19	0.947	6	0–2	2–3	1–2	6–2	—	5–0
6	Wireless Sarafand	9	1	1	7	6	24	0.250	3	0–3		1–4	1–1	1–2	—

Updated to match(es) played on 6 April 1929. Source: Ha'Aretz

=== Jerusalem Cup ===
This cup was contested by five teams, playing in a double round-robin league format. Maccabi Hasmonean Jerusalem's senior team won the cup.

Pos	Team	Pld	W	D	L	GF	GA	GR	Pts	MHA	STG	POL	MHB	HJE
1	Maccabi Hashmonai A	8	6	2	0	23	5	4.600	14	—	2–2	2–1	4–0	7–1
2	St. George	8	4	2	2	25	8	3.125	10	1–1	—	3–4	4–0	5–0
3	Police XI	7	5	0	2	18	11	1.636	10	0–3	1–0	—	(Note: The match between Police XI and Maccabi Hasmonean B wasn't played, as its result couldn't affect the cup winner.)	3–2
4	Maccabi Hashmonai B	7	0	2	5	4	16	0.250	2	0–2	0–2	1–3	—	1–1
5	Hapoel Jerusalem	8	0	2	6	6	36	0.167	2	1–4	0–8	0–7	2–2	—

Updated to match(es) played on 6 April 1929. Source: Ha'Aretz

=== Nashashibi Cup ===
This cup was a knock-out competition named after Raghib al-Nashashibi, mayor of Jerusalem. The cup was won by Hapoel Jerusalem.

==== Quarter-finals ====
Home team	Score	Away team
Hapoel Jerusalem	2–0	Maccabi Balfour
Maccabi HaSemel	6–0	Maccabi HaGibor
St. George	2–2; 2–0	Hapoel Yona

==== Semi-finals ====
Home team	Score	Away team
Hapoel Jerusalem	4–1	British Police B
St. George	4–3	Maccabi HaSemel

==== Final ====
Home team	Score	Away team
Hapoel Jerusalem	2–1	St. George

=== Other Cups ===
==== Jaffa Mayor Cup ====
This cup was contested in a single match on 30 March 1929 between Hapoel Tel Aviv and an Islamic Sports Club from Jaffa. Hapoel won the match and the cup 5–1.

==== Mr. Guth Cup ====
This cup was contested in a single match by Maccabi Hasmonean and a select team from the Palestine Police Force. The match, played on 16 March 1929 ended in a 1–1 draw and a replay was arranged. A replay, arranged for 6 April 1929 ended goalless, and a third match, played on 14 April 1929 was won by the British Police 3–1.

== Notable events ==
- On 29 and 30 September 1928 the Hapoel organization held the first Hapoel Games in Tel Aviv. Three football matches were played during the event, in which Hapoel Jerusalem have beaten a team composed of footballers from Zikhron Ya'akov, Binyamina, and Hadera 1–0, and a team composed of footballers from Netanya, Kfar Saba, Ra'anana and Herzliya 3–0, while a match between Hapoel Tel Aviv and Hapoel Haifa was abandoned at the 63rd minute due to the late hour, with Haifa leading 2–1.
- On 20 October 1928, Maccabi Avshalom Petah Tikva celebrated the opening of its ground. During the celebrations a football match was played between the hosts and a British military team from Sarafand and Ramla, the hosts winning 3–1.
- In early November 1928 Hapoel Bnei Brak was formed. The club was a minor club and played mostly in third tier before the Declaration of Independence. In 1954 the club merged with Hapoel Kiryat Ono. The club played its first match on 22 December 1928, against Hapoel Petah Tikva.
- A team from the American University of Beirut visited and played four matches against local teams, scoring 3 victories (3–0 over Maccabi Avshalom Petah Tikva, 1–0 over Hapoel Tel Aviv and 2–1 over Arab Team St. George) and 1 loss (0–2 against a select XI from Jerusalem teams of Maccabi Hasmonean and HaSemel).
- On 1 May 1929, Hapoel Tel Aviv embarked on a tour of Syria and Lebanon. Hapoel Played two matches in Beirut, losing both, 1–3 or 2–3 to American College and 3–5 to Al-Nahda. In Damascus, Hapoel played against Barada SC and won 3–2 or 2–1, after which local fans rioted. Hapoel played one match in Aleppo, which it won 1–0.
