= 1949–51 Israel State Cup =

1949–1951 Israel State Cup
Tournament details
- Country: Israel

The 1949–51 Israel State Cup (Hebrew: גביע המדינה, Gvia HaMedina) was to be the sixteenth season of Israeli Football Association's nationwide football cup competition, the first after independence of Israel. However, the competition was never completed.

== Tournament details ==
As the 1948 Arab–Israeli War was fought, starting from the declaration of independence of Israel in May 1948, most civilian operations, including those of the Israeli Football Association were suspended, and only in early 1949, as the military activities dwindled, the IFA resumed operation.

As Israel entered the 1950 FIFA World Cup qualification and matches against Yugoslavia were set to August and September 1949, the IFA were keen to resume league and cup operations. Cup matches were set to start in early April 1949, with the final set to 21 May 1949, with league matches starting a week later. For this edition of the cup teams were set to play two legs, home and away, for each round, except for the final.

Matches started on 9 April 1949, but were brought to a halt on 28 May 1949, after the apparent completion of the quarter-final matches. As Maccabi Tel Aviv and Maccabi Avshalom Petah Tikva appealed their elimination in the quarter-finals, and as 1949–50 Israeli League matches began 28 May 1949, the cup matches did not resume before the end of the 1948–49 football season.

As decision in the appeal of Maccabi Petah Tikva was not given until early 1951, and as disagreements between Hapoel and Maccabi brought the IFA to a stalemate, cup matches did not resume until 3 February 1951. Three further matches were played during February 1951, but no more matches were played and the tournament was abandoned at the end of the 1950–51 football season.

== Results ==
=== First round ===
Team 1	Agg.	Team 2	1st leg	2nd leg
Hapoel Tel Aviv	w/o	Hapoel HaNamal Haifa	–	–
Hapoel Jaffa	5–0	Hapoel Rishon LeZion	3–0	2–0
Hakoah Haifa	3–4	Beitar Tel Aviv	3–4	0–0
Hapoel Haifa	w/o	Beitar Jaffa	7–0	–
Hapoel Ramat Gan	11–3	Beitar Jerusalem	7–0	4–3
Maccabi Avshalom Petah Tikva	3–2	Hapoel Petah Tikva	2–1 (Note: A first match was played between the sides and was abandoned at the 86th minute with Maccabi Avshalom Petah Tikva leading 1–0. The IFA cancelled the result of the first match and a replay was taken.)	1–1
Hapoel Givat Haim	2–6	Hapoel Balfouria	0–3 (Note: The match score was originally a 6–1 win to Hapoel Givat Haim. However, as Hapoel Givat Haim showed to the match without player cards, the match was awarded to Hapoel Balfouria)	2–3 (Note: A match between the sides was played on 23 April 1949 with the score of 1–0 to Hapoel Balfouria. After the match, it was declared as a friendly match and a second one was arranged for the following week.)
Maccabi Rehovot	2–3 (Note: As aggregate score wasn't taken into consideration in determining the tie winner, a third deciding match was set up.)	Maccabi Tel Aviv	2–1	0–2

==== Deciding match ====
Home team	Score	Away team
Maccabi Tel Aviv	8–0	Maccabi Rehovot

=== Quarter-finals ===
Team 1	Agg.	Team 2	1st leg	2nd leg
Hapoel Tel Aviv	5–1	Maccabi Avshalom Petah Tikva	3–1	2–0 (Note: The match was originally set for 14 May 1949. Maccabi Avshalom Petah Tikva didn't show for the match was Hapoel Tel Aviv was given a walkover win. After an appeal the match was set to replay on 3 February 1951.)
Hapoel Ramat Gan	4–3	Hapoel Jaffa	2–1 (Note: The match was abandoned at the 70th minute and the result stood.)	2–2
Hapoel Haifa	10–3	Hapoel Balfouria	8–1	2–2
Beitar Tel Aviv	4–1	Maccabi Tel Aviv	2–1	2–0

=== Semi-finals ===
Team 1	Agg.	Team 2	1st leg	2nd leg
Hapoel Haifa	7–3	Hapoel Ramat Gan	5–1	2–2
Hapoel Tel Aviv	–	Beitar Tel Aviv	1–0	
