= 1946–47 Liga Bet =

Israeli football season

The 1946–47 Liga Bet season was the second tier season of league football in the British Mandate for Palestine. The league covered wider areas as North and South (previously played in smaller regional divisions). This was also the last completed season under the British Mandate for Palestine.

Maccabi Haifa (champions of the North Division) and Hapoel HaTzafon Tel Aviv (champions of the South Division) promoted to the top tier. However, due to outbreak of the 1947–1949 Palestine war, which caused the abandon of the 1947–48 season, they had to wait until the 1949–50 Israeli League season.

Following the Israeli Declaration of Independence, second tier football in Israel rearranged, and most of the participating clubs in the 1946–47 Liga Bet season continued to play in the new Liga Meuhedet (Special League), which became a temporary second division of Israeli football in the 1949–50 season.

== North Division ==
Pos	Team	Pld	W	D	L	GF	GA	GD	Pts	Promotion
1	Maccabi Haifa	24	19	3	2	81	22	+59	41	Promoted to Palestine League
2	Hapoel Netanya	24	19	2	3	72	19	+53	40	
3	Hapoel Hadera	24	14	2	8	68	34	+34	30	
4	Maccabi Zikhron Ya'akov	24	13	3	8	72	39	+33	29	
5	Hapoel Balfouria	24	13	3	8	57	40	+17	29	
6	Sport Club Atlit	24	13	2	9	61	40	+21	28	
7	Beitar Netanya	24	13	2	9	56	40	+16	28	
8	Hapoel Kiryat Haim	24	9	2	13	45	55	−10	20	
9	Maccabi Hadera	24	8	1	15	49	72	−23	17	
10	Hapoel Kfar Ata	24	8	0	16	39	68	−29	16	
11	Hakoah 09 Haifa	24	7	1	16	44	70	−26	15	
12	Degel Yehuda Haifa	24	5	1	18	21	65	−44	11	
13	Brit Poalei Eretz Yisrael Haifa	24	0	0	24	5	106	−101	0	

== South Division ==
Pos	Team	Pld	W	D	L	GF	GA	GD	Pts	Promotion
1	Hapoel HaTzafon Tel Aviv	16	13	3	0	56	15	+41	29	Promoted to Palestine League
2	Hakoah Tel Aviv (Note: Before the start of the season, Hakoah Tel Aviv were due to play at the top tier, whilst Hakoah 09 Tel Aviv were due to play at Liga Bet. However, Hakoah Tel Aviv withdrew from the top tier, and in the following month, merged with Hakoah 09 Tel Aviv. The merged club continued in Liga Bet as Hakoah Tel Aviv.)	16	12	2	2	51	18	+33	26	
3	Hapoel Kfar Saba	16	10	2	4	63	22	+41	22	
4	Maccabi Ramat Gan	16	9	0	7	42	31	+11	18	
5	Maccabi HaTzafon Tel Aviv	16	8	0	8	34	35	−1	16	
6	Maccabi Gedera	16	7	1	8	36	47	−11	15	
7	Hapoel Ra'anana	16	6	0	10	34	35	−1	12	
8	Beitar Ramat Gan	16	2	0	14	17	67	−50	4	
9	Dan Tel Aviv	16	1	0	15	10	73	−63	2	

Notes:

Beitar Jerusalem, Beitar Petah Tikva, Bnei Yehuda Tel Aviv, Degel Zion Tel Aviv, Hapoel Giv'atayim and Hapoel Jerusalem were all included in the South division before the start of the season. Beitar Jerusalem and Degel Zion Tel Aviv withdrew shortly after the season started.
