= Brit Poalei Eretz Yisrael Nazareth F.C. =

- Full name: Brit Poalei Eretz Yisrael Nazareth Football Club ברית פועלי ארץ ישראל חיפה
- Founded: 1949
- Dissolved: 1952
- League: Liga Meuhedet
- 1949–50: 6th (North division)

Brit Poalei Eretz Yisrael Nazareth F.C. (Hebrew: ברית פועלי ארץ ישראל חיפה) was an Arab football club from Nazareth, Israel. The club was organized within Brit Poalei Eretz Yisrael, an Arab Workers Union affiliated with the Histadrut.

The club joined the Liga Meuhedet (lit. 'Special League'), becoming one of the first two Arab clubs in the Israeli football leagues (along with Brit Poalei Eretz Yisrael Haifa). The club finished 6th of its division and folded as the workers union was dissolved.
