= 1954–55 Hapoel Kfar Saba F.C. season =

Hapoel Kfar Saba
1954–55 season
- Manager: Edmond Schmilovich; Emmanuel Scheffer
- Stadium: Hapoel Ground, Kfar Saba
- Liga Alef: not completed
- State Cup: Round 3
- Top goalscorer: League: Haim Glazer (8); All: Haim Glazer (8)

The 1954–55 Hapoel Kfar Saba season was the club's 28th season since its establishment in 1928, and 7th since the establishment of the State of Israel.

During the season, the club competed in Liga Alef (top division) and the State Cup.

== Review and events ==
- On 14 August 1954, the club played the first match of the new season, a friendly match against Hapoel Jerusalem, drawing 3–3.
- The club played one international friendly match during the season, against AC Omonia, on 28 May 1955, losing 1–4.

== Match Results ==
=== Legend ===
Win Draw Loss

=== Liga Alef ===
League matches began on 6 February 1955, and by the time the season, only 20 rounds of matches were completed, delaying the end of the league season to the next season.

==== League table (as of 2 July 1955) ====
Pos	Club	P	W	D	L	GF	GA	GR	Pts
6	Maccabi Haifa	20	8	5	7	36	29	1.24	21
7	Maccabi Netanya	20	7	7	6	39	39	1.00	21
8	Hapoel Kfar Saba	20	6	6	8	29	30	0.97	18
9	Maccabi Rehovot	20	7	4	9	35	37	0.95	18
10	Hapoel Haifa	20	6	6	8	31	35	0.89	18

==== Matches ====
5 February 1955 1	Hapoel Kfar Saba	1–0	Maccabi Haifa	Kfar Saba
	H. Glazer 66'	Report		Stadium: Hapoel Ground; Attendance: 2,000; Referee: Moshe Cohen

12 February 1955 2	Hapoel Petah Tikva	1–1	Hapoel Kfar Saba	Petah Tikva
	Segal 68'	Report (p. 8)	55' H. Glazer	Stadium: Hapoel Ground; Attendance: 1,800; Referee: Levinger

19 February 1955 3	Hapoel Kfar Saba	4–1	Hapoel Hadera	Kfar Saba
	Schmilovich 35' (pen.), 55'; H. Glazer 62' (pen.), 70'	Report (p. 8)	88' Piterman	Stadium: Hapoel Ground; Attendance: 1,500; Referee: Parnas

26 February 1955 4	Hapoel Balfouria	4–4	Hapoel Kfar Saba	Afula
	Gordon 6' (pen.); Levin 14'; Kochavi 47'; Tal 68'	Report (p. 8)	62', 76' Meirman; 65' (pen.), 81' Schmilovich	Stadium: Hapoel Ground; Attendance: 1,000; Referee: Sher

5 March 1955 5	Hapoel Haifa	3–1	Hapoel Kfar Saba	Haifa
	M. Simantiris 33'; Kramer 48'; Shamir 85'	Report (p. 8)	25' Schmilovich	Stadium: Kiryat Haim Stadium; Attendance: 2,000; Referee: Rosenbaum

12 March 1955 6	Hapoel Kfar Saba	2–2	Maccabi Rehovot	Kfar Saba
	Meirman 12'; Avrutski 86'	Report (p. 8)	25' Steuermann; 89' Stein	Stadium: Hapoel Ground; Attendance: 1,000; Referee: Markovich

19 March 1955 7	Hapoel Tel Aviv	0–2	Hapoel Kfar Saba	Tel Aviv
		Report (p. 8)	9' (pen.) Bulman; 64' H. Glazer	Stadium: Basa Stadium; Attendance: 4,000; Referee: Scheindling

2 April 1955 8	Hapoel Kfar Saba	0–2	Maccabi Petah Tikva	Kfar Saba
			34' Scharf; 83' Ben Dror	Stadium: Hapoel Ground; Attendance: 2,000; Referee: Levichter

9 April 1955 9	Beitar Jerusalem	1–0	Hapoel Kfar Saba	Jerusalem
	Elfasi 13'	Report (p. 8)		Stadium: YMCA Stadium; Attendance: 5,000; Referee: Rosenbaum

13 April 1955 10	Hapoel Kfar Saba	1–0	Hapoel Ramat Gan	Kfar Saba
	H. Glazer 34'	Report (p. 4)		Stadium: Hapoel Ground; Attendance: 2,500; Referee: Dudkevich

16 April 1955 11	Maccabi Netanya	1–2	Hapoel Kfar Saba	Netanya
	Y. Spiegel 25'	Report (p. 8)	20' H. Glazer; 40' Bonin	Stadium: Sar-Tov Stadium; Attendance: 2,500; Referee: N. Cohen

23 April 1955 12	Hapoel Kfar Saba	0–0	Maccabi Tel Aviv	Kfar Saba
		Report (p. 8)		Stadium: Hapoel Ground; Attendance: 3,000; Referee: Klein

30 April 1955 13	Beitar Tel Aviv	1–1	Hapoel Kfar Saba	Tel Aviv
	Y. Gambash 58'	Report (p. 8)	86' Tobiash	Stadium: Maccabi Jaffa Ground; Attendance: 3,000; Referee: Sher

14 May 1955 14	Maccabi Haifa	2–1	Hapoel Kfar Saba	Haifa
	Georgiou 18', 71'	Report	69' H. Glazer	Stadium: Kiryat Haim Stadium; Attendance: 3,000; Referee: Ben-Rubi

21 May 1955 15	Hapoel Kfar Saba	0–1	Hapoel Petah Tikva	Kfar Saba
		Report (p. 8)	57' Stelmach	Stadium: Hapoel Ground; Attendance: 3,000; Referee: Parnas

4 June 1955 16	Hapoel Hadera	3–1	Hapoel Kfar Saba	Hadera
	Rubin 9', 28', 67'	Report (p. 8)	74' Avrutski	Stadium: Hapoel Ground; Attendance: 1,500; Referee: Frizner

11 June 1955 17	Hapoel Kfar Saba	6–1	Hapoel Balfouria	Kfar Saba
	Avrutski 1', 70', 78'; Tzahobel 11', 35'; Edelstein 20' (o.g.)	Report (p. 8)	53' Zussmann	Stadium: Hapoel Ground; Attendance: 1000; Referee: Zahavi

19 June 1955 18	Hapoel Kfar Saba	1–2	Hapoel Haifa	Kfar Saba
	Tzahobel 33'	Report (p. 8)	54' Nestenfober; 78' Diamant	Stadium: Hapoel Ground; Attendance: 800; Referee: Hillman

26 June 1955 19	Maccabi Rehovot	4–0	Hapoel Kfar Saba	Rehovot
	Shrager 42', 81'; Litvak 55', 59'	Report (p. 8)		Stadium: Maccabi Ground; Attendance: 1,500; Referee: N. Cohen

3 July 1955 20	Hapoel Kfar Saba	1–1	Hapoel Tel Aviv	Kfar Saba
	Avrutski 17'	Report (p. 8)	60' Rosenbaum	Stadium: Hapoel Ground; Attendance: 1,500; Referee: Fried

==== Results by match ====
Match	1	2	3	4	5	6	7	8	9	10	11	12	13	14	15	16	17	18	19	20
Result	W	D	W	D	L	D	W	L	L	W	W	D	D	L	L	L	W	L	L	D
Position	4	5	3	5	5	4	4	6	6	6	6	6	6	6	6	7	6	8	8	8

Updated to match(es) played on 3 July 1955. Source: 2 Dear Points
W = Win; D = Draw; L = Loss

=== State Cup ===
7 May 1955 Round 3	Maccabi Jerusalem	2–1	Hapoel Kfar Saba	Jerusalem
	Nahari 13'; Yair 45'		59' Sadovski	Stadium: YMCA Stadium
