= Brit Poalei Eretz Yisrael Haifa F.C. =

- Full name: Brit Poalei Eretz Yisrael Haifa Football Club ברית פועלי ארץ ישראל חיפה
- Founded: 1947
- Dissolved: 1952
- League: Liga Meuhedet
- 1949–50: 9th (North division)

Brit Poalei Eretz Yisrael Haifa F.C. (Hebrew: ברית פועלי ארץ ישראל חיפה) was an Arab football club from Haifa, Israel. The club was organized within Brit Poalei Eretz Yisrael, an Arab Workers Union affiliated with the Histadrut.

The club joined the second division in 1946–47, and played in the second division, designated Liga Meuhedet (lit. 'Special League') after the Israeli Declaration of Independence, becoming one of the first two Arab clubs in the Israeli football leagues (along with Brit Poalei Eretz Yisrael Nazareth). The club finished bottom of its division in both seasons it played in the league.
