= Hapoel Mishmar HaShiv'a F.C. =

Israeli football club

Hapoel Mishmar HaShiv'a
- Full name: Hapoel Mishmar HaShiv'a Football Club הפועל משמר השבעה
- Founded: 1950
- Dissolved: 1954
- 1953–54: Liga Bet South, 14th (Relegated)

Hapoel Mishmar HaShiv'a (Hebrew: הפועל משמר השבעה) was an Israeli football club based in Mishmar Hashiv'a. The club existed for several years in the 1950s before folding.

== History ==
Moshav Mishmar HaShiv'a was established shortly after the end of the 1948 Arab–Israeli War, in 1949. A year later, the football club was established, and started – as football league was suspended, due to disagreements between the Maccabi and Hapoel factions in the IFA – playing friendlies against neighboring teams. During the 1950–51 season, the club competed in the Hapoel-only competition, the 30 Years to the Histadrut Shield, in the South division of the second tier, and finished 10th.

The following season, the club was placed in Liga Gimel. The club won its division and was promoted to Liga Bet. However, the club finished bottom and folded after the end of the season.

== Honours ==
=== League ===
Honour	No.	Years
Third tier	1	1951–52
