= 1929–30 in Mandatory Palestine football =

Football in Mandatory Palestine
- Season: 1929–30

The 1929–30 season was the third season of competitive football in the British Mandate for Palestine under the Eretz Israel Football Association.

== IFA Competitions ==
=== 1930 Palestine Cup ===
The Third Palestine Cup was won by the reserve team of Maccabi Tel Aviv (which was in fact Maccabi first team), who had beaten a Northamptonshire Regiment XI 2–1in the final.

3 May 1930

Maccabi Tel Aviv B	2–1	Northamptonshire Regiment
Bachar 20'; Heresh 88'	Do'ar HaYom; Davar	32' Pierce

Old Hapoel Tel Aviv ground
Attendance: 8000
Referee: MacKenzie
