= Ran Itzhak =

Israeli footballer

Ran Itzhak רן יצחק
Personal information
- Full name: Ran Itzhak
- Date of birth: 9 October 1987 (age 39)
- Place of birth: Tel Te'omim, Israel
- Position: Striker

Youth career
- Hapoel Haifa

Senior career*
Years	Team	Apps	(Gls)
2006–2010	Hapoel Haifa	31	(1)
2009	→ Maccabi Ironi Kiryat Ata (loan)	15	(5)
2009–2010	→ Bnei Sakhnin (loan)	12	(2)
2010–2011	Hapoel Rishon LeZion	28	(9)
2011	Ironi Nir Ramat HaSharon	3	(0)
2012	Hapoel Kfar Saba	14	(12)
2012–2013	Ironi Nir Ramat HaSharon	17	(5)
2013	Hapoel Ramat Gan	11	(3)
2013–2014	Hapoel Tel Aviv	6	(1)
2014–2017	Hapoel Kfar Saba	84	(25)
2017–2018	Hapoel Katamon	15	(3)
2018	Hapoel Kfar Saba	12	(0)
- * Club domestic league appearances and goals ‡ National team caps and goals as of 22:25, 10 March 2020 (UTC)

Ran Itzhak (Hebrew: רן יצחק; born 9 October 1987) is an Israeli footballer who plays for Hapoel Kfar Saba as a striker.

== Career ==
=== Early career ===
Itzhak was playing in Hapoel Haifa youth team and first team in his career. He moved to Maccabi Ironi Kiryat Ata in 2009 for a half year loan. The following season he moved to Bnei Sakhnin in the First Division. Itzhak returned to the Second Division to play at Hapoel Rishon LeZion in season 2010/2011, scoring 9 goals in 28 matches, as he was manages to qualify for a first league with Rishon. In 2011, he returned to the first division by 3 games at Ironi Nir Ramat HaSharon. Itzhak returned again to the second division to Hapoel Kfar Saba at 2012. He returned to Ironi Nir Ramat HaSharon the following season and moved in January 2013 Hapoel Ramat Gan, scoring 8 goals in the all season.

=== Hapoel Tel Aviv ===
Itzhak signed at Hapoel Tel Aviv in June 2013, one of the biggest clubs in Israel, for 3 years contract.
