= Hapoel HaNamal Haifa F.C. =

Hapoel Hanamal Haifa
- Full name: Hapoel HaNamal Haifa Football Club הפועל הנמל חיפה
- Founded: 1949
- Dissolved: 1952
- League: Liga Bet
- 1951–52: 6th

Hapoel HaNamal Haifa (Hebrew: הפועל הנמל חיפה), also called Hapoel Namal Haifa, was an Israeli football club based in Haifa.

== History ==
The club was established in 1949 by workers of the Port of Haifa. The club joined Liga Mehuedet, a second-tier league created especially for this season. The club finished as runners-up in the Samaria Division and was placed in Liga Bet, once league activities resumed in fall 1951. During their second season in the league, the club's players rioted during a match with local rivals Hakoah Haifa, and the club was suspended from activities. Following the suspension, the club quit the IFA and folded, its players moving to play for Hapoel Kiryat Haim. A team representing the Haifa harbour operated in later years in the regional Workers Leagues, winning the Prime Minister Cup for workplace clubs in 1963.

In the State Cup, the club enrolled to the 1949 competition, but forfeited their first round tie against Hapoel Tel Aviv without playing a match. The following season, the club defeated Hapoel Jerusalem and Hapoel Zikhron Ya'akov to reach the quarter-finals stage, losing to eventual finalists, Maccabi Tel Aviv 0–2.
