= 1955–56 Liga Gimel =

Israeli football season

The 1955–56 Liga Gimel season saw 72 clubs competing in 10 regional divisions for promotion to Liga Bet. This was the first season of fourth tier football in Israel, following the formation of Liga Leumit as the top division.

Hapoel Saded, Hapoel Kfar Ata, Hapoel Tiberias, Hapoel Zikhron Ya'akov, Hapoel Givat Haim, Hapoel Lod, Hapoel Holon, Hapoel Jaffa, Hapoel Ramla and Hapoel Be'er Sheva won their regional divisions and qualified for the Promotion play-offs.

At the Promotion play-offs, Hapoel Kfar Ata and Hapoel Tiberias were promoted to Liga Bet from the North play-offs, whilst Hapoel Ramla and Hapoel Be'er Sheva were promoted to Liga Bet from the South play-offs.

== Upper Galilee Division ==
Pos	Team	Pld	W	D	L	GF	GA	GD	Pts	Qualification
1	Hapoel Safed	12	–	–	–	–	–	—	21	Promotion play-offs
2	Hapoel Kfar Giladi	12	–	–	–	–	–	—	16	
3	HaChalutz Safed	12	–	–	–	–	–	—	16	
4	Hapoel Ayelet HaShahar	12	–	–	–	–	–	—	9	
5	Hapoel Kiryat Shmona	12	–	–	–	–	–	—	7	
6	Hapoel Lehavot HaBashan	12	–	–	–	–	–	—	2	

Hapoel She'ar Yashuv and Maccabi Safed withdrew from the league during the season.

== Western Galilee Division ==
Pos	Team	Pld	W	D	L	GF	GA	GD	Pts	Qualification
1	Hapoel Kfar Ata	14	–	–	–	–	–	—	25	Promotion play-offs
2	Beitar Acre	14	–	–	–	–	–	—	18	
3	Hapoel Zvi Nahariya	14	–	–	–	–	–	—	18	
4	Hapoel Kfar Hasidim	14	–	–	–	–	–	—	14	
5	Hapoel Yas'ur	14	–	–	–	–	–	—	13	
6	Hapoel Doveh Beit HaEmek	14	–	–	–	–	–	—	4	
7	Hapoel Yehiam Kabri	14	–	–	–	–	–	—	2	
8	Hapoel Matzuva Hanita	14	–	–	–	–	–	—	2	

== Jordan Valley Division ==
Pos	Team	Pld	W	D	L	GF	GA	GD	Pts	Qualification
1	Hapoel Tiberias	10	–	–	–	–	–	—	18	Promotion play-offs
2	Beitar Tiberias	10	–	–	–	–	–	—	16	
3	Hapoel Afikim	10	–	–	–	–	–	—	2	
4	Hapoel Ma'agan	10	–	–	–	–	–	—	2	
5	Hapoel Yavne'el	10	–	–	–	–	–	—	0	
6	Hapoel Kinneret	10	–	–	–	–	–	—	0	

== North Division ==
Pos	Team	Pld	W	D	L	GF	GA	GD	Pts	Qualification
1	Hapoel Zikhron Ya'akov	10	–	–	–	–	–	—	16	Promotion play-offs
2	Beitar Yehuda Haifa	10	–	–	–	–	–	—	15	
3	Atid Haifa	10	–	–	–	–	–	—	10	
4	Beitar Binyamina	10	–	–	–	–	–	—	9	
5	Hapoel Givat Zaid	10	–	–	–	–	–	—	6	
6	Beitar Pardes Hanna	10	–	–	–	–	–	—	0	

- Maccabi Afula withdrew from the league during the season.

== Samaria Division ==
Pos	Team	Pld	W	D	L	GF	GA	GD	Pts	Qualification
1	Hapoel Givat Haim	14	–	–	–	–	–	—	26	Promotion play-offs
2	Beitar Netanya	14	–	–	–	–	–	—	20	
3	Hapoel Nahliel	14	–	–	–	–	–	—	18	
4	Hapoel Givat Olga	14	–	–	–	–	–	—	11	
5	Hapoel Yanuv	14	–	–	–	–	–	—	10	
6	Hapoel Kfar Yona	14	–	–	–	–	–	—	6	
7	Maccabi Meyasdim Hadera	14	–	–	–	–	–	—	5	
8	Hapoel Burgata	14	–	–	–	–	–	—	2	

== Sharon Division ==
Pos	Team	Pld	W	D	L	GF	GA	GD	Pts	Qualification
1	Hapoel Lod	8	–	–	–	–	–	—	16	Promotion play-offs
2	Hapoel Herzliya	8	–	–	–	–	–	—	12	
3	Hapoel Neve Yamin	8	–	–	–	–	–	—	4	
4	Hapoel Elishama	8	–	–	–	–	–	—	0	
5	Hapoel Jaljulia	8	–	–	–	–	–	—	0	

== Dan Division ==
Pos	Team	Pld	W	D	L	GF	GA	GD	Pts	Qualification
1	Hapoel Jaffa	14	–	–	–	–	–	—	21	Promotion play-offs
2	Maccabi Bat Yam	14	–	–	–	–	–	—	21	
3	Hapoel Ever HaYarkon	14	–	–	–	–	–	—	20	
4	Kadima Jaffa	14	–	–	–	–	–	—	17	
5	Beitar Saqiya	14	–	–	–	–	–	—	12	
6	Bar Kochva Tel Aviv	14	–	–	–	–	–	—	9	
7	Hapoel Bat Yam	14	–	–	–	–	–	—	6	
8	Beitar Bat Yam	14	–	–	–	–	–	—	4	

- Beitar Ramat Israel withdrew from the league during the season.
- Hapoel Jaffa defeated Maccabi Bat Yam in a deciding match to qualify to the promotion play-offs.

== Middle Division ==
Pos	Team	Pld	W	D	L	GF	GA	GD	Pts	Qualification
1	Hapoel Holon	18	–	–	–	–	–	—	33	Promotion play-offs
2	Maccabi Holon	18	–	–	–	–	–	—	29	
3	Hapoel Ganei Tikva	18	–	–	–	–	–	—	28	
4	Terra Santa Jaffa	18	–	–	–	–	–	—	22	
5	Hapoel Beit Dagon	18	–	–	–	–	–	—	17	
6	Beitar Yehuda Jerusalem	18	–	–	–	–	–	—	14	
7	Beitar Holon	18	–	–	–	–	–	—	14	
8	Hapoel Kochav Or Yehuda	18	–	–	–	–	–	—	8	
9	Hapoel Azor	18	–	–	–	–	–	—	6	
10	Beitar Beit Dagon	18	–	–	–	–	–	—	4	

== Central Division ==
Pos	Team	Pld	W	D	L	GF	GA	GD	Pts	Qualification
1	Hapoel Ramla	14	–	–	–	–	–	—	23	Promotion play-offs
2	Beitar Lod	14	–	–	–	–	–	—	23	
3	Beitar Ramla	14	–	–	–	–	–	—	18	
4	Hapoel Or Yehuda	14	–	–	–	–	–	—	12	
5	Hapoel Yehud	14	–	–	–	–	–	—	10	
6	Hapoel Kochav HaTzafon Jerusalem	14	–	–	–	–	–	—	9	
7	HaKochav Lod	14	–	–	–	–	–	—	9	
8	Hapoel Hadar Ramatayim	14	–	–	–	–	–	—	8	

== South Division ==
Pos	Team	Pld	W	D	L	GF	GA	GD	Pts	Qualification
1	Hapoel Be'er Sheva	12	–	–	–	–	–	—	23	Promotion play-offs
2	SK Nes Tziona	12	–	–	–	–	–	—	16	
3	Hapoel Be'er Ya'akov	12	–	–	–	–	–	—	15	
4	Hapoel Marmorek	12	–	–	–	–	–	—	10	
5	Hapoel Shoval	12	–	–	–	–	–	—	8	
6	Hapoel Sha'arayim	12	–	–	–	–	–	—	7	
7	Kochav Nes Tziona	12	–	–	–	–	–	—	3	

== See also ==
- 1955–56 Liga Leumit
- 1955–56 Liga Alef
- 1955–56 Liga Bet
