= 1946–47 Palestine League =

Palestine League
- Season: 1946–47
- Champions: Maccabi Tel Aviv; 4th title

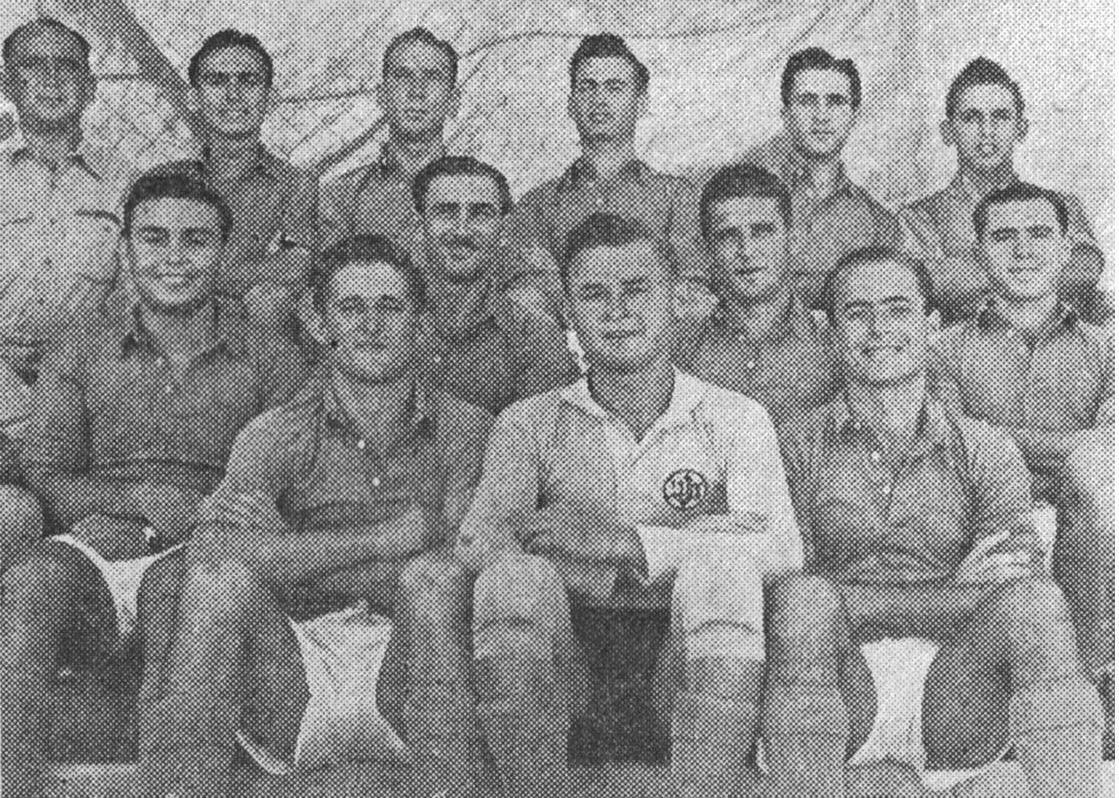
Maccabi Tel Aviv team in 1946

The 1946-47 Palestine League was the eleventh season of league football in Mandatory Palestine. The defending champions were Hapoel Tel Aviv and the championship was won by Maccabi Tel Aviv.

Hapoel Rehovot and Hapoel Herzliya were both relegated, whilst Hakoah Tel Aviv withdrew from league, and in the following month, merged with Hakoah 09 Tel Aviv, which have played in the second tier.

== League table ==
Pos	Team	Pld	W	D	L	GF	GA	GD	Pts	Qualification or relegation
1	Maccabi Tel Aviv	26	22	2	2	116	30	+86	46	Champions
2	Beitar Tel Aviv	26	20	3	3	90	32	+58	43	
3	Maccabi Petah Tikva	26	17	3	6	84	45	+39	37	
4	Hapoel Tel Aviv	26	14	6	6	55	28	+27	34	
5	Hapoel Petah Tikva	26	13	4	9	55	30	+25	30	
6	Hapoel Ramat Gan	26	12	6	8	62	56	+6	30	
7	Maccabi Rehovot	26	10	7	9	55	58	−3	27	
8	Hapoel Haifa	26	9	7	10	57	44	+13	25	
9	Maccabi Netanya	26	9	6	11	47	62	−15	24	
10	Maccabi Rishon LeZion	26	6	7	13	39	67	−28	19	
11	Maccabi Nes Tziona	26	7	4	15	52	68	−16	18	
12	Hapoel Rishon LeZion	26	5	6	15	27	67	−40	16	
13	Hapoel Rehovot	26	4	4	18	23	67	−44	12	Relegated
14	Hapoel Herzliya	26	0	1	25	12	100	−88	1	Relegated

Source: rsssf.com
