= Giv'at Aliyah =

Residential neighborhood of Tel Aviv, Israel

Coordinates: 32°2′11.18″N 34°44′49.85″E

Givat Aliyah גבעת עלייה
- Neighborhood of Tel Aviv
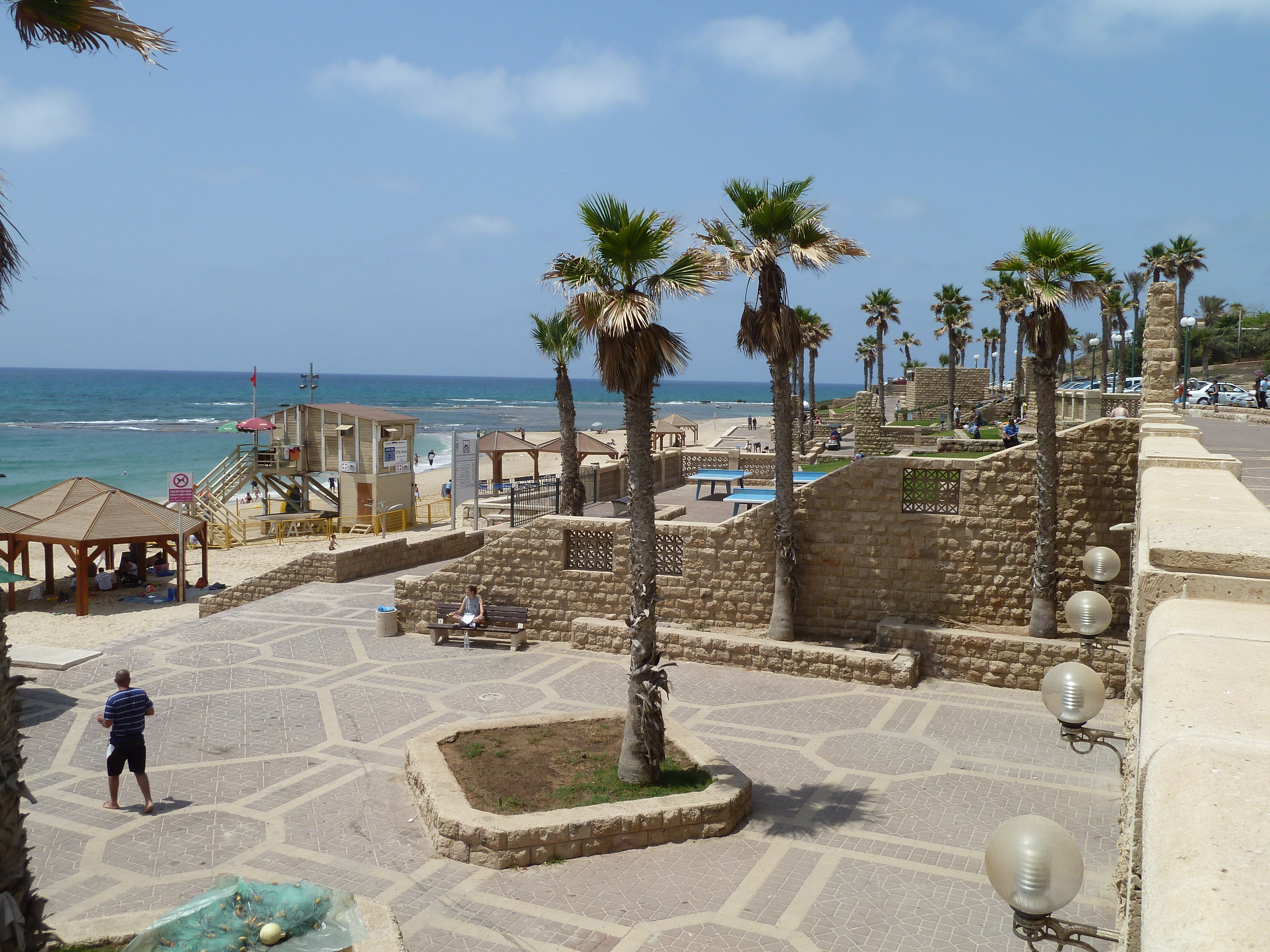
- Aliyah beach
- Interactive map of Givat Aliyah
- Country: Israel
- City: Tel Aviv
- Established: 19th century

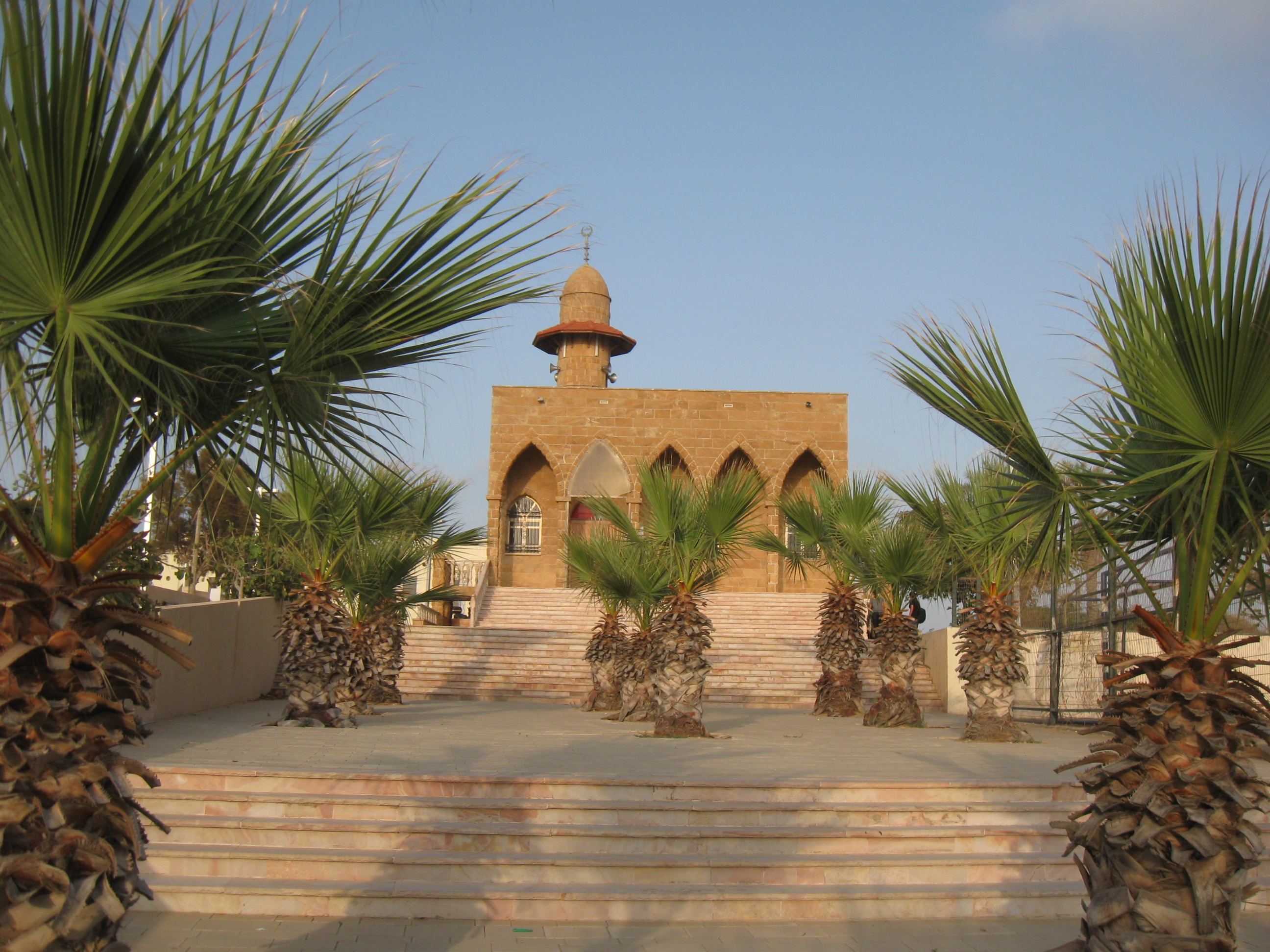
Jabaliya mosque

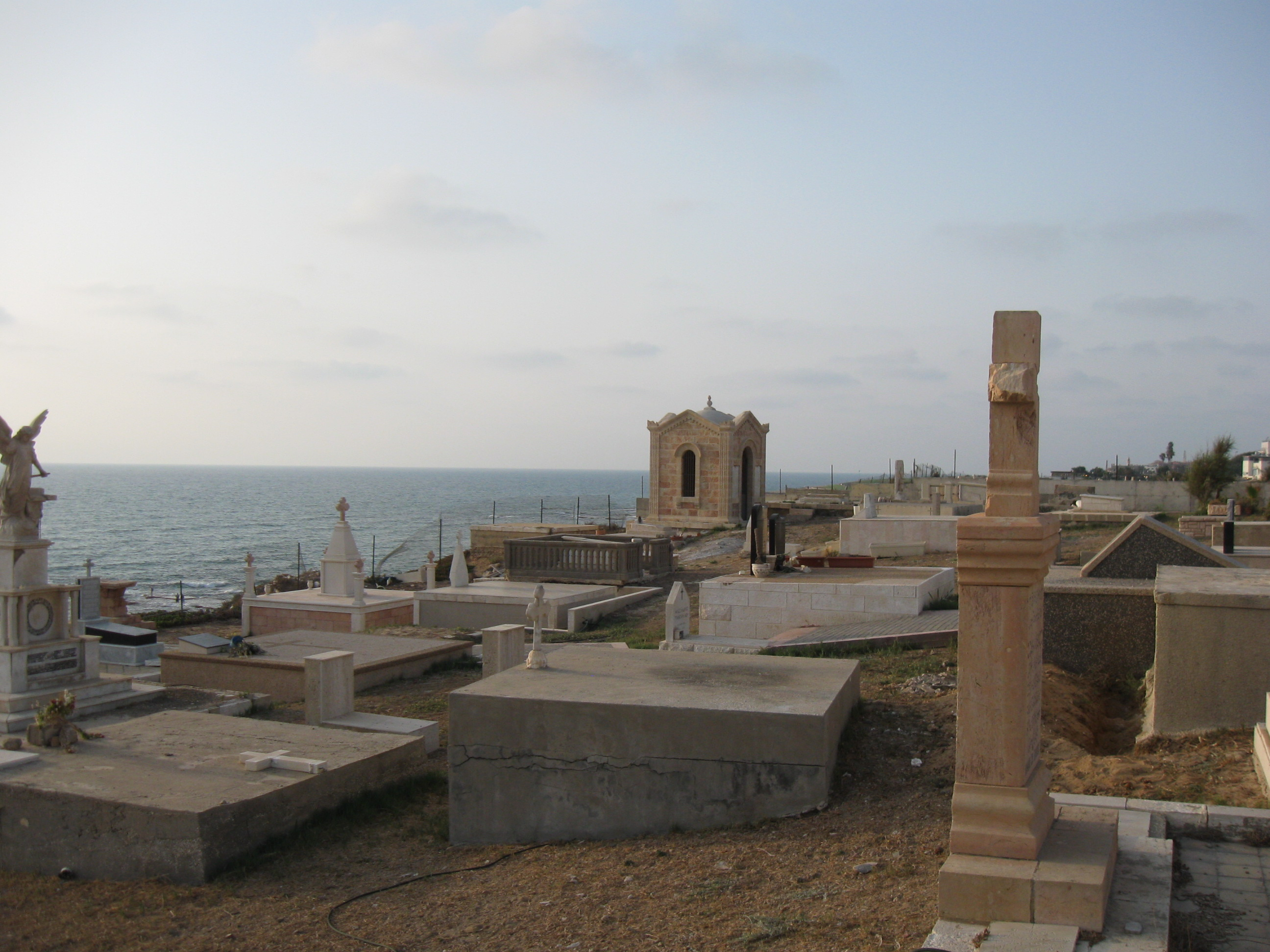
Giv'at Aliya Greek Orthodox cemetery

Giv'at Aliyah (Hebrew: גבעת עלייה) is a residential neighborhood of Tel Aviv, Israel. It is located in the southern part of Jaffa.

== History ==
The first settlers in the area on which the neighborhood is located today were fishermen from the village of Jabalia, north of Gaza, in the 19th century. As the population of Jaffa swelled considerably in the late 19th century, the area attracted rich Arab families from Jaffa, as well as rich residents of other Arab towns, such as Jericho, Nablus and Jerusalem, who built their houses there, and the area became a suburb for the old city. During the British mandate, the area attracted British officers.

During the 1948 Arab-Israeli War, the Arab residents of the area fled and the neighborhood remained mostly empty until it was settled by immigrants arriving from Europe. In the following years, the stronger population moved out of the neighborhood, leaving the weakened population in the neighborhood.

== Landmarks ==
- Peres Peace House – Located in 132 Kedem St., the headquarters of Peres Center for Peace were opened in 2009.
- Beach and nature reserve – The southernmost beach of Tel Aviv-Jaffa. The beach is located within the Giv'at Aliya nature reserve, protecting the natural reefs.

== Sports ==
In the early 1950s a local sport club, Hapoel Giv'at Aliyah, operated in the neighborhood, with a senior team playing in Liga Gimel and a youth team playing in the Tel Aviv division of the youth league. The club was closed in 1952.

Until 2002 Hapoel Tel Aviv had a training facility in the neighborhood for youth development, which was closed when the club moved all its training facilities to a new training facility near the Wolfson Medical Center.
