= Hapoel Jaffa F.C. =

Hapoel Jaffa
- Full name: Hapoel Jaffa Football Club הפועל יפו
- Founded: 1949
- Dissolved: 1962

Hapoel Jaffa (Hebrew: הפועל יפו) was an Israeli football club based in Jaffa, Tel Aviv.

== History ==
The club was founded in 1949 and consisted of players who were new immigrants to Israel. Hapoel Jaffa played their first match at 26 March 1949, in a friendly match against Hapoel HaNamal Haifa, which they won 5–1.

Hapoel played their first football season in Liga Meuhedet, the temporary second tier in the 1949–50 season, where they finished runners-up in the Tel Aviv division, and were placed in Liga Bet, the second tier of Israeli football at the time. In the following season, the club finished bottom of Liga Bet South division, with only nine points, and relegated to Liga Gimel. In the 1954–55 season, the club finished third in the Middle division, one place short from promotion, and remained in Liga Gimel, which became the fourth tier, following restructuring of the Israeli football league system. At the same season, the club had a good run in the Israel State Cup, when they beat Shimshon Tel Aviv, Hapoel Netanya and Hapoel Be'er Ya'akov, before falling down to Beitar Tel Aviv at the fourth round.

In the 1955–56 season, the club won Dan division and qualified for the promotion play-offs against Hapoel clubs from Lod, Holon, Ramla and Be'er Sheva. However, the club failed to achieve promotion and remained in Liga Gimel.

In 1962, Hapoel failed to show up for fixtures, and as a result, punished with suspension of activity by the Israel Football Association and eventually folded.

== Honours ==
=== League ===
| Honour | No. | Years |
|---|---|---|
| Fourth tier | 1 | 1955–56 |
