= Hapoel Rehovot F.C. =

Hapoel Rehovot
- Full name: Hapoel Rehovot Football Club הפועל רחובות
- Founded: 1933
- Dissolved: 1968
- Ground: Hapoel Rehovot Ground, Rehovot
- 1966–68: Liga Bet South B, 14th
Home colours	Away colours

Hapoel Rehovot (Hebrew: הפועל רחובות) was an Israeli football club based in Rehovot. The club spent three seasons in the top division prior to the Israeli Declaration of Independence. In 1968, the club merged with Hapoel Marmorek.

== History ==
The Hapoel sport club in Rehovot was in existence in 1926, and the football section was opened 1933, as Hapoel Rehovot played their first match as a new team against Hapoel Jerusalem. Prior to the Israeli Declaration of Independence, the club played two seasons at the top flight, where they reached the tenth place at the 1943–44 Palestine League season and relegated at the end of the 1946–47 Palestine League season, after second bottom finish.

Following the establishment of the state of Israel, the club competed in Liga Meuhedet, the temporary second tier in the 1949–50 season, where they finished runners-up in the Jerusalem and South division, and were placed in Liga Bet, then the second tier, in the following season. The final match of the 1953–54 season saw the club have a chance to return to the top flight, as they needed only a draw. However, they lost 1–2 to Beitar Jerusalem, which were promoted instead.

In the 1961–62 season, the club finished bottom in Liga Alef South division and relegated to Liga Bet, then the third tier. In the following season, whilst Hapoel Rehovot was placed in Liga Bet South A division, another Hapoel club from Rehovot, Hapoel Marmorek, achieved promotion to Liga Alef from Liga Bet South B division. In the summer of 1968, the two clubs merged, with the merged club which went to compete in Liga Alef, became officially known as Hapoel Marmorek-Rehovot. As a result, the club rights were transferred to Hapoel Kiryat Gat (which took Hapoel Rehovot's spot in Liga Bet) and Hapoel Rehovot disappeared from football, although, in the following season, Hapoel Kiryat Gat played under the name of Hapoel Kiryat Gat Rehovot.

Two of the club players, Avraham Ginzburg (in 1953, 1954) and Meir Tobias (in 1953), went on to play for the Israel national football team.

== Honours ==
=== League ===
Honour	No.	Years
Second tier	1	1941–42

=== Other ===
Honour	No.	Years
30th anniversary of the Histadrut cup (second tier)	1	1950–51
