= 1949–50 Liga Meuhedet =

Liga Meuhedet (Hebrew: ליגה מיוחדת, lit. 'Special League') was a temporary second division of Israeli football in the 1949–50 season, the first after Israeli independence. It consisted of five regional division; North, Samaria, Sharon, Tel Aviv, Jerusalem and South. There was no promotion or relegation.

There was no league football during the 1950–51 season, and when it resumed in 1951–52, Liga Bet returned as the second tier with the same composition as the aborted 1947–48 Liga Bet, with the top teams from Samaria, Tel Aviv and Jerusalem-South divisions replacing inactive teams.

== North Division ==
Pos	Team	Pld	W	D	L	GF	GA	GR	Pts
1	Hapoel Kiryat Haim	16	14	0	2	56	11	5.091	28
2	Hakoah Haifa	16	10	3	3	38	16	2.375	23
3	Hapoel Kfar Ata	16	10	2	4	35	18	1.944	22
4	Hapoel Dror Haifa	16	10	1	5	32	19	1.684	21
5	Hapoel Acre	16	8	1	7	31	33	0.939	17
6	Brit Poalei Eretz Yisrael Nazareth	16	7	3	6	32	25	1.280	16 (Note: Matches between Brit Po'alei Nazareth (1 match), Hapoel Kfar HaHoresh (3 matches), Hapoel Balfouria and Brit Po'alei Haifa (4 matches each) were given as 0–0 with no points awarded.)
7	Hapoel Balfouria	16	1	5	10	5	32	0.156	3
8	Hapoel Kfar HaHoresh	16	1	3	12	4	43	0.093	2
9	Brit Poalei Eretz Yisrael Haifa	16	0	4	12	1	37	0.027	0

Updated to match(es) played on 31 May 1950. Source: Israel FA

== Samaria Division ==
Pos	Team	Pld	W	D	L	GF	GA	GR	Pts
1	Hapoel Hadera	16	13	2	1	46	9	5.111	28
2	Hapoel HaNamal Haifa	16	12	1	3	55	16	3.438	25
3	Maccabi Zikhron Ya'akov	16	8	3	5	45	35	1.286	19
4	Hapoel Givat Haim	16	8	4	4	36	31	1.161	19 (Note: A match between Hapoel Givat Haim and S.C. Atlit was given as 0–0 with no points awarded.)
5	S.C. Atlit	16	6	3	7	22	30	0.733	14
6	Hapoel Zikhron Ya'akov	16	4	4	8	27	30	0.900	12
7	Ahva Notzrit Haifa	16	5	2	9	31	57	0.544	12
8	Degel Yehuda Haifa	16	5	1	10	26	39	0.667	11
9	Hapoel Netanya	16	1	0	15	12	53	0.226	2

Updated to match(es) played on 4 July 1950. Source: Memo No. 31/50, p. 3, IFA

== Sharon Division ==
Pos	Team	Pld	W	D	L	GF	GA	GR	Pts
1	Maccabi Ramat Gan	16	11	5	0	60	12	5.000	27
2	Hapoel Herzliya	16	12	3	1	50	12	4.167	27
3	Hapoel Ra'anana	16	12	3	1	59	16	3.688	27
4	Hapoel Kfar Saba	16	10	0	6	41	24	1.708	20
5	Maccabi Giv'atayim	16	6	0	10	28	42	0.667	12
6	Beitar Ramat Gam	16	5	1	10	24	37	0.649	11
7	Hapoel Even Yehuda	16	5	0	11	22	45	0.489	10
8	Beitar Tel Yehuda	16	3	0	13	15	70	0.214	6
9	Hapoel Yehudia	16	2	0	14	9	50	0.180	4

Updated to match(es) played on 21 June 1950. Source: Memo No. 28, p. 2, IFA

== Tel Aviv Division ==
Pos	Team	Pld	W	D	L	GF	GA	GR	Pts
1	Bnei Yehuda	16	14	0	2	48	6	8.000	28
2	Hapoel Jaffa	16	13	1	2	41	11	3.727	27
3	Maccabi Jaffa	16	11	0	5	40	23	1.739	22
4	Shimshon Tel Aviv	16	9	1	6	34	26	1.308	19
5	Hapoel Holon	16	7	1	8	27	27	1.000	14 (Note: Three matches of Maccabi HaTzafon, against Hapoel Holon, Degel Zion and Beitar Jaffa, were given as 0–0 with no points awarded.)
6	Hakoah Tel Aviv	16	6	1	9	26	42	0.619	13
7	Degel Zion	16	3	3	10	18	34	0.529	8
8	Beitar Jaffa	16	2	1	13	9	45	0.200	4
9	Maccabi HaTzafon	16	1	4	11	9	38	0.237	3

Updated to match(es) played on 4 July 1950. Source: Memo No. 31/50, p. 3, IFA

== Jerusalem and South Division ==
Pos	Team	Pld	W	D	L	GF	GA	GR	Pts
1	Hapoel Jerusalem	16	13	1	2	48	13	3.692	27
2	Hapoel Rehovot	16	11	3	2	48	14	3.429	25
3	Maccabi Sha'arayim	16	11	2	3	30	7	4.286	24
4	Maccabi Jerusalem	16	9	1	6	30	15	2.000	19
5	Beitar Jerusalem	16	9	1	6	37	21	1.762	19
6	Hapoel Lod	16	8	1	7	29	26	1.115	17
7	Hapoel Ramla	16	3	1	12	12	47	0.255	7
8	Hapoel Aqir	16	2	2	12	7	52	0.135	6
9	Hapoel Beit Dagon	16	0	0	16	0	46	0.000	0

Updated to match(es) played on 4 July 1950. Source: Memo No. 31/50, p. 3, IFA

== See also ==
- 1949–50 Israeli League
