= Israeli football league system =

Series of interconnected leagues for club football in Israel

The Israeli football league system is a series of interconnected leagues for club football in Israel. The system has a hierarchical format with promotion and relegation between leagues at different levels, and allows even the smallest club to dream of rising to the very top of the system. There are five levels, containing a total of 16 divisions. It is run by the Israel Football Association (IFA).

== Structure ==
The top division of Israeli football is the Premier League, while Liga Leumit is the second tier; these two divisions all operate at the national level.

Below Liga Leumit the divisions are split into regionalised leagues. Liga Alef is the third tier, and is split into north and south divisions. Liga Bet, the fourth tier, is divided into four regionalised leagues. Liga Gimel, the bottom division of Israeli football, is split into eight regionalised leagues.

Level	Total clubs	League/division(s)							
1	14	Israeli Premier League; 14 clubs							
2	16	Liga Leumit; 16 clubs							
3	36	Liga Alef North; 17 clubs				Liga Alef South; 18 clubs			
4	64	Liga Bet North A 16 clubs		Liga Bet North B 16 clubs		Liga Bet South A 16 clubs		Liga Bet South B 16 clubs	
5	87	Liga Gimel North; Upper Galilee; 9 clubs	Liga Gimel North; Bay Aera; 11 clubs	Liga Gimel North; Jezreel; 11 clubs	Liga Gimel North; Samaria; 10 clubs	Liga Gimel South; Dan; 14 clubs	Liga Gimel South; Tel Aviv; 14 clubs	Liga Gimel South; Central; 9 clubs	Liga Gimel South; South; 9 clubs

=== League structure history ===
League football in Mandatory Palestine began in 1931, and second and third tiers were added to the league as early as 1937. However, football was then disrupted by the Arab revolt and then World War II. In 1947, league football resumed with two tiers, the top Palestine League and the second tier Liga Bet.

Following the Israeli Declaration of Independence and War of Independence, football league action resumed in 1949, with a two-tier league, the second served as a temporary second division, titled Liga Meuhedet (lit. 'Special League'). The following season, league football was cancelled due to disagreements between the Maccabi and Hapoel factions in the IFA. With the return of league football the following season, a third tier was added, and the leagues were assigned as Liga Alef (lit. 'League A'), Liga Bet ('League B') and Liga Gimel ('League C').

In 1955–56, Liga Leumit (lit. 'National League') was created as the new top division, demoting the Alef, Bet and Gimel leagues to the second, third and fourth tiers respectively, with a fifth tier, Liga Dalet (lit. 'Liga D') added for one season in 1958–59, before returning in 1969–70.

In 1976–77, Liga Artzit (lit. 'State League') was created as the new second tier, demoting the Alef, Bet, Gimel and Dalet leagues to the third, fourth, fifth and sixth tiers. Liga Dalet was scrapped at the end of the 1984–85 season, bringing back the league system to five tiers.

In 1999–2000 the Israeli Premier League was added at the top of the league system, demoting the other leagues to second to sixth tiers. At the end of the 2008–09 season, Liga Artzit was scrapped, bringing the league system back to five tiers, and its current structure

==== League system changes ====
Years	1st tier	2nd tier	3rd tier	4th tier	5th tier	6th tier
1946–1948	Palestine League	Liga Bet	—	—	—	—
1949–1950	Israeli League	Liga Meuhedet	—	—	—	—
1951–1955	Liga Alef	Liga Bet	Liga Gimel	—	—	—
1955–1958	Liga Leumit	Liga Alef	Liga Bet	Liga Gimel	—	—
1958–1959	Liga Leumit	Liga Alef	Liga Bet	Liga Gimel	Liga Dalet	—
1959–1969	Liga Leumit	Liga Alef	Liga Bet	Liga Gimel	—	—
1969–1976	Liga Leumit	Liga Alef	Liga Bet	Liga Gimel	Liga Dalet	—
1976–1985	Liga Leumit	Liga Artzit	Liga Alef	Liga Bet	Liga Gimel	Liga Dalet
1985–1999	Liga Leumit	Liga Artzit	Liga Alef	Liga Bet	Liga Gimel	—
1999–2009	Premier League	Liga Leumit	Liga Artzit	Liga Alef	Liga Bet	Liga Gimel
2009–present	Premier League	Liga Leumit	Liga Alef	Liga Bet	Liga Gimel	—

== Leagues ==
=== Premier League ===
The Israeli Premier League (Hebrew: ליגת העל, Ligat HaAl, lit. Super League) is the highest league in Israeli football and has 14 member clubs. Winning the Premier League is the top prize in Israeli football and guarantees a berth in the UEFA Europa League.

The league was created in 1999 as the IFA aimed to realign the leagues to improve competition. Two teams are relegated to Liga Leumit at the end of each season, with two clubs promoted in return.

==== Current Premier League clubs (2025–26) ====
- Beitar Jerusalem
- Bnei Sakhnin
- F.C. Ashdod
- Hapoel Be'er Sheva
- Hapoel Haifa
- Hapoel Jerusalem
- Hapoel Petah Tikva
- Hapoel Tel Aviv
- Ironi Kiryat Shmona
- Ironi Tiberias
- Maccabi Bnei Reineh
- Maccabi Haifa
- Maccabi Netanya
- Maccabi Tel Aviv

=== Liga Leumit ===
Liga Leumit (Hebrew: ליגה לאומית, lit. National League) is the second tier of Israeli football, a position it has held since 1999, having originally been the top division prior to the Premier League's creation. It has 16 member clubs, the team finished first are promoted to the Premier League, The bottom two or three teams are relegated to Liga Alef at the end of each season.

=== Current Liga Leumit clubs (2025–26) ===
- Bnei Yehuda Tel Aviv
- F.C. Kafr Qasim
- F.C. Kiryat Yam
- Hapoel Acre
- Hapoel Afula
- Hapoel Hadera
- Hapoel Kfar Saba
- Hapoel Kfar Shalem
- Hapoel Nof HaGalil
- Hapoel Ra'anana
- Hapoel Ramat Gan
- Hapoel Rishon LeZion
- Ironi Modi'in
- Maccabi Herzliya
- Maccabi Jaffa
- Maccabi Petah Tikva

=== Liga Alef ===
Liga Alef (Hebrew: ליגה א', lit. A League) is the third tier of Israeli football, a position it has held since 2009. Between 1999 and 2009 it was the fourth tier after Liga Artzit, between 1976 and 1999 it was the third tier after Liga Artzit, between 1955 and 1976 it was the second division, and between 1951 and 1955 it was the first division. Liga Alef consists of two divisions and has 32 member clubs. The divisions are based on the clubs' geographical position in the country and are split into a north and south category. The top club from each division is promoted at the end of the season to Liga Leumit, the bottom two clubs (from each division) are relegated at the end of the season to Liga Bet.

North	South
F.C. Tira	Beitar Yavne
Hapoel Baqa al-Gharbiyye	F.C. Dimona
Hapoel Beit She'an/Mesilot	F.C. Jerusalem
Hapoel Bnei Araba	F.C. Kfar Saba
Hapoel Bnei Musmus	F.C. Nordia Jerusalem
Hapoel Ironi Karmiel	F.C. Tzeirei Tira
Hapoel Migdal HaEmek	Hapoel Azor
Hapoel Tirat HaCarmel	Hapoel Herzliya
Hapoel Umm al-Fahm	Hapoel Marmorek
Ironi Nesher	Hapoel Nir Ramat HaSharon
Maccabi Akhi Nazareth	Holon Yermiyahu F.C.
Maccabi Ata Bialik	Maccabi Ironi Ashdod
Maccabi Neve Sha'anan Eldad	Maccabi Kiryat Gat
Maccabi Nujeidat	Maccabi Kiryat Malakhi
Tzeirei Umm al-Fahm	Maccabi Yavne
Tzeirei Tamra	Shimshon Tel Aviv

=== Liga Bet ===
Liga Bet (Hebrew: ליגה ב', lit. B League) is the fourth tier of Israeli football, a position it has held since 2009. Between 1999 and 2009 it was the fifth tier after Liga Alef, Between 1976 and 1999 it was the fourth tier after the creation of Liga Artzit, between 1955 and 1976 it was the third division, and between 1951 and 1955 it was the second division. Liga Bet consists of four divisions and has 64 member clubs. The divisions are based on the clubs' geographical position in the country and are split into two north categories and two south categories. The top club from each division is promoted at the end of the season to the Liga Alef and the bottom two clubs (from each division) are relegated at the end of the season to Liga Gimel.

North A	North B	South A	South B
Ahva Kafr Manda	F.C. Tzeirei Haifa	A.S. Holon Mor	Beitar Kiryat Gat
Beitar Nahariya	Beitar Haifa	Beitar Tel Aviv Holon	Hapoel Ironi Ashkelon
Bnei M.M.B.E.	F.C. Bnei Qalansawe	F.C. Bnei Jaffa Ortodoxim	Bnei Eilat
Bnei Maghar	F.C. Kababir	F.C. Hapoel Lod Beni Regev	F.C. Arad
F.C. Shefa-Amr	F.C. Mashhad	Beitar Kfar Saba	F.C. Hapeol Yeruham
F.C. Tzeirei Kfar Manda	F.C. Or Akiva	Beitar Petah Tikva	F.C. Hapoel Shaqib al-Salam
Hapoel Bnei Bi'ina	F.C. Tirat HaCarmel	Beitar Ramat Gan	F.C. Ramla
Hapoel Bnei Ein Mahil	Tzeirei Kafr Kanna	Bnei Jaljulia	F.C. Shikun HaMizrah
Hapoel Bnei Jadeidi-Makr	F.C. Tzofi Haifa	Hakoah Amidar Ramat Gan	Hapoel Bnei Ashdod
Hapoel Deir Hanna	Hapeol Yaffa	Hapoel Hod HaSharon	Ihud Tzeiri Abu Ghosh
Hapoel Ihud Bnei Sumei	Hapoel Bnei Ar'ara 'Ara	Hapoel Kafr Qasim Shouaa	Ironi Beit Shemesh
Hapoel Kaukab	Hapoel Daliyat al-Karmel	Hapoel Kiryat Ono	Maccabi Be'er Sheva
Maccabi Abu Snan	Hapoel Ramot Menashe Megiddo	Hapoel Mahane Yehuda	Maccabi Be'er Ya'akov Amit
Maccabi Ahva Sha'ab	Hapoel Ihud Bnei Jatt	Ironi Beit Dagan	Maccabi Ironi Netivot
Maccabi Bnei Jadeidi-Makr	Ihud Bnei Baqa	Maccabi Ironi Amishav Petah Tikva	F.C. Sderot
Maccabi Ihud Bnei Ibtin	Maccabi Ahi Iksal	Maccabi Ironi Kfar Yona	Maccabi Sha'arayim

=== Liga Gimel ===
Liga Gimel (Hebrew: ליגה ג', lit. C League) is the fifth and bottom tier of Israeli football, a position it has held since 2009. Between 1999 and 2009 it was the sixth tier after Liga Bet, Between 1976 and 1999 it was the fifth tier after the creation of Liga Artzit, between 1955 and 1976 it was the fourth division, and between 1951 and 1955 it was the third division. Liga Gimel consists of eight divisions of varying size. At the start of the 2014–15 season there are a total of 111 member clubs. If they meet criteria laid down by the IFA, the top club from each division is promoted at the end of the season to the Liga Bet. As it is the lowest division, no clubs are relegated.

=== Football clubs in Israel ===
For a full list of clubs see List of football clubs in Israel.

== Other football league systems in Israel ==
=== Women's League ===
Ligat Nashim was established in 1999. Until 2010, the league system was played with only the top division (except for 2006–07), sometimes divided regionally. Since 2010, the league has two tiers, both national. Depending on number of registrations, the second division may be divided regionally, but this hadn't happen yet.

At women's youth levels (under 19 and under 17), there is only a top division, divided regionally at both age brackets, with the champion decided using a play-off match.

=== Noar League ===
Since 2011, the league had been organized in four tiers. At the top, a national division called Noar Premier League, two regional divisions at tiers 2 and 3 (Noar Leumit League and Noar Artzit League, respectively) and a changing number of regional divisions at the 4th tier, depending on registrations.
