= Degel Yehuda Haifa F.C. =

Israeli football club

Degel Yehuda Haifa
- Full name: Degel Yehuda Haifa Football Club דגל יהודה חיפה
- Founded: 1944
- Dissolved: 1956
- 1955–56: Liga Gimel, ?

Degel Yehuda Haifa (Hebrew: דגל יהודה חיפה, lit. Judah Flag Haifa), was an Israeli football club based in Haifa.

== History ==
The club was founded in 1944 by Sephardi Jews in Haifa and mostly played friendlies in its first years of existence. In 1946, the club entered Liga Bet, where it finished second-bottom. The club finished second-bottom once again in Liga Meuhedet, but despite this it was placed in Liga Bet. The club achieved its best position, 8th, in 1952, but returned to second-bottom the following season and relegated to Liga Gimel.

In 1956 the club merged with Beitar Haifa to create Beitar Yehuda. However, at the end of the season the merge was cancelled and the club wasn't re-established.
