= Hakoah Haifa F.C. =

Hakoah Haifa
- Full name: Hakoah Haifa Football Club הכח חיפה
- Founded: 1944
- Dissolved: 1956
- League: Liga Bet
- 1955–56: 11th/12th (relegated)

Hakoah Haifa (Hebrew: הכח חיפה or הכוח חיפה), also called Hakoah 09 Haifa, was an Israeli football club based in Haifa.

== History ==
The club was established in 1944 in Haifa, as part of sport association established by Hakoah Vienna veterans, called Hakoah 09 (as Hakoah Vienna was established in 1909, and to differentiate the sport association from Hakoah Tel Aviv, which was established by Hakoah Berlin veterans). As the sport association was renamed "Hakoah", following the merger of Hakoah Tel Aviv and Hakoah 09 Tel Aviv, the club was renamed Hakoah Haifa. The football club was part the Hakoah Haifa Sports Club, which also included boxing, tennis and handball sections.

The club joined the IFA league in 1946 and was placed in Liga Bet, the second tier of the league. After the Israeli Declaration of Independence, the club joined Liga Mehuedet, a second-tier league created especially for this season. The club finished as runners-up in the North Division and was placed in Liga Bet, once league activities resumed in fall 1951. The club stayed in the second tier until the end of the 1954–55 season, when, as the Israeli football league system was restructured to have a single division in the second tier, the club, which finished 6th, dropped to the third tier. The following season, the club relegated to the fourth division and folded.
