= Hapoel Dror Haifa F.C. =

- Full name: Hapoel Dror Haifa Football Club הפועל דרור חיפה
- Founded: 1940
- Dissolved: 1953
- League: Liga Bet
- 1953–54: 11th (North division)

Hapoel Dror Haifa F.C. (Hebrew: הפועל דרור חיפה) was a football club from Haifa, Israel.

== History ==
The club was established in 1940 by Jewish immigrants from Thessaloniki and for the first years played junior football. The club entered the 1946 Palestine Cup, where it lost its two first round matches against Maccabi Petah Tikva. The club entered the second division for the 1947–48 season, which was interrupted and abandoned due to the outbreak of the 1947–48 Civil War in Mandatory Palestine. As league matches resumed, in 1949, the club re-joined the second division, called Liga Meuhedet (lit. Special League), finishing fourth in the North division. The club competed in the second division, which was renamed Liga Bet in 1951, for two additional seasons, folding at the end of the 1953–54 season.
