= Hapoel Atlit F.C. =

Hapoel Atlit
- Full name: Hapoel Atlit Football Club הפועל עתלית
- Founded: 1946; 80 years ago
- Dissolved: 1985; 41 years ago

Hapoel Atlit F.C. (Hebrew: הפועל עתלית), called Sport Club Atlit (Hebrew: מועדון ספורט עתלית) between 1946 and 1956, was a football club from Atlit, Israel. The club joined the second division in 1946–47, and played in this division until the end of 1954–55, when the second division was reorganized from two regional divisions into one national division.

In 1956 the club changed its name to Hapoel Atlit, continuing to play in Liga Bet, which was the third division at the time. The club relegated to Liga Gimel at the end of the 1964–65 season, but bounced back the following season after winning its division and placing third in the play-offs. The club relegated back to Liga Gimel at the end of the 1969–70 season, where it remained until it folded.

== Honours ==
=== League ===
Honour	No.	Years
Fourth tier	1	1965–66
