= Maccabi Zikhron Ya'akov F.C. =

Maccabi Zikhron Ya'akov
- Full name: Maccabi Zikhron Ya'akov Football Club מועדון כדורגל מכבי זכרון יעקב
- Founded: 1912; 113 years ago
- Dissolved: 1995; 30 years ago
- Ground: Maccabi Zikhron Ya'akov Ground, Zikhron Ya'akov

Maccabi Zikhron Ya'akov Football Club (Hebrew: מועדון כדורגל מכבי זכרון יעקב) was an Israeli football club based at Zikhron Ya'akov. The club was founded in 1913, and was one of the first football clubs established in Ottoman Palestine.

== History ==
The club was founded in 1912 and was among the first football clubs to be formed in Palestine. During its early years, the club played matches against nearby clubs, such as Maccabi Hadera, Maccabi Haifa and clubs from nearby settlements, such as Binyamina and Giv'at Ada. The club took part in the 1929 and 1930 editions of the Palestine Cup, reaching the semi-finals in 1929, before falling to Maccabi Tel Aviv.

The club joined the league system after the Israeli Declaration of Independence and took part in the 1949–50 Liga Meuhedet, reaching third place in the Samaria division, and being placed in second tier the following season. The club played in the second tier until the end of 1954–55 season, when a restructuring of the second tier led to the club being relegated to the third tier. Another relegation followed in 1956–57. However, the club made a return to Liga Bet, and promoted further to the second tier at the end of the 1962–63 season. The club stayed in the second tier for two seasons, before being relegated at the end of the 1964–65 season to the third tier, where the club played until the creation of Liga Artzit, which demoted Liga Bet to the fourth tier. The club played in the lower levels until the 1995–96 season, when the club merged with local rivals Hapoel Zikhron Ya'akov to create Ironi Zikhron Ya'akov. The merged club was dissolved at the end of the 1999–2000 season, following relegation from Liga Bet to Liga Gimel.

Although the senior team was disbanded, the club is still operating youth level teams.

The club holds the Israeli record for most goals scored in a cup match, a record obtained on 18 December 1971, when it beat Maccabi Beit She'an 25–2 in the second round of the 1971–72 Israel State Cup, while its forward Elias Elias scored 11 of these goals.

== Honours ==
- Liga Gimel
  - 1958–59 (1)
