= Hapoel Hadera F.C. =

Israeli football club

Hapoel Hadera
- Full name: Hapoel Hadera–Giv'at Olga "Shulem Schwarz" Football Club
- Founded: 1936
- Ground: Netanya Stadium, Netanya
- Capacity: 13,610
- Owner(s): Yakir Schwartz & Yossi Maor
- Manager: Nisso Avitan
- League: Liga Leumit
- 2024–25: Israeli Premier League, 14th of 14 (relegated)
Home colours	Away colours	Third colours

Hapoel Hadera–Giv'at Olga "Shulem Schwarz" F.C. (Hebrew: מועדון כדורגל הפועל חדרה–גבעת אולגה שולם שוורץ) is an Israeli football club from Hadera who currently play in the Liga Leumit, the second tier of Israeli football following relegation from the Israeli Premier League in the 2024–25 season.

== History ==
The club was founded in 1936, although footballing activities in Hapoel branch in Hadera occurred as early as 1928. During the late years of the British Mandate the club entered EIFA cup and league competitions, however, due to the 1947–1949 Palestine war the club was disbanded.

After the Israeli Declaration of Independence the club was reformed and entered the league competitions at the second level. The club was promoted to Liga Alef, then the top division, in 1954. However, they were relegated at the end of their first season in the top tier, after finishing second from bottom. In 1957 they finished high enough in Liga Alef (by then the second tier) to compete in the play-offs for promotion to Liga Leumit, but missed out on goal difference by one goal.

The club had to wait until 1970 for another promotion, when they were promoted as Liga Alef champions. They narrowly avoided relegation in the 1970–71 season, finishing above relegated Maccabi Petah Tikva on goal difference. However, they were relegated the following season after finishing bottom. This time they bounced back immediately as Liga Alef runners-up, and finished 13th in 1973–74, a single point above the relegation zone.

Although 1974–75 saw the club finish in their highest-ever position, 7th, they were relegated the following season. The club made a second immediate return to the top flight as Liga Artzit (the new second division) champions, but were relegated again in 1979, not to return to the top division until 2018.

In 1986 and 1989 the club won the Liga Artzit Toto Cup. In 1994 they were deducted 12 points after being found guilty of match-fixing in a league game against Hakoah Ramat Gan. They were relegated to the third tier in 1997, and following league restructuring in 1999, sank into the fourth division. They were relegated again to Liga Bet in 2003.

In 2006, All the football clubs from Hadera merged into one club called Hapoel Ironi Eran Hadera, and at the end of the 2007–08 season the club won the South A division of Liga Bet and were promoted back to Liga Alef.

In the 2009–10 season, the club battled for promotion to Liga Leumit and was leading 70% of the season at 1st place. However, they did not achieve promotion after finishing 3rd place at Liga Alef South division. in next season of 2010–11 they changed division to the North, and it was a beginning of bad financial problem, and with small budget they needed to build the club from the beginning. At that season, the manager was Ami Elhadad, one of the players who played for the club in the 1970s. at the end of the season they finished in the 8th place.

The 2011–12 season was one of their worst seasons, as they finished in the 14th place and had to play-off against Ihud Bnei Maksur from Liga bet. Hadera won the relegation play-off 2–1 after goals scored by Momo Nistel and Elias Zana. during the season, the club saw changes in the manager position, when Ami Elhadad resigned from the club, and replaced by the youth manager, Yohanan Israelov, who did not finish the season as well, as Itzik Ben Tora managed the club in the last two games. In the 2012–13 season, Eyal Amar, former player for the club, took over the manager position, after three seasons as the manager of local rivals, F.C. Givat Olga. the club started the season well, when it showed good games. However, at the end of the season they finished in 7th place. Manager Eyal Amar left the club and returned to Givat Olga.

In the 2013–14 season, the club was managed by Ahmed Wahab as manager and Yosef Mogiliovsky as assistant manager, and placed 8th after the first round of the league (15 games). After Ahmed Wahab left the club with his son, Barkat, due to financial problems, and Kobi Badash left for Hapoel Migdal HaEmek, Hadera signed new manager, Ron Keler, which trained the youth section of the club, and finished the season in 7th place, 6 points short of the promotion play-offs.

The 2014–15 season started with Gil Fishel as the new manager. But after 10 games, the manager resigned because of financial problems. And after that, Sasha Feldman, who was a player of the club, took care of the coaching team. After 4 games, he left the club, and in the derby with MS Givat Olga, Itsik Ben Tora stood on the line 1 match than, Yohanan Izraelov return to training the team he was coaching for only 5 games and left too. Ron Keller, who trained last season, took care of the club and made a success with the team and reached 9th place at Liga Alef North. and was the first to win derby in the last match 1–0 on Givat Olga.

In season 2015–16 was talking to take new management of the team but the talks didn't bring anything and Yoav Kobi still the owner of the club. The team signed new coach past player Momo Nistel that trained before Beitar Pardes Hana with success.

In season 2016–17 was a big year in the club. The team promoted to Liga Leumit the second tier in Israel. after finishing 1st place in the league. It was the first time after 20 seasons it was the last time to play in second tier.

In season 2017–18, the club was promoted again to the Israeli Premier League for the first time after 40 years from the second place of Liga Leumit.

In the next season, Hapoel Hadera made a big sensation in the Premier League and secured the place in the championship playoff, what brought the club to improve their previous record in the First Division, seventh place, and finish the season in the sixth place. In the following years Hapoel Hadera finished each season at the bottom half of the table, narrowly avoiding relegation until 2025, when it finished last in the league table and was relegated to the second division again.

== Players ==
=== Current squad ===
As of 29 March, 2026.

No.	Pos.	Nation	Player
1	GK	SRB	Nikola Đurković
3	DF	ISR	Ido Krebs
4	DF	ISR	Abdi Farhat
6	MF	ISR	Lior Rokach
7	FW	ISR	Netanel Hagani
8	MF	ISR	Shlomi Azulay
9	MF	CMR	Christian Bella (on loan from Ironi Kiryat Shmona)
11	FW	ISR	Mor Fadida
12	DF	ISR	Ilay Tomer
14	MF	ISR	Haim Mekonen
15	MF	ISR	Menashe Zalka (captain)
16	DF	ISR	Sapir Itah
17	MF	ISR	Sagas Tambi

No.	Pos.	Nation	Player
18	DF	ISR	Roy Hazan
19	MF	ISR	Tom Aida (on loan from Hapoel Ramat Gan)
23	MF	ISR	Sarel Shlomo Cohen (on loan from Maccabi Haifa)
26	DF	ISR	Ofek Geller
28	DF	ISR	Uri Magbo
29	MF	MLI	Ladji Mallé
30	MF	ISR	Yoav Turgeman
32	GK	ISR	Robi Levkovich
33	DF	HAI	Francois Dulysse
44	GK	ISR	Shahar Mark
55	MF	ISR	Yanai Ben Shushan
77	MF	ISR	Itay Shalev

=== Out on loan ===
Note: Flags indicate national team as defined under FIFA eligibility rules; some limited exceptions apply. Players may hold more than one non-FIFA nationality.

No. / Pos. / Nation / Player; — / MF / ISR / Ron Unger (at Ironi Tiberias until 30 June 2026)	No. / Pos. / Nation / Player

=== Foreigners 2025–26 ===
Only up six non-Israeli nationals can be in an Israeli club squad (only five can play at the same time). Those with Jewish ancestry, married to an Israeli or have played in Israel for an extended period of time, can claim a passport or permanent residency, which would allow them to play with Israeli status.

- (Panama) Ansony Frías
- (Senegal) Ladji Mallé
- (Haiti) Francois Dulysse

== Honours ==
=== League ===
Honour	No.	Years
Second tier	6	1940, 1949–50, 1953–54, 1969–70, 1972–73, 1976–77
Third tier	3	1961–62, 1981–82, 2016–17
Fifth tier	1	2007–08

=== Cup competitions ===
Honour	No.	Years
Liga Leumit League Cup (first Tier)	1	1975–76
Toto Cup (second tier)	2	1985–86, 1988–89

== Notable managers ==
- Eli Cohen (born 1951)
