= 1955–56 Maccabi Haifa F.C. season =

Maccabi Haifa
1955–56 season
- Manager: Ya'akov Stern
- Stadium: Kiryat Haim Stadium; Kiryat Eliezer Stadium
- Liga Alef (1955) Liga Leumit (1956): 6th 5th
- State Cup: Semi-finals
- Top goalscorer: League: Jonny Hardy (15); All: Jonny Hardy (16)

The 1955–56 Maccabi Haifa season was the club's 43rd season since its establishment in 1913, and 8th since the establishment of the State of Israel.

At the start of the season, the league which started during the previous season was completed, with the club finishing 6th. The new league season, with the top division being renamed Liga Leumit, began on 3 December 1955 and was completed on 3 June 1956, with the club finishing 5th.

During the season, the club also competed in the State Cup, which was also carried over the summer break. The club eliminated city rivals Hapoel Haifa in the quarter-finals, winning 4–0, but was defeated by Maccabi Tel Aviv 0–5 in the semi-finals.

On 15 September 1955 a new stadium, Kiryat Eliezer Stadium, officially called Haifa Municipal Stadium or Luigi Antonini Stadium, was opened with a match between a Haifa XI and a Tel Aviv XI. Maccabi Haifa started playing home matches in the stadium on 24 September 1955, starting with a match against Hapoel Haifa.

== Match Results ==
=== Legend ===
Win Draw Loss

=== International friendly matches ===
During the season Maccabi Haifa played three international friendly matches, losing all of them.

16 February 1956	Maccabi Haifa	2–3	Kapfenberger SV	Haifa
	Ben-Tzvi 8'; Litvak 72'	Davar (in Hebrew)	60' Wirboda; 65' Hauberger; 87' Gollnhuber	Stadium: Kiryat Eliezer Stadium; Attendance: 6,500; Referee: Klein

5 May 1956	Maccabi Haifa	3–4	Sunderland	Haifa
	Held 23', 58'; Almani 41'		16' Elliott; 76' Fleming; 81' Morrison 87' Shackleton	Stadium: Kiryat Eliezer Stadium; Attendance: 10,000; Referee: Sher

30 June 1956	Maccabi Haifa	1–4	First Vienna	Tel Aviv
	Almani 71'		51', 73', 47' Buzek; 67' Manasse	Stadium: Basa Stadium; Attendance: 6,000; Referee: Palman

=== 1954–55 Liga Alef ===
The league began on 6 February 1955, and by the time the previous season ended, only 20 rounds of matches were completed, with the final 6 rounds being played during September and October 1955.

==== Final table ====
Pos	Team	Pld	W	D	L	GF	GA	GR	Pts
4	Maccabi Netanya	26	13	7	6	54	43	1.256	33
5	Beitar Tel Aviv	26	12	5	9	64	47	1.362	29
6	Maccabi Haifa	26	11	6	9	54	41	1.317	28
7	Maccabi Petah Tikva	26	10	7	9	37	41	0.902	27
8	Maccabi Rehovot	26	11	4	11	49	48	1.021	26

Source: 100 Years of Football 1906-2006, Elisha Shohat (Israel), 2006

==== Matches ====
3 September 1955 21	Maccabi Haifa	3–2	Hapoel Hadera	Haifa
	Tenenbaum 18', 76'; Georgiou 46'	Report (p. 8)	30' Rubin; 41' (o.g.) T. Cohen	Stadium: Kiryat Haim Stadium; Attendance: 2,000; Referee: Rosenbaum

10 September 1955 22	Hapoel Balfouria	0–6	Maccabi Haifa	Afula
		Report (p. 8)	7' Hardy; 19', 82' Fuchs; 31' (pen.) Ben-Tzvi; 73', 88' Held	Stadium: Hapoel Ground; Attendance: 500; Referee: Markovich

24 September 1955 23	Maccabi Haifa	4–1	Hapoel Haifa	Haifa
	Hardy 41'; Fuchs 65'; Held 75'; Tenenbaum 87'	Report (p. 8)	24' Kremer	Stadium: Kiryat Eliezer Stadium; Attendance: 6,000; Referee: Fritzner

1 October 1955 24	Maccabi Rehovot	3–2	Maccabi Haifa	Rehovot
	Shrager 13', 32'; Litvak 75'	Report (p. 8)	39' Hardy; 78' Fuchs	Stadium: Maccabi Ground; Attendance: 2,200; Referee: Werner

8 October 1955 25	Maccabi Haifa	0–3	Hapoel Tel Aviv	Haifa
		Report (p. 8)	43', 61' Yehudayoff; 81' Michaelov	Stadium: Kiryat Eliezer Stadium; Attendance: 5,000; Referee: Rosenbaum

15 October 1955 26	Maccabi Petah Tikva	3–3	Maccabi Haifa	Petah Tikva
	Spiegel 31'; Itzhaki 36'; Leba 89' (pen.)	Report (p. 8)	47' Held; 73', 81' Hardy	Stadium: Maccabi Ground; Attendance: 1,000; Referee: Fried

==== Results by match ====
Round	1	2	3	4	5	6	7	8	9	10	11	12	13	14	15	16	17	18	19	20	21	22	23	24	25	26
Result	L	L	D	L	W	L	L	W	D	L	W	D	L	W	W	W	W	D	W	D	W	W	W	L	L	D
Position	12	12	12	12	12	12	13	13	12	13	9	11	11	10	8	6	7	6	6	6	6	5	4	5	5	6

Updated to match(es) played on 15 October 1955. Source: 2 Dear Points
W = Win; D = Draw; L = Loss

=== 1955–56 Liga Leumit ===
==== Final table ====
Pos	Team	Pld	W	D	L	GF	GA	GR	Pts
3	Hapoel Tel Aviv	22	12	5	5	49	29	1.690	29
4	Maccabi Petah Tikva	22	10	7	5	43	34	1.265	27
5	Maccabi Haifa	22	11	3	8	53	27	1.963	25
6	Hapoel Haifa	22	9	4	9	32	39	0.821	22
7	Beitar Tel Aviv	22	10	0	12	41	48	0.854	20

Source: Davar (in Hebrew)
Rules for classification: 1) points; 2) goal ratio 3) goals scored.

==== Matches ====
3 December 1955 1	Maccabi Haifa	1–2	Hapoel Petah Tikva	Haifa
	Almani 80'		24' (pen.) Kofman; 76' Chirik	Stadium: Kiryat Eliezer Stadium; Attendance: 4,000; Referee: Ben-Rubi

10 December 1955 2	Hapoel Kfar Saba	1–4	Maccabi Haifa	Kfar Saba
	Bulman 60'		6', 62' Menchel; 25', 84' S. Levi	Stadium: Hapoel Ground; Attendance: 1,400; Referee: Moshe Cohen

17 December 1955 3	Maccabi Haifa	1–3	Maccabi Tel Aviv	Haifa
	Ben-Tzvi 53' (pen.)		7' Merimovich; 55' Israeli; 88' Studinski	Stadium: Kiryat Eliezer Stadium; Attendance: 5,000; Referee: Fritzner

24 December 1955 4	Maccabi Haifa	5–0	Maccabi Rehovot	Haifa
	Ben-Tzvi 8' (pen.); Held 42', 75'; S. Levi 67'; Hardy 86'			Stadium: Kiryat Eliezer Stadium; Attendance: 3,500; Referee: Fried

31 December 1955 5	Hapoel Tel Aviv	0–2	Maccabi Haifa	Tel Aviv
			22', 66' S. Levi	Stadium: Basa Stadium; Attendance: 8,000; Referee: Levichter

7 January 1956 6	Maccabi Jaffa	3–2	Maccabi Haifa	Tel Aviv
	Ghougasian 38', 78'; Miranda 61'		53' Hardy; 85' Almani	Stadium: Maccabi Jaffa Ground; Attendance: 3,000; Referee: Fried

14 January 1956 7	Beitar Tel Aviv	1–6	Maccabi Haifa	Tel Aviv
	Huli 90'		2', 38', 47' Georgiou; 27' Hardy; 51' Held; 84' S. Levi	Stadium: Maccabi Jaffa Ground; Referee: Werner

21 January 1956 8	Maccabi Haifa	5–0	Hapoel Haifa	Haifa
	Hardy 39'; S. Levi 60', 86', 89'; Almani 76'			Stadium: Kiryat Eliezer Stadium; Attendance: 6,500; Referee: Ben-Rubi

11 February 1956 9	Maccabi Haifa	1–3	Maccabi Petah Tikva	Haifa
	S. Levi 9'		16', 17' Spiegel; 67' Carmeli	Stadium: Kiryat Eliezer Stadium; Attendance: 5,537; Referee: Dudkevich

18 February 1956 10	Maccabi Haifa	0–2	Maccabi Netanya	Haifa
			43', 50' (pen.) I. Caspi	Stadium: Kiryat Eliezer Stadium; Referee: Fried

25 February 1956 11	Hapoel Ramat Gan	0–1	Maccabi Haifa	Givatayim
			36' Hardy	Stadium: HaMakhtesh Stadium; Referee: Fritzner

3 March 1956 12	Hapoel Petah Tikva	1–3	Maccabi Haifa	Petah Tikva
	Z. Ratzabi 33'		16', 55' S. Levi; 60' Hardy	Stadium: Hapoel Ground; Attendance: 4,000; Referee: Fritzner

10 March 1956 13	Maccabi Haifa	1–2	Hapoel Kfar Saba	Haifa
	Abramovich 31'		57' Tzahobel; 80' H. Glazer	Stadium: Kiryat Eliezer Stadium; Attendance: 4,000; Referee: Wackermann

17 March 1956 14	Maccabi Tel Aviv	1–1	Maccabi Haifa	Tel Aviv
	Y. Glazer 18'		13' S. Levi	Stadium: Basa Stadium; Attendance: 4,000; Referee: Moshe Cohen

24 March 1956 15	Maccabi Rehovot	0–3	Maccabi Haifa	Rehovot
			49' Held; 63', 76' Menchel	Stadium: Maccabi Ground; Referee: Rosenbaum

31 March 1956 16	Maccabi Haifa	2–2	Hapoel Tel Aviv	Haifa
	Ben-Tzvi 75' (pen.); Almani 83'		69' Michaelov; 88' Balut	Stadium: Kiryat Eliezer Stadium; Attendance: 6,000; Referee: Dudkevich

7 April 1956 17	Maccabi Haifa	5–1	Maccabi Jaffa	Haifa
	Held 10', 22', 87'; Menchel 45'; Hardy 67'		34' B. Cohen	Stadium: Kiryat Eliezer Stadium; Attendance: 4,000; Referee: Rosenbaum

14 April 1956 18	Maccabi Haifa	4–2	Beitar Tel Aviv	Haifa
	Hardy 7', 52'; Held 10', 55'		39' Gleit; 73' Huli	Stadium: Kiryat Eliezer Stadium; Attendance: 5,000; Referee: Hillman

22 April 1956 19	Hapoel Haifa	0–0	Maccabi Haifa	Haifa
				Stadium: Kiryat Eliezer Stadium; Attendance: 7,000; Referee: Sher

19 May 1956 20	Maccabi Petah Tikva	2–0	Maccabi Haifa	Petah Tikva
	Spiegel 35'; Scharf 72'			Stadium: Maccabi Ground, Petah Tikva

27 May 1956 21	Maccabi Netanya	3–1	Maccabi Haifa	Netanya
	Shrager 9'; Orenstein 50'; Statzki 64'		88' (o.g.) H. Meller	Stadium: Sar-Tov Stadium; Attendance: 1,500; Referee: Sher

2 June 1956 22	Maccabi Haifa	3–0	Hapoel Ramat Gan	Haifa
	S. Levi 32'; Menchel 38'; Hardy 65'			Stadium: Kiryat Eliezer Stadium; Referee: Werner

==== Results by match ====
Round	1	2	3	4	5	6	7	8	9	10	11	12	13	14	15	16	17	18	19	20	21	22
Result	L	W	L	W	W	L	W	W	L	L	W	W	L	D	W	D	W	W	D	L	L	W
Position	10	5	7	6	5	6	4	4	5	6	5	5	6	5	5	5	5	4	5	5	5	5

Updated to match(es) played on 28 July 1956. Source: IFA
W = Win; D = Draw; L = Loss

=== State Cup ===
27 August 1955 QF	Maccabi Haifa	4–0	Hapoel Haifa	Haifa
	Georgiou 36'; Hardy 37'; Held 53'; Fuchs 71'	Report (p. 8)		Stadium: Kiryat Haim Stadium; Attendance: 3,000; Referee: Ben-Rubi

22 October 1955 SF	Maccabi Haifa	0–5	Maccabi Tel Aviv	Petah Tikva
		Report (p. 8)	36' Merimovich; 40', 55', 84' Studinski; 89' Glazer	Stadium: Hapoel Ground; Attendance: 2,500; Referee: Ben-Rubi

=== Shapira Cup ===
While the promotion playoffs and the State Cup were being played in October and November, two cup competitions were organized by Liga Leumit Clubs, the second edition of the Shapira Cup, and the Netanya 25th Anniversary Cup. Maccabi Haifa, Hapoel Petah Tikva, Maccabi Tel Aviv and Hapoel Tel Aviv played for the Shapira Cup, named after former Hapoel Tel Aviv treasurer Yosef Shapira. The competition was designed to be played as a double round-robin tournament. However, the competition was delayed after the teams played only two matches each. The third-round matches were postponed due to weather conditions and the 1954–55 Israel State Cup final, which involved Maccabi Tel Aviv and Hapoel Petah Tikva. As league matches started on 3 December 1955, the competition was abandoned altogether.

==== Table ====
Pos	Team	Pld	W	D	L	GF	GA	GR	Pts
1	Maccabi Tel Aviv	2	2	0	0	7	4	1.750	4
2	Maccabi Haifa	2	1	0	1	7	7	1.000	2
3	Hapoel Petah Tikva	2	1	0	1	6	6	1.000	2
4	Hapoel Tel Aviv	2	0	0	2	3	6	0.500	0

Source: Hadshot HaSport, p. 1

27 August 1955 1	Maccabi Haifa	4–2	Hapoel Petah Tikva	Tel Aviv
	Ben-Tzvi 60' (pen.); Parizat 69' (o.g.); S. Levi 88'; Held 89'		24' Kofman; 40' Stelmach	Stadium: Basa Stadium; Attendance: 5,000; Referee: Dudkevich

5 November 1955 2	Maccabi Tel Aviv	5–3	Maccabi Haifa	Tel Aviv
	Glazer 6', 15', 17', 19'; Miremovich 78'	Report (p. 8)	8', 89' Hardy; 10' Menchel	Stadium: Basa Stadium; Attendance: 5,500; Referee: Moshe Cohen
