= List of Maccabi Tel Aviv F.C. seasons =

This is a list of seasons played by Maccabi Tel Aviv Football Club in Israeli and European football, from 1928 (when the club joined the newly founded EIFA) to the most recent completed season. It details the club's achievements in major competitions, and the top scorers for each season. Top scorers in bold were also the top scorers in the Israeli league that season. Records of minor competitions such as the Lilian Cup are not included due to them being considered of less importance than the State Cup and the Toto Cup.

The club has won the League championship 25 times, the State Cup 24 times, the Toto Cup nine times and Asian Champion Club Tournament twice. The club has never been out of the top division of Israeli football.

== History ==
Maccabi Tel Aviv Football Club was established in 1906 in the port city of Jaffa before relocating to the newly established Tel Aviv in 1909. In 1928 the club joined the EIFA and competed in its competitions ever since, winning its first cup in 1929 and league championship in 1936. The club represented Israel in the Asian Champion Club Tournament in 1969, and 1970, winning the title in both attempts. As Israel joined UEFA, in 1992, the club participated in UEFA tournaments, reaching the Champions League group stage in 2004–05 and 2015–16. In 2014–15, the club became the first club in Israel to win all three major domestic titles, the League Championship, the State Cup and the Toto Cup in one season.

== Seasons ==
Season	League									State Cup	League Cup	International (Asia/Europe)	Top goalscorer (Note: Goals in all competitions (Liga Leumit or Liga Al, State Cup, Toto Cup and European) are counted.)	
Season	Division	P	W	D	L	F	A	Pts	Pos	State Cup	League Cup	International (Asia/Europe)	Name	Goals
1927–28	–	–	–	–	–	–	–	–	–	QF	–	–		
1928–29	–	–	–	–	–	–	–	–	–	Winners	–	–		
1929–30	–	–	–	–	–	–	–	–	–	Winners (Note: Maccabi Tel Aviv entered two teams to the competition. In the first round its B team had beaten Maccabi Zikhron Ya'akov 4–0, while it’s a team forfeited its away match against Hapoel Haifa B team. The club then registered its entire A squad to appear for the B team for the rest of the competition, which the B team won.)	–	–		
1930–31	Pal. League (Note: The 1930–31 league season was abandoned after several weeks due to tensions between the British Mandate government and the Jewish community following the publication of the Passfield white paper.)	6	5	1	0	27	10	11	1st	–	–	–		
1931–32	Pal. League	15	7	2	6	37	38	16	5th	QF	–	–		
1932–33	–	–	–	–	–	–	–	–	–	Winners	–	–		
1933–34	Pal. League	13	5	3	5	23	21	13	3rd	Final	–	–		
1934–35	Pal. League (Note: The 1934–35 league season was stopped to allow Maccabi club to prepare for the 1935 Maccabiah Games and wasn't renewed due to disagreement between Maccabi and Hapoel)	6	2	1	3	10	10	5	5th	QF (Note: Maccabi Tel Aviv withdrew from the cup and forfeited its quarter-final match against Maccabi Petah Tikva.)	–	–		
1935–36	Pal. League (Note: The 1935–36 league season was held from7 December 1935 to 18 December 1936.)	10	7	2	1	21	9	16	1st	– (Note: After three matches played in the first round the competition was abandoned due to the Arab Revolt.)	–	–		
1936–37	Pal. League	10	7	2	1	21	9	16	1st	SF	–	–		
1937–38	Pal. League	8	7	0	1	28	10	14	1st	Final	–	–		
1938–39	Pal. League (Note: The 1938–39 league season was abandoned after playing one round of matches due to the Arab Revolt.)	11	7	3	1	44	13	17	2nd	SF	–	–		
1939–40	Pal. League	14	8	2	4	46	14	18	3rd	Final	–	–		
1940–41	–	–	–	–	–	–	–	–	–	Winners	–	–		
1941–42	Pal. League; Southern (Note: The 1941–42 league season was held in three regional divisions followed by a play-off. The league was completed during the 1942–43 season.)	26	21	1	4	82	26	43	2nd	SF (Note: The club fielded four ineligible players in its quarter-final match against Shabab al-Arab Haifa. The quarter-final result was confirmed, with the club set to play Maccabi Haifa in the semi-final, however, the club was thrown out of the competition due to fielding ineligible players and the semi-final was given to Maccabi Haifa.)	–	–		
1942–43	Pal. League playoff	4	4	0	0	13	0	8	1st	R3	–	–		
1943–44	Pal. League	21	13	2	6	62	27	28	4th	Round of 16 (Note: The 1944 cup competitions began on 5 February 1944 and was completed during the following season, on 13 January 1945.)	–	–		
1944–45	Pal. League; Northern	11	4	3	4	19	16	11	4th	Round of 16	–	–		
1945–46	–	–	–	–	–	–	–	–	–	Winners	–	–		
1946–47	Pal. League	26	22	2	2	116	30	46	1st	Winners	–	–		
1947–48	Pal. League (Note: The 1947–48 league was abandoned due to the 1948 Arab–Israeli War.)	5	5	0	0	26	4	10	2nd	–	–	–		
1948–49	Isr. League (Note: The 1949–50 league began in May 1949 and ended on 24 June 1950.)	24	21	1	2	103	18	43	1st	QF (Note: The 1949 cup competition was delayed by appeals after the completion of the quarter-finals. After settling the appeals three further matches were played in February 1951, and the competition was abandoned.)	–	–	Eli Fuchs; Aharon Sidi; Hazkelevich	6
1949–50	Isr. League	24	21	1	2	103	18	43	1st	QF	–	–		
1950–51	–	–	–	–	–	–	–	–	–	QF	–	–		
1951–52	Alef	22	18	2	2	89	18	38	1st	Final	–	–		
1952–53	–	–	–	–	–	–	–	–	–	Winners	–	–		
1953–54	Alef	22	16	6	0	59	11	38	1st	Winners	–	–		
1954–55	Alef	26	17	4	5	84	28	38	2nd	Winners	–	–		
1955–56	Leumit	22	13	6	3	47	16	32	1st	–	–	–		
1956–57	Leumit	18	10	3	5	36	20	23	3rd	SF	–	–		
1957–58	Leumit	22	13	9	0	50	12	35	1st	Winners	–	–		
1958–59	Leumit	22	13	5	4	38	19	30	3rd	Winners	R1	–		
1959–60	Leumit	22	12	6	4	52	35	30	2nd	Round of 16	–	–		
1960–61	Leumit	22	12	2	8	34	29	26	4th	Round of 16	–	–		
1961–62	Leumit	22	5	7	10	22	34	17	10th	Final	–	–		
1962–63	Leumit	22	7	7	8	22	26	21	7th	Round of 16	–	–		
1963–64	Leumit	28	13	5	10	40	32	31	5th	Winners	–	–		
1964–65	Leumit	30	14	5	11	46	31	33	4th	Winners	–	–		
1965–66	Leumit	30	14	6	10	45	29	34	2nd	QF	–	–		
1966–67	Leumit	60	30	18	12	88	50	78	1st	Winners	–	–		
1967–68	Leumit	60	30	18	12	88	50	78	1st	Round of 16	–	–		
1968–69	Leumit	30	18	7	5	45	23	43	2nd	SF	Group	Winners		
1969–70	Leumit	30	15	9	6	51	21	39	1st	Winners	–	–		
1970–71	Leumit	30	8	13	9	33	35	29	10th	SF	–	Winners		
1971–72	Leumit	30	18	9	3	45	20	45	1st	SF	–	–		
1972–73	Leumit	30	8	17	5	31	23	33	4th	QF	Group	–		
1973–74	Leumit	30	12	11	7	36	18	35	2nd	SF	–	–		
1974–75	Leumit	30	14	7	9	26	19	35	4th	R4	–	–		
1975–76	Leumit	34	13	9	12	38	34	35	7th	Final	QF	–		
1976–77	Leumit	30	16	10	4	47	26	42	1st	Winners	–	–		
1977–78	Leumit	26	12	8	6	44	29	32	3rd	Round of 16	–	–		
1978–79	Leumit	30	18	8	4	47	16	44	1st	Final	–	–		
1979–80	Leumit	30	9	14	7	33	35	32	5th	QF	–	–		
1980–81	Leumit	30	10	12	8	33	33	32	8th	R7	–	–		
1981–82	Leumit	30	10	10	10	26	32	30	8th	Round of 16	–	–		
1982–83	Leumit	30	10	11	9	27	23	41	5th	final	–	–		
1983–84	Leumit	30	10	11	9	41	34	41	5th	SF	–	–		
1984–85	Leumit	30	9	15	6	34	23	42	7th	Round of 16	Group	–		
1985–86	Leumit	30	16	9	5	48	27	57	3rd	SF	SF	–		
1986–87	Leumit	30	12	11	7	43	25	47	3rd	Winners	SF	–		
1987–88	Leumit	31	8	12	11	43	43	36	12th	Winners	Group	–		
1988–89	Leumit	33	11	11	11	44	44	42 (Note: Two points were deducted for violations of the Budgetary Regulations)	8th	Round of 16	SF	–		
1989–90	Leumit	32	14	6	12	48	44	48	4th	Round of 16	Group	–		
1990–91	Leumit	32	9	11	12	43	53	38	5th	Round of 16	Group	–		
1991–92	Leumit	32	23	6	3	82	29	75	1st	Final	Final	–		
1992–93	Leumit	33	18	8	7	74	36	62	2nd	Final	Winners	CL, R1		
1993–94	Leumit	39	27	7	5	80	36	88	2nd	Winners	SF	–		
1994–95	Leumit	30	19	6	5	59	27	63	1st	Round of 16	Final	CWC, R1		
1995–96	Leumit	30	23	5	2	59	16	74	1st	Winners	Group	CL, QR		
1996–97	Leumit	30	13	7	10	47	34	46	6th	Final	SF	CL, QR		
1997–98	Leumit	30	10	9	11	42	35	39	6th	Round of 16	Final	–		
1998–99	Leumit	30	20	3	7	77	32	63	2nd	Round of 16	Winners	–		
1999–2000	Premier	39	18	8	13	66	42	58 (Note: The club four points deducted as Kfir Edri tested positive for Ephedrine.)	6th	Round of 16	R2	–		
2000–01	Premier	38	19	11	8	73	33	68	4th	Winners	R2	–		
2001–02	Premier	33	15	12	6	43	24	57	3rd	Winners	SF	UEFA Cup, R2		
2002–03	Premier	33	22	3	8	66	31	69	1st	SF	SF	UEFA Cup, R1		
2003–04	Premier	33	16	9	8	35	22	57	2nd	QF	Group	CL, 2QR		
2004–05	Premier	33	10	10	13	32	42	40	8th	Winners	QF	CL, Group		
2005–06	Premier	33	11	11	11	35	37	44	6th	Round of 16	SF	UEFA Cup, 2QR		
2006–07	Premier	33	15	11	7	42	28	54 (Note: The club two points deducted.)	3rd	Round of 16	Group	–	Avi Nimni	10
2007–08	Premier	33	11	8	14	42	42	41	6th	R9	QF	UEFA Cup, 2QR	(France) Yannick Kamanan	12
2008–09	Premier	33	11	11	11	36	35	44	6th	R9	Winners	–	Maor Buzaglo	9
2009–10	Premier	35	17	9	9	52	35	34 (Note: Maccabi Tel Aviv achieved 52 points in the regular season, which were halved at the beginning of the play-offs. The club scored 8 more points during the play-offs for a total of 60 points.)	3rd	Round of 16	SF	–	Yossi Shivhon	8
2010–11	Premier	35	18	6	11	53	40	35 (Note: Maccabi Tel Aviv achieved 50 points in the regular seasons, which were halved at the beginning of the play-offs. The club scored 10 more points during the play-offs for a total of 60 points.)	3rd	R8	SF	EL, POR	(Israel) Eliran Atar	18
2011–12	Premier	37	16	7	14	55	42	55	6th	R8	QF	EL, Group	(Israel) Eliran Atar	13
2012–13	Premier	36	25	5	6	78	30	80	1st	Round of 16	QF	–	(Israel) Eliran Atar	22
2013–14	Premier	36	26	6	4	76	30	84	1st	R8	–	CL, 3QR; EL, Round of 32	(Israel) Eran Zahavi	29
2014–15	Premier	36	21	9	6	67	32	70 (Note: A match between Maccabi Tel Aviv and Hapoel Tel Aviv was abandoned and was given as a 0–0 with no points awarded.)	1st	Winners	Winners	CL,3QR; EL, POR	(Israel) Eran Zahavi	27
2015–16	Premier	36	24	9	3	73	24	83	2nd	Final	Group	CL, Group	(Israel) Eran Zahavi	35
2016–17	Premier	36	22	6	8	61	28	72	2nd	Final	QF	EL, Group	(Iceland) Viðar Kjartansson	24
2017–18	Premier	36	21	8	7	60	33	71	2nd	Round of 16	Winners	EL, Group	(Iceland) Viðar Kjartansson	21
2018–19	Premier	36	27	8	1	77	17	89	1st	Semifinals	Winners	EL, POR	(Israel) Eliran Atar	17
2019–20	Premier	36	26	9	1	63	10	87	1st	Eighth Round	2nd	SQR	(Israel) Yonatan Cohen	13
2020–21	Premier	36	21	12	3	65	33	75	2nd	Winners	Winners	POR, Round of 32	(Israel) Yonatan Cohen	14
2021–22	Premier	36	20	9	7	63	38	69	3rd	SF	6th	ECL, KO	(Croatia) Stipe Perica	17
2022–23	Premier	36	21	10	5	69	23	73	3rd	SF	7th	POR	(Israel) Eran Zahavi	15
2023–24	Premier	36	26	7	3	75	25	85	1st	QF	Winners	SQR	(Israel) Eran Zahavi	20
2024–25	Premier	36	24	8	4	86	36	80	1st	Round of 16	Winners	CL, SQR; EL, League phase	(Israel) Dor Turgeman	15

== Key ==
- P = Played
- W = Games won
- D = Games drawn
- L = Games lost
- F = Goals for
- A = Goals against
- Pts = Points
- Pos = Final position
- Leumit = Liga Leumit (National League)
- Artzit = Liga Artzit (Nationwide League)
- Premier = Liga Al (Premier League)
- Pal. League = Palestine League
- F = Final
- Group = Group stage
- QF = Quarter-finals
- QR1 = First Qualifying Round
- QR2 = Second Qualifying Round
- QR3 = Third Qualifying Round
- QR4 = Fourth Qualifying Round
- RInt = Intermediate Round
- R1 = Round 1
- R2 = Round 2
- R3 = Round 3
- R4 = Round 4
- R5 = Round 5
- R6 = Round 6
- SF = Semi-finals

Champions	Runners-up	Promoted	Relegated
