= 1954–55 Beitar Jerusalem F.C. season =

Beitar Jerusalem
1954–55 season
- Manager: Simon Elfasi; Egon Pollak
- Stadium: YMCA Stadium
- Liga Alef: not completed
- State Cup: Round 3
- Top goalscorer: League: Simon Elfasi; Israel Yehezkel (11); All: Simon Elfasi; Israel Yehezkel (11)

The 1954–55 Beitar Jerusalem season was the club's 19th season since its establishment, in 1936, and 7th since the establishment of the State of Israel.

During the season, the club competed in Liga Alef (top division) and the State Cup.

== Review and events ==
- At the beginning of the season, top Beitar teams, Beitar Tel Aviv and Beitar Jerusalem competed for the Lifa Livyatan Memorial Cup, named after a late Beitar journalist. In the first match, played on 28 August 1954, the teams tied 3–3, and the match was replayed on 12 October 1954, Beitar Tel Aviv winning 5–2.

== Match results ==
=== Legend ===
Win Draw Loss

=== Liga Alef ===
League matches began on 6 February 1955, and by the time the season ended, only 20 rounds of matches were completed, delaying the end of the league season to the next season.

==== League table (as of 2 July 1955) ====
Pos	Team	Pld	W	D	L	GF	GA	GR	Pts
10	Hapoel Haifa	20	6	6	8	31	35	0.886	18
11	Hapoel Ramat Gan	20	7	3	10	23	27	0.852	17
12	Beitar Jerusalem	20	5	5	10	27	47	0.574	15
13	Hapoel Hadera	20	6	2	12	24	37	0.649	14
14	Hapoel Balfouria	20	2	2	16	23	92	0.250	6

Updated to match(es) played on 2 July 1955. Source: Hadshot HaSport, 3 July 1955 (in Hebrew)

==== Matches ====
5 February 1955 1	Hapoel Haifa	1–1	Beitar Jerusalem	Haifa
	M. Simantiris 88'	Report (p. 8)	Hasson 27'	Stadium: Kiryat Haim Stadium; Attendance: 2,000; Referee: Ben-Rubi

12 February 1955 2	Beitar Jerusalem	1–4	Maccabi Tel Aviv	Jerusalem
	Yehezkel 15'	Report (p. 8)	27' (pen.) Schneor; 36', 71' Glazer; 86' (o.g.) Mizrahi	Stadium: YMCA Stadium; Attendance: 8,000; Referee: Levichter

19 February 1955 3	Beitar Jerusalem	4–3	Maccabi Rehovot	Jerusalem
	Yehezkel 16', 36'; Elfasi 42', 78'	Report (p. 8)	14', 43' Litvak; 28' Steuermann	Stadium: YMCA Stadium; Attendance: 5,000; Referee: Werner

26 February 1955 4	Beitar Tel Aviv	4–0	Beitar Jerusalem	Tel Aviv
	Osherov 61', 83'; Elmaliah 61', 75'	Report (p. 8)		Stadium: Basa Stadium; Attendance: 4,000; Referee: Ben-Rubi

5 March 1955 5	Beitar Jerusalem	2–2	Hapoel Tel Aviv	Jerusalem
	Elfasi 4'; Yehezkel 70'	Report (p. 8)	23' Balut; 82' Michaelov	Stadium: YMCA Stadium; Attendance: 9,000; Referee: Sher

12 March 1955 6	Beitar Jerusalem	1–0	Maccabi Haifa	Jerusalem
	Elfasi 65'	Report		Stadium: YMCA Stadium; Attendance: 6,000; Referee: Avraham Dudkevich

19 March 1955 7	Maccabi Petah Tikva	2–0	Beitar Jerusalem	Petah Tikva
	Turkenitz 28' (pen.); A. Carmeli 54'	Report (p. 8)		Stadium: Maccabi Ground; Attendance: 1,700; Referee: Frizner

1 April 1955 8	Hapoel Petah Tikva	2–0	Beitar Jerusalem	Petah Tikva
	Zelikovich 21'; Segal 85'			Stadium: Hapoel Ground; Attendance: 1,500; Referee: Klein

9 April 1955 9	Beitar Jerusalem	1–0	Hapoel Kfar Saba	Jerusalem
	Elfasi 13'	Report (p. 8)		Stadium: YMCA Stadium; Attendance: 5,000; Referee: Rosenbaum

13 April 1955 10	Hapoel Hadera	2–0	Beitar Jerusalem	Hadera
	Piterman 21'; Halfon 52'	Report (p. 4)		Stadium: Hapoel Ground; Attendance: 1,500; Referee: Zilberman

16 April 1955 11	Hapoel Ramat Gan	3–1	Beitar Jerusalem	Givatayim
	Kurik 19', 79'; Kirschenberg 90' (pen.)	Report (p. 8)	Yehezkel 65'	Stadium: HaMakhtesh Stadium; Attendance: 2,000; Referee: Yonas

23 April 1955 12	Beitar Jerusalem	6–1	Hapoel Balfouria	Jerusalem
	Yehezkel 20', 49', 53', 65', 68'; Zion 54'	Report (p. 8)	Kochavi 90'	Stadium: YMCA Stadium; Attendance: 5,000; Referee: Asa

30 April 1955 13	Maccabi Netanya	3–2	Beitar Jerusalem	Netanya
	M. Cohen 38', 75'; H. Meller 62'	Report (p. 8)	80' Zion; 82' (pen.) Stern	Stadium: Sar-Tov Stadium; Attendance: 3,000; Referee: Frizner

14 May 1955 14	Beitar Jerusalem	3–0	Hapoel Haifa	Jerusalem
	Elfasi 22', 25' (pen.), 72'	Report (p. 8)		Stadium: YMCA Stadium; Attendance: 6,000; Referee: Rosenbaum

21 May 1955 15	Maccabi Tel Aviv	6–0	Beitar Jerusalem	Tel Aviv
	Glazer 16', 81'; Studinski 58', 69'; Levi 73'; Stiemer 87' (o.g.)	Report (p. 8)		Stadium: Basa Stadium; Attendance: 5,000; Referee: Werner

4 June 1955 16	Maccabi Rehovot	4–0	Beitar Jerusalem	Rehovot
	Litvak 22', 53' (pen.); Vider 49'; Schmilovich 81'	Report (p. 8)		Stadium: Maccabi Ground; Attendance: 1,200; Referee: Zahavi

11 June 1955 17	Beitar Jerusalem	3–3	Beitar Tel Aviv	Jerusalem
	Hasson 8'; Yehezkel 12'; Elfasi 38'	Report (p. 8)	61' (pen.), 80', 85' Elmaliah	Stadium: YMCA Stadium; Attendance: 5,000; Referee: Metzler

18 June 1955 18	Hapoel Tel Aviv	1–1	Beitar Jerusalem	Tel Aviv
	Balut 24' (pen.)	Report (p. 8)	73' elfasi	Stadium: Basa Stadium; Attendance: 6,000; Referee: Markovich

26 June 1955 19	Maccabi Haifa	5–0	Beitar Jerusalem	Haifa
	Held 22', 44', 63'; Georgiou 54'; Fuchs 66'	Report		Stadium: Kiryat Haim Stadium; Attendance: 2,500; Referee: Ben-Rubi

3 July 1955 20	Beitar Jerusalem	1–1	Maccabi Petah Tikva	Jerusalem
	Elfasi 85' (pen.)	Report (p. 8)	32' Bernard	Stadium: YMCA Stadium; Attendance: 7,000; Referee: Cohen

==== Results by match ====
Match	1	2	3	4	5	6	7	8	9	10	11	12	13	14	15	16	17	18	19	20
Result	D	L	W	L	D	W	L	L	W	L	L	W	L	W	L	L	D	D	L	D
Position	8	10	7	9	11	8	10	12	8	10	12	9	10	8	11	12	12	13	13	12

Updated to match(es) played on 3 July 1955. Source: 2 Dear Points
W = Win; D = Draw; L = Loss

=== State Cup ===
26 March 1955 Round 3	Hapoel Tel Aviv	5–0	Beitar Jerusalem	Tel Aviv
	Yehudayoff 4', 13', 69', 84'; Rosenbaum 8'			Stadium: Basa Stadium
