= 1954–55 Maccabi Haifa F.C. season =

Maccabi Haifa
1954–55 season
- Manager: Eli Fuchs
- Stadium: Kiryat Haim Stadium
- Liga Alef: not completed
- State Cup: not completed
- Top goalscorer: League: Yisha'ayahu Held (12); All: Yisha'ayahu Held (18)

The 1954–55 Maccabi Haifa season was the club's 42nd season since its establishment, in 1913, and 7th since the establishment of the State of Israel.

During the season, the club competed in Liga Alef (top division) and the State Cup.

== Review and events ==
- Although league matches from the previous season ended on 13 March 1954, the confirmation of the league's final standings was delayed, as a match between Maccabi Haifa and Maccabi Petah Tikva, which was played on 26 December 1953 and ended with a 3–2 win for Haifa, was claimed to be fixed, to allow Maccabi Haifa to win. Eventually, on 10 January 1955, the IFA decided to replay the match in a neutral venue, Maccabi Haifa won the rematch 4–1 and secured their spot in the top division.
- The club played one international friendly match during the season, against APOEL FC, on 9 April 1955. Maccabi Haifa won the match 2–0, with goals scored by Held and Hardy.

== Match Results ==
=== Legend ===
Win Draw Loss

=== Liga Alef ===
League matches began on 6 February 1955, and by the time the season, only 20 rounds of matches were completed, delaying the end of the league season to the next season. Before the start of the season, Maccabi Haifa played one match to complete the 1953–54 Liga Alef season.

==== League table (as of 2 July 1955) ====
Pos	Club	P	W	D	L	GF	GA	GR	Pts
4	Beitar Tel Aviv	20	9	5	6	48	36	1.33	23
5	Maccabi Petah Tikva	20	8	6	6	27	24	1.13	22
6	Maccabi Haifa	20	8	5	7	36	29	1.24	21
7	Maccabi Netanya	20	7	7	6	39	39	1.00	21
8	Hapoel Kfar Saba	20	6	6	8	29	30	0.97	18

==== Matches ====
===== 1953–54 Liga Alef =====
15 January 1955	Maccabi Haifa	4–1	Maccabi Petah Tikva	Kfar Saba
	Held 1', 58'; Hardy 42', 65'	Report	17' Scharf	Stadium: Hapoel Ground; Attendance: 2,500; Referee: Aharon Werner

===== 1954–55 Liga Alef =====
5 February 1955 1	Hapoel Kfar Saba	1–0	Maccabi Haifa	Kfar Saba
	H. Glazer 66'	Report		Stadium: Hapoel Ground; Attendance: 2,000; Referee: Moshe Cohen

12 February 1955 2	Maccabi Haifa	1–3	Hapoel Ramat Gan	Haifa
	Frankfurter 28'	Report	50' Schtalzer; 61', 71' Manar	Stadium: Kiryat Haim Stadium; Attendance: 2,000; Referee: Reuven Frisner

19 February 1955 3	Maccabi Netanya	4–4	Maccabi Haifa	Netanya
	M. Cohen 11', 83'; I. Caspi 56' (pen.); Y. Spiegel 71'	Report	2', 30', 43' Hardy; 86' (pen.) Ben-Tzvi	Stadium: Sar-Tov Stadium; Attendance: 1,000; Referee: Silbermann

26 February 1955 4	Maccabi Haifa	1–3	Maccabi Tel Aviv	Haifa
	Ben-Tzvi 73' (pen.)	Report	30', 70' Israeli; 90' Glazer	Stadium: Kiryat Haim Stadium; Attendance: 3,000; Referee: Cohen

5 March 1955 5	Beitar Tel Aviv	0–2	Maccabi Haifa	Tel Aviv
		Report	37' Daniel; 62' Held	Stadium: Basa Stadium; Attendance: 2,000; Referee: Frisner

12 March 1955 6	Beitar Jerusalem	1–0	Maccabi Haifa	Jerusalem
	Elfasi 65'	Report		Stadium: YMCA Stadium; Attendance: 6,000; Referee: Avraham Dudkevich

19 March 1955 7	Maccabi Haifa	1–3	Hapoel Petah Tikva	Haifa
	E. Fuchs 81'	Report	3', 80' Stelmach; 61' Zelikovich	Stadium: Kiryat Haim Stadium; Attendance: 4,000; Referee: Werner

1 April 1955 8	Hapoel Hadera	1–3	Maccabi Haifa	Hadera
	Piterman 24'	Report	14', 77' Held; 85' Tenenmaum	Stadium: Hapoel Ground; Attendance: 1,000; Referee: Werner

7 April 1955 9	Maccabi Haifa	1–1	Hapoel Balfouria	Haifa
	Eichenboim 17' (o.g.)	Report	83' Tal	Stadium: Kiryat Haim Stadium; Attendance: 3,000; Referee: Halperin

13 April 1955 10	Hapoel Haifa	4–0	Maccabi Haifa	Haifa
	Schneid 18', 63'; Shamir 43'; Kramer 72'	Report		Stadium: Kiryat Haim Stadium; Attendance: 3,500; Referee: Ben-Rubi

16 April 1955 11	Maccabi Haifa	4–0	Maccabi Rehovot	Haifa
	Hardy 6', 44'; Tenenbaum 8'; Held 53'	Report (p. 8)		Stadium: Kiryat Haim Stadium; Attendance: 2,500; Referee: Moshe Cohen

23 April 1955 12	Hapoel Tel Aviv	1–1	Maccabi Haifa	Tel Aviv
	Alaluf 88'	Report	73' Hardy	Stadium: Basa Stadium; Attendance: 3,000; Referee: Hillman

30 April 1955 13	Maccabi Haifa	0–1	Maccabi Petah Tikva	Haifa
		Report	35' A. Carmeli	Stadium: Kiryat Haim Stadium; Attendance: 3,500; Referee: Dudkevich

14 May 1955 14	Maccabi Haifa	2–1	Hapoel Kfar Saba	Haifa
	Georgiou 18', 71'	Report	69' H. Glazer	Stadium: Kiryat Haim Stadium; Attendance: 3,000; Referee: Ben-Rubi

21 May 1955 15	Hapoel Ramat Gan	0–1	Maccabi Haifa	Givatayim
		Report	47' Held	Stadium: HaMakhtesh Stadium; Attendance: 2,000; Referee: Dudkevich

4 June 1955 16	Maccabi Haifa	6–2	Maccabi Netanya	Haifa
	Hardy 6'; Tenenbaum 47'; Ben-Tzvi 52' (pen.); Held 54'; Georgiou 74'; Fuchs 80'	Report	44' M. Cohen; 55' Meller	Stadium: Kiryat Haim Stadium; Attendance: 3,500; Referee: Rozenbaum

11 June 1955 17	Maccabi Tel Aviv	1–2	Maccabi Haifa	Tel Aviv
	Glazer 77'	Report	51' Tenenmaum; 62' (pen.) Ben-Tzvi	Stadium: Basa Stadium; Attendance: 5,000; Referee: Fried

18 June 1955 18	Maccabi Haifa	1–1	Beitar Tel Aviv	Haifa
	Hardy 23'	Report	52' Kasuto	Stadium: Kiryat Haim Stadium; Attendance: 3,500

26 June 1955 19	Maccabi Haifa	5–0	Beitar Jerusalem	Haifa
	Held 22', 44', 63'; Georgiou 54'; Fuchs 66'	Report		Stadium: Kiryat Haim Stadium; Attendance: 2,500; Referee: Ben-Rubi

3 July 1955 20	Hapoel Petah Tikva	1–1	Maccabi Haifa	Petah Tikva
	Y. Vissoker 15' (pen.)	Report	75' Held	Stadium: Hapoel Ground; Attendance: 2,000; Referee: Rosenbaum

==== Results by match ====
Match	1	2	3	4	5	6	7	8	9	10	11	12	13	14	15	16	17	18	19	20
Result	L	L	D	L	W	L	L	W	D	L	W	D	L	W	W	W	W	D	W	D
Position	12	12	12	12	12	12	13	13	12	13	9	11	11	10	8	6	7	6	6	6

Updated to match(es) played on 3 July 1955. Source: 2 Dear Points
W = Win; D = Draw; L = Loss

=== State Cup ===
26 March 1955 Round 3	Maccabi Tel Aviv	9–1	Hapoel Nes Tziona	Haifa
	Held 16', 20', 30', 83'; Hardy 58', 65', 85'; Georgiou 66'; Tenenmaum 63'	Report	Shohatovich 43'	Stadium: Kiryat Haim Stadium; Attendance: 1,000; Referee: Stern

28 May 1955 Round 4	Maccabi Haifa	9–0	Orthodox Haifa	Haifa
	Georgiou 11'; Fuchs 25', 26', 27', 53 ' Almani 63', 70'; Held 72', 84'	Report		Stadium: Kiryat Haim Stadium; Attendance: 1,000; Referee: Medler
