= 1955–56 Maccabi Tel Aviv F.C. season =

Maccabi Tel Aviv
1955–56 season
- Manager: Jerry Beit haLevi
- Stadium: Basa Stadium, Tel Aviv
- Liga Alef (1955) Liga Leumit (1956): 2nd Winners
- State Cup: Winners
- Top goalscorer: League: Yosef Merimovich (12); All: Yosef Merimovich (16)

The 1955–56 Maccabi Tel Aviv season was the club's 50th season since its establishment in 1906, and 8th since the establishment of the State of Israel.

At the start of the season, the league which started during the previous season was completed, with the club finishing as runners-up, missing on championship in the last round. The new league season, with the top division being re-named Liga Leumit, began on 3 December 1955 and was completed on 3 June 1956, with the club winning the championship, its 8th championship title.

During the season, the club also competed in the State Cup, which was also carried over the summer break. The club eliminated Hapoel Hadera and Maccabi Haifa to reach the cup final against Hapoel Petah Tikva. Maccabi Tel Aviv won the match 3–1 and won its 8th State Cup.

== Match Results ==
=== Legend ===
Win Draw Loss

=== International friendly matches ===
During the season Maccabi Tel Aviv played two international friendly matches, losing both.

8 February 1956	Maccabi Tel Aviv	0–2	FK Sarajevo	Tel Aviv
		Davar (in Hebrew)	25' Pašić; 32' Biogradlić	Stadium: Basa Stadium; Attendance: 5,000; Referee: Werner

23 June 1956	Maccabi Tel Aviv	0–2	First Vienna	Tel Aviv
			27' Jericha; 47' Pichler	Stadium: Basa Stadium; Attendance: 8,000; Referee: Ben Rubi

=== 1954–55 Liga Alef ===
The league began on 6 February 1955, and by the time the previous season ended, only 20 rounds of matches were completed, with the final 6 rounds being played during September and October 1955.

==== Final table ====
Pos	Club	P	W	D	L	GF	GA	Gr	Pts	Notes
1	Hapoel Petah Tikva	26	18	4	4	68	23	2.96	40	Champions
2	Maccabi Tel Aviv	26	17	4	5	84	28	3.00	38	
3	Hapoel Tel Aviv	26	12	9	5	49	23	2.13	33	
4	Maccabi Netanya	26	13	7	6	54	43	1.26	33	
5	Beitar Tel Aviv	26	12	5	9	64	47	1.36	29	

==== Matches ====
3 September 1955 21	Maccabi Tel Aviv	6–0	Hapoel Haifa	Tel Aviv
	Merimovich 25', 54', 61', 75'; R. Levi 28'; Studinski 78'	Report (p. 8)		Stadium: Basa Stadium; Attendance: 3,000; Referee: Ben-Rubi

10 September 1955 22	Maccabi Rehovot	2–1	Maccabi Tel Aviv	Rehovot
	Herschkovitz 2'; Schmilovich 7'	Report (p. 8)	70' Merimovich	Stadium: Maccabi Ground; Attendance: 1,800; Referee: Dudkevich

24 September 1955 23	Hapoel Tel Aviv	2–2	Maccabi Tel Aviv	Tel Aviv
	Rosenbaum 60', 63'	Report (p. 8)	32' Israeli; 37' Glazer	Stadium: Basa Stadium; Attendance: 8,000; Referee: Werner

1 October 1955 24	Maccabi Petah Tikva	2–1	Maccabi Tel Aviv	Petah Tikva
	Rabinson 2'; Turkenitz 61' (pen.)	Report (p. 8)	80' Israeli	Stadium: Maccabi Ground; Attendance: 3,000; Referee: Markovich

8 October 1955 25	Maccabi Tel Aviv	2–1	Hapoel Kfar Saba	Tel Aviv
	Reznik 72'; Studinski 89'	Report (p. 8)	58' (pen.) Bulman	Stadium: Basa Stadium; Attendance: 5,000; Referee: Dudkevich

15 October 1955 26	Hapoel Ramat Gan	1–4	Maccabi Tel Aviv	Givatayim
	Kirschenberg 38' (pen.)	Report (p. 8)	24' Rabinovich; 50' Israeli; 69' (pen.) Merimovich; 73' R. Levi	Stadium: HaMakhtesh Stadium; Attendance: 3,500; Referee: Fritzner

==== Results by match ====
Round	1	2	3	4	5	6	7	8	9	10	11	12	13	14	15	16	17	18	19	20	21	22	23	24	25	26
Result	W	W	W	W	L	W	W	W	W	L	D	D	W	D	W	W	L	W	W	W	W	L	D	L	W	W
Position	5	2	2	2	3	2	2	2	2	2	2	2	2	2	2	2	2	2	1	1	1	1	1	1	2	2

Updated to match(es) played on 15 October 1955. Source: 2 Dear Points
W = Win; D = Draw; L = Loss

=== 1955–56 Liga Leumit ===
==== Final table ====
Pos	Club	P	W	D	L	GF	GA	GR	Pts	Notes
1	Maccabi Tel Aviv	22	13	6	3	47	16	2.94	32	Champions
2	Hapoel Petah Tikva	22	12	5	5	54	28	1.93	29	
3	Hapoel Tel Aviv	22	12	5	5	49	29	1.69	29	
4	Maccabi Petah Tikva	22	10	7	5	47	34	1.38	27	
5	Maccabi Haifa	22	11	3	8	51	29	1.76	25	

==== Matches ====
3 December 1955 1	Maccabi Petah Tikva	3–3	Maccabi Tel Aviv	Petah Tikva
	Bernard 2', 17'; I. Ben-Dror 28' (pen.)		5' Studinski; 25' Merimovich; 66' Israeli	Stadium: Maccabi Ground; Attendance: 4,000; Referee: Frizner

10 December 1955 2	Maccabi Tel Aviv	1–1	Hapoel Petah Tikva	Tel Aviv
	Merimovich 77'		36' Haldi	Stadium: Basa Stadium; Attendance: 5,000; Referee: Werner

17 December 1955 3	Maccabi Haifa	1–3	Maccabi Tel Aviv	Haifa
	Ben-Tzvi 53' (pen.)		7' Merimovich; 55' Israeli; 88' Studinski	Stadium: Kiryat Eliezer Stadium; Attendance: 5,000; Referee: Fritzner

24 December 1955 4	Maccabi Tel Aviv	1–0	Hapoel Ramat Gan	Tel Aviv
	Nahmias 88'			Stadium: Basa Stadium; Attendance: 5,000; Referee: Moshe Cohen

31 December 1955 5	Maccabi Tel Aviv	1–1	Maccabi Jaffa	Tel Aviv
	Reznik 73'		90' Aroyo	Stadium: Basa Stadium, Tel Aviv; Attendance: 4,000; Referee: Sher

7 January 1956 6	Maccabi Tel Aviv	2–3	Beitar Tel Aviv	Tel Aviv
	Studinski 75'; Nahmias 78'		31' Elmaliah; 70' Huli; 89' Bar-Zion	Stadium: Basa Stadium, Tel Aviv; Referee: Ben-Rubi

14 January 1956 7	Maccabi Netanya	2–1	Maccabi Tel Aviv	Netanya
	Hosias 73'; Statzki 78'		22' Studinski	Stadium: Sar-Tov Stadium; Referee: Hoze

21 January 1956 8	Maccabi Tel Aviv	0–0	Hapoel Kfar Saba	Tel Aviv
				Stadium: Basa Stadium; Attendance: 4,000; Referee: Fritzner

11 February 1956 9	Maccabi Rehovot	0–7	Maccabi Tel Aviv	Rehovot
		Report	26', 65', 76' Studinski; 47' Merimovich; 68' Schneor; 70' Israeli; 90' Nahmias	Stadium: Maccabi Ground; Attendance: 2,000; Referee: Hoze

18 February 1956 10	Maccabi Tel Aviv	2–0	Hapoel Haifa	Tel Aviv
	R. Levi 61', 74'			Stadium: Basa Stadium; Referee: Fritzner

25 February 1956 11	Maccabi Tel Aviv	3–0	Hapoel Tel Aviv	Tel Aviv
	Y. Fuchs 33', 37'; Glazer 77'			Stadium: Basa Stadium; Attendance: 5,000; Referee: Ben-Rubi

3 March 1956 12	Maccabi Tel Aviv	2–0	Maccabi Petah Tikva	Tel Aviv
	Y. Fuchs 33'; Schneor 64' (pen.)			Stadium: Basa Stadium, Tel Aviv; Referee: Werner

10 March 1956 13	Hapoel Petah Tikva	1–1	Maccabi Tel Aviv	Petah Tikva
	Kofman 44'		37' Nahmias	Stadium: Hapoel Ground; Attendance: 6,000; Referee: Ben-Rubi

17 March 1956 14	Maccabi Tel Aviv	1–1	Maccabi Haifa	Tel Aviv
	Y. Glazer 18'		13' S. Levi	Stadium: Basa Stadium; Attendance: 4,000; Referee: Moshe Cohen

24 March 1956 15	Hapoel Ramat Gan	1–0	Maccabi Tel Aviv	Givatayim
	Kirschenberg 54'			Stadium: HaMakhtesh Stadium; Referee: Ben-Rubi

31 March 1956 16	Maccabi Jaffa	0–2	Maccabi Tel Aviv	Tel Aviv
			32' Reznik; 54' Merimovich	Stadium: Maccabi Jaffa Ground

7 April 1956 17	Beitar Tel Aviv	1–2	Maccabi Tel Aviv	Tel Aviv
	Elmaliah 64'		15' Israeli; 59' Nahmias	Stadium: Maccabi Jaffa Ground; Referee: Moshe Cohen

14 April 1956 18	Maccabi Tel Aviv	3–0	Maccabi Netanya	Tel Aviv
	Schneor 5'; Glazer 14'; Merimovich 65'			Stadium: Basa Stadium; Attendance: 2,500; Referee: Klein

22 April 1956 19	Hapoel Kfar Saba	0–1	Maccabi Tel Aviv	Kfar Saba
			48' Reznik	Stadium: Hapoel Ground; Referee: Ben-Rubi

19 May 1956 20	Maccabi Tel Aviv	5–1	Maccabi Rehovot	Tel Aviv
	Glazer 4'; Nahmias 31'; Dobrin 67'; Israeli 70'; Kofman 76' (o.g.)		13' (pen.) Vider	Stadium: Basa Stadium; Attendance: 5,000; Referee: Rosenbaum

27 May 1956 21	Hapoel Haifa	0–3	Maccabi Tel Aviv	Haifa
			52' Schneor; 54' Israeli; 74' Glazer	Stadium: Kiryat Eliezer Stadium; Attendance: 6,000; Referee: Ben-Rubi

2 June 1956 22	Hapoel Tel Aviv	0–3	Maccabi Tel Aviv	Tel Aviv
			35', 84' R. Levi; 65' Nahmias	Stadium: Basa Stadium; Attendance: 15,000; Referee: Fritzner

==== Results by match ====
Round	1	2	3	4	5	6	7	8	9	10	11	12	13	14	15	16	17	18	19	20	21	22
Result	D	D	W	W	D	L	L	D	W	W	W	W	D	D	L	W	W	W	W	W	W	W
Position	5	6	6	5	4	5	7	6	6	4	3	1	2	2	3	3	3	3	2	1	1	1

Updated to match(es) played on 28 July 1956. Source: IFA
W = Win; D = Draw; L = Loss

=== State Cup ===
27 August 1955 QF	Maccabi Tel Aviv	6–0	Hapoel Hadera	Tel Aviv
	Studinski 4', 75'; Israeli 16'; Merimovich 20', 68'; Schneor 68'			Stadium: Basa Stadium, Tel Aviv

22 October 1955 SF	Maccabi Haifa	0–5	Maccabi Tel Aviv	Petah Tikva
		Report (p. 8)	36' Merimovich; 40', 55', 84' Studinski; 89' Glazer	Stadium: Hapoel Ground; Attendance: 2,500; Referee: Ben-Rubi

19 November 1955 F	Hapoel Petah Tikva	1–3	Maccabi Tel Aviv	Tel Aviv
	Kofman 84'	Report (p. 8)	8' Nahmias; 35' Glazer; 68' Studinski	Stadium: Basa Stadium; Attendance: 12,000; Referee: Fritzner

=== Shapira Cup ===
In October and November, while the promotion playoffs and the State Cup were being played, two cup competitions were organized by Liga Leumit Clubs, the second edition of the Shapira Cup, and the Netanya 25th Anniversary Cup. Maccabi Haifa, Hapoel Petah Tikva, Maccabi Tel Aviv and Hapoel Tel Aviv played for the Shapira Cup, named after former Hapoel Tel Aviv treasurer Yosef Shapira. The competition was designed to be played as a double round-robin tournament but the competition was delayed after the teams playing only two matches each, as the third round matches were postponed due to weather conditions and then due to the 1954–55 Israel State Cup final, which involved Maccabi Tel Aviv and Hapoel Petah Tikva. As league matches started on 3 December 1955, the competition was abandoned altogether.

==== Table ====
Pos	Team	Pld	W	D	L	GF	GA	GR	Pts
1	Maccabi Tel Aviv	2	2	0	0	7	4	1.750	4
2	Maccabi Haifa	2	1	0	1	7	7	1.000	2
3	Hapoel Petah Tikva	2	1	0	1	6	6	1.000	2
4	Hapoel Tel Aviv	2	0	0	2	3	6	0.500	0

Source: Hadshot HaSport, p. 1

27 August 1955 1	Maccabi Tel Aviv	2–1	Hapoel Tel Aviv	Tel Aviv
	Glazer 29', 75'		89' Weiss	Stadium: Basa Stadium; Attendance: 5,500; Referee: Rosenbaum

5 November 1955 2	Maccabi Tel Aviv	5–3	Maccabi Haifa	Tel Aviv
	Glazer 6', 15', 17', 19'; Merimovich 78'	Report (p. 8)	8', 89' Hardy; 10' Menchel	Stadium: Basa Stadium; Attendance: 5,500; Referee: Moshe Cohen
