= 1954–55 Maccabi Tel Aviv F.C. season =

Maccabi Tel Aviv
1954–55 season
- Manager: Jerry Beit haLevi
- Stadium: Basa Stadium, Tel Aviv
- Liga Alef: not completed
- State Cup: not completed
- Top goalscorer: League: Yehoshua Glazer (25); All: Yehoshua Glazer (30)

The 1954–55 Maccabi Tel Aviv season was the club's 49th season since its establishment, in 1906, and 7th since the establishment of the State of Israel.

During the season, the club competed in Liga Alef (top division) and the State Cup. In addition, the club played in the privately organized Shapira Cup, a four-club league competition and took tours to Italy and England (the later while being billed as Maccabi Israel).

== Review and events ==
- In August 1954, Maccabi Tel Aviv departed for a tour of Italy, intending to play Lazio, Torino, Roma and Napoli. However, the matches against Torino and Roma were cancelled, and the team returned home after playing just two matches in Italy, drawing 0–0 with Lazio and losing 1–7 to Napoli, and one more match, en route home, a 1–1 draw against RC Paris, which was Ernst Happel's first match for RC Paris.
- A Maccabi XI, composed of the best players affiliated with Maccabi clubs, most of them from Maccabi Tel Aviv, took a tour of England between 21 October and 7 November 1954. Maccabi lost all four matches during the tour, including a 0–10 defeat to Wolves and was criticized heavily for arranging the tour and the pick of its opponents.
- During December 1954 and January 1955, as no league matches were played due to a dispute between Hapoel, Maccabi and Beitar factions in the IFA, Hapoel Tel Aviv organized a league competition for the top Tel Aviv teams, Hapoel, Maccabi, Beitar and Maccabi Jaffa. The competition was played as a double round-robin tournament, with the top placed team winning the cup, named after former Hapoel Tel Aviv treasurer, Yosef Shapira. Maccabi Tel Aviv won four matches and lost two, finishing second.
- In early May 1955, Brazilian team Associação Atlética Portuguesa visited Israeli, playing three matches, the first of which against Maccabi Tel Aviv. The Brazilians beat Maccabi 3–0, and a joint Maccabi-Hapoel team 4–0.

== Match results ==
=== Legend ===
Win Draw Loss

=== Liga Alef ===
League matches began on 6 February 1955, and by the time the season, only 20 rounds of matches were completed, delaying the end of the league season to the next season.

==== League table (as of 2 July 1955) ====
Pos	Team	Pld	W	D	L	GF	GA	GR	Pts
1	Maccabi Tel Aviv	20	14	3	3	68	20	3.400	31
2	Hapoel Petah Tikva	20	13	4	3	38	15	2.533	30
3	Hapoel Tel Aviv	20	9	8	3	37	17	2.176	26
4	Beitar Tel Aviv	20	9	5	6	48	36	1.333	23
5	Maccabi Petah Tikva	20	8	6	6	27	24	1.125	22

Updated to match(es) played on 2 July 1955. Source: Hadshot HaSport, 3 July 1955 (in Hebrew)

==== Matches ====
5 February 1955 1	Maccabi Tel Aviv	6–1	Maccabi Netanya	Tel Aviv
	Studinski 15', 88'; Levi 31'; Halivner 46'; Glazer 50'; Israeli 67'	Report (p. 8)	44' Caspi	Stadium: Basa Stadium; Attendance: 2,500; Referee: Cohen

12 February 1955 2	Beitar Jerusalem	1–4	Maccabi Tel Aviv	Jerusalem
	Yehezkel 15'	Report (p. 8)	27' (pen.) Schneor; 36', 71' Glazer; 86' (o.g.) Mizrahi	Stadium: YMCA Stadium; Attendance: 8,000; Referee: Levichter

19 February 1955 3	Maccabi Tel Aviv	3–1	Beitar Tel Aviv	Tel Aviv
	Rabinovich 12'; Israeli 18'; Studinski 85'	Report (p. 8)	46' Huli	Stadium: Basa Stadium; Attendance: 8,000; Referee: Klein

26 February 1955 4	Maccabi Haifa	1–3	Maccabi Tel Aviv	Haifa
	Ben-Tzvi 73' (pen.)	Report	30', 70' Israeli; 90' Glazer	Stadium: Kiryat Haim Stadium; Attendance: 3,000; Referee: Cohen

5 March 1955 5	Hapoel Petah Tikva	2–1	Maccabi Tel Aviv	Petah Tikva
	Stelmach 3'; Kofman 42'	Report (p. 8)	12' Glazer	Stadium: Hapoel Ground; Attendance: 3,500; Referee: Levichter

12 March 1955 6	Maccabi Tel Aviv	1–0	Hapoel Hadera	Tel Aviv
	Barzilai 70' (o.g.)	Report (p. 8)		Stadium: Basa Stadium; Attendance: 3,000; Referee: Asa

19 March 1955 7	Maccabi Tel Aviv	12–0	Hapoel Balfouria	Tel Aviv
	Schneor 4', 19', 53', 71', 76', 80'; Glazer 12', 23'; Studinski 18'; Israeli 38', 39', 65'			Stadium: Basa Stadium

2 April 1955 8	Hapoel Haifa	1–2	Maccabi Tel Aviv	Haifa
	Shamir 10'		26' Turika; 70' Studinski	Stadium: Kiryat Haim Stadium; Referee: Dudkevich

9 April 1955 9	Maccabi Tel Aviv	2–1	Maccabi Rehovot	Tel Aviv
	Glazer 25'; Studinski 42'	Report (p. 8)	46' Steuermann	Stadium: Basa Stadium; Attendance: 2,500; Referee: Levinger

13 April 1955 10	Hapoel Tel Aviv	2–1	Maccabi Tel Aviv	Tel Aviv
	Yehudayoff 11'; Rosenbaum 78'	Report (p. 4)	26' Glazer	Stadium: Basa Stadium; Attendance: 7,000; Referee: Sher

16 April 1955 11	Maccabi Tel Aviv	2–2	Maccabi Petah Tikva	Tel Aviv
	Dobrin 28'; Reznik 82' (pen.)	Report (p. 8)	30' (pen.) Spiegel; 48' Bernard	Stadium: Basa Stadium; Attendance: 8,000; Referee: Werner

23 April 1955 12	Hapoel Kfar Saba	0–0	Maccabi Tel Aviv	Kfar Saba
		Report (p. 8)		Stadium: Hapoel Ground; Attendance: 3,000; Referee: Klein

30 April 1955 13	Maccabi Tel Aviv	6–0	Hapoel Ramat Gan	Tel Aviv
	Glazer 9', 24', 29', 38'; Israeli 33'; Dobrin 67'	Report (p. 8)		Stadium: Basa Stadium; Attendance: 4,000; Referee: Levichter

14 May 1955 14	Maccabi Netanya	2–2	Maccabi Tel Aviv	Netanya
	M. Cohen 10'; I. Caspi 75'	Report (p. 8)	3', 62' Glazer	Stadium: Sar-Tov Stadium; Attendance: 3,000; Referee: Levinger

21 May 1955 15	Maccabi Tel Aviv	6–0	Beitar Jerusalem	Tel Aviv
	Glazer 16', 81'; Studinski 58', 69'; Levi 73'; Stiemer 87' (o.g.)	Report (p. 8)		Stadium: Basa Stadium; Attendance: 5,000; Referee: Werner

4 June 1955 16	Beitar Tel Aviv	3–0 (w/o) (abandoned)	Maccabi Tel Aviv	Tel Aviv
		Report (p. 8)	5' Glazer; 36' (pen.) Turika	Stadium: Basa Stadium; Attendance: 4,500; Referee: Sher

11 June 1955 17	Maccabi Tel Aviv	1–2	Maccabi Haifa	Tel Aviv
	Glazer 77'	Report	51' Tenenmaum; 62' (pen.) Ben-Tzvi	Stadium: Basa Stadium; Attendance: 5,000; Referee: Fried

18 June 1955 18	Maccabi Tel Aviv	2–1	Hapoel Petah Tikva	Tel Aviv
	Israeli 33'; Glazer 43'	Report (p. 8)	17' Stelmach	Stadium: Basa Stadium; Attendance: 8,000; Referee: Frizner

26 June 1955 19	Hapoel Hadera	1–2	Maccabi Tel Aviv	Hadera
	Salomon 55'	Report (p. 8)	25', 90' Studinski	Stadium: Hapoel Ground; Attendance: 2,500; Referee: Rosenbaum

3 July 1955 20	Hapoel Balfouria	2–9	Maccabi Tel Aviv	Afula
	Levin 26'; Kochavi 54'	Report (p. 8)	14', 19', 50', 61', 70' (pen.), 75' Glazer; 35' Israeli; 40', 58' Studinski	Stadium: Hapoel Ground; Attendance: 1,000; Referee: Zahavi

==== Results by match ====
Match	1	2	3	4	5	6	7	8	9	10	11	12	13	14	15	16	17	18	19	20
Result	W	W	W	W	L	W	W	W	W	L	D	D	W	D	W	W	L	W	W	W
Position	5	2	2	2	3	2	2	2	2	2	2	2	2	2	2	2	2	2	1	1

Updated to match(es) played on 3 July 1955. Source: 2 Dear Points
W = Win; D = Draw; L = Loss

=== State Cup ===
26 March 1955 Round 3	Maccabi Tel Aviv	6–0	Hakoah Tel Aviv	Tel Aviv
	Schneor 6', 85'; Matania 11' (pen.); Rabinovich 31', 82'; Israeli 33'			Stadium: Basa Stadium

28 May 1955 Round 4	Maccabi Tel Aviv	6–0	Bnei Yehuda	Tel Aviv
	Glazer 9', 51'; Turika 53' (pen.); Israeli 66', 73', 83'			Stadium: Basa Stadium

=== Shapira Cup ===
==== League table ====
Pos	Team	Pld	W	D	L	GF	GA	GR	Pts
1	Hapoel Tel Aviv (W)	6	5	0	1	12	7	1.714	10
2	Maccabi Tel Aviv	6	4	0	2	16	8	2.000	8
3	Beitar Tel Aviv	6	2	0	4	7	8	0.875	4
4	Maccabi Jaffa	6	1	0	5	5	17	0.294	2

Source: Hadshot HaSport, p. 1
(W) Winners

==== Results ====
4 December 1954 1	Maccabi Tel Aviv	5–1	Maccabi Jaffa	Tel Aviv
	Levinson 26' (o.g.); Studinski 29', 85'; Glazer 54'; Israeli 83'		65' B. Cohen	Stadium: Basa Stadium; Attendance: 8,000; Referee: Ben Rubi

11 December 1954 2	Maccabi Tel Aviv	2–1	Beitar Tel Aviv	Tel Aviv
	Schneor 2'; Glazer 87'		67' Gleit	Stadium: Basa Stadium; Attendance: 6,500; Referee: Werner

18 December 1954 3	Hapoel Tel Aviv	2–1	Maccabi Tel Aviv	Tel Aviv
	Rosenbaum 15'; Fuchs 46'		90' Reznik	Stadium: Basa Stadium; Attendance: 8,000; Referee: Ben-Rubi

25 December 1954 4	Maccabi Jaffa	1–5	Maccabi Tel Aviv	Tel Aviv
	Miranda 29'		15', 87', 89' Studinski; 20' Nahmias; 62' Glazer	Stadium: Basa Stadium; Attendance: 5,000

8 January 1955 5	Beitar Tel Aviv	2–1 abandoned	Maccabi Tel Aviv	Tel Aviv
	Huli 40'; Bar-Zion 58'		38' Reznik	Stadium: Basa Stadium; Attendance: 4,000; Referee: Dudkevich

15 January 1955 6	Maccabi Tel Aviv	2–1	Hapoel Tel Aviv	Tel Aviv
	Reznik 10'; Schweitzer 15' (o.g.)		81' Rosenbaum	Stadium: Basa Stadium; Attendance: 7,000; Referee: Cohen
