= 1965 Israel Super Cup =

Hakoah Ramat Gan	Maccabi Tel Aviv
3	3
- on aggregate (title shared)

First Match
Hakoah Ramat Gan	Maccabi Tel Aviv
2	2
- Date: September 22, 1965
- Venue: Ramat Gan Stadium, Ramat Gan
- Referee: Avraham Dudai
- Attendance: 8,000

Second Match
Maccabi Tel Aviv	Hakoah Ramat Gan
1	1
- Date: April 30, 1966
- Venue: Maccabiah Stadium, Tel Aviv
- Attendance: 800

The 1965 Israel Super Cup was the third Israel Super Cup, an annual Israeli football match played between the winners of the previous season's Top Division and Israel State Cup. As the match was not set by the Israel Football Association, it was considered an unofficial cup. The cup for this edition was donated by Ramat Gan Municipality.

== The first match ==
The match finished 2–2 after 90 minutes, and was marred by a pitch invasion during the match half-time, with a considerable number of fans staying around the pitch during the second half, occasionally disrupting the match. In the match itself, Maccabi took the a 2–0 by the 48th minute and Hakoah equalized by scoring twice within the last 15 minutes of the match.

== The second match ==
A replay wasn't set immediately, and was delayed as league matches started. Eventually, a friendly match was arrange for 30 April 1966, since the league went on a break as the national team played a friendly match and the Under-19 national team competed in the 1966 AFC Youth Championship. Only 800 spectators attended the match, which ended in a 1–1 draw.

== Match details ==
22 September 1965

Hakoah Ramat Gan	2–2	Maccabi Tel Aviv
Karako 6'; Shikva 48'		Shaharbani 65'; Tzelniker 82'

Ramat Gan Stadium, Ramat Gan
Attendance: 8,000
Referee: Avraham Dudai

Hakoah Ramat Gan	Maccabi Tel Aviv

GK	(Israel) Michael Kadosh
DF	(Israel) Eli Marmur
DF	(Israel) Yaron Zahavi
MF	(Israel) Gideon Sherer
MF	(Israel) Aharon Kapitolnik
MF	(Israel) Danny Heftel
FW	(Israel) Yehuda Shaharbani
FW	(Israel) Gadi Tzelniker
FW	(Israel) Zvi Farkas
FW	(Israel) Shaul Albucher
FW	(Israel) Efraim Gabai
Substitutes:
MF	(Israel) G. Refael	Substituted on
FW	(Israel) Roni Shuruk	Substituted on
Manager:
(Israel) Itzhak Schneor

GK	(Israel) Haim Levin
DF	(Israel) Amos Zlotolov
DF	(Israel) Ya'akov Kastenboim
MF	(Israel) Nisim Bachar
MF	(Israel) Shaul Matania
MF	(Israel) Michael Gershovich
RW	(Israel) Rahamim Talbi
FW	(Israel) Uri Kedmi
FW	(Israel) Shalom Shikva
FW	(Israel) Moshe Asis
FW	(Israel) David Karako
Substitutes:
Manager:
(Israel) Eliezer Spiegel

MATCH OFFICIALS

- Assistant referees:
  - Shalev
  - Gerstner

Match rules

- 90 minutes.

== Replay ==
30 April 1966

Maccabi Tel Aviv	1–1	Hakoah Ramat Gan
Asis 35'		Faraj 72'

Maccabiah Stadium, Tel Aviv
Attendance: 800

Maccabi Tel Aviv	Hakoah Ramat Gan

GK	(Israel) Haim Levin	Substituted off
DF	(Israel) Amos Zlotolov
DF	(Israel) Ya'akov Kastenboim
MF	(Israel) Nisim Bachar
MF	(Israel) David Karako
MF	(Israel) Michael Gershovich
RW	(Israel) Rahamim Talbi
FW	(Israel) Uri Kedmi
FW	(Israel) Eli Perahia
FW	(Israel) Moshe Asis
FW	(Israel) Rafi Baranes
Substitutes:
GK	(Israel) Moshe Bleiberg	Substituted on
Manager:
(Israel) Eliezer Spiegel

GK	(Israel) Duek
DF	(Israel) Eli Marmur
DF	(Israel) Yaron Zahavi	Substituted off
MF	(Israel) Gideon Sherer
MF	(Israel) Aharon Kapitolnik
MF	(Israel) Roni Shuruk
FW	(Israel) Sami Shauli	Substituted off
FW	(Israel) Silbermintz	Substituted off
FW	(Israel) Zvi Farkas
FW	(Israel) Yehuda Shaharbani	Substituted off
FW	(Israel) Efraim Gabai
Substitutes:
DF	(Israel) Itzhak Sustiel	Substituted on
MF	(Israel) G. Refael	Substituted on
FW	(Israel) Zvi Farkas	Substituted on
FW	(Israel) Faraj	Substituted on
Manager:
(Israel) Itzhak Schneor

Match rules

- 90 minutes.
