= 1948–49 Maccabi Tel Aviv F.C. season =

Maccabi Tel Aviv
1948–49 season
- Manager: Jerry Beit haLevi
- Stadium: Maccabiah Stadium, Tel Aviv
- State Cup: Quarter-final

The 1948–49 season was Maccabi Tel Aviv's 43rd season since its establishment, in 1906, and first since the establishment of the State of Israel.

Due to the 1948 Arab–Israeli War, civil footballing activities didn't start until spring 1949, with cup matches beginning on 9 April 1949 and league matches on 28 May 1949. The club played its first match of the season on 8 January 1949, in a friendly against the Air Force XI.

== Israeli League ==
Date	Opponent	Venue	Result	Scorers	Position
4 June 1949	Maccabi Petah Tikva	H	6–2	Aharon Sidi (2), Yosef Merimovich (2), Eli Fuchs, Hazkelevich	3
11 June 1949	Hapoel Haifa	A	0–1		6
18 June 1949	Maccabi Rishon LeZion	A	3–0	Yehoshua Glazer, Aharon Sidi, Shmuel Israeli	6
25 June 1949	Hapoel Petah Tikva	A	2–3	Hazkelevich (2)	6
9 July 1949	Maccabi Rehovot	H	2–2	Hazkelevich, Yehoshua Glazer	7
16 July 1949	Hapoel Ramat Gan	A	3–2	Shmuel Israeli, Eli Fuchs	5

After 16 July 1949, the IFA announced the beginning of the summer break, and league matches resume in September 1949.

League Table (top half) as of 16 July 1949:

Pos	Club	Pld	W	D	L	GF	GA	Pts
1	Beitar Tel Aviv	6	5	0	1	26	3	10
2	Maccabi Petah Tikva	7	4	1	2	28	16	9
3	Hapoel Tel Aviv	4	4	0	0	10	1	8
4	Hapoel Haifa	6	3	2	1	10	11	8
5	Maccabi Tel Aviv	6	3	1	2	16	10	7
6	Hapoel Petah Tikva	7	3	1	3	10	19	7

Pld = Matches played; W = Matches won; D = Matches drawn; L = Matches lost; GF = Goals for; GA = Goals against; Pts = Points

== State Cup ==
Date	Round	Leg	Opponents	H / A	Result	Scorers
16 April 1949	Round 1	Leg 1	Maccabi Rehovot	A	1–2	Zvi Studinski
23 April 1949	Round 1	Leg 2	Maccabi Rehovot	H	2–0	Aharon Sidi (2)
8 May 1949	Round 1	P/O	Maccabi Rehovot	N	8–0	Eli Fuchs (3), Hazkelevich (2), Yehoshua Glazer, Yosef Merimovich, Aharon Sidi
16 April 1949	Quarter-finals	Leg 1	Beitar Tel Aviv	A	1–2	Eli Fuchs
16 April 1949	Quarter-finals	Leg 2	Beitar Tel Aviv	H	0–2	
