= 1968 Israel Super Cup =

Sport competition

| Maccabi Tel Aviv | Bnei Yehuda |
| 2 | 1 |
- Date: 27 June 1968
- Venue: Bloomfield Stadium, Tel Aviv
- Referee: Moshe Ashkenazi
- Attendance: 8,000

The 1968 Israel Super Cup was the fifth Israel Super Cup, an annual Israeli football match played between the winners of the previous season's Top Division and Israel State Cup. As the match was not set by the Israel Football Association, it was considered an unofficial cup, with a trophy donated by the Maccabi Association.

The match was played between Maccabi Tel Aviv, champions of the 1966–68 Liga Leumit and Bnei Yehuda, winners of the 1967–68 Israel State Cup. At the match, played at Bloomfield Stadium, Maccabi Tel Aviv won 2–1.

== Match details ==
27 June 1968
19:00

| Maccabi Tel Aviv | 2–1 | Bnei Yehuda |
|---|---|---|
| Shikva 78'; Asis 89' | | S. Cohen 79' (pen.) |

Bloomfield Stadium, Tel Aviv
Attendance: 9,000
Referee: Menachem Ashkenazi

| Maccabi Tel Aviv | Bnei Yehuda |

GK
DF
DF
MF
MF
MF
RW
FW
FW
FW
LW
Substitutes:
MF
Manager:
(Israel) Yosef Merimovich

(Israel) Haim Levin
(Israel) Amos Zlotolov
(Israel) Menachem Bello
(Israel) Nissim Bachar | Substituted off
(Israel) Zvi Rosen
(Israel) Michael Gershovich
(Israel) Rachamim Talbi
(Israel) Shalom Shikva
(Israel) Moshe Asis (c)
(Israel) Uri Kedmi
(Israel) Rafi Baranes
(Israel) Ezra Ozeri | Substituted on

GK
DF
DF
MF
MF
MF
RW
FW
FW
FW
FW
Substitutes:
DF
FW
Manager:
(Israel) Zaki Mizrahi

(Israel) Shmuel Melika
(Israel) Yehoram Armenian | Substituted off
(Israel) Yosef Mukhtar
(Israel) Ya'akov Sharabi
(Israel) Menachem Cohen
(Israel) Shaul Cohen
(Israel) Zaki Mizrahi
(Israel) Yosef Mehalel (c)
(Israel) Shmuel Nahmias
(Israel) Moshe Ozeri
(Israel) Tzadok Mag'er
Israel Potashnik | Substituted on
(Israel) Yair Aloni | Substituted on
