= 1947 Palestine Cup =

Tournament details
- Country: Mandatory Palestine

Final positions
- Champions: Maccabi Tel Aviv (6th title)
- Runners-up: Beitar Tel Aviv

The 1947 Palestine Cup (Hebrew: הגביע הארץ-ישראלי, HaGvia HaEretz-Israeli) was the fifteenth season of Israeli Football Association's nationwide football cup competition, and the last competed before the declaration of independence of Israel.

The competition reverted to its previous format, of each round decided with a single match. Maccabi Tel Aviv and Beitar Tel Aviv met at a tempestuous final, which was abandoned at the 88th minute, with Maccabi leading 3–2. After Beitar claimed scoring an equalising goal, which wasn't given, the crowd stormed the pitch and Beitar player Yom-Tov Menasherov took the cup and escaped the pitch with it undetected by the authorities.

== Results ==
=== First round ===
Home team	Score	Away team
Maccabi Nes Tziona	5–3	Maccabi Haifa
Hapoel Hadera	4–5	Maccabi Rishon LeZion
Maccabi Ramat Gan	1–6	Hapoel HaTzafon Tel Aviv
Maccabi Netanya	6–3	Beitar Netanya
Hapoel Jerusalem	w/o	Beitar Ramat Gan
Hapoel Rishon LeZion	4–3	Beitar Jerusalem
Maccabi Hadera	3–3 (a.e.t.)	Hakoah Tel Aviv
S.C. Atlit	w/o	Hapoel Netanya

==== Replay ====
Home team	Score	Away team
Hakoah Tel Aviv	4–2	Maccabi Hadera

=== Second round ===
Home team	Score	Away team
Beitar Tel Aviv	4–0	Hapoel Rishon LeZion
Maccabi Tel Aviv	5–0	S.C. Atlit
Hapoel HaTzafon Tel Aviv	2–1	Hakoah Tel Aviv
Maccabi Rishon LeZion	0–1 (a.e.t.)	Hapoel Petah Tikva
Maccabi Avshalom Petah Tikva	4–1	Hapoel Tel Aviv
Hapoel Haifa	2–3	Maccabi Rehovot
Hapoel Ramat Gan	4–2	Maccabi Netanya
Hapoel Jerusalem	1–3	Maccabi Nes Tziona

=== Quarter-finals ===
Home team	Score	Away team
Beitar Tel Aviv	6–1	Hapoel HaTzafon Tel Aviv
Maccabi Tel Aviv	5–0	Hapoel Ramat Gan
Maccabi Nes Tziona	2–4	Maccabi Avshalom Petah Tikva
Maccabi Rehovot	2–2 (a.e.t.)	Hapoel Petah Tikva

==== Replay ====
Home team	Score	Away team
Hapoel Petah Tikva	2–1	Maccabi Rehovot

=== Semi-finals ===
Home team	Score	Away team
Beitar Tel Aviv	2–0	Hapoel Petah Tikva
Maccabi Tel Aviv	3–2	Maccabi Avshalom Petah Tikva

=== Final ===
28 June 1947

Maccabi Tel Aviv	3–0 (f) Orig. 3–2 (abandoned '88)	Beitar Tel Aviv
Merimovich 23', 64'; Glazer 56'		Panz 57'; Elfasi 78'

Maccabiah Stadium, Tel Aviv
Attendance: 15,000-25,000
Referee: Yon
