= Israeli 25th Anniversary Cup =

1973 25th Anniversary Cup
Tournament details
- Country: Israel

Final positions
- Champions: Maccabi Petah Tikva
- Runner-up: Maccabi Haifa

Tournament statistics
- Matches played: 27
- Goals scored: 95 (3.52 per match)

The 25th Anniversary Cup (Hebrew: גביע הכ"ה למדינה) was a stand-alone cup competition organized to celebrate the 25th anniversary of the Israeli Declaration of Independence.

The competition was played at the end of the 1972–73 season, while the national football team was involved in the 1974 FIFA World Cup qualification. The cup was played as two competitions, for Liga Leumit and for Liga Alef.

The Liga Leumit Cup was won by Maccabi Petah Tikva, who had beaten Maccabi Haifa in the final on penalties. The Liga Alef Cup was won by Hapoel Yehud, having beaten Hapoel Ramat Gan 2–0 in the final.

== Liga Leumit Cup ==
=== Group A ===
	Pld	W	D	L	GF	GA	GD	Pts
Maccabi Petah Tikva	3	3	0	0	10	2	8	6
Hapoel Be'er Sheva	3	1	0	2	6	6	0	2
Hakoah Ramat Gan	3	1	0	2	3	6	-3	2
Maccabi Netanya	3	1	0	2	7	12	-5	2

12 May 1973
Maccabi Netanya	3–2	Hakoah Ramat Gan
Hapoel Be'er Sheva	1–2	Maccabi Petah Tikva
19 May 1973
Maccabi Petah Tikva	5–1	Maccabi Netanya
Hakoah Ramat Gan	1–0	Hapoel Be'er Sheva
26 May 1973
Hapoel Be'er Sheva	5–3	Maccabi Netanya
Maccabi Petah Tikva	3–0	Maccabi Haifa

=== Group B ===
	Pld	W	D	L	GF	GA	GD	Pts
Maccabi Haifa	3	2	1	0	4	2	2	5
Hapoel Tel Aviv	3	1	2	0	8	4	4	4
Hapoel Kfar Saba	3	1	1	1	2	4	4	3
Beitar Jerusalem	3	0	0	3	3	13	-10	0

12 May 1973
Hapoel Tel Aviv	6–2	Beitar Jerusalem
Hapoel Kfar Saba	0–1	Maccabi Haifa
19 May 1973
Maccabi Haifa	2–1	Beitar Jerusalem
Hapoel Tel Aviv	1–1	Hapoel Kfar Saba
26 May 1973
Hapoel Kfar Saba	5–0	Beitar Jerusalem
Maccabi Haifa	1–1	Hapoel Tel Aviv

=== Group C ===
	Pld	W	D	L	GF	GA	GD	Pts
Hapoel Haifa	3	2	1	0	6	4	2	5
Hapoel Jerusalem	3	2	0	1	10	2	8	4
Beitar Tel Aviv	3	1	1	1	3	3	0	3
Shimshon Tel Aviv	3	0	0	3	2	12	-10	0

12 May 1973
Hapoel Jerusalem	7–0	Shimshon Tel Aviv
Beitar Tel Aviv	1–1	Hapoel Haifa
19 May 1973
Hapoel Jerusalem	2–0	Beitar Tel Aviv
Hapoel Haifa	3–2	Shimshon Tel Aviv
26 May 1973
Beitar Tel Aviv	2–0	Shimshon Tel Aviv
Hapoel Haifa	2–1	Hapoel Jerusalem

=== Group D ===
	Pld	W	D	L	GF	GA	GD	Pts
Maccabi Jaffa	3	2	1	0	6	1	5	5
Hapoel Marmorek	3	2	1	0	5	2	3	5
Hapoel Petah Tikva	3	1	0	2	3	6	-3	2
Maccabi Tel Aviv	3	0	0	3	3	8	-5	0

12 May 1973
Hapoel Marmorek	3–1	Maccabi Tel Aviv
Beitar Tel Aviv	3–0	Hapoel Petah Tikva
19 May 1973
Maccabi Jaffa	3–1	Maccabi Tel Aviv
Hapoel Petah Tikva	1–2	Hapoel Marmorek
26 May 1973
Maccabi Tel Aviv	1–2	Hapoel Petah Tikva
Hapoel Marmorek	0–0	Maccabi Jaffa

=== Semi-finals ===
29 May 1973
17:00

Hapoel Haifa	0–3	Maccabi Petah Tikva
	Davar	M. Mizrahi 37'; I. Seltzer 67'; I. Mizrahi

Kiryat Eliezer Stadium
Attendance: 6000
Referee: Zohar

29 May 1973
19:00

Maccabi Haifa	3–2 (a.e.t.)	Maccabi Jaffa
Gruber 3'; Adler 10'; Shoshi 98' (pen.)	Davar	Aroeti 21'; Kinstlich 80'

Kiryat Eliezer Stadium
Attendance: 5000
Referee: Handwerg

=== Final ===
16 June 1973

Maccabi Petah Tikva	1–1 (a.e.t.)	Maccabi Haifa
Spokoiny 70'	Davar	Agami 79'
Penalties
Z. Seltzer (penalty scored); I. Mizrahi (penalty scored); Spokoini (penalty scored); Makmel (penalty scored)	4–2	(penalty missed) Adler; (penalty scored) Karando; (penalty scored) Efron; (penalty missed) Shoshi

Hapoel Petah Tikva ground
Attendance: 4000
Referee: Yosefson

== Liga Alef Cup ==
The Liga Alef cup contested by the top 8 clubs in each division of 1972–73 Liga Alef.

=== Group A ===
	Pld	W	D	L	GF	GA	GD	Pts
Hapoel Ramat Gan	3	3	0	0	7	2	5	6
Hapoel Hadera	3	1	0	2	5	6	-1	2
Hapoel Herzliya	3	1	0	2	3	5	-2	2
Maccabi Herzliya	3	1	0	2	3	5	-2	2

12 May 1973
Hapoel Hadera	3–1	Hapoel Herzliya
Hapoel Ramat Gan	2–1	Maccabi Herzliya
19 May 1973
Hapoel Hadera	1–3	Hapoel Ramat Gan
Hapoel Herzliya	2–0	Maccabi Herzliya
26 May 1973
Hapoel Ramat Gan	2–0	Hapoel Herzliya
Maccabi Herzliya	2–1	Hapoel Hadera

=== Group B ===
	Pld	W	D	L	GF	GA	GD	Pts
Hapoel Tiberias	3	2	1	0	9	4	5	5
Hapoel Acre	3	2	0	1	10	3	7	4
Hapoel Tirat HaCarmel	3	1	0	1	8	16	-8	2
Beitar Netanya	3	0	1	2	4	8	-4	1

12 May 1973
Hapoel Acre	1–0	Beitar Netanya
Hapoel Tiberias	5–2	Hapoel Tirat HaCarmel
19 May 1973
Hapoel Tirat HaCarmel	0–8	Hapoel Acre
Hapoel Tiberias	1–1	Beitar Netanya
26 May 1973
Hapoel Acre	1–3	Hapoel Tiberias
Hapoel Tirat HaCarmel	6–3	Beitar Netanya

=== Group C ===
	Pld	W	D	L	GF	GA	GD	Pts
Bnei Yehuda	3	2	1	0	10	6	4	5
Maccabi Sha'arayim	3	1	2	0	8	6	2	4
Hapoel Ashdod	3	1	1	1	3	4	-1	3
Hapoel Rishon LeZion	3	0	0	3	6	11	-5	0

12 May 1973
Hapoel Rishon LeZion	3–5	Bnei Yehuda
Maccabi Sha'arayim	1–1	Hapoel Ashdod
19 May 1973
Maccabi Sha'arayim	3–3	Bnei Yehuda
Hapoel Ashdod	2–1	Hapoel Rishon LeZion
26 May 1973
Hapoel Rishon LeZion	2–4	Maccabi Sha'arayim
Hapoel Ashdod	0–2	Bnei Yehuda

=== Group D ===
	Pld	W	D	L	GF	GA	GD	Pts
Hapoel Yehud	3	3	0	0	8	1	7	6
Hapoel Dimona	3	1	1	1	5	4	1	3
Beitar Ramla	3	1	1	1	2	4	-2	3
Hapoel Holon	3	0	0	3	1	7	-6	0

12 May 1973
Beitar Ramla	1–0	Hapoel Holon
Hapoel Yehud	3–0	Hapoel Dimona
19 May 1973
Hapoel Yehud	2–1	Hapoel Holon
Beitar Ramla	1–1	Hapoel Dimona
26 May 1973
Hapoel Yehud	1–2	Beitar Ramla
Hapoel Dimona	4–0	Hapoel Holon

=== Semi-finals ===
2 June 1973

Hapoel Yehud	6–3	Hapoel Tiberias
Alkelay 28'; Leon 45'; S. Sasson 65', 84'; Haviv 70'; Shari 78'	Davar	Levi 5'; Nizri 13', 20'

Maccabi Hadera ground
Attendance: 1500
Referee: Arie

2 June 1973

Hapoel Ramat Gan	2–0	Bnei Yehuda
Borba 53'; R. Levi 80'	Davar

HaMakhtesh Stadium
Attendance: 3000
Referee: Julius Yosefson

=== Final ===
9 June 1973

Hapoel Yehud	2–0	Hapoel Ramat Gan
Leon 67'; S. Sasson 87'	Davar

Hapoel Petah Tikva ground
Attendance: 3000
Referee: Mizrahi
