= Tibi Cohen =

Israeli footballer and manager

Tibi Cohen טיבי כהן
Personal information
- Full name: Tibi Cohen
- Position: Defender

Senior career*
Years	Team	Apps	(Gls)
1949–1960	Maccabi Haifa	118	(3)
1962–1963	Beitar Haifa		
- * Club domestic league appearances and goals

Tibi Cohen (Hebrew: טיבי כהן) was an Israeli footballer and football manager, who played for Maccabi Haifa and later for Beitar Haifa, where he served and manager-player.

== Career ==
Cohen joined Maccabi Haifa when he immigrated to Israel in 1949 and stayed there until retiring in 1958. The club's best achievements during this period were finishing third in the league in 1957–58 and reaching the cup semi-finals in 1955. In April 1958, Cohen was called up to national team's reserve squad, but didn't make it up to the national squad.

In 1962, Cohen was appointed as coach of Beitar Haifa. Cohen led the team to a 5th place finish in the North A Division of Liga Bet, which led to promotion play-offs for the final spot in Liga Alef. The club made it to the play-offs final, but lost to Hapoel Herzliya and stayed in Liga Bet. Cohen left the club at the end of the season and was replaced by Jonny Hardy, who took the club to Liga Alef at the following season.
