= Willie Morrison =

Scottish footballer

Personal information
- Full name: William Morrison
- Date of birth: 31 March 1934
- Place of birth: Edinburgh, Scotland
- Date of death: 2001 (aged 66–67)
- Height: 5 ft 8 in (1.73 m)
- Position: Wing half

Senior career*
| Years | Team | Apps | (Gls) |
| 1950–1951 | Merchiston Thistle | | |
| 1951–1958 | Sunderland | 19 | (0) |
| 1958–1960 | Southend United | 60 | (4) |
| 1960–196? | Bedford Town | | |
- * Club domestic league appearances and goals

William Morrison (31 March 1934 – 2001) was a Scottish professional footballer who played as a wing half for Sunderland.
