= David Karako =

Israeli footballer (1945–2025)

David Karako דוד קרקו
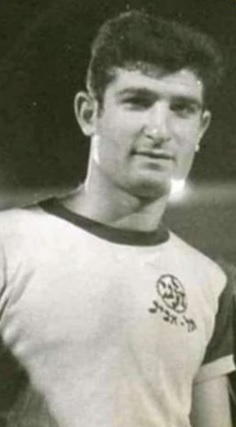
- Karako with Maccabi Tel-Aviv in the 1960s

Personal information
- Date of birth: 11 February 1945
- Place of birth: Jaffa, Tel Aviv District, Mandatory Palestine
- Date of death: 4 May 2025 (aged 80)
- Height: 1.75 m (5 ft 9 in)
- Position: Defender

Senior career*
Years	Team	Apps	(Gls)
1963–1975	Maccabi Tel-Aviv		
1975–1976	Beitar Jerusalem	33	(1)
1976–1982	Hapoel Yehud		

International career
1968–1972	Israel	12	(0)

Managerial career
- 1983–1984: Hapoel Yehud
- 1984–1985: Lazarus Holon
- 1985–1986: Hapoel Or Yehuda
- 1986–1987: Hapoel Yehud
- 1990–1991: Maccabi Herzliya
- 1992–1993: Hapoel Tayibe
- 1998: Ramat Gan
- * Club domestic league appearances and goals

David Karako (Hebrew: דוד קרקו; 11 February 1945 – 4 May 2025) was an Israeli footballer who played as a defender for the Israel national team between 1968 and 1972, gaining 12 caps. He was part of the Israel squad for the 1970 World Cup.

== Career ==
At club level, Karako played for Maccabi Tel Aviv, Beitar Jerusalem and Hapoel Yehud.

After retiring, Karako coached Hapoel Yehud, Lazarus Holon and Hapoel Or Yehuda before returning to Hapoel Yehud for a second stint. Later Karako coached Hapoel Tayibe, Maccabi Herzliya and Hapoel Ramat Gan.

== Death ==
Karako died on 4 May 2025, at the age of 80.
