= Zvi Studinski =

German-born Israeli footballer

Zvi Studinski צבי סטודינסקי
Personal information
- Full name: Zvi "Zvika" Studinski
- Date of birth: 16 February 1927
- Place of birth: Berlin, Germany
- Date of death: 20 February 2012 (aged 85)
- Place of death: Ra'anana, Israel
- Position: Striker

Youth career
- 1943–1945: Maccabi Tel Aviv

Senior career*
Years	Team	Apps	(Gls)
1945–1957	Maccabi Tel Aviv		

International career
1949–1954	Israel	5	(0)
- * Club domestic league appearances and goals

Zvi Studinski (Hebrew: צבי סטודינסקי; born 16 February 1927), was an Israeli footballer, who played for Maccabi Tel Aviv and for Israel.

== Career ==
Studinski was born in Berlin in 1927 and immigrated with his family to Eretz Israel after the rise of the Nazi Party. He joined Maccabi Tel Aviv's youth team in 1943 and moved to the senior team in 1945. With the senior team, Studinski won 5 league championships and 4 cups, including scoring goals in the 1954 and 1955 cup finals. Studinski retired from football in 1957.

Studinski played five FIFA-recognized matches for the Israel national football team, between 1949 and 1954, including taking part in Israel's first great victory, a 5–1 thrashing of Turkey, in which he played as midfielder and assisted one goal before being substituted in the second half, as well as playing in other 4 non FIFA recognized matches, scoring one goal in the 3–3 draw against a Cypriot XI on 23 July 1949.

== Honours ==
- League Championship (5):
  - 1946–47, 1949–50, 1951–52, 1953–54, 1955–56
- Israel State Cup (4):
  - 1946, 1947 Palestine Cup, 1954, 1955
