= Moshe Asis =

Israeli footballer

Moshe Asis משה עסיס
Personal information
- Date of birth: 9 October 1943 (age 83)
- Position: Midfielder

Senior career*
Years	Team	Apps	(Gls)
1961–1973	Maccabi Tel Aviv	230	(41)

International career
1966–1968	Israel		
- * Club domestic league appearances and goals

Moshe Asis (Hebrew: משה עסיס; born October 9, 1943) is a former Israeli football midfielder, who had most major appearances in Maccabi Tel Aviv, played from 1961 to 1973 and most successful player of the Maccabi Tel Aviv's history on the 1960s. Asis started his debut for international career at the Israel national football team and made in the team 14 appearances. Then his football career he retired and began working as restaurateur in Tel Aviv.
