= Itzhak Mizrahi =

Israeli microbiologist (born 1974)

Itzhak (Itzik) Mizrahi
- יצחק (איציק) מזרחי
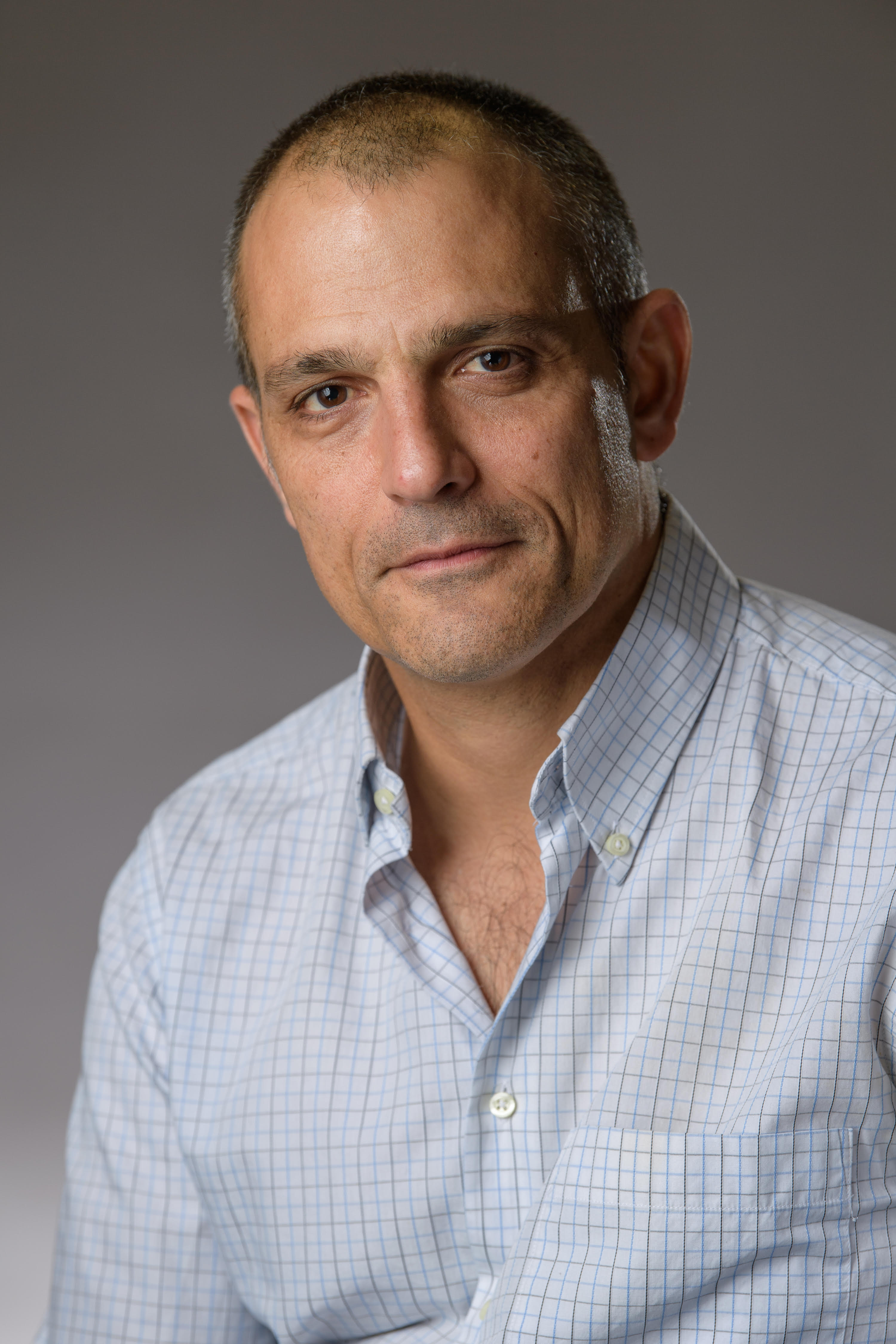
- Education: Tel Aviv University
- Known for: Contributions to microbial ecology; host–microbiome interactions; rumen microbiome research; linking ruminant microbiomes to feed efficiency and methane emissions; assembly of the rumen microbiome from birth to adulthood; environmental plasmidome; core microbiome concept; discovery and naming of novel human gut bacteria (Ruminococcus primaciens, R. hominiciens, R. ruminiciens)
- Awards: Michael Bruno Memorial Award (2024)Fellow of the American Academy of Microbiology, Fellow of the European Academy of Microbiology, Michael Bruno Memorial Award, naming of the bacterial species Prevotella mizrahii, European Research Council (ERC) Grantee.
- Scientific career
- Fields: Microbiology
- Workplaces: Ben-Gurion University of the Negev
- Doctoral advisor: Eliora Z. Ron

Itzhak (Itzik) Mizrahi (born 1974) is an Israeli microbiologist and a Full Professor at Ben-Gurion University of the Negev (BGU). His research focuses on microbial ecology and the evolution of the gut microbiome, particularly in ruminants. He is a recipient of the Michael Bruno Memorial Award and a fellow of both the American Society for Microbiology and European Academy of Microbiology.

== Life and career ==
Mizrahi completed his undergraduate and doctoral studies at Tel Aviv University as part of an excellence program. He then moved to the Technion - Israel Institute of Technology for his postdoctoral research, where he focused on stem cell research.

Following his postdoctoral training, Mizrahi was appointed as a research group leader at the Volcani Center (Agricultural Research Organization). In 2015, he joined the Department of Life Sciences at Ben-Gurion University of the Negev and the National Institute for Biotechnology in the Negev (NIBN). He currently serves as a faculty member at BGU's Goldman Sonnenfeldt School of Sustainability and Climate Change.

In 2020, the bacterial species Prevotella mizrahii was named in his honor, recognizing his contributions to the study of the rumen microbiome. He was elected as a fellow of the European Academy of Microbiology in 2022 and a fellow of the American Academy of Microbiology in 2023. In 2024, he was awarded the Michael Bruno Memorial Award for outstanding scientific achievement.

Mizrahi is a former elected member of the Israel Young Academy and is a vocal advocate for the "First Generation in Academia" initiative, supporting students who are the first in their families to pursue higher education.

== Research ==
Itzhak (Itzik) Mizrahi is known for his contributions to microbial ecology, particularly in host–microbiome systems and plasmid ecology, with a focus on the rumen microbiome. His research aims to identify general ecological and evolutionary mechanisms that span multiple host organisms, including humans, ruminants, fish, and marine iguanas, highlighting principles that are broadly applicable across gut ecosystems. His work has helped define key concepts such as the environmental plasmidome and the core microbiome, revealing conserved microbial communities across hosts and elucidating mechanisms underlying their persistence. He described the assembly of the rumen microbiome from birth to adulthood, demonstrating predictable developmental trajectories and their potential for manipulation. His research has uncovered fundamental interactions between hosts and their microbiomes, including links to host genetics, methane emissions and feed efficiency in ruminants, as well as host tolerance to environmental stressors such as temperature in fish. More broadly, his work focuses on understanding how microbial communities in digestive systems influence host health and environmental processes, with the long-term goal of shaping these communities to benefit health, food security, and environmental sustainability.

=== Rumen Microbiome and Climate Change ===
A central theme of Mizrahi's work is the study of the rumen microbiome in ruminants such as cattle and sheep. Mizrahi's team investigates how these microbes affect milk production and the emission of methane, a potent greenhouse gas.

Mizrahi identified natural microbial communities that result in both higher milk yields and significantly lower methane emissions - a finding described as a "win-win" for food security and environmental conservation.

A major pillar of Mizrahi's research is the definition and characterization of the core microbiome - the specific group of microbial taxa that are consistently present across different individual hosts, regardless of their location, breed, or diet. His work demonstrates the existence of a conserved “functional backbone” of microbes that sustain the host, along with the ecological and evolutionary mechanisms that enable their persistence.

=== Mechanisms of Fiber Degradation ===
Mizrahi’s foundational research explores the ecological and structural mechanisms of plant fiber deconstruction. In collaboration with colleagues, his work has uncovered how complex microbial consortia coordinate enzymatic activities to efficiently break down plant biomass, linking community structure to functional capacity, both at the community level and from a microbial point of view at the micro- and nanoscale.

Together with colleagues, Mizrahi identified and named three previously unknown species of human gut bacteria—Ruminococcus primaciens, R. hominiciens, and R. ruminiciens—specialized in the degradation of cellulose in the human gut The research suggests these bacteria likely transitioned from ruminants to humans during the early stages of domestication.
