= Shaul Matania =

Israeli footballer (1937–2017)

Shaul Matania שאול מתניה
Personal information
- Date of birth: 8 March 1937
- Place of birth: Tel Aviv, Mandatory Palestine
- Date of death: 20 July 2017 (aged 80)
- Place of death: Israel
- Height: 1.80 m (5 ft 11 in)
- Position: Defender

Youth career
- 1949–195?: Maccabi Tel Aviv

Senior career*
Years	Team	Apps	(Gls)
1953–1966	Maccabi Tel Aviv	253	(1)
1966–1968?	Maccabi Holon		
1968–19??	Maccabi Zikhron Ya'akov		
19??–1971	Hapoel Kfar Shalem		

International career
	Israel	17	(0)

Managerial career
- 1966–1968?: Maccabi Holon (player-coach)
- 1968–19??: Maccabi Zikhron Ya'akov (player-coach)
- 19??–1971: Hapoel Kfar Shalem (player-coach)
- 1971–197?: Hapoel Giv'at Shmuel
Medal record
Men's football
Representing Israel
AFC Asian Cup
Winner	1964 Israel
Runner-up	1956 Hong Kong
- * Club domestic league appearances and goals

Shaul Matania (Hebrew: שאול מתניה; 8 March 1937 – 20 July 2017) was an Israeli footballer who played in defender positions. He played for Maccabi Tel Aviv and the Israel national team. Matania won the title Israeli Footballer of the Year for the 1961–62 season.

== Club career ==
Matania started his football career in 1949, at the age of 12, when he joined the boys' team of Maccabi Tel Aviv. In 1953, when only 16, Matania joined the senior team. He was the defensive stronghold of the team for thirteen years.

Matania scored four times in cup games, of which two goals were penalties, and once in a league game. On 22 June 1957, Matania scored an equalizing goal in the 119th minute, virtually at end of the extension of the national cup semifinals, after Shlomo Nahari had shot Hapoel Petah Tikva to 2–1 in the 98th minute. Mantania's great stunt as a Tel Aviv defender in the Haifa Municipal Stadium was eventually to no avail, as Petah Tikva won 2–0 in the replay of the semifinals.

Until leaving Maccabi Tel Aviv's senior team in 1966, Matania won three national championships and six national cups. He had 253 caps in league games and 39 in cup games. A cool fact is that he never entered a game on the senior team as a replacement.

== International career ==
Matania earned 17 caps with the Israel national team. His debut was on 11 July 1956, in Moscow, in the pre-Olympic tournament against the Soviet Union national football team. In 1959 he played in the six qualifying games of the Asia Cup in India, among these a 3–0 victory over Iran and 3–1 victory over India. Israel ended first in the qualifying round, yet Matania missed out on the 1960 finals in South Korea, where Israel ended second.

The last game in which Matania played for the national team was in 1961 when the Yugoslavia national football team beat Israel 2–0 in Ramat Gan. As a bencher, he was on the national team for many more years to come.

== Managerial career ==
From 1966 to 1971, Matania was a player-coach at Maccabi Holon in Israel's second tier, Maccabi Zikhron Ya'akov (starting in 1968) in Israel's third tier, and Hapoel Kfar Shalem, also in Israel's third tier. In 1971, Matania quit his player career and became the manager of Hapoel Giv'at Shmuel.

== Personal and death ==
Next to and after his football career, Matania worked as a PE educator.

Matania died on 20 July 2017 at the age of 80. He was buried at kibbutz Einat.

== Honours ==
=== Player ===
Maccabi Tel Aviv

- Israeli championship: 1953–54, 1955–56, 1957–58
- Israel State Cup: 1953–54, 1954–55, 1957–58, 1958–59, 1963–64, 1964–65
- Super cup: 1955–56

Israel

- AFC Asian Cup: 1964; Runner-up, 1956

=== Individual ===
- Israeli Footballer of the Year: 1961-62
