= 1951–52 Liga Alef =

Liga Alef
- Season: 1951-52
- Champions: Maccabi Tel Aviv; 6th title
- Relegated: Hapoel Rishon LeZion; Maccabi Rishon LeZion
- Matches played: 126
- Goals scored: 466 (3.7 per match)
- Top goalscorer: Yehoshua Glazer (27)

The 1951–52 season was the first edition of Liga Alef, which had replaced the Israeli League as the top division of football in Israel following a year-long hiatus. It took place between October 1951 to June 1952 and was contested by 12 clubs, the same ones which had played in the top flight during the 1949–50 season minus Maccabi Nes Tziona.

Maccabi Tel Aviv won their second consecutive championship, whilst the two Rishon LeZion clubs, Hapoel and Maccabi were relegated. Maccabi Tel Aviv's Yehoshua Glazer was the top scorer with 27 goals.

At the time, the league was played with two points for a win and one for a draw.

== Final table ==
Pos	Team	Pld	W	D	L	GF	GA	GR	Pts	
1	Maccabi Tel Aviv	22	18	2	2	89	18	4.944	38	Champions
2	Maccabi Petah Tikva	22	12	6	4	65	23	2.826	30	
3	Hapoel Haifa	22	14	1	7	46	26	1.769	29	
4	Hapoel Petah Tikva	22	10	7	5	38	20	1.900	27	
5	Hapoel Tel Aviv	22	9	7	6	31	22	1.409	25	
6	Maccabi Rehovot	22	8	7	7	35	37	0.946	23	
7	Beitar Tel Aviv	22	7	7	8	39	41	0.951	21	
8	Hapoel Ramat Gan	22	7	3	12	37	46	0.804	17	
9	Maccabi Netanya	22	6	5	11	36	46	0.783	17	
10	Maccabi Haifa	22	6	5	11	33	53	0.623	17	
11	Hapoel Rishon LeZion	22	5	6	11	22	52	0.423	16	Relegation to Liga Bet
12	Maccabi Rishon LeZion	22	1	2	19	13	100	0.130	4	Relegation to Liga Bet

Source: 100 Years of Football 1906-2006, Elisha Shohat (Israel), 2006

== Results ==
Home \ Away	BTA	HHA	HPT	HRG	HRL	HTA	MHA	MNE	MPT	MRV	MRL	MTA
Beitar Tel Aviv	—	1–2	1–1	2–1	3–2	2–1	4–0	1–1	1–1	2–1	3–0	1–6
Hapoel Haifa	2–1	—	1–2	1–0	2–0	2–1	3–0	5–0	1–2	1–0	6–0	0–2
Hapoel Petah Tikva	1–1	2–1	—	5–1	9–1	2–1	3–0	2–0	0–0	2–0	1–0	1–3
Hapoel Ramat Gan	4–2	0–3	2–1	—	4–0	1–1	2–1	3–4	0–0	1–1	5–1	1–5
Hapoel Rishon LeZion	2–0	2–0	1–1	2–0	—	1–1	2–0	1–1	0–0	2–2	2–1	0–4
Hapoel Tel Aviv	0–0	0–3	0–0	1–0	1–0	—	4–1	2–0	2–2	1–0	3–0	2–0
Maccabi Haifa	4–1	1–7	1–1	1–4	3–0	3–1	—	1–1	2–1	6–1	2–2	1–4
Maccabi Netanya	1–1	0–2	0–0	2–1	5–0	1–4	2–4	—	0–4	2–5	3–0	3–0
Maccabi Petah Tikva	4–1	8–1	1–0	4–2	6–0	3–0	1–1	5–1	—	4–0	8–1	2–6
Maccabi Rehovot	2–2	0–0	2–1	3–2	3–3	0–0	1–0	2–1	2–1	—	3–1	2–2
Maccabi Rishon LeZion	1–8	0–3	0–3	0–3	2–1	0–4	1–1	0–8	0–8	1–4	—	1–9
Maccabi Tel Aviv	4–1	4–0	3–0	6–0	4–0	1–1	7–0	3–0	2–0	2–1	12–1	—

Source: 100 Years of Football 1906-2006, Elisha Shohat (Israel), 2006
Legend: Blue = home team win; Red = away team win.
