= Georgios Savva =

Cypriot footballer

Georgios Savva Γεώργιος Σάββα
Personal information
- Full name: Georgios Savva
- Date of birth: 22 October 1933
- Place of birth: Nicosia, Cyprus
- Date of death: 9 August 1992 (aged 58)
- Position: Striker

Youth career
- APOEL Nicosia

Senior career*
Years	Team	Apps	(Gls)
1949–1955	APOEL Nicosia		
1955–1956	Maccabi Haifa	38	(10)
1956–1961	APOEL Nicosia		
- * Club domestic league appearances and goals as of March 8, 2007

Georgios Savva (Greek: Γεώργιος Σάββα; 22 October 1933 – 9 August 1992) was a Cypriot football striker and was the first foreign footballer ever to play professionally in Israel. He was also the first ever Greek Cypriot that played in a football championship outside Cyprus. Georgios comes from a working class Greek background mixed with Jewish heritage from one of his grandfathers.

He played football during the 1950s and he was one of the best ever Cypriot footballers. Sometimes he could play even as a defender. He began playing football for APOEL youth team in 1949 and one year later he became a member of the senior squad. Scoring two goals for his team in the Cypriot Cup final in 1951 against EPA Larnaca, APOEL won the final 7-0 (a record in a Cypriot Cup final until today) and he won the first trophy in his career. In 1952, he helped his team to win the Cypriot Championship and then, as the first professional Cypriot player he played football in England with Bristol City for one year and he also played for the representative team of London.

== Arrival to Israel ==
For the season 1955-56 he played for a year for Maccabi Haifa. Before Georgios, the only foreign players that played in Israel were British soldiers that were stationed in Israel during the British Mandate. The Cypriot striker was the first player ever to be brought in from abroad to play professional football in Israel.

Three offers from Israeli clubs were on the table though Georgios ended up only playing for Maccabi Haifa. Acclimation was difficult but eventually he settled in the port city and scored some goals to go down in the annals of history in Israeli football.

== Back to Cyprus ==
In 1956, he was brought back to Cyprus and he was the most important player of APOEL. In 1959, he beat by himself the Greece national football team, playing with a representative team of both AC Omonia and APOEL. He died on 9 August 1992.
