= Yosef Merimovich =

Football player and manager (1924–2011)

Yosef Merimovich 'יוסף "יוס'לה" מרימוביץ
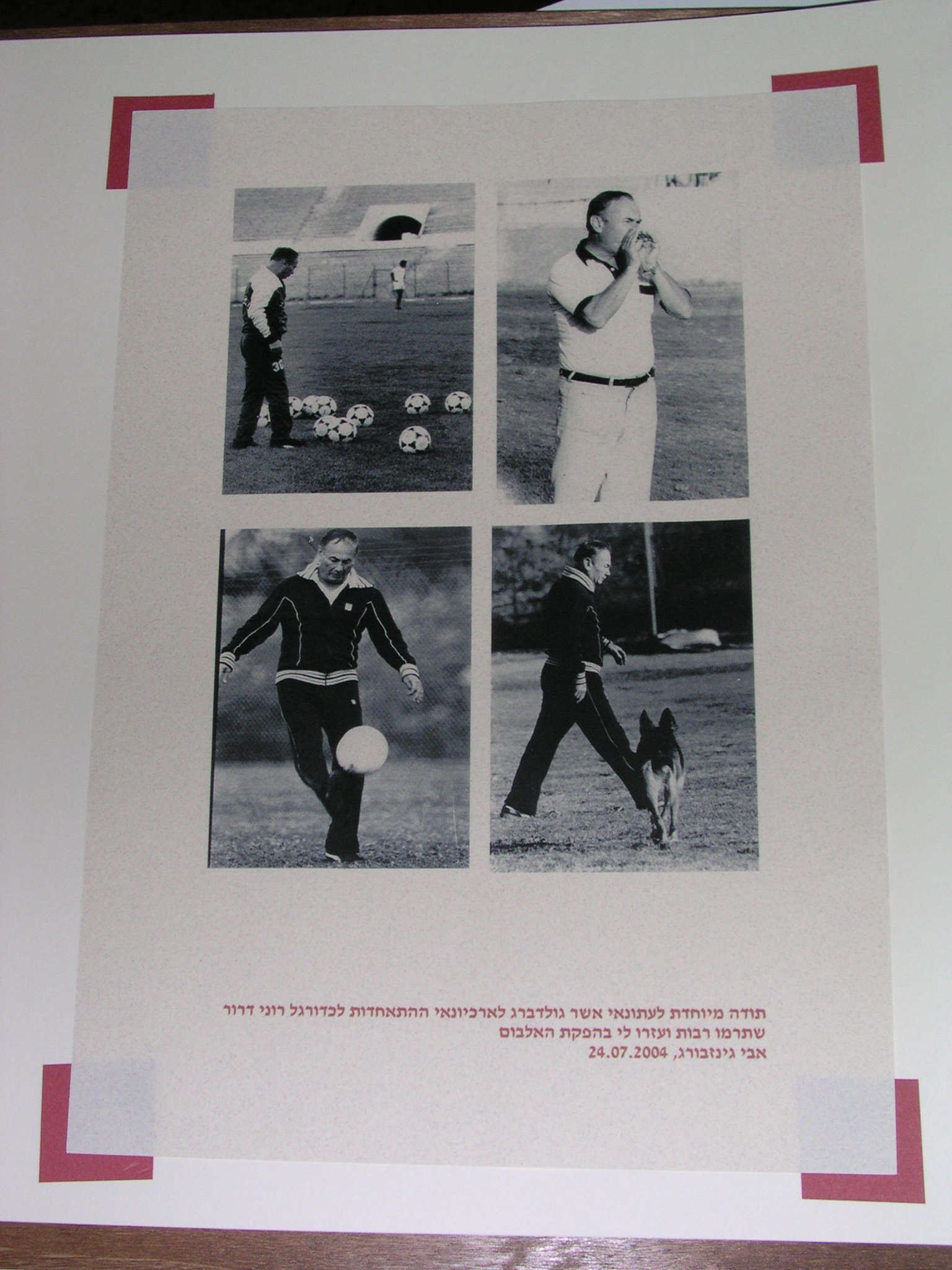

Personal information
- Date of birth: 24 July 1924
- Place of birth: Margo, Cyprus
- Date of death: 5 May 2011 (aged 86)
- Place of death: Israel
- Position: Forward

Youth career
- Maccabi Tel Aviv

Senior career*
Years	Team	Apps	(Gls)
1940–1958	Maccabi Tel Aviv	74	(67)

International career
1948–1956	Israel	14	(4)

Managerial career
- 1958–1960: Maccabi Tel Aviv
- 1964–1965: Israel
- 1966–1968: Hapoel Tel Aviv
- 1968–1969: Maccabi Tel Aviv
- 1977–1979: Hapoel Tel Aviv
- 1982–1986: Israel
- 1988–1989: Maccabi Tel Aviv
Medal record
Men's football
Representing Israel (as player)
AFC Asian Cup
Runner-up	1956 Hong Kong
Representing Israel (as manager)
AFC Asian Cup
Winner	1964
- * Club domestic league appearances and goals

Yosef "Yosale" Merimovich (Hebrew: יוסף "יוס'לה" מרימוביץ'; 24 July 1924 – 5 May 2011) was a football player and manager. A one-club man, he played as a forward for Maccabi Tel Aviv between 1947 and 1958, winning six championships and six cups. Born in Cyprus, he represented the Israel national team at international level. He went on to coach both Maccabi Tel Aviv and the Israel national team on multiple occasions.

== Career ==
Merimovich was born in Margo, a colony for Jewish refugees in Cyprus, and immigrated to Mandatory Palestine with his family in 1927. His older brother Menachem was also a football player. During World War II, Menachem, who had gone to Australia as part of his football career, served in the Australian Army and was killed in action in Papua New Guinea. Yosef worked as an engraver at the time.

Merimovich became a football player and spent his entire playing career with Maccabi Tel Aviv, winning six championships and six cups between 1947 and 1958. At international level, he made 14 appearances for the Israel national team scoring 4 goals.

After his retirement from playing, Merimovich became a coach of Maccabi Tel Aviv. He was appointed coach of Israel in 1964 and helped it win the 1964 AFC Asian Cup. He returned to Maccabi Tel Aviv winning the 1966–68 Liga Leumit. In 1982, he became Israel national team coach for a second time, leaving after the 1986 FIFA World Cup qualification campaign. He went on to coach Maccabi Tel Aviv for a third time.

== Legacy ==
It was upon Merimovich's suggestion in 1942 that yellow was added to Maccabi Tel Aviv's existing club colours of blue and white, "as a sign of identification with the Jews of Europe".

== Death ==
Merimovich died on 5 May 2011, at the age of 86.

== Honours ==
=== Player ===
Maccabi Tel Aviv

- Israeli football championship: 1946–47, 1949–50, 1951–52, 1953–54, 1955–56, 1957–58
- Israel State Cup : 1940–41, 1945–46, 1946–47, 1953–54, 1954–55, 1957–68

Israel

- AFC Asian Cup: Runner-up, 1956

=== Manager ===
Maccabi Tel Aviv

- Liga Leumit: 1966–68
- Israel State Cup: 1958–59
- Asian Champion Club Tournament: 1967, 1969

Israel

- AFC Asian Cup: 1964
