= Jonny Hardy =

Israeli footballer (1934–2017)

Jonny Hardy יונתן הרדי
Personal information
- Full name: Yonatan Hardy
- Date of birth: 2 June 1934 (age 92)
- Place of birth: Haifa, Mandate Palestine
- Date of death: 6 November 2017 (aged 83)
- Place of death: Haifa, Israel

Senior career*
Years	Team	Apps	(Gls)
1951–1963	Maccabi Haifa	193	(70)
1963–1966	Beitar Haifa		
1966–1968	Maccabi Zikhron Ya'akov		
- * Club domestic league appearances and goals

Yonatan "Jonny" Hardy (Hebrew: יונתן "ג'וני" הרדי; June 2, 1934 – November 6, 2017) was an Israeli footballer. He was best known for his years at Maccabi Haifa where he started his football career as well as his managerial career.

== Childhood ==
Though born in Haifa, Hardy grew up in Egypt since his father worked for the rail company, then under British control.
