= Thomas D'Alesandro Stadium =

Football stadium in Kiryat Haim, Israel

Coordinates: 32°49′28.50″N 35°03′38.70″E

- אצטדיון תומאס ד'אלסנדרו ג'וניור
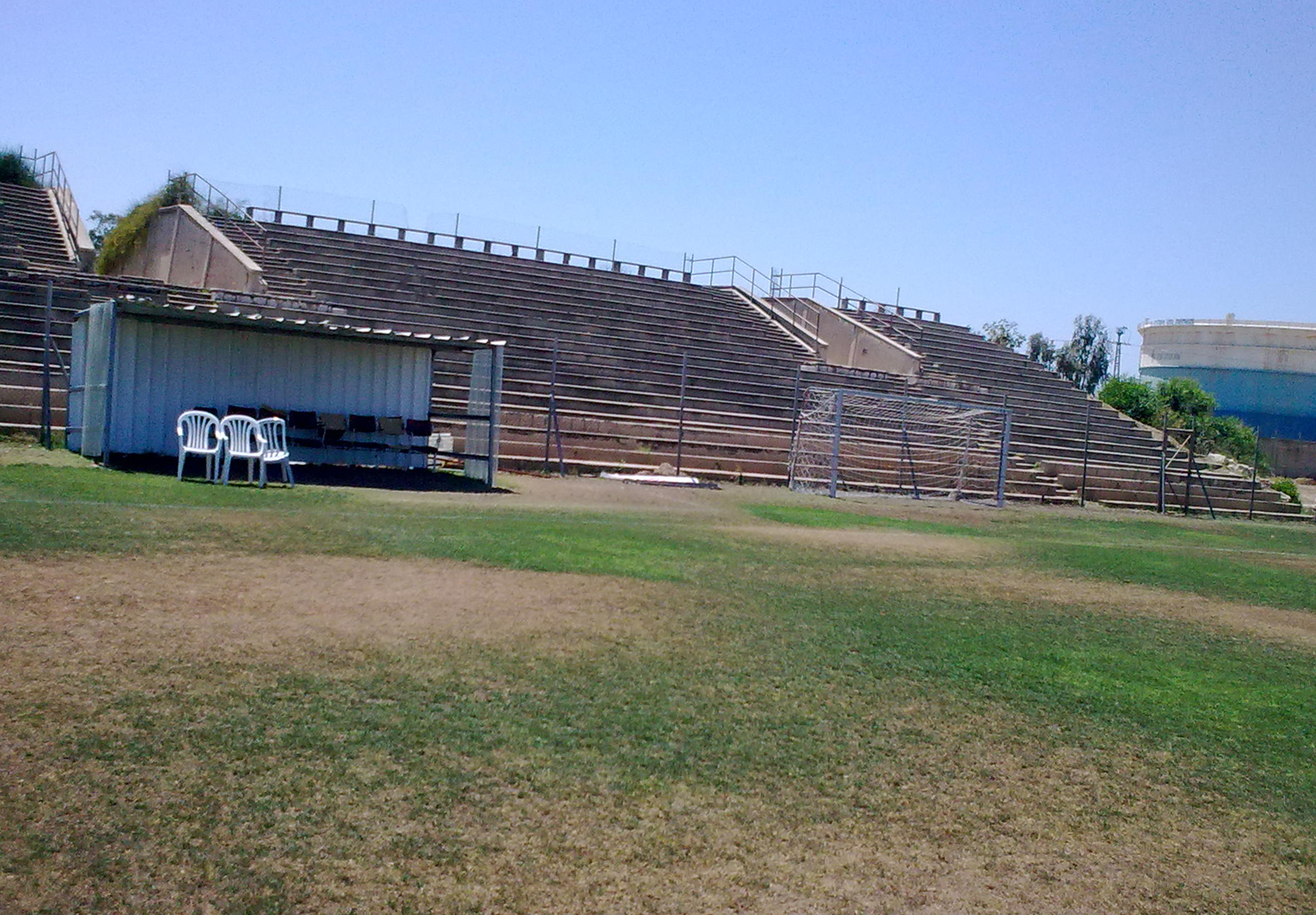
- Interactive map of Thomas D'Alesandro Stadium
- Location: Kiryat Haim, Israel
- Capacity: 1,000
- Surface: Grass

Tenants
- Hapoel Haifa (Ligat ha'Al) (1930–1955)

Thomas D'Alesandro Stadium, also known as Kiryat Haim Stadium, is a multi-purpose stadium in Kiryat Haim, Israel. It is used mostly for association football matches and is the home stadium of Hapoel Haifa's youth teams. It used to be home to the first teams of Hapoel as well as Maccabi Haifa, but was replaced by Kiryat Eliezer Stadium in 1955.

The stadium was built with help from the Jewish community of Baltimore, Maryland and named for the mayor of Baltimore, Thomas D'Alesandro Jr., who was the father of Nancy Pelosi; he "helped lead the movement in the United States to garner government support for the establishment of a Jewish state."
