= 1949–50 Israeli League =

Israeli League
- Season: 1949-50
- Champions: Maccabi Tel Aviv; 5th title
- Relegated: Maccabi Nes Tziona

The 1949–50 season was the first and only edition of the Israeli League. It was the first season after independence in 1948, and the eleventh season of league football in what had been Mandatory Palestine. The season started on 28 May 1949 and ended on 24 June 1950, with the league played on the basis of two points for a win and one for a draw.

Originally 14 teams were due to contest the league, the same line-up as the league for the abandoned 1947–48 season. However Hapoel HaTzafon Tel Aviv had disbanded and after failing to play their first three matches, the rest of the club's fixtures were cancelled and the league was contested by 13 clubs.

The title was won by Maccabi Tel Aviv. In early March 1950, Maccabi Nes Tziona were ejected from the league after failing to appear at three consecutive matches; all remaining matches in the season were forfeited. The club finished bottom of the league and were relegated.

After a season's hiatus, football resumed in 1951, by which time Liga Alef had become the country's top division.

== League table ==
Pos	Team	Pld	W	D	L	GF	GA	GR	Pts	
1	Maccabi Tel Aviv	24	21	1	2	103	18	5.722	43	Champions
2	Hapoel Tel Aviv	24	17	3	4	59	12	4.917	37	
3	Hapoel Haifa	24	16	4	4	53	30	1.767	36	
4	Hapoel Petah Tikva	24	15	4	5	63	31	2.032	33 (Note: The result of the match between Hapoel Petah Tikva and Beitar Tel Aviv (2–3) was annulled and no points were awarded.)	
5	Maccabi Petah Tikva	24	13	5	6	84	47	1.787	31	
6	Beitar Tel Aviv	24	12	3	9	57	41	1.390	26	
7	Maccabi Haifa	24	12	1	11	60	49	1.224	25	
8	Maccabi Rehovot	24	11	2	11	52	41	1.268	24	
9	Maccabi Netanya	24	7	3	14	43	73	0.589	17	
10	Hapoel Ramat Gan	24	8	0	16	47	62	0.758	16	
11	Hapoel Rishon LeZion	24	6	2	16	27	65	0.415	14	
12	Maccabi Rishon LeZion	24	3	2	19	20	111	0.180	8	
13	Maccabi Nes Tziona	24	0	0	24	7	95	0.074	0	Relegation to Liga Bet
14	Hapoel HaTzafon	3	0	0	3	–	–	—	0	Folded

Source: 100 Years of Football 1906-2006, Elisha Shohat (Israel), 2006

== Results ==
Home \ Away	BTA	HHA	HPT	HRG	HRL	HTA	MHA	MNZ	MNE	MPT	MRV	MRL	MTA
Beitar Tel Aviv	—	7–1	7–0	3–1	3–0	1–5	1–3	5–2	1–1	3–1	0–3	4–1	1–5
Hapoel Haifa	3–1	—	0–0	2–0	3–2	0–0	2–0	3–0	5–0	4–1	4–1	3–0	1–0
Hapoel Petah Tikva	0–0 (Note: The result of the match between Hapoel Petah Tikva and Beitar Tel Aviv (2–3) was annulled and no points were awarded.)	1–0	—	5–2	7–0	1–5	2–1	10–1	9–1	2–3	2–1	3–0	1–2
Hapoel Ramat Gan	3–0	1–2	1–2	—	2–3	0–3	2–1	5–1	4–1	1–3	1–6	10–1	2–3
Hapoel Rishon LeZion	0–1	3–3	0–2	2–1	—	0–3	3–6	1–0	1–0	1–3	0–1	2–1	0–3
Hapoel Tel Aviv	1–0	3–0	0–0	3–0	2–0	—	5–0	3–0	4–0	1–0	2–0	3–0	0–3
Maccabi Haifa	3–0	1–2	3–0	0–1	3–0	1–0	—	3–0	3–0	2–2	3–0	8–1	2–10
Maccabi Nes Tziona	0–6	0–3	0–3	0–3	0–5	0–4	0–3	—	1–7	0–3	0–3	1–3	0–3
Maccabi Netanya	1–2	1–3	0–4	4–0	3–0	0–3	3–2	3–0	—	5–4	2–2	5–0	0–3
Maccabi Petah Tikva	2–2	2–2	1–1	8–1	6–1	3–3	5–4	3–0	10–1	—	2–1	7–1	1–4
Maccabi Rehovot	0–1	2–4	1–2	1–4	5–1	2–0	3–1	3–0	3–2	0–6	—	9–0	0–1
Maccabi Rishon LeZion	0–8	0–3	0–3	3–1	2–2	0–6	1–7	3–0	2–2	1–6	0–3	—	0–3
Maccabi Tel Aviv	5–0	4–0	2–3	5–1	5–0	1–0	6–0	7–1	7–1	5–2	2–2	13–0	—

Source: 100 Years of Football 1906-2006, Elisha Shohat (Israel), 2006
Legend: Blue = home team win; Red = away team win.

== See also ==
- 1949-50 Liga Meuhedet
