= Itzhak Schneor =

Israeli footballer (1925–2011)

Itzhak Schneor יצחק שניאור
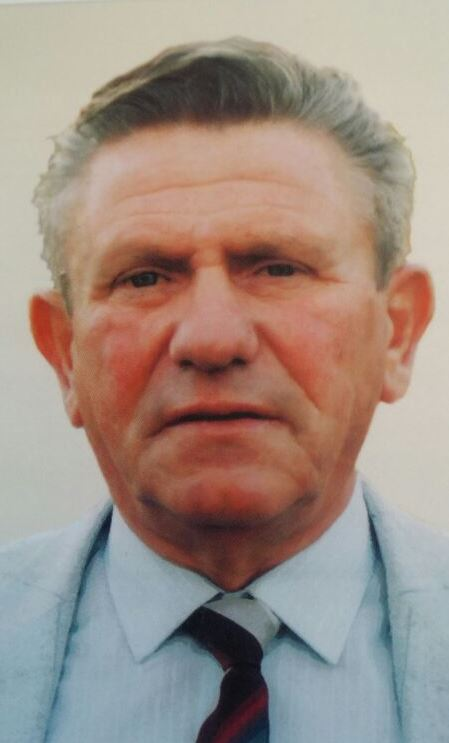

Personal information
- Date of birth: 11 December 1925
- Place of birth: Poland
- Date of death: 20 November 2011 (aged 85)
- Position: Defender

Senior career*
Years	Team	Apps	(Gls)
1942–1949	Beitar Tel Aviv		
1949–1956	Maccabi Tel Aviv		
1956–1958	Maccabi Jaffa		

International career
1949–1956	Israel	14	(0)

Managerial career
- Maccabi Jaffa
- Maccabi Sha'arayim
- Hapoel Hedera
- Bnei Yehuda
- Hapoel Petah Tikva
- Beitar Tel Aviv
- Beitar Jerusalem
- Hakoah Ramat Gan
- Shimshon Tel Aviv
- Maccabi Netanya
- Maccabi Tel Aviv
- Hapoel Tel Aviv
- 1988–1992: Israel
Medal record
Men's football
Representing Israel
AFC Asian Cup
Runner-up	1956 Hong Kong
- * Club domestic league appearances and goals

Itzhak Schneor (Hebrew: יצחק שניאור; 11 December 1925 – 20 November 2011) was an Israeli football player and manager. The peak of his managerial career was when he, alongside Ya'akov Grundman, jointly coached the Israel national team from 1988 to 1992, and were one goal short of qualifying for the 1990 FIFA World Cup.

== Honours ==
=== As player ===
Beitar Tel Aviv

- Israel State Cup: 1942

Maccabi Tel Aviv

- Israeli championship: 1949–50, 1951–52, 1953–54, 1955–56
- Israel State Cup: 1954, 1955

Israel

- AFC Asian Cup: Runner-up, 1956

=== As a manager ===
Maccabi Tel Aviv

- Israeli championship: 1971–72

Hakoah Ramat Gan

- Israeli championship: 1972–73

Hapoel Tel Aviv

- Israeli championship: 1985–86
