= Eli Fuchs =

Israeli footballer and manager

Eli Fuchs אלי פוקס
Personal information
- Full name: Eliyahu Fuchs
- Date of birth: 1924 1 January
- Date of death: 1992
- Height: 1.86 m (6 ft 1 in)
- Position: Midfielder

Senior career*
Years	Team	Apps	(Gls)
- Maccabi Tel Aviv
1954–1955	Maccabi Haifa	48	(9)

International career
	Israel	9	(0)

Managerial career
- 1954–1956: Maccabi Haifa
- Maccabi Netanya
- 1968–1969: Olympiakos Nicosia
- 1977: Maccabi Haifa
- Port Elizabeth
- AC Omonia
- * Club domestic league appearances and goals

Eli Fuchs (Hebrew: אלי פוקס; 1924–1992) was an Israeli international football player and manager of Maccabi Haifa. Aside from managing in Israel, he has managed clubs in South Africa and Cyprus. He died in 1992 as an Arkia employee.

== Biography ==
Fuchs was discovered by coach Egon Pollak and began playing for Maccabi Tel Aviv in 1941. His younger brother, Yona, also played for the team. As a player, Fuchs, who stood 1.86 meters tall, starred in the role of half back (midfielder), and was also the longtime captain of the team, winning five championships and four cups. Fuchs also made nine appearances for the Israel national football team between 1948 and 1954, some of them as team captain.

In 1954, he left Maccabi Tel Aviv following a dispute with the management and coach Jerry Beit haLevi, and began coaching, first as a player-coach at Maccabi Haifa, where he introduced an attacking and attractive style of play, with modern ideas for football tactics.

In 1959, an announcement was made about his appointment as coach of the Israel national team, but shortly before departure for a friendly match in Wrocław against Poland, the Israel Football Association decided instead to appoint the Hungarian-Jewish coach Gyula Mándi, while Fuchs refused to serve as his assistant.

After his time at Maccabi Haifa he coached several teams in Israel, including Hapoel Kiryat Haim, Maccabi Petah Tikva, Hapoel Tel Aviv, Hapoel Jerusalem, Beitar Tel Aviv, Hapoel Ashdod, Hapoel Acre, Maccabi Netanya, Hapoel Kiryat Shmona (advisor), Hapoel Be’er Sheva, Maccabi Sha’arayim, Bnei Yehuda Tel Aviv, Beitar Jerusalem, a second stint at Maccabi Haifa, and more.

Fuchs also coached in Wits University Apollon"Sabin will lecture at the Weizmann Institute". HaTzofe (in Hebrew). 29 March 1966. and Port Elizabeth in South Africa,Triwisch, Menachem (6 December 1967). "Greetings from the Israelis in South Africa". Ma’ariv (in Hebrew). as well as Olympiakos Nicosia and Omonia Nicosia in Cyprus, with relative success, winning a championship in South Africa and both a championship and runner-up in Cyprus. In 1960 his Omonia team lost the title by a single point following an appeal by Anorthosis Famagusta, which was awarded the championship instead. In addition, Fuchs reached a cup final in Cyprus with Olympiakos.

In the late 1980s, Fuchs also wrote sports columns for the newspaper Hadashot. In 1992, Fuchs died at the age of 68 of cardiac arrest, while working as a maintenance employee at Arkia airlines, where he worked after retiring from football. He was buried at Kiryat Shaul Cemetery.
