= Yehoshua Glazer =

Israeli footballer

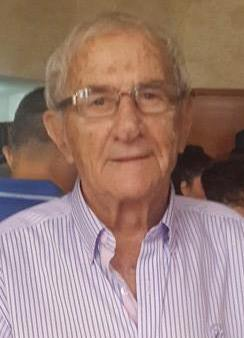
- Glazer in 2014

Personal information
- Full name: Yehoshua "Shiye" Glazer
- Date of birth: December 29, 1927
- Place of birth: Tel Aviv, Mandatory Palestine
- Date of death: December 29, 2018 (aged 91)
- Height: 5 ft 8 in (1.73 m)
- Position: Striker

Youth career
- 19??–1945: Maccabi Tel Aviv

Senior career*
| Years | Team | Apps | (Gls) |
| 1945–1963 | Maccabi Tel Aviv | 166 | (139) |
| 1963–1964 | Hapoel Kfar Saba | 26 | (17) |
| 1964–1965 | Beitar Netanya | 28 | (16) |
| 1965–1966 | Beitar Jerusalem | 23 | (9) |
| 1966–1967 | Sektzia Ness Ziona | | |

International career
| 1949–1961 | Israel | 35 | (18) |
Medal record
Men's football
Representing Israel
AFC Asian Cup
| Runner-up | 1956 Hong Kong |
| Runner-up | 1960 South Korea |
- * Club domestic league appearances and goals

Yehoshua Glazer (Hebrew: יהושע גלזר; 29 December 1927 – 29 December 2018) was an Israeli footballer who played for Maccabi Tel Aviv and for the Israel national football team his entire career.

== Honours ==
Maccabi Tel Aviv

- Israeli Premier League: 1946–47, 1949–50, 1951–52, 1953–54, 1955–56, 1957–58
- Israel State Cup:1946, 1947, 1954, 1955, 1958, 1959

Israel

- AFC Asian Cup: Runner-up, 1956, 1960
