= 1998–99 Liga Bet =

Israeli football season

The 1998–99 Liga Bet season saw Hapoel Hurfeish (champions of the North A division), Maccabi Hadera (champions of the North B division), Hapoel Kiryat Ono (champions of the South A division) and A.S. Ramat Eliyahu (champions of the South B division) win the title. The four clubs were placed in Liga Alef, which became the fourth tier upon the creation of the Israeli Premier League.

At the bottom, Hapoel Karmiel, Beitar Tiberias, Hapoel Bu'eine (from North A division), Hapoel Ilut, Maccabi Umm al-Fahm (from North B division), Maccabi Qalansawe, Hapoel Tel Mond, Maccabi Holon (from South A division) and Beitar Beit Shemesh (from South B division) were all placed in Liga Gimel, which became the sixth tier.

The rest of the clubs remained in Liga Bet, which became the fifth tier of the Israeli football league system.

== North A division ==
Pos	Team	Pld	W	D	L	GF	GA	GD	Pts	Qualification
1	Hapoel Hurfeish	30	22	8	0	60	19	+41	74	Placed in Liga Alef
2	Hapoel Bnei Nazareth	30	22	5	3	75	22	+53	71	Placed in Liga Bet
3	Hapoel Tuba	30	16	8	6	51	27	+24	56	Placed in Liga Bet
4	Maccabi Givat-Harakafot	30	14	6	10	48	43	+5	48	Placed in Liga Bet
5	Maccabi Sektzia Ma'alot-Tarshiha	30	13	8	9	58	41	+17	47	Placed in Liga Bet
6	Tzeirei Nahf	30	14	4	12	52	38	+14	43 (Note: 3 points deducted.)	Placed in Liga Bet
7	Hapoel Sakhnin	30	13	4	13	47	49	−2	43	Placed in Liga Bet
8	Hapoel Arraba	30	12	4	14	47	49	−2	40	Placed in Liga Bet
9	Hapoel Kafr Sumei	30	11	7	12	54	47	+7	40	Placed in Liga Bet
10	Ironi Nahariya	30	11	5	14	37	38	−1	38	Placed in Liga Bet
11	Hapoel Dir Hanna	30	11	4	15	37	44	−7	37	Placed in Liga Bet
12	Ironi I'billin	30	11	4	15	28	46	−18	37	Placed in Liga Bet
13	Hapoel Bnei Kafr Yasif	30	10	6	14	40	50	−10	36	Placed in Liga Bet
14	Hapoel Karmiel	30	8	10	12	35	44	−9	34	Placed in Liga Gimel
15	Beitar Tiberias	30	6	5	19	41	85	−44	23	Placed in Liga Gimel
16	Hapoel Bu'eine	30	2	0	28	7	75	−68	6	Placed in Liga Gimel

Source: rsssf.com

== North B division ==
Pos	Team	Pld	W	D	L	GF	GA	GD	Pts	Qualification
1	Maccabi Hadera	30	23	4	3	90	21	+69	73	Placed in Liga Alef
2	Hapoel Bir al-Maksur	30	22	4	4	78	30	+48	70	Placed in Liga Bet
3	Hapoel Nahliel	30	16	3	11	48	50	−2	51	Placed in Liga Bet
4	Hapoel Daliyat al-Karmel	30	14	6	10	59	45	+14	48	Placed in Liga Bet
5	Hapoel Arab Nujeidat	29	13	7	9	41	41	0	46	Placed in Liga Bet
6	Hapoel Mo'atza Ezorit Galil Tahton	30	13	4	13	45	40	+5	43	Placed in Liga Bet
7	Maccabi Ironi Tirat HaCarmel	30	13	4	13	41	45	−4	43	Placed in Liga Bet
8	Ironi Zikhron Ya'akov	30	10	9	11	53	60	−7	39	Placed in Liga Bet
9	Maccabi Beit She'an	30	10	8	12	51	58	−7	38	Placed in Liga Bet
10	Maccabi Ironi Baqa al-Gharbiyye	30	11	4	15	54	72	−18	37	Placed in Liga Bet
11	Hapoel Asi Gilboa	29	9	10	10	34	29	+5	37	Placed in Liga Bet
12	Hapoel Fureidis	30	9	10	11	33	44	−11	37	Placed in Liga Bet
13	Hapoel Reine	30	9	8	13	40	42	−2	35	Placed in Liga Bet
14	Hapoel Barta'a	29	8	5	16	29	46	−17	29	Placed in Liga Bet
15	Hapoel Ilut	30	8	3	19	32	56	−24	27	Placed in Liga Gimel
16	Maccabi Umm al-Fahm	29	3	5	21	24	73	−49	14	Placed in Liga Gimel

Source: rsssf.com
- Results of the matches between Hapoel Asi Gilboa and Hapoel Arab Nujeidat and between Hapoel Barta'a and Maccabi Umm al-Fahm are unknown.

== South A division ==
Pos	Team	Pld	W	D	L	GF	GA	GD	Pts	Qualification
1	Hapoel Kiryat Ono	30	20	6	4	58	25	+33	66	Placed in Liga Alef
2	Hapoel Herzliya	30	17	10	3	52	18	+34	61	Placed in Liga Bet
3	Beitar Kfar Saba	30	16	6	8	65	48	+17	54	Placed in Liga Bet
4	Maccabi Bat Yam	30	14	7	9	31	31	0	49	Placed in Liga Bet
5	M.M. Givat Shmuel	30	12	10	8	43	30	+13	46	Placed in Liga Bet
6	Beitar Nes Tubruk	30	13	5	12	41	37	+4	44	Placed in Liga Bet
7	Hapoel Azor	29	12	7	10	46	47	−1	43	Placed in Liga Bet
8	Beitar Ramat Gan	30	10	9	11	45	41	+4	39	Placed in Liga Bet
9	Hapoel Jaljulia	30	10	8	12	39	43	−4	38	Placed in Liga Bet
10	Hapoel Tira	30	10	8	12	30	39	−9	38	Placed in Liga Bet
11	Hapoel Mahane Yehuda	30	9	11	10	32	37	−5	38	Placed in Liga Bet
12	Hapoel Ironi Hod HaSharon	30	11	4	15	45	43	+2	37	Placed in Liga Bet
13	Maccabi Kafr Qasim	29	10	6	13	45	39	+6	36	Placed in Liga Bet
14	Maccabi Qalansawe	30	8	7	15	33	44	−11	31	Placed in Liga Gimel
15	Hapoel Tel Mond	30	8	6	16	32	46	−14	30	Placed in Liga Gimel
16	Maccabi Holon	30	1	6	23	24	93	−69	9	Placed in Liga Gimel

Source: rsssf.com
- Result of the match between Hapoel Azor and Maccabi Kafr Qasim is unknown.

== South B division ==
Pos	Team	Pld	W	D	L	GF	GA	GD	Pts	Qualification
1	A.S. Ramat Eliyahu	26	19	6	1	47	14	+33	63	Placed in Liga Alef
2	Maccabi Shikun HaMizrach	25	15	6	4	55	27	+28	51	Placed in Liga Bet
3	Hapoel Marmorek	26	13	9	4	57	27	+30	48	Placed in Liga Bet
4	Maccabi Ben Zvi	24	14	5	5	47	28	+19	47	Placed in Liga Bet
5	Maccabi Jerusalem/Ma'ale Adumim	25	14	4	7	60	33	+27	46	Placed in Liga Bet
6	Hapoel Ironi Eilat	26	10	1	15	63	60	+3	31	Placed in Liga Bet
7	Maccabi Neve-Alon Lod	25	10	1	14	45	57	−12	31	Placed in Liga Bet
8	Hapoel Bnei Lod	26	7	10	9	36	43	−7	31	Placed in Liga Bet
9	Ironi Ofakim	24	8	6	10	40	38	+2	30	Placed in Liga Bet
10	Hapoel Merhavim	26	8	5	13	43	48	−5	29	Placed in Liga Bet
11	Hapoel Masos/Segev Shalom	26	7	8	11	35	46	−11	29	Placed in Liga Bet
12	Maccabi Be'er Sheva	26	7	5	14	31	54	−23	26	Placed in Liga Bet
13	Hapoel Ironi Be'er Ya'akov	25	6	4	15	38	50	−12	22	Placed in Liga Bet
14	Beitar Beit Shemesh	22	2	2	18	19	91	−72	8	Placed in Liga Gimel

Source: rsssf.com
- Hapoel Yehud (at the start of the season) and Hapoel Kiryat Malakhi (during the season) withdrew from the league.
- Results of several matches are unknown
