= 2000–01 Liga Bet =

Israeli football season

The 2000–01 Liga Bet season saw Maccabi Ironi Shlomi, Hapoel Asi Gilboa, Hapoel Tira and Ironi Ofakim win their regional divisions and promoted to Liga Alef.

Second placed club, Beitar Kiryat Gat, were also promoted as the best runners-up in the South divisions, after a vacancy was created in Liga Alef South division.

At the bottom, Hapoel Bnei Kafr Yasif, Beitar Safed, Ironi I'billin (from North A division), Hapoel Arab Nujeidat, Beitar Iksal, Ironi Sayid Umm al-Fahm (from North B division), Maccabi Bnei Tira, Maccabi Kafr Qasim (from South A division) and Hapoel Rahat (from South B division) were all automatically relegated to Liga Gimel.

== North A Division ==
Pos	Team	Pld	W	D	L	GF	GA	GD	Pts	Promotion or relegation
1	Maccabi Ironi Shlomi	30	18	7	5	52	29	+23	61	Promoted to Liga Alef
2	Ironi Nahariya	30	19	3	8	62	29	+33	60	
3	Hapoel Tuba	30	18	7	5	39	23	+16	49 (Note: Twelve points deducted)	
4	Hapoel Deir Hanna	30	13	8	9	50	38	+12	47	
5	Hapoel Makr	30	14	7	9	50	39	+11	45 (Note: Four points deducted)	
6	Hapoel Arraba	30	14	5	11	44	36	+8	45 (Note: Two points deducted)	
7	Hapoel Bnei Manda	30	11	6	13	35	42	−7	37	
8	Hapoel Sakhnin	30	9	11	10	38	36	+2	36	
9	Hapoel Maghar	30	10	6	14	29	35	−6	36	Folded
10	Maccabi Sektzia Ma'alot	30	9	9	12	39	45	−6	36	
11	Hapoel Kaukab	29	8	10	11	44	40	+4	34	
12	Hapoel Bnei Kafr Yasif (Note: After the end of season, the IFA demoted Hapoel Bnei Kafr Yasif to Liga Gimel for fielding suspended players in five matches.)	30	8	10	12	34	41	−7	34	Relegated to Liga Gimel
13	Hapoel Bnei Nazareth	30	9	7	14	35	50	−15	34	
14	Hapoel Ramot Menashe Megiddo (Note: Maccabi Kiryat Shmona were originally set to play in the division. Following their merger with Hapoel Kiryat Shmona, which formed Hapoel Ironi Kiryat Shmona, the vacated spot was filled by promoting Hapoel Ramot Menashe Megiddo from Liga Gimel.)	30	9	6	15	45	59	−14	33	
15	Beitar Safed	30	7	9	14	24	46	−22	30	Relegated to Liga Gimel
16	Ironi I'billin	29	3	9	17	16	48	−32	16	Relegated to Liga Gimel

Source: rsssf.com

== North B Division ==
Pos	Team	Pld	W	D	L	GF	GA	GD	Pts	Promotion or relegation
1	Hapoel Asi Gilboa	29	17	8	4	61	31	+30	59	Promoted to Liga Alef
2	Hapoel Mo'atza Ezorit Galil Tahton	30	13	11	6	45	34	+11	50	
3	Hapoel Daliyat al-Karmel	30	13	9	8	51	39	+12	48	
4	Maccabi Tzur Shalom	30	13	8	9	52	36	+16	47	
5	Hapoel Tel Hanan (Note: Maccabi Afula which were relegated from Liga Alef in the previous season, were originally set to play in the division. As Maccabi Afula folded, the vacated spot was filled by Hapoel Tel Hanan, which were reprieved from relegation, after finished second bottom of the North A division in the previous season.)	30	14	4	12	54	48	+6	46	
6	Hapoel Reineh	30	12	9	9	41	35	+6	45	
7	Hapoel Bir al-Maksur	30	13	6	11	37	37	0	45	
8	Hapoel Umm al-Fahm	29	12	8	9	46	38	+8	44	
9	Maccabi Baqa al-Gharbiyye	30	11	7	12	46	44	+2	40	
10	Hapoel Baqa al-Gharbiyye	30	9	13	8	44	43	+1	40	
11	Hapoel Nahliel Givat Olga	30	11	6	13	34	35	−1	39	
12	Hapoel Fureidis	30	12	3	15	49	54	−5	39	
13	Hapoel Yafa	30	10	8	12	40	42	−2	38	
14	Hapoel Arab Nujeidat	29	7	10	12	34	44	−10	31	Relegated to Liga Gimel
15	Beitar Iksal	29	7	6	16	46	73	−27	27	Relegated to Liga Gimel
16	Ironi Sayid Umm al-Fahm	30	4	4	22	24	71	−47	16	Relegated to Liga Gimel

Source: rsssf.com

== South A Division ==
Promoted to Liga Alef:

- Hapoel Tira

Other league clubs:

- Hapoel Azor
- Beitar Ramat Gan
- Hapoel Mahane Yehuda
- Hapoel Hod HaSharon
- M.M. Giv'at Shmuel
- Hapoel Kafr Qasim
- Beitar Nes Tubruk
- Maccabi HaShikma Ramat Hen
- Shimshon Bnei Tayibe
- Maccabi Yehud
- Beitar Holon

Relegated to Liga Gimel:

- Maccabi Bnei Tira
- Maccabi Kafr Qasim

Hapoel Jaljulia and Hapoel Or Yehuda were originally set to play in the division. Hapoel Jaljulia which finished runners-up in the previous season, were promoted to Liga Alef in order to fill a vacated spot in that league. Hapoel Or Yehuda which were relegated from Liga Alef in the previous season, withdrew from the league.

== South B Division ==
Pos	Team	Pld	W	D	L	GF	GA	GD	Pts	Promotion or relegation
1	Ironi Ofakim	30	25	4	1	115	25	+90	79	Promoted to Liga Alef
2	Beitar Kiryat Gat (Note: Four vacated spots in the division were filled by promoting Hapoel Aliyah Kfar Saba, Maccabi Holon, Beitar Kiryat Gat and Moadon Tzeirei Rahat from Liga Gimel, after the four clubs finished in the previous season as runners-up in their regional divisions.)	30	24	1	5	75	23	+52	73	Promoted to Liga Alef
3	Hapoel Masos/Segev Shalom	30	22	5	3	66	21	+45	71	
4	Maccabi Holon	30	16	5	9	54	33	+21	53	
5	Maccabi Be'er Sheva	28	14	5	9	49	37	+12	47	
6	Hapoel Merhavim	30	12	5	13	47	39	+8	41	
7	Hapoel Sde Uzziah	30	11	6	13	42	54	−12	39	
8	Maccabi Kiryat Ekron	30	9	11	10	40	44	−4	38	
9	Hapoel Bnei Lakhish	29	9	10	10	36	41	−5	37	
10	Hapoel Yeruham	30	10	6	14	43	59	−16	36	
11	Maccabi Neve Alon Lod	30	9	8	13	42	64	−22	35	
12	Maccabi Ben Zvi	28	9	7	12	38	42	−4	34	
13	Hapoel Bnei Lod	30	9	4	17	42	69	−27	31	
14	Moadon Tzeirei Rahat	29	8	2	19	30	55	−25	26	
15	Hapoel Aliyah Kfar Saba	29	6	5	18	26	59	−33	23	
16	Hapoel Rahat	30	4	4	22	24	71	−47	16	Relegated to Liga Gimel

Source: rsssf.com
Notes:

Maccabi Jerusalem/Ma'ale Adumim and Sektzia Nes Tziona were originally set to play in the division. Maccabi Jerusalem/Ma'ale Adumim which finished runners-up in the previous season, were promoted to Liga Alef in order to fill a vacated spot in that league. Sektzia Nes Tziona which were due to be relegated from Liga Alef in the previous season, were eventually reprieved from relegation.
