= 2004–05 Liga Alef =

Israeli football league season

The 2004–05 Liga Alef season saw Maccabi Tzur Shalom (champions of the North Division) and Hapoel Bnei Lod (champions of the South Division) winning the title and promotion to 2005–06.

At the bottom, Hapoel Tuba, Maccabi Tur'an (from North division), Hapoel Qalansawe and Hapoel Jaljulia (from South division) were all automatically relegated to Liga Bet.

== North Division ==
Pos	Team	Pld	W	D	L	GF	GA	GD	Pts	Promotion or relegation
1	Maccabi Tzur Shalom	26	14	7	5	49	23	+26	49	Promoted to Liga Artzit
2	Hapoel Bnei Jadeidi	26	13	9	4	43	24	+19	48	
3	Ironi Shlomi	26	14	3	9	39	32	+7	45	
4	Hapoel Kafr Kanna	26	13	4	9	53	47	+6	43	
5	Hapoel Afula	26	9	10	7	51	50	+1	37	
6	Maccabi Tamra	26	11	4	11	33	36	−3	37	
7	Hapoel Asi Gilboa	26	11	3	12	44	35	+9	36	
8	Hapoel Kafr Sumei	26	9	5	12	33	36	−3	32	
9	Hapoel Reineh	26	8	7	11	42	39	+3	31	
10	Hapoel Makr	26	8	7	11	26	40	−14	31	
11	Hapoel Beit She'an	26	6	12	8	31	39	−8	30	
12	Maccabi Shefa-'Amr	26	7	8	11	24	31	−7	29	Relegation play-offs
13	Hapoel Tuba	26	7	6	13	28	45	−17	27	Relegated to Liga Bet
14	Maccabi Tur'an	26	5	9	12	32	51	−19	24	Relegated to Liga Bet

== South Division ==
Pos	Team	Pld	W	D	L	GF	GA	GD	Pts	Promotion or relegation
1	Hapoel Bnei Lod	26	19	5	2	51	18	+33	62	Promoted to Liga Artzit
2	Ironi Ofakim	26	15	11	0	43	14	+29	56	
3	Maccabi Sha'arayim	26	13	7	6	51	21	+30	46	
4	Hapoel Nahlat Yehuda	26	11	9	6	45	25	+20	42	
5	F.C. Kafr Qasim	26	9	7	10	37	46	−9	34	
6	Maccabi Yavne	26	9	6	11	37	42	−5	33	
7	Hapoel Kfar Shalem	26	7	12	7	24	31	−7	33	
8	A.S. Ramat Eliyahu	26	8	7	11	45	47	−2	31	
9	Hapoel Mevaseret Zion	26	8	7	11	32	47	−15	31	
10	Beitar Kiryat Gat	26	7	9	10	36	35	+1	30	
11	Maccabi Kiryat Gat	26	8	5	13	33	45	−12	29	
12	Beitar Giv'at Ze'ev	26	7	7	12	27	40	−13	28	Relegation play-offs
13	Hapoel Qalansawe	26	5	7	14	31	57	−26	22	Relegated to Liga Bet
14	Hapoel Jaljulia	26	4	5	17	26	50	−24	17	Relegated to Liga Bet

== Relegation play-offs ==
=== North play-off ===
The 12th placed club in Liga Alef North, Maccabi Shefa-'Amr, faced Liga Bet North A and North B runners-up, Hapoel Karmiel and Hapoel Umm al-Fahm. The teams played each other in a round-robin tournament, with all matches held at a neutral venue, Nahariya Municipal Stadium.

20 May 2005

Hapoel Umm al-Fahm	1 - 1	Hapoel Karmiel
	Report (in Hebrew)

24 May 2005

Hapoel Karmiel	0 - 3	Maccabi Shefa-'Amr
	Report (in Hebrew)

28 May 2005

Maccabi Shefa-'Amr	0 - 1	Hapoel Umm al-Fahm
	Report (in Hebrew)

Pos	Team	Pld	W	D	L	GF	GA	GD	Pts	Promotion or qualification
1	Hapoel Umm al-Fahm	2	1	1	0	2	1	+1	4	Promoted to Liga Alef
2	Maccabi Shefa-'Amr	2	1	0	1	3	1	+2	3	Remained in Liga Alef
3	Hapoel Karmiel	2	0	1	1	1	4	−3	1	Remained in Liga Bet

Hapoel Umm al-Fahm won the play-offs and was promoted to Liga Alef. Maccabi Shefa-'Amr remained in Liga Alef after Hapoel Majd al-Krum (which relegated from Liga Artzit to Liga Alef) folded during the summer.

=== South play-off ===
The 12th placed club in Liga Alef South, Beitar Giv'at Ze'ev, faced Liga Bet South A and Liga Bet South B runners-up, Hapoel Azor and Ironi Nes Tziona. The teams played each other in a round-robin tournament, with all matches held at a neutral venue, Bat Yam Municipal Stadium.

20 May 2005

Ironi Nes Tziona	3 - 1	Hapoel Azor
	Report (in Hebrew)

24 May 2005

Beitar Giv'at Ze'ev	1 - 1	Hapoel Azor
	Report (in Hebrew)

27 May 2005

Ironi Nes Tziona	1 - 0	Beitar Giv'at Ze'ev
	Report (in Hebrew)

Pos	Team	Pld	W	D	L	GF	GA	GD	Pts	Promotion or qualification
1	Ironi Nes Tziona	2	2	0	0	4	1	+3	6	Promoted to Liga Alef
2	Beitar Giv'at Ze'ev	2	0	1	1	1	2	−1	1	Remained in Liga Alef
3	Hapoel Azor	2	0	1	1	2	4	−2	1	Remained in Liga Bet

Ironi Nes Tziona won the play-offs and was promoted to Liga Alef. Beitar Giv'at Ze'ev remained in Liga Alef after a vacancy was created in the South division, following the merger of Liga Artzit club, Maccabi Ramat Amidar, with Hakoah Ramat Gan.
