= 2001–02 Liga Alef =

Israeli football season

The 2001–02 Liga Alef season saw Hapoel Kafr Sumei (champions of the North Division) and Maccabi Ramat Amidar (champions of the South Division) winning the title and promotion to Liga Artzit.

At the bottom, Tzeirei Nahf, Hapoel Hurfeish (from North division), Hapoel Kiryat Ono, Hapoel Lod and Maccabi Ma'ale Adumim (from South division) were all automatically relegated to Liga Bet.

== North Division ==
Pos	Team	Pld	W	D	L	GF	GA	GD	Pts	Promotion or relegation
1	Hapoel Kafr Sumei	26	17	4	5	55	26	+29	55	Promoted to Liga Artzit
2	Maccabi Shefa-'Amr	26	15	8	3	51	22	+29	53	
3	Hapoel Herzliya	26	12	10	4	53	20	+33	46	
4	Ironi Shlomi	26	12	6	8	49	30	+19	42	
5	Hapoel Hadera	26	11	9	6	30	20	+10	42	
6	Maccabi Tamra	26	11	6	9	36	26	+10	39	
7	Hapoel Migdal HaEmek	26	11	4	11	47	42	+5	37	
8	Maccabi Ironi Tirat HaCarmel	26	11	3	12	38	47	−9	36	
9	Hapoel Asi Gilboa	26	8	7	11	32	43	−11	31	
10	Maccabi Tur'an	26	8	7	11	33	52	−19	31	
11	Hapoel Kafr Kanna	26	8	5	13	39	52	−13	29	
12	Maccabi Hadera	26	7	7	12	30	37	−7	28	
13	Tzeirei Nahf	26	6	6	14	30	47	−17	24	Relegated to Liga Bet
14	Hapoel Hurfeish	26	2	4	20	21	80	−59	10	Relegated to Liga Bet

== South Division ==
Pos	Team	Pld	W	D	L	GF	GA	GD	Pts	Promotion or relegation
1	Maccabi Ramat Amidar	28	19	6	3	71	24	+47	63	Promoted to Liga Artzit
2	Maccabi Sha'arayim	28	19	6	3	53	21	+32	63	
3	Hapoel Nahlat Yehuda	28	18	7	3	60	21	+39	61	
4	Ironi Ofakim	28	14	8	6	54	30	+24	50	
5	Hapoel Jaljulia	28	12	7	9	42	39	+3	43	
6	Beitar Kiryat Gat	28	9	12	7	38	35	+3	39	
7	Hapoel Marmorek	28	7	12	9	33	34	−1	33	
8	Hapoel Mevaseret Zion	28	8	8	12	36	59	−23	32	
9	Hapoel Tira	28	8	7	13	39	59	−20	31	
10	Hapoel Kfar Shalem	28	8	6	14	33	39	−6	30	
11	Hapoel Dimona	28	8	5	15	37	61	−24	29	
12	A.S. Ramat Eliyahu	28	5	12	11	27	37	−10	27	
13	Hapoel Kiryat Ono	28	6	8	14	33	44	−11	26	Relegated to Liga Bet
14	Hapoel Lod	28	4	9	15	29	55	−26	21	Relegated to Liga Bet
15	Maccabi Jerusalem/Ma'ale Adumim	28	4	9	15	40	67	−27	21	Relegated to Liga Bet
