= 2002–03 Liga Alef =

Israeli football season

The 2002–03 Liga Alef season saw Hapoel Herzliya (champions of the North Division) and Hapoel Tira (champions of the South Division) winning the title and promotion to 2003–04. During the summer, Beitar Avraham Be'er Sheva folded, and Hapoel Marmorek was promoted to 2003–04 as well.

At the bottom, Hapoel Hadera, Hapoel Tayibe (from North division) were all automatically relegated to Liga Bet, whilst Beitar Kiryat Gat and A.S. Ramat Eliyahu (from South division) were reprieved from relegation, after Beitar Avraham Be'er Sheva and Hapoel Dimona folded.

== North Division ==
Pos	Team	Pld	W	D	L	GF	GA	GD	Pts	Promotion or relegation
1	Hapoel Herzliya	26	21	4	1	74	10	+64	67	Promoted to Liga Artzit
2	Hapoel Asi Gilboa	26	14	5	7	45	29	+16	47	
3	Maccabi Shefa-'Amr	26	10	8	8	40	33	+7	38	
4	Hapoel Tuba	26	9	9	8	32	32	0	36	
5	Hapoel Migdal HaEmek	26	9	8	9	28	36	−8	35	
6	Maccabi Ironi Tirat HaCarmel	26	8	9	9	40	38	+2	33	
7	Ironi Shlomi	26	8	9	9	35	34	+1	33	
8	Maccabi Tzur Shalom	26	8	9	9	35	44	−9	33	
9	Maccabi Tur'an	26	9	5	12	33	46	−13	32	
10	Maccabi Hadera	26	7	10	9	18	27	−9	31	
11	Hapoel Kafr Kanna	26	8	5	13	26	45	−19	29	
12	Maccabi Tamra	26	9	9	8	24	22	+2	28 (Note: 8 points deducted.)	
13	Hapoel Hadera	26	8	4	14	40	54	−14	28	Relegated to Liga Bet
14	Hapoel Tayibe	26	3	8	15	22	42	−20	17	Relegated to Liga Bet

== South Division ==
Pos	Team	Pld	W	D	L	GF	GA	GD	Pts	Promotion or relegation
1	Hapoel Tira	26	17	6	3	56	16	+40	57	Promoted to Liga Artzit
2	Hapoel Marmorek	26	15	3	8	63	37	+26	48	Promoted to Liga Artzit
3	Maccabi HaShikma Ramat Hen	26	13	6	7	58	37	+21	45	
4	Maccabi Be'er Sheva	26	11	7	8	52	32	+20	40	
5	Maccabi Sha'arayim	26	10	9	7	33	31	+2	39	
6	Maccabi Yavne	26	10	10	6	53	40	+13	38 (Note: 2 points deducted.)	
7	Hapoel Kfar Shalem	26	10	7	9	46	39	+7	37	
8	Hapoel Nahlat Yehuda	26	10	7	9	39	43	−4	37	
9	Ironi Ofakim	25	10	5	10	37	43	−6	35	
10	Hapoel Jaljulia	26	10	4	12	32	39	−7	34	
11	Hapoel Dimona	26	8	7	11	37	37	0	31	Folded
12	Hapoel Mevaseret Zion	26	8	4	14	36	51	−15	28	
13	Beitar Kiryat Gat	26	6	6	14	25	43	−18	24	
14	A.S. Ramat Eliyahu	25	1	3	21	11	90	−79	6	
