= 1996–97 Liga Gimel =

Israeli football season

The 1996–97 Liga Gimel season saw 155 clubs competing in 11 regional divisions for promotion to Liga Bet.

Beitar Tiberias, Hapoel Kabul, Ironi I'billin, Maccabi Beit She'an, Hapoel Daliyat al-Karmel, Hapoel Asi Gilboa, Beitar Nes Tubruk, Hapoel Jaljulia, Maccabi HaShikma Ramat Hen, Maccabi Jerusalem/Ma'ale Adumim and Maccabi Be'er Sheva won their regional divisions and promoted to Liga Bet.

== Upper Galilee Division ==
Pos	Team	Pld	W	D	L	GF	GA	GD	Pts	Promotion
1	Beitar Tiberias	22	19	3	0	94	21	+73	60	Promoted to Liga Bet
2	Beitar Maghar	22	14	5	3	55	27	+28	47	
3	Hapoel Yanuh	22	11	4	7	57	39	+18	37	
4	Maccabi Kiryat Shmona	22	11	3	8	45	45	0	36	
5	Hapoel Bnei Sajur	22	10	4	8	42	40	+2	34	
6	Beitar Safed	22	9	7	6	39	34	+5	34	
7	Maccabi Sajur	22	8	7	7	41	43	−2	31	
8	Hapoel Katzrin	22	8	3	11	37	34	+3	27	
9	Beitar Kafr Kanna	22	6	4	12	29	64	−35	22	
10	Hapoel Fassuta	22	6	4	12	26	37	−11	22	
11	Hapoel Rehaniya	22	2	6	14	25	59	−34	12	
12	Maccabi Bnei Yarka	22	2	2	18	16	63	−47	8	

== Western Galilee Division ==
Pos	Team	Pld	W	D	L	GF	GA	GD	Pts	Promotion
1	Hapoel Kabul	28	25	1	2	101	22	+79	76	Promoted to Liga Bet
2	Maccabi Ironi Shlomi	28	22	5	1	69	15	+54	71	
3	Ironi Nahariya	28	22	2	4	106	32	+74	68	
4	Maccabi Kafr Sumei	28	18	4	6	97	41	+56	58	
5	Hapoel Abu Snan	28	16	6	6	75	35	+40	51 (Note: Three points deducted)	
6	Hapoel Maghar	28	14	3	11	60	59	+1	45	
7	Hapoel Kisra	28	13	6	9	62	51	+11	45	
8	Hapoel Peki'in	28	11	7	10	53	46	+7	40	
9	Ironi Bnei Julis	28	12	2	14	73	47	+26	38	
10	Hapoel Nahariya	28	7	4	17	43	73	−30	25	
11	Hapoel Tarshiha	28	6	5	17	26	81	−55	23	
12	Maccabi Bi'ina	28	6	4	18	37	79	−42	22	
13	Beitar Ma'alot	28	5	5	18	36	78	−42	20	
14	Hapoel Jat HaGlilit	28	2	2	24	18	117	−99	8	
15	Hapoel Sha'ab	28	2	2	24	21	101	−80	8	

== Bay Division ==
Pos	Team	Pld	W	D	L	GF	GA	GD	Pts	Promotion
1	Ironi I'billin	28	24	4	0	70	10	+60	76	Promoted to Liga Bet
2	Hapoel Jadeidi	28	22	6	0	92	12	+80	72	
3	Hapoel Makr	28	22	4	2	81	13	+68	70	
4	Hapoel Mo'atza Ezorit Galil Tahton	28	20	6	2	82	16	+66	66	
5	Hapoel Bnei Acre	28	13	3	12	67	42	+25	42	
6	Hapoel Kaukab	28	13	2	13	57	56	+1	41	
7	Hapoel Bnei Manda	28	12	5	11	54	46	+8	41	
8	Hapoel Wadi Sallama	28	11	3	14	48	50	−2	36	
9	Beitar al-Ittihad Shefa-'Amr	28	10	4	14	63	65	−2	34	
10	Hapoel Halat al-Sharif Tamra	28	8	7	13	45	72	−27	31	
11	Maccabi Daliyat al-Karmel	28	9	3	16	59	59	0	30	
12	Hapoel Ka'abiyye	28	8	1	19	26	83	−57	25	
13	Hapoel Shefa-'Amr	28	4	5	19	21	67	−46	17	
14	Hapoel Bnei Mazra'a	28	5	0	23	25	124	−99	15	
15	Hapoel Kafr Sheikh Danun	28	2	1	25	17	92	−75	7	

== Jezreel Division ==
Pos	Team	Pld	W	D	L	GF	GA	GD	Pts	Promotion
1	Maccabi Beit She'an	30	23	6	1	94	18	+76	75	Promoted to Liga Bet
2	Hapoel Kafr Sulam	30	22	4	4	78	28	+50	70	
3	Hapoel Ilut	30	21	4	5	96	34	+62	67	
4	Hapoel Daburiyya	30	20	1	9	79	53	+26	61	
5	Hapoel Emek Tamra	30	17	5	8	67	35	+32	53 (Note: Three points deducted)	
6	Hapoel al-Ittihad Nazareth	30	16	4	10	61	37	+24	52	
7	Hapoel Kfar Kama	30	13	6	11	63	55	+8	45	
8	Hapoel Yafa	30	12	4	14	59	53	+6	40	
9	Maccabi Mashhad	30	11	7	12	61	48	+13	40	
10	Beitar Migdal HaEmek	30	10	5	15	66	67	−1	35	
11	Beitar Iksal	30	9	8	13	60	60	0	35	
12	Hapoel Kafr Misr	30	9	7	14	56	78	−22	31	
13	Maccabi Ein Mahil	30	7	5	18	36	77	−41	26	
14	Hapoel Mashhad	30	6	3	21	36	89	−53	21	
15	Hapoel Kafr Shibli	30	5	2	23	38	89	−51	17	
16	Beitar Afula	30	2	3	25	28	157	−129	9	

== Haifa Division ==
Pos	Team	Pld	W	D	L	GF	GA	GD	Pts	Promotion
1	Hapoel Daliyat al-Karmel	26	24	2	0	118	13	+105	74	Promoted to Liga Bet
2	Hapoel Tirat HaCarmel	26	23	3	0	91	16	+75	72	
3	Hapoel Yokneam	26	15	3	8	54	41	+13	48	
4	Maccabi Bir al-Maksur	26	14	4	8	57	40	+17	46	
5	Beitar Haifa	26	13	5	8	58	36	+22	44	
6	Beitar Atlit	26	14	1	11	47	44	+3	43	
7	Hapoel Bnei Kababir	26	11	5	10	45	36	+9	38	
8	Hapoel Tel Hanan	26	10	5	11	44	45	−1	35	
9	Maccabi Tzofei Haifa	26	8	7	11	58	54	+4	31	
10	Hapoel Bnei Kafr Yasif	26	6	4	16	24	83	−59	22	
11	Beitar Kiryat Yam	26	6	3	17	42	85	−43	21	
12	Maccabi Ka'abiyye	26	6	2	18	21	80	−59	20	
13	Maccabi Neve Sha'anan	26	4	2	20	23	68	−45	14	
14	Hapoel Basmat Tab'un	26	3	4	19	31	72	−41	13	

== Samaria Division ==
Pos	Team	Pld	W	D	L	GF	GA	GD	Pts	Promotion
1	Hapoel Asi Gilboa	28	22	4	2	105	26	+79	70	Promoted to Liga Bet
2	Hapoel Ramot Menashe Megiddo	28	22	2	4	87	38	+49	68	
3	Hapoel Ein as-Sahala	28	16	5	7	61	49	+12	53	
4	Hapoel Baqa al-Gharbiyye	28	15	4	9	73	48	+25	49	
5	Beitar Pardes Hanna	28	14	6	8	59	38	+21	48	
6	Maccabi Fureidis	28	13	7	8	63	44	+19	46	
7	Maccabi Kafr Qara	28	11	7	10	44	39	+5	40	
8	Hapoel Ar'ara	28	11	10	7	48	45	+3	39 (Note: Four points deducted.)	
9	Hapoel HaYogev Salem	28	8	9	11	38	45	−7	33	
10	Hapoel Muawiya	28	9	4	15	33	57	−24	31	
11	Ironi Zikhron Ya'akov	28	8	7	13	62	47	+15	31	
12	Beitar Umm al-Fahm	28	7	5	16	36	69	−33	26	
13	Hapoel Musheirifa	28	6	4	18	37	84	−47	22	
14	Maccabi Ar'ara	28	5	5	18	25	66	−41	20	
15	Maccabi Musmus	28	3	1	24	19	95	−76	6	

== Sharon Division ==
Pos	Team	Pld	W	D	L	GF	GA	GD	Pts	Promotion
1	Beitar Nes Tubruk	26	20	3	3	100	17	+83	63	Promoted to Liga Bet
2	Shimshon Bnei Tayibe	26	21	3	2	86	19	+67	62 (Note: Four points deducted.)	
3	Hapoel Tel Mond	26	18	3	5	85	25	+60	57	
4	Maccabi Bnei Tira	26	18	4	4	96	35	+61	55 (Note: Three points deducted.)	
5	Maccabi Kfar Yona	26	15	3	8	67	27	+40	48	
6	Maccabi Amidar Netanya	26	12	4	10	47	45	+2	40	
7	Shimshon Tira	26	10	7	9	41	52	−11	37	
8	Hapoel Pardesiya	26	10	6	10	49	41	+8	36	
9	Hapoel Jatt	26	10	4	12	59	64	−5	34	
10	Hapoel Qalansawe	26	8	3	15	47	55	−8	26 (Note: One point deducted.)	
11	Maccabi HaSharon Netanya	26	4	3	19	39	85	−46	15	
12	Hapoel Beit Eliezer	26	6	3	17	36	66	−30	14 (Note: Seven points deducted.)	
13	Hapoel Jisr az-Zarqa	26	4	3	19	32	85	−53	14 (Note: 1 point deducted?)	
14	Beitar Hadera	26	1	1	24	22	190	−168	4	

== Dan Division ==
Pos	Team	Pld	W	D	L	GF	GA	GD	Pts	Promotion
1	Hapoel Jaljulia	24	20	3	1	75	15	+60	63	Promoted to Liga Bet
2	Beitar Ariel	24	19	4	1	75	17	+58	61	
3	Flamingo Ironi Rosh HaAyin	24	17	3	4	89	17	+72	54	
4	Hapoel Neve Golan	24	15	5	4	72	38	+34	48 (Note: Two points deducted.)	
5	Hapoel Kafr Bara	24	12	4	8	56	44	+12	40	
6	Otzma Holon	24	9	6	9	45	30	+15	33	
7	Maccabi Rosh HaAyin	24	9	3	12	55	52	+3	30	
8	Maccabi Ramat HaSharon	24	9	3	12	41	51	−10	30	
9	Maccabi Yehud	24	7	4	13	20	41	−21	25	
10	Beitar Hod HaSharon	24	7	2	15	34	63	−29	23	
11	Brit Sport Ma'of	24	6	3	15	37	71	−34	21	
12	Hapoel Aliyah Kfar Saba	24	4	1	19	27	89	−62	10 (Note: Three points deducted.)	
13	Maccabi Ironi Jatt	24	1	1	22	13	111	−98	4	

== Tel Aviv Division ==
Pos	Team	Pld	W	D	L	GF	GA	GD	Pts	Promotion
1	Maccabi HaShikma Ramat Hen	28	24	0	4	93	26	+67	72	Promoted to Liga Bet
2	Hapoel Tirat Shalom	28	23	2	3	93	27	+66	71	
3	Beitar Ramat Gan	28	19	7	2	70	21	+49	64	
4	Beitar Beit Dagan	28	17	4	7	85	37	+48	55	
5	Maccabi Montefiore	28	17	4	7	107	44	+63	55	
6	Hapoel Ramat Yisrael	28	13	5	10	57	40	+17	44	
7	Beitar Kiryat Ono	28	13	2	13	61	47	+14	41	
8	Beitar Or Yehuda	28	12	5	11	88	85	+3	41	
9	Beitar Holon	28	12	1	15	86	64	+22	37	
10	Elitzur Bar Ilan	28	10	4	14	50	66	−16	34	
11	Hapoel Antonio Jaffa	28	10	3	15	50	61	−11	33	
12	Hapoel Kiryat Shalom	28	7	6	15	34	52	−18	27	
13	HaTzofim HaOrtodoxim	28	4	0	24	30	105	−75	12	
14	Hapoel Zeitan	28	3	3	22	40	120	−80	10 (Note: Two points deducted.)	
15	Beitar Ezra	28	2	2	24	41	190	−149	8	

== Central Division ==
Pos	Team	Pld	W	D	L	GF	GA	GD	Pts	Promotion
1	Maccabi Jerusalem/Ma'ale Adumim	24	21	2	1	89	15	+74	65	Promoted to Liga Bet
2	Maccabi Kiryat Ekron	24	17	3	4	44	29	+15	54	
3	Beitar Kiryat Gat	24	17	1	6	61	22	+39	52	
4	ASA Jerusalem	24	14	2	8	53	24	+29	44	
5	Beitar Kiryat Ekron	24	12	5	7	74	29	+45	39 (Note: Two points deducted.)	
6	Hapoel Ramla	24	10	6	8	49	39	+10	36	
7	Beitar Yavne	24	9	6	9	46	34	+12	33	
8	Hapoel Bnei Lod	24	7	10	7	34	34	0	31	
9	Maccabi Beit Shemesh	24	7	3	14	54	65	−11	24	
10	Hapoel Rakevet Lod	24	7	2	15	40	61	−21	23	
11	Maccabi Rehovot	24	8	2	14	38	67	−29	21 (Note: Five points deducted.)	
12	Maccabi Kiryat Malakhi	24	4	2	18	19	81	−62	14	
13	Hapoel Bnei Ayish	24	0	2	22	25	126	−101	2	

Notes:

Beitar Gedera were suspended from the league.

== South Division ==
Pos	Team	Pld	W	D	L	GF	GA	GD	Pts	Promotion
1	Maccabi Be'er Sheva	22	17	4	1	61	11	+50	55	Promoted to Liga Bet
2	Hapoel Arad	22	16	3	3	55	17	+38	51	
3	Hapoel Aroer	22	15	2	5	71	23	+48	47	
4	Hapoel Sde Uzziah/Be'er Tuvia	22	14	4	4	48	20	+28	46	
5	Hapoel Rahat	22	13	5	4	39	19	+20	44	
6	Maccabi Ironi Sderot	22	10	5	7	39	32	+7	35	
7	Hapoel Masos/Segev Shalom	22	7	4	11	34	43	−9	25	
8	Maccabi Yeruham	22	5	4	13	30	41	−11	19	
9	Hapoel Kuseife	19	4	4	11	22	39	−17	16	
10	Tzeirei Rahat	22	3	6	13	14	41	−27	15	
11	Hapoel Mitzpe Ramon	22	4	1	17	28	80	−52	11 (Note: Two points deducted.)	
12	Hapoel Gan Yavne	22	2	2	18	18	93	−75	8	
