= 1999–2000 Liga Gimel =

Israeli football season

The 1999–2000 Liga Bet season saw 153 clubs competing in 11 regional divisions for promotion to Liga Bet.

Beitar Safed, Hapoel Maghar, Hapoel Bnei Manda, Hapoel Yafa, Maccabi Tzur Shalom, Hapoel Baqa al-Gharbiyye, Shimshon Bnei Tayibe, Maccabi Yehud, Beitar Holon, Hapoel Sde Uzziah/Be'er Tuvia and Hapoel Rahat won their regional divisions and promoted to Liga Bet.

Second placed clubs, Hapoel Ramot Menashe Megiddo, Hapoel Aliyah Kfar Saba, Maccabi Holon, Beitar Kiryat Gat and Moadon Tzeirei Rahat were also promoted, after several vacancies were created in Liga Bet.

== Upper Galilee Division ==
Pos	Team	Pld	W	D	L	GF	GA	GD	Pts	Promotion
1	Beitar Safed	24	22	0	2	55	17	+38	66	Promoted to Liga Bet
2	Hapoel Peki'in	24	21	2	1	82	11	+71	65	
3	Hapoel Yanuh	24	20	2	2	77	15	+62	62	
4	Beitar Tiberias	24	13	5	6	50	34	+16	44	
5	Maccabi Beit Jann	24	11	5	8	55	39	+16	38	
6	Beitar Kafr Kanna	24	11	2	11	56	58	−2	35	
7	Maccabi Kabul	24	10	3	11	49	39	+10	29 (Note: Four points deducted.)	
8	Maccabi Bnei Yarka	24	7	6	11	39	51	−12	27	
9	Hapoel Katzrin	24	7	3	14	52	74	−22	24	
10	Hapoel Bnei Gush Halav	24	5	5	14	35	62	−27	20	
11	Hapoel Rehaniya	24	3	5	16	31	74	−43	14	
12	Hapoel Fassuta	24	2	4	18	22	58	−36	10	
13	Beitar Bi'ina	24	1	4	19	17	88	−71	7	

Source: rsssf.com

== Western Galilee Division ==
Pos	Team	Pld	W	D	L	GF	GA	GD	Pts	Promotion
1	Hapoel Maghar	26	23	3	0	111	12	+99	72	Promoted to Liga Bet
2	Hapoel Makr	26	23	2	1	105	23	+82	71	
3	Maccabi Kafr Sumei	26	21	1	4	70	34	+36	64	
4	Hapoel Kabul	26	17	3	6	95	39	+56	51 (Note: Three points deducted.)	
5	Hapoel Kisra	26	12	2	12	60	55	+5	38	
6	Maccabi Sha'ab	26	8	10	8	52	46	+6	33 (Note: No points or goals were awarded for Maccabi Sha'ab - Beitar Ma'alot.)	
7	Beitar Ma'alot	26	8	6	12	55	68	−13	29	
8	Hapoel Nahariya	26	8	4	14	47	67	−20	28	
9	Hapoel Tarshiha	26	7	7	12	33	60	−27	28	
10	Maccabi Bi'ina	26	7	2	17	44	79	−35	23	
11	Maccabi Yanuh	26	5	7	14	49	94	−45	22	
12	Hapoel Jat HaGlilit	26	5	4	17	27	66	−39	19	
13	Hapoel Bnei Mazra'a	26	3	8	15	38	89	−51	17	
14	Ironi Bnei Julis	26	5	1	20	43	97	−54	16	

Source: rsssf.com

== Bay Division ==
Pos	Team	Pld	W	D	L	GF	GA	GD	Pts	Promotion
1	Hapoel Bnei Manda	26	22	3	1	89	15	+74	69	Promoted to Liga Bet
2	Hapoel Bnei Tamra	26	20	4	2	75	22	+53	64	
3	Hapoel Karmiel	26	17	5	4	70	32	+38	56	
4	Maccabi Bir al-Maksur	26	14	5	7	53	38	+15	47	
5	Beitar al-Ittihad Shefa-'Amr	26	14	2	10	70	41	+29	44	
6	Hapoel Bnei Acre	26	12	2	12	50	42	+8	38	
7	Beitar Acre	26	10	6	10	50	56	−6	36	
8	Hapoel Kafr Sheikh Danun	26	9	7	10	31	38	−7	34	
9	Hapoel Halat al-Sharif Tamra	26	11	4	11	49	48	+1	33 (Note: Four points deducted.)	
10	Hapoel Shefa-'Amr	26	7	6	13	39	57	−18	27	
11	Hapoel Wadi Sallama	26	6	3	17	36	62	−26	21	
12	Bnei Kisra	26	4	7	15	35	69	−34	19	
13	Maccabi Kiryat Bialik	26	4	2	20	51	109	−58	14	
14	Hapoel Ka'abiyye	26	3	2	21	28	97	−69	11	

Source: rsssf.com

== Jezreel Division ==
Pos	Team	Pld	W	D	L	GF	GA	GD	Pts	Promotion
1	Hapoel Yafa	28	26	2	0	97	12	+85	80	Promoted to Liga Bet
2	Hapoel Ramot Menashe Megiddo	28	21	5	2	105	32	+73	68	Promoted to Liga Bet
3	Maccabi Ein Mahil	28	18	4	6	80	42	+38	58	
4	Maccabi Mashhad	28	18	3	7	59	39	+20	57	
5	Maccabi Ironi Yafa	28	16	2	10	70	36	+34	50	
6	Hapoel Emek Tamra	28	16	1	11	53	40	+13	49	
7	Hapoel Ein Mahil	28	12	5	11	45	37	+8	41	
8	Beitar Migdal HaEmek	28	11	3	14	63	66	−3	36	
9	Hapoel Yokneam	28	11	3	14	60	69	−9	36	
10	Hapoel Daburiyya	28	9	6	13	50	55	−5	33	
11	Hapoel Kfar Kama	28	6	4	18	37	74	−37	22	
12	Beitar Afula/Jezreel	28	6	4	18	40	97	−57	22	
13	Hapoel al-Ittihad Nazareth	28	4	5	19	42	79	−37	17	
14	Hapoel Sandala	28	4	4	20	28	86	−58	16	
15	Hapoel Ilut	28	3	7	18	31	96	−65	16	

Source: rsssf.com

== Haifa Division ==
Pos	Team	Pld	W	D	L	GF	GA	GD	Pts	Promotion
1	Maccabi Tzur Shalom	24	21	1	2	117	22	+95	64	Promoted to Liga Bet
2	Hapoel Ahva Haifa	24	21	0	3	98	23	+75	63	
3	Hapoel Basmat Tab'un	24	18	3	3	64	21	+43	55 (Note: Two points deducted)	
4	Beitar Haifa	24	17	2	5	87	41	+46	53	
5	Beitar Atlit	24	13	6	5	62	38	+24	45	
6	Maccabi Daliyat al-Karmel	24	12	3	9	51	45	+6	39	
7	Hapoel Bnei Kababir	24	7	5	12	50	49	+1	24	
8	Maccabi Tzofei Haifa	24	6	4	14	40	73	−33	22	
9	Hapoel Spartak Haifa	24	6	2	16	39	85	−46	20	
10	Maccabi Ka'abiyye	24	5	4	15	26	76	−50	19	
11	Bnei Abu Snan	24	5	3	16	37	68	−31	16	
12	Maccabi Neve Sha'anan	24	3	3	18	28	80	−52	12	
13	Beitar al-Amal Nazareth	24	2	4	18	27	95	−68	10	

Source: rsssf.com
Notes:

Beitar Kiryat Yam withdrew.

== Samaria Division ==
Pos	Team	Pld	W	D	L	GF	GA	GD	Pts	Promotion
1	Hapoel Baqa al-Gharbiyye	22	20	1	1	99	15	+84	61	Promoted to Liga Bet
2	Maccabi Ironi Kafr Qara	22	18	2	2	62	16	+46	54 (Note: Two points deducted.)	
3	Beitar Umm al-Fahm	22	12	2	8	33	30	+3	38	
4	Hapoel Kafr Sulam	22	10	5	7	41	32	+9	35	
5	Maccabi Umm al-Fahm	22	10	4	8	53	36	+17	34	
6	Hapoel Mashhad	22	10	3	9	29	44	−15	31	
7	Maccabi Fureidis	22	9	7	6	47	39	+8	31 (Note: Three points deducted.)	
8	Hapoel Muawiya	22	8	3	11	29	47	−18	27	
9	Beitar Ironi Pardes Hanna	22	5	3	14	24	43	−19	18	
10	Hapoel Kafr Misr	22	4	4	14	32	65	−33	16	
11	Maccabi Ar'ara	22	4	3	15	28	60	−32	15	
12	Hapoel Musheirifa	22	3	1	18	17	67	−50	10	

Source: rsssf.com
Notes:

Maccabi Musmus withdrew.

== Sharon Division ==
Pos	Team	Pld	W	D	L	GF	GA	GD	Pts	Promotion
1	Shimshon Bnei Tayibe	18	15	2	1	80	19	+61	47	Promoted to Liga Bet
2	Maccabi Or Akiva	18	13	3	2	46	15	+31	42	
3	Hapoel Pardesiya	18	10	5	3	38	18	+20	35	
4	Maccabi HaSharon Netanya	18	9	5	4	44	25	+19	32	
5	Hapoel Tel Mond	18	8	2	8	43	37	+6	26	
6	Hapoel Givat Olga	18	7	2	9	38	39	−1	23	
7	Ironi Kfar Yona	18	6	3	9	29	34	−5	21	
8	Hapoel Jatt	18	5	1	12	35	58	−23	16	
9	Hapoel Beit Eliezer	18	4	3	11	33	55	−22	15	
10	Beitar Hadera	18	0	0	18	13	99	−86	0	

Source: rsssf.com

Hapoel Jisr az-Zarqa, Maccabi Amidar Netanya and Maccabi Kfar Yona withdrew.

== Dan Division ==
Pos	Team	Pld	W	D	L	GF	GA	GD	Pts	Promotion
1	Maccabi Yehud	24	20	4	0	77	15	+62	64	Promoted to Liga Bet
2	Hapoel Aliyah Kfar Saba	24	15	4	5	68	24	+44	49	Promoted to Liga Bet
3	Shimshon Tira	24	15	4	5	55	28	+27	49	
4	Maccabi Qalansawe	24	16	1	7	64	33	+31	47 (Note: Two points deducted.)	
5	Hapoel Qalansawe	24	16	2	6	69	33	+36	46 (Note: Four points deducted.)	
6	Maccabi Rosh HaAyin	24	11	6	7	37	22	+15	39	
7	Hapoel Ironi Oranit	24	10	4	10	37	45	−8	34	
8	Beitar Ariel	24	8	4	12	60	55	+5	28	
9	Ironi Beit Dagan	24	7	5	12	38	50	−12	26	
10	Hapoel Bik'at HaYarden	24	7	4	13	50	62	−12	25	
11	Beitar Oranit	24	5	5	14	33	58	−25	20	
12	Maccabi Amishav Petah Tikva	24	2	2	20	35	100	−65	8	
13	Brit Sport Ma'of	24	1	1	22	41	139	−98	4	

Source: rsssf.com
Notes:

Hapoel Neve Golan withdrew.

== Tel Aviv Division ==
Pos	Team	Pld	W	D	L	GF	GA	GD	Pts	Promotion
1	Beitar Holon	26	22	2	2	103	26	+77	68	Promoted to Liga Bet
2	Maccabi Holon	26	21	4	1	91	30	+61	67	Promoted to Liga Bet
3	Ironi Ramla	26	21	3	2	88	24	+64	66	
4	Hapoel Ramat Yisrael	26	15	7	4	56	30	+26	51 (Note: One point deducted.)	
5	Hapoel Tirat Shalom	26	15	3	8	75	46	+29	48	
6	Maccabi Montefiore	26	12	2	12	56	40	+16	38	
7	Beitar Antonio Jaffa	26	10	7	9	46	56	−10	35 (Note: Two points deducted.)	
8	Otzma Holon	26	9	6	11	51	47	+4	33	
9	Beitar Kiryat Ono	26	7	8	11	39	49	−10	29	
10	Elitzur Bar Ilan	26	8	2	16	60	75	−15	26	
11	Hapoel Kiryat Shalom	26	6	3	17	30	63	−33	21	
12	Elitzur Yehud	26	4	5	17	23	61	−38	17	
13	HaTzofim HaOrtodoxim	26	4	3	19	39	92	−53	15	
14	Beitar Ezra	26	0	1	25	19	137	−118	1	

Source: rsssf.com
Notes:

Beitar Bat Yam and Maccabi Dynamo Holon withdrew.

== Central Division ==
Pos	Team	Pld	W	D	L	GF	GA	GD	Pts	Promotion
1	Hapoel Sde Uzziah/Be'er Tuvia	22	18	3	1	73	22	+51	57	Promoted to Liga Bet
2	Beitar Kiryat Gat	22	19	1	2	79	14	+65	55 (Note: Three points deducted.)	Promoted to Liga Bet
3	Hapoel Azrikam	22	11	5	6	40	32	+8	38	
4	ASA Jerusalem	22	11	4	7	59	41	+18	37	
5	Maccabi Ironi Kiryat Malakhi	22	11	3	8	48	47	+1	36	
6	Hapoel Ironi Beit Shemesh	22	10	4	8	44	45	−1	34	
7	Maccabi Rehovot	22	9	4	9	56	52	+4	31	
8	Beitar Giv'at Ze'ev	22	9	3	10	43	45	−2	30	
9	Maccabi Beit Shemesh	22	6	5	11	27	42	−15	23	
10	Hapoel Ramla	22	6	1	15	26	62	−36	19	
11	Hapoel Bnei Ayish	22	4	3	15	26	75	−49	15	
12	Hapoel Ironi Kiryat Malakhi	22	0	0	22	0	44	−44	0 (Note: Hapoel Ironi Kiryat Malakhi were suspended from the league and all their results awarded as 0–2 defeat.)	

Source: rsssf.com
Notes:

Beitar Beit Shemesh and Hapoel Gedera withdrew.

== South Division ==
Pos	Team	Pld	W	D	L	GF	GA	GD	Pts	Promotion
1	Hapoel Rahat	22	16	3	3	47	17	+30	51	Promoted to Liga Bet
2	Moadon Tzeirei Rahat	22	16	2	4	46	16	+30	50	Promoted to Liga Bet
3	A.S. Eilat	22	13	8	1	67	19	+48	47	
4	Hapoel Ironi Netivot	22	12	6	4	56	21	+35	42	
5	Hapoel Kuseife	22	8	10	4	51	35	+16	34	
6	Maccabi Ironi Kuseife	22	9	5	8	33	34	−1	30 (Note: Two points deducted.)	
7	Hapoel al-Huzeil	22	7	2	13	41	56	−15	23	
8	Hapoel Bnei Shimon	22	5	6	11	35	45	−10	21	
9	Hapoel Arad	22	6	3	13	30	48	−18	21	
10	Maccabi Ironi Sderot	22	4	7	11	29	49	−20	19	
11	Maccabi Ironi Rahat	22	4	2	16	29	71	−42	14	
12	Hapoel Mitzpe Ramon	22	3	4	15	30	83	−53	13	

Source: rsssf.com
Notes:

Hapoel Bnei Laqiya withdrew.

== See also ==
- 1999–2000 Israeli Premier League
- 1999–2000 Liga Leumit
- 1999–2000 Liga Artzit
- 1999–2000 Liga Alef
- 1999–2000 Liga Bet
- 1999–2000 Israel State Cup
