= 1996–97 Liga Bet =

Israeli football season

The 1996–97 Liga Bet season saw Hapoel Majd al-Krum, Maccabi Tur'an, Hapoel Nahlat Yehuda and Maccabi Ashkelon win their regional divisions and promoted to Liga Alef.

At the bottom, Hapoel Bnei Tamra, Maccabi Givat HaRakafot, Maccabi Kabul (from North A division), Hapoel Givat Olga, Maccabi Tzur Shalom, Ironi Sayid Umm al-Fahm (from North B division), Hapoel Mahane Yehuda, Beitar Bat Yam, Beitar Jaffa (from South A division), Beitar Netiv Ashdod and Hapoel Gedera (from South B division) were all automatically relegated to Liga Gimel.

== North A division ==
Pos	Team	Pld	W	D	L	GF	GA	GD	Pts	Promotion or relegation
1	Hapoel Majd al-Krum	30	18	7	5	52	28	+24	61	Promoted to Liga Alef
2	Hapoel Arraba	30	16	8	6	62	43	+19	56	
3	Tzeirei Nahf	30	13	10	7	39	29	+10	49	
4	Hapoel Kafr Sumei	30	10	12	8	39	33	+6	42	
5	Hapoel Sakhnin	30	9	15	6	48	40	+8	42	
6	Hapoel Bnei Nazareth	30	10	11	9	37	31	+6	41	
7	Maccabi Sektzia Ma'alot-Tarshiha	30	10	11	9	31	29	+2	41	
8	Hapoel Bu'eine	30	11	7	12	28	36	−8	40	
9	Hapoel Deir Hanna	30	9	13	8	41	34	+7	40	
10	Hapoel Hurfeish	30	11	6	13	44	47	−3	39	
11	Hapoel Tuba	30	10	9	11	35	31	+4	39	
12	Beitar Hatzor	30	8	14	8	34	35	−1	38	
13	Hapoel Ein Mahil	30	10	7	13	46	51	−5	37	
14	Hapoel Bnei Tamra	30	10	7	13	32	39	−7	37	Relegated to Liga Gimel
15	Maccabi Givat HaRakafot	30	7	14	9	33	29	+4	35	Relegated to Liga Gimel
16	Maccabi Kabul	30	0	5	25	7	73	−66	5	Relegated to Liga Gimel

== North B division ==
Pos	Team	Pld	W	D	L	GF	GA	GD	Pts	Promotion or relegation
1	Maccabi Tur'an	30	21	7	2	82	21	+61	69 (Note: One point deducted.)	Promoted to Liga Alef
2	Hapoel Kafr Qara	30	20	8	2	53	18	+35	67	
3	Maccabi Umm al-Fahm	30	15	6	9	40	34	+6	51	
4	Hapoel Nahliel	30	13	8	9	37	30	+7	47	
5	Hapoel Barta'a	30	11	9	10	41	52	−11	42	
6	Maccabi Kiryat Bialik	30	11	8	11	41	44	−3	41	
7	Hapoel Fureidis	30	10	11	9	40	37	+3	41	
8	Maccabi Or Akiva	30	10	9	11	31	40	−9	39	
9	Hapoel Arab Nujeidat	30	9	10	11	39	46	−7	37	
10	Hapoel Bir al-Maksur	30	8	13	9	42	43	−1	37	
11	Maccabi Ironi Tirat HaCarmel	30	9	7	14	28	37	−9	34	
12	Maccabi Ironi Baqa al-Gharbiyye	30	9	7	14	37	46	−9	34	
13	Hapoel Reineh	30	6	15	9	28	35	−7	33	
14	Hapoel Givat Olga	30	8	4	18	37	54	−17	28	Relegated to Liga Gimel
15	Maccabi Tzur Shalom	30	7	6	17	39	50	−11	27	Relegated to Liga Gimel
16	Ironi Sayid Umm al-Fahm	30	6	6	18	30	59	−29	24	Relegated to Liga Gimel

== South A division ==
Pos	Team	Pld	W	D	L	GF	GA	GD	Pts	Promotion or relegation
1	Hapoel Nahlat Yehuda	30	20	6	4	68	30	+38	66	Promoted to Liga Alef
2	M.M. Givat Shmuel	30	16	5	9	46	27	+19	53	
3	Hapoel Azor	30	16	5	9	53	37	+16	53	
4	Maccabi Bat Yam	30	14	7	9	44	27	+17	49	
5	Hapoel Hod HaSharon	30	13	10	7	49	37	+12	49	
6	Hapoel Ra'anana	30	13	9	8	46	33	+13	48	
7	Maccabi Qalansawe	30	12	12	6	42	32	+10	48	
8	Hapoel Herzliya	30	12	6	12	39	30	+9	42	
9	Beitar Kfar Saba	30	11	6	13	40	47	−7	39	
10	Beitar Kfar Yona	30	10	8	12	29	36	−7	38	
11	Maccabi Holon	30	11	3	16	42	57	−15	36	
12	Maccabi Kafr Qasim	30	10	7	13	36	41	−5	35 (Note: Two points deducted.)	
13	Hapoel Tira	30	9	10	11	40	39	+1	35	
14	Hapoel Mahane Yehuda	30	7	11	12	35	44	−9	32	Relegated to Liga Gimel
15	Beitar Bat Yam	30	4	7	19	30	68	−38	19	Relegated to Liga Gimel
16	Beitar Jaffa	30	3	6	21	20	74	−54	15	Relegated to Liga Gimel

== South B division ==
Pos	Team	Pld	W	D	L	GF	GA	GD	Pts	Promotion or relegation
1	Maccabi Ashkelon	30	18	11	1	52	15	+37	64 (Note: 1 point deducted?)	Promoted to Liga Alef
2	Hapoel Eilat	30	19	6	5	48	18	+30	63	
3	A.S. Ramat Eliyahu	30	16	12	2	52	15	+37	60	
4	Ironi Ofakim	30	14	4	12	45	38	+7	46	
5	Maccabi Ben Zvi	30	14	4	12	50	38	+12	46	
6	Hapoel Bnei Lakhish	30	11	11	8	48	42	+6	43	
7	Hapoel Be'er Ya'akov	30	10	11	9	34	31	+3	41	
8	Hapoel Marmorek	30	11	7	12	49	42	+7	40	
9	Hapoel Merhavim	30	11	6	13	33	48	−15	39	
10	Beitar Beit Shemesh	30	10	9	11	47	41	+6	39	
11	Hapoel Mevaseret Zion	30	10	8	12	51	43	+8	38	
12	Hapoel Bnei Laqiya	30	10	4	16	46	56	−10	34	
13	Beitar Lod	30	10	2	18	36	74	−38	32	
14	Maccabi Neve Alon Lod	30	8	8	14	41	54	−13	32	
15	Beitar Netiv Ashdod	30	8	4	18	33	56	−23	28	Relegated to Liga Gimel
16	Hapoel Gedera	30	4	5	21	36	90	−54	17	Relegated to Liga Gimel
