= List of Hapoel Ironi Kiryat Shmona F.C. seasons =

This is a list of seasons played by Hapoel Ironi Kiryat Shmona F.C. in Israeli and European football, from 2000 (when the club was created following a merger between Hapoel Kiryat Shmona and Maccabi Kiryat Shmona) to the most recent completed season. It details the club's achievements in major competitions, and the top scorers for each season. Top scorers in bold were also the top scorers in the Israeli league that season.

The club has won the League Championship once, the State Cup once, the Toto Cup twice (as well as two Second Division Toto Cup) and the Super Cup once.

== History ==
Ironi Kiryat Shmona was created in 2000 with a merger between two rival Kiryat Shmona clubs, Hapoel and Maccabi. The merged club played in fourth tier Liga Alef for the 2000–01 season, winning the division and gaining promotion to Liga Artzit. The club first promoted to the top division in 2007, after winning Liga Leumit. In 2011–12 the club won the championship.

== Seasons ==
Season	League									State Cup	Toto Cup	Europe	Top goalscorer	
Season	Division	P	W	D	L	F	A	Pts	Pos	State Cup	Toto Cup	Europe	Name	Goals
2000–01	Alef	26	19	4	3	64	23	61	**1st**	R6				
2001–02	Artzit	33	10	9	14	50	56	39	8th	QF	RU			
2002–03	Artzit	33	21	7	5	64	31	70	2nd	R8	SF			
2003–04	Leumit	33	13	15	5	49	32	54	3rd	R9	GS			
2004–05	Leumit	33	11	11	11	39	41	44	8th	R9	QF			
2005–06	Leumit	33	12	14	7	39	33	50	3rd	R9	GS			
2006–07	Leumit	33	18	10	5	55	32	64	1st	R9	**Winners**		Yeghia Yavruyan; M'peti Nimba	15
2007–08	Premier	33	15	11	7	43	34	56	3rd	QF	GS		Yero Bello	10
2008–09	Premier	33	6	9	18	24	44	27	12th	R9	QF	2QR	Yuval Avidor	6
2009–10	Leumit	35	21	9	5	51	22	41 (Note: Kiryat Shmona achieved 62 points during the regular season, which were halved at the beginning of the play-offs. The club scored 10 more points during the play-offs for a total of 72 points.)	1st	R8	**Winners**		Tomer Swisa	13
2010–11	Premier	35	14	10	11	57	45	28 (Note: Kiryat Shmona achieved 48 points during the regular season, which were halved at the beginning of the play-offs. The club scored 4 more points during the play-offs for a total of 52 points.)	5th	SF	**Winners**		Weaam Amasha	14
2011–12	Premier	37	21	10	6	48	26	73	**1st**	R9	**Winners**		Shimon Abuhatzira	13
2012–13	Premier	36	16	7	13	50	40	55	5th	RU	QF	POR (UCL); GS (EL)	Shimon Abuhatzira	15
2013–14	Premier	36	18	10	8	59	38	64	3rd	**Winners**			David Manga	11
2014–15	Premier	36	18	10	8	53	38	64	2nd	QF	GS	3QR	Roi Kahat	12
2015–16	Premier	33	8	12	13	32	39	36	11th	R8	RU	3QR	Ofir Mizrahi	10

== Key ==
- P = Played
- W = Games won
- D = Games drawn
- L = Games lost
- F = Goals for
- A = Goals against
- Pts = Points
- Pos = Final position
- Premier = Israeli Premier League
- Leumit = Liga Leumit (National League)
- Artzit = Liga Artzit (Nationwide League)
- Alef = Liga Alef
- F = Final
- RU = runners-up
- SF = Semi-finals
- QF = Quarter-finals
- GS = Group stage
- PORT = Play-Off round
- 1QR = First Qualifying Round
- 2QR = Second Qualifying Round
- 3QR = Third Qualifying Round
- 4QR = Fourth Qualifying Round
- R6 = Round 6
- R7 = Round 7
- R8 = Round 8
- R9 = Round 9

Champions	Runners-up	Promoted	Relegated
