= F.C. Tzeirei Rahat =

Israeli football club

Tzeirei Rahat
- Full name: Rahat Youth Sports Club מועדון כדורגל צעירי רהט
- Founded: 1996
- Ground: Tzeirei Rahat Ground, Rahat
- Owner: Jabber Abu Sehiban
- Manager: Hakim al-Kamlat
- League: Liga Bet South B
- 2023–24: Liga Bet South B, 15th
Home colours	Away colours

Tzeirei Rahat (Hebrew: מועדון צעירי רהט), (Arabic: نادي شباب رهط الرياضي) is an Israeli football club based in the Bedouin city of Rahat. The club is currently in Liga Bet South B division.

== History ==
The club was founded in 1996 in the Bedouin city of Rahat and started at Liga Gimel, the fifth and lowest tier of Israeli football (the sixth from 1999 to 2009). In the 1999–2000 season, Tzeirei Rahat finished runners-up in Liga Gimel South division, after local rivals, Hapoel Rahat, and were eventually promoted to Liga Bet after vacancies were created in the South B division. After two seasons in Liga Bet, the club finished third bottom in their division at the 2001–02 season, and dropped back to Liga Gimel. However, three seasons later, the club made a return to Liga Bet, where they play ever since.

The club's best placing to date came at the 2009–10 Liga Bet, when they finished third in Liga Bet South B division and qualified for the Promotion play-offs, where they beat F.C. Dimona 2–0 in the first round, and lost to Ironi Ramla 4–5 after extra time, in the second round.

== Season History ==
Season	Division	Place	State Cup
1996/97	5ª	10th	-
1997/98	5ª	-	-
1998/99	5ª	-	Third Round
1999/00	6ª	2nd	Third Round
2000/01	5ª	14th	Seventh Round
2001/02	5ª	14th	Second Round
2002/03	6ª	-	Third Round
2003/04	6ª	2nd	-
2004/05	5ª	15th	-
2005/06	5ª	10th	-

Season	Division	Place	State Cup
2006/07	5ª	12th	Second Round
2007/08	5ª	9th	First Round
2008/09	5ª	14th	First Round
2009/10	4ª	3rd	First Round
2010/11	4ª	10th	First Round
2011/12	4ª	13th	Second Round
2012/13	4ª	12th	First Round
2013/14	4ª	8th	First Round
2014/15	4ª	11th	First Round
2015/16	4ª	13th	Third Round

Season	Division	Place	State Cup
2016/17	4ª	7th	Seventh Round
2017/18	4ª	14th	First Round
2018/19	5ª	1st	Second Round
2019/20	4ª	-	First Round

== Honours ==
=== Cups ===
Honour	No.	Years
Liga Bet divisional State Cup	1	2016–17
Liga Gimel South	1	2018–19
