= 2000–01 Israel State Cup =

Tournament details
- Country: Israel

Final positions
- Champions: Maccabi Tel Aviv (20th Title)
- Runners-up: Maccabi Petah Tikva

The 2000–01 Israel State Cup (Hebrew: גביע המדינה, Gvia HaMedina) was the 62nd season of Israel's nationwide football cup competition and the 47th after the Israeli Declaration of Independence.

The competition was won by Maccabi Tel Aviv who had beaten Maccabi Petah Tikva 3–0 in the final.

By winning, Maccabi Tel Aviv qualified to the 2001–02 UEFA Cup, entering in the qualifying round.

== Results ==
=== Seventh Round ===
Home team	Score	Away team
Hapoel Tzeirei Nahf	1–2	Hapoel Kafr Sumei
Maccabi Ramat Amidar	2–2 (a.e.t.) (4–2 p.)	Hapoel Acre
Hapoel Sde Uziyahu Be'er Tuvia	0–2	Hapoel Ra'anana
Hapoel Emek Tamra	2–1	Hapoel Umm al-Fahm
Hapoel Nahlat Yehuda	2–4	Beitar Shimshon Tel Aviv
Maccabi Ashkelon	2–2 (a.e.t.) (5–4 p.)	Hapoel Mevaseret Zion
Maccabi Sha'arayim	1–0	Maccabi Kafr Kanna
Hapoel Hurfeish	0–1	Hapoel Kiryat Ono
Hapoel Tayibe	2–2 (a.e.t.) (4–2 p.)	Hapoel Bat Yam
Moadon Tzeirei Rahat	2–4	Hapoel Ashkelon
Ironi Nir Ramat HaSharon	0–2	Hapoel Nazareth Illit
Hapoel Ironi Hod HaSharon	2–3 (a.e.t.)	Hapoel Asi Gilboa

Byes: Hapoel Majd al-Krum, Ironi Ofakim, Maccabi Isfiya, Maccabi Tur'an.

=== Intermediate Round ===
Home team	Score	Away team
Maccabi Ramat Amidar	4–1	Hapoel Kiryat Ono
Ironi Ofakim	0–0 (a.e.t.) (3–2 p.)	Maccabi Tur'an
Hapoel Ra'anana	0–3	Hapoel Majd al-Krum
Hapoel Kafr Sumei	1–2	Hapoel Asi Gilboa
Maccabi Ashkelon	1–4	Beitar Shimshon Tel Aviv
Hapoel Nazareth Illit	0–1	Hapoel Tayibe
Maccabi Sha'arayim	2–1	Hapoel Emek Tamra
Maccabi Isfiya	1–3	Hapoel Ashkelon

=== Eighth Round ===
Home team	Score	Away team
Maccabi Tel Aviv	7–2	Ironi Ofakim
Maccabi Ramat Amidar	0–1	Hapoel Tel Aviv
Beitar Shimshon Tel Aviv	2–1	Hapoel Majd al-Krum
Bnei Yehuda	6–0	Hapoel Asi Gilboa
Hapoel Be'er Sheva	3–2 (a.e.t.)	Beitar Jerusalem
Hapoel Jerusalem	1–1 (a.e.t.) (1–4 p.)	Hapoel Ashkelon
Hapoel Haifa	3–1	Bnei Sakhnin
Maccabi Kiryat Gat	1–2 (a.e.t.)	Ironi Rishon LeZion
F.C. Ashdod	2–2 (a.e.t.) (5–6 p.)	Hapoel Tzafririm Holon
Maccabi Petah Tikva	5–1	Maccabi Sha'arayim
Hapoel Beit She'an	1–1 (a.e.t.) (2–4 p.)	Maccabi Herzliya
Beitar Be'er Sheva	1–0	Hapoel Petah Tikva
Hapoel Kfar Saba	3–4	Ironi Kiryat Ata
Maccabi Ahi Nazareth	4–2	Hapoel Ramat Gan
Maccabi Netanya	3–0	Hakoah Maccabi Ramat Gan
Maccabi Haifa	4–0	Hapoel Tayibe

=== Round of 16 ===
Home team	Score	Away team
Maccabi Haifa	3–0	Hapoel Tzafririm Holon
Ironi Kiryat Ata	2–1	Beitar Shimshon Tel Aviv
Maccabi Netanya	3–1	Bnei Yehuda
Maccabi Herzliya	1–4	Ironi Rishon LeZion
Hapoel Ashkelon	0–3	Hapoel Be'er Sheva
Maccabi Tel Aviv	3–0	Maccabi Ahi Nazareth
Beitar Be'er Sheva	0–1	Hapoel Tel Aviv
Hapoel Haifa	0–2	Maccabi Petah Tikva

=== Quarter-finals ===
Home team	Score	Away team
Ironi Kiryat Ata	0–2	Maccabi Petah Tikva
Hapoel Be'er Sheva	1–2	Maccabi Haifa
Maccabi Netanya	0–2	Maccabi Tel Aviv
Ironi Rishon LeZion	2–5	Hapoel Tel Aviv

=== Semi-finals ===
Home team	Score	Away team
Maccabi Petah Tikva	3–2 (a.e.t.)	Maccabi Haifa
Maccabi Tel Aviv	2–0	Hapoel Tel Aviv

=== Final ===
22 May 2001

Maccabi Tel Aviv	3–0	Maccabi Petah Tikva
Goldberg 56'; Biton 75'; Nimni 90'

Ramat Gan Stadium
Attendance: 38000
Referee: Tabrizi
