= 2005–06 Liga Bet =

Israeli football season

The 2005–06 Liga Bet season saw Beitar Safed (champions of the North A division), Hapoel Ahva Haifa (champions of the North B division), Maccabi Amishav Petah Tikva (champions of the South A division) and Hapoel Maxim Lod (champions of the South B division) win their regional divisions and promoted to Liga Alef.

The runners-up in each division entered a promotion/relegation play-offs with the clubs ranked 12th in Liga Alef. In the north section, Beitar Haifa (from North B division) won the play-offs and was promoted. In the south section, Ironi Ramla (from South B division) won the play-offs and was promoted.

Maccabi Kiryat Malakhi, which finished third in the South B division, was also promoted to Liga Alef, after a vacancy was created in the South division, following the merger of Beitar Kiryat Gat and Maccabi Kiryat Gat.

At the bottom, Beitar Jaffa, A.S. Holon (from South A division) and Maccabi Yehud (from South B division) were all relegated to Liga Gimel, whilst Hapoel Ironi I'billin (from North A division) and Hapoel Kafr Misr/Nein (from South A division) folded during the season. However, Hapoel Deir Hanna (from North B division), Maccabi Daliyat al-Karmel (from North B division) and Hapoel Bnei Lakhish (from South B division), which finished in the relegation zone, were all reprieved from relegation, after several vacancies were created in Liga Bet for the 2006–07 season, mostly due to withdrawals and mergers of clubs.

== North A Division ==
Pos	Team	Pld	W	D	L	GF	GA	GD	Pts	Promotion or relegation
1	Beitar Safed	28	20	4	4	71	29	+42	64	Promoted to Liga Alef
2	Beitar Haifa	28	17	6	5	83	28	+55	57	Promotion play-offs
3	Maccabi Kafr Sumei	28	15	7	6	50	43	+7	52	
4	Beitar Ihud Mashhad	28	14	8	6	49	29	+20	50	
5	Hapoel Karmiel	28	12	9	7	51	32	+19	45	
6	Hapoel Tuba	28	11	7	10	35	36	−1	40	Withdrew
7	Hapoel Sakhnin	28	10	8	10	50	54	−4	38	
8	Ahva Arraba	28	10	6	12	48	48	0	36	
9	Bnei Abu Snan	28	8	10	10	40	51	−11	34	
10	Hapoel Halat al-Sharif Tamra	28	9	4	15	39	46	−7	31	
11	Beitar Kafr Kanna	28	8	6	14	34	49	−15	30	
12	Hapoel Kisra	28	8	6	14	41	63	−22	30	
13	Maccabi Kafr Yasif	28	6	10	12	39	63	−24	28	
14	Hapoel Yanuh	28	5	8	15	26	59	−33	23	
15	Hapoel Deir Hanna	28	5	5	18	32	58	−26	20	Reprieved from relegation

During the season, Hapoel Ironi I'billin (after 13 matches) folded and its results were annulled.

== North B Division ==
Pos	Team	Pld	W	D	L	GF	GA	GD	Pts	Promotion or qualification
1	Hapoel Ahva Haifa	28	20	7	1	85	19	+66	67	Promoted to Liga Alef
2	Ironi Sayid Umm al-Fahm	28	19	6	3	64	26	+38	63	Promotion play-offs
3	Hapoel Iksal	27	18	3	6	54	28	+26	57	
4	Maccabi Or Akiva	28	17	3	8	53	33	+20	54	
5	Hapoel Mo'atza Ezorit Galil Tahton	28	17	3	8	52	35	+17	54	
6	Hapoel Migdal HaEmek	28	11	5	12	32	36	−4	38	
7	Maccabi Umm al-Fahm	27	11	4	12	49	45	+4	37	
8	Hapoel Isfiya	28	9	4	15	34	52	−18	31	
9	Maccabi Kafr Qara	28	8	6	14	33	42	−9	30	
10	Hapoel Tel Hanan	28	8	6	14	33	57	−24	30	
11	Hapoel Yokneam	28	8	4	16	25	39	−14	28	
12	Maccabi Tur'an	28	7	7	14	34	46	−12	28	
13	Hapoel Ar'ara	28	8	3	17	27	54	−27	27	
14	Hapoel Daliyat al-Karmel	28	8	2	18	25	58	−33	26	
15	Maccabi Daliyat al-Karmel	28	6	5	17	28	58	−30	23	Reprieved from relegation

During the season, Hapoel Kafr Misr/Nein (after 21 matches) folded and its results were annulled.

== South A Division ==
Pos	Team	Pld	W	D	L	GF	GA	GD	Pts	Promotion or relegation
1	Maccabi Amishav Petah Tikva	30	21	6	3	47	19	+28	69	Promoted to Liga Alef
2	Hapoel Azor	30	20	8	2	66	26	+40	68	Promotion play-offs
3	Shimshon Bnei Tayibe	30	19	4	7	53	27	+26	61	
4	Hapoel Mahane Yehuda	30	19	2	9	61	33	+28	59	
5	Hapoel Kiryat Ono	30	17	5	8	57	36	+21	56	
6	Maccabi Ironi Kfar Yona	30	15	9	6	62	27	+35	54	
7	Beitar Kfar Saba	30	16	3	11	48	38	+10	51	
8	Hapoel Hadera	30	13	5	12	43	37	+6	44	
9	Hapoel Hod HaSharon	30	12	3	15	38	49	−11	39	
10	Beitar Ramat Gan	30	11	4	15	48	46	+2	37	
11	Hapoel Ramat Yisrael	30	10	7	13	50	52	−2	37	
12	Hapoel Ihud Bnei Jaffa	30	9	5	16	30	50	−20	32	
13	Hapoel Qalansawe	30	6	5	19	23	54	−31	23	
14	Otzma Holon	30	5	8	17	37	72	−35	23	
15	Beitar Jaffa	30	5	5	20	38	64	−26	20	Relegated to Liga Gimel
16	A.S. Holon	30	1	3	26	33	104	−71	6	Relegated to Liga Gimel

== South B Division ==
Pos	Team	Pld	W	D	L	GF	GA	GD	Pts	Promotion or relegation
1	Hapoel Maxim Lod	30	23	3	4	78	23	+55	72	Promoted to Liga Alef
2	Ironi Ramla	30	21	6	3	71	21	+50	69	Promoted to Liga Alef
3	Maccabi Kiryat Malakhi	30	19	6	5	64	20	+44	63	Promoted to Liga Alef
4	Hapoel Oranit	30	16	7	7	68	40	+28	55	
5	Maccabi Ironi Netivot	30	16	6	8	44	25	+19	54	
6	Hapoel Masos/Segev Shalom	30	16	3	11	62	48	+14	51	
7	Maccabi Ironi Sderot	30	15	5	10	59	32	+27	50	
8	Hapoel Merhavim	30	13	6	11	65	63	+2	45	
9	Maccabi Kiryat Ekron	30	10	7	13	45	47	−2	37	
10	Hapoel Jaljulia	30	10	3	17	34	55	−21	33	
11	Moadon Tzeirei Rahat	30	9	6	15	29	50	−21	33	
12	Hapoel Tirat Shalom	30	9	5	16	44	75	−31	32	
13	Hapoel Tel Sheva	30	6	5	19	31	59	−28	23	
14	F.C. Dimona	30	5	8	17	34	61	−27	23	
15	Hapoel Bnei Lakhish	30	6	3	21	31	86	−55	21	Reprieved from relegation
16	Maccabi Yehud	30	5	3	22	21	75	−54	18	Relegated to Liga Gimel

== Promotion play-offs ==
=== North play-off ===
Liga Bet North A and North B runners-up, Beitar Haifa and Ironi Sayid Umm al-Fahm faced the 12th placed club in Liga Alef North, Maccabi Tamra. The teams played each other in a round-robin tournament, with all matches held at a neutral venue, Kiryat Eliezer Stadium.

24 May 2006

Ironi Sayid Umm al-Fahm	5 - 1	Maccabi Tamra

27 May 2006

Maccabi Tamra	1 - 6	Beitar Haifa

31 May 2006

Ironi Sayid Umm al-Fahm	2 - 7	Beitar Haifa

Pos	Team	Pld	W	D	L	GF	GA	GD	Pts	Promotion or relegation
1	Beitar Haifa	2	2	0	0	13	3	+10	6	Promoted to Liga Alef
2	Ironi Sayid Umm al-Fahm	2	1	0	1	7	8	−1	3	Remained in Liga Bet
3	Maccabi Tamra	2	0	0	2	2	11	−9	0	Relegated to Liga Bet

Beitar Haifa won the play-offs and was promoted to Liga Alef.

=== South play-off ===
Liga Bet South A and Liga Bet South B runners-up, Hapoel Azor and Ironi Ramla faced the 12th placed club in Liga Alef South, Maccabi Sha'arayim. The teams played each other in a round-robin tournament, with all matches held at a neutral venue, Bat Yam Municipal Stadium.

24 May 2006

Ironi Ramla	2 - 1	Hapoel Azor
	Report (in Hebrew)

27 May 2006

Maccabi Sha'arayim	2 - 0	Hapoel Azor
	Report (in Hebrew)

31 May 2006

Ironi Ramla	2 - 1	Maccabi Sha'arayim
	Report (in Hebrew)

Pos	Team	Pld	W	D	L	GF	GA	GD	Pts	Promotion or relegation
1	Ironi Ramla	2	2	0	0	4	2	+2	6	Promoted to Liga Alef
2	Maccabi Sha'arayim	2	1	0	1	3	2	+1	3	Relegated to Liga Bet
2	Hapoel Azor	2	0	0	2	1	4	−3	0	Remained in Liga Bet

Ironi Ramla won the play-offs and was promoted to Liga Alef.
