= 2001–02 Israel State Cup =

Tournament details
- Country: Israel

Final positions
- Champions: Maccabi Tel Aviv (21st Title)
- Runners-up: Maccabi Haifa

The 2001–02 Israel State Cup (Hebrew: גביע המדינה, Gvia HaMedina) was the 63rd season of Israel's nationwide football cup competition and the 48th after the Israeli Declaration of Independence.

The competition was won by Maccabi Tel Aviv who had beaten Maccabi Haifa 5–4 on penalties after 0–0 in the final.

By winning, Maccabi Tel Aviv qualified to the 2002–03 UEFA Cup, entering in the qualifying round.

== Results ==
=== Sixth Round ===
| Home team | Score | Away team |
|---|---|---|
| Maccabi Beit Jann | 0–1 | Hapoel Asi Gilboa |
| Maccabi Tur'an | 0–2 | Hapoel Arraba |
| Maccabi Sektzia Ma'alot | 3–5 (a.e.t.) | Maccabi Tamra |
| Maccabi Tzur Shalom | 1–0 | Bnei Abu Snan |
| Maccabi Hadera | 4–1 | Hapoel Bnei Jadeidi |
| Hapoel Herzliya | 1–4 | Hapoel Kafr Sumei |
| Ironi Sayid Umm al-Fahm | 4–2 | Hapoel Tzeirei Nahf |
| Hapoel Hurfeish | 2–2 (a.e.t.) (3–4 p.) | Hapoel Ahva Haifa |
| Beitar Giv'at Ze'ev | 1–3 | Hapoel Oranit |
| Maccabi HaShikma Ramat Hen | 2–2 (a.e.t.) (2–3 p.) | A.S. Eilat |
| Hapoel Masos Shaqib al-Salam | 3–1 (a.e.t.) | Otzma Holon |
| Maccabi HaSharon Netanya | 1–2 | Maccabi Ramat Amidar |
| Hapoel Nahlat Yehuda | 2–0 | Maccabi Jerusalem/Ma'ale Adumim |
| Maccabi Sha'arayim | 0–1 | Hapoel Marmorek |
| Hapoel Tira | 2–1 | Maccabi Montefiore |
| Hapoel Jaljulia | 3–2 (a.e.t.) | Hapoel Kiryat Ono |

=== Seventh Round ===
| Home team | Score | Away team |
|---|---|---|
| Hapoel Bat Yam | 1–2 | Hapoel Acre |
| Hapoel Jerusalem | 3–2 | Maccabi Yavne |
| Hapoel Nazareth Illit | 2–3 | Hapoel Masos Shaqib al-Salam |
| Hapoel Arraba | 3–2 (a.e.t.) | Hapoel Oranit |
| Hapoel Asi Gilboa | 2–1 (a.e.t.) | Hapoel Ashkelon |
| Maccabi Ramat Amidar | 1–3 | Hapoel Kafr Sumei |
| Hapoel Marmorek | 2–1 (a.e.t.) | A.S. Eilat |
| Ironi Sayid Umm al-Fahm | 3–1 | Hapoel Nahlat Yehuda |
| Maccabi Tamra | 2–0 | Hapoel Jaljulia |
| Ironi Kiryat Ata | 2–1 | Hapoel Majd al-Krum |
| Beitar Shimshon Tel Aviv | 3–0 | Maccabi Tzur Shalom |
| Maccabi Hadera | 0–3 | Hapoel Tayibe |

Byes: Hapoel Ahva Haifa, Hapoel Tira, Ironi Kiryat Shmona, Ironi Nir Ramat HaSharon.

=== Intermediate Round ===
| Home team | Score | Away team |
|---|---|---|
| Ironi Kiryat Ata | 6–2 | Hapoel Asi Gilboa |
| Hapoel Kafr Sumei | 1–0 | Hapoel Arraba |
| Ironi Sayid Umm al-Fahm | 2–0 | Hapoel Marmorek |
| Hapoel Tira | 0–1 | Ironi Kiryat Shmona |
| Hapoel Jerusalem | 1–0 | Beitar Shimshon Tel Aviv |
| Hapoel Masos Shaqib al-Salam | 3–3 (a.e.t.) (3–2 p.) | Maccabi Tamra |
| Hapoel Ahva Haifa | 1–2 | Ironi Nir Ramat HaSharon |
| Hapoel Acre | 2–2 (a.e.t.) (5–4 p.) | Hapoel Tayibe |

=== Eighth Round ===
| Home team | Score | Away team |
|---|---|---|
| Hapoel Jerusalem | 3–0 | Hapoel Haifa |
| Hapoel Ramat Gan | 2–2 (a.e.t.) (2–3 p.) | Ironi Kiryat Ata |
| Maccabi Haifa | 2–1 | Hapoel Be'er Sheva |
| Hakoah Maccabi Ramat Gan | 0–2 (a.e.t.) | Hapoel Petah Tikva |
| Bnei Yehuda | 2–0 | Ironi Rishon LeZion |
| Hapoel Kfar Saba | 0–2 | Maccabi Petah Tikva |
| Maccabi Kiryat Gat | 2–1 (a.e.t.) | Ironi Nir Ramat HaSharon |
| Maccabi Netanya | 6–3 | Hapoel Masos Shaqib al-Salam |
| Hapoel Kafr Sumei | 0–2 | Hapoel Acre |
| Ironi Sayid Umm al-Fahm | 1–3 | Ironi Kiryat Shmona |
| Hapoel Tzafririm Holon | 1–1 (a.e.t.) (5–6 p.) | Maccabi Tel Aviv |
| Hapoel Tel Aviv | 5–0 | Maccabi Ahi Nazareth |
| F.C. Ashdod | 2–1 | Bnei Sakhnin |
| Beitar Be'er Sheva | 1–2 | Hapoel Beit She'an |
| Maccabi Kafr Kanna | 2–5 | Maccabi Herzliya |
| Hapoel Ra'anana | 1–4 | Beitar Jerusalem |

=== Round of 16 ===
| Home team | Score | Away team |
|---|---|---|
| Maccabi Haifa | 5–1 | Maccabi Netanya |
| Ironi Kiryat Ata | 1–5 | Bnei Yehuda |
| Hapoel Petah Tikva | 1–0 | Hapoel Tel Aviv |
| Maccabi Kiryat Gat | 3–3 (a.e.t.) (6–5 p.) | Maccabi Herzliya |
| Hapoel Beit She'an | 1–3 (a.e.t.) | Ironi Kiryat Shmona |
| Hapoel Jerusalem | 1–2 | Maccabi Tel Aviv |
| F.C. Ashdod | 2–7 | Beitar Jerusalem |
| Maccabi Petah Tikva | 1–0 | Hapoel Acre |

=== Quarter-finals ===
| Home team | Score | Away team |
|---|---|---|
| Hapoel Petah Tikva | 1–0 | Maccabi Petah Tikva |
| Maccabi Haifa | 4–0 | Maccabi Kiryat Gat |
| Maccabi Tel Aviv | 6–0 | Ironi Kiryat Shmona |
| Beitar Jerusalem | 4–2 | Bnei Yehuda |

=== Semi-finals ===
| Home team | Score | Away team |
|---|---|---|
| Maccabi Haifa | 1–0 | Beitar Jerusalem |
| Maccabi Tel Aviv | 5–1 | Hapoel Petah Tikva |

=== Final ===
21 May 2002

| Maccabi Tel Aviv | 0–0 | Maccabi Haifa |
Penalties
| | 5–4 |

Ramat Gan Stadium
Attendance: 42000
Referee: Koren
