= 2001–02 Liga Bet =

Israeli football season

The 2001–02 Liga Bet season saw Hapoel Tuba, Maccabi Tzur Shalom, Maccabi HaShikma Ramat Hen and Maccabi Be'er Sheva win their regional divisions and promoted to Liga Alef.

At the bottom, Hapoel Ramot Menashe Megiddo (from North A division), Hapoel Baqa al-Gharbiyye, Maccabi Baqa al-Gharbiyye, Hapoel Fureidis (from North B division), Beitar Holon, Hapoel Kafr Qasim, Maccabi Qalansawe, Beitar Ariel, Beitar Nes Tubruk (from South A division), Moadon Tzeirei Rahat, Maccabi Neve Alon Lod and Hapoel Aliyah Kfar Saba (from South B division) were all automatically relegated to Liga Gimel.

== North A Division ==
Pos	Team	Pld	W	D	L	GF	GA	GD	Pts	Promotion or relegation
1	Hapoel Tuba	26	22	2	2	67	17	+50	68	Promoted to Liga Alef
2	Hapoel Arraba	26	17	4	5	51	32	+19	55	
3	Hapoel Iksal	28	11	8	9	36	28	+8	41	
4	Hapoel Karmiel	27	10	9	8	38	31	+7	39	
5	Ironi Nahariya	28	10	8	10	37	37	0	38	
6	Hapoel Sakhnin	28	10	6	12	33	41	−8	36	
7	Maccabi Sektzia Ma'alot	28	10	5	13	54	45	+9	35	
8	Hapoel Kaukab	28	8	10	10	38	38	0	34	Withdrew
9	Maccabi Bnei Yarka	28	10	4	14	40	56	−16	34	
10	Hapoel Bnei Nazareth	28	8	9	11	39	42	−3	33	
11	Hapoel Deir Hanna	28	8	8	12	35	43	−8	32	
12	Hapoel Kisra	28	8	8	12	26	37	−11	32	
13	Hapoel Makr	27	7	10	10	38	42	−4	31	
14	Hapoel Bnei Manda	28	6	12	10	23	42	−19	30	
15	Hapoel Ramot Menashe Megiddo	28	8	5	15	30	54	−24	29	Relegated to Liga Gimel

== North B Division ==
Pos	Team	Pld	W	D	L	GF	GA	GD	Pts	Promotion or relegation
1	Maccabi Tzur Shalom	30	23	1	6	83	42	+41	70	Promoted to Liga Alef
2	Hapoel Mo'atza Ezorit Galil Tahton	30	22	2	6	58	22	+36	68	
3	Hapoel Reineh	30	18	4	8	75	42	+33	58	
4	Maccabi Isfiya	30	16	5	9	57	43	+14	53	
5	Hapoel Tel Hanan	30	14	9	7	57	33	+24	51	
6	Hapoel Umm al-Fahm	29	13	6	10	48	39	+9	45	
7	Hapoel Ahva Haifa	30	12	8	10	59	47	+12	44	
8	Hapoel Yafa	30	13	4	13	50	50	0	43	
9	Maccabi Kafr Qara	30	12	6	12	42	35	+7	42	
10	Hapoel Bir al-Maksur	29	12	6	11	51	50	+1	42	
11	Hapoel Emek Tamra	29	11	6	12	53	54	−1	39	
12	Hapoel Nahliel	29	11	3	15	53	56	−3	36	
13	Hapoel Daliyat al-Karmel	28	8	10	10	35	33	+2	34	
14	Hapoel Baqa al-Gharbiyye	29	6	5	18	38	75	−37	23	Relegated to Liga Gimel
15	Maccabi Baqa al-Gharbiyye	30	6	1	23	38	78	−40	19	Relegated to Liga Gimel
16	Hapoel Fureidis	29	0	2	27	19	117	−98	2	Relegated to Liga Gimel

== South A Division ==
Pos	Team	Pld	W	D	L	GF	GA	GD	Pts	Promotion or relegation
1	Maccabi HaShikma Ramat Hen	34	26	6	2	111	23	+88	84	Promoted to Liga Alef
2	Hapoel Hod HaSharon	33	25	2	6	82	37	+45	77	
3	Otzma Holon	34	22	6	6	84	35	+49	72	
4	Beitar Ramat Gan	34	22	3	9	80	47	+33	69	
5	Hapoel Mahane Yehuda	34	19	8	7	76	43	+33	65	
6	Maccabi Holon	34	15	6	13	69	58	+11	51	
7	Hapoel Qalansawe	34	13	9	12	58	46	+12	48	
8	Maccabi Yehud	33	12	7	14	53	53	0	43	
9	Hapoel Ar'ara	34	12	6	16	50	86	−36	42	
10	Hapoel Azor	34	10	9	15	46	47	−1	39	
11	Shimshon Bnei Tayibe	33	10	8	15	49	73	−24	38	
12	Beitar Jaffa	34	11	4	19	51	80	−29	36 (Note: One point deducted)	
13	M.M. Givat Shmuel	33	11	3	19	53	83	−30	36	
14	Beitar Holon	34	10	4	20	40	69	−29	34	Relegated to Liga Gimel
15	Hapoel Kafr Qasim	33	9	6	18	46	57	−11	33	Relegated to Liga Gimel
16	Maccabi Qalansawe	34	7	14	13	48	72	−24	33 (Note: Two points deducted)	Relegated to Liga Gimel
17	Beitar Ariel	34	6	7	21	34	71	−37	25	Relegated to Liga Gimel
18	Beitar Nes Tubruk	33	7	4	22	39	89	−50	25	Relegated to Liga Gimel

== South B Division ==
Pos	Team	Pld	W	D	L	GF	GA	GD	Pts	Promotion or relegation
1	Maccabi Be'er Sheva	30	26	2	2	87	22	+65	80	Promoted to Liga Alef
2	A.S. Eilat	30	25	3	2	85	23	+62	78	
3	Hapoel Masos/Segev Shalom	30	19	5	6	77	30	+47	62	
4	Hapoel Arad	30	13	9	8	43	24	+19	48	
5	Hapoel Merhavim	30	14	6	10	54	39	+15	48	
6	Maccabi Ben Zvi	30	14	5	11	49	36	+13	47	
7	Ironi Ramla	30	13	2	15	55	58	−3	41	
8	Hapoel Bnei Lakhish	30	11	6	13	37	35	+2	39	
9	Hapoel Bnei Lod	30	9	7	14	25	50	−25	34	
10	Hapoel Yeruham	30	7	11	12	30	39	−9	31 (Note: One point deducted)	
11	Maccabi Kiryat Ekron	30	7	9	14	34	45	−11	30	
12	Beitar Giv'at Ze'ev	30	6	12	12	30	50	−20	30	
13	Hapoel Sde Uzziah	30	8	6	16	35	58	−23	29	
14	Moadon Tzeirei Rahat	30	8	4	18	31	66	−35	28	Relegated to Liga Gimel
15	Maccabi Neve Alon Lod	30	8	4	18	31	67	−36	28	Relegated to Liga Gimel
16	Hapoel Aliyah Kfar Saba	30	4	5	21	23	84	−61	17	Relegated to Liga Gimel
