= 2002–03 Israel State Cup =

Tournament details
- Country: Israel

Final positions
- Champions: Hapoel Ramat Gan
- Runners-up: Hapoel Be'er Sheva

The 2002–03 Israel State Cup (Hebrew: גביע המדינה, Gvia HaMedina) was the 64th season of Israel's nationwide football cup competition and the 49th after the Israeli Declaration of Independence.

The competition was won by Hapoel Ramat Gan who had beaten Hapoel Be'er Sheva 5–4 on penalties after 1–1 in the final. This is the first time the cup was won by a club outside the top division.

By winning, Hapoel Ramat Gan qualified to the 2003–04 UEFA Cup, entering in the first round.

== Results ==
=== Seventh Round ===
Home team	Score	Away team
Beitar Shimshon Tel Aviv	1–2	Ironi Kiryat Shmona
Hapoel Majd al-Krum	3–3 (a.e.t.) (4–5 p.)	Maccabi Be'er Sheva
Hapoel Asi Gilboa	3–1 (a.e.t.)	Hapoel Ashkelon
Maccabi Ramat Amidar	3–2	Hapoel Tzeirei Nahf
Maccabi Sha'arayim	1–2 (a.e.t.)	Hakoah Maccabi Ramat Gan
Hapoel Tuba	3–1	Hapoel Marmorek
Ironi Kiryat Ata	3–0	Maccabi Holon Bat Yam
Maccabi Sektzia Ma'alot	0–2	Hapoel Kafr Sumei
Hapoel Herzliya	2–1	Maccabi Tamra
Hapoel Acre	3–1	Hapoel Iksal
Maccabi Shefa-'Amr	0–1	Ironi Ofakim
Ironi Nir Ramat HaSharon	0–2	Hapoel Kfar Shalem

Byes: Hapoel Bat Yam, Hapoel Beit She'an, Hapoel Nahlat Yehuda, Maccabi HaShikma Ramat Hen.

=== Intermediate Round ===
Home team	Score	Away team
Hapoel Tuba	0–0 (a.e.t.) (4–2 p.)	Maccabi Ramat Amidar
Hapoel Nahlat Yehuda	1–3	Hapoel Bat Yam
Hakoah Maccabi Ramat Gan	3–1	Hapoel Kafr Sumei
Hapoel Asi Gilboa	0–5	Ironi Kiryat Shmona
Ironi Kiryat Ata	(6–5 p.)	Hapoel Beit She'an
Hapoel Acre	1–0	Maccabi HaShikma Ramat Hen
Hapoel Herzliya	3–2	Maccabi Be'er Sheva
Ironi Ofakim	2–1	Hapoel Kfar Shalem

=== Eighth Round ===
Home team	Score	Away team
Bnei Sakhnin	2–0	Beitar Be'er Sheva
Maccabi Kafr Kanna	0–0 (a.e.t.) (5–4 p.)	Hapoel Acre
Maccabi Tel Aviv	5–3	Beitar Jerusalem
Maccabi Petah Tikva	2–1	Ironi Rishon LeZion
Hapoel Tzafririm Holon	1–2	Hapoel Be'er Sheva
Bnei Yehuda	2–0	Ironi Kiryat Ata
Maccabi Ahi Nazareth	5–0	Ironi Kiryat Shmona
Hapoel Bat Yam	1–2	Hapoel Ra'anana
Hapoel Tel Aviv	1–0	F.C. Ashdod
Hakoah Maccabi Ramat Gan	1–2	Hapoel Haifa
Hapoel Jerusalem	1–1 (a.e.t.) (3–4 p.)	Hapoel Ramat Gan
Ironi Ofakim	1–3	Hapoel Tuba
Hapoel Nazareth Illit	2–1	Hapoel Petah Tikva
Maccabi Kiryat Gat	2–1	Hapoel Herzliya
Hapoel Kfar Saba	2–1	Maccabi Herzliya
Maccabi Netanya	0–2	Maccabi Haifa

=== Round of 16 ===
Home team	Score	Away team
Maccabi Haifa	1–0	Hapoel Kfar Saba
Maccabi Ahi Nazareth	0–1 (a.e.t.)	Bnei Yehuda
Hapoel Tel Aviv	0–1	Hapoel Be'er Sheva
Maccabi Kiryat Gat	2–1	Hapoel Nazareth Illit
Maccabi Kafr Kanna	3–2	Hapoel Ra'anana
Maccabi Tel Aviv	1–0 (a.e.t.)	Hapoel Tuba
Bnei Sakhnin	1–1 (a.e.t.) (5–4 p.)	Hapoel Haifa
Hapoel Ramat Gan	0–0 (a.e.t.) (7–6 p.)	Maccabi Petah Tikva

=== Quarter-finals ===
Home team	Score	Away team
Maccabi Kiryat Gat	0–2	Hapoel Be'er Sheva
Maccabi Kafr Kanna	0–7	Maccabi Haifa
Maccabi Tel Aviv	1–0 (a.e.t.)	Bnei Yehuda
Hapoel Ramat Gan	1–0	Bnei Sakhnin

=== Semi-finals ===
Home team	Score	Away team
Hapoel Ramat Gan	2–1	Maccabi Tel Aviv
Hapoel Be'er Sheva	3–0	Maccabi Haifa

=== Final ===
27 May 2003

Hapoel Ramat Gan	1–1 (a.e.t.)	Hapoel Be'er Sheva
Halewani 55'		Haim 87'
Penalties
Baruch (penalty scored); Shapira (penalty scored); Azarya (penalty scored); Kaduri (penalty scored); Tepper (penalty scored)	5–4	(penalty missed) Eliyahu; (penalty scored) Abu Laban; (penalty scored) Madunović; (penalty scored) Kaku; (penalty scored) Sagron

Ramat Gan Stadium
Attendance: 30000
Referee: Ben Hemo
