= 2000–01 Liga Alef =

Israeli football season

The 2000–01 Liga Alef season saw Hapoel Ironi Kiryat Shmona (champions of the North Division) and Maccabi Yavne (champions of the South Division) winning the title and promotion to Liga Artzit.

At the bottom, Maccabi Isfiya, Hapoel Iksal (from North division), Hapoel Ihud Tzeirei Jaffa and Sektzia Nes Tziona (from South division) were all automatically relegated to Liga Bet.

== North Division ==
Pos	Team	Pld	W	D	L	GF	GA	GD	Pts	Promotion or relegation
1	Hapoel Ironi Kiryat Shmona	26	19	4	3	64	23	+41	61	Promoted to Liga Artzit
2	Hapoel Hadera	26	17	4	5	65	26	+39	55	
3	Maccabi Hadera	26	10	6	10	32	36	−4	36	
4	Hapoel Kafr Kanna	26	9	8	9	32	35	−3	35	
5	Maccabi Tamra	26	9	7	10	26	25	+1	34	
6	Tzeirei Nahf	26	8	10	8	35	37	−2	34	
7	Maccabi Shefa-'Amr	26	10	4	12	33	44	−11	34	
8	Hapoel Kafr Sumei	26	9	6	11	36	38	−2	33	
9	Hapoel Migdal HaEmek	26	9	6	11	40	44	−4	33	
10	Maccabi Tur'an	26	7	10	9	28	32	−4	31	
11	Maccabi Ironi Tirat HaCarmel	26	8	6	12	25	36	−11	30	
12	Hapoel Hurfeish	26	7	9	10	23	38	−15	30	
13	Maccabi Isfiya	26	8	5	13	40	47	−7	29	Relegated to Liga Bet
14	Hapoel Iksal	26	7	5	14	28	46	−18	26	Relegated to Liga Bet

== South Division ==
Pos	Team	Pld	W	D	L	GF	GA	GD	Pts	Promotion or relegation
1	Maccabi Yavne	28	19	5	4	54	19	+35	62	Promoted to Liga Artzit
2	Maccabi Ramat Amidar	28	19	4	5	61	20	+41	61	
3	A.S. Ramat Eliyahu	28	18	7	3	46	20	+26	61	
4	Hapoel Herzliya	28	14	7	7	48	20	+28	49	
5	Hapoel Mevaseret Zion	28	13	4	11	46	30	+16	43	
6	Hapoel Dimona	28	10	10	8	36	32	+4	40	
7	Hapoel Marmorek	28	11	6	11	37	34	+3	39	
8	Hapoel Kfar Shalem	28	11	5	12	35	32	+3	38	
9	Hapoel Nahlat Yehuda	28	9	10	9	31	31	0	37	
10	Hapoel Jaljulia	28	8	9	11	35	38	−3	33	
11	Maccabi Jerusalem/Ma'ale Adumim	28	8	7	13	39	54	−15	31	
12	Hapoel Kiryat Ono	28	8	7	13	31	46	−15	31	
13	Hapoel Lod	28	8	4	16	35	59	−24	28	
14	Hapoel Ihud Tzeirei Jaffa	28	4	10	14	21	46	−25	22	Relegated to Liga Bet
15	Sektzia Nes Tziona	28	2	1	25	14	88	−74	7	Relegated to Liga Bet
