= 1999–2000 Israel State Cup =

Tournament details
- Country: Israel

Final positions
- Champions: Hapoel Tel Aviv (10th Title)
- Runners-up: Beitar Jerusalem

The 1999–2000 Israel State Cup (Hebrew: גביע המדינה, Gvia HaMedina) was the 61st season of Israel's nationwide football cup competition and the 46th after the Israeli Declaration of Independence.

The competition was won by Hapoel Tel Aviv who had beaten Beitar Jerusalem 4–2 on penalties after 2–2 in the final.

As Hapoel Tel Aviv won the double, Beitar Jerusalem qualified to the 2000–01 UEFA Cup, entering in the qualifying round.

== Results ==
=== Seventh Round ===
Home team	Score	Away team
Beitar Tel Aviv	3–1	Hapoel Ra'anana
Hapoel Nir Ramat HaSharon	2–2 (a.e.t.) (3–1 p.)	Maccabi Hadera
Maccabi Sha'arayim	2–4	Hapoel Bat Yam
Hapoel Tayibe	3–2 (a.e.t.)	Hapoel Asi Gilboa
A.S. Ramat Eliyahu	3–2 (a.e.t.)	Hapoel Kafr Sumei
Maccabi Ashkelon	7–1	Hapoel Fureidis
Hapoel Sde Uziyahu Be'er Tuvia	4–1	Hapoel Masos Shaqib al-Salam
Hapoel Iksal	1–4	Hapoel Kiryat Shmona
Hapoel Mevaseret Zion	0–1	Hapoel Majd al-Krum
Hapoel Acre	3–4	Maccabi Kafr Kanna
Hapoel Ramat Gan	2–0	Hapoel Kiryat Ono
Hapoel Peki'in	1–3	Shimshon Tel Aviv

Byes: Hapoel Ironi Dimona, Hapoel Ironi Hod HaSharon, Hapoel Makr, Hapoel Nazareth Illit.

=== Intermediate Round ===
Home team	Score	Away team
Hapoel Sde Uziyahu Be'er Tuvia	1–1 (a.e.t.) (3–5 p.)	Beitar Tel Aviv
Hapoel Nir Ramat HaSharon	5–0	Hapoel Makr
Shimshon Tel Aviv	1–7	Maccabi Kafr Kanna
Maccabi Ashkelon	3–1	Hapoel Bat Yam
Hapoel Nazareth Illit	1–1 (a.e.t.) (4–3 p.)	Hapoel Kiryat Shmona
Hapoel Ironi Hod HaSharon	4–1	Hapoel Majd al-Krum
Hapoel Tayibe	2–3	Hapoel Ramat Gan
A.S. Ramat Eliyahu	0–3	Hapoel Ironi Dimona

=== Eighth Round ===
Home team	Score	Away team
Hapoel Petah Tikva	2–2 (a.e.t.) (2–3 p.)	Maccabi Haifa
Beitar Jerusalem	2–0	Hapoel Jerusalem
F.C. Ashdod	0–2	Maccabi Petah Tikva
Hapoel Haifa	2–0	Ironi Rishon LeZion
Maccabi Acre	1–2	Hapoel Tel Aviv
Hapoel Ironi Hod HaSharon	0–7	Maccabi Tel Aviv
Beitar Be'er Sheva	1–0	Bnei Yehuda
Hapoel Kfar Saba	2–0	Hapoel Nir Ramat HaSharon
Hapoel Ashkelon	1–0	Maccabi Ashkelon
Hapoel Be'er Sheva	3–1 (a.e.t.)	Maccabi Kiryat Gat
Maccabi Ahi Nazareth	2–0	Hapoel Ramat Gan
Hapoel Tzafririm Holon	1–0	Hakoah Maccabi Ramat Gan
Hapoel Ironi Dimona	0–3	Maccabi Netanya
Beitar Tel Aviv	1–1 (a.e.t.) (4–2 p.)	Bnei Sakhnin
Hapoel Nazareth Illit	0–2	Maccabi Kafr Kanna
Hapoel Beit She'an	1–2	Maccabi Herzliya

=== Round of 16 ===
Home team	Score	Away team
Hapoel Haifa	2–2 (a.e.t.) (5–6 p.)	Maccabi Haifa
Beitar Tel Aviv	2–1	Maccabi Ahi Nazareth
Maccabi Netanya	3–0	Maccabi Herzliya
Beitar Be'er Sheva	1–1 (a.e.t.) (6–7 p.)	Beitar Jerusalem
Hapoel Ashkelon	1–2	Hapoel Be'er Sheva
Maccabi Kafr Kanna	1–3	Hapoel Kfar Saba
Hapoel Tel Aviv	2–0	Maccabi Tel Aviv
Maccabi Petah Tikva	2–1	Hapoel Tzafririm Holon

=== Quarter-finals ===
Home team	Score	Away team
Hapoel Kfar Saba	1–1 (a.e.t.) (3–2 p.)	Maccabi Petah Tikva
Maccabi Haifa	4–0	Beitar Tel Aviv
Maccabi Netanya	3–3 (a.e.t.) (8–9 p.)	Beitar Jerusalem
Hapoel Be'er Sheva	0–2	Hapoel Tel Aviv

=== Semi-finals ===
Home team	Score	Away team
Beitar Jerusalem	3–2	Hapoel Kfar Saba
Hapoel Tel Aviv	0–0 (a.e.t.) (2–1 p.)	Maccabi Haifa

=== Final ===
17 May 2000

Hapoel Tel Aviv	2–2 (a.e.t.)	Beitar Jerusalem
Računica 87'; Tuama 115'		Paço 90', 118'
Penalties
	4–2

Ramat Gan Stadium
Attendance: 40000
Referee: Levi
