= 1999–2000 Liga Bet =

Israeli football season

The 1999–2000 Liga Bet season saw Tzeirei Nahf, Maccabi Ironi Tirat HaCarmel, Hapoel Herzliya and Hapoel Marmorek win their regional divisions and promoted to Liga Alef.

Second placed clubs, Hapoel Kafr Sumei, Hapoel Jaljulia and Maccabi Jerusalem/Ma'ale Adumim were also promoted, after several vacancies were created in Liga Alef.

At the bottom, Maccabi Givat HaRakafot (from North A division), Ironi Zikhron Ya'akov, Hapoel Barta'a, Maccabi Beit She'an (from North B division) and Hapoel Ar'ara (from South A division) were all automatically relegated to Liga Gimel.

== North A division ==
Pos	Team	Pld	W	D	L	GF	GA	GD	Pts	Promotion or relegation
1	Tzeirei Nahf	30	25	3	2	76	13	+63	78	Promoted to Liga Alef
2	Hapoel Kafr Sumei	30	24	3	3	69	29	+40	75	Promoted to Liga Alef
3	Maccabi Ironi Shlomi	30	21	3	6	93	35	+58	66	
4	Hapoel Tuba	30	20	5	5	76	30	+46	65	
5	Maccabi Kiryat Shmona	30	13	4	13	49	42	+7	43	Merged with Hapoel Kiryat Shmona
6	Ironi Nahariya	30	12	5	13	58	56	+2	41	
7	Hapoel Kaukab	30	11	6	13	46	43	+3	39	
8	Hapoel Deir Hanna	30	10	7	13	40	48	−8	37	
9	Ironi I'billin	30	11	3	16	31	54	−23	36	
10	Hapoel Sakhnin	30	9	9	12	44	52	−8	36	
11	Hapoel Arraba	30	11	2	17	42	51	−9	35	
12	Hapoel Bnei Kafr Yasif	30	10	4	16	39	53	−14	34	
13	Hapoel Bnei Nazareth	30	9	6	15	43	55	−12	33	
14	Maccabi Sektzia Ma'alot	30	9	6	15	43	56	−13	33	
15	Hapoel Tel Hanan	30	10	2	18	34	69	−35	32	
16	Maccabi Givat HaRakafot (Note: Maccabi Givat HaRakafot withdrew after 15 rounds. All their games from round 16 awarded 0-2.)	30	0	2	28	7	104	−97	2	Relegated to Liga Gimel

Source: rsssf.com

== North B division ==
Pos	Team	Pld	W	D	L	GF	GA	GD	Pts	Promotion or relegation
1	Maccabi Ironi Tirat HaCarmel	30	22	5	3	85	24	+61	71	Promoted to Liga Alef
2	Hapoel Mo'atza Ezorit Galil Tahton	30	16	7	7	48	30	+18	55	
3	Hapoel Asi Gilboa	30	15	8	7	89	51	+38	53	
4	Hapoel Umm al-Fahm	30	14	9	7	60	30	+30	48 (Note: Three points deducted)	
5	Maccabi Ironi Baqa al-Gharbiyye	30	14	6	10	59	61	−2	48	
6	Hapoel Reineh	30	13	7	10	55	47	+8	45 (Note: One point deducted)	
7	Hapoel Bir al-Maksur	30	12	9	9	50	47	+3	45	
8	Ironi Sayid Umm al-Fahm	30	12	6	12	78	47	+31	42	
9	Hapoel Fureidis	30	8	13	9	48	47	+1	37	
10	Hapoel Nahliel	30	10	6	14	37	57	−20	36	
11	Beitar Iksal	30	9	9	12	49	54	−5	36	
12	Hapoel Daliyat al-Karmel	30	8	12	10	47	70	−23	36	
13	Hapoel Arab Nujeidat	30	10	8	12	38	65	−27	35	
14	Ironi Zikhron Ya'akov	30	8	8	14	46	57	−11	32	Relegated to Liga Gimel
15	Hapoel Barta'a	30	7	7	16	47	61	−14	28	Relegated to Liga Gimel
16	Maccabi Beit She'an	30	1	2	27	34	122	−88	5	Relegated to Liga Gimel

Source: rsssf.com

== South A division ==
Pos	Team	Pld	W	D	L	GF	GA	GD	Pts	Promotion or relegation
1	Hapoel Herzliya	26	21	4	1	69	17	+52	67	Promoted to Liga Alef
2	Hapoel Jaljulia	26	12	9	5	33	22	+11	45	Promoted to Liga Alef
3	Hapoel Azor	27	13	4	10	40	34	+6	43	
4	Beitar Ramat Gan	26	10	8	8	37	30	+7	38	
5	Hapoel Mahane Yehuda	26	10	8	8	41	37	+4	38	
6	Hapoel Ironi Hod HaSharon	26	10	7	9	58	40	+18	37	
7	Maccabi Kafr Qasim	26	9	6	11	21	31	−10	33	
8	M.M. Givat Shmuel	26	9	5	12	27	51	−24	32	
9	Maccabi Bnei Tira	26	9	4	13	29	41	−12	31	
10	Hapoel Kafr Qasim	26	8	7	11	24	31	−7	31	
11	Hapoel Tira	26	7	10	9	29	32	−3	31	
12	Beitar Nes Tubruk	26	8	6	12	30	42	−12	30	
13	Maccabi HaShikma Ramat Hen	26	7	8	11	34	35	−1	29	
14	Hapoel Ar'ara	26	4	4	18	18	47	−29	14 (Note: Two points deducted)	Relegated to Liga Gimel

Source: rsssf.com
Notes:

Beitar Kfar Saba and Maccabi Bat Yam withdrew.

== South B division ==
Pos	Team	Pld	W	D	L	GF	GA	GD	Pts	Promotion
1	Hapoel Marmorek	22	18	3	1	55	20	+35	57	Promoted to Liga Alef
2	Maccabi Jerusalem/Ma'ale Adumim	22	18	2	2	75	20	+55	56	Promoted to Liga Alef
3	Ironi Ofakim	22	14	3	5	47	16	+31	45	
4	Hapoel Masos/Segev Shalom	22	13	6	3	52	25	+27	45	
5	Maccabi Ben Zvi	22	9	6	7	54	34	+20	33	
6	Maccabi Be'er Sheva	22	9	5	8	39	25	+14	32	
7	Hapoel Bnei Lakhish	22	9	3	10	39	54	−15	30	
8	Hapoel Bnei Lod	22	7	3	12	20	46	−26	24	
9	Hapoel Merhavim	22	3	6	13	21	42	−21	15	
10	Hapoel Yeruham	22	3	4	15	29	57	−28	13	
11	Maccabi Kiryat Ekron	22	2	5	15	22	58	−36	11	
12	Maccabi Neve Alon Lod	22	2	4	16	23	79	−56	10	

Source: rsssf.com

Beitar Ramla and Hapoel Eilat were suspended; Hapoel Be'er Ya'akov and Maccabi Shikun Hamizrah withdrew.
