= 1999–2000 Liga Alef =

Israeli football season

The 1999–2000 Liga Alef season saw Hapoel Majd al-Krum (champions of the North Division) and Maccabi Ashkelon (champions of the South Division) winning the title and promotion to Liga Artzit. At the end of the season, Liga Artzit clubs, Beitar Tel Aviv and Shimshon Tel Aviv merged to form Beitar Shimshon Tel Aviv, and Hapoel Nir Ramat HaSharon were also promoted.

At the bottom, Maccabi Afula (from North division) and Hapoel Or Yehuda (from South division) were all automatically relegated to Liga Bet, whilst Sektzia Nes Tziona were reprieved from relegation, after Maccabi Lazarus Holon folded at the end of the season.

== North Division ==
Pos	Team	Pld	W	D	L	GF	GA	GD	Pts	Promotion or relegation
1	Hapoel Majd al-Krum	24	19	4	1	63	19	+44	61	Promoted to Liga Artzit
2	Hapoel Hadera	24	15	4	5	51	25	+26	49	
3	Maccabi Tamra (Note: Maccabi Tamra was dismissed from the league after the 23rd round due to crowd violence. The remainder of its matches was awarded as 2–0 victories to its intended rivals.)	24	14	3	7	36	23	+13	45	
4	Maccabi Hadera	24	11	6	7	31	32	−1	39	
5	Maccabi Tur'an	24	11	7	6	35	27	+8	38 (Note: Two points deducted.)	
6	Hapoel Kiryat Shmona	24	8	10	6	31	25	+6	34	
7	Hapoel Lod	24	9	5	10	43	35	+8	29 (Note: The match between Hapoel Lod and Maccabi Afula was set as a 0–0 without points given.)	
8	Hapoel Hurfeish	24	8	3	13	34	44	−10	27	
9	Maccabi Shefa-'Amr	24	7	5	12	26	37	−11	26	
10	Hapoel Kafr Kanna	24	7	5	12	30	48	−18	26	
11	Hapoel Migdal HaEmek	24	7	2	15	21	42	−21	23	
12	Maccabi Isfiya	24	5	7	12	28	42	−14	22	
13	Maccabi Afula	24	3	3	18	20	50	−30	11	Relegated to Liga Bet

Source: rsssf.com
Notes:
- Hapoel Ashdod merged with Maccabi Ironi Ashdod to form F.C. Ashdod, leaving the division with 13 teams.

== South Division ==
Pos	Team	Pld	W	D	L	GF	GA	GD	Pts	Promotion or relegation
1	Maccabi Ashkelon	26	20	5	1	57	13	+44	65	Promoted to Liga Artzit
2	Hapoel Nir Ramat HaSharon	26	20	3	3	57	20	+37	63	Promoted to Liga Artzit
3	Hapoel Nahlat Yehuda	26	15	3	8	45	25	+20	48	
4	Maccabi Lazarus Holon	26	11	6	9	27	24	+3	39	Folded
5	A.S. Ramat Eliyahu	26	10	7	9	29	29	0	37	
6	Hapoel Kiryat Ono	26	9	9	8	26	29	−3	36	
7	Hapoel Mevaseret Zion	26	9	7	10	41	41	0	34	
8	Hapoel Kfar Shalem	26	9	6	11	30	33	−3	33	
9	Maccabi Jaffa	26	9	6	11	39	38	+1	32 (Note: The matches of Hapoel Or Yeuhda against Maccabi Jaffa and Hapoel Ihud Tzeirei Jaffa were set as 0–0 without points given.)	Merged with A.S. Ramat Eliyahu
10	Maccabi Ramat Amidar	26	9	5	12	34	34	0	32	
11	Hapoel Ihud Tzeirei Jaffa	26	9	6	11	24	31	−7	32	
12	Maccabi Yavne	26	8	5	13	20	40	−20	29	
13	Sektzia Nes Tziona	26	5	8	13	25	49	−24	23	
14	Hapoel Or Yehuda (Note: As Hapoel Or Yehuda folded at the beginning of the season, all of its matches, except for the matches against Maccabi Jaffa and Hapoel Ihud Tzeirei Jaffa (who, at the time, were themselves excluded of the league, before sorting their financial problems), were registered as a 0–2 forfeit.)	26	0	2	24	0	48	−48	2	Relegated to Liga Bet

Source: rsssf.com
