= Hapoel Ramot Menashe Megiddo F.C. =

Israeli football club

Hapoel Ramot Menashe Megiddo
- Full name: Hapoel Ramot Menashe Megiddo Football Club הפועל רמות מנשה מגידו
- Founded: 1971
- Ground: Ramot Menashe
- Chairman: Shlomo Liran
- Manager: Shlomo Liran
- League: Liga Bet North B
- 2024–25: Liga Bet North B, 11th
Home colours	Away colours

Hapoel Ramot Menashe Megiddo (Hebrew: הפועל רמות מנשה מגידו) is an Israeli football club representing Kibbutz Ramot Menashe and the Megiddo Regional Council. The club currently plays in Liga Bet North B division.

== History ==
The club was founded in 1971 and started playing in the regional leagues, which were not affiliated with the Israel Football Association and mostly involved football clubs from other kibbutzim. In 1995 the club joined the Israel Football Association and started at the Liga Gimel bay division. In the 1999–2000 season, the club finished runners-up in Liga Gimel Jezreel division and were promoted to Liga Bet for the first time in their history, after one spot was vacated in that league, following the merger between Hapoel Kiryat Shmona (played in Liga Alef) and Maccabi Kiryat Shmona (played in Liga Bet), which became Hapoel Ironi Kiryat Shmona.

The club relegated back to Liga Gimel after they finished bottom in Liga Bet North A division in the 2001–02 season and remained in Liga Gimel until the 2007–08 season, where they finished runners-up and were promoted to Liga Bet as the best runners-up in Liga Gimel North divisions, once again after one spot was vacated, this time after Maccabi Tur'an were folded.

In the 2009–10 season the club finished third in Liga Bet North B division and qualified for the promotion play-offs. After beating Maccabi Ahi Iksal, Hapoel Iksal and Hapoel Ihud Bnei Sumei, they faced Hapoel Bnei Jadeidi in the decisive promotion/relegation play-offs. Hapoel Ramot Menashe Megiddo won 3–2 after coming back from 0–2 and promoted to Liga Alef.

In the 2010–11 season, the club finished bottom in Liga Alef North and relegated back to Liga Bet, where they play today.

Hapoel Ramot Menashe Megiddo is currently the only football club representing the Kibbutz Movement.
