= 2002–03 Liga Artzit =

The 2002–03 Liga Artzit season saw Hakoah Ramat Gan win the title and promotion to Liga Leumit alongside runners-up Ironi Kiryat Shmona. Hapoel Kafr Sumei and Hapoel Bat Yam were relegated to Liga Alef.

== Final table ==
Pos	Team	Pld	W	D	L	GF	GA	GD	Pts	Promotion or relegation
1	Hakoah Ramat Gan	33	21	11	1	66	23	+43	74	Promoted to Liga Leumit
2	Ironi Kiryat Shmona	33	21	7	5	64	31	+33	70	Promoted to Liga Leumit
3	Maccabi Ramat Amidar	33	18	11	4	51	28	+23	65	
4	Hapoel Acre	33	16	10	7	51	37	+14	58	
5	Hapoel Majd al-Krum	33	12	7	14	49	51	−2	43	
6	Hapoel Ashkelon	33	10	10	13	33	42	−9	40	
7	Maccabi Ironi Kiryat Ata	33	11	6	16	47	50	−3	39	
8	Beitar Shimshon Tel Aviv	33	10	9	14	42	46	−4	39	
9	Hapoel Beit She'an	33	10	8	15	42	46	−4	38	
10	Ironi Nir Ramat HaSharon	33	8	9	16	27	46	−19	33	
11	Hapoel Kafr Sumei	33	8	3	22	34	70	−36	27	Relegated to Liga Alef
12	Hapoel Bat Yam	33	3	9	21	34	70	−36	18	Relegated to Liga Alef

Source: rsssf.com
