= Hapoel Rahat F.C. =

Israeli football club

Hapoel Rahat
- Full name: Hapoel Rahat Football Club הפועל רהט
- Founded: 1982
- Ground: Rahat Ground, Rahat
- Chairman: Salameh al-Kamalat
- Manager: Wahid al-Sana
- League: Liga Bet South B
- 2014–15: 12th
Home colours	Away colours

Hapoel Rahat (Hebrew: הפועל רהט, Arabic: هبوعيل رهط) is an Israeli football club based in the Bedouin city of Rahat. The club is currently in Liga Bet South B division.

== History ==
The club was founded in 1982 by Salameh al-Kamalat, and became the first club to represent the city of Rahat, after football in Rahat was previously represented by Hapoel al-Huzeil and Hapoel al-Ubra, which have represented their local tribes, rather than the city of Rahat. Hapoel Rahat started at Liga Dalet, then the sixth and lowest tier of Israeli football, where they played until the league was scrapped (in 1985), and as a result were promoted to Liga Gimel.

The club was promoted to Liga Bet (the fifth tier from 1999 to 2009) for the first time, after winning Liga Gimel South division in the 1999–2000 season. However, they were relegated back to Liga Gimel, after finished bottom of Liga Bet South B division in the following season. Although Hapoel Rahat made an immediate return to Liga Bet, they were relegated once more at the end of the 2002–03 season, this time after second bottom finish.

In the 2008–09 season, the club finished on top of Liga Gimel Central division, level on points with F.C. Kiryat Gat and Bnei Yeechalal Rehovot, and had to face both clubs in a three-way promotion play-off. Hapoel Rahat finished the play-off as runners-up, after F.C. Kiryat Gat, and were eventually promoted to Liga Bet after Hapoel Masos (which were relegated from Liga Alef South division), folded during the summer. Thus, the club jumped by two levels, as Liga Bet became the fourth tier of Israeli football, following the closure of Liga Artzit at the summer of 2009.

The club's best achievement to date came at the 2013–14 season, when they finished fifth in Liga Bet South B division and qualified for the Promotion play-offs, where they made a remarkable run, as without the home advantage, they eliminated the second placed, Maccabi Ironi Netivot, with a win on penalties after 1–1 draw in the first round, and in the second round, they eliminated the fourth placed, Ironi Modi'in, with a win of 1–0, and qualified for the regional final, where they lost 1–2 against the Liga Bet North A regional winners, Hapoel Hod HaSharon, in a match which was held in Ramat Gan Stadium.

== Honours ==
=== League ===
Honour	No.	Years
Sixth tier	1	1999–2000
