= Hapoel Bnei Maghar F.C. =

Hapoel Bnei Maghar
- Full name: Hapoel Bnei Maghar הפועל בני מג'אר
- Founded: 2008; 2022 (refounded)
- 2015–16: Liga Bet North A, – (folded)

Hapoel Bnei Maghar (Hebrew: הפועל בני מג'אר), also known as Ihud Bnei Magharr (Hebrew: איחוד בני מג'אר) or Hapoel Maghar was an Israeli football club which represented Maghar. The club dissolved in January 2016, resigning from the league due to financial difficulties and lack of sufficient football stadium in Maghar.

== History ==
The club was founded in 2008, replacing an older club, Hapoel Maghar, which folded in 2001. The club won Liga Gimel Upper Galilee division in 2011–12 and promoted to Liga Bet, finishing 8th in its first season, but falling to 13th and 15th in its next two seasons, participating in the relegation play-offs in each of the seasons, staying in the league with wins over Maccabi Tamra and Ahva Arraba.

The club started its fourth season in Liga Bet dismally, placing last. On 8 January 2016, the club's officials announced the club's resignation from the league, due to financial difficulties and lack of sufficient football stadium in Maghar.

== Honours ==
=== League ===
Honour	No.	Years
Fifth tier	1	2011–12
Sixth tier	1	1999–2000^{1}

=== Cups ===
Honour	No.	Years
Liga Gimel divisional State Cup	1	2011–12

^{1}As Hapoel Maghar
