= Hapoel Ironi Karmiel =

Israeli football club

Hapoel Karmiel
- Full name: Hapoel Karmiel הפועל כרמיאל
- Founded: 1960-2008,as Hapoel Karmiel; 2009-2016 as F.C. Karmiel Safed; 2019-Present as Hapoel Karmiel
- Ground: Municipal Stadium, Karmiel
- Capacity: 700
- Manager: Raffi Buskila
- League: Liga Bet North A
- 2024–25: Liga Bet North A, 3rd

Hapoel Karmiel (Hebrew: הפועל כרמיאל) is an Israeli football club which represents the city of Karmiel . The club currently plays in Liga Alef North division.

The club has good reputation of being the most Fair Play club in Liga Alef for five consecutive seasons, and as a result, won the right to represent Israel in the UEFA Regions' Cup for the third consecutive time.

== History ==
F.C. Karmiel Safed was formed in 2009 by a merger of Beitar Safed, which played in Liga Alef North division and Hapoel Karmiel, which played in Liga Bet North A division.

The best result of the club to date, was third-place finish in Liga Alef North at the 2013–14 season and qualification to the promotion play-offs, where they lost 0–2 in the first round to Hapoel Migdal HaEmek.

The club participated three times in the UEFA Regions' Cup. In the 2011 edition, they have reached the Intermediary round.

== Honours ==
=== League ===
Honour	No.	Years
Fourth tier	1	1962–63^{1}
Fifth tier	1	2005–06^{1}
Sixth tier	1	1999–2000^{1}

^{1}Achieved by Beitar Safed
