= Maccabi Ironi Shlomi F.C. =

Israeli football club

Maccabi Ironi Shlomi
- Full name: Maccabi Ironi Shlomi Football Club
- Founded: 1996
- Dissolved: 2009
- Owner: Shlomi Municipality
- League: Liga Alef
- 2008–09: 13th (relegated)

Maccabi Ironi Shlomi was an Israeli football club based in Ma'alot-Tarshiha.

== History ==
The club was founded in 1996 by initiative of the Channel 2 program "Katan Aleynu" (Hebrew: קטן עלינו), hosted by Avri Gilad; adopt a Liga Gimel club and follow its promotion to the top division. Under the program's guidance, the two existing Shlomi clubs, Beitar and Hapoel, both of which played in the bottom divisions throughout their existence, were merged to form the united club under the name Maccabi Ironi Shlomi.

By the end of the season, the club lost its promotion race, as it finished second behind Hapoel Kabul, and as the series concluded broadcast, the project was handed over to the municipality. The club promoted to Liga Bet in 1999, and won promotion in 2001 to Liga Alef. In 2003–04 the club finished 13th in the league, set to relegate to Liga Bet, but Maccabi Hadera folded.

At the end of the 2004–05 season the club merged with Ironi Nahariya from Liga Bet and continued to play under the name Maccabi Ironi Shlomi/Nahariya in Liga Alef. In June 2009, the club was involved in a match-fixing attempt and was relegated directly to Liga Gimel,; the club then folded.

== Honours ==
=== League ===
Honour	No.	Years
Fifth tier	2	1998–99, 2000–01
