= Ironi Ofakim F.C. =

Israeli football club

Ironi Ofakim
- Full name: Ironi Ofakim Football Club
- Founded: 1996
- Dissolved: 2008
- League: Liga Alef
- 2007–08: 14th (relegated)

Ironi Ofakim was an Israeli football club based in Ofakim.

== History ==
The club was founded before the 1996–97 season and was placed in Liga Bet, replacing Hapoel Ofakim. In 2001 the club won the South B division and was promoted to Liga Alef, then fourth tier. During that season the club also qualified to the 9th round of the State Cup, losing 2–7 to Maccabi Tel Aviv.

The club played in Liga Alef for the next seven seasons, finishing as runners-up in 2004–05. in 2007 the club was due to fold, as the city council withdrew its financial support of the club. However, the club continued operating for another season upon voluntary basis and at the end of the 2007–08 the club finished bottom of the league and folded.

== Honours ==
=== League ===
Honour	No.	Years
Fifth tier	1	2000–01
