= Maccabi Ironi Tirat HaCarmel F.C. =

Israeli football club

Maccabi Ironi Tirat HaCarmel
- Full name: Maccabi Ironi Tirat HaCarmel Football Club
- Founded: 1956; 1995; 2018
- Dissolved: 1962; 2016
- Ground: Tirat HaCarmel Stadium, Tirat Carmel
- Chairman: Eli Biton
- Manager: Avi Malka
- League: Liga Bet North B
- 2024–25: Liga Bet North B, 4th
Home colours	Away colours

Maccabi Ironi Tirat HaCarmel Football Club (Hebrew: מועדון כדורגל מכבי עירוני טירת הכרמל) is an Israeli football club based in Tirat Carmel. They are currently in Liga Gimel, the fifth tier.

== History ==
The club spent much of its early existence in Liga Gimel, the lowest level of Israeli football. In the 1990s they were promoted to Liga Bet, where they played Hapoel Tirat HaCarmel for the first time. Hapoel, for many years the city's main club, were later relegated to Liga Gimel and folded.

In 1999–2000 the club won the North B Division of Liga Bet and were promoted to Liga Alef. In 2003–04 they finished second in the North Division, missing out on promotion. However, champions Maccabi Hadera folded in the summer, and Maccabi Ironi Tirat HaCarmel were promoted to Liga Artzit in their place.

In the 2008–09 season they were relegated to Liga Alef, and in 2010 they were relegated to Liga Bet after finishing bottom of their division. Just two seasons later in 2012, they were relegated to Liga Gimel, the lowest tier of Israeli football. In 2013 the club was named after Staff Sergeant Gal (Gabriel) Kobi, who was killed in Hebron. The club ceased operations in 2016. Another club, F.C. Tirat Carmel, which was also named after Gal Kobi was founded in 2018.

== Honours ==
- Liga Bet
  - North B Division champions:
    - 1999–2000
