= Ironi Sayid Umm al-Fahm F.C. =

- Full name: Ironi Sayid Umm al-Fahm Football Club
- Founded: 1993
- Dissolved: 2011
- Ground: HaShalom Stadium
- Capacity: 12,000
- League: Liga Alef North division
- 2010–11: 14th

Ironi Sayid Umm al-Fahm Football Club (Hebrew: עירוני סעיד אום אל-פאחם), also known as F.C. Umm al-Fahm (Hebrew: מועדון ספורט אום אל-פאחם), was an Arab-Israeli football club based in Umm al-Fahm.

== History ==
The club was established in 1993 following a merger between the Umm al-Fahm clubs of Shimshon and Al-Ahli (no relation to Maccabi Ironi Jatt Al-Ahli). The club played in Liga Bet, which was the fifth tier in the Israeli football league system at the time, until it won its division in 2006–07 and was promoted to fourth tier Liga Alef.

In 2009, after Hapoel Umm al-Fahm folded, an informal union was formed between the managements of Hapoel and Ironi Sayid, in order to keep the name of Hapoel active. However, the merger was not confirmed by the IFA, and the team changed its official name to F.C. Umm al-Fahm, while it was informally called "Hapoel Baladi".

At the beginning of the 2009–10 season, Liga Alef became third tier after the abolishment of Liga Artzit, and the club competed for promotion to Liga Leumit. At the end of the season, the club topped its division, but was deducted six points after it was convicted in attempted match fixing, as one of its players contacted a player from local rivals Maccabi Ironi Jatt, who were also aiming for promotion, and offered him several benefits in exchange for throwing the match between the teams. As the club lost the six points, it placed second and played in the Liga Alef promotion play-offs, losing to Maccabi HaShikma Ramat Hen in the first round.

The following season, the club finished in 14th place, which meant it had to play a relegation/promotion play-off match against a club from Liga Bet. In the match, against F.C. Givat Olga, the club lost 2–3 and relegated to Liga Bet. Over the summer the club folded, and a new team, Ahva Umm al-Fahm, was established instead, with two of Ironi Sayid's board members joining the new club's management. In 2013, Ahva Umm al-Fahm changed its name to Hapoel Umm al-Fahm.

== Honours ==
- Liga Bet (fifth tier):
  - 2006–07
