= Ihud Bnei Majd al-Krum F.C. =

Israeli football club

Ihud Bnei Majd al-Krum
- Full name: Ihud Bnei Majd al-Krum Football Club
- Founded: 2008
- Ground: Majd al-Krum Ground, Majd al-Krum
- Owner: (Israel) Hisham Razzaq
- Chairman: (Israel) Saeed Maqbool
- Manager: (Israel) Karim Hatem
- League: Liga Bet North A
- 2023–24: Liga Alef North, 9th (relegated)
Home colours	Away colours

Ihud Bnei Majd al-Krum (Hebrew: איחוד בני מג'ד אל כרום) is an Israeli football club based in Majd al-Krum. They are currently in Liga Alef North division. The club is part of Hapoel Association.

== History ==
The club was founded in 2008, in order to revive football in Majd al-Krum, after Hapoel Majd al-Krum folded, following their relegation from Liga Artzit, the third tier of Israeli football at the time, in the 2004–05 season.

In their first season of existence, the club won first place Liga Gimel Upper Galilee , and were promoted to Liga Bet.

In the 2013–14 season, the club won Liga Bet North A division. However, as they finished equal on points with runners-up, Hapoel Kafr Kanna, a decisive match for promotion was held, which ended in 1–1 draw after extra time, and eventually in a 4–3 win on penalties for Ihud Bnei Majd al-Krum, which were promoted to Liga Alef.

== Honours ==
=== League ===
Honour	No.	Years
Fourth tier	3	1996–97^{1}, 1999–2000^{1}, 2013–14
Sixth tier	1	2008–09

=== Cups ===
Honour	No.	Years
Liga Gimel divisional State Cup	1	2008–09

^{1} as Hapoel Majd al-Krum
