= Hapoel Mevaseret Zion F.C. =

Israeli football club

Hapoel Mevaseret Zion
- Full name: Hapoel Mevaseret Zion Football Club הפועל מבשרת ציון
- Founded: 1966
- Ground: HaMigrash HaYarok, Mevaseret Zion
- Capacity: 200
- Chairman: Doron Ben Shimon
- Manager: Andrey Andonov
- League: Liga Gimel Central
- 2015–16: 8th
Home colours	Away colours

Hapoel Mevaseret Zion (Hebrew: הפועל מבשרת ציון) is an Israeli football club based in Mevaseret Zion. The club is currently in Liga Gimel Central division.

== History ==
The club was founded in 1966 and played mostly in the lower divisions of Israeli football. Mevaseret reached Liga Bet for the first time in the 1981–82 season, in which they were punished with suspension of activity and demoted back to Liga Gimel. After several years between Liga Gimel and Liga Bet, the club reached Liga Alef for the first time in their history in 1998–99, the first out of two seasons in which the club played in the third tier of Israeli football, as following the creation of the Israeli Premier League in the following season, Liga Alef became the fourth tier, up until 2009, when Liga Artzit (then the third tier) was closed, and Liga Alef regained its status as the third tier.

Prior to the 2004–05 season, the club became Hapoel Mevaseret Zion/Abu Ghosh, following a merger with Ironi Abu Ghosh, and became the first Israeli team mixed from an Arab village and a Jewish town.

Prior to the 2007–08 season, disenchanted fans of Hapoel Jerusalem, extremely dissatisfied with the management, resolved to create a company with the aim of purchasing Hapoel Jerusalem. When it became evident that reaching such a deal was impossible, they joined forces with Hapoel Mevaseret Zion/Abu Ghosh and became known as Hapoel Katamon/Mevaseret Zion. The merged club failed to achieve promotion to Liga Artzit, after they finished runners-up in Liga Alef South division, one point behind champions, Ironi Bat Yam. The following season was less successful, as the club finished in the seventh place. The merger between Mevaseret and Katamon came apart at the end of the season. Hapoel Mevaseret Zion continued in Liga Alef, whilst Hapoel Katamon Jerusalem were registered in Liga Gimel as a new club.

In 2009–10, the season in which Liga Alef regained its status as the third tier of Israeli football, Hapoel Mevaseret Zion, now as a separate entity, finished in the bottom place and relegated to Liga Bet. In the following season, the club narrowly avoided relegation to Liga Gimel, after they finished bottom in Liga Bet South B division and earned a place in the Relegation play-offs due to the dismissal of Ironi Ramla from the league. Mevaseret beat F.C. Dimona 1–0 in the first round of Liga Bet South B Relegation play-offs and remained in Liga Bet. However, in the following season, they finished once more in the bottom place and were relegated to Liga Gimel, the fifth and lowest tier of Israeli football, where they play today.

== Honours ==
=== League ===
Honour	No.	Years
Fifth tier	1	1985–86
