= Hapoel Segev Shalom F.C. =

Israeli football club

Hapoel Segev Shalom
- Full name: Hapoel Segev Shalom Football Club הפועל שגב שלום
- Founded: 1994; 2018
- Manager: Moti Atar
- League: Liga Bet South B
- 2024–25: Liga Bet South B, 2nd
Home colours	Away colours

Hapoel Segev Shalom (Hebrew: הפועל משוש/שגב שלום), also call Hapoel Shaqib al-Salam, is an Israeli football club based in Shaqib al-Salam (Segev Shalom).

== History ==
The club was founded in 1994 as teams from Shaqib al-Salam and nearby Masos Regional Council were merged. In 1998 the club was promoted to Liga Bet, and finished in third place for three straight seasons, narrowly missing on promotion in 2001. At the end of the 2003–04 the club withdrew from the league and re-registered to play in Liga Gimel. The club won its division in its first season in the bottom tier and was promoted back to Liga Bet, finishing as runners-up and qualifying to promotion play-offs in 2006–07, in which the club played against Beitar Kfar Saba and Hapoel Tzafririm Holon, eventually staying in Liga Bet. A season later, the club won its division and was promoted to Liga Alef, becoming the first Bedouin team to do so. However, after one season in Liga Alef, the club folded due to financial difficulties and withdrew from the league.

The club's best achievement in the State Cup came in 2001–02, when the club qualified to eighth round, losing to Maccabi Netanya.

== Honours ==
=== League ===
Honour	No.	Years
Fifth tier	2	1997–98, 2007–08
Sixth tier	1	2004–05
