= Beitar Kiryat Gat F.C. =

Israeli football club

Beitar Kiryat Gat
- Full name: Beitar Ironi Kiryat Gat Football Club בית״ר עירוני קריית גת
- Nickname: The Blues
- Founded: 1970; 2016 (Re-established)
- Dissolved: 2006
- Ground: Municipal Stadium, Kiryat Gat
- Capacity: 3,500
- Chairman: Liron Moas
- Manager: Asher Alfasi
- League: Liga Bet South B
- 2024–25: Liga Bet South B, 10th
Home colours	Away colours

Beitar Ironi Kiryat Gat (Hebrew: בית״ר עירוני קריית גת) is an Israeli football club based in Kiryat Gat. The club currently plays in Liga Bet South division.

== History ==
The club was founded in 1970 and joined the Beitar sport association. The club started playing in Liga Dalet (Gezer District). In the 1981/1982 season the team promoted to Liga Bet. and drop out after 3 seasons. In the 1986/1987 season the team promoted again to Liga Bet. and drop out after 2 seasons.

In the 1999/2000, The team promoted two leagues in two years, and reached to Liga Alef. Over the years, The highest place that the club had reached is the sixth place Liga Alef (The Third Division).

Until 2006 there were in Kiryat Gat two football clubs: Maccabi Kiryat Gat F.C., and Beitar Kiryat Gat which played in Liga Alef. After this season, The club merged with Maccabi and Disassembled.

=== Re-established ===
In September 2016, the club Re-established. and participate in Liga Gimel South division. In the 2016/2017 season, the club finished in the second place, and stayed in Liga Gimel. A year later, the club won the Liga Gimel South and was promoted to Liga Bet.
