= Maccabi Tzur Shalom F.C. =

Israeli football club

Maccabi Tzur Shalom
- Full name: Maccabi Tzur Shalom Football Club מכבי צור שלום
- Founded: 1972; 54 years ago
- Ground: Tzur Shalom field, Kiryat Bialik
- Capacity: 2,000
- Chairman: (Israel) Tom Azriel
- Manager: (Israel) Ya'akov Danino
Home colours	Away colours

Maccabi Tzur Shalom (Hebrew: מכבי צור שלום) is an Israeli football club based in the Tzur Shalom neighbourhood of Kiryat Bialik. The club plays in Liga Alef North, and played home matches at the Tzur Shalom Stadium in Kiryat Bialik.

== History ==
The club played mostly in the lower divisions of Israeli football. However, they started a period of success after they won Liga Gimel Haifa division in the 1999–2000 season, and were promoted to Liga Bet. Two seasons later, in the 2001–02 season, they won Liga Bet North B division, and were promoted to Liga Alef, and three seasons later, in the 2004–05 season, they won Liga Alef North, and were promoted to Liga Artzit, the third tier of Israeli football at the time. However, their spell in Liga Artzit lasted one season, as they finished second bottom at the 2005–06 season with 7 wins out of 33 matches, and were relegated back to Liga Alef (now as third tier, following the closure of Liga Artzit in 2009), where they last played.

The club represented Israel at the 2009 UEFA Regions' Cup.

On 27 July 2020, they merged with Maccabi Ironi Kiryat Ata.

== Honours ==
- Liga Alef North
  - 2004–05
- Liga Bet North B
  - 2001–02
- Liga Gimel Haifa
  - 1984–85, 1999–00
