= Hapoel Nahlat Yehuda F.C. =

Israeli football club

Hapoel Nahlat Yehuda
- Full name: Hapoel Nahlat Yehuda Rishon LeZion Football Club הפועל נחלת יהודה ראשון לציון
- Founded: 1976
- Ground: Nahlat Yehuda Stadium, Rishon LeZion
- Capacity: 450
- Chairman: Nissim Levi
- Manager: Dudi Bahar
- League: Liga Bet South A
- 2014–15: 7th
| Home colours | Away colours |

Hapoel Nahlat Yehuda (Hebrew: הפועל נחלת יהודה) is an Israeli football club based in the Nahlat Yehuda neighbourhood of Rishon LeZion. The club currently plays in Liga Bet South A division.

== History ==
The club was founded in 1976, and played in the lower divisions of Israeli football until the 1990s, when the club reached Liga Alef, the third tier of Israeli football.

Following the creation of the Israeli Premier League in 1999, Liga Alef was the fourth tier, up until 2009, when Liga Artzit (then the third tier) was closed, and Liga Alef regained its status as the third tier. the closest the club came to achieve promotion to Liga Artzit, was in the 2006–07 season, when they finished third in Liga Alef South division, one point behind Hapoel Kfar Shalem, which were eventually promoted, as the league winners, Hapoel Maxim Lod, were folded.

The club played in Liga Alef until the 2010–11 season, when they finished third bottom, and relegated to Liga Bet, following a defeat of 0–3 to F.C. Ortodoxim Lod in the Relegation play-offs.

== Honours ==
=== League ===
| Honour | No. | Years |
|---|---|---|
| Fourth tier | 1 | 1996–97 |
| Fifth tier | 1 | 1986–87 |

=== Cups ===
| Honour | No. | Years |
|---|---|---|
| Liga Bet South A Division Cup | 1 | 2014–15 |
