= Hapoel Ihud Bnei Sumei F.C. =

Israeli football club

Hapoel Ihud Bnei Sumei
- Full name: Hapoel Ihud Bnei Sumei Football Club הפועל איחוד בני סמיע
- Founded: 1971 as Hapoel Kafr Sumei; 2010 as Hapoel Ihud Bnei Sumei
- Ground: Kafr Sumei Ground, Kisra-Sumei
- Chairman: Naji Rabbah
- Manager: Naim Rabbah
- League: Liga Bet North A
- 2015–16: 8th
Home colours	Away colours

Hapoel Ihud Bnei Sumei (Hebrew: הפועל איחוד בני סמיע) is an Israeli football club based in Kisra-Sumei. The club is currently in Liga Bet North A division.

== History ==
The club was founded in 1971 as Hapoel Kafr Sumei and played mostly in the lower divisions of Israeli football. In the early 2000s, they started a period of success after they finished runners-up in Liga Bet North A division at the 1999–2000 season and were promoted to Liga Alef as the best runners-up in Liga Bet North divisions. two seasons later, at the 2001–02 season, they won Liga Alef North division and were promoted to Liga Artzit, the third tier of Israeli football at the time. However, their spell in Liga Artzit lasted one season, as they finished second bottom at the 2002–03 season and relegated back to Liga Alef. The club dropped to Liga Bet at the end of the 2006–07 season, after falling in the Relegation play-offs to Ironi Tiberias, which were promoted to Liga Alef.

In 2010, Hapoel merged with Maccabi Kafr Sumei (which was founded in the early 1990s) to create Hapoel Ihud Bnei Sumei. Since the merger agreement was reached after the deadline in which merger requests may be submitted to the Israel Football Association, the merged club continued to play under Hapoel, whilst Maccabi was handed to the management of Liga Gimel club, Bnei Nahf, and eventually withdrew from the league during the season. Hapoel Ihud Bnei Sumei finished the 2010–11 season in Liga Bet North A as runners-up and qualified for the Promotion play-offs, where they lost in the first round to Ironi Bnei Kabul.

== Honours ==
=== League ===
Honour	No.	Years
Fourth tier	1	2001–02^{1}
Fifth tier	1	1981–82^{1}

^{1}Achieved by Hapoel Kafr Sumei
