= 2022–23 Israel State Cup =

Tournament details
- Country: Israel

Final positions
- Champions: Beitar Jerusalem
- Runners-up: Maccabi Netanya

Tournament statistics
- Matches played: 137
- Goals scored: 515 (3.76 per match)

The 2022–23 Israel State Cup (Hebrew: גביע המדינה, Gvia HaMedina) was the 84th season of Israel's nationwide Association football cup competition and the 68th after the Israeli Declaration of Independence.

== Preliminary rounds ==
=== Liga Bet ===
- Schedule:
- Results:

==== Liga Bet North A ====
First round
30 August 2022, 20:00
Ahi Acre	2
Tzeirei Tamra	3
30 August 2022, 19:45
Hapoel Karmiel	2
S.C. Shefa-'Amr	1
30 August 2022, 17:00
Beitar Nahariya
F.C. Haifa	Bye
31 August 2022, 16:00
Ahva Kafr Manda (a.e.t.)	3
Maccabi Ironi Yaffa	2
30 August 2022
Ironi Bnei Kabul
Bnei Judaydah-Makr	Bye

Second round
2 September 2022
Tzeirei Tamra
Hapoel Karmiel	Bye
2 September 2022, 14:30
Hapoel Ironi Safed	0
F.C. Bnei M.M.B.E.	1
5 September 2021, 19:30
F.C. Haifa	1
F.C. Kiryat Yam	10
3 September 2022, 16:00
Ahva Kafr Manda	3
Bnei Judaydah-Makr	4

Third round
5 September 2022, 18:30
Hapoel Karmiel	2
F.C. Bnei M.M.B.E.	0
13 September 2022, 20:45
F.C. Kiryat Yam	0 (4)
Bnei Judaydah-Makr (p)	0 (5)

Fourth round
13 December 2022
Hapoel Karmiel	5
Bnei Judaydah-Makr	3

==== Liga Bet North B ====
First round
30 August 2022, 13:40
Ihud Bnei Baqa	0
Ihud Bnei Kafr Qara	4
31 August 2022, 14:30
Hapoel Bnei Ar'ara 'Ara	0
Hapoel Bnei Musmus	2
30 August 2022, 18:45
Beitar Haifa	1
Maccabi Achva Fureidis	4
30 August 2022, 17:30
Hapoel Beit She'an Masilot	7
Hapoel Sandala Gilboa	1
30 August 2022, 16:00
F.C. Pardes Hanna-Karkur
Achva Reina	Bye

Second round
Maccabi Ahi Iksal
Ihud Bnei Kafr Qara	Bye
3 September 2022, 16:00
Hapoel Bnei Musmus	1
Tzeirei Umm al-Fahm	0
2 September 2022, 14:15
Maccabi Neve Sha'anan Eldad	2
Maccabi Achva Fureidis	1
13 September 2022, 18:00
Hapoel Beit She'an Masilot	1
Achva Reina (a.e.t.)	2

Third round
6 September 2022, 16:00
Ihud Bnei Kafr Qara (a.e.t.)	2
Hapoel Bnei Musmus	1
16 September 2022, 13:30
Maccabi Neve Sha'anan Eldad	2
Achva Reina	1

Fourth round
3 December 2022
Ihud Bnei Kafr Qara	5
Maccabi Neve Sha'anan Eldad	0

==== Liga Bet South A ====
First round
30 August 2022, 15:30
Hapoel Mahane Yehuda	0
Tzeirei Tira	1
30 August 2022, 16:00
Ironi Beit Dagan	1
Hapoel Azor	3
30 August 2022, 16:00
Hapoel Hod HaSharon
Hapoel Kafr Qasim Shouaa	Bye
30 August 2022, 20:30
HaMakhtesh Givatayim	4
F.C. Bnei Jaffa Ortodoxim	0
30 August 2022, 20:15
Maccabi Amishav Petah Tikva	4
Hakoah Amidar Ramat Gan	1
30 August 2022, 19:45
Hapoel Ramat Israel	2
Hapoel Kiryat Ono	1
30 August 2022, 17:00
Beitar Ramat Gan	5
Hapoel Ganei Tikva	1
30 August 2022, 19:45
F.C Hapoel Lod	5
Beitar Petah Tikva	1

Second round
2 September 2022, 11:00
Tzeirei Tira	1
Hapoel Azor	2
6 September 2022, 18:00
Hapoel Kafr Qasim Shouaa	1
HaMakhtesh Givatayim	2
2 September 2022, 15:30
Maccabi Amishav Petah Tikva	3
Hapoel Ramat Israel	0
2 September 2022, 16:00
Beitar Ramat Gan	0
F.C Hapoel Lod	1(a.e.t.)

Third round
13 September 2022, 14:00
Hapoel Azor	4
HaMakhtesh Givatayim	2
5 September 2022, 20:15
Maccabi Amishav Petah Tikva	0
F.C Hapoel Lod	4

Fourth round
4 December 2022, 20:45
Hapoel Azor	6
F.C Hapoel Lod	1

==== Liga Bet South B ====
First round
30 August 2022, 15:45
A.S. Nordia Jerusalem	3
Hapoel Bnei Ashdod	1
30 August 2022, 16:00
Maccabi Ironi Netivot	2
Maccabi Ramla	1
30 August 2022, 16:00
Maccabi Kiryat Malakhi	4
Hapoel Gedera	2
30 August 2022, 18:15
F.C. Jerusalem	6
Hapoel Bnei Lod	2

Second round
2 September 2022, 13:30
A.S. Nordia Jerusalem	4(a.e.t.)
Maccabi Ironi Sderot	1
2 September 2022, 13:00
F.C. Shikun HaMizrah	2
Maccabi Be'er Sheva	1
2 September 2022, 13:30
Hapoel Yeruham	1
Maccabi Ironi Netivot	0
2 September 2022, 14:00
Maccabi Kiryat Malakhi	3
F.C. Jerusalem	0

Third round
6 September 2022, 16:15
A.S. Nordia Jerusalem	4(a.e.t.)
F.C. Shikun HaMizrah	0
6 September 2022, 16:00
Maccabi Kiryat Malakhi	4(a.e.t.)
Hapoel Yeruham	1

Fourth round
13 September 2022, 20:00
A.S. Nordia Jerusalem	1
Maccabi Kiryat Malakhi	0

- The Winner and the Runners-up from each regional divisions qualified to the sixth round .

=== Liga Gimel ===
Sources:

- Schedule:
- Results:

==== Liga Gimel Upper Galilee ====
Third round
10 September 2022, 21:00
Bnei Maghar	1
F.C. Beit Jann	0
9 September 2022, 14:30
Maccabi Bnei Abu Snan	6
Hapoel Shlomi	1

Fourth round
17 September 2022, 14:30
Bnei Maghar	0
Maccabi Bnei Abu Snan	4

==== Liga Gimel Lower Galilee ====
Second round
6 September 2022, 16:05
Tzeirei Kafr Manda	3
Hapoel Ironi I'billin	0

Third round
10 September 2022, 16:00
Tzeirei Kafr Manda	0
Maccabi Basmat Tab'un	3
9 September 2022, 11:00
Beitar Kafr Kanna	5
Beitar Kiryat Ata	1

Fourth round
17 September 2022, 17:00
Maccabi Basmat Tab'un	1
Beitar Kafr Kanna	3

==== Liga Gimel Jezreel ====
First round
2 September 2022, 14:30
F.C. Kfar Kama	4(a.e.t.)
Hapoel Reineh	3
3 September 2022, 16:00
Hapoel Tzeirei Nazareth	3
Hapoel Ein as-Sahala	1

Second round
6 September 2022, 16:00
F.C. Kfar Kama	3
Hapoel Daliyat al-Karmel	4
6 September 2022, 16:15
Hapoel Tzeirei Nazareth	0
Hapoel Yafa	2
5 September 2022, 16:00
Hapoel Ramot Menashe Megiddo	1
Ihud Tzeirei Iksal	2
Maccabi Barta'a	Bye
F.C. Mashhad

Third round
10 September 2022, 14:00
Hapoel Daliyat al-Karmel	3
Hapoel Yafa	1
10 September 2022, 16:00
Ihud Tzeirei Iksal (p)	2(4)
Maccabi Barta'a	2(2)

Fourth round
17 September 2022, 16:00
Hapoel Daliyat al-Karmel	2
Ihud Tzeirei Iksal	4

==== Liga Gimel Samaria ====
Second round
6 September 2022, 20:00
Hapoel Ihud Bnei Jatt	7
F.C. Kiryat Haim	2
6 September 2022, 16:00
Maccabi Isfiya	7
Carmel Haifa	0
6 September 2022, 19:00
Hapoel Kiryat Yam	1
F.C. Tzofi Haifa	3(a.e.t.)

Third round
9 September 2022, 16:00
Hapoel Ihud Bnei Jatt	3
Maccabi Isfiya	1
9 September 2022, 13:00
Tzeirei Haifa	1
F.C. Tzofi Haifa	3

Fourth round
17 September 2022, 19:00
Hapoel Ihud Bnei Jatt	1
F.C. Tzofi Haifa	2

==== Liga Gimel Sharon ====
First round
3 September 2022, 21:00
Maccabi Ha'Sharon Netanya	2
Maccabi Ironi Kfar Yona	1
2 September 2022, 11:30
Bnei Herzliya	3
Maccabi Yehud-Monosson	2
1 September 2022, 19:30
Beitar Kfar Saba	2
Maccabi Giv'at Shmuel	0
2 September 2022, 11:00
Ironi Ariel	10
Beitar Tubruk	1
31 August 2022, 20:15
Bnei Ra'anana	3
Hapoel Pardesiya	2
3 September 2022, 21:30
AS Sporting Club Tel Aviv	9
F.C. Tel Aviv Tommy	1
2 September 2022, 15:30
Hapoel Oranit (p)	0(3)
F.C. Netanya	0(2)

Second round
6 September 2022, 20:45
Maccabi Ha'Sharon Netanya(a.e.t.)	2
Bnei Herzliya	1
6 September 2022, 19:00
Beitar Kfar Saba	3
Ironi Ariel	0
7 September 2022, 20:15
Bnei Ra'anana	3
AS Sporting Club Tel Aviv	0
6 September 2022, 16:00
Shimshon Bnei Tayibe	3
Hapoel Oranit	0

Third round
10 September 2022, 21:15
Maccabi Ha'Sharon Netanya	1
Beitar Kfar Saba	2
10 September 2022, 20:45
Bnei Ra'anana	4
Shimshon Bnei Tayibe	1

Fourth round
15 September 2022, 19:00
Beitar Kfar Saba (a.e.t.)	3
Bnei Ra'anana	1

==== Liga Gimel Central ====
First round
2 September 2022, 16:00
Tzeirei Lod	1
Hapoel Ramla	0

Second round
6 September 2022, 16:00
F.C. Beitar Yavne	1
Beitar Gedera	0
6 September 2022, 20:00
F.C. Be'er Ya'akov Solomon	2
Tzeirei Lod	0
6 September 2022, 16:00
F.C. Ramla	8
F.C. Ashdod City	3

Third round
9 September 2022, 16:45
F.C. Beitar Yavne	4
Beitar Gan Yavne	1
9 September 2022, 11:00
F.C. Be'er Ya'akov Solomon	2
F.C. Ramla	4

Fourth round
16 September 2022, 11:00
F.C. Beitar Yavne	3
F.C. Ramla	1

==== Liga Gimel Tel Aviv ====
First round
2 September 2022, 14:00
Bnei Yehud	1
F.C. Roei Heshbon Tel Aviv (a.e.t.)	2
2 September 2022, 11:00
Hakoah Galei Gil Ramat Gan	0
F.C. Elitzur Yutal Yehud	3
2 September 2022, 12:30
Elitzur Jaffa Tel Aviv	3
Shikun Vatikim Ramat Gan	7
1 September 2022, 19:00
Otzma Holon	3
Maccabi Spartak Ramat Gan	0
2 September 2022, 13:30
Hapoel Tzafririm Holon	0
Beitar Ezra	1

Second round
6 September 2022, 20:00
F.C. Roei Heshbon Tel Aviv	4
F.C. Elitzur Yutal Yehud	1
5 September 2022, 20:45
Shikun Vatikim Ramat Gan	3
Otzma Holon	2
6 September 2022, 20:30
Maccabi HaShikma Hen	6
Inter Aliyah Tel Aviv	1
6 September 2022, 18:00
Maccabi Or Yehuda	0
Beitar Ezra	7

Third round
12 September 2022, 20:30
F.C. Roei Heshbon Tel Aviv	1
Shikun Vatikim Ramat Gan	3
9 September 2022, 11:00
Maccabi HaShikma Hen	2
Beitar Ezra	1

Fourth round
17 September 2022, 20:30
Shikun Vatikim Ramat Gan	2
Maccabi HaShikma Hen	0

==== Liga Gimel South ====
First round
1 September 2022, 20:30
Maccabi Kiryat Gat	1
Hapoel Ashkelon Shimshon	0
2 September 2022, 13:00
F.C. Be'er Sheva Haim Levy	1
F.C. Meitar	0
2 September 2022, 14:30
Hapoel Ar'arat an-Naqab	3
Bnei Yerucham	1
3 September 2022, 15:00
Hapoel Rahat	4
Hapoel Bnei Kuseife	3
2 September 2022, 13:30
Ironi Beit Shemesh
Otzma Be'er Sheva	Bye

Second round
6 September 2022, 20:15
Maccabi Kiryat Gat	2
F.C. Be'er Sheva	1
6 September 2022, 16:00
F.C. Rahat	3
F.C. Be'er Sheva Haim Levy	1
6 September 2022, 20:00
Hapoel Ar'arat an-Naqab	2
Hapoel Rahat	0
Otzma Be'er Sheva	Bye
F.C. Maccabi Ashkelon

Third round
11 September 2022, 20:00
Maccabi Kiryat Gat	3
F.C. Rahat	0
10 September 2022, 21:15
Hapoel Ar'arat an-Naqab	1
Otzma Be'er Sheva	3

Fourth round
15 September 2022, 20:00
Maccabi Kiryat Gat	1
Otzma Be'er Sheva	0

- The Winner from each regional division qualified to the sixth round .

== Fifth round ==
The fifth Round is played within each division of Liga Alef. The winners qualify to the sixth Round

Home team	Score	Away team
Liga Alef North 3 September 2022
Ihud Bnei Shefa-'Amr	2–1	Hapoel Migdal HaEmek
F.C. Tira	2–1	Hapoel Kafr Kanna
Ironi Nesher	2–3 (a.e.t.)	F.C. Tzeirei Kafr Kanna
Maccabi Ata Bialik/Tzur Shalom	3–3 (3–5 p)	Hapoel Qalansawe
Hapoel Ra'anana	2–1	F.C. Tzeirei Tayibe
Maccabi Tamra	0–1	Maccabi Nujeidat
Hapoel Bu'eine	3–1 (a.e.t.)	Hapoel Ironi Baqa al-Gharbiyye
Hapoel Kaukab	1–1 (1–3 p)	Hapoel Bnei Zalafa
Liga Alef South
Hapoel Herzliya	3–1 (a.e.t.)	Shimshon Tel Aviv
Maccabi Sha'arayim	3–2	Maccabi Ironi Ashdod
Hapoel Marmorek	2–0	Beitar Tel Aviv Bat Yam
F.C. Dimona	5–1	F.C. Ironi Kuseife
Maccabi Yavne	2–0	Shimshon Kafr Qasim
Hapoel Kfar Shalem	0–2	F.C. Holon Yermiyahu
Bnei Eilat	3–2	Maccabi Herzliya
Ironi Modi'in	0–1	Hapoel Bik'at HaYarden

== Sixth round ==
The Sixth Round is played in two District area (North and South) within the team are qualify from the Preliminary and the fifth Round.

Home team	Score	Away team
19 September 2022
Hapoel Bu'eine (3)	3–1	Hapoel Ra'anana (3)
20 September 2022
Hapoel Bik'at HaYarden (3)	3–2	Maccabi Kiryat Malakhi (4)
Ihud Bnei Shefa-'Amr (3)	3–1	Ihud Bnei Kafr Qara (4)
Maccabi Sha'arayim (3)	1–0	Hapoel Lod (4)
F.C. Tzeirei Kafr Kanna (3)	2–1	Hapoel Karmiel (4)
Bnei Judaydah-Makr (4)	2–2 (5–4 p)	Maccabi Nujeidat (3)
Ihud Tzeirei Iksal (5)	1–3	Hapoel Bnei Zalafa (3)
A.S. Nordia Jerusalem (4)	0–2	F.C. Dimona (3)
Maccabi Yavne (3)	1–3	Hapoel Marmorek (3)
Beitar Kfar Saba (5)	1–2	Hapoel Azor (4)
F.C. Tzofi Haifa (5)	1–0	Maccabi Neve Sha'anan (4)
Shikun Vatikim Ramat Gan (5)	0–5	F.C. Holon Yermiyahu (3)
Maccabi Kiryat Gat (5)	1–3	Hapoel Herzliya (3)
F.C. Tira (3)	6–1	Maccabi Bnei Abu Snan (5)
21 September 2022
Hapoel Qalansawe (3)	6–0	Beitar Kafr Kanna (5)
11 October 2022
Bnei Eilat (3)	4–0	Beitar Yavne F.C. (5)

== Seventh round ==
In the Seventh Round played the 16 teams are qualify from the sixth and 12 teams from second division (Hapoel Petah Tikva, Hapoel Acre, Hapoel Umm al-Fahm and Hapoel Nir Ramat HaSharon) were pre-qualified for the Next Round.

Home team	Score	Away team
18 October 2022
Hapoel Bik'at HaYarden (3)	0–1	Ironi Tiberias (2)
F.C. Tzeirei Kafr Kanna (3)	0–1 (a.e.t.)	F.C. Kafr Qasim (2)
Bnei Judaydah-Makr (4)	0–3	F.C. Holon Yermiyahu (3)
Hapoel Bu'eine (3)	0–2	F.C. Tzofi Haifa (5)
Maccabi Sha'arayim (3)	0–1	Hapoel Qalansawe (3)
Hapoel Kfar Saba (2)	4–1	Bnei Eilat (3)
Hapoel Ramat Gan (2)	0–3	Maccabi Petah Tikva (2)
F.C. Dimona (3)	0–2 (a.e.t.)	Hapoel Afula (2)
Hapoel Rishon LeZion (2)	3–0	Hapoel Herzliya (3)
Maccabi Ahi Nazareth (2)	1–0	Hapoel Azor (4)
Hapoel Nof HaGalil (2)	2–0	Hapoel Marmorek (3)
19 October 2022
Ihud Bnei Shefa-'Amr (3)	2–1	Bnei Yehuda Tel Aviv (2)
Hapoel Bnei Zalafa (3)	0–1	A.S. Ashdod (2)
Maccabi K. Jaffa (2)	2–2 (a.e.t.) (2–3 p)	F.C. Tira (3)

== Eight round ==
Home team	Score	Away team
Sunday 11 December 2022
Beitar Jerusalem (1)	4–0	F.C. Kafr Qasim (2)
A.S. Ashdod (2)	1–2	Ironi Tiberias (2)
Hapoel Hadera (1)	1–3	Hapoel Kfar Saba (2)
Ironi Kiryat Shmona (1)	1–1 (a.e.t.) (3–4 p)	Maccabi Netanya (1)
Hapoel Umm al-Fahm (2)	2–3	Maccabi Tel Aviv (1)
Monday 12 December 2022
Hapoel Qalansawe (3)	0–3	Bnei Sakhnin (1)
Ihud Bnei Shefa-'Amr (3)	4–4 (a.e.t.) (2–4 p)	Hapoel Haifa (1)
F.C. Tira (3)	2–3 (a.e.t.)	Hapoel Petah Tikva (2)
FC Ashdod (1)	2–1	Hapoel Beer Sheva (1)
Hapoel Ironi Akko (2)	2–3	Sektzia Ness Tziona (1)
Hapoel Jerusalem (1)	0–1	Maccabi Petah Tikva (2)
Hapoel Nir Ramat HaSharon (2)	2–0	F.C. Holon Yermiyahu (3)
Hapoel Rishon LeZion (2)	0–3	Maccabi Bnei Reineh (1)
Maccabi Ahi Nazareth (2)	5–1	F.C. Tzofi Haifa (5)
Hapoel Afula (2)	1–0	Hapoel Tel Aviv (1)
Hapoel Nof HaGalil (2)	0–1	Maccabi Haifa (1)

== Round of 16 ==
Home team	Score	Away team
3 January 2023
Maccabi Tel Aviv (1)	5–0	Bnei Sakhnin (1)
Beitar Jerusalem (1)	1–1 (a.e.t.) (7–6 p)	Ironi Tiberias (2)
Maccabi Ahi Nazareth (2)	0–1	Maccabi Netanya (1)
Hapoel Nir Ramat HaSharon (2)	0–1	FC Ashdod (1)
4 January 2023
Maccabi Bnei Reineh (1)	0–2	Hapoel Petah Tikva (2)
Maccabi Haifa (1)	5–1	Hapoel Haifa (1)
Sektzia Ness Ziona (1)	1–2	Maccabi Petah Tikva (2)
5 January 2023
Hapoel Afula (2)	3–0	Hapoel Kfar Saba (2)

== Quarter-finals ==
Unlike the other competitions stages, the quarterfinals are held in a two-legged format. The draw was held on 5 January 2023 at 14:00 local time.

Team 1	Agg.	Team 2	1st leg	2nd leg
Maccabi Tel Aviv (1)	6–1	Maccabi Petah Tikva (2)	4–0	2–1
Hapoel Afula (2)	2–5	Beitar Jerusalem (1)	0–4	2–1
Hapoel Petah Tikva (2)	3–5	F.C. Ashdod (1)	1–1	2–4
Maccabi Netanya (1)	4–3	Maccabi Haifa (1)	2–2	2–1 (a.e.t.)

== Semi-final ==
The two semifinals matches were held at the Bloomfield Stadium in Tel Aviv and at the Sammy Ofer Stadium in Haifa.

It had been originally decided to hold both semifinals at Sammy Ofer, but later the match between F.C. Ashdod and Maccabi Netanya was moved to Bloomfield, which is closer to both teams' home cities.

2 May 2023	F.C. Ashdod (1)	1–3	Maccabi Netanya (1)	Tel Aviv
20:30		Report		Stadium: Bloomfield Stadium

3 May 2023	Beitar Jerusalem (1)	3–1	Maccabi Tel Aviv (1)	Haifa
20:30		Report		Stadium: Sammy Ofer Stadium

== Final ==
The final was played on 23 May 2023 at the Sammy Ofer Stadium in Haifa between Beitar Jerusalem and Maccabi Netanya.

23 May 2023	Beitar Jerusalem (1)	3–0	Maccabi Netanya (1)	Haifa
				Stadium: Sammy Ofer Stadium; Referee: Gal Leibovitz
