= 2013–14 Liga Alef =

Israeli football season

The 2013–14 Liga Alef season saw Hapoel Kfar Saba (champions of the North Division) and Maccabi Kiryat Gat (champions of the South Division) win the title and promotion to Liga Leumit.

The clubs which were ranked between 2nd to 5th places in each division competed in a promotion play-offs, in which the winner, Ironi Tiberias advanced to the final round, where they beat the 14th placed club in Liga Leumit, Hapoel Katamon Jerusalem 5-1 on aggregate. thus, Ironi Tiberias were also promoted to Liga Leumit.

At the bottom, the bottom two clubs in each division, Maccabi Kafr Kanna, Ahva Arraba (from North division), Maccabi Be'er Ya'akov and Bnei Eilat (from South division) were all automatically relegated to Liga Bet, whilst the two clubs which were ranked in 14th place in each division, Hapoel Daliyat al-Karmel and Maccabi Be'er Sheva were relegated after losing the relegation play-offs.

== Changes from last season ==
=== Team changes ===
- Hapoel Afula and Hapoel Katamon Jerusalem were promoted to Liga Leumit; Hapoel Kfar Saba (to North division), Sektzia Nes Tziona (to South division) were relegated from Liga Leumit.
- Hapoel Kafr Kanna and Maccabi Sektzia Ma'alot-Tarshiha were relegated to Liga Bet from North division; Beitar Nahariya and Hapoel Beit She'an were promoted to the North division from Liga Bet.
- Hapoel Arad, Maccabi Ironi Kfar Yona and Ortodoxim Lod were relegated to Liga Bet from South division; Hapoel Mahane Yehuda, Maccabi Be'er Ya'akov and F.C. Kafr Qasim were promoted to the South division from Liga Bet.

== North Division ==
Pos	Team	Pld	W	D	L	GF	GA	GD	Pts	Promotion or relegation
1	Hapoel Kfar Saba	30	18	9	3	57	21	+36	63	Promoted to Liga Leumit
2	Ironi Tiberias	30	15	9	6	43	28	+15	54	Promotion play-offs
3	F.C. Karmiel Safed	30	15	6	9	42	35	+7	51	Promotion play-offs
4	Hapoel Migdal HaEmek	30	13	11	6	42	29	+13	50	Promotion play-offs
5	Maccabi Daliyat al-Karmel	30	14	7	9	46	35	+11	49	Promotion play-offs
6	Hapoel Herzliya	30	13	6	11	43	34	+9	45	
7	Hapoel Hadera	30	13	5	12	46	45	+1	44	
8	Hapoel Beit She'an	30	12	7	11	54	42	+12	43	
9	Beitar Nahariya	30	12	7	11	40	37	+3	43	
10	Hapoel Asi Gilboa	30	11	7	12	44	35	+9	40	
11	F.C. Givat Olga	30	8	14	8	34	34	0	38	
12	Maccabi Tzur Shalom	30	9	7	14	36	44	−8	34	
13	Maccabi Ironi Kiryat Ata	30	7	9	14	34	44	−10	30	
14	Hapoel Daliyat al-Karmel	30	8	5	17	37	58	−21	29	Relegation play-offs
15	Maccabi Kafr Kanna	30	4	13	13	33	56	−23	25	Relegated to Liga Bet
16	Ahva Arraba	30	4	6	20	28	82	−54	15 (Note: Three points deducted)	Relegated to Liga Bet

== South Division ==
Pos	Team	Pld	W	D	L	GF	GA	GD	Pts	Promotion or relegation
1	Maccabi Kiryat Gat	30	21	5	4	53	16	+37	68	Promoted to Liga Leumit
2	Maccabi Kabilio Jaffa	30	16	5	9	47	27	+20	53	Promotion play-offs
3	Hapoel Azor	30	15	8	7	47	29	+18	53	Promotion play-offs
4	Hapoel Marmorek	30	15	7	8	37	18	+19	52	Promotion play-offs
5	Beitar Kfar Saba	30	12	10	8	30	26	+4	46	Promotion play-offs
6	F.C. Kafr Qasim	30	12	7	11	35	37	−2	43	
7	Maccabi Amishav Petah Tikva	30	11	8	11	34	29	+5	41	
8	Hapoel Kfar Shalem	30	11	8	11	29	28	+1	41	
9	Maccabi Kiryat Malakhi	30	11	5	14	37	40	−3	38	
10	Hapoel Mahane Yehuda	30	11	5	14	30	42	−12	38	
11	Maccabi Sha'arayim	30	9	10	11	31	32	−1	37	
12	Ironi Bat Yam	30	8	11	11	35	35	0	35	Folded
13	Sektzia Nes Tziona	30	12	6	12	31	37	−6	33 (Note: Nine points deducted)	
14	Maccabi Be'er Sheva	30	7	7	16	33	54	−21	28	Relegation play-offs
15	Maccabi Be'er Ya'akov	30	9	7	14	30	42	−12	25	Relegated to Liga Bet
16	Bnei Eilat	30	3	5	22	20	67	−47	14	Relegated to Liga Bet

== Promotion play-offs ==
=== First round ===
Second and third placed clubs played single match at home against the fourth and fifth placed clubs in their respective regional division.

7 May 2014
16:00 UTC+3

Ironi Tiberias	2 – 1	Maccabi Daliyat al-Karmel
Elimelech 49'; Akiva 90'	Report (in Hebrew)	Nasir al-Din 31'

Tiberias Municipal Stadium, Tiberias
Referee: Shahar Arbeli
7 May 2014
16:00 UTC+3

F.C. Karmiel Safed	0 – 2	Hapoel Migdal HaEmek
	Report (in Hebrew)	Siman Tov 61'; Janah 67'

Karmiel Stadium, Karmiel
Referee: Zvika Levi

7 May 2014
16:00 UTC+3

Hapoel Azor	4 – 1 (a.e.t.)	Hapoel Marmorek
Segal 39'; Hakak 92' 115'; Ravid 110'	Report (in Hebrew)	Hajaj 10'

Azor Stadium, Azor
Referee: Liran Liani
7 May 2014
18:00 UTC+3

Maccabi Kabilio Jaffa	0 – 1	Beitar Kfar Saba
	Report (in Hebrew)	Revivo 30'

Hatikva Neighborhood Stadium, Tel Aviv
Referee: Eli Hacmon

Ironi Tiberias and Hapoel Migdal HaEmek (from North division) and Hapoel Azor and Beitar Kfar Saba (from South division) advanced to the second round.

=== Second round ===
The winners of the first round played single match at home of the higher ranked club (from each regional division).

11 May 2014
16:00 UTC+3

Ironi Tiberias	1 – 1 (a.e.t.)	Hapoel Migdal HaEmek
Peleg 58'	Report (in Hebrew)	Rotstein 27'
Penalties
Ben David (penalty scored); Elimelech (penalty scored); Braver (penalty scored); Elmakyes (penalty scored); Shafsha (penalty scored)	5–3	(penalty scored) Siman Tov; (penalty scored) Cohen; (penalty scored) Badash; (penalty missed) Janah

Tiberias Municipal Stadium, Tiberias
Referee: Halim Zatma

11 May 2014
16:00 UTC+3

Hapoel Azor	2 – 0	Beitar Kfar Saba
Zechariah 47'; Levi 78' (p)	Report (in Hebrew)

Azor Stadium, Azor
Referee: Menashe Masiah

Ironi Tiberias and Hapoel Azor advanced to the third round.

=== Third round ===
Ironi Tiberias and Hapoel Azor faced each other for a single match in neutral venue. the winner advanced to the fourth round against the 14th placed club in Liga Leumit.

16 May 2013
15:15 UTC+3

Hapoel Azor	1 – 1	Ironi Tiberias
Geva 15'	Report (in Hebrew)	Siso 31'
Penalties
Asher (penalty scored); Segal (penalty missed); Weizmann (penalty scored); Levi (penalty missed)	2–4	(penalty missed) Ben David; (penalty scored) Lazmi; (penalty scored) Braver; (penalty scored) Elmakyes; (penalty scored) Shafsha

Netanya Stadium, Netanya
Referee: Ziv Adler

Ironi Tiberias advanced to the promotion/relegation play-offs.

=== Fourth round - promotion/relegation play-offs ===
Ironi Tiberias faced the 14th placed in 2013–14 Liga Leumit Hapoel Katamon Jerusalem. the winner on aggregate earned a spot in the 2014–15 Liga Leumit. The matches took place on May 23 and 27, 2014.

23 May 2013
16:00 UTC+3

Hapoel Katamon Jerusalem	0 - 3	Ironi Tiberias
	Report (in Hebrew)	Elimelech 31'; Lazmi 39' 85'

Teddy Stadium, Jerusalem
Referee: Liran Liani

27 May 2014
16:00 UTC+3

Ironi Tiberias	2 - 1	Hapoel Katamon Jerusalem
Akiva 5' (p) Lazmi 36'	Report (in Hebrew)	Aharon 64'

Green Stadium, Nazareth Illit
Referee: Eitan Shmuelevich

Ironi Tiberias won 5–1 on aggregate and promoted to Liga Leumit. Hapoel Katamon Jerusalem relegated to Liga Alef.

== Relegation play-offs ==
=== North play-off ===
The 14th placed club in Liga Alef North, Hapoel Daliyat al-Karmel, faced the Liga Bet North play-offs winner. the winner earned a spot in the 2014–15 Liga Alef.

==== Liga B North A play-off ====
===== Semi-finals =====
29 April 2014	Maccabi Sektzia Ma'alot-Tarshiha	1–1 (a.e.t.) (5–4 p)	F.C. Ahva Kafr Manda	Maalot
16:00 UTC+3	De Kalbo 120'	Report	Issawi 108'	Referee: Jabarin
	Penalties
	Tal (penalty scored); Ya'akov (penalty scored); Ajam (penalty missed); Zaika (penalty scored); Levi (penalty scored); Edri (penalty scored)		(penalty scored) Taha; (penalty scored) Kadah; (penalty scored) M. Zidan; (penalty missed) A. Zidan; (penalty scored) Mandalawi; (penalty missed) Issawi

3 May 2014	Hapoel Kafr Kanna	1–4	Hapoel Shefa-'Amr	Ilut Stadium
20:45 UTC+3	Armaly 73' (pen.)	Report	Haj 44'; Bushnak 51', 55', 63'	Referee: Levi

===== Final =====
7 May 2014	Maccabi Sektzia Ma'alot-Tarshiha	2–1	Hapoel Shefa-'Amr	Ma'alot
16:00 UTC+3	Tal 18', 61'	Report	Kortam 80'	Referee: Greenfeld

==== Liga B North B play-off ====
===== Semi-finals =====
29 April 2014	Hapoel Ironi Baqa al-Gharbiyye	2–1	Maccabi Kafr Qara	Baqa al-Gharbiyye
16:00 UTC+3	Mundia 22'; Cohen 43'	Report	Kabaha 72'	Referee: Zechariah

29 April 2014	Hapoel Iksal	0–1	Maccabi Ahi Iksal	Municipal Stadium, Beit She'an
16:00 UTC+3		Report	Darawshe 49'	Referee: Arbeli

===== Final =====
2 May 2014	Hapoel Ironi Baqa al-Gharbiyye	2–4	Maccabi Ahi Iksal	Baqa al-Gharbiyye
15:00 UTC+3	Cohen 18'; Mundia 36'	Report	Zubidat 53', 90+6'; Darawshe 78', 90+5'	Referee: Dotan

==== Regional final ====
11 May 2014	Maccabi Sektzia Ma'alot-Tarshiha	3–1 (a.e.t.)	Maccabi Ahi Iksal	Ilut Stadium
18:00 UTC+3	De Kalbo 90'; Huari 107'; Tasao 117'	Report	Darawshe 19'	Referee: Layba

=== Relegation/promotion match ===
15 May 2014	Hapoel Daliyat al-Karmel	0–0 (a.e.t.) (5–6 p)	Maccabi Sektzia Ma'alot-Tarshiha	Ilut Stadium
16:30 UTC+3		Report		Referee: Arbeli
	Penalties
	El-Ali (penalty scored); Tweel (penalty scored); Tatur (penalty scored); Atma (penalty scored); Naser el-Din (penalty missed); Zeitun (penalty scored); Al-Kara (penalty missed)		(penalty scored) Tal; (penalty scored) De Kalbo; (penalty scored) Edri; (penalty missed) Zaika; (penalty scored) Levi; (penalty scored) Huari; (penalty scored) Ajam

Maccabi Sektzia Ma'alot-Tarshiha Promoted to Liga Alef; Hapoel Daliyat al-Karmel relegated to Liga Bet.

=== South play-off ===
The 14th placed club in Liga Alef South, Maccabi Be'er Sheva, faced the Liga Bet North play-offs winner. the winner earned a spot in the 2014–15 Liga Alef.

==== Liga B South A play-off ====
===== Semi-finals =====
29 April 2014	Hapoel Hod HaSharon	2–0	Hapoel Bik'at HaYarden	Neve Hadar, Hod HaSharon
16:00 UTC+3	Shporkin 78'; Haloyan 87'	Report		Referee: Dotan

29 April 2014	Maccabi Ironi Kfar Yona	4–2	Hapoel Kiryat Ono	Kfar Yona
16:00 UTC+3	Tzabari 28'; Halwani 50'; Cohen 75'; Nucenovich 90'	Report	Zarbiv 48'; Shemesh 80'	Referee: Bernstein

===== Final =====
2 May 2014	Hapoel Hod HaSharon	3–0 (a.e.t.)	Maccabi Ironi Kfar Yona	Neve Hadar, Hod HaSharon
14:30 UTC+3	Ohayon 91'; Menachem 110'; Weinstein 115' (pen.)	Report		Referee: Jabarin

==== Liga B South B play-off ====
===== Semi-finals =====
29 April 2014	Maccabi Ironi Netivot	1–1 (a.e.t.) (2–4 p)	Hapoel Rahat	Netivot
16:00 UTC+3	Pachima 33'	Report	Al Atamen 60'	Referee: Elkabetz
	Penalties
	Kachlon (penalty scored); Tan'ami (penalty missed); Pachima (penalty scored); Dayan (penalty missed)		(penalty scored) Al Ataika; (penalty scored) Shelly; (penalty scored) Swisa; (penalty scored) Sarusi

29 April 2014	Beitar Giv'at Ze'ev	0–1	Ironi Modi'in	Giv'at Ze'ev
16:00 UTC+3		Report	Sabag 10'	Referee: Leibovich

===== Final =====
2 May 2014	Ironi Modi'in	0–1	Hapoel Rahat	Modi'in
14:30 UTC+3		Report	Abu Bilal 24'	Referee: Wachsberger

==== Regional final ====
9 May 2014	Hapoel Hod HaSharon	2–1	Hapoel Rahat	Ramat Gan Stadium
15:00 UTC+3	Ohayon 18', 48'		Abu Arar 87'	Referee: Simnian

=== Relegation/promotion match ===
14 May 2014	Maccabi Be'er Sheva	0–1	Hapoel Hod HaSharon	Ramat Gan Stadium
18:00 UTC+3		Report	Menachem 89'	Referee: Hacmon

Hapoel Hod HaSharon Promoted to Liga Alef; Maccabi Be'er Sheva relegated to Liga Bet; However, they were eventually reprieved from relegation, after Ironi Bat Yam, which have finished 12th in Liga Alef South, folded during the summer.
