= List of football clubs in Israel =

The following is a list of football clubs in Israel by their league and division as of the 2024–25 season.
The Israeli football league system, which is run by the Israel Football Association (IFA), includes five levels which contain a total of 16 divisions, There are a total of 220 member clubs.

== Premier League clubs (2024-25) ==
| Team | Location |
|---|---|
| Beitar Jerusalem | Jerusalem |
| Bnei Sakhnin | Sakhnin |
| F.C. Ashdod | Ashdod |
| Hapoel Be'er Sheva | Be'er Sheva |
| Hapoel Hadera | Hadera |
| Hapoel Haifa | Haifa |
| Hapoel Jerusalem | Jerusalem |
| Ironi Kiryat Shmona | Kiryat Shmona |
| Ironi Tiberias | Tiberias |
| Maccabi Bnei Reineh | Reineh |
| Maccabi Haifa | Haifa |
| Maccabi Netanya | Netanya |
| Maccabi Petah Tikva | Petah Tikva |
| Maccabi Tel Aviv | Tel Aviv |

== Liga Leumit clubs (2025-26) ==
| Club | Home City |
|---|---|
| Bnei Yehuda Tel Aviv | Tel Aviv |
| F.C. Kafr Qasim | Kafr Qasim |
| F.C. Kiryat Yam | Kiryat Yam |
| Hapoel Acre | Acre |
| Hapoel Hadera | Hadera |
| Hapoel Kfar Saba | Kfar Saba |
| Hapoel Kfar Shalem | Tel Aviv |
| Hapoel Nof HaGalil | Nof HaGalil |
| Hapoel Ra'anana | Ra'anana |
| Hapoel Ramat Gan | Ramat Gan |
| Hapoel Ramat HaSharon | Ramat HaSharon |
| Hapoel Rishon LeZion | Rishon LeZion |
| Ironi Modi'in | Modi'in-Maccabim-Re'ut |
| Maccabi Herzliya | Herzliya |
| Maccabi Jaffa | Tel Aviv |
| Maccabi Petah Tikva | Petah Tikva |

== Liga Alef clubs (2024–25) ==
Liga Alef North

- F.C. Kiryat Yam
- F.C. Tira
- Hapoel Baqa al-Gharbiyye
- Hapoel Bnei Araba
- Hapoel Beit She'an
- Hapoel Bnei Musmus
- Hapoel Bnei Zalafa
- Hapoel Bu'eine
- Hapoel Kafr Kanna
- Hapoel Migdal HaEmek
- Ihud Bnei Shefa-'Amr
- Ironi Nesher
- Maccabi Akhi Nazareth
- Maccabi Ironi Kiryat Ata
- Maccabi Kafr Kanna
- Maccabi Nujeidat
- Maccabi Umm al-Fahm

Liga Alef South

- Hapoel Ashdod
- Nordia Jerusalem
- Dimona
- Jerusalem
- Hapoel Herzliya
- Hapoel Lod
- Hapoel Marmorek
- Holon Yermiyahu
- Ironi Modi'in
- Maccabi Ironi Ashdod
- Maccabi Kiryat Malakhi
- Maccabi Sha'arayim
- Maccabi Yavne
- Tzeirei Tira
- Sektzia Ness Ziona
- Shimshon Kafr Qasim
- Shimshon Tel Aviv

== Liga Bet clubs (2020–21) ==
Liga Bet North A

- Ahi Acre
- Hapoel Arraba
- Ahva Kafr Manda
- Al-Nahda Nazareth
- Beitar Nahariya
- Bnei Bir al-Maksur
- Bnei M.M.B.E.
- Hapoel Tuba-Zangariyye
- Ironi Bnei Kabul
- Maccabi Bnei Nahf
- Maccabi Sektzia Ma'alot-Tarshiha
- Tzeirei Kafr Kanna
- Tzeirei Tamra
- Tzeiri Sakhnin

Liga Bet North B

- F.C. Pardes Hanna Lior Bokar
- Hapoel Beit She'an Mesilot
- Hapoel Bnei Musmus
- Hapoel Ihud Bnei Jatt
- Hapoel Ramot Menashe Megiddo
- Hapoel Sandala Gilboa
- Hapoel Tirat HaCarmel
- Ihud Bnei Baqa
- Ihud Bnei Kafr Qara
- Ironi Nesher
- Maccabi Ahi Iksal
- Maccabi Neve Sha'anan Eldad
- Maccabi Nujeidat Ahmad
- Maccabi Umm al-Fahm

Liga Bet South A

- Beitar Kfar Saba
- Beitar Petah Tikva
- Beitar Ramat Gan
- F.C. Bnei Jaffa Ortodoxim
- Hapoel Hod HaSharon
- Hapoel Kafr Bara
- Hapoel Kafr Qasim Shouaa
- Hapoel Kiryat Ono
- Hapoel Mahane Yehuda
- Hapoel Qalansawe
- Ironi Beit Dagan
- Maccabi Amishav Petah Tikva
- Otzma Holon
- Shimshon Bnei Tayibe
- Shimshon Tel Aviv

Liga Bet South B

- Beitar Ironi Ma'ale Adumim
- Beitar Kiryat Gat
- Beitar Yavne
- Bnei Eilat
- F.C. Be'er Sheva
- F.C. Shikun HaMizrah
- Hapoel Gedera
- Hapoel Lod
- Hapoel Yeruham
- Ironi Kuseife
- Ironi Modi'in
- Maccabi Ironi Netivot
- Maccabi Ironi Sderot
- Maccabi Kiryat Malakhi
- Tzeirei Rahat

== Liga Gimel clubs (2020–21) ==
Liga Gimel Upper Galilee

- Hapoel Bnei Bi'ina
- Hapoel Bnei Deir Al-Asad
- Hapoel Deir Hanna
- Hapoel Nahariya
- Hapoel Shlomi
- Hapoel Tarshiha
- Maccabi Abu Snan
- Maccabi Bnei Jadeidi-Makr

Liga Gimel Lower Galilee

- Ahali Tamra
- Beitar Kafr Kanna
- F.C. Bu'eine-Nujidat
- F.C. Sallama-Misgav
- F.C. Tzeirei Tur'an
- Ihud Bnei Kafr Yasif
- Ironi Bnei Sha'ab
- Maccabi Basmat Tab'un
- Maccabi Ironi Yafa
- Maccabi Tabbash

Liga Gimel Jezreel

- Beitar Afula
- Beitar Ein Mahil
- Beitar Umm al-Fahm
- Bnei Musheirifa Baiada
- Bnei Umm al-Fahm Al Halal
- F.C. Bnei Yafa
- F.C. Kfar Kama
- Hapeol Al-Batuf
- Hapoel al-Ittihad Nazareth
- Hapoel Ein as-Sahla
- Ihud Tzeiri Iksal
- Maccabi Ahva Fureidis
- Maccabi Ein Mahil Gamel

Liga Gimel Samaria

- Beitar Kiryat Ata Kfir
- Beitar Pardes Hanna
- F.C. Bnei Qalansawe
- F.C. Tzeiri Haifa
- Hapoel Bnei Jisr az-Zarqa
- Hapoel Daliyat al-Karmel
- Hapoel Or Akiva
- Hapoel Yokneam
- Maccabi Barkai
- Maccabi Isfiya
- Maccabi Kiryat Yam

Liga Gimel Sharon

- Maccabi Givat Shmuel F.C.
- Beitar Nes Tubruk
- Beitar R.C. Shomron
- Bnei Tira
- F.C. Bnei Ra'anana
- F.C. Ironi Ariel
- F.C. Kafr Qasim Nibrass
- F.C. Netanya
- F.C. Tzeiri Tira
- Hapoel Jaljulia
- Hapoel Oranit
- Maccabi HaSharon Netanya

Liga Gimel Tel Aviv

- Agudat Sport Holon
- Elitzur Jaffa Tel Aviv
- Elitzur Yehud Yotel
- Bnei Yehud
- Hapoel Neve Golan
- Maccabi Pardes Katz
- Maccabi Ironi Or Yehuda
- Maccabi Spartak Ramat Gan
- Beitar Jaffa Zion
- Beitar Ezra
- Maccabi HaShikma Ramat Hen
- Hapoel Tzafririm Holon
- Inter Aliyah F.C.
- Hapoel Ramat Yisrael
- Shikun Vatikim Ramat Gan

Liga Gimel Central

- Beitar Gan Yavne
- Beitar Gedera
- Beitar Giv'at Ze'ev
- Bnei Yeechalal Rehovot
- F.C. Ashdod City
- F.C. Jerusalem
- F.C. Ramla
- F.C. Rishon LeZion
- F.C. Tzeirei Lod
- Hapoel Ashdod
- Hapoel Mevaseret Zion
- Hapoel Nachlat Yehuda
- Hapoel Ramla
- Hapoel Tirat Shalom
- Maccabi Kiryat Ekron

Liga Gimel South

- Maccabi Ashkelon
- F.C. Be'er Sheva Haim Levy
- F.C. Maccabi Yeruham
- F.C. Tzeirei al-Hoshla
- Hapoel Masos/Segev Shalom
- Hapoel Mateh Yehuda
- Hapoel Rahat
- Hapoel Sderot
- Ironi Beit Shemesh
- Maccabi Be'er Sheva
- Maccabi Dimona
- Maccabi Ironi Hura
- Otzma Be'er Sheva
- Tzeiri Lakiya
