= 2011–12 Liga Alef =

Israeli football season

The 2011–12 Liga Alef season saw Hapoel Asi Gilboa (champions of the North Division) and Maccabi Yavne (champions of the South Division) win their regional divisions and qualify for promotion play-offs. Maccabi Yavne won the promotion play-offs and promoted to Liga Leumit.

After playing 8 matches, Maccabi Ironi Jatt (playing in South division) withdrew from the league and their record was annulled, leaving to South division to be played with 15 clubs.

The bottom two clubs in North division, Maccabi Tamra and Ahi Acre and the bottom club in South division, Maccabi HaShikma Ramat Hen were all automatically relegated to Liga Bet, whilst the two clubs which were ranked in 14th place in each division, Hapoel Hadera and Maccabi Ironi Netivot entered a promotion/relegation play-offs, Hapoel Hadera prevailing to stay in Liga Alef, while Maccabi Ironi Netivot were relegated after losing the play-offs.

== Changes from last season ==
=== Format changes ===
- Due to the reduction of the Premier League from 16 to 14 clubs, and as Liga Leumit remained with 16 clubs, only one club was to be promoted from Liga Alef to Liga Leumit. Thus, the two regional champions of Liga Alef was to face each other in two legged promotion play-offs.

=== Team changes ===
- Maccabi Umm al-Fahm and Hapoel Jerusalem were promoted to Liga Leumit; Ahva Arraba (to North division) and Maccabi Ironi Jatt (to South division) were relegated from Liga Leumit.
- Ironi Sayid Umm al-Fahm, Maccabi Kafr Qara and Hapoel Ramot Menashe Megiddo were relegated to Liga Bet from North division; Maccabi Sektzia Ma'alot-Tarshiha, Maccabi Daliyat al-Karmel and F.C. Givat Olga were promoted to the North division from Liga Bet.
- Hapoel Nahlat Yehuda, Hapoel Tzafririm Holon and Shimshon Bnei Tayibe were relegated to Liga Bet from South division; Beitar Kfar Saba, Hapoel Katamon Jerusalem and Ortodoxim Lod were promoted to the South division from Liga Bet.

== North Division ==
Pos	Team	Pld	W	D	L	GF	GA	GD	Pts	Qualification or relegation
1	Hapoel Asi Gilboa	30	22	6	2	65	18	+47	72	Promotion play-offs
2	Ironi Tiberias	30	17	7	6	72	27	+45	58	
3	Hapoel Afula	30	15	8	7	55	39	+16	53	
4	Sektzia Ma'alot	30	14	7	9	54	50	+4	49	
5	Maccabi Daliyat al-Karmel	30	12	10	8	54	33	+21	46	
6	Maccabi Tzur Shalom	30	12	9	9	47	38	+9	45	
7	F.C. Givat Olga	30	13	6	11	44	40	+4	45	
8	Hapoel Daliyat al-Karmel	30	11	7	12	32	42	−10	40	
9	Maccabi Ironi Kiryat Ata	30	10	8	12	38	45	−7	38	
10	F.C. Karmiel Safed	30	8	12	10	46	32	+14	36	
11	Maccabi Kafr Kanna	30	10	4	16	43	56	−13	34	
12	Ahva Arraba	30	7	12	11	29	40	−11	33	
13	Hapoel Kafr Kanna	30	9	6	15	27	50	−23	33	
14	Hapoel Hadera	30	8	8	14	34	48	−14	32	Relegation play-offs
15	Maccabi Tamra	30	7	8	15	27	46	−19	29	Relegated to Liga Bet
16	Ahi Acre	30	3	6	21	33	95	−62	15	Relegated to Liga Bet

== South Division ==
Pos	Team	Pld	W	D	L	GF	GA	GD	Pts	Qualification or relegation
1	Maccabi Yavne	28	15	5	8	42	30	+12	49 (Note: 1 point deducted?)	Promotion play-offs
2	Maccabi Kabilio Jaffa	28	13	8	7	49	32	+17	47	
3	Beitar Kfar Saba	28	13	7	8	39	26	+13	46	
4	Hapoel Katamon	28	13	4	11	40	31	+9	43	
5	Hapoel Marmorek	28	10	10	8	29	19	+10	39 (Note: 1 point deducted?)	
6	Maccabi Amishav Petah Tikva	28	10	9	9	42	42	0	39	
7	Maccabi Kiryat Gat	28	11	5	12	38	46	−8	38	
8	Ortodoxim Lod	28	9	7	12	36	38	−2	34	
9	Bnei Eilat	28	7	13	8	34	38	−4	34	
10	Maccabi Kiryat Malakhi	28	9	7	12	31	40	−9	34	
11	Maccabi Ironi Kfar Yona	28	8	10	10	27	37	−10	34	
12	Hapoel Kfar Shalem	28	8	9	11	29	33	−4	33	
13	Hapoel Arad	28	8	9	11	31	45	−14	33	
14	Maccabi Ironi Netivot	28	7	11	10	26	31	−5	32	Relegation play-offs
15	Maccabi HaShikma Ramat Hen	28	6	12	10	28	33	−5	30	Relegated to Liga Bet

Notes:

Maccabi Ironi Jatt withdrew after playing 8 matches and folded. their results were annulled.

== Promotion play-offs ==
Liga Alef North champions, Hapoel Asi Gilboa and Liga Alef South champions Maccabi Yavne faced each other in the promotion play-offs. the winner on aggregate earned a spot in the 2012–13 Liga Leumit. The matches took place on May 11 and 18, 2012.

11 May 2012
15:00 UTC+3

Maccabi Yavne	0 – 0	Hapoel Asi Gilboa
	Report (in Hebrew)

Yavne Municipal Stadium, Yavne
Referee: Asaf Kenan

18 May 2012
15:00 UTC+3

Hapoel Asi Gilboa	2 – 2	Maccabi Yavne
Gueta 34'; Brooks 87'	Report (in Hebrew)	Segal 63'; Ofir 84'

Ta'anakh Gush Yael Stadium, Ta'anachim
Referee: Eitan Shmuelevich

Maccabi Yavne won on away goals (2–2 on aggregate) and promoted to Liga Leumit.

== Relegation play-offs ==
=== North play-off ===
The 14th placed club in Liga Alef North, Hapoel Hadera, faced Tzeirei Bir al-Maksur (which lost the Liga Bet promotion play-offs to Hapoel Migdal HaEmek 5-6 on penalties after 0-0). the winner earned a spot in the 2012–13 Liga Alef.

16 May 2012
19:00 UTC+3

Hapoel Hadera	2–1	Tzeirei Bir al-Maksur
Nistel 31'; Zana 58'	Report	Hrib 76'

Ilut Stadium
Referee: Shitrit

Hapoel Hadera remained in Liga Alef.

=== South play-off ===
The 14th placed club in Liga Alef South, Maccabi Ironi Netivot, faced Hapoel Azor (which lost the Liga Bet promotion play-offs to Maccabi Sha'arayim 1-2). the winner earned a spot in the 2012–13 Liga Alef.

16 May 2012
19:30 UTC+3

Maccabi Ironi Netivot	0–1	Hapoel Azor
	Report (in Hebrew)	Kahlon 30'

Haberfeld Stadium
Referee: Papir

Maccabi Ironi Netivot relegated to Liga Bet.
