= 2010–11 Liga Alef =

Israeli football season

The 2010–11 Liga Alef season saw Maccabi Umm al-Fahm (champions of the North Division) and Hapoel Jerusalem (champions of the South Division) win the title and promotion to Liga Leumit.

At the bottom, the bottom two clubs in each division, Maccabi Kafr Qara, Hapoel Ramot Menashe Megiddo (from North division), Hapoel Tzafririm Holon and Shimshon Bnei Tayibe (from South division) were all automatically relegated to Liga Bet, whilst the two clubs ranked in 14th place in each division, Ironi Sayid Umm al-Fahm and Hapoel Nahlat Yehuda entered a promotion/relegation play-offs, and both relegated to Liga Bet after losing the play-offs.

== Changes from last season ==
=== Format changes ===
- The clubs placed 2nd to 5th in each division would participate in a promotion play-offs, a knockout tournament. In the first round, in each division the 2nd placed club would play the 5th placed club and the 3rd placed club would play the 4th placed club. In the second round, the two first round winners would play each other. In the first two rounds the higher ranked club would have home advantage. In the third round both divisional play-off winner would play each other in a neutral venue for a place in a promotion/relegation play-off against the 14th placed club in Liga Leumit, which would be played over two home and away matches.

=== Team changes ===
- Maccabi Ironi Jatt and Hapoel Herzliya were promoted to Liga Leumit; Hapoel Jerusalem and Hapoel Marmorek (both to South division) were relegated from Liga Leumit.
- Hapoel Hadera was transferred from South division to North division.
- Hapoel Bnei Jadeidi, Hapoel Bnei Tamra and Maccabi Tirat HaCarmel were relegated to Liga Bet from North division; Ahi Acre, Hapoel Daliyat al-Karmel and Hapoel Ramot Menashe Megiddo were promoted to the North division from Liga Bet.
- Beitar Kfar Saba and Hapoel Mevaseret Zion were relegated to Liga Bet from South division; Maccabi Kabilio Jaffa and Bnei Eilat were promoted to the South division from Liga Bet.

== North Division ==
Pos	Team	Pld	W	D	L	GF	GA	GD	Pts	Promotion or relegation
1	Maccabi Umm al-Fahm	30	22	6	2	62	13	+49	72	Promoted to Liga Leumit
2	Hapoel Asi Gilboa	30	17	8	5	52	24	+28	59	Promotion play-offs
3	Maccabi Ironi Kiryat Ata	30	17	8	5	48	27	+21	59	Promotion play-offs
4	Hapoel Afula	30	17	5	8	54	25	+29	56	Promotion play-offs
5	Ironi Tiberias	30	13	12	5	41	26	+15	51	Promotion play-offs
6	F.C. Karmiel Safed	30	12	7	11	37	34	+3	43	
7	Hapoel Daliyat al-Karmel	30	12	6	12	38	38	0	42	
8	Hapoel Hadera	30	11	7	12	48	46	+2	40	
9	Maccabi Tzur Shalom	30	11	7	12	36	41	−5	40	
10	Maccabi Tamra	30	8	11	11	40	38	+2	35	
11	Ahi Acre	30	8	6	16	30	38	−8	30	
12	Maccabi Kafr Kanna	30	6	11	13	25	39	−14	29	
13	Hapoel Kafr Kanna	30	5	14	11	25	47	−22	29	
14	Ironi Sayid Umm al-Fahm	30	7	7	16	20	45	−25	28	Relegation play-offs
15	Maccabi Kafr Qara	30	6	5	19	24	67	−43	23	Relegated to Liga Bet
16	Hapoel Ramot Menashe Megiddo	30	5	6	19	29	61	−32	21	Relegated to Liga Bet

== South Division ==
Pos	Team	Pld	W	D	L	GF	GA	GD	Pts	Promotion or relegation
1	Hapoel Jerusalem	30	21	6	3	56	18	+38	69	Promoted to Liga Leumit
2	Maccabi Kiryat Malakhi	30	18	4	8	39	29	+10	58	Promotion play-offs
3	Bnei Eilat	30	16	8	6	45	31	+14	56	Promotion play-offs
4	Maccabi Kabilio Jaffa	30	13	11	6	36	21	+15	50	Promotion play-offs
5	Hapoel Kfar Shalem	30	14	7	9	51	38	+13	49	Promotion play-offs
6	Maccabi Ironi Netivot	30	14	7	9	44	34	+10	49	
7	Maccabi Ironi Kfar Yona	30	12	9	9	37	23	+14	45	
8	Maccabi Amishav Petah Tikva	30	9	12	9	27	30	−3	39	
9	Maccabi HaShikma Ramat Hen	30	9	11	10	32	24	+8	38	
10	Maccabi Yavne	30	9	9	12	45	47	−2	36	
11	Hapoel Arad	30	8	10	12	31	43	−12	34	
12	Hapoel Marmorek	30	8	8	14	20	35	−15	32	
13	Maccabi Kiryat Gat	30	7	10	13	23	47	−24	31	
14	Hapoel Nahlat Yehuda	30	7	4	19	29	54	−25	25	Relegation play-offs
15	Tzafririm Holon	30	4	12	14	21	38	−17	24	Relegated to Liga Bet
16	Shimshon Bnei Tayibe	30	5	4	21	14	38	−24	19	Relegated to Liga Bet

== Promotion play-offs ==
=== First round ===
Second and third placed clubs played single match at home against the fourth and fifth placed clubs in their respective regional division.

12 May 2011
16:15 UTC+3

Hapoel Asi Gilboa	4 – 1	Ironi Tiberias
Ambrose 20' 29'; Swisa 42'; Dar 55'	Report (in Hebrew)	Amar 46'

Ta'anakh Gush Yael Stadium, Ta'anachim
Referee: Nir Amar
12 May 2011
16:19 UTC+3

Maccabi Ironi Kiryat Ata	0 – 1 (a.e.t.)	Hapoel Afula
	Report (in Hebrew)	Shaut 115'

Kiryat Ata Stadium, Kiryat Ata
Referee: Erez Papir

12 May 2011
16:15 UTC+3

Maccabi Kiryat Malakhi	2 – 0	Hapoel Kfar Shalem
Asau 3'; Va'aknin 89'	Report (in Hebrew)

Kiryat Malakhi Stadium, Kiryat Malakhi
Referee: Ebrahim Abuzaila
12 May 2011
16:15 UTC+3

Bnei Eilat	2 – 3	Maccabi Kabilio Jaffa
Malka 15' 86'	Report (in Hebrew)	Molcho 38'; Tzemah 72'(p) David 90+3'

Northern Coast Stadium, Eilat
Referee: Roi Reinshreiber

Hapoel Asi Gilboa and Hapoel Afula (from North division) and Maccabi Kiryat Malakhi and Maccabi Kabilio Jaffa (from South division) advanced to the second round.

=== Second round ===
The winners of the first round played single match at home of the higher ranked club (from each regional division).

16 May 2011
16:15 UTC+3

Hapoel Asi Gilboa	1 – 1 (a.e.t.) 5-4 (pen.)	Hapoel Afula
Deri 32'	Report (in Hebrew)	Schwartzman 86 (p)'

Ta'anakh Gush Yael Stadium, Ta'anachim
Referee: Eitan Shmuelevich

16 May 2011
16:15 UTC+3

Maccabi Kiryat Malakhi	1 – 3	Maccabi Kabilio Jaffa
Asau 30'	Report (in Hebrew)	Cohen Tzedek 45'; Berkovich 48'; Farij 85'

Kiryat Malakhi Stadium, Kiryat Malakhi
Referee: Meir Levi

Hapoel Asi Gilboa and Maccabi Kabilio Jaffa advanced to the third round.

=== Third round ===
Hapoel Asi Gilboa and Maccabi Kabilio Jaffa faced each other for a single match in neutral venue. the winner advanced to the fourth round against the 14th placed club in Liga Leumit.

20 May 2011
16:00 UTC+3

Maccabi Kabilio Jaffa	3 – 1	Hapoel Asi Gilboa
Cohen Tzedek 52'; David 87'; Hatari 90'	Report (in Hebrew)	Danan 40'

Sar-Tov Stadium, Netanya
Referee: Moshe Bohbot

Maccabi Kabilio Jaffa advanced to the fourth round.

=== Fourth round ===
Maccabi Kabilio Jaffa faced the 14th placed in 2010–11 Liga Leumit Hakoah Ramat Gan. the winner on aggregate earned a spot in the 2011–12 Liga Leumit. The matches took place on May 26 and 31, 2011.

26 May 2011
17:00 UTC+3

Maccabi Kabilio Jaffa	1 – 2	Hakoah Ramat Gan
Malka 83'	Report	Shmaya 4'; Saloniki 25'

New Holon Stadium, Holon
Referee: Eitan Shmuelevich

31 May 2011
19:45 UTC+3

Hakoah Ramat Gan	1 – 1	Maccabi Kabilio Jaffa
Reps 2'	Report	Hatari 90+5'

Winter Stadium, Ramat Gan
Referee: Ziv Adler

Hakoah Ramat Gan won 3–2 on aggregate and remained in Liga Leumit. Maccabi Kabilio Jaffa remained in Liga Alef.

== Relegation play-offs ==
=== North play-off ===
The 14th placed club in Liga Alef North, Ironi Sayid Umm al-Fahm, faced the Liga Bet play-offs winner, F.C. Givat Olga. the winner earned a spot in the 2011–12 Liga Alef.

18 May 2011
17:00 UTC+3

F.C. Givat Olga	3 – 2	Ironi Sayid Umm al-Fahm
Janah 32' 48' 73'	Report (in Hebrew)	Agbaria 70'; Mehajna 80'

Ilut Stadium, Ilut
Referee: Guy Berger

Ironi Sayid Umm al-Fahm relegated to Liga Bet.

=== South play-off ===
The 14th placed club in Liga Alef South, Hapoel Nahlat Yehuda, faced the Liga Bet play-offs winner, Ortodoxim Lod. the winner earned a spot in the 2011–12 Liga Alef.

17 May 2011
17:00 UTC+3

Ortodoxim Lod	3 – 0	Hapoel Nahlat Yehuda
Asulin 27' 89'; Abukasis 65'	Report (in Hebrew)

Bat Yam Municipal Stadium, Bat Yam
Referee: Asaf Kenan

Hapoel Nahlat Yehuda relegated to Liga Bet.
