= 2010–11 Liga Bet =

Israeli football season

The 2010–11 Liga Bet season saw Maccabi Sektzia Ma'alot-Tarshiha (champions of the North A division), Maccabi Daliyat al-Karmel (champions of the North B division), Beitar Kfar Saba (champions of the South A division) and Hapoel Katamon Jerusalem (champions of the South B division) winning the title and promotion to Liga Alef.

The clubs ranked 2nd to 5th in each division entered a promotion play-off, at the end of which, in the North section F.C. Givat Olga won against Ironi Sayid Umm al-Fahm from Liga Alef North and, while in the South section, Ortodoxim Lod won against Hapoel Nahlat Yehuda from Liga Alef South. Both club were promoted to Liga Alef.

At the bottom, Hapoel Oranit (from South A division) finished bottom of its division and was automatically relegated to Liga Gimel. Maccabi Kafr Sumei (from North A division), Bnei Jisr az-Zarqa (from North B division) and Ironi Ramla (from South B division) were expelled from the league during the season and had their results nullified.

The clubs ranked 12th to 15th in each division entered a relegation play-off, at the end of which Hapoel Nahariya (from North A division), Hapoel Ar'ara (from North B division), Beitar Petah Tikva (from South A division) and Beitar Giv'at Ze'ev (from South B division) dropped to Liga Gimel as well.

== North A Division ==
Pos	Team	Pld	W	D	L	GF	GA	GD	Pts	Promotion or relegation
1	Maccabi Sektzia Ma'alot-Tarshiha	28	19	5	4	67	23	+44	62	Promoted to Liga Alef
2	Hapoel Ihud Bnei Sumei	28	15	7	6	45	28	+17	52	Promotion play-offs
3	Ahva Kafr Manda	28	12	11	5	42	31	+11	47	Promotion play-offs
4	Hapoel Sakhnin	28	12	9	7	38	29	+9	45	Promotion play-offs
5	Bnei Kabul	28	11	9	8	54	43	+11	42	Promotion play-offs
6	Hapoel Shefa-'Amr	28	12	5	11	43	36	+7	41	
7	F.C. Tzeirei Bir al-Maksur	28	11	8	9	44	33	+11	41	
8	Maccabi Acre	28	9	10	9	38	39	−1	37	
9	Hapoel Ahva Haifa	28	10	6	12	42	42	0	36	
10	Hapoel Kaukab	28	8	10	10	36	41	−5	34	
11	Beitar Haifa	28	9	6	13	42	53	−11	33	
12	Hapoel Nahariya	28	8	7	13	34	50	−16	31	Relegation play-offs
13	Beitar Nahariya	28	8	7	13	35	37	−2	31	Relegation play-offs
14	Ihud Bnei Majd al-Krum	28	6	8	14	31	46	−15	26	Relegation play-offs
15	Hapoel Bnei Jadeidi	28	4	8	16	41	72	−31	18 (Note: 2 points deducted?)	Relegation play-offs

Notes:

Maccabi Kafr Sumei was dismissed from the league and its results were nullified.

== North B Division ==
Pos	Team	Pld	W	D	L	GF	GA	GD	Pts	Promotion or relegation
1	Maccabi Daliyat al-Karmel	28	19	6	3	61	15	+46	63	Promoted to Liga Alef
2	F.C. Givat Olga	28	17	6	5	62	29	+33	57	Promotion play-offs
3	Hapoel Migdal HaEmek	28	16	5	7	62	22	+40	53	Promotion play-offs
4	Ironi Nesher	28	15	4	9	55	36	+19	49	Promotion play-offs
5	Hapoel Isfiya	28	14	7	7	49	42	+7	49	Promotion play-offs
6	Hapoel Beit She'an/Mesilot	28	14	2	12	46	39	+7	44	
7	Maccabi Ahi Iksal	28	11	6	11	44	44	0	39	
8	F.C. Kfar Kama	28	11	6	11	46	47	−1	39	
9	Maccabi Barta'a	28	10	7	11	44	48	−4	37	
10	Ihud Bnei Baqa	28	9	5	14	36	63	−27	32	
11	Hapoel Umm al-Ghanam/Nein	28	9	5	14	43	57	−14	31 (Note: 1 point deducted.)	
12	Hapoel Iksal	28	7	8	13	39	44	−5	29	Relegation play-offs
13	Maccabi Or Akiva	28	7	6	15	27	45	−18	27	Relegation play-offs
14	Hapoel Ar'ara	28	7	5	16	34	52	−18	26	Relegation play-offs
15	Maccabi Tirat HaCarmel	28	3	4	21	23	88	−65	12	Relegation play-offs

Notes:

Bnei Jisr az-Zarqa was dismissed from the league and its results were nullified.

== South A Division ==
Pos	Team	Pld	W	D	L	GF	GA	GD	Pts	Promotion or relegation
1	Beitar Kfar Saba	30	26	3	1	104	29	+75	81	Promoted to Liga Alef
2	Hapoel Mahane Yehuda	30	20	6	4	57	24	+33	66	Promotion play-offs
3	Hapoel Azor	30	17	6	7	60	35	+25	57	Promotion play-offs
4	F.C. Kafr Qasim	30	16	6	8	57	43	+14	52 (Note: 2 points deducted.)	Promotion play-offs
5	Ortodoxim Jaffa	30	15	6	9	54	42	+12	51	Promotion play-offs
6	Hapoel Kiryat Ono	30	11	9	10	33	40	−7	42	
7	F.C. Bnei Jaffa	30	13	2	15	42	47	−5	41	
8	Ironi Or Yehuda	30	11	8	11	47	45	+2	41	
9	Maccabi Bnei Jaljulia	30	11	5	14	43	55	−12	38	
10	Hapoel Bik'at HaYarden	30	10	6	14	47	54	−7	36	
11	Maccabi HaSharon Netanya	30	9	8	13	35	47	−12	35	
12	Beitar Ramat Gan	30	9	6	15	32	44	−12	33	Relegation play-offs
13	Hapoel Pardesiya	30	8	7	15	36	54	−18	31	Relegation play-offs
14	Beitar Petah Tikva	30	7	6	17	31	52	−21	27	Relegation play-offs
15	Shikun Vatikim Ramat Gan	30	6	4	20	22	53	−31	22	Relegation play-offs
16	Hapoel Oranit	30	6	2	22	36	72	−36	20	Relegated to Liga Gimel

== South B Division ==
Pos	Team	Pld	W	D	L	GF	GA	GD	Pts	Promotion or relegation
1	Hapoel Katamon Jerusalem	28	22	5	1	74	20	+54	71	Promoted to Liga Alef
2	Maccabi Sha'arayim	28	19	2	7	50	29	+21	59	Promotion play-offs
3	Ortodoxim Lod	28	15	5	8	37	26	+11	50	Promotion play-offs
4	F.C. Shikun HaMizrach	28	14	7	7	43	22	+21	49	Promotion play-offs
5	Beitar Ma'ale Adumim	28	14	7	7	51	30	+21	49	Promotion play-offs
6	Hapoel Merhavim	28	13	7	8	66	42	+24	46	
7	Maccabi Sderot	28	12	6	10	31	35	−4	42	
8	Bnei Yichalel Rehovot	28	11	4	13	53	50	+3	37	
9	F.C. Be'er Sheva	28	7	10	11	47	52	−5	31	
10	Mo'adon Tzeirei Rahat	28	9	3	16	35	61	−26	30	
11	Hapoel Rahat	28	9	3	16	34	57	−23	30	
12	F.C. Dimona	28	8	6	14	38	53	−15	30	Relegation play-offs
13	F.C. Kiryat Gat	28	7	7	14	29	46	−17	28	Relegation play-offs
14	Beitar Giv'at Ze'ev	28	7	5	16	36	43	−7	26	Relegation play-offs
15	Hapoel Mevasseret Zion	28	3	3	22	31	89	−58	10 (Note: 2 points deducted.)	Relegation play-offs

Notes:

Ironi Ramla was dismissed from the league and its results were nullified.

== Promotion play-offs ==
=== North divisions ===
==== North A division ====
===== Semi-finals =====
3 May 2011	Hapoel Ihud Bnei Sumei	1–2	Bnei Kabul	Kafr Sumei
16:15	Harish 16'	Report	Darwish 24' (pen.); Khulad 80'	Referee: Uda

3 May 2011	F.C. Ahva Kafr Manda	2–0	Hapoel Sakhnin	Kaukab
16:15	Mu'ari 12' (o.g.); Zidane 47'	Report		Referee: Kelez

Bnei Kabul and F.C. Ahva Kafr Manda advanced to the North A division promotion play-offs final.

===== Final =====
6 May 2011	F.C. Ahva Kafr Manda	0–2	Bnei Kabul	Doha Stadium
16:00		Report	Bushnak 1'; Khulad 73'	Referee: Arbeli

Bnei Kabul advanced to the North regional final.

==== North B division ====
===== Semi-finals =====
3 May 2011	F.C. Givat Olga	2–0	Hapoel Isfiya	Givat Olga Stadium, Hadera
16:15	Balibilia 14' (pen.); Taka 52'	Report		Referee: Siminyan

3 May 2011	Hapoel Migdal HaEmek	3–1	Ironi Nesher	Green Stadium
16:15	Kol-Tuv 1'; Abu Khamis 82'; Peretz 90+4'	Report	Ashkenazi 38'	Referee: Jabarin

F.C. Givat Olga and Hapoel Migdal HaEmek advanced to the North B division promotion play-offs final.

===== Final =====
6 May 2011	F.C. Givat Olga	4–3	Hapoel Migdal HaEmek	Givat Olga Stadium, Hadera
17:00	Balbilia 6', 45'; Guma 58'; Taka 68'	Report	Tarka 26', 31'; Malul 42'	Referee: Adler

F.C. Givat Olga advanced to the North regional final.

==== North Regional final ====
12 May 2011	Bnei Kabul	2–3	F.C. Givat Olga	Ilut Stadium
17:00	Hammam 54', 90+2'	Report	Vaturi 22'; Taka 72'; Janah 86'	Referee: Levi

F.C. Givat Olga advanced to the promotion play-off match against Ironi Sayid Umm al-Fahm from Liga Alef.

==== Promotion play-off Match ====
18 May 2011	Ironi Sayid Umm al-Fahm	2–3	F.C. Givat Olga	Ilut Stadium
17:00	Janah 32', 48', 73'	Report	Agbariya 70'; Mahajne 80'	Referee: Berger

F.C. Givat Olga promoted to Liga Alef; Ironi Sayid Umm al-Fahm relegated to Liga Bet.

=== South divisions ===
==== South A division ====
===== Semi-finals =====
3 May 2011	Hapoel Mahane Yehuda	1–0	Ortodoxim Jaffa	Zecharia Ratzabi Stadium, Petah Tikva
16:15	Rozen 75'	Report		Referee: Salooma

3 May 2011	Hapoel Azor	0–2	F.C. Kafr Qasim	Azor
16:15		Report	Sarsur 75', 88'	Referee: Alaluf

Hapoel Mahane Yehuda and F.C. Kafr Kasim advanced to the South A division promotion play-offs final.

===== Final =====
6 May 2011	Hapoel Mahane Yehuda	0–0 (a.e.t.) (5–4 p)	F.C. Kafr Qasim	Zecharia Ratzabi Stadium, Petah Tikva
15:00		Report		Referee: Vaknin
	Penalties
	Rozen (penalty scored); Kakoun (penalty missed); Sapir (penalty scored); Kadosh (penalty scored); Fisher (penalty missed); Elias (penalty scored); Tuina (penalty scored)		(penalty scored) Betzalel; (penalty missed) Sarsur; (penalty missed) Sabah; (penalty scored) Ron; (penalty scored) Ben-Lulu; (penalty scored) Larry; (penalty missed) Uda

Hapoel Mahane Yehuda advanced to the South regional final.

==== South B division ====
===== Semi-finals =====
3 May 2011	Maccabi Sha'arayim	1–0	Beitar Ma'ale Adumim	Maccabi Sha'arayim Stadium, Rehovot
16:15	Ovadia 15'	Report		Referee: Ben Simon

4 May 2010	Ortodoxim Lod	1–0	F.C. Shikun HaMizrach	Lod
16:00	Aizenkot 74'	Report		Referee: Hagashi

Maccabi Sha'arayim and Ortodoxim Lod advanced to the South B division promotion play-offs final.

===== Final =====
6 May 2010	Maccabi Sha'arayim	0–0 (a.e.t.) (4–5 p)	Ortodoxim Lod	Maccabi Sha'arayim Stadium, Rehovot
15:30		Report		Referee: Bar Natan
	Penalties
	Yerimi (penalty scored); Pailer (penalty scored); Fadlon (penalty scored); Rubin (penalty missed); Ben Haim (penalty scored); Tronach (penalty missed)		(penalty scored) Aizenkot; (penalty scored) Zaitouni; (penalty scored) Ben-Uliel; (penalty scored) Abekasis; (penalty missed) Zuzut; (penalty scored) Ohayon

Ortodoxim Lod advanced to the South Regional final.

==== South Regional final ====
12 May 2011	Hapoel Mahane Yehuda	0–2	Ortodoxim Lod	Bat Yam Municipal Stadium
17:00		Report	Asulin 80'; Ben-Uliel 87'	Referee: Adler

Ortodoxim Lod advanced to the promotion play-off match against Hapoel Nahlat Yehuda from Liga Alef.

==== Promotion play-off Match ====
17 May 2010	Hapoel Nahlat Yehuda	0–3	Ortodoxim Lod	Bat Yam Municipal Stadium
17:00		Report	Asulin 27', 89'; Abekasis 65'	Referee: Keinan

Ortodoxim Lod promoted to Liga Alef; Hapoel Nahlat Yehuda relegated to Liga Bet.

== Relegation play-offs ==
=== North A division ===
==== Semi-finals ====
3 May 2011	Beitar Nahariya	1–0	Ihud Bnei Majd al-Krum	Nahariya
14:15	Sharvit 15'	267676 Report		Referee: Zecharia

3 May 2011	Hapoel Nahariya	1–3	Hapoel Bnei Jadeidi	Nahariya
16:30	Ben Simon 1'	Report	Sha'aban 44', 78'; Ben-Yosef 90'	Referee: Azran

Hapoel Bnei Jadeidi and Beitar Nahariya remained in Liga Bet. Ihud Bnei Majd al-Krum and Hapoel Nahariya qualified for the North A division relegation play-off final.

==== Final ====
6 May 2011	Hapoel Nahariya	0–1	Ihud Bnei Majd al-Krum	Nahariya
16:00		Report	Abu-Romi 25'	Referee: Levi

Ihud Bnei Majd al-Krum remained in Liga Bet. Hapoel Nahariya relegated to Liga Gimel.

=== North B division ===
==== Semi-finals ====
3 May 2011	Hapoel Iksal	3–0	Maccabi Tirat HaCarmel	Iksal
16:15	Darawshe 31'; As'ad 81'; Abdelhaddi 84'	Report		Referee: Amar

3 May 2011	Maccabi Or Akiva	2–1	Hapoel Ar'ara	Or Akiva
16:15	Mekonen 50'; Israelov 65'	Report	Mahajne 55'	Referee: Israeli

Hapoel Iksal and Maccabi Or Akiva remained in Liga Bet. Maccabi Tirat HaCarmel and Hapoel Ar'ara qualified for the North B division relegation play-off final.

==== Final ====
5 May 2010	Hapoel Ar'ara	1–4	Maccabi Tirat HaCarmel	Ar'ara
16:00	Abu-Rima 9'	Report	Tal 10', 40'; Ben Lulu 83'; Gez 90'	Referee: Dotan

Maccabi Tirat HaCarmel remained in Liga Bet. Hapoel Ar'ara relegated to Liga Gimel.

=== South A division ===
==== Semi-finals ====
3 May 2011	Beitar Ramat Gan	2–2 (a.e.t.) (2–4 p)	Shikun Vatikim Ramat Gan	Ramat Gan Training ground
16:15	Jerbi 55', 85' (pen.)	Report	Teper 90'; Mor 90'	Referee: Namshitz
	Penalties
	Nahum (penalty scored); Goldstein (penalty missed); Sha'abin (penalty scored); Stern (penalty missed)		(penalty scored) Partouk; (penalty scored) Teper; (penalty scored) Salem; (penalty scored) Yemini

3 May 2011	Hapoel Pardesiya	2–0 (a.e.t.)	Beitar Petah Tikva	Pardesiya
16:15	Maman 105'; Reuven 112'	Report		Referee: Avdilov

Shikun Vatikim Ramat Gan and Hapoel Pardesiya remained in Liga Bet. Beitar Petah Tikva and Beitar Ramat Gan qualified for the South A division relegation play-off final.

==== Final ====
6 May 2011	Beitar Ramat Gan	2–2 (a.e.t.) (4–2 p)	Beitar Petah Tikva	Ramat Gan Training ground
16:00	Nahum 60'; Jerbi 83'	Report	Rozenfeld 13'; Tagana 31'	Referee: Wachsberger
	Penalties
	Bachar (penalty scored); Sha'abin (penalty scored); Librovski (penalty scored); Kaftzan (penalty scored)		(penalty scored) Suramello; (penalty scored) Eliyahu; (penalty missed) Dvora; (penalty missed) Rozolio

Beitar Ramat Gan remained in Liga Bet. Beitar Petah Tikva relegated to Liga Gimel.

=== South B division ===
==== Semi-finals ====
3 May 2011	F.C. Dimona	0–1	Hapoel Mevaseret Zion	Dimona
16:15		Report	el-Ubra 55'	Referee: Abramov

3 May 2011	F.C. Kiryat Gat	5–0	Beitar Giv'at Zeev	Kiryat Gat
16:15	Sudmi 16'; Mor-Yosef 32', 35', 60'; Daniel 86'	Report		Referee: Elkabetz

Hapoel Mevaseret Zion and F.C. Kiryat Gat remained in Liga Bet. F.C. Dimona and Beitar Giv'at Zeev qualified for the South B division relegation play-off final.

==== Final ====
5 May 2010	F.C. Dimona	1–0 (a.e.t.)	Beitar Giv'at Zeev	Dimona
16:00	Bastcon 100'	Report		Referee: Bernstein

F.C. Dimona remained in Liga Bet. Beitar Giv'at Zeev relegated to Liga Gimel.
