= 2012–13 Liga Alef =

Israeli football season

The 2012–13 Liga Alef season saw Hapoel Afula (champions of the North Division) and Hapoel Katamon (champions of the South Division) win the title and promotion to Liga Leumit. Beitar Kfar Saba won the promotion play-offs and met Beitar Tel Aviv Ramla of Liga Leumit and lost 2–4 on aggregate and thus remained in Liga Alef.

At the bottom, the bottom two clubs in each division, Hapoel Kafr Kanna, Maccabi Sektzia Ma'alot-Tarshiha (from North division), Maccabi Ironi Kfar Yona and Ortodoxim Lod were all automatically relegated to Liga Bet, whilst the two clubs which were ranked in 14th place in each division, Maccabi Kafr Kanna and Hapoel Arad entered a promotion/relegation play-offs, Maccabi Kafr Kanna prevailing to stay in Liga Alef, while Hapoel Arad were relegated after losing the play-offs.

== Changes from last season ==
=== Format changes ===
- The divisions reverted to being played under the same rules as 2010–11 Liga Alef, with the champions of each division winning promotion, the clubs ranked 2nd to 5th entering promotion play-offs, the clubs ranked 14th entering relegation play-offs and the bottom two clubs relegating automatically to Liga Bet.

=== Team changes ===
- Maccabi Yavne were promoted to Liga Leumit; Hapoel Herzliya (to North division), Maccabi Be'er Sheva and Maccabi Ironi Bat Yam (to South division) were relegated from Liga Leumit.
- Maccabi Ironi Jatt withdrew from the league mid-season and folded.
- Maccabi Tamra, and Ahi Acre were relegated to Liga Bet from North division; Hapoel Migdal HaEmek was promoted to the North division from Liga Bet.
- Maccabi Netivot and Maccabi HaShikma Ramat Hen were relegated to Liga Bet from South division; Hapoel Azor and Maccabi Sha'arayim were promoted to the South division from Liga Bet.

== North Division ==
Pos	Team	Pld	W	D	L	GF	GA	GD	Pts	Promotion or relegation
1	Hapoel Afula	30	22	4	4	65	17	+48	70	Promoted to Liga Leumit
2	Maccabi Daliyat al-Karmel	30	16	12	2	45	22	+23	60	Promotion play-offs
3	Hapoel Migdal HaEmek	30	15	11	4	45	25	+20	56	Promotion play-offs
4	Hapoel Asi Gilboa	30	12	11	7	38	27	+11	47	Promotion play-offs
5	Hapoel Herzliya	30	12	10	8	40	32	+8	46	Promotion play-offs
6	Ironi Tiberias	30	11	10	9	35	25	+10	43	
7	Hapoel Hadera	30	10	7	13	42	40	+2	37	
8	Maccabi Tzur Shalom	30	11	4	15	30	39	−9	37	
9	Maccabi Ironi Kiryat Ata	30	9	10	11	25	35	−10	37	
10	F.C. Karmiel Safed	30	7	13	10	31	33	−2	34	
11	Ahva Arraba	30	9	6	15	22	39	−17	33	
12	Hapoel Daliyat al-Karmel	30	9	6	15	31	53	−22	33	
13	F.C. Givat Olga	30	8	8	14	30	38	−8	32	
14	Maccabi Kafr Kanna	30	7	11	12	19	31	−12	32	Relegation play-offs
15	Hapoel Kafr Kanna	30	6	13	11	25	36	−11	31	Relegated to Liga Bet
16	Sektzia Ma'alot	30	4	8	18	34	65	−31	20	Relegated to Liga Bet

== South Division ==
Pos	Team	Pld	W	D	L	GF	GA	GD	Pts	Promotion or relegation
1	Hapoel Katamon	30	15	12	3	64	33	+31	57	Promoted to Liga Leumit
2	Maccabi Kabilio Jaffa	30	17	6	7	55	31	+24	57	Promotion play-offs
3	Ironi Bat Yam	30	14	10	6	58	36	+22	52	Promotion play-offs
4	Hapoel Azor	30	13	9	8	38	23	+15	48	Promotion play-offs
5	Beitar Kfar Saba	30	13	9	8	43	33	+10	48	Promotion play-offs
6	Maccabi Amishav Petah Tikva	30	13	6	11	47	32	+15	45	
7	Hapoel Kfar Shalem	30	9	13	8	45	35	+10	40	
8	Maccabi Kiryat Gat	30	11	7	12	46	44	+2	40	
9	Maccabi Be'er Sheva	30	11	5	14	38	35	+3	38	
10	Hapoel Marmorek	30	8	14	8	27	28	−1	38	
11	Maccabi Sha'arayim	30	10	8	12	39	44	−5	38	
12	Maccabi Kiryat Malakhi	30	9	8	13	31	35	−4	35	
13	Bnei Eilat	30	8	11	11	36	51	−15	35	
14	Hapoel Arad	30	6	13	11	24	34	−10	31	Relegation play-offs
15	Maccabi Ironi Kfar Yona	30	7	10	13	37	50	−13	31	Relegated to Liga Bet
16	Ortodoxim Lod	30	3	5	22	28	112	−84	14	Relegated to Liga Bet

== Promotion play-offs ==
=== First round ===
Second and third placed clubs played single match at home against the fourth and fifth placed clubs in their respective regional division.

7 May 2013
16:15 UTC+3

Maccabi Daliyat al-Karmel	1 – 2 (a.e.t.)	Hapoel Herzliya
Nasir al-Din 40'	Report (in Hebrew)	Elsabri 61'; Gilkarov 103'

Daliyat al-Karmel Stadium, Daliyat al-Karmel
Referee: Menashe Masiah
7 May 2013
16:15 UTC+3

Hapoel Migdal HaEmek	3 – 0	Hapoel Asi Gilboa
Rotstein 58'; Malka 77' 88'	Report (in Hebrew)

Migdal HaEmek Stadium, Migdal HaEmek
Referee: Asaf Kenan

7 May 2013
16:15 UTC+3

Maccabi Kabilio Jaffa	0 – 2	Beitar Kfar Saba
	Report (in Hebrew)	Shick 30'; Deri 90'

New Holon Stadium, Holon
Referee: Eli Hacmon
7 May 2013
19:00 UTC+3

Ironi Bat Yam	0 – 1	Hapoel Azor
	Report (in Hebrew)	Segal 68'

Bat Yam Municipal Stadium, Bat Yam
Referee: Orel Grinfeeld

Hapoel Migdal HaEmek and Hapoel Herzliya (from North division) and Hapoel Azor and Beitar Kfar Saba (from South division) advanced to the second round.

=== Second round ===
The winners of the first round played single match at home of the higher ranked club (from each regional division).

10 May 2013
15:30 UTC+3

Hapoel Migdal HaEmek	2 – 1	Hapoel Herzliya
Malul 28'; Malka 52'	Report (in Hebrew)	Aton 29'

Migdal HaEmek Stadium, Migdal HaEmek
Referee: Daniel Bar Natan

10 May 2013
15:30 UTC+3

Hapoel Azor	0 – 1	Beitar Kfar Saba
	Report (in Hebrew)	Deri 83'

Azor Stadium, Azor
Referee: Liran Wachsberger

Hapoel Migdal HaEmek and Beitar Kfar Saba advanced to the third round.

=== Third round ===
Hapoel Migdal HaEmek and Beitar Kfar Saba faced each other for a single match in neutral venue. the winner advanced to the fourth round against the 14th placed club in Liga Leumit.

16 May 2013
19:00 UTC+3

Beitar Kfar Saba	1 – 0	Hapoel Migdal HaEmek
Porat 8'	Report (in Hebrew)

Netanya Stadium, Netanya
Referee: Menashe Masiah

Beitar Kfar Saba advanced to the fourth round.

=== Fourth round ===
Beitar Kfar Saba faced the 14th placed in 2012–13 Liga Leumit Beitar Tel Aviv Ramla. the winner on aggregate earned a spot in the 2013–14 Liga Leumit. The matches took place on May 24 and 28, 2013.

24 May 2013
16:00 UTC+3

Beitar Kfar Saba	1 – 1	Beitar Tel Aviv Ramla
Revivo 53'	Report	Ben Shushan 30'

Levita Stadium, Kfar Saba
Referee: Orel Grinfeeld

28 May 2013
19:30 UTC+3

Beitar Tel Aviv Ramla	3 – 1	Beitar Kfar Saba
Amos 14', 58'; Soltan 78'	Report	Deri 40'

Winter Stadium, Ramat Gan
Referee: Eli Hacmon

Beitar Tel Aviv Ramla won 4–2 on aggregate and remained in Liga Leumit. Beitar Kfar Saba remained in Liga Alef.

== Relegation play-offs ==
=== North play-off ===
The 14th placed club in Liga Alef North, Maccabi Kafr Kanna, faced the Liga Bet play-offs winner, Hapoel Iksal. the winner earned a spot in the 2013–14 Liga Alef.

15 May 2013
19:00 UTC+3

Hapoel Iksal	1 – 1 (a.e.t.) 3-4 (pen.)	Maccabi Kafr Kanna
Dahan 78'	Report (in Hebrew)	Khatib 54'

Ilut Stadium, Ilut
Referee: Orel Grinfeeld

Maccabi Kafr Kanna remained in Liga Alef.

=== South play-off ===
The 14th placed club in Liga Alef South, Hapoel Arad, faced the Liga Bet play-offs winner, F.C. Kafr Qasim. the winner earned a spot in the 2013–14 Liga Alef.

12 May 2013
19:00 UTC+3

F.C. Kafr Qasim	0 – 0 (a.e.t.) 9-8 (pen.)	Hapoel Arad
	Report (in Hebrew)

Haberfeld Stadium, Rishon LeZion
Referee: Eitan Shmuelevich

Hapoel Arad relegated to Liga Bet.
