= 2011–12 Liga Bet =

Israeli football season

The 2011–12 Liga Bet season saw Tzeirei Bir al-Maksur (champions of the North A division), Hapoel Migdal HaEmek (champions of the North B division), Hapoel Azor (champions of the South A division) and Maccabi Sha'arayim (champions of the South B division) win their regional divisions and qualify for promotion play-offs. Hapoel Migdal HaEmek and Maccabi Sha'arayim won the promotion play-offs and promoted to Liga Alef, while Tzeirei Bir al-Maksur and Hapoel Azor played for promotion against the 14th ranked club from Liga Alef, Hapoel Azor winning and gaining promotion as well and Tzeirei Bir al-Maksur losing and remaining in Liga Bet.

At the bottom, Maccabi Tirat HaCarmel, Hapoel Bnei Jadeidi (from North A division), Maccabi Or Akiva, Maccabi Barta'a (from North B division), Hapoel Pardesiya, Shimshon Bnei Tayibe (from South A division), Maccabi Sderot and Hapoel Mevaseret Zion (from South B division) were all automatically relegated to Liga Gimel

== North A Division ==
| Pos | Team | Pld | W | D | L | GF | GA | GD | Pts | Qualification or relegation |
|---|---|---|---|---|---|---|---|---|---|---|
| 1 | F.C. Tzeirei Bir al-Maksur | 28 | 22 | 3 | 3 | 20 | 62 | −42 | 69 | Promotion play-offs |
| 2 | Ihud Bnei Majd al-Krum | 28 | 21 | 5 | 2 | 19 | 63 | −44 | 68 | |
| 3 | Hapoel Kaukab | 28 | 15 | 7 | 6 | 24 | 49 | −25 | 52 | |
| 4 | Hapoel Ahva Haifa | 28 | 13 | 6 | 9 | 63 | 59 | +4 | 45 | |
| 5 | Bnei Kabul | 28 | 13 | 4 | 11 | 39 | 50 | −11 | 43 | |
| 6 | Beitar Haifa | 28 | 11 | 6 | 11 | 48 | 51 | −3 | 39 | |
| 7 | Maccabi Acre | 28 | 10 | 8 | 10 | 41 | 57 | −16 | 38 | |
| 8 | F.C. Bnei Arraba | 28 | 11 | 7 | 10 | 50 | 42 | +8 | 37 (Note: 3 points deducted.) | |
| 9 | F.C. Ahva Kafr Manda | 28 | 10 | 3 | 15 | 45 | 41 | +4 | 33 | |
| 10 | Hapoel Sakhnin | 28 | 8 | 8 | 12 | 61 | 57 | +4 | 32 | |
| 11 | Beitar Nahariya | 28 | 9 | 4 | 15 | 43 | 36 | +7 | 31 | |
| 12 | Hapoel Shefa-'Amr | 28 | 7 | 10 | 11 | 36 | 30 | +6 | 31 | |
| 13 | Hapoel Ihud Bnei Sumei | 28 | 8 | 4 | 16 | 62 | 46 | +16 | 28 | |
| 14 | F.C. Bu'eine | 28 | 5 | 7 | 16 | 73 | 33 | +40 | 22 | |
| 15 | Maccabi Tirat HaCarmel | 28 | 3 | 6 | 19 | 84 | 32 | +52 | 15 | Relegated to Liga Gimel |

Notes:

Hapoel Bnei Jadeidi was dismissed from the league, demoted to Liga Gimel and its results were nullified.

== North B Division ==
| Pos | Team | Pld | W | D | L | GF | GA | GD | Pts | Qualification or relegation |
|---|---|---|---|---|---|---|---|---|---|---|
| 1 | Hapoel Migdal HaEmek | 28 | 21 | 5 | 2 | 16 | 72 | −56 | 68 | Promotion play-offs |
| 2 | Hapoel Beit She'an/Mesilot | 28 | 18 | 7 | 3 | 19 | 77 | −58 | 61 | |
| 3 | F.C. Kfar Kama | 28 | 13 | 7 | 8 | 44 | 45 | −1 | 46 | |
| 4 | Ironi Nesher | 28 | 12 | 8 | 8 | 41 | 65 | −24 | 44 | |
| 5 | Maccabi Ahi Iksal | 28 | 12 | 5 | 11 | 50 | 45 | +5 | 41 | |
| 6 | Hapoel Ramot Menashe Megiddo | 28 | 10 | 6 | 12 | 52 | 55 | −3 | 36 | |
| 7 | F.C. Daburiyya | 28 | 10 | 6 | 12 | 57 | 56 | +1 | 36 | |
| 8 | Maccabi Kafr Qara | 28 | 10 | 5 | 13 | 49 | 42 | +7 | 35 | |
| 9 | Hapoel Isfiya | 28 | 9 | 8 | 11 | 47 | 41 | +6 | 35 | |
| 10 | Ihud Bnei Baka | 28 | 9 | 7 | 12 | 69 | 45 | +24 | 34 | |
| 11 | Maccabi Ein Mahil | 28 | 9 | 5 | 14 | 68 | 39 | +29 | 32 | |
| 12 | Hapoel Iksal | 28 | 8 | 8 | 12 | 39 | 33 | +6 | 32 | |
| 13 | Hapoel Baqa al-Gharbiyye | 28 | 8 | 6 | 14 | 54 | 34 | +20 | 30 | |
| 14 | Hapoel Umm al-Ghanem Nein | 28 | 8 | 5 | 15 | 68 | 50 | +18 | 29 | |
| 15 | Maccabi Or Akiva | 28 | 7 | 4 | 17 | 52 | 26 | +26 | 25 | Relegated to Liga Gimel |

Maccabi Barta'a was dismissed from the league, demoted to Liga Gimel and its results were nullified.

== South A Division ==
| Pos | Team | Pld | W | D | L | GF | GA | GD | Pts | Qualification or relegation |
|---|---|---|---|---|---|---|---|---|---|---|
| 1 | Hapoel Azor | 28 | 23 | 2 | 3 | 20 | 87 | −67 | 71 | Promotion play-offs |
| 2 | F.C. Ironi Or Yehuda | 28 | 14 | 7 | 7 | 31 | 41 | −10 | 49 | |
| 3 | Hapoel Mahane Yehuda | 28 | 13 | 8 | 7 | 30 | 44 | −14 | 47 | |
| 4 | Ortodoxim Jaffa | 28 | 13 | 8 | 7 | 48 | 57 | −9 | 47 | |
| 5 | F.C. Tira | 28 | 13 | 7 | 8 | 34 | 51 | −17 | 46 | |
| 6 | F.C. Bnei Jaffa | 28 | 11 | 8 | 9 | 40 | 45 | −5 | 41 | |
| 7 | F.C. Kafr Qasim | 28 | 10 | 7 | 11 | 38 | 43 | −5 | 37 | |
| 8 | Hapoel Bik'at HaYarden | 28 | 10 | 5 | 13 | 59 | 41 | +18 | 35 | |
| 9 | Gadna Tel Aviv | 28 | 10 | 5 | 13 | 66 | 44 | +22 | 35 | |
| 10 | Beitar Ramat Gan | 28 | 10 | 4 | 14 | 57 | 44 | +13 | 34 | |
| 11 | Hapoel Kiryat Ono | 28 | 8 | 7 | 13 | 45 | 36 | +9 | 31 | |
| 12 | Shikun Vatikim Ramat Gan | 28 | 7 | 7 | 14 | 50 | 36 | +14 | 28 | |
| 13 | Maccabi HaSharon Netanya | 28 | 6 | 10 | 12 | 50 | 31 | +19 | 28 | |
| 14 | Maccabi Bnei Jaljulia | 28 | 6 | 8 | 14 | 62 | 31 | +31 | 26 | |
| 15 | Hapoel Pardesiya | 28 | 4 | 11 | 13 | 38 | 37 | +1 | 23 | Relegated to Liga Gimel |

Shimshon Bnei Tayibe was dismissed from the league, demoted to Liga Gimel and its results were nullified.

== South B Division ==
| Pos | Team | Pld | W | D | L | GF | GA | GD | Pts | Qualification or relegation |
|---|---|---|---|---|---|---|---|---|---|---|
| 1 | Maccabi Sha'arayim | 30 | 24 | 4 | 2 | 22 | 68 | −46 | 76 | Promotion play-offs |
| 2 | Hapoel Nahlat Yehuda | 30 | 18 | 2 | 10 | 37 | 59 | −22 | 56 | |
| 3 | Maccabi Be'er Ya'akov | 30 | 15 | 10 | 5 | 25 | 50 | −25 | 55 | |
| 4 | Hapoel Merhavim | 30 | 13 | 8 | 9 | 45 | 65 | −20 | 47 | |
| 5 | F.C. Kiryat Gat | 30 | 14 | 4 | 12 | 42 | 49 | −7 | 46 | |
| 6 | F.C. Shikun HaMizrach | 30 | 13 | 7 | 10 | 47 | 55 | −8 | 46 | |
| 7 | Beitar Ma'ale Adumim | 30 | 13 | 7 | 10 | 27 | 36 | −9 | 46 | |
| 8 | Hapoel Rahat | 30 | 13 | 6 | 11 | 51 | 44 | +7 | 45 | |
| 9 | Hapoel Hod HaSharon | 30 | 11 | 5 | 14 | 58 | 47 | +11 | 38 | |
| 10 | Hapoel Tzafririm Holon | 30 | 10 | 7 | 13 | 36 | 34 | +2 | 37 | |
| 11 | F.C. Be'er Sheva | 30 | 9 | 8 | 13 | 54 | 47 | +7 | 35 | |
| 12 | F.C. Dimona | 30 | 11 | 1 | 18 | 50 | 32 | +18 | 34 | |
| 13 | Moadon Tzeirei Rahat | 30 | 9 | 7 | 14 | 45 | 27 | +18 | 34 | |
| 14 | Bnei Yichalel Rehovot | 30 | 9 | 6 | 15 | 44 | 46 | −2 | 33 | |
| 15 | Maccabi Sderot | 30 | 7 | 8 | 15 | 46 | 35 | +11 | 29 | Relegated to Liga Gimel |
| 16 | Hapoel Mevaseret Zion | 30 | 4 | 4 | 22 | 93 | 28 | +65 | 16 | Relegated to Liga Gimel |

== Promotion play-offs ==
=== North divisions ===
==== Final ====
| 10 May 2012 | Hapoel Migdal HaEmek | 0–0 (a.e.t.) (6–5 p) | Tzeirei Bir al-Maksur | Ilut Stadium |
| 19:00 | | Report | | Referee: Grinfeld |
| | Penalties |
| | Siman Tov (penalty scored); A. Malul (penalty scored); Buskila (penalty scored); Darawshe (penalty missed); Tarka (penalty scored); O. Malul (penalty scored); Kol-Tuv (penalty scored) | | (penalty scored) Hrib; (penalty scored) Abu Ahmad; (penalty missed) Hamze; (penalty scored) Bushnak; (penalty scored) N. Ghadir; (penalty scored) W. Ghadir; (penalty missed) Namarne |

Hapoel Migdal HaEmek promoted to Liga Alef; Tzeirei Bir al-Maksur advanced to promotion/relegation match against Hapoel Hadera from Liga Alef.

==== Promotion play-off match ====
| 16 May 2012 | Hapoel Hadera | 2–1 | Tzeirei Bir al-Maksur | Ilut Stadium |
| 19:00 | Nistel 31'; Zana 58' | Report | Hrib 76' | Referee: Shitrit |

Hapoel Hadera remained in Liga Alef; Tzeirei Bir al-Maksur remained in Liga Bet.

=== South divisions ===
==== Final ====
| 10 May 2012 | Hapoel Azor | 1–2 | Maccabi Sha'arayim | Haberfeld Stadium |
| 19:30 | Rotem 88' | Report | Yerimi 53'; Ezra 56' | Referee: Adler |

Maccabi Sha'arayim promoted to Liga Alef; Hapoel Azor advanced to promotion/relegation match against Maccabi Netivot from Liga Alef.

==== Promotion play-off match ====
| 16 May 2012 | Maccabi Ironi Netivot | 0–1 | Hapoel Azor | Haberfeld Stadium |
| 19:30 | | Report | Kahlon 30' | Referee: Papir |

Hapoel Azor promoted to Liga Alef; Maccabi Netivot relegated to Liga Bet.
