= 2012–13 Liga Bet =

Israeli football season

The 2012–13 Liga Bet season saw Beitar Nahariya (champions of the North A division), Hapoel Beit She'an/Mesilot (champions of the North B division), Hapoel Mahane Yehuda (champions of the South A division) and Maccabi Be'er Ya'akov (champions of the South B division) win the title and promotion to Liga Alef.

The clubs ranked 2nd to 5th in each division entered a promotion play-off, at the end of which, in the North section Hapoel Iksal lost against Maccabi Kafr Kanna from Liga Alef North and remained in Liga Bet, while, in the South section, F.C. Kafr Qasim won against Hapoel Arad from Liga Alef South and was promoted to Liga Alef.

At the bottom, F.C. Tzeirei Bir al-Maksur (from North A division), Ihud Bnei Baka (from North B division), Shikun Vatikim Ramat Gan (from South A division), and Bnei Yehud (from South B division) were all automatically relegated to Liga Gimel.

The clubs ranked 12th to 15th in each division entered a relegation play-off, at the end of which Hapoel Ahva Haifa (from North A division), F.C. Kfar Kama (from North B division), Gadna Tel Aviv (from South A division) and Hapoel Merhavim (from South B division) dropped to Liga Gimel as well.

== North A Division ==
Pos	Team	Pld	W	D	L	GF	GA	GD	Pts	Promotion or relegation
1	Beitar Nahariya	30	20	7	3	70	29	+41	67	Promoted to Liga Alef
2	Ihud Bnei Majd al-Krum	30	15	9	6	50	36	+14	54	Promotion play-offs
3	Bnei Kabul	30	14	7	9	44	35	+9	49	Promotion play-offs
4	Hapoel Kaukab	30	12	10	8	54	36	+18	46	Promotion play-offs
5	F.C. Bnei Arraba	30	12	8	10	40	39	+1	44	Promotion play-offs
6	Ahi Acre	30	11	11	8	53	40	+13	44	
7	Maccabi Tamra	30	12	6	12	38	35	+3	42	
8	Bnei Maghar	30	11	7	12	32	41	−9	40	
9	Maccabi Acre	30	10	9	11	50	47	+3	39	
10	F.C. Ahva Kafr Manda	30	11	4	15	44	46	−2	37	
11	Beitar Haifa	30	10	6	14	49	62	−13	36	
12	Hapoel Shefa-'Amr	30	9	9	12	41	49	−8	36	Relegation play-offs
13	Hapoel Ahva Haifa	30	9	7	14	33	45	−12	34	Relegation play-offs
14	Hapoel Ihud Bnei Sumei	30	8	9	13	46	60	−14	33	Relegation play-offs
15	Hapoel Sakhnin	30	8	7	15	37	69	−32	30 (Note: 1 point deducted.)	Relegation play-offs
16	F.C. Tzeirei Bir al-Maksur	30	5	10	15	36	48	−12	25	Relegated to Liga Gimel

== North B Division ==
Pos	Team	Pld	W	D	L	GF	GA	GD	Pts	Promotion or relegation
1	Hapoel Beit She'an/Mesilot	30	27	1	2	109	23	+86	82	Promoted to Liga Alef
2	Maccabi Ahi Iksal	30	17	9	4	75	35	+40	60	Promotion play-offs
3	Hapoel Iksal	30	17	8	5	66	34	+32	59	Promotion play-offs
4	F.C. Tzeirei Tur'an	30	17	6	7	65	40	+25	57	Promotion play-offs
5	Hapoel Umm al-Fahm	30	14	7	9	52	39	+13	49	Promotion play-offs
6	Hapoel Baqa al-Gharbiyye	30	13	8	9	40	45	−5	47	
7	Maccabi Kafr Qara	30	12	8	10	58	40	+18	44	
8	Hapoel Ramot Menashe Megiddo	30	12	6	12	55	49	+6	42	
9	Ironi Nesher	30	12	5	13	58	52	+6	41	
10	F.C. Daburiyya	30	11	4	15	53	59	−6	37	
11	Hapoel Umm al-Ghanem Nein	30	11	5	14	47	51	−4	36 (Note: 2 points deducted?)	
12	Maccabi Ein Mahil	30	9	9	12	59	67	−8	31 (Note: 5 points deducted?)	Relegation play-offs
13	Hapoel Isfiya	30	5	6	19	32	66	−34	21	Relegation play-offs
14	F.C. Bu'eine	30	4	8	18	23	79	−56	20	Relegation play-offs
15	F.C. Kfar Kama	30	5	4	21	34	90	−56	19	Relegation play-offs
16	Ihud Bnei Baqa	30	4	6	20	32	89	−57	18	Relegated to Liga Gimel

== South A Division ==
Pos	Team	Pld	W	D	L	GF	GA	GD	Pts	Promotion or relegation
1	Hapoel Mahane Yehuda	30	22	5	3	81	21	+60	71	Promoted to Liga Alef
2	F.C. Kafr Qasim	30	20	6	4	63	19	+44	66	Promotion play-offs
3	Hapoel Bik'at HaYarden	30	20	5	5	54	29	+25	65	Promotion play-offs
4	F.C. Tira	30	18	7	5	56	31	+25	61	Promotion play-offs
5	F.C. Bnei Jaffa Ortodoxim	30	14	5	11	54	43	+11	47	Promotion play-offs
6	Beitar Petah Tikva	30	14	3	13	45	55	−10	45	
7	Hapoel Morasha Ramat HaSharon	30	10	9	11	57	54	+3	39	
8	Otzma F.C. Holon	30	12	2	16	65	68	−3	38	
9	F.C. Ironi Or Yehuda	30	12	1	17	48	50	−2	37	
10	Beitar Ramat Gan	30	11	4	15	61	60	+1	37	
11	Hapoel Hod HaSharon	30	10	6	14	49	46	+3	36	
12	Maccabi HaSharon Netanya	30	9	8	13	35	62	−27	35	Relegation play-offs
13	Hapoel Kiryat Ono	30	8	10	12	29	38	−9	34	Relegation play-offs
14	Gadna Tel Aviv	30	8	3	19	39	76	−37	27	Relegation play-offs
15	Maccabi Bnei Jaljulia	30	7	6	17	32	59	−27	27	Relegation play-offs
16	Shikun Vatikim Ramat Gan	30	3	4	23	26	83	−57	13	Relegated to Liga Gimel

== South B Division ==
Pos	Team	Pld	W	D	L	GF	GA	GD	Pts	Promotion or relegation
1	Maccabi Be'er Ya'akov	30	22	5	3	75	28	+47	71	Promoted to Liga Alef
2	Maccabi Netivot	30	19	7	4	67	23	+44	64	Promotion play-offs
3	Beitar Giv'at Ze'ev	30	19	5	6	61	24	+37	62	Promotion play-offs
4	Hapoel Tzafririm Holon	30	18	7	5	51	28	+23	61	Promotion play-offs
5	F.C. Shikun HaMizrach	30	18	6	6	70	31	+39	60	Promotion play-offs
6	Hapoel Nahlat Yehuda	30	16	7	7	72	34	+38	55	
7	Ironi Modi'in	30	14	5	11	71	50	+21	47	
8	Bnei Yichalel Rehovot	30	12	8	10	47	41	+6	44	
9	Beitar Ma'ale Adumim	30	12	6	12	47	51	−4	41 (Note: 1 point deducted?)	
10	Ironi Beit Shemesh	30	9	8	13	49	57	−8	35	
11	Hapoel Rahat	30	10	4	16	47	64	−17	34	
12	Moadon Tzeirei Rahat	30	9	6	15	44	54	−10	33	Relegation play-offs
13	F.C. Dimona	30	6	3	21	25	75	−50	21	Relegation play-offs
14	Hapoel Merhavim	30	5	5	20	43	78	−35	20	Relegation play-offs
15	F.C. Be'er Sheva	30	5	2	23	50	98	−48	17	Relegation play-offs
16	Bnei Yehud	30	2	4	24	26	109	−83	10	Relegated to Liga Gimel

== Promotion play-offs ==
=== Northern Divisions ===
Division semi-finals
2	Ihud Bnei Majd al-Krum	0 (2)
5	F.C. Bnei Arraba	0 (4)
North A division
3	Bnei Kabul	1
4	Hapoel Kaukab	2
2	Maccabi Ahi Iksal	2
5	Hapoel Umm al-Fahm	1
North B division
3	Hapoel Iksal	3 (5)
4	F.C. Tzeirei Tur'an	3 (4)

Division final
5	F.C. Bnei Arraba	2
4	Hapoel Kaukab	4
2	Maccabi Ahi Iksal	0
3	Hapoel Iksal	1

Regional final
4NA	Hapoel Kaukab	1
3NB	Hapoel Iksal	4

Hapoel Iksal qualified to the promotion play-off match against 14th ranked club in Liga Alef North division, Maccabi Kafr Kanna.

==== Promotion play-off Match ====
15 May 2013
19:00

Hapoel Iksal	1–1 (a.e.t.)	Maccabi Kafr Kanna
Dahan 78'	Report (in Hebrew)	Khatib 54'
Penalties
Darawshe (penalty scored); Sahan (penalty missed); Shlusberg (penalty scored); Azulai (penalty scored); As'ad (penalty missed)	3–4	(penalty scored) Abdalla; (penalty scored) Siman Tov; (penalty scored) Ghadir; (penalty scored) Saleh

Ilut Stadium
Referee: Grinfeld

Maccabi Kafr Kanna remained in Liga Alef; Hapoel Iksal remained in Liga Bet.

=== Southern Divisions ===
Division semi-finals
2	F.C. Kafr Qasim	3
5	F.C. Bnei Jaffa Ortodoxim	2
South A division
3	Hapoel Bik'at HaYarden	2
4	F.C. Tira	1
2	Maccabi Netivot	2
5	F.C. Shikun HaMizrach	3
South B division
3	Beitar Giv'at Ze'ev	3
4	Hapoel Tzafririm Holon	5

Division final
2	F.C. Kafr Qasim	2
4	Hapoel Bik'at HaYarden	1
5	F.C. Shikun HaMizrach	0 (4)
4	Hapoel Tzafririm Holon	0 (2)

Regional final
2SA	F.C. Kafr Qasim	3
5SB	F.C. Shikun HaMizrach	0

F.C. Kafr Qasim qualified to the promotion play-off match against 14th ranked club in Liga Alef South division, Hapoel Arad.

==== Promotion play-off Match ====
12 May 2013
19:00

F.C. Kafr Qasim	0–0 (a.e.t.)	Hapoel Arad
	Report (in Hebrew)
Penalties
Ben Lulu (penalty scored); Mer'ab (penalty missed); Drei (penalty scored); Amer (penalty scored); M. Sarsur (penalty scored); Sarusi (penalty scored); Sarbush (penalty scored); M. Sarsur (penalty scored); Cohen (penalty scored); A. Sarsur (penalty scored)	9–8	(penalty scored) Elkarat; (penalty scored) Arzuan; (penalty scored) Ovadia; (penalty scored) Saban; (penalty missed) Hazut; (penalty scored) Gozlan; (penalty scored) Weizman; (penalty scored) Karev; (penalty scored) Bezel; (penalty missed) Davidi

Haberfeld Stadium
Referee: Shmuelevich

F.C. Kafr Qasim promoted to Liga Alef; Hapoel Arad relegated to Liga Bet.

== Relegation play-offs ==
=== Northern divisions ===
North A division

Semi-finals
12	Hapoel Shefa-'Amr	1
15	Hapoel Sakhnin	0
13	Hapoel Ahva Haifa	1
14	Ihud Bnei Sumei	6

Final
15	Hapoel Sakhnin	4
13	Hapoel Ahva Haifa	1

Hapoel Ahva Haifa relegated to Liga Gimel

North B division

Semi-finals
12	Maccabi Ein Mahil	3
15	F.C. Kfar Kama	0
13	Hapoel Isfiya	4
14	F.C. Bu'eine	0

Final
15	F.C. Kfar Kama	1 (0)
14	F.C. Bu'eine	1 (3)

F.C. Kfar Kama relegated to Liga Gimel

=== Southern divisions ===
South A division

Semi-finals
12	HaSharon Netanya	2
15	Bnei Jaljulia	1
13	Hapoel Kiryat Ono	2
14	Gadna Tel Aviv	0

Final
15	Bnei Jaljulia	6
14	Gadna Tel Aviv	3

Gadna Tel Aviv relegated to Liga Gimel

South B division

Semi-finals
12	Tzeirei Rahat	1
15	F.C. Be'er Sheva	2
13	F.C. Dimona	4
14	Hapoel Merhavim	1

Final
12	Tzeirei Rahat	4
14	Hapoel Merhavim	2

Hapoel Merhavim relegated to Liga Gimel
