= Omri Elmakyes =

Israeli football forward

Omri Elmakyes עומרי אלמקייס
Personal information
- Full name: Omri Elmakyes
- Date of birth: 21 July 1987 (age 39)
- Place of birth: Poria Illit, Israel
- Position: Forward

Senior career*
Years	Team	Apps	(Gls)
2006–2009	Hapoel Nazareth Illit	63	(9)
2009–2011	Hapoel Acre	8	(2)
2011–2012	Hapoel Nazareth Illit	23	(1)
2012–2014	Ironi Tiberias	39	(10)
2014	Maccabi Ironi Kiryat Ata	7	(0)
2014–2015	Hapoel Asi Gilboa	20	(2)
2015–2016	F.C. Daburiyya	29	(11)
2016–2017	Hapoel F.C. Sandala Gilboa	30	(19)
2017	Tzeirei Kafr Kanna	9	(0)
2017–2020	Hapoel F.C. Sandala Gilboa	24	(10)
- * Club domestic league appearances and goals

Omri Elmakyes (Hebrew: עומרי אלמקייס; born 21 July 1987) is an Israeli football forward.
