= Janah (surname) =

Janah is a surname. Notable people with the surname include:

- Leila Janah (1982–2020), American businesswoman
- Maor Janah (born 1984), Israeli football player
- Sunil Janah (1918—2012), Indian photojournalist and documentary photographer
