= Maor Janah =

Israeli footballer

Maor Janah מאור ג'נח
Personal information
- Full name: Maor Janah
- Date of birth: February 10, 1984 (age 42)
- Place of birth: Haifa, Israel
- Position: Midfielder

Youth career
- Maccabi Haifa

Senior career*
Years	Team	Apps	(Gls)
2001–2008	Maccabi Haifa	2	(0)
2003–2004	→ Hapoel Nazareth Illit (loan)	-	(-)
2004–2006	→ Maccabi Herzliya (loan)	-	(-)
2006–2007	→ Hapoel Ashkelon (loan)	3	(0)
2007–2008	→ Maccabi Ironi Tirat HaCarmel (loan)	9	(3)
2008	Hapoel Umm al-Fahm	3	(0)
2008–2009	Hapoel Nazareth Illit	20	(4)
2009	Ironi Kiryat Shmona	1	(0)
2009–2013	Maccabi Ironi Kiryat Ata	49	(10)
2010–2012	→ F.C. Givat Olga (loan)	43	(14)
2013–2015	Hapoel Migdal HaEmek	41	(14)
2015	Maccabi Ironi Kiryat Ata	10	(5)
2015–2016	Hapoel Hadera	26	(5)
2016	Ihud Bnei Kafr Qara	11	(4)
2016–2017	Hapoel Asi Gilboa	3	(0)
- * Club domestic league appearances and goals

Maor Janah (Hebrew: מאור ג'נח; born February 10, 1984) is a former Israeli professional football (soccer) player.
