= Maccabi Daliyat al-Karmel F.C. =

Israeli football club

Maccabi Daliyat al-Karmel
- Full name: Maccabi Daliyat al-Karmel Football Club מכבי דליית אל כרמל
- Ground: Municipal Stadium, Daliyat al-Karmel
- Chairman: Salah Nasir al-Din
- Manager: Osama Mreeh
- League: Liga Alef North
- 2015–16: 14th
Home colours	Away colours

Maccabi Daliyat al-Karmel (Hebrew: מכבי דליית אל כרמל) is a football club based in Daliyat al-Karmel in northern Israel.

== History ==
The current club was refounded and started in Liga Gimel, the lowest tier of Israeli football, after the previous club with the same name folded during the 2006–07 Liga Bet season, after they failed to show to fixtures and were punished with suspension of activity. in the 2009–10 season, they finished runners-up in the Liga Gimel Samaria division, and promoted to Liga Bet. and in the following season, made another successive promotion, after they won Liga Bet North B division, and were promoted to Liga Alef.

In their first season in Liga Alef, they faced their city rivals, Hapoel Daliyat al-Karmel, for a first derby in Liga Alef. Maccabi won the match 3–1. in the following season, they finished runners-up, 10 points behind champions, Hapoel Afula, and qualified to the promotion play-offs, where they lost in the first round 1–2 to Hapoel Herzliya. in the 2013–14 season, they finished in the fifth place, and once more, qualified to the promotion play-offs, where they lost again in the first round, 1–2 to Ironi Tiberias, which were eventually promoted to Liga Leumit.

Prior to the 2014–15 season, the club merged with Liga Bet club, Hapoel Yokneam.
