= Elias Zana =

Israeli footballer (born 1990)

Personal information
- Full name: Elias Zana
- Date of birth: December 30, 1990 (age 35)
- Place of birth: Hadera, Israel
- Position: Left back

Team information
- Current team: Bnei Herzliya
- Number: 23

Youth career
- Hapoel Hadera
- 2007–2010: Maccabi Netanya

Senior career*
Years	Team	Apps	(Gls)
2009–2010	Maccabi Netanya	0	(0)
2010–2021	Hapoel Hadera	122	(18)
2014–2015	→ Hapoel Daliyat al-Karmel	19	(3)
2015–2016	→ Ihud Bnei Majd al-Krum	16	(1)
2019–2020	→ Hapoel Kfar Shalem	9	(1)
2020–2021	→ Hapoel Iksal	19	(1)
2021–2022	Ironi Tiberias	16	(1)
2022–2025	F.C. Tira	69	(0)
2026–	Bnei Herzliya	2	(0)
- * Club domestic league appearances and goals as of 1 June 2026

Elias Zana (Hebrew: אליאס זאנה; born December 30, 1990) is an Israeli footballer who plays in F.C. Tira.

He made his debut in Maccabi Netanya in a Toto Cup fixture against Bnei Yehuda.
