= Hapoel Sakhnin F.C. =

Football club in Israel

Hapoel Sakhnin
- Full name: Hapoel Sakhnin Football Club הפועל סכנין
- Founded: 1965
- Dissolved: 2015
- Ground: Doha Stadium, Sakhnin
- Capacity: 8,500
- 2014–15: Liga Bet North A, 12th
Home colours	Away colours

Hapoel Sakhnin (Hebrew: הפועל סכנין) was an Israeli football club based in Sakhnin.

== History ==
The club was founded in 1965, and played in the lower divisions of Israeli football, during which time the club was the starting point to the career of Zahi Armeli. In 1991 the club joined forces with Maccabi Sakhnin to form Bnei Sakhnin.

However, the club was soon reformed as a separate entity and maintained its position in the lower divisions. The club announced its dissolution prior to the 2015–16 season.
