= Hapoel F.C. Ortodoxim Lod =

Hapoel F.C. Ortodoxim Lod הפועל מועדון ספורט אורתודוכסים לוד
- Founded: 2003
- Dissolved: 2013
- Ground: Lod Municipal Stadium, Lod
- Capacity: 3,000
- Chairman: (Israel) Susu Munir
- League: Liga Alef (South division)
- 2012–13: 16th

Hapoel F.C. Ortodoxim Lod (Hebrew: הפועל מועדון ספורט אורתודוכסים לוד), also known as Ortodoxim Lod, was a football club, from Lod.

== History ==
The club was founded in 2003 by Salim "Susu" Munir, as a club for the Orthodox Christian-Arab community in Lod, and joined the central division of Liga Gimel, at the sixth tier of the Israeli football league system. The club won its division in 2007–08 and promoted to Liga Bet.

The club played at Liga Bet until the end of the 2010–11 season, as it finished 3rd in its division, and won its way through the promotion play-offs, defeating Hapoel Nahlat Yehuda 3–0 in the play-off promotion match and promoted to Liga Alef. The club played two seasons in Liga Alef, before succumbing to financial problem, which saw the club playing the 2012–13 season with second-string players and forfeiting one league match, against Maccabi Sha'arayim. The club finished bottom of the league and chose to fold in the summer.

== Honours ==
=== League ===
Honour	No.	Years
Sixth tier	1	2007–08

=== Cups ===
Honour	No.	Years
Liga Gimel Central Division Cup	2	2006–07, 2007–08
