= Hapoel Azor F.C. =

Israeli football club

Hapoel Azor
- Full name: Hapoel Azor Football Club הפועל אזור
- Nickname(s): Azuria
- Founded: 1954
- Ground: Azor Stadium, Azor
- Chairman: Shimon Sinwani
- Manager: Mike Mizrahi
- League: Liga Alef South
- 2023–24: Liga Alef South, 15th (relegated)
Home colours	Away colours

Hapoel Azor (Hebrew: הפועל אזור) is an Israeli football club based in Azor. The club currently plays in Liga Alef South division.

== History ==
The club was founded in 1954, and in 1959 was promoted to Liga Bet, the third tier of Israeli football at the time, where they played up until relegation in the 1965–66 season. fifteen years later, the club returned to the third tier (now Liga Alef), in the 1981–82 season, and reached the third place in the 1986–87 season. however, they were relegated to Liga Bet in the following season, and it took the club twenty four years to make a return to Liga Alef, following a successful promotion play-off victory over Maccabi Ironi Netivot.

In their comeback season to Liga Alef, the club finished in the fourth place, and qualified to the promotion play-offs, where they won 1–0 against Ironi Bat Yam, and were eliminated in the second round, after losing 0–1 to Beitar Kfar Saba. the following season was even more successful, as the club equaled their record placing from 1987, by finishing in the third place, and once again qualified to the promotion play-offs, where they won 4–1 after extra time against Hapoel Marmorek, and 2–0 against Beitar Kfar Saba. However, Azor were eliminated in the third round, after losing on penalties 2–4 to the Liga Alef North play-offs winner, Ironi Tiberias, after the match ended in 1–1 draw.

== Honours ==
=== League ===
Honour	No.	Years
Fourth tier	2	1980–81, 2011–12
Fifth tier	1	1977–78

=== Cups ===
Honour	No.	Years
Liga Bet divisional State Cup	3	2007–08, 2008–09, 2011–12
