= Beitar Kfar Saba F.C. =

Israeli football club

Beitar Kfar Saba Football Club
- Founded: 1962
- Ground: Levita Stadium, Kfar Saba
- Capacity: 5,800
- Manager: Maayan Negev
- League: Liga Bet South A
- 2024–25: Liga Bet South A, 13th
Home colours	Away colours

Beitar Kfar Saba Football Club (Hebrew: בית״ר כפר סבא) are a football club, from Israeli city of Kfar Saba. The club plays in Liga Alef South, the third tier of Israeli football. Home matches are played at the Levita Stadium.

== History ==
The club was founded in 1962 and played most of their football seasons in the lower divisions of Israeli Football. Although the club was folded at the end of the 1964–65 season, while playing in Liga Gimel Sharon division, it was reformed in 1971 and joined Liga Dalet. Beitar have reached Liga Bet for the first time in the 1983–84 season.

The club withdrew from Liga Bet in the 1999–2000 season. However, they won Liga Gimel Sharon division in the 2003–04 season and made a return to Liga Bet. In the 2006–07 season, Beitar finished runners-up in Liga Bet South A division, and qualified for the Promotion play-offs, where they were beaten by the third bottom club in Liga Alef South, Hapoel Tzafririm Holon. However, since Hapoel Maxim Lod, which have won Liga Alef South in that season, folded during the summer break, Beitar were promoted to Liga Alef, as they had better winning percentage of the two Liga Bet South divisions' runners-up.

After three seasons in Liga Alef South division, Beitar finished second bottom in the 2009–10 season and relegated back to Liga Bet. However, the club made an immediate return to Liga Alef, after they won Liga Bet South A division in the following season, with a margin of 15 points and 104 goals scored. Their return to Liga Alef was successful, as they finished the 2011–12 season in Liga Alef South in the third place. In the following season, Beitar finished in the fifth place and qualified for the Promotion play-offs, where they made a remarkable run, as without the home advantage, they eliminated the second placed, Maccabi Kabilio Jaffa, with a win of 2–0 in the first round. In the second round, they eliminated the fourth placed, Hapoel Azor, with a win of 1–0, and in the third round, they eliminated the Liga Alef North play-off winner, Hapoel Migdal HaEmek with a win of 1–0, and stood 180 minutes away from historic promotion to Liga Leumit, when they faced the 14th placed in 2012–13 Liga Leumit, Beitar Tel Aviv Ramla. The first leg in Levita Stadium ended in 1–1 draw. Beitar Kfar Saba lost the second leg by a result of 1–3 and remained in Liga Alef.

In the 2013–14 season, Beitar finished fifth and qualified again for the Promotion play-offs, where they faced Maccabi Kabilio Jaffa for the second successive season, and once more ended as winners, this time with a win of 1–0. Beitar were eliminated in the second round after they lost 0–2 to Hapoel Azor.

In the 2014–15 season, Beitar qualified for their third successive Promotion play-offs, following another fifth-place finish. Once more, without the home advantage, they eliminated the second placed, Maccabi Sha'arayim, with a win of 4–2 on penalties after 0–0 draw in the first round and the fourth placed, Hapoel Marmorek, with a win of 3–0 in the second round. However, in the third round, Beitar were beaten 0–1 by the Liga Alef North play-off winner, Ironi Nesher.

== Honours ==
=== League ===
Honour	No.	Years
Fourth tier	1	2010–11
Fifth tier	1	1982–83
Sixth tier	1	2003–04

=== Cups ===
Honour	No.	Years
Liga Bet divisional State Cup	1	2010–11
