= Hapoel Migdal HaEmek F.C. =

Israeli football club

Hapoel Migdal HaEmek
- Full name: Hapoel Migdal HaEmek Football Club הפועל מגדל העמק
- Founded: 1959
- Ground: Municipal Stadium, Migdal HaEmek
- Capacity: 1,000
- Chairman: (Israel) Henry Ifergan
- Manager: (Israel) Patricio Sayegh
- League: Liga Alef North
- 2023–24: Liga Alef North, 11th of 16
Home colours	Away colours

Hapoel Migdal HaEmek (Hebrew: הפועל מגדל העמק) is an Israeli football club based in Migdal HaEmek. The club currently plays in Liga Alef North division.

== History ==
The club was founded in 1959, and in the 1963–64 season appeared for the first time in Liga Bet, the third tier of Israeli football at the time. In the 1970–71 season, the club won Liga Bet North A division, and made historic promotion to Liga Alef, the second tier of Israeli football at the time. Their debut season in Liga Alef, appeared to be their most successful season to date, as they finished the league in the fifth place, and also had success in the Israel State Cup, by eliminating top division club, Hapoel Kfar Saba with a score of 5–2. in the 1973–74 season the club finished bottom in Liga Alef North division, and relegated to Liga Bet after finishing bottom in the relegation play-offs.

Ever since, the club had spells in Liga Alef (now the third tier) in the early 1980s and in the late 1990s until the early 2000s, which ended in relegation to Liga Bet. In the 2011–12 season the club returned to Liga Alef, following a successful promotion play-off victory over Tzeirei Bir al-Maksur after penalties.

In their comeback season to Liga Alef, the club finished in the third place, and qualified to the promotion play-offs, where they won 3–0 against Hapoel Asi Gilboa, and 2–1 against Hapoel Herzliya. Migdal HaEmek were eliminated in the third round, after losing 0–1 to the Liga Alef South play-offs winner, Beitar Kfar Saba. In the following season, the club finished fourth, and once again qualified to the promotion play-offs, where they won in the first round 2–0 against F.C. Karmiel Safed, and were eliminated in the second round, after losing on penalties 3–5 to Ironi Tiberias, after the match ended in 1–1 draw. In the following season, the club finished fifth and qualified to the promotion play-offs for the third successive time. However, they were eliminated in the first round, after losing on penalties 3–4 to Ironi Nesher, after the match ended in 2–2 draw.

== Honours ==
=== League ===
Honour	No.	Years
Third tier	1	1970–71
Fourth tier	4	1962–63, 1980–81, 1997–98, 2011–12

=== Cups ===
Honour	No.	Years
Liga Bet North B Division Cup	1	2007–08
