= F.C. Tira =

Israeli football club

- Full name: Moadon Sport Tira מועדון ספורט טירה
- Founded: 2005
- Ground: Tira Ground, Tira
- Chairman: Aziz Mansour
- Manager: Haim Sirotkin
- League: Liga Alef North
- 2023–24: Liga Alef North, 2nd of 16
Home colours	Away colours

F.C. Tira (Hebrew: מועדון ספורט טירה), Moadon Sport Tira, lit. Tira Sport Club (or in short Hebrew: מ.ס. טירה Mem Samekh Tira, lit. F.C. Tira) is an Israeli football club based in Tira. The club is currently in Liga Alef North division.

== History ==
The club was founded in 2005, after the previous clubs of the city, Hapoel Tira and Maccabi Bnei Tira, were folded in 2004 and 2005 respectively. Upon its establishment, F.C. Tira received the players of the defunct Maccabi Bnei Tira, which in the previous season, following failed attempt to promote the club, received itself the players of the defunct Hapoel Tira, which folded due to economic and political problems, after playing for only one season in Liga Artzit, the third tier of Israeli football at the time, in 2003–04.

F.C. Tira folded in 2009, following consistent failures to achieve promotion from Liga Gimel to Liga Bet. However, the club was reformed after one season hiatus, and with the help of Abet Titi and Haim Yirmiyahu, won Liga Gimel Sharon division in the 2010–11 season and promoted to Liga Bet.

In the 2012–13 season, the club finished fourth in Liga Bet South A division and qualified for the promotion play-offs, where they lost 1–2 to Hapoel Bik'at HaYarden in the first round.

== Honours ==
=== League ===
Honour	No.	Years
Fourth tier	2	1985–86^{1}, 2002–03^{1}
Fifth tier	2	1977–78^{1}, 2010–11

^{1}Achieved by Hapoel Tira

=== Cups ===
Honour	No.	Years
Liga Bet South A Division Cup	1	2012–13
