= Hapoel Bik'at HaYarden F.C. =

Israeli football club

Hapoel Bik'at HaYarden
- Full name: Hapoel Bik'at HaYarden Football Club הפועל בקעת הירדן
- Founded: 1999
- Ground: Moshav Tomer Ground, Tomer
- Chairman: Sharon Ovadia
- Manager: Hanan Azulay
- League: Liga Bet South A
- 2024–25: Liga Bet South A, 7th
Home colours	Away colours

Hapoel Bik'at HaYarden (Hebrew: הפועל בקעת הירדן) is an Israeli football club based in Tomer. The club is currently in Liga Alef South division and play home matches at Moshav Tomer Ground.

== History ==
The club was founded in 1999 in continuation for the youth section, which already existed at the time. Bik'at HaYarden played in Liga Gimel until the 2008–09 season, when they finished runners-up in the Sharon division and faced the Tel Aviv division runners-up, Hapoel Kiryat Ono in a promotion play-off. Although the club lost on penalties, they were eventually promoted to Liga Bet, the fourth tier of Israeli football, after one spot was vacated in that league, following the closure of Hapoel Masos/Segev Shalom.

In the 2012–13 season, the club finished third in Liga Bet South A division and qualified for the promotion play-offs, where they beat F.C. Tira 2–1 in the first round and lost by the same result to F.C. Kafr Qasim in the second round. In the following season, they finished in the fifth place and once more qualified for the promotion play-offs. However this time, they lost in the first round to Hapoel Hod HaSharon by a result of 0–2.

In the 2014–15 season, the club won Liga Bet South A division and made historic promotion to the third tier, Liga Alef, after beating Beitar Petah Tikva by a result of 4–0.

== Honours ==
=== League ===
Honour	No.	Years
Fourth tier	1	2014–15

=== Cup competitions ===
Honour	No.	Years
Liga Gimel Sharon Division Cup	1	2008–09
