= Bnei Eilat F.C. =

Israeli football club

Bnei Eilat
- Full name: Bnei Eilat Football Club מועדון כדורגל בני אילת
- Founded: 2006
- Ground: North Beach, Eilat
- Capacity: 1,000
- Owner: Shimon Hazut
- Manager: Ibrahim Abu Rakayek
- League: Liga Bet South B
- 2024–25: Liga Bet South B, 6th
Home colours	Away colours

Bnei Eilat Football Club (Hebrew: מועדון כדורגל בני אילת) is an Israeli football club based in Eilat. They are currently in Liga Alef South division.

== History ==
Bnei Eilat were founded in 2006 and are not related to the football clubs which have previously operated in Eilat, Hapoel Eilat and A.S. Eilat.

In their first season of existence, the club won Liga Gimel South-Central division and promoted to Liga Bet. In the 2009–10 season, the club won Liga Bet South B division with a margin of 14 points, and promoted to Liga Alef. The following season, was the best season in the club history, after they finished third in Liga Alef South, and qualified for the promotion play-offs, where they lost 2–3 to Maccabi Kabilio Jaffa, after a late goal. In the 2013–14 season, the club finished bottom in Liga Alef South and relegated to Liga Bet. However, in the following season, the club won Liga Bet South B division and made an immediate return to Liga Alef.

== Honours ==
=== League ===
Honour	No.	Years
Fourth tier	2	2009–10, 2014–15
Sixth tier	1	2006–07

=== Cups ===
Honour	No.	Years
Liga Bet divisional State Cup	2	2009–10, 2014–15
