= Beitar Nahariya F.C. =

Israeli football club

Beitar Nahariya
- Full name: Beitar Nahariya Football Club בית"ר נהריה
- Nickname: ״the purple lions”
- Founded: 1962; 2007 (Refouned)
- Ground: Municipal Stadium, Nahariya
- Chairman: (Israel) Yosef Lankri
- Manager: (Israel) Michael Shushan
- League: Liga Bet North A
- 2024–25: Liga Bet North A, 5th
Home colours	Away colours

Beitar Nahariya (Hebrew: בית"ר נהריה) is an Israeli football club based in Nahariya. The club currently plays in Liga Bet North A division.

== History ==
The club was founded in 1962. In their first season of existence, they won their regional division of Liga Gimel and were promoted to Liga Bet. Up until the mid-1980s, Beitar, which has played mostly in the lower divisions of Israeli football, was in the shadow of their local rivals, Hapoel Nahariya, which have played mostly in the second and third tiers of Israeli football. Things were changed in Nahariya as Hapoel were relegated from Liga Alef in the 1981–82 season, and did not return to this league ever since, whilst Beitar made history, by finally reaching Liga Alef in the 1985–86 season, where they finished runners-up in the North division, and qualified to the promotion play-offs, where they beat Hapoel Rishon LeZion 4–3 on aggregate (2–2, 2–1). Thus, the club made their second successive promotion within two seasons, from Liga Bet to Liga Artzit, the second tier of Israeli football at the time.

The club's spell in Liga Artzit lasted only one season, as they finished second bottom in the 1986–87 season, winning only four games, and relegated back to Liga Alef. After another relegation, to Liga Bet, the club folded in 1995.

The club had reformed in 2007 and joined Liga Gimel, the lowest tier of Israeli football, where they finished runners-up in the Upper Galilee division, and were promoted to Liga Bet. In the 2012–13 season, the club won the Liga Bet North A division with a margin of 13 points over the second-placed club, and promoted to Liga Alef.

In 2014–15, the club finished 15th in Liga Alef North, and relegated to Liga Bet. Beitar's local rival Hapoel Nahariya which played in Liga Gimel at the time, merged into the club in 2022.

== Honours ==
=== League ===
Honour	No.	Years
Fourth tier	5	1962–63, 1969–70, 1972–73, 1984–85, 2012–13
Fifth tier	2	1980–81, 1982–83

=== Cups ===
Honour	No.	Years
Liga Bet divisional State Cup	2	2008–09, 2012–13
Liga Gimel divisional State Cup	1	2007–08
