= F.C. Ahva Kafr Manda =

Israeli football club

- Full name: Football Club Ahva Kafr Manda
- Founded: 2006
- Ground: Kafr Manda Stadium
- Chairman: Ahmad Abu Faroq
- Manager: Adel Azam
- League: Liga Bet North A
- 2018–19: 3rd
Home colours	Away colours

F.C. Ahva Kafr Manda (Hebrew: מועדון כדורגל אחווה כפר מנדא) is an Israeli football club based in Kafr Manda. The club currently plays in Liga Bet North A division.

== History ==
The club was founded in 2006 and registered to play in Liga Gimel, where it was placed in the Upper Galilee division. In its first season, the club finished as runners-up and promoted to Liga Bet as best runner-up. The club was placed in North A division, where it still plays today. In 2010–11, the club finished 3rd and qualified to promotion play-offs, falling at the divisional finals. The clubs qualified again to the promotion play-offs in 2013–14, after finishing 4th, but lost in the divisional semi-finals in penalties.

In the cup, the club won the Liga Gimel Upper Galilee divisional state cup in 2006–07 and qualified to the 7th round, where it had lost 2–4 to Hapoel Bnei Tamra (from Liga Artzit). In the following seasons, the club didn't advanced beyond the 4th round.
