= Hapoel Asi Gilboa F.C. =

Israeli football club

Hapoel Asi Gilboa
- Full name: Hapoel Asi Gilboa Football Club הפועל אסי גלבוע
- Nickname(s): Asi, Gilboa
- Founded: 1994
- Dissolved: 2020
- Ground: Gush Yael Stadium, Prazon
- Capacity: 700
- Chairman: Rami Elharar
- League: Liga Alef North
- 2019–20: Liga Alef North, 16th (folded)
Home colours	Away colours

Hapoel Asi Gilboa is an Israeli football club based in Prazon on Mount Gilboa. The club last played in the North division of Liga Alef, but is defunct as of 2020.

== History ==
Hapoel Asi Gilboa founded in 1994 by David Daniel, in honour of his nephew, Asi Daniel, which fell during his line of duty. previously, the club played in regional leagues as Asi Ta'anakh.

With the support of the Gilboa head of regional council at the time, Danny Atar, the club made a progress by winning Liga Gimel Samaria division in 1997, and promotion to Liga Bet. in 2001, the club won the Liga Bet North B division and was promoted to Liga Alef, where the club play today.

In recent years, the club battled for promotion to Liga Leumit, and in the 2011–12 season, the club won Liga Alef North. However, that season, the Israel Football Association decided to reduce the number of clubs in the Israeli Premier League from 16 to 14, and as a result, decided that only one club will be promoted from Liga Alef to Liga Leumit. Hapoel Asi Gilboa had to face the winner of Liga Alef South, Maccabi Yavne in a two legged promotion play-off. first leg in Yavne ended in 0–0 draw, and the second leg, played in the Gush Yael Stadium, ended in 2–2 draw, thus, Maccabi Yavne won on away goals and promoted to Liga Leumit, whilst Hapoel Asi Gilboa remained in Liga Alef.

In the 2014–15 season, Hapoel Asi Gilboa finished third bottom and were surprisingly relegated to Liga Bet, after they were defeated 0–1 by Hapoel Iksal in the Relegation play-offs. However, they were eventually reprieved from relegation, following the merger between Hapoel Hadera and F.C. Givat Olga.

== Honours ==
=== League ===
Honour	No.	Years
Third tier	1	2011–12
Fifth tier	2	1996–97, 2000–01
