= Maccabi Kiryat Malakhi F.C. =

Israeli football club

Maccabi Ironi Kiryat Malakhi
- Full name: Maccabi Ironi Kiryat Malakhi Football Club מכבי עירוני קרית מלאכי
- Founded: 1962
- Ground: Nino Stadium, Kiryat Malakhi
- Capacity: 1,000
- Chairman: Rafi Azulay
- Manager: Rafi Baruch
- League: Liga Alef South
- 2024–25: Liga Alef South, 12th of 16
Home colours	Away colours

Maccabi Ironi Kiryat Malakhi (Hebrew: מכבי עירוני קרית מלאכי) is an Israeli football club based in Kiryat Malakhi. They are currently in Liga Bet South B division.

== History ==
The club was founded in 1962, and played in most of their football seasons in Liga Gimel, the lowest tier of Israeli football.

In the 1993–94 season, the club was promoted to Liga Bet for the first time in their history, after 33 years in Liga Gimel. However, their spell in Liga Bet lasted one season, and they were relegated back to Liga Gimel in the following season.

In 1999, Hapoel Kiryat Malakhi, which have played in Liga Alef, dissolved after major financial problems, and Maccabi remained the only football club in Kiryat Malakhi.

In the 2002–03 season, the club was promoted to Liga Bet for the second time, after they won their regional division of Liga Gimel with a perfect record of 20 wins, without any draw or lose, scoring 110 goals and conceding 11. After three seasons in Liga Bet South B division, the club finished the 2005–06 season in the third place, and were eventually promoted to Liga Alef, after one spot was vacated in the south division, following the merger of Beitar Kiryat Gat and Maccabi Kiryat Gat.

In Liga Alef South division, the highest placing of the club was runners-up finish in the 2010–11 season, and qualification with the home advantage to the promotion play-offs, where they beat Hapoel Kfar Shalem 2–0 in the first round, and were eliminated in the second round after they lost 1–3 to Maccabi Kabilio Jaffa.

Prior to the 2014–15 season, Maccabi were deducted nine points for entering administration. The club did not recover, as at the end of the season, they were relegated to Liga Bet, following a bottom place finish.

== Honours ==
- Liga Gimel:
  - 1964–65, 1993–94, 2002–03
