= F.C. Givat Olga =

F.C Givat Olga
- Full name: Moadon Sport Adi Givat Olga מועדון ספורט עדי גבעת אולגה
- Founded: 1953 as Hapoel Givat Olga; 2009 as F.C. Givat Olga
- Dissolved: 2015
- Ground: Givat Olga Stadium, Hadera
- 2014–15: Liga Alef North, 6th
Home colours	Away colours

F.C. Givat Olga (Hebrew: מועדון ספורט גבעת אולגה), Moadon Sport Givat Olga, lit. Givat Olga Sport Club (or in short Hebrew: מ.ס. גבעת אולגה Mem Samekh Givat Olga, lit. F.C. Givat Olga) was an Israeli football club which represented Givat Olga neighborhood in Hadera.

== History ==
The roots of the club lead back to 1952, when Hakochav Club, which formed at the Agrobank Ma'abara in Hadera, and Hapoel Agrobank, which was named after the Ma'abara, were the base for the foundation of Hapoel Givat Olga.

Hapoel Givat Olga joined the Israeli Football Association in 1953 and started at Liga Dalet, the lowest tier of Israeli football at the time. However, they were quickly promoted to Liga Gimel, and by the 1959–60 season, they were promoted to Liga Bet, where they played most of their football seasons.

Givat Olga had success in the 1970–71 Israel State Cup, after they eliminated Hapoel Tiberias, which played in Liga Alef (second tier at the time), beating them 3–1 in away match. In the sixth round they held top flight club, Hapoel Petah Tikva to an extra time, where they lost 1–5.

Givat Olga finally won Liga Bet at the 1977–78 season, and played five seasons in Liga Alef (now as third tier), from 1978 to 1983. The feat repeated after the club won Liga Bet again at the 1990–91 season, and once more, played five seasons in Liga Alef, from 1991 to 1996. following relegation from Liga Alef to Liga Bet, the club suffered subsequent relegation, from Liga Bet to Liga Gimel.

While playing in Liga Gimel, the club merged in 2005 with another club from Hadera, Hapoel Nahliel, and for one season, the club was called Hapoel Givat Olga-Nahliel. In 2006, All the football clubs from Hadera merged with Hapoel Hadera into one club called Hapoel Ironi Eran Hadera. as of currently, the merged club is still officially known as Hapoel Eran Hadera-Givat Olga. However, Hapoel Givat Olga ceased to exist as independent club.

In 2009, the successor club reformed under the name of F.C. Givat Olga, and in its first season, won Liga Gimel Samaria division and promoted to Liga Bet. In the following season, they finished runners-up in Liga Bet North B division, and after four successful promotion play-offs matches against Hapoel Isfiya, Hapoel Migdal HaEmek, Ironi Bnei Kabul and Ironi Sayid Umm al-Fahm, won promotion to Liga Alef, where they played four seasons.

On 9 September 2015, F.C. Givat Olga ceased to exist, following a merger with city rivals, Hapoel Hadera.

== Honours ==
=== League ===
Honour	No.	Years
Fourth tier	2	1977–78^{1}, 1990–91^{1}
Fifth tier	1	2009–10

^{1}As Hapoel Givat Olga

=== Cup competitions ===
Honour	No.	Years
Liga Bet North B Division Cup	1	2010–11
