= Ilut Stadium =

Football stadium in Ilut, Israel

Coordinates: 32°43′15.25″N 35°15′56.77″E

- Interactive map of Ilut Stadium
- Location: Ilut, Israel
- Capacity: 4,932

Tenants
- Maccabi Ahi Nazareth; Hapoel Acre (2010-2011); F.C. al-Nahda Nazareth; Hapoel al-Ittihad Nazareth F.C.

The Ilut Stadium is a football stadium in Ilut, located near Nazareth in northern Israel. The stadium is the home ground of Maccabi Ahi Nazareth.

Bnei Sakhnin, Hapoel Acre and Hapoel Nazareth Illit have all played at the ground whilst their stadiums were being upgraded.
