= Ihud Bnei Kafr Qara F.C. =

Israeli football club

Ihud Bnei Kafr Qara
- Full name: Ihud Bnei Kafr Qara Football Club איחוד בני כפר קרע
- Founded: 2014
- Ground: Kafr Qara Ground, Kafr Qara
- Chairman: Samir Masrawa
- Manager: Hana Farhoud
- League: Liga Bet North B
- 2023–24: Liga Bet North B, 4th
Home colours	Away colours

Ihud Bnei Kafr Qara (Hebrew: איחוד בני כפר קרע), (Arabic: اتحاد أبناء كفرقرع) is an Israeli football club based in Kafr Qara. The club is the result of the merger of two local rivals, Hapoel Kafr Qara and Maccabi Kafr Qara. They are currently in Liga Bet North B division.

== History ==
The club was founded in 2014 as the result of the merger of Hapoel Kafr Qara, which finished the 2013–14 season in the eighth place of Liga Gimel Jezreel division, and Maccabi Kafr Qara, which finished the 2013–14 season in the fifth place of Liga Bet North B division. The merged club inherited Maccabi's spot in Liga Bet.

=== Hapoel Kafr Qara ===
The club was founded in 1964 and joined Liga Gimel. The club reached Liga Bet, the third tier of Israeli football league system at the time, in the 1975–76 season. However, at the end of that season, Liga Artzit was created as the new second tier and Liga Bet was demoted to the fourth tier. The club continued to play in Liga Bet until relegation to Liga Gimel at the end of the 1984–85 season and continued to play at the lower tiers of Israeli football.

=== Maccabi Kafr Qara ===
The club, which was also known as Maccabi Kafr Qara Ironi, was founded in 1982 and joined Liga Dalet. The club reached Liga Bet, the fifth tier of Israeli football league system at the time, in the 2001–02 season. In the 2007–08 season, the club won Liga Bet North B division and was promoted to Liga Alef. In the 2009–10 season, Liga Alef became the third tier of Israeli football, following the closure of Liga Artzit. In that season, the club reached its best placing ever, which was sixth in Liga Alef North division. However, in the following season, the club finished second bottom and relegated to Liga Bet.

=== After the merger ===
The club finished its first season as a merged club in the seventh place of Liga Bet North B division.
