= Maccabi Kafr Kanna F.C. =

Maccabi Kafr Kanna
- Full name: Maccabi Kafr Kanna Football Club
- Founded: 1972; 2014 (as Tzeirei Kafr Kanna)
- Ground: Azmi Nassar Stadium, Kafr Kanna
- Capacity: 2,500
- Manager: Hisham Zuabi
- League: Liga Alef North
- 2024–25: Liga Alef North, 16th of 16 (relegated)
Home colours	Away colours

Maccabi Kafr Kanna (Hebrew: מכבי כפר כנא) is an Israeli football club based in Kafr Kanna. The club played its home matches at the Azmi Nassar Stadium, named after Azmi Nassar. After dissolved in 2014 established re-new as "Tzeirei Kafr Kanna".

== History ==
The club was founded in 1970 and started in Liga Dalet, then the fifth and lowest tier of Israeli football. The club played in the lower tiers of Israeli football until they started a progress in the 1990s, after they won Liga Bet North A division in the 1994–95 season and won Liga Alef North division in the 1995–96 season. thus, they achieved two successive promotions and reached Liga Artzit, then the second division. They were relegated back to the third tier at the end of the 1998–99 season, and narrowly missed a second straight relegation when finishing third from bottom in 1999–2000. The following season the club returned to the second tier (now named Liga Leumit) when they finished as runners-up in Liga Artzit, and would have won the title had it not been for two points being deducted for player violence and a violation of the budget rules. In the same season, they also won the Liga Artzit Toto Cup.

In 2002–03 Kafr Kanna were relegated back to Liga Artzit, where they have remained until their relegation to Liga Alef in the end of the 2008–09 season.

In 2013–14, the club finished 15th in Liga Alef North, and relegated to Liga Bet. The club dissolved at the summer of 2014 and did not enter Liga Bet for the 2014–15 season. Instead, a new club, F.C. Tzeirei Kafr Kanna, was founded in the town. However, according to their founder, Tarik Abbas, they are not related to Maccabi Kafr Kanna.

The club's best achievement in the Israel State Cup came in 2002–03, when progressed to the quarter-finals, where they were hammered 0–7 by Maccabi Haifa.

=== F.C. Tzeirei Kafr Kanna ===
The club was founded in the summer of 2014, after Maccabi Kafr Kanna, which in its prime played in the second tier of Israeli football, dissolved following relegation from Liga Alef to Liga Bet in the previous season and due to deep debts. However, according to the club founder, Tarik Abbas, there is no relation between the clubs.

The club finished their first season on top of Liga Gimel Lower Galilee division and won promotion to Liga Bet. In the following season, the club finished on top of Liga Bet North A division and made their second successive promotion within two seasons, this time to Liga Alef, the third tier of Israeli football.

== Honours ==
=== League ===
Honour	No.	Years
Fourth tier	1	2015–16
Fifth tier	1	2014–15
