= 2009–10 Israel State Cup =

Tournament details
- Country: Israel

Final positions
- Champions: Hapoel Tel Aviv (13th title)
- Runners-up: Bnei Yehuda

Tournament statistics
- Matches played: 166
- Goals scored: 584 (3.52 per match)

The 2009–10 Israel State Cup (Hebrew: גביע המדינה, Gvia HaMedina) was the 71st season of Israel's nationwide football cup competition and the 56th after the Israeli Declaration of Independence. It started on 4 September 2009, while the final was held in Ramat Gan Stadium on 11 May 2010.

The competition was won by Hapoel Tel Aviv, who had beaten Bnei Yehuda 3–1 in the final.

As Hapoel Tel Aviv won the double, Bnei Yehuda qualified to the 2010–11 UEFA Europa League, entering in the first qualifying round.

== Calendar ==
Round	Date
First Round	September 4 to 8 and 29, 2009
Second Round	September 11 to 15, 2009
Third Round	October 6 and 10, 2009
Fourth Round	October 27, 2009
Fifth Round	September 25 to 26, 2009
Sixth Round	November 23 to 30, 2009
Seventh Round	January 5 and 8, 2010
Eighth Round	February 8 to 10, 2010
Round of 16	March 23 and 24, 2010
Quarter-finals	April 13 and 14, 2010
Semi-finals	May 4, 2010
Final	May 11, 2010

== Results ==
=== First round ===
Games were played from September 4 to 8 and on September 29, 2009.

Clubs participating in the Liga Bet and Liga Gimel gain entry in this round.

Home team	Score	Away team	League
Beitar Giv'at Ze'ev	0–1	Beitar Ironi Ma'ale Adumim	Bet South B
Maccabi Neve Sha'anan Eldad	3–3 (aet, p. 5–6)	Ironi Nesher	Gimel Shomron
Beitar Ramat Gan	1–5	Hapoel Bik'at HaYarden	Bet South A
Hapoel Neve Golan	1–2	F.C. Roei Heshbon Tel Aviv	Gimel Tel Aviv
Hapoel Kiryat Ono	2–1	Hapoel F.C. Ortodoxim Jaffa	Bet South A
F.C. Bnei Jaffa	2–1	F.C. Kafr Qasim	Bet South A
Beitar Petah Tikva	0–2	Hapoel Azor	Bet South A
Maccabi HaSharon Netanya	0–2	Shikun Vatikim Ramat Gan	Bet South A
F.C. Shikun HaMizrah	3–0	Maccabi Be'er Ya'akov	Bet South B
Maccabi Sha'arayim	1–6	Ironi Ramla	Bet South B
Hapoel Merhavim	6–1	Hapoel Rahat	Bet South B
Maccabi Ironi Or Yehuda	0–4	Ironi Beit Dagan	Gimel Central
Hapoel Mahane Yehuda	3–0	Hapoel Pardesiya Noam	Bet South A
Otzma F.C. Holon	0–3	Maccabi Kabilio Jaffa	Bet South A
Ahi Acre	4–2	Beitar Nahariya	Bet North A
Hapoel Migdal HaEmek	0–3	Maccabi Beit She'an Nissim	Bet North B
Ihud Bnei Baqa	5–3	Hapoel Ironi Ar'ara	Bet North B
Hapoel Ramat Yisrael	0–1	F.C. Ironi Or Yehuda	Bet South A
Beitar Haifa Ya'akov	3–1	Maccabi Sektzia Ma'alot-Tarshiha	Bet North A
Ihud Bnei Majd al-Krum	3–0	Hapoel Kaukab	Bet North A
Hapoel Ramot Menashe Megiddo	0–1 (aet)	Maccabi Ahi Iksal	Bet North B
Hapoel Ramla	1–9	Hapoel Matzliah	Gimel Central
Hapoel Daliyat al-Karmel	9–1	Hapoel Isfiya	Bet North B

=== Second round ===
Games were played from September 11 to 15, 2009.

Home team	Score	Away team	League
Maccabi Bnei Jaljulia	1–2	F.C. Tel Mond	Gimel Sharon
F.C. Be'er Sheva	2–3	F.C. Kiryat Gat	Bet South B
Hapoel Oranit Ironi	2–0	Beitar Oranit	Gimel Tel Aviv
Maccabi Beit She'an Nissim	0–3	Maccabi Or Akiva	Bet North B
Ironi Nesher	2–0	Beitar Hadera	Gimel Shomron
Hapoel Azor	8–1	Hapoel Bik'at HaYarden	Bet South A
Gadna Tel Aviv Yehuda	3–0	Brit Sport Ma'of	Gimel Tel Aviv
F.C. Bnei Jaffa	1–0	Maccabi HaSharon Netanya	Bet South A
F.C. Tzeirei al-Hoshla	0–7	Ironi Beit Shemesh	Gimel South
Hapoel Kiryat Ono	1–3	Maccabi Kabilio Jaffa	Bet South A
F.C. Mahanayim Ramat Gan	1–0	Elitzur Jaffa Tel Aviv	Gimel Tel Aviv
F.C. Shikun HaMizrah	1–1 (aet, p. 4–2)	Ironi Ramla	Bet South B
Hapoel Merhavim	2–1	Moadon Tzeirei Rahat	Bet South B
Maccabi Ahi Iksal	8–0	Maccabi Ironi Barta'a	Bet North B
Hapoel Katamon Jerusalem	0–2	Hapoel Tel Sheva	Gimel South
Ironi Modi'in	5–1	Maccabi Segev Shalom	Gimel South
Agudat Sport Holon	2–2 (aet, p. 4–2)	F.C. Rishon LeZion	Gimel Central
Bnei Yeechalal Rehovot	8–0	Elitzur Yehud Yotel	Gimel Central
Bnei Yehud	3–2	Hapoel Matzliah	Gimel Central
F.C. Giv'at Olga	9–0	Maccabi Jisr az-Zarqa	Gimel Shomron
Hapoel Ironi Hod HaSharon	4–0	Hapoel Aliyah Kfar Saba	Gimel Sharon
Beitar Nahariya	4–2 (aet)	Ihud Bnei Majd al-Krum	Bet North A
Ihud Bnei Baqa	1–3	Hapoel Beit She'an Mesilot	Bet North B
Hapoel Bnei Hajajre	1–5	F.C. Daburiyya	Gimel Jezreel
Hapoel Mahane Yehuda	1–0	Hapoel Ramat Yisrael	Bet South A
Hapoel Yokneam	2–3 (aet)	Maccabi Daliyat al-Karmel	Gimel Shomron
F.C. Maccabi Nazareth Illit	2–1	F.C. Kfar Kama	Gimel Jezreel
Ahva Tayibe	4–1	F.C. Tira	Gimel Sharon
F.C. Tzeirei Tur'an	4–4 (aet, p. 2–4)	Maccabi Bnei Nahf	Gimel Upper Galilee
Beitar Haifa Ya'akov	0–4	Hapoel Sakhnin	Bet North A
F.C. Roei Heshbon Tel Aviv	3–0	Hapoel Kiryat Shalom	Gimel Tel Aviv
Beitar Ironi Ma'ale Adumim	1–2	Bnei Eilat	Bet South B

=== Third round ===
Games were played from October 6 to 10, 2009.

Home team	Score	Away team	League
Bnei Eilat	5–0	F.C. Kiryat Gat	Bet South B
Hapoel Azor	1–2	Maccabi Kabilio Jaffa	Bet South A
Hapoel Mahane Yehuda	2–3	F.C. Bnei Jaffa	Bet South A
Maccabi Ahi Iksal	2–1	Maccabi Or Akiva	Bet North B
Hapoel Beit She'an Mesilot	0–2	Hapoel Daliyat al-Karmel	Bet North B
Hapoel Sakhnin	1–4 (aet)	Beitar Nahariya	Bet North A
Hapoel Nahariya	1–2	Hapoel Ahva Haifa	Bet North A
Bnei Kabul	3–1	F.C. Bnei Arraba	Gimel Upper Galilee
Maccabi Bnei Nahf	2–3	Hapoel Shefa-'Amr	Gimel Upper Galilee
F.C. Shikun HaMizrah	0–1	Hapoel Merhavim	Bet South B
F.C. Mahanayim Ramat Gan	1–3	F.C. Roei Heshbon Tel Aviv	Gimel Tel Aviv
Hapoel Ironi Hod HaSharon	3–2	F.C. Tel Mond	Gimel Sharon
Beitar Ashkelon	5–1	Hapoel Tel Sheva	Gimel South
Ironi Beit Shemesh	0–0 (aet, p. 3–4)	Ironi Modi'in	Gimel South
Bnei Yehud	2–2 (aet, p. 3–5)	F.C. Rishon LeZion	Gimel Central
Bnei Yeechalal Rehovot	3–1 (aet	Ironi Beit Dagan	Gimel Central
Maccabi Daliyat al-Karmel	1–0 (aet)	F.C. Giv'at Olga	Gimel Shomron
Gadna Tel Aviv Yehuda	2–0	Hapoel Oranit Ironi	Gimel Tel Aviv
F.C. Maccabi Nazareth Illit	1–0	Beitar Afula	Gimel Jezreel
Hapoel Bnei Hajajre	3–2	Hapoel Bnei Nujeidat	Gimel Jezreel
Hapoel Bnei Zemer	1–6	Ironi Nesher	Gimel Shomron
Ahva Tayibe	0–0 (aet, p. 3–0)	F.C. Tzeirei Tayibe	Gimel Sharon

=== Fourth round ===
Games were played on October 27, 2009.

Home team	Score	Away team	League
Bnei Eilat	4–1	Hapoel Merhavim	Bet South B
F.C. Rishon LeZion	1–2	Bnei Yeechalal Rehovot	Gimel Central
Gadna Tel Aviv Yehuda	3–0	F.C. Roei Heshbon Tel Aviv	Gimel Tel Aviv
Maccabi Daliyat al-Karmel	3–1	Ironi Nesher	Gimel Shomron
Bnei Kabul	1–2	Hapoel Shefa-'Amr	Gimel Upper Galilee
Maccabi Kabilio Jaffa	4–1	F.C. Bnei Jaffa	Bet South A
Beitar Nahariya	2–3	Hapoel Ahva Haifa	Bet North A
Maccabi Ahi Iksal	0–3	Hapoel Daliyat al-Karmel	Bet North B
Ahva Tayibe	0–2	Hapoel Ironi Hod HaSharon	Gimel Sharon
F.C. Maccabi Nazareth Illit	8–0	Hapoel Bnei Hajajre	Gimel Jezreel
Beitar Ashkelon	2–0	Ironi Modi'in	Gimel South

=== Fifth round ===
Games were played from September 25 to 26, 2009.

Clubs participating in the Liga Alef gain entry in this round.

Home team	Score	Away team	League
Hapoel Bnei Tamra	1–2	Maccabi Ironi Kiryat Ata	Alef North
Maccabi Umm al-Fahm	3–1	Maccabi Tzur Shalom	Alef North
Maccabi Ironi Jatt	0–1	Maccabi Kafr Kanna	Alef North
Hapoel Bnei Jadeidi	3–0	Hapoel Kafr Kanna	Alef North
Maccabi Tamra	0–1	Hapoel Afula	Alef North
Ironi Sayid Umm al-Fahm	4–1	Maccabi Ironi Tirat HaCarmel	Alef North
Maccabi Ironi Kafr Qara	3–1	Hapoel Asi Gilboa	Alef North
Ironi Tiberias	0–1	F.C. Karmiel Safed	Alef North
Hapoel Tzafririm Holon	0–2	Maccabi Amishav Petah Tikva	Alef South
Hapoel Nahlat Yehuda Rishon LeZion	0–1	Maccabi Ironi Kfar Yona	Alef South
Hapoel Arad	2–0	Maccabi Kiryat Malakhi	Alef South
Beitar Kfar Saba Shlomi	2–1	Hapoel Mevaseret Zion	Alef South
Shimshon Bnei Tayibe	0–1	Maccabi Kiryat Gat	Alef South
Maccabi Ironi Netivot	0–0 (aet, p. 4–1)	Hapoel Ironi Herzliya	Alef South
Maccabi Yavne	1–1 (aet, p. 6–7)	Hapoel Hadera	Alef South
Maccabi HaShikma Hen	2–0	Hapoel Kfar Shalem	Alef South

=== Sixth round ===
Games were played from November 23 to 30, 2009.

Home team	Score	Away team
Hapoel Daliyat al-Karmel	2–1	Maccabi Ironi Kiryat Ata
Maccabi Kafr Kanna	5–0	Beitar Nahariya
Maccabi Daliyat al-Karmel	1–1 (aet, p. 4–2)	Hapoel Bnei Jadeidi
Beitar Kfar Saba Shlomi	4–0	Hapoel Merhavim
Hapoel Afula	4–1	Maccabi Ironi Kafr Qara
Maccabi Umm al-Fahm	1–0	Maccabi Ahi Iksal
Maccabi Amishav Petah Tikva	5–1	F.C. Bnei Jaffa
Maccabi HaShikma Hen	6–0	Beitar Ashkelon
Maccabi Ironi Netivot	2–0	Maccabi Kiryat Gat
Hapoel Arad	1–0	Gadna Tel Aviv Yehuda
Hapoel Ironi Hod HaSharon	1–4	Maccabi Ironi Kfar Yona
Maccabi Kabilio Jaffa	1–1 (aet, p. 4–2)	Bnei Yeechalal Rehovot
Bnei Eilat	0–1	Hapoel Hadera
Hapoel Ahva Haifa	2–3	F.C. Maccabi Nazareth Illit
F.C. Karmiel Safed	5–4 (aet)	Hapoel Shefa-'Amr

=== Seventh round ===
Games were played on January 5 and 8, 2010.

Clubs participating in the Liga Leumit gain entry in this round.

Home team	Score	Away team
Hapoel Bnei Lod	3–1	Maccabi Umm al-Fahm
Hapoel Afula	0–3	Ironi Kiryat Shmona
Beitar Kfar Saba Shlomi	0–0 (aet, p. 5–3)	Maccabi Ironi Kfar Yona
F.C. Maccabi Nazareth Illit	0–7	Ironi Sayid Umm al-Fahm
Ironi Ramat HaSharon	6–1	Maccabi Kafr Kanna
Hapoel Arad	3–1	Maccabi Daliyat al-Karmel
Maccabi Amishav Petah Tikva	0–1	F.C. Karmiel Safed
Maccabi Herzliya	0–2	Maccabi Be'er Sheva
Hakoah Amidar Ramat Gan	4–1	Hapoel Jerusalem
Hapoel Marmorek	2–1	Hapoel Rishon LeZion
Beitar Shimshon Tel Aviv	0–1	Maccabi Ironi Netivot
Hapoel Ashkelon	2–1 (aet)	Maccabi HaShikma Hen
Sektzia Nes Tziona	3–1	Ironi Bat Yam
Hapoel Nazareth Illit	4–2	Hapoel Daliyat al-Karmel
Hapoel Kfar Saba	1–0	Ahva Arraba
Hapoel Hadera	1–2	Maccabi Kabilio Jaffa

=== Eighth round ===
Games were played from February 8 to 10, 2010.

Clubs participating in the Israeli Premier League gain entry in this round.

Home team	Score	Away team
Hapoel Marmorek	0–2	Hapoel Bnei Lod
Ironi Kiryat Shmona	0–1	Maccabi Kabilio Jaffa
F.C. Karmiel Safed	0–1	Hapoel Ramat Gan
Hapoel Arad	1–1 (aet, p. 4–5)	Hapoel Nazareth Illit
Ironi Sayid Umm al-Fahm	0–2 (aet)	Bnei Sakhnin
Hapoel Be'er Sheva	1–0	Maccabi Ironi Netivot
Beitar Kfar Saba Shlomi	0–1	Ironi Ramat HaSharon
Maccabi Petah Tikva	5–1	Maccabi Ahi Nazareth
Maccabi Haifa	5–0	Hapoel Kfar Saba
Maccabi Tel Aviv	3–1	Maccabi Netanya
Hapoel Ashkelon	2–1	Sektzia Nes Tziona
Hakoah Ramat Gan	0–1	F.C. Ashdod
Bnei Yehuda	2–0	Hapoel Acre
Hapoel Petah Tikva	1–1 (aet, p. 8–7)	Hapoel Ra'anana
Maccabi Be'er Sheva	1–4	Beitar Jerusalem
Hapoel Haifa	0–3	Hapoel Tel Aviv

=== Round of 16 to the Final ===
Games were played from March 23 to May 11, 2010.

Round of 16
March 23, 2010
Maccabi Kabilio Jaffa	0
Hapoel Tel Aviv	5
March 24, 2010
Beitar Jerusalem	1 (9)
Maccabi Tel Aviv	1 (8)
March 24, 2010
Ironi Ramat HaSharon	3
Hapoel Be'er Sheva	1
March 23, 2010
Hapoel Bnei Lod	1
Maccabi Petah Tikva	3
March 24, 2010
Hapoel Ramat Gan	2 (aet)
Maccabi Haifa	1
March 23, 2010
Bnei Yehuda	1
Hapoel Ashkelon	0
March 24, 2010
F.C. Ashdod	2
Bnei Sakhnin	1
March 23, 2010
Hapoel Petah Tikva	0 (0)
Hapoel Nazareth Illit	0 (3)

Quarter-finals
April 13, 2010
Hapoel Tel Aviv	2
Beitar Jerusalem	0
April 13, 2010
Ironi Ramat HaSharon	2
Maccabi Petah Tikva	1
April 14, 2010
Hapoel Ramat Gan	0
Bnei Yehuda	1
April 14, 2010
F.C. Ashdod	3
Hapoel Nazareth Illit	0

Semi-finals
May 4, 2010
Hapoel Tel Aviv	3
Ironi Ramat HaSharon	1
May 4, 2010
Bnei Yehuda	1 (4)
F.C. Ashdod	1 (3)

Final
May 11, 2010
Hapoel Tel Aviv	3
Bnei Yehuda	1

=== Final ===
May 11, 2010
20:30 UTC+3

Hapoel Tel Aviv	3 – 1	Bnei Yehuda
Vermuth 25', 74'; Enyeama 45' (pen.)	Report	da Silva 38' (o.g.); Aiyenugba (red card) 43'

Ramat Gan Stadium, Ramat Gan
Attendance: 34,442
Referee: Eitan Tabrizi
