= 2005–06 Liga Alef =

Israeli football season

The 2005–06 Liga Alef season saw Hapoel Bnei Tamra (champions of the North Division) and Sektzia Nes Tziona (champions of the South Division) winning the title and promotion to 2006–07.

At the bottom, Hapoel Beit She'an, Maccabi Shefa-'Amr (from North division), F.C. Kafr Qasim and Beitar Giv'at Ze'ev (from South division) were all automatically relegated to Liga Bet, while 12th placed teams from each division, Maccabi Tamra and Maccabi Sha'arayim entered a promotion/relegation play-offs, at the end of which both clubs were relegated as well.

== North Division ==
Pos	Team	Pld	W	D	L	GF	GA	GD	Pts	Promotion or relegation
1	Hapoel Bnei Tamra	26	17	6	3	57	24	+33	57	Promoted to Liga Artzit
2	Hapoel Bnei Jadeidi	26	17	5	4	55	23	+32	56	
3	Hapoel Umm al-Fahm	26	14	5	7	47	36	+11	47	
4	Hapoel Asi Gilboa	26	13	6	7	43	25	+18	45	
5	Hapoel Afula	26	12	4	10	41	35	+6	40	
6	Maccabi Sektzia Ma'alot-Tarshiha	26	10	3	13	30	38	−8	33	
7	Maccabi Ironi Shlomi/Nahariya	26	8	8	10	28	39	−11	32	
8	Hapoel Reineh	26	9	4	13	36	37	−1	31	
9	Hapoel Makr	26	8	7	11	31	41	−10	31	
10	Hapoel Kafr Sumei	26	9	4	13	21	38	−17	31	
11	Hapoel Kafr Kanna	26	8	5	13	41	45	−4	29	
12	Maccabi Tamra	26	7	8	11	26	33	−7	29	Relegation play-offs
13	Hapoel Beit She'an	26	7	6	13	28	37	−9	27	Relegated to Liga Bet
14	Maccabi Shefa-'Amr	26	5	5	16	18	51	−33	20	Relegated to Liga Bet

== South Division ==
Pos	Team	Pld	W	D	L	GF	GA	GD	Pts	Promotion or relegation
1	Sektzia Nes Tziona	26	19	3	4	59	22	+37	60	Promoted to Liga Artzit
2	Hapoel Mevaseret Zion	26	15	5	6	43	28	+15	50	
3	Ironi Ofakim	26	13	9	4	46	19	+27	48	
4	Maccabi Ironi Bat Yam	26	12	8	6	51	27	+24	44	
5	A.S. Ramat Eliyahu Hatzrot Jaffa	26	10	5	11	31	47	−16	35	
6	Hapoel Arad	26	9	7	10	31	36	−5	34	
7	Maccabi Yavne	26	8	8	10	25	30	−5	32	
8	Hapoel Nahlat Yehuda	26	9	5	12	24	35	−11	32	
9	Beitar Kiryat Gat	26	9	4	13	31	30	+1	31	Merged with Maccabi Kiryat Gat
10	Maccabi Kiryat Gat	26	8	7	11	32	34	−2	31	
11	Hapoel Kfar Shalem	26	9	4	13	35	39	−4	31	
12	Maccabi Sha'arayim	26	7	10	9	22	29	−7	31	Relegation play-offs
13	F.C. Kafr Qasim	26	8	5	13	33	48	−15	29	Relegated to Liga Bet
14	Beitar Giv'at Ze'ev	26	3	6	17	21	60	−39	15	Relegated to Liga Bet

== Relegation play-offs ==
=== North play-off ===
The 12th placed club in Liga Alef North, Maccabi Tamra, faced Liga Bet North A and North B runners-up, Beitar Haifa and Ironi Sayid Umm al-Fahm. The teams played each other in a round-robin tournament, with all matches held at a neutral venue, Kiryat Eliezer Stadium.

24 May 2006

Ironi Sayid Umm al-Fahm	5 - 1	Maccabi Tamra

27 May 2006

Maccabi Tamra	1 - 6	Beitar Haifa

31 May 2006

Ironi Sayid Umm al-Fahm	2 - 7	Beitar Haifa

Pos	Team	Pld	W	D	L	GF	GA	GD	Pts	Promotion or relegation
1	Beitar Haifa	2	2	0	0	13	3	+10	6	Promoted to Liga Alef
2	Ironi Sayid Umm al-Fahm	2	1	0	1	7	8	−1	3	Remained in Liga Bet
3	Maccabi Tamra	2	0	0	2	2	11	−9	0	Relegated to Liga Bet

Beitar Haifa won the play-offs and was promoted to Liga Alef.

=== South play-off ===
The 12th placed club in Liga Alef South, Maccabi Sha'arayim, faced Liga Bet South A and Liga Bet South B runners-up, Hapoel Azor and Ironi Ramla. The teams played each other in a round-robin tournament, with all matches held at a neutral venue, Bat Yam Municipal Stadium.

24 May 2006

Ironi Ramla	2 - 1	Hapoel Azor
	Report (in Hebrew)

27 May 2006

Maccabi Sha'arayim	2 - 0	Hapoel Azor
	Report (in Hebrew)

31 May 2006

Ironi Ramla	2 - 1	Maccabi Sha'arayim
	Report (in Hebrew)

Pos	Team	Pld	W	D	L	GF	GA	GD	Pts	Promotion or relegation
1	Ironi Ramla	2	2	0	0	4	2	+2	6	Promoted to Liga Alef
2	Maccabi Sha'arayim	2	1	0	1	3	2	+1	3	Relegated to Liga Bet
3	Hapoel Azor	2	0	0	2	1	4	−3	0	Remained in Liga Bet

Ironi Ramla won the play-offs and was promoted to Liga Alef.
