= 2007–08 Liga Alef =

Israeli football season

The 2007–08 Liga Alef season saw Hapoel Umm al-Fahm (champions of the North Division) and Maccabi Ironi Bat Yam (champions of the South Division) winning the title and promotion to Liga Artzit.

At the bottom, the bottom two clubs in each division, Hapoel Ahva Haifa, Hapoel Makr (from North division), Maccabi Ironi Amishav Petah Tikva and Ironi Ofakim (from South division) were all automatically relegated to Liga Bet, whilst the two clubs which were ranked in 12th place in each division, Beitar Haifa and Hapoel Tzafririm Holon entered a promotion/relegation play-offs, and both relegated to Liga Bet after losing the play-offs.

== Changes from last season ==
=== Team changes ===
- Hapoel Bnei Jadeidi and Hapoel Kfar Shalem were promoted to Liga Artzit; Hapoel Herzliya (to North division) and Maccabi Be'er Sheva (to South division) were relegated from Liga Artzit.
- Hapoel Kafr Sumei, Maccabi Sektzia Ma'alot-Tarshiha and Hapoel Reineh were relegated to Liga Bet from North division; Beitar Ihud Mashhad, Ironi Sayid Umm al-Fahm and Ironi Tiberias were promoted to the North division from Liga Bet.
- A.S. Ramat Eliyahu and Hapoel Arad were relegated to Liga Bet from South division; Maccabi Ironi Kfar Yona and Maccabi Ironi Netivot were promoted to the South division from Liga Bet.
- During the summer break Hapoel Maxim Lod, which won the previous season South division, folded. To replace the team, Beitar Kfar Saba, as the best runner-up in the Liga Bet south divisions, was also promoted.

== North Division ==
Pos	Team	Pld	W	D	L	GF	GA	GD	Pts	Promotion or relegation
1	Hapoel Umm al-Fahm	26	20	2	4	55	12	+43	62	Promoted to Liga Artzit
2	Ironi Sayid Umm al-Fahm	26	13	9	4	32	21	+11	48	
3	Hapoel Asi Gilboa	26	14	4	8	34	25	+9	46	
4	Hapoel Herzliya	26	12	6	8	48	25	+23	42	
5	Hapoel Kafr Kanna	26	12	5	9	44	24	+20	41	
6	Beitar Safed	26	10	8	8	28	26	+2	38	
7	Maccabi Tzur Shalom	26	10	7	9	29	24	+5	37	
8	Hapoel Afula	26	10	5	11	32	30	+2	35	
9	Beitar Ihud Mashhad	26	9	7	10	34	33	+1	34	
10	Ironi Tiberias	26	10	4	12	29	32	−3	34	
11	Maccabi Ironi Shlomi/Nahariya	26	9	5	12	41	38	+3	32	
12	Beitar Haifa	26	7	9	10	35	30	+5	30	Relegation play-offs
13	Hapoel Ahva Haifa	26	5	5	16	22	48	−26	20	Relegated to Liga Bet
14	Hapoel Makr	26	1	4	21	9	104	−95	7	Relegated to Liga Bet, folded

== South Division ==
Pos	Team	Pld	W	D	L	GF	GA	GD	Pts	Promotion or relegation
1	Maccabi Ironi Bat Yam	26	17	4	5	56	22	+34	55	Promoted to Liga Artzit
2	Hapoel Mevaseret Zion	26	16	6	4	48	24	+24	54	
3	Maccabi Ironi Kfar Yona	26	13	8	5	42	25	+17	47	
4	Maccabi Be'er Sheva	26	11	8	7	32	20	+12	41	
5	Maccabi Yavne	26	12	4	10	47	34	+13	40	
6	Beitar Kfar Saba	26	11	6	9	45	41	+4	39	
7	Hapoel Nahlat Yehuda	26	10	7	9	29	28	+1	37	
8	Maccabi Kiryat Malakhi	26	9	9	8	38	36	+2	36	
9	Maccabi Ironi Netivot	26	10	5	11	36	44	−8	35	
10	Ironi Ramla	26	10	4	12	35	41	−6	34	
11	Maccabi Kiryat Gat	26	8	6	12	25	30	−5	30	
12	Hapoel Tzafririm Holon	26	7	8	11	28	34	−6	29	Relegation play-offs
13	Maccabi Ironi Amishav Petah Tikva	26	4	6	16	23	56	−33	18	Relegated to Liga Bet
14	Ironi Ofakim	26	0	7	19	14	63	−49	7	Relegated to Liga Bet, folded

== Relegation play-offs ==
=== North play-off ===
The 12th placed club in Liga Alef North, Beitar Haifa, faced Liga Bet North B runners-up, Maccabi Tamra in a two legged play-off. The Liga Bet North A runners-up, Hapoel Iksal was suspended from the play-offs, following an attempt for match fixing, prior to their scheduled match against Beitar Haifa.

Beitar Haifa	1 - 1	Maccabi Tamra

Maccabi Tamra	3 - 1 (a.e.t.)	Beitar Haifa

Maccabi Tamra won 4-2 on aggregate and was promoted to Liga Alef.

=== South play-off ===
The 12th placed club in Liga Alef South, Hapoel Tzafririm Holon, faced the Liga Bet South A and Liga Bet South B runners-up, Hapoel Mahane Yehuda and Hapoel Arad. The teams faced each other in a round-robin tournament.

Hapoel Arad	2 - 1	Hapoel Mahane Yehuda

Hapoel Tzafririm Holon	2 - 0	Hapoel Mahane Yehuda

Hapoel Arad	4 - 1	Hapoel Tzafririm Holon

Pos	Team	Pld	W	D	L	GF	GA	GD	Pts	Promotion or relegation
1	Hapoel Arad	2	2	0	0	6	2	+4	6	Promoted to Liga Alef
2	Hapoel Tzafririm Holon	2	1	0	1	3	4	−1	3	Relegated to Liga Bet
3	Hapoel Mahane Yehuda	2	0	0	2	1	4	−3	0	Remained in Liga Bet

Hapoel Arad won the play-offs and was promoted to Liga Alef.
