= 2004–05 Liga Bet =

Israeli football season

The 2004–05 Liga Bet season saw Maccabi Sektzia Ma'alot (champions of the North A division), Hapoel Bnei Tamra (champions of the North B division), Maccabi Ironi Bat Yam (champions of the South A division) and Hapoel Arad (champions of the South B division) win their regional divisions and promoted to Liga Alef.

The runners-up in each division entered a promotion/relegation play-offs with the clubs ranked 12th in Liga Alef. In the north section, Hapoel Umm al-Fahm (from North B division) won the play-offs and was promoted. In the south section, Ironi Nes Tziona (from South B division) won the play-offs and was promoted.

At the bottom, Beitar Acre (from North A division) and Maccabi Bnei Tira (from South A division) were relegated to Liga Gimel, whilst Maccabi Majd al-Krum (from North A division) and Beitar Kiryat Ono (from South A division) folded during the season. However, Maccabi Daliyat al-Karmel, Hapoel Kafr Misr/Nein (from North B division) (from North B division), Moadon Tzeirei Rahat and Maccabi Yehud (from South B division), which finished in the relegation zone, were all reprieved from relegation, after several vacancies were created in Liga Bet for the 2005–06 season, mostly due to withdrawals of clubs.

== North A Division ==
Pos	Team	Pld	W	D	L	GF	GA	GD	Pts	Promotion or relegation
1	Maccabi Sektzia Ma'alot	28	22	5	1	76	20	+56	71	Promoted to Liga Alef
2	Hapoel Karmiel	28	18	8	2	64	22	+42	62	Promotion play-offs
3	Beitar Haifa	28	18	5	5	72	25	+47	59	
4	Beitar Safed	28	17	8	3	76	37	+39	59	
5	Hapoel Sakhnin	28	17	6	5	67	36	+31	57	
6	Hapoel Bnei Manda	28	12	5	11	50	48	+2	41	Withdrew
7	Ironi I'billin	28	10	8	10	48	46	+2	38	
8	Hapoel Yanuh	28	10	3	15	48	67	−19	33	
9	Hapoel Deir Hanna	28	10	6	12	44	47	−3	33 (Note: Three points deducted)	
10	Beitar Kafr Kanna	28	9	5	14	50	68	−18	32	
11	Bnei Abu Snan	28	7	10	11	45	47	−2	29 (Note: Two points deducted)	
12	Hapoel Peki'in	28	5	7	16	40	67	−27	22	Withdrew
13	Ironi Nahariya	28	6	3	19	32	85	−53	21	Merged with Ironi Shlomi
14	Beitar Julis	28	3	7	18	38	80	−42	14	Withdrew
15	Beitar Acre	28	2	2	24	24	79	−55	8	Relegated to Liga Gimel

Notes:

During the season, Maccabi Majd al-Krum (after 11 matches) folded and its results were annulled.

== North B Division ==
Pos	Team	Pld	W	D	L	GF	GA	GD	Pts	Promotion or qualification
1	Hapoel Bnei Tamra	30	22	2	6	67	26	+41	68	Promoted to Liga Alef
2	Hapoel Umm al-Fahm	30	20	6	4	86	25	+61	66	Promotion play-offs
3	Hapoel Tel Hanan	30	19	7	4	70	28	+42	64	
4	Hapoel Ahva Haifa	30	16	5	9	61	46	+15	53	
5	Maccabi Kafr Qara	30	16	6	8	53	41	+12	52 (Note: Two points deducted)	
6	Maccabi Or Akiva	30	11	8	11	41	36	+5	41	
7	Hapoel Daliyat al-Karmel	30	10	11	9	37	40	−3	41	
8	Hapoel Iksal	30	10	9	11	47	54	−7	39	
9	Hapoel Migdal HaEmek	30	11	9	10	48	48	0	39 (Note: Three points deducted)	
10	Hapoel Yokneam	30	11	6	13	56	46	+10	39	
11	Hapoel Mo'atza Ezorit Galil Tahton	30	10	7	13	49	43	+6	37	
12	Ironi Sayid Umm al-Fahm	30	10	4	16	56	61	−5	34	
13	Hapoel Yafa	30	8	8	14	49	65	−16	32	Withdrew
14	Hapoel Ar'ara	30	8	7	15	37	57	−20	31	
15	Maccabi Daliyat al-Karmel	30	6	5	19	31	80	−49	23	Reprieved from relegation
16	Hapoel Kafr Misr/Nein	30	2	0	28	17	109	−92	6	Reprieved from relegation

== South A Division ==
Pos	Team	Pld	W	D	L	GF	GA	GD	Pts	Promotion or relegation
1	Maccabi Ironi Bat Yam	28	21	5	2	90	23	+67	68	Promoted to Liga Alef
2	Hapoel Azor	28	20	5	3	65	26	+39	65	Promotion play-offs
3	Maccabi Ironi Kfar Yona	28	16	5	7	67	23	+44	53	
4	Beitar Kfar Saba	28	13	10	5	43	32	+11	49	
5	Hapoel Hod HaSharon	28	15	2	11	64	28	+36	47	
6	Beitar Ramat Gan	28	13	7	8	50	30	+20	46	
7	Hapoel Or Yehuda	28	13	7	8	54	38	+16	46	Withdrew
8	Hapoel Kiryat Ono	28	12	7	9	37	22	+15	43	
9	Hapoel Mahane Yehuda	28	12	4	12	49	41	+8	40	
10	Hapoel Hadera	28	8	12	8	32	36	−4	36	
11	Beitar Jaffa	28	6	7	15	31	61	−30	25	
12	Hapoel Ramat Yisrael	28	6	6	16	38	60	−22	24	
13	Shimshon Bnei Tayibe	28	4	6	18	21	68	−47	18	
14	Otzma Holon	28	2	8	18	22	81	−59	14	
15	Maccabi Bnei Tira	28	3	1	24	15	109	−94	10	Relegated to Liga Gimel

During the season, Beitar Kiryat Ono (after 13 matches) folded and its results were annulled.

== South B Division ==
Pos	Team	Pld	W	D	L	GF	GA	GD	Pts	Promotion or qualification
1	Hapoel Arad	30	22	7	1	76	14	+62	73	Promoted to Liga Alef
2	Ironi Nes Tziona (Note: Maccabi Ben Zvi became Ironi Nes Tziona.)	30	21	3	6	73	29	+44	66	Promotion play-offs
3	Maccabi Kiryat Malakhi	30	21	2	7	68	39	+29	65	
4	Maccabi Ironi Sderot	30	13	13	4	58	36	+22	52	
5	Maccabi Jerusalem/Ma'ale Adumim	30	16	3	11	64	54	+10	51	Withdrew
6	Hapoel Merhavim	30	14	5	11	40	42	−2	47	
7	Hapoel Yeruham	30	13	5	12	55	45	+10	44	Withdrew
8	A.S. Eilat	30	10	8	12	52	46	+6	38	Withdrew
9	Maccabi Ironi Netivot	30	11	5	14	46	45	+1	38	
10	Hapoel Oranit	30	10	7	13	43	59	−16	37	
11	Maccabi Kiryat Ekron	30	7	10	13	36	54	−18	31	
12	Hapoel Bnei Lakhish	30	7	8	15	43	64	−21	29	
13	Ironi Ramla	30	8	3	19	40	64	−24	27	
14	Hapoel Tirat Shalom	30	8	3	19	46	86	−40	27	
15	Moadon Tzeirei Rahat	30	6	11	13	36	48	−12	25 (Note: Four points deducted)	Reprieved from relegation
16	Maccabi Yehud	30	3	7	20	17	68	−51	16	Reprieved from relegation

== Promotion play-offs ==
=== North play-off ===
Liga Bet North A and North B runners-up, Hapoel Karmiel and Hapoel Umm al-Fahm faced the 12th placed club in Liga Alef North, Maccabi Shefa-'Amr. The teams played each other in a round-robin tournament, with all matches held at a neutral venue, Nahariya Municipal Stadium.

20 May 2005

Hapoel Umm al-Fahm	1 - 1	Hapoel Karmiel
	Report (in Hebrew)

24 May 2005

Hapoel Karmiel	0 - 3	Maccabi Shefa-'Amr
	Report (in Hebrew)

28 May 2005

Maccabi Shefa-'Amr	0 - 1	Hapoel Umm al-Fahm
	Report (in Hebrew)

Pos	Team	Pld	W	D	L	GF	GA	GD	Pts	Promotion or qualification
1	Hapoel Umm al-Fahm	2	1	1	0	2	1	+1	4	Promoted to Liga Alef
2	Maccabi Shefa-'Amr	2	1	0	1	3	1	+2	3	Remained in Liga Alef
2	Hapoel Karmiel	2	0	1	1	1	4	−3	1	Remained in Liga Bet

Hapoel Umm al-Fahm won the play-offs and was promoted to Liga Alef. Maccabi Shefa-'Amr remained in Liga Alef after Hapoel Majd al-Krum (which relegated from Liga Artzit to Liga Alef) folded during the summer.

=== South play-off ===
Liga Bet South A and Liga Bet South B runners-up, Hapoel Azor and Ironi Nes Tziona faced the 12th placed club in Liga Alef South, Beitar Giv'at Ze'ev. The teams played each other in a round-robin tournament, with all matches held at a neutral venue, Bat Yam Municipal Stadium.

20 May 2005

Ironi Nes Tziona	3 - 1	Hapoel Azor
	Report (in Hebrew)

24 May 2005

Beitar Giv'at Ze'ev	1 - 1	Hapoel Azor
	Report (in Hebrew)

27 May 2005

Ironi Nes Tziona	1 - 0	Beitar Giv'at Ze'ev
	Report (in Hebrew)

Pos	Team	Pld	W	D	L	GF	GA	GD	Pts	Promotion or qualification
1	Ironi Nes Tziona	2	2	0	0	4	1	+3	6	Promoted to Liga Alef
2	Beitar Giv'at Ze'ev	2	0	1	1	1	2	−1	1	Remained in Liga Alef
2	Hapoel Azor	2	0	1	1	2	4	−2	1	Remained in Liga Bet

Ironi Nes Tziona won the play-offs and was promoted to Liga Alef. Beitar Giv'at Ze'ev remained in Liga Alef after a vacancy was created in the South division, following the merger of Liga Artzit club, Maccabi Ramat Amidar, with Hakoah Ramat Gan.
