= 1966–68 Liga Gimel =

Israeli football season

The 1966–68 Liga Gimel season saw 192 clubs competing in 16 regional divisions for promotion to Liga Bet.

Beitar Tiberias, Hapoel Jadeidi, Maccabi Afula, Hapoel Shefa-'Amr, Hapoel Kiryat Yam, Maccabi Neve Sha'anan, Beitar Binyamina, Hapoel Tel Mond, Hapoel Kafr Qasim, Hapoel Ramat HaSharon, Maccabi Ramat HaShikma, Beitar Rehovot, Maccabi Dror Lod, Maccabi Ashdod, Maccabi Yavne and Maccabi Be'er Sheva won their regional divisions and qualified for the Promotion play-offs.

At the Promotion play-offs, Maccabi Neve Sha'anan, Beitar Tiberias, Hapoel Shefa-'Amr and Hapoel Kiryat Yam were promoted to Liga Bet from the North play-offs, whilst Beitar Rehovot, Hapoel Ramat HaSharon, Maccabi Be'er Sheva and Maccabi Dror Lod were promoted to Liga Bet from the South play-offs.

== Upper Galilee Division ==
| Pos | Team | Pld | W | D | L | GF | GA | GD | Pts | Qualification |
|---|---|---|---|---|---|---|---|---|---|---|
| 1 | Beitar Tiberias | 44 | – | – | – | 149 | 35 | +114 | 74 | Promotion play-offs |
| 2 | Hapoel Hatzor | 44 | – | – | – | 136 | 44 | +92 | 70 | |
| 3 | Hapoel Ayelet HaShahar | 44 | – | – | – | 143 | 67 | +76 | 63 | |
| 4 | Hapoel Dan | 44 | – | – | – | 115 | 63 | +52 | 59 | |
| 5 | Hapoel Kfar HaNassi | 44 | – | – | – | 125 | 104 | +21 | 47 | |
| 6 | Hapoel Yir'on | 44 | – | – | – | 98 | 98 | 0 | 46 | |
| 7 | Hapoel Neot Mordechai | 44 | – | – | – | 108 | 110 | −2 | 45 | |
| 8 | Hapoel Kfar Giladi | 44 | – | – | – | 87 | 87 | 0 | 44 | |
| 9 | Beitar Hatzor | 44 | – | – | – | 69 | 120 | −51 | 28 | |
| 10 | Maccabi Rosh Pinna | 44 | – | – | – | 50 | 126 | −76 | 20 | |
| 11 | Hapoel Tiberias Illit | 44 | – | – | – | 34 | 141 | −107 | 17 | |
| 12 | Hapoel Dishon | 44 | – | – | – | 20 | 139 | −119 | 7 | |

== Western Galilee Division ==
| Pos | Team | Pld | W | D | L | GF | GA | GD | Pts | Qualification |
|---|---|---|---|---|---|---|---|---|---|---|
| 1 | Hapoel Jadeidi | 44 | – | – | – | 126 | 37 | +89 | 73 | Promotion play-offs |
| 2 | Al Ahly Majd al-Krum | 44 | – | – | – | 108 | 23 | +85 | 72 | |
| 3 | Hapoel Majd al-Krum | 44 | – | – | – | 89 | 45 | +44 | 56 | |
| 4 | Hapoel Abu Snan | 44 | – | – | – | 85 | 60 | +25 | 53 | |
| 5 | Hapoel Kafr Yasif | 44 | – | – | – | 108 | 44 | +64 | 52 | |
| 6 | Bnei Tamra | 44 | – | – | – | 110 | 53 | +57 | 51 | |
| 7 | Hapoel Ma'alot | 44 | – | – | – | 71 | 74 | −3 | 38 | |
| 8 | Hapoel Sakhnin | 44 | – | – | – | 74 | 102 | −28 | 30 | |
| 9 | Maccabi Tamra | 44 | – | – | – | 54 | 105 | −51 | 30 | |
| 10 | Hapoel Shlomi | 44 | – | – | – | 54 | 90 | −36 | 27 | |
| 11 | Hapoel Mi'ilya | 44 | – | – | – | 25 | 150 | −125 | 16 | |
| 12 | Hapoel Kabul | 44 | – | – | – | 14 | 180 | −166 | 4 | |

== Valleys Division ==
| Pos | Team | Pld | W | D | L | GF | GA | GD | Pts | Qualification |
|---|---|---|---|---|---|---|---|---|---|---|
| 1 | Maccabi Afula | 48 | – | – | – | 193 | 47 | +146 | 80 | Promotion play-offs |
| 2 | Beitar Beit She'an | 48 | – | – | – | 118 | 59 | +59 | 68 | |
| 3 | Hapoel Beit HaShita | 48 | – | – | – | 166 | 84 | +82 | 67 | |
| 4 | Hapoel Kfar Kama | 48 | – | – | – | 155 | 71 | +84 | 58 | |
| 5 | Hapoel Geva | 48 | – | – | – | 110 | 87 | +23 | 58 | |
| 6 | Hapoel Mesilot | 48 | – | – | – | 109 | 100 | +9 | 50 | |
| 7 | Hapoel Hever | 48 | – | – | – | 82 | 94 | −12 | 45 | |
| 8 | Hapoel Tel Yosef | 48 | – | – | – | 103 | 116 | −13 | 43 | |
| 9 | Hapoel Yardena | 48 | – | – | – | 68 | 84 | −16 | 40 | |
| 10 | Maccabi Beit She'an | 48 | – | – | – | 60 | 108 | −48 | 32 | |
| 11 | Beitar Afula | 48 | – | – | – | 49 | 132 | −83 | 25 | |
| 12 | Hapoel Menahemia | 48 | – | – | – | 56 | 171 | −115 | 24 | |
| 13 | Hapoel Vatikei Balfouria | 48 | – | – | – | 34 | 150 | −116 | 17 | |

== Nazareth Division ==
| Pos | Team | Pld | W | D | L | GF | GA | GD | Pts | Qualification |
|---|---|---|---|---|---|---|---|---|---|---|
| 1 | Hapoel Shefa-'Amr | 52 | – | – | – | 117 | 26 | +91 | 93 | Promotion play-offs |
| 2 | Hapoel Kiryat Nazareth | 52 | – | – | – | 170 | 66 | +104 | 73 | |
| 3 | Al Ahly Nazareth | 52 | – | – | – | 148 | 69 | +79 | 72 | |
| 4 | Hapoel Kiryat Tiv'on | 52 | – | – | – | 121 | 71 | +50 | 65 | |
| 5 | HaPiryon Shefa-'Amr | 52 | – | – | – | 119 | 76 | +43 | 61 | |
| 6 | Al-Salam Nazareth | 52 | – | – | – | 89 | 95 | −6 | 51 | |
| 7 | Beitar al-Amal Nazareth | 52 | – | – | – | 91 | 94 | −3 | 49 | |
| 8 | Hapoel Ein Mahil | 52 | – | – | – | 68 | 106 | −38 | 41 | |
| 9 | Hapoel Daburiyya | 52 | – | – | – | 69 | 136 | −67 | 40 | |
| 10 | Hapoel Reineh | 52 | – | – | – | 73 | 105 | −32 | 38 | |
| 11 | Hapoel Bnei Iksal | 52 | – | – | – | 56 | 100 | −44 | 38 | |
| 12 | Hapoel Bu'eine | 52 | – | – | – | 48 | 147 | −99 | 33 | |
| 13 | Hapoel Eilabun | 52 | – | – | – | 55 | 134 | −79 | 31 | |
| 14 | Tzeirei HaDruzim | 52 | – | – | – | 52 | 111 | −59 | 26 | |

== Bay Division ==
| Pos | Team | Pld | W | D | L | GF | GA | GD | Pts | Qualification |
|---|---|---|---|---|---|---|---|---|---|---|
| 1 | Hapoel Kiryat Yam | 48 | – | – | – | 170 | 47 | +123 | 81 | Promotion play-offs |
| 2 | Beitar Migdal HaEmek | 48 | – | – | – | 131 | 49 | +82 | 77 | |
| 3 | HaNoar HaOved Acre | 48 | – | – | – | 136 | 55 | +81 | 71 | |
| 4 | Shimshon Nahariya | 48 | – | – | – | 134 | 58 | +76 | 71 | |
| 5 | Beitar Kiryat Binyamin | 48 | – | – | – | 105 | 60 | +45 | 59 | |
| 6 | Hapoel Kiryat Binyamin | 48 | – | – | – | 95 | 62 | +33 | 52 | |
| 7 | Maccabi Nahariya | 48 | – | – | – | 100 | 85 | +15 | 52 | |
| 8 | Hapoel Rekhasim | 48 | – | – | – | 69 | 111 | −42 | 41 | |
| 9 | Al-Amal Acre | 48 | – | – | – | 63 | 81 | −18 | 28 | |
| 10 | Hapoel Ein HaMifratz | 48 | – | – | – | 49 | 89 | −40 | 21 | |
| 11 | Youth Club I'billin | 48 | – | – | – | 32 | 116 | −84 | 13 | |
| 12 | Hapoel Netiv HaShayara | 48 | – | – | – | 32 | 119 | −87 | 13 | |
| 13 | Hapoel I'billin | 48 | – | – | – | 6 | 181 | −175 | 2 | |

== Haifa Division ==
| Pos | Team | Pld | W | D | L | GF | GA | GD | Pts | Qualification |
|---|---|---|---|---|---|---|---|---|---|---|
| 1 | Maccabi Neve Sha'anan | 40 | – | – | – | 136 | 36 | +100 | 65 | Promotion play-offs |
| 2 | Hapoel HaTzair Haifa | 40 | – | – | – | 94 | 55 | +39 | 52 | |
| 3 | Hapoel Geva HaCarmel | 40 | – | – | – | 92 | 52 | +40 | 50 | |
| 4 | Maccabi Fureidis | 40 | – | – | – | 69 | 54 | +15 | 48 | |
| 5 | Rafi Bat Galim | 40 | – | – | – | 96 | 68 | +28 | 46 | |
| 6 | Hapoel Yagur | 40 | – | – | – | 91 | 69 | +22 | 43 | |
| 7 | Beitar Tel Hanan | 40 | – | – | – | 78 | 69 | +9 | 41 | |
| 8 | Hapoel Ahva Haifa | 40 | – | – | – | 75 | 82 | −7 | 31 | |
| 9 | Maccabi Tel Hanan | 40 | – | – | – | 51 | 139 | −88 | 20 | |
| 10 | Beitar Zikhron Ya'akov | 40 | – | – | – | 37 | 121 | −84 | 17 | |
| 11 | Hapoel Tzrufa | 40 | – | – | – | 51 | 125 | −74 | 16 | |

== Samaria Division ==
| Pos | Team | Pld | W | D | L | GF | GA | GD | Pts | Qualification |
|---|---|---|---|---|---|---|---|---|---|---|
| 1 | Beitar Binyamina | 44 | – | – | – | 165 | 28 | +137 | 83 | Promotion play-offs |
| 2 | Hapoel Beit Yitzhak | 44 | – | – | – | 139 | 61 | +78 | 61 | |
| 3 | Hapoel Elyakhin | 44 | – | – | – | 103 | 47 | +56 | 57 | |
| 4 | Hapoel 'Ara | 44 | – | – | – | 89 | 46 | +43 | 56 | |
| 5 | Hapoel Kafr Qara | 44 | – | – | – | 92 | 64 | +28 | 53 | |
| 6 | Beitar Hadera | 44 | – | – | – | 106 | 68 | +38 | 44 | |
| 7 | Hapoel Umm al-Fahm | 44 | – | – | – | 80 | 102 | −22 | 42 | |
| 8 | Beitar Or Akiva | 44 | – | – | – | 54 | 99 | −45 | 30 | |
| 9 | Maccabi Or Akiva | 44 | – | – | – | 50 | 122 | −72 | 25 | |
| 10 | Hapoel Jisr az-Zarqa | 44 | – | – | – | 46 | 167 | −121 | 24 | |
| 11 | Hapoel Baqa al-Gharbiyye | 44 | – | – | – | 48 | 139 | −91 | 23 | |
| 12 | Hapoel Caesarea | 44 | – | – | – | 72 | 101 | −29 | 22 | |

== Sharon Division ==
| Pos | Team | Pld | W | D | L | GF | GA | GD | Pts | Qualification |
|---|---|---|---|---|---|---|---|---|---|---|
| 1 | Hapoel Tel Mond | 40 | – | – | – | 153 | 45 | +108 | 68 | Promotion play-offs |
| 2 | Hapoel Tayibe | 40 | – | – | – | 123 | 39 | +84 | 62 | |
| 3 | Maccabi Amidar Netanya | 40 | – | – | – | 109 | 59 | +50 | 55 | |
| 4 | Hapoel Kadima | 40 | – | – | – | 102 | 58 | +44 | 52 | |
| 5 | Maccabi HaSharon Netanya | 40 | – | – | – | 74 | 65 | +9 | 40 | |
| 6 | Hapoel Ein HaTchelet | 40 | – | – | – | 87 | 80 | +7 | 40 | |
| 7 | Hapoel Yanuv | 40 | – | – | – | 72 | 80 | −8 | 40 | |
| 8 | Hapoel Kfar Yona | 40 | – | – | – | 64 | 91 | −27 | 30 | |
| 9 | Hapoel Tnuvot | 40 | – | – | – | 61 | 123 | −62 | 19 | |
| 10 | Hapoel Burgata | 40 | – | – | – | 32 | 96 | −64 | 19 | |
| 11 | Maccabi Kfar Yona | 40 | – | – | – | 31 | 172 | −141 | 13 | |

== Petah Tikva Division ==
| Pos | Team | Pld | W | D | L | GF | GA | GD | Pts | Qualification |
|---|---|---|---|---|---|---|---|---|---|---|
| 1 | Hapoel Kafr Qasim | 48 | – | – | – | 155 | 27 | +128 | 86 | Promotion play-offs |
| 2 | Beitar Herzliya | 48 | – | – | – | 110 | 47 | +63 | 68 | |
| 3 | Hapoel Qalansawe | 48 | – | – | – | 145 | 45 | +100 | 66 | |
| 4 | Hapoel Tira | 48 | – | – | – | 110 | 56 | +54 | 64 | |
| 5 | Hapoel Hod HaSharon | 48 | – | – | – | 127 | 69 | +58 | 62 | |
| 6 | Hapoel Jaljulia | 48 | – | – | – | 101 | 85 | +16 | 58 | |
| 7 | Maccabi Bnei Tira | 48 | – | – | – | 76 | 102 | −26 | 43 | |
| 8 | Hapoel Peretz Ra'anana | 48 | – | – | – | 89 | 108 | −19 | 39 | |
| 9 | F.C. Ein Ya'akov | 48 | – | – | – | 64 | 90 | −26 | 35 | |
| 10 | Maccabi Kafr Qasim | 48 | – | – | – | 64 | 114 | −50 | 34 | |
| 11 | Hapoel Pardesiya | 48 | – | – | – | 50 | 97 | −47 | 26 | |
| 12 | Hapoel Eliyahu Ra'anana | 48 | – | – | – | 32 | 139 | −107 | 12 | |
| 13 | Beitar Qalansawe | 48 | – | – | – | 4 | 148 | −144 | 0 | |

== Tel Aviv Division ==
| Pos | Team | Pld | W | D | L | GF | GA | GD | Pts | Qualification |
|---|---|---|---|---|---|---|---|---|---|---|
| 1 | Hapoel Ramat HaSharon | 44 | – | – | – | 170 | 25 | +145 | 80 | Promotion play-offs |
| 2 | Hapoel Givat HaShlosha | 44 | – | – | – | 161 | 54 | +107 | 62 | |
| 3 | Beitar Amishav Petah Tikva | 44 | – | – | – | 137 | 50 | +87 | 62 | |
| 4 | Beitar Mahane Yehuda | 44 | – | – | – | 113 | 51 | +62 | 56 | |
| 5 | Hapoel Bavli Tel Aviv | 44 | – | – | – | 96 | 83 | +13 | 51 | |
| 6 | Maccabi Ever HaYarkon | 44 | – | – | – | 88 | 89 | −1 | 46 | |
| 7 | Beitar Ganei Tikva | 44 | – | – | – | 96 | 87 | +9 | 42 | |
| 8 | Beitar Kiryat Matalon | 44 | – | – | – | 87 | 87 | 0 | 36 | |
| 9 | Beitar HaTzafon Tel Aviv | 44 | – | – | – | 63 | 94 | −31 | 30 | |
| 10 | Beitar Rosh HaAyin | 44 | – | – | – | 44 | 169 | −125 | 20 | |
| 11 | Maccabi Rosh HaAyin | 44 | – | – | – | 53 | 208 | −155 | 16 | |
| 12 | Hapoel Afeka | 44 | – | – | – | 14 | 125 | −111 | 7 | |

== Jaffa Division ==
| Pos | Team | Pld | W | D | L | GF | GA | GD | Pts | Qualification |
|---|---|---|---|---|---|---|---|---|---|---|
| 1 | Maccabi Ramat HaShikma | 48 | – | – | – | 146 | 33 | +113 | 83 | Promotion play-offs |
| 2 | Hapoel Azor | 48 | – | – | – | 121 | 39 | +82 | 74 | |
| 3 | Hapoel Kiryat Shalom | 48 | – | – | – | 184 | 64 | +120 | 73 | |
| 4 | Hapoel Ezra | 48 | – | – | – | 128 | 73 | +55 | 56 | |
| 5 | Beitar Jaffa | 48 | – | – | – | 137 | 68 | +69 | 54 | |
| 6 | Beitar Giv'at Shmuel | 48 | – | – | – | 109 | 93 | +16 | 54 | |
| 7 | Tzeirei Jaffa | 48 | – | – | – | 116 | 84 | +32 | 52 | |
| 8 | Maccabi Montefiore | 48 | – | – | – | 86 | 97 | −11 | 43 | |
| 9 | Maccabi Ramat Hen | 48 | – | – | – | 96 | 110 | −14 | 42 | |
| 10 | Bnei Shaltiel | 48 | – | – | – | 66 | 128 | −62 | 30 | |
| 11 | Beitar Ezra | 48 | – | – | – | 63 | 202 | −139 | 23 | |
| 12 | A.S. Hershim | 48 | – | – | – | 51 | 210 | −159 | 17 | |
| 13 | ASA Bar Ilan | 48 | – | – | – | 41 | 133 | −92 | 13 | |

== Central Division ==
| Pos | Team | Pld | W | D | L | GF | GA | GD | Pts | Qualification |
|---|---|---|---|---|---|---|---|---|---|---|
| 1 | Beitar Rehovot | 28 | – | – | – | 88 | 38 | +50 | 44 | Promotion play-offs |
| 2 | A.S. Or Yehuda | 28 | – | – | – | 78 | 35 | +43 | 36 | |
| 3 | Hapoel Ramat Eliyahu | 28 | – | – | – | 53 | 40 | +13 | 35 | |
| 4 | Maccabi Kfar Gvirol | 28 | – | – | – | 56 | 47 | +9 | 29 | |
| 5 | Beitar Yehud | 28 | – | – | – | 53 | 53 | 0 | 29 | |
| 6 | Maccabi Yehud | 28 | – | – | – | 45 | 61 | −16 | 27 | |
| 7 | Maccabi Haim Rehovot | 28 | – | – | – | 28 | 73 | −45 | 13 | |
| 8 | Maccabi Ramat Eliyahu | 28 | – | – | – | 27 | 81 | −54 | 10 | |

== Jerusalem Division ==
| Pos | Team | Pld | W | D | L | GF | GA | GD | Pts | Qualification |
|---|---|---|---|---|---|---|---|---|---|---|
| 1 | Maccabi Dror Lod | 48 | – | – | – | 114 | 46 | +68 | 71 | Promotion play-offs |
| 2 | Beitar Beit Shemesh | 48 | – | – | – | 123 | 49 | +74 | 69 | |
| 3 | Hapoel Zikhronot | 48 | – | – | – | 112 | 63 | +49 | 68 | |
| 4 | Hapoel Bnei Ramla | 48 | – | – | – | 95 | 49 | +46 | 64 | |
| 5 | ASA Jerusalem | 48 | – | – | – | 119 | 75 | +44 | 57 | |
| 6 | Maccabi Beit Shemesh | 48 | – | – | – | 93 | 76 | +17 | 57 | |
| 7 | Hakoah Lod | 48 | – | – | – | 85 | 64 | +21 | 50 | |
| 8 | Beitar Katamonim | 48 | – | – | – | 79 | 61 | +18 | 47 | |
| 9 | Hapoel Katamonim | 48 | – | – | – | 49 | 77 | −28 | 32 | |
| 10 | Hapoel HaRakevet Lod | 48 | – | – | – | 53 | 85 | −32 | 32 | |
| 11 | Hapoel Beit Safafa | 48 | – | – | – | 37 | 108 | −71 | 17 | |
| 12 | Hapoel Bik'a | 48 | – | – | – | 33 | 108 | −75 | 17 | |
| 13 | Hapoel Mevaseret Zion | 48 | – | – | – | 20 | 151 | −131 | 5 | |

== Ashdod Division ==
| Pos | Team | Pld | W | D | L | GF | GA | GD | Pts | Qualification |
|---|---|---|---|---|---|---|---|---|---|---|
| 1 | Maccabi Ashdod | 40 | – | – | – | 141 | 34 | +107 | 71 | Promotion play-offs |
| 2 | Beitar Ashkelon | 40 | – | – | – | 127 | 30 | +97 | 65 | |
| 3 | Hapoel Merhavim | 40 | – | – | – | 84 | 52 | +32 | 57 | |
| 4 | Maccabi Ashkelon | 40 | – | – | – | 106 | 47 | +59 | 50 | |
| 5 | Hapoel Gvar'am | 40 | – | – | – | 89 | 60 | +29 | 46 | |
| 6 | Beitar Ashdod | 40 | – | – | – | 72 | 64 | +8 | 44 | |
| 7 | Hapoel Shimshon Ashkelon | 40 | – | – | – | 69 | 102 | −33 | 30 | |
| 8 | Hapoel Shtulim | 40 | – | – | – | 39 | 93 | −54 | 21 | |
| 9 | Hapoel Azrikam | 40 | – | – | – | 43 | 116 | −73 | 18 | |
| 10 | Hapoel Mefalsim | 40 | – | – | – | 24 | 104 | −80 | 15 | |
| 11 | Hapoel Beit Ezra | 40 | – | – | – | 17 | 109 | −92 | 10 | |

== South Division ==
| Pos | Team | Pld | W | D | L | GF | GA | GD | Pts | Qualification |
|---|---|---|---|---|---|---|---|---|---|---|
| 1 | Maccabi Yavne | 48 | – | – | – | 185 | 49 | +136 | 78 | Promotion play-offs |
| 2 | Maccabi Kiryat Gat | 48 | – | – | – | 149 | 40 | +109 | 75 | |
| 3 | Hapoel Gedera | 48 | – | – | – | 152 | 48 | +104 | 70 | |
| 4 | Hapoel Kiryat Gat | 48 | – | – | – | 115 | 61 | +54 | 66 | |
| 5 | Maccabi Kiryat Malakhi | 48 | – | – | – | 133 | 74 | +59 | 65 | |
| 6 | Beitar Gedera | 48 | – | – | – | 98 | 72 | +26 | 56 | |
| 7 | Hapoel Yavne | 48 | – | – | – | 95 | 104 | −9 | 45 | |
| 8 | Hapoel Hatzav | 48 | – | – | – | 74 | 95 | −21 | 43 | |
| 9 | Maccabi Sderot | 48 | – | – | – | 70 | 157 | −87 | 38 | |
| 10 | Maccabi Gan Yavne | 48 | – | – | – | 67 | 118 | −51 | 32 | |
| 11 | Hapoel Sde Uziyahu | 48 | – | – | – | 50 | 118 | −68 | 25 | |
| 12 | Hapoel Dorot | 48 | – | – | – | 31 | 140 | −109 | 14 | |
| 13 | Maccabi Kiryat Ekron | 48 | – | – | – | 3 | 146 | −143 | 2 | |

== Negev Division ==
| Pos | Team | Pld | W | D | L | GF | GA | GD | Pts | Qualification |
|---|---|---|---|---|---|---|---|---|---|---|
| 1 | Maccabi Be'er Sheva | 40 | – | – | – | 142 | 36 | +106 | 74 | Promotion play-offs |
| 2 | Shimshon Yeruham | 40 | – | – | – | 95 | 48 | +47 | 55 | |
| 3 | Hapoel Yeruham | 40 | – | – | – | 81 | 58 | +23 | 43 | |
| 4 | F.S. Be'er Sheva | 40 | – | – | – | 105 | 93 | +12 | 42 | |
| 5 | Hapoel Arad | 40 | – | – | – | 91 | 88 | +3 | 42 | |
| 6 | Beitar Ofakim | 40 | – | – | – | 64 | 83 | −19 | 36 | |
| 7 | Beitar Dimona | 40 | – | – | – | 67 | 75 | −8 | 34 | |
| 8 | Hapoel Mitzpe Ramon | 40 | – | – | – | 67 | 68 | −1 | 33 | |
| 9 | Hapoel Bnei Shimon | 40 | – | – | – | 58 | 81 | −23 | 28 | |
| 10 | Maccabi Dimona | 40 | – | – | – | 41 | 117 | −76 | 20 | |
| 11 | Hapoel Mashabei Sadeh | 40 | – | – | – | 48 | 112 | −64 | 15 | |

== Promotion play-offs ==
=== North play-offs ===
| Pos | Team | Pld | W | D | L | GF | GA | GD | Pts | Promotion |
|---|---|---|---|---|---|---|---|---|---|---|
| 1 | Maccabi Neve Sha'anan | 6 | – | – | – | 18 | 9 | +9 | 10 | Promoted to Liga Bet |
| 2 | Beitar Tiberias | 6 | – | – | – | 13 | 7 | +6 | 10 | Promoted to Liga Bet |
| 3 | Hapoel Shefa-'Amr | 6 | – | – | – | 23 | 12 | +11 | 8 | Promoted to Liga Bet |
| 4 | Hapoel Kiryat Yam | 6 | – | – | – | 12 | 9 | +3 | 6 | Promoted to Liga Bet |
| 5 | Beitar Binyamina | 6 | – | – | – | 8 | 14 | −6 | 4 | Remained in Liga Gimel |
| 6 | Hapoel Tel Mond | 6 | – | – | – | 11 | 21 | −10 | 3 | Remained in Liga Gimel |
| 7 | Maccabi Afula | 6 | – | – | – | 8 | 21 | −13 | 1 | Remained in Liga Gimel |

Hapoel Jadeidi was suspended from the play-offs due to unruly behavior behalf of their players and crowd.

=== South play-offs ===
| Pos | Team | Pld | W | D | L | GF | GA | GD | Pts | Promotion |
|---|---|---|---|---|---|---|---|---|---|---|
| 1 | Beitar Rehovot | 7 | – | – | – | 21 | 13 | +8 | 9 | Promoted to Liga Bet |
| 2 | Hapoel Ramat HaSharon | 7 | – | – | – | 12 | 10 | +2 | 9 | Promoted to Liga Bet |
| 3 | Maccabi Be'er Sheva | 7 | – | – | – | 19 | 13 | +6 | 8 | Promoted to Liga Bet |
| 4 | Maccabi Dror Lod | 7 | – | – | – | 13 | 9 | +4 | 8 | Promoted to Liga Bet |
| 5 | Maccabi Ramat HaShikma | 7 | – | – | – | 12 | 10 | +2 | 7 | Remained in Liga Gimel |
| 6 | Maccabi Ashdod | 7 | – | – | – | 7 | 10 | −3 | 6 | Remained in Liga Gimel |
| 7 | Hapoel Kafr Qasim | 7 | – | – | – | 7 | 10 | −3 | 6 | Remained in Liga Gimel |
| 8 | Maccabi Yavne | 7 | – | – | – | 7 | 23 | −16 | 1 (Note: 2 points deducted.) | Remained in Liga Gimel |

== See also ==
- 1966–68 Liga Leumit
- 1966–68 Liga Alef
- 1966–68 Liga Bet
