= 2007–08 Liga Bet =

Israeli football season

The 2007–08 Liga Bet season saw Ahva Arraba (champions of the North A division), Maccabi Kafr Qara (champions of the North B division), Hapoel Hadera (champions of the South A division) and Hapoel Masos/Segev Shalom (champions of the South B division) winning the title and promotion to Liga Alef.

The runners-up in each division entered a promotion/relegation play-offs with the clubs ranked 12th in Liga Alef, Maccabi Tamra (from North A division) and Hapoel Arad (from South B division) won their respective play-offs and were promoted.

At the bottom, Maccabi Kafr Yasif, Hapoel Yanuh (from North A division), Hapoel Yokneam, Maccabi Or Akiva (from North B division), Beitar Pardes Hanna, Hapoel Qalansawe (from South A division), Hapoel Tel Sheva and Hapoel Oranit (from South B division) were all automatically relegated to Liga Gimel

== Changes from last season ==
=== Team changes ===
==== To/from Liga Alef ====
- Beitar Ihud Mashhad was promoted from North A division to Liga Alef; Maccabi Sektzia Ma'alot-Tarshiha and Hapoel Kafr Sumei were relegated from Liga Alef and were placed in North A division.
- Ironi Sayid Umm al-Fahm and Ironi Tiberias were promoted from North B division to Liga Alef; Since Hapoel Reineh folded, no relegated club was placed in North B division.
- Maccabi Ironi Kfar Yona and Beitar Kfar Saba were promoted from South A division to Liga Alef; A.S. Ramat Eliyahu was relegated from Liga Alef and was placed in South A division.
- Maccabi Ironi Netivot was promoted from South B division to Liga Alef; Hapoel Arad was relegated from Liga Alef and was placed in South B division.

==== Intra-divisional movements ====
- Beitar Kafr Kanna was transferred from North A division to North B division.

==== To/from Liga Gimel ====
- Ahi Acre and F.C. Ahva Kafr Manda (both from Liga Gimel Upper Galilee) were promoted to North A division, to replace the relegated Hapoel Kisra and Hapoel Deir Hanna.
- Maccabi Beit She'an (from Liga Gimel Jezreel) and Maccabi Barta'a (from Liga Gimel Shomron) were promoted to North B division to replace the demoted Hapoel Tel Hanan and Maccabi Daliyat al-Karmel.
- F.C. Ironi Or Yehuda (from Liga Gimel Tel Aviv) and Hapoel Pardesiya (from Liga Gimel Sharon) were promoted to South A division to replace the relegated Hapoel Kiryat Ono and Hapoel Ihud Bnei Jaffa.
- Bnei Eilat and F.C. Be'er Sheva (both from Liga Gimel Center-South) were promoted to South B division to replace the relegated Maccabi Kiryat Ekron and Hapoel Bnei Lakhish.
- Since Hapoel Reineh folded over the summer, Hapoel Kvalim Mesilot were promoted from Liga Gimel Jezreel) to North B division fill the vacant space.
- Since Hapoel Maxim Lod folded over the summer, Ortodoxim Jaffa were promoted to South A division fill the vacant space.

== North A Division ==
Pos	Team	Pld	W	D	L	GF	GA	GD	Pts	Promotion or relegation
1	Ahva Arraba	30	24	2	4	76	25	+51	74	Promoted to Liga Alef
2	Maccabi Tamra	30	22	6	2	75	18	+57	72	Promotion play-offs
3	Maccabi Sektzia Ma'alot-Tarshiha	30	19	4	7	53	36	+17	61	
4	Hapoel Kafr Sumei	30	18	5	7	56	38	+18	58 (Note: One point deducted?)	
5	Hapoel Halat el-Sharif Tamra	30	13	7	10	59	46	+13	45 (Note: One point deducted.)	
6	Ahi Acre	30	11	5	14	41	44	−3	38	
7	Bnei Abu Snan	30	10	5	15	41	48	−7	35	
8	Maccabi Kabul	30	10	5	15	42	55	−13	35	
9	Maccabi Kafr Sumei	30	10	6	14	38	43	−5	35 (Note: One point deducted?)	
10	Maccabi Sha'ab	30	8	10	12	43	52	−9	34	
11	Hapoel Karmiel	30	9	6	15	33	48	−15	33	
12	Maccabi Bi'ina	30	8	7	15	40	55	−15	31	Folded
13	Hapoel Sakhnin	30	8	7	15	48	58	−10	31	
14	F.C. Ahva Kafr Manda	30	8	6	16	39	59	−20	30	
15	Maccabi Kafr Yasif	30	7	9	14	30	46	−16	30	Relegated to Liga Gimel, folded
16	Hapoel Yanuh	30	8	4	18	31	74	−43	28	Relegated to Liga Gimel, folded

== North B Division ==
Pos	Team	Pld	W	D	L	GF	GA	GD	Pts	Promotion or relegation
1	Maccabi Kafr Qara	30	24	4	2	74	26	+48	76	Promoted to Liga Alef
2	Hapoel Iksal	30	22	6	2	70	20	+50	72	Promotion play-offs
3	Hapoel Migdal HaEmek	30	20	5	5	60	33	+27	65	
4	Hapoel Daliyat al-Karmel	30	17	5	8	73	41	+32	56	
5	Maccabi Beit She'an	30	13	7	10	62	50	+12	46	
6	Maccabi Umm al-Fahm	30	12	6	12	70	49	+21	42	
7	F.C. Tzeirei Bir al-Maksur	30	10	6	14	36	44	−8	36	
8	Ihud Bnei Baka	30	9	8	13	48	59	−11	35	
9	Maccabi Tur'an	30	10	4	16	41	62	−21	34	Folded
10	Hapoel Isfiya	30	8	9	13	50	53	−3	33	
11	Maccabi Barta'a	30	8	8	14	37	54	−17	32	
12	Beitar Kafr Kanna	30	10	1	19	36	83	−47	31	
13	Hapoel Ar'ara	30	9	6	15	34	51	−17	31 (Note: Two points deducted.)	
14	Hapoel Kvalim Mesilot	30	9	4	17	34	64	−30	31	
15	Hapoel Yokneam	30	7	6	17	49	62	−13	27	Relegated to Liga Gimel
16	Maccabi Or Akiva	30	5	9	16	30	53	−23	22	Relegated to Liga Gimel

== South A Division ==
Pos	Team	Pld	W	D	L	GF	GA	GD	Pts	Promotion or relegation
1	Hapoel Hadera	30	20	8	2	60	19	+41	68	Promoted to Liga Alef
2	Hapoel Mahane Yehuda	30	21	4	5	76	25	+51	67	Promotion play-offs
3	Hapoel Azor	30	16	10	4	54	18	+36	58	
4	Shimshon Bnei Tayibe	30	13	14	3	62	32	+30	53	
5	F.C. Ironi Or Yehuda	30	15	6	9	56	42	+14	51	
6	Beitar Ramat Gan	30	12	9	9	41	33	+8	45	
7	Hapoel Pardesiya	30	12	6	12	49	47	+2	42	
8	F.C. Kafr Qasim	30	10	10	10	52	52	0	40	
9	Hapoel Ramat Israel	30	11	5	14	46	52	−6	38	
10	Hapoel Hod HaSharon	30	9	8	13	35	48	−13	35	
11	Shikun Vatikim Ramat Gan	30	9	5	16	35	75	−40	32	
12	Ortodoxim Jaffa	30	8	7	15	28	43	−15	31	
13	A.S. Ramat Eliyahu	30	8	6	16	55	72	−17	30	
14	Otzma F.C. Holon	30	8	6	16	29	52	−23	30	
15	Beitar Pardes Hanna	30	6	10	14	42	53	−11	28	Relegated to Liga Gimel
16	Hapoel Qalansawe	30	3	4	23	21	78	−57	13	Relegated to Liga Gimel, folded

== South B Division ==
Pos	Team	Pld	W	D	L	GF	GA	GD	Pts	Promotion or relegation
1	Hapoel Masos/Segev Shalom	30	25	4	1	77	19	+58	79	Promoted to Liga Alef
2	Hapoel Arad	30	22	6	2	66	24	+42	72	Promotion play-offs
3	F.C. Dimona	30	17	3	10	50	29	+21	54	
4	Maccabi Be'er Ya'akov	30	16	6	8	57	36	+21	54	
5	Bnei Eilat	30	14	6	10	63	43	+20	48	
6	Maccabi Sha'arayim	30	13	9	8	56	40	+16	48	
7	Beitar Giv'at Ze'ev	30	13	5	12	48	35	+13	44	
8	Beitar Ma'ale Adumim	30	12	7	11	50	45	+5	43	
9	Mo'adon Tzeirei Rahat	30	13	3	14	42	58	−16	42	
10	F.C. Be'er Sheva	30	12	1	17	43	59	−16	37	
11	Hapoel Merhavim	30	10	5	15	63	64	−1	35	
12	Hapoel Tirat Shalom	30	9	8	13	46	52	−6	35	
13	Maccabi Sderot	30	9	3	18	48	70	−22	30	
14	Hapoel Jaljulia	30	8	5	17	36	66	−30	29	
15	Hapoel Tel Sheva	30	9	1	20	30	71	−41	27 (Note: One point deducted.)	Relegated to Liga Gimel
16	Hapoel Oranit	30	0	4	26	29	93	−64	4	Relegated to Liga Gimel

== Promotion play-offs ==
=== North play-off ===
Liga Bet North A and Liga Bet North B runners-up, Maccabi Tamra faced the 12th placed club in Liga Alef North, Beitar Haifa in a two legged play-off. The Liga Bet North A runners-up, Hapoel Iksal was suspended from the play-offs, following an attempt for match fixing, prior to their scheduled match against Beitar Haifa.

Beitar Haifa	1 - 1	Maccabi Tamra

Maccabi Tamra	3 - 1 (a.e.t.)	Beitar Haifa

Maccabi Tamra won 4-2 on aggregate and was promoted to Liga Alef.

=== South play-off ===
Liga Bet South A and Liga Bet South B runners-up, Hapoel Mahane Yehuda and Hapoel Arad faced the 12th placed club in Liga Alef South, Hapoel Tzafririm Holon. The teams played each other in a round-robin tournament.

Hapoel Arad	2 - 1	Hapoel Mahane Yehuda

Hapoel Tzafririm Holon	2 - 0	Hapoel Mahane Yehuda

Hapoel Arad	4 - 1	Hapoel Tzafririm Holon

Pos	Team	Pld	W	D	L	GF	GA	GD	Pts	Promotion or relegation
1	Hapoel Arad	2	2	0	0	6	2	+4	6	Promoted to Liga Alef
2	Hapoel Tzafririm Holon	2	1	0	1	3	4	−1	3	Relegated to Liga Bet
3	Hapoel Mahane Yehuda	2	0	0	2	1	4	−3	0	Remained in Liga Bet

Hapoel Arad won the play-offs and was promoted to Liga Alef.
