= 2006–07 Liga Alef =

Israeli football season

The 2006–07 Liga Alef season saw Hapoel Bnei Jadeidi (champions of the North Division) and Hapoel Maxim Lod (champions of the South Division) winning the title and promotion to Liga Artzit. However as Hapoel Maxim Lod folded during the following summer, eventually second placed Hapoel Kfar Shalem was promoted instead.

At the bottom, the bottom two clubs in each division, Hapoel Reineh, Maccabi Sektzia Ma'alot-Tarshiha (from North division), A.S. Ramat Eliyahu and Hapoel Arad (from South division) were all automatically relegated to Liga Bet, whilst the two clubs which were ranked in 12th place in each division, Hapoel Kafr Sumei and Hapoel Tzafririm Holon entered a promotion/relegation play-offs, Hapoel Tzafririm Holon prevailing to stay in Liga Alef, while Hapoel Kafr Sumei were relegated after losing the play-offs.

== North Division ==
Pos	Team	Pld	W	D	L	GF	GA	GD	Pts	Promotion or relegation
1	Hapoel Bnei Jadeidi	26	18	6	2	55	21	+34	60	Promoted to Liga Artzit
2	Hapoel Umm al-Fahm	26	17	6	3	51	15	+36	57	
3	Hapoel Asi Gilboa	26	14	5	7	37	25	+12	47	
4	Maccabi Ironi Shlomi/Nahariya	26	12	7	7	30	23	+7	43	
5	Hapoel Afula	26	12	6	8	32	27	+5	42	
6	Maccabi Tzur Shalom	26	11	4	11	41	42	−1	37	
7	Hapoel Makr	26	10	6	10	34	42	−8	36	
8	Beitar Haifa	26	9	8	9	33	36	−3	35	
9	Hapoel Kafr Kanna	26	9	4	13	37	35	+2	31	
10	Beitar Safed	26	6	10	10	29	33	−4	28	
11	Hapoel Ahva Haifa	26	7	5	14	24	39	−15	26	
12	Hapoel Kafr Sumei	26	5	10	11	20	38	−18	25	Relegation play-offs
13	Hapoel Reineh	26	6	2	18	23	51	−28	20	Relegated to Liga Bet, folded
14	Maccabi Sektzia Ma'alot-Tarshiha	26	3	7	16	20	39	−19	16	Relegated to Liga Bet

== South Division ==
Pos	Team	Pld	W	D	L	GF	GA	GD	Pts	Promotion or relegation
1	Hapoel Maxim Lod	26	15	7	4	57	24	+33	52	Promoted to Liga Artzit, folded
2	Hapoel Kfar Shalem	26	12	7	7	35	23	+12	43	Promoted to Liga Artzit
3	Hapoel Nahlat Yehuda	26	12	6	8	39	31	+8	42	
4	Maccabi Ironi Bat Yam	26	12	4	10	34	26	+8	40	
5	Ironi Ofakim	26	12	4	10	35	31	+4	40	
6	Ironi Ramla	26	9	9	8	32	35	−3	36	
7	Maccabi Yavne	26	8	9	9	38	37	+1	33	
8	Hapoel Mevaseret Zion	26	9	6	11	38	46	−8	33	
9	Maccabi Amishav Petah Tikva	26	9	6	11	31	40	−9	33	
10	Maccabi Kiryat Malakhi	26	8	8	10	31	36	−5	32	
11	Maccabi Kiryat Gat	26	7	10	9	29	31	−2	31	
12	Hapoel Tzafririm Holon	26	9	3	14	29	48	−19	30	Relegation play-offs
13	A.S. Ramat Eliyahu	26	7	6	13	23	32	−9	27	Relegated to Liga Bet
14	Hapoel Arad	26	6	9	11	33	44	−11	27	Relegated to Liga Bet

== Relegation play-offs ==
=== North play-off ===
The 12th placed club in Liga Alef North, Hapoel Kafr Sumei, faced the Liga Bet North A and Liga Bet North B runners-up, Ahva Arraba and Ironi Tiberias. The teams played each other in a round-robin tournament, with all matches played at a neutral venue, Green Stadium.

Hapoel Kafr Sumei	3 - 4	Ahva Arraba

Ironi Tiberias	3 - 3	Hapoel Kafr Sumei

Ironi Tiberias	2 - 0	Ahva Arraba

Pos	Team	Pld	W	D	L	GF	GA	GD	Pts	Promotion or relegation
1	Ironi Tiberias	2	1	1	0	5	3	+2	4	Promoted to Liga Alef
2	Ahva Arraba	2	1	0	1	4	5	−1	3	Remained in Liga Bet
3	Hapoel Kafr Sumei	2	0	1	1	6	7	−1	1	Relegated to Liga Bet

Ironi Tiberias won the play-offs and was promoted to Liga Alef.

=== South play-off ===
The 12th placed club in Liga Alef South, Hapoel Tzafririm Holon, faced the Liga Bet South A and Liga Bet South B runners-up, Beitar Kfar Saba and Hapoel Masos/Segev Shalom. The teams played each other in a round-robin tournament, with all matches held at a neutral venue, Bat Yam Municipal Stadium.

Hapoel Masos/Segev Shalom	2 - 2	Beitar Kfar Saba

Hapoel Tzafririm Holon	3 - 0	Hapoel Masos/Segev Shalom

Hapoel Tzafririm Holon	3 - 0	Beitar Kfar Saba

Pos	Team	Pld	W	D	L	GF	GA	GD	Pts	Promotion or qualification
1	Hapoel Tzafririm Holon	2	2	0	0	6	0	+6	6	Remained in Liga Alef
2	Beitar Kfar Saba	2	0	1	1	2	5	−3	1	Promoted to Liga Alef
2	Hapoel Masos/Segev Shalom	2	0	1	1	2	5	−3	1	Remained in Liga Bet

Hapoel Tzafririm Holon won the play-offs to retain its place in Liga Alef. Since Hapoel Maxim Lod folded during the summer break, Beitar Kfar Saba was promoted as well, as they had better winning percentage of the two Liga Bet south divisions runners-up.
