= Vayer =

Vayer is a surname. Notable people with the surname include:

- Adam Vayer (born 1987), Israeli footballer currently playing for Maccabi Ironi Kiryat Ata
- François de La Mothe Le Vayer (1588–1672), French writer who was known to use the pseudonym Orosius Tubero
- Gábor Vayer (born 1977), Hungarian football player who currently plays for Paksi SE
