= 2006–07 Liga Bet =

Israeli football season

The 2006–07 Liga Bet season saw Beitar Ihud Mashhad (champions of the North A division), Ironi Sayid Umm al-Fahm (champions of the North B division), Maccabi Ironi Kfar Yona (champions of the South A division) and Maccabi Ironi Netivot (champions of the South B division) winning the title and promotion to Liga Alef.

The runners-up in each division entered a promotion/relegation play-offs with the clubs ranked 12th in Liga Alef. In the north section, Ironi Tiberias (from North B division) won the play-offs and was promoted. In the south section, Hapoel Tzafririm Holon from Liga Alef won over both runners-up and remained in Liga Alef. However, since Hapoel Maxim Lod folded over the summer, South A division runner-up, Beitar Kfar Saba was also promoted.

At the bottom, Hapoel Kisra, Hapoel Deir Hanna (from North A division), Hapoel Kiryat Ono, Hapoel Ihud Bnei Jaffa (from South A division), Maccabi Kiryat Ekron and Hapoel Bnei Lakhish (from South B division) were all automatically relegated to Liga Gimel. In North B division, Hapoel Tel Hanan and Maccabi Daliyat al-Karmel were both had their activity suspended during the season and were demoted to Liga Gimel.

== North A Division ==
Pos	Team	Pld	W	D	L	GF	GA	GD	Pts	Promotion or relegation
1	Beitar Ihud Mashhad	30	25	4	1	69	22	+47	79	Promoted to Liga Alef
2	Ahva Arraba	30	24	1	5	62	14	+48	70 (Note: 3 points deducted?)	Promotion play-offs
3	Maccabi Tamra	30	21	5	4	65	28	+37	67 (Note: 1 point deducted?)	
4	Hapoel Bi'ina	30	16	1	13	57	49	+8	49	
5	Hapoel Karmiel	30	13	8	9	50	28	+22	47	
6	Maccabi Sha'ab	30	13	8	9	44	39	+5	47	
7	Maccabi Kabul	30	12	8	10	47	38	+9	44	
8	Bnei Abu Snan	30	13	4	13	42	41	+1	43	
9	Maccabi Kafr Sumei	30	9	6	15	62	54	+8	33	
10	Maccabi Kafr Yasif	30	9	5	16	41	59	−18	32	
11	Hapoel Yanuh	30	8	6	16	39	63	−24	30	
12	Hapoel Halat el-Sharif Tamra	30	8	5	17	32	53	−21	29	
13	Beitar Kafr Kanna	30	8	5	17	36	60	−24	29	
14	Hapoel Sakhnin	30	10	5	15	49	60	−11	23 (Note: 12 points deducted?)	
15	Hapoel Kisra	30	6	4	20	26	65	−39	22	Relegated to Liga Gimel
16	Hapoel Deir Hanna	30	5	5	20	35	83	−48	18 (Note: 2 points deducted?)	Relegated to Liga Gimel, folded

== North B Division ==
Pos	Team	Pld	W	D	L	GF	GA	GD	Pts	Promotion or qualification
1	Ironi Sayid Umm al-Fahm	26	20	5	1	58	18	+40	65	Promoted to Liga Alef
2	Ironi Tiberias	26	17	7	2	62	18	+44	58	Promotion play-offs
3	Maccabi Umm al-Fahm	26	17	7	2	50	15	+35	57 (Note: 1 point deducted?)	
4	Hapoel Migdal HaEmek	26	11	8	7	49	29	+20	41	
5	Hapoel Iksal	26	11	7	8	44	32	+12	40	
6	Maccabi Tur'an	26	8	9	9	38	40	−2	33	
7	Ihud Bnei Baka	26	8	7	11	33	43	−10	31	
8	Maccabi Or Akiva	26	8	4	14	31	52	−21	28	
9	Maccabi Kafr Qara	26	7	6	13	32	44	−12	27	
10	Hapoel Yokneam	26	7	4	15	23	39	−16	23 (Note: 2 points deducted?)	
11	F.C. Tzeirei Bir al-Maksur	26	5	8	13	25	41	−16	23	
12	Hapoel Daliyat al-Karmel	26	6	5	15	29	59	−30	23	
13	Hapoel Isfiya	26	5	6	15	28	62	−34	21	
14	Hapoel Ar'ara	26	5	11	10	21	31	−10	18 (Note: 8 points deducted?)	

Notes:

During the season, Hapoel Tel Hanan and Maccabi Daliyat al-Karmel failed to show to fixtures and were punished with suspension of activity, their record was annulled and the clubs were demoted to Liga Gimel.

== South A Division ==
Pos	Team	Pld	W	D	L	GF	GA	GD	Pts	Promotion or relegation
1	Maccabi Kfar Yona	30	22	5	3	69	20	+49	71	Promoted to Liga Alef
2	Beitar Kfar Saba	30	21	5	4	61	26	+35	68	Promotion play-offs
3	Hapoel Azor	30	20	3	7	74	37	+37	63	
4	Shimshon Bnei Tayibe	40	18	8	14	52	24	+28	62	
5	Hapoel Hod HaSharon	30	14	6	10	41	40	+1	48	
6	Hapoel Hadera	30	11	9	10	58	42	+16	42	
7	Beitar Ramat Gan	30	11	4	15	43	54	−11	37	
8	Hapoel Mahane Yehuda	30	9	9	12	37	44	−7	36	
9	Shikun Vatikim Ramat Gan	30	10	5	15	38	56	−18	35	
10	Otzma F.C. Holon	30	8	10	12	25	33	−8	34	
11	Hapoel Qalansawe	30	10	4	16	35	52	−17	33 (Note: One point deducted.)	
12	F.C. Kafr Qasim	30	8	7	15	30	40	−10	31	
13	Beitar Pardes Hanna	30	8	7	15	32	46	−14	31	
14	Hapoel Ramat Israel	30	8	7	15	37	53	−16	31	
15	Hapoel Kiryat Ono	30	8	6	16	28	42	−14	30	Relegated to Liga Gimel
16	Hapoel Ihud Bnei Jaffa	30	3	7	20	24	75	−51	16	Relegated to Liga Gimel

== South B Division ==
Pos	Team	Pld	W	D	L	GF	GA	GD	Pts	Promotion or relegation
1	Maccabi Netivot	30	22	7	1	51	12	+39	73	Promoted to Liga Alef
2	Hapoel Masos/Segev Shalom	30	20	6	4	85	23	+62	66	Promotion play-offs
3	Maccabi Be'er Ya'akov	30	19	7	4	57	26	+31	64	
4	Hapoel Merhavim	30	13	9	8	57	35	+22	48	
5	Maccabi Sderot	30	14	8	8	55	28	+27	47 (Note: 3 points deducted?)	
6	Beitar Ma'ale Adumim	30	13	8	9	58	34	+24	47	
7	Maccabi Sha'arayim	30	11	7	12	51	52	−1	40	
8	F.C. Dimona	30	10	6	14	36	55	−19	36	
9	Hapoel Tirat Shalom	30	10	5	15	50	48	+2	35	
10	Hapoel Tel Sheva	30	8	10	12	39	46	−7	34	
11	Beitar Giv'at Ze'ev	30	7	12	11	27	40	−13	33	
12	Mo'adon Tzeirei Rahat	30	8	9	13	42	55	−13	33	
13	Hapoel Jaljulia	30	9	5	16	44	61	−17	32	
14	Hapoel Oranit	30	8	5	17	37	68	−31	29	
15	Maccabi Kiryat Ekron	30	5	8	17	26	75	−49	21 (Note: Two points deducted.)	Relegated to Liga Gimel
16	Hapoel Bnei Lakhish	30	4	6	20	25	82	−57	12 (Note: 6 points deducted?)	Relegated to Liga Gimel, folded

== Promotion play-offs ==
=== North play-off ===
Liga Bet North A and North B runners-up, Ahva Arraba and Ironi Tiberias faced the 12th placed club in Liga Alef North, Hapoel Kafr Sumei. The teams played each other in a round-robin tournament, with all matches held at a neutral venue, Green Stadium.

Hapoel Kafr Sumei	3 - 4	Ahva Arraba

Ironi Tiberias	3 - 3	Hapoel Kafr Sumei

Ironi Tiberias	2 - 0	Ahva Arraba

Pos	Team	Pld	W	D	L	GF	GA	GD	Pts	Promotion or relegation
1	Ironi Tiberias	2	1	1	0	5	3	+2	4	Promoted to Liga Alef
2	Ahva Arraba	2	1	0	1	4	5	−1	3	Remained in Liga Bet
3	Hapoel Kafr Sumei	2	0	1	1	6	7	−1	1	Relegated to Liga Bet

Ironi Tiberias won the play-offs and was promoted to Liga Alef.

=== South play-off ===
Liga Bet South A and Liga Bet South B runners-up, Beitar Kfar Saba and Hapoel Masos/Segev Shalom faced the 12th placed club in Liga Alef South, Hapoel Tzafririm Holon. The teams played each other in a round-robin tournament, with all matches held at a neutral venue, Bat Yam Municipal Stadium.

Hapoel Masos/Segev Shalom	2 - 2	Beitar Kfar Saba

Hapoel Tzafririm Holon	3 - 0	Hapoel Masos/Segev Shalom

Hapoel Tzafririm Holon	3 - 0	Beitar Kfar Saba

Pos	Team	Pld	W	D	L	GF	GA	GD	Pts	Promotion or qualification
1	Hapoel Tzafririm Holon	2	2	0	0	6	0	+6	6	Remained in Liga Alef
2	Beitar Kfar Saba	2	0	1	1	2	5	−3	1	Promoted to Liga Alef
2	Hapoel Masos/Segev Shalom	2	0	1	1	2	5	−3	1	Remained in Liga Bet

Hapoel Tzafririm Holon won the play-offs to retain its place in Liga Alef. Since Hapoel Maxim Lod folded during the summer break, Beitar Kfar Saba was promoted as well, as they had better winning percentage of the two Liga Bet south divisions' runners-up.
