= Sebastian Israël =

French-Israeli footballer (born 1977)

Sebastian Israël סבסטיאן ישראל
Personal information
- Date of birth: 21 December 1977 (age 48)
- Place of birth: France
- Position: Midfielder

Youth career
- Paris Saint-Germain

Senior career*
Years	Team	Apps	(Gls)
1999–2000	Sektzia Ness Ziona	-	(-)
2000	Ironi Rishon leZion	11	(0)
2001–2002	Sektzia Ness Ziona	-	(-)
2003	Hapoel Marmorek	-	(-)
- * Club domestic league appearances and goals

Sebastian Israël (Hebrew: סבסטיאן ישראל; born 21 December 1977) is a former French-Israeli footballer.
