= Ramat Eliyahu S.C. =

Israeli football club

- Full name: Agudat Sport Ramat Eliyahu אגודת ספורט רמת אליהו
- Founded: 1984
- Dissolved: 2008 (merged)
- Ground: Ramat Eliyahu football field
- 2007–08: Liga Bet SouthA, 13th

Ramat Eliyahu S.C. (Hebrew: אגודת ספורט רמת אליהו) is an Israeli football club which represents Ramat Eliyahu neighborhood in Rishon LeZion. The club currently operates junior teams, after its senior team dissolved in 2008.

Its youth team Ramat Eliyahu S.C. "Bnei Sapir" is currently playing in the Youth League Center (fourth youth tier) and has won it during the 2015-16 season.

== History ==
The club was founded in 1984 and played in the lower leagues throughout most of its existence, winning Liga Gimel Tel Aviv division in 1988–89 and Liga Bet South B division in 1998–99.

In 2000 the club merged with the fledgling Maccabi Jaffa, and although the club kept its name, its senior team moved to play in Jaffa, Tel Aviv. The merged club played in Liga Alef (which was fourth tier at the time). The club relegated at the end of the 2006–07 season and merged once more with Hapoel Ihud Bnei Jaffa to form F.C. Bnei Jaffa, which took the club's place in Liga Bet. In 2012 the club merged with Hapoel F.C. Ortodoxim Jaffa to form F.C. Bnei Jaffa Ortodoxim.

== Honours ==
=== League ===
Honour	No.	Years
Fourth tier	1	1998–99
Fifth tier	1	1988–89
