= Adam Vayer =

Israeli footballer

Adam Vayer אדם וייר
Personal information
- Full name: Adam Vayer
- Date of birth: August 16, 1987 (age 39)
- Place of birth: Haifa, Israel
- Position: Midfielder

Youth career
- Maccabi Netanya

Senior career*
Years	Team	Apps	(Gls)
2006–2009	Maccabi Netanya	1	(0)
2006	→ Beitar Haifa (loan)	6	(1)
2007	→ Maccabi Ironi Kiryat Ata (loan)	13	(1)
2008	→ Hapoel Acre (loan)	2	(0)
2009	→ Hapoel Bnei Tamra (loan)	17	(5)
2009–2010	Maccabi Tzur Shalom	19	(4)
2010–2011	Maccabi Ironi Kiryat Ata	20	(1)
2011–2012	Beitar Haifa	14	(2)
2012–2013	Hapoel Hadera	32	(8)
2013–2014	Maccabi Ironi Kiryat Ata	17	(1)
2014–2015	Beitar Haifa	0	(0)

International career
2004	Israel U17	3	(0)
- * Club domestic league appearances and goals

Adam Vayer (Hebrew: אדם וייר; born 16 August 1987) is an Israeli footballer.
