= 2006–07 Liga Artzit =

The 2006–07 Liga Artzit season saw Hapoel Ramat Gan win the title and promotion to Liga Leumit alongside runners-up Ironi Rishon LeZion. Hapoel Herzliya and Maccabi Be'er Sheva were relegated to Liga Alef.

== Final table ==
Pos	Team	Pld	W	D	L	GF	GA	GD	Pts	Promotion or relegation
1	Hapoel Ramat Gan	33	19	9	5	46	21	+25	66	Promoted to Liga Leumit
2	Ironi Rishon LeZion	33	18	7	8	53	34	+19	61	Promoted to Liga Leumit
3	Hapoel Bnei Tamra	33	15	9	9	39	33	+6	54	
4	Sektzia Nes Tziona	33	13	13	7	46	31	+15	52	
5	Maccabi Ironi Tirat HaCarmel	33	12	9	12	43	46	−3	45	
6	Beitar Shimshon Tel Aviv	33	10	14	9	31	28	+3	44	
7	Maccabi HaShikma/Ramat Hen	33	11	9	13	33	33	0	42	
8	Maccabi Kafr Kanna	33	12	6	15	28	38	−10	42	
9	Hapoel Marmorek	33	10	11	12	37	38	−1	41	
10	Maccabi Ironi Kiryat Ata	33	10	10	13	37	39	−2	40	
11	Hapoel Herzliya	33	10	7	16	35	41	−6	37	Relegated to Liga Alef
12	Maccabi Be'er Sheva	33	2	8	23	15	61	−46	14	Relegated to Liga Alef

Source: rsssf.com
