= 2004–05 Liga Artzit =

The 2004–05 Liga Artzit season saw Hapoel Ashkelon win the title and promotion to Liga Leumit alongside runners-up Maccabi Be'er Sheva. Hapoel Majd al-Krum were relegated to Liga Alef, whilst Maccabi Ironi Kiryat Ata, who finished second from bottom, were reprieved after Maccabi Ramat Amidar left the league and merged with Hakoah Ramat Gan.

== Final table ==
Pos	Team	Pld	W	D	L	GF	GA	GD	Pts	Promotion or relegation
1	Hapoel Ashkelon	33	21	10	2	51	14	+37	73	Promoted to Liga Leumit
2	Maccabi Be'er Sheva	33	18	12	3	51	19	+32	66	Promoted to Liga Leumit
3	Hapoel Marmorek	33	19	6	8	62	33	+29	63	
4	Maccabi Ramat Amidar	33	14	11	8	44	33	+11	53	Merged with Hakoah Ramat Gan
5	Maccabi HaShikma Ramat Hen	33	12	11	10	45	43	+2	47	
6	Beitar Shimshon Tel Aviv	33	8	14	11	40	40	0	38	
7	Hapoel Herzliya	33	9	11	13	33	45	−12	38	
8	Hapoel Ramat Gan	33	8	13	12	41	52	−11	37	
9	Maccabi Ironi Tirat HaCarmel	33	7	13	13	37	50	−13	34	
10	Maccabi Kafr Kanna	33	9	7	17	32	46	−14	33 (Note: One point deducted.)	
11	Maccabi Ironi Kiryat Ata	33	6	7	20	42	70	−28	25	
12	Hapoel Majd al-Krum	33	4	11	18	33	66	−33	16 (Note: Seven points deducted.)	Relegated to Liga Alef

Source: rsssf.com
