= Hapoel Makr F.C. =

Israeli football club

Hapoel Maker
- Full name: Hapoel Makr Football Club
- Dissolved: 2008
- League: Liga Alef
- 2007–08: 14th (relegated)

Hapoel Makr was an Israeli football club based in Jadeidi-Makr.

== History ==
The club played during most of its existence in the lower leagues of the Israeli football league system, at its best reaching Liga Bet in 1981, where the club played for five years before relegating back to Liga Gimel. In 2000 the club finished as runner-up in its Liga Gimel division, then sixth tier in the league system, and was promoted back to Liga Bet. At the end of the 2002–03 season, the club won the North A division of Liga Bet at was promoted to fourth tier Liga Alef, where the club played for five seasons, before folding due to financial difficulties.

Following the club's disintegration, Hapoel Bnei Jadeidi changed its name to Hapoel Bnei Jadeidi-Makr. However, in 2013 a successor club was formed for the club under the name, Hapoel Bnei Makr, which led Bnei Jadeidi-Makr to return to its original name. Both clubs played in Liga Gimel Lower Galilee division, both folding during the season.

== Honours ==
=== League ===
Honour	No.	Years
Fifth tier	2	1979–80, 2002–03
