= Hapoel Reineh F.C. =

Israeli football club

Hapoel Reineh
- Full name: Hapoel Reineh Football Club
- Dissolved: 2007
- League: Liga Alef
- 2006–07: 13th (relegated)

Hapoel Reineh was an Israeli football club based in Reineh.

== History ==
The club played during most of its existence in the lower leagues of the Israeli football league system. In 1994, the club was promoted to Liga Bet, where it played for the next nine seasons, before winning the North B division and being promoted to fourth tier Liga Alef. The club played for four seasons in Liga Alef, finishing 8th, its best placing, in 2005–06. In 2004–05, the club qualified to the 9th round of the State Cup, where it met Hapoel Nahlat Yehuda and lost 0–1. In 2006–07, the club finished 13th and was relegated to Liga Bet. Shortly afterwards the club folded.

== Honours ==
=== League ===
Honour	No.	Years
Fifth tier	2	1993–94, 2002–03
