= Sektzia Ness Ziona F.C. =

Israeli football club

Sektzia Ness Ziona
- Full name: Football Section Ness Ziona
- Founded: 1955; 71 years ago
- Ground: Ness Ziona Stadium, Ness Ziona, Israel
- Capacity: 3,500
- Chairman: Eli Cohen
- Manager: Yossi Hakim
- League: Liga Gimel Center
- 2024–25: Liga Bet, 16 of 16 (relegated)
Home colours	Away colours	Third colours

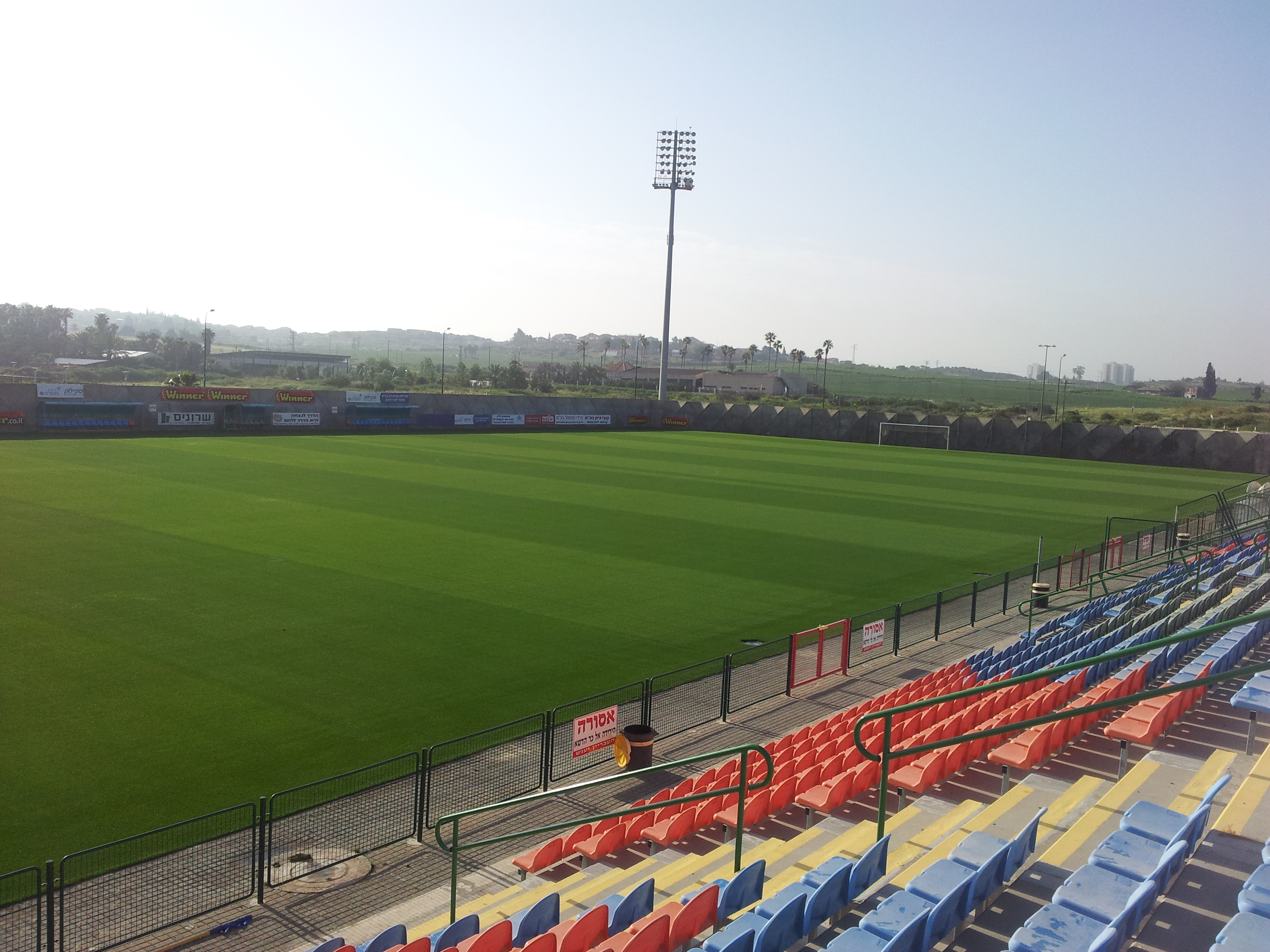
Ness Ziona Stadium

Sektzia Ness Ziona (Hebrew: סקציית כדורגל נס-ציונה, Sektziyat Kaduregel Nes Tziona, lit. 'Football Section Ness Ziona') was a professional football club from the Israeli city of Ness Ziona. It most recently played in the Liga Alef South, the third tier of domestic football. Home matches were previously played at the Ness Ziona Stadium. Upon their promotion to the Israeli Premier League for the 2019–20 and 2022–23 seasons, the club moved its home matches to the HaMoshava Stadium in Petah Tikva. It announced its disbandment on September 5th, 2024, due to unresolved financial difficulties.

== History ==
The club was founded as F.S. Nes Ziona in 1955, following a merger of the local football clubs in Ness Ziona, Israel. In their second season of existence they were promoted from Liga Gimel to Liga Bet. In the 1962–63 season, they won Liga Bet South B division and were promoted to Liga Alef. Three season later, in the 1965–66 season, they won Liga Alef South division and were promoted to Liga Leumit, then the top division. The 1966–68 season was played over two years and involved a 4-round (60 match) competition. However, the club managed only eight wins and were relegated. This was to be their only appearance in the top division to date.

During the mid-1990s the club played in Liga Artzit, then the second tier. In the 1998–99 season the club finished second from bottom and had four points deducted for breaking budget rules. They were due to be relegated to the third tier, but were demoted to the fourth tier, Liga Alef, as their budget for the 1999–2000 season was not approved by the Israel Football Association. After finishing bottom of Liga Alef in 2000–01, they folded.

In the 2004–05 season, Liga Bet club from Ness Ziona, Maccabi Ben Zvi, became Ironi Ness Ziona or Maccabi Ben Zvi\Ironi, as recognized by the Israel Football Association. Ironi finished as runners-up to Hapoel Arad, and promoted to Liga Alef after successful promotion play-offs against Hapoel Azor and Beitar Giv'at Ze'ev. Ironi Ness Ziona was renamed in the summer of 2005, becoming Sektzia Ness Ziona (an alternative Hebrew transliteration for "Section"), and the club was reborn. at the end of the 2005–06 season, the club won Liga Alef South and promotion to Liga Artzit.

The club won Liga Artzit in 2008–09, the last season of Liga Artzit as the third tier of Israeli football, and was promoted to Liga Leumit. In the 2012–13 season, the club finished second bottom in Liga Leumit and relegated to Liga Alef, where they play today. After a few seasons in Liga Leumit, they became 2nd league champions in 2018–19, and started in the Israel Premier League in 2019–20.

== Current squad ==
As of July 2024

No.	Pos.	Nation	Player
2	DF	ISR	Ilay Tomer
5	DF	ISR	Giorgi Kopreba
8	FW	ISR	Eden Hershkovitz
11	MF	ISR	Amnon Tadela
12	MF	ISR	Ben Khawaz
14	FW	ISR	Yanai David
16	MF	ISR	Sivan Talmi
18	FW	ISR	Sean Buskila
20	DF	ISR	Miki Siroshtein

No.	Pos.	Nation	Player
21	MF	ISR	Dan Kaduri
22	GK	ISR	Roee Cohen
23	DF	ISR	Amir Ben Shimon
27	MF	ISR	Sean Malka
33	DF	ISR	Uri Tzaadon
98	MF	ISR	Lior Berkovich
—	DF	ISR	Liam Nagar
—	MF	ISR	Yoav Librus
—	MF	ISR	Adir Rotstein

== Honours ==
- Second tier (1):
  - 1965–66 Liga Alef
- Third tier (5):
  - 1960–61 Liga Bet
  - 1962–63 Liga Bet
  - 1972–73 Liga Bet
  - 1990–91 Liga Alef
  - 2008–09 Liga Artzit
- Fourth tier (3):
  - 1956–57 Liga Gimel
  - 1989–90 Liga Bet
  - 2005–06 Liga Alef

== Former notable managers ==
- Rafi Cohen (born 1965)

== See also ==
- Ness Ziona Stadium
- HaMoshava Stadium
