= Ahva Arraba F.C. =

Israeli football club

Ahva Arraba
- Full name: Ahva Arraba Football Club מועדון כדורגל אחווה עראבה الأخوة عرابة
- Founded: 2004
- Ground: Doha Stadium, Sakhnin
- Capacity: 8,500
- Chairman: Mohammad Wael
- Manager: Ahmad Abas
- League: Liga Alef North
- 2024–25: Liga Alef North, 9th of 16
Home colours	Away colours

Ahva Arraba F.C. (Hebrew: אחווה עראבה, Arabic: الأخوة عرابة), was an Israeli football team based in Arraba.

== History ==
The club was founded in 2004 and succeeded the previous club of the local council, Hapoel Arraba, which last played in Liga Bet North A division at the 2003–04 season and finished 12th. Ahva Arraba loaned the previous club players, and started in Liga Gimel Western Galilee division at the 2004–05 season, where they finished runners-up, and promoted to Liga Bet. In 2006–07 the club finished runners-up in the North A division and qualified for the Promotion play-offs, where they lost to Ironi Tiberias. Ahva Arraba won the North A division in 2007–08 and promoted to Liga Alef North. The following season they also finished as champions, with a margin of 20 points over the second placed club and earned promotion to the newly restructured second tier, Liga Leumit, jumping four levels in three seasons. The club's best placing to date came at the 2009–10 season, when they finished ninth in Liga Leumit. However, in the following season, the club finished bottom and relegated to Liga Alef.

In 2013–14, the club finished bottom in Liga Alef North and relegated to Liga Bet.

In 2014–15, the club finished third bottom in Liga Bet North A and further relegated, to Liga Gimel, after losing in the Relegation play-offs 0–1 to Hapoel Kaukab and 1–2 to Hapoel Bnei Maghar in the decisive match.

== Honours ==
=== League ===
Honour	No.	Years
Fourth tier	1	2008–09
Fifth tier	1	2007–08

== See also ==
- Sports in Israel
