= Ihud Umm al-Fahm F.C. =

Israeli football club

- Full name: Ihud Umm al-Fahm Football Club
- Short name: Umm Al Fahm
- Founded: 1963; 63 years ago
- Ground: HaShalom Stadium
- Capacity: 5,800
- Chairman: Mohamed Jabareen
- Manager: Vacant
- League: Liga Alef North
- 2024–25: Liga Leumit, 16th of 16 (relegated)
Home colours	Away colours

Ihud Umm al-Fahm Football Club (Hebrew: מועדון כדורגל איחוד אום אל-פאחם) is an Israeli football club based in Umm al-Fahm. The club currently plays in the Liga Leumit.

== History ==
Established in 1963, at the start of the 1990s the club was playing in Liga Alef. At the end of the 1998–99 season they were relegated to Liga Bet North B. In 2005 they returned to Liga Alef.

After finishing as runners-up in Liga Alef North in 2006–07 under the management of Samir Issah, the following season the club won Liga Alef North and were promoted to Liga Artzit (then the third division). In the 2008–09 season they were relegated to Liga Alef and folded.

However, four years later, in 2013, the club returned after Ahva Umm al-Fahm, which was founded two years earlier and promoted to Liga Bet in their first season, was renamed to Hapoel Umm al-Fahm.

In 2016–17 season, the team promoted to Liga Alef, and two seasons later promoted to Liga Leumit.

In the eighth round of 2019–20 Israel State Cup the team defeated the champion Maccabi Tel Aviv 3–2 after Maccabi leaded 0–2, and qualified to the round of 16 there was defeated 0–1 to Maccabi Haifa.

== Stadium ==
After the club promoted to Liga Leumit played temporarily his home matches in Afula Illit Stadium. In 2023 the renovations in HaShalom Stadium done and the club returned to play his home matches there.

On 20 January 2023 Umm al-Fahm hosted his

== Current squad ==
As to 7 February 2025

No.	Pos.	Nation	Player
3	DF	ISR	Aviv Bitton
6	MF	ISR	Gal Kolani
7	MF	ISR	Abdallah Jabarin
10	FW	ISR	Idan Golan
11	MF	ISR	Noor Aladeen Jabarin
14	FW	ISR	Karem Arshid
15	DF	ISR	Shahar Tzafrir
17	MF	ISR	Bashar Mahagna
18	MF	ISR	Ilay Segev
20	MF	ISR	Habiballah Jabarin
25	DF	ISR	Ahmed Switat

No.	Pos.	Nation	Player
28	DF	ISR	Mohammed Awadeh
33	FW	ISR	Nasser Issa
55	GK	ISR	David Ben Lulu
66	DF	ISR	Jaber Jabarin
70	MF	ISR	Mohammed Mahamid
90	FW	ISR	Eden Ben Simon
—	GK	ISR	Yosef Mahamid
—	DF	ISR	Ahmed Jabarin
—	DF	ISR	Oudai Mahamid
—	DF	ISR	Niran Rotshtein

== Honours ==
=== League ===
Honour	No.	Years
Fourth tier	2	1978–79, 2007–08
Sixth Tier	1	2011–12
