= Maccabi Ironi Bat Yam F.C. =

Israeli football club

Ironi Bat Yam
- Full name: Maccabi Ironi Bat Yam Football Club
- Founded: 2004; 2018
- Dissolved: 2014; 2019 (merged with Beitar Tel Aviv)
- Ground: Bat Yam Municipal Stadium, Bat Yam
- Capacity: 3,100
- 2018–19: 6th
Home colours	Away colours

Maccabi Ironi Bat Yam (Hebrew: מכבי עירוני בת ים) was an Israeli football club based in Bat Yam. The club played home matches at the 3,100-capacity Bat Yam Municipal Stadium.

== History ==
The club was formed by a merger of Beitar Bat Yam and Maccabi Bat Yam. Following another merger, with Maccabi Holon, the club became known as Maccabi Holon Bat Yam and was placed in the South A division of Liga Bet. In 2004, after Hapoel Bat Yam dissolved, the club was renamed to Maccabi Ironi Bat Yam, and in its first season playing with that name, the club won the South A division, and was promoted to Liga Alef. In 2007–08 they won the South division of Liga Alef, and were promoted to Liga Artzit.

In 2008–09, the club was promoted to Liga Leumit, the second tier. In 2011–12 the club finished third bottom and relegated to Liga Alef.

The club dissolved at 25 August 2014, after chairman Yossi Elkobi gave the order to close the senior team, and did not register the club in the Israel Football Association.

== Honours ==
- Liga Alef
  - South Division champions 2007–08
- Liga Bet
  - South A Division champions 2004–05
