= Maccabi Sektzia Ma'alot-Tarshiha F.C. =

Israeli football club

Maccabi Sektzia Ma'alot-Tarshiha
- Full name: Maccabi Sektzia Ma'alot-Tarshiha Football Club מכבי סקציה מעלות תרשיחא
- Dissolved: 2024
- Ground: Municipal Stadium, Ma'alot-Tarshiha
- Owner: Gabi Simhon
- Chairman: Daniel Hazan
- Manager: Nissim Shayun
- League: Liga Bet North A
- 2023–24: Liga Bet North A, 13th
Home colours	Away colours

Maccabi Sektzia Ma'alot-Tarshiha (Hebrew: מכבי סקציה מעלות תרשיחא) is an Israeli football club based in Ma'alot-Tarshiha that currently plays in the Liga Alef North division.

== History ==
The club has mostly played in the lower divisions of Israeli football. In the 2004–05 season, they were promoted to Liga Alef for the first time after winning the Liga Bet North A North A division. They finished the debut season in Liga Alef North in 6th place, but were relegated back to Liga Bet in the following season after finishing bottom of Liga Alef North. In the 2010–11 season, the club won the Liga Bet North A division for the second time and returned to Liga Alef. In their comeback season in Liga Alef North, the club achieved their best placing to date, finishing in 4th place. However, they were once again relegated back to Liga Bet in the following season after another bottom finish.

The club made a remarkable run in the 2013–14 Israel State Cup while playing in Liga Bet, the fourth tier of Israeli football, after eliminating Liga Leumit clubs Hakoah Amidar Ramat Gan 3–0 and Hapoel Petah Tikva 2–1, reaching the Quarter-finals. There, they were defeated 8–0 by top flight club, Maccabi Petah Tikva at HaMoshava Stadium.

In the same season, the club finished third in Liga North A and qualified for the promotion play-offs. After beating F.C. Ahva Kafr Manda, Hapoel Shefa-'Amr, and Maccabi Ahi Iksal, they faced Hapoel Daliyat al-Karmel in the decisive promotion/relegation play-offs. Ma'alot won 6–5 on penalties after a goalless draw and were promoted to Liga Alef.

== Honours ==
- Liga Bet North A:
  - 2004–05, 2010–11
