= F.C. Kafr Qasim =

Israeli football club

S.C. Kafr Qasim
- Full name: Moadon Sport Kafr Qasim Sohayb
- Founded: 2002
- Ground: Bat Yam Municipal Stadium, Bat Yam
- Capacity: 2,800
- Chairman: Tareq Sarsour
- Manager: Asi Elimelech
- League: Liga Leumit
- 2025–26: Liga Leumit, 12th of 16
Home colours	Away colours

S.C. Kafr Qasim (Arabic: النادي الرياضي كفر قاسم صهيب, Ālnādī Ālrīyāḍī Kafr Qāsim Ṣohayb, Hebrew: מועדון ספורט כפר קאסם סוהיב, Moadon Sport Kafr Qasim Sohib, lit. 'Kafr Qasim Sohaib Sport Club'; or in short Hebrew: מ.ס. כפר קאסם, Mem Samekh Kafr Qasim, lit. 'S.C. Kafr Qasim') is an Israeli football club based in Kafr Qasim. The club currently plays in Liga Leumit, they play home matches at the Bat Yam Municipal Stadium in Bat Yam.

== History ==
A chart showing the progress of M.S. Kafr Qasim through the Israeli football league system, from 2019–20 to the present

The club was formed in 2002 by a merger of two city rivals from Kafr Qasim, Hapoel Kafr Qasim and Maccabi Kafr Qasim. In the new club's first season, they won the 2002–03 Liga Bet South A division, and were promoted to Liga Alef, where they spent three seasons, up until relegation in the 2005–06 season.

In the 2012–13 season, the club finished runners-up in Liga Bet South A division and qualified to the promotion play-offs. After four successful promotion play-offs matches against F.C. Bnei Jaffa Ortodoxim, Hapoel Bik'at HaYarden, F.C. Shikun HaMizrah and Hapoel Arad, the club won promotion to Liga Alef, exactly ten years after they did so in the previous time.

Kafr Qasim finished the 2013–14 season in Liga Alef South in the sixth place, four points short of the promotion play-offs.

In the two consecutive seasons 2015–2016 and 2016–2017 in Liga Alef FC. Kafr Qasim reached the Final game of the Promotion playoffs to the Liga Leumit against 14th place sides from Liga Leumit, but failed to win promotion in both cases.

They were promoted to the second division Liga Leumit in 2019 automatically from 1st place of Liga Alef South.

== Stadium ==
During the 2010s the club played in different stadiums like Lod Municipal Stadium and Winter Stadium.

These days Kfar Qassem Football Stadium undergoing renovations and will contain 8,000 seats.

== Current squad ==
As to 20 August, 2026

No.	Pos.	Nation	Player
1	GK	ISR	Noam Rudik
3	DF	ISR	Omri Amer
4	DF	ISR	Tareq Boshanek
5	DF	ISR	Karem Amer
7	FW	ISR	Noor Abdir
8	MF	ISR	Lidor Cohen
9	FW	BRA	Julio César
10	FW	ISR	Samah Mar'ab
11	FW	ISR	Ibrahim Badir
12	DF	ISR	Hadi Issa
15	MF	ISR	Mohammed Sarsour
16	MF	ISR	Mohammed Daouwd

No.	Pos.	Nation	Player
17	DF	ISR	Tareq Boshanek
19	MF	ISR	Zaffer Issa
20	DF	PLE	Ahmed Taha
22	GK	ISR	Raz Carmi
23	DF	ISR	Ahmed Taha
25	MF	ISR	Mohammed Taha
26	FW	ISR	Liam Atzmi
27	MF	GHA	Godfred Atuahene
30	FW	NGA	Christian Agu
33	FW	ISR	Ilay Tzeiri
77	GK	ISR	Khaled Amer
90	MF	ISR	Adham Swaed

== Honours ==
=== League ===
Honour	No.	Years
Third tier	1	2018–19
Fourth tier	2	1966–68^{1}, 1977–78^{1}
Fifth tier	1	2002–03

^{1}Achieved by Hapoel Kafr Qasim
