= Liga Bet =

- Founded: 1949; 77 years ago
- Country: Israel
- Confederation: UEFA (Europe)
- Divisions: 4
- Number of clubs: 64
- Level on pyramid: 4
- Promotion to: Liga Alef
- Relegation to: Liga Gimel
- Domestic cup: State Cup
- Current champions: Ihud Bnei Majd al-Krum (North A); Hapoel Bnei Fureidis (North B); Tzeirei Tayibe (South A); F.C. Dimona (South B) (2019–20)
- Website: (North A) (North B) (South A) (South B)
- Current: 2024–25 Liga Bet

Liga Bet (Hebrew: ליגה ב׳, lit. 'League B') is the fourth tier of the Israeli football league system. It is divided into four regional divisions.

== History ==
League football started in Israel in 1949–50, a year after the Israeli Declaration of Independence. However, the financial and security crises gripping the young nation caused the 1950–51 season to be abandoned before it had started. When football resumed in 1951–52, the new top division went by the name of Liga Alef with Liga Bet as the second division. The 1952–53 season was also not played, and Liga Bet resumed in 1953–54.

In the 1955–56 season, Liga Leumit came into existence as the new top division, with Liga Alef becoming the second division and Liga Bet demoted to the third division. Restructuring in 1976 saw the creation of Liga Artzit as a new second tier, and the second demotion of Liga Bet, as it became the fourth division. Further restructuring to create the Israeli Premier League in 1999 saw Liga Bet demoted again, this time to the fifth tier. At the end of the 2008–09 season, Liga Artzit was scrapped as the Premier League and Liga Leumit were expanded to 16 clubs each, resulting in Liga Bet returning to the fourth tier.

== Structure ==
Since the 1959–60 season, Liga Bet is split into four regional divisions, North A, North B, South A and South B. Because Israel's northern half is much more densely populated than the desert south, the divisions are not spread equally and the southernmost division, South B, covers about two-thirds of the country. Although this inequality is partially offset by the fact that there are so few clubs south of Beersheba (Arad, Dimona, Yeroham, Mitzpe Ramon and Eilat are the only sizable towns south of the city), the northern clubs tend to be clustered in the Galilee region, making travel to away matches much less of a chore.

Each division has sixteen clubs, who play each other home and away to make a 30-game season. The club finishing top of each regional division is promoted to Liga Alef, whilst the second to fifth-placed clubs in each division play-off at the end of the season, until the play-off winner of North A faces the play-off winner of North B, and the play-off winner of South A faces the play-off winner of South B. The two winners advance to a decisive match against the two third-bottom clubs in Liga Alef, North and South, for a place in that division. The club finishing bottom of each regional division is relegated to Liga Gimel, the fifth and bottom tier, whilst another club from each division is relegated after relegation play-offs, involving the clubs that finished twelfth to fifteenth in each division. Coming into Liga Bet are the two clubs are relegated from each of the regional Liga Alef divisions (and one or two more, had they failed the play-off) and the eight clubs promoted from Liga Gimel. The clubs are then pooled and assigned to the most geographically appropriate of the four divisions.

== Current members ==
The following teams participating at the 2026/2027 season:

North A	North B	South A	South B
Bnei Maghar	Beitar Haifa	A.S. Holon Mor	Beitar Kiryat Gat
F.C. Ahva Kfar Manda	F.C. Ironi Ariel	Beitar Kfar Saba	Beitar Mevaseret Zion
F.C. Bnei M.M.B.E.	F.C. Kababir	Beitar Petah Tikva	Bnei Eilat
F.C. Hapeol Yarka	F.C. Mashhad	Beitar Ramat Gan	F.C. Arad
F.C. Shefa-Amr	F.C. Netanya Kolat Cohen	Beitar Tel Aviv Holon	F.C. Hapoel Bnei Ashdod
F.C. Tzeirei Kfar Manda	F.C. Or Akiva	Bnei Jaljulia	F.C. Hapeol Yeruham
Hapoel Bnei Bi'ina	F.C. Tirat HaCarmel	Bnei Yehud	F.C. Maccabi Ashkelon
Hapoel Bnei Ein Mahil	F.C. Tzeirei Haifa	Hakoah Amidar Ramat Gan	F.C. Ramla
Hapoel Bnei Jadeidi-Makr	F.C. Tzofi Haifa Robi	Hapoel Kafr Qasim Shouaa	F.C. Shikun HaMizrah
Hapoel Deir Hanna	Hapoel Bnei Ar'ara 'Ara	Hapoel Hod HaSharon	Ihud Tzeiri Abu Ghosh
Hapoel Ihud Bnei Sumei	Hapoel Daliyat al-Karmel	Hapoel Kiryat Ono	Hapoel Bnei Kuseife
Hapoel Kaukab	Hapoel Giv'at Olga	Bnei Jaffa Ortodoxim	Hapoel Ironi Ashkelon
Maccabi Abu Snan	Hapoel Ramot Menashe Megiddo	F.C. Hapoel Lod Beni Regev	Hapoel Segev Shalom
Maccabi Ahva Sha'ab	Ihud Bnei Baqa	Maccabi Ironi Amishav Petah Tikva	Maccabi Be'er Sheva
Maccabi Bnei Jadeidi-Makr	Maccabi Ironi Kfer Yona	Maccabi Ramat HaSharon	Maccabi Ironi Netivot
Maccabi Ihud Bnei Ibtin	Maccabi Isfiya	Ironi Beit Dagan	Sektzia Ness Ziona

== Previous seasons ==
=== North A ===
Season	Winner	Relegated
Fourth tier
1998–99	Hapoel Hurfeish	Hapoel Karmiel, Beitar Tiberias, Hapoel Bu'eine
Fifth tier
1999–2000	Tzeirei Nahf (Note: Hapoel Kafr Sumei were also promoted as the best runners-up in Liga Bet North divisions.)	Maccabi Givat HaRakafot (Note: Hapoel Tel Hanan finished in the relegation zone but were transferred to the North B division.)
2000–01	Maccabi Ironi Shlomi	Hapoel Bnei Kafr Yasif, Beitar Safed, Hapoel Ironi I'billin
2001–02	Hapoel Tuba	Hapoel Ramot Menashe Megiddo (Note: Season played with only 15 teams.)
2002–03	Hapoel Makr	Maccabi Bnei Yarka, Hapoel Kisra (Note: Hapoel Sakhnin finished bottom but were not demoted.)
2003–04	Hapoel Bnei Jadeidi	Maccabi Bir al-Maksur (Note: Beitar Acre finished bottom but were not demoted.)
2004–05	Maccabi Sektzia Ma'alot-Tarshiha (Note: Hapoel Umm al-Fahm were also promoted after play-off victory over Maccabi Shefa-'Amr of Liga Alef North.)	Beitar Acre, Maccabi Majd al-Krum
2005–06	Beitar Safed (Note: Beitar Haifa were also promoted after play-off victory over Maccabi Tamra of Liga Alef North.)	Hapoel Ironi I'billin (Note: Hapoel Deir Hana finished in the relegation zone but were not demoted as both teams relegated from the northern division of Liga Alef folded.)
2006–07	Beitar Ihud Mashhad	Hapoel Kisra, Hapoel Deir Hana
2007–08	Ahva Arraba (Note: Maccabi Tamra were also promoted after play-off victory over Beitar Haifa of Liga Alef North.)	Maccabi Kafr Yasif, Hapoel Yanuh
2008–09	Maccabi Ironi Jatt	Bnei Abu Snan, Beitar Kafr Kanna
Fourth tier
2009–10	Ahi Acre	Maccabi Ironi Kabul, Hapoel Halat al-Sharif Tamra
2010–11	Maccabi Sektzia Ma'alot-Tarshiha	Hapoel Nahariya, Maccabi Kafr Sumei
2011–12	Tzeirei Bir al-Maksur (Note: There was no automatic promotion in the 2011–12 season. Tzeirei Bir al-Maksur lost in promotion play-offs to Hapoel Migdal HaEmek of North B and to Hapoel Hadera of Liga Alef North and remained in Liga Bet.)	Maccabi Ironi Tirat HaCarmel, Hapoel Bnei Jadeidi
2012–13	Beitar Nahariya	Hapoel Ahva Haifa, Tzeirei Bir al-Maksur
2013–14	Ihud Bnei Majd al-Krum (Note: Maccabi Sektzia Ma'alot-Tarshiha were also promoted after play-off victory over Hapoel Daliyat al-Karmel of Liga Alef North.)	Maccabi Tamra, Bnei Arraba
2014–15	Hapoel Kafr Kanna	Ahva Arraba, Hapoel Ironi Bnei I'billin
2015–16	Tzeirei Kafr Kanna	Ahi Bir al-Maksur, Hapoel Bnei Maghar

=== North B ===
Season	Winner	Relegated
Fourth tier
1998–99	Maccabi Hadera	Hapoel Ilut, Maccabi Umm al-Fahm
Fifth tier
1999–2000	Maccabi Ironi Tirat HaCarmel	Ironi Zikhron Ya'akov, Hapoel Barta'a, Maccabi Beit She'an
2000–01	Hapoel Asi Gilboa	Hapoel Arab Nujeidat, Beitar Iksal, Ironi Sayid Umm al-Fahm
2001–02	Maccabi Tzur Shalom	Hapoel Baqa al-Gharbiyye, Maccabi Baqa al-Gharbiyye, Hapoel Fureidis
2002–03	Hapoel Reineh	Hapoel Nahliel (Note: Hapoel Bnei Nazareth finished in the relegation zone but were not demoted.)
2003–04	Hapoel Afula	Hapoel Bnei Nazareth (Note: Maccabi Daliyat al-Karmel finished in the relegation zone but were not demoted.)
2004–05	Hapoel Bnei Tamra	None (Note: Maccabi Daliyat al-Karmel and Hapoel Kafr Misr/Nein finished in the relegation zone but were not demoted.)
2005–06	Hapoel Ahva Haifa	Hapoel Kafr Misr/Nein
2006–07	Ironi Sayid Umm Al-Fahm (Note: Ironi Tiberias were also promoted after play-off victory over Hapoel Kafr Sumei of Liga Alef North.)	Maccabi Daliyat al-Karmel, Hapoel Tel Hanan
2007–08	Maccabi Kafr Qara	Hapoel Yokneam, Maccabi Or Akiva
2008–09	Maccabi Umm al-Fahm	Hapoel Deir el-Asad, Maccabi Sha'ab
Fourth tier
2009–10	Hapoel Daliyat al-Karmel (Note: Hapoel Ramot Menashe Megiddo were also promoted after play-off victory over Hapoel Bnei Jadeidi of Liga Alef North.)	Beitar Ihud Mashhad, Hapoel Bnei Musmus Ma'ale Iron
2010–11	Maccabi Daliyat al-Karmel (Note: F.C. Givat Olga were also promoted after play-off victory over Ironi Sayid Umm al-Fahm of Liga Alef North.)	Hapoel Ironi Ar'ara, Hapoel Bnei Jisr az-Zarqa
2011–12	Hapoel Migdal HaEmek	Maccabi Or Akiva, Maccabi Ironi Barta'a
2012–13	Hapoel Beit She'an Mesilot	F.C. Kafr Kama, Ihud Bnei Baqa
2013–14	Ironi Nesher	Hapoel Isfiya, F.C. Bu'eine
2014–15	Hapoel Ironi Baqa al-Gharbiyye (Note: Hapoel Iksal were also promoted after play-off victory over Hapoel Asi Gilboa of Liga Alef North.)	Hapoel Bnei Nujeidat, Hapoel Umm al-Ghanem Nein
2015–16	F.C Haifa Robi Shapira	Ihud Bnei Baqa, F.C. Pardes Hanna-Karkur

=== South A ===
Season	Winner	Relegated
Fourth tier
1998–99	Hapoel Kiryat Ono	Maccabi Qalansawe, Hapoel Tel Mond, Maccabi Aharon Holon
Fifth tier
1999–2000	Hapoel Herzliya ^{1}	Hapoel Ar'ara
2000–01	Hapoel Tira	Maccabi Bnei Tira, Maccabi Kafr Qasim
2001–02	Maccabi HaShikma Ramat Hen	Beitar Holon, Hapoel Kafr Qasim, Maccabi Qalansawe, Beitar Ariel, Beitar Nes Tubruk ^{2}
2002–03	F.C. Kafr Qasim	Shimshon Bnei Tayibe ^{3}
2003–04	Hapoel Qalansawe	M.M. Giv'at Shmuel, Maccabi Montefiore ^{4}
2004–05	Ironi Bat Yam	Maccabi Bnei Tira, Beitar Kiryat Ono
2005–06	Maccabi Amishav Petah Tikva	Beitar Jaffa, A.S. Holon
2006–07	Maccabi Ironi Kfar Yona ^{5}	Hapoel Kiryat Ono, Hapoel Ihud Bnei Jaffa
2007–08	Hapoel Hadera	Beitar Pardes Hanna, Hapoel Qalansawe
2008–09	Shimshon Bnei Tayibe ^{6}	Hapoel Hod HaSharon, Maccabi Ironi Or Yehuda
Fourth tier
2009–10	Maccabi Kabilio Jaffa	Otzma Holon, Hapoel Ramat Yisrael
2010–11	Beitar Kfar Saba	Beitar Petah Tikva, Hapoel Oranit
2011–12	Hapoel Azor	Hapoel Pardesiya, Shimshon Bnei Tayibe
2012–13	Hapoel Mahane Yehuda ^{7}	Gadna Tel Aviv, Shikun Vatikim Ramat Gan
2013–14	Hapoel Morasha Ramat HaSharon ^{8}	Maccabi HaSharon Netanya, Shimshon Bnei Tayibe
2014–15	Hapoel Bik'at HaYarden	Maccabi Bnei Jaljulia, Otzma Holon
2015–16	F.C. Bnei Jaffa Ortodoxim ^{9}	Hapoel Tzafririm Holon, Ironi Beit Dagan

^{1} Hapoel Jaljulia were also promoted as the second best runners-up in Liga Bet South divisions, after one spot vacated in Liga Alef South.

^{2} Season played with 18 teams.

^{3} Maccabi Yehud finished in the relegation zone but were not demoted.

^{4} Maccabi Yehud finished bottom but were transferred to Liga Bet South B.

^{5} Beitar Kfar Saba were also promoted as the best runners-up in Liga Bet South divisions, after one spot vacated in Liga Alef South as Hapoel Maxim Lod folded.

^{6} Maccabi Amishav Petah Tikva were also promoted as the best runners-up in Liga Bet South divisions, after one spot vacated in Liga Alef South as Hapoel Umm al-Fahm folded.

^{7} F.C. Kafr Qasim were also promoted after play-off victory over Hapoel Arad of Liga Alef South.

^{8} Hapoel Hod HaSharon were also promoted after play-off victory over Maccabi Be'er Sheva of Liga Alef South.

^{9} F.C. Tira were also promoted after play-off victory over Maccabi Amishav Petah Tikva of Liga Alef South.

=== South B ===
Season	Winner	Relegated
Fourth tier
1998–99	A.S. Ramat Eliyahu	Beitar Beit Shemesh
Fifth tier
1999–2000	Hapoel Marmorek^{1}	None
2000–01	Ironi Ofakim ^{2}	Hapoel Rahat ^{3}
2001–02	Maccabi Be'er Sheva	Tzeirei Rahat, Maccabi Neve Alon Lod, Hapoel Aliyah Kfar Saba
2002–03	Beitar Giv'at Ze'ev	Hapoel Rahat, Hapoel Sde Uzziah
2003–04	Hapoel Bnei Lod	None ^{4}
2004–05	Hapoel Arad ^{5}	None ^{6}
2005–06	Hapoel Maxim Lod ^{7} ^{8}	Maccabi Yehud ^{9}
2006–07	Maccabi Ironi Netivot	Maccabi Kiryat Ekron, Hapoel Bnei Lakhish
2007–08	Hapoel Masos/Segev Shalom ^{10}	Hapoel Tel Sheva, Hapoel Oranit
2008–09	Hapoel Tzafririm Holon	Hapoel F.C. Hevel Modi'in, Hapoel Jaljulia
Fourth tier
2009–10	Bnei Eilat	Maccabi Be'er Ya'akov, Hapoel Tirat Shalom
2010–11	Hapoel Katamon Jerusalem ^{11}	Beitar Giv'at Ze'ev, Ironi Ramla
2011–12	Maccabi Sha'arayim	Maccabi Ironi Sderot, Hapoel Mevaseret Zion
2012–13	Maccabi Be'er Ya'akov	Hapoel Merhavim, Bnei Yehud
2013–14	F.C. Shikun HaMizrah	Maccabi Ironi Sderot, Hapoel Abirei Bat Yam
2014–15	Bnei Eilat	F.C. Bnei Ra'anana, Hapoel Arad
2015–16	F.C. Dimona	Hapoel Merhavim, Hapoel Rahat

^{1} Maccabi Jerusalem/Ma'ale Adumim were also promoted as the best runners-up in Liga Bet South divisions.

^{2} Beitar Kiryat Gat were also promoted as the best runners-up in Liga Bet South divisions.

^{3} Hapoel Aliyah Kfar Saba finished in the relegation zone but were not demoted.

^{4} Maccabi Kiryat Ekron and Hapoel Oranit finished in the relegation zone but were not demoted.

^{5} Ironi Nes Tziona were also promoted after play-off victory over Beitar Giv'at Ze'ev of Liga Alef South.

^{6} Tzeirei Rahat and Maccabi Yehud finished in the relegation zone but were not demoted.

^{7} Ironi Ramla were also promoted after play-off victory over Maccabi Sha'arayim of Liga Alef South.

^{8} Maccabi Kiryat Malakhi were also promoted due to the merger of Liga Alef South clubs, Beitar Kiryat Gat and Maccabi Kiryat Gat.

^{9} Hapoel Bnei Lakhish finished in the relegation zone but were not demoted.

^{10} Hapoel Arad were also promoted after play-off victory over Hapoel Tzafririm Holon of Liga Alef South.

^{11} Hapoel F.C. Ortodoxim Lod were also promoted after play-off victory over Hapoel Nahlat Yehuda of Liga Alef South.
