= Hapoel Bnei Jadeidi F.C. =

Hapoel Bnei Jadeidi
- Full name: Hapoel Bnei Jadeidi Football Club מועדון כדורגל בני-ג'דידה
- Founded: 2001
- Dissolved: 2014
- Ground: Jadeidi Stadium, Jadeidi-Makr
- 2012–13: Liga Gimel Upper Galilee, 13th
Home colours	Away colours

Hapoel Bnei Jadeidi Football Club (Hebrew: מועדון כדורגל הפועל בני-ג'דידה) was an Israeli football club based in Jadeidi-Makr. The club played their home matches at the Jadeidi Stadium in Jadeidi-Makr. Between 2008 and 2009, the club played in Liga Artzit, the third tier of Israeli football at the time. During their spell in Liga Artzit, they played at the Municipal Stadium in Nahariya, in which they shared with Hapoel Nahariya and Beitar Nahariya.

== History ==
In 2003–04 the club won the North A Division of Liga Bet and were promoted to Liga Alef. In 2006–07 they won the North Division of Liga Alef, and were promoted to Liga Artzit. The following season they finished third in Liga Artzit, one place below the promotion places.

At the end of the 2008–09 season they were relegated to Liga Alef, and in 2009–10 dropped into Liga Bet after finishing second bottom of their division and lost the relegation play-offs. Just a season later in 2010–11 they were demoted again, this time to Liga Gimel after finishing last in Liga Bet.

In the 2013–14 season of Liga Gimel Lower Galilee division, the club withdrew after playing 15 matches. As they failed to show up for two matches in a row, the Israel Football Association ceased the club's activity and their results were annulled.

== Honours ==
=== League ===
Honour	No.	Years
Fourth tier	2	1966–68^{1}, 2006–07
Third tier	1	2003–04

^{1}As Hapoel Jadeidi F.C.
