= Hapoel Arad F.C. =

Hapoel Arad
- Full name: Hapoel Arad Football Club הפועל ערד
- Founded: 1965
- Dissolved: 2015
- Ground: Municipal Stadium, Arad
- Capacity: 4,000
- 2013–14: Liga Bet South B, 13th
Home colours	Away colours

Hapoel Arad (Hebrew: הפועל ערד) was an Israeli football club based in Arad.

== History ==
The club was founded in 1965 and played mostly in the lower divisions of Israeli football. In the 2004–05 season the club won Liga Bet South B division and were promoted to Liga Alef. Hapoel Arad finished their debut season in Liga Alef South division in the sixth place. However, they were relegated back to Liga Bet, after bottom finish in the following season. The club finished runners-up in Liga Bet South B division in the following season and made an immediate return to Liga Alef, through the Promotion play-offs, after they defeated Hapoel Tzafririm Holon in the decisive match, by a result of 4–1. Hapoel Arad played five seasons more in Liga Alef, up until the 2012–13 season when they finished third bottom, and relegated to Liga Bet, following a defeat in penalties to F.C. Kafr Qasim, after a goalless draw in the Relegation play-offs.

In the 2014–15 season of Liga Bet South B division, the club withdrew after playing 14 matches, due to major financial problems. The club players were released, and the club was dissolved at 14 January 2015.

== Honours ==
=== League ===
Honour	No.	Years
Fifth tier	2	1986–87, 2004–05
