= Maccabi Ironi Netivot F.C. =

Israeli football club

Maccabi Ironi Netivot
- Full name: Maccabi Ironi Netivot Football Club מכבי עירוני נתיבות
- Founded: 2002
- Ground: Municipal Stadium, Netivot
- President: Israel Shriki
- Manager: Avi Buhbut
- League: Liga Bet South B
- 2024–25: Liga Bet South B, 8th
Home colours	Away colours

Maccabi Ironi Netivot (Hebrew: מכבי עירוני נתיבות) is an Israeli football club based in Netivot. The club is currently in Liga Bet South B division.

== History ==
The club was founded in 2002, after the previous football club of the city, Hapoel Netivot, which have played in Liga Gimel South division, up until the 2000–01 season, was dissolved, following eight matches suspension due to crowd trouble.

Maccabi Ironi Netivot won Liga Gimel South division in the 2003–04 season and were promoted to Liga Bet, and in the 2006–07 season, they won Liga Bet South B division, and were promoted to Liga Alef.

In the 2008–09 season, which was the last season of Liga Alef as the fourth tier of Israeli football, as Liga Artzit was scrapped, the club was close to achieve promotion to Liga Leumit, the second tier or Israeli football. however, they finished runners-up in Liga Alef South, two points behind champions, Maccabi Be'er Sheva, and remained in Liga Alef. the club played in Liga Alef until the 2011–12 season, when they finished second bottom, and relegated to Liga Bet, following a defeat of 0–1 to Hapoel Azor in the Relegation play-offs.

== Honours ==
- Liga Bet South B:
  - 2006–07
- Liga Gimel South:
  - 2003–04
