= Maccabi Ironi Kfar Yona F.C. =

Israeli football club

Maccabi Ironi Kfar Yona
- Full name: Maccabi Ironi Kfar Yona Football Club מכבי עירוני כפר יונה
- Founded: 1964
- Ground: Kfar Yona Stadium, Kfar Yona
- Chairman: Ronen Ben Gigi
- Manager: Yaron Timor
- League: Liga Gimel
- 2023–24: Liga Gimel Sharon, 5th
Home colours	Away colours

Maccabi Ironi Kfar Yona (Hebrew: מכבי עירוני כפר יונה) is an Israeli football club based in Kfar Yona. The club is currently in Liga Bet South A division.

== History ==
The club was founded in 1964 as Maccabi Kfar Yona and played mostly in the lower divisions of Israeli football. In the 2006–07 season the club won Liga Bet South A division and were promoted to Liga Alef. Maccabi Ironi Kfar Yona played six seasons in Liga Alef South division, until they were relegated back to Liga Bet after the last match of the 2012–13 season, following a defeat of 2–3 to Maccabi Kabilio Jaffa.

The club had attempted to return to Liga Alef in the following season and after third-place finish in Liga Bet South A division, they qualified for the Promotion play-offs, where they beat Hapoel Kiryat Ono by a result of 4–2 in the first round; However, in the second round, they lost 0–3 after extra time to Hapoel Hod HaSharon, and remained in Liga Bet.

== Honours ==
- Liga Bet South A
  - Champions 2006–07
