= Beitar Haifa F.C. =

Israeli football club

Beitar Haifa
- Full name: Beitar Haifa Football Club
- Founded: 1939
- Ground: Mitham Beitar, Haifa
- Owner: Shabtay Waire
- Manager: Eli Zahavi
- League: Liga Bet North B
- 2024–25: Liga Bet North B, 6th
Home colours	Away colours

Beitar Haifa F.C. (Hebrew: מ.כ. בית״ר חיפה) is an Israeli football club based in Haifa. The club currently plays in the North A division of Liga Bet. Their main rivals are Hapoel Ahva Haifa.

== History ==
The club was founded in 1939 and played mostly in the lower divisions of Israeli football.

During its early days, Beitar played mostly against other Haifa region teams and military teams.

After the Israeli Declaration of Independence, Beitar joined Liga Gimel of the Israel Football Association In 1953. The club reached Liga Bet following a merger with another club from Haifa, Beitar Tel Amal, in the 1960–61 season. In the 1963–64 season they finished runners-up in Liga Bet North A division and were promoted for the first time in their history to Liga Alef (then the second division). In 1965–66, they finished bottom of the league and were relegated back to Liga Bet. At the end of the 1966–68 season they dropped further tier, to Liga Gimel, and eventually folded, while its players were released for Beitar Kiryat Tiv'on, following an order from Beitar sports association.

In the early 1970s, the club was re-established. In the early 1980s, The club started a progress after they won Liga Gimel Haifa division in the 1979–80 season and were promoted to Liga Bet. In the following season won Liga Bet North B division and were promoted to Liga Alef. In 1982–83, they won Liga Alef North division, after being undefeated throughout the entire season, and were promoted to Liga Artzit (then the second division). Thus, they achieved three promotions within four years. After finished 9th in 1983–84 and 13th in 1984–85, In 1985–86 they finished bottom of Liga Artzit, winning only two league matches all season, and were relegated back to Liga Alef. In 1989–90 Beitar finished bottom of Liga Alef North division and were relegated to Liga Bet. In 1992–93 they dropped into Liga Gimel.

In 2001–02 the club finished second in the Haifa division of Liga Gimel, and were promoted back to Liga Bet. In 2005–06 they finished second in Liga Bet North A division and were promoted to Liga Alef after play-off victory over Maccabi Tamra. They were relegated back to Liga Bet at the end of the 2007–08 season, this time after they lost to Maccabi Tamra in the relegation play-offs.

== Honours ==
=== League ===
Honour	No.	Years
Third tier	1	1982–83
Fourth tier	1	1980–81
Fifth tier	1	1979–80

=== Cups ===
Honour	No.	Years
Liga Bet divisional State Cup	1	2011–12
