= Maccabi Ironi Tamra F.C. =

Israeli football club

- Full name: Hebrew: מכבי עירוני טמרה
- Founded: 1965
- Ground: Tamra Ground, Tamra
- Manager: Ayman Khalaila
- League: Liga Bet North
- 2023–24: Liga Alef North, 16th (relegated)
Home colours	Away colours

Maccabi Ironi Tamra F.C. (Hebrew: מכבי עירוני טמרה) is an Israeli football club based in Tamra. The club currently plays in Liga Alef North division.

== History ==
The club was founded in 1965 and played in the lower divisions of Israeli football until the 1980s, when the club enjoyed a period of success, after they won Liga Bet North A division in the 1983–84 season, and were promoted to Liga Alef, and later, won Liga Alef North in the 1987–88 season, and made historic promotion to Liga Artzit, the second tier of Israeli football at the time.

In 1988–89, their debut season in Liga Artzit, the club finished in the 10th place out of 14. However, in the following season, they finished third bottom (14th out of 16), and dropped back to Liga Alef, after losing 0–1 after extra time to Ironi Ashdod in the Promotion-relegation play-off match.

During their spell in Liga Artzit, the club was managed by Eli Guttman, who would later become manager of Hapoel Tel Aviv and the Israel national team.

The club was last relegated from Liga Alef at the end of the 2011–12 season, after second finish at last place in Liga Alef North. at the end of the 2013–14 season, they were relegated to Liga Gimel, the fifth and lowest tier of Israeli football, after losing the Liga Bet North A relegation play-offs against Hapoel Bnei Maghar and Hapoel Sakhnin.

== Honours ==
- Liga Alef North:
  - 1987–88
- Liga Bet North A:
  - 1983–84, 1992–93, 2018–19
- Liga Gimel Bay Area:
  - 1980–81, 2017–18
