= List of Hapoel Jerusalem F.C. seasons =

This is a list of seasons played by Hapoel Jerusalem Football Club in Israeli and European football, from 1928 (when the club joined the newly founded EIFA) to the most recent completed season. It details the club's achievements in major competitions, and the top scorers for each season. Top scorers in bold were also the top scorers in the Israeli league that season. Records of minor competitions such as the Lilian Cup are not included due to them being considered of less importance than the State Cup and the Toto Cup.

The club has won the State Cup once. Its best ever position in the top division was achieved in 1972–73, when the club finished third. The club has never been out of the three top divisions of Israeli football.

== History ==
Hapoel Jerusalem Football Club was established in 1926. In 1928 the club joined the EIFA and competed in its competitions ever since. The club played in Palestine League during the league's first four seasons, however, as travelling was limited, the club competed mainly in Jerusalem during the British Mandate, rejoining the national league after the establishment of Israel. The club was promoted to the top division in 1957, where he stayed until the end of the 1978–79 season, bouncing between the two top division for the next two decades. In 2001 the club dropped to the third division for the first time in its history, bouncing back up the following season. Aside from two seasons played in the third tier, the club played in Liga Leumit since.

The club had appeared in the State Cup final four times, the first in 1943, winning once, in 1973.

== Seasons ==
Season	League									State Cup	League Cup	Europe	Top goalscorer (Note: Goals in all competitions (Liga Leumit or Liga Al, State Cup, Toto Cup and European) are counted.)	
Season	Division	P	W	D	L	F	A	Pts	Pos	State Cup	League Cup	Europe	Name	Goals
1927–28	–	–	–	–	–	–	–	–	–	R1	–	–		
1928–29	–	–	–	–	–	–	–	–	–	R2	–	–		
1929–30	–	–	–	–	–	–	–	–	–	–	–	–		
1930–31	Pal. League (Note: The 1930–31 league season was abandoned after several weeks due to tensions between the British Mandate government and the Jewish community following the publication of the Passfield white paper.)	3	0	0	3	0	17	0	11th	–	–	–		
1931–32	Pal. League	13	1	1	11	11	60	3	9th	–	–	–		
1932–33	–	–	–	–	–	–	–	–	–	QF	–	–		
1933–34	Pal. League	13	0	3	10	10	35	3	8th	R1	–	–		
1934–35	Pal. League (Note: The 1934–35 league season was stopped to allow Maccabi club to prepare for the 1935 Maccabiah Games and wasn't renewed due to disagreement between Maccabi and Hapoel)	7	0	0	7	0	19	0	10th	–	–	–		
1935–36	–	–	–	–	–	–	–	–	–	– (Note: After three matches played in the first round the competition was abandoned due to the Arab Revolt.)	–	–		
1936–37	–	–	–	–	–	–	–	–	–	R1	–	–		
1937–38	–	–	–	–	–	–	–	–	–	–	–	–		
1938–39	–	–	–	–	–	–	–	–	–	–	–	–		
1939–40	–	–	–	–	–	–	–	–	–	–	–	–		
1940–41	–	–	–	–	–	–	–	–	–	R1	–	–		
1941–42	Pal. League; Jerusalem (Note: The 1941–42 league season was held in three regional divisions followed by a play-off. The league season was lasted until fall 1943.)	14	8	3	3	28	12	19	3rd	R1	–	–		
1942–43	Pal. League; Jerusalem	14	8	3	3	28	12	19	3rd	Final	–	–		
1943–44	–	–	–	–	–	–	–	–	–	R2 (Note: The 1944 cup competitions began on 5 February 1944 and was completed during the following season, on 13 January 1945.)	–	–		
1944–45	–	–	–	–	–	–	–	–	–	R2	–	–		
1945–46	–	–	–	–	–	–	–	–	–	SF	–	–		
1946–47	Bet South	–	–	–	–	–	–	–	– (Note: The club had registered to play in Liga Bet, but withdrew before the season started.)	R2	–	–		
1947–48	Bet South (Note: The 1947–48 league was abandoned due to the 1948 Arab–Israeli War.)	3	2	0	1	7	4	4	6th	–	–	–		
1948–49	–	–	–	–	–	–	–	–	–	– (Note: The 1949 cup competition was delayed by appeals after the completion of the quarter-finals. After settling the appeals three further matches were played in February 1951, after which the competition was abandoned.)	–	–		
1949–50	Meuhedet; Jer./South	16	13	1	2	48	13	27	1st	–	–	–		
1950–51	–	–	–	–	–	–	–	–	–	–	–	–		
1951–52	Bet; South	26	17	3	6	56	27	37	4th	R3	–	–		
1952–53	–	–	–	–	–	–	–	–	–	Round of 16	–	–		
1953–54	Bet; South	26	15	3	8	75	36	33	4th	Round of 16	–	–		
1954–55	Bet; South	22	13	6	3	60	31	32	3rd	R3	–	–		
1955–56	Alef	22	9	7	6	38	33	25	3rd	–	–	–		
1956–57	Alef	22	12	6	4	47	26	30	3rd (Note: Due to suspicions of foulplay, the top five clubs in Liga Alef played a promotion playoff. Hapoel Jerusalem finished second in the playoff and was promoted to Liga Leumit.)	R5	–	–		
1957–58	Leumit	22	6	6	10	20	28	18	10th	QF	–	–		
1958–59	Leumit	22	5	6	11	17	32	16	10th	Round of 16	Final	–		
1959–60	Leumit	22	9	7	6	28	27	25	4th	Round of 16	–	–		
1960–61	Leumit	22	9	3	10	29	26	21	7th	Round of 16	–	–		
1961–62	Leumit	22	8	7	7	26	25	23	6th	R5	–	–		
1962–63	Leumit	22	9	3	10	21	24	21	6th	R4	–	–		
1963–64	Leumit	28	6	8	14	27	46	20	14th	R5	–	–		
1964–65	Leumit	30	9	10	11	32	39	28	13th	Round of 16	–	–		
1965–66	Leumit	30	9	10	11	29	40	28	12th	Round of 16	–	–		
1966–67	Leumit	60	24	18	18	66	55	66	6th	QF	–	–		
1967–68	Leumit	60	24	18	18	66	55	66	6th	R5	–	–		
1968–69	Leumit	30	10	11	9	39	31	31	6th	Round of 16	SF	–		
1969–70	Leumit	30	10	10	10	29	29	30	6th	QF	–	–		
1970–71	Leumit	30	10	10	10	39	32	30	7th	QF	–	–		
1971–72	Leumit	30	9	10	11	30	32	28	8th	Final	–	–		
1972–73	Leumit	30	13	10	7	30	19	36	3rd	Winners	Group	–		
1973–74	Leumit	30	6	16	8	21	24	28	10th	R5	–	–		
1974–75	Leumit	30	14	5	11	30	25	33	5th	QF	–	–		
1975–76	Leumit	34	12	10	12	39	39	34	13th	R4	SF	–		
1976–77	Leumit	30	8	12	10	24	25	28	10th	Round of 16	–	–		
1977–78	Leumit	26	9	8	9	27	22	26	6th	R7	–	–		
1978–79	Leumit	30	5	13	12	18	26	23	15th	R7	–	–		
1979–80	Artzit	30	15	12	3	37	13	42	1st	R7	–	–		
1980–81	Leumit	30	9	13	8	30	25	31	9th	Round of 16	–	–		
1981–82	Leumit	30	8	13	9	24	26	29	10th	R7	–	–		
1982–83	Leumit	30	8	7	15	29	44	31	15th	QF	–	–		
1983–84	Artzit	30	11	7	12	36	40	40	8th	R7	–	–		
1984–85	Artzit	30	15	9	6	39	11	54	3rd	R7	Group	–		
1985–86	Leumit	30	8	6	16	31	45	30	14th	Round of 16	Group	–		
1986–87	Artzit	30	15	8	7	36	24	53	2nd	Round of 16	Group	–		
1987–88	Artzit	33	22	5	6	61	32	71	1st	Round of 16	Group	–		
1988–89	Leumit	33	12	11	10	28	27	46 (Note: Hapoel Jerusalem were deducted one point for violation of budgetary regulations.)	7th	R8	Group	–		
1989–90	Leumit	32	9	12	11	29	35	39	8th	R8	Group	–		
1990–91	Artzit	32	9	11	12	31	38	38	10th	R8	SF	–		
1991–92	Leumit	32	6	5	21	27	81	23	12th	R8	Group	–		
1992–93	Artzit	30	10	7	13	29	38	37	8th	R7	Group	–		
1993–94	Artzit	30	8	12	10	30	34	36	10th	R8	Group	–		
1994–95	Artzit	30	9	9	12	44	50	36	13th	R7	Group	–		
1995–96	Artzit	30	15	9	6	43	24	54	2nd	R8	Group	–		
1996–97	Leumit	30	9	7	14	29	34	34	12th	Round of 16	Group	–		
1997–98	Leumit	30	8	10	12	35	45	34	11th	Final	Group	–		
1998–99	Leumit	30	11	5	14	35	52	38	9th	Round of 16	Group	–		
1999–2000	Premier	39	6	6	27	33	82	24	14th	R8	R2	–		
2000–01	Leumit	38	8	11	19	37	67	35	12th	R8	R2	–		
2001–02	Artzit	33	18	9	6	48	20	63	1st	Round of 16	Group	–		
2002–03	Leumit	33	15	12	6	64	41	57	3rd	R8	Group	–		
2003–04	Leumit	33	10	13	10	30	37	43	6th	Round of 16	Group	–		
2004–05	Leumit	33	14	6	13	39	41	47 (Note: Hapoel Jerusalem were deducted one point.)	4th	R9	QF	–		
2005–06	Leumit	33	13	10	10	45	40	49	5th	R9	Group	–		
2006–07	Leumit	33	7	12	14	28	46	30	12th	R9	Group	–	Shay Aharon	15
2007–08	Artzit	33	20	10	3	49	19	70	1st	R8	Group	–	Shay Aharon	15
2008–09	Leumit	33	9	10	14	32	40	37	10th	R9	QF	–	Shay Aharon	16
2009–10	Leumit	35	6	11	18	40	66	18 (Note: Hapoel Jerusalem achieved 23 points in the regular season, which were halved at the beginning of the play-offs. The club scored 6 more points during the play-offs for a total of 29 points.)	15th	R7	Group	–	Shay Aharon	21
2010–11	Alef; South	30	21	6	3	56	18	69	1st	Round of 16	–	–	Adam Mizrahi	18
2011–12	Leumit	35	13	8	14	44	40	25 (Note: Hapoel Jerusalem achieved 44 points in the regular season, which were halved at the beginning of the play-offs. The club scored 3 more points during the play-offs for a total of 47 points.)	6th	Round of 16	SF	–	Adam Mizrahi	18
2012–13	Leumit	37	15	12	10	48	39	57	4th	R7	Group	–	Itzik Cohen	21
2013–14	Leumit	37	11	16	10	47	39	49	12th	R7	–	–	Idan Sade	10
2014–15	Leumit	37	12	14	11	47	47	50	9th	R7	Group	–	Nevo Mizrahi	11
2015–16	Leumit	37	9	13	15	39	50	40	14th	R7	QF	–	Gaëtan Varenne	10

== Key ==
- P = Played
- W = Games won
- D = Games drawn
- L = Games lost
- F = Goals for
- A = Goals against
- Pts = Points
- Pos = Final position
- Premier = Ligat HaAl
  (Premier League) (1st tier since 2000)
- Leumit = Liga Leumit
  (1st tier 1955 to 2000; 2nd tier since 2000)
- Artzit = Liga Artzit
  (2nd tier 1977 to 2000; 3rd tier 2000 to 2009)
- Alef = Liga Alef
  (1st tier 1947 to 1955; 2nd tier 1955 to 1977; 3rd tier 1977 to 2000 and since 2009)
- Pal. League = Palestine League
- R1 = Round 1
- R2 = Round 2
- R3 = Round 3
- R4 = Round 4
- R5 = Round 5
- R6 = Round 6
- R7 = Round 7
- R8 = Round 8
- R9 = Round 9
- QF = Quarter-finals
- SF = Semi-finals
- Group = Group stage

Champions	Runners-up	Promoted	Relegated
