= Ahmad Saba'a =

Israeli footballer

Ahmad Saba'a أحمد سبع
Personal information
- Full name: Ahmad Saba'a
- Date of birth: 24 May 1980 (age 46)
- Place of birth: Majd al-Kurum, Israel
- Position: Striker

Team information
- Current team: Hapoel Bnei Zalafa (manager)

Youth career
- Hapoel Majd al-Krum

Senior career*
Years	Team	Apps	(Gls)
1997–2002	Hapoel Majd al-Krum		
2002–2003	Hapoel Acre	20	(10)
2003–2009	Hapoel Bnei Lod	149	(61)
2009–2013	Maccabi Netanya	124	(51)
2013–2014	Ironi Kiryat Shmona	6	(0)
2014	Hapoel Ra'anana	3	(0)
2014	Hapoel Bnei Lod	7	(0)
2014–2015	Ihud Bnei Majd al-Kurum	6	(1)
2015	Hilal Al-Quds	0	(0)
2015–2016	Hapoel Kafr Kanna	27	(6)

Managerial career
- 2014–2015: Ihud Bnei Majd al-Krum
- 2016–2017: Ihud Bnei Majd al-Krum
- 2017: Hapoel Umm al-Fahm
- 2019–2020: Hapoel Kafr Kanna
- 2020–2021: Hapoel Bu'eine
- 2021–2022: Ahva Kafr Manda
- 2023–: Hapoel Bnei Zalafa
- * Club domestic league appearances and goals

Ahmad Saba'a (or Ahmed Saba, Arabic: أحمد سبع, Hebrew: אחמד סבע; born 24 May 1980) is an Israeli former footballer.

== Biography ==
Ahmad Saba'a was born in Majd al-Kurum, Israel, to a Muslim-Arab family. His cousin Dia Saba'a is a footballer as well. In 2010, Saba'a founded his own football school, operating in his hometown of Majd al-Kurum. The school has 180 protégés and its main goal is to bring local talent from Majd al-Kurum to the second and first division leagues in Israel. He is a cousin of Israeli professional footballer Dia Saba.

== Club career ==
=== Hapoel Majd al-Kurum ===
Ahmad grew up in the youth ranks of Hapoel Majd al-Krum and made his debut for the senior side in 1997. In 1999-00 he was one of the main players in the club's historic promotion to Liga Artzit. He left Majd al-Krum in 2002.

=== Hapoel Acre ===
Ahmad moved to Hapoel Acre after signing a one-year contract in July 2002. Even though he played well for the club with 10 goals in 20 league games, he didn't extended his contract with the club.

=== Hapoel Bnei Lod ===
In August 2003 he moved to Hapoel Bnei Lod. He helped Lod win two promotions, the first came in the 2004–05 season when the club won Liga Alef, the next season the club won Liga Artzit with Ahmad as one of the factors for the team's success. In 6 seasons with the club Saba'a scored 61 goals in 149 league games.

=== Maccabi Netanya ===
On 20 January 2009, Saba'a signed a one-year deal with Maccabi Netanya. His first goal for the club came against Sliema Wanderers in the UEFA Europa League on 23 July 2009. In his first season with Netanya he became the club's top scorer, a feat repeated the following three seasons. In June 2011 he extended his contract with the club for 3 more years under a new contract worth $390,000. In September 2011 he was appointed as the captain of the team. He was voted as player of the 2011–12 season while securing his position as the top goalscorer with 20 league goals. On 4 November 2012 he became the first to score a goal in the opening game of the new Netanya Stadium as Netanya won the game 2–1 against Hapoel Tel Aviv.

In 4 seasons with the club Saba'a scored 62 goals in a total of 153 games in all club competitions. Saba'a is in the top ten all time goalscorers of Maccabi Netanya.

=== Hapoel Ironi Kiryat Shmona ===
On 16 May 2013, after 4 years with Netanya he moved to Hapoel Ironi Kiryat Shmona for a transfer fee of $120,000. Saba'a signed a two years contract with Kiryat Shmona.

=== Hapoel Ra'anana ===
After a terrible half season with Kiryat Shmona, in January 2014 Saba'a moved to Hapoel Ra'anana. One month later he asked to be released from the club.

== International career ==
After reaching the highest levels of Israeli domestic football, Saba'a has said that his goal is to one day play for the Israel national team. He has never featured for any national youth football teams. On 18 March 2012 after a lot of media coverage on the fact that he has yet been called for the national team, Saba'a was quoted that he will not play for the Palestine national side - "I won't play for Palestine because I'm an Israeli player".

== Statistics ==
Club performance			League		Cup		League Cup		Continental		Total	
Season	Club	League	Apps	Goals	Apps	Goals	Apps	Goals	Apps	Goals	Apps	Goals
Israel			League		State Cup		League Cup		Continental		Total	
2006–07	Hapoel Bnei Lod	Liga Leumit	29	11	2	2	2	0	0	0	33	13
2007–08	Hapoel Bnei Lod	Liga Leumit	30	6	0	0	10	2	0	0	40	8
2008–09	Hapoel Bnei Lod	Liga Leumit	31	13	1	0	11	5	0	0	43	18
2009–10	Maccabi Netanya	Ligat ha'Al	26	9	1	0	2	1	3	1	32	11
2010–11	Maccabi Netanya	Ligat ha'Al	35	12	4	4	5	2	0	0	44	18
2011–12	Maccabi Netanya	Ligat ha'Al	33	20	3	2	3	0	0	0	39	22
2012–13	Maccabi Netanya	Ligat ha'Al	30	10	1	0	5	0	2	1	38	11
2013–14	Hapoel Ironi Kiryat Shmona	Ligat ha'Al	6	0	0	0	0	0	0	0	6	0
2013–14	Hapoel Ra'anana	Ligat ha'Al	3	0	2	0	0	0	0	0	5	0
2014–15	Hapoel Bnei Lod	Liga Leumit	7	0	0	0	4	0	0	0	11	0
2014–15	Hapoel Majd al-Kurum	Liga Alef	6	1	0	0	0	0	0	0	6	1
2015	Hilal Al-Quds	West Bank Premier League	0	0	0	0	0	0	1	0	1	0
2015–16	Hapoel Kafr Kanna	Liga Alef	27	6	3	0	0	0	0	0	30	6

== Honours ==
=== Team ===
- Liga Alef (2):
  - 1999-00 (Northern division), 2004-05 (Southern division)
- Liga Bet (1):
  - 2003-04
- Liga Artzit (1):
  - 2005-06

=== Individual ===
- Sport 5 Player of the Season (1): 2011–12
- Footballer of the Year in Israel (1): 2012
- Israeli Premier League - 2011–12 Top Goalscorer (20 goals)

== See also ==
- Sports in Israel
