= Murad Abu Anza =

Israeli footballer

Personal information
- Full name: Murad Abu Anza
- Date of birth: November 8, 1986 (age 39)
- Place of birth: Rahat, Israel
- Position: Striker

Team information
- Current team: Maccabi Ramla

Youth career
- Maccabi Kiryat Gat

Senior career*
Years	Team	Apps	(Gls)
2005–2006	Maccabi Kiryat Gat	0	(0)
2006–2014	Hapoel Bnei Lod	206	(72)
2011	→ Maccabi Petah Tikva (loan)	11	(4)
2012–2013	→ F.C. Ashdod (loan)	32	(6)
2014–2015	F.C. Ashdod	25	(3)
2015–2016	Hapoel Bnei Lod	23	(3)
2016–2017	Hapoel Acre	29	(5)
2017–2018	Maccabi Ahi Nazareth	18	(2)
2018	Hapoel Umm al-Fahm	9	(4)
2018–2020	Hapoel Bnei Lod	56	(14)
2020–2021	Hapoel Umm al-Fahm	5	(0)
2021	Maccabi Tamra	14	(0)
2021	Nordia Jerusalem	6	(0)
2021–2023	Ironi Kuseife	53	(0)
2023–2024	Tzeirei Tayibe	26	(6)
2024–	Maccabi Ramla	11	(4)
- * Club domestic league appearances and goals as of 31 December 2024

Murad Abu Anza (Arabic: مراد أبو عنزة, Hebrew: מוראד אבו ענזה; born November 8, 1986) is an Israeli footballer who currently plays for Maccabi Ramla. He also had loan spells in F.C. Ashdod and Maccabi Petah Tikva.

== 2013 Instagram Incident ==
In December 2013, after a match between Hapoel Bnei Lod and Maccabi Netanya, Abu Anza uploaded a selfie to his Instagram account showing bruises he claimed to have gotten during the match, and added in the photo description, referring to the match referee, Halim Zatme: "Halim Zatme son of a b**** and has no respect". In an unprecedented move, the IFA suspended Abu Anza for 4 matches over the comment.

== Honours ==
- Liga Leumit
  - Runner-up (1): 2011–12
- Liga Leumit top scorer
  - Winner (1): 2011–12
  - Runner-up (1): 2010–11

== Statistics ==
Club performance			League		Cup		League Cup		Continental		Total	
Season	Club	League	Apps	Goals	Apps	Goals	Apps	Goals	Apps	Goals	Apps	Goals
2006–07	Hapoel Bnei Lod	Liga Leumit	33	3	2	1	5	2	0	0	40	6
2007–08	Hapoel Bnei Lod	Liga Leumit	31	7	1	0	6	0	0	0	38	7
2008–09	Hapoel Bnei Lod	Liga Leumit	31	5	1	0	11	0	0	0	43	5
2009–10	Hapoel Bnei Lod	Liga Leumit	24	7	2	2	2	3	0	0	28	12
2010–11	Hapoel Bnei Lod	Liga Leumit	20	16	2	2	2	3	0	0	28	21
2010–11	Maccabi Petah Tikva	Israeli Premier League	11	4	0	0	-	-	0	0	11	4
2011–12	Hapoel Bnei Lod	Liga Leumit	34	19	3	2	2	1	0	0	39	22
2012–13	F.C. Ashdod	Israeli Premier League	32	6	1	0	1	0	0	0	34	6
2013–14	Hapoel Bnei Lod	Liga Leumit	33	15	1	1	-	-	0	0	34	16
2014–15	F.C. Ashdod	Israeli Premier League	0	0	0	0	-	-	0	0	0	0
Career total			249	82	13	8	29	9	0	0	291	99
