= 2008–09 Toto Cup Leumit =

Toto Cup Leumit
- Season: 2008–09
- Champions: Hapoel Be'er Sheva (1st title)

The 2008–09 Toto Cup Leumit was the twenty-seventh season of the third most important football tournament in Israel since its introduction and fifth under the current format. It was held in two stages. First, twelve Liga Leumit teams were divided into two groups. Four teams from each group advanced to the Quarterfinals. Quarterfinals held as two-legged matches, while the Semifinals and the Final was held as one-legged matches.

The defending champions were Hapoel Petah Tikva.

On 3 February 2009, Hapoel Be'er Sheva won the 2008–09 Toto Cup Leumit making it their first Toto Cup title.

== Group stage ==
The matches were played from August 8 to November 18, 2008.

=== Group A ===
Pos	Team	Pld	W	D	L	GF	GA	GD	Pts	HHA	HRG	HBL	IRH	MAN	MKA
1	Hapoel Haifa (A)	10	7	3	0	18	4	+14	24		0–0	0–0	1–0	1–0	4–0
2	Hapoel Ramat Gan (A)	10	5	3	2	15	6	+9	18	0–0		3–1	3–0	2–3	2–1
3	Hapoel Bnei Lod (A)	10	4	2	4	12	13	−1	14	1–3	1–0		1–1	1–2	3–1
4	Ironi Nir Ramat HaSharon (A)	10	2	3	5	10	14	−4	9	2–3	0–3	0–1		1–1	2–0
5	Maccabi Ahi Nazareth	10	2	3	5	11	19	−8	9	1–4	0–2	0–2	1–1		1–1
6	Maccabi Ironi Kiryat Ata	10	2	2	6	10	20	−10	8	0–2	0–0	3–1	0–3	4–2	

Source: football.org.il (in Hebrew)
Rules for classification: 1) points; 2) goal difference; 3) number of goals scored.
(A) Advanced to the quarterfinals

=== Group B ===
Pos	Team	Pld	W	D	L	GF	GA	GD	Pts	HAC	HBS	MHE	HJE	HRA	HKS
1	Hapoel Acre (A)	10	6	2	2	20	8	+12	20		1–1	2–1	1–1	4–1	4–0
2	Hapoel Be'er Sheva (A)	10	5	3	2	12	9	+3	18	0–3		1–2	1–1	2–0	2–1
3	Maccabi Herzliya (A)	10	3	3	4	10	12	−2	12	1–3	1–2		2–2	2–1	1–0
4	Hapoel Jerusalem (A)	10	3	3	4	11	15	−4	12	0–1	0–2	1–0		5–0	0–2
5	Hapoel Ra'anana	10	2	4	4	12	16	−4	10	1–0	0–0	0–0	6–0		3–3
6	Hapoel Kfar Saba	10	2	3	5	8	13	−5	9	2–1	0–1	0–0	0–1	0–0	

Source: football.org.il (in Hebrew)
Rules for classification: 1) points; 2) goal difference; 3) number of goals scored.
(A) Advanced to the quarterfinals

== Elimination rounds ==
=== Quarterfinals ===
The first legs were played from November 24 to December 11, 2008 while the second legs were played on January 5 to 13, 2009.

Team 1	Agg.	Team 2	1st leg	2nd leg
Maccabi Herzliya	3–2	Hapoel Haifa	1–0	2–2
Ironi Ramat HaSharon	3–2	Hapoel Acre	1–2	2–0
Hapoel Jerusalem	0–6	Hapoel Bnei Lod	0–4	0–2
Hapoel Ramat Gan	3–5	Hapoel Be'er Sheva	1–2	2–3 (aet)

=== Semifinals ===
January 20, 2009
17:00

Maccabi Herzliya	2 – 1	Ironi Ramat HaSharon

Winter Stadium, Ramat Gan

January 22, 2009
19:00

Hapoel Be'er Sheva	4 – 0	Hapoel Bnei Lod

Winter Stadium, Ramat Gan

=== Final ===
February 3, 2009
19:00

Hapoel Be'er Sheva	1 – 0 (aet)	Maccabi Herzliya

Winter Stadium, Ramat Gan

== See also ==
- 2008–09 Liga Leumit
- 2008–09 Israel State Cup
