= 2011–12 Liga Leumit =

Liga Leumit
- Season: 2011–12
- Champions: Hapoel Ramat Gan
- Promoted: Hapoel Ramat Gan
- Relegated: Ironi Bat Yam; Hapoel Herzliya; Maccabi Be'er Sheva
- Matches: 276
- Goals: 655 (2.37 per match)
- Top goalscorer: Murad Abu Anza (19)

The 2011–12 Liga Leumit was the thirteenth season since its introduction in 1999 and the 70th season of second-tier football in Israel. It began on 19 August 2011 and ended on 18 May 2012.

A total of sixteen teams were contesting in the league, including twelfth sides from the 2010–11 season, two promoted teams from the 2010–11 Liga Alef and two relegated teams from the 2010–11 Israeli Premier League.

== Changes from 2010–11 season ==
=== Structural changes ===
- Only one team will be promoted to the 2012–13 Israeli Premier League, and three relegated teams from the Israeli Premier League.
- Three team will be relegated to the 2012–13 Liga Alef, and only one will be promoted from Liga Alef.

=== Team changes ===
Location of teams in the 2011–12 Liga Leumit

Ironi Ramat HaSharon and Hapoel Rishon LeZion were directly promoted to the 2011–12 Israeli Premier League after finishing the 2010–11 season in the two top places.

Hapoel Ashkelon and Hapoel Ramat Gan were directly relegated to the 2011–12 Liga Leumit after finishing the 2010–11 Israeli Premier League season in the two bottom places.

== Overview ==
=== Stadia and locations ===
Club	Stadium	Capacity
Beitar Tel Aviv Ramla	Hatikva Neighborhood Stadium	6,500
Hakoah Amidar Ramat Gan	Winter Stadium	8,000
Hapoel Ashkelon	Sala Stadium	5,250
Hapoel Bnei Lod	Hatikva Neighborhood Stadium	6,500^{[A]}
Hapoel Herzliya	Herzliya Municipal Stadium	8,100
Hapoel Jerusalem	Teddy Stadium	21,600
Hapoel Kfar Saba	Levita Stadium	5,800
Hapoel Nazareth Illit	Green Stadium	4,000
Hapoel Ra'anana	Levita Stadium	5,800^{[A]}
Hapoel Ramat Gan	Winter Stadium	8,000^{[A]}
Ironi Bat Yam	Bat Yam Municipal Stadium	3,100
Maccabi Ahi Nazareth	Ilut Stadium	4,932
Maccabi Be'er Sheva	Vasermil Stadium	13,000
Maccabi Herzliya	Herzliya Municipal Stadium	8,100
Maccabi Umm al-Fahm	HaShalom Stadium	7,000
Sektzia Nes Tziona	Ness Ziona Stadium	3,500

The club is playing their home games at a neutral venue because their own ground does not meet Premier League requirements.

== Regular season ==
=== Regular season table ===
Pos	Team	Pld	W	D	L	GF	GA	GD	Pts	Promotion or relegation
1	Hapoel Ramat Gan	30	18	5	7	44	20	+24	59	Top Playoff
2	Hapoel Bnei Lod	30	17	8	5	43	26	+17	59	Top Playoff
3	Maccabi Herzliya	30	12	13	5	30	20	+10	49	Top Playoff
4	Maccabi Ahi Nazareth	30	14	7	9	41	36	+5	49	Top Playoff
5	Hapoel Ra'anana	30	13	9	8	34	22	+12	48	Top Playoff
6	Hapoel Jerusalem	30	12	8	10	39	33	+6	44	Top Playoff
7	Maccabi Umm al-Fahm	30	12	8	10	28	31	−3	44	Middle Playoff
8	Beitar Tel Aviv Ramla	30	11	9	10	40	35	+5	42	Middle Playoff
9	Hapoel Kfar Saba	30	11	8	11	36	30	+6	41	Middle Playoff
10	Hapoel Ashkelon	30	10	10	10	35	37	−2	40	Middle Playoff
11	Sektzia Nes Tziona	30	9	12	9	44	37	+7	39	Bottom Playoff
12	Ironi Bat Yam	30	8	8	14	30	38	−8	32	Bottom Playoff
13	Hakoah Amidar Ramat Gan	30	8	8	14	25	45	−20	32	Bottom Playoff
14	Hapoel Nazareth Illit	30	8	6	16	25	42	−17	29 (Note: Hapoel Nazareth Illit were deducted one point.)	Bottom Playoff
15	Maccabi Be'er Sheva	30	6	7	17	33	51	−18	25	Bottom Playoff
16	Hapoel Herzliya	30	5	6	19	20	44	−24	21	Bottom Playoff

Source: Israel Football Association
Rules for classification: 1st points; 2nd goal difference; 3rd matches won; 4th goals scored; 5th head-to-head; 6th decision match. Winners of 2011–12 Israel State Cup qualify for the third qualifying round of the UEFA Europa League.

=== Regular season results ===
Home \ Away	BTR	HAR	HAS	HBL	HHE	HJE	HKS	HNI	HRA	HRG	IBY	MAN	MBS	MHE	MUF	SNT
Beitar Tel Aviv Ramla		1–1	2–2	2–3	0–0	3–2	0–0	3–0 (Note: Hapoel Nazareth Illit received a technical loss of 3–0 to Beitar Tel Aviv Ramla for fielding an ineligible player. The original game finished in a 0–0 draw.)	1–0	3–0	1–0	0–3	4–2	1–0	1–2	0–0
Hakoah Amidar Ramat Gan	0–2		0–0	1–3	2–1	2–0	1–1	2–1	3–2	0–2	0–2	1–1	1–2	0–1	0–0	0–2
Hapoel Ashkelon	1–2	1–2		0–0	2–1	0–0	0–1	0–2	3–2	1–0	0–0	5–1	2–1	2–1	2–3	0–0
Hapoel Bnei Lod	0–0	2–0	1–0		4–1	0–0	1–0	2–0	0–2	1–1	3–2	0–0	2–1	0–0	0–0	0–1
Hapoel Herzliya	0–2	3–0	0–1	0–1		1–0	2–1	3–1	1–2	0–1	0–1	0–1	1–0	1–1	0–0	0–4
Hapoel Jerusalem	3–2	1–2	2–0	2–0	3–1		0–1	3–0	0–3	1–2	2–0	2–1	0–0	1–1	1–0	2–1
Hapoel Kfar Saba	2–1	3–0	0–0	1–2	3–0	0–1		3–1	0–1	0–0	0–2	1–1	0–0	4–3	3–1	2–2
Hapoel Nazareth Illit	1–3	0–0	1–2	1–3	4–1	1–0	0–4		0–1	0–1	0–0	1–0	3–2	0–0	2–0	0–0
Hapoel Ra'anana	0–0	3–0	1–1	1–1	0–0	2–2	3–0	2–1		0–0	2–0	0–1	1–2	0–0	1–0	0–0
Hapoel Ramat Gan	2–1	0–1	4–1	3–0	1–0	0–2	2–1	2–0	3–0		0–0	2–1	1–0	1–2	4–0	0–0
Ironi Bat Yam	3–1	2–2	0–0	1–3	1–0	3–1	1–3	1–2	0–0	0–1		1–3	1–1	1–2	0–1	0–2
Maccabi Ahi Nazareth	1–3	3–0	2–0	0–4	3–1	2–0	1–1	0–0	0–2	1–0	1–3		1–0	2–0	0–0	2–1
Maccabi Be'er Sheva	4–1	2–1	3–5	1–3	0–0	2–2	1–0	1–0	1–2	0–3	1–3	2–4		1–2	0–1	1–1
Maccabi Herzliya	0–0	0–0	2–0	2–1	2–0	0–0	1–0	0–0	1–0	1–0	0–0	2–2	2–0		1–1	2–0
Maccabi Umm al-Fahm	1–0	0–2	2–1	3–0	1–0	2–2	0–1	2–0	1–0	1–3	2–1	1–2	2–0	0–0		0–3
Sektzia Nes Tziona	1–1	4–1	2–2	1–2	2–2	1–4	2–0	1–3	0–1	2–5	4–1	3–1	2–2	2–1	1–1	

Source: Israel Football Association
Legend: Blue = home team win; Yellow = draw; Red = away team win.

== Playoffs ==
Key numbers for pairing determination (number marks position after 30 games):

Rounds
31st	32nd	33rd	34th	35th
1 – 6; 2 – 5; 3 – 4	1 – 2; 5 – 3; 6 – 4	2 – 6; 3 – 1; 4 – 5	1 – 4; 2 – 3; 6 – 5	3 – 6; 4 – 2; 5 – 1
7 – 10; 8 – 9	7 – 8; 10 – 9	8 – 10; 9 – 7		
11 – 16; 12 – 15; 13 – 14	11 – 12; 15 – 13; 16 – 14	12 – 16; 13 – 11; 14 – 15	11 – 14; 12 – 13; 16 – 15	13 – 16; 14 – 12; 15 – 11

=== Top Playoff ===
The points obtained during the regular season were halved (and rounded up) before the start of the playoff. Thus, Hapoel Ramat Gan started with 30 points, Hapoel Bnei Lod with 30, Maccabi Ahi Nazareth with 25, Maccabi Herzliya with 25, Hapoel Ra'anana with 24, and Hapoel Jerusalem started with 22.

==== Top Playoff table ====
Pos	Team	Pld	W	D	L	GF	GA	GD	Pts	Promotion or relegation
1	Hapoel Ramat Gan (O, P)	35	21	6	8	54	26	+28	37 (Note: Because all three teams finished with the same number of points, the two teams with the better goal difference will face each other in a one-leg match to decide the division winner which will be promoted to the 2012–13 Israeli Premier League.) (Note: Hapoel Bnei Lod and Hapoel Ramat Gan were both deducted three points after the teams had an on-field brawl between them after their match against each other ended 1–1.)	Qualification to Promotion Playoff
2	Hapoel Bnei Lod	35	20	9	6	56	35	+21	37	Qualification to Promotion Playoff
3	Maccabi Herzliya	35	16	13	6	42	24	+18	37	
4	Maccabi Ahi Nazareth	35	16	7	12	43	47	−4	31	
5	Hapoel Ra'anana	35	14	9	12	37	30	+7	27	
6	Hapoel Jerusalem	35	13	8	14	44	40	+4	25	

Source: Israel Football Association
Rules for classification: 1st points; 2nd goal difference; 3rd matches won; 4th goals scored; 5th head-to-head; 6th decision match
(O) Play-off winners; (P) Promoted

==== Top Playoff results ====
Home \ Away	HBL	HJE	HRA	HRG	MAN	MHE
Hapoel Bnei Lod		4–3	1–0			1–5
Hapoel Jerusalem			0–1		0–1	
Hapoel Ra'anana				2–3		0–3
Hapoel Ramat Gan	1–1	0–2			3–0	
Maccabi Ahi Nazareth	0–6		1–0			
Maccabi Herzliya		1–0		1–3	2–0	

Source: Israel Football Association
Legend: Blue = home team win; Yellow = draw; Red = away team win.

==== Promotion playoff ====
The 1st-placed team Hapoel Ramat Gan faced the 2nd-placed team Hapoel Bnei Lod. The winner Hapoel Ramat Gan earned a spot in the 2012–13 Israeli Premier League. The match took place on 18 May 2012.

18 May 2012
16:00 UTC+3

Hapoel Ramat Gan	2 – 0	Hapoel Bnei Lod
Omer Buchsenbaum 6'; Ofir Hemo 75'	Report

HaMoshava Stadium, Petah Tikva
Attendance: 9,500
Referee: Liran Liany

=== Middle Playoff ===
The points obtained during the regular season were halved (and rounded up) before the start of the playoff. Thus, Maccabi Umm al-Fahm started with 22 points, Beitar Tel Aviv Ramla with 21, Hapoel Kfar Saba with 21, and Hapoel Ashkelon started with 20.

==== Middle Playoff table ====
Pos	Team	Pld	W	D	L	GF	GA	GD	Pts
7	Hapoel Kfar Saba	33	12	10	11	42	34	+8	26
8	Beitar Tel Aviv Ramla	33	12	10	11	48	43	+5	25
9	Hapoel Ashkelon	33	11	12	10	42	43	−1	25
10	Maccabi Umm al-Fahm	33	12	9	12	30	36	−6	23

Source: Israel Football Association
Rules for classification: 1st points; 2nd goal difference; 3rd matches won; 4th goals scored; 5th head-to-head; 6th decision match

==== Middle Playoff results ====
Home \ Away	BTR	HAS	HKS	MUF
Beitar Tel Aviv Ramla		3–3	3–5	
Hapoel Ashkelon			1–1	
Hapoel Kfar Saba				0–0
Maccabi Umm al-Fahm	0–2	2–3		

Source: Israel Football Association
Legend: Blue = home team win; Yellow = draw; Red = away team win.

=== Bottom Playoff ===
The points obtained during the regular season were halved (and rounded up) before the start of the playoff. Thus, Sektzia Nes Tziona started with 20 points, Ironi Bat Yam with 16, Hakoah Ramat Gan with 16, Hapoel Nazareth Illit with 14, Maccabi Be'er Sheva with 13, and Hapoel Herzliya started with 11.

==== Bottom Playoff table ====
Pos	Team	Pld	W	D	L	GF	GA	GD	Pts	Relegation
11	Sektzia Nes Tziona	35	10	14	11	50	48	+2	25	
12	Hapoel Nazareth Illit	35	11	8	16	35	47	−12	25 (Note: Hapoel Nazareth Illit were deducted one point)	
13	Hakoah Amidar Ramat Gan	35	10	11	14	34	50	−16	25	
14	Ironi Bat Yam (R)	35	9	10	16	34	43	−9	21	Relegation to Liga Alef
15	Maccabi Be'er Sheva (R)	35	7	8	20	39	58	−19	17	Relegation to Liga Alef
16	Hapoel Herzliya (R)	35	6	8	21	25	51	−26	16	Relegation to Liga Alef

Source: Israel Football Association
Rules for classification: 1st points; 2nd goal difference; 3rd matches won; 4th goals scored; 5th head-to-head; 6th decision match
(R) Relegated

==== Bottom Playoff results ====
Home \ Away	HAR	HHE	HNI	IBY	MBS	SNT
Hakoah Amidar Ramat Gan		3–1	1–1			2–2
Hapoel Herzliya			1–1		2–1	
Hapoel Nazareth Illit				2–1	3–1	
Ironi Bat Yam	1–1	1–0			0–0	
Maccabi Be'er Sheva	0–2					4–0
Sektzia Nes Tziona		1–1	1–3	2–1		

Source: Israel Football Association
Legend: Blue = home team win; Yellow = draw; Red = away team win.

== Top scorers ==
Rank	Scorer	Club	Goals
1	(Israel) Murad Abu Anza	Hapoel Bnei Lod	19
2	(Ghana) Osei Mawuli	Hapoel Ashkelon	18
3	(Israel) Ran Ben Shimon	Ironi Bat Yam	14
4	(Israel) Adam Mizrahi	Hapoel Jerusalem	13
5	(Israel) Lior Asulin	Hapoel Ramat Gan	12
5	(Israel) Ran Itzhak^{1}	Hapoel Kfar Saba	12
5	(Ivory Coast) Serge Ayeli	Maccabi Ahi Nazareth	12
5	(Israel) Itzhak Abushdid	Beitar Tel Aviv Ramla	12
5	(Israel) Yossi Asayag	Hapoel Ra'anana	12
10	(Argentina) Adrián Fernández	Hapoel Ramat Gan	11
10	(Israel) Yadin Zaris	Maccabi Herzliya	11
Total			655
Average per game			2.37

Source: Israel Football Association
- ^1 Ran Itzhak was transferred from the Israeli Premier League club Ironi Ramat HaSharon during the winter transfer window.

== Season statistics ==
=== Scoring ===
- First goal of the season: (Ghana) Ibrahim Basit for Maccabi Umm al-Fahm against Hapoel Bnei Lod, 64th minute (19 August 2011)
- Widest winning margin: 6 goals – Maccabi Ahi Nazareth 0–6 Hapoel Bnei Lod (11 May 2012)
- Most goals in a match: 8 goals –
  - Maccabi Be'er Sheva 3–5 Hapoel Ashkelon (26 December 2011)
  - Beitar Tel Aviv Ramla 3–5 Hapoel Kfar Saba (14 April 2012)
- Most goals in a half: 6 goals – Hapoel Bnei Lod 1–5 Maccabi Herzliya, 0–0 at half-time (4 May 2012)
- Most goals in a match by one player: 3 goals –
  - (Ghana) Ibrahim Basit for Maccabi Umm al-Fahm against Hapoel Bnei Lod (19 August 2011)
  - (Israel) Adam Mizrahi for Hapoel Jerusalem against Sektzia Nes Tziona (3 October 2011)
  - (Israel) Murad Abu Anza for Hapoel Bnei Lod against Hapoel Nazareth Illit (15 October 2011)
  - (Israel) Mati Avraham for Hapoel Jerusalem against Beitar Tel Aviv Ramla (18 November 2011)
  - (Ghana) William Owusu for Hapoel Kfar Saba against Hapoel Nazareth Illit (21 November 2011)
  - (Israel) Murad Abu Anza for Hapoel Bnei Lod against Ironi Bat Yam (19 December 2011)
  - (Israel) Mor Shaked for Sektzia Nes Tziona against Hapoel Herzliya (9 March 2012)
  - (Israel) Ran Itzhak for Hapoel Kfar Saba against Hapoel Herzliya (30 March 2012)
  - (Israel) Yadin Zaris for Maccabi Herzliya against Hapoel Bnei Lod (4 May 2012)
  - (Israel) Yaniv Deri for Hapoel Nazareth Illit against Sektzia Nes Tziona (7 May 2012)

=== Discipline ===
- First yellow card of the season: (Israel) Salach Haj for Maccabi Umm al-Fahm against Hapoel Bnei Lod, 28th minute (19 August 2011)
- First red card of the season: (Israel) Yaniv Deri for Hapoel Nazareth Illit against Hapoel Ashkelon, 90th minute (27 August 2011)

== See also ==
- 2011–12 Israel State Cup
- 2011–12 Toto Cup Leumit
