= 2014–15 Toto Cup Leumit =

Tournament details
- Country: Israel
- Teams: 16

Final positions
- Champions: Hapoel Bnei Lod
- Runners-up: Bnei Yehuda

Tournament statistics
- Matches played: 31
- Goals scored: 63 (2.03 per match)
- Top goal scorer: Lanry Kahinda (Hapoel Afula) (5)

The 2014–15 Toto Cup Leumit was the 24th season of the second tier League Cup (as a separate competition) since its introduction. It was held in two stages. First, sixteen Liga Leumit teams were divided into four regionalized groups. The winners and runners-up advanced to the quarter-finals. Quarter-finals, semi-finals and the Final were held as one-legged matches. The final was played at the Ramat Gan Stadium on 9 December 2014, which saw Hapoel Bnei Lod defeat Bnei Yehuda with a score of 2–0.

The defending cup holders were Hapoel Rishon LeZion, having won the cup on its previous edition, but they were eliminated in the group stage.

== Group stage ==
The draw took place on 30 June 2014.

The matches are due to be played from 2 August to 16 August 2014. However the opening date was postponed because of the 2014 Israel–Gaza conflict. and the group stage matches were played between 12 August and 19 August 2014. The first round of group stage matches was played on 12 August 2014, and the second the following Friday, 15 August 2014.

=== Tiebreakers ===
If two or more teams are equal on points on completion of the group matches, the following criteria are applied to determine the rankings.

1. Superior goal difference
2. Higher number of victories achieved
3. Higher number of goals scored
4. Higher number of points obtained in the group matches played among the teams in question
5. Superior goal difference from the group matches played among the teams in question
6. Higher number of victories achieved in the group matches played among the teams in question
7. Higher number of goals scored in the group matches played among the teams in question
8. A deciding match, if needed to set which team qualifies to the quarter-finals.

=== Group A ===
Pos	Team	Pld	W	D	L	GF	GA	GD	Pts	ITI	HAF	MAN	HNI
1	Ironi Tibieras (A)	3	3	0	0	9	4	+5	9			2–1	3–1
2	Hapoel Afula (A)	3	2	0	1	6	5	+1	6	2–4			
3	Maccabi Ahi Nazareth	3	1	0	2	4	3	+1	3		0–1		3–0
4	Hapoel Nazareth Illit	3	0	0	3	2	9	−7	0		1–3		

Source: football.org.il (in Hebrew)
Rules for classification: 1st points; 2nd goal difference; 3rd matches won; 4th goals scored; 5th head-to-head; 6th decision match
(A) Advanced to the quarterfinals

=== Group B ===
Pos	Team	Pld	W	D	L	GF	GA	GD	Pts	HKS	BnY	HRH	MHE
1	Hapoel Kfar Saba (A)	3	3	0	0	6	1	+5	9				4–1
2	Bnei Yehuda (A)	3	0	2	1	3	4	−1	2	0–1		0–0	
3	Hapoel Ramat HaSharon	3	0	2	1	0	1	−1	2	0–1			
4	Maccabi Herzliya	3	0	2	1	4	7	−3	2		3–3	0–0	

Source: football.org.il (in Hebrew)
Rules for classification: 1st points; 2nd goal difference; 3rd matches won; 4th goals scored; 5th head-to-head; 6th decision match
(A) Advanced to the quarterfinals

=== Group C ===
Pos	Team	Pld	W	D	L	GF	GA	GD	Pts	HBL	BTR	HRG	HAR
1	Hapoel Bnei Lod (A)	3	3	0	0	4	0	+4	9			1–0	2–0
2	Beitar Tel Aviv Ramla (A)	3	1	1	1	4	2	+2	4	0–1			
3	Hapoel Ramat Gan	3	1	0	2	1	4	−3	3		0–3		
4	Hakoah Amidar Ramat Gan	3	0	1	2	1	4	−3	1		1–1	0–1	

Source: football.org.il (in Hebrew)
Rules for classification: 1st points; 2nd goal difference; 3rd matches won; 4th goals scored; 5th head-to-head; 6th decision match
(A) Advanced to the quarterfinals

=== Group D ===
Pos	Team	Pld	W	D	L	GF	GA	GD	Pts	MYA	MKG	HRL	HJE
1	Maccabi Yavne (A)	3	1	2	0	3	0	+3	5		0–0		
2	Maccabi Kiryat Gat (A)	3	1	2	0	2	0	+2	5			2–0	0–0
3	Hapoel Rishon LeZion	3	1	1	1	5	4	+1	4	0–0			5–2
4	Hapoel Jerusalem	3	0	1	2	2	8	−6	1	0–3			

Source: football.org.il (in Hebrew)
Rules for classification: 1st points; 2nd goal difference; 3rd matches won; 4th goals scored; 5th head-to-head; 6th decision match
(A) Advanced to the quarterfinals

== Knockout rounds ==
=== Quarterfinals ===
1 September 2014	Ironi Tiberias	1–0	Hapoel Kfar Saba	Afula
19:00	Dahan 12'	report		Stadium: Afula Illit Stadium; Referee: Snir Zecharia

1 September 2014	Maccabi Yavne	0–1	Bnei Yehuda	Ness Ziona
19:00		report	Hadad 55'	Stadium: Ness Ziona Stadium; Referee: Idan Almalem

2 September 2014	Maccabi Kiryat Gat	0–0 (a.e.t.) (5–4 p)	Hapoel Afula	Ashkelon
19:00		report		Stadium: Sala Stadium; Referee: Oren Simanian

2 September 2014	Hapoel Bnei Lod	1–0	Beitar Tel Aviv Ramla	Lod
19:00	Lukman 77'	report		Stadium: Lod Municipal Stadium; Referee: Eliran Ben Simon

=== Semifinals ===
4 November 2014	Ironi Tiberias	1–1 (a.e.t.) (2–4 p)	Hapoel Bnei Lod	Netanya
17:00	Biton 27' (o.g.)	Report	Ben Lulu 15'	Stadium: Netanya Stadium; Referee: Shimon Elkabetz
	Penalties
	Avika (penalty scored); Siso (penalty scored); Kirkitadze (penalty missed); Braver (penalty missed)		(penalty scored) Lukman; (penalty scored) Shushan; (penalty scored) Azulay; (penalty scored) Sha'aban

4 November 2014	Maccabi Kiryat Gat	0–0 (a.e.t.) (3–5 p)	Bnei Yehuda	Netanya
20:00		Report		Stadium: Netanya Stadium; Referee: Shalom Ben Avraham
	Penalties
	Zohar (penalty scored); Ayala (penalty missed); Ben Shimon (penalty scored); Porat (penalty scored)		(penalty scored) Galvan; (penalty scored) Kadusi; (penalty scored) Agayov; (penalty scored) Finish; (penalty scored) Baldout

== Final ==
9 December 2014	Bnei Yehuda	0–2	Hapoel Bnei Lod	Petah Tikva
19:00 IST			Shavit 1'; Ben Lulu 11'	Stadium: HaMoshava Stadium

== See also ==
- 2014–15 Toto Cup Al
- 2014–15 Liga Leumit
- 2014–15 Israel State Cup
