= Raz Shavit =

Israeli footballer

Raz Shavit רז שביט
Personal information
- Full name: Raz Shavit
- Date of birth: November 7, 1992 (age 33)
- Place of birth: Ramla, Israel
- Position: Striker

Team information
- Current team: Ironi Ashkelon

Youth career
- Hapoel Bnei Lod

Senior career*
Years	Team	Apps	(Gls)
2011–2020	Hapoel Bnei Lod	245	(16)
2020–2021	Shimshon Kafr Qasim	16	(3)
2021–2022	Maccabi Ramla	22	(9)
2022–2024	Hapoel Shimshon Ashkelon	35	(10)
2025–	Ironi Ashkelon	0	(0)
- * Club domestic league appearances and goals as of 1 June 2025

Raz Shavit (Hebrew: רז שביט) is an Israeli footballer who currently plays at Hapoel Ashkelon.
