= 2008–09 Liga Leumit =

Liga Leumit
- Season: 2008–09
- Champions: Hapoel Haifa
- Promoted: Hapoel Haifa; Hapoel Acre; Hapoel Be'er Sheva; Hapoel Ramat Gan; Amutat Hapoel Ra'anana; Maccabi Ahi Nazareth
- Relegated: Maccabi Ironi Kiryat Ata
- Matches played: 198
- Goals scored: 457 (2.31 per match)

The 2008–09 Liga Leumit season began on 29 August 2008 and ended on 29 May 2009.

Two teams from Liga Artzit were promoted at the end of the previous season: Hapoel Jerusalem and Maccabi Ironi Kiryat Ata along with two teams relegated from Israeli Premier League: Maccabi Herzliya and Hapoel Kfar Saba.
The two teams relegated to Liga Artzit were Hapoel Nazareth Illit and Hapoel Rishon LeZion.

Due to an expected league expansion, at the end of the season five clubs were automatically promoted to the Israeli Premier League, whilst the sixth-placed club in Liga Leumit played in a play-off match against the 11th-placed team in the Premier League. Only one team relegated automatically, and one team played in a play-off match against a team from Liga Artzit (which ceased to exist, with the regionalised Liga Alef becoming the third tier).

== Stadia ==
Location of teams in the 2008–09 Liga Leumit

Club	Stadium	Capacity
Hapoel Jerusalem	Teddy Stadium	21,600
Hapoel Haifa	Kiryat Eliezer Stadium	14,002
Hapoel Be'er Sheva	Vasermil Stadium	13,000
Maccabi Herzliya	Herzliya Municipal Stadium	8,100
Hapoel Ramat Gan	HaMakhtesh Stadium	5,500
Hapoel Kfar Saba	Levita Stadium	5,800
Hapoel Acre	Napoleon Stadium	5,000^{1}
Maccabi Ahi Nazareth	Ilut Stadium	4,932
Hapoel Ra'anana	Karnei Oren Memorial Field	2,500
Hapoel Bnei Lod	Lod Municipal Stadium	2,000
Ironi Ramat HaSharon	Yankela Grundman Stadium	2,200
Maccabi Kiryat Ata	Kiryat Ata Municipal Stadium	726

^{1}Currently undergoing construction work to convert it to a 5,000-seat stadium. In the meanwhile they play at the Nahariya Municipal Stadium.

== League table ==
Pos	Team	Pld	W	D	L	GF	GA	GD	Pts	Promotion or relegation
1	Hapoel Haifa (C, P)	33	17	11	5	44	29	+15	62 (Note: Hapoel Haifa received a technical loss of 3-0 to Hapoel Bnei Lod for fielding an ineligible player.)	Promotion to Israeli Premier League
2	Hapoel Acre (P)	33	17	10	6	50	23	+27	61	Promotion to Israeli Premier League
3	Hapoel Be'er Sheva (P)	33	16	11	6	53	35	+18	59	Promotion to Israeli Premier League
4	Hapoel Ramat Gan (P)	33	14	11	8	37	31	+6	53	Promotion to Israeli Premier League
5	Hapoel Ra'anana (P)	33	15	6	12	36	38	−2	51	Promotion to Israeli Premier League
6	Maccabi Ahi Nazareth (O, P)	33	12	9	12	41	33	+8	45	Qualification for promotion play-offs
7	Maccabi Herzliya	33	10	8	15	34	46	−12	38	
8	Hapoel Kfar Saba	33	8	12	13	34	41	−7	36	
9	Hapoel Bnei Lod	33	8	13	12	35	38	−3	37	
10	Hapoel Jerusalem	33	9	10	14	32	40	−8	37	
11	Ironi Nir Ramat HaSharon (O)	33	8	12	13	37	50	−13	36	Qualification for relegation play-offs
12	Maccabi Ironi Kiryat Ata (R)	33	4	7	22	24	53	−29	19	Relegation to Liga Alef

Source: The Israel Football Association
Rules for classification: 1st points; 2nd goal difference; 3rd matches won; 4th goals scored; 5th head-to-head; 6th decision match
(C) Champions; (O) Play-off winners; (P) Promoted; (R) Relegated

=== Positions by round ===
Team ╲ Round	1	2	3	4	5	6	7	8	9	10	11	12	13	14	15	16	17	18	19	20	21	22	23	24	25	26	27	28	29	30	31	32	33
Hapoel Haifa	1	1	1	1	1	1	1	1	1	1	1	1	1	1	1	1	1	1	1	1	1	1	1	1	1	1	1	1	1	1	1	1	1
Hapoel Acre	12	12	9	6	3	3	4	5	6	6	6	6	4	5	4	4	5	4	2	2	2	3	2	3	3	2	2	2	2	3	3	3	2
Hapoel Be'er Sheva	6	9	5	4	5	4	3	3	5	4	3	3	3	3	2	3	4	5	5	5	4	2	3	2	2	3	3	3	3	2	2	2	3
Hapoel Ramat Gan	4	3	2	2	2	2	2	2	2	2	2	2	2	2	3	2	2	2	3	4	3	4	4	4	4	4	4	4	4	4	4	4	4
Hapoel Ra'anana	5	7	6	8	9	7	5	4	3	5	5	4	5	4	5	5	3	3	4	3	5	5	5	5	5	5	5	5	5	5	5	5	5
Maccabi Ahi Nazareth	2	2	3	3	4	5	6	6	4	3	4	5	6	6	6	6	6	6	6	6	6	6	6	6	6	6	6	6	6	6	6	6	6
Maccabi Herzliya	9	6	4	5	6	6	8	8	8	10	11	11	11	11	10	10	11	11	11	11	11	11	11	10	11	10	10	9	9	10	10	8	7
Hapoel Bnei Lod	11	11	12	12	12	12	12	12	12	12	10	10	10	10	11	11	10	10	8	8	8	10	10	11	10	11	11	10	10	9	8	9	8
Hapoel Jerusalem	8	4	7	9	7	9	9	9	9	9	8	8	8	9	9	9	9	9	7	7	7	8	8	7	7	7	7	7	7	7	9	10	9
Hapoel Kfar Saba	3	5	8	7	8	8	7	7	7	7	7	7	7	8	8	8	8	8	9	9	9	7	7	8	8	8	8	8	8	8	7	7	10
Ironi Nir Ramat HaSharon	7	8	11	10	10	10	10	10	10	8	9	9	9	7	7	7	7	7	10	10	10	9	9	9	9	9	9	11	11	11	11	11	11
Maccabi Kiryat Ata	10	10	10	11	11	11	11	11	11	11	12	12	12	12	12	12	12	12	12	12	12	12	12	12	12	12	12	12	12	12	12	12	12

Source: The Israel Football Association

== Results ==
The schedule consisted of three rounds. During first two rounds, each team played each other once home and away for a total of 22 matches. The pairings of the third round were then set according to the standings after first two rounds, giving every team a third game against each opponent for a total of 33 games per team.

=== First and second round ===
Home \ Away	HAC	HBS	HBL	HHA	HJE	HKS	HRA	HRG	IRH	MAN	MHE	IKA
Hapoel Acre		0–2	3–0	0–4	3–0	2–1	1–0	2–0	3–0	2–1	0–1	0–0
Hapoel Be'er Sheva	2–1		2–2	1–1	0–2	1–0	3–1	0–1	2–3	0–2	2–1	3–0
Hapoel Bnei Lod	0–0	0–2		1–2	0–2	1–2	0–1	0–3	4–0	1–1	1–0	0–0
Hapoel Haifa	2–2	1–1	1–2		2–0	0–0	2–0	0–0	0–1	1–0	1–1	2–0
Hapoel Jerusalem	0–0	1–1	0–0	0–1		1–1	0–2	2–3	4–1	1–0	1–2	0–0
Hapoel Kfar Saba	1–0	0–1	0–2	1–1	1–0		1–1	0–0	3–2	1–3	1–3	2–0
Hapoel Ra'anana	0–1	0–4	1–1	0–2	1–0	3–2		0–0	1–0	0–0	1–0	1–0
Hapoel Ramat Gan	1–1	1–1	3–3	1–1	0–1	1–0	3–1		2–1	0–0	1–0	3–1
Ironi Nir Ramat HaSharon	0–2	0–0	1–0	0–2	1–1	1–1	1–2	1–0		2–2	3–0	2–0
Maccabi Ahi Nazareth	2–1	0–1	3–0	0–0	2–2	1–1	1–2	3–0	1–1		4–1	2–0
Maccabi Herzliya	0–1	1–1	0–4	1–2	2–1	1–1	1–3	0–2	1–0	1–0		1–2
Maccabi Kiryat Ata	0–2	0–1	1–1	0–1	0–1	0–2	1–2	0–1	1–1	1–0	0–0	

Source: The Israel Football Association
Legend: Blue = home team win; Yellow = draw; Red = away team win.

=== Third round ===
Key numbers for pairing determination (number marks position after 22 games):

Rounds
23rd	24th	25th	26th	27th	28th	29th	30th	31st	32nd	33rd
3 – 12; 4 – 2; 5 – 1; 6 – 11; 7 – 10; 8 – 9	12 – 9; 10 – 8; 11 – 7; 1 – 6; 2 – 5; 3 – 4	4 – 12; 5 – 3; 6 – 2; 7 – 1; 8 – 11; 9 – 10	12 – 10; 11 – 9; 1 – 8; 2 – 7; 3 – 6; 4 – 5	5 – 12; 6 – 4; 7 – 3; 8 – 2; 9 – 1; 10 – 11	12 – 11; 1 – 10; 2 – 9; 3 – 8; 4 – 7; 5 – 6	6 – 12; 7 – 5; 8 – 4; 9 – 3; 10 – 2; 11 – 1	1 – 12; 2 – 11; 3 – 10; 4 – 9; 5 – 8; 6 – 7	12 – 7; 8 – 6; 9 – 5; 10 – 4; 11 – 3; 1 – 2	2 – 12; 3 – 1; 4 – 11; 5 – 10; 6 – 9; 7 – 8	12 – 8; 9 – 7; 10 – 6; 11 – 5; 1 – 4; 2 – 3

Home \ Away	HAC	HBS	HBL	HHA	HJE	HKS	HRA	HRG	IRH	MAN	MHE	IKA
Hapoel Acre			0–0	7–1	1–1			0–0		1–0		5–0
Hapoel Be'er Sheva	0–2					2–2	3–1		3–3		3–2	3–2
Hapoel Bnei Lod		1–1			0–1			2–1		4–2	0–0	
Hapoel Haifa		2–1	0–3 (Note: Hapoel Haifa received a technical loss of 3–0 to Hapoel Bnei Lod for fielding an ineligible player.)		3–0			0–0		3–1		3–1
Hapoel Jerusalem		1–2						0–1	1–1	0–2	3–1	
Hapoel Kfar Saba	0–1		1–1	3–0	2–2		1–1					
Hapoel Ra'anana	1–3		1–0	1–0	2–0					1–2		2–1
Hapoel Ramat Gan		1–1				3–1	0–2		3–1		0–4	2–1
Ironi Nir Ramat HaSharon	3–3		1–1	1–2		2–0	1–1					
Maccabi Ahi Nazareth		0–3				1–0		1–0	0–1		3–0	1–1
Maccabi Herzliya	0–0			0–0		2–0	2–1		1–1			
Maccabi Kiryat Ata			2–0		2–3	1–2			3–0		3–4	

Source: The Israel Football Association
Legend: Blue = home team win; Yellow = draw; Red = away team win.

== Promotion/relegation playoff ==
=== Promotion playoff ===
Maccabi Ahi Nazareth as the 6th-placed team faced the 11th-placed Israeli Premier League team Hakoah Ramat Gan for a two-legged playoff. Maccabi Ahi Nazareth won both games and were promoted to the Israeli Premier League.

2 June 2009
20:30 UTC+2

Maccabi Ahi Nazareth	2 – 1	Hakoah Ramat Gan
Ayeli 41'; Silvas 48'	Report	For 42'

Ilut Stadium, Ilut
Referee: Alon Yefet

6 June 2009
19:00 UTC+2

Hakoah Ramat Gan	1 – 2	Maccabi Ahi Nazareth
For 23'	Report	Jida 46'; Ayeli 76'

Winter Stadium, Ramat Gan
Referee: Eitan Tabrizi

=== Relegation playoff ===
Ironi Ramat HaSharon as the 11th-placed team faced the 8th-placed Liga Artzit team Maccabi Kafr Kanna for a two-legged playoff, Ironi Ramat HaSharon won both games and will continue playing in Liga Leumit next season.

2 June 2009
16:30 UTC+2

Ironi Ramat HaSharon	2 – 1	Maccabi Kafr Kanna
Banahene 73', 85'; Shabo (penalty missed)	Report	Zilka 45'

Grundman Stadium, Ramat HaSharon
Referee: Meir Levi

5 June 2009
15:30 UTC+2

Maccabi Kafr Kanna	0 – 1	Ironi Ramat HaSharon
	Report	Banahene 19'

Azmi Nassar Stadium, Kafr Kanna
Referee: Assaf Keinan

== Season statistics ==
=== Scoring ===
- First goal of the season: Eran Levy for Hapoel Haifa against Hapoel Acre, 26th minute (29 August 2008)
- Widest winning margin: 6 goals – Hapoel Acre 7–1 Hapoel Haifa (22 May 2009)
- Most goals in a match: 8 goals – Hapoel Acre 7–1 Hapoel Haifa (22 May 2009)

=== Discipline ===
- First yellow card of the season: Muhamad Brik for Hapoel Acre against Hapoel Haifa, 3rd minute (29 August 2008)
- First red card of the season: Bryan Gerzicich for Hapoel Acre against Hapoel Haifa, 36th minute (29 August 2008)
- Most red cards in a single match: 3 – Hapoel Acre 2–1 Maccabi Ahi Nazareth - 3 for Maccabi Ahi Nazareth (Amjad Suliman, Yakir Shina & Serge Ayeli) (6 December 2008)

== Top scorers ==
Rank	Player	Club	Goals
1	(Israel) Ohad Kadousi	Hapoel Be'er Sheva	18
2	(Israel) Eran Levy	Hapoel Haifa	13
2	(Israel) Achmad Saba'a	Hapoel Bnei Lod	13
2	(Ivory Coast) Serge Ayeli	Maccabi Ahi Nazareth	13
5	(Israel) Shay Aharon	Hapoel Jerusalem	12
6	(Georgia (country)) Irakliy Geperidze	Hapoel Haifa	11
7	(Israel) Dovev Gabay	Maccabi Herzliya	10
7	(Ghana) Emmanuel Banahene	Ironi Nir Ramat HaSharon	10
9	(Israel) Ronen Shwartzman	Hapoel Acre	8
9	(Israel) Dudu Biton	Hapoel Ra'anana	8
9	(Israel) Mor Golan	Hapoel Ramat Gan	8
9	(Democratic Republic of the Congo) Alain Masudi	Maccabi Herzliya	8
Total			457
Average per game			2.3

== See also ==
- 2008–09 Toto Cup Leumit
