= 2011–12 Toto Cup Leumit =

Toto Cup Leumit
- Season: 2011–12
- Champions: Hapoel Ramat Gan

The 2011–12 Toto Cup Leumit was the thirtieth season of the third most important football tournament in Israel since its introduction and the eighth under the current format. It was held in two stages. First, sixteen Liga Leumit teams were divided into four groups. The winners and runners-up were advanced to the Quarterfinals. Quarterfinals, Semifinals and Finals were held as one-legged matches, with the Final played at the Haberfeld Stadium in Rishon LeZion.

It began on 6 August 2011 and ended on 13 December 2011. Ironi Ramat HaSharon, making it their first Toto Cup title overall, due to the promotion in the previous season the club could not defend their title.

It was won on 13 December 2011 by Hapoel Ramat Gan.

== Group stage ==
The draw took place on June 6, 2011.

The matches were played from 6 August to 25 October 2011.

=== Group A ===
| Pos | Team | Pld | W | D | L | GF | GA | GD | Pts | MUF | MAN | HKS | HNI |
|---|---|---|---|---|---|---|---|---|---|---|---|---|---|
| 1 | Maccabi Umm al-Fahm (A) | 6 | 3 | 1 | 2 | 10 | 7 | +3 | 10 | | 3–0 | 3–1 | 3–1 |
| 2 | Maccabi Ahi Nazareth (A) | 6 | 3 | 1 | 2 | 7 | 6 | +1 | 10 | 3–0 | | 0–1 | 2–1 |
| 3 | Hapoel Kfar Saba | 6 | 3 | 1 | 2 | 6 | 5 | +1 | 10 | 1–0 | 0–1 | | 2–0 |
| 4 | Hapoel Nazareth Illit | 6 | 0 | 3 | 3 | 5 | 10 | −5 | 3 | 1–1 | 1–1 | 1–1 | |

Source: football.org.il (in Hebrew)
Rules for classification: 1st points; 2nd goal difference; 3rd matches won; 4th goals scored; 5th head-to-head; 6th decision match
(A) Advanced to the quarterfinals

=== Group B ===
| Pos | Team | Pld | W | D | L | GF | GA | GD | Pts | HHE | MHE | HRA | HBL |
|---|---|---|---|---|---|---|---|---|---|---|---|---|---|
| 1 | Hapoel Herzliya (A) | 6 | 4 | 2 | 0 | 8 | 2 | +6 | 14 | | 1–1 | 1–0 | 2–1 |
| 2 | Maccabi Herzliya (A) | 6 | 1 | 5 | 0 | 6 | 4 | +2 | 8 | 0–0 | | 1–1 | 1–1 |
| 3 | Hapoel Ra'anana | 6 | 1 | 3 | 2 | 4 | 7 | −3 | 6 | 0–3 (Note: Hapoel Ra'anana received a technical loss of 3–0 to Maccabi Herzliya.) | 0–0 | | 1–0 |
| 4 | Hapoel Bnei Lod | 6 | 0 | 2 | 4 | 5 | 10 | −5 | 2 | 0–1 | 1–3 | 2–2 | |

Source: football.org.il (in Hebrew)
Rules for classification: 1st points; 2nd goal difference; 3rd matches won; 4th goals scored; 5th head-to-head; 6th decision match
(A) Advanced to the quarterfinals

=== Group C ===
| Pos | Team | Pld | W | D | L | GF | GA | GD | Pts | HRG | IBY | BTR | HAR |
|---|---|---|---|---|---|---|---|---|---|---|---|---|---|
| 1 | Hapoel Ramat Gan (A) | 6 | 5 | 1 | 0 | 8 | 0 | +8 | 16 | | 1–0 | 1–0 | 3–0 |
| 2 | Ironi Bat Yam (A) | 6 | 2 | 1 | 3 | 3 | 5 | −2 | 7 | 0–1 | | 2–1 | 1–0 |
| 3 | Beitar Tel Aviv Ramla | 6 | 1 | 3 | 2 | 4 | 4 | 0 | 6 | 0–0 | 2–0 | | 1–1 |
| 4 | Hakoah Amidar Ramat Gan | 6 | 0 | 3 | 3 | 1 | 7 | −6 | 3 | 0–2 | 0–0 | 0–0 | |

Source: football.org.il (in Hebrew)
Rules for classification: 1st points; 2nd goal difference; 3rd matches won; 4th goals scored; 5th head-to-head; 6th decision match
(A) Advanced to the quarterfinals

=== Group D ===
| Pos | Team | Pld | W | D | L | GF | GA | GD | Pts | SNT | HJE | HAS | MBS |
|---|---|---|---|---|---|---|---|---|---|---|---|---|---|
| 1 | Sektzia Nes Tziona (A) | 6 | 3 | 2 | 1 | 10 | 6 | +4 | 11 | | 3–3 | 1–2 | 1–0 |
| 2 | Hapoel Jerusalem (A) | 6 | 2 | 3 | 1 | 14 | 8 | +6 | 9 | 1–1 | | 4–0 | 2–2 |
| 3 | Hapoel Ashkelon | 6 | 1 | 3 | 2 | 6 | 11 | −5 | 6 | 0–2 | 2–1 | | 1–1 |
| 4 | Maccabi Be'er Sheva | 6 | 0 | 2 | 4 | 3 | 10 | −7 | 2 | 0–2 | 0–3 | 1–1 | |

Source: football.org.il (in Hebrew)
Rules for classification: 1st points; 2nd goal difference; 3rd matches won; 4th goals scored; 5th head-to-head; 6th decision match
(A) Advanced to the quarterfinals

== Elimination rounds ==
=== Quarterfinals ===
The matches were played on 12 November 2011.

| Home team | Score^{1} | Away team |
|---|---|---|
| Maccabi Ahi Nazareth | 1 – 1 | Ironi Bat Yam |
2 – 2 after extra time – Ironi Bat Yam won 6–5 on penalties
| Hapoel Ramat Gan | 1 – 0 | Maccabi Herzliya |
| Hapoel Herzliya | 2 – 0 | Maccabi Umm al-Fahm |
| 'Hapoel Jerusalem | 2 – 1 | Sektzia Nes Tziona |

^{1} Score after 90 minutes

=== Semifinals ===
The draw for the Semifinals took place on 14 November 2011, with matches played on 29 November 2011.

| Home team | Score^{1} | Away team |
|---|---|---|
| Hapoel Ramat Gan | 1 – 0 | Hapoel Herzliya |
| Ironi Bat Yam | 1 – 0 | Hapoel Jerusalem |

^{1} Score after 90 minutes

=== Final ===
13 December 2011
18:00 IST

| Hapoel Ramat Gan | 1 – 0 | Ironi Bat Yam |
|---|---|---|
| Thiam Mammadou Touré 27' | Report |

Haberfeld Stadium, Rishon LeZion
Attendance: 620

== See also ==
- 2011–12 Toto Cup Al
- 2011–12 Liga Leumit
- 2011–12 Israel State Cup
