= 2007–08 Toto Cup Artzit =

Toto Cup Artzit
- Season: 2007–08
- Champions: Maccabi Ironi Kiryat Ata

The 2007–08 Toto Cup Artzit was the 9th time the cup was being contested. The final was played at Sar-Tov Stadium (HaKufsa) in Netanya on 11 December 2007.

The winners were Maccabi Ironi Kiryat Ata, beating Beitar Shimshon Tel Aviv 3–0 in the final.

== Group stage ==
=== Group A ===
| Pos | Team | Pld | W | D | L | GF | GA | GD | Pts | BST | SNT | MTC | HBJ | SRH | KSL |
|---|---|---|---|---|---|---|---|---|---|---|---|---|---|---|---|
| 1 | Beitar Shimshon Tel Aviv (A) | 10 | 6 | 0 | 4 | 18 | 11 | +7 | 18 | — | 0–1 | 1–2 | 1–2 | 3–2 | 4–2 |
| 2 | Sektzia Nes Tziona (A) | 10 | 5 | 3 | 2 | 15 | 10 | +5 | 18 | 1–0 | — | 1–2 | 1–1 | 3–0 | 3–2 |
| 3 | Maccabi Ironi Tirat HaCarmel | 10 | 5 | 3 | 2 | 11 | 9 | +2 | 18 | 0–2 | 0–0 | — | 0–2 | 1–1 | 2–1 |
| 4 | Hapoel Bnei Jadeidi | 10 | 5 | 2 | 3 | 12 | 14 | −2 | 17 | 0–4 | 0–0 | 1–2 | — | 2–0 | 2–1 |
| 5 | Maccabi HaShikma Ramat Hen | 10 | 3 | 2 | 5 | 14 | 16 | −2 | 11 | 0–1 | 2–3 | 0–2 | 5–0 | — | 1–1 |
| 6 | Hapoel Kfar Shalem | 10 | 0 | 2 | 8 | 11 | 21 | −10 | 2 | 1–2 | 2–3 | 0–0 | 0–2 | 1–2 | — |

Source: Toto Cup Artzit 2007/2008 IFA (in Hebrew)
Rules for classification: 1st points; 2nd goal difference; 3rd matches won; 4th goals scored; 5th head-to-head; 6th decision match
(A) Advanced to the Semifinals

=== Group B ===
| Pos | Team | Pld | W | D | L | GF | GA | GD | Pts | IKA | MKK | HBT | HMK | HJE | HAS |
|---|---|---|---|---|---|---|---|---|---|---|---|---|---|---|---|
| 1 | Maccabi Kiryat Ata (A) | 10 | 5 | 3 | 2 | 15 | 9 | +6 | 18 | — | 3–1 | 1–1 | 1–0 | 1–3 | 3–2 |
| 2 | Maccabi Kafr Kanna (A) | 10 | 5 | 2 | 3 | 10 | 8 | +2 | 17 | 1–0 | — | 0–2 | 0–0 | 2–0 | 1–0 |
| 3 | Hapoel Bnei Tamra | 10 | 4 | 3 | 3 | 13 | 11 | +2 | 15 | 0–3 | 0–1 | — | 2–0 | 2–2 | 2–0 |
| 4 | Hapoel Marmorek | 10 | 3 | 4 | 3 | 11 | 10 | +1 | 13 | 0–0 | 1–0 | 2–2 | — | 5–3 | 2–0 |
| 5 | Hapoel Jerusalem | 10 | 2 | 5 | 3 | 14 | 16 | −2 | 11 | 1–1 | 1–1 | 0–2 | 1–1 | — | 2–0 |
| 6 | Hapoel Ashkelon | 10 | 2 | 1 | 7 | 7 | 16 | −9 | 7 | 0–2 | 1–3 | 2–0 | 1–0 | 1–1 | — |

Source: Toto Cup Artzit 2007/2008 (Group B) IFA (in Hebrew)
Rules for classification: 1st points; 2nd goal difference; 3rd matches won; 4th goals scored; 5th head-to-head; 6th decision match
(A) Advanced to the Semifinals

=== Semifinals ===
4 December 2007
14:30

| Sektzia Nes Tziona | 0–0 (a.e.t.) | Maccabi Ironi Kiryat Ata |
|---|---|---|
| | Report |
Penalties
| Badash (penalty missed); Levy (penalty scored); Amar (penalty missed); Buchovza (penalty scored); Ohana (penalty missed) | 2–3 | (penalty missed) Falash; (penalty missed) Zahko; (penalty scored) Danino; (penalty missed) Siso; (penalty scored) Dahan |

Sar-Tov Stadium, Netanya
Referee: Roee Reinschreiber

4 December 2007
14:30

| Maccabi Kafr Kanna | 1–2 | Beitar Shimshon Tel Aviv |
|---|---|---|
| Goldenberg 45' | Report | Alyan 3', 35' |

Ness Ziona Stadium
Referee: Eliyahu Kasapo

=== Final ===
11 December 2007
17:00

| Maccabi Ironi Kiryat Ata | 3–0 | Beitar Shimshon Tel Aviv |
|---|---|---|
| Rol 9', 59'; Zahko 66' | Report |

Sar-Tov Stadium, Netanya
Referee: Orel Grinfeld

== See also ==
- Toto Cup
- 2007–08 Liga Artzit
- 2007–08 in Israeli football
