= 2001–02 Liga Artzit =

The 2001–02 Liga Artzit season saw Hapoel Jerusalem win the title and promotion to Liga Leumit alongside runners-up Hapoel Nazareth Illit. Hapoel Tayibe (following a points deduction) and Maccabi Yavne were relegated to Liga Alef.

== Final table ==
Pos	Team	Pld	W	D	L	GF	GA	GD	Pts	Promotion or relegation
1	Hapoel Jerusalem	33	18	9	6	48	20	+28	63	Promoted to Liga Leumit
2	Hapoel Nazareth Illit	33	18	8	7	47	27	+20	62	Promoted to Liga Leumit
3	Beitar/Shimshon Tel Aviv	33	17	8	8	49	29	+20	59	
4	Maccabi Ironi Kiryat Ata	33	17	7	9	55	45	+10	58	
5	Hapoel Ashkelon	33	15	6	12	41	25	+16	51	
6	Hapoel Acre	33	10	13	10	33	34	−1	43	
7	Ironi Nir Ramat HaSharon	33	11	9	13	43	51	−8	42	
8	Ironi Kiryat Shmona	33	10	9	14	50	56	−6	39	
9	Hapoel Bat Yam	33	7	11	15	31	49	−18	32	
10	Hapoel Majd al-Krum	33	4	19	10	38	50	−12	31	
11	Hapoel Tayibe	33	7	10	16	38	48	−10	30 (Note: One point deducted.)	Relegated to Liga Alef
12	Maccabi Yavne	33	6	7	20	23	62	−39	25	Relegated to Liga Alef

Source: rsssf.com
