= 2005–06 Liga Artzit =

2005-06 competition in Israel

The 2005–06 Liga Artzit season saw Hapoel Bnei Lod win the title and promotion to Liga Leumit alongside runners-up Maccabi Ahi Nazareth. Maccabi Tzur Shalom and Tzafririm Holon were relegated to Liga Alef.

== Final table ==
Pos	Team	Pld	W	D	L	GF	GA	GD	Pts	Promotion or relegation
1	Hapoel Bnei Lod	33	17	9	7	48	31	+17	60	Promoted to Liga Leumit
2	Maccabi Ahi Nazareth	33	15	13	5	51	33	+18	58	Promoted to Liga Leumit
3	Maccabi Ironi Kiryat Ata	33	14	8	11	42	43	−1	50	
4	Hapoel Marmorek	33	12	10	11	38	26	+12	46	
5	Maccabi Kafr Kanna	33	13	7	13	36	41	−5	46	
6	Beitar Shimshon Tel Aviv	33	11	9	13	43	50	−7	42	
7	Maccabi Ironi Tirat HaCarmel	33	9	14	10	34	35	−1	41	
8	Hapoel Herzliya	33	10	11	12	34	39	−5	41	
9	Maccabi HaShikma Ramat Hen	33	11	6	16	33	44	−11	39	
10	Hapoel Ramat Gan	33	11	14	8	42	27	+15	38 (Note: Nine points deducted.)	
11	Maccabi Tzur Shalom	33	7	13	13	33	42	−9	34	Relegated to Liga Alef
12	Tzafririm Holon	33	7	8	18	33	56	−23	20	Relegated to Liga Alef

Source: rsssf.com
