= 2003–04 Liga Bet =

Israeli football season

The 2003–04 Liga Bet season saw Hapoel Bnei Jadeidi, Hapoel Afula, Hapoel Qalansawe and Hapoel Bnei Lod win their regional divisions and promoted to Liga Alef.

At the bottom, Maccabi Bir al-Maksur (from North A division), Hapoel Bnei Nazareth (from North B division), M.M. Giv'at Shmuel and Maccabi Montefiore (from South A division) were all relegated to Liga Gimel. However, Beitar Acre (from North A division), Maccabi Daliyat al-Karmel (from North B division), Maccabi Yehud (from South A division), Maccabi Kiryat Ekron and Hapoel Oranit (from South B division), which finished in the relegation zone, were all reprieved from relegation, after several vacancies were created in Liga Bet for the 2004–05 season, mostly due to withdrawals and mergers of clubs.

== North A Division ==
| Pos | Team | Pld | W | D | L | GF | GA | GD | Pts | Promotion or relegation |
|---|---|---|---|---|---|---|---|---|---|---|
| 1 | Hapoel Bnei Jadeidi | 30 | 22 | 6 | 2 | 69 | 16 | +53 | 72 | Promoted to Liga Alef |
| 2 | Ironi Nahariya | 30 | 15 | 11 | 4 | 65 | 27 | +38 | 50 (Note: Six points deducted) | |
| 3 | Maccabi Sektzia Ma'alot | 30 | 13 | 9 | 8 | 45 | 32 | +13 | 48 | |
| 4 | Hapoel Karmiel | 30 | 13 | 4 | 13 | 61 | 55 | +6 | 43 | |
| 5 | Hapoel Deir Hanna | 30 | 11 | 7 | 12 | 37 | 44 | −7 | 40 | |
| 6 | Hapoel Bnei Manda | 30 | 9 | 12 | 9 | 43 | 36 | +7 | 39 | |
| 7 | Hapoel Sakhnin | 30 | 12 | 3 | 15 | 38 | 60 | −22 | 39 | |
| 8 | Beitar Safed | 30 | 10 | 9 | 11 | 36 | 43 | −7 | 38 (Note: One point deducted) | |
| 9 | Beitar Haifa | 30 | 11 | 5 | 14 | 52 | 55 | −3 | 38 | |
| 10 | Hapoel Peki'in | 30 | 10 | 8 | 12 | 23 | 39 | −16 | 38 | |
| 11 | Tzeirei Nahf | 30 | 11 | 5 | 14 | 47 | 59 | −12 | 38 | Withdrew |
| 12 | Hapoel Arraba | 30 | 11 | 4 | 15 | 46 | 52 | −6 | 37 | Withdrew |
| 13 | Bnei Abu Snan | 30 | 11 | 8 | 11 | 39 | 39 | 0 | 37 (Note: Four points deducted) | |
| 14 | Hapoel Yanuh | 30 | 11 | 3 | 16 | 52 | 64 | −12 | 36 | |
| 15 | Maccabi Bir al-Maksur | 30 | 8 | 9 | 13 | 54 | 55 | −1 | 33 | Relegated to Liga Gimel |
| 16 | Beitar Acre | 30 | 7 | 7 | 16 | 39 | 70 | −31 | 28 | Reprieved from relegation |

== North B Division ==
| Pos | Team | Pld | W | D | L | GF | GA | GD | Pts | Promotion or relegation |
|---|---|---|---|---|---|---|---|---|---|---|
| 1 | Hapoel Afula | 30 | 22 | 6 | 2 | 72 | 18 | +54 | 72 | Promoted to Liga Alef |
| 2 | Hapoel Umm al-Fahm | 30 | 22 | 4 | 4 | 72 | 17 | +55 | 70 | |
| 3 | Hapoel Daliyat al-Karmel | 30 | 15 | 9 | 6 | 65 | 36 | +29 | 54 | |
| 4 | Hapoel Yafa | 30 | 15 | 9 | 6 | 61 | 36 | +25 | 54 | |
| 5 | Hapoel Bir al-Maksur | 30 | 14 | 7 | 9 | 51 | 42 | +9 | 49 | Withdrew |
| 6 | Hapoel Ar'ara | 30 | 13 | 6 | 11 | 54 | 46 | +8 | 45 | |
| 7 | Hapoel Iksal | 30 | 9 | 13 | 8 | 46 | 41 | +5 | 40 | |
| 8 | Hapoel Ahva Haifa | 30 | 11 | 7 | 12 | 47 | 51 | −4 | 40 | |
| 9 | Hapoel Tel Hanan | 30 | 11 | 4 | 15 | 50 | 53 | −3 | 37 | |
| 10 | Hapoel Bnei Tamra | 30 | 8 | 11 | 11 | 39 | 54 | −15 | 35 | |
| 11 | Maccabi Kafr Qara | 30 | 8 | 9 | 13 | 47 | 54 | −7 | 33 | |
| 12 | Hapoel Mo'atza Ezorit Galil Tahton | 30 | 9 | 6 | 15 | 29 | 56 | −27 | 33 | |
| 13 | Hapoel Yokneam | 30 | 7 | 11 | 12 | 38 | 61 | −23 | 32 | |
| 14 | Ironi Sayid Umm al-Fahm | 30 | 6 | 12 | 12 | 37 | 41 | −4 | 30 | |
| 15 | Hapoel Bnei Nazareth | 30 | 5 | 5 | 20 | 30 | 74 | −44 | 20 | Relegated to Liga Gimel |
| 16 | Maccabi Daliyat al-Karmel | 30 | 4 | 3 | 23 | 40 | 98 | −58 | 15 | Reprieved from relegation |

== South A Division ==
| Pos | Team | Pld | W | D | L | GF | GA | GD | Pts | Promotion or relegation |
|---|---|---|---|---|---|---|---|---|---|---|
| 1 | Hapoel Qalansawe | 30 | 20 | 6 | 4 | 66 | 24 | +42 | 66 | Promoted to Liga Alef |
| 2 | Hapoel Azor | 30 | 19 | 5 | 6 | 56 | 32 | +24 | 62 | |
| 3 | Ironi Kfar Yona | 30 | 18 | 7 | 5 | 61 | 26 | +35 | 61 | Merged with Maccabi Kfar Yona |
| 4 | Hapoel Hod HaSharon | 30 | 16 | 5 | 9 | 72 | 39 | +33 | 53 | |
| 5 | Hapoel Mahane Yehuda | 30 | 15 | 7 | 8 | 63 | 38 | +25 | 52 | |
| 6 | Hapoel Kiryat Ono | 30 | 12 | 5 | 13 | 48 | 50 | −2 | 41 | |
| 7 | Maccabi Holon Bat Yam | 30 | 11 | 7 | 12 | 42 | 45 | −3 | 40 | |
| 8 | Beitar Ramat Gan | 30 | 10 | 10 | 10 | 35 | 34 | +1 | 40 | |
| 9 | Hapoel Hadera | 30 | 11 | 7 | 12 | 41 | 33 | +8 | 40 | |
| 10 | Beitar Jaffa | 30 | 12 | 4 | 14 | 48 | 57 | −9 | 40 | |
| 11 | Maccabi Kfar Yona | 30 | 10 | 7 | 13 | 37 | 52 | −15 | 37 | |
| 12 | Otzma Holon | 30 | 8 | 12 | 10 | 31 | 49 | −18 | 36 | |
| 13 | Maccabi Bnei Tira | 30 | 9 | 5 | 16 | 37 | 46 | −9 | 32 | |
| 14 | M.M. Giv'at Shmuel | 30 | 9 | 5 | 16 | 47 | 70 | −23 | 32 | Relegated to Liga Gimel |
| 15 | Maccabi Montefiore | 30 | 5 | 9 | 16 | 39 | 65 | −26 | 24 | Relegated to Liga Gimel |
| 16 | Maccabi Yehud | 30 | 3 | 3 | 24 | 26 | 89 | −63 | 12 | Reprieved from relegation |

== South B Division ==
| Pos | Team | Pld | W | D | L | GF | GA | GD | Pts | Promotion or qualification |
|---|---|---|---|---|---|---|---|---|---|---|
| 1 | Hapoel Bnei Lod | 30 | 21 | 5 | 4 | 49 | 21 | +28 | 68 | Promoted to Liga Alef |
| 2 | Hapoel Yeruham | 30 | 18 | 6 | 6 | 53 | 27 | +26 | 60 | |
| 3 | A.S. Eilat | 30 | 14 | 8 | 8 | 54 | 41 | +13 | 50 | |
| 4 | Hapoel Namal Ashdod | 30 | 15 | 4 | 11 | 39 | 29 | +10 | 49 | Withdrew |
| 5 | Maccabi Ben Zvi | 30 | 11 | 9 | 10 | 37 | 37 | 0 | 42 | |
| 6 | Maccabi Kiryat Malakhi | 30 | 11 | 7 | 12 | 40 | 50 | −10 | 40 | |
| 7 | Maccabi Ironi Sderot | 30 | 11 | 7 | 12 | 44 | 38 | +6 | 40 | |
| 8 | Hapoel Arad | 30 | 11 | 7 | 12 | 39 | 44 | −5 | 40 | |
| 9 | Hapoel Masos/Segev Shalom | 30 | 11 | 6 | 13 | 52 | 45 | +7 | 39 | Withdrew |
| 10 | Hapoel Or Yehuda | 30 | 10 | 8 | 12 | 43 | 43 | 0 | 38 | |
| 11 | Ironi Ramla | 30 | 11 | 5 | 14 | 54 | 54 | 0 | 38 | |
| 12 | Hapoel Merhavim | 30 | 11 | 5 | 14 | 42 | 47 | −5 | 38 | |
| 13 | Hapoel Bnei Lakhish | 30 | 9 | 10 | 11 | 33 | 35 | −2 | 37 | |
| 14 | Maccabi Jerusalem/Ma'ale Adumim | 30 | 9 | 8 | 13 | 40 | 53 | −13 | 35 | |
| 15 | Maccabi Kiryat Ekron | 30 | 9 | 4 | 17 | 32 | 63 | −31 | 31 | Reprieved from relegation |
| 16 | Hapoel Oranit | 30 | 6 | 5 | 19 | 36 | 60 | −24 | 23 | Reprieved from relegation |
