= 2007–08 Liga Artzit =

The 2007–08 Liga Artzit season began on 17 August 2007 and 24 May 2008. Hapoel Jerusalem won the title and were promoted to Liga Leumit alongside runners-up Maccabi Ironi Kiryat Ata. Maccabi HaShikma Ramat Hen and Hapoel Kfar Shalem were relegated to Liga Alef

== Final table ==
Pos	Team	Pld	W	D	L	GF	GA	GD	Pts	Promotion or relegation
1	Hapoel Jerusalem	33	20	10	3	49	19	+30	70	Promoted to Liga Leumit
2	Maccabi Ironi Kiryat Ata	33	19	4	10	41	28	+13	61	Promoted to Liga Leumit
3	Hapoel Bnei Jadeidi	33	14	8	11	39	29	+10	50	
4	Hapoel Ashkelon	33	12	14	7	36	32	+4	48 (Note: 2 points deducted.)	
5	Maccabi Kafr Kanna	33	13	10	10	32	30	+2	48 (Note: 1 point deducted.)	
6	Bnei Tamra	33	14	8	11	37	30	+7	47 (Note: 3 points deducted.)	
7	Sektzia Nes Tziona	33	10	14	9	32	22	+10	44	
8	Hapoel Marmorek	33	12	8	13	34	35	−1	44	
9	Beitar Shimshon Tel Aviv	33	12	7	14	36	35	+1	43	
10	Maccabi Tirat HaCarmel	33	10	6	17	27	46	−19	36	
11	Maccabi HaShikma Ramat Hen	33	8	7	18	42	57	−15	31	Relegated to Liga Alef
12	Hapoel Kfar Shalem	33	4	4	25	26	68	−42	16	Relegated to Liga Alef

== Results ==
=== First round ===
Home team	Score	Away team
Round 1		
Hapoel Marmorek	2–0	Hapoel Jerusalem
Maccabi Kafr Kanna	2–1	Hapoel Ashkelon
Beitar Shimshon Tel Aviv	5–1	Maccabi Tirat Carmel
Bnei Tamra	0–1	Maccabi HaShikma Ramat Hen
Hapoel Kfar Shalem	0–3	Hapoel Bnei Jadeidi
Maccabi Ironi Kiryat Ata	2–0	Sektzia Nes Tziona
Round 2		
Hapoel Jerusalem	2–0	Sektzia Nes Tziona
Hapoel Bnei Jadeidi	3–1	Maccabi Ironi Kiryat Ata
Maccabi HaShikma Ramat Hen	5–1	Hapoel Kfar Shalem
Maccabi Tirat Carmel	2–2	Bnei Tamra
Hapoel Ashkelon	0–0	Beitar Shimshon Tel Aviv
Hapoel Marmorek	3–1	Maccabi Kafr Kanna
Round 3		
Beitar Shimshon Tel Aviv	2–0	Hapoel Marmorek
Bnei Tamra	2–1	Hapoel Ashkelon
Hapoel Kfar Shalem	1–1	Maccabi Tirat Carmel
Maccabi Ironi Kiryat Ata	1–3	Maccabi HaShikma Ramat Hen
Sektzia Nes Tziona	3–0	Hapoel Bnei Jadeidi
Maccabi Kafr Kanna	1–0	Hapoel Jerusalem
Round 4		
Hapoel Jerusalem	0–2	Hapoel Bnei Jadeidi
Maccabi HaShikma Ramat Hen	0–0	Sektzia Nes Tziona
Maccabi Tirat Carmel	2–3	Maccabi Ironi Kiryat Ata
Hapoel Ashkelon	1–1	Hapoel Kfar Shalem
Hapoel Marmorek	0–0	Bnei Tamra
Maccabi Kafr Kanna	0–0	Beitar Shimshon Tel Aviv
Round 5		
Beitar Shimshon Tel Aviv	0–1	Hapoel Jerusalem
Bnei Tamra	2–1	Maccabi Kafr Kanna
Hapoel Kfar Shalem	0–2	Hapoel Marmorek
Maccabi Ironi Kiryat Ata	1–0	Hapoel Ashkelon
Sektzia Nes Tziona	0–1	Maccabi Tirat Carmel
Hapoel Bnei Jadeidi	1–2	Maccabi HaShikma Ramat Hen
Round 6		
Maccabi Tirat Carmel	1–0	Hapoel Bnei Jadeidi
Hapoel Ashkelon	0–0	Sektzia Nes Tziona
Hapoel Marmorek	2–0	Maccabi Ironi Kiryat Ata
Maccabi Kafr Kanna	2–0	Hapoel Kfar Shalem
Beitar Shimshon Tel Aviv	2–1	Bnei Tamra
Hapoel Jerusalem	1–1	Maccabi HaShikma Ramat Hen
Round 7		
Bnei Tamra	1–2	Hapoel Jerusalem
Hapoel Kfar Shalem	0–2	Beitar Shimshon Tel Aviv
Maccabi Ironi Kiryat Ata	0–1	Maccabi Kafr Kanna
Sektzia Nes Tziona	1–1	Hapoel Marmorek
Hapoel Bnei Jadeidi	3–0	Hapoel Ashkelon
Maccabi HaShikma Ramat Hen	3–0	Maccabi Tirat Carmel
Round 8		
Hapoel Jerusalem	2–0	Maccabi Tirat Carmel
Hapoel Ashkelon	3–2	Maccabi HaShikma Ramat Hen
Hapoel Marmorek	2–3	Hapoel Bnei Jadeidi
Maccabi Kafr Kanna	0–1	Sektzia Nes Tziona
Beitar Shimshon Tel Aviv	1–2	Maccabi Ironi Kiryat Ata
Bnei Tamra	1–0	Hapoel Kfar Shalem
Round 9		
Hapoel Kfar Shalem	0–4	Hapoel Jerusalem
Maccabi Ironi Kiryat Ata	2–1	Bnei Tamra
Sektzia Nes Tziona	1–0	Beitar Shimshon Tel Aviv
Hapoel Bnei Jadeidi	1–1	Maccabi Kafr Kanna
Maccabi HaShikma Ramat Hen	0–1	Hapoel Marmorek
Maccabi Tirat Carmel	1–2	Hapoel Ashkelon
Round 10		
Hapoel Jerusalem	4–0	Hapoel Ashkelon
Hapoel Marmorek	1–0	Maccabi Tirat Carmel
Maccabi Kafr Kanna	2–1	Maccabi HaShikma Ramat Hen
Beitar Shimshon Tel Aviv	0–2	Hapoel Bnei Jadeidi
Bnei Tamra	0–0	Sektzia Nes Tziona
Hapoel Kfar Shalem	0–2	Maccabi Ironi Kiryat Ata
Round 11		
Maccabi Ironi Kiryat Ata	0–1	Hapoel Jerusalem
Sektzia Nes Tziona	3–0	Hapoel Kfar Shalem
Hapoel Bnei Jadeidi	0–0	Bnei Tamra
Maccabi HaShikma Ramat Hen	0–2	Beitar Shimshon Tel Aviv
Maccabi Tirat Carmel	0–2	Maccabi Kafr Kanna
Hapoel Ashkelon	1–0	Hapoel Marmorek

=== Second round ===
Home team	Score	Away team
Round 12		
Hapoel Jerusalem	0–0	Hapoel Marmorek
Hapoel Ashkelon	1–1	Maccabi Kafr Kanna
Maccabi Tirat Carmel	1–0	Beitar Shimshon Tel Aviv
Maccabi HaShikma Ramat Hen	0–2	Bnei Tamra
Hapoel Bnei Jadeidi	3–0	Hapoel Kfar Shalem
Sektzia Nes Tziona	0–1	Maccabi Ironi Kiryat Ata
Round 13		
Sektzia Nes Tziona	0–1	Hapoel Jerusalem
Maccabi Ironi Kiryat Ata	0–0	Hapoel Bnei Jadeidi
Hapoel Kfar Shalem	2–5	Maccabi HaShikma Ramat Hen
Bnei Tamra	1–0	Maccabi Tirat Carmel
Beitar Shimshon Tel Aviv	3–2	Hapoel Ashkelon
Maccabi Kafr Kanna	0–1	Hapoel Marmorek
Round 14		
Hapoel Jerusalem	2–0	Maccabi Kafr Kanna
Hapoel Marmorek	0–1	Beitar Shimshon Tel Aviv
Hapoel Ashkelon	2–1	Bnei Tamra
Maccabi Tirat Carmel	2–1	Hapoel Kfar Shalem
Maccabi HaShikma Ramat Hen	0–2	Maccabi Ironi Kiryat Ata
Hapoel Bnei Jadeidi	2–1	Sektzia Nes Tziona
Round 15		
Hapoel Bnei Jadeidi	0–0	Hapoel Jerusalem
Sektzia Nes Tziona	1–1	Maccabi HaShikma Ramat Hen
Maccabi Ironi Kiryat Ata	1–0	Maccabi Tirat Carmel
Hapoel Kfar Shalem	0–1	Hapoel Ashkelon
Bnei Tamra	3–1	Hapoel Marmorek
Beitar Shimshon Tel Aviv	2–1	Maccabi Kafr Kanna
Round 16		
Hapoel Jerusalem	2–0	Beitar Shimshon Tel Aviv
Maccabi Kafr Kanna	2–2	Bnei Tamra
Hapoel Marmorek	2–1	Hapoel Kfar Shalem
Hapoel Ashkelon	3–1	Maccabi Ironi Kiryat Ata
Maccabi Tirat Carmel	1–0	Sektzia Nes Tziona
Maccabi HaShikma Ramat Hen	1–1	Hapoel Bnei Jadeidi
Round 17		
Maccabi HaShikma Ramat Hen	0–1	Hapoel Jerusalem
Hapoel Bnei Jadeidi	4–0	Maccabi Tirat Carmel
Sektzia Nes Tziona	0–0	Hapoel Ashkelon
Maccabi Ironi Kiryat Ata	4–1	Hapoel Marmorek
Hapoel Kfar Shalem	1–2	Maccabi Kafr Kanna
Bnei Tamra	1–3	Beitar Shimshon Tel Aviv
Round 18		
Hapoel Jerusalem	2–0	Bnei Tamra
Beitar Shimshon Tel Aviv	1–2	Hapoel Kfar Shalem
Maccabi Kafr Kanna	1–1	Maccabi Ironi Kiryat Ata
Hapoel Marmorek	0–1	Sektzia Nes Tziona
Hapoel Ashkelon	0–0	Hapoel Bnei Jadeidi
Maccabi Tirat Carmel	3–2	Maccabi HaShikma Ramat Hen
Round 19		
Maccabi Tirat Carmel	1–1	Hapoel Jerusalem
Maccabi HaShikma Ramat Hen	1–1	Hapoel Ashkelon
Hapoel Bnei Jadeidi	0–1	Hapoel Marmorek
Sektzia Nes Tziona	1–1	Maccabi Kafr Kanna
Maccabi Ironi Kiryat Ata	1–0	Beitar Shimshon Tel Aviv
Hapoel Kfar Shalem	1–0	Bnei Tamra
Round 20		
Hapoel Jerusalem	3–1	Hapoel Kfar Shalem
Bnei Tamra	1–0	Maccabi Ironi Kiryat Ata
Beitar Shimshon Tel Aviv	1–1	Sektzia Nes Tziona
Maccabi Kafr Kanna	1–0	Hapoel Bnei Jadeidi
Hapoel Marmorek	2–0	Maccabi HaShikma Ramat Hen
Hapoel Ashkelon	0–0	Maccabi Tirat Carmel
Round 21		
Hapoel Ashkelon	0–0	Hapoel Jerusalem
Maccabi Tirat Carmel	1–1	Hapoel Marmorek
Maccabi HaShikma Ramat Hen	0–0	Maccabi Kafr Kanna
Hapoel Bnei Jadeidi	1–0	Beitar Shimshon Tel Aviv
Sektzia Nes Tziona	0–0	Bnei Tamra
Maccabi Ironi Kiryat Ata	4–1	Hapoel Kfar Shalem
Round 22		
Hapoel Jerusalem	2–1	Maccabi Ironi Kiryat Ata
Hapoel Kfar Shalem	0–2	Sektzia Nes Tziona
Bnei Tamra	0–1	Hapoel Bnei Jadeidi
Beitar Shimshon Tel Aviv	0–2	Maccabi HaShikma Ramat Hen
Maccabi Kafr Kanna	1–0	Maccabi Tirat Carmel
Hapoel Marmorek	0–1	'Hapoel Ashkelon

=== Third round ===
Home team	Score	Away team
Round 23		
Maccabi Ironi Kiryat Ata	1–0	Hapoel Kfar Shalem
Maccabi HaShikma Ramat Hen	0–3	Sektzia Nes Tziona
Maccabi Kafr Kanna	0–0	Hapoel Jerusalem
Hapoel Marmorek	4–0	Hapoel Bnei Jadeidi
Beitar Shimshon Tel Aviv	0–1	Bnei Tamra
Hapoel Ashkelon	2–0	Maccabi Tirat Carmel
Round 24		
Maccabi Ironi Kiryat Ata	1–0	Hapoel Marmorek
Maccabi Tirat Carmel	0–2	Hapoel Ashkelon
Hapoel Bnei Jadeidi	1–0	Maccabi Kafr Kanna
Hapoel Jerusalem	2–2	Beitar Shimshon Tel Aviv
Hapoel Kfar Shalem	1–1	Sektzia Nes Tziona
Bnei Tamra	2–1	Maccabi HaShikma Ramat Hen
Round 25		
Maccabi HaShikma Ramat Hen	1–2	Maccabi Tirat Carmel
Maccabi Kafr Kanna	1–0	Maccabi Ironi Kiryat Ata
Hapoel Marmorek	0–0	Hapoel Kfar Shalem
Hapoel Ashkelon	1–1	Hapoel Jerusalem
Beitar Shimshon Tel Aviv	0–3	Hapoel Bnei Jadeidi
Sektzia Nes Tziona	0–2	Bnei Tamra
Round 26		
Maccabi Ironi Kiryat Ata	2–0	Beitar Shimshon Tel Aviv
Maccabi Tirat Carmel	1–1	Sektzia Nes Tziona
Hapoel Bnei Jadeidi'	0–2	Hapoel Ashkelon
Hapoel Jerusalem	3–1	Maccabi HaShikma Ramat Hen
Hapoel Marmorek	0–2	Maccabi Kafr Kanna
Hapoel Kfar Shalem	0–2	Bnei Tamra
Round 27		
Maccabi HaShikma Ramat Hen	1–1	Hapoel Bnei Jadeidi'
Maccabi Kafr Kanna	2–0	Hapoel Kfar Shalem
Hapoel Ashkelon	0–0	Maccabi Ironi Kiryat Ata
Bnei Tamra	1–0	Maccabi Tirat Carmel
Beitar Shimshon Tel Aviv	0–0	Hapoel Marmorek
Sektzia Nes Tziona	0–0	Hapoel Jerusalem
Round 28		
Maccabi Ironi Kiryat Ata	3–1	Maccabi HaShikma Ramat Hen
Maccabi Kafr Kanna	0–0	Beitar Shimshon Tel Aviv
Hapoel Bnei Jadeidi	0–1	Sektzia Nes Tziona
Hapoel Jerusalem	3–1	Bnei Tamra
Hapoel Marmorek	1–1	Hapoel Ashkelon
Hapoel Kfar Shalem	1–2	Maccabi Tirat Carmel
Round 29		
Maccabi HaShikma Ramat Hen	3–4	Hapoel Marmorek
Maccabi Tirat Carmel	0–1	Hapoel Jerusalem
Hapoel Ashkelon	1–1	Maccabi Kafr Kanna
Bnei Tamra	2–0	Hapoel Bnei Jadeidi
Beitar Shimshon Tel Aviv	2–0	Hapoel Kfar Shalem
Sektzia Nes Tziona	0–1	Maccabi Ironi Kiryat Ata
Round 30		
Maccabi Ironi Kiryat Ata	1–1	Bnei Tamra
Maccabi Kafr Kanna	0–2	Maccabi HaShikma Ramat Hen
Hapoel Bnei Jadeidi	2–0	Maccabi Tirat Carmel
Hapoel Jerusalem	3–2	Hapoel Kfar Shalem
Hapoel Marmorek	1–4	Sektzia Nes Tziona
Beitar Shimshon Tel Aviv	2–1	Hapoel Ashkelon
Round 31		
Maccabi HaShikma Ramat Hen	0–5	Beitar Shimshon Tel Aviv
Maccabi Tirat Carmel	0–1	Maccabi Ironi Kiryat Ata
Hapoel Jerusalem	1–1	Hapoel Bnei Jadeidi
Hapoel Kfar Shalem	1–2	Hapoel Ashkelon
Bnei Tamra	0–0	Hapoel Marmorek
Sektzia Nes Tziona	4–0	Maccabi Kafr Kanna
Round 32		
Maccabi Ironi Kiryat Ata	0–2	Hapoel Jerusalem
Maccabi Kafr Kanna	0–1	Bnei Tamra
Hapoel Bnei Jadeidi	1–3	Hapoel Kfar Shalem
Hapoel Marmorek	0–2	Maccabi Tirat Carmel
Hapoel Ashkelon	2–1	Maccabi HaShikma Ramat Hen
Beitar Shimshon Tel Aviv	0–0	Sektzia Nes Tziona
Round 33		
Maccabi Tirat Carmel	1–3	Maccabi Kafr Kanna
Hapoel Bnei Jadeidi	0–1	Maccabi Ironi Kiryat Ata
Hapoel Jerusalem	2–1	Hapoel Marmorek
Hapoel Kfar Shalem	5–1	Maccabi HaShikma Ramat Hen
Bnei Tamra	4–0	Beitar Shimshon Tel Aviv
Sektzia Nes Tziona	2–2	Hapoel Ashkelon

== Top goalscorers ==
Rank	Name	Club	Goals
1	(Israel) Shay Aharon	Hapoel Jerusalem	13
2	(Israel) Adir Mauda	Hapoel Jerusalem	12
2	(Israel) Ya'akov Avdiav	Hapoel Ashkelon	12
4	(Israel) Elad Tshachko	Maccabi Ironi Kiryat Ata	11
5	(Israel) Yitzhak Levy	Maccabi HaShikma Ramat Hen	10
5	(Israel) Ill Rashid	Hapoel Bnei Jadeidi	10
5	(Israel) Nissim Asayag	Hapoel Ashkelon	10

== See also ==
- List of Israeli football transfers 2007–08
- 2007–08 Toto Cup Artzit
