= Shay Aharon =

Israeli footballer

Shay Aharon שי אהרון
Personal information
- Full name: Shay Aharon
- Date of birth: October 12, 1978 (age 48)
- Place of birth: Jerusalem, Israel
- Position: Striker

Team information
- Current team: Hapoel Jerusalem

Youth career
- 1990–1994: Hapoel Jerusalem

Senior career*
Years	Team	Apps	(Gls)
1994–2010	Hapoel Jerusalem	219	(114)
1996–1997	→ Maccabi Petah Tikva (loan)	22	(0)
2000	→ Hakoah Ramat Gan (loan)		
2005–2006	→ Hapoel Ashkelon (loan)		
2010–2015	Hapoel Katamon Jerusalem	72	(55)

International career
1998	Israel U21	4	(2)

Managerial career
- 2010: Hapoel Jerusalem (player-manager)
- 2014–2020: Hapoel Katamon Jerusalem (general manager)
- 2020–: Hapoel Jerusalem (general manager)
- * Club domestic league appearances and goals

Shay Aharon (Hebrew: שי אהרון; born 12 October 1978) is a retired Israeli footballer who is most known for playing with Hapoel Jerusalem and Hapoel Katamon Jerusalem. Aharon is the professional manager of Hapoel Jerusalem.

== Career ==
At the age of 19, Aharon made his debut for the senior side of Hapoel Jerusalem. From there on he became one of the most important players for the club as he was the main goalscorer for Hapoel. He is regarded as an icon in Hapoel Jerusalem.

On 3 May 2010 he was appointed as the manager of Hapoel while still an active player in the club. Later that month he decided to leave the club after he had enough of the way the club was operating.

On June 21, 2010, Aharon joined the fan-owned football club Hapoel Katamon Jerusalem. He played there for five seasons and scored 56 goals.

On June 26, 2014, Aharon retired from the game and became the general manager of Katamon. On May 1, 2015, Aharon came back to play his last game in which he scored a goal and celebrated the club's second promotion to the Liga Leumit.

== Honours ==
- Liga Artzit (2):
  - 2001-02, 2007-08
- Liga Artzit - 2007-08 Top Goalscorer (13 goals)
- Liga Bet (1):
  - 2010-11
- Liga Alef (1):
  - 2012-13
