= Adam Mizrahi =

Israeli footballer

Adam Mizrahi אדם מזרחי
Personal information
- Full name: Adam Mizrahi
- Date of birth: April 19, 1985 (age 41)
- Place of birth: Jerusalem, Israel
- Position: Striker

Senior career*
Years	Team	Apps	(Gls)
2005–2013	Hapoel Jerusalem	95	(25)
2008	→ Beitar Shimshon Tel Aviv (loan)	7	(0)
2008–2009	→ Maccabi Yavne (loan)	11	(2)
2009	→ Beitar Giv'at Ze'ev (loan)	9	(3)
2012	→ Hapoel Kfar Saba (loan)	10	(1)
2013–2014	Beitar Giv'at Ze'ev	24	(13)
2014–2016	Hapoel Katamon Jerusalem	26	(10)
2016	→ Hapoel Shefa-'Amr (loan)	6	(1)
2016–2017	Nordia Jerusalem	24	(11)
2017–2018	Ironi Modi'in	20	(13)
- * Club domestic league appearances and goals

Adam Mizrahi (Hebrew: אדם מזרחי; born April 19, 1985) is an Israeli footballer currently playing for Nordia Jerusalem.

== Honours ==
- Israeli Third Division (2):
  - 2010-11, 2014–15
