= Maccabi Ironi Kiryat Ata F.C. =

Israeli football club

Maccabi Ironi Kiryat Ata
- Full name: Maccabi Ironi Kiryat Ata
- Founded: 1969 as Maccabi Acre; 2000 as Maccabi Ironi Kiryat Ata
- Dissolved: 2020
- Ground: Kiryat Ata Municipal Stadium, Kiryat Ata
- Capacity: 726
- Chairman: Yeheskiel Tannenbaum
- Manager: Ilan Goldman
- League: Liga Alef North
- 2019–20: Liga Alef North, 15th (folded)
Home colours	Away colours

Maccabi Ironi Kiryat Ata (Hebrew: מכבי עירוני קריית אתא) is an Israeli football club, located in Kiryat Ata. They play in Liga Alef and play at the Kiryat Ata Municipal Stadium.

== History ==
The club was originally based in Acre and named Maccabi Acre. In the 1989–90 season they won the North Division of Liga Alef (then the third division) to win promotion to Liga Artzit. At the end of the 1993–94 season they were relegated back to Liga Alef after finishing second bottom. However, they made an immediate return to the second level. In 1999–2000 they finished third.

In 2000 the club's owner Barukh Ofir decided to move the club to Kiryat Ata (whose previous club, Hapoel Kiryat Ata, had folded) and rename it Maccabi Ironi Kiryat Ata. In the club's first season in its new guise, they were relegated to Liga Artzit (now the third tier). In 2004–05 they finished second from bottom, and were due to be relegated to Liga Alef. However, Maccabi Ramat Amidar left the league and the club were reprieved. The following season they finished third, a place below the promotion places, but in 2006–07 came third from bottom, one place above the relegation zone.

In 2007–08 they finished as runners-up to Hapoel Jerusalem and were promoted back to Liga Leumit. During the same season they also won the Liga Artzit's Toto Cup.

In 2008–09, the club finished bottom and was relegated to Liga Alef, the third tier.

On 27 July 2020 merged with Maccabi Tzur Shalom to Maccabi Kiryat Ata-Bialik.

== Honours ==
- Liga Alef
  - North Division champions 1989–90, 1994–95
- Toto Cup
  - Liga Artzit winners 2007–08
