= Hapoel Bnei Lod F.C. =

Israeli football club

Hapoel Bnei Lod
- Full name: Hapoel Bnei Lod Rakevet Football Club
- Founded: 1969; 1997 (Merger)
- Ground: Lod Municipal Stadium, Lod
- Capacity: 3,000
- Manager: Avivi Zohar
- 2023–24: Liga Alef South, 16th (folded)
Home colours	Away colours

Hapoel Bnei Lod Rakevet F.C. (Hebrew: הפועל בני לוד) is a football club from the central Israeli city of Lod. The club plays in an all-red kit in , the third tier of Israeli football. Home matches are played at the Lod Municipal Stadium.

== History ==
The club was founded in 1969 and joined Liga Dalet, then the fifth and lowest tier of Israeli football league system. In 1997, Hapoel Bnei Lod merged with Hapoel Rakevet Lod (both clubs played in Liga Gimel Central division) and formed Hapoel Bnei Lod Rakevet, under the management of Abu Subhi.

After the merger, the club won Liga Gimel Central division and reached Liga Bet for the first time in the 1998–99 season. In 2003–04 they won Liga Bet South B division. The following season the club won Liga Alef South division and promotion to Liga Artzit (the third tier). The winning run continued in 2005–06 as the club claimed the Liga Artzit championship to win promotion to Liga Leumit.

The club was close to achieve promotion to the Israeli Premier League at the end of the 2011–12 season, when they finished level in points with the first placed, Hapoel Ramat Gan. the two clubs faced in a decisive promotion play-off held in HaMoshava Stadium in Petah Tikva. Bnei Lod lost 0–2 and remained in Liga Leumit.

In the 2013–14 and 2014–15 seasons, the club finished third, one place short from promotion to the Israeli Premier League.

On 9 December 2014, the club won their first ever piece of silverware, winning the 2014–15 second division's Toto Cup after beating Bnei Yehuda 2–0.

== Current squad ==
As to 12 September 2021

No.	Pos.	Nation	Player
1	GK	ISR	Lidor Cohen
2	DF	ISR	Daniel Cohen
3	DF	ISR	Sagiv Cohen
4	DF	ISR	Sagi Kabilio
5	DF	ISR	Omer Rismani
6	DF	ISR	Bantayo Damane
8	MF	ISR	Sliman Al Kadiem
9	MF	ISR	Mervi Bergebedze
10	MF	ISR	Mohammed Alajo
11	MF	ISR	Yanai David

No.	Pos.	Nation	Player
13	GK	ISR	Omer Ouliel
14	MF	ISR	Yonatan Cohen
15	MF	ISR	Ron Yosef
17	DF	ISR	Almog Asraf
18	MF	ISR	Sergey Kurik
19	MF	ISR	Omer Shirazi
20	DF	ISR	Ido Ben Yosef
21	DF	ISR	Eve Bukris
29	MF	ISR	Gil Pahima
55	DF	ISR	Tal Gromes

== Past players ==
David O'Neill

- David Abidor

== Honours ==
=== League ===
Honour	No.	Years
Third tier	1	2005–06
Fourth tier	1	2004–05
Fifth tier	2	1997–98, 2003–04

=== Cup competitions ===
Honour	No.	Years
Toto Cup (second tier)	1	2014–15

== Notable managers ==
- Gili Landau (born 1958)
